= List of South Korean records in swimming =

The South Korean records in swimming are the fastest ever performances of swimmers from South Korea, which are recognised and ratified by the Korea Swimming Federation.

All records were set in finals unless noted otherwise.

== Long Course (50 m) ==
=== Men ===
Event	Time		Name	Club	Date	Meet	Location	Ref
50 m freestyle	21.66	sf, so, =	Ji Yu-chan	South Korea	1 August 2025	World Championships	Singapore, Singapore	
50 m freestyle	21.66	=, #	Kim Young-beom	South Korea	24 September 2026	Asian Games	Tokyo, Japan	
100 m freestyle	47.39	h	Kim Young-beom	Gangwon	22 October 2025	Korean National Sports Festival	Busan, South Korea	
200 m freestyle	1:43.92	AS	Hwang Sun-woo	Gangwon	20 October 2025	Korean National Sports Festival	Busan, South Korea	
400 m freestyle	3:41.53		Park Tae-hwan	South Korea	16 November 2010	Asian Games	Guangzhou, China	
800 m freestyle	7:43.86		Kim Jun-woo	South Korea	24 September 2026	Asian Games	Tokyo, Japan	
1500 m freestyle	14:47.38		Park Tae-hwan	South Korea	12 February 2012	NSW State Open Championships	Sydney, Australia	
50 m backstroke	24.48	=	Yoon Ji-hwan	Gangwon	27 March 2025	South Korean Championships	Gimcheon, South Korea	
50 m backstroke	24.48	=	Yoon Ji-hwan	Gangwon	21 October 2025	Korean National Sports Festival	Busan, South Korea	
100 m backstroke	53.32		Lee Ju-ho	-	27 March 2022	South Korean Championships	Gimcheon, South Korea	
200 m backstroke	1:55.34		Lee Ju-ho	South Korea	16 December 2025	Queensland Championships	Brisbane, Australia	
50 m breaststroke	26.75		Choi Dong-yeol	Gangwon	22 October 2025	Korean National Sports Festival	Busan, South Korea	
100 m breaststroke	59.28		Choi Dong-yeol	South Korea	25 September 2023	Asian Games	Hangzhou, China	
200 m breaststroke	2:08.59		Cho Sung-jae	-	17 November 2020	South Korean Championships	Gimcheon, South Korea	
50 m butterfly	23.15		Baek In-chul	-	14 October 2023	Korean National Sports Festival	Mokpo, South Korea	
100 m butterfly	51.29		Yang Jae-hoon	Gangwon	22 October 2025	Korean National Sports Festival	Busan, South Korea	
200 m butterfly	1:54.95		Kim Min-seop	—	23 March 2024	Korean Olympic Trials	Gimcheon, South Korea	
200m individual medley	1:57.66		Hwang Sun-woo	Gangwon	21 October 2025	Korean National Sports Festival	Busan, South Korea	
400m individual medley	4:15.27		Kim Min-kyu	South Korea	8 December 2009	East Asian Games	Kowloon, Hong Kong	
4×50m freestyle relay	1:31.99		Yang Jae-hoon (22.61); Jeon Ji-hoon (22.76); Jeon Ki-young (23.45); Song Im-gyu (23.17)	South Korea	16 February 2020	Konami Open	Tokyo, Japan	
4×100m freestyle relay	3:11.52		Hwang Sun-woo (47.62); Kim Woo-min (48.78); Yang Jae-hoon (48.24); Kim Young-beom (46.88)	Gangwon	21 October 2025	Korean National Sports Festival	Busan, South Korea	
4×200m freestyle relay	7:01.73		Yang Jae-hoon (1:46.83); Lee Ho-joon (1:45.36); Kim Woo-min (1:44.50); Hwang Sun-woo (1:45.04)	South Korea	25 September 2023	Asian Games	Hangzhou, China	
4×50m medley relay	1:39.63		Song Im-gyu (25.90); Choi Dong-yeol (28.05); Jeon Ji-hoon (23.55); Yang Jae-hoon (22.13)	South Korea	15 February 2020	Konami Open	Tokyo, Japan	
4×100m medley relay	3:31.97		Lee Ju-ho (53.92); Choi Dong-yeol (58.98); Yang Jae-hoon (51.58); Kim Young-beom (47.49)	South Korea	22 September 2026	Asian Games	Tokyo, Japan	

Legend: # – Record awaiting ratification by Korea Swimming Federation; WR – World record; AS – Asian record; e – equalled existing record;
Records not set in finals: h – heat; sf – semifinal; r – relay 1st leg; rh – relay heat 1st leg; b – B final; † – en route to final mark; so – swim-off; tt – time trial

=== Women ===
Event	Time		Name	Club	Date	Meet	Location	Ref
50 m freestyle	24.97		Hur Yeon-kyung	Daejeon	15 October 2023	Korean National Sports Festival	Mokpo, South Korea	
100 m freestyle	54.49		Hur Yeon-kyung	-	25 November 2023	Korean National Trials	Gimcheon, South Korea	
200 m freestyle	1:58.00		Jo Hyun-ju	-	27 March 2026	South Korean Championships	Gimcheon, South Korea	
400 m freestyle	4:09.23		Han Da-kyung	Jeonbuk	20 October 2026	Korean National Sports Festival	Jeju, South Korea	
800 m freestyle	8:35.62		Han Da-kyung	-	25 March 2026	South Korean Championships	Gimcheon, South Korea	
1500 m freestyle	16:26.67		Han Da-kyung	-	13 May 2021	Korean Olympic Trials	Jeju, South Korea	
50m backstroke	27.71		Kim Seung-won	Guseong Middle School	27 March 2025	South Korean Championships	Gimcheon, South Korea	
100m backstroke	59.56	r	Lee Eun-ji	-	15 June 2025	Gwangju Championships	Gwangju, South Korea	
200m backstroke	2:08.29		Lee Eun-ji	South Korea	18 July 2025	World University Games	Berlin, Germany	
50m breaststroke	31.07		Kim Dal-Eun	—	25 October 2009	Korean National Sports Festival	Daejeon, South Korea	
100m breaststroke	1:07.44		Kim Hye-jin	-	27 April 2018	South Korean Championships	Gwangju, South Korea	
200m breaststroke	2:22.69		Park Si-eun	South Korea	24 September 2026	Asian Games	Tokyo, Japan	
50m butterfly	26.26	=	Jeong So-eun	South Korea	2 November 2019	World Cup	Kazan, Russia	
50m butterfly	26.26	=	Jeong So-eun	-	21 July 2021	President of National Championships	Ulsan, South Korea	
100m butterfly	57.07		An Se-hyeon	South Korea	24 July 2017	World Championships	Budapest, Hungary	
200m butterfly	2:06.67		An Se-hyeon	South Korea	27 July 2017	World Championships	Budapest, Hungary	
200m individual medley	2:08.34		Kim Seo-yeong	South Korea	24 August 2018	Asian Games	Jakarta, Indonesia	
400m individual medley	4:35.93		Kim Seo-yeong	-	12 May 2017	Korean World Trials	Gimcheon, South Korea	
4×50m freestyle relay	1:45.39		Kim Seo-yeong (26.22); Jung You-in (25.43); Choi Ji-won (26.58); Han Chan-mi (27.16)	South Korea	14 December 2019	Queensland Championships	Brisbane, Australia	
4×100m freestyle relay	3:40.26		Lee Song-eun (54.81); Jo Hyun-ju (54.85); Hur Yeon-kyung (54.31); Kim Yun-hui (56.29)	South Korea	20 September 2026	Asian Games	Tokyo, Japan	
4×200m freestyle relay	8:00.11		Kim Seo-yeong (1:59.43); Hur Yeon-kyung (1:58.64); Park Su-jin (2:01.32); Han Da-kyung (2:00.72)	South Korea	28 September 2023	Asian Games	Hangzhou, China	
4×50m medley relay	1:56.43		Han Chan-mi (30.25); Kim Seo-yeong (32.40); Jung You-in (27.32); Choi Ji-won (26.46)	South Korea	14 December 2019	Queensland Championships	Brisbane, Australia	
4×100m medley relay	4:00.13		Lee Eun-ji (1:00.68); Ko Ha-ru (1:08.42); Kim Seo-yeong (57.41); Hur Yeon-kyung (53.62)	South Korea	29 September 2023	Asian Games	Hangzhou, China	

Legend: # – Record awaiting ratification by Korea Swimming Federation; WR – World record; AS – Asian record; e – equalled existing record;
Records not set in finals: h – heat; sf – semifinal; r – relay 1st leg; rh – relay heat 1st leg; b – B final; † – en route to final mark; so – swim-off; tt – time trial

=== Mixed relay ===
Event	Time		Name	Club	Date	Meet	Location	Ref
4×100 m freestyle relay	3:27.99	h	Ji Yu-chan (49.11); Yang Jae-hoon (49.17); Hur Yeon-kyung (54.43); Jeong So-eun (55.28)	South Korea	29 July 2023	World Championships	Fukuoka, Japan	
4×100 m medley relay	3:44.12		Kim Seung-won (1:00.15); Choi Dong-yeol (59.04); An Se-hyeon (57.66); Kim Young-beom (47.27)	South Korea	23 September 2026	Asian Games	Tokyo, Japan	

Legend: # – Record awaiting ratification by Korea Swimming Federation; WR – World record; AS – Asian record; e – equalled existing record;
Records not set in finals: h – heat; so – swim-off

== Short Course (25 m) ==
=== Men ===
Event	Time		Name	Club	Date	Meet	Location	Ref
50m freestyle	20.80	=, AS	Ji Yu-chan	South Korea	24 October 2024	World Cup	Incheon, South Korea	
50m freestyle	20.80	=, sf, AS	Ji Yu-chan	South Korea	14 December 2024	World Championships	Budapest, Hungary	
100m freestyle	46.34		Hwang Sun-woo	South Korea	21 December 2021	World Championships	Abu Dhabi, United Arab Emirates	
200m freestyle	1:39.72	AS	Hwang Sun-woo	South Korea	18 December 2022	World Championships	Melbourne, Australia	
400m freestyle	3:34.59	AS	Park Tae-hwan	South Korea	6 December 2016	World Championships	Windsor, Canada	
800m freestyle	7:37.01	†, AS	Park Tae-hwan	South Korea	11 December 2016	World Championships	Windsor, Canada	
1500m freestyle	14:15.51	AS	Park Tae-hwan	South Korea	11 December 2016	World Championships	Windsor, Canada	
50m backstroke	23.22		Jeong Dong-won	South Korea	23 September 2017	Asian Indoor and Martial Arts Games	Ashgabat, Turkmenistan	
100m backstroke	50.96	h	Song Im-gyu	South Korea	26 October 2024	World Cup	Incheon, South Korea	
200m backstroke	1:51.24		Lee Ju-ho	South Korea	1 October 2025	Australian Championships	Melbourne, Australia	
50m breaststroke	26.05		Choi Dong-yeol	South Korea	25 October 2024	World Cup	Incheon, South Korea	
100m breaststroke	56.74		Choi Dong-yeol	South Korea	24 October 2024	World Cup	Incheon, South Korea	
200m breaststroke	2:04.78	h	Cho Sung-jae	South Korea	13 December 2024	World Championships	Budapest, Hungary	
50m butterfly	22.60	=	Ji Yu-chan	South Korea	26 October 2024	World Cup	Incheon, South Korea	
50m butterfly	22.60	b, =, #	Yoon Jae-oh	South Korea	29 September 2026	Australian Championships	Melbourne, Australia	
100m butterfly	50.34	h	Kim Young-beom	South Korea	24 October 2024	World Cup	Incheon, South Korea	
200m butterfly	1:53.75		Moon Seung-woo	South Korea	25 October 2024	World Cup	Incheon, South Korea	
100m individual medley	52.00		Kim Ji-hun	South Korea	24 October 2024	World Cup	Incheon, South Korea	
200m individual medley	1:55.96		Kim Min-suk	South Korea	1 November 2024	World Cup	Singapore, Singapore	
400m individual medley	4:14.02		Han Kyu-chul	South Korea	24 November 2003	World Cup	Daejon, South Korea	
4×50m freestyle relay	1:28.56	h	Hwang Sun-woo (21.72); Kim Woo-min (22.21); Won Young-jun (22.20); Lee Ho-joon (22.43)	South Korea	19 December 2021	World Championships	Abu Dhabi, United Arab Emirates	
4×100m freestyle relay	3:16.48	h	Won Young-jun (48.87); Moon Seung-woo (49.77); Kim Woo-min (48.78); Lee Ho-joon (49.06)	South Korea	16 December 2021	World Championships	Abu Dhabi, United Arab Emirates	
4×200m freestyle relay	6:49.67		Hwang Sun-woo (1:40.99); Kim Woo-min (1:42.03); Lee Ho-joon (1:42.92); Yang Jae-hoon (1:43.73)	South Korea	16 December 2022	World Championships	Melbourne, Australia	
4×50m medley relay	1:35.28		Jeong Dong-won (23.45); Moon Jae-kwon (26.42); Jeon Sung-min (23.04); Jang Dong-hyeok (22.37)	South Korea	22 September 2017	Asian Indoor and Martial Arts Games	Ashgabat, Turkmenistan	
4×100m medley relay	3:29.36	h	Lee Ju-ho (52.39); Choi Dong-yeol (57.51); Kim Ji-hun (51.30); Lee Ho-joon (48.16)	South Korea	15 December 2024	World Championships	Budapest, Hungary	

Legend: # – Record awaiting ratification by Korea Swimming Federation; WR – World record; AS – Asian record; e – equalled existing record;
Records not set in finals: h – heat; sf – semifinal; r – relay 1st leg; rh – relay heat 1st leg; b – B final; † – en route to final mark; so – swim-off; tt – time trial

=== Women ===
Event	Time		Name	Club	Date	Meet	Location	Ref
50m freestyle	24.37		Hur Yeon-kyung	South Korea	24 October 2024	World Cup	Incheon, South Korea	
100m freestyle	54.06		Jeong So-eun	South Korea	23 October 2021	World Cup	Doha, Qatar	
200m freestyle	1:56.38 (Note: by official result source; 1:57.94 by federation source, a typo)		Jo Hyun-ju	South Korea	25 October 2024	World Cup	Incheon, South Korea	
400m freestyle	4:05.90		Han Da-kyung	South Korea	21 October 2021	World Cup	Doha, Qatar	
800m freestyle	8:24.06		Han Da-kyung	South Korea	23 October 2021	World Cup	Doha, Qatar	
1500m freestyle	16:43.29		Kim Chae-yun	South Korea	25 October 2024	World Cup	Incheon, South Korea	
50m backstroke	26.67	rh, =	Kim San-ha	South Korea	17 December 2022	World Championships	Melbourne, Australia	
50m backstroke	26.67	=	Kim Seung-won	South Korea	24 October 2024	World Cup	Incheon, South Korea	
100m backstroke	58.01	rh	Kim San-ha	South Korea	18 December 2022	World Championships	Melbourne, Australia	
200m backstroke	2:08.51		Lee Yun-jung	South Korea	26 October 2024	World Cup	Incheon, South Korea	
50m breaststroke	30.35		Park Si-eun	South Korea	26 October 2024	World Cup	Incheon, South Korea	
100m breaststroke	1:05.36	h	Park Si-eun	South Korea	11 December 2024	World Championships	Budapest, Hungary	
200m breaststroke	2:19.58		Park Si-eun	South Korea	24 October 2024	World Cup	Incheon, South Korea	
50m butterfly	25.61		Jeong So-eun	South Korea	22 October 2021	World Cup	Doha, Qatar	
100m butterfly	56.87		Kim Seo-yeong	South Korea	26 October 2024	World Cup	Incheon, South Korea	
200m butterfly	2:03.65		Choi Hye-ra	South Korea	9 November 2011	World Cup	Beijing, China	
100m individual medley	59.39		Kim Seo-yeong	South Korea	24 October 2024	World Cup	Incheon, South Korea	
200m individual medley	2:06.12		Kim Seo-yeong	South Korea	18 November 2017	World Cup	Singapore, Singapore	
400m individual medley	4:28.11		Kim Seo-yeong	South Korea	19 November 2017	World Cup	Singapore, Singapore	
4×50m freestyle relay	1:42.83		Kim Go-eun (26.31); Park Jin-young; Kim Ji-heun; Hwang Seo-jin	South Korea	2 July 2013	Asian Indoor and Martial Arts Games	Incheon, South Korea	
4×100m freestyle relay	3:40.40	h	Jeong So-eun (54.19); Ryu Ji-won (55.67); Han Da-kyung (56.78); Kim Seo-yeong (53.76)	South Korea	16 December 2021	World Championships	Abu Dhabi, United Arab Emirates	
4×200m freestyle relay	8:11.15	h	Lee Keo-ra (2:00.16); Lee Ji-eun (2:02.33); Jung Ji-yeon (2:04.99); Shim Min-ji (2:03.67)	South Korea	5 April 2006	World Championships	Shanghai, China	
4×50m medley relay	1:48.24	h	Kim San-ha (26.67); Moon Su-a (31.18); Kim Seo-yeong (25.83); Hur Yeon-kyung (24.56)	South Korea	17 December 2022	World Championships	Melbourne, Australia	
4×100m medley relay	3:56.66	h	Kim San-ha (58.01); Moon Su-a (1:06.87); Kim Seo-yeong (57.79); Hur Yeon-kyung (53.99)	South Korea	18 December 2022	World Championships	Melbourne, Australia	

Legend: # – Record awaiting ratification by Korea Swimming Federation; WR – World record; AS – Asian record; e – equalled existing record;
Records not set in finals: h – heat; sf – semifinal; r – relay 1st leg; rh – relay heat 1st leg; b – B final; † – en route to final mark; so – swim-off; tt – time trial

=== Mixed relay ===
Event	Time		Name	Club	Date	Meet	Location	Ref
4×50m freestyle relay	1:32.17	h	Kim ji-hun (21.66); Ji Yu-chan (20.90); Jeong So-eun (25.09); Hur Yeon-kyung (24.52)	South Korea	13 December 2024	World Championships	Budapest, Hungary	
4×50m medley relay	1:40.12	h	Kim Seung-won (27.40); Choi Dong-yeol (26.03); Jeong So-eun (26.31); Ji Yu-chan (20.38)	South Korea	11 December 2024	World Championships	Budapest, Hungary	

Legend: # – Record awaiting ratification by Korean Swimming Federation; WR – World record; ER – European record; e – equalled existing record;
Records not set in finals: h – heat; sf – semifinal; r – relay 1st leg; rh – relay heat 1st leg; b – B final; † – en route to final mark; so – swim-off; tt – time trial
