= Swimming at the 2026 Asian Games – Women's 100 metre butterfly =

Women's 100 metre butterfly at the 2026 Asian Games
- Venue: Tokyo Aquatics Centre
- Date: 20 September 2026
- Competitors: 20 from 14 nations

Medalists
gold medal	Yu Yiting	China
silver medal	Zhang Yufei	China
bronze medal	Natalie Kan	Hong Kong

The women's 100 metre butterfly event at the 2026 Asian Games took place on 20 September 2026 at the Tokyo Aquatics Centre.

== Schedule ==
All times are Japan Standard Time (UTC+09:00)

Date	Time	Event
Wednesday, 23 September 2026	10:00	Heats
Wednesday, 23 September 2026	17:00	Final

== Records ==
Prior to this competition, the existing world, Asian and Games records were as follows.

World Record	Gretchen Walsh (USA)	54.33	Fort Lauderdale, United States	2 May 2026
Asian Record	Zhang Yufei (CHN)	55.62	Qingdao, China	29 September 2020
Games Record	Zhang Yufei (CHN)	55.86	Hangzhou, China	27 September 2023

== Results ==
=== Heats ===
Rank	Heat	Athlete	Time	Notes
1	3	Zhang Yufei (CHN)	57.31	Q
2	1	Natalie Kan (HKG)	58.34	Q
3	2	Yu Yiting (CHN)	58.38	Q
4	1	Rikako Ikee (JPN)	58.82	Q
5	2	Nagisa Ikemoto (JPN)	59.02	Q
6	1	An Se-hyeon (KOR)	59.22	Q
7	3	Han An-chi (TPE)	59.51	Q
8	2	Liu Pei-yin (TPE)	59.65	Q
9	1	Lee Song-eun (KOR)	1:00.49	Q
10	3	Yeung Hoi Ching (HKG)	1:00.73	Q
11	3	Napatsawan Jaritkla (THA)	1:00.76	Reserve
12	1	Teia Salvino (PHI)	1:00.79	Reserve
13	2	Sofia Spodarenko (KAZ)	1:01.05	
14	3	Megan Yo (SGP)	1:01.68	
15	2	Varissara Nopthong (THA)	1:02.08	
16	3	Nadia Aisha Nurazmi (INA)	1:02.61	
17	2	Asma Lefalher (BRN)	1:06.62	
18	1	Khandarmaa Batsukh (MGL)	1:12.65	
19	1	Maya Khalil (PLE)	1:13.13	
20	3	Mona Alfarsi (KUW)	3:41.97	

=== Final ===
Rank	Athlete	Time	Notes
1st place, gold medalist(s)	Yu Yiting (CHN)	56.41	GR
2nd place, silver medalist(s)	Zhang Yufei (CHN)	56.44	
3rd place, bronze medalist(s)	Natalie Kan (HKG)	58.05	
4	An Se-hyeon (KOR)	58.09	
5	Rikako Ikee (JPN)	58.25	
6	Nagisa Ikemoto (JPN)	58.62	
7	Han An-chi (TPE)	58.92	
8	Liu Pei-yin (TPE)	1:00.04	
9	Yeung Hoi Ching (HKG)	1:00.55	
10	Napatsawan Jaritkla (THA)	1:01.25	
