= List of Macanese records in swimming =

The Macau records in swimming are the fastest ever performances of swimmers from Macao, which are recognised and ratified by the Associação de Natação de Macau.

All records were set in finals unless noted otherwise.

== Long Course (50 m) ==
=== Men ===
Event	Time		Name	Club	Date	Meet	Location	Ref
50 m freestyle	22.54	sf	Ng Chi Hin	Macau	15 November 2025	National Games	Shenzhen, China	
100 m freestyle	51.32		Ng Chi Hin	-	24 May 2026	Macau Age Group Championships	Macau, Macau	
200 m freestyle	1:55.12	h	Lin Sizhuang	Macau	24 July 2017	World Championships	Budapest, Hungary	
400 m freestyle	4:08.73	h	Lin Sizhuang	Macau	23 July 2017	World Championships	Budapest, Hungary	
800 m freestyle	8:43.13		Lin Sizhuang	Macau	26 November 2015	Pacific School Games	Adelaide, Australia	
1500 m freestyle	16:44.29		Lam Pak Hei	-	7 September 2025	Macanese Championships	Macau, Macau	
50m backstroke	26.53	h	Ngou Pok Man	Macau	20 August 2018	Asian Games	Jakarta, Indonesia	
100m backstroke	57.08	h	Ngou Pok Man	Macau	21 September 2014	Asian Games	Incheon, South Korea	
200m backstroke	2:08.30		Ngou Pok Man	-	8 May 2011	Macau Age Group Championships	Macau	
50m breaststroke	27.76		Chao Man Hou	Macau	29 September 2023	Asian Games	Hangzhou, China	
100m breaststroke	1:01.31	h	Chao Man Hou	Macau	25 September 2023	Asian Games	Hangzhou, China	
200m breaststroke	2:15.09	h	Chao Man Hou	Macau	6 July 2019	Universiade	Naples, Italy	
50m butterfly	23.63	h	Ng Chi Hin	Macau	24 September 2026	Asian Games	Tokyo, Japan	
100m butterfly	55.10		Wong Wing Cheun	Macau	5 November 2005	East Asian Games	Macau	
200m butterfly	2:10.44	h	Wong Wing Cheun	Macau	26 July 2005	World Championships	Montreal, Canada	
200m individual medley	2:08.25		Chao Man Hou	-	12 September 2020	Macau Age Group Championships	Macau	
400m individual medley	4:44.09		Lin Sizhuang	-	16 April 2016	Macanese Championships	Macau	
4×100m freestyle relay	3:29.97	h	Chao Man Hou (51.60); Ngou Pok Man (51.52); Lin Sizhuang (52.69); Chou Kit (54.16)	Macau	22 August 2018	Asian Games	Jakarta, Indonesia	
4×200m freestyle relay	7:51.00	h	Lin Sizhuang (1:55.29); Ngou Pok Man (1:58.20); Chao Man Hou (1:56.10); Chou Kit (2:01.41)	Macau	20 August 2018	Asian Games	Jakarta, Indonesia	
4×100m medley relay	3:47.89	h	Chan Hou Wa (59.12); Chao Man Hou (1:01.96); Lam Chi Chong (56.47); Ng Chi Hin (50.34)	Macau	22 September 2026	Asian Games	Tokyo, Japan	

Legend: # – Record awaiting ratification by Associação de Natação de Macau; WR – World record; AS – Asian record; e – equalled existing record;
Records not set in finals: h – heat; sf – semifinal; r – relay 1st leg; rh – relay heat 1st leg; b – B final; † – en route to final mark; so – swim-off; tt – time trial

=== Women ===
Event	Time		Name	Club	Date	Meet	Location	Ref
50m freestyle	26.33	h	Lei On Kei	Macau	3 August 2013	World Championships	Barcelona, Spain	
100m freestyle	58.25	r	Ma Cheok Mei	Macau	9 December 2009	East Asian Games	Kowloon, Hong Kong	
200m freestyle	2:08.45		Tan Chi Yan	Macau	9 May 2014	Malaysia Open Championships	Kuala Lumpur, Malaysia	
400m freestyle	4:35.81	h	Che Lok In	Macau	2 February 2008	China Open	Beijing, China	
800m freestyle	9:23.01		Che Lok In	Macau	1 February 2008	China Open	Beijing, China	
1500m freestyle	18:15.11		Che Lok In	Macau	28 August 2007	Asian Age Group Championships	Jakarta, Indonesia	
50m backstroke	29.87	h	Erica Vong	Macau	21 August 2018	Asian Games	Jakarta, Indonesia	
100m backstroke	1:04.48		Wong Un lao	-	7 February 2026	Macau School Championships	Macau, Macau	
200m backstroke	2:20.19	h	Wong Un lao	Macau	22 September 2026	Asian Games	Tokyo, Japan	
50m breaststroke	31.56	h	Chen Pui Lam	Macau	17 February 2024	World Championships	Doha, Qatar	
100m breaststroke	1:09.99	h	Chen Pui Lam	Macau	23 September 2026	Asian Games	Tokyo, Japan	
200m breaststroke	2:31.57	h	Chen Pui Lam	Macau	23 September 2026	Asian Games	Tokyo, Japan	
50m butterfly	28.44	h	Ma Cheok Mei	Macau	7 December 2009	East Asian Games	Kowloon, Hong Kong	
100m butterfly	1:03.19		Ma Cheok Mei	Macau	10 August 2009	Asian Age Group Championships	Tokyo, Japan	
200m butterfly	2:21.83		Chan Yih Shiuan	-	18 September 2005	Macanese Championships	Macau, Macau	
200m individual medley	2:23.04		Chen Pui Lam	Green Wave	26 May 2024	Macanese Age Group Championships	Macau, Macau	
400m individual medley	5:08.23	h	Cheang Weng Chi	Macau	18 July 2025	World University Games	Berlin, Germany	
4×100m freestyle relay	3:54.27		Wong Un lao (58.42); Chan Mei Yan (57.95); Cheang Weng Chi (58.95); Chen Pui Lam (58.95)	Macau	20 September 2026	Asian Games	Tokyo, Japan	
4×200m freestyle relay	8:42.39		Cheang Weng Chi (2:10.68); Chan Mei Yan (2:07.81); Kuok Hei Cheng (2:12.49); Wong Un lao (2:11.41)	Macau	24 September 2026	Asian Games	Tokyo, Japan	
4×50m medley relay	2:01.95	h	Wong Un Iao; Cheang Weng Chi; Chen Pui Lam; Chan Mei Yan	Macau	13 December 2025	61th Hong Kong-Macau Interport Competition	Hong Kong, Hong Kong	
4×100m medley relay	4:18.73		Wong Un lao (1:04.73); Chen Pui Lam (1:09.74); Cheang Weng Chi (1:05.39); Chan Mei Yan (58.87)	Macau	20 September 2026	Asian Games	Tokyo, Japan	

Legend: # – Record awaiting ratification by Associação de Natação de Macau; WR – World record; AS – Asian record; e – equalled existing record;
Records not set in finals: h – heat; sf – semifinal; r – relay 1st leg; rh – relay heat 1st leg; b – B final; † – en route to final mark; so – swim-off; tt – time trial

=== Mixed relay ===
Event	Time		Name	Club	Date	Meet	Location	Ref
4×100 m freestyle relay	3:43.49	h	Chao Man Hou (52.33); Lin Sizhuang (52.45); Tan Chi Yan (59.37); Lei On Kei (59.34)	Macao	29 July 2017	World Championships	Budapest, Hungary	
4×100 m medley relay	4:05.24	h	Wong Un lao (1:05.97); Chao Man Hou (1:02.48); Lam Chi Chong (57.73); Chen Pui Lam (59.06)	Macao	13 November 2025	National Games	Shenzhen, China	

Legend: # – Record awaiting ratification by Associação de Natação de Macau; WR – World record; AS – Asian record; e – equalled existing record;
Records not set in finals: h – heat; so – swim-off

== Short Course (25 m) ==
=== Men ===
Event	Time		Name	Club	Date	Meet	Location	Ref
50m freestyle	22.04	h	Ng Chi Hin	Macau	16 October 2026	World Cup	Astana, Kazakhstan	
100m freestyle	49.38	h	Chao Man Hou	Macau	4 November 2022	World Cup	Indianapolis, United States	
200m freestyle	1:51.88	h	Lin Sizhuang	Macau	24 September 2017	Asian Indoor and Martial Arts Games	Ashgabat, Turkmenistan	
400m freestyle	3:58.31	h	Lin Sizhuang	Macau	18 November 2017	World Cup	Singapore, Singapore	
800m freestyle	8:21.81		Lin Sizhuang	Macau	17 December 2022	World Championships	Melbourne, Australia	
1500m freestyle	16:07.26		Lin Sizhuang	-	31 October 2015	Macanese Championships	Macau	
50m backstroke	25.70	rh	Ngou Pok Man	Macau	10 December 2016	World Championships	Windsor, Canada	
100m backstroke	54.32		Ngou Pok Man	Macau	29 September 2014	World Cup	Singapore, Singapore	
200m backstroke	2:06.18		Ngou Pok Man	-	24 October 2010	Macanese Championships	Macau	
50m breaststroke	26.46	h	Chao Man Hou	Macau	17 December 2022	World Championships	Melbourne, Australia	
100m breaststroke	58.01	h, =	Chao Man Hou	Macau	28 October 2022	World Cup	Toronto, Canada	
100m breaststroke	58.01	h, =	Chao Man Hou	Macau	14 December 2022	World Championships	Melbourne, Australia	
200m breaststroke	2:07.50	h	Chao Man Hou	Macau	5 November 2022	World Cup	Indianapolis, United States	
50m butterfly	23.31	h	Ng Chi Hin	Macau	17 October 2026	World Cup	Astana, Kazakhstan	
100m butterfly	52.78		Wong Wing Cheun	Macau	31 October 2007	Asian Indoor Games	Macau	
200m butterfly	2:05.47		Wong Wing Cheun	Macau	15 November 2005	Asian Indoor Games	Bangkok, Thailand	
100m individual medley	55.47		Chao Man Hou	-	16 March 2019	Macau Age Group Championships	Macau	
200m individual medley	2:02.41	h	Lin Sizhuang	Macau	13 December 2022	World Championships	Melbourne, Australia	
400m individual medley	4:28.91	h	Lin Sizhuang	Macau	10 December 2016	World Championships	Windsor, Canada	
4×50m freestyle relay	1:33.60	h	Chao Man Hou (23.20); Lao Kuan Fong (23.60); Sio Ka Kun (23.40); Lin Sizhuang (23.40)	Macau	24 September 2017	Asian Indoor and Martial Arts Games	Ashgabat, Turkmenistan	
4×100m freestyle relay	3:26.34		Chao Man Hou (49.82); Lao Kuan Fong (51.74); Sio Ka Kun (54.12); Lin Sizhuang (50.66)	Macau	23 September 2017	Asian Indoor and Martial Arts Games	Ashgabat, Turkmenistan	
4×200m freestyle relay	7:46.05	h	Lin Sizhuang (1:52.78); Ngou Pok Man (1:56.12); Yum Cheng Man (2:00.32); Chao Man Hou (1:55.83)	Macao	9 December 2016	World Championships	Windsor, Canada	
4×50m medley relay	1:41.59	h	Ngou Pok Man (25.70); Chao Man Hou (27.06); Sio Ka Kun (24.99); Lin Sizhuang (23.84)	Macau	10 December 2016	World Championships	Windsor, Canada	
4×100m medley relay	3:43.03	h	Ngou Pok Man (55.82); Chao Man Hou (59.29); Sio Ka Kun (56.90); Lin Sizhuang (51.02)	Macau	11 December 2016	World Championships	Windsor, Canada	

Legend: # – Record awaiting ratification by Associação de Natação de Macau; WR – World record; AS – Asian record; e – equalled existing record;
Records not set in finals: h – heat; sf – semifinal; r – relay 1st leg; rh – relay heat 1st leg; b – B final; † – en route to final mark; so – swim-off; tt – time trial

=== Women ===
Event	Time		Name	Club	Date	Meet	Location	Ref
50m freestyle	25.70	r	Lei On Kei	Macau	24 September 2017	Asian Indoor and Martial Arts Games	Ashgabat, Turkmenistan	
100m freestyle	57.17	r	Lei On Kei	Macau	23 September 2017	Asian Indoor and Martial Arts Games	Ashgabat, Turkmenistan	
200m freestyle	2:06.15	r	Wong Un lao	-	23 November 2025	Macanese Championships	Macau, Macau	
400m freestyle	4:30.05		Cheang Weng Chi	Macau	8 October 2026	World Cup	Tashkent, Uzbekistan	
800m freestyle	9:10.21		Che Lok In	Macau	10 April 2008	World Championships	Manchester, Great Britain	
1500m freestyle	17:56.76		Che Lok In	-	2 December 2007	Macanese Championships	Macau	
50m backstroke	28.40	h	Erica Man Wai Vong	Macau	29 September 2014	World Cup	Singapore, Singapore	
100m backstroke	1:02.64		Wong Un lao	-	23 November 2025	Macanese Championships	Macau, Macau	
200m backstroke	2:15.10		Wong Un lao	-	22 November 2025	Macanese Championships	Macau, Macau	
50m breaststroke	31.22	h	Chen Pui Lam	Macao	20 October 2024	World Cup	Shanghai, China	
100m breaststroke	1:08.26	h	Chen Pui Lam	Macao	19 October 2024	World Cup	Shanghai, China	
200m breaststroke	2:32.70	h	Chen Pui Lam	Macao	18 October 2024	World Cup	Shanghai, China	
50m butterfly	27.88		Ma Cheok Mei	Macau	6 November 2009	Asian Indoor Games	Hanoi, Vietnam	
100m butterfly	1:00.81		Ma Cheok Mei	Macau	5 November 2009	Asian Indoor Games	Hanoi, Vietnam	
200m butterfly	2:21.63		Cheang Weng Chi	Macau	18 October 2024	World Cup	Incheon, South Korea	
100m individual medley	1:03.83		Lei On Kei	-	26 November 2017	Macanese Championships	Macau	
200m individual medley	2:19.70		Cheang Weng Chi	Macau	20 October 2024	World Cup	Incheon, South Korea	
400m individual medley	4:57.26		Cheang Weng Chi	-	24 November 2024	Macanese Championships	Macau	
4×50m freestyle relay	1:45.63		Lei On Kei (25.70); Tan Chi Yan (25.97); Choi Weng Tong (27.30); Long Chi Wai (26.66)	Macau	24 September 2017	Asian Indoor and Martial Arts Games	Ashgabat, Turkmenistan	
4×100m freestyle relay	3:53.65		Lei On Kei (57.17); Tan Chi Yan (58.21); Choi Weng Tong (59.58); Long Chi Wai (58.69)	Macau	23 September 2017	Asian Indoor and Martial Arts Games	Ashgabat, Turkmenistan	
4×200m freestyle relay	8:42.00	h	Tan Chi Yan (2:07.03); Lei On Kei (2:10.06); Choi Weng Tong (2:13.81); Long Chi Wai (2:11.10)	Macau	10 December 2016	World Championships	Windsor, Canada	
4×50m medley relay	1:59.28		Tan Chi Yan (30.95); Lei On Kei (32.26); Long Chi Wai (29.13); Choi Weng Tong (26.94)	Macau	22 September 2017	Asian Indoor and Martial Arts Games	Ashgabat, Turkmenistan	
4×100m medley relay	4:22.11		Fong Man Wai; Lei On Kei; Ma Cheok Mei; Tan Chi Yan	Macau	7 November 2009	Asian Indoor Games	Hanoi, Vietnam	

Legend: # – Record awaiting ratification by Associação de Natação de Macau; WR – World record; AS – Asian record; e – equalled existing record;
Records not set in finals: h – heat; sf – semifinal; r – relay 1st leg; rh – relay heat 1st leg; b – B final; † – en route to final mark; so – swim-off; tt – time trial

=== Mixed relay ===
Event	Time	Name	Club	Date	Meet	Location	Ref
4×50m freestyle relay	1:37.88	Ngou Pok Man (23.09); Chao Man Hou (22.92); Tan Chi Yan (26.32); Lei On Kei (25.55)	Macau	30 September 2014	World Cup	Hong Kong	
4×50m medley relay	1:47.65	Erica Vong (28.65); Lei On Kei (31.79); Chao Man Hou (24.62); Ngou Pok Man (22.59)	Macau	29 September 2014	World Cup	Hong Kong	

Legend: # – Record awaiting ratification by Associação de Natação de Macau; e – equalled existing record;
Records not set in finals: h – heat; so – swim-off
