= Swimming at the 2026 Asian Games – Women's 50 metre breaststroke =

Women's 50 metre breaststroke at the 2026 Asian Games
- Venue: Tokyo Aquatics Centre
- Date: 20 September 2026
- Competitors: 25 from 17 nations

Medalists
gold medal	Tang Qianting	China
silver medal	Satomi Suzuki	Japan
bronze medal	Yang Chang	China

The women's 50 metre breaststroke event at the 2026 Asian Games took place on 20 September 2026 at the Tokyo Aquatics Centre.

== Schedule ==
All times are Japan Standard Time (UTC+09:00)

Date	Time	Event
Sunday, 20 September 2026	10:55	Heats
Sunday, 20 September 2026	18:01	Final

== Records ==
Prior to this competition, the existing world, Asian and Games records were as follows.

World Record	Ruta Meilutyte (LTU)	29.16	Fukuoka, Japan	30 July 2023
Asian Record	Tang Qianting (CHN)	29.44	Shenzhen, China	19 March 2026
Games Record	Tang Qianting (CHN)	29.92	Hangzhou, China	24 September 2023

== Results ==
=== Heats ===
Rank	Heat	Athlete	Time	Notes
1	3	Tang Qianting (CHN)	29.50	Q GR
2	2	Satomi Suzuki (JPN)	30.35	Q
3	1	Yang Chang (CHN)	30.56	Q
4	3	Kotomi Kato (JPN)	31.06	Q
5	1	Park Si-eun (KOR)	31.62	Q
=5	2	Lin Pei-wun (TPE)	31.62	Q
7	2	Mikayla Liz Tan (SGP)	31.86	Q
8	2	Pui Lam Chen (MAC)	31.92	Q
9	3	Chiu Yi-chen (TPE)	32.19	Q
10	3	Thúy Nguyễn (VIE)	32.28	Q
11	3	Adellia (INA)	32.31	Reserve
12	1	Man Wui Kiu (HKG)	32.53	Reserve
13	2	Phurichaya Junyamitree (THA)	32.70	
14	1	Valerie Tarazi (PLE)	33.09	
15	1	Lynn El Hajj (LBN)	33.20	
16	1	Thitirat Inchai (THA)	33.22	
17	3	Jiaqi Tay (SGP)	33.88	
18	1	Marina Abushamaleh (PLE)	34.35	
19	2	Maral Batsanal (MGL)	34.89	
20	1	Nomin-erdene Batchuluun (MGL)	35.58	
21	2	Noor Taha (BRN)	35.87	
22	2	Hareem Malik (PAK)	36.52	
23	1	Mst Mukti Khatun (BAN)	36.61	
24	3	Mishael Aisha Hyat Ayub (PAK)	37.02	
	1	Tamsiri Niyomxay (LAO)	DNS	

=== Final ===
Rank	Athlete	Time	Notes
1st place, gold medalist(s)	Tang Qianting (CHN)	29.45	GR
2nd place, silver medalist(s)	Satomi Suzuki (JPN)	29.91	NR
3rd place, bronze medalist(s)	Yang Chang (CHN)	30.24	
4	Kotomi Kato (JPN)	30.75	
5	Park Si-eun (KOR)	31.45	
6	Lin Pei-wun (TPE)	31.62	
7	Mikayla Tan (SGP)	31.76	
8	Thúy Nguyễn (VIE)	31.96	
9	Pui Lam Chen (MAC)	32.11	
10	Chiu Yi-chen (TPE)	32.32	
