= Swimming at the 2026 Asian Games – Women's 50 metre butterfly =

Women's 50 metre butterfly at the 2026 Asian Games
- Venue: Tokyo Aquatics Centre
- Date: 25 September 2026
- Competitors: 28 from 20 nations

Medalists
gold medal	Zhang Yufei	China
silver medal	Wu Qingfeng	China
bronze medal	Rikako Ikee	Japan

The women's 50 metre butterfly event at the 2026 Asian Games took place on 25 September 2026 at the Tokyo Aquatics Centre.

== Schedule ==
All times are Japan Standard Time (UTC+09:00)

Date	Time	Event
Friday, 25 September 2026	10:00	Heats
Friday, 25 September 2026	17:00	Final

== Records ==
Prior to this competition, the existing world, Asian and Games records were as follows.

World Record	Sarah Sjöström (SWE)	24.43	Skara, Sweden	5 July 2014
Asian Record	Zhang Yufei (CHN)	25.05	Fukuoka, Japan	29 July 2023
Games Record	Zhang Yufei (CHN)	25.10	Hangzhou, China	29 September 2023

== Results ==
=== Heats ===
Rank	Heat	Athlete	Time	Notes
1	3	Zhang Yufei (CHN)	25.57	Q
2	3	Rikako Ikee (JPN)	25.98	Q
3	2	Wu Qingfeng (CHN)	26.00	Q
4	1	Natalie Kan Cheuk Tung (HKG)	26.28	Q
5	2	Sofia Spodarenko (KAZ)	26.42	Q
=6	1	Yeo Chiok Sze (SGP)	26.44	Q
=6	2	An Se-hyeon (KOR)	26.44	Q
8	1	Chiho Mizuguchi (JPN)	26.81	Q
=9	3	Lee Song-eun (KOR)	27.13	Q
=9	1	Han An-chi (TPE)	27.13	Q
11	2	Yeung Hoi Ching (HKG)	27.39	Reserve
12	3	Sofiya Abubakirova (KAZ)	27.40	Reserve
13	1	Chiu Yi-chen (TPE)	27.52	
14	3	Nguyễn Thủy (VIE)	27.60	
15	3	Heather White (PHI)	27.62	
16	2	Megan Yo (SGP)	27.66	
17	1	Nadia Aisha Nurazmi (INA)	28.13	
18	1	Asma Lefalher (BRN)	29.33	
19	3	Cheang Weng Chi (MAC)	29.43	
20	3	Enerel Gurdavaa (MGL)	29.48	
21	2	Kuok Hei Cheng (MAC)	29.78	
22	3	Maya Khalil (PLE)	30.18	
23	2	Haley Rose Sakbun (CAM)	30.31	
24	2	Ujin Orkhon (MGL)	30.81	
25	1	Mishael Aisha Hyat Ayub (PAK)	30.95	
26	3	Valeriya Mirenskaya (TKM)	31.09	
27	1	Mona Alfarsi (KUW)	33.85	
	2	Napatsawan Jaritkla (THA)	DNS	

=== Final ===
Rank	Athlete	Time	Notes
1st place, gold medalist(s)	Zhang Yufei (CHN)	25.41	
2nd place, silver medalist(s)	Wu Qingfeng (CHN)	25.62	
3rd place, bronze medalist(s)	Rikako Ikee (JPN)	25.97	
4	Natalie Kan Cheuk Tung (HKG)	26.11	
5	Yeo Chiok Sze (SGP)	26.36	
6	Sofia Spodarenko (KAZ)	26.49	
7	An Se-hyeon (KOR)	26.66	
8	Lee Song-eun (KOR)	27.10	
9	Chiho Mizuguchi (JPN)	27.12	
10	Yeung Hoi Ching (HKG)	27.55	
