= Swimming at the 2022 Asian Games – Women's 50 metre breaststroke =

Women's 50 metre breaststroke at the 2022 Asian Games
- Venue: Hangzhou Olympic Expo Aquatics Center
- Date: 24 September 2023
- Competitors: 25 from 16 nations

Medalists
gold medal	Tang Qianting	China
silver medal	Satomi Suzuki	Japan
bronze medal	Siobhán Haughey	Hong Kong

The Women's 50 metre breaststroke event at the 2022 Asian Games took place on 24 September 2023 at the Hangzhou Olympic Expo Center.

== Schedule ==
All times are China Standard Time (UTC+08:00)

Date	Time	Event
Sunday, 24 September 2023	11:08	Heats
Sunday, 24 September 2023	20:32	Final

== Records ==
Prior to this competition, the existing world, Asian and Games records were as follows.

World Record	Rūta Meilutytė (LTU)	29.16	Fukuoka, Japan	30 July 2023
Asian Record	Tang Qianting (CHN)	30.08	Fukuoka, Japan	29 July 2023
Games Record	Satomi Suzuki (JPN)	30.83	Jakarta, Indonesia	23 August 2018

== Results ==
=== Heats ===
Rank	Heat	Athlete	Time	Notes
1	2	Tang Qianting (CHN)	29.92	AR
2	4	Siobhán Haughey (HKG)	30.46	
3	4	Satomi Suzuki (JPN)	30.53	
4	3	Reona Aoki (JPN)	30.95	
5	4	Yang Chang (CHN)	31.04	
6	3	Letitia Sim (SGP)	31.22	
7	2	Adelaida Pchelintseva (KAZ)	31.28	
8	3	Jenjira Srisa-ard (THA)	31.58	
9	3	Kim Hye-jin (KOR)	31.63	
10	2	Chen Pui Lam (MAC)	31.83	
11	4	Phee Jinq En (MAS)	31.97	
12	2	Christie Chue (SGP)	32.00	
13	4	Thanya Dela Cruz (PHI)	32.06	
14	2	Ko Ha-ru (KOR)	32.09	
15	2	Lin Pei-wun (TPE)	32.15	
16	4	Lam Hoi Kiu (HKG)	32.33	
17	1	Valerie Tarazi (PLE)	33.02	
18	3	Nguyễn Thuý Hiền (VIE)	33.53	
19	3	Saovanee Boonamphai (THA)	33.77	
20	3	Sok Vorleak (CAM)	33.99	
21	4	Marina Abu Shamaleh (PLE)	34.01	
22	3	Altangereliin Myadagmaa (MGL)	38.08	
23	1	Uuganbayaryn Misheel (MGL)	39.23	
24	4	Hamna Ahmed (MDV)	41.24	
25	1	Een Abbas Shareef (MDV)	43.83	

=== Final ===
Rank	Athlete	Time	Notes
1st place, gold medalist(s)	Tang Qianting (CHN)	29.96	
2nd place, silver medalist(s)	Satomi Suzuki (JPN)	30.14	
3rd place, bronze medalist(s)	Siobhán Haughey (HKG)	30.36	
4	Yang Chang (CHN)	30.94	
5	Adelaida Pchelintseva (KAZ)	31.04	
6	Reona Aoki (JPN)	31.05	
7	Letitia Sim (SGP)	31.15	
8	Jenjira Srisa-ard (THA)	31.25	
