= Swimming at the 2026 Asian Games – Mixed 4 × 100 metre medley relay =

Mixed 4 × 100 metre medley relay at the 2026 Asian Games
- Venue: Tokyo Aquatics Centre
- Date: 23 September 2026
- Competitors: 52 from 13 nations

Medalists
| gold medal | China; Xu Jiayu, Dong Zhihao, Zhang Yufei, Yu Yiting, Li Wanwei, Qin Haiyang, Xu Fang, Cheng Yujie |
| silver medal | Japan; Hidekazu Takehara, Shin Ohashi, Rikako Ikee, Nagisa Ikemoto, Chiho Mizuguchi, Shiho Matsumoto |
| bronze medal | South Korea; Kim Seung-won, Choi Dong-yeol, An Se Hyeon, Kim Young-beom, Lee Eun-ji, Park Si-eun, Kim Ji-hun, Hwang Sun-woo |

The mixed 4 × 100 metre medley relay event at the 2026 Asian Games took place on 23 September 2026 at the Tokyo Aquatics Centre.

== Schedule ==
All times are Japan Standard Time (UTC+09:00)

| Date | Time | Event |
|---|---|---|
| Wednesday, 23 September 2026 | 11:00 | Heats |
| Wednesday, 23 September 2026 | 18:36 | Final |

== Records ==
Prior to this competition, the existing world, Asian and Games records were as follows.

| World Record | United States | 3:36.70 | Irvine, United States | 12 August 2026 |
| Asian Record | China | 3:37.55 | Paris, France | 3 August 2024 |
| Games Record | China | 3:37.73 | Hangzhou, China | 27 September 2023 |

== Results ==
=== Heats ===
| Rank | Heat | Team | Time | Notes |
|---|---|---|---|---|
| 1 | 2 | China (CHN) | 3:49.48 | Q |
| | | Li Wanwei | 1:02.11 | |
| | | Qin Haiyang | 59.90 | |
| | | Xu Fang | 53.50 | |
| | | Cheng Yujie | 53.97 | |
| 2 | 1 | Japan (JPN) | 3:49.95 | Q |
| | | Hidekazu Takehara | 54.75 | |
| | | Shin Ohashi | 1:01.08 | |
| | | Chiho Mizuguchi | 58.90 | |
| | | Shiho Matsumoto | 55.22 | |
| 3 | 2 | Hong Kong (HKG) | 3:52.27 | Q |
| | | Hayden Kwan | 55.59 | |
| | | Cheung Chi Kit Nicholas | 59.98 | |
| | | Yeung Hoi Ching | 1:01.47 | |
| | | Gilaine Ma | 55.23 | |
| 4 | 1 | Kazakhstan (KAZ) | 3:52.58 | Q |
| | | Xeniya Ignatova | 1:01.24 | |
| | | Aibat Myrzamuratov | 1:00.47 | |
| | | Adilbek Mussin | 52.08 | |
| | | Sofiya Abubakirova | 58.79 | |
| 5 | 2 | South Korea (KOR) | 3:54.02 | Q |
| | | Lee Eun-ji | 1:01.45 | |
| | | Park Si-eun | 1:08.74 | |
| | | Kim Ji-hun | 53.24 | |
| | | Hwang Sun-woo | 50.59 | |
| 6 | 1 | Indonesia (INA) | 3:54.40 | Q, NR |
| | | Flairene Candrea | 1:02.56 | |
| | | Arya Haryono | 1:01.69 | |
| | | Joe Kurniawan | 53.46 | |
| | | Adelia Chantika Aulia | 56.69 | |
| 7 | 1 | Philippines (PHI) | 3:57.12 | Q |
| | | Teia Salvino | 1:03.46 | |
| | | Gian Santos | 1:02.82 | |
| | | Logan Noguchi | 54.73 | |
| | | Heather White | 56.11 | |
| 8 | 2 | Singapore (SGP) | 4:00.58 | Q |
| | | Julian Lee | 56.32 | |
| | | Joy Neo | 1:11.87 | |
| | | Jonathan Tan | 53.83 | |
| | | Zi Yi Chan | 58.56 | |
| 9 | 2 | Thailand (THA) | 4:02.40 | |
| | | Mia Millar | 1:03.86 | |
| | | Phurichaya Junyamitree | 1:10.58 | |
| | | Surasit Thongdeang | 55.62 | |
| | | Pongpanod Trithan | 52.34 | |
| 10 | 1 | Bahrain (BRN) | 4:09.54 | |
| | | Amani Alobaidli | 1:06.85 | |
| | | Abdulla Jamal | 1:05.50 | |
| | | Ahmed Helal | 57.36 | |
| | | Asma Lefalher | 59.83 | |
| 11 | 1 | Palestine (PLE) | 4:11.76 | |
| | | Valerie Tarazi | 1:05.96 | |
| | | Alma Shaat | 1:16.56 | |
| | | Jonathan Shaheen | 56.22 | |
| | | Mahmood Abugharbia | 53.02 | |
| 12 | 2 | Mongolia (MGL) | 4:15.45 | |
| | | Ariuntamir Enkh-amgalan | 1:05.36 | |
| | | Javkhlan Uuganbaatar | 1:07.34 | |
| | | Belgudei Uyanga | 59.80 | |
| | | Orgilmaa Badrakh | 1:02.95 | |
| 13 | 2 | Maldives (MDV) | 4:34.42 | |
| | | Malaika Linda Imran | 1:19.55 | |
| | | Looth Hussain | 1:10.67 | |
| | | Mohamed Shiham | 59.93 | |
| | | Meral Latheef | 1:04.27 | |
| | 1 | Chinese Taipei (TPE) | DNS | |

=== Final ===
| Rank | Team | Time | Notes |
|---|---|---|---|
| 1st place, gold medalist(s) | China (CHN) | 3:40.38 | |
| | Xu Jiayu | 52.28 | |
| | Dong Zhihao | 58.28 | |
| | Zhang Yufei | 56.89 | |
| | Yu Yiting | 52.93 | |
| 2nd place, silver medalist(s) | Japan (JPN) | 3:43.98 | |
| | Hidekazu Takehara | 53.91 | |
| | Shin Ohashi | 57.86 | |
| | Rikako Ikee | 58.42 | |
| | Nagisa Ikemoto | 53.79 | |
| 3rd place, bronze medalist(s) | South Korea (KOR) | 3:44.12 | NR |
| | Kim Seung-won | 1:00.15 | |
| | Choi Dong-yeol | 59.04 | |
| | An Se Hyeon | 57.66 | |
| | Kim Young-beom | 47.27 | |
| 4 | Kazakhstan (KAZ) | 3:49.19 | NR |
| | Xeniya Ignatova | 1:01.61 | |
| | Aibat Myrzamuratov | 59.69 | |
| | Maxim Skazobtsov | 51.93 | |
| | Sofia Spodarenko | 55.96 | |
| 5 | Hong Kong (HKG) | 3:52.47 | |
| | Hayden Kwan | 55.65 | |
| | Cheung Chi Kit Nicholas | 59.76 | |
| | Yeung Hoi Ching | 1:01.62 | |
| | Gilaine Ma | 55.44 | |
| 6 | Indonesia (INA) | 3:54.49 | |
| | Flairene Candrea | 1:03.27 | |
| | Arya Haryono | 1:01.18 | |
| | Joe Kurniawan | 53.04 | |
| | Adelia Chantika Aulia | 57.00 | |
| 7 | Philippines (PHI) | 3:56.26 | |
| | Teia Salvino | 1:02.83 | |
| | Gian Santos | 1:02.98 | |
| | Logan Noguchi | 54.42 | |
| | Heather White | 56.03 | |
| 8 | Singapore (SGP) | 4:01.72 | |
| | Julian Lee | 56.42 | |
| | Joy Neo | 1:12.96 | |
| | Megan Yo | 1:01.45 | |
| | Ian Leong | 50.89 | |
