= Swimming at the 2026 Asian Games – Women's 100 metre breaststroke =

Women's 100 metre breaststroke at the 2026 Asian Games
- Venue: Tokyo Aquatics Centre
- Date: 23 September 2026
- Competitors: 25 from 18 nations

Medalists
gold medal	Tang Qianting	China
silver medal	Satomi Suzuki	Japan
bronze medal	Kotomi Kato	Japan

The women's 100 metre breaststroke event at the 2026 Asian Games took place on 23 September 2026 at the Tokyo Aquatics Centre.

== Schedule ==
All times are Japan Standard Time (UTC+09:00)

Date	Time	Event
Wednesday, 23 September 2026	10:45	Heats
Wednesday, 23 September 2026	17:50	Final

== Records ==
Prior to this competition, the existing world, Asian and Games records were as follows.

World Record	Lilly King (USA)	1:04.13	Budapest, Hungary	25 July 2017
Asian Record	Tang Qianting (CHN)	1:04.39	Shenzhen, China	21 April 2024
Games Record	Satomi Suzuki (JPN)	1:06.40	Jakarta, Indonesia	19 August 2018

== Results ==
=== Heats ===
Rank	Heat	Athlete	Time	Notes
1	3	Satomi Suzuki (JPN)	1:06.49	Q
2	2	Tang Qianting (CHN)	1:07.04	Q
3	3	Kotomi Kato (JPN)	1:07.67	Q
4	1	Yang Chang (CHN)	1:07.92	Q
5	3	Park Si-eun (KOR)	1:08.14	Q
6	1	Chelsie Lam (HKG)	1:09.27	Q
7	1	Lin Pei-wun (TPE)	1:09.69	Q
8	2	Phurichaya Junyamitree (THA)	1:09.77	Q, NR
9	2	Mikayla Tan (SGP)	1:09.98	Q
10	3	Chen Pui Lam (MAC)	1:09.99	Q
11	2	Lynn El Hajj (LBN)	1:10.28	Reserve
12	3	Man Wui Kiu (HKG)	1:10.48	Reserve
13	1	Adellia (INA)	1:10.79	
14	2	Thúy Nguyễn (VIE)	1:12.58	
15	1	Jiaqi Tay (SGP)	1:13.32	
16	3	Thitirat Inchai (THA)	1:14.11	
17	1	Marina Abushamaleh (PLE)	1:15.61	
18	3	Alma Shaat (PLE)	1:17.37	
19	2	Maral Batsanal (MGL)	1:17.97	
20	2	Duana Lama (NEP)	1:19.47	
21	1	Nomin-erdene Batchuluun (MGL)	1:19.89	
22	2	Hareem Malik (PAK)	1:21.12	
23	1	Mst Mukti Khatun (BAN)	1:21.84	
24	3	Meral Latheef (MDV)	1:22.06	
25	3	Tamsiri Niyomxay (LAO)	1:25.87	

=== Final ===
Rank	Athlete	Time	Notes
1st place, gold medalist(s)	Tang Qianting (CHN)	1:04.98	GR
2nd place, silver medalist(s)	Satomi Suzuki (JPN)	1:05.83	
3rd place, bronze medalist(s)	Kotomi Kato (JPN)	1:06.37	
4	Yang Chang (CHN)	1:06.80	
5	Park Si-eun (KOR)	1:07.63	
6	Chelsie Lam (HKG)	1:08.42	
7	Lin Pei-wun (TPE)	1:09.25	
8	Mikayla Tan (SGP)	1:09.43	
9	Phurichaya Junyamitree (THA)	1:09.82	
10	Chen Pui Lam (MAC)	1:10.07	
