= Swimming at the 2018 Asian Games – Women's 100 metre butterfly =

Women's 100 metre butterfly at the 2018 Asian Games
- Venue: Gelora Bung Karno Aquatic Stadium
- Date: 21 August 2018
- Competitors: 24 from 14 nations

Medalists
gold medal	Rikako Ikee	Japan
silver medal	Zhang Yufei	China
bronze medal	An Se-hyeon	South Korea

The women's 100 metre butterfly event at the 2018 Asian Games took place on 21 August at the Gelora Bung Karno Aquatic Stadium, Jakarta, Indonesia.

== Schedule ==
All times are Western Indonesia Time (UTC+07:00)

Date	Time	Event
Tuesday, 21 August 2018	09:48	Heats
Tuesday, 21 August 2018	18:57	Final

== Records ==
Prior to this competition, the existing world, Asian and Games records were as follows.

World Record	Sarah Sjöström (SWE)	55.48	Rio de Janeiro, Brazil	7 August 2016
Asian Record	Liu Zige (CHN)	56.07	Jinan, China	18 October 2009
Games Record	Chen Xinyi (CHN)	56.61	Incheon, South Korea	23 September 2014

== Results ==
=== Heats ===
Rank	Heat	Athlete	Time	Notes
1	3	Zhang Yufei (CHN)	57.68	
2	3	Rikako Ikee (JPN)	57.81	
3	2	An Se-hyeon (KOR)	58.97	
4	1	Ai Soma (JPN)	59.16	
5	2	Park Ye-rin (KOR)	59.57	
6	1	Lin Xintong (CHN)	59.94	
7	3	Quah Jing Wen (SGP)	1:00.08	
8	3	Chan Kin Lok (HKG)	1:00.39	
9	1	Quah Ting Wen (SGP)	1:00.41	
10	2	Jasmine Al-Khaldi (PHI)	1:01.04	
11	1	Lê Thị Mỹ Thảo (VIE)	1:01.26	
12	2	Chen Yu-rong (TPE)	1:01.33	
13	3	Tam Hoi Lam (HKG)	1:01.72	
14	2	Kornkarnjana Sapianchai (THA)	1:01.74	
15	1	Adinda Larasati Dewi (INA)	1:02.02	
16	2	Huang Mei-chien (TPE)	1:02.93	
17	3	Jenjira Srisa-ard (THA)	1:02.98	
18	1	Sofie Kemala Fatiha (INA)	1:05.97	
19	1	Batbayaryn Enkhkhüslen (MGL)	1:06.81	
20	3	Kuan I Cheng (MAC)	1:07.94	
21	2	Mishael Aisha Ayub (PAK)	1:09.61	
22	1	Altanshagain Kherlen (MGL)	1:11.58	
23	3	Miraal Zahra Haque (PAK)	1:17.49	
24	2	Anmau Ahmed Saleem (MDV)	1:29.46	

=== Final ===
Rank	Athlete	Time	Notes
1st place, gold medalist(s)	Rikako Ikee (JPN)	56.30	GR
2nd place, silver medalist(s)	Zhang Yufei (CHN)	57.40	
3rd place, bronze medalist(s)	An Se-hyeon (KOR)	58.00	
4	Ai Soma (JPN)	58.68	
5	Lin Xintong (CHN)	58.82	
6	Quah Jing Wen (SGP)	58.93	
7	Park Ye-rin (KOR)	59.57	
8	Chan Kin Lok (HKG)	59.94	
