= List of Thai records in swimming =

The Thai records in swimming are the fastest ever performances of swimmers from Thailand, which are recognised and ratified by the Thailand Swimming Association (TASA).

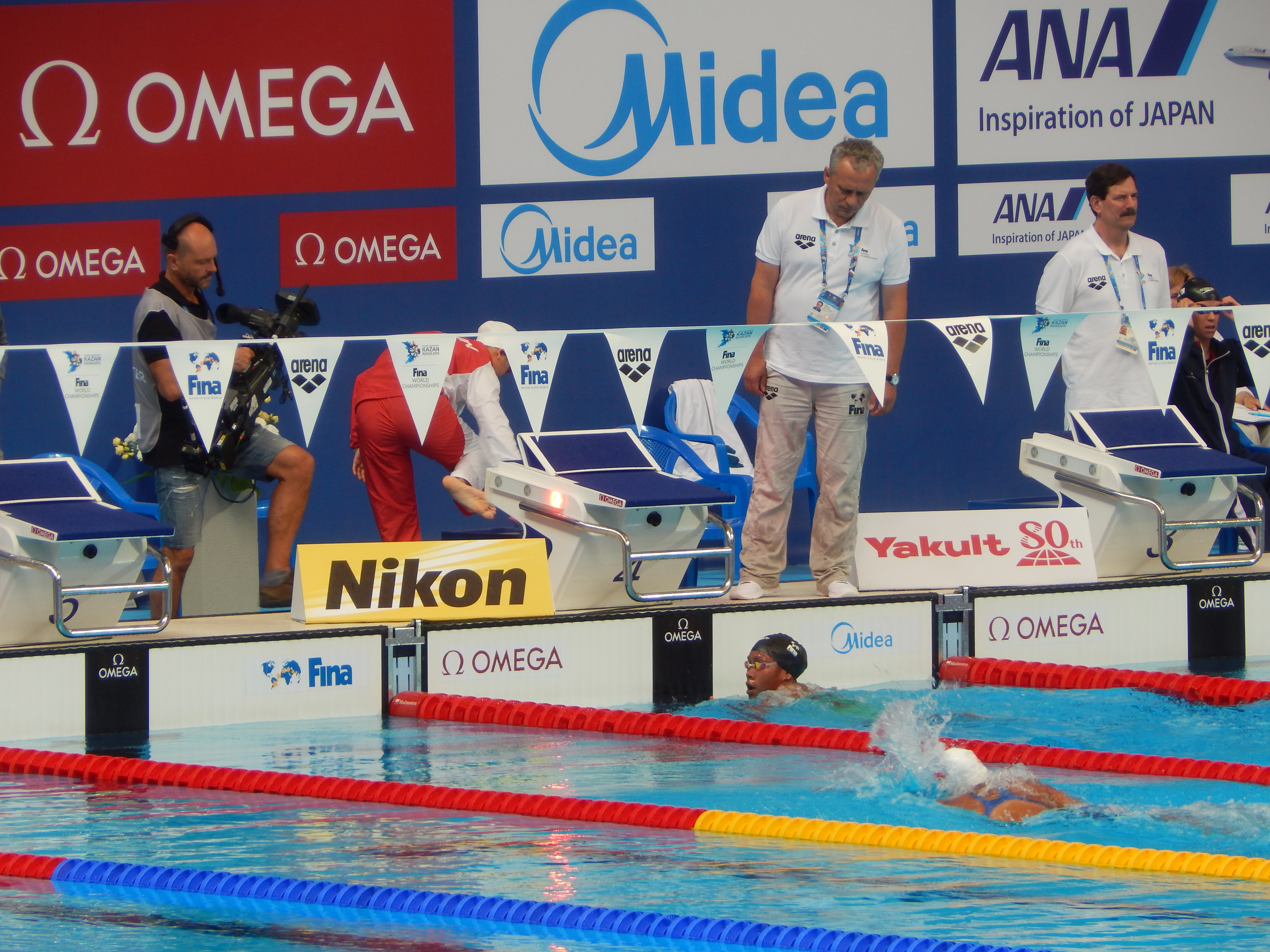
Phiangkhwan Pawapotako swims 400 metres IM in Kazan (2015)

All records were set in finals unless noted otherwise.

== Long Course (50 m) ==
=== Men ===
Event	Time		Name	Club	Date	Meet	Location	Ref
50 m freestyle	22.74		Pongpanod Trithan	Bangkok Sports School	4 April 2026	Thailand Age Group Championships	Samutprakan, Thailand	
100 m freestyle	49.03	h	Pongpanod Trithan	Thailand	20 September 2026	Asian Games	Tokyo, Japan	
200 m freestyle	1:49.29		Dulyawat Kaewsriyong	Thailand	9 May 2023	Southeast Asian Games	Phnom Penh, Cambodia	
400 m freestyle	3:53.61		Torlarp Sethsothorn	Thailand	December 1998	Asian Games	Bangkok, Thailand	
800 m freestyle	8:06.43		Ratthawit Thammanantachot	Thailand	12 June 2024	Singapore Championships	Singapore, Singapore	
1500 m freestyle	15:24.11		Torlarp Sethsothorn	Thailand	29 May 1998	National Age Group Championships	Bangkok, Thailand	
50 m backstroke	25.77		Kasipat Chograthin	Thailand	23 June 2018	Singapore Championships	Singapore, Singapore	
100 m backstroke	55.73		Tonnam Kanteemool	Thailand	24 September 2023	Asian Games	Hangzhou, China	
200 m backstroke	2:01.29		Tonnam Kanteemool	Thailand	10 May 2023	Southeast Asian Games	Phnom Penh, Cambodia	
50m breaststroke	27.19		Marrich Somridhivej	Unattached	24 April 2026	NSSC Specialty Meet	Boston, United States	
100m breaststroke	1:01.25		Marrich Somridhivej	Unattached	25 April 2026	NSSC Specialty Meet	Boston, United States	
200m breaststroke	2:12.57		Nuttapong Ketin	Thailand	7 December 2019	Southeast Asian Games	New Clark City, Philippines	
50m butterfly	24.38		Supakrid Pananuratana	Thailand	22 August 2017	Southeast Asian Games	Kuala Lumpur, Malaysia	
100m butterfly	52.98	=	Navaphat Wongcharoen	Thailand	16 May 2022	Southeast Asian Games	Hanoi, Vietnam	
100m butterfly	52.98	=	Navaphat Wongcharoen	Thailand	9 May 2023	Southeast Asian Games	Phnom Penh, Cambodia	
200m butterfly	1:58.92	b	Shareef Elaydi	Santa Clara Swim Club	23 July 2024	Speedo Summer Championships	Irvine, United States	
200m individual medley	2:01.94	b	Shareef Elaydi	Santa Clara Swim Club	27 July 2024	Speedo Summer Championships	Irvine, United States	
400m individual medley	4:18.42		Supakorn Chotikul	Thailand	2 April 2016	National Age Group Championships	Samutprakarn, Thailand	
4×100m freestyle relay	3:18.73		Skye Sharples (50.38); Tonnam Kanteemool (49.98); Surasit Thongdeang (49.70); Pongpanod Trithan (48.67)	Thailand	24 September 2026	Asian Games	Tokyo, Japan	
4×200m freestyle relay	7:21.08		Pongpanod Trithan (1:49.51); Wongsakorn Patsamarn (1:50.86); Tonnam Kanteemool (1:50.64); Surasit Thongdeang (1:50.07)	Thailand	21 September 2026	Asian Games	Tokyo, Japan	
4×100m medley relay	3:38.84		Tonnam Kanteemool (56.20); Marrich Somridhivej (1:01.16); Surasit Thongdeang (53.12); Pongpanod Trithan (48.36)	Thailand	22 September 2026	Asian Games	Tokyo, Japan	

Legend: # – Record awaiting ratification by TASA; WR – World record; AS – Asian record; e – equalled existing record;
Records not set in finals: h – heat; sf – semifinal; r – relay 1st leg; rh – relay heat 1st leg; b – B final; † – en route to final mark; so – swim-off; tt – time trial

=== Women ===
Event	Time		Name	Club	Date	Meet	Location	Ref
50m freestyle	25.01	b	Jenjira Srisaard	De Dolfijn	14 April 2024	Eindhoven Qualification Meet	Eindhoven, Netherlands	
100m freestyle	55.95		Natthanan Junkrajang	Thailand	20 March 2016	Singapore Age Group Championships	Singapore, Singapore	
200m freestyle	2:00.54		Natthanan Junkrajang	Thailand	9 June 2015	Southeast Asian Games	Singapore, Singapore	
400m freestyle	4:11.23		Sarisa Suwannachet	Thailand	22 August 2014	Youth Olympic Games	Nanjing, China	
800m freestyle	8:43.00		Sarisa Suwannachet	Thailand	25 September 2014	Asian Games	Incheon, South Korea	
1500 m freestyle	16:58.11		Kamonchanok Kwanmuang	Thailand	27 February 2024	Asian Age Group Championships	New Clark City, Philippines	
50m backstroke	28.84		Saovanee Boonamphai	Thailand	11 December 2025	Southeast Asian Games	Bangkok, Thailand	
100m backstroke	1:02.52		Mia Miller	Thailand	13 December 2025	Southeast Asian Games	Bangkok, Thailand	
200m backstroke	2:13.95		Mia Miller	Thailand	12 December 2025	Southeast Asian Games	Bangkok, Thailand	
50m breaststroke	31.22		Jenjira Srisaard	Thailand	6 May 2023	Southeast Asian Games	Phnom Penh, Cambodia	
100m breaststroke	1:09.77	h	Phurichaya Junyamitree	Thailand	24 September 2026	Asian Games	Tokyo, Japan	
200m breaststroke	2:28.00		Pimchanok Chinveeraphan	Thailand	24 September 2026	Asian Games	Tokyo, Japan	
50m butterfly	26.50		Jenjira Srisaard	Thailand	29 February 2024	Asian Age Group Championships	New Clark City, Philippines	
100m butterfly	59.66		Napatsawan Jaritkla	Peak Performance Swim Club	8 April 2025	Thailand Age Group Championships	Samut Prakan, Thailand	
200m butterfly	2:09.70		Kamonchanok Kwanmuang	Thailand	16 June 2025	French Championships	Montpellier, France	
200m individual medley	2:14.79		Kamonchanok Kwanmuang	Thailand	25 September 2023	Asian Games	Hangzhou, China	
400m individual medley	4:44.04		Kamonchanok Kwanmuang	Thailand	27 September 2023	Asian Games	Hangzhou, China	
4×100m freestyle relay	3:45.93		Manita Sathianchokwisan (56.73); Kornkarnjana Sapianchai (55.86); Jenjira Srisaard (57.06); Natthanan Junkrajang (56.28)	Thailand	19 August 2018	Asian Games	Jakarta, Indonesia	
4×200m freestyle relay	8:10.10		Jinjutha Pholjamjumrus (2:02.43); Maria Nedelko (2:01.92); Kamonchanok Kwanmuang (2:01.46); Napatsawan Jaritkla (2:04.29)	Thailand	14 December 2025	Southeast Asian Games	Bangkok, Thailand	
4×100m medley relay	4:11.43		Mia Miller (1:03.42); Phurichaya Junyamitree (1:09.44); Jinjutha Pholjamjumrus (1:01.57); Maria Nedelko (57.00)	Thailand	22 September 2026	Asian Games	Tokyo, Japan	

Legend: # – Record awaiting ratification by TASA; WR – World record; AS – Asian record; e – equalled existing record;
Records not set in finals: h – heat; sf – semifinal; r – relay 1st leg; rh – relay heat 1st leg; b – B final; † – en route to final mark; so – swim-off; tt – time trial

=== Mixed relay ===
Event	Time	Name	Club	Date	Meet	Location	Ref
4×50m freestyle relay							
4×100m freestyle relay	3:39.17	Kitiphat Pipimnan; Navaphat Wongcharoen; Fonpray Yamsuan; Natthanan Junkrajang	Thailand	25 September 2019	Asian Age Group Championships	Bangalore, India	
4×50m medley relay							
4×100m medley relay	3:58.18	Saovanee Boonamphai (1:05.53); Dulyawat Kaewsriyong (1:02.05); Navaphat Wongcharoen (53.03); Kamonchanok Kwanmuang (57.57)	Thailand	9 May 2023	Southeast Asian Games	Phnom Penh, Cambodia	

Legend: # – Record awaiting ratification by TASA; WR – World record; AS – Asian record; e – equalled existing record;
Records not set in finals: h – heat; so – swim-off

== Short Course (25 m) ==
=== Men ===
Event	Time		Name	Club	Date	Meet	Location	Ref
50m freestyle	21.98		Pongpanod Trithan	Bangkok Sports School	13 August 2026	Thailand Age Group Championships	Bangkok, Thailand	
100m freestyle	48.71	h	Andrew Digby	Thailand	16 November 2018	World Cup	Singapore, Singapore	
200m freestyle	1:46.95	h	Andrew Digby	Thailand	17 November 2018	World Cup	Singapore, Singapore	
400m freestyle	3:49.01	h	Tonnam Kanteemool	Thailand	16 December 2021	World Championships	Abu Dhabi, United Arab Emirates	
800m freestyle	7:55.24		Ratthawit Thammanantachot	Thailand	17 December 2022	World Championships	Melbourne, Australia	
1500m freestyle	15:17.17		Torlarp Sethsothorn	-	20 December 1996	Austria Open		
50m backstroke	24.63	h	Kasipat Chograthin	Thailand	13 December 2018	World Championships	Hangzhou, China	
100m backstroke	53.78		Tonnam Kanteemool	Singha Swimming Club	24 December 2023	Thailand Age Group Championships	Samutprakan, Thailand	
200m backstroke	1:59.04		Ratthawit Thammanantachot	Bangkok Elite Swim Team	22 October 2021	World Championships Trials #2	Samut Prakan, Thailand	
50 m breaststroke	26.76	h	Marrich Somridhivej	Cardinal Aquatics	30 October 2026	World Championship Trials	Westmont, United States	
100m breaststroke	59.29	tt	Marrich Somridhivej	Cardinal Aquatics	30 October 2026	World Championship Trials	Westmont, United States	
200m breaststroke	2:12.05		Prasobchai Kaewrungrueang	-	20 September 2021	World Championships Trials #1	Samut Prakan, Thailand	
50 m butterfly	24.07		Krirkchai Rattananosoth	-	7 February 2026	The Marlin Mayhem	Bangkok, Thailand	
50m butterfly	23.78	h, not ratified	Andrew Digby	Thailand	17 November 2018	World Cup	Singapore, Singapore	
100m butterfly	52.19	h	Navaphat Wongcharoen	Thailand	17 December 2022	World Championships	Melbourne, Australia	
200m butterfly	1:56.37	h	Navaphat Wongcharoen	Thailand	15 December 2022	World Championships	Melbourne, Australia	
200m butterfly	1:55.29	not ratified	Navaphat Wongcharoen	Bangkok Elite Swim Team	22 September 2024	Thailand Age Group Championships	Samutprakan, Thailand	
100m individual medley	54.81	=	Radomyos Matjiur	Thailand	25 September 2017	Asian Indoor and Martial Arts Games	Ashgabat, Turkmenistan	
100m individual medley	54.81	h, =	Dulyawat Kaewsriyong	Thailand	15 December 2022	World Championships	Melbourne, Australia	
200m individual medley	1:59.25		Dulyawat Kaewsriyong	Bangkok Elite Swim Team	21 December 2023	Thailand Age Group Championships	Samutprakan, Thailand	
400m individual medley	4:26.48		Paripat Pimprae	Bangkok Elite Swim Team	22 December 2023	Thailand Age Group Championships	Samutprakan, Thailand	
400m individual medley	4:21.20	h, not ratified	Navaphat Wongcharoen	Bangkok Elite Swim Team	29 September 2024	Thailand Age Group Championships	Samutprakan, Thailand	
4×50m freestyle relay	1:30.29		Andrew Newling (22.69); Radomyos Matjiur (22.78); Kitiphat Pipimnan (22.15); Siwat Matangkapong (22.67)	Thailand	24 September 2017	Asian Indoor and Martial Arts Games	Ashgabat, Turkmenistan	
4×100m freestyle relay	3:22.32		Papungkorn Ingkanont (51.08); Napat Wesshasartar; Sarit Tiewong; Siwat Matangkapong	Thailand	1 July 2013	Asian Indoor and Martial Arts Games	Incheon, South Korea	
4×200m freestyle relay								
4×50m medley relay	1:40.09		Kasipat Chograthin (25.80); Sittivech Kongsomrerk; Chatmongkon Noiaree; Gavin Alexander Lewis	Thailand	30 June 2013	Asian Indoor and Martial Arts Games	Incheon, South Korea	
4×100m medley relay	3:42.94		Kasipat Chograthin (56.15); Sittivech Kongsomrerk; Siwat Matangkapong; Sarit Tiewong	Thailand	3 July 2013	Asian Indoor and Martial Arts Games	Incheon, South Korea	

Legend: # – Record awaiting ratification by TASA; WR – World record; AS – Asian record; e – equalled existing record;
Records not set in finals: h – heat; sf – semifinal; r – relay 1st leg; rh – relay heat 1st leg; b – B final; † – en route to final mark; so – swim-off; tt – time trial

=== Women ===
Event	Time		Name	Club	Date	Meet	Location	Ref
50 m freestyle	24.39	h	Jenjira Srisaard	Thailand	14 December 2024	World Championships	Budapest, Hungary	
100 m freestyle	54.92		Natthanan Junkrajang	Thailand	3 July 2013	Asian Indoor and Martial Arts Games	Incheon, South Korea	
200 m freestyle	1:58.25		Natthanan Junkrajang	Thailand	2 July 2013	Asian Indoor and Martial Arts Games	Incheon, South Korea	
400 m freestyle	4:15.04		Kamonchanok Kwanmuang	-	22 October 2021	World Championships Trials #2	Samut Prakan, Thailand	
800 m freestyle	8:39.81	h	Kamonchanok Kwanmuang	Thailand	17 December 2021	World Championships	Abu Dhabi, United Arab Emirates	
1500 m freestyle								
50 m backstroke	27.76		Natthanan Junkrajang	Thailand	1 July 2013	Asian Indoor and Martial Arts Games	Incheon, South Korea	
100 m backstroke	1:00.02		Mia Millar	Singha	16 August 2026	Thailand Age Group Championships	Bangkok, Thailand	
200 m backstroke	2:09.98		Mia Millar	Singha	13 August 2026	Thailand Age Group Championships	Bangkok, Thailand	
50m breaststroke	30.48 (Note: by official result source; 30.44 by TASA source, a typo)	h, =	Jenjira Srisaard	Thailand	17 December 2022	World Championships	Melbourne, Australia	
50m breaststroke	30.48	h, =	Jenjira Srisaard	Thailand	14 December 2024	World Championships	Budapest, Hungary	
100m breaststroke	1:08.29		Phurichaya Junyamitree	Singha Swimming Club	21 December 2023	Thailand Age Group Championships	Samutprakan, Thailand	
200m breaststroke	2:25.49		Pimchanok Chinveeraphan	Wellington College	15 August 2026	Thailand Age Group Championships	Bangkok, Thailand	
50m butterfly	25.78	h, so	Jenjira Srisaard	Thailand	13 December 2022	World Championships	Melbourne, Australia	
50m butterfly	25.26	sf, not ratified	Jenjira Srisaard	Thailand	10 December 2024	World Championships	Budapest, Hungary	
100m butterfly	59.77		Patarawadee Kittiya	Thailand	2 October 2016	World Championships Trials	Thailand	
200 m butterfly	2:09.87		Jinjutha Pholjamjumrus	F1RST	16 August 2026	Thailand Age Group Championships	Bangkok, Thailand	
100m individual medley	1:02.48		Kamonchanok Kwanmuang	Bangkok Elite Swim Team	24 December 2023	Thailand Age Group Championships	Samutprakan, Thailand	
100m individual medley	1:01.94	not ratified	Phiangkhwan Pawapotako	F1RST Swim Team	22 September 2024	Thailand Age Group Championships	Samutprakan, Thailand	
200m individual medley	2:12.93		Kamonchanok Kwanmuang	Bangkok Elite Swim Team	21 December 2023	Thailand Age Group Championships	Samutprakan, Thailand	
400m individual medley	4:40.84		Jinjutha Pholjamjumrus	Thailand	24 October 2019	Hancock Prospecting Championships	Melbourne, Australia	
4×50m freestyle relay	1:41.16		Jenjira Srisaard (24.95); Supasuta Sounthornchote (25.89); Pusanisa Sangplong (25.54); Natthanan Junkrajang (24.78)	Thailand	24 September 2017	Asian Indoor and Martial Arts Games	Ashgabat, Turkmenistan	
4×100m freestyle relay	3:42.96		Natthanan Junkrajang (55.29); Jenjira Srisaard; Nichapat Kaewpongmongkol; Benjaporn Sriphanomthorn	Thailand	1 July 2013	Asian Indoor and Martial Arts Games	Incheon, South Korea	
4×200m freestyle relay								
4×50m medley relay	1:51.64		Juthamas Sutthison (29.25); Jenjira Srisaard (30.44); Supasuta Sounthornchote (27.42); Natthanan Junkrajang (24.53)	Thailand	22 September 2017	Asian Indoor and Martial Arts Games	Ashgabat, Turkmenistan	
4×100m medley relay	4:06.37			Thailand	3 July 2013	Asian Indoor and Martial Arts Games	Incheon, South Korea	

Legend: # – Record awaiting ratification by TASA; WR – World record; AS – Asian record; e – equalled existing record;
Records not set in finals: h – heat; sf – semifinal; r – relay 1st leg; rh – relay heat 1st leg; b – B final; † – en route to final mark; so – swim-off; tt – time trial

=== Mixed relay ===
Event	Time		Name	Club	Date	Meet	Location	Ref
4×50 m freestyle relay	1:36.58	h	Supha Sangaworawong (22.91); Tonnam Kanteemool (22.91); Kornkarnjana Sapianchai (25.98); Jenjira Srisaard (24.78)	Thailand	17 December 2021	World Championships	Abu Dhabi, United Arab Emirates	
4×50 m medley relay	1:45.17	h	Saovanee Boonamphai (28.37); Jenjira Srisaard (30.03); Surasit Thongdeang (24.16); Pongpanod Trithan (22.61)	Thailand	11 December 2024	World Championships	Budapest, Hungary	

Legend: # – Record awaiting ratification by TASA; e – equalled existing record;
Records not set in finals: h – heat; so – swim-off
