= Kotomi Kato =

Japanese swimmer

Personal information
- Native name: 加藤 心冨
- Nationality: Japanese
- Born: 5 January 2006 (age 20) Japan

Sport
- Sport: Swimming
- Club: Swin Konosu
Medal record
Women's swimming
Representing Japan
Asian Games
Gold medal – first place	2026 Aichi–Nagoya	200 m breaststroke
Bronze medal – third place	2026 Aichi–Nagoya	100 m breaststroke

Kotomi Kato (Japanese: 加藤 心冨, born 5 January 2006) is a Japanese swimmer who specializes in breaststroke. She represents Waseda University and Swin Konosu. Kato won the gold medal in the women's 200 metre breaststroke and the bronze medal in the women's 100 metre breaststroke at the 2026 Asian Games in Aichi-Nagoya.

== Career ==
Kato was born on 5 January 2006. She attended Kasukabe Kyoei High School before entering Waseda University. She competes for Swin Konosu and specializes in the breaststroke events.

At the 2024 World Aquatics Swimming Championships (25 m), Kato was part of the Japanese women's 4 × 100 metre medley relay team. At the 2024 Japan National Swimming Championships (25 m), she won the 100 metre and 200 metre breaststroke titles.

At the 2025 World Aquatics Championships in Singapore, Kato competed in the women's 200 metre breaststroke, finishing 22nd in the heats.

In March 2026, Kato won the women's 200 metre breaststroke at the Japan Swimming Championships, finishing ahead of Satomi Suzuki and Yuzuki Kagiya. She also finished second in both the 50 metre and 100 metre breaststroke events.

At the 2026 Asian Games, Kato won the women's 200 metre breaststroke gold medal in 2:22.57, defeating South Korea's Park Si-eun by 0.12 seconds. She also won bronze in the women's 100 metre breaststroke, while finishing fourth in the 50 metre event.
