= Tang Qianting =

Chinese swimmer (born 2004)

Personal information
- Nationality: Chinese
- Born: 14 March 2004 (age 22) Shanghai, China
- Height: 180 cm (5 ft 11 in)

Sport
- Sport: Swimming
- Strokes: Breaststroke
Medal record
Women's swimming
Representing China
Olympic Games
Silver medal – second place	2024 Paris	100 m breaststroke
Silver medal – second place	2024 Paris	4×100 m mixed medley
Bronze medal – third place	2024 Paris	4×100 m medley
World Championships (LC)
Gold medal – first place	2024 Doha	100 m breaststroke
Silver medal – second place	2024 Doha	50 m breaststroke
Silver medal – second place	2025 Singapore	50 m breaststroke
Bronze medal – third place	2025 Singapore	100 m breaststroke
Bronze medal – third place	2025 Singapore	4×100 m medley
World Championships (SC)
Gold medal – first place	2021 Abu Dhabi	100 m breaststroke
Gold medal – first place	2024 Budapest	100 m breaststroke
Silver medal – second place	2024 Budapest	50 m breaststroke
Bronze medal – third place	2021 Abu Dhabi	4×100 m medley
Bronze medal – third place	2024 Budapest	4×100 m medley
Pan Pacific Championships
Gold medal – first place	2026 Irvine	50 m breaststroke
Silver medal – second place	2026 Irvine	100 m breaststroke
Bronze medal – third place	2026 Irvine	4×100 m medley
Asian Games
Gold medal – first place	2022 Hangzhou	50 m breaststroke
Gold medal – first place	2026 Aichi–Nagoya	50 m breaststroke
Gold medal – first place	2026 Aichi–Nagoya	100 m breaststroke
Gold medal – first place	2026 Aichi–Nagoya	4×100 m medley

Tang Qianting (simplified Chinese: 唐钱婷; traditional Chinese: 唐錢婷; pinyin: Táng Qiántíng; born 14 March 2004) is a Chinese swimmer. She competed at the 2020 Summer Olympics. She later competed and won a silver in both the 100 m breaststroke and 4 × 100 m mixed medley events in addition to a bronze in the 4 x 100 m medley event at the 2024 Summer Olympics.

== Personal bests ==
As of 21 December 2021

=== Long course (50-meter pool) ===
Event	Time	Meet	Date	Note(s)
50 m freestyle	25.88	2020 Chinese National Championships	28 September 2020	
100 m freestyle	56.58	2020 Chinese National Championships	27 September 2020	
50 m breaststroke	30.80	2020 Summer Olympics	26 July 2021	
100 m breaststroke	1.05.82	2021 National Games of China	21 September 2021	
200 m breaststroke	2.24.26	2021 National Games of China	24 September 2021	
100 m butterfly	1.01.72	2021 Chinese National Championships	30 April 2021	
200 m individual medley	2.18.51	2020 Chinese National Championships	1 October 2020	

=== Short course (25-meter pool) ===
Event	Time	Meet	Date	Note(s)
50 m freestyle	25.31	Irish National Championships	12 December 2019	
100 m freestyle	56.55	2018 World Cup	4 November 2018	
50 m breast stroke	29.79	2021 World Championships	20 December 2021	
100 m breast stroke	1:03.47	2021 World Championships	20 December 2021	NR, AS
100 m individual medley	59.01	2021 World Championships	18 December 2021	

Key: NR = National Record; AS = Asian Record
