= Swimming at the 2026 Asian Games – Women's 4 × 100 metre medley relay =

Women's 4 × 100 metre medley relay at the 2026 Asian Games
- Venue: Tokyo Aquatics Centre
- Date: 25 September 2026
- Competitors: 44 from 11 nations

Medalists
gold medal	China; Peng Xuwei, Tang Qianting, Zhang Yufei, Yu Yiting, Li Wanwei, Yang Chang, Cheng Yujie
silver medal	Japan; Rio Shirai, Satomi Suzuki, Rikako Ikee, Nagisa Ikemoto, Chiho Mizuguchi
bronze medal	South Korea; Kim Seung-won, Park Si-eun, An Se-hyeon, Hur Yeon-kyung, Lee Eun-ji, Lee Song-eun, Jo Hyun-ju

The women's 4 × 100 metre medley relay event at the 2026 Asian Games took place on 25 September 2026 at the Tokyo Aquatics Centre.

== Schedule ==
All times are Japan Standard Time (UTC+09:00)

Date	Time	Event
Friday, 25 September 2026	11:36	Heats
Friday, 25 September 2026	18:38	Final

== Records ==
Prior to this competition, the existing world, Asian and Games records were as follows.

World Record	United States	3:49.34	Singapore	3 August 2025
Asian Record	China	3:52.19	Rome, Italy	1 August 2009
Games Record	Japan	3:54.73	Jakarta, Indonesia	23 August 2018

== Results ==
=== Heats ===
Rank	Heat	Team	Time	Notes
1	2	China (CHN)	3:59.79	
		Li Wanwei	1:00.69	
		Yang Chang	1:07.09	
		Yu Yiting	58.01	
		Cheng Yujie	54.00	
2	1	Japan (JPN)	4:01.04	
		Rio Shirai	1:00.00	
		Satomi Suzuki	1:06.91	
		Chiho Mizuguchi	59.02	
		Nagisa Ikemoto	55.11	
3	2	South Korea (KOR)	4:05.83	
		Lee Eun-ji	1:00.18	
		Park Si-eun	1:08.35	
		Lee Song-eun	1:00.96	
		Jo Hyun-ju	56.34	
4	1	Chinese Taipei (TPE)	4:08.83	NR
		Chang Ya-jia	1:02.33	
		Lin Pei-wun	1:09.08	
		Han An-chi	1:00.36	
		Liu Pei-yin	57.06	
5	2	Hong Kong (HKG)	4:10.62	
		Cheung Sum Yuet	1:03.00	
		Man Wui Kiu	1:10.55	
		Yeung Hoi Ching	1:01.33	
		Ma Gilaine	55.74	
6	2	Singapore (SGP)	4:11.98	
		Julia Shu Ning Yeo	1:04.24	
		Mikayla Tan	1:09.03	
		Megan Yo	1:01.45	
		Victoria Lim	57.26	
7	1	Thailand (THA)	4:12.72	
		Mia Millar	1:03.39	
		Phurichaya Junyamitree	1:10.16	
		Varissara Nopthong	1:02.00	
		Maria Nedelko	57.17	
8	2	Indonesia (INA)	4:15.90	
		Flairene Candrea	1:03.03	
		Adellia	1:12.08	
		Nadia Aisha Nurazmi	1:03.56	
		Adelia Chantika Aulia	57.23	
9	1	Macau (MAC)	4:19.84	Reserve
		Wong Un Lao	1:05.38	
		Chen Pui Lam	1:10.75	
		Cheang Weng Chi	1:05.41	
		Chan Mei Yan	58.30	
10	1	Palestine (PLE)	4:33.28	Reserve
		Valerie Tarazi	1:05.54	
		Marina Abushamaleh	1:15.92	
		Farah Fares	1:09.43	
		Maya Khalil	1:02.39	
11	2	Mongolia (MGL)	4:56.39	
		Sodonchimeg Sodovjamts	1:17.02	
		Maral Batsanal	1:19.22	
		Khandarmaa Batsukh	1:16.38	
		Orgilmaa Badrakh	1:03.77	
	1	Philippines (PHI)	DNS	

=== Final ===
Rank	Team	Time	Notes
1st place, gold medalist(s)	China (CHN)	3:54.55	GR
	Peng Xuwei	59.20	
	Tang Qianting	1:05.74	
	Zhang Yufei	56.30	
	Yu Yiting	53.31	
2nd place, silver medalist(s)	Japan (JPN)	3:57.64	
	Rio Shirai	59.97	
	Satomi Suzuki	1:05.13	
	Rikako Ikee	58.17	
	Nagisa Ikemoto	54.37	
3rd place, bronze medalist(s)	South Korea (KOR)	4:00.67	
	Kim Seung-won	1:00.00	
	Park Si-eun	1:07.39	
	An Se-hyeon	58.04	
	Hur Yeon-kyung	55.24	
4	Chinese Taipei (TPE)	4:04.86	NR
	Chang Ya-jia	1:01.56	
	Lin Pei-wun	1:08.31	
	Han An-chi	59.19	
	Liu Pei-yin	55.80	
5	Hong Kong (HKG)	4:06.27	
	Cheung Sum Yuet	1:01.45	
	Lam Chelsie	1:08.70	
	Yeung Hoi Ching	1:01.01	
	Ma Gilaine	55.11	
6	Singapore (SGP)	4:09.90	
	Julia Shu Ning Yeo	1:02.98	
	Mikayla Tan	1:08.99	
	Megan Yo	1:01.12	
	Victoria Lim	56.81	
7	Thailand (THA)	4:11.43	NR
	Mia Millar	1:03.42	
	Phurichaya Junyamitree	1:09.44	
	Jinjutha Pholjamjumrus	1:01.57	
	Maria Nedelko	57.00	
8	Macau (MAC)	4:18.73	
	Wong Un Lao	1:04.73	
	Chen Pui Lam	1:09.74	
	Cheang Weng Chi	1:05.39	
	Chan Mei Yan	58.87	
