= 2022 FINA World Swimming Championships (25 m) – Men's 800 metre freestyle =

Swimming competition

Men's 800 metre freestyle at the 2022 FINA World Swimming Championships (25 m)
- Venue: Melbourne Sports and Aquatic Centre
- Location: Melbourne, Australia
- Dates: 17 December
- Competitors: 23 from 20 nations
- Winning time: 7:29.99 CR

Medalists
gold medal	Gregorio Paltrinieri	Italy
silver medal	Henrik Christiansen	Norway
bronze medal	Logan Fontaine	France

The Men's 800 metre freestyle competition of the 2022 FINA World Swimming Championships (25 m) was held on 17 December 2022.

== Records ==
Prior to the competition, the existing world and championship records were as follows.

World record	Grant Hackett (AUS)	7:23.42	Melbourne, Australia	20 July 2008
Competition record	best time	7:30.31	Hangzhou, China	16 December 2018

The following new records were set during this competition:

Date	Event	Name	Nationality	Time	Record
17 December	Final	Gregorio Paltrinieri	Italy	7:29.99	CR

== Results ==
The slowest heats were started at 13:12, and the fastest heat at 19:50.

Rank	Heat	Lane	Name	Nationality	Time	Notes
1st place, gold medalist(s)	3	4	Gregorio Paltrinieri	Italy	7:29.99	CR
2nd place, silver medalist(s)	3	2	Henrik Christiansen	Norway	7:31.48	
3rd place, bronze medalist(s)	3	3	Logan Fontaine	France	7:33.12	
4	3	8	Shogo Takeda	Japan	7:33.78	AS
5	3	5	David Johnston	United States	7:34.33	
6	2	6	Joris Bouchaut	France	7:35.12	
7	2	5	Marwan Elkamash	Egypt	7:36.01	NR
8	2	7	Charlie Clark	United States	7:37.54	
9	3	7	Mack Horton	Australia	7:40.64	
10	2	1	Ondřej Gemov	Czech Republic	7:42.70	
11	1	5	Carlos Garach	Spain	7:44.53	
12	2	8	Kim Woo-min	South Korea	7:45.29	
13	2	4	Mert Kılavuz	Turkey	7:47.57	
14	3	1	Alexander Grant	Australia	7:48.25	
15	2	2	Lucas Alba	Argentina	7:49.53	NR
16	2	6	Louis Clark	New Zealand	7:53.36	
17	1	6	Ratthawit Thammananthachote	Thailand	7:55.24	NR
18	1	4	Jon Jøntvedt	Norway	7:55.93	
19	1	3	Jakub Poliačik	Slovakia	8:05.91	
20	1	1	Rodolfo Falcón	Cuba	8:11.47	
21	1	7	Yordan Yanchev	Bulgaria	8:17.85	
22	1	8	Lin Sizhuang	Macau	8:21.81	NR
23	1	2	Dylan Cachia	Malta	8:22.71	
	2	3	Victor Johansson	Sweden	Did not start	
