= Swimming at the 2018 Asian Games – Mixed 4 × 100 metre medley relay =

Mixed 4 × 100 metre medley relay at the 2018 Asian Games
- Venue: Gelora Bung Karno Aquatic Stadium
- Date: 22 August 2018
- Competitors: 66 from 14 nations

Medalists
gold medal	China; Xu Jiayu, Yan Zibei, Zhang Yufei, Zhu Menghui, Li Guangyuan, Shi Jinglin, Zheng Xiaojing, Yang Junxuan
silver medal	Japan; Ryosuke Irie, Yasuhiro Koseki, Rikako Ikee, Tomomi Aoki, Masaki Kaneko, Ippei Watanabe, Mayuka Yamamoto
bronze medal	South Korea; Lee Ju-ho, Moon Jae-kwon, An Se-hyeon, Ko Mi-so, Kang Ji-seok, Kim Jae-youn, Park Ye-rin, Kim Min-ju

The mixed 4 × 100 metre medley relay event at the 2018 Asian Games took place on 22 August at the Gelora Bung Karno Aquatic Stadium.

== Schedule ==
All times are Western Indonesia Time (UTC+07:00)

Date	Time	Event
Wednesday, 22 August 2018	10:32	Heats
Wednesday, 22 August 2018	19:50	Final

== Records ==
Prior to this competition, the existing world, Asian and Games records were as follows.

World Record	United States	3:38.56	Budapest, Hungary	26 July 2017
Asian Record	Japan	3:40.98	Tokyo, Japan	9 August 2018
Games Record	—	—	—	—

== Results ==
Legend

- DNS — Did not start
- DSQ — Disqualified

=== Heats ===
Rank	Heat	Team	Time	Notes
1	1	Japan (JPN)	3:48.89	GR
		Masaki Kaneko	54.65	
		Ippei Watanabe	1:00.34	
		Rikako Ikee	58.16	
		Mayuka Yamamoto	55.74	
2	2	China (CHN)	3:53.29	
		Li Guangyuan	54.52	
		Shi Jinglin	1:07.36	
		Zheng Xiaojing	53.22	
		Yang Junxuan	58.19	
3	1	South Korea (KOR)	3:55.46	
		Kang Ji-seok	55.55	
		Kim Jae-youn	1:02.96	
		Park Ye-rin	1:00.34	
		Kim Min-ju	56.61	
4	2	Indonesia (INA)	3:55.56	
		I Gede Siman Sudartawa	55.41	
		Anandia Evato	1:10.12	
		Glenn Victor Sutanto	53.34	
		Patricia Yosita Hapsari	56.69	
5	1	Hong Kong (HKG)	3:56.62	
		Lau Shiu Yue	57.82	
		Kenneth To	1:00.94	
		Chan Kin Lok	1:01.38	
		Sze Hang Yu	56.48	
6	2	Chinese Taipei (TPE)	3:58.31	
		Chuang Mu-lun	56.55	
		Lee Hsuan-yen	1:02.30	
		Huang Mei-chien	1:01.63	
		Chen Yu-rong	57.83	
7	2	Singapore (SGP)	3:59.87	
		Francis Fong	57.05	
		Samantha Yeo	1:10.86	
		Ong Jung Yi	54.76	
		Marina Chan	57.20	
8	2	Thailand (THA)	4:05.88	
		Kasipat Chograthin	58.99	
		Saovanee Boonamphai	1:12.84	
		Nuttapong Ketin	56.77	
		Manita Sathianchokwisan	57.28	
9	2	Macau (MAC)	4:07.29	
		Erica Vong	1:06.61	
		Chao Man Hou	1:02.43	
		Sio Ka Kun	59.01	
		Tan Chi Yan	59.24	
10	1	Mongolia (MGL)	4:22.76	
		Erdenemönkhiin Demüül	1:03.28	
		Günsennorovyn Zandanbal	1:08.95	
		Batbayaryn Enkhkhüslen	1:07.78	
		Khuyagbaataryn Enkhzul	1:02.75	
11	1	Pakistan (PAK)	4:31.25	
		Haseeb Tariq	1:03.76	
		Muhammad Hamza Malik	1:16.17	
		Mishael Aisha Ayub	1:08.75	
		Bisma Khan	1:02.57	
12	1	Maldives (MDV)	5:06.67	
		Aishath Sausan	1:19.48	
		Aishath Sajina	1:33.01	
		Mubal Azzam Ibrahim	1:12.00	
		Ali Imaan	1:02.18	
—	1	Cambodia (CAM)	DNS	
		—		
		—		
		—		
		—		
—	2	Tajikistan (TJK)	DNS	
		—		
		—		
		—		
		—		

=== Final ===
Rank	Team	Time	Notes
1st place, gold medalist(s)	China (CHN)	3:40.45	AR
	Xu Jiayu	52.30	
	Yan Zibei	58.45	
	Zhang Yufei	56.61	
	Zhu Menghui	53.09	
2nd place, silver medalist(s)	Japan (JPN)	3:41.21	
	Ryosuke Irie	52.55	
	Yasuhiro Koseki	58.95	
	Rikako Ikee	55.68	
	Tomomi Aoki	54.03	
3rd place, bronze medalist(s)	South Korea (KOR)	3:49.27	
	Lee Ju-ho	55.36	
	Moon Jae-kwon	1:00.71	
	An Se-hyeon	57.93	
	Ko Mi-so	55.27	
4	Hong Kong (HKG)	3:50.22	
	Stephanie Au	1:00.52	
	Kenneth To	1:00.63	
	Nicholas Lim	53.75	
	Camille Cheng	55.32	
5	Indonesia (INA)	3:55.37	
	I Gede Siman Sudartawa	55.14	
	Anandia Evato	1:10.31	
	Glenn Victor Sutanto	53.36	
	Patricia Yosita Hapsari	56.56	
6	Chinese Taipei (TPE)	3:58.30	
	Chuang Mu-lun	56.49	
	Lee Hsuan-yen	1:02.24	
	Huang Mei-chien	1:01.95	
	Chen Yu-rong	57.62	
7	Thailand (THA)	4:01.75	
	Kasipat Chograthin	58.19	
	Nuttapong Ketin	1:03.88	
	Kornkarnjana Sapianchai	1:01.87	
	Manita Sathianchokwisan	57.81	
—	Singapore (SGP)	DSQ	
	Francis Fong	56.12	
	Lionel Khoo	1:01.24	
	Quah Jing Wen	59.84	
	Quah Ting Wen		
