= Swimming at the 2026 Asian Games – Women's 200 metre breaststroke =

Women's 200 metre breaststroke at the 2026 Asian Games
- Venue: Tokyo Aquatics Centre
- Date: 24 September 2026
- Competitors: 17 from 11 nations

Medalists
gold medal	Kotomi Kato	Japan
silver medal	Park Si-eun	South Korea
bronze medal	Zhu Leiju	China

The women's 200 metre breaststroke event at the 2026 Asian Games took place on 24 September 2026 at the Tokyo Aquatics Centre.

== Schedule ==
All times are Japan Standard Time (UTC+09:00)

Date	Time	Event
Thursday, 24 September 2026	10:18	Heats
Thursday, 24 September 2026	17:11	Final

== Records ==
Prior to this competition, the existing world, Asian and Games records were as follows.

World Record	Yevgeniya Chikunova (RUS)	2:17.55	Kazan, Russia	21 April 2023
Asian Record	Rie Kaneto (JPN)	2:19.65	Tokyo, Japan	4 April 2016
Games Record	Kanako Watanabe (JPN)	2:21.82	Incheon, South Korea	22 September 2014

== Results ==
=== Heats ===
Rank	Heat	Athlete	Time	Notes
1	2	Kotomi Kato (JPN)	2:25.92	Q
2	2	Park Si-eun (KOR)	2:26.57	Q
3	2	Satomi Suzuki (JPN)	2:27.35	Q
4	1	Zhu Leiju (CHN)	2:27.46	Q
5	1	Pimchanok Chinveeraphan (THA)	2:29.12	Q, NR
6	1	Chen Pui Lam (MAC)	2:31.57	Q
7	2	Lynn El Hajj (LBN)	2:32.11	Q
8	1	Gao Jialian Candice (HKG)	2:33.24	Q
9	2	Lam Chelsie (HKG)	2:33.32	Q
10	2	Adellia (INA)	2:33.34	Q
11	1	Lyu Qinyao (CHN)	2:33.66	Reserve
12	1	Mikayla Tan (SGP)	2:34.15	Reserve
13	1	Joy Neo (SGP)	2:36.78	
14	2	Valerie Tarazi (PLE)	2:39.09	
15	2	Alma Shaat (PLE)	2:46.40	
16	1	Maral Batsanal (MGL)	2:52.52	
17	2	Yalguun Ariunsukh (MGL)	2:55.13	

=== Final ===
Rank	Athlete	Time	Notes
1st place, gold medalist(s)	Kotomi Kato (JPN)	2:22.57	
2nd place, silver medalist(s)	Park Si-eun (KOR)	2:22.69	NR
3rd place, bronze medalist(s)	Zhu Leiju (CHN)	2:25.51	
4	Satomi Suzuki (JPN)	2:26.69	
5	Pimchanok Chinveeraphan (THA)	2:28.00	NR
6	Lam Chelsie (HKG)	2:30.50	
7	Lynn El Hajj (LBN)	2:31.33	
8	Chen Pui Lam (MAC)	2:33.70	
9	Gao Jialian Candice (HKG)	2:35.35	
10	Adellia (INA)	2:35.98	
