= Swimming at the 2025 SEA Games – Women's 200 metre backstroke =

Women's 200 metre backstroke at the 2025 SEA Games
- Venue: SAT Swimming Pool
- Date: 15 December
- Competitors: 9 from 5 nations
- Winning time: 2:13.95

Medalists
gold medal	Mia Millar	Thailand
silver medal	Xiandi Chua	Philippines
bronze medal	Adelia Chantika Aulia	Indonesia

The women's 200 metre backstroke event at the 2025 SEA Games took place on 15 December 2025 at the SAT Swimming Pool in Bangkok, Thailand.

== Schedule ==
All times are Indochina Standard Time (UTC+07:00)

Date	Time	Event
Monday, 15 December 2025	9:12	Heats
Monday, 15 December 2025	18:27	Final

== Records ==
Prior to this competition, the existing world, Asian and Games records were as follows.

World Record	Kaylee McKeown (AUS)	2:03.14	Sydney, Australia	10 March 2023
Asian Record	Zhao Jing (CHN)	2:06.46	Guangzhou, China	14 November 2010
Games Record	Xiandi Chua (PHI)	2:13.20	Phnom Penh, Cambodia	8 May 2023

== Results ==
=== Heats ===
Rank	Heat	Lane	Swimmer	Nationality	Time	Notes
1	2	3	Julia Yeo Shu Ning	Singapore	2:19.19	Q
2	2	4	Xiandi Chua	Philippines	2:21.58	Q
3	2	5	Chloe Isleta	Philippines	2:22.24	Q
4	2	6	Victoria Carrie Lim Yiyan	Singapore	2:22.53	Q
5	1	5	Kanistha Tungnapakorn	Thailand	2:22.92	Q
6	2	2	Chong Xin Lin	Malaysia	2:23.41	Q
7	1	4	Mia Millar	Thailand	2:23.46	Q
8	1	3	Adelia Chantika Aulia	Indonesia	2:24.84	Q
9	1	6	Vivian Tee Xin Ling	Malaysia	2:26.98	Q

=== Final ===
Rank	Lane	Swimmer	Nationality	Time	Notes
1st place, gold medalist(s)	1	Mia Millar	Thailand	2:13.95	NR
2nd place, silver medalist(s)	5	Xiandi Chua	Philippines	2:15.73	
3rd place, bronze medalist(s)	8	Adelia Chantika Aulia	Indonesia	2:16.39	
4	4	Julia Yeo Shu Ning	Singapore	2:16.51	NR
5	3	Chloe Isleta	Philippines	2:18.67	
6	2	Kanistha Tungnapakorn	Thailand	2:20.50	
7	6	Victoria Carrie Lim Yiyan	Singapore	2:21.85	
8	0	Vivian Tee Xin Ling	Malaysia	2:22.19	
8	7	Chong Xin Lin	Malaysia	2:23.88	
