= Swimming at the 2026 Asian Games – Women's 100 metre backstroke =

Women's 100 metre backstroke at the 2026 Asian Games
- Venue: Tokyo Aquatics Centre
- Date: 23 September 2026
- Competitors: 29 from 15 nations

Medalists
gold medal	Peng Xuwei	China
silver medal	Rio Shirai	Japan
bronze medal	Kim Seung-won	South Korea

The women's 100 metre backstroke event at the 2026 Asian Games took place on 23 September 2026 at the Tokyo Aquatics Centre.

== Schedule ==
All times are Japan Standard Time (UTC+09:00)

Date	Time	Event
Wednesday, 23 September 2026	10:21	Heats
Wednesday, 23 September 2026	17:16	Final

== Records ==
Prior to this competition, the existing world, Asian and Games records were as follows.

World Record	Regan Smith (USA)	57.13	Indianapolis, United States	18 June 2026
Asian Record	Aya Terakawa (JPN)	58.70	Barcelona, Spain	4 August 2013
Games Record	Zhao Jing (CHN)	58.94	Guangzhou, China	13 November 2010

== Results ==
=== Heats ===
Rank	Heat	Athlete	Time	Notes
1	2	Peng Xuwei (CHN)	59.86	Q
2	2	Rio Shirai (JPN)	1:00.24	Q
3	3	Kim Seung-won (KOR)	1:00.37	Q
4	2	Lee Eun-ji (KOR)	1:00.86	Q
5	3	Xeniya Ignatova (KAZ)	1:01.12	Q
=6	3	Li Wanwei (CHN)	1:01.31	Q
=6	1	Miri Sasaki (JPN)	1:01.31	Q
8	1	Cheung Sum Yuet (HKG)	1:01.37	Q
9	2	Flairene Candrea (INA)	1:02.48	Q
10	3	Chang Ya-jia (TPE)	1:02.53	Q
11	2	Levenia Entong Sim (SGP)	1:02.85	Reserve
12	1	Chan Tsz Yu Ashley (HKG)	1:03.05	Reserve
13	2	Mia Millar (THA)	1:03.51	
14	3	Adelia Chantika Aulia (INA)	1:03.59	
15	1	Julia Shu Ning Yeo (SGP)	1:03.89	
16	1	Wong Un Lao (MAC)	1:04.94	
17	2	Valerie Tarazi (PLE)	1:05.31	
18	2	Parizod Abdukarimova (UZB)	1:05.34	
19	3	Ariuntamir Enkh-amgalan (MGL)	1:05.45	
20	3	Amani Alobaidli (BRN)	1:06.52	
21	1	Yalindi Minagi Rupesinghe (SRI)	1:06.53	
22	1	Chan Mei Yan (MAC)	1:06.59	
23	2	Farah Fares (PLE)	1:08.52	
24	1	Noor Taha (BRN)	1:11.07	
25	3	Sodonchimeg Sodovjamts (MGL)	1:16.35	
26	2	Farrah Alsabih (KUW)	1:17.55	
27	3	Malaika Linda Imran (MDV)	1:20.57	
	3	Kayla Sanchez (PHI)	DNS	
	1	Teia Salvino (PHI)	DNS	

=== Final ===
Rank	Athlete	Time	Notes
1st place, gold medalist(s)	Peng Xuwei (CHN)	59.30	
2nd place, silver medalist(s)	Rio Shirai (JPN)	59.89	
3rd place, bronze medalist(s)	Kim Seung-won (KOR)	1:00.10	
4	Li Wanwei (CHN)	1:00.20	
5	Lee Eun-ji (KOR)	1:00.51	
6	Xeniya Ignatova (KAZ)	1:01.12	
7	Miri Sasaki (JPN)	1:01.22	
8	Cheung Sum Yuet (HKG)	1:01.52	
9	Chang Ya-jia (TPE)	1:01.72	
10	Flairene Candrea (INA)	1:02.60	
