= Swimming at the 2022 Asian Games – Women's 4 × 200 metre freestyle relay =

Women's 4 × 200 metre freestyle relay at the 2022 Asian Games
- Venue: Hangzhou Olympic Expo Aquatics Center
- Date: 28 September 2023
- Competitors: 52 from 10 nations

Medalists
gold medal	China; Liu Yaxin, Cheng Yujie, Li Bingjie, Li Jiaping, Wu Qingfeng, Ge Chutong, Yang Peiqi
silver medal	Japan; Rio Shirai, Nagisa Ikemoto, Waka Kobori, Miyu Namba, Mio Narita, Hiroko Makino
bronze medal	South Korea; Kim Seo-yeong, Hur Yeon-kyung, Park Su-jin, Han Da-kyung, Lee Eun-ji, Jeong So-eun

The women's 4 × 200 metre freestyle relay event at the 2022 Asian Games took place on 28 September 2023 at the Hangzhou Olympic Expo Center.

== Schedule ==
All times are China Standard Time (UTC+08:00)

Date	Time	Event
Thursday, 28 September 2023	11:35	Heats
Thursday, 28 September 2023	21:06	Final

== Records ==
Prior to this competition, the existing world, Asian and Games records were as follows.

World Record	Australia	7:37.50	Fukuoka, Japan	27 July 2023
Asian Record	China	7:40.33	Tokyo, Japan	29 July 2021
Games Record	China	7:48.61	Jakarta, Indonesia	21 August 2018

== Results ==
=== Heats ===
Rank	Heat	Team	Time	Notes
1	2	China (CHN)	8:01.02	
		Wu Qingfeng	2:03.35	
		Ge Chutong	1:59.86	
		Yang Peiqi	1:59.57	
		Li Jiaping	1:58.24	
2	1	Japan (JPN)	8:04.37	
		Waka Kobori	1:59.48	
		Mio Narita	2:02.52	
		Miyu Namba	2:01.43	
		Hiroko Makino	2:00.94	
3	2	Hong Kong (HKG)	8:18.94	
		Tinky Ho	2:04.00	
		Chloe Cheng	2:02.61	
		Ng Lai Wa	2:06.75	
		Mok Sze Ki	2:05.58	
4	1	South Korea (KOR)	8:24.93	
		Lee Eun-ji	2:07.66	
		Park Su-jin	2:06.20	
		Jeong So-eun	2:08.36	
		Hur Yeon-kyung	2:02.71	
5	2	Singapore (SGP)	8:29.20	
		Chan Zi Yi	2:03.53	
		Ashley Lim	2:07.32	
		Marina Chan	2:09.82	
		Faith Khoo	2:08.53	
6	2	Philippines (PHI)	8:30.42	
		Chloe Isleta	2:05.43	
		Xiandi Chua	2:11.16	
		Teia Salvino	2:06.77	
		Jasmine Al-Khaldi	2:07.06	
7	1	Thailand (THA)	8:31.02	
		Kamonchanok Kwanmuang	2:01.61	
		Napatsawan Jaritkla	2:10.62	
		Kornkarnjana Sapianchai	2:10.98	
		Jinjutha Pholjamjumrus	2:07.81	
8	1	India (IND)	8:39.64	
		Dhinidhi Desinghu	2:07.74	
		Shivangi Sarma	2:12.24	
		Vritti Agarwal	2:10.20	
		Hashika Ramachandra	2:09.46	
9	2	Macau (MAC)	9:12.05	
		Chen Pui Lam	2:15.86	
		Cheang Weng Chi	2:18.84	
		Kuan I Cheng	2:20.15	
		Kuok Hei Cheng	2:17.20	
10	1	Maldives (MDV)	10:50.31	
		Hamna Ahmed	2:41.66	
		Hanan Hussain Haleem	2:41.23	
		Een Abbas Shareef	2:44.51	
		Meral Ayn Latheef	2:42.91	

=== Final ===
Rank	Team	Time	Notes
1st place, gold medalist(s)	China (CHN)	7:49.34	
	Liu Yaxin	1:56.45	
	Cheng Yujie	1:58.56	
	Li Bingjie	1:56.14	
	Li Jiaping	1:58.19	
2nd place, silver medalist(s)	Japan (JPN)	7:55.93	
	Rio Shirai	1:59.28	
	Nagisa Ikemoto	1:57.73	
	Waka Kobori	1:59.00	
	Miyu Namba	1:59.92	
3rd place, bronze medalist(s)	South Korea (KOR)	8:00.11	
	Kim Seo-yeong	1:59.43	
	Hur Yeon-kyung	1:58.64	
	Park Su-jin	2:01.32	
	Han Da-kyung	2:00.72	
4	Hong Kong (HKG)	8:02.42	
	Chloe Cheng	2:03.19	
	Siobhán Haughey	1:54.21	
	Camille Cheng	2:02.46	
	Stephanie Au	2:02.56	
5	Philippines (PHI)	8:12.80	
	Teia Salvino	2:04.75	
	Kayla Sanchez	2:00.05	
	Xiandi Chua	2:03.67	
	Chloe Isleta	2:04.33	
6	Thailand (THA)	8:22.73	
	Kamonchanok Kwanmuang	2:01.37	
	Napatsawan Jaritkla	2:07.18	
	Kornkarnjana Sapianchai	2:09.48	
	Jinjutha Pholjamjumrus	2:04.70	
7	Singapore (SGP)	8:29.08	
	Chan Zi Yi	2:03.99	
	Ashley Lim	2:07.64	
	Faith Khoo	2:10.56	
	Christie Chue	2:06.89	
8	India (IND)	8:37.58	
	Dhinidhi Desinghu	2:08.59	
	Vritti Agarwal	2:09.41	
	Shivangi Sarma	2:11.32	
	Hashika Ramachandra	2:08.26	
