= Si-eun =

- Hangul: 시은
- RR: Sieun
- MR: Siŭn
- IPA: [ɕiɯn]

Sieun is a Korean given name.

== People ==
People with this name include:

- Park, Sieun (born Park Eun-young, 1980), South Korean actress
- Kim, Sieun (born 1999), South Korean actress
- Kim, Sieun (born 2000), South Korean actress
- Park, Sieun (born 2001), South Korean actress and singer, member of STAYC

== Fictional characters ==
Fictional characters with this name include:

- Sieun Yeon, male character in the 2022 South Korean Web Drama Weak Hero Class 1
- Sieun, female character in the 2022 South Korean Web Drama Work Later, Drink Now 2
- Sieun Oh, female character in 2020 South Korean television series Touch
- Sieun Lee, female character in 2018 South Korean television series A Poem a Day
- Sieun Kim, female character in 2018 South Korean television series Just Dance
- Sieun, female character in 2018 South Korean film Back from the Beat
- Jang Shi-eun, female character in 2015 South Korean television series Super Daddy Yeol
- Sieun, female character in 2015 South Korean film Fatal Intuition
- Sieun Kim, female character in 2006 South Korean film Lump Sugar

== See also ==
- List of Korean given names
