= Park Su-jin =

South Korean swimmer (born 1999)

Personal information
- Nationality: South Korean
- Born: 4 June 1999 (age 27)

Sport
- Sport: Swimming
Medal record
Asian Games
Silver medal – second place	2022 Hangzhou	4×100 m medley relay
Bronze medal – third place	2022 Hangzhou	4×200 m freestyle

Korean name
- Hangul: 박수진
- RR: Bak Sujin
- MR: Pak Sujin

Park Su-jin (born 4 June 1999) is a South Korean swimmer. She competed in the women's 200 metre butterfly at the 2019 World Aquatics Championships.
