= Swimming at the 2022 Asian Games – Women's 4 × 100 metre medley relay =

Women's 4 × 100 metre medley relay at the 2022 Asian Games
- Venue: Hangzhou Olympic Expo Aquatics Center
- Date: 29 September 2023
- Competitors: 61 from 13 nations

Medalists
gold medal	Japan; Miki Takahashi, Reona Aoki, Ai Soma, Nagisa Ikemoto, Hiroko Makino
silver medal	South Korea; Lee Eun-ji, Ko Ha-ru, Kim Seo-yeong, Hur Yeon-kyung, Kim Hye-jin, Park Su-jin, Jeong So-eun
bronze medal	Hong Kong; Stephanie Au, Siobhán Haughey, Natalie Kan, Tam Hoi Lam, Cindy Cheung, Lam Hoi Kiu, Yeung Hoi Ching, Camille Cheng

The women's 4 × 100 metre medley relay event at the 2022 Asian Games took place on 29 September 2023 at the Hangzhou Olympic Expo Center.

== Schedule ==
All times are China Standard Time (UTC+08:00)

Date	Time	Event
Friday, 29 September 2023	11:43	Heats
Friday, 29 September 2023	21:04	Final

== Records ==
Prior to this competition, the existing world, Asian and Games records were as follows.

World Record	United States	3:50.40	Gwangju, South Korea	28 July 2019
Asian Record	China	3:52.19	Rome, Italy	1 August 2009
Games Record	Japan	3:54.73	Jakarta, Indonesia	23 August 2018

== Results ==
Legend

- DSQ — Disqualified

=== Heats ===
Rank	Heat	Team	Time	Notes
1	2	Japan (JPN)	4:02.33	
		Miki Takahashi	1:00.98	
		Reona Aoki	1:07.50	
		Hiroko Makino	58.55	
		Nagisa Ikemoto	55.30	
2	2	South Korea (KOR)	4:06.47	
		Lee Eun-ji	1:01.65	
		Kim Hye-jin	1:08.67	
		Park Su-jin	59.17	
		Jeong So-eun	56.98	
3	1	Singapore (SGP)	4:07.12	
		Levenia Sim	1:01.75	
		Letitia Sim	1:08.53	
		Quah Jing Wen	59.86	
		Amanda Lim	56.98	
4	1	Hong Kong (HKG)	4:08.34	
		Cindy Cheung	1:01.90	
		Lam Hoi Kiu	1:10.25	
		Yeung Hoi Ching	1:00.08	
		Camille Cheng	56.11	
5	1	Philippines (PHI)	4:10.80	
		Teia Salvino	1:02.54	
		Thanya Dela Cruz	1:11.82	
		Jasmine Al-Khaldi	1:01.47	
		Kayla Sanchez	54.97	
6	1	Kazakhstan (KAZ)	4:11.93	
		Xeniya Ignatova	1:01.81	
		Adelaida Pchelintseva	1:12.53	
		Sofia Spodarenko	1:00.06	
		Diana Taszhanova	57.53	
7	2	Chinese Taipei (TPE)	4:14.43	
		Wu Yi-en	1:04.52	
		Lin Pei-wun	1:10.32	
		Hsu An	1:01.69	
		Huang Mei-chien	57.90	
8	2	Thailand (THA)	4:18.54	
		Mia Millar	1:05.50	
		Phurichaya Junyamitree	1:12.42	
		Napatsawan Jaritkla	1:02.42	
		Kamonchanok Kwanmuang	58.20	
9	1	India (IND)	4:23.46	
		Maana Patel	1:04.81	
		Lineysha A. K.	1:16.46	
		Nina Venkatesh	1:03.63	
		Shivangi Sarma	58.56	
10	2	Macau (MAC)	4:25.70	
		Cheang Weng Lam	1:08.58	
		Chen Pui Lam	1:11.92	
		Cheang Weng Chi	1:05.96	
		Kuok Hei Cheng	59.96	
11	2	Mongolia (MGL)	4:39.08	
		Enkh-Amgalangiin Ariuntamir	1:09.12	
		Batnasangiin Maral	1:22.81	
		Ganbaataryn Nomuunaa	1:10.19	
		Batbayaryn Enkhkhüslen	56.96	
12	1	Maldives (MDV)	5:22.80	
		Hamna Ahmed	1:21.95	
		Een Abbas Shareef	1:33.92	
		Meral Ayn Latheef	1:16.28	
		Hanan Hussain Haleem	1:10.65	
—	2	China (CHN)	DSQ	
		Wang Xueer		
		Zhu Leiju		
		Wang Yichun		
		Cheng Yujie		

=== Final ===
Rank	Team	Time	Notes
1st place, gold medalist(s)	Japan (JPN)	3:57.67	
	Miki Takahashi	1:00.80	
	Reona Aoki	1:06.21	
	Ai Soma	57.28	
	Nagisa Ikemoto	53.38	
2nd place, silver medalist(s)	South Korea (KOR)	4:00.13	
	Lee Eun-ji	1:00.68	
	Ko Ha-ru	1:08.42	
	Kim Seo-yeong	57.41	
	Hur Yeon-kyung	53.62	
3rd place, bronze medalist(s)	Hong Kong (HKG)	4:01.72	
	Stephanie Au	1:00.74	
	Siobhán Haughey	1:06.03	
	Natalie Kan	59.89	
	Tam Hoi Lam	55.06	
4	Philippines (PHI)	4:10.61	
	Teia Salvino	1:02.68	
	Thanya Dela Cruz	1:11.17	
	Jasmine Al-Khaldi	1:02.07	
	Kayla Sanchez	54.69	
5	Kazakhstan (KAZ)	4:11.15	
	Xeniya Ignatova	1:02.22	
	Adelaida Pchelintseva	1:10.92	
	Sofia Spodarenko	59.63	
	Diana Taszhanova	58.38	
6	Chinese Taipei (TPE)	4:11.25	
	Wu Yi-en	1:03.93	
	Lin Pei-wun	1:09.31	
	Hsu An	1:01.09	
	Huang Mei-chien	56.92	
7	Thailand (THA)	4:14.99	
	Mia Millar	1:05.00	
	Phurichaya Junyamitree	1:11.44	
	Napatsawan Jaritkla	1:01.39	
	Kamonchanok Kwanmuang	57.16	
—	Singapore (SGP)	DSQ	
	Levenia Sim	1:01.80	
	Letitia Sim	1:05.86	
	Quah Jing Wen	58.78	
	Quah Ting Wen		
