= Jeong So-eun =

South Korean swimmer (born 1996)

Personal information
- Born: 5 April 1996 (age 30)

Sport
- Sport: Swimming
Medal record
Women's swimming
Representing South Korea
Asian Games
Silver medal – second place	2022 Hangzhou	4×100 m medley relay
Bronze medal – third place	2022 Hangzhou	4×200 m freestyle
Summer Universiade
Bronze medal – third place	2019 Naples	50 m butterfly

Jeong So-eun (born 5 April 1996) is a South Korean swimmer.

She represented South Korea at the 2019 Summer Universiade held in Naples, Italy. She won the bronze medal in the women's 50 metres butterfly event.

In 2019, she also represented South Korea at the World Aquatics Championships held in Gwangju, South Korea. She competed in the women's 50 metre freestyle and women's 100 metre freestyle events. In both events she did not advance to compete in the semi-finals. She also competed in two women's relay events and two mixed relay events, without winning a medal.
