= Kim Seung-won =

South Korean swimmer (born 2010)

Personal information
- Nationality: South Korean
- Born: January 1, 2010 (age 16) South Korea

Korean name
- Hangul: 김승원
- RR: Gim Seungwon
- MR: Kim Sŭngwŏn

Sport
- Sport: Swimming
- Strokes: Backstroke
Medal record
Asian Games
Bronze medal – third place	2026 Aichi–Nagoya	50 m backstroke
Bronze medal – third place	2026 Aichi–Nagoya	100 m backstroke
Bronze medal – third place	2026 Aichi–Nagoya	4×100 m medley
Bronze medal – third place	2026 Aichi–Nagoya	4×100 m mixed medley
Youth Olympic Games
Silver medal – second place	2026 Dakar	50 m backstroke
Silver medal – second place	2026 Dakar	100 m backstroke
World Junior Championships
Bronze medal – third place	2025 Otopeni	100 m backstroke

Kim Seung-won (Korean: 김승원; born 1 January 2010) is a South Korean swimmer who specializes in backstroke. She competed in the 2026 Asian Games, where she won four bronze medals, and 2026 Summer Youth Olympics, where she won two silver medals.

== Early life ==
Kim Seung-won was born on January 1, 2010. In 2018, while attending a water safety lesson, she was encouraged by a teacher to take up swimming. As of 2026, she was attending Gyeonggi Physical Education High School.

== Swimming career ==
Kim was first called up to the South Korea national team in 2023. In February 2024, Kim competed at the 2024 World Aquatics Championships in Doha, Qatar, where she competed in the women's 50 metre and 200 metre backstroke. In December 2024, she also competed at the World Aquatics Swimming Championships (25 m) in Budapest, Hungary.

From July to August 2025, Kim competed at the World Aquatics Championships in Singapore, where she reached the semifinals in the 100 metre and 50 metre backstroke. In August 2025, she competed at the World Aquatics Junior Swimming Championships in Otopeni, where she won the silver medal in the 50 m backstroke.

In September 2026, at the Asian Games held in Tokyo, Japan, Kim won the bronze medal in the 50 m and 100 m backstroke. She also won the bronze medal in the mixed and women's 4 × 100 metre medley relay.

In November 2026, Kim competed at the Summer Youth Olympics in Dakar, Senegal and won the silver medal in the 100 m and 50 m backstroke.
