= Nagisa Ikemoto =

Japanese swimmer (born 2002)

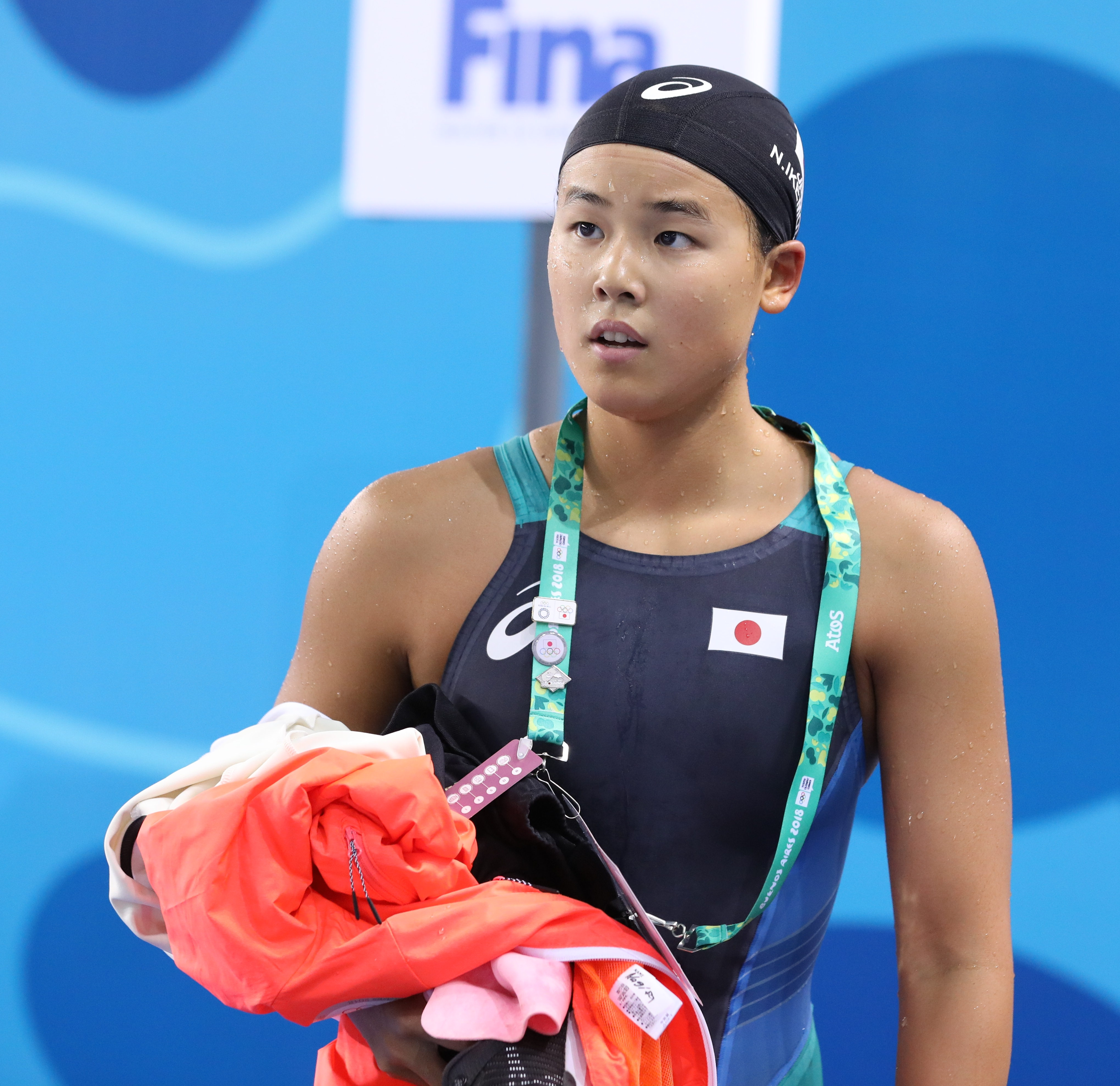
- Ikemoto in 2018

Personal information
- Nationality: Japanese
- Born: 25 August 2002 (age 24)

Sport
- Sport: Swimming
Medal record
Women's swimming
Representing Japan
Asian Games
Gold medal – first place	2022 Hangzhou	4x100 m medley
Silver medal – second place	2022 Hangzhou	4x100 m freestyle
Silver medal – second place	2022 Hangzhou	4x200 m freestyle
Silver medal – second place	2022 Hangzhou	4x100 m mixed medley
Silver medal – second place	2026 Aichi–Nagoya	4×100 m medley
Silver medal – second place	2026 Aichi–Nagoya	4×100 m mixed medley
Bronze medal – third place	2026 Aichi–Nagoya	4×100 m freestyle
Youth Olympic Games
Bronze medal – third place	2018 Buenos Aires	4×100 m freestyle
Bronze medal – third place	2018 Buenos Aires	4×100 m mixed medley
Junior Pan Pacific Championships
Bronze medal – third place	2018 Suva	200 m freestyle
Bronze medal – third place	2018 Suva	4×200 m freestyle
Bronze medal – third place	2018 Suva	4×100 m medley
Bronze medal – third place	2018 Suva	4×100 m mixed medley

Nagisa Ikemoto (池本凪沙, Ikemoto Nagisa, born 25 August 2002) is a Japanese swimmer. She competed in the women's 4 × 200 metre freestyle relay at the 2020 Summer Olympics.

At the 2018 Junior Pan Pacific Swimming Championships, held in Suva, Fiji, Ikemoto won four bronze medals, one each in the 200 metre freestyle, 4×200 metre freestyle relay, 4×100 metre medley relay, 4×100 metre mixed medley relay.
