= Rikako Ikee =

Japanese swimmer (born 2000)

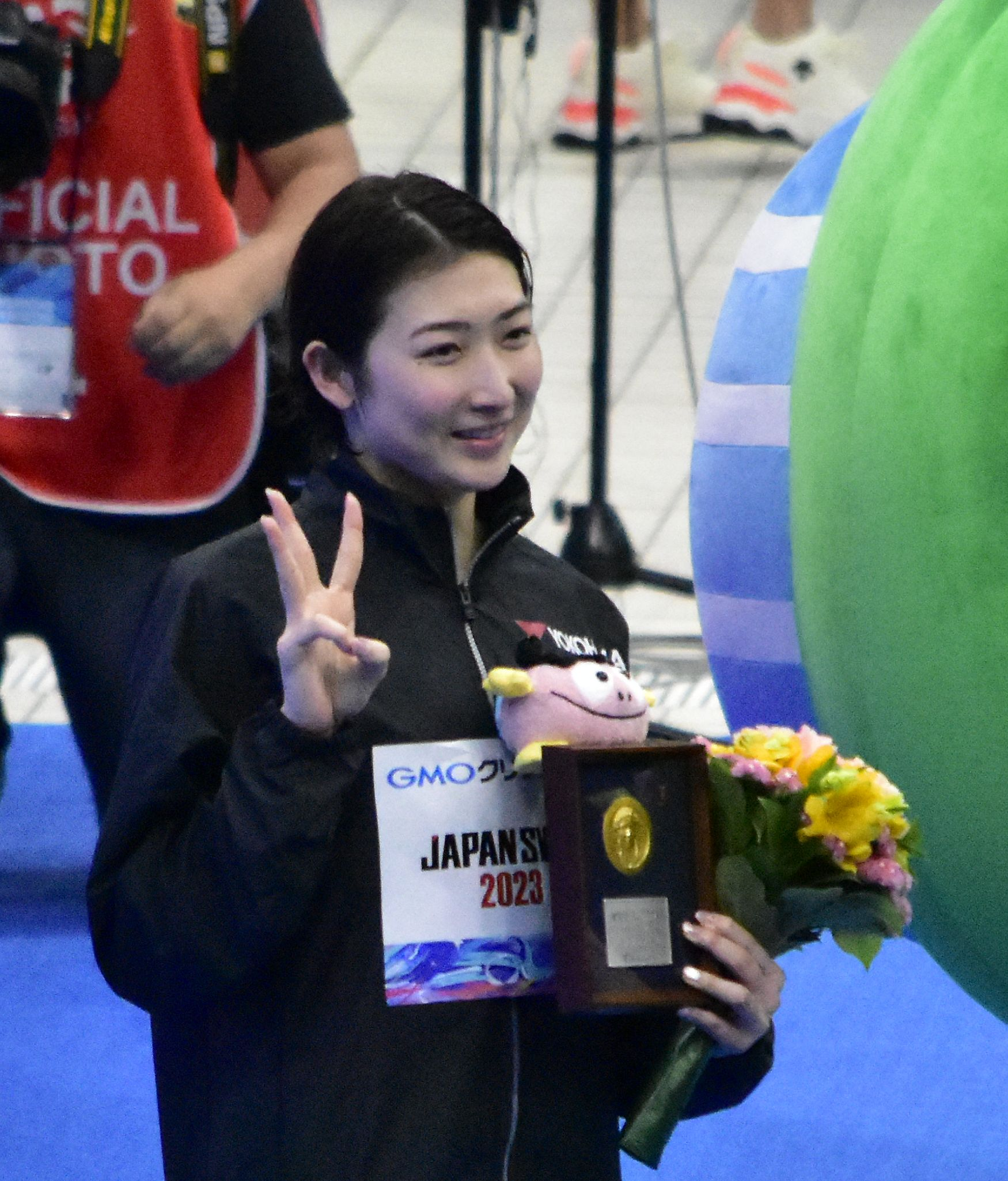

Personal information
- National team: Japan
- Born: 4 July 2000 (age 26) Tokyo, Japan
- Height: 171 cm (5 ft 7 in)
- Weight: 57 kg (126 lb)

Sport
- Sport: Swimming
- Strokes: Butterfly, freestyle
Medal record
Women's swimming
Representing Japan
Event	1st	2nd	3rd
World Championships (SC)	0	0	3
Pan Pacific Championships	1	2	1
Asian Games	6	5	2
Asian Championships	4	3	0
World Junior Championships	5	2	4
Total	16	12	10
World Championships (SC)
Bronze medal – third place	2016 Windsor	50 m butterfly
Bronze medal – third place	2016 Windsor	100 m butterfly
Bronze medal – third place	2016 Windsor	4×50 m mixed medley
Pan Pacific Championships
Gold medal – first place	2018 Tokyo	100 m butterfly
Silver medal – second place	2018 Tokyo	200 m freestyle
Silver medal – second place	2018 Tokyo	4×100 m mixed medley
Bronze medal – third place	2018 Tokyo	4×100 m medley
Asian Games
Gold medal – first place	2018 Jakarta-Palembang	50 m freestyle
Gold medal – first place	2018 Jakarta-Palembang	100 m freestyle
Gold medal – first place	2018 Jakarta-Palembang	50 m butterfly
Gold medal – first place	2018 Jakarta-Palembang	100 m butterfly
Gold medal – first place	2018 Jakarta-Palembang	4×100 m freestyle
Gold medal – first place	2018 Jakarta-Palembang	4×100 m medley
Silver medal – second place	2018 Jakarta-Palembang	4×200 m freestyle
Silver medal – second place	2018 Jakarta-Palembang	4×100 m mixed medley
Silver medal – second place	2022 Hangzhou	4×100 m freestyle
Silver medal – second place	2026 Aichi–Nagoya	4×100 m medley
Silver medal – second place	2026 Aichi–Nagoya	4×100 m mixed medley
Bronze medal – third place	2022 Hangzhou	50 m butterfly
Bronze medal – third place	2026 Aichi–Nagoya	50 m butterfly
Asian Championships
Gold medal – first place	2016 Tokyo	50 m freestyle
Gold medal – first place	2016 Tokyo	50 m butterfly
Gold medal – first place	2016 Tokyo	100 m butterfly
Gold medal – first place	2016 Tokyo	4×100 m medley
Silver medal – second place	2016 Tokyo	100 m freestyle
Silver medal – second place	2016 Tokyo	4×100 m freestyle
Silver medal – second place	2016 Tokyo	4×200 m freestyle
World Junior Championships
Gold medal – first place	2015 Singapore	50 m butterfly
Gold medal – first place	2015 Singapore	100 m butterfly
Gold medal – first place	2017 Indianapolis	50 m freestyle
Gold medal – first place	2017 Indianapolis	50 m butterfly
Gold medal – first place	2017 Indianapolis	100 m butterfly
Silver medal – second place	2015 Singapore	50 m freestyle
Silver medal – second place	2017 Indianapolis	100 m freestyle
Bronze medal – third place	2015 Singapore	4×100 m medley
Bronze medal – third place	2017 Indianapolis	4×100 m freestyle
Bronze medal – third place	2017 Indianapolis	4×200 m freestyle
Bronze medal – third place	2017 Indianapolis	4×100 m medley
Junior Pan Pacific Championships
Silver medal – second place	2014 Maui	4×100 m medley
Bronze medal – third place	2014 Maui	100 m butterfly
Bronze medal – third place	2014 Maui	4×100 m freestyle
Bronze medal – third place	2014 Maui	4×200 m freestyle

Rikako Ikee (池江璃花子, Ikee Rikako; /ˈriːkəkoʊ ɪˈkeɪ/, Japanese: [ikee ɾiꜜkako]; born 4 July 2000) is a Japanese competitive swimmer. She is the national record holder in the 50-meter freestyle and the 100-meter butterfly, and the junior world record holder in the 50-meter freestyle and 50-meter butterfly long-course events, and the 50- and 100-meter butterfly, and 100-meter individual medley in short course.

At the 2018 Asian Games, Ikee won six gold and two silver medals, also becoming the first female athlete to win the Most Valuable Player award at the Asian Games.

== 2014 ==
At 14 years of age competing at the 2014 Junior Pan Pacific Swimming Championships held in August with pool swimming contested at Kihei Aquatic Center in Hawaii, United States, Ikee won the bronze medal in the 100 metre butterfly, a silver medal in the 4×100 metre medley relay, and bronze medals in the 4×100 metre freestyle relay and the 4×200 metre freestyle relay.

== 2015 ==
Ikee won the gold medals in the 50 and 100 meter butterfly events at the 2015 FINA World Junior Swimming Championships in Singapore, breaking the Championships record in each. She also won the silver medal in the 50 meter freestyle and finished 4th in the 100 meter freestyle.

Ikee swam at the 2015 World Aquatics Championships. She finished 19th in the 50 meter butterfly and missed qualification for the semifinals by 0.17 s. In the 4 × 200 meter freestyle relay Ikee and her teammates reached the final where they finished in 7th place.

At the 2015 World Cup leg in Tokyo, Ikee broke the senior Japanese record in the 100-meter butterfly with a time of 57.56, and the junior world record in the 50-meter butterfly in 26.17 (both long course). She won the gold medal in both events, as well as in the 100-meter freestyle.

== 2016 ==
At the Kitajima Cup in Tokyo in January 2016, Ikee broke the national record in the 100-meter freestyle, swimming 53.99. This record was broken in April by Miki Uchida. In February, she broke the national record in the 50-meter freestyle with a time of 24.74 at the Konami Open held at the Tokyo Tatsumi International Swimming Center. This also broke the world junior record.

=== 2016 Summer Olympics ===
At the Olympic trials in Tokyo in April, Ikee slightly improved her national record in the 100 m butterfly to 57.55. Ikee qualified to swim in four individual events (50 m freestyle, 100 m freestyle, 200 m freestyle, and 100 m butterfly) and three relay events (4 × 100 m freestyle relay, 4 × 200 m freestyle relay, and 4 × 100 m medley relay) at the 2016 Summer Olympics in Rio de Janeiro.

In the heats of the 100 m butterfly, she broke her national record with a time of 57.27. In the semifinals she further improved this to 57.05, and in the final again, finishing 6th in 56.86. She finished 21st in the 200 m freestyle.

== 2018 ==
=== 2018 Asian Games ===
At the 2018 Asian Games in Indonesia, Ikee became the first swimmer to win six gold medals at a single Asian Games. She also won two silvers. After returning to Japan, Ikee learned that she had won the Most Valuable Player award for the tournament, the first for a female athlete at the Games. She then returned to Indonesia to collect the trophy and prize money.

== 2019 ==
=== Leukemia ===
Ikee felt ill during a three-week training camp in Australia early February, and left early to return to Japan to be examined by medical staff. On 12 February, Ikee posted a message on Twitter, announcing that she has been diagnosed with leukemia.

== 2021 ==
=== Tokyo Olympics qualifier ===
Two years after her leukemia diagnosis, Ikee qualified for the 4x100 medley relay in the 2020 Summer Olympics in Tokyo by winning the 100-meter butterfly event in the Japanese Olympic trials with a time of 57.77 seconds. She helped the team reach the finals of the 4x100 medley relay.
