= Chiho Mizuguchi =

Japanese swimmer (born 2001)

Personal information
- Nationality: Japanese
- Born: 30 August 2001 (age 25)
- Education: Meiji University
- Employer: All Nippon Airways

Sport
- Sport: Swimming
- Strokes: Butterfly
- Club: Tokyo Dome Sports
Medal record
Women's swimming
Representing Japan
Asian Games
Silver medal – second place	2026 Aichi–Nagoya	4×100 m medley
Silver medal – second place	2026 Aichi–Nagoya	4×100 m mixed medley

Chiho Mizuguchi (Japanese: 水口知保; born 30 August 2001) is a Japanese competitive swimmer who specialises in butterfly events. She is affiliated with Tokyo Dome Sports and All Nippon Airways. She represented Japan at the 2026 Asian Games, winning silver medals in the women's and mixed 4 × 100 metre medley relays.

== Career ==
Mizuguchi studied at Meiji University, graduating in 2024 with a degree in business administration. She competed in university swimming competitions and represented the university in butterfly and freestyle events.

Mizuguchi recorded personal bests of 27.03 seconds in the women's 50 metre butterfly and 58.53 seconds in the 100 metre butterfly at the 2024 Japan Olympic swimming trials. Her personal best in the 200 metre butterfly is 2:07.61, recorded at the 2026 Japan Swimming Championships.

In March 2026, Mizuguchi won the women's 200 metre butterfly at the 101st Japan Swimming Championships, which also served as a selection competition for the Asian Games and the Pan Pacific Swimming Championships. She won the final in 2:07.61 and secured selection for Japan's Asian Games swimming team.

At the 2026 Asian Games in Aichi and Nagoya, Mizuguchi competed in the women's 50 metre and 200 metre butterfly events. She finished ninth in the 50 metre butterfly and fifth in the 200 metre butterfly, recording a time of 2:10.20 in the latter final. Mizuguchi also competed in the women's 4 × 100 metre medley relay and the mixed 4 × 100 metre medley relay. The Japanese teams won silver medals in both events. Her performances contributed to Japan's medal tally in swimming at the Games.
