= Satomi Suzuki =

Japanese swimmer (born 1991)

Personal information
- Born: 29 January 1991 (age 35) Onga, Fukuoka, Japan
- Height: 168 cm (5 ft 6 in)
- Weight: 137 lb (62 kg)

Sport
- Sport: Swimming
- Strokes: Breaststroke
Medal record
Representing Japan
Olympic Games
Silver medal – second place	2012 London	200 m breaststroke
Bronze medal – third place	2012 London	100 m breaststroke
Bronze medal – third place	2012 London	4×100 m medley
Pan Pacific Championships
Bronze medal – third place	2010 Irvine	4×100 m medley
Bronze medal – third place	2018 Tokyo	200 m breaststroke
Bronze medal – third place	2026 Irvine	100 m breaststroke
Asian Games
Gold medal – first place	2014 Incheon	50 m breaststroke
Gold medal – first place	2018 Jakarta	50 m breaststroke
Gold medal – first place	2018 Jakarta	100 m breaststroke
Gold medal – first place	2018 Jakarta	4×100 m medley
Silver medal – second place	2010 Guangzhou	100 m breaststroke
Silver medal – second place	2010 Guangzhou	4×100 m medley
Silver medal – second place	2022 Hangzhou	50 m breaststroke
Silver medal – second place	2022 Hangzhou	100 m breaststroke
Silver medal – second place	2026 Aichi–Nagoya	50 m breaststroke
Silver medal – second place	2026 Aichi–Nagoya	100 m breaststroke
Silver medal – second place	2026 Aichi–Nagoya	4×100 m medley
Bronze medal – third place	2010 Guangzhou	50 m breaststroke
World University Games
Bronze medal – third place	2011 Shenzhen	100 m breaststroke
Bronze medal – third place	2011 Shenzhen	200 m breaststroke
Bronze medal – third place	2011 Shenzhen	4×100 m medley

Satomi Suzuki (鈴木聡美, Suzuki Satomi; born 29 January 1991 in Onga, Fukuoka) is a Japanese swimmer. At the 2012 Summer Olympics, she won a silver medal in the 200m breaststroke event and bronze medals in the 100m breaststroke and 4×100m medley relay. She also swam in the 100 m breaststroke and 4 x 100 m medley relay at the 2016 Summer Olympics. She currently belongs to Miki House.
