= Kim Hye-jin (swimmer) =

South Korean swimmer (born 1994)

Kim Hye-Jin
Personal information
- Nationality: South Korea
- Born: 3 May 1994 (age 32) Chungcheongnam-do, South Korea
- Height: 1.67 m (5 ft 5 1/2 in)
- Weight: 62 kg (137 lb)

Korean name
- Hangul: 김혜진
- RR: Gim Hyejin
- MR: Kim Hyejin

Sport
- Sport: Swimming
- Strokes: Breaststroke
Medal record
Asian Games
Silver medal – second place	2022 Hangzhou	4×100 m medley relay

Kim Hye-Jin (born May 3, 1994, in Chungcheongnam-do) is a South Korean swimmer, who specialized in breaststroke events. Kim qualified for the women's 100 m breaststroke at the 2012 Summer Olympics in London, by eclipsing a FINA B-standard entry time of 1:08.80 from the Dong-A Swimming Tournament in Ulsan. She challenged seven other swimmers on the third heat, including three-time Olympian Alia Atkinson of Jamaica. Kim raced to seventh place by 0.36 of a second behind Turkey's Dilara Buse Günaydın, outside her entry time of 1:09.79. Kim failed to advance into the semifinals, as she placed thirty-third overall in the preliminary heats.
