= An Se-hyeon =

South Korean swimmer (born 1995)

Personal information
- Nationality: South Korean
- Born: October 14, 1995 (age 30) Ulsan, South Korea

Sport
- Sport: Swimming
- Events: Butterfly; Freestyle relay
Medal record
Women's swimming
Representing South Korea
Asian Games
Silver medal – second place	2014 Incheon	4×100 m medley
Bronze medal – third place	2018 Jakarta	100 m butterfly
Bronze medal – third place	2018 Jakarta	4×100 m mixed medley
Bronze medal – third place	2026 Aichi–Nagoya	4×100 m medley
Bronze medal – third place	2026 Aichi–Nagoya	4×100 m mixed medley

Korean name
- Hangul: 안세현
- RR: An Sehyeon
- MR: An Sehyŏn

An Se-hyeon (Korean: 안세현; born October 14, 1995) is a South Korean swimmer.

She competed at the 2015 World Aquatics Championships, 2016 Summer Olympics in Rio de Janeiro and 2020 Summer Olympics in Tokyo.

== Career ==
In July 2021, she represented South Korea at the 2020 Summer Olympics held in Tokyo, Japan. She competed in the women's 100 metre butterfly and 4 × 200 metre freestyle relay events. In freestyle event, she did not advance to compete in the semifinal. In the freestyle relay event, the team did not advance to compete in the final.
