= Park Si-eun =

- Hangul: 박시은
- RR: Bak Sieun
- MR: Pak Siŭn
- IPA: [pakɕ͈iɯn]

Park Si-eun (Korean: 박시은) is a Korean name consisting of the surname Park and the given name Si-eun, and may also refer to:

- Park Si-eun (actress) (born 1980), South Korean actress
- Park Si-eun (entertainer) (born 2001), South Korean actress and member of STAYC
