= Mongolia at the 2025 World Aquatics Championships =

- Flag of Mongolia
- World Aquatics code: MGL
- National federation: Mongolian Amateur Swimming Federation
- Website: masf.mn

in Singapore
- Competitors: 8 in 2 sports
- Medals: Gold 0 Silver 0 Bronze 0 Total 0

World Aquatics Championships appearances
- 1973; 1975; 1978; 1982; 1986; 1991; 1994; 1998; 2001; 2003; 2005; 2007; 2009; 2011; 2013; 2015; 2017; 2019; 2022; 2023; 2024; 2025

Mongolia competed at the 2025 World Aquatics Championships in Singapore from 11 July to 3 August 2025.

== Competitors ==
The following is the list of competitors in the Championships.

Sport	Men	Women	Total
Open water swimming	2	2	4
Swimming	2	2	4
Total	4	4	8

== Open water swimming ==
Mixed

Athlete	Event	Final	
Athlete	Event	Time	Rank
Amgalangiin Altannar; Ganzorigtyn Sugar; Gongoryn Maidar; Temüüjingiin Anungoo	Team	1:31:48.7	22

== Swimming ==
Men

Athlete	Event	Heat		Semifinal		Final	
Athlete	Event	Time	Rank	Time	Rank	Time	Rank
Batbayaryn Enkhtamir	100 m freestyle	50.84	52	Did not advance			
Batbayaryn Enkhtamir	200 m freestyle	1:50.83	41	Did not advance			
Enkhtöriin Erkhes	50 m backstroke	25.76 NR	43	Did not advance			
Enkhtöriin Erkhes	100 m backstroke	57.25 NR	52	Did not advance			

Women

Athlete	Event	Heat		Semifinal		Final	
Athlete	Event	Time	Rank	Time	Rank	Time	Rank
Batbayaryn Enkhkhüslen	200 m freestyle	2:01.14	30	Did not advance			
Batbayaryn Enkhkhüslen	400 m freestyle	4:19.80	25	—		Did not advance	
Enkh-Amgalangiin Ariuntamir	50 m backstroke	30.93	47	Did not advance			
Enkh-Amgalangiin Ariuntamir	100 m backstroke	1:07.53	50	Did not advance			

Mixed

Athlete	Event	Heat		Final	
Athlete	Event	Time	Rank	Time	Rank
Enkh-Amgalangiin Ariuntamir; Batbayaryn Enkhkhüslen; Batbayaryn Enkhtamir; Enkhtöriin Erkhes	4 × 100 m medley relay	4:05.61	24	Did not advance	
