= Mongolia at the 2024 World Aquatics Championships =

- Flag of Mongolia
- FINA code: MGL
- National federation: Mongolian Amateur Swimming Federation
- Website: masf.mn

in Doha, Qatar
- Competitors: 4 in 1 sport
- Medals: Gold 0 Silver 0 Bronze 0 Total 0

World Aquatics Championships appearances
- 1973; 1975; 1978; 1982; 1986; 1991; 1994; 1998; 2001; 2003; 2005; 2007; 2009; 2011; 2013; 2015; 2017; 2019; 2022; 2023; 2024

Mongolia competed at the 2024 World Aquatics Championships in Doha, Qatar from 2 to 18 February.

== Competitors ==
The following is the list of competitors in the Championships.

Sport	Men	Women	Total
Swimming	2	2	4
Total	2	2	4

== Swimming ==
Mongolia entered 4 swimmers into 9 events. None of them advanced.

Men

Athlete	Event	Heat		Semifinal		Final	
Athlete	Event	Time	Rank	Time	Rank	Time	Rank
Enkhtamir Batbayar	100 metre freestyle	51.55	50	Did not advance			
Enkhtamir Batbayar	200 metre freestyle	1:52.96	44	Did not advance			
Erkhes Enkhtur	50 metre backstroke	26.72	36	Did not advance			
Erkhes Enkhtur	100 metre backstroke	58.89	46	Did not advance			

Women

Athlete	Event	Heat		Semifinal		Final	
Athlete	Event	Time	Rank	Time	Rank	Time	Rank
Batbayaryn Enkhkhüslen	100 metre freestyle	56.88	29	Did not advance			
Batbayaryn Enkhkhüslen	200 metre freestyle	2:00.22	23	Did not advance			
Ariuntamir Enkh-Amgalan	50 metre backstroke	30.32	39	Did not advance			
Ariuntamir Enkh-Amgalan	100 metre backstroke	1:05.27	40	Did not advance			

Mixed

Athlete	Event	Heat		Semifinal		Final	
Athlete	Event	Time	Rank	Time	Rank	Time	Rank
Ariuntamir Enkh-Amgalan; Erkhes Enkhtur; Enkhtamir Batbayar; Batbayaryn Enkhkhüslen	4 × 100 m medley relay	4:05.09 NR	20	—		Did not advance	
