= 2021 FINA World Swimming Championships (25 m) – Women's 200 metre freestyle =

Swimming competition

Women's 200 metre freestyle at the 2021 FINA World Swimming Championships (25 m)
- Venue: Etihad Arena
- Location: Abu Dhabi, United Arab Emirates
- Dates: 16 December (heats and final)
- Competitors: 49 from 44 nations
- Winning time: 1:50.31 WR

Medalists
gold medal	Siobhán Haughey	Hong Kong
silver medal	Rebecca Smith	Canada
bronze medal	Paige Madden	United States

The Women's 200 metre freestyle competition of the 2021 FINA World Swimming Championships (25 m) was held on 16 December 2021.

== Records ==
Prior to the competition, the existing world and championship records were as follows.

World record	Sarah Sjöström (SWE)	1:50.43	Eindhoven, Netherlands	12 August 2017
Competition record	Sarah Sjöström (SWE)	1:50.78	Doha, Qatar	7 December 2014

The following new records were set during this competition:

Date	Event	Name	National team	Time	Record
16 December	Final	Siobhán Haughey	Hong Kong	1:50.31	WR, CR

== Results ==
=== Heats ===
The heats were started at 10:06.

Rank	Heat	Lane	Name	National team	Time	Notes
1	4	5	Rebecca Smith	Canada	1:52.86	Q
1	5	4	Siobhán Haughey	Hong Kong	1:52.86	Q
3	5	6	Paige Madden	United States	1:53.30	Q
4	5	5	Charlotte Bonnet	France	1:54.43	Q
5	5	2	Joanna Evans	Bahamas	1:54.51	Q
6	4	3	Katja Fain	Slovenia	1:54.61	Q
7	3	2	Summer McIntosh	Canada	1:54.63	Q
8	3	4	Marrit Steenbergen	Netherlands	1:54.70	Q
9	3	5	Barbora Seemanová	Czech Republic	1:54.75	
10	3	3	Ekaterina Nikonova	Russian Swimming Federation	1:54.99	
11	4	4	Freya Anderson	Great Britain	1:56.19	
12	4	6	Isabel Marie Gose	Germany	1:56.36	
13	4	2	Anna Egorova	Russian Swimming Federation	1:56.44	
14	4	0	Cheng Yujie	China	1:56.80	
15	5	9	Lena Kreundl	Austria	1:57.03	
16	3	0	Elisbet Gámez	Cuba	1:57.26	NR
17	3	7	Lucy Hope	Great Britain	1:57.28	
18	3	6	Valentine Dumont	Belgium	1:57.56	
19	5	3	Annika Bruhn	Germany	1:57.74	
20	3	1	Janja Šegel	Slovenia	1:57.81	
21	4	7	Gabrielle Roncatto	Brazil	1:57.85	
22	4	1	Monique Olivier	Luxembourg	1:59.32	
23	5	7	Nikolett Pádár	Hungary	1:59.43	
24	3	9	Laura Littlejohn	New Zealand	1:59.67	
25	2	3	Inés Marín	Chile	2:00.02	
26	5	1	Sabína Kupčová	Slovakia	2:00.28	
27	3	8	Ieva Maļuka	Latvia	2:00.40	
28	5	0	Laura Lahtinen	Finland	2:00.65	
29	2	5	Kornkarnjana Sapianchai	Thailand	2:00.97	
30	2	4	Zhanet Angelova	Bulgaria	2:01.03	
31	5	8	Merve Tuncel	Turkey	2:01.04	
32	2	2	Julimar Ávila	Honduras	2:01.68	
33	1	4	Elisabeth Timmer	Aruba	2:03.45	NR
34	4	9	Michaela Pulford	South Africa	2:03.67	
35	2	6	Sasha Gatt	Malta	2:05.16	
36	2	8	Lina Khiyara	Morocco	2:05.58	
37	2	7	Chrysoula Karamanou	Cyprus	2:05.60	
38	1	0	Batbayaryn Enkhkhüslen	Mongolia	2:06.29	
39	2	1	Fatima Alkaramova	Azerbaijan	2:07.65	
40	1	3	Natalia Kuipers	United States Virgin Islands	2:08.06	
41	2	0	Ani Poghosyan	Armenia	2:08.14	
42	1	5	Jehanara Nabi	Pakistan	2:08.51	
43	1	6	Alexia Savinova	Moldova	2:08.95	
44	1	2	Bianca Mitchell	Antigua and Barbuda	2:11.04	
45	1	7	Katie Rock	Albania	2:11.96	
46	2	9	Sara Akasha	United Arab Emirates	2:12.89	
47	1	8	Charissa Panuve	Tonga	2:19.53	
48	1	9	Keana Santos	Guam	2:24.08	
49	1	1	Ammara Pinto	Malawi	2:24.97	
	4	8	Quah Jing Wen	Singapore	DNS	

=== Final ===
The final was held at 18:09.

Rank	Lane	Name	National team	Time	Notes
1st place, gold medalist(s)	5	Siobhán Haughey	Hong Kong	1:50.31	WR
2nd place, silver medalist(s)	4	Rebecca Smith	Canada	1:52.24	NR
3rd place, bronze medalist(s)	3	Paige Madden	United States	1:53.01	
4	7	Katja Fain	Slovenia	1:53.48	NR
5	1	Summer McIntosh	Canada	1:53.65	
6	6	Charlotte Bonnet	France	1:53.68	
7	8	Marrit Steenbergen	Netherlands	1:54.32	
8	2	Joanna Evans	Bahamas	1:54.93	
