= 2021 FINA World Swimming Championships (25 m) – Women's 100 metre freestyle =

Swimming competition

Women's 100 metre freestyle at the 2021 FINA World Swimming Championships (25 m)
- Venue: Etihad Arena
- Location: Abu Dhabi, United Arab Emirates
- Dates: 17 December (heats and semifinals); 18 December (final)
- Competitors: 85 from 77 nations
- Winning time: 50.98 CR

Medalists
gold medal	Siobhán Haughey	Hong Kong
silver medal	Sarah Sjöström	Sweden
bronze medal	Abbey Weitzeil	United States

The Women's 100 metre freestyle competition of the 2021 FINA World Swimming Championships (25 m) was held on 17 and 18 December 2021.

== Records ==
Prior to the competition, the existing world and championship records were as follows.

World record	Cate Campbell (AUS)	50.25	Adelaide, Australia	26 October 2017
Competition record	Ranomi Kromowidjojo (NED)	51.14	Hangzhou, China	13 December 2018

The following new records were set during this competition:

Date	Event	Name	Nation	Time	Record
18 December	Final	Siobhán Haughey	Hong Kong	50.98	CR

== Results ==
=== Heats ===
The heats were started on 17 December at 10:03.

Rank	Heat	Lane	Name	Nationality	Time	Notes
1	9	4	Siobhán Haughey	Hong Kong	51.97	Q
2	8	4	Sarah Sjöström	Sweden	52.21	Q
3	8	3	Kayla Sanchez	Canada	52.38	Q
4	7	4	Abbey Weitzeil	United States	52.81	Q
5	8	5	Katarzyna Wasick	Poland	52.98	Q
6	9	5	Freya Anderson	Great Britain	53.02	Q
7	7	5	Marie Wattel	France	53.32	Q
8	9	9	Torri Huske	United States	53.34	Q
9	9	6	Michelle Coleman	Sweden	53.41	Q
10	8	0	Zhu Menghui	China	53.47	Q
11	9	2	Lucy Hope	Great Britain	53.49	Q
12	8	6	Charlotte Bonnet	France	53.50	Q
13	7	3	Marrit Steenbergen	Netherlands	53.51	Q
14	7	6	Julie Kepp Jensen	Denmark	53.63	Q
15	8	1	Rebecca Smith	Canada	53.70	Q
16	7	8	Cheng Yujie	China	53.86	Q
17	9	8	Janja Šegel	Slovenia	53.95	
18	6	4	Laura Littlejohn	New Zealand	53.96	
19	5	4	Diana Petkova	Bulgaria	54.05	
20	7	7	Costanza Cocconcelli	Italy	54.07	
20	9	7	Ekaterina Nikonova	Russian Swimming Federation	54.07	
22	6	3	Holly Barratt	Australia	54.18	
23	6	1	Kalia Antoniou	Cyprus	54.29	NR
24	8	2	Kim Busch	Netherlands	54.32	
25	6	5	Fanni Gyurinovics	Hungary	54.39	
25	8	7	Fanny Teijonsalo	Finland	54.39	
27	6	8	Farida Osman	Egypt	54.42	NR
28	7	2	Annika Bruhn	Germany	54.50	
29	6	2	Kim Seo-yeong	South Korea	54.83	
30	5	3	Bianca Costea	Romania	54.84	
31	9	0	Danielle Hill	Ireland	54.98	
32	9	1	Julie Meynen	Luxembourg	55.09	
33	7	1	Marie Pietruschka	Germany	55.24	
34	6	6	Jóhanna Elín Guðmundsdóttir	Iceland	55.27	
35	6	7	Ieva Maļuka	Latvia	55.30	
36	5	2	Amel Melih	Algeria	55.34	NR
37	6	0	Jana Pavalić	Croatia	55.45	
38	7	9	Nina Stanisavljević	Serbia	55.52	
39	7	0	Cornelia Pammer	Austria	55.71	
40	5	6	Maddy Moore	Bermuda	55.72	
41	5	7	Krystal Lara	Dominican Republic	55.81	NR
42	5	8	Inés Marín	Chile	55.99	NR
43	5	5	Kornkarnjana Sapianchai	Thailand	56.29	
44	5	1	Mia Blaževska Eminova	North Macedonia	56.55	
45	4	5	María Schutzmeier	Nicaragua	56.97	
46	8	8	Selen Özbilen	Turkey	57.07	
47	5	9	Isabella Alas	El Salvador	57.22	NR
48	3	5	Batbayaryn Enkhkhüslen	Mongolia	57.25	
49	4	3	Chloe Farro	Aruba	57.57	
50	4	1	Alison Jackson	Cayman Islands	57.70	
51	5	0	Mònica Ramírez	Andorra	58.24	
52	4	0	Leiya Istambouli	Lebanon	58.52	
53	4	2	Lina Khiyara	Morocco	58.62	
54	1	2	Alisa Bech Vestergård	Faroe Islands	58.83	
55	4	8	Catarina Sousa	Angola	58.88	
56	4	7	Jeanne Boutbien	Senegal	58.96	
57	1	7	Tessa Ip Hen Cheung	Mauritius	59.34	
58	4	6	Colleen Furgeson	Marshall Islands	59.35	NR
59	4	9	Ani Poghosyan	Armenia	59.56	
60	3	1	Aleka Persaud	Guyana	59.70	
61	4	4	Gabriela Santis	Guatemala	59.93	
62	3	3	Mariam Imnadze	Georgia	1:00.12	
63	3	9	Jehanara Nabi	Pakistan	1:00.37	
64	3	6	Andela Antunović	Montenegro	1:00.52	
65	3	2	Bhakthi Karunasena	Sri Lanka	1:01.32	
66	3	8	Mona Kilani	Jordan	1:01.33	
67	3	0	Mya de Freitas	Saint Vincent and the Grenadines	1:02.05	
68	1	0	Viktoriia Kutuzova	Kyrgyzstan	1:02.60	
68	3	7	Fjorda Shabani	Kosovo	1:02.60	
70	2	5	Khema Elizabeth	Seychelles	1:02.76	
71	2	6	Anushiya Tandukar	Nepal	1:02.77	
72	2	3	Ammara Pinto	Malawi	1:03.60	
73	2	1	Ekaterina Bordachyova	Tajikistan	1:03.93	
74	2	2	Charissa Panuve	Tonga	1:03.95	
75	1	6	Sonia Aktar	Bangladesh	1:05.06	
76	1	1	Jourdyn Adams	Federated States of Micronesia	1:05.25	
77	2	4	Mineri Gomez	Guam	1:05.54	
78	1	3	Asaka Litulumar	Northern Mariana Islands	1:06.30	
79	2	7	Nafissath Radji	Benin	1:06.31	
80	1	9	Yuri Hosei	Palau	1:09.57	
81	1	5	Abbi Illis	Sint Maarten	1:14.97	
82	2	9	Imelda Ximenes Belo	Timor-Leste	1:15.12	
83	2	8	Darcelle Ishimwe	Burundi	1:15.64	
84	1	4	Haneen Ibrahim	Sudan	1:16.29	
85	1	8	Naima-Zahra Amison	Djibouti	1:25.01	
	2	0	Ria Save	Tanzania	DNS	
	3	4	Abiola Ogunbanwo	Nigeria	DNS	
	6	9	Chan Zi Yi	Singapore	DNS	
	8	9	Nina Kost	Switzerland	DNS	
	9	3	Barbora Seemanová	Czech Republic	DNS	

=== Semifinals ===
The semifinals were started on 17 December at 19:09.

Rank	Heat	Lane	Name	Nationality	Time	Notes
1	1	4	Sarah Sjöström	Sweden	51.53	Q
2	2	4	Siobhán Haughey	Hong Kong	51.82	Q
3	2	3	Katarzyna Wasick	Poland	52.28	Q
3	2	5	Kayla Sanchez	Canada	52.28	Q
5	1	5	Abbey Weitzeil	United States	52.29	Q
5	2	1	Marrit Steenbergen	Netherlands	52.29	Q
7	1	6	Torri Huske	United States	52.48	Q
8	2	6	Marie Wattel	France	52.59	Q
9	2	2	Michelle Coleman	Sweden	52.64	
10	1	3	Freya Anderson	Great Britain	52.67	
11	1	7	Charlotte Bonnet	France	53.06	
12	2	8	Rebecca Smith	Canada	53.22	
13	1	8	Cheng Yujie	China	53.29	
14	1	1	Julie Kepp Jensen	Denmark	53.30	
15	1	2	Zhu Menghui	China	53.36	
16	2	7	Lucy Hope	Great Britain	53.41	

=== Final ===
The final was held on 18 December at 18:07.

Rank	Lane	Name	Nationality	Time	Notes
1st place, gold medalist(s)	5	Siobhán Haughey	Hong Kong	50.98	CR
2nd place, silver medalist(s)	4	Sarah Sjöström	Sweden	51.31	
3rd place, bronze medalist(s)	2	Abbey Weitzeil	United States	51.64	
4	3	Katarzyna Wasick	Poland	51.71	
5	6	Kayla Sanchez	Canada	51.86	
6	1	Torri Huske	United States	51.93	
7	8	Marie Wattel	France	52.37	
8	7	Marrit Steenbergen	Netherlands	52.40	
