= Mongolia at the 2015 World Aquatics Championships =

- Flag of Mongolia
- FINA code: MGL
- National federation: Mongolian Amateur Swimming Federation

in Kazan, Russia
- Competitors: 4 in 1 sport
- Medals: Gold 0 Silver 0 Bronze 0 Total 0

World Aquatics Championships appearances
- 1973; 1975; 1978; 1982; 1986; 1991; 1994; 1998; 2001; 2003; 2005; 2007; 2009; 2011; 2013; 2015; 2017; 2019; 2022; 2023; 2024

Mongolia competed at the 2015 World Aquatics Championships in Kazan, Russia from 24 July to 9 August 2015.

== Swimming ==
Mongolian swimmers have achieved qualifying standards in the following events (up to a maximum of 2 swimmers in each event at the A-standard entry time, and 1 at the B-standard):

Men

Athlete	Event	Heat		Semifinal		Final	
Athlete	Event	Time	Rank	Time	Rank	Time	Rank
Batsaikhan Dulguun	50 m freestyle	25.42	79	did not advance			
Batsaikhan Dulguun	100 m butterfly	58.57	64	did not advance			
Delgerkhuu Myagmar	100 m freestyle	55.67	95	did not advance			
Delgerkhuu Myagmar	50 m breaststroke	32.07	63	did not advance			

Women

Athlete	Event	Heat		Semifinal		Final	
Athlete	Event	Time	Rank	Time	Rank	Time	Rank
Enkhkhuslen Batbayar	100 m freestyle	1:05.15	82	did not advance			
Enkhkhuslen Batbayar	100 m backstroke	1:13.52	62	did not advance			
Yesui Bayar	50 m freestyle	29.90	88	did not advance			
Yesui Bayar	50 m backstroke	35.44	49	did not advance			

Mixed

Athlete	Event	Heat		Final	
Athlete	Event	Time	Rank	Time	Rank
Yesui Bayar; Batsaikhan Dulguun; Enkhkhuslen Batbayar; Delgerkhuu Myagmar	4 × 100 m freestyle relay	4:08.85	26	did not advance	
Enkhkhuslen Batbayar; Delgerkhuu Myagmar; Batsaikhan Dulguun; Yesui Bayar	4 × 100 m medley relay	4:34.46	26	did not advance	
