= 2022 FINA World Swimming Championships (25 m) – Women's 200 metre freestyle =

Swimming competition

Women's 200 metre freestyle at the 2022 FINA World Swimming Championships (25 m)
- Venue: Melbourne Sports and Aquatic Centre
- Location: Melbourne, Australia
- Dates: 18 December (heats and final)
- Competitors: 35 from 31 nations
- Winning time: 1:51.65

Medalists
gold medal	Siobhán Haughey	Hong Kong
silver medal	Rebecca Smith	Canada
bronze medal	Marrit Steenbergen	Netherlands

The Women's 200 metre freestyle competition of the 2022 FINA World Swimming Championships (25 m) was held on 18 December 2022.

== Records ==
Prior to the competition, the existing world and championship records were as follows.

World record	Siobhán Haughey (HKG)	1:50.31	Abu Dhabi, United Arab Emirates	16 December 2021
Competition record	Siobhán Haughey (HKG)	1:50.31	Abu Dhabi, United Arab Emirates	16 December 2021

== Results ==
=== Heats ===
The heats were started at 11:05.

Rank	Heat	Lane	Name	Nationality	Time	Notes
1	4	5	Marrit Steenbergen	Netherlands	1:52.83	Q
2	5	4	Siobhán Haughey	Hong Kong	1:53.39	Q
3	4	3	Erin Gemmell	United States	1:53.47	Q
4	5	3	Barbora Seemanová	Czech Republic	1:53.67	Q
5	5	5	Rebecca Smith	Canada	1:53.85	Q
6	3	5	Leah Neale	Australia	1:54.05	Q
7	5	7	Taylor Ruck	Canada	1:54.15	Q
8	3	4	Madison Wilson	Australia	1:54.18	Q
9	5	6	Hali Flickinger	United States	1:54.20	
10	3	3	Katja Fain	Slovenia	1:54.96	
11	3	7	Snæfríður Jórunnardóttir	Iceland	1:55.34	NR
12	5	1	Helena Bach	Denmark	1:55.79	
13	4	2	Valentine Dumont	Belgium	1:55.80	
14	5	2	Chihiro Igarashi	Japan	1:56.22	
15	5	8	Batbayaryn Enkhkhüslen	Mongolia	1:56.46	NR
16	4	6	Stephanie Balduccini	Brazil	1:57.09	
17	4	7	Elisbet Gámez	Cuba	1:57.11	NR
18	3	6	Giovanna Diamante	Brazil	1:57.44	
19	3	8	Caitlin Deans	New Zealand	1:57.93	
20	3	1	Sofia Åstedt	Sweden	1:58.04	
21	2	2	Hur Yeon-kyung	South Korea	1:58.41	
22	2	6	Inés Marín	Chile	1:58.79	NR
23	2	3	Merve Tuncel	Turkey	1:59.32	
24	2	5	Martina Cibulková	Slovakia	2:02.20	
25	2	4	Iman Avdić	Bosnia and Herzegovina	2:02.30	
26	2	8	Lucero Mejía	Guatemala	2:02.57	NR
27	2	1	Sasha Gatt	Malta	2:03.72	
28	2	7	Julimar Ávila	Honduras	2:04.28	NR
29	1	4	Ani Poghosyan	Armenia	2:04.30	NR
30	1	5	Jehanara Nabi	Pakistan	2:06.32	NR
31	1	3	Kaltra Meca	Albania	2:10.75	
32	1	1	Darýa Semýonowa	Turkmenistan	2:12.43	
33	1	6	Lubaina Ali	Suspended Member Federation	2:13.65	
34	1	2	Charissa Panuve	Tonga	2:17.97	
35	1	7	Jhnayali Tokome-Garap	Papua New Guinea	2:24.23	
	1	8	Maha Al-Shehhi	United Arab Emirates	Did not start	
	3	2	Zsuzsanna Jakabos	Hungary	Did not start	
	4	1	Laura Lahtinen	Finland	Did not start	
	4	4	Li Bingjie	China	Did not start	
	4	8	Gan Ching Hwee	Singapore	Did not start	

=== Final ===
The final was held at 20:36.

Rank	Lane	Name	Nationality	Time	Notes
1st place, gold medalist(s)	5	Siobhán Haughey	Hong Kong	1:51.65	
2nd place, silver medalist(s)	2	Rebecca Smith	Canada	1:52.24	
3rd place, bronze medalist(s)	4	Marrit Steenbergen	Netherlands	1:52.28	
4	3	Erin Gemmell	United States	1:52.56	
5	6	Barbora Seemanová	Czech Republic	1:52.66	NR
6	7	Leah Neale	Australia	1:52.84	
7	1	Taylor Ruck	Canada	1:52.88	
8	8	Madison Wilson	Australia	1:53.39	
