= Mongolia at the 2017 World Aquatics Championships =

- Flag of Mongolia
- FINA code: MGL
- National federation: Mongolian Amateur Swimming Federation

in Budapest, Hungary
- Competitors: 4 in 1 sport
- Medals: Gold 0 Silver 0 Bronze 0 Total 0

World Aquatics Championships appearances
- 1973; 1975; 1978; 1982; 1986; 1991; 1994; 1998; 2001; 2003; 2005; 2007; 2009; 2011; 2013; 2015; 2017; 2019; 2022; 2023; 2024

Mongolia competed at the 2017 World Aquatics Championships in Budapest, Hungary from 14 July to 30 July.

== Swimming ==
Mongolia has received a Universality invitation from FINA to send a maximum of four swimmers (two men and two women) to the World Championships.

Athlete	Event	Heat		Semifinal		Final	
Athlete	Event	Time	Rank	Time	Rank	Time	Rank
Boldbaataryn Buyantogtokh	Men's 100 m freestyle	56.50	94	did not advance			
Boldbaataryn Buyantogtokh	Men's 100 m backstroke	1:04.52	46	did not advance			
Myagmaryn Delgerkhüü	Men's 50 m freestyle	24.49	=91	did not advance			
Myagmaryn Delgerkhüü	Men's 50 m butterfly	26.95	66	did not advance			
Batbayaryn Enkhkhuslen	Women's 100 m freestyle	1:00.92	=61	did not advance			
Batbayaryn Enkhkhuslen	Women's 100 m breaststroke	1:18.70	46	did not advance			
Yesuin Bayar	Women's 50 m freestyle	28.74	64	did not advance			
Yesuin Bayar	Women's 100 m backstroke	1:14.77	56	did not advance			
