= Mongolia at the 2022 World Aquatics Championships =

- Flag of Mongolia
- FINA code: MGL
- National federation: Mongolian Amateur Swimming Federation

in Budapest, Hungary
- Competitors: 4 in 1 sport
- Medals: Gold 0 Silver 0 Bronze 0 Total 0

World Aquatics Championships appearances
- 1973; 1975; 1978; 1982; 1986; 1991; 1994; 1998; 2001; 2003; 2005; 2007; 2009; 2011; 2013; 2015; 2017; 2019; 2022; 2023; 2024

Mongolia competed at the 2022 World Aquatics Championships in Budapest, Hungary from 17 June to 3 July.

== Swimming ==
Mongolia entered four swimmers.

Men

Athlete	Event	Heat		Semifinal		Final	
Athlete	Event	Time	Rank	Time	Rank	Time	Rank
Batbayaryn Enkhtamir	50 m freestyle	24.42	64	did not advance			
Batbayaryn Enkhtamir	100 m freestyle	52.95	70	did not advance			
Zandanbal Gunsennorov	50 m breaststroke	DSQ		did not advance			
Zandanbal Gunsennorov	100 m breaststroke	1:07.79	58	did not advance			

Women

Athlete	Event	Heat		Semifinal		Final	
Athlete	Event	Time	Rank	Time	Rank	Time	Rank
Batbayaryn Enkhkhüslen	100 m freestyle	58.16	33	did not advance			
Batbayaryn Enkhkhüslen	50 m butterfly	29.08	45	did not advance			
Enkh-Amgalangiin Ariuntamir	50 m backstroke	31.95	31	did not advance			
Enkh-Amgalangiin Ariuntamir	100 m backstroke	1:10.31	39	did not advance			

Mixed

Athlete	Event	Heat		Final	
Athlete	Event	Time	Rank	Time	Rank
Batbayaryn Enkhkhüslen; Batbayaryn Enkhtamir; Enkh-Amgalangiin Ariuntamir; Zandanbal Gunsennorov	4×100 m freestyle relay	3:53.96	22	did not advance	
Batbayaryn Enkhkhüslen; Batbayaryn Enkhtamir; Enkh-Amgalangiin Ariuntamir; Zandanbal Gunsennorov	4 × 100 m medley relay	4:15.32	23	did not advance	
