= Swimming at the 2022 Asian Games – Women's 200 metre freestyle =

Women's 200 metre freestyle at the 2022 Asian Games
- Venue: Hangzhou Olympic Expo Aquatics Center
- Date: 25 September 2023
- Competitors: 23 from 17 nations

Medalists
gold medal	Siobhán Haughey	Hong Kong
silver medal	Li Bingjie	China
bronze medal	Liu Yaxin	China

The women's 200 metre freestyle event at the 2022 Asian Games took place on 25 September 2023 at the Hangzhou Olympic Expo Center. Hong Kong's Siobhán Haughey, the defending champion, successfully defended her title and won the gold with a time of 1:54.96.

== Schedule ==
All times are China Standard Time (UTC+08:00)

Date	Time	Event
Monday, 25 September 2023	10:36	Heats
Monday, 25 September 2023	19:48	Final

== Records ==
Prior to this competition, the existing world, Asian and Games records were as follows.

World Record	Mollie O'Callaghan (AUS)	1:52.85	Fukuoka, Japan	26 July 2023
Asian Record	Siobhán Haughey (HKG)	1:53.92	Tokyo, Japan	28 July 2021
Games Record	Zhu Qianwei (CHN)	1:56.65	Guangzhou, China	13 November 2010

== Results ==
=== Heats ===
Rank	Heat	Athlete	Time	Notes
1	2	Li Bingjie (CHN)	1:58.90	
2	1	Hur Yeon-kyung (KOR)	2:00.18	
3	1	Liu Yaxin (CHN)	2:00.21	
4	2	Nagisa Ikemoto (JPN)	2:00.36	
5	3	Siobhán Haughey (HKG)	2:00.75	
6	2	Batbayaryn Enkhkhüslen (MGL)	2:00.89	
7	1	Gan Ching Hwee (SGP)	2:01.31	
8	3	Rio Shirai (JPN)	2:01.63	
9	3	Diana Taszhanova (KAZ)	2:03.24	
10	3	Tinky Ho (HKG)	2:03.71	
11	3	Teia Salvino (PHI)	2:04.51	
12	1	Dhinidhi Desinghu (IND)	2:07.10	
13	1	Napatsawan Jaritkla (THA)	2:07.19	
14	3	Nguyễn Thuý Hiền (VIE)	2:07.98	
15	2	Ashley Lim (SGP)	2:08.35	
16	2	Kornkarnjana Sapianchai (THA)	2:10.19	
17	2	Jehanara Nabi (PAK)	2:11.15	
18	2	Anna Nikishkina (KGZ)	2:13.42	
18	2	Duana Lama (NEP)	2:16.29	
20	1	Kuok Hei Cheng (MAC)	2:19.27	
21	3	Makelyta Singsombath (LAO)	2:20.29	
22	1	Maha Al-Shehhi (UAE)	2:21.00	
23	3	Enkhbaataryn Ermüün (MGL)	2:26.92	

=== Final ===
Rank	Athlete	Time	Notes
1st place, gold medalist(s)	Siobhán Haughey (HKG)	1:54.12	GR
2nd place, silver medalist(s)	Li Bingjie (CHN)	1:56.00	
3rd place, bronze medalist(s)	Liu Yaxin (CHN)	1:56.43	
4	Hur Yeon-kyung (KOR)	1:58.92	
5	Nagisa Ikemoto (JPN)	1:59.32	
6	Rio Shirai (JPN)	2:00.76	
7	Gan Ching Hwee (SGP)	2:02.26	
8	Batbayaryn Enkhkhüslen (MGL)	2:02.70	
