= Mongolia at the 2019 World Aquatics Championships =

- Flag of Mongolia
- FINA code: MGL
- National federation: Mongolian Amateur Swimming Federation

in Gwangju, South Korea
- Competitors: 4 in 1 sport
- Medals: Gold 0 Silver 0 Bronze 0 Total 0

World Aquatics Championships appearances
- 1973; 1975; 1978; 1982; 1986; 1991; 1994; 1998; 2001; 2003; 2005; 2007; 2009; 2011; 2013; 2015; 2017; 2019; 2022; 2023; 2024

Mongolia competed at the 2019 World Aquatics Championships in Gwangju, South Korea from 12 to 28 July.

== Swimming ==
Mongolia entered four swimmers.

Men

Athlete	Event	Heat		Semifinal		Final	
Athlete	Event	Time	Rank	Time	Rank	Time	Rank
Günsennorovyn Zandanbal	50 m breaststroke	30.23	=61	did not advance			
Günsennorovyn Zandanbal	100 m breaststroke	1:07.92	79	did not advance			
Myagmaryn Delgerkhüü	50 m freestyle	23.93	72	did not advance			
Myagmaryn Delgerkhüü	100 m freestyle	54.43	92	did not advance			

Women

Athlete	Event	Heat		Semifinal		Final	
Athlete	Event	Time	Rank	Time	Rank	Time	Rank
Batbayaryn Enkhkhüslen	50 m freestyle	27.66	58	did not advance			
Batbayaryn Enkhkhüslen	100 m freestyle	59.76	59	did not advance			
Khuyagbaataryn Enkhzul	50 m butterfly	30.80	51	did not advance			
Khuyagbaataryn Enkhzul	100 m butterfly	1:14.23	50	did not advance			

Mixed

Athlete	Event	Heat		Final	
Athlete	Event	Time	Rank	Time	Rank
Delgerkhuu Myagmar; Zandanbal Gunsennorov; Enkhzul Khuyagbaatar; Enkhkhuslen Batbayar	4×100 m freestyle relay	3:50.99	28	did not advance	
