= 2021 FINA World Swimming Championships (25 m) – Women's 4 × 100 metre medley relay =

Swimming competition

Women's 4 × 100 metre medley relay at the 2021 FINA World Swimming Championships (25 m)
- Venue: Etihad Arena
- Location: Abu Dhabi, United Arab Emirates
- Dates: 21 December (heats and final)
- Competitors: 66 from 13 nations
- Teams: 13
- Winning time: 3:46.20 ER

Medalists
gold medal	Louise Hansson; Sophie Hansson; Sarah Sjöström; Michelle Coleman; Hanna Rosvall; Emelie Fast	Sweden
silver medal	Kylie Masse; Sydney Pickrem; Maggie Mac Neil; Kayla Sanchez; Katerine Savard; Summer McIntosh	Canada
bronze medal	Peng Xuwei; Tang Qianting; Zhang Yufei; Cheng Yujie; Wan Letian; Yu Yiting; Zhu Jiaming	China

The Women's 4 × 100 metre medley relay competition of the 2021 FINA World Swimming Championships (25 m) was held on 21 December 2021.

== Records ==
Prior to the competition, the existing world and championship records were as follows.

World record	United States (USA)	3:44.52	Budapest, Hungary	21 November 2020
Competition record	United States (USA)	3:45.58	Hangzhou, China	16 December 2018

== Results ==
=== Heats ===
The heats were started at 10:21.

Rank	Heat	Lane	Nation	Swimmers	Time	Notes
1	1	5	Sweden	Hanna Rosvall (57.86); Emelie Fast (1:05.59); Louise Hansson (56.04); Michelle Coleman (53.18)	3:52.67	Q
2	1	4	Canada	Kylie Masse (56.62); Sydney Pickrem (1:05.46); Katerine Savard (57.41); Summer McIntosh (53.55)	3:53.04	Q
3	2	3	Italy	Silvia Scalia (57.71); Martina Carraro (1:05.66); Ilaria Bianchi (57.39); Costanza Cocconcelli (52.92)	3:53.68	Q
4	2	4	United States	Katharine Berkoff (56.62); Kate Douglass (1:05.06); Torri Huske (58.81); Paige Madden (53.24)	3:53.73	Q
5	1	3	Russian Swimming Federation	Daria Ustinova (59.23); Nika Godun (1:04.46); Daria Klepikova (58.45); Ekaterina Nikonova (53.01)	3:55.15	Q
6	2	6	Netherlands	Maaike de Waard (57.30); Kim Busch (1:08.74); Tessa Giele (58.66); Marrit Steenbergen (51.98)	3:56.68	Q
7	2	2	Switzerland	Nina Kost (59.26); Lisa Mamié (1:05.67); Maria Ugolkova (56.98); Alexandra Touretski (54.88)	3:56.79	Q, NR
8	2	5	China	Wan Letian (57.63); Yu Yiting (1:07.23); Zhu Jiaming (59.39); Cheng Yujie (52.95)	3:57.20	Q
9	1	7	Turkey	Ekaterina Avramova (58.46); Viktoriya Zeynep Güneş (1:06.07); Nida Eliz Üstündağ (59.22); Selen Özbilen (56.65)	4:00.40	
10	2	7	South Korea	Kim Seo-yeong (1:00.20); Back Su-yeon (1:07.31); Park Ye-rin (58.32); Jeong So-eun (55.18)	4:01.01	
11	1	1	Austria	Caroline Pilhatsch (59.44); Cornelia Pammer (1:09.12); Lena Kreundl (59.24); Lena Opatril (55.16)	4:02.96	
12	1	6	Hong Kong	Stephanie Au (59.50); Lam Hoi Kiu (1:09.44); Natalie Kan (59.80); Katii Tang (55.10)	4:03.84	
13	2	8	Thailand	Jinjutha Pholjamjumrus (1:02.28); Phiangkhwan Pawapotako (1:10.99); Jenjira Srisaard (59.83); Kornkarnjana Sapianchai (56.09)	4:09.19	
	1	2	France		DNS	
	2	1	Slovakia		DNS	

=== Final ===
The final was held at 20:06.

Rank	Lane	Nation	Swimmers	Time	Notes
1st place, gold medalist(s)	4	Sweden	Louise Hansson (56.25); Sophie Hansson (1:03.70); Sarah Sjöström (54.65); Michelle Coleman (51.60)	3:46.20	ER
2nd place, silver medalist(s)	5	Canada	Kylie Masse (55.76); Sydney Pickrem (1:04.97); Maggie Mac Neil (55.30); Kayla Sanchez (51.33)	3:47.36	NR
3rd place, bronze medalist(s)	8	China	Peng Xuwei (57.12); Tang Qianting (1:03.25); Zhang Yufei (54.93); Cheng Yujie (52.11)	3:47.41	AS
4	6	United States	Katharine Berkoff (56.02); Emily Escobedo (1:04.99); Claire Curzan (55.61); Abbey Weitzeil (51.06)	3:47.68	
5	2	Russian Swimming Federation	Maria Kameneva (56.59); Nika Godun (1:04.53); Svetlana Chimrova (56.18); Ekaterina Nikonova (52.64)	3:49.94	NR
6	3	Italy	Silvia Scalia (57.56); Martina Carraro (1:04.98); Elena Di Liddo (55.93); Silvia Di Pietro (52.56)	3:51.03	NR
7	7	Netherlands	Maaike de Waard (56.64); Kim Busch (1:08.25); Tessa Giele (57.20); Marrit Steenbergen (51.88)	3:53.97	NR
8	1	Switzerland	Nina Kost (58.98); Lisa Mamié (1:05.79); Maria Ugolkova (56.35); Alexandra Touretski (54.72)	3:55.84	NR
