= 2019 European Junior Swimming Championships =

Water sport competitions

- Host city: Kazan, Russia
- Dates: 3-7 July 2019

The 2019 European Junior Swimming Championships (50 m) were held from 3 to 7 July 2019 in Kazan, Russia at the Palace of Water Sports. The Championships were organized by LEN, the European Swimming League, and were held in a 50-meter pool. The Championships were for girls aged 14–17 and boys age 15–18.

== Results ==
=== Boys ===
Games	Gold		Silver		Bronze	
50 m freestyle	Artem Selin; Germany	21.83; CR	Kenzo Simons; Netherlands	22.10	Vladyslav Bukhov; Ukraine	22.37
100 m freestyle	Matthew Richards; Great Britain	48.88	Robin Hanson; Sweden	49.05	Vladyslav Bukhov; Ukraine	49.25
200 m freestyle	Robin Hanson; Sweden	1:46.93	Matthew Richards; Great Britain	1:47.23	Antonio Djakovic; Switzerland	1:47.26
400 m freestyle	Antonio Djakovic; Switzerland	3:47.89 NR	Aleksandr Egorov; Russia	3:48.28	Robin Hanson; Sweden	3:50.53
800 m freestyle	Ilia Sibirtsev; Russia	7:52.83; CR	Aleksandr Egorov; Russia	7:53.34	Sven Schwarz; Germany	7:53.74
1500 m freestyle	Kirill Martynychev; Russia	15:01.59; CR	Ilia Sibirtsev; Russia	15:08.57	Sven Schwarz; Germany	15:09.41
50 m backstroke	Thomas Ceccon; Italy	25.24	Nikolai Zuev; Russia	25.29	Pavel Samusenko; Russia	25.59
100 m backstroke	Thomas Ceccon; Italy	54.13	Nikolai Zuev; Russia	54.40	Jan Čejka; Czech Republic	54.47
200 m backstroke	Jan Čejka; Czech Republic	1:57.51	Mewen Tomac; France	1:58.31	Egor Dolomanov; Russia	1:59.21
50 m breaststroke	Vladislav Gerasimenko; Russia	27.77	Archie Goodburn; Great Britain	27.89	Arkadios Aspougalis; Greece Caspar Corbeau; Netherlands	28.16
100 m breaststroke	Aleksandr Zhigalov; Russia	1:00.75	Caspar Corbeau; Netherlands	1:00.77	Demirkan Demir; Turkey Vladislav Gerasimenko; Russia	1:00.84
200 m breaststroke	Aleksandr Zhigalov; Russia	2:11.25	Caspar Corbeau; Netherlands	2:11.41	Léon Marchand; France	2:12.17
50 m butterfly	Noè Ponti; Switzerland	23.48; CR, NR	Luca Nik Armbruster; Germany	23.49	Andrei Minakov; Russia	23.66
100 m butterfly	Andrei Minakov; Russia	51.66	Josif Miladinov; Bulgaria	52.11	Luca Nik Armbruster; Germany	52.54
200 m butterfly	Igor Troyanovskyy; Ukraine	1:57.86	Dominik Márk Török; Hungary	1:58.79	Adam Hlobeň; Czech Republic	1:58.90
200 m individual medley	Apostolos Papastamos; Greece	1:59.93	Ron Polonsky; Israel	1:59.98	Gal Cohen Groumi; Israel	2:00.48
400 m individual medley	Apostolos Papastamos; Greece	4:15.18	Ilya Borodin; Russia	4:17.09	Léon Marchand; France	4:17.22
4×100 m freestyle relay	Russia; Andrei Minakov (49.35); Arseniy Chivilev (50.51); Aleksandr Shchegolev (49.37); Egor Pavlov (49.25); Vasilii Kukushkin; Aleksei Fedkin	3:18.48	Italy; Stefano Nicetto (49.82); Thomas Ceccon (48.17); Giovanni Caserta (50.44); Mario Nicotra (50.11); Giovanni Carraro	3:18.54	Great Britain; Archie Goodburn (50.48); Edward Mildred (50.33); Matthew Richards (49.14); Jacob Whittle (49.93); Adam Metcalf	3:19.88
4×200 m freestyle relay	Russia; Aleksandr Shchegolev (1:49.49); Aleksandr Egorov (1:48.33); Egor Pavlov (1:49.70); Nikita Danilov (1:48.97); Roman Moskalenko; Maksim Aleksandrov	7:16.49	Germany; Lukas Märtens (1:48.98); Sven Schwarz (1:49.04); Danny Schmidt (1:51.24); Rafael Miroslaw (1:49.05); Louis Dramm	7:18.31	Hungary; Gábor Zombori (1:48.76); Botond Ulrich (1:51.27); Bálint Pap (1:49.76); Milán Fábián (1:51.82); Szilárd Galyassy	7:21.61
4×100 m medley relay	Russia; Nikolai Zuev (54.03); Aleksandr Zhigalov (1:00.54); Andrei Minakov (51.71); Aleksandr Shchegolev (49.69); Pavel Samusenko; Vladislav Gerasimenko; Egor Pavlov; Arseniy Chivilev	3:35.97	Italy; Thomas Ceccon (53.91); Emiliano Tomasi (1:02.27); Claudio Faraci (52.90); Stefano Nicetto (48.55)	3:37.63	Turkey; Mert Ali Satır (56.87); Demirkan Demir (1:00.86); Emir Şimşek (54.68); Baturalp Ünlü (50.35)	3:42.76

=== Girls ===
Games	Gold		Silver		Bronze	
50 m freestyle	Costanza Cocconcelli; Italy	25.25	Isabel Marie Gose; Germany	25.30	Ekaterina Nikonova; Russia	25.33
100 m freestyle	Isabel Marie Gose; Germany	54.86	Maya Tobehn; Germany	55.21	Aleksandra Sabitova; Russia	55.38
200 m freestyle	Isabel Marie Gose; Germany	1:57.51; CR	Polina Nevmovenko; Russia	1:58.94	Maya Tobehn; Germany	1:59.72
400 m freestyle	Isabel Marie Gose; Germany	4:07.96	Giulia Salin; Italy	4:10.13	Yana Kurtseva; Russia	4:10.26
800 m freestyle	Giulia Salin; Italy	8:29.19; CR	Beril Böcekler; Turkey	8:34.56	Yana Kurtseva; Russia	8:39.82
1500 m freestyle	Giulia Salin; Italy	16:13.59	Beril Böcekler; Turkey	16:21.39	Viktória Mihályvári-Farkas; Hungary	16:26.03
50 m backstroke	Daria Vaskina; Russia	27.82; CR	Anastasia Gorbenko; Israel	28.21	Costanza Cocconcelli; Italy	28.55
100 m backstroke	Daria Vaskina; Russia	1:00.17	Erika Gaetani; Italy	1:01.62	Rafaela Azevedo; Portugal	1:01.85
200 m backstroke	Erika Gaetani; Italy	2:10.28	Honey Osrin; Great Britain	2:10.30	Anastasiya Shkurdai; Belarus	2:11.84
50 m breaststroke	Benedetta Pilato; Italy	30.16; CR	Kotryna Teterevkova; Lithuania	31.20	Anastasia Makarova; Russia	31.26
100 m breaststroke	Kayla van der Merwe; Great Britain	1:07.12	Anastasia Makarova; Russia	1:07.30	Evgeniia Chikunova; Russia	1:07.63
200 m breaststroke	Evgeniia Chikunova; Russia	2:23.06	Anastasia Makarova; Russia	2:26.06	Kayla van der Merwe; Great Britain	2:26.06
50 m butterfly	Anastasiya Shkurdai; Belarus	26.23	Naële Portecop; France	26.29	Costanza Cocconcelli; Italy	27.03
100 m butterfly	Anastasiya Shkurdai; Belarus	57.39; CR	Aleksandra Sabitova; Russia	59.27	Helena Biasibetti; Italy	59.69
200 m butterfly	Blanka Berecz; Hungary	2:09.80	Fanni Fábián; Hungary	2:09.97	Laura Lahtinen; Finland	2:09.97
200 m individual medley	Zoe Vogelmann; Germany	2:13.78	Anastasia Gorbenko; Israel	2:13.81	Lea Polonsky; Israel	2:14.29
400 m individual medley	Alba Vázquez; Spain	4:40.64; CR	Viktória Mihályvári-Farkas; Hungary	4:41.32	Katie Shanahan; Great Britain	4:43.36
4×100 m freestyle relay	Germany; Zoe Vogelmann (55.73); Lena Riedemann (55.85); Isabel Marie Gose (54.51); Maya Tobehn (55.15); Rosalie Kleyboldt; Jasmin Kroll	3:41.24; CR	Russia; Aleksandra Sabitova (55.64); Polina Nevmovenko (55.93); Elizaveta Ryndych (56.67); Ekaterina Nikonova (54.57); Daria Vaskina; Aleksandra Bykova	3:42.81	France; Océane Carnez (55.81); Lucile Tessariol (55.65); Lison Nowaczyck (56.24); Célia Pinsolle (55.80); Clara Le Bris	3:43.50
4×200 m freestyle relay	Russia; Aleksandra Bykova (2:00.84); Yana Kurtseva (2:00.99); Ekaterina Nikonova (2:01.33); Polina Nevmonenko (1:58.46); Margarita Varulnikova; Aleksandra Khailova	8:01.62	Great Britain; Freya Colbert (2:01.06); Tamryn Van Selm (1:59.65); Emma Russell (2:02.62); Mia Slevin (2:00.44); Honey Osrin; Lauren Wetherell	8:03.77	Germany; Zoe Vogelmann (2:02.75); Maya Tobehn (2:00.33); Rosalie Kleyboldt (2:01.82); Isabel Gose (1:59.09); Marlene Sandberg; Giulia Goerigk	8:03.99
4×100 m medley relay	Russia; Daria Vaskina (1:00.50); Anastasia Makarova (1:07.86); Aleksandra Sabitova (58.27); Ekaterina Nikonova (55.20); Elizaveta Agapitova; Evgeniia Chikunova; Anastasia Zhuravleva; Iana Sattarova	4:01.83; CR	Italy; Erika Gaetani (1:02.21); Benedetta Pilato (1:07.70); Helena Biasibetti (1:00.57); Costanza Cocconcelli (55.20); Elisa Mele; Antonella Crispino; Emma Menicucci	4:05.66	Great Britain; Pia Murray (1:02.32); Kayla van der Merwe (1:07.70); Maisie Elliott (1:00.94); Evelyn Davis (55.52); Medi Harris	4:06.48

=== Mixed events ===
Games	Gold		Silver		Bronze	
4×100 m freestyle relay	Germany; Rafael Miroslaw (49.54); Artem Selin (49.49); Maya Tobehn (54.98); Isabel Marie Gose (54.42); David Erbes; Rosalie Kleyboldt; Lena Riedemann	3:28.43; CR	Russia; Andrei Minakov (49.03); Aleksandr Shchegolev (49.67); Aleksandra Sabitova (55.15); Ekaterina Nikonova (55.27); Arseniy Chivilev; Vasilii Kukushkin; Daria Vaskina; Iana Sattarova	3:29.12	Italy; Stefano Nicetto (49.63); Thomas Ceccon (48.62); Maria Masciopinto (55.95); Emma Menicucci (55.92); Giovanni Carraro; Giovanni Caserta; Elisa Mele; Costanza Cocconcelli	3:30.12
4×100 m medley relay	Russia; Daria Vaskina (1:00.39); Aleksandr Zhigalov (1:00.69); Andrei Minakov (51.96); Aleksandra Sabitova (56.09); Nikolai Zuev; Anastasia Zhuravleva; Iana Sattarova	3:49.13	Germany; Lukas Märtens (55.67); Magdalena Heimrath (1:10.06); Luca Nik Armbruster (51.80); Maya Tobehn (54.69); Marvin Dahler; Malin Grosse; Björn Kammann; Rosalie Kleyboldt	3:52.22	Turkey; Mert Ali Satır (56.49); Demirkan Demir (1:00.80); Aleyna Özkan (59.54); Gizem Güvenç (55.52)	3:52.35

== Medal table ==
* Host nation (Russia)

Rank	Nation	Gold	Silver	Bronze	Total
1	Russia*	15	12	9	36
2	Germany	7	5	5	17
3	Italy	7	5	4	16
4	Great Britain	2	4	4	10
5	Belarus	2	0	1	3
5	Greece	2	0	1	3
5	Switzerland	2	0	1	3
8	Hungary	1	3	2	6
9	Sweden	1	1	1	3
10	Czech Republic	1	0	2	3
10	Ukraine	1	0	2	3
12	Spain	1	0	0	1
13	Israel	0	3	2	5
14	Netherlands	0	3	1	4
15	France	0	2	3	5
15	Turkey	0	2	3	5
17	Bulgaria	0	1	0	1
17	Lithuania	0	1	0	1
19	Finland	0	0	1	1
19	Portugal	0	0	1	1
Totals (20 entries)		42	42	43	127
