= Mongolia at the 2023 World Aquatics Championships =

- Flag of Mongolia
- FINA code: MGL
- National federation: Mongolian Amateur Swimming Federation
- Website: masf.mn

in Fukuoka, Japan
- Competitors: 4 in 1 sport
- Medals: Gold 0 Silver 0 Bronze 0 Total 0

World Aquatics Championships appearances
- 1973; 1975; 1978; 1982; 1986; 1991; 1994; 1998; 2001; 2003; 2005; 2007; 2009; 2011; 2013; 2015; 2017; 2019; 2022; 2023; 2024

Mongolia is set to compete at the 2023 World Aquatics Championships in Fukuoka, Japan from 14 to 30 July.

== Swimming ==
Mongolia entered 4 swimmers.

Men

Athlete	Event	Heat		Semifinal		Final	
Athlete	Event	Time	Rank	Time	Rank	Time	Rank
Batbayar Enkhtamir	50 metre freestyle	24.37	76	Did not advance			
Batbayar Enkhtamir	100 metre freestyle	51.96	70	Did not advance			
Enkhtur Erkhes	50 metre backstroke	26.94	47	Did not advance			
Enkhtur Erkhes	100 metre backstroke	Disqualified		Did not advance			

Women

Athlete	Event	Heat		Semifinal		Final	
Athlete	Event	Time	Rank	Time	Rank	Time	Rank
Batbayar Enkhkhuslen	200 metre freestyle	2:02.49	40	Did not advance			
Batbayar Enkhkhuslen	400 metre freestyle	4:21.39	33	—		Did not advance	
Ariuntamir Enkh-Amgalan	50 metre backstroke	32.54	53	Did not advance			
Ariuntamir Enkh-Amgalan	100 metre backstroke	1:08.59	53	Did not advance			

Mixed

Athlete	Event	Heat		Final	
Athlete	Event	Time	Rank	Time	Rank
Ariuntamir Enkh-Amgalan; Batbayar Enkhtamir; Enkhtur Erkhes; Batbayar Enkhkhuslen	4 × 100 m medley relay	4:10.45	29	Did not advance	
