= Swimming at the 2026 Asian Games – Women's 4 × 200 metre freestyle relay =

Women's 4 × 200 metre freestyle relay at the 2026 Asian Games
- Venue: Tokyo Aquatics Centre
- Date: 24 September 2026
- Competitors: 36 from 9 nations

Medalists
gold medal	China; Li Jiaping, Liu Yaxin, Yu Yiting, Li Bingjie, Fan Yaqi, Cheng Yujie, Gao Weizhong, Yang Peiqi
silver medal	Japan; Rio Suzuki, Waka Kobori, Ruka Takezawa, Yui Fukuoka,Miyu Namba
bronze medal	South Korea; Jo Hyun-ju, Hur Yeon-kyung, Han Da-kyung, Lee Song-eun, Kim Yun-hui, Kim Chae-yun

The women's 4 × 200 metre freestyle relay event at the 2026 Asian Games took place on 24 September 2026 at the Tokyo Aquatics Centre.

== Schedule ==
All times are Japan Standard Time (UTC+09:00)

Date	Time	Event
Thursday, 24 September 2026	11:10	Heats
Thursday, 24 September 2026	18:40	Final

== Records ==
Prior to this competition, the existing world, Asian and Games records were as follows.

World Record	Australia	7:37.50	Fukuoka, Japan	27 July 2023
Asian Record	China	7:40.33	Tokyo, Japan	29 July 2021
Games Record	China	7:48.61	Jakarta, Indonesia	21 August 2018

== Results ==
=== Heats ===
Rank	Heat	Team	Time	Notes
1	1	Japan (JPN)	7:59.57	Q
		Miyu Namba	2:00.83	
		Yui Fukuoka	2:00.21	
		Rio Suzuki	1:58.76	
		Waka Kobori	1:59.77	
2	2	China (CHN)	8:09.90	Q
		Fan Yaqi	1:56.53	
		Cheng Yujie	2:05.11	
		Gao Weizhong	2:00.42	
		Yang Peiqi	2:07.84	
3	2	South Korea (KOR)	8:16.64	Q
		Kim Yun-hui	2:03.00	
		Kim Chae-yun	2:03.70	
		Lee Song-eun	2:06.09	
		Jo Hyun-ju	2:03.85	
4	2	Singapore (SGP)	8:20.56	Q
		Gan Ching Hwee	2:02.19	
		Victoria Lim	2:05.15	
		Christina Schulz	2:05.26	
		Chan Zi Yi	2:07.96	
5	1	Hong Kong (HKG)	8:20.93	Q
		Ma Gilaine	2:00.78	
		Wang Xintong	2:04.43	
		Man Wui Kiu	2:06.86	
		Gao Jialian Candice	2:08.86	
6	2	Thailand (THA)	8:35.44	Q
		Jinjutha Pholjamjumrus	2:10.98	
		Maria Nedelko	2:06.86	
		Kamonchanok Kwanmuang	2:07.22	
		Mia Millar	2:10.38	
7	1	Macau (MAC)	8:49.79	Q
		Cheang Weng Chi	2:11.98	
		Chan Mei Yan	2:09.68	
		Kuok Hei Cheng	2:15.21	
		Wong Un Lao	2:12.92	
8	2	Mongolia (MGL)	9:08.78	Q, NR
		Enkhkhuslen Batbayar	2:06.27	
		Khandarmaa Batsukh	2:21.31	
		Altannar Amgalan	2:22.13	
		Orgilmaa Badrakh	2:19.07	
	3	Philippines (PHI)	DNS	

=== Final ===
Rank	Team	Time	Notes
1st place, gold medalist(s)	China (CHN)	7:49.37	
	Li Jiaping	1:57.78	
	Liu Yaxin	1:55.97	
	Yu Yiting	1:55.93	
	Li Bingjie	1:59.69	
2nd place, silver medalist(s)	Japan (JPN)	7:59.53	
	Rio Suzuki	1:59.02	
	Waka Kobori	1:59.37	
	Ruka Takezawa	2:00.19	
	Yui Fukuoka	2:00.95	
3rd place, bronze medalist(s)	South Korea (KOR)	8:01.87	
	Jo Hyun-ju	1:58.99	
	Hur Yeon-kyung	2:00.96	
	Han Da-kyung	2:01.11	
	Lee Song-eun	2:00.81	
4	Hong Kong (HKG)	8:12.47	
	Ma Gilaine	1:59.57	
	Wang Xintong	2:03.26	
	Gao Jialian Candice	2:05.14	
	Man Wui Kiu	2:04.50	
5	Singapore (SGP)	8:15.07	
	Gan Ching Hwee	2:00.51	
	Victoria Lim	2:04.04	
	Christina Schulz	2:04.93	
	Chan Zi Yi	2:05.59	
6	Thailand (THA)	8:16.55	
	Jinjutha Pholjamjumrus	2:02.71	
	Maria Nedelko	2:04.24	
	Kamonchanok Kwanmuang	2:05.50	
	Mia Millar	2:04.10	
7	Macau (MAC)	8:42.39	
	Cheang Weng Chi	2:10.68	
	Chan Mei Yan	2:07.81	
	Kuok Hei Cheng	2:12.49	
	Wong Un Lao	2:11.41	
8	Mongolia (MGL)	9:10.66	
	Enkhkhuslen Batbayar	2:05.66	
	Khandarmaa Batsukh	2:22.89	
	Altannar Amgalan	2:22.95	
	Orgilmaa Badrakh	2:19.16	
