= Swimming at the 2022 Asian Games – Women's 50 metre freestyle =

Women's 50 metre freestyle at the 2022 Asian Games
- Venue: Hangzhou Olympic Expo Aquatics Center
- Date: 28 September 2023
- Competitors: 32 from 22 nations

Medalists
gold medal	Zhang Yufei	China
silver medal	Siobhán Haughey	Hong Kong
bronze medal	Cheng Yujie	China

The Women's 50 metre freestyle event at the 2022 Asian Games took place on 28 September 2023 at the Hangzhou Olympic Expo Center.

== Schedule ==
All times are China Standard Time (UTC+08:00)

Date	Time	Event
Thursday, 28 September 2023	10:00	Heats
Thursday, 28 September 2023	19:30	Final

== Records ==
Prior to this competition, the existing world, Asian and Games records were as follows.

World Record	Sarah Sjöström (SWE)	23.61	Fukuoka, Japan	29 July 2023
Asian Record	Liu Xiang (CHN)	23.97	Xi'an, China	26 September 2021
Games Record	Rikako Ikee (JPN)	24.53	Jakarta, Indonesia	24 August 2018

== Results ==
=== Heats ===
Rank	Heat	Athlete	Time	Notes
1	4	Zhang Yufei (CHN)	24.50	GR
2	2	Siobhán Haughey (HKG)	24.94	
3	2	Quah Ting Wen (SGP)	25.26	
3	4	Amanda Lim (SGP)	25.26	
5	3	Cheng Yujie (CHN)	25.36	
6	2	Jeong So-eun (KOR)	25.46	
7	3	Tam Hoi Lam (HKG)	25.61	
8	2	Huang Mei-chien (TPE)	25.63	
9	2	Chihiro Igarashi (JPN)	25.65	
10	4	Rikako Ikee (JPN)	25.68	
11	4	Jenjira Srisa-ard (THA)	25.74	
12	3	Kayla Sanchez (PHI)	25.79	
13	3	Jasmine Al-Khaldi (PHI)	26.20	
14	4	Sofia Spodarenko (KAZ)	26.51	
15	3	Phạm Thị Vân (VIE)	26.64	
16	4	Nguyễn Thuý Hiền (VIE)	26.71	
17	2	Pak Mi-song (PRK)	26.87	
18	2	Shivangi Sarma (IND)	26.92	
19	3	Batbayaryn Enkhkhüslen (MGL)	26.98	
20	3	Kornkarnjana Sapianchai (THA)	27.10	
21	4	Kuok Hei Cheng (MAC)	27.50	
22	4	Ri Hye-gyong (PRK)	28.73	
23	1	Southada Daviau (LAO)	28.95	
24	3	Üüriintsolmongiin Nandin-Erdene (MGL)	28.99	
25	1	Ekaterina Bordachyova (TJK)	29.13	
26	1	Anushiya Tandukar (NEP)	29.53	
27	1	Sonia Khatun (BAN)	30.11	
28	1	Meral Ayn Latheef (MDV)	30.49	
29	2	Mahra Al-Shehhi (UAE)	30.66	
30	1	Ameena Ameer Qadri (PAK)	30.69	
31	1	Hamna Ahmed (MDV)	31.11	
32	1	Imelda Ximenes Belo (TLS)	32.57	

=== Final ===
Rank	Athlete	Time	Notes
1st place, gold medalist(s)	Zhang Yufei (CHN)	24.26	GR
2nd place, silver medalist(s)	Siobhán Haughey (HKG)	24.34	
3rd place, bronze medalist(s)	Cheng Yujie (CHN)	24.60	
4	Amanda Lim (SGP)	25.07	
5	Quah Ting Wen (SGP)	25.09	
6	Tam Hoi Lam (HKG)	25.55	
7	Jeong So-eun (KOR)	25.69	
8	Huang Mei-chien (TPE)	25.70	
