= Swimming at the 2022 Asian Games – Women's 100 metre freestyle =

Women's 100 metre freestyle at the 2022 Asian Games
- Venue: Hangzhou Olympic Expo Aquatics Center
- Date: 26 September 2023
- Competitors: 30 from 19 nations

Medalists
gold medal	Siobhán Haughey	Hong Kong
silver medal	Yang Junxuan	China
bronze medal	Cheng Yujie	China

The women's 100 metre freestyle event at the 2022 Asian Games took place on 26 September 2023 at the Hangzhou Olympic Expo Center.

== Schedule ==
All times are China Standard Time (UTC+08:00)

Date	Time	Event
Tuesday, 26 September 2023	10:00	Heats
Tuesday, 26 September 2023	19:30	Final

== Records ==
Prior to this competition, the existing world, Asian and Games records were as follows.

World Record	Sarah Sjöström (SWE)	51.71	Budapest, Hungary	23 July 2017
Asian Record	Siobhán Haughey (HKG)	52.27	Tokyo, Japan	30 July 2021
Games Record	Rikako Ikee (JPN)	53.27	Jakarta, Indonesia	20 August 2018

== Results ==
Legend

- DNS — Did not start

=== Heats ===
Rank	Heat	Athlete	Time	Notes
1	4	Siobhán Haughey (HKG)	54.27	
2	4	Yang Junxuan (CHN)	54.52	
3	2	Kayla Sanchez (PHI)	54.70	
4	3	Cheng Yujie (CHN)	54.72	
5	2	Nagisa Ikemoto (JPN)	55.02	
6	4	Hur Yeon-kyung (KOR)	55.24	
7	3	Tam Hoi Lam (HKG)	55.80	
8	4	Quah Ting Wen (SGP)	55.92	
9	2	Jeong So-eun (KOR)	56.33	
10	2	Amanda Lim (SGP)	56.35	
11	3	Sofia Spodarenko (KAZ)	57.16	
12	3	Batbayaryn Enkhkhüslen (MGL)	57.20	
13	3	Jasmine Al-Khaldi (PHI)	57.47	
14	4	Kamonchanok Kwanmuang (THA)	57.89	
15	4	Nguyễn Thuý Hiền (VIE)	58.01	
16	2	Phạm Thị Vân (VIE)	58.18	
17	4	Shivangi Sarma (IND)	58.31	
18	3	Pak Mi-song (PRK)	58.79	
18	2	Kornkarnjana Sapianchai (THA)	58.79	
20	1	Valerie Tarazi (PLE)	59.27	
21	2	Chen Pui Lam (MAC)	59.58	
22	4	Kuok Hei Cheng (MAC)	1:01.19	
23	2	Jehanara Nabi (PAK)	1:02.39	
24	1	Makelyta Singsombath (LAO)	1:03.13	
25	1	Anushiya Tandukar (NEP)	1:03.17	
26	1	Batkhongoryn Yalguun (MGL)	1:03.51	
27	3	Mahra Al-Shehhi (UAE)	1:05.77	
28	1	Southada Daviau (LAO)	1:08.50	
29	1	Imelda Ximenes Belo (TLS)	1:12.16	
—	3	Rikako Ikee (JPN)	DNS	

=== Final ===
Rank	Athlete	Time	Notes
1st place, gold medalist(s)	Siobhán Haughey (HKG)	52.17	AR
2nd place, silver medalist(s)	Yang Junxuan (CHN)	53.11	
3rd place, bronze medalist(s)	Cheng Yujie (CHN)	53.91	
4	Nagisa Ikemoto (JPN)	54.27	
5	Kayla Sanchez (PHI)	54.69	
6	Hur Yeon-kyung (KOR)	54.70	
7	Quah Ting Wen (SGP)	55.38	
8	Tam Hoi Lam (HKG)	55.74	
