= Swimming at the 2026 Asian Games – Women's 200 metre freestyle =

Women's 200 metre freestyle at the 2026 Asian Games
- Venue: Tokyo Aquatics Centre
- Date: 21 September 2026
- Competitors: 22 from 13 nations

Medalists
gold medal	Siobhan Haughey	Hong Kong
silver medal	Li Jiaping	China
bronze medal	Liu Yaxin	China

The women's 200 metre freestyle event at the 2026 Asian Games took place on 21 September 2026 at the Tokyo Aquatics Centre. Hong Kong's Siobhan Haughey, the reigning champion, successfully defended her title in a time of 1:54.96, finishing more than a second ahead of China's Li Jiaping, who won the silver medal.

== Schedule ==
All times are Japan Standard Time (UTC+09:00)

Date	Time	Event
Monday, 21 September 2026	10:24	Heats
Monday, 21 September 2026	17:17	Final

== Records ==
Prior to this competition, the existing world, Asian and Games records were as follows.

World Record	Ariarne Titmus (AUS)	1:52.23	Brisbane, Australia	12 June 2024
Asian Record	Siobhan Haughey (HKG)	1:53.92	Tokyo, Japan	28 July 2021
Games Record	Siobhan Haughey (HKG)	1:54.12	Hangzhou, China	25 September 2023

== Results ==
=== Heats ===
Rank	Heat	Athlete	Time	Notes
1	2	Li Jiaping (CHN)	1:58.50	Q
2	3	Siobhan Haughey (HKG)	1:58.60	Q
3	2	Gilaine Ma (HKG)	2:00.57	Q
4	2	Ruka Takezawa (JPN)	2:01.29	Q
5	1	Liu Yaxin (CHN)	2:01.40	Q
6	1	Nagisa Ikemoto (JPN)	2:01.83	Q
7	3	Jo Hyun-ju (KOR)	2:02.45	Q
8	1	Jinjutha Pholjamjumrus (THA)	2:02.64	Q
9	1	Victoria Lim (SGP)	2:03.72	Q
10	3	Maria Nedelko (THA)	2:04.21	Q
11	2	Adelia Chantika Aulia (INA)	2:04.92	Reserve
12	1	Aiymkyz Aidaralieva (KGZ)	2:05.23	Reserve, NR
13	3	Enkhkhuslen Batbayar (MGL)	2:06.04	
14	3	Christina Schulz (SGP)	2:06.97	
15	1	Sana Lefalher (BRN)	2:10.88	
16	3	Yalindi Minagi Rupesinghe (SRI)	2:12.20	
17	2	Asma Lefalher (BRN)	2:12.21	
18	1	Farah Fares (PLE)	2:13.69	NR
19	2	Duana Lama (NEP)	2:15.40	
20	3	Orgilmaa Badrakh (MGL)	2:17.37	
21	3	Yasmine Alsabih (KUW)	2:18.71	
	2	Heather White (PHI)	DNS	

=== Final ===
Rank	Athlete	Time	Notes
1st place, gold medalist(s)	Siobhan Haughey (HKG)	1:54.96	
2nd place, silver medalist(s)	Li Jiaping (CHN)	1:56.58	
3rd place, bronze medalist(s)	Liu Yaxin (CHN)	1:57.53	
4	Jo Hyun-ju (KOR)	1:59.29	
5	Gilaine Ma (HKG)	1:59.75	
6	Ruka Takezawa (JPN)	2:00.00	
7	Nagisa Ikemoto (JPN)	2:00.61	
8	Jinjutha Pholjamjumrus (THA)	2:03.13	
9	Maria Nedelko (THA)	2:03.24	
10	Victoria Lim (SGP)	2:04.43	
