= Swimming at the 2026 Asian Games – Women's 4 × 100 metre freestyle relay =

Women's 4 × 100 metre freestyle relay at the 2026 Asian Games
- Venue: Tokyo Aquatics Centre
- Date: 20 September 2026
- Competitors: 50 from 10 nations

Medalists
gold medal	China; Yu Yiting, Zhang Yufei, Cheng Yujie, Wu Qingfeng, Fan Yaqi, Li Jiaping, Liu Yaxin, Li Bingjie
silver medal	Hong Kong; Gilaine Ma, Siobhan Haughey, Li Sum Yiu, Natalie Kan, Wang Xintong
bronze medal	Japan; Ayu Mizoguchi, Rio Suzuki, Nagisa Ikemoto, Shiho Matsumoto, Yui Fukuoka, Miyu Namba

The women's 4 × 100 metre freestyle relay event at the 2026 Asian Games took place on 20 September 2026 at the Tokyo Aquatics Centre.

== Schedule ==
All times are Japan Standard Time (UTC+09:00)

Date	Time	Event
Sunday, 20 September 2026	11:11	Heats
Sunday, 20 September 2026	18:33	Final

== Records ==
Prior to this competition, the existing world, Asian and Games records were as follows.

World Record	Australia	3:27.96	Fukuoka, Japan	23 July 2023
Asian Record	China	3:30.30	Paris, France	27 July 2024
Games Record	China	3:33.96	Hangzhou, China	24 September 2023

== Results ==
=== Heats ===
Rank	Heat	Team	Time	Notes
1	2	China (CHN)	3:37.70	Q
		Fan Yaqi	54.37	
		Li Jiaping	54.78	
		Liu Yaxin	54.09	
		Li Bingjie	54.46	
2	2	Japan (JPN)	3:41.32	Q
		Rio Suzuki	55.14	
		Ayu Mizoguchi	54.72	
		Yui Fukuoka	55.83	
		Miyu Namba	55.63	
3	2	South Korea (KOR)	3:45.36	Q
		Han Da-kyung	56.82	
		Lee Hee-eun	58.35	
		Lee Song-eun	54.98	
		Hur Yeon-kyung	55.21	
4	1	Hong Kong (HKG)	3:45.39	Q
		Gilaine Ma	55.54	
		Wang Xintong	57.19	
		Li Sum Yiu	57.39	
		Natalie Kan	55.27	
5	1	Philippines (PHI)	3:45.73	Q
		Teia Salvino	57.45	
		Heather White	57.11	
		Xiandi Chua	57.52	
		Kayla Sanchez	53.65	
6	1	Thailand (THA)	3:50.96	Q
		Mia Millar	57.74	
		Ploy Leelayana	57.04	
		Varissara Nopthong	59.67	
		Maria Nedelko	56.51	
7	2	Singapore (SGP)	3:54.74	Q
		Victoria Lim	57.89	
		Megan Yo	58.16	
		Kayley Goh	1:00.45	
		Christina Schulz	58.24	
8	1	Macau (MAC)	3:56.83	Q
		Wong Un Lao	59.18	
		Chan Mei Yan	59.06	
		Cheang Weng Chi	58.95	
		Chen Pui Lam	59.64	
9	1	Bahrain (BRN)	4:05.43	Reserve
		Asma Lefalher	1:00.10	
		Amani Alobaidli	1:00.23	
		Noor Taha	1:03.16	
		Sana Lefalher	1:01.94	
10	2	Mongolia (MGL)	4:05.81	Reserve, NR
		Enkhkhuslen Batbayar	57.92	
		Enerelen Gurdavaa	1:02.43	
		Orgilmaa Badrakh	1:03.14	
		Maral Batsanal	1:02.32	

=== Final ===
Rank	Team	Time	Notes
1st place, gold medalist(s)	China (CHN)	3:33.10	GR
	Yu Yiting	53.39	
	Zhang Yufei	52.99	
	Cheng Yujie	53.79	
	Wu Qingfeng	52.93	
2nd place, silver medalist(s)	Hong Kong (HKG)	3:36.59	
	Gilaine Ma	54.95	
	Siobhan Haughey	52.22	
	Li Sum Yiu	54.51	
	Natalie Kan	54.91	
3rd place, bronze medalist(s)	Japan (JPN)	3:39.09	
	Ayu Mizoguchi	55.03	
	Rio Suzuki	55.04	
	Nagisa Ikemoto	54.47	
	Shiho Matsumoto	54.55	
4	South Korea (KOR)	3:40.26	NR
	Lee Song-eun	54.81	
	Jo Hyun-ju	54.85	
	Hur Yeon-kyung	54.31	
	Kim Yun-hui	56.29	
5	Thailand (THA)	3:49.81	
	Maria Nedelko	56.59	
	Ploy Leelayana	57.81	
	Varissara Nopthong	58.56	
	Mia Millar	56.85	
6	Singapore (SGP)	3:51.62	
	Victoria Lim	58.06	
	Megan Yo	57.61	
	Christina Schulz	57.96	
	Zi Yi Chan	57.99	
7	Macau (MAC)	3:54.27	
	Wong Un Lao	58.42	
	Chan Mei Yan	57.95	
	Cheang Weng Chi	58.95	
	Chen Pui Lam	58.95	
-	Philippines (PHI)	DSQ	
	Kayla Sanchez	53.68	
	Heather White	55.50	
	Xiandi Chua	56.54	
	Teia Salvino	—	
