= Wu Qingfeng =

Wu Qingfeng may refer to:

- Wu Tsing-fong (born 1982), or Wu Qingfeng, Taiwanese singer-songwriter
- Wu Qingfeng (swimmer) (born 2003), Chinese swimmer
