= Yui Fukuoka =

Japanese swimmer (born 2007)

Personal information
- Nationality: Japanese
- Born: 15 September 2007 (age 19)
- Education: Chuo University

Sport
- Sport: Swimming
- Strokes: Freestyle
- Club: Itoman Swimming School Tama
Medal record
Women's swimming
Representing Japan
Asian Games
Silver medal – second place	2026 Aichi–Nagoya	4×200 m freestyle
Bronze medal – third place	2026 Aichi–Nagoya	4×100 m freestyle
World Junior Championships
Gold medal – first place	2025 Otopeni	4×100 m mixed medley

Yui Fukuoka (Japanese: 福岡由唯; born 15 September 2007) is a Japanese competitive swimmer who specialises in freestyle events. She represents Chuo University and Itoman Swimming School Tama. At the 2026 Asian Games, she won silver in the women's 4 × 200 metre freestyle relay and bronze in the women's 4 × 100 metre freestyle relay.

== Career ==
Fukuoka attended Musashino High School before enrolling at Chuo University, where she joined the university's swimming team. She also trained with Itoman Swimming School Tama. Her main events are freestyle races, including the 100, 200 and 400 metres.

In 2025, Fukuoka represented Japan at the World Aquatics Junior Swimming Championships in Otopeni, Romania. She competed in freestyle and relay events as part of the Japanese junior national team.

At the 2025 Japan National Championships in short-course swimming, Fukuoka recorded a time of 1:55.89 in the women's 200 metre freestyle. She also recorded personal-best times in the 50, 100 and 400 metre freestyle events at the 2026 Japan Junior Olympic Cup short-course championships.

In 2026, Fukuoka was selected for Japan's swimming team at the 2026 Asian Games in Aichi and Nagoya as a relay specialist. She competed in the women's 4 × 200 metre freestyle relay, helping Japan win the silver medal. She was also part of the Japanese team that won bronze in the women's 4 × 100 metre freestyle relay.
