= Swimming at the 2026 Asian Games – Women's 50 metre freestyle =

Women's 50 metre freestyle at the 2026 Asian Games
- Venue: Tokyo Aquatics Centre
- Date: 24 September 2026
- Competitors: 36 from 26 nations

Medalists
gold medal	Wu Qingfeng	China
silver medal	Siobhan Haughey	Hong Kong
bronze medal	Cheng Yujie	China

The women's 50 metre freestyle event at the 2026 Asian Games took place on 24 September 2026 at the Tokyo Aquatics Centre. China's Wu Qingfeng won the gold medal in an Asian Games record of 23.98 seconds, while Hong Kong's Siobhan Haughey won the silver medal in 24.32 seconds.

== Schedule ==
All times are Japan Standard Time (UTC+09:00)

Date	Time	Event
Thursday, 24 September 2026	10:00	Heats
Thursday, 24 September 2026	17:00	Final

== Records ==
Prior to this competition, the existing world, Asian and Games records were as follows.

World Record	Kate Douglass (USA)	23.19	Irvine, United States	15 August 2026
Asian Record	Liu Xiang (CHN)	23.97	Xi'an, China	26 September 2021
Games Record	Wu Qingfeng (CHN)	23.98	Tokyo, Japan	24 September 2026

== Results ==
=== Heats ===
Rank	Heat	Athlete	Time	Notes
1	4	Wu Qingfeng (CHN)	24.33	Q
2	3	Siobhan Haughey (HKG)	24.70	Q
3	4	Amanda Lim (SGP)	24.92	Q
4	2	Cheng Yujie (CHN)	24.95	Q
5	4	Kayla Sanchez (PHI)	24.97	Q
6	2	Ayu Mizoguchi (JPN)	25.09	Q
7	3	Li Sum Yiu (HKG)	25.31	Q
8	2	Yeo Chiok Sze (SGP)	25.33	Q
9	3	Nadia Aisha Nurazmi (INA)	25.62	Q, NR
10	2	Liu Pei-yin (TPE)	25.64	Q
11	3	Hur Yeon-kyung (KOR)	25.68	Reserve
12	4	Heather White (PHI)	25.90	Reserve
13	2	Chiu Yi-chen (TPE)	26.03	
14	3	Sofia Spodarenko (KAZ)	26.24	
15	4	Nguyễn Thủy (VIE)	26.37	
16	4	Adelia Chantika Aulia (INA)	26.39	
17	3	Ploy Leelayana (THA)	26.56	
18	2	Sofiya Abubakirova (KAZ)	26.72	
19	4	Kuok Hei Cheng (MAC)	27.23	
20	2	Aiymkyz Aidaralieva (KGZ)	27.28	
21	4	Amani Alobaidli (BRN)	27.40	
22	2	Haley Rose Sakbun (CAM)	27.89	
23	3	Enerelen Gurdavaa (MGL)	28.24	
24	3	Maya Khalil (PLE)	28.34	
25	4	Khandarmaa Batsukh (MGL)	28.57	
26	4	Marina Abushamaleh (PLE)	28.79	
27	2	Meral Latheef (MDV)	28.88	
28	1	Valeriya Mirenskaya (TKM)	29.11	
29	1	Tamsiri Niyomxay (LAO)	29.80	
30	1	Mishael Aisha Hyat Ayub (PAK)	30.04	
31	2	Jana Hussain (KUW)	30.27	
32	3	Mona Alfarsi (KUW)	31.22	
33	1	Sofiyakhon Gazieva (TJK)	32.50	
34	1	Emiliya Khalikova (TJK)	33.32	
35	1	Salena Marlin (TLS)	37.85	
	3	Rikako Ikee (JPN)	DNS	

=== Final ===
Rank	Athlete	Time	Notes
1st place, gold medalist(s)	Wu Qingfeng (CHN)	23.98	GR
2nd place, silver medalist(s)	Siobhan Haughey (HKG)	24.32	
3rd place, bronze medalist(s)	Cheng Yujie (CHN)	24.46	
4	Kayla Sanchez (PHI)	24.75	
5	Amanda Lim (SGP)	24.79	
6	Li Sum Yiu (HKG)	25.11	
7	Yeo Chiok Sze (SGP)	25.24	
8	Ayu Mizoguchi (JPN)	25.25	
9	Liu Pei-yin (TPE)	25.64	
10	Nadia Aisha Nurazmi (INA)	25.66	
