= Laura Littlejohn =

New Zealand swimmer

Personal information
- Nationality: New Zealand
- Born: 12 July 2004 (age 21) Hamilton

Sport
- Sport: Swimming
- Strokes: Freestyle
- Club: St Pauls Swim Club
- College team: University of Tennessee
- Coach: Graham Smith / Matt Kredich

Laura Littlejohn (born 12 July 2004) is a New Zealand swimmer who competed at the 2021 and 2022 World Championships.

She is from Hamilton, New Zealand and was educated at St Paul’s Collegiate school. She has two siblings that have also represented New Zealand, Ben Littlejohn (swimmer) and Kate Littlejohn (rowing).

== Swimming Career ==
=== 2021 World championships ===
Littlejohn made her senior debut at the 2021 FINA World Swimming Championships (25 m) in Abu Dhabi. Her highest place finish was 18th in the 100 metre freestyle in a time of 53.96. She was also 20th in the 100 metre individual medley in a time of 1:00.43, and 24th in the 200 metre freestyle in a time of 1:59.67.

=== 2022 World championships ===
Littlejohn competed the 2022 World Aquatics Championships held in Budapest, Hungary. She did not start in the 100 metre freestyle, her only individual event, but was part of the 4x100 metre freestyle mixed relay team alongside Lewis Clareburt, Carter Swift and Chelsey Edwards that finished ninth, just outside the final, setting a new national record in the process. Littlejohn was also part of the 4x200 metre freestyle relay team alongside Erika Fairweather, Eve Thomas and Caitlin Deans that also finished ninth.

=== 2022 Junior Pan Pacific championships ===
At the 2022 Junior Pan Pacific Swimming Championships held in Honolulu, Hawaii Littlejohn finished fifth in the 50 metre freestyle, in a time of 25.90 and sixth in the 100 metre freestyle in a time of 55.60. She also took part in a number of team relays during the meet.

She currently studies at the University of Tennessee.
