= Miyu Namba =

Japanese swimmer (born 2002)

Personal information
- Nationality: Japanese
- Born: 31 May 2002 (age 24) Nara, Japan
- Height: 1.68 m (5 ft 6 in)

Sport
- Sport: Swimming
- Strokes: Freestyle
Medal record
Women's swimming
Representing Japan
World Championships (SC)
Silver medal – second place	2022 Melbourne	1500 m freestyle
Bronze medal – third place	2022 Melbourne	800 m freestyle
Asian Games
Silver medal – second place	2022 Hangzhou	4×200 m freestyle
Silver medal – second place	2026 Aichi–Nagoya	4×200 m freestyle
Bronze medal – third place	2026 Aichi–Nagoya	4×100 m freestyle
World Junior Championships
Silver medal – second place	2019 Budapest	800 m freestyle
Junior Pan Pacific Championships
Bronze medal – third place	2018 Suva	4×200 m freestyle

Miyu Namba (難波 実夢, Nanba Miyu; born 31 May 2002) is a Japanese swimmer.

At the Tokyo event of the 2018 FINA Swimming World Cup, Namba won a silver medal in the Women's 400m freestyle, and a bronze medal in the 800m freestyle. In the 2019 World Cup, she took bronze in the 400m freestyle. She placed second in the 800m freestyle at the 2019 FINA World Junior Swimming Championships.

In April 2021, Namba qualified to represent Japan at the 400m freestyle and 800m freestyle at the 2020 Summer Olympics. In the 400m freestyle qualifying competition, Namba was ahead of the field for most of the race, but lost to Waka Kobori with a time of 4:06.36 against Kobori's 4:06.34. Namba won the 800m freestyle qualifying final in 8:26.61, with Kobori second with 8:26.67.

At the 2020 Summer Olympics, Namba finished 20th in the 400m freestyle with a time of 4:13.49, and 17th in the 800m freestyle at 8:32.04, and did not qualify for either final.
