= Rio Suzuki (swimmer) =

Japanese swimmer (born 2005)

Personal information
- Nationality: Japanese
- Born: September 14, 2005 (age 21)
- Education: Aoyama Gakuin University

Sport
- Sport: Swimming
- Strokes: Freestyle
- Club: Arena Tsukimino Sports Club
Medal record
Women's swimming
Representing Japan
Asian Games
Silver medal – second place	2026 Aichi–Nagoya	4×200 m freestyle
Bronze medal – third place	2026 Aichi–Nagoya	4×100 m freestyle
Summer World University Games
Silver medal – second place	2025 Rhine-Ruhr	4×100 m mixed freestyle
Bronze medal – third place	2025 Rhine-Ruhr	4×200 m freestyle

Rio Suzuki (Japanese: 鈴木莉緒; born 14 September 2005) is a Japanese competitive swimmer who specialises in freestyle. She represents Aoyama Gakuin University and Arena Tsukimino Sports Club. She won silver in the mixed 4 × 100 metre medley relay at the 2025 Summer World University Games and silver and bronze medals in women's freestyle relays at the 2026 Asian Games.

== Career ==
Suzuki attended Hachioji Gakuen Hachioji High School before enrolling at Aoyama Gakuin University, where she studies education. She competes in freestyle events, particularly the 50 and 100 metre distances, and represents the university in intercollegiate swimming competitions.

In September 2025, Suzuki won the women's 100 metre freestyle at the Japan Intercollegiate Swimming Championships, setting a personal best. She also competed for Japan at the 2025 Summer World University Games in Germany. At the competition, she was part of the Japanese mixed 4 × 100 metre medley relay team that won the silver medal.

In June 2026, Suzuki won the women's 200 metre freestyle at the Japan Swimming Championships and finished second in the 100 metre freestyle. These performances contributed to her selection for Japan's team at the 2026 Asian Games and the Pan Pacific Swimming Championships.

At the 2026 Asian Games in Aichi–Nagoya, Suzuki won two medals in relay events. She helped Japan finish second in the women's 4 × 200 metre freestyle relay, earning silver, and third in the women's 4 × 100 metre freestyle relay, earning bronze.
