= Swimming at the 2025 Summer World University Games – Mixed 4 × 100 metre freestyle relay =

Mixed 4 × 100 metre freestyle relay at the 2025 Summer World University Games
- Venue: Schwimm- und Sprunghalle im Europasportpark
- Location: Berlin
- Dates: 21 July (heats and final)
- Nations: 21

Medalists
gold medal	Matthew King; David King; Isabel Ivey; Maxine Parker; Julia Dennis; Caroline Larsen; Owen McDonald; Mitchell Schott	United States
silver medal	Takumi Mori; Takaki Hara; Ayu Mizoguchi; Rio Suzuki; Sakura Ohshima; Yuta Watanabe; Konosuke Yanagimoto	Japan
bronze medal	Guy Brooks; Ruard van Renen; Olivia Nel; Michaela de Villiers; Owethu Mahan; Georgia Nel	South Africa

The mixed 4 × 100 metre freestyle relay at the 2025 Summer World University Games in Rhine-Ruhr, Germany was held 21 July 2025. United States won the gold medal, Japan took the silver medal and South Africa earned the bronze medal.

== Schedule ==
All times are Central European Time (UTC+1)

Date	Time	Round
21 July	10:38	Heats
21 July	21:07	Final

== Records ==
Prior to the competition, the world and Universiade records were as follows.

Category	Team	Record	Date	Place	Event
World record	Australia	3:18.83	29 July 2023	Fukuoka, Japan	2023 World Championships
Universiade record	China	3:25.38	5 August 2023	Chengdu, China	2021 Summer World University Games

== Results ==
=== Heats ===
All entered teams competed across multiple seeded heats in the morning session. Teams with the top 8 fastest times advanced, regardless of which individual heat they swam.

Rank	Heat	Lane	Nation	Swimmers	Time	Notes
1	3	4	United States	Owen McDonald (49.48); Mitchell Schott (1:37.53); Caroline Larsen (2:31.94); Julia Dennis (3:26.13)	3:26.13	Q
2	1	2	Japan	Konosuke Yanagimoto (49.23); Yuta Watanabe (1:38.70); Sakura Ohshima (2:34.94); Ayu Mizoguchi (3:30.51)	3:30.51	Q
3	2	4	Italy	Giovanni Guatti (50.09); Luca Serio (1:39.69); Viola Scotto di Carlo (2:34.90); Agata Ambler (3:30.57)	3:30.57	Q
4	2	5	Cyprus	Nikolas Antoniou (49.65); Nikolas Kosta (1:40.59); Kalia Antoniou (2:35.13); Anna Hadjiloizou (3:31.30)	3:31.30	Q
5	3	3	South Africa	Guy Brooks (49.76); Owethu Mahan (1:40.60); Olivia Nel (2:35.20); Georgia Nel (3:31.51)	3:31.51	Q
6	2	3	Poland	Konrad Zieliński (50.64); Michał Pruszyński (1:40.14); Adrianna Szwabińska (2:36.06); Aleksandra Polańska (3:31.88)	3:31.88	Q
7	2	6	Switzerland	Robin Yeboah (50.04); Tiago Behar (1:39.82); Angélique Brugger (2:36.34); Manon Richard (3:32.40)	3:32.40	Q
8	2	7	Portugal	Diogo Lebre (50.36); Anna Fomina (1:46.84); Francisca Martins (2:42.47); Gustavo Carvalhais (3:32.69)	3:32.69	Q
9	3	6	Chinese Taipei	Fan Wen-wei (51.04); Chuang Mu-lun (1:41.53); Liu Pei-yin (2:38.48); Liao Yu-fei (3:35.75)	3:35.75	
10	2	2	Austria	Leon Opatril (51.00); Andreas Rizek (1:41.82); Cornelia Pammer (2:39.69); Fabienne Pavlik (3:37.69)	3:37.69	
11	3	5	South Korea	Kim Min-jun (51.35); Han Seung-yun (1:43.30); Lee Yun-jung (2:41.15); Ju U-yeong (3:37.95)	3:37.95	
12	1	6	Singapore	Sage Tan (51.81); Samuel Tang (1:43.72); Yeo Chiok Sze (2:40.89); Ashley Lim (3:38.94)	3:38.94	
13	3	2	Turkey	Ahmet Burak Işik (52.41); Kerem Carban (1:43.50); Deniz Ertan (2:40.85); Hazal Özkan (3:38.99)	3:38.99	
14	2	1	Slovakia	Jakub Poliačik (51.79); Ondrej Duša (1:43.34); Zora Ripková (2:40.82); Sabína Kupčová (3:39.38)	3:39.38	
15	1	3	Sweden	Erik Falk (50.51); Charlie Skoglund (1:38.97); Moa Bergdahl (2:37.56); Hanna Bergman (3:39.86)	3:39.86	
16	3	1	Slovenia	Jaka Pušnik (52.28); Arne Furlan (1:44.40); Tia Primc (2:42.56); Sara Mihalič (3:40.84)	3:40.84	
17	2	8	India	Jashua Durai (51.20); Nina Venkatesh (1:51.23); Bhavya Sachdeva (2:53.34); Manickar. Beniston (3:45.44)	3:45.44	
18	3	8	Argentina	Agustin Rasche (53.30); Josefina Allport (1:54.65); Aixa Recchioni (2:54.64); Nicolas Retrive (3:46.99)	3:46.99	
19	3	7	Latvia	Staņislavs Šakels (51.44); Kristiāna Maskava-Pudāne (1:54.04); Jegors Mihailovs (2:46.61); Marija Goberga (3:48.90)	3:48.90	
20	1	5	Chile	Elías Ardiles (51.42); Patricio Bobadilla (1:45.35); Fernanda Reyes (2:49.21); Trinidad Ardiles (3:51.59)	3:51.59	
21	1	4	Ecuador	Carlos Castillo (54.65); Kimberly Uyaguari (1:56.18); Martín Álvarez (2:49.71); María Contreras (3:51.60)	3:51.60	

=== Final ===
The fastest 8 teams competed in a single race to determine the gold, silver and bronze medalists.

Rank	Lane	Nation	Swimmers	Time	Notes
1st place, gold medalist(s)	4	United States	Matthew King (48.28); David King (1:36.63); Isabel Ivey (2:30.76); Maxine Parker (3:24.27)	3:24.27	FR
2nd place, silver medalist(s)	5	Japan	Takumi Mori (48.84); Takaki Hara (1:36.97); Ayu Mizoguchi (2:32.24); Rio Suzuki (3:26.86)	3:26.86	
3rd place, bronze medalist(s)	2	South Africa	Guy Brooks (49.55); Ruard van Renen (1:38.75); Olivia Nel (2:33.47); Michaela de Villiers (3:28.51)	3:28.51	
4	3	Italy	Lorenzo Actis Dato (49.31); Giovanni Caserta (1:38.64); Federica Toma (2:33.76); Agata Ambler (3:28.57)	3:28.57	
5	7	Poland	Dominik Dudys (49.47); Kacper Klimczak (1:39.15); Aleksandra Polańska (2:34.98); Julia Maik (3:30.38)	3:30.38	
6	6	Cyprus	Nikolas Antoniou (49.62); Nikolas Kosta (1:40.41); Kalia Antoniou (2:34.88); Anna Hadjiloizou (3:30.73)	3:30.73	
7	8	Portugal	Diogo Lebre (50.28); Gustavo Carvalhais (1:40.06); Anna Fomina (2:36.44); Francisca Martins (3:31.22)	3:31.22	
8	1	Switzerland	Tiago Behar (49.59); Robin Yeboah (1:38.68); Angélique Brugger (2:34.89); Manon Richard (3:31.40)	3:31.40	
