= Mongolia at the 2013 World Aquatics Championships =

- Flag of Mongolia
- FINA code: MGL
- National federation: Mongolian Amateur Swimming Federation

in Barcelona, Spain
- Competitors: 4 in 1 sports
- Medals: Gold 0 Silver 0 Bronze 0 Total 0

World Aquatics Championships appearances
- 1973; 1975; 1978; 1982; 1986; 1991; 1994; 1998; 2001; 2003; 2005; 2007; 2009; 2011; 2013; 2015; 2017; 2019; 2022; 2023; 2024

Mongolia competed at the 2013 World Aquatics Championships in Barcelona, Spain between 19 July and 4 August 2013.

== Swimming ==
Mongolian swimmers achieved qualifying standards in the following events (up to a maximum of 2 swimmers in each event at the A-standard entry time, and 1 at the B-standard):

Men

Athlete	Event	Heat		Semifinal		Final	
Athlete	Event	Time	Rank	Time	Rank	Time	Rank
Erdenemunkh Demuul	50 m backstroke	29.82	42	did not advance			
Erdenemunkh Demuul	100 m backstroke	1:05.18	51	did not advance			
Batsaikhan Dulguun	50 m butterfly	26.20	57	did not advance			
Gunsennorov Zandanbal	100 m freestyle	56.78	75	did not advance			
Gunsennorov Zandanbal	100 m breaststroke	1:11.27	71	did not advance			

Women

Athlete	Event	Heat		Semifinal		Final	
Athlete	Event	Time	Rank	Time	Rank	Time	Rank
Altansukh Nomin	100 m backstroke	1:18.95	51	did not advance			
Altansukh Nomin	50 m breaststroke	37.78	67	did not advance			
