= Liu Yaxin =

Chinese swimmer (born 1999)

Liu Yaxin 柳雅欣
Personal information
- National team: China
- Born: 16 June 1999 (age 27) Lishui, Zhejiang, China
- Height: 1.78 m (5 ft 10 in)
- Weight: 69 kg (152 lb)

Sport
- Sport: Swimming
- Strokes: Backstroke
Medal record
Women's swimming
Representing China
Olympic Games
Bronze medal – third place	2024 Paris	4×200 m freestyle
World Championships (LC)
Bronze medal – third place	2023 Fukuoka	4×200 m freestyle
Bronze medal – third place	2025 Singapore	4×200 m freestyle
World Championships (SC)
Bronze medal – third place	2021 Abu Dhabi	4×200 m freestyle
Asian Games
Gold medal – first place	2018 Jakarta-Palembang	200 m backstroke
Gold medal – first place	2022 Hangzhou	4x100 m freestyle
Gold medal – first place	2022 Hangzhou	4x200 m freestyle
Gold medal – first place	2026 Aichi–Nagoya	4×100 m freestyle
Gold medal – first place	2026 Aichi–Nagoya	4×200 m freestyle
Silver medal – second place	2022 Hangzhou	200 m backstroke
Bronze medal – third place	2022 Hangzhou	200 m freestyle
Bronze medal – third place	2026 Aichi–Nagoya	200 m freestyle
World University Games
Gold medal – first place	2021 Chengdu	200 m freestyle
Gold medal – first place	2021 Chengdu	200 m backstroke
Gold medal – first place	2021 Chengdu	4×100 m freestyle
Gold medal – first place	2021 Chengdu	4×200 m freestyle
Gold medal – first place	2021 Chengdu	4×100 m medley
Gold medal – first place	2021 Chengdu	4×100 m mixed medley

Liu Yaxin (Chinese: 柳雅欣; pinyin: Liǔyǎxīn; born 16 June 1999) is a Chinese competitive swimmer who specializes in backstroke.

She qualified for the 2016 Summer Olympics in Rio de Janeiro in the 200 meter backstroke. She swam the 4th time in the semifinals and reached the final, where she finished 7th.

At the 2015 World Aquatics Championships in Kazan she finished 18th in the 200 meter backstroke.

On 19 August 2018 Liu won the Women's 200M Backstroke at the 2018 Asian Games in Jakarta, Indonesia.
