= Siobhán Haughey =

Hong Kong swimmer (born 1997)

Siobhán Haughey SBS
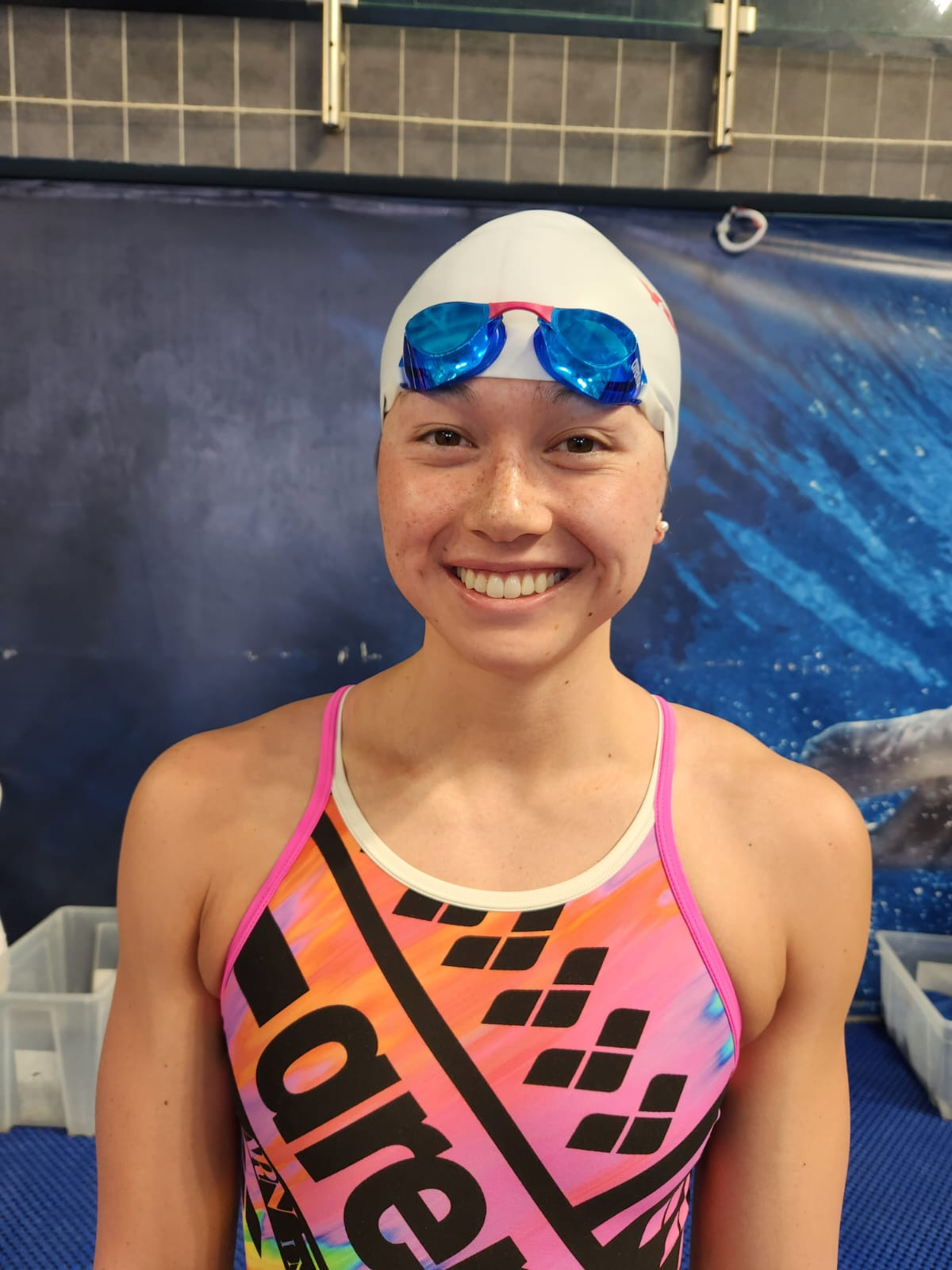
- Haughey in 2023

Personal information
- Native name: 何詩蓓
- National team: Hong Kong
- Born: Siobhán Bernadette Haughey; 31 October 1997 (age 28) Hong Kong
- Height: 1.75 m (5 ft 9 in)
- Weight: 56 kg (123 lb)

Sport
- Sport: Swimming
- Strokes: Freestyle
- Club: Energy Standard International Swim Club; South China Athletic Association (南華體育會)
- College team: University of Michigan
Medal record
Representing Hong Kong
Women's swimming
Olympic Games
Silver medal – second place	2020 Tokyo	100 m freestyle
Silver medal – second place	2020 Tokyo	200 m freestyle
Bronze medal – third place	2024 Paris	100 m freestyle
Bronze medal – third place	2024 Paris	200 m freestyle
World Championships (LC)
Gold medal – first place	2024 Doha	200 m freestyle
Silver medal – second place	2023 Fukuoka	100 m freestyle
Silver medal – second place	2024 Doha	100 m freestyle
Bronze medal – third place	2024 Doha	100 m breaststroke
World Championships (SC)
Gold medal – first place	2021 Abu Dhabi	100 m freestyle
Gold medal – first place	2021 Abu Dhabi	200 m freestyle
Gold medal – first place	2022 Melbourne	200 m freestyle
Gold medal – first place	2024 Budapest	200 m freestyle
Silver medal – second place	2022 Melbourne	100 m freestyle
Bronze medal – third place	2021 Abu Dhabi	400 m freestyle
Asian Games
Gold medal – first place	2022 Hangzhou	100 m freestyle
Gold medal – first place	2022 Hangzhou	200 m freestyle
Gold medal – first place	2026 Aichi–Nagoya	100 m freestyle
Gold medal – first place	2026 Aichi–Nagoya	200 m freestyle
Silver medal – second place	2022 Hangzhou	50 m freestyle
Silver medal – second place	2026 Aichi–Nagoya	50 m freestyle
Silver medal – second place	2026 Aichi–Nagoya	4×100 m freestyle
Bronze medal – third place	2014 Incheon	4×100 m freestyle
Bronze medal – third place	2014 Incheon	4×200 m freestyle
Bronze medal – third place	2014 Incheon	4×100 m medley
Bronze medal – third place	2022 Hangzhou	50 m breaststroke
Bronze medal – third place	2022 Hangzhou	4×100 m freestyle
Bronze medal – third place	2022 Hangzhou	4×100 m medley
East Asian Games
Silver medal – second place	2013 Tianjin	200 m medley
Silver medal – second place	2013 Tianjin	50 m freestyle
Bronze medal – third place	2013 Tianjin	100 m freestyle
Bronze medal – third place	2013 Tianjin	200 m freestyle
Bronze medal – third place	2013 Tianjin	4×100 m freestyle
Bronze medal – third place	2013 Tianjin	4×200 m freestyle
Bronze medal – third place	2013 Tianjin	4×100 m medley
World University Games
Gold medal – first place	2017 Taipei	100 m freestyle
Gold medal – first place	2017 Taipei	200 m freestyle
Summer Youth Olympics
Silver medal – second place	2014 Nanjing	100 m freestyle
Silver medal – second place	2014 Nanjing	200 m medley
World Junior Championships
Gold medal – first place	2013 Dubai	100 m freestyle
Bronze medal – third place	2013 Dubai	50 m freestyle

Chinese name
- Traditional Chinese: 何詩蓓
- Simplified Chinese: 何诗蓓
- Cantonese Yale: Hòh Sīpùih
Transcriptions
Standard Mandarin
- Hanyu Pinyin: Hé Shībèi
- IPA: [xɤ̌ ʂɻ̩́ pêɪ]
Yue: Cantonese
- Yale Romanization: Hòh Sīpùih
- Jyutping: ho4 si1 pui4
- IPA: [hɔ˩ si˥ pʰuj˩]

Siobhán Bernadette Haughey SBS (/ʃəˈvɔːn ˈhɔːhi/ shə-VAWN HAW-hee; Chinese: 何詩蓓; Cantonese pronunciation: [hɔ˩ si˥ pʰuj˩]; born 31 October 1997) is a Hong Kong professional competitive swimmer. She became the first Hong Kong swimmer to win an Olympic medal and the first Hong Kong athlete to win two Olympic medals in any sport, after winning silver in the women's 200-metre freestyle and women's 100-metre freestyle during the Tokyo 2020 Summer Olympics. She later became the only Hong Kong athlete to win four Olympic medals after winning bronze in the women's 200-metre freestyle and the women's 100-metre freestyle at the Paris 2024 Summer Olympics. She also won the first swimming gold for Hong Kong in 2022 Asian Games, and became the most decorated Hong Kong athlete of all time in one single edition of Asian Games with two golds, one silver, and three bronzes.

Haughey is Hong Kong's first World Record holding swimmer after breaking the 200-metre freestyle record at the 2021 World Short Course Championships, as well as the first ever Short Course World and Junior World champion. She has registered 24 Hong Kong records and 6 Asian records in her career, and in total she has broken Hong Kong and Asian records for 99 times and 23 times respectively. She represented Energy Standard in the International Swimming League.

== Personal life ==
Haughey was born in Hong Kong on 31 October 1997, shortly after the territory's handover, to an Irish father, Darach, and a Chinese (Hong Kong) mother, Canjo. She was baptised a Catholic at St. Margaret's Church, Hong Kong. Her elder sister, Aisling, is also a swimmer and represented Hong Kong in amateur events. Her paternal granduncle was former Irish Taoiseach Charles Haughey. Siobhán attended St. Paul's Primary Catholic School and St. Paul's Secondary School. She graduated from the University of Michigan in 2019, majoring in psychology.

== Swimming career ==
Haughey won gold and broke the meet record in the 100-metre freestyle at the World Junior Championships in 2013; she was the first Hong Kong swimmer to medal at the event. She won two silver and five bronze medals in 2013 East Asian Games, making her the most decorated Hong Kong athlete all time in a single East Asian Games.

In 2014, she gained another two silver medals in the women's 100-metre freestyle and 200m individual medley at the Youth Olympics, again setting a high place for the Hong Kong swimming team. In 2016, she was named Swimmer of the Championships at the Big Ten Conference championships and helped lead the Michigan Wolverines swimming and diving team to the women's team title for the first time since 2004.

In 2015, Haughey qualified for the Summer Olympics in Rio de Janeiro as the first Hong Kong swimmer to make the Olympic Qualifying Time (OQT), and was selected to represent Hong Kong in the women's 200-metre freestyle and 200-metre individual medley. At the 2016 Rio Olympics, Haughey won her heat in the 200-metre freestyle, but finished sixth in the semi-finals and thirteenth overall. Despite failing to advance to the finals, she still made history as the first Hong Kong swimmer to advance beyond the heats in the modern Olympics era.

In 2017, Haughey participated in the World Aquatics Championships and finished 5th in women's 200-metre freestyle. This marked the first time Hong Kong had a swimmer in a final at the long course World Championships meet. A few weeks later in the Taipei Universiade, she won gold in both the women's 100-metre freestyle and 200-metre freestyle.

In 2019, Haughey stepped up again in the World Aquatics Championships and raced her fastest time ever in the 200-metre freestyle event, finishing with a time of 1:54.98 to fall just 2 shy of the podium and finishing fourth. As such, Haughey became the first woman ever from Hong Kong to hit a sub-1:55 200m freestyle time. Later at the inaugural International Swimming League season, she continued her onslaught of the Hong Kong National Records in swimming, setting new Asian records in both the 200-metre freestyle and 50-metre breaststroke.

Haughey represented Hong Kong again at the Tokyo 2020 Summer Olympics, where she won silver in the 200-metre freestyle and 100-metre freestyle. She became the first Hong Kong swimmer to win an Olympic medal and the first Hong Kong athlete to win two Olympic medals in any sport. In the 2021 International Swimming League season, she went undefeated in the 200-metre freestyle event throughout the season and set a new Asian record in the 100-metre freestyle. Additionally, she finished second in the ISL season MVP standings, 43.5 points behind Energy Standard teammate Sarah Sjöström and 64.5 points ahead of third place.

Later in the year, she followed up her performance at the Tokyo Olympics and the ISL with a historic gold medal in the 200-metre freestyle at the 2021 Short Course World Championships. In the process, she broke Sarah Sjöström's 2017 world record by 0.12 seconds and became the first Hong Kong swimmer to win a medal at the Short Course Worlds, plus the first world record holder representing Hong Kong. She won her second gold medal two days later in the 100-metre freestyle event, plus a bronze medal in the 400-metre freestyle.

At the 2022 Short Course World Championships, Haughey successfully defended her title in the 200-metre freestyle. She added a silver medal to her tally with a runner-up finish in the 100-metre freestyle, trailing behind Emma McKeon.

At the 2023 World Aquatics Championships, Haughey captured a silver medal in the 100-metre freestyle – the first Hong Kong swimmer to finish on the podium at the World Aquatics Championships.

At the 2022 Asian Games, Haughey won a pair of gold medals in the 100-metre and 200-metre freestyle, together with a silver medal in the 50-metre freestyle and bronze in the 50-metre breaststroke, 4x100 metre medley relay and 4x100 metre freestyle relay. During the process she broke the Asian record for the 100-metre freestyle in 52.17, and broke 7 Hong Kong records in total, including all 3 relay events.

At the 2024 World Aquatics Championships, Haughey captured a bronze medal in the 100-metre breaststroke, behind China's Tang Qianting and Dutch swimmer Tes Schouten. On 14 February 2024, She captured her first world long-course gold medal in the 200-metre freestyle, becoming the first Hong Kong swimmer to finish first at the World Aquatics Championships. Haughey claimed another silver medal in 100-metre freestyle two days later.

At the 2024 Paris Olympics, Haughey won two bronze medals in the women's 200m freestyle and the women's 100m freestyle. This makes her the only Hong Kong athlete to have won four Olympic medals. She finished with a time of 1:54.55 in the 200m freestyle, and 52.33 in the 100m freestyle. During the opening ceremony, Haughey and Cheung Ka-long were the flag bearers for the Hong Kong Olympic team.

== Honours ==
- Hong Kong Sports Stars Awards

- Four-time winner of the Best Hong Kong Sports Stars Award (2021, 2022, 2023, 2025)
- Seven-time winner of the Hong Kong Sports Stars Award (2017, 2019, 2021, 2022, 2023, 2024, 2025)
- Two-time winner of the Hong Kong Junior Sports Stars Awards (2013, 2014)

- Three-time SwimSwam Asian Female Swimmer of the Year (2019, 2020, 2021)
- Two-time overall winner of the Mare Nostrum Swim Tour (2023, 2024)
- HKSAR Silver Bauhinia Star (2021)
- HKSAR Chief Executive's Commendation for Community Service (2017)
- Big Ten Medal of Honor (2019)
- 14-time CSCAA All-American (2016–2019: 200-yard Freestyle; 2017–2019: 800-yard freestyle relay; 2018–2019: 100-yard freestyle, 200-yard freestyle relay, 400-yard freestyle relay; 2019: 400-yard medley relay)
- 11-time CSCAA All-America Honorable Mention (2016–2018: 200-yard IM; 2017–2018: 400-yard medley relay; 2016–2017: 100-yard freestyle, 400-yard freestyle relay; 2016: 200-yard freestyle relay, 800-yard freestyle relay)
- 15-time Big Ten champion (2016–2019: 200-yard freestyle; 2016, 2018–2019: 400-yard freestyle relay; 2016–2017, 2019: 800-yard freestyle relay; 2016, 2019: 100-yard freestyle; 2016, 2018: 200-yard IM; 2019: 200-yard freestyle relay)
- 2016 Big Ten Swimmer of the Championships
- Four-time All-Big Ten (2016–2019: First Team)
- Two-time CSCAA Scholar All-American (2017–2018)
- Three-time Academic All-Big Ten (2017–2019)
- Big Ten Distinguished Scholar (2018)
- Four-time U-M Athletic Academic Achievement (2016–2019)
- Two-term World Aquatics Athletes Committee member (2022–2025, 2025-2029)

== World records ==
=== Short course (25m) ===
No.	Event	Time23	Meet	Location	Date	Status	Ref
1	200 m freestyle	1:50.31	2021 World Championships (25 m)	Abu Dhabi, United Arab Emirates	16 December 2021	Former	

Records
Preceded by (Sweden) Sarah Sjöström	Women's 200-metre freestyle world record holder (short course); 12 December 2021–present	Incumbent
