= Rebecca Smith (swimmer) =

Canadian swimmer (born 2000)

Personal information
- Born: 14 March 2000 (age 26) Red Deer, Alberta, Canada
- Height: 180 cm (5 ft 11 in)
- Weight: 59 kg (130 lb)

Sport
- Sport: Swimming
- Strokes: Freestyle
- Club: 2020 Toronto Titans; 2019 Energy Standard
Medal record
Women's swimming
Representing Canada
Event	1st	2nd	3rd
Olympic Games	0	1	0
World Championships (LC)	0	1	7
World Championships (SC)	3	3	3
Commonwealth Games	0	2	2
Total	3	7	12
Olympic Games
Silver medal – second place	2020 Tokyo	4×100 m freestyle
World Championships (LC)
Silver medal – second place	2022 Budapest	4×100 m freestyle
Bronze medal – third place	2017 Budapest	4×100 m mixed medley
Bronze medal – third place	2019 Gwangju	4×100 m freestyle
Bronze medal – third place	2019 Gwangju	4×200 m freestyle
Bronze medal – third place	2019 Gwangju	4×100 m medley
Bronze medal – third place	2022 Budapest	4×200 m freestyle
Bronze medal – third place	2024 Doha	4×100 m freestyle
Bronze medal – third place	2024 Doha	4×100 m medley
World Championships (SC)
Gold medal – first place	2021 Abu Dhabi	4×100 m freestyle
Gold medal – first place	2021 Abu Dhabi	4×200 m freestyle
Gold medal – first place	2021 Abu Dhabi	4×50 m mixed freestyle
Silver medal – second place	2021 Abu Dhabi	200 m freestyle
Silver medal – second place	2022 Melbourne	200 m freestyle
Silver medal – second place	2022 Melbourne	4×200 m freestyle
Bronze medal – third place	2022 Melbourne	4×100 m freestyle
Bronze medal – third place	2022 Melbourne	4×100 m medley
Bronze medal – third place	2022 Melbourne	4×50 m mixed medley
Pan Pacific Championships
Bronze medal – third place	2018 Tokyo	4×100 m freestyle
Bronze medal – third place	2018 Tokyo	4×200 m freestyle
Commonwealth Games
Silver medal – second place	2018 Gold Coast	4×200 m freestyle
Silver medal – second place	2022 Birmingham	4×100 m mixed medley
Bronze medal – third place	2022 Birmingham	4×100 m mixed freestyle
Bronze medal – third place	2022 Birmingham	4×100 m freestyle
World Junior Championships
Gold medal – first place	2017 Indianapolis	4×200 m freestyle
Silver medal – second place	2015 Singapore	4×200 m freestyle
Bronze medal – third place	2015 Singapore	4×100 m freestyle
Junior Pan Pacific Championships
Silver medal – second place	2016 Maui	50 m freestyle
Silver medal – second place	2016 Maui	100 m freestyle
Silver medal – second place	2016 Maui	100 m butterfly
Silver medal – second place	2016 Maui	4×100 m freestyle
Silver medal – second place	2016 Maui	4×100 m medley

Rebecca Smith (born 14 March 2000) is a Canadian former competitive swimmer. She represented Canada at the 2020 Summer Olympics, winning a silver medal in the 4×100 metre freestyle relay, and is a multi-medallist at the World Aquatics Championships, World Swimming Championships, Commonwealth Games, and Pan Pacific Swimming Championships.

== Career ==
At the 2017 World Championships in Budapest Smith was part of the bronze medal-winning team in the 4 × 100 m mixed medley. Later in 2017 Smith was also part of the gold medal 4 × 200 m freestyle 2017 World Junior Swimming Championships team in Indianapolis. In the process the team broke the junior world record and championship record.

In September 2017, Smith was named to Canada's 2018 Commonwealth Games team.

In the Autumn of 2019 she was member of the inaugural International Swimming League (ISL) swimming for the Energy Standard International Swim Club, who won the team title in Las Vegas, Nevada, in December. In spring 2020, Smith signed for the newly formed Toronto Titans, the first and only Canadian team in the ISL.

In June 2021, she qualified to represent Canada at the 2020 Summer Olympics. Smith won a silver medal as part of the Canadian team in the 4 × 100 m freestyle relay, alongside Kayla Sanchez, Maggie Mac Neil and Penny Oleksiak.

At the 2022 World Aquatics Championships, Smith swam in the heats of the 4 × 100 m freestyle relay. She was replaced by Mac Neil in the event final, but shared in the team's first-ever silver medal win at the World Championships in a relay. She also competed in the heats of the 4 × 200 m freestyle relay for the Canadian team, helping to the event final, where she was replaced by Taylor Ruck. She shared in the team's bronze medal win. Later in the summer, named to Canada's team for the 2022 Commonwealth Games, Smith won a bronze medal in the mixed 4 × 100 m freestyle relay. On the second day of competition, she finished eighth in the 100 m butterfly and won a bronze medal in the 4 × 100 m freestyle relay. Teammates Maggie Mac Neil and Katerine Savard did the same double. Smith said she was "a little disappointed with my swims tonight." Smith swam the freestyle anchor leg in the heats of the 4 × 100 m mixed medley, but was replaced by Ruslan Gaziev in the final. She received a silver medal after the team finished second there.

Smith continued competing domestically during 2023, but did not appear in international competition while focusing on completing her nursing degree at the University of Calgary. While many of Canada's top swimmers opted to skip the 2024 World Aquatics Championships in Doha, Smith was named to the team. She said she viewed Doha has "a really great stepping stone leading into Olympic trials in May. I'm just excited to get in there and race and see where I'm at." On the first day of swimming finals, Smith participated in the 4 × 100 m freestyle relay, where Canada won a bronze medal. With Maggie Mac Neil absent, she then swam the butterfly leg for Canada in the 4 × 100 m medley relay, winning another bronze medal.

Smith announced her retirement from competitive swimming in February 2025.
