= Elisa Mele =

Italian footballer (born 1996)

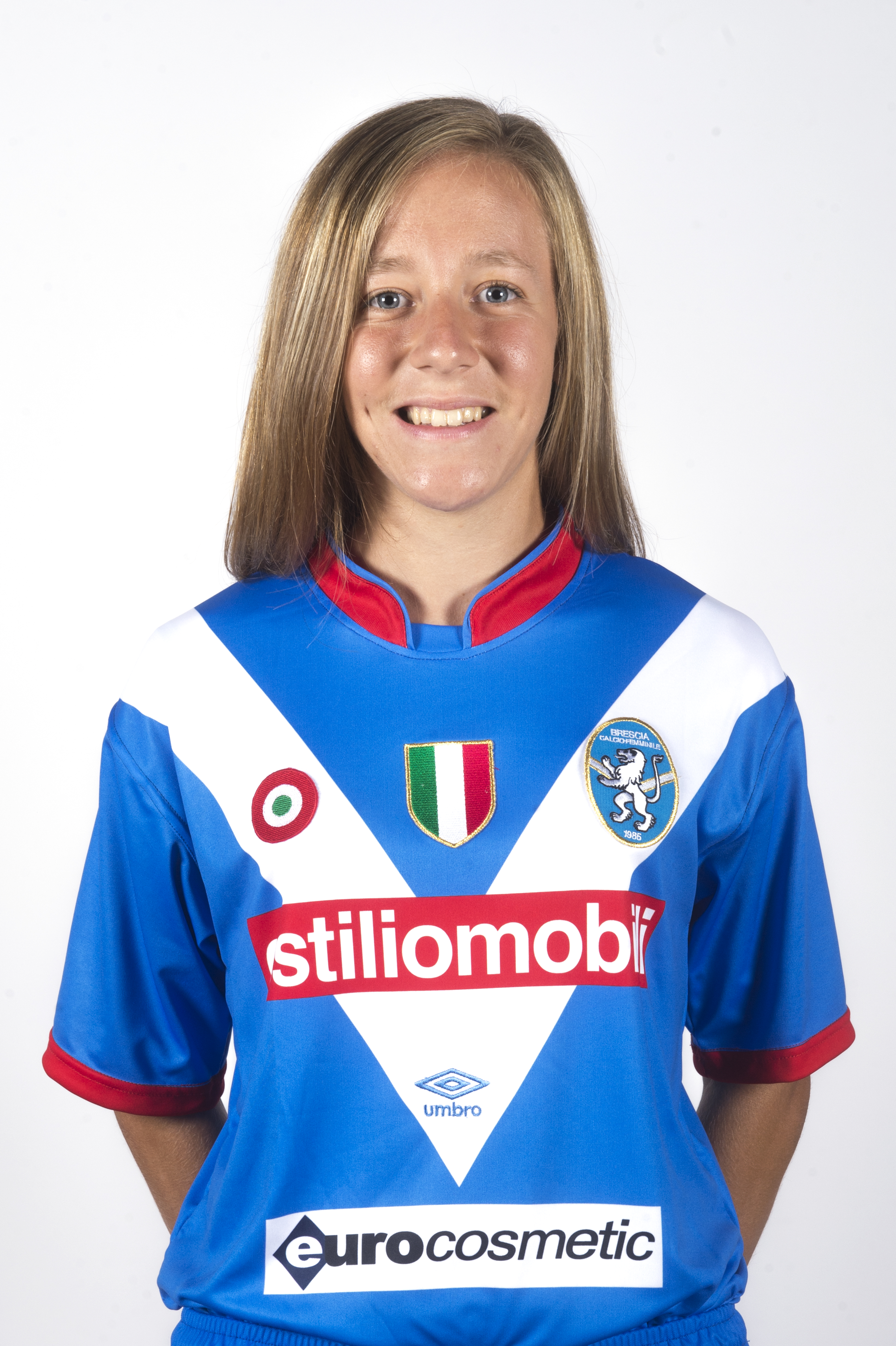

Personal information
- Date of birth: 24 August 1996 (age 30)
- Place of birth: Brescia, Italy
- Height: 1.65 m (5 ft 5 in)
- Position: Midfielder

Senior career*
Years	Team	Apps	(Gls)
2012–2017	Brescia	31	(4)
- * Club domestic league appearances and goals

Elisa Mele is Italian professional footballer who played as a midfielder for Brescia. She retired from professional football to become a missionary in Africa.
