= List of Mongolian records in swimming =

The Mongolian records in swimming are the fastest ever performances of swimmers from Mongolia, which are recognised and ratified by the Mongolian Amateur Swimming Federation (Mongolia Aquatics).

All records were set in finals unless noted otherwise.

== Long Course (50 m) ==
=== Men ===
Event	Time		Name	Club	Date	Meet	Location	Ref
50 m freestyle	23.44	r	Erkhes Enkhtur	Spire	26 March 2026	Central Zone East Spring Speedo Sectionals	Indianapolis, United States	
100 m freestyle	50.49		Enkhatmir Batbayar	Mongolia	24 April 2025	Australian Championships	Brisbane, Australia	
200 m freestyle	1:50.26	h	Enkhatmir Batbayar	Mongolia	18 July 2025	World University Games	Berlin, Germany	
400 m freestyle	4:10.97		Enkhatmir Batbayar	Mongolia	7 April 2024	Thailand Age Group Championships	Samut Prakan, Thailand	
800 m freestyle	8:54.59		Enkhatmir Batbayar	Mongolia	9 April 2024	Thailand Age Group Championships	Samut Prakan, Thailand	
1500 m freestyle	17:32.24		Nasan Tsengeg	Aggie	5 July 2013	Aggieland July Invitational	College Station, United States	
50 m backstroke	25.62		Erkhes Enkhtur	Spire	27 March 2026	Central Zone East Spring Speedo Sectionals	Indianapolis, United States	
100 m backstroke	56.93		Erkhes Enkhtur	Spire	28 March 2026	Central Zone East Spring Speedo Sectionals	Indianapolis, United States	
200 m backstroke	2:06.99	b	Erkhes Enkhtur	Lake Erie Silver Dolphins	27 March 2025	Spring Speedo Sectionals	Indianapolis, United States	
50 m breaststroke	29.08		Erkhes Enkhtur	Mongolia	22 February 2025	Malaysia Invitational Age Group Championships	Kuala Lumpur, Malaysia	
100 m breaststroke	1:03.23		Enkhmend Enkhmend	BISP Sea Eagles	4 April 2026	Thailand Age Group Championships	Samutprakan, Thailand	
200 m breaststroke	2:19.67	h	Enkhmend Enkhmend	Mongolia	18 July 2026	Asian Age Group Championships	Samutprakan, Thailand	
50 m butterfly	25.53	b	Erkhes Enkhtur	Spire	26 March 2026	Central Zone East Spring Speedo Sectionals	Indianapolis, United States	
100 m butterfly	56.90	h	Ninjin Enkhbaatar	Mongolia	23 September 2026	Asian Games	Tokyo, Japan	
200 m butterfly	2:14.73	h	Belgudei Uyanga	Mongolia	19 July 2025	World University Games	Berlin, Germany	
200 m individual medley	2:05.75		Enkhatmir Batbayar	Mongolia	23 April 2025	Australian Championships	Brisbane, Australia	
400 m individual medley	4:46.31		Enkhmend Enkhmend	BISP Sea Eagles	5 April 2026	Thailand Age Group Championships	Samutprakan, Thailand	
4×100 m freestyle relay	3:33.25	h	Enkhtamir Batbayar (50.58); Badmaarag Gantugs (54.30); Maidar Gongor (54.77); Ninjin Enkhbaatar (53.60)	Mongolia	24 September 2026	Asian Games	Tokyo, Japan	
4×200 m freestyle relay	8:10.37	h	Enkhatmir Batbayar (1:52.54); Maidar Gongor (2:04.90); Sugar Ganzorigt (2:06.71); Ninjin Enkhbaatar (2:06.22)	Mongolia	21 September 2026	Asian Games	Tokyo, Japan	
4×100 m medley relay	3:59.25	h	Erkhes Enkhtur (57.92); Enkhmend Enkhmend (1:06.40); Ninjin Enkhbaatar (59.51); Bilguun Nyamsuren (55.42)	Mongolia	24 August 2025	World Junior Championships	Otopeni, Romania	

Legend: # – Record awaiting ratification by Mongolian Amateur Swimming Federation; WR – World record; AS – Asian record; e – equalled existing record;
Records not set in finals: h – heat; sf – semifinal; r – relay 1st leg; rh – relay heat 1st leg; b – B final; † – en route to final mark; so – swim-off; tt – time trial

=== Women ===
Event	Time		Name	Club	Date	Meet	Location	Ref
50 m freestyle	26.78	h	Enuhkhuslen Batbayar	Mongolia	11 April 2024	Thailand Age Group Championships	Samut Prakan, Thailand	
100 m freestyle	56.55	rh	Enuhkhuslen Batbayar	Mongolia	24 September 2023	Asian Games	Hangzhou, China	
200 m freestyle	1:59.94	h	Enuhkhuslen Batbayar	Mongolia	28 July 2024	Olympic Games	Paris, France	
400 m freestyle	4:13.77		Enuhkhuslen Batbayar	Mongolia	8 April 2024	Thailand Age Group Championships	Samut Prakan, Thailand	
800 m freestyle	8:57.64		Enuhkhuslen Batbayar	Mongolia	23 May 2024	Malaysia Open Championships	Kuala Lumpur, Malaysia	
1500 m freestyle	17:25.10		Enuhkhuslen Batbayar	Mongolia	26 May 2024	Malaysia Open Championships	Kuala Lumpur, Malaysia	
50 m backstroke	29.94		Ariuntamir Enkh-Amgalan	Stipendium Hungaricum	13 December 2025	BVSC Cup	Budapest, Hungary	
100 m backstroke	1:04.91	h	Ariuntamir Enkh-Amgalan	Stipendium Hungaricum	16 April 2026	Hungarian Championships	Sopron, Hungary	
200 m backstroke	2:20.58	h	Ariuntamir Enkh-Amgalan	Mongolia	22 September 2026	Asian Games	Tokyo, Japan	
50 m breaststroke	33.96	h	Enuhkhuslen Batbayar	Mongolia	25 May 2024	Malaysia Open Championships	Kuala Lumpur, Malaysia	
100 m breaststroke	1:15.03	b	Maral Batsanal	Spire	28 March 2026	Central Zone East Spring Speedo Sectionals	Indianapolis, United States	
200 m breaststroke	2:45.12	h	Maral Batsanal	Spire	26 March 2026	Central Zone East Spring Speedo Sectionals	Indianapolis, United States	
50 m butterfly	28.51		Enuhkhuslen Batbayar	Mongolia	23 May 2024	Malaysia Open Championships	Kuala Lumpur, Malaysia	
100 m butterfly	1:03.16		Enuhkhuslen Batbayar	Mongolia	25 May 2024	Malaysia Open Championships	Kuala Lumpur, Malaysia	
200 m butterfly	2:40.32	h	Anungoo Temuujin	Mongolia	24 September 2023	Asian Games	Hangzhou, China	
200 m individual medley	2:17.76		Enuhkhuslen Batbayar	Mongolia	11 April 2024	Thailand Age Group Championships	Samut Prakan, Thailand	
400 m individual medley	5:05.10	h	Enuhkhuslen Batbayar	Mongolia	24 May 2024	Malaysia Open Championships	Kuala Lumpur, Malaysia	
4×100 m freestyle relay	4:05.81	h	Enuhkhuslen Batbayar (57.92); Enerelen Gurdavaa (1:02.43); Orgilmaa Badrakh (1:03.14); Maral Batsanal (1:02.32)	Mongolia	20 September 2026	Asian Games	Tokyo, Japan	
4×200 m freestyle relay	9:08.78	h	Enuhkhuslen Batbayar (2:06.27); Khandarmaa Batsukh (2:21.31); Altannar Amgalan (2:22.13); Orgilmaa Badrakh (2:19.07)	Mongolia	24 September 2026	Asian Games	Tokyo, Japan	
4×100 m medley relay	4:47.34	h	Ujin Orkhon (1:13.87); Enkhriimaa Tsog-Ochir (1:18.44); Nomuunaa Ganbaatar (1:09.79); Indra Odsuren (1:05.24)	Mongolia	9 September 2023	World Junior Championships	Netanya, Israel	

Legend: # – Record awaiting ratification by Mongolian Amateur Swimming Federation; WR – World record; AS – Asian record; e – equalled existing record;
Records not set in finals: h – heat; sf – semifinal; r – relay 1st leg; rh – relay heat 1st leg; b – B final; † – en route to final mark; so – swim-off; tt – time trial

=== Mixed relay ===
Event	Time		Name	Club	Date	Meet	Location	Ref
4×100 m freestyle relay	3:50.99	h	Delgerkhuu Myagmar (53.68); Zandanbal Gunsennorov (55.10); Enkhzul Khuyagbaatar (1:03.61); Enkhkhuslen Batbayar (58.60)	Mongolia	27 July 2019	World Championships	Gwangju, South Korea	
4×100 m medley relay	4:05.09	h	Ariuntamir Enkh-Amgalan (1:04.72); Erkhes Enkhtur (1:05.48); Enkhtamir Batbayar (58.42); Enkhkhuslen Batbayar (56.47)	Mongolia	14 February 2024	World Championships	Doha, Qatar	

Legend: # – Record awaiting ratification by Mongolian Amateur Swimming Federation; WR – World record; AS – Asian record; e – equalled existing record;
Records not set in finals: h – heat; so – swim-off

== Short Course (25 m) ==
=== Men ===
Event	Time		Name	Club	Date	Meet	Location	Ref
50 m freestyle	22.77		Enkhtamir Batbayar	We Aquatics	1 November 2024	President's Cup	Ulaanbaatar, Mongolia	
100 m freestyle	49.15	h	Enkhtamir Batbayar	Mongolia	25 October 2024	World Cup	Incheon, South Korea	
200 m freestyle	1:48.26	h	Enkhtamir Batbayar	Mongolia	26 October 2024	World Cup	Incheon, South Korea	
400 m freestyle	4:00.30		Enkhtamir Batbayar	We Aquatics	8 November 2025	President's Cup	Ulaanbaatar, Mongolia	
800 m freestyle	8:47.00		Enkhtamir Batbayar	We Aquatics	9 January 2026	Mongolian Championships	Ulaanbaatar, Mongolia	
1500 m freestyle	17:00.64		Jurmed Batmunkh	-	24 October 2020	Mongolian Age Group Championships	Mongolia	
50 m backstroke	25.70		Erkhes Enkhtur	Selem Zagas	1 June 2024	Cup of clubs (Selem Zagas)	Ulaanbaatar, Mongolia	
100 m backstroke	56.26		Erkhes Enkhtur	Selem Zagas	31 May 2024	Cup of clubs (Selem Zagas)	Ulaanbaatar, Mongolia	
200 m backstroke	2:09.53		Khanbilig Munkh-Orgil	We Aquatics	9 January 2026	Mongolian Championships	Ulaanbaatar, Mongolia	
50 m breaststroke	28.25		Enkhmend Enkhmend	BISP Sea Eagles	14 August 2026	Thailand Age Group Championships	Bangkok, Thailand	
100 m breaststroke	1:00.24		Enkhmend Enkhmend	BISP Sea Eagles	13 August 2026	Thailand Age Group Championships	Bangkok, Thailand	
200 m breaststroke	2:16.83		Enkhtamir Batbayar	We Aquatics	8 January 2026	Mongolian Championships	Ulaanbaatar, Mongolia	
50 m butterfly	24.88		Enkhatmir Batbayar	We Aquatics Club	2 November 2024	President's Cup	Ulaanbaatar, Mongolia	
100 m butterfly	55.11		Enkhatmir Batbayar	We Aquatics Club	1 November 2024	President's Cup	Ulaanbaatar, Mongolia	
200 m butterfly	2:05.75		Enkhtamir Batbayar	We Aquatics	6 November 2025	President's Cup	Ulaanbaatar, Mongolia	
100 m individual medley	55.42		Enkhatmir Batbayar	We Aquatics Club	2 November 2024	President's Cup	Ulaanbaatar, Mongolia	
200 m individual medley	2:01.35		Enkhtamir Batbayar	We Aquatics Club	1 November 2024	President's Cup	Ulaanbaatar, Mongolia	
400 m individual medley	4:33.28		Enkhtamir Batbayar	We Aquatics	9 November 2025	President's Cup	Ulaanbaatar, Mongolia	
4×50 m freestyle relay	1:35.73		Bilegt Amarsanaa (24.91); Mijiddorj Byambajav (24.70); Belgudei Uyanga (23.61); Enkhatmir Batbayar (22.51)	We Aquatics	9 January 2026	Mongolian Championships	Ulaanbaatar, Mongolia	
4×100 m freestyle relay	3:29.51		Belgudei Uyanga (53.71); Badmaarag Gantugs (53.69); Maidar Gongor (53.05); Enkhatmir Batbayar (49.06)	We Aquatics	8 January 2026	Mongolian Championships	Ulaanbaatar, Mongolia	
4×200 m freestyle relay								
4×50 m medley relay	1:45.72		Khanbilig Munkh-Orgil (26.81); Enkhatmir Batbayar (28.23); Belgudei Uyanga (25.81); Tselmeg Khash-Erdene (24.87)	We Aquatics	8 January 2026	Mongolian Championships	Ulaanbaatar, Mongolia	
4×100 m medley relay	3:54.61		Khanbilig Munkh-Orgil (57.89); Enkhatmir Batbayar (1:03.28); Belgudei Uyanga (1:00.13); Maidar Gongor (53.31)	We Aquatics	9 January 2026	Mongolian Championships	Ulaanbaatar, Mongolia	

Legend: # – Record awaiting ratification by Mongolian Amateur Swimming Federation; WR – World record; AS – Asian record; e – equalled existing record;
Records not set in finals: h – heat; sf – semifinal; r – relay 1st leg; rh – relay heat 1st leg; b – B final; † – en route to final mark; so – swim-off; tt – time trial

=== Women ===
Event	Time		Name	Club	Date	Meet	Location	Ref
50 m freestyle	26.06		Enkhkhuslen Batbayar	We Aquatics	10 January 2026	Mongolian Championships	Ulaanbaatar, Mongolia	
100 m freestyle	55.59		Enkhkhuslen Batbayar	Mongolia	22 December 2023	Thailand Age Group Championships	Samutprakan, Thailand	
200 m freestyle	1:56.46	h	Enkhkhuslen Batbayar	Mongolia	18 December 2022	World Championships	Melbourne, Australia	
400 m freestyle	4:23.80	†	Enkhkhuslen Batbayar	Mongolia	21 October 2022	Thailand Championships	Samut Prakan, Thailand	
800 m freestyle	8:47.20		Enkhkhuslen Batbayar	Mongolia	21 October 2022	Thailand Championships	Samut Prakan, Thailand	
1500 m freestyle	17:18.24		Enkhkhuslen Batbayar	We Aquatics	8 January 2026	Mongolian Championships	Ulaanbaatar, Mongolia	
50 m backstroke	28.77	b	Ariuntamir Enh-amgalan	Stipendium Hungaricum	4 November 2026	Hungarian Championships	Kaposvár, Hungary	
100 m backstroke	1:01.77		Ariuntamir Enh-amgalan	Stipendium Hungaricum	5 November 2026	Hungarian Championships	Kaposvár, Hungary	
200 m backstroke	2:15.28		Ariuntamir Enh-amgalan	Stipendium Hungaricum	7 November 2026	Hungarian Championships	Kaposvár, Hungary	
50 m breaststroke	32.65		Enkhkhuslen Batbayar	We Aquatics	9 January 2026	Mongolian Championships	Ulaanbaatar, Mongolia	
100 m breaststroke	1:12.50		Enkhkhuslen Batbayar	Mongolia	23 October 2022	Thailand Championships	Samut Prakan, Thailand	
200 m breaststroke	2:35.60	h	Enkhkhuslen Batbayar	We Aquatics	8 January 2026	Mongolian Championships	Ulaanbaatar, Mongolia	
50 m butterfly	28.30		Enkhkhuslen Batbayar	We Aquatics	11 January 2026	Mongolian Championships	Ulaanbaatar, Mongolia	
100 m butterfly	1:02.86		Enkhkhuslen Batbayar	We Aquatics	11 January 2026	Mongolian Championships	Ulaanbaatar, Mongolia	
200 m butterfly	2:23.74		Enkhkhuslen Batbayar	We Aquatics	10 January 2026	Mongolian Championships	Ulaanbaatar, Mongolia	
100m individual medley	1:03.50		Enkhkhuslen Batbayar	We Aquatics	8 January 2026	Mongolian Championships	Ulaanbaatar, Mongolia	
200m individual medley	2:15.62		Enkhkhuslen Batbayar	Mongolia	21 December 2023	Thailand Age Group Championships	Samutprakan, Thailand	
400m individual medley	5:00.11		Enkhkhuslen Batbayar	We Aquatics	11 January 2026	Mongolian Championships	Ulaanbaatar, Mongolia	
4×50m freestyle relay	1:52.39		[[]] (30.16); [[]] (29.00); [[]] (27.79); Enkhkhuslen Batbayar (25.44)	We Aquatics	9 January 2026	Mongolian Championships	Ulaanbaatar, Mongolia	
4×100m freestyle relay	4:01.06		[[]] (1:02.90); [[]] (1:00.67); [[]] (1:02.37); Enkhkhuslen Batbayar (55.12)	We Aquatics	8 January 2026	Mongolian Championships	Ulaanbaatar, Mongolia	
4×200m freestyle relay								
4×50m medley relay	2:00.86		[[]] (32.81); [[]] (31.99); [[]] (28.62); [[]] (27.44)	We Aquatics	8 January 2026	Mongolian Championships	Ulaanbaatar, Mongolia	
4×100m medley relay	4:44.68		[[]] (1:11.04); [[]] (1:25.29); [[]] (1:07.29); [[]] (1:01.06)	Selem zagas	23 January 2025	Mongolian Championships	Baruun-Urt, Mongolia	

Legend: # – Record awaiting ratification by Mongolian Amateur Swimming Federation; WR – World record; AS – Asian record; e – equalled existing record;
Records not set in finals: h – heat; sf – semifinal; r – relay 1st leg; rh – relay heat 1st leg; b – B final; † – en route to final mark; so – swim-off; tt – time trial

=== Mixed relay ===
Event	Time		Name	Club	Date	Meet	Location	Ref
4×50 m freestyle relay	1:42.90	h	Myagmaryn Delgerkhüü (24.34); Batbayaryn Enkhkhüslen (26.69); Enkhzul Khuyagbaatar (27.81); Zandanbal Gunsennorov (24.06)	Mongolia	12 December 2018	World Championships	Hangzhou, China	
4×100 m freestyle relay	3:43.92			-	10 January 2026	Mongolian Championships		
4×50 m medley relay	1:50.37		Khanbilig Munkh-Orgil (26.58); Enkhtamir Batbayar (28.51); Gurdavaa Enerelen; Enkhkhuslen Batbayar	We Aquatics	10 January 2026	Mongolian Championships	Ulaanbaatar, Mongolia	

Legend: # – Record awaiting ratification by Mongolian Amateur Swimming Federation; e – equalled existing record;
Records not set in finals: h – heat; so – swim-off
