= Ekaterina Nikonova =

Russian swimmer

Personal information
- Nationality: Russian
- Born: 25 April 2003 (age 23)

Sport
- Sport: Swimming
- Strokes: Freestyle
Medal record
Women's swimming
Representing Russia
World Junior Championships
Silver medal – second place	2019 Budapest	4×100 m medley
Silver medal – second place	2019 Budapest	4×100 m mixed freestyle
Silver medal – second place	2019 Budapest	4×100 m mixed medley
European Junior Championships
Gold medal – first place	2018 Helsinki	4×100 m freestyle
Gold medal – first place	2018 Helsinki	4×100 m mixed freestyle
Gold medal – first place	2019 Kazan	4×200 m freestyle
Gold medal – first place	2019 Kazan	4×100 m medley
Silver medal – second place	2019 Kazan	4×100 m freestyle
Silver medal – second place	2019 Kazan	4×100 m mixed freestyle
Bronze medal – third place	2019 Kazan	50 m freestyle

Ekaterina Nikonova (born 25 April 2003) is a Russian swimmer. She competed in the women's 100 metre freestyle event at the 2021 FINA World Swimming Championships (25 m) in Abu Dhabi.
