= Cheng Yujie =

Chinese swimmer (born 2005)

Personal information
- Native name: 程玉洁
- Nationality: Chinese
- Born: 22 September 2005 (age 21) Jingdezhen, Jiangxi, China
- Height: 180 cm (5 ft 11 in)

Sport
- Sport: Swimming
- Strokes: Freestyle
Medal record
Women's swimming
Representing China
Olympic Games
Bronze medal – third place	2024 Paris	4×100 m freestyle
World Championships (LC)
Gold medal – first place	2023 Fukuoka	4×100 m mixed medley
Silver medal – second place	2025 Singapore	4×100 m mixed medley
Bronze medal – third place	2023 Fukuoka	4×100 m freestyle
Bronze medal – third place	2025 Singapore	50 m freestyle
Bronze medal – third place	2025 Singapore	4×100 m medley
World Championships (SC)
Bronze medal – third place	2021 Abu Dhabi	4×200 m freestyle
Bronze medal – third place	2021 Abu Dhabi	4×100 m medley
Pan Pacific Championships
Bronze medal – third place	2026 Irvine	4×100 m medley
Asian Games
Gold medal – first place	2022 Hangzhou	4×100 m freestyle
Gold medal – first place	2022 Hangzhou	4×200 m freestyle
Gold medal – first place	2022 Hangzhou	4×100 m mixed medley
Gold medal – first place	2026 Aichi–Nagoya	4×100 m freestyle
Gold medal – first place	2026 Aichi–Nagoya	4×100 m medley
Gold medal – first place	2026 Aichi-Nagoya	4×100 m mixed medley
Gold medal – first place	2026 Aichi–Nagoya	4×200 m freestyle
Bronze medal – third place	2022 Hangzhou	50 m freestyle
Bronze medal – third place	2022 Hangzhou	100 m freestyle
Bronze medal – third place	2026 Aichi–Nagoya	50 m freestyle
Bronze medal – third place	2026 Aichi–Nagoya	100 m freestyle

Cheng Yujie (simplified Chinese: 程玉洁; traditional Chinese: 程玉潔; pinyin: Chéng Yùjié; born 22 September 2005) is a Chinese freestyle swimmer. She competed in the 2020 Summer Olympics.

== Personal bests ==
As of July 27, 2023

=== Long course (50-meter pool) ===
Event	Time	Meet	Date	Note(s)
50 m freestyle	24.41	2021 National Games of China	September 26, 2021	
100 m freestyle	53.26	2023 Chinese National Swimming Championships	May 3, 2023	
200 m freestyle	1:57.02	2023 Chinese National Swimming Championships	May 2, 2023	
50 m backstroke	29.68	2023 Chinese Spring National Swimming Championships	March 22, 2023	
100 m backstroke	1:01.45	2023 Chinese National Swimming Championships	May 3, 2023	
200 m backstroke	2:15.14	2021 Chinese National Swimming Championships	May 5, 2021	
200 m individual medley	2:20.02	2020 Chinese National Swimming Championships	October 1, 2020	

=== Short course (25-meter pool) ===
Event	Time	Meet	Date	Note(s)
50 m freestyle	23.90	2022 Chinese National Championships	October 27, 2022	
100 m freestyle	52.57	2022 Chinese National Championships	October 29, 2022	
200 m freestyle	1:55.91	2022 Chinese National Swimming Championships	October 28, 2022	

Key: NR = National Record; AS = Asian Record
