= Maha Al-Shehhi =

Emirati swimmer (born 2006)

Personal information
- Born: July 12, 2006 (age 20)

Sport
- Sport: Swimming
- Club: Al Nasr Sports Club

Maha Al-Shehhi (Arabic: مها الشحي; born 12 July 2006) is an Emirati swimmer. She competed in the Women's 200 metre freestyle at the 2024 Summer Olympics. Maha Al Shehhi finished 28th in the women's 200-metre freestyle heats at the Paris Olympics and clocked a time of 2.17.17 in the event. She managed to break her previous personal record of 2:17.37 by 0.20 seconds.

== Early life ==
Al-Shehhi was born in 2006, and is half-Polish and half-Emirati. When she was in third grade, her swimming instructor told her she was the first Emirati female swimmer he had seen. Female sportswomen are not common in the Arab world due to negative stigma.

== Career ==
In 2019, Al-Shehhi's team came in the third place in a swimming competition in Morocco. She also participated at the 2022 Asian Games in two events but failed to qualify for the final.
