= Batbayaryn Enkhtamir =

Mongolian swimmer

Personal information
- Nationality: Mongolian
- Born: 27 September 2004 (age 21) Ulaanbaatar, Mongolia

Sport
- Sport: Swimming

Batbayaryn Enkhtamir (Mongolian: Батбаярын Энхтамир); born 27 September 2004) is a Mongolian swimmer. He competed in the men's 100-metre freestyle at the 2024 Summer Olympics and set many records in records in Mongolian men's swimming.
