= Myagmaryn Delgerkhüü =

Mongolian olympian swimmer (born 1996)

Myagmaryn Delgerkhuu
Personal information
- Born: 21 September 1996 (age 30)

Sport
- Sport: Swimming

Myagmaryn Delgerkhüü (Mongolian: Мягмарын Дэлгэрхүү; born 21 September 1996) is a Mongolian swimmer. He competed in the Tokyo 2020 olympic game,men's 50 metre butterfly event at the 2017 World Aquatics Championships. In 2019, he represented Mongolia at the 2019 World Aquatics Championships held in Gwangju, South Korea and he finished in 72nd place in the heats in the men's 50 metre freestyle event. In the men's 100 metre freestyle he finished in 92nd place in the heats.
