= Mongolia at the 2011 World Aquatics Championships =

Sporting event delegation

Flag of Mongolia

Mongolia competed at the 2011 World Aquatics Championships in Shanghai, China between July 16 and 31, 2011.

== Swimming ==
Mongolia had 3 swimmers that competed.

Men

Athlete	Event	Heats		Semifinals		Final	
Athlete	Event	Time	Rank	Time	Rank	Time	Rank
Tamir Andrei	Men's 50m Freestyle	26.26	75	did not advance			
Tamir Andrei	Men's 100m Freestyle	57.52	82	did not advance			
Zandan Gunsennorou	Men's 50m Freestyle	28.14	94	did not advance			
Zandan Gunsennorou	Men's 100m Freestyle	1:01.80	91	did not advance			

Women

Athlete	Event	Heats		Semifinals		Final	
Athlete	Event	Time	Rank	Time	Rank	Time	Rank
Ouyngerel Gantumur	Women's 100m Breaststroke	1:28.86	44	did not advance			
Ouyngerel Gantumur	Women's 50m Butterfly	33.48	46	did not advance			
