= Batbayaryn Enkhkhüslen =

Mongolian swimmer (born 2001)

Personal information
- Nationality: Mongolian
- Born: 14 December 2001 (age 24) Ulaanbaatar, Mongolia

Sport
- Sport: Swimming

Batbayaryn Enkhkhüslen (Mongolian: Батбаярын Энххүслэн; born 14 December 2001) is a Mongolian swimmer. She competed in the women's 50 metre freestyle at the 2020 Summer Olympics and has set several records in Mongolian women's swimming.
