= Swimming at the 2022 Asian Games – Women's 400 metre freestyle =

Women's 400 metre freestyle at the 2022 Asian Games
- Venue: Hangzhou Olympic Expo Aquatics Center
- Date: 26 September 2023
- Competitors: 18 from 12 nations

Medalists
gold medal	Li Bingjie	China
silver medal	Ma Yonghui	China
bronze medal	Waka Kobori	Japan

The women's 400 metre freestyle event at the 2022 Asian Games took place on 26 September 2023 at the Hangzhou Olympic Expo Center.

== Schedule ==
All times are China Standard Time (UTC+08:00)

Date	Time	Event
Tuesday, 26 September 2023	11:13	Heats
Tuesday, 26 September 2023	20:33	Final

== Records ==
Prior to this competition, the existing world, Asian and Games records were as follows.

World Record	Ariarne Titmus (AUS)	3:55.38	Fukuoka, Japan	23 July 2023
Asian Record	Li Bingjie (CHN)	4:01.08	Tokyo, Japan	26 July 2021
Games Record	Wang Jianjiahe (CHN)	4:03.18	Jakarta, Indonesia	24 August 2018

== Results ==
Legend

- DNS — Did not start

=== Heats ===
Rank	Heat	Athlete	Time	Notes
1	2	Ma Yonghui (CHN)	4:09.76	
2	2	Waka Kobori (JPN)	4:10.27	
3	3	Li Bingjie (CHN)	4:13.10	
4	3	Diana Taszhanova (KAZ)	4:13.47	
5	3	Miyu Namba (JPN)	4:13.79	
6	2	Gan Ching Hwee (SGP)	4:17.50	
7	3	Kamonchanok Kwanmuang (THA)	4:17.97	
8	3	Han Da-kyung (KOR)	4:18.02	
9	2	Batbayaryn Enkhkhüslen (MGL)	4:21.69	
10	2	Võ Thị Mỹ Tiên (VIE)	4:22.90	
11	2	Tinky Ho (HKG)	4:23.68	
12	3	Chloe Cheng (HKG)	4:25.27	
13	2	Yarinda Sunthornrangsri (THA)	4:33.03	
14	1	Anna Nikishkina (KGZ)	4:38.71	
15	3	Jehanara Nabi (PAK)	4:39.28	
16	1	Amgalangiin Altannar (MGL)	4:45.10	
17	1	Maha Al-Shehhi (UAE)	4:55.46	
—	3	Ashley Lim (SGP)	DNS	

=== Final ===
Rank	Athlete	Time	Notes
1st place, gold medalist(s)	Li Bingjie (CHN)	4:01.96	GR
2nd place, silver medalist(s)	Ma Yonghui (CHN)	4:05.68	
3rd place, bronze medalist(s)	Waka Kobori (JPN)	4:07.81	
4	Miyu Namba (JPN)	4:09.48	
5	Diana Taszhanova (KAZ)	4:14.52	
6	Gan Ching Hwee (SGP)	4:15.30	
7	Kamonchanok Kwanmuang (THA)	4:15.56	
8	Han Da-kyung (KOR)	4:18.12	
