= Swimming at the 2018 Asian Games – Women's 400 metre freestyle =

Women's 400 metre freestyle at the 2018 Asian Games
- Venue: Gelora Bung Karno Aquatic Stadium
- Date: 24 August 2018
- Competitors: 16 from 10 nations

Medalists
gold medal	Wang Jianjiahe	China
silver medal	Li Bingjie	China
bronze medal	Chihiro Igarashi	Japan

The women's 400 metre freestyle event at the 2018 Asian Games took place on 24 August at the Gelora Bung Karno Aquatic Stadium.

== Schedule ==
All times are Western Indonesia Time (UTC+07:00)

Date	Time	Event
Friday, 24 August 2018	09:19	Heats
Friday, 24 August 2018	18:21	Final

== Records ==
Prior to this competition, the existing world, Asian and Games records were as follows.

World Record	Katie Ledecky (USA)	3:56.46	Rio de Janeiro, Brazil	7 August 2016
Asian Record	Li Bingjie (CHN)	4:01.75	Tianjin, China	1 September 2017
Games Record	Shao Yiwen (CHN)	4:05.58	Guangzhou, China	15 November 2010

== Results ==
Legend

- DNS — Did not start

=== Heats ===
Rank	Heat	Athlete	Time	Notes
1	2	Chihiro Igarashi (JPN)	4:15.89	
2	1	Wang Jianjiahe (CHN)	4:19.02	
3	1	Waka Kobori (JPN)	4:19.62	
4	1	Tinky Ho (HKG)	4:19.65	
5	1	Gan Ching Hwee (SGP)	4:19.70	
6	1	Katii Tang (HKG)	4:19.74	
7	2	Li Bingjie (CHN)	4:20.53	
8	2	Kim Jin-ha (KOR)	4:21.75	
9	2	Ammiga Himathongkom (THA)	4:23.76	
10	2	Chantal Liew (SGP)	4:29.47	
11	2	Adinda Larasati Dewi (INA)	4:29.56	
12	1	Sagita Putri Krisdewanti (INA)	4:30.06	
13	2	Mai Thị Linh (VIE)	4:31.99	
14	2	Erdeniin Tselmeg (MGL)	5:03.24	
—	1	Gabriella Doueihy (LBN)	DNS	
—	1	Choi Jung-min (KOR)	DNS	

=== Final ===
Rank	Athlete	Time	Notes
1st place, gold medalist(s)	Wang Jianjiahe (CHN)	4:03.18	GR
2nd place, silver medalist(s)	Li Bingjie (CHN)	4:06.46	
3rd place, bronze medalist(s)	Chihiro Igarashi (JPN)	4:08.48	
4	Waka Kobori (JPN)	4:11.69	
5	Kim Jin-ha (KOR)	4:16.84	
6	Gan Ching Hwee (SGP)	4:17.86	
7	Tinky Ho (HKG)	4:18.77	
8	Katii Tang (HKG)	4:19.91	
