= Swimming at the 2020 Summer Olympics – Women's 800 metre freestyle =

Women's 800 metre freestyle at the Games of the XXXII Olympiad
- Venue: Tokyo Aquatics Centre
- Dates: 29 July 2021 (heats); 31 July 2021 (final)
- Competitors: 30 from 22 nations
- Winning time: 8:12.57

Medalists
1st place, gold medalist(s)		Katie Ledecky	United States
2nd place, silver medalist(s)		Ariarne Titmus	Australia
3rd place, bronze medalist(s)		Simona Quadarella	Italy

The women's 800 metre freestyle event at the 2020 Summer Olympics was held from 29 to 31 July 2021 at the Tokyo Aquatics Centre. It was the event's 14th consecutive appearance, having been held at every edition since 1968.

Katie Ledecky won the gold medal, becoming the first person to win the event three consecutive times. At age 24, Ledecky became the oldest winner in the event after already being the youngest at the age of 15 in 2012.

== Summary ==
U.S. distance swimmer Katie Ledecky won her third consecutive Olympic title in this event, joining Australian Dawn Fraser (100 free, 1956-64) and Hungarian Krisztina Egerszegi (200 back, 1988-96) as the only female swimmers in Olympic history to three-peat an event. Dominating the race from the start, Ledecky fended off a late charge by Australia's Ariarne Titmus to win gold in 8:12.79—the 17th-fastest swim of all-time and of her career. Titmus, having bettered Ledecky in their 200 and 400 freestyle duels earlier in the week, lowered her Commonwealth record by almost two seconds to claim silver in 8:13.83.

Italy's Simona Quadarella edged out the U.S. 15-year-old Katie Grimes to earn bronze in 8:18.37. Grimes, the second-fastest qualifier into the final following her teammate Ledecky, was unable to replicate her heat time and settled for fourth place in 8:19.38. China's Wang Jianjiahe (8:21.93) and Titmus's teammate Kiah Melverton (8:22.25) picked up the fifth and sixth spots, respectively, finishing 31-hundredths of a second apart from each other. Germany's Sarah Köhler (8:24.56) and ROC's Anastasiia Kirpichnikova (8:26.30) rounded out the championship field.

== Records ==
Prior to this competition, the existing world and Olympic records were as follows.

World record	Katie Ledecky (USA)	8:04.79	Rio de Janeiro, Brazil	12 August 2016
Olympic record	Katie Ledecky (USA)	8:04.79	Rio de Janeiro, Brazil	12 August 2016

No new records were set during the competition.

== Qualification ==
The Olympic Qualifying Time for the event was 8:33.36. Up to two swimmers per National Olympic Committee (NOC) could automatically qualify by swimming that time at an approved qualification event. The Olympic Selection Time was 8:48.76. Up to one swimmer per NOC meeting that time was eligible for selection, allocated by world ranking until the maximum quota for all swimming events was reached. NOCs without a female swimmer qualified in any event could also use their universality place.

== Competition format ==
The competition consisted of two rounds: heats and a final. The swimmers with the best 8 times in the heats advanced to the final. Swim-offs were used as necessary to break ties for advancement to the next round.

== Schedule ==
All times are Japan Standard Time (UTC+9)

Date	Time	Round
29 July	19:00	Heats
31 July	10:46	Final

== Results ==
=== Heats ===
The swimmers with the top 8 times, regardless of heat, advanced to the final.

Rank	Heat	Lane	Swimmer	Nation	Time	Notes
1	4	4	Katie Ledecky	United States	8:15.67	Q
2	4	6	Katie Grimes	United States	8:17.05	Q
3	4	5	Simona Quadarella	Italy	8:17.32	Q
4	4	3	Sarah Köhler	Germany	8:17.33	Q
5	3	6	Anastasiya Kirpichnikova	ROC	8:18.77	Q, NR
6	3	5	Ariarne Titmus	Australia	8:18.99	Q
7	3	3	Kiah Melverton	Australia	8:20.45	Q
8	3	4	Wang Jianjiahe	China	8:20.58	Q
9	3	8	Isabel Gose	Germany	8:21.79	
10	3	1	Li Bingjie	China	8:22.49	
11	2	3	Summer McIntosh	Canada	8:25.04	
12	4	8	Merve Tuncel	Turkey	8:25.62	
13	3	2	Ajna Késely	Hungary	8:26.20	
14	4	7	Mireia Belmonte	Spain	8:26.71	
15	2	6	Julia Hassler	Liechtenstein	8:26.99	NR
16	2	5	Waka Kobori	Japan	8:28.90	
17	2	4	Miyu Namba	Japan	8:32.04	
18	1	3	Eve Thomas	New Zealand	8:32.51	
19	1	4	Kristel Köbrich	Chile	8:32.58	
20	4	2	Martina Caramignoli	Italy	8:33.15	
21	2	7	Jimena Pérez	Spain	8:33.98	
22	2	8	Marlene Kahler	Austria	8:36.16	
23	2	1	Deniz Ertan	Turkey	8:36.29	
24	1	5	Viviane Jungblut	Brazil	8:38.88	
25	2	2	Tamila Holub	Portugal	8:40.04	
26	1	6	Katja Fain	Slovenia	8:41.13	
27	3	7	Delfina Pignatiello	Argentina	8:44.85	
28	1	2	Han Da-kyung	South Korea	8:46.66	
29	1	1	Arianna Valloni	San Marino	8:54.78	
30	1	7	Nguyễn Thị Ánh Viên	Vietnam	9:03.56	
	4	1	Anna Egorova	ROC	DNS	

=== Final ===
Rank	Lane	Swimmer	Nation	Time	Notes
1st place, gold medalist(s)	4	Katie Ledecky	United States	8:12.57	
2nd place, silver medalist(s)	7	Ariarne Titmus	Australia	8:13.83	OC
3rd place, bronze medalist(s)	3	Simona Quadarella	Italy	8:18.35	
4	5	Katie Grimes	United States	8:19.38	
5	8	Wang Jianjiahe	China	8:21.93	
6	1	Kiah Melverton	Australia	8:22.25	
7	6	Sarah Köhler	Germany	8:24.56	
8	2	Anastasiya Kirpichnikova	ROC	8:26.30	

== See also ==
- Swimming at the 2020 Summer Olympics – Men's 800 metre freestyle
