= Swimming at the 2022 Asian Games – Women's 800 metre freestyle =

Women's 800 metre freestyle at the 2022 Asian Games
- Venue: Hangzhou Olympic Expo Aquatics Center
- Date: 29 September 2023
- Competitors: 18 from 12 nations

Medalists
gold medal	Li Bingjie	China
silver medal	Waka Kobori	Japan
bronze medal	Yang Peiqi	China

The women's 800 metre freestyle event at the 2022 Asian Games took place on 29 September 2023 at the Hangzhou Olympic Expo Center.

== Schedule ==
All times are China Standard Time (UTC+08:00)

Date	Time	Event
Friday, 29 September 2023	10:22	Slow heats
Friday, 29 September 2023	19:42	Fast heat

== Records ==
Prior to this competition, the existing world, Asian and Games records were as follows.

World Record	Katie Ledecky (USA)	8:04.79	Rio de Janeiro, Brazil	12 August 2016
Asian Record	Li Bingjie (CHN)	8:13.31	Fukuoka, Japan	29 July 2023
Games Record	Wang Jianjiahe (CHN)	8:18.55	Jakarta, Indonesia	23 August 2018

== Results ==
Rank	Heat	Athlete	Time	Notes
1st place, gold medalist(s)	3	Li Bingjie (CHN)	8:20.01	
2nd place, silver medalist(s)	3	Waka Kobori (JPN)	8:28.78	
3rd place, bronze medalist(s)	3	Yang Peiqi (CHN)	8:35.47	
4	3	Gan Ching Hwee (SGP)	8:37.54	
5	3	Miyu Namba (JPN)	8:39.34	
6	3	Han Da-kyung (KOR)	8:45.39	
7	2	Diana Taszhanova (KAZ)	8:48.46	
8	2	Kamonchanok Kwanmuang (THA)	8:51.65	
9	3	Võ Thị Mỹ Tiên (VIE)	8:59.16	
10	2	Nip Tsz Yin (HKG)	9:00.74	
11	3	Ashley Lim (SGP)	9:04.45	
12	2	Mok Sze Ki (HKG)	9:10.91	
13	2	Vritti Agarwal (IND)	9:15.99	
14	2	Yarinda Sunthornrangsri (THA)	9:21.10	
15	2	Jehanara Nabi (PAK)	9:34.78	
16	1	Anna Nikishkina (KGZ)	9:35.91	
17	1	Amgalangiin Altannar (MGL)	9:53.06	
18	1	Ganbaataryn Nomuunaa (MGL)	10:22.79	
