= 2022 FINA World Swimming Championships (25 m) – Women's 400 metre freestyle =

Swimming competition

Women's 400 metre freestyle at the 2022 FINA World Swimming Championships (25 m)
- Venue: Melbourne Sports and Aquatic Centre
- Location: Melbourne, Australia
- Dates: 13 December (heats and final)
- Competitors: 28 from 24 nations
- Winning time: 3:55.04

Medalists
gold medal	Lani Pallister	Australia
silver medal	Erika Fairweather	New Zealand
bronze medal	Leah Smith	United States

The Women's 400 metre freestyle competition of the 2022 FINA World Swimming Championships (25 m) was held on 13 December 2022.

== Records ==
Prior to the competition, the existing world and championship records were as follows.

World record	Li Bingjie (CHN)	3:51.30	Beijing, China	27 October 2022
Competition record	Ariarne Titmus (AUS)	3:53.92	Hangzhou, China	14 December 2018

== Results ==
=== Heats ===
The heats were started at 11:05.

Rank	Heat	Lane	Name	Nationality	Time	Notes
1	4	2	Erika Fairweather	New Zealand	3:58.27	Q
2	3	4	Lani Pallister	Australia	3:59.50	Q
3	4	3	Erin Gemmell	United States	4:00.49	Q
4	3	6	Leah Smith	United States	4:00.71	Q
5	4	5	Miyu Namba	Japan	4:00.97	Q
6	4	7	Waka Kobori	Japan	4:02.05	Q
7	3	7	Katja Fain	Slovenia	4:02.13	Q
8	3	3	Leah Neale	Australia	4:02.30	Q
9	3	5	Liu Yaxin	China	4:02.36	
10	3	1	Helena Rosendahl Bach	Denmark	4:03.59	
11	4	8	Imani de Jong	Netherlands	4:04.65	
12	4	6	Valentine Dumont	Belgium	4:07.37	
13	4	1	Gabrielle Roncatto	Brazil	4:08.39	
14	2	4	Alexa Reyna	France	4:08.44	
15	2	6	Anja Crevar	Serbia	4:08.62	
16	3	8	Silke Holkenborg	Netherlands	4:08.75	
17	3	2	Merve Tuncel	Turkey	4:10.60	
18	2	2	Elisbet Gámez	Cuba	4:11.66	
19	1	4	Stephanie Houtman	South Africa	4:13.16	
20	2	3	Paula Otero	Spain	4:14.08	
21	2	1	Ho Nam Wai	Hong Kong	4:14.15	
22	2	8	Vár Erlingsdóttir Eidesgaard	Faroe Islands	4:16.97	
23	1	5	Martina Cibulková	Slovakia	4:19.76	
24	2	7	Iman Avdić	Bosnia and Herzegovina	4:21.65	
25	1	6	Jehanara Nabi	Pakistan	4:25.36	
26	1	3	Natalia Kuipers	United States Virgin Islands	4:26.11	
27	1	2	Kaltra Meca	Albania	4:31.99	
28	1	7	Amaya Bollinger	Guam	5:04.88	
	1	1	Maha Al-Shehhi	United Arab Emirates	Did not start	
	2	5	Gan Ching Hwee	Singapore	Did not start	
	4	4	Li Bingjie	China	Did not start	

=== Final ===
The final was held at 19:35.

Rank	Lane	Name	Nationality	Time	Notes
1st place, gold medalist(s)	5	Lani Pallister	Australia	3:55.04	
2nd place, silver medalist(s)	4	Erika Fairweather	New Zealand	3:56.00	
3rd place, bronze medalist(s)	6	Leah Smith	United States	3:59.78	
4	2	Miyu Namba	Japan	4:01.13	
5	1	Katja Fain	Slovenia	4:01.46	NR
6	3	Erin Gemmell	United States	4:01.82	
7	7	Waka Kobori	Japan	4:02.14	
8	8	Leah Neale	Australia	4:03.45	
