= Swimming at the 2026 Asian Games – Women's 1500 metre freestyle =

Women's 1500 metre freestyle at the 2026 Asian Games
- Venue: Tokyo Aquatics Centre
- Date: 20 September 2026
- Competitors: 11 from 7 nations

Medalists
gold medal	Li Bingjie	China
silver medal	Gan Ching Hwee	Singapore
bronze medal	Ichika Kajimoto	Japan

The women's 1500 metre freestyle event at the 2026 Asian Games took place on 20 September 2026 at the Tokyo Aquatics Centre.

== Schedule ==
All times are Japan Standard Time (UTC+09:00)

Date	Time	Event
Sunday, 20 September 2026	10:20	Slow heat
Sunday, 20 September 2026	17:18	Fast heat

== Records ==
Prior to this competition, the existing world, Asian and Games records were as follows.

World Record	Katie Ledecky (USA)	15:20.48	Indianapolis, United States	16 May 2018
Asian Record	Wang Jianjiahe (CHN)	15:41.49	Tokyo, Japan	26 July 2021
Games Record	Li Bingjie (CHN)	15:51.18	Hangzhou, China	24 September 2023

== Results ==
=== Final ===
Rank	Heat	Athlete	Time	Notes
1st place, gold medalist(s)	2	Li Bingjie (CHN)	15:53.52	
2nd place, silver medalist(s)	2	Gan Ching Hwee (SGP)	16:00.45	NR
3rd place, bronze medalist(s)	2	Ichika Kajimoto (JPN)	16:06.83	
4	2	Kim Chae-yun (KOR)	16:31.87	
5	2	Gao Weizhong (CHN)	16:37.00	
6	2	Thitirat Charoensup (THA)	17:17.22	
7	1	En Xi Sarah Sim (SGP)	17:21.51	
8	2	Pac Tung Nikita Lam (HKG)	17:25.17	
9	1	Gilaine Ma (HKG)	17:37.48	
10	1	Sana Lefalher (BRN)	17:57.23	
	2	Han Da-kyung (KOR)	DNS	
