= Swimming at the 2018 Asian Games – Women's 1500 metre freestyle =

Women's 1500 metre freestyle at the 2018 Asian Games
- Venue: Gelora Bung Karno Aquatic Stadium
- Date: 19 August 2018
- Competitors: 11 from 8 nations

Medalists
gold medal	Wang Jianjiahe	China
silver medal	Li Bingjie	China
bronze medal	Waka Kobori	Japan

The women's 1500 metre freestyle event at the 2018 Asian Games took place on 19 August at the Gelora Bung Karno Aquatic Stadium.

== Schedule ==
All times are Western Indonesia Time (UTC+07:00)

Date	Time	Event
Sunday, 19 August 2018	09:00	Slowest heat
Sunday, 19 August 2018	18:00	Fastest heat

== Records ==
Prior to this competition, the existing world, Asian and Games records were as follows.

World Record	Katie Ledecky (USA)	15:20.48	Indianapolis, United States	16 May 2018
Asian Record	Li Bingjie (CHN)	15:52.87	Tianjin, China	3 September 2017
Games Record	—	—	—	—

== Results ==
Legend

- DNS — Did not start

Rank	Heat	Athlete	Time	Notes
1st place, gold medalist(s)	2	Wang Jianjiahe (CHN)	15:53.68	GR
2nd place, silver medalist(s)	2	Li Bingjie (CHN)	15:53.80	
3rd place, bronze medalist(s)	2	Waka Kobori (JPN)	16:18.31	
4	2	Yukimi Moriyama (JPN)	16:34.23	
5	2	Gan Ching Hwee (SGP)	16:39.70	
6	2	Han Da-kyung (KOR)	16:58.57	
7	1	Katii Tang (HKG)	17:08.39	
8	2	Lam Hoi Kiu (HKG)	17:20.65	
9	1	Gabriella Doueihy (LBN)	17:37.77	
10	1	Mai Thị Linh (VIE)	17:40.56	
—	2	Ressa Kania Dewi (INA)	DNS	
