= Swimming at the 2026 Asian Games – Women's 400 metre freestyle =

Women's 400 metre freestyle at the 2026 Asian Games
- Venue: Tokyo Aquatics Centre
- Date: 22 September 2026
- Competitors: 16 from 10 nations

Medalists
gold medal	Li Bingjie	China
silver medal	Gan Ching Hwee	Singapore
bronze medal	Ichika Kajimoto	Japan

The women's 400 metre freestyle event at the 2026 Asian Games took place on 22 September 2026 at the Tokyo Aquatics Centre. China's Li Bingjie won the gold medal in a time of 4:02.71.

== Schedule ==
All times are Japan Standard Time (UTC+09:00)

Date	Time	Event
Tuesday, 22 September 2026	11:17	Heats
Tuesday, 22 September 2026	18:02	Final

== Records ==
Prior to this competition, the existing world, Asian and Games records were as follows.

World Record	Summer McIntosh (CAN)	3:54.18	Victoria, Canada	7 June 2025
Asian Record	Li Bingjie (CHN)	3:58.21	Singapore	27 July 2025
Games Record	Li Bingjie (CHN)	4:01.96	Hangzhou, China	26 September 2023

== Results ==
=== Heats ===
Rank	Heat	Athlete	Time	Notes
1	1	Waka Kobori (JPN)	4:10.98	Q
2	1	Yang Peiqi (CHN)	4:11.02	Q
3	2	Li Bingjie (CHN)	4:11.38	Q
4	2	Ichika Kajimoto (JPN)	4:12.66	Q
5	2	Gan Ching Hwee (SGP)	4:13.05	Q
6	1	Han Da-kyung (KOR)	4:14.54	Q
7	2	Gilaine Ma (HKG)	4:18.23	Q
8	2	Kamonchanok Kwanmuang (THA)	4:20.31	Q
9	2	Victoria Lim (SGP)	4:20.51	Q
10	1	Kim Chae-yun (KOR)	4:20.62	Q
11	1	Wang Xintong (HKG)	4:23.09	Reserve
12	2	Maria Nedelko (THA)	4:25.29	Reserve
13	1	Aiymkyz Aidaralieva (KGZ)	4:26.49	
14	1	Enkhkhuslen Batbayar (MGL)	4:32.86	
15	2	Sana Lefalher (BRN)	4:34.19	
16	1	Orgilmaa Badrakh (MGL)	4:49.73	

=== Final ===
Rank	Athlete	Time	Notes
1st place, gold medalist(s)	Li Bingjie (CHN)	4:02.71	
2nd place, silver medalist(s)	Gan Ching Hwee (SGP)	4:06.81	NR
3rd place, bronze medalist(s)	Ichika Kajimoto (JPN)	4:07.45	
4	Yang Peiqi (CHN)	4:07.63	
5	Waka Kobori (JPN)	4:09.53	
6	Han Da-kyung (KOR)	4:12.49	
7	Gilaine Ma (HKG)	4:15.03	
8	Kim Chae-yun (KOR)	4:15.69	
9	Kamonchanok Kwanmuang (THA)	4:21.95	
10	Victoria Lim (SGP)	4:23.40	
