= Swimming at the 2026 Asian Games – Women's 800 metre freestyle =

Women's 800 metre freestyle at the 2026 Asian Games
- Venue: Tokyo Aquatics Centre
- Date: 25 September 2026
- Competitors: 15 from 10 nations

Medalists
gold medal	Li Bingjie	China
silver medal	Gan Ching Hwee	Singapore
bronze medal	Ichika Kajimoto	Japan

The women's 800 metre freestyle event at the 2026 Asian Games took place on 25 September 2026 at the Tokyo Aquatics Centre.

== Schedule ==
All times are Japan Standard Time (UTC+09:00)

Date	Time	Event
Friday, 25 September 2026	10:17	Heat B
Friday, 25 September 2026	17:25	Heat A

== Records ==
Prior to this competition, the existing world, Asian and Games records were as follows.

World Record	Katie Ledecky (USA)	8:04.12	Fort Lauderdale, United States	3 May 2025
Asian Record	Li Bingjie (CHN)	8:13.31	Fukuoka, Japan	29 July 2023
Games Record	Wang Jianjiahe (CHN)	8:18.55	Jakarta, Indonesia	23 August 2018

== Results ==
=== Final ===
Rank	Heat	Athlete	Time	Notes
1st place, gold medalist(s)	A	Li Bingjie (CHN)	8:24.02	
2nd place, silver medalist(s)	A	Gan Ching Hwee (SGP)	8:26.25	NR
3rd place, bronze medalist(s)	A	Ichika Kajimoto (JPN)	8:27.37	
4	A	Yang Peiqi (CHN)	8:36.66	
5	A	Ruka Takezawa (JPN)	8:41.62	
6	A	Kim Chae-yun (KOR)	8:42.28	
7	A	Ma Gilaine (HKG)	8:55.63	
8	A	Gao Jialian Candice (HKG)	8:57.77	
9	B	Sarah Sim En Xi (SGP)	9:13.62	
10	B	Sana Lefalher (BRN)	9:27.33	
11	B	Altannar Amgalan (MGL)	10:23.84	
12	B	Misheel Shinebayar (MGL)	11:44.93	
	B	Han Da-kyung (KOR)	DNS	
	B	Kamonchanok Kwanmuang (THA)	DNS	
