= Swimming at the 2018 Asian Games – Women's 800 metre freestyle =

Women's 800 metre freestyle at the 2018 Asian Games
- Venue: Gelora Bung Karno Aquatic Stadium
- Date: 23 August 2018
- Competitors: 16 from 10 nations

Medalists
| gold medal | Wang Jianjiahe | China |
| silver medal | Li Bingjie | China |
| bronze medal | Waka Kobori | Japan |

The women's 800 metre freestyle event at the 2018 Asian Games took place on 23 August at the Gelora Bung Karno Aquatic Stadium.

== Schedule ==
All times are Western Indonesia Time (UTC+07:00)

| Date | Time | Event |
|---|---|---|
| Thursday, 23 August 2018 | 09:38 | Slowest heat |
| Thursday, 23 August 2018 | 18:37 | Fastest heat |

== Records ==
Prior to this competition, the existing world, Asian and Games records were as follows.

| World Record | Katie Ledecky (USA) | 8:04.79 | Rio de Janeiro, Brazil | 12 August 2016 |
| Asian Record | Li Bingjie (CHN) | 8:15.46 | Budapest, Hungary | 29 July 2017 |
| Games Record | Li Xuanxu (CHN) | 8:23.55 | Guangzhou, China | 17 November 2010 |

== Results ==
| Rank | Heat | Athlete | Time | Notes |
|---|---|---|---|---|
| 1st place, gold medalist(s) | 2 | Wang Jianjiahe (CHN) | 8:18.55 | GR |
| 2nd place, silver medalist(s) | 2 | Li Bingjie (CHN) | 8:28.14 | |
| 3rd place, bronze medalist(s) | 2 | Waka Kobori (JPN) | 8:30.65 | |
| 4 | 2 | Yukimi Moriyama (JPN) | 8:40.71 | |
| 5 | 2 | Gan Ching Hwee (SGP) | 8:47.07 | |
| 6 | 2 | Han Da-kyung (KOR) | 8:48.38 | |
| 7 | 1 | Tinky Ho (HKG) | 8:53.16 | |
| 8 | 2 | Ammiga Himathongkom (THA) | 8:53.47 | |
| 9 | 2 | Choi Jung-min (KOR) | 9:01.36 | |
| 10 | 1 | Adinda Larasati Dewi (INA) | 9:04.25 | |
| 11 | 1 | Lam Hoi Kiu (HKG) | 9:04.91 | |
| 12 | 1 | Ressa Kania Dewi (INA) | 9:06.48 | |
| 13 | 1 | Chantal Liew (SGP) | 9:13.87 | |
| 14 | 1 | Mai Thị Linh (VIE) | 9:18.91 | |
| 15 | 1 | Gabriella Doueihy (LBN) | 9:23.22 | |
| 16 | 1 | Erdeniin Tselmeg (MGL) | 10:22.18 | |
