= Swimming at the 2018 Asian Games – Women's 4 × 200 metre freestyle relay =

Women's 4 × 200 metre freestyle relay at the 2018 Asian Games
- Venue: Gelora Bung Karno Aquatic Stadium
- Date: 21 August 2018
- Competitors: 46 from 9 nations

Medalists
gold medal	China; Li Bingjie, Wang Jianjiahe, Zhang Yuhan, Yang Junxuan, Shen Duo, Ai Yanhan, Wu Yue
silver medal	Japan; Chihiro Igarashi, Rikako Ikee, Yui Ohashi, Rio Shirai, Waka Kobori, Sachi Mochida
bronze medal	Hong Kong; Tinky Ho, Camille Cheng, Katii Tang, Sze Hang Yu, Jamie Yeung, Natalie Kan, Chan Kin Lok

The women's 4 × 200 metre freestyle relay event at the 2018 Asian Games took place on 21 August at the Gelora Bung Karno Aquatic Stadium, Jakarta, Indonesia.

== Schedule ==
All times are Western Indonesia Time (UTC+07:00)

Date	Time	Event
Tuesday, 21 August 2018	10:18	Heats
Tuesday, 21 August 2018	19:32	Final

== Records ==
Prior to this competition, the existing world, Asian and Games records were as follows.

World Record	China	7:42.08	Rome, Italy	30 July 2009
Asian Record	China	7:42.08	Rome, Italy	30 July 2009
Games Record	China	7:51.81	Guangzhou, China	16 November 2010

== Results ==
=== Heats ===
Rank	Heat	Team	Time	Notes
1	2	China (CHN)	8:01.41	
		Shen Duo	2:00.30	
		Ai Yanhan	2:00.51	
		Wu Yue	2:00.44	
		Zhang Yuhan	2:00.16	
2	1	Japan (JPN)	8:05.21	
		Waka Kobori	2:01.81	
		Rio Shirai	2:01.17	
		Chihiro Igarashi	1:59.40	
		Sachi Mochida	2:02.83	
3	1	South Korea (KOR)	8:25.14	
		Kim Jin-ha	2:05.75	
		Im Da-sol	2:07.65	
		Han Da-kyung	2:07.32	
		Choi Jung-min	2:04.42	
4	2	Singapore (SGP)	8:25.66	
		Gan Ching Hwee	2:03.72	
		Cherlyn Yeoh	2:06.96	
		Marina Chan	2:06.74	
		Christie Chue	2:08.24	
5	2	Hong Kong (HKG)	8:32.69	
		Katii Tang	2:03.91	
		Jamie Yeung	2:06.21	
		Natalie Kan	2:06.84	
		Chan Kin Lok	2:15.73	
6	2	Indonesia (INA)	8:34.05	
		Patricia Yosita Hapsari	2:09.56	
		Ressa Kania Dewi	2:05.22	
		Adinda Larasati Dewi	2:09.34	
		Sagita Putri Krisdewanti	2:09.93	
7	1	Thailand (THA)	8:52.10	Withdrew
		Manita Sathianchokwisan	2:09.14	
		Ammiga Himathongkom	2:08.35	
		Araya Wongvat	2:20.13	
		Natthanan Junkrajang	2:14.48	
8	1	Macau (MAC)	9:03.42	
		Tan Chi Yan	2:12.44	
		Choi Weng Tong	2:18.83	
		Long Chi Wai	2:17.27	
		Erica Vong	2:14.88	
9	2	Mongolia (MGL)	9:37.23	Advanced
		Batbayaryn Enkhkhüslen	2:17.57	
		Khuyagbaataryn Enkhzul	2:22.55	
		Altanshagain Kherlen	2:32.47	
		Erdeniin Tselmeg	2:24.64	

=== Final ===
Rank	Team	Time	Notes
1st place, gold medalist(s)	China (CHN)	7:48.61	GR
	Li Bingjie	1:56.94	
	Wang Jianjiahe	1:55.35	
	Zhang Yuhan	1:58.37	
	Yang Junxuan	1:57.95	
2nd place, silver medalist(s)	Japan (JPN)	7:53.83	
	Chihiro Igarashi	1:57.69	
	Rikako Ikee	1:55.27	
	Yui Ohashi	2:01.33	
	Rio Shirai	1:59.54	
3rd place, bronze medalist(s)	Hong Kong (HKG)	8:07.17	
	Tinky Ho	2:02.12	
	Camille Cheng	2:00.85	
	Katii Tang	2:01.68	
	Sze Hang Yu	2:02.52	
4	South Korea (KOR)	8:14.36	
	Choi Jung-min	2:03.32	
	Kim Jin-ha	2:01.81	
	Ko Mi-so	2:03.73	
	Han Da-kyung	2:05.50	
5	Singapore (SGP)	8:15.12	
	Quah Ting Wen	2:02.43	
	Christie Chue	2:02.95	
	Cherlyn Yeoh	2:06.60	
	Gan Ching Hwee	2:03.14	
6	Indonesia (INA)	8:21.51	
	Sagita Putri Krisdewanti	2:06.23	
	Ressa Kania Dewi	2:03.98	
	Patricia Yosita Hapsari	2:05.68	
	Adinda Larasati Dewi	2:05.62	
7	Macau (MAC)	8:57.83	
	Tan Chi Yan	2:11.90	
	Choi Weng Tong	2:15.98	
	Long Chi Wai	2:15.29	
	Erica Vong	2:14.66	
8	Mongolia (MGL)	9:24.96	
	Batbayaryn Enkhkhüslen	2:09.53	
	Khuyagbaataryn Enkhzul	2:21.54	
	Altanshagain Kherlen	2:30.01	
	Erdeniin Tselmeg	2:23.88	
