= 2021 FINA World Swimming Championships (25 m) – Women's 400 metre freestyle =

Swimming competition

Women's 400 metre freestyle at the 2021 FINA World Swimming Championships (25 m)
- Venue: Etihad Arena
- Location: Abu Dhabi, United Arab Emirates
- Dates: 19 December (heats and final)
- Competitors: 45 from 38 nations
- Winning time: 3:55.83

Medalists
gold medal	Li Bingjie	China
silver medal	Summer McIntosh	Canada
bronze medal	Siobhán Haughey	Hong Kong

The Women's 400 metre freestyle competition of the 2021 FINA World Swimming Championships (25 m) was held on 19 December 2021.

== Records ==
Prior to the competition, the existing world and championship records were as follows.

World record	Ariarne Titmus (AUS)	3:53.92	Hangzhou, China	14 December 2018
Competition record	Ariarne Titmus (AUS)	3:53.92	Hangzhou, China	14 December 2018

== Results ==
=== Heats ===
The heats were started at 10:14.

Rank	Heat	Lane	Name	Nationality	Time	Notes
1	5	7	Li Bingjie	China	4:01.26	Q
2	5	5	Anastasiya Kirpichnikova	Russian Swimming Federation	4:01.35	Q
3	5	4	Summer McIntosh	Canada	4:01.82	Q
4	4	4	Siobhán Haughey	Hong Kong	4:02.57	Q
5	5	2	Anna Egorova	Russian Swimming Federation	4:02.66	Q
6	4	7	Paige Madden	United States	4:03.03	Q
7	4	3	Isabel Marie Gose	Germany	4:03.13	Q
8	3	5	Joanna Evans	Bahamas	4:03.58	Q
9	5	6	Ajna Késely	Hungary	4:03.84	
10	4	5	Simona Quadarella	Italy	4:03.93	
11	4	2	Freya Anderson	Great Britain	4:03.94	
12	5	0	Nathalia Almeida	Brazil	4:06.13	
13	3	2	Emma Weyant	United States	4:06.71	
14	5	1	Martina Caramignoli	Italy	4:06.89	
15	5	8	Merve Tuncel	Turkey	4:07.39	
16	2	1	Anja Crevar	Serbia	4:07.49	NR
17	5	9	Han Da-kyung	South Korea	4:08.52	
18	3	9	Elisbet Gámez	Cuba	4:09.08	
19	4	1	Beril Böcekler	Turkey	4:09.16	
20	4	6	Valentine Dumont	Belgium	4:09.35	
21	4	0	Leonie Kullmann	Germany	4:09.41	
22	5	3	Charlotte Bonnet	France	4:10.10	
23	4	8	Gabrielle Roncatto	Brazil	4:10.34	
24	3	7	Monique Olivier	Luxembourg	4:10.57	
25	3	4	Ryu Ji-won	South Korea	4:11.06	
26	3	1	Lena Opatril	Austria	4:11.95	
27	2	2	Zhanet Angelova	Bulgaria	4:12.58	
27	4	9	Diana Durães	Portugal	4:12.58	
29	2	4	María de Valdés	Spain	4:12.86	
30	3	6	Laura Lahtinen	Finland	4:16.77	
31	3	0	Michaela Pulford	South Africa	4:17.27	
32	2	5	Delfina Dini	Argentina	4:17.51	
33	1	5	Daniela Alfaro	Costa Rica	4:18.79	
34	2	3	Iman Avdić	Bosnia and Herzegovina	4:19.54	
35	2	0	Arianna Valloni	San Marino	4:21.54	
36	2	7	Sasha Gatt	Malta	4:21.65	
36	3	8	Matea Sumajstorčić	Croatia	4:21.65	
38	2	8	Eva Petrovska	North Macedonia	4:26.38	
39	1	6	Natalia Kuipers	United States Virgin Islands	4:26.48	
40	2	9	Fatima Alkaramova	Azerbaijan	4:29.12	
41	1	4	Michell Ramírez	Honduras	4:31.26	
42	1	2	Katie Rock	Albania	4:35.55	
43	1	7	Alexia Savinova	Moldova	4:37.13	
44	1	1	Bianca Mitchell	Antigua and Barbuda	4:37.56	
45	1	8	Keana Santos	Guam	5:04.07	
	1	3	Talita Te Flan	Ivory Coast	DNS	
	2	6	Sabína Kupčová	Slovakia	DNS	
	3	3	Quah Jing Wen	Singapore	DNS	

=== Final ===
The final was held at 18:49.

Rank	Lane	Name	Nationality	Time	Notes
1st place, gold medalist(s)	4	Li Bingjie	China	3:55.83	
2nd place, silver medalist(s)	3	Summer McIntosh	Canada	3:57.87	
3rd place, bronze medalist(s)	6	Siobhán Haughey	Hong Kong	3:58.12	
4	5	Anastasiya Kirpichnikova	Russian Swimming Federation	3:58.56	
5	7	Paige Madden	United States	3:59.58	
6	1	Isabel Marie Gose	Germany	4:00.82	
7	8	Joanna Evans	Bahamas	4:01.09	
8	2	Anna Egorova	Russian Swimming Federation	4:02.11	
