= Swimming at the 2020 Summer Olympics – Women's 400 metre freestyle =

Women's 400 metre freestyle at the Games of the XXXII Olympiad
- Venue: Tokyo Aquatics Centre
- Dates: 25 July 2021 (heats); 26 July 2021 (final)
- Competitors: 26 from 19 nations
- Winning time: 3:56.69

Medalists
1st place, gold medalist(s)		Ariarne Titmus	Australia
2nd place, silver medalist(s)		Katie Ledecky	United States
3rd place, bronze medalist(s)		Li Bingjie	China

The women's 400 metre freestyle event at the 2020 Summer Olympics was held from 25 to 26 July 2021 at the Tokyo Aquatics Centre. It was the event's twenty-third consecutive appearance, having been held at every edition since 1924.

== Summary ==
In one of the most anticipated races at these Games, Australia's Ariarne Titmus came from behind to hand the U.S.' defending Olympic champion Katie Ledecky her first-ever individual Olympic loss and become the first Australian to win the event since Shane Gould in 1972. Trailing Ledecky by nearly a body length at the halfway mark, Titmus launched a blistering final hundred to win the gold in 3:56.69, registering the second fastest time in history. While Ledecky took the early lead, she was unable to overtake Titmus in the final lap, settling for the silver in 3:57.36.

Meanwhile, China's Li Bingjie reset her Asian Record for the second time in as many days to take the bronze nearly four seconds back in 4:01.08. Whilst Canada's Summer McIntosh was third at the final turn, she faded down the stretch to finish fourth in a Canadian Record of 4:02.42. China's Tang Muhan (4:04.10), Germany's Isabel Gose (4:04.98), the U.S. Paige Madden (4:06.81) and New Zealand's Erika Fairweather (4:08:81) rounded out the championship field, with all four swimmers slower than their preliminary times.

The medals for competition were presented by John Coates, IOC Vice-President, and the gifts were presented by Penny Heyns, FINA Bureau Member.

== Records ==
Prior to this competition, the existing world and Olympic records were as follows.

World record	Katie Ledecky (USA)	3:56.46	Rio de Janeiro, Brazil	7 August 2016
Olympic record	Katie Ledecky (USA)	3:56.46	Rio de Janeiro, Brazil	7 August 2016

No new records were set during the competition.

== Qualification ==
The Olympic Qualifying Time for the event was 4:07.90. Up to two swimmers per National Olympic Committee (NOC) could automatically qualify by swimming that time at an approved qualification event. The Olympic Selection Time was 4:15.34. Up to one swimmer per NOC meeting that time was eligible for selection, allocated by world ranking until the maximum quota for all swimming events was reached. NOCs without a female swimmer qualified in any event could also use their universality place.

== Competition format ==
The competition consisted of two rounds: heats and a final. The swimmers with the best 8 times in the heats advanced to the final. Swim-offs were to be used as necessary to break ties for advancement to the next round.

== Schedule ==
All times are Japan standard time (UTC+9)

Date	Time	Round
Sunday, 25 July 2021	20:06	Heats
Monday, 26 July 2021	11:20	Final

== Results ==
=== Heats ===
The swimmers with the top 8 times, regardless of heat, advanced to the final.

Rank	Heat	Lane	Swimmer	Nation	Time	Notes
1	3	4	Katie Ledecky	United States	4:00.45	Q
2	3	5	Li Bingjie	China	4:01.57	Q, AS
3	4	4	Ariarne Titmus	Australia	4:01.66	Q
4	4	8	Erika Fairweather	New Zealand	4:02.28	Q, NR
5	3	6	Summer McIntosh	Canada	4:02.72	Q, NR
6	3	2	Isabel Gose	Germany	4:03.21	Q, NR
7	4	6	Paige Madden	United States	4:03.98	Q
8	4	2	Tang Muhan	China	4:04.07	Q
9	4	3	Tamsin Cook	Australia	4:04.80	
10	4	5	Ajna Késely	Hungary	4:05.34	
11	4	1	Waka Kobori	Japan	4:05.57	
12	2	3	Julia Hassler	Liechtenstein	4:06.98	NR
13	2	5	Joanna Evans	Bahamas	4:07.50	
14	3	7	Anastasiya Kirpichnikova	ROC	4:08.01	
15	3	3	Anna Egorova	ROC	4:08.24	
16	3	8	Beril Böcekler	Turkey	4:08.27	
17	2	6	Marlene Kahler	Austria	4:08.37	NR
18	4	7	Leonie Kullmann	Germany	4:10.25	
19	2	4	Merve Tuncel	Turkey	4:11.06	
20	3	1	Miyu Namba	Japan	4:13.49	
21	2	2	Han Da-kyung	South Korea	4:16.49	
22	2	7	Sasha Gatt	Malta	4:19.75	
23	2	1	Tiana Rabarijaona	Madagascar	4:28.41	
24	1	4	Eda Zeqiri	Kosovo	4:38.02	
25	1	5	Talita Te Flan	Ivory Coast	4:38.92	
26	1	3	Natalia Kuipers	Virgin Islands	4:39.42	

=== Final ===
Rank	Lane	Swimmer	Nation	Time	Notes
1st place, gold medalist(s)	3	Ariarne Titmus	Australia	3:56.69	OC
2nd place, silver medalist(s)	4	Katie Ledecky	United States	3:57.36	
3rd place, bronze medalist(s)	5	Li Bingjie	China	4:01.08	AS
4	2	Summer McIntosh	Canada	4:02.42	NR
5	8	Tang Muhan	China	4:04.10	
6	7	Isabel Gose	Germany	4:04.98	
7	1	Paige Madden	United States	4:06.81	
8	6	Erika Fairweather	New Zealand	4:08.01	
