= 2021 FINA World Swimming Championships (25 m) – Women's 800 metre freestyle =

Swimming competition

Women's 800 metre freestyle at the 2021 FINA World Swimming Championships (25 m)
- Venue: Etihad Arena
- Location: Abu Dhabi, United Arab Emirates
- Dates: 17 December (heats); 18 December (final)
- Competitors: 31 from 23 nations
- Winning time: 8:02.90 CR

Medalists
gold medal	Li Bingjie	China
silver medal	Anastasiya Kirpichnikova
bronze medal	Simona Quadarella	Italy

The Women's 800 metre freestyle competition of the 2021 FINA World Swimming Championships (25 m) was held on 17 and 18 December 2021.

== Records ==
Prior to the competition, the existing world and championship records were as follows.

World record	Mireia Belmonte (ESP)	7:59.34	Berlin, Germany	10 August 2013
Competition record	Mireia Belmonte (ESP)	8:03.41	Doha, Qatar	4 December 2014

The following new records were set during this competition:

Date	Event	Name	Nation	Time	Record
18 December	Final	Li Bingjie	China	8:02.90	CR

== Results ==
=== Heats ===
The heats were started on 17 December at 11:14.

Rank	Heat	Lane	Name	Nationality	Time	Notes
1	3	6	Li Bingjie	China	8:10.08	Q
2	4	8	Summer McIntosh	Canada	8:13.37	Q, WD, NR
3	4	5	Isabel Marie Gose	Germany	8:13.61	Q
4	3	4	Simona Quadarella	Italy	8:14.10	Q
5	4	4	Anastasiya Kirpichnikova	Russian Swimming Federation	8:14.53	Q
6	4	3	Martina Caramignoli	Italy	8:15.01	Q
7	4	6	Katie Grimes	United States	8:16.01	Q, WD
8	3	3	Anna Egorova	Russian Swimming Federation	8:17.03	Q
9	3	0	Emma Weyant	United States	8:20.65	Q
10	3	5	Ajna Késely	Hungary	8:21.81	Q
11	3	7	Viviane Jungblut	Brazil	8:24.78	
12	4	0	Viktória Mihályvári-Farkas	Hungary	8:24.93	
13	3	2	Merve Tuncel	Turkey	8:25.02	
14	4	2	Beril Böcekler	Turkey	8:27.79	
14	2	4	María de Valdés	Spain	8:28.94	
16	2	7	Valentine Dumont	Belgium	8:29.17	
17	4	7	Diana Durães	Portugal	8:32.17	
18	3	9	Jimena Pérez	Spain	8:33.12	
19	4	9	Gabrielle Roncatto	Brazil	8:33.81	
20	3	1	Ryu Ji-won	South Korea	8:33.89	
21	4	1	Han Da-kyung	South Korea	8:34.14	
22	2	3	Lena Opatril	Austria	8:39.56	
23	2	0	Kamonchanok Kwanmuang	Thailand	8:39.81	NR
24	2	5	Delfina Dini	Argentina	8:40.55	
25	2	2	Michaela Pulford	South Africa	8:41.94	
26	2	8	Arianna Valloni	San Marino	8:44.10	NR
27	2	9	Zhanet Angelova	Bulgaria	8:44.88	
28	2	6	Matea Sumajstorčić	Croatia	8:49.05	
29	1	5	Daniela Alfaro	Costa Rica	8:56.29	
30	2	1	Eva Petrovska	North Macedonia	8:59.55	
31	1	4	Michell Ramírez	Honduras	9:13.03	
	1	3	Talita Te Flan	Ivory Coast	DNS	
	1	6	Iman Kouraogo	Burkina Faso	DNS	
	3	8	Hou Yawen	China	DNS	

=== Final ===
The final was held on 18 December at 19:41.

Rank	Lane	Name	Nationality	Time	Notes
1st place, gold medalist(s)	4	Li Bingjie	China	8:02.90	CR
2nd place, silver medalist(s)	6	Anastasiya Kirpichnikova	Russian Swimming Federation	8:06.44	
3rd place, bronze medalist(s)	3	Simona Quadarella	Italy	8:07.99	
4	5	Isabel Marie Gose	Germany	8:08.26	
5	7	Anna Egorova	Russian Swimming Federation	8:14.84	
6	2	Martina Caramignoli	Italy	8:17.60	
7	1	Emma Weyant	United States	8:20.13	
8	8	Ajna Késely	Hungary	8:20.18	
