= Swimming at the 2020 Summer Olympics – Women's 4 × 200 metre freestyle relay =

Women's 4 × 200 metre freestyle relay at the Games of the XXXII Olympiad
- Venue: Tokyo Aquatics Centre
- Dates: 28 July 2021 (heats); 29 July 2021 (final)
- Competitors: 72 from 15 nations
- Teams: 15
- Winning time: 7:40.33 WR

Medalists
1st place, gold medalist(s)		Yang Junxuan, Tang Muhan, Zhang Yufei, Li Bingjie, Dong Jie*, Zhang Yifan*	China
2nd place, silver medalist(s)		Allison Schmitt, Paige Madden, Katie McLaughlin, Katie Ledecky, Brooke Forde*, Bella Sims*	United States
3rd place, bronze medalist(s)		Ariarne Titmus, Emma McKeon, Madison Wilson, Leah Neale, Tamsin Cook*, Meg Harris*, Mollie O'Callaghan*, Brianna Throssell*; *Indicates the swimmer only competed in the preliminary heats.	Australia

The women's 4 × 200 metre freestyle relay event at the 2020 Summer Olympics was held in 2021 at the Tokyo Aquatics Centre. It was the event's seventh consecutive appearance, having been held at every edition since 1996.

Some members of the Chinese relay tested positive for trimetazidine at the Chinese Long Course Invitational held in Shijiazhuang City from 31 December 2020 to 3 January 2021. As of August 2024, the results of competition still stand. For more information, see Trimetazidine revelations in Chinese swimming.

== Summary ==
In one of the most unexpected results at these Games, the Chinese women's team pulled off an enormous upset from the favoured Australian team, taking more than a second off Australia's previous world record. China's Yang Junxuan led off the Chinese quartet in a national record of 1:54.37, holding off Australia's 200 freestyle Olympic champion Ariarne Titmus (1:54.51). Though continuing to trade the lead with Australia in the next two legs, Tang Muhan (1:55.00), Zhang Yufei (1:55.66) and Li Bingjie (1:55.30) ultimately combined to register a gold-medal time of 7:40.33. As the Chinese celebrated their surprise victory, Yufei also added the relay gold to her individual triumph in the 200 butterfly earlier in the session.

The U.S.' Allison Schmitt (1:56.34), Paige Madden (1:55.25) and Katie McLaughlin (1:55.38) moved themselves to third place on the penultimate leg but were still 1.53 seconds behind the second-placed Australian team. However, a sterling anchor split of 1:53.76 from Katie Ledecky ensured the defending Olympic champions a silver medal in an American Record of 7:40.73. Meanwhile, Australia's Titmus, Emma McKeon (1:55.31) and Madison Wilson (1:55.62) finished second in their respective legs but their anchor Leah Neale (1:55.81) could not keep off Ledecky towards a close finish, leaving the Australians with a bronze in an Oceanic Record of 7:41.29.

Canada's Summer McIntosh (1:55.74), Rebecca Smith (1:57.30), Kayla Sanchez (1:55.59) and Penny Oleksiak (1:55:14) slipped off the podium to fourth in a national record of 7:43.77. Meanwhile, ROC (7:52.15), Germany (7:53.89), Hungary (7:56.62) and France (7:58.15) rounded out the championship field.

The medals for competition were presented by Richard W. Pound, IOC member, and the gifts were presented by Antonio Silva, FINA Bureau Member.

== Records ==
Prior to this competition, the existing world and Olympic records were as follows.

World record	Australia (AUS); Ariarne Titmus (1:54.27); Madison Wilson (1:56.73); Brianna Throssell (1:55.60); Emma McKeon (1:54.90)	7:41.50	Gwangju, South Korea	25 July 2019
Olympic record	United States; Missy Franklin (1:55.96); Dana Vollmer (1:56.02); Shannon Vreeland (1:56.85); Allison Schmitt (1:54.09)	7:42.92	London, United Kingdom	1 August 2012

The following record was established during the competition:

Date	Event	Name	Nation	Time	Record
July 29	Final	Yang Junxuan (1:54.37); Tang Muhan (1:55.00); Zhang Yufei (1:55.66); Li Bingjie (1:55.30)	China	7:40.33	WR, OR

== Qualification ==
The top 12 teams in this event at the 2019 World Aquatics Championships qualified for the Olympics. An additional 4 teams qualified through having the fastest times at approved qualifying events during the qualifying period (1 March 2019 to 30 May 2020).

== Competition format ==
The competition consists of two rounds: heats and a final. The relay teams with the best 8 times in the heats advance to the final. Swim-offs are used as necessary to break ties for advancement to the next round.

== Schedule ==
All times are Japan Standard Time (UTC+9)

Date	Time	Round
28 July 2021	20:17	Heats
29 July 2021	12:31	Final

== Results ==
=== Heats ===
A total of sixteen countries qualified to participate. The best eight from two heats advanced to the final.

Rank	Heat	Lane	Nation	Swimmers	Time	Notes
1	2	4	Australia	Mollie O'Callaghan (1:55.11 WJ); Meg Harris (1:57.01); Brianna Throssell (1:56.46); Tamsin Cook (1:56.03)	7:44.61	Q
2	1	4	United States	Bella Sims (1:58.59); Paige Madden (1:55.96); Katie McLaughlin (1:56.02); Brooke Forde (1:57.00)	7:47.57	Q
3	1	5	China	Tang Muhan (1:57.29); Zhang Yifan (1:57.63); Dong Jie (1:57.77); Li Bingjie (1:56.29)	7:48.98	Q
4	2	5	Canada	Katerine Savard (1:58.18); Rebecca Smith (1:55.99); Mary-Sophie Harvey (1:57.53); Sydney Pickrem (1:59.82)	7:51.52	Q
5	2	3	ROC	Anastasia Guzhenkova (1:57.26); Valeriya Salamatina (1:58.87); Veronika Andrusenko (1:57.77); Anna Egorova (1:58.14)	7:52.04	Q
6	1	3	Germany	Isabel Gose (1:57.29); Leonie Kullmann (1:59.00); Marie Pietruschka (1:58.73); Annika Bruhn (1:57.04)	7:52.06	Q
7	1	2	France	Charlotte Bonnet (1:57.61); Assia Touati (1:58.59); Lucile Tessariol (1:59.39); Margaux Fabre (1:59.46)	7:55.05	Q
8	2	6	Hungary	Zsuzsanna Jakabos (1:59.19); Laura Veres (1:57.88); Evelyn Verrasztó (2:00.35); Ajna Késely (1:58.74)	7:56.16	Q
9	1	6	Japan	Chihiro Igarashi (1:57.87); Rio Shirai (1:59.94); Nagisa Ikemoto (2:00.25); Aoi Masuda (2:00.33)	7:58.39	
10	2	7	Brazil	Aline Rodrigues (2:00.15); Larissa Oliveira (2:01.50); Nathalia Almeida (1:59.18); Gabrielle Roncatto (1:58.67)	7:59.50	
11	1	1	South Africa	Aimee Canny (1:58.41); Rebecca Meder (2:00.53); Duné Coetzee (1:59.75); Erin Gallagher (2:02.87)	8:01.56	AF
12	2	1	New Zealand	Erika Fairweather (1:57.38); Carina Doyle (2:02.18); Eve Thomas (2:00.75); Ali Galyer (2:05.85)	8:06.16	
13	1	7	Turkey	Viktoriya Zeynep Güneş (2:04.42); Beril Böcekler (2:02.03); Deniz Ertan (2:04.15); Merve Tuncel (2:00.36)	8:10.96	
14	1	8	South Korea	Jung Hyun-young (2:01.27); Kim Seo-yeong (1:59.98); Han Da-kyung (2:04.38); An Se-hyeon (2:05.53)	8:11.16	
	2	2	Italy	Stefania Pirozzi (2:01.64); Anna Chiara Mascolo; Giulia Vetrano; Federica Pellegrini	DSQ	
	2	8	Hong Kong	Stephanie Au; Camille Cheng; Siobhán Haughey; Ho Nam Wai	DNS	

=== Final ===
Rank	Lane	Nation	Swimmers	Time	Notes
1st place, gold medalist(s)	3	China	Yang Junxuan (1:54.37 NR); Tang Muhan (1:55.00); Zhang Yufei (1:55.66); Li Bingjie (1:55.30)	7:40.33	WR
2nd place, silver medalist(s)	5	United States	Allison Schmitt (1:56.34); Paige Madden (1:55.25); Katie McLaughlin (1:55.38); Katie Ledecky (1:53.76)	7:40.73	AM
3rd place, bronze medalist(s)	4	Australia	Ariarne Titmus (1:54.51); Emma McKeon (1:55.31); Madison Wilson (1:55.62); Leah Neale (1:55.85)	7:41.29	OC
4	6	Canada	Summer McIntosh (1:55.74); Rebecca Smith (1:57.30); Kayla Sanchez (1:55.59); Penny Oleksiak (1:55.14)	7:43.77	NR
5	2	ROC	Anna Egorova (1:58.22); Valeriya Salamatina (1:58.31); Veronika Andrusenko (1:58.17); Anastasia Guzhenkova (1:57.45)	7:52.15	
6	7	Germany	Isabel Gose (1:58.63); Leonie Kullmann (1:59.19); Marie Pietruschka (1:58.36); Annika Bruhn (1:57.71)	7:53.89	
7	8	Hungary	Zsuzsanna Jakabos (1:58.61); Laura Veres (1:59.71); Ajna Késely (1:58.14); Boglárka Kapás (2:00.16)	7:56.62	
8	1	France	Charlotte Bonnet (1:58.08); Assia Touati (1:58.82); Lucile Tessariol (2:00.86); Margaux Fabre (2:00.39)	7:58.15	
