= 2022 FINA World Swimming Championships (25 m) – Women's 800 metre freestyle =

Swimming competition

Women's 800 metre freestyle at the 2022 FINA World Swimming Championships (25 m)
- Venue: Melbourne Sports and Aquatic Centre
- Location: Melbourne, Australia
- Dates: 14 December
- Competitors: 22 from 18 nations
- Winning time: 8:04.07

Medalists
gold medal	Lani Pallister	Australia
silver medal	Erika Fairweather	New Zealand
bronze medal	Miyu Namba	Japan

The Women's 800 metre freestyle competition of the 2022 FINA World Swimming Championships (25 m) was held on 14 December 2022.

== Records ==
Prior to the competition, the existing world and championship records were as follows.

World record	Katie Ledecky (USA)	7:57.42	Indianapolis, United States of America	5 November 2022
Competition record	Li Bingjie (CHN)	8:02.90	Abu Dhabi, United Arab Emirates	18 December 2021

== Results ==
The slowest heats were held at 11:19, and the fastest heat at 19:42.

Rank	Heat	Lane	Name	Nationality	Time	Notes
1st place, gold medalist(s)	3	4	Lani Pallister	Australia	8:04.07	
2nd place, silver medalist(s)	3	7	Erika Fairweather	New Zealand	8:10.41	
3rd place, bronze medalist(s)	3	6	Miyu Namba	Japan	8:12.98	NR
4	3	5	Leah Smith	United States	8:14.24	
5	3	2	Merve Tuncel	Turkey	8:17.89	
6	3	8	Jillian Cox	United States	8:20.95	
7	3	3	Zhang Ke	China	8:24.24	
8	2	3	Gabrielle Roncatto	Brazil	8:25.45	
9	2	4	Yukimi Moriyama	Japan	8:25.46	
10	2	6	Imani de Jong	Netherlands	8:25.84	
11	2	5	Deniz Ertan	Turkey	8:29.92	
12	2	2	Alexa Reyna	France	8:35.32	
13	2	7	Jamie Perkins	Australia	8:36.26	
14	2	1	Paula Otero	Spain	8:37.61	
15	1	5	Stephanie Houtman	South Africa	8:39.15	
16	1	4	Sasha Gatt	Malta	8:40.76	
17	1	3	Klara Bošnjak	Croatia	8:49.67	
18	2	8	Iman Avdić	Bosnia and Herzegovina	8:58.28	
19	1	6	Kuo Jui-an	Chinese Taipei	9:01.45	
20	1	7	Natalia Kuipers	United States Virgin Islands	9:03.17	
21	1	2	Gabriella Doueihy	Lebanon	9:11.60	
	3	1	Gan Ching Hwee	Singapore	DNS	
