= Tang Muhan =

Chinese swimmer (born 2003)

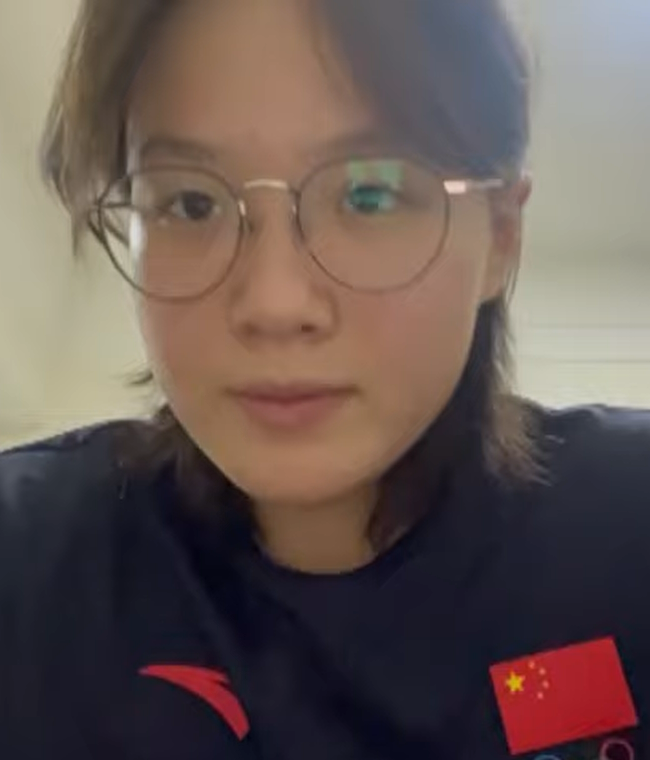
- Tang in 2021

Personal information
- Nationality: Chinese
- Born: 4 September 2003 (age 22) Changchun, Jilin, China

Sport
- Sport: Swimming
Medal record
Women's swimming
Representing China
Olympic Games
| Gold medal – first place | 2020 Tokyo | 4 × 200 m freestyle |
| Bronze medal – third place | 2024 Paris | 4 × 200 m freestyle |
World Championships (LC)
| Bronze medal – third place | 2022 Budapest | 200 m freestyle |

Tang Muhan (Chinese: 汤慕涵, born 4 September 2003) is a Chinese swimmer. She competed in the women's 400 metre freestyle at the 2020 Summer Olympics.

== Early life ==
Born in 2003 in Changchun, Tang started to practice swimming at the age of 7 in 2010. In 2011, she was sent to a swimming club in Jilin for training and in 2012, she was selected by the swimming team of the Bayi Engineering Brigade of the People's Liberation Army and trained with the Bayi Team.

== Swimming career ==
In December 2014, Tang officially joined the Shenzhen sports' swimming team and began her career as a professional athlete.

At the 800 meter freestyle at the 2019 FINA World Junior Swimming Championships, she achieved eighth position. In her other two individual starts and all three women's relays, she was unable to place among the top eight. On 28 July 2021, at women's 4 × 200 m freestyle during the 2020 Summer Olympics in Tokyo, Japan, she along with Yang Junxuan, Zhang Yufei and Li Bingjie won the first gold medal for China in the event, and also attained world-record and Olympic record finish at 7:40.33.
