= Australian Women's Health Sport Awards =

Australian Women's Health Women in Sport Awards were first awarded in 2011. The awards were established by the Australian Women's Health Magazine to recognise the achievements of Australian women in sport. The awards are the main awards for Australian women in sport and cover athletes, performances, teams, leaders and journalists. The awards are also known as "I Support Women in Sport Awards".

== Hall of Fame ==
Year	Name
2015	Susie O'Neill (Swimming)
2016	Layne Beachley (Surfing)
2017	Betty Cuthbert (Athletics)
2018	Evonne Goolagong Cawley (Tennis)
2019	Liz Ellis (Netball)
2022	Lauren Jackson (Basketball)

== Women's Health Athlete ==
Year	Name
2011	Stephanie Gilmore (Surfing)
2012	Anna Meares (Cycling)
2013	Sally Fitzgibbons (Surfing)
2014	Sally Pearson (Athletics)
2015	Anna Meares (Cycling)
2016	Kim Brennan (Rowing)
2017	Samantha Kerr (Football)
2018	Cate Campbell (Swimming)
2019	Ash Barty (Tennis)
2022	Madison de Rozario (Para Athletics)

== Outstanding Woman in Sport ==
Australian Federal Government Award.

Year	Name
2011	Not awarded
2012	Jacqueline Freney (Paralympic swimming)
2013	Kim Crow (Rowing)
2014	Jessica Fox (Canoeing)
2015	Ellyse Perry (Cricket/Football)
2016	Michelle Payne (Horse racing)
2017	Britteny Cox (Mogul skiing)
2018	Skye Nicolson (Boxing)
2019	Hannah Green (Golf)
2022	Ellie Cole (Para Swimming)

== Standout Moment ==
Year	Name
2011	Jessica Watson, Attempt to circumnavigate the world on a sailboat as a 16-year-old
2012	Sally Pearson, 100m hurdles Gold medal at London 2012
2013	Hockeyroos, World League Tournament
2014	Bronte Campbell, Melanie Schlanger, Emma McKeon, Cate Campbell - New World Record, 4x100m Women's freestyle relay at Glasgow 2014
2015	Minjee Lee, Wins her first LPGA tournament
2016	Chloe Esposito - Modern Pentathlon Gold medal at Rio 2016 Michelle Payne - First female jockey of a Melbourne Cup winner (Readers choice)
2017	AFLW inaugural game, Carlton v Collingwood
2018	Ellyse Perry, Double Century in the Inaugural Day-Night Ashes Test
2019	Ash Barty, French Open Women's Singles Title
2022	Ash Barty, Australian Open Women's Singles Title

== Champion Team ==
Year	Name
2011	Victorian Roller Derby
2012	Melbourne Vixens (Netball)
2013	Australian Netball Team (Diamonds)
2014	Australian Netball Team (Diamonds)
2015	Australian Netball Team (Diamonds); Matildas (Football) (Special recognition)
2016	Australian Women's Rugby Sevens (Pearls)
2017	Matildas (Football)
2018	Australian Women’s Cricket Team
2019	Australian Women’s Cricket Team
2022	Australian Women's Cricket Team

== Person of Sporting Influence ==
Year	Name
2016	Moya Dodd (FFA and FIFA Executive)
2017	Dr Susan Alberti (Women's AFL trailblazer)
2018	Raelene Castle (Australian Rugby Union Chief Executive)
2019	Lynne Anderson (CEO Paralympics Australia / Chair Canterbury-Bankstown Bulldogs
2022	Nicole Livingstone (General Manager of AFLW)

== Local Sporting Champion ==
Earlier awards called Local Heroine.

Year	Name
2011	Sarah Mycroft (Running)
2012	Julie Hoffman (Burpee)
2013	Felicity Palmateer (Surfing)
2014	Katie Willimas (Surf Life saving)
2015	Jordan Mercer (Surf Life Saving)
2016	Josie Janz-Dawson (Netball)
2017	Mariella Teuira (Sports Club founder)
2018	Wendy Snowball (Mountain biking)
2019	Lucy Grills (Polocrosse)
2022	Jacqui Dover (Basketball referee)

== Leadership Legend ==
Year	Name
2011	Sally Pearson (Athletics)
2012	Lauren Jackson (Basketball)
2013	Natalie von Bertouch (Netball)
2014	Laura Geitz (Netball)
2015	Laura Geitz (Netball)
2016	Anna Meares (Cycling)
2017	Daisy Pearce (AFLW)
2018	Sam Kerr (Football)
2019	Meg Lanning (Cricket)
2022	Chloe Dalton (AFLW)

== One to Watch ==
Year	Name
2011	Emma Jackson (Triathlon)
2012	Brittany Broben (Diving)
2013	Ashleigh Barty (Tennis)
2014	Emma McKeon (Swimming)
2015	Eleanor Patterson (Athletics)
2016	Ella Nelson (Athletics)
2017	Ashleigh Gardner (Cricket)
2018	Lucy Bartholomew (Ultramarathon running)
2019	Lani Pallister (Swimming)
2022	Mary Fowler (Football)

== Young Achiever ==
Year	Name
2022	Kaylee McKeown (Swimming)

== Irregular or Ceased Awards ==
- Service to Sport: 2011 - Layne Beachley (Surfing); 2013 - Stephanie Gilmore (Surfing); 2014 - Catherine Cox (Netball); 2015 - Lydia Lassila (Aerial skiing)
- Grassroots Greatest: 2011 - Cathy Lambert (Paralympic sport)
- Unsung Hero: 2011 - Julie Coutts
- Comeback of the Year: 2011 - Anna Meares (Cycling); 2018 - Cate Campbell (Swimming); 2019 - Lauren Parker (Para Triathlon)
- Fair Fighter: 2011 - Sam Stosur (Tennis); 2012 - Bridie Kean (Wheelchair Basketball); 2013 - Sally Pearson (Athletics); 2014 - Jordan Mercer (Surf Life Saving); 2015 - Caroline Buchanan (BMX); 2016 - Liesl Tesch (Paralympic Sailing, Wheelchair Basketball) and Ruan Sims (Rugby League, Rugby Union)
- Person of Sporting Words: 2011 - Joanna Griggs (Seven Network); 2012 - Giaan Rooney (Nine Network); 2013 - Liz Ellis (Fox Sports and SBS); 2014 - Mel McLaughlin (Fox Sports and Network 10); 2015 - Amanda Shalala (ABC)
- Contribution to Community: 2015 - Amna Karra-Hassan (AFL)

[1][2][3][4][5][6][7][8][9][10]
