= Zhang Yifan =

Chinese swimmer (born 2000)

Personal information
- Nationality: Chinese
- Born: 22 November 2000 (age 25)

Sport
- Sport: Swimming
Medal record
Women's swimming
Representing China
Olympic Games
Gold medal – first place	2020 Tokyo	4×200 m freestyle
World University Games
Gold medal – first place	2021 Chengdu	4×100 m freestyle
Gold medal – first place	2021 Chengdu	4×200 m freestyle

Zhang Yifan (Chinese: 张一璠; born 22 November 2000) is a Chinese swimmer. She won the gold medal in the women's 4 × 200 metre freestyle relay at the 2020 Summer Olympics as a swimmer in the preliminary series.
