= Ichika Kajimoto =

Japanese swimmer (born 2004)

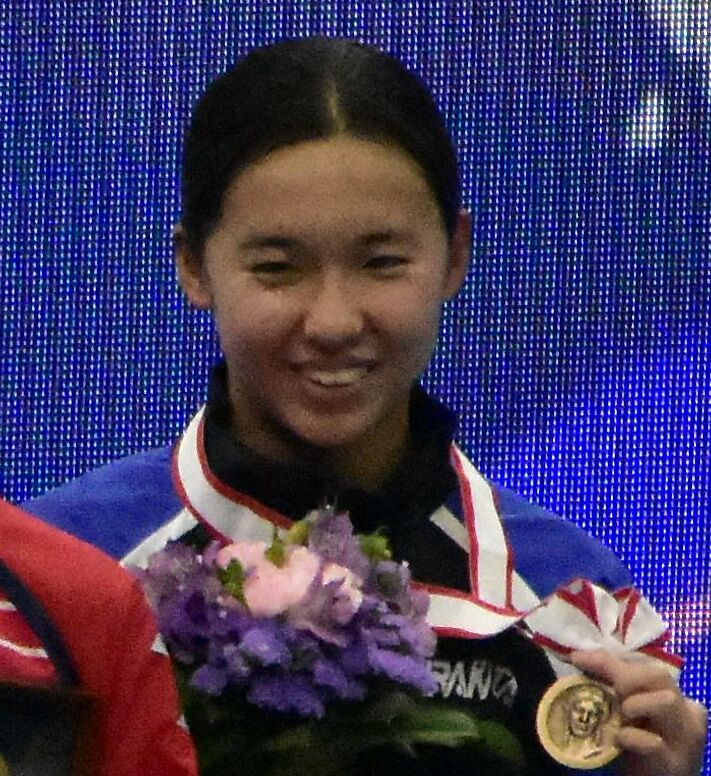
- Kajimoto in 2023

Personal information
- Born: 7 March 2004 (age 22) Osaka, Japan
- Height: 164 cm (5 ft 5 in)

Sport
- Country: Japan
- Sport: Swimming
Medal record
Swimming
Representing Japan
World Championships (LC)
Gold medal – first place	2025 Singapore	3 km knockout sprints
Bronze medal – third place	2025 Singapore	5 km open water
Asian Games
Bronze medal – third place	2026 Aichi–Nagoya	400 m freestyle
Bronze medal – third place	2026 Aichi–Nagoya	800 m freestyle
Bronze medal – third place	2026 Aichi–Nagoya	1500 m freestyle
Pan Pacific Championships
Bronze medal – third place	2026 Long Beach	10 km open water
World University Games
Gold medal – first place	2021 Chengdu	400 m medley
Silver medal – second place	2021 Chengdu	1500 m freestyle
Bronze medal – third place	2021 Chengdu	4×200 m freestyle

Ichika Kajimoto (梶本 一花, Kajimoto Ichika; born 7 March 2004) is a Japanese swimmer. She competed at the 2025 World Aquatics Championships, winning the gold medal in the women's 3 km knockout sprints event.
