= Victoria Shanghai Academy =

International school in Hong Kong

- 滬江維多利亞學校
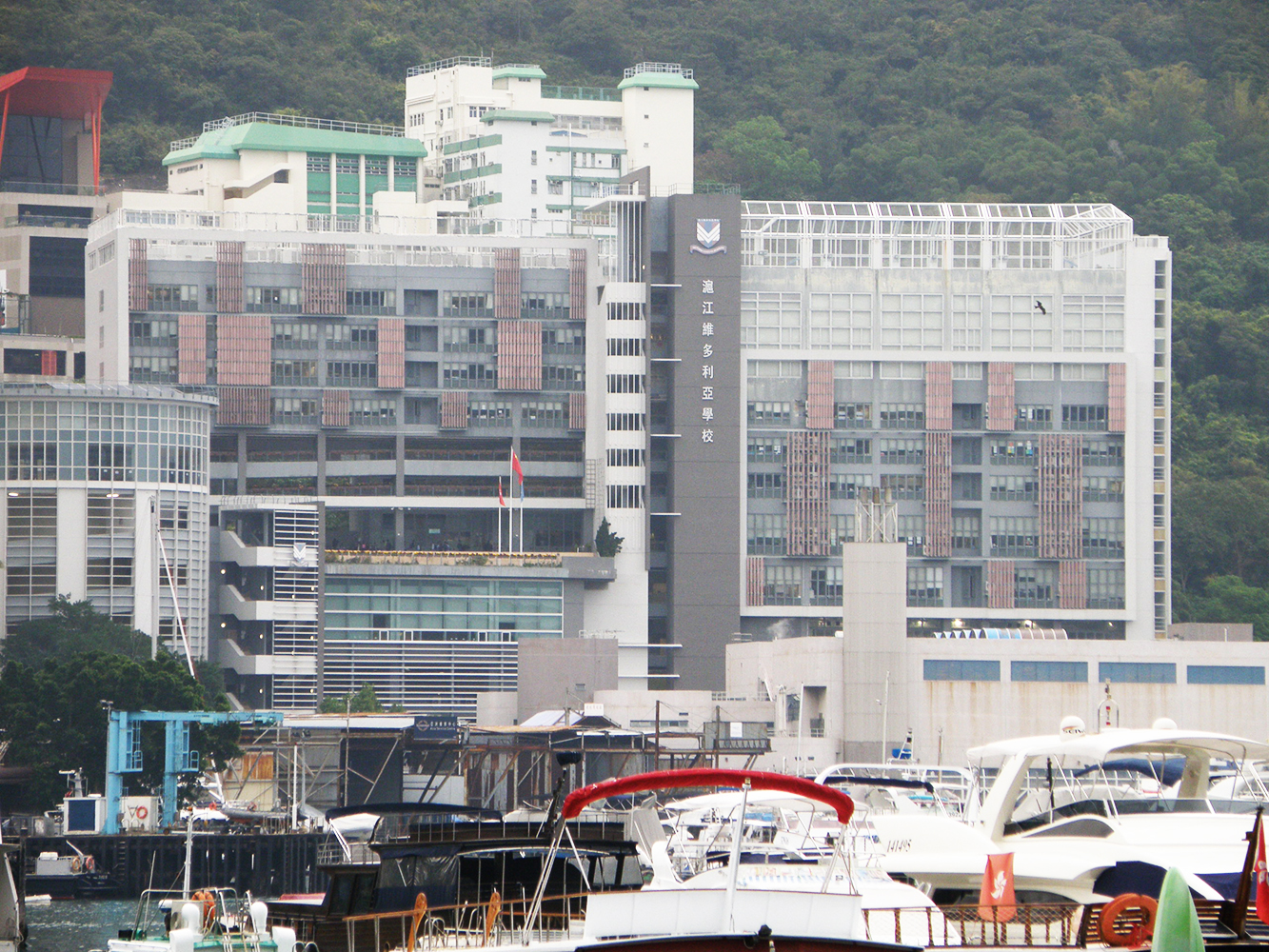
- Campus facade

Location
- 19 Shum Wan Road; Aberdeen; Hong Kong; China; 22°14′30.1″N 114°9′59.4″E

Information
- Other name: VSA
- Former names: C.S. Victoria English Primary School; Victoria English Primary School (Causeway Bay)
- School type: Private bilingual, day, independent, international, non-denominational
- Mottoes: Value, Strive, Act; 明善、奮進、力行
- Established: 1984 (as C.S. Victoria English Primary School); 2004 (as VSA)
- Founders: Victoria Educational Organisation; University of Shanghai Alumni Association
- Status: Open
- Sister school: Victoria Park Academy (Chinese: 深圳丽林维育学校)
- School district: Southern
- Board Chairman: William Doo
- Supervisor: Peggy Lam
- Head of Academy: Dr. Victor Koong
- Secondary Principal: Shirla Sum
- Primary Principal: Ross Dawson
- Teaching staff: 205-210
- Years taught: 1-12
- Gender: Mixed
- Age range: 6-18
- Enrollment: 2,050-2,150 (2024–25)
- Classes: 88
- Average class size: 21-29
- Student to teacher ratio: 1:10
- Education system: International Baccalaureate
- Language: English, Mandarin
- Hours in school day: ~7
- Houses: Amazon; Danube; Nile; Yangtze
- Colors: Blue, red, white
- Song: VSA School Song
- Athletics conference: HKSSF; ISSFHK
- Sports: Association football; athletics; badminton; ball hockey; basketball; bowling; fencing; futsal; golf; netball; sailing; swimming; table tennis; tennis; volleyball
- Mascot: Finn the Shark (current); DANY the Dog (former)
- Nickname: VSA Sharks
- Accreditation: ACAMIS; CIS; EARCOS; IB; NEASC; TASS
- IBDP average: 39.1
- Publication: Yearbook
- Newspaper: The Victorian
- Annual tuition: $169,400-238,860
- Feeder schools: Victoria Kindergartens
- Graduates (2026): 122
- Website: https://vsa.edu.hk

Victoria Shanghai Academy (Chinese: 滬江維多利亞學校, abbreviated as VSA) is a private independent international school in Aberdeen, Hong Kong. VSA is the first through-train International Baccalaureate (IB) school (Note: VSA uses the IB's Primary Years Programme, Middle Years Programme and Diploma Programme.) in Hong Kong and has been described as a leading bilingual IB school in Hong Kong.

== History ==
In 1984, the Victoria Educational Organisation (VEO) established C.S. Victoria English Primary School in School Street, and then Victoria English Primary School (Taikoo Shing) in Taikoo Shing in 1996. In 1999, C.S. Victoria English Primary School moved to Eastern Hospital Road, Causeway Bay and was renamed Victoria English Primary School (Causeway Bay).

In 2001, the Education Bureau granted a construction cost subsidy for a new campus at Shum Wan Road.

In 2003, Victoria English Primary School started implementing the International Baccalaureate (IB) curriculum on a trial basis. The following year, it received preliminary IB certification. Victoria English Primary School officially became an IB World School in 2005. In the same year, the upper primary school of Victoria English Primary School moved to a temporary campus in Wan Chai and opened a secondary school to provide IB secondary school and preparatory courses.

In 2006 and 2007, the secondary school passed the IB certification for the secondary school curriculum and preparatory curriculum respectively, becoming the first IB World School in Hong Kong to offer all 3 courses. In 2007, the primary school buildings were merged and moved to the Sham Wan campus together with the secondary school. An opening ceremony and open day were held at the school building in May 2008.

In 2012, VSA joined the Council of International Schools. In 2022, a HK$420,000,000 campus expansion project that commenced in 2020 was completed, adding 9,000 square metres to the campus. Secretary for Education Christine Choi attended the opening ceremony on 2 December. An affiliated school called Victoria Park Academy (Chinese: 深圳丽林维育学校) was opened in Nanshan, Shenzhen with Maggie Koong as the Head of Academy.

== School administration ==
Heads of Academy

- 2004–07 (as Head of School): Sherrill Shiu (邵麗紅)
- 2007–13: Maggie Koong (孔美琪)
- 2013–15 (acting): Diana Wong (黃葉慧瑩)
- 2015–18: Judith Guy
- 2018–25: Maggie Koong (孔美琪)
- 2025–: Victor Koong (孔慶暘)

Primary Principals

- 2001–07: Ying Cheuk Yung (容英焯)
- 2007–09: Diane Fisk
- 2009–16: Susan Smith (冼蘇珊)
- 2016–: Ross Dawson

Secondary Principals

- 2010–15: Richard Parker (柏奕康)
- 2015–18: Judith Guy
- 2018–22: Christopher Coates
- 2022–: Shirla Sum (岑雅韻)

Notable board members

- Adrian Cheng
- Christina Ting
- Henry Cheng
- Ng Ching-fai

== Accreditation ==
VSA is accredited by the Association of China and Mongolia International Schools, the Council of International Schools, the East Asia Regional Council of Overseas Schools, the International Baccalaureate Organization, the New England Association of Schools and Colleges, and the Alliance for Sustainable Schools.

== Curriculum ==
VSA is an International Baccalaureate (IB) authorized school offering 3 IB courses: Primary Years Programme (PYP) for primary school, Middle Years Programme (MYP) for secondary school, and Diploma Programme (DP) for the last 2 years of secondary school. The school is bilingual, and classes are taught in Mandarin using Traditional characters and English. Students may also choose to study French or Spanish. VSA also offers its own VSA Diploma for students who do not choose to study or do not meet the requirements for the DP.

== Campus ==
The 2022 expansion project added "world-class" facilities to the VSA campus, including:

- an Innovation Hub with virtual reality headsets for robotics, artificial intelligence and STEAM education, computer programming, VEX Robotics, and hackathons
- a performing arts center with a black box theater and a room for drama
- new primary and secondary libraries with study rooms
- a Sports Hall for physical education and extracurricular activities, including a fencing center
- leisure and learning spaces including a student lounge for DP students, "The Quay" and the "Cloud Café"

Sustainable design was adopted in the new campus buildings, including floor-to-ceiling glass, rainwater irrigation and solar photovoltaic systems, and green infrastructure.

== Extracurricular ==
VSA's guiding statement is "Value, Strive, Act" (Chinese: 明善、奮進、力行). At VSA, the Response to Intervention approach is used to support students with special learning needs. VSA offers school bus services.

VSA has four houses, each named after a major river: Amazon, Danube, Nile, and Yangtze. The former school mascot is DANY the dog, an acronym formed by the first letter of the four houses. The current school mascot is Finn the Shark. The school colors are blue, red, and white.

=== Activities ===
VSA publishes a yearbook. The student publication, The Victorian, is known simply as The Vic. Students can learn to perform Chinese martial arts and traditional Chinese dances, including dragon dance, and play Chinese drums. Other school clubs include huaju, an orchestra, and Western dance.

=== Sports ===
The VSA Sharks participate in the Hong Kong Schools Sports Federation and the International Schools Sports Federation Hong Kong. Sports at VSA include association football, athletics, badminton, ball hockey, basketball, bowling, fencing, futsal, golf, netball, sailing, swimming, table tennis, tennis, and volleyball.

== Notable alumni ==
- Kaylin Hsieh, épée fencer
- Johnny Ku, singer and YouTuber
- Katii Tang, swimmer
- YaLocalOffgod (Andrew Mok), fashion designer and entrepreneur

== Victoria Kindergartens ==
Victoria Educational Organisation, one of the founding organizations of VSA, runs several kindergartens in Hong Kong and Mainland China.

Campuses in Hong Kong include:

- Belcher (Pok Fu Lam)
- Harbour Green
- Harbour Heights (North Point)
- Ho Man Tin
- Lower Kornhill
- Middle Kornhill
- Ocean Pride (Tsuen Wan West)
- South Horizons
- Upper Kornhill

Campuses in Mainland China include:

- Hangzhou (2)
- Shanghai (4)
- Shenzhen (4)
- Suzhou (1)

== See also ==
- List of international schools in Hong Kong
