= Lani Pallister =

Australian swimmer (born 2002)

Lani Pallister OAM
Personal information
- National team: Australia
- Born: 6 June 2002 (age 24) Sydney, New South Wales, Australia

Sport
- Sport: Swimming
- Strokes: Freestyle
- Club: St Peters Western
- Coach: Janelle Pallister; Dean Boxall
Medal record
Women's swimming
Representing Australia
Event	1st	2nd	3rd
Olympic Games	1	0	0
World Championships (LC)	2	2	2
World Championships (SC)	5	2	1
Commonwealth Games	4	1	1
Pan Pacific Championships	4	1	0
World Junior Championships	3	3	0
Junior Pan Pac Championships	3	3	0
Total	22	12	4
Olympic Games
Gold medal – first place	2024 Paris	4×200 m freestyle
World Championships (LC)
Gold medal – first place	2023 Fukuoka	4×200 m freestyle
Gold medal – first place	2025 Singapore	4×200 m freestyle
Silver medal – second place	2022 Budapest	4×200 m freestyle
Silver medal – second place	2025 Singapore	800 m freestyle
Bronze medal – third place	2022 Budapest	1500 m freestyle
Bronze medal – third place	2025 Singapore	1500 m freestyle
World Championships (SC)
Gold medal – first place	2022 Melbourne	400 m freestyle
Gold medal – first place	2022 Melbourne	800 m freestyle
Gold medal – first place	2022 Melbourne	1500 m freestyle
Gold medal – first place	2022 Melbourne	4×200 m freestyle
Gold medal – first place	2024 Budapest	800 m freestyle
Silver medal – second place	2024 Budapest	400 m freestyle
Silver medal – second place	2024 Budapest	4×100 m freestyle
Bronze medal – third place	2024 Budapest	4×200 m freestyle
Commonwealth Games
Gold medal – first place	2026 Glasgow	400 m freestyle
Gold medal – first place	2026 Glasgow	800 m freestyle
Gold medal – first place	2026 Glasgow	1500 m freestyle
Gold medal – first place	2026 Glasgow	4×200 m freestyle
Silver medal – second place	2026 Glasgow	200 m freestyle
Bronze medal – third place	2022 Birmingham	800 m freestyle
Pan Pacific Championships
Gold medal – first place	2026 Irvine	200 m freestyle
Gold medal – first place	2026 Irvine	400 m freestyle
Gold medal – first place	2026 Irvine	800 m freestyle
Gold medal – first place	2026 Irvine	4×200 m freestyle
Silver medal – second place	2026 Irvine	1500 m freestyle
World Junior Championships
Gold medal – first place	2019 Budapest	400 m freestyle
Gold medal – first place	2019 Budapest	800 m freestyle
Gold medal – first place	2019 Budapest	1500 m freestyle
Silver medal – second place	2019 Budapest	200 m freestyle
Silver medal – second place	2019 Budapest	4×100 m freestyle
Silver medal – second place	2019 Budapest	4×200 m freestyle
Junior Pan Pac Championships
Gold medal – first place	2018 Suva	400 m freestyle
Gold medal – first place	2018 Suva	800 m freestyle
Gold medal – first place	2018 Suva	1500 m freestyle
Silver medal – second place	2018 Suva	200 m freestyle
Silver medal – second place	2018 Suva	4×100 m freestyle
Silver medal – second place	2018 Suva	4×200 m freestyle

Lani Pallister (born 6 June 2002) is an Australian competitive swimmer. She is a world record holder in two sports, with a world record in swimming, the short course 4×200-metre freestyle relay, and world records in life saving for the youth age group in the 100-metre rescue medley and 200-metre super lifesaver. She holds the Oceanian, Commonwealth, and Australian records in the short course 1500-metre freestyle and the Australian record in the short course 800-metre freestyle. She is the first female World Short Course champion in the 1500-metre freestyle, winning the inaugural event for women at the 2022 edition. Over the course of the 2022 World Short Course Championships, she won the gold medal in each of the four events she contested (three individual events and one relay).

At the 2022 World Aquatics Championships, she became the first Australian woman to win a medal in the 1500-metre freestyle at a World Aquatics Championships, winning the bronze medal. She is a seven-time, 2018, 2019, 2020, 2023, 2024, 2025, 2026 Pier to Pub open water swim winner.

== Background ==
Pallister was born on 6 June 2002 in Sydney to mother Janelle Pallister, a swimmer at the 1988 Summer Olympics and gold medalist at the 1990 Commonwealth Games. She has been coached by her mother since a young age and in 2020 changed swimming clubs to Griffith University where she is coached by both Janelle Pallister and Michael Bohl. Her godmother is Olympian Dawn Fraser.

== Career ==
=== 2017–2018 ===
==== 2017 World Junior Championships ====
In August, 15-year-old Pallister competed at the 2017 FINA World Junior Swimming Championships, held in Indianapolis, United States, placing eighth in the 1500-metre freestyle with a 16:32.59 and tenth in the 800-metre freestyle with a 8:39.86. She followed up with a first open water title in the annual Pier to Pub swim in January 2018 at 15 years of age.

==== 2018 National Pool Life Saving Championships ====
When Pallister was 16 years old, she set a new world life saving record in the 100-metre rescue medley of 1:12.14 at the 2018 National Pool Championships in Adelaide in August, lowering the previous record by over three tenths of a second.

==== 2018 Junior Pan Pacific Championships ====
At the 2018 Junior Pan Pacific Swimming Championships in Suva, Fiji in August, Pallister won gold medals in the 1500-metre freestyle, 800-metre freestyle, 400-metre freestyle, as well as silver medals in the 4×200-metre freestyle relay and the 200-metre freestyle. Her time of 16:08.09 in the 1500-metre freestyle set a new Championships record in the event. She also won a silver medal in the 4×100-metre freestyle relay, which made her total medal count for the Championships six medals.

==== 2018 World Lifesaving Championships ====
Returning to Adelaide following her success at the Junior Pan Pacific Championships, Pallister competed at the 2018 World Lifesaving Championships in November, helping team Australia win the world crown at the Championships. In the 200-metre super lifesaver event she set a new youth world life saving record in the event at 2:24.19. She also set a new world life saving record in the 100-metre rescue medley at 1:10.21, which was almost two seconds faster than the previous record she set in August.

=== 2019–2020 ===
In January 2019, Pallister won her second-consecutive title in the Pier to Pub open water swim in Lorne, winning the women's event, a 1.2-kilometre race, in a time of 12:20. Two months later, in March at the year's Surf Life Saving Australia Championships in Burleigh Heads, 16-year-old Pallister narrowly won the national title in the 2-kilometre ocean swim ahead of second-place finisher Kareena Lee.

==== 2019 World Junior Championships ====
2019 World Junior Championships
Gold medal – first place	800 m freestyle	8:22.49 (CR)
Gold medal – first place	400 m freestyle	4:05.42 (CR)
Gold medal – first place	1500 m freestyle	15:58.86 (CR)
Silver medal – second place	4×200 m freestyle relay	7:57.87
Silver medal – second place	4×100 m freestyle relay	3:40.85
Silver medal – second place	200 m freestyle	1:58.09

As a 17-year-old at the 2019 FINA World Junior Swimming Championships in Budapest, Hungary in August, Pallister won her first medal, a silver medal, in the 4×200-metre freestyle relay where she split a 1:58.61 for the lead-off leg of the relay, helping achieve a final time of 7:57.87. She won her first gold medal in the 800-metre freestyle, where she finished first with a Championships record time of 8:22.49. Pallister delivered her second gold medal in Championships record time in the 400-metre freestyle with a time of 4:05.42. On 24 August, Pallister won the 1500-metre freestyle with a time of 15:58.86, which marked her third gold medal at the Championships, set a new Championships record in the event, and was over 15 seconds faster than the next fastest swimmer in the event. Later in the same finals session, she won her second silver medal of the Championships, this time in the 4×100-metre freestyle relay where she swam a 55.23 for the third leg of the relay, contributing to the final time of 3:40.85. Pallister finished competing on 25 August, the final day of competition, winning a silver medal in the 200-metre freestyle with a time of 1:58.09 and making her efforts six-for-six in terms of medaling in every event she raced, winning a total of three gold medals and three silver medals.

After the end of competition, Pallister was named as one of two swimmers of the Championships, receiving the "Female Swimmer of the Championships" honour from FINA while Andrey Minakov of Russia was named as "Male Swimmer of the Championships". She was publicly announced as a nominee for the "One to Watch" award, one of the Australian Women's Health Sport Awards, in October 2019. The following month, Pallister was announced as the recipient of the "One to Watch" award.

==== 2020 Queensland Championships ====
Pallister started off 2020 with a third-consecutive open water title in the Pier to Pub swim in January. In September, at the Queensland Short Course Championships, she set a new Australian record and a new Australian All Comers record in the 800-metre freestyle with a time of 8:11.71, which made her the first Australian woman to swim the race in less than 8 minutes and 12 seconds.

==== 2020 Australian Short Course Championships ====
Due to the COVID-19 pandemic the 2020 Australian Short Course Championships were held virtually in November, Pallister took full advantage of the Championships still being held and set a new Australian record and a new Australian All Comers record in the 800-metre freestyle with her time of 8:10.12. She also set new Australian and Australian All Comers records in the 1500-metre freestyle with a time of 15:28.33 that made her the fourth fastest female swimmer in the race in history only behind Sarah Köhler of Germany, Mireia Belmonte of Spain, and Lauren Boyle of New Zealand.

=== 2022 ===
Leading up to the 2022 Commonwealth Games, Pallister and her mother both served as baton bearers as part of the 2022 Commonwealth Games Queen's Baton Relay in March. As of 30 March 2022, Pallister ranked second globally for the 2022 year in the long course 1500-metre freestyle, only behind Katie Ledecky of the United States.

==== 2022 Australian Swimming Championships ====
At the 2022 Australian Swimming Championships in May, and conducted in long course metres, Pallister won the gold medal in the 800-metre freestyle with a personal best time of 8:17.77 and qualified for the 2022 World Aquatics Championships and 2022 Commonwealth Games. Her time made her the second-fastest female Australian ever in the long course 800-metre freestyle after Ariarne Titmus. On the third day, she swam a personal best time of 1:57.23 in the prelims heats of the 200-metre freestyle, qualifying for the final ranking fifth. In the final, she lowered her personal best time to a 1:56.28 and placed sixth. She achieved another World Championships and Commonwealth Games qualifying time in the 1500-metre freestyle on the fourth day, winning the gold medal with a personal best time of 15:55.40. The fifth and final day of competition, she ranked second in the prelims heats of the 400-metre freestyle with a time of 4:08.87 and qualified for the final. She placed second in the final with a personal best time of 4:02.21.

==== 2022 World Aquatics Championships ====
2022 World Championships (LC)
Silver medal – second place	4×200 m freestyle	7:43.86 (h)
Bronze medal – third place	1500 m freestyle	15:48.96

On the first day of pool swimming competition at the 2022 World Aquatics Championships, Pallister qualified for the final of the 400-metre freestyle ranking third with a time of 4:03.71 in the preliminaries heats. In the evening final, she swam a personal best time of 4:02.16 and placed fourth. The following day, she ranked fourth in the preliminary stage of competition in the 1500-metre freestyle, qualifying for the final with a time of 15:57.61. She won the bronze medal in the final the following day, finishing in a personal best time of 15:48.96, which was less than five seconds behind silver medalist Katie Grimes of the United States. It marked the first time an Australian woman won a medal in the 1500-metre freestyle at a FINA World Aquatics Championships.

On day five, Pallister split a 1:56.86 for the second leg of the 4×200-metre freestyle relay in the preliminaries, helping qualify the relay for the final ranking first in 7:47.61. In the final, Leah Neale swam the second leg of the relay in her place and she won a silver medal for her efforts in the preliminaries when the finals relay finished second in 7:43.86. The next day, she qualified for the final of the 800 metre freestyle ranking second in the prelims, behind first-ranked Katie Ledecky of the United States and ahead of third-ranked Leah Smith of the United States, with a time of 8:24.66. She withdrew from competition following her finals qualification, not competing in the final of the event.

==== 2022 Commonwealth Games ====
On day four of swimming competition at the 2022 Commonwealth Games, Pallister ranked first in the preliminaries of the 800-metre freestyle with a time of 8:32.67. In the final the following day, she lowered her time to a 8:19.16 and won the bronze medal behind two other Australian swimmers. In her final event of the Games, the 400-metre freestyle on the sixth and final day of swimming competition, she ranked fourth in the preliminaries, behind first-ranked Erika Fairweather of New Zealand, second-ranked Summer McIntosh of Canada, and third-ranked Ariarne Titmus of Pallister's country, and qualified for the final. In the final, she placed fifth with a time of 4:04.43, finishing 0.59 seconds behind fourth-place finisher Erika Fairweather and 5.30 seconds ahead of six-place finisher Eve Thomas, both of New Zealand. Following her performances, on 10 August, she was named to the Team Australia roster for the 2022 Duel in the Pool.

==== 2022 Australian Short Course Championships ====
In August, at the 2022 Australian Short Course Swimming Championships, Pallister won the bronze medal in the 200-metre freestyle with a personal best time of 1:53.81 on day one before setting new Australian and Australia All Comers records in the 1500-meter freestyle with a time of 15:24.63 later in the day. Two days later, she won the 400-metre freestyle in a personal best time of 3:56.74. The fourth and final day, she won the 800-meter freestyle in a new Australian and Australian All Comers record time of 8:07.37.

==== 2022 World Short Course Championships ====
2022 World Championships (SC)
Gold medal – first place	400 m freestyle	3:55.04
Gold medal – first place	800 m freestyle	8:04.07 (NR)
Gold medal – first place	4×200 m freestyle	7:30.87 (WR)
Gold medal – first place	1500 m freestyle	15:21.43 (CR, OC)

Pallister earned a spot on the Team Australia roster for the 2022 World Short Course Championships in December based on her results at the 2022 Australian Short Course Championships and was publicly named to the roster on 2 September. The first morning, she advanced to the final of the 400-metre freestyle ranking second per her time of 3:59.50 in the preliminaries. For the final, she achieved a time drop of 1.70 seconds from her previous best time in the event, formerly 3:56.74, to win the gold medal with a new personal best time of 3:55.04. Her medal was the first gold medal won by a female Australian swimmer at the home-country 2022 World Short Course Championships.

The evening of day two, Pallister registered another personal best time, this time winning the gold medal in the 800-metre freestyle with an Australian and All Comers record time of 8:04.07, which was a 3.30 second improvement on her previous personal best and the corresponding national marks. She followed up with her first world record in swimming, helping win the gold medal in the 4×200-metre freestyle relay with the quickest split time of her finals relay teammates, a 1:52.24, that contributed to the new world record and Championships record mark of 7:30.87 and made her a simultaneous world record holder in two sports, one world record in swimming and two world records in life saving. For her final event of the Championships, the 1500-metre freestyle on day four, she won the first-ever World Short Course Championships title and gold medal in the event for a female swimmer, achieving her victory with a Championships, Oceanian, Commonwealth, Australian, and Australian All Comers record time of 15:21.43, which was a 3.20 second time drop from her previous best mark of 15:24.63. At the awards ceremony, she received her medal from her godmother Dawn Fraser.

=== 2023 ===
At the 2023 Pier to Pub open water swim in January, Pallister won the Super Fish category, placed second overall amongst female competitors, and twenty-eighth overall among all competitors with a time of 12:36. In April, at the 2023 Australian Swimming Championships in Gold Coast, Queensland, she won the silver medal in the 800-metre freestyle with a time of 8:24.72. She also won the silver medal in the 400-metre freestyle on day three with a 4:05.86. On day four of four, she placed seventh in the 200-metre freestyle with a 1:58.13. Two months later, she placed second in the 400-metre freestyle at the 2023 Australian Swimming Trials with a 2023 World Aquatics Championships qualifying time of 4:02.43 and third in the 200-metre freestyle with a personal best time of 1:56.03.

=== 2024 season ===
==== 2024 Olympics ====
During the 2024 Summer Olympics, Pallister withdrew from the women’s 1500m freestyle after testing positive for COVID-19. She overcame an early illness to win a gold medal as part of Australia's dominant women's 4 × 200 metre freestyle relay team.

==== 2024 Short Course Championships ====
Later that year at the 2024 World Short Course Championships in Budapest, Pallister successfully competed in the 800-metre freestyle, touching first in a championship-record time of 8:01.95.

=== 2025 Season ===
==== World Aquatics Championships (Singapore) ====
At the 2025 World Aquatics Championships held in Singapore during July and August, Pallister had a career-defining long-course championship campaign. In the 800-metre freestyle final, she surged from third place with a field-best final 50-metre split of 29.11 to capture the silver medal in 8:05.98. The performance broke the Australian and Oceanian records, made her the third-fastest performer in history behind Katie Ledecky and Summer McIntosh, and came within three-tenths of a second of Ledecky's winning time. She also claimed a bronze medal in the 1500-metre freestyle, finished fourth in the 400-metre freestyle, and won a gold medal as part of Australia's 4 × 200-metre freestyle relay team.

==== Swimming World Cup circuit ====
Pallister carried her form into the autumn short-course season during the North American leg of the 2025 World Aquatics Swimming World Cup:

- Westmont, Illinois: On 17 October, she won the 400-metre freestyle in 3:52.42, establishing a new World Cup record and ranking as the third-fastest performer of all time. She completed a distance sweep by also winning the 1500-metre freestyle in an Oceanian record time of 15:13.83.
- Toronto, Ontario: At the final stop from 23 to 25 October, Pallister lowered her 400-metre freestyle mark to 3:51.87 to take gold and secure a "Triple Crown" series sweep in the event, becoming just the third woman to break the 3:52 barrier. On the final evening, she broke Katie Ledecky's three-year-old short-course world record in the 800-metre freestyle, clocking 7:54.00 to take more than three seconds off the previous global mark.

=== 2026 Season ===
In 2026, Pallister competed at the Commonwealth Games in Glasgow, claiming multiple gold medals, including the 1500-metre freestyle.

Momentum reached its peak at the 2026 Pan Pacific Swimming Championships in Irvine, California. Most notably, Pallister delivered a historic upset in the 800-metre freestyle, leading from start to finish and clocking 8:06.10 to defeat American legend Katie Ledecky. The victory marked Ledecky's first-ever defeat in an 800-metre freestyle final at a major international championship, ending a 14-year undefeated streak. Prior to that, she became the #1 in the world rankings in the women's 400m freestyle, with the time of 3:58.42.

== International championships (50 m) ==
Meet	200 freestyle	400 freestyle	800 freestyle	1500 freestyle	4×100 freestyle	4×200 freestyle
Junior level
WJC 2017 (age: 15)			10th (8:39.86)	8th (16:32.59)		
PACJ 2018 (age: 16)	(silver) (1:59.00)	(gold) (4:07.76)	(gold) (8:29.65)	(gold) (16:08.09 CR)	(silver) (3:41.51; split 55.08, 4th leg)	(silver) (7:59.97; split 1:58.83, 1st leg)
WJC 2019 (age: 17)	(silver) (1:58.09)	(gold) (4:05.42 CR)	(gold) (8:22.49 CR)	(gold) (15:58.86 CR)	(silver) (3:40.85; split 55.23, 3rd leg)	(silver) (7:57.87; split 1:58.61, 1st leg)
Senior level
WC 2022 (age: 20)		4th (4:02.16)	2nd (h, WD) (8:24.66)	(bronze) (15:48.96)		(silver) ^{[a]} (split 1:56.86, 2nd leg)
CG 2022 (age: 20)		5th (4:04.43)	(bronze) (8:19.16)	—N/a		

^{a} Pallister swam only in the preliminary heats.

== International championships (25 m) ==
Meet	200 freestyle	400 freestyle	800 freestyle	1500 freestyle	4×100 freestyle	4×200 freestyle
WC 2022 (age: 20)		(gold) (3:55.04)	(gold) (8:04.07 NR)	(gold) (15:21.43 CR, OC)		(gold) (7:30.87 WR; split 1:52.24, 4th leg)
WC 2024 (age: 22)	4th (1:51.75)	(silver) (3:53.73 OC)	(gold) (8:01.95 CR, NR)		(silver) (3:28.25; split 52.36, 4th leg)	(bronze) (7:33.60; split 1:51.84, 4th leg)

== Personal best times ==
=== Long course metres (50 m pool) ===
Event	Time		Meet	Location	Date	Notes	Ref
100 m freestyle	54.64		2024 Australian Championships	Gold Coast	17 April 2024		
200 m freestyle	1:54.77	r	2025 World Aquatics Championships	Singapore	31 July 2025		
400 m freestyle	3:58.87		2025 World Aquatics Championships	Singapore	27 July 2025		
800 m freestyle	8:05.98		2025 World Aquatics Championships	Singapore	2 August 2025	OC, NR	
1500 m freestyle	15:39.14		2025 Australian Swimming Trials	Adelaide	14 June 2025	OC, NR, ACR	

=== Short course metres (25 m pool) ===
Event	Time	Meet	Location	Date	Notes	Ref
50 m freestyle	25.68	2020 Queensland Championships	Brisbane	25 September 2020		
100 m freestyle	55.36	2018 Australian Short Course Championships	Melbourne	25 October 2018		
200 m freestyle	1:53.81	2022 Australian Short Course Swimming Championships	Sydney	24 August 2022		
400 m freestyle	3:55.04	2022 World Short Course Championships	Melbourne	13 December 2022		
800 m freestyle	8:04.07	2022 World Short Course Championships	Melbourne	14 December 2022	NR, ACR	
1500 m freestyle	15:21.43	2022 World Short Course Championships	Melbourne	16 December 2022	OC, CR, NR, ACR	

Legend: OC – Oceanian record; CR – Commonwealth record; NR – Australian record; e – equalled existing record; ACR – Australian All Comers record;
Records not set in finals: h – heat; sf – semifinal; r – relay 1st leg; rh – relay heat 1st leg; b – B final; † – en route to final mark; so – swim-off; tt – time trial

== World records ==
=== Short course metres (25 m pool) ===
No.	Event	Time	Meet	Location	Date	Age	Status	Ref
1	4×200 m freestyle relay	7:30.87	2022 World Short Course Championships	Melbourne	14 December 2022	20	Former	
2	800 m freestyle	7:54.00	2025 Swimming World Cup	Toronto, Canada	25 October 2025	23	Current	

=== World life saving records ===
No.	Event	Time	Meet	Location	Date	Age	Age Group	Ref
1	100 m rescue medley	1:12.14	2018 National Pool Life Saving Championships	Adelaide	5 August 2018	16	Youth	
2	200 m super lifesaver	2:24.19	2018 World Lifesaving Championships	Adelaide	27 November 2018	16	Youth	
3	100 m rescue medley (2)	1:10.21	2018 World Lifesaving Championships	Adelaide	28 November 2018	16	Youth	
4	200 m super lifesaver (2)	2:22.32	27th International German Cup	Warendorf, Germany	23 November 2019	17	Youth	

== Olympic records ==
=== Long course metres ===
No.	Event	Time	Meet	Location	Date	Status	Notes	Ref
1	4x200 m freestyle relay^{[a]}	7:38.08	2024 Summer Olympics	Paris, France	1 August 2024	Current		

Legend: WR – World record; OC – Oceanian record; NR – Australian record; e – equalled existing record;
Records not set in finals: h – heat; sf – semifinal; r – relay 1st leg; rh – relay heat 1st leg; b – B final; † – en route to final mark; so – swim-off; tt – time trial

^{a} split 1:55.61 (2nd leg) with Mollie O'Callaghan (1st leg), Brianna Throssell (3rd leg), Ariarne Titmus (4th leg)

== Continental and national records ==
=== Short course metres (25 m pool) ===
No.	Event	Time	Meet	Location	Date	Age	Type	Status	Notes	Ref
1	800 m freestyle	8:11.71	2020 Queensland Championships	Brisbane	25 September 2020	18	NR, ACR	Former		
2	800 m freestyle (2)	8:10.12	2020 Australian Short Course Championships	Brisbane	26 November 2020	18	NR, ACR	Former		
3	1500 m freestyle	15:28.33	2020 Australian Short Course Championships	Brisbane	26 November 2020	18	NR, ACR	Former		
4	1500 m freestyle (2)	15:24.63	2022 Australian Short Course Championships	Sydney	24 August 2022	20	NR, ACR	Former		
5	800 m freestyle (3)	8:07.37	2022 Australian Short Course Championships	Sydney	27 August 2022	20	NR, ACR	Former		
6	800 m freestyle (4)	8:04.07	2022 World Short Course Championships	Melbourne	14 December 2022	20	NR, ACR	Current		
7	4×200 m freestyle	7:30.87	2022 World Short Course Championships	Melbourne	14 December 2022	20	OC, NR, ACR	Current	WR, CR	
8	1500 m freestyle (3)	15:21.43	2022 World Short Course Championships	Melbourne	16 December 2022	20	OC, NR, ACR	Current	CR	

Legend: WR – World record; OC – Oceanian record; CR – Commonwealth record; NR – Australian record; e – equalled existing record; ACR – Australian All Comers record;
Records not set in finals: h – heat; sf – semifinal; r – relay 1st leg; rh – relay heat 1st leg; b – B final; † – en route to final mark; so – swim-off; tt – time trial

== Awards and honours ==
- Australian Women's Health Sport Awards, One to Watch: 2019
- FINA, Female Swimmer of the Championships: 2019 World Junior Championships
- Swimming Australia, Patron's Award: 2019
- SwimSwam Top 100 (Women's): 2021 (#63)
- Medal of the Order of Australia in the 2025 Australia Day Honours

== See also ==
- List of world records in life saving
- List of Australian records in swimming
