= YaLocalOffgod =

Hong Kong fashion designer (born 2005)

- Born: Andrew Mok; January 21, 2005 (age 20); Hong Kong, China
- Education: Victoria Shanghai Academy
- Occupations: Fashion designer; model; entrepreneur
- Website: offgodofficial.com

Andrew Mok (莫家俊; born January 22, 2005), known professionally as YaLocalOffgod, is a Hong Kong fashion artist, designer and entrepreneur. He is one half of the multidisciplinary creative duo OffgodTate, and is also the founder of his clothing brand Drewbone. He previously served as a graphic designer for Lil Bibby’s label, Grade A Productions. Offgod is a portmanteau of the word 'Off' from Off White and the word God.

== Fashion and modelling background ==
The name of the brand 'bandage boy' was inspired by the bandages Offgod adds to his art, as well as Tyler, The Creator's Grammy-nominated album 'Flower Boy'. The idea of the brand can be traced back to an Instagram post by Offgod on January 25, 2022, where he uploaded a picture of the brand's first design – a sewn jacket. Development over the rest of the year was not entirely publicised, but online tabloids like Lifestyle Asia Hong Kong covered the concept of the brand, from Offgod's perspective. He mentions that the idea came to fruition after he "pitched it to his management at his record label, and they loved it!" In late 2022, cameos on his Instagram page included TikTok star Addison Rae, wearing Apple AirPod Max attachments for the headphones made from a 3D printer. These attachments included a host of designs, ranging from human-resembling figurines, to abstract artpieces. Following the theme of the aforementioned attachments, Offgod utilised scrapped parts to assemble accessories for a one-of-one suitcase, as well as one-of-one attachments for shoes. 2023 was the breakout year for the designer, accelerating production of items for his brand through various designs such as Apple Watch attachments, sunglasses attachments and further developments on the Airpod Max attachments. In the midst of all these creations, Offgod was featured as a model in Adidas Hong Kong's 'Stan Smith' collection. His brand's first official release came on 28 July 2023, where an assortment of tote bags, cargo pants, sweaters and shirts were announced. The site sold out within two weeks, after popular demand for the items. Work away from his brand includes articles with Vogue Hong Kong, Hypebeast, and Tatler Asia.

== Artistic background ==
Offgod was first known for his artistic skill. He began posting on his Instagram page on June 4, 2018, and mainly revolved around late rapper Juice WRLD, and would later sign for the same record label the artist was in. He was first recognised by Japanese artist Takashi Murakami and then later American singer and fellow fashion designer Pharrell Williams. With this new-found exposure, Offgod found himself being contacted by Chicago rapper Lil Bibby, and consequently signed for his label, Grade A Productions. Making covers for songs such as Reminds Me of You for Australian rapper The Kid Laroi and Juice WRLD as well as TikTok star-turned singer Bella Poarch's Build a Bitch, Offgod only grew in popularity, exponentially. His trademark animated-style as well as drawings from the perspective from a fisheye lens got him his first exhibition in Hysan Place, Hong Kong where he showcased his art for the public to see.

== See also ==
- Nigo, Japanese fashion designer
- Pharrell Williams, American artist and fashion designer
- Takashi Murakami, Japanese artist
