= 2022 FINA World Swimming Championships (25 m) – Women's 400 metre individual medley =

Swimming competition

Women's 400 metre individual medley at the 2022 FINA World Swimming Championships (25 m)
- Venue: Melbourne Sports and Aquatic Centre
- Location: Melbourne, Australia
- Dates: 17 December (heats and final)
- Competitors: 22 from 18 nations
- Winning time: 4:26.51

Medalists
gold medal	Hali Flickinger	United States
silver medal	Sara Franceschi	Italy
bronze medal	Waka Kobori	Japan

The Women's 400 metre individual medley competition of the 2022 FINA World Swimming Championships (25 m) was held on 17 December 2022.

== Records ==
Prior to the competition, the existing world and championship records were as follows.

World record	Mireia Belmonte (ESP)	4:18.94	Eindhoven, Netherlands	12 August 2017
Competition record	Mireia Belmonte (ESP)	4:19.86	Doha, Qatar	3 December 2014

== Results ==
=== Heats ===
The heats were started at 11:47.

Rank	Heat	Lane	Name	Nationality	Time	Notes
1	4	7	Leah Smith	United States	4:30.93	Q
2	4	6	Sara Franceschi	Italy	4:31.01	Q
3	3	7	Waka Kobori	Japan	4:31.19	Q
4	3	3	Zsuzsanna Jakabos	Hungary	4:31.36	Q
5	4	3	Hali Flickinger	United States	4:31.61	Q
6	3	5	Ilaria Cusinato	Italy	4:32.94	Q
7	4	4	Tessa Cieplucha	Canada	4:33.58	Q
8	4	1	Cyrielle Duhamel	France	4:34.03	Q
9	4	5	Abbie Wood	Great Britain	4:34.45	
10	3	2	Kayla Hardy	Australia	4:34.77	
11	3	1	Emilie Muir	Australia	4:35.52	
12	2	2	Mya Rasmussen	New Zealand	4:36.08	
13	2	3	Deniz Ertan	Turkey	4:38.11	
14	2	4	Dakota Tucker	South Africa	4:40.01	
15	3	8	Nikoleta Trníková	Slovakia	4:40.09	
16	4	2	Ayami Suzuzki	Japan	4:40.95	
17	2	7	Iman Avdić	Bosnia and Herzegovina	4:42.56	NR
18	2	6	Portia Brown	Puerto Rico	4:44.68	
19	1	3	Chen Szu-an	Chinese Taipei	4:44.97	
20	1	4	Ng Lai Wa	Hong Kong	4:45.62	
21	3	6	Ge Chutong	China	4:46.59	
22	1	5	Lucero Mejía	Guatemala	4:49.99	NR
	2	5	Anja Crevar	Serbia	Did not start	
	3	4	Sydney Pickrem	Canada	Did not start	
	4	8	Gabrielle Roncatto	Brazil	Did not start	

=== Final ===
The final was held at 20:40.

Rank	Lane	Name	Nationality	Time	Notes
1st place, gold medalist(s)	2	Hali Flickinger	United States	4:26.51	
2nd place, silver medalist(s)	5	Sara Franceschi	Italy	4:28.58	
3rd place, bronze medalist(s)	3	Waka Kobori	Japan	4:29.03	
4	4	Leah Smith	United States	4:29.18	
5	6	Zsuzsanna Jakabos	Hungary	4:32.10	
6	8	Cyrielle Duhamel	France	4:32.40	
7	7	Ilaria Cusinato	Italy	4:32.68	
	1	Tessa Cieplucha	Canada	Disqualified	
