= Katii Tang =

Hong Kong swimmer (born 2001)

Personal information
- Full name: Katii Tang Tsoi-lam
- Born: 29 August 2001 (age 24) Hong Kong
- Height: 169 cm (5 ft 7 in) (2018)
- Weight: 56 kg (123 lb) (2018)

Sport
- Sport: Swimming
- Strokes: Freestyle
Medal record
Representing Hong Kong
Asian Games
Bronze medal – third place	2018 Jakarta	4x200m freestyle relay

Katii Tang Tsoi-lam (Chinese: 鄧采淋; born 29 August 2001), is a Hong Kong female swimmer. She graduated from Victoria Shanghai Academy. From September 2019, she started studying in the University of Michigan.

== Biography ==
Katii Tang started to learn swimming at the age of four. She initially thought practising swimming daily was exhausting and boring. However, having won five gold medals in a competition, she started to enjoy swimming for its sense of accomplishment.

In August 2015, Tang participated in the 100m freestyle, 400m freestyle, 800m freestyle, and 1500m freestyle event and five relay events in the 2015 FINA World Junior Swimming Championships. The best result was ranking 25th in the 1500m freestyle event.

In November 2016, Tang along with Chan Kin Lok, Claudia Lau, and Sze Hang Yu came 3rd in the 4 × 200 m freestyle relay event of the 2016 Asian Swimming Championships with a time of 8:16.37. Tang ranked 7th in the 200m freestyle and 800m freestyle event.

In September 2017, Tang ranked 6th in the 200m freestyle event of the 2017 Asian Indoor and Martial Arts Games. Later that month, she achieved his personal best in the 800m freestyle event of the 2017 FINA Swimming World Cup Hong Kong meet with a time of 8:43.01, ranking 3rd.

In August 2018, Tang along with Camille Cheng, Ho Nam Wai, and Sze Hang Yu, representing Hong Kong, came 3rd in 4 × 200 m freestyle relay event in Swimming at the 2018 Asian Games.

== Swimming records ==
Tang has held one junior record and one Inter-school Swimming Competition record.

		Event	Time	Date
Junior records
1	Long course	4 × 200 m freestyle relay (Happy Valley Athletic Association–Tang Tsoi Lam Katii; Kan Cheuk Tung Natalie; Yip Charis Gabrielle Chak Yan; Chong, Sum Yee)	8:40.12	2017-07-15
Inter-school Swimming Competition
1	Long course	100m freestyle (Victoria Shanghai Academy–Tang Tsoi Lam Katii)	57.60	2018-10-18
