= Li Bingjie =

Chinese swimmer (born 2002)

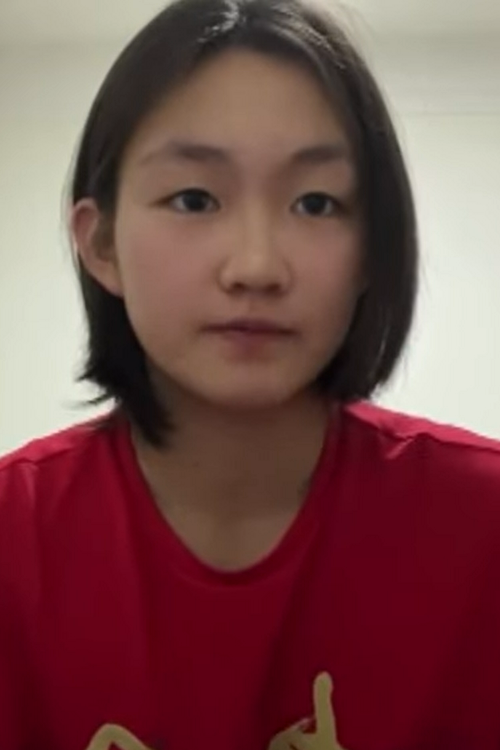
- Li in 2021

Personal information
- Nationality: Chinese
- Born: 3 March 2002 (age 24) Baoding, Hebei, China
- Height: 173 cm (5 ft 8 in)

Sport
- Sport: Swimming
- Strokes: Freestyle
Medal record
Women's swimming
Representing China
Event	1st	2nd	3rd
Olympic Games	1	0	2
World Championships (LC)	2	7	4
World Championships (SC)	3	0	2
Asian Games	12	4	0
Total	18	11	8
Women's swimming
Representing China
Olympic Games
Gold medal – first place	2020 Tokyo	4×200 m freestyle
Bronze medal – third place	2020 Tokyo	400 m freestyle
Bronze medal – third place	2024 Paris	4×200 m freestyle
World Championships (LC)
Gold medal – first place	2024 Doha	4×200 m freestyle
Gold medal – first place	2024 Doha	4×100 m mixed freestyle
Silver medal – second place	2017 Budapest	800 m freestyle
Silver medal – second place	2017 Budapest	4×200 m freestyle
Silver medal – second place	2023 Fukuoka	800 m freestyle
Silver medal – second place	2024 Doha	400 m freestyle
Silver medal – second place	2024 Doha	1500 m freestyle
Silver medal – second place	2025 Singapore	200 m freestyle
Silver medal – second place	2025 Singapore	400 m freestyle
Bronze medal – third place	2017 Budapest	400 m freestyle
Bronze medal – third place	2023 Fukuoka	1500 m freestyle
Bronze medal – third place	2023 Fukuoka	4×200 m freestyle
Bronze medal – third place	2025 Singapore	4×200 m freestyle
World Championships (SC)
Gold medal – first place	2018 Hangzhou	4×200 m freestyle
Gold medal – first place	2021 Abu Dhabi	400 m freestyle
Gold medal – first place	2021 Abu Dhabi	800 m freestyle
Bronze medal – third place	2018 Hangzhou	400 m freestyle
Bronze medal – third place	2021 Abu Dhabi	4x200 m freestyle
Asian Games
Gold medal – first place	2018 Jakarta	200 m freestyle
Gold medal – first place	2018 Jakarta	4×200 m freestyle
Gold medal – first place	2022 Hangzhou	400 m freestyle
Gold medal – first place	2022 Hangzhou	800 m freestyle
Gold medal – first place	2022 Hangzhou	1500 m freestyle
Gold medal – first place	2022 Hangzhou	4×100 m freestyle
Gold medal – first place	2022 Hangzhou	4×200 m freestyle
Gold medal – first place	2026 Aichi–Nagoya	400 m freestyle
Gold medal – first place	2026 Aichi–Nagoya	800 m freestyle
Gold medal – first place	2026 Aichi–Nagoya	1500 m freestyle
Gold medal – first place	2026 Aichi–Nagoya	4×100 m freestyle
Gold medal – first place	2026 Aichi–Nagoya	4×200 m freestyle
Silver medal – second place	2018 Jakarta	400 m freestyle
Silver medal – second place	2018 Jakarta	800 m freestyle
Silver medal – second place	2018 Jakarta	1500 m freestyle
Silver medal – second place	2022 Hangzhou	200 m freestyle
Junior Pan Pacific Championships
Gold medal – first place	2016 Maui	200 m freestyle
Gold medal – first place	2016 Maui	400 m freestyle
Gold medal – first place	2016 Maui	800 m freestyle
World University Games
Gold medal – first place	2021 Chengdu	400 m freestyle
Gold medal – first place	2021 Chengdu	800 m freestyle
Gold medal – first place	2021 Chengdu	1500 m freestyle
Gold medal – first place	2021 Chengdu	4×100 m freestyle
Gold medal – first place	2021 Chengdu	4×200 m freestyle
Gold medal – first place	2021 Chengdu	4×100 m medley
Gold medal – first place	2021 Chengdu	4×100 m mixed freestyle
Gold medal – first place	2021 Chengdu	4×100 m mixed medley

Li Bingjie (Chinese: 李冰洁, born 3 March 2002) is a Chinese swimmer. She is former world record holder in the short course 400 metre freestyle. She is also the Asian record holder in the long course 400 metre freestyle as well as the short course 1500 metre freestyle. She is the 2021 World Short Course champion in the 400 metre freestyle and 800 metre freestyle. At the 2020 Summer Olympics, she won a gold medal in the 4×200 metre freestyle relay and a bronze medal in the 400 metre freestyle.

== Career ==
At the 2016 Junior Pan Pacific Swimming Championships, in Hawaii, United States, Bingjie won gold medals in the 200 metre freestyle with a 1:58.23, 400 metre freestyle with a 4:07.52, and the 800 metre freestyle with a 8:28.12.

Bingjie competed at the 2017 World Aquatics Championships, winning two silver medals and a bronze. In 2018, she competed in the World Short Course Championships in Hangzhou and won a bronze medal in the Women's 400 meter freestyle. She added a gold medal in the women's 4 x 200 meter relay, swimming the first leg. In the 2018 Asian Games in Jakarta, Li won her first gold title in the 200m Women's Freestyle with a time of 1:56.74.

=== 2021–2022 ===
In 2021, Bingjie won the bronze medal in the 400 metre freestyle at the 2020 Summer Olympics with a time of 4:01.08, finishing 4.39 seconds behind gold medalist Ariarne Titmus of Australia. She was also a gold medalist in the 4×200 metre freestyle relay, splitting a 1:55.30 for the anchor leg of the relay to help set a new world record of 7:40.33. Later in the year, at the 2021 World Short Course Championships in December, she won the world title and gold medal in the 800 metre freestyle with a Championships record time of 8:02.90, which was 0.51 seconds faster than the former record set seven years earlier by Mireia Belmonte of Spain. The following day, she won the gold medal and world title in the 400 metre freestyle as well, finishing over two seconds ahead of silver medalist Summer McIntosh of Canada with a time 3:55.83.

On 27 October 2022, at the 2022 Chinese National Swimming Championships, Bingjie won the gold medal in the short course 400 metre freestyle with a world record time of 3:51.30, lowering the former record of 3:53.92 set by Ariarne Titmus in 2018 by 2.62 seconds. The following day, she set a new Asian record and Chinese record in the 1500 metre freestyle with a time of 15:41.80 and a new Chinese record in the 200 metre freestyle with a time of 1:51.25.

Originally entered to compete in four individual events at the 2022 World Short Course Championships, the 200 metre freestyle, 400 metre freestyle, 800 metre freestyle, and the first-ever female 1500 metre freestyle at a World Short Course Championships, Bingjie was unable to compete after arriving in Melbourne, Australia due to contracting COVID-19.

== International championships (50 m) ==
Meet	200 freestyle	400 freestyle	800 freestyle	1500 freestyle	4×100 freestyle	4×200 freestyle	Mixed 4×100 freestyle
Junior level
PACJ 2016	1st place, gold medalist(s)	1st place, gold medalist(s)	1st place, gold medalist(s)		5th	5th	
Senior level
WC 2017	11th	3rd place, bronze medalist(s)	2nd place, silver medalist(s)			2nd place, silver medalist(s)	
AG 2018	1st place, gold medalist(s)	2nd place, silver medalist(s)	2nd place, silver medalist(s)	2nd place, silver medalist(s)		1st place, gold medalist(s)	
WC 2019	11th	9th	15th			4th	
OG 2020	20th	3rd place, bronze medalist(s)	10th	10th		1st place, gold medalist(s)	
WC 2022		10th	5th	9th		4th	
WC 2023		5th	2nd place, silver medalist(s)	3rd place, bronze medalist(s)		3rd place, bronze medalist(s)	
AG 2022	2nd place, silver medalist(s)	1st place, gold medalist(s)	1st place, gold medalist(s)	1st place, gold medalist(s)	1st place, gold medalist(s)	1st place, gold medalist(s)	
WC 2024	9th	2nd place, silver medalist(s)		2nd place, silver medalist(s)		1st place, gold medalist(s)	1st place, gold medalist(s)
WC 2025	2nd place, silver medalist(s)	2nd place, silver medalist(s)	5th	4th		3rd place, bronze medalist(s)	

== International championships (25 m) ==
Meet	200 freestyle	400 freestyle	800 freestyle	400 medley	4×200 freestyle
WC 2016		15th		13th	
WC 2018		3rd place, bronze medalist(s)	4th		1st place, gold medalist(s)
WC 2021		1st place, gold medalist(s)	1st place, gold medalist(s)		3rd place, bronze medalist(s)
WC 2022	DNS	DNS			

== Personal bests ==
As of 27 October 2022

=== Long course (50-meter pool) ===
Event	Time	Meet	Date	Note(s)
50 m freestyle	26.47	2019 Champions Swim Series	28 April 2019	
100 m freestyle	54.78	2021 Chinese National Swimming Championships	5 May 2021	
200 m freestyle	1:56.64	2021 Chinese National Swimming Championships	4 May 2021	
400 m freestyle	3:59.99	2025 Chinese National Swimming Championships	17 May 2025	NR, AS
800 m freestyle	8:13.31	2023 World Aquatics Championships	29 July 2023	AS
1500 m freestyle	15:45.71	2023 World Aquatics Championships	25 July 2023	
400 m individual medley	4:55.25	2016-2017 Div 1 Age Group Swimming	18 June 2016	

=== Short course (25-meter pool) ===
Event	Time	Meet	Date	Note(s)
50 m freestyle	26.29	2018 World Cup	18 November 2018	
100 m freestyle	54.95	2017 World Cup	18 November 2017	
200 m freestyle	1:51.25	2022 Chinese Swimming Championships	28 October 2022	NR
400 m freestyle	3:51.30	2022 Chinese Swimming Championships	27 October 2022	WR
800 m freestyle	8:02:90	2021 World Championships	18 December 2021	
1500 m freestyle	15:41.80	2022 Chinese Swimming Championships	28 October 2022	AS, NR
50 m butterfly	28.92	2016 World Cup	30 September 2016	
100 m butterfly	1:02.41	2016 World Championships	6 December 2016	
200 m individual medley	2:14.94	2016 World Cup	30 September 2016	
400 m individual medley	4:40.03	2016 World Championships	6 December 2016	

Legend: WR – World record; AS – Asian record; NR – Chinese record;
Records not set in finals: h – heat; sf – semifinal; r – relay 1st leg; rh – relay heat 1st leg; b – B final; † – en route to final mark; so – swim-off; tt – time trial

== Swimming World Cup circuits ==
The following medals Bingjie has won at Swimming World Cup circuits.

Edition	Gold medals	Silver medals	Bronze medals	Total
2015	0	1	0	1
2016	0	1	0	1
2017	2	4	1	7
2018	1	0	0	1
Total	3	6	1	10

== World records ==
=== Long course (50-meter pool) ===
No.	Event	Time	Meet	Location	Date	Status	Ref
1	4×200 m freestyle	7:40.33	2020 Summer Olympics	Tokyo, Japan	29 July 2021	Former	

=== Short course (25-meter pool) ===
No.	Event	Time	Meet	Location	Date	Status	Ref
1	400 m freestyle	3:51.30	2022 Chinese Swimming Championships	Beijing	27 October 2022	Current	

Records
Preceded by (Australia) Ariarne Titmus	Women's 400-metre freestyle world record-holder (short course); 27 October 2022 – 10 December 2024	Succeeded by (Canada) Summer McIntosh
