= Waka Kobori =

Japanese swimmer (born 2000)

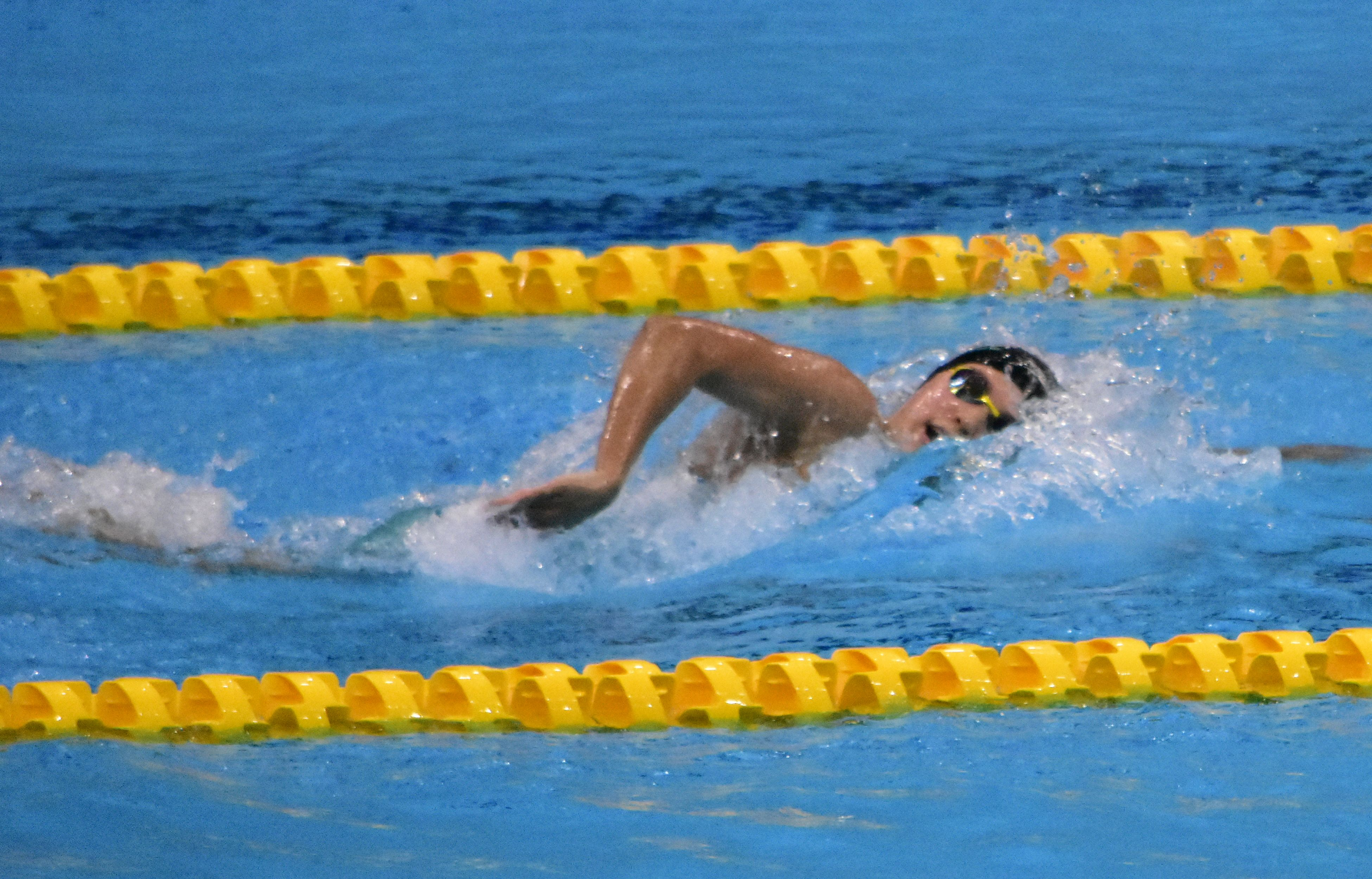
- Kobori in 2023

Personal information
- Born: 10 August 2000 (age 26)

Sport
- Sport: Swimming
- Strokes: Freestyle
Medal record
Women's swimming
Representing Japan
World Championships (SC)
Bronze medal – third place	2022 Melbourne	400 m medley
Asian Games
Silver medal – second place	2018 Jakarta	4×200 m freestyle
Silver medal – second place	2022 Hangzhou	800m freestyle
Silver medal – second place	2022 Hangzhou	4×200 m freestyle
Silver medal – second place	2026 Aichi–Nagoya	4×200 m freestyle
Bronze medal – third place	2018 Jakarta	800 m freestyle
Bronze medal – third place	2018 Jakarta	1500 m freestyle
Bronze medal – third place	2022 Hangzhou	400m freestyle
Universiade
Gold medal – first place	2019 Naples	800 m freestyle
Gold medal – first place	2019 Naples	1500 m freestyle
World Junior Championships
Bronze medal – third place	2017 Indianapolis	4×200 m freestyle

Waka Kobori (小堀 倭加, Kobori Waka; born 10 August 2000) is a Japanese swimmer. She competed in the women's 1500 metre freestyle event at the 2018 Asian Games, winning the bronze medal. She qualified to represent Japan at the 2020 Summer Olympics.
