= Wang Jianjiahe =

Chinese swimmer

Wang Jianjiahe 王简嘉禾
Personal information
- Full name: 王简嘉禾; Wang Jianjiahe
- National team: China
- Born: 17 July 2002 (age 23) Anshan, Liaoning
- Height: 1.82 m (6 ft 0 in)
- Weight: 66 kg (146 lb)

Sport
- Sport: Swimming
- Strokes: Freestyle
- Club: Liaoning Swimming Team
Medal record
Women's swimming
Representing China
World Championships
Bronze medal – third place	2019 Gwangju	1500 m freestyle
World Championships (SC)
Gold medal – first place	2018 Hangzhou	800 m freestyle
Gold medal – first place	2018 Hangzhou	4×200 m freestyle
Silver medal – second place	2018 Hangzhou	400 m freestyle
Asian Games
Gold medal – first place	2018 Jakarta	400 m freestyle
Gold medal – first place	2018 Jakarta	800 m freestyle
Gold medal – first place	2018 Jakarta	1500 m freestyle
Gold medal – first place	2018 Jakarta	4×200 m freestyle

Wang Jianjiahe (Chinese: 王简嘉禾; pinyin: Wáng Jiǎn Jiā Hé; born 17 July 2002) is a Chinese swimmer. She competed in the women's 1500 metre freestyle event at the 2018 Asian Games, winning the gold medal. She competed in the 2018 Fina Short Course World Championships in Hangzhou, China her home country and won her first World Championship gold in the Women's 800 meter freestyle gold, and won silver in the Women's 400 meter freestyle. She also added a gold in the women's 4 x 200 meter freestyle relay, swimming the anchor leg. At the 2018 FINA Swimming World Cup she won silver in the 400m freestyle and a gold in the 800 metre freestyle.

== Personal bests ==
As of 30 July 2021

=== Long course (50-meter pool) ===
Event	Time	Meet	Date	Note(s)
50 m freestyle	27.90	2018 Asian Games	24 August 2018	
100 m freestyle	54.77	2018 Chinese National Swimming Championships	13 October 2018	
200 m freestyle	1:57.31	2018 Chinese National Swimming Championships	22 June 2018	
400 m freestyle	4:03.14	2018 Atlanta PSS	3 March 2018	
800 m freestyle	8:14.64	2019 Chinese National Swimming Championships	30 March 2019	
1500 m freestyle	15:41.49	2020 Summer Olympics	26 July 2021	AS

=== Short course (25-meter pool) ===
Event	Time	Meet	Date	Note(s)
50 m freestyle	26.60	2018 World Championships	11 December 2018	
100 m freestyle	55.39	2018 World Cup	29 September 2018	
200 m freestyle	1:53.23	2018 World Championships	11 December 2018	
400 m freestyle	3:53.97	2018 World Cup	4 October 2018	
800 m freestyle	7:59:44	2018 World Cup	6 October 2018	AS

Key: NR = National Record; AS = Asian Record
