= Tinky Ho =

Hong Kong swimmer (born 2002)

Personal information
- Full name: Tinky Ho Nam Wai
- Born: 30 April 2002 (age 24) Hong Kong

Sport
- Sport: Swimming
Medal record
Asian Games
| Bronze medal – third place | 2018 Jakarta | 4×100 m freestyle |
| Bronze medal – third place | 2018 Jakarta | 4×200 m freestyle |

Tinky Ho Nam Wai (born 30 April 2002) is a Hong Kong swimmer that participated in the 2021 Tokyo olympics. She competed in the 800 metre and 1500 metre freestyle event at both 2017 and 2019 World Aquatics Championships, finishing 31st and 20th in 2017, and 30th and 25th in 2019 respectively. She also competed in 2018 Hangzhou and 2022 Melbourne short course world championships.
