= Han Da-kyung =

South Korean swimmer (born 2000)

Personal information
- Nationality: South Korean
- Born: January 31, 2000 (age 26) South Korea

Sport
- Sport: Swimming
- Events: Freestyle; Freestyle relay
Medal record
Women's swimming
Representing South Korea
Asian Games
Bronze medal – third place	2022 Hangzhou	4×200 m freestyle
Bronze medal – third place	2026 Aichi–Nagoya	4×200 m freestyle

Korean name
- Hangul: 한다경
- RR: Han Dagyeong
- MR: Han Tagyŏng

Han Da-kyung (Korean: 한다경; born January 31, 2000) is a South Korean swimmer.

== Career ==
She represented South Korea at the 2018 Asian Games held in Jakarta, Indonesia. She competed in the women's 800 metre freestyle and 1500 metre freestyle events and in both events she finished in 6th place. She also competed in the women's 4 × 200 metre freestyle relay event.

In 2019, she represented South Korea at the World Aquatics Championships held in Gwangju, South Korea. She competed in the women's 800 metre freestyle and women's 1500 metre freestyle events. In both events she did not advance to compete in the final.

In July 2021, she represented South Korea at the 2020 Summer Olympics held in Tokyo, Japan. She competed in the women's 400 metre freestyle, women's 800 metre freestyle, women's 1500 metre freestyle and 4 × 200 metre freestyle relay events. In the three freestyle events, she did not advance to compete in the semifinal. In the freestyle relay event, the team did not advance to compete in the final.
