= Gan Ching Hwee =

Singaporean swimmer (born 2003)

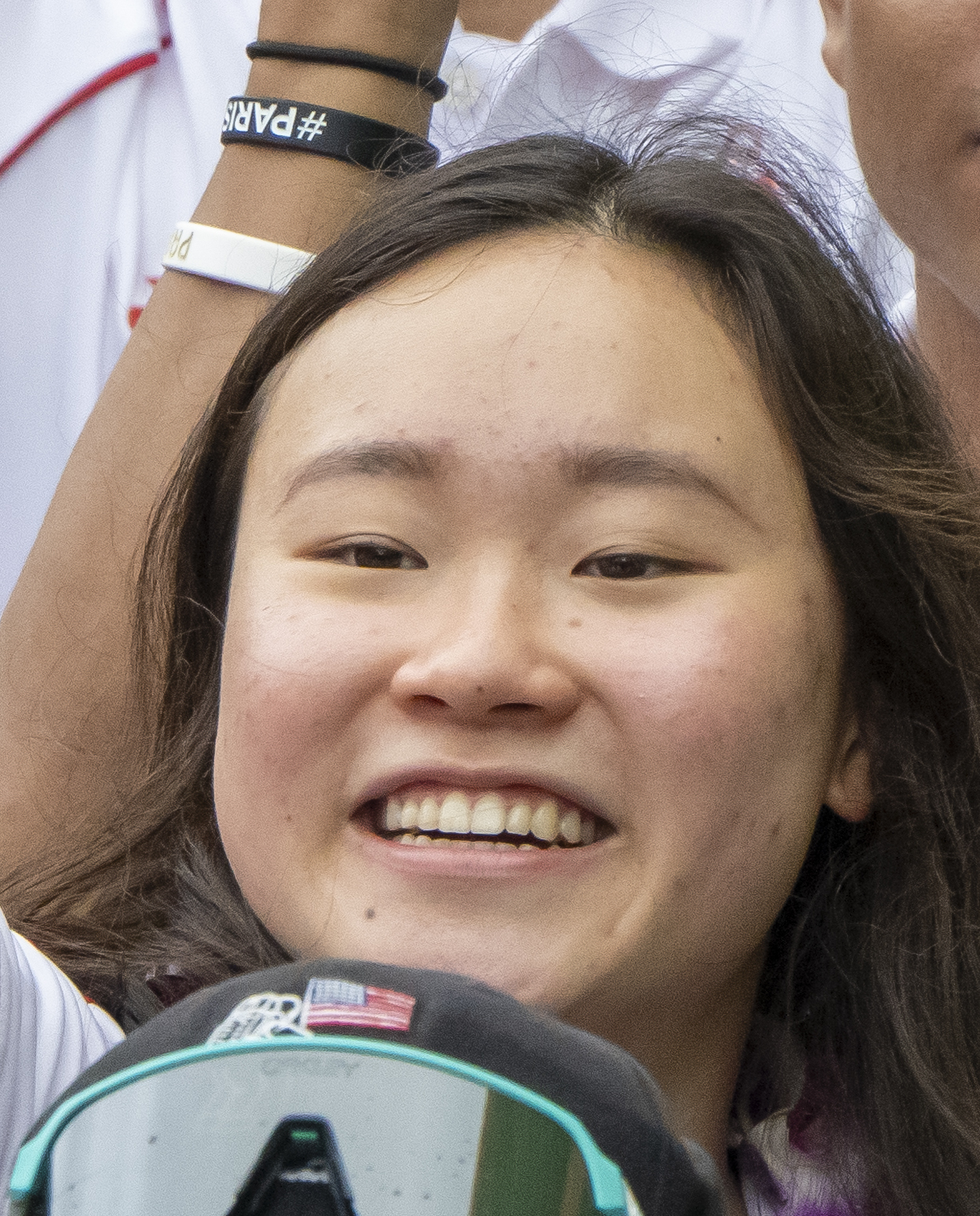
- Gan in 2024

Personal information
- Born: 22 July 2003 (age 23) Singapore
- Height: 163 cm (5 ft 4 in)
- Weight: 55 kg (121 lb)

Sport
- Sport: Swimming
- Strokes: Individual medley, freestyle
- College team: Indiana University
Medal record
Women's swimming
Representing Singapore
Event	1st	2nd	3rd
Asian Games	0	3	0
Southeast Asian Games	14	3	1
Total	14	6	1
Asian Games
Silver medal – second place	2026 Aichi–Nagoya	400 m freestyle
Silver medal – second place	2026 Aichi–Nagoya	800 m freestyle
Silver medal – second place	2026 Aichi–Nagoya	1500 m freestyle
Southeast Asian Games
Gold medal – first place	2019 Philippines	800 m freestyle
Gold medal – first place	2019 Philippines	4×200 m freestyle
Gold medal – first place	2021 Vietnam	200 m freestyle
Gold medal – first place	2021 Vietnam	400 m freestyle
Gold medal – first place	2021 Vietnam	800 m freestyle
Gold medal – first place	2021 Vietnam	1500 m freestyle
Gold medal – first place	2021 Vietnam	4×200 m freestyle
Gold medal – first place	2023 Cambodia	200 m freestyle
Gold medal – first place	2023 Cambodia	400 m freestyle
Gold medal – first place	2023 Cambodia	800 m freestyle
Gold medal – first place	2023 Cambodia	4×200 m freestyle
Gold medal – first place	2025 Thailand	200 m freestyle
Gold medal – first place	2025 Thailand	400 m freestyle
Gold medal – first place	2025 Thailand	800 m freestyle
Silver medal – second place	2019 Philippines	400 m freestyle
Silver medal – second place	2025 Thailand	4×100 m freestyle
Silver medal – second place	2025 Thailand	mixed relay open water
Bronze medal – third place	2017 Kuala Lumpur	400 m medley

Gan Ching Hwee (Chinese: 颜欣慧; pinyin: Yán Xīnhuì; born 22 July 2003) is a Singaporean swimmer.

== Education ==
Gan studied at Tao Nan School, Methodists Girls' School and Anglo-Chinese School (Independent) in Singapore. She studied nutrition science at Indiana University and graduated in May 2025.

== Swimming career ==
Gan competed in the women's 1500 metre freestyle at the 2019 World Aquatics Championships. She won the women's 800m freestyle in the Liberty Insurance 50th Singapore National Age Group Swimming Championships and broke her own U-17 national record at 8:42.23.

In 2021, Gan failed to qualify for the 2020 Summer Olympics held in Tokyo, Japan but was invited by FINA to participate in the Olympic Games. Based on Singapore Swimming Association's (SSA) selection policy, Gan was selected for the Olympics. As Gan was selected, Quah Ting Wen missed out on going to Olympics. Quah appealed to the SSA appeals committee that based on FINA's priority order, she should be chosen over Gan and was successful. As a result, Gan was not selected for the 2020 Olympic Games.

On 4 July 2024, World Aquatics (Aqua) (formerly FINA) confirmed that Singapore can send a women’s 4 × 100 m medley relay team to the 2024 Summer Olympics held at Paris, France. As the team consisted of three relay-only swimmers, which exceeded Aqua's maximum of two, Singapore Aquatics (SAQ) (formerly SSA) was given special dispensation by Aqua to send the team. This team consisted of Quah Ting Wen, Quah Jing Wen, Letitia Sim and Levenia Sim. On 5 July, Gan received an invitation again by Aqua for the women’s 1500m freestyle event at the Olympics Games.

As Gan received an invitation, Singapore would not need special dispensation to send the medley relay team as Gan could replace Quah Ting Wen for her freestyle leg, within Aqua's rules of maximum two relay-only swimmers. Gan was selected over Quah and Quah lodged an appeal with SAQ. After two separate appeals by Quah rejected by SAQ, Gan was confirmed of her spot at the Olympics Games on 8 July.

On her Olympics debut at the 2024 Summer Olympics women's 1500 metre freestyle event, Gan broke the national record at 16:10:13 during the heats, but missed out on progressing to the finals by one spot. In the women's 800 metre freestyle event, she also broke the national record at 8:32:37 during the heats, placing her 11th and did not progress to the finals.

During the 2026 Asian Games, Gan won her first Asian Games medal at the women's 1500 metre freestyle event. She broke the national record at 16:00.45 in the finals and won the silver medal. Gan later won another silver medal at the women's 400 metre freestyle event. She broke the national record again at 4:06.81, breaking her previous national record 4:09.34 achieved at the 2026 Commonwealth Games earlier. Gan won her third silver at the women's 800 metre freestyle event, breaking her prior national record clocked at the 2026 Commonwealth Games earlier with her third national record of 8:26.25.
