= Hong Kong at the 2023 World Aquatics Championships =

- Flag of Hong Kong
- World Aquatics code: HKG
- National federation: Hong Kong Amateur Swimming Association

in Fukuoka, Japan
- Competitors: 15 in 3 sports
- Medals Ranked 21st: Gold 0 Silver 1 Bronze 0 Total 1

World Aquatics Championships appearances
- 1973; 1975; 1978; 1982; 1986; 1991; 1994; 1998; 2001; 2003; 2005; 2007; 2009; 2011; 2013; 2015; 2017; 2019; 2022; 2023; 2024; 2025

Hong Kong competed at the 2023 World Aquatics Championships in Fukuoka, Japan from 14 to 30 July.

== Medalists ==
Medal	Name	Sport	Event	Date
Silver	Siobhán Haughey	Swimming	Women's 100 m freestyle	July 28

== Diving ==
Hong Kong entered 2 divers.

Men

Athlete	Event	Preliminaries		Semifinals		Final	
Athlete	Event	Points	Rank	Points	Rank	Points	Rank
Curtis Yuen	1 m springboard	237.05	55	—		did not advance	
Curtis Yuen	3 m springboard	277.35	56	did not advance			
Robben Yiu; Curtis Yuen	3 m synchronized springboard	229.89	26	—		did not advance	

== Open water swimming ==
Hong Kong entered 4 open water swimmers.

Men

Athlete	Event	Time	Rank
Keith Sin	Men's 5 km	1:01:28.8	55
Keith Sin	Men's 10 km	2:05:36.1	54
William Yan Thorley	Men's 5 km	1:01:28.4	54
William Yan Thorley	Men's 10 km	2:04:20.4	48

Women

Athlete	Event	Time	Rank
Nikita Lam	Women's 5 km	1:02:34.7	40
Nikita Lam	Women's 10 km	2:10:08.8	39
Nip Tsz Yin	Women's 5 km	1:02:15.7	28
Nip Tsz Yin	Women's 10 km	2:07:06.3	29

Mixed

Athlete	Event	Time	Rank
Nikita Lam; Nip Tsz Yin; Keith Sin; William Yan Thorley	Team relay	1:19:31.8	19

== Swimming ==
Hong Kong entered 9 swimmers.

Men

Athlete	Event	Heat		Semifinal		Final	
Athlete	Event	Time	Rank	Time	Rank	Time	Rank
Adam Chillingworth	100 metre breaststroke	1:02.43	39	Did not advance			
Adam Chillingworth	200 metre breaststroke	2:12.30	20	Did not advance			
Ian Ho	50 metre freestyle	22.12	19	Did not advance			
Ian Ho	100 metre freestyle	50.21	47	Did not advance			
Ian Ho	50 metre butterfly	24.20	49	Did not advance			
Lau Shiu Yue	50 metre backstroke	26.70	45	Did not advance			
Lau Shiu Yue	100 metre backstroke	58.21	50	Did not advance			

Women

Athlete	Event	Heat		Semifinal		Final	
Athlete	Event	Time	Rank	Time	Rank	Time	Rank
Stephanie Au	50 metre backstroke	28.63	27	Did not advance			
Stephanie Au	100 metre backstroke	1:01.08	23	Did not advance			
Chloe Cheng	200 metre individual medley	2:21.25	32	Did not advance			
Chloe Cheng	400 metre individual medley	5:05.72	32	—		Did not advance	
Siobhán Haughey	100 metre freestyle	53.15	1 Q	52.90	3 Q	52.49	2nd place, silver medalist(s)
Siobhán Haughey	200 metre freestyle	1:56.56	4 Q	1:55.48	5 Q	1:53.96	4
Lam Hoi Kiu	50 metre breaststroke	Disqualified		Did not advance			
Lam Hoi Kiu	100 metre breaststroke	1:12.62	46	Did not advance			
Tam Hoi Lam	50 metre freestyle	25.54	29	Did not advance			
Tam Hoi Lam	50 metre butterfly	26.91	31	Did not advance			
Camille Cheng; Siobhán Haughey; Tam Hoi Lam; Stephanie Au	4 × 100 m freestyle relay	3:39.93 NR	12	—		Did not advance	
Stephanie Au; Siobhán Haughey; Tam Hoi Lam; Camille Cheng	4 × 100 m medley relay	4:04.89	16	—		Did not advance	

Mixed

Athlete	Event	Heat		Final	
Athlete	Event	Time	Rank	Time	Rank
Lau Shiu Yue; Ian Ho; Camille Cheng; Chloe Cheng	4 × 100 m freestyle relay	3:34.96	22	Did not advance	
