= Hong Kong at the 2019 World Aquatics Championships =

- Flag of Hong Kong
- World Aquatics code: HKG
- National federation: Hong Kong Amateur Swimming Association
- Website: hkasa.org.hk

in Gwangju, South Korea
- Medals: Gold 0 Silver 0 Bronze 0 Total 0

World Aquatics Championships appearances
- 1973; 1975; 1978; 1982; 1986; 1991; 1994; 1998; 2001; 2003; 2005; 2007; 2009; 2011; 2013; 2015; 2017; 2019; 2022; 2023; 2024; 2025

Hong Kong competed at the 2019 World Aquatics Championships in Gwangju, South Korea from 12 to 28 July.

== Artistic swimming ==
Hong Kong's artistic swimming team consisted of 10 female athletes.

Women

Athlete	Event	Preliminaries		Final	
Athlete	Event	Points	Rank	Points	Rank
Haruka Kawazoe; Christie Poon; Eva Chong (R)	Duet free routine	66.7667	42	Did not advance	
Chew Ching Lam; Serena Chin; Eva Chong; Nandini Dulani; Haruka Kawazoe; Christie Poon; Sum On; Tze Yan; Chan Kam (R); Tam Sin (R)	Team free routine	68.7667	25	Did not advance	

Legend: (R) = Reserve Athlete

== Diving ==
Hong Kong entered one diver.

Women

Athlete	Event	Preliminaries		Semifinals		Final	
Athlete	Event	Points	Rank	Points	Rank	Points	Rank
Chan Lam	1 m springboard	142.10	41	—N/a		Did not advance	
Chan Lam	3 m springboard	150.75	49	Did not advance			

== Open water swimming ==
Hong Kong qualified two male and two female open water swimmers.

Men

Athlete	Event	Time	Rank
Keith Sin	Men's 5 km	58:21.6	49
Keith Sin	Men's 10 km	2:00:21.9	63
William Thorley	Men's 5 km	53:56.2	37
William Thorley	Men's 10 km	1:59:36.8	61

Women

Athlete	Event	Time	Rank
Nip Tsz Yin	Women's 5 km	1:02:00.0	44
Nip Tsz Yin	Women's 10 km	2:01:14.6	39
Wong Cho Ying	Women's 5 km	1:04:39.3	47
Wong Cho Ying	Women's 10 km	2:07:43.4	52

Mixed

Athlete	Event	Time	Rank
William Thorley; Keith Sin; Nip Tsz Yin; Wong Cho Ying	Team	1:00:37.9	21

== Swimming ==
Men

Athlete	Event	Heat		Semifinal		Final	
Athlete	Event	Time	Rank	Time	Rank	Time	Rank
Cheuk Ming Ho	200 m freestyle	1:52.34	49	Did not advance			
Cheuk Ming Ho	400 m freestyle	3:55.05	30	—N/a		Did not advance	
Cheuk Ming Ho	800 m freestyle	8:15.22	32	—N/a		Did not advance	
Cheuk Ming Ho	1500 m freestyle	16:03.96	33	—N/a		Did not advance	
Ian Ho Yentou	50 m freestyle	22.59	=38	Did not advance			
Ian Ho Yentou	100 m freestyle	50.38	51	Did not advance			
Nicholas Lim	100 m butterfly	54.36	42	Did not advance			
Nicholas Lim	200 m butterfly	2:01.46	34	Did not advance			
Ng Cheuk Yin	200 m backstroke	2:06.64	39	Did not advance			
Ng Cheuk Yin	50 m butterfly	24.54	45	Did not advance			
Yu Hin Michael Ng	100 m breaststroke	1:04.66	64	Did not advance			
Yu Hin Michael Ng	200 m breaststroke	2:17.41	43	Did not advance			
Nicholas Lim; Ian Ho Yentou; Cheuk Yin Ng; Ming Ho Cheuk	4 × 100 m freestyle relay	3:23.49	24	—N/a		Did not advance	
Cheuk Yin Ng; Michael Ng Yu Hin; Nicholas Lim; Ian Ho Yentou	4 × 100 m medley relay	3:48.01	27	—N/a		Did not advance	

Women

Athlete	Event	Heat		Semifinal		Final	
Athlete	Event	Time	Rank	Time	Rank	Time	Rank
Stephanie Au	50 m backstroke	28.31	18	Did not advance			
Stephanie Au	100 m backstroke	1:01.25	24	Did not advance			
Chan Kin Lok	50 m butterfly	27.17	33	Did not advance			
Chan Kin Lok	100 m butterfly	1:00.64	32	Did not advance			
Siobhán Haughey	100 m freestyle	53.81	12 Q	53.45	=10	Did not advance	
Siobhán Haughey	200 m freestyle	1:56.02	2 Q	1:55.58	3 Q	1:54.98	4
Ho Nam Wai	800 m freestyle	8:53.37	30	—N/a		Did not advance	
Ho Nam Wai	1500 m freestyle	16:59.13	25	—N/a		Did not advance	
Toto Wong	200 m backstroke	2:17.57	35	Did not advance			
Yeung Jamie Zhen Mei	50 m breaststroke	31.61	23	Did not advance			
Yeung Jamie Zhen Mei	100 m breaststroke	1:08.70	24	Did not advance			
Yeung Jamie Zhen Mei	200 m breaststroke	DNS		Did not advance			
Camille Cheng; Siobhán Haughey; Ho Nam Wai; Tam Hoi Lam	4 × 100 m freestyle relay	3:40.40	10	—N/a		Did not advance	
Camille Cheng; Siobhán Haughey; Ho Nam Wai; Stephanie Au	4 × 200 m freestyle relay	8:04.98	11	—N/a		Did not advance	
Stephanie Au; Yeung Jamie Zhen Mei; Chan Kin Lok; Siobhán Haughey	4 × 100 m medley relay	4:03.52	14	—N/a		Did not advance	

Mixed

Athlete	Event	Heat		Final	
Athlete	Event	Time	Rank	Time	Rank
Nicholas Lim; Ian Ho Yentou; Tam Hoi Lam; Camille Cheng	4 × 100 m mixed freestyle relay	3:32.55	16	Did not advance	
Wong Toto Kwan To; Michael Ng; Nicholas Lim; Tam Hoi Lam	4 × 100 m mixed medley relay	3:57.07	23	Did not advance	
