= Hong Kong at the 2025 World Aquatics Championships =

- Flag of Hong Kong
- World Aquatics code: HKG
- National federation: Hong Kong Amateur Swimming Association

in Singapore
- Competitors: 32 in 4 sports
- Medals: Gold 0 Silver 0 Bronze 0 Total 0

World Aquatics Championships appearances
- 1973; 1975; 1978; 1982; 1986; 1991; 1994; 1998; 2001; 2003; 2005; 2007; 2009; 2011; 2013; 2015; 2017; 2019; 2022; 2023; 2024; 2025

Hong Kong competed at the 2025 World Aquatics Championships in Singapore from July 11 to August 3, 2025.

== Competitors ==
The following is the list of competitors in the Championships.

Sport	Men	Women	Total
Artistic swimming	0	12	12
Diving	2	4	6
Open water swimming	2	2	4
Swimming	4	6	10
Total	8	24	32

== Artistic swimming ==
Women

Athlete	Event	Preliminaries		Final	
Athlete	Event	Points	Rank	Points	Rank
Katherine Chu; Hung Sze Ching	Duet technical routine	188.4642	35	Did not advance	
Katherine Chu; Hung Sze Ching	Duet free routine	164.2558	31	Did not advance	

Mixed

Athlete	Event	Preliminaries		Final	
Athlete	Event	Points	Rank	Points	Rank
Katherine Chu; Hung Sze Ching; Lai Hiu Yin; Lam Azland Chi Yeung; Lee Chi Yin; Wong Wing Ka; Yang Zihua; Zhao Meyako	Team technical routine	177.0934	24	Did not advance	
Cheng Jasmine; Cheung Sum Yuet; Lai Hiu Yin; Lam Azland Chi Yeung; Lam Nok Yan Lauren; Lee Chi Yin; Wong Wing Ka; Yang Zihua	Team free routine	144.9394	17	Did not advance	
Katherine Chu; Hung Sze Ching; Lai Hiu Yin; Lee Chi Yin; Wong Wing Ka; Wu Kiu Lok; Yang Zihua; Zhao Meyako	Team acrobatic routine	127.1312	23	Did not advance	

== Diving ==
Men

Athlete	Event	Preliminaries		Semifinals		Final	
Athlete	Event	Points	Rank	Points	Rank	Points	Rank
Robben Yiu	1 m springboard	236.35	57	—		Did not advance	
Robben Yiu	3 m springboard	222.50	65	Did not advance			
Curtis Yuen	1 m springboard	257.00	50	—		Did not advance	
Curtis Yuen	3 m springboard	264.15	62	Did not advance			

Women

Athlete	Event	Preliminaries		Semifinals		Final	
Athlete	Event	Points	Rank	Points	Rank	Points	Rank
Chan Tsz Ming	1 m springboard	216.70	28	—		Did not advance	
Chan Tsz Ming	3 m springboard	187.95	47	Did not advance			
Leung Ka Sin	3 m springboard	153.50	49	Did not advance			
Wang Ziyi	1 m springboard	222.80	22	—		Did not advance	
Chan Tsz Ming; Angel Wang	3 m synchro springboard	202.80	19	—		Did not advance	

Mixed

Athlete	Event	Final	
Athlete	Event	Points	Rank
Robben Yiu; Wang Ziyi	3 m synchro springboard	222.69	15

== Open water swimming ==
Men

Athlete	Event	Heat		Semi-final		Final	
Athlete	Event	Time	Rank	Time	Rank	Time	Rank
Chan Tsun Hin	Men's 3 km knockout sprints	19:34.8	27	Did not advance			
Chan Tsun Hin	Men's 5 km	—				1:07:20.3	64
Chan Tsun Hin	Men's 10 km	—				2:26:43.6	61
Keith Sin	Men's 3 km knockout sprints	18:03.8	23	Did not advance			
Keith Sin	Men's 5 km	—				1:04:19.0	58
Keith Sin	Men's 10 km	—				2:12:31.8	48

Women

Athlete	Event	Heat		Semi-final		Final	
Athlete	Event	Time	Rank	Time	Rank	Time	Rank
Nikita Lam	Women's 3 km knockout sprints	19:23.4	19	Did not advance			
Nikita Lam	Women's 5 km	—				1:12:10.4	53
Nikita Lam	Women's 10 km	—				2:21:04.7	37
Nip Tsz Yin	Women's 3 km knockout sprints	19:02.9	18	Did not advance			
Nip Tsz Yin	Women's 5 km	—				1:08:58.0	40
Nip Tsz Yin	Women's 10 km	—				2:20:52.8	33

Mixed

Athlete	Event	Time	Rank
Keith Sin; Nip Tsz Yin; Nikita Lam; Chan Tsun Hin	Team relay	1:18:48.6	19

== Swimming ==
Hong Kong entered 10 swimmers.

Men

Athlete	Event	Heat		Semi-final		Final	
Athlete	Event	Time	Rank	Time	Rank	Time	Rank
Ian Ho	50 m freestyle	21.82 NR	10 Q	22.15	16	Did not advance	
Ian Ho	100 m freestyle	50.79	51	Did not advance			
Hayden Kwan	100 m backstroke	57.02	50	Did not advance			
Hayden Kwan	200 m backstroke	2:03.09	37	Did not advance			
Adam Mak	100 m breaststroke	1:01.17	33	Did not advance			
Adam Mak	200 m breaststroke	2:14.59	25	Did not advance			
Tsui Yik Ki	50 m breaststroke	28.19	46	Did not advance			
Tsui Yik Ki	50 m butterfly	26.71	82	Did not advance			
Kwan Hayden; Adam Mak; Ian Ho; Tsui Yik Ki	4 × 100 m medley relay	3:45.63	24	—		Did not advance	

Women

Athlete	Event	Heat		Semi-final		Final	
Athlete	Event	Time	Rank	Time	Rank	Time	Rank
Stephanie Au	50 m backstroke	29.45	37	Did not advance			
Cindy Cheung	100 m backstroke	1:02.79	33	Did not advance			
Cindy Cheung	200 m backstroke	2:14.73	31	Did not advance			
Candice Gao	100 m breaststroke	1:10.86	43	Did not advance			
Candice Gao	200 m breaststroke	2:34.03	29	Did not advance			
Li Sum Yiu	50 m freestyle	25.54	30	Did not advance			
Li Sum Yiu	100 m freestyle	55.58	31	Did not advance			
Lai Wa Ng	200 m individual medley	2:22.55	34	Did not advance			
Lai Wa Ng	400 m individual medley	4:57.66	22	—		Did not advance	
Yeung Hoi Ching	50 m butterfly	27.22	38	Did not advance			
Yeung Hoi Ching	100 m butterfly	1:00.31	33	Did not advance			
Yeung Hoi Ching	200 m butterfly	2:13.46	20	Did not advance			
Cindy Cheung; Candice Gao; Yeung Hoi Ching; Li Sum Yiu	4 × 100 m medley relay	4:11.58	20	—		Did not advance	

Mixed

Athlete	Event	Heat		Final	
Athlete	Event	Time	Rank	Time	Rank
Hayden Kwan; Tsui Yik Ki; Li Sum Yiu; Ng Lai Wa	4 × 100 m freestyle relay	Disqualified		Did not advance	
Hayden Kwan; Adam Mak; Yeung Hoi Ching; Li Sum Yiu	4 × 100 m medley relay	3:52.87	19	Did not advance	
