= Hong Kong at the 2024 World Aquatics Championships =

- Flag of Hong Kong
- FINA code: HKG
- National federation: Hong Kong Amateur Swimming Association

in Doha, Qatar
- Competitors: 20 in 3 sports
- Medals Ranked 20th: Gold 1 Silver 1 Bronze 1 Total 3

World Aquatics Championships appearances
- 1973; 1975; 1978; 1982; 1986; 1991; 1994; 1998; 2001; 2003; 2005; 2007; 2009; 2011; 2013; 2015; 2017; 2019; 2022; 2023; 2024

Hong Kong competed at the 2024 World Aquatics Championships in Doha, Qatar from 2 to 18 February.

== Medalists ==
Medal	Name	Sport	Event	Date
1st place, gold medalist(s)	Siobhán Haughey	Swimming	Women's 200 metre freestyle	14 February 2024
2nd place, silver medalist(s)	Siobhán Haughey	Swimming	Women's 100 metre freestyle	16 February 2024
3rd place, bronze medalist(s)	Siobhán Haughey	Swimming	Women's 100 metre breaststroke	13 February 2024

== Competitors ==
The following is the list of competitors in the Championships.

Sport	Men	Women	Total
Diving	2	1	3
Open water swimming	2	2*	4*
Swimming	3	11*	14*
Total	7	13*	20*

- Nip Tsz Yin competed in both open water swimming and pool swimming.

== Diving ==
Men

Athlete	Event	Preliminaries		Semifinals		Final	
Athlete	Event	Points	Rank	Points	Rank	Points	Rank
Robben Yiu	3 m springboard	161.25	69	Did not advance			
Curtis Yuen	1 m springboard	179.00	43	—		Did not advance	
Curtis Yuen	3 m springboard	237.30	63	Did not advance			
Robben Yiu; Curtis Yuen	3 m synchro springboard	—				208.41	26

Women

Athlete	Event	Preliminaries		Semifinals		Final	
Athlete	Event	Points	Rank	Points	Rank	Points	Rank
Chan Tsz Ming	1 m springboard	141.95	44	—		Did not advance	
Chan Tsz Ming	3 m springboard	174.80	50	Did not advance			

== Open water swimming ==
Men

Athlete	Event	Time	Rank
Keith Sin	Men's 5 km	57:04.8	56
Keith Sin	Men's 10 km	2:02:12.3	68
William Yan Thorley	Men's 5 km	55:17.0	44
William Yan Thorley	Men's 10 km	1:52:11.5	39

Women

Athlete	Event	Time	Rank
Nikita Lam	Women's 5 km	1:01:25.0	43
Nikita Lam	Women's 10 km	2:08:05.8	50
Nip Tsz Yin	Women's 5 km	59:18.7	35
Nip Tsz Yin	Women's 10 km	2:05:10.6	39

Mixed

Athlete	Event	Time	Rank
Nikita Lam; Nip Tsz Yin; Keith Sin; William Yan Thorley	Team relay	1:10:10.3	18

== Swimming ==
Hong Kong entered 14 swimmers.

Men

Athlete	Event	Heat		Semifinal		Final	
Athlete	Event	Time	Rank	Time	Rank	Time	Rank
Adam Chillingworth	100 metre breaststroke	1:02.44	35	Did not advance			
Adam Chillingworth	200 metre breaststroke	2:11.98	11 Q	2:12.14	14	Did not advance	
Ian Ho	50 metre freestyle	21.83	5 Q	21.84	11	Did not advance	
Ian Ho	100 metre freestyle	51.77	55	Did not advance			
Lau Shiu Yue	50 metre backstroke	26.74	37	Did not advance			
Lau Shiu Yue	100 metre backstroke	57.76	41	Did not advance			

Women

Athlete	Event	Heat		Semifinal		Final	
Athlete	Event	Time	Rank	Time	Rank	Time	Rank
Stephanie Au	50 metre backstroke	28.27	7 Q	28.48	15	Did not advance	
Stephanie Au	100 metre backstroke	1:01.80	16 Q	1:01.50	14	Did not advance	
Cindy Cheung	200 metre backstroke	2:13.11	15 Q	2:13.85	16	Did not advance	
Siobhán Haughey	100 metre freestyle	53.70	3 Q	52.92	2 Q	52.56	2nd place, silver medalist(s)
Siobhán Haughey	200 metre freestyle	1:57.62	4 Q	1:56.04	2 Q	1:54.89	1st place, gold medalist(s)
Siobhán Haughey	100 metre breaststroke	1:07.41	12 Q	1:06.41	5 Q	1:05.92 NR	3rd place, bronze medalist(s)
Natalie Kan	100 metre butterfly	1:00.50	26	Did not advance			
Lam Hoi Kiu	50 metre breaststroke	32.57	29	Did not advance			
Lam Hoi Kiu	200 metre breaststroke	2:36.19	25	Did not advance			
Ma Gilaine	400 metre freestyle	4:27.52	29	—		Did not advance	
Mok Sze Ki	200 metre butterfly	2:13.76	18	Did not advance			
Mok Sze Ki	200 metre individual medley	2:29.14	24	Did not advance			
Nip Tsz Yin	1500 metre freestyle	17:04.85	22	—		Did not advance	
Tam Hoi Lam	50 metre freestyle	25.64	27	Did not advance			
Tam Hoi Lam	50 metre butterfly	27.09	27	Did not advance			
Tam Hoi Lam; Camille Cheng; Stephanie Au; Li Sum Yiu	4 × 100 m freestyle relay	3:42.47	9	—		Did not advance	
Gilaine Ma; Li Sum Yiu; Nip Tsz Yin; Mok Sze Ki	4 × 200 m freestyle relay	8:37.41	18	—		Did not advance	
Stephanie Au; Siobhan Haughey; Natalie Kan; Camille Cheng	4 × 100 m medley relay	4:02.34	6 Q	—		4:03.15	8

Mixed

Athlete	Event	Heat		Semifinal		Final	
Athlete	Event	Time	Rank	Time	Rank	Time	Rank
Lau Shiu Yue; Ian Ho; Camille Cheng; Tam Hoi Lam	4 × 100 m freestyle relay	3:32.19 NR	8 Q	—		3:31.13 NR	8
Cindy Cheung; Lau Shiu Yue; Natalie Kan; Ian Ho	4 × 100 m medley relay	4:03.09	19	—		Did not advance	
