= Hong Kong at the 2022 World Aquatics Championships =

- Flag of Hong Kong
- FINA code: HKG
- National federation: Hong Kong Amateur Swimming Association

in Budapest, Hungary
- Competitors: 13 in 2 sports
- Medals: Gold 0 Silver 0 Bronze 0 Total 0

World Aquatics Championships appearances
- 1973; 1975; 1978; 1982; 1986; 1991; 1994; 1998; 2001; 2003; 2005; 2007; 2009; 2011; 2013; 2015; 2017; 2019; 2022; 2023; 2024

Hong Kong competed at the 2022 World Aquatics Championships in Budapest, Hungary from 18 June to 3 July.

== Open water swimming ==
Hong Kong entered 4 open water swimmers (2 male and 2 female)

Men

Athlete	Event	Time	Rank
Keith Sin	5 km	59:38.4	37
Keith Sin	19 km	2:02:08.1	42
William Yan Thorley	5 km	59:42.6	38
William Yan Thorley	10 km	2:01:32.9	38

Women

Athlete	Event	Time	Rank
Nikita Lam	5 km	1:04:03.8	36
Nikita Lam	19 km	2:08:00.1	32
Nip Tsz Yin	5 km	1:00:51.6	16
Nip Tsz Yin	10 km	2:06:58.2	30

Mixed

Athlete	Event	Time	Rank
William Yan Thorley; Nip Tsz Yin; Nikita Lam; Keith Sin	Team	1:11:08.4	15

== Swimming ==
Hong Kong entered 10 swimmers.

Men

Athlete	Event	Heat		Semifinal		Final	
Athlete	Event	Time	Rank	Time	Rank	Time	Rank
Cheuk Ming Ho	200 m freestyle	1:51.60	42	did not advance			
Cheuk Ming Ho	400 m freestyle	3:58.38	32	—		did not advance	
Cheuk Ming Ho	800 m freestyle	8:32.67	28	—		did not advance	
Adam Chillingworth	100 m breaststroke	1:02.91	38	did not advance			
Adam Chillingworth	200 m breaststroke	Disqualified		did not advance			
Ian Ho	50 m freestyle	22.32	23	did not advance			
Ian Ho	100 m freestyle	did not start		did not advance			
Ian Ho	50 m butterfly	24.13	38	did not advance			
Lau Shiu Yue	50 m backstroke	26.41	34	did not advance			
Lau Shiu Yue	100 m backstroke	57.06	35	did not advance			
Nicholas Lim	100 m butterfly	54.77	45	did not advance			
Nicholas Lim; Ian Ho; Lau Shiu Yue; Cheuk Ming Ho	4 × 100 m freestyle relay	Disqualified		—		did not advance	
Lau Shiu Yue; Adam Chillingworth; Nicholas Lim; Ian Ho	4 × 100 m medley relay	Disqualified		—		did not advance	

Women

Athlete	Event	Heat		Semifinal		Final	
Athlete	Event	Time	Rank	Time	Rank	Time	Rank
Stephanie Au	50 m backstroke	28.70	22	did not advance			
Stephanie Au	100 m backstroke	1:01.62	21	did not advance			
Camille Cheng	50 m freestyle	26.20	32	did not advance			
Chloe Cheng	200 m individual medley	2:16.32	24	did not advance			
Chloe Cheng	400 m individual medley	did not start		—		did not advance	
Siobhán Haughey	100 m freestyle	did not start		did not advance			
Siobhán Haughey	200 m freestyle	did not start		did not advance			
Nip Tsz Yin	1500 m freestyle	17:15.64	23	—		did not advance	

Mixed

Athlete	Event	Heat		Final	
Athlete	Event	Time	Rank	Time	Rank
Ian Ho; Nicholas Lim; Camille Cheng; Chloe Cheng	4 × 100 m freestyle relay	3:35.26	16	did not advance	
Stephanie Au; Adam Chillingworth; Nicholas Lim; Camille Cheng	4 × 100 m medley relay	3:54.28	13	did not advance	
