= Hong Kong at the 2013 World Aquatics Championships =

- Flag of Hong Kong
- World Aquatics code: HKG
- National federation: Hong Kong Amateur Swimming Association
- Website: www.hkasa.org.hk

in Barcelona, Spain
- Competitors: 16 in 4 sports
- Medals: Gold 0 Silver 0 Bronze 0 Total 0

World Aquatics Championships appearances
- 1973; 1975; 1978; 1982; 1986; 1991; 1994; 1998; 2001; 2003; 2005; 2007; 2009; 2011; 2013; 2015; 2017; 2019; 2022; 2023; 2024; 2025

Hong Kong competed at the 2013 World Aquatics Championships in Barcelona, Spain between 19 July and 4 August 2013.

== Diving ==
Hong Kong qualified five quota places for the following diving events.

Men

Athlete	Event	Preliminaries		Semifinals		Final	
Athlete	Event	Points	Rank	Points	Rank	Points	Rank
Wai Ching Jason Poon	1 m springboard	282.30	35	—N/a		did not advance	
Xie Zhen	1 m springboard	321.95	20	—N/a		did not advance	
Xie Zhen	3 m springboard	366.00	24	did not advance			
Chow Ho Wing; Wai Ching Jason Poon	3 m synchronized springboard	326.46	15	—N/a		did not advance	

Women

Athlete	Event	Preliminaries		Semifinals		Final	
Athlete	Event	Points	Rank	Points	Rank	Points	Rank
Sharon Chan	1 m springboard	233.15	13	—N/a		did not advance	
Leung Sze Man	1 m springboard	214.75	29	—N/a		did not advance	
Leung Sze Man	3 m springboard	186.45	40	did not advance			
Sharon Chan; Leung Sze Man	3 m synchronized springboard	251.97	12 Q	—N/a		244.71	12

== Open water swimming ==
Hong Kong qualified four quota places for the following events in open water swimming.

Athlete	Event	Time	Rank
Li Chun Hong	Men's 5 km	1:00:15.9	49
Li Chun Hong	Men's 10 km	2:09:17.5	61
Ching Leung Sunny Poon	Men's 5 km	1:00:05.9	46
Ching Leung Sunny Poon	Men's 10 km	2:06:55.8	59
On Yi Fiona Chan	Women's 5 km	DSQ	
On Yi Fiona Chan	Women's 10 km	2:17:39.6	47
Hang Fung Hannah Li	Women's 5 km	1:06:30.6	40
Hang Fung Hannah Li	Women's 10 km	2:25:44.5	49
Li Chun Hong; Ching Leung Sunny Poon; On Yi Fiona Chan	Mixed team	1:05:26.9	22

== Swimming ==
Hong Kong swimmers earned qualifying standards in the following events (up to a maximum of 2 swimmers in each event at the A-standard entry time, and 1 at the B-standard):

Men

Athlete	Event	Heat		Semifinal		Final	
Athlete	Event	Time	Rank	Time	Rank	Time	Rank
Geoffrey Cheah	50 m freestyle	22.90	=35	did not advance			
Geoffrey Cheah	100 m freestyle	49.91	=31	did not advance			
Chun Yan Wong	50 m breaststroke	28.69	47	did not advance			
Chun Yan Wong	100 m breaststroke	1:04.96	53	did not advance			

Women

Athlete	Event	Heat		Semifinal		Final	
Athlete	Event	Time	Rank	Time	Rank	Time	Rank
Hoi Shun Stephanie Au	50 m backstroke	28.39 NR	12 Q	28.33 NR	13	did not advance	
Hoi Shun Stephanie Au	100 m backstroke	1:02.10	25	did not advance			
Chan Kin Lok	50 m butterfly	27.66	=35	did not advance			
Chan Kin Lok	200 m individual medley	2:22.09	40	did not advance			
Man Yi Yvette Kong	50 m breaststroke	32.56	35	did not advance			
Man Yi Yvette Kong	100 m breaststroke	1:10.37	32	did not advance			
Sze Hang Yu	200 m freestyle	2:04.19	33	did not advance			
Sze Hang Yu	100 m butterfly	1:01.01	32	did not advance			
Hoi Shun Stephanie Au; Chan Kin Lok; Man Yi Yvette Kong; Sze Hang Yu	4×100 m medley relay	4:11.76	17	—N/a		did not advance	

== Synchronized swimming ==
Hong Kong has qualified two synchronized swimmers.

Athlete	Event	Preliminaries		Final	
Athlete	Event	Points	Rank	Points	Rank
Man Yee Nora Cho; Hoi Ting Michelle Lau	Duet technical routine	61.800	31	did not advance	
