= Hong Kong at the 2015 World Aquatics Championships =

- Flag of Hong Kong
- World Aquatics code: HKG
- National federation: Hong Kong Amateur Swimming Association
- Website: www.hkasa.org.hk

in Kazan, Russia
- Competitors: 20 in 3 sports
- Medals: Gold 0 Silver 0 Bronze 0 Total 0

World Aquatics Championships appearances
- 1973; 1975; 1978; 1982; 1986; 1991; 1994; 1998; 2001; 2003; 2005; 2007; 2009; 2011; 2013; 2015; 2017; 2019; 2022; 2023; 2024; 2025

Hong Kong competed at the 2015 World Aquatics Championships in Kazan, Russia from 24 July to 9 August 2015.

== Open water swimming ==
Hong Kong has qualified four swimmers to compete in the open water marathon.

Athlete	Event	Time	Rank
Kwan Ho Yin	Men's 5 km	1:02:42.7	43
Kwan Ho Yin	Men's 10 km	2:10:56.5	63
Tse Tsz Fung	Men's 5 km	1:03:10.3	46
Tse Tsz Fung	Men's 10 km	2:11:05.9	64
Kwok Cho Yiu	Women's 5 km	1:09:18.7	35
Kwok Cho Yiu	Women's 10 km	2:22:19.9	51
Lok Hoi Man	Women's 5 km	1:09:10.0	34
Lok Hoi Man	Women's 10 km	2:20:13.2	48
Kwan Ho Yin; Kwok Cho Yiu; Tse Tsz Fung	Mixed team	1:05:43.8	22

== Swimming ==
Hong Kong swimmers have achieved qualifying standards in the following events (up to a maximum of 2 swimmers in each event at the A-standard entry time, and 1 at the B-standard):

Men

Athlete	Event	Heat		Semifinal		Final	
Athlete	Event	Time	Rank	Time	Rank	Time	Rank
Geoffrey Cheah	50 m freestyle	22.68	29	did not advance			
Geoffrey Cheah	100 m freestyle	49.96	37	did not advance			
Geoffrey Cheah	50 m butterfly	24.12	27	did not advance			
Geoffrey Cheah	100 m butterfly	53.76	37	did not advance			

Women

Athlete	Event	Heat		Semifinal		Final	
Athlete	Event	Time	Rank	Time	Rank	Time	Rank
Stephanie Au	50 m backstroke	28.70	22	did not advance			
Stephanie Au	100 m backstroke	1:01.41	27	did not advance			
Camille Cheng	200 m freestyle	2:00.96	32	did not advance			
Siobhán Haughey	50 m freestyle	25.85	37	did not advance			
Siobhán Haughey	100 m freestyle	54.95	18	did not advance			
Siobhán Haughey	200 m individual medley	2:13.07	13 Q	2:13.26	14	did not advance	
Yvette Kong	50 m breaststroke	32.72	44	did not advance			
Yvette Kong	100 m breaststroke	1:11.46	45	did not advance			
Claudia Lau	200 m backstroke	2:14.51	27	did not advance			
Sze Hang Yu	50 m butterfly	27.24	35	did not advance			
Sze Hang Yu	100 m butterfly	59.72	29	did not advance			
Camille Cheng; Stephanie Au; Sze Hang Yu; Siobhán Haughey	4 × 100 m freestyle relay	3:42.11	14	—N/a		did not advance	
Camille Cheng; Stephanie Au; Sze Hang Yu; Siobhán Haughey	4 × 200 m freestyle relay	8:06.51	14	—N/a		did not advance	
Camille Cheng; Stephanie Au; Sze Hang Yu; Siobhán Haughey	4 × 100 m medley relay	4:04.54	20	—N/a		did not advance	

== Synchronized swimming ==
Hong Kong fielded a full team of ten synchronized swimmers to compete in each of the following events.

Women

Athlete	Event	Preliminaries		Final	
Athlete	Event	Points	Rank	Points	Rank
Man Yee Nora Cho	Solo free routine	69.2333	25	did not advance	
Man Yee Nora Cho; Hoi Ting Michelle Lau	Duet technical routine	65.7396	36	did not advance	
Man Yee Nora Cho; Pang Ho Yan	Duet free routine	65.5333	37	did not advance	
Chan Hoi Lam; Cheung Ka Wing; Man Yee Nora Cho*; Kwok Kam Wing; Hoi Ting Michelle Lau; Pang Ho Yan; Pang Tsz Ching; Poon Ho Ching; Wong Yin Ling	Team technical routine	61.2658	25	did not advance	
Chan Hoi Lam; Cheung Ka Wing; Man Yee Nora Cho; Kwok Kam Wing; Hoi Ting Michelle Lau; Pang Ho Yan; Pang Tsz Ching; Poon Ho Ching*; Wong Yin Ling	Team free routine	67.0667	21	did not advance	
