= Swimming at the 2019 World Aquatics Championships – Women's 200 metre freestyle =

Women's 200 metre freestyle at the 2019 World Aquatics Championships
- Venue: Nambu University Municipal Aquatics Center
- Location: Gwangju, South Korea
- Dates: 23 July (heats and semifinals); 24 July (final)
- Competitors: 61 from 57 nations
- Winning time: 1:54.22

Medalists
gold medal	Federica Pellegrini	Italy
silver medal	Ariarne Titmus	Australia
bronze medal	Sarah Sjöström	Sweden

The women's 200 metre freestyle competition at the 2019 World Championships was held on 23 and 24 July 2019.

== Records ==
Prior to the competition, the existing world and championship records were as follows.

World record	Federica Pellegrini (ITA)	1:52.98	Rome, Italy	29 July 2009
Competition record	Federica Pellegrini (ITA)	1:52.98	Rome, Italy	29 July 2009

== Results ==
=== Heats ===
The heats were held on 23 July at 10:17.

Rank	Heat	Lane	Name	Nationality	Time	Notes
1	5	5	Sarah Sjöström	Sweden	1:55.14	Q
2	5	3	Siobhán Haughey	Hong Kong	1:56.02	Q
3	7	4	Ariarne Titmus	Australia	1:56.34	Q
4	5	6	Yang Junxuan	China	1:56.43	Q
5	7	3	Federica Pellegrini	Italy	1:56.81	Q
6	7	2	Penny Oleksiak	Canada	1:57.25	Q
7	7	7	Barbora Seemanová	Czech Republic	1:57.32	Q, NR
8	6	6	Li Bingjie	China	1:57.59	Q
9	6	1	Freya Anderson	Great Britain	1:57.68	Q
10	7	6	Veronika Andrusenko	Russia	1:57.77	Q
11	5	1	Valeriya Salamatina	Russia	1:57.98	Q
12	6	2	Rio Shirai	Japan	1:58.10	Q
13	6	5	Charlotte Bonnet	France	1:58.21	Q
14	6	3	Allison Schmitt	United States	1:58.73	Q
15	6	8	Valentine Dumont	Belgium	1:59.11	Q
16	6	7	Chihiro Igarashi	Japan	1:59.18	Q
17	5	2	Katinka Hosszú	Hungary	1:59.44	
18	7	1	Holly Hibbott	Great Britain	1:59.60	
19	6	0	Erika Fairweather	New Zealand	1:59.68	
20	7	8	Elisbet Gámez	Cuba	2:00.33	
21	5	0	Aleksandra Polańska	Poland	2:00.34	
22	5	8	Katja Fain	Slovenia	2:00.38	
23	4	4	Quah Ting Wen	Singapore	2:00.39	
24	4	3	Marlene Kahler	Austria	2:00.56	
25	7	0	Maria Ugolkova	Switzerland	2:00.74	
26	4	2	Julia Hassler	Liechtenstein	2:00.99	NR
27	4	6	Natthanan Junkrajang	Thailand	2:01.86	
28	4	1	Monique Olivier	Luxembourg	2:01.96	
29	4	9	Ieva Maļuka	Latvia	2:02.38	NR
30	7	9	Rebecca Meder	South Africa	2:02.70	
31	5	7	Joanna Evans	Bahamas	2:02.76	
32	5	9	Jo Hyun-ju	South Korea	2:03.16	
33	4	7	Aleksa Gold	Estonia	2:03.30	
34	6	9	Nicole Oliva	Philippines	2:04.26	
35	4	0	María Álvarez	Colombia	2:05.28	
36	3	5	Gabriela Santis	Guatemala	2:05.36	
37	4	5	Emily Gantriis	Denmark	2:05.44	
38	3	3	Elan Daley	Bermuda	2:05.47	
39	3	6	Amanda Alfaro	Costa Rica	2:06.60	
40	3	4	Sara Pastrana	Honduras	2:06.76	
41	4	8	Snæfríður Jórunnardóttir	Iceland	2:07.43	
42	3	1	Gabriella Doueihy	Lebanon	2:09.07	
43	1	3	Ani Poghosyan	Armenia	2:09.09	
44	3	9	Tiana Rabarijaona	Madagascar	2:10.21	
45	3	2	Paige van der Westhuizen	Zimbabwe	2:11.36	
46	3	8	Danielle Treasure	Barbados	2:11.51	
47	3	0	Nicole Frank	Uruguay	2:11.56	
48	2	4	Gaurika Singh	Nepal	2:13.00	
49	1	6	Leedia Al-Safadi	Jordan	2:13.19	
50	2	5	Anđela Antunović	Montenegro	2:13.62	
51	2	2	Abiola Ogunbanwo	Nigeria	2:15.44	NR
52	2	3	Natalia Kuipers	Virgin Islands	2:15.45	
53	3	7	Elizaveta Rogozhnikova	Kyrgyzstan	2:15.46	
54	2	8	Mya de Freitas	Saint Vincent and the Grenadines	2:15.48	
55	2	7	Tinatin Kevlishvili	Georgia	2:17.71	
56	2	1	Zaira Forson	Ghana	2:18.74	
57	2	6	Olivia Fuller	Antigua and Barbuda	2:19.71	
58	2	0	Mineri Gomez	Guam	2:23.73	
59	2	9	Judith Meauri	Papua New Guinea	2:25.42	
60	1	5	Jin Ju Thompson	Northern Mariana Islands	2:32.35	
61	1	4	Charissa Panuve	Tonga	2:33.31	
	5	4	Emma McKeon	Australia	DNS	
	6	4	Taylor Ruck	Canada	DNS	
	7	5	Katie Ledecky	United States	DNS	

=== Semifinals ===
The semifinals were held on 23 July at 21:14.

==== Semifinal 1 ====
Rank	Lane	Name	Nationality	Time	Notes
1	4	Siobhán Haughey	Hong Kong	1:55.58	Q, NR
2	1	Yang Junxuan	China	1:55.99	Q, WJ
3	3	Penny Oleksiak	Canada	1:56.41	Q
4	7	Rio Shirai	Japan	1:56.82	Q
5	6	Li Bingjie	China	1:57.30	
6	2	Veronika Andrusenko	Russia	1:57.65	
7	5	Allison Schmitt	United States	1:58.27	
8	8	Chihiro Igarashi	Japan	1:58.97	

==== Semifinal 2 ====
Rank	Lane	Name	Nationality	Time	Notes
1	3	Federica Pellegrini	Italy	1:55.14	Q
2	5	Ariarne Titmus	Australia	1:55.36	Q
3	4	Sarah Sjöström	Sweden	1:55.70	Q
4	1	Charlotte Bonnet	France	1:56.19	Q
5	6	Barbora Seemanová	Czech Republic	1:57.16	NR
6	7	Valeriya Salamatina	Russia	1:57.25	
7	2	Freya Anderson	Great Britain	1:57.51	
8	8	Valentine Dumont	Belgium	1:58.78	

=== Final ===
The final was held on 24 July at 20:17.

Rank	Lane	Name	Nationality	Time	Notes
1st place, gold medalist(s)	4	Federica Pellegrini	Italy	1:54.22	
2nd place, silver medalist(s)	5	Ariarne Titmus	Australia	1:54.66	
3rd place, bronze medalist(s)	6	Sarah Sjöström	Sweden	1:54.78	
4	3	Siobhán Haughey	Hong Kong	1:54.98	NR
5	2	Yang Junxuan	China	1:55.43	
6	1	Penny Oleksiak	Canada	1:56.59	
7	7	Charlotte Bonnet	France	1:56.95	
8	8	Rio Shirai	Japan	1:57.14	
