= Hong Kong at the 2017 World Aquatics Championships =

- Flag of Hong Kong
- World Aquatics code: HKG
- National federation: Hong Kong Amateur Swimming Association
- Website: www.hkasa.org.hk

in Budapest, Hungary
- Competitors: 13 in 3 sports
- Medals: Gold 0 Silver 0 Bronze 0 Total 0

World Aquatics Championships appearances
- 1973; 1975; 1978; 1982; 1986; 1991; 1994; 1998; 2001; 2003; 2005; 2007; 2009; 2011; 2013; 2015; 2017; 2019; 2022; 2023; 2024; 2025

Hong Kong is scheduled to compete at the 2017 World Aquatics Championships in Budapest, Hungary from 14 July to 30 July.

== Open water swimming ==
Hong Kong has entered four open water swimmers

| Athlete | Event | Time | Rank |
|---|---|---|---|
| Keith Sin | Men's 5 km | 59:15.9 | 50 |
| Keith Sin | Men's 10 km | 2:04:38.10 | 55 |
| Tse Tsz Fung | Men's 5 km | 1:05:59.0 | 60 |
| Tse Tsz Fung | Men's 10 km | 2:09:32.40 | 61 |
| Lok Hoi Man | Women's 5 km | 1:07:05.2 | 48 |
| Lok Hoi Man | Women's 10 km | 2:19:19.3 | 55 |
| Nip Tsz Yin | Women's 5 km | 1:09:02.5 | 52 |
| Nip Tsz Yin | Women's 10 km | 2:26:49.9 | 57 |
| Lok Hoi Man; Nip Tsz Yin; Keith Sin; Tse Tsz Fung | Mixed team | 1:02:11.7 | 19 |

== Swimming ==
Hong Kong swimmers have achieved qualifying standards in the following events (up to a maximum of 2 swimmers in each event at the A-standard entry time, and 1 at the B-standard):

Men

| Athlete | Event | Heat | | Semifinal | | Final | |
| Athlete | Event | Time | Rank | Time | Rank | Time | Rank |
|---|---|---|---|---|---|---|---|
| Kent Cheung | 100 m freestyle | 51.49 | 64 | did not advance | | | |
| Kent Cheung | 200 m freestyle | 1:54.58 | 58 | did not advance | | | |

Women

| Athlete | Event | Heat | | Semifinal | | Final | |
| Athlete | Event | Time | Rank | Time | Rank | Time | Rank |
|---|---|---|---|---|---|---|---|
| Chan Kin Lok | 50 m butterfly | 27.47 | 36 | did not advance | | | |
| Chan Kin Lok | 100 m butterfly | 1:00.52 | 29 | did not advance | | | |
| Siobhán Haughey | 100 m freestyle | 54.45 | 15 Q | 54.05 | 14 | did not advance | |
| Siobhán Haughey | 200 m freestyle | 1:56.62 NR | 5 Q | 1:56.21 NR | 6 Q | 1:55.96 NR | 5 |
| Ho Nam Wai | 800 m freestyle | 9:03.38 | 31 | —N/a | | did not advance | |
| Ho Nam Wai | 1500 m freestyle | 17:17.64 | 20 | —N/a | | did not advance | |
| Claudia Lau | 100 m backstroke | 1:02.23 | 31 | did not advance | | | |
| Claudia Lau | 200 m backstroke | 2:11.67 | 16 Q | 2:14.82 | 16 | did not advance | |
| Sze Hang Yu | 50 m freestyle | 26.21 | 40 | did not advance | | | |
| Sze Hang Yu | 400 m freestyle | 4:20.57 | 26 | —N/a | | did not advance | |
| Toto Wong | 50 m backstroke | 29.27 | 37 | did not advance | | | |
| Toto Wong | 200 m individual medley | 2:27.68 | 34 | did not advance | | | |
| Siobhán Haughey; Ho Nam Wai; Claudia Lau; Sze Hang Yu | 4 × 100 m freestyle relay | 3:44.39 | 12 | —N/a | | did not advance | |
| Chan Kin Lok; Siobhán Haughey; Claudia Lau; Sze Hang Yu | 4 × 100 m medley relay | 4:07.40 | 13 | —N/a | | did not advance | |

== Synchronized swimming ==
Hong Kong's synchronized swimming team consisted of 2 athletes (2 female).

Women

| Athlete | Event | Preliminaries | | Final | |
| Athlete | Event | Points | Rank | Points | Rank |
|---|---|---|---|---|---|
| Kawazoe Haruka; Poon Christie Chi Kiu | Duet technical routine | 63.7011 | 39 | did not advance | |
| Kawazoe Haruka; Poon Christie Chi Kiu | Duet free routine | 65.7333 | 41 | did not advance | |
