= 2018 FINA World Swimming Championships (25 m) – Women's 4 × 100 metre freestyle relay =

Women's 4 × 100 metre freestyle relay at the 2018 FINA World Swimming Championships (25 m)
- Venue: Hangzhou Olympic Sports Center
- Dates: 11 December (heats and final)
- Nations: 11
- Teams: 11
- Winning time: 3:27.78

Medalists
gold medal	Olivia Smoliga; Lia Neal; Mallory Comerford; Kelsi Dahlia; Veronica Burchill; Erika Brown	United States
silver medal	Kim Busch; Femke Heemskerk; Maaike de Waard; Ranomi Kromowidjojo; Valerie van Roon	Netherlands
bronze medal	Zhu Menghui; Yang Junxuan; Liu Xiaohan; Wang Jingzhuo	China

The Women's 4 × 100 metre freestyle relay competition of the 2018 FINA World Swimming Championships (25 m) was held on 11 December 2018 at the Hangzhou Olympic Sports Center.

== Records ==
Prior to the competition, the existing world and championship records were as follows.

	Nation	Time	Location	Date
World record Championship record	Netherlands	3:26.53	Doha	5 December 2014

== Results ==
=== Heats ===
The heats were started on 11 December at 12:27.

Rank	Heat	Lane	Nation	Swimmers	Time	Notes
1	1	4	United States	Lia Neal (52.81); Veronica Burchill (52.81); Erika Brown (52.65); Kelsi Dahlia (51.25)	3:29.52	Q
2	1	5	Netherlands	Kim Busch (53.25); Maaike de Waard (53.35); Valerie van Roon (53.61); Ranomi Kromowidjojo (52.46)	3:32.67	Q
3	2	5	Russia	Maria Kameneva (52.98); Daria Kartashova (54.10); Daria Mullakaeva (52.98); Valeriya Salamatina (53.27)	3:33.33	Q
4	2	4	China	Wang Jingzhuo (54.43); Yang Junxuan (52.63); Liu Xiaohan (53.54); Zhu Menghui (52.82)	3:33.42	Q
5	2	3	Japan	Runa Imai (54.26); Aya Sato (53.00); Tomomi Aoki (53.46); Chihiro Igarashi (53.27)	3:33.99	Q
6	2	2	Germany	Annika Bruhn (53.81); Reva Foos (53.91); Jessica Steiger (53.50); Marie Pietruschka (53.09)	3:34.31	Q
7	1	3	Hong Kong	Ho Nam Wai (56.21); Stephanie Au (55.21); Chan Kin Lok (55.43); Sze Hang Yu (54.23)	3:41.08	Q
8	2	6	Turkey	Selen Özbilen (54.71); Roza Erdemli (56.75); Viktoriya Zeynep Güneş (56.22); Ekaterina Avramova (54.18)	3:41.86	Q
9	2	7	New Zealand	Rebecca Moynihan (55.37); Paige Flynn (54.45); Vanessa Ouwehand (57.69); Emma Godwin (55.18)	3:42.69	
10	1	6	Slovakia	Barbora Mikuskova (56.28); Tamara Potocká (55.74); Sabína Kupčová (55.98); Laura Benková (55.74)	3:43.74	
11	1	2	Chinese Taipei	Chen Szu-an (57.04); Huang Mei-chien (58.05); Wang Wan-chen (57.69); Lin Pei-wun (57.67)	3:50.45	

=== Final ===
The final was held at 20:43.

Rank	Lane	Nation	Swimmers	Time	Notes
1st place, gold medalist(s)	4	United States	Olivia Smoliga (52.71); Lia Neal (52.58); Mallory Comerford (51.09); Kelsi Dahlia (51.40)	3:27.78	
2nd place, silver medalist(s)	5	Netherlands	Kim Busch (53.19); Femke Heemskerk (50.93); Maaike de Waard (53.13); Ranomi Kromowidjojo (50.77)	3:28.02	
3rd place, bronze medalist(s)	6	China	Zhu Menghui (52.58); Yang Junxuan (52.28); Liu Xiaohan (53.26); Wang Jingzhuo (52.80)	3:30.92	
4	2	Japan	Tomomi Aoki (53.33); Aya Sato (52.60); Runa Imai (53.12); Chihiro Igarashi (52.63)	3:31.68	
5	3	Russia	Maria Kameneva (53.01); Daria Mullakaeva (53.20); Valeriya Salamatina (52.82); Veronika Andrusenko (53.46)	3:32.48	
6	7	Germany	Annika Bruhn (53.77); Reva Foos (53.32); Jessica Steiger (53.03); Marie Pietruschka (53.15)	3:32.27	
7	1	Hong Kong	Ho Nam Wai (55.91); Stephanie Au (54.72); Chan Kin Lok (55.33); Sze Hang Yu (54.29)	3:40.25	
8	8	Turkey	Selen Özbilen (54.68); Roza Erdemli (56.37); Viktoriya Zeynep Güneş (56.25); Ekaterina Avramova (53.95)	3:41.25	
