= Swimming at the 2014 Asian Games – Women's 4 × 100 metre medley relay =

Women's 4 × 100 metre medley relay at the 2014 Asian Games
- Venue: Munhak Park Tae-hwan Aquatics Center
- Date: 25 September 2014
- Competitors: 46 from 10 nations

Medalists
gold medal	Japan; Shiho Sakai, Kanako Watanabe, Natsumi Hoshi, Miki Uchida, Miyu Nakano
silver medal	South Korea; Lee Da-lin, Yang Ji-won, An Se-hyeon, Ko Mi-so
bronze medal	Hong Kong; Stephanie Au, Yvette Kong, Sze Hang Yu, Siobhán Haughey, Claudia Lau, Jamie Yeung, Chan Kin Lok, Tam Hoi Lam

The women's 4 × 100 metre medley relay event at the 2014 Asian Games took place on 25 September 2014 at Munhak Park Tae-hwan Aquatics Center.

== Schedule ==
All times are Korea Standard Time (UTC+09:00)

Date	Time	Event
Thursday, 25 September 2014	09:00	Heats
Thursday, 25 September 2014	20:20	Final

== Records ==
Prior to this competition, the existing world, Asian and Games records were as follows.

World Record	United States	3:52.05	London, United Kingdom	4 August 2012
Asian Record	China	3:52.19	Rome, Italy	1 August 2009
Games Record	China	3:57.80	Guangzhou, China	13 November 2010

== Results ==
Legend

- DNS — Did not start
- DSQ — Disqualified

=== Heats ===
Rank	Heat	Team	Time	Notes
1	2	Japan (JPN)	4:06.54	
		Shiho Sakai	1:03.06	
		Kanako Watanabe	1:07.62	
		Miyu Nakano	1:00.50	
		Miki Uchida	55.36	
2	1	South Korea (KOR)	4:11.99	
		Lee Da-lin	1:03.13	
		Yang Ji-won	1:10.92	
		An Se-hyeon	1:00.76	
		Ko Mi-so	57.18	
3	1	Hong Kong (HKG)	4:19.35	
		Claudia Lau	1:04.61	
		Jamie Yeung	1:12.10	
		Chan Kin Lok	1:03.78	
		Tam Hoi Lam	58.86	
4	2	Singapore (SIN)	4:20.88	
		Tan Jing E	1:06.91	
		Samantha Yeo	1:12.65	
		Quah Ting Wen	1:01.37	
		Marina Chan	59.95	
5	1	Chinese Taipei (TPE)	4:25.30	
		Hsu An	1:04.91	
		Lin Pei-wun	1:13.58	
		Yang Chin-kuei	1:06.23	
		Yang Ming-hsuan	1:00.58	
6	1	Macau (MAC)	4:28.43	
		Erica Vong	1:06.01	
		Lei On Kei	1:14.54	
		Ma Cheok Mei	1:07.78	
		Tan Chi Yan	1:00.10	
7	2	Thailand (THA)	4:29.41	
		Natthanan Junkrajang	1:04.82	
		Phiangkhwan Pawapotako	1:13.77	
		Patarawadee Kittiya	1:05.55	
		Sutasinee Pankaew	1:05.27	
8	2	Mongolia (MGL)	5:14.32	
		Bayaryn Yesüi	1:19.15	
		Saintöriin Nomun	1:28.56	
		Tsogtgereliin Möngönsor	1:13.07	
		Enkhmandakhyn Nandinzayaa	1:13.54	
—	2	China (CHN)	DSQ	
		Wang Xueer	1:02.19	
		He Yun	1:08.67	
		Lu Ying		
		Tang Yi		
—	1	Pakistan (PAK)	DNS	
		—		
		—		
		—		
		—		

=== Final ===
Rank	Team	Time	Notes
1st place, gold medalist(s)	Japan (JPN)	4:00.94	
	Shiho Sakai	1:01.70	
	Kanako Watanabe	1:06.79	
	Natsumi Hoshi	58.80	
	Miki Uchida	53.65	
2nd place, silver medalist(s)	South Korea (KOR)	4:04.82	
	Lee Da-lin	1:02.64	
	Yang Ji-won	1:08.93	
	An Se-hyeon	57.79	
	Ko Mi-so	55.46	
3rd place, bronze medalist(s)	Hong Kong (HKG)	4:07.15	
	Stephanie Au	1:01.96	
	Yvette Kong	1:10.69	
	Sze Hang Yu	1:00.08	
	Siobhán Haughey	54.42	
4	Singapore (SIN)	4:11.77	
	Tao Li	1:03.42	
	Samantha Yeo	1:11.93	
	Quah Ting Wen	1:00.31	
	Amanda Lim	56.11	
5	Thailand (THA)	4:16.66	
	Natthanan Junkrajang	1:05.57	
	Phiangkhwan Pawapotako	1:12.11	
	Sarisa Suwannachet	1:00.90	
	Benjaporn Sriphanomthorn	58.08	
6	Chinese Taipei (TPE)	4:19.92	
	Hsu An	1:04.36	
	Lin Pei-wun	1:12.58	
	Yu Yi-chen	1:04.56	
	Yang Chin-kuei	58.42	
7	Macau (MAC)	4:26.18	
	Erica Vong	1:05.36	
	Lei On Kei	1:14.78	
	Ma Cheok Mei	1:07.58	
	Tan Chi Yan	58.46	
8	Mongolia (MGL)	5:07.23	
	Bayaryn Yesüi	1:18.96	
	Saintöriin Nomun	1:26.03	
	Tsogtgereliin Möngönsor	1:10.17	
	Enkhmandakhyn Nandinzayaa	1:12.07	
