= Swimming at the 2024 World Aquatics Championships – Mixed 4 × 100 metre freestyle relay =

Mixed 4 × 100 metre freestyle relay at the Swimming at the 2024 World Aquatics Championships
- Venue: Aspire Dome
- Location: Doha, Qatar
- Dates: 17 February (heats and final)
- Competitors: 92 from 20 nations
- Teams: 20
- Winning time: 3:21.18

Medalists
gold medal	Pan Zhanle; Wang Haoyu; Li Bingjie; Yu Yiting; Ji Xinjie; Ai Yanhan	China
silver medal	Kai Taylor; Jack Cartwright; Shayna Jack; Brianna Throssell; Alexandria Perkins; Abbey Harkin	Australia
bronze medal	Hunter Armstrong; Matt King; Claire Curzan; Kate Douglass; Luke Hobson; Jack Aikins; Addison Sauickie; Kayla Han	United States

The Mixed 4 × 100 metre freestyle relay competition at the 2024 World Aquatics Championships was held on 17 February 2024.

== Records ==
Prior to the competition, the existing world and championship records were as follows.

World record	Australia	3:18.83	Fukuoka, Japan	29 July 2023
Competition record	Australia	3:18.83	Fukuoka, Japan	29 July 2023

== Results ==
=== Heats ===
The heats were started at 10:19.

Rank	Heat	Lane	Nation	Swimmers	Time	Notes
1	3	3	China	Wang Haoyu (48.28); Ji Xinjie (47.86); Yu Yiting (53.90); Ai Yanhan (54.43)	3:24.47	Q, AS
2	3	5	Canada	Finlay Knox (48.93); Javier Acevedo (47.98); Rebecca Smith (54.45); Taylor Ruck (53.42)	3:24.78	Q
3	3	4	Australia	Kai Taylor (48.73); Jack Cartwright (48.03); Alexandria Perkins (54.58); Abbey Harkin (53.96)	3:25.30	Q
4	2	5	Italy	Lorenzo Zazzeri (48.51); Manuel Frigo (48.62); Sofia Morini (54.66); Chiara Tarantino (54.27)	3:26.06	Q
5	2	4	United States	Luke Hobson (48.50); Jack Aikins (48.92); Addison Sauickie (54.83); Kayla Han (56.51)	3:28.76	Q
6	3	6	Netherlands	Stan Pijnenburg (49.08); Thom de Boer (49.43); Milou van Wijk (55.48); Janna van Kooten (55.24)	3:29.23	Q
7	2	2	Slovakia	Matej Duša (49.23); Tibor Tistan (50.64); Lillian Slušná (55.92); Teresa Ivan (55.88)	3:31.67	Q
8	3	7	Hong Kong	Lau Shiu Yue (52.30); Ian Ho (48.80); Camille Cheng (55.29); Tam Hoi Lam (55.80)	3:32.19	Q, NR
9	1	6	Philippines	Jarod Hatch (51.65); Kayla Sanchez (55.08); Teia Salvino (57.21); Jerard Jacinto (52.59)	3:36.53	
10	2	7	Thailand	Dulyawat Kaewsriyong (50.28); Tonnam Kanteemool (50.88); Kamonchanok Kwanmuang (58.42); Jenjira Srisa-Ard (1:00.27)	3:39.85	
11	3	8	Uganda	Jesse Ssuubi Ssengonzi (52.07); Tendo Mukalazi (51.66); Kirabo Namutebi (1:00.28); Gloria Anna Muzito (56.34)	3:40.35	
12	1	4	Kenya	Monyo Maina (52.94); Ridhwan Mohamed (52.67); Imara Thorpe (59.28); Maria Brunlehner (57.39)	3:42.28	NR
13	2	1	Armenia	Artur Barseghyan (50.41); Ashot Chakhoyan (54.78); Varsenik Manucharyan (1:00.30); Ani Poghosyan (58.80)	3:44.29	
14	1	5	Dominican Republic	Anthony Piñeiro (52.72); María Alejandra Fernández (1:01.81); Alejandra Santana (1:02.82); Javier Núñez (50.82)	3:48.17	
15	3	1	Bahamas	Lamar Taylor (53.19); Marvin Johnson (53.81); Victoria Russell (1:02.01); Rhanishka Gibbs (1:00.62)	3:49.63	
16	2	8	Guam	Israel Poppe (54.12); James Hendrix (53.87); Amaya Bollinger (1:03.04); Mia Lee (1:01.26)	3:52.29	NR
17	1	3	Tonga	Carolann Faeamani (1:04.46); Alan Uhi (55.76); Charissa Panuve (1:03.76); Finau Ohuafi (53.92)	3:57.90	
18	3	0	Bahrain	Saud Ghali (55.27); Ahmed Theibich (56.98); Amani Al-Obaidli (1:01.65); Noor Yussuf Abdulla (1:04.01)	3:57.91	
19	2	0	Micronesia	Tasi Limtiaco (55.01); Kestra Kihleng (1:05.27); Katerson Moya (57.81); Taeyanna Adams (1:07.22)	4:05.31	
20	2	9	Maldives	Mubal Azzam Ibrahim (57.69); Aishath Shaig (1:10.06); Hamna Ahmed (1:09.50); Mohamed Rihan Shiham (56.92)	4:14.17	
	2	3	Sweden	Did not start		
	2	6	Hungary	Did not start		
	3	2	South Africa	Did not start		

=== Final ===
The final was held on 17 February at 20:45.

Rank	Lane	Nation	Swimmers	Time	Notes
1st place, gold medalist(s)	4	China	Pan Zhanle (47.29); Wang Haoyu (47.41); Li Bingjie (53.11); Yu Yiting (53.37)	3:21.18	AS
2nd place, silver medalist(s)	3	Australia	Kai Taylor (48.01); Jack Cartwright (47.90); Shayna Jack (52.38); Brianna Throssell (53.49)	3:21.78	
3rd place, bronze medalist(s)	2	United States	Hunter Armstrong (47.83); Matt King (47.78); Claire Curzan (53.82); Kate Douglass (52.85)	3:22.28	
4	5	Canada	Finlay Knox (48.79); Javier Acevedo (47.58); Taylor Ruck (53.28); Rebecca Smith (54.14)	3:23.79	
5	6	Italy	Alessandro Miressi (48.06); Manuel Frigo (48.06); Sofia Morini (54.23); Chiara Tarantino (54.05)	3:24.40	
6	7	Netherlands	Stan Pijnenburg (48.84); Caspar Corbeau (49.05); Kira Toussaint (54.51); Marrit Steenbergen (52.74)	3:25.14	
7	8	Slovakia	Matej Duša (49.37); Tibor Tistan (50.32); Lillian Slušná (55.17); Teresa Ivan (55.02)	3:29.88	NR
8	1	Hong Kong	Lau Shiu Yue (52.24); Ian Ho (48.66); Camille Cheng (54.71); Tam Hoi Lam (55.52)	3:31.13	NR
