= List of Hong Kong records in swimming =

This is a list of the swimming records for Hong Kong. These are the fastest times ever swum by a swimmer representing Hong Kong, for both long course (50m) and short course (25m) pools.

These records are kept by the Hong Kong national swimming federation: Hong Kong Amateur Swimming Association (HKASA).

All records were achieved in finals unless otherwise specified.

== Long course (50 m) ==
=== Men ===
Event	Time		Name	Club	Date	Meet	Location	Ref
50 m freestyle	21.71		Ian Ho	Hong Kong	16 November 2025	National Games	Shenzhen, China	
100 m freestyle	49.15		Cheuk Ming Ho	CPS	30 May 2021	Division I Part 2 Competition	Hong Kong, Hong Kong	
200 m freestyle	1:47.46		Cheuk Ming Ho	CPS	27 June 2021	Division I Part 3 Competition	Hong Kong, Hong Kong	
400 m freestyle	3:50.53		Cheuk Ming Ho	CPS	18 April 2021	Festival of Sport LC Time Trial	Hong Kong, Hong Kong	
800 m freestyle	8:03.41		Cheuk Ming Ho	CPS	21 March 2021	Hong Kong Olympic Time Trial	Hong Kong, Hong Kong	
1500 m freestyle	15:38.76		Cheuk Ming Ho	Hong Kong	24 August 2018	Asian Games	Jakarta, Indonesia	
1500 m freestyle	15:38.41	#	Eric Chen	Irvine Novaquatics	3 August 2026	US Junior Championships	Irvine, United States	
50m backstroke	26.00		Lau Shie Yue	HTA	27 June 2021	Division I Part 3 Competition	Hong Kong, Hong Kong	
50m backstroke	25.91	#	Yu Dongqi	HTA	12 April 2026	Festival of Sport – LC Time Trial	Hong Kong, Hong Kong	
100m backstroke	55.51	h	Hayden Kwan	Hong Kong	18 July 2025	World University Games	Berlin, Germany	
100m backstroke	55.11	#	Hayden Kwan	Hong Kong	20 September 2026	Asian Games	Tokyo, Japan	
200m backstroke	2:00.22	h	Hayden Kwan	United Swim Club	12 April 2024	TYR Pro Swim Series	San Antonio, United States	
50m breaststroke	27.64	h, so	Adam Mak	Hong Kong	21 July 2025	World University Games	Berlin, Germany	
50m breaststroke	27.61	#	Nicholas Cheung	Hong Kong	19 July 2026	Division I Part 2 Competition	Hong Kong, Hong Kong	
50m breaststroke	27.61	h, #	Nicholas Cheung	WTS	9 August 2026	Hong Kong Open Championships	Hong Kong, Hong Kong	
100m breaststroke	1:00.37		Nicholas Cheung	Hong Kong	5 February 2026	Malaysia Invitational Age Group Championships	Kuala Lumpur, Malaysia	
100m breaststroke	1:00.14	#	Adam Mak	Hong Kong	17 June 2026	Chinese Championships	Hangzhou, China	
100m breaststroke	59.96	#	Nicholas Cheung	WTS	9 August 2026	Hong Kong Open Championships	Hong Kong, Hong Kong	
200m breaststroke	2:09.93		Adam Mak	Hong Kong	15 November 2025	National Games	Shenzhen, China	
200m breaststroke	2:08.77	#	Adam Mak	Hong Kong	24 September 2026	Asian Games	Tokyo, Japan	
50m butterfly	23.97		Ng Cheuk Yin	TPS	2 November 2019	Hong Kong Age Group Championships	Sha Tin, Hong Kong	
50m butterfly	23.97	swim off, ratified by FINA but not HKASA	Geoffrey Cheah	Wolverine	16 May 2015	Arena Pro Swim Series	Charlotte, United States	
100m butterfly	53.36		Ian Ho	SCA	1 November 2025	Hong Kong Age Group Championships	Hong Kong, Hong Kong	
100m butterfly	52.78	h, #	Ian Ho	Hong Kong	20 September 2026	Asian Games	Tokyo, Japan	
100m butterfly	53.33	ratified by FINA but not HKASA	Geoffrey Cheah	Wolverine	12 February 2015	Arena Pro Swim Series	Orlando, United States	
200m butterfly	2:00.43		Nicholas Lim	LRC	13 April 2019	Festival of Sport – LC Time Trial	Hong Kong, Hong Kong	
200m individual medley	2:01.37	sf	Kenneth To	Hong Kong	21 August 2017	Universiade	Taipei, Taiwan	
400m individual medley	4:26.54		Peter Whittington	Hong Kong	8 April 2023	Thailand Age Group Championships	Samutprakan, Thailand	
400m individual medley	4:23.70	#	Wang Yi Shun	CPS	11 April 2026	Festival of Sport – LC Time Trial	Hong Kong, Hong Kong	
4 × 100 m freestyle relay	3:21.22		Lum Ching Tat (50.88); Derick Ng Chun Nam (49.82); Kent Cheung (50.95); David Wong Kai Wai (49.57)	Hong Kong	8 December 2009	East Asian Games	Hong Kong	
4 × 200 m freestyle relay	7:27.16		Kent Cheung (1:52.46); Derick Ng Chun Nam (1:51.24); Lum Ching Tat (1:51.38); David Wong Kai Wai (1:52.08)	Hong Kong	6 December 2009	East Asian Games	Hong Kong	
4 × 100 m medley relay	3:41.71	h	Hayden Kwan (55.81); Nicholas Cheung (1:00.85); Ng Cheuk Yin (54.42); Ho Siu Lun (50.63)	Hong Kong	23 July 2025	World University Games	Berlin, Germany	

Legend: # – Record awaiting ratification by HKASA; WR – World record; AS – Asian record; e – equalled existing record;
Records not set in finals: h – heat; sf – semifinal; r – relay 1st leg; rh – relay heat 1st leg; b – B final; † – en route to final mark; so – swim-off; tt – time trial

=== Women ===
Event	Time		Name	Club	Date	Meet	Location	Ref
50m freestyle	24.30		Siobhán Haughey	Hong Kong	20 October 2023	World Cup	Budapest, Hungary	
100m freestyle	52.02	AS	Siobhán Haughey	Hong Kong	8 October 2023	World Cup	Berlin, Germany	
200m freestyle	1:53.92	AS	Siobhán Haughey	Hong Kong	28 July 2021	Olympic Games	Tokyo, Japan	
400m freestyle	4:05.30		Siobhán Haughey	Hong Kong	6 October 2023	World Cup	Berlin, Germany	
800m freestyle	8:39.93		Siobhán Haughey	SCA	11 May 2024	Olympic HKG Swimming Inv Trial I	Hong Kong, Hong Kong	
1500m freestyle	16:51.05		Ho Nam Wai	Hong Kong	15 June 2019	Mare Nostrum	Barcelona, Spain	
50m backstroke	27.98		Stephanie Au	Hong Kong	8 June 2019	Mare Nostrum	Monte Carlo, Monaco	
100m backstroke	1:00.22		Stephanie Au	Hong Kong	16 August 2019	World Cup	Singapore, Singapore	
200m backstroke	2:09.33		Claudia Lau	DLS	2 July 2016	Division I Part 3 Competition	Hong Kong, Hong Kong	
50m breaststroke	30.36	=	Siobhán Haughey	Hong Kong	24 September 2023	Asian Games	Hangzhou, China	
50m breaststroke	30.36	=	Siobhán Haughey	Hong Kong	15 October 2023	World Cup	Athens, Greece	
100m breaststroke	1:05.92		Siobhán Haughey	Hong Kong	13 February 2024	World Championships	Doha, Qatar	
200m breaststroke	2:27.96		Yvette Kong	University of Edinburgh	12 March 2016	Edinburgh International	Edinburgh, Great Britain	
50m butterfly	26.55		Tam Hoi Lam	CUC	16 April 2023	Festival of Sport Time Trial	Hong Kong, Hong Kong	
50m butterfly	26.11	#	Natalie Kan	Hong Kong	25 September 2026	Asian Games	Tokyo, Japan	
100m butterfly	58.12		Siobhán Haughey	SCA	15 April 2023	Festival of Sport Time Trial	Hong Kong, Hong Kong	
100m butterfly	58.05	#	Natalie Kan	Hong Kong	23 September 2026	Asian Games	Tokyo, Japan	
200m butterfly	2:10.63		Yeung Hoi Ching	TPS	14 July 2024	Hong Kong Open Championships	Hong Kong, Hong Kong	
200m individual medley	2:12.10		Siobhán Haughey	Hong Kong	4 June 2017	Arena Pro Swim Series	Santa Clara, United States	
400m individual medley	4:48.58		Chloe Cheng	PSC	26 June 2021	Division I Part 3 Competition	Hong Kong, Hong Kong	
4 × 100 m freestyle relay	3:39.10		Camille Cheng (56.11); Siobhán Haughey (51.92); Tam Hoi Lam (55.66); Stephanie Au (55.41)	Hong Kong	24 September 2023	Asian Games	Hangzhou, China	
4 × 100 m freestyle relay	3:36.59	#	Gilaine Ma (54.95); Siobhán Haughey (52.22); Li Sum Yiu (54.51); Natalie Kan (54.91)	Hong Kong	20 September 2026	Asian Games	Tokyo, Japan	
4 × 200 m freestyle relay	8:02.42		Chloe Cheng (2:03.19); Siobhán Haughey (1:54.21); Camille Cheng (2:02.46); Stephanie Au (2:02.56)	Hong Kong	28 September 2023	Asian Games	Hangzhou, China	
4 × 100 m medley relay	4:01.72		Stephanie Au (1:00.74); Siobhán Haughey (1:06.03); Natalie Kan (59.89); Tam Hoi Lam (55.06)	Hong Kong	29 September 2023	Asian Games	Hangzhou, China	

Legend: # – Record awaiting ratification by HKASA; WR – World record; AS – Asian record; e – equalled existing record;
Records not set in finals: h – heat; sf – semifinal; r – relay 1st leg; rh – relay heat 1st leg; b – B final; † – en route to final mark; so – swim-off; tt – time trial

=== Mixed relay ===
Event	Time	Name	Club	Date	Meet	Location	Ref
4 × 100 m freestyle relay	3:31.13	Lau Shiu Yue (52.24); Ian Ho (48.66); Camille Cheng (54.71); Tam Hoi Lam (55.52)	Hong Kong	17 February 2024	World Championships	Doha, Qatar	
4 × 100 m medley relay	3:50.22	Stephanie Au (1:00.52); Kenneth To (1:00.63); Nicholas Lim (53.75); Camille Cheng (55.32)	Hong Kong	22 August 2018	Asian Games	Jakarta, Indonesia	

Legend: # – Record awaiting ratification by HKASA; WR – World record; AS – Asian record; e – equalled existing record;
Records not set in finals: h – heat; so – swim-off

== Short course (25 m) ==
=== Men ===
Event	Time		Name	Club	Date	Meet	Location	Ref
50m freestyle	20.85	sf	Ian Ho	Hong Kong	14 December 2024	World Championships	Budapest, Hungary	
100m freestyle	47.15		Kenneth To	Hong Kong	14 November 2017	World Cup	Tokyo, Japan	
200m freestyle	1:45.36		Kenneth To	LWS	10 June 2017	Division I Part 1 Competition	Hongkong, Hong Kong	
200m freestyle	1:45.01	#	Lo Tsz Lam	Hong Kong	28 October 2026	Chinese Championships	Beijing, China	
400m freestyle	3:46.12		Cheuk Ming Ho	CPS	10 September 2023	Division I Part 2 Competition	Hong Kong, Hong Kong	
800m freestyle	7:57.33		So Kwun Wa	WDA	9 February 2025	Hong Kong Age Group Championships	Hong Kong, Hong Kong	
800m freestyle	7:56.05	#	Eric Chen	HIS	10 October 2026	Division I Part 3 Competition	Hong Kong, Hong Kong	
1500m freestyle	15:01.80		Cheuk Ming Ho	Hong Kong	16 November 2018	World Cup	Singapore, Singapore	
50m backstroke	23.68		Ng Cheuk Yin	TPS	17 July 2022	Division 1 Time Trial	Hong Kong	
100m backstroke	51.30	h	Ng Cheuk Yin	Hong Kong	13 December 2022	World Championships	Melbourne, Australia	
200m backstroke	1:52.48	h	Hayden Kwan	Hong Kong	15 December 2024	World Championships	Budapest, Hungary	
50m breaststroke	26.89		Kenneth To	LWS	11 March 2018	Hong Kong Age Group Championships	Hong Kong, Hong Kong	
50m breaststroke	26.64	not ratified, Hong Kong Best Time	Lam Chi Chong	-	28 December 2025	Division 1 (Part 2) Competition	Hong Kong, Hong Kong	
100m breaststroke	57.82		Kenneth To	LWS	10 March 2018	Hong Kong Age Group Championships	Hong Kong, Hong Kong	
200m breaststroke	2:04.83		Adam Mak	Hong Kong	20 October 2024	World Cup	Shanghai, China	
200m breaststroke	2:04.55	#	Hong Kong	10 October 2026	World Cup	Tashkent, Uzbekistan		
200m breaststroke	2:03.96	#	Adam Mak	Hong Kong	26 October 2026	Chinese Championships	Beijing, China	
50m butterfly	22.90	h	Kenneth To	Hong Kong	11 November 2017	World Cup	Beijing, China	
100m butterfly	51.45		Ng Cheuk Yin	TPS	17 July 2022	Division 1 Time Trial	Hong Kong	
200m butterfly	1:57.18		Nicholas Lim	LRC	3 June 2018	Division I Age Group Championships	Hong Kong, Hong Kong	
100m individual medley	51.88		Kenneth To	Hong Kong	14 December 2018	World Championships	Hangzhou, China	
200m individual medley	1:54.83		Kenneth To	Hong Kong	1 October 2017	World Cup	Hongkong, Hong Kong	
400m individual medley	4:15.24		Peter Whittington	DLS	27 May 2023	Hong Kong Age Group Championships	Hong Kong, Hong Kong	
400m individual medley	4:13.25	#	Lo Tsz Lam	WTS	25 January 2026	Division I Part 3 Competition	Hong Kong, Hong Kong	
4 × 50 m freestyle relay	1:27.59	h	Cheuk Ming Ho (22.93); Ian Ho (20.95); Ng Cheuk Yin (21.36); Hayden Kwan (22.35)	Hong Kong	15 December 2022	World Championships	Melbourne, Australia	
4 × 100 m freestyle relay	3:14.67	h	Cheuk Ming Ho (48.71); Ian Ho (47.95); Ng Yan Kin (50.17); Ng Cheuk Yin (47.84)	Hong Kong	13 December 2022	World Championships	Melbourne, Australia	
4 × 200 m freestyle relay	7:16.07		Lo Tsz Lam; Li Sing Hoi; Lai King Wo; Lau Chor Tik	Win Tin	28 December 2025	Division I Age Group Championships	Hong Kong, Hong Kong	
4 × 50 m medley relay	1:34.74	h	Hayden Kwan (24.38); Ng Yan Kin (27.43); Ng Cheuk Yin (22.59); Ian Ho (20.34)	Hong Kong	17 December 2022	World Championships	Melbourne, Australia	
4 × 100 m medley relay	3:30.73	h	Hayden Kwan (52.96); Adam Chillingworth (59.41); Ng Cheuk Yin (51.13); Ian Ho (47.23)	Hong Kong	18 December 2022	World Championships	Melbourne, Australia	

Legend: # – Record awaiting ratification by HKASA; WR – World record; AS – Asian record; e – equalled existing record;
Records not set in finals: h – heat; sf – semifinal; r – relay 1st leg; rh – relay heat 1st leg; b – B final; † – en route to final mark; so – swim-off; tt – time trial

=== Women ===
Event	Time		Name	Club	Date	Meet	Location	Ref
50 m freestyle	23.75	AS	Siobhán Haughey	Energy Standard	26 August 2021	International Swimming League	Naples, Italy	
50 m freestyle	23.48	AS, #	Siobhan Haughey	Hong Kong	1 October 2026	World Cup	Baku, Azerbaijan	
100 m freestyle	50.79	AS	Siobhán Haughey	Energy Standard	4 December 2021	International Swimming League	Eindhoven, Netherlands	
200 m freestyle	1:50.31	WR	Siobhán Haughey	Hong Kong	16 December 2021	World Championships	Abu Dhabi, United Arab Emirates	
400 m freestyle	3:56.52		Siobhán Haughey	Hong Kong	21 October 2022	World Cup	Berlin, Germany	
800 m freestyle	8:25.47		Stephanie Au	Hong Kong	22 November 2009	World Cup	Singapore	
1500 m freestyle	16:35.88		Stephanie Au	Dik Wing Association	22 February 2009	Hong Kong Division I Competition	Hong Kong	
50m backstroke	26.95		Stephanie Au	Hong Kong	30 September 2017	World Cup	Hong Kong, Hong Kong	
100m backstroke	58.27		Stephanie Au	Hong Kong	30 September 2014	World Cup	Hong Kong	
200m backstroke	2:06.54		Cheung Sum Yue	TPS	8 February 2025	Hong Kong Age Group Championships	Hong Kong, Hong Kong	
50m breaststroke	29.74		Siobhán Haughey	Hong Kong	20 October 2024	World Cup	Shanghai, China	
100m breaststroke	1:04.48		Siobhán Haughey	SCA	3 February 2024	Hong Kong Age Group Championships	Hong Kong, Hong Kong	
200m breaststroke	2:23.46		Siobhán Haughey	South China Athletic Association	23 February 2014	Age Group Swimming Competition – Division I	Hong Kong	
50m butterfly	25.98	h	Tam Hoi Lam	Hong Kong	10 December 2024	World Championships	Budapest, Hungary	
100m butterfly	57.98		Chan Kin Lok	Hong Kong	4 October 2017	World Cup	Doha, Qatar	
200m butterfly	2:08.72		Chan Kin Lok	Hong Kong	5 October 2017	World Cup	Doha, Qatar	
200m butterfly	2:08.33	#	Yeung Hoi Ching	TPS	7 February 2026	Hong Kong Age Group Championships	Hong Kong, Hong Kong	
100m individual medley	59.45		Siobhán Haughey	South China Athletic Association	3 September 2022	Age Group SC Time Trial	Hong Kong, Hong Kong	
200m individual medley	2:08.03		Siobhán Haughey	South China Athletic Association	4 September 2022	Age Group SC Time Trial	Hong Kong, Hong Kong	
200m individual medley	2:07.65	not ratified	Siobhán Haughey	DC Trident	6 October 2019	International Swimming League	Indianapolis, United States	
400m individual medley	4:42.32		Siobhán Haughey	South China Athletic Association	23 February 2014	Hong Kong Division I Competition	Hong Kong	
400m individual medley	4:39.48	#	Wang Xin Tong	WTS	25 January 2026	Division I Part 3 Competition	Hong Kong, Hong Kong	
4 × 50 m freestyle relay	1:39.35		Tam Ho Lam (24.70); Stephanie Au (24.68); Chan Kin Lok (25.21); Sze Hang Yu (24.76)	Hong Kong	21 December 2021	World Championships	Abu Dhabi, United Arab Emirates	
4 × 100 m freestyle relay	3:39.67	h	Tam Hoi Lam (54.08); Gilaine Ma (54.97); Ng Lai Wa (57.06); Li Sum Yiu (53.56)	Hong Kong	10 December 2024	World Championships	Budapest, Hungary	
4 × 200 m freestyle relay	7:55.48	h	Tang Tsoi Lam Katii (1:58.31); Sze Hang Yu (1:58.41); Cheng Chloe (1:59.20); Stephanie Au (1:59.56)	Hong Kong	20 December 2021	World Championships	Abu Dhabi, United Arab Emirates	
4 × 50 m medley relay	1:48.79		Stephanie Au (27.11); Yvette Kong (30.74); Chan Kin Lok (26.53); Sze Hang Yu (24.41)	Hong Kong	22 September 2017	Asian Indoor and Martial Arts Games	Ashgabat, Turkmenistan	
4 × 100 m medley relay	3:58.32		Stephanie Au (58.32); Rainbow Ip (1:07.71); Chan Kin Lok (58.65); Sze Hang Yu (53.64)	Hong Kong	25 September 2017	Asian Indoor and Martial Arts Games	Ashgabat, Turkmenistan	

Legend: # – Record awaiting ratification by HKASA; WR – World record; AS – Asian record; e – equalled existing record;
Records not set in finals: h – heat; sf – semifinal; r – relay 1st leg; rh – relay heat 1st leg; b – B final; † – en route to final mark; so – swim-off; tt – time trial

=== Mixed relay ===
Event	Time		Name	Club	Date	Meet	Location	Ref
4 × 50 m freestyle relay	1:30.40		Ian Ho (21.08); Ralph Koo (21.80); Siobhán Haughey (23.52); Li Sum Yiu (24.00)	Hong Kong	13 December 2024	World Championships	Budapest, Hungary	
4 × 50 m medley relay	1:41.50	h	Hayden Kwan (24.00); Man Wui Kiu (31.25); Tam Hoi Lam (25.73); Ian Ho (20.52)	Hong Kong	11 December 2024	World Championships	Budapest, Hungary	
4 × 100 m medley relay	3:42.37	h	Hayden Kwan (52.14); Adam Mak (58.38); Yeung Hoi Ching (58.16); Li Sum Yiu (53.69)	Hong Kong	14 December 2024	World Championships	Budapest, Hungary	

Legend: # – Record awaiting ratification by HKASA; e – equalled existing record;
Records not set in finals: h – heat; so – swim-off
