= Swimming at the 2014 Asian Games – Women's 4 × 200 metre freestyle relay =

Women's 4 × 200 metre freestyle relay at the 2014 Asian Games
- Venue: Munhak Park Tae-hwan Aquatics Center
- Date: 23 September 2014
- Competitors: 32 from 8 nations

Medalists
gold medal	China; Guo Junjun, Tang Yi, Cao Yue, Shen Duo
silver medal	Japan; Chihiro Igarashi, Yasuko Miyamoto, Yayoi Matsumoto, Aya Takano
bronze medal	Hong Kong; Camille Cheng, Stephanie Au, Sze Hang Yu, Siobhán Haughey

The women's 4 × 200 metre freestyle relay event at the 2014 Asian Games took place on 23 September 2014 at Munhak Park Tae-hwan Aquatics Center.

== Schedule ==
All times are Korea Standard Time (UTC+09:00)

Date	Time	Event
Tuesday, 23 September 2014	20:35	Final

== Records ==
Prior to this competition, the existing world, Asian and Games records were as follows.

World Record	China	7:42.08	Rome, Italy	30 July 2009
Asian Record	China	7:42.08	Rome, Italy	30 July 2009
Games Record	China	7:51.81	Guangzhou, China	16 November 2010

== Results ==
Rank	Team	Time	Notes
1st place, gold medalist(s)	China (CHN)	7:55.17	
	Guo Junjun	1:58.09	
	Tang Yi	1:58.20	
	Cao Yue	1:58.28	
	Shen Duo	2:00.60	
2nd place, silver medalist(s)	Japan (JPN)	7:58.43	
	Chihiro Igarashi	1:59.22	
	Yasuko Miyamoto	1:58.84	
	Yayoi Matsumoto	2:00.73	
	Aya Takano	1:59.64	
3rd place, bronze medalist(s)	Hong Kong (HKG)	8:04.55	
	Camille Cheng	2:01.43	
	Stephanie Au	2:02.56	
	Sze Hang Yu	2:00.32	
	Siobhán Haughey	2:00.24	
4	South Korea (KOR)	8:11.55	
	Lee Da-lin	2:03.83	
	Ryu Ji-won	2:02.98	
	Kim Ga-eul	2:01.88	
	Kim Jung-hye	2:02.86	
5	Singapore (SIN)	8:12.09	
	Lynette Lim	2:03.59	
	Amanda Lim	2:02.38	
	Quah Ting Wen	2:01.16	
	Rachel Tseng	2:04.96	
6	Thailand (THA)	8:16.56	
	Benjaporn Sriphanomthorn	2:03.59	
	Sarisa Suwannachet	2:02.17	
	Patarawadee Kittiya	2:07.49	
	Natthanan Junkrajang	2:03.31	
7	Chinese Taipei (TPE)	8:23.77	
	Yang Ming-hsuan	2:04.24	
	Yang Chin-kuei	2:03.26	
	Sung Hsin-yi	2:05.93	
	Hsu An	2:10.34	
8	Macau (MAC)	8:48.53	
	Tan Chi Yan	2:08.98	
	Erica Vong	2:13.86	
	Lei On Kei	2:12.26	
	Ma Cheok Mei	2:13.43	
