= Yayoi Matsumoto =

Japanese swimmer (born 1990)

Personal information
- Nationality: Japan
- Born: 8 March 1990 (age 36) Shizuoka, Shizuoka, Japan
- Height: 1.68 m (5 ft 6 in)
- Weight: 65 kg (143 lb)

Sport
- Sport: Swimming
- Strokes: Freestyle
Medal record
Women's swimming
Representing Japan
Pan Pacific Championships
Bronze medal – third place	2014 Gold Coast	4×100 m freestyle
Asian Games
Silver medal – second place	2010 Guangzhou	4×100 m freestyle
Silver medal – second place	2010 Guangzhou	4×200 m freestyle
Silver medal – second place	2014 Incheon	4×100 m freestyle
Silver medal – second place	2014 Incheon	4×200 m freestyle
Bronze medal – third place	2010 Guangzhou	50 m freestyle

Yayoi Matsumoto (松本 弥生, Matsumoto Yayoi; born March 8, 1990 in Shizuoka, Shizuoka) is a Japanese swimmer. At the 2012 Summer Olympics, she competed for the national team in the Women's 4 × 100 metre freestyle relay, finishing in 7th place in the final. She also competed in the women's 50m freestyle, finishing with a time of 25.73 seconds in 35th place in the heats, and the 4 × 200 m freestyle relay. At the 2016 Summer Olympics, she competed in the 50 m freestyle, finishing in 43rd, and was part of the Japanese women's 4 × 100 m freestyle team.
