= Liu Xiaohan =

Chinese swimmer (born 2002)

Personal information
- Born: 14 July 2002 (age 23)

Sport
- Sport: Swimming
- Strokes: Freestyle
Medal record
Women's swimming
Representing China
World Championships (SC)
Gold medal – first place	2018 Hangzhou	4×200 m freestyle
Bronze medal – third place	2018 Hangzhou	4×100 m freestyle
Asian Games
Silver medal – second place	2018 Jakarta	4×100 m freestyle

Liu Xiaohan (born 14 July 2002) is a Chinese swimmer. She competed in the women's 4 × 100 metre freestyle relay event at the 2018 Asian Games, winning the silver medal.
