= Swimming at the 2014 Asian Games – Women's 4 × 100 metre freestyle relay =

Women's 4 × 100 metre freestyle relay at the 2014 Asian Games
- Venue: Munhak Park Tae-hwan Aquatics Center
- Date: 21 September 2014
- Competitors: 47 from 11 nations

Medalists
| gold medal | China; Ye Shiwen, Shen Duo, Zhang Yufei, Tang Yi, Qiu Yuhan, Chen Xinyi, Sun Meichen, Zhou Yilin |
| silver medal | Japan; Miki Uchida, Misaki Yamaguchi, Kanako Watanabe, Yayoi Matsumoto, Yasuko Miyamoto |
| bronze medal | Hong Kong; Camille Cheng, Stephanie Au, Sze Hang Yu, Siobhán Haughey |

The women's 4 × 100 metre freestyle relay event at the 2014 Asian Games took place on 21 September 2014 at Munhak Park Tae-hwan Aquatics Center.

== Schedule ==
All times are Korea Standard Time (UTC+09:00)

| Date | Time | Event |
|---|---|---|
| Sunday, 21 September 2014 | 09:00 | Heats |
| Sunday, 21 September 2014 | 20:17 | Final |

== Records ==
Prior to this competition, the existing world, Asian and Games records were as follows.

| World Record | Australia | 3:30.98 | Glasgow, United Kingdom | 24 July 2014 |
| Asian Record | China | 3:35.63 | Rome, Italy | 26 July 2009 |
| Games Record | China | 3:36.88 | Guangzhou, China | 14 November 2010 |

== Results ==
Legend

- DNS — Did not start
- DSQ — Disqualified

=== Heats ===
| Rank | Heat | Team | Time | Notes |
|---|---|---|---|---|
| 1 | 2 | China (CHN) | 3:39.41 | |
| | | Qiu Yuhan | 54.44 | |
| | | Chen Xinyi | 54.07 | |
| | | Sun Meichen | 54.61 | |
| | | Zhou Yilin | 56.29 | |
| 2 | 1 | Japan (JPN) | 3:43.05 | |
| | | Misaki Yamaguchi | 55.93 | |
| | | Miki Uchida | 54.90 | |
| | | Yasuko Miyamoto | 55.66 | |
| | | Yayoi Matsumoto | 56.56 | |
| 3 | 2 | Hong Kong (HKG) | 3:45.70 | |
| | | Camille Cheng | 56.00 | |
| | | Stephanie Au | 56.46 | |
| | | Sze Hang Yu | 57.49 | |
| | | Siobhán Haughey | 55.75 | |
| 4 | 2 | South Korea (KOR) | 3:46.89 | |
| | | Jung You-in | 56.80 | |
| | | Lee Byul-nim | 56.91 | |
| | | Hwang Seo-jin | 56.58 | |
| | | Ko Mi-so | 56.60 | |
| 5 | 1 | Singapore (SIN) | 3:52.63 | |
| | | Marina Chan | 58.19 | |
| | | Amanda Lim | 57.97 | |
| | | Quah Ting Wen | 57.72 | |
| | | Lynette Lim | 58.75 | |
| 6 | 2 | Chinese Taipei (TPE) | 3:52.97 | |
| | | Yang Ming-hsuan | 58.32 | |
| | | Hsu An | 58.59 | |
| | | Lin Pei-wun | 58.42 | |
| | | Yang Chin-kuei | 57.64 | |
| 7 | 1 | Thailand (THA) | 4:00.38 | |
| | | Jenjira Srisa-ard | 58.37 | |
| | | Patarawadee Kittiya | 1:00.42 | |
| | | Benjaporn Sriphanomthorn | 1:00.92 | |
| | | Natthanan Junkrajang | 1:00.67 | |
| 8 | 2 | Mongolia (MGL) | 4:40.01 | |
| | | Enkhmandakhyn Nandinzayaa | 1:12.97 | |
| | | Bayaryn Yesüi | 1:09.52 | |
| | | Saintöriin Nomun | 1:10.73 | |
| | | Tsogtgereliin Möngönsor | 1:06.79 | |
| 9 | 1 | Maldives (MDV) | 5:11.81 | |
| | | Aminath Shajan | 1:08.71 | |
| | | Fathimath Zuhura Ismail | 1:22.56 | |
| | | Aishath Anha Haisham | 1:24.20 | |
| | | Aishath Sajina | 1:16.34 | |
| — | 2 | Macau (MAC) | DSQ | |
| | | Tan Chi Yan | 58.69 | |
| | | Erica Vong | | |
| | | Ma Cheok Mei | | |
| | | Lei On Kei | | |
| — | 1 | Pakistan (PAK) | DNS | |
| | | — | | |
| | | — | | |
| | | — | | |
| | | — | | |

=== Final ===
| Rank | Team | Time | Notes |
|---|---|---|---|
| 1st place, gold medalist(s) | China (CHN) | 3:37.25 | |
| | Ye Shiwen | 54.94 | |
| | Shen Duo | 53.58 | |
| | Zhang Yufei | 54.10 | |
| | Tang Yi | 54.63 | |
| 2nd place, silver medalist(s) | Japan (JPN) | 3:39.35 | |
| | Miki Uchida | 54.41 | |
| | Misaki Yamaguchi | 55.00 | |
| | Kanako Watanabe | 55.34 | |
| | Yayoi Matsumoto | 54.60 | |
| 3rd place, bronze medalist(s) | Hong Kong (HKG) | 3:39.94 | |
| | Camille Cheng | 55.67 | |
| | Stephanie Au | 55.51 | |
| | Sze Hang Yu | 55.05 | |
| | Siobhán Haughey | 53.71 | |
| 4 | South Korea (KOR) | 3:45.36 | |
| | Ko Mi-so | 56.56 | |
| | Hwang Seo-jin | 56.62 | |
| | Jung You-in | 56.05 | |
| | Lee Byul-nim | 56.13 | |
| 5 | Singapore (SIN) | 3:47.62 | |
| | Marina Chan | 57.58 | |
| | Amanda Lim | 56.19 | |
| | Quah Ting Wen | 56.44 | |
| | Lynette Lim | 57.41 | |
| 6 | Thailand (THA) | 3:49.79 | |
| | Natthanan Junkrajang | 56.79 | |
| | Jenjira Srisa-ard | 57.56 | |
| | Benjaporn Sriphanomthorn | 57.59 | |
| | Sarisa Suwannachet | 57.85 | |
| 7 | Chinese Taipei (TPE) | 3:50.66 | |
| | Yang Chin-kuei | 57.61 | |
| | Lin Pei-wun | 57.75 | |
| | Yang Ming-hsuan | 57.64 | |
| | Sung Hsin-yi | 57.66 | |
| — | Mongolia (MGL) | DNS | |
| | — | | |
| | — | | |
| | — | | |
| | — | | |
