= Wang Jingzhuo =

Chinese swimmer (born 1999)

Personal information
- Nationality: Chinese
- Born: 12 July 1999 (age 26)

Sport
- Sport: Swimming
- Strokes: Freestyle
Medal record
Women's swimming
Representing China
World Championships (SC)
Bronze medal – third place	2018 Hangzhou	4×100 m freestyle
Asian Games
Silver medal – second place	2018 Jakarta	4×100 m freestyle

Wang Jingzhuo (born 12 July 1999) is a Chinese swimmer. She competed in the women's 4 × 100 metre freestyle relay event at the 2018 Asian Games, winning the silver medal.
