= Swimming at the 2010 Asian Games – Women's 4 × 100 metre freestyle relay =

Women's 4 × 100 metre freestyle relay at the 2010 Asian Games
- Venue: Aoti Aquatics Centre
- Date: 14 November 2010
- Competitors: 32 from 8 nations

Medalists
gold medal	China; Li Zhesi, Wang Shijia, Zhu Qianwei, Tang Yi
silver medal	Japan; Haruka Ueda, Yayoi Matsumoto, Tomoko Hagiwara, Hanae Ito
bronze medal	Hong Kong; Sze Hang Yu, Yu Wai Ting, Stephanie Au, Hannah Wilson

The women's 4 × 100 metre freestyle relay event at the 2010 Asian Games took place on 14 November 2010 at Guangzhou Aoti Aquatics Centre.

There were 8 teams who took part in this event. China won the gold medal, Japan and Hong Kong won the silver and bronze medal respectively.

== Schedule ==
All times are China Standard Time (UTC+08:00)

Date	Time	Event
Sunday, 14 November 2010	19:14	Final

== Records ==
Prior to this competition, the existing world, Asian and Games records were as follows.

World Record	Netherlands	3:31.72	Rome, Italy	26 July 2009
Asian Record	China	3:35.63	Rome, Italy	26 July 2009
Games Record	China	3:40.95	Busan, South Korea	3 October 2002

== Results ==
Rank	Team	Time	Notes
1st place, gold medalist(s)	China (CHN)	3:36.88	GR
	Li Zhesi	54.87	
	Wang Shijia	54.28	
	Zhu Qianwei	54.17	
	Tang Yi	53.56	
2nd place, silver medalist(s)	Japan (JPN)	3:37.90	
	Haruka Ueda	54.96	
	Yayoi Matsumoto	54.42	
	Tomoko Hagiwara	54.58	
	Hanae Ito	53.94	
3rd place, bronze medalist(s)	Hong Kong (HKG)	3:43.17	
	Sze Hang Yu	55.99	
	Yu Wai Ting	57.24	
	Stephanie Au	55.66	
	Hannah Wilson	54.28	
4	South Korea (KOR)	3:45.86	
	Choi Hye-ra	57.08	
	Seo Youn-jeong	56.84	
	Park Na-ri	56.47	
	Lee Jae-young	55.47	
5	Singapore (SIN)	3:49.17	
	Quah Ting Wen	57.22	
	Mylene Ong	56.88	
	Amanda Lim	57.54	
	Koh Hui Yu	57.53	
6	Thailand (THA)	3:51.66	
	Natsaya Susuk	57.56	
	Benjaporn Sriphanomthorn	58.45	
	Chawiwan Khammee	58.85	
	Natthanan Junkrajang	56.80	
7	Malaysia (MAS)	3:52.98	
	Chan Kah Yan	58.41	
	Leung Chii Lin	58.67	
	Khoo Cai Lin	58.54	
	Chui Lai Kwan	57.36	
8	Macau (MAC)	4:06.69	
	Ma Cheok Mei	59.99	
	Lei On Kei	1:02.01	
	Kuan Weng I	1:02.05	
	Tan Chi Yan	1:02.64	
