= Swimming at the 2018 Asian Games – Women's 4 × 100 metre freestyle relay =

Women's 4 × 100 metre freestyle relay at the 2018 Asian Games
- Venue: Gelora Bung Karno Aquatic Stadium
- Date: 19 August 2018
- Competitors: 50 from 11 nations

Medalists
gold medal	Japan; Rikako Ikee, Natsumi Sakai, Tomomi Aoki, Chihiro Igarashi, Mayuka Yamamoto, Rio Shirai
silver medal	China; Zhu Menghui, Wu Yue, Wu Qingfeng, Yang Junxuan, Wang Jingzhuo, Lao Lihui, Liu Xiaohan
bronze medal	Hong Kong; Camille Cheng, Stephanie Au, Tam Hoi Lam, Sze Hang Yu, Tinky Ho

The women's 4 × 100 metre freestyle relay event at the 2018 Asian Games took place on 19 August at the Gelora Bung Karno Aquatic Stadium.

== Schedule ==
All times are Western Indonesia Time (UTC+07:00)

Date	Time	Event
Sunday, 19 August 2018	10:30	Heats
Sunday, 19 August 2018	19:44	Final

== Records ==
Prior to this competition, the existing world, Asian and Games records were as follows.

World Record	Australia	3:30.05	Gold Coast, Australia	5 April 2018
Asian Record	China	3:35.63	Rome, Italy	26 July 2009
Games Record	China	3:36.88	Guangzhou, China	14 November 2010

== Results ==
Legend

- DNS — Did not start

=== Heats ===
Rank	Heat	Team	Time	Notes
1	2	China (CHN)	3:40.32	
		Wang Jingzhuo	55.06	
		Lao Lihui	55.02	
		Liu Xiaohan	54.73	
		Zhu Menghui	55.51	
2	1	Japan (JPN)	3:42.47	
		Mayuka Yamamoto	55.74	
		Rio Shirai	55.85	
		Tomomi Aoki	55.61	
		Chihiro Igarashi	55.27	
3	2	Hong Kong (HKG)	3:45.45	
		Camille Cheng	55.79	
		Stephanie Au	56.87	
		Tinky Ho	56.62	
		Tam Hoi Lam	56.17	
4	1	Singapore (SGP)	3:45.99	
		Quah Jing Wen	56.27	
		Cherlyn Yeoh	56.53	
		Marina Chan	56.75	
		Amanda Lim	56.44	
5	1	Thailand (THA)	3:46.98	
		Manita Sathianchokwisan	56.90	
		Kornkarnjana Sapianchai	56.16	
		Jenjira Srisa-ard	57.21	
		Natthanan Junkrajang	56.71	
6	2	South Korea (KOR)	3:47.91	
		Ko Mi-so	56.49	
		Kim Min-ju	56.26	
		Kim Jin-ha	57.43	
		Park Han-byeol	57.73	
7	2	Indonesia (INA)	3:52.49	
		Adinda Larasati Dewi	59.64	
		Ressa Kania Dewi	57.68	
		Sagita Putri Krisdewanti	57.60	
		Patricia Yosita Hapsari	57.57	
8	1	Macau (MAC)	3:59.49	
		Tan Chi Yan	59.63	
		Erica Vong	59.13	
		Lei On Kei	1:00.57	
		Long Chi Wai	1:00.16	
9	2	Mongolia (MGL)	4:14.58	
		Altanshagain Kherlen	1:06.78	
		Khuyagbaataryn Enkhzul	1:02.76	
		Bayaryn Yesüi	1:04.40	
		Batbayaryn Enkhkhüslen	1:00.64	
10	2	Maldives (MDV)	5:09.90	
		Aishath Sajina	1:21.93	
		Aishath Hulva Khulail	1:20.80	
		Anmau Ahmed Saleem	1:14.42	
		Aishath Sausan	1:12.75	
—	1	Tajikistan (TJK)	DNS	
		—		
		—		
		—		
		—		

=== Final ===
Rank	Team	Time	Notes
1st place, gold medalist(s)	Japan (JPN)	3:36.52	GR
	Rikako Ikee	53.60	GR
	Natsumi Sakai	54.81	
	Tomomi Aoki	54.21	
	Chihiro Igarashi	53.90	
2nd place, silver medalist(s)	China (CHN)	3:36.78	
	Zhu Menghui	54.00	
	Wu Yue	54.67	
	Wu Qingfeng	54.43	
	Yang Junxuan	53.68	
3rd place, bronze medalist(s)	Hong Kong (HKG)	3:41.88	
	Camille Cheng	54.98	
	Stephanie Au	55.60	
	Tam Hoi Lam	56.05	
	Sze Hang Yu	55.25	
4	Singapore (SGP)	3:44.21	
	Quah Jing Wen	56.32	
	Quah Ting Wen	55.78	
	Christie Chue	56.46	
	Cherlyn Yeoh	55.65	
5	Thailand (THA)	3:45.93	
	Manita Sathianchokwisan	56.73	
	Kornkarnjana Sapianchai	55.86	
	Jenjira Srisa-ard	57.06	
	Natthanan Junkrajang	56.28	
6	South Korea (KOR)	3:48.76	
	Ko Mi-so	56.62	
	Kim Min-ju	56.92	
	Choi Jung-min	57.60	
	Park Ye-rin	57.62	
7	Indonesia (INA)	3:51.32	
	Sagita Putri Krisdewanti	58.11	
	Ressa Kania Dewi	57.76	
	Adinda Larasati Dewi	58.35	
	Patricia Yosita Hapsari	57.10	
8	Macau (MAC)	3:57.65	
	Tan Chi Yan	59.02	
	Erica Vong	58.98	
	Lei On Kei	59.30	
	Long Chi Wai	1:00.35	
