= Swimming at the 2022 Asian Games – Women's 4 × 100 metre freestyle relay =

Women's 4 × 100 metre freestyle relay at the 2022 Asian Games
- Venue: Hangzhou Olympic Expo Aquatics Center
- Date: 24 September 2023
- Competitors: 47 from 10 nations

Medalists
| gold medal | China; Yang Junxuan, Cheng Yujie, Wu Qingfeng, Zhang Yufei, Li Bingjie, Yu Yiting, Liu Yaxin |
| silver medal | Japan; Nagisa Ikemoto, Chihiro Igarashi, Rikako Ikee, Rio Shirai |
| bronze medal | Hong Kong; Camille Cheng, Siobhán Haughey, Tam Hoi Lam, Stephanie Au, Natalie Kan |

The women's 4 × 100 metre freestyle relay event at the 2022 Asian Games took place on 24 September 2023 at the Hangzhou Olympic Expo Center.

== Schedule ==
All times are China Standard Time (UTC+08:00)

| Date | Time | Event |
|---|---|---|
| Sunday, 24 September 2023 | 11:36 | Heats |
| Sunday, 24 September 2023 | 21:11 | Final |

== Records ==
Prior to this competition, the existing world, Asian and Games records were as follows.

| World Record | Australia | 3:27.96 | Fukuoka, Japan | 23 July 2023 |
| Asian Record | China | 3:32.40 | Fukuoka, Japan | 23 July 2023 |
| Games Record | Japan | 3:36.52 | Jakarta, Indonesia | 19 August 2018 |

== Results ==
=== Heats ===
| Rank | Heat | Team | Time | Notes |
|---|---|---|---|---|
| 1 | 2 | China (CHN) | 3:37.53 | |
| | | Li Bingjie | 54.32 | |
| | | Yu Yiting | 54.41 | |
| | | Wu Qingfeng | 54.29 | |
| | | Liu Yaxin | 54.51 | |
| 2 | 2 | Japan (JPN) | 3:40.89 | |
| | | Nagisa Ikemoto | 54.40 | |
| | | Rikako Ikee | 55.64 | |
| | | Rio Shirai | 55.44 | |
| | | Chihiro Igarashi | 55.41 | |
| 3 | 1 | Singapore (SGP) | 3:46.87 | |
| | | Quah Ting Wen | 56.82 | |
| | | Amanda Lim | 56.24 | |
| | | Marina Chan | 56.71 | |
| | | Christie Chue | 57.10 | |
| 4 | 1 | Hong Kong (HKG) | 3:47.99 | |
| | | Natalie Kan | 57.38 | |
| | | Tam Hoi Lam | 58.75 | |
| | | Camille Cheng | 56.00 | |
| | | Stephanie Au | 55.86 | |
| 5 | 2 | Philippines (PHI) | 3:48.06 | |
| | | Jasmine Al-Khaldi | 57.60 | |
| | | Xiandi Chua | 56.72 | |
| | | Teia Salvino | 56.37 | |
| | | Chloe Isleta | 57.37 | |
| 6 | 2 | India (IND) | 3:53.80 | |
| | | Dhinidhi Desinghu | 58.15 | |
| | | Maana Patel | 57.71 | |
| | | Janhvi Choudhary | 59.60 | |
| | | Shivangi Sarma | 58.34 | |
| 7 | 1 | Thailand (THA) | 3:54.37 | |
| | | Napatsawan Jaritkla | 58.47 | |
| | | Mia Millar | 58.39 | |
| | | Pannita Chawanuchit | 58.27 | |
| | | Kornkarnjana Sapianchai | 59.24 | |
| 8 | 1 | Macau (MAC) | 4:05.62 | |
| | | Chen Pui Lam | 1:00.20 | |
| | | Kuok Hei Cheng | 1:01.85 | |
| | | Cheang Weng Chi | 1:01.59 | |
| | | Cheang Weng Lam | 1:01.98 | |
| 9 | 2 | Mongolia (MGL) | 4:06.00 | |
| | | Batbayaryn Enkhkhüslen | 56.55 | |
| | | Batnasangiin Maral | 1:01.58 | |
| | | Ganbaataryn Nomuunaa | 1:03.78 | |
| | | Temüüjingiin Anungoo | 1:04.09 | |
| 10 | 1 | Maldives (MDV) | 4:48.47 | |
| | | Meral Ayn Latheef | 1:09.61 | |
| | | Een Abbas Shareef | 1:18.03 | |
| | | Hanan Hussain Haleem | 1:10.21 | |
| | | Hamna Ahmed | 1:10.62 | |

=== Final ===
| Rank | Team | Time | Notes |
|---|---|---|---|
| 1st place, gold medalist(s) | China (CHN) | 3:33.96 | GR |
| | Yang Junxuan | 53.86 | |
| | Cheng Yujie | 53.07 | |
| | Wu Qingfeng | 53.84 | |
| | Zhang Yufei | 53.19 | |
| 2nd place, silver medalist(s) | Japan (JPN) | 3:38.48 | |
| | Nagisa Ikemoto | 54.59 | |
| | Chihiro Igarashi | 54.93 | |
| | Rikako Ikee | 54.66 | |
| | Rio Shirai | 54.30 | |
| 3rd place, bronze medalist(s) | Hong Kong (HKG) | 3:39.10 | |
| | Camille Cheng | 56.11 | |
| | Siobhán Haughey | 51.92 | |
| | Tam Hoi Lam | 55.66 | |
| | Stephanie Au | 55.41 | |
| 4 | Singapore (SGP) | 3:44.16 | |
| | Quah Ting Wen | 55.61 | |
| | Quah Jing Wen | 56.61 | |
| | Marina Chan | 56.42 | |
| | Amanda Lim | 55.52 | |
| 5 | Philippines (PHI) | 3:44.31 | |
| | Kayla Sanchez | 54.71 | |
| | Xiandi Chua | 56.37 | |
| | Teia Salvino | 56.38 | |
| | Jasmine Al-Khaldi | 56.85 | |
| 6 | Thailand (THA) | 3:52.87 | |
| | Kamonchanok Kwanmuang | 57.62 | |
| | Pannita Chawanuchit | 58.66 | |
| | Napatsawan Jaritkla | 58.35 | |
| | Kornkarnjana Sapianchai | 58.24 | |
| 7 | India (IND) | 3:54.66 | |
| | Dhinidhi Desinghu | 58.27 | |
| | Maana Patel | 57.84 | |
| | Janhvi Choudhary | 59.85 | |
| | Shivangi Sarma | 58.70 | |
| 8 | Macau (MAC) | 4:01.69 | |
| | Chen Pui Lam | 58.92 | |
| | Kuok Hei Cheng | 59.97 | |
| | Cheang Weng Lam | 1:01.70 | |
| | Cheang Weng Chi | 1:01.10 | |
