= Rio Shirai =

Japanese swimmer (born 1999)

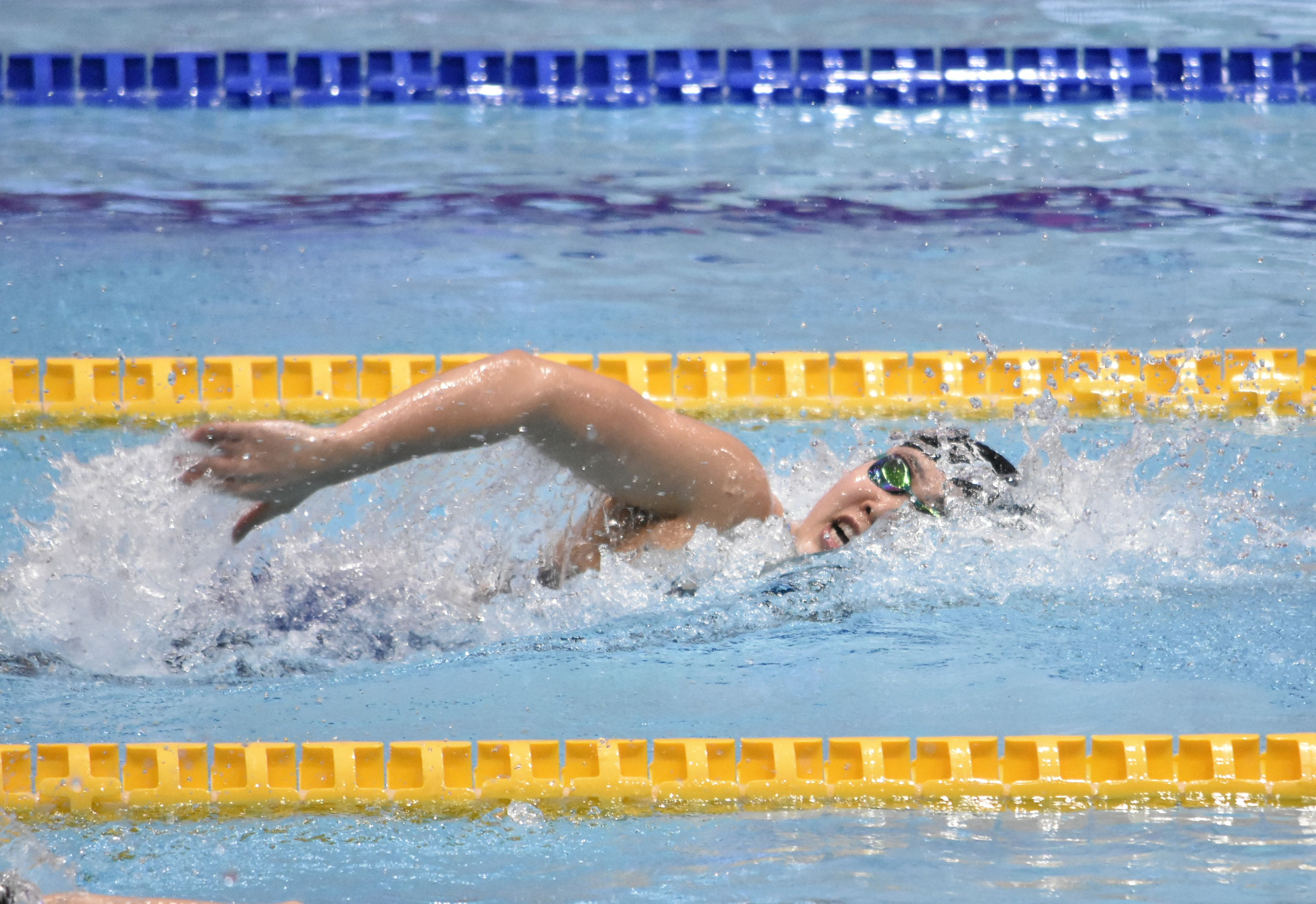
- Shirai in 2020

Personal information
- Born: 10 September 1999 (age 27)

Sport
- Sport: Swimming
- Strokes: Freestyle
Medal record
Women's swimming
Representing Japan
Asian Games
Gold medal – first place	2018 Jakarta	4×100 m freestyle
Silver medal – second place	2018 Jakarta	4×200 m freestyle
Silver medal – second place	2022 Hangzhou	4×100 m freestyle
Silver medal – second place	2022 Hangzhou	4×200 m freestyle
Silver medal – second place	2026 Aichi–Nagoya	100 m backstroke
Silver medal – second place	2026 Aichi–Nagoya	4×100 m medley
Bronze medal – third place	2026 Aichi–Nagoya	200 m backstroke
Junior Pan Pacific Championships
Gold medal – first place	2014 Maui	200 m backstroke
Silver medal – second place	2014 Maui	4×100 m medley
Bronze medal – third place	2014 Maui	100 m backstroke
Bronze medal – third place	2016 Maui	4×200 m freestyle

Rio Shirai (白井 璃緒, Shirai Rio; born 10 September 1999) is a Japanese swimmer. She competed in the women's 4 × 100 metre freestyle relay event at the 2018 Asian Games, winning the gold medal.

As a 14-year-old at the 2014 Junior Pan Pacific Swimming Championships in Hawaii, United States, Shirai won the gold medal in the 200 metre backstroke with a 2:11.67, the bronze medal in the 100 metre backstroke with a 1:01.82, and a silver medal in the 4×100 metre medley relay with a final relay time of 4:04.11. The following edition, the 2016 Junior Pan Pacific Swimming Championships also held in Hawaii, United States, she won a bronze medal in the 4×200 metre freestyle relay, splitting a 1:59.88 for the fourth leg of the relay to help achieve a final time of 8:08.12.
