= Nicholas Lim (swimmer) =

Hong Kong swimmer (born 2001)

Personal information
- Born: 1 April 2001 (age 25) Hong Kong

Sport
- Sport: Swimming

Nicholas Lim (born 1 April 2001) is a Hong Kong swimmer. In 2019, he represented Hong Kong at the 2019 World Aquatics Championships in Gwangju, South Korea. He competed in the men's 100 metre butterfly and men's 200 metre butterfly events. He also competed in three relay events.

In 2018, he represented Hong Kong at the 2018 Asian Games held in Jakarta, Indonesia. He competed in the men's 100 metre butterfly and men's 200 metre butterfly events. He also competed in two relay events.
