= Chihiro Igarashi =

Japanese swimmer (born 1995)

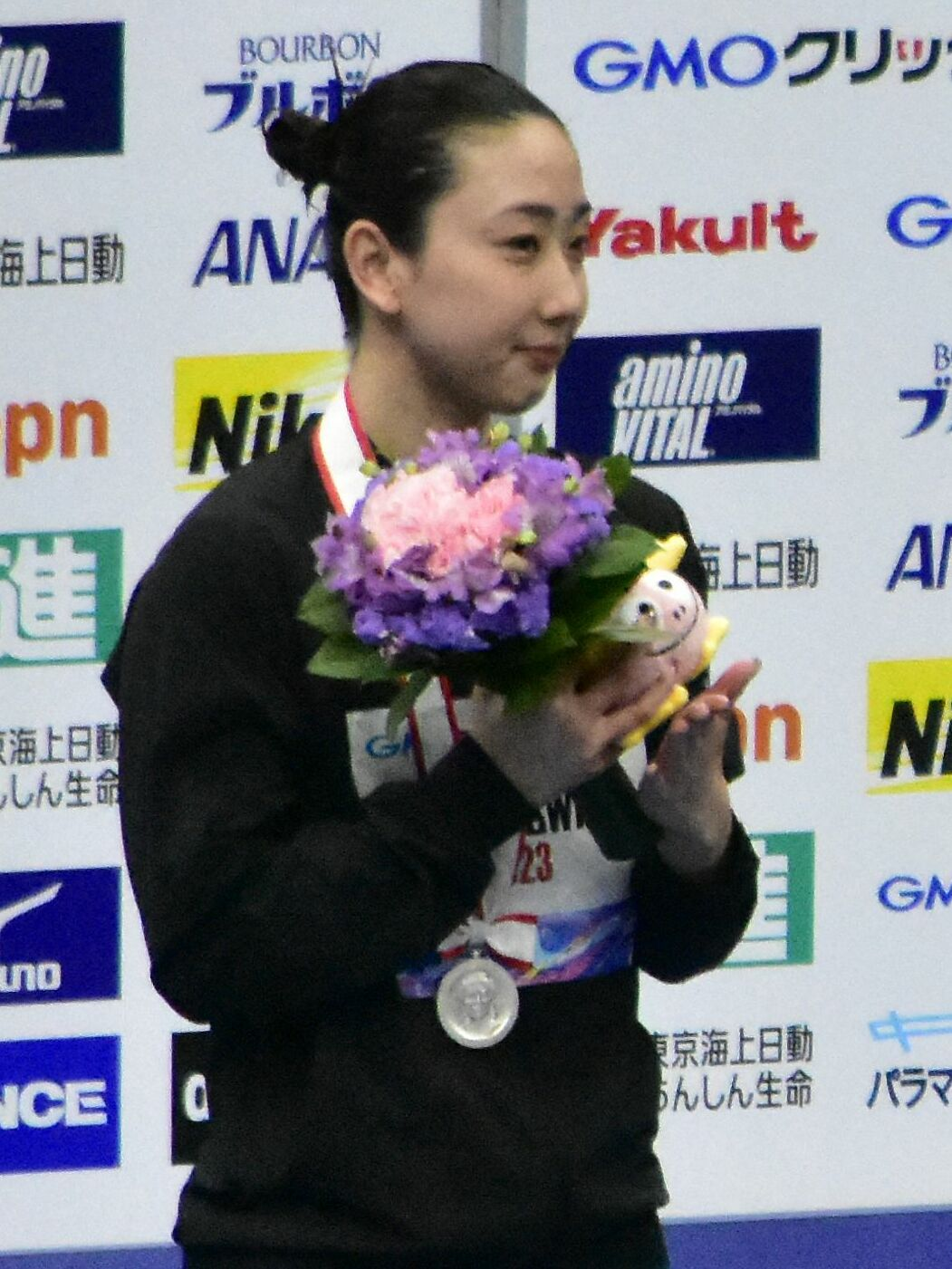

Personal information
- Born: 24 May 1995 (age 31) Kanagawa, Japan

Sport
- Sport: Swimming
- Strokes: freestyle
Medal record
Representing Japan
World Championships (SC)
Bronze medal – third place	2016 Windsor	400 m freestyle
Asian Games
Gold medal – first place	2018 Jakarta	4×100 m freestyle
Silver medal – second place	2018 Jakarta	4×200 m freestyle
Silver medal – second place	2022 Hangzhou	4×100 m freestyle
Bronze medal – third place	2018 Jakarta	200 m freestyle
Bronze medal – third place	2018 Jakarta	400 m freestyle
Universiade
Gold medal – first place	2017 Taipei	4×100 m medley
Bronze medal – third place	2017 Taipei	4×200 m freestyle
Junior Pan Pacific Championships
Silver medal – second place	2012 Honolulu	200 m medley

Chihiro Igarashi (五十嵐 千尋, Igarashi Chihiro; born 24 May 1995) is a Japanese swimmer. She competed in the women's 400 metre freestyle event at the 2016 Summer Olympics. She qualified to represent Japan at the 2020 Summer Olympics.
