= Tam Hoi Lam =

Hong Kong swimmer (born 1998)

Personal information
- Nationality: Hong Konger
- Born: 21 April 1998 (age 28) Hong Kong
- Height: 178 cm (5 ft 10 in)
- Weight: 54 kg (119 lb)

Sport
- Sport: Swimming
- College team: University of British Columbia
Medal record
Representing Hong Kong
Women's Swimming
Asian Games
Silver medal – second place	2018 Jakarta	4×100 m medley
Bronze medal – third place	2014 Incheon	4×100 m medley
Bronze medal – third place	2018 Jakarta	4×100 m freestyle
Bronze medal – third place	2022 Hangzhou	4×100 m medley
Bronze medal – third place	2022 Hangzhou	4×100 m freestyle
Asian Indoor and Martial Arts Games
Silver medal – second place	2017 Ashgabat	4×50 m freestyle

Tam Hoi Lam (born 21 April 1998) is a Hong Kong female swimmer and a Hong Kong national record holder in swimming. She represented Hong Kong at the Asian Games in 2014, winning a bronze medal in the women's 4 × 100 metre medley relay and also claimed a bronze medal in the 4 × 100 metre freestyle relay during the 2018 Asian Games.

Tam Hoi Lam jointly with Stephanie Au, Chan Kin Lok and Sze Hang Yu set the national record in the women's 4 × 50 metre freestyle relay event at the 2017 Asian Indoor and Martial Arts Games when the trio claimed silver medal in the women's 4 × 50 metre freestyle relay
