= William Yan Thorley =

Hong Kong swimmer (born 2002)

Personal information
- Born: 3 September 2002 (age 24) Hong Kong

Sport
- Country: Hong Kong
- Sport: Swimming
- Event: Marathon swimming

William Yan Thorley (born 3 September 2002) is a Hong Kong marathon swimmer.

He competed in the 2020 Summer Olympics and finished 22nd in the men's 10 kilometer race. He was the youngest swimmer in the field at 18 years old, becoming Hong Kong's first ever male qualifier.

His key swimming achievements include competing at 4 World Championships in 2019, 2022, 2023, 2024. Competing over the 5km, 10km and 4 × 1500 m relay events. William was a key part of a 4 × 1500 m relay team in 2022 that achieved 15th place. He also competed at the 2019 ANOC World Beach Games and the 2022 Asian Games.
