= Claudia Lau =

Hong Kong swimmer (born 1992)

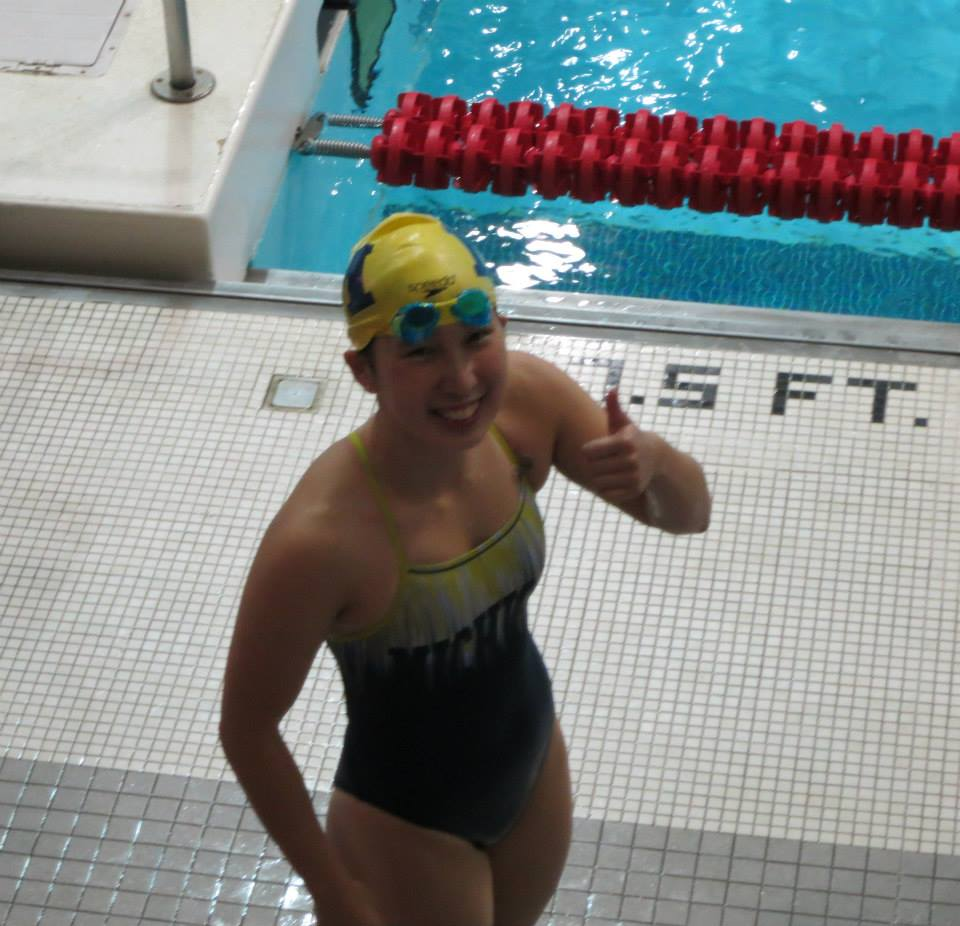

Personal information
- Nationality: Chinese
- Born: 11 November 1992 (age 33)

Sport
- Sport: Swimming
Medal record
Representing Hong Kong
Asian Games
Bronze medal – third place	2010 Guangzhou	4x100m medley relay
Bronze medal – third place	2014 Incheon	4x100m medley relay

Claudia Lau Yin Yan (born 11 November 1992) is a Hong Kong competitive swimmer.

She qualified to the 2016 Summer Olympics in Rio de Janeiro, and was selected to represent Hong Kong in the women's 100 metre backstroke and 200 metre backststroke.
