= Chan Kin Lok =

Hong Kong swimmer (born 1994)

Personal information
- Born: 7 March 1994 (age 32)

Sport
- Sport: Swimming
Medal record
Women's swimming
Representing Hong Kong
Asian Games
Silver medal – second place	2018 Jakarta	4×100 m medley
Bronze medal – third place	2014 Incheon	4×100 m medley
Bronze medal – third place	2018 Jakarta	4×200 m freestyle

Chan Kin Lok (born 7 March 1994) is a Hong Kong swimmer. She represented Hong Kong at the World Aquatics Championships in 2013, 2017 and 2019, as well as in the Short Course Worlds in 2012, 2014, 2016, 2018, 2021 and 2022.

== Career ==
She competed in the women's 50 metre butterfly and women's 4 × 100 metre freestyle relay events at the 2017 Summer Universiade held in Taipei, Taiwan.

In 2018, she won the silver medal in the women's 4 × 100 metre medley relay event at the 2018 Asian Games held in Jakarta, Indonesia. She also won the bronze medal in the women's 4 × 200 metre freestyle relay event.

In 2019, she represented Hong Kong at the 2019 World Aquatics Championships held in Gwangju, South Korea. She competed in the women's 50 metre butterfly and women's 100 metre butterfly events and in both events she did not advance to compete in the semi-finals. She also competed in the women's 4 × 100 metre medley relay event.
