= Camille Cheng =

Hong Kong swimmer (born 1993)

Personal information
- Full name: Camille Cheng Lily-mei
- National team: Hong Kong
- Born: 9 May 1993 (age 33) Hong Kong

Sport
- Sport: Swimming
- Strokes: Freestyle
- College team: University of California, Berkeley
Medal record
Asian Games
Silver medal – second place	2018 Jakarta	4×100 m medley
Bronze medal – third place	2014 Incheon	4×100 m freestyle
Bronze medal – third place	2014 Incheon	4×200 m freestyle
Bronze medal – third place	2018 Jakarta	4×100 m freestyle
Bronze medal – third place	2018 Jakarta	4×200 m freestyle
Bronze medal – third place	2022 Hangzhou	4×100 m medley
Bronze medal – third place	2022 Hangzhou	4×100 m freestyle

Camille Cheng Lily-mei
- Traditional Chinese: 鄭莉梅
- Simplified Chinese: 郑莉梅
Transcriptions
Standard Mandarin
- Hanyu Pinyin: Zhèng Lìméi
Yue: Cantonese
- Jyutping: zeng6 lei6 mui4

Camille Cheng Lily-mei (Chinese: 鄭莉梅; born 9 May 1993) is a Hong Kong competitive swimmer.

She qualified to the 2016 Summer Olympics in Rio de Janeiro, and was selected to represent Hong Kong in the women's 50 metre freestyle, 100 metre freestyle, 200 metre freestyle, and 4x100 metre medley relay.

She subsequently represented Hong Kong in the 2020 Summer Olympics in Tokyo, where she competed in the 4 × 100 m medley relay, 4 × 100 m freestyle relay and the 4 × 200 metre freestyle relay.

In 2024, Cheng represented Hong Kong again in the 2024 Summer Olympics in Paris where she swam the women's 4 x 100 metre freestyle relay.

== Early life, education and career ==
Born on 9 May 1993 in Hong Kong to a Taiwanese father Cheng Wong-ping and French mother Catherine. She speaks French, English and Mandarin. She went to French International School until the age of nine, when her family moved to Beijing for her father's engineering job. She attended the International School of Beijing.

She swam for the University of California, Berkeley, team under Olympic coach Teri McKeever and alongside the already Olympian medalist Sara Isaković. She became joint captain in her final year before graduating university with a degree in psychology. Cheng took Bronze at the Asian Games in 2014. In December 2015, Cheng made an Olympic A time (which guarantees a place) at the United States National Championships in 200 metre freestyle. She became one of three Hong Kong women to have ever made an A time.

In 2020, Cheng qualified for the 2020 Summer Olympics in Tokyo. In 2024, Cheng qualified for the 2024 Summer Olympics in Paris where she swam the women's 4 x 100 metre freestyle relay.

== Competition Rankings ==
Year	Competition	Location	Ranking	Race
2013	Universiade	Kazan	8th	4 × 200 m freestyle
2014	Asian Games	Incheon	7th	200 m freestyle
2014	Asian Games	Incheon	6th	100 m freestyle
2014	Asian Games	Incheon	3rd	4 × 200 m freestyle
2014	Asian Games	Incheon	3rd	4 × 100 m freestyle
2014	Pan Pacific Championships	Gold Coast	8th	100 m freestyle
2014	Pan Pacific Championships	Gold Coast	7th	4 × 100 m freestyle
2014	Pan Pacific Championships	Gold Coast	6th	4 × 200 m freestyle
2014	Pan Pacific Championships	Gold Coast	6th	4 × 100 m 4 strokes
2015	World Championships	Kazan	32nd	100 m freestyle
2016	Summer Olympics	Rio de Janeiro	44th	50 m freestyle
2016	Summer Olympics	Rio de Janeiro	24th	100 m freestyle
2016	Summer Olympics	Rio de Janeiro	29th	200 m freestyle
2018	Asian Games	Jakarta	5th	100 m freestyle
2018	Asian Games	Jakarta	6th	200 m freestyle
2018	Asian Games	Jakarta	3rd	4 × 100 m freestyle
2018	Asian Games	Jakarta	3rd	4 × 200 m freestyle
2018	Asian Games	Jakarta	2nd	4 × 100 m women's 4 strokes
2019	World Championships	Gwangju	10th	4 × 100 m freestyle
2019	World Championships	Gwangju	11th	4 × 200 m freestyle
2019	World Championships	Gwangju	10th	4 × 100 m freestyle relay
2019	World Championships	Gwangju	11th	4 × 200 m freestyle relay
2020	Summer Olympics	Tokyo	13th	4 × 100 m medley relay
2020	Summer Olympics	Tokyo	15th	4 × 100 m freestyle relay
2020	Summer Olympics	Tokyo	DNS	4 × 200 metre freestyle relay
2022	World Championships	Budapest	32th	50 m freestyle
2022	World Championships	Budapest	16th	4 × 100 m mixed freestyle relay
2022	World Championships	Budapest	13th	4 × 100 m mixed medley relay
2023	Asian Games	Hangzhou	4th	4 × 100 m freestyle relay
2023	Asian Games	Hangzhou	3rd	4 × 100 m medley relay
2023	Asian Games	Hangzhou	3rd	4 × 200 m freestyle relay
2023	World Championships	Fukuoka	12th	4 × 100 m freestyle relay
2023	World Championships	Fukuoka	16th	4 × 100 m medley relay
2023	World Championships	Fukuoka	22nd	4 × 100 m mixed freestyle relay
2024	World Championships	Doha	9th	4 × 100 m freestyle relay
2024	World Championships	Doha	8th	4 × 100 m medley relay
2024	World Championships	Doha	8th	4 × 100 m mixed freestyle relay
2024	Summer Olympics	Paris	15th	4 × 100 m freestyle relay

== Personal bests ==
Long course 50 m
Race	Time	Location	Date
50 m freestyle	25 s 74	TYR Pro Swim Series	7 March 2020
100 m freestyle	54 s 86	Austin	15 January 2016
200 m freestyle	1 min 58 s 78	Federal Way	4 December 2015
400 m freestyle	4 min 24 s 4	Minneapolis	13 November 2015
100 m freestyle (lap)	54 s 37	Rio de Janeiro	12 August 2016
200 m freestyle (lap)	2 min 00 s 85	Jakarta	21 August 2018
50 m butterfly	28 s 74	2021-22 Div.1 Age Group LC Swimming Comp P2	30 May 2021
100 m butterfly	1 min 02 s 94	Los Angeles	20 July 2014

Short course 25 m
Race	Time	Location	Date
50 m freestyle	25 s 68	Hong Kong	30 September 2017
100 m freestyle	54 s 78	Hong Kong	1 October 2017
200 m freestyle	2 min 00 s 09	Hong Kong	30 September 2017
