= Ian Ho =

Hong Kong swimmer (born 1997)

Personal information
- Full name: Ian Yentou Ho
- National team: Hong Kong
- Born: 25 April 1997 (age 29) Blacksburg, Virginia, U.S.
- Height: 1.88 m (6 ft 2 in)

Sport
- Sport: Swimming
- College team: Virginia Tech
Medal record
Men's swimming
Representing Hong Kong
Asian Games
Silver medal – second place	2022 Hangzhou	50 m freestyle
Silver medal – second place	2026 Aichi–Nagoya	50 m freestyle

Ian Yentou Ho (Chinese: 何甄陶; born 25 April 1997) is a freestyle swimmer. Born in the United States, he represents Hong Kong internationally. He competed in the 2020 Summer Olympics. He won silver in the men's 50-metre freestyle for Hong Kong during the 2022 Asian Games in Hangzhou. Ian is the fastest 50m freestyler in Hong Kong history, with a record of 21.71.

Ho swam collegiately at Virginia Tech.

== Education ==
Ho studied at Virginia Tech in Blacksburg Virginia. His received his undergraduate degree in mechanical engineering. Ho participated in research in Virginia Tech's DREAMS lab (pictured).

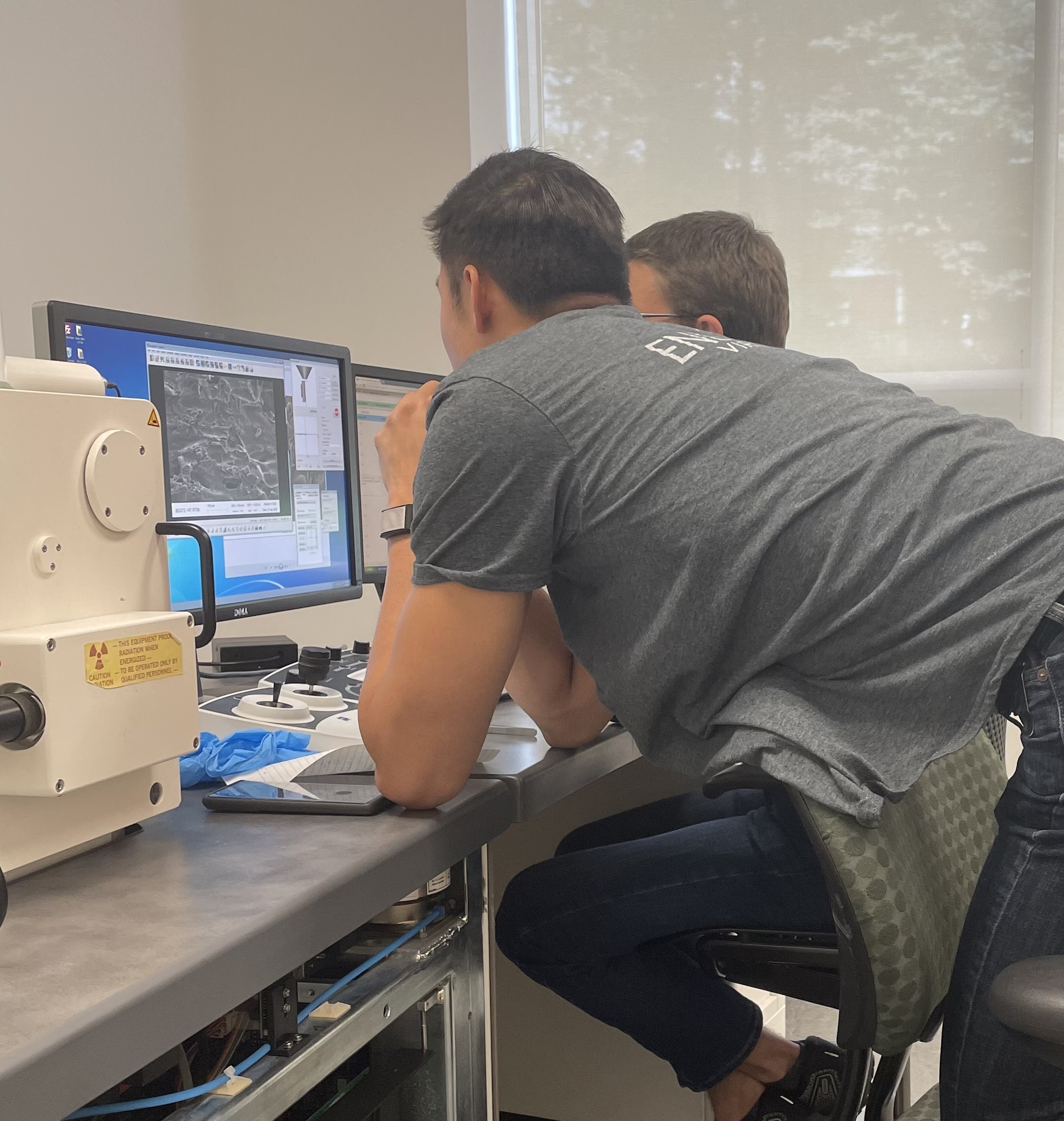
