= Stephanie Au =

Hong Kong swimmer (born 1992)

Stephanie Au 歐鎧淳
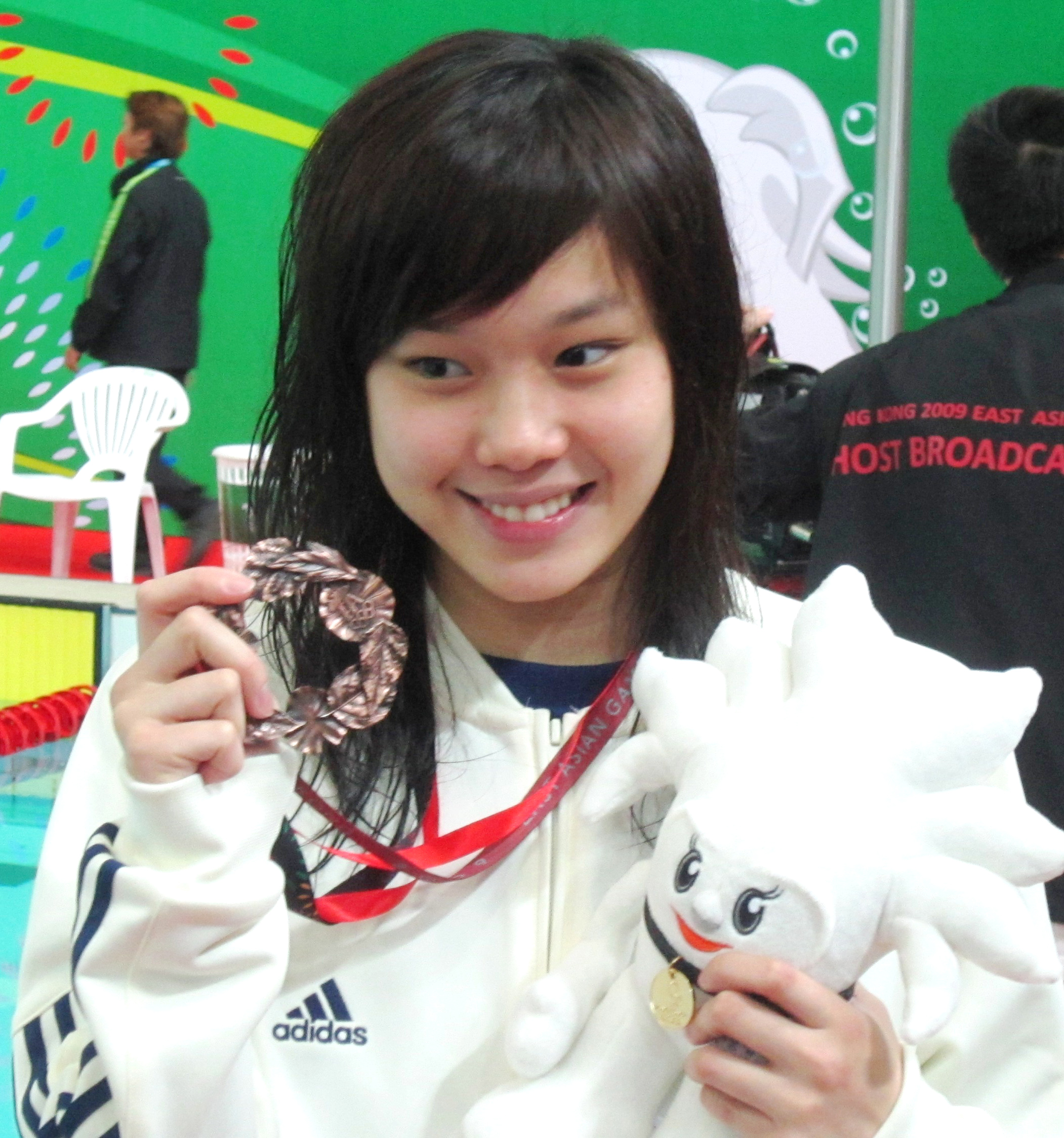
- Stephanie Au at the 2009 East Asian Games

Personal information
- Full name: Stephanie Au Hoi-shun
- National team: Hong Kong
- Born: 30 May 1992 (age 34) Hong Kong
- Height: 1.73 m (5 ft 8 in)
- Weight: 56.5 kg (125 lb)

Sport
- Sport: Swimming
- Strokes: Backstroke, freestyle
- College team: University of California, Berkeley
Medal record
Swimming
Representing Hong Kong
Asian Games
Silver medal – second place	2018 Jakarta	4×100 m medley
Bronze medal – third place	2010 Guangzhou	4×100 m freestyle
Bronze medal – third place	2014 Incheon	4×100 m medley
Bronze medal – third place	2014 Incheon	4×100 m freestyle
Bronze medal – third place	2014 Incheon	4×200 m freestyle
Bronze medal – third place	2018 Jakarta	4×100 m freestyle
Bronze medal – third place	2022 Hangzhou	4×100 m medley
Bronze medal – third place	2022 Hangzhou	4×100 m freestyle
East Asian Games
Silver medal – second place	2009 Hong Kong	4×100 m freestyle
Silver medal – second place	2013 Tianjin	50m Backstroke
Silver medal – second place	2009 Hong Kong	4×200 m freestyle
Bronze medal – third place	2009 Hong Kong	200 m freestyle
Bronze medal – third place	2009 Hong Kong	400 m freestyle
Bronze medal – third place	2013 Tianjin	4×100 m medley
Bronze medal – third place	2013 Tianjin	4×100 m freestyle
Bronze medal – third place	2013 Tianjin	4×200 m freestyle
Summer Universiade
Silver medal – second place	2015 Gwangju	50 m backstroke

Stephanie Au Hoi-shun (Chinese: 歐鎧淳; Jyutping: au^{1} hoi^{2} seon^{4}; born 30 May 1992) is a Hong Kong competitive swimmer. She is a five-time Olympian, having represented Hong Kong at the 2008, 2012, 2016, 2020 and 2024 Summer Olympics. She also represented Hong Kong in five editions of FINA World Aquatics Championships (2013, 2015, 2019, 2022, 2023) and FINA World Swimming Championships (25 m) (2008, 2014, 2018, 2021, 2022) respectively.

Au is the holder of 18 Hong Kong national records, plus former record holder in 8 other events. Currently she holds long course records in the 800 m freestyle, 50m, 100m backstroke, short course records in 800 m and 1500 m freestyle, 50m, 100, 200m backstroke, together with all long course and short course women's relay records (4 × 100 m medley, 4 × 100 m freestyle and 4 × 200 m freestyle relay).

She studied at Sacred Heart Canossian College., and swam for the University of California, Berkeley, from which she graduated with a degree in environmental economics and policy in 2014. She is also a winner of the 24th Hong Kong Outstanding Students Awards.

She represented Hong Kong at the 2020 Summer Olympics held in Tokyo, Japan.

Olympic Games
Preceded by Lee Wai Sze	Flagbearer for Hong Kong; Rio de Janeiro 2016	Succeeded by Ying Suet Tse Cheung Ka Long
