= Swimming at the 2025 World Aquatics Championships – Women's 400 metre individual medley =

Women's 400 metre individual medley at the 2025 World Aquatics Championships
- Venue: World Aquatics Championships Arena
- Location: Singapore Sports Hub, Kallang
- Dates: 3 August
- Competitors: 24 from 18 nations
- Winning time: 4:25.78

Medalists
gold medal	Summer McIntosh	Canada
silver medal	Jenna Forrester	Australia
silver medal	Mio Narita	Japan

The women's 400 metre individual medley event at the 2025 World Aquatics Championships was held on 3 August 2025 at the World Aquatics Championships Arena at the Singapore Sports Hub in Kallang, Singapore.

== Background ==
Summer McIntosh of Canada enters as the Olympic and 2023 World Champion with a world record of 4:23.65 and the three fastest times ever. She leads the 2025 rankings by 10 seconds. Emma Weyant (4:33.95) and Katie Grimes (4:37.22) are the top contenders from the United States, with Weyant showing stronger form this season.

Freya Colbert of Great Britain, the 2024 World Champion, comes in with a season best of 4:34.01. Teammate Abbie Wood, who recently returned to the event, has also been 4:36.66. Australians Ella Ramsay and Jenna Forrester, who finished first and second at the Australian Trials, are separated by 0.07 and both reached the final in Paris. Ireland’s Ellen Walshe and Japan’s Mio Narita are returning Olympic finalists. Both have set new personal bests this year—4:35.32 and 4:35.39, respectively—and are ranked top five globally.

China’s 12-year-old Yu Zidi swam 4:35.53 at the Chinese Nationals. While she lacks international experience, her time places her among the top contenders.

== Qualification ==
Each National Federation was permitted to enter a maximum of two qualified athletes in each individual event, but they could do so only if both of them had attained the "A" standard qualification time. For this event, the "A" standard qualification time was 4:43.06 seconds. Federations could enter one athlete into the event if they met the "B" standard qualification time. For this event, the "B" standard qualification time was 4:52.97 seconds. Athletes could also enter the event if they had met an "A" or "B" standard in a different event and their Federation had not entered anyone else. Additional considerations applied to Federations who had few swimmers enter through the standard qualification times. Federations in this category could at least enter two men and two women to the competition, all of whom could enter into up to two events.

Top 10 fastest qualification times
Swimmer	Country	Time	Competition
Summer McIntosh	Canada	4:23.65	2025 Canadian Swimming Trials
Kaylee McKeown	Australia	4:28.22	2024 Australian Championships
Katie Grimes	United States	4:33.40	2024 Summer Olympics
Emma Weyant	United States	4:33.95	Fort Lauderdale stop of the 2025 TYR Pro Swim Series
Freya Colbert	Great Britain	4:34.01	2024 Great British Championships
Anastasia Gorbenko	Israel	4:34.87	Monaco stop of the 2024 Mare Nostrum Swim Tour
Vivien Jackl	Hungary	4:34.96	2024 Hungarian Championships
Ellen Walshe	Ireland	4:35.32	Fort Lauderdale stop of the 2025 TYR Pro Swim Series
Mio Narita	Japan	4:35.39	2025 Japanese Championships
Zidi Yu	China	4:35.53	2025 Chinese Championships

== Records ==
Prior to the competition, the existing world and championship records were as follows.

World record	Summer McIntosh (CAN)	4:23.65	Victoria, Canada	11 June 2025
Competition record	Summer McIntosh (CAN)	4:27.11	Fukuoka, Japan	30 July 2023

== Heats ==
The heats took place at 10:28.

Rank	Heat	Lane	Swimmer	Nation	Time	Notes
1	3	4	Summer McIntosh	Canada	4:35.56	Q
2	3	7	Jenna Forrester	Australia	4:36.17	Q
3	2	6	Yu Zidi	China	4:36.49	Q
4	2	7	Waka Kobori	Japan	4:36.62	Q
5	3	5	Emma Weyant	United States	4:36.75	Q
6	3	6	Mio Narita	Japan	4:37.12	Q
7	2	4	Katie Grimes	United States	4:38.26	Q
8	2	5	Freya Colbert	Great Britain	4:38.31	Q
9	2	3	Ellen Walshe	Ireland	4:38.72	
10	3	1	Abbie Wood	Great Britain	4:41.73	
11	3	3	Vivien Jackl	Hungary	4:43.02	
12	2	1	Chang Mohan	China	4:43.12	
13	3	9	Emma Carrasco	Spain	4:44.47	
14	3	0	Alba Vázquez	Spain	4:46.01	
15	2	0	Aleksandra Knop	Poland	4:48.12	
16	2	8	Viktória Mihályvári-Farkas	Hungary	4:49.50	
17	3	8	Sara Franceschi	Italy	4:50.23	
18	1	4	Gwinn Applejean	Chinese Taipei	4:51.16	
19	1	5	Kim Bo-min	South Korea	4:51.55	
20	2	9	Kamonchanok Kwanmuang	Thailand	4:53.21	
21	1	3	Artemis Vasilaki	Greece	4:53.27	
22	1	2	Ng Lai Wa	Hong Kong	4:57.66	
23	1	6	Kristen Romano	Puerto Rico	5:04.08	
24	1	7	Inana Soleman	Syria	5:07.52	
	2	2	Ella Ramsay	Australia	Did not start	
	3	2	Mary-Sophie Harvey	Canada	Did not start	

== Final ==
The final took place on 3 August at 20:14.

Rank	Lane	Name	Nationality	Time	Notes
1st place, gold medalist(s)	4	Summer McIntosh	Canada	4:25.78	CR
2nd place, silver medalist(s)	5	Jenna Forrester	Australia	4:33.26	
2nd place, silver medalist(s)	7	Mio Narita	Japan	4:33.26	
4	3	Yu Zidi	China	4:33.76	
5	2	Emma Weyant	United States	4:34.01	
6	1	Katie Grimes	United States	4:36.52	
7	6	Waka Kobori	Japan	4:38.05	
8	8	Freya Colbert	Great Britain	4:40.21	
