= Swimming at the 2023 World Aquatics Championships – Women's 400 metre individual medley =

Women's 400 metre individual medley at the 2023 World Aquatics Championships
- Venue: Marine Messe Fukuoka
- Location: Fukuoka, Japan
- Dates: 30 July (heats and final)
- Competitors: 35 from 26 nations
- Winning time: 4:27.11 CR

Medalists
gold medal	Summer McIntosh	Canada
silver medal	Katie Grimes	United States
bronze medal	Jenna Forrester	Australia

The women's 400 metre individual medley competition at the 2023 World Aquatics Championships was held on 30 July 2023.

== Records ==
Prior to the competition, the existing world and championship records were as follows.

World record	Summer McIntosh (CAN)	4:25.87	Toronto, Canada	1 April 2023
Competition record	Katinka Hosszú (HUN)	4:29.33	Budapest, Hungary	30 July 2017

The following new records were set during this competition.

Date	Event	Name	Nationality	Time	Record
30 July	Final	Summer McIntosh	Canada	4:27.11	CR

== Results ==
=== Heats ===
The heats were held at 10:32.

Rank	Heat	Lane	Name	Nationality	Time	Notes
1	4	5	Jenna Forrester	Australia	4:35.88	Q
2	4	4	Summer McIntosh	Canada	4:36.57	Q
3	4	2	Mio Narita	Japan	4:38.05	Q
4	4	3	Freya Colbert	Great Britain	4:38.29	Q
5	3	4	Katie Grimes	United States	4:38.39	Q
6	4	6	Sara Franceschi	Italy	4:38.89	Q
7	3	5	Alex Walsh	United States	4:39.42	Q
8	3	2	Katie Shanahan	Great Britain	4:39.46	Q
9	3	6	Ageha Tanigawa	Japan	4:40.21	
10	4	1	Viktória Mihályvári-Farkas	Hungary	4:41.28	
11	3	3	Yu Yiting	China	4:41.84	
12	3	1	Ge Chutong	China	4:41.87	
13	4	7	Kiah Melverton	Australia	4:41.96	
14	3	7	Fantine Lesaffre	France	4:42.07	
15	4	9	Alba Vázquez	Spain	4:42.11	
16	3	9	Ellen Walshe	Ireland	4:43.24	
17	4	0	Ella Jansen	Canada	4:43.35	
18	3	8	Zsuzsanna Jakabos	Hungary	4:43.52	
19	2	5	Kim Seo-yeong	South Korea	4:45.04	
20	4	8	Cyrielle Duhamel	France	4:45.32	
21	2	8	Rebecca Meder	South Africa	4:45.68	
22	2	4	Anja Crevar	Serbia	4:46.26	
23	2	0	Kristen Romano	Puerto Rico	4:48.24	
24	2	1	Kamonchanok Kwanmuang	Thailand	4:48.97	
25	2	7	Xiandi Chua	Suspended Member Federation	4:49.13	
26	3	0	Anastasia Gorbenko	Israel	4:49.64	
27	2	6	Gabrielle Roncatto	Brazil	4:49.73	
28	2	3	Emma Carrasco	Spain	4:50.83	
29	2	2	Florencia Perotti	Argentina	4:52.48	
30	1	4	Lucero Mejia Arce	Guatemala	5:03.52	
31	2	9	Nicole Frank	Uruguay	5:04.07	
32	1	3	Chloe Cheng	Hong Kong	5:05.72	
33	1	2	Vivian Xhemollari	Albania	5:11.38	
34	1	5	Samantha van Vuure	Curaçao	5:32.86	
35	1	6	Meral Latheef	Maldives	6:23.04	

=== Final ===
The final was held at 21:01.

Rank	Lane	Name	Nationality	Time	Notes
1st place, gold medalist(s)	5	Summer McIntosh	Canada	4:27.11	CR
2nd place, silver medalist(s)	2	Katie Grimes	United States	4:31.41	
3rd place, bronze medalist(s)	4	Jenna Forrester	Australia	4:32.30	
4	1	Alex Walsh	United States	4:34.46	
5	6	Freya Colbert	Great Britain	4:35.28	
6	7	Sara Franceschi	Italy	4:37.73	
7	8	Katie Shanahan	Great Britain	4:41.29	
8	3	Mio Narita	Japan	4:42.14	
