= 2026 Pan Pacific Swimming Championships – Women's 400 metre individual medley =

Women's 400 metre individual medley at the 2026 Pan Pacific Swimming Championships
- Venue: William Woollett Jr. Aquatics Center
- Dates: August 13
- Competitors: 18 from 7 nations
- Winning time: 4:28.01 CR

Medalists
gold medal	Summer McIntosh	Canada
silver medal	Jenna Forrester	Australia
bronze medal	Agostina Hein	Argentina

Official Video (heats)

Official Video (B and A final)

The women's 400 metre individual medley event at the 2026 Pan Pacific Swimming Championships was held on August 13 at the William Woollett Jr. Aquatics Center in Irvine, California. The event was won by reigning Olympic champion and world record holder Summer McIntosh of Canada in a championship record time of 4:28.01, breaking the previous record of 4:31.99 set by American Elizabeth Beisel at the 2014 championships. Australia's Jenna Forrester, the reigning Commonwealth Games champion, claimed the silver medal in 4:31.50, finishing 3.49 seconds behind McIntosh, while Argentina's Agostina Hein, the world junior champion, won the bronze medal in a national and South American record time of 4:32.54. China's Yu Yiting finished fourth in 4:33.09, ahead of American Alex Walsh in fifth place with 4:33.73.

== Competition format ==
The Pan Pacific Swimming Championships is a long course swimming event first held in 1985. It was established as an alternative to the European Championships and is open to nations that are not members of European Aquatics. The event consisted of preliminary heats followed by an A final and a B final, with no semifinals contested. Under the championship regulations, each nation could enter an unlimited number of swimmers in the preliminary heats. However, only the two fastest eligible swimmers from each nation could advance to the A final, following any withdrawals. Each nation could also qualify up to two additional swimmers for the B final, regardless of whether it had one or two representatives in the A final. Consequently, a maximum of four swimmers per nation could compete across both finals. The eight A finalists contested the medals and championship points, while the B final determined the remaining eligible finishing positions.

== Race summary ==
A total of 18 swimmers from seven nations entered the event. The morning heats were led by Argentina's Agostina Hein, who recorded the fastest qualifying time of 4:35.43, narrowly ahead of Jenna Forrester of Australia in 4:35.45 and Canadian Summer McIntosh in 4:35.56. The American contingent included six swimmers, with Katie Grimes and Alex Walsh qualifying for the A final in fourth and fifth place overall, respectively. Despite recording the sixth-fastest time of 4:37.04, Emma Weyant was assigned to the B final under the two-swimmers-per-nation restriction, alongside fellow American Leah Hayes, who qualified ninth overall in 4:38.97. Caroline Bricker finished 13th in 4:43.70 but did not advance to either final. Canada's Emma Finlin did not start her heat, while American Becca Mann was disqualified for failing to touch the wall while on her back at the completion of the backstroke leg. In the evening session, China's Yang Peiqi won the B final in 4:36.73, ahead of Hayes in 4:37.26 and Australia's Tara Kinder in 4:38.69.

After placing third in the heats and finishing second in the 200 metre freestyle on the opening night of the championships, McIntosh entered the A final seeking her first individual gold medal of the meet. She established an early lead with a butterfly split of 59.11 seconds and reached the halfway mark in 2:06.61, with Forrester emerging as her closest challenger. McIntosh maintained her advantage through the breaststroke and freestyle legs to win in 4:28.01, lowering Beisel's championship record by 3.98 seconds.

Her performance was the tenth-fastest women's 400 metre individual medley time in history, with eight of the nine faster performances also belonging to McIntosh. The remaining performance was Katinka Hosszú's 4:26.36 at the 2016 Summer Olympics. McIntosh remained unbeaten in international championship finals in the event, having previously won Olympic gold in Paris and three long-course world titles. Forrester finished second in 4:31.50, adding to her victory at the 2026 Commonwealth Games and her previous podium finishes in the event at the 2023 and 2025 World Aquatics Championships. Hein secured the bronze medal in 4:32.54, overtaking China's Yu Yiting on the final 50-metre freestyle leg with a split of 29.84 seconds to establish new Argentine and South American records. Walsh was the highest-placed American in fifth, followed by Grimes in sixth with 4:35.67. The victory marked a return to winning form for McIntosh after her narrow defeat by Australia's Lani Pallister in the 200 metre freestyle the previous evening. Despite breaking the championship record, McIntosh expressed disappointment with her winning time, which was 4.36 seconds slower than her own world record of 4:23.65. She also noted the challenges of competing in an outdoor pool, particularly during the backstroke leg.

== Records ==
Prior to this competition, the existing records were as follows:

Records before the 2026 Pan Pacific Swimming Championships
Record	Time	Athlete (nation)	Meet	Location	Date	Ref
World record	4:23.65	Summer McIntosh (CAN)	2025 Canadian Trials	Victoria, Canada	June 11, 2025	
Championship record	4:31.99	Elizabeth Beisel (USA)	2014 Pan Pacs	Gold Coast, Australia	August 22, 2014	

== Schedule ==
The schedule was as follows:

All times are Pacific Daylight Time (UTC-7)

Date	Time	Round
Thursday, August 13, 2026	10:00	Heats
Thursday, August 13, 2026	19:01	Finals

== Results ==
=== Heats ===
The heats were held at 10:00 on August 13, 2026.

Heat results
Rank	Heat	Lane	Swimmer	Nation	Time	Notes
1	2	3	Agostina Hein	Argentina	4:35.43	QA
2	3	5	Jenna Forrester	Australia	4:35.45	QA
3	3	4	Summer McIntosh	Canada	4:35.56	QA
4	2	4	Katie Grimes	United States	4:35.72	QA
5	3	6	Alex Walsh	United States	4:36.11	QA
6	2	5	Emma Weyant	United States	4:37.04	QB
7	2	6	Yu Yiting	China	4:37.74	QA
8	3	3	Mio Narita	Japan	4:37.96	QA
9	3	2	Leah Hayes	United States	4:38.97	QB
10	2	2	Waka Kobori	Japan	4:40.18	QA
11	2	1	Yang Peiqi	China	4:41.09	QB
12	3	7	Tara Kinder	Australia	4:43.26	QB
13	2	7	Caroline Bricker	United States	4:43.70	
14	3	1	Misa Okuzono	Japan	4:49.23	QB
15	1	4	Elizabeth Dekkers	Australia	4:52.36	QB
16	1	3	Stephanie Iannaccone	Guatemala	4:53.90	QB
	3	8	Emma Finlin	Canada	DNS	
	1	5	Becca Mann	United States	DSQ	

=== B Final ===
The B final was held at 19:01 on August 13, 2026.

B Final results
Rank	Lane	Swimmer	Nation	Time	Notes
9	3	Yang Peiqi	China	4:36.73	
10	5	Leah Hayes	United States	4:37.26	
11	6	Tara Kinder	Australia	4:38.69	
12	4	Emma Weyant	United States	4:38.94	
13	2	Misa Okuzono	Japan	4:46.32	
14	7	Elizabeth Dekkers	Australia	4:50.94	
15	1	Stephanie Iannaccone	Guatemala	4:55.56	

=== A Final ===
The A final was held after the B final on August 13, 2026.

A Final results
Rank	Lane	Swimmer	Nation	Time	Points (Note: A team trophy was awarded to the nation scoring the most points. In individual events, points were awarded on a 9–7–6–5–4–3–2–1 basis for first through eighth place in the A final.)	Notes
1st place, gold medalist(s)	3	Summer McIntosh	Canada	4:28.01	9	CR
2nd place, silver medalist(s)	5	Jenna Forrester	Australia	4:31.50	7	
3rd place, bronze medalist(s)	4	Agostina Hein	Argentina	4:32.54	6	SAR, NR
4	7	Yu Yiting	China	4:33.09	5	
5	2	Alex Walsh	United States	4:33.73	4	
6	6	Katie Grimes	United States	4:35.67	3	
7	8	Waka Kobori	Japan	4:39.23	2	
8	1	Mio Narita	Japan	4:39.49	1	
