= Swimming at the 2024 Summer Olympics – Women's 400-metre individual medley =

Women's 400-metre individual medley at the Games of the XXXIII Olympiad
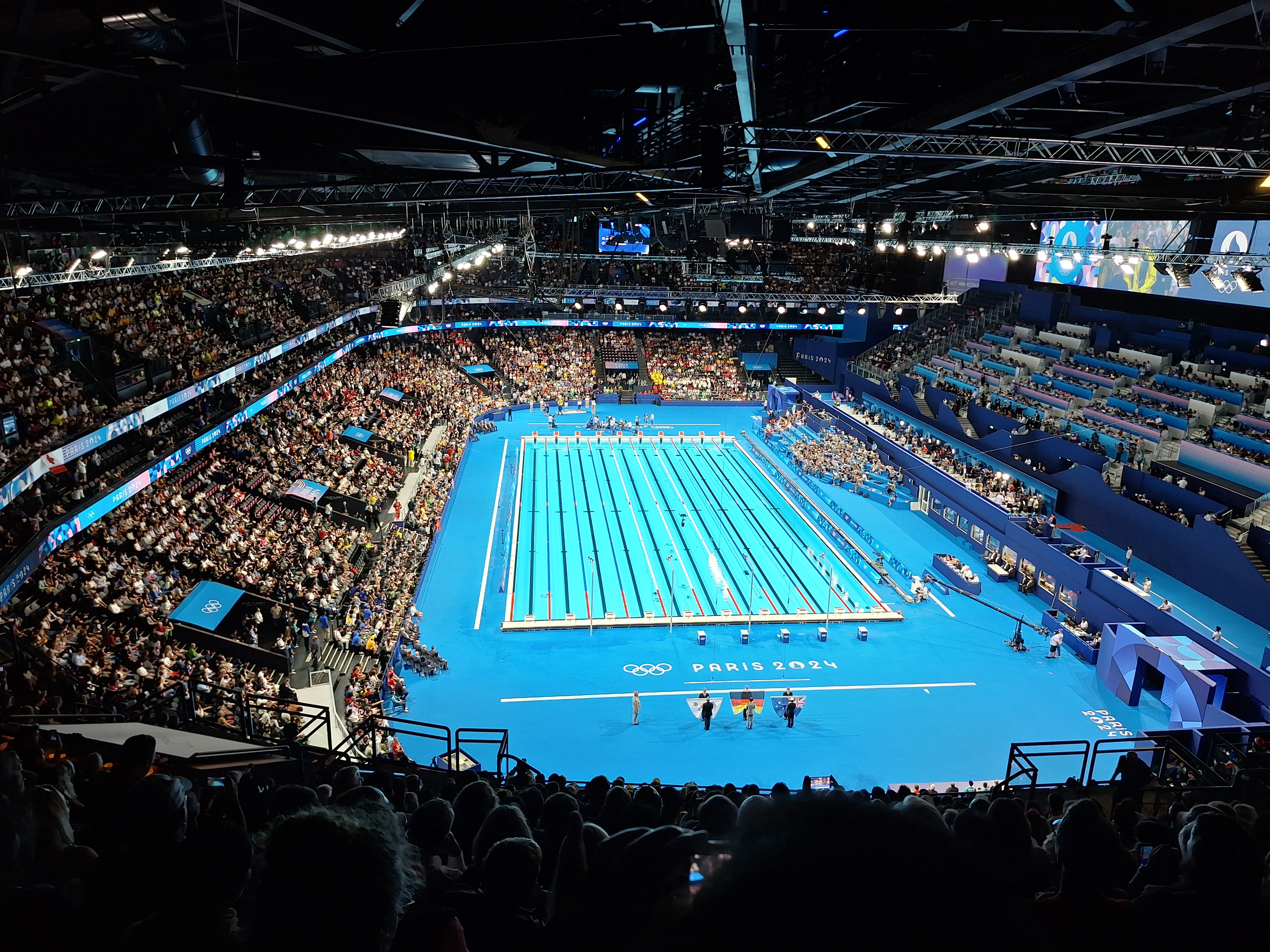
- Paris La Défense Arena after it was converted to a swimming pool for the swimming events
- Venue: Paris La Défense Arena
- Dates: 29 July 2024 (Heats and Final)
- Competitors: 16 from 11 nations
- Winning time: 4:27.71

Medalists
1st place, gold medalist(s)		Summer McIntosh	Canada
2nd place, silver medalist(s)		Katie Grimes	United States
3rd place, bronze medalist(s)		Emma Weyant	United States

The women's 400-metre individual medley event at the 2024 Summer Olympics was held on 29 July 2024 at Paris La Défense Arena, which was converted to a swimming pool for the swimming events.

Canadian Summer McIntosh was the heavy favourite going into the event and ended up winning the race by over five seconds. Katie Grimes and Emma Weyant, both from the US, took second and third, respectively. McIntosh's victory secured Canada's first-ever gold medal in the event.

== Background ==
Canadian Summer McIntosh won the event at the 2022 and 2023 World Championships, broke the world record in 2023 and 2024 and had a personal best over 7 seconds faster than anyone else entered into the competition. SwimSwam opined that she was "perhaps the heaviest favorite among all the individual events", and Swimming World also predicted she would win. Other contenders were the 2022 and 2023 World Championships silver medallist Katie Grimes of the US, and 2024 World Championships winner Freya Colbert of the Great Britain. (Note: McIntosh and Grimes were not present at the 2024 Championships.) Tokyo's Olympic champion Yui Ohashi failed to qualify. Both McIntosh and Grimes were 17 years old at the time of the event.

The event was held at Paris La Défense Arena, which was converted to a swimming pool for the swimming events.

== Qualification ==
Each National Olympic Committee (NOC) was permitted to enter a maximum of two qualified athletes in each individual event, but only if both of them had attained the Olympic Qualifying Time (OQT). For this event, the OQT was 4:38.53. World Aquatics then considered athletes qualifying through universality; NOCs were given one event entry for each gender, which could be used by any athlete regardless of qualification time, providing the spaces had not already been taken by athletes from that nation who had achieved the OQT. Finally, the rest of the spaces were filled by athletes who had met the Olympic Consideration Time (OCT), which was 4:39.92 for this event. In total, 15 athletes qualified through achieving the OQT, no athletes qualified through universality places and one athlete qualified through achieving the OCT.

Top 10 fastest qualification times
Swimmer	Country	Time	Competition
Summer McIntosh	Canada	04:24:38	2024 Canadian Olympic Trials
Katie Grimes	United States	04:31:41	2023 World Aquatics Championships
Jenna Forrester	Australia	04:32:30	2023 World Aquatics Championships
Freya Colbert	Great Britain	04:34:01	2024 Aquatics GB Swimming Championships
Anastasia Gorbenko	Israel	04:34:87	2024 Mare Nostrum Monte Carlo
Vivien Jackl	Hungary	04:34:96	2024 Hungarian Championships
Mio Narita	Japan	04:35:40	2024 Japanese Olympic Trials
Emma Weyant	United States	04:35:56	2024 United States Olympic Trials
Ageha Tanigawa	Japan	04:35:60	2024 Japanese Olympic Trials
Sara Franceschi	Italy	04:35:98	2023 Italian Championships

== Heats ==
Two heats (preliminary rounds) took place on 29 July 2024, starting at 11:00. (Note: All times are Central European Summer Time (UTC+2)) The swimmers with the best eight times in the heats advanced to the final. Emma Weyant of the US won the first heat and McIntosh won the second. The qualifying time was three seconds slower than it was at the Tokyo Olympics.

Results
Rank	Heat	Lane	Swimmer	Nation	Time	Notes
1	1	6	Emma Weyant	United States	4:36.27	Q
2	1	4	Katie Grimes	United States	4:37.24	Q
3	2	4	Summer McIntosh	Canada	4:37.35	Q
4	1	5	Freya Colbert	Great Britain	4:37.62	Q
5	2	6	Mio Narita	Japan	4:37.84	Q
6	2	7	Ella Ramsay	Australia	4:39.04	Q
7	2	1	Ellen Walshe	Ireland	4:39.97	Q
8	1	7	Katie Shanahan	Great Britain	4:40.40	Q
9	2	5	Jenna Forrester	Australia	4:40.55	
10	2	3	Anastasia Gorbenko	Israel	4:41.64	
11	1	1	Ella Jansen	Canada	4:42.06	
12	2	8	Emma Carrasco	Spain	4:43.13	
13	2	2	Ageha Tanigawa	Japan	4:43.18	
14	1	3	Vivien Jackl	Hungary	4:44.47	
15	1	2	Sara Franceschi	Italy	4:48.89	
16	1	8	Anja Crevar	Serbia	4:49.16	

== Final ==
The final took place at 20:30 on 29 July. Canadian Summer McIntosh led from beginning to end, swimming ahead of the world record until 200 m and finishing over five seconds ahead of second place with a time of 4:27.71. The US' Katie Grimes also retained second place from start to finish, while Emma Weyant of the US progressed from fifth to third over the final 200 m to claim bronze. McIntosh's victory secured Canada's first-ever gold medal in the event. In the post race data analysis, Dominique Hérailh of SwimSwam opined that McIntosh still had room for improvement in the breaststroke and underwaters.

Results
Rank	Lane	Swimmer	Nation	Time	Notes
1st place, gold medalist(s)	3	Summer McIntosh	Canada	4:27.71	
2nd place, silver medalist(s)	5	Katie Grimes	United States	4:33.40	
3rd place, bronze medalist(s)	4	Emma Weyant	United States	4:34.93	
4	6	Freya Colbert	Great Britain	4:35.67	
5	7	Ella Ramsay	Australia	4:38.01	
6	2	Mio Narita	Japan	4:38.83	
7	8	Katie Shanahan	Great Britain	4:40.17	
8	1	Ellen Walshe	Ireland	4:40.70	

Statistics
Name	100 metre split	200 metre split	300 metre split	Time	Stroke rate (strokes/min)
Summer McIntosh	00:58.50	02:05.59	03:24.95	4:27.71	43.8
Katie Grimes	00:59.85	02:07.15	03:29.91	4:33.40	41.3
Emma Weyant	01:02.78	02:14.14	03:32.73	4:34.93	43.6
Freya Colbert	01:02.58	02:11.88	03:32.52	4:35.67	42.5
Ella Ramsay	01:02.79	02:14.66	03:32.96	4:38.01	40.4
Mio Narita	01:03.32	02:16.28	03:36.96	4:38.83	39.7
Katie Shanahan	01:03.38	02:12.75	03:33.85	4:40.17	37.6
Ellen Walshe	01:03.71	02:16.17	03:35.59	4:40.70	38.7
