= Swimming at the 2022 European Aquatics Championships – Women's 200 metre individual medley =

Women's 200 metre individual medley at the 2022 European Aquatics Championships
- Venue: Foro Italico
- Dates: 15 August (heats and semifinals); 16 August (final)
- Competitors: 27 from 20 nations
- Winning time: 2:10.92

Medalists
gold medal	Anastasia Gorbenko	Israel
silver medal	Marrit Steenbergen	Netherlands
bronze medal	Sara Franceschi	Italy

The Women's 200 metre individual medley competition of the 2022 European Aquatics Championships will be held on 15 and 16 August 2022.

== Records ==
Prior to the competition, the existing world, European and championship records were as follows.

	Name	Nationality	Time	Location	Date
World record European record	Katinka Hosszú	Hungary	2:06.12	Kazan	3 August 2015
Championship record	Katinka Hosszú	Hungary	2:07.30	London	19 May 2016

== Results ==
=== Heats ===
The heats were started on 15 August at 09:49.

Rank	Heat	Lane	Name	Nationality	Time	Notes
1	2	4	Anastasia Gorbenko	Israel	2:13.12	Q
2	3	5	Katinka Hosszú	Hungary	2:13.58	Q
3	3	4	Sara Franceschi	Italy	2:13.79	Q
4	3	3	Kristýna Horská	Czech Republic	2:14.36	Q
5	1	4	Maria Ugolkova	Switzerland	2:14.39	Q
6	3	6	Katie Shanahan	Great Britain	2:14.51	Q
7	3	7	Lena Kreundl	Austria	2:14.97	Q
8	2	5	Marrit Steenbergen	Netherlands	2:15.05	Q
9	1	3	Zoe Vogelmann	Germany	2:15.08	Q
10	1	5	Dalma Sebestyén	Hungary	2:15.11	Q
11	2	2	Mireia Belmonte	Spain	2:15.91	Q
12	1	2	Lisa Nystrand	Sweden	2:16.46	Q
13	2	8	Zinke Delcommune	Belgium	2:16.56	Q
14	3	2	Freya Colbert	Great Britain	2:16.77	Q
15	1	7	Francesca Fresia	Italy	2:16.84	Q
16	2	6	Alba Vázquez	Spain	2:16.89	Q
17	2	3	Lea Polonsky	Israel	2:16.98	
18	2	7	Hanna Bergman	Sweden	2:17.20	
18	3	1	Nikoleta Trníková	Slovakia	2:17.20	
20	1	1	Ieva Maļuka	Latvia	2:18.14	
21	3	0	Maria Romanjuk	Estonia	2:18.40	
22	3	8	Ambre Franquinet	Belgium	2:18.66	
23	2	1	Clara Rybak-Andersen	Denmark	2:18.69	
24	1	0	Ellie McCartney	Ireland	2:19.70	
25	2	0	Wiktoria Guść	Poland	2:22.75	
26	3	9	Amy Micallef	Malta	2:29.31	
	1	8	Alexandra Dobrin	Romania	Disqualified	
	1	6	Charlotte Bonnet	France	Did not start	

=== Semifinals ===
The semifinals were started at 19:07.

Rank	Heat	Lane	Name	Nationality	Time	Notes
1	1	3	Katie Shanahan	Great Britain	2:11.84	Q
2	1	6	Marrit Steenbergen	Netherlands	2:12.31	Q
3	2	5	Katinka Hosszú	Hungary	2:12.52	Q
4	1	4	Sara Franceschi	Italy	2:12.76	q
5	2	4	Anastasia Gorbenko	Israel	2:12.91	Q
6	2	3	Maria Ugolkova	Switzerland	2:12.92	q
7	1	5	Kristýna Horská	Czech Republic	2:12.99	q
8	1	2	Dalma Sebestyén	Hungary	2:13.26	q
9	1	1	Freya Colbert	Great Britain	2:13.65	
10	1	7	Lisa Nystrand	Sweden	2:14.64	
11	1	8	Alba Vázquez	Spain	2:15.27	
12	2	2	Zoe Vogelmann	Germany	2:15.34	
13	2	6	Lena Kreundl	Austria	2:15.37	
14	2	7	Mireia Belmonte	Spain	2:15.47	
15	2	8	Francesca Fresia	Italy	2:16.37	
16	2	1	Zinke Delcommune	Belgium	2:17.02	

=== Final ===
The final was held on 16 August at 18:17.

Rank	Lane	Name	Nationality	Time	Notes
1st place, gold medalist(s)	2	Anastasia Gorbenko	Israel	2:10.92	
2nd place, silver medalist(s)	5	Marrit Steenbergen	Netherlands	2:11.14	
3rd place, bronze medalist(s)	6	Sara Franceschi	Italy	2:11.38	
4	4	Katie Shanahan	Great Britain	2:12.29	
5	1	Kristýna Horská	Czech Republic	2:12.49	
6	7	Maria Ugolkova	Switzerland	2:12.56	
7	8	Dalma Sebestyén	Hungary	2:13.45	
8	3	Katinka Hosszú	Hungary	2:14.37	
