= Swimming at the 2020 European Aquatics Championships – Women's 200 metre individual medley =

Women's 200 metre individual medley at the 2020 European Aquatics Championships
- Venue: Danube Arena
- Dates: 21 May 2021 (heats and semifinals); 22 May 2021 (final)
- Competitors: 40 from 25 nations
- Winning time: 2:09.99

Medalists
gold medal	Anastasia Gorbenko	Israel
silver medal	Abbie Wood	Great Britain
bronze medal	Katinka Hosszú	Hungary

The Women's 200 metre individual medley (50 m) competition of the 2020 European Aquatics Championships was held on 21 and 22 May 2021.

== Records ==
Prior to the competition, the existing world, European and championship records were as follows.

	Name	Nationality	Time	Location	Date
World record European record	Katinka Hosszú	Hungary	2:06.12	Kazan	3 August 2015
Championship record	Katinka Hosszú	Hungary	2:07.30	London	19 May 2016

== Results ==
=== Heats ===
The heats were started on 21 May 2021 at 10:27.

Rank	Heat	Lane	Name	Nationality	Time	Notes
1	4	4	Abbie Wood	Great Britain	2:11.07	Q
2	5	4	Katinka Hosszú	Hungary	2:11.57	Q
3	4	5	Sara Franceschi	Italy	2:11.78	Q
4	5	6	Dalma Sebestyén	Hungary	2:11.87	Q
5	5	5	Maria Ugolkova	Switzerland	2:12.09	Q
6	3	2	Cyrielle Duhamel	France	2:12.35	Q
7	5	3	Anastasia Gorbenko	Israel	2:12.61	Q
8	5	2	Aimee Willmott	Great Britain	2:12.68	Q
9	4	7	África Zamorano	Spain	2:12.85	Q
10	4	6	Viktoriya Zeynep Güneş	Turkey	2:12.93	Q
11	3	5	Ilaria Cusinato	Italy	2:13.24	Q
12	4	0	Diana Petkova	Bulgaria	2:13.35	Q, NR
13	3	3	Kathrin Demler	Germany	2:13.38	Q
14	3	7	Réka György	Hungary	2:13.58	
15	3	4	Alicia Wilson	Great Britain	2:13.63	
16	4	1	Katie Shanahan	Great Britain	2:13.77	
17	4	3	Zoe Vogelmann	Germany	2:14.23	Q
18	4	8	Maria Temnikova	Russia	2:14.29	Q
19	4	2	Catalina Corró	Spain	2:14.63	Q
20	5	8	Kim Herkle	Germany	2:14.75	
21	3	6	Kristýna Horská	Czech Republic	2:14.99	
22	3	8	Giulia Goerigk	Germany	2:15.31	
23	5	7	Alba Vázquez	Spain	2:15.36	
24	5	0	Marrit Steenbergen	Netherlands	2:15.67	
25	5	9	Jenna Laukkanen	Finland	2:16.30	
26	4	9	Lisa Nystrand	Sweden	2:16.34	
27	2	4	Clara Rybak-Andersen	Denmark	2:16.64	
28	3	1	Victoria Kaminskaya	Portugal	2:16.72	
29	5	1	Lena Kreundl	Austria	2:16.95	
30	2	6	Raquel Pereira	Portugal	2:17.16	
31	2	1	Maria Romanjuk	Estonia	2:17.78	NR
32	2	5	Nikoleta Trníková	Slovakia	2:18.09	
33	2	3	Josephine Dumont	Belgium	2:19.94	
34	2	7	Sudem Denizli	Turkey	2:20.93	
35	2	2	Amina Kajtaz	Bosnia and Herzegovina	2:21.68	
36	2	8	Mya Azzopardi	Malta	2:22.87	
37	3	0	Malene Rypestøl	Norway	2:23.78	
38	1	5	Martta Ruuska	Finland	2:24.23	
39	1	4	Iman Avdić	Bosnia and Herzegovina	2:24.32	
40	1	3	Jona Beqiri	Kosovo	2:34.37	
	3	9	Panna Ugrai	Hungary	Did not start	

=== Semifinals ===
The semifinals were started on 21 May 2021 at 19:37.

==== Semifinal 1 ====
Rank	Lane	Name	Nationality	Time	Notes
1	4	Katinka Hosszú	Hungary	2:10.66	Q
2	3	Cyrielle Duhamel	France	2:12.12	Q
3	5	Dalma Sebestyén	Hungary	2:12.34	q
4	7	Diana Petkova	Bulgaria	2:12.38	NR
5	6	Aimee Willmott	Great Britain	2:12.42	
6	2	Viktoriya Zeynep Güneş	Turkey	2:12.79	
7	1	Zoe Vogelmann	Germany	2:14.39	
8	8	Catalina Corró	Spain	2:16.04	

==== Semifinal 2 ====
Rank	Lane	Name	Nationality	Time	Notes
1	6	Anastasia Gorbenko	Israel	2:10.35	Q, NR
2	7	Ilaria Cusinato	Italy	2:10.72	Q
3	3	Maria Ugolkova	Switzerland	2:10.76	q
4	4	Abbie Wood	Great Britain	2:10.81	q
5	5	Sara Franceschi	Italy	2:11.41	q
6	2	África Zamorano	Spain	2:12.80	
7	1	Kathrin Demler	Germany	2:13.49	
8	8	Maria Temnikova	Russia	2:14.84	

=== Final ===
The final was held on 22 May at 19:24.

Rank	Lane	Name	Nationality	Time	Notes
1st place, gold medalist(s)	4	Anastasia Gorbenko	Israel	2:09.99	NR
2nd place, silver medalist(s)	2	Abbie Wood	Great Britain	2:10.03	
3rd place, bronze medalist(s)	5	Katinka Hosszú	Hungary	2:10.12	
4	7	Sara Franceschi	Italy	2:10.65	
5	6	Maria Ugolkova	Switzerland	2:10.76	
6	3	Ilaria Cusinato	Italy	2:11.70	
7	8	Dalma Sebestyén	Hungary	2:12.42	
8	1	Cyrielle Duhamel	France	2:13.22	
