= Swimming at the 2022 European Aquatics Championships – Women's 400 metre individual medley =

Women's 400 metre individual medley at the 2022 European Aquatics Championships
- Venue: Foro Italico
- Dates: 13 August
- Competitors: 18 from 11 nations
- Winning time: 4:37.56

Medalists
gold medal	Viktória Mihályvári-Farkas	Hungary
silver medal	Zsuzsanna Jakabos	Hungary
bronze medal	Freya Colbert	Great Britain

The Women's 400 metre individual medley competition of the 2022 European Aquatics Championships was held on 13 August 2022.

== Records ==
Prior to the competition, the existing world, European and championship records were as follows.

	Name	Nationality	Time	Location	Date
World record European record	Katinka Hosszú	Hungary	4:26.36	Rio de Janeiro	6 August 2016
Championship record	Katinka Hosszú	Hungary	4:30.90	London	16 May 2016

== Results ==
=== Heats ===
The heats were started at 10:02

Rank	Heat	Lane	Name	Nationality	Time	Notes
1	2	5	Viktória Mihályvári-Farkas	Hungary	4:41.01	Q
2	1	3	Zsuzsanna Jakabos	Hungary	4:41.30	Q
3	1	5	Ilaria Cusinato	Italy	4:44.89	Q
4	2	4	Katinka Hosszú	Hungary	4:45.07	
5	2	3	Sara Franceschi	Italy	4:45.55	Q
6	2	6	Freya Colbert	Great Britain	4:46.39	Q
7	1	2	Alba Vázquez	Spain	4:46.72	Q
8	2	2	Katie Shanahan	Great Britain	4:47.30	Q
9	1	6	Zoe Vogelmann	Germany	4:48.03	Q
10	1	4	Mireia Belmonte	Spain	4:48.18	
11	1	8	Nikoleta Trníková	Slovakia	4:49.41	
12	2	8	Lisa Nystrand	Sweden	4:50.40	
13	2	7	Francesca Fresia	Italy	4:50.88	
14	1	1	Alexandra Dobrin	Romania	4:51.17	
15	1	7	Giulia Goerigk	Germany	4:51.68	
16	2	1	Lea Polonsky	Israel	4:53.35	
17	2	0	Ambre Franquinet	Belgium	4:55.74	
18	2	9	Ieva Maļuka	Latvia	4:59.02	
	1	0	Réka Nyirádi	Hungary	Did not start	

=== Final ===
The final was held at 19:28.

Rank	Lane	Name	Nationality	Time	Notes
1st place, gold medalist(s)	4	Viktória Mihályvári-Farkas	Hungary	4:37.56	
2nd place, silver medalist(s)	5	Zsuzsanna Jakabos	Hungary	4:39.79	
3rd place, bronze medalist(s)	2	Freya Colbert	Great Britain	4:40.06	
4	6	Sara Franceschi	Italy	4:40.91	
5	7	Alba Vázquez	Spain	4:42.40	
6	3	Ilaria Cusinato	Italy	4:44.24	
7	1	Katie Shanahan	Great Britain	4:49.38	
7	8	Zoe Vogelmann	Germany	4:49.38	
