= Swimming at the 2024 European Aquatics Championships – Women's 400 metre individual medley =

Women's 400 metre individual medley at the 2024 European Aquatics Championships
- Venue: Sports Centre Milan Gale Muškatirović
- Dates: 19 June
- Competitors: 15 from 9 nations
- Winning time: 4:36.05

Medalists
| gold medal | Anastasia Gorbenko | Israel |
| silver medal | Vivien Jackl | Hungary |
| bronze medal | Zsuzsanna Jakabos | Hungary |

The Women's 400 metre individual medley competition of the 2024 European Aquatics Championships was held on 19 June 2024.

== Records ==
Prior to the competition, the existing world, European and championship records were as follows.

| | Name | Nation | Time | Location | Date |
|---|---|---|---|---|---|
| World record | Summer McIntosh | Canada | 4:24.38 | Toronto | 16 May 2024 |
| European record | Katinka Hosszú | Hungary | 4:26.36 | Rio de Janeiro | 6 August 2016 |
| Championship record | Katinka Hosszú | Hungary | 4:30.90 | London | 16 May 2016 |

== Results ==
=== Heats ===
The heats were started at 10:22.

| Rank | Heat | Lane | Name | Nationality | Time | Notes |
|---|---|---|---|---|---|---|
| 1 | 1 | 4 | Vivien Jackl | Hungary | 4:39.30 | Q |
| 2 | 1 | 3 | Zsuzsanna Jakabos | Hungary | 4:41.31 | Q |
| 3 | 1 | 5 | Viktória Mihályvári-Farkas | Hungary | 4:43.34 | |
| 4 | 2 | 4 | Anastasia Gorbenko | Israel | 4:43.84 | Q |
| 5 | 2 | 5 | Boglárka Kapás | Hungary | 4:45.32 | |
| 6 | 2 | 3 | Anja Crevar | Serbia | 4:47.78 | Q |
| 7 | 1 | 6 | Lisa Nystrand | Sweden | 4:48.01 | Q |
| 8 | 1 | 2 | Ada Hakkarainen | Finland | 4:49.84 | Q |
| 9 | 2 | 2 | Louna Kasvio | Finland | 4:51.17 | Q |
| 10 | 2 | 6 | Aleksandra Knop | Poland | 4:53.21 | Q |
| 11 | 2 | 1 | Tea Winblad | Sweden | 4:56.60 | |
| 12 | 1 | 1 | Olivia Šprláková-Zmorová | Slovakia | 4:57.98 | |
| 13 | 2 | 7 | Annie Hegmegi | Sweden | 5:01.45 | |
| 14 | 1 | 7 | Iman Avdić | Bosnia and Herzegovina | 5:09.90 | |
| | 2 | 8 | Vivian Xhemollari | Albania | Disqualified | |

=== Final ===
The final was held at 19:58.

| Rank | Lane | Name | Nationality | Time | Notes |
|---|---|---|---|---|---|
| 1st place, gold medalist(s) | 3 | Anastasia Gorbenko | Israel | 4:36.05 | |
| 2nd place, silver medalist(s) | 4 | Vivien Jackl | Hungary | 4:38.96 | |
| 3rd place, bronze medalist(s) | 5 | Zsuzsanna Jakabos | Hungary | 4:40.24 | |
| 4 | 6 | Anja Crevar | Serbia | 4:46.23 | |
| 5 | 2 | Lisa Nystrand | Sweden | 4:18.15 | |
| 6 | 1 | Louna Kasvio | Finland | 4:52.77 | |
| 7 | 7 | Ada Hakkarainen | Finland | 4:55.12 | |
| | 8 | Aleksandra Knop | Poland | Disqualified | |
