= Swimming at the 2018 Summer Youth Olympics – Girls' 200 metre individual medley =

Girls' 200 metre individual medley at the 2018 Summer Youth Olympics
- Venue: Natatorium
- Dates: 7 October
- Competitors: 31 from 29 nations
- Winning time: 2:12.88

Medalists
gold medal	Anastasia Gorbenko	Israel
silver medal	Anja Crevar	Serbia
bronze medal	Cyrielle Duhamel	France

The girls' 200 metre individual medley event at the 2018 Summer Youth Olympics took place on 7 October at the Natatorium in Buenos Aires, Argentina.

== Results ==
=== Heats ===
The heats were started at 11:11.

Rank	Heat	Lane	Name	Nationality	Time	Notes
1	2	4	Anastasia Gorbenko	Israel	2:14.74	Q
2	3	4	Cyrielle Duhamel	France	2:14.79	Q
3	4	4	Miku Kojima	Japan	2:15.37	Q
4	3	5	Anja Crevar	Serbia	2:15.55	Q
5	4	2	Neža Klančar	Slovenia	2:15.94	Q
6	2	5	Anna Pirovano	Italy	2:16.14	Q
7	4	5	Kate Douglass	United States	2:16.47	Q
8	4	3	Kaylee McKeown	Australia	2:17.03	Q
9	2	1	Yun Eun-sol	South Korea	2:17.35	
9	4	6	Nikoletta Pavlopoulou	Greece	2:17.35	
11	4	8	Alba Vázquez	Spain	2:17.54	
12	2	6	Maria Pessanha	Brazil	2:17.94	
13	2	3	Ajna Késely	Hungary	2:17.98	
14	3	2	Malene Rypestøl	Norway	2:18.15	
15	4	7	Nea-Amanda Heinola	Finland	2:19.01	
16	2	2	Aleksandra Knop	Poland	2:19.56	
17	1	7	Ieva Maļuka	Latvia	2:19.68	
18	3	7	Maria Claudia Gadea	Romania	2:20.02	
19	3	1	Azzahra Permatahani	Indonesia	2:20.31	
20	3	8	María Alborzen	Argentina	2:20.81	
21	3	3	Lea Polonsky	Israel	2:21.16	
22	1	5	Tamara Potocká	Slovakia	2:21.54	
23	1	4	Natalie Kan	Hong Kong	2:21.56	
24	3	6	Avery Wiseman	Canada	2:21.83	
25	1	2	Hannah Brunzell	Sweden	2:21.90	
26	2	7	Christin Mundell	South Africa	2:21.91	
27	1	3	Margaret Markvardt	Estonia	2:22.89	
28	2	8	Andrea Santander	Venezuela	2:24.22	
29	1	6	Vũ Thị Phương Anh	Vietnam	2:25.74	
30	4	1	Mariella Venter	South Africa	2:27.89	
31	1	1	Claudia Verdino	Monaco	2:32.14	

=== Final ===
The final was held at 18:46.

Rank	Lane	Name	Nationality	Time	Notes
1st place, gold medalist(s)	4	Anastasia Gorbenko	Israel	2:12.88	NR
2nd place, silver medalist(s)	6	Anja Crevar	Serbia	2:13.98	NR
3rd place, bronze medalist(s)	5	Cyrielle Duhamel	France	2:14.15	
4	3	Miku Kojima	Japan	2:15.09	
5	2	Neža Klančar	Slovenia	2:15.12	
6	1	Kate Douglass	United States	2:15.29	
7	8	Kaylee McKeown	Australia	2:15.65	
8	7	Anna Pirovano	Italy	2:16.07	
