= Swimming at the 2024 European Aquatics Championships – Women's 200 metre individual medley =

Women's 200 metre individual medley at the 2024 European Aquatics Championships
- Venue: Sports Centre Milan Gale Muškatirović
- Dates: 21 June (heats and semifinals); 22 June (final)
- Competitors: 18 from 14 nations
- Winning time: 2:09.75

Medalists
gold medal	Anastasia Gorbenko	Israel
silver medal	Lea Polonsky	Israel
bronze medal	Barbora Seemanová	Czech Republic

The Women's 200 metre individual medley competition of the 2024 European Aquatics Championships was held on 19 June 2024.

== Records ==
Prior to the competition, the existing world, European and championship records were as follows.

	Name	Nation	Time	Location	Date
World record	Katinka Hosszú	Hungary	2:06.12	Kazan	3 August 2015
European record	Katinka Hosszú	Hungary	2:06.12	Kazan	3 August 2015
Championship record	Katinka Hosszú	Hungary	2:07.30	London	19 May 2016

== Results ==
=== Heats ===
The heats were started on 21 July at 10:10.

Rank	Heat	Lane	Name	Nationality	Time	Notes
1	2	4	Anastasia Gorbenko	Israel	2:13.58	Q
2	1	5	Leah Schlosshan	Great Britain	2:13.64	Q
3	1	4	Dalma Sebestyén	Hungary	2:14.82	Q
4	1	3	Lena Kreundl	Austria	2:14.83	Q
5	1	2	Lisa Nystrand	Sweden	2:16.49	Q
6	2	2	Ellie McCartney	Ireland	2:16.66	Q
=7	2	3	Lea Polonsky	Israel	2:18.24	Q
=7	2	6	Tamara Potocká	Slovakia	2:18.24	Q
9	2	5	Barbora Seemanová	Czech Republic	2:18.27	Q
10	1	1	Tea Winblad	Sweden	2:18.92	Q
11	1	6	Hanna Bergman	Sweden	2:19.11	
12	2	7	Diana Petkova	Bulgaria	2:19.63	Q
13	1	7	Annie Hegmegi	Sweden	2:21.29	
14	2	8	Iman Avdić	Bosnia and Herzegovina	2:21.88	Q
15	1	8	Diana Musayelyan	Armenia	2:24.48	Q
16	2	0	Fatima Alkaramova	Azerbaijan	2:26.83	Q
17	1	0	Vivian Xhemollari	Albania	2:29.36	Q
	2	1	Louna Kasvio	Finland	Did not start	

=== Semifinals ===
The semifinals were started on 21 July at 19:37.

Rank	Heat	Lane	Name	Nationality	Time	Notes
1	2	4	Anastasia Gorbenko	Israel	2:11.61	Q
2	2	6	Tamara Potocká	Slovakia	2:12.42	Q, NR
3	1	5	Leah Schlosshan	Great Britain	2:12.70	Q
4	2	3	Lea Polonsky	Israel	2:12.93	Q
5	1	3	Lena Kreundl	Austria	2:13.25	Q
6	1	4	Dalma Sebestyén	Hungary	2:13.57	Q
7	2	5	Barbora Seemanová	Czech Republic	2:14.14	Q
8	2	2	Ellie McCartney	Ireland	2:14.37	Q
9	2	7	Diana Petkova	Bulgaria	2:14.59	
10	1	2	Lisa Nystrand	Sweden	2:15.83	
11	1	1	Tea Winblad	Sweden	2:18.98	
12	2	8	Iman Avdić	Bosnia and Herzegovina	2:19.73	
13	1	8	Diana Musayelyan	Armenia	2:24.63	
14	2	0	Fatima Alkaramova	Azerbaijan	2:25.15	
15	1	0	Vivian Xhemollari	Albania	2:28.78	

=== Final ===
The final was held on 22 July at 19:05.

Rank	Lane	Name	Nationality	Time	Notes
1st place, gold medalist(s)	4	Anastasia Gorbenko	Israel	2:09.75	
2nd place, silver medalist(s)	6	Lea Polonsky	Israel	2:11.18	
3rd place, bronze medalist(s)	1	Barbora Seemanová	Czech Republic	2:11.48	
4	3	Leah Schlosshan	Great Britain	2:11.74	
5	5	Tamara Potocká	Slovakia	2:13.39	
6	2	Lena Kreundl	Austria	2:13.55	
7	7	Dalma Sebestyén	Hungary	2:13.84	
8	8	Ellie McCartney	Ireland	2:14.09	
