= Swimming at the 2024 European Aquatics Championships – Women's 200 metre freestyle =

Women's 200 metre freestyle at the 2024 European Aquatics Championships
- Venue: Sports Centre Milan Gale Muškatirović
- Dates: 19 June (heats and semifinals); 20 June (final)
- Winning time: 1:55.37

Medalists
gold medal	Barbora Seemanová	Czech Republic
silver medal	Minna Ábrahám	Hungary
bronze medal	Nicole Maier	Germany

The Women's 200 metre freestyle competition of the 2024 European Aquatics Championships was held on 19 and 20 June 2024.

== Records ==
Prior to the competition, the existing world, European and championship records were as follows.

	Name	Nationality	Time	Location	Date
World record	Ariarne Titmus	Australia	1:52.23	Brisbane	12 June 2024
European record	Federica Pellegrini	Italy	1:52.98	Rome	29 July 2009
Championship record	Charlotte Bonnet	France	1:54.95	Glasgow	6 August 2018

== Results ==
=== Heats ===
The heats were started on 19 June at 09:30.
Qualification Rules: The 16 fastest from the heats qualify to the semifinals.

Rank	Heat	Lane	Name	Nationality	Time	Notes
1	3	5	Janja Šegel	Slovenia	1:57.81	Q
2	3	2	Panna Ugrai	Hungary	1:58.07	Q
3	5	4	Barbora Seemanová	Czech Republic	1:58.58	Q
4	4	5	Snæfríður Jórunnardóttir	Iceland	1:58.73	Q
=5	5	3	Nicole Maier	Germany	1:58.83	Q
=5	5	5	Minna Ábrahám	Hungary	1:58.83	Q
7	4	4	Nikolett Pádár	Hungary	1:58.96	
8	3	3	Lea Polonsky	Israel	1:59.21	Q
9	3	4	Daria Golovaty	Israel	1:59.52	Q
10	5	6	Leah Schlosshan	Great Britain	1:59.73	Q
11	4	2	Wiktoria Gusc	Poland	1:59.97	Q
12	4	1	Zuzanna Famulok	Poland	2:00.01	Q
13	5	1	Gizem Guvenc	Turkey	2:00.18	Q
14	4	6	Ayla Spitz	Israel	2:00.41	
15	4	3	Francisca Martins	Portugal	2:00.86	Q
16	5	9	Aleksa Gold	Estonia	2:01.27	Q
17	5	7	Katja Fain	Slovenia	2:01.32	Q
18	3	6	Maya Werner	Germany	2:01.88	Q
19	4	7	Iris Julia Berger	Austria	2:02.43	
20	5	8	Cornelia Pammer	Austria	2:02.68	
21	3	1	Ela Naz Özdemir	Turkey	2:02.93	
22	2	4	Vanna Djakovic	Switzerland	2:03.04	
23	4	0	Lena Opatril	Austria	2:03.43	
24	3	9	Deniz Ertan	Turkey	2:03.51	
25	5	2	Leonie Kullmann	Germany	56.63	
26	4	9	Johanna Enkner	Austria	56.69	
27	2	6	Zora Ripková	Slovakia	2:04.42	
28	3	8	Hanna Bergman	Sweden	2:04.49	
29	2	5	Elvira Mörtstrand	Sweden	2:04.82	
30	5	0	Merve Tuncel	Turkey	2:05.13	
31	2	7	Karoline Sørensen	Denmark	2:05.17	
32	2	3	Laura Benková	Slovakia	2:05.38	
33	2	1	Fatima Alkaramova	Azerbaijan	2:06.89	
34	3	0	Iman Avdić	Bosnia and Herzegovina	2:07.58	
35	2	8	Sara Jankovikj	North Macedonia	2:07.99	
36	1	4	Jana Milkovska	North Macedonia	2:09.82	
37	2	0	Ani Poghosyan	Armenia	2:10.50	
38	1	3	Kaltra Meca	Albania	2:10.58	
39	1	5	Ilaria Ceccaroni	San Marino	2:11.41	
40	2	2	Katarina Ćorović	Serbia	2:11.81	
	3	7	Andrea Murez	Israel	Did not start	

=== Semifinals ===
The semifinals were started on 19 June at 18:30.
Qualification Rules: The first 2 competitors of each semifinal and the remaining fastest (up to a total of 8 qualified competitors) from the semifinals advance to the final.

Rank	Heat	Lane	Name	Nationality	Time	Notes
1	1	3	Minna Ábrahám	Hungary	1:57.65	Q
2	2	5	Barbora Seemanová	Czech Republic	1:57.81	Q
3	1	5	Snæfríður Jórunnardóttir	Iceland	1:57.87	Q
4	2	3	Nicole Maier	Germany	1:58.10	Q
5	2	4	Janja Šegel	Slovenia	1:58.30	Q
6	2	1	Francisca Martins	Portugal	1:58.62	Q
7	1	6	Daria Golovaty	Israel	1:58.90	Q
8	2	2	Leah Schlosshan	Great Britain	1:59.11	Q
9	1	7	Gizem Guvenc	Turkey	1:59.23	
10	2	6	Lea Polonsky	Israel	1:59.31	
11	1	2	Wiktoria Gusc	Poland	1:59.55	
12	1	4	Panna Ugrai	Hungary	1:59.63	
13	2	8	Katja Fain	Slovenia	2:00.45	
14	2	7	Zuzanna Famulok	Poland	2:00.66	
15	1	1	Aleksa Gold	Estonia	2:01.27	
16	1	8	Maya Werner	Germany	2:01.76	

=== Final ===
The final was held on 20 June at 19:38.

Rank	Lane	Name	Nationality	Time	Notes
1st place, gold medalist(s)	5	Barbora Seemanová	Czech Republic	1:55.37	
2nd place, silver medalist(s)	4	Minna Ábrahám	Hungary	1:57.22	
3rd place, bronze medalist(s)	6	Nicole Maier	Germany	1:57.36	
4	3	Snæfríður Jórunnardóttir	Iceland	1:57.85	
5	1	Daria Golovaty	Israel	1:58.62	
6	2	Janja Šegel	Slovenia	1:58.91	
7	7	Francisca Martins	Portugal	1:59.11	
8	8	Leah Schlosshan	Great Britain	1:59.38	
