= 2021 FINA World Swimming Championships (25 m) – Women's 100 metre individual medley =

Swimming competition

Women's 100 metre individual medley at the 2021 FINA World Swimming Championships (25 m)
- Venue: Etihad Arena
- Location: Abu Dhabi, United Arab Emirates
- Dates: 18 December (heats and semifinals); 19 December (final)
- Competitors: 44 from 37 nations
- Winning time: 57.80 NR

Medalists
gold medal	Anastasia Gorbenko	Israel
silver medal	Béryl Gastaldello	France
bronze medal	Maria Kameneva

The Women's 100 metre individual medley competition of the 2021 FINA World Swimming Championships (25 m) will be held on 18 and 19 December 2021.

== Records ==
Prior to the competition, the existing world and championship records were as follows.

World record	Katinka Hosszú (HUN)	56.51	Berlin, Germany	7 August 2017
Competition record	Katinka Hosszú (HUN)	56.70	Doha, Qatar	5 December 2014

== Results ==
=== Heats ===
The heats were started on 18 December at 10:12.

Rank	Heat	Lane	Name	Nationality	Time	Notes
1	3	4	Anastasia Gorbenko	Israel	58.36	Q
2	3	3	Maria Ugolkova	Switzerland	59.05	Q
3	4	5	Marrit Steenbergen	Netherlands	59.06	Q
4	3	5	Kayla Sanchez	Canada	59.17	Q
5	2	5	Diana Petkova	Bulgaria	59.19	Q, NR
6	4	4	Maria Kameneva	Russian Swimming Federation	59.34	Q
7	5	4	Béryl Gastaldello	France	59.38	Q
8	4	3	Abbey Weitzeil	United States	59.44	Q
9	3	2	Lena Kreundl	Austria	59.45	Q
9	5	2	Bailey Andison	Canada	59.45	Q
9	5	3	Costanza Cocconcelli	Italy	59.45	Q
12	5	7	Emelie Fast	Sweden	59.50	Q
13	5	5	Melanie Margalis	United States	59.54	Q
14	2	2	Tang Qianting	China	59.56	Q
15	2	6	Mona McSharry	Ireland	59.65	Q, NR
15	4	2	Kim Busch	Netherlands	59.65	Q
17	3	6	Irina Shvaeva	Russian Swimming Federation	1:00.22	
18	4	1	Kristýna Horská	Czech Republic	1:00.31	
19	3	1	Ilaria Cusinato	Italy	1:00.37	
20	5	9	Laura Littlejohn	New Zealand	1:00.43	
21	4	7	Fanny Lecluyse	Belgium	1:00.52	
22	5	1	Molly Renshaw	Great Britain	1:00.67	
23	4	9	Nathalia Almeida	Brazil	1:01.02	
24	3	7	Cornelia Pammer	Austria	1:01.33	
25	5	0	Janja Šegel	Slovenia	1:01.59	
26	4	8	Tamara Potocká	Slovakia	1:01.65	
27	3	9	Ieva Maļuka	Latvia	1:01.69	
28	3	8	Sze Hang Yu	Hong Kong	1:01.76	
29	4	0	Natalie Kan	Hong Kong	1:01.77	
30	2	4	Maria Romanjuk	Estonia	1:01.79	
31	3	0	Nina Stanisavljević	Serbia	1:01.97	
32	2	3	Jessica Vall	Spain	1:02.04	
33	2	8	Maria Drasidou	Greece	1:02.17	
34	2	1	Jung Ha-eun	South Korea	1:02.24	
35	2	7	Marie Pietruschka	Germany	1:02.62	
36	2	9	Florencia Perotti	Argentina	1:03.16	
37	3	0	Phiangkhwan Pawapotako	Thailand	1:03.23	
38	1	4	Marissa Lugo	Puerto Rico	1:04.11	
39	1	2	Luna Chabat	Uruguay	1:04.28	
40	1	1	Isabella Alas	El Salvador	1:06.10	
41	1	3	Alison Jackson	Cayman Islands	1:07.32	
42	1	6	Aaliyah Palestrini	Seychelles	1:10.20	
43	1	5	Latroya Pina	Cape Verde	1:12.08	
44	1	7	Hamna Ahmed	Maldives	1:15.82	
	4	6	Fanny Teijonsalo	Finland	DNS	
	5	6	Michelle Coleman	Sweden	DNS	
	5	8	Quah Jing Wen	Singapore	DNS	

=== Semifinals ===
The semifinals were started on 18 December at 19:08.

Rank	Heat	Lane	Name	Nationality	Time	Notes
1	1	4	Maria Ugolkova	Switzerland	58.25	Q, NR
2	1	3	Maria Kameneva	Russian Swimming Federation	58.45	Q
3	2	7	Costanza Cocconcelli	Italy	58.58	Q
4	2	4	Anastasia Gorbenko	Israel	58.65	Q
5	2	6	Béryl Gastaldello	France	58.66	Q
6	1	2	Bailey Andison	Canada	58.74	Q
7	2	5	Marrit Steenbergen	Netherlands	58.75	Q
8	2	1	Melanie Margalis	United States	58.96	Q
9	1	6	Abbey Weitzeil	United States	59.00	
10	1	1	Tang Qianting	China	59.01	
11	1	5	Kayla Sanchez	Canada	59.07	
12	2	2	Lena Kreundl	Austria	59.08	NR
13	2	8	Mona McSharry	Ireland	59.35	NR
14	1	7	Emelie Fast	Sweden	59.56	
15	2	3	Diana Petkova	Bulgaria	59.58	
16	1	8	Kim Busch	Netherlands	59.82	

=== Final ===
Rank	Lane	Name	Nationality	Time	Notes
1st place, gold medalist(s)	6	Anastasia Gorbenko	Israel	57.80	NR
2nd place, silver medalist(s)	2	Béryl Gastaldello	France	57.96	
3rd place, bronze medalist(s)	5	Maria Kameneva	Russian Swimming Federation	58.15	
4	4	Maria Ugolkova	Switzerland	58.27	
5	3	Costanza Cocconcelli	Italy	58.66	
6	1	Marrit Steenbergen	Netherlands	58.74	
7	8	Melanie Margalis	United States	59.10	
8	7	Bailey Andison	Canada	59.37	
