= Swimming at the 2024 World Aquatics Championships – Women's 400 metre individual medley =

Women's 400 metre individual medley at the Swimming at the 2024 World Aquatics Championships
- Venue: Aspire Dome
- Location: Doha, Qatar
- Dates: 18 February (heats and final)
- Competitors: 21 from 19 nations
- Winning time: 4:37.14

Medalists
gold medal	Freya Colbert	Great Britain
silver medal	Anastasia Gorbenko	Israel
bronze medal	Sara Franceschi	Italy

The Women's 400 metre individual medley competition at the 2024 World Aquatics Championships was held on 18 February 2024.

== Qualification ==
Each National Federation was permitted to enter a maximum of two qualified athletes in each individual event, but only if both of them had attained the "A" standard qualification time at approved qualifying events. For this event, the "A" standard qualification time was 4:43.06. Federations could enter one athlete into the event if they met the "B" standard qualification time. For this event, the "B" standard qualification time was 4:52.97. Athletes could also enter the event if they had met an "A" or "B" standard in a different event and their Federation had not entered anyone else. Additional considerations applied to Federations who had few swimmers enter through the standard qualification times. Federations in this category could at least enter two men and two women into the competition, all of whom could enter into up to two events.

== Records ==
Prior to the competition, the existing world and championship records were as follows.

World record	Summer McIntosh (CAN)	4:25.87	Toronto, Canada	1 April 2023
Competition record	Summer McIntosh (CAN)	4:27.11	Fukuoka, Japan	30 July 2023

== Results ==
=== Heats ===
The heats were held at 09:50.

Rank	Heat	Lane	Name	Nationality	Time	Notes
1	2	7	Tessa Cieplucha	Canada	4:40.80	Q
2	2	2	Anja Crevar	Serbia	4:41.11	Q
3	3	4	Freya Colbert	Great Britain	4:42.33	Q
4	2	5	Cyrielle Duhamel	France	4:42.68	Q
5	3	6	Anastasia Gorbenko	Israel	4:42.79	Q
6	2	6	Ichika Kajimoto	Japan	4:42.85	Q
7	2	3	Boglárka Kapás	Hungary	4:43.53	Q
8	2	4	Sara Franceschi	Italy	4:43.61	Q
9	3	2	Lilla Bognar	United States	4:44.22	
10	3	5	Ella Jansen	Canada	4:44.93	
11	3	0	Kristen Romano	Puerto Rico	4:45.78	
12	2	8	Mao Yihan	China	4:46.88	
13	3	1	Kayla Han	United States	4:47.12	
14	3	7	Agostina Hein	Argentina	4:47.45	
15	3	8	Gabrielle Roncatto	Brazil	4:48.44	
16	3	9	Zuzanna Famulok	Poland	4:48.53	
17	2	1	Kamonchanok Kwanmuang	Thailand	4:49.11	
18	2	0	Xiandi Chua	Philippines	4:51.01	
19	3	3	Kiah Melverton	Australia	4:53.82	
20	1	4	Gwinn Applejean	Chinese Taipei	5:00.08	
21	1	3	Karin Belbeisi	Jordan	5:20.71	
	1	5	Nikoleta Trníková	Slovakia	Did not start	

=== Final ===
The final was held at 20:19.

Rank	Lane	Name	Nationality	Time	Notes
1st place, gold medalist(s)	3	Freya Colbert	Great Britain	4:37.14	
2nd place, silver medalist(s)	2	Anastasia Gorbenko	Israel	4:37.36	NR
3rd place, bronze medalist(s)	8	Sara Franceschi	Italy	4:37.86	
4	5	Anja Crevar	Serbia	4:38.93	
5	1	Boglárka Kapás	Hungary	4:39.78	
6	6	Cyrielle Duhamel	France	4:41.95	
7	4	Tessa Cieplucha	Canada	4:43.02	
8	7	Ichika Kajimoto	Japan	4:43.61	

== Sources ==
- "Competition Regulations" (PDF). World Aquatics. Archived (PDF) from the original on 15 February 2026.
