= Anastasia Gorbenko =

Israeli swimmer (born 2003)

Anastasia Gorbenko אנסטסיה "נסטיה" גורבנקו
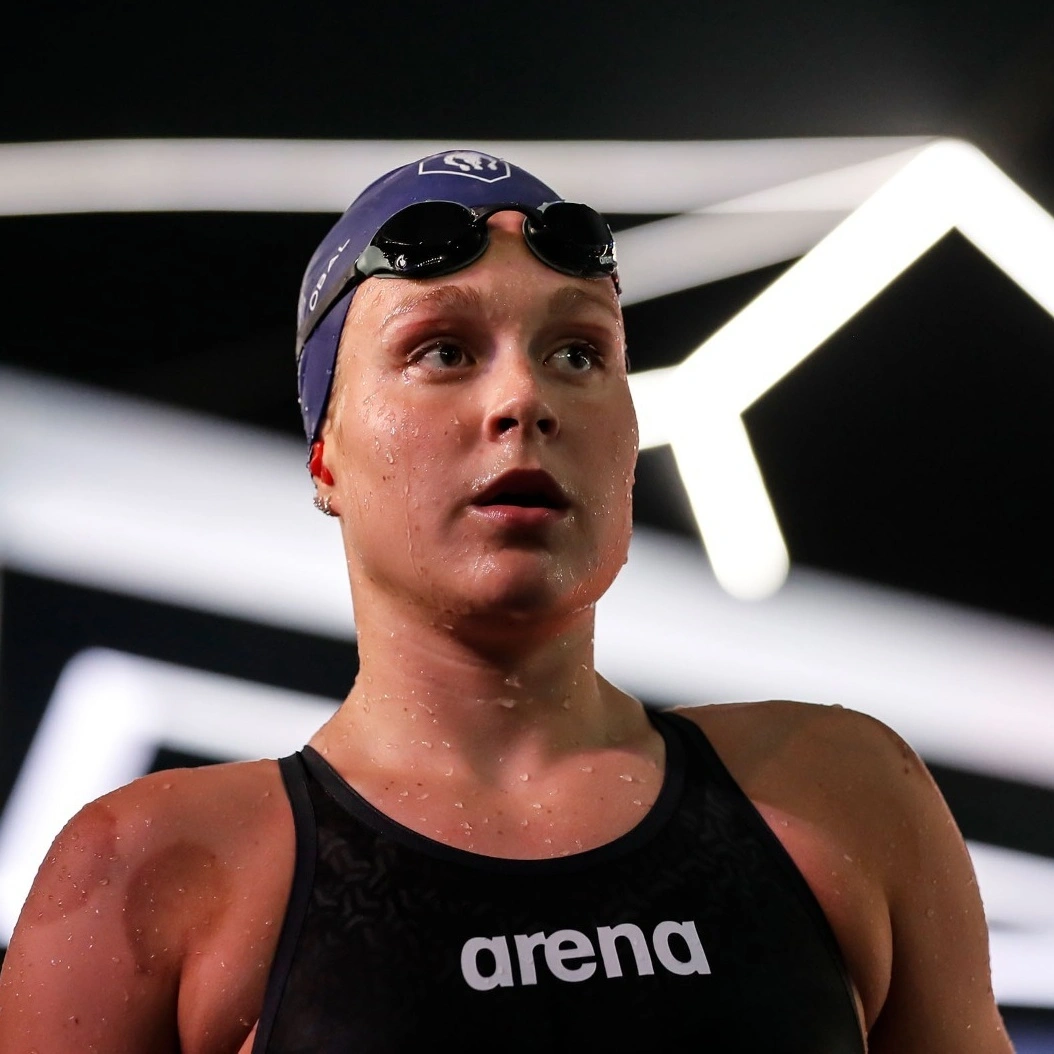
- Gorbenko in 2021

Personal information
- Nickname: Nastiya
- National team: Israel
- Born: 7 August 2003 (age 23) Haifa, Israel

Sport
- Sport: Swimming
- Strokes: Freestyle, medley, breaststroke, backstroke, butterfly
- Club: Maccabi Kiryat Bialik
Medal record
Women's swimming
Representing Israel
Event	1st	2nd	3rd
World Championships (LC)	0	1	0
World Championships (SC)	2	0	0
European Championships (LC)	6	0	0
European Championships (SC)	1	0	0
Total	9	1	0
World Championships (LC)
Silver medal – second place	2024 Doha	400 m medley
World Championships (SC)
Gold medal – first place	2021 Abu Dhabi	50 m breaststroke
Gold medal – first place	2021 Abu Dhabi	100 m medley
European Championships (LC)
Gold medal – first place	2020 Budapest	200 m medley
Gold medal – first place	2022 Rome	200 m medley
Gold medal – first place	2024 Belgrade	200 m medley
Gold medal – first place	2024 Belgrade	400 m medley
Gold medal – first place	2024 Belgrade	4×200 m freestyle
Gold medal – first place	2024 Belgrade	4×100 m mixed medley
European Championships (SC)
Gold medal – first place	2021 Kazan	200 m medley
Bronze medal – third place	2025 Lublin	100 m breaststroke
Bronze medal – third place	2025 Lublin	100 m medley
Bronze medal – third place	2025 Lublin	200 m individual medley
Youth Olympics
Gold medal – first place	2018 Buenos Aires	200 m medley
European Junior Championships (LC)
Silver medal – second place	2019 Kazan	50 m backstroke
Silver medal – second place	2019 Kazan	200 m medley
European Youth Olympic Festival
Silver medal – second place	2017 Győr	4×100 m medley

Anastasia "Nastiya" Gorbenko (Hebrew: אנסטסיה "נסטיה" גורבנקו; born 7 August 2003) is an Israeli competitive swimmer. She competes in the backstroke, breaststroke, freestyle, and medley. She has won 8 World and European championships gold medals, competed at 2 Olympic finals, broken most of the Israeli national records for women and mixed relays, and is considered to be Israel's greatest swimmer of all time. In February 2024, Gorbenko won a silver medal at the Doha World Championships in the women's 400 meters individual medley. Gorbenko represented Israel at the 2024 Summer Olympics in swimming in the 100m backstroke, 200m backstroke, 100m breaststroke, 200m individual medley, 400m individual medley, 4 × 200 m freestyle relay, and mixed 4 × 100 m medley relay.

== Early life ==
Gorbenko was born in Haifa, Israel. She grew up in Kiryat Yam, Israel, and later moved with her family to Kiryat Bialik, Israel. Both her father Vladimir Gorbenko (a computer expert) and her mother Larisa (a special education teacher) had immigrated from Ukraine to Israel. She has an older sister and a younger sister. When she was 12 years old, she dreamed of swimming in the Olympics. She trained at the Wingate Institute in Netanya, and attended Hof HaSharon High School in Kibbutz Shefayim, where she majored in biology.

== Swimming career ==
Gorbenko competes in the 100m backstroke, 100m breaststroke, 100m freestyle, 200m backstroke, 200m breaststroke, 200m medley, 50m backstroke, 4 × 100m freestyle, 4 × 100m medley, 4 × 100m freestyle mixed, and 4 × 200m freestyle. She “slightly” prefers breaststroke. Gorbenko's club is Maccabi Kiryat Bialik.

Gorbenko won the gold medal in the girls' 200m individual medley at the 2018 Youth Olympic Games. In 2019, at the Barcelona Open she won the women's 200m individual medley, and later in the year she established new Israeli national records in the 200m individual medley and 200m breaststroke. As of November 2019, she set new Israeli national records in the 50m back, 100m back, 200m breast, 200m IM, 400m IM in long course, and the 200m IM in short course, and shared four national relay records. She competed for Israel at the 2020 Summer Olympics in two Olympic finals: one in the women's 100m individual backstroke event, and one in the mixed 4 × 100 metre medley relay event together with her fellow Israeli mixed teammates. In May 2021, Gorbenko won the gold medal in the 200m medley at the 2020 European Championships (LC) in Budapest. In November 2021, Gorbenko won the gold medal in the 200m medley at the 2020 European Championships (SC) in Kazan. In December 2021, at the 2021 World Championships (SC) in Abu Dhabi, she won 2 individual gold medals: The first gold medal in the 50m breaststroke, and the second gold medal in the 100m medley; Thus, setting and breaking her own national records for Israel – at the same event.

=== 2016–17; Maccabiah Games gold medals ===
In April 2016 Gorbenko set an Israeli age 13 record in the 100m breaststroke, at 1:15.43.

In April 2017 she set an Israeli age 14 record in the 100m backstroke, at 1:04.21, and in the 200m individual medley, at 2:19.15, and in June 2017 Gorbenko set an Israeli age 14 record in the 200m breaststroke, at 2:35.94. In July 2017 at the 2017 Maccabiah Games, she won gold medals in the girl's 100m junior freestyle, as well as the girls' 4 × 100m freestyle relay.

=== 2018; Youth Olympics gold medal ===
In July 2018 Gorbenko set a new Israeli record in the 200m breaststroke, at 2:29.17, at the 2018 European Junior Swimming Championships; Long Course (50 m) in Helsinki, Finland. In August 2018 she set a new Israeli record in the 100m breaststroke, at 1:09.44, at the 2018 European Aquatics Championships; Long Course (50 m) in Glasgow, Scotland.

In October 2018, having just turned 15 years of age and competing against girls two to three years older, she won the girls' 200m individual medley at the 2018 Youth Olympic Games in Buenos Aires, Argentina. It was Israel's first gold medal in swimming at this level of international competition. Gorbenko swam a 2:12.88 – with splits of 29.31 (after butterfly), 1:03.43 (after backstroke), and 1:41.49 (after breaststroke), beating Anja Crevar of Serbia by more than a second. She set a new Israeli record, breaking that achieved by Amit Ivry in the 2012 London Olympics (2:13.29).

=== 2019; Barcelona Open gold medal ===
In January 2019, at the age of 15, at the Barcelona Open in the women's 200m individual medley Gorbenko swam a 2:13.56 to win by over 4 seconds. She swam the fastest fly, back, and breaststroke splits in the field, at 28.60, 34.60, and 38.36 respectively.

In March 2019 at the French Golden Tour meet she set three new Israeli records; in the 100m backstroke (1:01.03), in the 200m IM (2:12.54), and in the 400m IM (4:47.58).

In May 2019, at the 2019 Speedo Grand Challenge in Irvine, California, Gorbenko established a new Israeli national record in the 200m individual medley with a time of 2:11.98, and established a new Israeli national record in the 200m breaststroke with a time of 2:28.78 (breaking the prior record of 2:29.03 set by Julia Banach in 2009) to win the event by over a second. She also placed second in the 100m breaststroke with a time of 1:10.04, just short of her personal best of 1:09.74. In addition she swam a personal best in the 200m freestyle (2:00.83).

In July 2019, at the 2019 European Junior Swimming Championships in Kazan, Russia, she won silver medals in both the women's 5 m backstroke (setting a new Israeli national record with a time of 28.21), behind Daria Vaskina of Russia, and in the women's 200m individual medley behind Zoe Vogelmann of Germany.

Gorbenko competed in the women's 200m individual medley at the 2019 World Aquatics Championships.

In August 2019 at the 7th FINA World Junior Swimming Championships she set a new national record in the women's 100m backstroke with a time of 1:00.58.

In October 2019 Gorbenko set an Israeli record in the women's 400m individual medley with a time of 4:37.68. That month she also set a national record when she swam a 2:07.64 in the 200m individual medley for LA Current in Budapest, Hungary. In doing so she also set a new European junior short course 200m individual medley record. She also led off the 400m freestyle relay to an Israeli record in the 100m free, swimming a 52.87.

In November 2019, she broke her own Israeli record in the women's 400m individual medley at the Kiryat Bialik pool as part of the Millennium meet, swimming a 4:35.82. Gorbenko also set a new Israeli junior record in the 50m breaststroke with a 31.01. As of that month, she set new Israeli national records in the 50m back, 100m back, 200m breast, 200m IM, and 400m IM in long course, and the 200m IM in short course, and shared four national relay records.

=== 2020; European junior records ===
In February 2020, she set a new Israeli national record in the women's 400m IM at the 2020 FFN Golden Tour Camille Muffat meet in Nice, France, with a time of 4:41.48 while winning a bronze medal. She also set a new Israeli junior record with a time of 55.36 in the 100m free.

In August 2020 at the Israeli Swimming Association ‘end-of-season’ meet at the Wingate Olympic Pool, she won a gold medal and set a national record of 24.53 in the 50m freestyle, won a gold medal and set a national record in the 100m back with a time of 58.37, and won a gold medal and set a national record in the 100m breaststroke with a time of 1:05.42. She also set Israeli junior records in the 200m breast (2:22.70) and 100m fly (58.34).

In October 2020 in Budapest, Hungary, she set new Israeli national and European junior records in the women's 200m individual medley, with a time of 2:06.46. She also set an Israeli record and European junior record in the 100 free with a time of 52.39. In the 100m IM she set a new Israeli record by swimming it in 58.06.

In November 2020 she set a new Israeli record and European junior record in the 200 IM with a time of 2:05.98.

In December 2020 at the Israeli Olympic Qualification Meet at the Wingate Institute she set Israeli 17 and under records in the women's 50m freestyle (25.23) while winning a gold medal, and in the 200m free (1:59.30).

=== 2020 Tokyo Summer Olympics (2021) ===
Gorbenko represented Israel at the 2020 Summer Olympics in five different events: She finished 10th in the women's 200m individual medley event's semifinals. She also competed in the women's 100m backstroke event, where she qualified for the final in the competition, finishing 8th overall. Gorbenko competed in the second heat and in the final of the mixed 4 × 100 metre medley relay (59.55) of the Summer Olympics, along with fellow Israeli Olympic swimmers: Itay Goldfaden (59.86), Gal Cohen Groumi (51.58), and Andrea Murez (53.78), finishing 8th overall in the mixed event's final.

=== 2021; World Championships, European Championships, and World Cup gold medals ===
European Championships (LC)
Gold medal – first place	200m medley	2:09.99 (NR)

European Championships (SC)
Gold medal – first place	200m medley	2:05.17

2021 World Championships (SC)
Gold medal – first place	50m breaststroke	29.34 (NR)
Gold medal – first place	100m medley	57.80 (NR)

In April 2021, at the 2021 Swim Open Stockholm, she set an Israeli LCM record of 2:10.86 in the 200m back, and won a silver medal in the 200m IM, swimming 2:13.49.

In May 2021, at the age of 17, Gorbenko won the gold medal in the 200 individual medley at the 2020 European Championships (LC) in Budapest, with a new Israeli record time of 2:09.99, and set a new Israeli record in the 100 meter backstroke, with a time of 59.96.

As of August 2021, she held Israeli national records in 16 different events, nearly half of the 35 official events for which records were kept. She held records in every stroke other than the butterfly.

In September 2021 in Naples, Italy, she set new Israeli records in the 200m breaststroke with a time of 2:19.80, and in the 200m IM with a time of 2:05.04.

In October 2021 Gorbenko won the gold medal in the 50m breaststroke, and the gold medal in the 100m breaststroke (setting a national record with a time of 1:04.44), as well as the gold medal in the 100m individual medley at the 2021 Swimming World Cup (SC) in Berlin. She set an Israeli national record in the 50m back, with a time of 26.63.

In November 2021, Gorbenko won the gold medal in the 200m individual medley at the 2020 European Championships (SC) in Kazan, Russia, with a time of 2 minutes and 5.17 seconds, beating Maria Ugolkova of Switzerland. That month, swimming in Eindhoven in the Netherlands for the LA Current she set an Israeli national record in the 200m backstroke with a time of 2:05.36, and in the 100m back with a time of 57.49.

In December 2021, at the 2021 World Championships (SC) in Abu Dhabi, the 18-year-old Gorbenko won two individual gold medals: The first gold medal in the 50m breaststroke in 29.34 seconds, ahead of Benedetta Pilato of Italy, and the second gold medal in the 100m individual medley in 57.80 seconds, ahead of Beryl Gastaldello of France; Thus, setting and breaking her own national records for Israel – at the same event.

She finished 2021 ranked in the world's top 10 in five different SCM events.

=== 2022; European Swimming Champion ===
In April 2022 at the Swedish Open, she won the gold medal with a national record of 2:10.43 in the 200m medley ahead of Hungarian 2016 Olympic champion Katinka Hosszu.

In May 2022 at the Mare Nostrum Tour in Barcelona, Spain, she won the gold medal in the women's 200m IM, with a time of 2:10.65, ahead of Katinka Hosszu, Hungarian multi-Olympic medalist.

In July 2022 at the 2022 Maccabiah Games in Israel, she won a gold medal in the women's 200 IM, with a time of 2:20.17. At the time, Gorbenko held Israel's national record in the event, and a total of eight Israeli LCM national records.

In August 2022 she won the gold medal at the European Swimming Championships in Rome, Italy, in the 200m individual medley in 2:10.92 minutes, ahead of the Dutch swimmer Marrit Steenbergen. It was the second year in a row that she won the title.

In December 2022 at the Israeli national Short Course Championships she set national records in the women's 200m backstroke with a gold medal time of 2:04.40, and in the women's 50m freestyle with a time of 24.46.

=== 2023; World Championship silver medal ===
As of April 2023, Gorbenko was the 14th-fastest female swimmer of all time in the 50m breast, at 29.34, and also Israel's National Record holder in the 50m back, at 26.63.

At the May 2023 Mare Nostrum Monaco she broke her own record in the 200m IM with a time of 2:09:28. It was the sixth-best time for women in the event in the 2022–23 season, .12 seconds behind that of Marrit Steenbergen of the Netherlands. Gorbenko dedicated her medal to her childhood friend Matan Angrest, who was among the 130 kidnapped hostages being held captive by Hamas in Gaza. She also won a silver medal as she broke her own 400m IM Israeli record, swimming a 4:40.76.

In June 2023 at the 2023 Israeli Championships, Gorbenko won a gold medal in the 200m fly in 26.54, and a silver medal in the 200m free in 1:58.82.

In December 2023 at the U.S. Open Swimming Championships she won a silver medal in the women's 400m individual medley with a time of 4:37.90, in Greensboro, North Carolina.

=== 2024–present; 2024 Paris Olympics and European Championship ===
In February 2024, the 20-year-old Gorbenko won a silver medal at the Doha World Championships in Qatar in the women's 400m individual medley in a new Israeli record time of 4:37:36, 0.22 of a second behind gold medal winner Briton Freya Colbert. After some in crowd booed her, she said: "I'm doing this with the Israeli flag, and I'm proud of that.

In June 2024, at 20 years old, at the 2024 European Aquatics Championships in Belgrade, Serbia, she won the 200m individual medley for the third Europeans in a row, the 400m IM gold medal, a women's 4×200 freestyle relay gold medal and another gold medal in the 4×100 medley with Daria Golovaty, Ayla Spitz, and Lea Polonsky.

Gorbenko represented Israel at the 2024 Paris Olympics in swimming in the 100m backstroke, 200m backstroke, 100m breaststroke, 200m individual medley, 400m individual medley, 4 × 200 m freestyle relay, and mixed 4 × 100 m medley relay.

She advanced to the semifinals of the Women's 100m Breaststroke, with a time of 1:06.22, but decided not to participate in the next round in order to conserve energy for one of her specialties, the 400m Individual Medley, the following day which was the same day as the 100m Breaststroke final.

== Accomplishments and awards ==
- 8th place: 100 m backstroke at the 2020 Summer Olympics (LC) in Tokyo
- 8th place: Mixed 4 × 100 m medley relay at the 2020 Summer Olympics (LC) in Tokyo
- 1st place: 50 m breaststroke at the 2021 Swimming World Cup (SC) in Berlin
- 1st place: 100 m breaststroke at the 2021 Swimming World Cup (SC) in Berlin
- 1st place: 100 m individual medley at the 2021 Swimming World Cup (SC) in Berlin
- 1st place: 200 m medley at the 2020 European Swimming Championships (LC) in Budapest
- 1st place: 200 m individual medley at the 2021 European Swimming Championships (SC) in Kazan
- 1st place: 50 m breaststroke at the 2021 FINA World Swimming World Cup (SC) in Abu Dhabi
- 1st place: 100 m individual medley at the 2021 FINA World Swimming World Cup (SC) in Abu Dhabi
- 5th place: 200 m individual medley at the 2022 FINA World Swimming World Cup (LC) in Budapest
- FINA's Top 10 Moments: 2021 FINA Swimming World Cup (#2)
- Forbes 30 Under 30 of 2022 by Forbes Israel

== See also ==
- List of Israeli records in swimming
- List of European Aquatics Championships medalists in swimming (women)
- List of European Short Course Swimming Championships medalists (women)
- List of World Aquatics Championships medalists in swimming (women)
- List of World Swimming Championships (25 m) medalists (women)
- List of Maccabiah records in swimming
- World record progression 50 metres breaststroke
- World record progression 100 metres individual medley
- World record progression 200 metres individual medley
- World record progression 4 × 100 metres freestyle relay
- World record progression 4 × 200 metres freestyle relay
- Israel at the Youth Olympics
- List of Israelis
