= Swimming at the 2022 Mediterranean Games – Women's 400 metre individual medley =

Women's 400 metre individual medley at the 2022 Mediterranean Games
- Location: Bir El Djir, Algeria
- Dates: 1 July
- Competitors: 12 from 7 nations
- Winning time: 4:40.86

Medalists
gold medal	Sara Franceschi	Italy
silver medal	Deniz Ertan	Turkey
bronze medal	Alba Vázquez	Spain

The women's 400 metre individual medley competition at the 2022 Mediterranean Games was held on 1 July 2022 at the Aquatic Center of the Olympic Complex in Bir El Djir.

== Records ==
Prior to this competition, the existing world and Mediterranean Games records were as follows:

World record	Katinka Hosszú (HUN)	4:26.36	Rio de Janeiro, Brazil	6 August 2016
Mediterranean Games record	Catalina Corró (ESP)	4:39.42	Tarragona, Spain	23 June 2018

== Results ==
=== Heats ===
The heats were started at 10:20.

Rank	Heat	Lane	Name	Nationality	Time	Notes
1	1	4	Deniz Ertan	Turkey	4:46.28	Q
2	2	4	Sara Franceschi	Italy	4:46.75	Q
3	2	5	Alba Vázquez	Spain	4:49.60	Q
4	2	2	Raquel Pereira	Portugal	4:50.36	Q
5	2	3	Lara Grangeon	France	4:50.47	Q, WD
6	1	6	Viktoriya Zeynep Güneş	Turkey	4:51.67	Q
7	1	5	Carlotta Toni	Italy	4:51.99	Q
8	2	6	Paula Juste	Spain	4:53.58	Q
9	1	3	Camille Tissandié	France	4:54.84	Q
10	2	7	Hamida Rania Nefsi	Algeria	5:01.05	
11	1	7	Imène Kawthar Zitouni	Algeria	5:04.81	
12	1	2	Chrysoula Mitsakou	Greece	5:07.27	

=== Final ===
The final was held at 18:18.

Rank	Lane	Name	Nationality	Time	Notes
1st place, gold medalist(s)	5	Sara Franceschi	Italy	4:40.86	
2nd place, silver medalist(s)	4	Deniz Ertan	Turkey	4:40.97	
3rd place, bronze medalist(s)	3	Alba Vázquez	Spain	4:45.63	
4	2	Viktoriya Zeynep Güneş	Turkey	4:46.30	
5	6	Raquel Pereira	Portugal	4:48.92	
6	1	Paula Juste	Spain	4:52.16	
7	8	Camille Tissandié	France	4:52.18	
8	7	Carlotta Toni	Italy	4:54.80	
