= Alba Vázquez =

Spanish swimmer (born 2002)

Personal information
- Full name: Alba Vázquez Ruiz
- National team: Spain
- Born: 24 February 2002 (age 24) Spain

Sport
- Sport: Swimming
- Strokes: Breaststroke, individual medley
Medal record
Women's swimming
Representing Spain
Event	1st	2nd	3rd
Mediterranean Games	0	0	1
Swimming World Cup	0	0	2
World Junior Championships	1	1	0
Total	1	1	3
Mediterranean Games
Bronze medal – third place	2022 Oran	400 m medley
Swimming World Cup
Bronze medal – third place	2018 Doha	200 m breaststroke
Bronze medal – third place	2018 Doha	400 m medley
World Junior Championships
Gold medal – first place	2019 Budapest	400 m medley
Silver medal – second place	2019 Budapest	200 m medley
European Junior Championships
Gold medal – first place	2019 Kazan	400 m medley

Alba Vázquez Ruiz (born 24 February 2002) is a Spanish swimmer. She won the bronze medal in the 400 metre individual medley at the 2022 Mediterranean Games. At the 2019 European Junior Championships, she won a gold medal in the 400 metre individual medley. She won the gold medal in the 400 metre individual medley and the silver medal in the 200 metre individual medley at the 2019 World Junior Championships. She is a former world junior record holder in the 400 metre individual medley.

== Early life ==
Vázquez was born 24 February 2002 in Spain.

== Career ==
=== 2018–2021 ===
==== 2018 Swimming World Cup: Doha ====
2018 World Cup — Doha
Bronze medal – third place	200 m breaststroke	2:30.33
Bronze medal – third place	400 m individual medley	4:48.68

At the 2018 FINA Swimming World Cup stop held at the Hamad Aquatic Centre in Doha, Qatar, Vázquez won her first medal in the 200 metre breaststroke where she posted a time of 2:30.33 to finish 6.78 seconds behind the gold medalist in the event, Yuliya Yefimova of Russia, 6.27 seconds behind the silver medalist, Vitalina Simonova of Russia, and win the bronze medal. In the 400 metre individual medley, Vázquez won another bronze medal, finishing only after Katinka Hosszú of Hungary and Zsuzsanna Jakabos of Hungary with her time of 4:48.68.

==== 2019 European Junior Championships ====
2019 European Junior Championships
Gold medal – first place	400 m individual medley	4:40.64 (CR)

In July 2019, at the 2019 European Junior Swimming Championships held at the Palace of Water Sports in Kazan, Russia, Vázquez set a new Championships record in the 400 metre individual medley with her gold medal-winning time of 4:40.64, breaking the former record of 4:40.88 set in 2009 by Gráinne Murphy of Ireland.

==== 2019 World Junior Championships ====
2019 World Junior Championships
Gold medal – first place	400 m individual medley	4:38.53 (WJ, CR)
Silver medal – second place	200 m individual medley	2:13.43

On the first day of competition, 20 August, of the 2019 World Junior Championships at Danube Arena in Budapest, Hungary, Vázquez advanced to the final of the 400 metre individual medley with a time of 4:43.17 that ranked her first overall. In the final of the 400 metre individual medley later the same day, Vázquez won the gold medal in the event with a world junior record and Championships record time of 4:38.53, breaking the former records set by Rosie Rudin of Great Britain in 2015. Her world junior record was the first one set at the 2019 World Junior Championships. With her swim, Vázquez also became the second fastest female Spaniard in the event in history only behind Mireia Belmonte. On 23 August, Vázquez ranked seventh in the prelims heats of the 200 metre individual medley, swimming a time of 2:15.82 and qualifying for the final. Later in the day, Vázquez swam a personal best time of 2:13.43 in the final, winning the silver medal in the event. The two medals Vázquez won, one gold medal and one silver medal, were the only medals won by swimmers representing Spain at the year's World Junior Championships.

Vázquez's accomplishments at the European Junior Championships and the World Junior Championships, caught the attention of Diario AS who gave her their "Prospect Award" for being the most promising newcomer athlete in Spain for the 2019 year.

==== 2020 European Aquatics Championships ====
At the 2020 European Aquatics Championships in Budapest, Hungary in May, Vázquez placed eleventh in her first event, the 400 metre individual medley, with a time of 4:45.26. In her second and final event, the 200 metre individual medley, she swam a 2:15.36 in the preliminary heats, placing 23rd overall.

=== 2022 ===
In April 2022, Vázquez was named to a preliminary roster for Spain for the 2022 European Aquatics Championships in the 200 metre individual medley and 400 metre individual medley events. She was also named to the 2022 Mediterranean Games roster for the same events.

==== 2022 Mediterranean Games ====
2022 Mediterranean Games
Bronze medal – third place	400 m individual medley	4:45.53

The first day of swimming competition at the 2022 Mediterranean Games, 1 July in Oran, Algeria, Vázquez qualified for the final of the 400 metre individual medley later in the day. In the final, she finished behind Sara Franceschi of Italy and Deniz Ertan of Turkey to win the bronze medal with a time of 4:45.53. Three days later, she ranked seventh in the preliminaries of the 200 metre individual medley, qualifying for the final with a time of 2:20.44. She placed fifth in the final with a time of 2:16.50. The final day of swimming competition, she ranked sixth in the preliminaries of the 200 metre breaststroke with a time of 2:34.47 and advanced to the evening final. With a time of 2:31.28 in the final, she placed sixth.

==== 2022 European Aquatics Championships ====
In early August, Vázquez was officially confirmed to compete for Spain at the 2022 European Aquatics Championships. She started off with a 4:46.72 in the preliminaries of the 400 metre individual medley on day three, qualifying for the final ranking seventh across all prelims heats, which ranked sixth out of the final qualifiers. She placed fifth in the final with a time of 4:42.40, finishing 2.34 seconds behind bronze medalist Freya Colbert of Great Britain. Two days later, in the preliminaries of the 200 metre individual medley, she ranked sixteenth with a time of 2:16.99 and qualified for the semifinals. She placed eleventh in the semifinals, finishing eighth in semifinal heat one with a time of 2:15.27.

==== 2022 Swimming World Cup ====
During the three days of competition at the 2022 FINA Swimming World Cup stop held in October in Berlin, Germany, Vázquez competed in six individual events, placing twenty-fourth in the 200 metre breaststroke with a 2:30.19, twenty-sixth in the 200m individual medley with a 2:16.86, thirty-fourth in the 200 metre backstroke with a 2:19.66, forth-ninth in the 100 metre breaststroke with a 1:11.12, forty-ninth in the 200 metre freestyle with a 2:03.43, and fifty-first in the 100m individual medley with a 1:05.60.

=== 2023 ===
At the 2023 Flanders Cup, held in January in Antwerp, Belgium, Vázquez won two medals, the first was a silver medal in the 200 metre breaststroke with a 2:34.42 and the second was a bronze medal in the 200 metre individual medley with a time of 2:18.98, which was 5.45 seconds behind gold medalist Marrit Steenbergen of the Netherlands. In March, at the 2023 Edinburgh International Swim Meet in Edinburgh, Scotland, she won the bronze medal in the 400 metre individual medley with a time of 4:44.24, sharing the podium with Katie Shanahan of Great Britain (gold medalist) and Ellen Walshe of Ireland (silver medalist). On 30 March, at the 2023 Spanish Open Championships in Palma de Mallorca, she won the gold medal in the 400 metre individual medley with a 2023 World Aquatics Championships qualifying time of 4:41.16. Two days later, she placed fourth in the 200 metre individual medley with a 2:15.90. The fifth and final day, she ranked eleventh in the preliminaries of the 200 metre breaststroke with a time of 2:38.31, qualified for the evening b-final, and withdrew from further competition in the event.

== International championships ==
Meet	100 breaststroke	200 breaststroke	200 medley	400 medley	4×100 mixed medley
Junior level
EJC 2018	9th	9th		4th	11th
YOG 2018	21st	5th	11th	—N/a	
EJC 2019		14th	6th	1st place, gold medalist(s)	
WJC 2019		15th	2nd place, silver medalist(s)	1st place, gold medalist(s)	
Senior level
EC 2020			23rd	11th	
MG 2022		6th	5th	3rd place, bronze medalist(s)	
EC 2022			16th	5th	

== Personal best times ==
=== Long course metres (50 m pool) ===
Event	Time	Meet	Location	Date	Notes	Ref
200 m breaststroke	2:27.65	2019 Spanish Spring Open Championships	Sabadell	7 April 2019		
200 m individual medley	2:13.43	2019 World Junior Championships	Budapest, Hungary	23 August 2019		
400 m individual medley	4:38.53	2019 World Junior Championships	Budapest, Hungary	20 August 2019	Former WJ	

Legend: WJ – World Junior record

=== Short course metres (25 m pool) ===
Event	Time	Meet	Location	Date	Ref
200 m breaststroke	2:25.84	2021 Spanish Short Course Championships	Palma de Mallorca	28 November 2021	
200 m individual medley	2:14.11	2021 Spanish Short Course Championships	Palma de Mallorca	27 November 2021	

== World records ==
=== World junior records ===
==== Long course metres (50 m pool) ====
No.	Event	Time	Meet	Location	Date	Age	Status	Ref
1	400 m individual medley	4:38.53	2019 World Junior Championships	Budapest, Hungary	20 August 2019	17	Former	

== Awards and honours ==
- Diario AS, Prospect Award: 2019
