= Barbora Seemanová =

Czech swimmer (born 2000)

- Seemanová at the 2018 Summer Youth Olympics

Personal information
- Full name: Barbora Seemanová
- Nationality: Czech
- Born: 1 April 2000 (age 26) Prague, Czech Republic
- Height: 1.70 m (5 ft 7 in)
- Weight: 56 kg (123 lb)

Sport
- Sport: Swimming
- Strokes: Freestyle
- Club: SK Motorlet Praha
Medal record
European Championships (LC)
Gold medal – first place	2020 Budapest	200 m freestyle
Gold medal – first place	2024 Belgrade	100 m freestyle
Gold medal – first place	2024 Belgrade	200 m freestyle
Gold medal – first place	2026 Paris	200 m freestyle
Silver medal – second place	2024 Belgrade	400 m freestyle
Bronze medal – third place	2024 Belgrade	200 m medley
European Championships (SC)
Silver medal – second place	2021 Kazan	200 m freestyle
Summer Youth Olympics
Gold medal – first place	2018 Buenos Aires	50 m freestyle
Gold medal – first place	2018 Buenos Aires	100 m freestyle
Bronze medal – third place	2018 Buenos Aires	200 m freestyle

Barbora Seemanová (married name Choupenitch; born 1 April 2000) is a Czech swimmer. She competed in the women's 200 metre freestyle event at the 2016 Summer Olympics and 2020 Summer Olympics.

== Early life ==
Seemanová graduated from the Czechoslovak Academy of Business in Prague.

== Career ==
At the 2015 European Games, Seemanová reached the finals of 100m freestyle. With the record of 200m freestyle swimming 1:58.14, she was nominated to the 2016 Summer Olympics, becoming the youngest Czech at 16 years old. In the 200m freestyle race, Seemanová finished 31st place with a time of 2:00.26. She was also a member of the 4×100 medley relay, but was disqualified.

At the 2017 European Junior Swimming Championships, Seemanová became the champion of the 50m freestyle course in a new Czech senior record of 25.06 s, holding records in the 50 to 200 m freestyle courses.

At the 2018 Summer Youth Olympics, Seemanová won a gold medal in the first start on the 100m freestyle track. In the second round, she took bronze on the 200m freestyle track in 1:58.25. Seemanová won the second gold medal in the last start in the 50 m freestyle.

== Personal life ==
Seemanová is married to the fencer Alexander Choupenitch, an Olympic bronze medallist from the 2020 Tokyo Olympics. The couple first publicly confirmed their relationship in December 2025 in an interview for the Czech edition of Forbes. The two also decided to jointly take over the management of their sporting careers, including their marketing rights and finances. In September 2026, Seemanová announced on social media that she had married Choupenitch.

Awards
Preceded by Michaela Hrubá; Filip Nepejchal	Czech Junior Athlete of the Year; 2018	Succeeded by Jonáš Forejtek
