= Anja Crevar =

Serbian swimmer (born 2000)

Personal information
- Nationality: Serbia
- Born: 24 May 2000 (age 26) Pančevo, Serbia, FR Yugoslavia
- Height: 164 cm (5 ft 5 in)

Sport
- Sport: Swimming
- Strokes: Medley, butterfly, freestyle, backstroke
- Club: UCAM Club Natación Fuensanta
Medal record
Women's swimming
Representing Serbia
European Championships (SC)
Silver medal – second place	2021 Kazan	400 m medley
Mediterranean Games
Silver medal – second place	2018 Tarragona	400 m medley
European U-23 Championships
Silver medal – second place	2023 Dublin	200 m butterfly
Silver medal – second place	2023 Dublin	400 m medley
Youth Olympic Games
Silver medal – second place	2018 Buenos Aires	200 m medley
World Junior Championships
Bronze medal – third place	2017 Indianapolis	400 m medley
European Games
Bronze medal – third place	2015 Baku	400 m medley
European Junior Championships
Gold medal – first place	2016 Hódmezővásárhely	400 m medley
Gold medal – first place	2017 Netanya	400 m medley
Silver medal – second place	2017 Netanya	200 m medley
Bronze medal – third place	2016 Hódmezővásárhely	200 m medley

Anja Crevar (Serbian Cyrillic: Ања Цревар; born 24 May 2000) is a Serbian swimmer, and a member of the UCAM Club Natación Fuensanta. She is the 2021 European Short Course Championships and 2018 Mediterranean Games silver medalist in the 400 metre individual medley. She won a silver medal at the 2018 Summer Youth Olympics in the 200 metre individual medley. She also represented Serbia at the 2016, 2020, and 2024 Summer Olympics.

== Career ==
Crevar began swimming when she was five years old and followed her older sister Aleksandra into the sport.

Crevar won a bronze medal at the 2015 European Games in the 400 metre individual medley. At the 2015 Junior World Championships held in Singapore, at the age of 15, she came in fifth place in the finals with a new national record in the 400 metre individual medley. With her time in the race, she qualified to represent Serbia at the 2016 Summer Olympics. She was the youngest athlete to represent Serbia at 16 years and 74 days old. She finished 27th in the 200 metre individual medley and 20th in the 400 metre individual medley.

Crevar won a bronze medal in the 400 metre individual medley at the 2017 World Junior Championships. Then at the 2018 Mediterranean Games, she won a silver medal in the 400 metre individual medley behind Spain's Catalina Corró. In October 2018, she won the silver medal in the 200 metre individual medley at the 2018 Youth Olympic Games in Buenos Aires, Argentina, behind gold medal winner Anastasia Gorbenko of Israel.

Crevar represented Serbia at the 2020 Summer Olympics, finishing 10th in the 400 metre individual medley and 26th in the 200 metre individual medley. She then competed at the 2021 European Short Course Championships and tied with Sara Franceschi for the silver medal in the 400 metre individual medley.

Crevar competed at the 2023 European U-23 Championships and won silver medals in the 200 metre butterfly and the 400 metre individual medley. In February 2024, she was placed fourth in the 400 metre individual medley at the 2024 World Aquatics Championships. She then represented Serbia at the 2024 Summer Olympics and finished 17th in the 200 metre butterfly and 16th in the 400 metre individual medley.
