= Agostina Hein =

Argentine swimmer (born 2008)

Personal information
- Full name: Agostina Hein
- Nationality: Argentina
- Born: April 24, 2008 (age 18) Campana, Buenos Aires, Argentina

Sport
- Sport: Swimming
- Strokes: Individual medley, freestyle
- Club: SER Natación Alto Rendimiento de Zárate
Medal record
Representing Argentina
Pan Pacific Championships
Bronze medal – third place	2026 Irvine	400 m medley
South American Games
Silver medal – second place	2022 Asunción	4×200 m freestyle
World Junior Championships
Gold medal – first place	2025 Otopeni	400 m medley
Silver medal – second place	2025 Otopeni	800 m freestyle
Bronze medal – third place	2023 Netanya	800 m freestyle
Junior Pan American Games
Gold medal – first place	2025 Luque	400 m freestyle
Gold medal – first place	2025 Luque	200 m medley
Gold medal – first place	2025 Luque	400 m medley

Agostina at the 2026 National Short Course Open in Buenos Aires

Agostina Hein (born 24 April 2008) is an Argentine swimmer specializing in individual medley and freestyle. She holds three South American records in 800 metres freestyle, 200 m medley, and 400 m medley. She won gold in the 400 m medley at the 2025 World Aquatics Junior Swimming Championships. At the 2026 Pan Pacific Swimming Championships, she finished third in the 400 m medley, breaking her own national and continental record.

She represented Argentina at the 2024 Summer Olympics, where she was the youngest athlete in the Argentina delegation at age 16.

== Career ==
Hein started swimming at age three and was competing by age seven with Club Ciudad de Campana. At age 11, she started working with coach Sebastián Montero, who she followed to SER Natación Alto Rendimiento de Zárate, her current club.

In 2022, at age 14, Hein participated in the 2022 South American Games, her first major international competition. She won silver in the 4 × 200 metre freestyle relay with the Argentine team.
