= Vivien Jackl =

Hungarian swimmer (born 2008)

Personal information
- National team: Hungary
- Born: 17 October 2008 (age 17) Budapest, Hungary

Sport
- Sport: Swimming
- Strokes: Individual medley
- Club: Tatabányai Vízmű
Medal record
Women's swimming
Representing Hungary
Event	1st	2nd	3rd
European Championships (LC)	1	1	0
European Junior Championships	3	0	2
Total	4	1	2
European Championships (LC)
Gold medal – first place	2024 Belgrade	1500 m freestyle
Silver medal – second place	2024 Belgrade	400 m medley
European Junior Championships
Gold medal – first place	2023 Belgrade	400 m medley
Gold medal – first place	2024 Vilnius	400 m medley
Gold medal – first place	2024 Vilnius	4 x 200 m freestyle
Gold medal – first place	2026 Munich	200 m butterfly
Silver medal – second place	2024 Vilnius	800 m freestyle
Silver medal – second place	2026 Munich	800 m freestyle
Silver medal – second place	2026 Munich	1500 m freestyle
Silver medal – second place	2026 Munich	400 m medley
Bronze medal – third place	2022 Otopeni	400 m medley
Bronze medal – third place	2024 Vilnius	1500 m freestyle
Bronze medal – third place	2025 Samorin	400 m medley
Bronze medal – third place	2025 Samorin	1500 m freestyle
European Youth Olympic Festival
Gold medal – first place	2023 Maribor	400 m medley
Silver medal – second place	2023 Maribor	800 m freestyle
Silver medal – second place	2023 Maribor	200 m backstroke

Vivien Jackl (born 17 October 2008) is a Hungarian competitive swimmer. She is a 2022 European Junior Championships bronze medalist in the 400-metre individual medley and semi-finalist in the 200-metre backstroke and 200-metre butterfly. At the 2022 World Junior Championships, she placed sixth in the finals of the 200-metre butterfly and the 400-metre individual medley and seventh in the final of the 1500-metre freestyle.

== Background ==
Jackl was born 17 October 2008 in Budapest, Hungary, and competes for swim club Tatabányai Vízmű.

== Career ==
=== 2021–2022: European junior medalist at 13 years of age ===
In June 2021, 12-year-old Jackl set a Hungarian age group record at the 2021 Hungarian National Youth Championships in Kaposvár with a time of 4:46.47 in the 400-metre individual medley, breaking the former mark set by Krisztina Egerszegi in 1987. While her time was fast enough for the 2021 European Junior Swimming Championships, she was ineligible to compete as she was too young, she was 13 years of age at the end of the calendar year and competition had a minimum age of 14 years of age for female competitors.

==== 2022 European Junior Championships ====
The following year, at the 2022 European Junior Swimming Championships, held in July in Otopeni, Romania, Jackl won the bronze medal in the 400-metre individual medley at 13 years, 261 days of age with a time of 4:47.51, finishing 1.12 seconds behind gold medalist Emma Carrasco of Spain and 0.14 seconds ahead of fourth-place finisher Lisa Nystrand of Sweden. She also placed ninth in the semifinals of the 200-metre butterfly with a personal best time of 2:15.18, twelfth in the 400-metre freestyle in 4:20.86, thirteenth in the semifinals of the 200-metre backstroke with a time of 2:17.62, and 29th in the 200-metre individual medley with a 2:24.56.

==== 2022 World Junior Championships ====
Jackl entered to compete in at the 2022 FINA World Junior Swimming Championships, held starting 30 August in Lima, Peru, along with fourteen other Hungarian swimmers. Leading up to the Championships, she was highlighted by SwimSwam for one of the top five storylines to follow in girls' competition, specifically who would make the podium in the 400-metre individual medley. On the first day of competition, she ranked sixth in the preliminary heats of the 400-metre individual medley with a 4:51.48, qualifying for the evening final. In the final, she placed sixth with a time of 4:52.23, finishing less than 15 seconds behind gold medalist Mio Narita of Japan. In the morning on day two, she was the only Hungarian to compete in the preliminaries of the 200-metre butterfly and qualified for the final ranking seventh with a time of 2:17.80. She improved her time to a 2:16.16 in the final and placed sixth. The third day, she neared her personal best time in the preliminaries of the 200-metre backstroke with a time of 2:17.97 and placed tenth. Finishing in a time of 17:03.15 in the final of the 1500-metre freestyle on the fifth day, she placed seventh in the event.

==== End of the year competitions ====
In early December, and less than two months after she turned fourteen years old, Jackl achieved a personal best time of 2:14.25 in the 200-metre butterfly at the 2022 Central European Countries Junior Meet in Prague, Czech Republic, finishing 0.10 seconds behind the first-place finisher and winning the silver medal.

Over the course of the ensuing six days, at the 2022 Hungarian Junior National Short Course Championships contested in Szeged, Jackl swam personal best times in eight b-finals for individual events (which were the only finals open to female swimmers born in 2007 or 2008, she was born in 2008), starting on day one with a b-final third-place finish in 2:16.85 in the 200-metre individual medley. She followed up later in the session with a b-final win in a Hungarian age group record for girls 14 years of age in the 1500-metre freestyle with a 16:21.20, finishing 30.47 seconds ahead of the second-place finisher. Finishing in a personal best time of 2:13.81 in the 200-metre butterfly the following day, she placed second in the b-final. With a personal best time of 4:13.79 in the 400-metre freestyle later in the same session, she won the b-final.

The third day of the Championships, Jackl placed fourth in the b-final of the 200-metre freestyle with a personal best time of 2:05.10 before going on to win the b-final of the 400-metre individual medley with a personal best time of 4:43.95. On the fourth and final day, she swam a seventh personal best time in a b-final for an individual event, the 200-metre backstroke, placing fourth in the b-final with a 2:14.57. For the 800-metre freestyle later in the session, she won the b-final with a personal best time of 8:35.87, which was 13.77 seconds ahead of the second-place finisher and 6.28 seconds behind the Hungarian age group record for girls 14 years of age set by Judit Csabai on 12 December 1987.

=== 2023 ===
On the first day of the 2023 Hungarian National Championships in April in Kaposvár, 14-year-old Jackl placed fourth in the 1500-metre freestyle with a personal best time of 16:34.44, which was 20.15 seconds faster than her previous personal best time of 16:54.59 from the 2022 Hungarian Youth National Championships. She won the senior silver medal in the 400-metre individual medley on day three with a personal best and 2023 World Aquatics Championships "A" qualifying time of 4:42.96, lowering her previous personal best time by 3.51 seconds. She also achieved a personal best time of 8:43.80 in the final of the 800-metre freestyle on the fourth and final day, placing fourth overall.

== International championships (50 m) ==
Meet	400 freestyle	1500 freestyle	200 backstroke	200 butterfly	200 individual medley	400 individual medley
EJC 2022 (age: 13)	12th (4:20.86)		13th (2:17.62)	9th (2:15.18)	29th (2:24.56)	(bronze) (4:47.51)
WJC 2022 (age: 13)		7th (17:03.15)	10th (2:17.97)	6th (2:16.16)		6th (4:52.23)

== Personal best times ==
=== Long course meters (50 m pool) ===
Event	Time	Meet	Location	Date	Age	Ref
400 m freestyle	4:20.11	2022 Central European Countries Junior Meet	Prague, Czech Republic	3 December 2022	14	
800 m freestyle	8:26.91	2026 European Aquatics Championships	Paris, France	11 August 2026	17	
1500 m freestyle	16:34.44	2023 Hungarian National Championships	Kaposvár	19 April 2023	14	
200 m backstroke	2:17.62	2022 European Junior Swimming Championships	Otopeni, Romania	7 July 2022	13	
200 m butterfly	2:14.25	2022 Central European Countries Junior Meet	Prague, Czech Republic	4 December 2022	14	
400 m individual medley	4:34.96	2024 Hungarian National Championships	Budapest	11 April 2024	15	

=== Short course metres (25 m pool) ===
Event	Time		Meet	Location	Date	Age	Ref
200 m freestyle	2:05.10	b	2022 Hungarian Junior National Short Course Championships	Szeged	9 December 2022	14	
400 m freestyle	4:13.79	b	2022 Hungarian Junior National Short Course Championships	Szeged	8 December 2022	14	
800 m freestyle	8:35.87	b	2022 Hungarian Junior National Short Course Championships	Szeged	10 December 2022	14	
1500 m freestyle	16:21.20	b	2022 Hungarian Junior National Short Course Championships	Szeged	7 December 2022	14	
200 m backstroke	2:14.57	b	2022 Hungarian Junior National Short Course Championships	Szeged	10 December 2022	14	
200 m butterfly	2:13.81	b	2022 Hungarian Junior National Short Course Championships	Szeged	8 December 2022	14	
200 m individual medley	2:16.85	b	2022 Hungarian Junior National Short Course Championships	Szeged	7 December 2022	14	
400 m individual medley	4:43.95	b	2022 Hungarian Junior National Short Course Championships	Szeged	9 December 2022	14	

Legend: b – b-final (only final available for competitors born in 2007 or 2008)
