= Ageha Tanigawa =

Japanese swimmer (born 2003)

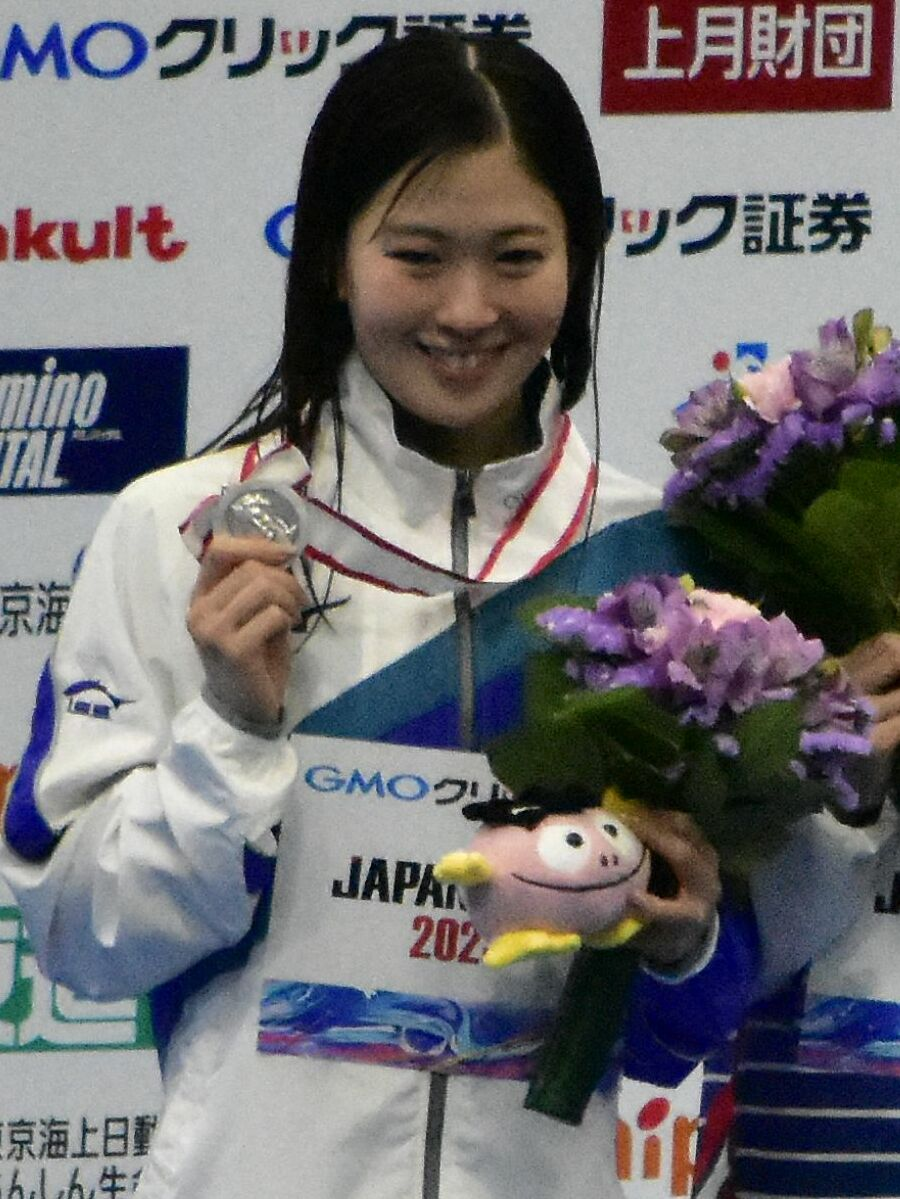

Personal information
- Nationality: Japan
- Born: 15 June 2003 (age 23) Osaka, Japan
- Height: 1.59 m (5 ft 3 in)

Sport
- Sport: Swimming
Medal record
Women's swimming
Representing Japan
Asian Games
Silver medal – second place	2022 Hangzhou	400m medley

Ageha Tanigawa (谷川亜華葉, Tanigawa Ageha, born 15 June 2003) is a Japanese swimmer. She competed in the 2020 Summer Olympics in the 400 m individual medley.
