= Zsuzsanna Jakabos =

Hungarian swimmer (born 1989)

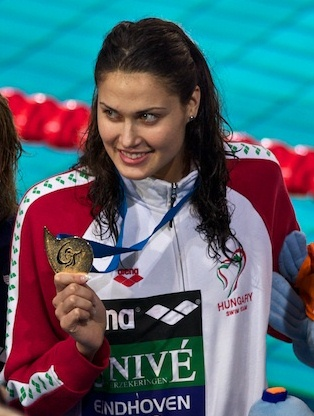
- Zsuzsanna Jakabos in 2012

Personal information
- Nationality: Hungary
- Born: 3 April 1989 (age 37) Pécs, Baranya, Hungary
- Height: 1.82 m (6 ft 0 in)
- Weight: 65 kg (143 lb)
- Spouse: Iván Petrov

Sport
- Sport: Swimming
- Strokes: Medley
- Club: Pécsi Atlétikai Club
- College team: University of Nevada, Las Vegas
Medal record
Women's swimming
Representing Hungary
European Championships (LC)
Gold medal – first place	2016 London	4 × 200 m freestyle
Gold medal – first place	2024 Belgrade	4 × 100 m freestyle
Silver medal – second place	2010 Budapest	200 m butterfly
Silver medal – second place	2012 Debrecen	200 m butterfly
Silver medal – second place	2012 Debrecen	400 m medley
Silver medal – second place	2012 Debrecen	4 × 200 m freestyle
Silver medal – second place	2020 Budapest	4 × 200 m freestyle
Silver medal – second place	2022 Rome	400 m medley
Silver medal – second place	2024 Belgrade	4 × 200 m freestyle
Bronze medal – third place	2010 Budapest	400 m medley
Bronze medal – third place	2014 Berlin	4 × 200 m freestyle
Bronze medal – third place	2016 London	400 m medley
Bronze medal – third place	2016 London	4 × 100 m mixed medley
Bronze medal – third place	2022 Rome	4 × 200 m freestyle
Bronze medal – third place	2024 Belgrade	400 m medley
European Championships (SC)
Gold medal – first place	2010 Eindhoven	200 m butterfly
Gold medal – first place	2010 Eindhoven	400 m medley
Silver medal – second place	2011 Szczecin	100 m medley
Silver medal – second place	2012 Chartres	100 m medley
Silver medal – second place	2019 Glasgow	400 m medley
Bronze medal – third place	2005 Trieste	400 m medley
Bronze medal – third place	2009 Istanbul	400 m medley
Bronze medal – third place	2011 Szczecin	400 m medley
Bronze medal – third place	2012 Chartres	200 m medley
Bronze medal – third place	2012 Chartres	400 m medley
Women's lifesaving
World Games
Gold medal – first place	2022 Birmingham	4 × 50 m obstacle
Silver medal – second place	2022 Birmingham	4 × 50 m medley

Zsuzsanna "Zsu" Jakabos (born 3 April 1989) is a Hungarian swimmer. She competed at the 2004, 2008, 2012 and 2016 Olympics in seven events in total, with the best achievement of sixth place in the 4 × 200 m freestyle relay in 2008 and 2016.

In 2019 Jakabos was member of the 2019 International Swimming League representing Team Iron.

== Awards ==
- Hungarian swimmer of the Year (1): 2005
- Cross of Merit of the Republic of Hungary – Bronze Cross (2008)

== Private life ==
She is married to her swimming coach Iván Petrov.
