= Emma Weyant =

American swimmer (born 2001)

Personal information
- National team: United States
- Born: December 24, 2001 (age 24) Sarasota, Florida, U.S.
- Height: 5 ft 8 in (173 cm)

Sport
- Sport: Swimming
- Strokes: Medley, freestyle
- College team: Virginia Cavaliers, Florida Gators
- Coach: Brent Arckey
Medal record
Women's swimming
Representing the United States
Event	1st	2nd	3rd
Olympic Games	0	1	1
World Championships (LC)	0	0	1
World Championships (SC)	0	1	0
Total	0	2	2
Olympic Games
Silver medal – second place	2020 Tokyo	400 m medley
Bronze medal – third place	2024 Paris	400 m medley
World Championships (LC)
Bronze medal – third place	2022 Budapest	400 m medley
World Championships (SC)
Silver medal – second place	2021 Abu Dhabi	4×200 m freestyle
Junior Pan Pacific Championships
Gold medal – first place	2018 Suva	400 m medley
Bronze medal – third place	2018 Suva	800 m freestyle

Emma Weyant (born December 24, 2001) is an American competitive swimmer. At the 2020 Olympic Games, she won the silver medal in the 400 m individual medley, and she won the bronze medal in the same event at the 2024 Olympic Games.

== Career ==
Weyant was born in 2001 to Kristi Cardoni-Weyant and James Weyant. She has three sisters. Weyant grew up in Sarasota, Florida, and swam for the Sarasota Sharks while attending Riverview High School.

At the 2018 Junior Pan Pacific Championships in August, Weyant won the gold medal in the 400 m individual medley with a time of 4:40.64 and the bronze medal in the 800 m freestyle with a time of 8:38.88.

At the 2020 U.S. Olympic Trials in June 2021, Weyant won the 400 m individual medley to qualify for the Olympic team. The following month, at the 2020 Olympic Games, Weyant won the silver medal in the 400 m individual medley.

At the 2021 World Championships (25m) in December, Weyant finished fourth in the 400 m individual medley, she finished seventh in the 800 m freestyle, and she did not qualify for the final in the 400 m freestyle. In the women's 4 × 200 m freestyle relay, she swam in the heats, and the U.S. team won in the final, earning her a silver medal.

Weyant spent her NCAA freshman season of 2021–22 at the University of Virginia. At the 2022 NCAA Division I Championships in March, she won the silver medal in the 500 y freestyle with a personal best time of 4:34.99. She finished second behind transgender athlete Lia Thomas. Weyant also finished fourth in the 400 y individual medley and won a silver medal in the 800 y freestyle relay.

In June, Weyant competed at the 2022 World Championships and won the bronze medal in the 400 m individual medley.

Weyant transferred to the University of Florida for her sophomore season of 2022–23. At the 2023 NCAA Division I Championships in March, she won the bronze medal in the 400 y individual medley, she finished sixth in the 500 y freestyle, and she finished 13th in the 1650 y freestyle.

At the 2024 NCAA Division I Championships in March, Weyant won a gold medal in the 800 y freestyle relay. She won the silver medal in the 500 y freestyle in a one-two finish with teammate Bella Sims. Weyant also won the silver medal in the 400 y individual medley. She finished fifth in the 1650 y freestyle. In May, she graduated from the University of Florida with a degree in political science.

At the 2024 U.S. Olympic Trials in June, Weyant won the silver medal in the 400 m individual medley, qualifying for the Olympic team. At the 2024 Olympic Games in July, she won the bronze medal in the 400 m individual medley.
