= Cyrielle Duhamel =

French swimmer (born 2000)

Personal information
- National team: France
- Born: 6 January 2000 (age 26) France
- Height: 173

Sport
- Sport: Swimming
- Strokes: Individual medley
- Club: Stade Béthunois Pelican Club
- Coached by: Gregory Lefebvre Julien Adriansen
Medal record
Representing France
Youth Olympic Games
Bronze medal – third place	2018 Buenos Aires	200 m medley
World Junior Championships
Bronze medal – third place	2017 Indianapolis	200 m medley
European Junior Championships
Bronze medal – third place	2017 Netanya	400 m medley

Cyrielle Duhamel (born 6 January 2000) is a French medley swimmer.

In 2017, after a bronze medal at the European Junior Championships on the 400IM, she wins another bronze medal at the Junior World Championships on the 200IM just a month after.

In 2018 she participates to the Youth Olympic Games in Buenos Aires and win a bronze medal on the 200IM.

It is in 2021 that Cyrielle wins the French title on the 200IM and qualifies herself for the Summer Olympics in Tokyo. The French athlete of 21 years old goes to the semi-final and fail for only 25 hundredth to enter the final. Nevertheless, she improved her personal record to 2'10"84 which is the second best time of the 200IM in France after Camille Muffat.

== Competition results ==
=== International results ===
Meet	200 IM
Tokyo 2020	11th of the semi-finals (2'10"84)

=== National results ===
- Championnats de France 2016 in Montpellier :
  - (bronze) 400 IM
- Championnats de France en petit bassin 2016 in Angers :
  - (silver) 400IM
- Championnats de France 2017 à Schiltigheim :
  - (silver) 200IM
  - (silver) 400IM
- Championnats de France en petit bassin 2017 in Montpellier :
  - (bronze) 400IM
- Championnats de France 2018 in Saint-Raphaël :
  - (silver) 200m Backstroke
  - (silver) 200IM
  - (silver) 400IM
- Championnats de France en petit bassin 2018 in Montpellier :
  - (silver) 200 Butterfly
  - (silver) 200IM
  - (bronze) 400IM
- Championnats de France 2019 in Rennes :
  - (silver) 200IM
  - (bronze) 400IM
- Championnats de France en petit bassin 2019 in Angers :
  - (gold) 100m Breaststroke
  - (silver) 200IM
  - (bronze) 200m Breastroke
- Championnats de France 2020 in Saint-Raphaël :
  - (gold) 100m Backstroke
  - (silver) 200IM
  - (bronze) 100m Breaststroke
- Championnats de France 2021 à Chartres :
  - (gold) 200IM
  - (silver) 200m Backstroke
