= Lisa Nystrand =

Swedish swimmer

Personal information
- National team: Sweden
- Born: 15 May 2006 (age 20) Sweden

Sport
- Sport: Swimming
- Strokes: Individual medley, backstroke, breaststroke
- Club: SK Neptun (current), Väsby SS (former)
Medal record
Silver medal – second place	2023 Belgrade	400 m medley

Lisa Nystrand (born 15 May 2006) is a Swedish competitive swimmer. At the 2022 European Aquatics Championships, she placed tenth in the semifinals of the 200-metre individual medley and twelfth in the 400-metre individual medley. She placed fourteenth in the semifinals of the 200-metre backstroke at the 2021 European Short Course Championships. At the 2021 European Junior Championships, she placed sixth in the final of the 200-metre individual medley, eighth in the final of the 400-metre individual medley, and tenth in the semifinals of the 200-metre breaststroke.

== Background ==
Nystrand was born 15 May 2006 in Sweden and formerly competed for Väsby SS. She currently competes for Simklubben Neptun (SK Neptun).

== Career ==
=== 2020–2021 ===
In June 2020, at the senior Swedish National Championships, conducted in a virtual format, Nystrand won gold medals and nationals titles in the 200-metre breaststroke, 200-metre individual medley, and 400-metre individual medley, as well as a silver medal in the 200-metre backstroke. The following year, in April at the Swedish Swim Open, she qualified for her first senior LEN European Aquatics Championships at 15 years of age, achieving a qualifying time of 2:15.46 in the 200-metre individual medley for both the senior and junior European Championships of the year. Her time of 2:15.46 was 1.08 seconds faster than the Olympic selection time in the event for the 2020 Summer Olympics (2:16.54) and was achieved before the end of the qualifying period, which closed on 27 June.

At the 2020 European Aquatics Championships, held in May at Danube Arena in Budapest, Hungary, Nystrand placed 26th in the 200-metre individual medley with a time of 2:16.34, which was again faster than the 2020 Summer Olympics selection time and was attained in the qualifying period. In her other event, the 200-metre backstroke, she placed 28th, finishing in a time of 2:17.50. While her 200-metre individual medley times from April (2:15.46) and May (2:16.34) were both faster than the Olympic selection time of 2:16.54 and were both attained before 27 June, the International Olympic Committee invited no female Swedish swimmers to compete in the event for Team Sweden at the 2020 Olympic Games. Two months later, in July at the 2021 European Junior Swimming Championships held in Rome, Italy, she placed sixth in the final of the 200-metre individual medley with a 2:15.08, eighth in the final of the 400-metre individual medley with a 4:50.04, tenth in the semifinals of the 200-metre breaststroke with a personal best time of 2:31.65, fourteenth in the 4×100-metre medley relay, swimming the backstroke leg of the relay, 34th in the 100-metre backstroke with a 1:05.70, and did not start the 200-metre backstroke.

For the 2021 European Short Course Swimming Championships, contested at the Palace of Water Sports in Kazan, Russia in November, Nystrand achieved a fourteenth-place finish in the semifinals of the 200-metre backstroke with a personal best time of 2:09.85, after a personal best time of 2:10.78 in the preliminary heats, and a seventeenth-place finish in the 200-metre individual medley with a personal best time of 2:13.16. She also placed sixteenth in the 400-metre individual medley with a personal best time of 4:41.12.

=== 2022 ===
The following year, as a 16-year-old at the 2022 European Junior Swimming Championships held in July in Otopeni, Romania, Nystrand competed in seven events, including placing fourth in the final of the 200-metre individual medley with a 2:14.84, fourth in the final of the 400-metre individual medley with a 4:47.65, twelfth in the semifinals of the 200-metre backstroke with a personal best time of 2:17.13, and 20th in the 200-metre breaststroke with a 2:35.54.

==== 2022 European Aquatics Championships ====
At the 2022 European Aquatics Championships, held in August at Foro Italico in Rome, Italy, Nystrand placed 25th in her first event of the Championships, the 200-metre backstroke, with a time of 2:17.84. In her second event, the 400-metre individual medley, she placed twelfth with a time of 4:50.40. For her third and final event of the Championships, the 200-metre individual medley, she advanced past the preliminaries for the first time at a LEN European Aquatics Championships, qualifying for the evening semifinals. In the semifinals of the event, she placed tenth with a personal best time of 2:14.64 and did not qualify for the final.

=== 2023 ===
On day one of the 2023 Stockholm Swim Open, 13 April, Nystrand placed fourth in the b-final of the 200-metre freestyle with a 2023 European Junior Swimming Championships qualifying time of 2:04.70. The following day, she won the 400 metre individual medley with another qualifying time, 4:50.84. On the third morning, she ranked ninth in the preliminaries of the 200-metre breaststroke with a time of 2:33.35 before withdrawing from further competition in the event. In the evening session, she placed fourth in the final of the 200-metre individual medley with a time of 2:17.27. In the 100-metre breaststroke preliminaries on the fourth and final day of competition, she ranked tenth with a time of 1:11.09 and withdrew from further competition in the event.

== International championships (50 m) ==
Meet	100 backstroke	200 backstroke	200 breaststroke	200 medley	400 medley	4×100 freestyle	4×100 medley	4×100 mixed freestyle
Junior level
EJC 2021 (age: 15)	34th (1:05.70)	DNS	10th (2:31.65)	6th (2:15.08)	8th (4:50.04)		14th (4:17.08)	
EJC 2022 (age: 16)		12th (2:17.13)	20th (2:35.54)	4th (2:14.84)	4th (4:47.65)	10th (3:54.43)	11th (4:18.08)	12th (3:40.96)
Senior level
EC 2020 (age: 15)		28th (2:17.50)		26th (2:16.34)				
EC 2022 (age: 16)		25th (2:17.84)		10th (2:14.64)	12th (4:50.40)			

== International championships (25 m) ==
Meet	200 backstroke	200 medley	400 medley
EC 2021 (age: 15)	14th (2:09.85)	18th (2:13.16)	16th (4:41.12)

== Personal best times ==
=== Long course metres (50 m pool) ===
Event	Time		Meet	Location	Date	Age	Ref
200 m backstroke	2:17.13	sf	2022 European Junior Swimming Championships	Otopeni, Romania	7 July 2022	16	
100 m breaststroke	1:09.84		2023 Helsinki Swim Meet	Finland	8 April 2023	16	
200 m breaststroke	2:30.88		2023 Helsinki Swim Meet	Finland	9 April 2023	16	
200 m individual medley	2:14.64	sf	2022 European Aquatics Championships	Rome, Italy	15 August 2022	16	
400 m individual medley	4:47.47	h	2021 European Junior Swimming Championships	Rome, Italy	6 July 2021	15	

Legend: h – preliminary heat; sf – semifinal

=== Short course metres (25 m pool) ===
Event	Time		Meet	Location	Date	Age	Ref
200 m backstroke	2:09.85	sf	2021 European Short Course Swimming Championships	Kazan, Russia	3 November 2021	15	
200 m breaststroke	2:23.50		2022 Nordic Short Course Swimming Championships	Norway	10 December 2022	16	
200 m individual medley	2:10.28		2022 Nordic Short Course Swimming Championships	Norway	12 December 2022	16	
400 m individual medley	4:38.09		2022 Nordic Short Course Swimming Championships	Norway	11 December 2022	16	

Legend: sf – semifinal
