= Lea Polonsky =

Israeli swimmer (born 2002)

Lea Polonsky לאה פולונסקי
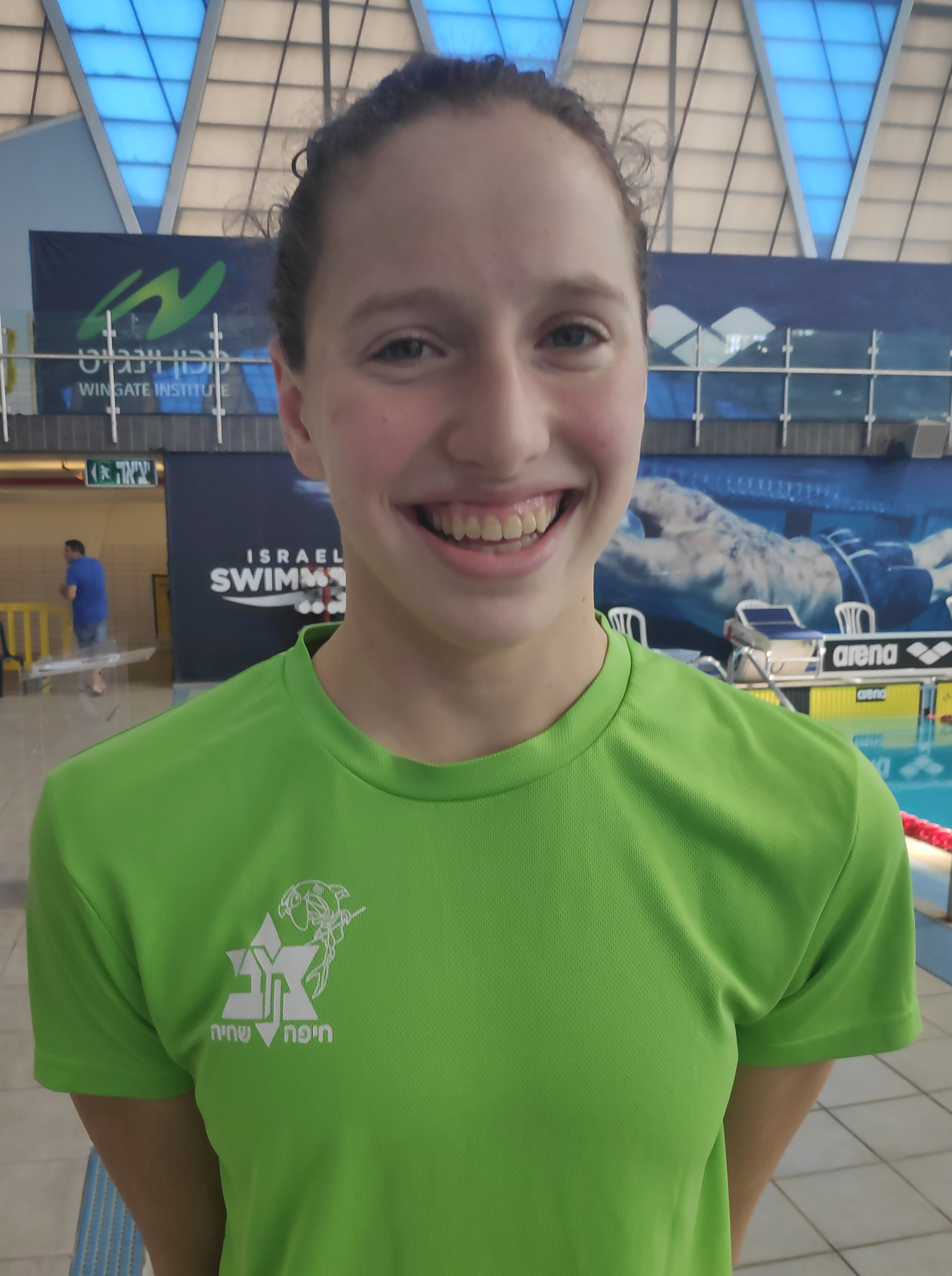
- Polonsky in 2019

Personal information
- Nationality: Israeli
- Born: 25 May 2002 (age 24) Haifa, Israel
- Height: 5 ft 11 in (180 cm)

Sport
- Sport: Swimming
- Club: Maccabi Haifa
- College team: University of California, Berkeley
Medal record
Women's swimming
Representing Israel
European Championships (LC)
| Gold medal – first place | 2024 Belgrade | 4×200m freestyle |
| Silver medal – second place | 2024 Belgrade | 200m medley |
European Junior Championships
| Bronze medal – third place | 2019 Kazan | 200m IM |
European Youth Olympics
| Silver medal – second place | 2017 Győr | 200m Medley |
| Silver medal – second place | 2017 Győr | mixed 4×100m Medley Relay |

Lea Polonsky (Hebrew: לאה פולונסקי; born 25 May 2002) is an Israeli swimmer. At the 2017 European Youth Olympics she won silver medals in the 200m Medley and the mixed 4 × 100 m Medley Relay. At the 2019 European Junior Swimming Championships she won a bronze medal in the 200 IM, and at the 2024 European Aquatics Championships she won a gold medal in the 4 × 200 m freestyle relay, and the silver medal in the 200m medley. Polonsky represented Israel at the 2024 Paris Olympics in the Women's 200 metre freestyle, the 200 metre individual medley, and the 4×200 metre freestyle relay.

== Early and personal life ==
Her hometown is Haifa, Israel, and her parents, Anna and Oleg, are computer science engineers. She was a ballroom dancer for five years as a young child. Her brother Ron Polonsky, who is 14 months older than she is, is a competitive swimmer as well, and competed for Israel at the 2020 Tokyo Olympics. They also have two younger siblings.

She attended Ironi Hey High School. She is 5' 11" tall.

== Swimming career ==
Her club is Maccabi Haifa.

=== Early years; European Youth Olympics silver medals ===
At the 2017 European Youth Summer Olympic Festival in Győr, Hungary in July, she won silver medals in the 200m Medley (2:16.19) and the mixed 4 × 100 m Medley Relay. At the Israel Swimming Cup 2017 in April at 14 years old, she won the 200m Medley (2:17.78).

At the 2018 European Junior Swimming Championships in Finland in July, she came in 4th in the Mixed 4 × 100 m Freestyle Relay. At the 2018 ATUS Trophy in Graz, Austria, in April at 15 years of age, she won a gold medal in the 200m Breaststroke (2:32.77), and a silver in the 200m Medley (2:15.65).

=== 2019–21; European Junior Championship bronze medal ===
At the 2019 European Junior Swimming Championships in Kazan, Russia, she won a bronze medal in the 200 IM (2:14.29). At the 2019 ATUS Trophy in Graz, Austria, in April at 16 years of age, she won a silver medal in the 100m Butterfly (1:02.04), and a bronze medal in the Mixed 4×50m Freestyle Relay (1:40.83). At the 2019 Swim Cup Amsterdam in the Netherlands in December, she won a silver medal in the 200 L IM in 2:14.28.

At the 2020 Rotterdam Qualification Meet in December in the Netherlands, she won the silver medal in the 200 L IM with a time of 2:13.26.

At the 2021 Malmsten Swim Open Stockholm in Sweden in April, she won a gold medal in the 4 × 200 m Freestyle Relay (8:06.91), and a bronze medal in the Women 4 × 100 m Freestyle Relay (3:41.6).

=== 2022–23; Pac-12 championships ===
She attends the University of California, Berkeley, where she majors in computer science while considering a pre-med path, and swims for the California Golden Bears.

At the 2022 NCAA Championships, she swam anchor on Cal's third-place 800 free relay. At the 2022 Pac-12 championships she won silver medals in the 400 IM (4:03.90), and in the 800 free relay.

She represented Israel at the 2022 World Aquatics Championships held in Budapest, Hungary. She reached the semifinals in the women's 200 metre butterfly event.

She won the 2023 Pac-12 championships in both the 200 individual medley (1:54.02) and the 400 individual medley (4:05.27), and earned First Team All-America honors in the 800 freestyle relay and Second Team honors in both the 200 and 400 IM. At the 2023 NCAA Championships, she swam on Cal's 800 free relay team that placed fourth.

At the 2023 Mare Nostrum Monaco in May, she won gold medals in the 200m L IM (2:13.32) and the 400m L IM (4:47.53).

=== 2024–present; European Championship gold and silver medals ===
At the 2024 Pacific 12 Championships in February, she won the silver medal in the 200 Y IM with a time of 1:53.58, and the bronze medal in the 400 Y IM with a time of 4:05.11.

At the 2024 2024 European Aquatics Championships in Belgrade in June, she won a gold medal in the 4 × 200 m freestyle relay, and the silver medal in the 200m medley with a time of 2:11:18.

As of June 2024, her personal best in the 200m individual medley is 2:11.18, and her personal best in the 200m freestyle is 01:58.89.

=== 2024 Paris Olympics ===
Polonsky represented Israel at the 2024 Paris Olympics in the Women's 200 metre freestyle, the 200 metre individual medley, and the 4×200 metre freestyle relay.

== See also ==
- List of Israeli records in swimming
- List of European Aquatics Championships medalists in swimming (women)
