= Maria Ugolkova =

Swiss swimmer (born 1989)

Personal information
- Native name: Мария Юрьевна Уголькова
- Nationality: Swiss
- Born: 18 July 1989 (age 37) Moscow, Soviet Union

Sport
- Sport: Swimming
- Strokes: Medley
- Club: Swimming Club Uster Wallisellen
Medal record
European Championships (LC)
Bronze medal – third place	2018 Glasgow	200 m medley
European Championships (SC)
Silver medal – second place	2019 Glasgow	200 m medley
Silver medal – second place	2021 Kazan	200 m medley

Maria Ugolkova (Russian: Мария Юрьевна Уголькова; born 18 July 1989) is a Swiss swimmer specializing in the 200 metres medley. She currently represents Switzerland while competing as well as the SCUW club, based near Zurich, Switzerland.

== Career ==
Ugolkova holds multiple Swiss Swimming National Records, including the 200 Freestyle, 200 Backstroke, 100 Butterfly, 100 Medley, 200 Medley, and many more relay records both in short course pools and long course pools. She also holds multiple Swiss Championship Records, Swiss Team Championship Records, French-speaking Region Swiss Records, and Central-east german-speaking Region Swiss Records.

She participated at the 2016 Rio Summer Olympics, swimming the women's 4x100m freestyle relay, 100m freestyle, and 200m individual medley, representing the Swiss Olympic Team.

She also swam in the 200m individual medley at the 2018 European Championships in Glasgow, and came third during the final, swimming a time of 2:10.83. First place went to Katinka Hosszú from Hungary and second went to Ilaria Cusinato of Italy.

== See also ==
- List of European Aquatics Championships medalists in swimming (women)
- List of European Short Course Swimming Championships medalists (women)

== Awards and honours ==
- FINA, Top 10 Moments: 2021 Swimming World Cup (#8)
