= Freya Colbert =

English swimmer (born 2004)

Personal information
- Full name: Freya Constance Colbert
- Born: 8 March 2004 (age 22) Grantham, Lincolnshire, England
- Height: 1.81 m (5 ft 11 in)

Sport
- Country: Great Britain/England
- Sport: Swimming
- Events: Freestyle, individual medley
- University team: Loughborough University
- Club: Nova Centurion
Medal record
Women's swimming
Representing Great Britain
World Championships (LC)
Gold medal – first place	2024 Doha	400 m medley
Silver medal – second place	2024 Doha	4×200 m freestyle
European Championships (LC)
Gold medal – first place	2022 Rome	4×200 m mixed freestyle
Gold medal – first place	2026 Paris	4×200 m freestyle
Gold medal – first place	2026 Paris	4×200 m mixed freestyle
Gold medal – first place	2026 Paris	4×100 m medley
Silver medal – second place	2022 Rome	4×200 m freestyle
Bronze medal – third place	2022 Rome	400 m medley
Bronze medal – third place	2026 Paris	200 m freestyle
European Championships (SC)
Silver medal – second place	2023 Otopeni	400 m medley
Bronze medal – third place	2023 Otopeni	200 m freestyle
Bronze medal – third place	2025 Lublin	200 m freestyle
Bronze medal – third place	2025 Lublin	400 m freestyle
European Junior Championships
Silver medal – second place	2019 Kazan	4x200 m freestyle
European Youth Olympic Festival
Silver medal – second place	2019 Baku	200 m freestyle
Silver medal – second place	2019 Baku	400 m freestyle
Silver medal – second place	2019 Baku	800 m freestyle
Silver medal – second place	2019 Baku	4x100 m freestyle
Representing England
Commonwealth Games
Bronze medal – third place	2022 Birmingham	4×200 m freestyle

Freya Constance Colbert (born 8 March 2004) is an English international swimmer. Representing Great Britain, she is the 2024 World Championship gold medalist in the 400 metres individual medley. She has represented England at the Commonwealth Games (winning a bronze) and competed at the 2024 Summer Olympics.

== Biography ==
Colbert was educated at Kesteven & Grantham Girls School and Loughborough University from 2022 to 2024.

She won three medals at the 2022 British Swimming Championships including a gold medal in the 400 metres individual medley. She consequently represented Great Britain at the 2022 World Aquatics Championships.

In 2022, she was selected for the 2022 Commonwealth Games in Birmingham, where she competed in three events; the women's 200 metres freestyle, finishing in 13th place, the women's 400 metres freestyle, the 400 metres individual medley where she just finished just outside of the medal places in 4th and the 4 x 200 metres freestyle relay, where she won a bronze medal.

In 2023, she won three gold medals at the 2023 British Swimming Championships in the 400 metres freestyle, the 800 metres freestyle and the 400 metres medley. It was the second time that she had won the medley title.

After winning the 200 metres freestyle and the 400 metres medley at the 2024 Aquatics GB Swimming Championships, Colbert sealed her place at the 2024 Summer Olympics. At the Olympics, Colbert just missed out on a medal after finishing fourth in the women's 400 metre individual medley final and fifth in the 200 metres freestyle relay final.

In 2025, Colbert successfully defended her 200 metres freestyle title at the 2025 Aquatics GB Swimming Championships, which sealed a qualification place for the 2025 World Aquatics Championships in Singapore. Subsequently, at the World Championships, she reached the final of the 200 metres freestyle.

== See also ==
- List of World Aquatics Championships medalists in swimming (women)
