= Sara Franceschi =

Italian swimmer (born 1999)

Personal information
- Nationality: Italian
- Born: 1 February 1999 (age 27) Livorno, Italy
- Height: 1.80 m (5 ft 11 in)

Sport
- Sport: Swimming
- Strokes: Individual medley
Medal record
Women's swimming
Representing Italy
World Championships (LC)
Bronze medal – third place	2024 Doha	400 m medley
World Championships (SC)
Silver medal – second place	2022 Melbourne	400 m medley
European Championships (LC)
Bronze medal – third place	2022 Rome	200 m medley
Mediterranean Games
Gold medal – first place	2022 Oran	200 m medley
Gold medal – first place	2022 Oran	400 m medley
Gold medal – first place	2026 Taranto	200 m medley
European Junior Championships
Silver medal – second place	2016 Hódmezővásárhely	200 m medley

Sara Franceschi (born 1 February 1999) is an Italian swimmer. She competed in the women's 400 metre individual medley event at the 2016 Summer Olympics. She competed at the 2020 Summer Olympics in 200 m individual medley and 400 m individual medley.

== Career ==
On day one of swimming competition at the 2022 Mediterranean Games, held in Oran, Algeria, Franceschi won the gold medal in the 400 metre individual medley with a time of 4:40.86. Three days later, she won her second gold medal of the Games, placing first in the 200 metre individual medley with a time of 2:12.19. The following month, at the 2022 European Aquatics Championships in Rome, she won the bronze medal in the 200 metre individual medley with a time of 2:11.38.

== See also ==
- List of European Aquatics Championships medalists in swimming (women)
- List of World Aquatics Championships medalists in swimming (women)
