= Ireland at the 2019 World Aquatics Championships =

- Flag of Ireland
- World Aquatics code: IRL
- National federation: Swim Ireland
- Website: www.swimireland.ie

in Gwangju, South Korea
- Medals: Gold 0 Silver 0 Bronze 0 Total 0

World Aquatics Championships appearances
- 1973; 1975; 1978; 1982; 1986; 1991; 1994; 1998; 2001; 2003; 2005; 2007; 2009; 2011; 2013; 2015; 2017; 2019; 2022; 2023; 2024; 2025

Ireland competed at the 2019 World Aquatics Championships in Gwangju, South Korea from 12 to 28 July.

== Diving ==
Ireland entered three divers.

Men

Athlete	Event	Preliminaries		Semifinals		Final	
Athlete	Event	Points	Rank	Points	Rank	Points	Rank
Oliver Dingley	1 m springboard	314.40	27	—N/a		Did not advance	
Oliver Dingley	3 m springboard	417.95	10 Q	358.95	18	Did not advance	

Women

Athlete	Event	Preliminaries		Semifinals		Final	
Athlete	Event	Points	Rank	Points	Rank	Points	Rank
Clare Cryan	1 m springboard	240.70	5 Q	—N/a		237.05	11
Clare Cryan	3 m springboard	250.25	23	Did not advance			
Tanya Watson	10 m platform	237.00	29	Did not advance			

Mixed

Athlete	Event	Final	
Athlete	Event	Points	Rank
Oliver Dingley; Clare Cryan	Synchronized 3 m springboard	266.49	12

== Swimming ==
Ireland entered 10 swimmers.

Men

Athlete	Event	Heat		Semifinal		Final	
Athlete	Event	Time	Rank	Time	Rank	Time	Rank
Curtis Coulter	100 m freestyle	50.86	61	Did not advance			
Conor Ferguson	50 m backstroke	25.60	28	Did not advance			
Conor Ferguson	200 m backstroke	2:02.37	33	Did not advance			
Darragh Greene	50 m breaststroke	26.94	8 Q	27.14	10	Did not advance	
Darragh Greene	100 m breaststroke	59.82	17	Did not advance			
Darragh Greene	200 m breaststroke	2:10.61	17	Did not advance			
Brendan Hyland	200 m butterfly	1:57.09	14 Q	1:56.55	11	Did not advance	
Brendan Hyland	200 m individual medley	DNS		Did not advance			
Shane Ryan	50 m backstroke	25.10	11 Q	WD		Did not advance	
Shane Ryan	100 m backstroke	54.24	21	Did not advance			
Jordan Sloan	200 m freestyle	1:48.60	=27	Did not advance			
Shane Ryan; Robert Powell; Jordan Sloan; Jack McMillan	4×100 m freestyle relay	3:17.38	20	—N/a		Did not advance	
Jack McMillan; Robert Powell; Jordan Sloan; Brendan Hyland	4×200 m freestyle relay	7:13.91 NR	16	—N/a		Did not advance	
Shane Ryan; Darragh Greene; Brendan Hyland; Jordan Sloan	4×100 m medley relay	3:35.86 NR	14	—N/a		Did not advance	

Women

Athlete	Event	Heat		Semifinal		Final	
Athlete	Event	Time	Rank	Time	Rank	Time	Rank
Niamh Coyne	50 m breaststroke	32.12	30	Did not advance			
Niamh Coyne	100 m breaststroke	1:10.16	=33	Did not advance			
Niamh Coyne	200 m breaststroke	DNS		Did not advance			
Ellen Walshe	100 m butterfly	1:00.85	35	Did not advance			

Mixed

Athlete	Event	Heat		Final	
Athlete	Event	Time	Rank	Time	Rank
Conor Ferguson; Niamh Coyne; Ellen Walshe; Robert Powell	4×100 m medley relay	3:53.69	19	Did not advance	
