= Ireland at the 2025 World Aquatics Championships =

- Flag of Ireland
- World Aquatics code: IRL
- National federation: Swim Ireland
- Website: swimireland.ie

in Singapore
- Competitors: 13 in 2 sports
- Medals: Gold 0 Silver 0 Bronze 0 Total 0

World Aquatics Championships appearances
- 1973; 1975; 1978; 1982; 1986; 1991; 1994; 1998; 2001; 2003; 2005; 2007; 2009; 2011; 2013; 2015; 2017; 2019; 2022; 2023; 2024; 2025

Ireland competed at the 2025 World Aquatics Championships in Singapore from July 11 to August 3, 2025.

== Competitors ==
The following is the list of competitors in the Championships.

| Sport | Men | Women | Total |
|---|---|---|---|
| Diving | 1 | 0 | 1 |
| Swimming | 8 | 4 | 12 |
| Total | 9 | 4 | 13 |

== Diving ==
Men

| Athlete | Event | Preliminaries | | Semifinals | | Final | |
| Athlete | Event | Points | Rank | Points | Rank | Points | Rank |
|---|---|---|---|---|---|---|---|
| Jake Passmore | 3 m springboard | 360.60 | 27 | Did not advance | | | |

== Swimming ==
Ireland entered 12 swimmers.

Men

| Athlete | Event | Heat | | Semi-final | | Final | |
| Athlete | Event | Time | Rank | Time | Rank | Time | Rank |
|---|---|---|---|---|---|---|---|
| Evan Bailey | 100 m freestyle | 49.52 | 37 | Did not advance | | | |
| Evan Bailey | 200 m freestyle | 1:46.66 =NR | 15 Q | 1:48.75 | 16 | Did not advance | |
| Jack Cassin | 100 m butterfly | 52.84 | 34 | Did not advance | | | |
| Jack Cassin | 200 m butterfly | 1:57.08 | 20 | Did not advance | | | |
| Eoin Corby | 100 m breaststroke | 1:00.63 | 21 | Did not advance | | | |
| Eoin Corby | 200 m breaststroke | 2:11.84 | 20 | Did not advance | | | |
| Thomas Fannon | 50 m freestyle | 21.87 | 14 Q | 21.81 | 12 | Did not advance | |
| Shane Ryan | 50 m backstroke | 24.96 | 19 | Did not advance | | | |
| Shane Ryan | 50 m butterfly | 23.46 | 28 | Did not advance | | | |
| John Shortt | 100 m backstroke | 54.26 | 26 | Did not advance | | | |
| John Shortt | 200 m backstroke | 1:56.98 | 14 Q | 1:57.30 | 15 | Did not advance | |
| Daniel Wiffen | 400 m freestyle | 3:47.57 | 16 | — | | Did not advance | |
| Daniel Wiffen | 800 m freestyle | 7:46.36 | 8 Q | — | | 7:58.56 | 8 |
| Daniel Wiffen | 1500 m freestyle | Did not start | | — | | Did not advance | |
| Evan Bailey; Cormac Rynn; Jack Cassin; John Shortt | 4 × 200 m freestyle relay | 7:16.70 | 14 | — | | Did not advance | |
| John Shortt; Eoin Corby; Jack Cassin; Evan Bailey | 4 × 100 m medley relay | 3:37.46 | 21 | — | | Did not advance | |

Women

| Athlete | Event | Heat | | Semi-final | | Final | |
| Athlete | Event | Time | Rank | Time | Rank | Time | Rank |
|---|---|---|---|---|---|---|---|
| Danielle Hill | 50 m freestyle | 25.24 | 25 | Did not advance | | | |
| Danielle Hill | 100 m freestyle | 56.59 | 37 | Did not advance | | | |
| Danielle Hill | 50 m backstroke | 27.84 | 10 Q | 27.71 | 12 | Did not advance | |
| Danielle Hill | 100 m backstroke | 1:00.79 | 18 | Did not advance | | | |
| Ellie McCartney | 200 m breaststroke | 2:25.22 | 8 Q | 2:23.79 | 6 Q | 2:25.22 | 7 |
| Ellie McCartney | 200 m individual medley | 2:13.86 | 25 | Did not advance | | | |
| Mona McSharry | 50 m breaststroke | 31.28 | 25 | Did not advance | | | |
| Mona McSharry | 100 m breaststroke | 1:05.99 | 1 Q | 1:06.33 | 11 | Did not advance | |
| Mona McSharry | 200 m breaststroke | Did not start | | Did not advance | | | |
| Ellen Walshe | 200 m butterfly | 2:09.15 | 7 Q | 2:07.48 NR | 4 Q | 2:08.34 | 8 |
| Ellen Walshe | 200 m individual medley | 2:11.45 | 10 Q | 2:10.49 NR | 8 Q | 2:11.57 | 8 |
| Ellen Walshe | 400 m individual medley | 4:38.72 | 9 | — | | Did not advance | |
