= Ireland at the 2024 World Aquatics Championships =

- Flag of Ireland
- World Aquatics code: IRL
- National federation: Swim Ireland
- Website: swimireland.ie

in Doha, Qatar
- Competitors: 16 in 2 sports
- Medals Ranked 12th: Gold 2 Silver 0 Bronze 0 Total 2

World Aquatics Championships appearances
- 1973; 1975; 1978; 1982; 1986; 1991; 1994; 1998; 2001; 2003; 2005; 2007; 2009; 2011; 2013; 2015; 2017; 2019; 2022; 2023; 2024; 2025

Ireland is competing at the 2024 World Aquatics Championships in Doha, Qatar from 2 to 18 February.

== Athletes by discipline ==
Ireland sent 16 athletes to compete in two disciplines:

Sport	Men	Women	Total
Diving	1	2	3
Swimming	8	5	13
Total	9	7	16

== Medallist ==
Medal	Name	Sport	Event	Date
1st place, gold medalist(s)	Daniel Wiffen	Swimming	Men's 800 metre freestyle	14 February 2024
1st place, gold medalist(s)	Daniel Wiffen	Swimming	Men's 1500 metre freestyle	18 February 2024

== Diving ==
Men

Athlete	Event	Preliminaries		Semifinals		Final	
Athlete	Event	Points	Rank	Points	Rank	Points	Rank
Jake Passmore	3 m springboard	374.15	17 Q	364.50	17	Did not advance	

Women

Athlete	Event	Preliminaries		Semifinals		Final	
Athlete	Event	Points	Rank	Points	Rank	Points	Rank
Clare Cryan	3 m springboard	199.05	44	Did not advance			
Ciara McGing	10 m platform	243.20	26	Did not advance			

Mixed

Athlete	Event	Final	
Athlete	Event	Points	Rank
Clare Cryan; Jake Passmore	3 m ыynchro springboard	249.12	12

== Swimming ==
Daniel Wiffen won the men's 800 metre freestyle to become Ireland's first-ever gold medallist at the World Aquatics Championships.

Men

Athlete	Event	Heat		Semifinal		Final	
Athlete	Event	Time	Rank	Time	Rank	Time	Rank
Tom Fannon	50 metre freestyle	22.23	=24	Did not advance			
Shane Ryan	100 metre freestyle	49.19	24	Did not advance			
Daniel Wiffen	400 metre freestyle	3:45.52	4 Q	—N/a		3:46.65	7
Daniel Wiffen	800 metre freestyle	7:46.90	2 Q	—N/a		7:40.94	1st place, gold medalist(s)
Daniel Wiffen	1500 metre freestyle	14:54.29	6 Q	—N/a		14:34.07 NR	1st place, gold medalist(s)
Conor Ferguson	50 metre backstroke	Did not start		Did not advance			
Conor Ferguson	100 metre backstroke	53.95	11 Q	53.90	13	Did not advance	
John Shortt	200 metre backstroke	1:59.27	16 Q	1:58.47	14	Did not advance	
Darragh Greene	50 metre breaststroke	27.76	18	Did not advance			
Darragh Greene	100 metre breaststroke	1:00.70	20	Did not advance			
Eoin Corby	200 metre breaststroke	2:13.10	17	Did not advance			
Shane Ryan	50 metre butterfly	23.83	26	Did not advance			
Max McCusker	100 metre butterfly	55.52	=16 LSO	Did not advance			
Conor Ferguson; Darragh Greene; Max McCusker; Shane Ryan	4 × 100 metre medley relay	3:34.97	8 Q	—N/a		3:35.28	7

Women

Athlete	Event	Heat		Semifinal		Final	
Athlete	Event	Time	Rank	Time	Rank	Time	Rank
Erin Riordan	50 metre freestyle	26.26	43	Did not advance			
Victoria Catterson	100 metre freestyle	55.44	19	Did not advance			
Victoria Catterson	200 metre freestyle	1:59.75	19	Did not advance			
Maria Godden	50 metre backstroke	29.13	26	Did not advance			
Maria Godden	100 metre backstroke	1:01.99	20	Did not advance			
Maria Godden	200 metre backstroke	2:13.30	17	Did not advance			
Mona McSharry	50 metre breaststroke	30.72	7 Q	30.57	=6 Q	30.96	8
Mona McSharry	100 metre breaststroke	1:06.49	3 Q	1:06.11	2 Q	1:06.42	5
Mona McSharry	200 metre breaststroke	2:24.82	2 Q	2:25.13	7 Q	2:24.89	5
Erin Riordan; Grace Davison; Maria Godden; Victoria Catterson	4 × 100 metre freestyle relay	3:43.95	10	—N/a		Did not advance	
