= Ireland at the 2023 World Aquatics Championships =

- Flag of Ireland
- World Aquatics code: IRL
- National federation: Swim Ireland
- Website: swimireland.ie

in Fukuoka, Japan
- Competitors: 15 in 2 sports
- Medals: Gold 0 Silver 0 Bronze 0 Total 0

World Aquatics Championships appearances
- 1973; 1975; 1978; 1982; 1986; 1991; 1994; 1998; 2001; 2003; 2005; 2007; 2009; 2011; 2013; 2015; 2017; 2019; 2022; 2023; 2024; 2025

Ireland competed at the 2023 World Aquatics Championships in Fukuoka, Japan from 14 to 30 July.

== Diving ==
Ireland entered three divers.

Men

Athlete	Event	Preliminaries		Semifinals		Final	
Athlete	Event	Points	Rank	Points	Rank	Points	Rank
Jake Passmore	1 m springboard	344.60	17	—N/a		Did not advance	
Jake Passmore	3 m springboard	319.65	45	Did not advance			

Women

Athlete	Event	Preliminaries		Semifinals		Final	
Athlete	Event	Points	Rank	Points	Rank	Points	Rank
Clare Cryan	1 m springboard	229.50	17	—N/a		Did not advance	
Clare Cryan	3 m springboard	289.55	9 Q	283.45	17	Did not advance	
Ciara McGing	10 m platform	244.90	28	Did not advance			

Mixed

Athlete	Event	Final	
Athlete	Event	Points	Rank
Clare Cryan; Jake Passmore	3 m synchronized springboard	237.18	15

== Swimming ==
Ireland entered 12 swimmers.

Men

Athlete	Event	Heat		Semifinal		Final	
Athlete	Event	Time	Rank	Time	Rank	Time	Rank
Tom Fannon	50 metre freestyle	22.13	20	Did not advance			
Conor Ferguson	50 metre backstroke	24.95	11	25.09	13	Did not advance	
Conor Ferguson	100 metre backstroke	54.36	22	Did not advance			
Darragh Greene	50 metre breaststroke	27.54	22	Did not advance			
Darragh Greene	100 metre breaststroke	1:00.54	19	Did not advance			
Darragh Greene	200 metre breaststroke	2:12.21	18	Did not advance			
Max McCusker	100 metre butterfly	53.46	40	Did not advance			
Shane Ryan	100 metre freestyle	49.04	33	Did not advance			
John Shortt	200 metre backstroke	1:59.79	22	Did not advance			
Daniel Wiffen	800 metre freestyle	7:43.81 NR	4 Q	—N/a		7:39.19 ER	4
Daniel Wiffen	1500 metre freestyle	14:43.50	2 Q	—N/a		14:43.01	4
Conor Ferguson; Darragh Greene; Max McCusker; Shane Ryan	4 × 100 m medley relay	3:35.03	13	—N/a		Did not advance	

Women

Athlete	Event	Heat		Semifinal		Final	
Athlete	Event	Time	Rank	Time	Rank	Time	Rank
Victoria Catterson	100 metre freestyle	55.56	26	Did not advance			
Victoria Catterson	200 metre freestyle	2:00.82	31	Did not advance			
Danielle Hill	50 metre freestyle	25.55	30	Did not advance			
Danielle Hill	50 metre backstroke	28.03	13 Q	28.10	10	Did not advance	
Danielle Hill	100 metre backstroke	1:01.51	27	Did not advance			
Danielle Hill	50 metre butterfly	26.90	30	Did not advance			
Mona McSharry	50 metre breaststroke	30.45	12 Q	30.54	11	Did not advance	
Mona McSharry	100 metre breaststroke	1:05.55 NR	2 Q	1:05.96	4 Q	1:06.07	5
Mona McSharry	200 metre breaststroke	2:26.59	16 Q	2:26.27	15	Did not advance	
Ellen Walshe	100 metre butterfly	59.39	24	Did not advance			
Ellen Walshe	200 metre individual medley	2:12.83	16 Q	2:10.92	9	Did not advance	
Ellen Walshe	400 metre individual medley	4:43.24	16	—N/a		Did not advance	
Mona McSharry; Danielle Hill; Erin Riordan; Victoria Catterson	4 × 100 m freestyle relay	3:41.75 NR	15	—N/a		Did not advance	
Danielle Hill; Mona McSharry; Ellen Walshe; Victoria Catterson	4 × 100 m medley relay	4:01.25 NR	13	—N/a		Did not advance	
