= Ireland at the 2007 World Aquatics Championships =

- Flag of Ireland
- World Aquatics code: IRL
- National federation: Swim Ireland
- Website: www.swimireland.ie

in Melbourne, Australia
- Competitors: 2 in 1 sport
- Medals: Gold 0 Silver 0 Bronze 0 Total 0

World Aquatics Championships appearances
- 1973; 1975; 1978; 1982; 1986; 1991; 1994; 1998; 2001; 2003; 2005; 2007; 2009; 2011; 2013; 2015; 2017; 2019; 2022; 2023; 2024; 2025

Ireland competed at the 2007 World Aquatics Championships in Melbourne, Australia from 17 March to 1 April.

== Swimming ==
Ireland entered 2 swimmers.

Women

Athlete	Event	Heat		Semifinal		Final	
Athlete	Event	Time	Rank	Time	Rank	Time	Rank
Melanie Nocher	100 m freestyle	57.72	44	Did not advance			
Melanie Nocher	200 m freestyle	2:02.04	=26	Did not advance			
Melanie Nocher	50 m backstroke	31.52	49	Did not advance			
Melanie Nocher	100 m backstroke	1:04.44 IR	40	Did not advance			
Melanie Nocher	200 m backstroke	2:17.29	32	Did not advance			
Melanie Nocher	200 m individual medley	2:18.92	23	Did not advance			
Melanie Nocher	400 m individual medley	4:59.82	24	Did not advance			
Ciara Farrell	50 m breaststroke	32.69	=19	Did not advance			
Ciara Farrell	100 m breaststroke	1:11.49	29	Did not advance			
Ciara Farrell	200 m breaststroke	2:37.18	32	Did not advance			
