= Ireland at the 2017 World Aquatics Championships =

- Flag of Ireland
- FINA code: IRL
- National federation: Swim Ireland
- Website: www.swimireland.ie

in Budapest, Hungary
- Competitors: 6 in 2 sports
- Medals: Gold 0 Silver 0 Bronze 0 Total 0

World Aquatics Championships appearances
- 1973; 1975; 1978; 1982; 1986; 1991; 1994; 1998; 2001; 2003; 2005; 2007; 2009; 2011; 2013; 2015; 2017; 2019; 2022; 2023; 2024

Ireland is scheduled to compete at the 2017 World Aquatics Championships in Budapest, Hungary from 14 July to 30 July.

== Diving ==
Ireland has entered 1 diver (one male).

Athlete	Event	Preliminaries		Semifinals		Final	
Athlete	Event	Points	Rank	Points	Rank	Points	Rank
Oliver Dingley	Men's 3 m springboard	369.75	33	did not advance			

== Swimming ==
Irish swimmers have achieved qualifying standards in the following events (up to a maximum of 2 swimmers in each event at the A-standard entry time, and 1 at the B-standard):

Men

Athlete	Event	Heat		Semifinal		Final	
Athlete	Event	Time	Rank	Time	Rank	Time	Rank
Conor Ferguson	200 m backstroke	1:59.03	21	did not advance			
Brendan Hyland	100 m butterfly	53.80	44	did not advance			
Brendan Hyland	200 m butterfly	1:59.91	28	did not advance			
Nicholas Quinn	100 m breaststroke	1:01.56	31	did not advance			
Nicholas Quinn	200 m breaststroke	2:12.15	20	did not advance			
Shane Ryan	50 m freestyle	22.79	40	did not advance			
Shane Ryan	50 m backstroke	25.48	23	did not advance			
Shane Ryan	100 m backstroke	54.33	13 Q	53.94	12	did not advance	
Jordan Sloan	100 m freestyle	49.66	36	did not advance			
Jordan Sloan	200 m freestyle	1:49.17	37	did not advance			
Brendan Hyland; Nicholas Quinn; Shane Ryan; Jordan Sloan	4×100 m medley relay	3:36.61	16	—		did not advance	

Women

Athlete	Event	Heat		Semifinal		Final	
Athlete	Event	Time	Rank	Time	Rank	Time	Rank
Mona McSharry	100 m breaststroke	1:08.52	24	did not advance			
