= Gary O'Toole =

Irish swimmer

Personal information
- Full name: Gary Charles O'Toole
- Nationality: Irish
- Born: 6 August 1968 (age 57) Ireland
- Height: 1.80 m (5 ft 11 in)
- Weight: 73 kg (161 lb)

Sport
- Sport: Swimming
- Strokes: Breaststroke, Medley
Medal record
Men's swimming
Representing Ireland
European Championships - Long Course
| Silver medal – second place | 1989 Bonn | 200 m breaststroke |
Summer Universiade
| Gold medal – first place | 1991 Sheffield | 200 m breaststroke |

Gary O'Toole is a retired Irish Olympic swimmer. He represented Ireland at the Seoul and Barcelona Games.

While studying at University College Dublin, O'Toole won a 200 m breaststroke silver medal at the 1989 European Long Course Championships in Bonn. He also won a gold medal at the World University Championships in 1991 when representing University College Dublin and UCD. He helped to break 5 National relay records, including Short Course and Long Course.

As a prominent member of the Irish Amateur Swimming Association, O'Toole had been approached to make representations on behalf of the victims of the George Gibney scandal. Gibney, who coached O'Toole until he became aware of these allegations, criticised O'Toole publicly during the 1992 Olympics. His complaints were ignored and led to a major investigation into the incidents and ultimately to the disbandment of the IASA and the creation of Swim Ireland.

Since his retirement from professional swimming, O'Toole has been a practising Orthopedic surgeon with a specialist interest in adult arthritis (both hip and knee) and knee sports injuries. He also has a keen interest in musculoskeletal cancer (bone and soft tissue tumours). He continued to provide expert analysis for RTÉ Sport's Olympic swimming coverage.
