= Swimming at the 2019 Pan American Games – Women's 200 metre individual medley =

Women's 200 metre individual medley at the 2019 Pan American Games
- Venue: Villa Deportiva Nacional, VIDENA
- Dates: August 10 (preliminaries and finals)
- Competitors: 22 from 16 nations
- Winning time: 2:11.24

Medalists
Gold medal	Alexandra Walsh	United States
Silver medal	Meghan Small	United States
Bronze medal	Bailey Andison	Canada

The women's 200 metre individual medley competition of the swimming events at the 2019 Pan American Games are scheduled to be held August 10th, 2019 at the Villa Deportiva Nacional Videna cluster.

== Records ==
Prior to this competition, the existing world and Pan American Games records were as follows:

World record	Katinka Hosszú (HUN)	2:06.12	Kazan, Russia	August 3, 2015
Pan American Games record	Caitlin Leverenz (USA)	2:10.51	Toronto, Canada	July 18, 2015

== Results ==
KEY:	q	Fastest non-qualifiers	Q	Qualified	GR	Games record	NR	National record	PB	Personal best	SB	Seasonal best

=== Heats ===
The first round was held on August 10.

Rank	Heat	Lane	Name	Nationality	Time	Notes
1	2	4	Meghan Small	United States	2:13.05	QA
2	3	5	Alexandra Walsh	United States	2:14.55	QA
3	3	4	Bailey Andison	Canada	2:15.15	QA
4	1	4	Erika Seltenreich-Hodgson	Canada	2:15.78	QA
5	2	5	Monika González Hermosillo	Mexico	2:17.38	QA
6	2	3	McKenna DeBever	Peru	2:18.22	QA
7	3	3	Virginia Bardach	Argentina	2:18.54	QA
8	2	6	Camila Mello	Brazil	2:18.85	QA
9	1	2	Laura Morley	Bahamas	2:19.37	QB
10	1	3	Florencia Perotti	Argentina	2:19.49	QB
11	3	6	Byanca Rodríguez Villanueva	Mexico	2:20.77	WD
12	1	5	Gabrielle Roncatto	Brazil	2:21.39	QB
13	3	2	Laura Melo	Colombia	2:24.11	QB
14	2	2	Julimar Avila	Honduras	2:25.12	QB
15	2	1	Daniela Alfaro	Costa Rica	2:26.39	QB
16	3	7	Nicole Frank Rodriguez	Uruguay	2:26.46	QB
17	1	7	Fernanda Reyes Hinrichsen	Chile	2:27.63	QB
18	2	7	Gabriela Donahue	Trinidad and Tobago	2:27.66	
19	3	8	Elisa Funes Jovel	El Salvador	2:27.80	
20	1	6	Andrea Santander Banchs	Venezuela	2:28.11	
21	1	1	Sofia Lopez Chaparro	Paraguay	2:29.63	
22	3	1	Mariagracia Torres Nole	Peru	2:31.62	

=== Final B ===
The B final was also held on August 10.

Rank	Lane	Name	Nationality	Time	Notes
9	4	Laura Morley	Bahamas	2:18.54	
10	5	Florencia Perotti	Argentina	2:20.68	
11	6	Laura Melo	Colombia	2:21.81	
12	2	Julimar Avila	Honduras	2:22.43	NR
13	3	Gabrielle Roncatto	Brazil	2:22.61	
14	1	Nicole Frank Rodriguez	Uruguay	2:26.43	
15	7	Daniela Alfaro	Costa Rica	2:27.18	
16	8	Fernanda Reyes Hinrichsen	Chile	2:29.60	

=== Final A ===
The A final was also held on August 10.

Rank	Lane	Name	Nationality	Time	Notes
1st place, gold medalist(s)	5	Alexandra Walsh	United States	2:11.24	
2nd place, silver medalist(s)	4	Meghan Small	United States	2:11.36	
3rd place, bronze medalist(s)	3	Bailey Andison	Canada	2:14.14	
4	2	Monika González Hermosillo	Mexico	2:15.13	
5	7	McKenna DeBever	Peru	2:15.48	NR
6	6	Erika Seltenreich-Hodgson	Canada	2:15.52	
7	8	Camila Mello	Brazil	2:17.22	
8	1	Virginia Bardach	Argentina	2:18.54	
