= Ireland at the 2013 World Aquatics Championships =

- Flag of Ireland
- World Aquatics code: IRL
- National federation: Swim Ireland
- Website: www.swimireland.ie

in Barcelona, Spain
- Competitors: 4 in 2 sports
- Medals: Gold 0 Silver 0 Bronze 0 Total 0

World Aquatics Championships appearances
- 1973; 1975; 1978; 1982; 1986; 1991; 1994; 1998; 2001; 2003; 2005; 2007; 2009; 2011; 2013; 2015; 2017; 2019; 2022; 2023; 2024; 2025

Ireland is competing at the 2013 World Aquatics Championships in Barcelona, Spain between 19 July and 4 August 2013.

== Open water swimming ==
Ireland qualified a single quota in open water swimming.

Athlete	Event	Time	Rank
Christopher Bryan	Men's 10 km	1:49:33.4	16

== Swimming ==
Irish swimmers achieved qualifying standards in the following events (up to a maximum of 2 swimmers in each event at the A-standard entry time, and 1 at the B-standard):

Men

Athlete	Event	Heat		Semifinal		Final	
Athlete	Event	Time	Rank	Time	Rank	Time	Rank
Barry Murphy	50 m freestyle	23.13	43	Did not advance			
Barry Murphy	50 m breaststroke	27.52	=13 Q	27.78	14	Did not advance	
Barry Murphy	50 m butterfly	23.65	=18	Did not advance			

Women

Athlete	Event	Heat		Semifinal		Final	
Athlete	Event	Time	Rank	Time	Rank	Time	Rank
Fiona Doyle	50 m breaststroke	30.93	9 Q	31.52	14	Did not advance	
Fiona Doyle	100 m breaststroke	1:07.88	12 Q	1:07.81	11	Did not advance	
Fiona Doyle	200 m breaststroke	2:30.49	20	Did not advance			
Sycerika McMahon	100 m freestyle	56.19	34	Did not advance			
Sycerika McMahon	200 m freestyle	DNS		Did not advance			
Sycerika McMahon	200 m individual medley	2:14.38	18	Did not advance			
