= Grace Davison (swimmer) =

Northern Ireland swimmer (born 2007)

Personal information
- Nationality: Irish
- Born: 26 August 2007 (age 19)
- Home town: Bangor, County Down, Northern Ireland

Sport
- Country: Northern Ireland
- Sport: Swimming
- Strokes: Freestyle
- Club: Ards
- Coach: Curtis Coulter
Medal record
Women's swimming
Representing Ireland
European Junior Swimming Championships
Bronze medal – third place	2024 Vilnius	100m Freestyle
Bronze medal – third place	2025 Šamorín	100m Freestyle
Bronze medal – third place	2025 Šamorín	200m Individual Medley
Representing Northern Ireland
Commonwealth Youth Games
Gold medal – first place	2023 Trinidad	400 m Individual Medley
Silver medal – second place	2023 Trinidad	200 m Individual Medley

Grace Davison (born 26 August 2007) is a swimmer from Bangor, County Down, Northern Ireland. She represented Ireland at the 2024 Olympics.

Davison represented Northern Ireland at the 2022 Commonwealth Games and 2026 Commonwealth Games.

== Career ==
At 14, Davison competed in the 2022 Commonwealth Games for team Northern Ireland. She competed in four individual events and one relay, and was part of the team that finished 6th in the Women's 4x100m freestyle relay.

Davison won two medals at the 2023 Commonwealth Youth Games in Trinidad and Tobago winning gold in the 400m individual medley and silver in the 200m individual medley.

At 16, Grace Davison was the youngest member of Team Ireland at the 2024 Olympics. She competed in the Women's 4x100m freestyle relay alongside teammates Victoria Catterson, Danielle Hill, and Erin Riordan and the team finished 16th overall. Davison then competed in the Women's 4×100m medley relay with Hill, Mona McSharry and Ellen Walshe, finishing 11th.

In 2025, she claimed bronze in both the 100m freestyle and 200m individual medley events at the 2025 European Junior Swimming Championships.

As of 2026, Davison is the Irish Senior record holder in the 100m freestyle. She was also part of the team that holds the Irish 4×100m medley relay record.

== Major competition results ==
Olympic Games
Year	Women's 4×100m medley relay	Women's 4×100m freestyle relay
2024	16th with Catterson, Riordan, Hill	11th with Hill, McSharry, Walshe

European Championships
Year	100m free	200m free	100m back	Women's 4×100m medley relay	Mixed 4x100m medley relay
2026	22nd	23rd	15th	6th with Cullen, McSharry, Walshe, McCartney	11th with Greene, Cassin, Cullen

Commonwealth Games
Year	50m free	100m free	200m free	50m back	100m back	200m back	200m IM	Relays
2022	25th	—	19th	20th	—	—	12th	6th with Catterson, McAlorum, Hill
2026	—	9th	DNS	—	10th	7th	—	7th with Cullen, McCartney, Burns-Atkin
