= 2021 FINA World Swimming Championships (25 m) – Women's 400 metre individual medley =

Swimming competition

Women's 400 metre individual medley at the 2021 FINA World Swimming Championships (25 m)
- Venue: Etihad Arena
- Location: Abu Dhabi, United Arab Emirates
- Dates: 16 December (heats and final)
- Competitors: 32 from 27 nations
- Winning time: 4:25.55

Medalists
gold medal	Tessa Cieplucha	Canada
silver medal	Ellen Walshe	Ireland
bronze medal	Melanie Margalis	United States

The Women's 400 metre individual medley competition of the 2021 FINA World Swimming Championships (25 m) was held on 16 December 2021.

== Records ==
Prior to the competition, the existing world and championship records were as follows.

World record	Mireia Belmonte (ESP)	4:18.94	Eindhoven, Netherlands	12 August 2017
Competition record	Mireia Belmonte (ESP)	4:19.86	Doha, Qatar	3 December 2014

== Results ==
=== Heats ===
The heats were started at 11:10.

Rank	Heat	Lane	Name	Nationality	Time	Notes
1	4	3	Ilaria Cusinato	Italy	4:30.27	Q
2	4	5	Tessa Cieplucha	Canada	4:30.62	Q
3	4	4	Melanie Margalis	United States	4:30.75	Q
4	3	9	Ellen Walshe	Ireland	4:30.78	Q
5	3	4	Bailey Andison	Canada	4:31.08	Q
6	3	5	Zsuzsanna Jakabos	Hungary	4:32.02	Q
7	3	3	Katie Shanahan	Great Britain	4:32.75	Q
8	3	6	Emma Weyant	United States	4:32.97	Q
9	3	0	Yu Yiting	China	4:33.29	
10	2	4	Anja Crevar	Serbia	4:33.30	
11	3	2	Viktoriya Zeynep Güneş	Turkey	4:34.42	
12	4	1	Viktória Mihályvári-Farkas	Hungary	4:35.69	
13	4	7	Catalina Corró	Spain	4:35.74	
14	4	8	Nathalia Almeida	Brazil	4:36.22	
15	4	2	Maria Ugolkova	Switzerland	4:37.75	
16	4	6	Anastasiia Sorokina	Russian Swimming Federation	4:38.49	
17	3	8	Jung Hae-un	South Korea	4:39.53	
18	4	0	Nikoleta Trníková	Slovakia	4:39.77	
19	2	3	Jimena Pérez	Spain	4:39.88	
20	3	7	Kristýna Horská	Czech Republic	4:39.90	
21	3	1	Deniz Ertan	Turkey	4:40.39	
22	1	4	Kristen Romano	Puerto Rico	4:41.84	NR
23	2	5	Jinjutha Pholjamjumrus	Thailand	4:42.18	
24	4	9	Claudia Hufnagl	Austria	4:42.64	
25	2	6	Chloe Cheng	Hong Kong	4:44.53	
26	2	1	Florencia Perotti	Argentina	4:46.31	
27	2	9	Iman Avdić	Bosnia and Herzegovina	4:47.42	
28	2	2	Alexandra Dobrin	Romania	4:47.99	
29	2	0	Maria Romanjuk	Estonia	4:50.91	
30	1	5	Laura Melo	Colombia	5:00.25	
31	1	6	Karla Abarca	Nicaragua	5:08.94	
32	1	3	Samantha van Vuure	Curaçao	5:13.46	
	2	7	María Fe Muñoz	Peru	DNS	
	2	8	Ashley Lim	Singapore	DNS	

=== Final ===
The final was held at 18:49.

Rank	Lane	Name	Nationality	Time	Notes
1st place, gold medalist(s)	5	Tessa Cieplucha	Canada	4:25.55	
2nd place, silver medalist(s)	6	Ellen Walshe	Ireland	4:26.52	NR
3rd place, bronze medalist(s)	3	Melanie Margalis	United States	4:26.63	
4	8	Emma Weyant	United States	4:27.45	
5	2	Bailey Andison	Canada	4:28.97	
6	4	Ilaria Cusinato	Italy	4:29.37	
7	7	Zsuzsanna Jakabos	Hungary	4:31.49	
8	1	Katie Shanahan	Great Britain	4:32.68	
