= Ireland at the 2022 World Aquatics Championships =

- Flag of Ireland
- FINA code: IRL
- National federation: Swim Ireland
- Website: swimireland.ie

in Budapest, Hungary
- Competitors: 4 in 2 sports
- Medals: Gold 0 Silver 0 Bronze 0 Total 0

World Aquatics Championships appearances
- 1973; 1975; 1978; 1982; 1986; 1991; 1994; 1998; 2001; 2003; 2005; 2007; 2009; 2011; 2013; 2015; 2017; 2019; 2022; 2023; 2024

Ireland competed at the 2022 World Aquatics Championships in Budapest, Hungary from 17 June to 3 July.

Ireland named a team of four athletes, consisting of two swimmers and two divers.

== Diving ==
Ireland entered 2 divers.

Women

Athlete	Event	Preliminaries		Semifinals		Final	
Athlete	Event	Points	Rank	Points	Rank	Points	Rank
Clare Cryan	1 m springboard	203.60	33	—		Did not advance	
Clare Cryan	3 m springboard	238.75	23	Did not advance			
Ciara McGing	10 m platform	230.60	27	Did not advance			

== Swimming ==
Ireland entered 2 swimmers.

Men

Athlete	Event	Heat		Semifinal		Final	
Athlete	Event	Time	Rank	Time	Rank	Time	Rank
Calum Bain	50 m freestyle	22.53	31	Did not advance			
Daniel Wiffen	800 m freestyle	7:46.32 NR	5 Q	—		7:50.63	8
Daniel Wiffen	1500 m freestyle	14:57.66 NR	9	—		Did not advance	
