= Ireland at the 2015 World Aquatics Championships =

- Flag of Ireland
- World Aquatics code: IRL
- National federation: Swim Ireland
- Website: www.swimireland.ie

in Kazan, Russia
- Competitors: 4 in 2 sports
- Medals: Gold 0 Silver 0 Bronze 0 Total 0

World Aquatics Championships appearances
- 1973; 1975; 1978; 1982; 1986; 1991; 1994; 1998; 2001; 2003; 2005; 2007; 2009; 2011; 2013; 2015; 2017; 2019; 2022; 2023; 2024; 2025

Ireland competed at the 2015 World Aquatics Championships in Kazan, Russia from 24 July to 9 August 2015.

== Open water swimming ==
Ireland has qualified one swimmer to compete in the open water marathon.

Athlete	Event	Time	Rank
Christopher Bryan	Men's 10 km	1:53:22.9	44
Christopher Bryan	Men's 25 km	did not finish	

== Swimming ==
Irish swimmers have achieved qualifying standards in the following events (up to a maximum of 2 swimmers in each event at the A-standard entry time, and 1 at the B-standard):

Men

Athlete	Event	Heat		Semifinal		Final	
Athlete	Event	Time	Rank	Time	Rank	Time	Rank
Alex Murphy	50 m breaststroke	28.00	25	did not advance			
Alex Murphy	100 m breaststroke	1:02.22	38	did not advance			

Women

Athlete	Event	Heat		Semifinal		Final	
Athlete	Event	Time	Rank	Time	Rank	Time	Rank
Fiona Doyle	50 m breaststroke	31.31	17	did not advance			
Fiona Doyle	100 m breaststroke	1:07.81	20	did not advance			
Fiona Doyle	200 m breaststroke	2:29.77	29	did not advance			
Sycerika McMahon	200 m freestyle	2:03.89	47	did not advance			
Sycerika McMahon	50 m breaststroke	31.65	=26	did not advance			
Sycerika McMahon	200 m individual medley	2:17.88	33	did not advance			
