= Swimming at the 2019 Pan American Games – Women's 400 metre individual medley =

Women's 400 metre individual medley at the 2019 Pan American Games
- Venue: Villa Deportiva Nacional, VIDENA
- Dates: August 9 (preliminaries and finals)
- Competitors: 15 from 10 nations
- Winning time: 4:39.90

Medalists
Gold medal	Tessa Cieplucha	Canada
Silver medal	Virginia Bardach	Argentina
Bronze medal	Mary-Sophie Harvey	Canada

The women's 400 metre individual medley competition of the swimming events at the 2019 Pan American Games was held on August 9, 2019, at the Villa Deportiva Nacional Videna cluster.

== Records ==
Prior to this competition, the existing world and Pan American Games records were as follows:

World record	Katinka Hosszú (HUN)	4:26.36	Rio de Janeiro, Brazil	August 6, 2016
Pan American Games record	Caitlin Leverenz (USA)	4:35.46	Toronto, Canada	July 16, 2015

== Results ==
KEY:	q	Fastest non-qualifiers	Q	Qualified	GR	Games record	NR	National record	PB	Personal best	SB	Seasonal best

=== Heats ===
The first round was held on August 9.

Rank	Heat	Lane	Name	Nationality	Time	Notes
1	1	5	Mary-Sophie Harvey	Canada	4:42.70	QA
2	2	4	Tessa Cieplucha	Canada	4:45.61	QA
3	1	4	Mariah Denigan	United States	4:48.99	QA
4	2	3	Virginia Bardach	Argentina	4:50.09	QA
5	1	6	Fernanda de Goeij	Brazil	4:50.84	QA
6	2	6	Florencia Perotti	Argentina	4:52.39	QA
7	1	3	Monika González Hermosillo	Mexico	4:53.42	QA
8	2	5	Alexandra Skezely	United States	4:57.14	QA
9	2	7	Marie Conde Merlos	Mexico	4:59.08	QB
10	2	2	Maria Eduarda Sumida	Brazil	5:00.95	QB
11	2	8	Ana Pastrana Lizano	Honduras	5:16.93	QB
12	2	1	Daniela Alfaro	Costa Rica	5:17.13	QB
13	1	8	Krista Jurado Schmoock	Guatemala	5:17.28	QB
14	1	1	Mayerly Escalante Hernandez	Venezuela	5:20.57	QB
	1	2	Maria Muñoz Machuca	Peru	DSQ	
	1	7	Andrea Hurtado Pereda	Peru	DNS	

=== Final B ===
The B final was also held on August 9.

Rank	Lane	Name	Nationality	Time	Notes
9	4	Marie Conde Merlos	Mexico	4:57.84	
10	5	Maria Eduarda Sumida	Brazil	4:58.01	
11	6	Daniela Alfaro	Costa Rica	5:05.98	
12	2	Krista Jurado Schmoock	Guatemala	5:12.72	
13	7	Mayerly Escalante Hernandez	Venezuela	5:19.79	
	3	Ana Pastrana Lizano	Honduras	DSQ	

=== Final A ===
The A final was also held on August 9.

Rank	Lane	Name	Nationality	Time	Notes
1st place, gold medalist(s)	5	Tessa Cieplucha	Canada	4:39.90	
2nd place, silver medalist(s)	6	Virginia Bardach	Argentina	4:41.05	
3rd place, bronze medalist(s)	4	Mary-Sophie Harvey	Canada	4:43.20	
4	8	Alexandra Skezely	United States	4:45.29	
5	3	Mariah Denigan	United States	4:48.47	
6	7	Florencia Perotti	Argentina	4:49.25	
7	2	Fernanda de Goeij	Brazil	4:50.83	
8	1	Monika González Hermosillo	Mexico	4:53.75	
