= Swimming at the 2015 Pan American Games – Women's 200 metre individual medley =

Women's 200 metre individual medley at the 2015 Pan American Games
- Venue: CIBC Pan Am/Parapan Am Aquatics Centre and Field House
- Dates: July 18 (preliminaries and finals)
- Competitors: 15 from 11 nations
- Winning time: 2:10.51

Medalists
| Gold medal | Caitlin Leverenz | United States |
| Silver medal | Meghan Small | United States |
| Bronze medal | Sydney Pickrem | Canada |

The women's 200 metre individual medley competition of the swimming events at the 2015 Pan American Games took place on July 18 at the CIBC Pan Am/Parapan Am Aquatics Centre and Field House in Toronto, Canada. The defending Pan American Games champion was Julia Smit of the United States.

This race consisted of four lengths of the pool, each swum in a different stroke. All participating swimmers would take part in 3 heats based on qualifying time. The 8 fastest swimmers would advance to the final.

== Records ==
Prior to this competition, the existing world and Pan American Games records were as follows:

| World record | Ariana Kukors (USA) | 2:06.15 | Rome, Italy | July 27, 2009 |
| Pan American Games record | Julia Smit (USA) | 2:13.07 | Rio de Janeiro, Brazil | July 20, 2007 |

The following new records were set during this competition.

| Date | Event | Name | Nationality | Time | Record |
|---|---|---|---|---|---|
| 18 July | Heat 3 | Caitlin Leverenz | United States | 2:11.04 | GR |
| 18 July | A Final | Caitlin Leverenz | United States | 2:10.51 | GR |

== Qualification ==
Each National Olympic Committee (NOC) was able to enter up to two entrants providing they had met the A standard (2:20.49) in the qualifying period (January 1, 2014 to May 1, 2015). NOCs were also permitted to enter one athlete providing they had met the B standard (2:28.92) in the same qualifying period. All other competing athletes were entered as universality spots.

== Schedule ==
All times are Eastern Time Zone (UTC-4).

| Date | Time | Round |
|---|---|---|
| July 18, 2015 | 10:16 | Heats |
| July 18, 2015 | 19:18 | Final B |
| July 18, 2015 | 19:25 | Final A |

== Results ==
| KEY: | q | Fastest non-qualifiers | Q | Qualified | GR | Games record | NR | National record | PB | Personal best | SB | Seasonal best |

=== Heats ===
The first round was held on July 18.

| Rank | Heat | Lane | Name | Nationality | Time | Notes |
|---|---|---|---|---|---|---|
| 1 | 3 | 4 | Caitlin Leverenz | United States | 2:11.04 | QA, GR |
| 2 | 3 | 5 | Sydney Pickrem | Canada | 2:11.16 | QA, NR |
| 3 | 1 | 4 | Meghan Small | United States | 2:13.90 | QA |
| 4 | 2 | 4 | Erika Seltenreich-Hodgson | Canada | 2:14.02 | QA |
| 5 | 2 | 3 | Alia Atkinson | Jamaica | 2:15.16 | QA |
| 6 | 2 | 5 | Joanna Maranhão | Brazil | 2:15.32 | QA |
| 7 | 1 | 5 | Virginia Bardach | Argentina | 2:16.86 | QA |
| 8 | 3 | 3 | Gabrielle Roncatto | Brazil | 2:17.67 | QA |
| 9 | 3 | 6 | Florencia Perotti | Argentina | 2:18.95 | QB |
| 10 | 1 | 3 | Arantxa Medina | Mexico | 2:19.26 | QB |
| 11 | 2 | 6 | McKenna DeBever | Peru | 2:21.65 | QB |
| 12 | 2 | 2 | Mercedes Toledo | Venezuela | 2:25.24 | QB |
| 13 | 3 | 7 | Karen Vilorio | Honduras | 2:25.87 | QB |
| 14 | 1 | 2 | Lara Butler | Cayman Islands | 2:26.50 | QB |
| 15 | 2 | 7 | Lisa Blackburn | Bermuda | 2:29.04 | QB |
| | 1 | 6 | Esther Gonzalez | Mexico | DNS | |
| | 3 | 2 | Barbara Caraballo | Puerto Rico | DNS | |

=== B Final ===
The B final was also held on July 18.

| Rank | Lane | Name | Nationality | Time | Notes |
|---|---|---|---|---|---|
| 9 | 4 | Florencia Perotti | Argentina | 2:17.65 | |
| 10 | 3 | McKenna DeBever | Peru | 2:18.49 | |
| 11 | 5 | Arantxa Medina | Mexico | 2:18.82 | |
| 12 | 6 | Mercedes Toledo | Venezuela | 2:22.06 | |
| 13 | 7 | Lara Butler | Cayman Islands | 2:24.64 | NR |
| 14 | 2 | Karen Vilorio | Honduras | 2:24.72 | |
| | 1 | Lisa Blackburn | Bermuda | DNS | |

=== A Final ===
The A final was also held on July 16.

| Rank | Lane | Name | Nationality | Time | Notes |
|---|---|---|---|---|---|
| 1st place, gold medalist(s) | 4 | Caitlin Leverenz | United States | 2:10.51 | GR |
| 2nd place, silver medalist(s) | 3 | Meghan Small | United States | 2:11.26 | |
| 3rd place, bronze medalist(s) | 5 | Sydney Pickrem | Canada | 2:11.29 | |
| 4 | 7 | Joanna Maranhão | Brazil | 2:12.39 | |
| 5 | 6 | Erika Seltenreich-Hodgson | Canada | 2:14.06 | |
| 6 | 1 | Virginia Bardach | Argentina | 2:15.45 | |
| 7 | 8 | Gabrielle Roncatto | Brazil | 2:17.02 | |
| 8 | 2 | Alia Atkinson | Jamaica | 2:18.02 | |
