= Swimming at the 2019 Pan American Games – Women's 200 metre butterfly =

Women's 200 metre butterfly at the 2019 Pan American Games
- Venue: Villa Deportiva Nacional, VIDENA
- Dates: August 6 (preliminaries and finals)
- Competitors: 15 from 10 nations

Medalists
Gold medal	Virginia Bardach	Argentina
Silver medal	Mary-Sophie Harvey	Canada
Bronze medal	Meghan Small	United States

The women's 200 metre butterfly competition of the swimming events at the 2019 Pan American Games are scheduled to be held August 6, 2019 at the Villa Deportiva Nacional Videna cluster.

== Records ==
Prior to this competition, the existing world and Pan American Games records were as follows:

World record	Zige Liu (CHN)	2:01.81	Jinan, China	October 21, 2009
Pan American Games record	Kathleen Hersey (USA)	2:07.64	Rio de Janeiro, Brazil	July 21, 2007

== Results ==
KEY:	q	Fastest non-qualifiers	Q	Qualified	GR	Games record	NR	National record	PB	Personal best	SB	Seasonal best

=== Heats ===
The first round was held on August 6.

Rank	Heat	Lane	Name	Nationality	Time	Notes
1	1	4	Virginia Bardach	Argentina	2:11.37	QA
2	2	4	Sarah Gibson	United States	2:11.78	QA
3	1	3	Diana Luna Sánchez	Mexico	2:12.67	QA
3	2	6	Mary-Sophie Harvey	Canada	2:12.67	QA
5	1	6	María Mata Cocco	Mexico	2:12.88	QA
6	1	5	Danielle Hanus	Canada	2:13.26	QA
7	2	3	Meghan Small	United States	2:14.04	QA
8	2	5	Isabella Páez	Venezuela	2:14.10	QA
9	2	2	Giovanna Diamante	Brazil	2:15.55	QB
10	2	1	Silvana Cabrera	Peru	2:15.89	QB
11	1	7	María Fe Muñoz	Peru	2:16.76	QB
12	2	7	Daniela Alfaro	Costa Rica	2:18.84	QB
13	1	1	Inés Marín	Chile	2:19.60	QB
14	2	8	Jennifer Ramirez Posada	Honduras	2:24.83	QB
15	1	8	Natalia Kuipers	Virgin Islands	2:32.49	QB
	1	2	Maria Luiza Pessanha	Brazil	DNS	

=== Final B ===
The B final was also held on August 6.

Rank	Lane	Name	Nationality	Time	Notes
9	5	Silvana Cabrera	Peru	2:15.20	
10	3	María Fe Muñoz	Peru	2:15.91	
11	4	Giovanna Diamante	Brazil	2:16.22	
12	6	Daniela Alfaro	Costa Rica	2:17.99	
13	2	Inés Marín	Chile	2:19.69	
14	7	Jennifer Ramirez Posada	Honduras	2:24.50	
15	1	Natalia Kuipers	Virgin Islands	2:32.07	

=== Final A ===
The A final was also held on August 6.

Rank	Lane	Name	Nationality	Time	Notes
1st place, gold medalist(s)	4	Virginia Bardach	Argentina	2:10.87	
2nd place, silver medalist(s)	6	Mary-Sophie Harvey	Canada	2:11.68	
3rd place, bronze medalist(s)	1	Meghan Small	United States	2:12.51	
4	3	Diana Luna Sánchez	Mexico	2:13.02	
5	5	Sarah Gibson	United States	2:13.08	
6	2	María Mata Cocco	Mexico	2:13.12	
7	7	Danielle Hanus	Canada	2:13.95	
8	8	Isabella Páez	Venezuela	2:15.53	
