= Swimming at the 2020 European Aquatics Championships – Mixed 4 × 100 metre freestyle relay =

Mixed 4 × 100 metre freestyle relay at the 2020 European Aquatics Championships
- Venue: Danube Arena
- Dates: 22 May 2021
- Competitors: 76 from 16 nations
- Teams: 16
- Winning time: 3:22.07

Medalists
gold medal	Duncan Scott; Thomas Dean; Anna Hopkin; Freya Anderson; Matthew Richards; Jacob Whittle; Evelyn Davis; Lucy Hope	Great Britain
silver medal	Stan Pijnenburg; Jesse Puts; Ranomi Kromowidjojo; Femke Heemskerk; Luc Kroon; Marrit Steenbergen; Kim Busch	Netherlands
bronze medal	Alessandro Miressi; Thomas Ceccon; Federica Pellegrini; Silvia Di Pietro; Manuel Frigo; Chiara Tarantino	Italy

The Mixed 4 × 100 metre freestyle relay competition of the 2020 European Aquatics Championships was held on 22 May 2021.

== Records ==
Before the competition, the existing European and championship records were as follows.

	Team	Time	Location	Date
World record	United States	3:19.40	Gwangju	29 July 2019
European record	Netherlands	3:21.81	Budapest	29 July 2017
Championship record	France	3:22.07	Glasgow	8 August 2018

The following new records were set during this competition.

Date	Event	Nation	Time	Record
22 May	Final	Great Britain	3:22.07	=CR

== Results ==
=== Heats ===
The heats were started at 11:02.

Rank	Heat	Lane	Nation	Swimmers	Time	Notes
1	2	2	Italy	Manuel Frigo (48.90); Thomas Ceccon (47.84); Chiara Tarantino (54.73); Silvia Di Pietro (54.90)	3:26.37	Q
2	1	2	Poland	Jakub Kraska (48.77); Kacper Majchrzak (49.11); Kornelia Fiedkiewicz (54.86); Alicja Tchórz (54.21)	3:26.95	Q, NR
3	2	7	Netherlands	Stan Pijnenburg (48.75); Luc Kroon (49.35); Marrit Steenbergen (54.04); Kim Busch (55.20)	3:27.34	Q
4	2	6	Great Britain	Matthew Richards (48.97); Jacob Whittle (48.47); Evelyn Davis (55.42); Lucy Hope (54.51)	3:27.37	Q, NR
5	1	8	Hungary	Nándor Németh (48.75); Richárd Bohus (49.32); Petra Senánszky (55.29); Fanni Gyurinovics (54.64)	3:28.00	Q
6	2	5	Serbia	Velimir Stjepanović (49.22); Andrej Barna (48.33); Tanja Popović (55.60); Nina Stanisavljević (55.04)	3:28.19	Q, NR
7	1	4	Denmark	Mathias Rysgaard (49.08); Frederik Ried Lentz (48.60); Julie Kepp Jensen (54.64); Emily Gantriis (56.03)	3:28.35	Q, NR
8	1	5	Sweden	Björn Seeliger (49.77); Robin Hanson (49.28); Louise Hansson (54.26); Sara Junevik (55.17)	3:28.48	Q
9	1	7	Russia	Aleksandr Shchegolev (48.76); Ivan Girev (49.11); Arina Surkova (55.29); Anna Egorova (55.57)	3:28.73	
10	1	3	Ireland	Max McCusker (50.66); Jordan Sloan (50.13); Erin Riordan (56.27); Victoria Catterson (56.00)	3:33.06	NR
11	2	0	Turkey	Baturalp Ünlü (51.22); Yalım Acımış (50.31); Selen Özbilen (55.98); İlknur Nihan Çakıcı (55.99)	3:33.50	
12	2	3	Slovakia	Matej Duša (50.11); Ádám Halás (51.06); Martina Cibulková (56.61); Teresa Ivanová (55.89)	3:33.67	NR
13	2	8	Iceland	Dadó Fenrir Jasminuson (52.09); Kristinn Þórarinsson (52.25); Snæfríður Jórunnardóttir (56.24); Jóhanna Guðmundsdóttir (58.09)	3:38.67	NR
14	1	6	Andorra	Tomás Lomero (52.58); Bernat Lomero (52.30); Nàdia Tudó (1:00.10); Mónica Ramírez (58.59)	3:43.57	NR
15	2	4	Armenia	Artur Barseghyan (50.49); Vladimir Mamikonyan (53.70); Ani Poghosyan (1:01.02); Varsenik Manucharyan (59.96)	3:45.17	
16	1	1	Kosovo	Arti Krasniqi (55.01); Vigan Bytyqi (57.18); Eda Zeqiri (1:04.98); Era Budima (1:06.06)	4:03.23	
	2	1	Switzerland	Did not start		

=== Final ===
The final was held at 19:31.

Rank	Lane	Nation	Swimmers	Time	Notes
1st place, gold medalist(s)	6	Great Britain	Duncan Scott (48.20); Thomas Dean (48.11); Anna Hopkin (52.88); Freya Anderson (52.88)	3:22.07	=CR, NR
2nd place, silver medalist(s)	3	Netherlands	Stan Pijnenburg (48.55); Jesse Puts (48.39); Ranomi Kromowidjojo (53.59); Femke Heemskerk (51.73)	3:22.26	
3rd place, bronze medalist(s)	4	Italy	Alessandro Miressi (47.63); Thomas Ceccon (47.59); Federica Pellegrini (53.58); Silvia Di Pietro (53.84)	3:22.64	NR
4	5	Poland	Jakub Kraska (49.19); Kacper Majchrzak (48.41); Alicja Tchórz (54.42); Katarzyna Wasick (53.57)	3:25.59	NR
5	2	Hungary	Nándor Németh (48.27); Richárd Bohus (48.62); Petra Senánszky (55.20); Fanni Gyurinovics (54.18)	3:26.27	
6	8	Sweden	Robin Hanson (49.53); Isak Eliasson (48.23); Louise Hansson (54.24); Sara Junevik (55.30)	3:27.30	
7	7	Serbia	Andrej Barna (48.42); Velimir Stjepanović (49.11); Tanja Popović (55.98); Nina Stanisavljević (54.84)	3:28.35	
	1	Denmark	Mathias Rysgaard (49.63); Frederik Ried Lentz; Signe Bro; Julie Kepp Jensen	DSQ	
