= Cieplucha =

Cieplucha is a Polish surname. Notable people with the surname include:

- Maciej Cieplucha (born 1988), Polish figure skater
- Tessa Cieplucha (born 1998), Canadian swimmer
