= Swimming at the 2014 South American Games – Women's 200 metre individual medley =

Women's 200 metre individual medley at the 2014 South American Games
- Venue: Estadio Nacional
- Dates: March 7, 2014 (heats & finals)
- Competitors: 12 from 7 nations
- Winning time: 2:19.44

Medalists
gold medal	Virginia Bardach	Argentina
silver medal	Florencia Perotti	Argentina
bronze medal	Júlia Gerotto	Brazil

The women's 200 metre individual medley competition at the 2014 South American Games took place on March 7 at the Estadio Nacional. The last champion was Joanna Maranhão of Brazil.

This race consisted of four lengths of the pool, one each in backstroke, breaststroke, butterfly and freestyle swimming.

== Records ==
Prior to this competition, the existing world and Pan Pacific records were as follows:

World record	Ariana Kukors (USA)	2:06.15	Rome, Italy	July 27, 2009
South American Games record	Joanna Maranhão (BRA)	2:17.07	Medellín, Colombia	March 26, 2010

== Results ==
All times are in minutes and seconds.

KEY:	q	Fastest non-qualifiers	Q	Qualified	CR	Championships record	NR	National record	PB	Personal best	SB	Seasonal best

=== Heats ===
The first round was held on March 7, at 11:40.

Rank	Heat	Lane	Name	Nationality	Time	Notes
1	2	4	Virginia Bardach	Argentina	2:21.93	Q
2	1	4	Samantha Arévalo	Ecuador	2:24.69	Q
3	1	6	Júlia Gerotto	Brazil	2:24.92	Q
4	1	5	Florencia Perotti	Argentina	2:24.95	Q
5	2	5	Nathalia Almeida	Brazil	2:25.25	Q
6	2	3	Mercedes Toledo	Venezuela	2:26.61	Q
7	1	3	María Muñoz	Colombia	2:26.67	Q
8	1	7	Sofia López Chaparro	Paraguay	2:28.05	Q
9	2	2	Avalon Schultz Donlan	Chile	2:28.97	
10	1	2	Maria Arrua Villagra	Paraguay	2:29.44	
11	2	7	Courtney Schultz Donlan	Chile	2:29.50	
12	2	6	Erika Torrellas	Venezuela	2:29.58	

=== Final ===
The final was held on March 7, at 19:43.

Rank	Lane	Name	Nationality	Time	Notes
1st place, gold medalist(s)	4	Virginia Bardach	Argentina	2:19.44	
2nd place, silver medalist(s)	6	Florencia Perotti	Argentina	2:20.67	
3rd place, bronze medalist(s)	3	Júlia Gerotto	Brazil	2:21.22	
4	5	Samantha Arévalo	Ecuador	2:22.72	
5	2	Nathalia Almeida	Brazil	2:22.87	
6	7	Mercedes Toledo	Venezuela	2:23.95	
7	1	María Muñoz	Colombia	2:24.51	
8	8	Sofia López Chaparro	Paraguay	2:29.30	
