= Swimming at the 2026 European Aquatics Championships – Women's 400 metre individual medley =

Women's 400 metre individual medley at the 2026 European Aquatics Championships
- Venue: Paris Aquatic Centre
- Dates: 12 August 2026
- Competitors: 14 from 13 nations
- Winning time: 4:34.42

Medalists
gold medal	Ellen Walshe	Ireland
silver medal	Amalie Smith	Great Britain
bronze medal	Justina Kozan	Poland

The Women's 400 metre individual medley competition of the 2026 European Aquatics Championships will be held on 12 August 2026.

== Records ==
Prior to the competition, the existing world, European and championship records were as follows:

Record	Mark	Swimmer	Venue	Date
World record	4:23.65	Summer McIntosh (CAN)	(Canada) Victoria	11 June 2025
European record	4:26.36	Katinka Hosszú (HUN)	(Brazil) Rio de Janeiro	6 August 2016
Championship record	4:30.90	Katinka Hosszú (HUN)	(United Kingdom) London	16 May 2016

== Results ==
=== Heats ===
The heats were started at 10:49.

Rank	Heat	Lane	Swimmer	Nation	Time	Notes
1	2	2	Justina Kozan	Poland	4:40.47	Q
2	2	4	Amalie Smith	Great Britain	4:40.56	Q
3	2	5	Vivien Jackl	Hungary	4:40.71	Q
4	1	5	Alba Vázquez	Spain	4:41.37	Q
5	2	6	Giada Alzetta	Italy	4:41.39	Q
6	1	4	Ellen Walshe	Ireland	4:41.76	Q
7	1	2	Anastasia Gorbenko	Israel	4:42.23	Q
8	1	3	Anna Pirovano	Italy	4:43.09	Q
9	2	3	Noelle Benkler	Germany	4:46.65	
10	1	7	Ieva Maļuka	Latvia	4:48.50	
11	1	6	Aleksandra Knop	Poland	4:49.90	
12	1	1	Emma Barthel	Luxembourg	4:52.24	
13	2	7	Aviva Hollinsky	Austria	4:52.64	
14	2	1	Tea Windblad	Sweden	4:52.97	

=== Final ===
The final was started at 19:54.

Rank	Lane	Swimmer	Nation	Time	Notes
1st place, gold medalist(s)	7	Ellen Walshe	Ireland	4:34.42	NR
2nd place, silver medalist(s)	5	Amalie Smith	Great Britain	4:35.12	
3rd place, bronze medalist(s)	4	Justina Kozan	Poland	4:36.47	NR
4	3	Vivien Jackl	Hungary	4:37.30	
5	6	Alba Vázquez	Spain	4:38.21	
6	2	Giada Alzetta	Italy	4:39.83	
7	1	Anastasia Gorbenko	Israel	4:45.07	
8	8	Anna Pirovano	Italy	4:48.25	
