= Meghan Small =

American swimmer (born 1998)

Personal information
- Full name: Meghan Nicole Small
- National team: USA
- Born: May 25, 1998 (age 28) Fort Campbell, Kentucky, U.S.
- Home town: Lineboro, Maryland, U.S.
- Height: 5 ft 6 in (168 cm)
- Weight: 131 lb (59 kg)

Sport
- Sport: Swimming
- Event: 200 meter Individual Medley
- Strokes: Individual Medley
- Club: York, PA. YMCA
- College team: University of Tennessee
- Coach: Michael Brooks (York YMCA); Matt Kredich (U. Tennessee)
Medal record
Women's swimming
Representing the United States
Pan American Games
Silver medal – second place	2015 Toronto	200 m individual medley
Silver medal – second place	2019 Lima	200 m individual medley
Bronze medal – third place	2019 Lima	200 m butterfly
Youth Olympic Games
Bronze medal – third place	2014 Nanjing	200 m individual medley
Representing the Tennessee Volunteers
NCAA Championships
Gold medal – first place	2019 Austin	4×50 y medley

Meghan Nicole Small (born May 25, 1998) is an American competitive swimmer who competed for the University of Tennessee, and won a silver and bronze in the 200 metre IM at the Pan American Games in 2019 in Lima, Peru, and a second silver medal at the Pan American games in 2015 in Toronto in the 200 metre Individual Medley.

== Early life ==
Small was born the oldest of four siblings on May 25, 1998 to Michelle Hill and Zachory Small in Fort Campbell, though she grew up in Lineboro, Maryland. Meghan attended Manchester Valley High School in nearby Manchester, Maryland. With a relatively late start, she began competitive swimming at the age of eleven, and was active with the York, Pennsylvania YMCA team, with York just across the border from Lineboro. At the York YMCA, she was coached by Michael Brooks who warned her of the adjustment competitive swim training would require. In time, the York YMCA won a YMCA national title in swimming. At the YMCA Nationals in her Freshman year, she placed third in the 200 Individual Medley. With steady progress through her High School Senior year, Swimswam magazine rated her as a first level National collegiate recruit.

In a high point of her young career in 2014, she won the bronze medal in the girls' 200 metre individual medley at the Summer Youth Olympics held in Nanjing, China.

== 2015, 2019 Pan American Games ==
She won the silver medal in the women's 200 metre individual medley event and the bronze medal in the women's 200 metre butterfly event at the 2019 Pan American Games held in Lima, Peru. She won a second silver medal at the Pan American games in 2015 in Toronto in the 200 m individual medley.

=== 2016 Olympic trials ===
In June 2016, before her Freshman year, she earned a seventh place in the 2016 U.S. Olympic trials in Omaha, Nebraska, completing the finals of the 200 meter individual medley with a time of 2:13.31. A standout on the York YMCA team, for the 2016 Olympic trials she qualified to compete in 6 events.

=== University of Tennessee ===
She attended and swam for the University of Tennessee from 2016-2020, under Head Coach Matt Kredich who headed both men's and women's swimming at Tennessee from 2012-2025, and started at Tennesse in 2005. At Tennessee, she was a recipient of 18 All America honors. In her Senior year in 2020, the women's team won the Southeastern Conference Championships. In that year, Small received All-SEC Conference first team honors. An able student, in 2019, she made the SEC Honor Roll. In 2018, as a Junior, she was voted All-sec conference second team, and in 2019 made the SEC Academic Honor Roll. As a Freshman in 2017, she received voted All-Sec First team honors. In a high point, as a Tennesse upperclassman, she was part of a 2019 4×50 yard medley relay team that won a gold medal at the NCAA Championships in Austin.

=== Honors ===
While at Tennessee, she received the Darla & Gino Inman Athletic Scholarship.
