= Murder of Esther and Jessica McCann =

1992 murder in Ireland

On 4 September 1992, Frank McCann killed his wife, Esther McCann (née Leonard), and his eighteen-month-old foster-daughter Jessica McCann (who was also his biological niece) by setting fire to the family home in Rathfarnham, Dublin, Ireland. The couple had been trying to adopt Jessica, but the process had been repeatedly delayed, due to reports to the adoption agency that McCann, an Olympic swimming coach, had fathered a child with a seventeen-year-old student of his who had special needs. Fearing for the damage to his reputation if it came out, McCann resolved to murder his wife and foster-child. Found guilty of both of their murders in 1996, McCann was sentenced to life imprisonment. He remains in custody as of August 2025 but has been granted occasional unsupervised leave.

== Background ==
Frank, originally a cooper by trade, was at the time of the fire running a successful pub in Blessington called "The Cooperage".

=== Abuse of swimming students ===
Frank McCann was a swimming coach involved with the Irish Olympian swimming team and had a reputation "for turning young swimmers into champions". Two of McCann's colleagues – George Gibney and Derry O'Rourke – were at the time of the arson accused of engaging in pedophilic behaviour with their swimming students, which took ten years to arise. It later emerged that while complaints had been made to the organisation, they were being dealt with by McCann, who either ignored or explained away the complaints. Derry O'Rourke was charged with 90 counts of indecent assault, sexual assault and unlawful carnal knowledge in 1995, and in 1997 was found guilty of 29 offences relating to the sexual abuse of 11 girls, all minors, and was sentenced to twelve years in prison. Facing 27 similar charges, Gibney left Ireland in 1993, and was not extradited for trial until 2025. The charges leveled at George Gibney were ultimately quashed by the Supreme Court, who ruled that too much time had elapsed since the alleged offenses took place to ensure a fair trial. It later emerged that McCann had kept secret that he had fathered a son with one of his own swimming students, a girl with special needs who was seventeen years old at the time of the birth of the child. This child was born in May 1987, and Esther and Frank were married in August 1987. At the time of the fire, Frank was allegedly sexually abusing another girl, who was sixteen years of age.

=== Adoption of Jessica ===
Jessica McCann was born to Frank's sister Jeanette in March 1991, when Jeanette was 18 years old. Shortly after Jessica's birth, Jeanette asked Frank and Esther to adopt the girl. On 20 May 1991, the couple applied to adopt the child. Faced with repeated unexplained delays to the adoptive process, by September 1992 Esther still had not received a decision from the Adoptions Board, and she was repeatedly ringing the organisation for updates regarding her application. Unbeknown to Esther, Frank had discovered that the mother of the girl he had raped and had a child with had heard of the adoption application and lodged a complaint with the Adoptions Board on 16 April 1991 (before the McCann's had applied for adoption), ultimately leading to the McCann's application being rejected on 29 July 1992. Esther was granted an appointment with the Adoptions Board on 7 September 1992, and Frank resolved to kill Esther and Jessica in order to preserve his reputation.

=== Initial murder attempts ===
Prior to the night of the arson, Frank had attempted to murder Esther and Jessica on at least three different occasions. These attempts included setting fire to Esther's electric blanket while she slept, repeatedly causing deliberate damage to gas pipes in the house leading to numerous gas leaks and cutting the brakes of Esther's car. All of the attempts were carried out when Jessica was in Esther's care.

== Murder ==
Around 10pm on the night of the murder, Frank and Esther arrived home. Roughly an hour later, Frank returned to The Cooperage. Sometime after 1am, when Esther and Jessica were asleep, a fire broke out in their home. The fire was seen breaking out by a group of people returning from a wedding, who notified authorities. At around 1:30 am, Frank arrived at the home once again. Witnesses present at the fire when Frank arrived described him as distraught, and he had to be restrained by his neighbours from purportedly trying to enter the property, supposedly in an effort to save his wife and foster-daughter.

Initially, Frank was not considered a suspect in the attack. Having given a statement over the course of five hours the day after the fire, he was further invited to Blessington Garda station three days after the fire, and was reportedly perceived as a grieving husband, seeming to break down on several occasions when discussing the case. When it came to light that Frank had fathered a child with one of his swimming students, Gardaí reexamined the events of the night of the fire.

Experts reviewing the blaze determined that the stairwell had been the seat of the fire, and that an accelerant had been used. Upon investigation, it was concluded that the gas pipes in the utility room of the house had also been deliberately damaged. The damage was determined to be such that could only have been caused by the application of intense heat, such as that produced by a blowtorch, a tool which Frank would have been familiar with due to his training as a cooper.

In November 1992, Frank McCann was arrested and made confessions of murder to Gardaí, which he later recanted. After his confessions, he was charged with arson and double murder.

== Trials ==
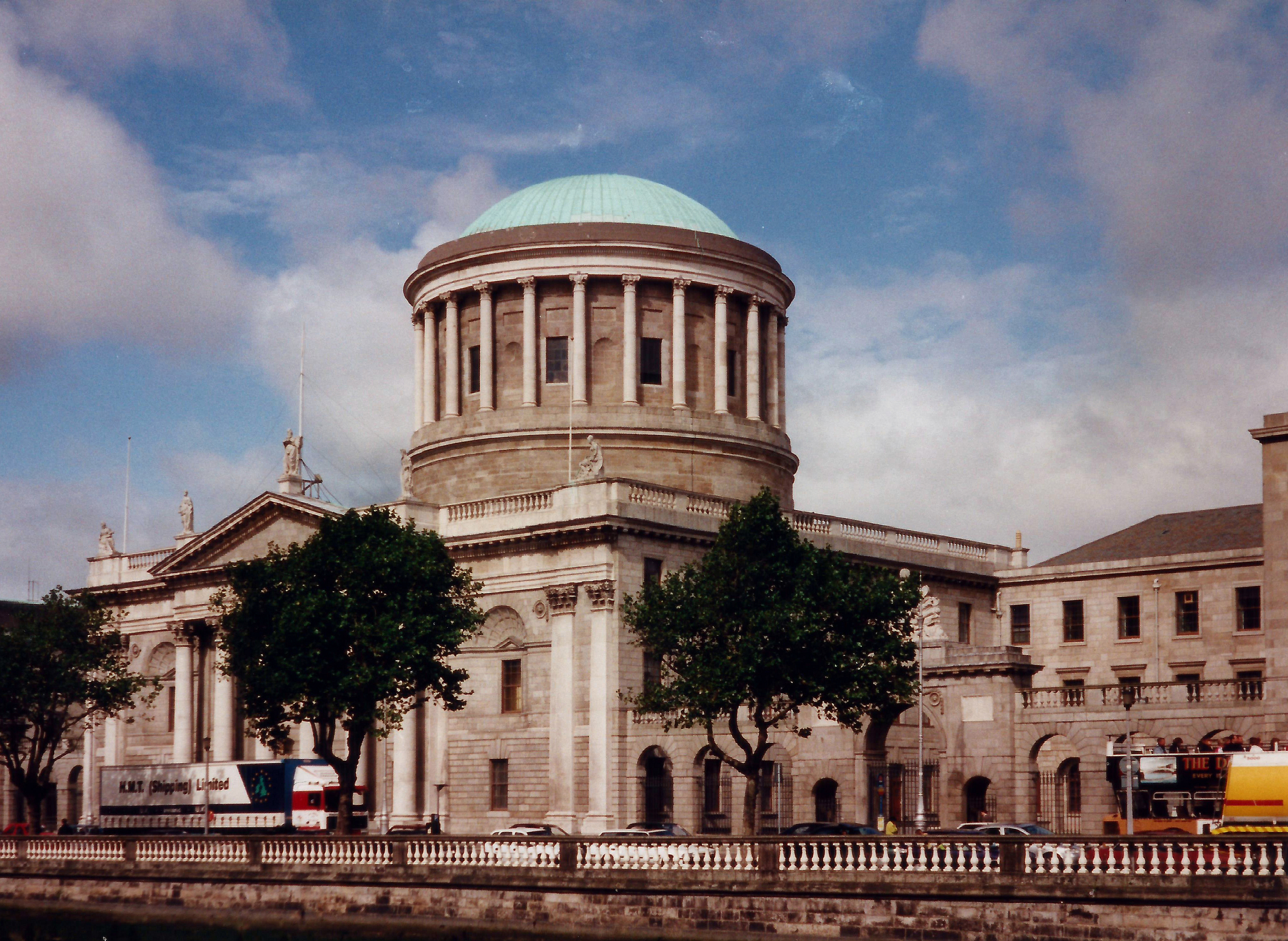
The Four Courts in Dublin, where McCann's two criminal trials took place.

=== Criminal trials ===
McCann's first trial began on 11 January 1994 but collapsed on 31 January after he tried to immolate himself using deodorant as an accelerant in the bathroom of Arbour Hill Prison.

McCann's second trial began on 10 June 1996. It was, at the time of its conclusion on 15 August 1996, the second longest trial in the history of the Irish Courts Service up until that point, and remains one of the longest trials in Irish history. McCann was described as being calm and in control for almost the entirety of the court case, but for one occasion where he seemingly had a panic attack on 1 August, while on the stand. Marian Leonard, Esther's sister, claims that McCann was able to trigger hyperventilation at will, and had taught her how to do so too, and therefore she believed that McCann was faking the panic attack. McCann was sentenced to life imprisonment and is currently serving his sentence in Arbour Hill Prison in Dublin.

=== Civil trial ===
In 1998, McCann was sued for damages for loss and suffering by Esther's mother, Bridget O'Brien, in a civil trial that was described as the first of its kind in Ireland. O'Brien won the case, and was awarded half the value of the proceeds of the sale of Frank and Esther's house, as judge Elizabeth Dunne ruled that McCann's murdering of his wife nullified typical survivorship laws. In a ruling comparable to the Son of Sam law in the United States, Dunne ordered the sale of the house, with the net proceeds divided 52.5% to O'Brien, and 47.5% to McCann. She further ordered McCann to pay O'Brien his IR£27,900 share of a life insurance policy taken against the mortgage, as well as her legal costs, estimated to cost a further £20,000.

== Aftermath ==
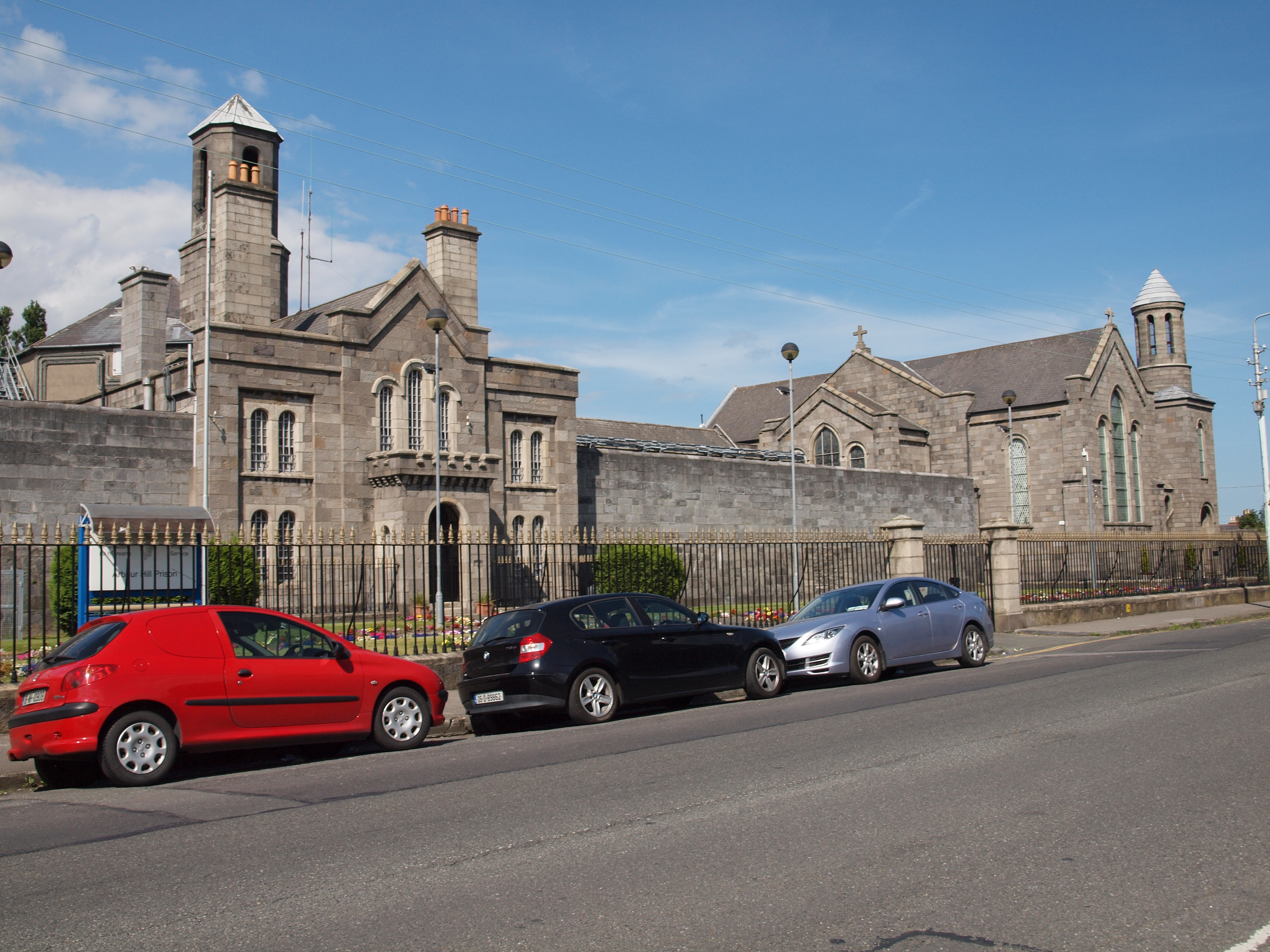
Arbour Hill Prison in Dublin, where Frank McCann is currently incarcerated.

While in prison, McCann achieved both a degree in computer science, and a PhD. McCann has appealed his sentence on numerous occasions, first in 1996 upon first being convicted, and then again in 1998.

In 2017, McCann started working within the prison, cleaning the officers' quarters.

He was refused parole, for the sixth time, in late 2024 and cannot apply again until spring 2026; he was granted unsupervised leave during summer 2025.

=== Representation in the media ===
On 5 February 2007, an episode of Scannal (English: Scandal, a long running Irish television show detailing past notable scandals in the state) titled The Swimming Nightmare/An Tromluí Snámha aired on RTÉ One. It detailed the abuse of young girls under the tutelage of Gibney, O'Rourke, and McCann.

On 30 May 2019, Marian Leonard, Esther's sister, appeared on the RTÉ Radio 1 show Drivetime to talk about the case and the possibility of McCann being granted parole, after McCann was granted unaccompanied leave from Arbour Hill in order attend an educational course. In December 2021, the case was featured in Series 2 Episode 3 of The Case I Can't Forget on RTÉ One.
