= Swimming at the 2014 South American Games – Women's 200 metre butterfly =

Women's 200 metre butterfly at the 2014 South American Games
- Venue: Estadio Nacional
- Dates: March 9, 2014 (heats & finals)
- Competitors: 11 from 9 nations
- Winning time: 2:12.42

Medalists
gold medal	Andreina Pinto	Venezuela
silver medal	Isabella Paez	Venezuela
bronze medal	Virginia Bardach	Argentina

The women's 200 metre butterfly swimming competition at the 2014 South American Games took place on March 9 at the Estadio Nacional. The last champion was Joanna Maranhão of Brazil.

This race consisted of four lengths of the pool, all lengths being in butterfly stroke.

== Records ==
Prior to this competition, the existing world and Pan Pacific records were as follows:

World record	Liu Zige (CHN)	2:01.81	Jinan, China	October 21, 2009
South American Games record	Joanna Maranhão (BRA)	2:13.22	Medellín, Colombia	March 28, 2010

== Results ==
All times are in minutes and seconds.

KEY:	q	Fastest non-qualifiers	Q	Qualified	CR	Championships record	NR	National record	PB	Personal best	SB	Seasonal best

=== Heats ===
The first round was held on March 9, at 11:51.

Rank	Heat	Lane	Name	Nationality	Time	Notes
1	1	4	Isabella Paez	Venezuela	2:16.64	Q
2	2	4	Andreina Pinto	Venezuela	2:19.83	Q
3	1	3	Maria Far	Panama	2:21.16	Q
4	1	5	Virginia Bardach	Argentina	2:21.26	Q
5	2	6	Jessica Camposano	Colombia	2:21.44	Q
6	2	5	Manuella Lyrio	Brazil	2:21.47	Q
7	2	3	Júlia Gerotto	Brazil	2:21.82	Q
8	1	6	Martina Navaro Kusch	Chile	2:23.50	Q
9	2	2	Lizzy Nolasco Vazquez	Peru	2:24.73	
10	1	2	Adriana Parra Chiriboga	Ecuador	2:27.36	
11	2	7	Karen Riveros	Paraguay	2:34.00	

=== Final ===
The final was held on March 9, at 19:41.

Rank	Lane	Name	Nationality	Time	Notes
1st place, gold medalist(s)	5	Andreina Pinto	Venezuela	2:12.42	CR
2nd place, silver medalist(s)	4	Isabella Paez	Venezuela	2:15.31	
3rd place, bronze medalist(s)	6	Virginia Bardach	Argentina	2:16.79	
4	1	Júlia Gerotto	Brazil	2:17.57	
5	2	Jessica Camposano	Colombia	2:19.00	
6	3	Maria Far	Panama	2:20.03	
7	8	Martina Navaro Kusch	Chile	2:21.78	
8	7	Manuella Lyrio	Brazil	2:21.87	
