= Swimming at the 2010 South American Games – Women's 200 metre individual medley =

The Women's 200m individual medley event at the 2010 South American Games was held on March 26, with the heats at 11:08 and the Final at 18:49.

== Medalists ==
Gold	Silver	Bronze
Joanna Maranhão; Brazil	Georgina Bardach; Argentina	Erika Stewart; Colombia

== Records ==
Standing records prior to the 2010 South American Games
World record	Ariana Kukors (USA)	2:06.15	Rome, Italy	27 July 2009
Competition Record	Georgina Bardach (ARG)	2:17.49	Buenos Aires, Argentina	15 November 2006
South American record	Joanna Maranhão (BRA)	2:12.12	Rome, Italy	26 July 2009

== Results ==
=== Heats ===
Rank	Heat	Lane	Athlete	Result	Notes
1	2	4	Georgina Bardach (ARG)	2:23.66	Q
2	1	4	Larissa Freitas Cieslak (BRA)	2:24.95	Q
3	3	4	Joanna Maranhão (BRA)	2:25.34	Q
4	2	5	Erika Stewart (COL)	2:26.14	Q
5	2	3	Samantha Arévalo (ECU)	2:26.73	Q
6	3	5	Virginia Bardach (ARG)	2:28.82	Q
7	2	2	Isabella Arcila (COL)	2:29.86	Q
8	2	6	Chinyere Pigot (SUR)	2:30.39	Q
9	1	5	Eliana Barrios (VEN)	2:30.91	
10	3	6	Maria Alejandra Perez (PER)	2:30.93	
11	1	6	Patricia Mariana San Martin (PER)	2:31.06	
12	3	3	Antonella Scanavino (URU)	2:31.71	
13	2	7	Maria Jose Quintanilla (BOL)	2:32.14	
14	1	3	Camila Isabel Espinosa (ECU)	2:32.55	
15	3	2	Maria Laura Britez (PAR)	2:33.81	
16	1	2	Daniella van den Berg (ARU)	2:34.78	
17	3	7	Silvana Valenzuela (PAR)	2:41.47	

=== Final ===
Rank	Lane	Athlete	Result	Notes
1st place, gold medalist(s)	3	Joanna Maranhão (BRA)	2:17.07	CR
2nd place, silver medalist(s)	4	Georgina Bardach (ARG)	2:19.53	
3rd place, bronze medalist(s)	6	Erika Stewart (COL)	2:22.41	
4	5	Larissa Freitas Cieslak (BRA)	2:24.21	
5	8	Eliana Barrios (VEN)	2:26.41	
6	7	Virginia Bardach (ARG)	2:26.85	
7	2	Samantha Arévalo (ECU)	2:26.85	
8	1	Chinyere Pigot (SUR)	2:30.75	
