= Swimming at the 2010 South American Games – Women's 4 × 200 metre freestyle relay =

The Women's 4x200m freestyle relay event at the 2010 South American Games was held on March 26 at 19:09.

== Medalists ==
Gold	Silver	Bronze
Tatiana Barbosa; Daynara de Paula; Sarah Correa; Joanna Maranhão; Brazil	Nadia Colovini; Georgina Bardach; Virginia Bardach; Cecilia Biagioli; Argentina	Yanel Pinto; Elimar Barrios; Darneyis Orozco; Andreina Pinto; Venezuela

== Records ==
Standing records prior to the 2010 South American Games
World record	China	7:42.08	Rome, Italy	30 July 2009
Competition Record	Argentina	8:27.26	Buenos Aires, Argentina	15 November 2006
South American record	Brazil	8:05.29	Athens, Greece	18 August 2004

== Results ==
=== Final ===
Rank	Lane	Athlete	Result	Notes
1st place, gold medalist(s)	5	Brazil	8:24.85	CR
1st place, gold medalist(s)	5	Tatiana Barbosa	2:07.25	CR
1st place, gold medalist(s)	5	Daynara de Paula	2:08.14	CR
1st place, gold medalist(s)	5	Sarah Correa	2:07.49	CR
1st place, gold medalist(s)	5	Joanna Maranhão	2:01.97	CR
2nd place, silver medalist(s)	4	Argentina	8:26.65	
2nd place, silver medalist(s)	4	Nadia Colovini	2:08.25	
2nd place, silver medalist(s)	4	Georgina Bardach	2:07.84	
2nd place, silver medalist(s)	4	Virginia Bardach	2:07.88	
2nd place, silver medalist(s)	4	Cecilia Biagioli	2:02.68	
3rd place, bronze medalist(s)	3	Venezuela	8:32.24	
3rd place, bronze medalist(s)	3	Yanel Pinto	2:09.34	
3rd place, bronze medalist(s)	3	Elimar Barrios	2:08.98	
3rd place, bronze medalist(s)	3	Darneyis Orozco	2:10.02	
3rd place, bronze medalist(s)	3	Andreina Pinto	2:03.90	
4	6	Colombia	8:39.10	
4	6	Jessica Camposano	2:08.34	
4	6	Carmen Maury	2:10.72	
4	6	Valentina Hurtado	2:07.74	
4	6	Erika Stewart	2:12.30	
5	2	Peru	8:50.52	
5	2	Daniela Coello	2:14.12	
5	2	Andrea del Rosario Rodriguez	2:12.53	
5	2	Maria Graciela Rosales	2:14.98	
5	2	Maria Alejandra Perez	2:08.89	
6	7	Ecuador	9:06.47	
6	7	Diana Ibarra	2:14.42	
6	7	Katia Paola Esquivel	2:18.47	
6	7	Samantha Arévalo	2:16.60	
6	7	Nicole Maria Gilbert	2:16.98	
7	1	Paraguay	9:30.57	
7	1	Maria Nery Huerta	2:19.24	
7	1	Andrea Maria Ramirez	2:24.85	
7	1	Maria Laura Britez	2:21.99	
7	1	Lujan Vargas	2:24.49	
