= Irish Open Short Course Swimming Championships =

The Irish Open Short Course Championships along with the Irish LC Championships, are the highest level competition which takes place in Ireland. Commonly referred to as 'The Nationals' the competition is run by Swim Ireland and takes place each year at the end of July/beginning of August and traditionally close that national swimming season. For the last number of years this competition has taken place in Lagan Valley Leisureplex, Lisburn, Northern Ireland.

In 2006, the Irish Open Short Course Championships incorporated the Irish European Short Course Trials.

== Results ==
Results of the 2006 Irish Open Short Course Championships can be found here
