= Irish Amateur Swimming Association =

Former Irish sport governing body

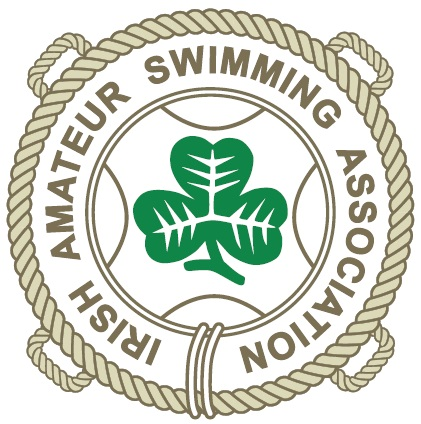
- Founded: 1893
- Location: Dublin, Ireland
- President: Mary O'Malley (until disbandment)
- Replaced: Swim Ireland
- (Republic of Ireland)

The Irish Amateur Swimming Association (IASA) was the national governing body of swimming in Ireland. The organisation was founded in 1893 and held responsibility for the various aquatic disciplines until it was dissolved in January 1999 following a series of sexual abuse scandals.

Following the winding up of the IASA, it was replaced as a national governing body of aquatic sports in Ireland by Swim Ireland.

== Foundation ==
The Irish Amateur Swimming Association was created after a meeting between the Leinster Swimming Association and Ulster Swimming Association in Fisher's Restaurant, Donegall Place, Belfast on Saturday 25 November 1893. Prior to this meeting, the two associations had been founded and developed in tandem since 1890 when the British Amateur Swimming Association had suggested that the number of clubs in Ireland now warranted an independent association.

== Early years (1894–1913) ==
On 4 August 1894, J. McDermid of Templemore A.S.C. became the first Irish Champion under the new Association's rules when he annexed the 100 yards Championship of Ireland at the Belfast Waterworks ornamental pond. While Leinster Swimmers had some success at Irish Championships in these early years, their progress was impeded by a lack of indoor facilities in the region at this time and it was not considered surprising that some of the organisation's first international sides were dominated by Ulster swimmers. Likewise in water polo, early inter-provincial matches were dominated by Ulster. The side chosen for the organisation's very first international was made up of all Ulster men with the exception of R.A. Andrews from Blackrock WPC. This first international was held in Westminster Baths, Great Smith Street, London on Monday 23 September 1895.

In 1904, three clubs from Cork had formed themselves into the Cork Swimming Council and had applied for membership of the IASA as the Munster Branch of the IASA.

Ireland was among the founding members of the Federation Internationale de Natation Amateur (FINA) being represented at the meeting on 19 July 1908 during the London 1908 Olympiad by Dr. WJ Dockrell and HM Dockrell.

During the period 1893 to 1914, Leinster swimmers dominated Irish Championships. Of the 80 Championships swum, Leinster won 66. Of these, 54 were won by just five swimmers, namely HM Dockrell (6), Oscar Conway (9), Jim Beckett (10), and George Dockrell (20).

Diving also began to develop in Ireland over this period. 1900 had seen the first National Diving Competition was held at Highgate Baths, London and was won by EG Coldwell representing Sandycove SC. Influenced by this early success the sport of diving began to take root in Leinster and the Leinster High Diving Championship was introduced.

== Interwar period (1915–1940) ==
There were only three Irish Championships held in 1914. No further championships or AGMs were held until 1919. Swimming continued at a local level in all three affiliated provinces. WV Edwards, 220 yards champion in 1912 like many others was killed in action in 1917 and others like Trevor Chute would return again and swim but as an amputee.

When an AGM was held again on 31 May 1919, the decision was made to introduce 'ladies' events in national championships – the 100 yards and Diving Championship for ladies as well as an Irish Water Polo Championship. This decision was long overdue – as early as 1874 a Miss Rounds of Dundrum won a 440 yards ladies' race at Blackrock, County Dublin, but the account of this event was treated in a humorous and superficial manner by "Figaro" in the Irish Times. On the other hand, in 1875 the Irish Sportsman editorialised on the desirability of learning to swim in order to prevent tragic drownings and scorned the notion that worries over "nakedness" should prevent one from swimming. In the same year it further commented on "Swimming and the Fair Sex" and urged that prevalent prudery in that regard be dropped.

The inaugural Ladies' 100 yards Irish Championship was held on 2 August 1919 at Blackrock Baths. Miss May Armstrong, the outstanding female swimmer of that period, was the winner. She would repeat this feat for the following six years.

By 1920, the move towards having athletes representing Ireland independently at the Olympic Games was underway and although a Munster motion "that Ireland take no part in the Paris Olympic Games unless separate representation" was defeated, a motion "that Ireland seek to secure separate representation at future Olympiads" was carried. In due course, an invitation to Ireland to take part in the 1924 Olympic Games in Paris was received.

Prior to these games, it was alleged the British Olympic Council had stated that Ulster-born athletes could not compete for Ireland. The IASA replied that as far as swimming was concerned Ireland would be represented as an entire entity or not at all. This latter approach prevailed and a team travelled and competed which was representative of the whole of Ireland. Ireland were represented at the 1924 Summer Olympics by a water polo team captained by Noel Purcell. No "speed" swimmers participated however.

By 1930s, diving had grown as a sport also and the early success of Coldwell was followed by that of Eddie Heron, who had dominated the sport since the 1930s. He became a household name and a report from his exhibition in Foynes, County Limerick in 1940 records the crowd at 5,000. Unfortunately, there was a lack of adequate indoor diving facilities over subsequent periods.

International success in the subsequent period in swimming and water polo was limited and much of the period was dominated by political wrangling between the different branches and discussions over which flag swimmers should compete under. The organisation endured however, and in 1934 a Connacht branch joined the IASA achieving the goal of a single governing body for the island as a whole.

== Gradual modernisation (1940–1990) ==
By 1941, the Sunday Independent was reporting crowds of 100,000 spectators at the Liffey Swim and the volume of clubs had increased exponentially over the preceding decade. The state of national championships was not satisfactory as championships were often held in unsuitable and non-standard conditions. Many of the best swimmers did not always attend the championships and as a result the event was often won by the best local swimmer with times which varied largely depending on the speed of the current. As a result, in 1941 the decision was taken to create a Centralised Championship Gala to be held over the August Bank Holiday weekend at Blackrock Baths.

The success of this format which was held in Blackrock from 1941 to 1948 lead to the rotation of the Gala to various baths across the country and began a rotation of the championship between the provinces.

1962 saw the first indoor National Championship Gala which was held at Butlin's Holiday Camp, Mosney, County Meath. 1963 saw the first national championship to be televised from the Grove Pool in Belfast. The 1960s were a period of innovation in Irish swimming with the introduction of national squad training, development of centralised programme for teachers and coaches, and an increase in the number of indoor pools. International results also began to improve with the country's first individual winners in internationals, victories at the ASA Championships, and re-entering the Olympics.

1990 saw the first introduction of computerisation at the national championship held in 1990 at the Guinness Pool. By the turn of the millennium, Ireland still did not have an Olympic-sized pool, placing any swimmer training here at an enormous disadvantage at international competition.

== Michelle Smith – Olympic medals and controversy ==
At the 1996 Olympic Games in Atlanta, Michelle Smith became Ireland's first Olympic medalist in swimming – winning three golds and a bronze. A shadow was cast over these medals when subsequently in 1998 she was banned for 4 years from the sport for tampering with a urine sample using alcohol during a mandatory out of competition test.

== Abuse scandals and abolition ==
In the late 1990s, various abuse scandals came to light. They led eventually in 1999 to the abolition of the IASA and its replacement with a new national governing body, Swim Ireland.

Derry O'Rourke, Olympic coach in 1980 and 1992, was convicted on 27 sexual abuse charges against minors and sentenced to 12 years imprisonment in 1998. He received a further sentence of 10 years in 2005 for repeated rape and indecent assault of a female swimmer between the ages of 14 and 18. He was again convicted on historical charges of rape and indecent assault in 2024.

George Gibney, national and Olympic coach (1984–1991) and teacher at Newpark Comprehensive School in the 1970s, was charged with 27 counts of sexual abuse involving children and youth he coached. A judicial review in 1994 prevented the case from proceeding due to the length of time that had elapsed since the alleged incidents took place. He left Ireland to live in the United States. Following the release of the BBC podcast Where is George Gibney?, it was revealed that the Gardaí were including new victims in their ongoing investigation of historical sexual abuse. A file was sent to the Director of Public Prosecutions in November 2023. Gibney was arrested in the US pending extradition to Ireland, relating to over 70 charges issued in 2023, in June 2025. Gibney was extradited to Ireland on 22 July 2025. On 6 July 2026, the Central Criminal Court convicted him of 39 counts of indecent assault, and 1 count of attempted rape. On 12 October 2026, Gibney was sentenced to a combined 15 and a half years imprisonment.

Frank McCann, Irish team manager from the 1980s through to the 1990s, was convicted of the murders of his wife and child to prevent them discovering he had sexually abused an underage swimmer and had fathered her child.
