= Bailey Andison =

Canadian swimmer (born 1997)

Personal information
- National team: Canada
- Born: November 13, 1997 (age 28) Smiths Falls, Ontario
- Height: 177 cm (5 ft 10 in)
- Weight: 71 kg (157 lb)

Sport
- Sport: Swimming
- Strokes: Medley
Medal record
Women's swimming
Representing Canada
World Championships (SC)
Gold medal – first place	2021 Abu Dhabi	4×100 m freestyle
Pan American Games
Bronze medal – third place	2019 Lima	200 m medley

Bailey Andison (born November 13, 1997) is a Canadian competitive swimmer who specializes in the medley events.

== Career ==
In 2019, Andison won a bronze medal at the 2019 Pan American Games in Lima, Peru in the 200 individual medley race.

As part of the 2021 Canadian Olympic swimming trials in Toronto, Andison finished third in the 200 IM. This qualified her for the 2020 Summer Olympics in Tokyo.
