= Ellen Walshe =

Irish swimmer (born 2001)

Personal information
- Nationality: Irish
- Born: 29 September 2001 (age 25) Templeogue, Ireland

Sport
- Sport: Swimming
- University team: University of Tennessee
Medal record
Women's swimming
Representing Ireland
World Championships (SC)
| Silver medal – second place | 2021 Abu Dhabi | 400 m medley |
European Championships (LC)
| Gold medal – first place | 2026 Paris | 200 m medley |
| Gold medal – first place | 2026 Paris | 400 m medley |
European Championships (SC)
| Gold medal – first place | 2025 Lublin | 200 m butterfly |
| Silver medal – second place | 2025 Lublin | 200 m medley |
| Bronze medal – third place | 2023 Otopeni | 400 m medley |
European U-23 Championships
| Gold medal – first place | 2023 Dublin | 200 m medley |
| Gold medal – first place | 2023 Dublin | 400 m medley |
| Silver medal – second place | 2023 Dublin | 100 m butterfly |
European Youth Olympic Festival
| Silver medal – second place | 2015 Tbilisi | 100 m butterfly |

Ellen Walshe (born 29 September 2001) is an Irish swimmer. She is a two-time European champion, winning the individual medley double (200 m and 400 m IM) at the 2026 European Aquatics Championships.

She competed at the 2020 Summer Olympics in the 100 metre butterfly and the 200 metre individual medley. At the 2021 World Swimming Championships, she won the silver medal in the 400 metre individual medley. She was the first swimmer representing Ireland to win a medal higher than a bronze medal at a World Swimming Championships. Collegiately, she competes for the Tennessee Volunteers.

== Background ==
Walshe started attending the University of Tennessee in 2021, where she competes as part of the Tennessee Volunteers swim team.

== Career ==
=== 2015 European Youth Olympic Festival ===
When Walshe was 13 years old, she won the silver medal in the 100 metre butterfly with a time of 1:02.17 at the 2015 European Youth Summer Olympic Festival held in Tbilisi, Georgia in July and August 2015.

=== 2019 World Aquatics Championships ===
In July 2019, at the 2019 World Aquatics Championships in Gwangju, South Korea, Walshe placed 35th in the prelims heats of the 100 metre butterfly on the first day of competition with a time of 1:00.85. Three days later, she placed 19th in the prelims heats of the 4×100 metre mixed medley relay swimming the butterfly leg of the relay in a 1:00.89 and achieving a time of 3:53.69 with her Ireland relay teammates Conor Ferguson (backstroke), Niamh Coyne (breaststroke), and Robert Powell (freestyle).

=== 2020 European Aquatics Championships ===
On 23 May 2021, at the 2020 European Aquatics Championships held at Danube Arena in Budapest, Hungary, Walshe set a new Irish record in the 4×100 metre medley relay with Danielle Hill, Mona McSharry, and Victoria Catterson at 4:02.93 and placed 11th overall. Three days earlier she split a 1:001.18 on the butterfly leg of the 4×100 metre mixed medley relay to help place 13th and achieve a new Irish record time of 3:49.08 with Shane Ryan, Darragh Greene, and Danielle Hill.

=== 2020 Summer Olympics ===
At the 2020 Summer Olympics in Tokyo, Japan, and delayed to 2021 due to the COVID-19 pandemic, Walshe won her heat, placed 24th overall, and did not advance to the semifinals in the 100 metre butterfly with her time of 59.35 seconds. In her second and final event, Walshe placed 19th overall in the 200 metre individual medley prelims heats with a time of 2:13.34 and finished eighth in prelims heat number four.

=== 2021 World Swimming Championships ===
2021 World Championships
| Silver medal – second place | 400 m medley | 4:26.52 (NR) |

At the 2021 World Swimming Championships conducted in short course metres and held at Etihad Arena in Abu Dhabi, United Arab Emirates, Walshe set a new Irish record in the 400 metre individual medley with a time of 4:30.78 in the prelims heats, which qualified her for the final ranking fourth. In the final of the event, Walshe won the silver medal with a time of 4:26.52, lowering her own Irish record she set in the prelims heats and finishing less than one second after Tessa Cieplucha of Canada. Her silver medal was the second medal won by a swimmer representing Ireland at a World Swimming Championships and the first one won at the championships in an event held at the Olympic Games.

The second day of competition, in the prelims heats of the 200 metre butterfly, Walshe ranked 14th overall with a 2:08.16 and did not qualify for the final. In the prelims heats of the 50 metre butterfly on day three, Walshe placed 22nd with a time of 26.33 seconds, not advancing to the semifinals. On the fifth day, Walshe ranked ninth in the prelims heats of the 200 metre individual medley with a 2:08.69 and achieved alternate status for the final. Her time of 2:08.69 set a new Irish record. Later in the same prelims session, Walshe qualified for the semifinals of the 100 metre butterfly with an Irish record time of 57.32 seconds that tied her in rank for fourteenth with Margaret MacNeil of Canada. In the semifinals of the 100 metre butterfly, Walshe ranked ninth and attained first alternate status for the final with an Irish record time of 56.68 seconds.

Walshe's silver medal was one of two medals won by swimmers representing Ireland at the championships, the other was a bronze medal, which made her medal the highest-medal-finish by a swimmer from the country at a World Swimming Championships.

=== 2021–2022 collegiate season ===
At the Tennessee Invitational in the autumn of Walshe's first collegiate season, also called a freshman year, she swam a personal best time in the 100 yard butterfly with a 50.24, taking first-place and ranking first in the NCAA in the event for the season, just 0.06 seconds ahead of Torri Huske. In her first collegiate double dual meet of the 2022 year, Walshe won the 200 yard individual medley in 1:59.19 and placed fourth in the 100 yard freestyle in 50.92 seconds, helping her team, the Tennessee Volunteers, win against Duke University and Queens University. Later in the month, Walshe won the 100 yard butterfly with a time of 52.91 seconds and won the 200 yard individual medley in 1:57.47, a little slower than her best time of 1:54.77 for the season, in a dual meet against the University of Georgia to help her team win the meet. In the same meet, she also achieved a win as part of the 4×100 yard freestyle relay with a final time of 3:20.01.

==== 2022 Southeastern Conference Championships ====
On the first day of the 2022 Southeastern Conference Championships, held in February 2022, Walshe split a 22.93 for the butterfly leg of the 4×50 yard medley relay to help achieve a second-place finish. In the 4×200 yard freestyle relay, she helped win the race for the Tennessee Volunteers, splitting a 1:44.06 on the second leg of the relay. She ranked first in the prelims heats of the 200 yard individual medley the next morning, swimming a 1:55.02 and advancing to the final. For the final, Walshe swam a 1:52.97, winning the event. In the morning prelims heats on day three, Walshe ranked first in the 400 yard individual medley by over three seconds with a 4:04.26 and ranked second in the 100 yard butterfly in 51.45 seconds, qualifying for the final in both events. She won the final of the 400 yard individual medley by 1.83 seconds, finishing in 4:01.53. Her time of 4:01.53 made her the sixth-fastest female to swim the 400 yard individual medley in the NCAA as a freshman. In the 100 yard butterfly final, she followed up her first win of the session with another, this time finishing first in 50.34 seconds. She split a 49.75 for the butterfly leg of the 4×100 yard medley relay on day four, helping achieve a second-place finish in 3:26.88. On the final day of the Championships, Walshe helped achieve a second-place finish in the 4×100 yard freestyle relay in 3:11.38, splitting a 48.21 for the second leg of the relay. Winning the 200 yard individual medley, 400 yard individual medley, and the 100 yard butterfly, Walshe became the first woman to achieve the feat at the Southeastern Conference Championships level in history. Her accomplishments earned her the "Swimmer of the Meet" and Commissioner's Trophy awards.

==== 2022 NCAA Championships ====
On the first day of the 2022 NCAA Championships, 16 March 2022, Walshe helped place eleventh in the 4×50 yard medley relay, swimming a 23.03 for the butterfly portion of the relay. In the second of two events on the first day, she swam a 1:43.48 for the second leg of the 4×200 yard freestyle relay to contribute to a total time of 6:57.79 and eighth-place finish. Day two, she advanced qualified for the b-final of the 200 yard individual medley ranking 15th with a time of 1:55.63 in the prelims heats. Swimming in the b-final, she placed 16th with a time of 1:56.89. Day three of competition, she started off the morning prelims session ranking third in the 400 yard individual medley with a 4:03.60, then she ranked third in the 100 yard butterfly with a 50.65 and qualified for the final of each event. She achieved these times and finishes with a gap of 23 minutes between races. In the final of each event in the evening, she placed eighth, swimming a 4:09.84 in the 400 yard individual medley and a 51.42 in the 100 yard butterfly. For her third event of the evening, she split a 51.20 for the butterfly leg of the 4×100 yard medley relay to help achieve a tenth-place finish in 3:28.75. In her final event, the 4×100 yard freestyle relay on the fourth and final day, Walshe helped achieve a twelfth-place finish in 3:13.14, swimming the second leg of the relay in 47.76 seconds.

=== 2022 World and European Championships ===
Walshe was pre-selected to Team Ireland for both the 2022 World Aquatics Championships and the 2022 European Aquatics Championships. She chose not to compete in the events she qualified in for the World Championships. Later in 2022, she announced she would stay in Ireland and take online classes to continue her education at the University of Tennessee, however she did not compete for the swim team in the autumn due to chronic fatigue following the 2022 Southeastern Conference Championships.

== Major results ==
Olympic Results
| Year | 100m Fly | 200m IM | 400m IM | 4 × 100 m Medley Relay |
|---|---|---|---|---|
| 2020 | 24th | 19th | — | — |
| 2024 | 22nd | 13th | 8th | 16th with Hill, McSharry, Davison |

World Championship Results
| Year | 50m Fly | 100m Fly | 200m Fly | 100m IM (25m) | 200m IM | 400m IM |
|---|---|---|---|---|---|---|
| 2019 | — | 35th | — | — | — | — |
| 2021 (25m) | 22nd | 9th | — | — | 9th | 2nd place, silver medalist(s) |
| 2023 | — | 24th | — | — | 9th | 16th |
| 2024 (25m) | 14th | 6th | — | 9th | 5th | 5th |
| 2025 | — | — | 8th | — | 8th | 9th |

European Championships
| Year | 50m Fly | 100m Fly | 200m Fly | 100m IM | 200m IM | 400m IM |
|---|---|---|---|---|---|---|
| 2023 (25m) | 12th | 4th | — | 11th | 6th | 3rd place, bronze medalist(s) |
| 2025 (25m) | 22nd | — | 1st place, gold medalist(s) | 7th | 2nd place, silver medalist(s) | 7th |
| 2026 | 26th | — | 4th | — | 1st place, gold medalist(s) | 1st place, gold medalist(s) |

== National Records ==
| Event | Time | Meet | Location | Date |
50m
| 200m Freestyle | 1:58.72 | 2026 Irish Championships | Bangor, Ireland | 10 April 2026 |
| 100m Butterfly | 57.96 | 2023 Irish Championships | Dublin, Ireland | 1 April 2023 |
| 200m Butterfly | 2:07.40 | 2026 European Championships | Paris, France | 16 August 2026 |
| 200m Backstroke | 2:09.69 | 2026 Irish Summer Championships | Bangor, Ireland | 24 July 2026 |
| 200m Individual Medley | 2:09.81 | 2026 European Championships | Paris, France | 15 August 2026 |
| 400m Individual Medley | 4:34.42 | 2026 European Championships | Paris, France | 12 August 2026 |
25m
| 50m Butterfly | 25.45 | 2024 World Championships | Budapest, Hungary | 10 December 2024 |
| 100m Butterfly | 55.50 | 2024 World Championships | Budapest, Hungary | 13 December 2024 |
| 200m Butterfly | 2:02.36 | 2025 World Cup | Toronto, Canada | 23 October 2025 |
| 200m Freestyle | 1:53.72 | 2025 Irish Championships | Dublin, Ireland | 13 December 2025 |
| 100m Individual Medley | 58.19 | 2025 European Championships | Lublin, Poland | 3 December 2025 |
| 200m Individual Medley | 2:04.75 | 2025 World Cup | Toronto, Canada | 25 October 2025 |
| 400m Individual Medley | 4:22.97 | 2025 World Cup | Toronto, Canada | 24 October 2025 |

=== Relays ===
| Event | Time | Teammates | Meet | Location | Date |
|---|---|---|---|---|---|
| Women's 4 × 100 m Medley Relay (50m) | 3:57.26 | Cullen, McSharry, Davison | 2025 European Championships | Paris, France | 16 August 2026 |
| Women's 4 × 100 m Medley Relay (25m) | 3:59.95 | Hill, Coyne, Riordan | 2019 Irish Championships | Dublin, Ireland | 15 December 2019 |
| Mixed 4×50m Medley Relay (25m) | 1:40.54 | Shortt, Corby, Phelan | 2025 European Championships | Lublin, Poland | 3 December 2025 |

Legend: NR – Irish record; h – prelims heat; sf – semifinal

== See also ==
- List of World Swimming Championships (25 m) medalists (women)
