= List of Irish records in swimming =

The Irish records in swimming are ratified by Irelands's governing body in swimming, Swim Ireland. Records can be set in long course (50 metres) or short course (25 metres) swimming pools, with records currently recorded in the following events for both men and women.

- Freestyle: 50 m, 100 m, 200 m, 400 m, 800 m, 1500 m
- Backstroke: 50 m, 100 m, 200 m
- Breaststroke: 50 m, 100 m, 200 m
- Butterfly: 50 m, 100 m, 200 m
- Individual medley: 100 m (short course only), 200 m, 400 m
- Relays: 4×50 m freestyle (short course only), 4 × 100 m freestyle, 4 × 200 m freestyle, 4×50 m freestyle (short course only), 4 × 100 m medley

== Long course (50 m) ==
=== Men ===
Event	Time		Name	Club	Date	Meet	Location	Ref
50 m freestyle	21.58		Tom Fannon	Laser	22 July 2026	Irish Summer Championships	Dublin, Ireland	
100 m freestyle	48.39	sf	Shane Ryan	Ireland	18 June 2024	European Championships	Belgrade, Serbia	
200 m freestyle	1:46.66	rh, =	Jack McMillan	Ireland	27 July 2021	Olympic Games	Tokyo, Japan	
200 m freestyle	1:46.66	h, =	Evan Bailey	Ireland	28 July 2025	World Championships	Singapore, Singapore	
400 m freestyle	3:44.35		Daniel Wiffen	Loughborough University	13 April 2023	Swim Open Stockholm	Stockholm, Sweden	
800 m freestyle	7:38.19		Daniel Wiffen	Ireland	30 July 2024	Olympic Games	Paris, France	
1500 m freestyle	14:34.07		Daniel Wiffen	Ireland	18 February 2024	World Championships	Doha, Qatar	
50m backstroke	24.32	h	Shane Ryan	Ireland	3 August 2018	European Championships	Glasgow, Great Britain	
100m backstroke	53.37		John Shortt	-	22 March 2026	-		
100m backstroke	53.17	not ratified	John Shortt	NC Limerkick Bluefin	9 April 2026	Irish Championships	Bangor, Great Britain	
200m backstroke	1:55.31	sf	John Shortt	Ireland	11 August 2026	European Championships	Paris, France	
50m breaststroke	26.84		Jack Kelly	Terenure	9 April 2026	Irish Championships	Bangor, Great Britain	
100m breaststroke	58.90	sf	Jack Kelly	Ireland	10 August 2026	European Championships	Paris, France	
200m breaststroke	2:09.23	sf	Jack Kelly	Ireland	12 August 2026	European Championships	Paris, France	
50m butterfly	23.10		Shane Ryan	Ireland	16 April 2025	Irish Championships	Dublin, Ireland	
100m butterfly	51.90	h	Max McCusker	Dolphin	23 May 2024	Irish Championships	Dublin, Ireland	
100m butterfly	51.78	unofficial	Max McCusker	Ireland	24 May 2026	Enhanced Games	Las Vegas, United States	
200m butterfly	1:56.55	sf	Brendan Hyland	Ireland	23 July 2019	World Championships	Gwangju, South Korea	
200m individual medley	2:01.00		Jack Cassin	NCL Limerick Dolphin	12 April 2026	Irish Championships	Bangor, United Kingdom	
400m individual medley	4:22.55	h	Liam Custer	Ireland	10 August 2026	European Championships	Paris, France	
4×50m freestyle relay	1:34.41		David Prendergast (23.78); Dean Power (23.73); Alex Melennec (23.75); Kevin McGlade (23.15)	University College Dublin	21 July 2016	Portuguese Open Championships	Oeiras, Portugal	
4×100m freestyle relay	3:16.88	h	Jack McMillan (49.12); Jordan Sloan (49.20); Shane Ryan (49.02); Max McCusker (49.54)	Ireland	17 May 2021	European Championships	Budapest, Hungary	
4×200m freestyle relay	7:12.00		Jack McMillan (1:47.46); Finn McGeever (1:47.81); Jordan Sloan (1:48.65); Gerry Quinn (1:48.08)	Ireland	19 May 2021	European Championships	Budapest, Hungary	
4×50m medley relay	1:41.94		David Prendergast (26.33); Darragh Greene (27.62); Alexander Murphy (24.47); Kevin McGlade (23.52)	University College Dublin	23 July 2016	Portuguese Open Championships	Oeiras, Portugal	
4×100m medley relay	3:33.74	h	John Shortt (53.97); Jack Kelly (59.18); Jack Cassin (52.05); Evan Bailey (48.54)	Ireland	16 August 2026	European Championships	Paris, France	

Legend: # – Record awaiting ratification by Swim Ireland; WR – World record; ER – European record; e – equalled existing record;
Records not set in finals: h – heat; sf – semifinal; r – relay 1st leg; rh – relay heat 1st leg; b – B final; † – en route to final mark; so – swim-off; tt – time trial

=== Women ===
Event	Time		Name	Club	Date	Meet	Location	Ref
50m freestyle	24.68	sf	Danielle Hill	Larne	25 May 2024	Irish Championships	Dublin, Ireland	
100m freestyle	54.45	h	Grace Davison	Ards	8 April 2026	Irish Championships	Bangor, Great Britain	
200m freestyle	1:58.88	sf	Ellen Walshe	Templeogue	15 April 2025	Irish Championships	Dublin, Ireland	
200m freestyle	1:58.72	h, not ratified	Ellen Walshe	Templeogue	10 April 2026	Irish Championships	Bangor, Great Britain	
400m freestyle	4:07.25		Michelle Smith	Ireland	22 July 1996	Olympic Games	Atlanta, United States	
800m freestyle	8:25.04		Gráinne Murphy	Ireland	12 August 2010	European Championships	Budapest, Hungary	
1500m freestyle	16:02.29		Gráinne Murphy	Ireland	14 August 2010	European Championships	Budapest, Hungary	
50m backstroke	27.64		Danielle Hill	Larne	4 May 2024	Ulster Championships	Bangor, United Kingdom	
100m backstroke	59.11	sf	Danielle Hill	Larne	22 May 2024	Irish Championships	Dublin, Ireland	
200m backstroke	2:09.69		Ellen Walshe	Templeogue	24 July 2026	Irish Summer Championships	Dublin, Ireland	
50m breaststroke	29.95		Mona McSharry	Ireland	16 August 2026	European Championships	Paris, France	
100m breaststroke	1:05.41		Mona McSharry	Ireland	12 August 2026	European Championships	Paris, France	
200m breaststroke	2:22.22		Mona McSharry	Marlins	10 April 2026	Irish Championships	Bangor, Great Britain	
50m butterfly	26.45		Danielle Hill	Larne	12 April 2024	McCullagh International Meet	Bangor, United Kingdom	
100m butterfly	57.96		Ellen Walshe	Templeogue	1 April 2023	Irish Championships	Dublin, Ireland	
200m butterfly	2:07.40		Ellen Walshe	Ireland	16 August 2026	European Championships	Paris, France	
200m individual medley	2:09.81		Ellen Walshe	Ireland	15 August 2026	European Championships	Paris, France	
400m individual medley	4:34.42		Ellen Walshe	Ireland	12 August 2026	European Championships	Paris, France	
4×50m freestyle relay	1:49.96		Rebecca Reid (27.31); Zoe Thomson (28.20); Victoria Catterson (27.35); Emma Reid (27.10)	Ards	10 April 2016	Swim Ulster	Bangor, United Kingdom	
4×100m freestyle relay	3:41.39		Grace Davison (55.23); Victoria Catterson (55.25); Emily Hughes (55.99); Danielle Hill (54.92)	Northern Ireland	24 July 2026	Commonwealth Games	Glasgow, Scotland	
4×200m freestyle relay	8:07.66	h	Sycerika McMahon (2:00.88); Melanie Nocher (2:01.28); Clare Dawson (2:02.07); Grainne Murphy (2:03.43)	Ireland	28 July 2011	World Championships	Shanghai, China	
4×50m medley relay	1:58.85		Rebecca Reid; Zoe Thomson; Emma Reid; Victoria Catterson	Ards	11 November 2017	-		
4×100m medley relay	3:57.26		Lottie Cullen (1:00.64); Mona McSharry (1:04.72); Ellen Walshe (57.73); Grace Davison (54.17)	Ireland	16 August 2026	European Championships	Paris, France	

Legend: # – Record awaiting ratification by Swim Ireland; WR – World record; ER – European record; e – equalled existing record;
Records not set in finals: h – heat; sf – semifinal; r – relay 1st leg; rh – relay heat 1st leg; b – B final; † – en route to final mark; so – swim-off; tt – time trial

=== Mixed relay ===
Event	Time		Name	Club	Date	Meet	Location	Ref
4×50 m freestyle relay	1:39.52		Conor Munn (23.36); Rebecca Reid (27.22); Emma Reid (26.28); Curtis Coulter (22.66)	Ards	21 July 2016	Irish Age Group Championships	Dublin, Ireland	
4×100 m freestyle relay	3:33.06	h	Max McCusker (50.66); Jordan Sloan (50.13); Erin Riordan (56.27); Victoria Catterson (56.00)	Ireland	22 May 2021	European Championships	Budapest, Hungary	
4×200 m freestyle relay	7:50.41		Brendan Hyland (1:51.40); Max McCusker (1:52.33); Naomi Trait (2:04.31); Victoria Catterson (2:02.37)	Ireland	18 May 2021	European Championships	Budapest, Hungary	
4×50 m medley relay	1:49.83		Conor Ferguson; James Brown; Emma Reid; Danielle Hill	Ireland	9 September 2015			
4×100 m medley relay	3:48.34	h	Lottie Cullen (1:02.30); Darragh Greene (59.75); Jack Cassin (51.91); Grace Davison (54.38)	Ireland	11 August 2026	European Championships	Paris, France	

Legend: # – Record awaiting ratification by Swim Ireland; e – equalled existing record;
Records not set in finals: h – heat; so – swim-off

== Short course (25 m) ==
=== Men ===
Event	Time		Name	Club	Date	Meet	Location	Ref
50m freestyle	21.07	h	Shane Ryan	Ireland	14 December 2024	World Championships	Budapest, Hungary	
100m freestyle	46.23	h	Shane Ryan	Ireland	11 December 2024	World Championships	Budapest, Hungary	
200m freestyle	1:41.48		Evan Bailey	Ireland	4 December 2025	European Championships	Lublin, Poland	
400m freestyle	3:35.47		Daniel Wiffen	Ireland	5 December 2023	European Championships	Otopeni, Romania	
800m freestyle	7:20.46	WR	Daniel Wiffen	Ireland	10 December 2023	European Championships	Otopeni, Romania	
1500m freestyle	14:09.11		Daniel Wiffen	Ireland	7 December 2023	European Championships	Otopeni, Romania	
50m backstroke	22.56		Shane Ryan	Ireland	13 December 2024	World Championships	Budapest, Hungary	
100m backstroke	50.10		John Shortt	Ireland	5 December 2025	European Championships	Lublin, Poland	
200m backstroke	1:47.89		John Shortt	Ireland	3 December 2025	European Championships	Lublin, Poland	
50m breaststroke	26.35		Alexander Murphy	Ireland	2 December 2015	European Championships	Netanya, Israel	
100m breaststroke	57.69	h	Alexander Murphy	Ireland	15 December 2017	European Championships	Copenhagen, Denmark	
200m breaststroke	2:05.76		Eoin Corby	Limerick	13 December 2025	Irish Championships	Dublin, Ireland	
50m butterfly	22.80		Shane Ryan	Toronto Titans	10 November 2020	International Swimming League	Budapest, Hungary	
100m butterfly	50.53		Shane Ryan	Toronto Titans	24 October 2020	International Swimming League	Budapest, Hungary	
200m butterfly	1:53.19	h, =	Brendan Hyland	Ireland	11 December 2018	World Championships	Hangzhou, China	
200m butterfly	1:53.19	h, =	Jack Cassin	Ireland	12 December 2024	World Championships	Budapest, Hungary	
100m individual medley	53.09		Jack McMillan	Bangor	6 November 2021	Ulster Championships	Belfast, Great Britain	
200m individual medley	1:55.80		John Shortt	Bluefin	12 December 2025	Irish Championships	Dublin, Ireland	
400m individual medley	4:11.05		Daniel Wiffen	Loughborough	9 December 2022	Scottish Championships	Edinburgh, Great Britain	
4×50m freestyle relay	1:27.06	h	Shane Ryan (21.72); Curtis Coulter (22.11); Jack McMillan (21.91); Jordan Sloan (21.32)	Ireland	4 December 2019	European Championships	Glasgow, Great Britain	
4×100m freestyle relay	3:10.19		Shane Ryan (46.68); Jordan Sloan (46.87); Jack McMillan (47.70); Robert Powell (48.94)	Ncd Athlone	12 December 2019	Irish Championships	Dublin, Ireland	
4×200m freestyle relay	6:59.54		Jack McMillan (1:42.84); Jordan Sloan (1:44.94); Finn McGeever (1:45.84); Robert Powell (1:45.92)	Ireland	19 December 2021	World Championships	Abu Dhabi, United Arab Emirates	
4×50m medley relay	1:34.14	h	Conor Ferguson (23.63); Darragh Greene (26.40); Shane Ryan (22.58); Jordan Sloan (21.53)	Ireland	8 December 2019	European Championships	Glasgow, Great Britain	
4×100m medley relay	3:26.60		Shane Ryan (50.85); Darragh Greene (57.46); Brendan Hyland (51.63); Jordan Sloan (46.66)	Ncd Tallaght	15 December 2019	Irish Championships	Dublin, Ireland	

Legend: # – Record awaiting ratification by Swim Ireland; WR – World record; ER – European record; e – equalled existing record;
Records not set in finals: h – heat; sf – semifinal; r – relay 1st leg; rh – relay heat 1st leg; b – B final; † – en route to final mark; so – swim-off; tt – time trial

=== Women ===
Event	Time		Name	Club	Date	Meet	Location	Ref
50 m freestyle	24.00		Danielle Hill	Larne	16 December 2023	Irish Winter Championships	Dublin, Ireland	
100 m freestyle	53.03		Danielle Hill	Larne	14 December 2023	Irish Championships	Dublin, Ireland	
200 m freestyle	1:53.72		Ellen Walshe	Templeogue	13 December 2025	Irish Championships	Dublin, Ireland	
400 m freestyle	4:02.86		Gráinne Murphy	Ireland	27 November 2010	European Championships	Eindhoven, Netherlands	
800 m freestyle	8:18.03		Gráinne Murphy	Ireland	17 December 2011	Duel in the Pool	Atlanta, United States	
1500 m freestyle	16:32.73		Antoinette Neamt	Tallaght	14 December 2014	Irish Championships	Lisburn, United Kingdom	
50m backstroke	26.33		Danielle Hill	Ireland	8 December 2023	European Championships	Otopeni, Romania	
100m backstroke	56.96		Lottie Cullen	Ulster	14 November 2025	BUCS Championships	Sheffield, United Kingdom	
100m backstroke	56.62	#	Lottie Cullen	NCU	30 October 2026	Grand Prix Brno	Brno, Czech Republic	
200m backstroke	2:04.29		Melanie Nocher	Ireland	11 December 2011	European Championships	Szczecin, Poland	
50m breaststroke	29.58		Mona McSharry	Ireland	25 October 2025	World Cup	Toronto, Canada	
100m breaststroke	1:03.84		Mona McSharry	Ireland	24 October 2025	World Cup	Toronto, Canada	
200m breaststroke	2:18.27		Mona McSharry	Ireland	23 October 2025	World Cup	Toronto, Canada	
50m butterfly	25.45	sf	Ellen Walshe	Ireland	10 December 2024	World Championships	Budapest, Hungary	
100m butterfly	55.50	sf	Ellen Walshe	Ireland	13 December 2024	World Championships	Budapest, Hungary	
200m butterfly	2:02.36 (Note: by official result source; 2:02.73 by Swim Ireland source, a typo)		Ellen Walshe	Ireland	23 October 2025 (Note: by official result source; 24 October 2025 by Swim Ireland source, a typo)	World Cup	Toronto, Canada	
100m individual medley	58.19	sf	Ellen Walshe	Ireland	3 December 2025	European Championships	Lublin, Poland	
200m individual medley	2:04.75		Ellen Walshe	Ireland	25 October 2025	World Cup	Toronto, Canada	
400m individual medley	4:22.97		Ellen Walshe	Ireland	24 October 2025	World Cup	Toronto, Canada	
4×50m freestyle relay	1:42.31	h	Fiona Doyle (26.04); Aisling Cooney (25.72); Clare Dawson (25.10); Melanie Nocher (25.45)	Ireland	12 December 2008	European Championships	Rijeka, Croatia	
4×100m freestyle relay	3:41.09		Mona McSharry (55.14); Danielle Hill (54.69); Victoria Catterson (55.96); Erin Riordan (55.30)	Larne	12 December 2019	Irish Championships	Dublin, Ireland	
4×200m freestyle relay	8:07.86		Victoria Catterson (2:02.02); Mona McSharry (2:03.18); Maria Godden (2:00.82); Rachel Bethel (2:02.64)	Kilkenny	13 December 2019	Irish Championships	Dublin, Ireland	
4×50m medley relay	1:49.31	h	Danielle Hill (27.14); Niamh Coyne (30.67); Mona McSharry (25.97); Maria Godden (25.53)	Ireland	8 December 2019	European Championships	Glasgow, Great Britain	
4×100m medley relay	3:59.95		Danielle Hill (58.84); Niamh Coyne (1:06.31); Ellen Walshe (59.81); Erin Riordan (54.99)	Ncd Tallaght	15 December 2019	Irish Championships	Dublin, Ireland	

Legend: # – Record awaiting ratification by Swim Ireland; WR – World record; ER – European record; e – equalled existing record;
Records not set in finals: h – heat; sf – semifinal; r – relay 1st leg; rh – relay heat 1st leg; b – B final; † – en route to final mark; so – swim-off; tt – time trial

=== Mixed relay ===
Event	Time		Name	Club	Date	Meet	Location	Ref
4×50m freestyle relay	1:31.86		Shane Ryan (21.41); Jack McMillan (21.73); Mona McSharry (24.54); Danielle Hill (24.18)	Ireland	7 December 2019	European Championships	Glasgow, Great Britain	
4×50m medley relay	1:40.54	h	John Shortt (23.70); Eoin Corby (26.50); Ellen Walshe (25.63); Rosalie Phelan (24.71)	Ireland	3 December 2025	European Championships	Lublin, Poland	

Legend: # – Record awaiting ratification by Swim Ireland; e – equalled existing record;
Records not set in finals: h – heat; so – swim-off
