= Tessa Cieplucha =

Canadian swimmer (born 1998)

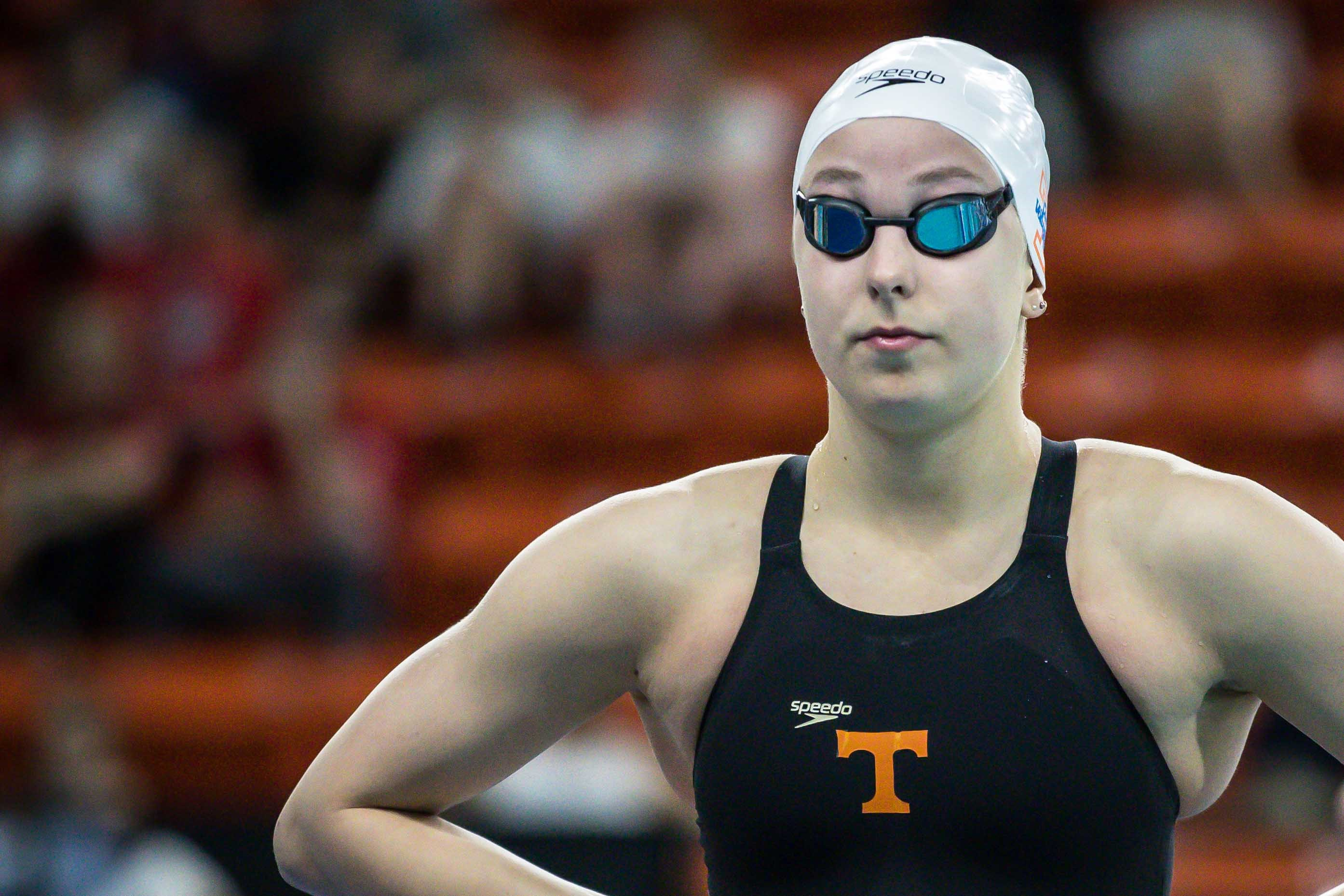

Personal information
- Nickname: Tess
- Born: 24 September 1998 (age 27) Oakville, Ontario, Canada
- Height: 175 cm (5 ft 9 in)
- Weight: 70 kg (154 lb)

Sport
- Sport: Swimming
- Strokes: Individual medley
- Club: Oakville Aquatics, Markham Aquatic Club
- College team: University of Tennessee
- Coach: Matt Kredich
Medal record
Women's swimming
Representing Canada
World Championships (SC)
Gold medal – first place	2021 Abu Dhabi	400 m medley
Gold medal – first place	2021 Abu Dhabi	4x200 m freestyle
Pan American Games
Gold medal – first place	2019 Lima	400 m medley

Tessa “Tess” Cieplucha (born 24 September 1998) is a Canadian swimmer who primarily competes in the individual medley. She is the former champion in the women’s 400m Individual Medley winning Gold at both 2021 Fina World Swimming Championships (25m) in Abu Dhabi, UAE, and 2019 Pan American Games in Lima, Peru.

Cieplucha is currently a Senior National Team member for Swimming Canada. She made her national team debut with Canada at the 2014 FINA World Junior Open Water Swimming Championships and swam the 1,500m freestyle. The following year at the 2015 FINA World Junior Swimming Championships where she finished 15th. She represented Canada at the 2020 Summer Olympic Games.

She currently represents the Toronto Titans part of the International Swimming League.

== Career ==
=== College ===
Cieplucha attended the University of Tennessee, Knoxville, where she competed for the Tennessee Volunteers Swimming and Diving team from 2016 - 2020, coached under Director of Swimming and Diving, Matt Kredich. In her final year Cieplucha was the 2020 SEC Champion in the 400y Individual Medley. She was part of the first place 800y Freestyle relay team, as well as placing fourth in both the 200y Individual Medley and 200y Butterfly events.

Cieplucha was part of the first ever University of Tennessee Lady Vols Swimming and Diving SEC Championship Team (2020).

=== Pan American Games ===
At the 2019 Pan American Games in Lima, Peru, Cieplucha was the champion in the 400m Individual Medley, and a finalist in 200m Breaststroke, placing 7th.

=== Olympic Games ===
Cieplucha made her Olympic debut at the 2020 Summer Olympic Games in Tokyo, Japan swimming the 400m Individual Medley. She finished in 14th place overall.

=== Fina World Swimming Championships ===
Cieplucha became a World Champion at the 2021 Fina World Swimming Championships (25m) in Abu Dhabi, United Arab Emirates. Cieplucha won Gold in the 400m Individual Medley event. She earned a second gold medal swimming in the prelim portion of the 4 x 200m Freestyle relay that won Gold at finals. Cieplucha was also a finalist in the 200 Breaststroke event placing 6th overall.

=== International Swimming League ===
In 2020 Cieplucha was a member of the International Swimming League, season 2, representing the Toronto Titans, an expansion team that finished seventh overall. The second season was a condensed six-week bubble held in Budapest, Hungary due to the COVID-19 pandemic. Cieplucha swam the 200m and 400m individual medley, 200m butterfly, and 400m freestyle events. Cieplucha had two wins in the 400m individual medley.

== Personal ==
Cieplucha is a graduate of University of Tennessee, Knoxville (2021) earning her degree, a double major in Geology & Environmental Sciences, and Geography.
