= Curtis Coulter =

Swimmer from Northern Ireland

Personal information
- Born: 6 October 1994 (age 31)

Sport
- Sport: Swimming

Curtis Coulter (born 6 October 1994) is a swimmer from Northern Ireland. He represented Ireland at the 2019 World Aquatics Championships in Gwangju, South Korea. He competed in the men's 100 metre freestyle event.

He represented Northern Ireland at the 2014 Commonwealth Games held in Glasgow, Scotland and at the 2018 Commonwealth Games held in Gold Coast, Australia.

As of June 2022, he is head coach of Ards Swimming Club in Newtownards, Northern Ireland.
