= Jordan Sloan =

Swimmer from Northern Ireland

Sport
- Sport: Swimming
- Strokes: Freestyle
- Club: Bangor

Jordan Sloan is a swimmer from Northern Ireland. He competed in European Championships, Commonwealth Games and World Championship throughout his career, he retired in January 2023.

Sloan still holds the National Records in the long course relays 4×100m freestyle relay, 4×200m freestyle relay, and Mixed 4×100m freestyle relay and short course in the 4×50m freestyle relay, 4×100m freestyle relay, 4×200m freestyle relay, 4×50m medley relay and 4×100m medley relay.
