= Virginia Bardach =

Argentine swimmer (born 1992)

Personal information
- Full name: Virginia Bardach Martín
- Born: 3 April 1992 (age 34) Córdoba, Argentina

Sport
- Sport: Swimming
Medal record
Women's swimming
Representing Argentina
Pan American Games
Gold medal – first place	2019 Lima	200 m butterfly
Silver medal – second place	2019 Lima	400 m medley
Bronze medal – third place	2019 Lima	4×100 m mixed medley
South American Championships
Gold medal – first place	2014 Mar del Plata	200 m butterfly
Gold medal – first place	2014 Mar del Plata	200 m medley
Gold medal – first place	2014 Mar del Plata	400 m medley
Gold medal – first place	2016 Asunción	200 m medley
Gold medal – first place	2016 Asunción	400 m medley
Gold medal – first place	2016 Asunción	4×100 m medley
Gold medal – first place	2018 Trujillo	200 m butterfly
Gold medal – first place	2018 Trujillo	400 m medley
Gold medal – first place	2018 Trujillo	4×200 m freestyle
Gold medal – first place	2021 Buenos Aires	400 m medley
Silver medal – second place	2012 Belém	200 m butterfly
Silver medal – second place	2014 Mar del Plata	4×200 m freestyle
Silver medal – second place	2016 Asunción	200 m butterfly
Silver medal – second place	2018 Trujillo	200 m medley
Silver medal – second place	2018 Trujillo	4×100 m medley
Silver medal – second place	2021 Buenos Aires	200 m butterfly
Silver medal – second place	2021 Buenos Aires	4×200 m freestyle
Bronze medal – third place	2012 Belém	200 m medley
Bronze medal – third place	2018 Trujillo	100 m butterfly
Bronze medal – third place	2021 Buenos Aires	200 m medley
South American Games
Gold medal – first place	2014 Santiago	200 m medley
Silver medal – second place	2010 Medellín	4×200 m freestyle
Silver medal – second place	2014 Santiago	400 m medley
Bronze medal – third place	2014 Santiago	200 m butterfly

Virginia Bardach Martín (born 3 April 1992) is an Argentine swimmer. She competed in the women's 400 metre individual medley event at the 2016 Summer Olympics. She also competed in the women's 400 metre individual medley event at the 2020 Summer Olympics.

== Career ==
She competed at the 2019 Pan American Games, winning a silver medal in the Women's 400m Individual Medley. and gold medal in Women's 200 m butterfly.
