= Melanie Nocher =

Irish swimmer (born 1988)

Personal information
- Born: 18 June 1988 (age 38) County Down, Northern Ireland
- Height: 1.79 m (5 ft 10 ½ in)

Sport
- Sport: Swimming
Medal record
Women's Swimming
Representing Ireland
European Championships (SC)
Bronze medal – third place	2011 Szczecin	200 m backstroke

Melanie Nocher (born 18 June 1988 in County Down, Northern Ireland) is an Irish swimmer. She competed in the 200 m freestyle and 200 m backstroke at the 2008 Summer Olympics. She competed at the 2012 Summer Olympics in the women's 100 metre backstroke, finishing in 33rd place in the heats, failing to qualify for the semifinals. She also competed in the 200 m backstroke but again did not qualify for the semifinals.

She has stripped off to be painted for the RTÉ documentary, simply titled Naked.
