= Niamh Coyne =

Irish swimmer (born 2001)

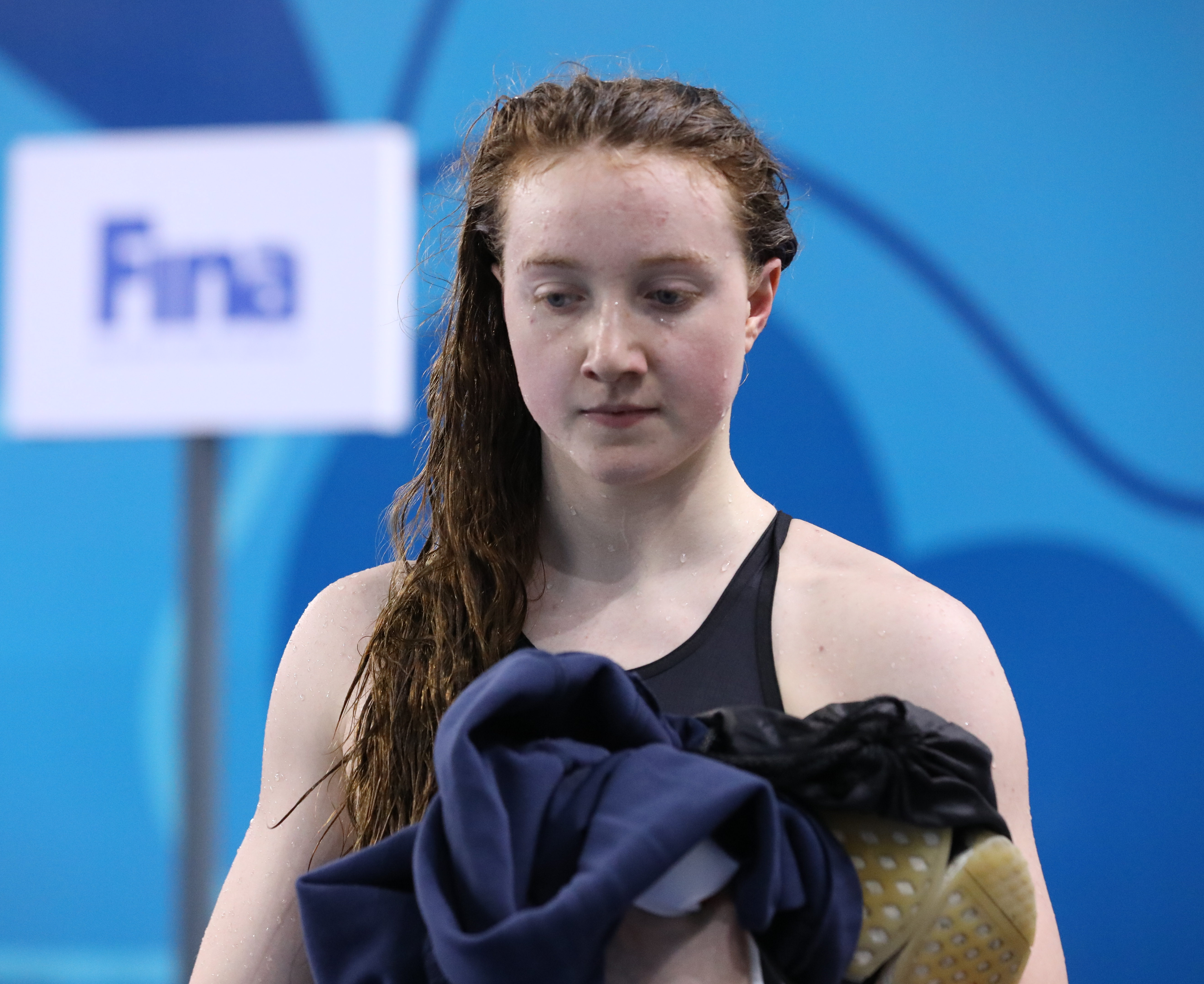
- Coyne at the 2018 Summer Youth Olympics

Personal information
- Nationality: Irish
- Born: 22 June 2001 (age 25)

Sport
- Sport: Swimming
- Strokes: Breaststroke
- Club: National Centre (Dublin)
- Coach: Ben Higson
Medal record
Women's swimming
Representing Ireland
Summer Youth Olympics
Silver medal – second place	2018 Buenos Aires	100 m breaststroke

Niamh Coyne (born 22 June 2001) is an Irish swimmer. She competed in the women's 50 metre breaststroke at the 2019 World Aquatics Championships held in Gwangju, South Korea and she did not advance to compete in the semi-finals.

== Career ==
In October 2021, Coyne was named to the Ireland roster for the 2021 World Short Course Championships in Abu Dhabi, United Arab Emirates. In the prelims heats of the 100 metre breaststroke on the fourth day of competition, Coyne ranked 18th with a 1:06.44 and did not qualify for the semifinals. Coyne also finished fifth in prelims heat two of the 200 metre breaststroke with a time of 2:23.03, placing fourteenth across all prelims heats.

At the 2022 U.S. Open Swimming Championships, held in Greensboro, United States, Coyne won the b-final of the 100 metre breaststroke with a time of 1:09.49.

Coyne was included in the Irish Team for the 2024 Short Course World Swimming Championships in Hungary she finished in 40th in the 100m Breaststroke
