= Daniela Alfaro =

Costa Rican swimmer (born 2002)

Personal information
- Nationality: Costa Rican
- Born: 6 August 2002 (age 23)

Sport
- Sport: Swimming

Daniela Alfaro (born 6 August 2002) is a Costa Rican swimmer. She competed in the women's 200 metre butterfly event at the 2018 FINA World Swimming Championships (25 m), in Hangzhou, China.
