= Brendan Hyland =

Irish swimmer

Personal information
- Born: 23 September 1994 (age 31) Dublin, Ireland

Sport
- Sport: Swimming
- Strokes: Butterfly

Brendan Hyland (born 23 September 1994) is an Irish swimmer. He competed in the men's 100 metre butterfly event at the 2017 World Aquatics Championships. Hyland has also competed in the Tokyo 2020 Olympics.
