= Darragh Greene =

Irish swimmer

Personal information
- Nationality: Irish
- Born: 20 October 1995 (age 30) Newtownforbes, Ireland

Sport
- Sport: Swimming
- Strokes: Breaststroke

Darragh Greene (born 20 October 1995) is an Irish swimmer. He competed in the men's 100 metre breaststroke at the 2019 World Aquatics Championships. He qualified to represent Ireland at the 2020 Summer Olympics In Tokyo Japan.
