= Ireland at the 2011 World Aquatics Championships =

Flag of Ireland

Ireland competed at the 2011 World Aquatics Championships in Shanghai, China between July 16 and 31, 2011.

== Open water swimming ==
Men

Athlete	Event	Final	
Athlete	Event	Time	Position
Chris Bryan	Men's 5km	56:28.0	8
Chris Bryan	Men's 10km	1:56:52.8	33

== Swimming ==
Ireland qualified 5 swimmers.

Men

Athlete	Event	Heats		Semifinals		Final	
Athlete	Event	Time	Rank	Time	Rank	Time	Rank
Barry Murphy	Men's 50m Freestyle	22.96	35	did not advance			
Barry Murphy	Men's 50m Breaststroke	28.13	18	did not advance			
Barry Murphy	Men's 100m Breaststroke	1:02.50	47	did not advance			

Women

Athlete	Event	Heats		Semifinals		Final	
Athlete	Event	Time	Rank	Time	Rank	Time	Rank
Melanie Nocher	Women's 200m Freestyle	2:01.33	31	did not advance			
Melanie Nocher	Women's 100m Backstroke	1:03.43	37	did not advance			
Melanie Nocher	Women's 200m Backstroke	2:13.39	23	did not advance			
Sycerika McMahon	Women's 400m Freestyle	4:16.44	24			did not advance	
Sycerika McMahon	Women's 50m Breaststroke	31.49	13 Q	31.83	13	did not advance	
Sycerika McMahon	Women's 100m Breaststroke	1:09.91	27	did not advance			
Grainne Murphy	Women's 800m Freestyle	8:35.17	17			did not advance	
Grainne Murphy	Women's 1500m Freestyle	16:14.81	10			did not advance	
Grainne Murphy	Women's 400m IM	DNS				did not advance	
Sycerika McMahon; Melanie Nocher; Clare Dawson; Grainne Murphy	Women's 4 × 200 m Freestyle Relay	8:07.66	16			did not advance	
