= Swim Ireland =

Governing body for water sports on the island of Ireland

- Association crest
- Founded: 1998
- FINA affiliation: 1998
- LEN
- Website: www.swimireland.ie

Swim Ireland previous logo

Swim Ireland (Irish: Cumann Snámh Éireann) is the national governing body of swimming, open water swimming, synchronised swimming, diving, and water polo on the island of Ireland (Republic of Ireland and Northern Ireland). Swim Ireland is affiliated with European Aquatics, World Aquatics and the Olympic Council of Ireland.

Competitors from Northern Ireland can opt to compete under the aegis of Swim Ireland or Aquatics GB in international competitions, with the exception of the Commonwealth Games, where they can compete for Northern Ireland.

== History ==
Swim Ireland emerged in 1998 from the Irish Amateur Swimming Association (IASA), that was dissolved in January 1999 following proven sexual abuse and other scandals involving senior coaches. Swim Ireland assumed IASA abuse victim liabilities.

== Domestic competitions ==
Swim Ireland runs national meets which include:

- Dave McCullagh Memorial (March/April)
- Irish Open Championships (April/May)
- Irish Age Groups Division 2 (June)
- Irish Age Group/Youth Championships (July)
- Irish Open SC Championships (July/August)
- Irish Open Diving Championships (November)
- Irish Age Groups Division 1

Swim Ireland works with the different regions in organising competitions such as provincial Age Group Championships as well as other graded, distance and inter-club meets. They also work with the Irish Schools Swimming Association who run the Irish Minor and Secondary Schools Championships.

The Age Group InterProvincial takes place every year at the beginning of the summer months for swimmers up to the age of 16 years. This is where teams from the 4 provinces of Ireland (Ulster, Munster, Leinster and Connacht) compete against each other.

These competitions take place in either the National Aquatic Centre, Dublin or at University Arena, Limerick. Both pools have the compatibility to be changed into 50m and 25m.

In 2003, Swim Ireland hosted the European Short Course Championships at the National Aquatic Centre in Dublin. The event was a resounding success with a world record being broken by the Dutch in the final race, the men's 4x50m Freestyle relay.

Swim Ireland also organise The Liffey Swim which takes place in August to September annually.

== Irish swimmers ==
Swim Ireland recently introduced a new squad structure. This begins with Club Level, then Regional Level, National Level and finally the Elite Squad.

== See also ==
- List of Olympic-size swimming pools in Ireland
- Sport in Ireland
- Eddie Heron
- Ger Doyle
