= Swimming at the 2024 Summer Olympics – Women's 200-metre individual medley =

Women's 200-metre individual medley at the Games of the XXXIII Olympiad
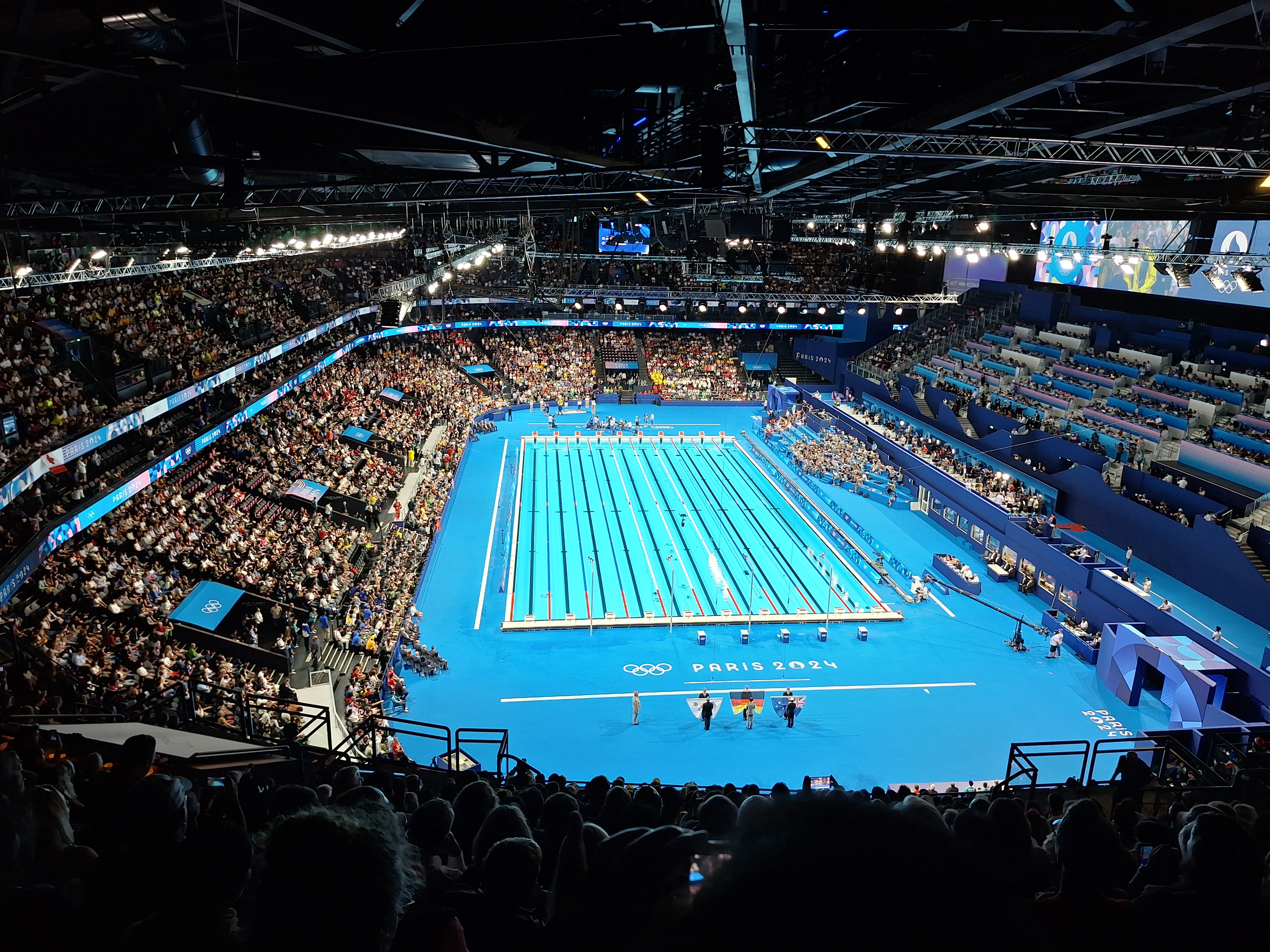
- Paris La Défense Arena after it was converted to a swimming pool for the swimming events
- Venue: Paris La Défense Arena
- Dates: 2 August 2024 (Heats and Semis); 3 August 2024 (Final)
- Competitors: 34 from 27 nations
- Winning time: 2:06.56 OR

Medalists
1st place, gold medalist(s)		Summer McIntosh	Canada
2nd place, silver medalist(s)		Kate Douglass	United States
3rd place, bronze medalist(s)		Kaylee McKeown	Australia

The women's 200-metre individual medley event at the 2024 Summer Olympics was held on 2 and 3 August 2024 at Paris La Défense Arena, which was converted to a swimming pool for the swimming events.

The US' Kate Douglass, Australian Kaylee McKeown, Canadian Summer McIntosh and the US' Alex Walsh were the considered the most likely to win for the event. All four progressed through the heats (preliminary rounds) and semifinals to the final.

In the final, McIntosh won with a new Olympic and world junior record of 2:06.56, while Douglass finished second with 2:06.92, Walsh finished third with 2:07.06 and McKeown finished fourth with 2:08.08. However, after the race Walsh was disqualified for doing an illegal backstroke to breaststroke turn, resulting in McKeown being awarded the bronze medal. McIntosh's win made her the first Canadian Olympian to win three gold medals at a single Games.

== Background ==
The US' Kate Douglass won bronze at the previous Olympics, won the event at the 2023 and 2024 World Championships, and she had the fastest qualifying time of 2:06.79, set at the US Olympic Trials. Alex Walsh, also from the US, won the 2022 World Championships and won silver at the 2023 Championships. Walsh had the fourth fastest qualifying time of 2:07.63. Australia's 2022 World Championships silver medallist Kaylee McKeown had the third fastest qualifying time of 2:06.99, and Canadian Summer McIntosh had the second fastest qualifying time of 2:06.89.

SwimSwam predicted McKeown would win, Douglass would come second and McIntosh would come third, while Swimming World predicted McIntosh would win, Douglass would come second and McKeown would come third. Prior to the start of the event, Douglass, McKeown and McIntosh had all won gold medals in previous events, and Yanyan Li from SwimSwam believed that the event "looked to be an even higher-stakes race than expected".

The event was held at Paris La Défense Arena, which was converted to a swimming pool for the swimming events.

== Qualification ==
Each National Olympic Committee (NOC) was permitted to enter a maximum of two qualified athletes in each individual event, but only if both of them had attained the Olympic Qualifying Time (OQT). For this event, the OQT was 2:11.47. World Aquatics then filled the rest of the event places with athletes qualifying through universality; NOCs were given one event entry for each gender, which could be used by any athlete regardless of qualification time, providing the spaces had not already been taken by athletes from that nation who had achieved the OQT. In total, 23 athletes qualified through achieving the OQT, while 11 athletes qualified through universality places.

Top 10 fastest qualification times
Swimmer	Country	Time	Competition
Kate Douglass	United States	2:06.79	2024 United States Olympic Trials
Summer McIntosh	Canada	2:06.89	2023 Canadian Trials
Kaylee McKeown	Australia	2:06.99	2024 Australian Championships
Alex Walsh	United States	2:07.63	2024 Pro Swim Series Knoxville
Sydney Pickrem	Canada	2:07.68	2024 Canadian Olympic Trials
Yu Yiting	China	2:07.75	2022 Asian Games
Anastasia Gorbenko	Israel	2:08.55	2024 Mare Nostrum Barcelona
Marrit Steenbergen	Netherlands	2:08.86	2024 Eindhoven Qualification Meet
Abbie Wood	Great Britain	2:08.91	2024 Aquatics GB Swimming Championships
Yui Ohashi	Japan	2:09.17	2024 Japanese Olympic Trials

== Heats ==
Three heats (preliminary rounds) took place on 2 August 2024, starting at 11:17. (Note: All times are Central European Summer Time (UTC+2)) The swimmers with the best 16 times in the heats advanced to the semifinals. McIntosh qualified with the fastest time of 2:09.90. Walsh, Douglass and McKeown were also among those that qualified.

Results
Rank	Heat	Lane	Swimmer	Nation	Time	Notes
1	3	4	Summer McIntosh	Canada	2:09.90	Q
2	3	5	Yu Yiting	China	2:10.28	Q
3	5	5	Alex Walsh	United States	2:10.48	Q
4	4	5	Sydney Pickrem	Canada	2:10.63	Q
5	4	4	Kate Douglass	United States	2:10.70	Q
6	3	6	Ella Ramsay	Australia	2:10.75	Q
7	3	3	Abbie Wood	Great Britain	2:10.95	Q
8	5	2	Ye Shiwen	China	2:10.96	Q
9	5	4	Kaylee McKeown	Australia	2:11.26	Q
10	3	2	Charlotte Bonnet	France	2:11.47	Q
11	5	3	Anastasia Gorbenko	Israel	2:11.53	Q
12	3	1	Emma Carrasco	Spain	2:11.54	Q
13	4	2	Shiho Matsumoto	Japan	2:11.67	Q
14	5	6	Yui Ohashi	Japan	2:11.70	Q
15	5	1	Ellen Walshe	Ireland	2:11.81	Q
16	4	1	Rebecca Meder	South Africa	2:11.96	Q
17	5	7	Kim Seo-yeong	South Korea	2:12.42	
18	4	6	Sara Franceschi	Italy	2:12.88	
18	4	7	Freya Colbert	Great Britain	2:12.88	
20	4	3	Marrit Steenbergen	Netherlands	2:13.21	
21	2	5	Kristen Romano	Puerto Rico	2:13.32	
22	4	8	Barbora Seemanová	Czech Republic	2:13.47	
23	3	8	Tamara Potocká	Slovakia	2:14.20	
24	2	4	Lena Kreundl	Austria	2:15.04	
25	3	7	Dalma Sebestyén	Hungary	2:15.16	
26	2	6	Ieva Maļuka	Latvia	2:15.79	
27	2	1	Võ Thị Mỹ Tiên	Vietnam	2:17.18	
28	5	8	Lea Polonsky	Israel	2:17.53	
29	2	2	McKenna DeBever	Peru	2:17.61	
30	2	7	Nicole Frank	Uruguay	2:18.00	
31	1	4	Azzahra Permatahani	Indonesia	2:20.51	
32	1	5	Valerie Tarazi	Palestine	2:20.56	NR
33	1	3	Jayla Pina	Cape Verde	2:24.51	NR
	2	3	Han An-chi	Chinese Taipei	DSQ	

== Semifinals ==
Two semifinals took place on 2 August, starting at 21:31. The swimmers with the best eight times in the semifinals advanced to the final. Canada's Sydney Pickrem won the first semifinal to qualify with the fifth fastest time of 2:09.65, while Alex Walsh won the second semifinal to qualify with the fastest time of 2:07.45. Douglass, McKeown, Great Britain's Abbie Wood, China's Yu Yiting and Australia's Ella Ramsay also qualified. Ramsay later withdrew from the final due to illness, leaving only seven swimmers in the final.

Japan's Yui Ohashi, who won the event at the previous Olympics, did not qualify. South Africa's Rebecca Meder beat her country's national record with 2:10.67, but the time was not fast enough to qualify.

Results
Rank	Heat	Lane	Swimmer	Nation	Time	Notes
1	2	5	Alex Walsh	United States	2:07.45	Q
2	2	4	Summer McIntosh	Canada	2:08.30	Q
3	2	3	Kate Douglass	United States	2:08.59	Q
4	2	6	Abbie Wood	Great Britain	2:09.64	Q
5	1	5	Sydney Pickrem	Canada	2:09.65	Q
6	1	4	Yu Yiting	China	2:09.74	Q
7	2	2	Kaylee McKeown	Australia	2:09.97	Q
8	1	3	Ella Ramsay	Australia	2:10.16	Q
9	2	7	Anastasia Gorbenko	Israel	2:10.32	
10	1	6	Ye Shiwen	China	2:10.45	
11	1	8	Rebecca Meder	South Africa	2:10.67	NR
12	1	1	Yui Ohashi	Japan	2:10.94	
13	2	8	Ellen Walshe	Ireland	2:11.35	
14	2	1	Shiho Matsumoto	Japan	2:11.85	
15	1	7	Emma Carrasco	Spain	2:12.25	
16	1	2	Charlotte Bonnet	France	2:12.80	

== Final ==
The final took place at 21:08 on 3 August. Walsh led for the first 150 metres of the race, but over the final 50 metres she was overtaken by McIntosh and Douglass. McIntosh won with a new Olympic record, world junior record and national record of 2:06.56. Douglass finished second with 2:06.92, Walsh finished third with 2:07.06 and McKeown finished fourth with 2:08.08. After the race, Walsh was disqualified for doing a backstroke to breaststroke turn that was against the rules, leading to McKeown being awarded the bronze medal instead.

McIntosh's Olympic record broke that of Katinka Hosszú's from the Rio 2016 Olympics. Her win made her the first Canadian Olympian to win three gold medals at a single Games, and it was her fourth medal at the 2024 Games overall.

Results
Rank	Lane	Swimmer	Nation	Time	Notes
1st place, gold medalist(s)	5	Summer McIntosh	Canada	2:06.56	OR, WJ, NR
2nd place, silver medalist(s)	3	Kate Douglass	United States	2:06.92	
3rd place, bronze medalist(s)	1	Kaylee McKeown	Australia	2:08.08	
4	7	Yu Yiting	China	2:08.49	
5	6	Abbie Wood	Great Britain	2:09.51	
6	2	Sydney Pickrem	Canada	2:09.74	
–	8	Ella Ramsay	Australia	DNS	
–	4	Alex Walsh	United States	DSQ	2:07.06 before DSQ

Statistics
Name	50 metre split	100 metre split	150 metre split	Time	Stroke rate (strokes/min)
Summer McIntosh	0:26.80	0:58.60	1:36.13	2:06.56	47.0
Kate Douglass	0:26.73	1:01.05	1:36.80	2:06.92	41.5
Kaylee McKeown	0:27.59	0:59.27	01:37.04	2:08.08	48.1
Yu Yiting	0:27.31	1:00.05	1:37.42	2:08.49	44.7
Abbie Wood	0:27.43	1:00.21	1:38.08	2:09.51	45.7
Sydney Pickrem	0:27.89	1:00.36	1:37.55	2:09.74	44.7
