= 2014 FINA World Swimming Championships (25 m) – Women's 400 metre individual medley =

Women's 400 metre individual medley at the 2014 FINA World Swimming Championships (25 m)
- Dates: 3 December
- Competitors: 28 from 22 nations
- Winning time: 4:19.86

Medalists
gold medal	Mireia Belmonte	Spain
silver medal	Katinka Hosszú	Hungary
bronze medal	Hannah Miley	Great Britain

The women's 400 metre individual medley competition of the 2014 FINA World Swimming Championships (25 m) was held on 3 December.

== Records ==
Prior to the competition, the existing world and championship records were as follows.

	Name	Nation	Time	Location	Date
World record	Katinka Hosszú	Hungary	4:20.83	Doha	28 August 2014
Championship record	Hannah Miley	Great Britain	4:23.14	Istanbul	12 December 2012

The following records were established during the competition:

Date	Event	Name	Nation	Time	Record
3 December	Heats	Katinka Hosszú	Hungary	4:21.05	CR
3 December	Final	Mireia Belmonte	Spain	4:19.86	WR, CR

== Results ==
=== Heats ===
The heats were held at 12:16.

Rank	Heat	Lane	Name	Nationality	Time	Notes
1	3	4	Katinka Hosszú	Hungary	4:21.05	Q, CR
2	2	4	Mireia Belmonte	Spain	4:26.16	Q
3	2	3	Hannah Miley	Great Britain	4:27.45	Q
4	3	5	Caitlin Leverenz	United States	4:28.43	Q
5	2	5	Elizabeth Beisel	United States	4:28.75	Q
6	3	0	Barbora Závadová	Czech Republic	4:29.95	Q
7	3	3	Miho Takahashi	Japan	4:30.20	Q
8	3	6	Sakiko Shimizu	Japan	4:31.20	Q
9	2	7	Zsuzsanna Jakabos	Hungary	4:31.95	
10	3	1	María Vilas	Spain	4:32.54	
11	3	2	Yana Martynova	Russia	4:33.21	
12	2	2	Ellen Fullerton	Australia	4:33.52	
13	1	2	Nguyễn Thị Ánh Viên	Vietnam	4:34.49	
14	3	9	Tanja Kylliainen	Finland	4:35.91	
15	3	7	Viktoriia Maliutina	Russia	4:36.91	
16	1	3	Anja Klinar	Slovenia	4:37.23	
17	2	8	Emily Overholt	Canada	4:37.42	
18	2	0	Julie Lauridsen	Denmark	4:38.58	
19	2	6	Zhou Min	China	4:40.67	
20	1	5	Ranokhon Amanova	Uzbekistan	4:41.39	
21	2	1	Mei Xueyan	China	4:41.81	
22	1	4	Florencia Perotti	Argentina	4:48.71	
23	2	9	Samantha Arévalo	Ecuador	4:50.96	
24	1	1	Hannah Dato	Philippines	4:54.74	
25	1	6	Souad Cherouati	Algeria	4:55.72	
26	1	7	Antonia Roth	Namibia	4:57.68	
27	1	8	María Far Núñez	Panama	5:03.98	
28	1	0	Diana Basho	Albania	5:43.88	
—	3	8	Stefania Pirozzi	Italy		DNS

=== Final ===
The final was held at 19:08.

Rank	Lane	Name	Nationality	Time	Notes
1st place, gold medalist(s)	5	Mireia Belmonte	Spain	4:19.86	WR
2nd place, silver medalist(s)	4	Katinka Hosszú	Hungary	4:22.94	
3rd place, bronze medalist(s)	3	Hannah Miley	Great Britain	4:24.74	
4	2	Elizabeth Beisel	United States	4:25.56	
5	1	Miho Takahashi	Japan	4:27.61	
6	6	Caitlin Leverenz	United States	4:28.74	
7	7	Barbora Závadová	Czech Republic	4:30.95	
8	8	Sakiko Shimizu	Japan	4:32.92	
