= 2014 FINA World Swimming Championships (25 m) – Women's 200 metre individual medley =

Women's 200 metre individual medley at the 2014 FINA World Swimming Championships (25 m)
- Dates: 6 December
- Competitors: 45 from 34 nations
- Winning time: 2:01.86

Medalists
gold medal	Katinka Hosszú	Hungary
silver medal	Siobhan-Marie O'Connor	Great Britain
bronze medal	Melanie Margalis	United States

The Women's 200 metre individual medley competition of the 2014 FINA World Swimming Championships (25 m) was held on 6 December.

== Records ==
Prior to the competition, the existing world and championship records were as follows.

	Name	Nation	Time	Location	Date
World record	Katinka Hosszú	Hungary	2:02.13	Dubai	31 August 2014
Championship record	Ye Shiwen	China	2:04.64	Istanbul	15 December 2012

The following records were established during the competition:

Date	Event	Name	Nation	Time	Record
6 December	Final	Katinka Hosszú	Hungary	2:01.86	WR

== Results ==
=== Heats ===
The heats were held at 11:51.

Rank	Heat	Lane	Name	Nationality	Time	Notes
1	4	3	Evelyn Verrasztó	Hungary	2:06.93	Q
2	4	4	Caitlin Leverenz	United States	2:07.01	Q
3	5	4	Katinka Hosszú	Hungary	2:07.04	Q
4	3	7	Melanie Margalis	United States	2:07.05	Q
5	5	5	Siobhan-Marie O'Connor	Great Britain	2:07.38	Q
6	3	3	Hannah Miley	Great Britain	2:08.22	Q
7	5	2	Sakiko Shimizu	Japan	2:08.52	Q
8	5	7	Ellen Fullerton	Australia	2:08.72	Q
9	3	4	Kanako Watanabe	Japan	2:08.74	
10	4	5	Mireia Belmonte	Spain	2:08.75	
11	3	5	Lisa Zaiser	Austria	2:09.03	
12	5	6	Amit Ivry	Israel	2:09.26	
13	5	3	Emily Seebohm	Australia	2:09.31	
14	4	2	Zhou Min	China	2:09.70	
15	4	6	Ganna Dzerkal	Ukraine	2:09.75	
16	3	2	Alicja Tchórz	Poland	2:10.46	
17	5	8	Tanja Kylliainen	Finland	2:10.51	
18	5	0	Stefania Pirozzi	Italy	2:10.57	
19	4	7	Louise Hansson	Sweden	2:10.94	
20	4	1	Barbora Závadová	Czech Republic	2:11.40	
21	1	7	Nguyễn Thị Ánh Viên	Vietnam	2:12.15	
22	3	0	Ranohon Amanova	Uzbekistan	2:12.18	
23	3	6	Viktoria Andreeva	Russia	2:12.45	
24	4	6	Emily Overholt	Canada	2:12.88	
25	5	1	Yana Martynova	Russia	2:13.15	
26	5	9	Rene Warnes	South Africa	2:14.93	
27	3	1	Mei Xueyan	China	2:16.10	
28	2	8	Hamida Nefsi	Algeria	2:18.46	
29	2	3	Souad Cherouati	Algeria	2:18.60	
30	4	0	Florencia Perotti	Argentina	2:18.77	
31	3	9	Alessia Polieri	Italy	2:19.19	
32	2	1	Sonja Adelaar	Namibia	2:19.33	
33	2	2	Evangelio Dato	Philippines	2:19.89	
34	2	7	Defne Kurt	Turkey	2:20.41	
35	2	9	Antonia Roth	Namibia	2:20.56	
36	2	6	Lara Butler	Cayman Islands	2:20.85	
37	2	4	Sofía López	Paraguay	2:22.11	
38	2	5	María Far Núñez	Panama	2:22.86	
39	1	1	Matelita Buadromo	Fiji	2:23.80	
40	4	9	Tatjana Schoenmaker	South Africa	2:23.83	
41	1	5	Kimiko Raheem	Sri Lanka	2:26.65	
42	2	0	Tan Chi Yan	Macau	2:28.18	
43	1	4	Malavika Vishwanath	India	2:29.65	
44	1	6	Savannah Tkatchenko	Papua New Guinea	2:30.07	
45	1	2	Felicity Passon	Seychelles	2:31.74	
—	1	3	Roxanne Yu	Philippines		DNS
—	3	8	Eygló Ósk Gústafsdóttir	Iceland		DNS

=== Final ===
The final was held at 19:25.

Rank	Lane	Name	Nationality	Time	Notes
1st place, gold medalist(s)	3	Katinka Hosszú	Hungary	2:01.86	WR
2nd place, silver medalist(s)	2	Siobhan-Marie O'Connor	Great Britain	2:05.87	
3rd place, bronze medalist(s)	6	Melanie Margalis	United States	2:06.68	
4	7	Hannah Miley	Great Britain	2:06.84	
5	5	Caitlin Leverenz	United States	2:06.90	
6	4	Evelyn Verrasztó	Hungary	2:07.05	
7	1	Sakiko Shimizu	Japan	2:08.65	
8	8	Ellen Fullerton	Australia	2:09.62	
