= Swimming at the 2018 Asian Games – Women's 200 metre individual medley =

Women's 200 metre individual medley at the 2018 Asian Games
- Venue: Gelora Bung Karno Aquatic Stadium
- Date: 24 August 2018
- Competitors: 19 from 12 nations

Medalists
gold medal	Kim Seo-yeong	South Korea
silver medal	Yui Ohashi	Japan
bronze medal	Miho Teramura	Japan

The women's 200 metre individual medley event at the 2018 Asian Games took place on 24 August at the Gelora Bung Karno Aquatic Stadium.

== Schedule ==
All times are Western Indonesia Time (UTC+07:00)

Date	Time	Event
Friday, 24 August 2018	09:54	Heats
Friday, 24 August 2018	19:13	Final

== Records ==
Prior to this competition, the existing world, Asian and Games records were as follows.

World Record	Katinka Hosszú (HUN)	2:06.12	Kazan, Russia	3 August 2015
Asian Record	Ye Shiwen (CHN)	2:07.57	London, United Kingdom	31 July 2012
Games Record	Ye Shiwen (CHN)	2:08.94	Incheon, South Korea	26 September 2014

== Results ==
Legend

- DNS — Did not start

=== Heats ===
Rank	Heat	Athlete	Time	Notes
1	2	Yui Ohashi (JPN)	2:13.55	
2	3	Zhou Min (CHN)	2:13.82	
3	1	Miho Teramura (JPN)	2:15.73	
4	1	Yang Chang (CHN)	2:16.45	
5	3	Kim Seo-yeong (KOR)	2:16.73	
6	2	Natalie Kan (HKG)	2:17.90	
7	1	Jamie Yeung (HKG)	2:18.39	
8	2	Ressa Kania Dewi (INA)	2:18.69	
9	3	Samantha Yeo (SGP)	2:18.99	
10	3	Quah Jing Wen (SGP)	2:19.26	
11	2	Nguyễn Thị Ánh Viên (VIE)	2:19.79	
12	3	Azzahra Permatahani (INA)	2:20.23	
13	1	Elizaveta Rogozhnikova (KGZ)	2:25.78	
14	3	Batbayaryn Enkhkhüslen (MGL)	2:30.20	
15	2	Nooran Ba Matraf (YEM)	2:34.18	
16	1	Mishael Aisha Ayub (PAK)	2:38.70	
17	3	Altanshagain Kherlen (MGL)	2:47.28	
18	1	Aishath Sausan (MDV)	3:03.64	
—	2	Anmau Ahmed Saleem (MDV)	DNS	

=== Final ===
Rank	Athlete	Time	Notes
1st place, gold medalist(s)	Kim Seo-yeong (KOR)	2:08.34	GR
2nd place, silver medalist(s)	Yui Ohashi (JPN)	2:08.88	
3rd place, bronze medalist(s)	Miho Teramura (JPN)	2:10.98	
4	Zhou Min (CHN)	2:11.42	
5	Yang Chang (CHN)	2:13.68	
6	Jamie Yeung (HKG)	2:17.63	
7	Ressa Kania Dewi (INA)	2:18.62	
8	Natalie Kan (HKG)	2:18.82	
