= 2018 Pan Pacific Swimming Championships – Women's 400 metre individual medley =

Women's 400 metre individual medley at the 2018 Pan Pacific Swimming Championships
- Venue: Tokyo Tatsumi International Swimming Center
- Dates: 9 August (heats & finals)
- Competitors: 10 from 5 nations
- Winning time: 4:33.77

Medalists
gold medal	Yui Ohashi	Japan
silver medal	Melanie Margalis	United States
bronze medal	Sakiko Shimizu	Japan

The women's 400 metre individual medley competition at the 2018 Pan Pacific Swimming Championships took place on August 9 at the Tokyo Tatsumi International Swimming Center. The defending champion was Elizabeth Beisel of the United States.

== Records ==
Prior to this competition, the existing world and Pan Pacific records were as follows:

World record	Katinka Hosszú (HUN)	4:26.36	Rio de Janeiro, Brazil	6 August 2016
Pan Pacific Championships record	Elizabeth Beisel (USA)	4:31.99	Gold Coast, Australia	22 August 2014

== Results ==
All times are in minutes and seconds.

KEY:	QA	Qualified A Final	QB	Qualified B Final	CR	Championships record	NR	National record	PB	Personal best	SB	Seasonal best

=== Heats ===
The first round was held on 9 August from 10:00.

Only two swimmers from each country may advance to the A or B final. If a country does not qualify any swimmer to the A final, that same country may qualify up to three swimmers to the B final.

Rank	Name	Nationality	Time	Notes
1	Yui Ohashi	Japan	4:36.05	QA
2	Melanie Margalis	United States	4:39.09	QA
3	Sakiko Shimizu	Japan	4:39.76	QA
4	Emily Overholt	Canada	4:40.63	QA
5	Brooke Forde	United States	4:40.76	QA
6	Allyson McHugh	United States	4:41.08	QB
7	Erika Seltenreich-Hodgson	Canada	4:44.64	QA
8	Ye Huiyan	China	4:57.65	QA
9	Chloe Isleta	Philippines	4:59.21	QA
10	Gianna Garcia	Philippines	5:28.80	QB

=== B Final ===
The B final was held on 9 August from 17:30.

Rank	Name	Nationality	Time	Notes
9	Allyson McHugh	United States	4:41.04	
10	Gianna Garcia	Philippines	5:27.19	

=== A Final ===
The A final was held on 9 August from 17:30.

Rank	Name	Nationality	Time	Notes
1st place, gold medalist(s)	Yui Ohashi	Japan	4:33.77	
2nd place, silver medalist(s)	Melanie Margalis	United States	4:35.60	
3rd place, bronze medalist(s)	Sakiko Shimizu	Japan	4:36.27	
4	Brooke Forde	United States	4:39.22	
5	Emily Overholt	Canada	4:39.48	
6	Erika Seltenreich-Hodgson	Canada	4:40.22	
7	Ye Huiyan	China	4:52.40	
8	Chloe Isleta	Philippines	4:58.81	
