= Swimming at the 2018 Asian Games – Women's 400 metre individual medley =

Swimming event

Women's 400 metre individual medley at the 2018 Asian Games
- Venue: Gelora Bung Karno Aquatic Stadium
- Date: 21 August 2018
- Competitors: 12 from 7 nations

Medalists
gold medal	Yui Ohashi	Japan
silver medal	Kim Seo-yeong	South Korea
bronze medal	Sakiko Shimizu	Japan

The women's 400 metre individual medley event at the 2018 Asian Games took place on 21 August at the Gelora Bung Karno Aquatic Stadium.

== Schedule ==
All times are Western Indonesia Time (UTC+07:00)

Date	Time	Event
Tuesday, 21 August 2018	09:21	Heats
Tuesday, 21 August 2018	18:21	Final

== Records ==
Prior to this competition, the existing world, Asian and Games records were as follows.

World Record	Katinka Hosszú (HUN)	4:26.36	Rio de Janeiro, Brazil	6 August 2016
Asian Record	Ye Shiwen (CHN)	4:28.43	London, United Kingdom	28 July 2012
Games Record	Ye Shiwen (CHN)	4:32.97	Incheon, South Korea	23 September 2014

== Results ==
Legend

- DNS — Did not start

=== Heats ===
Rank	Heat	Athlete	Time	Notes
1	2	Yui Ohashi (JPN)	4:42.11	
2	2	Zhou Min (CHN)	4:42.83	
3	1	Sakiko Shimizu (JPN)	4:45.88	
4	1	Nguyễn Thị Ánh Viên (VIE)	4:47.56	
5	2	Kim Seo-yeong (KOR)	4:48.59	
6	1	Yang Chang (CHN)	4:53.56	
7	1	Azzahra Permatahani (INA)	4:53.58	
8	2	Lam Hoi Kiu (HKG)	4:58.54	
9	2	Mai Thị Linh (VIE)	5:03.65	
10	1	Karen Liu (HKG)	5:04.00	
11	1	Elizaveta Rogozhnikova (KGZ)	5:12.47	
—	2	Ressa Kania Dewi (INA)	DNS	

=== Final ===
Rank	Athlete	Time	Notes
1st place, gold medalist(s)	Yui Ohashi (JPN)	4:34.58	
2nd place, silver medalist(s)	Kim Seo-yeong (KOR)	4:37.43	
3rd place, bronze medalist(s)	Sakiko Shimizu (JPN)	4:39.10	
4	Zhou Min (CHN)	4:42.75	
5	Nguyễn Thị Ánh Viên (VIE)	4:42.81	
6	Yang Chang (CHN)	4:47.24	
7	Lam Hoi Kiu (HKG)	4:55.42	
8	Azzahra Permatahani (INA)	4:58.89	
