= Swimming at the 2014 Asian Games – Women's 400 metre individual medley =

Women's 400 metre individual medley at the 2014 Asian Games
- Venue: Munhak Park Tae-hwan Aquatics Center
- Date: 23 September 2014
- Competitors: 11 from 8 nations

Medalists
gold medal	Ye Shiwen	China
silver medal	Sakiko Shimizu	Japan
bronze medal	Nguyễn Thị Ánh Viên	Vietnam

The women's 400 metre individual medley event at the 2014 Asian Games took place on 23 September 2014 at Munhak Park Tae-hwan Aquatics Center.

== Schedule ==
All times are Korea Standard Time (UTC+09:00)

Date	Time	Event
Tuesday, 23 September 2014	09:00	Heats
Tuesday, 23 September 2014	19:24	Final

== Records ==
Prior to this competition, the existing world, Asian and Games records were as follows.

World Record	Ye Shiwen (CHN)	4:28.43	London, United Kingdom	28 July 2012
Asian Record	Ye Shiwen (CHN)	4:28.43	London, United Kingdom	28 July 2012
Games Record	Ye Shiwen (CHN)	4:33.79	Guangzhou, China	14 November 2010

== Results ==
=== Heats ===
Rank	Heat	Athlete	Time	Notes
1	2	Ye Shiwen (CHN)	4:38.21	
2	1	Sakiko Shimizu (JPN)	4:40.49	
3	1	Kim Seo-yeong (KOR)	4:44.27	
4	1	Nam Yoo-sun (KOR)	4:45.82	
5	2	Zhou Min (CHN)	4:46.12	
6	1	Miho Takahashi (JPN)	4:46.58	
7	2	Nguyễn Thị Ánh Viên (VIE)	4:46.77	
8	2	Ranohon Amanova (UZB)	4:50.74	
9	2	Sarisa Suwannachet (THA)	4:58.30	
10	1	Tan Jing E (SIN)	5:05.62	
11	2	Gabriella Doueihy (LIB)	5:32.27	

=== Final ===
Rank	Athlete	Time	Notes
1st place, gold medalist(s)	Ye Shiwen (CHN)	4:32.97	GR
2nd place, silver medalist(s)	Sakiko Shimizu (JPN)	4:38.63	
3rd place, bronze medalist(s)	Nguyễn Thị Ánh Viên (VIE)	4:39.65	
4	Kim Seo-yeong (KOR)	4:42.92	
5	Miho Takahashi (JPN)	4:43.61	
6	Zhou Min (CHN)	4:44.49	
7	Nam Yoo-sun (KOR)	4:44.61	
8	Ranohon Amanova (UZB)	4:48.99	
