= Swimming at the 2015 World Aquatics Championships – Women's 400 metre individual medley =

Women's 400 metre individual medley at the 2015 World Aquatics Championships
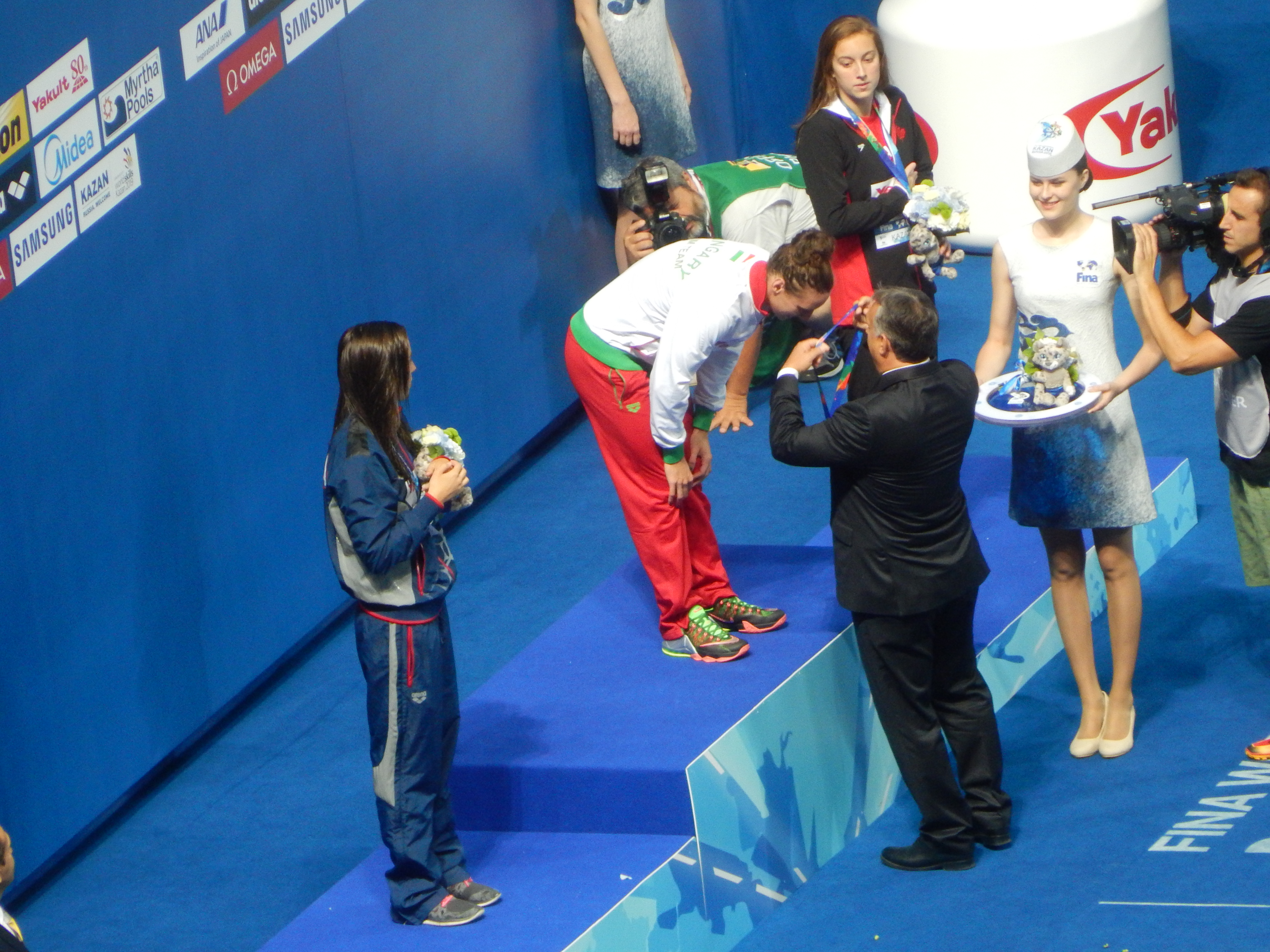
- Victory Ceremony
- Dates: 9 August (heats and final)
- Competitors: 35 from 27 nations
- Winning time: 4:30.39

Medalists
gold medal	Katinka Hosszú	Hungary
silver medal	Maya DiRado	United States
bronze medal	Emily Overholt	Canada

The Women's 400 metre individual medley competition of the swimming events at the 2015 World Aquatics Championships was held on 9 August with the heats and the final.

== Records ==
Prior to the competition, the existing world and championship records were as follows.

World record	Ye Shiwen (CHN)	4:28.43	London, Great Britain	28 July 2012
Competition record	Katinka Hosszú (HUN)	4:30.31	Rome, Italy	26 July 2009

== Results ==
=== Heats ===
The heats were held at 10:00.

Rank	Heat	Lane	Name	Nationality	Time	Notes
1	4	4	Katinka Hosszú	Hungary	4:32.78	Q
2	4	7	Barbora Závadová	Czech Republic	4:35.60	Q, NR
3	4	8	Emily Overholt	Canada	4:35.86	Q
4	3	4	Hannah Miley	Great Britain	4:36.11	Q
4	3	3	Maya DiRado	United States	4:36.11	Q
6	4	6	Sakiko Shimizu	Japan	4:36.16	Q
7	4	3	Aimee Willmott	Great Britain	4:36.82	Q
8	3	2	Lara Grangeon	France	4:38.20	Q
9	3	0	Anja Klinar	Slovenia	4:38.39	
10	3	8	Nguyễn Thị Ánh Viên	Vietnam	4:38.78	NR
11	4	2	Zsuzsanna Jakabos	Hungary	4:38.94	
12	4	5	Elizabeth Beisel	United States	4:38.96	
13	3	6	Keryn McMaster	Australia	4:39.05	
14	3	1	Sydney Pickrem	Canada	4:40.60	
15	3	5	Ye Shiwen	China	4:42.96	
16	2	3	Chihiro Igarashi	Japan	4:43.06	
17	2	5	Franziska Hentke	Germany	4:43.51	
18	2	4	Nam Yoo-sun	South Korea	4:43.83	
19	3	7	Joanna Maranhão	Brazil	4:44.40	
20	4	0	Beatriz Gómez Cortés	Spain	4:44.51	
21	4	1	Tessa Wallace	Australia	4:44.93	
22	2	2	Jördis Steinegger	Austria	4:45.50	
23	3	9	Fantine Lesaffre	France	4:46.06	
24	2	8	Ranohon Amanova	Uzbekistan	4:47.85	
25	4	9	Stina Gardell	Sweden	4:48.65	
26	2	1	Anja Crevar	Serbia	4:50.04	
27	2	6	Zhou Min	China	4:50.36	
28	2	0	Virginia Bardach	Argentina	4:51.59	
29	2	9	Martina van Berkel	Switzerland	4:51.79	
30	1	4	Phiangkhwan Pawapotako	Thailand	4:53.15	
31	2	7	Victoria Kaminskaya	Portugal	4:53.47	
32	1	5	Gizem Bozkurt	Turkey	4:56.39	
33	1	6	Maria Far Nuñez	Panama	5:05.55	
34	1	3	Georgina González	Mexico	5:05.62	
35	1	2	Rebeca Quinteros	El Salvador	5:17.71	

=== Final ===
The final was held at 18:49.

Rank	Lane	Name	Nationality	Time	Notes
1st place, gold medalist(s)	4	Katinka Hosszú	Hungary	4:30.39	
2nd place, silver medalist(s)	2	Maya DiRado	United States	4:31.71	
3rd place, bronze medalist(s)	3	Emily Overholt	Canada	4:32.52	NR
4	6	Hannah Miley	Great Britain	4:34.79	
5	5	Barbora Závadová	Czech Republic	4:36.73	
6	7	Sakiko Shimizu	Japan	4:37.19	
7	1	Aimee Willmott	Great Britain	4:38.75	
8	8	Lara Grangeon	France	4:40.98	
