= Swimming at the 2022 Asian Games – Women's 200 metre individual medley =

Women's 200 metre individual medley at the 2022 Asian Games
- Venue: Hangzhou Olympic Expo Aquatics Center
- Date: 25 September 2023
- Competitors: 21 from 15 nations

Medalists
gold medal	Yu Yiting	China
silver medal	Ye Shiwen	China
bronze medal	Kim Seo-yeong	South Korea

The women's 200 metre individual medley event at the 2022 Asian Games took place on 25 September 2023 at the Hangzhou Olympic Expo Center.

== Schedule ==
All times are China Standard Time (UTC+08:00)

Date	Time	Event
Monday, 25 September 2023	11:05	Heats
Monday, 25 September 2023	20:28	Final

== Records ==
Prior to this competition, the existing world, Asian and Games records were as follows.

World Record	Katinka Hosszú (HUN)	2:06.12	Kazan, Russia	3 August 2015
Asian Record	Ye Shiwen (CHN)	2:07.57	London, United Kingdom	31 July 2012
Games Record	Kim Seo-yeong (KOR)	2:08.34	Jakarta, Indonesia	24 August 2018

== Results ==
Legend

- DSQ — Disqualified

=== Heats ===
Rank	Heat	Athlete	Time	Notes
1	2	Mio Narita (JPN)	2:13.93	
2	3	Yu Yiting (CHN)	2:14.02	
3	3	Ye Shiwen (CHN)	2:14.56	
4	1	Letitia Sim (SGP)	2:15.59	
5	1	Yui Ohashi (JPN)	2:15.66	
6	2	Kamonchanok Kwanmuang (THA)	2:16.23	
7	2	Kim Seo-yeong (KOR)	2:16.27	
8	1	Xiandi Chua (PHI)	2:16.43	
9	3	Chloe Cheng (HKG)	2:19.09	
10	1	Xeniya Ignatova (KAZ)	2:19.13	
11	3	Jinjutha Pholjamjumrus (THA)	2:19.95	
11	3	Ng Lai Wa (HKG)	2:19.99	
13	2	Chloe Isleta (PHI)	2:20.54	
14	1	Valerie Tarazi (PLE)	2:20.57	
15	3	Cheang Weng Chi (MAC)	2:26.46	
16	2	Hashika Ramachandra (IND)	2:28.29	
17	1	Elizaveta Rogozhnikova (KGZ)	2:31.69	
18	1	Jehanara Nabi (PAK)	2:34.18	
19	2	Temüüjingiin Anungoo (MGL)	2:41.93	
20	2	Enkhbaataryn Anima (MGL)	2:44.70	
—	3	Meral Ayn Latheef (MDV)	DSQ	

=== Final ===
Rank	Athlete	Time	Notes
1st place, gold medalist(s)	Yu Yiting (CHN)	2:07.75	GR
2nd place, silver medalist(s)	Ye Shiwen (CHN)	2:10.34	
3rd place, bronze medalist(s)	Kim Seo-yeong (KOR)	2:10.36	
4	Mio Narita (JPN)	2:10.76	
5	Kamonchanok Kwanmuang (THA)	2:14.79	
6	Yui Ohashi (JPN)	2:15.01	
7	Letitia Sim (SGP)	2:15.51	
8	Xiandi Chua (PHI)	2:16.18	
