= Swimming at the 2020 Summer Olympics – Women's 200 metre individual medley =

Women's 200 metre individual medley at the Games of the XXXII Olympiad
- Venue: Tokyo Aquatics Centre
- Dates: 26 July 2021 (heats); 27 July 2021 (semifinals); 28 July 2021 (final)
- Competitors: 27 from 20 nations
- Winning time: 2:08.52

Medalists
1st place, gold medalist(s)		Yui Ohashi	Japan
2nd place, silver medalist(s)		Alex Walsh	United States
3rd place, bronze medalist(s)		Kate Douglass	United States

The women's 200 metre individual medley event at the 2020 Summer Olympics was held from 26 to 28 July 2021 at the Tokyo Aquatics Centre. It will be the event's twelfth appearance, having been first held in 1968 and 1972 and then at every edition since 1984.

== Summary ==
Japan's home favourite Yui Ohashi pulled away from a tight field to strike a medley double for the seventh straight Olympics, having already won gold in the 400 m race. Second at the final turn behind the U.S.' Alex Walsh, Ohashi narrowly eclipsed the American to win gold in 2:08.52. While leading at the 150, Walsh faded over the closing stages to claim silver in a personal best time of 2:08.65. Walsh's teammate Kate Douglass moved through the field in the breaststroke, before charging home in the freestyle leg to take the bronze in 2:09.04. Third at the final turn, Great Britain's Abbie Wood could not hold off Douglass at the finish and settled for fourth 11 hundredths of a second back in 2:09.15.

China's Yu Yiting, the early leader after the butterfly and backstroke legs, fell of the pace to come fifth in a world junior record of 2:09.57. Canada's 2019 World Championships bronze medallist Sydney Pickrem repeated her sixth-place finish from Rio five years earlier, touching in 2:10.05. Hungary's defending champion and world record holder Katinka Hosszú was unable to replicate her sterling Rio performance and claimed a distant seventh in 2:12.78. Wood's teammate Alicia Wilson (2:12.86) rounded out the championship field.

The medals for competition were presented by Hungary's Dániel Gyurta, IOC member, and the gifts were presented by Uruguay's Verónica Stanham, FINA Bureau Member.

== Records ==
Prior to this competition, the existing world and Olympic records were as follows.

World record	Katinka Hosszú (HUN)	2:06.12	Kazan, Russia	3 August 2015
Olympic record	Katinka Hosszú (HUN)	2:06.58	Rio de Janeiro, Brazil	9 August 2016

No new records were set during the competition.

== Qualification ==
The Olympic Qualifying Time for the event is 2:12.56. Up to two swimmers per National Olympic Committee (NOC) can automatically qualify by swimming that time at an approved qualification event. The Olympic Selection Time is 2:16.54. Up to one swimmer per NOC meeting that time is eligible for selection, allocated by world ranking until the maximum quota for all swimming events is reached. NOCs without a female swimmer qualified in any event can also use their universality place.

== Competition format ==
The competition consists of three rounds: heats, semifinals, and a final. The swimmers with the best 16 times in the heats advance to the semifinals. The swimmers with the best 8 times in the semifinals advance to the final. Swim-offs are used as necessary to break ties for advancement to the next round.

== Schedule ==
All times are Japan Standard Time (UTC+9)

Date	Time	Round
26 July	19:00	Heats
27 July	11:58	Semifinals
28 July	11:45	Final

== Results ==
=== Heats ===
The swimmers with the top 16 times, regardless of heat, advanced to the semifinals.

Rank	Heat	Lane	Swimmer	Nation	Time	Notes
1	2	5	Kate Douglass	United States	2:09.16	Q
2	4	4	Katinka Hosszú	Hungary	2:09.70	Q
3	3	5	Abbie Wood	Great Britain	2:09.94	Q
3	4	5	Alex Walsh	United States	2:09.94	Q
5	3	2	Maria Ugolkova	Switzerland	2:10.04	Q, NR
6	3	4	Sydney Pickrem	Canada	2:10.13	Q
7	3	6	Anastasia Gorbenko	Israel	2:10.21	Q
8	2	3	Yu Yiting	China	2:10.22	Q
9	3	3	Alicia Wilson	Great Britain	2:10.39	Q
10	2	4	Yui Ohashi	Japan	2:10.77	Q
11	4	7	Cyrielle Duhamel	France	2:11.11	Q
12	4	3	Miho Teramura	Japan	2:11.22	Q
13	2	2	Ilaria Cusinato	Italy	2:11.41	Q
14	4	2	Sara Franceschi	Italy	2:11.47	Q
15	4	6	Kim Seo-yeong	South Korea	2:11.54	Q
16	4	8	Kristýna Horská	Czech Republic	2:12.21	Q
17	2	7	Dalma Sebestyén	Hungary	2:12.42	
18	2	6	Bailey Andison	Canada	2:12.52	
19	4	1	Ellen Walshe	Ireland	2:13.34	
20	3	8	África Zamorano	Spain	2:13.81	
21	3	7	Fantine Lesaffre	France	2:14.20	
22	3	1	Viktoriya Zeynep Güneş	Turkey	2:14.41	
23	2	8	Rebecca Meder	South Africa	2:14.79	
24	1	5	McKenna DeBever	Peru	2:15.86	
25	2	1	Diana Petkova	Bulgaria	2:16.70	
26	1	4	Anja Crevar	Serbia	2:17.62	
27	1	3	Nicole Frank	Uruguay	2:18.93	

=== Semifinals ===
The swimmers with the best 8 times, regardless of heat, advanced to the final.

Rank	Heat	Lane	Swimmer	Nation	Time	Notes
1	2	4	Kate Douglass	United States	2:09.21	Q
2	2	5	Abbie Wood	Great Britain	2:09.56	Q
3	1	5	Alex Walsh	United States	2:09.57	Q
4	1	6	Yu Yiting	China	2:09.72	Q
5	1	2	Yui Ohashi	Japan	2:09.79	Q
6	1	3	Sydney Pickrem	Canada	2:09.94	Q
7	1	4	Katinka Hosszú	Hungary	2:10.22	Q
8	2	2	Alicia Wilson	Great Britain	2:10.59	Q
9	2	3	Maria Ugolkova	Switzerland	2:10.65	
10	2	6	Anastasia Gorbenko	Israel	2:10.70	
11	2	7	Cyrielle Duhamel	France	2:10.84	
12	2	8	Kim Seo-yeong	South Korea	2:11.38	
13	1	1	Sara Franceschi	Italy	2:11.71	
14	2	1	Ilaria Cusinato	Italy	2:12.10	
15	1	7	Miho Teramura	Japan	2:12.14	
16	1	8	Kristýna Horská	Czech Republic	2:12.85	

=== Final ===
Rank	Lane	Swimmer	Nation	Time	Notes
1st place, gold medalist(s)	2	Yui Ohashi	Japan	2:08.52	
2nd place, silver medalist(s)	3	Alex Walsh	United States	2:08.65	
3rd place, bronze medalist(s)	4	Kate Douglass	United States	2:09.04	
4	5	Abbie Wood	Great Britain	2:09.15	
5	6	Yu Yiting	China	2:09.57	WJ
6	7	Sydney Pickrem	Canada	2:10.05	
7	1	Katinka Hosszú	Hungary	2:12.38	
8	8	Alicia Wilson	Great Britain	2:12.86	
