= Swimming at the 2016 Summer Olympics – Women's 400 metre individual medley =

Women's 400 metre individual medley at the Games of the XXXI Olympiad
- Venue: Olympic Aquatics Stadium
- Dates: 6 August 2016
- Competitors: 33 from 23 nations
- Winning time: 4:26.36 WR

Medalists
1st place, gold medalist(s)		Katinka Hosszú	Hungary
2nd place, silver medalist(s)		Maya DiRado	United States
3rd place, bronze medalist(s)		Mireia Belmonte	Spain

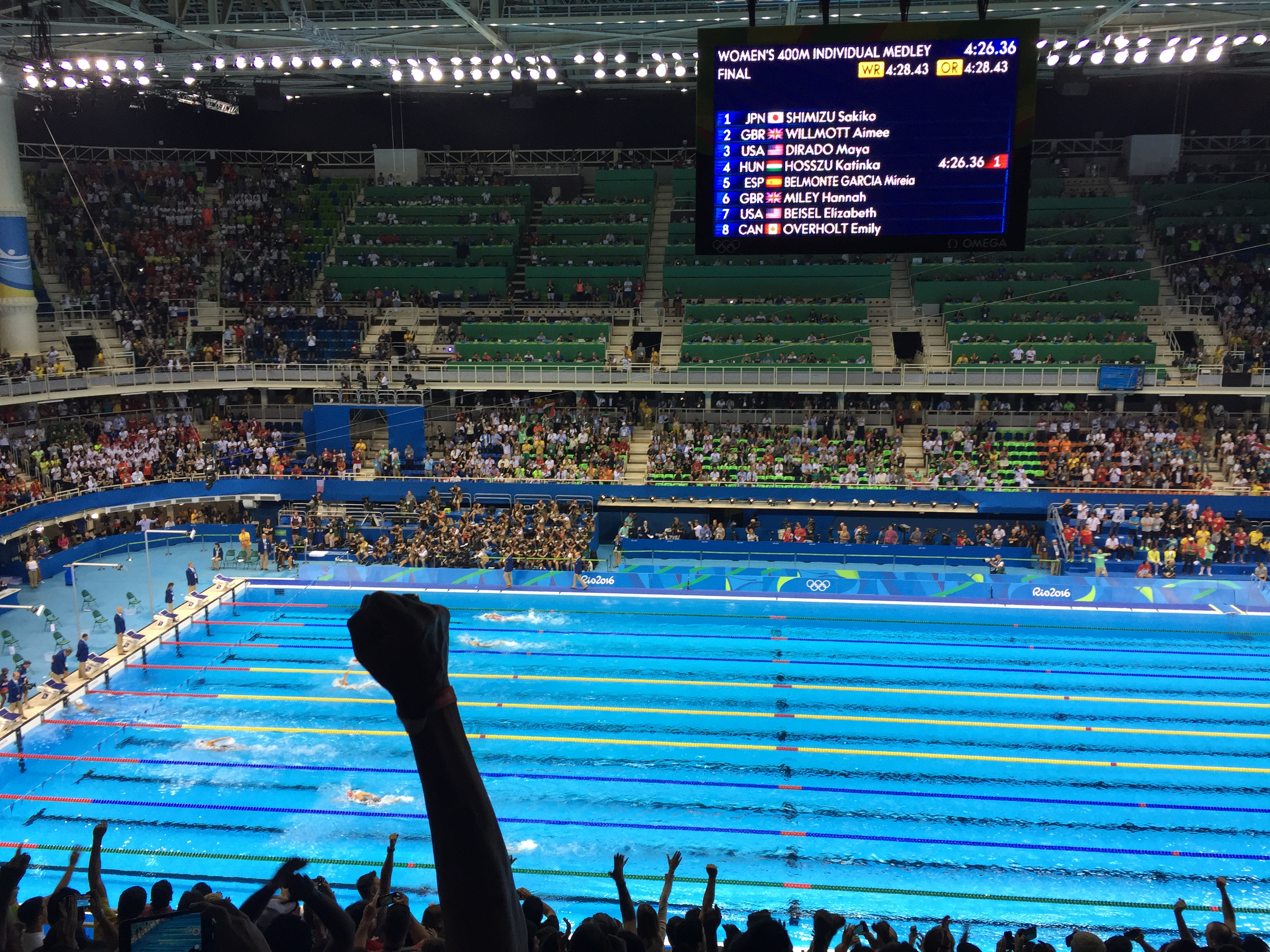
Katinka Hosszú finished the race breaking the world record.

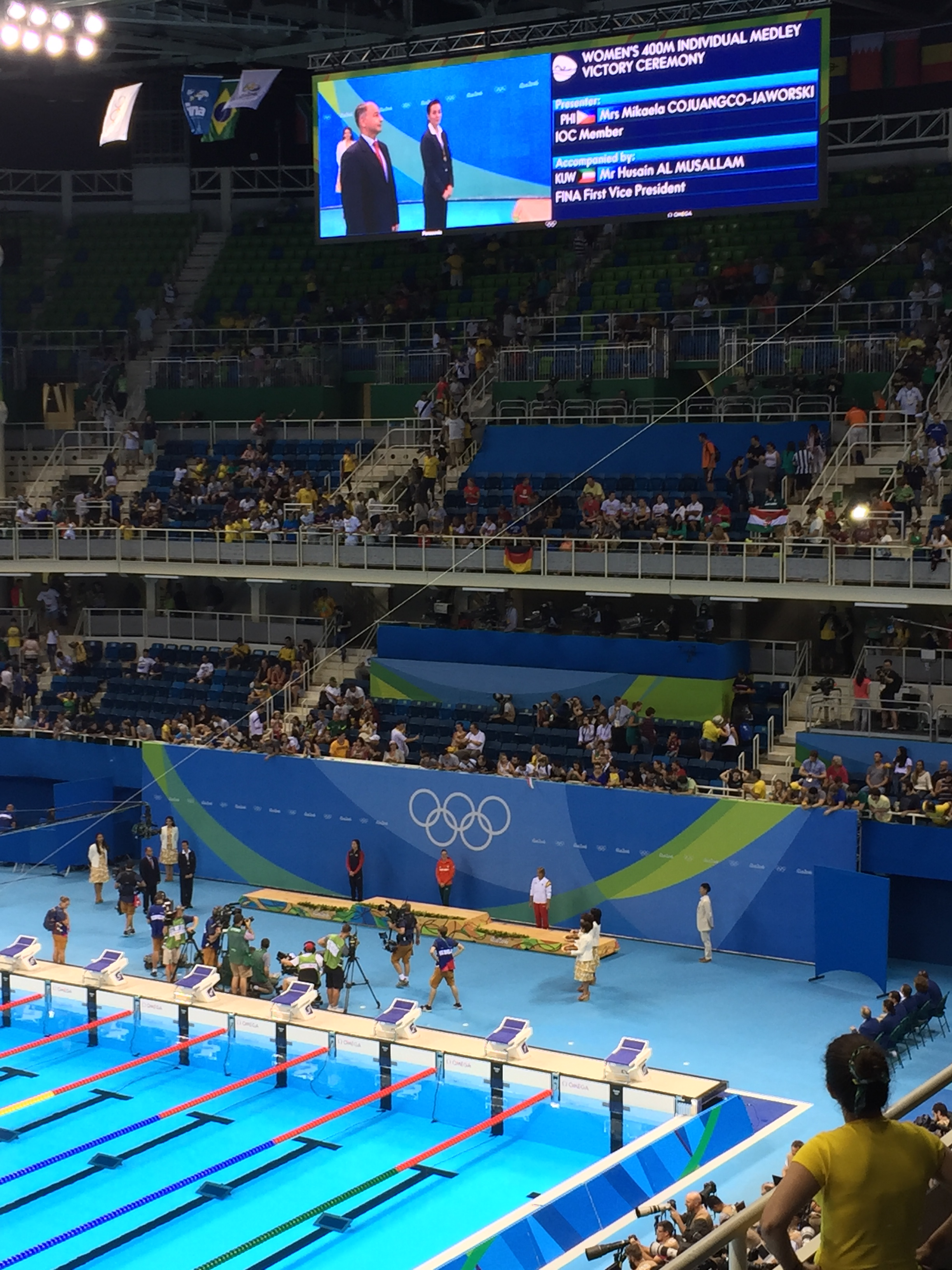
Hosszú, DiRado and Belmont wait for their medals.

The women's 400 metre individual medley event at the 2016 Summer Olympics took place on 6 August at the Olympic Aquatics Stadium.

== Summary ==
Four years after narrowly missing the podium in London, Hungary's Katinka Hosszú, nicknamed the "Iron Lady", opened her redemptive Games by dominating the 400 m individual medley with a new world record and the first title of her Olympic career. Dominating the race from the very start, she pulled away from the field to a gold-medal finish with a 4:26.36. Hosszú's swim also demolished the world record of 4:28.43, set by China's Ye Shiwen at the previous Games. Trailing the leader by almost five seconds, U.S. swimmer Maya DiRado turned ahead of the world-record pace for over half the race, and managed to finish with a silver in 4:31.15. Meanwhile, Spain's Mireia Belmonte rounded out the podium with a bronze in 4:32.39, edging out Great Britain's Hannah Miley (4:32.54) in a tight battle to fourth by 0.15 of a second.

Canada's Emily Overholt finished fifth with a 4:34.70, and was shortly followed by London 2012 runner-up Elizabeth Beisel of the United States (4:34.98). Miley's teammate Aimee Willmott (4:35.04) and Japan's Sakiko Shimizu (4:38.06) rounded out the final.

Reigning Olympic champion Ye Shiwen missed a chance to defend her title in the final, after finishing twenty-seventh out of thirty-three swimmers in the prelims.

The medals for the competition were presented by Mikee Cojuangco-Jaworski, Philippines, IOC member, and the gifts were presented by Husain al-Musallam, First Vice President of the FINA.

== Records ==
Prior to this competition, the existing world and Olympic records were as follows.

World record	Ye Shiwen (CHN)	4:28.43	London, United Kingdom	28 July 2012
Olympic record	Ye Shiwen (CHN)	4:28.43	London, United Kingdom	28 July 2012

The following records were established during the competition:

Date	Event	Name	Nationality	Time	Record
6 August	Final	Katinka Hosszú	Hungary	4:26.36	WR

== Competition format ==
The competition consisted of two rounds: heats and a final. The swimmers with the best 8 times in the heats advanced to the final. Swim-offs were used as necessary to break ties for advancement to the next round.

== Results ==
=== Heats ===
Rank	Heat	Lane	Name	Nationality	Time	Notes
1	5	4	Katinka Hosszú	Hungary	4:28.58	Q, ER
2	5	3	Mireia Belmonte	Spain	4:32.75	Q
3	4	4	Maya DiRado	United States	4:33.50	Q
4	5	5	Hannah Miley	Great Britain	4:33.74	Q
5	4	3	Aimee Willmott	Great Britain	4:34.08	Q
6	5	2	Elizabeth Beisel	United States	4:34.38	Q
7	5	7	Sakiko Shimizu	Japan	4:34.66	Q, NR
8	4	5	Emily Overholt	Canada	4:36.54	Q
9	3	2	Nguyễn Thị Ánh Viên	Vietnam	4:36.85	NR
10	4	6	Miho Takahashi	Japan	4:37.33	
10	4	8	Keryn McMaster	Australia	4:37.33	
12	3	4	Sydney Pickrem	Canada	4:38.06	
13	5	8	Zsuzsanna Jakabos	Hungary	4:38.52	
14	4	2	Barbora Závadová	Czech Republic	4:38.53	
15	3	5	Joanna Maranhão	Brazil	4:38.88	
16	5	6	Blair Evans	Australia	4:38.91	
17	2	7	Matea Samardžić	Croatia	4:39.41	
18	3	8	Viktoriya Zeynep Güneş	Turkey	4:41.79	
19	3	7	María Vilas	Spain	4:42.52	
20	2	2	Anja Crevar	Serbia	4:43.19	
21	3	6	Franziska Hentke	Germany	4:43.32	
22	5	1	Lara Grangeon	France	4:43.98	
23	3	1	Fantine Lesaffre	France	4:44.47	
24	1	5	Martina van Berkel	Switzerland	4:45.12	
25	1	3	Tanja Kylliäinen	Finland	4:45.33	NR
26	3	3	Luisa Trombetti	Italy	4:45.52	
27	4	7	Ye Shiwen	China	4:45.86	
28	2	3	Victoria Kaminskaya	Portugal	4:46.03	
29	1	4	Jördis Steinegger	Austria	4:47.84	
30	2	4	Sara Franceschi	Italy	4:48.48	
31	2	6	Virginia Bardach	Argentina	4:49.69	
32	4	1	Zhou Min	China	4:50.38	
33	2	5	Ranohon Amanova	Uzbekistan	4:52.15	

=== Final ===
Rank	Lane	Name	Nationality	Time	Notes
1st place, gold medalist(s)	4	Katinka Hosszú	Hungary	4:26.36	WR
2nd place, silver medalist(s)	3	Maya DiRado	United States	4:31.15	
3rd place, bronze medalist(s)	5	Mireia Belmonte	Spain	4:32.39	
4	6	Hannah Miley	Great Britain	4:32.54	
5	8	Emily Overholt	Canada	4:34.70	
6	7	Elizabeth Beisel	United States	4:34.98	
7	2	Aimee Willmott	Great Britain	4:35.04	
8	1	Sakiko Shimizu	Japan	4:38.06	
