= 2016 FINA World Swimming Championships (25 m) – Women's 400 metre individual medley =

Women's 400 metre individual medley at the 2016 FINA World Swimming Championships (25 m)
- Venue: WFCU Centre
- Dates: 6 December (heats and final)
- Competitors: 24 from 18 nations
- Winning time: 4:21.67

Medalists
gold medal	Katinka Hosszú	Hungary
silver medal	Ella Eastin	United States
bronze medal	Madisyn Cox	United States

The Women's 400 metre individual medley competition of the 2016 FINA World Swimming Championships (25 m) was held on 7 December 2016.

== Records ==
Prior to the competition, the existing world and championship records were as follows.

	Name	Nation	Time	Location	Date
World record	Katinka Hosszú	Hungary	4:19.46	Netanya	2 December 2015
Championship record	Mireia Belmonte	Spain	4:19.86	Doha	3 December 2014

== Results ==
=== Heats ===
The heats were held at 11:49.

Rank	Heat	Lane	Name	Nationality	Time	Notes
1	3	4	Katinka Hosszú	Hungary	4:25.03	Q
2	2	2	Ella Eastin	United States	4:29.64	Q
3	3	2	Mireia Belmonte	Spain	4:31.14	Q
4	2	4	Hannah Miley	Great Britain	4:31.48	Q
5	3	3	Barbora Závadová	Czech Republic	4:32.06	Q
6	1	6	Nguyễn Thị Ánh Viên	Vietnam	4:32.19	Q, NR
7	3	5	Yui Ohashi	Japan	4:32.20	Q
8	3	6	Madisyn Cox	United States	4:34.50	Q
9	2	3	Abbie Wood	Great Britain	4:34.78	
10	2	7	Sarah Darcel	Canada	4:35.66	
11	2	6	Wakaba Tsuyuuchi	Japan	4:37.66	
12	3	7	Fantine Lesaffre	France	4:38.18	
13	2	5	Li Bingjie	China	4:40.03	
14	2	0	Maxine Wolters	Germany	4:40.77	
15	3	1	Victoria Kaminskaya	Portugal	4:42.62	
16	3	0	Martina van Berkel	Switzerland	4:43.43	
17	1	3	Ajna Késely	Hungary	4:44.40	
18	3	8	Florencia Perotti	Argentina	4:45.61	
19	2	8	Phiangkhwan Pawapotako	Thailand	4:45.71	NR
20	2	1	Kristýna Horská	Czech Republic	4:47.22	
21	2	9	Hamida Rania Nefsi	Algeria	4:49.68	
22	3	9	Souad Nefissa Cherouati	Algeria	4:57.37	
23	1	4	Alania Suttie	Samoa	5:09.44	NR
24	1	5	Cecilia Medina	Honduras	5:38.87	

=== Final ===
The final was held at 19:18.

Rank	Lane	Name	Nationality	Time	Notes
1st place, gold medalist(s)	4	Katinka Hosszú	Hungary	4:21.67	
2nd place, silver medalist(s)	5	Ella Eastin	United States	4:27.74	
3rd place, bronze medalist(s)	8	Madisyn Cox	United States	4:27.78	
4	6	Hannah Miley	Great Britain	4:27.86	
5	3	Mireia Belmonte	Spain	4:32.98	
6	1	Yui Ohashi	Japan	4:33.07	
7	2	Barbora Závadová	Czech Republic	4:37.79	
	7	Nguyễn Thị Ánh Viên	Vietnam		DSQ
