= Madisyn Cox =

American swimmer (born 1995)

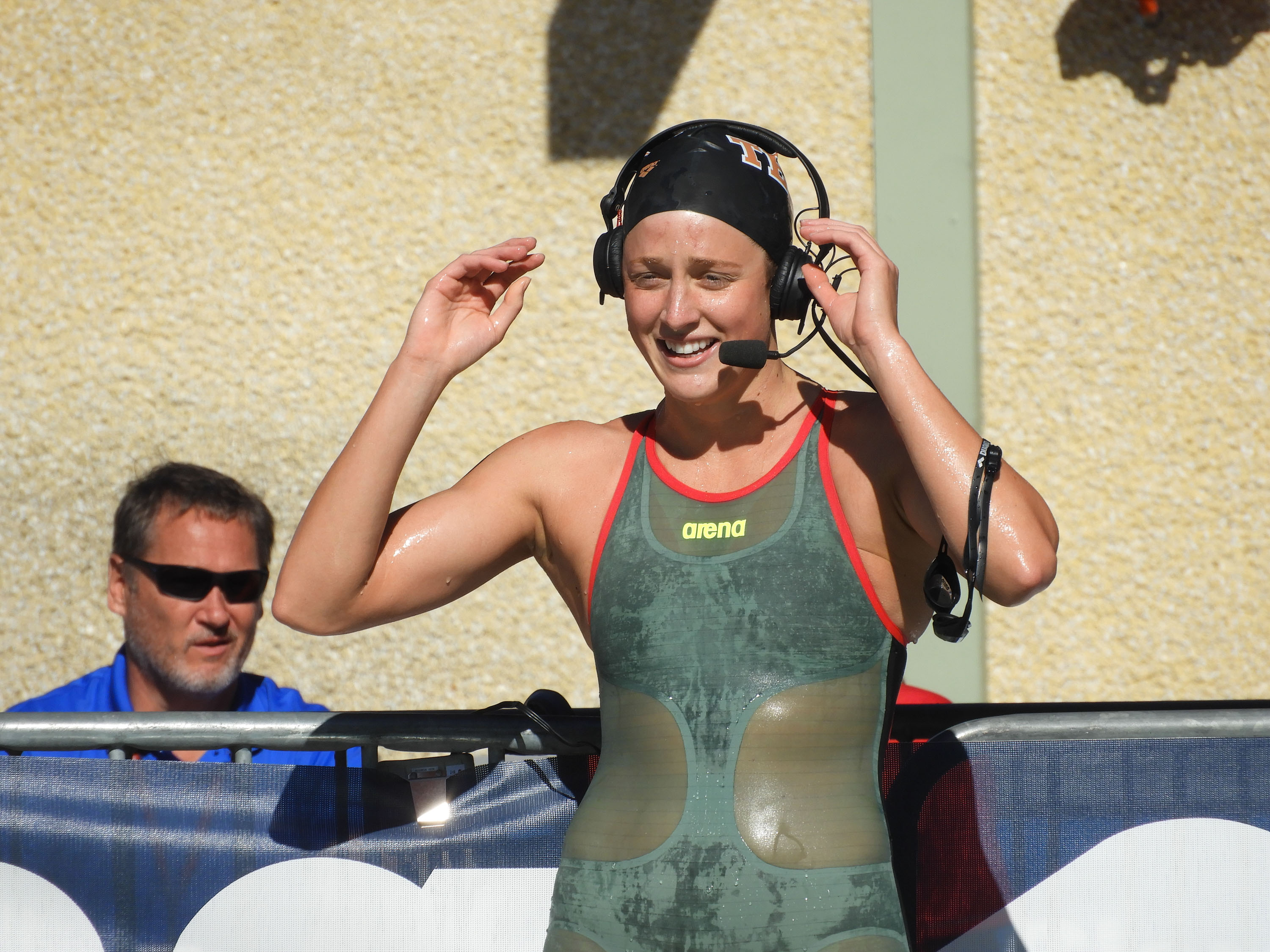

Personal information
- National team: United States
- Born: May 30, 1995 (age 31) Lubbock, Texas, U.S.
- Height: 5 ft 10 in (177.8 cm)

Sport
- Sport: Swimming
- Strokes: Individual medley
- College team: University of Texas
Medal record
Women's swimming
Representing the United States
World Championships (LC)
Gold medal – first place	2017 Budapest	4×200 m freestyle
Bronze medal – third place	2017 Budapest	200 m medley
World Championships (SC)
Silver medal – second place	2016 Windsor	4x200 m freestyle
Bronze medal – third place	2016 Windsor	200 m medley
Bronze medal – third place	2016 Windsor	400 m medley

Madisyn Cox (born May 30, 1995) is an American former swimmer specializing in individual medley events.

== College career ==
For the Texas Longhorns she was named the 2015 and 2017 Big 12 Conference Swimmer of the Year. She is a 10-time All-American.

== International career ==
=== 2014 ===
She competed in the 4 × 200-meter freestyle relay at the Short Course World Championships.

=== 2015 ===
Cox took silver in the 200-meter individual medley at the 2015 Summer Universiade.

=== 2016 ===
She won bronze in the 400-meter individual medley at the 2016 Short Course World Championships. She had originally finished 4th, but was elevated to bronze, along with teammate Ella Eastin being elevated to silver, when Ánh Viên Nguyễn was disqualified from second place.

=== 2017 ===
Cox qualified to swim the 200-meter individual medley at the World Championships after finishing second at the 2017 US Nationals. She went on to win the bronze medal in Budapest with a time of 2:09.71. She also won a gold medal as a prelim swimmer in the 4x200 freestyle relay.

=== 2018 ===
Cox was banned from competition for six months after a urine sample taken in February 2018 tested positive for trimetazidine. FINA initially reduced her suspension from four years to two years because of Cox's testimony that she did not knowingly ingest the performance-enhancing drug, but would not reduce it further without evidence of the source of the trimetazidine. Upon analysis of both opened and sealed bottles of Cooper Complete Elite Athletic multivitamins, the Court of Arbitration for Sport determined that the multivitamins were the source, and reduced Cox's suspension to six months. The suspension expired on September 3, 2018. However, as the United States Swimming World Championship trials occurred during her suspension, Cox was not able to qualify for the 2019 World Aquatics Championships.

=== 2021 ===
At the 2021 U.S. Olympic Swimming Trials, Cox finished third in the 200 meter individual medley, touching in 2:09.34, missing the Olympic team by 0.02 seconds. Cox retired from swimming after the trials to begin medical school at the University of Texas.
