= Swimming at the 2016 European Aquatics Championships – Women's 200 metre backstroke =

Women's 200 metre backstroke at the 2016 European Aquatics Championships
- Dates: 16–17 May
- Competitors: 34 from 24 nations
- Winning time: 2:07.01

Medalists
gold medal	Katinka Hosszú	Hungary
silver medal	Daryna Zevina	Ukraine
bronze medal	Matea Samardžić	Croatia

The Women's 200 metre backstroke competition of the 2016 European Aquatics Championships was held on 16 and 17 May 2016.

== Records ==
Prior to the competition, the existing world, European and championship records were as follows.

	Name	Nation	Time	Location	Date
World record	Missy Franklin	United States	2:04.06	London	28 July 2012
European record	Anastasia Zuyeva	Russia	2:04.94	Rome	1 August 2009
Championship record	Krisztina Egerszegi	Hungary	2:06.62	Athens	22 August 1991

== Results ==
The heats were held on 16 May at 11:28.

=== Heats ===
Rank	Heat	Lane	Name	Nationality	Time	Notes
1	4	4	Katinka Hosszú	Hungary	2:08.44	Q
2	2	5	Daryna Zevina	Ukraine	2:09.90	Q
3	3	8	Ekaterina Avramova	Turkey	2:11.21	Q
4	3	5	Matea Samardžić	Croatia	2:11.25	Q
5	3	4	Eygló Ósk Gústafsdóttir	Iceland	2:11.30	Q
6	4	5	Margherita Panziera	Italy	2:11.45	Q
7	2	3	Simona Baumrtová	Czech Republic	2:11.53	Q
8	4	6	Kata Burián	Hungary	2:11.92	Q
9	3	6	Réka György	Hungary	2:12.24	
10	3	3	Alicja Tchórz	Poland	2:12.87	
11	2	2	Zülal Zeren	Turkey	2:12.99	Q
12	4	3	Africa Zamorano	Spain	2:13.03	Q
13	4	7	Kathleen Dawson	Great Britain	2:13.24	Q
14	4	2	Charlotte Evans	Great Britain	2:13.35	Q
14	3	7	Ugnė Mažutaitytė	Lithuania	2:13.35	Q
16	2	6	Maxine Wolters	Germany	2:13.57	Q
17	2	4	Irina Prikhodko	Russia	2:13.77	Q
18	2	1	Henriette Stenkvist	Sweden	2:15.26	
19	1	5	Věra Kopřivová	Czech Republic	2:15.40	
20	3	2	Camille Gheorghiu	France	2:15.90	
21	2	7	Martina van Berkel	Switzerland	2:15.97	
22	3	0	Karolína Hájková	Slovakia	2:16.26	
23	4	9	Alina Kendzior	Estonia	2:16.58	
24	2	8	Karin Tomečková	Slovakia	2:16.67	
25	4	0	Tereza Grusová	Czech Republic	2:16.75	
26	4	1	Tatiana Salcutan	Moldova	2:17.59	
27	2	0	Francisca Azevedo	Portugal	2:19.31	
28	3	1	Jördis Steinegger	Austria	2:20.33	
29	4	8	Ludwika Szynal	Poland	2:20.61	
30	1	4	Danielle Hill	Ireland	2:21.55	
31	1	3	Signhild Joensen	Faroe Islands	2:21.58	
32	3	9	Kätlin Sepp	Estonia	2:22.67	
33	1	6	Eline van den Bossche	Luxembourg	2:23.65	
34	2	9	Tatiana Perstniova	Moldova	2:25.11	

=== Semifinals ===
The semifinals were held on 16 May at 18:52.

==== Semifinal 1 ====
Rank	Lane	Name	Nationality	Time	Notes
1	4	Daryna Zevina	Ukraine	2:08.66	Q
2	5	Matea Samardžić	Croatia	2:09.87	Q
3	6	Kata Burián	Hungary	2:10.83	Q
4	2	Zülal Zeren	Turkey	2:11.71	Q
5	3	Margherita Panziera	Italy	2:11.80	
6	7	Kathleen Dawson	Great Britain	2:11.81	
7	8	Irina Prikhodko	Russia	2:12.05	
8	1	Charlotte Evans	Great Britain	2:13.15	

==== Semifinal 2 ====
Rank	Lane	Name	Nationality	Time	Notes
1	4	Katinka Hosszú	Hungary	2:09.98	Q
2	3	Eygló Ósk Gústafsdóttir	Iceland	2:10.87	Q
3	6	Simona Baumrtová	Czech Republic	2:11.26	Q
4	2	Alicja Tchórz	Poland	2:11.63	Q
5	7	Africa Zamorano	Spain	2:11.96	
6	5	Ekaterina Avramova	Turkey	2:12.11	
7	8	Maxine Wolters	Germany	2:12.55	
8	1	Ugnė Mažutaitytė	Lithuania	2:13.25	

=== Final ===
The final was held on 17 May at 19:09.

Rank	Lane	Name	Nationality	Time	Notes
1st place, gold medalist(s)	3	Katinka Hosszú	Hungary	2:07.01	
2nd place, silver medalist(s)	4	Daryna Zevina	Ukraine	2:07.48	
3rd place, bronze medalist(s)	5	Matea Samardžić	Croatia	2:09.24	
4	6	Kata Burián	Hungary	2:10.17	
5	7	Simona Baumrtová	Czech Republic	2:10.57	
6	2	Eygló Ósk Gústafsdóttir	Iceland	2:11.03	
7	8	Zülal Zeren	Turkey	2:11.91	
8	1	Alicja Tchórz	Poland	2:13.48	
