= Melanie Margalis =

American swimmer (born 1991)

Personal information
- Full name: Melanie Ann Margalis-Fink
- National team: United States
- Born: Melanie Ann Margalis; December 30, 1991 (age 34) Clearwater, Florida, U.S.
- Height: 173 cm (5 ft 8 in)
- Weight: 65 kg (143 lb)
- Spouse: Nick Fink
- Relative: Robert Margalis (brother)

Sport
- Sport: Swimming
- Strokes: Individual medley, Freestyle, Breaststroke
- Club: Saint Petersburg Aquatics; Cali Condors
- College team: University of Georgia
- Coach: Fred Lewis (St. Petersburg Aquatics); Jack Bauerle (U. Georgia)
Medal record
Women's swimming
Representing the United States
Olympic Games
Gold medal – first place	2016 Rio de Janeiro	4×200 m freestyle
World Championships (LC)
Gold medal – first place	2017 Budapest	4×200 m freestyle
Gold medal – first place	2019 Gwangju	4×100 m medley
Silver medal – second place	2019 Gwangju	4×200 m freestyle
World Championships (SC)
Gold medal – first place	2018 Hangzhou	4×100 m medley
Silver medal – second place	2018 Hangzhou	200 m medley
Silver medal – second place	2018 Hangzhou	400 m medley
Silver medal – second place	2018 Hangzhou	4×200 m freestyle
Silver medal – second place	2021 Abu Dhabi	4×200 m freestyle
Bronze medal – third place	2014 Doha	200 m medley
Bronze medal – third place	2021 Abu Dhabi	400 m medley
Pan Pacific Championships
Silver medal – second place	2018 Tokyo	400 m medley
Summer Universiade
Gold medal – first place	2013 Kazan	4×200 m freestyle
Bronze medal – third place	2013 Kazan	200 m medley
U.S. Open
Gold medal – first place	2019 Atlanta	200 m medley
Gold medal – first place	2019 Atlanta	400 m medley

Melanie Ann Margalis-Fink (née Margalis; born December 30, 1991) is an American competitive swimmer who competed for the University of Georgia and specialized in the freestyle, breaststroke and individual medley events. Margalis represented the Cali Condors which was part of the International Swimming League. She won a gold medal at the 2016 Rio de Janeiro Olympics in the Women's 4×200-meter freestyle relay.

== Career ==
=== High school career ===
Margalis graduated from Countryside High School, where she was also a club swimmer for Saint Petersburg Aquatics. There, she was coached by Fred Lewis. In high school swimming, she was a three-time state champion and held the state record in the 200-yard IM. For four years in a row, Margalis was named her teams’ MVP. Proving her versatility, she also swam the 500-yard free in 2009 in which she also won a state championship. After her performances that season, she was named the 2009-2010 Pinellas County Female Athlete of the Year. That same year, she was named to the National Youth Championship Team.

=== College career ===
Margalis competed for the Georgia Bulldogs swimming and diving women's team at the University of Georgia. The Bulldog women's swimmers won the NCAA Division I women's team title in 2013 and again in 2014.

=== 2013 ===
Margalis won gold in the 4x200-meter freestyle relay as a member of the preliminary team and bronze in the 200-meter individual medley at the 2013 World University Games in Kazan, Russia.

=== 2014 ===
At the 2014 National Championships, Margalis won the 200-meter IM and finished third in both the 400-meter IM and 200-meter breaststroke to earn a roster spot on the Pan Pac team — she finished 12th in the 400-meter IM and ninth in the 200-meter IM. Later that year she also competed at the 2014 FINA World Swimming Championships (25 m), swimming the IM events. She won a bronze in the 200-meter IM and finished sixth in the 100-meter IM.

=== 2015 ===
At the 2015 World Aquatics Championships in Kazan, Russia, Margalis swam a 2:10.41 to finish 7th.

== 2016 Rio Olympic gold medal ==
At the 2016 Summer Olympics in Rio de Janeiro, Brazil Margalis won the gold medal with the U.S. women's 4x200-meter freestyle relay team.

=== 2017 ===
At the 2017 World Aquatics Championships, Margalis had a strong swim in the 200-meter IM, but could not hold off the final 50 surge of US teammate Madisyn Cox, and finished fourth. In 4x200-meter freestyle relay, Leah Smith led off for the Americans in a personal best 1:55.97. Mallory Comerford (1:56.92) and Margalis (1:56.48) took over the middle legs of the relay as they battled down the stretch with China and Russia. It was a very tight race with China going into the final leg, but Katie Ledecky took off with a 1:54.02 split to help the Americans strike gold again.

At the 2017 Winter Nationals Championships Margalis had a busy weekend as she competed in five individual events and managed to grab three individual titles. She broke the Championship Record in the 200-yard IM with a time of 1:52.63 and finished first in 400-yard IM and 100-yard breaststroke.

=== 2018 ===
At the 2018 Pan Pacific Swimming Championships, Margalis secured a silver medal in the 400-meter IM with a time of 4:35.60.

At the 2018 FINA World Swimming Championships (25 m), Margalis earned the silver medal in the 400-meter IM, turning in a career-best time of 4:25.84 in the event finals. She was also runner-up in the 200-meter IM (personal best 2:04.62) and finished fourth in the 100-meter IM, clocking a 58.32, just .21 of a second from reaching a place on the medalist's podium. Margalis was a part of two medal winning relay teams, earning gold in the 4×100-meter medley relay and silver in the 4×200-meter freestyle relay.

=== 2019 ===
==== 2019 World Championships ====
At the 2019 World Aquatics Championships Margalis placed 4th in the final once again in a time of 2:08.91. On Day 5, Margalis raced in the 4×200-meter free relay, where she split 1:55.81 to help USA to a new American record and silver medal behind Australia.

==== International Swimming League ====
In 2019 she was a member of the inaugural International Swimming League representing the Cali Condors, who finished in third place in the final match in Las Vegas, Nevada in December. During the season, Margalis went undefeated in the 400-meter IM breaking the American record several times along the way.

== Coaching career ==
In 2022, she was hired as assistant coach at Georgia Tech, and was later hired as an assistant coach at SMU in 2023.

== Personal life ==
She is married to swimmer Nic Fink, who won three medals at the 2024 Summer Olympics. Their son was born in 2024.

== See also ==
- List of University of Georgia people
