= Matea Samardžić =

Croatian swimmer (born 1995)

Medal record

Swimming

Representing Croatia

European LC Championships
Bronze medal – third place	2016 London	200 m backstroke

Matea Samardžić (born 17 January 1995 in Split, Croatia) is a retired Croatian swimmer. She won a bronze medal in the 200m backstroke event at the 2016 European Aquatics Championships. She qualified for the 2016 Summer Olympics, where she will also compete in the 100m backstroke and the 400m individual medley events.
