= Kim Seo-yeong (swimmer) =

South Korean swimmer (born 1994)

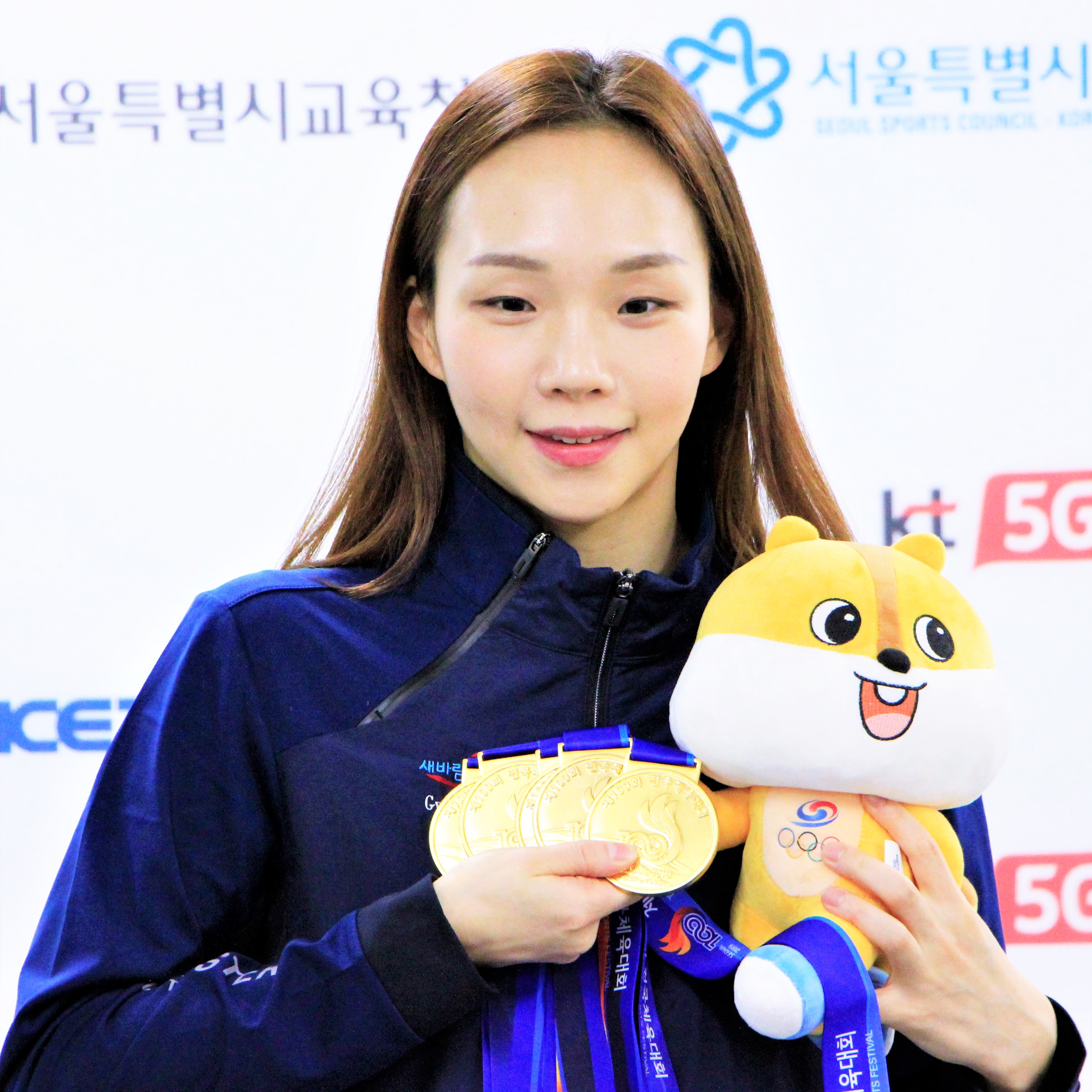
- Kim in 2019

Personal information
- Nationality: South Korea
- Born: March 17, 1994 (age 32) Suwon, Gyeonggi Province, South Korea
- Height: 1.63 m (5 ft 4 in)
- Weight: 51 kg (112 lb)

Sport
- Sport: Swimming
- Strokes: Individual medley
Medal record
Women's swimming
Representing South Korea
Asian Games
Gold medal – first place	2018 Jakarta	200 m medley
Silver medal – second place	2018 Jakarta	400 m medley
Silver medal – second place	2022 Hangzhou	4×100 m medley relay
Bronze medal – third place	2022 Hangzhou	4×200 m freestyle
Bronze medal – third place	2022 Hangzhou	200 m medley
East Asian Games
Bronze medal – third place	2009 Hong Kong	200 m medley
Universiade
Bronze medal – third place	2017 Taipei	200 m medley
Bronze medal – third place	2017 Taipei	400 m medley

Kim Seo-yeong (Korean: 김서영; born March 17, 1994, in Suwon) is a South Korean swimmer, who specialized in individual medley events. Kim broke a South Korean record of 2:13.65 to take the bronze medal in the 200 m individual medley at the 2009 East Asian Games in Hong Kong.

Kim qualified for the women's 400 m individual medley at the 2012 Summer Olympics in London, by clearing a FINA B-standard entry time of 4:46.56 from the Dong-A Swimming Championships in Ulsan. She topped the second heat by nearly two seconds ahead of seven other swimmers, including former bronze medalists Sara Nordenstam of Norway and four-time Olympian Georgina Bardach of Argentina, breaking her personal best of 4:43.99. Kim's overwhelming triumph was not enough to advance her into the final, as she placed seventeenth overall in the preliminary heats. She plans on competing in the 2020 Tokyo Olympics.

In July 2021, she represented South Korea at the 2020 Summer Olympics held in Tokyo, Japan. She competed in the women's 200 metre individual medley and 4 × 200 metre freestyle relay events. In the freestyle event, she advanced to semifinal however missed out to compete in the final. In the freestyle relay event, the team did not advance to compete in the final.
