= Emily Overholt =

Canadian swimmer (born 1997)

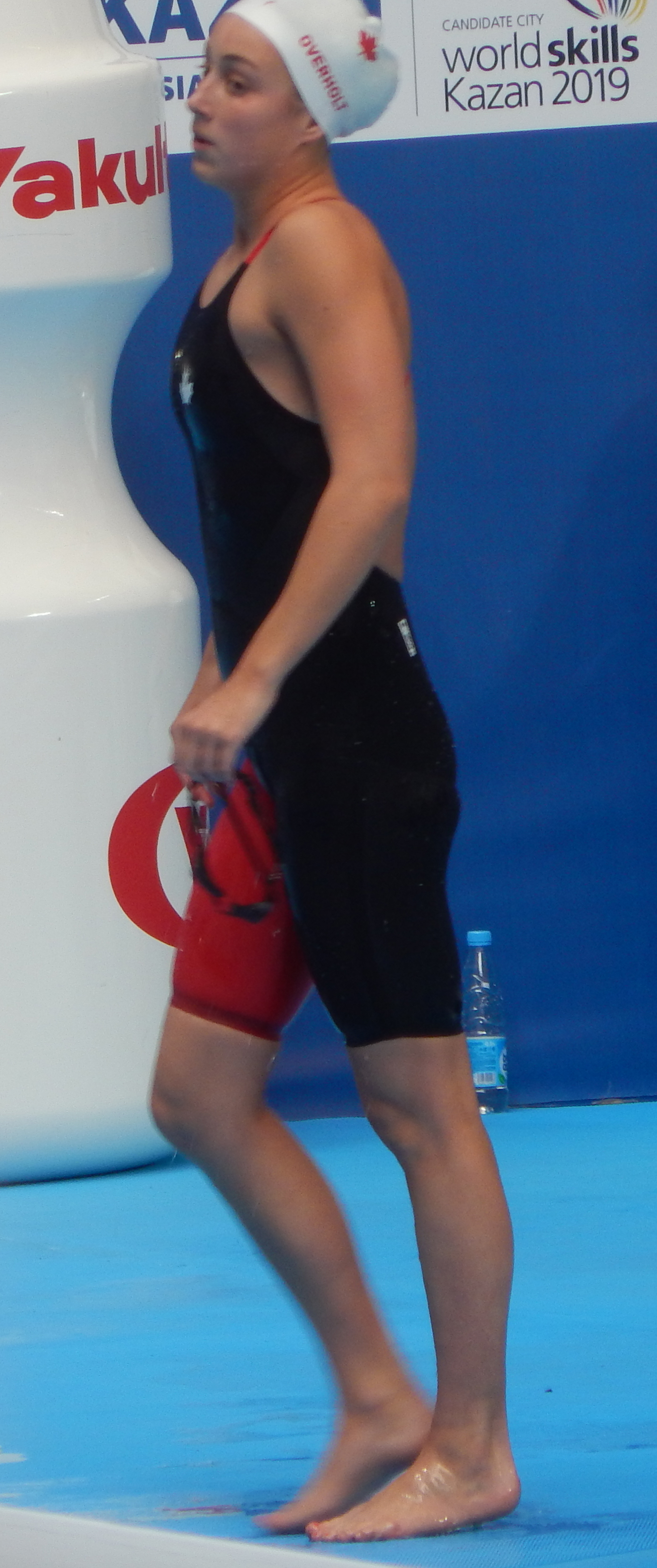
- Overholt in 2015

Personal information
- National team: Canada
- Born: October 4, 1997 (age 28) Vancouver, British Columbia, Canada
- Height: 1.70 m (5 ft 7 in)
- Weight: 55 kg (121 lb)

Sport
- Sport: Swimming
- Strokes: Freestyle, medley
- Club: UBC Thunderbirds
Medal record
Women's swimming
Representing Canada
Olympic Games
Bronze medal – third place	2016 Rio de Janeiro	4×200 m freestyle
World Championships (LC)
Bronze medal – third place	2015 Kazan	400 m medley
Bronze medal – third place	2019 Gwangju	4×200 m freestyle
Pan Pacific Championships
Bronze medal – third place	2014 Gold Coast	4×200 m freestyle
Pan American Games
Gold medal – first place	2015 Toronto	400 m freestyle
Silver medal – second place	2015 Toronto	200 m freestyle
Bronze medal – third place	2015 Toronto	4×200 m freestyle
Commonwealth Games
Silver medal – second place	2014 Glasgow	4×200 m freestyle

Emily Overholt (born October 4, 1997) is a Canadian former competitive swimmer. She has won bronze medals at the Olympic Games and FINA World Aquatics Championships, as well as a silver at the Commonwealth Games and three Pan American Games medals. Overholt also won three gold and a silver at the 2013 Canada Games as a representative for British Columbia.

== Career ==
Overholt began swimming at the age of 9 with the West Vancouver Otters. Her main inspiration for being a competitive swimmer was watching Michael Phelps during the 2008 Summer Olympics, while she states her overall sports inspiration is skater-cyclist Clara Hughes.

Overholt attended the 2013 Canada Games representing British Columbia as a 15-year-old competitor. There she won gold in the individual 200 m and 400 m medleys while adding a gold and a silver in the 400 m and 200 m freestyle respectively. She next won a bronze medal in the 400 m individual medley at the 2013 FINA World Junior Swimming Championships. Overholt's first major competitive podium finish came in Glasgow, Scotland as part of the 4×200 m freestyle relay at the 2014 Commonwealth Games, where she competed as a sixteen-year-old and helped the relay team win a silver medal. She also anchored the team that won a bronze medal in the 2014 Pan Pacific Swimming Championships.

During the 2015 Pan American Games in Toronto, Overholt won three medals, including a gold in the 400-meter freestyle. The victory occurred less than a day after she was disqualified of a gold medal in the 400 m medley for an illegal turn. After the Pan Am Games, Overholt practiced her turns heavily to ensure no similar problems at the 2015 World Aquatics Championships in Russia. There, Overholt won a bronze at the 400 m medley and beat the national record by more than three seconds.

Overholt attended Collingwood School. She has signed into the University of British Columbia for a degree in science, but deferred her studies and participation in the UBC Thunderbirds until after the 2016 Summer Olympics.

In 2016, she was officially named to Canada's Olympic team for the 2016 Summer Olympics. Despite being hampered by a hamstring injury, Overholt qualified for the 400 m medley final and finished fifth. Despite thinking her Olympic participation was over, when Brittany MacLean could not attend the 4 × 200 m relay qualifying heats due to illness, Overholt was called in to replace her and helped the team reach the finals. Canada went on to win a bronze medal. After returning to Canada, Overholt struggled with heavy depression, being hospitalized until December, and only returned to competition in an UBC meet in January. She was then absent from the U Sports season and the Team Canada trials for the 2017 World Championship for not having fully overcome the hamstring injury. By November, Overholt was fully fit and swimming for the Thunderbirds. She has since won two straight U Sports swimming championships for the Thunderbirds, winning all four races she entered in the 2019 meet. In her return to the Pan Pacifics in Tokyo 2018, Overholt finished fifth in both the 400m freestyle and individual medley. In the 2019 World Aquatics Championships, Overholt finished fifth on the 400m medley and got a bronze in the 4 × 200 m relay.

In June 2021, Overholt announced she was retiring as even after undergoing surgery early in the year, her body had not recovered well enough for her to remain competitive. Earlier in the year, she missed the Olympic qualifying times for three races.

== See also ==
- List of Olympic medalists in swimming (women)
- List of World Aquatics Championships medalists in swimming (women)
- List of Commonwealth Games medallists in swimming (women)
