= Sakiko Shimizu =

Japanese swimmer (born 1992)

Personal information
- Nationality: Japanese
- Born: 20 April 1992 (age 34) Tochigi Prefecture, Japan
- Height: 156 cm (5 ft 1 in)
- Weight: 50 kg (110 lb)

Sport
- Sport: Swimming
Medal record
Representing Japan
Pan Pacific Championships
Bronze medal – third place	2018 Tokyo	400 m medley
Asian Games
Gold medal – first place	2018 Jakarta	4×100 m medley
Silver medal – second place	2014 Incheon	400 m medley
Bronze medal – third place	2018 Jakarta	400 m medley

Sakiko Shimizu (清水 咲子, Shimizu Sakiko; born 20 April 1992) is a Japanese swimmer.

She competed at the 2016 Summer Olympics in Rio de Janeiro, where she qualified to the final in the women's 400 metre individual medley.
