= Yui Ohashi =

Japanese swimmer (born 1995)

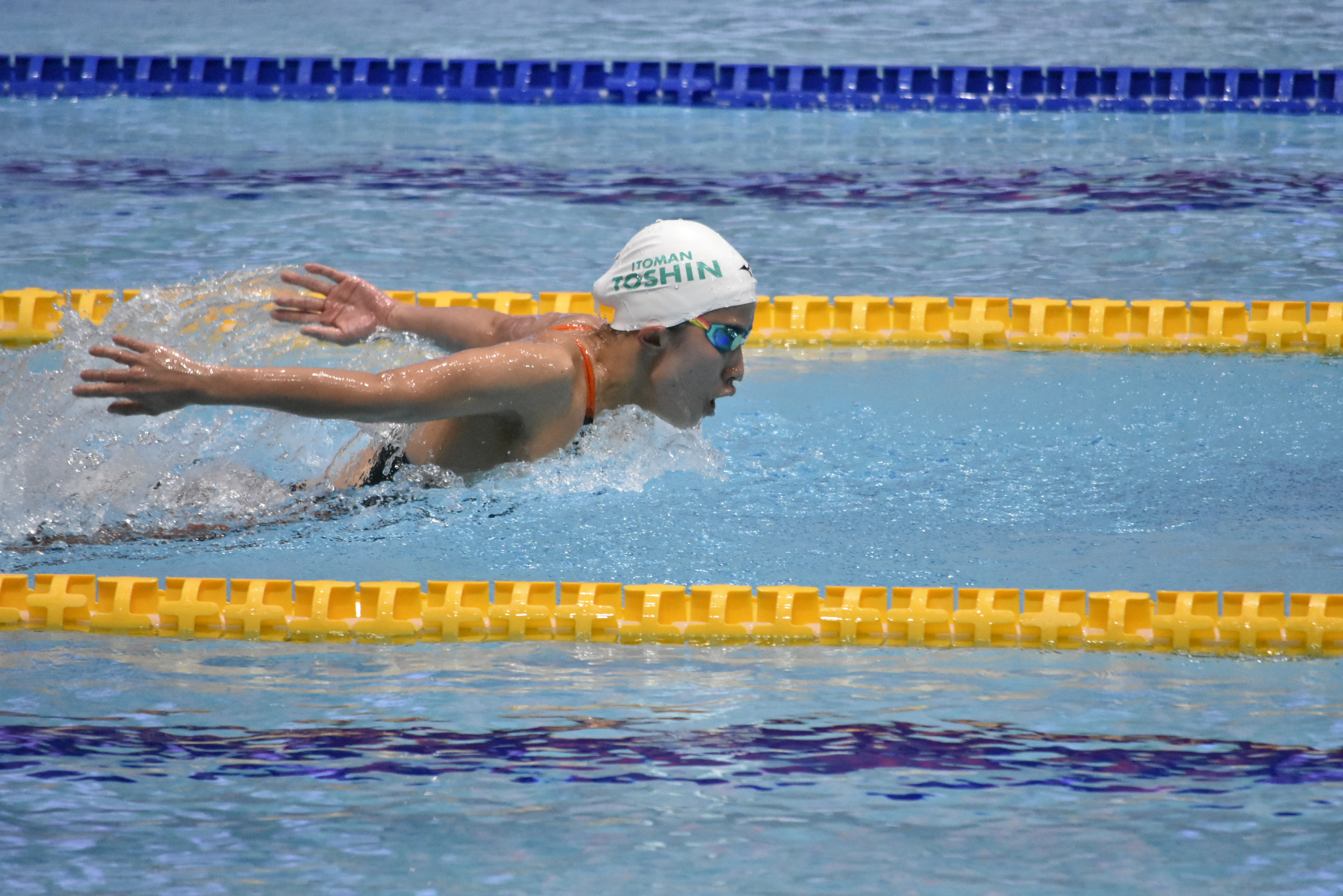
- Ohashi in 2020

Personal information
- Born: 18 October 1995 (age 31) Hikone, Japan
- Height: 1.74 m (5 ft 9 in)
- Weight: 55 kg (121 lb)

Sport
- Sport: Swimming
- Strokes: Medley
- Club: Itoman Toshin
- College team: Toyo University
Medal record
Women's swimming
Representing Japan
Event	1st	2nd	3rd
Olympic Games	2	0	0
World Championships	0	1	1
Pan Pacific Championships	2	0	0
Asian Games	1	2	0
Total	5	3	1
Olympic Games
Gold medal – first place	2020 Tokyo	200 m medley
Gold medal – first place	2020 Tokyo	400 m medley
World Championships
Silver medal – second place	2017 Budapest	200 m medley
Bronze medal – third place	2019 Gwangju	400 m medley
Pan Pacific Championships
Gold medal – first place	2018 Tokyo	200 m medley
Gold medal – first place	2018 Tokyo	400 m medley
Asian Games
Gold medal – first place	2018 Jakarta	400 m medley
Silver medal – second place	2018 Jakarta	200 m medley
Silver medal – second place	2018 Jakarta	4×200 m freestyle
Asian Championships
Gold medal – first place	2016 Tokyo	200 m medley
Bronze medal – third place	2016 Tokyo	400 m medley
Summer Universiade
Gold medal – first place	2017 Taipei	200 m medley
Gold medal – first place	2017 Taipei	400 m medley
Bronze medal – third place	2017 Taipei	4×200 m freestyle

Yui Ohashi (Japanese: 大橋 悠依, Hepburn: Ōhashi Yui; born 18 October 1995) is a retired Japanese swimmer, specializing in the medley events. She became the first Japanese woman to dip beneath the 2:08-barrier in the women's 200 metre individual medley event at the 2017 World Aquatics Championships, finishing with a silver-medal time and a national record of 2:07.91.

Ohashi qualified to represent Japan at the 2020 Summer Olympics. She won Japan's second gold in the 2020 Summer Olympics, winning the Women's 400m individual medley. She also won the gold medal in the Women's 200m individual medley.

== Career best times ==
=== Long course meters ===
Event	Time	Meet	Location	Date	Notes
200 m individual medley	2:07.91	2017 World Aquatics Championships	Budapest, Hungary	24 July 2017	NR
400 m individual medley	4:30.82	2018 Japan Swim	Tokyo, Japan	8 March 2018	NR

Legend: NR – Japanese record; e – equalled existing record;
Records not set in finals: h – heat; sf – semifinal; r – relay 1st leg; rh – relay heat 1st leg; b – B final; † – en route to final mark; so – swim-off; tt – time trial

== See also ==
- List of multiple Olympic gold medalists at a single Games
