= Katinka Hosszú =

Hungarian swimmer (born 1989)

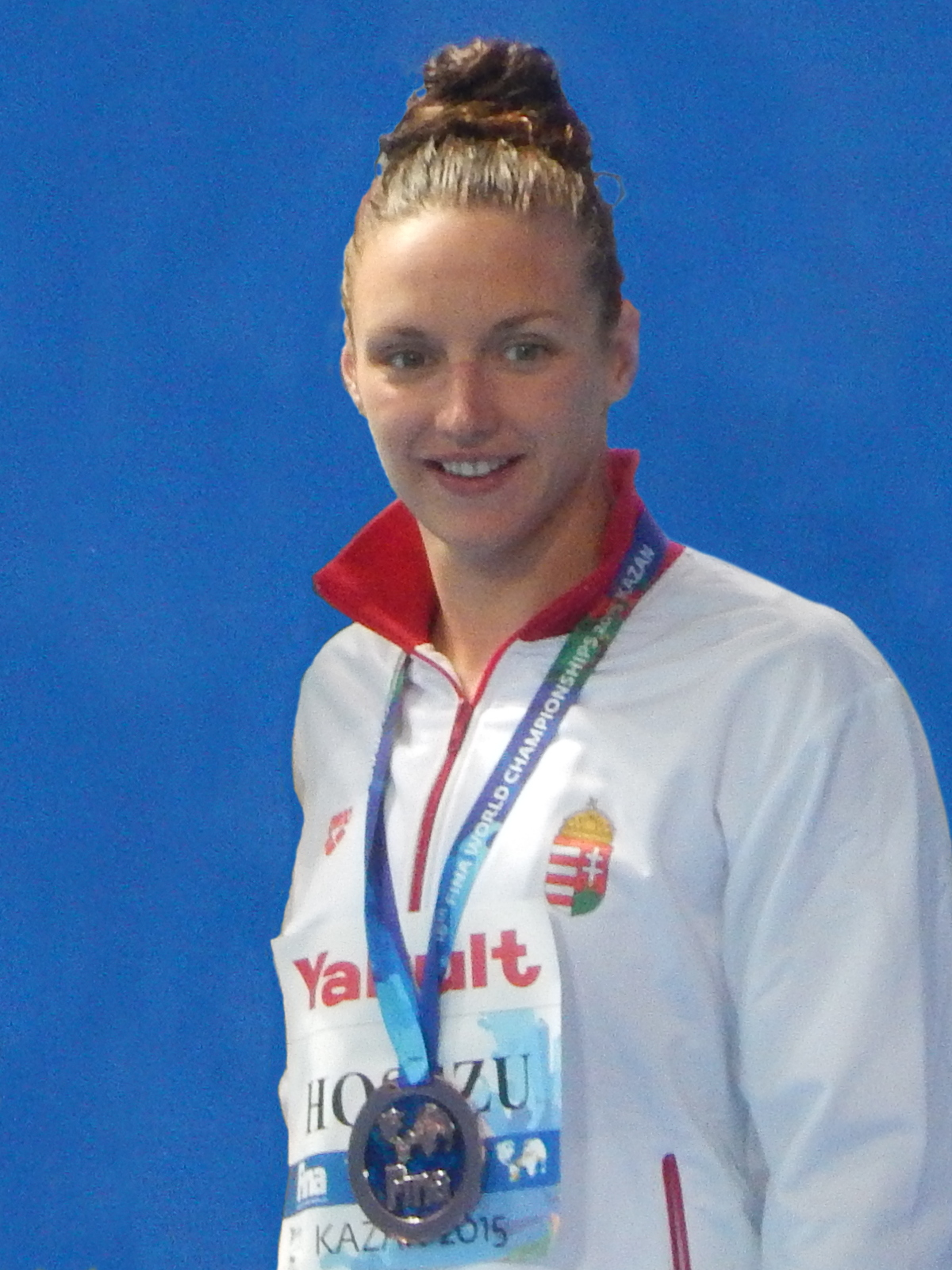
- Hosszú at the 2015 World Championships

Personal information
- Nickname: "Iron Lady"
- National team: Hungary
- Born: 3 May 1989 (age 37) Pécs, Hungary
- Height: 1.75 m (5 ft 9 in)
- Weight: 68 kg (150 lb)

Sport
- Sport: Swimming
- Strokes: Freestyle, medley, backstroke, butterfly
- Club: Iron Swim Club, Budapest; Team Iron (ISL)
- College team: University of Southern California
- Coach: Dave Salo (USC)
Medal record
Women's swimming
Representing Hungary
Event	1st	2nd	3rd
Olympic Games	3	1	0
World Championships (LC)	9	1	5
World Championships (SC)	17	8	2
European Championships (LC)	15	6	4
European Championships (SC)	20	4	2
Total	64	20	13
Olympic Games
Gold medal – first place	2016 Rio de Janeiro	100 m backstroke
Gold medal – first place	2016 Rio de Janeiro	200 m medley
Gold medal – first place	2016 Rio de Janeiro	400 m medley
Silver medal – second place	2016 Rio de Janeiro	200 m backstroke
World Championships (LC)
Gold medal – first place	2009 Rome	400 m medley
Gold medal – first place	2013 Barcelona	200 m medley
Gold medal – first place	2013 Barcelona	400 m medley
Gold medal – first place	2015 Kazan	200 m medley
Gold medal – first place	2015 Kazan	400 m medley
Gold medal – first place	2017 Budapest	200 m medley
Gold medal – first place	2017 Budapest	400 m medley
Gold medal – first place	2019 Gwangju	200 m medley
Gold medal – first place	2019 Gwangju	400 m medley
Silver medal – second place	2017 Budapest	200 m backstroke
Bronze medal – third place	2009 Rome	200 m butterfly
Bronze medal – third place	2009 Rome	200 m medley
Bronze medal – third place	2013 Barcelona	200 m butterfly
Bronze medal – third place	2015 Kazan	200 m backstroke
Bronze medal – third place	2017 Budapest	200 m butterfly
World Championships (SC)
Gold medal – first place	2012 Istanbul	200 m butterfly
Gold medal – first place	2012 Istanbul	100 m medley
Gold medal – first place	2014 Doha	100 m backstroke
Gold medal – first place	2014 Doha	200 m backstroke
Gold medal – first place	2014 Doha	100 m medley
Gold medal – first place	2014 Doha	200 m medley
Gold medal – first place	2016 Windsor	100 m backstroke
Gold medal – first place	2016 Windsor	200 m backstroke
Gold medal – first place	2016 Windsor	100 m butterfly
Gold medal – first place	2016 Windsor	200 m butterfly
Gold medal – first place	2016 Windsor	100 m medley
Gold medal – first place	2016 Windsor	200 m medley
Gold medal – first place	2016 Windsor	400 m medley
Gold medal – first place	2018 Hangzhou	200 m butterfly
Gold medal – first place	2018 Hangzhou	100 m medley
Gold medal – first place	2018 Hangzhou	200 m medley
Gold medal – first place	2018 Hangzhou	400 m medley
Silver medal – second place	2012 Istanbul	200 m freestyle
Silver medal – second place	2012 Istanbul	200 m medley
Silver medal – second place	2014 Doha	200 m freestyle
Silver medal – second place	2014 Doha	200 m butterfly
Silver medal – second place	2014 Doha	400 m medley
Silver medal – second place	2016 Windsor	200 m freestyle
Silver medal – second place	2016 Windsor	50 m backstroke
Silver medal – second place	2018 Hangzhou	100 m backstroke
Bronze medal – third place	2012 Istanbul	400 m medley
Bronze medal – third place	2014 Doha	50 m backstroke
European Championships (LC)
Gold medal – first place	2010 Budapest	200 m butterfly
Gold medal – first place	2010 Budapest	200 m medley
Gold medal – first place	2010 Budapest	4×200 m freestyle
Gold medal – first place	2012 Debrecen	200 m butterfly
Gold medal – first place	2012 Debrecen	200 m medley
Gold medal – first place	2012 Debrecen	400 m medley
Gold medal – first place	2014 Berlin	100 m backstroke
Gold medal – first place	2014 Berlin	200 m medley
Gold medal – first place	2014 Berlin	400 m medley
Gold medal – first place	2016 London	200 m backstroke
Gold medal – first place	2016 London	200 m medley
Gold medal – first place	2016 London	400 m medley
Gold medal – first place	2016 London	4×200 m freestyle
Gold medal – first place	2018 Glasgow	200 m medley
Gold medal – first place	2020 Budapest	400 m medley
Silver medal – second place	2008 Eindhoven	400 m medley
Silver medal – second place	2010 Budapest	400 m medley
Silver medal – second place	2012 Debrecen	4×200 m freestyle
Silver medal – second place	2014 Berlin	200 m freestyle
Silver medal – second place	2016 London	100 m backstroke
Silver medal – second place	2020 Budapest	200 m butterfly
Bronze medal – third place	2014 Berlin	200 m butterfly
Bronze medal – third place	2014 Berlin	4×200 m freestyle
Bronze medal – third place	2020 Budapest	200 m medley
Bronze medal – third place	2022 Rome	4×200 m freestyle
European Championships (SC)
Gold medal – first place	2012 Chartres	200 m butterfly
Gold medal – first place	2012 Chartres	100 m medley
Gold medal – first place	2012 Chartres	200 m medley
Gold medal – first place	2013 Herning	200 m medley
Gold medal – first place	2015 Netanya	50 m backstroke
Gold medal – first place	2015 Netanya	100 m backstroke
Gold medal – first place	2015 Netanya	200 m backstroke
Gold medal – first place	2015 Netanya	100 m medley
Gold medal – first place	2015 Netanya	200 m medley
Gold medal – first place	2015 Netanya	400 m medley
Gold medal – first place	2017 Copenhagen	50 m backstroke
Gold medal – first place	2017 Copenhagen	100 m backstroke
Gold medal – first place	2017 Copenhagen	200 m backstroke
Gold medal – first place	2017 Copenhagen	100 m medley
Gold medal – first place	2017 Copenhagen	200 m medley
Gold medal – first place	2017 Copenhagen	400 m medley
Gold medal – first place	2019 Glasgow	200 m butterfly
Gold medal – first place	2019 Glasgow	100 m medley
Gold medal – first place	2019 Glasgow	200 m medley
Gold medal – first place	2019 Glasgow	400 m medley
Silver medal – second place	2012 Chartres	400 m medley
Silver medal – second place	2013 Herning	100 m medley
Silver medal – second place	2013 Herning	400 m medley
Silver medal – second place	2015 Netanya	400 m freestyle
Bronze medal – third place	2004 Vienna	400 m medley
Bronze medal – third place	2013 Herning	200 m backstroke

Katinka Hosszú (Hungarian: [ˈkɑtiŋkɑ ˈhossuː]; born 3 May 1989) is a Hungarian former competitive swimmer specialized in individual medley events. She is a three-time Olympic champion and a nine-time long-course world champion. She is the owner of a Budapest-based swim school and swim club called Iron Swim Budapest, and a co-owner and was captain of Team Iron, founding member of the International Swimming League.

Hosszú held seven world records in the course of her career, and was the first swimmer (male or female) to hold world records in all five individual medley events at the same time. She holds two-thirds of the Hungarian national records. Hosszú was named FINA Swimmer of the Year in 2014, 2015, 2016 and 2018, and won SwimSwam's Swammy Award for Female Swimmer of the Year in 2013.

Hosszú competed at five Summer Olympics: 2004, 2008, 2012, 2016, and 2020. After a long tenure under head coach Shane Tusup, who was her husband, following their divorce Hosszú was coached by Dave Salo before moving onto Árpád Petrov. At the end of 2019 she parted ways with Petrov, and by the following year had hired József Nagy to be her coach.

She was one of the most versatile swimmers in the world, and was nicknamed the "Iron Lady", which she has since turned into a fast growing international brand. In 2014 she became the first race-prize dollar millionaire (man or woman) in swimming history.

In 2019, Forbes magazine considered her to be the most valuable Hungarian athlete, having ranked in the first position for the previous five years.

== Personal life ==
Katinka Hosszú was born in Pécs, Hungary, the daughter of Barbara Bakos and István Hosszú. She is the youngest of three (Gergely and Ádám). Katinka grew up in Baja and was coached in swimming by her grandfather, László Bakos until the age of 13. Hosszú met her future husband Shane Tusup in 2009, when they were both freshmen at the University of Southern California. After being crushed under the pressure of expectations at the 2012 London Olympics and not medalling, she asked her then boyfriend Tusup to become her coach, replacing her coach since her U.S.C. swim team days, Dave Salo. After the Olympics, at the Beijing World Cup swim meet, she competed in 8 events, medalling in 5 of them, leading to Chinese newspapers says she was made out of iron, leading to her nickname, The Iron Lady. Hosszú married Tusup in 2013. She graduated from USC with a degree in psychology.

In August 2016, Hosszú lost a defamation lawsuit against writer Casey Barrett, magazine Swimming World, and publisher Sports Publications International, Incorporated. She had filed the lawsuit in November 2015 after the magazine published an article on its website in May 2015 questioning whether Hosszú was using performance-enhancing substances, despite Hosszú never having been found to use such substances. The lawsuit was dismissed because the judge ruled the article to clearly be an opinion piece. Hosszú and husband Tusup opened their own swim club in Hungary, Iron Aquatics in September 2016.

On 16 February 2018 Hosszú filed for divorce from Tusup. On 25 May 2018 Hosszú's Facebook page was deleted by Tusup, who was the sole administrator of the page. However, on 6 June 2018 she regained access to her Facebook page with the assistance of activist and women's rights defender Matan Uziel.

In January 2022, Hosszú announced her engagement to her boyfriend since 2019, Máté Layber-Gelencsér. The two got married in August 2022. Later in the year, a biographical film entitled "Katinka", which portrays her life, was released in theaters. Together they have two daughters, born in 2023 and 2025.

== Swimming career ==
Hosszú was renowned throughout the swimming world for swimming many events well in a short space of time. During the third leg of the 2014 FINA/MASTBANK Swimming World Cup, organised in the Victoria Park Swimming Pool of Hong Kong, she got an unprecedented achievement winning 12 medals out of the 17 individual events for the two-day meet. 10 gold (200 m, 400 m and 800 m free, 50 m, 100 m and 200 m backstroke, 200 m butterfly, 100 m, 200 m and 400 m individual medley) and 2 silver (50 m free and 50 m butterfly).

Hosszú is an active part of the swimming community as well. She is one of 30 swimmers who have founded the Global Association of Professional Swimmers in 2017. She is also working on reforming swimming as an entertainment by being the ambassador for the International Swimming League, a new initiative with the aim of organizing and reorganizing swimming competitions.

=== 2004 ===
==== 2004 Summer Olympics ====
Hosszú made her international debut at the age of 15 representing Hungary at the 2004 Summer Olympics where she competed in the 200-meter freestyle finishing 31st with a time of 2:04.22.

==== 2004 European Short Course Swimming Championships ====
She won her first medal at the 2004 European Short Course Swimming Championships, a bronze in the 400-meter individual medley (4:35,41).

=== 2005-2011 ===
==== 2005 European Junior Swimming Championships ====
At the 2005 European Junior Swimming Championships held in Budapest she won three gold medals in 200-meter freestyle, 400-meter individual medley and the 4×100-meter freestyle relay. Two silver medals in 400-meter freestyle and the 4×200-meter freestyle relay. And a bronze medal in the 800-meter freestyle.

==== 2008 European Championships ====
She won her first long course medal at the 2008 European Championships, a silver in 400-meter individual medley (4:37.43).

==== 2009 World Championships ====
At the 2009 World Championships she won two bronze medals in the 200-meter individual medley and 200-meter butterfly before becoming World Champion in the 400-meter individual medley. She was elected Hungarian Sportswoman of the Year for her achievements.

==== 2010 European Championships ====
At the 2010 European Championships held in her home country, she won a silver medal in 400-meter medley and became European Champion in 200-meter butterfly, 200-meter medley and as a member of the 4 × 200-meter freestyle relay team.

==== 2011 NCAA Championships ====
In 2011 Hosszú had one of the finest seasons in college history winning 3 individual National Championships: 200y IM (1:53.39), 400y IM (3:59.75) and 200y fly (1:51.69). She was named Pac-10 Swimmer of the Year, CSCAA Swimmer of the Year and got the Honda Sports Award in swimming and diving, designating her as the nation's top collegiate female athlete for this year in this sport.

=== 2012 ===
==== 2012 Summer Olympics ====
Competing in the 2012 Summer Olympics, she finished fourth in the 400-meter individual medley with a time of 4:33.49, just outside of the medals. She also finished eighth in the 200-meter individual medley and missed the finals for the 200-meter butterfly.

Despite that after the disappointment at the 2012 London Olympics, Tamás Gyárfás, the then president of the Hungarian Swimming Association even advised her to retire, she decided not to give up her swimming career and since then she has been coached by her husband Shane Tusup, a former American professional swimmer himself.

=== 2013 ===
In 2013, Hosszú set out to redeem herself after her medal-less performance at the 2012 Olympics. She attended numerous competitions and swam highly rigorous programs at each one, earning herself the nickname of the "Iron Lady". She earned three medals (two gold, one bronze) at the World Championships and a gold and two silvers at the European Championships. She also amassed a total of 24 golds and broke 6 world records during the World Cup series.

==== 2013 World Championships ====
2013 World Championships
Gold medal – first place	200 m individual medley	2:07.92
Gold medal – first place	400 m individual medley	4:30.41
Bronze medal – third place	200 m butterfly	2:05.59

At the 2013 World Championships, she pulled out of the 100-meter backstroke after qualifying second in the heats (preliminary races), to concentrate on the final of the 200-meter individual medley which she subsequently won with a time of 2:07.92. She then touched third in the 200-meter butterfly behind Liu Zige and Mireia Belmonte. She capped off her competition with a final gold in the 400-meter individual medley, finishing in 4:30.41.

==== 2013 World Cup Series ====
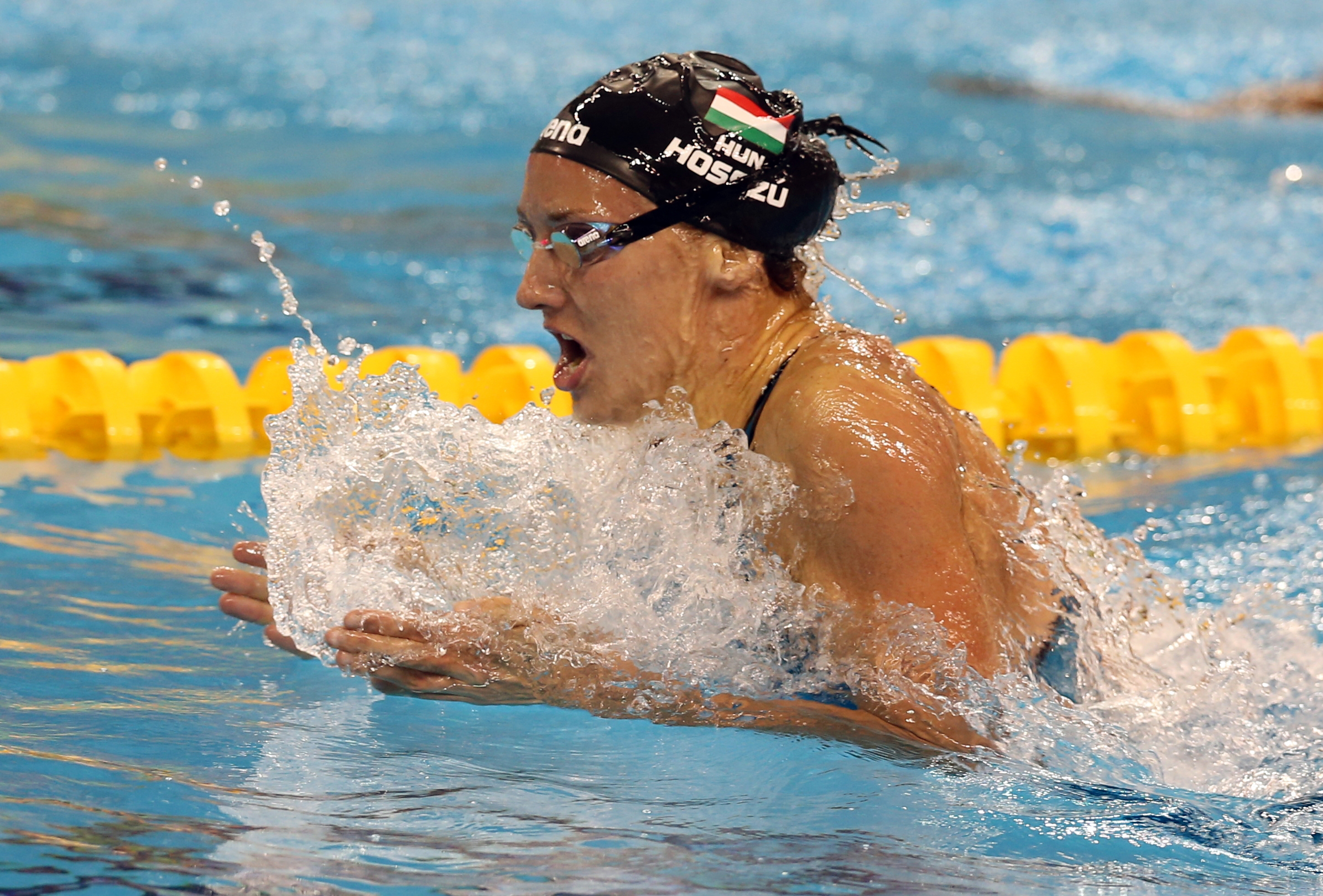
Hosszú in 2013

Throughout the 2013 World Cup series, she set world records in 100-meter IM, 200-meter IM, and 400-meter IM, breaking the 200-meter record twice and 100-meter record three times.

=== 2014-2015 ===
In 2014, Hosszú broke the short course world records in the 100-meter and 200-meter individual backstroke events and in 100-, 200-, and 400-meter individual medleys.

==== 2015 World Championships ====
2015 World Championships
Gold medal – first place	200 m individual medley	2:06.12 (WR)
Gold medal – first place	400 m individual medley	4:30.39
Bronze medal – third place	200 m backstroke	2:06.84

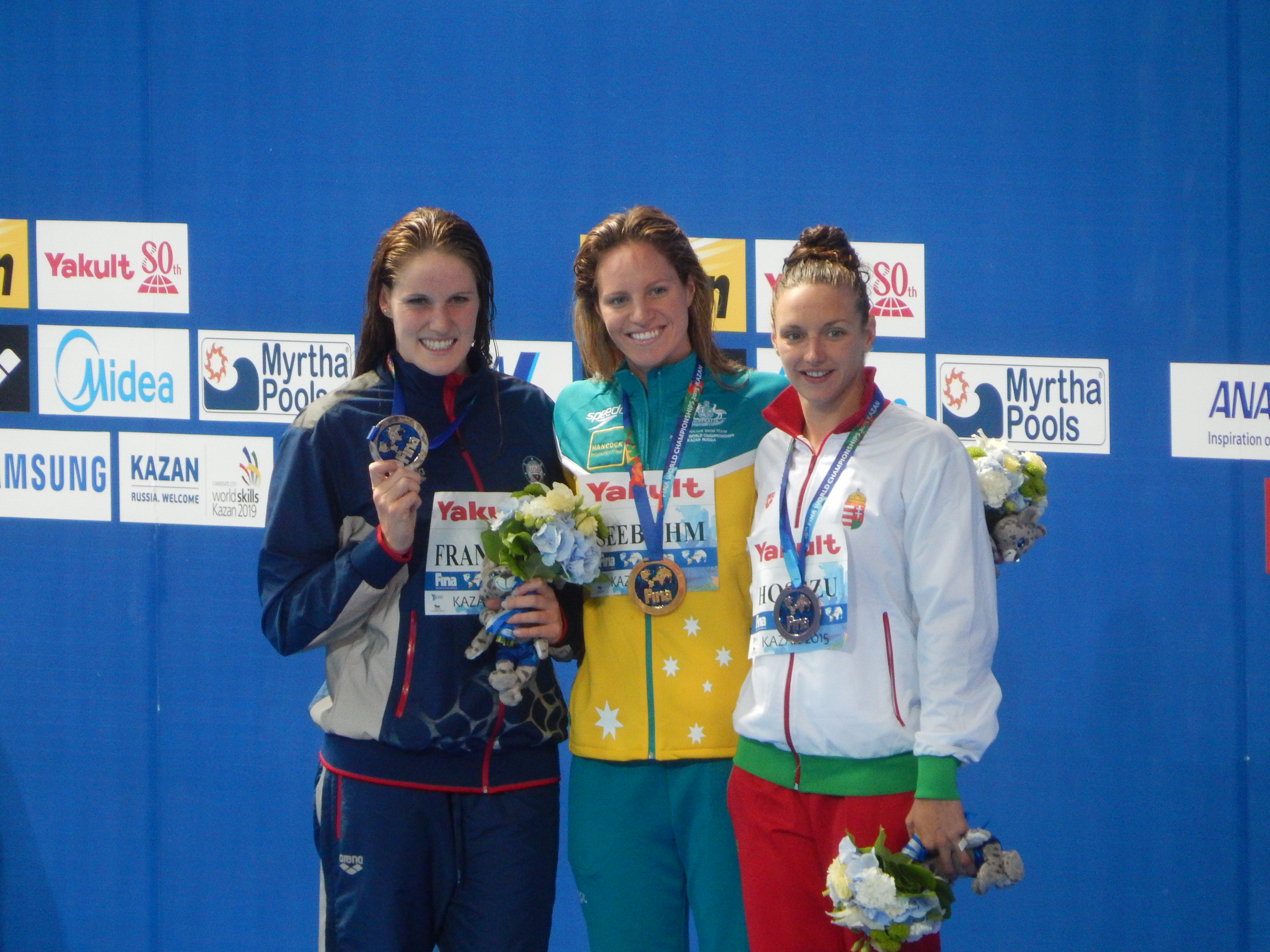
Hosszú (right), Emily Seebohm of Australia, and Missy Franklin of U.S. in the victory ceremony of 2015 World Aquatics Championships

At the 2015 World Championships in Kazan, Hosszú again dealt with a monster programme, competing in the 200- and 400-meter individual medley, 100- and 200-meter backstroke, 100- and 200-meter freestyle, and 200-meter butterfly. She posted the top time in the prelims of the 100-meter backstroke, but elected to pull out of the semifinal to concentrate on the 200-meter individual medley final, a decision which ultimately paid off. She broke the previous world record set by Ariana Kukors back in 2009 in a stunning time of 2:06.12. Hosszú's time of 58.78 in the prelims of the 100-meter backstroke would have earned her a bronze medal in the final; however the 200-meter individual medley final was 30 minutes after the backstroke semifinal and swimming it might have cost her the gold medal and the world record in the 200-meter individual medley. In addition, Hosszú won bronze in the 200-meter backstroke, placed fifth in the 200-meter freestyle, and capped it off with a victory in the 400-meter individual medley on the last day.

==== 2015 European Short Course Championships ====
Hosszú won six gold medals at the 2015 European Short Course Championships, sweeping all three backstroke and three individual medley events. She broke world records in the 100- and 400-meter individual medleys.

=== 2016 ===
==== 2016 Summer Olympics ====
2016 Olympics
Gold medal – first place	100 m backstroke	58.45
Gold medal – first place	200 m individual medley	2:06.58 (OR)
Gold medal – first place	400 m individual medley	4:26.36 (WR)
Silver medal – second place	200 m backstroke	2:06.05

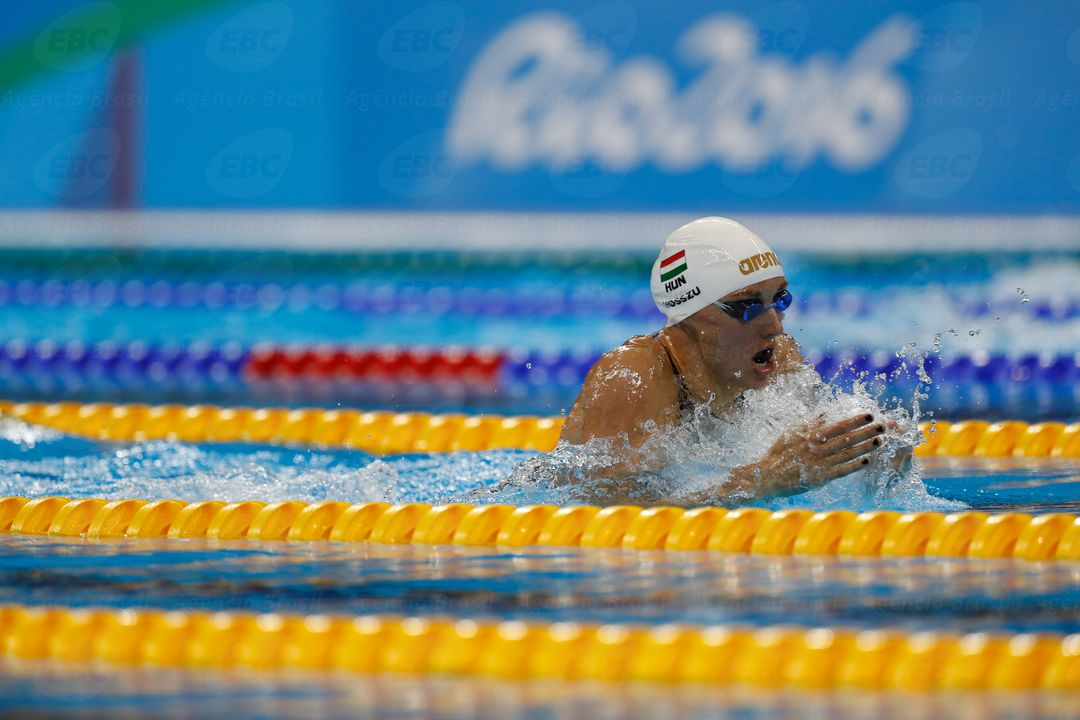
Katinka Hosszú in Rio 2016

At the 2016 Summer Olympics in Rio de Janeiro, Hosszú won the gold medal and broke the world record in the 400-meter individual medley, won the gold medal and broke the Olympic record in the 200-meter individual medley, and won a third gold medal in the 100-meter backstroke. She also won a silver in the 200-meter backstroke behind American Maya DiRado. With 3 gold medals and 1 silver, Hosszú won more medals in individual events than any other swimmer in the 2016 Summer Olympics.

==== 2016 World Short Course Championships ====
In the World Short Course Championships in Windsor, Hosszú won a record 9 individual medals (7 gold and 2 silver) and reached 11 individual finals. She won the 100-, 200-, and 400-meter individual medley, 100- and 200-meter butterfly, and 100- and 200-meter backstroke. Additionally, she took silver in the 200-meter freestyle and 50-meter backstroke.

=== 2017 ===
==== 2017 Swim Open Stockholm ====
In April, Hosszú competed in Swim Open Stockholm and won the 1500-meter freestyle event with a time of 16:22.30. She came second in the 200-meter freestyle with a time of 1:57.01, finishing behind Michelle Coleman. She also came second in the 50-meter backstroke event with a time of 28.54.

==== 2017 World Championships ====
Katinka Hosszú won gold in the 400-meter individual medley

At the 2017 World Championships in her home country Hungary, Hosszú swam another rigorous schedule. She won her first gold medal in the 200-meter individual medley with a time of 2:07.00. She also won the gold medal and broke the Championships record in the 400-meter individual medley with a time of 4:29.33.

=== 2018 ===
==== 2018 European Championships ====
At the 2018 European Championship in Glasgow Hosszú won the gold medal in the 200-meter individual medley becoming the first female swimmer to win the same event in five consecutive editions (2010–2018). She joined her compatriot László Cseh who achieved the same twice, in the 400m IM (2004–2012) and in the 200m IM (2006–2014).

=== 2019 ===
==== 2019 World Championships ====
2019 World Championships
Gold medal – first place	200 m individual medley	2:07.53
Gold medal – first place	400 m individual medley	4:30.39

At the 2019 World Championships held in Gwangju, South Korea, Hosszú became the first female swimmer ever to win four straight world titles (2013–2019) in a single event (200m IM). Six days later she also won the gold medal in the 400-meter individual medley to become the first woman to win five world titles in the same event and only the second swimmer after Michael Phelps who achieved the same feat in the 200m fly.

==== FINA World Cup ====
On November the 1st Hosszú claimed her 300th overall gold medal at the FINA Swimming World Cup.

==== International Swimming League ====
The Hosszú-owned professional swim team, Team Iron was founding member of the International Swimming League. She was co-captain of the team alongside Peter John Stevens. During the 2019 International Swimming League season, Hosszú won the 200IM, 400IM and 200 fly events all 3 times the team competed. She also earned MVP title in the ISL Budapest match in Duna Arena.

=== 2020-2021 ===
==== 2020 European Championships ====
At the 2020 European Championships Hosszú became the female swimmer with the most medals in the history of the European Championships. After winning one gold (400 IM) one silver (200 fly) and one bronze (200 IM) in Budapest, she now has 24 medals dating back to 2008 (15 gold, 6 silver, 3 bronze). Overall, she is ranked only behind Alexander Popov who won 26 medals (21 gold) in his European Champs career.

==== 2020 Summer Olympics ====
Hosszú did not perform well in the 2020 Summer Olympics, failing to reach the 200m backstroke final and finishing only fifth in the 400m medley and seventh in the 200m one. She would attribute this to the standstill in the one-year delay caused by the COVID-19 pandemic, cancelling the tournaments she entered to keep herself in competition rhythm, while analysts added that Hosszú was not helped by being among the oldest swimmers and constantly changing coaches starting with her 2018 split with Tusup.

=== 2022–24 ===
In the 2022 World Aquatics Championships, Hosszú failed to medal by finishing 7th in the 200m individual medley and 5th in the 400m individual medley. In the 2022 European Championships that followed, Hosszú only medaled once, as part of Hungary's 4 × 200 m freestyle relay, while only reaching the 200 individual medley final and finishing 8th. Afterwards she claimed that she would probably not be swimming by the 2024 Summer Olympics, instead settling down with coach Máté Gelencsér, whom she married a few weeks after the European Championship.

Hosszú gave birth to daughter in August 2023, and a few months later started training hoping to enter her sixth Olympics. but she wound up not reaching the necessary qualifying times. In January 2025, Hosszú announced her retirement.

== Personal best times ==
=== Long course ===
Event	Time	Location	Date	Notes
50 m freestyle	24.89 (r)	São Paulo	21 April 2014	^{[b]}
100 m freestyle	53.64	Singapore	5 September 2014	NR
200 m freestyle	1:55.41	Dubai	6 November 2015	NR
400 m freestyle	4:04.96	Bergen	29 May 2016	
50 m backstroke	27.99	Dubai	6 November 2015	NR
100 m backstroke	58.45	Rio de Janeiro	8 August 2016	NR
200 m backstroke	2:05.85	Budapest	29 July 2017	NR
200 m butterfly	2:04.27 (sf)	Rome	26 July 2009	ER
200 m IM	2:06.12	Kazan	3 August 2015	ER^{[a]}
400 m IM	4:26.36	Rio de Janeiro	6 August 2016	ER^{[a]}

=== Short course metres ===
Event	Time	Location	Date	Notes
50 m freestyle	24.43	Saint-Paul	29 December 2014	^{[b]}
100 m freestyle	52.12	Chartres	27 August 2016	^{[b]}
200 m freestyle	1:51.18	Doha	7 December 2014	NR
400 m freestyle	3:58.84	Netanya	6 December 2015	^{[b]}
800 m freestyle	8:08.41	Beijing	24 October 2014	NR
50 m backstroke	25.95	Copenhagen	16 December 2017	NR
100 m backstroke	55.03	Doha	4 December 2014	ER^{[a]}
200 m backstroke	1:59.23	Doha	5 December 2014	ER^{[a]}
200 m butterfly	2:01.12	Doha	3 December 2014	NR
200 m breaststroke	2:20.63	Kaposvár	13 December 2019	^{[b]}
100 m IM	56.51	Berlin	7 August 2017	NR^{[a]}
200 m IM	2:01.86	Doha	6 December 2014	NR^{[a]}
400 m IM	4:19.46 (h)	Netanya	2 December 2015	NR^{[a]}

=== Short course yards ===
Event	Time	Location	Date	Notes
200 yd IM	1:51.80	Auburn	15 March 2012	
400 yd IM	3:56.54	Auburn	16 March 2012	^{[c]}

=== Notes ===
^{a} Former World record.
^{b} Former Hungarian record.
^{c} Former U.S. Open record.

== International championships (50 m) ==
Meet	100 free	200 free	400 free	50 back	100 back	200 back	100 fly	200 fly	200 medley	400 medley	4×100 free	4×200 free	4×100 medley
OG 2004		31st											
WC 2005													
EC 2006		15th	8th						9th	DSQ(h)		8th	
WC 2007		25th							12th	11th			
EC 2008	49th		22nd						6th	2nd place, silver medalist(s)		6th	
OG 2008									17th	12th			
WC 2009								3rd place, bronze medalist(s)	3rd place, bronze medalist(s)	1st place, gold medalist(s)	8th	6th	14th
EC 2010								1st place, gold medalist(s)	1st place, gold medalist(s)	2nd place, silver medalist(s)	4th	1st place, gold medalist(s)	
WC 2011								19th	6th	15th		5th	
EC 2012								1st place, gold medalist(s)	1st place, gold medalist(s)	1st place, gold medalist(s)	4th	2nd place, silver medalist(s)	6th
OG 2012								9th	8th	4th		9th	
WC 2013		9th			h^{[a]}	6th		3rd place, bronze medalist(s)	1st place, gold medalist(s)	1st place, gold medalist(s)			
EC 2014	sf^{[b]}	2nd place, silver medalist(s)		15th	1st place, gold medalist(s)	16th	h^{[a]}	3rd place, bronze medalist(s)	1st place, gold medalist(s)	1st place, gold medalist(s)		3rd place, bronze medalist(s)	
WC 2015		5th			h^{[a]}	3rd place, bronze medalist(s)		13th	1st place, gold medalist(s)	1st place, gold medalist(s)			
EC 2016					2nd place, silver medalist(s)	1st place, gold medalist(s)			1st place, gold medalist(s)	1st place, gold medalist(s)		1st place, gold medalist(s)	
OG 2016					1st place, gold medalist(s)	2nd place, silver medalist(s)			1st place, gold medalist(s)	1st place, gold medalist(s)		6th	
WC 2017		7th			h^{[a]}	2nd place, silver medalist(s)		3rd place, bronze medalist(s)	1st place, gold medalist(s)	1st place, gold medalist(s)		6th	
EC 2018					4th				1st place, gold medalist(s)				8th
WC 2019		17th				8th			1st place, gold medalist(s)	1st place, gold medalist(s)		6th	
EC 2020								2nd place, silver medalist(s)	3rd place, bronze medalist(s)	1st place, gold medalist(s)			
OG 2020						20th			7th	5th			
WC 2022								13th	7th	4th			
EC 2022									8th			3rd place, bronze medalist(s)	

^{a} Hosszú qualified from the heats, but scratched the semi-finals
^{b} Hosszú qualified from the semi-finals, but scratched the final

== See also ==
- World record progression 100 metres backstroke
- World record progression 200 metres backstroke
- World record progression 100 metres individual medley
- World record progression 200 metres individual medley
- World record progression 400 metres individual medley
- List of European Aquatics Championships medalists in swimming (women)
- List of European Short Course Swimming Championships medalists (women)
- List of World Aquatics Championships medalists in swimming (women)

Awards
Preceded by Ildikó Mincza-Nébald; Éva Risztov; Danuta Kozák	Hungarian Sportswoman of The Year; 2009; 2013 – 2017; 2019	Succeeded by Natasa Dusev-Janics; Danuta Kozák; Hedvig Karakas
Preceded by Ranomi Kromowidjojo; Sarah Sjöström; Sarah Sjöström	European Swimmer of the Year; 2013, 2014; 2016; 2019	Succeeded by Sarah Sjöström; Sarah Sjöström; Sarah Sjöström
Preceded by Katie Ledecky; Sarah Sjöström	FINA Swimmer of the Year; 2014 – 2016; 2018	Succeeded by Sarah Sjöström; Sarah Sjöström
Records
Preceded by Julia Smit	Women's 200 metre individual medley world record holder (short course); 7 August 2013 – 10 December 2024	Succeeded by Kate Douglass
Preceded by Hinkelien Schreuder	Women's 100 metre individual medley world record holder (short course); 8 August 2013 – 18 October 2024	Succeeded by Gretchen Walsh
Preceded by Julia Smit; Mireia Belmonte	Women's 400 metre individual medley world record holder (short course); 11 August 2013 – 3 December 2014; 2 December 2015 – 12 August 2017	Succeeded by Mireia Belmonte; Mireia Belmonte
Preceded by Shiho Sakai	Women's 100 backstroke world record holder (short course); 4 December 2014 – 27 October 2019	Succeeded by Minna Atherton
Preceded by Missy Franklin	Women's 200 backstroke world record holder (short course); 5 December 2014 – 28 November 2020	Succeeded by Kaylee McKeown
Preceded by Ariana Kukors	Women's 200 metre individual medley world record holder (long course); 3 August 2015 – 9 June 2025	Succeeded by Summer McIntosh
Preceded by Ye Shiwen	Women's 400 metre individual medley world record holder (long course); 6 August 2016 – 1 April 2023	Succeeded by Summer McIntosh
Sporting positions
Preceded by Therese Alshammar	Female World Cup Overall Winner; 2012, 2013, 2014, 2015, 2016	Succeeded by Sarah Sjöström
