= Zhou Min =

Chinese swimmer (born 1997)

Personal information
- Nationality: Chinese
- Born: 16 December 1997 (age 28) Shanghai, China
- Height: 1.72 m (5 ft 8 in)

Sport
- Sport: Swimming

Zhou Min (born 16 December 1997) is a Chinese swimmer. She competed in the women's 400 metre individual medley event at the 2016 Summer Olympics held in Rio de Janeiro, Brazil.
