= List of World Championships records in swimming =

Below is a list of current championship (or "meet") records for the two World Championships in swimming:

- the swimming events of the World Aquatics Championships, held in a long course (50 meter) pool.
- World Aquatics Swimming Championships (25m), at which swimming is the only discipline. This meet is held in a short course (25 meter) pool.

Both events are organized by the international governing body for aquatics, World Aquatics (formerly known as FINA). These are the fastest times ever swum at any edition of the meet.

== Long course (50 m) ==
=== Men ===
| Event | Time | | Name | Nationality | Date | Meet | Location | Ref |
|---|---|---|---|---|---|---|---|---|
| 50 m freestyle | 21.04 | | Caeleb Dressel | United States | 27 July 2019 | 2019 World Championships | Gwangju, South Korea | |
| 100 m freestyle | 46.51 | ER | David Popovici | Romania | 31 July 2025 | 2025 World Championships | Singapore, Singapore | |
| 200 m freestyle | 1:42.00 | WR | Paul Biedermann | Germany | 28 July 2009 | 2009 World Championships | Rome, Italy | |
| 400 m freestyle | 3:40.07 | | Paul Biedermann | Germany | 26 July 2009 | 2009 World Championships | Rome, Italy | |
| 800 m freestyle | 7:32.12 | WR | Zhang Lin | China | 29 July 2009 | 2009 World Championships | Rome, Italy | |
| 1500 m freestyle | 14:31.54 | AF | Ahmed Hafnaoui | Tunisia | 30 July 2023 | 2023 World Championships | Fukuoka, Japan | |
| 50 m backstroke | 23.68 | | Kliment Kolesnikov | Neutral Athletes B | 3 August 2025 | 2025 World Championships | Singapore, Singapore | |
| 100 m backstroke | 51.60 | WR | Thomas Ceccon | Italy | 20 June 2022 | 2022 World Championships | Budapest, Hungary | |
| 200 m backstroke | 1:51.92 | WR | Aaron Peirsol | United States | 31 July 2009 | 2009 World Championships | Rome, Italy | |
| 50 m breaststroke | 25.95 | sf, WR | Adam Peaty | Great Britain | 25 July 2017 | 2017 World Championships | Budapest, Hungary | |
| 100 m breaststroke | 56.88 | sf, WR | Adam Peaty | Great Britain | 21 July 2019 | 2019 World Championships | Gwangju, South Korea | |
| 200 m breaststroke | 2:05.48 | WR | Qin Haiyang | China | 28 July 2023 | 2019 World Championships | Fukuoka, Japan | |
| 50 m butterfly | 22.35 | AM | Caeleb Dressel | United States | 22 July 2019 | 2019 World Championships | Gwangju, South Korea | |
| 100 m butterfly | 49.50 | sf | Caeleb Dressel | United States | 26 July 2019 | 2019 World Championships | Gwangju, South Korea | |
| 200 m butterfly | 1:50.34 | WR | Kristóf Milák | Hungary | 21 June 2022 | 2022 World Championships | Budapest, Hungary | |
| 200 m individual medley | 1:52.69 | sf, WR | Léon Marchand | France | 30 July 2025 | 2025 World Championships | Singapore, Singapore | |
| 400 m individual medley | 4:02.50 | WR | Léon Marchand | France | 23 July 2023 | 2023 World Championships | Fukuoka, Japan | |
| 4 × 100 m freestyle relay | 3:08.97 | OC | Flynn Southam (47.77); Kai Taylor (47.04); Maximillian Giuliani (47.63); Kyle Chalmers (46.53) | Australia | 27 July 2025 | 2025 World Championships | Singapore, Singapore | |
| 4 × 200 m freestyle relay | 6:58.55 | WR | Michael Phelps (1:44.49); Ricky Berens (1:44.13); David Walters (1:45.47); Ryan Lochte (1:44.46) | United States | 31 July 2009 | 2009 World Championships | Rome, Italy | |
| 4 × 100 m medley relay | 3:26.93 | ER | Miron Lifintsev (52.44); Kirill Prigoda (57.92); Andrei Minakov (50.17); Egor Kornev (46.40) | Neutral Athletes B | 3 August 2025 | 2025 World Championships | Singapore, Singapore | |

Legend: # – Record awaiting ratification by World Aquatics; WR – World record; AF – African record; AM – Americas record; ER – European record; OC – Oceanian record;
Records not set in finals: h – heat; sf – semifinal; r – relay 1st leg; rh – relay heat 1st leg; so – swim-off

=== Women ===
| Event | Time | | Name | Nationality | Date | Meet | Location | Ref |
|---|---|---|---|---|---|---|---|---|
| 50 m freestyle | 23.61 | sf, ER | Sarah Sjöström | Sweden | 29 July 2023 | 2023 World Championships | Fukuoka, Japan | |
| 100 m freestyle | 51.71 | r | Sarah Sjöström | Sweden | 23 July 2017 | 2017 World Championships | Budapest, Hungary | |
| 200 m freestyle | 1:52.85 | | Mollie O'Callaghan | Australia | 26 July 2023 | 2023 World Championships | Fukuoka, Japan | |
| 400 m freestyle | 3:55.38 | OC | Ariarne Titmus | Australia | 23 July 2023 | 2023 World Championships | Fukuoka, Japan | |
| 800 m freestyle | 8:05.62 | | Katie Ledecky | United States | 2 August 2025 | 2025 World Championships | Singapore, Singapore | |
| 1500 m freestyle | 15:25.48 | | Katie Ledecky | United States | 4 August 2015 | 2015 World Championships | Kazan, Russia | |
| 50 m backstroke | 27.06 | | Zhao Jing | China | 30 July 2009 | 2009 World Championships | Rome, Italy | |
| 100 m backstroke | 57.16 | OC | Kaylee McKeown | Australia | 29 July 2025 | 2025 World Championships | Singapore, Singapore | |
| 200 m backstroke | 2:03.33 | | Kaylee McKeown | Australia | 2 August 2025 | 2025 World Championships | Singapore, Singapore | |
| 50 m breaststroke | 29.16 | WR | Rūta Meilutytė | Lithuania | 30 July 2023 | 2023 World Championships | Fukuoka, Japan | |
| 100 m breaststroke | 1:04.13 | WR | Lilly King | United States | 25 July 2017 | 2017 World Championships | Budapest, Hungary | |
| 200 m breaststroke | 2:18.50 | AM | Kate Douglass | United States | 1 August 2025 | 2025 World Championships | Singapore, Singapore | |
| 50 m butterfly | 24.60 | | Sarah Sjöström | Sweden | 29 July 2017 | 2017 World Championships | Budapest, Hungary | |
| 100 m butterfly | 54.73 | | Gretchen Walsh | United States | 28 July 2025 | 2025 World Championships | Singapore, Singapore | |
| 200 m butterfly | 2:01.99 | | Summer McIntosh | Canada | 31 July 2025 | 2025 World Championships | Singapore, Singapore | |
| 200 m individual medley | 2:06.12 | ER | Katinka Hosszú | Hungary | 3 August 2015 | 2015 World Championships | Kazan, Russia | |
| 400 m individual medley | 4:25.78 | | Summer McIntosh | Canada | 3 August 2025 | 2025 World Championships | Singapore, Singapore | |
| 4 × 100 m freestyle relay | 3:27.96 | WR | Mollie O'Callaghan (52.08); Shayna Jack (51.69); Meg Harris (52.29); Emma McKeon (51.90) | Australia | 23 July 2023 | 2023 World Championships | Fukuoka, Japan | |
| 4 × 200 m freestyle relay | 7:37.50 | WR | Mollie O'Callaghan (1:53.66); Shayna Jack (1:55.63); Brianna Throssell (1:55.80); Ariarne Titmus (1:52.41) | Australia | 27 July 2023 | 2023 World Championships | Fukuoka, Japan | |
| 4 × 100 m medley relay | 3:49.34 | WR | Regan Smith (57.57); Kate Douglass (1:04.27); Gretchen Walsh (54.98); Torri Huske (52.52) | United States | 3 August 2025 | 2025 World Championships | Singapore, Singapore | |

Legend: # – Record awaiting ratification by World Aquatics; WR – World record; AF – African record; AM – Americas record; ER – European record; OC – Oceanian record;
Records not set in finals: h – heat; sf – semifinal; r – relay 1st leg; rh – relay heat 1st leg; so – swim-off

=== Mixed relay ===
| Event | Time | | Name | Nationality | Date | Meet | Location | Ref |
|---|---|---|---|---|---|---|---|---|
| 4 × 100 m freestyle relay | 3:18.48 | WR | Jack Alexy (46.91); Patrick Sammon (46.70); Kate Douglass (52.43); Torri Huske (52.44) | United States | 2 August 2025 | 2025 World Championships | Singapore, Singapore | |
| 4 × 100 m medley relay | 3:37.97 | | Miron Lifintsev (51.78); Kirill Prigoda (57.56); Daria Klepikova (55.97); Daria Trofimova (52.66) | Neutral Athletes B | 30 July 2025 | 2025 World Championships | Singapore, Singapore | |

Legend: # – Record awaiting ratification by World Aquatics; WR – World record; AF – African record; AM – Americas record; ER – European record; OC – Oceanian record;
Records not set in finals: h – heat; so – swim-off

== Short course (25 m) ==
=== Men ===
| Event | Time | | Name | Nationality | Date | Meet | Location | Ref |
|---|---|---|---|---|---|---|---|---|
| 50 m freestyle | 19.90 | sf, WR | Jordan Crooks | Cayman Islands | 14 December 2024 | 2024 World Championships | Budapest, Hungary | |
| 100 m freestyle | 44.95 | h, AM | Jordan Crooks | Cayman Islands | 11 December 2024 | 2024 World Championships | Budapest, Hungary | |
| 200 m freestyle | 1:38.61 | WR | Luke Hobson | United States | 15 December 2024 | 2024 World Championships | Budapest, Hungary | |
| 400 m freestyle | 3:34.01 | | Danas Rapšys | Lithuania | 11 December 2018 | 2018 World Championships | Hangzhou, China | |
| 800 m freestyle | 7:29.99 | | Gregorio Paltrinieri | Italy | 17 December 2022 | 2022 World Championships | Melbourne, Australia | |
| 1500 m freestyle | 14:06.88 | WR | Florian Wellbrock | Germany | 21 December 2021 | 2021 World Championships | Abu Dhabi, United Arab Emirates | |
| 50 m backstroke | 22.22 | | Florent Manaudou | France | 6 December 2014 | 2014 World Championships | Doha, Qatar | |
| 100 m backstroke | 48.50 | | Ryan Murphy | United States | 14 December 2022 | 2022 World Championships | Melbourne, Australia | |
| 200 m backstroke | 1:45.65 | | Hubert Kós | Hungary | 15 December 2024 | 2024 World Championships | Budapest, Hungary | |
| 50 m breaststroke | 25.38 | AM | Nic Fink | United States | 18 December 2022 | 2022 World Championships | Melbourne, Australia | |
| 100 m breaststroke | 55.47 | AS | Qin Haiyang | China | 12 December 2024 | 2024 World Championships | Budapest, Hungary | |
| 200 m breaststroke | 2:00.16 | | Kirill Prigoda | Russia | 13 December 2018 | 2018 World Championships | Hangzhou, China | |
| 50 m butterfly | 21.32 | WR | Noè Ponti | Switzerland | 11 December 2024 | 2024 World Championships | Budapest, Hungary | |
| 100 m butterfly | 47.71 | ER | Noè Ponti | Switzerland | 14 December 2024 | 2024 World Championships | Budapest, Hungary | |
| 200 m butterfly | 1:48.24 | = | Daiya Seto | Japan | 11 December 2018 | 2018 World Championships | Hangzhou, China | |
| 200 m butterfly | 1:48.24 | =, AM | Ilya Kharun | Canada | 12 December 2024 | 2024 World Championships | Budapest, Hungary | |
| 100 m individual medley | 50.33 | | Noè Ponti | Switzerland | 13 December 2024 | 2024 World Championships | Budapest, Hungary | |
| 200 m individual medley | 1:49.51 | | Shaine Casas | United States | 10 December 2024 | 2024 World Championships | Budapest, Hungary | |
| 400 m individual medley | 3:55.50 | AM | Ryan Lochte | United States | 16 December 2010 | 2010 World Championships | Dubai, United Arab Emirates | |
| 4 × 50 m freestyle relay | 1:21.80 | WR | Caeleb Dressel (20.43); Ryan Held (20.25); Jack Conger (20.59); Michael Chadwick (20.53) | United States | 14 December 2018 | 2018 World Championships | Hangzhou, China | |
| 4 × 100 m freestyle relay | 3:01.66 | WR | Jack Alexy (45.05); Luke Hobson (45.18); Kieran Smith (46.01); Chris Guiliano (45.42) | United States | 10 December 2024 | 2024 World Championships | Budapest, Hungary | |
| 4 × 200 m freestyle relay | 6:40.51 | WR | Luke Hobson (1:38.91); Carson Foster (1:40.77); Shaine Casas (1:40.34); Kieran Smith (1:40.49) | United States | 13 December 2024 | 2024 World Championships | Budapest, Hungary | |
| 4 × 50 m medley relay | 1:29.72 | WR | Lorenzo Mora (22.65); Nicolò Martinenghi (24.95); Matteo Rivolta (21.60); Leonardo Deplano (20.52) | Italy | 17 December 2022 | 2022 World Championships | Melbourne, Australia | |
| 4 × 100 m medley relay | 3:18.68 | WR | Miron Lifintsev (49.31); Kirill Prigoda (55.15); Andrei Minakov (48.80); Egor Kornev (45.42) | Neutral Athletes B | 15 December 2024 | 2024 World Championships | Budapest, Hungary | |

Legend: # – Record awaiting ratification by World Aquatics; WR – World record; AF – African record; AM – Americas record; AS – Asian record; ER – European record; OC – Oceanian record;
Records not set in finals: h – heat; sf – semifinal; r – relay 1st leg; rh – relay heat 1st leg; so – swim-off

=== Women ===
| Event | Time | | Name | Nationality | Date | Meet | Location | Ref |
|---|---|---|---|---|---|---|---|---|
| 50 m freestyle | 22.83 | WR | Gretchen Walsh | United States | 15 December 2024 | 2024 World Championships | Budapest, Hungary | |
| 100 m freestyle | 50.31 | | Gretchen Walsh | United States | 12 December 2024 | 2024 World Championships | Budapest, Hungary | |
| 200 m freestyle | 1:50.31 | AS | Siobhán Haughey | Hong Kong | 16 December 2021 | 2021 World Championships | Abu Dhabi, United Arab Emirates | |
| 400 m freestyle | 3:50.25 | WR | Summer McIntosh | Canada | 10 December 2024 | 2024 World Championships | Budapest, Hungary | |
| 800 m freestyle | 8:01.95 | | Lani Pallister | Australia | 11 December 2024 | 2024 World Championships | Budapest, Hungary | |
| 1500 m freestyle | 15:21.43 | | Lani Pallister | Australia | 16 December 2022 | 2022 World Championships | Melbourne, Australia | |
| 50 m backstroke | 25.23 | WR | Regan Smith | United States | 13 December 2024 | 2024 World Championships | Budapest, Hungary | |
| 100 m backstroke | 54.02 | r, =WR | Regan Smith | United States | 15 December 2024 | 2024 World Championships | Budapest, Hungary | |
| 200 m backstroke | 1:58.04 | | Regan Smith | United States | 15 December 2024 | 2024 World Championships | Budapest, Hungary | |
| 50 m breaststroke | 28.37 | sf, WR | Rūta Meilutytė | Lithuania | 17 December 2022 | 2022 World Championships | Melbourne, Australia | |
| 100 m breaststroke | 1:02.36 | =WR | Alia Atkinson | Jamaica | 6 December 2014 | 2014 World Championships | Doha, Qatar | |
| 200 m breaststroke | 2:12.50 | WR | Kate Douglass | United States | 13 December 2024 | 2024 World Championships | Budapest, Hungary | |
| 50 m butterfly | 23.94 | sf | Gretchen Walsh | United States | 10 December 2024 | 2024 World Championships | Budapest, Hungary | |
| 100 m butterfly | 52.71 | WR | Gretchen Walsh | United States | 14 December 2024 | 2024 World Championships | Budapest, Hungary | |
| 200 m butterfly | 1:59.32 | WR | Summer McIntosh | Canada | 12 December 2024 | 2024 World Championships | Budapest, Hungary | |
| 100 m individual medley | 55.11 | WR | Gretchen Walsh | United States | 13 December 2024 | 2024 World Championships | Budapest, Hungary | |
| 200 m individual medley | 2:01.63 | WR | Kate Douglass | United States | 10 December 2024 | 2024 World Championships | Budapest, Hungary | |
| 400 m individual medley | 4:15.48 | WR | Summer McIntosh | Canada | 14 December 2024 | 2024 World Championships | Budapest, Hungary | |
| 4 × 50 m freestyle relay | 1:33.89 | AM | Torri Huske (24.08); Claire Curzan (23.30); Erika Brown (23.74); Kate Douglass (22.77) | United States | 15 December 2022 | 2022 World Championships | Melbourne, Australia | |
| 4 × 100 m freestyle relay | 3:25.01 | WR | Kate Douglass (50.95); Katharine Berkoff (51.38); Alex Shackell (52.01); Gretchen Walsh (50.67) | United States | 10 December 2024 | 2024 World Championships | Budapest, Hungary | |
| 4 × 200 m freestyle relay | 7:30.13 | WR | Alex Walsh (1:53.25); Paige Madden (1:53.18); Katie Grimes (1:53.39); Claire Weinstein (1:50.31) | United States | 12 December 2024 | 2024 World Championships | Budapest, Hungary | |
| 4 × 50 m medley relay | 1:42.35 | WR | Mollie O'Callaghan (25.49); Chelsea Hodges (29.11); Emma Mckeon (24.43); Madison Wilson (23.32) | Australia | 17 December 2022 | 2022 World Championships | Melbourne, Australia | |
| 4 × 100 m medley relay | 3:40.41 | WR | Regan Smith (54.02); Lilly King (1:03.02); Gretchen Walsh (52.84); Kate Douglass (50.53) | United States | 15 December 2024 | 2024 World Championships | Budapest, Hungary | |

Legend: # – Record awaiting ratification by World Aquatics; WR – World record; AF – African record; AM – Americas record; ER – European record; OC – Oceanian record;
Records not set in finals: h – heat; sf – semifinal; r – relay 1st leg; rh – relay heat 1st leg; so – swim-off

=== Mixed relay ===
| Event | Time | | Name | Club | Date | Meet | Location | Ref |
|---|---|---|---|---|---|---|---|---|
| 4 × 50 m freestyle relay | 1:27.33 | WR | Maxime Grousset (20.92); Florent Manaudou (20.26); Béryl Gastaldello (23.00); Mélanie Henique (23.15) | France | 16 December 2022 | 2022 World Championships | Melbourne, Australia | |
| 4 × 50 m medley relay | 1:35.15 | WR | Ryan Murphy (22.37); Nic Fink (24.96); Kate Douglass (24.09); Torri Huske (23.73) | United States | 14 December 2022 | 2022 World Championships | Melbourne, Australia | |

Legend: # – Record awaiting ratification by World Aquatics; WR – World record; AF – African record; AM – Americas record; ER – European record; OC – Oceanian record;
Records not set in finals: h – heat; so – swim-off
