= Swimming at the 2022 Commonwealth Games – Women's 200 metre individual medley =

Swimming event

Women's 200 metre individual medley at the 2022 Commonwealth Games
- Venue: Sandwell Aquatics Centre
- Dates: 1 August
- Competitors: 13 from 8 nations
- Winning time: 2:08.70

Medalists
gold medal	Summer McIntosh	Canada
silver medal	Kaylee McKeown	Australia
bronze medal	Abbie Wood	England

The women's 200 metre individual medley event at the 2022 Commonwealth Games was held on 1 August at the Sandwell Aquatics Centre.

== Records ==
Prior to this competition, the existing world, Commonwealth and Games records were as follows:

World record	Katinka Hosszú (HUN)	2:06.12	Kazan, Russia	3 August 2015
Commonwealth record	Siobhan-Marie O'Connor (GBR)	2:06.88	Rio de Janeiro, Brazil	9 August 2016
Games record	Siobhan-Marie O'Connor (ENG)	2:08.21	Glasgow, United Kingdom	27 July 2014

== Schedule ==
The schedule is as follows:

All times are British Summer Time (UTC+1)

Date	Time	Round
Monday 1 August 2022	11:27	Qualifying
Monday 1 August 2022	20:08	Final

== Results ==
=== Heats ===
Rank	Heat	Lane	Name	Nationality	Time	Notes
1	2	3	Summer McIntosh	Canada	2:12.12	Q
2	2	2	Rebecca Meder	South Africa	2:12.57	Q
3	1	5	Mary-Sophie Harvey	Canada	2:13.18	Q
4	1	4	Abbie Wood	England	2:13.24	Q
4	1	6	Abbey Harkin	Australia	2:13.24	Q
6	1	3	Ella Ramsay	Australia	2:14.03	Q
7	2	4	Kaylee McKeown	Australia	2:14.23	Q
8	2	5	Alicia Wilson	England	2:14.89	Q
9	1	2	Katie Shanahan	Scotland	2:15.12	R
10	2	6	Helena Gasson	New Zealand	2:15.49	R
11	2	7	Mya Rasmussen	New Zealand	2:16.03	
12	2	1	Grace Davison	Northern Ireland	2:22.34	
13	2	8	Adara Stoddard	Barbados	2:34.33	
	1	1	Mollie McAlorum	Northern Ireland	DNS	
	1	7	Quah Jing Wen	Singapore	DNS	
	1	8	Jamie Joachim	Saint Vincent and the Grenadines	DNS	

=== Final ===
Rank	Lane	Name	Nationality	Time	Notes
1st place, gold medalist(s)	4	Summer McIntosh	Canada	2:08.70	WJR
2nd place, silver medalist(s)	1	Kaylee McKeown	Australia	2:09.52	
3rd place, bronze medalist(s)	6	Abbie Wood	England	2:10.68	
4	5	Rebecca Meder	South Africa	2:12.01	
5	2	Abbey Harkin	Australia	2:12.25	
6	3	Mary-Sophie Harvey	Canada	2:12.48	
7	8	Alicia Wilson	England	2:14.08	
8	7	Ella Ramsay	Australia	2:14.71	
