= Summer McIntosh =

Canadian swimmer (born 2006)

Summer McIntosh OLY
Personal information
- National team: Canada
- Born: August 18, 2006 (age 20) Toronto, Ontario, Canada
- Height: 1.73 m (5 ft 8 in)

Sport
- Sport: Swimming
- Strokes: Freestyle, butterfly, backstroke, individual medley
- Club: HPC Ontario- Toronto (2020–2022); Sarasota Sharks – Sarasota, Florida (2022–2025); University of Texas at Austin (from 2025)
- Coach: Ben Titley, Ryan Malette (2020–2022); Brent Arckey (2022–2025); Fred Vergnoux (2025); Bob Bowman (from 2025)
Medal record
Women's swimming
Representing Canada
Event	1st	2nd	3rd
Olympic Games	3	1	0
World Championships (LC)	8	1	4
World Championships (SC)	4	3	1
Commonwealth Games	2	3	1
Pan Pacific Championships	1	2	1
Total	18	10	7
Event	1st	2nd	3rd
200 m backstroke	0	1	0
200 m butterfly	5	0	0
200 m medley	3	1	0
400 m medley	7	0	0
200 m freestyle	0	1	1
400 m freestyle	2	4	0
800 m freestyle	0	0	1
4x100 m medley	0	2	1
4x100 m freestyle	0	0	2
4x200 m freestyle	1	1	2
Total	18	10	7
Olympic Games Olympic Games
Gold medal – first place	2024 Paris	200 m butterfly
Gold medal – first place	2024 Paris	200 m medley
Gold medal – first place	2024 Paris	400 m medley
Silver medal – second place	2024 Paris	400 m freestyle
World Championships (LC)
Gold medal – first place	2022 Budapest	200 m butterfly
Gold medal – first place	2022 Budapest	400 m medley
Gold medal – first place	2023 Fukuoka	200 m butterfly
Gold medal – first place	2023 Fukuoka	400 m medley
Gold medal – first place	2025 Singapore	400 m freestyle
Gold medal – first place	2025 Singapore	200 m butterfly
Gold medal – first place	2025 Singapore	200 m medley
Gold medal – first place	2025 Singapore	400 m medley
Silver medal – second place	2022 Budapest	400 m freestyle
Bronze medal – third place	2022 Budapest	4×200 m freestyle
Bronze medal – third place	2023 Fukuoka	200 m freestyle
Bronze medal – third place	2023 Fukuoka	4×100 m medley
Bronze medal – third place	2025 Singapore	800 m freestyle
World Championships (SC)
Gold medal – first place	2021 Abu Dhabi	4×200 m freestyle
Gold medal – first place	2024 Budapest	400 m freestyle
Gold medal – first place	2024 Budapest	200 m butterfly
Gold medal – first place	2024 Budapest	400 m medley
Silver medal – second place	2021 Abu Dhabi	400 m freestyle
Silver medal – second place	2021 Abu Dhabi	4×100 m medley
Silver medal – second place	2024 Budapest	200 m backstroke
Bronze medal – third place	2024 Budapest	4×100 m freestyle
Commonwealth Games
Gold medal – first place	2022 Birmingham	200 m medley
Gold medal – first place	2022 Birmingham	400 m medley
Silver medal – second place	2022 Birmingham	400 m freestyle
Silver medal – second place	2022 Birmingham	4×100 m medley
Silver medal – second place	2022 Birmingham	4×200 m freestyle
Bronze medal – third place	2022 Birmingham	4×100 m freestyle
Pan Pacific Championships
Gold medal – first place	2026 Irvine	400 m medley
Silver medal – second place	2026 Irvine	200 m freestyle
Silver medal – second place	2026 Irvine	200 m medley
Bronze medal – third place	2026 Irvine	4×200 m freestyle

Summer Ann McIntosh OLY (born August 18, 2006) is a Canadian competitive swimmer. She is a three-time Olympic champion, eight-time World Aquatics champion, and two-time Commonwealth Games gold medallist. Noted for her strength in medley, freestyle and butterfly events, she is the world record holder in the 200 meter butterfly, 200 and 400 meter individual medley and 400 meter freestyle. In the short course pool, she is a four-time World Swimming Championships gold medallist and holds world records in the 400 metre freestyle, 200 metre butterfly, and 400 metre individual medley events.

McIntosh first drew international recognition when, at age 14, she was the youngest member of the Canadian team for the 2020 Summer Olympics, where she achieved a fourth-place finish in the 400 meter freestyle. The following year she became the youngest World Aquatics champion in swimming in over a decade, and the first Canadian to win two gold medals at a single World Championships, for which she was dubbed a "teen swimming sensation."

In March and April 2023, in the span of five days, McIntosh set her first and second world records, in the 400 meter freestyle and 400 individual medley events, at the Canadian national trials. McIntosh's performance at the 2024 Summer Olympics, in which she won four individual medals (three gold and one silver), further increased her fame, with Time dubbing it the "Summer of Summer".

Accolades bestowed upon McIntosh include the Northern Star Award as the top Canadian athlete of 2024, three consecutive Bobbie Rosenfeld Awards as The Canadian Press' choice for Canadian female athlete of the year (2023–2025), and two World Aquatics Female Swimmer of the Year honours (2024–2025).

== Early life ==
McIntosh is the daughter of Greg McIntosh and former Canadian Olympic swimmer Jill Horstead. She and her older sister, Brooke McIntosh, both competed in swimming and figure skating in their early childhood. Brooke went on to become a competitive pair skater, while McIntosh dropped figure skating in favour of swimming.

== Career ==
In her time as a junior swimmer, McIntosh broke over 50 Canadian national Age Group Records. In May 2021, McIntosh swam a 4:05.13 in the 400 meter freestyle, the fastest time ever recorded worldwide by a 14-year-old female swimmer.

=== 2021 season ===
As part of the 2021 Canadian Olympic swimming trials in Toronto, McIntosh won the 200 meter freestyle event over training partner Penny Oleksiak, with a personal best time of 1:56.19, which also marked the fastest time ever by a 14-year-old swimmer worldwide. This qualified her for the 2020 Summer Olympics in Tokyo. McIntosh followed this up with a win in the 800 meter freestyle event, in another personal best time of 8:29.49. She was the youngest person named to the Canadian Olympic team.

==== Summer Olympic Games ====
In her first event, McIntosh finished fourth in the 400 meter freestyle, breaking the Canadian national record with a time of 4:02.42. She advanced to the semifinals of the women's 200m freestyle, but placed ninth there and thus missed the final. She was part of the Canadian team for the 4 × 200 meter relay, along with Oleksiak, Rebecca Smith and Kayla Sanchez. They set a new Canadian record in the event final, placing fourth. McIntosh's last event was the 800 metre freestyle, where she placed eleventh and thus did not advance to the final. Following the Olympics, McIntosh made her debut in the International Swimming League as part of the Toronto Titans.

==== World Swimming Championships ====
2021 World Swimming Championships
Gold medal – first place	4×200 m freestyle	7:32.96 (NR)
Silver medal – second place	400 m freestyle	3:57.87
Silver medal – second place	4×100 m medley (prelims)	3:47.36 (NR)

McIntosh was part of the Canadian team for the 2021 World Swimming Championships in Abu Dhabi, and won a silver medal as part of the 4×100 metre medley relay, where she swam in the preliminaries for Canada as the team finished in second in the final. She then helped the Canadian team in the 4×200 metre freestyle relay, swimming the first leg as Canada won gold. McIntosh won her first individual medal of the competition when she won the silver in the 400 metre freestyle race. She was third at the halfway mark but passed Siobhán Haughey and held on to the second position, finishing behind Li Bingjie. McIntosh had set a Canadian record in the 800 metre freestyle heats, but she withdrew from the event to focus on the 400 and women's relay events.

=== 2022 season ===
On March 4, 2022, McIntosh swam the 400 metre individual medley at a preparatory event for the Canadian swimming trials, recording a time of 4:29.12. This was both a national and Commonwealth record, and the third-fastest of all time, as well as the fastest time recorded by any swimmer since Katinka Hosszú's winning time at the 2016 Summer Olympics. At the national swimming trials, McIntosh won titles in the 200 metre and 400 metre freestyle, the 200 metre butterfly, and the 400 metre individual medley, before scratching from the 800 metre freestyle.

==== World Championships ====
2022 World Championships
Gold medal – first place	200 m butterfly	2:05.20 (NR)
Gold medal – first place	400 m medley	4:32.04
Silver medal – second place	400 m freestyle	3:59.39 (NR)
Bronze medal – third place	4 × 200 m freestyle relay	7:44.76

McIntosh made her long course (50m) FINA World Aquatics Championships debut at the 2022 edition in Budapest, with her first event being the 400 metre freestyle. She finished second in the final, taking the silver medal with a new personal best and national record time of 3:59.39. She was only the fourth woman in history to record a time of under four minutes. McIntosh set another world junior record in the semi-final of the 200 metre butterfly with a 2:05.79 time, exceeding her own as-yet-unratified record from the Canadian swimming trials. She broke the record again the following day, June 22, in the event final, claiming her first World title, the first medal of any colour for Canada in the event. She was the first 15-year-old to win a World title since China's Ye Shiwen in 2011, and the youngest Canadian world champion in history, surpassing 18-year-old Victor Davis in 1982. Later in that same session, she participated in the event final of the 4 × 200 metre freestyle relay, breaking another junior world record with a 1:54.79 opening leg, the second-fastest of any woman in the event behind Katie Ledecky of the United States. The Canadian team won the bronze medal.

In her final event, the 400 metre individual medley, McIntosh won her second gold medal of the championships, beating American Katie Grimes by 0.63 seconds. She became the first Canadian swimmer to win two gold medals at a single World Championships, and set a new record for the most medals won by a Canadian at a single World Championships (4), which would be tied later that same day by Penny Oleksiak and Kayla Sanchez. Moreover, she was the youngest winner since Tracy Caulkins in 1978. McIntosh called the results "a dream come true", and praised Grimes, noting "she is around my age and she's a really tough competitor. So I'm looking forward to racing her and keep pushing myself."

==== Commonwealth Games ====
2022 Commonwealth Games
Gold medal – first place	200 m medley	2:08.70
Gold medal – first place	400 m medley	4:29.01 (CR, NR)
Silver medal – second place	400 m freestyle	3:59.32 (NR)
Silver medal – second place	4 × 200 m freestyle	7:51.98
Silver medal – second place	4 × 100 m medley	3:56.59
Bronze medal – third place	4 × 100 m freestyle	3:37.25

A month later, McIntosh was part of her first Commonwealth Games team, for the 2022 edition in Birmingham, England. She opted not to contest the 200 metre butterfly there, citing the need to focus on other events. Heavily favoured in the 400 m medley, she won gold on the first day of the competition schedule, improving her world junior, Commonwealth, and national records to 4:29.01. She finished 7.77 seconds ahead of silver medallist Kiah Melverton, and was the first Canadian gold medallist of the Games. McIntosh was then given the novel opportunity to participate in Canada's 4 × 100 metre freestyle relay team, with mainstay members like Oleksiak, Sanchez and Taylor Ruck absent, winning a bronze medal. She noted that she "didn't really know what to expect, the 100 free is not my main event so I just tried to put a good time down to set it up for the rest of the girls."

The next day, McIntosh took her more customary place on the 4 × 200 metre freestyle relay team, swimming the leadoff leg and helping take the silver medal. Of this, she said she was "very proud." On the fourth day, she competed in the 200 metre individual medley, a much more uncommon event for her than the 400 metre individual medley. McIntosh won the gold medal, defeating reigning World silver medallist Kaylee McKeown of Australia and setting a new world junior record. McIntosh noted that "the 200 IM is more of a sprinting event for me", adding "the only pressure I feel is what I put on myself. The only thing that matters is my expectations." With the result, McIntosh recorded one of the top four results of 2022 in five different events. On the final day of the swimming competitions, McIntosh won two more silver medals, finishing behind Ariarne Titmus in the 400 metre freestyle while lowering her own national record and then swimming the freestyle leg of the 4 × 100 metre medley relay, typically performed for the Canadian team by the absent Oleksiak.

Following the conclusion of the Commonwealth Games, Swimming World magazine, assessing her "vast talent on display at two championship-level events", opined "it's not hype and bluster anymore. Based purely on results from this year, not career medal totals or performance over a long stretch of time, McIntosh is the third-best female swimmer in the world." On October 28, at the 2022 FINA Swimming World Cup in Toronto, and conducted in short course metres, McIntosh set a new world junior record, World Cup record, Americas record, and Canadian record in the 400 metre freestyle on day one, finishing in a time of 3:52.80 in the final to win the gold medal. The following day, she won the gold medal in the 400 metre individual medley with a world junior record and Canadian record time of 4:21.49. She and fellow Canadians Sydney Pickrem and Bailey Andison won all the medals in the event. Approximately 50 minutes later, she placed eighth in the 100 metre backstroke with a time of 58.84 seconds. The following, and final, day, she won a pair of bronze medals, the first in the 200 metre backstroke with a personal best time of 2:02.85 and the second in the 200 metre individual medley with a personal best time of 2:06.57.

The next and final stop of the World Cup circuit, McIntosh won the gold medal in the 200 metre butterfly on November 3, finishing in a personal best time of 2:03.40, which was the only time in the final faster than 2:04.00. Day two, she finished in a personal best time of 1:52.63 in the 200 metre freestyle final to place fifth. On the third and final day, she dropped 6.25 seconds from her personal best time in the 800 metre freestyle to win the silver medal with a Canadian record time of 8:07.12. The following month, at the 2022 U.S. Open Swimming Championships, McIntosh won the gold medal in the 400 metre individual medley with a Championships record, world junior record, and US Open record time of 4:28.61. The following day, she won the silver medal in the 200 metre backstroke with a personal best time of 2:07.15, which was 1.87 seconds behind gold medallist Regan Smith of the United States. Earlier in the meet, on day two, she won the silver medal in the 400 metre freestyle.

=== 2023 season ===
McIntosh drew headlines early in 2023 with performances at the 2023 Pro Swim Series event in Fort Lauderdale, first lowering her national and world junior records in the 200 metre butterfly. Days later in the 200 metre freestyle event, she broke Taylor Ruck's national record and lowered her prior world junior record with a time of 1:54.13, and won the event over Katie Ledecky. This was the first time Ledecky had lost a domestic final in the 200 metre distance or higher since 2014. McIntosh remarked that "I'm really happy with that swim but it hurts really bad." She then broke Sydney Pickrem's national record in the 200 metre individual medley.

At the national swim trials at the end of March at the Toronto Pan Am Sports Centre, McIntosh set her first world record, winning the 400 metre freestyle event with a time of 3:56.08 seconds and surpassing Ariarne Titmus's prior time of 3:56.40. Speaking afterward, she said that "going into tonight, I didn't think the world record was a possibility, but you never know." Days later, McIntosh won the 400 metre medley with a time of 4:25.87, breaking the world record that Katinka Hosszú had set at the 2016 Summer Olympics. She became the first swimmer in history to hold both the 400m freestyle and 400m individual medley long course world records at the same time. McIntosh also improved her own world junior records in three other events at the meet.

==== World Championships ====
2023 World Championships
Gold medal – first place	200 m butterfly	2:04.06 (NR)
Gold medal – first place	400 m medley	4:27.11 (CR)
Bronze medal – third place	200 m freestyle	1:53.65 (NR)
Bronze medal – third place	4×100 m medley	3:54.12

McIntosh's first event of the 2023 World Aquatics Championships in Fukuoka was a highly-anticipated 400 metre freestyle, touted as a three-way contest between her, Titmus and Ledecky. She came third in the heats, but in the final she finished narrowly in fourth place, being overtaken for bronze in the final stretch by New Zealander Erika Fairweather. McIntosh called it a "learning experience." Later the same session she joined the Canadian team in the final of the 4×100 metre freestyle relay; with Oleksiak absent and Ruck recovering from a hand injury, the team finished seventh. McIntosh competed in the 200m freestyle at the World Championships for the first time, finishing second in the semi-finals, 0.03 back of Titmus and 0.24 ahead of Mollie O'Callaghan. She came third in the event final, out touching reigning Olympic silver medallist Siobhan Haughey for the bronze.

On July 27, McIntosh successfully defended her title in the 200m butterfly and improved on her world junior record in the event, claiming that she "was just trying to have as much fun as possible and race as hard as I could." She became only the second Canadian to win three World titles, after Kylie Masse, as well as the second to defend a World title, again after Masse. Later in the day she joined the Canadian team in the final of the 4×200 metre freestyle relay. The team, depleted of some of its most important members from years prior, finished in fifth, but McIntosh's 1:53.97 was the second-fastest in the event, behind Titmus, and the ninth-fastest of all time to that point. After finishing second in her heat for the 400m medley, McIntosh defended her title, winning in championship record time (4:27.11) and a margin of 4.30 seconds over repeat silver medallist Katie Grimes. In so doing, she broke her tie with Masse for sole possession of the record for Canadian World Aquatics titles. Later in the same session, she swam the freestyle leg of the 4×100 m medley relay, helping the team to a bronze medal. Her 53.48 time was an improvement by almost a second and a half over her performance in the earlier freestyle relay.

In her final major competition of the year, the 2023 U.S. Open Swimming Championships, McIntosh won the gold medal in the 400m freestyle race, defeating Ledecky and breaking the latter's championship record with a time of 3:59.42. She went on to defend her gold medal in the 400m individual medley, defeating Israeli silver medallist Anastasia Gorbenko by almost eight seconds. McIntosh was a finalist in voting for the Northern Star Award, given to the Canadian athlete of the year, and received the Bobbie Rosenfeld Award as the Canadian Press' choice for Canadian female athlete of the year.

=== 2024 season ===
As with most of the Canadian team's top swimmers, McIntosh opted not to attend the 2024 World Aquatics Championships in Doha, citing its proximity to the 2024 Summer Olympics. She drew headlines in early February when she defeated Katie Ledecky at a sectional event in Orlando, becoming the first person to outpace Ledecky in the 800 metre distance since 2010. Her 8:11.39 time broke a ten-year-old national record previously set by Brittany MacLean at the 2014 Pan Pacific Swimming Championships. At the inaugural edition of the Canadian Swimming Open in April, McIntosh won the 200m freestyle with a world-leading time of 1:54.21. She came in second in the 100m backstroke final later in the same session, finishing just behind Maggie Mac Neil. She would go on to win the 100m freestyle, 100m butterfly, and 200m individual medley.

McIntosh was the centre of attention at Canada's Olympic swimming trials, which featured audiences, unlike in the pandemic-afflicted 2021 events. On the first day, she won the 400m freestyle with a world-leading time that she nevertheless said she was "definitely not happy with". She then won the 200m freestyle on the second day. McIntosh drew headlines on the fourth day in the 400m individual medley, where she broke her own world record with a 4:24.38, an improvement of a second and a half. She finished more than fourteen seconds ahead of second-place Ella Jansen. In her fourth event of the trials, the 200m butterfly, she posted a world-leading time of 2:04.33. On the final day of the trials, McIntosh won the 200m individual medley, and was formally named to the Canadian Olympic team.

==== Summer Olympic Games ====
2024 Summer Olympics
Gold medal – first place	200 m butterfly	2:03.03 (OR, NR)
Gold medal – first place	200 m medley	2:06.56 (OR, NR)
Gold medal – first place	400 m medley	4:27.71
Silver medal – second place	400 m freestyle	3:58.37

McIntosh competed in the 400m freestyle, 400m individual medley, 200m butterfly, 200m individual medley, 4 × 100m freestyle relay, 4 × 200m freestyle relay, and the 4 × 100m medley relay at the Paris 2024 Olympics. The 400m freestyle was first, in which McIntosh, Ariarne Titmus, and Katie Ledecky were the favourites to compete for gold. McIntosh won the silver medal, finishing 0.88 seconds behind Titmus. This was her first Olympic medal and the first Canadian medal in Paris. Later in the same session McIntosh participated in the final of the 4 × 100m freestyle relay, where the Canadian team finished fourth.

McIntosh's next event was the 400m individual medley, where she was the heavy favourite. She won the gold medal, finishing more than five seconds ahead of American silver medallist Katie Grimes to take her first Olympic title. It was the first time a Canadian had ever won the event, and McIntosh said after the race that winning the gold felt "surreal." CBC Sports wrote that it was a "dominating victory", and Swimming World wrote that "McIntosh’s mastery was unveiled".

Competing next in the 200m butterfly, forty years after her mother's appearance in the same event in the 1984 Olympics, McIntosh won the gold medal and set a new Olympic record time of 2:03.03. This was the second-fastest time in the history of the women's 200m butterfly, and the fastest of the textile era. McIntosh became the first Canadian woman to win two individual gold medals at a Summer Olympics, the first Canadian to win two gold medals at a Summer Olympics since sprinter Donovan Bailey in 1996, and the first Canadian swimmer to win three individual medals at a single Olympics. In the same session she joined the Canadian team in the final of the 4×200m freestyle relay, where they finished fourth, a result she said she was "pretty disappointed with." McIntosh's next race, the 200m individual medley, drew media attention as a contest for featuring her and two other individual Olympic gold medallists, America's Kate Douglass and Australian Kaylee McKeown. This was only the second time that she had appeared in the 200 metre medley at an international competition, after the 2022 Commonwealth Games. Considered one of the favourites, she won the title with an Olympic record time of 2:06.56. She became the first Canadian to win three gold medals at a single Summer Olympics, and with four total medals she tied teammate Penny Oleksiak for the most Canadian medals in a single Olympics.

McIntosh's final swim of the Paris Olympics was as part of the Canadian team in the 4 × 100m medley relay, having replaced Oleksiak as the anchor for the event final. For the third time, the Canadians finished fourth, denying McIntosh's chance to tie Cindy Klassen's record for the most medals won by a Canadian Olympian in a single Olympics. Following the end of the Olympic swimming competitions, she returned to Canada to vacation at her family's Muskoka Lakes cottage, but travelled back to Paris a few days later upon being named Canada's co-flag bearer at the closing ceremony, alongside hammer throw champion Ethan Katzberg.

==== World Swimming Championships and recognition ====
2024 World Swimming Championships
Gold medal – first place	400 m freestyle	3:50.25 (WR)
Gold medal – first place	200 m butterfly	1:59.32 (WR)
Gold medal – first place	400 m medley	4:15.48 (WR)
Silver medal – second place	200 m backstroke	1:59.96 (NR)
Bronze medal – third place	4×100 m freestyle	3:28.44

It was announced that McIntosh would compete at the short course (25m) 2024 World Aquatics Swimming Championships, her first appearance in this World Championships format since 2021. On the first day of the event, McIntosh swam to gold in the 400m freestyle, setting a new short course world record of 3:50.25 and lowering it by over a second in the process. Later in the same session she participated in the 4×100m freestyle relay, earning a bronze medal with the Canadian team. On the same day, she was voted the recipient of the Northern Star Award as Canada's top athlete for 2024. She won another gold medal in the 200m butterfly, setting a second short course world record by breaking Spaniard Mireia Belmonte's decade-old best time.

On the penultimate day of the championships, McIntosh won gold in the 400m individual medley, breaking the last of Belmonte's world records and improving on it by over three seconds for a time of 4:15.48. On the final day, McIntosh contested the 200m backstroke, the first time she had appeared in that event at a major international championship. She took the silver medal and set a national and world junior record time of 1:59.96. McIntosh expressed disappointment with the result, but added that it was "a great motivator the next time I'm training and I'm hurting and I just remember what it's like to get silver, so it keeps me pushing forward." At the conclusion of the meet, World Aquatics named her female swimmer of the year.

In addition to the Northern Star Award and World Aquatics athlete of the year, McIntosh received her second consecutive Bobbie Rosenfeld Award as the Canadian Press's choice for female athlete of the year, winning 52 of 53 votes cast for the distinction. She was named to the Time 100 Next list, with a tribute written by Prime Minister Justin Trudeau, who described her as "a superstar at age 18 and still warming up." Forbes included McIntosh in their year-end 30 Under 30 list.

=== 2025 season ===
In February, McIntosh raced in the 800m freestyle at the Southern Zone Sectionals meet, setting a new national record time of 8:09.86. This was the tenth-fastest time in history, the nine times ahead of hers all having been set by Katie Ledecky. At the end of the month, she announced that this would be her final season training in Sarasota under Brent Arckey, and that she was contemplating working with Bob Bowman in the future. As well, she stated she would be looking to add a fifth individual event to her program for the 2025 World Aquatics Championships. On May 28, McIntosh confirmed that she would move to train under Bowman at the University of Texas at Austin in August of that year.

On June 7, McIntosh regained the world record in the women's 400m freestyle event at the Canadian swimming trials with a time of 3:54.18. Then, on June 8, she improved her national record in the 800m freestyle from an 8:09.86 to a 8:05.07. On the following day, she broke Katinka Hosszú's decade-old world record in the 200m individual medley with a time of 2:05.70, becoming the first woman with a time under 2:06. On June 10, she lowered her own national record in the 200m butterfly with a time of 2:02.26, and became the second-fastest performer of all time, in this event. In her final swim of the meet, McIntosh again lowered her own world record in the women's 400m individual medley, with a time of 4:23.65.

==== World Championships ====
2025 World Championships
Gold medal – first place	200 m butterfly	2:01.99 (CR, NR)
Gold medal – first place	200 m medley	2:06.69
Gold medal – first place	400 m freestyle	3:56.26
Gold medal – first place	400 m medley	4:25.78 (CR)
Bronze medal – third place	800 m freestyle	8:07.29

On the opening day of the swimming competitions at the 2025 World Aquatics Championships in Singapore, McIntosh raced in two heats, a semi-final, and won the gold medal in the 400m freestyle, her first in that event. With a time of 3:56.26, she finished nearly two seconds clear of silver medalist Li Bingjie. In what had been anticipated as a race between McIntosh and Ledecky, the latter finished third. On the second day, she swam the final of the 200m individual medley, her first appearance in the event at the World Aquatics Championships. McIntosh won her second gold medal of the Singapore championships with a time of 2:06.69. This was her tenth World Aquatics Championships medal, surpassing Kylie Masse and Penny Oleksiak for the most earned by a Canadian swimmer.

McIntosh entered the 200m butterfly as the prohibitive favourite for the gold medal, with speculation focused on whether she would break the world record of 2:01.81, set in 2009 by Liu Zige using a "supersuit" that would be prohibited from World Aquatics competition three months after. As a result of this, Liu's record became the longest-standing record in women's competitive swimming. McIntosh won with a time of 2:01.99, three seconds ahead of silver medalist Regan Smith. She was 0.18 seconds short of the world record, but broke Jessicah Schipper's supersuit era championship record from 2009. McIntosh faulted herself, saying "that last 15 metres I took an extra breath and I should've had my head down," but vowed "this is definitely going to fuel me for next season," adding: "If there's one world record that I wanted to break since the start of my career it's this one."

Continuing her quest to win five individual gold medals, McIntosh entered the 800m freestyle, an event she had not contested at an international championship since 2021. McIntosh held the lead at the 700-metre mark, but was passed by both Ledecky and Lani Pallister over the closing stretch, winning the bronze medal. She called the race "not even close to what I wanted time-wise, place-wise, how I executed the race." On the final day of the championship, she won gold in the 400m individual medley, and raced the butterfly leg for the Canadian team in the 4×100m medley relay, finishing fifth. With four gold medals and a bronze medal, she became only the third swimmer to take five individual medals at a World Aquatics Championship, after Michael Phelps and Sarah Sjöström. McIntosh was named Female Swimmer of the Meet by World Aquatics.

==== U.S. Open ====
McIntosh initially planned to compete in the 2025 World Aquatics Swimming World Cup in October, but then pulled out of the Carmel stop because of illness, subsequently revealed to be consequences of a lumbar puncture. She ultimately withdrew from the remainder of the Swimming World Cup, including her hometown of Toronto. After recovery, McIntosh returned to competition at the U.S. Open in Austin, Texas, winning two events and finishing third in another. At the end of the year, McIntosh finished second in balloting for the Northern Star Award, behind basketball player Shai Gilgeous-Alexander, and received her third consecutive Bobbie Rosenfeld Award as Canadian female athlete of the year. On December 30, World Aquatics named her the Female Swimmer of the Year for a second consecutive time. L'Equipe would later vote McIntosh its female International Champion of Champions for 2025.

=== 2026 season ===
In January, McIntosh secured victories in two events during the first leg of the Pro Series held in Austin. She also competed in the Westmont leg, winning three. In May, McIntosh competed at the Speedo Fort Lauderdale Open. She secured victories in the 200m freestyle (1:54.36) and the 400m freestyle (3:58.91), notably defeating Katie Ledecky in the latter. To refine her technical proficiency for individual medley events, she also entered the 200m breaststroke, finishing sixth with a time of 2:29.92. At the Canadian Trials in July, McIntosh won the 200m butterfly finals with a time of 2:01.65, breaking Liu Zige's 17-year-old world record. With this, she held four world records simultaneously. McIntosh said of the feat: "Growing up this is the one world record I thought I would never break and to do it tonight is really special in front of a home crowd." She went on to compete in and win the 400m individual medley, but announced on July 7 that she would be withdrawing from the remainder of the trials, citing illness.

McIntosh declined to participate in the 2026 Commonwealth Games, instead focusing on the 2026 Pan Pacific Swimming Championships, held that year in Irvine. This was the first edition of the championships since 2018, the scheduled 2022 edition having been cancelled due to the COVID-19 pandemic. Due to scheduling, McIntosh opted against competing in the 200m butterfly on the first day of the event, instead choosing to enter the 200m freestyle for the first time internationally since 2023. She took the silver medal, having finished 0.19 seconds behind Australian swimmer Lani Pallister. McIntosh expressed disappointment in the result, but said it was part of "working towards" the Los Angeles Olympics. On the second day, she took gold in the 400m medley and, swimming the second leg of the Canadian 4×200m freestyle relay, won a bronze medal with her teammates. The pre-event favourite in the 400m freestyle on the third day, McIntosh unexpectedly missed qualification to the 'A' final, having come ninth in the heats. On the final day, she won silver in the 200m medley, coming 0.02 seconds behind Yu Yiting of China, and then finished fourth in the 4×100m medley relay with the Canadian team. She observed that the medley was "probably one of my better swims of the meet, but overall this meet didn't go the way I wanted it to. So there will definitely be a lot of reflection and focus on how I can be better next season."

== Results ==
=== Championships ===
Meet	200 free	400 free	800 free	200 back	200 butterfly	200 medley	400 medley	4 × 100 free	4 × 200 free	4 × 100 medley
OG 2021	9th	4th	11th						4th	
SCW 2021	5th	2nd place, silver medalist(s)	WD^{[a]}						1st place, gold medalist(s)	2nd place, silver medalist(s)
WC 2022		2nd place, silver medalist(s)			1st place, gold medalist(s)		1st place, gold medalist(s)		3rd place, bronze medalist(s)	
CG 2022		2nd place, silver medalist(s)				1st place, gold medalist(s)	1st place, gold medalist(s)	3rd place, bronze medalist(s)	2nd place, silver medalist(s)	2nd place, silver medalist(s)
WC 2023	3rd place, bronze medalist(s)	4th			1st place, gold medalist(s)		1st place, gold medalist(s)	7th	5th	3rd place, bronze medalist(s)
OG 2024		2nd place, silver medalist(s)			1st place, gold medalist(s)	1st place, gold medalist(s)	1st place, gold medalist(s)	4th	4th	4th
SCW 2024		1st place, gold medalist(s)		2nd place, silver medalist(s)	1st place, gold medalist(s)		1st place, gold medalist(s)	3rd place, bronze medalist(s)		
WC 2025		1st place, gold medalist(s)	3rd place, bronze medalist(s)		1st place, gold medalist(s)	1st place, gold medalist(s)	1st place, gold medalist(s)			5th
PAC 2026	2nd place, silver medalist(s)	9th				2nd place, silver medalist(s)	1st place, gold medalist(s)		3rd place, bronze medalist(s)	4th

^{a} McIntosh withdrew from the 800 freestyle after swimming in the heats.

=== Swimming World Cup ===
The following medals McIntosh has won at Swimming World Cup circuits.

Edition	Gold medals	Silver medals	Bronze medals	Total
2022	3	1	2	6
2025	Withdrew			
Total	3	1	2	6

== Personal bests ==
=== Long course (50-metre pool) ===
Event	Time	Venue	Date	Notes	Ref
50 m freestyle	25.54	Rosen Aquatic & Fitness Center, Orlando	February 9, 2024		
100 m freestyle	53.90	Toronto Pan Am Sports Centre, Toronto	April 11, 2024		
200 m freestyle	1:53.65	Marine Messe Fukuoka, Fukuoka	July 26, 2023	WJR, NR	
400 m freestyle	3:54.18	Saanich Commonwealth Place, Victoria, British Columbia	June 7, 2025	WR	
800 m freestyle	8:05.07	Saanich Commonwealth Place, Victoria, British Columbia	June 8, 2025	CR, NR	
1500 m freestyle	16:15.19	Toronto Pan Am Sports Centre, Toronto	May 7, 2021		
50 m backstroke	29.20	McAuley Aquatic Center, Atlanta	May 13, 2023		
100 m backstroke	59.64	Rosen Aquatic & Fitness Center, Orlando	February 9, 2024		
200 m backstroke	2:06.81	Greensboro Aquatic Center, Greensboro	December 3, 2023		
100 m breaststroke	1:10:39	Rosen Aquatic & Fitness Center, Orlando	February 10, 2023		
200 m breaststroke	2:27:23	Rosen Aquatic & Fitness Center, Orlando	February 10, 2024		
50 m butterfly	26.74	Toronto Pan Am Sports Centre, Toronto	April 12, 2024		
100 m butterfly	57.01	Lee and Joe Jamail Texas Swimming Center, Austin	December 5, 2025		
200 m butterfly	2:01.65	Montreal Olympic Pool, Montreal, Quebec	July 5, 2026	WR	
200 m individual medley	2:05.70	Saanich Commonwealth Place, Victoria, British Columbia	June 9, 2025	WR	
400 m individual medley	4:23.65	Saanich Commonwealth Place, Victoria, British Columbia	June 11, 2025	WR	

Legend: WR – World record; AM – Americas record; CR – Commonwealth record; e – equalled existing record; NR – Canadian record; WJR – World junior record;
Records not set in finals: h – heat; sf – semifinal; r – relay 1st leg; rh – relay heat 1st leg; b – B final; † – en route to final mark; so – swim-off; tt – time trial

=== Short course (25-metre pool) ===
Event	Time	Venue	Date	Notes	Ref
200 m freestyle	1:52.63	Indiana University Natatorium, Indianapolis	November 4, 2022		
400 m freestyle	3:50.25	Danube Arena, Budapest	December 10, 2024	WR, WJR	
800 m freestyle	8:07.12	Indiana University Natatorium, Indianapolis	November 5, 2022	NR	
200 m backstroke	1:59.96	Danube Arena, Budapest	December 15, 2024	WJR, NR	
200 m butterfly	1:59.32	Danube Arena, Budapest	December 12, 2024	WR, WJR	
200 m individual medley	2:06.57	Toronto Pan Am Sports Centre, Toronto	October 30, 2022		
400 m individual medley	4:15.48	Danube Arena, Budapest	December 14, 2024	WR, WJR	

Legend: WR – World record; AM – Americas record; CR – Commonwealth record; e – equalled existing record; NR – Canadian record; WJR – World junior record;
Records not set in finals: h – heat; sf – semifinal; r – relay 1st leg; rh – relay heat 1st leg; b – B final; † – en route to final mark; so – swim-off; tt – time trial

== World Records ==
=== World records ===
==== Long course meters (50 m pool) ====
No.	Event	Time	Meet	Location	Date	Status	Age	Ref
1	400 m freestyle	3:56.08	2023 Canadian Trials	Toronto, Canada	March 28, 2023	Former	16	
2	400 m individual medley	4:25.87	2023 Canadian Trials	Toronto, Canada	April 1, 2023	Former	16	
3	400 m individual medley (2)	4:24.38	2024 Canadian Trials	Toronto, Canada	May 16, 2024	Former	17	
4	400 m freestyle (2)	3:54.18	2025 Canadian Trials	Victoria, Canada	June 7, 2025	Current	18	
5	200 m individual medley	2:05.70	2025 Canadian Trials	Victoria, Canada	June 9, 2025	Current	18	
6	400 m individual medley (3)	4:23.65	2025 Canadian Trials	Victoria, Canada	June 11, 2025	Current	18	
7	200 m butterfly	2:01.65	2026 Canadian Trials	Montreal, Canada	July 5, 2026	Current	19	

==== Short course meters (25 m pool) ====
No.	Event	Time	Meet	Location	Date	Status	Age	Ref
1	400 m freestyle	3:50.25	2024 World Aquatics Championships (25m)	Budapest, Hungary	December 10, 2024	Current	18	
2	200 m butterfly	1:59.32	2024 World Aquatics Championships (25m)	Budapest, Hungary	December 12, 2024	Current	18	
3	400 m individual medley	4:15.48	2024 World Aquatics Championships (25m)	Budapest, Hungary	December 14, 2024	Current	18	

=== World junior records ===
==== Long course meters (50 m pool) ====
No.	Event	Time	Meet	Location	Date	Status	Age	Ref
1	200 m freestyle	1:53.65	2023 World Aquatics Championships	Fukuoka, Japan	26 July, 2023	Current	16	
2	400 m freestyle	3:56.08	2023 Canadian Trials	Toronto, Canada	March 28, 2023	Current	16	
3	200 m butterfly	2:03.03	2024 Olympic Games	Paris, France	1 August, 2024	Current	17	
4	200 m individual medley	2:06.56	2024 Olympic Games	Paris, France	3 August, 2024	Current	17	
5	400 m individual medley	4:24.38	2024 Canadian Trials	Toronto, Canada	May 16, 2024	Current	17	

==== Short course meters (25 m pool) ====
No.	Event	Time	Meet	Location	Date	Status	Age	Ref
1	400 m freestyle	3:50.25	2024 World Aquatics Championships (25m)	Budapest, Hungary	December 10, 2024	Current	18	
2	200 m backstroke	1:59.96	2024 World Aquatics Championships (25m)	Budapest, Hungary	December 15, 2024	Current	18	
3	200 m butterfly	1:59.32	2024 World Aquatics Championships (25m)	Budapest, Hungary	December 12, 2024	Current	18	
4	400 m individual medley	4:15.48	2024 World Aquatics Championships (25m)	Budapest, Hungary	December 14, 2024	Current	18	

== See also ==
- List of World Aquatics Championships medalists in swimming (women)

Records
Preceded by (Australia) Ariarne Titmus (Australia) Ariarne Titmus	Women's 400-metre freestyle world record-holder (long course); March 28, 2023 – July 23, 2023; June 7, 2025 – present	Succeeded by (Australia) Ariarne Titmus; Incumbent
Preceded by (Hungary) Katinka Hosszú	Women's 400 metre individual medley world record holder (long course); April 1, 2023 – present	Succeeded by Incumbent
Preceded by (China) Li Bingjie	Women's 400-metre freestyle world record-holder (short course); December 10, 2024 – present	Succeeded by Incumbent
Preceded by (Spain) Mireia Belmonte	Women's 200 metres butterfly world record holder (short course); December 12, 2024 – present	Succeeded by Incumbent
Preceded by (Spain) Mireia Belmonte	Women's 400 metres individual medley world record holder (short course); December 14, 2024 – present	Succeeded by Incumbent
Preceded by (Hungary) Katinka Hosszú	Women's 200 metre individual medley world record holder (long course); June 9, 2025 – present	Succeeded by Incumbent
Preceded by (China) Liu Zige	Women's 200 metre butterfly world record holder (long course); July 5, 2026 – present	Succeeded by Incumbent
