= Swimming at the 2023 World Aquatics Championships – Women's 4 × 200 metre freestyle relay =

Women's 4 × 200 metre freestyle relay at the 2023 World Aquatics Championships
- Venue: Marine Messe Fukuoka
- Location: Fukuoka, Japan
- Dates: 27 July (heats and final)
- Competitors: 82 from 18 nations
- Teams: 18
- Winning time: 7:37.50 WR

Medalists
gold medal	Mollie O'Callaghan; Shayna Jack; Brianna Throssell; Ariarne Titmus; Madison Wilson; Lani Pallister; Kiah Melverton	Australia
silver medal	Erin Gemmell; Katie Ledecky; Bella Sims; Alex Shackell; Leah Smith; Anna Peplowski	United States
bronze medal	Li Bingjie; Li Jiaping; Ai Yanhan; Liu Yaxin; Yang Peiqi; Ge Chutong	China

The women's 4 × 200 metre freestyle relay competition at the 2023 World Aquatics Championships was held on 27 July 2023.

== Records ==
Prior to the competition, the existing world and championship records were as follows:

World record	Australia; Madison Wilson (1:56.27); Kiah Melverton (1:55.40); Mollie O'Callaghan (1:54.80); Ariarne Titmus (1:52.82)	7:39.29	Birmingham, Great Britain	31 July 2022
Competition record	United States; Claire Weinstein (1:56.71); Leah Smith (1:56.47); Katie Ledecky (1:53.67); Bella Sims (1:54.60)	7:41.45	Budapest, Hungary	22 June 2022

The following new records were set during this competition:

Date	Event	Nation	Swimmers	Time	Record
27 July	Final	Australia	Mollie O'Callaghan (1:53.66); Shayna Jack (1:55.63); Brianna Throssell (1:55.80); Ariarne Titmus (1:52.41)	7:37.50	WR

== Results ==
=== Heats ===
The heats were started at 11:45.

Rank	Heat	Lane	Nation	Swimmers	Time	Notes
1	1	4	United States	Leah Smith (1:57.78); Erin Gemmell (1:55.65); Alex Shackell (1:56.05); Anna Peplowski (1:56.88)	7:46.36	Q
2	2	4	Australia	Madison Wilson (1:57.06); Lani Pallister (1:56.83); Brianna Throssell (1:56.31); Kiah Melverton (1:57.64)	7:47.84	Q
3	1	3	Great Britain	Freya Colbert (1:57.35); Abbie Wood (1:57.35); Medi Harris (1:58.74); Lucy Hope (1:57.32)	7:51.13	Q
4	1	5	China	Ai Yanhan (1:56.97); Yang Peiqi (1:59.07); Ge Chutong (1:58.21); Li Jiaping (1:57.30)	7:51.55	Q
5	2	3	Netherlands	Janna van Kooten (1:58.48); Imani de Jong (1:59.35); Silke Holkenborg (1:59.42); Marrit Steenbergen (1:56.27)	7:53.52	Q
6	2	5	Canada	Ella Jansen (1:59.53); Emma O'Croinin (1:58.10); Brooklyn Douthwright (1:58.25); Katerine Savard (1:58.85)	7:54.73	Q
7	2	6	Hungary	Lilla Minna Ábrahám (1:59.12); Nikolett Pádár (1:57.83); Ajna Késely (1:58.78); Dóra Molnár (1:59.53)	7:55.26	Q
8	1	6	Brazil	Stephanie Balduccini (1:59.83); Maria Fernanda Costa (1:58.13); Gabrielle Roncatto (1:59.12); Nathália Almeida (1:59.06)	7:56.14	Q
9	2	2	Japan	Rio Shirai (1:58.80); Nagisa Ikemoto (1:58.33); Chihiro Igarashi (1:59.94); Kinuko Mochizuki (2:00.15)	7:57.22	
10	1	1	Israel	Anastasia Gorbenko (1:58.18); Daria Golovaty (1:59.36); Ayla Spitz (2:00.80); Lea Polonsky (2:00.68)	7:59.02	NR
11	2	7	New Zealand	Erika Fairweather (1:57.02); Eve Thomas (1:59.80); Summer Osborne (2:02.81); Caitlin Deans (2:00.48)	8:00.11	
12	1	2	Italy	Sofia Morini (1:59.36); Costanza Cocconcelli (2:00.70); Sara Franceschi (1:59.30); Emma Menicucci (2:00.77)	8:00.13	
13	1	7	Germany	Isabel Gose (1:58.71); Leonie Kullmann (2:00.84); Nele Schulze (2:01.13); Nina Holt (1:59.80)	8:00.48	
14	1	8	Spain	Carla Carron (2:01.28); Ainhoa Campabadal (2:01.24); Alba Herrero (2:00.44); Paula Juste (2:00.66)	8:03.62	
15	2	8	South Korea	Kim Seo-yeong (1:59.87); Hur Yeon-kyung (1:59.38); Han Da-kyung (2:03.10); Park Su-jin (2:03.05)	8:05.40	
16	2	1	Austria	Lena Kreundl (2:01.69); Marlene Kahler (2:00.69); Cornelia Pammer (2:00.84); Lena Opatril (2:02.55)	8:05.77	
17	2	9	Belgium	Valentine Dumont (1:58.92); Fleur Verdonck (2:01.20); Lotte Vanhauwaert (2:02.32); Lana Ravelingien (2:04.50)	8:06.94	
18	2	0	Turkey	Deniz Ertan (2:03.03); Merve Tuncel (2:01.03); Ecem Dönmez (2:02.78); Ela Naz Özdemir (2:03.92)	8:10.76	
	1	0	Mexico	Did not start		

=== Final ===
The final was held at 21:45.

Rank	Lane	Nation	Swimmers	Time	Notes
1st place, gold medalist(s)	5	Australia	Mollie O'Callaghan (1:53.66); Shayna Jack (1:55.63); Brianna Throssell (1:55.80); Ariarne Titmus (1:52.41)	7:37.50	WR
2nd place, silver medalist(s)	4	United States	Erin Gemmell (1:55.97); Katie Ledecky (1:54.39); Bella Sims (1:54.64); Alex Shackell (1:56.38)	7:41.38	
3rd place, bronze medalist(s)	6	China	Li Bingjie (1:55.83); Li Jiaping (1:57.54); Ai Yanhan (1:55.57); Liu Yaxin (1:55.46)	7:44.40	
4	3	Great Britain	Freya Colbert (1:56.16); Lucy Hope (1:57.32); Abbie Wood (1:56.85); Freya Anderson (1:56.30)	7:46.63	
5	7	Canada	Mary-Sophie Harvey (1:58.50); Summer McIntosh (1:53.97); Emma O'Croinin (1:59.24); Brooklyn Douthwright (1:58.27)	7:49.98	
6	2	Netherlands	Janna van Kooten (1:58.17); Imani de Jong (1:59.60); Silke Holkenborg (1:59.69); Marrit Steenbergen (1:55.47)	7:52.93	
7	1	Hungary	Nikolett Pádár (1:56.74); Lilla Minna Ábrahám (1:59.30); Dóra Molnár (1:59.16); Ajna Késely (1:59.45)	7:54.65	
8	8	Brazil	Stephanie Balduccini (2:01.05); Maria Fernanda Costa (1:59.01); Gabrielle Roncatto (1:59.22); Nathália Almeida (1:59.82)	7:59.10	
