= U.S. Open (swimming) =

Swimming competition in the United States

The U.S. Open Swimming Championships, or U.S. Open, is a championship meet organized by USA Swimming which is open to international teams/swimmers. It was first held in 1985, and was held annually in December through 2006. Beginning in 2007, the meet's first-weekend-of-December timing was given over to the resurrected USA Short Course Nationals, and the U.S. Open moved to being held on an as-needed basis (generally in years where the USA championship that is swum is closed or partially closed to foreign swimmers). From 2007 to 2017, the meet was held in early August, in years where the U.S. Nationals were not held in August. In recent years, the meet has returned to the end of the calendar year.

The meet is traditionally a long course (50m) meet, although twice has been swum short course meters (25m): in 1996 and in 1998 (the latter where it immediately followed a World Aquatics Swimming World Cup meet).

== Editions ==
Year	Location	Pool	Dates	Results	Notes
1985	Austin, Texas	Texas Swimming Center			
1986	Orlando, Florida	Justice Aquatics Center			
1987	Orlando, Florida	Justice Aquatics Center	December 20–22	results	
1988	Indianapolis, Indiana	Indiana University Natatorium	December 18–20	results	
1989	Orlando, Florida	Justice Aquatics Center	December 3–5	results	
1990	Indianapolis, Indiana	Indiana University Natatorium	November 30 – December 2	results	
1991	Minneapolis, Minnesota	University Aquatic Center	November 30 – December 1	results	
1992	Orlando, Florida	Justice Aquatics Center			
1993	Ann Arbor, Michigan	Canham Natatorium	December		
1994	Buffalo, New York	Burt Flickinger Center			
1995	Auburn, Alabama	Martin Aquatics Center			
1996	San Antonio, Texas	Palo Alto Natatorium	December 5–7	results	25m
1997	Indianapolis, Indiana	Indiana University Natatorium	December 4–6	results	
1998	College Station, Texas	Student Rec Center Natatorium	December 3–5	results	25m
1999	San Antonio, Texas	Palo Alto Natatorium	December 2–4	results	
2000	Auburn, Alabama	Martin Aquatics Center			
2001	East Meadow, New York	Nassau County Aquatic Center	November 29 – December 1	results	
2002	Minneapolis, Minnesota	University Aquatic Center	December 5–7	results	
2003	Federal Way, Washington	Weyerhaeuser King County Aquatic Center	December 4–6	results	
2004	San Antonio, Texas	Palo Alto Natatorium	December 2–4	results	
2005	Auburn, Alabama	Martin Aquatics Center	December 1–3	results	
2006	West Lafayette, Indiana	Boilermaker Aquatic Center	November 30 – December 2	results	
2008	Minneapolis, Minnesota	University Aquatic Center	July 29-August 2	results	
2009	Federal Way, Washington	Weyerhaeuser King County Aquatic Center	August 4–8	results	
2012	Indianapolis, Indiana	Indiana University Natatorium	August 7–11	results	
2013	Irvine, California	William Woollett Jr. Aquatics Center	July 30 – August 3	results	
2016	Minneapolis, Minnesota	Jean K. Freeman Aquatic Center	August 2–6	results	
2017	East Meadow, New York	Nassau County Aquatic Center	August 2–6	results	
2019	Atlanta, Georgia	Georgia Tech McAuley Aquatic Center	December 4–7	results	
2020	Beaverton, Oregon	Tualatin Hills Aquatic Center	November 12–14		combined results
2020	Des Moines, Iowa	Wellmark YMCA-The YMCA of Greater Des Moines	November 12–14		combined results
2020	Greensboro, North Carolina	Greensboro Aquatic Center	November 12–14	results	combined results
2020	Huntsville, Alabama	Huntsville Aquatics Center	November 12–14		combined results
2020	Indianapolis, Indiana	Indiana University Natatorium	November 12–14		combined results
2020	Irvine, California	William Woollett Jr. Aquatics Center	November 12–14		combined results
2020	Richmond, Virginia	SwimRVA	November 12–14		combined results
2020	San Antonio, Texas	Blossom Athletic Center	November 12–14		combined results
2020	Sarasota, Florida	Selby Aquatic Center	November 12–14		combined results
2021	Greensboro, North Carolina	Greensboro Aquatic Center	December 1–4	results	
2022	Greensboro, North Carolina	Greensboro Aquatic Center	November 30 – December 3		
2023	Greensboro, North Carolina	Greensboro Aquatic Center	November 29 – December 2		
2024	Greensboro, North Carolina	Greensboro Aquatic Center	December 4–7	results	
2025	Austin, Texas	Lee and Joe Jamail Texas Swimming Center	December 3–6		

== Team Champions ==
Year	Combined	Men's	Women's
1985			
1986			
1987	club: Mission Bay college: Florida Gators	club: Concord-Pleasant Hill college: USC Trojans	club: Mission Bay college: Florida Gators
1988		Little Rock Dolphins	
1989	Longhorn Aquatics	Miami	Texas
1990	The Peddie School	The Peddie School	Mission Viejo Nadadores
1991			
1992			
1993			
1994		University of Calgary Swim Club	
1995			
1996	Greenwood Memorial Swim Club		
1997			
1998			
1999	club: Queensland Academy of Sport college: Cal Bears	Australian Institute of Sport	Queensland Academy of Sport
2000			
2001	club: Bolles Sharks college: Florida Gators	club: Bolles Sharks college: Florida Gators	club: Irvine Aquazot college: SMU Mustangs
2002	club: Circle C Swimming college: Florida Gators	club: Circle C Swimming college: Minnesota Gophers	club: Circle C Swimming college: Florida Gators
2003	club: Irvine Novaquatics college: Florida Gators	club: Irvine Novaquatics college: Michigan Wolverines	club: Irvine Novaquatics college: Florida Gators
2004	club: Longhorn Aquatics college: Florida Gators	club: Club Wolverine college: Michigan Wolverines	
2005	club: North Baltimore Aquatic Club college: Auburn Tigers	club: Team Alberta college: Florida Gators	club: North Baltimore Aquatic Club college: Auburn Tigers
2006	club: Club Wolverine college: Auburn Tigers	club: Club Wolverine college: Michigan Wolverines	club: North Baltimore Aquatic Club college: Auburn Tigers
2008	Longhorn Aquatics	Club Wolverine	Athens Bulldog Swim Club
2009	Tucson Ford Dealers Aquatics	Tucson Ford Dealers Aquatics	Tucson Ford Dealers Aquatics
2012	Australia	Australia	Great Britain
2013	Australia	Stanford Swimming	Australia
2016	Australia	Australia	Aggie Swim Club
2017	Texas A&M	California Aquatics	Texas A&M
2019	Athens Bulldog Swim Club	University of Florida	Nation's Capital Swim Club

== U.S. Open records ==
=== Men ===
Event	Time		Name	Club	Date	Location	Ref
50m freestyle	21.57		Chris Guiliano	Texas Longhorn Aquatics	4 December 2025	Austin, United States	
100m freestyle	47.40		Jack Alexy	California Aquatics	6 December 2025	Austin, United States	
200m freestyle	1:44.49		Luke Hobson	New York Athletic Club	5 December 2025	Austin, United States	
400m freestyle	3:44.70		Leon Marchand	Texas Longhorn Aquatics	4 December 2025	Austin, United States	
800m freestyle	7:47.27		Chad La Tourette	Mission Viejo Nadadores	8 August 2009	Federal Way, United States	
1500m freestyle	14:55.46		Damien Joly	France	2 August 2017	East Meadow, United States	
100m backstroke	52.51		Nick Thoman	-	7 August 2009	Federal Way, United States	
200m backstroke	1:54.21		Hubert Kos	Texas Longhorn Aquatics	6 December 2025	Austin, United States	
100m breaststroke	59.28	h	Andrew Wilson	Athens Bulldog Swim Club	6 December 2019	Atlanta, United States	
200m breaststroke	2:09.49		Matthew Fallon	University of Pennsylvania	2 December 2023	Greensboro, United States	
100m butterfly	50.24		Shaine Casas	Texas Longhorn Aquatics	5 December 2025	Austin, United States	
200m butterfly	1:52.57		Leon Marchand	Texas Longhorn Aquatics	6 December 2025	Austin, United States	
200m individual medley	1:55.50		Hubert Kos	Texas Longhorn Aquatics	4 December 2025	Austin, United States	
400m individual medley	4:07.02		Carson Foster	UN-MR	5 December 2025	Austin, United States	
4×100m freestyle relay	3:16.87		William Stockwell (49.50); Alexander Graham (49.11); Blake Jones (49.21); Zac Incerti (49.05)	Australia	3 August 2016	Minneapolis, United States	
4×200m freestyle relay	7:18.82		Jack Brown (1:49.37); Adam Ritter (1:47.92); Alexander Tipton (1:50.94); Austen Thompson (1:50.59)	Tucson Ford Dealers Aquatics	6 August 2009	Federal Way, United States	
4×100m medley relay	3:36.55		Matt Clay (53.97); James Gibson (1:00.12); Ian Hulme (52.86); Charles Turner (49.60)	Great Britain	2 August 2008	Minneapolis, United States	

Legend: # – Record awaiting ratification by USA Swimming; WR – World record; AM – Americas record;
Records not set in finals: h – heat; r – relay 1st leg; rh – relay heat 1st leg; b – B final; † – en route to final mark; tt – time trial

=== Women ===
Event	Time	Name	Club	Date	Location	Ref
50m freestyle	24.20	Kate Douglass	New York Aquatic Club	4 December 2025	Austin, United States	
100m freestyle	52.94	Siobhan Haughey	Hong Kong	2 December 2023	Greensboro, United States	
200m freestyle	1:54.20	Siobhan Haughey	Hong Kong	1 December 2023	Greensboro, United States	
400m freestyle	3:55.37	Summer McIntosh	Texas Longhorn Aquatics	4 December 2025	Austin, United States	
800m freestyle	8:12.81	Katie Ledecky	University of Florida	1 December 2021	Greensboro, United States	
1500m freestyle	15:35.98	Katie Ledecky	Nation's Capital Swim Club	7 December 2019	Atlanta, United States	
100m backstroke	57.95	Regan Smith	Arizona State Sun Devils	2 December 2022	Greensboro, United States	
200m backstroke	2:04.27	Regan Smith	Arizona State Sun Devils	2 December 2023	Greensboro, United States	
100m breaststroke	1:04.45	Jessica Hardy	Trojan Swimming Club	7 August 2009	Federal Way, United States	
200m breaststroke	2:20.86	Kate Douglass	New York Athletic Club	6 December 2025	Austin, United States	
100m butterfly	55.60	Gretchen Walsh	New York Athletic Club	5 December 2025	Austin, United States	
200m butterfly	2:02.62	Summer McIntosh	Texas Longhorn Aquatics	6 December 2025	Austin, United States	
200m individual medley	2:07.85	Kate Douglass	New York Athletic Club	4 December 2025	Austin, United States	
400m individual medley	4:28.61	Summer McIntosh	Sarasota Sharks	2 December 2022	Greensboro, United States	
4×100m freestyle relay	3:42.38	Kelly Stubbins (55.80); Yolane Kukla (55.27); Madeline Groves (56.12); Mikkayla Sheridan (55.19)	Australia	30 July 2013	Irvine, United States	
4×200m freestyle relay	8:00.84	Sarah Denninghoff (2:00.56); Quinn Carrozza (1:58.43); Alexandra Hooper (2:00.89); Samantha Tucker (2:00.96)	Longhorn Aquatics	1 August 2013	Irvine, United States	
4×100m medley relay	4:04.64	Haley Baker (1:01.76); Leiston Pickett (1:07.43); Christina Licciardi (1:00.56); Yolane Kukla (54.89)	Australia	2 August 2013	Irvine, United States	

Legend: # – Record awaiting ratification by USA Swimming; WR – World record; AM – Americas record;
Records not set in finals: h – heat; r – relay 1st leg; rh – relay heat 1st leg; b – B final; † – en route to final mark; tt – time trial
