= Swimming at the 2022 Commonwealth Games – Women's 4 × 200 metre freestyle relay =

Women's 4 × 200 metre freestyle relay at the 2022 Commonwealth Games
- Venue: Sandwell Aquatics Centre
- Dates: 31 July
- Competitors: 20 from 5 nations
- Winning time: 7:39.29

Medalists
gold medal	Madison Wilson; Kiah Melverton; Mollie O'Callaghan; Ariarne Titmus	Australia
silver medal	Summer McIntosh; Ella Jansen; Mary-Sophie Harvey; Katerine Savard	Canada
bronze medal	Freya Colbert; Tamryn van Selm; Abbie Wood; Freya Anderson	England

The women's 4 × 200 metre freestyle relay event at the 2022 Commonwealth Games was held on 31 July at the Sandwell Aquatics Centre.

== Records ==
Prior to this competition, the existing world, Commonwealth and Games records were as follows:

World record	China (CHN); Yang Junxuan; Tang Muhan; Zhang Yufei; Li Bingjie	7:40.33	Tokyo, Japan	29 July 2021
Commonwealth record	Australia (AUS); Ariarne Titmus; Emma McKeon; Madison Wilson; Leah Neale	7:41.29	Tokyo, Japan	29 July 2021
Games record	Australia; Emma McKeon; Brianna Throssell; Leah Neale; Ariarne Titmus	7:48.04	Gold Coast, Australia	7 April 2018

The following records were established during the competition:

Date	Event	Name	Nationality	Time	Record
31 July	Final	Madison Wilson; Kiah Melverton; Mollie O'Callaghan; Ariarne Titmus	Australia	7:39.29	WR, GR

== Schedule ==
The schedule is as follows:

All times are British Summer Time (UTC+1)

Date	Time	Round
Sunday 31 July 2022	21:13	Final

== Results ==
=== Final ===
Rank	Lane	Nation	Swimmers	Time	Notes
1st place, gold medalist(s)	5	Australia	Madison Wilson (1:56.27); Kiah Melverton (1:55.40); Mollie O'Callaghan (1:54.80); Ariarne Titmus (1:52.82)	7:39.29	WR
2nd place, silver medalist(s)	4	Canada	Summer McIntosh (1:55.24); Ella Jansen (1:57.83); Mary-Sophie Harvey (1:59.65); Katerine Savard (1:59.26)	7:51.98	
3rd place, bronze medalist(s)	3	England	Freya Colbert (1:57.85); Tamryn van Selm (2:02.60); Abbie Wood (1:58.99); Freya Anderson (1:57.67)	7:57.11	
4	6	South Africa	Aimee Canny (1:58.72); Duné Coetzee (1:59.49); Erin Gallagher (2:03.35); Michaela Pulford (2:00.69)	8:02.25	
5	2	Scotland	Lucy Hope (2:01.78); Emma Russell (2:03.78); Evie Davis (2:05.16); Tain Bruce (2:03.12)	8:13.84	
