= 2024 World Aquatics Swimming Championships (25 m) – Women's 400 metre individual medley =

Swimming competition

Women's 400 metre individual medley at the 2024 World Aquatics Swimming Championships (25 m)
- Venue: Duna Arena
- Location: Budapest, Hungary
- Dates: 14 December (heats and final)
- Competitors: 30 from 23 nations
- Winning time: 4:15.48 WR

Medalists
gold medal	Summer McIntosh	Canada
silver medal	Katie Grimes	United States
bronze medal	Abbie Wood	Great Britain

The women's 400 metre individual medley event at the 2024 World Aquatics Swimming Championships (25 m) was held on 14 December 2024 at the Duna Arena in Budapest, Hungary.

== Records ==
Prior to the competition, the existing world and championship records were as follows:

World record	Mireia Belmonte Garcia (ESP)	4:18.94	Eindhoven, Netherlands	12 August 2017
Competition record	Mireia Belmonte Garcia (ESP)	4:19.86	Doha, Qatar	3 December 2014

The following record was established during the competition:

Date	Event	Name	Nationality	Time	Record
14 December	Final	Summer McIntosh	Canada	4:15.48	WR

== Results ==
=== Heats ===
The heats were started at 9:02.

Rank	Heat	Lane	Name	Nationality	Time	Notes
1	4	4	Katie Grimes	United States	4:24.74	Q
2	3	4	Summer McIntosh	Canada	4:25.86	Q
3	4	5	Mary-Sophie Harvey	Canada	4:27.01	Q
4	3	5	Abbie Wood	Great Britain	4:29.21	Q
5	3	3	Ellen Walshe	Ireland	4:29.78	Q
6	4	3	Tara Kinder	Australia	4:30.17	Q
7	4	6	Kayla Hardy	Australia	4:31.35	Q
8	3	2	Emma Carrasco	Spain	4:32.20	Q
9	3	7	Ayami Suzuki	Japan	4:33.52	R
10	2	2	Kristen Romano	Puerto Rico	4:33.56	R, NR
11	4	0	Lilla Bognar	United States	4:33.77	
12	3	1	Zhou Yanjun	China	4:34.08	
13	2	4	Misuzu Nagaoka	Japan	4:34.57	
14	4	1	Vivien Jackl	Hungary	4:35.61	
15	4	8	Laura Cabanes	Spain	4:37.33	
16	4	7	Boglárka Kapás	Hungary	4:37.46	
17	2	5	Clara Rybak-Andersen	Denmark	4:39.09	
18	2	1	Katja Fain	Slovenia	4:39.26	
19	4	2	Viktoriia Blinova	Neutral Athletes B	4:40.17	
20	3	6	Zheng Huiyu	China	4:41.30	
21	3	9	Gina McCarthy	New Zealand	4:41.85	
22	4	9	Nikoleta Trníková	Slovakia	4:41.87	
23	2	6	Xiandi Chua	Philippines	4:43.85	NR
24	2	8	Lee Hee-eun	South Korea	4:44.78	
25	2	7	Jinjutha Pholjamjumrus	Thailand	4:45.44	
26	1	3	Kinga Paradowska	Poland	4:45.70	
27	2	3	Ng Lai Wa	Hong Kong	4:45.79	
28	1	5	Nicole Frank	Uruguay	4:46.81	NR
29	3	8	Applejean Gwinn	Chinese Taipei	4:51.26	
30	1	4	Karin Belbeisi	Jordan	4:56.52	
	2	0	Inana Soleman	Syria	Did not start	
	3	0	Gabrielle Roncatto	Brazil	Did not start	

=== Final ===
The final was held at 18:30.

Rank	Lane	Name	Nationality	Time	Notes
1st place, gold medalist(s)	4	Summer McIntosh	Canada	4:15.48	WR
2nd place, silver medalist(s)	4	Katie Grimes	United States	4:20.14	NR
3rd place, bronze medalist(s)	6	Abbie Wood	Great Britain	4:24.34	
4	3	Mary-Sophie Harvey	Canada	4:26.09	
5	2	Ellen Walshe	Ireland	4:29.86	
6	1	Kayla Hardy	Australia	4:30.01	
7	7	Tara Kinder	Australia	4:30.87	
8	8	Emma Carrasco	Spain	4:31.18	
