= Brent Arckey =

American swimming coach

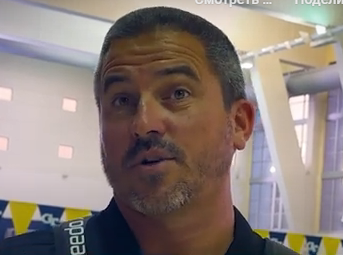
- Born: July 29, 1984 (age 41)
- Education: University of Florida (2008)
- Occupation: Swimming coach
- Years active: 2005–present
- Known for: Coaching Summer McIntosh, Emma Weyant, Regan Smith, Olivia Smoliga, Taylor Ruck, Ilya Kharun
- Awards: Florida LSC Coach of the Year (2016, 2019); Florida High School Coach of the Year

Brent Arckey (born July 29, 1984) is an American swimming coach, head coach of the Sarasota Sharks club (United States) since 2014, and CEO of the club since 2017. He is a member of the coaching staffs for the U.S. national team at the Junior World Championships and the Olympic Games.

== Biography ==
Brent Arckey was born on July 29, 1984. He earned a degree in sports management from the University of Florida.

== Career ==
From 2005 to 2010, Arckey worked at the Gator Swim Club in Gainesville, Florida, where he coached both age groups and the Masters category. Here, he gained experience that allowed him to move to a higher level of work with young athletes.

In 2010, he joined the Sarasota Sharks club in Florida. Since 2014, he has been the head coach of the club, and since 2017, its CEO.

Arckey is known for his individualized approach to each athlete, emphasizing technical precision and psychological preparation. His methodology is based on a thorough analysis of movements and continuous monitoring of progress using modern video analysis technologies. In the training process, he emphasizes the development of endurance and strength with a balance of techniques to prevent injuries and burnout in athletes. He also pays close attention to fostering team spirit and motivation, which contributes to achieving high results at international competitions. His philosophy is based on the idea that success is achieved through the harmonious development of the physical, technical, and psychological components of an athlete.

Under his leadership, the Sarasota Sharks has become one of the strongest clubs in the United States, regularly winning youth and national championships. Arckey has created a sustainable training culture focused on technical excellence and long-term athlete development. In a 2023 interview, he emphasized the importance of "conscious volume," an individualized approach, and working on leg technique as the basis of swimming speed.

Since the late 2010s, Arckey has been actively involved in the coaching staff of the United States national team. In 2019, he led one of the groups at the Junior World Championships in Budapest, and later became one of the personal coaches of athletes who qualified for the 2020 Tokyo Olympics, including Emma Weyant, a silver medalist at the Games.

In 2022–2024, Arckey continued to train elite swimmers as part of the U.S. national cycle and participated in the selection for the 2024 Olympic Games in Paris. Under his leadership, the Sharks club reached a record level in the number of athletes who made it into the U.S. national teams in age and elite categories.

In 2023, he was the subject of several major podcasts and articles in specialized publications such as SwimSwam and Swimming World, where he shared his training philosophy and strategies for developing athletes from a young age to world-class level.

== Notable students ==
- Summer McIntosh – multiple Olympic champion (2020, 2024), holder of multiple world records, including in individual medley and freestyle. She has been training under Arckey at the Sarasota Sharks club since 2022. In 2025, she departed from the club to team up with Bob Bowman, who coaches both Michael Phelps and recently, León Marchand.
- Emma Weyant – Olympic medalist, multiple medalist at the World Championships, trainee of the Sarasota Sharks club and student of Arckey.
- Ryan Murphy – four-time Olympic champion, multiple world champion, former world record holder.
- Katie Shanahan – U.S. champion in her age category.

== Achievements and awards ==
In 2017, Arckey was named Junior Coach of the Year by USA Swimming. Under his leadership, athletes from the Sarasota Sharks club have repeatedly won national and international competitions among juniors and adults. Arckey was inducted into the Florida Swimming Hall of Fame for his contribution to the development of swimming at the local and national levels.

In 2022, he was awarded an honorary certificate from Swimming World Magazine for his significant contribution to the training of Olympic champions.

He is regularly included in lists of the best coaches in the United States according to various specialized publications.

== Personal life ==
Arckey and his wife have two children. He enjoys fishing and traveling, often combining leisure with attending various international sporting events.

He is also actively involved in charitable and educational projects aimed at supporting youth and developing swimming in the United States.
