= Swimming at the 2018 Summer Youth Olympics – Girls' 200 metre butterfly =

Girls' 200 metre butterfly at the 2018 Summer Youth Olympics
- Venue: Natatorium
- Dates: 8 October
- Competitors: 16 from 15 nations
- Winning time: 2:10.37

Medalists
gold medal	Blanka Berecz	Hungary
silver medal	Duné Coetzee	South Africa
bronze medal	Michaela Ryan	Australia

The girls' 200 metre butterfly event at the 2018 Summer Youth Olympics took place on 8 October at the Natatorium in Buenos Aires, Argentina.

== Results ==
=== Heats ===
The heats were started at 10:48.

Rank	Heat	Lane	Name	Nationality	Time	Notes
1	1	3	Duné Coetzee	South Africa	2:12.41	Q
2	2	4	Blanka Berecz	Hungary	2:12.62	Q
3	2	3	María Román	Colombia	2:13.57	Q
4	1	5	Laura Lahtinen	Finland	2:14.17	Q
5	2	6	Maria Pessanha	Brazil	2:14.83	Q
6	2	2	Azzahra Permatahani	Indonesia	2:15.17	Q
7	1	4	Michaela Ryan	Australia	2:15.89	Q
8	2	5	Adinda Larasati Dewi	Indonesia	2:16.87	Q
9	1	6	Yuliia Stadnyk	Ukraine	2:16.94	
10	2	7	Cyrielle Duhamel	France	2:18.26	
11	1	2	Lea Polonsky	Israel	2:20.58	
12	1	7	Lin Xintong	China	2:20.98	
13	2	1	Miriam Guevara	Mexico	2:22.66	
14	2	8	Jennifer Ramírez	Honduras	2:22.72	
15	1	1	Aleyna Özkan	Turkey	2:22.82	
16	1	8	Katie Rock	Albania	2:33.06	

=== Final ===
The final was held at 18:04.

Rank	Lane	Name	Nationality	Time	Notes
1st place, gold medalist(s)	5	Blanka Berecz	Hungary	2:10.37	
2nd place, silver medalist(s)	4	Duné Coetzee	South Africa	2:11.71	
3rd place, bronze medalist(s)	1	Michaela Ryan	Australia	2:13.12	
4	3	María Román	Colombia	2:13.17	
5	6	Laura Lahtinen	Finland	2:13.51	
6	2	Maria Pessanha	Brazil	2:14.56	
7	8	Adinda Larasati Dewi	Indonesia	2:15.23	
8	7	Azzahra Permatahani	Indonesia	2:17.03	
