= Swimming at the 2022 Commonwealth Games – Women's 400 metre individual medley =

Event held on 29 July at the Sandwell Aquatics Centre

Women's 400 metre individual medley at the 2022 Commonwealth Games
- Venue: Sandwell Aquatics Centre
- Dates: 29 July
- Competitors: 10 from 7 nations
- Winning time: 4:29.01 GR

Medalists
gold medal	Summer McIntosh	Canada
silver medal	Kiah Melverton	Australia
bronze medal	Katie Shanahan	Scotland

The women's 400 metre individual medley event at the 2022 Commonwealth Games was held on 29 July at the Sandwell Aquatics Centre.

== Records ==
Prior to this competition, the existing world, Commonwealth and Games records were as follows:

World record	Katinka Hosszú (HUN)	4:26.36	Rio de Janeiro, Brazil	6 August 2016
Commonwealth record	Summer McIntosh (CAN)	4:29.12	Toronto, Canada	4 March 2022
Games record	Hannah Miley (SCO)	4:31.76	Glasgow, United Kingdom	24 July 2014

== Schedule ==
The schedule is as follows:

All times are British Summer Time (UTC+1)

Date	Time	Round
Friday 29 July 2022	10:47	Qualifying
Friday 29 July 2022	19:15	Final

== Results ==
=== Heats ===
Rank	Heat	Lane	Name	Nationality	Time	Notes
1	1	4	Summer McIntosh	Canada	4:36.72	Q
2	1	5	Kiah Melverton	Australia	4:41.44	Q
3	1	3	Ella Jansen	Canada	4:42.02	Q
4	2	3	Freya Colbert	England	4:42.64	Q
5	2	4	Tessa Cieplucha	Canada	4:42.99	Q
6	2	6	Mya Rasmussen	New Zealand	4:43.87	Q
7	1	6	Katie Shanahan	Scotland	4:46.19	Q
8	2	5	Jenna Forrester	Australia	4:46.28	Q
9	2	2	Rebecca Meder	South Africa	4:51.65	R
10	1	2	Adara Stoddard	Barbados	5:24.94	R

=== Final ===
Rank	Lane	Name	Nationality	Time	Notes
1st place, gold medalist(s)	4	Summer McIntosh	Canada	4:29.01	WJR, AM, CR
2nd place, silver medalist(s)	5	Kiah Melverton	Australia	4:36.78	
3rd place, bronze medalist(s)	1	Katie Shanahan	Scotland	4:39.37	
4	6	Freya Colbert	England	4:39.80	
5	3	Ella Jansen	Canada	4:40.17	
6	8	Jenna Forrester	Australia	4:41.80	
7	7	Mya Rasmussen	New Zealand	4:41.81	
8	2	Tessa Cieplucha	Canada	4:42.27	
