= Duné Coetzee =

South African swimmer (born 2002)

Personal information
- Nationality: South African
- Born: 14 May 2002 (age 24) Pretoria, South Africa

Sport
- Sport: Swimming
- Strokes: Freestyle, butterfly
- College team: University of Georgia
Medal record
Women's swimming
Representing South Africa
Youth Olympic Games
Silver medal – second place	2018 Buenos Aires	200 m butterfly
World University Games
Silver medal – second place	2021 Chengdu	800 m freestyle

Duné Coetzee (born 14 May 2002) is a South African swimmer. She competed in the women's 400 metre freestyle at the 2019 World Aquatics Championships. She also competed in the women's 4 x 200 metres freestyle relay at the 2020 Summer Olympics.

In May 2022, Coetzee qualified for the 2022 World Aquatics Championships at the 2022 South Africa National Swimming Championships in the 200 metre freestyle, 400 metre freestyle, and 200 metre butterfly. The following month, she was named as one of the female swimmers representing South Africa for the 2022 Commonwealth Games.

For the 100 metre butterfly, with preliminaries on day one of swimming at the 2022 Commonwealth Games in Birmingham, England, Coetzee was one of three South Africans to qualify for the semifinals, along with Erin Gallagher and Trinity Hearne. In the semifinals, she finished in 1:00.51 and placed fifteenth overall. Two days later, she contributed a split time of 1:59.49 to the 4×200 metre freestyle relay, helping finish fourth in 8:02.28. On 2 August, she placed tenth in the 200 metre butterfly with a time of 2:12.40. On the final day, 3 August, she ranked eighth in the preliminaries of the 400 metre freestyle, qualifying for the final with a time of 4:14.92. She swam a 4:15.53 in the final and placed eighth.

== Background ==
Coetzee started attending the University of Georgia in 2021, where she competes collegiately as part of the Georgia Bulldogs swim team.
