= 2023 U.S. Open Swimming Championships =

Swimming competition in the United States

2023 Toyota U.S. Open Championships
- Host city: Greensboro, North Carolina, United States
- Date(s): November 29 – December 2
- Venue(s): Greensboro Aquatic Center
- Events: 28

The 2023 Toyota U.S. Open Swimming Championships took place from November 29 to December 2, 2023, at Greensboro Aquatic Center in Greensboro, North Carolina, United States. Competition was conducted in a long course (50-meter) pool. Swimmers were allowed to compete representing their country, such as Hong Kong, national swimming federation, such as Swimming Canada, club, such as Nation's Capital Swim Club, or unattached.

== Results ==
=== Men ===
Event	Gold		Silver		Bronze	
50 m freestyle	Michael Andrew; Michael Andrew Swim Academy	21.80	Joshua Liendo; University of Florida	21.90	Mikel Schreuders; Ecercle des Nage	21.93; OQT
100 m freestyle	Matt King; Texas Ford Aquatics	48.30	Ryan Held; New York Athletic Club	48.36	Chris Guiliano; University of Notre Dame	48.51
200 m freestyle	Rafael Miroslaw; Indiana University	1:45.92 =CR	Drew Kibler; Sun Devil Swimming	1:46.12	Henry McFadden; Jersey Wahoos	1:46.80
400 m freestyle	Drew Kibler; Sun Devil Swimming	3:47.58	Kieran Smith; Ridgefield Athletic Club	3:48.72	Ilia Sibirtzev; University of Louisville	3:48.99
800 m freestyle	Charlie Clark; Ohio State University	7:50.49	David Johnston; The Swim Team	7:53.87	Ilia Sibirtzev; University of Louisville	7:54.36
1500 m freestyle	Bobby Finke; Saint Petersburg	15:03.97	Charlie Clark; Ohio State University	15:05.57	Luke Whitlock; Fishers Area Swimming Tigers	15:08.09
100 m backstroke	Hubert Kos; Arizona State University	53.19	Hunter Armstrong; New York Athletic Club	53.72	Ryan Murphy; California Aquatics	53.74
200 m backstroke	Hubert Kos; Arizona State University	1:55.95	Kieran Smith; Ridgefield Athletic Club	1:57.51	Kai van Westering; Indiana University	1:58.63
100 m breaststroke	Denis Petrashov; University of Louisville	59.46	Michael Andrew; Michael Andrew Swim Academy	59.52	Nick Fink; Dallas Mustangs	59.79
200 m breaststroke	Matt Fallon; University of Pennsylvania	2:09.49; CR	Cody Miller; Sandpipers of Nevada	2:09.84	Josh Matheny; Indiana University	2:10.49
100 m butterfly	Caeleb Dressel; Gator Swim Club	51.31	Joshua Liendo; University of Florida	51.32	Ilya Kharun; Sun Devil Swimming	51.42
200 m butterfly	Ilya Kharun; Sun Devil Swimming	1:54.66; CR	Martin Espernberger; University of Tennessee	1:54.69	Trenton Julian; Mission Viejo Nadadores	1:55.59
200 m individual medley	Chase Kalisz; Sun Devil Swimming	1:57.43	Hubert Kos; Arizona State University	1:57.88	Trenton Julian; Mission Viejo Nadadores	1:58.46
400 m individual medley	Chase Kalisz; Sun Devil Swimming	4:10.42	Carson Foster; Mason Manta Rays	4:13.43	Jay Litherland; Sun Devil Swimming	4:14.50

=== Women ===
Event	Gold		Silver		Bronze	
50 m freestyle	Kate Douglass; New York Athletic Club	24.38; CR	Abbey Weitzeil; California Aquatics Torri Huske; Arlington Aquatic Club	24.41	none awarded	
100 m freestyle	Siobhan Haughey; Hong Kong	52.94; CR	Torri Huske; Arlington Aquatic Club	53.17	Abbey Weitzeil; California Aquatics	53.53
200 m freestyle	Siobhan Haughey; Hong Kong	1:54.20; CR	Katie Ledecky; Gator Swim Club	1:56.29	Simone Manuel; Sun Devil Swimming	1:57.37
400 m freestyle	Summer McIntosh; Sarasota Sharks	3:59.42; CR	Katie Ledecky; Gator Swim Club	4:02.38	Siobhan Haughey; Hong Kong	4:06.32
800 m freestyle	Katie Ledecky; Gator Swim Club	8:15.91	Paige Madden; New York Athletic Club	8:29.91	Jillian Cox; University of Texas at Austin	8:33.77
1500 m freestyle	Katie Ledecky; Gator Swim Club	15:46.38	Paige Madden; New York Athletic Club	16:11.26	Leah Smith; Longhorn Aquatics	16:15.45
100 m backstroke	Regan Smith; Sun Devil Swimming	58.16	Claire Curzan; TAC Titans	58.35	Katharine Berkoff; NC State University	58.61
200 m backstroke	Regan Smith; Sun Devil Swimming	2:04.27; CR	Claire Curzan; TAC Titans	2:06.39	Summer McIntosh; Sarasota Sharks	2:06.81
100 m breaststroke	Siobhan Haughey; Hong Kong	1:06.05	Lydia Jacoby; Seward Tsunami	1:06.20	Kotryna Teterevkova; Lithuania	1:06.96
200 m breaststroke	Kate Douglass; New York Athletic Club	2:21.87; CR	Lilly King; Indiana Swim Club	2:23.98	Kotryna Teterevkova; Lithuania	2:24.22
100 m butterfly	Torri Huske; Arlington Aquatic Club	56.21; CR	Claire Curzan; TAC Titans	56.76	Gretchen Walsh; University of Virginia	56.85
200 m butterfly	Regan Smith; Sun Devil Swimming	2:06.72; CR	Lindsay Looney; Sun Devil Swimming	2:09.31	Dakota Luther; Longhorn Aquatics	2:10.17
200 m individual medley	Kate Douglass; New York Athletic Club	2:08.46	Alex Walsh; University of Virginia	2:08.96	Torri Huske; Arlington Aquatic Club	2:09.10
400 m individual medley	Summer McIntosh; Sarasota Sharks	4:29.96	Anastasia Gorbenko; Unattached	4:37.90	Regan Smith; Sun Devil Swimming	4:38.77

== Records set ==
=== World records set ===
Day	Event	Stage	Time	Name	Country	Date	Type	Age	Ref

=== National records set ===
Day	Event	Stage	Time	Name	Country	Date	Type	Age	Ref

=== Championships records set ===
Day	Event	Stage	Time	Name	Country	Date	Ref
2	400 m freestyle (Women's)	Final	3:59.42	Summer McIntosh	Canada	November 30, 2023	
2	200 m individual medley (Men's)	B Final	1:56.06	Shaine Casas	United States	November 30, 2023	
2	50 m freestyle (Women's)	Final	24.38	Kate Douglass	United States	November 30, 2023	
3	100 m butterfly (Women's)	Final	56.21	Torri Huske	United States	December 1, 2023	
3	100 m butterfly (Men's)	B Final	51.03	Shaine Casas	United States	December 1, 2023	
3	200 m freestyle (Women's)	Final	1:54.20	Siobhán Haughey	Hong Kong	December 1, 2023	
3	200 m freestyle (Men's)	Final	1:45.92	Rafael Miroslaw	Germany	December 1, 2023	
4	200 m butterfly (Men's)	Heats	1:54.88	Michal Chmielewski	Poland	December 2, 2023	
4	200 m backstroke (Women's)	Final	2:04.27	Regan Smith	United States	December 2, 2023	
4	100 m freestyle (Women's)	Final	52.94	Siobhán Haughey	Hong Kong	December 2, 2023	
4	200 m breaststroke (Women's)	Final	2:21.87	Kate Douglass	United States	December 2, 2023	
4	200 m breaststroke (Men's)	Final	2:09.49	Matt Fallon	United States	December 2, 2023	
4	200 m butterfly (Women's)	Final	2:06.72	Regan Smith	United States	December 2, 2023	
4	200 m butterfly (Men's)	Final	1:54.66	Ilya Kharun	Canada	December 2, 2023	
