= Swimming at the 2022 Commonwealth Games – Women's 400 metre freestyle =

Women's 400 metre freestyle at the 2022 Commonwealth Games
- Venue: Sandwell Aquatics Centre
- Dates: 3 August
- Competitors: 23 from 14 nations
- Winning time: 3:58.06

Medalists
| gold medal | Ariarne Titmus | Australia |
| silver medal | Summer McIntosh | Canada |
| bronze medal | Kiah Melverton | Australia |

The women's 400 metre freestyle event at the 2022 Commonwealth Games was held on 3 August at the Sandwell Aquatics Centre.

== Records ==
Prior to this competition, the existing world, Commonwealth and Games records were as follows:

| World record | Ariarne Titmus (AUS) | 3:56.40 | Adelaide, Australia | 22 May 2022 |
| Commonwealth record | Ariarne Titmus (AUS) | 3:56.40 | Adelaide, Australia | 22 May 2022 |
| Games record | Ariarne Titmus (AUS) | 4:00.93 | Gold Coast, Australia | 10 April 2018 |

The following records were established during the competition:

| Date | Event | Name | Nationality | Time | Record |
|---|---|---|---|---|---|
| 3 August | Final | Ariarne Titmus | Australia | 3:58.06 | GR |

== Schedule ==
The schedule is as follows:

All times are British Summer Time (UTC+1)

| Date | Time | Round |
|---|---|---|
| Wednesday 3 August 2022 | 10:44 | Qualifying |
| Wednesday 3 August 2022 | 20:48 | Final |

== Results ==
=== Heats ===
| Rank | Heat | Lane | Name | Nationality | Time | Notes |
|---|---|---|---|---|---|---|
| 1 | 3 | 5 | Erika Fairweather | New Zealand | 4:07.27 | Q |
| 2 | 3 | 4 | Summer McIntosh | Canada | 4:07.36 | Q |
| 3 | 4 | 4 | Ariarne Titmus | Australia | 4:08.25 | Q |
| 4 | 4 | 5 | Lani Pallister | Australia | 4:09.77 | Q |
| 5 | 3 | 2 | Ella Jansen | Canada | 4:11.02 | Q |
| 6 | 4 | 3 | Kiah Melverton | Australia | 4:11.04 | Q |
| 7 | 3 | 3 | Eve Thomas | New Zealand | 4:11.50 | Q |
| 8 | 4 | 7 | Duné Coetzee | South Africa | 4:14.92 | Q |
| 9 | 4 | 2 | Katrina Bellio | Canada | 4:15.37 | R |
| 10 | 3 | 6 | Freya Colbert | England | 4:16.31 | R |
| 11 | 3 | 7 | Michaela Pulford | South Africa | 4:18.76 | |
| 12 | 3 | 8 | Trinity Hearne | South Africa | 4:26.22 | |
| 13 | 2 | 5 | Harper Barrowman | Cayman Islands | 4:28.02 | |
| 14 | 3 | 1 | Kyra Rabess | Cayman Islands | 4:30.11 | |
| 15 | 2 | 4 | Mollie McAlorum | Northern Ireland | 4:32.31 | |
| 16 | 4 | 8 | Lily Scott | Jersey | 4:35.04 | |
| 17 | 2 | 3 | Jehanara Nabi | Pakistan | 4:36.87 | |
| 18 | 2 | 6 | Raya Embury-Brown | Cayman Islands | 4:41.74 | |
| 19 | 2 | 2 | Kiera Prentice | Isle of Man | 4:48.86 | |
| 20 | 2 | 7 | Tilly Collymore | Grenada | 4:48.97 | |
| 21 | 1 | 4 | Aaliyah Palestrini | Seychelles | 4:59.62 | |
| 22 | 1 | 5 | Poppy Davis-Coyle | Saint Helena | 5:09.83 | |
| 23 | 1 | 3 | Charissa Panuve | Tonga | 5:13.63 | |
| | 4 | 1 | Tamryn van Selm | England | DNS | |
| | 4 | 6 | Freya Anderson | England | DNS | |

=== Final ===
| Rank | Lane | Name | Nationality | Time | Notes |
|---|---|---|---|---|---|
| 1st place, gold medalist(s) | 3 | Ariarne Titmus | Australia | 3:58.06 | GR |
| 2nd place, silver medalist(s) | 5 | Summer McIntosh | Canada | 3:59.32 | NR |
| 3rd place, bronze medalist(s) | 7 | Kiah Melverton | Australia | 4:03.12 | |
| 4 | 4 | Erika Fairweather | New Zealand | 4:03.84 | |
| 5 | 6 | Lani Pallister | Australia | 4:04.43 | |
| 6 | 1 | Eve Thomas | New Zealand | 4:09.73 | |
| 7 | 2 | Ella Jansen | Canada | 4:10.69 | |
| 8 | 8 | Duné Coetzee | South Africa | 4:15.53 | |
