= Kiah Melverton =

Australian swimmer (born 1996)

Personal information
- Nationality: Australian
- Born: 5 November 1996 (age 29) Southport, Queensland, Australia
- Height: 173 cm (5 ft 8 in)
- Weight: 62 kg (137 lb)

Sport
- Sport: Swimming
- Strokes: Freestyle
- Club: St Peters Western
- Coach: Dean Boxall
Medal record
Women's swimming
Representing Australia
World Championships (LC)
Gold medal – first place	2019 Gwangju	4×200 m freestyle
Gold medal – first place	2023 Fukuoka	4×200 m freestyle
Silver medal – second place	2022 Budapest	800 m freestyle
Silver medal – second place	2022 Budapest	4×200 m freestyle
Bronze medal – third place	2024 Doha	4×200 m freestyle
World Championships (SC)
Bronze medal – third place	2016 Windsor	800 m freestyle
Commonwealth Games
Gold medal – first place	2022 Birmingham	4×200 m freestyle
Silver medal – second place	2022 Birmingham	800 m freestyle
Silver medal – second place	2022 Birmingham	400 m medley
Bronze medal – third place	2018 Gold Coast	800 m freestyle
Bronze medal – third place	2022 Birmingham	400 m freestyle
Pan Pacific Championships
Silver medal – second place	2018 Tokyo	1500 m freestyle

Kiah Melverton (born 5 November 1996) is an Australian swimmer.

== 2015 season ==
She won double bronze at the 2015 Summer Universiade in the 800 metres and 1500 metres.

== 2016 season ==
At the 2016 Australian Swimming Championships, Melverton won bronze in the 400 metre freestyle.

In November 2016, Melverton competed in the 2016 Australian Short Course Swimming Championships which acted as selection trials for the 2016 FINA World Swimming Championships (25 m) held in Windsor, Ontario, Canada. At these championships, she earned silver in the 400 metre freestyle and gold in the 800 metre freestyle, earning a national championship and her Australian senior team debut.

Competing at the 2016 FINA World Swimming Championships (25 m), Melverton won bronze in the 800 metre freestyle. In earning the bronze, she swam a personal best time of 8:16.51.

== Open water swimming ==
Melverton is also an accomplished open water swimmer.

In October 2016, she competed in the Burleigh Ocean Swim, taking out the women's 1k and 2k events.

At the 2017 Australian Open Water Swimming Championships held in Adelaide, South Australia, Melverton took gold in the women's 5k event, earning nomination for selection for the 17th FINA World Aquatics Championships to be held in Budapest, Hungary in July 2017.

== World records ==
=== Long course metres ===
No.	Event	Time	Meet	Location	Date	Status	Ref
1	4x200 m freestyle relay^{[a]}	7:39.29	2022 Commonwealth Games	Birmingham, United Kingdom	31 July 2022	Former	

^{a} split 1:55.40 (2nd leg); with Madison Wilson (1st leg), Mollie O'Callaghan (3rd leg), Ariarne Titmus (4th leg)
