= Ella Jansen =

Canadian swimmer (born 2005)

Personal information
- Full name: Ella Christina Jansen
- Born: September 1, 2005 (age 20) Burlington, Ontario, Canada
- Height: 173 cm (5 ft 8 in)

Sport
- Sport: Swimming
- Club: High Performance Center Toronto
Medal record
Women's swimming
Representing Canada
World Championships (LC)
Bronze medal – third place	2024 Doha	4×100 m freestyle
Commonwealth Games
Silver medal – second place	2022 Birmingham	4×200 m freestyle
Bronze medal – third place	2022 Birmingham	4×100 m mixed freestyle
World Junior Championships
Silver medal – second place	2023 Netanya	200 m medley
Silver medal – second place	2023 Netanya	4×100 m medley
Bronze medal – third place	2023 Netanya	4×100 m freestyle
Bronze medal – third place	2023 Netanya	4×200 m freestyle
Bronze medal – third place	2023 Netanya	4×100 m mixed freestyle
Junior Pan Pacific Championships
Bronze medal – third place	2022 Honolulu	4×100 m freestyle

Ella Christina Jansen (born September 1, 2005) is a Canadian competitive swimmer specializing in freestyle, butterfly and individual medley events.

== Career ==
A native of Burlington, Ontario, Jansen started swimming for the Burlington Aquatic Devilrays (BAD) at the age of 6 years old. She quickly moved through the levels and started competing at the Provincial level at the age of 8 years old breaking many club records along the way. In 2019 Jansen started training at the Etobicoke Swimming club under Kevin Thornburn. She attended Notre Dame Catholic Secondary School and participated in high school swimming in the season of 2019/2020. At the 2020 OFSAA (Ontario Federation of School Athletic Associations) Jansen beat Victoria Kwan's 2013 OFSAA record of 2:00.40 in the 200 free SC by swimming a time of 1:59.98. She was featured by CTV news that same day.

She competed at the swimming trials for the Canadian team for the 2020 Summer Olympics in Tokyo, with her highest finish being fourth in both the 1500 metre freestyle and the 200 metre butterfly, in the latter breaking the Ontario age group record previously set by Penny Oleksiak. She did not qualify for the Olympic team, noting afterwards that it was "not quite how I wanted it to go but each day it got a little better and overall, it was an amazing experience."

Jansen recorded notable results domestically in 2022, winning bronze medals at the Canadian national trials in the 200 metre butterfly, 400 metre freestyle, and 400 metre individual medley. While she did not qualify for the World team, she was named to the Canadian team for the 2022 Commonwealth Games in Birmingham, as well as for the Junior Pan Pacific Swimming Championships in Honolulu. She and teammate Katrina Bellio then lead Etobicoke Swimming club to victory at the Eastern Canadian Championships. Competing in Birmingham as a 16-year old, she made her first major international final, coming fifth in the 400 m individual medley with a time of 4:40.17. Assessing the result afterward, Jansen said "the goal today was just to make the final. I wanted the time to be under 4:40 so there’s still a lot of room to improve." Jansen swam for the Canadian team in the heats of the 4×100 m mixed freestyle relay, helping them qualify to the final. She was replaced by Rebecca Smith in the final, but shared in the team's bronze medal win. She later was part of the finals team in the 4×200 m freestyle relay, swimming the second leg and winning a silver medal. This was Jansen's first major international podium, of which she said she "didn't expect it going into the meet. It was all so amazing to swim with the girls and get the medal." She also reached the final of the 400 m freestyle and placed seventh with a time of 4:10.69, stating that she had come up just short of her goal of going under the 4 minute and 10 second mark. Swimming Canada subsequently named her their Breakout Swimmer of the Year for 2022.

In September 2022, Jansen moved to train at High Performance Center in Scarborough under Ryan Mallette and Rob Novak. At the 2023 Canadian trials, she succeeded in qualifying for the World team for the first time, earning assignments to the 2023 edition in Fukuoka. In her lone individual event, she came twenty-second in the heats of the 400 m freestyle. She went on to swim for Canada in the heats of the 4 × 200 m freestyle relay. Jansen was also named to the Canadian team for the 2023 World Aquatics Junior Swimming Championships in Netanya, where she won an individual silver medal in the 400 m individual medley to begin, followed by a bronze with the 4 × 200 m freestyle relay team. She would go on to win three additional relay medals.

While many of Canada's top swimmers opted to skip the 2024 World Aquatics Championships in Doha, Jansen was named to the team. She was part of the Canadian team in the heats of the 4 × 100 m freestyle relay, helping them advance to the final. She was replaced there by Katerine Savard, but shared in the team's eventual bronze medal win; this was Jansen's first World Aquatics medal. At the 2024 Summer Olympics, she finished 11th in the Women's 400 metre individual medley, missing the final, and 4th as part of the Women's 4 × 200 metre freestyle relay, swimming both heats and finals.
