= Swimming at the 2023 World Aquatics Championships – Women's 400 metre freestyle =

Women's 400 metre freestyle at the 2023 World Aquatics Championships
- Venue: Marine Messe Fukuoka
- Location: Fukuoka, Japan
- Dates: 23 July (heats and final)
- Competitors: 41 from 31 nations
- Winning time: 3:55.38 WR

Medalists
| gold medal | Ariarne Titmus | Australia |
| silver medal | Katie Ledecky | United States |
| bronze medal | Erika Fairweather | New Zealand |

The women's 400 metre freestyle competition at the 2023 World Aquatics Championships was held on 23 July 2023.

== Records ==
Prior to the competition, the existing world and championship records were as follows.

| World record | Summer McIntosh (CAN) | 3:56.08 | Toronto, Canada | 28 March 2023 |
| Competition record | Katie Ledecky (USA) | 3:58.15 | Budapest, Hungary | 18 June 2022 |

The following new records were set during this competition.

| Date | Event | Name | Nationality | Time | Record |
|---|---|---|---|---|---|
| 23 July | Final | Ariarne Titmus | Australia | 3:55.38 | WR |

== Results ==
=== Heats ===
The heats were started at 11:56.

| Rank | Heat | Lane | Name | Nationality | Time | Notes |
|---|---|---|---|---|---|---|
| 1 | 5 | 5 | Katie Ledecky | United States | 4:00.80 | Q |
| 2 | 4 | 4 | Ariarne Titmus | Australia | 4:01.39 | Q |
| 3 | 5 | 4 | Summer McIntosh | Canada | 4:01.72 | Q |
| 4 | 4 | 6 | Isabel Gose | Germany | 4:03.02 | Q, NR |
| 5 | 4 | 5 | Erika Fairweather | New Zealand | 4:03.07 | Q |
| 6 | 4 | 3 | Lani Pallister | Australia | 4:03.49 | Q |
| 7 | 5 | 6 | Bella Sims | United States | 4:04.25 | Q |
| 8 | 5 | 3 | Li Bingjie | China | 4:04.98 | Q |
| 9 | 5 | 1 | Ajna Késely | Hungary | 4:07.08 | |
| 10 | 4 | 1 | Waka Kobori | Japan | 4:07.48 | |
| 11 | 4 | 7 | Gabrielle Roncatto | Brazil | 4:07.99 | |
| 12 | 4 | 8 | Maria Fernanda Costa | Brazil | 4:08.67 | |
| 13 | 5 | 8 | Freya Colbert | Great Britain | 4:09.02 | |
| 14 | 4 | 9 | Anastasiya Kirpichnikova | France | 4:09.43 | |
| 15 | 3 | 5 | Valentine Dumont | Belgium | 4:10.09 | |
| 16 | 5 | 2 | Miyu Namba | Japan | 4:10.23 | |
| 17 | 4 | 2 | Ma Yonghui | China | 4:10.64 | |
| 18 | 3 | 1 | Han Da-kyung | South Korea | 4:11.08 | |
| 19 | 3 | 3 | Deniz Ertan | Turkey | 4:11.29 | |
| 20 | 5 | 7 | Eve Thomas | New Zealand | 4:11.33 | |
| 21 | 3 | 2 | Imani de Jong | Netherlands | 4:12.03 | |
| 22 | 5 | 0 | Ella Jansen | Canada | 4:12.77 | |
| 23 | 5 | 9 | Bettina Fábián | Hungary | 4:12.83 | |
| 24 | 3 | 9 | Gan Ching Hwee | Singapore | 4:13.10 | |
| 25 | 3 | 0 | Marlene Kahler | Austria | 4:13.13 | |
| 26 | 4 | 0 | Merve Tuncel | Turkey | 4:13.34 | |
| 27 | 3 | 8 | Daria Golovaty | Israel | 4:14.33 | |
| 28 | 3 | 7 | Paula Otero | Spain | 4:14.63 | |
| 29 | 2 | 4 | María Yegres | Venezuela | 4:15.79 | |
| 30 | 3 | 6 | Cyrielle Duhamel | France | 4:16.97 | |
| 31 | 3 | 4 | Katja Fain | Slovenia | 4:18.05 | |
| 32 | 2 | 6 | Iman Avdić | Bosnia and Herzegovina | 4:20.04 | |
| 33 | 2 | 5 | Batbayaryn Enkhkhüslen | Mongolia | 4:21.39 | |
| 34 | 2 | 3 | Võ Thị Mỹ Tiên | Vietnam | 4:23.21 | |
| 35 | 2 | 2 | Eva Petrovska | North Macedonia | 4:24.92 | |
| 36 | 2 | 1 | Harper Barrowman | Cayman Islands | 4:26.88 | |
| 37 | 2 | 8 | Danielle Treasure | Barbados | 4:32.39 | |
| 38 | 2 | 7 | Sasha Gatt | Malta | 4:35.45 | |
| 39 | 1 | 3 | Anna Nikishkina | Kyrgyzstan | 4:36.12 | |
| 40 | 1 | 4 | Natalia Kuipers | U.S. Virgin Islands | 4:38.00 | |
| 41 | 1 | 5 | Amaya Bollinger | Guam | 5:16.50 | |

=== Final ===
The final was started at 20:32.

| Rank | Lane | Name | Nationality | Time | Notes |
|---|---|---|---|---|---|
| 1st place, gold medalist(s) | 5 | Ariarne Titmus | Australia | 3:55.38 | WR |
| 2nd place, silver medalist(s) | 4 | Katie Ledecky | United States | 3:58.73 | |
| 3rd place, bronze medalist(s) | 2 | Erika Fairweather | New Zealand | 3:59.59 | NR |
| 4 | 3 | Summer McIntosh | Canada | 3:59.94 | |
| 5 | 8 | Li Bingjie | China | 4:01.65 | |
| 6 | 7 | Lani Pallister | Australia | 4:05.17 | |
| 7 | 6 | Isabel Gose | Germany | 4:05.27 | |
| 8 | 1 | Bella Sims | United States | 4:05.37 | |
