= Mary-Sophie Harvey =

Canadian swimmer (born 1999)

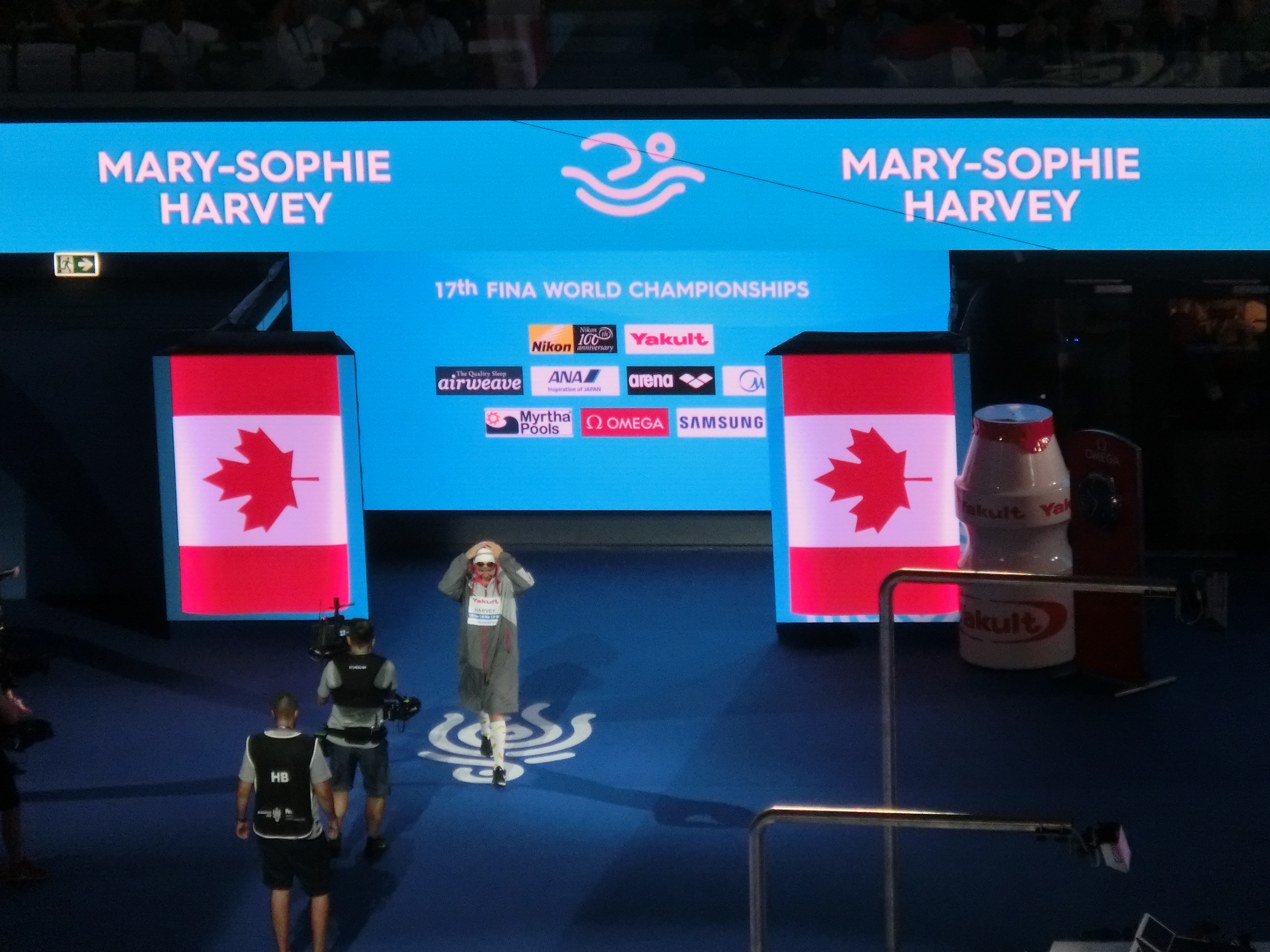
- Harvey at the 2017 World Championships

Personal information
- Born: 11 August 1999 (age 27) Laval, Quebec, Canada
- Height: 178 cm (5 ft 10 in)
- Weight: 72 kg (159 lb)

Sport
- Sport: Swimming
- Strokes: Freestyle, Individual medley
- Club: Energy Standard International Swim Club
Medal record
Women's swimming
Representing Canada
World Championships (LC)
Bronze medal – third place	2022 Budapest	4×200 m freestyle
Bronze medal – third place	2023 Fukuoka	4×100 m medley
Bronze medal – third place	2025 Singapore	200 m medley
World Championships (SC)
Silver medal – second place	2022 Melbourne	4×200 m freestyle
Silver medal – second place	2024 Budapest	200 m freestyle
Silver medal – second place	2024 Budapest	4×50 m mixed freestyle
Bronze medal – third place	2022 Melbourne	4×100 m freestyle
Bronze medal – third place	2024 Budapest	400 m freestyle
Bronze medal – third place	2024 Budapest	4×100 m freestyle
Bronze medal – third place	2024 Budapest	4×100 m mixed medley
Pan Pacific Championships
Bronze medal – third place	2026 Irvine	4×100 m freestyle
Bronze medal – third place	2026 Irvine	4×200 m freestyle
Commonwealth Games
Silver medal – second place	2022 Birmingham	4×200 m freestyle
Bronze medal – third place	2022 Birmingham	4×100 m mixed freestyle
Pan American Games
Gold medal – first place	2023 Santiago	200 m freestyle
Gold medal – first place	2023 Santiago	4×100 m freestyle
Gold medal – first place	2023 Santiago	4×100 m medley
Silver medal – second place	2019 Lima	200 m butterfly
Silver medal – second place	2019 Lima	4×200 m freestyle
Silver medal – second place	2019 Lima	4×100 m medley
Silver medal – second place	2023 Santiago	200 m medley
Bronze medal – third place	2019 Lima	400 m medley
Bronze medal – third place	2023 Santiago	4×200 m freestyle
Bronze medal – third place	2023 Santiago	4×100 m mixed freestyle
World Junior Championships
Silver medal – second place	2015 Singapore	200 m medley
Silver medal – second place	2015 Singapore	4×200 m freestyle
Bronze medal – third place	2015 Singapore	4×100 m freestyle
Junior Pan Pacific Championships
Gold medal – first place	2016 Maui	200 m medley
Silver medal – second place	2014 Maui	200 m medley
Silver medal – second place	2016 Maui	4×100 m freestyle
Bronze medal – third place	2014 Maui	4×100 m medley
Bronze medal – third place	2016 Maui	400 m medley

Mary-Sophie Harvey (born 11 August 1999) is a Canadian swimmer who competes primarily in freestyle and individual medley events. A three-time World Aquatics medallist, seven-time World Swimming Championships medallist, and three-time Pan American Games champion, Harvey represented Canada at the 2020 and 2024 Summer Olympics.

== Career ==
=== 2015–2021 ===
Harvey first appeared on the international junior swimming circuit, representing Canada at two editions of the FINA World Junior Swimming Championships, achieving her best results at the 2015 edition in Singapore, where she won the silver medal in the 200 m freestyle and collected two medals as part of the Canadian girls' teams in the 4×100 and 4×200 m freestyle relays. She competed at the Canadian swimming trials for the 2016 Olympic team, but did not qualify. The following year she qualified for the 2017 World Aquatics Championships, competing in the women's 200 metre freestyle event. Shortly afterward in September 2017, Harvey was named in the Canadian team for the 2018 Commonwealth Games. Her most notable feat at the Commonwealth Games was reaching the final of the 400 m individual medley, where she finished eighth.

In the midst of struggles with eating disorder and a lingering shoulder injury, Harvey was not chosen for the Canadian team for the 2019 World Aquatics Championships, which prompted her to consider retiring from competitive swimming. She was assigned to the 2019 Pan American Games in Lima, which Harvey would later say "I thought I'd be happy about that but afterwards I still felt empty." A month before the Pan American Games, she attempted suicide, but after hospitalization and recovery was able to attend the event. She won four medals, three of them silver. Speaking years later, she credited this as a turning point in her life, explaining: "It was not like everything was great and everything was fixed but I could get excited about future teams." In the autumn of 2019, Harvey was member of the inaugural International Swimming League swimming for the Energy Standard International Swim Club, who won the team title in Las Vegas, Nevada in December. During the first stop of the tour in Indianapolis, USA, Harvey raced the most metres (1,400m) of any athlete. At the second stop in Naples, ITA she raced 1,200m which was equal furthest racing distance with 3 other athletes. Across these two stops Harvey (2,600m) and team mate, Kregor Zirk (2,250m), had raced more than all other swimmers.

In June 2021, Harvey qualified to represent Canada at the 2020 Summer Olympics, which had been delayed a year because of the COVID-19 pandemic. Harvey competed in the heats of the 4×200 m freestyle relay, helping the team qualify to the final, where she was replaced by Kayla Sanchez. The Canadian team finished fourth.

=== 2022–2024 ===
Competing at the 2022 World Aquatics Championships, Harvey qualified for her first ever individual World final, finishing eighth in the 200 m individual medley. Of the result she said "I can't really be mad because it was my first final at the Worlds. It was a step in the right direction but not the time and placing I was aiming for." Harvey competed in the heats of the 4×200 m freestyle relay for the Canadian team, helping to the event final, where she was replaced by Summer McIntosh. She shared in the team's bronze medal win. Harvey later reported that she had been drugged on the final night of the World Championships, and woke up with a rib sprain and a "small" concussion, as well as with numerous bruises. She said she had no memory of a period of approximately four to six hours that night.

Later in the summer, Harvey joined her second Commonwealth Games team, for the 2022 edition in Birmingham. She swam in the heats of the mixed 4×100 m freestyle relay for the Canadian team, being replaced in the event final by Maggie Mac Neil, and shared in the team's bronze medal win. On the second day of competition, Harvey finished sixth in both the heats and semi-finals of the 100 m backstroke. Harvey won a silver medal with the 4×200 m freestyle relay team on the third day of competition. She went on to place sixth in the 100 m backstroke final.

With Penny Oleksiak absent from the 2023 World Aquatics Championships, Harvey was part of the Canadian 4×100 metre freestyle relay team; the team finished seventh. That same day she finished eleventh in the semi-finals of the 200 m individual medley, missing the final, which she admitted was a disappointment. In her other individual event, Harvey was nineteenth in the heats of the 200 m freestyle. She went on to appear in the finals of two other relay events, as part of Canadian teams that came fifth in the 4×200 m freestyle relay and fourth in the mixed 4×100 m freestyle relay. She swam the freestyle segment of the 4×100 m medley relay, being replaced by McIntosh in the final, sharing in the eventual bronze medal win, her second World Aquatics medal. Later in the year, Harvey attended her second Pan American Games, competing at the 2023 edition in Santiago. She won seven medals at the event, including three gold medals, her first of that colour at the senior level. Two gold medals came in relays, with an individual gold in the 200 m freestyle, which she called "a long time coming."

Harvey qualified for her second Canadian Olympic team, for the 2024 Summer Olympics in Paris. In her lone individual event, she qualified to the final of the 200 m freestyle, finishing narrowly eighth among the semi-finalists for the last berth, 0.09 seconds of ninth-place American Erin Gemmell. She went on to finish an unexpected fourth in the final, 0.79 seconds behind bronze medalist Siobhán Haughey of Hong Kong. Harvey was also part of the Canadian women's relay teams, swimming in the final of the 4×200 m freestyle relay and the heats of both the 4×100 m freestyle and 4×100 m medley events. The Canadian teams came fourth in all three, giving Harvey four fourth-place finishes in Paris. She commented that she was "leaving Paris with no medals around my neck but with a smile on my face and a luggage full of memories that I'll cherish for the rest of my life." At the end of the year, Harvey competed at the 2024 World Swimming Championships in Budapest. There she won a bronze medal in the 400 m freestyle, and then a silver in the 200 m freestyle, her first individual medals from a major World Aquatics championship. She also claimed another silver and two bronze medals in relay events. At the conclusion of the championship, World Aquatics named her its Female Breakout Athlete of the Year.

=== 2025–present ===
At the 2025 World Aquatics Championships in Singapore, Harvey won the bronze medal in the 200 m individual medley. She finished 0.06 seconds ahead of 12-year-old Chinese prodigy Yu Zidi, who came fourth. This was Harvey's first individual medal at the World Aquatics Championships. Canadian teammate Summer McIntosh won gold in the same event, and invited Harvey atop the podium for the performance of "O Canada" at the award ceremony, remarking afterwards that "the highlight for me tonight was Mary getting on the podium. That's absolutely incredible, and she's worked so hard for this."
