= 2024 World Aquatics Swimming Championships (25 m) – Women's 200 metre butterfly =

Swimming competition

Women's 200 metre butterfly at the 2024 World Aquatics Swimming Championships (25 m)
- Venue: Duna Arena
- Location: Budapest, Hungary
- Dates: 12 December
- Competitors: 32 from 28 nations
- Winning time: 1:59.32 WR

Medalists
gold medal	Summer McIntosh	Canada
silver medal	Regan Smith	United States
bronze medal	Elizabeth Dekkers	Australia

The women's 200 metre butterfly event at the 2024 World Aquatics Swimming Championships (25 m) was held on 12 December 2024 at the Duna Arena in Budapest, Hungary.

== Records ==
Prior to the competition, the existing world and championship records were as follows:

World record	Mireia Belmonte Garcia (ESP)	1:59.61	Doha, Qatar	3 December 2014
Competition record	Mireia Belmonte Garcia (ESP)	1:59.61	Doha, Qatar	3 December 2014

The following record was established during the competition:

Date	Event	Name	Nationality	Time	Record
12 December	Final	Summer McIntosh	Canada	1:59.32	WR

== Results ==
=== Heats ===
The heats were started at 9:31.

Rank	Heat	Lane	Name	Nationality	Time	Notes
1	2	4	Summer McIntosh	Canada	2:01.96	Q, WJ, NR
2	2	3	Alex Shackell	United States	2:02.79	Q
3	3	5	Laura Lahtinen	Finland	2:03.55	Q
4	4	4	Regan Smith	United States	2:04.11	Q
5	2	5	Elizabeth Dekkers	Australia	2:04.34	Q
6	4	3	Helena Rosendahl Bach	Denmark	2:04.71	Q
7	3	4	Chen Luying	China	2:05.23	Q
8	4	5	Bella Grant	Australia	2:05.53	Q
9	2	7	Georgia Damasioti	Greece	2:05.90	R, NR
10	3	7	Laura Cabanes	Spain	2:06.91	R
11	4	2	Laura Ilyés	Hungary	2:06.93	
12	3	3	Gong Zhenqi	China	2:07.85	
13	3	1	Yeung Hoi Ching	Hong Kong	2:08.77	
14	2	6	Boglárka Kapás	Hungary	2:08.91	
15	3	2	Nicholle Toh	Singapore	2:08.99	
16	4	1	María José Mata	Neutral Athletes C	2:09.32	
17	4	7	Zehra Bilgin	Turkey	2:09.63	
18	2	2	Katja Fain	Slovenia	2:10.71	
19	4	6	Lee Hee-eun	South Korea	2:11.13	
20	2	8	Iman Avdić	Bosnia and Herzegovina	2:11.91	
21	3	0	Jinjutha Pholjamjumrus	Thailand	2:12.70	
22	4	0	Zora Ripková	Slovakia	2:12.92	
23	4	8	Neve Tassicker	New Zealand	2:12.99	
24	3	8	Yasmin Silva	Peru	2:14.32	
25	3	9	Karina Solera	Costa Rica	2:14.39	NR
26	2	0	Ana Nizharadze	Georgia	2:15.15	
27	2	1	Applejean Gwinn	Chinese Taipei	2:15.31	
28	1	4	Anje van As	Zimbabwe	2:19.82	
29	4	9	Lia Lima	Angola	2:20.18	
30	1	3	Hashika Ramachandra	India	2:25.88	
31	1	5	Amaya Bollinger	Guam	2:29.39	
	3	6	Umi Ishizuka	Japan	Disqualified	

=== Final ===
The final was held at 18:06.

Rank	Lane	Name	Nationality	Time	Notes
1st place, gold medalist(s)	4	Summer McIntosh	Canada	1:59.32	WR
2nd place, silver medalist(s)	6	Regan Smith	United States	2:01.00	NR
3rd place, bronze medalist(s)	2	Elizabeth Dekkers	Australia	2:02.91	
4	5	Alex Shackell	United States	2:03.23	
5	1	Chen Luying	China	2:03.67	
6	8	Bella Grant	Australia	2:03.91	
7	7	Helena Rosendahl Bach	Denmark	2:04.08	
8	3	Laura Lahtinen	Finland	2:05.71	
