= 2024 World Aquatics Swimming Championships (25 m) – Women's 400 metre freestyle =

Swimming competition

Women's 400 metre freestyle at the 2024 World Aquatics Swimming Championships (25 m)
- Venue: Duna Arena
- Location: Budapest, Hungary
- Dates: 10 December (heats and final)
- Competitors: 41 from 35 nations
- Winning time: 3:50.25 WR

Medalists
gold medal	Summer McIntosh	Canada
silver medal	Lani Pallister	Australia
bronze medal	Mary-Sophie Harvey	Canada

The women's 400 metre freestyle event at the 2024 World Aquatics Swimming Championships (25 m) was held on 10 December 2024 at the Duna Arena in Budapest, Hungary.

== Records ==
Prior to the competition, the existing world and championship records were as follows.

World record	Li Bingjie (CHN)	3:51.30	Beijing, China	27 October 2022
Competition record	Ariarne Titmus (AUS)	3:53.92	Hangzhou, China	14 December 2018

The following record was established during the competition:

Date	Event	Name	Nationality	Time	Record
10 December	Final	Summer McIntosh	Canada	3:50.25	WR

== Results ==
=== Heats ===
The heats were started at 09:02.

Rank	Heat	Lane	Name	Nationality	Time	Notes
1	5	5	Summer McIntosh	Canada	3:57.55	Q
2	5	4	Lani Pallister	Australia	3:57.97	Q
3	5	6	Claire Weinstein	United States	3:58.58	Q
4	5	2	Paige Madden	United States	3:58.83	Q
5	5	7	Isabel Gose	Germany	3:59.87	Q
6	4	4	Mary-Sophie Harvey	Canada	4:00.04	Q
7	4	6	Leah Neale	Australia	4:01.99	Q
8	4	2	Sofia Diakova	Neutral Athletes B	4:02.03	Q
9	4	5	Maria Fernanda Costa	Brazil	4:02.52	
10	4	3	Miyu Namba	Japan	4:02.75	
11	4	1	Ajna Késely	Hungary	4:03.14	
12	4	7	Helena Rosendahl Bach	Denmark	4:03.63	
13	5	3	Simona Quadarella	Italy	4:04.08	
14	3	1	Gan Ching Hwee	Singapore	4:04.17	NR
15	5	1	Kong Yaqi	China	4:05.19	
16	4	9	Eve Thomas	New Zealand	4:06.27	
17	3	3	Boglárka Kapás	Hungary	4:06.58	
18	3	4	Letícia Romão	Brazil	4:08.15	
19	4	0	Liang Xiaolan	China	4:08.46	
20	5	9	Amelie Blocksidge	Great Britain	4:08.96	
21	5	8	Francisca Martins	Portugal	4:09.39	
22	5	0	Deniz Ertan	Turkey	4:10.25	
23	3	7	Iman Avdić	Bosnia and Herzegovina	4:10.83	=NR
24	3	2	Tiffany Murillo	Colombia	4:11.00	
25	4	8	Wiktoria Guść	Poland	4:11.06	
26	3	6	Delfina Dini	Argentina	4:11.43	
27	3	9	María Yegres	Venezuela	4:12.34	
28	3	8	Hannah Robertson	South Africa	4:12.77	
29	2	6	Kyra Rabess	Cayman Islands	4:14.77	NR
30	2	4	Laura Benková	Slovakia	4:15.03	
31	3	0	Vala Dís Cicero	Iceland	4:16.11	
32	2	5	Gilaine Ma	Hong Kong	4:16.71	
33	3	5	Han Da-kyung	South Korea	4:20.03	
34	2	2	Sara Jankovikj	North Macedonia	4:22.11	
35	2	7	Karin Belbeisi	Jordan	4:24.70	
36	2	8	Jehanara Nabi	Pakistan	4:26.85	
37	2	1	Michell Ramírez	Honduras	4:29.31	
38	2	3	Keisy Castro	Costa Rica	4:29.83	
39	1	4	Hashika Ramachandra	India	4:30.30	
40	1	5	Riga Shala	Kosovo	4:44.01	
41	1	3	Adaya Sian Bourne	Sint Maarten	5:08.74	

=== Final ===
The final was held at 17:32.

Rank	Lane	Name	Nationality	Time	Notes
1st place, gold medalist(s)	4	Summer McIntosh	Canada	3:50.25	WR
2nd place, silver medalist(s)	5	Lani Pallister	Australia	3:53.73	OC
3rd place, bronze medalist(s)	7	Mary-Sophie Harvey	Canada	3:54.88	
4	6	Paige Madden	United States	3:55.12	
5	3	Claire Weinstein	United States	3:56.12	
6	2	Isabel Gose	Germany	3:56.84	NR
7	1	Leah Neale	Australia	4:01.45	
8	8	Sofia Diakova	Neutral Athletes B	4:02.27	
