= Abbie Wood =

British swimmer (born 1999)

Personal information
- Full name: Abbie Louise Wood
- Nationality: British
- Born: 2 March 1999 (age 27) Buxton, England
- Height: 1.66 m (5 ft 5 in)
- Weight: 60 kg (132 lb)

Sport
- Sport: Swimming
- Strokes: Individual medley
Medal record
Representing Great Britain
World Championships (LC)
Silver medal – second place	2024 Doha	4×200 m freestyle
World Championships (SC)
Silver medal – second place	2024 Budapest	4×100 m medley
Bronze medal – third place	2024 Budapest	200 m medley
Bronze medal – third place	2024 Budapest	400 m medley
European Championships (LC)
Gold medal – first place	2020 Budapest	4×100 m freestyle
Gold medal – first place	2020 Budapest	4×200 m mixed freestyle
Gold medal – first place	2026 Paris	4×200 m freestyle
Silver medal – second place	2020 Budapest	200 m medley
European Games
Gold medal – first place	2015 Baku	400 m medley
Silver medal – second place	2015 Baku	4×100 m mixed medley
Bronze medal – third place	2015 Baku	200 m medley
Bronze medal – third place	2015 Baku	4×100 m medley
Representing England
Commonwealth Games
Silver medal – second place	2022 Birmingham	4×100 m freestyle
Silver medal – second place	2022 Birmingham	4×100 m mixed freestyle
Bronze medal – third place	2022 Birmingham	200 m medley
Bronze medal – third place	2022 Birmingham	4×200 m freestyle
Bronze medal – third place	2022 Birmingham	4×100 m mixed medley

Abbie Louise Wood (born 2 March 1999) is an English and British swimmer who competed at the 2024 Summer Olympics.

== Biography ==
Wood was born in 1999 and she is from Buxton in Derbyshire. She is a student of Loughborough University. She competed in the women's 4 × 100 metre freestyle relay event at the 2020 European Aquatics Championships, in Budapest, Hungary, winning the gold medal.

Wood was named as a member of the British team to go to the postponed 2020 Olympics in April 2021. This was her first Olympics where she joined an "exceptionally high quality" swimming team including Jacob Whittle, Sarah Vasey and Molly Renshaw who are all from Derbyshire and were also at their first Olympics.

As part of the 2021 International Swimming League, Wood was selected to the roster of team New York Breakers.

In 2023, she became the European champion (short-course) in the 200 metre and 400 metre individual medley.

After winning the 200 metres medley at the 2024 Aquatics GB Swimming Championships, Wood sealed her place at the 2024 Summer Olympics. At the Olympics, Wood finished fifth in the women's 200 metre individual medley final and fifth in the 200 metres freestyle relay final.

In 2025, Wood won the 400 metres medley title and finished third behind Freya Colbert in the 200 metres freestyle at the 2025 Aquatics GB Swimming Championships, which sealed a qualification place for the 2025 World Aquatics Championships in Singapore. Later at the Championships, she also won the 200 metres medley for the second consecutive year. Subsequently at the World Championships, she reached the final of the 200 metres medley.

== Awards and honours ==
- SwimSwam Top 100 (Women's): 2021 (#85)

== See also ==
- List of European Aquatics Championships medalists in swimming (women)
- List of European Short Course Swimming Championships medalists (women)
