= Swimming at the 2022 Asian Games =

- Venue: Hangzhou Olympic Expo Aquatics Center; Qiandao Lake
- Dates: 24 September – 7 October 2023
- Competitors: 391 from 37 nations

Swimming at the 2022 Asian Games was held at the Hangzhou Olympic Sports Park Aquatics Center in Hangzhou Olympic Sports Expo Center, Hangzhou, China, from 24 to 29 September 2023.

The 2022 Asian Games saw the introduction of the new discipline of marathon swimming. The newly introduced open water marathon events (10 km) were held on 6 and 7 October 2023 at the Chun'an Jieshou Sports Centre Swimming Course, Chun'an County, Zhejiang.

== Schedule ==
H	Heats	F	Final

Event↓/Date →	24th Sun		25th Mon		26th Tue		27th Wed		28th Thu		29th Fri	
Men's 50 m freestyle			H	F								
Men's 100 m freestyle	H	F										
Men's 200 m freestyle							H	F				
Men's 400 m freestyle											H	F
Men's 800 m freestyle									F			
Men's 1500 m freestyle					F							
Men's 50 m backstroke			H	F								
Men's 100 m backstroke	H	F										
Men's 200 m backstroke											H	F
Men's 50 m breaststroke											H	F
Men's 100 m breaststroke			H	F								
Men's 200 m breaststroke									H	F		
Men's 50 m butterfly									H	F		
Men's 100 m butterfly							H	F				
Men's 200 m butterfly											H	F
Men's 200 m individual medley	H	F										
Men's 400 m individual medley					H	F						
Men's 4 × 100 m freestyle relay									H	F		
Men's 4 × 200 m freestyle relay			H	F								
Men's 4 × 100 m medley relay					H	F						
Women's 50 m freestyle									H	F		
Women's 100 m freestyle					H	F						
Women's 200 m freestyle			H	F								
Women's 400 m freestyle					H	F						
Women's 800 m freestyle											F	
Women's 1500 m freestyle	F											
Women's 50 m backstroke			H	F								
Women's 100 m backstroke							H	F				
Women's 200 m backstroke					H	F						
Women's 50 m breaststroke	H	F										
Women's 100 m breaststroke							H	F				
Women's 200 m breaststroke									H	F		
Women's 50 m butterfly											H	F
Women's 100 m butterfly							H	F				
Women's 200 m butterfly	H	F										
Women's 200 m individual medley			H	F								
Women's 400 m individual medley							H	F				
Women's 4 × 100 m freestyle relay	H	F										
Women's 4 × 200 m freestyle relay									H	F		
Women's 4 × 100 m medley relay											H	F
Mixed 4 × 100 m medley relay							H	F				

Event↓/Date →	6th Fri	7th Sat
Men's 10 km marathon		F
Women's 10 km marathon	F	

== Medalists ==
=== Men ===
Event	Gold		Silver		Bronze	
50 m freestyle	Ji Yu-chan; South Korea	21.72; GR, NR	Ian Ho; Hong Kong	21.87	Pan Zhanle; China	21.92
100 m freestyle	Pan Zhanle; China	46.97; AR	Wang Haoyu; China	48.02	Hwang Sun-woo; South Korea	48.04
200 m freestyle	Hwang Sun-woo; South Korea	1:44.40; GR, NR	Pan Zhanle; China	1:45.28	Lee Ho-joon; South Korea	1:45.56
400 m freestyle	Kim Woo-min; South Korea	3:44.36	Pan Zhanle; China	3:48.81	Nguyễn Huy Hoàng; Vietnam	3:49.16
800 m freestyle	Kim Woo-min; South Korea	7:46.03; GR, NR	Fei Liwei; China	7:49.90	Nguyễn Huy Hoàng; Vietnam	7:51.44
1500 m freestyle	Fei Liwei; China	14.55.47	Kim Woo-min; South Korea	15.01.07	Shogo Takeda; Japan	15.03.29
50 m backstroke	Xu Jiayu; China	24.38; NR	Wang Gukailai; China	24.88	Ryosuke Irie; Japan	25.15
100 m backstroke	Xu Jiayu; China	52.23; GR	Ryosuke Irie; Japan	53.46	Lee Ju-ho; South Korea	53.54
200 m backstroke	Xu Jiayu; China	1:55.37	Lee Ju-ho; South Korea	1:56.54; NR	Hidekazu Takehara; Japan	1:57.63
50 m breaststroke	Qin Haiyang; China	26.35	Sun Jiajun; China	26.92	Choi Dong-yeol; South Korea	26.93
100 m breaststroke	Qin Haiyang; China	57.76; GR	Yan Zibei; China	59.09	Choi Dong-yeol; South Korea	59.28; NR
200 m breaststroke	Qin Haiyang; China	2:07.03; GR	Dong Zhihao; China	2:08.67	Ippei Watanabe; Japan	2:09.91
50 m butterfly	Baek In-chul; South Korea	23.29; GR	Teong Tzen Wei; Singapore	23.34	Adilbek Mussin; Kazakhstan	23.44
100 m butterfly	Katsuhiro Matsumoto; Japan	51.13	Wang Changhao; China	51.24	Adilbek Mussin; Kazakhstan	51.86
200 m butterfly	Tomoru Honda; Japan	1:53.15; GR	Wang Kuan-hung; Chinese Taipei	1:54.53	Chen Juner; China	1:56.04
200 m individual medley	Wang Shun; China	1:54.62; AR	Qin Haiyang; China	1:57.41	Daiya Seto; Japan	1:58.35
400 m individual medley	Tomoru Honda; Japan	4:11.40	Daiya Seto; Japan	4:12.88	Wang Shun; China	4:15.12
4 × 100 m freestyle relay	China; Pan Zhanle (47.06); Chen Juner (48.00); Hong Jinquan (48.27); Wang Haoyu (47.55); Wang Shun^{[a]} Wang Changhao^{[a]} Yang Jintong^{[a]}	3:10.88; AR	South Korea; Ji Yu-chan (48.90); Lee Ho-joon (47.79); Kim Ji-hun (48.66); Hwang Sun-woo (47.61); Yang Jae-hoon^{[a]} Lee Yoo-yeon^{[a]} Kim Young-beom^{[a]}	3:12.96; NR	Japan; Katsumi Nakamura (48.75); Katsuhiro Matsumoto (47.97); Taikan Tanaka (48.82); Tomonobu Gomi (48.72); Shinri Shioura^{[a]}	3:14.26
4 × 200 m freestyle relay	South Korea; Yang Jae-hoon (1:46.83); Lee Ho-joon (1:45.36); Kim Woo-min (1:44.50); Hwang Sun-woo (1:45.04); Lee Yoo-yeon^{[a]} Kim Gun-woo^{[a]}	7:01.73; AR	China; Wang Shun (1:45.96); Niu Guangsheng (1:46.68); Wang Haoyu (1:45.99); Pan Zhanle (1:44.77); Fei Liwei^{[a]} Hong Jinquan^{[a]} Zhang Ziyang^{[a]}	7:03.40; NR	Japan; Hidenari Mano (1:47.11); Tomoru Honda (1:45.59); Taikan Tanaka (1:48.00); Katsuhiro Matsumoto (1:45.59); So Ogata^{[a]}	7:06.29
4 × 100 m medley relay	China; Xu Jiayu (52.05) GR; Qin Haiyang (57.63); Wang Changhao (50.68); Pan Zhanle (46.65); Wang Shun^{[a]} Yan Zibei^{[a]} Sun Jiajun^{[a]} Wang Haoyu^{[a]}	3:27.01; AR	South Korea; Lee Ju-ho (53.54); Choi Dong-yeol (59.12); Kim Young-beom (51.76); Hwang Sun-woo (47.63); Cho Sung-jae^{[a]} Kim Ji-hun^{[a]} Lee Ho-joon^{[a]}	3:32.05; NR	Japan; Ryosuke Irie (53.71); Yuya Hinomoto (59.72); Katsuhiro Matsumoto (50.93); Katsumi Nakamura (48.16); Daiki Yanagawa^{[a]} Naoki Mizunuma^{[a]}	3:32.52
10 km marathon	Zhang Ziyang; China	1:55:45.8	Lan Tianchen; China	1:55:46.2	Park Jae-hun; South Korea	1:56:00.3

^{a} Swimmers who participated in the heats only and received medals.

=== Women ===
Event	Gold		Silver		Bronze	
50 m freestyle	Zhang Yufei; China	24.26; GR	Siobhán Haughey; Hong Kong	24.34	Cheng Yujie; China	24.60
100 m freestyle	Siobhán Haughey; Hong Kong	52.17; AR	Yang Junxuan; China	53.11	Cheng Yujie; China	53.91
200 m freestyle	Siobhán Haughey; Hong Kong	1:54.12; GR	Li Bingjie; China	1:56.00	Liu Yaxin; China	1:56.43
400 m freestyle	Li Bingjie; China	4:01.96; GR	Ma Yonghui; China	4:05.68	Waka Kobori; Japan	4:07.81
800 m freestyle	Li Bingjie; China	8:20.01	Waka Kobori; Japan	8:28.78	Yang Peiqi; China	8:35.47
1500 m freestyle	Li Bingjie; China	15:51.18; GR	Gao Weizhong; China	16:05.73	Yukimi Moriyama; Japan	16:17.78
50 m backstroke	Wang Xueer; China	27.35	Wan Letian; China	27.41	Miki Takahashi; Japan	28.21
100 m backstroke	Wan Letian; China	59.38	Wang Xueer; China	59.52	Lee Eun-ji; South Korea	1:00.03 =NR
200 m backstroke	Peng Xuwei; China	2:07.28	Liu Yaxin; China	2:08.70	Lee Eun-ji; South Korea	2:09.75
50 m breaststroke	Tang Qianting; China	29.96	Satomi Suzuki; Japan	30.14; NR	Siobhán Haughey; Hong Kong	30.36; NR
100 m breaststroke	Reona Aoki; Japan	1:06.81	Satomi Suzuki; Japan	1:06.95	Yang Chang; China	1:07.01
200 m breaststroke	Ye Shiwen; China	2:23.84	Kwon Se-hyun; South Korea	2:26.31	Runa Imai; Japan	2:26.41
50 m butterfly	Zhang Yufei; China	25.10; GR	Yu Yiting; China	25.71	Rikako Ikee; Japan	26.02
100 m butterfly	Zhang Yufei; China	55.86; GR	Ai Soma; Japan	57.57	Wang Yichun; China	57.83
200 m butterfly	Zhang Yufei; China	2:05.57; GR	Yu Liyan; China	2:08.31	Hiroko Makino; Japan	2:09.22
200 m individual medley	Yu Yiting; China	2:07.75; GR	Ye Shiwen; China	2:10.34	Kim Seo-yeong; South Korea	2:10.36
400 m individual medley	Yu Yiting; China	4:35.44	Ageha Tanigawa; Japan	4:35.65	Mio Narita; Japan	4:38.77
4 × 100 m freestyle relay	China; Yang Junxuan (53.86); Cheng Yujie (53.07); Wu Qingfeng (53.84); Zhang Yufei (53.19); Li Bingjie^{[b]} Yu Yiting^{[b]} Liu Yaxin^{[b]}	3:33.96; GR	Japan; Nagisa Ikemoto (54.59); Chihiro Igarashi (54.93); Rikako Ikee (54.66); Rio Shirai (54.30)	3:38.48	Hong Kong; Camille Cheng (56.11); Siobhán Haughey (51.92); Tam Hoi Lam (55.66); Stephanie Au (55.41); Natalie Kan^{[b]}	3:39.10; NR
4 × 200 m freestyle relay	China; Liu Yaxin (1:56.45); Cheng Yujie (1:58.56); Li Bingjie (1:56.14); Li Jiaping (1:58.19); Wu Qingfeng^{[b]} Ge Chutong^{[b]} Yang Peiqi^{[b]}	7:49.34	Japan; Rio Shirai (1:59.28); Nagisa Ikemoto (1:57.73); Waka Kobori (1:59.00); Miyu Namba (1:59.92); Mio Narita^{[b]} Hiroko Makino^{[b]}	7:55.93	South Korea; Kim Seo-yeong (1:59.43); Hur Yeon-kyung (1:58.64); Park Su-jin (2:01.32); Han Da-kyung (2:00.72); Lee Eun-ji^{[b]} Jeong So-eun^{[b]}	8:00.11
4 × 100 m medley relay	Japan; Miki Takahashi (1:00.80); Reona Aoki (1:06.21); Ai Soma (57.28); Nagisa Ikemoto (53.38); Hiroko Makino^{[b]}	3:57.67	South Korea; Lee Eun-ji (1:00.68); Ko Ha-ru (1:08.42); Kim Seo-yeong (57.41); Hur Yeon-kyung (53.62); Kim Hye-jin^{[b]} Park Su-jin^{[b]} Jeong So-eun^{[b]}	4:00.13	Hong Kong; Stephanie Au (1:00.74); Siobhán Haughey (1:06.03); Natalie Kan (59.89); Tam Hoi Lam (55.06); Cindy Cheung^{[b]} Lam Hoi Kiu^{[b]} Yeung Hoi Ching^{[b]} Camille Cheng^{[b]}	4:01.72
10 km marathon	Wu Shutong; China	2:03:36.4	Airi Ebina; Japan	2:03:44.9	Sun Jiake; China	2:03:57.9

^{b} Swimmers who participated in the heats only and received medals.

=== Mixed ===
Event	Gold		Silver		Bronze	
4 × 100 m medley relay	China; Xu Jiayu (51.91); Qin Haiyang (57.25); Zhang Yufei (56.05); Yang Junxuan (52.52); Wang Shun^{[c]} Yan Zibei^{[c]} Wang Yichun^{[c]} Cheng Yujie^{[c]}	3:37.73; AR	Japan; Ryosuke Irie (53.64); Yuya Hinomoto (59.50); Ai Soma (57.78); Nagisa Ikemoto (53.72); Hidekazu Takehara^{[c]} Ippei Watanabe^{[c]} Hiroko Makino^{[c]}	3:44.64	South Korea; Lee Eun-ji (1:01.37); Choi Dong-yeol (59.69); Kim Seo-yeong (57.39); Hwang Sun-woo (48.33); Lee Ju-ho^{[c]} Hur Yeon-kyung^{[c]}	3:46.78; NR

^{c} Swimmers who participated in the heats only and received medals.

== Medal table ==
Rank	Nation	Gold	Silver	Bronze	Total
1	China (CHN)	30	22	10	62
2	South Korea (KOR)	6	6	11	23
3	Japan (JPN)	5	11	15	31
4	Hong Kong (HKG)	2	2	3	7
5	Chinese Taipei (TPE)	0	1	0	1
5	Singapore (SGP)	0	1	0	1
7	Kazakhstan (KAZ)	0	0	2	2
7	Vietnam (VIE)	0	0	2	2
Totals (8 entries)		43	43	43	129

== Participating nations ==
A total of 391 athletes from 37 nations competed in swimming at the 2002 Asian Games:

- Afghanistan (1)
- Bangladesh (2)
- Bhutan (2)
- Cambodia (4)
- China (43)
- Chinese Taipei (10)
- Hong Kong (39)
- India (21)
- Indonesia (8)
- Iran (4)
- Japan (41)
- Kazakhstan (9)
- Kuwait (2)
- Kyrgyzstan (2)
- Laos (5)
- Lebanon (1)
- Macau (10)
- Malaysia (7)
- Maldives (8)
- Mongolia (29)
- Nepal (4)
- North Korea (2)
- Oman (2)
- Pakistan (7)
- Palestine (4)
- Philippines (8)
- Qatar (6)
- Singapore (25)
- South Korea (28)
- Sri Lanka (3)
- Tajikistan (8)
- Thailand (24)
- Timor-Leste (2)
- Turkmenistan (3)
- United Arab Emirates (4)
- Uzbekistan (3)
- Vietnam (10)
