= Japan at the 2022 Asian Games =

- IOC code: JPN
- NOC: Japanese Olympic Committee

in Hangzhou 23 September 2023 – 8 October 2023
- Competitors: 772 in 50 sports
- Flag bearers (opening): Akihito Shimizu; Misaki Emura
- Flag bearer (closing): Shigeyuki Nakarai
- Medals Ranked 2nd: Gold 52 Silver 67 Bronze 69 Total 188

Asian Games appearances (overview)
- 1951; 1954; 1958; 1962; 1966; 1970; 1974; 1978; 1982; 1986; 1990; 1994; 1998; 2002; 2006; 2010; 2014; 2018; 2022; 2026

Japan competed at the 2022 Asian Games in Hangzhou, China. The event was scheduled to be held in September 2022 but due to COVID-19 pandemic cases rising in China the event was postponed and rescheduled to September–October 2023. Japan competed with 772 athletes.

With Nagoya and Aichi Prefecture hosting the 2026 Asian Games, a Japanese segment was performed at the closing ceremony.

== Background ==
=== Inauguration ceremony ===
On September 15, 2023, the Japanese Olympic Committee (JOC) held a team inauguration ceremony in Tokyo in the presence of Prince and Princess Akishino. About 720 people from a total of 1,137 delegates, including 771 players and 366 managers and coaches, excluding players participating in overseas training camps, attended the ceremony.

=== Broadcasters ===
Name	Type	Ref.
TBS	Terrestrial	
U-Next	Streaming platform	

== Medalists ==
The following Japan competitors won medals at the Games.

Medal	Name	Sport	Event	Date
Gold	Natsumi Tsunoda	Judo	Women's 48 kg	24 September
Gold	Ryoma Tanaka	Judo	Men's 66 kg	24 September
Gold	Hinano Kusaki	Skateboarding	Women's park	25 September
Gold	Miku Takaichi	Judo	Women's 63 kg	25 September
Gold	Shiho Tanaka	Judo	Women's 70 kg	25 September
Gold	Yoshitaku Nagasako; Yuta Obara; Kaiya Ota; Shinji Nakano	Cycling	Men's team sprint	26 September
Gold	Tomoru Honda	Swimming	Men's 400 m individual medley	26 September
Gold	Koki Kano	Fencing	Men's individual épée	26 September
Gold	Keiju Okada; Miho Yoshioka	Sailing	470	27 September
Gold	Yumi Kajihara; Mizuki Ikeda; Tsuyaka Uchino; Maho Kakita	Cycling	Women's team pursuit	27 September
Gold	Shoi Matsuda; Kazushige Kuboki; Eiya Hashimoto; Naoki Kojima; Shunsuke Imamura	Cycling	Men's team pursuit	27 September
Gold	Mina Sato	Cycling	Women's keirin	27 September
Gold	Ken Oyoshi; Ryoma Tanaka; Yuhei Oino; Goki Tajima; Hyoga Ota; Aaron Wolf; Momo Tamaoki; Natsumi Tsunoda; Moka Kuwagata; Shiho Tanaka; Ruri Takahashi; Wakaba Tomita	Judo	Mixed team	27 September
Gold	Katsuhiro Matsumoto	Swimming	Men's 100 m butterfly	27 September
Gold	Reona Aoki	Swimming	Women's 100 m breaststroke	27 September
Gold	Tsuyaka Uchino; Maho Kakita	Cycling	Women's madison	28 September
Gold	Kaiya Ota	Cycling	Men's sprint	28 September
Gold	Kazushige Kuboki	Cycling	Men's omnium	28 September
Gold	Kenji Nener	Triathlon	Men's individual	29 September
Gold	Wataru Tanigawa	Gymnastics	Men's vault	29 September
Gold	Mana Okamura	Gymnastics	Women's balance beam	29 September
Gold	Masaru Yamada; Koki Kano; Ryu Matsumoto; Akira Komata	Fencing	Men's team épée	29 September
Gold	Naoki Kojima; Shunsuke Imamura	Cycling	Men's madison	29 September
Gold	Yumi Kajihara	Cycling	Women's omnium	29 September
Gold	Mina Sato	Cycling	Women's sprint	29 September
Gold	Tomoru Honda	Swimming	Men's 200 m butterfly	29 September
Gold	Miki Takahashi; Reona Aoki; Ai Soma; Nagisa Ikemoto	Swimming	Women's 4×100 m medley relay	29 September
Gold	Yuko Takahashi	Triathlon	Women's individual	30 September
Gold	Asuma Nakai	Cycling	Men's BMX race	1 October
Gold	Kenji Nener; Takumi Hojo; Yuko Takahashi; Yuka Sato	Triathlon	Mixed relay	2 October
Gold	Sakura Miwa; Kanna Kudo; Yui Nakamizo; Kyoko Ishikawa; Yui Sakamoto; Nodoka Harada; Ayane Nakagawa; Hitomi Kawabata; Minori Naito; Yukiko Ueno; Misaki Katsumoto; Risa Kawamura; Yume Kiriishi; Haruka Agatsuma; Hotaru Tsukamoto; Miu Goto; Haruka Sumitani	Softball	Women's tournament	2 October
Gold	Koki Ueyama	Athletics	Men's 200 m	2 October
Gold	Shunya Takayama	Athletics	Men's 110 m hurdles	2 October
Gold	Tomomi Shimuta; Haruka Kubo; Kurumi Onoue; Emina Watanabe; Noa Takahashi	Soft tennis	Women's team	4 October
Gold	Sora Hirooka; Toshiki Uematsu; Hayato Funemizu; Riku Uchida; Takafumi Uchimoto	Soft tennis	Men's team	4 October
Gold	Katsuaki Endo	Wrestling	Men's Greco-Roman 67 kg	4 October
Gold	Sewon Okazawa	Boxing	Men's 71 kg	4 October
Gold	Kazumasa Moto	Karate	Men's kata	5 October
Gold	Kiyou Shimizu	Karate	Women's kata	5 October
Gold	Naoko Sahara; Miyako Hatsumi; Yumi Kitahara; Saki Hattori; Chikako Kasai; Atsuko Baba; Kaho Nakayama; Ayaka Ohmatsuzawa; Hikaru Matsumoto; Naho Saito; Natsuki Aizawa; Ayame Okada; Reina Dan; Kana Ozaki; Yuki Yoshidome; Sora Ishikawa	Handball	Women's tournament	5 October
Gold	Remina Yoshimoto	Wrestling	Women's freestyle 50 kg	5 October
Gold	Akari Fujinami	Wrestling	Women's freestyle 53 kg	5 October
Gold	Tsugumi Sakurai	Wrestling	Women's freestyle 57 kg	5 October
Gold	Toshiki Uematsu; Noa Takahashi	Soft tennis	Mixed doubles	5 October
Gold	Toshihiro Hasegawa	Wrestling	Men's freestyle 57 kg	6 October
Gold	Sorato Anraku	Climbing	Men's combined	6 October
Gold	Natsumi Asano; Shinomi Koyama; Wakaba Goto; Toko Koga; Reina Wakisaka; Yuzuho Shiokoshi; Yoshino Nakashima; Momoko Tanikawa; Suzu Amano; Yuzuki Yamamoto; Remina Chiba; Shu Ohba; Mamiko Matsumoto; Haruna Tabata; Rio Sasaki; Chihiro Ishida; Kotono Sakakibara; Mami Ueno; Mei Shimada; Maya Hijikata; Haruka Osawa	Football	Women's tournament	6 October
Gold	Toshiki Uematsu	Soft tennis	Men's singles	7 October
Gold	Ai Mori	Climbing	Women's combined	7 October
Gold	Shigeyuki Nakarai	Breakdancing	B-Boys	7 October
Gold	Katsuyuki Tanamura; Seiya Adachi; Taiyo Watanabe; Daichi Ogihara; Ikkei Nitta; Toi Suzuki; Kiyomu Date; Mitsuru Takata; Atsushi Arai; Yusuke Inaba; Keigo Okawa; Kenta Araki; Towa Nishimura	Water polo	Men's tournament	7 October
Gold	Kazumasa Moto; Ryuji Moto; Koji Arimoto	Karate	Men's team kata	8 October
Silver	Sahoko Kinota; Akiho Takano; Haruna Sakakibara; Sayaka Chujo	Rowing	Women's four	24 September
Silver	Kanae Umemura; Misaki Uchida; Hana Shibata	Modern pentathlon	Women's team	24 September
Silver	Yuiko Niwa	Taekwondo	Women's individual poomsae	24 September
Silver	Satomi Suzuki	Swimming	Women's 50 m breaststroke	24 September
Silver	Ryosuke Irie	Swimming	Men's 100 m backstroke	24 September
Silver	Nagisa Ikemoto; Rio Shirai; Runa Imai; Rikako Ikee	Swimming	Women's 4×100 m freestyle relay	24 September
Silver	Takeru Kitazono; Ryota Tsumura; Wataru Tanigawa; Kakeru Tanigawa; Shohei Kawakami	Gymnastics	Men's artistic team	24 September
Silver	Ryuta Arakawa	Rowing	Men's single scull	25 September
Silver	Sayaka Chujo; Chiaki Tomita; Urara Kakishima; Emi Hirouchi; Akiho Takano; Sahoko Kinota; Shiho Yonekawa; Haruna Sakakibara; Saki Senda	Rowing	Women's eight	25 September
Silver	Yuro Nagahara	Skateboarding	Men's park	25 September
Silver	Momo Tamaoki	Judo	Women's 57 kg	25 September
Silver	Soichi Hashimoto	Judo	Men's 73 kg	25 September
Silver	Yuka Ueno	Fencing	Women's individual foil	25 September
Silver	Misaki Masui; Mana Okamura; Ayaka Sakaguchi; Mikako Serita; Kohane Ushioku	Gymnastics	Women's artistic team	25 September
Silver	Hina Hayata; Miwa Harimoto; Miu Hirano; Miyu Nagasaki; Miyuu Kihara	Table tennis	Women's team	26 September
Silver	Takeru Kitazono	Gymnastics	Men's artistic individual all-around	26 September
Silver	Rika Takayama	Judo	Women's 78 kg	26 September
Silver	Marin Kajiki; Chiaki Saegusa; Emii Tanaka; Mei Ohtani; Yume Hirano; Honoka Tsutsumi; Michiyo Suda; Chiharu Nakamura; Fumiko Otake; Rinka Matsuda; Yukino Tsujisaki; Wakaba Hara	Rugby	Women's tournament	26 September
Silver	Daiya Seto	Swimming	Men's 400 m individual medley	26 September
Silver	Akira Komata	Fencing	Men's individual épée	26 September
Silver	Misaki Tanaka; Sera Nagamatsu	Sailing	49erFX	27 September
Silver	Miki Ishii; Sayaka Mizoe	Beach volleyball	Women's tournament	27 September
Silver	Mana Okamura	Gymnastics	Women's artistic individual all-around	27 September
Silver	Ai Soma	Swimming	Women's 100 m butterfly	27 September
Silver	Satomi Suzuki	Swimming	Women's 100 m breaststroke	27 September
Silver	Ageha Tanigawa	Swimming	Women's 400 m individual medley	27 September
Silver	Ryosuke Irie; Yuya Hinomoto; Ai Soma; Nagisa Ikemoto	Swimming	Mixed 4×100 m medley relay	27 September
Silver	Ryota Tsumura	Gymnastics	Men's pommel horse	28 September
Silver	Mikako Serita	Gymnastics	Women's uneven bars	28 September
Silver	Rio Shirai; Nagisa Ikemoto; Waka Kobori; Miyu Namba; Mio Narita; Hiroko Makino	Swimming	Women's 4×200 m freestyle relay	28 September
Silver	Makoto Odakura	Triathlon	Men's individual	29 September
Silver	Takeru Kitazono	Gymnastics	Men's parallel bars	29 September
Silver	Misaki Emura; Shihomi Fukushima; Seri Ozaki; Kanae Kobayashi	Fencing	Women's team sabre	29 September
Silver	Waka Kobori	Swimming	Women's 800 m freestyle	29 September
Silver	Ririka Hironaka	Athletics	Women's 10.000 m	29 September
Silver	Yosuke Watanuki	Tennis	Men's singles	30 September
Silver	Kentaro Sato	Athletics	Men's 400 m	30 September
Silver	Matsuri Arai; Minami Itahashi	Diving	Women's synchronized 10 m platform	30 September
Silver	Ryoma Aoki	Athletics	Men's 3000 m steeplechase	1 October
Silver	Minami Shioya; Yumi Arima; Akari Inaba; Eruna Ura; Kako Kawaguchi; Hikaru Shitara; Ai Sunabe; Eri Kitamura; Kiyoka Goto; Fuka Nishiyama; Momo Inoue	Water polo	Women's tournament	1 October
Silver	Hina Hayata	Table tennis	Women's singles	1 October
Silver	Kazuhiro Yoshizawa; Shoto Kusumoto; Kenta Hiranaga; Yusuke Nakajima	Equestrian	Team eventing	2 October
Silver	Masato Hashimoto; Ryo Naganuma	Canoeing	Men's canoe double 500 m	2 October
Silver	Misaki Morota	Athletics	Women's pole vault	2 October
Silver	Eri Yonamine	Cycling	Women's individual time trial	3 October
Silver	Ririka Hironaka	Athletics	Women's 5000 metres	3 October
Silver	Yoshihide Kiryū; Yuki Koike; Koki Ueyama; Shoto Uno	Athletics	Men's 4×100 m relay	3 October
Silver	Masumi Fuchise; Maika Yagi; Subaru Ishida; Hayato Katsuki	Athletics	Mixed marathon walk relay	4 October
Silver	Mika Moritoki; Taiki Shibagaki	Roller skating	Mixed inline slalom pair	4 October
Silver	Satsuki Noda; Takaharu Furukawa	Archery	Mixed team recurve	4 October
Silver	Ayata Suzuki	Wrestling	Men's Greco-Roman 60 kg	4 October
Silver	Shudai Harada	Boxing	Men's 57 kg	5 October
Silver	Riku Uchida; Tomomi Shimuta	Soft tennis	Mixed doubles	5 October
Silver	Mai Kawai; Maki Takada; Minami Yabu; Azusa Asahina; Nako Motohashi; Saki Hayashi; Aika Hirashita; Saori Miyazaki; Anri Hoshi; Nanako Todo; Himawari Akaho; Monica Okoye	Basketball	Women's tournament	5 October
Silver	Airi Ebina	Marathon swimming	Women's 10 km	6 October
Silver	Nonoka Ozaki	Wrestling	Women's freestyle 62 kg	6 October
Silver	Yamato Kawahara; Seren Tanaka; Kentaro Fukuda; Taiki Takade; Takuma Niwa; Raiki Fujishima; Ken Nagayoshi; Ryosei Kato; Masaki Ohashi; Genki Mitani; Takumi Kitagawa; Shota Yamada; Yuma Nagai; Manabu Yamashita; Ryoma Ooka; Kaito Tanaka; Kosei Kawabe; Takashi Yoshikawa	Field hockey	Men's tournament	6 October
Silver	Miki Fujikura	Roller skating	Ladies' artistic	7 October
Silver	Noa Takahashi	Soft tennis	Women's singles	7 October
Silver	Yuta Watanabe; Arisa Higashino	Badminton	Mixed doubles	7 October
Silver	Yuuki Tanaka	Canoeing	Men's kayak slalom	7 October
Silver	Mashiro Yasunaga; Moe Higa	Artistic swimming	Women's duet	7 October
Silver	Kirin Kinoshita	Wrestling	Men's freestyle 74 kg	7 October
Silver	Ami Yuasa	Breakdancing	B-Girls	7 October
Silver	Koyomi Iwasaki; Haruyo Shimamura; Yuka Sato; Yuka Meguro; Minami Uesaka; Mizuki Tanaka; Miwako Osanai; Erina Ogawa; Miyu Nakagawa; Tsukasa Nakagawa; Yuki Nishikawa; Shion Hirayama	Volleyball	Women's tournament	7 October
Silver	Kazuki Fujita; Hayato Okuda; Manato Yoshida; Taichi Yamasaki; Seiya Baba; Daiki Matsuoka; Ibuki Konno; Masato Shigemi; Shun Ayukawa; Jun Nishikawa; Yuta Matsumura; Yuma Obata; Kein Sato; Yota Komi; Teppei Yachida; Kakeru Yamauchi; Shota Hino; Taiki Yamada; Kotaro Uchino; Koshiro Sumi; Kenta Nemoto; Hiroki Sekine	Football	Men's tournament	7 October
Silver	Ayano Shimada; Tomoka Sato; Moka Fujii; Mashiro Yasunaga; Akane Yanagisawa; Megumu Yoshida; Ami Wada; Moeka Kijima; Moe Higa	Artistic swimming	Women's team	8 October
Bronze	Taishu Sato; Kaoru Shinoki; Ryo Matsumoto	Modern pentathlon	Men's team	24 September
Bronze	Hiroko Makino	Swimming	Women's 200 m butterfly	24 September
Bronze	Daiya Seto	Swimming	Men's 200 m individual medley	24 September
Bronze	Yukimi Moriyama	Swimming	Women's 1500 m freestyle	24 September
Bronze	Takahiro Sekine	Fencing	Men's individual foil	24 September
Bronze	Shiho Yonekawa	Rowing	Women's single scull	25 September
Bronze	Kensuke Sasaoka	Skateboarding	Men's park	25 September
Bronze	Toki Sawada	Cycling	Men's cross country	25 September
Bronze	Yuhei Oino	Judo	Men's 81 kg	25 September
Bronze	Ryosuke Irie	Swimming	Men's 50 m backstroke	25 September
Bronze	Miki Takahashi	Swimming	Women's 50 m backstroke	25 September
Bronze	Hidenari Mano; Tomoru Honda; Taikan Tanaka; Katsuhiro Matsumoto; So Ogata	Swimming	Men's 4×200 m freestyle relay	25 September
Bronze	Masahiro Yanagida; Hiroto Nishiyama; Kazuyuki Takahashi; Takahiro Namba; Akito Yamazaki; Akihiro Fukatsu; Keihan Takahashi; Kento Asano; Yudai Arai; Hirohito Kashimura; Kenta Takanashi	Volleyball	Men's tournament	26 September
Bronze	Wakaba Tomita	Judo	Women's +78 kg	26 September
Bronze	Junya Matsumoto; Yu Okudaira; Takamasa Maruo; Taichi Yoshizawa; Ryota Kano; Moeki Fukushi; Yoshihiro Noguchi; Kippei Ishida; Josua Kerevi; Kippei Taninaka; Taisei Hayashi; Taiga Ishida	Rugby	Men's tournament	26 September
Bronze	Shogo Takeda	Swimming	Men's 1500 m freestyle	26 September
Bronze	Waka Kobori	Swimming	Women's 400 m freestyle	26 September
Bronze	Ryosuke Irie; Yuya Hinomoto; Katsuhiro Matsumoto; Katsumi Nakamura	Swimming	Men's 4×100 m freestyle relay	26 September
Bronze	Seri Ozaki	Fencing	Men's individual sabre	26 September
Bronze	Shibuki Iitsuka; Oura Nishida Capiglia	Sailing	Nacra 17	27 September
Bronze	Miyu Ito	Skateboarding	Women's street	27 September
Bronze	Kyosuke Matsuyama; Takahiro Shikine; Kenta Suzumura; Kazuki Iimura	Fencing	Men's team foil	27 September
Bronze	Hana Saito; Nozomi Sato; Miho Yoshimura; Haruna Baba	Fencing	Women's team épée	27 September
Bronze	Mio Narita	Swimming	Women's 400 m individual medley	27 September
Bronze	Sera Azuma; Yuka Ueno; Karin Miyawaki; Komaki Kikuchi	Fencing	Women's team foil	28 September
Bronze	Haruka Kaji	Tennis	Women's singles	28 September
Bronze	Wataru Tanigawa	Gymnastics	Men's rings	28 September
Bronze	Runa Imai	Swimming	Women's 200 m breaststroke	28 September
Bronze	Ippei Watanabe	Swimming	Men's 200 m breaststroke	28 September
Bronze	Katsumi Nakamura; Katsuhiro Matsumoto; Taikan Tanaka; Tomonobu Gomi; Shinri Shioura	Swimming	Men's 4×100 m freestyle relay	28 September
Bronze	Yutaro Murayama	Athletics	Men's 20 km walk	29 September
Bronze	Nanako Fujii	Athletics	Women's 20 km walk	29 September
Bronze	Kakeru Tanigawa	Gymnastics	Men's parallel bars	29 September
Bronze	Rikako Ikee	Swimming	Women's 50 m butterfly	29 September
Bronze	Kakeru Tanigawa	Gymnastics	Men's horizontal bar	29 September
Bronze	Hidekazu Takahara	Swimming	Men's 200 m backstroke	29 September
Bronze	Riyu Ohta	Cycling	Women's sprint	29 September
Bronze	Akane Yamaguchi; Aya Ohori; Saena Kawakami; Natsuki Nidaira; Nami Matsuyama; Chiharu Shida; Yuki Fukushima; Sayaka Hirota; Arisa Higashino; Naru Shinoya	Badminton	Women's team	30 September
Bronze	Kodai Naraoka; Kenta Nishimoto; Kanta Tsuneyama; Koki Watanabe; Takuro Hoki; Yugo Kobayashi; Akira Koga; Taichi Saito; Yuta Watanabe; Kyohei Yamashita	Badminton	Men's team	30 September
Bronze	Momoka Hanashima; Karin Imori; Mayu Lucy Kubota; Nanami Seki	Basketball	Women's tournament	30 September
Bronze	Seiya Sunada	Athletics	Men's 3000 m steeplechase	1 October
Bronze	Yumi Tanaka	Athletics	Women's 100 m hurdles	1 October
Bronze	Kazuhiro Yoshizawa	Equestrian	Individual eventing	2 October
Bronze	Miwa Harimoto; Miyuu Kihara	Table tennis	Individual eventing	2 October
Bronze	Asami Ueno; Risa Ueno; Rina Fujisawa	Go	Women's team	2 October
Bronze	Kotaro Seki; Toramaru Shibano; Ryo Ichiriki; Atsushi Sada; Yuta Iyama	Go	Men's team	3 October
Bronze	Keiji Mizumoto; Akihiro Inoue; Taishi Tanada; Seiji Komatsu	Canoeing	Men's kayak four 500 m	3 October
Bronze	Yuki Sato; Yota Ichikawa; Ryota Haruhara; Wataru Narawa; Seiya Takano; Toshitaka Naito	Sepak takraw	Men's quadrant	3 October
Bronze	Hiroto Yamada	Gymnastics	Men's trampoline	3 October
Bronze	Yuma Maruyama	Athletics	Men's heptathlon	3 October
Bronze	Tomoya Tsuboi	Boxing	Men's 51 kg	4 October
Bronze	Satomi Watanabe	Squash	Women's singles	4 October
Bronze	Sayaka Mikami	Diving	Women's 3 m springboard	4 October
Bronze	Masato Sumi	Wrestling	Men's Greco-Roman 87 kg	4 October
Bronze	Hiroki Yokoi; Masayuki Tanaka; Hiroaki Miura; Kazuo Furuta	Bridge	Men's team	4 October
Bronze	Mariko Morimoto	Athletics	Women's triple jump	4 October
Bronze	Rikuto Tamai	Diving	Men's 10 m platform	4 October
Bronze	Genki Dean	Athletics	Men's javelin throw	4 October
Bronze	Tomohiro Shinno	Athletics	Men's high jump	4 October
Bronze	Takahiro Tsuruda	Wrestling	Men's Greco-Roman 97 kg	5 October
Bronze	Naruha Matsuyuki	Wrestling	Women's freestyle 68 kg	6 October
Bronze	Kaiki Yamaguchi	Wrestling	Men's freestyle 65 kg	6 October
Bronze	Aya Ohori	Badminton	Women's singles	6 October
Bronze	Kodai Naraoka	Badminton	Men's singles	6 October
Bronze	Yuki Fukushima; Sayaka Hirota	Badminton	Women's doubles	6 October
Bronze	Haruka Okazaki	Canoeing	Women's canoe slalom	7 October
Bronze	Shuichiro Kayo; Makoto Hori; Shunya Morita; Mizuki Kato; Katsutoshi Satake; Kisho Iwamoto; Junichi Tazawa; Yoshiki Fuchigami; Yuki Katayama; Hisaya Nammoku; Ryo Kinami; Takehiro Tsujino; Hiroki Nakagawa; Jin Nakamura; Toshifumi Kaneko; Shoji Kitamura; Kazuya Shimokawa; Masashi Maruyama; Naoya Mochizuki; Ryuga Ihara; Motoki Mukoyama; Tatsuhiko Satoh; Kohei Sasagawa; Seifu Suzuki	Baseball	Men's tournament	7 October
Bronze	Yuzuki Sawae	Karate	Women's +68 kg kumite	7 October
Bronze	Ayumi Fukushima	Breakdancing	B-Girls	7 October

By sport events

Medals by sport
Sport	1st place, gold medalist(s)	2nd place, silver medalist(s)	3rd place, bronze medalist(s)	Total
Cycling	11	1	2	14
Swimming	5	10	15	30
Wrestling	5	3	4	12
Judo	5	3	2	10
Soft tennis	4	2	0	6
Triathlon	3	1	0	4
Karate	3	0	1	4
Gymnastics	2	7	4	13
Athletics	2	7	8	17
Fencing	2	3	5	10
Climbing	2	0	0	2
Skateboarding	1	1	2	4
Breakdancing	1	1	1	3
Boxing	1	1	1	3
Sailing	1	1	1	3
Football	1	1	0	2
Water polo	1	1	0	2
Handball	1	0	0	1
Softball	1	0	0	1
Rowing	0	3	1	4
Canoeing	0	2	2	4
Table tennis	0	2	1	3
Artistic swimming	0	2	0	2
Roller skating	0	2	0	2
Badminton	0	1	5	6
Diving	0	1	2	3
Basketball	0	1	1	2
Equestrian	0	1	1	2
Modern pentathlon	0	1	1	2
Rugby	0	1	1	2
Volleyball	0	1	1	2
Tennis	0	1	1	2
Archery	0	1	0	1
Beach volleyball	0	1	0	1
Field hockey	0	1	0	1
Marathon swimming	0	1	0	1
Taekwondo	0	1	0	1
Go	0	0	2	2
Baseball	0	0	1	1
Bridge	0	0	1	1
Sepak takraw	0	0	1	1
Squash	0	0	1	1
Total	52	67	69	188

Timeline

Medals by day
Day	Date	1st place, gold medalist(s)	2nd place, silver medalist(s)	3rd place, bronze medalist(s)	Total
1	September 24	2	7	5	14
2	September 25	3	7	7	16
3	September 26	3	6	7	16
4	September 27	7	7	5	19
5	September 28	3	3	6	12
6	September 29	9	5	7	12
7	September 30	1	3	2	6
8	October 1	1	3	3	7
9	October 2	4	3	3	10
10	October 3	0	3	5	8
11	October 4	4	4	9	17
12	October 5	7	3	1	11
13	October 6	3	3	5	11
14	October 7	4	9	4	17
15	October 8	1	1	0	2
Total		52	67	69	188

== Competitors ==
Sport	Men	Women	Total
Archery	3	3	6
Artistic swimming	1	9	10
Athletics	36	23	59
Badminton	10	10	20
Baseball	24	—N/a	24
Basketball	16	16	32
Boxing	5	5	20
Breakdancing	5	5	20
Bridge	6	2	8
Canoeing	10	5	15
Chess	2	—N/a	2
Cricket	15	—N/a	15
Cycling	14	9	22
Diving	3	4	7
Equestrian	8	3	11
Esports	12	—N/a	12
Fencing	12	12	24
Field hockey	18	18	36
Football	22	21	43
Go	5	3	8
Golf	4	3	7
Gymnastics	7	9	16
Handball	16	16	32
Judo	8	9	17
Kabaddi	10	—N/a	10
Karate	6	4	10
Kurash	1	1	2
Marathon swimming	2	1	3
Modern pentathlon	3	3	6
Roller skating	3	2	5
Rowing	9	9	18
Rugby sevens	12	12	24
Sailing	7	6	13
Sepak takraw	12	12	24
Shooting	8	6	14
Skateboarding	4	4	8
Softball	—N/a	17	17
Soft tennis	5	5	10
Climbing	3	3	6
Squash	3	3	6
Swimming	21	17	38
Table tennis	5	5	10
Taekwondo	3	3	6
Tennis	4	4	8
Triathlon	3	3	6
Volleyball	14	16	30
Water polo	13	11	24
Weightlifting	5	5	10
Wrestling	12	6	18
Wushu	3	3	6
Total	430	343	772

== Archery ==
Recurve

Athlete	Event	Ranking round		Round of 64	Round of 32	Round of 16	Quarterfinals	Semifinals	Final / BM	
Athlete	Event	Score	Seed	Opposition Score	Opposition Score	Opposition Score	Opposition Score	Opposition Score	Opposition Score	Rank
Takaharu Furukawa	Men's individual	660	24 Q	Nadeem (PAK); W 7–1	Baatarkhuyagiin (MGL); L 5–6	Did not advance				17
Junya Nakanishi	Men's individual	650	32 Q	Alwi (KSA); W 6–5	Sadikov (UZB); L 4–6	Did not advance				17
Fumiya Saito	Men's individual	645	37	Did not advance						
Takaharu Furukawa; Junya Nakanishi; Fumiya Saito	Men's team	1955	9 Q	—N/a		Kazakhstan (KAZ); W 5–1	South Korea (KOR); L 1–5	Did not advance		8
Satsuki Noda	Women's individual	656	9 Q	Bye	Altangerel (MGL); W 6–5	Ku Nurin Afiqah (MAS); W 6–4	Li (CHN); L 0–6	Did not advance		8
Tomomi Sugimoto	Women's individual	653	11 Q	Bye	Fallah (IRN); W 7–1	Octavia (INA); W 7–3	Hai (CHN); L 3–7	Did not advance		6
Azusa Yamauchi	Women's individual	627	30	Did not advance						
Satsuki Noda; Tomomi Sugimoto; Azusa Yamauchi	Women's team	1936	4 Q	—N/a		Mongolia (MGL); W 6–0	India (IND); L 2–6	Did not advance		6
Satsuki Noda; Takaharu Furukawa	Mixed team	1316	6 Q	—N/a		Bangladesh (BAN); W 5–3	Chinese Taipei (TPE); W 5–4	Iran (IRN); W 6–0	South Korea (KOR); L 0–6	2nd place, silver medalist(s)

== Athletics ==
Track & road events

Athlete	Event	Heat		Semifinal		Final	
Athlete	Event	Result	Rank	Result	Rank	Result	Rank
Yoshihide Kiryū	Men's 100 m	10.27	2 Q	10.23	4	Did not advance	
Yuki Koike	Men's 100 m	10.27	1 Q	10.22	5	Did not advance	
Koki Ueyama	Men's 200 m	20.82	1 Q	20.77	2 Q	20.60	1st place, gold medalist(s)
Shoto Uno	Men's 200 m	20.87	2 Q	20.77	4 q	21.07	8
Fuga Sato	Men's 400 m	45.56	1 Q	—N/a		45.70	4
Kentaro Sato	Men's 400 m	45.57	1 Q	—N/a		45.57	2nd place, silver medalist(s)
Sho Kawamoto	Men's 800 m	1:52.93	5	—N/a		Did not advance	
Kazuki Kawamura	Men's 1500 m	3:54.11	6 Q	—N/a		3:44.71	9
Keita Satoh	Men's 5000 m	—N/a				13:39.18	6
Kazuya Shiojiri	Men's 10,000 m	—N/a				28:35.02	5
Ren Tazawa	Men's 10,000 m	—N/a				28:18.66	4
Shuhei Ishikawa	Men's 110 m hurdles	13.71	2 Q	—N/a		13.63	5
Shunya Takayama	Men's 110 m hurdles	13.80	3 Q	—N/a		13.41	1st place, gold medalist(s)
Yusaku Kodama	Men's 400 m hurdles	49.99	3 q	—N/a		DQ	
Kazuki Kurokawa	Men's 400 m hurdles	49.80	1 Q	—N/a		49.21	4
Ryoma Aoki	Men's 3000 m steeplechase	—N/a				8:23.75	2nd place, silver medalist(s)
Seiya Sunada	Men's 3000 m steeplechase	—N/a				8:26.47	3rd place, bronze medalist(s)
Yoshihide Kiryū; Yuki Koike; Koki Ueyama; Shoto Uno	Men's 4 x 100 m relay	38.99	1 Q	—N/a		38.44	2nd place, silver medalist(s)
Yohei Ikeda	Men's marathon	—N/a				2:15:04	6
Toshiki Sadakata	Men's marathon	—N/a				2:13:51	4
Yutaro Murayama	Men's 20 km walk	—N/a				1:24:41	3rd place, bronze medalist(s)
Tomohiro Noda	Men's 20 km walk	—N/a				1:27:08	4
Ayano Shiomi	Women's 800 m	2:06.37	3 q	—N/a		2:05.21	5
Yume Goto	Women's 1500 m	—N/a				4:19.45	5
Ririka Hironaka	Women's 5000 m	—N/a				15:15.34	2nd place, silver medalist(s)
Yuma Yamamoto	Women's 5000 m	—N/a				15:30.08 PB	4
Ririka Hironaka	Women's 10,000 m	—N/a				31:50.74	2nd place, silver medalist(s)
Masumi Aoki	Women's 100 m hurdles	13.38	3 Q	—N/a		13.34	5
Yumi Tanaka	Women's 100 m hurdles	13.10	3 Q	—N/a		13.04	3rd place, bronze medalist(s)
Ami Yamamoto	Women's 400 m hurdles	57.55	4 q	—N/a		57.66	7
Hikari Ohnishi	Women's marathon	—N/a				2:30:06	5
Mirai Waku	Women's marathon	—N/a				2:40:54	13
Nanako Fujii	Women's 20 km walk	—N/a				1:33:49	3rd place, bronze medalist(s)
Yukiko Umeno	Women's 20 km walk	—N/a				1:39:44	4
Masumi Fuchise; Maika Yagi; Subaru Ishida; Hayato Katsuki	Mixed 35 km walk team	—N/a				5:22:11	2nd place, silver medalist(s)

Field events

Athlete	Event	Qualification		Final	
Athlete	Event	Distance	Position	Distance	Position
Ryoichi Akamatsu	Men's high jump	2.15	2 q	2.19	6
Tomohiro Shinno	Men's high jump	2.15	2 q	2.29	3rd place, bronze medalist(s)
Seito Yamamoto	Men's pole vault	—N/a		NM	
Shotaro Shiroyama	Men's long jump	7.21	14	Did not advance	
Natsuki Yamakawa	Men's long jump	7.63	8 q	7.61	10
Shota Fukuda	Men's hammer throw	—N/a		68.74	6
Ryota Kashimura	Men's hammer throw	—N/a		70.72	4
Genki Dean	Men's javelin	—N/a		82.68	3rd place, bronze medalist(s)
Kenji Ogura	Men's javelin	—N/a		77.87	5
Yuma Maruyama	Men's decathlon	—N/a		7568	3rd place, bronze medalist(s)
Shun Taue	Men's decathlon	—N/a		7271	4
Misaki Morota	Women's pole vault	—N/a		4.48 PB	2nd place, silver medalist(s)
Sumire Hata	Women's long jump	—N/a		6.48	4
Mariko Morimoto	Women's triple jump	—N/a		13.78	3rd place, bronze medalist(s)
Joyiris McAarthur	Women's hammer throw	—N/a		61.01	6
Marina Saito	Women's javelin throw	—N/a		61.10	4
Sae Takemoto	Women's javelin throw	—N/a		55.39	6
Karin Odama	Women's heptathlon	—N/a		5605	6
Yuki Yamasaki	Women's heptathlon	—N/a		5616	5

== Badminton ==
=== Men ===
Athlete	Event	Round of 64	Round of 32	Round of 16	Quarterfinals	Semifinals	Final	
Athlete	Event	Opposition Score	Opposition Score	Opposition Score	Opposition Score	Opposition Score	Opposition Score	Rank
Kodai Naraoka	Singles	Bye	Bhatti (PAK); W 2–0	Kidambi (IND); W 2–0	Ng (MAS); W 2–0	Shi (CHN); L 0–2	Did not advance	3rd place, bronze medalist(s)
Kenta Nishimoto	Singles	Dahal (NEP); W 2–0	Jeon (KOR); W 2–0	Li (CHN); L 0–2	Did not advance			
Takuro Hoki; Yugo Kobayashi	Doubles	—N/a	Arjun/Kapila (IND); W 0–0^{r}	Lee/Wang (TPE) wd	Did not advance			
Akira Koga; Taichi Saito	Doubles	—N/a	Kang/Seo (KOR); L 1–2	Did not advance				
Kodai Naraoka; Kenta Nishimoto; Kanta Tsuneyama; Kento Momota; Takuro Hoki; Yugo Kobayashi; Akira Koga; Taichi Saito; Yuta Watanabe; Kyohei Yamashita	Team	—N/a	—N/a	Singapore (SGP); W 3–0	Hong Kong (HKG); W 3–1	China (CHN); L 0–3	Did not advance	3rd place, bronze medalist(s)

=== Women ===
Athlete	Event	Round of 64	Round of 32	Round of 16	Quarterfinals	Semifinals	Final	
Athlete	Event	Opposition Score	Opposition Score	Opposition Score	Opposition Score	Opposition Score	Opposition Score	Rank
Aya Ohori	Singles	Bye	Lo (HKG); W 2–0	Tai (TPE); W 2–0	Tunjung (INA); W 2–0	Chen (CHN); L 1–2	Did not advance	3rd place, bronze medalist(s)
Natsuki Nidaira	Singles	Bye	He (CHN); L 1–2	Did not advance				
Nami Matsuyama; Chiharu Shida	Doubles	—N/a	Go/Siow (MAS); W 2–0	Aimsaard/Aimsaard (THA); W 2–0	Chen/Jia (CHN); L 0–2	Did not advance		
Yuki Fukushima; Sayaka Hirota	Doubles	—N/a	Bye	Rahayu/Ramadhanti (INA); W 0–0^{r}	Zhang/Zheng (CHN); W 2–1	Baek/Lee (KOR); L 0–2	Did not advance	3rd place, bronze medalist(s)
Akane Yamaguchi; Aya Ohori; Saena Kawakami; Natsuki Nidaira; Nami Matsuyama; Chiharu Shida; Yuki Fukushima; Sayaka Hirota; Arisa Higashino; Naru Shinoya	Team	—N/a	—N/a	Bye	Chinese Taipei (TPE); W 3–1	China (CHN); L 1–3	Did not advance	3rd place, bronze medalist(s)

=== Mixed ===
Athlete	Event	Round of 64	Round of 32	Round of 16	Quarterfinals	Semifinals	Final	
Athlete	Event	Opposition Score	Opposition Score	Opposition Score	Opposition Score	Opposition Score	Opposition Score	Rank
Yuta Watanabe; Arisa Higashino	Doubles	—N/a	Bye	Rivaldy/Mentari (INA); W 2–0	Tang/Tse (HKG); W 2–0	Feng/Huang (CHN)		
Kyohei Yamashita; Naru Shinoya	Doubles	—N/a	Lee/Ng (HKG); L 0–2	Did not advance				

== Boxing ==
Athlete	Event	Round of 32	Round of 16	Quarterfinals	Semifinals	Final	
Athlete	Event	Opposition Result	Opposition Result	Opposition Result	Opposition Result	Opposition Result	Rank
Tomoya Tsuboi	Men's 51 kg	Bye	Deepak (IND); W 4–1	Diushebaev (KGZ); W 5–0	Dusmatov (UZB); L 1–4	Did not advance	3rd place, bronze medalist(s)
Shudai Harada	Men's 57 kg	Majrashi (KSA); W 5–0	Gantömöriin (MGL); W 4–1	Hossain (BAN); W 5–0	Juntrong (THA); W 3–2	Khalokov (UZB); L KO	2nd place, silver medalist(s)
Yuta Akiyama	Men's 63.5 kg	Choe (PRK); L 1–4	Did not advance				
Sewon Okazawa	Men's 71 kg	Bye	Ishaish (JOR); W 4–1	Nishant (IND); W 5–0	Shymbergenov (KAZ); W 3–2	Kan (TPE); W w/o	1st place, gold medalist(s)
Issei Aramoto	Men's 80 kg	Bye	Jongjoho (THA); L RSC	Did not advance			
Tsukimi Namiki	Women's 50 kg	Bye	Raksat (THA); L 0–5	Did not advance			
Rinka Kinoshita	Women's 54 kg	—N/a	Gurung (NEP); W 5–0	Uktamova (UZB); L 0–5	Did not advance		
Satsuki Yoshizawa	Women's 57 kg	—N/a	Chan (MAC); W RSC	Samadova (TJK); L 0–5	Did not advance		
Ayaka Taguchi	Women's 60 kg	Bye	Tögsjargalyn (MGL); L 0–5	Did not advance			
Mai Kito	Women's 66 kg	—N/a	Seon (KOR); L 0–5	Did not advance			

== Canoeing ==
=== Slalom ===
Athlete	Event	Heats		Semifinals		Final	
Athlete	Event	Best	Rank	Time	Rank	Time	Rank
Shota Saito	Men's C-1	97.75	5	101.41	3	Did not advance	
Shota Sasaki	Men's C-1	99.59	6	97.20	1	103.98	4
Kosuke Saito	Men's K-1	95.29	3	105.31	6	Did not advance	
Yuuki Tanaka	Men's K-1	87.55	1	100.44	3	92.15	2nd place, silver medalist(s)
Kurumi Ito	Women's K-1	102.70	2	127.33	4	DNF	

=== Sprint ===
Athlete	Event	Heats		Semifinals		Final	
Athlete	Event	Time	Rank	Time	Rank	Time	Rank
Masato Hashimoto; Ryo Naganuma	Men's C-2 500 m	1:48.569	2 QF	Bye		1:49.237	2nd place, silver medalist(s)
Akihiro Inoue; Seiji Komatsu; Keiji Mizumoto; Taishi Tanada	Men's K-4 500 m	1:26.563	2 QF	Bye		1:25.751	3rd place, bronze medalist(s)
Mio Kobayashi	Women's C-1 200 m	54.799	4 QS	51.883	1 QF	50.766	8
Mio Kobayashi; Megumi Tsubota	Women's C-2 500 m	—N/a				2:16.868	8
Hideka Tatara	Women's K-1 500 m	2:06.635	1 QF	Bye		2:04.798	4

== Cycling ==
=== BMX ===
Athlete	Event	Seeding		Motos		Final	
Athlete	Event	Result	Rank	Points	Rank	Result	Rank
Asuma Nakai	Men's race	39.323	3	3	1	37.542	1st place, gold medalist(s)

=== Mountain biking ===
Athlete	Event	Time	Rank
Toki Sawada	Men's cross-country	1:40:27	3rd place, bronze medalist(s)
Akari Kobayashi	Women's cross-country	Did not finish	

=== Road ===
Athlete	Event	Time	Rank
Yukiya Arashiro	Men's road race	4:31:11	7
Yuma Koishi	Men's road race	4:32:50	25
Yuma Koishi	Men's time trial	51:27.95	7
Maho Kakita	Women's road race	3:36:07	6
Eri Yonamine	Women's road race	3:36:07	13
Eri Yonamine	Women's time trial	25:35.59	2nd place, silver medalist(s)

=== Track ===
Sprint

Athlete	Event	Qualification		Round 1	Repechage 1	Round 2	Repechage 2	Quarterfinals	Semifinals	Final	
Athlete	Event	Time Speed (km/h)	Rank	Opposition Time Speed	Opposition Time Speed	Opposition Time Speed	Opposition Time Speed	Opposition Time	Opposition Time	Opposition Time	Rank
Shinji Nakano	Men's sprint	9.821	4 Q	Laitonjam (IND); W 9.918; 72.595	Bye	Ponomaryov (KAZ); W 9.753; 73.823	Bye	Sahrom (MAS); L 9.602; L 9.609	Did not advance	Race for 5–8th place Kang (TPE): L Sahrom (MAS): W Elkatohchoongo (IND): W 10.470	6
Kaiya Ota	Men's sprint	9.688	2 Q	Angsuthasawit (THA); W 10.011; 71.921	Bye	Kang (KOR); W 9.616; 74.875	Bye	Elkatohchoongo (IND); W 9.561; W 9.939	Xue (CHN); W 9.814; W 10.081	Zhou (CHN); W 9.955; W 9.983	1st place, gold medalist(s)
Riyu Ohta	Women's sprint	10.648; 67.618	4 Q	Chen (TPE); W 11.126; 64.713	Bye	Ng (HKG); W 11.310; 63.660	Bye	Lee (KOR); W 11.096; W 10.941	Yuan (CHN); W 11.032; L 11.237; L 11.606	Guo (CHN); L 10.966; W 12.847; W 10.754	3rd place, bronze medalist(s)
Mina Sato	Women's sprint	10.587; 68.008	2 Q	Paul (IND); W 10.733; 67.083	Bye	Wang (TPE); W 11.761; 61.219	Bye	Rasee (THA); W 11.617; W 11.418	Guo (CHN); W 10.983; W 11.217	Yuan (CHN); W 11.151; W 10.844	1st place, gold medalist(s)

Keirin

Athlete	Event	Round 1	Repechage	Round 2	Final
Athlete	Event	Rank	Rank	Rank	Rank
Shinji Nakano	Men's keirin	1 Q	Bye	1 F	4
Kaiya Ota	Men's keirin	1 Q	Bye	5	7
Riyu Ohta	Women's keirin	1 Q	Bye	3 Q	6
Mina Sato	Women's keirin	1 Q	Bye	1 Q	1st place, gold medalist(s)

Omnium

Athlete	Event	Scratch race		Tempo race		Elimination race		Points race		Total points	Rank
Athlete	Event	Rank	Points	Rank	Points	Rank	Points	Rank	Points	Total points	Rank
Kazushige Kuboki	Men's omnium	2	38	3	36	9	24	1	80	178	1st place, gold medalist(s)
Yumi Kajihara	Women's omnium	1	40	2	38	1	40	1	20	138	1st place, gold medalist(s)

Madison

Athlete	Event	Points	Laps	Rank
Shunsuke Imamura; Naoki Kojima	Men's madison	54	0	1st place, gold medalist(s)
Maho Kakita; Tsuyaka Uchino	Women's madison	50	0	1st place, gold medalist(s)

Team

Athlete	Event	Qualification		Round 1	Final	
Athlete	Event	Time Speed (km/h)	Rank	Opposition Time Speed	Opposition Time Speed	Rank
Yoshitaku Nagasako; Shinji Nakano; Yuta Obara; Kaiya Ota	Men's team sprint	43.954	2 Q	India (IND); W 43.330; 62.312	China (CHN); W 42.934; 62.887	1st place, gold medalist(s)
Eiya Hashimoto; Naoki Kojima; Kazushige Kuboki; Shoi Matsuda; Shunsuke Imamura	Men's team pursuit	3:58.584; 60.356	1	Kazakhstan (KAZ); W 4:00.843; 59.790	China (CHN); W 3:52.757; 61.867	1st place, gold medalist(s)
Mizuki Ikeda; Yumi Kajihara; Maho Kakita; Tsuyaka Uchino	Women's team pursuit	4:26.932; 53.946	1 Q	Hong Kong (HKG); W	China (CHN); W 4:21.224 GR; 55.125	1st place, gold medalist(s)

== Diving ==
Athlete	Event	Preliminary		Final	
Athlete	Event	Points	Rank	Points	Rank
Yuto Araki	Men's 3 m springboard	322.65	9 Q	369.95	7
Haruki Suyama	Men's 3 m springboard	Did not start		Did not advance	
Yuto Araki; Haruki Suyama	Men's synchronized 3 m springboard	—N/a		368.31	4
Rikuto Tamai	Men's synchronized 10 m platform	438.20	3 Q	480.50	3rd place, bronze medalist(s)
Haruka Enomoto	Women's 1 m springboard	—N/a		247.30	5
Haruka Enomoto	Women's 3 m springboard	277.5	5 Q	270.35	5
Sayaka Mikami	Women's 3 m springboard	301.05	4 Q	304.65	3rd place, bronze medalist(s)
Matsuri Arai	Women's 10 m platform	290.90	3 Q	279.30	4
Matsuri Arai; Minami Itahashi	Women's synchronized 10 m platform	—N/a		290.04	2nd place, silver medalist(s)

== Fencing ==
Men

Athlete	Event	Preliminary		Round of 32	Round of 16	Quarterfinals	Semifinals	Final	
Athlete	Event	` Opposition Score `	Rank	` Opposition Score `	` Opposition Score `	` Opposition Score `	` Opposition Score `	` Opposition Score `	Rank
Koki Kano	Men's épée	Ng (HKG): L 2–3; Odeh (JOR): L 2–5; Almaazmi (UAE): W 4–2; Alimov (UZB): W 5–3; Batchuluun (MGL): W 5–1; Awan (PAK): W 5–1	10 Q	Almaazmi (UAE); W 15–7	Kweon (KOR); W 12–11	Ng (HKG); 14–9	Alimzhanov (KAZ); W 15–9	Komata (JPN); W 15–7	1st place, gold medalist(s)
Akira Komata	Men's épée	Petrov (KGZ): W 5–3; Nguyen (VIE): L 4–5; Kweon (KOR): L 2–5; Jose (PHI): W 5–2; Alzarooni (UAE): L 4–5	17 Q	Chaloemchanen (THA); W 15–8	Kurbanov (KAZ); W 15–14	Kim (KOR); W 15–11	Ho (HKG); W 15–12	Kano (JPN); L 7–15	2nd place, silver medalist(s)
Koki Kano; Akira Komata; Ryu Matsumoto; Masaru Yamada	Team épée	—N/a				Saudi Arabia (KSA); W 45–43	South Korea (KOR); W 45–34	Kazakhstan (KAZ); W 36–35	1st place, gold medalist(s)
Kyosuke Matsuyama	Men's foil	Au (SGP): W 5–0; Lam (MAC): W 5–1; Hussein (QAT): W 5–1; Chen (TPE): W 5–2; Sadullaev (UZB): W 5–1	1 Q	Bye	Nassar (KUW); W 15–2	Shikine (JPN); L 14–15	Did not advance		5
Takahiro Shikine	Men's foil	Wu (MAC): W 5–0; Chen (CHN): L 1–5; Nassar (KUW): W 5–4; Lock (SGP): L 3–5; Kathiresan (IND): W 5–2	9 Q	Bye	Khalifa (QAT); W 15–4	Matsuyama (JPN); W 15–14	Cheung (HKG); L14–15	Did not advance	3rd place, bronze medalist(s)
Kazuki Iimura; Kyosuke Matsuyama; Takahiro Shikine; Kenta Suzumura	Team foil	—N/a				Qatar (QAT); W 45–30	China (CHN); L 44–45	Did not advance	3rd place, bronze medalist(s)
Kaito Streets	Men's sabre	Yan (CHN): L 3–5; Nguyen (VIE): W 5–2; Oh (KOR): L4–5; Ho (HKG): W 5–1; Abdulkareem (KUW): W 5–1; Gajurel (NEP): W 5–0	8 Q	Bye	Aymuratov (UZB); L 13–15	Did not advance			11
Kento Yoshida	Men's sabre	Alshamlan (KUW): L 4–5; Wiriyatangsakul (THA): W 5–3; Sattarkhan (KAZ): L 1–5; Almasri (JOR): W 5–2; Shen (CHN): W 5–4	12 Q	Alamr (KSA); W 15–8	Rahbari-Koyakhi (IRI); L 9–15	Did not advance			12
Mao Kokubo; Kaito Streets; Hayato Tsubo; Kento Yoshida	Team sabre	—N/a		Saudi Arabia (KSA); W 45–36	South Korea (KOR); L 26–45	Did not advance			8

Women

Athlete	Event	Preliminary		Round of 32	Round of 16	Quarterfinals	Semifinals	Final	
Athlete	Event	` Opposition Score `	Rank	Opposition Score	` Opposition Score `	` Opposition Score `	` Opposition Score `	` Opposition Score `	Rank
Nozomi Sato	Women's épée	Arora (IND): W 5–3; Abdyl-Khamitova (KGZ): W 5–1; Alahdal (YEM): W 5–1; Pistsova (KAZ): L 2–5; Hsieh (HKG): L 0–2	14	Mansi (JOR); W 15–8	Hsieh (HKG); W 13–11	Murzataeva (UZB); L 14–15	Did not advance		8
Miho Yoshimura	Women's épée	Murzataeva (UZB): W 5–4; Alzaabi (UAE): W 3–2; Men (CAM): W 5–3; Choi (KOR): L 2–5; Thannee (THA): W 5–3	10 Q	Alzaabi (UAE); W 15–3	Pistsova (KAZ); L 9–15	Did not advance			14
Haruna Baba; Hana Saito; Nozomi Sato; Miho Yoshimura	Team épée	—N/a			Mongolia (MGL); W 45–20	Uzbekistan (UZB); W 45–32	Hong Kong (HKG); L 26–45	Did not advance	3rd place, bronze medalist(s)
Sera Azuma	Women's foil	Ku (MAC): L 3–5; Smithisukul (THA): W 5–1; Thapa (NEP): W 5–0; Hong (KOR): W 5–4; Majali (JOR): W 5–0; Chan (HKG): L 4–5	6 Q	—N/a	Wong (SGP); W 15–3	Huang (CHN); L 10–11	Did not advance		6
Yuka Ueno	Women's foil	Wong (SGP): W 5–2; Acharya (NEP): W 5–1; Hong (KOR): L 4–5; Shinnakerdchoke (THA): W 5–0; Huang (CHN): W 5–3	4 Q	—N/a	Shinnakerdchoke (THA); W 15–4	Cheng (HKG); W 15–10	Thapa (NEP); W15–7	Huang (CHN); L 8–15	2nd place, silver medalist(s)
Sera Azuma; Komaki Kikuchi; Karin Miyawaki; Yuka Ueno	Team foil	—N/a				Nepal (NEP); W 45–10	China (CHN); L 29–45	Did not advance	3rd place, bronze medalist(s)
Seri Ozaki	Women's sabre	Nicanor (PHI): W 5–3; Shao (CHN): W 5–3; Phokaew (THA): W 5–2; Sarybay (KAZ): L 4–5	5 Q	Bye	Leung (HKG); W 15–13	Dospay (KAZ); W 15–13	Shao (CHN); L 13–15	Did not advance	3rd place, bronze medalist(s)
Shihomi Fukushima	Women's sabre	Pliego (UZB): W 5–2; Almasri (KSA): W 5–1; Yoon (KOR): L 3–4; Leung (HKG): W 5–4	7 Q	Bye	Daybekova (UZB); L 12–15	Did not advance			10
Misaki Emura; Shihomi Fukushima; Seri Ozaki; Kanae Kobayashi	Team sabre	—N/a				Kazakhstan (KAZ); W 45–20	South Korea (KOR); W 45–42	Uzbekistan (UZB); L 42–45	2nd place, silver medalist(s)

== Football ==
Both of Japan men's team and women's team were drawn in Group D at the Games.

Team	Event	Group Stage				Round of 16	Quarterfinals	Semifinals	Final / BM	
Team	Event	Opposition Score	Opposition Score	Opposition Score	Rank	Opposition Score	Opposition Score	Opposition Score	Opposition Score	Rank
Japan men's	Men's tournament	Qatar; W 3–1	Palestine; W 1–0	—N/a	1 Q	Myanmar; W 7–0	North Korea; W 2–1	Hong Kong; W 4–0	South Korea; L 1–2	2nd place, silver medalist(s)
Japan women's	Women's tournament	Bangladesh; W 8–0	Nepal; W 8–0	Vietnam; W 7–0	1 Q	—N/a	Philippines; W 8–1	China; W 4–3	North Korea; W 4–1	1st place, gold medalist(s)

=== Men's tournament ===
Roster

The following 22 players list is the Japan squad for the 2022 Asian Games.

Kotaro Uchino replaced the injured Naoki Kumata on 15 September 2023. Shun Ayukawa replaced another injured player, Yudai Kimura, on 20 September 2023.

Head coach: (Japan) Go Oiwa

No.	Pos.	Player	Date of birth (age)	Club
1	GK	Kazuki Fujita	19 February 2001 (aged 22)	(Japan Football Association) Tochigi SC
2	DF	Hayato Okuda	21 April 2001 (aged 22)	(Japan Football Association) Momoyama Gakuin University
3	DF	Manato Yoshida	16 November 2001 (aged 21)	(Japan Football Association) NIFS Kanoya
4	DF	Taichi Yamasaki	8 January 2001 (aged 22)	(Japan Football Association) Sanfrecce Hiroshima
5	DF	Seiya Baba	24 October 2001 (aged 21)	(Japan Football Association) Hokkaido Consadole Sapporo
6	MF	Daiki Matsuoka	1 June 2001 (aged 22)	(Brazilian Football Confederation) Novorizontino
7	DF	Ibuki Konno	10 May 2001 (aged 22)	(Japan Football Association) Hosei University
8	MF	Masato Shigemi	20 September 2001 (aged 21)	(Japan Football Association) Fukuoka University
9	FW	Shun Ayukawa	15 September 2001 (aged 22)	(Japan Football Association) Oita Trinita
10	MF	Jun Nishikawa	21 February 2002 (aged 21)	(Japan Football Association) Sagan Tosu
11	MF	Yuta Matsumura	13 April 2001 (aged 22)	(Japan Football Association) Kashima Antlers
12	GK	Yuma Obata	7 November 2001 (aged 21)	(Japan Football Association) Vegalta Sendai
13	MF	Kein Sato	11 July 2001 (aged 22)	(German Football Association) Werder Bremen II
14	MF	Yota Komi	11 August 2002 (aged 21)	(Japan Football Association) Albirex Niigata
15	MF	Teppei Yachida	1 November 2001 (aged 21)	(Japan Football Association) Kyoto Sanga
16	MF	Kakeru Yamauchi	6 January 2002 (aged 21)	(Japan Football Association) University of Tsukuba
17	MF	Shota Hino	16 October 2002 (aged 20)	(Japan Football Association) Takushoku University
18	GK	Taiki Yamada	8 January 2002 (aged 21)	(Japan Football Association) Fagiano Okayama
19	FW	Kotaro Uchino	19 June 2004 (aged 19)	(Japan Football Association) University of Tsukuba
20	MF	Koshiro Sumi	13 August 2002 (aged 21)	(Japan Football Association) University of Tsukuba
21	DF	Kenta Nemoto	13 December 2002 (aged 20)	(Japan Football Association) Ryutsu Keizai University
22	DF	Hiroki Sekine	11 August 2002 (aged 21)	(Japan Football Association) Takushoku University

Group D

Pos	Team	Pld	W	D	L	GF	GA	GD	Pts	Qualification
1	Japan	2	2	0	0	4	1	+3	6	Knockout stage
2	Palestine	2	0	1	1	0	1	−1	1	Knockout stage
3	Qatar	2	0	1	1	1	3	−2	1	Knockout stage

Source: Football – Men – Groups
Rules for classification: Group stage tiebreakers
20 September 2023
19:30

Japan	3–1	Qatar
Yachida 2'; Uchino 25'; Yamasaki 88'	Report	Al Sulaiti 79'

Xiaoshan Sports Centre Stadium, Hangzhou
Attendance: 5,904
Referee: Kim Hee-gon (South Korea)

25 September 2023
19:30

Palestine	0–1	Japan
	Report	Yachida 22'

Xiaoshan Sports Centre Stadium, Hangzhou
Attendance: 6,417
Referee: Nazmi Nasaruddin (Malaysia)

Round of 16

28 September 2023
19:30 UTC+8

Japan	7–0	Myanmar
Sato 12', 27'; Ayukawa 26', 35'; Sumi 42'; Uchino 66'; Hino 73'	Report

Xiaoshan Sports Centre Stadium, Hangzhou
Attendance: 7,217
Referee: Clifford Daypuyat (Philippines)

Quarterfinal

1 October 2023
19:30 UTC+8

Japan	2–1	North Korea
Uchino 50'; Matsumura 80' (pen.)	Report	Kim Kuk-bom 74'

Xiaoshan Sports Centre Stadium, Hangzhou
Attendance: 7,476
Referee: Rustam Lutfullin (Uzbekistan)

Semifinal

4 October 2023
18:00 UTC+8

Hong Kong	0–4	Japan
	Report	Ayukawa 23'; Hino 54', 86'; Komi 74'

Xiaoshan Sports Centre Stadium, Hangzhou
Attendance: 7,456
Referee: Qasim Al-Hatmi (Oman)

Final

7 October 2023
20:00 UTC+8

(gold) South Korea	2–1	Japan (silver)
Jeong Woo-yeong 27'; Cho Young-wook 56'	Report	Uchino 2'

Huanglong Sports Centre Stadium, Hangzhou
Attendance: 38,018
Referee: Ammar Mahfoodh (Bahrain)

=== Women's tournament ===
Roster

The following players were called up for the 2022 Asian Games.

Head Coach: Michihisa Kano (狩野 倫久)

No.	Pos.	Player	Date of birth (age)	Caps	Goals	Club
1	GK	Natsumi Asano (浅野 菜摘)	14 April 1997 (age 29)	0	0	(Japan Football Association) Chifure AS Elfen Saitama
12	GK	Shu Ohba (大場 朱羽)	11 July 2002 (age 24)	0	0	(United States Soccer Federation) Ole Miss Rebels
18	GK	Mamiko Matsumoto (松本 真未子)	9 October 1997 (age 28)	0	0	(Japan Football Association) MyNavi Sendai
2	DF	Shinomi Koyama (小山 史乃観)	31 January 2005 (age 21)	1	0	(Japan Football Association) Cerezo Osaka Yanmar
3	DF	Haruna Tabata (田畑 晴菜)	27 May 2002 (age 24)	0	0	(Japan Football Association) MyNavi Sendai
4	DF	Wakaba Goto (後藤 若葉)	4 June 2001 (age 25)	0	0	(Japan Football Association) Waseda University
6	DF	Rio Sasaki (佐々木 里緒)	17 September 2004 (age 22)	0	0	(Japan Football Association) MyNavi Sendai
17	DF	Toko Koga (古賀 塔子)	6 January 2006 (age 20)	0	0	(Japan Football Association) JFA Academy Fukushima
5	MF	Reina Wakisaka (脇阪 麗奈)	2 May 1999 (age 27)	0	0	(Japan Football Association) Cerezo Osaka Yanmar
8	MF	Chihiro Ishida (石田 千尋)	20 December 2001 (age 24)	0	0	(Japan Football Association) Albirex Niigata
10	MF	Yuzuho Shiokoshi (塩越 柚歩) (captain)	1 November 1997 (age 28)	5	2	(Japan Football Association) Urawa Red Diamonds
11	MF	Yoshino Nakashima (中嶋 淑乃)	27 July 1999 (age 27)	1	0	(Japan Football Association) Sanfrecce Hiroshima Regina
14	MF	Momoko Tanikawa (谷川 萌々子)	7 May 2005 (age 21)	0	0	(Japan Football Association) JFA Academy Fukushima
16	MF	Suzu Amano (天野 紗)	18 February 2004 (age 22)	0	0	(Japan Football Association) INAC Kobe Leonessa
21	MF	Kotono Sakakibara (榊原 琴乃)	11 October 2004 (age 21)	0	0	(Japan Football Association) Nojima Stella Sagamihara
7	FW	Yuzuki Yamamoto (山本 柚月)	1 September 2002 (age 24)	0	0	(Japan Football Association) Tokyo Verdy Beleza
9	FW	Mami Ueno (上野 真実)	27 September 1996 (age 29)	10	1	(Japan Football Association) Sanfrecce Hiroshima Regina
13	FW	Mei Shimada (島田 芽依)	8 May 2002 (age 24)	0	0	(Japan Football Association) Urawa Red Diamonds
15	FW	Remina Chiba (千葉 玲海菜)	30 April 1999 (age 27)	5	2	(Japan Football Association) JEF United Chiba
19	FW	Maya Hijikata (土方 麻耶)	13 April 2004 (age 22)	0	0	(Japan Football Association) Tokyo Verdy Beleza
20	FW	Haruka Osawa (大澤 春花)	15 April 2001 (age 25)	0	0	(Japan Football Association) JEF United Chiba

Group D

Pos	Team	Pld	W	D	L	GF	GA	GD	Pts	Qualification
1	Japan	3	3	0	0	23	0	+23	9	Knockout stage
2	Vietnam	3	2	0	1	8	8	0	6	
3	Nepal	3	0	1	2	1	11	−10	1	
4	Bangladesh	3	0	1	2	2	15	−13	1	

Source: Football – Women – Groups
Rules for classification: Group stage tiebreakers
22 September 2023
19:30 UTC+8

Japan	8–0	Bangladesh
Chiba 7', 29'; Tanikawa 8' (pen.), 80'; Shiokoshi 45'; Hijikata 49'; Sakakibara 58', 85'	Report

Wenzhou Olympic Sports Center Stadium, Wenzhou
Attendance: 2,744
Referee: Kim Yu-jeong (South Korea)

25 September 2023
19:30 UTC+8

Nepal	0–8	Japan
	Report	Shiokoshi 3'; Yamamoto 13'; Ueno 27'; Wakisaka 30'; Osawa 36' (pen.), 75'; Sakakibara 59'; Hijikata 90+7'

Wenzhou Olympic Sports Center Stadium, Wenzhou
Attendance: 6,195
Referee: Pich Plong (Cambodia)

28 September 2023
16:00 UTC+8

Japan	7–0	Vietnam
Shiokoshi 19', 24'; Chiba 51', 77'; Wakisaka 55' (pen.); Osawa 69', 90+2'	Report

Wenzhou Olympic Sports Center Stadium, Wenzhou
Attendance: 10,174
Referee: Lara Christie Lee (Australia)

Quarterfinal

30 September 2023
19:30 UTC+8

Japan	8–1	Philippines
Tanikawa 40' (pen.); Osawa 58', 90+4'; Chiba 65'; Ueno 76' (pen.), 78', 81', 90+1'	Report	Bolden 68'

Wenzhou Sports Centre, Wenzhou
Attendance: 33,607
Referee: Casey Reibelt (Australia)

Semifinal

3 October 2023
20:00 UTC+8

China	3–4	Japan
Wang Linlin 20'; Zhang Linyan 55'; Yang Lina 61'	Report	Nakashima 12'; Tanikawa 31'; Chiba 35'; Koga 43'

Linping Sports Center Stadium, Hangzhou
Attendance: 8,006
Referee: Kim Yu-jeong (South Korea)

Final

6 October 2023
20:00 UTC+8

(gold) Japan	4–1	North Korea (silver)
Nakashima 10'; Osawa 66'; Tanikawa 69'; Chiba 72'	Report	Kim Kyong-yong 38'

Huanglong Sports Centre Stadium, Hangzhou
Attendance: 37,166
Referee: Veronika Bernatskaia (Kyrgyzstan)

== Gymnastics ==
=== Artistic ===
Men
Qualification & Team Final

Athlete	Event	Apparatus						Total	Rank
Athlete	Event	F	PH	R	V	PB	HB	Total	Rank
Shohei Kawakami	Team	14.466 Q	14.000	13.100	14.100	14.533	14.233	84.432	2 Q
Takeru Kitazono	Team	13.800	13.266	13.666 Q	14.600	15.133 Q	12.766	83.231	3 Q
Kakeru Tanigawa	Team	14.033	12.166	—N/a	—N/a	14.900 Q	14.533 Q	—N/a	—N/a
Wataru Tanigawa	Team	14.133 Q	—N/a	14.433 Q	15.033 Q	14.866	14.233 Q	—N/a	—N/a
Ryota Tsumura	Team	—N/a	14.900 Q	13.400	14.600	—N/a	—N/a	—N/a	—N/a
Total	Team	42.632	42.166	41.499	44.433	44.899	42.999	258.628	2nd place, silver medalist(s)

Individual finals

Athlete	Event	Qualification								Final							
Athlete	Event	Apparatus						Total	Rank	Apparatus						Total	Rank
Athlete	Event	F	PH	R	V	PB	HB	Total	Rank	F	PH	R	V	PB	HB	Total	Rank
Shohei Kawakami	All-around	See team results								13.700	12.866	13.500	12.600	14.666	14.500	81.832	4
Shohei Kawakami	Floor	14.466	—N/a	—N/a	—N/a	—N/a	—N/a	14.466	2 Q	12.400	—N/a	—N/a	—N/a	—N/a	—N/a	12.400	8
Takeru Kitazono	All-around	See team results								14.400	14.600	13.866	14.433	15.300	14.433	87.032	2nd place, silver medalist(s)
Takeru Kitazono	Rings	—N/a	—N/a	13.666	—N/a	—N/a	—N/a	13.666	9 Q	—N/a	—N/a	14.000	—N/a	—N/a	—N/a	14.000	7
Takeru Kitazono	Parallel bars	—N/a	—N/a	—N/a	—N/a	15.133	—N/a	15.133	3 Q	—N/a	—N/a	—N/a	—N/a	15.233	—N/a	15.233	2nd place, silver medalist(s)
Kakeru Tanigawa	Parallel bars	—N/a	—N/a	—N/a	—N/a	14.900	—N/a	14.900	4 Q	—N/a	—N/a	—N/a	—N/a	15.066	—N/a	15.066	3rd place, bronze medalist(s)
Kakeru Tanigawa	Horizontal bar	—N/a	—N/a	—N/a	—N/a	—N/a	14.533	14.533	1 Q	—N/a	—N/a	—N/a	—N/a	—N/a	14.633	14.633	3rd place, bronze medalist(s)
Wataru Tanigawa	Floor	14.133	—N/a	—N/a	—N/a	—N/a	—N/a	14.133	5 Q	13.200	—N/a	—N/a	—N/a	—N/a	—N/a	13.200	7
Wataru Tanigawa	Rings	—N/a	—N/a	14.433	—N/a	—N/a	—N/a	14.433	6 Q	—N/a	—N/a	14.300	—N/a	—N/a	—N/a	14.300	3rd place, bronze medalist(s)
Wataru Tanigawa	Vault	—N/a	—N/a	—N/a	15.233; 14.833	—N/a	—N/a	15.033	6 Q	—N/a	—N/a	—N/a	15.266; 14.766	—N/a	—N/a	15.016	1st place, gold medalist(s)
Wataru Tanigawa	Horizontal bar	—N/a	—N/a	—N/a	—N/a	—N/a	14.233	14.233	5 Q	—N/a	—N/a	—N/a	—N/a	—N/a	14.366	14.366	4
Ryota Tsumura	Pommel horse	—N/a	14.900	—N/a	—N/a	—N/a	—N/a	14.900	3 Q	—N/a	15.166	—N/a	—N/a	—N/a	—N/a	15.166	2nd place, silver medalist(s)

Women
Qualification & Team Final

Athlete	Event	Apparatus				Total	Rank
Athlete	Event	VT	UB	BB	FX	Total	Rank
Misaki Masui	Team	13.133	12.100	13.266 Q	12.700 A	51.199	9
Mana Okamura	Team	13.000	12.933 Q	13.366 Q	13.133 Q	52.432	4 Q
Mikako Serita	Team	12.966	13.533 Q	12.100	10.966	49.565	11
Kohane Ushioku	Team	13.633 Q	12.833	12.433	13.266 Q	52.165	8 Q
Total	Team	39.766	39.299	39.065	39.099	157.299	2nd place, silver medalist(s)

Individual finals

Athlete	Event	Qualification						Final					
Athlete	Event	Apparatus				Total	Rank	Apparatus				Total	Rank
Athlete	Event	VT	UB	BB	FX	Total	Rank	VT	UB	BB	FX	Total	Rank
Misaki Masui	Balance beam	—N/a	—N/a	13.266	—N/a	13.266	4 Q	—N/a	—N/a	12.366	—N/a	12.366	7
Misaki Masui	Vault	13.133; 11.800	—N/a	—N/a	—N/a	12.466	12	Did not advance					
Misaki Masui	Floor	—N/a	—N/a	—N/a	12.700	12.700	11 A	—N/a	—N/a	—N/a	12.633	12.633	5
Mana Okamura	All-around	See team results						12.866	13.033	13.933	13.066	52.898	2nd place, silver medalist(s)
Mana Okamura	Uneven bars	—N/a	12.933	—N/a	—N/a	12.933	8 Q	—N/a	11.200	—N/a	—N/a	11.200	8
Mana Okamura	Balance beam	—N/a	—N/a	13.366	—N/a	13.366	3 Q	—N/a	—N/a	13.966	—N/a	13.966	1st place, gold medalist(s)
Mana Okamura	Floor	—N/a	—N/a	—N/a	13.133	13.133	4 Q	—N/a	—N/a	—N/a	12.700	12.700	4
Mikako Serita	Uneven bars	—N/a	13.533	—N/a	—N/a	13.533	5 Q	—N/a	13.933	—N/a	—N/a	13.933	2nd place, silver medalist(s)
Kohane Ushioku	All-around	See team results						Did not start					
Kohane Ushioku	Vault	13.633; 13.266	—N/a	—N/a	—N/a	13.449	3 Q	wd	—N/a	—N/a	—N/a	withdrew	
Kohane Ushioku	Floor	—N/a	—N/a	—N/a	13.266	13.266	1 Q	—N/a	—N/a	—N/a	withdrew		

== Handball ==
Summary

Key:

- ET – After extra time
- P – Match decided by penalty-shootout.

Team	Event	Preliminary round	Standing	Main round	Standing	Semifinals	Final/Bronze medal match	
Team	Event	Opposition score	Standing	Opposition score	Standing	Opposition score	Opposition score	Rank
Japan men's	Men's tournament	Group B Saudi Arabia: W 38–29; Iran: W 33–21; Mongolia: W 53–16	1 Q	Group I China: W 28–23; Kazakhstan: W 48–20; Qatar: L 29–32	2 Q	Bahrain; L 28–30	Kuwait; L 30–31	4
Japan women's	Women's tournament	Group B Hong Kong: W 38–10; India: W 41–13; Nepal: W 62–10; China: W 26–25	1 Q	—N/a		Kazakhstan; W 40–22	South Korea; W 29–19	1st place, gold medalist(s)

=== Men's tournament ===
Group D

Pos	Team	Pld	W	D	L	GF	GA	GD	Pts	Qualification
1	Japan	3	3	0	0	124	66	+58	6	Main round
2	Iran	3	1	1	1	94	72	+22	3 (Note: Head-to-head result: IRI 23–23 KSA. Overall goal difference was used as the tiebreaker.)	Main round
3	Saudi Arabia	3	1	1	1	97	76	+21	3	
4	Mongolia	3	0	0	3	47	148	−101	0	

Source: AHF
Notes:

24 September; 16:00	Japan	38–29	Saudi Arabia	ZJSU Sports Centre, Hangzhou; Referees: Lee, Koo (KOR)
24 September; 16:00	Sugioka 7	(20–14)	A. Al-Abbas 5	ZJSU Sports Centre, Hangzhou; Referees: Lee, Koo (KOR)
24 September; 16:00	4× (suspension)		1× (yellow card) 3× (suspension)	ZJSU Sports Centre, Hangzhou; Referees: Lee, Koo (KOR)

25 September; 18:00	Japan	33–21	Iran	ZJSU Sports Centre, Hangzhou; Referees: Shakir, Kadhim (IRQ)
25 September; 18:00	Sugioka 8	(13–8)	Heidarpour 5	ZJSU Sports Centre, Hangzhou; Referees: Shakir, Kadhim (IRQ)
25 September; 18:00	1× (yellow card) 4× (suspension)		1× (yellow card) 3× (suspension)	ZJSU Sports Centre, Hangzhou; Referees: Shakir, Kadhim (IRQ)

27 September; 11:00	Mongolia	16–53	Japan	ZJNU Xiaoshan Gymnasium, Hangzhou; Referees: Ghofli, Hassanzadeh (IRI)
27 September; 11:00	Lkhagvatsend 9	(11–28)	Agarie, Izumoto 11	ZJNU Xiaoshan Gymnasium, Hangzhou; Referees: Ghofli, Hassanzadeh (IRI)
27 September; 11:00	6× (suspension)		1× (suspension)	ZJNU Xiaoshan Gymnasium, Hangzhou; Referees: Ghofli, Hassanzadeh (IRI)

Main round (Group II)

Pos	Team	Pld	W	D	L	GF	GA	GD	Pts	Qualification
1	Qatar	3	3	0	0	115	62	+53	6	Semifinals
2	Japan	3	2	0	1	105	75	+30	4	Semifinals
3	China	3	1	0	2	83	82	+1	2	
4	Kazakhstan	3	0	0	3	50	134	−84	0	

Source: AHF

29 September; 14:00	Japan	28–23	China	ZJSU Sports Centre, Hangzhou; Referees: Al-Mawt, Al-Marhoon (BHR)
29 September; 14:00	Motoki 8	(12–12)	Zhu 8	ZJSU Sports Centre, Hangzhou; Referees: Al-Mawt, Al-Marhoon (BHR)
29 September; 14:00	1× (yellow card) 4× (suspension)		3× (yellow card) 2× (suspension) 1× (red card)	ZJSU Sports Centre, Hangzhou; Referees: Al-Mawt, Al-Marhoon (BHR)

30 September; 12:00	Japan	48–20	Kazakhstan	ZJSU Sports Centre, Hangzhou; Referees: Al-Enezi, Al-Naseem (KUW)
30 September; 12:00	Kani 13	(26–12)	Milyayev, Kali 4	ZJSU Sports Centre, Hangzhou; Referees: Al-Enezi, Al-Naseem (KUW)
30 September; 12:00	1× (yellow card) 1× (suspension)		3× (suspension)	ZJSU Sports Centre, Hangzhou; Referees: Al-Enezi, Al-Naseem (KUW)

1 October; 16:00	Qatar	32–29	Japan	ZJSU Sports Centre, Hangzhou; Referees: Cheng, Zhou (CHN)
1 October; 16:00	Carol 11	(16–15)	Motoki 6	ZJSU Sports Centre, Hangzhou; Referees: Cheng, Zhou (CHN)
1 October; 16:00	1× (yellow card) 3× (suspension)			ZJSU Sports Centre, Hangzhou; Referees: Cheng, Zhou (CHN)

Semifinal

3 October; 16:00	Bahrain	30–28	Japan	ZJSU Sports Centre, Hangzhou; Referees: Ismoilov, Ismoilov (UZB)
3 October; 16:00	Al-Sayyad 9	(17–13)	Izumoto 6	ZJSU Sports Centre, Hangzhou; Referees: Ismoilov, Ismoilov (UZB)
3 October; 16:00	5× (suspension)		3× (suspension)	ZJSU Sports Centre, Hangzhou; Referees: Ismoilov, Ismoilov (UZB)

Bronze medal game

5 October; 15:00	Japan	30–31	Kuwait	ZJSU Sports Centre, Hangzhou; Referees: Cheng, Zhou (CHN)
5 October; 15:00	Yoshino 9	(14–14)	Abdula. Al-Shammari 7	ZJSU Sports Centre, Hangzhou; Referees: Cheng, Zhou (CHN)
5 October; 15:00	1× (yellow card) 3× (suspension)		1× (yellow card) 4× (suspension)	ZJSU Sports Centre, Hangzhou; Referees: Cheng, Zhou (CHN)

=== Women's tournament ===
Group B

Pos	Team	Pld	W	D	L	GF	GA	GD	Pts	Qualification
1	Japan	4	4	0	0	167	58	+109	8	Semifinals
2	China	4	3	0	1	154	81	+73	6	Semifinals
3	India	4	1	1	2	113	123	−10	3 (Note: Head-to-head result: IND 26–26 HKG. Overall goal difference was used as the tiebreaker.)	
4	Hong Kong	4	1	1	2	78	117	−39	3	
5	Nepal	4	0	0	4	57	190	−133	0	

Source: AHF
Notes:

24 September; 14:00	Hong Kong	10–38	Japan	ZJNU Xiaoshan Gymnasium, Hangzhou; Referees: Lee, Lee (KOR)
24 September; 14:00	Lee 3	(5–18)	Hattori 8	ZJNU Xiaoshan Gymnasium, Hangzhou; Referees: Lee, Lee (KOR)
24 September; 14:00	2× (suspension)		4× (suspension)	ZJNU Xiaoshan Gymnasium, Hangzhou; Referees: Lee, Lee (KOR)

25 September; 14:00	India	13–41	Japan	ZJNU Xiaoshan Gymnasium, Hangzhou; Referees: Ismoilov, Ismoilov (UZB)
25 September; 14:00	M. Thakur 4	(4–21)	Ishikawa 7	ZJNU Xiaoshan Gymnasium, Hangzhou; Referees: Ismoilov, Ismoilov (UZB)
25 September; 14:00	3× (suspension)		1× (suspension)	ZJNU Xiaoshan Gymnasium, Hangzhou; Referees: Ismoilov, Ismoilov (UZB)

27 September; 13:00	Japan	62–10	Nepal	ZJNU Xiaoshan Gymnasium, Hangzhou; Referees: Al-Wahibi, Al-Shahi (OMA)
27 September; 13:00	Hattori 12	(37–6)	Sherpa 4	ZJNU Xiaoshan Gymnasium, Hangzhou; Referees: Al-Wahibi, Al-Shahi (OMA)
27 September; 13:00	1× (suspension)		2× (suspension)	ZJNU Xiaoshan Gymnasium, Hangzhou; Referees: Al-Wahibi, Al-Shahi (OMA)

30 September; 18:00	China	25–26	Japan	ZJNU Xiaoshan Gymnasium, Hangzhou; Referees: Al-Mawt, Al-Marhoon (BHR)
30 September; 18:00	Li X. 6	(11–8)	Kasai 8	ZJNU Xiaoshan Gymnasium, Hangzhou; Referees: Al-Mawt, Al-Marhoon (BHR)
30 September; 18:00	4× (suspension)		1× (suspension)	ZJNU Xiaoshan Gymnasium, Hangzhou; Referees: Al-Mawt, Al-Marhoon (BHR)

Semifinal

3 October; 14:00	Japan	40–22	Kazakhstan	ZJSU Sports Centre, Hangzhou; Referees: Liu, Xu (CHN)
3 October; 14:00	Aizawa 6	(20–11)	Rejemetova 5	ZJSU Sports Centre, Hangzhou; Referees: Liu, Xu (CHN)
3 October; 14:00			2× (suspension)	ZJSU Sports Centre, Hangzhou; Referees: Liu, Xu (CHN)

Gold medal game

5 October; 17:00	South Korea	19–29	Japan	ZJSU Sports Centre, Hangzhou; Referees: Al-Marhoon, Al-Mawt (BHR)
5 October; 17:00	Ryu, Gim 3	(8–14)	Aizawa 6	ZJSU Sports Centre, Hangzhou; Referees: Al-Marhoon, Al-Mawt (BHR)
5 October; 17:00	3× (suspension)		4× (suspension)	ZJSU Sports Centre, Hangzhou; Referees: Al-Marhoon, Al-Mawt (BHR)

== Judo ==
Athlete	Event	Round of 32	Round of 16	Quarterfinals	Semifinals	Repechage	Final / BM	
Athlete	Event	Opposition Result	Opposition Result	Opposition Result	Opposition Result	Opposition Result	Opposition Result	Rank
Hayato Kondo	Men's 60 kg	Bye	Al-Ali (KUW); W 10-01	Yang (TPE); L 00-10	Did not advance	Sufiev (TJK); L 00-10	Did not advance	
Ryoma Tanaka	Men's 66 kg	Bye	Nakano (PHI); W 10-00	Bayanmönkhiin (UAE); W 10-00	An (KOR); W 10-00	Bye	Yondonperenlein (MGL); W 01-00	1st place, gold medalist(s)
Soichi Hashimoto	Men's 73 kg	Bye	Terada (THA); W 10-00	Sagynaliev (KGZ); W 10-00	Khojazoda (TJK); W 01-00	Bye	Yuldoshev (UZB); L 00-01	2nd place, silver medalist(s)
Yuhei Oino	Men's 81 kg	Bye	Tatalashvili (UAE); W 10-00	Gereltuya (MGL); W 10-00	Lee (KOR); L 00-10	Bye	Gerbekov (BHR); W 10-00	3rd place, bronze medalist(s)
Goki Tajima	Men's 90 kg	Açyldyýew (TKM); W 10-00	Han (KOR); L 01-11	Did not advance				
Aaron Wolf	Men's 100 kg	—N/a	Zoloev (KGZ); W 10-00	Sharkhan (KAZ); L 00-10	Did not advance	Madjanow (TKM); W 10-00	Kostoev (UAE); L 00-01	5
Hyōga Ōta	Men's +100 kg	—N/a	Wardana (INA); W 10-00	Kim (KOR); L 00-10	Did not advance	Li (CHN); W 10-00	Yusupov (UZB); L 00-01	5
Natsumi Tsunoda	Women's 48 kg	—N/a	Bye	Wong (HKG); W 10-00	Guo (CHN); W 10-00	Bye	Abuzhakynova (KAZ); W 11-00	1st place, gold medalist(s)
Ai Shishime	Women's 52 kg	—N/a	Lin (TPE); W 10-00	Jung (KOR); L 00-10	Did not advance	Maharani (INA); L 00-10	Did not advance	
Momo Tamaoki	Women's 57 kg	—N/a	Furukawa (PHI); W 10-00	Aminova (UZB); W 10-00	Park (KOR); W 10-00	Bye	Lien (TPE); L 00-01	2nd place, silver medalist(s)
Miku Takaichi	Women's 63 kg	—N/a	Bye	Watanabe (PHI); W 10-00	Kim (KOR); W 10-01	Bye	Tang (CHN); W 10-00	1st place, gold medalist(s)
Shiho Tanaka	Women's 70 kg	—N/a	Bye	Salinas (PHI); W 10-00	Feng (CHN); W 01-00	Bye	Mun (PRK); W 10-00	1st place, gold medalist(s)
Rika Takayama	Women's 78 kg	—N/a	Bye	Hsu Wang (TPE); W 10-00	Yoon (KOR); W 11-00	Bye	Ma (CHN); L 00-10	2nd place, silver medalist(s)
Wakaba Tomita	Women's +78 kg	—N/a	Bye	Maan (IND); W 10-00	Xu (CHN); L 01-10	Bye	Berlikash (KAZ); W 10-00	3rd place, bronze medalist(s)
Moka Kuwagata; Ruri Takahashi; Momo Tamaoki; Shiho Tanaka; Wakaba Tomita; Natsumi Tsunoda; Yuhei Oino; Hyoga Ota; Ken Oyoshi; Goki Tajima; Ryoma Tanaka; Aaron Wolf	Mixed team	—N/a	Bye	Nepal (NEP); W 4–0	South Korea (KOR); W 4–0	Bye	Uzbekistan (UZB); W 4–0	1st place, gold medalist(s)

== Sport climbing ==
Speed

Athlete	Event	Qualification		Round of 16	Quarter-finals	Semi-finals	Final / BM	
Athlete	Event	Best	Rank	Opposition Time	Opposition Time	Opposition Time	Opposition Time	Rank
Ryo Omasa	Men's	5.355	7 Q	Limpanichpakdee (THA); W 5.325–6.243	Wu (CHN); L 5.161–5.018	Did not advance		
Karin Hayashi	Women's	7.764	7 Q	Raksachat (THA); W 7.654–9.267	Deng (CHN); L 7.779–6.737	Did not advance		

Combined

Athlete	Event	Qualification				Semi-finals				Final			
Athlete	Event	Boulder Point	Lead Point	Total	Rank	Boulder Point	Lead Point	Total	Rank	Boulder Point	Lead Point	Total	Rank
Sorato Anraku	Men's	99.9	100	199.9	2 Q	84.7	100	184.7	1 Q	99.7	88.1	187.8	1st place, gold medalist(s)
Meichi Narasaki	Men's	100	84.1	184.1	4 Q	79.4	54	133.4	3 Q	74.4	9	83.4	5
Anon Matsufuji	Women's	84.8	28.1	112.9	5 Q	59.86	64.1	123.96	4	Cancelled (Note: The women's boulder and lead final has been cancelled due to rain and safety of the athletes. The semi-finals result would be used as final result.)			
Ai Mori	Women's	99.9	96.1	196.0	1 Q	99.73	100	199.73	1st place, gold medalist(s)	Cancelled			

== Swimming ==
=== Men ===
Athlete	Event	Heat		Final	
Athlete	Event	Time	Rank	Time	Rank
Tomonobu Gomi	100 m freestyle	49.50	4	Did not advance	
Yuya Hinomoto	50 m breaststroke	27.39	1 Q	27.61	4
Tomoru Honda	400 m individual medley	4:16.60	1 Q	4:11.40	1st place, gold medalist(s)
Tomoru Honda	200 m butterfly	1:53.30	1 Q	1:53.15	1st place, gold medalist(s)
Ikki Imoto	1500 m freestyle	—N/a		15:14.27	6
Ikki Imoto	400 m freestyle	3:53.62	3 Q	3:50.09	5
Ryosuke Irie	100 m backstroke	54.11	1 Q	53.46	2nd place, silver medalist(s)
Ryosuke Irie	50 m backstroke	25.35	1 Q	25.15	3rd place, bronze medalist(s)
Takeshi Kawamoto	50 m backstroke	25.18	2 Q	25.36	5
Takeshi Kawamoto	50 m butterfly	23.94	2 Q	23.54	5
Hidenari Mano	200 m freestyle	1:47.79	2 Q	1:46.15	4
Katsuhiro Matsumoto	100 m freestyle	48.66	1 Q	48.72	5
Katsuhiro Matsumoto	100 m butterfly	51.88	1 Q	51.13	1st place, gold medalist(s)
Katsuhiro Matsumoto	200 m freestyle	1:48.44	2 Q	1:48.95	6
Naoki Mizunuma	100 m butterfly	52.77	2 Q	51.97	4
Naoki Mizunuma	50 m butterfly	24.01	2	Did not advance	
Teppei Morimoto	200 m butterfly	1:58.51	2 Q	1:59.01	7
Katsumi Nakamura	50 m freestyle	22.52	1 Q	22.20	5
So Ogata	200 m individual medley	2:00.95	1 Q	1:59.69	4
Shoma Sato	100 m breaststroke	1:02.00	2	Did not advance	
Shoma Sato	200 m breaststroke	2:13.16	2 Q	2:14.06	8
Daiya Seto	200 m individual medley	1:59.55	1 Q	1:58.35	3rd place, bronze medalist(s)
Daiya Seto	400 m individual medley	4:19.69	1 Q	4:12.88	2nd place, silver medalist(s)
Shinri Shioura	50 m freestyle	22.30	2 Q	22.35	8
Kaito Tabuchi	800 m freestyle	—N/a		8:02.00	6
Kaito Tabuchi	400 m freestyle	3:52.28	3 Q	3:50.63	7
Shogo Takeda	1500 m freestyle	—N/a		15:03.29	3rd place, bronze medalist(s)
Shogo Takeda	800 m freestyle	—N/a		7:54.49	5
Hidekazu Takehara	200 m backstroke	1:59.78	1 Q	1:57.63	3rd place, bronze medalist(s)
Ippei Watanabe	100 m breaststroke	1:01.48	1 Q	1:01.36	5
Ippei Watanabe	200 m breaststroke	2:12.70	2	2:09.91	3rd place, bronze medalist(s)
Ippei Watanabe	50 m breaststroke	28.05	2 Q	28.23	6
Daiki Yanagawa	100 m backstroke	55.01	2 Q	54.44	5
Daiki Yanagawa	200 m backstroke	2:01.31	2 Q	1:58.37	4
Tomonobu Gomi; Katsuhiro Matsumoto; Katsumi Nakamura; Taikan Tanaka; *Shinri Shioura	4 x 100 m freestyle	3:18.32	2 Q	3:14.26	3rd place, bronze medalist(s)
Hidenari Mano; Taikan Tanaka; Tomoru Honda; Katsuhiro Matsumoto; *So Ogata	4 x 200 m freestyle	7:13.38	2 Q	7:06.29	3rd place, bronze medalist(s)
Ryosuke Irie; Yuya Hinomoto; Katsuhiro Matsumoto; Katsumi Nakamura; *Daiki Yanagawa; *Naoki Mizunuma	4 x 100 m medley relay	3:37.03	1 Q	3:32.52	3rd place, bronze medalist(s)

=== Women ===
Athlete	Event	Heat		Final	
Athlete	Event	Time	Rank	Time	Rank
Reona Aoki	50 m breaststroke	30.95	1 Q	31.05	6
Reona Aoki	100 m breaststroke	1:07.51	2 Q	1:06.81	1st place, gold medalist(s)
Reona Aoki	200 m breaststroke	2:30.65	1 Q	2:28.07	6
Chihiro Igarashi	50 m freestyle	25.65	5	Did not advance	
Rikako Ikee	100 m freestyle	Did not start		Did not advance	
Rikako Ikee	100 m butterfly	1:00.34	2 Q	58.98	5
Rikako Ikee	50 m freestyle	25.68	3	Did not advance	
Rikako Ikee	50 m butterfly	26.22	1 Q	26.02	3rd place, bronze medalist(s)
Nagisa Ikemoto	200 m freestyle	2:00.36	2 Q	1:59.32	5
Nagisa Ikemoto	100 m freestyle	55.02	2 Q	54.27	4
Runa Imai	200 m breaststroke	2:30.18	2 Q	2:26.41	3rd place, bronze medalist(s)
Waka Kobori	400 m freestyle	4:10.27	2 Q	4:07.81	3rd place, bronze medalist(s)
Waka Kobori	800 m freestyle	—N/a		8:28.78	2nd place, silver medalist(s)
Hiroko Makino	200 m butterfly	2:12.94	3 Q	2:09.22	3rd place, bronze medalist(s)
Airi Mitsui	200 m butterfly	2:11.31	2 Q	2:11.30	7
Yukimi Moriyama	1500 m freestyle	—N/a		16:17.78	3rd place, bronze medalist(s)
Miyu Namba	1500 m freestyle	—N/a		16:41.80	6
Miyu Namba	400 m freestyle	4:13.79	3 Q	4:09.48	4
Miyu Namba	800 m freestyle	—N/a		8:39.34	5
Mio Narita	200 m individual medley	2:13.93	1 Q	2:10.76	4
Mio Narita	200 m backstroke	2:11.62	2 Q	2:10.72	4
Mio Narita	400 m individual medley	4:47.53	1 Q	4:38.77	3rd place, bronze medalist(s)
Yui Ohashi	200 m individual medley	2:15.66	2 Q	2:15.01	6
Rio Shirai	200 m freestyle	2:01.63	2 Q	2:00.76	6
Rio Shirai	200 m backstroke	2:14.17	2 Q	2:14.39	8
Rio Shirai	100 m backstroke	1:01.58	1 Q	1:01.36	6
Ai Soma	50 m backstroke	29.50	3	Did not advance	
Ai Soma	100 m butterfly	57.92	2 Q	57.57	2nd place, silver medalist(s)
Ai Soma	50 m butterfly	26.28	1 Q	26.07	4
Satomi Suzuki	50 m breaststroke	30.53	2 Q	30.14	2nd place, silver medalist(s)
Satomi Suzuki	100 m breaststroke	1:06.49	1 Q	1:06.95	2nd place, silver medalist(s)
Miki Takahashi	50 m backstroke	28.24	2 Q	28.21	3rd place, bronze medalist(s)
Miki Takahashi	100 m backstroke	1:01.29	1 Q	1:01.01	5
Ageha Tanigawa	400 m individual medley	4:44.91	2 Q	4:35.65	2nd place, silver medalist(s)
Nagisa Ikemoto; Rio Shirai; Rikako Ikee; Chihiro Igarashi	4 x 100 m freestyle relay	3:40.89	2 Q	3:38.48	2nd place, silver medalist(s)
Nagisa Ikemoto; Waka Kobori; Miyu Namba; Rio Shirai; *Hiroko Makino; Mio Narita	4 x 200 m freestyle relay	8:04.37	1 Q	7:55.93	2nd place, silver medalist(s)
Reona Aoki; Nagisa Ikemoto; Ai Soma; Miki Takahashi; *Hiroko Makino	4 x 100 m medley relay	4:02.33	1 Q	3:57.67	1st place, gold medalist(s)

=== Mixed ===
Athlete	Event	Heat		Final	
Athlete	Event	Time	Rank	Time	Rank
Ryosuke Irie; Yuya Hinomoto; Ai Soma; Nagisa Ikemoto; *Hidekazu Takehara; *Ippei Watanabe; *Hiroko Makino	4 x 100 m medley relay	3:47.94	2 Q	3:44.64	2nd place, silver medalist(s)

== Wushu ==
=== Taolu ===
Athlete	Event	Event 1		Event 2		Total	Rank
Athlete	Event	Result	Rank	Result	Rank	Total	Rank
Motoyoshi Araki	Men's changquan	9.730	4	—N/a		9.730	4
Tomohiro Araya	Men's taijiquan and taijijian	9.730	9	9.730	5	19.460	5
Maho Imai	Men's daoshu and gunshu	9.263	11	8.920	11	18.183	11
Kana Ikeuchi	Women's changquan	8.990	9	—N/a		8.990	9
Shiho Saito	Women's taijiquan and taijijian	9.730	5	9.710	7	19.440	6
Nanoha Kida	Women's jianshu and qiangshu	9.433	10	9.700	5	19.133	8
