= Gymnastics at the 2022 Asian Games – Women's vault =

Women's vault at the 2022 Asian Games
- Venue: Huanglong Gymnasium
- Date: 25–28 September 2023
- Competitors: 21 from 11 nations

Medalists
gold medal	An Chang-ok	North Korea
silver medal	Kim Son-hyang	North Korea
bronze medal	Yu Linmin	China

The women's vault competition at the 2022 Asian Games took place on 25 and 28 September 2023 at Huanglong Sports Centre Gymnasium.

== Schedule ==
All times are China Standard Time (UTC+08:00)

Date	Time	Event
Monday, 25 September 2023	10:00	Qualification
Thursday, 28 September 2023	15:06	Final

== Results ==
Legend

- DNF — Did not finish
- DNS — Did not start

=== Qualification ===
Rank	Athlete	Vault 1	Vault 2	Total
1	An Chang-ok (PRK)	13.866	13.800	13.833
2	Kim Son-hyang (PRK)	13.433	13.733	13.583
3	Kohane Ushioku (JPN)	13.633	13.266	13.449
4	Yu Linmin (CHN)	14.033	12.733	13.383
5	Oksana Chusovitina (UZB)	12.866	13.033	12.949
6	Pranati Nayak (IND)	12.866	12.566	12.716
7	Darya Yassinskaya (KAZ)	12.833	12.433	12.633
8	Charlie Manzano (PHI)	12.800	12.366	12.583
9	Wu Sing-fen (TPE)	13.000	12.100	12.550
10	Aida Bauyrzhanova (KAZ)	12.366	12.633	12.499
11	Nadine Joy Nathan (SGP)	12.700	12.266	12.483
12	Misaki Masui (JPN)	13.133	11.800	12.466
13	Lai Pin-ju (TPE)	12.800	12.133	12.466
14	Lim Su-min (KOR)	12.666	12.000	12.333
15	Lin Yi-chen (TPE)	12.666	11.933	12.299
16	Anfissa Ivanova (KAZ)	12.400	12.133	12.266
17	Amina Khalimarden (KAZ)	12.133	12.133	12.133
18	Sasiwimon Mueangphuan (THA)	11.866	11.766	11.816
19	Thantida Ruecker (THA)	11.433	11.566	11.499
20	Ananya Patanakul (THA)	12.366	10.300	11.333
—	Kaitlyn Lim (SGP)	12.333	DNS	DNF

=== Final ===
Rank	Athlete	Vault 1	Vault 2	Total
1st place, gold medalist(s)	An Chang-ok (PRK)	13.933	14.166	14.049
2nd place, silver medalist(s)	Kim Son-hyang (PRK)	13.500	13.700	13.600
3rd place, bronze medalist(s)	Yu Linmin (CHN)	14.000	13.066	13.533
4	Oksana Chusovitina (UZB)	13.533	13.233	13.383
5	Wu Sing-fen (TPE)	13.133	12.100	12.616
6	Darya Yassinskaya (KAZ)	12.333	12.900	12.616
7	Charlie Manzano (PHI)	12.166	12.566	12.366
8	Pranati Nayak (IND)	12.100	12.600	12.350
