= Skateboarding at the 2022 Asian Games – Men's park =

Men's park at the 2022 Asian Games
- Venue: Qiantang Roller Sports Centre
- Date: 24–25 September 2023
- Competitors: 11 from 7 nations

Medalists
gold medal	Chen Ye	China
silver medal	Yuro Nagahara	Japan
bronze medal	Kensuke Sasaoka	Japan

The men's park competition at the 2022 Asian Games took place on 24 and 25 September 2023 at Qiantang Roller Sports Centre.

== Schedule ==
All times are China Standard Time (UTC+08:00)

Date	Time	Event
Sunday, 24 September 2023	14:30	Qualification
Monday, 25 September 2023	12:30	Final

== Results ==
=== Qualification ===
Rank	Athlete	Run 1	Run 2	Best
1	Yuro Nagahara (JPN)	45.13	81.80	81.80
2	Kensuke Sasaoka (JPN)	43.13	79.81	79.81
3	Kiko Francisco (PHI)	2.06	77.86	77.86
4	Chen Ye (CHN)	76.78	56.10	76.78
5	Han Jae-jin (KOR)	57.06	51.10	57.06
6	Moon Gang-ho (KOR)	54.23	25.18	54.23
7	Li Mingxiao (CHN)	44.71	52.11	52.11
8	Brian Upapong (THA)	20.00	47.76	47.76
9	Lin Bo-yu (TPE)	15.03	43.68	43.68
10	Noppakorn Panutai (THA)	38.41	39.25	39.25
11	Yu Long (HKG)	32.28	30.94	32.28

=== Final ===
Rank	Athlete	Run 1	Run 2	Run 3	Best
1st place, gold medalist(s)	Chen Ye (CHN)	82.82	84.41	80.62	84.41
2nd place, silver medalist(s)	Yuro Nagahara (JPN)	75.99	76.01	84.00	84.00
3rd place, bronze medalist(s)	Kensuke Sasaoka (JPN)	53.52	80.90	83.66	83.66
4	Kiko Francisco (PHI)	28.26	83.58	9.35	83.58
5	Han Jae-jin (KOR)	67.22	68.33	8.50	68.33
6	Li Mingxiao (CHN)	63.74	5.74	54.59	63.74
7	Brian Upapong (THA)	44.00	13.34	28.06	44.00
8	Moon Gang-ho (KOR)	26.13	41.42	41.14	41.42
