= Swimming at the 2022 Asian Games – Women's 100 metre breaststroke =

Women's 100 metre breaststroke at the 2022 Asian Games
- Venue: Hangzhou Olympic Expo Aquatics Center
- Date: 27 September 2023
- Competitors: 23 from 17 nations

Medalists
| gold medal | Reona Aoki | Japan |
| silver medal | Satomi Suzuki | Japan |
| bronze medal | Yang Chang | China |

The Women's 100 metre breaststroke event at the 2022 Asian Games took place on 27 September 2023 at the Hangzhou Olympic Expo Center.

== Schedule ==
All times are China Standard Time (UTC+08:00)

| Date | Time | Event |
|---|---|---|
| Wednesday, 27 September 2023 | 11:04 | Heats |
| Wednesday, 27 September 2023 | 20:13 | Final |

== Records ==
Prior to this competition, the existing world, Asian and Games records were as follows.

| World Record | Lilly King (USA) | 1:04.13 | Fukuoka, Japan | 25 July 2017 |
| Asian Record | Reona Aoki (JPN) | 1:05.19 | Tokyo, Japan | 2 March 2022 |
| Games Record | Satomi Suzuki (JPN) | 1:06.40 | Jakarta, Indonesia | 19 August 2018 |

== Results ==
=== Heats ===
| Rank | Heat | Athlete | Time | Notes |
|---|---|---|---|---|
| 1 | 2 | Satomi Suzuki (JPN) | 1:06.46 | |
| 2 | 3 | Letitia Sim (SGP) | 1:07.27 | |
| 3 | 3 | Reona Aoki (JPN) | 1:07.51 | |
| 4 | 1 | Yang Chang (CHN) | 1:07.66 | |
| 5 | 2 | Ko Ha-ru (KOR) | 1:08.82 | |
| 5 | 1 | Kim Hye-jin (KOR) | 1:08.82 | |
| 7 | 2 | Zhu Leiju (CHN) | 1:09.32 | |
| 8 | 3 | Phee Jinq En (MAS) | 1:09.74 | |
| 9 | 1 | Lin Pei-wun (TPE) | 1:10.00 | |
| 10 | 1 | Lam Hoi Kiu (HKG) | 1:10.22 | |
| 11 | 3 | Chen Pui Lam (MAC) | 1:11.11 | |
| 12 | 3 | Adelaida Pchelintseva (KAZ) | 1:11.54 | |
| 13 | 1 | Phurichaya Junyamitree (THA) | 1:11.67 | |
| 14 | 2 | Chang Yujuan (HKG) | 1:11.78 | |
| 15 | 2 | Thanya Dela Cruz (PHI) | 1:12.04 | |
| 16 | 2 | Christie Chue (SGP) | 1:12.29 | |
| 17 | 3 | Phiangkhwan Pawapotako (THA) | 1:12.42 | |
| 18 | 1 | Lineysha A. K. (IND) | 1:15.60 | |
| 19 | 3 | Sok Vorleak (CAM) | 1:15.74 | |
| 20 | 2 | Marina Abu Shamaleh (PLE) | 1:16.63 | |
| 21 | 1 | Duana Lama (NEP) | 1:20.15 | |
| 22 | 3 | Altangereliin Myadagmaa (MGL) | 1:25.40 | |
| 23 | 2 | Een Abbas Shareef (MDV) | 1:36.57 | |

=== Final ===
| Rank | Athlete | Time | Notes |
|---|---|---|---|
| 1st place, gold medalist(s) | Reona Aoki (JPN) | 1:06.81 | |
| 2nd place, silver medalist(s) | Satomi Suzuki (JPN) | 1:06.95 | |
| 3rd place, bronze medalist(s) | Yang Chang (CHN) | 1:07.01 | |
| 4 | Letitia Sim (SGP) | 1:07.13 | |
| 5 | Ko Ha-ru (KOR) | 1:08.36 | |
| 6 | Kim Hye-jin (KOR) | 1:08.87 | |
| 7 | Zhu Leiju (CHN) | 1:09.11 | |
| 8 | Phee Jinq En (MAS) | 1:10.40 | |
