= Chihiro Ishida =

Japanese footballer (born 2001)

Personal information
- Date of birth: 20 December 2001 (age 24)
- Place of birth: Machida, Japan
- Height: 1.64 m (5 ft 5 in)
- Position: Midfielder

Team information
- Current team: Nojima Stella Kanagawa Sagamihara
- Number: 19

Senior career*
Years	Team	Apps	(Gls)
- Nojima Stella Kanagawa Sagamihara
- * Club domestic league appearances and goals

Chihiro Ishida (born 20 December 2001) is a Japanese professional footballer who plays as a midfielder for WE League club Nojima Stella Kanagawa Sagamihara.

== Club career ==
Ishida made her WE League debut on 12 September 2021.
