= Sora Hirooka =

Japanese soft tennis player

Personal information
- Native name: 広岡 宙
- Nationality: Japanese
- Born: 2 June 1999 (age 27) Hyogo Prefecture, Japan
- Employer: NTT West

Sport
- Sport: Soft tennis
- Position: Front player
Medal record
Representing Japan
Asian Games
Gold medal – first place	2022 Hangzhou	Men's team
Gold medal – first place	2026 Aichi-Nagoya	Men's team
Asian Soft Tennis Championships
Gold medal – first place	2025 Mungyeong	Men's team

Sora Hirooka (Japanese: 広岡 宙, born 2 June 1999) is a Japanese soft tennis player. A right-handed front player, he represents Japan in international competitions and plays for NTT West. He has won gold medals in the men's team event at the 2022 Asian Games, 2025 Asian Soft Tennis Championships and 2026 Asian Games.

== Career ==
Hirooka was born on 2 June 1999 in Hyogo Prefecture. He began playing soft tennis at the age of five with Sanda Junior and later attended Uemiya Junior High School and Uemiya High School in Osaka Prefecture. He joined NTT West in 2018.

In 2019, Hirooka competed at the inaugural Asian Junior Soft Tennis Championships in San Jose del Monte, Philippines. He won the U21 men's doubles title with Shunsuke Kamioka and finished runner-up in the U21 men's singles event.

At the 2022 Asian Games, held in Hangzhou in 2023, Hirooka was a member of the Japanese men's team that won the gold medal in the team event. The Japanese team included Hayato Funemizu, Riku Uchida, Takafumi Uchimoto and Toshiki Uematsu.

In 2023, Hirooka and Koichi Nagae won the men's doubles title at the All Japan Soft Tennis Championships. He also won the All Japan Mixed Doubles Soft Tennis Championships that year.

In 2024, Hirooka and Nagae won the men's doubles title at the All Japan Social Soft Tennis Championships in Ishikawa Prefecture. They defeated Toshiki Uematsu and Hayato Funemizu in the final.

Hirooka represented Japan at the 2025 Asian Soft Tennis Championships in Mungyeong, South Korea. He helped Japan win the men's team gold medal and defeated South Korea's Hwang Bo-un in the decisive singles match in the final. He was also eliminated in the second round of the men's singles event.

At the 2026 Asian Games in Aichi-Nagoya, Hirooka again represented Japan in the men's team event and won his second Asian Games gold medal.
