= Swimming at the 2022 Asian Games – Women's 200 metre backstroke =

Women's 200 metre backstroke at the 2022 Asian Games
- Venue: Hangzhou Olympic Expo Aquatics Center
- Date: 26 September 2023
- Competitors: 19 from 13 nations

Medalists
gold medal	Peng Xuwei	China
silver medal	Liu Yaxin	China
bronze medal	Lee Eun-ji	South Korea

The women's 200 metre backstroke event at the 2022 Asian Games took place on 26 September 2023 at the Hangzhou Olympic Expo Center.

== Schedule ==
All times are China Standard Time (UTC+08:00)

Date	Time	Event
Tuesday, 26 September 2023	10:37	Heats
Tuesday, 26 September 2023	19:46	Final

== Records ==
Prior to this competition, the existing world, Asian and Games records were as follows.

World Record	Kaylee McKeown (AUS)	2:03.14	Sydney, Australia	10 March 2023
Asian Record	Zhao Jing (CHN)	2:06.46	Guangzhou, China	14 November 2010
Games Record	Zhao Jing (CHN)	2:06.46	Guangzhou, China	14 November 2010

== Results ==
=== Heats ===
Rank	Heat	Athlete	Time	Notes
1	3	Peng Xuwei (CHN)	2:09.67	
2	1	Lee Eun-ji (KOR)	2:11.42	
3	1	Mio Narita (JPN)	2:11.62	
4	2	Liu Yaxin (CHN)	2:13.96	
5	3	Rio Shirai (JPN)	2:14.17	
6	2	Cindy Cheung (HKG)	2:14.69	
7	3	Xeniya Ignatova (KAZ)	2:14.98	
8	2	Xiandi Chua (PHI)	2:15.44	
9	3	Faith Khoo (SGP)	2:18.57	
10	2	Jinjutha Pholjamjumrus (THA)	2:19.79	
11	3	Chloe Isleta (PHI)	2:20.28	
12	1	Mia Millar (THA)	2:20.54	
13	1	Jessica Cheng (HKG)	2:21.15	
14	2	Palak Joshi (IND)	2:25.81	
15	3	Elizaveta Rogozhnikova (KGZ)	2:26.28	
16	1	Ganga Seneviratne (SRI)	2:26.37	
17	3	Enkh-Amgalangiin Ariuntamir (MGL)	2:31.09	
18	1	Enkhbaataryn Anima (MGL)	2:39.76	
19	2	Fatima Adnan Lotia (PAK)	2:53.04	

=== Final ===
Rank	Athlete	Time	Notes
1st place, gold medalist(s)	Peng Xuwei (CHN)	2:07.28	
2nd place, silver medalist(s)	Liu Yaxin (CHN)	2:08.70	
3rd place, bronze medalist(s)	Lee Eun-ji (KOR)	2:09.75	
4	Mio Narita (JPN)	2:10.72	
5	Cindy Cheung (HKG)	2:12.44	
6	Xeniya Ignatova (KAZ)	2:12.82	
7	Xiandi Chua (PHI)	2:13.63	
8	Rio Shirai (JPN)	2:14.39	
