= Swimming at the 2022 Asian Games – Women's 200 metre breaststroke =

Women's 200 metre breaststroke at the 2022 Asian Games
- Venue: Hangzhou Olympic Expo Aquatics Center
- Date: 28 September 2023
- Competitors: 17 from 10 nations

Medalists
gold medal	Ye Shiwen	China
silver medal	Kwon Se-hyun	South Korea
bronze medal	Runa Imai	Japan

The Women's 200 metre breaststroke event at the 2022 Asian Games took place on 28 September 2023 at the Hangzhou Olympic Expo Center.

== Schedule ==
All times are China Standard Time (UTC+08:00)

Date	Time	Event
Thursday, 28 September 2023	10:23	Heats
Thursday, 28 September 2023	19:42	Final

== Records ==
Prior to this competition, the existing world, Asian and Games records were as follows.

World Record	Evgeniia Chikunova (RUS)	2:17.55	Kazan, Russia	21 April 2023
Asian Record	Rie Kaneto (JPN)	2:19.65	Tokyo, Japan	9 April 2016
Games Record	Kanako Watanabe (JPN)	2:21.82	Incheon, South Korea	22 September 2014

== Results ==
=== Heats ===
Rank	Heat	Athlete	Time	Notes
1	3	Ye Shiwen (CHN)	2:27.09	
2	3	Kwon Se-hyun (KOR)	2:28.78	
3	2	Ko Ha-ru (KOR)	2:29.26	
4	2	Runa Imai (JPN)	2:30.18	
4	3	Letitia Sim (SGP)	2:30.18	
6	1	Reona Aoki (JPN)	2:30.64	
7	1	Zhu Leiju (CHN)	2:31.79	
8	1	Chang Yujuan (HKG)	2:33.32	
9	3	Phiangkhwan Pawapotako (THA)	2:33.97	
10	2	Lam Hoi Kiu (HKG)	2:34.12	
11	2	Christie Chue (SGP)	2:38.54	
12	3	Phurichaya Junyamitree (THA)	2:40.29	
13	2	Valerie Tarazi (PLE)	2:40.99	
14	1	Chen Pui Lam (MAC)	2:41.84	
15	2	Batnasangiin Maral (MGL)	3:03.31	
16	1	Enkhbaataryn Ermüün (MGL)	3:18.77	
17	3	Een Abbas Shareef (MDV)	3:24.27	

=== Final ===
Rank	Athlete	Time	Notes
1st place, gold medalist(s)	Ye Shiwen (CHN)	2:23.84	
2nd place, silver medalist(s)	Kwon Se-hyun (KOR)	2:26.31	
3rd place, bronze medalist(s)	Runa Imai (JPN)	2:26.41	
4	Letitia Sim (SGP)	2:26.43	
5	Ko Ha-ru (KOR)	2:26.66	
6	Reona Aoki (JPN)	2:28.07	
7	Zhu Leiju (CHN)	2:32.19	
8	Chang Yujuan (HKG)	2:33.23	
