= Swimming at the 2022 Asian Games – Women's 400 metre individual medley =

Women's 400 metre individual medley at the 2022 Asian Games
- Venue: Hangzhou Olympic Expo Aquatics Center
- Date: 27 September 2023
- Competitors: 13 from 8 nations

Medalists
gold medal	Yu Yiting	China
silver medal	Ageha Tanigawa	Japan
bronze medal	Mio Narita	Japan

The women's 400 metre individual medley event at the 2022 Asian Games took place on 27 September 2023 at the Hangzhou Olympic Sports Expo Center.

== Schedule ==
All times are China Standard Time (UTC+08:00)

Date	Time	Event
Wednesday, 27 September 2023	11:15	Heats
Wednesday, 27 September 2023	20:38	Final

== Records ==
Prior to this competition, the existing world, Asian and Games records were as follows.

World Record	Summer McIntosh (CAN)	4:25.87	Toronto, Canada	1 April 2023
Asian Record	Ye Shiwen (CHN)	4:28.43	London, United Kingdom	28 July 2012
Games Record	Ye Shiwen (CHN)	4:32.97	Incheon, South Korea	23 September 2014

== Results ==
=== Heats ===
Rank	Heat	Athlete	Time	Notes
1	2	Yu Yiting (CHN)	4:44.25	
2	2	Ageha Tanigawa (JPN)	4:44.91	
3	1	Mio Narita (JPN)	4:47.53	
4	1	Kamonchanok Kwanmuang (THA)	4:48.07	
5	1	Ge Chutong (CHN)	4:50.88	
6	1	Jinjutha Pholjamjumrus (THA)	4:54.12	
7	2	Xiandi Chua (PHI)	4:55.83	
8	2	Ng Lai Wa (HKG)	4:56.99	
9	1	Cheang Weng Chi (MAC)	5:09.95	
10	2	Chloe Cheng (HKG)	5:11.94	
11	2	Batnasangiin Maral (MGL)	5:53.02	
12	2	Meral Ayn Latheef (MDV)	6:21.73	
13	1	Een Abbas Shareef (MDV)	6:40.93	

=== Final ===
Rank	Athlete	Time	Notes
1st place, gold medalist(s)	Yu Yiting (CHN)	4:35.44	
2nd place, silver medalist(s)	Ageha Tanigawa (JPN)	4:35.65	
3rd place, bronze medalist(s)	Mio Narita (JPN)	4:38.77	
4	Ge Chutong (CHN)	4:42.46	
5	Kamonchanok Kwanmuang (THA)	4:44.04	
6	Jinjutha Pholjamjumrus (THA)	4:50.07	
7	Xiandi Chua (PHI)	4:50.50	
8	Ng Lai Wa (HKG)	4:57.79	
