= Swimming at the 2022 Asian Games – Men's 200 metre butterfly =

Men's 200 metre butterfly at the 2022 Asian Games
- Venue: Hangzhou Olympic Expo Aquatics Center
- Date: 29 September 2023
- Competitors: 20 from 13 nations

Medalists
gold medal	Tomoru Honda	Japan
silver medal	Wang Kuan-hung	Chinese Taipei
bronze medal	Chen Juner	China

The men's 200 metre butterfly event at the 2022 Asian Games took place on 29 September 2023 at the Hangzhou Olympic Expo Center.

== Schedule ==
All times are China Standard Time (UTC+08:00)

Date	Time	Event
Friday, 29 September 2023	11:29	Heats
Friday, 29 September 2023	20:48	Final

== Records ==
Prior to this competition, the existing world, Asian and Games records were as follows.

World Record	Kristóf Milák (HUN)	1:50.34	Budapest, Hungary	21 June 2022
Asian Record	Daiya Seto (JPN)	1:52.53	Beijing, China	18 January 2020
Games Record	Takeshi Matsuda (JPN)	1:54.02	Guangzhou, China	13 November 2010

== Results ==
=== Heats ===
Rank	Heat	Athlete	Time	Notes
1	3	Tomoru Honda (JPN)	1:53.30	GR
2	3	Niu Guangsheng (CHN)	1:56.99	
3	2	Wang Kuan-hung (TPE)	1:57.01	
4	2	Chen Juner (CHN)	1:57.74	
5	1	Moon Seung-woo (KOR)	1:58.33	
6	3	Sajan Prakash (IND)	1:58.40	
7	1	Tepperi Morimoto (JPN)	1:58.51	
8	2	Navaphat Wongcharoen (THA)	2:01.54	
9	2	James Lau (HKG)	2:02.96	
10	1	Nguyễn Quang Thuấn (VIE)	2:03.57	
11	1	Nicholas Lim (HKG)	2:04.09	
12	3	Surasit Thongdeang (THA)	2:04.89	
13	2	Aneesh S. Gowda (IND)	2:05.21	
14	3	Lim Yin Chuen (MAS)	2:06.76	
15	3	Mohamed Ismail (QAT)	2:09.98	
16	1	Tameem El-Hamayda (QAT)	2:11.36	
17	1	Enkhbaataryn Ninjin (MGL)	2:18.33	
18	2	Azhar Abbas (PAK)	2:25.87	
19	3	Mohamed Rihan Shiham (MDV)	2:28.17	
20	2	Ahmed Neeq Niyaz (MDV)	3:00.55	

=== Final ===
Rank	Athlete	Time	Notes
1st place, gold medalist(s)	Tomoru Honda (JPN)	1:53.15	GR
2nd place, silver medalist(s)	Wang Kuan-hung (TPE)	1:54.53	
3rd place, bronze medalist(s)	Chen Juner (CHN)	1:56.04	
4	Niu Guangsheng (CHN)	1:56.12	
5	Sajan Prakash (IND)	1:57.44	
6	Moon Seung-woo (KOR)	1:58.24	
7	Teppei Morimoto (JPN)	1:59.01	
8	Navaphat Wongcharoen (THA)	2:00.50	
