= Natsumi Asano =

Japanese footballer (born 1997)

Personal information
- Date of birth: 14 April 1997 (age 29)
- Place of birth: Kanagawa Prefecture, Japan
- Height: 1.75 m (5 ft 9 in)
- Position: Goalkeeper

Team information
- Current team: Chifure AS Elfen Saitama
- Number: 1

Senior career*
Years	Team	Apps	(Gls)
2015–	Chifure AS Elfen Saitama		
- * Club domestic league appearances and goals

Natsumi Asano (born 14 April 1997) is a Japanese professional footballer. She plays as a goalkeeper for WE League club Chifure AS Elfen Saitama.

== Club career ==
Asano made her WE League debut on 2 October 2021.
