= Takafumi Uchimoto =

Japanese soft tennis player

Personal information
- Native name: 内本 隆文
- Nationality: Japanese
- Born: 19 February 1998 (age 28) Osaka Prefecture, Japan
- Education: Waseda University
- Employer: NTT West

Sport
- Sport: Soft tennis
- Position: Back player
Medal record
Representing Japan
Asian Soft Tennis Championships
| Gold medal – first place | 2016 Chiba | Men's singles |
| Silver medal – second place | 2016 Chiba | Men's doubles |
| Gold medal – first place | 2025 Mungyeong | Men's doubles |
| Gold medal – first place | 2025 Mungyeong | Men's team |
World Soft Tennis Championships
| Gold medal – first place | 2019 Taizhou | Men's team |
| Bronze medal – third place | 2019 Taizhou | Mixed doubles |
Asian Games
| Gold medal – first place | 2022 Hangzhou | Men's team |
| Gold medal – first place | 2026 Aichi-Nagoya | Men's team |

Takafumi Uchimoto (Japanese: 内本 隆文, born 19 February 1998) is a Japanese soft tennis player. A right-handed back player, he represents Japan internationally and plays for NTT West. He is a two-time Asian champion in men's singles and men's doubles, having won the singles title at the 2016 Asian Soft Tennis Championships and the doubles title at the 2025 Asian Soft Tennis Championships. He has also won gold medals in the men's team event at the 2022 Asian Games and 2026 Asian Games.

== Career ==
Uchimoto was born on 19 February 1998 in Osaka Prefecture. He began playing soft tennis at the age of six after being introduced to the sport by his parents. He attended Uemiya Junior High School and Uemiya High School before studying at Waseda University. He joined NTT West after graduating from university.

Uchimoto won multiple national titles during his junior and university career, including the All Japan Intercollegiate team championship in 2016 and 2017. He also won the men's singles and doubles events at the 2015 Inter-High School Championships, partnering with Kaito Maruyama in the doubles event.

In 2016, Uchimoto made his senior international debut at the 2016 Asian Soft Tennis Championships in Chiba, Japan. He won the men's singles gold medal and the men's doubles silver medal with Kaito Maruyama.

At the 2019 World Soft Tennis Championships in Taizhou, China, Uchimoto won the men's team gold medal and the mixed doubles bronze medal with Rurika Kuroki.

Uchimoto represented Japan at the 2022 Asian Games, held in Hangzhou in 2023. He won the men's team gold medal as part of the Japanese team alongside Hayato Funemizu, Sora Hirooka, Riku Uchida and Toshiki Uematsu.

In 2025, Uchimoto returned to the Japanese national team for the 2025 Asian Soft Tennis Championships in Mungyeong, South Korea. He won the men's doubles title with Toshiki Uematsu, defeating fellow Japanese pair Shunsuke Ueoka and Kaito Maruyama in the final. Japan also won the men's team event.

In June 2026, Uchimoto and Rena Yoshida finished runners-up at the All Japan Mixed Doubles Soft Tennis Championships, losing to Rena Temma and Takuya Kurosaka in the final.

At the 2026 Asian Games in Aichi-Nagoya, Uchimoto won his second consecutive Asian Games men's team gold medal as a member of the Japanese team.
