= Swimming at the 2022 Asian Games – Women's 1500 metre freestyle =

Women's 1500 metre freestyle at the 2022 Asian Games
- Venue: Hangzhou Olympic Expo Aquatics Center
- Date: 24 September 2023
- Competitors: 10 from 7 nations

Medalists
gold medal	Li Bingjie	China
silver medal	Gao Weizhong	China
bronze medal	Yukimi Moriyama	Japan

The women's 1500 metre freestyle event at the 2022 Asian Games took place on 24 September 2023 at the Hangzhou Olympic Expo Center.

== Schedule ==
All times are China Standard Time (UTC+08:00)

Date	Time	Event
Sunday, 24 September 2023	10:28	Slow heat
Sunday, 24 September 2023	19:45	Fast heat

== Records ==
Prior to this competition, the existing world, Asian and Games records were as follows.

World Record	Katie Ledecky (USA)	15:20.48	Indianapolis, United States	16 May 2018
Asian Record	Wang Jianjiahe (CHN)	15:41.49	Tokyo, Japan	26 July 2021
Games Record	Wang Jianjiahe (CHN)	15:53.68	Jakarta, Indonesia	19 August 2018

== Results ==
Rank	Heat	Athlete	Time	Notes
1st place, gold medalist(s)	2	Li Bingjie (CHN)	15:51.18	GR
2nd place, silver medalist(s)	2	Gao Weizhong (CHN)	16:05.73	
3rd place, bronze medalist(s)	2	Yukimi Moriyama (JPN)	16:17.78	
4	2	Gan Ching Hwee (SGP)	16:24.67	
5	2	Han Da-kyung (KOR)	16:37.34	
6	2	Miyu Namba (JPN)	16:41.80	
7	1	Nikita Lam (HKG)	17:12.74	
8	2	Võ Thị Mỹ Tiên (VIE)	17:18.89	
9	1	Nip Tsz Yin (HKG)	17:27.98	
10	1	Anna Nikishkina (KGZ)	18:45.25	
