= Reina Wakisaka =

Japanese footballer

Personal information
- Date of birth: 2 May 1995 (age 31)
- Place of birth: Takatsuki, Japan
- Height: 1.60 m (5 ft 3 in)
- Position: Midfielder

Team information
- Current team: Cerezo Osaka Yanmar
- Number: 10

Senior career*
Years	Team	Apps	(Gls)
2021–2022	Nojima Stella		
2022–2023	INAC Kobe Leonessa		
2023–	Cerezo Osaka Yanmar		
- * Club domestic league appearances and goals

Reina Wakisaka (born 2 May 1999) is a Japanese professional footballer who plays as a midfielder for WE League club Cerezo Osaka Yanmar Ladies.

== Club career ==
Wakisaka made her WE League debut on 12 September 2021.
