= Swimming at the 2022 Asian Games – Women's 50 metre butterfly =

Women's 50 metre butterfly at the 2022 Asian Games
- Venue: Hangzhou Olympic Expo Aquatics Center
- Date: 29 September 2023
- Competitors: 31 from 23 nations

Medalists
gold medal	Zhang Yufei	China
silver medal	Yu Yiting	China
bronze medal	Rikako Ikee	Japan

The Women's 50 metre butterfly event at the 2022 Asian Games took place on 29 September 2023 at the Hangzhou Olympic Expo Center.

== Schedule ==
All times are China Standard Time (UTC+08:00)

Date	Time	Event
Friday, 29 September 2023	10:00	Heats
Friday, 29 September 2023	19:30	Final

== Records ==
Prior to this competition, the existing world, Asian and Games records were as follows.

World Record	Sarah Sjöström (SWE)	24.43	Borås, Sweden	5 July 2014
Asian Record	Zhang Yufei (CHN)	25.05	Fukuoka, Japan	29 July 2023
Games Record	Rikako Ikee (JPN)	25.55	Jakarta, Indonesia	20 August 2018

== Results ==
=== Heats ===
Rank	Heat	Athlete	Time	Notes
1	4	Zhang Yufei (CHN)	25.78	
2	4	Yu Yiting (CHN)	25.85	
3	3	Rikako Ikee (JPN)	26.22	
4	2	Ai Soma (JPN)	26.28	
5	3	Sofia Spodarenko (KAZ)	26.45	
6	3	Jenjira Srisa-ard (THA)	26.85	
7	4	Quah Ting Wen (SGP)	26.87	Withdrew
8	4	Huang Mei-chien (TPE)	26.88	
9	2	Quah Jing Wen (SGP)	26.97	
10	1	Jeong So-eun (KOR)	26.98	Advanced
11	2	Natalie Kan (HKG)	27.23	
12	2	Tam Hoi Lam (HKG)	27.50	
13	3	Jasmine Al-Khaldi (PHI)	27.72	
14	2	Nina Venkatesh (IND)	27.80	
15	4	Nguyễn Thuý Hiền (VIE)	27.89	
16	3	Phạm Thị Vân (VIE)	28.12	
17	3	Valerie Tarazi (PLE)	28.13	
18	4	Angel Gabriella Yus (INA)	28.57	
19	2	Pak Mi-song (PRK)	28.61	
20	1	Elizaveta Rogozhnikova (KGZ)	28.84	
21	2	Pannita Chawanuchit (THA)	29.82	
22	3	Ri Hye-gyong (PRK)	30.00	
23	4	Kuan I Cheng (MAC)	30.16	
24	2	Üüriintsolmongiin Nandin-Erdene (MGL)	30.36	
25	4	Mira Al-Shehhi (UAE)	31.21	
26	1	Southada Daviau (LAO)	31.66	
27	3	Sonia Khatun (BAN)	31.74	
28	1	Ekaterina Bordachyova (TJK)	31.85	
29	1	Hanan Hussain Haleem (MDV)	32.23	
30	1	Oyuundalaigiin Iveel (MGL)	32.96	
31	1	Ameena Ameer Qadri (PAK)	33.11	

=== Final ===
Rank	Athlete	Time	Notes
1st place, gold medalist(s)	Zhang Yufei (CHN)	25.10	GR
2nd place, silver medalist(s)	Yu Yiting (CHN)	25.71	
3rd place, bronze medalist(s)	Rikako Ikee (JPN)	26.02	
4	Ai Soma (JPN)	26.07	
5	Sofia Spodarenko (KAZ)	26.43	
6	Huang Mei-chien (TPE)	26.89	
7	Jenjira Srisa-ard (THA)	26.95	
8	Jeong So-eun (KOR)	27.04	
