= Shun Ayukawa =

Japanese footballer (born 2001)

Shun Ayukawa 鮎川 峻
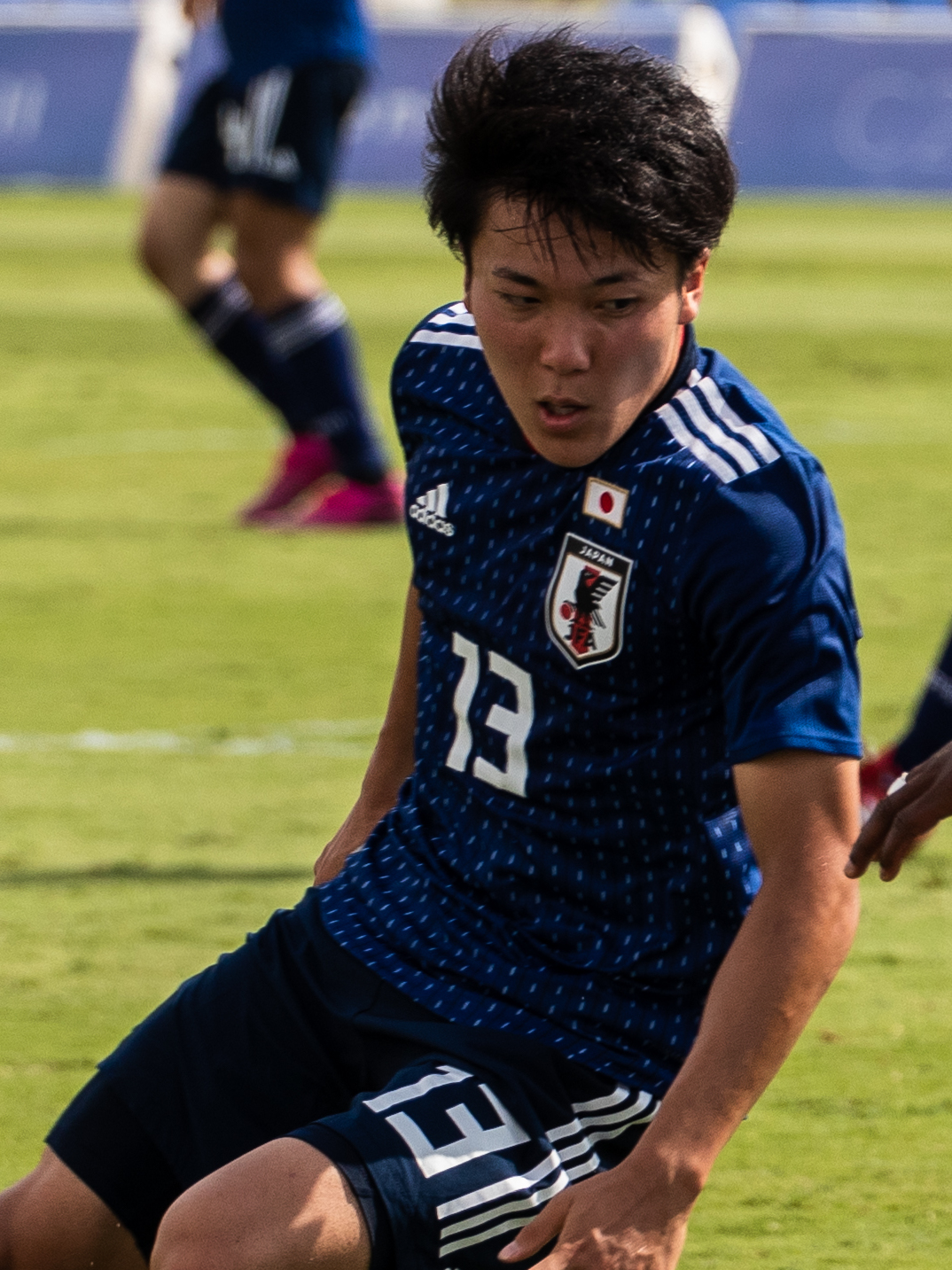
- Ayukawa playing for Japan U19 in 2019

Personal information
- Full name: Shun Ayukawa
- Date of birth: 15 September 2001 (age 25)
- Place of birth: Kasugai, Aichi, Japan
- Height: 1.64 m (5 ft 5 in)
- Position: Forward

Team information
- Current team: Sanfrecce Hiroshima
- Number: 23

Youth career
- FC Fervor Aichi
- 2017–2019: Sanfrecce Hiroshima

Senior career*
| Years | Team | Apps | (Gls) |
| 2020– | Sanfrecce Hiroshima | 25 | (2) |
| 2023–2025 | → Oita Trinita (loan) | 51 | (7) |

International career^{‡}
- Japan U17
- Japan U18
| 2019 | Japan U19 | 2 | (0) |
| 2023 | Japan U23 | 4 | (3) |
Medal record
Men's football
Representing Japan
Asian Games
| Silver medal – second place | 2022 Hangzhou | Team |
- * Club domestic league appearances and goals as of 1 January 2026 ‡ National team caps and goals as of 15:48, 25 November 2023 (UTC)

Shun Ayukawa (鮎川 峻, Ayukawa Shun; born 15 September 2001) is a Japanese footballer currently playing as a forward for J1 League club Sanfrecce Hiroshima.

== Early life ==
Ayukawa was born in Kasugai. He played youth football for FC Fervor Aichi and Sanfreece Hiroshima.

== Career ==
Ayukawa made his debut for Sanfreece against Vegalta Sendai on 27 February 2021. He scored his first goal for the club on 21 March 2021, scoring in the 90th+3rd minute.

In the middle of the 2023 season, Ayukawa moved on loan to J2 League club Oita Trinita. He made his debut for Oita against Shimizu S-Pulse on 9 July 2023. He scored his first goal for the club against Fujieda MYFC, scoring in the 33rd minute on 12 August 2023.

The loan was extended in December 2023 and would remain at Oita for the 2024 season.

== International career ==
Shun was called up for the Japan U17s and U18s. He has caps for the U19s.

Shun made his debut for the Japan U23s on 25 September 2023. He scored his first goals on 28 September 2023, scoring a brace against Myanmar U23s.

== Career statistics ==
=== Club ===
As of 2 April 2026

Appearances and goals by club, season and competition
| Club | Season | League | | | National cup (Note: Includes Emperors Cup) | | League cup (Note: Includes J.League Cup) | | Total | |
| Club | Season | Division | Apps | Goals | Apps | Goals | Apps | Goals | Apps | Goals |
|---|---|---|---|---|---|---|---|---|---|---|
| Sanfrecce Hiroshima | 2021 | J1 League | 19 | 1 | 1 | 0 | 6 | 1 | 26 | 2 |
| Sanfrecce Hiroshima | 2022 | J1 League | 3 | 1 | 0 | 0 | 0 | 0 | 3 | 1 |
| Sanfrecce Hiroshima | 2023 | J1 League | 3 | 0 | 1 | 0 | 5 | 0 | 9 | 0 |
| Sanfrecce Hiroshima | 2026 | J1 (100) | 0 | 0 | 0 | 0 | 0 | 0 | 0 | 0 |
| Sanfrecce Hiroshima | Total | | 25 | 2 | 2 | 0 | 11 | 1 | 38 | 3 |
| Oita Trinita (loan) | 2023 | J2 League | 14 | 3 | 0 | 0 | 0 | 0 | 14 | 3 |
| Oita Trinita (loan) | 2024 | J2 League | 15 | 3 | 2 | 1 | 0 | 0 | 17 | 4 |
| Oita Trinita (loan) | 2025 | J2 League | 22 | 1 | 2 | 0 | 1 | 0 | 25 | 1 |
| Oita Trinita (loan) | Total | | 51 | 7 | 4 | 1 | 1 | 0 | 56 | 8 |
| Career total | | | 76 | 9 | 6 | 1 | 12 | 1 | 94 | 11 |
