= Football at the 2022 Asian Games =

Sports Event at 2022 hangzhou asian games

- Venues: Eight stadiums across Zhejiang
- Dates: 19 September – 7 October 2023
- Nations: 27
- Teams: 21 (Men's); 16 (Women's)

Medalists
gold medal	South Korea (men); Japan (women)
silver medal	Japan (men); North Korea (women)
bronze medal	Uzbekistan (men); China (women)

Football at the 2022 Asian Games in Hangzhou was held from 19 September to 7 October 2023.

The draw for the tournament was held on 27 July 2023 in Hangzhou, China. A total 21 men's and 16 women's teams took part in this year's Asian Games football competition.

== Competition schedule ==
All times are local China Standard Time (UTC+8).

G	Group stage	1/8	Round of 16	1/4	Quarter-finals	1/2	Semi-finals	B	Bronze medal match	F	Gold medal match

Date Event	Tue 19	Wed 20	Thu 21	Fri 22	Sat 23	Sun 24	Mon 25	Tue 26	Wed 27	Thu 28	Fri 29	Sat 30	Sun 1	Mon 2	Tue 3	Wed 4	Thu 5	Fri 6		Sat 7	
Men	G					G			1/8				1/4			1/2				B	F
Women			G			G			G			1/4			1/2			B	F		

== Venues ==
Hangzhou
Xihu	Shangcheng	Linping	Xiaoshan
Huanglong Sports Centre Stadium	Shangcheng Sports Centre Stadium	Linping Sports Center Stadium	Xiaoshan Sports Centre Stadium
Capacity: 51,971	Capacity: 13,500	Capacity: 10,200	Capacity: 10,118
Map of Zhejiang with 2022 Football of Asian Games venues marked.
Jinhua		Wenzhou	
Wucheng		Longwan	Lucheng
Jinhua Stadium	Zhejiang Normal University East Stadium	Wenzhou Olympic Sports Center Stadium	Wenzhou Sports Centre Stadium
Capacity: 29,800	Capacity: 12,273	Capacity: 50,000	Capacity: 18,000

== Participating teams ==
=== Men's tournament ===
- ~~Afghanistan~~ (withdrew)
- Bahrain
- Bangladesh
- China (host)
- Chinese Taipei
- Hong Kong
- India
- Indonesia
- Iran
- Japan
- Kuwait
- Kyrgyzstan
- Mongolia
- Myanmar
- North Korea
- Palestine
- Qatar
- Saudi Arabia
- South Korea
- ~~Syria~~ (withdrew)
- Thailand
- Uzbekistan
- Vietnam

=== Women's tournament ===
- Bangladesh
- ~~Cambodia~~ (withdrew)
- China (host)
- Chinese Taipei
- Hong Kong
- India
- Japan
- Mongolia
- Myanmar
- Nepal
- North Korea
- Philippines
- Singapore
- South Korea
- Thailand
- Uzbekistan
- Vietnam

== Men's tournament ==
=== Group stage ===
The 23 men's national teams were divided into six groups. Groups A, B, C, E and F consist of 4 teams each, while Group D has 3 teams. 16 teams will qualify for the Knockout stage, the top 2 teams from each group along with the four best third-placed teams to advance for the round of 16. The draw was held on 27 July 2023 in Hangzhou, China.

Syria and Afghanistan were initially assigned to Group C, but they both withdrew after the draw, leaving the group with only two teams and direct qualification to the next stage.

==== Group A ====
Pos	Team	Pld	W	D	L	GF	GA	GD	Pts	Qualification
1	China (H)	3	2	1	0	9	1	+8	7	Knockout stage
2	India	3	1	1	1	3	6	−3	4	Knockout stage
3	Myanmar	3	1	1	1	2	5	−3	4	Knockout stage
4	Bangladesh	3	0	1	2	0	2	−2	1	

Source: Football – Men – Groups
Rules for classification: Group stage tiebreakers
(H) Hosts

==== Group B ====
Pos	Team	Pld	W	D	L	GF	GA	GD	Pts	Qualification
1	Iran	3	2	1	0	7	0	+7	7	Knockout stage
2	Saudi Arabia	3	2	1	0	6	1	+5	7	Knockout stage
3	Vietnam	3	1	0	2	5	9	−4	3	
4	Mongolia	3	0	0	3	2	10	−8	0	

Source: Football – Men – Groups
Rules for classification: Group stage tiebreakers

==== Group C ====
Pos	Team	Pld	W	D	L	GF	GA	GD	Pts	Qualification
1	Uzbekistan	2	2	0	0	3	1	+2	6	Knockout stage
2	Hong Kong	2	0	0	2	1	3	−2	0	Knockout stage
3	Syria	0	0	0	0	0	0	0	0	Withdrew
4	Afghanistan	0	0	0	0	0	0	0	0	Withdrew

Source: Football – Men – Groups
Rules for classification: Group stage tiebreakers

==== Group D ====
Pos	Team	Pld	W	D	L	GF	GA	GD	Pts	Qualification
1	Japan	2	2	0	0	4	1	+3	6	Knockout stage
2	Palestine	2	0	1	1	0	1	−1	1	Knockout stage
3	Qatar	2	0	1	1	1	3	−2	1	Knockout stage

Source: Football – Men – Groups
Rules for classification: Group stage tiebreakers

==== Group E ====
Pos	Team	Pld	W	D	L	GF	GA	GD	Pts	Qualification
1	South Korea	3	3	0	0	16	0	+16	9	Knockout stage
2	Bahrain	3	0	2	1	2	5	−3	2	Knockout stage
3	Thailand	3	0	2	1	2	6	−4	2	Knockout stage
4	Kuwait	3	0	2	1	2	11	−9	2	

Source: Football – Men – Groups
Rules for classification: Group stage tiebreakers

==== Group F ====
Pos	Team	Pld	W	D	L	GF	GA	GD	Pts	Qualification
1	North Korea	3	3	0	0	4	0	+4	9	Knockout stage
2	Kyrgyzstan	3	1	0	2	4	4	0	3 (Note: Head-to-head goal differences: Kyrgyzstan 4–3, Indonesia 2–1, Chinese Taipei 2–4)	Knockout stage
3	Indonesia	3	1	0	2	2	2	0	3	Knockout stage
4	Chinese Taipei	3	1	0	2	2	6	−4	3	

Source: Football – Men – Groups
Rules for classification: Group stage tierbreakers

=== Ranking of third-placed teams ===
Pos	Grp	Team	Pld	W	D	L	GF	GA	GD	Pts	Qualification
1	F	Indonesia	2	1	0	1	2	1	+1	3	Knockout stage
2	D	Qatar	2	0	1	1	1	3	−2	1	Knockout stage
3	E	Thailand	2	0	1	1	1	5	−4	1	Knockout stage
4	A	Myanmar	2	0	1	1	1	5	−4	1	Knockout stage
5	B	Vietnam	2	0	0	2	1	7	−6	0	

Source: Football – Men – Groups

=== Knockout stage ===
Round of 16
27 September – Xihu
China	1
Qatar	0
27 September – Wucheng
South Korea	5
Kyrgyzstan	1
28 September – Shangcheng
Uzbekistan (a.e.t.)	2
Indonesia	0
28 September – Xihu
India	0
Saudi Arabia	2
27 September – Shangcheng
Iran	2
Thailand	0
27 September – Xiaoshan
Hong Kong	1
Palestine	0
28 September – Xiaoshan
Japan	7
Myanmar	0
27 September – Lanxi
North Korea	2
Bahrain	0

Quarter-finals
1 October – Xihu
China	0
South Korea	2
1 October – Xihu
Uzbekistan	2
Saudi Arabia	1
1 October – Shangcheng
Iran	0
Hong Kong	1
1 October – Xiaoshan
Japan	2
North Korea	1

Semi-finals
4 October – Xihu
South Korea	2
Uzbekistan	1
4 October – Xiaoshan
Hong Kong	0
Japan	4

Final
7 October – Xihu
South Korea	2
Japan	1
Bronze medal match
7 October – Shangcheng
Uzbekistan	4
Hong Kong	0

== Women's tournament ==
=== Group stage ===
The 18 women's national teams were divided into 5 groups. Groups B and C consisted of three teams each, while Groups A, D and E have four teams each. The five group winners along with the three best runner-ups will qualify for the knockout stage. The draw was held on 27 July 2023 in Hangzhou, China.

Iran was initially assigned to Group A and Cambodia was initially assigned to Group C, but they both withdrew after the draw.

==== Group A ====
Pos	Team	Pld	W	D	L	GF	GA	GD	Pts	Qualification
1	China (H)	2	2	0	0	22	0	+22	6	Knockout stage
2	Uzbekistan	2	1	0	1	6	6	0	3	Knockout stage
3	Mongolia	2	0	0	2	0	22	−22	0	
4	Iran	0	0	0	0	0	0	0	0	Withdrew

Source: Football – Women – Groups
Rules for classification: Group stage tiebreakers
(H) Hosts

==== Group B ====
Pos	Team	Pld	W	D	L	GF	GA	GD	Pts	Qualification
1	Chinese Taipei	2	2	0	0	3	1	+2	6	Knockout stage
2	Thailand	2	1	0	1	1	1	0	3	Knockout stage
3	India	2	0	0	2	1	3	−2	0	

Source: Football – Women – Groups
Rules for classification: Group stage tiebreakers

==== Group C ====
Pos	Team	Pld	W	D	L	GF	GA	GD	Pts	Qualification
1	North Korea	2	2	0	0	17	0	+17	6	Knockout stage
2	Singapore	2	0	0	2	0	17	−17	0	
3	Cambodia	0	0	0	0	0	0	0	0	Withdrew

Source: Football – Women – Groups
Rules for classification: Group stage tiebreakers

==== Group D ====
Pos	Team	Pld	W	D	L	GF	GA	GD	Pts	Qualification
1	Japan	3	3	0	0	23	0	+23	9	Knockout stage
2	Vietnam	3	2	0	1	8	8	0	6	
3	Nepal	3	0	1	2	1	11	−10	1	
4	Bangladesh	3	0	1	2	2	15	−13	1	

Source: Football – Women – Groups
Rules for classification: Group stage tiebreakers

==== Group E ====
Pos	Team	Pld	W	D	L	GF	GA	GD	Pts	Qualification
1	South Korea	3	3	0	0	13	1	+12	9	Knockout stage
2	Philippines	3	2	0	1	7	6	+1	6	Knockout stage
3	Myanmar	3	1	0	2	1	6	−5	3	
4	Hong Kong	3	0	0	3	1	9	−8	0	

Source: Football – Women – Groups
Rules for classification: Group stage tiebreakers

=== Knockout stage ===
Quarter-finals
30 September 2023 – Linping
China	4
Thailand	0
30 September 2023 – Wenzhou
Japan	8
Philippines	1
30 September 2023 – Linping
Chinese Taipei	1
Uzbekistan (a.e.t.)	2
30 September 2023 – Wenzhou
South Korea	1
North Korea	4

Semi-finals
3 October 2023 – Linping
China	3
Japan	4
3 October 2023 – Shangcheng
Uzbekistan	0
North Korea	8

Gold medal match
6 October 2023 – Huanglong
Japan	4
North Korea	1
Bronze medal match
6 October 2023 – Huanglong
China	7
Uzbekistan	0

== Medal summary ==
=== Medal table ===
* Host nation (China)

Rank	Nation	Gold	Silver	Bronze	Total
1	Japan	1	1	0	2
2	South Korea	1	0	0	1
3	North Korea	0	1	0	1
4	China*	0	0	1	1
4	Uzbekistan	0	0	1	1
Totals (5 entries)		2	2	2	6

=== Medalists ===
Event	Gold	Silver	Bronze
Men	South Korea; Lee Gwang-yeon; Hwang Jae-won; Choi Jun; Park Jin-seob; Lee Jae-ik; Hong Hyun-seok; Jeong Woo-yeong; Paik Seung-ho; Park Jae-yong; Cho Young-wook; Um Won-sang; Min Seong-jun; Goh Young-joon; Lee Han-beom; Jeong Ho-yeon; Kim Tae-hyeon; Song Min-kyu; Lee Kang-in; Seol Young-woo; An Jae-jun; Kim Jeong-hoon; Park Kyu-hyun	Japan; Kazuki Fujita; Hayato Okuda; Manato Yoshida; Taichi Yamasaki; Seiya Baba; Daiki Matsuoka; Ibuki Konno; Masato Shigemi; Shun Ayukawa; Jun Nishikawa; Yuta Matsumura; Yuma Obata; Kein Sato; Yota Komi; Teppei Yachida; Kakeru Yamauchi; Shota Hino; Taiki Yamada; Kotaro Uchino; Koshiro Sumi; Kenta Nemoto; Hiroki Sekine	Uzbekistan; Otabek Boymurodov; Saidazamat Mirsaidov; Makhmud Makhamadzhonov; Shokhzhakhon Sultonmurodov; Mukhammadkodir Khamraliev; Bekhzod Shamsiev; Khojimat Erkinov; Ibrokhim Ibrokhimov; Ulugbek Khoshimov; Jasurbek Jaloliddinov; Otabek Jurakuziev; Vladimir Nazarov; Eldorbek Begimov; Ibrokhimkhalil Yuldoshev; Sherzod Esanov; Asadbek Rakhimzhonov; Diyor Kholmatov; Alibek Davronov; Khusayin Norchaev; Ruslanbek Jiyanov; Khamidullo Abdunabiev; Alisher Odilov
Women	Japan; Natsumi Asano; Shinomi Koyama; Haruna Tabata; Wakaba Goto; Reina Wakisaka; Rio Sasaki; Yuzuki Yamamoto; Chihiro Ishida; Mami Ueno; Yuzuho Shiokoshi; Yoshino Nakashima; Shu Ohba; Mei Shimada; Momoko Tanikawa; Remina Chiba; Suzu Amano; Toko Koga; Mamiko Matsumoto; Maya Hijikata; Haruka Osawa; Kotono Sakakibara	North Korea; Kim Un-hui; Yu Son-gum; Pak Ju-mi; Ri Myong-gum; Ri Kum-hyang; Pong Song-ae; Pak Sin-Jong; Son Ok-ju; Ri Pom-Hyang; Ri Hye-gyong; Myong Yu-jong; Ri Su-jong; Ju Hyo-sim; Choe Kum-ok; Kim Chungmi; Wi Jong-sim; Kim Hye-yong; Sung Hyang-sim; Ri Hak; An Myong-song; Hong Song-ok; Kim Kyong-yong	China; Zhu Yu; Li Mengwen; Dou Jiaxing; Wang Linlin; Liu Yanqiu; Zhang Xin; Wang Shuang; Yao Wei; Shen Mengyu; Zhang Rui; Wang Shanshan; Xu Huan; Yang Lina; Lou Jiahui; Chen Qiaozhu; Yao Lingwei; Yan Jinjin; Zhang Linyan; Ou Yiyao; Wu Ri Gu Mu La; Gu Yasha; Pan Hongyan
