= 2023–24 in Indonesian football =

Football in Indonesia
- Season: 2023

The following article presents a summary of the 2023 football season in Indonesia.

== National teams ==
=== Men's national football team ===
25 March 2023 Int'l Friendly	Indonesia	3–1	Burundi	Bekasi, Indonesia
20:30 UTC+7	Yakob 6'; Dendy 14'; Ridho 44'	Report	Niyongabire 51'	Stadium: Patriot Candrabhaga Stadium; Attendance: 4,448; Referee: Razlan Joffri Ali (Malaysia)

28 March 2023 Int'l Friendly	Burundi	2–2	Indonesia	Bekasi, Indonesia
20:30 UTC+7	Berahino 80'; Bigirimana 90'	Report	Witan 61'; Amat 90+4'	Stadium: Patriot Candrabhaga Stadium; Attendance: 2,018; Referee: Razlan Joffri Ali (Malaysia)

14 June 2023 Int'l Friendly	Indonesia	0–0	Palestine	Surabaya, Indonesia
19:30 UTC+7		Report		Stadium: Gelora Bung Tomo Stadium; Attendance: 32,537; Referee: Muhammad Usaid Jamal (Malaysia)

19 June 2023 Friendly	Indonesia	0–2	Argentina	Jakarta, Indonesia
19:30 UTC+7		Report	Paredes 38'; Romero 55'	Stadium: Gelora Bung Karno Stadium; Attendance: 56,060; Referee: Muhammad Usaid Jamal (Malaysia)

8 September 2023 Int'l Friendly	Indonesia	2–0	Turkmenistan	Surabaya, Indonesia
19:30 UTC+7	Dendy 19'; Egy 90+1'	Report		Stadium: Gelora Bung Tomo Stadium; Attendance: 13,814; Referee: Muhammad Usaid bin Jamal (Malaysia)

==== 2022 AFF Championship ====
2 January 2023 Group A	Philippines	1–2	Indonesia	Manila, Philippines
20:30 UTC+8	Rasmussen 83'	Report (AFFMEC); Report (AFF)	Dendy 21'; Marselino 43'	Stadium: Rizal Memorial Stadium; Attendance: 2,370; Referee: Ahmed Faisal Al Ali (Jordan)

6 January 2023 Semi-finals	Indonesia	0–0	Vietnam	Jakarta, Indonesia
16:30 UTC+7		Report (AFFMEC); Report (AFF)		Stadium: Gelora Bung Karno Stadium; Attendance: 49,595; Referee: Omar Al-Yaqoubi (Oman)

9 January 2023 Semi-finals	Vietnam	2–0	Indonesia	Hanoi, Vietnam
19:30 UTC+7	Nguyễn Tiến Linh 3', 47'	Report (AFFMEC); Report (AFF)		Stadium: Mỹ Đình National Stadium; Attendance: 37,675; Referee: Yusuke Araki (Japan)

==== 2026 FIFA World Cup qualification – AFC first round ====
12 October 2023 First round	Indonesia	6–0	Brunei	Jakarta, Indonesia
19:00 UTC+7	Drajad 7', 72', 90+2'; Ridho 12'; Sananta 63' (pen.), 67'	Report		Stadium: Gelora Bung Karno Stadium; Attendance: 23,318; Referee: Bijan Heydari (Iran)

17 October 2023 First round	Brunei	0–6	Indonesia	Bandar Seri Begawan, Brunei
20:15 UTC+8		Report	Hokky 6', 44'; Egy 42'; Witan 47' (pen.); Ridho 63'; Sananta 81'	Stadium: Hassanal Bolkiah National Stadium; Attendance: 17,281; Referee: Ahmed Faisal Al-Ali (Jordan)

==== 2026 FIFA World Cup qualification – AFC second round ====
16 November 2023 Second round	Iraq	5–1	Indonesia	Basra, Iraq
17:45 UTC+3	Resan 20'; Amat 35' (o.g.); Rashid 60'; Amyn 81'; Al-Hamadi 88'	Report	Pattynama 45+3'	Stadium: Basra International Stadium; Attendance: 64,447; Referee: Ahmed Eisa (United Arab Emirates)

21 November 2023 Second round	Philippines	1–1	Indonesia	Manila, Philippines
19:00 UTC+8	Reichelt 23'	Report	Saddil 70'	Stadium: Rizal Memorial Stadium; Attendance: 9,880; Referee: Kim Jong-hyeok (South Korea)
Note: The home match of Indonesia against the Philippines is to be swapped with the away match because it coincides with the 2023 FIFA U-17 World Cup schedule. The change was confirmed on 31 October 2023 by FIFA.

=== Men's under-23 football team ===
11 April 2023 Friendly	Indonesia	1–1	(Indonesia) Bhayangkara	Jakarta, Indonesia
	Titan 5'	Report	Dendy 75'	Stadium: Madya Stadium

14 April 2023 Int'l Friendly	Indonesia	1–2	Lebanon	Jakarta, Indonesia
20:30 UTC+7	Ali Alrida 84' (o.g.)	Report	Sabah 90'; Nasser 90+6'	Stadium: Gelora Bung Karno Stadium; Referee: Fariq Hitaba (Indonesia)

16 April 2023 Int'l Friendly	Lebanon	0–1	Indonesia	Jakarta, Indonesia
20:30 UTC+7		Report	Beckham 5'	Stadium: Gelora Bung Karno Stadium; Referee: Yudi Nurcahya (Indonesia)

==== 2023 Southeast Asian Games ====
29 April 2023 Group A	Indonesia	3–0	Philippines	Phnom Penh, Cambodia
16:00 UTC+7	Marselino 45'; Irfan 89'; Fajar 90+1'	Report		Stadium: Olympic Stadium; Attendance: 14,500; Referee: Rowan Arumughan (India)

4 May 2023 Group A	Indonesia	5–0	Myanmar	Phnom Penh, Cambodia
16:00 UTC+7	Marselino 19'; Sananta 31' (pen.), 59'; Fajar 73'; Titan 87'	Report		Stadium: Olympic Stadium; Attendance: 1,652; Referee: Jumpei Iida (Japan)

7 May 2023 Group A	Timor-Leste	0–3	Indonesia	Phnom Penh, Cambodia
16:00 UTC+7		Report	Sananta 44'; Fajar 62', 74'	Stadium: Olympic Stadium; Attendance: 2,765; Referee: Nazmi Nasaruddin (Malaysia)

10 May 2023 Group A	Cambodia	1–2	Indonesia	Phnom Penh, Cambodia
19:00 UTC+7	Sovannmakara 45+1'	Report	Titan 9'; Beckham 51'	Stadium: Olympic Stadium; Attendance: 29,168; Referee: Shen Yinhao (China)

13 May 2023 Semi-finals	Indonesia	3–2	Vietnam	Phnom Penh, Cambodia
16:00 UTC+7	Komang 9'; Ferarri 53'; Taufany 90+6'	Report	Nguyễn Văn Tùng 36'; Bagas 79' (o.g.)	Stadium: Olympic Stadium; Attendance: 7,864; Referee: Kim Hee-gon (South Korea)

16 May 2023 Final	Indonesia	5–2 (a.e.t.)	Thailand	Phnom Penh, Cambodia
19:30 UTC+7	Sananta 20', 45+3'; Irfan 94'; Fajar 107'; Beckham 120'	Report	Anan 65'; Yotsakorn 90+7'	Stadium: Olympic Stadium; Attendance: 28,133; Referee: Qasim Al-Hatmi (Oman)

==== 2023 AFF U-23 Championship ====
18 August 2023 Group B	Malaysia	2–1	Indonesia	Rayong, Thailand
20:00 UTC+7	Tierney 54' (pen.), 63'	Report	Sananta 29'	Stadium: Rayong Province Stadium; Attendance: 700; Referee: Hiroki Kasahara (Japan)

20 August 2023 Group B	Indonesia	1–0	Timor-Leste	Rayong, Thailand
20:00 UTC+7	Sananta 45'	Report		Stadium: Rayong Province Stadium; Attendance: 253; Referee: Torpong Somsing (Thailand)

24 August 2023 Semi-finals	Thailand	1–3	Indonesia	Rayong, Thailand
20:00 UTC+7	Chukid 27'	Report	Sroyer 10'; Ferarri 23'; Natcha 45+1' (o.g.)	Stadium: Rayong Province Stadium; Attendance: 395; Referee: Hiroki Kasahara (Japan)

26 August 2023 Final	Vietnam	0–0 (a.e.t.) (6–5 p)	Indonesia	Rayong, Thailand
20:00 UTC+7		Report		Stadium: Rayong Province Stadium; Attendance: 1,542; Referee: Hiroki Kasahara (Japan)
	Penalties
	Nguyễn Đức Việt (penalty scored); Đinh Xuân Tiến (penalty scored); Lê Nguyên Hoàng (penalty scored); Trần Nam Hải (penalty scored); Lương Duy Cương (penalty scored); Thái Bá Đạt (penalty scored)		(penalty scored) Dewangga; (penalty scored) Arkhan; (penalty scored) Frengky; (penalty scored) Sroyer; (penalty scored) Sananta; (penalty missed) Ernando

==== 2024 AFC U-23 Asian Cup qualification ====
9 September 2023 Group K	Indonesia	9–0	Chinese Taipei	Surakarta, Indonesia
19:00 UTC+7	Marselino 2', 58'; Sananta 6'; Struick 19'; Witan 29'; Rio 40'; Baggott 56'; Hokky 78'; Arhan 85'	Report		Stadium: Manahan Stadium; Attendance: 14,540; Referee: Shukri Hussain (Saudi Arabia)

12 September 2023 Group K	Turkmenistan	0–2	Indonesia	Surakarta, Indonesia
19:00 UTC+7		Report	Jenner 41'; Arhan 90+2'	Stadium: Manahan Stadium; Attendance: 15,890; Referee: Kim Dae-yong (South Korea)

==== 2022 Asian Games ====
19 September 2023 Group F	Indonesia	2–0	Kyrgyzstan	Jinhua, China
19:30 UTC+8	Rumakiek 58'; Samir 90+2'	Report		Stadium: Zhejiang Normal University East Stadium; Attendance: 1,445; Referee: Baraa Aisha (Palestine)

21 September 2023 Group F	Chinese Taipei	1–0	Indonesia	Jinhua, China
16:00 UTC+8	Chin Wen-yen 47'	Report		Stadium: Zhejiang Normal University East Stadium; Attendance: 894; Referee: Mohamed Javiz (Maldives)

24 September 2023 Group F	North Korea	1–0	Indonesia	Jinhua, China
16:00 UTC+8	Kim Yu-song 40'	Report		Stadium: Zhejiang Normal University East Stadium; Attendance: 7,288; Referee: Khalid Al-Turais (Saudi Arabia)

28 September 2023 Round of 16	Uzbekistan	2–0 (a.e.t.)	Indonesia	Hangzhou, China
16:30 UTC+8	Esanov 92', 120+1'	Report		Stadium: Shangcheng Sports Centre Stadium; Attendance: 9,466; Referee: Mohammed Ahmed Al-Shammari (Qatar)

=== Men's under-20 football team ===
==== 2023 PSSI U-20 Mini Tournament ====
17 February 2023 Mini Tournament	Indonesia	4–0	Fiji	Jakarta, Indonesia
19:30 UTC+7	Arkhan 35'; Kakang 50'; Resa 60'; Hokky 86'	Report		Stadium: Gelora Bung Karno Stadium; Referee: Thoriq Alkatiri (Indonesia)

19 February 2023 Mini Tournament	Indonesia	1–2	New Zealand	Jakarta, Indonesia
19:30 UTC+7	Ferarri 90+5'	Report	Colloty 58'; Herdman 70'	Stadium: Gelora Bung Karno Stadium; Referee: Fariq Hitaba (Indonesia)

21 February 2023 Mini Tournament	Indonesia	0–1	Guatemala	Jakarta, Indonesia
19:30 UTC+7		Report	Solorzano 22'	Stadium: Gelora Bung Karno Stadium; Referee: Thoriq Alkatiri (Indonesia)

==== 2023 AFC U-20 Asian Cup ====
1 March 2023 Group A	Indonesia	0–2	Iraq	Tashkent, Uzbekistan
17:00 UTC+5		Report	Abdulkareem 28'; Jameel 90+6'	Stadium: Lokomotiv Stadium; Attendance: 120; Referee: Sadullo Gulmurodi (Tajikistan)

4 March 2023 Group A	Syria	0–1	Indonesia	Tashkent, Uzbekistan
17:00 UTC+5		Report	Hokky 35'	Stadium: Lokomotiv Stadium; Attendance: 95; Referee: Majed Al-Shamrani (Saudi Arabia)

7 March 2023 Group A	Uzbekistan	0–0	Indonesia	Fergana, Uzbekistan
19:00 UTC+5		Report		Stadium: Istiqlol Stadium; Attendance: 18,006; Referee: Majed Al-Shamrani (Saudi Arabia)

=== Men's under-17 football team ===
2 August 2023 Friendly	Indonesia	0–3	(Spain) Barcelona U-19 (Juvenil A)	Denpasar, Indonesia
19:30 UTC+8		Report	Fariñas 36'; Olmedo 45+1'; Fernández 48'	Stadium: Ngurah Rai Stadium; Referee: Aprisman Aranda (Indonesia)

5 August 2023 Friendly	Indonesia	2–3	(Japan) Kashima Antlers U18s	Denpasar, Indonesia
19:30 UTC+8	Dennis 56' (pen.); Riski 64'	Report	Haruto 45+2'; Oyama 70', 88'	Stadium: Ngurah Rai Stadium

30 August 2023 Int'l Friendly	Indonesia	0–1	South Korea	Bekasi, Indonesia
19:00 UTC+7		Report	Ga-on 66'	Stadium: Patriot Candrabhaga Stadium; Referee: Naufal Adya (Indonesia)

==== 2023 FIFA U-17 World Cup ====
10 November 2023 Group A	Indonesia	1–1	Ecuador	Surabaya, Indonesia
19:00 UTC+7	Arkhan 22'	Report	Obando 28'	Stadium: Gelora Bung Tomo Stadium; Attendance: 30,583; Referee: Espen Eskås (Norway)

13 November 2023 Group A	Indonesia	1–1	Panama	Surabaya, Indonesia
19:00 UTC+7	Arkhan 54'	Report	Castillo 45+3'	Stadium: Gelora Bung Tomo Stadium; Attendance: 17,239; Referee: Rade Obrenovič (Slovenia)

16 November 2023 Group A	Morocco	3–1	Indonesia	Surabaya, Indonesia
19:00 UTC+7	Alaoui 29' (pen.); Aït Boudlal 39'; Hamony 64'	Report	Asyura 42'	Stadium: Gelora Bung Tomo Stadium; Attendance: 26,454; Referee: Morten Krogh (Denmark)

=== Women's national football team ===
22 February 2023 Int'l Friendly	Saudi Arabia	1–1	Indonesia	Dammam, Saudi Arabia
18:00 UTC+3	Abdulrazak 85'	Report	Amiatun 8'	Stadium: Prince Mohamed bin Fahd Stadium; Referee: Veronika Bernatskaia (Kyrgyzstan)

26 February 2023 Int'l Friendly	Indonesia	1–0	Saudi Arabia	Dammam, Saudi Arabia
18:00 UTC+3	Amiatun 18'	Report		Stadium: Prince Mohamed bin Fahd Stadium; Referee: Veronika Bernatskaia (Kyrgyzstan)

==== 2024 AFC Women's Olympic Qualifying Tournament ====
8 April 2023 First round	Indonesia	0–5	Lebanon	Jounieh, Lebanon
14:30 UTC+3		Report	Iskandar 29', 79'; Khoury 45+2' (pen.); Bou Rada 59' (pen.); Maalouf 69'	Stadium: Fouad Chehab Stadium; Referee: Nguyễn Thị Hằng Nga (Vietnam)

11 April 2023 First round	Chinese Taipei	4–0	Indonesia	Jounieh, Lebanon
14:30 UTC+3	Wang Hsiang-huei 7'; Hsu Yi-yun 35'; Remini 87' (o.g.); Wu Kai-ching 90'	Report		Stadium: Fouad Chehab Stadium; Referee: Veronika Bernatskaya (Kyrgyz Republic)

=== Women's under-20 football team ===
==== 2024 AFC U-20 Women's Asian Cup qualification ====
7 March 2023 First round	Vietnam	3–0	Indonesia	Việt Trì, Vietnam
18:00 UTC+7	Lưu Hoàng Vân 2'; Hoàng Thị Ngọc Ánh 8'; Vũ Thị Hoa 37' (pen.)	Report		Stadium: Việt Trì Stadium; Attendance: 6,888; Referee: Kim Yu-Jeong (South Korea)

9 March 2023 First round	Indonesia	0–6	India	Việt Trì, Vietnam
15:00 UTC+7		Report	Neha 4', 22'; Dsouza 45'; Narzary 56'; S. Kumari 74', 90+1'	Stadium: Việt Trì Stadium; Attendance: 6,238; Referee: Anjana Rai (Nepal)

11 March 2023 First round	Singapore	0–4	Indonesia	Việt Trì, Vietnam
15:00 UTC+7		Report	Helsya 11', 79'; Marsela 37'; Liza 67'	Stadium: Việt Trì Stadium; Attendance: 2,288; Referee: Wang Chieh (Chinese Taipei)

==== 2023 AFF U-19 Women's Championship ====
5 July 2023 Group A	Indonesia	7–0	Timor-Leste	Palembang, Indonesia
19:30 UTC+7	Awi 10', 64'; Claudia 25'; Helsya 35'; Wandik 45'; Ayunda 66', 90'	Report		Stadium: Gelora Sriwijaya Stadium

7 July 2023 Group A	Laos	1–4	Indonesia	Palembang, Indonesia
19:30 UTC+7	Chaikam 12'	Report	Sava 17'; Claudia 45+3', 68'; Ayunda 83'	Stadium: Gelora Sriwijaya Stadium

9 July 2023 Group A	Indonesia	5–0	Cambodia	Palembang, Indonesia
19:30 UTC+7	Claudia 32'; Awi 48'; Ayunda 58'; Sheva 60', 90+4'	Report		Stadium: Gelora Sriwijaya Stadium

13 July 2023 Semi-finals	Indonesia	1–7	Thailand	Palembang, Indonesia
19:30 UTC+7	Claudia 24'	Report	Thawanrat 15', 31', 70'; Anaphon 29', 47'; Chattaya 63'; Natcha 87'	Stadium: Gelora Sriwijaya Stadium

15 July 2023 Third place match	Myanmar	1–1 (a.e.t.) (4–2 p)	Indonesia	Palembang, Indonesia
15:30 UTC+7	Yin Loon Eain 30'	Report	Awi 49' (pen.)	Stadium: Gelora Sriwijaya Stadium
	Penalties
	Theingi Htwe (penalty scored); Sandar Lin (penalty scored); Phyu Phyu Win (penalty scored); Phyu Phwe (penalty scored)		(penalty missed) Helsya; (penalty scored) Claudia; (penalty scored) Awi; (penalty missed) Ellen

=== Men's national futsal team ===
18 September 2023 Int'l Friendly	Indonesia	3–0	Timor-Leste	Malang, Indonesia
20:00 UTC+7	Samuel Eko; Rio Pangestu	Report		Stadium: Unggul Sports Center

20 September 2023 Friendly	Indonesia	3–3	(Thailand) Black Pearl United	Malang, Indonesia
20:00 UTC+7	Alfajri Zikri 28'; Samuel Eko 28'; Ardiansyah Nur 40'	Report	Koedbangrachan 3', 23', 26'	Stadium: Unggul Sports Center

22 September 2023 Friendly	Indonesia	3–2	(Thailand) Black Pearl United	Malang, Indonesia
20:00 UTC+7	Runtuboy; Samuel Eko; Syauqi Saud	Report	Pichayut; Lucas	Stadium: Unggul Sports Center

27 September 2023 Friendly	Indonesia	3–0	(Indonesia) Fafage Banua	Jakarta, Indonesia
20:00 UTC+7	Firman Adriansyah; Ardiansyah Nur	Report		Stadium: GOR UNJ

29 September 2023 Int'l Friendly	Bahrain	0–3	Indonesia	Isa Town, Bahrain
16:00 UTC+3

==== 2024 AFC Futsal Asian Cup qualification ====
7 October 2023 Group B	Indonesia	12–0	Macau	Dammam, Saudi Arabia
16:00 UTC+3	Antonio 3' (o.g.); Runtuboy 4', 37'; Syauqi 16', 18', 39'; Alfajri 17'; Samuel 23'; So Ka Chon 28' (o.g.); Soumilena 34', 39', 39'	Report		Stadium: Green Hall

9 October 2023 Group B	Afghanistan	7–7	Indonesia	Dammam, Saudi Arabia
16:00 UTC+3	Amiri 2' (pen.), 12'; Hossein Poor 3', 24'; Norowzi 9'; Gholami 12'; Gorgej 38'	Report	Samuel Eko 7', 28', 36'; Rio Pangestu 20'; Hossaini 36' (o.g.); Runtuboy 39'; Ardiansyah Nur 40'	Stadium: Green Hall

11 October 2023 Group B	Indonesia	2–3	Saudi Arabia	Dammam, Saudi Arabia
19:00 UTC+3	Runtuboy 14', 17'	Report	A. Alotaibi 8'; Otaibi Al Owairan 9', 15'	Stadium: Green Hall

=== Men's national beach soccer team ===
==== 2023 AFC Beach Soccer Asian Cup ====
17 March 2023 Group C	Japan	7–0	Indonesia	Pattaya, Thailand
18:30 UTC+7	Akaguma 2', 18'; Yamada 12', 23'; Moreira 21', 29'; Yamauchi 28'	Report		Stadium: Jomtien Beach Arena; Referee: Suwat Wongsuwan (Thailand)

19 March 2023 Group C	Indonesia	0–12	Lebanon	Pattaya, Thailand
15:30 UTC+7		Report	Merhi 10', 18', 26'; El Khatib 12'; Bate 18' (o.g.); Al Saleh 19'; Mi. Matar 25'; Haidar 26'; Grada 27', 33'; Abdullah 30'; Me. Matar 36'	Stadium: Jomtien Beach Arena; Referee: Nayim Kosimov (Uzbekistan)

21 March 2023 Group C	China	5–4	Indonesia	Pattaya, Thailand
15:30 UTC+7	Bai Fan 13', 18'; Cai Weiming 21'; Han Xuegeng 24'; Liu Haoran 24'	Report	Bate 6', 28'; Widnyana 9'; Dwipayudha 34'	Stadium: Jomtien Beach Arena; Referee: Suwat Wongsuwan (Thailand)
