= 2023 in South Korean football =

Football in South Korea
- Season: 2023

Men's football
- K League 1: Ulsan Hyundai
- K League 2: Gimcheon Sangmu
- K3 League: Hwaseong FC
- K4 League: Yeoju FC
- Korean FA Cup: Pohang Steelers

Women's football
- WK League: Incheon Hyundai Steel Red Angels

This article shows a summary of the 2023 football season in South Korea.

== National teams ==
=== FIFA World Cup qualification ===
16 November AFC second round, Group C	South Korea	5–0	Singapore	Seoul, South Korea
20:00 UTC+9	Cho Gue-sung 44'; Hwang Hee-chan 49'; Son Heung-min 63'; Hwang Ui-jo 68' (pen.); Lee Kang-in 85'	Report (FIFA); Report (AFC)		Stadium: Seoul World Cup Stadium; Attendance: 64,381; Referee: Bijan Heydari (Iran)

21 November AFC second round, Group C	China	0–3	South Korea	Shenzhen, China
20:00 UTC+8		Report (FIFA); Report (AFC)	Son Heung-min 11' (pen.), 45'; Jung Seung-hyun 87'	Stadium: Shenzhen Universiade Sports Centre; Attendance: 39,969; Referee: Abdulrahman Al-Jassim (Qatar)

=== Summer Olympics qualification ===
==== AFC U-23 Asian Cup qualification ====
9 September Group B	South Korea	1–0	Kyrgyzstan	Changwon, South Korea
20:00 UTC+9	Hong Yun-sang 3'	Report		Stadium: Changwon Football Center; Attendance: 7,021; Referee: Zhang Lei (China)

12 September Group B	South Korea	3–0	Myanmar	Changwon, South Korea
20:00 UTC+9	Paik Sang-hoon 5'; Jeon Byung-kwan 85'; Oh Jae-hyeok 90+2'	Report		Stadium: Changwon Football Center; Attendance: 3,838; Referee: Majed Al-Shamrani (Saudi Arabia)

Group B table
Pos	Team	Pld	W	D	L	GF	GA	GD	Pts	Qualification
1	South Korea (H)	2	2	0	0	4	0	+4	6	Qualification for U-23 Asian Cup
2	Kyrgyzstan	2	0	1	1	1	2	−1	1	
3	Myanmar	2	0	1	1	1	4	−3	1	

Source: AFC
Rules for classification: Qualification tiebreakers
(H) Hosts

==== Women's qualification ====
26 October AFC second round, Group B	South Korea	10–1	Thailand	Xiamen, China
15:30 UTC+8	Phair 33', 56', 66'; Chun Ga-ram 36', 49', 75'; Kang Chae-rim 39', 54'; Lee Geum-min 68'; Moon Mi-ra 72'	Report	Moondong 90+3'	Stadium: Xiamen Egret Stadium; Attendance: 2,269; Referee: Lê Thị Lý (Vietnam)

29 October AFC second round, Group B	North Korea	0–0	South Korea	Xiamen, China
15:30 UTC+8		Report		Stadium: Xiamen Egret Stadium; Attendance: 7,582; Referee: Lê Thị Lý (Vietnam)

1 November AFC second round, Group B	China	1–1	South Korea	Xiamen, China
19:30 UTC+8	Wang Shanshan 78'	Report	Shim Seo-yeon 62'	Stadium: Xiamen Egret Stadium; Attendance: 21,958; Referee: Kate Jacewicz (Australia)

AFC second round, Group B table
Pos	Team	Pld	W	D	L	GF	GA	GD	Pts	Qualification
1	North Korea	3	2	1	0	9	1	+8	7	Qualification for AFC third round
2	South Korea	3	1	2	0	11	2	+9	5	
3	China (H)	3	1	1	1	5	3	+2	4	
4	Thailand	3	0	0	3	1	20	−19	0	

Source: AFC
(H) Hosts

=== Asian Games ===
==== Men's tournament ====
19 September Group E	Kuwait	0–9	South Korea	Jinhua, China
19:30 UTC+8		Report	Jeong Woo-yeong 3', 45', 48'; Cho Young-wook 19', 74'; Paik Seung-ho 44'; Um Won-sang 52'; Park Jae-yong 80'; An Jae-jun 90+6'	Stadium: Jinhua Stadium; Attendance: 2,936; Referee: Hasan Akrami (Iran)

21 September Group E	South Korea	4–0	Thailand	Jinhua, China
19:30 UTC+8	Hong Hyun-seok 15'; An Jae-jun 20'; Um Won-sang 39'; Lee Jae-ik 45+1'	Report		Stadium: Jinhua Stadium; Attendance: 3,166; Referee: Ahmad Yacoub Ibrahim (Jordan)

24 September Group E	South Korea	3–0	Bahrain	Jinhua, China
19:30 UTC+8	Lee Han-beom 61'; Paik Seung-ho 74'; Goh Young-jun 84'	Report		Stadium: Jinhua Stadium; Referee: Yousif Saeed Hasan (Iraq)

Group E table
Pos	Team	Pld	W	D	L	GF	GA	GD	Pts	Qualification
1	South Korea	3	3	0	0	16	0	+16	9	Advance to knockout stage
2	Bahrain	3	0	2	1	2	5	−3	2	Advance to knockout stage
3	Thailand	3	0	2	1	2	6	−4	2	Advance to knockout stage
4	Kuwait	3	0	2	1	2	11	−9	2	

Source: Asian Games
Rules for classification: Group stage tiebreakers

27 September Round of 16	South Korea	5–1	Kyrgyzstan	Jinhua, China
19:30 UTC+8	Paik Seung-ho 11' (pen.); Jeong Woo-yeong 12', 74' (pen.); Cho Young-wook 79'; Hong Hyun-seok 85'	Report	Maksat Alygulov 28'	Stadium: Jinhua Stadium; Attendance: 18,393; Referee: Alex King (Australia)

1 October Quarter-finals	China	0–2	South Korea	Hangzhou, China
20:00 UTC+8		Report	Hong Hyun-seok 18'; Song Min-kyu 35'	Stadium: Huanglong Sports Centre Stadium; Attendance: 38,158; Referee: Qasim Al-Hatmi (Oman)

4 October Semi-finals	South Korea	2–1	Uzbekistan	Hangzhou, China
20:00 UTC+8	Jeong Woo-yeong 3', 38'	Report	Jaloliddinov 25'	Stadium: Huanglong Sports Centre Stadium; Attendance: 38,019; Referee: Ammar Ashkanani (Kuwait)

7 October Final	South Korea	2–1	Japan	Hangzhou, China
20:00 UTC+8	Jeong Woo-yeong 27'; Cho Young-wook 56'	Report	Uchino 2'	Stadium: Hangzhou Sports Park Stadium; Attendance: 68,018; Referee: Ammar Mahfoodh (Bahrain)

==== Women's tournament ====
22 September Group E	South Korea	3–0	Myanmar	Wenzhou, China
19:30 UTC+8	Lee Eun-young 24'; Ji So-yun 60'; Jeon Eun-ha 68'	Report		Stadium: Wenzhou Sports Center Stadium; Attendance: 3,234; Referee: Doumouh Al Bakkar (Lebanon)

25 September Group E	Philippines	1–5	South Korea	Wenzhou, China
19:30 UTC+8	Bolden 8'	Report	Chun Ga-ram 12'; Son Hwa-yeon 44', 56', 70'; Ji So-yun 52' (pen.)	Stadium: Wenzhou Sports Center Stadium; Attendance: 2,974; Referee: Asaka Koizumi (Japan)

28 September Group E	South Korea	5–0	Hong Kong	Wenzhou, China
19:30 UTC+8	Moon Mi-ra 29', 45+1'; Mun Eun-ju 47', 70'; Wu Choi Yiu 52' (o.g.)	Report		Stadium: Wenzhou Olympic Sports Center Stadium; Attendance: 22,083; Referee: Lê Thị Lý (Vietnam)

Group E table
Pos	Team	Pld	W	D	L	GF	GA	GD	Pts	Qualification
1	South Korea	3	3	0	0	13	1	+12	9	Advance to knockout stage
2	Philippines	3	2	0	1	7	6	+1	6	Advance to knockout stage
3	Myanmar	3	1	0	2	1	6	−5	3	
4	Hong Kong	3	0	0	3	1	9	−8	0	

Source: Asian Games
Rules for classification: Group stage tiebreakers

30 September Quarter-finals	South Korea	1–4	North Korea	Wenzhou, China
16:30 UTC+8	An Myong-song 11' (o.g.)	Report	Ri Hak 20', 90'; An Myong-song 81'; Kim Kyong-yong 90+5'	Stadium: Wenzhou Sports Centre; Attendance: 6,171; Referee: Pansa Chaisanit (Thailand)

=== FIFA Women's World Cup ===
South Korea next qualified for the 2023 FIFA Women's World Cup. As in 2019, the team scored only one goal, but achieved a notable result by drawing their final match with Germany 1–1, which resulted in the Germans exiting the tournament at the group stage despite being second in the FIFA Ranking at the time.

25 July Group H	Colombia	2–0	South Korea	Sydney, Australia
12:00 UTC+10	Usme 30' (pen.); Caicedo 39'	Report		Stadium: Sydney Football Stadium; Attendance: 24,323; Referee: Rebecca Welch (England)

30 July Group H	South Korea	0–1	Morocco	Adelaide, Australia
14:00 UTC+9:30		Report	Jraïdi 6'	Stadium: Hindmarsh Stadium; Attendance: 12,886; Referee: Edina Alves Batista (Brazil)

3 August Group H	South Korea	1–1	Germany	Brisbane, Australia
20:00 UTC+10	Cho So-hyun 6'	Report	Popp 42'	Stadium: Lang Park; Attendance: 38,945; Referee: Anna-Marie Keighley (New Zealand)

Group H table
Pos	Team	Pld	W	D	L	GF	GA	GD	Pts	Qualification
1	Colombia	3	2	0	1	4	2	+2	6	Advance to knockout stage
2	Morocco	3	2	0	1	2	6	−4	6	Advance to knockout stage
3	Germany	3	1	1	1	8	3	+5	4	
4	South Korea	3	0	1	2	1	4	−3	1	

=== Friendlies ===
==== Senior team ====
24 March	South Korea	2–2	Colombia	Ulsan, South Korea
20:00 UTC+9	Son Heung-min 10', 45+2'	Report	Rodríguez 46'; Carrascal 49'	Stadium: Ulsan Munsu Football Stadium; Attendance: 35,727; Referee: Jumpei Iida (Japan)

28 March	South Korea	1–2	Uruguay	Seoul, South Korea
20:00 UTC+9	Hwang In-beom 51'	Report	Coates 10'; Vecino 63'	Stadium: Seoul World Cup Stadium; Attendance: 63,952; Referee: Yudai Yamamoto (Japan)

16 June	South Korea	0–1	Peru	Busan, South Korea
20:00 UTC+9		Report	Reyna 11'	Stadium: Busan Asiad Main Stadium; Attendance: 52,443; Referee: Shaun Evans (Australia)

20 June	South Korea	1–1	El Salvador	Daejeon, South Korea
20:00 UTC+9	Hwang Ui-jo 49'	Report	Roldán 87'	Stadium: Daejeon World Cup Stadium; Attendance: 39,823; Referee: Muhammad Taqi (Singapore)

7 September	Wales	0–0	South Korea	Cardiff, Wales
19:45 UTC+1		Report		Stadium: Cardiff City Stadium; Attendance: 13,668; Referee: Willie Collum (Scotland)

12 September	Saudi Arabia	0–1	South Korea	Newcastle upon Tyne, England
17:30 UTC+1		Report	Cho Gue-sung 32'	Stadium: St James' Park; Attendance: 3,000; Referee: Andrew Madley (England)

13 October	South Korea	4–0	Tunisia	Seoul, South Korea
20:00 UTC+9	Lee Kang-in 55', 57'; Meriah 66' (o.g.); Hwang Ui-jo 90+1'	Report		Stadium: Seoul World Cup Stadium; Attendance: 59,018; Referee: Amirul Izwan Yaacob (Malaysia)

17 October	South Korea	6–0	Vietnam	Suwon, South Korea
20:00 UTC+9	Kim Min-jae 5'; Hwang Hee-chan 27'; Võ Minh Trọng 50' (o.g.); Son Heung-min 61'; Lee Kang-in 70'; Jeong Woo-yeong 86'	Report		Stadium: Suwon World Cup Stadium; Attendance: 42,175; Referee: Amirul Izwan Yaacob (Malaysia)

==== Under-23 team ====
22 March	South Korea	3–0	Oman	Doha, Qatar
20:30 UTC+3	Eom Ji-sung 8'; Kim Sin-jin 33'; An Jae-jun 76'	Report		Stadium: Thani bin Jassim Stadium; Attendance: 0 Referee: Abdulhadi Al-Ruwaili (Qatar)

25 March	Iraq	0–1	South Korea	Doha, Qatar
20:30 UTC+3		Report	Goh Young-joon 89'	Stadium: Suheim bin Hamad Stadium; Attendance: 0 Referee: Khalid Al-Nabit (Qatar)

28 March	South Korea	3–0	United Arab Emirates	Doha, Qatar
20:30 UTC+3	An Jae-jun 58'; Hong Si-hoo 79', 86'	Report		Stadium: Abdullah bin Khalifa Stadium; Attendance: 0 Referee: Abdulrahman Al-Jassim (Qatar)

15 June	China	1–3	South Korea	Zhejiang, China
18:00 UTC+8	Xu Haoyang 63'	Report	Um Won-sang 51', 53'; Jeong Woo-yeong 60'	Stadium: Jinhua Sports Centre Stadium; Referee: Wang Di (China)

19 June	China	1–0	South Korea	Zhejiang, China
19:30 UTC+8	Sun Qinhan 45'	Report		Stadium: Jinhua Sports Centre Stadium; Attendance: 24,468; Referee: Jin Jingyuan (China)

6 September	South Korea	0–2	Qatar	Changwon, South Korea
20:00 UTC+9		Report	Al-Rawi 38'; Al-Abdullah 67'	Stadium: Changwon Football Center; Attendance: 4,352; Referee: Abdullah Jamali (Kuwait)

20 November	France	0–3	South Korea	Le Havre, France
18:30 UTC+1			Jeong Sang-bin 70', 79'; Hong Yun-sang 90+4'	Stadium: Stade Océane

==== Women's team ====
16 February	England	4–0	South Korea	Milton Keynes, England
19:45 UTC+0	Stanway 40' (pen.); Kelly 46'; Russo 50'; James 78'	Report		Stadium: Stadium MK; Attendance: 21,013; Referee: Andreza de Siqueira (Brazil)

19 February	Belgium	2–1	South Korea	Coventry, England
18:15 UTC+0	Wullaert 45+1'; De Caigny 68'	Report	Lee Geum-min 10'	Stadium: Coventry Building Society Arena; Referee: Frida Nielsen (Denmark)

22 February	South Korea	1–2	Italy	Bristol, England
		Report		Stadium: Ashton Gate Stadium

7 April	South Korea	5–2	Zambia	Suwon, South Korea
19:00 UTC+9	Cho So-hyun 24', 84'; Lee Geum-min 58', 62'; Park Eun-sun 90+1'	Report	Kundananji 38'; Banda 45+2'	Stadium: Suwon World Cup Stadium; Referee: Anna-Marie Keighley (New Zealand)

11 April	South Korea	5–0	Zambia	Yongin, South Korea
	Lee Geum-min 33' (pen.), 53', 77' (pen.); Park Eun-sun 35', 89'	Report		Stadium: Yongin Mireu Stadium; Referee: Anna-Marie Keighley (New Zealand)

8 July	South Korea	2–1	Haiti	Seoul, South Korea
17:00 UTC+9				Stadium: Seoul World Cup Stadium

== Leagues ==
=== K League 1 ===
Pos	Team	Pld	W	D	L	GF	GA	GD	Pts	Qualification or relegation (Note: Teams played each other three times (33 matches), before the league was split into two groups, the top six and the bottom six.)
1	Ulsan Hyundai (C)	38	23	7	8	63	42	+21	76	Qualification for Champions League Elite league stage (Note: Since second-placed team Pohang Steelers qualified for the Champions League Elite as the Korean FA Cup champions, the spot given to the second-placed team was passed to the third-placed team.)
2	Pohang Steelers	38	16	16	6	53	40	+13	64	Qualification for Champions League Elite league stage
3	Gwangju FC	38	16	11	11	47	35	+12	59	Qualification for Champions League Elite league stage
4	Jeonbuk Hyundai Motors	38	16	9	13	45	35	+10	57	Qualification for Champions League Two group stage
5	Incheon United	38	14	14	10	46	42	+4	56	
6	Daegu FC	38	13	14	11	42	43	−1	53	
7	FC Seoul	38	14	13	11	63	49	+14	55	
8	Daejeon Hana Citizen	38	12	15	11	56	58	−2	51	
9	Jeju United	38	10	11	17	43	49	−6	41	
10	Gangwon FC (O)	38	6	16	16	30	41	−11	34	Qualification for relegation play-offs
11	Suwon FC (O)	38	8	9	21	44	76	−32	33	Qualification for relegation play-offs
12	Suwon Samsung Bluewings (R)	38	8	9	21	35	57	−22	33	Relegation to K League 2

Source: Soccerway, K League
Rules for classification: 1) Points; 2) Goals scored; 3) Goal difference; 4) Wins; 5) Head-to-head points
(C) Champions; (O) Play-off winners; (R) Relegated

=== K League 2 ===
==== Regular season ====
Pos	Team	Pld	W	D	L	GF	GA	GD	Pts	Promotion or qualification
1	Gimcheon Sangmu (C, P)	36	22	5	9	71	37	+34	71	Promotion to K League 1
2	Busan IPark	36	20	10	6	50	29	+21	70	Qualification for promotion play-offs final round
3	Gimpo FC	36	16	12	8	40	25	+15	60	Qualification for promotion play-offs second round
4	Gyeongnam FC	36	15	12	9	54	42	+12	57	Qualification for promotion play-offs first round
5	Bucheon FC 1995	36	16	9	11	45	35	+10	57	Qualification for promotion play-offs first round
6	FC Anyang	36	15	9	12	58	51	+7	54	
7	Jeonnam Dragons	36	16	5	15	55	56	−1	53	
8	Chungbuk Cheongju	36	13	13	10	37	42	−5	52	
9	Seongnam FC	36	11	11	14	43	50	−7	44	
10	Chungnam Asan	36	12	6	18	39	46	−7	42	
11	Seoul E-Land	36	10	5	21	36	54	−18	35	
12	Ansan Greeners	36	6	7	23	40	72	−32	25	
13	Cheonan City	36	5	10	21	33	62	−29	25	

Source: K League Soccerway
Rules for classification: 1) Points; 2) Goals scored; 3) Goal difference; 4) Wins; 5) Head-to-head points
(C) Champions; (P) Promoted

==== Promotion play-offs ====
First round
4	Gyeongnam FC	0
5	Bucheon FC 1995	0

Second round
3	Gimpo FC	2
4	Gyeongnam FC	1

Final 1
Gimpo FC	0	1	1
Gangwon FC	0	2	2
Final 2
Busan IPark	2	2	4
Suwon FC (a.e.t.)	1	5	6

=== K3 League ===
Pos	Team	Pld	W	D	L	GF	GA	GD	Pts	Qualification or relegation
1	Hwaseong FC (C)	28	17	9	2	42	21	+21	60	
2	FC Mokpo	28	15	8	5	48	26	+22	53	
3	Gimhae FC	28	13	10	5	42	26	+16	49	
4	Ulsan Citizen	28	13	8	7	36	29	+7	47	
5	Daejeon Korail	28	11	6	11	34	32	+2	39	
6	Siheung Citizen	28	10	9	9	37	36	+1	39	
7	Paju Citizen	28	11	5	12	32	27	+5	38	
8	Chuncheon Citizen	28	9	11	8	25	26	−1	38	
9	Busan Transportation Corporation	28	9	7	12	34	36	−2	34	
10	Gyeongju KHNP	28	8	10	10	28	32	−4	34	
11	Pocheon Citizen	28	7	12	9	26	33	−7	33	
12	Gangneung Citizen	28	8	8	12	27	35	−8	32	
13	Yangpyeong FC	28	7	6	15	28	43	−15	27	
14	Changwon City (O)	28	7	6	15	23	39	−16	27	Qualification for relegation play-off
15	Yangju Citizen (R)	28	4	7	17	29	50	−21	19	Relegation to K4 League

Source: JoinKFA Livesport
Rules for classification: 1) Points; 2) Goal difference; 3) Goals scored; 4) Wins
(C) Champions; (O) Play-off winners; (R) Relegated

=== K4 League ===
==== Regular season ====
Pos	Team	Pld	W	D	L	GF	GA	GD	Pts	Qualification
1	Yeoju FC (C, P)	30	20	3	7	63	44	+19	63	Promotion to K3 League
2	Daegu FC B (P)	30	16	7	7	51	36	+15	55	Promotion to K3 League
3	Geoje Citizen	30	15	8	7	64	37	+27	53	Qualification for promotion play-offs
4	Jinju Citizen	30	16	4	10	45	37	+8	52	Qualification for promotion play-offs
5	Pyeongchang United	30	14	8	8	61	54	+7	50	
6	Jeonbuk Hyundai Motors B	30	14	7	9	59	45	+14	49	
7	Dangjin Citizen	30	15	4	11	52	43	+9	49	
8	Busan IPark Futures	30	12	7	11	51	40	+11	43	
9	FC Chungju	30	12	6	12	44	45	−1	42	
10	Pyeongtaek Citizen	30	10	10	10	55	54	+1	40	
11	Seoul Nowon United	30	10	5	15	49	60	−11	35	
12	Jeonju Citizen	30	8	10	12	45	46	−1	34	
13	Daejeon Hana Citizen B	30	8	6	16	37	62	−25	30	
14	Gangwon FC B	30	6	7	17	46	68	−22	25	
15	Seoul Jungnang	30	6	7	17	32	57	−25	25	
16	Sejong Vanesse	30	8	1	21	38	64	−26	25	

Source: JoinKFA
Rules for classification: 1) Points; 2) Goal difference; 3) Head-to-head points; 4) Goals scored; 5) Wins
(C) Champions; (P) Promoted

==== Promotion play-offs ====
First round			Final
			K3	Changwon City	2
3	Geoje Citizen	1	K4	Jinju Citizen	0
4	Jinju Citizen	4

=== WK League ===
==== Regular season ====
Pos	Team	Pld	W	D	L	GF	GA	GD	Pts	Qualification
1	Incheon Hyundai Steel Red Angels	21	13	3	5	36	14	+22	42	Qualification for play-offs final
2	Hwacheon KSPO	21	12	5	4	33	18	+15	41	Qualification for play-offs semi-final
3	Suwon FC	21	12	4	5	36	15	+21	40	Qualification for play-offs semi-final
4	Gyeongju KHNP	21	9	6	6	25	21	+4	33	
5	Sejong Sportstoto	21	6	4	11	27	33	−6	22	
6	Mungyeong Sangmu	21	5	6	10	20	38	−18	21	
7	Seoul WFC	21	4	7	10	22	38	−16	19	
8	Changnyeong WFC	21	3	5	13	15	37	−22	14	

Source: Soccerway

==== Championship play-offs ====
Semi-final			Final
			1	Incheon Hyundai Steel Red Angels	1	6	7
2	Hwacheon KSPO	1		Suwon FC	3	2	5
3	Suwon FC (a.e.t.)	2

==== Final table ====
Pos	Team	Qualification
1	Incheon Hyundai Steel Red Angels (C)	Qualification for Champions League
2	Suwon FC	
3	Hwacheon KSPO	

Source: Soccerway
(C) Champion

== Domestic cups ==
=== Korean FA Cup ===
Round of 16 (Fourth round)
Pohang Steelers	3
Seongnam FC	0
Gangwon FC	3
Gimpo FC	2
Jeju United	4
Daejeon Hana Citizen	3
Ulsan Hyundai (a.e.t.)	2
Jeonnam Dragons	1
Jeonbuk Hyundai Motors (a.e.t.)	5
Paju Citizen	2
Gwangju FC	1
Seoul E-Land	0
Incheon United	3
Gyeongnam FC	0
Suwon Samsung Bluewings	1
Daegu FC	0

Quarter-finals (Fifth round)
Pohang Steelers	2
Gangwon FC	1
Jeju United (p)	1 (6)
Ulsan Hyundai	1 (5)
Jeonbuk Hyundai Motors	4
Gwangju FC	0
Incheon United	3
Suwon Samsung Bluewings	2

Semi-finals (Sixth round)
Pohang Steelers (p)	1 (4)
Jeju United	1 (3)
Jeonbuk Hyundai Motors	3
Incheon United	1

Final (Seventh round)
Pohang Steelers	4
Jeonbuk Hyundai Motors	2

== International cups ==
=== AFC Champions League ===
The next rounds after the group stage were held in 2024.

Team	Result	Round	Aggregate	Score	Venue	Opponent
Incheon United	Group stage	Qualifying play-offs	3–1	3–1 (a.e.t.)	—	(Vietnam) Haiphong
Incheon United	Group stage	Group G	Third place	4–2	Away	(Japan) Yokohama F. Marinos
Incheon United	Group stage	Group G	Third place	2–1	Home	(Japan) Yokohama F. Marinos
Incheon United	Group stage	Group G	Third place	4–0	Home	(Philippines) Kaya–Iloilo
Incheon United	Group stage	Group G	Third place	3–1	Away	(Philippines) Kaya–Iloilo
Incheon United	Group stage	Group G	Third place	0–2	Home	(China) Shandong Taishan
Incheon United	Group stage	Group G	Third place	1–3	Away	(China) Shandong Taishan
Jeonbuk Hyundai Motors	Knockout stage	Group F	Runners-up	2–1	Home	(Hong Kong) Kitchee
Jeonbuk Hyundai Motors	Knockout stage	Group F	Runners-up	2–1	Away	(Hong Kong) Kitchee
Jeonbuk Hyundai Motors	Knockout stage	Group F	Runners-up	2–3	Away	(Thailand) Bangkok United
Jeonbuk Hyundai Motors	Knockout stage	Group F	Runners-up	3–2	Home	(Thailand) Bangkok United
Jeonbuk Hyundai Motors	Knockout stage	Group F	Runners-up	3–0	Home	(Singapore) Lion City Sailors
Jeonbuk Hyundai Motors	Knockout stage	Group F	Runners-up	0–2	Away	(Singapore) Lion City Sailors
Pohang Steelers	Knockout stage	Group J	Winners	4–2	Away	(Vietnam) Hanoi FC
Pohang Steelers	Knockout stage	Group J	Winners	2–0	Home	(Vietnam) Hanoi FC
Pohang Steelers	Knockout stage	Group J	Winners	3–1	Home	(China) Wuhan Three Towns
Pohang Steelers	Knockout stage	Group J	Winners	1–1	Away	(China) Wuhan Three Towns
Pohang Steelers	Knockout stage	Group J	Winners	2–0	Away	(Japan) Urawa Red Diamonds
Pohang Steelers	Knockout stage	Group J	Winners	2–1	Home	(Japan) Urawa Red Diamonds
Ulsan Hyundai	Knockout stage	Group I	Runners-up	3–1	Home	(Thailand) BG Pathum United
Ulsan Hyundai	Knockout stage	Group I	Runners-up	3–1	Away	(Thailand) BG Pathum United
Ulsan Hyundai	Knockout stage	Group I	Runners-up	0–1	Away	(Japan) Kawasaki Frontale
Ulsan Hyundai	Knockout stage	Group I	Runners-up	2–2	Home	(Japan) Kawasaki Frontale
Ulsan Hyundai	Knockout stage	Group I	Runners-up	3–1	Home	(Malaysia) Johor Darul Ta'zim
Ulsan Hyundai	Knockout stage	Group I	Runners-up	1–2	Away	(Malaysia) Johor Darul Ta'zim

== See also ==
- Football in South Korea
