= Venues of the 2022 Asian Games =

The 2022 Asian Games featured 51 competition venues on the sixteen-day Games competition from 22 September to 8 October 2023, after it had been rescheduled from 10 to 25 September 2022 due to the COVID-19 pandemic.

== Sporting venues ==
=== Hangzhou Olympic Expo Center ===
Venue	Sports	Capacity	Ref.	Coordinates
Aquatics Center	Artistic swimming, Diving, Swimming	6,000		
Squash Court	Squash	1,075 (main court)		30.229827,120.228987
Gymnasium	Basketball	18,000		
Main Stadium	Ceremonies, Athletics	80,000		30.231610,120.224459
Tennis Center	Tennis, Soft tennis	10,000 (centre court)		30.232466,120.234209

=== Binjiang District ===
Venue	Sports	Capacity	Ref.	
Binjiang Gymnasium	Badminton	3,900		30.197950,120.199267

=== Chun'an County ===
Venue	Sports	Capacity	Ref.	Location
Chun'an Jieshou Sports Centre	Cycling, Marathon swimming, Triathlon			29.549461,118.843853

=== Fuyang District ===
Venue	Sports	Capacity	Ref.	
Fuyang Water Sports Centre	Canoeing, Rowing	3,000		30.074492,120.007619
Fuyang Yinhu Sports Centre	Archery, Shooting, Modern pentathlon	10,531		30.128850,119.952700

=== Gongshu District ===
Venue	Sports	Capacity	Ref.	
Gongshu Canal Sports Park Field Hockey Field	Field hockey	4,870		30.319113,120.097374
Gongshu Canal Sports Park Gymnasium	Breaking, Table tennis	6,930		30.312850,120.101531
Hangzhou Gymnasium	Boxing	4,300		30.273046,120.168296
Hangzhou Esports Center	Esports	4,087		30.331886,120.177683

=== Lin'an District ===
Venue	Sports	Capacity	Ref.	Location
Lin'an Sports and Culture Centre	Taekwondo, Wrestling	3,728		30.202648,119.689395

=== Linping District ===
Venue	Sports	Capacity	Ref.	
Linping Sports Centre Gymnasium	Karate, Volleyball	3,340		30.416231,120.306004
Linping Sports Centre Stadium	Football	10,200		30.416423,120.307852

=== Qiantang District ===
Venue	Sports	Capacity	Ref.	
Hangzhou Dianzi University Arena	Fencing	4,599		30.317283,120.335436
Qiantang Roller Sports Centre	Roller sports	1,384		30.269072,120.351146
Sports Centre, Zhejiang Gongshang University	Handball	4,439		30.312350,120.378368

=== Shangcheng District ===
Venue	Sports	Capacity	Ref.
Hangzhou Chess Academy	Bridge, Chess, Go, Xiangqi	None	
Shangcheng Sports Centre Stadium	Football	13,544	

=== Tonglu County ===
Venue	Sports	Capacity	Ref.
Tonglu Equestrian Center	Equestrian	3,104	

=== Xiaoshan District ===
Venue	Sports	Capacity	Ref.	
Xiaoshan Guali Sports Centre	Kabaddi, Wushu	4,600		
Xiaoshan Linpu Gymnasium	Judo, Ju-jitsu, Kurash	2,700		
Xiaoshan Gymnasium, Zhejiang Normal University	Handball	2,302		30.254453,120.311027
Xiaoshan Sports Center Gymnasium	Weightlifting	1,901		30.157535,120.262405
Xiaoshan Sports Center Stadium	Football	10,118		30.155757,120.262056

=== Xihu District ===
Venue	Sports	Capacity	Ref.	Location
Pingfeng Campus Cricket Field, Zhejiang University of Technology	Cricket	1,347		30.228509,120.031297
West Lake Golf Course	Golf	__		
Huanglong Swimming Center	Water polo	2,938		30.271537,120.129654
Huanglong Gymnasium	Gymnastics	8,000		30.270313,120.130460
Huanglong Sports Centre Stadium	Football (including men's and women's finals)	51,971		30.268401,120.128896
Zijingang Campus Gymnasium, Zhejiang University	Basketball	5,280		30.308573,120.084696

=== Yuhang District ===
Venue	Sports	Capacity	Ref.
Cangqian Athletics Field, Hangzhou Normal University	Rugby sevens	12,000	
Cangqian Campus Gymnasium, Hangzhou Normal University	Volleyball	7,105	

=== Outside Hangzhou ===
Venue	City	Sports	Capacity	Location	Ref.
Deqing Sports Center Gymnasium	Deqing	Volleyball	3,000	30.545072,119.993285	
Deqing Geographic Information Park	Deqing	Basketball 3×3	1,500	30.515289,119.969784	
Zhejiang Normal University East Stadium	Jinhua	Football	11,349	29.139208,119.644466	
Jinhua Sports Center Gymnasium	Jinhua	Sepak takraw	4,570	29.046665,119.639989	
Jinhua Stadium	Jinhua	Football	29,800	29.043593,119.638453	
Banbianshan Beach	Ningbo	Beach volleyball	3,000	29.261739,121.962921	
Xiangshan Sailing Centre	Ningbo	Sailing	None	29.451204,121.985075	
Shaoxing Baseball & Softball Sports Center	Shaoxing	Baseball, Softball	5,000 (main baseball field) 2,500 (backup baseball field) 2,000 (main softball field) 500 (backup softball field)	30.081308,120.521596	
Shaoxing Olympic Center Gymnasium	Shaoxing	Basketball	9,550	30.057139,120.570722	
China Textile City Sports Center Gymnasium	Shaoxing	Volleyball	3,666	30.101786,120.493364	
Keqiao Yangshan Sport Climbing Centre	Shaoxing	Sport climbing	2,100	30.116889,120.536083	
Wenzhou Dragon Boat Centre	Wenzhou	Dragon boat	10,500	27.961112,120.603222	
Wenzhou Olympic Sports Center Stadium	Wenzhou	Football	50,000	27.921403,120.802992	
Wenzhou Sports Center Stadium	Wenzhou	Football	14,589	28.004287,120.672483	
