= Football at the 2022 Asian Games – Men's tournament =

Men's Football Tournament at the 2022 Asian Games

Tournament details
- Host country: China
- Dates: 19 September – 7 October 2023
- Teams: 21
- Venues: 6 (in 2 host cities)

Final positions
- Champions: South Korea (3rd title)
- Runners-up: Japan
- Third place: Uzbekistan
- Fourth place: Hong Kong

Tournament statistics
- Matches played: 45
- Goals scored: 123 (2.73 per match)
- Attendance: 605,268 (13,450 per match)
- Top scorer(s): (South Korea) Jeong Woo-yeong (8 goals)

The men's football tournament at the 2022 Asian Games was held from 19 September to 7 October 2023 in Hangzhou, China.

== Competition schedule ==
All times are local China Standard Time (UTC+8).

G	Group stage	1/8	Round of 16	1/4	Quarter-finals	1/2	Semi-finals	B	Bronze medal match	F	Gold medal match

Date Event	Tue 19	Wed 20	Thu 21	Fri 22	Sat 23	Sun 24	Mon 25	Tue 26	Wed 27	Thu 28	Fri 29	Sat 30	Sun 1	Mon 2	Tue 3	Wed 4	Thu 5	Fri 6	Sat 7	
Men	G					G			1/8				1/4			1/2			B	F

== Venues ==
Six venues were used during the tournament, two of them outside of Hangzhou at cities around Zhejiang. Huanglong Sports Centre Stadium hosted the final.

Hangzhou				Jinhua	
Xihu	Shangcheng	Linping	Xiaoshan	Wucheng	
Huanglong Sports Centre Stadium	Shangcheng Sports Centre Stadium	Linping Sports Center Stadium	Xiaoshan Sports Centre Stadium	Jinhua Stadium	Zhejiang Normal University East Stadium
Capacity: 51,971	Capacity: 13,500	Capacity: 10,200	Capacity: 10,118	Capacity: 29,800	Capacity: 12,273
Map of Zhejiang with 2022 Football of Asian Games venues marked.

== Draw ==
The draw for the tournament was held on 27 July 2023. The teams were seeded into four pots based on their performances in the previous Asian Games in 2018. The hosts China were automatically assigned into position A1.

Pot 1	Pot 2	Pot 3	Pot 4
1. China (hosts); 2. South Korea; 3. Japan; 4. Vietnam; 5. Uzbekistan; 6. North Korea	7. ~~Syria~~ (withdrew); 8. Saudi Arabia; 9. Palestine; 10. Indonesia; 11. Bangladesh; 12. Bahrain	13. Hong Kong; 14. Iran; 15. Thailand; 16. Myanmar; 17. Kyrgyzstan; 18. Qatar	19. Chinese Taipei; 20. India; 21. Mongolia; 22. ~~Afghanistan~~ (withdrew); 23. Kuwait

== Squads ==
Each nation must submit a squad of between 18 and 22 players, whom must be born on or after 1 January 1999, and three of whom can be older dispensation players are eligible to compete in the tournament.

== Referees ==
- (Australia) Alex King
- (Bahrain) Ammar Mahfoodh
- (Bhutan) Virendha Rai
- (China) Shen Yinhao
- (Indonesia) Thoriq Alkatiri
- (Iran) Hasan Akrami
- (Iraq) Yousif Saeed Hasan
- (Japan) Yudai Yamamoto
- (Jordan) Ahmad Yacoub Ibrahim
- (South Korea) Kim Hee-gon
- (Kuwait) Ammar Ashkanani
- (Kyrgyzstan) Daiyrbek Abdyldaev
- (Lebanon) Ali Reda
- (Malaysia) Nazmi Nasaruddin
- (Maldives) Mohamed Javiz
- (Palestine) Baraa Abu Aisha
- (Philippines) Clifford Daypuyat
- (Qatar) Mohammed Ahmed Al-Shammari
- (Oman) Qasim Al-Hatmi
- (Saudi Arabia) Khalid Al-Turais
- (Syria) Feras Taweel
- (Tajikistan) Sayodjon Zainiddinov
- (Thailand) Mongkolchai Pechsri
- (Uzbekistan) Rustam Lutfullin
- (Vietnam) Ngô Duy Lân
- (Singapore) Jansen Foo

== Group stage ==
The top two teams in each group, and the top four third-placed teams among six groups advance to the round of 16. Syria and Afghanistan were initially assigned to Group C, but they withdrew from the tournament after the draw, leaving the group with only two teams left.

All times are local, CST (UTC+8).

=== Tiebreakers ===
Teams in a group are ranked according to points (3 points for a win, 1 point for a draw, 0 points for a loss), and if tied on points, the following tiebreaking criteria are applied, in the order given, to determine the rankings.

1. Highest number of points obtained in all group matches;
2. Highest number of points obtained in the group matches between the teams concerned;
3. Goal difference resulting from the group matches between the teams concerned;
4. Highest number of goals scored from all group matches between the teams concerned;
5. If two or more teams have equal ranking with the criteria so far, reapply the criteria above only for them. If this re-application gives no more ranking, apply the following criteria.
6. Goal difference in all group matches;
7. Highest number of goals scored in all group matches;
8. Kicks from the penalty mark only if two (2) teams are involved and they are both on the field of play.
9. Fewer points of yellow/red cards in all group matches (only one of these deductions shall be applied to a player in a single match):
  - First yellow card: 1 point;
  - Indirect red card (second yellow card): 3 points;
  - Direct red card: 3 points;
  - Yellow card followed by direct red card: 4 points;
10. Drawing of lots

Third-placed teams from the six groups are ranked according to the following criteria, after the result against the fourth-placed teams in four-team groups are excluded in order to rank them with the same numbers of matches.

1. Highest number of points obtained in all group matches;
2. Goal difference in all group matches;
3. Highest number of goals scored in all group matches;
4. Fewer points of yellow/red cards in all group matches (only one of these deductions shall be applied to a player in a single match):
  - First yellow card: 1 point;
  - Indirect red card (second yellow card): 3 points;
  - Direct red card: 3 points;
  - Yellow card followed by direct red card: 4 points;
5. Drawing of lots

=== Group A ===
Pos	Team	Pld	W	D	L	GF	GA	GD	Pts	Qualification
1	China (H)	3	2	1	0	9	1	+8	7	Knockout stage
2	India	3	1	1	1	3	6	−3	4	Knockout stage
3	Myanmar	3	1	1	1	2	5	−3	4	Knockout stage
4	Bangladesh	3	0	1	2	0	2	−2	1	

Source: Football – Men – Groups
Rules for classification: Group stage tiebreakers
(H) Hosts
19 September 2023
16:00

Bangladesh	0–1	Myanmar
	Report	Hasan 69' (o.g.)

Xiaoshan Sports Centre Stadium, Hangzhou
Attendance: 3,087
Referee: Daiyrbek Abdyldaev (Kyrgyzstan)
19 September 2023
19:30

China	5–1	India
Gao Tianyi 17'; Dai Wai Tsun 51'; Tao Qianglong 72', 75'; Fang Hao 90+2'	Report	Rahul K.P. 45'

Huanglong Sports Centre Stadium, Hangzhou
Attendance: 34,513
Referee: Thoriq Alkatiri (Indonesia)

21 September 2023
16:00

India	1–0	Bangladesh
Sunil Chhetri 85' (pen.)	Report

Xiaoshan Sports Centre Stadium, Hangzhou
Attendance: 5,232
Referee: Clifford Daypuyat (Philippines)
21 September 2023
19:30

Myanmar	0–4	China
	Report	Tan Long 15', 19'; Wang Zhen'ao 22'; Dai Wai Tsun 44'

Huanglong Sports Centre Stadium, Hangzhou
Attendance: 36,888
Referee: Ammar Mahfoodh (Bahrain)

24 September 2023
19:30

China	0–0	Bangladesh
	Report

Huanglong Sports Centre Stadium, Hangzhou
Attendance: 36,918
Referee: Mongkolchai Pechsri (Thailand)
24 September 2023
19:30

Myanmar	1–1	India
Yan Kyaw Htwe 74'	Report	Sunil Chhetri 23' (pen.)

Xiaoshan Sports Centre Stadium, Hangzhou
Attendance: 6,315
Referee: Qasim Al-Hatmi (Oman)

=== Group B ===
Pos	Team	Pld	W	D	L	GF	GA	GD	Pts	Qualification
1	Iran	3	2	1	0	7	0	+7	7	Knockout stage
2	Saudi Arabia	3	2	1	0	6	1	+5	7	Knockout stage
3	Vietnam	3	1	0	2	5	9	−4	3	
4	Mongolia	3	0	0	3	2	10	−8	0	

Source: Football – Men – Groups
Rules for classification: Group stage tiebreakers
19 September 2023
16:00

Vietnam	4–2	Mongolia
Nguyễn Quốc Việt 3', 32'; Khuất Văn Khang 43'; Võ Nguyên Hoàng 65'	Report	Uuganbat 46'; Batmönkh 90+6'

Linping Sports Centre Stadium, Hangzhou
Attendance: 3,300
Referee: Shen Yinhao (China)
19 September 2023
19:30

Saudi Arabia	0–0	Iran
	Report

Linping Sports Centre Stadium, Hangzhou
Attendance: 5,580
Referee: Rustam Lutfullin (Uzbekistan)

21 September 2023
16:00

Mongolia	0–3	Saudi Arabia
	Report	Asiri 18'; Maran 50'; Masoud 74'

Linping Sports Centre Stadium, Hangzhou
Attendance: 4,980
Referee: Virendha Rai (Bhutan)
21 September 2023
19:30

Iran	4–0	Vietnam
Motahari 4'; Touranian 47'; Mamizadeh 52'; Barzegar 90+2'	Report

Linping Sports Centre Stadium, Hangzhou
Attendance: 6,194
Referee: Mohammed Ahmed Al-Shammari (Qatar)

24 September 2023
19:30

Vietnam	1–3	Saudi Arabia
Abu Al-Shamat 90+4' (o.g.)	Report	Eisa 43'; Maran 87'; Hawsawi 90'

Linping Sports Centre Stadium, Hangzhou
Attendance: 7,008
Referee: Ammar Mahfoodh (Bahrain)
24 September 2023
19:30

Iran	3–0	Mongolia
Mamizadeh 1'; Omri 45+1'; Barzegar 57'	Report

Shangcheng Sports Centre Stadium, Hangzhou
Attendance: 8,692
Referee: Thoriq Alkatiri (Indonesia)

=== Group C ===
Pos	Team	Pld	W	D	L	GF	GA	GD	Pts	Qualification
1	Uzbekistan	2	2	0	0	3	1	+2	6	Knockout stage
2	Hong Kong	2	0	0	2	1	3	−2	0	Knockout stage
3	Syria	0	0	0	0	0	0	0	0	Withdrew
4	Afghanistan	0	0	0	0	0	0	0	0	Withdrew

Source: Football – Men – Groups
Rules for classification: Group stage tiebreakers
22 September 2023
19:30

Hong Kong	0–1	Uzbekistan
	Report	Khoshimov 65'

Shangcheng Sports Centre Stadium, Hangzhou
Attendance: 7,638
Referee: Ngô Duy Lân (Vietnam)

25 September 2023
16:00

Uzbekistan	2–1	Hong Kong
Davronov 64'; Jaloliddinov 70'	Report	Li Ngai Hoi 4'

Shangcheng Sports Centre Stadium, Hangzhou
Attendance: 8,784
Referee: Jansen Foo (Singapore)

=== Group D ===
Pos	Team	Pld	W	D	L	GF	GA	GD	Pts	Qualification
1	Japan	2	2	0	0	4	1	+3	6	Knockout stage
2	Palestine	2	0	1	1	0	1	−1	1	Knockout stage
3	Qatar	2	0	1	1	1	3	−2	1	Knockout stage

Source: Football – Men – Groups
Rules for classification: Group stage tiebreakers
20 September 2023
19:30

Japan	3–1	Qatar
Yachida 2'; Uchino 25'; Yamasaki 88'	Report	Al Sulaiti 79'

Xiaoshan Sports Centre Stadium, Hangzhou
Attendance: 5,904
Referee: Kim Hee-gon (South Korea)

22 September 2023
19:30

Qatar	0–0	Palestine
	Report

Xiaoshan Sports Centre Stadium, Hangzhou
Attendance: 6,475
Referee: Ammar Ashkanani (Kuwait)

25 September 2023
19:30

Palestine	0–1	Japan
	Report	Yachida 22'

Xiaoshan Sports Centre Stadium, Hangzhou
Attendance: 6,417
Referee: Nazmi Nasaruddin (Malaysia)

=== Group E ===
Pos	Team	Pld	W	D	L	GF	GA	GD	Pts	Qualification
1	South Korea	3	3	0	0	16	0	+16	9	Knockout stage
2	Bahrain	3	0	2	1	2	5	−3	2	Knockout stage
3	Thailand	3	0	2	1	2	6	−4	2	Knockout stage
4	Kuwait	3	0	2	1	2	11	−9	2	

Source: Football – Men – Groups
Rules for classification: Group stage tiebreakers
19 September 2023
16:00

Bahrain	1–1	Thailand
Abdulkarim 42'	Report	Purachet 90+5'

Jinhua Stadium, Jinhua
Attendance: 2,048
Referee: Sayodjon Zainiddinov (Tajikistan)
19 September 2023
19:30

South Korea	9–0	Kuwait
Jeong Woo-yeong 3', 45', 48'; Cho Young-wook 19', 74'; Paik Seung-ho 44'; Um Won-sang 52'; Park Jae-yong 80'; An Jae-jun 90+6'	Report

Jinhua Stadium, Jinhua
Attendance: 2,936
Referee: Hasan Akrami (Iran)

21 September 2023
16:00

Kuwait	1–1	Bahrain
Al-Awadi 74'	Report	Redha 52'

Jinhua Stadium, Jinhua
Attendance: 1,250
Referee: Yudai Yamamoto (Japan)
21 September 2023
19:30

Thailand	0–4	South Korea
	Report	Hong Hyun-seok 15'; An Jae-jun 20'; Um Won-sang 39'; Lee Jae-ik 45+1'

Jinhua Stadium, Jinhua
Attendance: 3,166
Referee: Ahmad Yacoub Ibrahim (Jordan)

24 September 2023
19:30

South Korea	3–0	Bahrain
Lee Han-beom 61'; Paik Seung-ho 74'; Goh Young-jun 84'	Report

Jinhua Stadium, Jinhua
Attendance: 19,084
Referee: Yousif Saeed Hasan (Iraq)
24 September 2023
19:30

Thailand	1–1	Kuwait
Jakkapong 9'	Report	Al-Haqqan 90'

Zhejiang Normal University East Stadium, Jinhua
Attendance: 2,419
Referee: Alex King (Australia)

=== Group F ===
Pos	Team	Pld	W	D	L	GF	GA	GD	Pts	Qualification
1	North Korea	3	3	0	0	4	0	+4	9	Knockout stage
2	Kyrgyzstan	3	1	0	2	4	4	0	3 (Note: Head-to-head goal differences: Kyrgyzstan 4–3, Indonesia 2–1, Chinese Taipei 2–4)	Knockout stage
3	Indonesia	3	1	0	2	2	2	0	3	Knockout stage
4	Chinese Taipei	3	1	0	2	2	6	−4	3	

Source: Football – Men – Groups
Rules for classification: Group stage tierbreakers
Notes:
19 September 2023
16:00

North Korea	2–0	Chinese Taipei
Ri Jo-guk 7'; Kim Kuk-jin 12'	Report

Zhejiang Normal University East Stadium, Jinhua
Attendance: 1,248
Referee: Yousif Saeed Hasan (Iraq)
19 September 2023
19:30

Indonesia	2–0	Kyrgyzstan
Rumakiek 58'; Samir 90+2'	Report

Zhejiang Normal University East Stadium, Jinhua
Attendance: 1,445
Referee: Baraa Abu Aisha (Palestine)

21 September 2023
16:00

Chinese Taipei	1–0	Indonesia
Chin Wen-yen 47'	Report

Zhejiang Normal University East Stadium, Jinhua
Attendance: 894
Referee: Mohamed Javiz (Maldives)
21 September 2023
19:30

Kyrgyzstan	0–1	North Korea
	Report	Kim Kuk-jin 20'

Zhejiang Normal University East Stadium, Jinhua
Attendance: 1,235
Referee: Ali Reda (Lebanon)

24 September 2023
16:00

Kyrgyzstan	4–1	Chinese Taipei
Abilov 45+2'; Huang Tzu-Ming 55' (o.g.); Toktosunov 62'; Sharshenbekov 90+1'	Report	Chen Po-Liang 34' (pen.)

Jinhua Stadium, Jinhua
Attendance: 16,973
Referee: Feras Taweel (Syria)
24 September 2023
16:00

North Korea	1–0	Indonesia
Kim Yu-song 40'	Report

Zhejiang Normal University East Stadium, Jinhua
Attendance: 7,288
Referee: Khalid Al-Turais (Saudi Arabia)

=== Ranking of best third place ===
Due to groups having different numbers of teams, the results against the fourth-placed teams in four-team groups were not considered for this ranking. Due to group C only having two teams, their results would not be included here.

Pos	Grp	Team	Pld	W	D	L	GF	GA	GD	Pts	Qualification
1	F	Indonesia	2	1	0	1	2	1	+1	3	Knockout stage
2	D	Qatar	2	0	1	1	1	3	−2	1	Knockout stage
3	E	Thailand	2	0	1	1	1	5	−4	1	Knockout stage
4	A	Myanmar	2	0	1	1	1	5	−4	1	Knockout stage
5	B	Vietnam	2	0	0	2	1	7	−6	0	

Source: Football – Men – Groups

== Knockout stage ==
=== Bracket ===
Round of 16
27 September – Xihu
China	1
Qatar	0
27 September – Wucheng
South Korea	5
Kyrgyzstan	1
28 September – Shangcheng
Uzbekistan (a.e.t.)	2
Indonesia	0
28 September – Xihu
India	0
Saudi Arabia	2
27 September – Shangcheng
Iran	2
Thailand	0
27 September – Xiaoshan
Hong Kong	1
Palestine	0
28 September – Xiaoshan
Japan	7
Myanmar	0
27 September – Lanxi
North Korea	2
Bahrain	0

Quarter-finals
1 October – Xihu
China	0
South Korea	2
1 October – Xihu
Uzbekistan	2
Saudi Arabia	1
1 October – Shangcheng
Iran	0
Hong Kong	1
1 October – Xiaoshan
Japan	2
North Korea	1

Semi-finals
4 October – Xihu
South Korea	2
Uzbekistan	1
4 October – Xiaoshan
Hong Kong	0
Japan	4

Final
7 October – Xihu
South Korea	2
Japan	1
Bronze medal match
7 October – Shangcheng
Uzbekistan	4
Hong Kong	0

=== Round of 16 ===
27 September 2023
16:30 UTC+8

Iran	2–0	Thailand
Motahari 15'; Salmani 82' (pen.)	Report

Shangcheng Sports Centre Stadium, Hangzhou
Attendance: 9,410
Referee: Nazmi Nasaruddin (Malaysia)

27 September 2023
16:30 UTC+8

North Korea	2–0	Bahrain
Kang Kuk-chol 45+5'; Kim Kuk-bom 63'	Report

Zhejiang Normal University East Stadium, Jinhua
Attendance: 7,321
Referee: Adel Al Naqbi (United Arab Emirates)

27 September 2023
19:30 UTC+8

China	1–0	Qatar
Tao Qianglong 3'	Report

Huanglong Sports Centre Stadium, Hangzhou
Attendance: 38,027
Referee: Rustam Lutfullin (Uzbekistan)

27 September 2023
19:30 UTC+8

Hong Kong	1–0	Palestine
Orr 48'	Report

Xiaoshan Sports Centre Stadium, Hangzhou
Attendance: 7,219
Referee: Kim Hee-gon (South Korea)

27 September 2023
19:30 UTC+8

South Korea	5–1	Kyrgyzstan
Paik Seung-ho 11' (pen.); Jeong Woo-yeong 12', 74' (pen.); Cho Young-wook 79'; Hong Hyun-seok 85'	Report	Alygulov 28'

Jinhua Stadium, Jinhua
Attendance: 18,393
Referee: Alex King (Australia)

28 September 2023
16:30 UTC+8

Uzbekistan	2–0 (a.e.t.)	Indonesia
Esanov 92', 120+1'	Report

Shangcheng Sports Centre Stadium, Hangzhou
Attendance: 9,466
Referee: Mohammed Ahmed Al-Shammari (Qatar)

28 September 2023
19:30 UTC+8

India	0–2	Saudi Arabia
	Report	Maran 52', 58'

Huanglong Sports Centre Stadium, Hangzhou
Attendance: 37,066
Referee: Shen Yinhao (China)

28 September 2023
19:30 UTC+8

Japan	7–0	Myanmar
Sato 12', 27'; Ayukawa 26', 35'; Sumi 42'; Uchino 66'; Hino 73'	Report

Xiaoshan Sports Centre Stadium, Hangzhou
Attendance: 7,217
Referee: Clifford Daypuyat (Philippines)

=== Quarter-finals ===
1 October 2023
15:00 UTC+8

Uzbekistan	2–1	Saudi Arabia
Mirsaidov 24'; Odilov 43'	Report	Maran 66'

Huanglong Sports Centre Stadium, Hangzhou
Attendance: 38,088
Referee: Ammar Mahfoodh (Bahrain)

1 October 2023
19:30 UTC+8

Iran	0–1	Hong Kong
	Report	Poon Pui Hin 47'

Shangcheng Sports Centre Stadium, Hangzhou
Attendance: 10,198
Referee: Kim Hee-gon (South Korea)

1 October 2023
19:30 UTC+8

Japan	2–1	North Korea
Uchino 50'; Matsumura 80' (pen.)	Report	Kim Kuk-bom 74'

Xiaoshan Sports Centre Stadium, Hangzhou
Attendance: 7,476
Referee: Rustam Lutfullin (Uzbekistan)

1 October 2023
20:00 UTC+8

China	0–2	South Korea
	Report	Hong Hyun-seok 18'; Song Min-kyu 35'

Huanglong Sports Centre Stadium, Hangzhou
Attendance: 38,158
Referee: Qasim Al-Hatmi (Oman)

=== Semi-finals ===
4 October 2023
18:00 UTC+8

Hong Kong	0–4	Japan
	Report	Ayukawa 23'; Hino 54', 86'; Komi 74'

Xiaoshan Sports Centre Stadium, Hangzhou
Attendance: 7,456
Referee: Qasim Al-Hatmi (Oman)

4 October 2023
20:00 UTC+8

South Korea	2–1	Uzbekistan
Jeong Woo-yeong 3', 38'	Report	Jaloliddinov 25'

Huanglong Sports Centre Stadium, Hangzhou
Attendance: 38,019
Referee: Ammar Ashkanani (Kuwait)

=== Bronze medal match ===
7 October 2023
16:00 UTC+8

(bronze) Uzbekistan	4–0	Hong Kong
Odilov 43'; Norchaev 50', 59'; Davronov 75'	Report

Shangcheng Sports Centre Stadium, Hangzhou
Attendance: 9,825
Referee: Ngô Duy Lân (Vietnam)

=== Final ===
7 October 2023
20:00 UTC+8

(gold) South Korea	2–1	Japan (silver)
Jeong Woo-yeong 27'; Cho Young-wook 56'	Report	Uchino 2'

Huanglong Sports Centre Stadium, Hangzhou
Attendance: 38,018
Referee: Ammar Mahfoodh (Bahrain)

== Final standing ==
Rank	Team	Pld	W	D	L	GF	GA	GD	Pts
1st place, gold medalist(s)	South Korea	7	7	0	0	27	3	+24	21
2nd place, silver medalist(s)	Japan	6	5	0	1	18	4	+14	15
3rd place, bronze medalist(s)	Uzbekistan	6	5	0	1	12	4	+8	15
4	Hong Kong	6	2	0	4	3	11	–8	6
Eliminated in the Quarter-finals
5	North Korea	5	4	0	1	7	2	+5	12
6	Iran	5	3	1	1	9	1	+8	10
7	China	5	3	1	1	10	3	+7	10
8	Saudi Arabia	5	3	1	1	9	3	+6	10
Eliminated in the Round of 16
9	India	4	1	1	2	3	8	–5	4
10	Myanmar	4	1	1	2	2	12	–10	4
11	Indonesia	4	1	0	3	2	4	–2	3
12	Kyrgyzstan	4	1	0	3	5	9	–4	3
13	Bahrain	4	0	2	2	2	7	–5	2
14	Thailand	4	0	2	2	2	8	–6	2
15	Palestine	3	0	1	2	0	2	–2	1
16	Qatar	3	0	1	2	1	4	–3	1
Eliminated in the group stage
17	Vietnam	3	1	0	2	5	9	–4	3
18	Chinese Taipei	3	1	0	2	2	6	–4	3
19	Kuwait	3	0	2	1	2	11	–9	2
20	Bangladesh	3	0	1	2	0	2	–2	1
21	Mongolia	3	0	0	3	2	10	–8	0

== Goalscorers ==
There were 123 goals scored in 45 matches, for an average of 2.73 goals per match.

8 goals

- (South Korea) Jeong Woo-yeong

5 goals

- (Saudi Arabia) Mohammed Maran

4 goals

- (Japan) Kotaro Uchino
- (South Korea) Cho Young-wook

3 goals

- (China) Tao Qianglong
- (Japan) Shun Ayukawa
- (Japan) Shota Hino
- (South Korea) Hong Hyun-seok
- (South Korea) Paik Seung-ho

2 goals

- (Iran) Aria Barzegar
- (Iran) Mehdi Mamizadeh
- (Iran) Arsalan Motahari
- (China) Dai Wai Tsun
- (China) Tan Long
- (India) Sunil Chhetri
- (Japan) Kein Sato
- (Japan) Teppei Yachida
- (North Korea) Kim Kuk-bom
- (North Korea) Kim Kuk-jin
- (South Korea) An Jae-jun
- (South Korea) Um Won-sang
- (Uzbekistan) Alibek Davronov
- (Uzbekistan) Sherzod Esanov
- (Uzbekistan) Jasurbek Jaloliddinov
- (Uzbekistan) Khusayin Norchaev
- (Uzbekistan) Alisher Odilov
- (Vietnam) Nguyễn Quốc Việt

1 goal

- (Bahrain) Husain Abdulkarim
- (Bahrain) Ali Mohamed Redha
- (China) Fang Hao
- (China) Gao Tianyi
- (China) Wang Zhen'ao
- (Chinese Taipei) Chen Po-Liang
- (Chinese Taipei) Chin Wen-Yen
- (Hong Kong) Li Ngai Hoi
- (Hong Kong) Matt Orr
- (Hong Kong) Poon Pui Hin
- (India) Rahul K P
- (Indonesia) Ramai Rumakiek
- (Indonesia) Hugo Samir
- (Iran) Mohammad Omri
- (Iran) Yasin Salmani
- (Iran) Saman Touranian
- (Japan) Yota Komi
- (Japan) Yuta Matsumura
- (Japan) Koshiro Sumi
- (Japan) Taichi Yamasaki
- (Kuwait) Salman Al-Awadi
- (Kuwait) Youssef Al-Haqqan
- (Kyrgyzstan) Ernaz Abilov
- (Kyrgyzstan) Maksat Alygulov
- (Kyrgyzstan) Arsen Sharshenbekov
- (Kyrgyzstan) Dastanbek Toktosunov
- (Mongolia) Baljinnyam Batmönkh
- (Mongolia) Temulen Uuganbat
- (Myanmar) Yan Kyaw Htwe
- (North Korea) Kang Kuk-chol
- (North Korea) Kim Yu-song
- (North Korea) Ri Jo-guk
- (Qatar) Abdulla Al Sulaiti
- (Saudi Arabia) Haitham Asiri
- (Saudi Arabia) Mohammed Eisa
- (Saudi Arabia) Zakaria Hawsawi
- (Saudi Arabia) Naif Masoud
- (South Korea) Goh Young-jun
- (South Korea) Lee Han-beom
- (South Korea) Lee Jae-ik
- (South Korea) Park Jae-yong
- (South Korea) Song Min-kyu
- (Thailand) Jakkapong Sanmahung
- (Thailand) Purachet Thodsanit
- (Uzbekistan) Ulugbek Khoshimov
- (Uzbekistan) Saidazamat Mirsaidov
- (Vietnam) Khuất Văn Khang
- (Vietnam) Võ Nguyên Hoàng

1 own goal

- (Bangladesh) Hasan Murad Tipu (against Myanmar)
- (Chinese Taipei) Huang Tzu-Ming (against Kyrgyzstan)
- (Saudi Arabia) Saleh Abu Al-Shamat (against Vietnam)

== See also ==
- Football at the 2022 Asian Games – Women's tournament
