= Thoriq Alkatiri =

Indonesian football referee

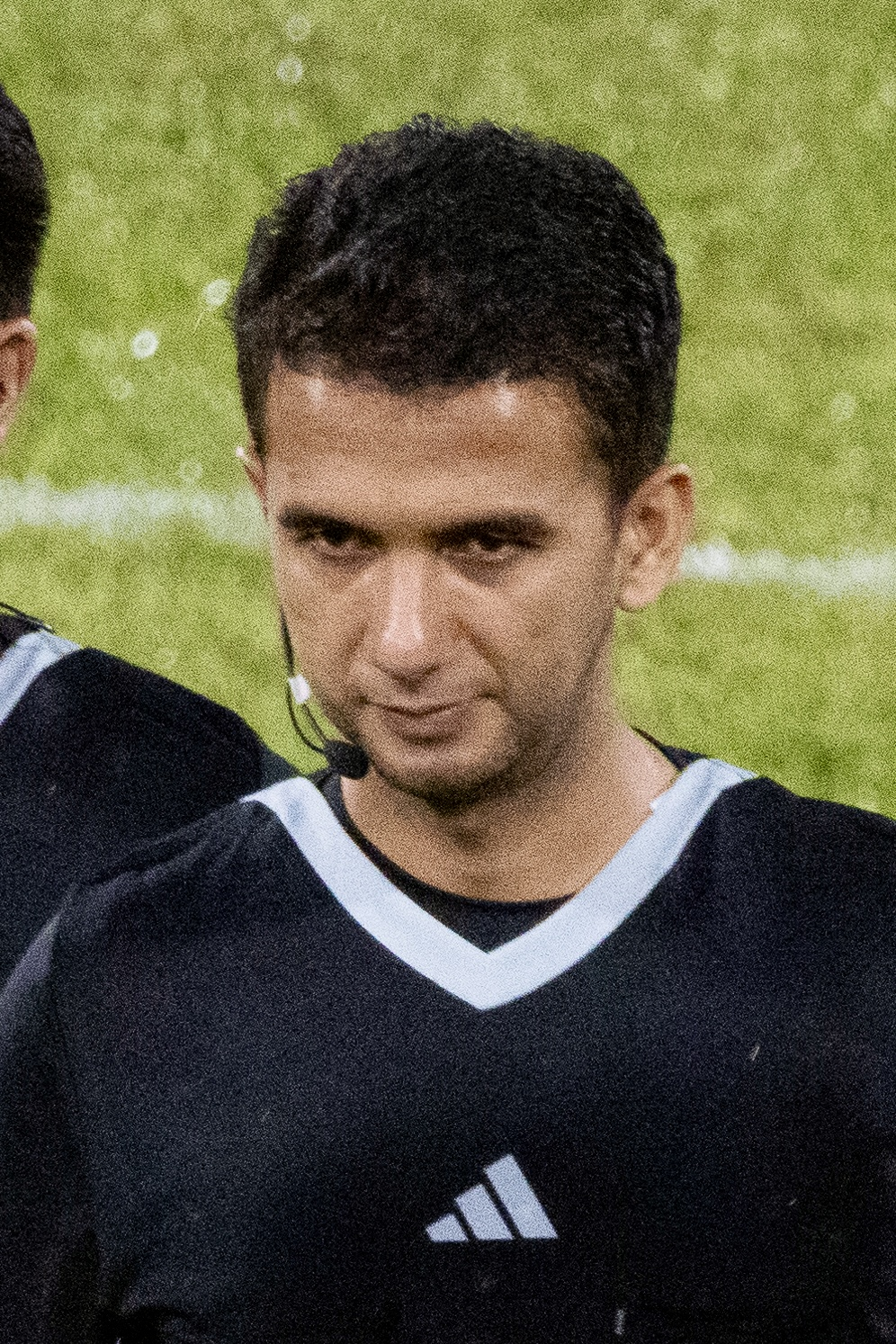
- Full name: Thoriq Munir Alkatiri
- Born: 19 November 1988 (age 37); Purwakarta, West Java, Indonesia

Domestic
Years	League	Role
2013–	Indonesian Super League	Referee

International
Years	League	Role
2014–	FIFA listed	Referee

Thoriq Munir Alkatiri (born 19 November 1988) is an Indonesian professional football referee. He has been a full international for FIFA since 2014.

== Career ==
Thoriq has refereed in the Indonesia Super League (now Liga 1) since 2013, being promoted to the FIFA international referee list in 2014. He officiated numerous matches in the AFC Champions League and the AFC Cup, as a fourth official.

In April 2019, he officiated his first 2019 AFC Cup match, the group stage tie between Al-Qadsia and Malkiya.

He was appointed to referee three matches at 2019 Pacific Games in Samoa, the group stage clashes between Papua New Guinea and Vanuatu, Tahiti and New Caledonia, and bronze medal match between Papua New Guinea and Fiji which Fiji won after penalties.

== Record ==
=== Major national team competitions ===
FIFA World Cup qualification
Date	Match	Venue	Location	Round	Result	Yellow cards	Red cards
10 October 2019	Australia – Nepal	Canberra Stadium	Canberra	Group stage	5–0	1	0
17 October 2023	Bhutan – Hong Kong	Changlimithang Stadium	Thimphu	Qualifying round	2–0	3	0
2022 Asian Games
19 September 2023	China – India	Huanglong Sports Center	Hangzhou	Group stage	5–1	4	0
24 September 2023	Iran – Mongolia	Shangcheng Sports Centre Stadium	Hangzhou	Group stage	3–0	4	1
2019 Pacific Games
10 July 2019	Papua New Guinea – Vanuatu	Toleafoa J. S. Blatter Soccer Stadium	Apia	Group stage	2–0	5	1
15 July 2019	Tahiti – New Caledonia	Toleafoa J. S. Blatter Soccer Stadium	Apia	Group stage	0–3	2	0
20 July 2019	Papua New Guinea – Fiji	Toleafoa J. S. Blatter Soccer Stadium	Apia	Bronze medal	1–1 (2–4 p)	6	1
2023 AFC Asian Cup qualification
26 November 2022	Uzbekistan – Sri Lanka	Pakhtakor Central Stadium	Tashkent	Group stage	3–0	1	0
2022 AFC U-23 Asian Cup qualification
27 October 2021	Kyrgyzstan – Oman	Fujairah Club Stadium	Fujairah	Group stage	0–1	4	1
2023 AFC U-20 Asian Cup qualification
11 September 2022	Bangladesh – Bahrain	Al Muharraq Stadium	Arad	Group stage	0–0	2	0
17 September 2022	Bahrain – Bhutan	Al Muharraq Stadium	Arad	Group stage	2–1	5	0
2023 AFC U-17 Asian Cup
19 June 2023	Afghanistan – South Korea	Pathum Thani Stadium	Pathum Thani	Group stage	0–4	5	0
23 June 2023	Tajikistan – Australia	Rajamangala Stadium	Bangkok	Group stage	0–2	2	0
2018 AFF Championship
8 November 2018	Laos – Vietnam	New Laos National Stadium	Vientiane	Group stage	0–3	1	0
2019 AFF U-23 Championship
19 February 2019	Philippines – Thailand	Olympic Stadium	Phnom Penh	Group stage	0–3	2	0
2024 ASEAN Championship
8 October 2024	Brunei – Timor-Leste	Hassanal Bolkiah National Stadium	Bandar Seri Begawan	Qualification	0–1	4	0
2025 AFC U-20 Asian Cup
15 February 2025	Kyrgyzstan – China	Bao'an Stadium	Shenzhen	Group stage	2–5	11	1
20 February 2025	Syria – Thailand	Longhua Cultural and Sports Center	Shenzhen	Group stage	2–2	5	1
2025 EAFF E-1 Football Championship
8 July 2025	Japan – Hong Kong	Yongin Mireu Stadium	Yongin	Final round	6–1	2	0

=== Other matches ===
Date	Match	Venue	Location	Round	Result	Yellow cards	Red cards
27 April 2014	Philippines – Malaysia	Cebu City Sports Center	Cebu City	Friendlies	0–0	3	0
6 September 2014	Palestine – Chinese Taipei	Rizal Memorial Stadium	Manila	Friendlies	7–3	0	0
6 September 2016	Kyrgyzstan – Philippines	Dolen Omurzakov Stadium	Bishkek	Friendlies	1–2	4	0
23 June 2018	Indonesia – South Korea	Pakansari Stadium	Cibinong	Friendlies	1–2	2	0
24 September 2022	Laos – Maldives	Hassanal Bolkiah National Stadium	Bandar Seri Begawan	Friendlies	1–3	2	0
18 February 2023	Indonesia – Fiji	Gelora Bung Karno Stadium	Jakarta	PSSI U-20 Mini Tournament	4–0	0	2
22 February 2023	Indonesia – Guatemala	Gelora Bung Karno Stadium	Jakarta	PSSI U-20 Mini Tournament	0–1	3	1
8 September 2023	Singapore – Tajikistan	Bishan Stadium	Bishan	Friendlies	0–2	3	1
30 January 2024	Indonesia – Uzbekistan	Madya Stadium	Jakarta	Friendlies	2–3	6	0
25 March 2024	China – Indonesia	Madya Stadium	Jakarta	Friendlies	1–1	4	0
