= Hugo Samir =

Indonesian footballer (born 2005)

Personal information
- Full name: Hugo Samir
- Date of birth: 25 January 2005 (age 21)
- Place of birth: Surabaya, Indonesia
- Height: 1.77 m (5 ft 10 in)
- Positions: Winger; forward

Team information
- Current team: Borneo Samarinda
- Number: 18

Youth career
- 2017–2018: Persebaya Surabaya
- 2018–2019: ASIOP
- 2019–2020: Barito Putera
- 2020–2021: Bhayangkara
- 2021–2022: Persis Solo

Senior career*
Years	Team	Apps	(Gls)
2023–2024	Persis Solo	0	(0)
2023–2024	→ Borneo Samarinda (loan)	0	(0)
2024–2026	Persik Kediri	21	(0)
2026	→ Persiku Kudus (loan)	9	(0)
2026–	Borneo Samarinda	2	(1)

International career^{‡}
2023	Indonesia U20	6	(0)
2023–	Indonesia U23	4	(1)
- * Club domestic league appearances and goals as of 27 October 2026 ‡ National team caps and goals as of 28 September 2023

Hugo Samir (born 25 January 2005) is an Indonesian professional footballer who plays as a winger or a forward for Super League club Borneo FC Samarinda.

== Club career ==
=== Youth ===
As a youth player, he played for Persebaya U13, ASIOP Academy, Barito Putera U16, Bhayangkara U18, and Persis Solo U20.

=== Persis Solo ===
On 1 November 2021, Samir joined the team coached by his father, Persis Solo on a free transfer and played at their several junior level team. He didn't make an appearance for the senior team.

==== Loan to Borneo Samarinda ====
On 27 June 2023, Samir signed for Borneo FC Samarinda on loan for the 2023–2024 season.

== International career ==
In January 2023, Hugo was called up to the Indonesia U20 for the training centre in preparation for 2023 AFC U-20 Asian Cup. He is eligible to represent Brazil through his father.

In September 2023, Hugo was called up by Indra Sjafri to the Indonesia U-23 team for the 2022 Asian Games tournament. On 19 September 2023, he made his debut for the under-23 team and also scored a goal against Kyrgyzstan in a 2–0 win.

== Career statistics ==
As of 27 October 2026

Appearances and goals by club, season and competition
Club	Season	League			Cup		Continental		Other		Total	
Club	Season	Division	Apps	Goals	Apps	Goals	Apps	Goals	Apps	Goals	Apps	Goals
Persis Solo	2022–23	Liga 1	0	0	0	0	—		0	0	0	0
Borneo Samarinda (loan)	2023–24	Liga 1	0	0	0	0	—		0	0	0	0
Persik Kediri	2024–25	Liga 1	20	0	0	0	—		0	0	20	0
Persik Kediri	2025–26	Super League	1	0	0	0	—		0	0	1	0
Persiku Kudus (loan)	2025–26	Championship	9	0	0	0	—		0	0	9	0
Borneo Samarinda	2026–27	Super League	2	1	0	0	2	0	1	0	5	1
Career total			32	1	0	0	2	0	1	0	35	1

=== International goals ===
International under-23 goals

Goal	Date	Venue	Opponent	Score	Result	Competition
1.	19 September 2023	Zhejiang Normal University East Stadium, Jinhua, China	Kyrgyzstan	2–0	2–0	2022 Asian Games GS

== Personal life ==
Born in Surabaya, Indonesia, Samir is the son of Jacksen F. Tiago, a Brazilian football manager and also former footballer. His mother is Indonesian of Arab descent.

Samir is practicing Muslim. He is also a Hafiz of the Quran and has won third place in the Adhan competition.

=== 2021 sanctions ===
In November 2021, PSSI stated that Samir and several other people were fined and sanctioned in relation to the Bhayangkara FC U-18 vs Persebaya U-18 match in the Elite Pro Academy Liga 1 U18 event on 28 October 2021. Samir was banned from playing and entering the field for 12 months and fined Rp 5,000,000 for kicking an official staff during the match.
