= Nazmi Nasaruddin =

Malaysian football referee

- Full name: Muhammad Nazmi Bin Nasaruddin
- Born: 26 February 1990 (age 36); Penang, Malaysia

Domestic
Years	League	Role
2016–	Malaysia Premier League	Referee
2018–	Malaysia Super League	Referee
2023–	V.League 1	Referee
2024–	Super League	Referee

International
Years	League	Role
2016–	FIFA listed	Referee

Muhammad Nazmi Bin Nasaruddin (born 26 February 1990) also known as Nazmi Nasaruddin, is a Malaysian professional football referee FIFA since 2016 and has also refereed a number of AFC Champions League matches. Nazmi was selected to be referee of the Final of the 2023 AFC U-20 Asian Cup held in Uzbekistan.

Nazmi refereed the matches in the 2016 AFC Solidarity Cup, 2018 AFC U-16 Championship, 2022 Asian Games, 2023 AFC U-20 Asian Cup, 2023 AFC Asian Cup and the 2022 EAFF E-1 Football Championship. He has also officiated in the V. League 1 and Super League.

== Refereeing career ==
Nazmi has refereed in the Malaysia Premier League and Malaysia Super League since 2011, being promoted to the FIFA international referee list in 2016. He officiated numerous matches in the AFC Champions League and the AFC Cup, as a fourth official before becoming the main referee in the 2020 AFC Champions League group stage fixture between Al Shorta and Al Wehda.

In February 2017, he officiated a 2017 AFC Cup match, the group stage tie between Yadanarbon and Home United.

In 2019, Nazmi also officiated in a number of international friendlies match between in the Oceania continent.

In 2023, Nazmi was also selected to officiate a match in the 2023 V.League 1 season and the 2022 Asian Games. On 14 September 2023, the AFC announced that he and 32 more other referees to the be the main referee in the 2023 AFC Asian Cup in Qatar. On 24 January 2024, he was selected to officiate a match between Iraq and Vietnam. Nazmi got another opportunity in the Round of 16 ties between Uzbekistan and Thailand.

== Notable matches ==
=== AFC tournament ===
2016 AFC Solidarity Cup – Malaysia
Date	Match	Location	Venue	Round
6 November 2016	Mongolia – Sri Lanka	Kuching	Sarawak State Stadium	Group stage
14 November 2016	Laos – Brunei	Kuching	Sarawak Stadium	Third place

2018 AFC U-16 Championship – Malaysia
Date	Match	Location	Venue	Round
21 September 2018	Oman – Yemen	Petaling Jaya	Petaling Jaya Stadium	Group stage
24 September 2018	India – Iran	Kuala Lumpur	Bukit Jalil National Stadium	Group stage
27 September 2018	North Korea – Oman	Petaling Jaya	Petaling Jaya Stadium	Group stage
4 October 2018	Tajikistan – South Korea	Petaling Jaya	Petaling Jaya Stadium	Semi-finals

2023 AFC U-20 Asian Cup – Uzbekistan
Date	Match	Location	Venue	Round
1 March 2023	Uzbekistan – Syria	Tashkent	Milliy Stadium	Group stage
4 March 2023	Iran – Australia	Fergana	Istiqlol Stadium	Group stage
7 March 2023	Qatar – Australia	Tashkent	JAR Stadium	Group stage
9 March 2023	Saudi Arabia – Japan	Tashkent	Lokomotiv Stadium	Group stage
11 March 2023	Iran – Iraq	Tashkent	JAR Stadium	Quarter-finals
18 March 2023	Uzbekistan – Iraq	Tashkent	Milliy Stadium	Final

2023 AFC Asian Cup – Qatar
Date	Match	Location	Venue	Round
24 January 2024	Iraq – Vietnam	Al Rayyan	Jassim bin Hamad Stadium	Group stage
30 January 2024	Uzbekistan – Thailand	Al Wakrah	Al Janoub Stadium	Round of 16

=== Others notable matches ===
Date	Match	Location		Tournament
24 July 2022	South Korea – Hong Kong	Toyota, Japan	Toyota Stadium	2022 EAFF E-1 Football Championship
26 February 2022	Johor Darul Ta'zim – Kuala Lumpur City	Johor, Malaysia	Sultan Ibrahim Stadium	2022 Piala Sumbangsih
10 September 2022	Johor Darul Ta'zim – Terengganu	Kuala Lumpur, Malaysia	Bukit Jalil National Stadium	2022 Malaysia FA Cup Final
26 November 2022	Johor Darul Ta'zim – Selangor	Kuala Lumpur, Malaysia	Bukit Jalil National Stadium	2022 Malaysia Cup Final
22 July 2023	Johor Darul Ta'zim – Kuala Lumpur City	Kuala Lumpur, Malaysia	Bukit Jalil National Stadium	2023 Malaysia FA Cup Final
25 September 2023	Palestine – Japan	Hangzhou, China	Xiaoshan Sports Centre Stadium	2022 Asian Games Group stage
27 September 2023	Iran – Thailand	Hangzhou, China	Shangcheng Sports Centre Stadium	2022 Asian Games Round of 16
31 August 2024	Thep Xanh Nam Dinh – Dong A Thanh Hoa	Nam Định, Vietnam	Thiên Trường Stadium	2024 Vietnamese Super Cup
23 September 2024	Persib Bandung – Persija Jakarta	Bandung, Indonesia	Si Jalak Harupat Stadium	2024-25 BRI Liga 1
10 October 2024	Australia – China	Adelaide, Australia	Adelaide Oval	2026 FIFA World Cup qualification R3
