= Dastanbek Toktosunov =

Kyrgyzstani footballer

Personal information
- Full name: Dastanbek Abdylbekovich Toktosunov
- Date of birth: 2 September 2002 (age 24)
- Place of birth: Kochkor-Ata, Kyrgyzstan
- Height: 1.84 m (6 ft 0 in)
- Position: Centre-forward

Team information
- Current team: Neftchi Kochkor-Ata
- Number: 99

Youth career
- Kaganat

Senior career*
Years	Team	Apps	(Gls)
2020–2022	Kaganat	52	(5)
2023–	Neftchi Kochkor-Ata	23	(7)

International career^{‡}
2023–	Kyrgyzstan U23	9	(1)
2023–	Kyrgyzstan	3	(0)
- * Club domestic league appearances and goals as of 5 November 2023 ‡ National team caps and goals as of 30 December 2023

Dastanbek Abdylbekovich Toktosunov (Kyrgyz: Дастанбек Токтосунов; Russian: Дастанбек Абдылбекович Токтосунов; born 2 September 2002) is a Kyrgyzstani football player who plays as a centre-forward for Neftchi Kochkor-Ata and the Kyrgyzstan national team.

== International career ==
In 2023, Toktosunov represented Kyrgyzstan at the Asian Games.

Toktosunov made his debut for the senior Kyrgyzstan national team on 12 October 2023 in a friendly against Bahrain.

He was included in Kyrgyzstan's squad for the 2023 AFC Asian Cup.
