= Yōta Komi =

Japanese association football player

Yōta Komi 小見 洋太
Personal information
- Full name: Yōta Komi
- Date of birth: 11 August 2002 (age 24)
- Place of birth: Saitama, Japan
- Height: 1.69 m (5 ft 7 in)
- Position: Forward

Team information
- Current team: Cerezo Osaka
- Number: 41

Youth career
- FC Lien
- 2015–2017: FC Lavida
- 2018–2020: Shohei High School

Senior career*
| Years | Team | Apps | (Gls) |
| 2021–2025 | Albirex Niigata | 101 | (9) |
| 2025–2026 | Kashiwa Reysol | 21 | (3) |
| 2026– | Cerezo Osaka | 0 | (0) |

International career
| 2020 | Japan U18 | | |
Medal record
Men's football
Representing Japan
Asian Games
| Silver medal – second place | 2022 Hangzhou | Team |
- * Club domestic league appearances and goals as of 10 August 2026

Yōta Komi (小見 洋太, Komi Yōta; born 11 August 2002) is a Japanese footballer who plays as a forward for Cerezo Osaka.

== Club career ==
On 28 September 2020, it was announced that Komi would be joining Albirex from the 2021 season.

Komi made his professional debut in a 4–1 Emperor's Cup match against Zweigen Kanazawa on 9 June 2021. On 27 December 2021, he extended his contract with the club for the 2022 season. He scored his first goals for the club against Yokohama FC on 21 May 2022, scoring a brace. On 29 September 2022, Komi's total playing time exceeded the 900 minutes required to sign a Pro A contract, so he signed a Pro A contract with the club. On 5 December 2022, he extended his contract with the club for the 2023 season. On 12 December 2023, Komi's contract with the club was extended for the 2024 season. On 29 August 2024, he was injured during training and would be out for three weeks.

== International career ==
On 1 September 2023, Komi was selected as part of the Japan U22 squad for the 2022 Asian Games.

On 15 March 2024, Komi was called up to the Japan U23 squad for friendly matches.

== Career statistics ==
=== Club ===
As of 6 November 2021

| Club | Season | League | | | National Cup | | League Cup | | Other | | Total | |
| Club | Season | Division | Apps | Goals | Apps | Goals | Apps | Goals | Apps | Goals | Apps | Goals |
|---|---|---|---|---|---|---|---|---|---|---|---|---|
| Albirex Niigata | 2021 | J2 League | 2 | 0 | 1 (Note: Appearances in the Emperor's Cup) | 0 | 0 | 0 | 0 | 0 | 3 | 0 |
| Career total | | | 2 | 0 | 1 | 0 | 0 | 0 | 0 | 0 | 3 | 0 |
