= Park Jae-yong (footballer, born 2000) =

South Korean footballer (born 2000)

Personal information
- Full name: Park Jae-yong
- Date of birth: 13 March 2000 (age 26)
- Place of birth: Gwangmyeong, Gyeonggi-do, South Korea
- Height: 1.93 m (6 ft 4 in)
- Position: Striker

Team information
- Current team: Seoul E-Land
- Number: 16

Youth career
- 2016–2018: Anyang
- 2017–2019: Incheon University

Senior career*
Years	Team	Apps	(Gls)
2022–2023	Anyang	37	(8)
2023–2025	Jeonbuk Hyundai Motors	36	(4)
2023–	Seoul E-Land	18	(8)

International career^{‡}
2023	South Korea U23	7	(1)
Medal record
Men's football
Representing South Korea
Asian Games
Gold medal – first place	2022 Hangzhou	Team
- * Club domestic league appearances and goals as of 5 August 2026 ‡ National team caps and goals as of 4 October 2023

- Park Jae-yong
- Hangul: 박재용
- RR: Bak Jaeyong
- MR: Pak Chaeyong

Park Jae-yong (Korean: 박재용; born 13 March 2000) is a South Korean professional footballer who plays as a striker for Seoul E-Land in the K League 2.

== Early life ==
Park was born in South Korea. He played for Anyang for a bit before studying at Incheon University.

== Club career ==
=== Anyang ===
In 2022, Park signed for K League 2 side FC Anyang after finishing his third year in the Incheon University. He scored two goals in his first season in the professional level, with most of his appearances were as a substitute. In his second season, Park became a regular starter for his team and scored 6 goals in 18 league appearances.

=== Jeonbuk Hyundai Motors ===
On 20 July 2023, Park joined Jeonbuk Hyundai Motors and was given the number 10 shirt. He scored his first goal in his K League 1 debut against Incheon United in a 2–0 win.

== International career ==
In 2023, Park was selected to play for the South Korea national Olympic team in the 2022 Asian Games. He scored a goal in South Korea's 9–0 victory against Kuwait Olympic.

== Honours ==
South Korea U23

- Asian Games: 2022
