= Um Won-sang =

South Korean footballer (born 1999)

- Um in 2026

Personal information
- Full name: Um Won-sang
- Date of birth: 6 January 1999 (age 27)
- Place of birth: Gwangju, South Korea
- Height: 1.73 m (5 ft 8 in)
- Positions: Winger; forward

Team information
- Current team: Daejeon Hana Citizen
- Number: 11

Youth career
- 2014–2016: Kumho High School (Youth)

College career
Years	Team	Apps	(Gls)
2017–2019	Ajou University		

Senior career*
Years	Team	Apps	(Gls)
2019–2021	Gwangju FC	65	(15)
2022–2025	Ulsan HD	117	(21)
2026–	Daejeon Hana Citizen	10	(2)

International career^{‡}
2016	South Korea U17	2	(0)
2016–2019	South Korea U20	31	(9)
2019–2023	South Korea U23	27 (Note: Includes two appearances against another KFA team.)	(6)
2020–	South Korea	8	(0)
Medal record
Men's football
Representing South Korea
Asian Games
Gold medal – first place	2022 Hangzhou	Team
EAFF Championship
Runner-up	2022 Japan	Team
AFC U-19 Championship
Runner-up	2018 Indonesia
FIFA U-20 World Cup
Runner-up	2019 Poland
AFC U-23 Championship
Gold medal – first place	2020 Thailand
- * Club domestic league appearances and goals as of 3 August 2026 ‡ National team caps and goals as of 6 June 2024

Um Won-sang (Korean: 엄원상; born 6 January 1999) is a South Korean footballer who plays as a winger or a forward for Daejeon Hana Citizen and the South Korea national team. He mainly plays as a right winger.

== Club career ==
A graduate of Ajou University, in 2019 he signed his first professional contract with Gwangju FC, hailing from his hometown, and was given the number 17 shirt. On March 3, 2019, in the first game of the season against Seoul E-Land, Um made his professional debut, coming in for the injured Kim Jeong-hwan at the 39th minute and being involved in a 2–0 win for his side. He also debuted in the national FA Cup, scoring a goal in the "Griffins"' win against the representatives of the Andong College after a penalty shoot-out: he didn't take part in Gwangju's following game (a 3–0 loss against Suwon Samsung Bluewings) and several K League 2 matches, as he was involved in the FIFA U-20 World Cup.

Mainly used as a substitute throughout the first half of the season, he featured more frequently in the starting XI during the second half, and scored his first goal on September 1, when he netted the opener against Ansan Greeners, but couldn't avoid Gwangju's 2–1 final defeat. He added another one on October 27, taking part in his team's 3-0 win against Suwon FC. Um concluded his debut professional season with 16 total appearances and two goals, contributing to the "Griffins"' victory of the league title and consequent promotion to the K League 1.

In 2020, Um missed Gwangju's first three games of the season: however, he scored on his debut in the top-tier league, as his team drew 1–1 with Ulsan Hyundai. Manager Park Jin-sub soon established him as a frequent starter of his side, as Um usually formed an attacking partnership with left winger Willyan and center-forward Felipe Silva. On July 5, 2020, he served his first assist to Felipe in a 2–4 loss against Daegu FC. On August 1, he scored his first brace in a 3–1 away win against Incheon United, and another one came on September 12, in a 3–3 draw against Jeonbuk Hyundai Motors: in this last occasion, his former goal was a volley lob over the head of goalkeeper Song Bum-keun, while the latter one was a shot in the bottom corner of the net after an assist by Lim Min-hyeok.

Despite being only in the second year of his senior career, in 2020 Um registered 23 appearances, seven goals and two assists, taking part in the "Griffins"' surprising sixth placement at the end of the season.

== International career ==
He represented South Korea at several youth levels.

In 2018, he took part both in the Toulon Tournament, where the South Korean selection was eliminated in the group stage, and the AFC Under-19 Championship, where he helped his side reach the final by scoring a goal against Qatar in the semi-final. However, South Korea eventually lost 1–2 to Saudi Arabia.

In 2019, he was selected by head coach Chung Jung-yong to take part in the FIFA U-20 World Cup in Poland. He usually came off the bench (except for the group stage game against South Africa, where he was a starter), but still contributed in the Taeguk Warriors' road to the tournament's final, then lost to Ukraine with the score of 3–1.

In 2020, he was selected by head coach Kim Hak-bum to be part of the squad that would participate to the AFC U-23 Championship in Thailand. Featured as a starter against China, Uzbekistan (in the group stage) and Australia (in the semi-final), he often found himself alternating with Lee Dong-jun on the right wing and eventually contributed to the Taegeuk Warriors' first victory of the competition, as they beat Saudi Arabia after the extra-time in the final and qualified for the Olympics.

He got his first senior international call-up from head coach Paulo Bento for the international friendlies against Mexico and Qatar on November 14 and 17, 2020. He subsequently made his full international debut in the latter match, coming in for Hwang Hee-chan at the 76th minute.

== Career statistics ==
As of 9 December 2025

Club performance			League		Cup		Continental		Other		Total	
Club	Season	League	Apps	Goals	Apps	Goals	Apps	Goals	Apps	Goals	Apps	Goals
Gwangju FC	2019	K League 2	16	2	1	1	—		—		17	3
Gwangju FC	2020	K League 1	23	7	0	0	—		—		23	7
Gwangju FC	2021	K League 1	26	6	0	0	—		—		26	6
Gwangju FC	Total		65	15	1	1	—		—		66	16
Ulsan HD	2022	K League 1	33	12	1	0	7 (Note: Appearances in AFC Champions League (Elite))	3	—		41	15
Ulsan HD	2023	K League 1	28	4	0	0	4	0	—		32	4
Ulsan HD	2024	K League 1	26	4	3	1	6	0	—		35	5
Ulsan HD	2025	K League 1	30	1	1	0	5	2	2 (Note: Appearances in FIFA Club World Cup)	1	38	4
Ulsan HD	Total		117	21	5	1	22	5	2	1	146	28
Career total			182	36	6	2	22	5	2	1	212	44

== Honours ==
Gwangju

- K League 2: 2019

Ulsan HD

- K League 1: 2022, 2023, 2024

Individual

- K League 1 Best XI: 2023

South Korea U19

- AFC U-19 Championship runner-up: 2018

South Korea U20

- FIFA U-20 World Cup runner-up: 2019

South Korea U23

- AFC U-23 Championship: 2020
- Asian Games: 2022
