= Hangzhou Xiaoshan Sports Centre =

Football stadium in Hangzhou, China

Coordinates: 30°09′21″N 120°15′44″E

Hangzhou Xiaoshan Sports Centre Stadium
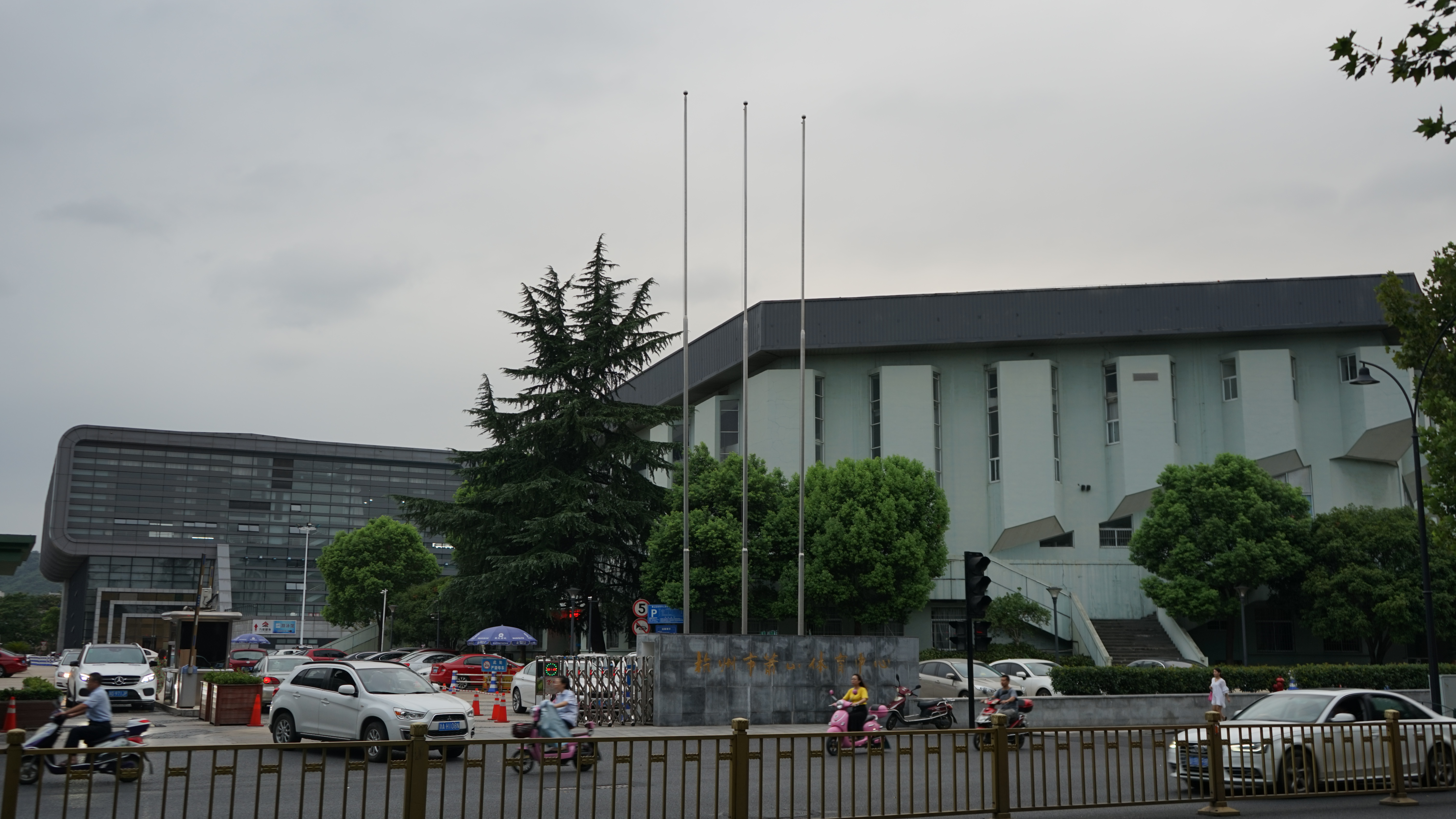
- Interactive map of Hangzhou Xiaoshan Sports Centre Stadium
- Full name: Hangzhou Xiaoshan Sports Centre Stadium
- Location: Xiaoshan, Hangzhou, China
- Capacity: 10,118
- Surface: Grass

Construction
- Opened: 1998
- Reopened: 2022

The Hangzhou Xiaoshan Sports Centre Stadium (Simplified Chinese: 杭州萧山体育中心) is a football stadium in Xiaoshan, Hangzhou, China. The original stadium completed on October 11, 1998 and had a capacity of 15,000 until it was demolished in 2019. The new stadium was started rebuilt and it was reopened on 22 July 2022. It holds 10,118 people currently. The stadium is the home of Hangzhou Sanchao.
