= Kyrgyzstan national under-23 football team =

Kyrgyzstan Under-23
- Association: Football Federation of the Kyrgyz Republic
- Confederation: AFC
- Head coach: Edmar
- Home stadium: Spartak Stadium
First colours	Second colours

AFC U-23 Asian Cup
- Appearances: 1 (first in 2026)
- Best result: Group stage

The Kyrgyzstan U-23 national football team is a youth football team operated under the Football Federation of the Kyrgyz Republic. The team would represent Kyrgyzstan in the Summer Olympics, AFC U-22 Asian Cup, and the Asian Games.

== Competition history ==
=== Olympic record ===
Summer Olympic Games Record
Year	Result	Position	Pld	W	D	L	GF	GA
(Spain) 1992	Did not qualify							
(United States) 1996	Did not qualify							
(Australia) 2000	Did not enter							
(Greece) 2004	Did not qualify							
(China) 2008	Did not qualify							
(United Kingdom) 2012	Did not qualify							
(Brazil) 2016	Did not qualify							
(Japan) 2020	Did not qualify							
(France) 2024	Did not qualify							
(United States) 2028	To be determined							
Total		0 / 7						

=== AFC U-23 Asian Cup ===
AFC U-23 Asian Cup
Year	Round	Position	GP	W	D	L	GF	GA
(Oman) 2013	did not qualify							
(Qatar) 2016	did not qualify							
(China) 2018	did not qualify							
(Thailand) 2020	did not qualify							
(Uzbekistan) 2022	did not qualify							
(Qatar) 2024	did not qualify							
(Saudi Arabia) 2026	Group stage	15th	3	0	0	3	1	4
(Japan) 2028	To be determined							
Total	1/8		3	0	0	3	1	4

=== Asian Games ===
Asian Games record
Year	Result	Position	Pld	W	T	L	GF	GA
Senior National Team
1951 – 1998	See Kyrgyzstan national football team							
Under-23 National Team
(South Korea) 2002	Withdrew							
(Qatar) 2006	Withdrew							
(China) 2010	Round 1	23	3	0	0	3	2	7
(South Korea) 2014	Round 1	16	3	0	1	2	1	4
(Indonesia) 2018	Round 1	20	3	0	1	2	3	6
(China) 2022	Round of 16	12	4	1	0	3	5	9
(Japan) 2026	Group stage	10	3	1	0	2	6	10
Total	1/8		16	2	2	12	17	36

== Recent results and fixtures ==
Win Draw Lose

== Players ==
=== Current squad ===
The following 20 players were called up for the 2022 Asian Games.

No.	Pos.	Player	Date of birth (age)	Club
1	GK	Nursultan Nusupov	22 July 2004 (age 22)	(Kyrgyz Football Union) Talant
13	GK	Artem Pryadkin	18 September 2001 (age 25)	(Kyrgyz Football Union) Dordoi Bishkek
16	GK	Kurmanbek Nurlanbekov	1 April 2004 (age 22)	(Kyrgyz Football Union) Dordoi Bishkek
2	DF	Adilet Nurlan Uulu	30 March 2002 (age 24)	(Kyrgyz Football Union) Dordoi Bishkek
3	DF	Elaman Akylbekov	11 August 2003 (age 23)	(Kyrgyz Football Union) Alay
4	DF	Bayaman Kumarbay Uulu	6 February 2001 (age 25)	(Kyrgyz Football Union) Alga Bishkek
5	DF	Bekzatbek Nasirov	5 February 2002 (age 24)	(Kyrgyz Football Union) Neftchi Kochkorata
17	DF	Arslan Bekberdinov	14 August 2003 (age 23)	(Kyrgyz Football Union) Abdysh-Ata Kant
6	MF	Adilet Kanybekov	25 November 2002 (age 23)	(Football Association of Malaysia) Perak F.C.
8	MF	Islam Mezhitov	4 January 2000 (age 26)	(Kyrgyz Football Union) Abdysh-Ata Kant
14	MF	Irrakhimbek Nurmat Uulu	27 January 2003 (age 23)	(Kyrgyz Football Union) Neftchi Kochkor-Ata
18	MF	Mirlan Bekberdinov	14 August 2003 (age 23)	(Kyrgyz Football Union) Ilbirs Bishkek
20	MF	Midin Kerezbekov	13 January 2001 (age 25)	(Kyrgyz Football Union) Talant
23	MF	Arsen Sharshenbekov	16 March 2004 (age 22)	(Russian Football Union) Alania Vladikavkaz
7	FW	Atai Ilichbek Uulu	18 March 2004 (age 22)	(Kyrgyz Football Union) Ilbirs Bishkek
9	FW	Nurbol Baktybekov	23 February 2004 (age 22)	(Kyrgyz Football Union) Ilbirs Bishkek
10	FW	Bektur Abdyvaliev	29 April 2003 (age 23)	(Kyrgyz Football Union) Dordoi Bishkek
11	FW	Maksat Alygulov	21 December 2000 (age 25)	(Kyrgyz Football Union) Alga Bishkek
19	FW	Dastanbek Toktosunov	2 September 2002 (age 24)	(Kyrgyz Football Union) Neftchi Kochkor-Ata
21	FW	Ernaz Abilov	30 March 2001 (age 25)	(Kyrgyz Football Union) Alga Bishkek

=== Recent call-ups ===
The following players have also been called up within the last twelve months, and remain eligible for selection.

Pos.	Player	Date of birth (age)	Caps	Goals	Club	Latest call-up

== Coaching staffs ==
Position	Name
Head coach	(Russia) Maksim Lisitsyn

== See also ==
- Football Federation of the Kyrgyz Republic
- Kyrgyzstan national football team
- Kyrgyzstan women's national football team
