= Jinhua Stadium =

Sports venue in Zhejiang, China

Coordinates: 29°05′39″N 119°38′58″E

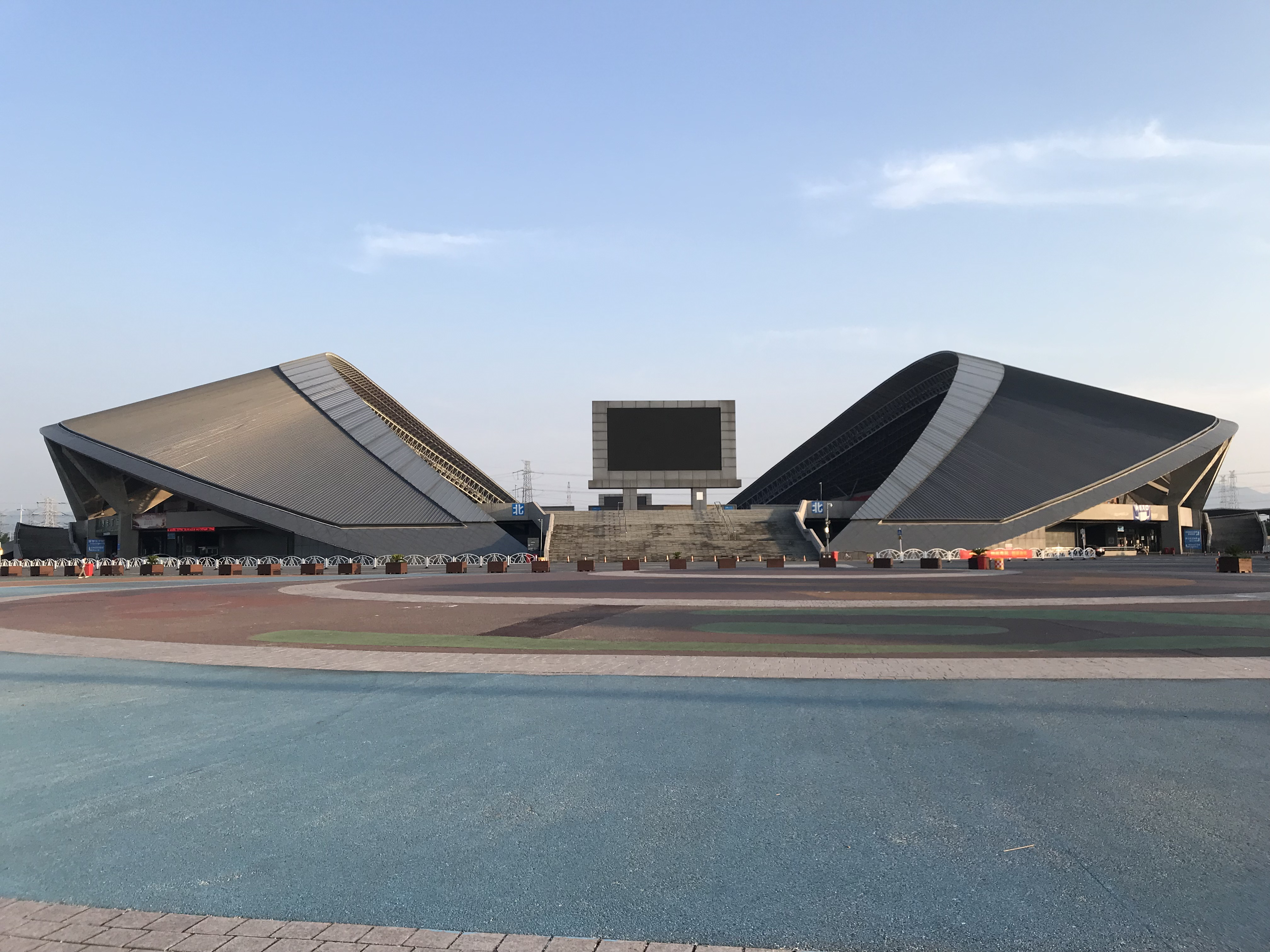
- Interactive map of Jinhua Stadium
- Location: Jinhua, China
- Capacity: 29,800

Construction
- Opened: 2013
- Renovated: 2020

The Jinhua Stadium (金华体育中心) is a sports venue in Zhejiang, China. It has a capacity of 29,800 and it is used mostly for football matches. It is also used for athletics.
