= Zhejiang Normal University East Stadium =

Sports venue in Jinhua, China

- Full name: Zhejiang Normal University East Stadium
- Location: Jinhua, China
- Capacity: 11,349
- Surface: Grass

Construction
- Opened: 2007
- Renovated: 2019

Zhejiang Normal University East Stadium is a stadium in Jinhua, China. It was a venue for the 19th Asian Games and has hosted some international football matches. It was opened in 2007 and was renovated from 2019 to 2022 for the 19th Asian Games.
