= Shangcheng Sports Centre Stadium =

Sports venue in Hangzhou, China

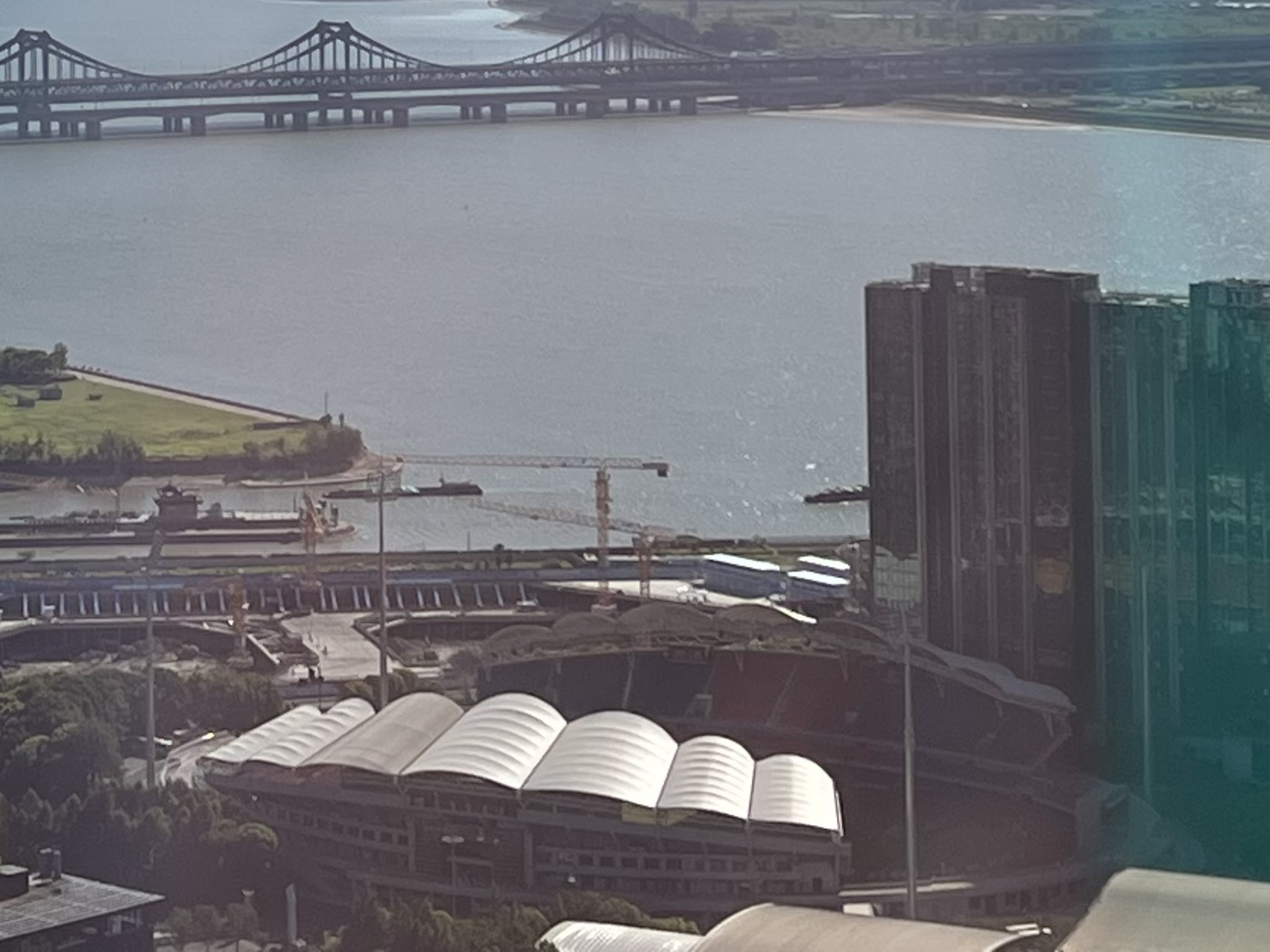
- Full name: Shangcheng Sports Centre Stadium
- Location: Hangzhou, China
- Capacity: 13,544
- Surface: Grass

Construction
- Opened: 2009
- Renovated: 2019

Shangcheng Sports Centre Stadium is a stadium in Hangzhou, China. It was a venue for the 19th Asian Games and has hosted some international football matches and have a capacity of 13,544. It was opened in September 2009 and was renovated in April 2019 for the 19th Asian Games.

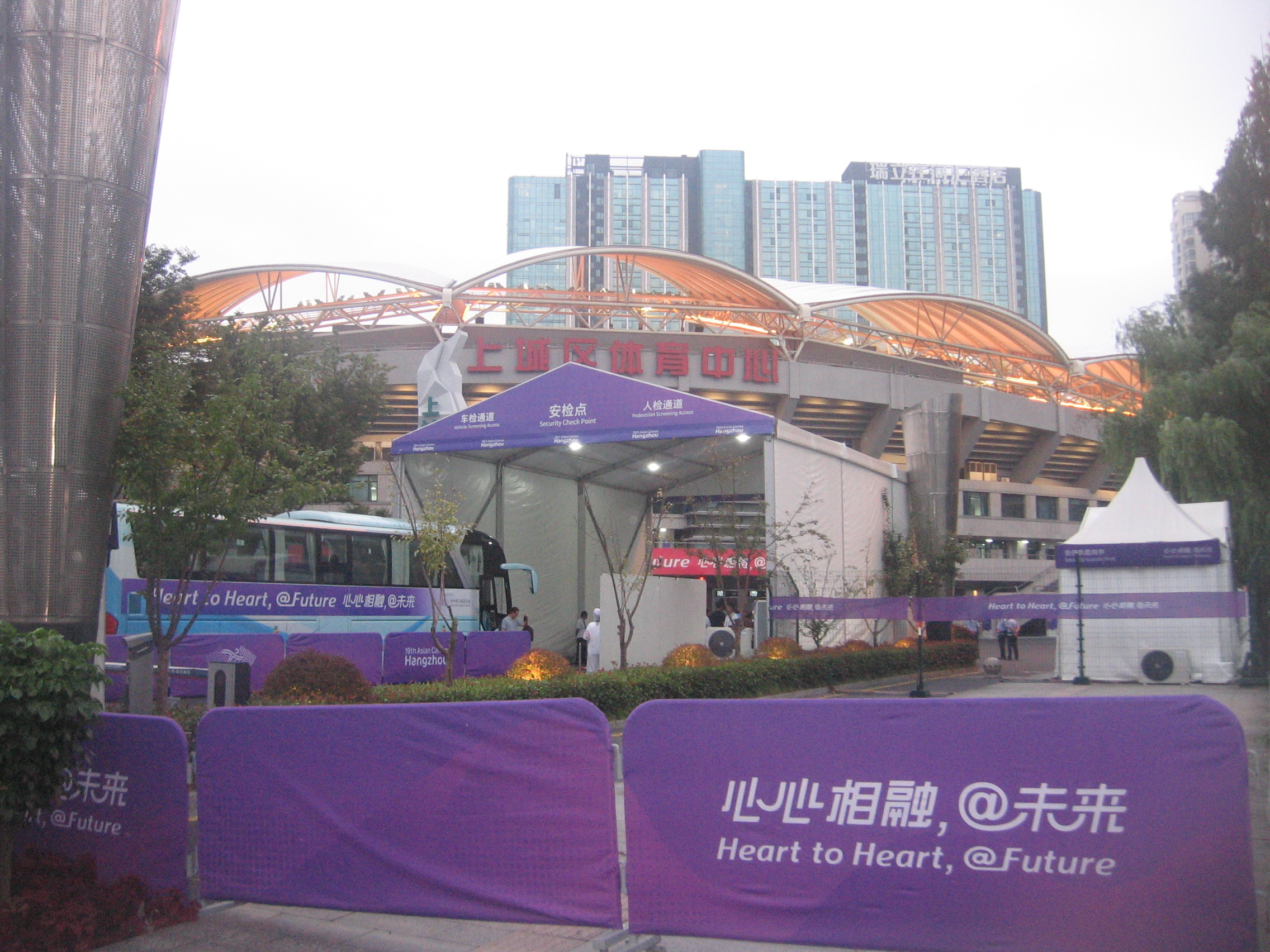
Shangcheng Sports Center Stadium during the 2022 Asian Games.
