= Sailing at the 2022 Asian Games =

- Venue: Xiangshan Sailing Centre
- Dates: 21–27 September 2023
- Competitors: 129 from 17 nations

Sailing at the 2022 Asian Games was held at Xiangshan Sailing Centre, Ningbo, China from 21 to 27 September 2023. Even though no medal races were completed on 27 September as the wind conditions in the course area did not meet the requirement of racing.

== Schedule ==
●	Round	●	Last round	M	Medal round

Event↓/Date →	21st Thu	22nd Fri	23rd Sat	24th Sun	25th Mon	26th Tue	27th Wed
Men's Formula Kite	●●●●	●●●●	●●●●	●●	●●		M
Men's iQFoil	●●●●	●●●●	●●●●	●●		●●●●	M
Men's RS:X	●●●	●●●	●●	●●	●●	●●	
Boys' ILCA 4	●●	●●	●●	●●	●●	●	
Men's ILCA 7	●●	●●	●●●		●●	●●	M
Men's 49er	●●●	●●●	●●	●●	●●	●●	
Women's Formula Kite	●●●●	●●●●	●●●●	●●	●●		M
Women's iQFoil	●●●●	●●●●	●●●●	●●		●●●●	M
Women's RS:X	●●●	●●●	●●	●●	●●	●●	
Girls' ILCA 4	●●	●●	●●	●●	●●	●	
Women's ILCA 6	●●	●●	●●●		●●	●●	M
Women's 49erFX	●●●	●●●	●●	●●	●●	●●	
Mixed 470	●●	●●	●●	●●	●●	●●	
Mixed Nacra 17	●●●	●●●	●●	●●	●●	●●	

== Medalists ==
=== Men ===
Event	Gold	Silver	Bronze
Formula Kite	Max Maeder; Singapore	Zhang Haoran; China	Joseph Weston; Thailand
iQFoil	Bi Kun; China	Lee Tae-hoon; South Korea	Cheng Ching Yin; Hong Kong
RS:X	Cho Won-woo; South Korea	Natthaphong Phonoppharat; Thailand	Eabad Ali; India
ILCA 4	Weka Bhanubandh; Thailand	Isaac Goh; Singapore	Asnawi Iqbal Adam; Malaysia
ILCA 7	Ryan Lo; Singapore	Ha Jee-min; South Korea	Vishnu Saravanan; India
49er	China; Wen Zaiding; Liu Tian	Oman; Musab Al-Hadi; Waleed Al-Kendi	Hong Kong; Akira Sakai; Russell Aylsworth

=== Women ===
Event	Gold	Silver	Bronze
Formula Kite	Chen Jingyue; China	Benyapa Jantawan; Thailand	Lee Young-eun; South Korea
iQFoil	Huang Xianting; China	Ma Kwan Ching; Hong Kong	Aticha Homraruen; Thailand
RS:X	Siripon Kaewduang-ngam; Thailand	Ngai Wai Yan; Hong Kong	Tengku Nuraini; Malaysia
ILCA 4	Noppasorn Khunboonjan; Thailand	Neha Thakur; India	Keira Carlyle; Singapore
ILCA 6	Nur Shazrin Mohd Latif; Malaysia	Stephanie Norton; Hong Kong	Victoria Chan; Singapore
49erFX	China; Hu Xiaoyu; Shan Mengyuan	Japan; Misaki Tanaka; Sera Nagamatsu	Singapore; Kimberly Lim; Cecilia Low

=== Mixed ===
Event	Gold	Silver	Bronze
470	Japan; Keiju Okada; Miho Yoshioka	China; Dong Wenju; Wang Jingsa	South Korea; Kim Ji-a; Cho Sung-min
Nacra 17	China; Zhao Huancheng; Wang Saibo	Singapore; Justin Liu; Denise Lim	Japan; Shibuki Iitsuka; Oura Nishida Capiglia

== Medal table ==
Rank	Nation	Gold	Silver	Bronze	Total
1	China (CHN)	6	2	0	8
2	Thailand (THA)	3	2	2	7
3	Singapore (SGP)	2	2	3	7
4	South Korea (KOR)	1	2	2	5
5	Japan (JPN)	1	1	1	3
6	Malaysia (MAS)	1	0	2	3
7	Hong Kong (HKG)	0	3	2	5
8	India (IND)	0	1	2	3
9	Oman (OMA)	0	1	0	1
Totals (9 entries)		14	14	14	42

== Participating nations ==
A total of 129 athletes from 17 nations competed in sailing at the 2022 Asian Games:

- Bahrain (2)
- Cambodia (3)
- China (14)
- Chinese Taipei (1)
- Hong Kong (13)
- India (16)
- Japan (12)
- Malaysia (7)
- Oman (4)
- Pakistan (5)
- Philippines (1)
- Qatar (2)
- Singapore (13)
- South Korea (12)
- Sri Lanka (2)
- Thailand (18)
- United Arab Emirates (4)
