= 2026 ISSF World Shooting Championships – Men's 10 metre air rifle team =

Men's 10 metre air rifle team at the 2026 ISSF World Shooting Championships
- Venue: Lusail Shooting Complex, Doha
- Dates: 3 November 2026
- Competitors: 66 from 22 nations

The men's 10 metre air rifle team event at the 2026 ISSF World Shooting Championships will be held on 3 November 2026 in Doha, Qatar. A total of 66 shooters will compete, representing 22 teams. Wang Honghao, Sheng Lihao and Wang Yutong of China are the defending champions.

== Results ==
Rank	Shooter	NOC	1	2	3	4	5	6	Total	Notes
1st place, gold medalist(s)	Ma Sihan; Sheng Lihao; Zhang Changhong	China	315.7	317.9	316.7	316.7	317.8	316.8	1901.6	
2nd place, silver medalist(s)	Petar Gorša; Miran Maričić; Josip Sikavica	Croatia	314.9	317.8	317.2	315.0	316.3	316.4	1897.6	
3rd place, bronze medalist(s)	Jon-Hermann Hegg; Henrik Larsen; Jens Oestli	Norway	314.4	313.0	316.9	316.7	317.6	315.5	1894.1	
4	Brian Baudouin; Dimitri Dutendas; Lucas Kryzs	France	315.0	317.5	314.8	313.7	316.0	314.5	1891.5	
5	Maximilian Dallinger; Daniel Bühlmeyer; Maximilian Ulbrich	Germany	314.7	313.1	317.2	314.9	314.1	315.4	1889.4	
6	Masaya Endoh; Naoki Hanakawa; Naoya Okada	Japan	314.6	314.9	313.6	314.4	313.3	316.1	1886.9	
7	Péter Somogyi; Zalán Pekler; István Péni	Hungary	315.9	313.5	312.3	314.0	313.2	316.4	1885.3	
8	Marko Ivanović; Lazar Kovačević; Aleksa Rakonjac	Serbia	311.6	313.8	313.9	314.9	315.6	314.4	1884.2	
9	Himanshu Dhillon; Paarth Makhija; Parth Mane	India	310.9	314.7	316.0	313.5	314.8	313.7	1883.6	
10	Patrick Diem; Thomas Mathis; Martin Strempfl	Austria	311.7	314.7	314.9	313.9	313.1	313.9	1882.2	
13	Filip Nepejchal; Petr Nymburský; Jiří Přívratský	Czechia	311.4	310.3	314.1	314.6	315.4	314.2	1880.0	
	Lorenzo Bacci; Edoardo Bonazzi; Danilo Sollazzo	Italy								
	Konstantin Malinovsky; Islam Satpayev; Nikita Shakhtorin	Kazakhstan								
	Kang Jun-gi; Lee Jun-hwan; Park Ha-jun	South Korea								
	Mesfer Aboud Alammari; Faez Safaq Alanazi; Bader Alotibi	Saudi Arabia								
	Ali Al-Mutairi; Turki Al-Shemeri; Saud Al-Subaiei	Kuwait								
	Tomasz Bartnik; Maciej Kowalewicz; Wiktor Sajdak	Poland								
	Ali Al-Mohannadi; Abdullah Zain Al-Sunaidi; Khalid Abdulrahman Sharshani	Qatar								
	Jesper Johansson; Victor Lindgren; Marcus Madsen	Sweden								
	Galip Berat Afal; Ömer Akgün; Mert Nalbant	Turkey								
	Sukhrobjon Mirzajonov; Javohir Sokhibov; Nikita Sokolov	Uzbekistan								
