= Shooting at the 2022 Asian Games – Men's 10 metre air rifle =

Men's 10 metre air rifle at the 2022 Asian Games
- Venue: Fuyang Yinhu Sports Centre
- Dates: 25 September 2023
- Competitors: 55 from 23 nations

Medalists
gold medal	Sheng Lihao	China
silver medal	Park Ha-jun	South Korea
bronze medal	Aishwary Pratap Singh Tomar	India

The men's 10 metre air rifle competition at the 2022 Asian Games in Hangzhou, China was held on 25 September 2023 at Fuyang Yinhu Sports Centre.

== Schedule ==
All times are China Standard Time (UTC+08:00)

Date	Time	Event
Monday, 25 September 2023	09:00	Qualification
Monday, 25 September 2023	11:30	Final

== Records ==
Prior to this competition, the existing world, Asian and Games records were as follows.

Qualification
World Record	Sheng Lihao (CHN)	637.9	Baku, Azerbaijan	12 May 2023
Asian Record	Sheng Lihao (CHN)	637.9	Baku, Azerbaijan	22 April 2018
Games Record	Yang Haoran (CHN)	632.9	Palembang, Indonesia	20 August 2018
Final
World Record	Yu Haonan (CHN)	252.8	Rio de Janeiro, Brazil	30 August 2019
Asian Record	Yu Haonan (CHN)	252.8	Rio de Janeiro, Brazil	30 August 2019
Games Record	Yang Haoran (CHN)	249.1	Palembang, Indonesia	20 August 2018

== Results ==
Legend

- DNS — Did not start

=== Qualification ===
Rank	Athlete	Series						Total	Notes
Rank	Athlete	1	2	3	4	5	6	Total	Notes
1	Sheng Lihao (CHN)	105.2	106.2	105.7	105.1	106.0	106.3	634.5	GR
2	Park Ha-jun (KOR)	104.1	105.2	105.4	106.3	106.0	105.8	632.8	
3	Rudrankksh Patil (IND)	104.8	106.1	103.8	105.5	106.7	105.6	632.5	
4	Napis Tortungpanich (THA)	105.2	106.3	105.1	104.9	106.6	103.7	631.8	
5	Aishwary Pratap Singh Tomar (IND)	104.1	105.5	105.3	105.7	105.7	105.3	631.6	
6	Nyantain Bayaraa (MGL)	105.4	104.4	105.6	104.9	105.9	104.2	630.4	
7	Du Linshu (CHN)	104.6	103.8	105.4	105.8	105.1	105.3	630.0	
8	Divyansh Singh Panwar (IND)	104.8	104.3	104.6	104.7	106.3	104.9	629.6	
9	Islam Satpayev (KAZ)	104.6	105.2	105.5	104.6	105.4	104.3	629.6	
10	Pouria Norouzian (IRI)	104.9	104.0	105.5	105.6	104.5	104.7	629.2	
11	Kim Sang-do (KOR)	104.4	105.6	104.5	105.1	105.2	104.3	629.1	
12	Amir Mohammad Nekounam (IRI)	103.8	104.3	104.8	104.6	106.1	105.2	628.8	
13	Nam Tae-yun (KOR)	103.4	105.8	105.1	105.7	104.8	103.4	628.2	
14	Masaya Endo (JPN)	104.9	103.1	105.3	105.4	104.0	105.3	628.0	
15	Javokhir Sokhibov (UZB)	104.6	106.0	104.2	104.0	105.1	103.9	627.8	
16	Atsushi Shimada (JPN)	104.6	103.9	105.2	105.2	103.6	105.2	627.7	
17	Mahyar Sedaghat (IRI)	104.0	103.7	104.9	105.0	105.1	104.9	627.6	
18	Arnab Sharar (BAN)	104.2	104.2	105.1	103.4	104.6	104.7	626.2	
19	Konstantin Malinovskiy (KAZ)	103.9	102.9	104.6	104.8	105.3	104.4	625.9	
20	Tang Hong An (SGP)	105.0	105.1	104.5	104.8	103.8	102.6	625.8	
21	Lionel Wong (SGP)	104.5	104.6	103.8	104.2	103.7	104.9	625.7	
22	Tamjid Bin Alam (BAN)	104.8	103.3	104.1	104.6	105.0	103.7	625.5	
23	Fathur Gustafian (INA)	104.3	103.6	103.9	103.5	105.4	104.4	625.1	
24	Mesfer Al-Ammari (KSA)	102.3	103.9	103.2	104.1	105.2	105.8	624.5	
25	Issam Al-Balushi (OMA)	104.8	103.7	103.7	103.5	103.8	105.0	624.5	
26	Pongsaton Panyatong (THA)	103.4	104.9	103.0	104.1	104.9	104.2	624.5	
27	Lu Shao-chuan (TPE)	103.7	105.6	104.1	103.2	104.1	103.7	624.4	
28	Robiul Islam (BAN)	104.8	103.2	103.3	104.7	103.9	104.0	623.9	
29	Yu Haonan (CHN)	105.2	103.1	104.8	102.8	103.0	104.8	623.7	
30	Chanon Binmad (THA)	102.3	104.1	103.6	104.1	104.7	104.0	622.8	
31	Ghufran Adil (PAK)	103.7	103.9	102.0	105.5	103.7	103.9	622.7	
32	Haritz Iklil Hessly Hafiz (MAS)	103.6	104.0	104.1	102.7	104.0	104.2	622.6	
33	Mahmood Haji (BRN)	102.1	104.9	104.5	103.7	103.3	103.9	622.4	
34	Batbayaryn Erkhembayar (MGL)	103.6	103.8	103.6	103.9	104.0	103.4	622.3	
35	Chen Chun-an (TPE)	103.9	102.9	104.0	104.7	102.8	103.8	622.1	
36	Ibrahim Khalil (UAE)	103.9	102.7	104.9	103.8	103.0	103.7	622.0	
37	Sung Chia-yen (TPE)	103.9	102.6	102.5	103.9	103.7	105.3	621.9	
38	Akihito Shimizu (JPN)	103.6	102.7	105.5	103.4	103.7	102.0	620.9	
39	Khaled Mohamed Al-Doseri (BRN)	104.7	103.1	101.4	103.9	103.7	103.7	620.5	
40	Davin Rosyiid Wibowo (INA)	102.7	102.4	104.2	103.9	103.6	103.2	620.0	
41	Ali Al-Mutairi (KUW)	101.3	103.7	102.2	103.5	103.6	104.0	618.3	
42	Jayson Valdez (PHI)	103.5	102.0	104.0	102.0	101.5	104.4	617.4	
43	Ali Al-Muhannadi (QAT)	102.2	103.6	103.3	104.3	101.6	102.1	617.1	
44	Aqib Latif (PAK)	101.7	102.8	101.2	103.2	104.0	103.8	616.7	
45	Husain Abduljabbar (BRN)	102.7	104.0	101.5	102.4	103.1	103.0	616.7	
46	Yuriy Yurkov (KAZ)	103.3	101.6	103.3	104.6	101.5	102.0	616.3	
47	Bader Al-Otibi (KSA)	103.7	103.4	101.6	103.9	101.7	101.5	615.8	
48	Abdullah Al-Harbi (KUW)	103.3	105.0	100.0	103.8	101.6	101.6	615.3	
49	Vadim Skorovarov (UZB)	103.9	103.4	102.4	101.4	100.4	103.6	615.1	
50	Hussain Al-Harbi (KSA)	102.9	102.2	102.8	103.0	100.9	102.7	614.5	
51	Saud Al-Subaiei (KUW)	102.1	100.3	103.3	104.1	100.8	103.0	613.6	
52	Tsedevdorjiin Mönkh-Erdene (MGL)	102.2	101.2	101.5	102.4	100.0	104.1	611.4	
53	Zeeshan Farid (PAK)	101.7	97.3	100.7	103.6	102.8	102.3	608.4	
54	Shifan Ibrahim (MDV)	98.4	102.8	101.8	99.4	101.1	99.9	603.4	
—	Abdullah Al-Sunaidi (QAT)							DNS	

=== Final ===
Rank	Athlete	1st stage		2nd stage – Elimination							S-off	Notes
Rank	Athlete	1	2	1	2	3	4	5	6	7	S-off	Notes
1st place, gold medalist(s)	Sheng Lihao (CHN)	52.2	105.3	126.9	147.8	168.6	190.0	211.0	232.3	253.3		WR
2nd place, silver medalist(s)	Park Ha-jun (KOR)	53.4	104.9	125.8	146.8	167.2	188.6	209.4	230.5	251.3		
3rd place, bronze medalist(s)	Aishwary Pratap Singh Tomar (IND)	52.0	104.5	125.4	145.7	166.8	188.0	208.7	228.8			
4	Rudrankksh Patil (IND)	51.9	104.2	125.2	145.9	166.9	187.4	208.7			SO	
5	Nyantain Bayaraa (MGL)	51.5	104.4	125.6	146.4	166.7	187.1					
6	Islam Satpayev (KAZ)	51.8	103.5	124.5	145.4	165.9						
7	Napis Tortungpanich (THA)	51.7	102.6	123.5	144.5							
8	Du Linshu (CHN)	50.8	101.7	122.9								
