= Oman at the Asian Games =

- IOC code: OMA
- NOC: Oman Olympic Committee
- Medals Ranked 37th: Gold 1 Silver 2 Bronze 5 Total 8

Summer appearances
- 1982; 1986; 1990; 1994; 1998; 2002; 2006; 2010; 2014; 2018; 2022; 2026

Oman first competed at the Asian Games in 1982.

== Medal tables ==
=== List of medalists ===
Medal	Name	Games	Sport	Event
Bronze	Mohammed Al-Malki	1986 Seoul	Athletics	Men's 400 m
Gold	Mohammed Al-Malki	1990 Beijing	Athletics	Men's 400 m
Bronze	National team	1998 Bangkok	Athletics	Men's 4 × 100 m relay
Bronze	Barakat Al-Harthi	2010 Guangzhou	Athletics	Men's 100 m
Silver	Musab Al-Hadi; Waleed Al-Kendi	2022 Hangzhou	Sailing	Men's 49er
Bronze	Husain Mohsin Al-Farsi	2022 Hangzhou	Athletics	Men's 800 metres

=== Medals by sport ===
Sport	Gold	Silver	Bronze	Total
Athletics	1	0	4	5
Sailing	0	1	0	1
Totals (2 entries)	1	1	4	6
