= Athletics at the 2022 Asian Games – Women's 1500 metres =

Women's 1500 metres at the 2022 Asian Games
- Venue: Hangzhou Olympic Expo Main Stadium
- Date: 1 October 2023
- Competitors: 17 from 14 nations

Medalists
gold medal	Winfred Yavi	Bahrain
silver medal	Harmilan Bains	India
bronze medal	Marta Yota	Bahrain

The women's 1500 metres competition at the 2022 Asian Games took place on 1 October 2023 at the HOC Stadium, Hangzhou.

== Schedule ==
All times are China Standard Time (UTC+08:00)

Date	Time	Event
Sunday, 1 October 2023	20:20	Final

== Records ==
Prior to this competition, the existing world, Asian and Games records were as follows.

World Record	Faith Kipyegon (KEN)	3:49.11	Florence, Italy	2 June 2023
Asian Record	Qu Yunxia (CHN)	3:50.46	Beijing, China	11 September 1993
Games Record	Sunita Rani (IND)	4:06.03	Busan, South Korea	10 October 2002

== Results ==
Rank	Athlete	Time	Notes
1st place, gold medalist(s)	Winfred Yavi (BRN)	4:11.65	
2nd place, silver medalist(s)	Harmilan Bains (IND)	4:12.74	
3rd place, bronze medalist(s)	Marta Yota (BRN)	4:15.97	
4	Gayanthika Abeyratne (SRI)	4:18.77	
5	Yume Goto (JPN)	4:19.45	
6	Kim Yu-jin (KOR)	4:21.92	
7	Nguyễn Thị Oanh (VIE)	4:24.19	
8	Cha Ji-won (KOR)	4:25.92	
9	K. M. Deeksha (IND)	4:27.77	
10	Chuluunkhüügiin Shinetsetseg (MGL)	4:28.41	
11	Akbayan Nurmamet (KAZ)	4:29.18	
12	Goh Chui Ling (SGP)	4:29.62	
13	Amal Al-Roumi (KUW)	4:34.55	
14	Angela Araújo (TLS)	4:37.04	
15	Phulmati Rana (NEP)	4:37.64	
16	Lodkeo Inthakoumman (LAO)	4:40.34	
17	Rabeela Farooq (PAK)	5:14.94	
