= Timor-Leste at the 2022 Asian Games =

- IOC code: TLS
- NOC: National Olympic Committee of Timor Leste

in Hangzhou, China 23 September 2023 – 8 October 2023
- Competitors: 13 (8 men and 5 women) in 9 sports
- Flag bearer: Pinto B Ana da Costa da Silva
- Medals: Gold 0 Silver 0 Bronze 0 Total 0

Asian Games appearances (overview)
- 2002; 2006; 2010; 2014; 2018; 2022; 2026

Timor-Leste competed at the 2022 Asian Games in Hangzhou, Zhejiang, China, which began on 23 September 2023 and ended on 8 October 2023. The event was scheduled to be held in September 2022 but was postponed due to the rising COVID-19 cases in China. The event was later rescheduled to be held in September–October 2023.

== Competitors ==
The following is the list of number of competitors in the Games.

Sport	Men	Women	Total
Athletics	2	2	4
Badminton	2	1	3
Beach volleyball	2	0	2
Karate	3	0	3
Shooting	0	2	2
Swimming	1	1	2
Taekwondo	2	2	4
Tennis	2	0	2
Weightlifting	1	0	1
Total	15	8	23

== Athletics ==
The Timor Leste contingent sent 4 names of athletes consisting of 2 male athletes and 2 female athletes each.

Key
- Note–Ranks given for track events are within the athlete's heat only
- Q = Qualified for the next round
- q = Qualified for the next round as a fastest loser or, in field events, by position without achieving the qualifying target
- SB = Season Best
- PB = Personal Best
- NR = National record
- N/A = Round not applicable for the event
- Bye = Athlete not required to compete in round

=== Men's ===
Athlete(s)	Event	Heat		Semifinal		Final	
Athlete(s)	Event	Result	Rank	Result	Rank	Result	Rank
Manuel Belo Amaral Ataide	800 m	1:58.62	6	—		Did not advance	
Felisberto de Deus	1500 m	3:57.66	8	—		Did not advance	
Felisberto de Deus	5000 m	—				14:43.88 SB	12

=== Women's ===
Athlete(s)	Event	Heat		Semifinal		Final	
Athlete(s)	Event	Result	Rank	Result	Rank	Result	Rank
Levanita da Costa	200 metres	28.95 PB	7	—		Did not advance	
Levanita da Costa	400 metres	1:05.16	5	—		Did not advance	
Angela Freitas	800 metres	2:16.16 PB	5	—		Did not advance	
Angela Freitas	1500 metres	—				4:37.04 PB	14

== Badminton ==
The Timor Leste contingent sent 3 names of athletes consisting of 2 male athletes and 1 female athletes each.

=== Men ===
Athlete	Event	Round of 64	Round of 32	Round of 16	Quarterfinals	Semifinals	Final	
Athlete	Event	Opposition Score	Opposition Score	Opposition Score	Opposition Score	Opposition Score	Opposition Score	Rank
Mourinho de Jesus	Singles	Bye	Lee Z J (MAS); L (0–21, 7–21)	Did not advance				
Raymond Sing	Singles	R Sok (CAM); L (9–21, 14–21)	Did not advance					
Mourinho de Jesus; Raymond Sing	Doubles	—	Liang WK/Wang C (CHN); L (9–21, 10–21)	Did not advance				

=== Women ===
Athlete	Event	Round of 64	Round of 32	Round of 16	Quarterfinals	Semifinals	Final	
Athlete	Event	Opposition Score	Opposition Score	Opposition Score	Opposition Score	Opposition Score	Opposition Score	Rank
Zoraida de Jesus	Singles	Bye	Chen YF (CHN); L (1–21, 1–21)	Did not advance				

=== Mixed ===
Athlete	Event	Round of 64	Round of 32	Round of 16	Quarterfinals	Semifinals	Final	
Athlete	Event	Opposition Score	Opposition Score	Opposition Score	Opposition Score	Opposition Score	Opposition Score	Rank
Raymond Sing; Zoraida de Jesus	Doubles	—	Tang C M/Tse Y S (HKG); L (5–21, 15–21)	Did not advance				

== Beach volleyball ==
Timor Leste entered 2 beach volleyball players (2 men's) to compete at the Games.

Athlete	Event	Preliminary		Round of 16	Quarter-finals	Semi-finals	Final / BM	
Athlete	Event	Oppositions scores	Rank	Opposition score	Opposition score	Opposition score	Opposition score	Rank
Fabricius da Cruz Correia; Joel Savio Valente	Men's tournament	Bogatu–Yokavlev (KAZ): L 0–2; Kim–Bae (KOR): W 2–0; Al Housni–Al Shereiqi (OMA): L 0–2	3	Did not advance				17

=== Pool G ===
Pos	Team	Pld	W	L	Pts	SW	SL	SR	SPW	SPL	SPR	Qualification
1	Bogatu–Yakovlev (KAZ)	3	3	0	6	6	1	6.000	135	92	1.467	Round of 16
2	Al-Housni–Al-Shereiqi (OMA)	3	2	1	5	5	2	2.500	130	93	1.398	Round of 16
3	Correia–Valente (TLS)	3	1	2	4	2	4	0.500	88	113	0.779	
4	Kim–Bae (KOR)	3	0	3	3	0	6	0.000	71	126	0.563	

Source: HAGOC

Date		Score		Set 1	Set 2	Set 3
19 Sep	Bogatu–Yakovlev (KAZ)	2–0	Correia–Valente (TLS)	21–11	21–11	
20 Sep	Correia–Valente (TLS)	2–0	Kim–Bae (KOR)	21–12	21–17	
21 Sep	Al-Housni–Al-Shereiqi (OMA)	2–0	Correia–Valente (TLS)	21–11	21–13	

== Karate ==
=== Kumite ===
Athlete	Event	Round of 32	Round of 16	Quarterfinals	Semifinals/Repechage	Final/BM	
Athlete	Event	Opposition Score	Opposition Score	Opposition Score	Opposition Score	Opposition Score	Rank
Júlio da Silva	Men's kumite -60 kg	Bye	Hamayun (PAK); W 2–0	Did not advance			
Harith Dahlan	Men's kumite -67 kg	S C Chung (TPE); L 1–10	Did not advance				
Jacob Manuel	Men's kumite -75 kg	S Phanith (CAM); L 0–4	Did not advance				
