= Pakistan at the 2022 Asian Games =

2023 sports event in Zhejiang, China

- IOC code: PAK
- NOC: Pakistan Olympic Association
- Website: www.nocpakistan.org

in Hangzhou 19 September 2023 – 8 October 2023
- Competitors: 189 in 24 sports
- Flag bearer: Nida Dar
- Medals Ranked 31st: Gold 0 Silver 1 Bronze 2 Total 3

Asian Games appearances (overview)
- 1954; 1958; 1962; 1966; 1970; 1974; 1978; 1982; 1986; 1990; 1994; 1998; 2002; 2006; 2010; 2014; 2018; 2022; 2026

Pakistan competed at the 2022 Asian Games in Hangzhou, Zhejiang, China, which was held from 23 September 2023 to 8 October 2023. Originally, the event was scheduled to be held in September 2022 but due to COVID-19 pandemic cases rising in China, the event was postponed and rescheduled to 23 September to 8 October 2023.

Pakistan sent a delegation of 189 athletes (comprising 136 male and 53 female) across 24 sports, along with 72 officials to the event.

Kishmala Talat won Pakistan its first ever Asian Games medal in shooting.

Pakistan won three medals at these games, the fewest it had ever won at the Asian Games.

== Competitors ==
Sport	Men	Women	Total
Archery	3	1	4
Athletics	13	6	19
Badminton	2	2	4
Boxing	3	1	4
Bridge	8	3	11
Cricket	15	15	30
Fencing	1	0	1
Field hockey	18	0	18
Golf	3	2	5
Kabaddi	12	0	12
Karate	2	2	4
Rowing	5	0	5
Sailing	3	2	5
Shooting	8	2	10
Sport climbing	3	2	5
Squash	4	4	8
Swimming	4	3	7
Table tennis	2	3	5
Taekwondo	4	1	5
Tennis	2	2	4
Volleyball	12	0	12
Weightlifting	3	0	3
Wrestling	4	0	4
Wushu	2	2	4
Total	136	53	189

== Medal summary ==
=== Medals by sport ===
Medals by sport
Sport	Gold	Silver	Bronze	Total
Squash	0	1	0	1
Kabaddi	0	0	1	1
Shooting	0	0	1	1
Total	0	1	2	3

=== Medals by gender ===
Medals by gender
Gender	Gold	Silver	Bronze	Total
Male	0	1	1	2
Female	0	0	1	1
Mixed/Open	0	0	0	0
Total	0	1	2	3

=== Medals by day ===
Medals by day
Day	Date	Gold	Silver	Bronze	Total
1	24 September	0	0	0	0
2	25 September	0	0	0	0
3	26 September	0	0	0	0
4	27 September	0	0	0	0
5	28 September	0	0	0	0
6	29 September	0	0	1	1
7	30 September	0	1	0	1
8	1 October	0	0	0	0
9	2 October	0	0	0	0
10	3 October	0	0	0	0
11	4 October	0	0	0	0
12	5 October	0	0	0	0
13	6 October	0	0	1	1
14	7 October	0	0	0	0
15	8 October	0	0	0	0
	Total	0	1	2	3

=== Medalists ===
Medal	Name	Sport	Event	Date
Silver	Muhammad Asim Khan; Nasir Iqbal; Noor Zaman; Farhan Zaman	Squash	Men's team	30 September
Bronze	Kishmala Talat	Shooting	Women's 10m air pistol	29 September
Bronze	Nasir Ali; Waseem Sajjad; Muhammad Nadeem Muhammad Rizwan; Abid Hussain; Waqar Ali; Tahseen Ullah; Usman Zada; Mudassar Ali; Kashif Razzaq; Muhammad Imran; Hassan Raza	Kabaddi	Men's tournament	6 October

== Archery ==
=== Recurve ===
Athlete	Event	Ranking Round		Round of 64	Round of 32	Round of 16	Quarterfinals	Semifinals	Final/Bronze Medal	
Athlete	Event	Score	Seed	Opposition Score	Opposition Score	Opposition Score	Opposition Score	Opposition Score	Opposition Score	Rank
Israr Ul Haq	Men's Individual	634	51	Jantsan G (MGL); L 2–6	Did not Advance					
Muhammed Nadeem	Men's Individual	596	76	Furukawa T (JPN); L 1–7	Did not Advance					
Idrees Majeed	Men's Individual	594	77	Did not Advance (Note: Only top 2 players from each country can advance to the final)						
Nighat Naheed	Women's Individual	459	81	Abdusattorova (UZB); L 0–6	Did not Advance					
Israr Ul Haq; Muhammad Nadeem; Idrees Majeed	Men's Team	1824	18	Did not Advance						

== Athletics ==
=== Men ===
Track Events

Athletes	Event	Heats		Semifinal		Final	
Athletes	Event	Result	Rank	Result	Rank	Result	Rank
Shajar Abbas	200 m	21.53	17	Did not Advance			
Shajar Abbas	100 m	10.59	26	Did not Advance			
Gohar Shahbaz	100 m	10.56 SB	25 Q	10.49 SB	21	Did not Advance	
Farhan Ilyas	110 m hurdles	DNF		—N/a		Did not Advance	
Abid Razzaq	400 m hurdles	51.51	18	—N/a		Did not Advance	
Muhammad Asad Ur Rehman Khan	400 m	48.60	16	—N/a		Did not Advance	
Waqas Akbar	800 m	1:53.99	14	—N/a		Did not Advance	
Waqas Akbar	1,500 m	3:58.10	15	—N/a		Did not Advance	
Sohail Amir	1,500 m	3:58.70	17	—N/a		Did not Advance	
Sohail Amir	5,000 m	—N/a				14:42.68	13
Muhammad Akhtar	5,000 m	—N/a				15:02.36	17

Field Events

Athletes	Event	Qualification		Final	
Athletes	Event	Result	Rank	Result	Rank
Sharoz Khan	High Jump	2.10 PB	12 q	2.10 =PB	12
Jaffar Ashraf	Pole Vault	—N/a		NM	11
Arshad Nadeem	Javelin Throw	—N/a		DNS	
Muhammad Yasir	Javelin Throw	—N/a		78.13	4
Muhammad Afzal	Triple Jump	—N/a		15.10	11
Muhammad Afzal	Long Jump	6.73	18	Did not Advance	

=== Women ===
Track Events

Athletes	Event	Heats		Final	
Athletes	Event	Result	Rank	Result	Rank
Arooj Kiran	100 m	12.04 PB	17	Did not Advance	
Tameen Khan	100 m	12.42	19	Did not Advance	
Tameen Khan	200 m	DSQ		Did not Advance	
Ghazala Ramzan	100 m Hurdles	15.43	15	Did not Advance	
Sahib-e-Asra	400 m	55.18	9	Did not Advance	
Rabeela Farooq	800 m	DSQ		Did not Advance	
Rabeela Farooq	1500 m	—N/a		5:14.94	17
Farhat Bano	10,000 m	—N/a		44:32.40 PB	7

== Badminton ==
Men

Athlete	Event	Round of 64	Round of 32	Round of 16	Quarterfinals	Semifinals	Final	
Athlete	Event	Opposition Score	Opposition Score	Opposition Score	Opposition Score	Opposition Score	Opposition Score	Rank
Murad Ali	Singles	Bye	Li SF (CHN); L (11–21, 11–21)	Did not Advance				
Muhammad Irfan Saeed Bhatti	Singles	Bye	K Naraoka (JPN); L (6–21, 15–21)	Did not Advance				
Murad Ali; Muhammad Irfan Saeed Bhatti	Doubles	Olonbayar / Enkhbold (MGL); W (21–18, 21–14)	Law C H / Yeung S C (HKG); L (14–21, 11–21)	Did not Advance				

Women

Athlete	Event	Round of 64	Round of 32	Round of 16	Quarterfinals	Semifinals	Final	
Athlete	Event	Opposition Score	Opposition Score	Opposition Score	Opposition Score	Opposition Score	Opposition Score	Rank
Mahoor Shahzad	Singles	Bye	Nguyễn T L (VIE); L (7–21, 10–21)	Did not Advance				
Ghazala Siddique	Singles	Goh JW (MAS); L (10–21, 4–21)	Did not Advance					
Mahoor Shahzad; Ghazala Siddique	Doubles	—N/a	Kititharakul / Prajongjai (THA); L (5–21, 7–21)	Did not Advance				

== Boxing ==
Athlete	Event	Round of 32	Round of 16	Quarterfinals	Semifinals	Final	Rank
Athlete	Event	Opposition Result	Opposition Result	Opposition Result	Opposition Result	Opposition Result	Rank
Muhammad Qasim	Men's 57 kg	Al-Zahmi (UAE); W 5–0	Ping (CHN); L 0–5	Did not Advance			
Ibrahim	Men's 63.5 kg	Bye	Al-Sarray (IRQ); L 0–5	Did not Advance			
Zohaib Rasheed	Men's 51 kg	Bye	Al Nuaimi (UAE); W 5–0	Dusmatov (UZB); L 0–5	Did not Advance		
Fatima Zahra	Women's 57 kg	—N/a	Turdibekova (UZB); L 0–5	Did not Advance			

== Bridge ==
Team

Athlete	Event	Qualification Round		Semi-finals	Finals	Rank
Athlete	Event	Points	Rank	Semi-finals	Finals	Rank
Ghalib Ali Bandesha; Muhammad Zia Hai; Masood Mazhar; Yousuf Jan Mohammad; Shahab Sarki	Men	132.92	10	Did not advance		
Anwar Mumtaz Kizilbash; Farrukh Liaqat; Arslan Mansoor; Rubina Agha; Samira Jimmy Fancy; Azra Raja	Mixed	151.21	11	Did not advance		

== Cricket ==
The Pakistan Cricket Board announced the women's squad on 25 July 2023 and the men's squad on 24 August 2023.

Team	Event	Group Stage			Quarterfinal	Semifinal	Final / BM	
Team	Event	Opposition Score	Opposition Score	Rank	Opposition Score	Opposition Score	Opposition Score	Rank
Pakistan men's	Men's tournament	Bye			Hong Kong; W 68 runs	Afghanistan; L 4 wickets	Bangladesh; L 6 wickets	4th
Pakistan women's	Women's tournament	Bye			Indonesia; W NR	Sri Lanka; L 6 wickets	Bangladesh; L 5 wickets	4th

=== Men's tournament ===
Coach
(Pakistan)
Squad

1. Qasim Akram (captain)
2. Omair Bin Yousuf (vice-captain)
3. Aamir Jamal
4. Arafat Minhas
5. Arshad Iqbal
6. Asif Ali
7. Haider Ali
8. Khushdil Shah
9. Mirza Tahir Baig
10. Mohammad Hasnain
11. Muhammad Akhlaq (wk)
12. Rohail Nazir
13. Shahnawaz Dahani
14. Sufiyan Muqeem
15. Usman Qadir

Quarter-final

3 October
14:00
Scorecard

Pakistan; 160 (20 overs)	v	Hong Kong; 92 (18.5 overs)
Aamir Jamal 41 (16); Ayush Shukla 4/49 (4 overs)		Babar Hayat 29 (26); Khushdil Shah 3/13 (4 overs)

Pakistan won by 68 runs
ZJUT Cricket Field, Hangzhou
Umpires: Masudur Rahman (BAN) and Ruchira Palliyaguruge (SRI)

- Hong Kong won the toss and elected to field.

Semi-final

6 October
14:00
Scorecard

Pakistan; 115 (18 overs)	v	Afghanistan; 116/6 (17.5 overs)
Omair Yousuf 24 (19); Fareed Ahmad 3/15 (3 overs)		Noor Ali Zadran 39 (33); Arafat Minhas 2/11 (3 overs)

Afghanistan won by 4 wickets
ZJUT Cricket Field, Hangzhou
Umpires: Ruchira Palliyaguruge (SRI) and Masudur Rahman (BAN)

- Afghanistan won the toss and elected to field.

Bronze medal match

7 October
9:00
Scorecard

Pakistan; 48/1 (5 overs)	v	Bangladesh; 65/4 (5 overs)
Mirza Tahir Baig 32* (18); Rakibul Hasan 1/12 (2 overs)		Yasir Ali 34 (16); Arshad Iqbal 3/14 (2 overs)

Bangladesh won by 6 wickets (DLS method)
ZJUT Cricket Field, Hangzhou
Umpires: Mahmood Kharoti (AFG) and Sarika Prasad (SGP)

- Bangladesh won the toss and elected to field.
- The match was initially reduced to 13 overs per side due to rain.
- Bangladesh were set a revised target of 64 runs from 5 overs due to rain.

=== Women's tournament ===
Coach
(Pakistan)
Squad

1. Nida Dar (captain)
2. Aliya Riaz
3. Anosha Nasir
4. Diana Baig
5. ~~Fatima Sana~~
6. Muneeba Ali
7. Najiha Alvi
8. Nashra Sandhu
9. Natalia Pervaiz
10. Omaima Sohail
11. Sadaf Shamas
12. Shawaal Zulfiqar
13. Sidra Ameen
14. Syeda Aroob Shah
15. Umm-e-Hani
16. Sadia Iqbal

Quarter-final

21 September
14:00
Scorecard

Pakistan	v	Indonesia

Match abandoned
ZJUT Cricket Field, Hangzhou
Umpires: Masudur Rahman (BAN) and Chris Thurgate (JPN)

- No toss.
- No play was possible due to rain.
- Pakistan won by virtue of being the higher-seeded team.

Semi-final

24 September
14:00
Scorecard

Pakistan; 75/9 (20 overs)	v	Sri Lanka; 77/4 (16.3 overs)
Shawaal Zulfiqar 16 (27); Udeshika Prabodhani 3/21 (4 overs)		Harshitha Samarawickrama 23 (41); Sadia Iqbal 1/13 (4 overs)

Sri Lanka won by 6 wickets
ZJUT Cricket Field, Hangzhou
Umpires: Masudur Rahman (BAN) and Mahmood Kharoti (AFG)

- Sri Lanka won the toss and elected to field.

Bronze Medal Match

25 September
9:00
Scorecard

Pakistan; 64/9 (20 overs)	v	Bangladesh; 65/5 (18.2 overs)
Aliya Riaz 17 (18); Shorna Akter 3/16 (4 overs)		Shorna Akter 14* (33); Nashra Sandhu 3/10 (4 overs)

Bangladesh won by 5 wickets
ZJUT Cricket Field, Hangzhou
Umpires: Ruchira Palliyaguruge (SRI) and Vrinda Rathi (IND)

- Bangladesh won the toss and elected to field.

== Fencing ==
Individual

Athlete	Event	Preliminaries							Round of 32	Round of 16	Quarterfinals	Semifinals	Final
Athlete	Event	Opposition Score	Opposition Score	Opposition Score	Opposition Score	Opposition Score	Opposition Score	Rank	Opposition Score	Opposition Score	Opposition Score	Opposition Score	Opposition Score
Mujaded Awan	Men's épée	Alimov F (UZB); L 2–5	Tin Ho NG (HKG); L 1–5	Batchuluun KE (MGL); L 1–5	Odeh I (JOR); L 2–5	Kano K (JPN); L 1–5	Almaazi M (UAE); L 0–5	32	Did not Advance				

== Field hockey ==
Pakistan men's team get directly qualified after their performance in 2018 Asian Games.

Summary

Key:

- A.E.T – After extra time.
- P – Match decided by penalty-shootout.

Team	Event	Group Stage						Semifinal	Final / BM/ Classification	
Team	Event	Opposition Score	Opposition Score	Opposition Score	Opposition Score	Opposition Score	Rank	Opposition Score	Opposition Score	Rank
Pakistan men's	Men's tournament	Singapore; W 11–0	Bangladesh; W 5–2	Uzbekistan; W 18–2	India; L 2–10	Japan; L 2–3	3	Did not Advance	Malaysia; W 5–2	5th

=== Men's tournament ===
Pool A

Pos	Team	Pld	W	D	L	GF	GA	GD	Pts	Qualification
1	India	5	5	0	0	58	5	+53	15	Semi-finals
2	Japan	5	4	0	1	36	9	+27	12	Semi-finals
3	Pakistan	5	3	0	2	38	17	+21	9	Fifth place game
4	Bangladesh	5	2	0	3	15	29	−14	6	Seventh place game
5	Uzbekistan	5	1	0	4	7	49	−42	3	Ninth place game
6	Singapore	5	0	0	5	5	50	−45	0	Eleventh place game

Source: FIH
Rules for classification: 1) points; 2) matches won; 3) goal difference; 4) goals for; 5) head-to-head result; 6) field goals for.

24 September 2023
20:45

Pakistan	11–0	Singapore
Ahmad 7', 36', 42'; Rana 17'; Liaqat 19', 27', 44'; Afraz 26'; Rehman 28'; Ammad 42'; Su. Khan 46'	Report

Umpires:
You Hyo-Sik (KOR)
Zhinan Tao (CHN)

26 September 2023
15:45

Pakistan	5–2	Bangladesh
Afraz 30'; Sh. Khan 40'; Ammad 43'; Su. Khan 48'; Ahmad 57'	Report	Khisa 19'; Mi. Hossain 46'

Umpires:
Paul Walker (ENG)
Nazmi Kamaruddin (MAS)

28 September 2023
09:00

Uzbekistan	2–18	Pakistan
Oblokulov 24'; Khudoynazarov 54'	Report	Liaqit 2'; R. Khan 2'; Ahmad 10', 20', 29', 45', 59'; Bhutta 12', 17'; Rehman 14', 53'; Sh. Khan 23'; Rana 23', 31', 42'; Afraz 29', 41', 55'

Umpires:
Khamis Al Balushi (OMA)
Chi Gang (CHN)

30 September 2023
20:45

Pakistan	2–10	India
Su. Khan 38'; Afraz 45'	Report	Mandeep 8'; Harmanpreet 11', 17', 33', 34'; Sumit 30'; Varun 41', 54'; Shamsher 46'; Lalit 49'

Umpires:
Lim Hong-Zhen (SGP)
Kamaruddin Nazmi (MAS)

2 October 2023
18:30

Japan	3–2	Pakistan
K. Tanaka 6'; Fukuda 17'; Fujishima 28'	Report	Liaqat 5'; Ahmad 28'

Umpires:
Javed Shaikh (IND)
Rawi Anbananthan (MAS)

5th place match

6 October 2023
12:45

Pakistan	5–2	Malaysia
Ahmad 8'; Rehman 37'; Rana 51'; Ammad 53'; Afraz 59'	Report	Aminudin 5'; Razie 58'

Umpires:
You Hyo-Sik (KOR)
Kinoshita Hideki (JPN)

== Golf ==
Men

Athlete	Event	Round 1	Round 2	Round 3	Round 4	Total		
Athlete	Event	Score	Score	Score	Score	Score	To Par	Rank
Omar Khalid Hussein	Individual	81	75	Did not Advance		156	+12	T67
Salman Jehangir	Individual	72	74	Did not Advance		146	+2	T48
Qasim Ali Khan	Individual	73	77	Did not Advance		150	+6	T59
Omar Khalid Hussein; Salman Jehangir; Qasim Ali Khan	Team	226	226	Did not Advance		452	+31	17

Women

Athlete	Event	Round 1	Round 2	Round 3	Round 4	Total		
Athlete	Event	Score	Score	Score	Score	Score	To Par	Rank
Parkha Ijaz	Individual	78	77	Did not Advance		155	+11	T30
Rimsha Ijaz	Individual	84	80	Did not Advance		164	+20	33
Parkha Ijaz; Rimsha Ijaz	Team	162	157	Did not Advance		319	+31	12

== Kabaddi ==
Team	Event	Group stage					Semifinal	Final	
Team	Event	Opposition Score	Opposition Score	Opposition Score	Opposition Score	Rank	Opposition Score	Opposition Score	Rank
Pakistan men	Men's tournament	Iran; L 16–43	South Korea; W 56–21	Malaysia; W 58–35	—N/a	2 Q	India; L 14–61	Did not Advance	3rd place, bronze medalist(s)

=== Men's tournament ===
Team roster

- Nasir Ali
- Waseem Sajjad
- Muhammad Nadeem
- Muhammad Rizwan
- Abid Hussain
- Waqar Ali
- Tahseen Ullah
- Usman Zada
- Mudassar Ali
- Kashif Razzaq
- Muhammad Imran
- Hassan Raza

Pool B

Pos	Team	Pld	W	D	L	PF	PA	PD	Pts	Qualification
1	Iran	3	3	0	0	160	62	+98	6	Semifinals
2	Pakistan	3	2	0	1	130	99	+31	4	Semifinals
3	Malaysia	3	1	0	2	98	149	−51	2	
4	South Korea	3	0	0	3	82	160	−78	0	

Source: Official website

2 October
14:00

Iran	43–16 (HT: 24–7)	Pakistan

Xiaoshan Guali Sports Centre, Hangzhou

3 October
15:00

Pakistan	56–21 (HT: 33–10)	South Korea

Xiaoshan Guali Sports Centre, Hangzhou

4 October
15:10

Malaysia	35–58 (HT: 10–30)	Pakistan

Xiaoshan Guali Sports Centre, Hangzhou

Semi–Final

6 October
15:00

India	61–14 (HT: 30–5)	Pakistan

Xiaoshan Guali Sports Centre, Hangzhou

== Martial arts – Karate ==
Athlete	Event	Round of 16	Quarter-final	Semifinal	Repechage	Final/BM	
Athlete	Event	Opposition Score	Opposition Score	Opposition Score	Opposition Score	Opposition Score	Rank
Hamayun	Men's kumite 60 kg	da Silva (TLS); W 2–0	Hammad (JOR); L 2–8	Did not Advance			
Muhammad Awais	Men's kumite +84 kg	Bye	Ganjzadeh (IRI); L 1–9	Did not Advance	Xayasan (LAO); W 4–0 DNS	Kangtong (THA); L 3–5	5th
Sabira Gul	Women's kumite 55 kg	Lim (CAM); L 1–5	Did not Advance				
Nisa Un Fakhra	Women's kumite 68 kg	Qiaoqiao (CHN); L 0–5	Did not Advance		Jou (TPE); L 2–3	Did not Advance	

== Martial arts – Taekwondo ==
Poomsae

Athlete	Event	Round of 16	Quarter-final	Semifinal	Final	
Athlete	Event	Opposition Score	Opposition Score	Opposition Score	Opposition Score	Rank
Aqdus Ullah Qadeer	Men's individual	Nimbu (NEP); L 0–2	Did not Advance			
Naila Akrami	Women's individual	Bukhari (KSA); W 2–0	Niwa (JPN); L 0–2	Did not Advance		

Kyorugi

Men

Athlete	Event	Round of 32	Round of 16	Quarter-final	Semifinal	Final	
Athlete	Event	Opposition Score	Opposition Score	Opposition Score	Opposition Score	Opposition Score	Rank
Haroon Khan	Flyweight	Bye	Altybaev (KGZ); L 1–2	Did not Advance			
Muhammad Arbaz Khan	Bantamweight	Bye	Hosseinpour (IRI); L 0–2	Did not Advance			
Hamzah Omar Saeed	Heavyweight	—N/a	Alahmed (QAT); W 2–0	Duisebay (KAZ); L 0–2	Did not Advance		

== Martial arts – Wushu ==
Athlete	Event	1/8 finals	Quarter-final	Semifinal	Final	
Athlete	Event	Opposition Score	Opposition Score	Opposition Score	Opposition Score	Rank
Abdul Khaliq	Men's 60 kg	Wang (CHN); L WPD	Did not Advance			
Muhammad Abdul Rehman	Men's 65 kg	Ashirov (KAZ); L WKO	Did not Advance			
Samreen Altaf	Women's 52 kg	Bye	Samiroumi (IRI); L WPD	Did not Advance		
Maira Karamat	Women's 60 kg	—N/a	Nguyen (VIE); L WKO	Did not Advance		

== Rowing ==
Men

Athlete	Event	Heat		Repechage/ Semi-final		Final	
Athlete	Event	Time	Rank	Time	Rank	Time	Rank
Zahid Iqbal Khan	Single sculls	7:34.60	3 SA/B	7:56.96	4 FB	7:44:91	11
Muzamil Shahzad; Asad Iqbal; Zahid Iqbal Khan; Amjad Baig	Quadruple sculls	6:19.86	2 R	6:27.62	6 FB	6:27.72	7
Asad Iqbal; Muzamil Shahzad	Lightweight double sculls	6:31.55	3 R	7:13.99	4 FB	6:43.84	9

== Sailing ==
Athlete	Event	Race													Total Points	Final Rank
Athlete	Event	1	2	3	4	5	6	7	8	9	10	11	12	MR	Total Points	Final Rank
Raphael Javed	Boy's ILCA 4	~~(13)~~; DNC	12	11	8	12	12	11	9	13; DSQ	7	10	—N/a		105	12
Muzammil Hassan	Men's ILCA 7	~~(14)~~; RET	10	12	10	12	11	13	11	12	10	10	—N/a		111	12
Zoya Asad Ali	Girl's ICLA 4	~~(9)~~; DNC	9 DPI	7	5	7	4	7	8	7	6	8	—N/a		68	7
Nadine Xerxes Avari; Mehboob	Mixed 470	6	~~(8)~~; UFD	6	5	7	7	7	7	6	7	7	7	7	72	7

== Shooting ==
Men

Individual

Athlete	Event	Qualification		Final	
Athlete	Event	Score	Rank	Score	Rank
Ghulam Mustafa Bashir	25-metre rapid fire pistol	583	5 Q	13	6
Gulfam Joseph	10 metre air pistol	575	17	Did not Advance	
Ghufran Adil	10 metre air rifle	622.7	31	Did not Advance	
Aqib Latif	10 metre air rifle	616.7	44	Did not Advance	
Zeeshan Farid	10 metre air rifle	608.4	53	Did not Advance	
Ghufran Adil	50-metre rifle three positions	576	22	Did not Advance	
Aqib Latif	50-metre rifle three positions	576	21	Did not Advance	
Zeeshan Farid	50-metre rifle three positions	563	43	Did not Advance	
Usman Chand	Skeet	118	12	Did not Advance	
Ahmad Usman Sadiq	Skeet	114	22	Did not Advance	
Imam Haroon	Skeet	105	35	Did not Advance	

Team

Athlete	Event	Final	
Athlete	Event	Score	Rank
Ghufran Adil; Zeeshan Farid; Aqib Latif	10 metre air rifle team	1847.8	13
Ghufran Adil; Zeeshan Farid; Aqib Latif	50-metre rifle three positions team	1715	10
Usman Chand; Imam Haroon; Ahmad Usman Sadiq	Skeet team	337	8

Women

Athlete	Event	Qualification		Final	
Athlete	Event	Score	Rank	Score	Rank
Mehak Fatima	10 metre air rifle	619.6	40	Did not Advance	
Kishmala Talat	10 metre air pistol	580 -20x	3 Q	218.2	3rd place, bronze medalist(s)
Kishmala Talat	25 metre pistol	579-20x	12	Did not Advance	

Mixed

Athlete	Event	Qualification		Final	
Athlete	Event	Score	Rank	Score	Rank
Ghufran Adil; Mehak Fatima	10 metre air rifle team	617.6	18	Did not Advance	
Gulfam Joseph; Kishmala Talat	10 metre air pistol	573	6 QB	14–16 L	5

== Sports climbing ==
Speed

Athlete	Event	Qualification		Round of 16	Quarter-finals	Semi-finals	Final	
Athlete	Event	Time	Rank	Opposition Time	Opposition Time	Opposition Time	Opposition Time	Rank
Zaheer Ahmad	Men's speed	7.717	22	Did not advance				
Mir Abuzar Faiz	Men's speed	8.398	22	Did not advance				
Zaheer Ahmad; Mir Abuzar Faiz; Fazal Wadood	Men's speed relay	29.029	9	—N/a	Did not advance			
Amani Jannat	Women's speed	14.190	17	Did not advance				
Iqra Jilani	Women's speed	24.031	18	Did not advance				

Lead and bouldering

Athlete	Event	Bouldering Qualification		Lead Qualification			Bouldering Semi-finals		Lead Semi-finals			Bouldering Final		Lead Final			Rank
Athlete	Event	Points	Rank	Hold Reached	Points	Rank	Points	Rank	Hold Reached	Points	Rank	Points	Rank	Hold Reached	Points	Rank	Rank
Zaheer Ahmad	Men's combined	4.8	23	13+	7.1	23	Did not advance										
Fazal Wadood	Men's combined	0	=24	9	3	26	Did not advance										
Amani Jannat	Women's combined	5	23	9	5	23	Did not advance										

== Squash ==
Singles

Athlete	Event	Round of 32	Round of 16	Quarterfinals	Semifinals	Final	Rank
Athlete	Event	Opposition Score	Opposition Score	Opposition Score	Opposition Score	Opposition Score	Rank
Muhammad Asim Khan	Men	Liang (SGP); W 3–1	Almezayen (KUW); L 2–3	Did not Advance			
Nasir Iqbal	Men	Theeraslip (THA); W 3–0	Altamimi (QAT); L 0–3	Did not Advance			
Noor Ul Huda Sadiq	Women	Bye	Ho (HKG); L 0–3	Did not Advance			
Noor Ul Ain Ijaz	Women	Purevjev (MGL); W 3–0	Subramaniam (MAL); L 0–3	Did not Advance			

Doubles

Athlete	Event	Group stage					Quarterfinals	Semifinals	Final	Rank
Athlete	Event	Opposition Score	Opposition Score	Opposition Score	Opposition Score	Rank	Opposition Score	Opposition Score	Opposition Score	Rank
Noor Zaman; Mehwish Ali	Mixed	Sandhu / Karthik (IND); L 0–2	Endo / Suigmoto (JPN); L 0–2	Yoo / Eum (KOR); L 0–2	—N/a	4	Did not Advance			
Farhan Zaman; Sadia Gul	Mixed	Singh / Singh (IND); L 0–2	Tang / Tong (HKG); L 0–2	Arkarahirunya / Prasertratanakul (THA); W 2–0	Pelino / Dalida (PHI); L 0–2	4	Did not Advance			

Team

Athlete	Event	Group stage						Semifinals	Final	Rank
Athlete	Event	Opposition Score	Opposition Score	Opposition Score	Opposition Score	Opposition Score	Rank	Opposition Score	Opposition Score	Rank
Muhammad Asim Khan; Nasir Iqbal; Noor Zaman; Farhan Zaman	Men	Qatar (QAT); W 3–0	Nepal (NEP); W 3–0	Singapore (SGP); W 3–0	India (IND); W 2–1	Kuwait (KUW); W 3–0	1 Q	Hong Kong (HKG); W 2–1	India (IND); L 1–2	2nd place, silver medalist(s)
Noor Ul Huda Sadiq; Mehwish Ali; Noor Ul Ain Ijaz; Sadia Gul	Women	India (IND); L 0–3	Malaysia (MAL); L 0–3	Nepal (NEP); W 3–0	Macau (MAC); L 1–2	—N/a	4	Did not Advance		

== Table tennis ==
=== Singles ===
Athlete	Event	Round of 64	Round of 32	Round of 16	Quarterfinal	Semifinal	Final	
Athlete	Event	Opposition Score	Opposition Score	Opposition Score	Opposition Score	Opposition Score	Opposition Score	Rank
Muhammad Shah Khan	Men	Alkhadrawi (KSA); L 1–4	Did not Advance					
Faizan Zahoor	Men	Bye	Lin Y-j (TPE); L 0–4	Did not Advance				
Hoor Fawad	Women	Bye	Yingsha Sun (CHN); L 0–4	Did not Advance				
Haiqa Hassan	Women	Sahakian (LBN); L 1–4	Did not Advance					

=== Doubles ===
Athlete	Event	Round of 64	Round of 32	Round of 16	Quarterfinal	Semifinal	Final	
Athlete	Event	Opposition Score	Opposition Score	Opposition Score	Opposition Score	Opposition Score	Opposition Score	Rank
Muhammad Shah Khan; Faizan Zahoor	Men	Maharjan / Kapali (NEP); W 3–0	Mahmudov / Sultonov (TJK); L 1–3	Did not Advance				
Hoor Fawad; Perniya Zaman Khan	Women	—N/a	Kim / Pyon (PRK); L 0–3	Did not Advance				
Haiqa Hassan; Muhammad Shah Khan	Mixed	Bye	Nazim / Ahmed (MDV); L 2–3	Did not Advance				
Hoor Fawad; Faizan Zahoor	Mixed	Bye	Wong / Pang (SGP); L 0–3	Did not Advance				

=== Women's tournament ===
Athlete	Group stage			Round of 16	Quarter-finals	Semifinals	Final	Rank
Athlete	Opposition Score	Opposition Score	Rank	Opposition Score	Opposition Score	Opposition Score	Opposition Score	Rank
Haiqa Hassan; Hoor Fawad; Perniya Zaman Khan	South Korea (KOR); L 0–3	Thailand (THA); L 0–3	3	Did not Advance				

22 September	South Korea	3–0	Pakistan

Jeon Ji-hee	3–0	Haiqa Hassan	11–4, 11–2, 11–2
Shin Yu-bin	3–0	Hoor Fawad	11–2, 11–4, 11–2
Suh Hyo-won	3–0	Perniya Zaman Khan	11–6, 11–4, 11–5

23 September	Thailand	3–0	Pakistan

Jinnipa Sawettabut	3–0	Haiqa Hassan	11–1, 11–4, 11–3
Tamolwan Khetkhuan	3–0	Hoor Fawad	11–5, 11–4, 11–3
Wanwisa Aueawiriyayothin	3–0	Perniya Zaman Khan	11–3, 11–5, 11–5

== Tennis – Lawn tennis ==
Singles

Athlete	Event	First round	Second round	Third round	Quarter-final	Semi-final	Final	Rank
Athlete	Event	Opposition Score	Opposition Score	Opposition Score	Opposition Score	Opposition Score	Opposition Score	Rank
Aqeel Khan	Men	Bye	Sultanov (UZB); L 0–6, 1–6	Did not Advance				
Sarah Ibrahim Khan	Women	Almudahka (QAT); W 6–2, 6–7^{(5–7)}, 6–3	Eala (PHI); L 0–6, 0–6	Did not Advance				
Ushna Suhail	Women	Tukhtaeva (TJK); W 6–2, 6–3	Lin (CHN); L 0–6, 0–6	Did not Advance				

Doubles

Athlete	Event	Round 1	Round 2	Round 3	Quarter-final	Semi-final	Final	Rank
Athlete	Event	Opposition Score	Opposition Score	Opposition Score	Opposition Score	Opposition Score	Opposition Score	Rank
Aqeel Khan; Aisam-ul-Haq Qureshi	Men	—N/a	Mendes / Ferreira (TLS); W 6–1, 6–0	Hsu / Jung (TPE); L 6–7^{(3–7)}, 4–6	Did not Advance			
Sarah Ibrahim Khan; Ushna Suhail	Women	—N/a	Enkhjargal / Ganbaatar (MGL); W 6–1, 6–1	Gumulya / Rompies (INA); L 0–6, 0–6	Did not Advance			
Sarah Ibrahim Khan; Aqeel Khan	Mixed	Gankhuyag / Batbayar (MGL); W 6–0, 6–1	Raina / Bhambri (IND); L 0–6, 0–6	Did not Advance				
Ushna Suhail; Aisam-ul-Haq Qureshi	Mixed	Bye	Plipuech / Isaro (THA); L 4–6, 1–6	Did not Advance				

== Volleyball ==
Team	Event	Group Stage			Round of 12	Quarterfinal	Semifinal	Final / BM/Classification	Rank
Team	Event	Opposition Score	Opposition Score	Rank	Opposition Score	Opposition Score	Opposition Score	Final / BM/Classification	Rank
Pakistan	Men's tournament	Mongolia; W 3–0	Chinese Taipei; W 3–0	1 Q	South Korea; W 3–0	Qatar; L 1–3	Did not advance	India; W 3–0	5

Group D

Pos	Team	Pld	W	L	Pts	SW	SL	SR	SPW	SPL	SPR	Qualification
1	Pakistan	2	2	0	6	6	0	MAX	150	113	1.327	Final round
2	Chinese Taipei	2	1	1	3	3	3	1.000	132	138	0.957	Final round
3	Mongolia	2	0	2	0	0	6	0.000	119	150	0.793	

Source: AVC

Date	Time		Score		Set 1	Set 2	Set 3	Set 4	Set 5	Total	Report
19 Sep	14:30	Pakistan	3–0	Mongolia	25–17	25–19	25–20			75–56	Report
20 Sep	10:30	Chinese Taipei	0–3	Pakistan	18–25	20–25	19–25			57–75	Report

Final Round

Date	Time		Score		Set 1	Set 2	Set 3	Set 4	Set 5	Total	Report
22 Sep	19:00	South Korea	0–3	Pakistan	19–25	22–25	21–25			62–75	Report
24 Sep	19:00	Pakistan	1–3	Qatar	24–26	19–25	25–23	18–25		86–99	Report
26 Sep	18:30	India	0–3	Pakistan	21–25	20–25	23–25			64–75	Report

== Weightlifting ==
Men

Athlete	Event	Snatch		Clean & Jerk		Total	Rank
Athlete	Event	Result	Rank	Result	Rank	Total	Rank
Furqan Anwar	81 kg	133	8	166	8	299	7
Usman Amjad Rathore	109 kg	130	9	176	8	306	8
Muhammad Abdullah Butt	+109 kg	145	7	190	6	335	6

== Wrestling ==
Key:

- VFA – Victory by Fall
- VPO – Victory by Points – without any point scored by opponent
- VPO1 – Victory by Points – with point(s) scored by opponent
- VSU – Victory by technical superiority – without any point scored by the opponent
- VSU1 – Victory by technical superiority – with point(s) scored by the opponent

=== Freestyle ===
Men

Athlete	Event	Round of 32	Round of 16	Quarterfinals	Semifinals	Repechage	Final/BM	Rank
Athlete	Event	Opposition Result	Opposition Result	Opposition Result	Opposition Result	Opposition Result	Opposition Result	Rank
Muhammad Bilal	57 kg	—N/a	Kalzhan (KAZ); L 0–10^{VPO}	Did not Advance				
Inayat Ullah	74 kg	Bye	Lu Feng (CHN); L 0–11^{VPO}	Did not Advance				
Haider Ali Butt	86 kg	Bye	Shapiev (UZB); L 0–11^{VPO}	Did not Advance				
Zaman Anwar	125 kg	Zare (IRI); L 0–10^{VPO}	Did not Advance			Buheeerdun (CHN); L 2–3^{VPO1}	Did not Advance	
