= Shooting at the 2026 Asian Games – Men's 10 metre air rifle =

Men's 10 metre air rifle at the 2026 Asian Games
- Venue: Aichi Prefectural Shooting Range
- Dates: 21 September 2026

Medalists
gold medal	Sheng Lihao	China
silver medal	Himanshu Dhillon	India
bronze medal	Rudrankksh Patil	India

The men's 10 metre air rifle competition at the 2026 Asian Games in Nagoya, Japan was held on 21 September 2026 at the Aichi Prefectural Shooting Range.

== Schedule ==
All times are Japan Standard Time (UTC+09:00)

Date	Time	Event
Monday, 21 September 2026	09:45	Qualification
Monday, 21 September 2026	12:30	Final

== Records ==
Prior to this competition, the existing world, Asian and Games records were as follows.

Qualification
World Record	Sheng Lihao (CHN)	637.9	Baku, Azerbaijan	12 May 2023
Asian Record	Sheng Lihao (CHN)	634.5	Hangzhou, China	25 September 2023
Games Record	Sheng Lihao (CHN)	634.5	Hangzhou, China	25 September 2023
Final
World Record	Danilo Sollazzo (ITA)	255.0	Ningbo, China	10 September 2025
Asian Record	Sheng Lihao (CHN)	253.3	Hangzhou, China	25 September 2023
Games Record	Sheng Lihao (CHN)	253.3	Hangzhou, China	25 September 2023

== Results ==
Legend

- DNS — Did not start

=== Qualification ===
Rank	Athlete	Series						Total	Notes
Rank	Athlete	1	2	3	4	5	6	Total	Notes
1	Sheng Lihao (CHN)	106.2	106.0	106.2	106.0	105.5	105.5	635.4	Q, QGR, QAsR
2	Ma Sihan (CHN)	105.7	105.2	104.8	106.2	106.0	105.1	633.0	Q
3	Rudrankksh Patil (IND)	104.2	106.0	105.7	105.7	105.5	104.7	631.8	Q
4	Park Ha-jun (KOR)	104.8	104.7	105.0	105.6	105.2	106.1	631.4	Q
5	Zhang Changhong (CHN)	104.0	103.5	105.4	106.2	106.9	104.6	630.6	a
6	Kanurian Al Ghozi (INA)	106.5	103.7	104.8	105.8	105.5	103.9	630.2	Q
7	Himanshu Dhillon (IND)	105.3	104.6	104.8	106.3	104.6	104.4	630.0	Q
8	Bayaraa Nyantai (MGL)	105.7	105.1	104.6	104.4	104.2	105.5	629.5	Q
9	Shin Min-ki (KOR)	104.7	104.7	105.8	104.8	103.6	105.6	629.2	Q ^{a}
10	Amirmohammad Nekounam (IRI)	104.0	104.2	105.0	105.6	104.8	105.3	628.9	
11	Parth Rakesh Mane (IND)	104.5	103.7	104.7	105.0	103.7	106.7	628.3	
12	Naoya Okada (JPN)	104.1	104.3	105.1	104.0	104.9	105.7	628.1	
13	Khalid Mohammed Ali Khalaf Al Kalbani (OMA)	103.7	102.9	104.6	105.4	104.7	106.5	627.8	
14	Anang Febrian (INA)	104.5	104.5	105.1	103.8	104.8	104.7	627.4	
15	Phung Viet Dung (VIE)	104.5	105.8	104.7	102.5	103.7	105.8	627.0	
16	Javohir Sokhibov (UZB)	104.7	104.0	102.8	105.1	104.8	105.6	627.0	
17	Masaya Endoh (JPN)	105.0	104.5	103.3	104.9	104.1	105.1	626.9	
18	Pourya Norouziyan (IRI)	104.6	105.0	104.4	103.5	104.3	104.7	626.5	
19	Erkhembayar Batbayar (MGL)	103.6	104.7	103.2	104.6	104.9	104.5	625.5	
20	Hadi Gharebaghi (IRI)	103.9	104.5	103.3	102.9	104.9	105.8	625.3	
21	Chanon Binmad (THA)	103.9	104.5	103.7	103.5	104.3	105.4	625.3	
22	Naoki Hanakawa (JPN)	105.6	104.2	105.5	103.9	103.6	102.3	625.1	
23	Fathur Gustafian (INA)	102.4	105.1	104.6	104.7	103.8	104.3	624.9	
24	Islam Satpayev (KAZ)	103.8	104.9	104.0	104.5	103.6	103.3	624.1	
25	Arnab Sharar (BAN)	102.3	104.8	105.2	104.2	103.0	104.4	623.9	
26	Nikita Shakhtorin (KAZ)	102.1	103.2	106.0	104.4	105.0	103.2	623.9	
27	Nguyen Minh Quang (VIE)	102.1	106.0	103.9	104.1	104.5	103.2	623.8	
28	Gwon Hyeop-jun (KOR)	102.9	102.7	104.7	104.9	103.6	104.8	623.6	
29	Konstantin Malinovskiy (KAZ)	104.5	101.9	105.2	103.4	104.4	104.0	623.4	
30	Patsugree Sriwichai (THA)	104.4	104.1	103.9	103.4	104.4	102.6	622.8	
31	Md Robiul Islam (BAN)	101.0	104.5	103.8	104.8	104.8	103.4	622.3	
32	Md Rabbi Hasan Munna (BAN)	103.7	102.2	102.7	103.6	104.2	104.9	621.3	
33	Nguyen Tam Quang (VIE)	103.3	101.7	102.1	104.0	103.2	105.8	620.1	
34	Napis Tortungpanich (THA)	103.7	102.2	103.7	103.9	102.2	103.4	619.1	
35	Jayson Valdez (PHI)	101.5	101.9	103.5	104.1	103.3	103.8	618.1	
36	Abdullah Zain M Alsunaidi (QAT)	104.4	103.0	103.0	100.1	102.9	103.4	616.8	
37	Khalid Abdulrahman A H Sharshani (QAT)	101.2	102.9	102.4	103.4	104.2	102.7	616.8	
38	Abdulrahman Ahmad S B Al-Sulaiti (QAT)	101.1	103.1	102.6	104.9	102.4	101.9	616.0	
39	Sainkhuu Enkhtuvshin (MGL)	101.5	102.8	104.5	103.8	102.0	100.5	615.1	
40	Maaidh Mohamed (MDV)	102.8	102.6	103.1	102.9	101.2	101.9	614.5	
41	Hamed Said Al Khatri (OMA)	99.6	102.6	101.8	103.3	103.2	102.0	612.5	
42	Salem Mohamed Rashed Khalaf Alyammahi (UAE)	99.7	102.0	101.3	103.1	103.5	102.2	611.8	
43	Umar Mohamed (MDV)	102.1	101.7	101.9	100.5	102.8	101.2	610.2	
44	S Siyovush Panjsheri (TJK)	100.1	101.6	101.1	101.7	100.0	100.1	604.6	
45	Ibrahim Shifan (MDV)	99.3	100.1	97.8	98.5	99.5	102.1	597.3	
46	Sultan Hassan (UAE)	97.7	99.4	99.4	99.9	100.0	98.8	595.2	
—	Muhammad Uzman (PAK)	Did not start						DNS	

==== Notes ====
- ^{a} Zhang Changhong did not advance to the final because Asian Games shooting regulations limit a maximum of two athletes per National Olympic Committee (NOC) to progress. His teammates Sheng Lihao (1st) and Ma Sihan (2nd) had already claimed China's two final spots.
- ^{b} Advanced to the final as a result of the two-athlete-per-NOC rule limitation on China.

=== Final ===
Rank	Athlete	5	10	12	14	16	18	20	22	24	Total	Notes
1st place, gold medalist(s)	Sheng Lihao (CHN)	52.7	104.9	126.3	147.7	168.8	190.2	211.6	233.0	254.2	254.2	AR, GR
2nd place, silver medalist(s)	Himanshu Dhillon (IND)	52.2	104.8	126.6	147.4	168.6	188.9	210.0	231.0	252.4	252.4	
3rd place, bronze medalist(s)	Rudrankksh Patil (IND)	52.8	106.0	127.4	148.2	168.6	189.7	210.6	230.9	—N/a	230.9	
4	Bayaraa Nyantai (MGL)	52.3	104.3	125.3	146.7	167.6	187.2	207.9	—N/a		207.9	
5	Ma Sihan (CHN)	52.1	103.8	124.7	146.2	166.7	187.2	—N/a			187.2	SO
6	Shin Min-ki (KOR)	52.2	104.7	125.2	146.0	166.2	—N/a				166.2	
7	Park Ha-jun (KOR)	51.4	103.4	124.7	145.7	—N/a					145.7	
8	Kanurian Al Ghozi (INA)	51.7	102.7	123.2	—N/a						123.2	
