= Badminton at the 2022 Asian Games – Men's singles =

Men's singles at the 2022 Asian Games
- Venue: Binjiang Gymnasium
- Dates: 2–7 October 2023

Medalists
| gold medal | Li Shifeng | China |
| silver medal | Shi Yuqi | China |
| bronze medal | Prannoy H. S. | India |
| bronze medal | Kodai Naraoka | Japan |

The badminton men's singles tournament at the 2022 Asian Games in Hangzhou took place from 2 to 7 October 2023 at Binjiang Gymnasium.

== Schedule ==
All times are China Standard Time (UTC+08:00)

| Date | Time | Event |
|---|---|---|
| Monday, 2 October 2023 | 10:00 | Round of 64 |
| Tuesday, 3 October 2023 | 10:00 | Round of 32 |
| Wednesday, 4 October 2023 | 10:00 | Round of 16 |
| Thursday, 5 October 2023 | 9:00 | Quarterfinals |
| Friday, 6 October 2023 | 9:00 | Semifinals |
| Saturday, 7 October 2023 | 16:45 | Gold medal match |

== Results ==
=== Seeds ===
1. Anthony Sinisuka Ginting (INA) (quarter-finals)
2. Kodai Naraoka (JPN) (semi-finals)
3. Kunlavut Vitidsarn (THA) (third round)
4. Shi Yuqi (CHN) (final)
5. Prannoy H. S. (IND) (semi-finals)
6. Li Shifeng (CHN) (champion)
7. Loh Kean Yew (SGP) (second round)
8. Jonatan Christie (INA) (second round)

=== Finals ===
Semi-finals
6 | Li Shifeng (CHN) | 21 | 21
5 | Prannoy H. S. (IND) | 16 | 9
4 | Shi Yuqi (CHN) | 21 | 21
2 | Kodai Naraoka (JPN) | 5 | 15

Final
6 | Li Shifeng (CHN) | 23 | 21
4 | Shi Yuqi (CHN) | 21 | 13

=== Top half ===
==== Section 1 ====
First round
Pui C C (MAC) | 9 | 13
J Teh (SGP) | 21 | 21
K Nishimoto (JPN) | 21 | 21
P Dahal (NEP) | 12 | 7

Second round
1 | A S Ginting (INA) | 21 | 21
Wang T-w (TPE) | 16 | 11
A Nibal (MDV) | 8 | 12
J Teh (SGP) | 21 | 21
6 | Li SF (CHN) | 21 | 21
M Ali (PAK) | 11 | 11
Jeon H-j (KOR) | 12 | 7
K Nishimoto (JPN) | 21 | 21

Third round
1 | A S Ginting (INA) | 21 | 21
J Teh (SGP) | 14 | 18
6 | Li SF (CHN) | 21 | 21
K Nishimoto (JPN) | 14 | 16

Quarter-finals
1 | A S Ginting (INA) | 13 | 17
6 | Li SF (CHN) | 21 | 21

==== Section 2 ====
First round
Lee Z J (MAS) | 15 | 21 | 21
Ng K L (HKG) | 21 | 15 | 16
J S Lhendup (BHU) | 3 | 3
D Panarin (KAZ) | 21 | 21

Second round
3 | K Vitidsarn (THA) | 17 | 21 | 21
Nguyễn H Đ (VIE) | 21 | 18 | 15
M de Jesus (TLS) | 0 | 7
Lee Z J (MAS) | 21 | 21
5 | Prannoy H. S. (IND) | 21 | 21
B Munkhbat (MGL) | 9 | 12
B A Alshannik (JOR) | 10 | 12
D Panarin (KAZ) | 21 | 21

Third round
3 | K Vitidsarn (THA) | 21 | 19 | 6
Lee Z J (MAS) | 10 | 21 | 21
5 | Prannoy H. S. (IND) | 21 | 21
D Panarin (KAZ) | 12 | 13

Quarter-finals
Lee Z J (MAS) | 16 | 23 | 20
5 | Prannoy H. S. (IND) | 21 | 21 | 22

=== Bottom half ===
==== Section 3 ====
First round
A Gurung (BHU) | 6 | 14
V Nettasinghe (SRI) | 21 | 21
Pui P F (MAC) | 13 | 14
Chou T-c (TPE) | 21 | 21
S Rikreay (CAM) | 21 | 21
R Sing (TLS) | 9 | 14

Second round
V Nettasinghe (SRI) | 21 | 21
S Enkhbat (MGL) | 8 | 16
Chou T-c (TPE) | 21 | 21
8 | J Christie (INA) | 17 | 17
S Rikreay (CAM) | 21 | 21
A Hayati (IRI) | 18 | 13
Lee C Y (HKG) | 16 | 21 | 12
4 | Shi YQ (CHN) | 21 | 18 | 21

Third round
V Nettasinghe (SRI) | 16 | 10
Chou T-c (TPE) | 21 | 21
S Rikreay (CAM) | 5 | 8
4 | Shi YQ (CHN) | 21 | 21

Quarter-finals
Chou T-c (TPE) | 18 | 12
4 | Shi YQ (CHN) | 21 | 21

==== Section 4 ====
First round
K Wangcharoen (THA) | 21 | 21
S Joshi (NEP) | 7 | 9
Lê Đ P (VIE) | 10 | 9
S Kidambi (IND) | 21 | 21

Second round
K Wangcharoen (THA) | 21 | 21
H Z Shaheed (MDV) | 3 | 5
Ng T Y (MAS) | 21 | 21
7 | Loh K Y (SGP) | 12 | 14
S Kidambi (IND) | 21 | 21
Lee Y-g (KOR) | 16 | 11
M I S Bhatti (PAK) | 6 | 15
2 | K Naraoka (JPN) | 21 | 21

Third round
K Wangcharoen (THA) | 17 | 12
Ng T Y (MAS) | 21 | 21
S Kidambi (IND) | 16 | 17
2 | K Naraoka (JPN) | 21 | 21

Quarter-finals
Ng T Y (MAS) | 20 | 15
2 | K Naraoka (JPN) | 22 | 21
