= Ma Sihan =

Chinese sport shooter (born 2008)

Personal information
- Nationality: Chinese
- Born: 1 March 2008 (age 18) Kaiyuan, Liaoning, China

Sport
- Country: China
- Sport: Shooting
- Event: 10 metre air rifle
Medal record
Men's shooting
Representing China
World Championships
Gold medal – first place	2026 Doha	10m air rifle team
Silver medal – second place	2026 Doha	10m air rifle
Asian Games
Gold medal – first place	2026 Aichi–Nagoya	10m air rifle team
Asian Championships
Gold medal – first place	2024 Jakarta	10m air rifle
Silver medal – second place	2024 Jakarta	10m air rifle team

Ma Sihan (born 1 March 2008) is a Chinese sport shooter specialising in the 10 m air rifle. His achievements include winning two medals at the Asian Championships, a gold medal at the Asian Games and two medals at World Championships.

== Career ==
In January 2024, at the Asian Rifle/Pistol Championships held in Jakarta, Indonesia, Ma won the gold medal in the 10 m air rifle, as well as a silver medal in the team event.

At the 2025 Asian Shooting Championships held in Shymkent, Kazakhstan, Ma won a bronze medal in the individual and team events, both in the junior category.

In May 2026, at the Munich round of the ISSF World Cup, Ma won a World Cup bronze medal alongside Han Jiayu. The following month, he won the mixed team event at the National Shooting Championships alongside Du Yuchen.

In September 2026, at the Asian Games held in Nagoya, Japan, Ma was part of the Chinese team that won the gold medal in the men's 10 metre air rifle team with a score of 1899.0, setting a world record in the process. He also competed in the men's 10 metre air rifle, where he finished in fifth place.

Two months later, Ma competed at the ISSF World Shooting Championships held in Doha, Qatar, where he won the silver medal in the men's 10 metre air rifle, finishing behind Sheng Lihao. He was also part of the Chinese team that won the gold medal in the men's 10 metre air rifle team.
