= Sailing at the 2022 Asian Games – Mixed Nacra 17 =

Mixed Nacra 17 at the 2022 Asian Games
- Venue: Xiangshan Sailing Centre
- Date: 21–26 September 2023
- Competitors: 10 from 5 nations

Medalists
| gold medal | Zhao Huancheng; Wang Saibo | China |
| silver medal | Justin Liu; Denise Lim | Singapore |
| bronze medal | Shibuki Iitsuka; Oura Nishida Capiglia | Japan |

The mixed Nacra 17 competition at the 2022 Asian Games was held from 21 to 26 September 2023.

== Schedule ==
All times are China Standard Time (UTC+08:00)

| Date | Time | Event |
|---|---|---|
| Thursday, 21 September 2023 | 14:00 | Race 1–3 |
| Friday, 22 September 2023 | 11:00 | Race 4–6 |
| Saturday, 23 September 2023 | 14:00 | Race 7–8 |
| Sunday, 24 September 2023 | 11:00 | Race 9–10 |
| Monday, 25 September 2023 | 14:00 | Race 11–12 |
| Tuesday, 26 September 2023 | 11:00 | Race 13–14 |

== Results ==
Legend

- DSQ — Disqualification

| Rank | Team | Race | | | | | | | | | | | | | | Total |
| Rank | Team | 1 | 2 | 3 | 4 | 5 | 6 | 7 | 8 | 9 | 10 | 11 | 12 | 13 | 14 | Total |
|---|---|---|---|---|---|---|---|---|---|---|---|---|---|---|---|---|
| 1st place, gold medalist(s) | China (CHN); Zhao Huancheng; Wang Saibo | 2 | ~~(3)~~ | 1 | 1 | 1 | 1 | 2 | 3 | 1 | 1 | 1 | 2 | 1 | 1 | 18 |
| 2nd place, silver medalist(s) | Singapore (SGP); Justin Liu; Denise Lim | 1 | 1 | 2 | 3 | 2 | 3 | 1 | 1 | 2 | ~~(4)~~ | 4 | 3 | 2 | 3 | 28 |
| 3rd place, bronze medalist(s) | Japan (JPN); Shibuki Iitsuka; Oura Nishida Capiglia | 4 | 4 | 4 | 2 | 3 | 2 | ~~(5)~~ | 4 | 3 | 2 | 2 | 1 | 4 | 2 | 37 |
| 4 | India (IND); Siddheshwar Doiphode; Ramya Saravanan | 3 | 2 | 3 | 4 | ~~(6)~~; DSQ | 4 | 4 | 2 | 4 | 3 | 3 | 4 | 5 | 4 | 45 |
| 5 | Thailand (THA); Teerapong Watiboonruang; Siriwimon Harintachat | ~~(5)~~ | 5 | 5 | 5 | 4 | 5 | 3 | 5 | 5 | 5 | 5 | 5 | 3 | 5 | 60 |
