= Athletics at the 2022 Asian Games – Women's 800 metres =

Women's 800 metres at the 2022 Asian Games
- Venue: Hangzhou Olympic Expo Main Stadium
- Date: 3–4 October 2023
- Competitors: 20 from 16 nations

Medalists
| gold medal | Tharushi Karunarathna | Sri Lanka |
| silver medal | Harmilan Bains | India |
| bronze medal | Wang Chunyu | China |

The women's 800 metres competition at the 2022 Asian Games took place on 3 and 4 October 2023 at the HOC Stadium, Hangzhou.

== Schedule ==
All times are China Standard Time (UTC+08:00)

| Date | Time | Event |
|---|---|---|
| Tuesday, 3 October 2023 | 09:10 | Round 1 |
| Wednesday, 4 October 2023 | 19:25 | Final |

== Records ==
Prior to this competition, the existing world, Asian and Games records were as follows.

| World Record | Jarmila Kratochvílová (TCH) | 1:53.28 | Munich, West Germany | 26 July 1983 |
| Asian Record | Liu Dong (CHN) | 1:55.54 | Beijing, China | 9 September 1993 |
| Games Record | Margarita Mukasheva (KAZ) | 1:59.02 | Incheon, South Korea | 1 October 2014 |

== Results ==
Legend

- DSQ — Disqualified

=== Round 1 ===
- Qualification: First 2 in each heat (Q) and the next 2 fastest (q) advance to the final.

==== Heat 1 ====
| Rank | Athlete | Time | Notes |
|---|---|---|---|
| 1 | K. M. Chanda (IND) | 2:07.38 | Q |
| 2 | Rao Xinyu (CHN) | 2:07.77 | Q |
| 3 | Nguyễn Thị Thu Hà (VIE) | 2:08.06 | |
| 4 | Zuunnastyn Gankhishig (MGL) | 2:12.75 | |
| 5 | Fasuhaa Ahmed (MDV) | 2:20.66 | |
| — | Goh Chui Ling (SGP) | DSQ | |

==== Heat 2 ====
| Rank | Athlete | Time | Notes |
|---|---|---|---|
| 1 | Harmilan Bains (IND) | 2:06.62 | Q |
| 2 | Marta Yota (BRN) | 2:06.85 | Q |
| 3 | Gayanthika Abeyratne (SRI) | 2:07.17 | q |
| 4 | Akbayan Nurmamet (KAZ) | 2:12.33 | |
| 5 | Angela Araújo (TLS) | 2:16.16 | |
| 6 | Phulmati Rana (NEP) | 2:22.59 | |
| — | Rabeela Farooq (PAK) | DSQ | |

==== Heat 3 ====
| Rank | Athlete | Time | Notes |
|---|---|---|---|
| 1 | Wang Chunyu (CHN) | 2:05.37 | Q |
| 2 | Tharushi Karunarathna (SRI) | 2:05.48 | Q |
| 3 | Ayano Shiomi (JPN) | 2:06.37 | q |
| 4 | Amal Al-Roumi (KUW) | 2:13.20 | |
| 5 | Cha Ji-won (KOR) | 2:13.53 | |
| 6 | Chuluunkhüügiin Shinetsetseg (MGL) | 2:13.82 | |
| 7 | Haneen Yacoub (PLE) | 2:28.73 | |

=== Final ===
| Rank | Athlete | Time | Notes |
|---|---|---|---|
| 1st place, gold medalist(s) | Tharushi Karunarathna (SRI) | 2:03.20 | |
| 2nd place, silver medalist(s) | Harmilan Bains (IND) | 2:03.75 | |
| 3rd place, bronze medalist(s) | Wang Chunyu (CHN) | 2:03.90 | |
| 4 | Rao Xinyu (CHN) | 2:04.16 | |
| 5 | Ayano Shiomi (JPN) | 2:05.21 | |
| 6 | Marta Yota (BRN) | 2:05.65 | |
| 7 | K. M. Chanda (IND) | 2:05.69 | |
| 8 | Gayanthika Abeyratne (SRI) | 2:05.87 | |
