= Harmilan Bains =

Indian athlete (born 1998)

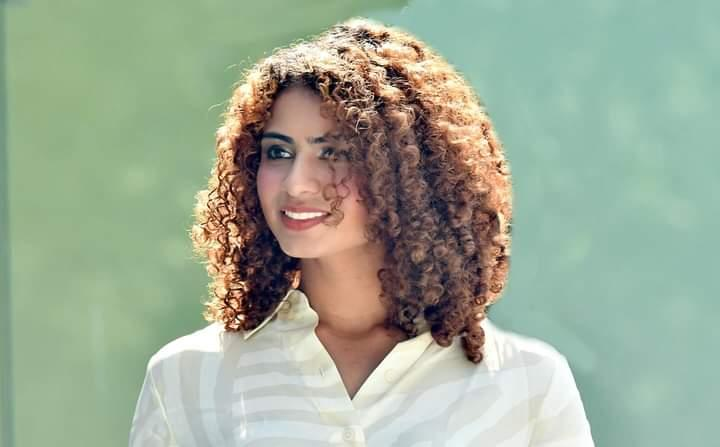

Personal information
- Full name: Harmilan Kaur Bains
- Nickname: The Queen
- Born: 23 July 1998 (age 28) Hoshiarpur, Punjab, India
- Height: 168 cm (5 ft 6 in)

Sport
- Sport: Athletics; Track and field
- Events: 800 m; 1500 m; 3000 m

Achievements and titles
- Personal bests: 800 m; 2:03.06 (2023); 1500 m; 4:05.39 (2023); 3000 m; 9:01.30 (2023)
Medal record
Women's athletics
Representing India
Asian Games
Silver medal – second place	2022 Hangzhou	800 m
Silver medal – second place	2022 Hangzhou	1500 m
Asian Indoor Championships
Gold medal – first place	2024 Tehran	1500 m

Harmilan Bains (born 23 July 1998 in Hoshiarpur, Punjab, India) is an Indian track athlete. She is a double silver medalist in the 800m and 1500m events at the Asian Games. She is a gold medalist at the Asian Indoor Championships. Bains was the national record holder in the 1500m event before K. M. Deeksha broke it.

== Early life ==
Bains hails from Hoshiarpur, Punjab. She completed her schooling at Doaba Public School, Mahilpur and Saint Soldier School, Hoshiarpur. Her parents are both athletes. Her father Amandeep Bains won a 1500m medal at the South Asian Games and her mother Madhuri Singh, won silver in 800m at the 2002 Asian Games. Her mother was also an Arjuna Awardee in 2003.

== Career ==
- 2023: Harmilan won the silver medal in the 1500m at the 2022 Asian Games in Hangzhou, China.
- 2021: She clocked 4:05.39 in 1500m at the National Open Championships 2021 in Warangal to set a new National Record erasing Sunita Rani's 2002 record of 4:06.03.

== MTV Roadies ==
In 2026, Bains participated in the popular Indian youth adventure and entertainment reality TV series, MTV Roadies Rebirth, as a contestant.
