= Eabad Ali =

Indian sailor

Personal information
- Nationality: India
- Born: 16 April 1994 (age 32)

Sailing career
- Sport: Sailing
Medal record
Men's sailing
Representing India
Asian Games
Bronze medal – third place	2022 Hangzhou	Men's Windsurfer RS:X

Eabad Ali (born 16 April 1994) is an Indian sailor. He won the bronze medal at 2022 Asian Games in the Men's Windsurfer RS:X event.
