= Oman at the 2026 Asian Games =

- IOC code: OMA
- NOC: Oman Olympic Committee

in Aichi–Nagoya, Japan September 19 – October 4, 2026
- Medals Ranked 34th: Gold 0 Silver 1 Bronze 1 Total 2

Asian Games appearances (overview)
- 1982; 1986; 1990; 1994; 1998; 2002; 2006; 2010; 2014; 2018; 2022; 2026

Oman competed at the 2026 Asian Games in Aichi Prefecture and Nagoya, Japan from September 19 to October 4, 2026.

== Field hockey ==
Summary

Key:

- s.o. – Match decided by Penalty shoot-out.

Team	Event	Group stage						Semifinal	Final / BM / Pl	
Team	Event	Opposition Score	Opposition Score	Opposition Score	Opposition Score	Opposition Score	Rank	Opposition Score	Opposition Score	Rank
Oman men's	Men's tournament	China; L 0–2	Malaysia; L 0–7	Uzbekistan; L 2–3	Thailand; L 0–1	Pakistan; L 2–7	6	Did not advance	Indonesia; D 3–3 (3–2 s.o.)	11

=== Men's tournament ===
Team squads

The following is the Oman roster in the men's field hockey tournament of the 2026 Asian Games.

Head coach: (Oman) Mohammed Bait Jandal

1. Aliyas Al-Noufali
2. Asama Barazahan
3. Shamaiaa Akram Bait
5. Usama Bait
6. Khalid Al-Shaaibi (C)
10. Aiman Madit
11. Mohammed Al-Noufali
13. Alkhoder Al-Noufali
14. Sanad Sbeit
15. Fisal Alloun
16. Maitham Al-Wahaibi
17. Aseel Al-Maaini
19. Khalid Al-Hasni
20. Fahad Al-Lawati
22. Ahmed Al-Naabi (GK)
23. Rashad Al-Fazari (C)
25. Rashid Al-Alawi
26. Ibrahim Al-Farsi (GK)
28. Said Al-Fazari
30. Al Baraa Al-Nofli

Preliminary round

Pos	Team	Pld	W	D	L	GF	GA	GD	Pts	Qualification
1	Malaysia	5	5	0	0	34	4	+30	15	Semi-finals
2	Pakistan	5	4	0	1	28	8	+20	12	Semi-finals
3	China	5	3	0	2	13	10	+3	9	Fifth place classification
4	Thailand	5	2	0	3	5	28	−23	6	Fifth place classification
5	Uzbekistan	5	1	0	4	6	20	−14	3	Ninth place game
6	Oman	5	0	0	5	4	20	−16	0	Eleventh place game

Source: FIH
Rules for classification: 1) points; 2) matches won; 3) goal difference; 4) goals for; 5) head-to-head result; 6) field goals for.

18 September 2026
09:00

China	2–0	Oman
Gao 23'; Du 35'	Report

Gifu Prefectural Green Stadium
Umpires:
Coen van Bunge (NED)
Sean Rapaport (RSA)

22 September 2026
15:00

Malaysia	7–0	Oman
Fa. Saari 3', 43'; Rozemi 17'; Azrai 24', 57'; Silverius 30'; Anuar 57'	Report

Gifu Prefectural Green Stadium
Umpires:
Deepak Joshi (IND)
Mohammad Shahbaz Ali (BAN)

24 September 2026
13:00

Oman	2–3	Uzbekistan
Al-Hasni 38'; Al-Fazari 45+'	Report	Husanov 36', 53'; Khakimov 54'

Gifu Prefectural Green Stadium
Umpires:
Mohammad Shahbaz Ali (BAN)
James Unkles (AUS)

26 September 2026
09:00

Oman	0–1	Thailand
	Report	Juntakian 57'

Gifu Prefectural Green Stadium
Umpires:
Akalanka Ishan Kumara (SRI)
Kim Yoon-seon (KOR)

28 September 2026
15:00

Pakistan	7–2	Oman
Khan 22', 28'; Rana 34', 44', 59'; Ali 40'; Ammad 46'	Report	Al-Nofli 28'; Madit 36'

Gifu Prefectural Green Stadium
Umpires:
Akalanka Ishan Kumara (SRI)
Khalid Hussain (HKG)

Eleventh place match

1 October 2026
09:00

Indonesia	3–3	Oman
Alam 11'; Muhamad 45+'; Al Ardh 56'	Report; SO Report	Barazahan 24'; M. Al-Noufali 29'; Madit 50'
Penalties
Guntara (penalty shoot-out scored); Muhamad (penalty shoot-out missed); Asasi (penalty shoot-out missed); Fathur (penalty shoot-out scored); Firdaus (penalty shoot-out missed)	2–3	(penalty shoot-out scored) A. Al-Noufali; (penalty shoot-out missed) Al-Fazari; (penalty shoot-out scored) Al-Fazari; (penalty shoot-out missed) Al-Wahaibi; (penalty shoot-out scored) Barazahan

Gifu Prefectural Green Stadium
Umpires:
Haroon Rashid (PAK)
Mohammad Shahbaz Ali (BAN)

== Shooting ==
Men

Athlete	Event	Qualification		Final	
Athlete	Event	Points	Rank	Points	Rank
Salim Al-Hinai	10 m air pistol	565-10x	42	Did not advance	
Yaqoob Al-Siyabi	25 m rapid fire pistol				
Hamed Said Al-Khatri	10 m air rifle	612.5	41	Did not advance	
Hamed Said Al-Khatri	50 m rifle 3 position	578-25x	21	Did not advance	
Khalid Al-Kalbani	10 m air rifle	627.8	13	Did not advance	
Bati Al-Shibli	Trap				
Naghmush Al-Hattali	Skeet	104	41	Did not advance	

Women

Athlete	Event	Qualification		Final	
Athlete	Event	Points	Rank	Points	Rank
Al Anoud Al-Khalili	10 m air rifle	619.3	43	Did not advance	
Al Anoud Al-Khalili	50 m rifle 3 position	567-14x	42	Did not advance	
Amina Al-Tarshi	10 m air rifle	614.9	49	Did not advance	
Amina Al-Tarshi	50 m rifle 3 position	561-18x	43	Did not advance	

Mixed team

Athlete	Event	Qualification		Final	
Athlete	Event	Points	Rank	Points	Rank
Al Anoud Al-Khalili; Khalid Al-Kalbani	10 m air rifle	628.3	6	Did not advance	
