= Keiju Okada =

Japanese sailor (born 1995)

Personal information
- Nationality: Japanese
- Born: 2 December 1995 (age 30) Kitakyushu, Japan

Sailing career
- Sport: Sailing
- Classes: 470, 420, ILCA 4, Optimist
Medal record
Men's Sailing
Representing Japan
Olympic Games
Silver medal – second place	2024 Paris	470 mixed
Asian Games
Gold medal – first place	2022 Hangzhou	470 mixed

Keiju Okada (Japanese: 岡田奎樹, Okada Keiju, born 2 December 1995) is a Japanese sailor. He competed in the men's 470 event at the 2020 Summer Olympics.
