= Athletics at the 2022 Asian Games – Men's 5000 metres =

Men's 5000 metres at the 2022 Asian Games
- Venue: Hangzhou Olympic Expo Main Stadium
- Date: 4 October 2023
- Competitors: 20 from 15 nations

Medalists
gold medal	Birhanu Balew	Bahrain
silver medal	Avinash Sable	India
bronze medal	Dawit Fikadu	Bahrain

The men's 5000 metres competition at the 2022 Asian Games took place on 4 October 2023 at the HOC Stadium, Hangzhou.

== Schedule ==
All times are China Standard Time (UTC+08:00)

Date	Time	Event
Wednesday, 4 October 2023	19:40	Final

== Records ==
Prior to this competition, the existing world, Asian and Games records were as follows.

World Record	Joshua Cheptegei (UGA)	12:35.36	Monaco	14 August 2020
Asian Record	Albert Rop (BRN)	12:51.96	Monaco	19 July 2013
Games Record	Mohamad Al-Garni (QAT)	13:26.13	Incheon, South Korea	27 September 2014

== Results ==
Legend

- DNS — Did not start

Rank	Athlete	Time	Notes
1st place, gold medalist(s)	Birhanu Balew (BRN)	13:17.40	GR
2nd place, silver medalist(s)	Avinash Sable (IND)	13:21.09	
3rd place, bronze medalist(s)	Dawit Fikadu (BRN)	13:25.63	
4	Gulveer Singh (IND)	13:29.93	
5	Mohamad Al-Garni (QAT)	13:37.49	
6	Keita Sato (JPN)	13:39.18	
7	Zhaxi Ciren (CHN)	13:56.57	
8	Tariq Al-Amri (KSA)	14:02.94	
9	Yaser Bagharab (QAT)	14:03.25	
10	Baek Seung-ho (KOR)	14:17.87	
11	Gopi Chandra Parki (NEP)	14:22.15	
12	Robi Syianturi (INA)	14:24.04	
13	Sohail Amir (PAK)	14:42.68	
14	Narandulamyn Mönkhbayar (MGL)	14:42.79	
15	Felisberto de Deus (TLS)	14:43.88	
16	Bat-Ochiryn Ser-Od (MGL)	14:48.33	
17	Muhammad Akhtar (PAK)	15:02.36	
18	Ouk Rohit (CAM)	15:38.56	
—	Hossein Keyhani (IRI)	DNS	
—	Kieran Tuntivate (THA)	DNS	
