= Parth Mane =

Indian sport shooter (born 2007)

Personal information
- Full name: Parth Rakesh Mane
- Born: 13 November 2007 (age 18) Solapur, Maharashtra, India

Sport
- Sport: Shooting
- Event: 10 m air rifle
Medal record
Men's 10 m air rifle shooting
Representing India
Asian Games
Silver medal – second place	2026 Aichi–Nagoya	Team

Parth Rakesh Mane (13 November 2007) is an Indian sport shooter specialising in the 10 m air rifle. He is selected to represent India at the 2026 Asian Games in September 2026.

Mane is from Solapur, Maharashtra.

== Career ==
In October 2024, Mane became the Junior World champion in the men's 10m air rifle winning the final in the ISSF Junior World Championshps at Lima, Peru. In 2023, he represented India in the ISSF Junior World Championshps at Changwon and finished sixth in the 10m air rifle mixed team junior event.

In 2024, he won a silver medal in the 10m air rifle men's junior event at Granada. In January 2025, he won the gold medal in the 10m air rifle event at the National Games in Dehradun.

In May 2026, in his senior World Cup debut, Mane finished seventh in the men's 10m air rifle competition at the ISSF World Cup in Munich.
