= Miho Yoshioka =

Japanese sailor (born 1990)

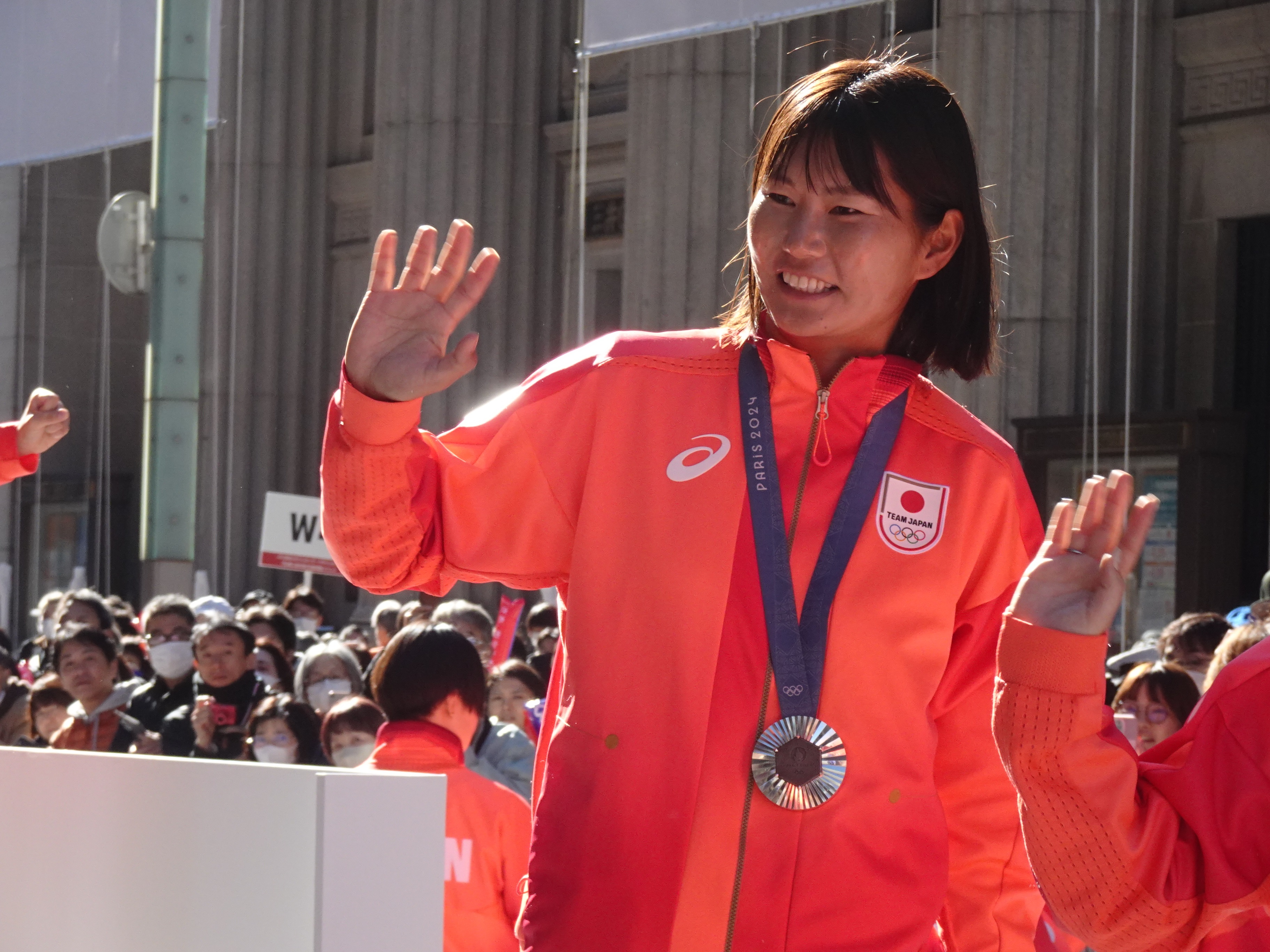

Personal information
- Nationality: Japanese
- Born: 27 August 1990 (age 36) Fujisawa, Kanagawa, Japan
- Height: 177 cm (5 ft 10 in)
- Weight: 68 kg (150 lb)

Sailing career
- Sport: Sailing
- Class: 470
Medal record
Women's sailing
Representing Japan
Olympic Games
Silver medal – second place	2024 Paris	470 mixed
World Championships
Gold medal – first place	2018 Aarhus	470
Silver medal – second place	2019 Enoshima	470
Asian Games
Gold medal – first place	2018 Jakarta-Palembang	470
Gold medal – first place	2022 Hangzhou	470 mixed

Miho Yoshioka (吉岡 美帆, Yoshioka Miho; born 27 August 1990) is a Japanese competitive sailor. She competed at the 2016 Summer Olympics in Rio de Janeiro, in the women's 470 class.

== Sailing Career ==
=== Partnership with Ai Yoshida (Women's 470) ===
Yoshioka partnered with Ai Yoshida to compete in the women's 470 class. The pair made their Olympic debut at the 2016 Summer Olympics in Rio, where they finished in fifth place.

In 2018, Yoshioka and Yoshida made history by becoming the first Japanese duo to win a gold medal at the Sailing World Championships, which were held in Aarhus, Denmark. They followed this with a silver medal at the 2019 World Championships in Beijing.

The duo competed in their home waters at the 2020 Summer Olympics in Tokyo, finishing in seventh place.

=== Partnership with Keiju Okada (Mixed 470) ===
Following the merger of the men's and women's 470 events into a single mixed 470 class for the Paris 2024 Olympics, Yoshioka began campaigning with Keiju Okada.

The new pairing found success quickly, winning a gold medal at the 2023 Allianz Sailing World Championships in The Hague. That same year, they also won gold at the Asian Games and the Trofeo Princesa Sofia regatta. In 2024, they secured a bronze medal at the 470 World Championships.

== Personal life ==
Yoshioka grew up in Hyogo Prefecture. Before discovering sailing at the age of 15, she primarily played indoor sports, including volleyball. She attended Ritsumeikan University.
