= Cho Won-woo (windsurfer) =

South Korean windsurfer (born 1994)

Personal information
- Born: 29 October 1994 (age 31) Busan, South Korea
- Height: 1.80 m (5 ft 11 in)

Sport
- Country: South Korea
- Sport: Sailing
Medal record
Asian Games
Gold medal – first place	2022 Hangzhou	RS:X

Cho Won-woo (Korean: 조원우, also known as Cho Won-wu, born 29 October 1994) is a South Korean sport sailor. He competed in the 2020 Summer Olympics.
