= Sailing at the 2022 Asian Games – Boys' ILCA 4 =

Boys' ILCA 4 at the 2022 Asian Games
- Venue: Xiangshan Sailing Centre
- Date: 21–26 September 2023
- Competitors: 12 from 12 nations

Medalists
gold medal	Weka Bhanubandh	Thailand
silver medal	Isaac Goh	Singapore
bronze medal	Asnawi Iqbal Adam	Malaysia

The Boys' ILCA 4 competition at the 2022 Asian Games was held from 21 to 26 September 2023 at Xiangshan Sailing Centre in Ningbo. It was a youth event and sailors born in or after 2006 were eligible to participate.

== Schedule ==
All times are China Standard Time (UTC+08:00)

Date	Time	Event
Thursday, 21 September 2023	11:00	Race 1–2
Friday, 22 September 2023	14:10	Race 3–4
Saturday, 23 September 2023	11:00	Race 5–6
Sunday, 24 September 2023	14:10	Race 7–8
Monday, 25 September 2023	14:00	Race 9–10
Tuesday, 26 September 2023	11:10	Race 11

== Results ==
Legend

- DNC — Did not come to the starting area
- DNE — Non-excludable disqualification
- DSQ — Disqualification
- RET — Retired
- UFD — U flag disqualification

Rank	Athlete	Race											Total
Rank	Athlete	1	2	3	4	5	6	7	8	9	10	11	Total
1st place, gold medalist(s)	Weka Bhanubandh (THA)	1	1	1	2	~~(6)~~	1	2	1	1	1	2	13
2nd place, silver medalist(s)	Isaac Goh (SGP)	2	2	2	1	3	3	1	2	~~(9)~~	4	1	21
3rd place, bronze medalist(s)	Asnawi Iqbal Adam (MAS)	6	5	7	3	1	6	7	3	2	2	~~(9)~~	42
4	Mohamed Al-Zaabi (UAE)	4	3	4	4	~~(7)~~	2	5	6	6	6	5	45
5	Chan Kin Chung (HKG)	3	4	5	5	~~(10)~~	5	6	5	4	5	6	48
6	Kim Jong-hwi (KOR)	7	7	~~(9)~~	7	2	4	3	4	7	9	8	58
7	Abdullatif Al-Qasmi (OMA)	8	8	6	9	4	8	4	~~(13)~~; UFD	10	8	3	68
8	Adhvait Menon (IND)	5	6	3	~~(13)~~; DSQ	8	10	10	13; UFD	5	3	13; RET	76
9	Khalifa Duaij Al-Doseri (BRN)	10	9	8	6	5	9	12	~~(13)~~; DSQ	8	13; DNE	4	84
10	Ahmed Al-Mulla (QAT)	9	10	~~(13)~~; DSQ	10	9	7	8	8	11	11	7	90
11	Tharen Nanayakkara (SRI)	~~(11)~~	11	10	11	11	11	9	7	3	10	11	94
12	Raphael Javed (PAK)	~~(13)~~; DNC	12	11	8	12	12	11	9	13; DSQ	7	10	105
