= Shooting at the 2026 Asian Games – Men's 10 metre air rifle team =

Men's 10 metre air rifle team at the 2026 Asian Games
- Venue: Aichi Pref. General Shooting Gallery
- Dates: 21 September 2026
- Competitors: 39 from 13 nations

Medalists
| gold medal | China; Ma Sihan, Sheng Lihao, Zhang Changhong |
| silver medal | India; Himanshu Dhillon, Parth Rakesh Mane, Rudrankksh Balasaheb Patil |
| bronze medal | South Korea; Gwon Hyeop-jun, Park Ha-jun, Shin Min-ki |

The men's 10 metre air rifle team competition at the 2026 Asian Games in Nagoya, Japan was held on 21 September 2026 at the Aichi Pref. General Shooting Gallery.

== Schedule ==
All times are Japan Standard Time (UTC+09:00)

| Date | Time | Event |
|---|---|---|
| Monday, 21 September 2026 | 09:45 | Final |

== Records ==
Prior to this competition, the existing world, Asian and Games records were as follows.

| World Record | China; Wang Honghao, Sheng Lihao, Wang Yutong | 1898.4 | Cairo, Egypt | 8 November 2025 |
| Asian Record | India; Divyansh Singh Panwar, Rudrankksh Patil, Aishwary Pratap Singh Tomar | 1893.7 | Hangzhou, China | 25 September 2023 |
| Games Record | India; Divyansh Singh Panwar, Rudrankksh Patil, Aishwary Pratap Singh Tomar | 1893.7 | Hangzhou, China | 25 September 2023 |

== Results ==
The final classification is determined by the total sum of all individual qualification series scores logged across the three registered members of each nation.

| Rank | Team | Series | | | | | | Total | Notes |
| Rank | Team | 1 | 2 | 3 | 4 | 5 | 6 | Total | Notes |
|---|---|---|---|---|---|---|---|---|---|
| 1st place, gold medalist(s) | China (CHN) | 315.9 | 314.7 | 316.4 | 318.4 | 318.4 | 315.2 | 1899.0 | WR |
| | Ma Sihan | 105.7 | 105.2 | 104.8 | 106.2 | 106.0 | 105.1 | 633.0 | |
| | Sheng Lihao | 106.2 | 106.0 | 106.2 | 106.0 | 105.5 | 105.5 | 635.4 | |
| | Zhang Changhong | 104.0 | 103.5 | 105.4 | 106.2 | 106.9 | 104.6 | 630.6 | |
| 2nd place, silver medalist(s) | India (IND) | 314.0 | 314.3 | 315.2 | 317.0 | 313.8 | 315.8 | 1890.1 | |
| | Himanshu Dhillon | 105.3 | 104.6 | 104.8 | 106.3 | 104.6 | 104.4 | 630.0 | |
| | Parth Rakesh Mane | 104.5 | 103.7 | 104.7 | 105.0 | 103.7 | 106.7 | 628.3 | |
| | Rudrankksh Balasaheb Patil | 104.2 | 106.0 | 105.7 | 105.7 | 105.5 | 104.7 | 631.8 | |
| 3rd place, bronze medalist(s) | South Korea (KOR) | 312.4 | 312.1 | 315.5 | 315.3 | 312.4 | 316.5 | 1884.2 | |
| | Gwon Hyeop-jun | 102.9 | 102.7 | 104.7 | 104.9 | 103.6 | 104.8 | 623.6 | |
| | Park Ha-jun | 104.8 | 104.7 | 105.0 | 105.6 | 105.2 | 106.1 | 631.4 | |
| | Shin Min-ki | 104.7 | 104.7 | 105.8 | 104.8 | 103.6 | 105.6 | 629.2 | |
| 4 | Indonesia (INA) | 313.4 | 313.3 | 314.5 | 314.3 | 314.1 | 312.9 | 1882.5 | |
| | Anang Febrian | 104.5 | 104.5 | 105.1 | 103.8 | 104.8 | 104.7 | 627.4 | |
| | Kanurian Al Ghozi | 106.5 | 103.7 | 104.8 | 105.8 | 105.5 | 103.9 | 630.2 | |
| | Fathur Gustafian | 102.4 | 105.1 | 104.6 | 104.7 | 103.8 | 104.3 | 624.9 | |
| 5 | Iran (IRI) | 312.5 | 313.7 | 312.7 | 312.0 | 314.0 | 315.8 | 1880.7 | |
| | Hadi Gharebaghi | 103.9 | 104.5 | 103.3 | 102.9 | 104.9 | 105.8 | 625.3 | |
| | Amirmohammad Nekounam | 104.0 | 104.2 | 105.0 | 105.6 | 104.8 | 105.3 | 628.9 | |
| | Pourya Norouziyan | 104.6 | 105.0 | 104.4 | 103.5 | 104.3 | 104.7 | 626.5 | |
| 6 | Japan (JPN) | 314.7 | 313.0 | 313.9 | 312.8 | 312.6 | 313.1 | 1880.1 | |
| | Masaya Endoh | 105.0 | 104.5 | 103.3 | 104.9 | 104.1 | 105.1 | 626.9 | |
| | Naoki Hanakawa | 105.6 | 104.2 | 105.5 | 103.9 | 103.6 | 102.3 | 625.1 | |
| | Naoya Okada | 104.1 | 104.3 | 105.1 | 104.0 | 104.9 | 105.7 | 628.1 | |
| 7 | Kazakhstan (KAZ) | 310.4 | 310.0 | 315.2 | 312.3 | 313.0 | 310.5 | 1871.4 | |
| | Konstantin Malinovskiy | 104.5 | 101.9 | 105.2 | 103.4 | 104.4 | 104.0 | 623.4 | |
| | Islam Satpayev | 103.8 | 104.9 | 104.0 | 104.5 | 103.6 | 103.3 | 624.1 | |
| | Nikita Shakhtorin | 102.1 | 103.2 | 106.0 | 104.4 | 105.0 | 103.2 | 623.9 | |
| 8 | Vietnam (VIE) | 309.9 | 313.5 | 310.7 | 310.6 | 311.4 | 314.8 | 1870.9 | |
| | Nguyen Minh Quang | 102.1 | 106.0 | 103.9 | 104.1 | 104.5 | 103.2 | 623.8 | |
| | Nguyen Tam Quang | 103.3 | 101.7 | 102.1 | 104.0 | 103.2 | 105.8 | 620.1 | |
| | Phung Viet Dung | 104.5 | 105.8 | 104.7 | 102.5 | 103.7 | 105.8 | 627.0 | |
| 9 | Mongolia (MGL) | 310.8 | 312.6 | 312.3 | 312.8 | 311.1 | 310.5 | 1870.1 | |
| | Erkhembayar Batbayar | 103.6 | 104.7 | 103.2 | 104.6 | 104.9 | 104.5 | 625.5 | |
| | Sainkhuu Enkhtuvshin | 101.5 | 102.8 | 104.5 | 103.8 | 102.0 | 100.5 | 615.1 | |
| | Bayaraa Nyantai | 105.7 | 105.1 | 104.6 | 104.4 | 104.2 | 105.5 | 629.5 | |
| 10 | Bangladesh (BAN) | 307.0 | 311.5 | 311.7 | 312.6 | 312.0 | 312.7 | 1867.5 | |
| | Md Robiul Islam | 101.0 | 104.5 | 103.8 | 104.8 | 104.8 | 103.4 | 622.3 | |
| | Md Rabbi Hasan Munna | 103.7 | 102.2 | 102.7 | 103.6 | 104.2 | 104.9 | 621.3 | |
| | Arnab Sharar | 102.3 | 104.8 | 105.2 | 104.2 | 103.0 | 104.4 | 623.9 | |
| 11 | Thailand (THA) | 312.0 | 310.8 | 311.3 | 310.8 | 310.9 | 311.4 | 1867.2 | |
| | Chanon Binmad | 103.9 | 104.5 | 103.7 | 103.5 | 104.3 | 105.4 | 625.3 | |
| | Patsugree Sriwichai | 104.4 | 104.1 | 103.9 | 103.4 | 104.4 | 102.6 | 622.8 | |
| | Napis Tortungpanich | 103.7 | 102.2 | 103.7 | 103.9 | 102.2 | 103.4 | 619.1 | |
| 12 | Qatar (QAT) | 306.7 | 309.0 | 308.0 | 308.4 | 309.5 | 308.0 | 1849.6 | |
| | Abdulrahman Ahmad S B Al-Sulaiti | 101.1 | 103.1 | 102.6 | 104.9 | 102.4 | 101.9 | 616.0 | |
| | Abdullah Zain M Alsunaidi | 104.4 | 103.0 | 103.0 | 100.1 | 102.9 | 103.4 | 616.8 | |
| | Khalid Abdulrahman A H Sharshani | 101.2 | 102.9 | 102.4 | 103.4 | 104.2 | 102.7 | 616.8 | |
| 13 | Maldives (MDV) | 304.2 | 304.4 | 302.8 | 301.9 | 303.5 | 305.2 | 1822.0 | |
| | Maaidh Mohamed | 102.8 | 102.6 | 103.1 | 102.9 | 101.2 | 101.9 | 614.5 | |
| | Umar Mohamed | 102.1 | 101.7 | 101.9 | 100.5 | 102.8 | 101.2 | 610.2 | |
| | Ibrahim Shifan | 99.3 | 100.1 | 97.8 | 98.5 | 99.5 | 102.1 | 597.3 | |
