= Sailing at the 2022 Asian Games – Mixed 470 =

Mixed 470 at the 2022 Asian Games
- Venue: Xiangshan Sailing Centre
- Date: 21–26 September 2023
- Competitors: 14 from 7 nations

Medalists
gold medal	Keiju Okada; Miho Yoshioka	Japan
silver medal	Dong Wenju; Wang Jingsa	China
bronze medal	Kim Ji-a; Cho Sung-min	South Korea

The mixed 470 competition at the 2022 Asian Games was held from 21 to 26 September 2023.

== Schedule ==
All times are China Standard Time (UTC+08:00)

Date	Time	Event
Thursday, 21 September 2023	11:00	Race 1–2
Friday, 22 September 2023	14:00	Race 3–4
Saturday, 23 September 2023	11:00	Race 5–6
Sunday, 24 September 2023	11:00	Race 7–8
Monday, 25 September 2023	14:00	Race 9–10
Tuesday, 26 September 2023	11:00	Race 11–12

== Results ==
Legend

- DSQ — Disqualification
- UFD — U flag disqualification

Rank	Team	Race												Total
Rank	Team	1	2	3	4	5	6	7	8	9	10	11	12	Total
1st place, gold medalist(s)	Japan (JPN); Keiju Okada; Miho Yoshioka	1	1	1	2	1	1	1	2	~~(8)~~; UFD	1	1	2	14
2nd place, silver medalist(s)	China (CHN); Dong Wenju; Wang Jingsa	3	3	2	1	2	3	2	1	1	2	~~(4)~~	1	21
3rd place, bronze medalist(s)	South Korea (KOR); Kim Ji-a; Cho Sung-min	2	6	4	~~(7)~~	3	5	3	3	2	3	5	4	40
4	Thailand (THA); Navee Thamsoontorn; Piyaporn Khemkaew	5	5	3	4	5	2	~~(6)~~	5	5	4	3	5	46
5	Malaysia (MAS); Fauzi Kaman Shah; Juni Karimah Noor Jamali	~~(8)~~; DSQ	2	8 DSQ	3	6	6	5	4	4	6	2	3	49
6	India (IND); Preethi Kongara; Sudhanshu Shekhar	4	4	5	~~(6)~~	4	4	4	6	3	5	6	6	51
7	Pakistan (PAK); Nadine Xerxes Avari; Mehboob	6	~~(8)~~; UFD	6	5	7	7	7	7	6	7	7	7	72
