= Neha Thakur =

Indian sailor

Personal information
- Nationality: India
- Born: India

Sport
- Country: India
- Sport: Sailing
Medal record
Sailing
Representing India
Asian Games
Silver medal – second place	2023 Hangzhou	Girl's ILCA4

Neha Thakur is an Indian sailor.

== Early life and background ==
She was born in a village in the Dewas district of Madhya Pradesh. Her father is a farmer, and her mother is a housewife.

== Career ==
She was handpicked by the NSS in 2017 as part of their talent-hunt program.

In 2022, she won a bronze medal at the Asian Sailing Championships in Abu Dhabi.

Since the 2022 Asian Games were postponed to 2023, she qualified for the games, as the original contender Ritika Dangi had turned 18, which was past the age limit. She won the silver medal at the Girl's ILCA4 competition in the 2022 Asian Games.
