= Sailing at the 2022 Asian Games – Men's 49er =

Men's 49er at the 2022 Asian Games
- Venue: Ningbo Xiangshan Sailing Centre
- Date: 21–26 September 2023
- Competitors: 16 from 8 nations

Medalists
gold medal	Wen Zaiding; Liu Tian	China
silver medal	Musab Al-Hadi; Waleed Al-Kendi	Oman
bronze medal	Akira Sakai; Russell Aylsworth	Hong Kong

The men's 49er competition at the 2022 Asian Games was held from 21 to 26 September 2023 at Xiangshan Sailing Centre in Ningbo.

== Schedule ==
All times are China Standard Time (UTC+08:00)

Date	Time	Event
Thursday, 21 September 2023	11:00	Race 1–3
Friday, 22 September 2023	14:10	Race 4–6
Saturday, 23 September 2023	11:00	Race 7–8
Sunday, 24 September 2023	14:10	Race 9–10
Monday, 25 September 2023	11:00	Race 11–12
Tuesday, 26 September 2023	14:10	Race 13–14

== Results ==
Legend

- DSQ — Disqualification
- OCS — On course side
- UFD — U flag disqualification

Rank	Team	Race														Total
Rank	Team	1	2	3	4	5	6	7	8	9	10	11	12	13	14	Total
1st place, gold medalist(s)	China (CHN); Wen Zaiding; Liu Tian	2	1	~~(9)~~; OCS	1	1	9 DSQ	3	2	3	1	7	1	9 UFD	2	42
2nd place, silver medalist(s)	Oman (OMA); Musab Al-Hadi; Waleed Al-Kendi	5	~~(6)~~	2	6	2	5	4	1	2	3	5	5	3	3	46
3rd place, bronze medalist(s)	Hong Kong (HKG); Akira Sakai; Russell Aylsworth	3	4	1	5	6	1	2	4	6	6	4	~~(8)~~	4	1	47
4	South Korea (KOR); Kim Kyoung-duk; Bae Sang-woo	1	2	3	~~(7)~~	4	2	7	3	4	5	1	4	5	6	47
5	India (IND); K. C. Ganapathy; Varun Thakkar	~~(8)~~	3	4	3	3	3	1	6	1	2	8	7	2	5	48
6	Singapore (SGP); Koh Yi Nian; Tan Jen E	7	7	6	4	5	7	8	~~(9)~~; UFD	5	4	3	2	6	4	68
7	Japan (JPN); Shingen Furuya; Akira Takayanagi	4	~~(8)~~	5	2	7	6	6	5	7	8	6	6	1	7	70
8	Thailand (THA); Suthon Yampinid; Kan Kachachuen	6	5	7	~~(8)~~	8	4	5	7	8	7	2	3	7	8	77
