= Sailing at the 2022 Asian Games – Men's RS:X =

Men's RS:X at the 2022 Asian Games
- Venue: Xiangshan Sailing Centre
- Date: 21–26 September 2023
- Competitors: 6 from 6 nations

Medalists
gold medal	Cho Won-woo	South Korea
silver medal	Natthaphong Phonoppharat	Thailand
bronze medal	Eabad Ali	India

The men's RS:X competition at the 2022 Asian Games was held from 21 to 26 September 2023 at Xiangshan Sailing Centre in Ningbo.

== Schedule ==
All times are China Standard Time (UTC+08:00)

Date	Time	Event
Thursday, 21 September 2023	14:00	Race 1–3
Friday, 22 September 2023	11:10	Race 4–6
Saturday, 23 September 2023	14:00	Race 7–8
Sunday, 24 September 2023	11:10	Race 9–10
Monday, 25 September 2023	11:00	Race 11–12
Tuesday, 26 September 2023	14:10	Race 13–14

== Results ==
Legend

- DNF — Did not finish
- RET — Retired
- STP — Standard penalty
- UFD — U flag disqualification

Rank	Athlete	Race														Total
Rank	Athlete	1	2	3	4	5	6	7	8	9	10	11	12	13	14	Total
1st place, gold medalist(s)	Cho Won-woo (KOR)	1	1	1	1	1	1	1	1	1	~~(2)~~	1	1	1	1	13
2nd place, silver medalist(s)	Natthaphong Phonoppharat (THA)	5	2	2	2	2	3	2	2	2	1	2	2	2	~~(7)~~; RET	29
3rd place, bronze medalist(s)	Eabad Ali (IND)	3	~~(7)~~; DNF	7 DNF	3	3	2	4	4	6	4	7 DNF	3	4	2	52
4	Izzuddin Abdul Rani (MAS)	4	~~(7)~~; DNF	4	5	5	5	3	5	3	3	7 DNF	4	3	3	54
5	Au Ling Yeung (HKG)	2	~~(7)~~; DNF	3	4	4	4	5	3	5	5	7 DNF	7 DNF	6	5	60
6	Keo Phearun (CAM)	~~(8)~~; STP	7 DNF	7 DNF	6	6	6	7 UFD	7 DNF	4	6	7 DNF	7 DNF	5	4	79
