= Himanshu Dhillon =

Indian sport shooter (born 2005)

Personal information
- Born: 29 September 2005 (age 20) Jind, Haryana, India

Sport
- Sport: Shooting
- Event: 10 m air rifle
Medal record
Men's 10 m air rifle shooting
Representing India
Asian Games
Silver medal – second place	2026 Aichi–Nagoya	Individual
Silver medal – second place	2026 Aichi–Nagoya	Team

Himanshu Dhillon (born 29 September 2005) is an Indian sport shooter who specialises in the 10 m air rifle. He won silver medals in the individual and team 10 m air rifle events at the 2026 Asian Games.

== Early life ==
Dhillon is from Jind, Haryana, India. He started as a wrestler but after a few weeks he tried his hand at shooting and stuck to the sport following a coach's suggestion.

== Career ==
On 21 September 2026, Dhillon partnered with Rudrankksh Patil and Parth Mane to claim a silver medal for India in the 10m air rifle team event with a combined score of 1890.1 points. Later, he claimed his second silver in the individual scoring 252.4 points in the seven-sereies final. He qualified for the final in the seventh place with a score of 630.0 points. Teammate Rudrankksh qualified third with 631.8 points but could only get a bronze in the final.

Dhillon won two gold medals and a bronze at the ISSF Junior World Cup in 2025. In July 2026, he bagged a bronze, his first medal at the senior level, in the 10m air rifle mixed team event, partnering Sonam Maskar at the ISSF World Cup 2026 in Hangzhou. He scored 317.4 points and along with Sonam Uttam Maskar's 317.2, for a total of 634.6 points in the qualification round and went on to score 220.6 each for a total score of 441.2 points for a bronze.

In December 2025, he won a gold medal partnering Ramita Jindal, in the 10m air rifle mixed team event at the 68th National Shooting Championship at Bhopal.
