= Sailing at the 2022 Asian Games – Girls' ILCA 4 =

Girls' ILCA 4 at the 2022 Asian Games
- Venue: Xiangshan Sailing Centre
- Date: 21–26 September 2023
- Competitors: 8 from 8 nations

Medalists
gold medal	Noppasorn Khunboonjan	Thailand
silver medal	Neha Thakur	India
bronze medal	Keira Carlyle	Singapore

The girls' ILCA 4 competition at the 2022 Asian Games was held from 21 to 26 September 2023 at Xiangshan Sailing Centre in Ningbo. It was a youth event and sailors born in or after 2006 were eligible to participate.

== Schedule ==
All times are China Standard Time (UTC+08:00)

Date	Time	Event
Thursday, 21 September 2023	11:10	Race 1–2
Friday, 22 September 2023	14:00	Race 3–4
Saturday, 23 September 2023	11:10	Race 5–6
Sunday, 24 September 2023	14:00	Race 7–8
Monday, 25 September 2023	14:10	Race 9–10
Tuesday, 26 September 2023	11:00	Race 11

== Results ==
Legend

- DNC — Did not come to the starting area
- DPI — Discretionary penalty imposed
- RET — Retired

Rank	Athlete	Race											Total
Rank	Athlete	1	2	3	4	5	6	7	8	9	10	11	Total
1st place, gold medalist(s)	Noppasorn Khunboonjan (THA)	2	1	1	2	~~(4)~~	2	1	3	1	1	2	16
2nd place, silver medalist(s)	Neha Thakur (IND)	3	3	3	1	~~(5)~~	3	3	2	3	2	4	27
3rd place, bronze medalist(s)	Keira Carlyle (SGP)	1	4	~~(5)~~	4	2	1	2	4	5	4	1	28
4	Seol Jae-kyoung (KOR)	4	2	4	~~(6)~~	1	6	4	1	2	3	3	30
5	Huang Ziyan (HKG)	5	5	2	~~(7)~~	3	5	5	6	4	5	6	46
6	Taalya Tranchell (SRI)	6	7	6	3	6	7	~~(9)~~; RET	5	6	7	5	58
7	Zoya Asad Ali (PAK)	~~(9)~~; DNC	9 DPI	7	5	7	4	7	8	7	6	8	68
8	Camellia Al-Qubaisi (UAE)	7	~~(8)~~	8	8	8	8	6	7	8	8	7	75
