= Jesper Johansson =

Swedish ice hockey player (born 1993)

- Born: July 6, 1993 (age 33) Skellefteå, Sweden
- Height: 6 ft 1 in (185 cm)
- Weight: 174 lb (79 kg; 12 st 6 lb)
- Position: Forward
- Shoots: Right
- Elitserien team: Skellefteå AIK
- NHL draft: Undrafted
- Playing career: 2013–present

Jesper Johansson (born July 6, 1993) is a Swedish ice hockey player.

Johansson made his Elitserien debut playing with Skellefteå AIK during the 2012–13 Elitserien season.
