= Sheng Lihao =

Chinese sport shooter (born 2004)

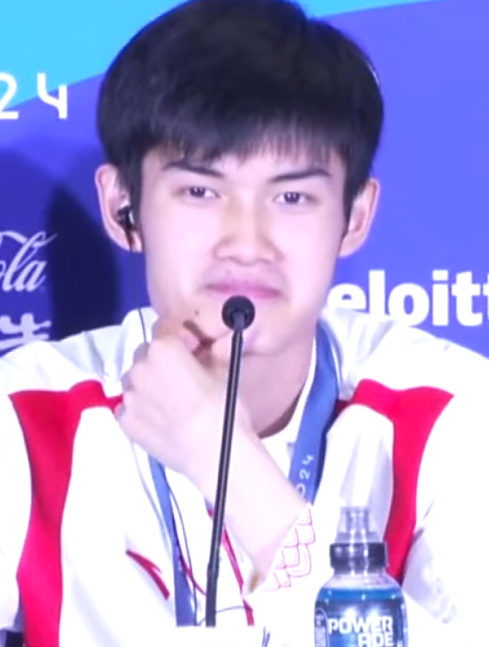
- Sheng in 2024

Personal information
- Native name: 盛李豪
- Nationality: Chinese
- Born: 4 December 2004 (age 21) Zhangjiagang, Jiangsu, China

Sport
- Country: China
- Sport: Shooting
- Events: 10 metre air rifle 50 metre rifle 3 positions
- Club: Jiangsu Province
- Coached by: Yao Ye (club, national), CHN; Du Li (national)
Medal record
Men's shooting
Representing China
Olympic Games
Gold medal – first place	2024 Paris	10m air rifle
Gold medal – first place	2024 Paris	10m air rifle mixed team
Silver medal – second place	2020 Tokyo	10m air rifle
World Championships
Gold medal – first place	2023 Baku	10m air rifle mixed team
Gold medal – first place	2025 Cairo	10m air rifle team
Gold medal – first place	2025 Cairo	10m air rifle mixed team
Gold medal – first place	2026 Doha	10m air rifle
Gold medal – first place	2026 Doha	10m air rifle team
Gold medal – first place	2026 Doha	10m Air Rifle Mixed
Silver medal – second place	2022 Cairo	10m air rifle team
Bronze medal – third place	2022 Cairo	10m air rifle
Bronze medal – third place	2022 Cairo	10m air rifle mixed team
Bronze medal – third place	2025 Cairo	10m air rifle
World Cup
Gold medal – first place	2025 Lima	10 m air Rifle
Silver medal – second place	2025 Munich	Mixed team
Silver medal – second place	2025 Ningbo	10 m air Rifle
Silver medal – second place	2025 Ningbo	Mixed team
Bronze medal – third place	2025 Munich	10 m air Rifle
Asian Games
Gold medal – first place	2022 Hangzhou	10m air rifle mixed team
Gold medal – first place	2022 Hangzhou	10m air rifle
Bronze medal – third place	2022 Hangzhou	10m air rifle team
Gold medal – first place	2026 Aichi–Nagoya	10m air rifle team
Gold medal – first place	2026 Aichi–Nagoya	10m air rifle
Gold medal – first place	2026 Aichi–Nagoya	10m air rifle mixed team
Gold medal – first place	2026 Aichi–Nagoya	50 m rifle 3 positions team
Asian Championships
Gold medal – first place	2023 Changwon	10m air rifle
Silver medal – second place	2023 Changwon	10m air rifle team
Bronze medal – third place	2019 Doha	50m rifle 3 positions junior

Sheng Lihao (Chinese: 盛李豪; pinyin: Shèng Lǐháo; born 4 December 2004) is a Chinese sport shooter. He won the silver medal at the 2020 Summer Olympics in the 10m air rifle event. He won the gold medal in both the Men's 10 metre Air Rifle and the 10m Air Rifle Mixed Team in a duo with Huang Yuting at the Summer Olympics 2024 in Paris.

Sheng's journey into shooting began at the age of 13, during a holiday when his father introduced him to the sport. His enthusiasm was immediate, and he soon expressed a desire to pursue shooting seriously. Recognising it as a valuable extracurricular activity, his parents supported his ambition. Sheng joined the Suzhou Sports School’s Shooting team and was later promoted to the Jiangsu provincial team.

At 14, Sheng's skills earned him a place on the China national team. By 15, he was selected for the Tokyo Olympic team, where he won silver and was celebrated as the youngest athlete to win an Olympic medal in the shooting event. Sheng set a new world record with a score of 637.9 points.
