= Denise Lim =

Singaporean sailor (born 1991)

Denise Lim (born September 14, 1991) is a Singaporean sailor. She and Justin Liu placed 19th in the Nacra 17 event at the 2016 Summer Olympics.
