= Park Ha-jun =

South Korean sport shooter (born 2000)

Personal information
- Nationality: South Korean
- Born: 19 April 2000 (age 26) Yangyang, South Korea

Sport
- Country: South Korea
- Sport: Shooting
- Event: 10 metre air rifle
Medal record
Men's shooting
Representing South Korea
Olympic Games
Silver medal – second place	2024 Paris	mixed 10 metre air rifle
World Championships
Bronze medal – third place	2022 Cairo	10 m air rifle mixed team
Bronze medal – third place	2026 Doha	10m Air Rifle Mixed
Asian Games
Silver medal – second place	2026 Aichi–Nagoya	10m air rifle mixed team
Bronze medal – third place	2022 Hangzhou	mixed 10 metre air rifle
Bronze medal – third place	2026 Aichi–Nagoya	10m air rifle team
Asian Championships
Gold medal – first place	2024 Jakarta	10 m air rifle team
Bronze medal – third place	2023 Changwon	10 m air rifle mixed team
Bronze medal – third place	2024 Jakarta	10m air rifle mixed team
Bronze medal – third place	2025 Shymkent	10 m air rifle team
Bronze medal – third place	2025 Shymkent	10 m air rifle
Bronze medal – third place	2025 Shymkent	air rifle Mixed team
Asian Airgun Championships
Gold medal – first place	2022 Daegu	10 m air rifle
Bronze medal – third place	2022 Daegu	10 m air rifle team
Bronze medal – third place	2022 Daegu	10 m air rifle mixed team
World Cup
Gold medal – first place	2022 Baku	10 m air rifle mixed team
Gold medal – first place	2022 Baku	10 m air rifle team
Silver medal – second place	2022 Changwon	10 m air rifle team
Bronze medal – third place	2024 Baku	10 m air rifle
Bronze medal – third place	2025 Ningbo	10 m air rifle

Park Ha-jun (Korean: 박하준; born 19 April 2000) is a South Korean sport shooter. He won the silver medal at the 2024 Summer Olympics in the mixed 10 metre air rifle event.
