= Justin Liu =

Singaporean sailor (born 1991)

Justin Liu (born May 28, 1991) is a Singaporean sailor. He and Denise Lim placed 19th in the Nacra 17 event at the 2016 Summer Olympics.
