= Oman at the 2022 Asian Games =

Oman at the multi-sports event

- IOC code: OMA
- NOC: Oman Olympic Committee

in Hangzhou 19 September 2023 – 8 October 2023
- Competitors: 44 in 7 sports
- Medals: Gold 0 Silver 1 Bronze 1 Total 2

Asian Games appearances (overview)
- 1982; 1986; 1990; 1994; 1998; 2002; 2006; 2010; 2014; 2018; 2022; 2026

Oman competed at the 2022 Asian Games in Hangzhou, Zhejiang, China, which was held from 23 September 2023 to 8 October 2023. Oman won their first silver medal at the Asian Games.

== Medalists ==
The following Oman competitors won medals at the Games.

Medal	Name	Sport	Event	Date
Silver	Musab Al-Hadi; Waleed Al-Kendi	Sailing	Men's 49er	26 Sep
Bronze	Husain Mohsin Al-Farsi	Athletics	Men's 800 metres	3 Oct
