= Singapore at the 2022 Asian Games =

- IOC code: SGP
- NOC: Singapore National Olympic Council
- Website: www.singaporeolympics.com (in English)

in Hangzhou September 23 – October 8
- Competitors: 431 in 32 sports
- Flag bearers: Amita Berthier, Jowen Lim
- Medals Ranked 20th: Gold 3 Silver 6 Bronze 7 Total 16

Asian Games appearances (overview)
- 1951; 1954; 1958; 1962; 1966; 1970; 1974; 1978; 1982; 1986; 1990; 1994; 1998; 2002; 2006; 2010; 2014; 2018; 2022; 2026

Singapore competed in the 2022 Asian Games in Hangzhou, China from 23 September to 8 October 2023. The Games was postponed in 2022 due to COVID-19 pandemic. The event marked Singapore's 19th appearance at the Asian Games, having competed at every Games since 1951.

== Background ==
On 25 February 2023, during the Singapore Leg of the Hangzhou Asian Games Fun Run event organised by the Olympic Council of Asia (OCA) and the Singapore National Olympic Council (SNOC), Dr Koh Koon Teck was announced as the chef-de-mission of the Hangzhou Games. He will be assisted by Olympians Tao Li and Koh Seng Leong, who were appointed as his deputies.

=== Broadcasters ===
Name	Type	Ref
Mediacorp	Free-to-air and over-the-top	

== Competitors ==
Singapore will be sending a total of 431 athletes, competing across 32 sports. This will be the highest delegation ever that Singapore have sent to the Games. Fencer Amita Berthier and Wushu exponent Jowen Lim have been chosen as the flag bearers.

Sport	Male	Female	Total
Artistic Swimming	0	10	10
Diving	2	2	4
Swimming	11	11	22
Marathon swimming	2	1	3
Water Polo	13	13	26
Archery	3	2	5
Athletics	12	9	21
Badminton	9	4	13
Baseball	24	0	24
Boxing	0	1	1
Bridge	9	9	18
Canoe (Sprint)	6	2	8
Chess	0	1	1
Cricket	15	0	15
Cycling	2	0	2
Dragon Boat	14	14	28
Equestrian	0	4	4
Esports	1	0	1
Fencing	4	12	16
Football	0	22	22
Go (Weiqi)	5	0	0
Golf	4	3	7
Gymnastics (Artistic)	1	4	5
Gymnastics (Rhythmic)	0	4	4
Hockey (Field)	18	18	36
Ju-jitsu	4	5	9
Modern Pentathlon	1	0	1
Roller Skating	5	0	5
Rowing	1	2	3
Rugby Sevens	12	12	24
Sailing	7	6	13
Sepak Takraw	6	0	6
Shooting	4	8	12
Softball	0	17	17
Sport Climbing	5	0	5
Squash	4	0	4
Table Tennis	5	5	10
Taekwondo	1	2	3
Triathlon	2	2	4
Wrestling	2	1	3
Wushu	3	4	7
Xiangqi	2	2	4
Total	219	212	431

== Games summary ==
=== Medalist ===
Medal	Athlete	Sport	Event	Date
Gold	Shanti Pereira	Athletics	Women's 200M	2 October
Gold	Maximilian Maeder	Sailing	Men's Kite	27 September
Gold	Ryan Lo	Sailing	Men's ILCA7	27 September
Silver	Stephenie Chen	Canoeing	Women's K-1 500m	3 October
Silver	Shanti Pereira	Athletics	Women's 100M	30 September
Silver	Teong Tzen Wei	Swimming	Men's 50m Butterfly	28 September
Silver	Jowen Lim	Wushu	Men's Daoshu + Gunshu	27 September
Silver	Justin Liu; Denise Lim	Sailing	Nacra 17	26 September
Silver	Isaac Goh	Sailing	Boy's ILCA4	26 September
Bronze	Kimberly Lim; Cecilia Low	Sailing	49erFX	26 September
Bronze	Victoria Chan	Sailing	Women's ILCA6	27 September
Bronze	Keira Marie Carlyle	Sailing	Girl's ILCA4	26 September
Bronze	Kimberly Ong	Wushu	Women's Changquan	25 September
Bronze	Leong Jia Min; Li Lan; Lim Jing Xuan; Low Siok Hui; Jazlene Ong; Selene Tan	Bridge	Women's team	4 October
Bronze	Loo Choon Chou; Luo Cheng; Gideon Tan; Lam Ze Ying; Seet Choon Cheng; Tan Sock Ngin	Bridge	Mixed team	4 October
Bronze	Ngô Lan Hương	Xiangqi	Women's individual	7 October

== Sport climbing ==
Speed

Athlete	Event	Qualification		Round of 16	Quarter-finals	Semi-finals	Final / BM	
Athlete	Event	Best	Rank	Opposition Time	Opposition Time	Opposition Time	Opposition Time	Rank
Tan Bing Qian	Men's	6.767	18	Did not advance				

Speed relay

Athlete	Event	Qualification		Quarter-finals	Semi-finals	Final / BM	
Athlete	Event	Time	Rank	Opposition Time	Opposition Time	Opposition Time	Rank
Denzel Chua; Mohamad Kamal; Tan Bing Qian	Men's	20.293	6 Q	Iran (IRI); W FS	China (CHN); L 20.632–16.152	South Korea (KOR); L 23.169–17.827	4

Combined

Athlete	Event	Qualification				Semi-finals				Final			
Athlete	Event	Boulder Point	Lead Point	Total	Rank	Boulder Point	Lead Point	Total	Rank	Boulder Point	Lead Point	Total	Rank
Dennis Chua	Men's	69.9	30	99.9	10 Q	14.9	12	26.9	18	Did not advance			
Luke Goh	Men's	69.5	45.1	114.6	9 Q	24.6	26.1	50.7	13	Did not advance			

== Swimming ==
Men

Athlete	Event	Heats		Final	
Athlete	Event	Time	Rank	Time	Rank
Quah Zheng Wen	100 m freestyle		Q	49.27	8
Maximillian Ang	200 m individual medley	2:02.44	7 Q	2:03.32	8
Zachary Tan	200 m individual medley	2:03.08	8 Q	2:02.94	7
Jonathan Tan	100 m freestyle		Q	48.94	6

Women

Athlete	Event	Heats		Final	
Athlete	Event	Time	Rank	Time	Rank
Gan Ching Hwee	1500 m freestyle	—N/a		16:24.67	4
Letitia Sim	50 m breaststroke		Q	31.15	7
Letitia Sim	100 m breaststroke				
Quah Jing Wen	200 m butterfly		Q	2:10.13	5
Quah Jing Wen; Quah Ting Wen; Amanda Lim; Marina Chan	4 × 100 m freestyle relay		Q	3:44.16	4
