= Chess at the 2022 Asian Games – Men's individual rapid =

Men's individual rapid at the 2022 Asian Games
- Venue: Hangzhou Chess Academy
- Date: 24–27 September 2023
- Competitors: 34 from 19 nations

Medalists
gold medal	Wei Yi	China
silver medal	Nodirbek Abdusattorov	Uzbekistan
bronze medal	Javokhir Sindarov	Uzbekistan

The men's individual rapid competition at the 2022 Asian Games in Hangzhou was held from 24 September to 27 September 2023 at Hangzhou Chess Academy (Zhili).

== Schedule ==
All times are China Standard Time (UTC+08:00)

Date	Time	Event
Sunday, 24 September 2023	15:00	Round 1
Sunday, 24 September 2023	17:00	Round 2
Monday, 25 September 2023	15:00	Round 3
Monday, 25 September 2023	17:00	Round 4
Tuesday, 26 September 2023	15:00	Round 5
Tuesday, 26 September 2023	17:00	Round 6
Tuesday, 26 September 2023	19:00	Round 7
Wednesday, 27 September 2023	15:00	Round 8
Wednesday, 27 September 2023	17:00	Round 9

== Results ==
=== Round 1 ===
White	Score	Black
Raymond Song (TPE)	½–½	Wei Yi (CHN)
Nodirbek Abdusattorov (UZB)	1–0	Husein Aziz Nezad (QAT)
Mohammad Fahad Rahman (BAN)	0–1	Vidit Gujrathi (IND)
Arjun Erigaisi (IND)	1–0	Paulo Bersamina (PHI)
Azarya Jodi Setyaki (INA)	½–½	Parham Maghsoudloo (IRI)
Bu Xiangzhi (CHN)	½–½	Prin Laohawirapap (THA)
Shinya Kojima (JPN)	0–1	Javokhir Sindarov (UZB)
Amin Tabatabaei (IRI)	1–0	Sugaryn Gan-Erdene (MGL)
Adelard Bai (TPE)	½–½	Nguyễn Ngọc Trường Sơn (VIE)
Rinat Jumabayev (KAZ)	1–0	Mikhail Markov (KGZ)
Thanadon Kulpruethanon (THA)	0–1	Lê Tuấn Minh (VIE)
Enamul Hossain (BAN)	½–½	Kwon Se-hyun (KOR)
Kohei Yamada (JPN)	1–0	Sumiyaagiin Bilgüün (MGL)
Kazybek Nogerbek (KAZ)	1–0	Ahn Hong-jin (KOR)
Bader Al-Hajiri (KUW)	0–1	Novendra Priasmoro (INA)
Susal de Silva (SRI)	1–0	Kwong Wing Ki (HKG)
Jamison Kao (HKG)	½–½	Semetey Tologontegin (KGZ)

=== Round 2 ===
White	Score	Black
Rinat Jumabayev (KAZ)	0–1	Nodirbek Abdusattorov (UZB)
Vidit Gujrathi (IND)	0–1	Kazybek Nogerbek (KAZ)
Lê Tuấn Minh (VIE)	½–½	Arjun Erigaisi (IND)
Javokhir Sindarov (UZB)	½–½	Susal de Silva (SRI)
Novendra Priasmoro (INA)	0–1	Amin Tabatabaei (IRI)
Wei Yi (CHN)	1–0	Kohei Yamada (JPN)
Parham Maghsoudloo (IRI)	1–0	Raymond Song (TPE)
Kwon Se-hyun (KOR)	0–1	Bu Xiangzhi (CHN)
Nguyễn Ngọc Trường Sơn (VIE)	1–0	Azarya Jodi Setyaki (INA)
Prin Laohawirapap (THA)	1–0	Enamul Hossain (BAN)
Semetey Tologontegin (KGZ)	1–0	Adelard Bai (TPE)
Sumiyaagiin Bilgüün (MGL)	1–0	Jamison Kao (HKG)
Husein Aziz Nezad (QAT)	0–1	Mikhail Markov (KGZ)
Ahn Hong-jin (KOR)	0–1	Mohammad Fahad Rahman (BAN)
Paulo Bersamina (PHI)	1–0	Thanadon Kulpruethanon (THA)
Kwong Wing Ki (HKG)	0–1	Shinya Kojima (JPN)
Sugaryn Gan-Erdene (MGL)	1–0	Bader Al-Hajiri (KUW)

=== Round 3 ===
White	Score	Black
Nodirbek Abdusattorov (UZB)	1–0	Amin Tabatabaei (IRI)
Kazybek Nogerbek (KAZ)	½–½	Parham Maghsoudloo (IRI)
Susal de Silva (SRI)	0–1	Wei Yi (CHN)
Arjun Erigaisi (IND)	1–0	Nguyễn Ngọc Trường Sơn (VIE)
Bu Xiangzhi (CHN)	½–½	Lê Tuấn Minh (VIE)
Semetey Tologontegin (KGZ)	0–1	Javokhir Sindarov (UZB)
Vidit Gujrathi (IND)	1–0	Prin Laohawirapap (THA)
Shinya Kojima (JPN)	0–1	Rinat Jumabayev (KAZ)
Mikhail Markov (KGZ)	0–1	Sumiyaagiin Bilgüün (MGL)
Kohei Yamada (JPN)	1–0	Novendra Priasmoro (INA)
Mohammad Fahad Rahman (BAN)	0–1	Paulo Bersamina (PHI)
Enamul Hossain (BAN)	1–0	Sugaryn Gan-Erdene (MGL)
Raymond Song (TPE)	1–0	Kwon Se-hyun (KOR)
Azarya Jodi Setyaki (INA)	0–1	Jamison Kao (HKG)
Adelard Bai (TPE)	½–½	Husein Aziz Nezad (QAT)
Thanadon Kulpruethanon (THA)	1–0	Kwong Wing Ki (HKG)
Bader Al-Hajiri (KUW)	0–1	Ahn Hong-jin (KOR)

=== Round 4 ===
White	Score	Black
Javokhir Sindarov (UZB)	½–½	Nodirbek Abdusattorov (UZB)
Wei Yi (CHN)	1–0	Kazybek Nogerbek (KAZ)
Amin Tabatabaei (IRI)	½–½	Arjun Erigaisi (IND)
Lê Tuấn Minh (VIE)	0–1	Vidit Gujrathi (IND)
Parham Maghsoudloo (IRI)	1–0	Kohei Yamada (JPN)
Sumiyaagiin Bilgüün (MGL)	½–½	Bu Xiangzhi (CHN)
Paulo Bersamina (PHI)	1–0	Rinat Jumabayev (KAZ)
Nguyễn Ngọc Trường Sơn (VIE)	1–0	Semetey Tologontegin (KGZ)
Jamison Kao (HKG)	0–1	Enamul Hossain (BAN)
Prin Laohawirapap (THA)	0–1	Susal de Silva (SRI)
Novendra Priasmoro (INA)	½–½	Raymond Song (TPE)
Mikhail Markov (KGZ)	0–1	Mohammad Fahad Rahman (BAN)
Ahn Hong-jin (KOR)	1–0	Shinya Kojima (JPN)
Sugaryn Gan-Erdene (MGL)	1–0	Adelard Bai (TPE)
Kwon Se-hyun (KOR)	1–0	Thanadon Kulpruethanon (THA)
Husein Aziz Nezad (QAT)	1–0	Azarya Jodi Setyaki (INA)
Kwong Wing Ki (HKG)	0–1	Bader Al-Hajiri (KUW)

=== Round 5 ===
White	Score	Black
Nodirbek Abdusattorov (UZB)	1–0	Wei Yi (CHN)
Vidit Gujrathi (IND)	1–0	Parham Maghsoudloo (IRI)
Arjun Erigaisi (IND)	½–½	Javokhir Sindarov (UZB)
Bu Xiangzhi (CHN)	1–0	Paulo Bersamina (PHI)
Kazybek Nogerbek (KAZ)	½–½	Amin Tabatabaei (IRI)
Susal de Silva (SRI)	0–1	Nguyễn Ngọc Trường Sơn (VIE)
Enamul Hossain (BAN)	0–1	Sumiyaagiin Bilgüün (MGL)
Rinat Jumabayev (KAZ)	½–½	Sugaryn Gan-Erdene (MGL)
Mohammad Fahad Rahman (BAN)	0–1	Lê Tuấn Minh (VIE)
Raymond Song (TPE)	1–0	Ahn Hong-jin (KOR)
Kohei Yamada (JPN)	½–½	Prin Laohawirapap (THA)
Husein Aziz Nezad (QAT)	0–1	Novendra Priasmoro (INA)
Semetey Tologontegin (KGZ)	1–0	Kwon Se-hyun (KOR)
Shinya Kojima (JPN)	1–0	Jamison Kao (HKG)
Adelard Bai (TPE)	1–0	Thanadon Kulpruethanon (THA)
Bader Al-Hajiri (KUW)	0–1	Mikhail Markov (KGZ)
Azarya Jodi Setyaki (INA)	1–0	Kwong Wing Ki (HKG)

=== Round 6 ===
White	Score	Black
Nodirbek Abdusattorov (UZB)	0–1	Vidit Gujrathi (IND)
Wei Yi (CHN)	1–0	Javokhir Sindarov (UZB)
Sumiyaagiin Bilgüün (MGL)	1–0	Arjun Erigaisi (IND)
Nguyễn Ngọc Trường Sơn (VIE)	½–½	Bu Xiangzhi (CHN)
Parham Maghsoudloo (IRI)	½–½	Paulo Bersamina (PHI)
Amin Tabatabaei (IRI)	1–0	Raymond Song (TPE)
Lê Tuấn Minh (VIE)	1–0	Kazybek Nogerbek (KAZ)
Novendra Priasmoro (INA)	1–0	Rinat Jumabayev (KAZ)
Kohei Yamada (JPN)	0–1	Enamul Hossain (BAN)
Sugaryn Gan-Erdene (MGL)	0–1	Susal de Silva (SRI)
Mikhail Markov (KGZ)	1–0	Semetey Tologontegin (KGZ)
Prin Laohawirapap (THA)	0–1	Mohammad Fahad Rahman (BAN)
Ahn Hong-jin (KOR)	0–1	Adelard Bai (TPE)
Azarya Jodi Setyaki (INA)	½–½	Shinya Kojima (JPN)
Jamison Kao (HKG)	0–1	Husein Aziz Nezad (QAT)
Kwon Se-hyun (KOR)	1–0	Kwong Wing Ki (HKG)
Thanadon Kulpruethanon (THA)	½–½	Bader Al-Hajiri (KUW)

=== Round 7 ===
White	Score	Black
Vidit Gujrathi (IND)	0–1	Wei Yi (CHN)
Sumiyaagiin Bilgüün (MGL)	½–½	Nodirbek Abdusattorov (UZB)
Bu Xiangzhi (CHN)	½–½	Amin Tabatabaei (IRI)
Lê Tuấn Minh (VIE)	1–0	Nguyễn Ngọc Trường Sơn (VIE)
Arjun Erigaisi (IND)	1–0	Novendra Priasmoro (INA)
Javokhir Sindarov (UZB)	1–0	Parham Maghsoudloo (IRI)
Paulo Bersamina (PHI)	½–½	Enamul Hossain (BAN)
Susal de Silva (SRI)	½–½	Kazybek Nogerbek (KAZ)
Raymond Song (TPE)	½–½	Mikhail Markov (KGZ)
Mohammad Fahad Rahman (BAN)	1–0	Adelard Bai (TPE)
Rinat Jumabayev (KAZ)	1–0	Kwon Se-hyun (KOR)
Semetey Tologontegin (KGZ)	0–1	Sugaryn Gan-Erdene (MGL)
Shinya Kojima (JPN)	0–1	Kohei Yamada (JPN)
Husein Aziz Nezad (QAT)	½–½	Ahn Hong-jin (KOR)
Thanadon Kulpruethanon (THA)	1–0	Azarya Jodi Setyaki (INA)
Bader Al-Hajiri (KUW)	0–1	Prin Laohawirapap (THA)
Kwong Wing Ki (HKG)	0–1	Jamison Kao (HKG)

=== Round 8 ===
White	Score	Black
Wei Yi (CHN)	1–0	Lê Tuấn Minh (VIE)
Vidit Gujrathi (IND)	½–½	Sumiyaagiin Bilgüün (MGL)
Nodirbek Abdusattorov (UZB)	1–0	Arjun Erigaisi (IND)
Javokhir Sindarov (UZB)	1–0	Bu Xiangzhi (CHN)
Amin Tabatabaei (IRI)	½–½	Nguyễn Ngọc Trường Sơn (VIE)
Enamul Hossain (BAN)	½–½	Mohammad Fahad Rahman (BAN)
Paulo Bersamina (PHI)	1–0	Susal de Silva (SRI)
Kazybek Nogerbek (KAZ)	½–½	Rinat Jumabayev (KAZ)
Sugaryn Gan-Erdene (MGL)	0–1	Raymond Song (TPE)
Mikhail Markov (KGZ)	½–½	Kohei Yamada (JPN)
Adelard Bai (TPE)	0–1	Novendra Priasmoro (INA)
Prin Laohawirapap (THA)	½–½	Husein Aziz Nezad (QAT)
Ahn Hong-jin (KOR)	0–1	Semetey Tologontegin (KGZ)
Kwon Se-hyun (KOR)	1–0	Shinya Kojima (JPN)
Jamison Kao (HKG)	0–1	Thanadon Kulpruethanon (THA)
Azarya Jodi Setyaki (INA)	1–0	Bader Al-Hajiri (KUW)
Kwong Wing Ki (HKG)	1–0	Bye

=== Round 9 ===
White	Score	Black
Sumiyaagiin Bilgüün (MGL)	0–1	Wei Yi (CHN)
Lê Tuấn Minh (VIE)	0–1	Nodirbek Abdusattorov (UZB)
Javokhir Sindarov (UZB)	1–0	Vidit Gujrathi (IND)
Amin Tabatabaei (IRI)	1–0	Paulo Bersamina (PHI)
Arjun Erigaisi (IND)	1–0	Enamul Hossain (BAN)
Novendra Priasmoro (INA)	½–½	Bu Xiangzhi (CHN)
Nguyễn Ngọc Trường Sơn (VIE)	½–½	Raymond Song (TPE)
Rinat Jumabayev (KAZ)	1–0	Mohammad Fahad Rahman (BAN)
Kohei Yamada (JPN)	0–1	Kazybek Nogerbek (KAZ)
Susal de Silva (SRI)	1–0	Mikhail Markov (KGZ)
Semetey Tologontegin (KGZ)	0–1	Prin Laohawirapap (THA)
Husein Aziz Nezad (QAT)	1–0	Kwon Se-hyun (KOR)
Thanadon Kulpruethanon (THA)	0–1	Sugaryn Gan-Erdene (MGL)
Adelard Bai (TPE)	0–1	Azarya Jodi Setyaki (INA)
Bader Al-Hajiri (KUW)	0–1	Jamison Kao (HKG)
Kwong Wing Ki (HKG)	0–1	Ahn Hong-jin (KOR)
Shinya Kojima (JPN)	1–0	Bye

=== Summary ===
Rank	Athlete	Rtg	Round									Total	ARO
Rank	Athlete	Rtg	1	2	3	4	5	6	7	8	9	Total	ARO
1st place, gold medalist(s)	Wei Yi (CHN)	2735	½	1	1	1	0	1	1	1	1	7½	2523
2nd place, silver medalist(s)	Nodirbek Abdusattorov (UZB)	2731	1	1	1	½	1	0	½	1	1	7	2595
3rd place, bronze medalist(s)	Javokhir Sindarov (UZB)	2607	1	½	1	½	½	0	1	1	1	6½	2613
4	Amin Tabatabaei (IRI)	2577	1	1	0	½	½	1	½	½	1	6	2519
5	Vidit Gujrathi (IND)	2694	1	0	1	1	1	1	0	½	0	5½	2559
6	Arjun Erigaisi (IND)	2675	1	½	1	½	½	0	1	0	1	5½	2541
7	Sumiyaagiin Bilgüün (MGL)	2460	0	1	1	½	1	1	½	½	0	5½	2541
8	Lê Tuấn Minh (VIE)	2497	1	½	½	0	1	1	1	0	0	5	2601
9	Paulo Bersamina (PHI)	2351	0	1	1	1	0	½	½	1	0	5	2534
10	Kazybek Nogerbek (KAZ)	2417	1	1	½	0	½	0	½	½	1	5	2530
11	Nguyễn Ngọc Trường Sơn (VIE)	2575	½	1	0	1	1	½	0	½	½	5	2484
12	Bu Xiangzhi (CHN)	2611	½	1	½	½	1	½	½	0	½	5	2476
13	Raymond Song (TPE)	2383	½	0	1	½	1	0	½	1	½	5	2465
14	Novendra Priasmoro (INA)	2412	1	0	0	½	1	1	0	1	½	5	2450
15	Susal de Silva (SRI)	2398	1	½	0	1	0	1	½	0	1	5	2447
16	Rinat Jumabayev (KAZ)	2517	1	0	1	0	½	0	1	½	1	5	2395
17	Prin Laohawirapap (THA)	2325	½	1	0	0	½	0	1	½	1	4½	2434
18	Mohammad Fahad Rahman (BAN)	2366	0	1	0	1	0	1	1	½	0	4½	2426
19	Sugaryn Gan-Erdene (MGL)	2309	0	1	0	1	½	0	1	0	1	4½	2406
20	Enamul Hossain (BAN)	2466	½	0	1	1	0	1	½	½	0	4½	2354
21	Husein Aziz Nezad (QAT)	2380	0	0	½	1	0	1	½	½	1	4½	2334
22	Kohei Yamada (JPN)	2157	1	0	1	0	½	0	1	½	0	4	2474
23	Mikhail Markov (KGZ)	2256	0	1	0	0	1	1	½	½	0	4	2382
24	Azarya Jodi Setyaki (INA)	2334	½	0	0	0	1	½	0	1	1	4	2289
25	Parham Maghsoudloo (IRI)	2662	½	1	½	1	0	½	0			3½	2464
26	Kwon Se-hyun (KOR)	2192	½	0	0	1	0	1	0	1	0	3½	2410
27	Semetey Tologontegin (KGZ)	2396	½	1	0	0	1	0	0	1	0	3½	2336
28	Ahn Hong-jin (KOR)	2125	0	0	1	1	0	0	½	0	1	3½	2323
29	Jamison Kao (HKG)	1651	½	0	1	0	0	0	1	0	1	3½	2323
30	Thanadon Kulpruethanon (THA)	2209	0	0	1	0	0	½	1	1	0	3½	2232
31	Shinya Kojima (JPN)	2318	0	1	0	0	1	½	0	0	1	3½	2179
32	Adelard Bai (TPE)	2299	½	0	½	0	1	1	0	0	0	3	2373
33	Bader Al-Hajiri (KUW)	2021	0	0	0	1	0	½	0	0	0	1½	2228
34	Kwong Wing Ki (HKG)	1850	0	0	0	0	0	0	0	1	0	1	2156
