= Chinese Taipei at the 2022 Asian Games =

- Chinese Taipei Olympic flag
- IOC code: TPE
- NOC: Chinese Taipei Olympic Committee
- Website: http://www.tpenoc.net/

in Hangzhou, Zhejiang, China
- Competitors: 526 in 42 sports
- Flag bearers: Wang Kuan-Hung (Swimming), Lo Chia-Ling (Taekwondo)
- Medals Ranked 6th: Gold 19 Silver 20 Bronze 28 Total 67

Asian Games appearances (overview)
- 1954; 1958; 1962; 1966; 1970; 1974–1986; 1990; 1994; 1998; 2002; 2006; 2010; 2014; 2018; 2022; 2026

Chinese Taipei, representing the Republic of China (Taiwan), competed at the 2022 Asian Games in Hangzhou, People's Republic of China, from 23 September 2023 to 8 October 2023.

== Medal summary ==
=== Medals by sport ===
Medals by sport
Sport	Gold	Silver	Bronze	Total
Roller sports	7	2	4	13
Tennis	2	2	1	5
Canoeing	2	0	1	3
Judo	2	0	0	2
Boxing	1	2	2	5
Bridge	1	1	0	2
Karate	1	1	0	2
Gymnastics Artistic	1	0	2	3
3X3 Basketball	1	0	0	1
Go	1	0	0	1
Soft tennis	0	3	2	5
Taekwondo	0	3	2	5
Esports	0	2	2	4
Archery	0	1	1	2
Kabaddi	0	1	1	2
Swimming	0	1	0	1
Baseball	0	1	0	1
Table tennis	0	0	2	2
Athletics	0	0	1	1
Badminton	0	0	1	1
Golf	0	0	1	1
Kurash	0	0	1	1
Shooting	0	0	1	1
Softball	0	0	1	1
Weightlifting	0	0	1	1
Wushu	0	0	1	1
Total	19	20	28	67

== Competitors ==
Sport		Men	Women	Total
Aquatics	Marathon swimming	1	1	2
Aquatics	Swimming	4	4	8
Archery		8	8	16
Athletics		25	12	37
Badminton		10	10	20
Baseball	Baseball	24	—	24
Baseball	Softball	—	17	17
Basketball	Basketball	12	12	24
Basketball	3×3 Basketball	4	4	8
Boxing		4	4	8
Breakdancing		2	2	4
Canoeing	Slalom	2	2	4
Canoeing	Sprint	1	—	1
Cycling	Mountain bike	—	1	1
Cycling	Road	2	6 one is repeated	4
Cycling	Track	5	6 one is repeated	10
Dragon boat		14	–	14
Equestrian		5	3	8
Fencing		4	–	4
Football		22	22	44
Golf		4	3	7
Gymnastics	Artistic gymnastics	5	5	10
Judo		3	6	9
Kabaddi		12	12	24
Martial arts	Ju-jitsu	1	—	1
Martial arts	Karate	4	4	8
Martial arts	Kurash	3	3	6
Mind sports	Bridge	9	9	18
Mind sports	Chess	2	–	2
Mind sports	Esports	19	–	19
Mind sports	Go	6	4	10
Mind sports	Xiangqi	3	2	5
Roller sports	Roller skating	8	10	18
Roller sports	Skateboarding	1	1	2
Rowing		—	3	3
Rugby sevens		12	—	12
Sailing		—	1	1
Shooting		8	10	18
Sport climbing		1	1	2
Table tennis		5	5	10
Taekwondo		6	6	12
Tennis	Soft tennis	5	5	10
Tennis	Tennis	6	6	12
Volleyball	Volleyball	12	12	24
Weightlifting		3	5	8
Wrestling		1	4	5
Wushu		6	4	10
Total		294	229	523

== Archery ==
=== Recurve ===
Men

Athlete	Event	Preliminaries		Round of 64	Round of 32	Round of 16	Quarterfinals	Semi-finals	Finals	Rank
Athlete	Event	Score	Rank	Round of 64	Round of 32	Round of 16	Quarterfinals	Semi-finals	Finals	Rank
Tang Chih-chun	Individual	687	2 Q	Bye	Jantsan (MGL); W 6–2	Baatrkhuyag (MGL); L 2–6	Did not advance			17
Su Yu-yang	Individual	673	10 Q	Bye	Lê (VIE); L 4–6	Did not advance				33
Wei Chun-heng	Individual	670	13	Did not advance						53
Tai Yu-hsüan	Individual	637	47	Did not advance						67
Tang Chih-chun; Su Yu-yang; Wei Chun-heng	Team	2030	2 Q	—N/a		Thailand (THA); L 4–5	Did not advance			9

Women

Athlete	Event	Preliminaries		Round of 64	Round of 32	Round of 16	Quarterfinals	Semi-finals	Finals	Rank
Athlete	Event	Score	Rank	Round of 64	Round of 32	Round of 16	Quarterfinals	Semi-finals	Finals	Rank
Chiu Yi-ching	Individual	651	13 Q	Bye	Kang (PRK); W 7–3	Lei (TPE); W 6–4	Lim (KOR); L 2–6	Did not advance		5
Lei Chien-ying	Individual	653	12 Q	Bye	Pyae Sone (MYA); W 6–2	Chiu (TPE); L 4–6	Did not advance			9
Peng Chia-mao	Individual	637	21	Did not advance						57
Kuo Tzu-ying	Individual	637	22	Did not advance						58
Lei Chien-ying; Chiu Yi-ching; Peng Chia-mao	Team	1941	3 Q	—N/a		Bangladesh (BAN); W 5–1	Vietnam (VIE); L 4–5	Did not advance		5

Mixed

Athlete	Event	Preliminaries		Round of 16	Quarterfinals	Semi-finals	Finals	Rank
Athlete	Event	Score	Rank	Round of 16	Quarterfinals	Semi-finals	Finals	Rank
Tang Chih-chun; Lei Chien-ying	Team	1340	3 Q	Philippines (PHI); W 6–0	Japan (JPN); L 4–5	Did not advance		5

=== Compound ===
Men

Athlete	Event	Preliminaries		Round of 64	Round of 32	Round of 16	Quarter-finals	Semi-finals	Finals	Rank
Athlete	Event	Score	Rank	Round of 64	Round of 32	Round of 16	Quarter-finals	Semi-finals	Finals	Rank
Chang Cheng-wei	Individual	711	2 Q	Bye	Ethempola (SRI); W 148–128	Pradana (INA); W 146–145	Yang (KOR); L 144–147	Did not advance		5
Chen Chieh-lun	Individual	697	17 Q	Bye	Cheung (HKG); W 147–143	Deotale (IND); L 145–146	Did not advance			9
Yang Cheng-jui	Individual	694	19	Did not advance						42
Pan Yu-ping	Individual	689	30	Did not advance						47
Chang Cheng-wei; Chen Chieh-lun; Yang Cheng-jui	Team	2102	3 Q	—N/a		Mongolia (MGL); W 232–212	Kazakhstan (KAZ); W 231–229	India (IND); L 224–235	Malaysia (MAS); L 208–228	4

Women

Athlete	Event	Preliminaries		Round of 64	Round of 32	Round of 16	Quarter-finals	Semi-finals	Finals	Rank
Athlete	Event	Score	Rank	Round of 64	Round of 32	Round of 16	Quarter-finals	Semi-finals	Finals	Rank
Chen Yi-hsuan	Individual	695	5 Q	Bye	Almayyas (KUW); W 143–135	Cojuangco (PHI); L 144^{9}–144^{10}	Did not advance			9
Huang I-jou	Individual	690	8 Q	Bye	Wong (HKG); W 145–139	Bybordy (IRI); L 144^{9}–144^{10}	Did not advance			9
Wang Lu-yun	Individual	688	11	Did not advance						35
Chen Li-ju	Individual	686	13	Did not advance						37
Chen Yi-hsuan; Huang I-jou; Wang Lu-yun	Team	2073	3 Q	—N/a		Bye	Thailand (THA); W 227–226	South Korea (KOR); W 224–230	India (IND); L 229–230	2nd place, silver medalist(s)

Mixed

Athlete	Event	Preliminaries		Round of 16	Quarter-finals	Semi-finals	Finals	Rank
Athlete	Event	Score	Rank	Round of 16	Quarter-finals	Semi-finals	Finals	Rank
Chang Cheng-wei; Chen Yi-hsuan	Team	1406	3 Q	Iraq (IRQ); W 158–152	Indonesia (INA); W 156–154	South Korea (KOR); L 153–158	Kazakhstan (KAZ); W 157–154	3rd place, bronze medalist(s)

== Athletics ==
=== Track event ===
Men

Athlete	Event	Heat		Semi-finals		Final	
Athlete	Event	Time	Rank	Time	Rank	Time	Rank
Yang Chun-han	100 metres	10.31	12 Q	10.23	12	Did not advance	
Yang Chun-han	200 metres	20.98	5 Q	20.67	3 Q	20.74	3rd place, bronze medalist(s)
Chen Chieh	400 metres hurdles	50.85	13	Did not advance			
Chen Kuei-ru	110 metres hurdles	DNF	—	—N/a		Did not advance	
Hsu Chia-wei	20 kilometres walk	—N/a				1:31:19	7
Lin Yu-sian	100 metres	10.43	16 Q	10.35	16	Did not advance	
Peng Ming-yang	400 metres hurdles	49.88	6 q	—N/a		50.97	7
Wei Tai-sheng; Chen Wen-pu; Yang Chun-han; Lin Yu-tang	4 × 100 metres relay	39.81	8 q	—N/a		39.28	6 SB
Chen Jian-rong; Ke Wu Yen-ming; Lin Chung-wei; Yu Chen-yi	4 × 400 metres relay	DQ	—	—N/a		Did not advance	

Women

Athlete	Event	Heat		Final	
Athlete	Event	Time	Rank	Time	Rank
Zhang Bo-ya	100 metres hurdles	13.10	4 Q	13.31	4
Tsao Chun-yu	Marathon	—N/a		2:46.15	15

=== Field events ===
Men

Athlete	Event	Qualification		Final	
Athlete	Event	Result	Rank	Result	Rank
Cheng Chao-tsun	Javelin throw	—N/a		67.03	10
Fu Chao-hsuan	High jump	2.15	3 q	2.19	6
Hsiang Chun-hsien	High jump	DNS	—	Did not advance	
Huang Cheng-chi	Pole vault	—N/a		5.15	8
Huang Shih-feng	Javelin throw	—N/a		NM	—
Li Yun-chen	Triple jump	—N/a		16.17	6
Lin Chia-hsing	Long jump	7.66	7 q	7.67	9
Lin Yu-tang	Long jump	7.70	5 q	7.91	5
Ma Hau-wei	Shot put	—N/a		18.91	6

Women

Athlete	Event	Final	
Athlete	Event	Result	Rank
Chu Pin-hsun	Javelin throw	54.93	7
Jian Chen-xin	Shot put	16.61	4 PB
Lee Ching-ching	High jump	1.75	7
Li Hui-jun	Javelin throw	51.54	9
Lin Pei-hsuan	High jump	1.75	11
Lin Tzu-chi	Long jump	5.77	11
Shen Yi-ju	Pole vault	4.00	7
Wu Ci-en	Shot put	14.80	11
Yu Ya-chien	Hammer throw	63.21	4

=== Combined events ===
Men's decathlon

Athlete	Event	100 m	LJ	SP	HJ	400 m	110H	DT	PV	JT	1500 m	Total	Rank
Cho Chia-hsuan	Result	11.14	7.01	11.40	1.88	51.48	14.55	38.74	4.20	58.94	4:44.63	7250	5
Cho Chia-hsuan	Points	830	816	570	696	748	903	639	673	722	651	7250	5
Wang Chen-yu	Result	11.06	7.00	14.94	1.91	DNF							—
Wang Chen-yu	Points	847	814	786	723	DNF							—

Women's heptathlon

Athlete	Event	110H	HJ	SP	200 m	LJ	JT	800 m	Total	Rank
Chen Cai-juan	Result	14.28	1.70	12.70	25.80	5.78	40.35	2:30.91	5455	8
Chen Cai-juan	Points	939	855	707	815	783	674	682	5455	8

== Badminton ==
Men

Athlete	Event	Round of 64	Round of 32	Round of 16	Quarter-finals	Semi-finals	Final	
Athlete	Event	Opposition Score	Opposition Score	Opposition Score	Opposition Score	Opposition Score	Opposition Score	Rank
Chou Tien-chen	Singles	Pui (MAC); W 2–0	Christie (INA); W 2–0	Nettasinghe (SRI); W 2–0	Shi (CHN); L 0–2	Did not advance		5
Wang Tzu-wei	Singles	Bye	Ginting (INA); L 0–2	Did not advance				17
Lee Yang; Wang Chi-lin	Doubles	—N/a	Ong / Teo (MAS); W 2–0	Hoki / Kobayashi (JPN); W w/o	Alfian / Ardianto (INA); W 2–0	Choi / Kim (KOR); L 0–2	Did not advance	3rd place, bronze medalist(s)
Lu Ching-yao; Yang Po-han	Doubles	—N/a	Chia / Soh (MAS); L 1–2	Did not advance				17
Chi Yu-jen; Chou Tien-chen; Lee Yang; Lu Ching-yao; Su Ching-heng; Su Li-yang; Wang Chi-lin; Wang Tzu-wei; Yang Po-han; Ye Hong-wei	Team	—N/a		Maldives (MDV); W 3–0	China (CHN); L 1–3	Did not advance		5

Women

Athlete	Event	Round of 64	Round of 32	Round of 16	Quarter-finals	Semi-finals	Final	
Athlete	Event	Opposition Score	Opposition Score	Opposition Score	Opposition Score	Opposition Score	Opposition Score	Rank
Tai Tzu-ying	Singles	Bye	Munkhtsetseg (MGL); W 2–0	Ohori (JPN); L 0–2	Did not advance			9
Hsu Wen-chi	Singles	Bye	Sindhu (IND); L 0–2	Did not advance				17
Lee Chia-hsin; Teng Chun-hsun	Doubles	—N/a	Ng / Pui (MAC); W 2–0	Yeung / Yeung (HKG); L 1–2	Did not advance			9
Hsu Ya-ching; Lin Wan-ching	Doubles	—N/a	Lamsal / Tamang (NEP); W 2–0	Baek / Lee (KOR); L 0–2	Did not advance			9
Chang Ching-hui; Hsu Wen-chi; Hsu Ya-ching; Lee Chia-hsin; Lin Hsiang-ti; Lin Wan-ching; Sung Shuo-yun; Tai Tzu-ying; Teng Chun-hsun; Yang Ching-tun	Team	—N/a		Hong Kong (HKG); W 3–0	Japan (JPN); L 1–3	Did not advance		5

Mixed

Athlete	Event	Round of 32	Round of 16	Quarter-finals	Semi-finals	Final	
Athlete	Event	Opposition Score	Opposition Score	Opposition Score	Opposition Score	Opposition Score	Rank
Ye Hong-wei; Lee Chia-hsin	Doubles	Kusharjanto / Kusumawati (INA); W 2–0	Lee / Ng (HKG); W 2–1	Seo / Chae (KOR); L 0–2	Did not advance		5

== Baseball ==
Summary

Team	Event	Round 1	Round 2				Super round			Final	
Team	Event	Opposition Result	Opposition Result	Opposition Result	Opposition Result	Rank	Opposition Result	Opposition Result	Rank	Opposition Result	Rank
Chinese Taipei men's	Men's tournament	Bye	Thailand; W 12–1	South Korea; W 4–0	Hong Kong; W 15–0	1 SR	China; W 4–1	Japan; L 0–2	1 GM	South Korea; L 0–2	2nd place, silver medalist(s)

Team roster

Team rosters were announced on 1 October 2023.

Baseball at the 2022 Asian Games – Chinese Taipei roster
Players		Coaches
Pitchers: 18 Wu Sheng-feng (C); 70 Wang Cheng-hao; 57 Lai Po-wei; 47 Cheng Hao-chun; 11 Gu Lin Ruei-yang; 19 Wang Yan-Cheng; 45 Lin Yu-min; 97 Pan Wen-hui; 16 Liu Chih-jung; 44 Chen Po-yu	Catchers: 95 Tai Pei-fong; 10 Lyle Lin; Infielders: 1 Chen Min-sih; 5 Li I-wei; 6 Liao Chun-kai; 42 Lee Hao-yu; 39 Wu Nien-ting; 2 Lin Tzu-hao; 7 Tsung-Che Cheng; 83 Lin Li; Outfielders: 62 Yang Chen-yu; 29 Shen Hao-wei; 77 Lin An-ko; 4 Lin Tzu-wei	Manager: 96 Wu Shih-hsih; Coaches: 17 Lin Chia-yu; 27 Tang Den-kai; 66 Wu Fu-lien; 23 Shen Po-chang

Round 2

Pos	Team	Pld	W	L	RF	RA	PCT	GB	Qualification
1	Chinese Taipei	3	3	0	31	1	1.000	—	Super round
2	South Korea	3	2	1	27	4	.667	1	Super round
3	Hong Kong	3	1	2	8	25	.333	2	Placement round
4	Thailand	3	0	3	1	37	.000	3	Placement round

Source: OCA

1 October; 18:30	Thailand	1–12 (F/7)	Chinese Taipei	Baseball & Softball Sports Center, Shaoxing; Umpires: Kim Dae-nam (KOR)
1 October; 18:30	LP: Suppakorn Lin	Boxscore	WP: Wu Sheng-feng	Baseball & Softball Sports Center, Shaoxing; Umpires: Kim Dae-nam (KOR)
1 October; 18:30		Boxscore	HR: Lin Li (1)	Baseball & Softball Sports Center, Shaoxing; Umpires: Kim Dae-nam (KOR)

2 October; 18:30	South Korea	0–4	Chinese Taipei	Baseball & Softball Sports Center, Shaoxing; Umpires: Shunichi Fukuzawa (JPN)
2 October; 18:30	LP: Moon Dong-ju	Boxscore	WP: Lin Yu-min	Baseball & Softball Sports Center, Shaoxing; Umpires: Shunichi Fukuzawa (JPN)

3 October; 12:00	Chinese Taipei	15–0 (F/6)	Hong Kong	Baseball & Softball Sports Center, Shaoxing; Umpires: Masataka Mino (JPN)
3 October; 12:00	WP: Lai Po-wei	Boxscore	LP: Sam Leung	Baseball & Softball Sports Center, Shaoxing; Umpires: Masataka Mino (JPN)

Super round

Pos	Team	Pld	W	L	RF	RA	PCT	GB	Qualification
1	Chinese Taipei	3	2	1	8	3	.667 (Note: Head-to-head result: TPE 4–0 KOR.)	—	Gold medal match
2	South Korea	3	2	1	10	5	.667	—	Gold medal match
3	China	3	1	2	3	12	.333 (Note: Head-to-head result: CHN 1–0 JPN.)	1	Bronze medal match
4	Japan	3	1	2	2	3	.333	1	Bronze medal match

Source: OCA
Notes:

5 October; 18:30	Chinese Taipei	4–1	China	Baseball & Softball Sports Center, Shaoxing; Umpires: Shunichi Fukuzawa (JPN)
5 October; 18:30	WP: Chen Po-yu; Sv: Gu Lin Ruei-yang	Boxscore	LP: Gan Quan	Baseball & Softball Sports Center, Shaoxing; Umpires: Shunichi Fukuzawa (JPN)

6 October; 18:30	Japan	2–0	Chinese Taipei	Baseball & Softball Sports Center, Shaoxing; Umpires: Cho Ji-hyun (KOR)
6 October; 18:30	WP: Yoshiki Fuchigami	Boxscore	LP: Wang Yan-cheng	Baseball & Softball Sports Center, Shaoxing; Umpires: Cho Ji-hyun (KOR)

Gold medal match

7 October; 18:00	South Korea	2–0	Chinese Taipei	Baseball & Softball Sports Center, Shaoxing; Umpires: Masataka Mino (JPN)
7 October; 18:00	WP: Moon Dong-ju; Sv: Go Woo-suk	Boxscore	LP: Lin Yu-min	Baseball & Softball Sports Center, Shaoxing; Umpires: Masataka Mino (JPN)

== Basketball ==
=== 5x5 basketball ===
Summary

Team	Event	Pool play				Round of 16	Quarter-finals	Semi-finals	Finals / BM	
Team	Event	Opposition Result	Opposition Result	Opposition Result	CR	Opposition Result	Opposition Result	Opposition Result	Opposition Result	Rank
Chinese Taipei men	Men's tournament	Hong Kong; W 81–62	China; L 69–89	Mongolia; W 78–75	8 Q	Kazakhstan; W 83–62	Japan; W 85–66	Jordan; L 71–90	China; L 73–101	4
Chinese Taipei women	Women's tournament	North Korea; L 77–91	Thailand; W 58–54	South Korea; L 59–87	7 Q	—N/a	China; L 60–104	Did not advance		5

==== Men's tournament ====
Team roster

The players were announced on 25 September 2023.

Chinese Taipei men's national basketball team – 2022 Asian Games roster
Players
Coaches

Pos.	No.	Name	Age – Date of birth	Height	Club	Ctr.
G	0	Lin Ting-chien	23 – 31 October 1999	1.90 m (6 ft 3 in)	Tianjin Pioneers	(China)
F	1	Mohammad Al Bachir Gadiaga	25 – 27 April 1998	1.89 m (6 ft 2 in)	CTBC	(Taiwan)
F	5	Liu Cheng	32 – 24 November 1990	1.92 m (6 ft 4 in)	Shanghai Sharks	(China)
F	10	Hsieh Ya-hsun	24 – 30 October 1998	1.87 m (6 ft 2 in)	CTBC	(Taiwan)
G	14	Wu Yung-cheng	26 – 19 October 1996	1.85 m (6 ft 1 in)	Fubon Braves	(Taiwan)
F	20	Chou Po-hsun	32 – 6 March 1991	1.97 m (6 ft 6 in)	Taiwan Beer	(Taiwan)
C	21	Tseng Hsiang-chun	25 – 8 August 1998	2.05 m (6 ft 9 in)	Fubon Braves	(Taiwan)
C	26	Lee Te-wei	31 – 15 October 1991	2.02 m (6 ft 8 in)	Formosa Dreamers	(Taiwan)
C	31	William Joseph Artino	31 – 27 June 1992	2.11 m (6 ft 11 in)	Free agent
G	39	Lu Chun-hsiang	26 – 15 July 1997	1.90 m (6 ft 3 in)	Taoyuan Pauian Pilots	(Taiwan)
G	75	Lee Chi-wei	30 – 8 April 1993	1.92 m (6 ft 4 in)	TaiwanBeer Leopards	(Taiwan)
C	76	Tseng Wen-ting	39 – 6 July 1984	2.05 m (6 ft 9 in)	CTBC	(Taiwan)

Head coach

- (Taiwan) Sang Mao-sen

Assistant coach(es)

- (Taiwan) Chen Kuo-wei

Legend

- Club – describes last
  club before the tournament
- Age – describes age
  on 26 September 2023

Group stage

Pos	Team	Pld	W	L	PF	PA	PD	Pts	Qualification
1	China	3	3	0	273	169	+104	6	Quarterfinals
2	Chinese Taipei	3	2	1	228	226	+2	5	Qualification for quarterfinals
3	Hong Kong	3	1	2	181	240	−59	4	Qualification for quarterfinals
4	Mongolia	3	0	3	189	236	−47	3	

Source: OCA

26 September
20:00

Report

Hong Kong	62–81	Chinese Taipei
Scoring by quarter: 10–24, 17–20, 18–19, 17–18
Pts: Reid 16; Rebs: Reid 8 Asts: Leung S., Tsai 3		Pts: Liu 18; Rebs: Artino 10; Asts: Lin 7

Zijingang Campus Gymnasium, Hangzhou
Referees: Issam Al-Siyabi (OMA), Bandar Al-Suwaidi (QAT), Cheon Kam-jae (KOR)

28 September
20:00

Report

Chinese Taipei	69–89	China
Scoring by quarter: 12–23, 15–19, 26–28, 16–19
Pts: Artino 21; Rebs: Artino 11; Asts: Lin 7		Pts: Zhao J. 19; Rebs: Zhang 11; Asts: Zhao J. 7

Olympic Expo Center Gymnasium, Hangzhou
Referees: Wissam Zein (SYR), Issam Al-Siyabi (OMA), Anan Daraghma (PLE)

30 September
20:00

Report

Chinese Taipei	78–75	Mongolia
Scoring by quarter: 22–19, 21–25, 19–20, 16–11
Pts: Artino 27; Rebs: Liu, Artino 8 Asts: Tseng W. 6		Pts: Enkhbayasgalan 16; Rebs: Dölgöönmörön 9 Asts: Bolor-Erdene 11

Zijingang Campus Gymnasium, Hangzhou
Referees: Mohamed Al-Salam (BRN), Kim Bo-hui (KOR), Bandar Al-Suwaidi (QAT)

Round of 16

2 October
12:00

Report

Chinese Taipei	83–62	Kazakhstan
Scoring by quarter: 20–11, 24–15, 22–18, 17–18
Pts: Lin 19; Rebs: Artino 11; Asts: Lin 8		Pts: Pan 23; Rebs: Pan 7 Asts: Murzagaliyev 7

Olympic Expo Center Gymnasium, Hangzhou
Referees: Paul Skayem (LBN), Cheon Kam-jae (KOR), Bandar Al-Suwaidi (QAT)

Quarter-finals

3 October
20:00

Report

Japan	66–85	Chinese Taipei
Scoring by quarter: 12–28, 13–15, 18–23, 23–19
Pts: Imamura 15; Rebs: Imamura 5 Asts: Akaho, Kawashima 3		Pts: Lin 28; Rebs: Liu, Artino 10; Asts: Lin 8

Zijingang Campus Gymnasium, Hangzhou
Referees: Wissam Zein (SYR), Kim Bo-hui (KOR), Mohamed Al-Salam (BRN)

Semi-finals

4 October
16:00

Report

Jordan	90–71	Chinese Taipei
Scoring by quarter: 19–16, 26–19, 24–12, 21–24
Pts: Hollis-Jefferson 20; Rebs: Bohannon 15; Asts: Ibrahim 6		Pts: Lin 12; Rebs: Artino 11; Asts: Lin, Liu, Lee 4

Olympic Expo Center Gymnasium, Hangzhou
Referees: Harja Jaladri (INA), Preeda Muongmee (THA), Issam Al-Siyabi (OMA)

Bronze medal match

6 October
16:00

Report

Chinese Taipei	73–101	China
Scoring by quarter: 29–21, 20–25, 10–34, 14–21
Pts: Lin 20; Rebs: Artino 13; Asts: Gadiaga 5		Pts: Cui 20; Rebs: Hu J. 6 Asts: Zhao J. 8

Olympic Expo Center Gymnasium, Hangzhou
Referees: Alexey Stepanenko (KAZ), Issam Al-Siyabi (OMA), Cheon Kam-jae (KOR)

==== Women's tournament ====
Team roster

The players were announced on 25 September 2023.

Chinese Taipei men's national basketball team – 2022 Asian Games roster
Players
Coaches

Pos.	No.	Name	Age – Date of birth	Height	Club	Ctr.
G	2	Pan Tzu-yin	31 – 23 July 1992	1.70 m (5 ft 7 in)	Chunghwa Telecom	(Taiwan)
G	3	Lo Pin	27 – 2 September 1996	1.68 m (5 ft 6 in)	Cathy Life	(Taiwan)
F	4	Chen Yen-yu	28 – 7 October 1994	1.70 m (5 ft 7 in)	Sichuan Blue Whales	(China)
F	6	Chen Wei-an	27 – 1 November 1995	1.77 m (5 ft 10 in)	Cathy Life	(Taiwan)
F	11	Cheng I-hsiu	30 – 24 June 1993	1.78 m (5 ft 10 in)	Cathy Life	(Taiwan)
G	12	Lin Yu-ting	29 – 25 January 1994	1.78 m (5 ft 10 in)	Cathy Life	(Taiwan)
F	13	Cho Ching	25 – 13 October 1997	1.73 m (5 ft 8 in)	Taiyuen	(Taiwan)
F	17	Huang Ling-chuan	28 – 6 December 1994	1.75 m (5 ft 9 in)	Cathy Life	(Taiwan)
F	19	Hsu Yu-lien	26 – 18 April 1997	1.76 m (5 ft 9 in)	Cathy Life	(Taiwan)
C	22	Lin Tieh	24 – 2 August 1999	1.80 m (5 ft 11 in)	Taiyuen	(Taiwan)
G	24	Liu Hsi-yeh	31 – 10 October 1991	1.73 m (5 ft 8 in)	Taiwan Power	(Taiwan)
G	55	Peng Hsiao-tong	25 – 19 February 1998	1.68 m (5 ft 6 in)	Taiyuen

Head coach

- (Taiwan) Cheng Hui-yun

Assistant coach(es)

- (Taiwan) Lin Chi-wen
- (Taiwan) Yang Shu-ching

Legend

- Club – describes last
  club before the tournament
- Age – describes age
  on 26 September 2023

Group stage

Pos	Team	Pld	W	L	PF	PA	PD	Pts	Qualification
1	South Korea	3	3	0	258	177	+81	6	Quarterfinals
2	North Korea	3	2	1	258	207	+51	5	Quarterfinals
3	Chinese Taipei	3	1	2	194	232	−38	4	Quarterfinals
4	Thailand	3	0	3	159	253	−94	3	

Source: OCA

27 September
13:30

Report

Chinese Taipei	77–91	North Korea
Scoring by quarter: 17–14, 16–22, 25–33, 19–22
Pts: Lo, Chen W. 12; Rebs: Chen W. 8 Asts: Cheng 6		Pts: Pak J. 51; Rebs: Pak J. 14; Asts: Ro 11

Olympic Center Gymnasium, Shaoxing
Referees: Yana Nikogossyan (KAZ), Ahmad Al-Yousef (JOR), Anan Daraghma (PLE)

29 September
17:30

Report

Thailand	54–58	Chinese Taipei
Scoring by quarter: 16–19, 16–13, 11–6, 11–20
Pts: Udomsuk 14; Rebs: Lumdabpang 20; Asts: Lumdabpang, Wongtapha, Udomsuk 4		Pts: Lo 11; Rebs: Lin T. 8 Asts: Lin Y. 6

Olympic Center Gymnasium, Shaoxing
Referees: Harja Jaladri (INA), Yana Nikogossyan (KAZ), Anan Daraghma (PLE)

1 October
13:30

Report

South Korea	87–59	Chinese Taipei
Scoring by quarter: 21–18, 24–19, 18–11, 24–11
Pts: Kim 18; Rebs: Park J.H. 11; Asts: An 9		Pts: Lin Y. 16; Rebs: Lin T. 9 Asts: Cheng 5

Olympic Expo Center Gymnasium, Hangzhou
Referees: Yana Nikogossyan (KAZ), Mohamed Al-Salam (BRN), Ahmad Al-Yousef (JOR)

Quarter-finals

2 October
16:00

Report

China	104–60	Chinese Taipei
Scoring by quarter: 22–24, 25–7, 31–17, 26–12
Pts: Li Yue. 29; Rebs: Li Yue. 12; Asts: Li Yua. 7		Pts: Huang 13; Rebs: Cheng 6 Asts: Lin Y. 3

Olympic Expo Center Gymnasium, Hangzhou
Referees: Preeda Muongmee (THA), Kim Bo-hui (KOR), Anan Daraghma (PLE)

=== 3x3 basketball ===
Summary

Team	Event	Pool play					Round of 16	Quarter-finals	Semi-finals	Finals / BM	
Team	Event	Opposition Result	Opposition Result	Opposition Result	Opposition Result	Rank	Opposition Result	Opposition Result	Opposition Result	Opposition Result	Rank
Chinese Taipei men	Men's tournament	Hong Kong; W 22–12	Philippines; L 12–17	Mongolia; W 18–16	Jordan; W 21–7	2 Q	Thailand; W 19–17	China; W 22–15	South Korea; W 18–17	Qatar; W 18–16	1st place, gold medalist(s)
Chinese Taipei women	Women's tournament	Kazakhstan; W 22–14	Japan; W 15–12	Nepal; W 22–2	—N/a	1 Q	Bye	India; W 21–10	Mongolia; L 20–21	Japan; L 13–21	4

==== Men's tournament ====
Team roster

The players were announced on 24 September 2023.

- Chiang Chun
- Lin Sin-kuan
- Wang Jhe-yu
- Yu Xiang-ping

Group play

Pos	Team	Pld	W	L	PF	PA	PD	Qualification
1	Mongolia	4	3 (Note: Tied on head-to-head wins (1). Teams were ranked by their points scored.)	1	75	62	+13	Quarterfinals
2	Chinese Taipei	4	3	1	73	52	+21	Qualification for quarterfinals
3	Philippines	4	3	1	63	56	+7	Qualification for quarterfinals
4	Hong Kong	4	1	3	67	73	−6	
5	Jordan	4	0	4	37	72	−35	

Source: FIBA
Notes:

25 September
16:20

Chinese Taipei	22–12	Hong Kong
Pts: Wang 8		Pts: Lam 8

Deqing Geographic Information Park, Huzhou
Referees: Kim (KOR), Nagoshi (JPN)

26 September
17:00

Philippines	17–12	Chinese Taipei
Pts: Sajonia 6		Pts: Chiang 4

Deqing Geographic Information Park, Huzhou
Referees: Liu (MAS), Kim (KOR)

27 September
13:00

Chinese Taipei	18–16	Mongolia
Pts: Chiang 6		Pts: Ölzii-Orshikh 9

Deqing Geographic Information Park, Huzhou
Referees: Liu (MAS), Ibragimow (TKM)

28 September
18:15

Jordan	7–21	Chinese Taipei
Pts: Dajani, Al-Shiyyab, Hazaymeh 2		Pts: Yu, Chiang 6

Deqing Geographic Information Park, Huzhou
Referees: Rulyov (KAZ), Ibragimow (TKM)

Round of 16

30 September
15:05

Chinese Taipei	19–17	Thailand
Pts: Yu 7		Pts: Ejesu 9

Deqing Geographic Information Park, Huzhou
Referees: Rulyov (KAZ), Kim (KOR)

Quarter-finals

30 September
20:05

China	15–22	Chinese Taipei
Pts: Liu 8		Pts: Lin 14

Deqing Geographic Information Park, Huzhou
Referees: Liu (MAS), Nagoshi (JPN)

Semi-finals

1 October
17:15

Chinese Taipei	18–17 (OT)	South Korea
Pts: Lin 7		Pts: Seo 12

Deqing Geographic Information Park, Huzhou
Referees: Liu (MAS), Nagoshi (JPN)

Gold medal match

1 October
20:30

Qatar	16–18	Chinese Taipei
Pts: Saad 6		Pts: Lin 7

Deqing Geographic Information Park, Huzhou
Referees: Liu (MAS), Rulyov (KAZ)

==== Women's tournament ====
Team roster

The players were announced on 24 September 2023.

- Chen Yu-chieh
- Hsu Shih-han
- Huang Chiao-chun
- Kuo Hung-ting

Group play

Pos	Team	Pld	W	L	PF	PA	PD	Qualification
1	Chinese Taipei	3	3	0	59	28	+31	Quarterfinals
2	Japan	3	2	1	53	26	+27	Qualification for quarterfinals
3	Kazakhstan	3	1	2	38	51	−13	Qualification for quarterfinals
4	Nepal	3	0	3	16	61	−45	

Source: FIBA

25 September
19:00

Chinese Taipei	22–14	Kazakhstan
Pts: Chen 12		Pts: Kapitonova 8

Deqing Geographic Information Park, Huzhou
Referees: Nagoshi (JPN), Kim (KOR)

27 September
13:50

Japan	12–15	Chinese Taipei
Pts: Kubota 5		Pts: Chen 6

Deqing Geographic Information Park, Huzhou
Referees: Liu (MAS), Ibragimow (TKM)

29 September
14:15

Chinese Taipei	22–2	Nepal
Pts: Kuo 8		Pts: Khadka, Gurung 1

Deqing Geographic Information Park, Huzhou
Referees: Soliman (QAT), Banashankara (IND)

Quarter-finals

30 September
20:30

Chinese Taipei	21–10	India
Pts: Chen 8		Pts: Yadav 7

Deqing Geographic Information Park, Huzhou
Referees: Rulyov (KAZ), Burmaa (MGL)

Semi-finals

1 October
16:25

Mongolia	21–20	Chinese Taipei
Pts: Ariuntsetseg 9		Pts: Chen 9

Deqing Geographic Information Park, Huzhou
Referees: Kim (KOR), Soliman (QAT)

Bronze medal match

1 October
19:00

Japan	21–13	Chinese Taipei
Pts: Kubota 12		Pts: Kuo 6

Deqing Geographic Information Park, Huzhou
Referees: Ibragimow (TKM), Burmaa (MGL)

== Boxing ==
Key

- RSC – Win by referee stops contest.
- RSC-I – Win by referee stops contest - Injury.
- w/o – Walkover.

Men

Athlete	Event	Round of 32	Round of 16	Quarter-finals	Semi-finals	Final	
Athlete	Event	Opposition Result	Opposition Result	Opposition Result	Opposition Result	Opposition Result	Rank
Tu Po-wei	51 kg	Khalefah (KUW); W RSC	Panmot (THA); L 1–4	Did not advance			9
Lee Cheng-wei	57 kg	Khalokov (UZB); L 0–5	Did not advance				17
Lai Chu-en	63.5 kg	Oupathana (LAO); W RSC	Thapa (NEP); W 4–0	Wang (CHN); W 3–2	Al-Sarray (IRQ); W 5–0	Baatarsükhiin (MGL); L 0–5	2nd place, silver medalist(s)
Kan Chia-wei	71 kg	Rustambek (KGZ); W 4–1	Wijewarda (SRI); W 5–0	Aswan (MAS); W 5–0	Nurmuhammedov (TKM); W 4–1	Okazawa (JPN); L w/o	2nd place, silver medalist(s)

Women

Athlete	Event	Round of 32	Round of 16	Quarter-finals	Semi-finals	Final	
Athlete	Event	Opposition Result	Opposition Result	Opposition Result	Opposition Result	Opposition Result	Rank
Huang Hsiao-wen	54 kg	—N/a	Munguntsetseg (MGL); W 5–0	Chang (CHN); L 0–5	Did not advance		5
Lin Yu-ting	57 kg	—N/a	Petecio (PHI); W 4–1	Buapa (THA); W 5–0	Hooda (IND); W 5–0	Ibragimova (KAZ); W 5–0	1st place, gold medalist(s)
Wu Shih-yi	60 kg	Bye	Volossenko (KAZ); W 4–1	Kodirova (UZB); W 3–2	Yang WL (CHN); L 0–5	Did not advance	3rd place, bronze medalist(s)
Chen Nien-chin	66 kg	—N/a	Thapa (NEP); W RSC	Zulkaynarova (TJK); W RSC-I	Yang L (CHN); L 2–3	Did not advance	3rd place, bronze medalist(s)

== Breakdancing ==
Athlete	Event	Pre-Selection		Round Robin				Knock Outs	Semifinals	Finals / BM	
Athlete	Event	Points	Rank	Opposition Result	Opposition Result	Opposition Result	Rank	Opposition Result	Opposition Result	Opposition Result	Rank
Sun Chen	B-Boys	740.80	2 Q	Kim (KOR); L 0–2	Sherov (UZB); W 2–0	Rodsaart (THA); W 2–0	2 Q	Nakarai (JPN); L 1–2	Did not advance		5
Liu Cheng-te	B-Boys	607.40	14 Q	Sze (HKG); W 2–0	Nakarai (JPN); L 0–2	Hishikawa (JPN); L 0–2	3	Did not advance			10
Yang Jia-li	B-Girls	698.70	6 Q	Liu (CHN); L 0–2	Wong (HKG); W 2–0	Nguyen (VIE); W 2–0	2 Q	Yuasa (JPN); L 0–2	Did not advance		7
Chen Yi-ru	B-Girls	622.70	10 Q	Chan (HKG); W 2–0	Yuasa (JPN); L 0–2	Jeon (KOR); W 2–0	3	Did not advance			9

== Bridge ==
Athlete	Event	Qualification		Semi-finals	Final	Rank
Athlete	Event	Points	Rank	Opposition Result	Opposition Result	Rank
Chang Wei-ming; Chen Li-jen; Chou Che-min; Wang Kung-chieh; Wu Ming-hsuan; Yeh Cheng-hung	Men	231.13	6	Did not advance		6
Chen Yin-shou; Hsiao Kuan-chu; Lin Yin-yu; Liu Lin-chin; Liu Pei-hua; Yang Ming-ching	Women	156.41	3 Q	Hong Kong (HKG); W 194.00–163.10	China (CHN); L 212.10–213.00	2nd place, silver medalist(s)
Fan Kang-wei; Liu Ming-chien; Wu Tzu-lin; Chen Kuan-hsuan; So Ho-yee; Tsai Po-ya	Mixed	296.24	1 Q	Thailand (THA); W 248.10–168.00	China (CHN); W 196.00–185.77	1st place, gold medalist(s)

== Canoeing ==
=== Slalom ===
Men

Athlete	Event	Heat 1		Heat 2		Semi-finals		Final	
Athlete	Event	Time	Rank	Time	Rank	Time	Rank	Time	Rank
Wu Jung-cheng	C-1	104.24	8 H2	102.52	2 Q	418.66	11 Q	124.60	6
Wu Shao-hsuan	K-1	142.13	12 H2	96.25	1 Q	98.66	2 Q	97.12	3rd place, bronze medalist(s)

Women

Athlete	Event	Heat 1		Heat 2		Semi-finals		Final	
Athlete	Event	Time	Rank	Time	Rank	Time	Rank	Time	Rank
Chen Wei-han	C-1	116.64	4 H2	211.13	3 Q	171.59	5 Q	176.54	5
Chang Chu-han	K-1	108.83	3 SF	Bye		110.93	2 Q	109.51	1st place, gold medalist(s)

=== Sprint ===
Men

Athlete	Event	Heat		Semi-finals		Final	
Athlete	Event	Time	Rank	Time	Rank	Time	Rank
Lai Kuan-chieh	C-1 1000 metres	4:02.431	1	Bye		4:15.942	1st place, gold medalist(s)

== Chess ==
Athlete	Event	Rating	Round									Point	Rank
Athlete	Event	Rating	1	2	3	4	5	6	7	8	9	Point	Rank
Raymond Song	Men's individual	2383	Wei (CHN) ½–½	Maghsoodloo (IRI); L 0–1	Kwon (KOR); W 1–0	Priasmoro (INA) ½–½	Ahn (KOR); W 1–0	Tabatabaei (IRI); L 0–1	Markov (KGZ) ½–½	Sugaryn (MGL); W 1–0	Nguyễn (VIE) ½–½	5.0	13
Adelard Bai	Men's individual	2299	Nguyễn (VIE) ½–½	Tologon (KGZ); L 0–1	Bye ½–½	Sugaryn (MGL); L 0–1	Kulpruethanon (THA); W 1–0	Ahn (KOR); W 1–0	Rahman (BAN); L 0–1	Priasmoro (INA); L 0–1	Setyaki (INA); L 0–1	3.0	32

== Football ==
Summary

Team	Event	Group Stage					Round of 16	Quarterfinal	Semifinal	Final / BM	
Team	Event	Opposition Score	Opposition Score	Opposition Score	Opposition Score	Rank	Opposition Score	Opposition Score	Opposition Score	Opposition Score	Rank
Chinese Taipei men's	Men's tournament	North Korea; L 2–0	Indonesia; W 1–0	Kyrgyzstan; L 4–1	—N/a	4	Did not advance				18
Chinese Taipei women's	Women's tournament	Thailand; W 1–0	India; W 2–1	—N/a		1	Uzbekistan; L 1–2	Did not advance			6

=== Men's tournament ===
Roster

The following 21 players list is the Chinese Taipei squad for the 2022 Asian Games.

Head Coach: (Chinese Taipei) Chen Jiunn-ming

No.	Pos.	Player	Date of birth (age)	Club
1	GK	Chiu Yu-hung*	31 August 1994 (aged 29)	(Chinese Taipei Football Association) Taipower
2	DF	Huang Tzu-ming	18 November 2000 (aged 22)	(Chinese Taipei Football Association) Taipower
3	DF	Tu Shao-chieh	2 January 1999 (aged 24)	(Chinese Taipei Football Association) Taipower
5	DF	Wang Yi-you	29 November 1999 (aged 23)	(German Football Association) SGS Essen
6	DF	Liang Meng-hsin	3 April 2003 (aged 20)	(Chinese Taipei Football Association) Taichung Futuro
7	MF	Lin Ming-wei	20 May 2001 (aged 22)	(Chinese Taipei Football Association) Taiwan Steel
8	MF	Wu Yen-shu	21 October 1999 (aged 23)	(Chinese Football Association) Liaoning Shenyang Urban
9	FW	Lin Wei-chieh	9 October 1999 (aged 23)	(Chinese Taipei Football Association) Taiwan Steel
10	MF	Tsai Cheng-ju	2 January 1999 (aged 24)	(Chinese Taipei Football Association) Taipei Dragons
11	MF	Yu Yao-hsing	12 February 2002 (aged 21)	(Chinese Taipei Football Association) Ming Chuan University
12	MF	Wen Chih-hao*	25 March 1993 (aged 30)	(Chinese Taipei Football Association) Taipower
13	FW	Chen Po-yu	29 February 2000 (aged 23)	(Chinese Taipei Football Association) Taiwan Steel
14	FW	Wang Sheng-han	9 March 1999 (aged 24)	(Chinese Taipei Football Association) Taipower
15	DF	Ma Liang-cheng	16 April 1999 (aged 24)	(Chinese Taipei Football Association) Ming Chuan University
16	DF	Chin Wen-yen	30 May 2000 (aged 23)	(Chinese Taipei Football Association) Taipei Dragons
17	FW	Chen Po-liang*	11 August 1988 (aged 35)	(Chinese Football Association) Qingdao West Coast
18	GK	Li Guan-pei	7 May 2000 (aged 23)	(Chinese Taipei Football Association) Taiwan Steel
19	DF	Fang Li-peng	13 July 1999 (aged 24)	(Chinese Taipei Football Association) Hang Yuen
20	DF	Lin Chun-kai	11 August 1988 (aged 35)	(Chinese Taipei Football Association) Taipei Dragons
21	MF	Lan Hao-yu	13 January 1999 (aged 24)	(Chinese Taipei Football Association) Leopard Cat
22	GK	Lai Po-lun	25 June 1999 (aged 24)	(Chinese Taipei Football Association) Hang Yuen

* Over-aged player.

Group F

Pos	Team	Pld	W	D	L	GF	GA	GD	Pts	Qualification
1	North Korea	3	3	0	0	4	0	+4	9	Knockout stage
2	Kyrgyzstan	3	1	0	2	4	4	0	3 (Note: Head-to-head goal differences: Kyrgyzstan 4–3, Indonesia 2–1, Chinese Taipei 2–4)	Knockout stage
3	Indonesia	3	1	0	2	2	2	0	3	Knockout stage
4	Chinese Taipei	3	1	0	2	2	6	−4	3	

Source: Football – Men – Groups
Rules for classification: Group stage tierbreakers
Notes:
19 September 2023
16:00

North Korea	2–0	Chinese Taipei
Ri Jo-guk 7'; Kim Kuk-jin 12'	Report

Zhejiang Normal University East Stadium, Jinhua
Attendance: 1,248
Referee: Yousif Saeed Hasan (Iraq)

21 September 2023
16:00

Chinese Taipei	1–0	Indonesia
Chin Wen-yen 47'	Report

Zhejiang Normal University East Stadium, Jinhua
Attendance: 894
Referee: Mohamed Javiz (Maldives)

24 September 2023
16:00

Kyrgyzstan	4–1	Chinese Taipei
Abilov 45+2'; Huang Tzu-Ming 55' (o.g.); Toktosunov 62'; Sharshenbekov 90+1'	Report	Chen Po-Liang 34' (pen.)

Jinhua Stadium, Jinhua
Attendance: 16,973
Referee: Feras Taweel (Syria)

=== Women's tournament ===
Roster

Group B

Pos	Team	Pld	W	D	L	GF	GA	GD	Pts	Qualification
1	Chinese Taipei	2	2	0	0	3	1	+2	6	Knockout stage
2	Thailand	2	1	0	1	1	1	0	3	Knockout stage
3	India	2	0	0	2	1	3	−2	0	

Source: Football – Women – Groups
Rules for classification: Group stage tiebreakers
21 September 2023
19:30 UTC+8

Chinese Taipei	2–1	India
Lai Li-chin 68'; Su Yu-hsuan 84'	Report	Anju Tamang 46'

Wenzhou Olympic Sports Center Stadium, Wenzhou
Attendance: 5,681
Referee: Casey Reibelt (Australia)

27 September 2023
19:30 UTC+8

Thailand	0–1	Chinese Taipei
	Report	Phornphirun Philawan 36' (o.g.)

Wenzhou Olympic Sports Center Stadium, Wenzhou
Attendance: 14,050
Referee: Kim Yu-jeong (KOR)

Quarter-finals

30 September 2023
15:00 UTC+8

Chinese Taipei	1–2 (a.e.t.)	Uzbekistan
Su Yu-hsuan 86'	Report	Khabibullaeva 52'; Zoirova 101'

Linping Sports Center Stadium, Hangzhou
Attendance: 7,515
Referee: Law Bik Chi (Hong Kong)

== Go ==
Summary

Athlete	Event	Preliminary Round							Quarterfinals	Semifinal	Final	
Athlete	Event	Opposition Score	Opposition Score	Opposition Score	Opposition Score	Opposition Score	Opposition Score	Rank	Opposition Score	Opposition Score	Opposition Score	Rank
Hsu Hao-hung	Men's individual	Lee (MAS); W 2–0	Sam (MAC); W 2–0	Shin (KOR); L 0–2	Yang (CHN); L 0–2	Chan (HKG); W 2–0	Shibano (JPN); W 2–0	3 Q	Park (KOR); W 2–0	Shin (KOR); W 2–0	Ke (CHN); W 2–0	1st place, gold medalist(s)
Lai Jyun-fu	Men's individual	Chan (HKG); W 2–0	Ke (CHN); L 0–2	Chang (MAS); W 2–0	Sornarra (THA); W 2–0	Park (KOR); L 0–2	Bye	4 Q	Shin (KOR); L 0–2	Did not advance		
Hsu Hao-hung; Lai Jyun-fu; Hsu Chia-yuan; Wang Yuan-jyun; Lin Chun-yen; Hsu Ching-en	Men's team	South Korea (KOR); L 0–2	Mongolia (MGL); W 2–0	Malaysia (MAS); W 2–0	Thailand (THA); W 2–0	Japan (JPN); W 2–0	China (CHN); L 0–2	3 Q	—N/a	China (CHN); L 0–2	Japan (JPN); L 0–2	4
Joanne Missingham; Lu Yu-hua; Yang Tzu-hsuan; Li Chia-hsing	Women's team	South Korea (KOR); L 0–2	Malaysia (MAS); W 2–0	Japan (JPN); L 0–2	Mongolia (MGL); W 2–0	China (CHN); L 0–2	—N/a	5	Did not advance			

== Judo ==
=== Men ===
Athlete	Event	Round of 32	Round of 16	Quarterfinals	Semifinal	Repechage	Final	
Athlete	Event	Opposition Score	Opposition Score	Opposition Score	Opposition Score	Opposition Score	Opposition Score	Rank
Yang Yung-wei	−60 kg	Bye	Yrysbekov (KGZ); W 10–00	Kondo (JPN); W 10–00	Enkhtaivany (MGL); W 10–00	—N/a	Lee (KOR); W 01–00	1st place, gold medalist(s)
Cheng Yen-ming	−66 kg	Putra (INA); W 01–00	Aibek Uulu (KGZ); L 00–10	Did not advance				
Chang Wei-cheng	−90 kg	Bye	Ustopiriyon (TJK); L 00–10	Did not advance				

=== Women ===
Athlete	Event	Round of 16	Quarterfinals	Semifinal	Repechage	Final	
Athlete	Event	Opposition Score	Opposition Score	Opposition Score	Opposition Score	Opposition Score	Rank
Lin Chen-hao	−48 kg	Jon (PRK); L 00–01	Did not advance				
Lin Hsu-wan-chu	−52 kg	Shishime (JPN); L 00–10	Did not advance				
Lien Chen-ling	−57 kg	Zholdosheva (KGZ); W 10–00	Nishanbayeva (KAZ); W 10–00	Cai (CHN); W 01–00	—N/a	Tamaoki (JPN); W 01–00	1st place, gold medalist(s)
Liao Yu-jung	−70 kg	Nanong (THA); W 10–00	Feng (KAZ); L 00–10	Did not advance	Salinas (PHI); W 11–00	Matniyazova (UZB); L 00–10	5
Hsu Wang Shu-huei	−78 kg	Narmukhamedova (KGZ); W 01–00	Takayama (JPN); L 00–10	Did not advance	Otgonbayar (MGL); L 00–10	Did not advance	7
Tsai Jia-wen	+78 kg	Satjadet (THA); W 10–00	Xu (CHN); L 00–10	Did not advance	Maan (IND); L 00–10	Did not advance	7

== Kabaddi ==
Chinese Taipei will send its men's team after they finished as runners-up in the Bangabandhu Cup 2023 held in Bangladesh.

Team	Event	Group stage					Semifinal	Final	
Team	Event	Opposition Score	Opposition Score	Opposition Score	Opposition Score	Rank	Opposition Score	Opposition Score	Rank
Chinese Taipei men	Men's tournament	Thailand; W 45–24	Japan; W 38–22	Bangladesh; W 31–18	India; L 27–50	2 Q	Iran; L 24–47	Did not advance	3rd place, bronze medalist(s)
Chinese Taipei women	Women's tournament	India; D 34–34	Thailand; W 37–28	South Korea; W 35–24	—N/a	2 Q	Iran; W 35–24	India; L 25–26	2nd place, silver medalist(s)

== Rowing ==
Women

Athlete	Event	Heats		Repechage		Semi-finals		Finals	
Athlete	Event	Time	Rank	Time	Rank	Time	Rank	Time	Rank
Huang Yi-ting	Single	8:08.15	2 SA/B	Bye		8:14.36	3 FA	7:56.76	4
Hsieh I-ching; Lee Kuan-yi	Lightweight double	7:25.60	3 R	8:09.79	5 FB	—N/a		7:41.62	11

== Sailing ==
Speed

Athlete	Event	Race																Total	Net	Rank
Athlete	Event	1	2	3	4	5	6	7	8	9	10	11	12	13	14	15	16	Total	Net	Rank
Hou Jia-Lin	Women's Kite	~~(4)~~	4	4	4	4	4	4	4	~~(5)~~; DNS	4	4	4	~~(5)~~; DNF	4	4	4	66	52	4

== Sport climbing ==
Speed

Athlete	Event	Qualification		Round of 16	Quarter-finals	Semi-finals	Final / BM	
Athlete	Event	Best	Rank	Opposition Time	Opposition Time	Opposition Time	Opposition Time	Rank
Lin Chia-hsiang	Men's	6.109	14 Q	Katibin (INA); L 6.176–5.167	Did not advance			

Combined

Athlete	Event	Qualification				Semi-finals				Final			
Athlete	Event	Boulder Point	Lead Point	Total	Rank	Boulder Point	Lead Point	Total	Rank	Boulder Point	Lead Point	Total	Rank
Lee Hung-ying	Women's	64.9	28.1	93.0	8 Q	52.53	24	76.53	9	Cancelled (Note: The women's boulder and lead final has been cancelled due to rain and safety of the athletes. The semi-finals result would be used as final result.)			

== Swimming ==
=== Men ===
Athlete	Event	Heats		Finals	
Athlete	Event	Time	Rank	Time	Rank
Wang Kuan-Hung	100 metre butterfly	Withdrew			
Wang Kuan-Hung	200 metre butterfly	1:57.01	3 Q	1:54.53	2nd place, silver medalist(s)
Wang Hsing-hao	200 metre individual medley	2:00.62	5 Q	2:00.15	6
Wang Hsing-hao	400 metre individual medley	4:23.70	8 Q	4:18.68	6
Chuang Mu-lun	50 metre backstroke	25.57	7 Q	25.57	7
Chuang Mu-lun	100 metre backstroke	55.06	7 Q	54.88	7
Chuang Mu-lun	200 metre backstroke	2:04.10	10	Did not advance	
Tsai Bing-rong	100 metre breaststroke	1:02.84	15	Did not advance	
Tsai Bing-rong	200 metre breaststroke	2:15.87	10	Did not advance	
Wang Kuan-Hung; Wang Hsing-hao; Chuang Mu-lun; Tsai Bing-rong	4 × 100 metre medley relay	3:43.03	6 Q	3:38.35; NR	4

=== Women ===
Athlete	Event	Heats		Finals	
Athlete	Event	Time	Rank	Time	Rank
Huang Mei-chian	50 metre freestyle	25.63	8 Q	25.70	8
Huang Mei-chian	50 metre butterfly	26.88	8 Q	26.89	6
Lin Pei-wun	50 metre breaststroke	32.15	15	Did not advance	
Lin Pei-wun	100 metre breaststroke	1:10.00	9 R	Did not advance	
Wu Yi-en	50 metre backstroke	29.70	15	Did not advance	
Wu Yi-en	100 metre backstroke	1:04.39	15	Did not advance	
Hsu An	100 metre butterfly	1:01.73	11	Did not advance	
Hsu An	100 metre backstroke	1:04.61	17	Did not advance	
Huang Mei-chian; Lin Pei-wun; Wu Yi-en; Hsu An	4 × 100 metre medley relay	4:14.43	7 Q	4:11.25; NR	6

=== Mixed ===
Athlete	Event	Heats		Finals	
Athlete	Event	Time	Rank	Time	Rank
Wang Kuan-Hung; Chuang Mu-lun; Huang Mei-chian; Lin Pei-wun	4 × 100 metre medley relay	4:02.71	8 Q	3:56.69; NR	7

=== Marathon swimming ===
Athlete	Event	FInal	
Athlete	Event	Time	Rank
Cho Cheng-chi	Men's 10km	1:56:09.8	5
Teng Yu-wun	Women's 10km	2:08:05.5	4

== Volleyball ==
=== Indoor volleyball ===
Team	Event	Group Stage			Playoffs	Quarterfinals / Pl.	Semifinals / Pl.	Final / BM / Pl.	
Team	Event	Opposition Score	Opposition Score	Rank	Opposition Score	Opposition Score	Opposition Score	Opposition Score	Rank
Chinese Taipei men's	Men's tournament	Pakistan; L 0–3	Mongolia; W 3–0	2	India; L 0–3	Did not advance	Kazakhstan; L 2–3	Bahrain; W 3–1	11
Chinese Taipei women's	Women's tournament	Mongolia; W 3–0	Thailand; L 1–3						
