= Swimming at the 2024 Summer Olympics – Women's 100-metre backstroke =

Women's 100-metre backstroke at the Games of the XXXIII Olympiad
- Medal ceremony for the event
- Venue: Paris La Défense Arena
- Dates: 29 July 2024 (heats and semifinals); 30 July 2024 (final)
- Competitors: 36 from 29 nations
- Winning time: 57.33 OR

Medalists
1st place, gold medalist(s)		Kaylee McKeown	Australia
2nd place, silver medalist(s)		Regan Smith	United States
3rd place, bronze medalist(s)		Katharine Berkoff	United States

The women's 100-metre backstroke event at the 2024 Summer Olympics was held from 29 to 30 July 2024 at Paris La Défense Arena, which was converted to a swimming pool for the swimming events.

The US' Regan Smith and Australia's defending champion Kaylee McKeown were the favourites to win the event, with Canada's Kylie Masse and the US' Katharine Berkoff also likely medallists. In the heats, Spain's Carmen Weiler set her country's national record at 59.57. In the final, Smith and Masse led at the halfway point, but McKeown ended up winning the gold with a new Olympic record of 57.33. Smith won silver and Berkoff won bronze.

== Background ==
The US' defending Olympic bronze medallist and 2022 World Champion Regan Smith broke the world record at the 2024 US Olympic Trials with a time of 57.13. Defending Olympic champion Kaylee McKeown from Australia held the previous world record, and won the event at the 2023 World Championships. She swam 57.41 at the Australian Olympic Trials. Canada's Kylie Masse won the silver medal at the previous Olympics in the event, and she finished second at the 2023 Championships. Other contenders included the US' Katharine Berkoff, who swam 57.83 at the US Trials, and Australia's Iona Anderson, who swam 58.43 at the Australian Trials. Both SwimSwam and Swimming World predicted that Smith would win, McKeown would come second and Berkoff would come third.

The event was held at Paris La Défense Arena, which was converted to a swimming pool for the swimming events.

== Qualification ==
Each National Olympic Committee (NOC) was permitted to enter a maximum of two qualified athletes in each individual event, but only if both of them had attained the Olympic Qualifying Time (OQT). For this event, the OQT was 59.99 seconds. World Aquatics then filled the rest of the event places with athletes qualifying through universality; NOCs were given one event entry for each gender, which could be used by any athlete regardless of qualification time, providing the spaces had not already been taken by athletes from that nation who had achieved the OQT. In total, 20 athletes qualified through achieving the OQT, while 16 athletes qualified through universality places.

Top 10 fastest qualification times
Swimmer	Country	Time	Competition
Regan Smith	United States	57.13	2024 United States Olympic Trials
Kaylee McKeown	Australia	57.33	2023 World Aquatics World Cup
Katharine Berkoff	United States	57.83	2024 United States Olympic Trials
Kylie Masse	Canada	57.94	2024 Canadian Olympic Trials
Iona Anderson	Australia	58.43	2024 Australian Olympic Trials
Emma Terebo	France	58.79	2024 French Elite Championships
Ingrid Wilm	Canada	58.80	2024 Canadian Olympic Trials
Wan Letian	China	59.02	2024 Chinese Championships
Danielle Hill	Ireland	59.11	2024 Irish Championships
Béryl Gastaldello	France	59.17	2024 French Elite Championships

== Heats ==
Five heats (preliminary rounds) took place on 29 July 2024, starting at 11:13. (Note: All times are Central European Summer Time (UTC+2)) The swimmers with the best 16 times in the heats advanced to the semifinals. Berkoff qualified with the fastest time of 57.99, Smith qualified in second and McKeown in third. Carmen Weiler broke Spain's national record by 0.19 seconds, setting it at 59.57 to qualify.

Results
Rank	Heat	Lane	Swimmer	Nation	Time	Notes
1	3	4	Katharine Berkoff	United States	57.99	Q
2	5	4	Regan Smith	United States	58.45	Q
3	4	4	Kaylee McKeown	Australia	58.48	Q
4	5	5	Kylie Masse	Canada	59.06	Q
5	3	5	Emma Terebo	France	59.10	Q
6	5	6	Béryl Gastaldello	France	59.31	Q
7	4	5	Iona Anderson	Australia	59.37	Q
8	4	2	Carmen Weiler	Spain	59.57	Q, NR
9	4	7	Roos Vanotterdijk	Belgium	59.68	Q
10	3	7	Kira Toussaint	Netherlands	59.84	Q
11	4	3	Wan Letian	China	59.87	Q
12	5	3	Ingrid Wilm	Canada	1:00.06	Q
13	5	2	Maaike de Waard	Netherlands	1:00.12	Q
14	4	6	Wang Xue'er	China	1:00.15	Q
15	4	1	Louise Hansson	Sweden	1:00.26	Q
16	3	3	Danielle Hill	Ireland	1:00.40	Q
17	5	7	Adela Piskorska	Poland	1:00.47	
18	3	2	Kathleen Dawson	Great Britain	1:00.69	
19	3	6	Medi Eira Harris	Great Britain	1:00.85	
20	5	1	Anastasiya Shkurdai	Individual Neutral Athletes	1:00.94	
21	3	1	Celia Pulido	Mexico	1:01.10	
22	5	8	Nika Sharafutdinova	Ukraine	1:01.47	
23	4	8	Emma Harvey	Bermuda	1:01.78	
24	3	8	Gabriela Georgieva	Bulgaria	1:02.16	
25	2	5	Aviv Barzelay	Israel	1:02.30	
26	2	4	Xeniya Ignatova	Kazakhstan	1:02.51	
27	2	6	Zuri Ferguson	Trinidad and Tobago	1:02.75	
28	2	2	Lucero Mejía	Guatemala	1:03.42	
29	2	3	Cindy Cheung	Hong Kong	1:03.45	
30	1	4	Ganga Seneviratne	Sri Lanka	1:04.26	
31	2	8	Amani Al-Obaidli	Bahrain	1:04.27	NR
32	2	1	Celina Márquez	El Salvador	1:04.55	
33	2	7	Elizabeth Jiménez	Dominican Republic	1:04.99	
34	1	3	Denise Donelli	Mozambique	1:08.73	
35	1	5	Aýnura Primowa	Turkmenistan	1:10.17	
36	1	6	Maleek Al-Mukhtar	Libya	1:10.99	

== Semifinals ==
Two semifinals took place on 29 July, starting at 21:01. The swimmers with the best eight times in the semifinals advanced to the final. Smith won the first semifinal with a time of 57.97 seconds, while McKeown won the second in 57.99.

Results
Rank	Heat	Lane	Swimmer	Nation	Time	Notes
1	1	4	Regan Smith	United States	57.97	Q
2	2	5	Kaylee McKeown	Australia	57.99	Q
3	2	4	Katharine Berkoff	United States	58.27	Q
4	2	6	Iona Anderson	Australia	58.63	Q
5	1	5	Kylie Masse	Canada	58.82	Q
6	1	7	Ingrid Wilm	Canada	59.10	Q
7	1	3	Béryl Gastaldello	France	59.29	Q
8	2	3	Emma Terebo	France	59.50	Q
9	1	6	Carmen Weiler	Spain	59.72	
10	2	2	Roos Vanotterdijk	Belgium	59.86	
11	1	1	Wang Xue'er	China	59.89	
12	2	7	Wan Letian	China	1:00.06	
13	2	1	Maaike de Waard	Netherlands	1:00.22	
14	1	2	Kira Toussaint	Netherlands	1:00.37	
15	2	8	Louise Hansson	Sweden	1:00.47	
16	1	8	Danielle Hill	Ireland	1:00.80	

== Final ==
The final took place at 21:00 on 30 July. Smith and Masse led at the 50 metre mark, both pushing off the halfway wall with a split time of 28.02. Berkoff split third with 28.05 and McKeown fourth with 28.08. Over the last 50 metres, McKeown elevated herself to first to win the gold medal with a time of 57.33 seconds. Smith won the silver with 57.66, Berkoff won bronze with 57.98 and Masse finished fourth.

Smith spent the longest underwater and had the fastest average underwater pace, (Note: Swimmers typically spend around 15 metres off the start and turn underwater doing the dolphin kick.) while McKeown had the fastest pace during the non-underwater sections. McKeown did 70 strokes throughout the race, (Note: Each half circumduction of the arm in backstroke counts as one stroke.) which was the least of the top 4 swimmers; Masse did 75, Smith did 76 and Berkoff did 77.

McKeown's winning time of 57.33 broke her own Olympic Record from Tokyo, matched her former world record in the event and won her her fourth gold medal. She later went on to win the 200 metre backstroke as well, which made her the first swimmer to win both the 100 metre and 200 metre backstroke events at consecutive Olympics. Later at the Paris Games, Smith broke McKeown's Olympic record with a time of 57.28, which she swam in the opening leg of the women's 4 × 100 metre medley relay. Berkoff's bronze was the US' 3000th Olympic medal, and their 600th swimming medal.

Results
Rank	Lane	Swimmer	Nation	Time	Notes
1st place, gold medalist(s)	5	Kaylee McKeown	Australia	57.33	OR, =OC
2nd place, silver medalist(s)	4	Regan Smith	United States	57.66	
3rd place, bronze medalist(s)	3	Katharine Berkoff	United States	57.98	
4	2	Kylie Masse	Canada	58.29	
5	6	Iona Anderson	Australia	58.98	
6	7	Ingrid Wilm	Canada	59.25	
7	8	Emma Terebo	France	59.40	
8	1	Béryl Gastaldello	France	59.80	

Statistics
Name	15 metre split (s)	50 metre split (s)	50–65 metre split (s)	Time (s)	Stroke rate (strokes/min)
Kaylee McKeown	6.67	28.08	7.52	57.33	48.2
Regan Smith	6.69	28.02	7.45	57.66	53.1
Katharine Berkoff	6.75	28.05	7.39	57.98	53.8
Kylie Masse	6.81	28.02	7.70	58.29	50.8
Iona Anderson	7.17	28.47	8.09	58.98	50.7
Ingrid Wilm	6.87	28.69	8.07	59.25	44.2
Emma Terebo	7.18	28.79	8.39	59.40	49.0
Béryl Gastaldello	6.86	28.80	8.06	59.80	49.2
