= Swimming at the 2022 Asian Games – Women's 50 metre backstroke =

Women's 50 metre backstroke at the 2022 Asian Games
- Venue: Hangzhou Olympic Expo Aquatics Center
- Date: 25 September 2023
- Competitors: 29 from 21 nations

Medalists
gold medal	Wang Xueer	China
silver medal	Wan Letian	China
bronze medal	Miki Takahashi	Japan

The women's 50 metre backstroke event at the 2022 Asian Games took place on 25 September 2023 at the Hangzhou Olympic Expo Center.

== Schedule ==
All times are China Standard Time (UTC+08:00)

Date	Time	Event
Monday, 25 September 2023	10:11	Heats
Monday, 25 September 2023	19:36	Final

== Records ==
Prior to this competition, the existing world, Asian and Games records were as follows.

World Record	Liu Xiang (CHN)	26.98	Jakarta, Indonesia	21 August 2018
Asian Record	Liu Xiang (CHN)	26.98	Jakarta, Indonesia	21 August 2018
Games Record	Liu Xiang (CHN)	26.98	Jakarta, Indonesia	21 August 2018

== Results ==
=== Heats ===
Rank	Heat	Athlete	Time	Notes
1	3	Wang Xueer (CHN)	27.59	
2	4	Wan Letian (CHN)	27.80	
3	4	Miki Takahashi (JPN)	28.24	
4	3	Stephanie Au (HKG)	28.37	
5	2	Lee Eun-ji (KOR)	28.80	
6	2	Kayla Sanchez (PHI)	28.86	
7	2	Xeniya Ignatova (KAZ)	28.95	
8	4	Teia Salvino (PHI)	29.08	
9	4	Levenia Sim (SGP)	29.19	
10	4	Angel Gabriella Yus (INA)	29.44	
11	3	Ai Soma (JPN)	29.50	
12	3	Toto Wong (HKG)	29.54	
13	3	Saovanee Boonamphai (THA)	29.59	
14	2	Valerie Tarazi (PLE)	29.64	
15	4	Wu Yi-en (TPE)	29.70	
16	2	Masniari Wolf (INA)	29.79	
17	2	Faith Khoo (SGP)	29.85	
18	3	Maana Patel (IND)	30.06	
19	4	Enkh-Amgalangiin Ariuntamir (MGL)	30.16	
20	1	Elizaveta Rogozhnikova (KGZ)	30.37	
21	2	Mia Millar (THA)	30.52	
22	3	Phạm Thị Vân (VIE)	30.55	
23	4	Ganga Seneviratne (SRI)	31.73	
24	3	Kheun Chanchakriya (CAM)	32.20	
25	2	Cheang Weng Lam (MAC)	32.22	
26	1	Mönkhbatyn Amina (MGL)	35.04	
27	1	Fatima Adnan Lotia (PAK)	35.38	
28	1	Hamna Ahmed (MDV)	35.62	
29	1	Ekaterina Bordachyova (TJK)	36.44	

=== Final ===
Rank	Athlete	Time	Notes
1st place, gold medalist(s)	Wang Xueer (CHN)	27.35	
2nd place, silver medalist(s)	Wan Letian (CHN)	27.41	
3rd place, bronze medalist(s)	Miki Takahashi (JPN)	28.21	
4	Stephanie Au (HKG)	28.35	
5	Lee Eun-ji (KOR)	28.60	
6	Kayla Sanchez (PHI)	28.66	
7	Xeniya Ignatova (KAZ)	28.72	
8	Teia Salvino (PHI)	28.79	
