= Swimming at the 2022 Asian Games – Women's 100 metre backstroke =

Women's 100 metre backstroke at the 2022 Asian Games
- Venue: Hangzhou Olympic Expo Aquatics Center
- Date: 27 September 2023
- Competitors: 27 from 18 nations

Medalists
gold medal	Wan Letian	China
silver medal	Wang Xueer	China
bronze medal	Lee Eun-ji	South Korea

The women's 100 metre backstroke event at the 2022 Asian Games took place on 27 September 2023 at the Hangzhou Olympic Expo Center.

== Schedule ==
All times are China Standard Time (UTC+08:00)

Date	Time	Event
Wednesday, 27 September 2023	10:28	Heats
Wednesday, 27 September 2023	19:42	Final

== Records ==
Prior to this competition, the existing world, Asian and Games records were as follows.

World Record	Kaylee McKeown (AUS)	57.45	Adelaide, Australia	13 June 2021
Asian Record	Aya Terakawa (JPN)	58.70	Barcelona, Spain	4 August 2013
Games Record	Zhao Jing (CHN)	58.94	Guangzhou, China	13 November 2010

== Results ==
=== Heats ===
Rank	Heat	Athlete	Time	Notes
1	4	Wang Xueer (CHN)	1:00.87	
2	3	Miki Takahashi (JPN)	1:01.29	
2	4	Lee Eun-ji (KOR)	1:01.29	
4	4	Stephanie Au (HKG)	1:01.34	
5	3	Wan Letian (CHN)	1:01.43	
6	2	Rio Shirai (JPN)	1:01.58	
7	2	Levenia Sim (SGP)	1:01.84	
8	4	Xeniya Ignatova (KAZ)	1:01.92	
9	3	Kayla Sanchez (PHI)	1:01.94	
10	2	Teia Salvino (PHI)	1:02.09	
11	3	Faith Khoo (SGP)	1:03.21	
12	4	Angel Gabriella Yus (INA)	1:03.33	
13	3	Maana Patel (IND)	1:03.55	
14	1	Valerie Tarazi (PLE)	1:04.25	
15	2	Wu Yi-en (TPE)	1:04.39	
16	3	Toto Wong (HKG)	1:04.44	
17	4	Hsu An (TPE)	1:04.61	
18	3	Mia Millar (THA)	1:05.40	
19	2	Masniari Wolf (INA)	1:05.54	
20	2	Ganga Seneviratne (SRI)	1:07.21	
21	4	Saovanee Boonamphai (THA)	1:07.32	
22	4	Enkh-Amgalangiin Ariuntamir (MGL)	1:07.61	
23	2	Cheang Weng Lam (MAC)	1:08.89	
24	3	Kheun Chanchakriya (CAM)	1:10.10	
25	2	Uuganbayaryn Misheel (MGL)	1:15.22	
26	1	Hamna Ahmed (MDV)	1:18.91	
27	1	Fatima Adnan Lotia (PAK)	1:19.22	

=== Final ===
Rank	Athlete	Time	Notes
1st place, gold medalist(s)	Wan Letian (CHN)	59.38	
2nd place, silver medalist(s)	Wang Xueer (CHN)	59.52	
3rd place, bronze medalist(s)	Lee Eun-ji (KOR)	1:00.03	
4	Stephanie Au (HKG)	1:00.78	
5	Miki Takahashi (JPN)	1:01.01	
6	Rio Shirai (JPN)	1:01.36	
7	Levenia Sim (SGP)	1:01.89	
8	Xeniya Ignatova (KAZ)	1:02.05	
