= Swimming at the 2026 Asian Games – Women's 50 metre backstroke =

Women's 50 metre backstroke at the 2026 Asian Games
- Venue: Tokyo Aquatics Centre
- Date: 21 September 2026
- Competitors: 31 from 16 nations

Medalists
gold medal	Wan Letian	China
silver medal	Wang Xueer	China
bronze medal	Kim Seung-won	South Korea

The women's 50 metre backstroke event at the 2026 Asian Games took place on 21 September 2026 at the Tokyo Aquatics Centre. China's Wan Letian won the gold medal in 27.47 seconds, finishing 0.19 seconds ahead of fellow Chinese swimmer Wang Xueer, who won the silver medal in 27.66 seconds. South Korea's Kim Seung-won won the bronze medal in 27.72 seconds.

== Schedule ==
All times are Japan Standard Time (UTC+09:00)

Date	Time	Event
Monday, 21 September 2026	10:06	Heats
Monday, 21 September 2026	17:06	Final

== Records ==
Prior to this competition, the existing world, Asian and Games records were as follows.

World Record	Sara Curtis (ITA)	26.56	Paris, France	13 August 2026
Asian Record	Liu Xiang (CHN)	26.98	Jakarta, Indonesia	21 August 2018
Games Record	Liu Xiang (CHN)	26.98	Jakarta, Indonesia	21 August 2018

== Results ==
=== Heats ===
Rank	Heat	Athlete	Time	Notes
1	4	Wan Letian (CHN)	27.66	Q
2	2	Kim Seung-won (KOR)	27.91	Q
3	3	Wang Xueer (CHN)	28.15	Q
4	3	Kayla Sanchez (PHI)	28.24	Q
5	4	Rio Shirai (JPN)	28.35	Q
6	4	Miri Sasaki (JPN)	28.36	Q
7	4	Xeniya Ignatova (KAZ)	28.37	Q
8	2	Chang Ya-jia (TPE)	28.53	Q
9	3	Lee Eun-ji (KOR)	28.55	Q
10	4	Teia Salvino (PHI)	29.14	Q
11	3	Ng Cheuk Yan (HKG)	29.18	Reserve
12	3	Flairene Candrea (INA)	29.24	Reserve
13	2	Sim Levenia Entong (SGP)	29.44	
14	2	Masniari Wolf (INA)	29.45	
15	2	Sofiya Abubakirova (KAZ)	29.60	
16	2	Julia Shu Ning Yeo (SGP)	29.81	
17	2	Parizod Abdukarimova (UZB)	29.96	
=17	4	Chan Tsz Yu Ashley (HKG)	29.96	
19	3	Mia Millar (THA)	30.00	
20	4	Amani Alobaidli (BRN)	30.10	
21	3	Ariuntamir Enkh-amgalan (MGL)	30.32	
22	4	Valerie Tarazi (PLE)	30.63	
23	3	Wong Un Lao (MAC)	30.86	
=23	1	Chan Mei Yan (MAC)	30.86	
25	3	Farah Fares (PLE)	31.52	
26	4	Noor Taha (BRN)	31.57	
27	2	Aarya Maharjan (NEP)	33.40	
28	2	Sodonchimeg Sodovjamts (MGL)	34.76	
29	1	Farrah Alsabih (KUW)	35.47	
30	4	Malaika Linda Imran (MDV)	35.90	
31	1	Jana Hussain (KUW)	37.18	

=== Final ===
Rank	Athlete	Time	Notes
1st place, gold medalist(s)	Wan Letian (CHN)	27.47	
2nd place, silver medalist(s)	Wang Xueer (CHN)	27.66	
3rd place, bronze medalist(s)	Kim Seung-won (KOR)	27.72	
4	Rio Shirai (JPN)	28.05	
5	Miri Sasaki (JPN)	28.19	
=5	Kayla Sanchez (PHI)	28.19	
7	Lee Eun-ji (KOR)	28.53	
8	Xeniya Ignatova (KAZ)	28.55	
9	Chang Ya-jia (TPE)	28.96	
10	Teia Salvino (PHI)	29.02	
