= Swimming at the 2014 Asian Games – Women's 100 metre backstroke =

Women's 100 metre backstroke at the 2014 Asian Games
- Venue: Munhak Park Tae-hwan Aquatics Center
- Date: 24 September 2014
- Competitors: 17 from 12 nations

Medalists
gold medal	Fu Yuanhui	China
silver medal	Yekaterina Rudenko	Kazakhstan
bronze medal	Wang Xueer	China

The women's 100 metre backstroke event at the 2014 Asian Games took place on 24 September 2014 at Munhak Park Tae-hwan Aquatics Center.

== Schedule ==
All times are Korea Standard Time (UTC+09:00)

Date	Time	Event
Wednesday, 24 September 2014	09:00	Heats
Wednesday, 24 September 2014	20:16	Final

== Records ==
Prior to this competition, the existing world, Asian and Games records were as follows.

World Record	Gemma Spofforth (GBR)	58.12	Rome, Italy	28 July 2009
Asian Record	Aya Terakawa (JPN)	58.70	Barcelona, Spain	4 August 2013
Games Record	Zhao Jing (CHN)	58.94	Guangzhou, China	13 November 2010

== Results ==
=== Heats ===
Rank	Heat	Athlete	Time	Notes
1	2	Yekaterina Rudenko (KAZ)	1:01.10	
2	2	Wang Xueer (CHN)	1:01.39	
3	3	Fu Yuanhui (CHN)	1:01.88	
4	3	Miyuki Takemura (JPN)	1:02.03	
5	1	Shiho Sakai (JPN)	1:02.07	
6	3	Claudia Lau (HKG)	1:02.52	
7	2	Lee Da-lin (KOR)	1:02.67	
8	1	Stephanie Au (HKG)	1:02.86	
9	3	Nguyễn Thị Ánh Viên (VIE)	1:03.13	
10	1	Yulduz Kuchkarova (UZB)	1:03.18	
11	2	Hsu An (TPE)	1:04.65	
12	1	Yu Yi-chen (TPE)	1:05.26	
13	1	Erica Vong (MAC)	1:06.14	
14	3	Tan Jing E (SIN)	1:06.61	
15	2	Jenjira Srisa-ard (THA)	1:11.50	
16	3	Saintöriin Nomun (MGL)	1:14.90	
17	2	Bayaryn Yesüi (MGL)	1:18.47	

=== Final ===
Rank	Athlete	Time	Notes
1st place, gold medalist(s)	Fu Yuanhui (CHN)	59.95	
2nd place, silver medalist(s)	Yekaterina Rudenko (KAZ)	1:00.61	
3rd place, bronze medalist(s)	Wang Xueer (CHN)	1:01.09	
4	Shiho Sakai (JPN)	1:01.35	
5	Miyuki Takemura (JPN)	1:01.70	
6	Stephanie Au (HKG)	1:02.21	
7	Claudia Lau (HKG)	1:02.78	
8	Lee Da-lin (KOR)	1:02.83	
