= Swimming at the 2024 Summer Olympics – Women's 4 × 100-metre medley relay =

Women's 4 × 100-metre medley relay at the Games of the XXXIII Olympiad
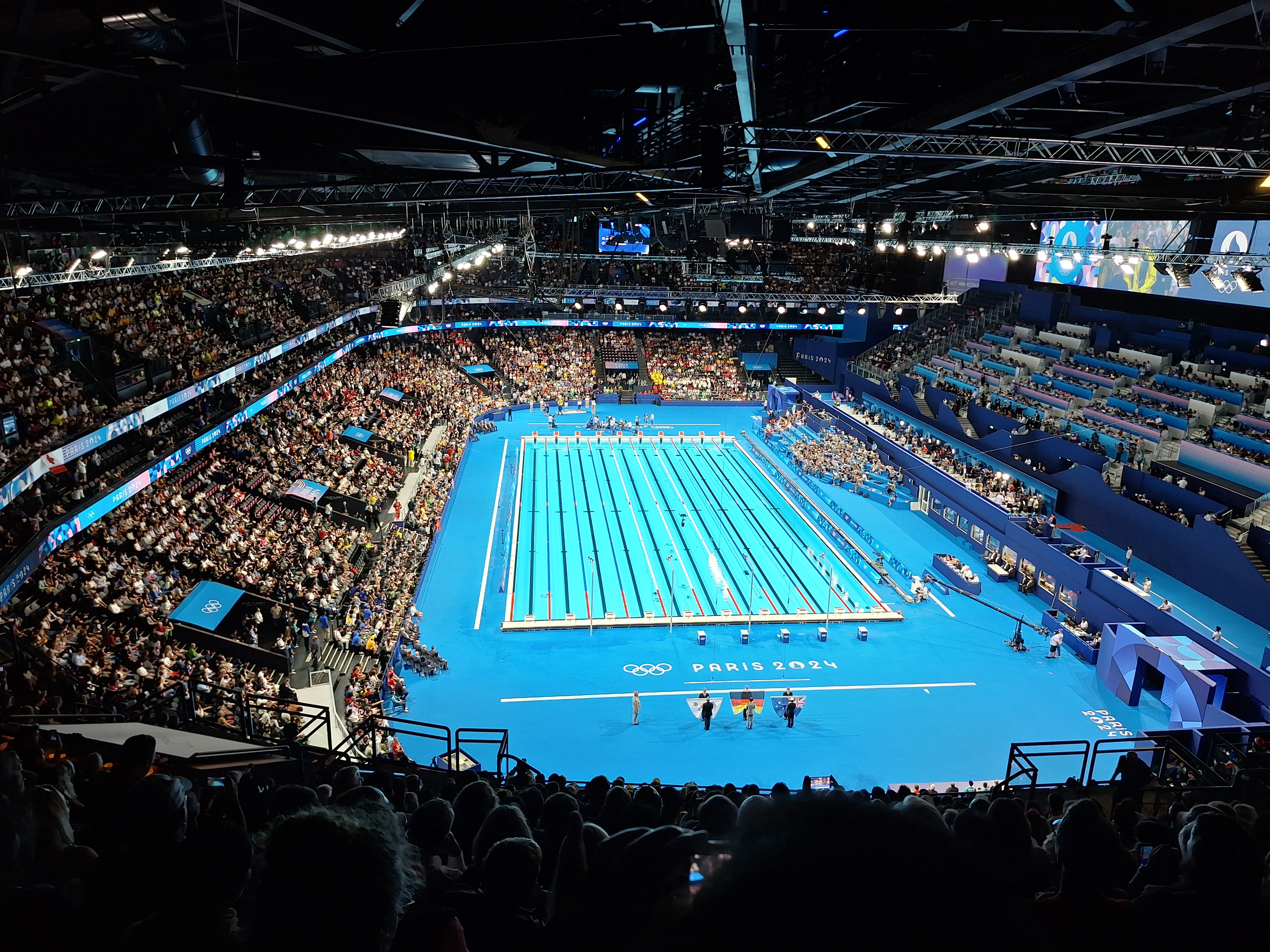
- Paris La Défense Arena after it was converted to a swimming pool for the swimming events
- Venue: Paris La Défense Arena
- Dates: 3 and 4 August 2024 (heats and final)
- Competitors: 79 from 16 nations
- Teams: 16 teams
- Winning time: 3:49.63 WR

Medalists
1st place, gold medalist(s)		Regan Smith, Lilly King, Gretchen Walsh, Torri Huske, Katharine Berkoff*, Emma Weber*, Alex Shackell*, Kate Douglass*	United States
2nd place, silver medalist(s)		Kaylee McKeown, Jenna Strauch, Emma McKeon, Mollie O'Callaghan, Iona Anderson*, Ella Ramsay*, Alexandria Perkins*, Meg Harris*	Australia
3rd place, bronze medalist(s)		Wan Letian, Tang Qianting, Zhang Yufei, Yang Junxuan, Wang Xue'er*, Yu Yiting*, Wu Qingfeng* *Indicates the swimmer only competed in the preliminary heats.	China

The women's 4 × 100-metre medley relay event at the 2024 Summer Olympics was held on 3 and 4 August 2024 at Paris La Défense Arena, which was converted to a swimming pool for the swimming events. Since an Olympic size swimming pool is 50 metres long, each swimmer had to swim two lengths of the pool with their respective stroke. (Note: In medley swimming, each competitor swims one of the four strokes. In a medley relay, the stroke order is backstroke first, followed by breaststroke, then butterfly, and finally freestyle.)

The US were considered the favourites to win the event, while Australia, China and Sweden were also considered to be in contention. All four teams progressed to the final, where the US won with a new world record of 3:49.63, Australia finished second with 3:53.11 and China finished third with 3:53.23. The US' Regan Smith swam an Olympic record of 57.28 in the 100 metres backstroke event as the first swimmer in the relay.

== Background ==
Australia won the event at the previous Olympics, while the United States won the event at the 2022 and 2023 World Championships. Swimming World called the US the "big favorites" due to three of their relay participants holding the world record in the individual events they would likely be swimming in the relay. Along with Australia and the US, China and Sweden were also likely medal challengers.

Both SwimSwam and Swimming World predicted the US would win, Australia would take second and China would finish third.

The event was held at Paris La Défense Arena, which was converted to a swimming pool for the swimming events.

== Qualification ==
Each National Olympic Committee could enter one team, and there were a total of sixteen qualifications places available. The first three qualifying places were taken by the top three finishers at the 2023 World Championships, and the final thirteen qualifying places were allocated to the fastest performances at the 2023 and 2024 World Championships.

== Heats ==
Two heats (preliminary rounds) took place on 27 July 2024, starting at 12:26. (Note: All times are Central European Summer Time (UTC+2)) The teams with the best eight times in the heats advanced to the final. Australia won the first heat to qualify with the fastest time of 3:54.81, while Canada won the second heat to qualify with the second fastest time of 3:56.10. China, the United States, Japan, Sweden, France and the Netherlands also all qualified. Ireland beat their national record, lowering it to 4:00.12, but it was not fast enough to qualify.

Results
Rank	Heat	Lane	Team	Swimmers	Time	Notes
1	1	4	Australia	Iona Anderson (58.67); Ella Ramsay (1:06.79); Alexandria Perkins (56.59); Meg Harris (52.76)	3:54.81	Q
2	2	5	Canada	Ingrid Wilm (59.42); Sophie Angus (1:06.07); Mary-Sophie Harvey (57.68); Penny Oleksiak (52.93)	3:56.10	Q
3	1	5	China	Wang Xue'er (59.75); Tang Qianting (1:05.74); Yu Yiting (56.60); Wu Qingfeng (54.25)	3:56.34	Q
4	2	4	United States	Katharine Berkoff (58.98); Emma Weber (1:07.39); Alex Shackell (57.32); Kate Douglass (52.71)	3:56.40	Q
5	2	6	Japan	Rio Shirai (1:00.91); Satomi Suzuki (1:05.52); Mizuki Hirai (56.32); Rikako Ikee (53.77)	3:56.52	Q
6	2	3	Sweden	Hanna Rosvall (1:00.16); Sophie Hansson (1:07.24); Louise Hansson (56.62); Sarah Sjöström (53.31)	3:57.33	Q
7	1	6	France	Emma Terebo (59.16); Charlotte Bonnet (1:07.40); Marie Wattel (57.19); Mary-Ambre Moluh (53.65)	3:57.40	Q
8	1	3	Netherlands	Maaike de Waard (1:00.19); Tes Schouten (1:07.88); Tessa Giele (57.01); Marrit Steenbergen (52.40)	3:57.48	Q
9	1	7	Germany	Laura Riedemann (1:01.05); Anna Elendt (1:05.92); Angelina Köhler (56.74); Nina Holt (54.41)	3:58.12	
10	2	2	Great Britain	Kathleen Dawson (1:00.67); Angharad Evans (1:05.40); Keanna Macinnes (58.72); Freya Anderson (53.55)	3:58.34	
11	2	1	Ireland	Danielle Hill (1:00.84); Mona McSharry (1:05.38); Ellen Walshe (58.01); Grace Davison (55.89)	4:00.12	NR
12	1	2	Poland	Adela Piskorska (1:00.96); Dominika Sztandera (1:07.39); Paulina Peda (58.66); Kornelia Fiedkiewicz (53.93)	4:00.94	
13	1	1	Hong Kong	Hoi Shun Stephanie Au (1:01.49); Siobhan Haughey (1:07.01); Cheuk Tung Natalie Kan (59.76); Hoi Lam Tam (55.30)	4:03.56	
14	2	8	Singapore	Levenia Sim (1:02.30); Letitia Sim (1:06.76); Quah Jing Wen (59.94); Gan Ching Hwee (56.58)	4:05.58	
	1	8	Denmark	Schastine Tabor; Thea Blomsterberg; Martine Damborg; Elisabeth Sabroe Ebbesen	DSQ	
	2	7	Italy	Margherita Panziera; Benedetta Pilato; Viola Scotto Di Carlo; Sofia Morini	DSQ	

== Final ==
The final took place at 21:44 on 27 July. As the first swimmer in the relay, the US' Regan Smith swam an Olympic record of 57.28 in the 100 metres backstroke. This swim would have won her gold in the individual 100 metres backstroke event earlier in the meet, but in that event she swam slower to finish second. The US moved further ahead over the rest of the race to win with a new world record of 3:49.63. In what SwimSwam called a "tight battle for silver", Australia finished second with 3:53.11 and China finished third with 3:53.23.

The US' world record broke the previous world record of 3:50.40, which was also set by the US at the 2019 World Championships. France broke their national record with a time of 3:56.29 to finish seventh.

Results
Rank	Lane	Team	Swimmers	Time	Notes
1st place, gold medalist(s)	6	United States	Regan Smith (57.28) OR; Lilly King (1:04.90); Gretchen Walsh (55.03); Torri Huske (52.42)	3:49.63	WR
2nd place, silver medalist(s)	4	Australia	Kaylee McKeown (57.72); Jenna Strauch (1:07.31); Emma McKeon (56.25); Mollie O'Callaghan (51.83)	3:53.11	
3rd place, bronze medalist(s)	3	China	Wan Letian (59.81); Tang Qianting (1:05.79); Zhang Yufei (55.52); Yang Junxuan (52.11)	3:53.23	
4	5	Canada	Kylie Masse (58.29); Sophie Angus (1:06.54); Maggie Mac Neil (55.79); Summer McIntosh (53.29)	3:53.91	
5	2	Japan	Rio Shirai (1:01.24); Satomi Suzuki (1:05.08); Mizuki Hirai (56.27); Rikako Ikee (53.58)	3:56.17	
6	1	France	Emma Terebo (59.00); Charlotte Bonnet (1:06.85); Marie Wattel (57.29); Beryl Gastaldello (53.15)	3:56.29	NR
7	7	Sweden	Hanna Rosvall (1:00.38); Sophie Hansson (1:06.24); Louise Hansson (56.95); Sarah Sjöström (53.35)	3:56.92	
8	8	Netherlands	Maaike de Waard (59.91); Tes Schouten (1:08.55); Tessa Giele (57.51); Marrit Steenbergen (53.55)	3:59.52	
