= Kazybek Nogerbek =

Kazakhstani chess grandmaster (born 2004)

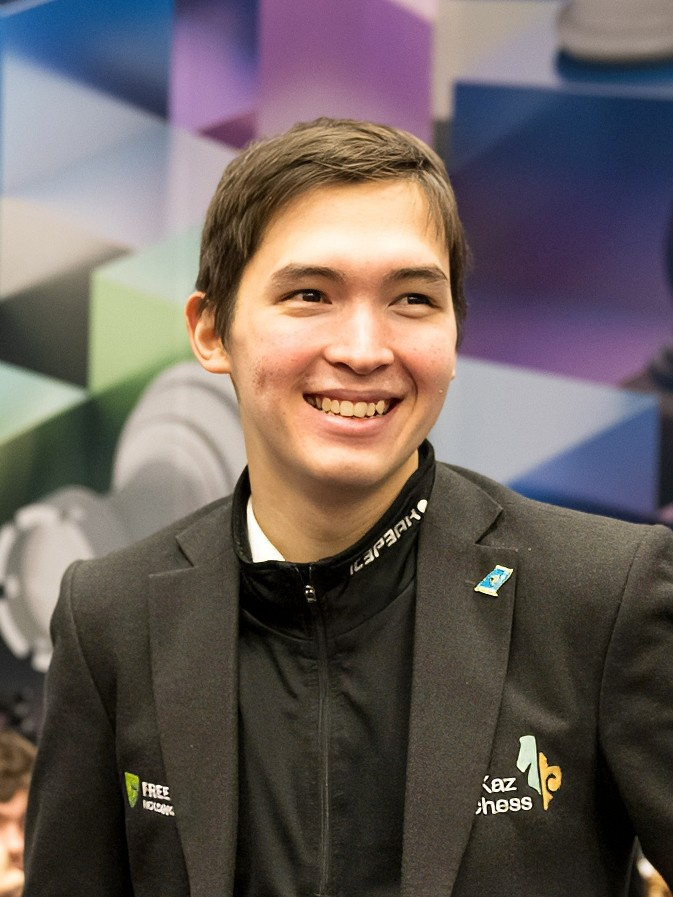
- Nogerbek in 2025

Personal information
- Born: 13 May 2004 (age 22)

Chess career
- Country: Kazakhstan
- Title: Grandmaster (2024)
- FIDE rating: 2494 (July 2026)
- Peak rating: 2544 (April 2025)

Qazybek Amangeldıūly Nögerbek (Note: Often transliterated as Kazybek Amangeldievich Nogerbek through a Russified Romanization of Казыбек Амангельдиевич Ногербек.) (Kazakh: Қазыбек Амангелдіұлы Нөгербек; born 13 May 2004) is a Kazakh chess player who holds the title of Grandmaster (GM). He was the 2024 World Junior Chess Champion.

== Chess career ==
Nogerbek started playing chess at the age of 6. He earned the Candidate Master title at the age of 11 and the FIDE Master title at the age of 13.

At the 44th Chess Olympiad in 2022, Nogerbek played board 5 for Kazakhstan, where he finished on a score of 7.5/10 (+6−1=3) (Note: 6 wins, 1 loss, and 3 draws, including 6 wins against Wu Bing-Shen (1660), Mekhriddin Sharifov (2097), Akram Khoder (2038), Yasser Hadj Kholti (1871), FM Maksims Golubovskis (2219), and IM Vojtech Zwardon (2503), 1 loss against GM Nijat Abasov (2633), and 3 draws against GM Eduardo Iturrizaga Bonelli (2619), GM Marin Bosiocic (2549), and GM Abhimanyu Puranik (2612). The numbers in brackets represent the opponents' elo rating.). This performance earned him an IM norm, however, he had already completed the title with norms at the 2018 World U14 Chess Championship, the 2019 Astana Masters, and the 2022 Aktobe Open. FIDE awarded him the title in August 2022.

Nogerbek earned the GM title in June 2024, with norms at the 2023 Baku Open, the 2024 Festival International des Jeux, and the 2024 Dubai Police Global Challenge for Chess.

In 2024, Nogerbek participated in the World Junior Championship. As the ninth seed in the tournament, he finished tied for first with GM Emin Ohanyan of Armenia, with a score of 8.5/11 (+6−0=5) (Note: 6 wins, 0 losses, and 5 draws, including 6 wins against Vepaly Halynyazov (2058), IM Manish Anto Cristiano F (2307), IM Hamed Wafa (2396), IM Ilamparthi A. R. (2446), IM L M S T De Silva (2364), and GM Mamikon Gharibyan (2492), and 5 draws against IM Chakraborty Mayank (2425), GM Jose Gabriel Cardoso Cardoso (2497), GM Aleksey Grebnev (2540), IM Rudik Makarian (2524), and IM Daniel Quizon. The numbers in brackets represent the opponents' elo rating.), ultimately winning the title on tiebreaks.

His chess coaches are Ukrainian GM Anton Korobov and French GM Vladislav Tkachiev.
