= Wang Xue'er =

Chinese swimmer (born 1998)

Personal information
- National team: China
- Born: 15 January 1998 (age 28) Anqing, Anhui, China
- Height: 1.78 m (5 ft 10 in)

Sport
- Sport: Swimming
- Strokes: Backstroke
Medal record
Women's swimming
Representing China
Olympic Games
Bronze medal – third place	2024 Paris	4x100 m medley
Asian Games
Gold medal – first place	2022 Hangzhou	50 m backstroke
Silver medal – second place	2022 Hangzhou	100 m backstroke
Silver medal – second place	2026 Aichi–Nagoya	50 m backstroke
Bronze medal – third place	2014 Incheon	100 m backstroke

Wang Xue'er (Chinese: 汪雪儿; born 15 January 1998) is a Chinese competitive swimmer who specializes in backstroke. She qualified for the 2016 Summer Olympics in Rio de Janeiro in the 100 meter backstroke. She swam the 14th time in the heats and reached the semifinals where she finished 16th. She won gold and silver medals at the 50 m backstroke and 100 m backstroke at the 19th Asian Games.

== Early life ==
Wang was born in Anqing city in 1998. She started swimming during second grade and in 2009, after winning the Youth Swimming Championships in Anhui, she enrolled for swimming training on the same year at Zhongshan Sports School. She is a graduate of the school of sports science at the South China Normal University.

== Swimming career ==
On 6 September 2013, Wang achieved seventh position in 100 m backstroke at the 12th National Games of China held in Liaoning, China. On September 9, she finished 27th at the 200 m backstroke preliminaries at the same games, missing the finals. On 24 September 2014, she won third place in the 100 m backstroke at the 17th Asian Games in Incheon, South Korea. In December of the same year, her team ranked 10th in the 4 × 100 m medley relay at the 2014 FINA World Swimming Championships (25 m) in Doha, Qatar, with a time of 3 minutes 57.06 seconds and missed the finals.

In August 2015, Wang attained fourth position in the 50 m backstroke and fifth in the 100 m backstroke at the 2016 FINA Swimming World Cup in Paris-Chartres, France. In October of the same year, as part of Guangzhou team, she won the 100 m backstroke at the VIII China National Youth Games in Fujian and her team won the 4 × 100 m medley relay with a time of 4 minutes 06.59 seconds at the same event. She represented China at the 2016 Summer Olympics in Rio de Janeiro, Brazil but was eliminated in the 100m backstroke semi-final. Later in 2016, she won second positions in both the 50m and 100m backstroke at the Asian Swimming Championships in Tokyo, Japan in November.

In 2017, she finished sixth position with a time of 27.55 seconds in the 50 m backstroke at the 17th FINA World Championships in Budapest, Hungary in July. On 31 August of the same year, at the 13th National Games in Henan, China, representing Guangdong, she won second place in the women's 100 m backstroke final with a time of 1:00.25. At the same event, Wang and her team won third place in the 4 × 100 m mixed medley relay and while part of joint team representing Liaoning, Shanghai, Henan and Guangdong at the women's 4 × 100 m medley relay, Wang's team won second place with a time of 4 minutes 23 seconds.

In September 2021, at the 14th National Games in Shaanxi, Wang and the Guangdong team won the third place in the 4 × 200 m medley relay and in the 100 m backstroke final, she finished fourth place. At the same event, the Guangdong team won third place with a time of 3 minutes 47 seconds at the mixed 4 × 100 m medley relay and in the women's 4 × 100 m medley relay, the Guangdong team won fourth position. In March 2023, at the 2023 National Spring Swimming Championships in Qingdao, China, Wang won gold medals in the 100 m backstroke final, 4 × 100 m mixed medley relay final and 4 × 100 m women's medley relay. In September, at the 19th Asian Games in Hangzhou, China, she won first place in the 50m backstroke and second in the 100m backstroke. However, at the 4 × 100 m medley relay preliminaries, the Chinese team was disqualified following Wang's false start.

In March 2024, at the 2024 National Spring Swimming Championships in Qingdao, China, Wang won first place at 100 m backstroke championship. In April 2024, at the National Swimming Championships in Shenzhen, China, Wang won second place in the 100 m backstroke final. In the same event, she also won second place in the mixed 4 × 100 m medley relay and women's 4 × 100 m medley relay finals. As a result of her performance at the 2024 National Swimming Championships, she was selected as part of the Chinese national team for the 2024 Summer Olympics in Paris, France.

A 2024 article recently published in The New York Times alleges that Wang was one of 23 Chinese swimmers who tested positive for trimetazidine (TMZ) in their blood stream although she was one of the four swimmers who did not participate in the 2020 Summer Olympics in Tokyo, Japan but will be in the 2024 Summer Olympics. During a press release, the World Anti-Doping Agency said that the levels of TMZ found in Chinese swimmers were not capable of producing any enhancement in performance at the concentrations found and were due to an environmental contamination. On 29 July 2024, at the semifinals of 100 m backstroke in the 2024 Summer Olympics, Wang finished sixth position in 59.89 seconds and did not advance to the finals. At the 2024 Olympics 4 × 100m medley relay on August 4, the Chinese team consisting of Wang won the bronze medal.
