= Sumiyaagiin Bilgüün =

Mongolian chess grandmaster (born 1997)

Personal information
- Born: 25 March 1997 (age 29) Ulaanbaatar, Mongolia

Chess career
- Country: Mongolia
- Title: Grandmaster (2020)
- FIDE rating: 2407 (November 2026)
- Peak rating: 2497 (November 2018)

Sumiyaagiin Bilgüün (Mongolian: Сумьяагийн Билгүүн; born 25 March 1997) is a Mongolian chess grandmaster. He is the fifth Chess Grandmaster from Mongolia. He earned FIDE Master in 2011 and International Master in 2016. He became Chess Grandmaster in 2020.

== Notable tournaments ==
Tournament Name	Year	ELO	Points
ch-MGL 2017(Dadal MGL)	2017	2444	7.5
