= Chiu Yu-hung =

Taiwanese footballer (born 1994)

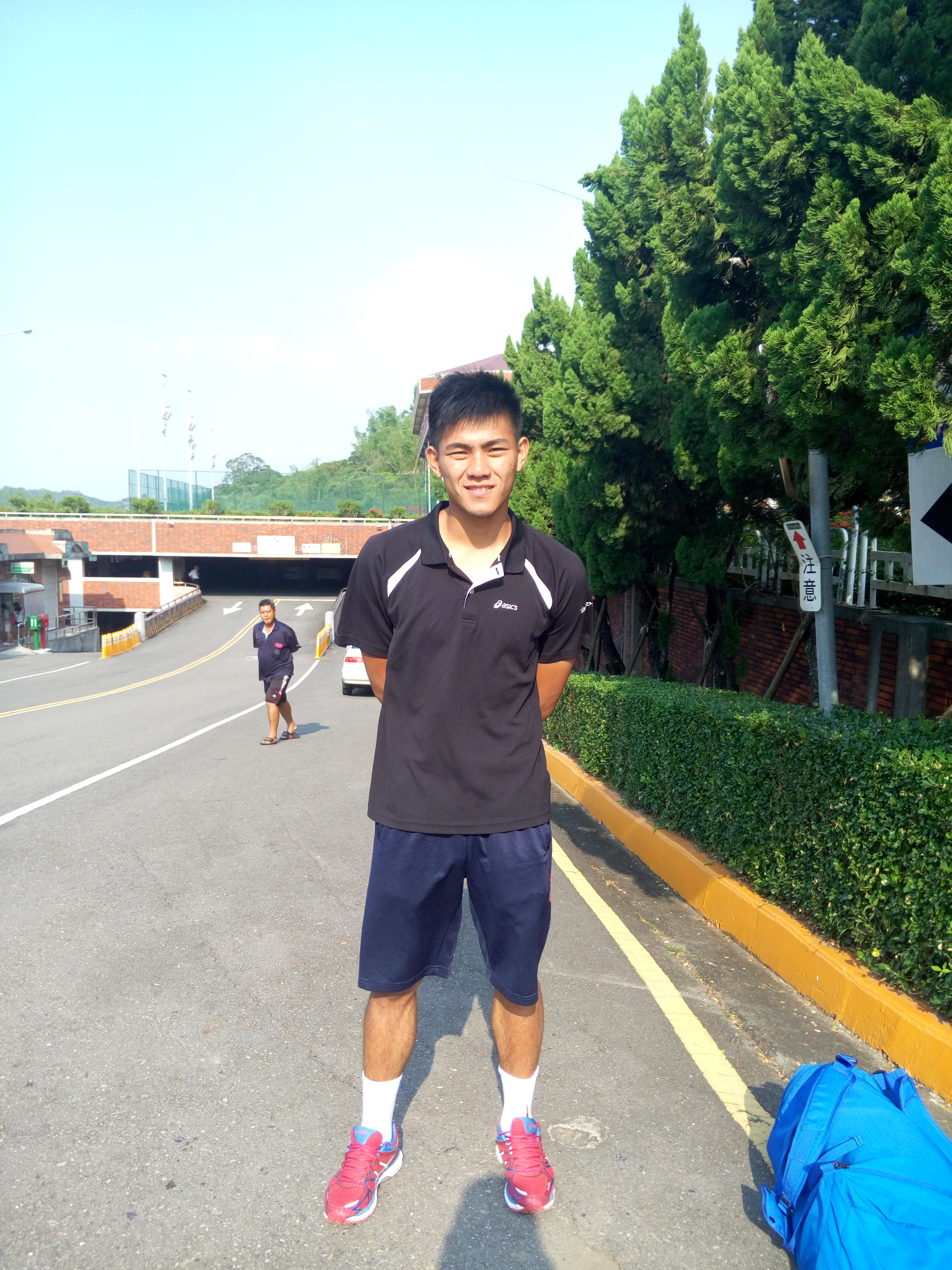
- Yu-hung in 2015

Personal information
- Date of birth: August 31, 1994 (age 32)
- Place of birth: Taipei, Taiwan
- Height: 1.80 m (5 ft 11 in)
- Position: Goalkeeper

Team information
- Current team: Taiwan Power Company

Youth career
- Taipei Physical Education College

Senior career*
Years	Team	Apps	(Gls)
2013–	Taiwan Power Company		

International career^{‡}
2015–	Chinese Taipei	20	(0)
- * Club domestic league appearances and goals ‡ National team caps and goals as of 19 November 2019

Chiu Yu-hung (Chinese: 邱育宏; born 31 August 1994) is a Taiwanese footballer who currently plays as a goalkeeper for the national and club level.
