= Wan Letian =

Chinese swimmer

Personal information
- Nationality: Chinese
- Born: 12 August 2004 (age 22) Nanchang, China

Sport
- Sport: Swimming
Medal record
Women's swimming
Representing China
Olympic Games
Bronze medal – third place	2024 Paris	4×100 m medley
World Championships (LC)
Bronze medal – third place	2025 Singapore	50 m backstroke
Bronze medal – third place	2025 Singapore	4×100 m medley
World Championships (SC)
Bronze medal – third place	2021 Abu Dhabi	4×100 m medley
Asian Games
Gold medal – first place	2022 Hangzhou	100 m backstroke
Gold medal – first place	2026 Aichi–Nagoya	50 m backstroke
Silver medal – second place	2022 Hangzhou	50 m backstroke
Pan Pacific Championships
Bronze medal – third place	2026 Irvine	4×100 m medley

Wan Letian (simplified Chinese: 万乐天; traditional Chinese: 萬樂天; pinyin: Wàn Lètiān; born 12 August 2004) is a Chinese swimmer. She competed in the women's 4 × 100 metre medley relay at the 2024 Summer Olympics, where she won a bronze medal. At the 2026 Asian Games, she took gold in the 50 metre backstroke in 27.47 seconds.
