= Prin Laohawirapap =

Thai chess player (born 2006)

- Prin in 2026

Personal information
- Born: 10 August 2006 (age 20)
- Education: Chulalongkorn University

Chess career
- Country: Thailand
- Title: International Master (2023)
- Peak rating: 2423 (September 2025)

Thai name
- Thai: ปริญญ์ เลาหวิรภาพ
- RTGS: Prin Laohawiraphap
- IPA: [prīn lāw.hà.wí.rá.pʰâːp]

Prin Laohawirapap (born 10 August 2006) is a Thai chess player. He is the highest-rated Thai player and Thailand's only international master.

== Chess career ==
Erigaisi vs. Laohawirapap
16 September 2026

Position: e1 black queen, e2 black rook, h3 white king, f3 white rook, b3 white pawn, h4 white pawn, g5 white queen, e5 white pawn, f6 white pawn, e6 black pawn, a6 black pawn, f7 black pawn, c7 black king

In this position, Erigaisi committed a decisive blunder with 50.Qg7??. (50.Qf4 was the only move that held the position equal.) This allowed Prin to continue with 50...Qh1+ 51.Kg4 Re4+ 52.Rf4 Qd1+ and catch Erigaisi's king in a mating net with the queen and the rook. Erigaisi resigned after 54 moves.

Prin was coached by Deniel Causo and Avetik Grigoryan.

In October 2021, Prin played for the Thai team (Double Bishop Bangkok Chess Club) in the 2021 PCAP San Miguel Corporation-Ayala Land chess championships.

Prin was a joint winner of the U18 Eastern Asian Youth Chess Championship 2022. He became a FIDE master and obtained his first IM norm through the victory.

In June 2023, Prin defeated IM Dao Minh Nhat in the third round of the Open U20 section of the 21st ASEAN Chess Championship. He was able to co-lead until the sixth round, where he drew against Ngo Duc Tri.

Prin played in the Chess World Cup 2023, where he was defeated by Rasmus Svane in the first round. He was awarded the title of International Master later in 2023.

On 16 September 2026, in the first round of the 46th Chess Olympiad, Prin defeated the Indian grandmaster Arjun Erigaisi, who was ranked 9th in the world at the time.

== Personal life ==
Prin was born on 10 August 2006. He studies engineering at Chulalongkorn University.
