= Novendra Priasmoro =

Indonesian chess grandmaster (born 1999)

Personal information
- Born: November 24, 1999 (age 26) Jakarta, Indonesia

Chess career
- Country: Indonesia
- Title: Grandmaster (2020)
- FIDE rating: 2411 (July 2026)
- Peak rating: 2521 (February 2023)

Novendra Priasmoro is an Indonesian chess grandmaster. He won the 2017 Indonesian Chess Championship.

== Chess career ==
In June 2017, he won the Eastern Asia Junior Championship. With this, he earned the IM title and a GM norm.

In April 2018, he won the Bangkok Chess Club Open despite being a relatively unknown 2400-rated player and the field having strong grandmasters, including Nigel Short, Hrant Melkumyan, and Jan Gustafsson.

In March 2020, he fulfilled all of the Grandmaster requirements after defeating Akash G. at the Liberec Open, a tournament that he also won. This made him Indonesia's eighth grandmaster.

In October 2022, he won the Dato Arthur Tan Malaysian Open Chess Championship with a score of 7.5/9, ahead of runner-up J. Deepan Chakkravarthy.

In July 2023, he won the 8th Johor International Open Masters with an undefeated score of 7/9. He finished a full point ahead of runners-up Diptayan Ghosh and Siddharth Jagadeesh.
