= Mohammad Fahad Rahman =

Bangladeshi chess player

Personal information
- Born: 4 July 2003 (age 23) Faridpur, Bangladesh

Chess career
- Country: Bangladesh
- Title: International Master (2019)
- FIDE rating: 2440 (October 2026)
- Peak rating: 2440 (October 2026)

Mohammad Fahad Rahman (born 4 July 2003) is a Bangladeshi chess player.

== Career ==
Rahman qualified for the Chess World Cup 2019, where he was defeated by second seed Anish Giri in the first round. He was due to be coached by Igor Rausis during the tournament, but Rausis was caught cheating in the Strasbourg Open, and the Bangladesh Chess Federation cut ties with Rausis.

On 31 March 2024, Rahman won the first Grandmaster (GM) norm.
