= Nguyễn Ngọc Trường Sơn =

Vietnamese chess grandmaster (born 1990)

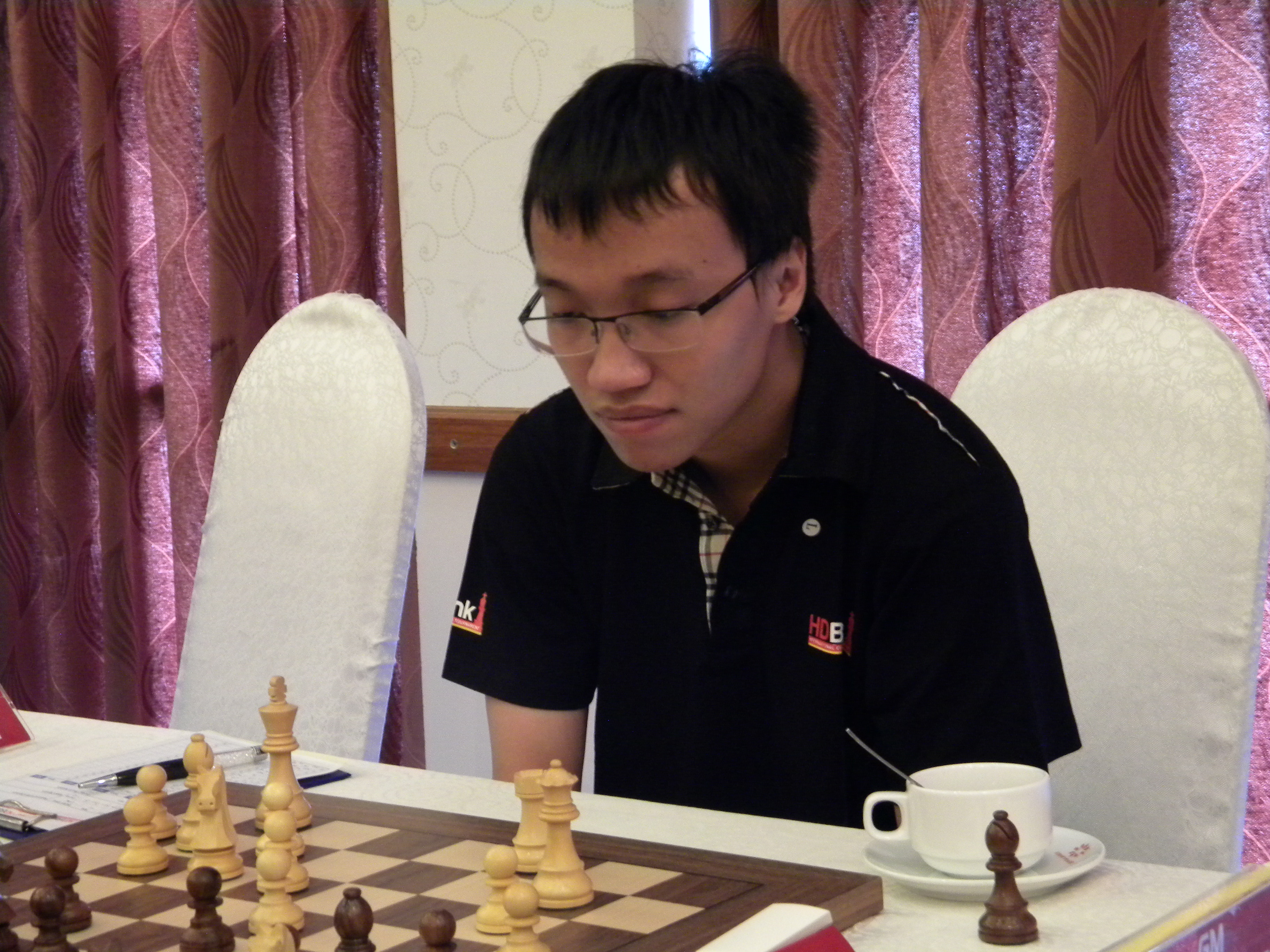
- Trường Sơn in 2016

Personal information
- Born: 23 February 1990 (age 36) Rach Soi, Rach Gia, Kien Giang Province, Vietnam
- Spouse: Phạm Lê Thảo Nguyên (m. 2015)

Chess career
- Country: Vietnam
- Title: Grandmaster (2005)
- FIDE rating: 2600 (July 2026)
- Peak rating: 2665 (November 2011)
- Peak ranking: No. 77 (June 2015)

Nguyễn Ngọc Trường Sơn (born 23 February 1990) is a Vietnamese chess player. The second-best player in Vietnam, he is the youngest Vietnamese ever to become a Grandmaster, and one of the youngest grandmasters in the history of the game, having qualified for the title at the age of fourteen.

== Chess career ==
Trường Sơn learned to play chess at the age of 3. He won a gold medal at the World Youth Championships in the Under 10 category in 2000. He was honored as the Vietnamese "athlete of the year" in 2004. In 2006, Trường Sơn won the Asian Junior (under 20) Championship in New Delhi, on tiebreak over Shyam Sundar M. after they both finished on 7/9 points.

In August 2014, he, Lê Quang Liêm, and other Vietnamese chess players participated in 2014 Chess Olympiad in Tromsø, Norway. With +7=3-0 result, Nguyen Ngoc Truong Son won the gold medal on Board Two thanks to his rating performance of 2843.

He repeated this feat at the 2018 Chess Olympiad in Batumi, Georgia. Playing board 2, he again won the gold medal with an identical score of +7=3-0 for 8.5/10 and an Elo rating performance of 2804. He won bronze in the Chess.com competition at the 2023 Olympic Esports Week.

== Personal life ==
In April 2015, he married compatriot International Master Phạm Lê Thảo Nguyên.
