= Susal Thewjan de Silva =

Sri Lankan chess player (born 2006)

Personal information
- Born: 8 June 2006 (age 20)

Chess career
- Country: Sri Lanka
- Title: International Master (2022)
- Peak rating: 2522 (November 2022)

Lokumannage Susal Thewjan De Silva (born 8 June 2006) is a Sri Lankan chess International Master (2022), three times Sri Lankan Chess Championship winner (2021, 2022, 2023).

== Chess career ==
Sri Lankan chess prodigy Susal Thewjan de Silva of Nalanda College is the second runner-up in the Sri Lanka National Chess Championship 2020. In Anuradhapura, where he attended Primary School before being selected for Nalanda after passing the scholarship exam in Grade 5, Susal won the West Asian Chess Championship (U12 age group) in 2017 to be crowned the youngest FIDE Master when he was just 11 years old. In 2021 he made history when he became the youngest player to be selected for the national team at the age of 13. In 2020, de Silva won bronze medal in Sri Lankan Chess Championship. Then he won that championship the next three years: 2021, 2022, and 2023.

In 2023 de Silva won the silver medal in the Western Asian Youth Chess Championship in the U18 open group.

In 2023, in Baku de Silva participated in single-elimination Chess World Cup and won in 1st round to Canadian Grandmaster Eric Hansen after his withdraw but in 2nd round lost to Polish Grandmaster Radosław Wojtaszek.

de Silva played for Sri Lanka in the Chess Olympiads:

- In 2022, at fourth board in the 44th Chess Olympiad in Chennai (+8, =3, -0).

In 2022, he was awarded the FIDE International Master (IM) title.

3 Times National Champion
