= Sugaryn Gan-Erdene =

Mongolian chess player (born 2003)

Personal information
- Born: March 12, 2003 (age 23)

Chess career
- Country: Mongolia
- Title: International Master (2019)
- FIDE rating: 2474 (July 2026)
- Peak rating: 2472 (May 2026)

Sugaryn Gan-Erdene (Mongolian: Сугарын Ган-Эрдэнэ; born 12 March 2003), is a Mongolian chess player. He is an International master since 2019. He is ranked 8th player and best U18 player in Mongolia. He is ranked 16th U18 player in Asia.

== Career ==
Gan-Erdene played in the U-10 section of the 2013 World Youth Chess Championship, finishing on 7.5 points out of 11.

He played in the Chess World Cup 2019, where he was defeated by Ian Nepomniachtchi in the first round.
