= Raymond Song =

Taiwanese chess grandmaster (born 1994)

Personal information
- Born: 11 January 1994 (age 32) Wellington, New Zealand
- Spouse: Lei Tingjie (m. 2025)

Chess career
- Country: Australia (until 2016); Chinese Taipei (since 2016)
- Title: Grandmaster (2023)
- FIDE rating: 2498 (July 2026)
- Peak rating: 2516 (September 2023)

Raymond Song (Chinese: 宋法昀, born 11 January 1994) is a Taiwanese chess Grandmaster. He is Taiwan's first ever Grandmaster, and the top ranked player nationally.

== Career ==
A former prodigy, he finished equal first at the World Youth Championship Under 10 group in 2004, tying with future Women's World Champion Hou Yifan and top Grandmaster Yu Yangyi. In 2019, he won the Sydney International Open. Two months later, he finished second at the Paracin International Open ahead of 13 grandmasters. In 2022, he shared first place at the Silver Lake Open, but finished second after IM Mohammad Nubairshah Shaikh due to a worse tiebreak score.

Song has played for the Australia Kangaroos in the Pro Chess League, and has represented Qingdao in the Chinese Chess League.

== Personal life ==
He is married to Chinese chess Grandmaster Lei Tingjie.
