= Mikhail Markov =

Kyrgyzstani chess player

Personal information
- Born: 1989 (age 36–37)

Chess career
- Country: Kyrgyzstan
- Title: International Master (2013)
- Peak rating: 2433 (September 2016)

Mikhail Markov is a Kyrgyzstani chess International Master.

== Chess career ==
He played in the Chess World Cup 2013, being defeated by Levon Aronian in the first round.
