= Teia Salvino =

Fil-Am swimmer

Personal information
- Born: 2 November 2005 (age 20)

Sport
- Sport: Swimming
- Strokes: Backstroke, freestyle
Medal record
Representing Philippines
SEA Games
Gold medal – first place	2023 Phnom Penh	100m backstroke
Silver medal – second place	2023 Phnom Penh	4x100m freestyle relay
Silver medal – second place	2023 Phnom Penh	4x100m medley relay
Bronze medal – third place	2023 Phnom Penh	50m backstroke
Bronze medal – third place	2023 Phnom Penh	4x200m freestyle relay

Teia Isabella Salvino is a Filipino–American swimmer who secured a gold medal in the Women's 100m backstroke, becoming the country's second gold medal in swimming at the 32nd Southeast Asian Games.

== Early life and education ==
Salvino father immigrated to the United States from the Philippines. She is currently a high school student at Santa Margarita Catholic High School and swims year-round with the Mission Viejo Nadadores in California.

== Swimming career ==
Salvino started swimming at seven and joined the Paseo Aquatics Club. She broke the Southern California Swimming record in the 11–12 girls age group for the 50-yard freestyle at the Kevin Perry Meet in La Mirada. Clocked in with a time of 23.71, Salvino broke the previous record set by Claire McClean from Westside Aquatics by 0.15 seconds.

=== 2023 SEA Games ===
In May 2023, Salvino won a gold medal in the Women's 100m backstroke at the 2023 SEA Games held at the Morodok Aquatic Centre in Phnom Penh, Cambodia. Her win secured the country's second gold medal in swimming after Xiandi Chua's performance in the 200m backstroke. With a finishing at 1:01:64, Salvino broke the national and SEA Games records in swimming set by Anh Vien since 2017, and reset the national women's 50-meter backstroke record with her 28.95-second swim.

Salvino also won the silver medal in the women's 4×100-meter with fellow SEA Games gold medalist Xiandi Chua, Miranda Renner, and Jasmine Alkhaldi, and a bronze medal in the women's 50m backstroke.

=== World Junior Aquatic Championships ===
Salvino has led the Philippine campaign at the 2023 World Aquatics Junior Swimming Championships in Netanya, Israel. She qualified in the 50m and 100m backstroke, 50m, 100m and 200m freestyle, and 100m butterfly.

== Awards and honors ==
- Santa Margarita All-Time Top 50 Times
- 2021–22 Girls Swimming Honor Roll
- 2024 SwimSwam's Best of the Rest
