= Swimming at the 2024 Summer Olympics – Women's 200-metre butterfly =

Women's 200-metre butterfly at the Games of the XXXIII Olympiad
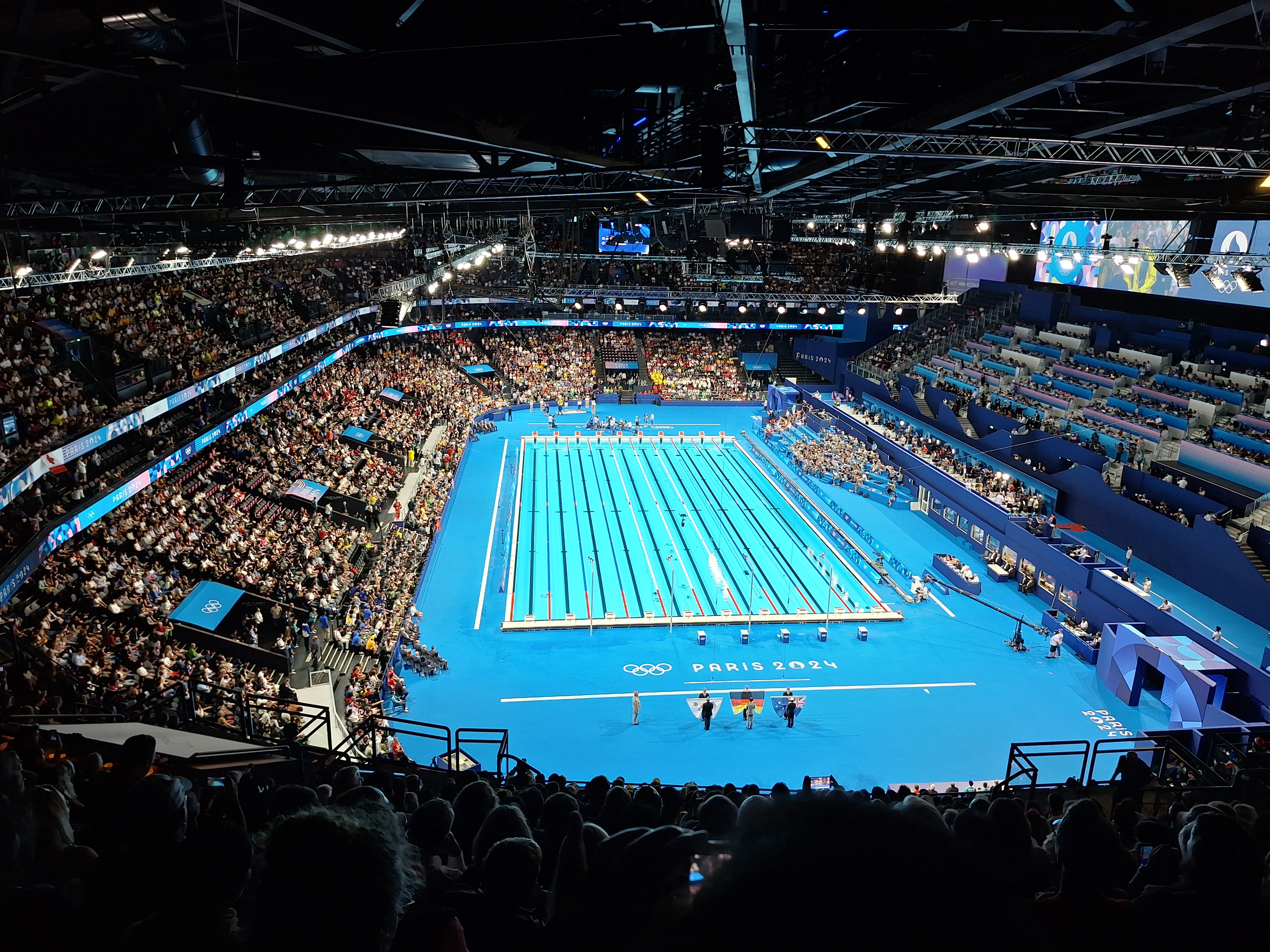
- Paris La Défense Arena after it was converted to a swimming pool for the swimming events
- Venue: Paris La Défense Arena
- Dates: 31 July 2024 (Heats and Semis); 1 August 2024 (Final)
- Competitors: 19 from 14 nations
- Winning time: 2:03.03 OR

Medalists
1st place, gold medalist(s)		Summer McIntosh	Canada
2nd place, silver medalist(s)		Regan Smith	United States
3rd place, bronze medalist(s)		Zhang Yufei	China

The women's 200-metre butterfly event at the 2024 Summer Olympics was held from 31 July to 1 August 2024 at Paris La Défense Arena, which was converted to a swimming pool for the swimming events.

Going into the event, 17 year old Summer McIntosh from Canada was the favourite, with the US' Regan Smith and China's defending Olympic champion Zhang Yufei also contenders for gold. In the heats, Greece's Georgia Damasioti swam 2:09:55 to break the national record, and in the semifinals, Denmark's Helena Rosendahl Bach broke her nation's record with a 2:06.65.

In the final, Zhang took an early lead but was overtaken by McIntosh and Smith in the last 75 metres. McIntosh won gold with a new Olympic and world junior record of 2:03.03, Smith claimed silver with a national record of 2:03.84 and Zhang won the bronze. The medal was McIntosh's second gold of the games, making her the first Canadian swimmer to win multiple Olympic golds.

== Background ==
The defending Olympic champion in the event was Zhang Yufei from China, while 17 year old Summer McIntosh from Canada won the event at the 2022 and 2023 World Championships. Regan Smith of the US was the silver medallist at the previous Olympics, and had since swum the fourth fastest time in history—0.01 seconds slower than Zhang's personal best and two tenths faster than McIntosh's. Twenty year old Elizabeth Dekkers from Australia was the 2023 World Championships silver medallist and was also on a positive improvement trajectory. SwimSwam and Swimming World both ranked McIntosh as the favourite to win.

The event was held at Paris La Défense Arena, which was converted to a swimming pool for the swimming events.

== Qualification ==
Each National Olympic Committee (NOC) was permitted to enter a maximum of two qualified athletes in each individual event, but only if both of them had attained the Olympic Qualifying Time (OQT). For this event, the OQT was 2:08.43 seconds. World Aquatics then considered athletes qualifying through universality; NOCs were given one event entry for each gender, which could be used by any athlete regardless of qualification time, providing the spaces had not already been taken by athletes from that nation who had achieved the OQT. Finally, the rest of the spaces were filled by athletes who had met the Olympic Consideration Time (OCT), which was 2:09.07 for this event. In total, 14 athletes qualified through achieving the OQT, four athletes qualified through universality places and one athlete qualified through achieving the OCT.

Top 10 fastest qualification times
Swimmer	Country	Time	Competition
Summer McIntosh	Canada	02:04:06	2023 World Aquatics Championships
Regan Smith	United States	02:04:80	2024 Pro Swim Series Westmont
Elizabeth Dekkers	Australia	02:05:20	2024 Australian Championships
Zhang Yufei	China	02:05:57	2022 Asian Games
Alex Shackell	United States	02:06:10	2024 United States Olympic Trials
Lana Pudar	Bosnia and Herzegovina	02:06:26	2023 European Junior Championships
Abbey Connor	Australia	02:06:43	2024 Australian Olympic Trials
Airi Mitsui	Japan	02:06:54	2024 Japanese Olympic Trials
Laura Stephens	Great Britain	02:06:62	2023 British Championships
Chen Luying	China	02:06:81	2024 Chinese Championships

== Heats ==
Three heats (preliminary rounds) took place on 31 July 2024, starting at 11:46. (Note: All times are Central European Summer Time (UTC+2)) The swimmers with the best 16 times in the heats advanced to the semifinals. Zhang qualified as the top seed, swimming 2:06:55, while Greece's Georgia Damasioti lowered her own national record from 2023 by 0.19 seconds, swimming 2:09:55.

Results
Rank	Heat	Lane	Swimmer	Nation	Time	Notes
1	3	5	Zhang Yufei	China	2:06.55	Q
2	2	4	Regan Smith	United States	2:06.99	Q
3	3	3	Abbey Connor	Australia	2:07.13	Q
4	2	6	Helena Rosendahl Bach	Denmark	2:07.34	Q
5	2	5	Alex Shackell	United States	2:07.49	Q
6	3	4	Summer McIntosh	Canada	2:07.70	Q
7	1	6	Keanna Macinnes	Great Britain	2:08.46	Q
8	1	4	Elizabeth Dekkers	Australia	2:08.97	Q
9	2	3	Airi Mitsui	Japan	2:09.12	Q
10	2	2	Boglárka Kapás	Hungary	2:09.28	Q
11	3	6	Chen Luying	China	2:09.31	Q
12	1	5	Lana Pudar	Bosnia and Herzegovina	2:09.32	Q
13	3	7	Georgia Damasioti	Greece	2:09.55	Q, NR
14	1	3	Laura Stephens	Great Britain	2:10.46	Q
15	3	2	Hiroko Makino	Japan	2:10.79	Q
16	1	2	Laura Cabanes	Spain	2:10.82	Q
17	2	7	Anja Crevar	Serbia	2:18.46	
18	1	7	Alondra Ortiz	Costa Rica	2:18.56	
19	3	1	Lia Lima	Angola	2:22.19	

== Semifinals ==
Two semifinals took place on 31 July, starting at 20:45. The swimmers with the best eight times in the semifinals advanced to the final. McIntosh qualified as the top seed with 2:04.87, while Smith qualified second, Zhang qualified third and Dekkers fourth. Also qualifying for the final was the US' Alex Shackell, Denmark's Helena Rosendahl Bach, Australia's Abbey Connor and Great Britain's Laura Stephens. Bach also lowered her Nordic record in the event by 0.28 seconds, swimming 2:06.65.

Results
Rank	Heat	Lane	Swimmer	Nation	Time	Notes
1	1	3	Summer McIntosh	Canada	2:04.87	Q
2	1	4	Regan Smith	United States	2:05.39	Q
3	2	4	Zhang Yufei	China	2:06.09	Q
4	1	6	Elizabeth Dekkers	Australia	2:06.17	Q
5	2	3	Alex Shackell	United States	2:06.46	Q
6	1	5	Helena Rosendahl Bach	Denmark	2:06.65	Q, NR
7	2	5	Abbey Connor	Australia	2:07.10	Q
8	1	1	Laura Stephens	Great Britain	2:07.53	Q
9	2	6	Keanna Macinnes	Great Britain	2:08.04	
10	2	7	Chen Luying	China	2:08.07	
11	2	2	Airi Mitsui	Japan	2:08.71	
12	1	7	Lana Pudar	Bosnia and Herzegovina	2:08.74	
13	2	8	Hiroko Makino	Japan	2:09.16	
14	1	2	Boglárka Kapás	Hungary	2:09.23	
15	2	1	Georgia Damasioti	Greece	2:10.25	
16	1	8	Laura Cabanes	Spain	2:10.60	

=== Final ===
The final took place at 20:30 on 1 August 2024. China's Zhang Yufei started fastest, turning first at 50 metres with a 27.08 second split, 0.3 faster than Canada's Summer McIntosh, who in turn split 0.22 faster than Regan Smith from the US. At 65 metres, Zhang had extended her lead to 0.50, but by 100 m McIntosh had closed to 0.16 seconds. At 115 metres (after the third underwater), McIntosh had overtaken Zhang. Zhang temporarily retook the lead during the middle of the penultimate length, but by the final turn McIntosh had a 0.73 advantage. Over the final 50 metres, McIntosh extended her lead to finish in first with 2:03:03, while Smith overtook Zhang to claim silver with 2:03.84. Zhang finished third in 2:05.09.

McIntosh's 2:03.03 was an Olympic record, world junior record and an Americas record. Her win won her second gold medal and third medal of the games, making her the first Canadian swimmer to win multiple Olympic golds. Smith's 2:03.84 lowered her own national record for the US.

Over the race, McIntosh spent about 19 seconds underwater, while Smith was underwater for about 28 and Zhang for about 29. Smith generally breathed once every other stroke, McIntosh generally twice every three strokes and Zhang on almost every stroke. SwimSwam opined after the race: "the key to McIntosh’s victory and Olympic record was her management of the third and fourth laps: she was the only swimmer to touch and surpass the speeds maintained during the first two laps".

Results
Rank	Lane	Swimmer	Nation	Time	Notes
1st place, gold medalist(s)	4	Summer McIntosh	Canada	2:03.03	OR, WJ, AM
2nd place, silver medalist(s)	5	Regan Smith	United States	2:03.84	NR
3rd place, bronze medalist(s)	3	Zhang Yufei	China	2:05.09	
4	6	Elizabeth Dekkers	Australia	2:07.11	
4	7	Helena Rosendahl Bach	Denmark	2:07.11	
6	2	Alex Shackell	United States	2:07.73	
7	1	Abbey Connor	Australia	2:08.15	
8	8	Laura Stephens	Great Britain	2:08.82	

Statistics
Name	50 metre split	100 metre split	150 metre split	Time	Stroke rate (strokes/min)
Summer McIntosh	00:27.38	00:58.97	01:30.70	2:03.03	51.5
Regan Smith	00:27.60	00:59.36	01:31.50	2:03.84	54.8
Zhang Yufei	00:27.08	00:58.81	01:31.43	2:05.09	52.1
Elizabeth Dekkers	00:28.39	01:00.12	01:32.26	2:07.11	50.7
Helena Rosendahl Bach	00:28.72	01:00.55	01:33.06	2:07.11	52.3
Alex Shackell	00:28.26	00:59.97	01:32.94	2:07.73	51.5
Abbey Connor	00:28.67	01:00.46	01:34.12	2:08.15	48.9
Laura Stephens	00:28.71	01:00.85	01:34.01	2:08.82	49.8
