= Swimming at the 2019 World Aquatics Championships – Women's 100 metre butterfly =

Women's 100 metre butterfly at the 2019 World Aquatics Championships
- Venue: Nambu University Municipal Aquatics Center
- Location: Gwangju, South Korea
- Dates: 21 July (heats and semifinals); 22 July (final)
- Competitors: 52 from 44 nations
- Winning time: 55.83

Medalists
gold medal	Maggie MacNeil	Canada
silver medal	Sarah Sjöström	Sweden
bronze medal	Emma McKeon	Australia

The Women's 100 metre butterfly competition at the 2019 World Championships was held on 21 and 22 July 2019.

== Records ==
Prior to the competition, the existing world and championship records were as follows.

World record	Sarah Sjöström (SWE)	55.48	Rio de Janeiro, Brazil	7 August 2016
Competition record	Sarah Sjöström (SWE)	55.53	Budapest, Hungary	24 July 2017

== Results ==
=== Heats ===
The heats were held on 21 July at 10:45.

Rank	Heat	Lane	Name	Nationality	Time	Notes
1	6	4	Sarah Sjöström	Sweden	56.45	Q
2	4	4	Emma McKeon	Australia	56.90	Q
3	6	5	Maggie MacNeil	Canada	57.10	Q
4	6	3	Elena Di Liddo	Italy	57.18	Q, NR
5	5	4	Kelsi Dahlia	United States	57.22	Q
6	6	7	Marie Wattel	France	57.23	Q
7	4	5	Louise Hansson	Sweden	57.50	Q
8	5	6	Katie McLaughlin	United States	57.67	Q
9	5	2	Anna Ntountounaki	Greece	57.88	Q
9	5	5	Brianna Throssell	Australia	57.88	Q
11	5	7	Angelina Köhler	Germany	57.92	Q
12	4	3	Zhang Yufei	China	58.02	Q
13	5	3	Svetlana Chimrova	Russia	58.10	Q
14	4	2	Rebecca Smith	Canada	58.20	Q
15	6	6	Ilaria Bianchi	Italy	58.26	Q
16	6	8	Hiroko Makino	Japan	58.33	Q
17	4	1	Farida Osman	Egypt	58.43	
18	5	1	Wang Yichun	China	58.51	
19	5	8	Suzuka Hasegawa	Japan	58.71	
20	6	2	Béryl Gastaldello	France	58.83	
21	5	0	Park Ye-rin	South Korea	58.99	
22	3	4	Amina Kajtaz	Bosnia and Herzegovina	59.08	NR
23	4	6	Erin Gallagher	South Africa	59.21	
24	4	7	Alys Thomas	Great Britain	59.25	
25	6	1	Kimberly Buys	Belgium	59.26	
26	6	0	Liliána Szilágyi	Hungary	59.32	
27	5	9	Paulina Nogaj	Poland	59.82	
28	4	8	Emilie Beckmann	Denmark	59.94	
29	4	9	Ana Monteiro	Portugal	1:00.37	
30	3	3	Remedy Rule	Philippines	1:00.42	NR
31	3	7	Aksana Dziamidava	Belarus	1:00.51	
32	3	6	Chan Kin Lok	Hong Kong	1:00.64	
33	3	2	Aleyna Özkan	Turkey	1:00.68	
34	3	8	Krystal Lara	Dominican Republic	1:00.79	
35	3	1	Ellen Walshe	Ireland	1:00.85	
36	3	5	Isabella Páez	Venezuela	1:01.27	
37	4	0	Quah Jing Wen	Singapore	1:01.49	
38	6	9	Miriam Guevara	Mexico	1:01.51	
39	1	5	Alexis Margett	Bolivia	1:02.59	
40	2	3	Emily Muteti	Kenya	1:02.88	
41	3	9	Julimar Ávila	Honduras	1:03.64	
42	3	0	Celina Márquez	El Salvador	1:03.93	
43	2	4	Lia Ana Lima	Angola	1:04.40	
44	1	4	Bisma Khan	Pakistan	1:07.19	
45	1	3	Robyn Lee	Zimbabwe	1:07.63	
46	2	2	Katie Rock	Albania	1:07.85	
47	2	6	Yusra Mardini	FINA Independent Athletes	1:08.79	
48	2	0	Moana Wind	Fiji	1:10.86	
49	2	5	Aniqah Gaffoor	Sri Lanka	1:12.63	
50	2	8	Khuyagbaataryn Enkhzul	Mongolia	1:14.23	
51	2	7	Avice Meya	Uganda	1:19.69	
52	2	1	Lucie Kouadio-Patinier	Ivory Coast	1:26.46	

=== Semifinals ===
The semifinals were held on 21 July at 20:12.

==== Semifinal 1 ====
Rank	Lane	Name	Nationality	Time	Notes
1	3	Marie Wattel	France	57.00	Q
2	4	Emma McKeon	Australia	57.01	Q
3	2	Brianna Throssell	Australia	57.02	Q
4	5	Elena Di Liddo	Italy	57.04	Q, NR
5	6	Katie McLaughlin	United States	57.23	
6	1	Rebecca Smith	Canada	57.59	
7	7	Zhang Yufei	China	57.93	
8	8	Hiroko Makino	Japan	58.49	

==== Semifinal 2 ====
Rank	Lane	Name	Nationality	Time	Notes
1	4	Sarah Sjöström	Sweden	56.29	Q
2	5	Maggie MacNeil	Canada	56.52	Q
3	3	Kelsi Dahlia	United States	57.06	Q
4	6	Louise Hansson	Sweden	57.10	Q
5	1	Svetlana Chimrova	Russia	57.78	
6	8	Ilaria Bianchi	Italy	57.92	
7	7	Angelina Köhler	Germany	57.93	
8	2	Anna Ntountounaki	Greece	57.99	

=== Final ===
The final was held on 22 July at 20:10.

Rank	Lane	Name	Nationality	Time	Notes
1st place, gold medalist(s)	5	Maggie MacNeil	Canada	55.83	AM
2nd place, silver medalist(s)	4	Sarah Sjöström	Sweden	56.22	
3rd place, bronze medalist(s)	6	Emma McKeon	Australia	56.61	
4	7	Elena Di Liddo	Italy	57.07	
5	2	Brianna Throssell	Australia	57.09	
6	1	Kelsi Dahlia	United States	57.11	
7	8	Louise Hansson	Sweden	57.16	
8	3	Marie Wattel	France	57.29	
