= Swimming at the 2017 World Aquatics Championships – Women's 200 metre butterfly =

Women's 200 metre butterfly at the 2017 World Aquatics Championships
- Venue: Danube Arena
- Location: Budapest, Hungary
- Dates: 26 July (heats and semifinals); 27 July (final)
- Competitors: 35 from 27 nations
- Winning time: 2:05.26

Medalists
gold medal	Mireia Belmonte	Spain
silver medal	Franziska Hentke	Germany
bronze medal	Katinka Hosszú	Hungary

The Women's 200 metre butterfly competition at the 2017 World Championships was held on 26 and 27 July 2017.

== Records ==
Prior to the competition, the existing world and championship records were as follows.

World record	Liu Zige (CHN)	2:01.81	Jinan, China	21 October 2009
Competition record	Jessicah Schipper (AUS)	2:03.41	Rome, Italy	30 July 2009

== Results ==
=== Heats ===
The heats were held on 26 July at 10:17.

Rank	Heat	Lane	Name	Nationality	Time	Notes
1	4	6	Katinka Hosszú	Hungary	2:07.25	Q
2	4	3	Zhang Yufei	China	2:07.50	Q
3	4	4	Mireia Belmonte	Spain	2:07.59	Q
4	4	5	Zhou Yilin	China	2:07.72	Q
5	3	3	Liliána Szilágyi	Hungary	2:07.73	Q
6	2	2	An Se-hyeon	South Korea	2:08.06	Q
6	3	4	Franziska Hentke	Germany	2:08.06	Q
8	3	7	Stefania Pirozzi	Italy	2:08.84	Q
8	2	5	Hali Flickinger	United States	2:08.84	Q
10	4	1	Dakota Luther	United States	2:08.86	Q
11	3	5	Brianna Throssell	Australia	2:08.98	Q
12	2	4	Suzuka Hasegawa	Japan	2:09.10	Q
13	2	1	Ilaria Bianchi	Italy	2:09.12	Q, WD
14	4	2	Alys Thomas	Great Britain	2:09.13	Q
15	3	6	Hiroko Makino	Japan	2:09.14	Q
16	4	7	Anja Klinar	Slovenia	2:09.21	Q
17	3	2	Martina van Berkel	Switzerland	2:09.34	Q
18	2	7	Park Su-jin	South Korea	2:09.44	
19	3	1	Joanna Maranhão	Brazil	2:09.77	
20	2	6	Svetlana Chimrova	Russia	2:09.86	
21	2	3	Charlotte Atkinson	Great Britain	2:10.68	
22	3	0	Klaudia Naziębło	Poland	2:11.34	
23	4	9	Barbora Závadová	Czech Republic	2:12.09	NR
24	2	0	María José Mata	Mexico	2:12.82	
25	2	9	Anna Ntountounaki	Greece	2:12.90	
26	4	8	Anastasia Guzhenkova	Russia	2:13.65	
27	3	8	Helena Gasson	New Zealand	2:13.71	
28	3	9	Maj Howardsen	Denmark	2:13.88	
29	2	8	Isabella Paéz	Venezuela	2:14.98	
30	1	4	Azra Avdic	Peru	2:15.09	
31	4	0	Virginia Bardach	Argentina	2:15.15	
32	1	5	Alicia Mancilla	Guatemala	2:20.58	
33	1	3	Damini Gowda	India	2:28.95	
34	1	2	Lara Aklouk	Jordan	2:32.35	
35	1	6	Alania Suttie	Samoa	2:35.11	

=== Semifinals ===
The semifinals were held on 26 July at 18:25.

==== Semifinal 1 ====
Rank	Lane	Name	Nationality	Time	Notes
1	5	Zhou Yilin	China	2:06.63	Q
2	7	Suzuka Hasegawa	Japan	2:07.01	Q
3	4	Zhang Yufei	China	2:07.11	Q
4	3	An Se-hyeon	South Korea	2:07.82	Q
5	6	Hali Flickinger	United States	2:07.89	
6	1	Hiroko Makino	Japan	2:07.95	
7	8	Martina van Berkel	Switzerland	2:08.71	
8	2	Dakota Luther	United States	2:09.55	

==== Semifinal 2 ====
Rank	Lane	Name	Nationality	Time	Notes
1	6	Franziska Hentke	Germany	2:06.29	Q
2	5	Mireia Belmonte	Spain	2:06.71	Q
3	4	Katinka Hosszú	Hungary	2:07.37	Q
4	3	Liliána Szilágyi	Hungary	2:07.67	Q
5	2	Stefania Pirozzi	Italy	2:08.62	
6	1	Alys Thomas	Great Britain	2:08.72	
7	8	Anja Klinar	Slovenia	2:09.31	
8	7	Brianna Throssell	Australia	2:10.58	

=== Final ===
The final was held on 27 July at 18:34.

Rank	Lane	Name	Nationality	Time	Notes
1st place, gold medalist(s)	3	Mireia Belmonte	Spain	2:05.26	
2nd place, silver medalist(s)	4	Franziska Hentke	Germany	2:05.39	
3rd place, bronze medalist(s)	7	Katinka Hosszú	Hungary	2:06.02	
4	8	An Se-hyeon	South Korea	2:06.67	NR
5	2	Zhang Yufei	China	2:07.06	
6	6	Suzuka Hasegawa	Japan	2:07.43	
7	1	Liliána Szilágyi	Hungary	2:07.58	
8	5	Zhou Yilin	China	2:07.67	
