= Swimming at the 2019 World Aquatics Championships – Women's 200 metre butterfly =

Women's 200 metre butterfly at the 2019 World Aquatics Championships
- Venue: Nambu University Municipal Aquatics Center
- Location: Gwangju, South Korea
- Dates: 24 July (heats and semifinals); 25 July (final)
- Competitors: 33 from 28 nations
- Winning time: 2:06.78

Medalists
gold medal	Boglárka Kapás	Hungary
silver medal	Hali Flickinger	United States
bronze medal	Katie Drabot	United States

The Women's 200 metre butterfly competition at the 2019 World Championships was held on 24 and 25 July 2019.

== Records ==
Prior to the competition, the existing world and championship records were as follows.

World record	Liu Zige (CHN)	2:01.81	Jinan, China	21 October 2009
Competition record	Jessicah Schipper (AUS)	2:03.41	Rome, Italy	30 July 2009

== Results ==
=== Heats ===
The heats were held on 24 July at 11:12.

Rank	Heat	Lane	Name	Nationality	Time	Notes
1	3	4	Hali Flickinger	United States	2:05.96	Q
2	3	5	Boglárka Kapás	Hungary	2:07.60	Q
3	3	6	Liliána Szilágyi	Hungary	2:08.16	Q
4	2	3	Svetlana Chimrova	Russia	2:08.26	Q
5	2	4	Katie Drabot	United States	2:08.33	Q
6	2	5	Franziska Hentke	Germany	2:08.69	Q
6	4	4	Alys Thomas	Great Britain	2:08.69	Q
8	2	6	Laura Stephens	Great Britain	2:09.03	Q
9	4	2	Ana Monteiro	Portugal	2:09.43	Q
10	3	3	Hiroko Makino	Japan	2:09.88	Q
11	4	6	Brianna Throssell	Australia	2:09.91	Q, WD
12	3	7	Ilaria Cusinato	Italy	2:10.03	Q
12	4	3	Suzuka Hasegawa	Japan	2:10.03	Q
14	4	0	Laura Lahtinen	Finland	2:10.39	Q, NR
15	3	2	Zhu Jiaming	China	2:10.54	Q
16	4	5	Mireia Belmonte	Spain	2:10.63	Q
17	2	7	Park Su-jin	South Korea	2:10.73	Q
18	4	1	Nida Eliz Üstündağ	Turkey	2:11.09	
19	4	8	Remedy Rule	Philippines	2:11.38	NR
20	3	1	Duné Coetzee	South Africa	2:11.92	
21	2	8	Quah Jing Wen	Singapore	2:12.48	
22	2	1	Lê Thị Mỹ Thảo	Vietnam	2:13.11	
23	3	9	Amina Kajtaz	Bosnia and Herzegovina	2:13.70	
24	2	0	Valentine Dumont	Belgium	2:13.78	
25	4	9	Anna Ntountounaki	Greece	2:13.83	
26	2	2	Zhang Yufei	China	2:14.20	
27	2	9	María Fe Muñoz	Peru	2:15.28	
28	3	8	Barbora Závadová	Czech Republic	2:15.63	
29	3	0	Adinda Kirana	Indonesia	2:20.07	
30	1	4	Lia Ana Lima	Angola	2:22.15	
31	1	5	Katie Rock	Albania	2:28.58	
32	1	6	Junayna Ahmed	Bangladesh	2:34.95	
33	1	3	Zaira Forson	Ghana	2:39.20	NR
	4	7	Ilaria Bianchi	Italy	DNS	

=== Semifinals ===
The semifinals were held on 24 July at 21:10.

==== Semifinal 1 ====
Rank	Lane	Name	Nationality	Time	Notes
1	4	Boglárka Kapás	Hungary	2:07.33	Q
2	3	Franziska Hentke	Germany	2:08.14	Q
3	5	Svetlana Chimrova	Russia	2:08.30	Q
4	6	Laura Stephens	Great Britain	2:09.06	Q
5	7	Suzuka Hasegawa	Japan	2:09.22	
6	2	Hiroko Makino	Japan	2:09.60	
7	8	Park Su-jin	South Korea	2:09.97	
8	1	Zhu Jiaming	China	2:10.52	

==== Semifinal 2 ====
Rank	Lane	Name	Nationality	Time	Notes
1	4	Hali Flickinger	United States	2:06.25	Q
2	3	Katie Drabot	United States	2:06.59	Q
3	5	Liliána Szilágyi	Hungary	2:07.83	Q
4	6	Alys Thomas	Great Britain	2:08.26	Q
5	7	Ilaria Cusinato	Italy	2:09.18	
6	2	Ana Monteiro	Portugal	2:09.72	
7	1	Laura Lahtinen	Finland	2:10.78	
8	8	Mireia Belmonte	Spain	2:12.72	

=== Final ===
The final was held on 25 July at 20:02.

Rank	Lane	Name	Nationality	Time	Notes
1st place, gold medalist(s)	3	Boglárka Kapás	Hungary	2:06.78	
2nd place, silver medalist(s)	4	Hali Flickinger	United States	2:06.95	
3rd place, bronze medalist(s)	5	Katie Drabot	United States	2:07.04	
4	2	Franziska Hentke	Germany	2:07.30	
5	7	Alys Thomas	Great Britain	2:07.48	
6	6	Liliána Szilágyi	Hungary	2:07.68	
7	1	Svetlana Chimrova	Russia	2:08.70	
8	8	Laura Stephens	Great Britain	2:09.35	
