= Swimming at the 2023 World Aquatics Championships – Women's 200 metre butterfly =

Women's 200 metre butterfly at the 2023 World Aquatics Championships
- Venue: Marine Messe Fukuoka
- Location: Fukuoka, Japan
- Dates: 26 July (heats and semifinals); 27 July (final)
- Competitors: 31 from 25 nations
- Winning time: 2:04.06

Medalists
gold medal	Summer McIntosh	Canada
silver medal	Elizabeth Dekkers	Australia
bronze medal	Regan Smith	United States

The women's 200 metre butterfly competition at the 2023 World Aquatics Championships was held on 26 and 27 July 2023.

== Records ==
Prior to the competition, the existing world and championship records were as follows.

World record	Liu Zige (CHN)	2:01.81	Jinan, China	21 October 2009
Competition record	Jessicah Schipper (AUS)	2:03.41	Rome, Italy	30 July 2009

== Results ==
=== Heats ===
The heats were started on 26 July at 11:40.

Rank	Heat	Lane	Name	Nationality	Time	Notes
1	2	3	Helena Rosendahl Bach	Denmark	2:07.57	Q
2	3	4	Elizabeth Dekkers	Australia	2:07.71	Q
3	4	4	Summer McIntosh	Canada	2:07.91	Q
4	3	5	Laura Stephens	Great Britain	2:08.07	Q
5	4	3	Lana Pudar	Bosnia and Herzegovina	2:08.16	Q
6	2	5	Airi Mitsui	Japan	2:08.54	Q
7	4	6	Emily Large	Great Britain	2:08.93	Q
8	3	6	Hiroko Makino	Japan	2:09.03	Q
9	3	3	Lindsay Looney	United States	2:09.27	Q
10	3	2	Yu Liyan	China	2:09.29	Q
11	4	7	María José Mata	Mexico	2:09.50	Q
12	2	6	Abbey Connor	Australia	2:10.04	Q
13	4	2	Boglárka Kapás	Hungary	2:10.18	Q
14	2	2	Zsuzsanna Jakabos	Hungary	2:10.73	Q
15	2	4	Regan Smith	United States	2:10.80	Q
16	3	1	Anja Crevar	Serbia	2:10.98	Q, NR
17	2	7	Georgia Damasioti	Greece	2:11.03	
18	4	1	Park Su-jin	South Korea	2:11.20	
19	3	7	Quah Jing Wen	Singapore	2:11.50	
20	3	8	Kamonchanok Kwanmuang	Thailand	2:12.46	
21	2	8	Amina Kajtaz	Croatia	2:12.57	
22	2	1	Lea Polonsky	Israel	2:12.62	
23	4	0	Karen Durango	Colombia	2:12.86	
24	3	0	Maria Fernanda Costa	Brazil	2:13.30	
25	4	8	Laura Lahtinen	Finland	2:13.65	
26	4	9	Trinity Hearne	South Africa	2:14.78	
27	2	0	Alondra Ortiz	Costa Rica	2:16.95	
28	1	4	Lia Ana Lima	Angola	2:26.95	
29	1	5	Amaya Bollinger	Guam	2:38.22	
30	1	3	Meral Latheef	Maldives	3:05.69	
	4	5	Zhang Yufei	China	Did not start	

=== Semifinals ===
The semifinals were started on 26 July 21:16.

Rank	Heat	Lane	Name	Nationality	Time	Notes
1	2	3	Lana Pudar	Bosnia and Herzegovina	2:06.60	Q
2	2	8	Regan Smith	United States	2:06.83	Q
3	2	5	Summer McIntosh	Canada	2:06.85	Q
4	1	4	Elizabeth Dekkers	Australia	2:07.11	Q
5	2	4	Helena Rosendahl Bach	Denmark	2:07.15	Q, NR
6	1	5	Laura Stephens	Great Britain	2:07.47	Q
7	1	3	Airi Mitsui	Japan	2:07.51	Q
8	2	2	Lindsay Looney	United States	2:07.72	Q
9	1	6	Hiroko Makino	Japan	2:08.40	
10	2	6	Emily Large	Great Britain	2:08.66	
11	1	2	Yu Liyan	China	2:08.78	
12	2	7	María José Mata	Mexico	2:09.33	
13	2	1	Boglárka Kapás	Hungary	2:09.56	
14	1	7	Abbey Connor	Australia	2:10.35	
15	1	1	Zsuzsanna Jakabos	Hungary	2:11.23	
16	1	8	Anja Crevar	Serbia	2:11.65	

=== Final ===
The final was held on 27 July at 20:02.

Rank	Lane	Name	Nationality	Time	Notes
1st place, gold medalist(s)	3	Summer McIntosh	Canada	2:04.06	AM, WJ
2nd place, silver medalist(s)	6	Elizabeth Dekkers	Australia	2:05.46	
3rd place, bronze medalist(s)	5	Regan Smith	United States	2:06.58	
4	4	Lana Pudar	Bosnia and Herzegovina	2:07.05	
5	1	Airi Mitsui	Japan	2:07.15	
5	2	Helena Rosendahl Bach	Denmark	2:07.15	NR
7	7	Laura Stephens	Great Britain	2:07.27	
8	8	Lindsay Looney	United States	2:07.90	
