= 2016 FINA World Swimming Championships (25 m) – Women's 200 metre butterfly =

Women's 200 metre butterfly at the 2016 FINA World Swimming Championships (25 m)
- Venue: WFCU Centre
- Dates: 7 December (heats and final)
- Competitors: 27 from 22 nations
- Winning time: 2:02.15

Medalists
gold medal	Katinka Hosszú	Hungary
silver medal	Kelsi Worrell	United States
bronze medal	Zhang Yufei	China

The Women's 200 metre butterfly competition of the 2016 FINA World Swimming Championships (25 m) was held on 7 December 2016.

== Records ==
Prior to the competition, the existing world and championship records were as follows.

	Name	Nation	Time	Location	Date
World record Championship record	Mireia Belmonte	Spain	1:59.61	Doha	3 December 2014

== Results ==
=== Heats ===
The heats were held at 11:12.

Rank	Heat	Lane	Name	Nationality	Time	Notes
1	2	4	Kelsi Worrell	United States	2:03.94	Q
2	1	5	Zhang Yufei	China	2:05.40	Q
3	3	4	Katinka Hosszú	Hungary	2:05.43	Q
4	1	3	Ella Eastin	United States	2:05.53	Q
5	2	5	Emily Washer	Australia	2:07.36	Q
6	2	2	Katerine Savard	Canada	2:07.54	Q
7	1	4	Svetlana Chimrova	Russia	2:07.87	Q
8	3	3	Miyu Nakano	Japan	2:08.05	Q
9	1	2	Nida Eliz Üstündağ	Turkey	2:08.27	NR
10	3	6	Martina van Berkel	Switzerland	2:08.37	
11	2	3	Audrey Lacroix	Canada	2:08.58	
12	3	7	Zhou Yilin	China	2:08.81	
13	1	6	Laura Stephens	Great Britain	2:08.94	
14	2	1	Ajna Késely	Hungary	2:09.34	
15	2	7	Yai Watanabe	Japan	2:09.67	
16	2	6	Lisa Hopink	Germany	2:09.76	
17	3	1	Barbora Závadová	Czech Republic	2:09.88	NR
18	3	2	Chan Kin Lok	Hong Kong	2:09.99	
19	3	5	Mireia Belmonte	Spain	2:10.21	
20	1	7	Patarawadee Kittiya	Thailand	2:11.35	NR
21	1	1	Victoria Kaminskaya	Portugal	2:12.70	
22	2	8	Beatričė Kanapienytė	Lithuania	2:16.52	NR
23	3	8	Sarah Hadj-Abderrahmane	Algeria	2:18.44	
24	1	8	Tieri Erasito	Fiji	2:24.72	
25	3	0	Alania Suttie	Samoa	2:27.37	NR
26	1	0	Kim Sol-song	North Korea	2:34.78	
27	2	0	Kuan I Cheng	Macau	2:35.88	

=== Final ===
The final was held at 18:44.

Rank	Lane	Name	Nationality	Time	Notes
1st place, gold medalist(s)	3	Katinka Hosszú	Hungary	2:02.15	
2nd place, silver medalist(s)	4	Kelsi Worrell	United States	2:02.89	AM
3rd place, bronze medalist(s)	5	Zhang Yufei	China	2:05.10	
4	6	Ella Eastin	United States	2:05.66	
5	1	Svetlana Chimrova	Russia	2:06.20	NR
6	2	Emily Washer	Australia	2:07.19	
7	7	Katerine Savard	Canada	2:07.49	
8	8	Miyu Nakano	Japan	2:09.42	
