= 2018 FINA World Swimming Championships (25 m) – Women's 200 metre butterfly =

Women's 200 metre butterfly at the 2018 FINA World Swimming Championships (25 m)
- Venue: Hangzhou Sports Park Stadium
- Dates: 12 December (heats and final)
- Competitors: 28 from 25 nations
- Winning time: 2:01.60

Medalists
gold medal	Katinka Hosszú	Hungary
silver medal	Kelsi Dahlia	United States
bronze medal	Suzuka Hasegawa	Japan

The women's 200 metre butterfly competition of the 2018 FINA World Swimming Championships (25 m) was held on 12 December 2018.

== Records ==
Prior to the competition, the existing world and championship records were as follows.

	Name	Nation	Time	Location	Date
World record Championship record	Mireia Belmonte	Spain	1:59.61	Doha	3 December 2014

== Results ==
=== Heats ===
The heats were started on 12 December at 10:54.

Rank	Heat	Lane	Name	Nationality	Time	Notes
1	1	4	Kelsi Dahlia	United States	2:03.51	Q
2	3	4	Katinka Hosszú	Hungary	2:04.68	Q
3	1	3	Lara Grangeon	France	2:05.11	Q
4	1	5	Suzuka Hasegawa	Japan	2:05.19	Q
5	3	3	Nao Kobayashi	Japan	2:05.28	Q
6	2	4	Zhang Yufei	China	2:05.99	Q
7	3	5	Ilaria Bianchi	Italy	2:06.40	Q
8	3	6	Ana Monteiro	Portugal	2:06.49	Q, NR
9	2	5	Svetlana Chimrova	Russia	2:06.57	
10	2	3	Nida Eliz Üstündağ	Turkey	2:07.74	
11	2	2	Catalina Corro	Spain	2:07.98	
12	2	6	Zhang Yuhan	China	2:08.57	
13	1	2	Emilie Lovberg	Norway	2:08.62	
14	3	2	Claudia Hufnagl	Austria	2:10.71	
15	1	6	Chan Kin Lok	Hong Kong	2:11.23	
15	2	7	Isabella Páez	Venezuela	2:11.23	
17	1	7	Barbora Závadová	Czech Republic	2:12.12	
18	3	1	Amina Kajtaz	Bosnia and Herzegovina	2:12.95	
19	3	7	Roza Erdemli	Turkey	2:14.08	
20	1	1	Anna Ntountounaki	Greece	2:14.58	
21	3	8	Nicholle Toh	Singapore	2:15.29	
22	3	0	Alsu Bayramova	Azerbaijan	2:16.16	
23	1	8	Daniela Alfaro	Costa Rica	2:16.70	
24	2	1	Vanessa Ouwehand	New Zealand	2:17.52	
25	3	9	Ri Hye-gyong	North Korea	2:18.63	
26	2	8	Sára Niepelová	Slovakia	2:19.06	
27	2	0	Lara Aklouk	Jordan	2:25.23	
28	1	0	Natalia Kuipers	United States Virgin Islands	2:29.24	

=== Final ===
The final was held on 12 December at 19:14.

Rank	Lane	Name	Nationality	Time	Notes
1st place, gold medalist(s)	5	Katinka Hosszú	Hungary	2:01.60	
2nd place, silver medalist(s)	4	Kelsi Dahlia	United States	2:01.73	AM
3rd place, bronze medalist(s)	6	Suzuka Hasegawa	Japan	2:04.04	
4	3	Lara Grangeon	France	2:04.91	
5	1	Ilaria Bianchi	Italy	2:05.57	
6	8	Ana Monteiro	Portugal	2:05.74	NR
7	7	Zhang Yufei	China	2:05.86	
8	2	Nao Kobayashi	Japan	2:06.24	
