= 2018 Pan Pacific Swimming Championships – Women's 200 metre butterfly =

Women's 200 metre butterfly at the 2018 Pan Pacific Swimming Championships
- Venue: Tokyo Tatsumi International Swimming Center
- Dates: 10 August (heats & finals)
- Competitors: 10 from 5 nations
- Winning time: 2:07.35

Medalists
gold medal	Hali Flickinger	United States
silver medal	Sachi Mochida	Japan
bronze medal	Katie Drabot	United States

The women's 200 metre butterfly competition at the 2018 Pan Pacific Swimming Championships took place on August 10 at the Tokyo Tatsumi International Swimming Center. The defending champion was Cammile Adams of the United States.

== Records ==
Prior to this competition, the existing world and Pan Pacific records were as follows:

World record	Liu Zige (CHN)	2:01.81	Jinan, China	21 October 2009
Pan Pacific Championships record	Jessicah Schipper (AUS)	2:05.40	Victoria, Canada	17 August 2006

== Results ==
All times are in minutes and seconds.

KEY:	QA	Qualified A Final	QB	Qualified B Final	CR	Championships record	NR	National record	PB	Personal best	SB	Seasonal best

=== Heats ===
The first round was held on 10 August from 10:00.

Only two swimmers from each country may advance to the A or B final. If a country not qualify any swimmer to the A final, that same country may qualify up to three swimmers to the B final.

Rank	Name	Nationality	Time	Notes
1	Hali Flickinger	United States	2:07.05	QA
2	Katie Drabot	United States	2:08.40	QA
3	Sachi Mochida	Japan	2:09.47	QA
4	Suzuka Hasegawa	Japan	2:09.73	QA
5	Laura Taylor	Australia	2:09.88	QA
6	Danielle Hanus	Canada	2:11.61	QA
7	Mabel Zavaros	Canada	2:12.97	QA
8	Rosalee Santa Ana	Philippines	2:23.27	QA
9	Gianna Garcia	Philippines	2:46.98	QB
–	Madeline Groves	Australia	DNS	

=== B Final ===
As only one swimmer has advanced the B final was not held.

=== A Final ===
The A final was held on 10 August from 18:00.

Rank	Name	Nationality	Time	Notes
1st place, gold medalist(s)	Hali Flickinger	United States	2:07.35	
2nd place, silver medalist(s)	Sachi Mochida	Japan	2:07.66	
3rd place, bronze medalist(s)	Katie Drabot	United States	2:08.40	
4	Suzuka Hasegawa	Japan	2:08.70	
5	Laura Taylor	Australia	2:09.23	
6	Mabel Zavaros	Canada	2:09.95	
7	Danielle Hanus	Canada	2:11.34	
8	Rosalee Santa Ana	Philippines	2:22.69	
