= Swimming at the 2020 Summer Olympics =

Swimming at the Games of the XXXII Olympiad
- Pictogram for Swimming
- Venue: Tokyo Aquatics Centre
- Dates: 24 July – 1 August 2021
- No. of events: 35
- Competitors: 1000

The swimming competitions at the 2020 Summer Olympics in Tokyo were due to take place from 25 July to 6 August 2020 at the Olympic Aquatics Centre. Due to the COVID-19 pandemic, the games were postponed to 2021. However, their official name remained 2020 Summer Olympics with swimming events set for 24 July–1 August 2021

Swimming featured a record total of 35 events (17 for each gender and 1 mixed), with the addition of the men's 800 m freestyle, women's 1500 m freestyle, and the mixed 4 × 100 m medley relay.

== Events ==
Swimming at the 2020 Olympics featured a total of 35 events (17 each for men and women and 1 mixed event). This was a slight increase from the 32 events contested in the previous Olympic Games. The following events were contested (all pool events are long course, and distances are in metres unless stated):

- Freestyle: 50, 100, 200, 400, 800, and 1500;
- Backstroke: 100 and 200;
- Breaststroke: 100 and 200;
- Butterfly: 100 and 200;
- Individual medley: 200 and 400;
- Relays: 4 × 100 free, 4 × 200 free; 4 × 100 medley (men's, women's, and mixed)

=== Schedule ===
Unlike the previous Olympics, swimming program schedule occurred in two segments. Similar to the case of the 2008 Games, prelims were held in the evening with semifinals and final in the following morning session, spanning a day between semifinals and finals in those events with semifinals. The shift of the normal morning prelims and evening finals (to evening prelims and morning finals) occurred for these Games due to the prior request made by US broadcaster NBC (due to the substantial fees NBC has paid for rights to the Olympics, the IOC has allowed NBC to have influence on event scheduling to maximize U.S. television ratings when possible; NBC agreed to a $7.75 billion contract extension on May 7, 2014, to air the Olympics through the 2032 games and is also one of the major sources of revenue for the IOC), so that the finals from the event could be shown live in the United States.

Legend
H	Heats	½	Semi-finals	F	Final

M = Morning session, starting at 10:30 local time (01:30 UTC).
E = Evening session, starting at 19:00 local time (10:00 UTC).

Men
Date →	Jul 24		Jul 25		Jul 26		Jul 27		Jul 28		Jul 29		Jul 30		Jul 31		Aug 1	
Event ↓	M	E	M	E	M	E	M	E	M	E	M	E	M	E	M	E	M	E
50 m freestyle														H	½		F	
100 m freestyle								H	½		F							
200 m freestyle				H	½		F											
400 m freestyle		H	F															
800 m freestyle								H			F							
1500 m freestyle														H			F	
100 m backstroke				H	½		F											
200 m backstroke										H	½		F					
100 m breaststroke		H	½		F													
200 m breaststroke								H	½		F							
100 m butterfly												H	½		F			
200 m butterfly						H	½		F									
200 m individual medley										H	½		F					
400 m individual medley		H	F															
4 × 100 m freestyle relay				H	F													
4 × 200 m freestyle relay								H	F									
4 × 100 m medley relay														H			F	

Women
Date →	Jul 24		Jul 25		Jul 26		Jul 27		Jul 28		Jul 29		Jul 30		Jul 31		Aug 1	
Event ↓	M	E	M	E	M	E	M	E	M	E	M	E	M	E	M	E	M	E
50 m freestyle														H	½		F	
100 m freestyle										H	½		F					
200 m freestyle						H	½		F									
400 m freestyle				H	F													
800 m freestyle												H			F			
1500 m freestyle						H			F									
100 m backstroke				H	½		F											
200 m backstroke												H	½		F			
100 m breaststroke				H	½		F											
200 m breaststroke										H	½		F					
100 m butterfly		H	½		F													
200 m butterfly								H	½		F							
200 m individual medley						H	½		F									
400 m individual medley		H	F															
4 × 100 m freestyle relay		H	F															
4 × 200 m freestyle relay										H	F							
4 × 100 m medley relay														H			F	

Mixed
Date →	Jul 24		Jul 25		Jul 26		Jul 27		Jul 28		Jul 29		Jul 30		Jul 31		Aug 1	
Event ↓	M	E	M	E	M	E	M	E	M	E	M	E	M	E	M	E	M	E
4 × 100 m medley relay												H			F			

== Qualification ==
=== Individual events ===
FINA establishes qualifying times for individual events. The time standards consisted of two types: an "Olympic Qualifying Time" (OQT) and an "Olympic Selection time" (OST). Each country was able to enter up to two swimmers per event, provided both swimmers met the (faster) qualifying time. A country was able to enter one swimmer per event that met the invitation standard. Any swimmer who met the "qualifying" time was entered in the event for the Games; a swimmer meeting the "invitation" standard was eligible for entry, and their entry was allotted/filled in by ranking. If a country has no swimmers who meet either of the qualifying standards, it may have entered one male and one female. A country that did not receive an allocation spot but had at least one swimmer who met a qualifying standard might have entered the swimmer with the highest ranking.

=== Relay events ===
Each relay event features 16 teams, composed of:

- 12 teams including the top-12 finishers at the 2019 World Championships in each relay event.
- 4 teams including the 4 fastest non-qualified teams, based on times in the 15-months preceding the Olympics.

== Medal summary ==
=== Medal table ===
* Host nation (Japan)

Rank	NOC	Gold	Silver	Bronze	Total
1	United States	11	10	9	30
2	Australia	9	3	8	20
3	Great Britain	4	3	1	8
4	China	3	2	1	6
5	ROC	2	2	1	5
6	Japan*	2	1	0	3
7	Canada	1	3	2	6
8	Hungary	1	1	0	2
8	South Africa	1	1	0	2
10	Tunisia	1	0	0	1
11	Italy	0	2	4	6
12	Hong Kong	0	2	0	2
12	Netherlands	0	2	0	2
14	Ukraine	0	1	1	2
15	France	0	1	0	1
15	Sweden	0	1	0	1
17	Brazil	0	0	2	2
17	Germany	0	0	2	2
17	Switzerland	0	0	2	2
20	Denmark	0	0	1	1
20	Finland	0	0	1	1
Totals (21 entries)		35	35	35	105

=== Men's events ===
Games	Gold		Silver		Bronze	
50 m freestyle	Caeleb Dressel; United States	21.07 OR	Florent Manaudou; France	21.55	Bruno Fratus; Brazil	21.57
100 m freestyle	Caeleb Dressel; United States	47.02 OR	Kyle Chalmers; Australia	47.08	Kliment Kolesnikov; ROC	47.44
200 m freestyle	Thomas Dean; Great Britain	1:44.22 NR	Duncan Scott; Great Britain	1:44.26	Fernando Scheffer; Brazil	1:44.66 SA
400 m freestyle	Ahmed Hafnaoui; Tunisia	3:43.36	Jack McLoughlin; Australia	3:43.52	Kieran Smith; United States	3:43.94
800 m freestyle	Bobby Finke; United States	7:41.87 NR	Gregorio Paltrinieri; Italy	7:42.11	Mykhailo Romanchuk; Ukraine	7:42.33
1500 m freestyle	Bobby Finke; United States	14:39.65	Mykhailo Romanchuk; Ukraine	14:40.66	Florian Wellbrock; Germany	14:40.91
100 m backstroke	Evgeny Rylov; ROC	51.98 ER	Kliment Kolesnikov; ROC	52.00	Ryan Murphy; United States	52.19
200 m backstroke	Evgeny Rylov; ROC	1:53.27 OR	Ryan Murphy; United States	1:54.15	Luke Greenbank; Great Britain	1:54.72
100 m breaststroke	Adam Peaty; Great Britain	57.37	Arno Kamminga; Netherlands	58.00	Nicolò Martinenghi; Italy	58.33
200 m breaststroke	Zac Stubblety-Cook; Australia	2:06.38 OR	Arno Kamminga; Netherlands	2:07.01	Matti Mattsson; Finland	2:07.13 NR
100 m butterfly	Caeleb Dressel; United States	49.45 WR	Kristóf Milák; Hungary	49.68 ER	Noè Ponti; Switzerland	50.74 NR
200 m butterfly	Kristóf Milák; Hungary	1:51.25 OR	Tomoru Honda; Japan	1:53.73	Federico Burdisso; Italy	1:54.45
200 m individual medley	Wang Shun; China	1:55.00 AS	Duncan Scott; Great Britain	1:55.28 NR	Jérémy Desplanches; Switzerland	1:56.17 NR
400 m individual medley	Chase Kalisz; United States	4:09.42	Jay Litherland; United States	4:10.28	Brendon Smith; Australia	4:10.38
4 × 100 m freestyle relay	United States; Caeleb Dressel (47.26); Blake Pieroni (47.58); Bowe Becker (47.44); Zach Apple (46.69); Brooks Curry^{[a]}	3:08.97	Italy; Alessandro Miressi (47.72); Thomas Ceccon (47.45); Lorenzo Zazzeri (47.31); Manuel Frigo (47.63); Santo Condorelli^{[a]}	3:10.11 NR	Australia; Matthew Temple (48.07); Zac Incerti (47.55); Alexander Graham (48.16); Kyle Chalmers (46.44); Cameron McEvoy^{[a]}	3:10.22
4 × 200 m freestyle relay	Great Britain; Thomas Dean (1:45.72); James Guy (1:44.40); Matthew Richards (1:45.01); Duncan Scott (1:43.45); Calum Jarvis^{[a]}	6:58.58 ER	ROC; Martin Malyutin (1:45.69); Ivan Girev (1:45.63); Evgeny Rylov (1:45.26); Mikhail Dovgalyuk (1:45.23); Aleksandr Krasnykh^{[a]} Mikhail Vekovishchev^{[a]}	7:01.81	Australia; Alexander Graham (1:46.00); Kyle Chalmers (1:45.35); Zac Incerti (1:45.75); Thomas Neill (1:44.74); Mack Horton^{[a]} Elijah Winnington^{[a]}	7:01.84
4 × 100 m medley relay	United States; Ryan Murphy (52.31); Michael Andrew (58.49); Caeleb Dressel (49.03); Zach Apple (46.95); Hunter Armstrong^{[a]} Andrew Wilson^{[a]} Tom Shields^{[a]} Blake Pieroni^{[a]}	3:26.78 WR	Great Britain; Luke Greenbank (53.63); Adam Peaty (56.53); James Guy (50.27); Duncan Scott (47.08); James Wilby^{[a]}	3:27.51 ER	Italy; Thomas Ceccon (52.52); Nicolò Martinenghi (58.11); Federico Burdisso (51.07); Alessandro Miressi (47.47)	3:29.17 NR
AF African Record | AM Americas Record | SA South American Record | AS Asian Record | ER European Record | OC Oceanian Record | OR Olympic Record | WJR World Junior Record | WR World Record; NR National Record (any World Record is necessarily also an Olympic, area, and national record. Area records (for continental regions) are also national records)

^{a} Swimmers who participated in the heats only and received medals.

=== Women's events ===
Games	Gold		Silver		Bronze	
50 m freestyle	Emma McKeon; Australia	23.81 OR	Sarah Sjöström; Sweden	24.07	Pernille Blume; Denmark	24.21
100 m freestyle	Emma McKeon; Australia	51.96 OR, OC	Siobhán Haughey; Hong Kong	52.27 AS	Cate Campbell; Australia	52.52
200 m freestyle	Ariarne Titmus; Australia	1:53.50 OR	Siobhán Haughey; Hong Kong	1:53.92 AS	Penny Oleksiak; Canada	1:54.70
400 m freestyle	Ariarne Titmus; Australia	3:56.69 OC	Katie Ledecky; United States	3:57.36	Li Bingjie; China	4:01.08 AS
800 m freestyle	Katie Ledecky; United States	8:12.57	Ariarne Titmus; Australia	8:13.83 OC	Simona Quadarella; Italy	8:18.35
1500 m freestyle	Katie Ledecky; United States	15:37.34	Erica Sullivan; United States	15:41.41	Sarah Köhler; Germany	15:42.91 NR
100 m backstroke	Kaylee McKeown; Australia	57.47 OR	Kylie Masse; Canada	57.72	Regan Smith; United States	58.05
200 m backstroke	Kaylee McKeown; Australia	2:04.68	Kylie Masse; Canada	2:05.42 NR	Emily Seebohm; Australia	2:06.17
100 m breaststroke	Lydia Jacoby; United States	1:04.95	Tatjana Schoenmaker; South Africa	1:05.22	Lilly King; United States	1:05.54
200 m breaststroke	Tatjana Schoenmaker; South Africa	2:18.95 WR	Lilly King; United States	2:19.92	Annie Lazor; United States	2:20.84
100 m butterfly	Maggie Mac Neil; Canada	55.59 AM	Zhang Yufei; China	55.64	Emma McKeon; Australia	55.72 OC
200 m butterfly	Zhang Yufei; China	2:03.86 OR	Regan Smith; United States	2:05.30	Hali Flickinger; United States	2:05.65
200 m individual medley	Yui Ohashi; Japan	2:08.52	Alex Walsh; United States	2:08.65	Kate Douglass; United States	2:09.04
400 m individual medley	Yui Ohashi; Japan	4:32.08	Emma Weyant; United States	4:32.76	Hali Flickinger; United States	4:34.90
4 × 100 m freestyle relay	Australia; Bronte Campbell (53.01); Meg Harris (53.09); Emma McKeon (51.35); Cate Campbell (52.24); Mollie O'Callaghan^{[b]} Madison Wilson^{[b]}	3:29.69 WR	Canada; Kayla Sanchez (53.42); Maggie Mac Neil (53.47); Rebecca Smith (53.63); Penny Oleksiak (52.26); Taylor Ruck^{[b]}	3:32.78	United States; Erika Brown (54.02); Abbey Weitzeil (52.68); Natalie Hinds (53.15); Simone Manuel (52.96); Catie DeLoof^{[b]} Allison Schmitt^{[b]} Olivia Smoliga^{[b]}	3:32.81
4 × 200 m freestyle relay	China; Yang Junxuan (1:54.37); Tang Muhan (1:55.00); Zhang Yufei (1:55.66); Li Bingjie (1:55.30); Dong Jie^{[b]} Zhang Yifan^{[b]}	7:40.33 WR	United States; Allison Schmitt (1:56.34); Paige Madden (1:55.25); Katie McLaughlin (1:55.38); Katie Ledecky (1:53.76); Brooke Forde^{[b]} Bella Sims^{[b]}	7:40.73 AM	Australia; Ariarne Titmus (1:54.51); Emma McKeon (1:55.31); Madison Wilson (1:55.62); Leah Neale (1:55.85); Tamsin Cook^{[b]} Meg Harris^{[b]} Mollie O'Callaghan^{[b]} Brianna Throssell^{[b]}	7:41.29 OC
4 × 100 m medley relay	Australia; Kaylee McKeown (58.01); Chelsea Hodges (1:05.57); Emma McKeon (55.91); Cate Campbell (52.11); Emily Seebohm^{[b]} Brianna Throssell^{[b]} Mollie O'Callaghan^{[b]}	3:51.60 OR, OC	United States; Regan Smith (58.05); Lydia Jacoby (1:05.03); Torri Huske (56.16); Abbey Weitzeil (52.49); Rhyan White^{[b]} Lilly King^{[b]} Claire Curzan^{[b]} Erika Brown^{[b]}	3:51.73	Canada; Kylie Masse (57.90); Sydney Pickrem (1:07.17); Maggie Mac Neil (55.27); Penny Oleksiak (52.26); Taylor Ruck^{[b]} Kayla Sanchez^{[b]}	3:52.60 NR
AF African Record | AM Americas Record | SA South American Record | AS Asian Record | ER European Record | OC Oceanian Record | OR Olympic Record | WJR World Junior Record | WR World Record; NR National Record (any World Record is necessarily also an Olympic, area, and national record. Area records (for continental regions) are also national records)

^{b} Swimmers who participated in the heats only and received medals.

=== Mixed events ===
Games	Gold		Silver		Bronze	
4 × 100 m medley relay	Great Britain; Kathleen Dawson (58.80); Adam Peaty (56.78); James Guy (50.00); Anna Hopkin (52.00); Freya Anderson^{[c]}	3:37.58 WR	China; Xu Jiayu (52.56); Yan Zibei (58.11); Zhang Yufei (55.48); Yang Junxuan (52.71)	3:38.86	Australia; Kaylee McKeown (58.14); Zac Stubblety-Cook (58.82); Matthew Temple (50.26); Emma McKeon (51.73); Bronte Campbell^{[c]} Isaac Cooper^{[c]} Brianna Throssell^{[c]}	3:38.95
AF African Record | AM Americas Record | SA South American Record | AS Asian Record | ER European Record | OC Oceanian Record | OR Olympic Record | WJR World Junior Record | WR World Record; NR National Record (any World Record is necessarily also an Olympic, area, and national record. Area records (for continental regions) are also national records)

^{c} Swimmers who participated in the heats only and received medals.

== Records broken ==
=== Men ===
Event	Round	Swimmer	Team	Time	Date	Record	Day
Men's 800 metre freestyle	Heat 4	Mykhailo Romanchuk	Ukraine	7:41.28	27 July	OR	4
Men's 200 metre butterfly	Final	Kristóf Milák	Hungary	1:51.25	28 July	OR	5
Men's 200 metre breaststroke	Final	Zac Stubblety-Cook	Australia	2:06.38	29 July	OR	6
Men's 100 metre freestyle	Final	Caeleb Dressel	United States	47.02	29 July	OR	6
Men's 100 metre butterfly	Heat 8	Caeleb Dressel	United States	50.39	29 July	=OR	6
Men's 100 metre butterfly	Semifinal 1	Kristóf Milák	Hungary	50.31	30 July	OR	7
Men's 100 metre butterfly	Semifinal 2	Caeleb Dressel	United States	49.71	30 July	OR	7
Men's 200 metre backstroke	Final	Evgeny Rylov	ROC	1:53.27	30 July	OR	7
Men's 100 metre butterfly	Final	Caeleb Dressel	United States	49.45	31 July	WR	8
Men's 50 metre freestyle	Final	Caeleb Dressel	United States	21.07	1 August	OR	9
Men's 4 × 100 metre medley relay	Final	Ryan Murphy (52.31); Michael Andrew (58.49); Caeleb Dressel (49.03); Zach Apple (46.95)	United States	3:26.78	1 August	WR	9

=== Women ===
Event	Round	Swimmer	Team	Time	Date	Record	Day
Women's 100 metre freestyle	Final	Sarah Sjöström	Sweden	52.62 (r)	25 July	OR	2
Women's 4 × 100 metre freestyle relay	Final	Bronte Campbell (53.01); Meg Harris (53.09); Emma McKeon (51.35); Cate Campbell (52.24)	Australia	3:29.69	25 July	WR	2
Women's 100 metre backstroke	Heat 4	Kylie Masse	Canada	58.17	25 July	OR	2
Women's 100 metre backstroke	Heat 5	Regan Smith	United States	57.96	25 July	OR	2
Women's 100 metre backstroke	Heat 6	Kaylee McKeown	Australia	57.88	25 July	OR	2
Women's 100 metre breaststroke	Heat 5	Tatjana Schoenmaker	South Africa	1:04.82	25 July	OR	2
Women's 100 metre backstroke	Semifinal 1	Regan Smith	United States	57.86	26 July	OR	3
Women's 1500 metre freestyle	Heat 5	Katie Ledecky	United States	15:35.35	26 July	OR	3
Women's 100 metre backstroke	Final	Kaylee McKeown	Australia	57.47	27 July	OR	4
Women's 200 metre freestyle	Final	Ariarne Titmus	Australia	1:53.50	28 July	OR	5
Women's 100 metre freestyle	Heat 6	Emma McKeon	Australia	52.13	28 July	OR	5
Women's 200 metre breaststroke	Heat 4	Tatjana Schoenmaker	South Africa	2:19.16	28 July	OR	5
Women's 200 metre butterfly	Final	Zhang Yufei	China	2:03.86	29 July	OR	6
Women's 4 × 200 metre freestyle relay	Final	Yang Junxuan (1:54.37); Tang Muhan (1:55.00); Zhang Yufei (1:55.66); Li Bingjie (1:55.30)	China	7:40.33	29 July	WR	6
Women's 200 metre breaststroke	Final	Tatjana Schoenmaker	South Africa	2:18.95	30 July	WR	7
Women's 100 metre freestyle	Final	Emma McKeon	Australia	51.96	30 July	OR	7
Women's 50 metre freestyle	Heat 10	Emma McKeon	Australia	24.02	30 July	OR	7
Women's 50 metre freestyle	Semifinal 2	Emma McKeon	Australia	24.00	31 July	OR	8
Women's 50 metre freestyle	Final	Emma McKeon	Australia	23.81	1 August	OR	9
Women's 4 × 100 metre medley relay	Final	Kaylee McKeown (58.01); Chelsea Hodges (1:05.57); Emma McKeon (55.91); Cate Campbell (52.11)	Australia	3:51.60	1 August	OR	9

=== Mixed ===
Event	Round	Swimmer	Team	Time	Date	Record	Day
Mixed 4 × 100 metre medley relay	Heat 1	Kathleen Dawson (58.50); Adam Peaty (57.08); James Guy (50.58); Freya Anderson (52.59)	Great Britain	3:38.75	29 July	OR	6
Mixed 4 × 100 metre medley relay	Final	Kathleen Dawson (58.80); Adam Peaty (56.78); James Guy (50.00); Anna Hopkin (52.00)	Great Britain	3:37.58	31 July	WR	8

- All world records (WR) are consequently Olympic records (OR).

== Chinese swimming team doping allegation ==
On 20 April 2024, The New York Times revealed that 23 members of the Chinese swimming team tested positive for a performance-enhancing drug called Trimetazidine seven months prior to the start of the games and were allowed to participate in the games with some of the swimmers winning medals. Following the publication of the report, Travis Tygart, CEO of the United States Anti-Doping Agency, accused the World Anti-Doping Agency (WADA) and the China Anti-Doping Agency (CHINADA) of covering up doping by Chinese swimmers.

In response to Tygart's comments, WADA stated that it “stands by the results of its rigorous scientific investigation” into the case and was “astonished by the outrageous, completely false and defamatory remarks while CHINADA stated that the reports were misleading and that the doping tests they conducted only found that the swimmers had only tested extremely low concentration of Trimetazidine which was due to contamination at the hotel they were residing at that time," although any amount of the substance constitutes a ban.

In a second statement, Tygart accused both WADA and the CHINADA for not being transparent about the findings and keeping "clean athletes in the dark". WADA was alleged to have a double-standard as Russian figure skater Kamila Valieva tested positive for TMZ and used the same excuse, but was banned for four years following a two-year long investigation. However, WADA argued that contamination was not possible in Valieva's case based on the pharmacokinetic data. In contrast, according to WADA, in the case of the Chinese swimmers, several factors pointed towards contamination rather than deliberate doping. These include the lack of international competition at the time, only athletes from one hotel testing positive, inconsistencies in test results for the same athletes over short periods (some testing negative, then positive, then negative again), and the very low levels of the substance detected.

On 25 April 2024, WADA announced that Eric Cottier, a Swiss attorney, would launch an independent investigation into the matter, which also drew criticism since he was hand-picked by WADA. In May 2024, WADA announced that it hold an extraordinary meeting to discuss the doping case of the Chinese swimmers. On 9 July 2024, Cottier published his report, concluding that WADA had shown no bias towards China. He found the decision not to appeal was "reasonable, both from the point of view of the facts and the applicable rules". WADA President Witold Bańka welcomed the report, stating that it confirmed WADA's actions were fair and justified, highlighting the importance of clarifying these issues before the Paris 2024 Olympics.

== See also ==
- Artistic swimming at the 2020 Summer Olympics
- Swimming at the 2018 Asian Games
- Swimming at the 2018 Commonwealth Games
- Swimming at the 2018 Summer Youth Olympics
- Swimming at the 2019 African Games
- Swimming at the 2019 Pacific Games
- Swimming at the 2019 Pan American Games
- Swimming at the 2020 Summer Paralympics
