= Swimming at the 2020 Summer Olympics – Women's 200 metre butterfly =

Women's 200 metre butterfly at the Games of the XXXII Olympiad
- Venue: Tokyo Aquatics Centre
- Dates: 27 July 2021 (heats); 28 July 2021 (semifinals); 29 July 2021 (final)
- Competitors: 16 from 13 nations
- Winning time: 2:03.86 OR

Medalists
1st place, gold medalist(s)		Zhang Yufei	China
2nd place, silver medalist(s)		Regan Smith	United States
3rd place, bronze medalist(s)		Hali Flickinger	United States

The women's 200 metre butterfly event at the 2020 Summer Olympics was held from 27 to 29 July 2021 at the Tokyo Aquatics Centre. It was the event's fourteenth consecutive appearance, having been held at every edition since 1968.

== Summary ==
China's Zhang Yufei commanded the race from the beginning to continue a strong run of Chinese dominance in the event, delivering the nation its third title in four Olympics. Rebounding from a narrow loss in the 100 m butterfly earlier in the week, Zhang similarly roared to an early lead, touching more than a second and a half ahead of the U.S.' Hali Flickinger at the halfway mark. While she began to tire in the latter half of the race, Zhang clocked a new Olympic record of 2:03.86 - the fastest performance in textile and quickest time in 12 years - to best the field and win gold.

While the American duo of Flickinger and Regan Smith battled for the silver, Smith fired off the fastest closing split in the field to edge her compatriot and record a personal best time of 2:05.30. Meanwhile Flickinger, the bronze medallist in the 400 m individual medley, could not hold off her teammate at the finish and settled for her second bronze at these Games in 2:05.65. Hungary's reigning World champion Boglárka Kapás (2:06.53) was 3-hundredths of a second off her national record to take fourth. More than a second back, ROC's Svetlana Chimrova (2:07.70) claimed fifth while Zhang's teammate Yu Liyan (2:07.85) took sixth. Great Britain's 2018 Commonwealth Games champion Alys Thomas (2:07.90) could not replicate her winning performance from those championships, taking the penultimate spot in the final. Australia's Brianna Throssell repeated her eighth-place finish from Rio five years earlier, touching in 2:09.48 - almost three seconds behind her personal best time.

The medals for the competition were presented by Costa Rica's Laura Chinchilla, IOC Member, and the gifts were presented by Kazakhstan's Andrey Kryukov, FINA Bureau Member.

== Records ==
Prior to this competition, the existing world and Olympic records were as follows.

World record	Liu Zige (CHN)	2:01.81	Jinan, China	21 October 2009
Olympic record	Jiao Liuyang (CHN)	2:04.06	London, United Kingdom	1 August 2012

The following record was established during the competition:

Date	Event	Swimmer	Nation	Time	Record
29 July	Final	Zhang Yufei	China	2:03.86	OR

== Qualification ==
The Olympic Qualifying Time for the event is 2:08.43. Up to two swimmers per National Olympic Committee (NOC) can automatically qualify by swimming that time at an approved qualification event. The Olympic Selection Time is 2:12.28. Up to one swimmer per NOC meeting that time is eligible for selection, allocated by world ranking until the maximum quota for all swimming events is reached. NOCs without a female swimmer qualified in any event can also use their universality place.

== Competition format ==
The competition consists of three rounds: heats, semifinals, and a final. The swimmers with the best 16 times in the heats advance to the semifinals. The swimmers with the best 8 times in the semifinals advance to the final. Swim-offs are used as necessary to break ties for advancement to the next round.

== Schedule ==
All times are Japan Standard Time (UTC+9)

Date	Time	Round
27 July	19:25	Heats
28 July	10:57	Semifinals
29 July	11:28	Final

== Results ==
=== Heats ===
The swimmers with the top 16 times, regardless of heat, advanced to the semifinals.

As Katinka Hosszú withdrew before the event, all sixteen remaining swimmers were guaranteed to qualify for the semi-finals.

Although FINA rules would have allowed the Heats to be scratched and two straight semi-finals held, the decision was made to keep the original schedule.

Rank	Heat	Lane	Swimmer	Nation	Time	Notes
1	3	4	Zhang Yufei	China	2:07.50	Q
2	2	4	Hali Flickinger	United States	2:08.31	Q
3	1	5	Yu Liyan	China	2:08.36	Q
4	1	4	Regan Smith	United States	2:08.46	Q
5	3	5	Boglárka Kapás	Hungary	2:08.58	Q
6	1	6	Svetlana Chimrova	ROC	2:08.84	Q
7	3	3	Laura Stephens	Great Britain	2:09.00	Q
8	2	6	Alys Thomas	Great Britain	2:09.06	Q
9	2	3	Brianna Throssell	Australia	2:09.34	Q
10	2	2	Helena Bach	Denmark	2:09.37	Q
11	3	6	Franziska Hentke	Germany	2:09.98	Q
12	1	2	Defne Taçyıldız	Turkey	2:10.00	Q
13	1	3	Suzuka Hasegawa	Japan	2:10.43	Q
14	3	2	Ana Monteiro	Portugal	2:11.45	Q
15	3	7	Remedy Rule	Philippines	2:12.23	Q
16	2	7	Julimar Ávila	Honduras	2:15.36	Q, NR
	2	5	Katinka Hosszú	Hungary	DNS	

=== Semifinals ===
The swimmers with the best 8 times, regardless of heat, advanced to the final.

Rank	Heat	Lane	Swimmer	Nation	Time	Notes
1	2	4	Zhang Yufei	China	2:04.89	Q
2	1	4	Hali Flickinger	United States	2:06.23	Q
3	2	3	Boglárka Kapás	Hungary	2:06.59	Q
4	1	5	Regan Smith	United States	2:06.64	Q
5	2	5	Yu Liyan	China	2:07.04	Q
6	2	2	Brianna Throssell	Australia	2:08.41	Q
7	1	3	Svetlana Chimrova	ROC	2:08.62	Q
8	1	6	Alys Thomas	Great Britain	2:09.07	Q
9	2	1	Suzuka Hasegawa	Japan	2:09.42	
10	2	6	Laura Stephens	Great Britain	2:09.49	
11	1	1	Ana Monteiro	Portugal	2:09.82	
12	1	2	Helena Bach	Denmark	2:10.05	
13	2	7	Franziska Hentke	Germany	2:10.89	
14	1	7	Defne Taçyıldız	Turkey	2:11.27	
15	2	8	Remedy Rule	Philippines	2:12.89	
16	1	8	Julimar Ávila	Honduras	2:16.38	

=== Final ===
Rank	Lane	Name	Nation	Time	Notes
1st place, gold medalist(s)	4	Zhang Yufei	China	2:03.86	OR
2nd place, silver medalist(s)	6	Regan Smith	United States	2:05.30	
3rd place, bronze medalist(s)	5	Hali Flickinger	United States	2:05.65	
4	3	Boglárka Kapás	Hungary	2:06.53	
5	1	Svetlana Chimrova	ROC	2:07.70	
6	2	Yu Liyan	China	2:07.85	
7	8	Alys Thomas	Great Britain	2:07.90	
8	7	Brianna Throssell	Australia	2:09.48	
