= Swimming at the 2016 Summer Olympics – Women's 200 metre butterfly =

Women's 200 metre butterfly at the Games of the XXXI Olympiad
- Venue: Olympic Aquatics Stadium
- Dates: 9 August 2016 (heats & semifinals); 10 August 2016 (final)
- Competitors: 28 from 20 nations
- Winning time: 2:04.85

Medalists
1st place, gold medalist(s)		Mireia Belmonte	Spain
2nd place, silver medalist(s)		Madeline Groves	Australia
3rd place, bronze medalist(s)		Natsumi Hoshi	Japan

The women's 200 metre butterfly event at the 2016 Summer Olympics took place between 9–10 August at the Olympic Aquatics Stadium.

== Summary ==
Spain's Mireia Belmonte stormed home on the final lap to upgrade her silver from London 2012 with an Olympic title in this event, writing a historic milestone to become the country's first female swimming champion. Closing the gap between herself and Madeline Groves at the 150-metre turn, she pipped the Australian challenger with a half-stroke swim on the final stretch to a striking gold-medal triumph in 2:04.85. Groves commanded a solid lead through the first half of the race, but could not catch the Spaniard near the wall, stopping just 0.03 seconds behind with a 2:04.88 for the silver. Meanwhile, Japan's Natsumi Hoshi delivered a powerful back-half strategy to hold on the two leaders and repeat her bronze-medal feat from London 2012 in 2:05.20.

Swimming in lane eight, Cammile Adams of the United States missed out on the podium by seven tenths of a second, as she moved up from the outside to fourth with a lifetime best of 2:05.90. Separated from each other by a 0.03-second gap, Chinese duo Zhou Yilin (2:07.37) and Zhang Yufei (2:07.40) picked up the fifth and sixth spots respectively. Adams' teammate Hali Flickinger (2:07.71) and Australian youngster Brianna Throssell (2:07.87) closed out the field.

Notable swimmers missed the final roster, including British duo Hannah Miley and Aimee Willmott, Germany's Franziska Hentke, the reigning European champion, and Hungary's Katinka Hosszú, who later scratched the afternoon prelims to prepare herself instead for a historic medley double that happened in the evening session of the same day.

== Records ==
Prior to this competition, the existing world and Olympic records were as follows.

World record	Liu Zige (CHN)	2:01.81	Jinan, China	21 October 2009
Olympic record	Jiao Liuyang (CHN)	2:04.06	London, United Kingdom	1 August 2012

== Competition format ==
The competition consisted of three rounds: heats, semifinals, and a final. The swimmers with the best 16 times in the heats advanced to the semifinals. The swimmers with the best 8 times in the semifinals advanced to the final. Swim-offs were used as necessary to break ties for advancement to the next round.

== Results ==
=== Heats ===
Rank	Heat	Lane	Name	Nationality	Time	Notes
1	4	5	Mireia Belmonte	Spain	2:06.64	Q
2	3	5	Cammile Adams	United States	2:06.67	Q
2	4	2	Hali Flickinger	United States	2:06.67	Q
4	4	6	Liliána Szilágyi	Hungary	2:06.99	Q
5	4	4	Madeline Groves	Australia	2:07.22	Q
6	2	3	Suzuka Hasegawa	Japan	2:07.35	Q
7	3	4	Natsumi Hoshi	Japan	2:07.37	Q
8	2	5	Zhang Yufei	China	2:07.55	Q
9	2	4	Franziska Hentke	Germany	2:07.59	Q
10	3	3	Brianna Throssell	Australia	2:07.76	Q
11	4	1	Martina van Berkel	Switzerland	2:08.00	Q
12	4	3	Zhou Yilin	China	2:08.21	Q
13	2	7	An Se-hyeon	South Korea	2:08.42	Q
14	3	1	Anja Klinar	Slovenia	2:08.43	Q
15	2	6	Alessia Polieri	Italy	2:08.95	Q
16	2	2	Audrey Lacroix	Canada	2:09.21	Q
17	4	8	Stefania Pirozzi	Italy	2:09.40	
18	3	7	Lara Grangeon	France	2:09.69	
19	2	1	Aimee Willmott	Great Britain	2:09.71	
20	3	2	Judit Ignacio	Spain	2:09.82	
21	4	7	Park Jin-young	South Korea	2:09.99	
22	1	5	Nida Eliz Üstündağ	Turkey	2:10.02	
23	2	8	Andreina Pinto	Venezuela	2:10.60	
24	3	8	Joanna Maranhão	Brazil	2:10.69	
25	1	4	Helena Gasson	New Zealand	2:12.18	
26	1	3	Virginia Bardach	Argentina	2:13.58	
27	1	6	María Far Núñez	Panama	2:23.89	
			Katinka Hosszú	Hungary	DNS	

=== Semifinals ===
==== Semifinal 1 ====
Rank	Lane	Name	Nationality	Time	Notes
1	7	Zhou Yilin	China	2:06.52	Q
2	6	Zhang Yufei	China	2:06.95	Q
3	2	Brianna Throssell	Australia	2:07.19	Q
4	4	Cammile Adams	United States	2:07.22	Q
5	3	Suzuka Hasegawa	Japan	2:07.33	
6	5	Liliána Szilágyi	Hungary	2:07.34	
7	1	Anja Klinar	Slovenia	2:09.44	
8	8	Audrey Lacroix	Canada	2:09.95	

==== Semifinal 2 ====
Rank	Lane	Name	Nationality	Time	Notes
1	3	Madeline Groves	Australia	2:05.66	Q
2	4	Mireia Belmonte	Spain	2:06.06	Q
3	6	Natsumi Hoshi	Japan	2:06.74	Q
4	5	Hali Flickinger	United States	2:07.02	Q
5	2	Franziska Hentke	Germany	2:07.67	
6	7	Martina van Berkel	Switzerland	2:07.90	NR
7	1	An Se-hyeon	South Korea	2:08.69	
8	8	Alessia Polieri	Italy	2:09.35	

=== Final ===
Rank	Lane	Name	Nationality	Time	Notes
1st place, gold medalist(s)	5	Mireia Belmonte	Spain	2:04.85	
2nd place, silver medalist(s)	4	Madeline Groves	Australia	2:04.88	
3rd place, bronze medalist(s)	6	Natsumi Hoshi	Japan	2:05.20	
4	8	Cammile Adams	United States	2:05.90	
5	3	Zhou Yilin	China	2:07.37	
6	2	Zhang Yufei	China	2:07.40	
7	7	Hali Flickinger	United States	2:07.71	
8	1	Brianna Throssell	Australia	2:07.87	
