= Hali Flickinger =

American swimmer (born 1994)

Personal information
- National team: United States
- Born: July 7, 1994 (age 32) York, Pennsylvania, U.S.
- Height: 5 ft 5 in (165 cm)
- Weight: 115 lb (52 kg)

Sport
- Sport: Swimming
- Strokes: Freestyle, butterfly, medley
- Club: Cali Condors; Sun Devil Swimming
- College team: University of Georgia
- Coach: Jack Bauerle (U. Georgia)
Medal record
Women's swimming
Representing the United States
| Event | 1st | 2nd | 3rd |
|---|---|---|---|
| Olympic Games | 0 | 0 | 2 |
| World Championships (LC) | 2 | 2 | 0 |
| World Championships (SC) | 1 | 1 | 1 |
| Pan Pacific Championships | 1 | 0 | 0 |
| Total | 4 | 3 | 3 |
Olympic Games
| Bronze medal – third place | 2020 Tokyo | 200 m butterfly |
| Bronze medal – third place | 2020 Tokyo | 400 m medley |
World Championships (LC)
| Gold medal – first place | 2017 Budapest | 4×200 m freestyle |
| Gold medal – first place | 2022 Budapest | 4×200 m freestyle |
| Silver medal – second place | 2019 Gwangju | 200 m butterfly |
| Silver medal – second place | 2022 Budapest | 200 m butterfly |
World Championships (SC)
| Gold medal – first place | 2022 Melbourne | 400 m medley |
| Silver medal – second place | 2022 Melbourne | 200 m butterfly |
| Bronze medal – third place | 2022 Melbourne | 4×200 m freestyle |
Pan Pacific Championships
| Gold medal – first place | 2018 Tokyo | 200 m butterfly |
Summer Universiade
| Gold medal – first place | 2015 Gwangju | 4×200 m freestyle |
| Bronze medal – third place | 2015 Gwangju | 200 m butterfly |
| Bronze medal – third place | 2015 Gwangju | 400 m medley |

Hali Flickinger (born July 7, 1994) is an American retired swimmer who specializes in freestyle, butterfly, and individual medley events. She represents the Cali Condors of the International Swimming League.

Flickinger qualified for the 2016 Summer Olympics in the 200 meter butterfly and finished seventh in the finals. For the 2020 Summer Olympics, Flickinger qualified to compete in the 200 meter butterfly and 400 meter individual medley, and won the bronze medal in both events.

== Career ==
=== Early career ===
Flickinger grew up in Spring Grove, Pennsylvania, and swam for coach Michael Brooks at the York YMCA Aquatic Club. She graduated from Spring Grove Area High School, where she was a three-time Scholastic All-American. She was the national champion at the 2011 and 2012 YMCA Short Course national championships in the 200 yard butterfly, where she set a new event record both years. Internationally, she won silver in the 4 × 200 meter freestyle relay as a member of the prelim team and bronze in the 200 meter individual medley at the 2011 FINA Swimming World Cup meet in Moscow, Russia.

Collegiately, Flickinger helped the Georgia Bulldogs swimming and diving women's team win the NCAA Division I women's team title in 2013, 2014, and 2016. She graduated from the University of Georgia in 2017 with a degree in finance.

=== 2016–2018 ===
==== 2016 Summer Olympics ====
At the 2016 Summer Olympics in Rio de Janeiro, Brazil, Flickinger placed seventh in the 200 meter butterfly.

==== 2017 World Aquatics Championships ====
2017 World Championships
| Gold medal – first place | 4 × 200 m freestyle relay | 7:43:39 |

Flickinger swam at the 2017 World Aquatics Championships in Budapest, Hungary in July 2017. She competed in two events, winning a gold medal for her efforts as part of the 4 × 200 meter freestyle relay. She finished ninth in the semifinals of the 200 meter butterfly and did not advance to the final.

==== 2018 Pan Pacific Championships ====
2018 Pan Pacific Championships
| Gold medal – first place | 200 m butterfly | 2:07.35 |

At the 2018 US National Championships held in July in Irvine, California, Flickinger broke the 37-year-old US Open record set by Mary T. Meagher in 1981 at 2:05.96 in the 200 meter butterfly with her time of 2:05.87 in the prelims heats of the event. In August 2018 at the 2018 Pan Pacific Swimming Championships held in Tokyo, Japan, Flickinger won the gold medal in the 200 meter butterfly with a time of 2:07.35.

=== 2019 ===
==== 2019 World Aquatics Championships ====
2019 World Championships
| Silver medal – second place | 200 m butterfly | 2:06.95 |

At the 2019 World Aquatics Championships in Gwangju, South Korea in July 2019, Flickinger won the silver medal in the 200 meter butterfly. She swam a 2:06.95, finishing less than two tenths of a second behind Boglárka Kapás and less than one tenth of a second ahead of Katie Drabot. This was the first world championship medal Flickinger won in an individual event.

==== 2019 International Swimming League ====
In 2019 Flickinger was a member of the inaugural International Swimming League representing the Cali Condors, who finished third place in the final match in Las Vegas, Nevada in December. Flickinger won several events for the Condors including her specialty, the 200 meter butterfly, at the final.

=== 2021 ===
==== 2020 US Olympic Trials ====
NBC Sports: Flickinger takes 1st in 200 m butterfly at 2020 US Olympic Trials

On June 17, 2021, Flickinger won the 200 meter butterfly at the 2020 USA Swimming Olympic Trials, qualifying for the US Olympic Swimming Team. Her time in the final, a 2:05.85, was a new US Open record and Championship record. This was Flickinger's second consecutive Olympic Games making the US team. In addition to winning the 200 meter butterfly, she took second place with a time of 4:33.96 in the 400 meter individual medley on the first day of Olympic Trials, qualifying her for the Olympics in that event.

On day six of competition, Flickinger ranked 15th with a time of 2:12.02 in the morning prelims heats of the 200 meter backstroke and advanced to the semifinals. In the semifinals, she was eighth overall, swimming a 2:09.61 and advancing to the final on day seven. Flickinger decided not to swim in the 200 meter backstroke final.

==== 2020 Summer Olympics ====
2020 Summer Olympics
| Bronze medal – third place | 400 m individual medley | 4:34.90 |
| Bronze medal – third place | 200 m butterfly | 2:05.65 |

Flickinger was one of 17 entrants in the 200 meter butterfly at the 2020 Summer Olympics in Tokyo, Japan, which was the individual swimming event with the least number of entries at that year's Olympic Games. On July 24, 2021, Flickinger competed in the prelims of the 400 meter individual medley, finishing fifth overall with a time of 4:35.98, and advancing to the final. In the final the next morning, she finished third with a time of 4:34.90, winning the bronze medal in the event.

On day four of competition, Flickinger swam a 2:08.31 in the prelims of the 200 meter butterfly and qualified for the semifinals ranked second overall. The following day of competition, she lowered her time to 2:06.23 in the semifinals, ranked second for both semifinal heats, and advanced to the final. In the final on day six of competition, Flickinger won her second medal of the 2020 Olympic Games, a bronze medal in the 200 meter butterfly with a time of 2:05.65. She was the first swimmer from York County, Pennsylvania to win an Olympic medal since 1948, and she was also the first athlete from the county to win more than one Olympic medal during their career in over 80 years.

==== 2021 International Swimming League ====
Flickinger was selected for the Cali Condors team as part of the 2021 International Swimming League. She opted not to participate in the regular season of competition and entered to swim in the playoffs, appearing on the team's playoff roster. For the playoffs, she and a few other Cali Condors members, including fellow Olympian Caeleb Dressel, did not participate in the first match.

Flickinger made her 2021 International Swimming League debut in the 200 meter backstroke in the fourth match of the playoffs, match fifteen overall, swimming a 2:04.90, placing fifth, and earning 4.0 points for her team. For the 200 meter individual medley, she finished eighth with a time of 2:11.90. In the 400 meter freestyle, Flickinger won her first event of the season with a time of 4:00.82, which was three-hundredths of a second faster than second-place finisher Freya Anderson of the London Roar. Flickinger achieved her second win of the match on the second and final day of competition, winning the 200 meter butterfly with a time of 2:04.62 and earning 10.0 points for her team. For her last event of the match, she swam a 4:31.75 in the 400 meter individual medley, scoring 13.0 points and placing second.

=== 2022 ===
==== Pro Swim Series – San Antonio ====
On March 31, at the Pro Swim Series in San Antonio, Texas, Flickinger swam a 1:59.08 in the prelims heats of the 200 meter freestyle to qualify for the final ranking second and a 4:50.14 in the 400 meter individual medley to qualify for the final ranking first. In the finals of the events, she won the 400 meter individual medley with a 4:40.62 and placed fourth in the 200 meter freestyle with a 1:58.90. The following morning, she advanced to the final of the 200 meter butterfly with a 2:11.15 and first-rank and the final of the 400 meter freestyle with a 4:13.71 and third-rank. She won the 200 meter butterfly final with a 2:08.47 and placed third in the 400 meter freestyle final in 4:10.38. She swam 2:13.81 in the prelims heats of the 200 meter backstroke on the fourth and final day, qualifying for the final ranking sixth. Lowering her time to a 2:11.23 in the final, she placed fourth to conclude her competition at the Northside Swim Center for the Pro Swim Series stop.

==== 2022 International Team Trials ====
On the first day of the 2022 US International Team Trials in Greensboro, North Carolina, Flickinger ranked first in the preliminary heats of the 200 meter butterfly with a 2:07.75 and qualified for the evening final. She won the A final with a time of 2:06.35, qualifying for the world championships team. The second day, she qualified for the final of the 200 meter freestyle with a 1:58.31 in the morning prelims heats, ranking sixth overall. In the final, she placed fourth with a personal best time of 1:57.53, qualifying for the World Championships team in the 4×200 meter freestyle relay. Day three, she qualified for the final of the 400 meter individual medley with a 4:46.04 in the prelims heats. She improved upon her rank in the final, placing third with a time of 4:39.50. For the morning prelims heats of the 400 meter freestyle on day four, her fourth event at the Trials, she ranked fourth with a time of 4:10.03 and advanced to the evening final. She swam the race over two seconds faster in the final, placing fifth with a 4:07.97.

==== 2022 Swimming World Cup ====
For the 2022 FINA Swimming World Cup held in Berlin, Germany, the first stop in three for the circuit, Flickinger won a gold medal in the 400 meter individual medley with a 4:30.36 and a bronze medal in the 200 meter butterfly with a 2:05.63, as well as placing fourth in the 400 meter freestyle with a 4:03.01. Five days after the end of the first stop, the second stop began in Toronto, Canada, and she achieved a fourth-place finish in the 400 meter freestyle in 4:01.21 and approximately 35 minutes later won a silver medal in the 200 meter butterfly with a 2:04.00. In the 400 meter individual medley the next day, she placed fourth, behind three Canadians, with a time of 4:30.90.

The first day of the third and final stop, held in Indianapolis, Flickinger placed sixth in the final of the 400 meter freestyle on day one with a time of 4:02.51, which helped Americans achieve all of the top seven out of eight places. In the same session, she placed fourth in the 200 meter butterfly with a time of 2:05.50, finishing behind one Canadian (gold medalist) and two Americans (silver and bronze medalists). The following day, she placed sixth in the 400 meter individual medley with a 4:36.18, which was 4.88 seconds behind bronze medalist Bailey Andison of Canada. Based on her results for the whole 2022 World Cup, she ranked as the tenth highest-scoring overall female competitor, and the second highest-scoring female American competitor, only behind Beata Nelson.

==== 2022 World Short Course Championships ====
For the 2022 World Short Course Championships in December in Melbourne, Australia, Flickinger was named to the Team USA roster in the 200 meter butterfly and the 400 meter individual medley.

== International championships (50 m) ==
| Meet | 200 backstroke | 200 butterfly | 400 medley | 4×200 freestyle |
|---|---|---|---|---|
Junior level
| WJC 2011 | | | 6th | |
Senior level
| PAC 2014 | 11th (h) | 6th | 13th (h) | |
| WUG 2015 | | 3rd place, bronze medalist(s) | 3rd place, bronze medalist(s) | 1st place, gold medalist(s) |
| OG 2016 | | 7th | | |
| WC 2017 | | 9th | | (bronze) ^{[a]} |
| PAC 2018 | 8th | 1st place, gold medalist(s) | | |
| WC 2019 | | 2nd place, silver medalist(s) | | |
| OG 2020 | | 3rd place, bronze medalist(s) | 3rd place, bronze medalist(s) | |
| WC 2022 | | 2nd place, silver medalist(s) | | (bronze) ^{[a]} |

^{a} Flickinger swam only in the prelims heats.

== International championships (25 m) ==
| Meet | 200 freestyle | 200 butterfly | 400 medley | 4×200 freestyle |
|---|---|---|---|---|
| WC 2022 | 9th | 2nd place, silver medalist(s) | 1st place, gold medalist(s) | 3rd place, bronze medalist(s) |

== Personal best times ==
=== Long course meters (50 m pool) ===
| Event | Time | Meet | Location | Date | Ref |
|---|---|---|---|---|---|
| 100 m freestyle | 57.62 | TYR Pro Swim Series | Des Moines, Iowa | March 6, 2020 | |
| 200 m freestyle | 1:57.53 | 2022 US International Team Trials | Greensboro, North Carolina | April 27, 2022 | |
| 400 m freestyle | 4:06.72 | 2018 Georgia Bulldog Gand Slam | Atlanta, Georgia | July 7, 2018 | |
| 100 m backstroke | 1:00.96 | TYR Pro Swim Series | | April 12, 2019 | |
| 200 m backstroke | 2:08.36 | 2019 Atlanta Classic | Atlanta, Georgia | May 19, 2019 | |
| 100 m butterfly | 58.44 | 2019 Georgia Bulldog Gand Slam | Atlanta, Georgia | June 23, 2019 | |
| 200 m butterfly | 2:05.65 | 2020 Summer Olympics | Tokyo, Japan | July 29, 2021 | |
| 200 m individual medley | 2:12.62 | 2018 USA Swimming Championships | Irvine, California | July 29, 2018 | |
| 400 m individual medley | 4:33.96 | 2020 US Olympic Trials | Omaha, Nebraska | June 13, 2021 | |

=== Short course meters (25 m pool) ===
| Event | Time | Meet | Location | Date | Ref |
|---|---|---|---|---|---|
| 200 m freestyle | 1:54.26 | 2020 International Swimming League | Budapest, Hungary | November 22, 2020 | |
| 400 m freestyle | 3:58.26 | 2015 Duel in the Pool | Indianapolis, Indiana | December 11, 2015 | |
| 800 m freestyle | 8:37.27 | 2011 Swimming World Cup | Moscow, Russia | October 18, 2011 | |
| 200 m backstroke | 2:01.94 | 2020 International Swimming League | Budapest, Hungary | November 21, 2020 | |
| 200 m butterfly | 2:03.35 | 2020 International Swimming League | Budapest, Hungary | November 22, 2020 | |
| 100 m individual medley | 1:00.22 | 2020 International Swimming League | Budapest, Hungary | November 10, 2020 | |
| 200 m individual medley | 2:08.65 | 2021 International Swimming League | Eindhoven, Netherlands | December 3, 2021 | |
| 400 m individual medley | 4:25.50 | 2020 International Swimming League | Budapest, Hungary | November 22, 2020 | |

== Swimming World Cup circuits ==
The following medals Flickinger has won at Swimming World Cup circuits.

| Edition | Gold medals | Silver medals | Bronze medals | Total |
|---|---|---|---|---|
| 2011 | 0 | 2 | 0 | 2 |
| 2022 | 1 | 1 | 1 | 3 |
| Total | 1 | 3 | 1 | 5 |

== National records ==
=== Long course meters (50 m pool) ===
| Event | Time | | Meet | Date | Location | Type | Status | Age | Ref |
|---|---|---|---|---|---|---|---|---|---|
| 200 m butterfly | 2:05.87 | h | 2018 US National Championships | July 25, 2018 | Irvine, California | US | Former | 24 | |
| 200 m butterfly (2) | 2:05.85 | | 2020 US Olympic Trials | June 17, 2021 | Omaha, Nebraska | US | Former | 26 | |

Legend: US – US Open record;
Records not set in finals: h – heat; sf – semifinal; r – relay 1st leg; rh – relay heat 1st leg; b – B final; † – en route to final mark; so – swim-off; tt – time trial

== Awards and honors ==
- SwimSwam Top 100 (Women's): 2021 (#25), 2022 (#14)

== Personal life ==
Flickinger is married to fellow Georgia Bulldog swimmer Martin Grodzki, who proposed to her after her performances at the 2016 NCAA Division I Women's Swimming and Diving Championships in Atlanta. She and her husband were married by their swim coach Jack Bauerle before she competed at the 2019 World Aquatics Championships, which was held in July 2019.

The first sponsor Flickinger signed as part of her professional swimming career was swimming goods company Speedo in 2017.

One of Flickinger's hobbies outside the pool is using a stroller to walk her pet cat.
