= Sachi Mochida =

Japanese swimmer (born 1999)

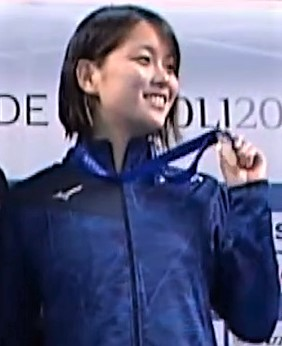
- Mochida at the 2019 Summer Universiade with bronze medal for the Women's 200m Butterfly Final

Personal information
- Born: 19 July 1999 (age 26) Nara Prefecture, Japan
- Height: 165 cm (5 ft 5 in)

Sport
- Sport: Swimming
Medal record
Representing Japan
Pan Pacific Championships
Silver medal – second place	2018 Tokyo	200 m butterfly
Asian Games
Silver medal – second place	2018 Jakarta	200 m butterfly
Silver medal – second place	2018 Jakarta	4×200 m freestyle
Universiade
Silver medal – second place	2019 Naples	4×100 m freestyle
Silver medal – second place	2019 Naples	200 m butterfly
World Junior Championships
Bronze medal – third place	2015 Singapore	4×100 m medley
Junior Pan Pacific Championships
Bronze medal – third place	2014 Maui	4×100 m freestyle
Bronze medal – third place	2014 Maui	4×200 m freestyle

Sachi Mochida (持田 早智, Mochida Sachi; born 19 July 1999) is a Japanese swimmer. She competed in the women's 4 × 200 metre freestyle relay event at the 2016 Summer Olympics.
