= Swimming at the 2018 Asian Games – Women's 200 metre butterfly =

Women's 200 metre butterfly at the 2018 Asian Games
- Venue: Gelora Bung Karno Aquatic Stadium
- Date: 22 August 2018
- Competitors: 15 from 9 nations

Medalists
gold medal	Zhang Yufei	China
silver medal	Sachi Mochida	Japan
bronze medal	Suzuka Hasegawa	Japan

The women's 200 metre butterfly event at the 2018 Asian Games took place on 22 August at the Gelora Bung Karno Aquatic Stadium, Jakarta, Indonesia.

== Schedule ==
All times are Western Indonesia Time (UTC+07:00)

Date	Time	Event
Wednesday, 22 August 2018	09:37	Heats
Wednesday, 22 August 2018	18:39	Final

== Records ==
Prior to this competition, the existing world, Asian and Games records were as follows.

World Record	Liu Zige (CHN)	2:01.81	Jinan, China	21 October 2009
Asian Record	Liu Zige (CHN)	2:01.81	Jinan, China	21 October 2009
Games Record	Jiao Liuyang (CHN)	2:05.79	Guangzhou, China	15 November 2010

== Results ==
=== Heats ===
Rank	Heat	Athlete	Time	Notes
1	2	Suzuka Hasegawa (JPN)	2:09.95	
2	1	Zhang Yufei (CHN)	2:10.83	
3	2	Sachi Mochida (JPN)	2:11.87	
4	1	Lê Thị Mỹ Thảo (VIE)	2:12.14	
5	1	An Se-hyeon (KOR)	2:12.22	
6	2	Quah Jing Wen (SGP)	2:13.35	
7	1	Adinda Larasati Dewi (INA)	2:14.10	
8	2	Yu Liyan (CHN)	2:14.56	
9	2	Azzahra Permatahani (INA)	2:17.56	
10	2	Park Ye-rin (KOR)	2:18.71	
11	1	Karen Liu (HKG)	2:23.86	
12	1	Katii Tang (HKG)	2:30.08	
13	2	Batbayaryn Enkhkhüslen (MGL)	2:40.50	
14	2	Altanshagain Kherlen (MGL)	2:52.60	
15	1	Anmau Ahmed Saleem (MDV)	3:34.62	

=== Final ===
Rank	Athlete	Time	Notes
1st place, gold medalist(s)	Zhang Yufei (CHN)	2:06.61	
2nd place, silver medalist(s)	Sachi Mochida (JPN)	2:08.72	
3rd place, bronze medalist(s)	Suzuka Hasegawa (JPN)	2:08.80	
4	An Se-hyeon (KOR)	2:08.83	
5	Quah Jing Wen (SGP)	2:12.01	
6	Yu Liyan (CHN)	2:12.61	
7	Lê Thị Mỹ Thảo (VIE)	2:13.93	
8	Adinda Larasati Dewi (INA)	2:14.54	
