= Swimming at the 2022 World Aquatics Championships – Women's 200 metre butterfly =

Women's 200 metre butterfly at the 2022 World Aquatics Championships
- Venue: Danube Arena
- Location: Budapest, Hungary
- Dates: 21 June (heats and semifinals); 22 June (final)
- Competitors: 25 from 20 nations
- Winning time: 2:05.20

Medalists
| gold medal | Summer McIntosh | Canada |
| silver medal | Hali Flickinger | United States |
| bronze medal | Zhang Yufei | China |

The Women's 200 metre butterfly competition at the 2022 World Aquatics Championships was held on 21 and 22 June 2022.

== Records ==
Prior to the competition, the existing world and championship records were as follows.

| World record | Liu Zige (CHN) | 2:01.81 | Jinan, China | 21 October 2009 |
| Competition record | Jessicah Schipper (AUS) | 2:03.41 | Rome, Italy | 30 July 2009 |

== Results ==
=== Heats ===
The heats were started on 21 June at 10:00.

| Rank | Heat | Lane | Name | Nationality | Time | Notes |
|---|---|---|---|---|---|---|
| 1 | 1 | 3 | Summer McIntosh | Canada | 2:07.26 | Q |
| 2 | 1 | 4 | Hali Flickinger | United States | 2:07.31 | Q |
| 3 | 3 | 5 | Kina Hayashi | Japan | 2:08.63 | Q |
| 4 | 2 | 3 | Elizabeth Dekkers | Australia | 2:08.98 | Q |
| 5 | 2 | 4 | Regan Smith | United States | 2:09.02 | Q |
| 6 | 3 | 4 | Zhang Yufei | China | 2:09.21 | Q |
| 7 | 2 | 5 | Boglárka Kapás | Hungary | 2:09.24 | Q |
| 7 | 3 | 2 | Helena Bach | Denmark | 2:09.24 | Q |
| 9 | 1 | 2 | María Mata | Mexico | 2:09.32 | Q, NR |
| 10 | 1 | 5 | Laura Stephens | Great Britain | 2:10.07 | Q |
| 11 | 1 | 6 | Abbey Connor | Australia | 2:10.10 | Q |
| 12 | 3 | 7 | Lana Pudar | Bosnia and Herzegovina | 2:10.20 | Q |
| 13 | 3 | 3 | Zhu Jiaming | China | 2:11.20 | Q |
| 14 | 3 | 6 | Katinka Hosszú | Hungary | 2:11.22 | Q |
| 15 | 3 | 1 | Lea Polonsky | Israel | 2:11.40 | Q |
| 16 | 2 | 6 | Chiho Mizuguchi | Japan | 2:11.65 | Q |
| 17 | 2 | 2 | Quah Jing Wen | Singapore | 2:11.79 | |
| 18 | 2 | 7 | Giovanna Diamante | Brazil | 2:12.39 | |
| 19 | 2 | 1 | Georgia Damasioti | Greece | 2:13.12 | |
| 20 | 3 | 8 | Karen Durango | Colombia | 2:14.20 | |
| 21 | 2 | 8 | Jinjutha Pholjamjumrus | Thailand | 2:15.89 | |
| 22 | 1 | 8 | Julimar Ávila | Honduras | 2:17.40 | |
| 23 | 1 | 1 | Thị Mỹ Thảo Lê | Vietnam | 2:18.65 | |
| 24 | 3 | 0 | Alondra Ortíz | Costa Rica | 2:19.01 | |
| 25 | 2 | 0 | Hayley Wong | Brunei | 2:35.48 | |
| | 1 | 7 | Helena Gasson | New Zealand | Did not start | |

=== Semifinals ===
The semifinals were started on 21 June at 19:18.

| Rank | Heat | Lane | Name | Nationality | Time | Notes |
|---|---|---|---|---|---|---|
| 1 | 2 | 4 | Summer McIntosh | Canada | 2:05.79 | Q, WJR, NR |
| 2 | 1 | 4 | Hali Flickinger | United States | 2:05.90 | Q |
| 3 | 2 | 3 | Regan Smith | United States | 2:07.13 | Q |
| 4 | 1 | 7 | Lana Pudar | Bosnia and Herzegovina | 2:07.58 | Q, NR |
| 5 | 1 | 3 | Zhang Yufei | China | 2:07.76 | Q |
| 6 | 1 | 5 | Elizabeth Dekkers | Australia | 2:07.77 | Q |
| 7 | 1 | 6 | Helena Bach | Denmark | 2:07.82 | Q |
| 8 | 2 | 6 | Boglárka Kapás | Hungary | 2:07.89 | Q |
| 9 | 2 | 5 | Kina Hayashi | Japan | 2:08.32 | |
| 10 | 1 | 2 | Laura Stephens | Great Britain | 2:08.47 | |
| 11 | 2 | 2 | María Mata | Mexico | 2:09.78 | |
| 12 | 2 | 7 | Abbey Connor | Australia | 2:09.88 | |
| 13 | 1 | 1 | Katinka Hosszú | Hungary | 2:10.64 | |
| 14 | 2 | 1 | Zhu Jiaming | China | 2:11.19 | |
| 15 | 2 | 8 | Lea Polonsky | Israel | 2:11.31 | |
| 16 | 1 | 8 | Chiho Mizuguchi | Japan | 2:12.54 | |

=== Final ===
The final was held on 22 June at 18:02.

| Rank | Lane | Name | Nationality | Time | Notes |
|---|---|---|---|---|---|
| 1st place, gold medalist(s) | 4 | Summer McIntosh | Canada | 2:05.20 | WJ, NR |
| 2nd place, silver medalist(s) | 5 | Hali Flickinger | United States | 2:06.08 | |
| 3rd place, bronze medalist(s) | 2 | Zhang Yufei | China | 2:06.32 | |
| 4 | 3 | Regan Smith | United States | 2:06.79 | |
| 5 | 7 | Elizabeth Dekkers | Australia | 2:07.01 | |
| 6 | 6 | Lana Pudar | Bosnia and Herzegovina | 2:07.85 | |
| 7 | 8 | Boglárka Kapás | Hungary | 2:08.12 | |
| 7 | 1 | Helena Bach | Denmark | 2:08.12 | |
