= Zhu Jiaming =

Chinese swimmer (born 2001)

Personal information
- Nationality: Chinese
- Born: 14 August 2001 (age 24)

Sport
- Sport: Swimming
Medal record
Women's swimming
Representing China
World Championships (SC)
Bronze medal – third place	2021 Abu Dhabi	4 x 100m medley

Zhu Jiaming (born 14 August 2001) is a Chinese swimmer. She competed in the women's 200 metre butterfly at the 2019 World Aquatics Championships. She also competed in the women's 200 metre butterfly at the 2022 World Aquatics Championships held in Budapest, Hungary where she was eliminated in the semifinals.
