= Katie Rock =

Albanian swimmer (born 2003)

Personal information
- Born: 13 July 2003 (age 22)

Sport
- Sport: Swimming

Katie Rock (born 13 July 2003) is an Albanian swimmer. She represented Albania both at the 2018 Summer Youth Olympics in Buenos Aires, Argentina and at the 2019 World Aquatics Championships in Gwangju, South Korea.

At the 2018 Summer Youth Olympics she competed in the girls' 200 metre butterfly and girls' 400 metre freestyle events.

In 2019, she competed in the women's 100 metre butterfly and women's 200 metre butterfly events at the 2019 World Aquatics Championships. In both events she did not advance to compete in the semi-finals.
