= Swimming at the 2022 Asian Games – Women's 200 metre butterfly =

200m women's swimming 2022 Asian Games

Women's 200 metre butterfly at the 2022 Asian Games
- Venue: Hangzhou Olympic Expo Aquatics Center
- Date: 24 September 2023
- Competitors: 14 from 9 nations

Medalists
gold medal	Zhang Yufei	China
silver medal	Yu Liyan	China
bronze medal	Hiroko Makino	Japan

The Women's 200 metre butterfly event at the 2022 Asian Games took place on 24 September 2023 at the Hangzhou Olympic Expo Center.

== Schedule ==
All times are China Standard Time (UTC+08:00)

Date	Time	Event
Sunday, 24 September 2023	10:00	Heats
Sunday, 24 September 2023	19:30	Final

== Records ==
Prior to this competition, the existing world, Asian and Games records were as follows.

World Record	Liu Zige (CHN)	2:01.81	Jinan, China	21 October 2009
Asian Record	Liu Zige (CHN)	2:01.81	Jinan, China	21 October 2009
Games Record	Jiao Liuyang (CHN)	2:05.79	Guangzhou, China	15 November 2010

== Results ==
Legend

- DSQ — Disqualified

=== Heats ===
Rank	Heat	Athlete	Time	Notes
1	1	Zhang Yufei (CHN)	2:07.46	
2	2	Yu Liyan (CHN)	2:10.75	
3	2	Airi Mitsui (JPN)	2:11.31	
4	2	Quah Jing Wen (SGP)	2:11.47	
5	2	Kamonchanok Kwanmuang (THA)	2:11.87	
6	1	Park Su-jin (KOR)	2:12.34	
7	1	Hiroko Makino (JPN)	2:12.94	
8	2	Jinjutha Pholjamjumrus (THA)	2:13.90	
9	1	Yeung Hoi Ching (HKG)	2:14.46	
10	1	Mok Sze Ki (HKG)	2:15.38	
11	2	Diana Taszhanova (KAZ)	2:16.34	
12	1	Temüüjingiin Anungoo (MGL)	2:40.32	
13	2	Meral Ayn Latheef (MDV)	3:04.45	
—	1	Gansüldiin Erkhes (MGL)	DSQ	

=== Final ===
Rank	Athlete	Time	Notes
1st place, gold medalist(s)	Zhang Yufei (CHN)	2:05.57	GR
2nd place, silver medalist(s)	Yu Liyan (CHN)	2:08.31	
3rd place, bronze medalist(s)	Hiroko Makino (JPN)	2:09.22	
4	Park Su-jin (KOR)	2:09.37	
5	Quah Jing Wen (SGP)	2:10.13	
6	Kamonchanok Kwanmuang (THA)	2:10.68	
7	Airi Mitsui (JPN)	2:11.30	
8	Jinjutha Pholjamjumrus (THA)	2:15.22	
