= Swimming at the 2020 Summer Olympics – Women's 400 metre individual medley =

Women's 400 metre individual medley at the Games of the XXXII Olympiad
- Venue: Tokyo Aquatics Centre
- Dates: 24 July 2021 (heats); 25 July 2021 (final)
- Competitors: 17 from 13 nations
- Winning time: 4:32.08

Medalists
1st place, gold medalist(s)		Yui Ohashi	Japan
2nd place, silver medalist(s)		Emma Weyant	United States
3rd place, bronze medalist(s)		Hali Flickinger	United States

The women's 400 metre individual medley event at the 2020 Summer Olympics was held on 24 and 25 July 2021 at the Tokyo Aquatics Centre. It was the event's fifteenth consecutive appearance, having been held at every edition since 1964.

== Summary ==
Japan's home favourite Yui Ohashi held off a late charge from the U.S.' Emma Weyant to win her nation's first Olympic title in the event (she would go on to win gold in the 200 m medley as well). Second at the halfway mark, Ohashi used a stunning breaststroke leg to separate herself from the tight field and touch in 4:32.08 for gold. Meanwhile, Weyant, 1.99 seconds behind Ohashi heading into the freestyle, stormed home to take silver in 4:32.76. Weyant's teammate Hali Flickinger moved through the field in the final lap to win bronze more than two seconds behind in 4:34.90.

Spain's defending bronze medallist Mireia Belmonte (4:35.13) could not repeat her podium efforts from Rio five years earlier and settled for fourth. In the hunt for a medal, Hungary's defending champion Katinka Hosszú faded down the stretch to take fifth in 4:35.98, almost 10 seconds off her world record set at the last Games. Hosszú's teammate Viktória Mihályvári-Farkas (4:37.75) took sixth, while Great Britain's Aimee Willmott (4:38.30) repeated her seventh-place finish from Rio five years earlier. Outside the sub 4:40 club, Italy's Ilaria Cusinato (4:40.65) rounded out the championship field.

== Records ==
Prior to this competition, the existing world and Olympic records were as follows.

World record	Katinka Hosszú (HUN)	4:26.36	Rio de Janeiro, Brazil	6 August 2016
Olympic record	Katinka Hosszú (HUN)	4:26.36	Rio de Janeiro, Brazil	6 August 2016

No new records were set during the competition.

== Qualification ==
The Olympic Qualifying Time for the event is 4:38.53. Up to two swimmers per National Olympic Committee (NOC) can automatically qualify by swimming that time at an approved qualification event. The Olympic Selection Time is 4:46.89. Up to one swimmer per NOC meeting that time is eligible for selection, allocated by world ranking until the maximum quota for all swimming events is reached. NOCs without a female swimmer qualified in any event can also use their universality place.

== Competition format ==
The competition consists of two rounds: heats and a final. The swimmers with the best 8 times in the heats advance to the final. Swim-offs are used as necessary to break ties for advancement to the next round.

== Schedule ==
All times are Japan Standard Time (UTC+9)

Date	Time	Round
24 July	20:05	Heats
25 July	11:12	Final

== Results ==
=== Heats ===
The swimmers with the top 8 times, regardless of heat, advance to the final.

Rank	Heat	Lane	Swimmer	Nation	Time	Notes
1	3	5	Emma Weyant	United States	4:33.55	Q
2	3	6	Aimee Willmott	Great Britain	4:35.28	Q
3	2	4	Yui Ohashi	Japan	4:35.71	Q
4	3	3	Mireia Belmonte	Spain	4:35.88	Q
5	2	5	Hali Flickinger	United States	4:35.98	Q
6	2	6	Viktória Mihályvári-Farkas	Hungary	4:35.99	Q
7	3	4	Katinka Hosszú	Hungary	4:36.01	Q
8	2	7	Ilaria Cusinato	Italy	4:37.37	Q
9	3	2	Sara Franceschi	Italy	4:39.93	
10	3	1	Anja Crevar	Serbia	4:40.50	
11	2	1	Yu Yiting	China	4:41.64	
12	3	8	Ageha Tanigawa	Japan	4:41.76	
13	3	7	Fantine Lesaffre	France	4:41.98	
14	2	2	Tessa Cieplucha	Canada	4:44.54	
15	1	5	Katja Fain	Slovenia	4:44.66	
16	1	3	Azzahra Permatahani	Indonesia	4:54.54	
17	1	4	Virginia Bardach	Argentina	5:01.98	
—	2	3	Sydney Pickrem	Canada	DNS	

=== Final ===
Rank	Lane	Swimmer	Nation	Time	Notes
1st place, gold medalist(s)	3	Yui Ohashi	Japan	4:32.08	
2nd place, silver medalist(s)	4	Emma Weyant	United States	4:32.76	
3rd place, bronze medalist(s)	2	Hali Flickinger	United States	4:34.90	
4	6	Mireia Belmonte	Spain	4:35.13	
5	1	Katinka Hosszú	Hungary	4:35.98	
6	7	Viktória Mihályvári-Farkas	Hungary	4:37.75	
7	5	Aimee Willmott	Great Britain	4:38.30	
8	8	Ilaria Cusinato	Italy	4:40.65	
