= Yu Liyan =

Chinese swimmer (born 2000)

Personal information
- Nationality: Chinese
- Born: 1 June 2000 (age 26) Shenzhen, Guangdong, China
- Height: 168 cm (5 ft 6 in)

Sport
- Sport: Swimming
- Strokes: Butterfly stroke
Medal record
Women's swimming
Representing China
Asian Games
Silver medal – second place	2022 Hangzhou	200 m butterfly
World University Games
Silver medal – second place	2025 Rhine-Ruhr	4×100 m freestyle
Silver medal – second place	2025 Rhine-Ruhr	4×200 m freestyle

Yu Liyan (Chinese: 俞李妍, born 1 June 2000) is a Chinese swimmer. She competed in the women's 200 metre butterfly at the 2020 Summer Olympics held in Tokyo, Japan.

In 2018, she represented China at the 2018 Asian Games held in Jakarta, Indonesia. She competed in the women's 200 metre butterfly event.
