= Zhou Yilin =

Chinese swimmer (born 1992)

Personal information
- Full name: Zhou Yilin
- National team: China
- Born: 18 September 1992 (age 34)
- Height: 1.75 m (5 ft 9 in)
- Weight: 63 kg (139 lb)

Sport
- Sport: Swimming
- Strokes: Freestyle, butterfly
Medal record
Women's swimming
Representing China
Asian Games
Gold medal – first place	2014 Incheon	4×100 m freestyle

Zhou Yilin (Chinese: 周義霖; pinyin: Zhōu Yī lín; born 18 September 1992) is a Chinese competitive swimmer who specializes in sprint freestyle and butterfly events.

== Career ==
At the 2014 Asian Games in Incheon, South Korea, Zhou was part of the Chinese team which won gold in the women's 4 × 100 m freestyle relay. Zhou competed in the heats, where she swam her leg in 56.29 seconds.

At the 2016 Summer Olympics in Rio de Janeiro, Brazil, Zhou is competing in the women's 200 metre butterfly. She won the first semifinal with a time of 2:06.52 to qualify for Wednesday's final.
