= Ana Monteiro =

Portuguese swimmer (born 1993)

Personal information
- Full name: Ana Catarina Martins Cunha Monteiro
- Nationality: Portuguese
- Born: 14 August 1993 (age 32) Vila do Conde, Portugal
- Height: 1.64 m (5 ft 5 in)
- Weight: 57 kg (126 lb)

Sport
- Sport: Swimming
Medal record
Women's swimming
Representing Portugal
Mediterranean Games
Silver medal – second place	2018 Tarragona	200 m butterfly
Silver medal – second place	2022 Oran	200 m butterfly

Ana Catarina Martins Cunha Monteiro (born 14 August 1993) is a Portuguese swimmer. She competed in the women's 200 metre butterfly at the 2019 World Aquatics Championships. She competed in the women's 200 metre butterfly at the 2020 Summer Olympics.
