= Katie Drabot =

American swimmer (born 1997)

Personal information
- Full name: Katherine Drabot
- National team: United States
- Born: September 2, 1997 (age 29) Cedarburg, Wisconsin, U.S.
- Height: 5 ft 7 in (170.2 cm)

Sport
- Sport: Swimming
- Strokes: Freestyle
- Club: Ozaukee Aquatics
- College team: Stanford University
- Coach: Greg Meehan
Medal record
Women's swimming
Representing United States
World Championships (LC)
Bronze medal – third place	2019 Gwangju	200 m butterfly
Pan Pacific Championships
Bronze medal – third place	2018 Tokyo	200 m butterfly
World University Games
Silver medal – second place	2017 Taipei	200 m freestyle
Silver medal – second place	2017 Taipei	4 × 200 m freestyle
Bronze medal – third place	2017 Taipei	4 × 100 m freestyle
Junior Pan Pacific Championships
Gold medal – first place	2014 Maui	200 m freestyle
Gold medal – first place	2014 Maui	4 × 200 m freestyle
Gold medal – first place	2014 Maui	4 × 100 m medley
Silver medal – second place	2014 Maui	4 × 100 m freestyle

Katie Drabot (born September 2, 1997) is an American swimmer specializing in freestyle and butterfly. She placed second behind Siobhán Haughey in the 200 m freestyle at the 2017 University Games in Taipei, and won a bronze medal at both the 2018 Pan Pacific Championships in Tokyo, Japan and the 2019 World Aquatic Championships in Gwangju, South Korea in the 200-meter butterfly.

== Cedarburg High swimming ==
Katie holds the Cedarburg High School and state records in the 200 IM, 200 free, 50 free, 100 free, 100 fly, 500 free, 100 breast, 4x50 medley relay, 4x50 free relay, and 4x100 free relay.

== High School state championships 2013-15 ==
At the November, 2013 Wisconsin State Championships at the University of Wisconsin, as only a Freshman at Cedarburg High School, part of the Wisconsin Interscholastic Athletic Association, Katie won the 200 Individual Medley with a time of 2:00.23, helping the team place second statewide.

Swimming for Cedarsburg at the November 2013 State Championships again at U of Wisconsin, Madison, Katie won the 200 free, a future signature event, with a 1:46.08, and showing stroke versatility won the 200 Individual Medley as well with a 1:59.89.

=== Wisconsin state records 2014 ===
At the WIAA State Championship in Milwaukee in November 2014, Drabot set two state records swimming for Cedarburg. She set a state record and placed first in the 200 freestyle with a 1:45.40, a state record and a first place in the 500 freestyle with a 4:43.09, and swam a second place in the 400 freestyle relay with a 3:25.19.

Making a strong showing at the Wisconsin State Tournament in 2015, the following year in Madison while still swimming for Cedarburg High School, she took a first place in the 200 freestyle with a time of 1:44.21, a first place 48.55 in the 100 freestyle and swam anchor for the first place 400 free relay team with a time of 3:23.49 at the Wisconsin State Tournament in Mid-November 2015.

== Olympic trials ==
Though never having competed in the Olympics, at only 14 Katie qualified for the Olympic trials in 2012. In 2016, she made it to the semi-finals in the Trials in the 200 freestyle. She qualified for the 2020 Olympic Trials and made it to the finals in the 200 butterfly.

=== College age swimming ===
She attended and swam for Stanford University from 2017-2020. In her exceptional career at Stanford, she was a member of NCAA championship teams for three years from 2017–19, and a member of Pac-12 championship teams for four years from 2017-2020. Individually, she was a national champion in three events; in the 400 free relay in 2018, and in the 800 free relay in 2018 and 2019. Katie was a 13-time All-American, nine times in individual events, and four times in relays.

She was also a part of the American record-breaking 800 freestyle relay at the 2017 Pac-12 Championships, along with Lia Neal, Ella Eastin, and Katie Ledecky.

=== International competition ===
In the 2014 Junior Pan Pacifics, she took three golds and a silver medal, with a gold in the 200 freestyle, a gold in the 4x200 freestyle, a gold in the 4x100 meter medley relay, and a silver in the 4x100-meter freestyle.

At the 2017 World University Games in Taipei, Drabot won a trio of medals, taking silver in the 200 free and helping the American 4×100 and 4×200 women’s free relays to bronze and silver medals.

In the 2018 Tokyo Pan Pacific Championships, she too a bronze in the 200-meter butterfly with an impressive time of 2:07.8. That time ranked her fifth in the world in the event.

In one of her more prestigious international achievements, Katie took a bronze in the 200-meter butterfly at the 2019 World Aquatics Championships in Gwangju, Korea.
