= Laura Stephens =

British swimmer (born 1999)

Personal information
- Full name: Laura Kathleen Jane Stephens
- Nationality: British (English)
- Born: 2 June 1999 (age 27) London, England

Sport
- Sport: Swimming
- Strokes: Butterfly
Medal record
Representing Great Britain
World Championships (LC)
Gold medal – first place	2024 Doha	200 m butterfly
European Championships (LC)
Gold medal – first place	2020 Budapest	4×100 m medley
Representing England
Commonwealth Games
Silver medal – second place	2022 Birmingham	200 m butterfly
Bronze medal – third place	2022 Birmingham	4×100 m medley

Laura Kathleen Jane Stephens (born 2 June 1999) is a retired British swimmer. In 2024 she won the gold medal for the 200 metre butterfly at the 2024 World Aquatics Championships and competed at the 2024 Summer Olympics.

== Career ==
Stephens competed in the women's 200 metre butterfly at the 2019 World Aquatics Championships, where she reached the final. In 2022, she represented England at the 2022 Commonwealth Games in Birmingham, where she won two medals.

In 2023, she won the gold medal at the 2023 British Swimming Championships in the 200 metres butterfly. It was the second time that she had won the 200 metres title, having won it in 2022 as well.

After finishing second in the 200 metres butterfly at the 2024 Aquatics GB Swimming Championships, Stephens recorded a time that met the British Consideration criteria for a place at the 2024 Summer Olympics. She was subsequently named in the British team for the Olympics. At the Olympic Games, Stephens reached the final of the women's 200 metre butterfly.
