= Hiroko Makino =

Japanese swimmer (born 1999)

Personal information
- Born: 20 August 1999 (age 27)

Sport
- Sport: Swimming
Medal record
Women's swimming
Representing Japan
Asian Games
Gold medal – first place	2022 Hangzhou	4x100m medley relay
Silver medal – second place	2022 Hangzhou	4x200m freestyle relay
Silver medal – second place	2022 Hangzhou	Mixed 4x100m medley relay
Bronze medal – third place	2022 Hangzhou	200m butterfly
Junior Pan Pacific Championships
Silver medal – second place	2014 Maui	400 m medley
Bronze medal – third place	2014 Maui	4×200 m freestyle

Hiroko Makino (牧野 紘子, Makino Hiroko; born 20 August 1999) is a Japanese swimmer. She competed in the women's 200 metre butterfly event at the 2017 World Aquatics Championships.

At the 2014 Junior Pan Pacific Swimming Championships in Hawaii, United States, Makino won a silver medal in the 400 metre individual medley with a time of 4:45.23 and a bronze medal in the 4×200 metre freestyle relay, where she split a 2:02.62 to contribute to the final time of 8:09.26.
