= Suzuka Hasegawa =

Japanese swimmer (born 2000)

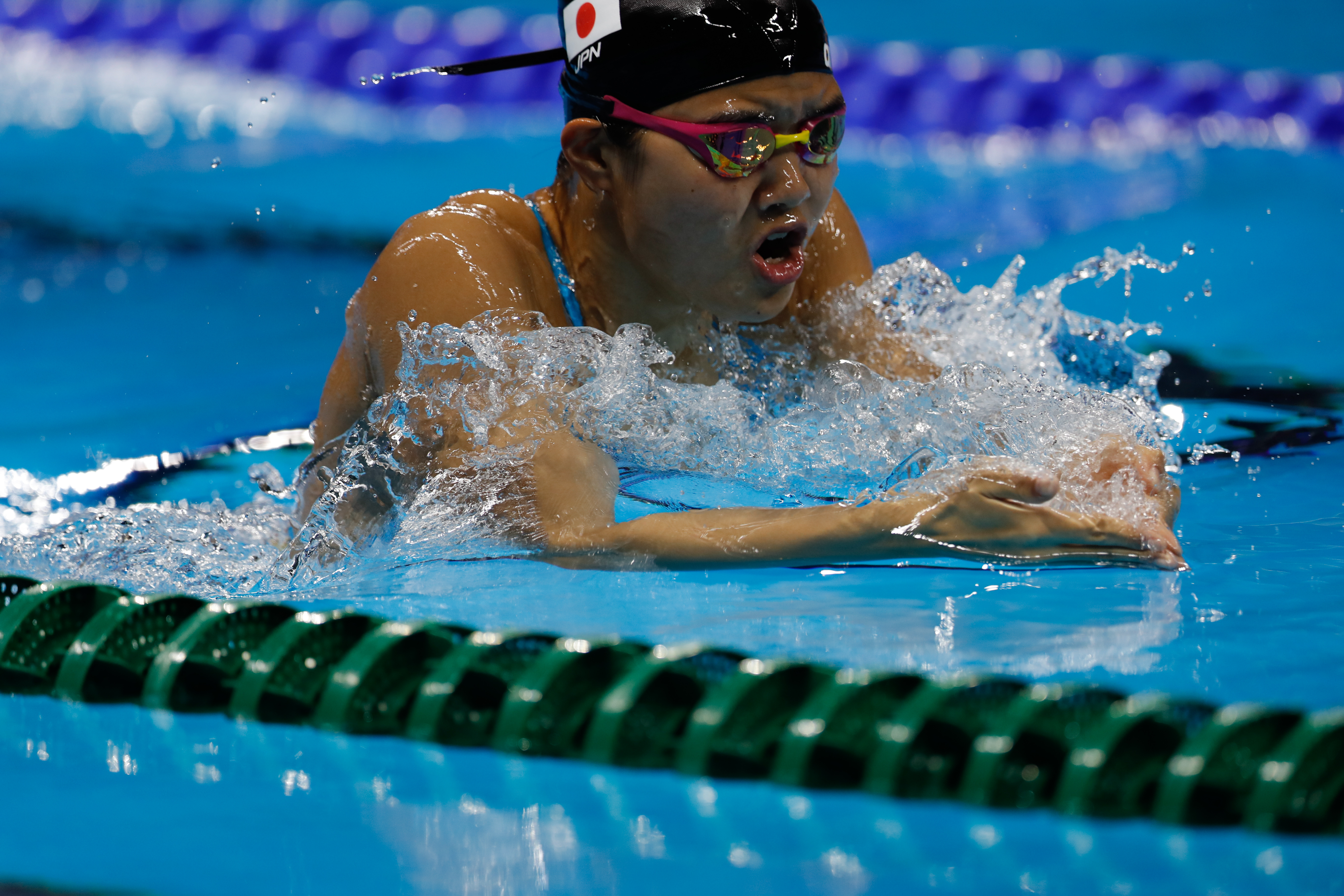
- Suzuka Hasegawa in 2016

Personal information
- Born: 25 January 2000 (age 26)

Sport
- Sport: Swimming
- Strokes: Butterfly, freestyle
Medal record
Representing Japan
World Championships (SC)
Bronze medal – third place	2018 Hangzhou	200 m butterfly
Asian Games
Bronze medal – third place	2018 Jakarta	200 m butterfly
World Junior Championships
Silver medal – second place	2017 Indianapolis	200 m butterfly
Bronze medal – third place	2017 Indianapolis	100 m butterfly
Bronze medal – third place	2017 Indianapolis	4×200 m freestyle
Junior Pan Pacific Championships
Gold medal – first place	2014 Maui	100 m butterfly
Silver medal – second place	2014 Maui	4×100 m medley

Suzuka Hasegawa (長谷川 涼香, Hasegawa Suzuka; born 25 January 2000) is a Japanese swimmer. She competed in the women's 200 metre butterfly event at the 2016 Summer Olympics. In April 2017, Hasegawa broke the world junior record in the 200 butterfly with a 2:02.96 at Japanese Nationals. She qualified to represent Japan at the 2020 Summer Olympics.

When she was 14 years old, Hasegawa competed at the 2014 Junior Pan Pacific Swimming Championships in Hawaii, United States, where she won the gold medal in the 100 metre butterfly with a time of 58.91 seconds, which was 0.23 seconds slower than the Championships record of 58.68 seconds set in 2012 by Noemie Thomas of Canada, as well as a silver medal in the 4×100 metre medley relay with a final relay time of 4:04.11.
