= Zhang Yufei (swimmer) =

Chinese swimmer (born 1998)

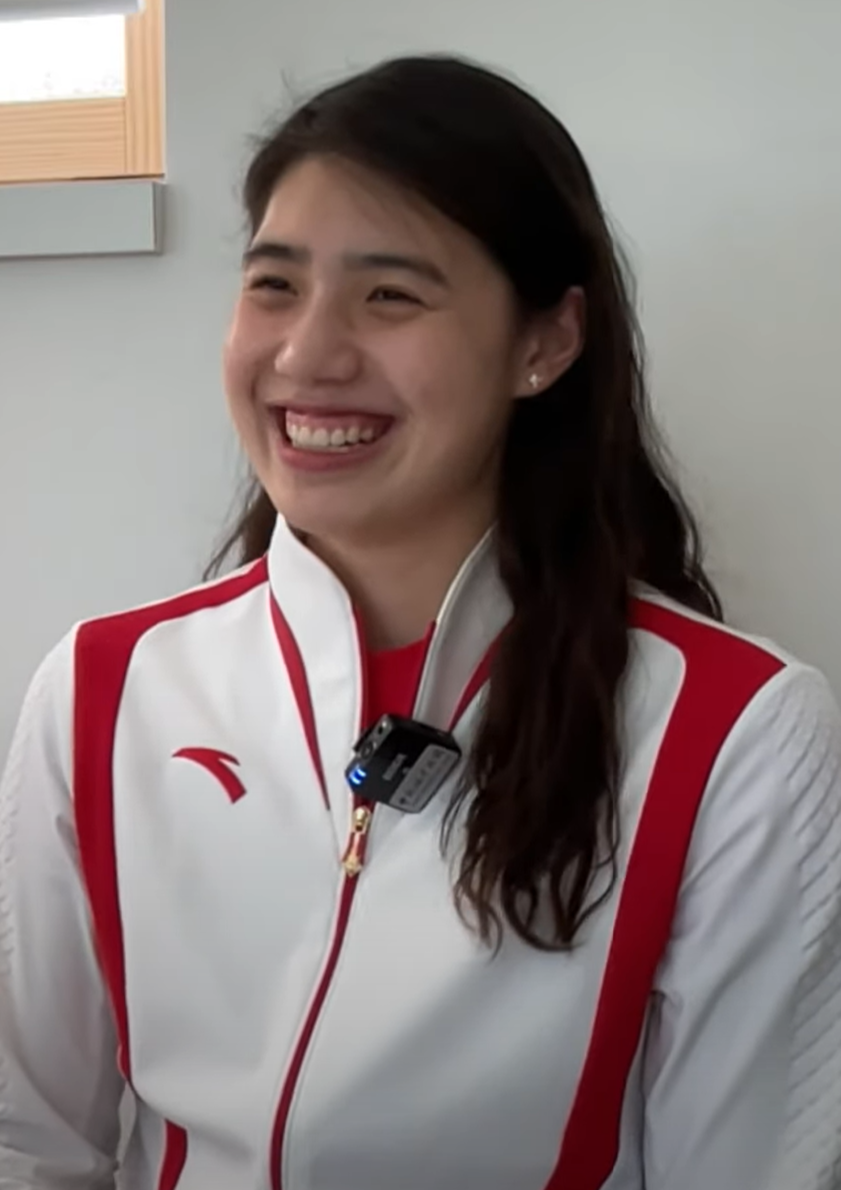
- Zhang in 2024

Personal information
- National team: China
- Born: 19 April 1998 (age 28) Xuzhou, Jiangsu, China
- Height: 1.76 m (5 ft 9 in)
- Weight: 62 kg (137 lb)

Sport
- Sport: Swimming
- Strokes: Freestyle, butterfly
- Club: Jiangsu Swimming Team
- Coach: Cui Dengrong
Medal record
Women's swimming
Representing China
Event	1st	2nd	3rd
Olympic Games	2	3	5
World Championships (LC)	2	2	9
World Championships (SC)	1	1	4
Asian Games	13	2	0
Summer Youth Olympics	4	2	0
Total	22	10	18
Women's swimming
Representing China
Olympic Games
Gold medal – first place	2020 Tokyo	200 m butterfly
Gold medal – first place	2020 Tokyo	4×200 m freestyle
Silver medal – second place	2020 Tokyo	100 m butterfly
Silver medal – second place	2020 Tokyo	4×100 m mixed medley
Silver medal – second place	2024 Paris	4×100 m mixed medley
Bronze medal – third place	2024 Paris	50 m freestyle
Bronze medal – third place	2024 Paris	100 m butterfly
Bronze medal – third place	2024 Paris	200 m butterfly
Bronze medal – third place	2024 Paris	4×100 m freestyle
Bronze medal – third place	2024 Paris	4x100 m medley
World Championships (LC)
Gold medal – first place	2023 Fukuoka	100 m butterfly
Gold medal – first place	2023 Fukuoka	4×100 m mixed medley
Silver medal – second place	2023 Fukuoka	50 m butterfly
Silver medal – second place	2025 Singapore	4×100 m mixed medley
Bronze medal – third place	2015 Kazan	200 m butterfly
Bronze medal – third place	2015 Kazan	4×200 m freestyle
Bronze medal – third place	2017 Budapest	4×100 m mixed medley
Bronze medal – third place	2022 Budapest	50 m butterfly
Bronze medal – third place	2022 Budapest	100 m butterfly
Bronze medal – third place	2022 Budapest	200 m butterfly
Bronze medal – third place	2023 Fukuoka	50 m freestyle
Bronze medal – third place	2023 Fukuoka	4×100 m freestyle
Bronze medal – third place	2025 Singapore	4×100 m medley
World Championships (SC)
Gold medal – first place	2021 Abu Dhabi	200 m butterfly
Silver medal – second place	2018 Hangzhou	4×100 m medley
Bronze medal – third place	2014 Doha	400 m freestyle
Bronze medal – third place	2016 Windsor	200 m butterfly
Bronze medal – third place	2021 Abu Dhabi	4 x 100 m medley
Bronze medal – third place	2022 Melbourne	50 m butterfly
Asian Games
Gold medal – first place	2014 Incheon	4×100 m freestyle
Gold medal – first place	2018 Jakarta	200 m butterfly
Gold medal – first place	2018 Jakarta	4×100 m mixed medley
Gold medal – first place	2022 Hangzhou	50 m freestyle
Gold medal – first place	2022 Hangzhou	50 m butterfly
Gold medal – first place	2022 Hangzhou	100 m butterfly
Gold medal – first place	2022 Hangzhou	200 m butterfly
Gold medal – first place	2022 Hangzhou	4×100 m freestyle
Gold medal – first place	2022 Hangzhou	4×100 m mixed medley
Gold medal – first place	2026 Aichi–Nagoya	50 m butterfly
Gold medal – first place	2026 Aichi–Nagoya	4×100 m freestyle
Gold medal – first place	2026 Aichi–Nagoya	4×100 m medley
Gold medal – first place	2026 Aichi–Nagoya	4×100 m mixed medley
Silver medal – second place	2018 Jakarta	100 m butterfly
Silver medal – second place	2026 Aichi–Nagoya	100 m butterfly
Asian Championships
Silver medal – second place	2016 Tokyo	200 m butterfly
Silver medal – second place	2016 Tokyo	4x100 m medley
Summer Youth Olympics
Gold medal – first place	2014 Nanjing	4×100 m freestyle
Gold medal – first place	2014 Nanjing	4×100 m medley
Gold medal – first place	2014 Nanjing	4×100 m mixed freestyle
Gold medal – first place	2014 Nanjing	4×100 m mixed medley
Silver medal – second place	2014 Nanjing	100 m butterfly
Silver medal – second place	2014 Nanjing	200 m butterfly
World University Games
Gold medal – first place	2021 Chengdu	50 m freestyle
Gold medal – first place	2021 Chengdu	100 m freestyle
Gold medal – first place	2021 Chengdu	50 m butterfly
Gold medal – first place	2021 Chengdu	100 m butterfly
Gold medal – first place	2021 Chengdu	4×100 m freestyle
Gold medal – first place	2021 Chengdu	4×200 m freestyle
Gold medal – first place	2021 Chengdu	4×100 m medley
Gold medal – first place	2021 Chengdu	4×100 m mixed freestyle
Gold medal – first place	2021 Chengdu	4×100 m mixed medley
Military World Games
Gold medal – first place	2019 Wuhan	100 m butterfly
Gold medal – first place	2019 Wuhan	4×100 m freestyle
Gold medal – first place	2019 Wuhan	4×200 m freestyle
Gold medal – first place	2019 Wuhan	4×100 m medley
Gold medal – first place	2019 Wuhan	4×100 m mixed medley
Silver medal – second place	2019 Wuhan	50 m butterfly
Bronze medal – third place	2019 Wuhan	50 m freestyle
Bronze medal – third place	2019 Wuhan	200 m butterfly

Zhang Yufei (Chinese: 张雨霏; pinyin: Zhāng Yǔfēi; born 19 April 1998) is a Chinese competitive swimmer who specializes in sprint freestyle and butterfly events. Considered one of the most promising swimming in the international scene, she produced a tally of forty-three medals (eighteen gold medals, eight silver medals, and seventeen bronze medals) in her swimming career, spanning the Youth Olympics, Asian Games, World Championships and the Summer Olympics. She currently holds the record for most Olympic medals for a Chinese athlete. In 2023, she was named as the most valuable player in the women's division, in the 2022 Asian Games in Hangzhou.

== Career ==
Born in Xuzhou (Jiangsu), Zhang began swimming at the age of four partly because of the encouragement and influence of her mother, who acted as her personal coach. Two years later, she started training professionally as a member of the Jiangsu Swimming Team, and eventually held numerous records for her age group. As more records followed, Zhang's rapid improvement culminated on her major debut in an international sporting event at the age of fourteen, when she beat 2008 Olympic champion Liu Zige for the gold medal in the 200 m butterfly at the 2012 FINA World Cup meet in Beijing. The following year, she was selected for China's national swimming team.

Zhang's international debut came as a member of the host nation China at the 2014 Summer Youth Olympics in Nanjing, where she achieved a total of five medals: three golds and two silver. Zhang started off the competition with a powerful butterfly split of 58.56 in the girls' 4 × 100 m medley relay that tremendously helped her Chinese foursome break the junior world record (4:03.58) for the gold medal. On the same night, she managed a strong swim to take the silver in the 200 m butterfly with a time of 2:08.22, finishing farther behind Hungary's Liliána Szilágyi by less than two seconds. In the girls' 4 × 100 m freestyle relay, Zhang posted a third leg split in 54.09 until her host nation's foursome celebrated again with another relay victory in 3:41.19. On 22 August, Zhang relegated to her second silver in the 100 m butterfly at 57.95, narrowly losing the race again to Szilagyi by almost three tenths of a second. Despite missing out her first individual gold, Zhang and her teammates Li Guangyuan, He Yun, and Yu Hexin powered their stretch to grab another relay title for the Chinese squad in the mixed 4 × 100 m medley (3:49.33).

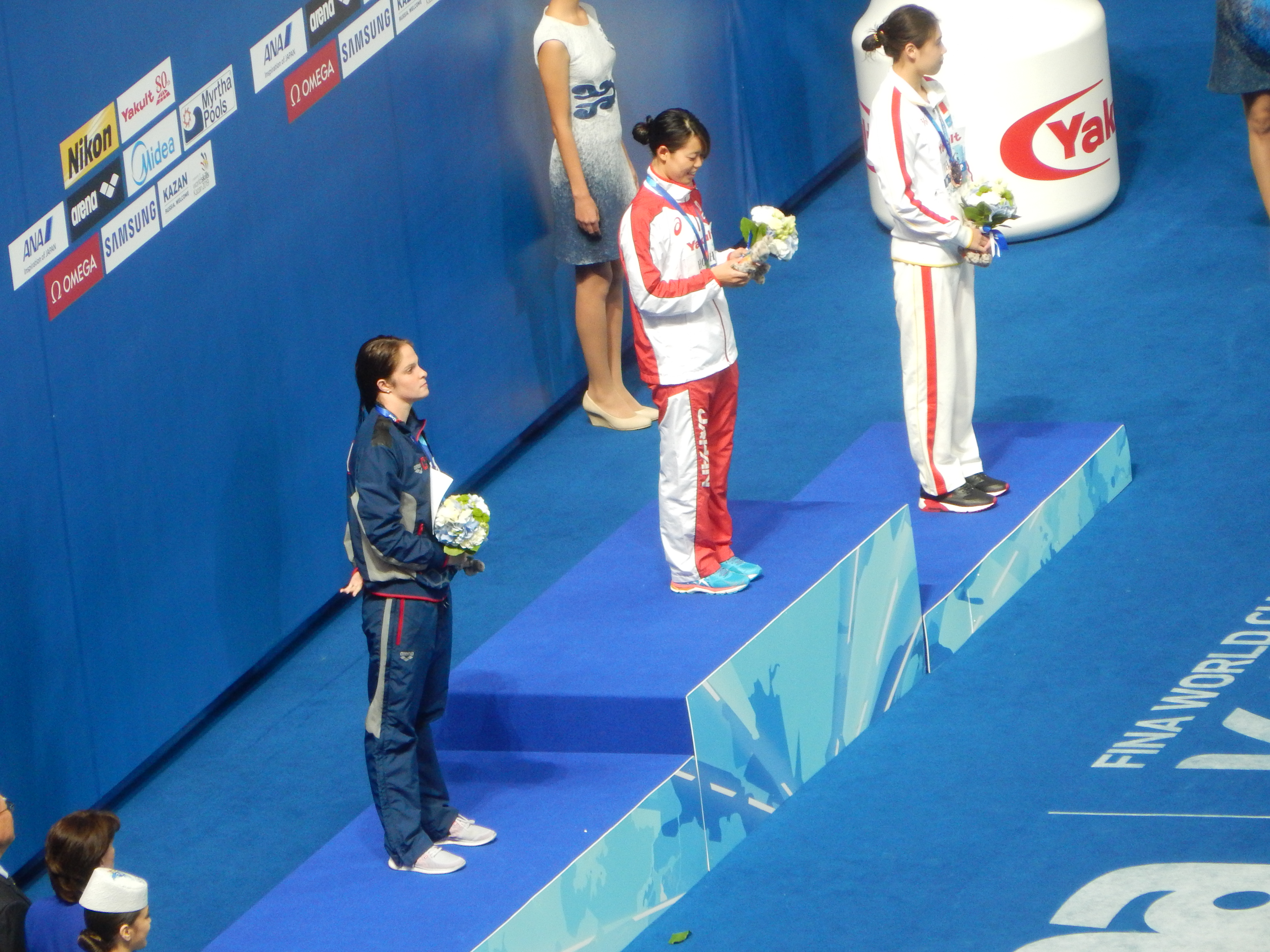
Zhang (right) at the 2015 World Aquatics Championships

One month later, at the 2014 Asian Games in Incheon, South Korea, Zhang set a 54.10 split on the third leg to put the Chinese squad ahead to a marvelous victory in the women's 4 × 100 m freestyle relay, with a time of 3:37.25.

At the 2015 FINA World Championships in Kazan, Russia, Zhang swam her two finals on the fifth night of the competition with forty minutes in between. First, she lowered her own junior world record with 2:06.51 to take home her individual bronze in the 200 m butterfly. Forty minutes later, Zhang set a third leg split of 1:58.73 to deliver the Chinese foursome a bronze medal in the women's 4 × 200 m freestyle relay with a combined time of 7:49.10.

On 22 August 2018, Zhang won the Women's 200 m butterfly gold medal at the 18th Asian Games in Jakarta, Indonesia with 2:06.61.

On 25 July 2021, Zhang went 55.64 to win silver in the Women's 100 m butterfly at the 2020 Tokyo Olympics behind Maggie Macneil, who went 55.59.

On 28 July 2021, Zhang broke the Olympic record and the world record in the Women's 200 m butterfly and the Women's 4 × 200 m freestyle relay respectively, winning the gold medals in both events.

On 24 July 2023, Zhang won the women's 100 m butterfly gold medal at the 2023 Fukuoka World Aquatics Championships.

At the 19th Asian Games in Hangzhou, Zhang topped the podium in the women's individual 50 m freestyle, 50 m butterfly, 100 m butterfly and 200 m butterfly, while also contributing to her national women's 4 × 100 m freestyle relay and mixed 4 × 100 m medley relay gold medals, securing 6 golds in all.

At the 2024 Paris Olympics, Zhang Yufei's 55.64 butterfly-leg swim in the Mixed 4 × 100 m Medley Relay event helped her team beat the previous world record time of 3:37.58 set by Great Britain in the event at the Tokyo Olympics with a time of 3:37.55, however the U.S. swim team achieved an even-faster new world record time of 3:37.43 and beat Zhang and her team for the gold medal in the event. Zhang Yufei topped the list of most medals won by a competing swimmer in the 2024 Paris Olympic Games with a total count of 6 medals (5 bronze & 1 silver).

== International championships (50 m) ==
Meet	50 free	50 fly	100 fly	200 fly	4×100 free	4×200 free	4×100 medley	4×100 mixed medley
AG 2014					1st place, gold medalist(s)			
WC 2015				3rd place, bronze medalist(s)		3rd place, bronze medalist(s)		
OG 2016				6th				
WC 2017		17th	8th	5th	6th		6th	3rd place, bronze medalist(s)
AG 2018			2nd place, silver medalist(s)	1st place, gold medalist(s)			DSQ	1st place, gold medalist(s)
WC 2019		12th	13th	26th			5th	
OG 2020	WD		2nd place, silver medalist(s)	1st place, gold medalist(s)		1st place, gold medalist(s)	4th	2nd place, silver medalist(s)
WC 2022	5th	3rd place, bronze medalist(s)	3rd place, bronze medalist(s)	3rd place, bronze medalist(s)	4th		6th	6th
WC 2023	3rd place, bronze medalist(s)	2nd place, silver medalist(s)	1st place, gold medalist(s)	DNS	3rd place, bronze medalist(s)		4th	1st place, gold medalist(s)
AG 2022	1st place, gold medalist(s)	1st place, gold medalist(s)	1st place, gold medalist(s)	1st place, gold medalist(s)	1st place, gold medalist(s)			1st place, gold medalist(s)
OG 2024	3rd place, bronze medalist(s)		3rd place, bronze medalist(s)	3rd place, bronze medalist(s)	3rd place, bronze medalist(s)		3rd place, bronze medalist(s)	2nd place, silver medalist(s)
WC 2025			4th				3rd place, bronze medalist(s)	2nd place, silver medalist(s)

== International championships (25 m) ==
Meet	400 free	50 fly	100 fly	200 fly	4×50 free	4×100 free	4×100 medley	4×50 mixed medley
SCW 2014	3rd place, bronze medalist(s)			4th		5th	10th	
SCW 2016				3rd place, bronze medalist(s)			5th	4th
SCW 2018		17th	WD	7th			2nd place, silver medalist(s)	11th
SCW 2021		5th	WD	1st place, gold medalist(s)	4th	5th	3rd place, bronze medalist(s)	
SCW 2022		3rd place, bronze medalist(s)	DNS		5th			5th

== Personal bests ==
As of July 30, 2023

=== Long course (50-meter pool) ===
Event	Time	Meet	Date	Note(s)
50 m freestyle	24.15	2023 World Aquatics Championships	July 30, 2023	
100 m freestyle	52.90	2020 Chinese National Swimming Championships; 2021 Chinese National Swimming Championships	September 27, 2020; May 4, 2021	
200 m freestyle	1.57.22	2021 Chinese National Swimming Championships	May 2, 2021	
400 m freestyle	4.07.72	2015 Chinese National Swimming Championships	April 9, 2015	
800 m freestyle	8.51.91	2012 Chinese National Swimming Championships	September 22, 2012	
50 m butterfly	25.05	2023 World Aquatics Championships	July 29, 2023	AS,NR
100 m butterfly	55.62	2020 Chinese National Swimming Championships	September 29, 2020	AS,NR
200 m butterfly	2.03.86	2020 Summer Olympics	July 29, 2021	Former OR

=== Short course (25-meter pool) ===
Event	Time	Meet	Date	Note(s)
50 m freestyle	23.76	2022 World Championships	December 15, 2022	NR
100 m freestyle	53.21	2022 Chinese National Swimming Championships	October 29, 2022	
200 m freestyle	1.55.26	2016 World Cup	September 30, 2016	
400 m freestyle	3.59.51	2014 World Championships	December 5, 2014	
50 m butterfly	24.71	2022 World Championships	December 14, 2022	AS,NR
100 m butterfly	55.46	2022 Chinese National Swimming Championships	October 29, 2022	
200 m butterfly	2.03.01	2021 World Championships	December 17, 2021	
100 m individual medley	1.08.80	2017 World Cup	October 5, 2017	
400 m individual medley	4.46.30	2014 World Cup	October 25, 2014	

Key: NR = National Record; AS = Asian Record; OR = Olympic Record

== See also ==
- List of Youth Olympic Games gold medalists who won Olympic gold medals

Preceded by United States	Mixed 4 x 100-meter medley relay world record-holder 1 October 2020 – 31 July 2021	Succeeded by Great Britain
Preceded by Australia	4 × 200 metres freestyle relay world record-holder 29 July 2021 – 31 July 2022	Succeeded by Australia
