= Swimming at the 2016 European Aquatics Championships – Women's 50 metre butterfly =

Women's 50 metre butterfly at the 2016 European Aquatics Championships
- Dates: 16–17 May
- Competitors: 45 from 27 nations
- Winning time: 24.99

Medalists
gold medal	Sarah Sjöström	Sweden
silver medal	Jeanette Ottesen	Denmark
bronze medal	Francesca Halsall	Great Britain

The Women's 50 metre butterfly competition of the 2016 European Aquatics Championships was held on 16 and 17 May 2016.

== Records ==
Prior to the competition, the existing world, European and championship records were as follows.

	Name	Nation	Time	Location	Date
World record	Sarah Sjöström	Sweden	24.43	Borås	5 July 2014
European record	Sarah Sjöström	Sweden	24.43	Borås	5 July 2014
Championship record	Sarah Sjöström	Sweden	24.87	Berlin	18 August 2014

== Results ==
=== Heats ===
The heats were held on 16 May at 10:28.

Rank	Heat	Lane	Name	Nationality	Time	Notes
1	5	4	Sarah Sjöström	Sweden	25.59	Q
2	4	4	Jeanette Ottesen	Denmark	25.80	Q
2	5	5	Ranomi Kromowidjojo	Netherlands	25.80	Q
4	3	4	Francesca Halsall	Great Britain	26.01	Q
5	5	6	Therese Alshammar	Sweden	26.05	Q
6	4	5	Maaike de Waard	Netherlands	26.32	Q
7	5	2	Nastja Govejšek	Slovenia	26.36	Q
8	3	5	Mélanie Henique	France	26.38	Q
9	3	6	Kimberly Buys	Belgium	26.41	Q
10	5	3	Anna Dowgiert	Poland	26.44	Q
11	3	3	Elena Gemo	Italy	26.46	Q
12	4	3	Emilie Beckmann	Denmark	26.47	Q
13	4	6	Silvia Di Pietro	Italy	26.52	Q
14	4	1	Lucie Svěcená	Czech Republic	26.65	Q
15	5	8	Kim Busch	Netherlands	26.66	
16	3	0	Bryndis Hansen	Iceland	26.68	Q
17	3	2	Anna Ntountounaki	Greece	26.74	Q
18	4	2	Marie Wattel	France	26.90	
19	2	4	Mimosa Jallow	Finland	26.92	
19	5	1	Darya Stepanyuk	Ukraine	26.92	
21	5	7	Kristel Vourna	Greece	26.95	
21	3	8	Amit Ivry	Israel	26.95	
23	3	9	Keren Siebner	Israel	26.96	
24	4	7	Sviatlana Khakhlova	Belarus	27.10	
25	2	5	Ilaria Bianchi	Italy	27.14	
26	2	2	Anna Kolářová	Czech Republic	27.19	
26	5	0	Katarína Listopadová	Slovakia	27.19	
28	4	8	Svenja Stoffel	Switzerland	27.30	
29	5	9	Emilia Pikkarainen	Finland	27.34	
30	2	8	Amina Kajtaz	Bosnia and Herzegovina	27.37	
30	2	1	Laura Stephens	Great Britain	27.37	
32	4	0	Barbora Mišendová	Slovakia	27.39	
33	2	3	Gabriela Ņikitina	Latvia	27.46	
34	3	7	Sasha Touretski	Switzerland	27.47	
35	1	5	Susann Bjoernsen	Norway	27.64	
36	1	4	Dobromira Ivanova	Bulgaria	27.72	
37	4	9	Fanny Teijonsalo	Finland	27.82	
38	2	6	Caroline Pilhatsch	Austria	27.83	
39	2	0	Lisa Katharina Hoepink	Germany	27.86	
40	2	7	Tessa Nurminen	Finland	27.90	
41	2	9	Gizem Bozkurt	Turkey	28.09	
42	1	3	Margaret Markvardt	Estonia	28.11	
43	1	6	Esra Kuebra Kacmaz	Turkey	28.30	
44	1	2	Nida Eliz Üstündağ	Turkey	28.55	
45	1	7	Ana-Maria Damjanovska	Macedonia	29.53	
	3	1	Anna Santamans	France	DNS	

=== Semifinals ===
The semifinals were held on 16 May at 18:11.

==== Semifinal 1 ====
Rank	Lane	Name	Nationality	Time	Notes
1	5	Francesca Halsall	Great Britain	25.35	Q
2	4	Jeanette Ottesen	Denmark	25.70	Q
3	3	Maaike de Waard	Netherlands	26.05	Q
4	2	Anna Dowgiert	Poland	26.10	Q
5	6	Mélanie Henique	France	26.14	Q
6	7	Emilie Beckmann	Denmark	26.40	
7	1	Lucie Svěcená	Czech Republic	26.49	
8	8	Anna Ntountounaki	Greece	26.75	

==== Semifinal 2 ====
Rank	Lane	Name	Nationality	Time	Notes
1	4	Sarah Sjöström	Sweden	25.42	Q
2	5	Ranomi Kromowidjojo	Netherlands	25.63	Q
3	3	Therese Alshammar	Sweden	25.98	Q
4	1	Silvia Di Pietro	Italy	26.31	
5	6	Nastja Govejšek	Slovenia	26.35	
6	2	Kimberly Buys	Belgium	26.36	
7	7	Elena Gemo	Italy	26.44	
8	8	Bryndis Hansen	Iceland	26.71	

=== Final ===
The final was held on 17 May at 18:21.

Rank	Lane	Name	Nationality	Time	Notes
1st place, gold medalist(s)	5	Sarah Sjöström	Sweden	24.99	
2nd place, silver medalist(s)	6	Jeanette Ottesen	Denmark	25.44	
3rd place, bronze medalist(s)	4	Francesca Halsall	Great Britain	25.48	
4	3	Ranomi Kromowidjojo	Netherlands	25.82	
5	2	Therese Alshammar	Sweden	26.01	
6	8	Mélanie Henique	France	26.12	
7	7	Maaike de Waard	Netherlands	26.18	
8	1	Anna Dowgiert	Poland	26.22	
