= Swimming at the 2016 European Aquatics Championships – Women's 100 metre butterfly =

Women's 100 metre butterfly at the 2016 European Aquatics Championships
- Dates: 19 May
- Competitors: 37 from 26 nations
- Winning time: 55.89

Medalists
gold medal	Sarah Sjöström	Sweden
silver medal	Jeanette Ottesen	Denmark
bronze medal	Ilaria Bianchi	Italy

The Women's 100 metre butterfly competition of the 2016 European Aquatics Championships was held on 19 May 2016.

== Records ==
Prior to the competition, the existing world, European and championship records were as follows.

	Name	Nation	Time	Location	Date
World record	Sarah Sjöström	Sweden	55.64	Kazan	3 August 2015
European record	Sarah Sjöström	Sweden	55.64	Kazan	3 August 2015
Championship record	Jeanette Ottesen	Denmark	56.51	Berlin	22 August 2014

== Results ==
=== Heats ===
The heats were held on 19 May at 10:41.

Rank	Heat	Lane	Name	Nationality	Time	Notes
1	5	4	Sarah Sjöström	Sweden	57.20	Q
2	4	4	Jeanette Ottesen	Denmark	57.86	Q
3	3	3	Ilaria Bianchi	Italy	58.34	Q
4	5	3	Kimberly Buys	Belgium	58.47	Q
5	5	6	Liliána Szilágyi	Hungary	58.55	Q
6	4	5	Anna Ntountounaki	Greece	58.62	Q
7	3	3	Lucie Svěcená	Czech Republic	58.83	Q
8	4	3	Katarína Listopadová	Slovakia	58.99	Q
9	5	1	Danielle Villars	Switzerland	59.05	Q
10	3	5	Marie Wattel	France	59.15	Q
11	4	6	Silvia Di Pietro	Italy	59.16	Q
12	4	7	Emilie Beckmann	Denmark	59.26	Q
13	3	1	Laura Stephens	Great Britain	59.27	Q
14	4	1	Judit Ignacio Sorribes	Spain	59.56	Q
15	3	6	Kristel Vourna	Greece	59.63	Q
16	1	3	Darya Stepanyuk	Ukraine	59.83	Q
17	5	5	Louise Hansson	Sweden	59.85	
18	3	7	Keren Siebner	Israel	59.96	
19	5	8	Amit Ivry	Israel	1:00.15	
20	3	2	Emilia Pikkarainen	Finland	1:00.17	
21	4	2	Svenja Stoffel	Switzerland	1:00.20	
22	5	0	Nastja Govejšek	Slovenia	1:00.31	
23	2	3	Bryndis Hansen	Iceland	1:00.33	
24	4	0	Barbora Mišendová	Slovakia	1:00.45	
25	2	5	Lisa Höpink	Germany	1:00.49	
26	2	6	Kim Busch	Netherlands	1:00.64	
27	2	2	Ana Monteiro	Portugal	1:00.65	
28	2	8	Nida Üstündağ	Turkey	1:00.74	
29	5	9	Dobromira Ivanova	Bulgaria	1:00.96	
30	2	0	Amina Kajtaz	Bosnia and Herzegovina	1:01.21	
31	4	8	Sasha Touretski	Switzerland	1:01.22	
32	4	9	Gizem Bozkurt	Turkey	1:01.25	
33	1	4	Margaret Markvardt	Estonia	1:01.40	
34	3	9	Julia Mrozinski	Germany	1:01.84	
35	2	4	Fanny Teijonsalo	Finland	1:02.14	
36	2	7	Alessia Polieri	Italy	1:02.92	
37	1	5	Noel Borshi	Albania	1:04.67	
	2	1	Tanja Kylliaeinen	Finland	DNS	
	3	0	Birgit Koschischek	Austria	DNS	
	3	8	Maria Ugolkova	Switzerland	DNS	
	5	2	Katinka Hosszú	Hungary	DNS	
	5	7	Evelyn Verrasztó	Hungary	DNS	

=== Semifinals ===
The semifinals were held on 19 May at 18:30.

==== Semifinal 1 ====
Rank	Lane	Name	Nationality	Time	Notes
1	4	Jeanette Ottesen	Denmark	57.38	Q
2	3	Anna Ntountounaki	Greece	58.58	Q
3	5	Kimberly Buys	Belgium	58.71	Q
4	1	Judit Ignacio Sorribes	Spain	58.73	Q
5	6	Katarína Listopadová	Slovakia	58.90	
6	7	Emilie Beckmann	Denmark	59.07	
7	2	Marie Wattel	France	59.27	
8	8	Darya Stepanyuk	Ukraine	59.67	

==== Semifinal 2 ====
Rank	Lane	Name	Nationality	Time	Notes
1	4	Sarah Sjöström	Sweden	56.12	Q, CR
2	5	Ilaria Bianchi	Italy	57.47	Q
3	3	Liliána Szilágyi	Hungary	57.83	Q
4	6	Lucie Svěcená	Czech Republic	58.71	Q
5	1	Laura Stephens	Great Britain	58.84	
6	7	Silvia Di Pietro	Italy	58.99	
7	8	Kristel Vourna	Greece	59.19	
8	2	Danielle Villars	Switzerland	59.26	

=== Final ===
The final was held on 20 May at 19:18.

Rank	Lane	Name	Nationality	Time	Notes
1st place, gold medalist(s)	4	Sarah Sjöström	Sweden	55.89	CR
2nd place, silver medalist(s)	5	Jeanette Ottesen	Denmark	56.83	
3rd place, bronze medalist(s)	3	Ilaria Bianchi	Italy	57.52	
4	6	Liliána Szilágyi	Hungary	57.54	
5	1	Kimberly Buys	Belgium	58.48	
6	2	Anna Ntountounaki	Greece	58.86	
7	8	Judit Ignacio Sorribes	Spain	59.02	
8	7	Lucie Svěcená	Czech Republic	59.06	
