= Swimming at the 2018 European Aquatics Championships – Women's 100 metre butterfly =

Women's 100 metre butterfly at the 2018 European Aquatics Championships
- Venue: Tollcross International Swimming Centre
- Dates: 3 August (heats and semifinals); 4 August (final)
- Competitors: 37 from 24 nations
- Winning time: 56.13

Medalists
gold medal	Sarah Sjöström	Sweden
silver medal	Svetlana Chimrova	Russia
bronze medal	Elena Di Liddo	Italy

The Women's 100 metre butterfly competition of the 2018 European Aquatics Championships was held on 3 and 4 August 2018.

== Records ==
Prior to the competition, the existing world and championship records were as follows.

	Name	Nation	Time	Location	Date
World record European record	Sarah Sjöström	Sweden	55.48	Rio de Janeiro	7 August 2016
Championship record	Sarah Sjöström	Sweden	55.89	London	20 May 2016

== Results ==
=== Heats ===
The heats were started on 3 August at 10:36.

Rank	Heat	Lane	Name	Nationality	Time	Notes
1	4	4	Sarah Sjöström	Sweden	56.87	Q
2	2	4	Elena Di Liddo	Italy	57.91	Q
3	3	5	Ilaria Bianchi	Italy	57.92	Q
4	2	3	Kimberly Buys	Belgium	58.23	Q
5	3	4	Svetlana Chimrova	Russia	58.24	Q
6	4	5	Marie Wattel	France	58.47	Q
7	3	6	Louise Hansson	Sweden	58.52	Q
8	2	6	Anna Ntountounaki	Greece	58.65	Q
9	3	7	Emilie Beckmann	Denmark	58.69	Q
10	4	3	Aliena Schmidtke	Germany	58.89	Q
11	4	6	Alys Thomas	Great Britain	58.93	Q
12	2	5	Liliána Szilágyi	Hungary	58.95	Q
13	4	7	Kinge Zandringa	Netherlands	59.00	Q
14	3	2	Claudia Tarzia	Italy	59.54	
15	2	8	Ana Catarina Monteiro	Portugal	59.63	Q
16	4	0	Amina Kajtaz	Bosnia and Herzegovina	59.65	Q
17	3	3	Charlotte Atkinson	Great Britain	59.66	Q
18	2	1	Evelyn Verrasztó	Hungary	59.94	
19	2	7	Amit Ivry	Israel	1:00.00	
20	4	2	Emily Large	Great Britain	1:00.01	
21	3	1	Lucie Svěcená	Czech Republic	1:00.02	
22	3	8	Emilie Løvberg	Norway	1:00.06	
23	4	8	Svenja Stoffel	Switzerland	1:00.46	
24	1	5	Nida Eliz Üstündağ	Turkey	1:00.61	
25	2	2	Sara Junevik	Sweden	1:00.63	
26	1	4	Zehra Duru Bilgin	Turkey	1:00.65	
27	1	7	Dalma Sebestyén	Hungary	1:00.80	
28	4	1	Polina Egorova	Russia	1:00.90	
29	3	9	Anastasiya Kuliashova	Belarus	1:01.56	
30	1	3	İmge Erdemli	Turkey	1:02.12	
31	1	2	Margaret Markvardt	Estonia	1:02.15	
32	2	9	Claudia Hufnagl	Austria	1:02.36	
33	2	0	Aleyna Özkan	Turkey	1:02.82	
34	1	6	Gerda Pak	Estonia	1:03.27	
35	1	0	Leoni Richter	Switzerland	1:03.47	
36	4	9	Alexandra Schegoleva	Cyprus	1:03.53	
37	1	8	Beatrice Felici	San Marino	1:07.42	
—	1	9	Alsu Bayramova	Azerbaijan	Did not start	

=== Semifinals ===
The semifinals were held on 3 August at 17:32.

==== Semifinal 1 ====
Rank	Lane	Name	Nationality	Time	Notes
1	4	Elena Di Liddo	Italy	57.82	Q
2	6	Anna Ntountounaki	Greece	58.34	Q
3	2	Aliena Schmidtke	Germany	58.42	Q
4	3	Marie Wattel	France	58.52	
5	7	Liliána Szilágyi	Hungary	58.53	
6	5	Kimberly Buys	Belgium	58.99	
7	8	Charlotte Atkinson	Great Britain	59.36	
8	1	Ana Catarina Monteiro	Portugal	59.44	

==== Semifinal 2 ====
Rank	Lane	Name	Nationality	Time	Notes
1	4	Sarah Sjöström	Sweden	56.66	Q
2	3	Svetlana Chimrova	Russia	57.54	Q
3	5	Ilaria Bianchi	Italy	57.79	Q
4	6	Louise Hansson	Sweden	57.99	Q
5	2	Emilie Beckmann	Denmark	58.40	Q
6	7	Alys Thomas	Great Britain	58.44	
7	1	Kinge Zandringa	Netherlands	58.64	
8	8	Amina Kajtaz	Bosnia and Herzegovina	59.54	NR

=== Final ===
The final was held on 4 August at 17:18.

Rank	Lane	Name	Nationality	Time	Notes
1st place, gold medalist(s)	4	Sarah Sjöström	Sweden	56.23	
2nd place, silver medalist(s)	5	Svetlana Chimrova	Russia	57.40	
3rd place, bronze medalist(s)	6	Elena Di Liddo	Italy	57.68	
4	3	Ilaria Bianchi	Italy	57.72	
5	7	Anna Ntountounaki	Greece	57.77	NR
6	2	Louise Hansson	Sweden	57.99	
7	1	Emilie Beckmann	Denmark	58.45	
8	8	Aliena Schmidtke	Germany	58.90	
