= Swimming at the 2020 European Aquatics Championships – Women's 50 metre butterfly =

Women's 50 metre butterfly at the 2020 European Aquatics Championships
- Venue: Danube Arena
- Dates: 22 May 2021 (heats and semifinals); 23 May 2021 (final)
- Competitors: 49 from 26 nations
- Winning time: 25.30

Medalists
gold medal	Ranomi Kromowidjojo	Netherlands
silver medal	Mélanie Henique	France
bronze medal	Emilie Beckmann	Denmark

The Women's 50 metre butterfly competition of the 2020 European Aquatics Championships was held on 22 and 23 May 2021.

== Records ==
Prior to the competition, the existing world and championship records were as follows.

	Name	Nation	Time	Location	Date
World record European record	Sarah Sjöström	Sweden	24.43	Borås	5 July 2014
Championship record	Sarah Sjöström	Sweden	24.87	Berlin	18 August 2014

== Results ==
=== Heats ===
The heats were started on 22 May 2021 at 10:27.

Rank	Heat	Lane	Name	Nationality	Time	Notes
1	6	4	Mélanie Henique	France	25.30	Q
2	5	4	Ranomi Kromowidjojo	Netherlands	25.88	Q
3	4	5	Jeanette Ottesen	Denmark	25.91	Q
4	4	4	Emilie Beckmann	Denmark	25.96	Q
4	5	5	Arina Surkova	Russia	25.96	Q
6	5	1	Sara Junevik	Sweden	25.99	Q
7	4	3	Maaike de Waard	Netherlands	26.11	Q
8	5	3	Louise Hansson	Sweden	26.20	Q
9	6	6	Elena Di Liddo	Italy	26.28	Q
10	4	2	Anastasiya Kuliashova	Belarus	26.31	Q
11	5	6	Kim Busch	Netherlands	26.32	
12	6	5	Marie Wattel	France	26.35	Q
13	6	3	Anastasiya Shkurdai	Belarus	26.41	Q
14	6	2	Anna Ntountounaki	Greece	26.46	Q
15	6	1	Silvia Di Pietro	Italy	26.57	Q, WD
16	5	2	Svetlana Chimrova	Russia	26.59	Q
17	1	3	Katarzyna Wasick	Poland	26.61	Q, WD
18	3	5	Harriet Jones	Great Britain	26.63	Q
19	6	7	Beatrix Bordás	Hungary	26.65	Q
19	3	2	Gabriela Ņikitina	Latvia	26.65	Q, NR
21	4	6	Michelle Coleman	Sweden	26.68	
22	5	8	Neža Klančar	Slovenia	26.69	
22	3	3	Dominika Varga	Hungary	26.69	
24	5	9	Mónika Ollé	Hungary	26.70	
25	4	1	Ida Liljeqvist	Sweden	26.73	
26	6	8	Ilaria Bianchi	Italy	26.79	
27	4	0	Costanza Cocconcelli	Italy	26.90	
28	3	4	Laura Stephens	Great Britain	26.92	
29	4	7	Kimberly Buys	Belgium	26.93	
29	4	8	Jessica Felsner	Germany	26.93	
31	3	6	Anna Kolářová	Czech Republic	26.98	
32	5	7	Sasha Touretski	Switzerland	27.03	
33	3	0	Tamara Potocká	Slovakia	27.31	
34	4	9	Tessa Giele	Netherlands	27.41	
34	6	0	Roos Vanotterdijk	Belgium	27.41	
36	2	4	Aina Hierro	Spain	27.47	
37	3	1	Julia Ullmann	Switzerland	27.49	
38	2	1	Mariam Sheikhalizadehkhanghah	Azerbaijan	27.56	NR
38	3	7	Alina Vedehhova	Estonia	27.56	
40	3	9	Alba Guillamón	Spain	27.62	
41	2	7	Zora Ripková	Slovakia	27.78	
42	3	8	Ieva Maļuka	Latvia	27.87	
43	2	2	Jóhanna Guðmundsdóttir	Iceland	27.90	
44	2	0	Martina Cibulková	Slovakia	28.19	
45	2	5	Viktoriya Kostromina	Ukraine	28.28	
46	1	4	Nida Eliz Üstündağ	Turkey	28.35	
47	2	8	Claudia Hufnagl	Austria	28.63	
48	2	9	Defne Taçyıldız	Turkey	29.11	
49	1	5	Nicola Muscat	Malta	29.53	
	6	9	Kornelia Fiedkiewicz	Poland	Did not start	
	5	0	Mimosa Jallow	Finland	Did not start	
	2	3	Fanny Teijonsalo	Finland	Did not start	
	2	6	Panna Ugrai	Hungary	Did not start	

=== Semifinals ===
The semifinals were started on 22 May at 18:40.

==== Semifinal 1 ====
Rank	Lane	Name	Nationality	Time	Notes
1	4	Ranomi Kromowidjojo	Netherlands	25.71	Q
2	5	Arina Surkova	Russia	25.75	Q
3	3	Sara Junevik	Sweden	26.00	q
4	7	Anastasiya Shkurdai	Belarus	26.14	
5	6	Louise Hansson	Sweden	26.15	
6	2	Anastasiya Kuliashova	Belarus	26.27	
7	8	Harriet Jones	Great Britain	26.49	
8	1	Svetlana Chimrova	Russia	26.58	

==== Semifinal 2 ====
Rank	Lane	Name	Nationality	Time	Notes
1	4	Mélanie Henique	France	25.53	Q
2	3	Emilie Beckmann	Denmark	25.64	Q
3	6	Maaike de Waard	Netherlands	25.81	q
3	5	Jeanette Ottesen	Denmark	25.81	q
5	1	Anna Ntountounaki	Greece	25.93	q, NR
6	7	Marie Wattel	France	26.07	
7	2	Elena Di Liddo	Italy	26.23	
8	8	Beatrix Bordás	Hungary	26.69	
9	9	Gabriela Ņikitina	Latvia	26.88	

=== Final ===
The final was held on 23 May at 18:00.

Rank	Lane	Name	Nationality	Time	Notes
1st place, gold medalist(s)	3	Ranomi Kromowidjojo	Netherlands	25.30	
2nd place, silver medalist(s)	4	Mélanie Henique	France	25.46	
3rd place, bronze medalist(s)	5	Emilie Beckmann	Denmark	25.59	
4	1	Anna Ntountounaki	Greece	25.65	NR
5	2	Maaike de Waard	Netherlands	25.76	
6	8	Sara Junevik	Sweden	25.84	
7	7	Jeanette Ottesen	Denmark	25.85	
8	6	Arina Surkova	Russia	25.87	
