= Swimming at the 2014 European Aquatics Championships – Women's 50 metre butterfly =

Women's 50 metre butterfly at the Swimming at the 2014 European Aquatics Championships
- Dates: 18–19 August
- Competitors: 38 from 23 nations
- Winning time: 24.98

Medalists
gold medal	Sarah Sjöström	Sweden
silver medal	Jeanette Ottesen	Denmark
bronze medal	Francesca Halsall	Great Britain

The Women's 50 metre butterfly competition of the 2014 European Aquatics Championships was held on 18–19 August.

== Records ==
Prior to the competition, the existing world, European and championship records were as follows.

	Name	Nation	Time	Location	Date
World record	Sarah Sjöström	Sweden	24.43	Borås	5 July 2014
European record	Sarah Sjöström	Sweden	24.43	Borås	5 July 2014
Championship record	Therese Alshammar	Sweden	25.50	Budapest	9 August 2010

== Results ==
=== Heats ===
The heats were held at 10:04.

Rank	Heat	Lane	Name	Nationality	Time	Notes
1	4	4	Sarah Sjöström	Sweden	25.12	Q, CR
2	2	4	Jeanette Ottesen	Denmark	25.64	Q
3	4	5	Inge Dekker	Netherlands	25.71	Q
4	3	4	Francesca Halsall	Great Britain	26.06	Q
5	3	6	Kimberly Buys	Belgium	26.10	Q
6	4	3	Silvia Di Pietro	Italy	26.13	Q
7	2	5	Therese Alshammar	Sweden	26.15	Q
8	2	3	Elena Gemo	Italy	26.28	Q
9	3	5	Mélanie Henique	France	26.36	Q
10	4	2	Marie Wattel	France	26.52	Q
11	4	1	Amit Ivry	Israel	26.54	Q
12	4	6	Anna Santamans	France	26.55	Q
13	2	2	Anna Dowgiert	Poland	26.60	Q
14	3	2	Aleksandra Urbanczyk	Poland	26.85	Q
15	3	3	Svetlana Chimrova	Russia	26.88	Q
16	2	6	Béryl Gastaldello	France	26.93	Q
17	3	8	Katarína Listopadová	Slovakia	26.95	
18	4	7	Ilaria Bianchi	Italy	27.01	
19	2	7	Sviatlana Khakhlova	Belarus	27.03	
20	2	1	Kristel Vourna	Greece	27.07	
21	3	7	Elena di Liddo	Italy	27.09	
22	3	1	Jemma Lowe	Great Britain	27.21	
23	4	0	Danielle Villars	Switzerland	27.23	
24	1	8	Darya Stepanyuk	Ukraine	27.27	
25	3	0	Lisa Zaiser	Austria	27.29	
26	2	0	Anna Kolárová	Czech Republic	27.52	
27	4	8	Maria Kameneva	Russia	27.54	
28	1	4	Keren Siebner	Israel	27.60	
29	3	9	Lyubov Korol	Ukraine	27.63	
30	1	5	Mimosa Jallow	Finland	27.65	
31	2	9	Johanna Silventoinen	Finland	27.67	
32	1	3	Tess Grossmann	Estonia	27.95	
33	1	2	Ingibjörg Jónsdóttir	Iceland	28.12	
34	2	8	Ezgi Yazici	Turkey	28.17	
35	1	7	Amina Kajtaz	Bosnia and Herzegovina	28.57	
36	4	9	Caroline Pilhatsch	Austria	28.80	
37	1	6	Katarina Simonović	Serbia	28.81	
38	1	1	Katharina Egger	Austria	29.05	

=== Semifinals ===
The semifinals were held at 18:14.

==== Semifinal 1 ====
Rank	Lane	Name	Nationality	Time	Notes
1	4	Jeanette Ottesen	Denmark	25.43	Q
2	5	Francesca Halsall	Great Britain	25.67	Q
3	3	Silvia Di Pietro	Italy	25.90	q
4	6	Elena Gemo	Italy	26.39	
5	1	Svetlana Chimrova	Russia	26.62	
6	2	Marie Wattel	France	26.68	
7	7	Anna Dowgiert	Poland	26.78	
8	8	Sviatlana Khakhlova	Belarus	26.99	

==== Semifinal 2 ====
Rank	Lane	Name	Nationality	Time	Notes
1	4	Sarah Sjöström	Sweden	24.87	Q, CR
2	5	Inge Dekker	Netherlands	25.84	Q
3	3	Kimberly Buys	Belgium	26.16	q
4	6	Therese Alshammar	Sweden	26.17	q
5	2	Mélanie Henique	France	26.31	q
6	7	Amit Ivry	Israel	26.39	
7	1	Aleksandra Urbanczyk	Poland	26.75	
8	8	Katarína Listopadová	Slovakia	26.83	

=== Swim-off ===
The Swim-off was held at 19:46.

Rank	Lane	Name	Nationality	Time	Notes
1	4	Amit Ivry	Israel	26.13	q
2	5	Elena Gemo	Italy	26.48	

=== Final ===
The final was held at 18:23.

Rank	Lane	Name	Nationality	Time	Notes
1st place, gold medalist(s)	4	Sarah Sjöström	Sweden	24.98	
2nd place, silver medalist(s)	5	Jeanette Ottesen	Denmark	25.34	
3rd place, bronze medalist(s)	3	Francesca Halsall	Great Britain	25.39	
4	6	Inge Dekker	Netherlands	25.75	
5	2	Silvia Di Pietro	Italy	25.78	
6	1	Therese Alshammar	Sweden	26.10	
7	8	Mélanie Henique	France	26.25	
8	7	Kimberly Buys	Belgium	26.29	
