= Swimming at the 2018 European Aquatics Championships – Women's 50 metre butterfly =

Women's 50 metre butterfly at the 2018 European Aquatics Championships
- Venue: Tollcross International Swimming Centre
- Dates: 8 August (heats and semifinals); 9 August (final)
- Competitors: 43 from 28 nations
- Winning time: 25.16

Medalists
| gold medal | Sarah Sjöström | Sweden |
| silver medal | Emilie Beckmann | Denmark |
| bronze medal | Kimberly Buys | Belgium |

The Women's 50 metre butterfly competition of the 2018 European Aquatics Championships was held on 8 and 9 August 2018 in Tollcross International Swimming Centre, Glasgow, Scotland.

== Records ==
Prior to the competition, the existing world and championship records were as follows.

| | Name | Nation | Time | Location | Date |
|---|---|---|---|---|---|
| World record European record | Sarah Sjöström | Sweden | 24.43 | Borås | 5 July 2014 |
| Championship record | Sarah Sjöström | Sweden | 24.87 | Berlin | 18 August 2014 |

== Results ==
=== Heats ===
The heats were started on 8 August at 09:26.

| Rank | Heat | Lane | Name | Nationality | Time | Notes |
|---|---|---|---|---|---|---|
| 1 | 5 | 4 | Sarah Sjöström | Sweden | 25.11 | Q |
| 2 | 3 | 5 | Emilie Beckmann | Denmark | 25.72 | Q |
| 3 | 4 | 5 | Kimberly Buys | Belgium | 25.80 | Q |
| 4 | 4 | 4 | Ranomi Kromowidjojo | Netherlands | 25.92 | Q |
| 5 | 3 | 4 | Melanie Henique | France | 25.94 | Q |
| 6 | 4 | 2 | Anna Dowgiert | Poland | 26.13 | Q |
| 7 | 3 | 3 | Elena Di Liddo | Italy | 26.28 | Q |
| 8 | 4 | 6 | Kim Busch | Netherlands | 26.38 | Q |
| 9 | 5 | 5 | Aliena Schmidtke | Germany | 26.41 | Q |
| 10 | 3 | 7 | Ilaria Bianchi | Italy | 26.47 | Q |
| 11 | 3 | 2 | Mimosa Jallow | Finland | 26.49 | Q |
| 12 | 3 | 6 | Louise Hansson | Sweden | 26.50 | QSO |
| 12 | 5 | 6 | Sara Junevik | Sweden | 26.50 | QSO |
| 14 | 5 | 2 | Anna Ntountounaki | Greece | 26.53 | Q |
| 15 | 2 | 7 | Julie Kepp Jensen | Denmark | 26.62 | Q |
| 16 | 5 | 9 | Alexandra Touretski | Switzerland | 26.77 | Q |
| 17 | 5 | 3 | Maaike de Waard | Netherlands | 26.82 | |
| 18 | 4 | 9 | Lucie Svěcená | Czech Republic | 26.91 | Q |
| 19 | 4 | 7 | Rozaliya Nasretdinova | Russia | 26.92 | |
| 20 | 3 | 1 | Kinge Zandringa | Netherlands | 27.02 | |
| 21 | 3 | 8 | Liliána Szilágyi | Hungary | 27.09 | |
| 22 | 4 | 1 | Anastasiya Kuliashova | Belarus | 27.15 | |
| 23 | 2 | 5 | Kertu Alnek | Estonia | 27.17 | |
| 24 | 4 | 8 | Ida Lindborg | Sweden | 27.20 | |
| 25 | 5 | 1 | Alys Thomas | Great Britain | 27.24 | |
| 26 | 5 | 7 | Amit Ivry | Israel | 27.30 | |
| 27 | 5 | 8 | Charlotte Atkinson | Great Britain | 27.48 | |
| 28 | 2 | 2 | Emilie Løvberg | Norway | 27.53 | |
| 29 | 2 | 3 | Amina Kajtaz | Bosnia and Herzegovina | 27.56 | |
| 30 | 2 | 8 | Caroline Pilhatsch | Austria | 27.72 | |
| 31 | 3 | 0 | Anna Kolářová | Czech Republic | 27.83 | |
| 32 | 4 | 0 | Svenja Stoffel | Switzerland | 27.84 | |
| 33 | 5 | 0 | Aleyna Özkan | Turkey | 27.91 | |
| 34 | 2 | 9 | Ieva Maļuka | Latvia | 27.98 | |
| 35 | 3 | 9 | Gabriela Ņikitina | Latvia | 28.10 | |
| 35 | 2 | 6 | Alexandra Schegoleva | Cyprus | 28.10 | |
| 37 | 1 | 5 | Beatrice Felici | San Marino | 28.27 | |
| 38 | 2 | 1 | Sezin Eliguel | Turkey | 28.46 | |
| 39 | 2 | 0 | Ana Catarina Monteiro | Portugal | 28.52 | |
| 40 | 1 | 4 | Claudia Hufnagl | Austria | 28.79 | |
| 41 | 1 | 3 | Nida Eliz Üstündağ | Turkey | 28.96 | |
| 42 | 1 | 6 | Ani Poghosyan | Armenia | 29.85 | |
| 43 | 1 | 2 | Tatiana Chișca | Moldova | 29.96 | |
| | 2 | 4 | Jenna Laukkanen | Finland | Did not start | |
| | 4 | 3 | Marie Wattel | France | Did not start | |

=== Swim-off ===
The swim-off was held on 8 August at 10:14.

| Rank | Lane | Name | Nationality | Time | Notes |
|---|---|---|---|---|---|
| 1 | 5 | Louise Hansson | Sweden | 26.11 | Q |
| 2 | 4 | Sara Junevik | Sweden | 26.36 | |

=== Semifinals ===
The semifinals were started on 8 August at 17:10.

==== Semifinal 1 ====
| Rank | Lane | Name | Nationality | Time | Notes |
|---|---|---|---|---|---|
| 1 | 4 | Emilie Beckmann | Denmark | 25.86 | Q |
| 2 | 5 | Ranomi Kromowidjojo | Netherlands | 25.95 | Q |
| 3 | 3 | Anna Dowgiert | Poland | 26.14 | Q |
| 4 | 6 | Kim Busch | Netherlands | 26.42 | |
| 5 | 2 | Ilaria Bianchi | Italy | 26.43 | |
| 6 | 7 | Louise Hansson | Sweden | 26.54 | |
| 7 | 1 | Julie Kepp Jensen | Denmark | 26.86 | |
| 8 | 8 | Lucie Svěcená | Czech Republic | 26.90 | |

==== Semifinal 2 ====
| Rank | Lane | Name | Nationality | Time | Notes |
|---|---|---|---|---|---|
| 1 | 4 | Sarah Sjöström | Sweden | 25.51 | Q |
| 2 | 3 | Melanie Henique | France | 25.68 | Q |
| 3 | 5 | Kimberly Buys | Belgium | 25.76 | Q |
| 4 | 2 | Aliena Schmidtke | Germany | 26.09 | Q |
| 5 | 1 | Anna Ntountounaki | Greece | 26.22 | Q NR |
| 6 | 7 | Mimosa Jallow | Finland | 26.24 | |
| 7 | 6 | Elena Di Liddo | Italy | 26.36 | |
| 8 | 8 | Alexandra Touretski | Switzerland | 26.66 | |

=== Final ===
The final was started on 9 August at 16:45.

| Rank | Lane | Name | Nationality | Time | Notes |
|---|---|---|---|---|---|
| 1st place, gold medalist(s) | 4 | Sarah Sjöström | Sweden | 25.16 | |
| 2nd place, silver medalist(s) | 6 | Emilie Beckmann | Denmark | 25.72 | |
| 3rd place, bronze medalist(s) | 3 | Kimberly Buys | Belgium | 25.74 | |
| 4 | 7 | Aliena Schmidtke | Germany | 25.77 | |
| 5 | 5 | Melanie Henique | France | 25.84 | |
| 6 | 2 | Ranomi Kromowidjojo | Netherlands | 25.88 | |
| 7 | 1 | Anna Dowgiert | Poland | 26.18 | |
| 8 | 8 | Anna Ntountounaki | Greece | 26.23 | |
