= Swimming at the 2014 European Aquatics Championships – Women's 100 metre butterfly =

Women's 100 metre butterfly at the Swimming at the 2014 European Aquatics Championships
- Dates: 21–22 August
- Competitors: 31 from 22 nations
- Winning time: 56.51

Medalists
| gold medal | Jeanette Ottesen | Denmark |
| silver medal | Sarah Sjöström | Sweden |
| bronze medal | Ilaria Bianchi | Italy |

The Women's 100 metre butterfly competition of the 2014 European Aquatics Championships was held on 21–22 August.

== Records ==
Prior to the competition, the existing world, European and championship records were as follows.

| | Name | Nation | Time | Location | Date |
|---|---|---|---|---|---|
| World record | Dana Vollmer | United States | 55.98 | London | 28 July 2012 |
| European record | Sarah Sjöström | Sweden | 56.06 | Rome | 27 July 2009 |
| Championship record | Martina Moravcová | Slovakia | 57.20 | Berlin | 2 August 2002 |

== Results ==
=== Heats ===
The heats were held at 10:05.

| Rank | Heat | Lane | Name | Nationality | Time | Notes |
|---|---|---|---|---|---|---|
| 1 | 3 | 4 | Jeanette Ottesen | Denmark | 57.42 | Q |
| 2 | 4 | 4 | Sarah Sjöström | Sweden | 57.80 | Q |
| 3 | 3 | 5 | Ilaria Bianchi | Italy | 57.84 | Q |
| 4 | 2 | 4 | Inge Dekker | Netherlands | 57.95 | Q |
| 5 | 4 | 5 | Elena di Liddo | Italy | 58.09 | Q |
| 6 | 4 | 7 | Kimberly Buys | Belgium | 58.41 | Q |
| 7 | 2 | 5 | Jemma Lowe | Great Britain | 58.43 | Q |
| 8 | 4 | 6 | Katarína Listopadová | Slovakia | 58.64 | Q |
| 9 | 3 | 2 | Katinka Hosszú | Hungary | 58.87 | |
| 10 | 4 | 1 | Danielle Villars | Switzerland | 58.91 | Q |
| 11 | 2 | 7 | Marie Wattel | France | 58.95 | Q |
| 12 | 2 | 3 | Alexandra Wenk | Germany | 59.11 | Q |
| 13 | 3 | 7 | Amit Ivry | Israel | 59.24 | Q |
| 14 | 3 | 6 | Silvia Di Pietro | Italy | 59.28 | |
| 15 | 4 | 2 | Judit Ignacio Sorribes | Spain | 59.36 | Q |
| 16 | 3 | 1 | Béryl Gastaldello | France | 59.69 | Q |
| 17 | 3 | 3 | Evelyn Verrasztó | Hungary | 59.76 | |
| 18 | 2 | 6 | Louise Hansson | Sweden | 59.79 | Q |
| 19 | 4 | 3 | Svetlana Chimrova | Russia | 59.89 | Q |
| 20 | 4 | 8 | Kristel Vourna | Greece | 1:00.06 | |
| 21 | 3 | 8 | Keren Siebner | Israel | 1:00.08 | |
| 22 | 2 | 2 | Aleksandra Gerasimenya | Belarus | 1:00.24 | |
| 23 | 2 | 8 | Lyubov Korol | Ukraine | 1:00.35 | |
| 24 | 1 | 3 | Noora Laukkanen | Finland | 1:01.03 | |
| 25 | 2 | 1 | Melanie Henique | France | 1:01.12 | |
| 26 | 3 | 0 | Martina van Berkel | Switzerland | 1:01.23 | |
| 27 | 2 | 0 | Anna Dowgiert | Poland | 1:02.95 | |
| 28 | 4 | 0 | Ezgi Yazıcı | Turkey | 1:03.00 | |
| 29 | 4 | 9 | Johanna Silventoinen | Finland | 1:03.19 | |
| 30 | 1 | 4 | Bianca Raduta | Romania | 1:04.60 | |
| 31 | 1 | 5 | Amina Kajtaz | Bosnia and Herzegovina | 1:05.17 | |

=== Semifinals ===
The semifinals were held at 18:31.

==== Semifinal 1 ====
| Rank | Lane | Name | Nationality | Time | Notes |
|---|---|---|---|---|---|
| 1 | 4 | Sarah Sjöström | Sweden | 57.39 | Q |
| 2 | 5 | Inge Dekker | Netherlands | 57.83 | Q |
| 3 | 6 | Katarína Listopadová | Slovakia | 58.53 | Q |
| 4 | 7 | Amit Ivry | Israel | 58.70 | |
| 5 | 8 | Svetlana Chimrova | Russia | 58.93 | |
| 6 | 3 | Kimberly Buys | Belgium | 59.07 | |
| 7 | 2 | Marie Wattel | France | 59.18 | |
| 8 | 1 | Béryl Gastaldello | France | 59.40 | |

==== Semifinal 2 ====
| Rank | Lane | Name | Nationality | Time | Notes |
|---|---|---|---|---|---|
| 1 | 4 | Jeanette Ottesen | Denmark | 57.45 | Q |
| 2 | 3 | Elena di Liddo | Italy | 58.04 | Q |
| 3 | 5 | Ilaria Bianchi | Italy | 58.28 | Q |
| 4 | 6 | Jemma Lowe | Great Britain | 58.34 | Q |
| 5 | 7 | Alexandra Wenk | Germany | 58.59 | Q |
| 6 | 8 | Louise Hansson | Sweden | 58.79 | |
| 7 | 1 | Judit Ignacio Sorribes | Spain | 59.08 | |
| 8 | 2 | Danielle Villars | Switzerland | 59.88 | |

=== Final ===
The final was held at 19:15.

| Rank | Lane | Name | Nationality | Time | Notes |
|---|---|---|---|---|---|
| 1st place, gold medalist(s) | 5 | Jeanette Ottesen | Denmark | 56.51 | CR |
| 2nd place, silver medalist(s) | 4 | Sarah Sjöström | Sweden | 56.52 | |
| 3rd place, bronze medalist(s) | 2 | Ilaria Bianchi | Italy | 57.71 | |
| 4 | 3 | Inge Dekker | Netherlands | 57.72 | |
| 5 | 6 | Elena di Liddo | Italy | 58.27 | |
| 6 | 7 | Jemma Lowe | Great Britain | 58.48 | |
| 7 | 8 | Alexandra Wenk | Germany | 58.59 | |
| 8 | 1 | Katarína Listopadová | Slovakia | 58.79 | |
