= Swimming at the 2014 European Aquatics Championships – Women's 50 metre freestyle =

Women's 50 metre freestyle at the Swimming at the 2014 European Aquatics Championships
- Dates: 23–24 August
- Competitors: 40 from 24 nations
- Winning time: 24.32

Medalists
gold medal	Francesca Halsall	Great Britain
silver medal	Sarah Sjöström	Sweden
bronze medal	Jeanette Ottesen	Denmark

The Women's 50 metre freestyle competition of the 2014 European Aquatics Championships was held on 23–24 August.

== Records ==
Prior to the competition, the existing world, European and championship records were as follows.

	Name	Nation	Time	Location	Date
World record	Britta Steffen	Germany	23.73	Rome	2 August 2009
European record	Britta Steffen	Germany	23.73	Rome	2 August 2009
Championship record	Marleen Veldhuis	Netherlands	24.09	Eindhoven	24 March 2008

== Results ==
=== Heats ===
The heats were held at 10:04.

Rank	Heat	Lane	Name	Nationality	Time	Notes
1	4	4	Sarah Sjöström	Sweden	24.38	Q
2	3	4	Jeanette Ottesen	Denmark	24.67	Q
3	5	3	Dorothea Brandt	Germany	24.77	Q
3	5	4	Francesca Halsall	Great Britain	24.77	Q
5	4	5	Pernille Blume	Denmark	25.03	Q
6	5	7	Therese Alshammar	Sweden	25.06	Q
7	3	3	Anna Santamans	France	25.15	Q
8	3	7	Maud van der Meer	Netherlands	25.18	Q
8	5	6	Elizaveta Bazarova	Russia	25.18	Q
10	5	5	Aleksandra Gerasimenya	Belarus	25.19	Q
11	4	7	Silvia di Pietro	Italy	25.22	Q
12	5	2	Erika Ferraioli	Italy	25.33	Q
13	4	6	Aleksandra Urbanczyk	Poland	25.36	Q
14	3	5	Inge Dekker	Netherlands	25.38	Q
15	3	1	Julie Levisen	Denmark	25.46	
15	4	2	Michelle Coleman	Sweden	25.46	
17	3	2	Rūta Meilutytė	Lithuania	25.54	
18	5	1	Darya Stepanyuk	Ukraine	25.55	Q
19	3	6	Hanna-Maria Seppälä	Finland	25.58	Q
20	4	1	Birgit Koschischek	Austria	25.59	
21	4	8	Yuliya Khitraya	Belarus	25.65	
22	3	8	Cecilie Johannessen	Norway	25.72	
23	2	3	Anna Kolárová	Czech Republic	25.87	
24	2	0	Nina Rangelova	Bulgaria	25.91	
25	5	9	Sviatlana Khakhlova	Belarus	25.97	
25	5	0	Jolien Sysmans	Belgium	25.97	
27	4	0	Fatima Gallardo	Spain	25.99	
28	2	5	Tess Grossmann	Estonia	26.02	
29	3	0	Maria Kameneva	Russia	26.08	
30	2	4	Magdalena Kuras	Sweden	26.12	
31	3	9	Ilse Kraaijeveld	Netherlands	26.15	
32	2	6	Anna Dowgiert	Poland	26.26	
32	4	9	Miroslava Najdanovski	Serbia	26.26	
34	2	7	Mimosa Jallow	Finland	26.36	
35	2	8	Eva Gliožerytė	Lithuania	26.55	
36	2	2	Ingibjörg Jónsdóttir	Iceland	26.92	
37	1	4	Julia Kukla	Austria	27.33	
38	1	5	Ivana Ninković	Bosnia and Herzegovina	27.35	
39	1	3	Katharina Egger	Austria	27.50	
40	1	6	Monika Vasilyan	Armenia	27.72	
—	2	1	Anna Mäkinen	Finland		DNS
—	2	9	Shauna Lee	Great Britain		DNS
—	4	3	Femke Heemskerk	Netherlands		DNS
—	5	8	Mie Nielsen	Denmark		DNS

=== Semifinals ===
The semifinals were held at 17.35.

==== Semifinal 1 ====
Rank	Lane	Name	Nationality	Time	Notes
1	5	Francesca Halsall	Great Britain	24.45	Q
2	4	Jeanette Ottesen	Denmark	24.55	Q
3	1	Inge Dekker	Netherlands	24.86	Q
4	3	Therese Alshammar	Sweden	24.99	Q
5	2	Aleksandra Gerasimenya	Belarus	25.20	
6	6	Maud van der Meer	Netherlands	25.26	
7	7	Erika Ferraioli	Italy	25.38	
8	8	Hanna-Maria Seppälä	Finland	25.55	

==== Semifinal 2 ====
Rank	Lane	Name	Nationality	Time	Notes
1	4	Sarah Sjöström	Sweden	24.39	Q
2	5	Dorothea Brandt	Germany	24.60	
3	2	Elizaveta Bazarova	Russia	24.94	Q
4	6	Anna Santamans	France	25.03	Q
5	7	Silvia di Pietro	Italy	25.04	Q
6	3	Pernille Blume	Denmark	25.12	
7	1	Aleksandra Urbanczyk	Poland	25.31	
8	8	Darya Stepanyuk	Ukraine	25.44	

=== Final ===
The final was held at 16:02.

Rank	Lane	Name	Nationality	Time	Notes
1st place, gold medalist(s)	5	Francesca Halsall	Great Britain	24.32	
2nd place, silver medalist(s)	4	Sarah Sjöström	Sweden	24.37	
3rd place, bronze medalist(s)	3	Jeanette Ottesen	Denmark	24.53	
4	1	Anna Santamans	France	24.81	
5	8	Silvia di Pietro	Italy	24.84	
6	2	Elizaveta Bazarova	Russia	24.91	
7	6	Inge Dekker	Netherlands	25.01	
8	7	Therese Alshammar	Sweden	25.20	
