= 2021 FINA World Swimming Championships (25 m) – Women's 50 metre butterfly =

Swimming competition

Women's 50 metre butterfly at the 2021 FINA World Swimming Championships (25 m)
- Venue: Etihad Arena
- Location: Abu Dhabi, United Arab Emirates
- Dates: 18 December (heats and semifinals); 19 December (final)
- Competitors: 60 from 54 nations
- Winning time: 24.44 CR

Medalists
gold medal	Ranomi Kromowidjojo	Netherlands
silver medal	Sarah Sjöström	Sweden
bronze medal	Claire Curzan	United States

The Women's 50 metre butterfly competition of the 2021 FINA World Swimming Championships (25 m) was held on 19 and 20 December 2021.

== Records ==
Prior to the competition, the existing world and championship records were as follows.

World record	Therese Alshammar (SWE)	24.38	Singapore	22 November 2009
Competition record	Ranomi Kromowidjojo (NED)	24.47	Hangzhou, China	14 December 2018

The following new records were set during this competition:

Date	Event	Name	Nation	Time	Record
19 December	Final	Ranomi Kromowidjojo	Netherlands	24.44	CR

== Results ==
=== Heats ===
The heats were started on 18 December at 09:43.

Rank	Heat	Lane	Name	Nationality	Time	Notes
1	7	4	Sarah Sjöström	Sweden	24.92	Q
2	6	4	Ranomi Kromowidjojo	Netherlands	24.97	Q
3	5	5	Maaike de Waard	Netherlands	25.12	Q
4	6	1	Claire Curzan	United States	25.17	Q
5	6	7	Zhang Yufei	China	25.20	Q
6	6	5	Arina Surkova	Russian Swimming Federation	25.33	Q
7	7	7	Torri Huske	United States	25.43	Q
8	7	2	Farida Osman	Egypt	25.60	Q
9	7	3	Silvia Di Pietro	Italy	25.64	Q
10	5	6	Elena Di Liddo	Italy	25.67	Q
10	7	5	Holly Barratt	Australia	25.67	Q
12	7	1	Sara Junevik	Sweden	25.69	Q
13	7	6	Emilie Beckmann	Denmark	25.75	Q
14	5	2	Julie Kepp Jensen	Denmark	25.76	Q
15	6	3	Anna Ntountounaki	Greece	25.81	Q
16	6	6	Marie Wattel	France	25.82	Q
17	5	9	Jenjira Srisaard	Thailand	26.19	
18	6	2	Jeong So-eun	South Korea	26.22	
18	7	9	Giovanna Diamante	Brazil	26.22	
20	5	1	Anastasiya Kuliashova	Belarus	26.26	
21	5	7	Rozaliya Nasretdinova	Russian Swimming Federation	26.28	
22	5	8	Ellen Walshe	Ireland	26.33	
23	6	8	Lana Pudar	Bosnia and Herzegovina	26.37	
24	5	0	Jana Pavalić	Croatia	26.47	
25	7	0	Tayla Lovemore	South Africa	26.78	
26	6	9	Alexandra Touretski	Switzerland	26.87	
27	4	5	Chan Kin Lok	Hong Kong	26.99	
28	4	1	Nikol Merizaj	Albania	27.03	NR
29	4	7	Mariam Sheikhalizadeh	Azerbaijan	27.32	NR
30	4	4	Gabriela Ņikitina	Latvia	27.45	
31	4	3	Lillian Slušná	Slovakia	27.49	
32	1	3	María José Ribera	Bolivia	27.55	
33	4	2	Jasmine Alkhaldi	Philippines	27.56	
34	3	4	Elisabeth Timmer	Aruba	27.58	NR
35	4	0	Oumy Diop	Senegal	27.66	NR
36	4	9	María Schutzmeier	Nicaragua	27.80	
37	4	8	Zaneta Alvaranga	Jamaica	27.93	
38	3	3	Samantha Roberts	Antigua and Barbuda	28.36	NR
39	3	2	Varsenik Manucharyan	Armenia	28.79	
40	3	5	Cherelle Thompson	Trinidad and Tobago	28.97	
41	3	7	Antsa Rabejaona	Madagascar	29.13	
42	3	6	Mikaili Charlemagne	Saint Lucia	29.16	
43	2	4	Khuyagbaataryn Enkhzul	Mongolia	29.34	
44	3	8	Nubia Adjei	Ghana	29.63	
45	2	5	Avice Meya	Uganda	29.90	
46	1	7	Mst Sonia Khatun	Bangladesh	30.13	
47	2	6	Khema Elizabeth	Seychelles	30.30	
48	2	3	Dirngulbai Misech	Palau	30.60	
49	3	0	Ayah Binrajab	Bahrain	30.65	
50	2	9	Muynin Kaing	Cambodia	30.77	NR
50	3	9	Denise Donelli	Mozambique	30.77	
52	2	1	Taffi Illis	Sint Maarten	31.99	
53	1	4	Daniella Nafal	Palestine	32.07	
54	1	5	Kayla Hepler	Marshall Islands	32.46	
55	1	6	Sophie Beth Taylor	Turks and Caicos Islands	32.78	
56	2	2	Jessica Makwenda	Malawi	34.07	
57	2	7	Tity Dumbuya	Sierra Leone	34.79	
58	2	8	Rahel Gebresilassie	Ethiopia	36.34	
59	2	0	Alia Ishimwe	Burundi	37.62	
60	1	2	Grace Nguelo'o	Cameroon	38.37	
	3	1	Timipame-ere Akiayefa	Nigeria	DNS	
	4	6	Marina Chan	Singapore	DNS	
	5	3	Maggie Mac Neil	Canada	DNS	
	5	4	Béryl Gastaldello	France	DNS	
	6	0	Barbora Seemanová	Czech Republic	DNS	
	7	8	Kylie Masse	Canada	DNS	

=== Semifinals ===
The semifinals were started on 18 December at 18:46.

Rank	Heat	Lane	Name	Nationality	Time	Notes
1	1	4	Ranomi Kromowidjojo	Netherlands	24.61	Q
2	2	4	Sarah Sjöström	Sweden	24.94	Q
3	2	3	Zhang Yufei	China	24.97	Q, NR
4	2	5	Maaike de Waard	Netherlands	25.19	Q
5	1	3	Arina Surkova	Russian Swimming Federation	25.20	Q
5	1	5	Claire Curzan	United States	25.20	Q
5	2	6	Torri Huske	United States	25.20	Q
8	2	2	Silvia Di Pietro	Italy	25.25	Q
9	1	1	Julie Kepp Jensen	Denmark	25.31	
10	2	8	Anna Ntountounaki	Greece	25.36	
11	1	6	Farida Osman	Egypt	25.49	
11	2	1	Emilie Beckmann	Denmark	25.49	
13	1	2	Elena Di Liddo	Italy	25.54	
14	2	7	Holly Barratt	Australia	25.63	
15	1	7	Sara Junevik	Sweden	25.68	
16	1	8	Marie Wattel	France	25.81	

=== Final ===
The final was held on 19 December at 18:06.

Rank	Lane	Name	Nationality	Time	Notes
1st place, gold medalist(s)	4	Ranomi Kromowidjojo	Netherlands	24.44	CR, NR
2nd place, silver medalist(s)	5	Sarah Sjöström	Sweden	24.51	
3rd place, bronze medalist(s)	7	Claire Curzan	United States	24.55	AM, WJ
4	1	Torri Huske	United States	24.88	
5	3	Zhang Yufei	China	24.91	NR
6	6	Maaike de Waard	Netherlands	25.12	
7	8	Silvia Di Pietro	Italy	25.26	
8	2	Arina Surkova	Russian Swimming Federation	25.29	
