= Swimming at the 2018 European Aquatics Championships – Women's 50 metre freestyle =

Women's Sports Competition

Women's 50 metre freestyle at the 2018 European Aquatics Championships
- Venue: Tollcross International Swimming Centre
- Dates: 3 August (heats and semifinals); 4 August (final)
- Competitors: 55 from 29 nations
- Winning time: 23.74

Medalists
gold medal	Sarah Sjöström	Sweden
silver medal	Pernille Blume	Denmark
bronze medal	Ranomi Kromowidjojo	Netherlands

The Women's 50 metre freestyle competition of the 2018 European Aquatics Championships was held on 3 and 4 August 2018.

== Records ==
Prior to the competition, the existing world and championship records were as follows.

	Name	Nation	Time	Location	Date
World record European record	Sarah Sjöström	Sweden	23.67	Budapest	29 July 2017
Championship record	Ranomi Kromowidjojo	Netherlands	24.07	London	22 May 2016

The following new records were set during this competition.

Date	Event	Name	Nationality	Time	Record
3 August	Semifinal 1	Pernille Blume	Denmark	23.85	CR
4 August	Final	Sarah Sjöström	Sweden	23.74	CR

== Results ==
=== Heats ===
The heats were held on 3 August at 10:13.

Rank	Heat	Lane	Name	Nationality	Time	Notes
1	6	4	Sarah Sjöström	Sweden	24.14	Q
2	4	4	Pernille Blume	Denmark	24.27	Q
3	6	5	Maria Kameneva	Russia	24.39	Q, NR
4	5	5	Tamara van Vliet	Netherlands	24.77	Q
5	5	4	Ranomi Kromowidjojo	Netherlands	24.82	Q
6	4	3	Kim Busch	Netherlands	24.93	
7	5	6	Theodora Drakou	Greece	24.98	Q
8	6	6	Julie Kepp Jensen	Denmark	25.00	Q
9	6	3	Rozaliya Nasretdinova	Russia	25.01	Q
10	3	8	Rūta Meilutytė	Lithuania	25.20	Q
11	4	7	Erika Ferraioli	Italy	25.28	Q
12	6	7	Nina Kost	Switzerland	25.29	Q
13	6	2	Lidón Muñoz	Spain	25.32	Q
14	5	7	Andrea Murez	Israel	25.36	Q
15	4	1	Anika Apostalon	Czech Republic	25.37	Q
16	5	9	Alexandra Touretski	Switzerland	25.47	Q
17	5	8	Anna Dowgiert	Poland	25.49	QSO
17	6	8	Lucrezia Raco	Italy	25.49	QSO
19	5	1	Anna Hopkin	Great Britain	25.53	
19	5	3	Mimosa Jallow	Finland	25.53	
21	3	5	Gabriela Ņikitina	Latvia	25.58	
22	6	1	Anouchka Martin	France	25.59	
23	4	8	Neža Klančar	Slovenia	25.62	
24	6	0	Freya Anderson	Great Britain	25.70	
25	5	2	Susann Bjørnsen	Norway	25.73	
26	6	9	Anna Kolářová	Czech Republic	25.77	
27	4	2	Mélanie Henique	France	25.81	
27	4	6	Yuliya Khitraya	Belarus	25.81	
29	2	5	Lena Kreundl	Austria	25.82	
30	5	0	Nastassia Karakouskaya	Belarus	25.84	
31	3	7	Ieva Maļuka	Latvia	25.88	
32	3	6	Selen Özbilen	Turkey	25.97	
33	4	0	Iryna Pikiner	Ukraine	26.00	
34	3	3	Kalia Antoniou	Cyprus	26.02	
35	2	6	Laura Jensen	Denmark	26.16	
36	3	2	Magdalena Kuras	Sweden	26.19	
36	3	9	Janja Šegel	Slovenia	26.19	
38	3	4	Lucy Hope	Great Britain	26.22	
39	2	4	Jenna Laukkanen	Finland	26.42	
40	2	3	Arina Baikova	Latvia	26.53	
41	3	1	Kertu Alnek	Estonia	26.54	
42	4	9	Juliette Dumont	Belgium	26.56	
43	2	9	Daniela Georges	Poland	26.74	
44	1	5	Ida Hulkko	Finland	26.76	
45	2	8	Cornelia Pammer	Austria	26.77	
46	3	0	Kertu Kaare	Estonia	26.80	
47	2	7	Laura Benková	Slovakia	26.81	
48	2	1	Sezin Eliguel	Turkey	26.93	
49	2	2	Veera Kivirinta	Finland	27.07	
50	1	4	Nikol Merizaj	Albania	27.21	
51	1	7	Aleyna Özkan	Turkey	27.79	
52	2	0	Beatrice Felici	San Marino	27.81	
53	1	2	Sara Lettoli	San Marino	27.86	
54	1	1	Elisa Bernardi	San Marino	28.01	
55	1	8	Fjorda Šabani	Kosovo	28.16	
—	1	0	Eda Zećiri	Kosovo	Did not start	
—	1	3	Fatima Alkaramova	Azerbaijan	Did not start	
—	1	6	Ani Poghosyan	Armenia	Did not start	
—	1	9	Ekaterina Avramova	Turkey	Did not start	

=== Swim-off ===
The swim-off was held on 3 August at 11:47.

Rank	Lane	Name	Nationality	Time	Notes
1	4	Anna Dowgiert	Poland	25.11	Q
2	5	Lucrezia Raco	Italy	25.25	

=== Semifinals ===
The semifinals were held on 3 August at 17:18.

==== Semifinal 1 ====
Rank	Lane	Name	Nationality	Time	Notes
1	4	Pernille Blume	Denmark	23.85	Q, CR, NR
2	5	Tamara van Vliet	Netherlands	24.70	Q
3	6	Rozaliya Nasretdinova	Russia	24.86	Q
4	3	Theodora Drakou	Greece	24.96	Q
5	7	Lidón Muñoz	Spain	25.15	
6	1	Anika Apostalon	Czech Republic	25.22	
7	8	Anna Dowgiert	Poland	25.34	
8	2	Erika Ferraioli	Italy	25.39	

==== Semifinal 2 ====
Rank	Lane	Name	Nationality	Time	Notes
1	4	Sarah Sjöström	Sweden	23.92	Q
2	5	Maria Kameneva	Russia	24.21	Q, NR
3	3	Ranomi Kromowidjojo	Netherlands	24.58	Q
4	2	Rūta Meilutytė	Lithuania	25.04	Q, NR
5	6	Julie Kepp Jensen	Denmark	25.07	
6	7	Nina Kost	Switzerland	25.21	
7	8	Alexandra Touretski	Switzerland	25.22	
8	1	Andrea Murez	Israel	25.39	

=== Final ===
The final was held on 4 August at 18:23.

Rank	Lane	Name	Nationality	Time	Notes
1st place, gold medalist(s)	5	Sarah Sjöström	Sweden	23.74	CR
2nd place, silver medalist(s)	4	Pernille Blume	Denmark	23.75	NR
3rd place, bronze medalist(s)	6	Ranomi Kromowidjojo	Netherlands	24.21	
4	3	Maria Kameneva	Russia	24.40	
5	7	Rozaliya Nasretdinova	Russia	25.04	
6	2	Tamara van Vliet	Netherlands	25.11	
7	1	Theodora Drakou	Greece	25.14	
8	8	Rūta Meilutytė	Lithuania	25.16	
