= Valerie van Roon =

Dutch swimmer (born 1998)

Personal information
- National team: Netherlands
- Born: 13 August 1998 (age 27) Delft, Netherlands

Sport
- Sport: Swimming
- Strokes: Breaststroke, freestyle
- Club: De Dolfijn Amsterdam
- Coach: Rob Schut
Medal record
Women's swimming
Representing the Netherlands
World Championships (SC)
Silver medal – second place	2018 Hangzhou	4×50 m freestyle
Silver medal – second place	2018 Hangzhou	4×100 m freestyle
Silver medal – second place	2018 Hangzhou	4×50 m mixed freestyle
Bronze medal – third place	2022 Melbourne	4×50 m freestyle
European Championships (LC)
Bronze medal – third place	2022 Rome	50 m freestyle
Bronze medal – third place	2022 Rome	4×100 m freestyle
Bronze medal – third place	2022 Rome	4×100 m medley
European Championships (SC)
Gold medal – first place	2017 Copenhagen	4×50 m freestyle
Gold medal – first place	2017 Copenhagen	4×50 m mixed freestyle
Gold medal – first place	2019 Glasgow	4×50 m freestyle
Gold medal – first place	2025 Lublin	4×50 m freestyle
Gold medal – first place	2025 Lublin	4×50 m medley
Silver medal – second place	2021 Kazan	4×50 m freestyle
Silver medal – second place	2025 Lublin	4×50 m mixed medley
Bronze medal – third place	2025 Lublin	4×50 m mixed freestyle

Valerie van Roon (born 13 August 1998) is a Dutch swimmer. She is a three-time European Champion and a three-time World silver medalist.

== Career ==
van Roon competed at the 2014 European Junior Championships where she won the bronze medal in the 50 m freestyle and in the mixed 4 × 100 m freestyle.

She competed at the 2017 European Short Course Championships in the 4×50 m freestyle relay along with Ranomi Kromowidjojo, Femke Heemskerk, and Tamara van Vliet, and they won the gold medal and set the world record with a time of 1:33.91. She also competed in the heats of the 4×50 m mixed freestyle, and the Dutch team won the gold medal.

At the 2018 FINA World Championships, she competed in the women's 4 × 50 m freestyle with Ranomi Kromowidjojo, Femke Heemskerk, and Kim Busch, and they won the silver medal behind the United States. She also competed in the heats of the women's 4 × 100 metre freestyle with Busch, Kromowidjojo, and Maaike de Waard, and they finished second, van Roon was switched out for Heemskerk in the finals, but van Roon still received a silver medal. Additionally, she competed in the heats of the mixed 4 × 50 metre freestyle relay with Jesse Puts, Stan Pijnenburg, and Busch, and they finished fifth. She did not compete in the final, but she still received the silver medal.

Van Roon competed at the 2019 European Short Course Championships in the 4×50 m freestyle relay along with Tamara van Vliet, Kira Toussaint, and Femke Heemskerk, and they tied for the gold medal with the French relay team.

She competed in the Paris Olympics 2024, reaching the semi-finals before eventually settling for a 12th place overall.
