= Sarah Sjöström =

Swedish swimmer (born 1993)

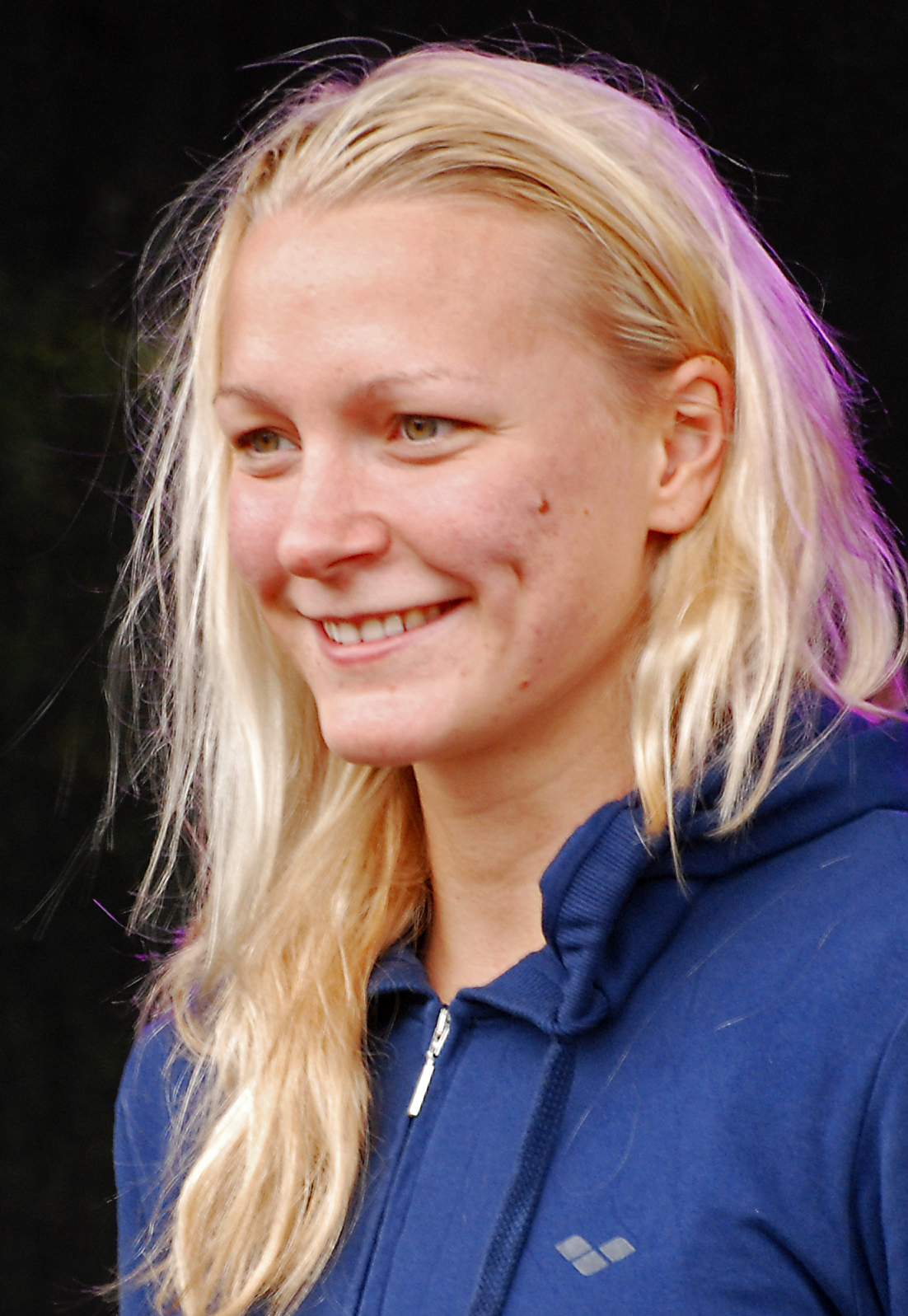
- Sjöström in Haninge, Sweden, in August 2013

Personal information
- Full name: Sarah Fredrika Sjöström
- National team: Sweden
- Born: 17 August 1993 (age 33) Salem, Sweden
- Height: 1.82 m (6 ft 0 in)
- Weight: 76 kg (168 lb)

Sport
- Sport: Swimming
- Strokes: Butterfly, freestyle, backstroke
- Club: Energy Standard, Södertörns SS
- Coach: Johan Wallberg
Medal record
Women's swimming
Representing Sweden
Event	1st	2nd	3rd
Olympic Games	3	2	1
World Championships (LC)	14	8	3
World Championships (SC)	6	4	1
European Championships (LC)	18	8	4
European Championships (SC)	12	13	1
Total	53	35	10
Olympic Games
Gold medal – first place	2016 Rio de Janeiro	100 m butterfly
Gold medal – first place	2024 Paris	50 m freestyle
Gold medal – first place	2024 Paris	100 m freestyle
Silver medal – second place	2016 Rio de Janeiro	200 m freestyle
Silver medal – second place	2020 Tokyo	50 m freestyle
Bronze medal – third place	2016 Rio de Janeiro	100 m freestyle
World Championships (LC)
Gold medal – first place	2009 Rome	100 m butterfly
Gold medal – first place	2013 Barcelona	100 m butterfly
Gold medal – first place	2015 Kazan	50 m butterfly
Gold medal – first place	2015 Kazan	100 m butterfly
Gold medal – first place	2017 Budapest	50 m freestyle
Gold medal – first place	2017 Budapest	50 m butterfly
Gold medal – first place	2017 Budapest	100 m butterfly
Gold medal – first place	2019 Gwangju	50 m butterfly
Gold medal – first place	2022 Budapest	50 m freestyle
Gold medal – first place	2022 Budapest	50 m butterfly
Gold medal – first place	2023 Fukuoka	50 m freestyle
Gold medal – first place	2023 Fukuoka	50 m butterfly
Gold medal – first place	2024 Doha	50 m freestyle
Gold medal – first place	2024 Doha	50 m butterfly
Silver medal – second place	2013 Barcelona	100 m freestyle
Silver medal – second place	2015 Kazan	100 m freestyle
Silver medal – second place	2015 Kazan	4×100 m medley
Silver medal – second place	2017 Budapest	100 m freestyle
Silver medal – second place	2019 Gwangju	50 m freestyle
Silver medal – second place	2019 Gwangju	100 m butterfly
Silver medal – second place	2022 Budapest	100 m freestyle
Silver medal – second place	2024 Doha	4×100 m medley
Bronze medal – third place	2015 Kazan	50 m freestyle
Bronze medal – third place	2019 Gwangju	100 m freestyle
Bronze medal – third place	2019 Gwangju	200 m freestyle
World Championships (SC)
Gold medal – first place	2014 Doha	200 m freestyle
Gold medal – first place	2014 Doha	50 m butterfly
Gold medal – first place	2014 Doha	100 m butterfly
Gold medal – first place	2021 Abu Dhabi	4×50 m medley
Gold medal – first place	2021 Abu Dhabi	4×100 m medley
Gold medal – first place	2021 Abu Dhabi	50 m freestyle
Silver medal – second place	2014 Doha	100 m freestyle
Silver medal – second place	2021 Abu Dhabi	100 m freestyle
Silver medal – second place	2021 Abu Dhabi	50 m butterfly
Silver medal – second place	2021 Abu Dhabi	4×50 m freestyle
Bronze medal – third place	2021 Abu Dhabi	4×100 m freestyle
European Championships (LC)
Gold medal – first place	2008 Eindhoven	100 m butterfly
Gold medal – first place	2010 Budapest	100 m butterfly
Gold medal – first place	2012 Debrecen	100 m freestyle
Gold medal – first place	2012 Debrecen	50 m butterfly
Gold medal – first place	2014 Berlin	100 m freestyle
Gold medal – first place	2014 Berlin	50 m butterfly
Gold medal – first place	2014 Berlin	4×100 m freestyle
Gold medal – first place	2016 London	100 m freestyle
Gold medal – first place	2016 London	50 m butterfly
Gold medal – first place	2016 London	100 m butterfly
Gold medal – first place	2018 Glasgow	50 m freestyle
Gold medal – first place	2018 Glasgow	100 m freestyle
Gold medal – first place	2018 Glasgow	50 m butterfly
Gold medal – first place	2018 Glasgow	100 m butterfly
Gold medal – first place	2022 Rome	50 m butterfly
Gold medal – first place	2022 Rome	50 m freestyle
Gold medal – first place	2022 Rome	4×100 m medley
Gold medal – first place	2026 Paris	50 m butterfly
Silver medal – second place	2010 Budapest	4×100 m medley
Silver medal – second place	2012 Debrecen	4×100 m freestyle
Silver medal – second place	2014 Berlin	50 m freestyle
Silver medal – second place	2014 Berlin	100 m butterfly
Silver medal – second place	2014 Berlin	4×200 m freestyle
Silver medal – second place	2014 Berlin	4×100 m medley
Silver medal – second place	2022 Rome	4×100 m freestyle
Silver medal – second place	2026 Paris	50 m freestyle
Bronze medal – third place	2008 Eindhoven	4×100 m freestyle
Bronze medal – third place	2010 Budapest	4×100 m freestyle
Bronze medal – third place	2016 London	4×100 m freestyle
Bronze medal – third place	2022 Rome	4×100 m mixed freestyle
European Championships (SC)
Gold medal – first place	2013 Herning	50 m butterfly
Gold medal – first place	2013 Herning	100 m butterfly
Gold medal – first place	2015 Netanya	100 m freestyle
Gold medal – first place	2015 Netanya	50 m butterfly
Gold medal – first place	2015 Netanya	100 m butterfly
Gold medal – first place	2017 Copenhagen	100 m butterfly
Gold medal – first place	2017 Copenhagen	50 m freestyle
Gold medal – first place	2017 Copenhagen	4×50 m medley
Gold medal – first place	2021 Kazan	50 m freestyle
Gold medal – first place	2021 Kazan	100 m freestyle
Gold medal – first place	2021 Kazan	100 m butterfly
Gold medal – first place	2021 Kazan	50 m butterfly
Silver medal – second place	2008 Rijeka	4×50 m freestyle
Silver medal – second place	2009 Istanbul	4×50 m freestyle
Silver medal – second place	2009 Istanbul	4×50 m medley
Silver medal – second place	2013 Herning	50 m freestyle
Silver medal – second place	2013 Herning	100 m freestyle
Silver medal – second place	2013 Herning	4×50 m freestyle
Silver medal – second place	2013 Herning	4×50 m medley
Silver medal – second place	2015 Netanya	50 m freestyle
Silver medal – second place	2015 Netanya	4×50 m medley
Silver medal – second place	2017 Copenhagen	100 m freestyle
Silver medal – second place	2017 Copenhagen	100 m medley
Silver medal – second place	2017 Copenhagen	4×50 m freestyle
Silver medal – second place	2021 Kazan	4×50 m medley
Bronze medal – third place	2021 Kazan	100 m medley

Sarah Fredrika Sjöström (Swedish: [ˈsɑ̂ːra ˈɧø̂ːstrœm]; born 17 August 1993) is a Swedish competitive swimmer specialising in the sprint freestyle and butterfly events. She is one of the most decorated swimmers of all time.

As of 2024, Sjöström has won a total of 23 individual medals at long course World Championships, more than any other swimmer in history. She was the first female swimmer to win five individual medals at a single FINA World Aquatics Championships, a feat she accomplished in 2019. In 2021, Sjöström achieved a career total of over 1000 most valuable player points in the International Swimming League, becoming the first swimmer in history to do so. In 2022, she became the first swimmer from any country to have won a total of 28 medals at LEN European Aquatics Championships. She has won a total of 112 medals at Swimming World Cups.

Sjöström is the current world record holder in the 50 metre butterfly (long course). She is a former world record holder in the 50 metre freestyle (long course and short course), 100 metre butterfly (long course and short course), 100 metre freestyle (long course and short course), 200 metre freestyle (short course), and the 4×50 metre medley relay (short course). She is the first Swedish woman to win an Olympic gold medal in swimming. She won the Overall Swimming World Cup in 2017 and 2018. In 2022, she became the first swimmer representing a country in Europe to win 10 individual World Championships gold medals.

Sjöström participated in five consecutive Olympic Games, from Beijing 2008 through Paris 2024. She has won six Olympic medals: three gold (100 metre butterfly, 100 metre freestyle and 50 metre freestyle), two silver (200 metre freestyle and 50 metre freestyle), and one bronze (100 metre freestyle).

== Career ==
=== 2008–2009 ===
==== 2008 European Championships ====
On 22 March 2008, at the age of 14, Sjöström won the gold medal in the 100 metre butterfly at the 2008 European Aquatics Championships in Eindhoven, Netherlands, with a time of 58.44 seconds. In the semi-finals the day before, she set a new Swedish record of 58.38 seconds, breaking the previous record of 58.71 seconds by Anna-Karin Kammerling. Three days earlier, she won her first medal of the Championships in the 4×100 metre freestyle relay, contributing a split time of 56.17 for the third leg of the relay in the preliminary heats before being substituted out for the finals relay and winning a bronze medal for her efforts when the finals relay placed third in 3:41.28. At the Swedish championships in 2008 in the same event, she finished in a time of 58.55 seconds.

==== 2008 Summer Olympics ====
Sjöström earned a spot on the Swedish Swim Team for the 2008 Summer Olympics in Beijing, China, where she finished 27th in the preliminary heats of the 100 metre butterfly with a time of 59.08 and 29th in the preliminary heats of the 100 metre backstroke with a time of 1:02.38, failing to advance to the semi-finals in both races. She also swam the backstroke leg of the 4×100 metre medley relay in the preliminaries, in which the Swedish team qualified in seventh place for the finals, though the team went on to be disqualified in the final for a false start. The day of the 4×100 metre medley relay final coincided with Sjöström's 15th birthday.

==== 2009 World Championships ====
2009 World Championships (LC)
Gold medal – first place	100 m butterfly	56.06 (WR)

On 26 July 2009, at the 2009 World Aquatics Championships, Sjöström set a world record in the semifinals of the 100 metre butterfly with a time of 56.44 seconds, surpassing Inge de Bruijn's nine-year-old record. The next day, in the final of the event, she won the gold medal and improved her world record time to 56.06 seconds at just 15 years, 344 days of age.

=== 2010–2012 ===
==== 2010 European Championships ====
At the 2010 European Aquatics Championships in Budapest, Hungary, Sjöström defended her European title in the 100 metre butterfly by winning the event. With a split time of 53.77 seconds for the third leg of the 4×100 metre freestyle relay in the final, she helped Sweden win the bronze medal in a time of 3:38.81. For the 4×100 metre medley relay, she anchored the relay in the final with a time of 53.73 seconds to help her country finish in 4:01.18 and win the silver medal. In December 2011, she broke the Swedish record when she won the 100 metre freestyle at the Open Dutch Championships in Eindhoven. However, she failed to win a medal at the 2011 World Aquatics Championships in Shanghai.

==== 2011 World Championships ====
At the 2011 World Aquatics Championships in Shanghai, China, Sjöström competed in five events, first placing fourth in the 100 metre butterfly with a time of 57.38 seconds, which was 0.32 seconds behind bronze medalist Lu Ying of China. In her next event, the 200 metre freestyle, she placed fourth, finishing less than nine-tenths of a second behind world record holder in the event and gold medalist Federica Pellegrini of Italy with a time of 1:56.41. The following day, she helped achieve a time of 8:02.30 and overall placing of twelfth in the 4×200 metre freestyle relay, splitting a 1:57.84 for the third leg of the relay in the preliminaries. Two days later, on the final day of competition, she contributed to an overall placing of tenth in the 4×100 metre medley relay, swimming the backstroke portion of the relay in 1:01.24 in the preliminaries to help achieve a time of 4:02.71 that did not qualify the relay for the evening final. Later in the day, she finished outside the podium in her third and final individual event, this time tying Lu Ying for fourth-place in the final of the 50 metre butterfly with a 25.87.

==== 2012 European Championships ====
For Sjöström, 2012 was a year of both successes and setbacks. At the 2012 European Aquatics Championships, held in early summer in Debrecen, Hungary, she achieved double gold medals in her individual events, with one in the 50 metre butterfly and one in the 100 metre freestyle. In her relay event, the 4×100 metre freestyle relay, she helped her team win the silver medal in a final time of 3:38.40, swimming the third leg of the relay in 54.04 seconds.

==== 2012 Summer Olympics ====
At the 2012 Summer Olympics in London, Sjöström competed in four individual events, reaching the semi-finals of the 50 metre freestyle, 100 metre freestyle and 200 metre freestyle, and placing fourth in the final of the 100 metre butterfly with a time of 57.17 seconds. Sjöström's world record was broken in this race by Dana Vollmer of the United States. In 2015, Sjöström regained the world record by improving it twice at the World Championships, held in Kazan, Russia.

=== 2013–2014 ===
==== 2013 World Championships ====
2013 World Championships (LC)
Gold medal – first place	100 m butterfly	56.53
Silver medal – second place	100 m freestyle	52.89

On 29 July 2013, Sjöström won the gold medal in the 100 metre butterfly at the 2013 World Aquatics Championships, in Barcelona, Spain, with a time of 56.53 seconds, which was 0.44 seconds faster than silver medalist Alicia Coutts of Australia and 0.71 seconds faster than bronze medalist Dana Vollmer. Four days later, she won a silver medal in the 100 metre freestyle, finishing 0.55 seconds behind a first-time world champion in the event, Cate Campbell of Australia, with a time of 52.89 seconds.

==== 2013 European Short Course Championships ====
At the 2013 European Short Course Swimming Championships in December in Herning, Denmark, Sjöström won four medals in individual events, a gold medal in the 50 metre butterfly with a Championships record of 24.90 seconds, a gold medal in the 100 metre butterfly, a silver medal in the 50 metre freestyle, and a silver medal in the 100 metre freestyle, and two medals in relay events, one silver medal each in the 4×50 metre freestyle relay and 4×50 metre medley relay.

==== 2014 European Championships ====
On 5 July 2014, Sjöström broke the world record in the long course 50 metre butterfly, set at 25.07 by fellow Swedish swimmer Therese Alshammar in 2009, with a time of 24.43 seconds. The margin of 0.64 seconds by which she lowered the world record compared to the prior record has been juxtaposed with Bob Beamon's 1968 long jump world record. At the 2014 European Aquatics Championships, held in Berlin, Germany later that summer, she won three gold medals and four silver medals. On 18 August, she and her Swedish relay teammates won the gold medal in the 4×100 metre freestyle relay. The next day she also won the final of the 50 metre butterfly. On 20 August, the she won her third gold medal, this time in the 100 metre freestyle. She also won silver medals in the 4×200 metre freestyle relay, 100 metre butterfly, 50 metre freestyle and 4×100 metre medley relay.

==== 2014 World Short Course Championships ====
2014 World Championships (SC)
Gold medal – first place	50 m butterfly	24.58 (CR)
Gold medal – first place	100 m butterfly	54.61 (WR)
Gold medal – first place	200 m freestyle	1:50.78 (WR)
Silver medal – second place	100 m freestyle	51.39

In December 2014, Sjöström competed in five individual events and two relay events at the 2014 World Short Course Swimming Championships, contested at Hamad Aquatic Centre in Doha, Qatar, medalling in four of seven of her events. She won her first medal of the Championships on day three in the 100 metre freestyle, finishing in a time of 51.39 seconds to win the silver medal just 0.02 seconds behind gold medalist Femke Heemskerk of the Netherlands. Approximately 30 minutes later, she won the gold medal in the 50 metre butterfly with a Championships record time of 24.58 seconds. Two days later, she won the gold medal in the 100 metre butterfly with a world record and Championships record time of 54.61 seconds, which was over four-tenths of a second faster than the former world record time. Approximately 70 minutes later, she won another gold medal with a world record and Championships record time, this time lowering the world record in the 200 metre freestyle by over three-tenths of a second with a final mark of 1:50.78. For her other three events during the five day competition, she placed fourth in the 4×100 metre medley relay with a 3:51.64, seventh in the 4×200 metre freestyle relay with a 4:43.44, and nineteenth in the 200 metre butterfly with a 2:09.51.

=== 2015–2016 ===
==== 2015 World Championships ====
2015 World Championships (LC)
Gold medal – first place	100 m butterfly	55.64 (WR)
Gold medal – first place	50 m butterfly	24.96 (CR)
Silver medal – second place	100 m freestyle	52.70
Silver medal – second place	4×100 m medley	3:55.24 (ER)
Bronze medal – third place	50 m freestyle	24.31

In 2015, and leading up to the World Championships, Sjöström received the Jerring Prize and a Victoria Scholarship. Approximately two months earlier, at the 2015 Eindhoven Swim Cup in April, she became the first female Swedish swimmer to achieve a time faster than 1:00.00 in the 100 metre backstroke, setting a new Swedish record with a personal best time of 59.98 seconds. At the 2015 World Aquatics Championships, held in July and August, she won a total of five medals, including gold medals in the 50 metre butterfly and 100 metre butterfly events, during the latter she broke the world record twice, first with a 55.74 in the semifinals then again with a 55.64 in the final. Her gold medal in the 50 metre butterfly was the first gold medal she won at a FINA World Aquatics Championships. With both of the gold medals, she also became the first Swedish swimmer to win two World Championships gold medals during a single World Aquatics Championships. In the 100 metre freestyle, she won the silver medal with a time of 52.70 seconds, sharing the podium with Australian sisters Bronte Campbell, gold medalist, and Cate Campbell, bronze medalist.

On the final day, Sjöström concluded competition with a bronze medal in the 50 metre freestyle and a silver medal in the 4×100 metre medley relay. Thus she won medals in all four individual events, and in the three relay events there was a silver medal and two fourth-place finishes. In all, she won two gold medals, two silver medals and a bronze medal during world championship week; more medals than any Swede had previously won at the same world championships.

==== 2015 European Short Course Championships ====
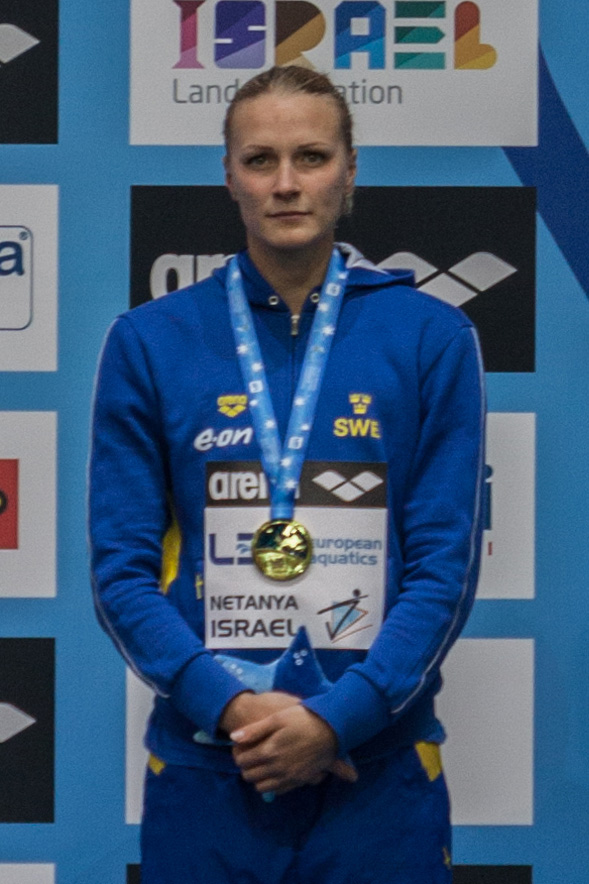
Sjöström at the 2015 European Short Pool Championships

At the 2015 European Short Course Swimming Championships, held in December in Netanya, Israel, Sjöström won the gold medal in the 50 metre butterfly with a Championships record time of 24.58 seconds on day two. The following day, she placed first in the final of the 100 metre freestyle with a time of 51.37 seconds to win the gold medal. In her first race of the fifth and final evening, the semifinals of the 50 metre freestyle, she finished in a time of 23.75 seconds to qualify for the final ranking second overall. Approximately, 28 minutes later, she won the gold medal in the 100 metre butterfly, achieving a Championships record time of 55.03 seconds in the final to finish 0.63 seconds ahead of silver medalist Jeanette Ottesen of Denmark. She won her second medal of the evening approximately 44 minutes later, swimming to a silver medal-finish in the final of the 50 metre freestyle with a time of 23.63 seconds, which was 0.07 seconds behind the first-place finisher and 0.41 seconds ahead of the third-place finisher. Concluding with the final of the 4×50 metre medley relay approximately 26 minutes later, she split a 24.33 for the butterfly leg of the relay to help finish in a time of 1:45.34 and win the silver medal.

Before the end of the year, Sjöström was named as the first Swedish swimmer by Swimming World to receive their accolade "Swimmer of the Year in Europe"; she was also awarded the Svenska Dagbladet Gold Medal, an annual award "for the most significant Swedish sports achievement of the year", with the words "For explosive willpower, double world records and a historic gold cavalcade".

==== 2016 European Championships ====
Ahead of her international competitions for the 2016 year, on 25 January 2016, Sjöström was awarded the Swedish public radio Jerring Award for the second year in a row. On the first day of swimming competition at the 2016 European Aquatics Championships, held in May in London, England, she won a bronze medal in the 4×100 metre freestyle relay, leading-off the relay with a 53.48 to contribute to the final mark of 3:37.84. She followed up with a gold medal-win the next day in the 50 metre butterfly, finishing first with a time of 24.99 seconds, which was 0.56 seconds slower than her world record time in the event. On the third day, she shared the podium with two Dutch swimmers in the 100 metre freestyle, winning the gold medal with a time of 52.82 seconds. The fourth day, she won her final medal of the competition, a gold medal in the 100 metre butterfly with a Championships record time of 55.89 seconds.

==== 2016 Summer Olympics ====
On 7 August 2016, Sjöström won the gold medal in the 100 metre butterfly at the 2016 Olympic Games in Rio de Janeiro, Brazil, setting a world record with a time of 55.48 seconds. With her win she became the first female Swedish swimmer to win a gold medal at an Olympic Games. She went on to win the silver medal in the 200 metre freestyle, where she finished 0.35 seconds behind gold medalist Katie Ledecky of the United States with a Swedish record time of 1:54.08, and the bronze medal in 100 metre freestyle, where she finished 0.29 seconds behind a two-way tie for the gold medal with a time of 52.99 seconds. With her medals, she became the second female swimmer in history and the fifth swimmer of any gender to win medals in the 100 metre freestyle, 200 metre freestyle, and the 100 metre butterfly at the same Olympic Games or long course World Championships, after Mark Spitz (1972), Kornelia Ender (1975, 1976), Matt Biondi (1986, 1988) and Michael Klim (1998).

=== 2017–2019 ===
In January 2017, Sjöström competed at the 19th Luxembourg Euro Meet and won the 50 metre freestyle with a time of 24.01 seconds, the 100 metre freestyle with a 53.21, the 50 metre butterfly with a time of 25.02 seconds, and the 100 metre butterfly with a 57.12. Three months later, she competed in the Stockholm Swim Open and won the 50 metre butterfly with a time of 25.63 seconds. She also won the 100 metre butterfly with a time of 56.26 seconds. She also won the 50 metre freestyle, setting a time of 23.83 seconds, the second fastest time ever. In the 100 metre freestyle she took first-place with the time of 52.54 seconds, a new personal best and Swedish record.

==== 2017 World Championships ====
2017 World Championships (LC)
Gold medal – first place	100 m butterfly	55.53 (CR)
Gold medal – first place	50 m butterfly	24.60 (CR)
Gold medal – first place	50 m freestyle	23.69
Silver medal – second place	100 m freestyle	52.31

At the 2017 World Aquatics Championships, with swimming contested at Danube Arena in July in Budapest, Hungary, Sjöström won her first medal of the Championships in the 100 metre butterfly, winning the gold medal with a Championships record time of 55.53 seconds, which was 0.65 seconds faster than silver medalist Emma McKeon of Australia and 0.84 seconds faster than bronze medalist Kelsi Dahlia of the United States. With her win, she became the first woman in history at FINA World Aquatics Championships to win four gold medals in the event and in any one individual event. One day earlier, in the final of the 4×100 metre freestyle relay on the first day of competition, she set a new world record in the 100 metre freestyle, swimming a time of 51.71 seconds for the lead-off leg of the relay, and helping place fifth in a time of 3:33.94. On the sixth day, she won a silver medal in the 100 metre freestyle with a time of 52.31 seconds, finishing just 0.04 seconds behind gold medalist and 2016 Olympic champion in the event Simone Manuel of the United States.

The seventh day, Sjöström started the evening session off winning the gold medal in the 50 metre butterfly with a Championships record time of 24.60 seconds, which was over seven-tenths of a second faster than the second-place finisher. Approximately an hour later, in the semifinals of the 50 metre freestyle, she broke the world record of 23.73 seconds set by Britta Steffen of Germany in 2009 with a new world record and Championships record time of 23.67 seconds. Day eight of eight, she won the gold medal in the 50 metre freestyle, finishing in a time of 23.69 seconds, just 0.02 seconds off her world record time from the day before. In her sixth and final event, the 4×100 metre medley relay, she split a 55.03 for the butterfly leg of the relay in the final, which was the fastest time by any of the finals relay butterfly swimmers by over one full second and contributed to a fifth-place finish in a time of 3:55.28.

==== 2017 Swimming World Cup ====
For the whole summer of 2017, Sjöström broke six world records in less than one month (the two at the aforementioned World Championships and later at 2017 Swimming World Cup short course competitions in Moscow, 50 metre freestyle at 23.10 seconds and 100 metre freestyle at 50.77 seconds, and Eindhoven, 100 metre freestyle at 50.58 seconds and 200 metre freestyle at 1:50.43). As a simultaneous holder of eight world records on the short and long course, she became the swimmer to hold the most current world records in international swimming. In early August, Sjöström improved her time in the short course 50 metre freestyle, at races in Berlin, from 23.10 to 23.00. In the race, however, she was second behind Ranomi Kromowidjojo, who with the time 22.93 took from Sjöström one of her eight records.

==== 2017 European Short Course Championships ====
For the third day of competition at the 2017 European Short Course Swimming Championships, in December in Copenhagen, Denmark, Sjöström won her first medal of the evening in the final of the 100 metre freestyle, placing second with a time of 51.03 seconds to secure the silver medal. Her second medal of the evening came in the 100 metre individual medley, finishing 0.95 seconds behind gold medalist Katinka Hosszú of Hungary in the final with a time of 57.92 seconds to win a second silver medal. Medal number three for the evening was a third silver medal, this time in the 4×50 metre freestyle relay, where she contributed to the final mark of 1:35.92 with a 22.94 for the second leg of the relay. Day five of five, she won her first gold medal of the Championships in the 100 metre butterfly with a Championships record time of 55.00 seconds, which was 0.97 seconds faster than silver medalist Marie Wattel of France. She won her second gold medal approximately 48 minutes later, finishing first in the final of the 50 metre freestyle with a Championships record of 23.30 seconds. Approximately 31 minutes later, she won her third and final gold medal of the night, splitting a 24.27 for the butterfly portion of the 4×50 metre medley relay to help place first in 1:44.43.

==== 2018 European Championships ====
In August, at the 2018 European Aquatics Championships in Glasgow, Scotland, Sjöström won the gold medal in the 100 metre butterfly on day two of competition with a time of 56.13 seconds. Approximately 65 minutes later, she swam a Championships record time of 23.74 seconds in the final of the 50 metre freestyle, finishing 0.01 seconds ahead of second-place finisher Pernille Blume of Denmark to win the gold medal. For the final of the 100 metre freestyle on day six, she won the gold medal with a time of 52.93 seconds after tying the Championships record time of 52.67 seconds in the semifinals the day before. In the final of the 50 metre butterfly on day seven, she won her fourth gold medal, this time finishing over half of one second ahead of silver medalist Emilie Beckmann of Denmark with a time of 25.16 seconds.

==== 2019 World Championships ====
2019 World Championships (LC)
Gold medal – first place	50 m butterfly	25.02
Silver medal – second place	100 m butterfly	56.22
Silver medal – second place	50 m freestyle	24.07
Bronze medal – third place	200 m freestyle	1:54.78
Bronze medal – third place	100 m freestyle	52.46

At the 2019 World Aquatics Championships held in Gwangju, South Korea, Sjöström won five medals, the most for a woman in individual events at the year's World Championships. She won a gold medal in the 50 metre butterfly with a time of 25.02 seconds, which marked the third consecutive gold medal she won in the event at the World Championships. In the 100 metre butterfly, she won the silver medal with a time of 56.22 seconds to finish less than four-tenths of a second behind gold medalist Maggie Mac Neil of Canada. She won her second silver medal of the Championships in the 50 metre freestyle, where she finished 0.02 seconds behind first-place finisher Simone Manuel with a time of 24.07 seconds. For her first bronze medal, she placed third in the 200 metre freestyle with a time of 1:54.78, finishing within six-tenths of a second of gold medalist Federica Pellegrini and within two-tenths of a second of silver medalist Ariarne Titmus of Australia. In the 100 metre freestyle she won her second of two bronze medals with a time of 52.46 seconds, sharing the podium with Simone Manuel, gold medalist, and Cate Campbell, silver medalist.

Based on her performances and result as the most decorated female competitor in individual events at the Championships, Sjöström was named FINA female swimmer of the meet, which she also won in 2017.

==== 2019 International Swimming League ====
In the fall of 2019, she was a member of the inaugural International Swimming League competing for the Energy Standard Swim Club of which she was co-captain with Chad le Clos. The team won the overall title in the season finale in Las Vegas, United States, in December. At the first stop of the regular season, in Indianapolis, United States, she won the Most Valuable Player title, amassing 55.5 points over the competition, and after the season finale in Las Vegas, she was named the overall Most Valuable Player for the entire season with 243.5 points. During the season, she won the 50 metre freestyle in three matches, the 100 metre freestyle in two matches, the 50 metre butterfly in three matches, and the 100 metre butterfly in one match. She also won the 50 metre freestyle skins event at three matches.

=== 2020–2021 ===
==== 2020 International Swimming League ====
In the 2020 International Swimming League season Sjöström placed 5th overall in points in 2020, due in part to a back injury that made her sit out of a full match. She ranked second to Caeleb Dressel in points-per-match with 59.4, noted 16 individual wins, including three in the skins. And while neither were official world records, Sjöström also featured on Energy Standard's women's and mixed 4×100 freestyle relays that were both the fastest of all time.

==== 2020 Summer Olympics ====
Due to a broken elbow Sjöström accidentally obtained by falling on ice in February 2020, she did not compete at the 2020 European Aquatics Championships. She returned to training in the pool in March and to competitive swimming in early June ahead of the 2020 Summer Olympics. In the 50 metre freestyle at the 2020 Olympic Games in Tokyo, Japan, and held in 2021 due to the COVID-19 pandemic, Sjöström won the silver medal. The persistence Sjöström demonstrated in working through her elbow injury and winning a medal at the Olympic Games earned her the "Olympic Resilience Award" for the 2020 Summer Olympics from Swimming World. In her other events, Sjöström placed fifth in the 100 metre freestyle, fifth in the 4×100 metre medley relay, sixth in the 4×100 metre freestyle relay, and seventh in the 100 metre butterfly.

==== 2021 European Short Course Championships ====
At the 2021 European Short Course Swimming Championships held at the Palace of Water Sports in Kazan, Russia in November, Sjöström competed in nine events, winning four gold medals, one each in the 50 metre freestyle, 100 metre freestyle, 50 metre butterfly, and 100 metre butterfly, a silver medal in the 4×50 metre medley relay, and a bronze medal in the 100 metre individual medley as well as placing fourth in the 4×50 metre mixed medley relay and the 4×50 metre mixed freestyle relay and fifth in the 4×50 metre freestyle relay.

==== 2021 International Swimming League ====
In the 2021 International Swimming League, Sjöström became the first swimmer in history, male or female, to achieve over 1000 most valuable player points as part of their time competing in the International Swimming League, out-ranking the second-ranked Caeleb Dressel by over 50 points. Sjöström won most valuable player honors both for the entire 2021 season and for the 2021 final match. For the whole 2021 season, Sjöström was the top-earning athlete, winning $269,125 in the form of prize money, which was over $70,000 more than the next-highest-earning athlete Siobhán Haughey.

==== 2021 World Short Course Championships ====
2021 World Championships (SC)
Gold medal – first place	4×50 m medley	1:42.38 (WR)
Gold medal – first place	50 m freestyle	23.08 (CR)
Gold medal – first place	4×100 m medley	3:46.20 (ER)
Silver medal – second place	100 m freestyle	51.31
Silver medal – second place	50 m butterfly	24.51
Silver medal – second place	4×50 m freestyle	1:34.54 (NR)
Bronze medal – third place	4×100 m freestyle	3:28.80

For the 2021 World Short Course Swimming Championships at Etihad Arena in Abu Dhabi, United Arab Emirates in December, Sjöström entered to compete in the 50 metre freestyle, 100 metre freestyle, and 50 metre butterfly individual events. In the 4×100 metre freestyle relay, Sjöström swam on both the prelims and the finals relay, helping to win the bronze medal in the event in a time of 3:28.80, which was the first time she won a medal in the event at a world or European short course championships. Sjöström won her heat in the prelims with a time of 52.21 seconds in the 100 metre freestyle on day two, finishing 0.17 seconds ahead of Kayla Sanchez of Canada and qualifying for the semifinals ranked second overall. Later in the day, in the final of the 4×50 metre medley relay, Sjöström split a 23.96 for the butterfly leg of the relay to help win the gold medal and tie the world record and championships record at 1:42.38. The same session, she ranked first in the semifinals of the 100 metre freestyle with a 51.53 and qualified for the final the following day.

In the morning of day three, Sjöström qualified for the semifinals of the 50 metre butterfly ranking first with a time of 24.92 seconds. Sjöström won the silver medal in the final of the 100 metre freestyle later in the day with a time of 51.31, finishing less than four-tenths of a second behind gold medalist Siobhán Haughey of Hong Kong. For the semifinals of the 50 metre butterfly, she qualified for the final ranking second with a 24.94. In the final the following day, Sjöström won the silver medal with a time of 24.51 seconds. The fifth morning, Sjöström advanced to the semifinals of the 50 metre freestyle ranking first by over three-tenths of a second with a 23.31 in the prelims heats. In the semifinals she swam one-hundredth of a second faster, qualifying for the final with a time of 23.30 seconds.

On the sixth and final day, Sjöström led-off the 4×50 metre freestyle relay with a 23.50 in the prelims, helping qualify the relay to the final ranking third. In her first final of the evening, Sjöström helped set a new Swedish record of 1:34.54 and win the silver medal in the 4×50 metre freestyle relay with a lead-off split of 23.33 seconds. For her next race, the 50 metre freestyle final, Sjöström won the gold medal and set a new Championships record of 23.08 seconds, breaking the former record of 23.19 set by Ranomi Kromowidjojo of the Netherlands in 2018 by over one-tenth of a second. In her final event of the championships, Sjöström split a 54.65 for the butterfly leg of the 4×100 metre medley relay, helping win the gold medal in a new European record time of 3:46.20.

At the end of 2021, Sjöström was the only swimmer to rank in the top ten internationally in two or more individual long course metre events for 11 or more consecutive years, 2021 inclusive, ranking in the top ten in the 100 metre freestyle for 12 years and the 50 metre butterfly and 100 metre butterfly for 13 years. Additionally, Sjöström was tied with Katie Ledecky for number two in terms of total number of individual world records set in the 21st century, each having achieved 14 individual world records, and was six world records behind number one ranked Katinka Hosszú.

=== 2022 ===
==== 2022 World Championships ====
2022 World Championships (LC)
Gold medal – first place	50 m butterfly	24.95
Gold medal – first place	50 m freestyle	23.98
Silver medal – second place	100 m freestyle	52.80

In January 2022, Sjöström was announced as one of the team Sweden members pre-nominated for the 2022 World Aquatics Championships in Budapest, Hungary. In the 100 metre freestyle at the World Championships in June, she won the silver medal with a time of 52.80 seconds, this marked her seventeenth individual medal (eighteenth total), and sixth individual silver medal (seventh total), at FINA World Aquatics Championships. The following day, she won a gold medal in the 50 metre butterfly with a time of 24.95 seconds. It was her fourth consecutive gold medal in the event at a World Aquatics Championships. On the final day of competition, she started off with a gold medal in the 50 metre freestyle with a time of 23.98 seconds. This marked her tenth gold medal won in individual events at FINA World Aquatics Championships, making her the fifth swimmer from any country to achieve the feat, after Michael Phelps of the United States, Katie Ledecky of the United States, Sun Yang of China, and Ryan Lochte of the United States, and the first swimmer representing Europe to achieve the feat. For her final event, she swam the freestyle leg in the 4×100 metre medley relay, helping team Sweden achieve a fourth-place finish in the event with a finals relay time of 3:55.96.

==== 2022 European Championships ====
Sjöström was one of twelve Swedish female swimmers named to the official roster for the 2022 European Aquatics Championships, held in August in Rome, Italy. On the second day of competition, she ranked first in the prelims heats of the 50 metre butterfly with a time of 25.30 seconds, qualifying for the semifinals later in the day. She lowered her time to a 25.10 in the semifinals and qualified for the final ranking first by over half a second. The following day, she won the gold medal with a time of 24.96 seconds. Her swim marked the fourteenth time she had swum the race faster than 25.00 seconds. Later in the session, she won a silver medal in the 4×100 metre freestyle relay, swimming a 53.12 for the lead-off leg of the relay in the final to help finish in 3:37.29.

In the morning session on day five, Sjöström started off ranking first in the prelims heats of the 50 metre freestyle with a 24.50, qualifying for the semifinals. For her second event of the session, she helped qualify the 4×100 metre mixed freestyle relay to the final ranking sixth, splitting a 54.28 for the fourth leg of the relay. With a 24.27 in the semifinals of the 50 metre freestyle, she qualified for the final ranking first, 0.09 seconds ahead of Katarzyna Wasick of Poland. Finishing off the day, she won bronze medal in the 4×100 metre mixed freestyle relay, splitting a 52.68 for the third leg of the relay to contribute to the final time, and Swedish record, of 3:23.40. The bronze medal marked her 26th medal at LEN European Aquatics Championships and set a new record for the most number of medals won at the Championships by a female swimmer from any country. She further increased the record to a total of 27 medals the following day when she won the gold medal in the 50 metre freestyle with a time of 23.91 seconds, this also marked a new overall record by a swimmer from any country, male or female. The previous record was set by male swimmer Alexander Popov of Russia at 26 medals.

The seventh and final morning, Sjöström split a 54.01 for the freestyle leg of the 4×100 metre medley relay, helping qualify for the final ranking first in 3:59.19. In the final, she lowered her split time to a 52.04, helping win the gold medal in a time of 3:55.25, which marked her 17th gold medal at LEN Aquatics Championships and extended the all-time total medal record to 28 medals.

=== 2023 ===
At the 2023 Stockholm Swim Open in April, Sjöström won the long course 50 metre freestyle with the fastest time in the world for the 2023 year by a female at that point in the time, a 2023 World Aquatics Championships qualifying time of 23.92 seconds.

At the 2023 World Aquatics Championships, Sjöström won the long course 50 metre freestyle, breaking her own world record in the semifinal. In doing so, she set the record for the longest period of time in between world-record setting performances by an individual swimmer, 14 years and 3 days after first breaking the 100 metre butterfly world record in 2009. She also won the 50 metre butterfly for the fifth time in a row at the World Aquatic Championships. These two medals led her to tie and then overtake Michael Phelps as the swimmer with the most individual World Aquatic Championship medals at 21 in her career. She additionally performed on Sweden's 400 metre freestyle and 400 metre medley relays; notably, her lead-off split of 52.24 in finals for the freestyle relay would have earned her a silver medal in the 100 metre freestyle.

=== 2024 ===
==== 2024 World Championships ====
At the 2024 World Aquatics Championships in Doha, Sjöström won the long course 50 metre freestyle as well as the 50 metre butterfly. The latter for a sixth time in a row at the World Aquatic Championships.

==== 2024 Olympic Games ====
Sjöström, now focusing on the shortest distances, had only planned to swim 50 metre freestyle at the Olympics. However, she decided to join 100 m freestyle as it suited her schedule between the 4×100m freestyle relay and the 50 metre freestyle. She first raced in the heats and the final of the 4x100m freestyle relay, where the Swedish team finished 5th in the final setting a new national record. She then went on to win the gold in 100 metre freestyle on 31 July with a time of 52.16 seconds. Despite being the World Record holder, Sjöström had never won a gold medal in this distance at the global level. On the last day of competition she won another gold medal in the 50 metre freestyle, with a time of 23.71 seconds. She closed her Olympic Games with a 7th place finish in the 4x100m medley relay alongside her Swedish teammates.

== Personal bests ==
=== Long course (50 m) ===
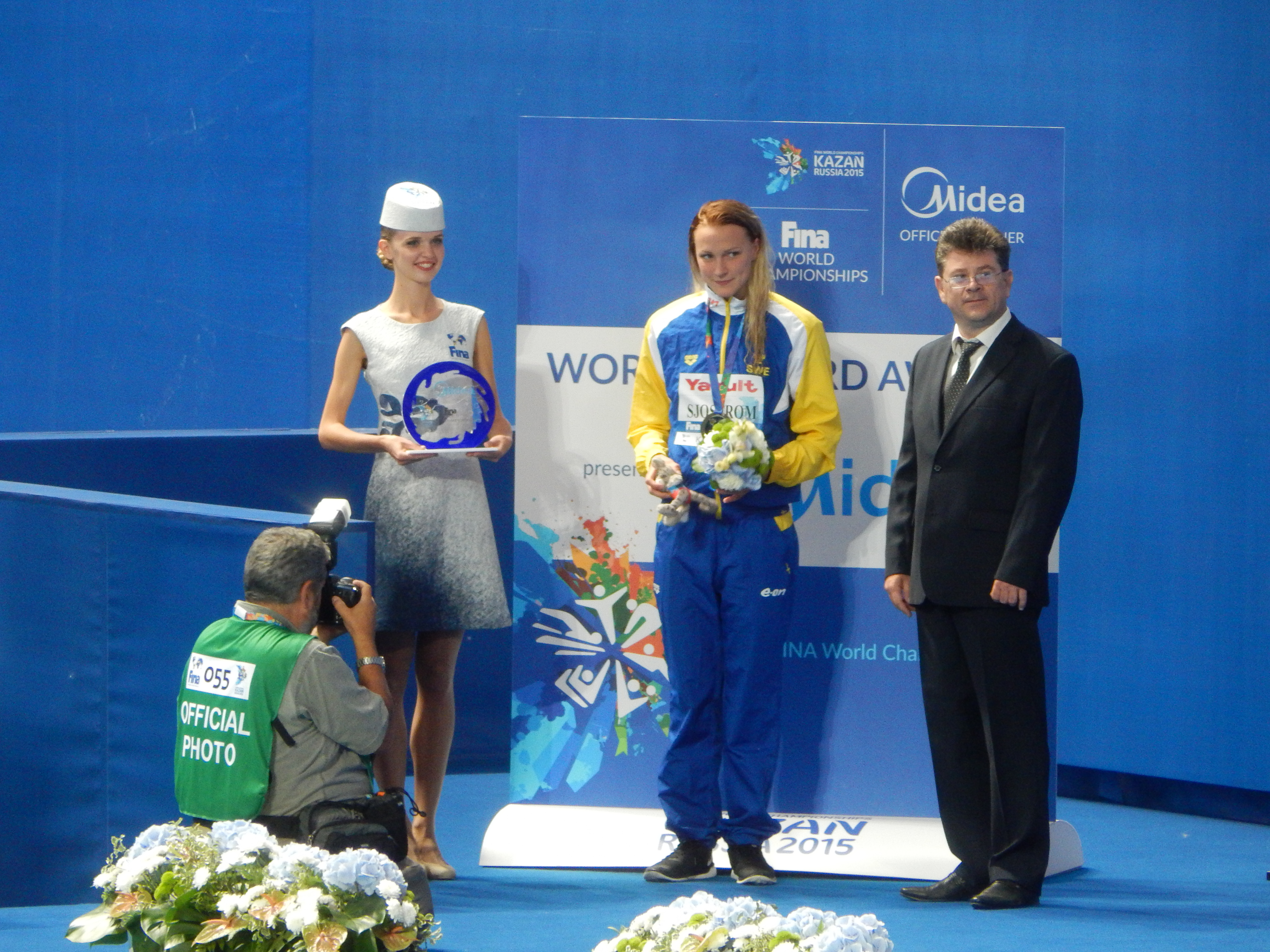
WR award in Kazan 2015

Event	Time		Date	Meet	Location	Ref
50 m freestyle	23.61	sf	30 Jul 2023	World Championships	Fukuoka, Japan	
100 m freestyle	51.71	r	23 Jul 2017	World Championships	Budapest, Hungary	
200 m freestyle	1:54.08		9 Aug 2016	2016 Summer Olympics	Rio de Janeiro, Brazil	
400 m freestyle	4:06.04		16 Mar 2014	Golden Lanes (in French)	Amiens, France	
50 m backstroke	27.80		30 Jun 2017	Swedish Championships	Borås, Sweden	
100 m backstroke	59.98		5 Apr 2015	Swim Cup (in Dutch)	Eindhoven, Netherlands	
50 m butterfly	24.43		5 July 2014	Swedish Championships	Borås, Sweden	
100 m butterfly	55.48		7 Aug 2016	Summer Olympic	Rio de Janeiro, Brazil	

Legend: WR – World record; ER – European record; NR – Swedish record; e – equalled existing record;
Records not set in finals: h – heat; sf – semifinal; r – relay 1st leg; rh – relay heat 1st leg; b – B final; † – en route to final mark; so – swim-off; tt – time trial

=== Short course (25 m) ===
Event	Time	Date	Meet	Location	Ref
50 m freestyle	23.00	7 Aug 2017	World Cup	Berlin, Germany	
100 m freestyle	50.58	11 Aug 2017	World Cup	Eindhoven, Netherlands	
200 m freestyle	1:50.43	12 Aug 2017	World Cup	Eindhoven, Netherlands	
400 m freestyle	4:02.33	20 Nov 2014	Swedish SC Championships	Stockholm, Sweden	
100 m backstroke	58.83	7 Nov 2010	World Cup	Stockholm, Sweden	
50 m butterfly	24.50	7 Nov 2021	European SC Championships	Kazan, Russia	
100 m butterfly	54.61	6 Dec 2014	World SC Championships	Doha, Qatar	
200 m butterfly	2:04.23	21 Nov 2014	Swedish SC Championships	Stockholm, Sweden	
100 m individual medley	57.10	2 Aug 2017	World Cup	Moscow, Russia	
200 m individual medley	2:08.17	27 Jan 2012	Swedish Jr SC Championships	Stockholm, Sweden	

Legend: WR – World record; ER – European record; NR – Swedish record; e – equalled existing record;
Records not set in finals: h – heat; sf – semifinal; r – relay 1st leg; rh – relay heat 1st leg; b – B final; † – en route to final mark; so – swim-off; tt – time trial

=== World records (50 m) ===
No.	Event	Time		Date	Meet	Location	Age	Status	Ref
1	100 m butterfly	56.44	sf	26 July 2009	World Championships	Rome, Italy	15 years, 343 days	Former	
2	100 m butterfly (2)	56.06		27 July 2009	World Championships	Rome, Italy	15 years, 344 days	Former	
3	50 m butterfly	24.43		5 July 2014	Swedish Championships	Borås, Sweden	20 years, 322 days	Current	
4	100 m butterfly (3)	55.74	sf	2 August 2015	World Championships	Kazan, Russia	21 years, 350 days	Former	
5	100 m butterfly (4)	55.64		3 August 2015	World Championships	Kazan, Russia	21 years, 351 days	Former	
6	100 m butterfly (5)	55.48		7 August 2016	Summer Olympics	Rio de Janeiro, Brazil	22 years, 356 days	Former	
7	100 m freestyle	51.71	r	23 July 2017	World Championships	Budapest, Hungary	23 years, 340 days	Former	
8	50 m freestyle	23.67	sf	29 July 2017	World Championships	Budapest, Hungary	23 years, 346 days	Former	
9	50 m freestyle (2)	23.61	sf	30 July 2023	World Championships	Fukuoka, Japan	29 years, 347 days	Former	

Legend: sf – semifinal; r – relay 1st leg

=== World records (25 m) ===
No.	Event	Time		Date	Meet	Location	Age	Status	Ref
1	100 m butterfly	54.61		6 December 2014	World SC Championships	Doha, Qatar	21 years, 111 days	Former	
2	200 m freestyle	1:50.78		7 December 2014	World SC Championships	Doha, Qatar	21 years, 112 days	Former	
3	50 m freestyle	23.10		2 August 2017	World Cup	Moscow, Russia	23 years, 350 days	Former	
4	100 m freestyle	50.77		3 August 2017	World Cup	Moscow, Russia	23 years, 351 days	Former	
5	100 m freestyle (2)	50.58		11 August 2017	World Cup	Eindhoven, Netherlands	23 years, 359 days	Former	
6	200 m freestyle (2)	1:50.43		12 August 2017	World Cup	Eindhoven, Netherlands	23 years, 360 days	Former	
7	4×50 m medley	1:42.38	=	17 December 2021	World SC Championships	Abu Dhabi, United Arab Emirates	28 years, 122 days	Former	

Legend: = – tied pre-existing world record

== International championships (50 m) ==
Meet	50 free	100 free	200 free	100 back	50 fly	100 fly	4×100 free	4×200 free	4×100 medley	4×100 mixed free
EC 2008				23rd		1st place, gold medalist(s)	(bronze) ^{[a]}		4th	—N/a
OG 2008				29th	—N/a	27th			8th^{[b]}	—N/a
WC 2009			19th		6th	1st place, gold medalist(s)	5th	13th	11th	—N/a
EC 2010		4th			4th	1st place, gold medalist(s)	3rd place, bronze medalist(s)	6th	2nd place, silver medalist(s)	—N/a
WC 2011			4th		4th	4th		12th	10th	—N/a
EC 2012		1st place, gold medalist(s)			1st place, gold medalist(s)		2nd place, silver medalist(s)			—N/a
OG 2012	14th	9th	12th		—N/a	4th	8th^{[b]}		10th	—N/a
WC 2013	4th	2nd place, silver medalist(s)	4th			1st place, gold medalist(s)	4th		9th	—N/a
EC 2014	2nd place, silver medalist(s)	1st place, gold medalist(s)			1st place, gold medalist(s)	2nd place, silver medalist(s)	1st place, gold medalist(s)	2nd place, silver medalist(s)	2nd place, silver medalist(s)	
WC 2015	3rd place, bronze medalist(s)	2nd place, silver medalist(s)			1st place, gold medalist(s)	1st place, gold medalist(s)	4th	4th	2nd place, silver medalist(s)	
EC 2016		1st place, gold medalist(s)			1st place, gold medalist(s)	1st place, gold medalist(s)	3rd place, bronze medalist(s)	6th		
OG 2016	13th	3rd place, bronze medalist(s)	2nd place, silver medalist(s)		—N/a	1st place, gold medalist(s)	5th	5th	9th	—N/a
WC 2017	1st place, gold medalist(s)	2nd place, silver medalist(s)			1st place, gold medalist(s)	1st place, gold medalist(s)	5th		5th	
EC 2018	1st place, gold medalist(s)	1st place, gold medalist(s)			1st place, gold medalist(s)	1st place, gold medalist(s)				
WC 2019	2nd place, silver medalist(s)	3rd place, bronze medalist(s)	3rd place, bronze medalist(s)		1st place, gold medalist(s)	2nd place, silver medalist(s)	6th		7th	
OG 2020	2nd place, silver medalist(s)	5th			—N/a	7th	6th		5th	—N/a
WC 2022	1st place, gold medalist(s)	2nd place, silver medalist(s)			1st place, gold medalist(s)				4th	
EC 2022	1st place, gold medalist(s)				1st place, gold medalist(s)		2nd place, silver medalist(s)		1st place, gold medalist(s)	3rd place, bronze medalist(s)
WC 2023	1st place, gold medalist(s)				1st place, gold medalist(s)		5th			
WC 2024	1st place, gold medalist(s)	DNS			1st place, gold medalist(s)				2nd place, silver medalist(s)	
OG 2024	1st place, gold medalist(s)	1st place, gold medalist(s)			—N/a		5th		7th	—N/a

^{a} Sjöström swam only in the heats.
^{b} Team Sweden was disqualified in the final.

=== International finals (50 m) ===
Only individual

Summer Olympic Games
Year	Date	Event	Time	Position
2012 London	29 July 2012	100 m butterfly	57.17	4th
2016 Rio de Janeiro	7 August 2016	100 m butterfly	55.48 WR	1st
2016 Rio de Janeiro	9 August 2016	200 m freestyle	1:54.08 NR	2nd
2016 Rio de Janeiro	11 August 2016	100 m freestyle	52.99	3rd
2020 Tokyo	26 July 2021	100 m butterfly	56.91	7th
2020 Tokyo	30 July 2021	100 m freestyle	52.68	5th
2020 Tokyo	1 August 2021	50 m freestyle	24.07	2nd
2024 Paris	31 July 2024	100 m freestyle	52.16	1st
2024 Paris	4 August 2024	50 m freestyle	23.71	1st

World Aquatics Championships
Year	Date	Event	Time	Position
2009 Rome	27 July 2009	100 m butterfly	56.06 WR	1st
2009 Rome	1 August 2009	50 m butterfly	26.66	6th
2011 Shanghai	25 July 2011	100 m butterfly	57.38	4th
2011 Shanghai	27 July 2011	200 m freestyle	1:56.41	4th
2011 Shanghai	30 July 2011	50 m butterfly	25.87	4th
2013 Barcelona	29 July 2013	100 m butterfly	56.53	1st
2013 Barcelona	31 July 2013	200 m freestyle	1:56.63	4th
2013 Barcelona	2 August 2013	100 m freestyle	52.89	2nd
2013 Barcelona	4 August 2013	50 m freestyle	24.45	4th
2015 Kazan	3 August 2015	100 m butterfly	55.64 WR	1st
2015 Kazan	7 August 2015	100 m freestyle	52.70	2nd
2015 Kazan	8 August 2015	50 m butterfly	24.96 CR	1st
2015 Kazan	9 August 2015	50 m freestyle	24.31	3rd
2017 Budapest	24 July 2017	100 m butterfly	55.53 CR	1st
2017 Budapest	28 July 2017	100 m freestyle	52.31	2nd
2017 Budapest	29 July 2017	50 m butterfly	24.60 CR	1st
2017 Budapest	30 July 2017	50 m freestyle	23.69	1st
2019 Gwangju	22 July 2019	100 m butterfly	56.22	2nd
2019 Gwangju	24 July 2019	200 m freestyle	1:54.78	3rd
2019 Gwangju	26 July 2019	100 m freestyle	52.46	3rd
2019 Gwangju	27 July 2019	50 m butterfly	25.02	1st
2019 Gwangju	28 July 2019	50 m freestyle	24.07	2nd
2022 Budapest	23 June 2022	100 m freestyle	52.80	2nd
2022 Budapest	24 June 2022	50 m butterfly	24.95	1st
2022 Budapest	25 June 2022	50 m freestyle	23.98	1st
2023 Fukuoka	29 July 2023	50 m butterfly	24.74	1st
2023 Fukuoka	30 July 2023	50 m freestyle	23.61 WR	1st
2024 Doha	17 February 2024	50 m butterfly	24.63	1st
2024 Doha	18 February 2024	50 m freestyle	23.69	1st

European Aquatics Championships
Year	Date	Event	Time	Position
2008 Eindhoven	22 March 2008	100 m butterfly	58.44	1st
2010 Budapest	10 August 2010	50 m butterfly	26.14	4th
2010 Budapest	11 August 2010	100 m freestyle	54.16	4th
2010 Budapest	13 August 2010	100 m butterfly	57.32	1st
2012 Debrecen	22 May 2012	50 m butterfly	25.64	1st
2012 Debrecen	23 May 2012	100 m freestyle	53.61	1st
2014 Berlin	19 August 2014	50 m butterfly	24.98	1st
2014 Berlin	20 August 2014	100 m freestyle	52.67 CR	1st
2014 Berlin	22 August 2014	100 m butterfly	56.52	2nd
2014 Berlin	24 August 2014	50 m freestyle	24.37	2nd
2016 London	17 May 2016	50 m butterfly	24.99	1st
2016 London	18 May 2016	100 m freestyle	52.82	1st
2016 London	19 May 2016	100 m butterfly	55.89 CR	1st
2018 Glasgow	4 August 2018	100 m butterfly	56.23	1st
2018 Glasgow	4 August 2018	50 m freestyle	23.74 CR	1st
2018 Glasgow	8 August 2018	100 m freestyle	52.93	1st
2018 Glasgow	9 August 2018	50 m butterfly	25.16	1st
2022 Rome	13 August 2022	50 m butterfly	24.96	1st
2022 Rome	16 August 2022	50 m freestyle	23.91	1st

== International championships (25 m) ==
Meet	50 free	100 free	200 free	50 fly	100 fly	200 fly	100 medley	4×50 free	4×100 free	4×200 free	4×50 medley	4×100 medley	4×50 mixed free	4×50 mixed medley
EC 2008		6th		7th	6th			2nd place, silver medalist(s)	—N/a	—N/a		—N/a	—N/a	—N/a
EC 2009		9th (h)	4th	7th	8th			2nd place, silver medalist(s)	—N/a	—N/a	2nd place, silver medalist(s)	—N/a	—N/a	—N/a
EC 2013	2nd place, silver medalist(s)	2nd place, silver medalist(s)		1st place, gold medalist(s)	1st place, gold medalist(s)			2nd place, silver medalist(s)	—N/a	—N/a	2nd place, silver medalist(s)	—N/a		
WC 2014		2nd place, silver medalist(s)	1st place, gold medalist(s)	1st place, gold medalist(s)	1st place, gold medalist(s)	19th				7th		4th		
EC 2015	2nd place, silver medalist(s)	1st place, gold medalist(s)		1st place, gold medalist(s)	1st place, gold medalist(s)				—N/a	—N/a	2nd place, silver medalist(s)	—N/a		
EC 2017	1st place, gold medalist(s)	2nd place, silver medalist(s)	DNS	9th	1st place, gold medalist(s)		2nd place, silver medalist(s)	2nd place, silver medalist(s)	—N/a	—N/a	1st place, gold medalist(s)	—N/a		
EC 2021	1st place, gold medalist(s)	1st place, gold medalist(s)		1st place, gold medalist(s)	1st place, gold medalist(s)		3rd place, bronze medalist(s)	5th	—N/a	—N/a	2nd place, silver medalist(s)	—N/a	4th	4th
WC 2021	1st place, gold medalist(s)	2nd place, silver medalist(s)		2nd place, silver medalist(s)				2nd place, silver medalist(s)	3rd place, bronze medalist(s)		1st place, gold medalist(s)	1st place, gold medalist(s)		

=== International finals (25 m) ===
Only individual

World Short Course Championships
Year	Date	Event	Time	Position
2014 Doha	5 December 2014	100 m freestyle	51.39	2nd
2014 Doha	5 December 2014	50 m butterfly	24.58 CR	1st
2014 Doha	7 December 2014	100 m butterfly	54.61 WR	1st
2014 Doha	7 December 2014	200 m freestyle	1:50.78 WR	1st
2021 Abu Dhabi	18 December 2021	100 m freestyle	51.31	2nd
2021 Abu Dhabi	19 December 2021	50 m butterfly	24.51	2nd
2021 Abu Dhabi	21 December 2021	50 m freestyle	23.08 CR	1st

European Short Course Championships
Year	Date	Event	Time	Position
2008 Rijeka	12 December 2008	100 m freestyle	53.45	6th
2008 Rijeka	12 December 2008	50 m butterfly	26.10	7th
2008 Rijeka	14 December 2008	100 m butterfly	57.40	6th
2009 Istanbul	11 December 2009	50 m butterfly	25.58	7th
2009 Istanbul	13 December 2009	200 m freestyle	1:54.32	4th
2009 Istanbul	13 December 2009	100 m butterfly	57.87	8th
2013 Herning	13 December 2013	100 m freestyle	51.99	2nd
2013 Herning	13 December 2013	50 m butterfly	24.90 CR	1st
2013 Herning	15 December 2013	100 m butterfly	55.78	1st
2013 Herning	15 December 2013	50 m freestyle	23.79	2nd
2015 Netanya	3 December 2015	50 m butterfly	24.58 CR	1st
2015 Netanya	4 December 2015	100 m freestyle	51.37	1st
2015 Netanya	6 December 2015	100 m butterfly	55.03 CR	1st
2015 Netanya	6 December 2015	50 m freestyle	23.63	2nd
2017 Copenhagen	15 December 2017	100 m freestyle	51.03	2nd
2017 Copenhagen	15 December 2017	100 m individual medley	57.92	2nd
2017 Copenhagen	17 December 2017	100 m butterfly	55.00 CR	1st
2017 Copenhagen	17 December 2017	50 m freestyle	23.30 CR	1st
2021 Kazan	3 November 2021	50 m freestyle	23.12 CR	1st
2021 Kazan	4 November 2021	100 m individual medley	58.05	3rd
2021 Kazan	5 November 2021	100 m freestyle	51.26	1st
2021 Kazan	6 November 2021	100 m butterfly	55.84	1st
2021 Kazan	7 November 2021	50 m butterfly	24.50 CR	1st

== Swimming World Cup circuits ==
The following medals Sjöström has won at Swimming World Cup circuits.

Edition	Gold medals	Silver medals	Bronze medals	Total
2007	0	0	1	1
2008	1	2	2	5
2009	2	1	2	5
2010	1	2	3	6
2011	2	1	1	4
2013	9	5	5	19
2017	25	9	0	34
2018	23	14	1	38
Total	63	34	15	112

== Accomplishments and awards ==
Sjöström won the gold in the 100 m freestyle at the 2024 Paris Olympics. She won the gold medal in the 100 m butterfly at the 2016 Rio Summer Olympics on 7 August 2016, setting an Olympic and World record with a time of 55.48. She also won a gold medal in 100 m butterfly in the World Championships in Rome 2009 and set the world record.

=== Awards ===
- Swedish Jerring Award: 2014 & 2015
- Victoria Award: 2015
- Female European Swimmer of the Year, announced by Swimming World Magazine: 2015, 2017, 2021 & 2022
- Swedish Svenska Dagbladet Gold Medal: 2015 & 2017
- Female World Swimmer of the Year, announced by Swimming World Magazine: 2017
- Best Female Athlete from Europe, announced by Association of National Olympic Committees (ANOC): 2017
- Female European Swimmer of the Year, Swammy Award announced by SwimSwam: 2017, 2018 & 2021
- MVP (season) in International Swimming League: 2019 & 2021
- Olympic Resilience Award, announced by Swimming World: 2021
- MVP in International Swimming League Final: 2021
- Female International Swimming League Swimmer of the Year, announced by Swimming World Magazine: 2021
- Best Female Swimmer, awarded by Ligue Européenne de Natation (LEN): 2021

== Personal life ==
In 2024, Sjöström married her boyfriend of twelve years, Swedish fencer Johan de Jong Skierus. In 2025, she gave birth to the couple's first child.

== See also ==
- World record progression 50 metres freestyle
- World record progression 100 metres freestyle
- World record progression 200 metres freestyle
- World record progression 50 metres butterfly
- World record progression 100 metres butterfly
- List of individual gold medalists in swimming at the Olympics and World Aquatics Championships (women)
- List of Olympic medalists in swimming (women)
- List of World Aquatics Championships medalists in swimming (women)
- List of World Swimming Championships (25 m) medalists (women)

Records
Preceded by (Germany) Britta Steffen	Women's 50 metre freestyle world record-holder (long course); 29 July 2017 – 19 June 2026	Succeeded by (United States) Kate Douglass
Preceded by (Australia) Cate Campbell	Women's 100 metre freestyle world record-holder (long course); 23 July 2017 – 27 June 2026	Succeeded by (Netherlands) Marrit Steenbergen
Preceded by (Sweden) Therese Alshammar	Women's 50 metre butterfly world record holder (long course); 5 July 2014 – present	Succeeded by Incumbent
Preceded by (Netherlands) Inge de Bruijn (United States) Dana Vollmer	Women's 100 metre butterfly world record holder (long course); 27 July 2009 – 29 July 2012; 2 August 2015 – 15 June 2024	Succeeded by (United States) Dana Vollmer (United States) Gretchen Walsh
Preceded by (Netherlands) Ranomi Kromowidjojo	Women's 50 metre freestyle world record holder (short course); 2 August 2017 – 7 August 2017	Succeeded by (Netherlands) Ranomi Kromowidjojo
Preceded by (Australia) Cate Campbell	Women's 100 metre freestyle world record holder (short course); 3 August 2017 – 26 October 2017	Succeeded by (Australia) Cate Campbell
Preceded by (Italy) Federica Pellegrini	Women's 200 metre freestyle world record holder (short course); 7 December 2014 – 12 December 2021	Succeeded by (Hong Kong) Siobhán Haughey
Preceded by (France) Diane Bui Duyet	Women's 100 metre butterfly world record holder (short course); 7 December 2014 – 3 December 2021	Succeeded by (United States) Kelsi Dahlia
Awards
Preceded by Ingemarsdotter, Wikén, Haag, Kalla; Henrik Stenson	Svenska Dagbladet Gold Medal; 2015; 2017	Succeeded by Henrik Stenson; Hanna Öberg
Preceded by Katinka Hosszú; Katinka Hosszú; Katinka Hosszú	European Swimmer of the Year; 2015; 2017, 2018; 2021 – 2024	Succeeded by Katinka Hosszú; Katinka Hosszú; Incumbent
Preceded by Katie Ledecky	Swimming World; World Swimmer of the Year; 2017	Succeeded by Katie Ledecky
Preceded by Katinka Hosszú; Katinka Hosszú	FINA Swimmer of the Year; 2017; 2019	Succeeded by Katinka Hosszú; Emma McKeon
