= Swimming at the 2022 European Aquatics Championships – Women's 50 metre freestyle =

Women's 50 metre freestyle at the 2022 European Aquatics Championships
- Venue: Foro Italico
- Dates: 15 August (heats and semifinals); 16 August (final)
- Competitors: 39 from 26 nations
- Winning time: 23.91

Medalists
gold medal	Sarah Sjöström	Sweden
silver medal	Katarzyna Wasick	Poland
bronze medal	Valerie van Roon	Netherlands

The Women's 50 metre freestyle competition of the 2022 European Aquatics Championships was held on 15 and 16 August 2022.

== Records ==
Prior to the competition, the existing world, European and championship records were as follows.

	Name	Nationality	Time	Location	Date
World record European record	Sarah Sjöström	Sweden	23.67	Budapest	29 July 2017
Championship record	Sarah Sjöström	Sweden	23.74	Glasgow	4 August 2018

== Results ==
=== Heats ===
The heats were started on 15 August at 09:00.

Rank	Heat	Lane	Name	Nationality	Time	Notes
1	5	4	Sarah Sjöström	Sweden	24.50	Q
2	4	4	Katarzyna Wasick	Poland	24.61	Q
3	3	5	Valerie van Roon	Netherlands	24.86	Q
4	5	2	Silvia Di Pietro	Italy	24.87	Q
5	3	4	Anna Hopkin	Great Britain	25.00	Q
6	3	6	Béryl Gastaldello	France	25.11	Q
6	4	5	Julie Kepp Jensen	Denmark	25.11	Q
8	5	3	Tessa Giele	Netherlands	25.14	Q
9	4	3	Kim Busch	Netherlands	25.22	
10	4	6	Petra Senánszky	Hungary	25.26	Q
11	4	8	Chiara Tarantino	Italy	25.28	Q
12	3	7	Theodora Drakou	Greece	25.29	Q
13	3	3	Lidón Muñoz	Spain	25.31	Q
14	5	6	Costanza Cocconcelli	Italy	25.37	
14	5	8	Sam van Nunen	Netherlands	25.37	
16	4	2	Alexandra Touretski	Switzerland	25.51	Q
17	4	9	Anna Hadjiloizou	Cyprus	25.55	Q
18	5	7	Elisabeth Sabro Ebbesen	Denmark	25.57	Q
19	3	9	Sara Junevik	Sweden	25.63	Q
20	5	0	Julie Meynen	Luxembourg	25.65	
21	3	8	Janja Šegel	Slovenia	25.67	
22	4	1	Danielle Hill	Ireland	25.77	
23	2	4	Julia Maik	Poland	25.83	
24	2	5	Maria Drasidou	Greece	25.97	
25	3	1	Nina Stanisavljević	Serbia	25.99	
26	4	0	Sofia Åstedt	Sweden	26.12	
26	2	6	Ieva Maļuka	Latvia	26.12	
28	2	3	Tjaša Pintar	Slovenia	26.17	
29	2	7	Marina Jehl	France	26.21	
30	2	2	Jóhanna Elín Guðmundsdóttir	Iceland	26.29	
31	3	2	Rūta Meilutytė	Lithuania	26.38	
32	3	0	Daria Golovati	Israel	26.41	
33	2	1	Nikol Merizaj	Albania	26.70	
34	2	8	Veera Kivirinta	Finland	26.79	
35	2	0	Varsenik Manucharyan	Armenia	27.18	
36	1	5	Ani Poghosyan	Armenia	27.66	
37	2	9	Alisa Vestergård	Faroe Islands	27.67	
38	1	3	Hana Beiqi	Kosovo	27.82	
39	1	4	Jovana Kuljača	Montenegro	28.01	
	4	7	Isabella Hindley	Great Britain	Did not start	
	5	9	Lucy Hope	Great Britain	Did not start	
	5	1	Nina Kost	Switzerland	Did not start	
	5	5	Marie Wattel	France	Did not start	

=== Semifinals ===
The semifinals were started at 18:50.

Rank	Heat	Lane	Name	Nationality	Time	Notes
1	2	4	Sarah Sjöström	Sweden	24.27	Q
2	1	4	Katarzyna Wasick	Poland	24.36	Q
3	1	5	Silvia Di Pietro	Italy	24.72	Q, NR
4	2	5	Valerie van Roon	Netherlands	24.75	Q
5	2	3	Anna Hopkin	Great Britain	24.80	q
6	1	3	Béryl Gastaldello	France	24.89	q
7	2	6	Julie Kepp Jensen	Denmark	24.98	q
8	1	6	Tessa Giele	Netherlands	24.99	q
9	2	2	Petra Senánszky	Hungary	25.10	
10	1	7	Lidón Muñoz	Spain	25.18	
11	2	7	Theodora Drakou	Greece	25.20	
12	1	1	Anna Hadjiloizou	Cyprus	25.48	
13	2	1	Alexandra Touretski	Switzerland	25.49	
14	1	2	Chiara Tarantino	Italy	25.53	
15	1	8	Sara Junevik	Sweden	25.55	
16	2	8	Elisabeth Sabro Ebbesen	Denmark	26.04	

=== Final ===
The final was held at 18:07.

Rank	Lane	Name	Nationality	Time	Notes
1st place, gold medalist(s)	4	Sarah Sjöström	Sweden	23.91	
2nd place, silver medalist(s)	5	Katarzyna Wasick	Poland	24.20	
3rd place, bronze medalist(s)	6	Valerie van Roon	Netherlands	24.64	
4	8	Tessa Giele	Netherlands	24.74	
5	3	Silvia Di Pietro	Italy	24.77	
6	7	Béryl Gastaldello	France	24.82	
7	2	Anna Hopkin	Great Britain	24.87	
8	1	Julie Kepp Jensen	Denmark	25.18	
