= Nida Eliz Üstündağ =

Turkish swimmer (born 1996)

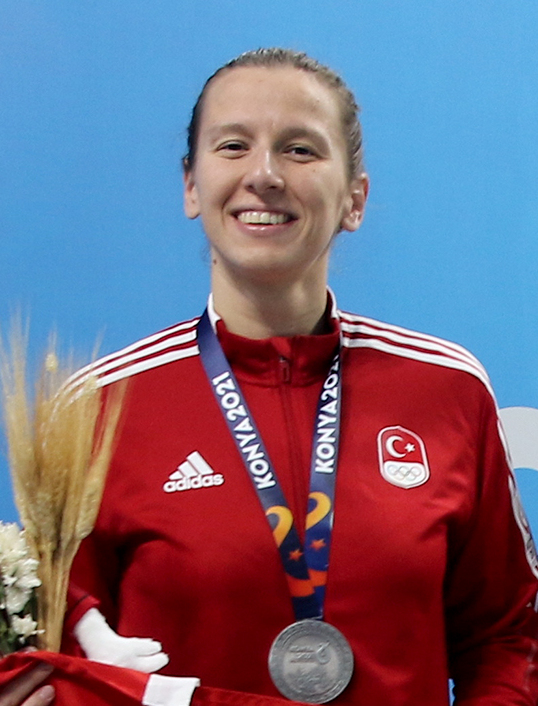

Personal information
- Nationality: Turkish
- Born: 21 October 1996 (age 29) Çanakkale, Turkey
- Height: 179 cm (5 ft 10 in)
- Weight: 66 kg (146 lb)

Sport
- Sport: Swimming
- Strokes: Butterfly stroke
- Club: Galatasaray Swimming
Medal record
Representing Turkey
Summer Universiade
Bronze medal – third place	2017 Taipei	200m butterfly
Islamic Solidarity Games
Gold medal – first place	2017 Baku	200m butterfly
Silver medal – second place	2021 Konya	100m butterfly
Silver medal – second place	2021 Konya	200m butterfly

Nida Eliz Üstündağ (born 21 October 1996) is a Turkish swimmer specialized in butterfly stroke. She is a member of Galatasaray Swimming.

She was born in Çanakkale on 21 October 1996. After graduation from Ankara Atatürk High School, she entered Başkent University to study Psychology.

Üstündağ competed for Ankara University before she transferred to Galatasaray Swimming.

In 2014, Üstündağ competed in the girls' 50 m butterfly, 100 m butterfly and 200 m butterfly events at the Summer Youth Olympics in Nanjing, China. She took part at the 2016 European Aquatics Championships in London, United Kingdom and placed 44th in the women's 50 m butterfly event.

She earned a quota spot to compete for Turkey in the women's 200 m butterfly event at the 2016 Summer Olympics.
