= Darya Stepanyuk =

Ukrainian swimmer (born 1990)

Personal information
- Full name: Stepanyuk Darya Viktorivna
- Nationality: Ukraine
- Born: 22 May 1990 (age 36) Kharkiv, Ukrainian SSR, Soviet Union
- Height: 5 ft 7 in (170 cm)

Sport
- Sport: Swimming
Medal record
Women's swimming
Representing Ukraine
Summer Universiade
Silver medal – second place	2011 Shenzhen	50 m freestyle
Silver medal – second place	2011 Shenzhen	100 m freestyle

Darya Stepanyuk (Ukrainian: Дар'я Степанюк, also Daria Stepaniuk, born 22 May 1990 in Kharkiv, Ukraine) is a Ukrainian swimmer.

After finishing college, Stepanyuk entered KNAPK as part of the cycle sport faculty.

Stepanyuk has broken several Ukrainian swimming records, and took part in the 2008 Olympic Games. Today she trains and works at Akvarena swimming pool in Kharkiv, and participates in various Ukrainian, European and world competitions.

During the 2009 Summer Universiade, Stepanyuk won gold medal in 100 m freestyle. The same year, she also participated at the Ukrainian Cup at which she won a gold medal in 100 m freestyle which was her second win at UC.

She competed in the 50 m freestyle and 4 × 200 m freestyle at the 2012 Summer Olympics.

As a representative of Dynamo Kharkiv, Darya Stepanyuk won silver medal in 50 m freestyle in 2015.

She again competed at the Olympics in 2016, competing in the 50 m freestyle and the 100 m butterfly events.

== See also ==
- Swimming at the 2008 Summer Olympics – Women's 100 metre freestyle
