= Lucie Svěcená =

Czech swimmer (born 1997)

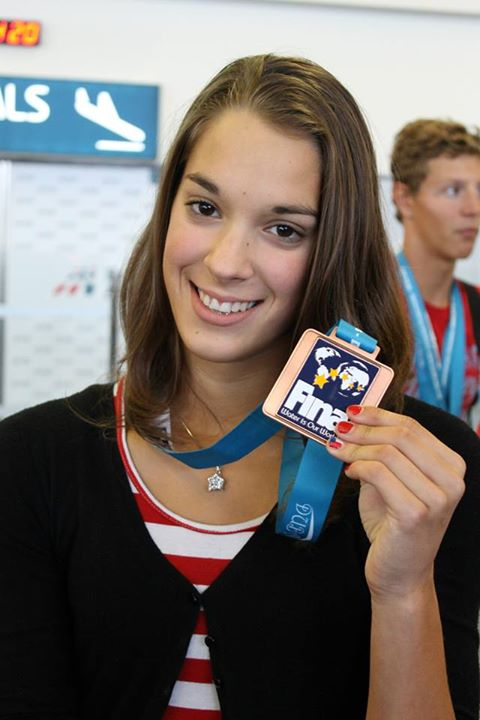
- Lucie Svecena – bronze medal Dubai 2013

Personal information
- Nationality: Czech Republic
- Born: 21 August 1997 (age 28) Most, Czech Republic

Sport
- Sport: Swimming
- Strokes: Butterfly
- Club: SK Jazzmani Žatec
- Coach: Karel Urban, Jiří Karas
Medal record
Women's swimming
European Championships (SC)
Silver medal – second place	2012 Chartres	4×50 m medley
Silver medal – second place	2013 Herning	4x50 m mixed medley
World Junior Championship
Bronze medal – third place	2013 Dubai	50 m butterfly
European Junior Championships
Silver medal – second place	2013 Poznan	100 m butterfly
Silver medal – second place	2013 Poznan	50 m butterfly

Lucie Svěcená (Czech pronunciation: [ˈlutsɪjɛ ˈsvjɛtsɛnaː]; born 21 August 1997) is a Czech swimmer. She is the first Czech female to swim 100 metre butterfly in long course swimming pool under one minute. She is a Czech record holder on 50m and 100m butterfly.

== Biography ==
In 2012, she won her first international medal when she swam in the medley relay with Simona Baumrtová, Petra Chocová and Anet Pechancová. This relay took silver medal on 2012 European Short Course Swimming Championships with time 1:47.67.

At 2013 European Junior Swimming Championships she swam 59.54 in the semifinals of 100m butterfly, which is the Czech record until now. In the finals she was a little slower and in a time of 59.69 she took silver medal, just 0.01s behind gold, despite it was her first bigger individual success. A few days later she added to silver from 100m butterfly another silver medal in 50m butterfly with a time of 26.88.

Later that year, she competed at 2013 FINA World Junior Swimming Championships. She improved her national record in the semifinals of 50m butterfly – 26.77. In the finals, where the world junior record was broken by Svetlana Chimrova, she won a bronze medal.

At 2013 European Short Course Swimming Championships she advanced to her first big final on 50m butterfly where she ranked the 8th place in time of 26.23. At this championship she swam also 4x50 mixed medley relay with Simona Baumrtová, Tomáš Plevko and Petr Bartůněk where they took silver medal after a disqualification of Russian relay, cause of Yuliya Yefimova failed a drug test.

She qualified at the 2014 Summer Youth Olympics, by eclipsing two FINA A-standards (50m, 100m butterfly). She reached final on 100m butterfly, where she ranked the 6th place in time of 1:00.18, as Czech republic's best swimmer's results at this Summer Olympics. In December that year she also compete at 2014 FINA World Swimming Championships (25 m) where she took the 24th respectively the 28th place on 50 and 100 metre butterfly.

In the year 2015 she started at her first World Aquatics Championship. She did not swim good times and she failed in reaching the semis. She took the 31st place on 50m butterfly and the 34th place on 100m butterfly. This year she was also competing 2015 European Short Course Swimming Championships in Israel. On the short course she reached the semis on 50m butterfly, where she took the 15th place with time 26.40. After that she improved Czech record on the national championship of the Czech republic with time 58.45 on 100m butterfly.

She qualified for the 2016 Summer Olympics, when she reached FINA A-standards (100m butterfly) with time 58.54 at Grand Prix of Pardubice, so she was the first Czech women to swim 100m butterfly in long course pool under 59 seconds.

== Personal bests ==
Long course
50m butterfly – 26.61 – NR (11 June 2015, Barcelona, Spain)
100m butterfly – 58.54 – NR (17 April 2014, Pardubice, Czech Republic)

Short course
50m butterfly – 26.15 – NR (13 December 2013, Herning, Denmark)
100m butterfly – 58.45 – NR (11 December 2015, Plzeň, Czech Republic)
