= Emilie Beckmann =

Danish swimmer (born 1997)

Personal information
- Nationality: Danish
- Born: 4 February 1997 (age 29)

Sport
- Sport: Swimming
- Strokes: Butterfly
Medal record
Representing Denmark
World Championships (SC)
Bronze medal – third place	2016 Windsor	4×50 m medley
European Championships (LC)
Silver medal – second place	2018 Glasgow	50 m butterfly
Silver medal – second place	2018 Glasgow	4×100 m medley
Bronze medal – third place	2020 Budapest	50 m butterfly
European Championships (SC)
Silver medal – second place	2017 Copenhagen	50 m butterfly
Silver medal – second place	2017 Copenhagen	4×50 m medley
Bronze medal – third place	2017 Copenhagen	100 m butterfly
Bronze medal – third place	2017 Copenhagen	4×50 m freestyle
Bronze medal – third place	2019 Glasgow	50 m butterfly
Bronze medal – third place	2019 Glasgow	4×50 m freestyle
Bronze medal – third place	2019 Glasgow	4×50 m mixed medley

Emilie Beckmann (born 4 February 1997) is a Danish swimmer. She competed in the women's 100 metre butterfly event at the 2017 World Aquatics Championships.
