= Anna Dowgiert =

Polish swimmer (born 1990)

Medal record

Women's swimming

Representing Poland

European Championships (SC)
Bronze medal – third place	2011 Szczecin	4x50 m medley

Anna Dowgiert (born 15 July 1990) is a Polish swimmer. She was born in Białystok. She competed at the 2012 Summer Olympics in London, in the 50 m freestyle, and at the 2016 Summer Olympics, in the 50 m freestyle and the 4 × 100 m freestyle relay.
