= Kimberly Buys =

Belgian swimmer (born 1989)

Personal information
- National team: Belgium
- Born: 23 April 1989 (age 37) Sint-Niklaas, Belgium
- Height: 1.87 m (6 ft 2 in)

Sport
- Sport: Swimming
- Strokes: Butterfly, freestyle, backstroke, medley
- Club: BRABO
Medal record
Women's swimming
Representing Belgium
European Championships (LC)
Bronze medal – third place	2018 Glasgow	50 m butterfly
European Championships (SC)
Silver medal – second place	2010 Eindhoven	200 m medley
Silver medal – second place	2012 Chartres	100 m butterfly

Kimberly Buys (born 23 April 1989) is a Belgian swimmer who competes in the Women's 100 metre butterfly. At the 2012 Summer Olympics she finished joint 19th overall in the heats in the women's 100 metre butterfly, and 29th in the women's 100 m backstroke. At the 2016 Olympics, she finished in 13th in the 100 m butterfly.
