= Swimming at the 2020 European Aquatics Championships – Women's 100 metre butterfly =

Women's 100 metre butterfly at the 2020 European Aquatics Championships
- Venue: Danube Arena
- Dates: 17 May 2021 (heats and semifinals); 18 May 2021 (final)
- Competitors: 54 from 28 nations
- Winning time: 57.37

Medalists
gold medal	Anna Ntountounaki	Greece
gold medal	Marie Wattel	France
bronze medal	Louise Hansson	Sweden

The Women's 100 metre butterfly competition of the 2020 European Aquatics Championships was held on 17 and 18 May 2021.

== Records ==
Before the competition, the existing world, European and championship records were as follows.

	Name	Nation	Time	Location	Date
World record European record	Sarah Sjöström	Sweden	55.48	Rio de Janeiro	7 August 2016
Championship record	Sarah Sjöström	Sweden	55.89	London	20 May 2016

== Results ==
=== Heats ===
The heats were started on 17 May at 11:03.

Rank	Heat	Lane	Name	Nationality	Time	Notes
1	6	4	Louise Hansson	Sweden	57.06	Q
2	4	4	Marie Wattel	France	57.69	Q
3	4	5	Arina Surkova	Russia	57.89	Q
4	5	3	Svetlana Chimrova	Russia	58.05	Q
5	5	4	Anastasiya Shkurdai	Belarus	58.26	Q
6	6	5	Elena Di Liddo	Italy	58.29	Q
7	5	6	Anna Ntountounaki	Greece	58.31	Q
8	5	5	Ilaria Bianchi	Italy	58.40	Q
9	4	6	Laura Stephens	Great Britain	58.71	Q
10	4	7	Paulina Peda	Poland	58.90	Q
11	5	7	Kimberly Buys	Belgium	59.10	Q
11	5	0	Dalma Sebestyén	Hungary	59.10	Q
13	6	6	Angelina Köhler	Germany	59.12	Q
14	6	3	Emilie Beckmann	Denmark	59.34	Q
15	4	3	Harriet Jones	Great Britain	59.36	Q
16	5	8	Maria Ugolkova	Switzerland	59.39	Q
17	5	2	Alys Thomas	Great Britain	59.46	
18	4	1	Anastasiya Kuliashova	Belarus	59.59	
19	3	2	Sara Junevik	Sweden	59.62	
20	6	7	Keanna MacInnes	Great Britain	59.64	
21	6	9	Panna Ugrai	Hungary	59.77	
22	4	8	Antonella Crispino	Italy	59.79	
23	6	1	Amina Kajtaz	Bosnia and Herzegovina	59.87	
24	6	2	Maaike de Waard	Netherlands	1:00.09	
25	3	7	Barbora Janíčková	Czech Republic	1:00.11	
26	2	4	Tamara Potocká	Slovakia	1:00.28	
27	5	1	Klaudia Naziębło	Poland	1:00.33	
28	3	4	Aina Hierro	Spain	1:00.52	
29	4	0	Dóra Hatházi	Hungary	1:00.54	
30	1	6	Hanna Rosvall	Sweden	1:00.60	
31	2	5	Alba Guillamón	Spain	1:00.77	
31	2	8	Nida Eliz Üstündağ	Turkey	1:00.77	
33	3	5	Ana Monteiro	Portugal	1:00.83	
34	4	9	Laura Lahtinen	Finland	1:00.85	
35	5	9	Tessa Giele	Netherlands	1:00.96	
36	2	6	Zora Ripková	Slovakia	1:01.24	
37	6	0	Paulina Nogaj	Poland	1:01.25	
38	3	1	Claudia Hufnagl	Austria	1:01.42	
38	6	8	Alexandra Touretski	Switzerland	1:01.42	
40	3	3	Jenna Laukkanen	Finland	1:01.51	
41	2	2	Maryam Sheikhalizadehkhanghah	Azerbaijan	1:01.63	
42	3	0	Ida Liljeqvist	Sweden	1:01.70	
43	2	3	Nina Stanisavljević	Serbia	1:01.78	
44	3	8	Ieva Maļuka	Latvia	1:01.90	
44	2	1	Réka Nyirádi	Hungary	1:01.90	
44	3	9	Julia Ullmann	Switzerland	1:01.90	
47	3	6	Viktoriya Kostromina	Ukraine	1:02.43	
48	2	9	Tanja Popović	Serbia	1:02.56	
49	4	2	Roos Vanotterdijk	Belgium	1:02.70	
50	2	7	Alina Vedehhova	Estonia	1:02.76	
51	1	4	Emma Marušáková	Slovakia	1:02.92	
52	2	0	Tamara Schaad	Switzerland	1:03.03	
53	1	5	Katie Rock	Albania	1:07.27	
54	1	3	Martta Ruuska	Finland	1:08.56	

=== Semifinals ===
The semifinals were held on 17 May at 18:32.

==== Semifinal 1 ====
Rank	Lane	Name	Nationality	Time	Notes
1	4	Marie Wattel	France	57.48	Q
2	5	Svetlana Chimrova	Russia	57.62	Q
3	3	Elena Di Liddo	Italy	57.88	q
4	6	Ilaria Bianchi	Italy	58.06	q
5	1	Emilie Beckmann	Denmark	58.24	
6	8	Maria Ugolkova	Switzerland	58.56	
7	2	Paulina Peda	Poland	59.27	
8	7	Kimberly Buys	Belgium	1:00.18	

==== Semifinal 2 ====
Rank	Lane	Name	Nationality	Time	Notes
1	4	Louise Hansson	Sweden	56.73	Q
2	6	Anna Ntountounaki	Greece	57.77	Q, =NR
2	5	Arina Surkova	Russia	57.77	Q
4	3	Anastasiya Shkurdai	Belarus	57.92	q
5	2	Laura Stephens	Great Britain	58.45	
6	1	Angelina Köhler	Germany	58.64	
7	7	Dalma Sebestyén	Hungary	58.85	
8	8	Harriet Jones	Great Britain	59.05	

=== Final ===
The final was held on 18 May at 18:18.

Rank	Lane	Name	Nationality	Time	Notes
1st place, gold medalist(s)	6	Anna Ntountounaki	Greece	57.37	NR
1st place, gold medalist(s)	5	Marie Wattel	France	57.37	
3rd place, bronze medalist(s)	4	Louise Hansson	Sweden	57.56	
4	3	Svetlana Chimrova	Russia	57.65	
5	7	Elena Di Liddo	Italy	58.05	
6	1	Anastasiya Shkurdai	Belarus	58.10	
7	2	Arina Surkova	Russia	58.21	
8	8	Ilaria Bianchi	Italy	58.41	
