= Swimming at the 2022 European Aquatics Championships – Women's 50 metre butterfly =

Women's 50 metre butterfly at the 2022 European Aquatics Championships
- Venue: Foro Italico
- Dates: 12 August (heats and semifinals); 13 August (final)
- Competitors: 37 from 25 nations
- Winning time: 24.96

Medalists
gold medal	Sarah Sjöström	Sweden
silver medal	Marie Wattel	France
bronze medal	Maaike de Waard	Netherlands

The Women's 50 metre butterfly competition of the 2022 European Aquatics Championships was held on 12 and 13 August 2022.

== Records ==
Prior to the competition, the existing world, European and championship records were as follows.

	Name	Nationality	Time	Location	Date
World record European record	Sarah Sjöström	Sweden	24.43	Borås	5 July 2014
Championship record	Sarah Sjöström	Sweden	24.87	Berlin	18 August 2014

== Results ==
=== Heats ===
The heats were started on 12 August at 09:00.

Rank	Heat	Lane	Name	Nationality	Time	Notes
1	4	4	Sarah Sjöström	Sweden	25.30	Q
2	3	4	Marie Wattel	France	25.72	Q
3	3	3	Louise Hansson	Sweden	25.88	Q
4	3	5	Sara Junevik	Sweden	25.96	
5	4	5	Maaike de Waard	Netherlands	26.01	Q
6	4	3	Silvia Di Pietro	Italy	26.06	Q
7	2	6	Kim Busch	Netherlands	26.22	Q
8	3	6	Paulina Peda	Poland	26.26	Q
9	2	4	Anna Ntountounaki	Greece	26.35	Q
10	3	2	Anna Dowgiert	Poland	26.40	Q
11	2	5	Tessa Giele	Netherlands	26.44	
12	4	6	Julie Kepp Jensen	Denmark	26.47	Q
13	2	3	Béryl Gastaldello	France	26.52	Q
14	4	7	Costanza Cocconcelli	Italy	26.74	Q
15	2	7	Maria Ugolkova	Switzerland	26.75	Q
16	3	7	Roos Vanotterdijk	Belgium	26.76	Q
17	4	2	Elena Di Liddo	Italy	26.91	
18	2	2	Lana Pudar	Bosnia and Herzegovina	26.96	Q
19	4	1	Elisabeth Ebbesen	Denmark	26.99	Q
20	4	8	Danielle Hill	Ireland	27.10	
21	3	1	Julia Maik	Poland	27.15	
22	2	1	Tamara Potocká	Slovakia	27.16	
23	3	8	Julia Ullmann	Switzerland	27.24	
24	1	6	Tjaša Pintar	Slovenia	27.39	
25	1	4	Anna Hadjiloizou	Cyprus	27.51	
26	2	0	Amina Kajtaz	Croatia	27.56	
27	3	9	Ieva Maļuka	Latvia	27.57	
28	4	0	Jenna Laukkanen	Finland	27.61	
29	4	9	Laura Lahtinen	Finland	27.63	
30	1	5	Jóhanna Elín Guðmundsdóttir	Iceland	27.71	
31	3	0	Nina Stanisavljević	Serbia	27.72	
32	1	3	Victorita Bogdaneci	Romania	28.01	
33	2	9	Nikol Merizaj	Albania	28.06	
34	1	2	Anastasia Tichy	Austria	28.36	
35	1	7	Varsenik Manucharyan	Armenia	28.80	
36	1	8	Hana Beiqi	Kosovo	29.72	
37	1	1	Alisa Vestergård	Faroe Islands	30.38	
	2	8	Laura Stephens	Great Britain	Did not start	

=== Semifinals ===
The semifinals were started at 18:42.

Rank	Heat	Lane	Name	Nationality	Time	Notes
1	2	4	Sarah Sjöström	Sweden	25.10	Q
2	1	4	Marie Wattel	France	25.63	Q
3	2	5	Louise Hansson	Sweden	25.91	Q
4	1	5	Maaike de Waard	Netherlands	25.97	Q
5	2	2	Anna Dowgiert	Poland	26.03	q
6	1	6	Anna Ntountounaki	Greece	26.11	q
7	2	6	Paulina Peda	Poland	26.16	q
8	1	3	Kim Busch	Netherlands	26.17	q
9	2	3	Silvia Di Pietro	Italy	26.42	
10	2	8	Lana Pudar	Bosnia and Herzegovina	26.56	
11	1	7	Costanza Cocconcelli	Italy	26.64	
12	2	7	Béryl Gastaldello	France	26.69	
13	1	2	Julie Kepp Jensen	Denmark	26.84	
14	1	1	Roos Vanotterdijk	Belgium	26.85	
15	1	8	Elisabeth Ebbesen	Denmark	26.93	
16	2	1	Maria Ugolkova	Switzerland	27.26	

=== Final ===
The final was held on 13 August at 18:17.

Rank	Lane	Name	Nationality	Time	Notes
1st place, gold medalist(s)	4	Sarah Sjöström	Sweden	24.96	
2nd place, silver medalist(s)	5	Marie Wattel	France	25.33	
3rd place, bronze medalist(s)	6	Maaike de Waard	Netherlands	25.62	
4	7	Anna Ntountounaki	Greece	25.83	
5	3	Louise Hansson	Sweden	25.91	
6	1	Paulina Peda	Poland	26.01	
7	8	Kim Busch	Netherlands	26.35	
7	2	Anna Dowgiert	Poland	26.35	
