= Swimming at the 2026 European Aquatics Championships – Women's 50 metre butterfly =

Women's 50 metre butterfly at the 2026 European Aquatics Championships
- Venue: Paris Aquatic Centre
- Dates: 11 August (heats and semifinals); 12 August (final)
- Competitors: 51 from 26 nations
- Winning time: 25.05

Medalists
gold medal	Sarah Sjöström	Sweden
silver medal	Roos Vanotterdijk	Belgium
bronze medal	Sara Junevik	Sweden

The Women's 50 metre butterfly competition of the 2026 European Aquatics Championships was held on 11 and 12 August 2026.

== Records ==
Prior to the competition, the existing world, European and championship records were as follows.

Record	Time	Swimmer	Location	Date
World record	24.43	Sarah Sjöström (SWE)	Borås (Sweden)	05 Jul 2014
European record	24.43	Sarah Sjöström (SWE)	Borås (Sweden)	05 Jul 2014
Championships record	24.87	Sarah Sjöström (SWE)	Berlin (Germany)	18 Aug 2014

== Results ==
=== Heats ===
The heats were started on 11 August at 09:30.
Qualification Rules: The 16 fastest from the heats qualify to the semifinals.

Rank	Heat	Lane	Swimmer	Country	Time	Notes
1	6	4	Sarah Sjöström	Sweden	25.40	Q
2	5	4	Roos Vanotterdijk	Belgium	25.57	Q
3	6	3	Aleksandra Kuznetsova	Neutral Athletes B	25.75	Q
4	4	5	Arina Surkova	Neutral Athletes B	25.77	Q
5	5	5	Sara Junevik	Sweden	25.86	Q
6	4	2	Kim Busch	Netherlands	25.98	Q
7	6	5	Angelina Köhler	Germany	26.02	Q
8	4	1	Albane Cachot	France	26.06	Q
8	5	2	Anita Grishchenko	Neutral Athletes B	26.06	
8	5	7	Louise Hansson	Sweden	26.06	
8	6	6	Tamara Potocká	Slovakia	26.06	Q
12	4	4	Silvia Di Pietro	Italy	26.14	Q
13	4	3	Maaike de Waard	Netherlands	26.18	Q
14	6	8	Flawia Kamzol	Poland	26.21	Q
15	5	3	Mariia Osetrova	Neutral Athletes B	26.25	
16	3	5	Aliisa Soini	Finland	26.32	Q
17	4	0	Elena Capretta	Italy	26.33	Q
18	4	7	Anna Ntountounaki	Greece	26.38	Q
19	5	6	Tessa Giele	Netherlands	26.39	
19	6	2	Martine Damborg	Denmark	26.39	Q
21	5	0	Georgia Damasioti	Greece	26.49	
22	5	1	Lillian Slušná	Slovakia	26.51	
23	6	7	Daryna Nabojčenko	Czech Republic	26.52	
24	4	6	Anastasiya Kuliashova	Neutral Athletes A	26.54	
25	4	8	Anna Avgousta Vlachou	Greece	26.59	
26	2	3	Ellen Walshe	Ireland	26.62	
27	5	8	Sandra Maria Balto	Norway	26.63	
28	2	4	Felicia Klintemar	Sweden	26.64	
29	6	0	Barbora Mileišytė	Lithuania	26.64	
30	4	9	Kalia Antoniou	Cyprus	26.69	
31	3	3	Helena Rosendahl Bach	Denmark	26.70	
32	6	9	Jinth Engelse	Netherlands	26.71	
33	5	9	Costanza Cocconcelli	Italy	26.73	
34	3	0	Wiktoria Piotrowska	Poland	26.84	
35	3	7	Maya Tobehn	Germany	26.86	
36	1	5	Lana Pudar	Bosnia and Herzegovina	26.95	
37	3	1	Yara Fay Riefstahl	Germany	26.96	
38	3	6	Katarzyna Wasick	Poland	27.06	
39	3	9	Gaia Rasmussen	Switzerland	27.09	
40	3	8	Marthe Cecilie Willumsen	Norway	27.13	
41	3	4	Julia Ullmann	Switzerland	27.22	
42	2	1	Ieva Maluka	Latvia	27.25	
43	2	2	Maari Randväli	Estonia	27.34	
44	3	2	Rosalie Phelan	Ireland	27.36	
45	1	3	Varsenik Manucharyan	Armenia	27.40	
46	2	0	Fanny Teijonsalo	Finland	27.45	
47	2	5	Nina Stanisavljević	Serbia	27.52	
48	2	6	Margaret Markvardt	Estonia	27.74	
49	2	7	Alana Burns-Atkin	Ireland	28.01	
50	2	8	Jóhanna Elín Guðmundsdóttir	Iceland	28.02	
51	1	4	Maria Corlateanu	Moldova	30.01	
	6	1	Marie Wattel	France	Did not start	

=== Semifinals ===
The semifinals were started on 11 August at 19:25.
Qualification Rules:The 8 fastest from the semi finals qualify to the finals .

Rank	Heat	Lane	Swimmer	Nation	Time	Notes
1	2	4	Sarah Sjöström	Sweden	25.12	Q
2	1	5	Arina Surkova	Neutral Athletes B	25.44	Q
3	1	4	Roos Vanotterdijk	Belgium	25.45	Q
4	2	3	Sara Junevik	Sweden	25.61	Q
5	1	2	Silvia Di Pietro	Italy	25.76	Q
6	2	2	Tamara Potocká	Slovakia	25.83	Q
7	2	5	Aleksandra Kuznetsova	Neutral Athletes B	25.85	Q
7	2	6	Angelina Köhler	Germany	25.85	Q
9	2	8	Anna Ntountounaki	Greece	25.95	
10	1	6	Albane Cachot	France	25.97	
11	2	7	Maaike de Waard	Netherlands	26.05	
12	1	3	Kim Busch	Netherlands	26.09	
13	1	7	Flawia Kamzol	Poland	26.16	
14	2	1	Aliisa Soini	Finland	26.24	
15	1	1	Elena Capretta	Italy	26.42	
16	1	8	Martine Damborg	Denmark	26.60	

=== Final ===
The final was held on 12 August at 18:47.

Rank	Lane	Swimmer	Nation	Time	Notes
1st place, gold medalist(s)	4	Sarah Sjöström	Sweden	25.05	
2nd place, silver medalist(s)	3	Roos Vanotterdijk	Belgium	25.12	
3rd place, bronze medalist(s)	6	Sara Junevik	Sweden	25.51	
4	5	Arina Surkova	Neutral Athletes B	25.53	
5	1	Aleksandra Kuznetsova	Neutral Athletes B	25.55	
6	8	Angelina Köhler	Germany	25.72	
7	7	Tamara Potocká	Slovakia	25.86	
8	2	Silvia Di Pietro	Italy	25.97	
