= Swimming at the 2026 European Aquatics Championships – Women's 100 metre butterfly =

Women's 100 metre butterfly at the 2026 European Aquatics Championships
- Venue: Paris Aquatic Centre
- Dates: 13 August (heats and semifinals); 14 August (final)
- Competitors: 46 from 26 nations
- Winning time: 56.08

Medalists
gold medal	Roos Vanotterdijk	Belgium
silver medal	Angelina Köhler	Germany
bronze medal	Daria Klepikova

The Women's 100 metre butterfly competition of the 2026 European Aquatics Championships was held on 13 and 14 August 2026.

== Records ==
Prior to the competition, the existing world, European and championship records were as follows.

Record	Time	Swimmer	Location	Date
World record	54.33	Gretchen Walsh (USA)	Fort Lauderdale	2 May 2026
European record	55.48	Sarah Sjöström (SWE)	Rio de Janeiro	7 August 2016
Championships record	55.89	Sarah Sjöström (SWE)	London	20 May 2016

== Results ==
=== Heats ===
The heats were started on 13 August at 10:04.
Qualification Rules: The 16 fastest from the heats qualify to the semifinals.

Rank	Heat	Lane	Swimmer	Country	Time	Notes
1	5	4	Roos Vanotterdijk	Belgium	56.76	Q
2	4	4	Angelina Köhler	Germany	56.77	Q
3	1	7	Barbora Seemanová	Czech Republic	57.43	Q, NR
4	3	4	Daria Klepikova	Neutral Athletes B	57.56	Q
5	4	3	Louise Hansson	Sweden	57.67	Q
6	4	6	Anastasiya Kuliashova	Neutral Athletes A	57.85	Q
7	3	5	Tamara Potocká	Slovakia	57.92	Q
8	5	3	Georgia Damasioti	Greece	57.94	Q
9	3	3	Keanna Macinnes	Great Britain	58.02	Q
10	4	5	Anna Ntountounaki	Greece	58.18	Q
11	5	2	Helena Rosendahl Bach	Denmark	58.22	Q
12	5	5	Tessa Giele	Netherlands	58.35	Q
13	5	9	Lana Pudar	Bosnia and Herzegovina	58.45	Q
14	5	8	Aliisa Soini	Finland	58.55	Q
15	3	1	Zuzanna Famulok	Poland	58.58	Q
15	4	2	Anita Gastaldi	Italy	58.58	Q
17	2	3	Felicia Klintemar	Sweden	58.83	
17	3	7	Sara Junevik	Sweden	58.83	
19	4	8	Emily Richards	Great Britain	58.88	
20	5	1	Laura Cabanes	Spain	58.90	
21	4	7	Amina Kajtaz	Croatia	58.98	
22	5	6	Costanza Cocconcelli	Italy	59.10	
23	2	7	Sandra Maria Balto	Norway	59.18	
24	1	3	Kim Busch	Netherlands	59.28	
25	3	2	Yara Fay Riefstahl	Germany	59.42	
26	4	1	Iris Julia Berger	Austria	59.44	
27	5	0	Paola Borrelli	Italy	59.48	
28	3	6	Marie Wattel	France	59.62	
29	3	0	Flawia Kamzol	Poland	59.64	
30	2	4	Ana Nizharadze	Georgia	59.66	
31	4	9	Julia Ullmann	Switzerland	59.67	
32	3	8	Wiktoria Piotrowska	Poland	59.78	
33	5	7	Martine Damborg	Denmark	59.96	
34	2	2	Femke Spiering	Netherlands	59.98	
35	3	9	Anna Avgousta Vlachou	Greece	1:00.04	
36	1	2	Varsenik Manucharyan	Armenia	1:00.09	
37	2	6	Marthe Cecilie Willumsen	Norway	1:00.13	
38	2	9	Laura Lahtinen	Finland	1:00.42	
39	2	5	Evy Rozeboom	Netherlands	1:00.43	
40	4	0	Barbara Leśniewska	Poland	1:00.54	
41	1	5	Nina Stanisavljević	Serbia	1:00.55	
42	1	6	Daryna Nabojčenkova	Czech Republic	1:00.82	
43	1	4	Gaia Rasmussen	Switzerland	1:00.84	
44	2	0	Margaret Markvardt	Estonia	1:01.20	
45	2	8	Alana Burns-Atkin	Ireland	1:01.34	
46	2	1	Maari Randvali	Estonia	1:01.48	

=== Semifinals ===
The semifinals were started on 13 August at 18:51.

Rank	Heat	Lane	Swimmer	Nation	Time	Notes
1	2	4	Roos Vanotterdijk	Belgium	55.89	Q, =CR
2	1	4	Angelina Köhler	Germany	56.79	Q
3	2	2	Anna Ntountounaki	Greece	56.99	Q
4	2	5	Daria Klepikova	Neutral Athletes B	57.30	Q
5	1	6	Keanna Macinnes	Great Britain	57.31	Q
6	1	3	Tamara Potocká	Slovakia	57.37	Q
7	2	3	Anastasiya Kuliashova	Neutral Athletes A	57.63	Q
8	2	6	Georgia Damasioti	Greece	57.87	Q
9	1	1	Anita Gastaldi	Italy	57.92	
10	1	8	Emily Richards	Great Britain	57.94	
11	1	5	Louise Hansson	Sweden	58.08	
12	1	2	Helena Rosendahl Bach	Denmark	58.35	
13	1	7	Aliisa Soini	Finland	58.56	
14	2	1	Zuzanna Famulok	Poland	58.84	
15	2	8	Felicia Klintemar	Sweden	59.00	
16	2	7	Tessa Giele	Netherlands	59.65	

=== Final ===
The final was held on 14 August at 18:30.

Rank	Lane	Name	Nationality	Time	Notes
1st place, gold medalist(s)	4	Roos Vanotterdijk	Belgium	56.08	
2nd place, silver medalist(s)	5	Angelina Köhler	Germany	56.39	
3rd place, bronze medalist(s)	6	Daria Klepikova	Neutral Athletes B	56.76	
4	3	Anna Ntountounaki	Greece	57.10	
5	2	Keanna Macinnes	Great Britain	57.25	
6	1	Anastasiya Kuliashova	Neutral Athletes A	57.57	
7	7	Tamara Potocká	Slovakia	57.58	
8	8	Georgia Damasioti	Greece	57.72	
