= Swimming at the 2024 European Aquatics Championships – Women's 100 metre butterfly =

Sporting Event

Women's 100 metre butterfly at the 2024 European Aquatics Championships
- Venue: Sports Centre Milan Gale Muškatirović
- Dates: 20 June (heats and semifinals); 21 June (final)
- Competitors: 29 from 19 nations
- Winning time: 57.47

Medalists
gold medal	Roos Vanotterdijk	Belgium
silver medal	Georgia Damasioti	Greece
bronze medal	Sara Junevik	Sweden

The Women's 100 metre butterfly competition of the 2024 European Aquatics Championships was held on 20 and 21 June 2024.

== Records ==
Prior to the competition, the existing world, European and championship records were as follows.

	Name	Nationality	Time	Location	Date
World record	Gretchen Walsh	United States	55.18	Indianapolis	15 June 2024
European record	Sarah Sjöström	Sweden	55.48	Rio de Janeiro	7 August 2016
Championship record	Sarah Sjöström	Sweden	55.89	London	20 May 2016

== Results ==
=== Heats ===
The heats were started on 20 June at 09:55.
Qualification Rules: The 16 fastest from the heats qualify to the semifinals.

Rank	Heat	Lane	Name	Nationality	Time	Notes
1	4	5	Paulina Peda	Poland	58.14	Q
2	3	3	Roos Vanotterdijk	Belgium	58.45	Q
3	4	6	Georgia Damasioti	Greece	58.54	Q
4	3	5	Sara Junevik	Sweden	58.82	Q
5	3	4	Anna Ntountounaki	Greece	58.83	Q
6	2	4	Helena Rosendahl Bach	Denmark	58.90	Q
7	2	5	Wiktoria Piotrowska	Poland	59.10	Q
8	4	3	Amina Kajtaz	Croatia	59.15	Q
9	3	6	Lucy Grieve	Great Britain	59.23	Q
10	2	3	Panna Ugrai	Hungary	59.48	Q
11	4	4	Lana Pudar	Bosnia and Herzegovina	59.54	Q
12	4	1	Zuzanna Famulok	Poland	59.59	
13	3	2	Julia Ullmann	Switzerland	59.68	Q
14	2	7	Laura Lahtinen	Finland	59.72	Q
15	3	7	Aliisa Soini	Finland	59.73	Q
16	2	2	Iris Julia Berger	Austria	59.85	Q
17	4	7	Ariel Hayon	Israel	59.94	Q
18	4	2	Julia Maik	Poland	1:00.37	
19	4	8	Edith Jernstedt	Sweden	1:00.43	
20	3	1	Schastine Tabor	Denmark	1:01.19	
21	2	8	Fabienne Pavlik	Austria	1:01.22	
22	3	8	Zora Ripková	Slovakia	1:01.25	
23	1	4	Daryna Nabojčenko	Czech Republic	1:01.26	
24	3	0	Varsenik Manucharyan	Armenia	1:01.48	
25	2	1	Hana Sekuti	Slovenia	1:01.96	
26	2	0	Mariam Sheikhalizadeh	Azerbaijan	1:02.55	
27	1	5	Fanny Borer	Switzerland	1:03.88	
28	4	9	Mia Blaževska Eminova	North Macedonia	1:04.13	
29	1	3	Yeva Karapetyan	Armenia	1:04.71	
	2	6	Lora Komoróczy	Hungary	DNS	
	4	0	Mina Kaljević	Serbia	DNS	

=== Semifinals ===
The semifinals were started on 20 June at 18:51.
Qualification Rules: The first 2 competitors of each semifinal and the remaining fastest (up to a total of 8 qualified competitors) from the semifinals advance to the final.

Rank	Heat	Lane	Name	Nationality	Time	Notes
1	1	4	Roos Vanotterdijk	Belgium	57.89	Q
2	2	5	Georgia Damasioti	Greece	58.00	Q
3	1	5	Sara Junevik	Sweden	58.23	Q
4	1	3	Helena Rosendahl Bach	Denmark	58.24	Q
5	2	3	Anna Ntountounaki	Greece	58.41	Q
6	2	4	Paulina Peda	Poland	58.47	Q
7	1	6	Amina Kajtaz	Croatia	58.55	Q
8	2	7	Lana Pudar	Bosnia and Herzegovina	58.63	Q
9	2	6	Wiktoria Piotrowska	Poland	58.69	
10	2	8	Ariel Hayon	Israel	58.78	
11	1	1	Iris Julia Berger	Austria	58.94	
12	2	2	Lucy Grieve	Great Britain	59.07	
13	1	2	Panna Ugrai	Hungary	59.10	
14	1	7	Julia Ullmann	Switzerland	59.32	
15	2	1	Aliisa Soini	Finland	59.61	
16	1	8	Edith Jernstedt	Sweden	59.78	

=== Final ===
The final was held on 21 June at 18:30.

Rank	Lane	Name	Nationality	Time	Notes
1st place, gold medalist(s)	4	Roos Vanotterdijk	Belgium	57.47	NR
2nd place, silver medalist(s)	5	Georgia Damasioti	Greece	57.74	
3rd place, bronze medalist(s)	3	Sara Junevik	Sweden	58.06	
4	6	Helena Rosendahl Bach	Denmark	58.27	
5	2	Anna Ntountounaki	Greece	58.34	
6	1	Amina Kajtaz	Croatia	58.79	
7	7	Paulina Peda	Poland	58.82	
8	8	Lana Pudar	Bosnia and Herzegovina	59.01	
