= Swimming at the 2024 European Aquatics Championships – Women's 50 metre butterfly =

Women's 50 metre butterfly at the 2024 European Aquatics Championships
- Venue: Sports Centre Milan Gale Muškatirović
- Dates: 18 June (heats and semifinals); 19 June (final)
- Winning time: 25.68

Medalists
gold medal	Sara Junevik	Sweden
silver medal	Roos Vanotterdijk	Belgium
bronze medal	Anna Ntountounaki	Greece

The Women's 50 metre butterfly competition of the 2024 European Aquatics Championships was held on 18 and 19 June 2024.

== Records ==
Prior to the competition, the existing world, European and championship records were as follows.

	Name	Nationality	Time	Location	Date
World record European record	Sarah Sjöström	Sweden	24.43	Borås	5 July 2014
Championship record	Sarah Sjöström	Sweden	24.87	Berlin	18 August 2014

== Results ==
=== Heats ===
The heats were started on 18 June at 09:30.
Qualification Rules: The 16 fastest from the heats qualify to the semifinals.

Rank	Heat	Lane	Name	Nationality	Time	Notes
1	4	4	Sara Junevik	Sweden	26.01	Q
2	2	6	Tamara Potocká	Slovakia	26.12	Q, NR
3	2	3	Jana Pavalić	Croatia	26.25	Q
4	2	4	Anna Ntountounaki	Greece	26.28	Q
4	4	6	Julie Kepp Jensen	Denmark	26.28	Q
6	4	5	Paulina Peda	Poland	26.31	Q
7	3	3	Anna Dowgiert	Poland	26.32	Q
7	4	2	Roos Vanotterdijk	Belgium	26.32	Q
9	2	5	Emilie Beckmann	Denmark	26.52	Q
9	3	2	Jessica Felsner	Germany	26.52	Q
11	3	6	Elisabeth Ebbesen	Denmark	26.61	
12	2	7	Wiktoria Piotrowska	Poland	26.66	
13	4	3	Julia Maik	Poland	26.67	
14	2	2	Ariel Hayon	Israel	26.72	Q
15	3	5	Daryna Nabojčenko	Czech Republic	26.75	Q
15	4	7	Mariangela Boitsuk	Estonia	26.75	Q
17	3	1	Lora Komoróczy	Hungary	26.86	Q
18	3	7	Lillian Slušná	Slovakia	26.99	Q
19	4	1	Julia Ullmann	Switzerland	27.09	Q
20	2	1	Aliisa Soini	Finland	27.23	
21	2	8	Mina Kaljević	Serbia	27.36	
22	4	0	Edith Jernstedt	Sweden	27.38	
23	4	8	Nina Stanisavljević	Serbia	27.46	
24	3	9	Mia Pentti	Finland	27.66	
25	2	0	Jóhanna Elín Guðmundsdóttir	Iceland	27.99	
26	4	9	Anna Hadjiloizou	Cyprus	28.02	
27	3	0	Mariam Sheikhalizadeh	Azerbaijan	28.04	
28	1	4	Varsenik Manucharyan	Armenia	28.16	
29	1	3	Yeva Karapetyan	Armenia	29.33	
30	1	5	Arla Dermishi	Albania	29.82	
	3	4	Neža Klančar	Slovenia	DNS	
	3	8	Kalia Antoniou	Cyprus	DNS	

=== Semifinals ===
The semifinals were started on 18 June at 19:12.
Qualification Rules: The 16 fastest from the heats qualify to the semifinals.

Rank	Heat	Lane	Name	Nationality	Time	Notes
1	2	4	Sara Junevik	Sweden	25.84	Q
2	1	5	Anna Ntountounaki	Greece	26.12	Q
3	1	6	Roos Vanotterdijk	Belgium	26.23	Q
4	1	3	Paulina Peda	Poland	26.24	Q
5	1	4	Tamara Potocká	Slovakia	26.33	Q
5	2	3	Julie Kepp Jensen	Denmark	26.33	Q
7	2	5	Jana Pavalić	Croatia	26.38	Q
8	2	6	Anna Dowgiert	Poland	26.43	Q
9	1	7	Daryna Nabojčenko	Czech Republic	26.58	
9	2	8	Lillian Slušná	Slovakia	26.58	
11	2	7	Ariel Hayon	Israel	26.59	
12	2	2	Emilie Beckmann	Denmark	26.64	
13	1	8	Julia Ullmann	Switzerland	26.78	
14	1	2	Jessica Felsner	Germany	26.82	
15	1	1	Lora Komoróczy	Hungary	26.83	
16	2	1	Mariangela Boitsuk	Estonia	26.88	

=== Final ===
The final was held on 19 June at 18:47.

Rank	Lane	Name	Nationality	Time	Notes
1st place, gold medalist(s)	4	Sara Junevik	Sweden	25.68	
2nd place, silver medalist(s)	3	Roos Vanotterdijk	Belgium	26.08	
3rd place, bronze medalist(s)	5	Anna Ntountounaki	Greece	26.18	
4	2	Tamara Potocká	Slovakia	26.21	
5	7	Julie Kepp Jensen	Denmark	26.22	
6	6	Paulina Peda	Poland	26.25	
7	1	Jana Pavalić	Croatia	26.26	
8	8	Anna Dowgiert	Poland	26.58	
