= Swimming at the 2024 European Aquatics Championships – Women's 50 metre backstroke =

Women's 50 metre backstroke at the 2024 European Aquatics Championships
- Venue: Sports Centre Milan Gale Muškatirović
- Dates: 19 June (heats and semifinals); 20 June (final)
- Winning time: 27.73

Medalists
gold medal	Danielle Hill	Ireland
silver medal	Theodora Drakou	Greece
bronze medal	Adela Piskorska	Poland

The Women's 50 metre backstroke competition of the 2024 European Aquatics Championships was held on 21 and 22 June 2024.

== Records ==
Prior to the competition, the existing world, European and championship records were as follows.

	Name	Nationality	Time	Location	Date
World record	Kaylee McKeown	Australia	26.86	Budapest	20 October 2023
European record	Kira Toussaint	Netherlands	27.10	Eindhoven	10 April 2021
Championship record	Kathleen Dawson	Great Britain	27.19	Budapest	18 May 2021

== Results ==
=== Heats ===
The heats were started on 19 June at 10:04.
Qualification Rules: The 16 fastest from the heats qualify to the semifinals.

Rank	Heat	Lane	Name	Nationality	Time	Notes
1	3	4	Danielle Hill	Ireland	27.98	Q
2	1	4	Theodora Drakou	Greece	28.11	Q
3	2	4	Adela Piskorska	Poland	28.16	Q
4	3	3	Fanny Teijonsalo	Finland	28.35	Q
5	3	5	Lora Komoróczy	Hungary	28.47	Q
6	1	3	Nika Sharafutdinova	Ukraine	28.65	Q
7	1	5	Paulina Peda	Poland	28.66	Q
=8	2	5	Julie Kepp Jensen	Denmark	28.95	Q
=8	3	7	Justine Murdock	Lithuania	28.95	Q
10	2	3	Barbora Janíčková	Czech Republic	29.00	Q
11	1	6	Katarina Milutinović	Serbia	29.05	Q
12	2	2	Katalin Burian	Hungary	29.13	Q
13	3	0	Tamara Potocká	Slovakia	29.16	Q
14	3	6	Nina Stanisavljević	Serbia	29.17	Q
15	2	6	Mia Pentti	Finland	29.29	Q
16	2	7	Lottie Cullen	Ireland	29.30	Q
=17	1	1	Gabriela Georgieva	Bulgaria	29.62	
=17	3	2	Teresa Ivan	Slovakia	29.62	
19	2	8	Tom Mienis	Israel	29.73	
20	1	2	Jana Marković	Serbia	29.80	
21	2	1	Laura Bernat	Poland	29.90	
22	1	7	Mariangela Boitsuk	Estonia	29.91	
23	1	8	Tatiana Salcuțan	Moldova	29.93	
24	3	8	Elisabeth Erlendsdóttir	Faroe Islands	30.09	
25	2	0	Diana Musayelyan	Armenia	31.87	
	3	1	Aviv Barzelay	Israel	Did not start	

=== Semifinals ===
The semifinal were started on 19 June at 19:27.
Qualification Rules: The first 2 competitors of each semifinal and the remaining fastest (up to a total of 8 qualified competitors) from the semifinals advance to the final.

Rank	Heat	Lane	Name	Nationality	Time	Notes
1	2	5	Danielle Hill	Ireland	27.67	Q
2	2	4	Theodora Drakou	Greece	27.99	Q
3	1	5	Fanny Teijonsalo	Finland	28.08	Q
4	1	2	Adela Piskorska	Poland	28.16	Q
5	2	3	Julie Kepp Jensen	Denmark	28.19	Q
6	1	4	Lora Komoróczy	Hungary	28.30	Q
7	2	2	Nika Sharafutdinova	Ukraine	28.64	Q
8	1	3	Paulina Peda	Poland	28.65	Q
=9	2	6	Justine Murdock	Lithuania	28.75	NR
=9	1	6	Katarina Milutinović	Serbia	28.75	
11	2	7	Katalin Burian	Hungary	28.91	
12	2	1	Barbora Janíčková	Czech Republic	28.96	
13	1	8	Lottie Cullen	Ireland	28.97	
14	2	8	Nina Stanisavljević	Serbia	29.20	
15	1	7	Mia Pentti	Finland	29.26	
16	1	1	Tamara Potocká	Slovakia	29.43	

=== Final ===
The final was held on 20 June at 18:36.

Rank	Lane	Name	Nationality	Time	Notes
1st place, gold medalist(s)	4	Danielle Hill	Ireland	27.73	
2nd place, silver medalist(s)	5	Theodora Drakou	Greece	27.87	
3rd place, bronze medalist(s)	6	Adela Piskorska	Poland	28.00	
4	7	Lora Komoróczy	Hungary	28.02	
5	2	Julie Kepp Jensen	Denmark	28.34	
6	3	Fanny Teijonsalo	Finland	28.36	
7	1	Nika Sharafutdinova	Ukraine	28.82	
8	8	Justine Murdock	Lithuania	28.86	
