= Swimming at the 2024 European Aquatics Championships – Women's 100 metre backstroke =

Women's 100 metre backstroke at the 2024 European Aquatics Championships
- Venue: Sports Centre Milan Gale Muškatirović
- Dates: 21 June (heats and semifinals); 22 June (final)
- Winning time: 59.79

Medalists
gold medal	Adela Piskorska	Poland
silver medal	Danielle Hill	Ireland
bronze medal	Roos Vanotterdijk	Belgium

The Women's 100 metre backstroke competition of the 2024 European Aquatics Championships was held on 21 and 22 June 2024.

== Records ==
Prior to the competition, the existing world, European and championship records were as follows.

	Name	Nationality	Time	Location	Date
World record	Regan Smith	United States	57.13	Indianapolis	18 June 2024
European record	Kathleen Dawson	United Kingdom	58.08	Budapest	23 May 2021
Championship record	Kathleen Dawson	United Kingdom	58.08	Budapest	23 May 2021

== Results ==
=== Heats ===
The heats were started on 21 June at 09:51.
Qualification Rules: The 16 fastest from the heats qualify to the semifinals.

Rank	Heat	Lane	Name	Nationality	Time	Notes
1	3	4	Danielle Hill	Ireland	1:00.62	Q
2	3	5	Hanna Rosvall	Sweden	1:00.88	Q
3	1	4	Roos Vanotterdijk	Belgium	1:01.06	Q
4	2	4	Adela Piskorska	Poland	1:01.16	Q
5	1	2	Nika Sharafutdinova	Ukraine	1:01.63	Q
6	2	3	Lora Komoróczy	Hungary	1:01.77	Q
7	2	2	Justine Murdock	Lithuania	1:01.98	Q
8	2	1	Fanny Teijonsalo	Finland	1:01.99	Q
9	3	3	Dóra Molnár	Hungary	1:02.03	Q
10	1	5	Lottie Cullen	Ireland	1:02.54	Q
11	3	7	Holly McGill	Great Britain	1:02.62	Q
12	2	0	Katarina Milutinović	Serbia	1:02.71	Q
13	1	1	Tom Mienis	Israel	1:03.02	Q
14	2	7	Laura Bernat	Poland	1:03.15	Q
15	2	8	Tatiana Salcuțan	Moldova	1:03.19	Q
16	2	6	Gabriela Georgieva	Bulgaria	1:03.31	Q
17	3	8	Iris Julia Berger	Austria	1:03.37	
18	1	7	Karoline Sørensen	Denmark	1:03.58	
19	1	8	Lena Grabowski	Austria	1:05.62	
20	2	9	Mia Krstevska	North Macedonia	1:06.58	
21	1	0	Elisabeth Erlendsdóttir	Faroe Islands	1:06.59	
22	3	9	Diana Musayelyan	Armenia	1:09.54	
	1	3	Schastine Tabor	Denmark	Did not start	
	1	6	Katalin Burián	Hungary	Did not start	
	2	5	Paulina Peda	Poland	Did not start	
	3	0	Jana Marković	Serbia	Did not start	
	3	1	Janja Šegel	Slovenia	Did not start	
	3	2	Aviv Barzelay	Israel	Did not start	
	3	6	Ayla Spitz	Israel	Did not start	

=== Semifinals ===
The semifinal were started on 21 June at 18:50.
Qualification Rules: The first 2 competitors of each semifinal and the remaining fastest (up to a total of 8 qualified competitors) from the semifinals advance to the final.

Rank	Heat	Lane	Name	Nationality	Time	Notes
1	2	5	Roos Vanotterdijk	Belgium	1:00.42	Q
2	2	4	Danielle Hill	Ireland	1:00.52	Q
3	1	5	Adela Piskorska	Poland	1:00.71	Q
4	1	2	Lottie Cullen	Ireland	1:01.19	Q
5	2	3	Nika Sharafutdinova	Ukraine	1:01.20	Q
6	1	4	Hanna Rosvall	Sweden	1:01.22	Q
7	2	2	Dóra Molnár	Hungary	1:01.39	Q
8	1	3	Lora Komoróczy	Hungary	1:01.51	Q
9	2	6	Justine Murdock	Lithuania	1:01.59	
10	1	6	Fanny Teijonsalo	Finland	1:01.82	
11	2	7	Holly McGill	Great Britain	1:01.95	
12	2	1	Tom Mienis	Israel	1:02.96	
13	1	8	Gabriela Georgieva	Bulgaria	1:03.05	
14	2	8	Tatiana Salcuțan	Moldova	1:03.27	
15	1	7	Katarina Milutinović	Serbia	1:03.55	
16	1	1	Laura Bernat	Poland	1:03.57	

=== Final ===
The final was held on 22 June at 20:07.

Rank	Lane	Name	Nationality	Time	Notes
1st place, gold medalist(s)	3	Adela Piskorska	Poland	59.79	
2nd place, silver medalist(s)	5	Danielle Hill	Ireland	1:00.19	
3rd place, bronze medalist(s)	4	Roos Vanotterdijk	Belgium	1:00.58	
4	2	Nika Sharafutdinova	Ukraine	1:00.91	
5	6	Lottie Cullen	Ireland	1:01.03	
6	8	Lora Komoróczy	Hungary	1:01.36	
7	7	Hanna Rosvall	Sweden	1:01.39	
8	1	Dóra Molnár	Hungary	1:01.46	
