= Swimming at the 2024 World Aquatics Championships – Women's 100 metre butterfly =

Women's 100 metre butterfly at the 2024 World Aquatics Championships
- Venue: Aspire Dome
- Location: Doha, Qatar
- Dates: 11 February (heats and semifinals); 12 February (final)
- Competitors: 46 from 44 nations
- Winning time: 56.28

Medalists
gold medal	Angelina Köhler	Germany
silver medal	Claire Curzan	United States
bronze medal	Louise Hansson	Sweden

The Women's 100 metre butterfly competition at the 2024 World Aquatics Championships was held on 11 and 12 February 2024.

== Qualification ==
Each National Federation was permitted to enter a maximum of two qualified athletes in each individual event, but only if both of them had attained the "A" standard qualification time at approved qualifying events. For this event, the "A" standard qualification time was 58.33 seconds. Federations could enter one athlete into the event if they met the "B" standard qualification time. For this event, the "B" standard qualification time was 1:00.37. Athletes could also enter the event if they had met an "A" or "B" standard in a different event and their Federation had not entered anyone else. Additional considerations applied to Federations who had few swimmers enter through the standard qualification times. Federations in this category could at least enter two men and two women into the competition, all of whom could enter into up to two events.

== Records ==
Prior to the competition, the existing world and championship records were as follows.

World record	Sarah Sjöström (SWE)	55.48	Rio de Janeiro, Brazil	7 August 2016
Competition record	Sarah Sjöström (SWE)	55.53	Budapest, Hungary	24 July 2017

== Results ==
=== Heats ===
The heats were started on 11 February at 10:18.

Rank	Heat	Lane	Name	Nationality	Time	Notes
1	3	4	Angelina Köhler	Germany	56.41	Q, NR
2	4	4	Louise Hansson	Sweden	57.45	Q
3	3	5	Erin Gallagher	South Africa	57.59	Q, AF
4	5	5	Brianna Throssell	Australia	57.78	Q
5	5	4	Claire Curzan	United States	57.94	Q
6	4	5	Alexandria Perkins	Australia	58.10	Q
7	5	6	Chiharu Iitsuka	Japan	58.35	Q
8	5	3	Barbora Seemanová	Czech Republic	58.37	Q
9	4	2	Helena Rosendahl Bach	Denmark	58.67	Q
10	4	3	Anna Ntountounaki	Greece	58.72	Q
11	4	6	Nagisa Ikemoto	Japan	58.73	Q
12	4	0	Anastasiya Kuliashova	Neutral Independent Athletes	58.94	Q
13	3	7	Farida Osman	Egypt	59.11	Q
14	5	2	Amina Kajtaz	Croatia	59.14	Q
15	3	3	Katerine Savard	Canada	59.24	Q
16	3	1	Park Jung-won	South Korea	59.32	Q
17	3	6	Paulina Peda	Poland	59.47	
18	3	2	Quah Jing Wen	Singapore	59.61	
19	4	1	Paula Juste	Spain	59.82	
20	4	9	Gong Zhenqi	China	59.87	
21	4	7	Mariana Pacheco	Portugal	59.93	
22	5	9	Laura Lahtinen	Finland	1:00.06	
23	5	1	Valentina Becerra	Colombia	1:00.34	
24	3	8	Sofia Spodarenko	Kazakhstan	1:00.39	
24	4	8	María José Mata Cocco	Mexico	1:00.39	
26	5	8	Natalie Kan	Hong Kong	1:00.50	
27	5	7	Sonia Laquintana	Italy	1:01.31	
28	3	0	Kamonchanok Kwanmuang	Thailand	1:01.45	
29	3	9	Jessica Calderbank	Jamaica	1:01.82	
30	5	0	Luana Alonso	Paraguay	1:02.33	
31	2	5	Varsenik Manucharyan	Armenia	1:02.59	
32	2	3	Ana Nizharadze	Georgia	1:03.28	
33	2	6	Oumy Diop	Senegal	1:03.97	
34	2	7	Lia Lima	Angola	1:03.98	
35	2	2	Imara Thorpe	Kenya	1:04.81	
36	2	8	María Fernández	Dominican Republic	1:05.08	
37	2	1	Cheang Weng Chi	Macau	1:05.11	
38	2	0	Rebecca Najem	Lebanon	1:05.57	
39	1	7	Mia Laban	Cook Islands	1:07.35	
40	2	9	Amaya Bollinger	Guam	1:08.15	
41	1	4	Sara Akasha	United Arab Emirates	1:11.72	
42	1	5	Naekeisha Louis	Saint Lucia	1:14.92	
43	1	6	Sonia Khatun	Bangladesh	1:17.86	
44	1	3	Amylia Chali	Tanzania	1:19.92	
45	1	2	Leena Mohamedahmed	Sudan	1:36.65	
	2	4	María Schutzmeier	Nicaragua	Did not start	

=== Semifinals ===
The semifinals were started on 11 February at 19:12.

Rank	Heat	Lane	Name	Nationality	Time	Notes
1	2	4	Angelina Köhler	Germany	56.11	Q, NR
2	2	3	Claire Curzan	United States	57.06	Q
3	1	5	Brianna Throssell	Australia	57.22	Q
4	1	4	Louise Hansson	Sweden	57.28	Q
5	1	2	Anna Ntountounaki	Greece	57.86	Q
6	2	5	Erin Gallagher	South Africa	57.92	Q
7	2	6	Chiharu Iitsuka	Japan	58.01	Q
8	1	3	Alexandria Perkins	Australia	58.05	Q
9	2	2	Helena Rosendahl Bach	Denmark	58.15	
10	1	6	Barbora Seemanová	Czech Republic	58.28	
11	2	7	Nagisa Ikemoto	Japan	58.61	
12	2	8	Katerine Savard	Canada	58.73	
13	1	8	Park Jung-won	South Korea	58.75	
14	1	7	Anastasiya Kuliashova	Neutral Independent Athletes	59.03	
15	2	1	Farida Osman	Egypt	59.12	
16	1	1	Amina Kajtaz	Croatia	59.22	

=== Final ===
The final was held on 12 February at 19:09.

Rank	Lane	Name	Nationality	Time	Notes
1st place, gold medalist(s)	4	Angelina Köhler	Germany	56.28	
2nd place, silver medalist(s)	5	Claire Curzan	United States	56.61	
3rd place, bronze medalist(s)	6	Louise Hansson	Sweden	56.94	
4	3	Brianna Throssell	Australia	56.97	
5	2	Anna Ntountounaki	Greece	57.62	
6	8	Alexandria Perkins	Australia	57.68	
7	7	Erin Gallagher	South Africa	57.83	
8	1	Chiharu Iitsuka	Japan	58.23	

== Sources ==
- "Competition Regulations" (PDF). World Aquatics. Archived (PDF) from the original on 15 February 2026.
