= Swimming at the 2026 European Aquatics Championships – Women's 200 metre individual medley =

Women's 200 metre individual medley at the 2026 European Aquatics Championships
- Venue: Paris Aquatic Centre
- Dates: 13 August 2026 (heats and semifinals); 14 August 2026 (final)
- Competitors: 24 from 15 nations

Medalists
| gold medal | Ellen Walshe | Ireland |
| silver medal | Anita Gastaldi | Italy |
| bronze medal | Roos Vanotterdijk | Belgium |

The Women's 200 metre individual medley competition of the 2026 European Aquatics Championships will be held on 14 and 15 August 2026.

== Records ==
Prior to the competition, the existing world, European and championship records were as follows:

| Record | Mark | Swimmer | Venue | Date |
|---|---|---|---|---|
| World record | 2:05.70 | Summer McIntosh (CAN) | (Canada) Victoria | 9 June 2025 |
| European record | 2:06.12 | Katinka Hosszú (HUN) | (Russia) Kazan | 3 August 2015 |
| Championship record | 2:07.30 | Katinka Hosszú (HUN) | (United Kingdom) London | 19 May 2016 |

== Results ==
=== Heats ===
The heats were started on 14 August at 10:34.

| Rank | Heat | Lane | Swimmer | Nation | Time | Notes |
|---|---|---|---|---|---|---|
| 1 | 2 | 4 | Anastasia Gorbenko | Israel | 2:11.87 | Q |
| 2 | 2 | 5 | Ellen Walshe | Ireland | 2:12.12 | Q |
| 3 | 3 | 4 | Abbie Wood | Great Britain | 2:12.23 | Q |
| 4 | 3 | 5 | Amalie Smith | Great Britain | 2:12.45 | Q |
| 5 | 1 | 5 | Anita Gastaldi | Italy | 2:12.57 | Q |
| 6 | 2 | 7 | Justina Kozan | Poland | 2:12.67 | Q |
| 7 | 3 | 7 | Nikoletta Pavlopoulou | Greece | 2:13.38 | Q |
| 8 | 1 | 3 | Lea Polonsky | Israel | 2:13.43 | Q |
| 9 | 3 | 3 | Alba Vázquez | Spain | 2:13.51 | Q |
| 10 | 1 | 4 | Roos Vanotterdijk | Belgium | 2:13.83 | Q |
| 11 | 2 | 3 | Chiara Della Corte | Italy | 2:13.85 | Q |
| 12 | 2 | 2 | Ellie McCartney | Ireland | 2:13.95 | Q |
| 13 | 3 | 2 | Linda Roth | Germany | 2:15.01 | Q |
| 14 | 1 | 2 | Clara Rybak-Andersen | Denmark | 2:15.02 | Q |
| 15 | 1 | 7 | Hanna Bergman | Sweden | 2:15.07 | Q |
| 16 | 3 | 1 | Ieva Maļuka | Latvia | 2:15.55 | Q |
| 17 | 3 | 6 | Noelle Benkler | Germany | 2:15.56 | |
| 18 | 2 | 6 | Anna Pirovano | Italy | 2:15.97 | |
| 19 | 2 | 1 | Angelina Patt | Switzerland | 2:16.65 | |
| 20 | 1 | 6 | Barbara Leśniewska | Poland | 2:16.67 | |
| 21 | 1 | 1 | Tea Windblad | Sweden | 2:18.58 | |
| 22 | 2 | 8 | Nida Omid | Austria | 2:18.86 | |
| 23 | 3 | 8 | Aviva Hollinsky | Austria | 2:19.02 | |
| 24 | 1 | 8 | Emma Barthel | Luxembourg | 2:19.63 | |

=== Semifinals ===
The semifinals were started on 14 August at 19:35.
Qualification Rules: The fastest 8 qualified competitors from the semifinals advance to the final.

| Rank | Heat | Lane | Name | Nationality | Time | Notes |
|---|---|---|---|---|---|---|
| 1 | 2 | 5 | Abbie Wood | Great Britain | 2:09.99 | Q |
| 2 | 2 | 2 | Alba Vázquez | Spain | 2:10.87 | Q |
| 3 | 1 | 5 | Amalie Smith | Great Britain | 2:11.12 | Q |
| 4 | 2 | 4 | Anastasia Gorbenko | Israel | 2:11.14 | Q |
| 5 | 1 | 3 | Justina Kozan | Poland | 2:11.19 | Q, NR |
| 6 | 2 | 3 | Anita Gastaldi | Italy | 2:11.21 | Q |
| 7 | 1 | 4 | Ellen Walshe | Ireland | 2:11.26 | Q |
| 8 | 1 | 2 | Roos Vanotterdijk | Belgium | 2:12.07 | Q |
| 9 | 1 | 6 | Lea Polonsky | Israel | 2:12.13 | |
| 10 | 2 | 6 | Nikoletta Pavlopoulou | Greece | 2:12.51 | |
| 11 | 2 | 7 | Chiara Della Corte | Italy | 2:13.35 | |
| 12 | 1 | 7 | Ellie McCartney | Ireland | 2:13.85 | |
| 13 | 2 | 8 | Hanna Bergman | Sweden | 2:13.88 | |
| 14 | 1 | 8 | Ieva Maļuka | Latvia | 2:14.09 | |
| 15 | 1 | 1 | Clara Rybak-Andersen | Denmark | 2:14.87 | |
| 16 | 2 | 1 | Linda Roth | Germany | 2:15.02 | |

=== Final ===
| Rank | Lane | Name | Nationality | Time | Notes |
|---|---|---|---|---|---|
| 1st place, gold medalist(s) | 1 | Ellen Walshe | Ireland | 2:09.81 | NR |
| 2nd place, silver medalist(s) | 7 | Anita Gastaldi | Italy | 2:10.07 | |
| 3rd place, bronze medalist(s) | 8 | Roos Vanotterdijk | Belgium | 2:10.10 | |
| 4 | 4 | Abbie Wood | Great Britain | 2:10.17 | |
| 5 | 2 | Justina Kozan | Poland | 2:10.55 | NR |
| 6 | 3 | Amalie Smith | Great Britain | 2:10.56 | |
| 7 | 6 | Anastasia Gorbenko | Israel | 2:10.70 | |
| 8 | 5 | Alba Vázquez | Spain | 2:10.99 | |
