= Swimming at the 2018 Summer Youth Olympics – Girls' 50 metre butterfly =

Girls' 50 metre butterfly at the 2018 Summer Youth Olympics
- Venue: Natatorium
- Dates: 9 October (heats, semifinals); 10 October (final)
- Competitors: 36 from 35 nations
- Winning time: 26.40

Medalists
gold medal	Sara Junevik	Sweden
silver medal	Anastasiya Shkurdai	Belarus
bronze medal	Polina Egorova	Russia
bronze medal	Angelina Köhler	Germany

The girls' 50 metre butterfly event at the 2018 Summer Youth Olympics took place on 9 and 10 October at the Natatorium in Buenos Aires, Argentina.

== Results ==
=== Heats ===
The heats were started on 9 October at 10:22.

Rank	Heat	Lane	Name	Nationality	Time	Notes
1	4	4	Anastasiya Shkurdai	Belarus	26.56	Q
2	3	4	Lin Xintong	China	26.84	Q
3	5	5	Mayuka Yamamoto	Japan	26.84	Q
4	5	4	Sara Junevik	Sweden	26.91	Q
5	5	3	Angelina Köhler	Germany	26.96	Q
6	3	2	Anicka Delgado	Ecuador	27.28	Q
7	4	3	Miriam Guevara	Mexico	27.42	Q
8	5	6	Polina Egorova	Russia	27.43	Q
9	5	1	Kyla Leibel	Canada	27.45	Q
10	2	4	Julieta Lema	Argentina	27.55	Q
11	4	1	Beatriz Padrón	Costa Rica	27.56	Q
12	2	6	Diana Nazarova	Kazakhstan	27.64	Q
13	3	6	Chen Yu-rong	Chinese Taipei	27.66	Q
14	4	6	Tamara Potocká	Slovakia	27.69	Q
15	4	5	Aleyna Özkan	Turkey	27.76	Q
16	2	3	Ieva Maļuka	Latvia	27.85	QSO
16	3	1	Michaela Ryan	Australia	27.85	QSO
16	4	2	Alexandra Schegoleva	Cyprus	27.85	QSO
19	5	2	Lismar Lyon	Venezuela	27.90	
20	5	7	Kornelia Fiedkiewicz	Poland	27.98	
21	3	8	Natalie Kan	Hong Kong	28.01	
22	4	8	Nea-Amanda Heinola	Finland	28.04	
23	1	7	Yuliia Stadnyk	Ukraine	28.15	
24	4	7	Valentina Becerra	Colombia	28.21	
25	3	5	Karolina Jurczyk	Poland	28.25	
26	3	7	Kristýna Štemberová	Czech Republic	28.33	
27	2	5	Victoria Russell	Bahamas	28.40	
28	5	8	Elinah Phillip	British Virgin Islands	28.65	
29	1	4	Dune Coetzee	South Africa	28.70	
30	2	1	Mariel Mencía	Dominican Republic	28.80	
31	2	7	Madelyn Moore	Bermuda	28.96	
32	2	8	Inés Marín	Chile	28.99	
33	1	5	Theresa Hefel	Liechtenstein	29.52	
34	1	2	Ruvarashe Gondo	Botswana	32.16	
35	1	3	Margie Winter	Federated States of Micronesia	32.40	
36	1	6	Anastasiya Tyurina	Tajikistan	33.37	
	2	2	Leoni Richter	Switzerland	DNS	
	3	3	Julia Mrozinski	Germany	DNS	

=== Swim-off ===
The swim-off was held on 9 October at 11:31.

Rank	Lane	Name	Nationality	Time	Notes
1	5	Michaela Ryan	Australia	27.88	Q
2	4	Ieva Maļuka	Latvia	27.93	
3	3	Alexandra Schegoleva	Cyprus	27.94	

=== Semifinals ===
The semifinals were started on 9 October at 18:13.

Rank	Heat	Lane	Name	Nationality	Time	Notes
1	2	3	Angelina Köhler	Germany	26.65	Q
1	2	4	Anastasiya Shkurdai	Belarus	26.65	Q
3	1	5	Sara Junevik	Sweden	26.75	Q
4	1	4	Lin Xintong	China	26.83	Q
5	1	3	Anicka Delgado	Ecuador	26.92	Q
6	1	1	Tamara Potocká	Slovakia	26.95	Q
7	1	6	Polina Egorova	Russia	26.98	Q
8	2	5	Mayuka Yamamoto	Japan	27.12	Q
9	1	2	Julieta Lema	Argentina	27.16	
10	2	1	Chen Yu-rong	Chinese Taipei	27.17	
11	2	2	Kyla Leibel	Canada	27.30	
12	2	6	Miriam Guevara	Mexico	27.70	
13	1	7	Diana Nazarova	Kazakhstan	27.71	
14	2	8	Aleyna Özkan	Turkey	27.77	
15	1	8	Michaela Ryan	Australia	28.06	
16	2	7	Beatriz Padrón	Costa Rica	28.18	

=== Final ===
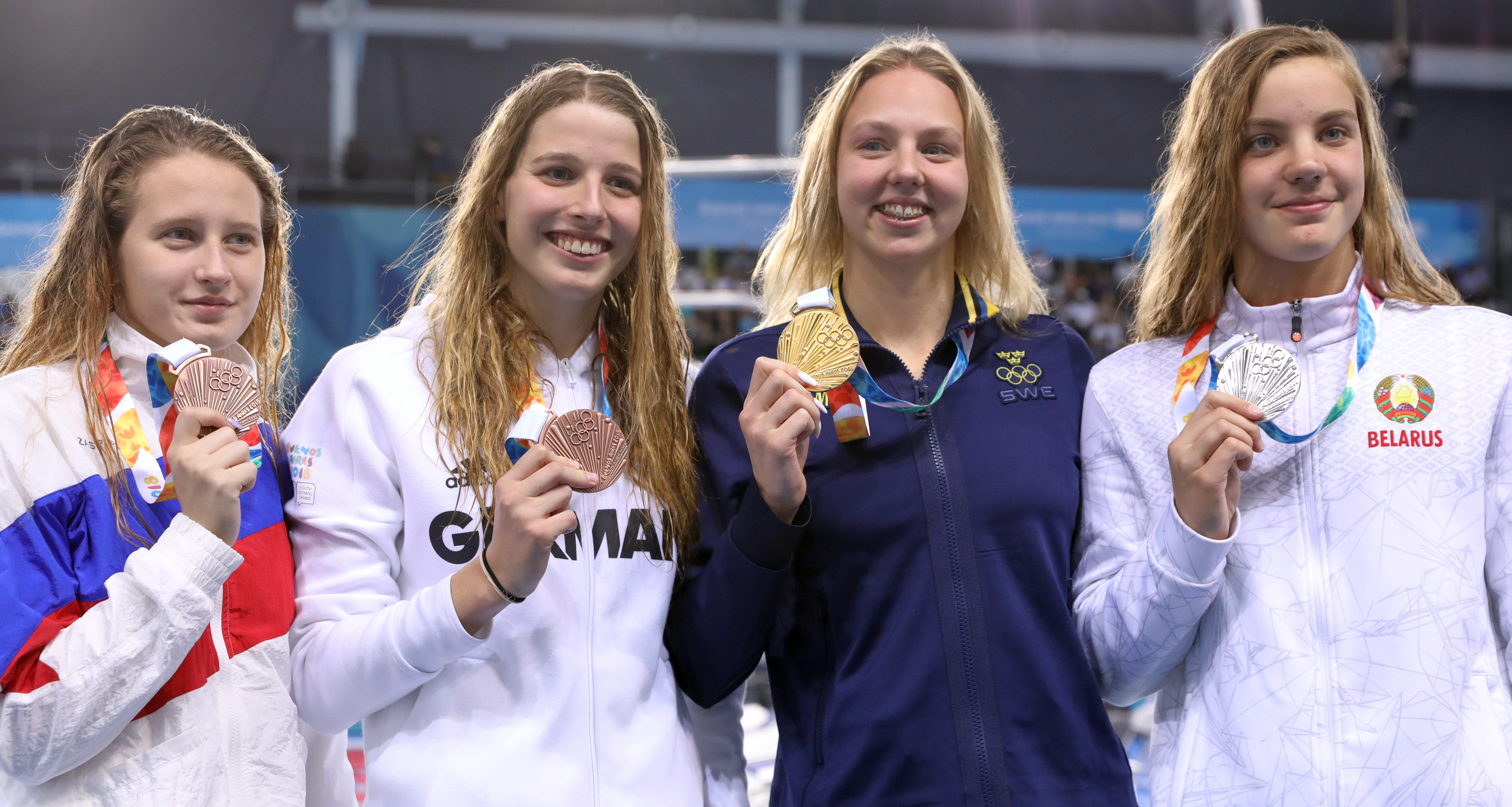
The medalists

The final was held on 10 October at 18:29.

Rank	Lane	Name	Nationality	Time	Notes
1st place, gold medalist(s)	3	Sara Junevik	Sweden	26.40	
2nd place, silver medalist(s)	5	Anastasiya Shkurdai	Belarus	26.62	
3rd place, bronze medalist(s)	1	Polina Egorova	Russia	26.68	
3rd place, bronze medalist(s)	4	Angelina Köhler	Germany	26.68	
5	2	Anicka Delgado	Ecuador	26.80	
6	6	Lin Xintong	China	27.10	
7	8	Mayuka Yamamoto	Japan	27.17	
8	7	Tamara Potocká	Slovakia	27.48	
