= Nika Sharafutdinova =

Ukrainian swimmer (born 2005)

Personal information
- Native name: Ніка Дмитрівна Шарафутдінова
- Nationality: Ukrainian
- Born: 14 June 2005 (age 21) Kryvyi Rih, Ukraine

Sport
- Sport: Swimming
- Strokes: Backstroke
- Club: Osvita
Medal record
European Junior Championships
| Bronze medal – third place | 2022 Otopeni | Mixed 4×100 m medley relay |

Nika Sharafutdinova (Ukrainian: Ніка Дмитрівна Шарафутдінова; born 14 June 2005) is a Ukrainian swimmer. She represented Ukraine at the 2024 Summer Olympics.

== Career ==
Sharafutdinova competed at the 2022 and 2024 European Aquatics Championships. In 2022, she finished 31st in 50 m backstroke and 30th in 100 m backstroke. In 2024, she reached finals in 100 m backstroke where she finished 4th, 0.33 sec behind eventual bronze medallist Roos Vanotterdijk from Belgium, in 50 m backstroke where she finished 7th as well as in 200 m backstroke where she finished 8th.

At the 2024 Summer Olympics, where she was the only Ukrainian female swimmer, Sharafutdinova finished 22nd in 100 m backstroke.
