= Danielle Hill (swimmer) =

Swimmer (born 1999)

Personal information
- Born: 27 September 1999 (age 26) Belfast, Northern Ireland
- Home town: Newtownabbey, County Antrim

Sport
- Sport: Swimming
- Strokes: Backstroke, Freestyle
- Club: Larne
Medal record
Women's swimming
Representing Ireland
European Championships (LC)
Gold medal – first place	2024 Belgrade	50 m backstroke
Silver medal – second place	2024 Belgrade	100 m backstroke

Danielle Hill (born 27 September 1999) is a swimmer from Northern Ireland. She is the 2024 European champion in the 50 metre backstroke. She represented Ireland at the 2020 and 2024 Summer Olympics. She has broken multiple Irish national records.

== Career ==
On 24 June 2021, Hill set a new Irish national record with a time of 1:00.18 in the 100 metre backstroke, simultaneously posting an Olympic qualifying time for the delayed 2020 Summer Olympics. There, she finished 25th in the 100 metre backstroke heats with a time of 1:00.86. Additionally, she competed in the 50 metre freestyle and finished 33rd in the heats.

At the 2022 Irish Championships, Hill broke her own national record in the 100 metre freestyle with a time of 54.87 to win the gold medal. She also won the 50 metre backstroke, 50 metre freestyle, 50 metre butterfly, 100 metre backstroke, and 200 metre backstroke. She represented Northern Ireland at the 2022 Commonwealth Games and finished seventh in both the 50 metre freestyle and the 50 metre backstroke.

Hill became the first Irish swimmer to swim the 100 metre backstroke in under a minute at the 2024 Irish Championships. Additionally, she cleared the qualifying time for the 2024 Summer Olympics. She then won the gold medal in the 50 metre backstroke at the 2024 European Championships, becoming Ireland’s first European long course champion since 1997. She also won a silver medal in the 100 metre backstroke behind Poland's Adela Piskorska.

Hill represented Ireland at the 2024 Summer Olympics. In the 50 metre freestyle, she finished 21st in the heats. She qualified for the semifinals in the 100 metre backstroke and finished 16th. She also competed on the 4 × 100 metre medley relay and 4 × 100 metre freestyle relay teams that finished 11th and 16th, respectively.

Hill won the 50 metre freestyle and 50 metre backstroke at the 2025 Irish Championships and earned qualifying times for the 2025 World Championships.

== Major results ==
Olympic Results
Year	50m Free	100m Back	4x100m Medley Relay	4x100m Free Relay
2020	33rd	25th	—	—
2024	21st	16th	11th	16th

World Championship Results
Year	50m Free	50m Back	50m Fly	100m Back	100m Free	4x100m Free Relay	4x100m Medley Relay
2021 (25m)	22nd	14th	—	25th	31st	—	—
2023	30th	10th	30th	27th	—	15th	13th
2024 (25m)	18th	11th	—	19th	26th	—	—
2025		12th	—	18th	37th	—	—

European Championship Results
Year	50m Back	100m Back	50m Free	100m Free	4x100m Medley Relay	4x100m Free Relay	Mixed 4x100m Medley Relay
2020	—	—	—	—	11th	12th	—
2022	14th	21st	22nd	22nd	—	—	11th
2024	1st place, gold medalist(s)	2nd place, silver medalist(s)	—	—	—	—	—
2026			—	—	—	—	—

Commonwealth Games Results

Year	50m Back	100m Back	50m Free	100m Free	50m Fly	4x100m Medley Relay
2022	7th	9th	7th	DNS	9th	6th
2026	4th	9th	DNS	—	—	6th
