= Panagiotis Simandirakis =

Greek politician and economist (born 1982)

- Παναγιώτης Σημανδηράκης
- Born: 20 November 1982 (age 43); Kera, Greece
- Citizenship: Greece
- Education: University of Athens (MA)
- Occupations: Politician, Economist
- Title: Mayor of Chania

Panagiotis Simandirakis (Greek: Παναγιώτης Σημανδηράκης, born 20 November 1982) is a Greek politician and economist currently serving as the mayor of Chania.

== Biography ==
Simandirakis was born in Kera, Kissamos in 1982. He graduated from the department of Economics of University of Athens with a master's degree with a specialization in European Integration. Before entering politics, he worked as an economic consultant at the Athenian Development Agency. He also co-owns "Cretan Delicacies Simandiraki".

== Political Career ==
Simandirakis first entered politics in 2010 when he was elected as Regional Councilor of Crete with the Crete First Power political party. He was re-elected into the regional council in 2014, and he also became Deputy Regional Minister of Education, Lifelong Learning and Employment until 2017. That same year, he started serving as Regional Councillor responsible for Education & Lifelong Learning. In 2019, he ran in the 2019 municipal elections and was elected as mayor of Chania with 57.03% of the votes.

In 2023, he was re-elected as mayor with 65.79% of the votes. In 2024, he signed the concession of the former Italian Barracks in Chania, which is planned to be the new City Hall.
