= Roos Vanotterdijk =

Belgian swimmer (born 2005)

Personal information
- National team: Belgium
- Born: 7 January 2005 (age 21) Heusden-Zolder, Belgium

Sport
- Sport: Swimming
- Strokes: backstroke, butterfly, freestyle, breaststroke, individual medley
- Club: De Meerkoet Bree
Medal record
Women's swimming
Representing Belgium
Event	1st	2nd	3rd
World Championships (LC)	0	1	1
European Championships (LC)	2	2	2
European Championships (SC)	0	2	0
European U-23 Championships	3	2	0
European Junior Championships	1	2	3
European Youth Olympic Festival	0	1	0
Total	6	10	6
World Championships (LC)
Silver medal – second place	2025 Singapore	100 m butterfly
Bronze medal – third place	2025 Singapore	50 m butterfly
European Championships (LC)
Gold medal – first place	2024 Belgrade	100 m butterfly
Gold medal – first place	2026 Paris	100 m butterfly
Silver medal – second place	2024 Belgrade	50 m butterfly
Silver medal – second place	2026 Paris	50 m butterfly
Bronze medal – third place	2024 Belgrade	100 m backstroke
Bronze medal – third place	2026 Paris	200 m medley
European Championships (SC)
Silver medal – second place	2025 Lublin	50 m butterfly
Silver medal – second place	2025 Lublin	100 m medley
European U23 Championships
Gold medal – first place	2025 Samorin	50 m butterfly
Gold medal – first place	2025 Samorin	100 m butterfly
Gold medal – first place	2025 Samorin	50 m backstroke
Silver medal – second place	2025 Samorin	50 m freestyle
Silver medal – second place	2025 Samorin	100 m backstroke
European Junior Championships
Gold medal – first place	2022 Otopeni	100 m butterfly
Silver medal – second place	2022 Otopeni	100 m backstroke
Silver medal – second place	2022 Otopeni	50 m butterfly
Bronze medal – third place	2021 Rome	50 m butterfly
Bronze medal – third place	2022 Otopeni	100 m freestyle
Bronze medal – third place	2022 Otopeni	50 m backstroke
European Youth Olympic Festival
Silver medal – second place	2019 Baku	100 m butterfly

Roos Vanotterdijk (born 7 January 2005) is a Belgian competitive swimmer. She is the Belgian record holder in the long course 100 metre freestyle, 50 metre backstroke, 100 metre backstroke, 100 metre butterfly and 200 metre medley, as well as the short course 50 and 100 metres backstroke, 50 and 100 metres butterfly, 100 and 200 metres individual medley and 200 metres breaststroke. She won several medals during the European Championships and the World Championships, especially in butterfly. She is already regarded as the greatest Belgian female swimmer of all time.

== Background ==
Vanotterdijk competes for and trains with De Meerkoet Bree (DMB) swim club, based in and serving the residents of the municipality of Bree, Belgium.

== Career ==
=== 2019–2021 ===
At the 2019 European Youth Summer Olympic Festival, held in Baku, Azerbaijan, Vanotterdijk won the fifth medal for Belgium at the Festival in any sport, achieving a time of 59.33 seconds in the final of the 100 metre butterfly to win the silver medal in the event. In April 2021, at the 2020 European Aquatics Championships held at Danube Arena in Budapest, Hungary, she placed 49th in the 100 metre butterfly and 34th in the 50 metre butterfly. Two months later, at the 2021 European Junior Swimming Championships held at Stadio Olimpico del Nuoto in July in Rome, Italy, she won the bronze medal in the 50 metre butterfly with a time of 26.55 seconds, finishing 0.41 seconds behind gold medalist Daria Klepikova of Russia.

=== 2022 ===
==== 2022 European Junior Championships ====
2022 European Junior Championships
Gold medal – first place	100 m butterfly	57.85 (NR)
Silver medal – second place	100 m backstroke	1:00:90 (NR)
Silver medal – second place	50 m butterfly	26.63
Bronze medal – third place	50 m backstroke	28.62
Bronze medal – third place	100 m freestyle	55.34

Vanotterdijk won five medals at the 2022 European Junior Swimming Championships, held in Otopeni, Romania in July, including one gold medal, two silver medals, and two bronze medals. Her first medal was a bronze medal in the 50 metre backstroke, where she finished third with a time of 28.62 seconds after setting a new Belgian record in the semifinals with a time of 28.50 seconds. In the 100 metre butterfly, she won the gold medal and European junior title with a Belgian record time of 57.85 seconds, swimming 0.06 seconds faster than the previous mark of 57.91 seconds set by Kimberly Buys. She next won the bronze medal in the 100 metre freestyle with a personal best time of 55.34 seconds to finish within seven-tenths of a second of gold medalist Nikolett Pádár of Hungary. For the 100 metre backstroke, she won the silver medal with a Belgian record time of 1:00.90, finishing just 0.02 seconds behind the gold medalist Dóra Molnár of Hungary. Later in the same finals session as the 100 metre backstroke, she won a second silver medal, this time in the 50 metre butterfly with a time of 26.63 seconds, finishing 0.13 seconds ahead of bronze medalist Jana Pavalić of Croatia.

==== 2022 European Aquatics Championships ====
On 2 August, when she was 17 years, 207 days of age, Vanotterdijk was announced as one of twelve swimmers on the official Belgium roster for the 2022 European Aquatics Championships, held in Rome, Italy, starting nine days later. The first day of competition, she ranked nineteenth in the 100 metre freestyle with a time of 55.95 seconds and achieved first-alternate status for the semifinals. For the semifinals, her alternate status was called upon, after Nikolett Pádár of Hungary withdrew from the event, and she placed thirteenth with a time of 55.68 seconds. The following day, she finished in a time of 26.76 seconds in the preliminaries of the 50 metre butterfly and qualified for the semifinals ranking sixteenth. She placed fourteenth in the semifinals with a time of 26.85 seconds. The third day, she placed 28th in the 50 metre backstroke with a time of 29.27 seconds.

The fourth day, Vanotterdijk swam a 59.06 in the prelims heats of the 100 metre butterfly, qualifying for the semifinals ranking eleventh. She brought her time down to a 58.42 in the semifinals, ranked sixth across both semifinal heats, and qualified for the final. The following morning, she qualified for the semifinals of the 100 metre backstroke with a 1:01.39 and overall rank of thirteenth in the preliminaries. Later in the day, in the final of the 100 metre butterfly, she placed eighth with a time of 58.74 seconds. Approximately 20 minutes later, she was one of three swimmers born after 2004 to compete in the semifinals of the 100 metre backstroke, where she placed fourteenth with a time of 1:01.61.

==== 2022 Swimming World Cup ====
Leading up to the 2022 FINA Swimming World Cup, Vanotterdijk set a Belgian record in the short course 50 metre backstroke on 15 October with a time of 27.27 seconds at the International Swim Festival in Aachen, Germany. At the 2022 Swimming World Cup stop in Berlin, Germany, with competition beginning 21 October, Vanotterdijk ranked third in the morning preliminaries of the 100 metre individual medley with a Belgian record and personal best time of 59.54 seconds and qualified for the evening final. Earlier in the morning, she dropped 1.03 seconds from her personal best time in the 50 metre freestyle to tie Maaike de Waard of the Netherlands for nineteenth place with a time of 24.89 seconds. In the evening final of the 100 metre individual medley, she lowered her Belgian record to a 59.34 and placed seventh, finishing 0.77 seconds behind bronze medalist Anastasia Gorbenko of Israel. The second day of competition, she placed twelfth in the 100 metre backstroke with a personal best time of 58.56 seconds. On the third and final morning, she ranked seventh in the preliminary heats of the 100 metre butterfly, qualifying for the evening final with a personal best time of 58.03 seconds. Competing in the evening final as the only junior swimmer, born after 2004, she swam a personal best time of 57.90 seconds and placed sixth.

Following the World Cup, in December at the long course 2022 Rotterdam Qualification meet in Rotterdam, Netherlands, Vanotterdijk achieved a personal best time and Belgian record in the 50 metre backstroke with a 28.32. She also achieved a personal best in the 100 metre freestyle with a time of 55.19 seconds.

=== 2023 ===
==== 2023 Flemish Championships ====
At the 2023 Flemish Open Swimming Championships, conducted in long course metres and held in February in Antwerp, Belgium, Vanotterdijk set six new Belgian records in individual events over a period of two days. On 10 February, she set a 54.72 in the preliminaries of the 100 metre freestyle and a 54.51 in the final of the 100 metre freestyle. On 11 February, she set a 1:00.08 in the preliminaries of the 100 metre backstroke, a 25.29 in the preliminaries of the 50 metre freestyle, a 59.62 in the final of the 100 metre backstroke (becoming the first Belgian woman faster than 1:00:00 in the event), and a 25.17 in the final of the 50 metre freestyle. On 12 February, she brought her total number of Belgian records in individual events for the competition to nine, setting new national marks of 28.06 seconds in the preliminaries of the 50 metre backstroke, 57.82 seconds in the preliminaries of the 100 metre butterfly, and 27.97 seconds in the final of the 50 metre backstroke. The following month, she became age-eligible to compete at the 2023 World Junior Swimming Championships and through the end of the 2023 year for world junior records when World Aquatics raised its age cut-off to 18 years of age for female swimmers from its previous cut-off of 17 years of age.

==== 2023 Belgian Championships ====
For the 2023 Belgian Open Championships in April, Vanotterdijk entered to compete in seven individual events. Day one, she achieved a personal best time in the 200 metre freestyle with a 1:59.31 in the preliminaries. In the evening, she won the silver medal with a 1:59.62. The following day, she achieved a personal best time of 2:14.24 in the preliminaries of the 200 metre individual medley. For the evening session, she won the national title each in the 50 metre freestyle (25.31 seconds) and the 100 metre backstroke (59.87 seconds). The third and final day, she won three more national titles, first in the 100 metre freestyle (54.56 seconds), second approximately 35 minutes later in the 50 metre backstroke (28.16 seconds), and third approximately 7 minutes after that in the 50 metre butterfly (26.60 seconds).

The aforementioned times Vanotterdijk achieved in the 50 metre backstroke, 100 metre backstroke, 50 metre butterfly, and 100 metre butterfly from the 2023 Flemish Championships and 2023 Belgian Championships were 2023 World Aquatics Championships qualifying times, except for the 28.16 in the 50 metre backstroke and the 26.60 in the 50 metre butterfly. Of those times, her 100-metre backstroke time (59.87 seconds) from the 2023 Belgian Championships was faster than the 2024 Olympic Games qualifying time cut-off and in the 2024 Summer Olympics qualification period, which started 1 March 2023.

=== 2024 ===
==== 2024 European Championships ====
At the 2024 European Aquatics Championships in Belgrade, Serbia, Vanotterdijk claimed the gold medal in the 100 metre butterfly lowering in the final her 2023 national record from 57.82 to 57.47. In doing so, she qualified for the 2024 Summer Olympics in a second discipline and became the first Belgian swimmer to win a long course European Championship title since Frédérik Deburghgraeve and Brigitte Becue did it in 1995. She also won a silver medal in the 50 metre butterfly and a bronze medal in the 100 metre backstroke.

==== 2024 Summer Olympics ====
Vanotterdijk participated in her first Olympics in two disciplines: the 100 metre backstroke and the 100 metre butterfly, finishing in both disciplines as 10th. In the semi-final of the latter discipline, she bested her national record posting a time of 57.25s.

==== 2024 Belgian Short-Course Championships ====
Leading up the Belgian Short-Course Championships, held from November 9 to November 11, Vanotterdijk set national records in the 50 metre freestyle, the 50 and 100 metre backstroke (twice) at the Drachten (The Netherlands) Qualification Meeting for the 2024 World Aquatics Swimming Championships (25 m). One week later, she broke the national records in the 100 metre freestyle and medley at the International Swimming Festival in Aachen, Germany. At the Belgian Short-Course Championships, Vanotterdijk set national records in the heats of the 100 metre freestyle, backstroke and medley and broke those records again in the finals.

=== 2025 ===
==== 2025 European U-23 Championships ====
At the 2025 European U-23 Swimming Championships in Samorin, Slovakia, on the first day of competition, she won golds in both the 100 m butterfly and 50 m backstroke. On the second day of competition she added two silver medals to her tally finishing runner-up in the 50 m freestyle and 100 m backstroke. On the third and last day of the competition she added a third gold medal-winning the 50 m butterfly setting a new Belgian record.

==== 2025 World Aquatics Championships ====
Having twice broken her national record in the heats and semi-final of the 100 m butterfly, she finished second in the final, beaten only by the world record holder Gretchen Walsh, setting a new national record for a third time in under two days, winning her nation's first swimming medal at the World Aquatics Championships since Fred Deburghgraeve won the 100m breaststroke in Perth 1998, moving herself up to eighth all-time and the ninth woman to break 56 seconds with a time of 55.84 seconds. She then followed this up with a bronze medal in the 50 m butterfly becoming the first Belgian swimmer to win two medals at the same swimming World Championships.

==== 2025 World Aquatics Swimming World Cup ====
Starting her short-course season at the 2025 World Aquatics Swimming World Cup meet in Carmel, United States, Vanotterdijk took the bronze in the 100 metres medley setting national records in both the heats and the final. She followed that up with a bronze in the 50 metres butterfly and a third bronze plus national record in the 100 metres butterfly. A week later, on the first day of competition at the 2025 World Aquatics Swimming World Cup meet in Westmont, United States, she anew set national records in the 100 metres medley and the 50 metres backstroke finishing with the bronze medal in the former. On the second day of competition, she won a bronze medal in the 50 metres butterfly equaling Kimberly Buys' national record with a time of 25.41s. On the last day of competition, she added a bronze medal in the 100 metres butterfly to her tally. During the last leg of the 2025 World Aquatics Swimming World Cup meet in Toronto, Canada, she won a bronze medal in the 100 metres medley on the first day of competition, and on the last day of competition added a bronze medal in the 100 metres butterfly and twice broke the national record in the 200 metres medley.

==== 2025 Open Belgian Short-Course Championships ====
Vanotterdijk won four national titles, finishing in first place in the 200 metres freestyle and breaststroke and the 100 and 200 metres medley. In the 200 metres breaststroke final, she broke Fanny Lecluyse's record that had stood for just over 10 years. In the 200 metres freestyle, she posted a personal best but failed taking down Valentine Dumont's national record by 14 hundreds of a second.

==== European Short-course Championships ====
Vanotterdijk and her trainer gave her a heavy program for these championships. First, on the second day of competition, she won a silver in the 50 metres butterfly, breaking and setting new national records in the heats, semi-final and final. On the third day of competition she added a silver in the 100 metres medley setting again a new national record and in the same session later that evening she qualified for two more finals, the 200 metres breaststroke and the 100 metres butterfly. That evening though she developed a sore throat, and after having finished a disappointing fifth resp. eight in the finals of the 100 metres butterfly and the 200 metres breaststroke on the fourth day of competition, she quit the championships suffering from laryngitis.

=== 2026 ===
Vanotterdijk's preparation for the long-course season was hampered by an injury to a bursa in her right shoulder. She reentered competition in May at the Open Belgian Championships.

==== 2026 European Championships ====
In August at the 2026 European Aquatics Championships in Paris, France she was back at her best. After having equalled Sarah Sjöström's Championship record of 55.89s in the 100m butterfly semi-finals, she retained the 100m butterfly title she won two years before in Belgrade. At the same championships, she increased her career medal tally at the European Aquatics Championships to 6, winning for a second time in her career the silver medal in the 50 metre butterfly and taking the bronze medal in her very first appearance at a European Aquatics Championships in the 200 metre individual medley.

==== 2026 World Aquatics Swimming World Cup ====
Starting her short-course season at the 2026 World Aquatics Swimming World Cup meet in Bacu, Azerbaijan, on the first day of competition, Vanotterdijk took the bronze resp. silver in the 50 metres backstroke and 100 metres medley. On day 2, she won the 50 metres butterfly. On the last day of competition, she won the 100 metres butterfly setting a new national record. On day 1 of the second leg of the 2026 World Aquatics Swimming World Cup in Tashkent, Uzbekistan, Vanotterdijk won silver medals in the 50 metres backstroke and 100 metres medley setting a new national record for both. On day 2 of the competition she won the gold and broke the national record in the 50 metres butterfly. On the third and last day of competition in Tashkent she won the gold and broke the national record in the 100 metres butterfly. On the first day of competition of the third and final meet of the 2026 World Aquatics Swimming World Cup in Astana, Kazakhstan, she bettered her one-week old national record winning the gold medal and the series triple crown in the 50 metres butterfly. Her new best time of 24.56s put her into a tie for #8 all-time in the event, cracking the top 10 for the first time after previously sitting in a tie for 21st. On the second day of competition, she won the silver medal in the 100 metres medley and the gold medal and the series triple crown in the 100 metres butterfly where she set a new national record of 54.80s. With that time she became the 9th person in history under 55 seconds in the event and the 7th fastest performer in history. On the last say of competition she won the silver medal in the 200 metres medley setting a new national record of 2:05.07 and clinching third place in the overall 2026 World Aquatics Swimming World Cup points-scorers ranking.

== International championships (50 m) ==
Meet	50 freestyle	100 freestyle	50 backstroke	100 backstroke	50 butterfly	100 butterfly	200 medley	4×100 medley	4×100 mixed medley
Junior level
EJC 2021 (age: 16)		13th (56.17)		5th (1:01.59)	(bronze) (26.55)	4th (58.94)		15th (split 1:01.96, fl leg)	16th (split 59.75, fl leg)
EJC 2022 (age: 17)		(bronze) (55.34)	(bronze) (28.62)	(silver) (1:00.90 NR)	(silver) (26.63)	(gold) (57.85 NR)			
U-23
U-23 2025 (age: 20)	(silver) (28.23)	5th (54.84)	(gold) (28.05)	(silver) (1:00.27)	(gold) (25.63)	(gold) (57.10)			
Senior level
WC 2025 (age: 20)	23rd (25.09)	=11th (53.87)	11th (27.67)	10th (59.63)	(bronze) (25.43)	(silver) (55.84)			
EC 2020 (age: 16)					34th (27.41)	49th (1:02.70)			
EC 2022 (age: 17)		13th (55.68)	28th (29.27)	14th (1:01.61)	14th (26.85)	8th (58.74)			
EC 2024 (age: 19)				(bronze) (1:00.58)	(silver) (26.08)	(gold) (57.47)			
EC 2026 (age: 21)		=9th (53.70)	10 (27.88)		(silver) (25.12)	(gold) (56.08)	(bronze) (2:10.10)		

== Personal life ==
Vanotterdijk studies psychology at the Free University Brussels in Belgium.

== Personal best times ==
=== Long course metres (50 m pool) ===
Event	Time		Meet	Location	Date	Notes	Ref
50 m freestyle	25.17		2023 Flemish Open Championships	Antwerp, Belgium	11 February 2023	NR	
100 m freestyle	53.62		Flanders Swimming Cup	Antwerp, Belgium	9 February 2025	NR	
200 m freestyle	1:59.31	h	2023 Belgian Open Championships	Antwerp, Belgium	21 April 2023		
50 m backstroke	27.67	sf	2025 World Aquatics Championships	Singapore	30 July 2025	NR	
100 m backstroke	59.62		2023 Flemish Open Championships	Antwerp, Belgium	11 February 2023	NR	
50 m butterfly	25.12	f	2026 European Aquatics Championships	Paris, France	12 August 2026	NR	
100 m butterfly	55.84	f	2025 World Aquatics Championships	Singapore	28 July 2025	NR	
200 m individual medley	2:09.73		2025 Championnats de France	Montpellier, France	14 June 2025	NR	

Legend: NR – Belgian record; e – equalled existing record;
Records not set in finals: h – heat; sf – semifinal; r – relay 1st leg; rh – relay heat 1st leg; b – B final; † – en route to final mark; so – swim-off; tt – time trial

=== Short course metres (25 m pool) ===
Event	Time		Meet	Location	Date	Notes	Ref
50 m freestyle	24.02	f	Flanders Open	Mol, Belgium	8 November 2026		
50 m backstroke	26.31	f	World Cup	Tashkent, Uzbekistan	8 October 2026	NR	
50 m butterfly	24.56	f	World Cup	Astana, Kazakhstan	15 October 2026	NR	
100 m freestyle	52.61	f	Open Danish championships	Copenhagen, Denmark	15 December 2024		
100 m backstroke	56.78	f	Belgian short-course championships	Ghent, Belgium	10 November 2024	NR	
100 m butterfly	54.80	f	World Cup	Astana, Kazakhstan	16 October 2026	NR	
100 m individual medley	56.68	f	World Cup	Tashkent, Uzbekistan	8 October 2026	NR	
200 m freestyle	1:53.65	f	Flanders Open	Mol, Belgium	6 November 2026	NR	
200 m breaststroke	2:18.07	f	Open Belgian Championships	Gent, Belgium	7 November 2025	NR	
200 m individual medley	2:05.07	f	World Cup	Astana, Kazakhstan	17 October 2026	NR	

Legend: NR – Belgian record; e – equalled existing record;
Records not set in finals: h – heat; sf – semifinal; r – relay 1st leg; rh – relay heat 1st leg; b – B final; † – en route to final mark; so – swim-off; tt – time trial

== National records ==
=== Long course metres (50 m pool) ===
No.	Event	Time		Meet	Location	Date	Age	Status	Ref
1	50 m backstroke	28.50	sf	2022 European Junior Championships	Otopeni, Romania	5 July 2022	17 years, 179 days	Former	
2	100 m butterfly	57.85		2022 European Junior Championships	Otopeni, Romania	7 July 2022	17 years, 181 days	Former	
3	100 m backstroke	1:00.90		2022 European Junior Championships	Otopeni, Romania	10 July 2022	17 years, 184 days	Former	
4	50 m backstroke (2)	28.32		2022 Rotterdam Qualification Meet	Rotterdam, Netherlands	2 December 2022	17 years, 329 days	Former	
5	100 m freestyle	54.72	h	2023 Flemish Open Championships	Antwerp, Belgium	10 February 2023	18 years, 34 days	Former	
6	100 m freestyle (2)	54.51		2023 Flemish Open Championships	Antwerp, Belgium	10 February 2023	18 years, 34 days	Former	
7	100 m backstroke (2)	1:00.08	h	2023 Flemish Open Championships	Antwerp, Belgium	11 February 2023	18 years, 35 days	Former	
8	50 m freestyle	25.29	h	2023 Flemish Open Championships	Antwerp, Belgium	11 February 2023	18 years, 35 days	Former	
9	100 m backstroke (3)	59.62		2023 Flemish Open Championships	Antwerp, Belgium	11 February 2023	18 years, 35 days	Current	
10	50 m freestyle (2)	25.17		2023 Flemish Open Championships	Antwerp, Belgium	11 February 2023	18 years, 35 days	Former	
11	50 m backstroke (3)	28.06	h	2023 Flemish Open Championships	Antwerp, Belgium	12 February 2023	18 years, 36 days	Former	
12	100 m butterfly (2)	57.82	h	2023 Flemish Open Championships	Antwerp, Belgium	12 February 2023	18 years, 36 days	Former	
13	50 m backstroke (4)	27.97		2023 Flemish Open Championships	Antwerp, Belgium	12 February 2023	18 years, 36 days	Former	
14	100 m butterfly (3)	57.47	f	2024 European Championships	Belgrade, Serbia	21 June 2024	19 years, 166 days	Former	
15	100 m butterfly (4)	57.25	sf	2024 Summer Olympics	Paris, France	27 July 2024	19 years, 202 days	Former	
16	100 m freestyle (3)	53.62		2025 Flanders Swimming Cup	Antwerp, Belgium	9 February 2025	20 years, 33 days	Current	
17	50 m backstroke (5)	27.81		2025 Swim Open Stockholm	Stockholm, Sweden	12 April 2025	20 years, 95 days	Former	
18	100 m butterfly (5)	57.05		2025 Swim Open Stockholm	Stockholm, Sweden	13 April 2025	20 years, 96 days	Former	
19	200 m medley	2:13.22		2025 Swim Open Stockholm	Stockholm, Sweden	14 April 2025	20 years, 97 days	Former	
20	200 m medley	2:09.73		2025 Championnats de France	Montpellier, France	14 June 2025	20 years, 158 days	Current	
21	50 m butterfly	25.63		2025 European U-23 Swimming Championships	Samorin, Slovakia	28 June 2025	20 years, 172 days	Former	
22	100 m butterfly (6)	56.66	h	2025 World Aquatics Championships	Singapore	27 July 2025	20 years, 201 days	Former	
23	100 m butterfly (7)	56.07	sf	2025 World Aquatics Championships	Singapore	27 July 2025	20 years, 201 days	Former	
24	100 m butterfly (7)	55.84	f	2025 World Aquatics Championships	Singapore	28 July 2025	20 years, 202 days	Current	
25	50 m backstroke (6)	27.67	sf	2025 World Aquatics Championships	Singapore	30 July 2025	20 years, 204 days	Current	
26	50 m butterfly (2)	25.32	sf	2025 World Aquatics Championships	Singapore	1 August 2025	20 years, 206 days	Former	
27	50 m butterfly (3)	25.12	f	2026 European Aquatics Championships	Paris, France	12 August 2026	21 years, 217 days	Current	

Legend: sf – semifinal; h – preliminary heat

=== Short course metres (25 m pool) ===
No.	Event	Time		Meet	Location	Date	Age	Status	Ref
1	50 m backstroke	27.27		2022 International Swim Festival	Aachen, Germany	15 October 2022	17 years, 281 days	Former	
2	100 m individual medley	59.54	h	2022 Swimming World Cup	Berlin, Germany	21 October 2022	17 years, 287 days	Former	
3	100 m individual medley (2)	59.34		2022 Swimming World Cup	Berlin, Germany	21 October 2022	17 years, 287 days	Former	
4	50 m backstroke (2)	26.61	h	Drachten Qualification Meet 2024	Drachten, The Netherlands	19 October 2024	19 years, 286 days	Former	
5	50 m freestyle	24.77	f	Drachten Qualification Meet 2024	Drachten, The Netherlands	19 October 2024	19 years, 286 days	Former	
6	100 m backstroke	58.12	h	Drachten Qualification Meet 2024	Drachten, The Netherlands	20 October 2024	19 years, 287 days	Former	
7	100 m backstroke	58.04	f	Drachten Qualification Meet 2024	Drachten, The Netherlands	20 October 2024	19 years, 287 days	Former	
8	100 m medley	59.25		International Swimming Festival	Aachen, Germany	26 October 2024	19 years, 293 days	Former	
9	100 m freestyle	53.15		International Swimming Festival	Aachen, Germany	27 October 2024	19 years, 294 days	Former	
10	100 m backstroke	57.08	h	Belgian Short-Course Championships	Ghent, Belgium	10 November 2024	19 years, 308 days	Former	
11	100 m freestyle	53.12	h	Belgian Short-Course Championships	Ghent, Belgium	10 November 2024	19 years, 308 days	Former	
12	100 m backstroke (2)	56.78	f	Belgian Short-Course Championships	Ghent, Belgium	10 November 2024	19 years, 308 days	Current	
13	100 m freestyle (2)	53.12	h	Belgian Short-Course Championships	Ghent, Belgium	10 November 2024	19 years, 308 days	Former	
14	100 m freestyle (3)	52.78	f	Belgian Short-Course Championships	Ghent, Belgium	10 November 2024	19 years, 308 days	Former	
15	100 m medley	58.80	h	Belgian Short-Course Championships	Ghent, Belgium	11 November 2024	19 years, 309 days	Former	
16	100 m medley (2)	58.24	f	Belgian Short-Course Championships	Ghent, Belgium	11 November 2024	19 years, 309 days	Former	
17	50 m butterfly	25.32	f	Open Danish championships	Copenhagen, Denmark	14 December 2024	19 years, 343 days	Former	
18	100 m medley (3)	57.92	f	Open Danish championships	Copenhagen, Denmark	15 December 2024	19 years, 343 days	Former	
19	100 m freestyle (4)	52.61	f	Open Danish championships	Copenhagen, Denmark	15 December 2024	19 years, 343 days	Former	
20	100 m medley (4)	57.73	h	World Cup	Carmel, United States	10 October 2025	20 years, 276 days	Former	
21	100 m medley (5)	57.44	f	World Cup	Carmel, United States	10 October 2025	20 years, 276 days	Former	
22	100 m butterfly	55.64	f	World Cup	Carmel, United States	12 October 2025	20 years, 278 days	Former	
23	50 m backstroke (3)	26.43	f	World Cup	Westmont, United States	17 October 2025	20 years, 283 days	Former	
24	100 m medley (6)	57.41	f	World Cup	Westmont, United States	17 October 2025	20 years, 283 days	Former	
25	200 m medley	2:08.42	h	World Cup	Toronto, Canada	25 October 2025	20 years, 291 days	Former	
26	200 m medley (2)	2:05.81	f	World Cup	Toronto, Canada	25 October 2025	20 years, 291 days	Former	
27	200 m breaststroke	2:18.07	f	Open Belgian Championships	Gent, Belgium	7 November 2025	20 years, 304 days	Current	
28	50 m butterfly (2)	25.20	h	2025 European Championships	Lublin, Poland	2 December 2025	20 years, 329 days	Former	
28	50 m butterfly (3)	25.06	sf	2025 European Championships	Lublin, Poland	2 December 2025	20 years, 329 days	Former	
29	50 m butterfly (4)	24.84	f	2025 European Championships	Lublin, Poland	3 December 2025	20 years, 330 days	Former	
30	100 m medley (7)	56.80	f	2025 European Championships	Lublin, Poland	4 December 2025	20 years, 331 days	Former	
31	100 m butterfly (2)	55.29	f	World Cup	Baku, Azerbaijan	3 October 2026	21 years, 269 days	Former	
32	50 m backstroke (4)	26.31	f	World Cup	Tashkent, Uzbekistan	8 October 2026	21 years, 274 days	Current	
30	100 m medley (8)	56.68	f	World Cup	Tashkent, Uzbekistan	8 October 2026	21 years, 274 days	Current	
31	50 m butterfly (5)	24.75	f	World Cup	Tashkent, Uzbekistan	9 October 2026	21 years, 275 days	Former	
32	100 m butterfly (3)	55.20	f	World Cup	Tashkent, Uzbekistan	10 October 2026	21 years, 276 days	Former	
33	50 m butterfly (6)	24.56	f	World Cup	Astana, Kazakhstan	15 October 2026	21 years, 281 days	Current	
34	100 m butterfly (4)	54.80	f	World Cup	Astana, Kazakhstan	16 October 2026	21 years, 282 days	Current	
34	200 m medley (3)	2:05.07	f	World Cup	Astana, Kazakhstan	17 October 2026	21 years, 283 days	Current	
35	200 m freestyle	1:53.65	f	Flanders Open	Mol, Belgium	6 November 2026	21 years, 303 days	Current	

Legend: h – preliminary heat
