= Angelina Köhler =

German swimmer (born 2000)

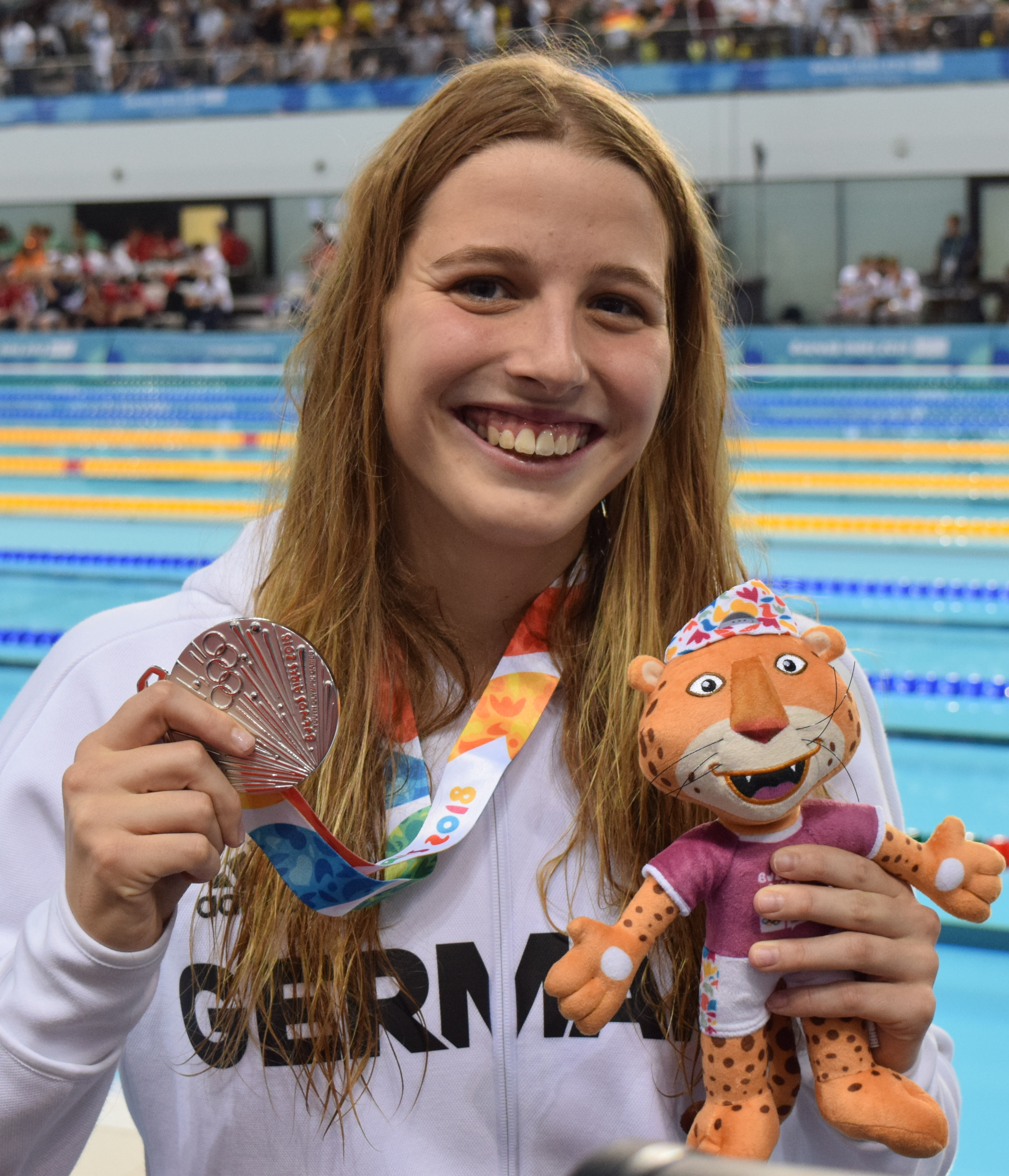
- Angelina Köhler in 2018

Personal information
- Nationality: German
- Born: 12 November 2000 (age 25) Dernbach, Germany
- Height: 1.80 m (5 ft 11 in)
- Weight: 70 kg (154 lb)

Sport
- Sport: Swimming
Medal record
World Championships (LC)
Gold medal – first place	2024 Doha	100 m butterfly
European Championships (LC)
Silver medal – second place	2026 Paris	100 m butterfly
Summer Youth Olympics
Silver medal – second place	2018 Buenos Aires	100 m butterfly
Bronze medal – third place	2018 Buenos Aires	50 m butterfly

Angelina Köhler (born 12 November 2000) is a German swimmer. She competed in the women's 100 metre butterfly at the 2019 World Aquatics Championships held in Gwangju, South Korea. In 2018, she won the silver medal in the 100 m butterfly and the bronze medal in the 50 m butterfly event at the Summer Youth Olympics in Buenos Aires, Argentina.
