= Mariam Sheikhalizadeh =

Iranian-born Azerbaijani swimmer (born 2004)

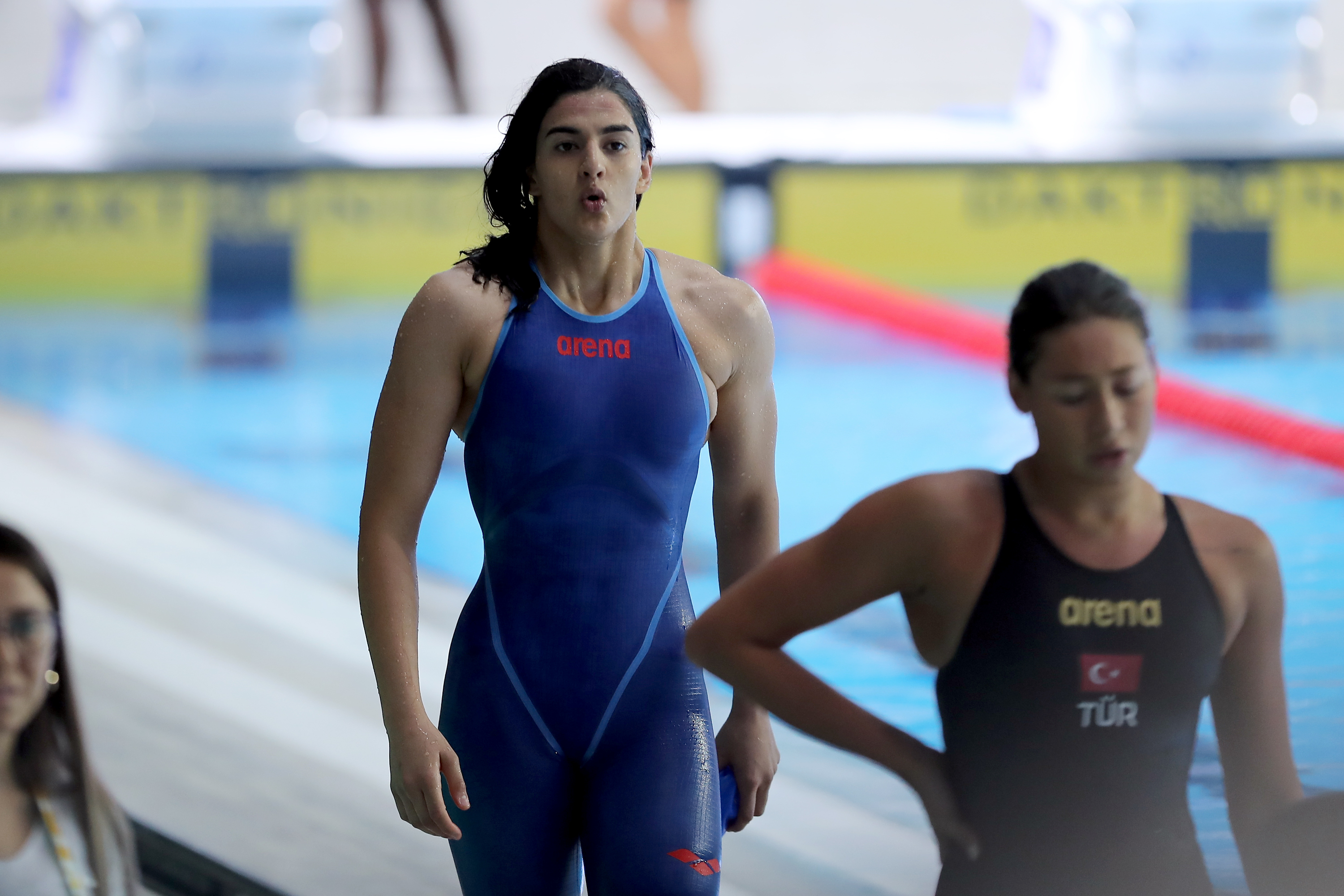
- Sheikhalizadeh at Konya 2021

Personal information
- Full name: Mariam Sheikhalizadehkhanghah; Persian: مریم شیخ‌علیزاده خانقاه
- Born: 18 July 2004 (age 22) Tehran, Iran
- Height: 184 cm (6 ft 0 in)
- Weight: 73 kg (161 lb)

Sport
- Sport: Swimming
Medal record
Women's swimming
Representing Azerbaijan
Event	1st	2nd	3rd
Islamic Solidarity Games	0	1	1
Slovakia Open Swimming Championship	0	0	3
Latvia Open Swimming Championships	0	1	3
Turkcell Turkish Short Course National Team Selection	3	1	1
Total	3	3	8
Islamic Solidarity Games
Silver medal – second place	2021 Konya	50 m Butterfly
Bronze medal – third place	2021 Konya	100 m Butterfly
Slovakia Open Swimming Championship
Bronze medal – third place	Slovakia Championship	50 m Butterfly
Bronze medal – third place	Slovakia Championship	100 m Butterfly
Bronze medal – third place	Slovakia Championship	50 m Freestyle
Latvia Open Swimming Championships
Silver medal – second place	Latvia Championships	50 m Butterfly
Bronze medal – third place	Latvia Championships	100 m Butterfly
Bronze medal – third place	Latvia Championships	100 m Freestyle
Turkcell Turkish Short Course National Team Selection
Gold medal – first place	Turkish National Team Selection	50 m Butterfly
Gold medal – first place	Turkish National Team Selection	100 m Butterfly
Gold medal – first place	Turkish National Team Selection	50 m Freestyle
Silver medal – second place	Turkish National Team Selection	4×50 m Medley
Bronze medal – third place	Turkish National Team Selection	4×100 m Medley

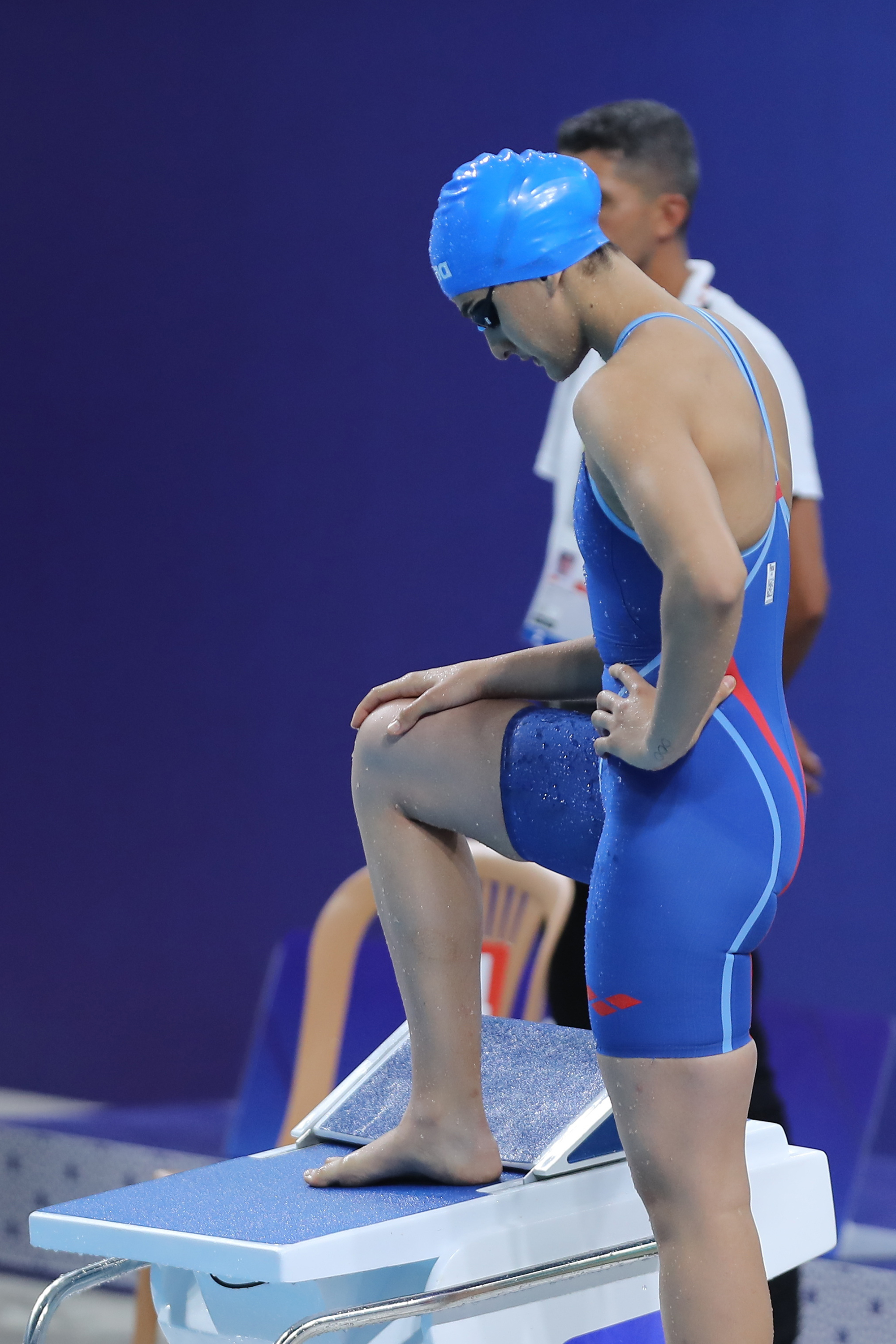
Mariam Sheikhalizadeh at the 2021 Islamic Solidarity Games

Mariam Sheikhalizadeh (Persian: مریم شیخ‌علیزاده; full legal name Mariam Sheikhalizadehkhanghah, Azerbaijani: Məryəm Şeyxəlizadəxangah; born 18 July 2004, in Tehran, Iran) is an Iranian-Azerbaijani competition swimmer, She is a member of National Swimming Team of the Republic of Azerbaijan. She has met the 2020 Olympics qualifying time for the Women's 100 m butterfly, and represented Azerbaijan at the 2020 Summer Olympics.

== Early life ==
Alizadeh was born in 2004 in Tehran, Iran. When she was 11 years old, in the last competitions of the cup of martyrs viceroy of Azerbaijan on Islamic countries, held in the Tabriz, she broke 13 national records in Iran. At 2018, she was invited by the Swimming Federation of the Republic of Azerbaijan and went to Baku to continue her career in the National Swimming Team of the Republic of Azerbaijan. Maryam qualified for Tokyo 2020 on this sport after participating in various swimming competitions and Budapest international swimming competitions. She is known as the first woman to qualify for the Olympics in the history of Iranian women's swimming after 43 years.

== 2021 Islamic Solidarity Games ==
Maryam Sheikh Alizadeh won two medals in the fifth edition of the Solidarity Games of Islamic countries: silver medal in 50m butterfly and bronze medal in 100m butterfly.

== Achievements ==
Alizadeh took several valuable places in women's swimming after the world competitions. She won the third place in the freestyle competitions of the Slovak Republic three times within a year. Then she participated in Latvia freestyle competitions and once took second and once third place. She is now a world ranking female athlete of Swimming Federation (FINA).
