= Lora Komoróczy =

Hungarian swimmer (born 2006)

Personal information
- Full name: Lora Fanni Komoróczy
- Nickname: Lora
- National team: Hungary
- Born: 22 February 2006 (age 20) Budapest, Hungary

Sport
- Sport: Swimming
- Strokes: Backstroke, butterfly
- Club: BVSC-Zugló
- Coach: Imre Takács
Medal record
Women's swimming
Representing Hungary
Event	1st	2nd	3rd
World Junior Championships	1	0	0
European Junior Championships	2	2	0
Total	3	2	0
World Junior Championships
Gold medal – first place	2022 Lima	50 m backstroke
European Junior Championships
Gold medal – first place	2023 Belgrade	50 m backstroke
Gold medal – first place	2023 Belgrade	100 m backstroke
Silver medal – second place	2022 Otopeni	50 m backstroke
Silver medal – second place	2022 Otopeni	4×100 m medley

Lora Fanni Komoróczy (born 22 February 2006) is a Hungarian competitive swimmer who specializes in sprint backstroke and butterfly events. At the 2022 World Junior Championships, she won the gold medal in the 50-metre backstroke and placed eighth in the final of the 50-metre butterfly. At the 2022 World Aquatics Championships, she placed seventeenth in the 50-metre backstroke.

== Background ==
Komoróczy was born 22 February 2006 in Budapest and currently trains with Iron SE swim club under the guidance of coach Imre Takács.

== Career ==
=== 2021–2022 ===
As a 15-year-old at the 2021 Hungarian Short Course Championships in Kaposvár in November, Komoróczy won the gold medal in the 50-metre backstroke, setting a new youth record, the fastest time swum in the event by a female Hungarian swimmer 17 years of age or younger. The following year, at the senior 2022 World Aquatics Championships, with pool swimming competition held in June at Danube Arena in Budapest, she placed seventeenth overall in the 50-metre backstroke with a time of 28.49 seconds.

==== 2022 European Junior Championships ====
At the 2022 European Junior Swimming Championships, held in July Otopeni, Romania, Komoróczy won the silver medal in the 50-metre backstroke with a personal best time of 28.31 seconds, finishing 0.31 seconds ahead of bronze medalist Roos Vanotterdijk of Belgium. For her other events, she won a silver medal as part of the 4×100-metre medley relay, swimming butterfly in both the preliminary heats and the final, placed fourth in the final of the 100-metre backstroke with a personal best time of 1:01.80, placed fourth in the 4×100-metre mixed medley relay, swimming butterfly in the preliminaries and backstroke in the final, placed thirteenth in the semifinals of the 50-metre butterfly with a 27.46, and placed seventeenth in the 100-metre butterfly with a personal best time of 1:01.97.

==== 2022 World Junior Championships ====
2022 World Junior Championships
Gold medal – first place	50 m backstroke	28.51

In the preliminaries of the 100-metre backstroke on day one of the 2022 FINA World Junior Swimming Championships, conducted beginning 30 August in Lima, Peru, Komoróczy placed 20th in the 100-metre backstroke with a time of 1:04.86. The next day, she helped rank third in the preliminaries of the 4×100-metre mixed medley relay, swimming the backstroke leg in 1:03.13, and qualify the relay to the final, where she was substituted out and the finals relay was disqualified for early start by the male swimmer on the butterfly leg of the relay. Two days later, she started off the evening session with a time of 28.48 seconds and overall first-rank in the semifinals of the 50-metre backstroke, qualifying for the final the following day. In her second event of the evening, she placed eighth in the final of the 50-metre butterfly with a time of 27.66 seconds, which was 1.28 seconds behind gold medalist Jana Pavalić of Croatia.

Komoróczy began the fifth day of competition in the morning by not starting the 100-metre butterfly preliminaries. In the evening session, she won the gold medal in the 50-metre backstroke with a time of 28.51 seconds, finishing 0.19 seconds ahead of silver medalist Aimi Nagaoka of Japan and 0.42 seconds ahead of bronze medalist Sara Curtis of Italy. The sixth and final day, she helped achieve a fourth-place finish in the final of the 4×100-metre medley relay in 4:09.33, splitting a 1:01.60 for the butterfly leg of the relay.

==== 2022 Hungarian Short Course Championships ====
For the 2022 Hungarian National Short Course Championships, held in November in Kaposvár when Komoróczy was 16 years old, she won the national title and gold medal in the 50-metre backstroke with a personal best time of 27.09 seconds on day one, which was over eight-tenths of a second faster than the second-place finisher. The second day, she won the bronze medal in the 100-metre backstroke with a personal best time of 59.84 seconds and then placed fourth in the final of the 100-metre individual medley with a personal best time of 1:01.29. The following evening, she won the gold medal and national title in the 50-metre butterfly with a personal best time of 26.56 seconds. Day four of four, she achieved an eighth-place finish in the final of the 100-metre butterfly with a personal best time of 1:00.25.

In December, at the 2023 Hungarian Junior National Short Course Championships in Szeged, Komoróczy won the gold medal in the 100-metre backstroke with a personal best time of 59.69 seconds on day two. Later in the finals session, she achieved another personal best time, this time finishing in 25.74 seconds in the 50-metre freestyle to win the silver medal 0.68 seconds behind gold medalist Nikolett Pádár. She also achieved a pair of gold medals in breaststroke events each with a personal best time, first the 100-metre breaststroke on day one with a 1:08.77, then the 50-metre breaststroke with a 31.88 on day four.

=== 2023 ===
On the first day of the 2023 Hungarian National Championships in Kaposvár, 19 April, Komoróczy won the national title in the 50-metre backstroke with a time of 28.48 seconds. Two days later, she achieved a time of 27.25 seconds in the final of the 50-metre butterfly and won the silver medal.

== International championships (50 m) ==
Meet	50 backstroke	100 backstroke	50 butterfly	100 butterfly	4×100 medley	4×100 mixed medley
Junior level
EJC 2022	2nd place, silver medalist(s)	4th	13th	17th	2nd place, silver medalist(s)	4th
WJC 2022	1st place, gold medalist(s)	20th	8th	DNS	4th	DSQ^{[a]}^{[b]}
Senior level
WC 2022	17th					

^{a} Komoróczy swam only in the preliminary heats.
^{b} Komoróczy was not a member of the finals relay that was disqualified.

== Personal best times ==
=== Long course meters (50 m pool) ===
Event	Time	Meet	Location	Date	Age	Ref
50 m backstroke	28.02	2024 European Swimming Championships	Belgrade, Serbia	20 June 2024	16	
100 m backstroke	1:01.08	2024 European Swimming Championships	Belgrade, Serbia	23 June 2024	16	
50 m breaststroke	32.50	2023 Hungarian Youth National Championships	Kaposvár	5 August 2023	16	
50 m butterfly	26.83	2024 European Swimming Championships	Belgrade, Serbia	18 June 2024	16	
100 m butterfly	58.93	2024 Hungarian National Championships	Budapest, Hungary	12 April 2024	16	

=== Short course metres (25 m pool) ===
Event	Time	Meet	Location	Date	Age	Ref
50 m freestyle	25.74	2022 Hungarian Junior National Short Course Championships	Szeged	8 December 2022	16	
50 m backstroke	27.09	2022 Hungarian National Short Course Championships	Kaposvár	16 November 2022	16	
100 m backstroke	59.69	2022 Hungarian Junior National Short Course Championships	Szeged	8 December 2022	16	
50 m breaststroke	31.88	2022 Hungarian Junior National Short Course Championships	Szeged	10 December 2022	16	
100 m breaststroke	1:08.77	2022 Hungarian Junior National Short Course Championships	Szeged	7 December 2022	16	
50 m butterfly	26.56	2022 Hungarian National Short Course Championships	Kaposvár	18 November 2022	16	
100 m butterfly	1:00.25	2022 Hungarian National Short Course Championships	Kaposvár	19 November 2022	16	
100 m individual medley	1:01.29	2022 Hungarian National Short Course Championships	Kaposvár	17 November 2022	16	
