= Sara Junevik =

Swedish swimmer (born 2000)

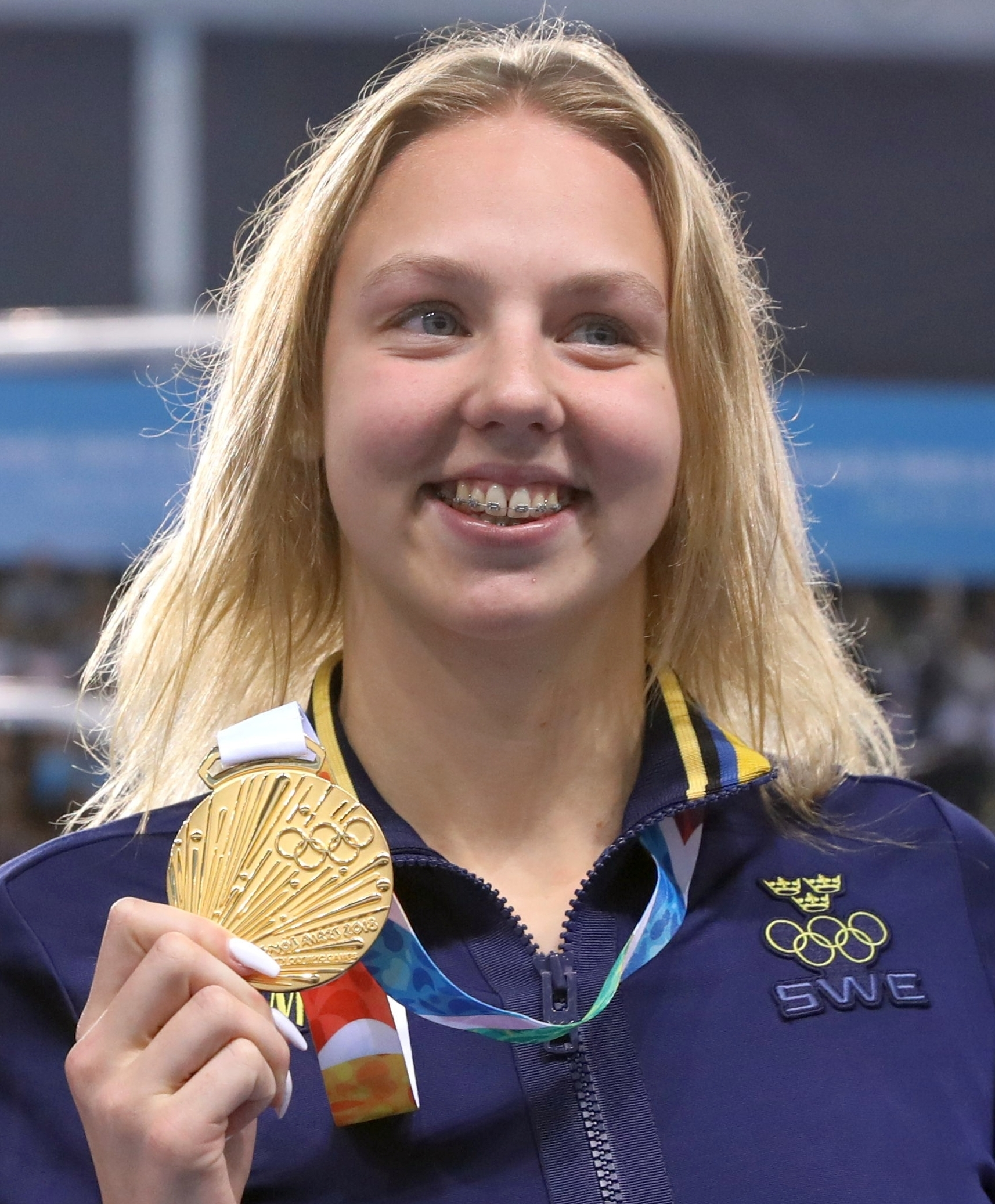
- Junevik in 2018

Personal information
- Full name: Sara Jennifer Junevik
- Nationality: Swedish
- Born: 14 February 2000 (age 26)
- Height: 1.82 m (6 ft 0 in)

Sport
- Sport: Swimming
- Strokes: Butterfly, freestyle
Medal record
Women's swimming
Representing Sweden
Senior level
World Championships (SC)
Silver medal – second place	2021 Abu Dhabi	4×50 m freestyle
Bronze medal – third place	2021 Abu Dhabi	4×100 m freestyle
Bronze medal – third place	2022 Melbourne	4×50 m medley
European Championships (LC)
Gold medal – first place	2024 Belgrade	50 m butterfly
Silver medal – second place	2022 Rome	4×100 m freestyle
Bronze medal – third place	2024 Belgrade	100 m butterfly
Bronze medal – third place	2026 Paris	50 m butterfly
European Championships (SC)
Gold medal – first place	2017 Copenhagen	4×50 m medley
Silver medal – second place	2021 Kazan	4×50 m medley
Silver medal – second place	2025 Lublin	4×50 m medley
Junior level
Summer Youth Olympics
Gold medal – first place	2018 Buenos Aires	50 m butterfly
World Junior Championships
Silver medal – second place	2017 Indianapolis	50 m butterfly
European Junior Championships
Silver medal – second place	2016 Hódmezővásárhely	50 m butterfly
Bronze medal – third place	2017 Netanya	50 m butterfly

Sara Junevik (born 14 February 2000) is a Swedish swimmer. In 2021, she represented Sweden at the 2020 Summer Olympics held in Tokyo, Japan. She also competed at the 2021 FINA World Swimming Championships (25 m).
