= Anna Ntountounaki =

Greek swimmer (born 1995)

Personal information
- Native name: Άννα Ντουντουνάκη
- Born: 9 September 1995 (age 31) Chania, Crete, Greece
- Height: 177 cm (5 ft 10 in)
- Weight: 66 kg (146 lb)

Sport
- Sport: Swimming
- Club: Panathinaikos
Medal record
Representing Greece
European Championships (LC)
Gold medal – first place	2020 Budapest	100 m butterfly
Bronze medal – third place	2024 Belgrade	50 m butterfly
European Championships (SC)
Gold medal – first place	2023 Otopeni	50 m butterfly
Silver medal – second place	2021 Kazan	100 m butterfly
Bronze medal – third place	2019 Glasgow	100 m butterfly
Bronze medal – third place	2021 Kazan	50 m butterfly
Bronze medal – third place	2023 Otopeni	100 m butterfly
Mediterranean Games
Gold medal – first place	2022 Oran	50 m butterfly
Gold medal – first place	2026 Taranto	50 m butterfly
Gold medal – first place	2026 Taranto	100 m butterfly
Silver medal – second place	2022 Oran	50 m backstroke
Silver medal – second place	2022 Oran	100 m butterfly
Silver medal – second place	2026 Taranto	4×100 m mixed medley
Bronze medal – third place	2018 Tarragona	100 m butterfly
Bronze medal – third place	2018 Tarragona	4×100 m medley relay

Anna Ntountounaki (Greek: Άννα Ντουντουνάκη, born 9 September 1995) is a Greek swimmer, competing for Panathinaikos on club level.

== Career ==
She competed in the women's 100 metre butterfly event at the 2016 Summer Olympics. She finished 17th in the heats with a time of 58.27 seconds which was a new national record. She did not qualify for the semifinals. At the 2020 Summer Olympics she finished 9th, achieving a new national record with a time of 57.25 seconds. Also, she won the gold of 2020 European Aquatics Championships sharing this title with Marie Wattel.

== Education ==
Anna began swimming in 2002, at the age of seven. She also studied at the Queen Mary University of London.

== Awards ==
On 24 December 2019, Ntountounaki was awarded by the mayor of Chania, Panagiotis Simandirakis, along with Stelios Michailakis.
