= Marie Wattel =

French swimmer (born 1997)

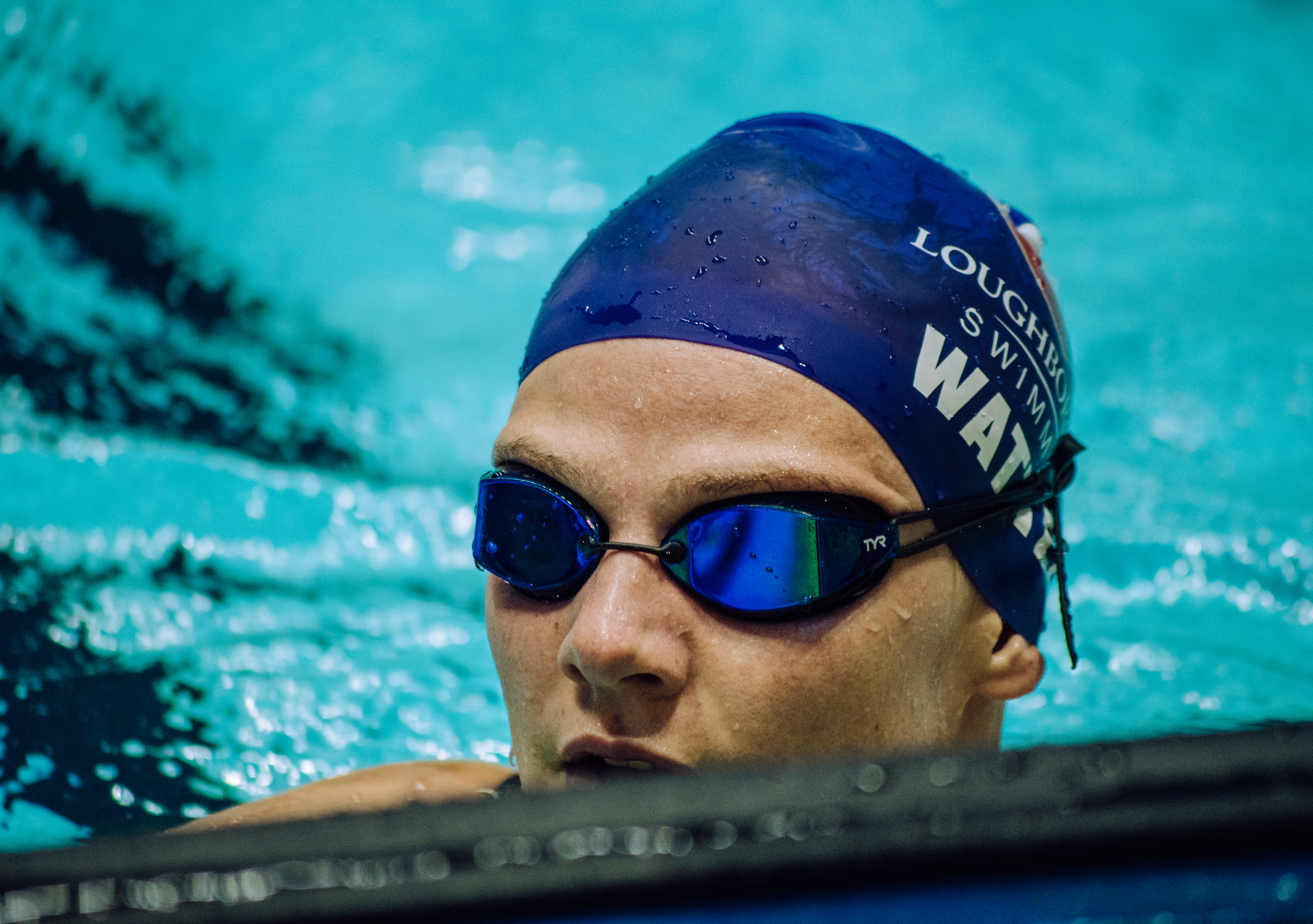
- Marie Wattel in 2020

Personal information
- Nationality: French
- Born: 2 June 1997 (age 29) Lille, France
- Height: 1.80 m (5 ft 11 in)
- Weight: 71 kg (157 lb)

Sport
- Sport: Swimming
- Strokes: Freestyle, butterfly
- Club: Loughborough University
Medal record
Women's swimming
Representing France
World Championships
Silver medal – second place	2022 Budapest	100 m butterfly
Bronze medal – third place	2019 Gwangju	4×100 m mixed freestyle
Bronze medal – third place	2025 Singapore	4x100 m mixed freestyle
European Championships (LC)
Gold medal – first place	2018 Glasgow	4×100 m freestyle
Gold medal – first place	2018 Glasgow	4×100 m mixed freestyle
Gold medal – first place	2020 Budapest	100 m butterfly
Gold medal – first place	2022 Rome	4×100 m mixed freestyle
Gold medal – first place	2026 Paris	4×100 m mixed medley
Silver medal – second place	2020 Budapest	100 m freestyle
Silver medal – second place	2022 Rome	50 m butterfly
Silver medal – second place	2022 Rome	100 m butterfly
Silver medal – second place	2022 Rome	4×100 m medley
Bronze medal – third place	2020 Budapest	4×100 m freestyle
European Championships (SC)
Silver medal – second place	2017 Copenhagen	100 m butterfly
Bronze medal – third place	2017 Copenhagen	4×50 m medley
Mediterranean Games
Gold medal – first place	2018 Tarragona	200 m freestyle
Silver medal – second place	2018 Tarragona	4×100 m freestyle
Silver medal – second place	2018 Tarragona	4×200 m freestyle
Bronze medal – third place	2018 Tarragona	50 m butterfly
European Junior Championships
Bronze medal – third place	2013 Poznań	100 m butterfly

Marie Wattel (born 2 June 1997) is a French swimmer. She competed in the women's 100 metre butterfly event at the 2016 Summer Olympics. She qualified to represent France at the 2020 Summer Olympics. At the 2022 World Aquatics Championships, she won the silver medal in the 100 metre butterfly with a time of 56.14 seconds.
