= Anastasiya Kuliashova =

Belarusian swimmer

Personal information
- Nationality: Belarus
- Born: 30 November 2001 (age 23); Minsk, Belarus

Sport
- Sport: Swimming

Anastasiya Kuliashova (born 30 November 2001) is a Belarusian swimmer. She competed in the 2020 Summer Olympics.
