= Nina Stanisavljević =

Serbian swimmer (born 2004)

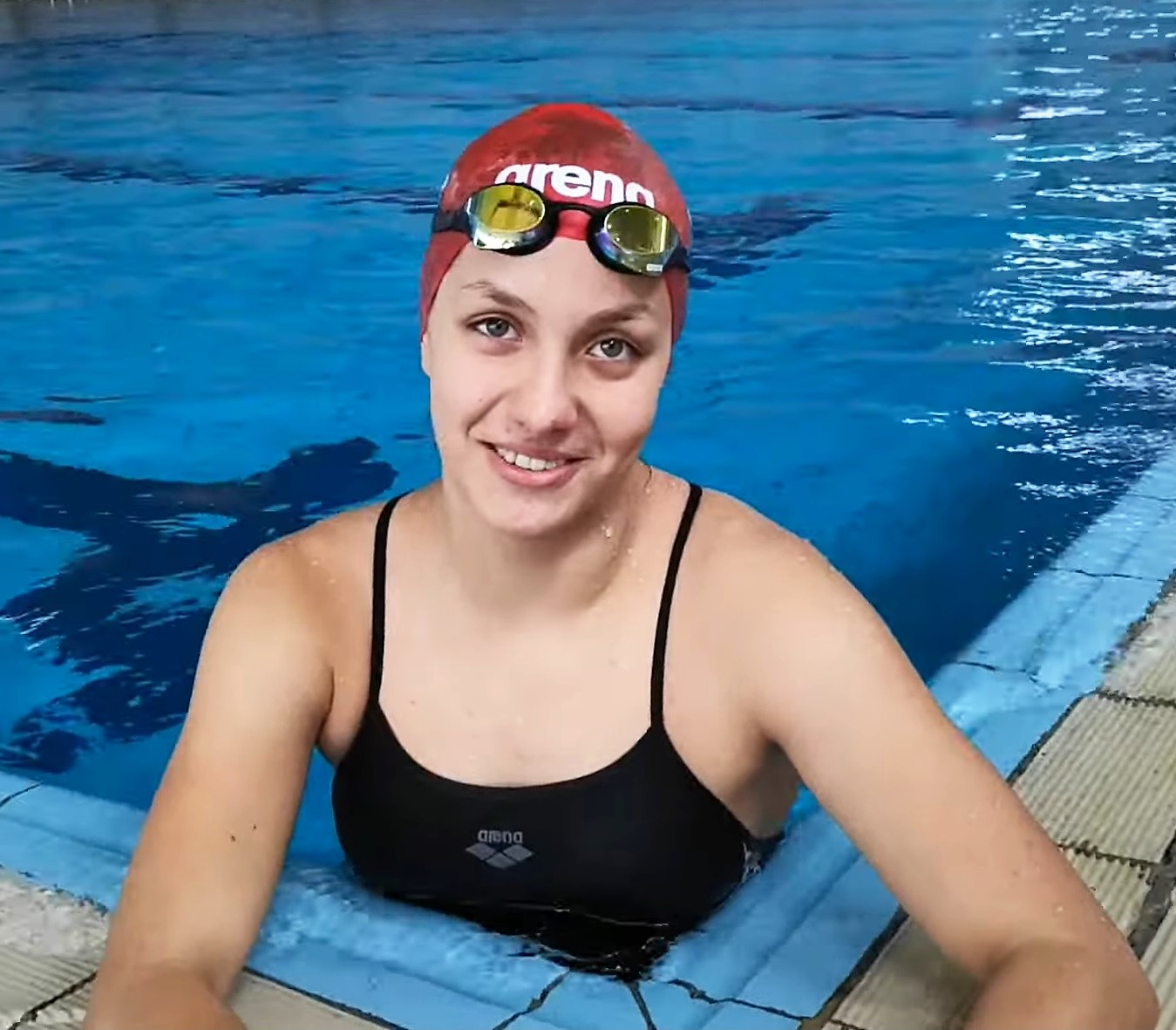
- Stanisavljević in 2019

Personal information
- Nationality: Serbian
- Born: 17 May 2004 (age 22) Leskovac, Serbia
- Height: 1.74 m (5 ft 9 in)
- Weight: 67 kg (148 lb)

Sport
- Sport: Swimming
Medal record
Representing Serbia
Mediterranean Games
| Gold medal – first place | 2022 Oran | 50 m backstroke |
European U-23 Championships
| Bronze medal – third place | 2023 Dublin | Skins race |
European Junior Championships
| Silver medal – second place | 2021 Rome | 50 m backstroke |
European Youth Summer Olympic Festival
| Silver medal – second place | 2019 Baku | 50 m freestyle |

Nina Stanisavljević (born 17 May 2004) is a Serbian swimmer. She competed in the women's 50 metre freestyle event at the 2020 European Aquatics Championships, in Budapest, Hungary.
