= Paulina Peda =

Polish swimmer (born 1998)

Personal information
- Nationality: Poland
- Born: 18 March 1998 (age 28) Chorzów, Poland

Sport
- Sport: Swimming
Medal record
World University Games
Silver medal – second place	2021 Chengdu	50 m backstroke
Silver medal – second place	2021 Chengdu	4×100 m medley

Paulina Peda (born 18 March 1998) is a Polish backstroke and butterfly swimmer. She competed in the 2020 Summer Olympics.
