= Swimming at the 2025 World Aquatics Championships – Women's 200 metre butterfly =

Women's 200 metre butterfly at the 2025 World Aquatics Championships
- Venue: World Aquatics Championships Arena
- Location: Singapore Sports Hub, Kallang
- Dates: 30 July (heats and semifinals); 31 July (final)
- Competitors: 27 from 24 nations
- Winning time: 2:01.99

Medalists
gold medal	Summer McIntosh	Canada
silver medal	Regan Smith	United States
bronze medal	Elizabeth Dekkers	Australia

The women's 200 metre butterfly event at the 2025 World Aquatics Championships was held from 30 to 31 July 2025 at the World Aquatics Championships Arena at the Singapore Sports Hub in Kallang, Singapore.

== Background ==
Summer McIntosh of Canada entered the event as the favorite, aiming for her fourth consecutive major title. She had set a new Canadian, Commonwealth, and Americas record of 2:02.26 at the Canadian Trials, the second-fastest time in history and 0.45 seconds shy of Liu Zige’s 2009 world record of 2:01.81. Given that McIntosh swam her best time each of the previous three summers in the major final, she was predicted to be well-positioned for a potential world record challenge.

Regan Smith of the United States, a consistent medalist since 2021, ranked second this year with a time of 2:05.38 and was the only other swimmer in the field with a personal best under 2:04. Her teammate Caroline Bricker had a breakout year, clocking 2:05.80 to win U.S. Nationals and ranking third globally in 2025. Also under 2:07 this season were Brittany Castelluzzo of Australia (2:06.86) and Keanna Macinnes of Great Britain (2:06.93), both of whom were predicted to contend for bronze. Australia's Elizabeth Dekkers was also predicted to be a bronze medal contender. China's 12-year-old Yu Zidi swam 2:06.83 at Chinese nationals and was predicted to potentially reach the final. Other final hopefuls included Helena Rosendahl Bach of Denmark, Emily Richards of Great Britain, Lillou Ressencourt of France, and Ma Yonghui of China.

== Qualification ==
Each National Federation was permitted to enter a maximum of two qualified athletes in each individual event, but they could do so only if both of them had attained the "A" standard qualification time. For this event, the "A" standard qualification time was 2:09.21 seconds. Federations could enter one athlete into the event if they met the "B" standard qualification time. For this event, the "B" standard qualification time was 2:13.73 seconds. Athletes could also enter the event if they had met an "A" or "B" standard in a different event and their Federation had not entered anyone else. Additional considerations applied to Federations who had few swimmers enter through the standard qualification times. Federations in this category could at least enter two men and two women to the competition, all of whom could enter into up to two events.

Top 10 fastest qualification times (Note: Only including swimmers who were on the start list for this event)
Swimmer	Country	Time	Competition
Summer McIntosh	Canada	2:02.26	2025 Canadian Trials
Regan Smith	United States	2:03.84	2024 Summer Olympics
Elizabeth Dekkers	Australia	2:05.20	2024 Australian Championships
Caroline Bricker	United States	2:05.80	2025 United States Championships
Helena Rosendahl Bach	Denmark	2:06.65	2024 Summer Olympics
Yu Zidi	China	2:06.83	2025 Chinese Championships
Brittany Castelluzzo	Australia	2:06.86	2025 Australian Championships
Keanna Macinnes	Great Britain	2:06.93	2025 AP Race International
Ma Yonghui	China	2:08.04	2025 Chinese Championships
Lana Pudar	Bosnia and Herzegovina	2:08.15	2024 European Championships

== Records ==
Prior to the competition, the existing world and championship records were as follows.

World record	Liu Zige (CHN)	2:01.81	Jinan, China	21 October 2009
Competition record	Jessicah Schipper (AUS)	2:03.41	Rome, Italy	30 July 2009

The following new records were set during this competition.

Date	Event	Name	Nationality	Time	Record
31 July	Final	Summer McIntosh	Canada	2:01.99	CR

== Heats ==
The heats took place on 30 July at 11:21.

Rank	Heat	Lane	Swimmer	Nation	Time	Notes
1	3	4	Summer McIntosh	Canada	2:07.07	Q
2	3	3	Brittany Castelluzzo	Australia	2:07.84	Q
3	2	4	Regan Smith	United States	2:08.17	Q
4	1	4	Elizabeth Dekkers	Australia	2:08.45	Q
5	1	5	Yu Zidi	China	2:08.95	Q
6	1	3	Ma Yonghui	China	2:08.96	Q
7	2	6	Ellen Walshe	Ireland	2:09.15	Q
8	3	5	Caroline Bricker	United States	2:09.23	Q
9	2	3	Keanna Macinnes	Great Britain	2:09.24	Q
10	1	2	Georgia Damasioti	Greece	2:09.34	Q
11	2	5	Helena Rosendahl Bach	Denmark	2:09.36	Q
12	2	2	Yasuki Fujimoto	Japan	2:09.70	Q
13	1	6	Lilou Ressencourt	France	2:09.86	Q
14	3	2	Laura Cabanes	Spain	2:09.89	Q
15	3	6	Emily Richards	Great Britain	2:09.98	Q
16	2	7	Park Su-jin	South Korea	2:10.17	Q
17	2	1	Lea Polonsky	Israel	2:11.65	
18	3	7	Kamonchanok Kwanmuang	Thailand	2:12.13	
19	1	1	Amina Kajtaz Pinjo	Croatia	2:12.60	
20	1	7	Yeung Hoi Ching	Hong Kong	2:13.46	
21	3	1	Quah Jing Wen	Singapore	2:13.50	
22	3	8	Yasmin Silva Contreras	Peru	2:13.72	
23	2	8	Anje van As	Zimbabwe	2:19.43	
24	1	8	Lia Lima	Angola	2:23.77	
25	2	0	Inana Soleman	Syria	2:25.75	
26	3	0	Amaya Bollinger	Guam	2:35.09	
27	1	0	Ony Andrianaivo	Madagascar	2:59.22	

== Semifinals ==
The semifinals took place on 30 July at 20:16.

Rank	Heat	Lane	Swimmer	Nation	Time	Notes
1	1	5	Elizabeth Dekkers	Australia	2:06.13	Q
2	2	4	Summer McIntosh	Canada	2:06.22	Q
3	2	5	Regan Smith	United States	2:06.96	Q
4	2	6	Ellen Walshe	Ireland	2:07.48	Q, NR
5	2	8	Emily Richards	Great Britain	2:07.71	Q
6	1	6	Caroline Bricker	United States	2:07.86	Q
7	2	7	Helena Rosendahl Bach	Denmark	2:07.92	Q
8	2	3	Yu Zidi	China	2:07.95	Q
9	1	4	Brittany Castelluzzo	Australia	2:08.04	
10	1	2	Georgia Damasioti	Greece	2:08.39	NR
11	1	3	Ma Yonghui	China	2:08.59	
12	1	1	Laura Cabanes	Spain	2:10.07	
13	1	7	Yasuki Fujimoto	Japan	2:10.20	
14	1	8	Park Su-jin	South Korea	2:10.26	
15	2	1	Lilou Ressencourt	France	2:10.87	
16	2	2	Keanna Macinnes	Great Britain	2:11.18	

== Final ==
The final took place on 31 July at 14:02.

Rank	Lane	Name	Nationality	Time	Notes
1st place, gold medalist(s)	5	Summer McIntosh	Canada	2:01.99	CR, AM
2nd place, silver medalist(s)	3	Regan Smith	United States	2:04.99	
3rd place, bronze medalist(s)	4	Elizabeth Dekkers	Australia	2:06.12	
4	8	Yu Zidi	China	2:06.43	
5	1	Helena Rosendahl Bach	Denmark	2:07.47	
6	7	Caroline Bricker	United States	2:07.59	
7	2	Emily Richards	Great Britain	2:07.99	
8	6	Ellen Walshe	Ireland	2:08.34	
