= Swimming at the 2020 European Aquatics Championships – Women's 200 metre butterfly =

Women's 200 metre butterfly at the 2020 European Aquatics Championships
- Venue: Danube Arena
- Dates: 19 May 2021 (heats and semifinals); 20 May 2021 (final)
- Competitors: 28 from 18 nations
- Winning time: 2:06.50

Medalists
gold medal	Boglárka Kapás	Hungary
silver medal	Katinka Hosszú	Hungary
bronze medal	Svetlana Chimrova	Russia

The Women's 200 metre butterfly competition of the 2020 European Aquatics Championships was held on 19 and 20 May 2021.

== Records ==
Before the competition, the existing world, European and championship records were as follows.

	Name	Nationality	Time	Location	Date
World record	Liu Zige	China	2:01.81	Jinan	20 October 2009
European record	Katinka Hosszú	Hungary	2:04.27	Rome	29 July 2009
Championship record	Mireia Belmonte	Spain	2:04.79	Berlin	24 August 2014

== Results ==
=== Heats ===
The heats were started on 19 May at 10:18.

Rank	Heat	Lane	Name	Nationality	Time	Notes
1	2	4	Boglárka Kapás	Hungary	2:07.61	Q
2	3	4	Katinka Hosszú	Hungary	2:08.36	Q
3	2	5	Laura Stephens	Great Britain	2:09.15	Q
4	3	5	Zsuzsanna Jakabos	Hungary	2:09.35	
5	3	6	Helena Rosendahl Bach	Denmark	2:09.42	Q
6	1	5	Svetlana Chimrova	Russia	2:09.48	Q
7	1	3	Keanna MacInnes	Great Britain	2:09.82	Q
8	2	6	Ilaria Cusinato	Italy	2:10.18	Q
9	2	3	Ana Monteiro	Portugal	2:10.73	Q
10	2	7	Dóra Hatházi	Hungary	2:10.75	
11	1	2	Kathrin Demler	Germany	2:10.84	Q
12	1	7	Nida Eliz Üstündağ	Turkey	2:11.02	Q
13	3	3	Emily Large	Great Britain	2:11.08	
14	1	4	Alys Thomas	Great Britain	2:11.51	
15	2	2	Antonella Crispino	Italy	2:11.85	Q
16	3	1	Klaudia Naziębło	Poland	2:12.82	Q
17	3	2	Claudia Hufnagl	Austria	2:12.87	Q
18	1	8	Carlota Torrontegui	Spain	2:13.33	Q
19	2	1	Anna Ntountounaki	Greece	2:14.69	Q, WD
20	3	8	Amina Kajtaz	Bosnia and Herzegovina	2:14.98	Q
21	2	0	Fanny Borer	Switzerland	2:15.83	Q
22	2	8	Aleksandra Knop	Poland	2:16.09	
22	3	7	Laura Lahtinen	Finland	2:16.09	
24	1	0	Iva Hrsto	Croatia	2:17.04	
25	3	0	Tamara Schaad	Switzerland	2:17.48	
26	1	1	Viktoriya Kostromina	Ukraine	2:19.20	
27	3	9	Iman Avdić	Bosnia and Herzegovina	2:23.73	
28	2	9	Katie Rock	Albania	2:30.07	
	1	6	Defne Taçyıldız	Turkey	Did not start	

=== Semifinals ===
The semifinals were held on 19 May at 18:44.

==== Semifinal 1 ====
Rank	Lane	Name	Nationality	Time	Notes
1	4	Katinka Hosszú	Hungary	2:08.75	Q
2	5	Helena Rosendahl Bach	Denmark	2:08.95	Q
3	3	Keanna MacInnes	Great Britain	2:09.76	q
4	6	Ana Monteiro	Portugal	2:10.07	
5	2	Nida Eliz Üstündağ	Turkey	2:10.11	
6	7	Klaudia Naziębło	Poland	2:12.57	
7	1	Carlota Torrontegui	Spain	2:14.53	
8	8	Fanny Borer	Switzerland	2:15.79	

==== Semifinal 2 ====
Rank	Lane	Name	Nationality	Time	Notes
1	4	Boglárka Kapás	Hungary	2:07.25	Q
2	3	Svetlana Chimrova	Russia	2:09.08	Q
3	6	Ilaria Cusinato	Italy	2:09.32	q
4	5	Laura Stephens	Great Britain	2:09.39	q
5	2	Kathrin Demler	Germany	2:09.59	q
6	7	Antonella Crispino	Italy	2:10.74	
7	1	Claudia Hufnagl	Austria	2:12.32	
8	8	Amina Kajtaz	Bosnia and Herzegovina	2:15.52	

=== Final ===
The final was held on 20 May at 18:00.

Rank	Lane	Name	Nationality	Time	Notes
1st place, gold medalist(s)	4	Boglárka Kapás	Hungary	2:06.50	
2nd place, silver medalist(s)	5	Katinka Hosszú	Hungary	2:08.14	
3rd place, bronze medalist(s)	6	Svetlana Chimrova	Russia	2:08.55	
4	3	Helena Rosendahl Bach	Denmark	2:08.89	
5	2	Ilaria Cusinato	Italy	2:08.91	
6	7	Laura Stephens	Great Britain	2:09.42	
7	1	Kathrin Demler	Germany	2:09.94	
8	8	Keanna MacInnes	Great Britain	2:10.25	
