= 2022 FINA World Swimming Championships (25 m) – Women's 200 metre butterfly =

Swimming competition

Women's 200 metre butterfly at the 2022 FINA World Swimming Championships (25 m)
- Venue: Melbourne Sports and Aquatic Centre
- Location: Melbourne, Australia
- Dates: 15 December (heats and final)
- Competitors: 25 from 22 nations
- Winning time: 2:03.37

Medalists
gold medal	Dakota Luther	United States
silver medal	Hali Flickinger	United States
bronze medal	Elizabeth Dekkers	Australia

The Women's 200 metre butterfly competition of the 2022 FINA World Swimming Championships (25 m) was held on 15 December 2022.

== Records ==
Prior to the competition, the existing world and championship records were as follows.

World record	Mireia Belmonte (ESP)	1:59.61	Doha, Qatar	3 December 2014
Competition record	Mireia Belmonte (ESP)	1:59.61	Doha, Qatar	3 December 2014

== Results ==
=== Heats ===
The heats were started at 11:31.

Rank	Heat	Lane	Name	Nationality	Time	Notes
1	4	2	Dakota Luther	United States	2:03.73	Q
2	3	4	Hali Flickinger	United States	2:04.66	Q
3	2	5	Helena Rosendahl Bach	Denmark	2:05.09	Q
4	3	3	Laura Lahtinen	Finland	2:05.13	Q, NR
5	2	4	Airi Mitsui	Japan	2:05.27	Q
6	4	5	Karin Uchida	Japan	2:05.38	Q
7	4	6	Elizabeth Dekkers	Australia	2:05.41	Q
8	3	5	Lana Pudar	Bosnia and Herzegovina	2:05.87	Q
9	2	6	Laura Taylor	Australia	2:05.94	
10	4	3	Ilaria Cusinato	Italy	2:06.01	
11	2	2	Amina Kajtaz	Croatia	2:06.90	NR
12	4	4	Zhang Yifan	China	2:07.05	
13	3	6	Zsuzsanna Jakabos	Hungary	2:07.08	
14	2	3	Katerine Savard	Canada	2:08.51	
15	4	7	Nida Eliz Üstündağ	Turkey	2:09.14	
16	3	2	Giovanna Diamante	Brazil	2:09.60	
17	2	1	Dakota Tucker	South Africa	2:11.34	
18	1	5	Krystal Lara	Dominican Republic	2:11.43	NR
19	3	7	Zora Ripková	Slovakia	2:11.72	
20	3	1	Luana Alonso	Paraguay	2:12.19	NR
21	4	1	Anja Crevar	Serbia	2:12.43	
22	4	8	Yeung Hoi Ching	Hong Kong	2:12.57	
23	2	7	María Fe Muñoz	Peru	2:16.82	
24	1	3	Amaya Bollinger	Guam	2:35.87	
	1	4	Esme Paterson	New Zealand	Disqualified	

=== Final ===
The final was held at 20:14.

Rank	Lane	Name	Nationality	Time	Notes
1st place, gold medalist(s)	4	Dakota Luther	United States	2:03.37	
2nd place, silver medalist(s)	5	Hali Flickinger	United States	2:03.78	
3rd place, bronze medalist(s)	1	Elizabeth Dekkers	Australia	2:03.94	
4	3	Helena Rosendahl Bach	Denmark	2:04.41	
5	8	Lana Pudar	Bosnia and Herzegovina	2:05.23	
6	2	Airi Mitsui	Japan	2:05.40	
7	7	Karin Uchida	Japan	2:05.51	
8	6	Laura Lahtinen	Finland	2:06.48	
