= Swimming at the 2023 World Aquatics Championships – Women's 100 metre butterfly =

Women's 100 metre butterfly at the 2023 World Aquatics Championships
- Venue: Marine Messe Fukuoka
- Location: Fukuoka, Japan
- Dates: 23 July (heats and semifinals); 24 July (final)
- Competitors: 49 from 43 nations
- Winning time: 56.12

Medalists
gold medal	Zhang Yufei	China
silver medal	Maggie Mac Neil	Canada
bronze medal	Torri Huske	United States

The women's 100 metre butterfly competition at the 2023 World Aquatics Championships was held on 23 and 24 July 2023.

== Records ==
Prior to the competition, the existing world and championship records were as follows.

World record	Sarah Sjöström (SWE)	55.48	Rio de Janeiro, Brazil	7 August 2016
Competition record	Sarah Sjöström (SWE)	55.53	Budapest, Hungary	24 July 2017

== Results ==
=== Heats ===
The heats were started on 23 July at 11:21.

Rank	Heat	Lane	Name	Nationality	Time	Notes
1	3	5	Zhang Yufei	China	56.89	Q
2	4	5	Emma McKeon	Australia	57.05	Q
3	5	6	Angelina Köhler	Germany	57.23	Q
4	5	3	Louise Hansson	Sweden	57.49	Q
5	5	5	Maggie Mac Neil	Canada	57.56	Q
6	5	4	Torri Huske	United States	57.66	Q
7	3	3	Wang Yichun	China	57.72	Q
8	3	4	Gretchen Walsh	United States	57.74	Q
9	4	3	Brianna Throssell	Australia	57.94	Q
10	4	6	Lana Pudar	Bosnia and Herzegovina	57.95	Q
11	4	4	Marie Wattel	France	58.02	Q
12	4	7	Anna Ntountounaki	Greece	58.12	Q
13	3	6	Ai Soma	Japan	58.17	Q
14	3	0	Amina Kajtaz	Croatia	58.50	Q, NR
15	4	8	Helena Rosendahl Bach	Denmark	58.55	Q
16	3	2	Katerine Savard	Canada	58.56	Q
17	4	2	Rikako Ikee	Japan	58.61	
18	4	1	Ilaria Bianchi	Italy	58.62	
19	5	2	Farida Osman	Egypt	59.09	
20	5	1	Keanna Macinnes	Great Britain	59.30	
21	3	1	Paulina Peda	Poland	59.34	
22	5	0	Barbora Seemanová	Czech Republic	59.36	
23	5	7	Giovanna Diamante	Brazil	59.39	
24	3	7	Ellen Walshe	Ireland	59.39	
25	3	8	Quah Jing Wen	Singapore	59.60	
26	5	8	Hazel Ouwehand	New Zealand	59.81	
27	4	0	Paula Juste	Spain	59.94	
28	3	9	Park Su-jin	South Korea	1:00.20	
29	2	3	Trinity Hearne	South Africa	1:00.27	
30	4	9	Zsuzsanna Jakabos	Hungary	1:00.51	
31	2	5	Laura Lahtinen	Finland	1:00.56	
32	5	9	Athena Meneses	Mexico	1:00.95	
33	2	4	Luana Alonso	Paraguay	1:01.16	
34	2	2	Olivia Borg	Samoa	1:01.80	NR
35	2	6	Jasmine Alkhaldi	Suspended Member Federation	1:01.94	
36	2	1	Sabrina Lyn	Jamaica	1:02.13	
37	1	4	Varsenik Manucharyan	Armenia	1:02.41	NR
38	1	5	María Schutzmeier	Nicaragua	1:02.56	
39	2	9	Isabella Alas	El Salvador	1:02.85	
40	2	7	Oumy Diop	Senegal	1:03.14	
41	1	8	Felicity Passon	Seychelles	1:03.15	
42	2	8	Emily Muteti	Suspended Member Federation	1:03.17	
43	2	0	Julimar Ávila	Honduras	1:03.52	
44	1	3	Lia Ana Lima	Angola	1:04.88	
45	1	6	Adriana Giles	Bolivia	1:05.70	
46	1	7	Hayley Hoy	Eswatini	1:09.14	
47	1	2	Hayley Wong	Brunei	1:09.52	
48	1	1	Tara Naluwoza	Uganda	1:09.69	
49	1	0	Alyse Maniriho	Burundi	1:29.91	

=== Semifinals ===
The semifinals were started on 23 July at 20:12.

Rank	Heat	Lane	Name	Nationality	Time	Notes
1	2	4	Zhang Yufei	China	56.40	Q
2	1	3	Torri Huske	United States	56.76	Q
3	2	3	Maggie Mac Neil	Canada	56.78	Q
4	1	4	Emma McKeon	Australia	56.89	Q
5	2	5	Angelina Köhler	Germany	57.05	Q, NR
6	1	6	Gretchen Walsh	United States	57.14	Q
6	2	2	Brianna Throssell	Australia	57.14	Q
8	2	7	Marie Wattel	France	57.17	Q
9	1	5	Louise Hansson	Sweden	57.29	
10	1	2	Lana Pudar	Bosnia and Herzegovina	57.34	
11	2	6	Wang Yichun	China	57.74	
12	1	7	Anna Ntountounaki	Greece	57.97	
13	1	8	Katerine Savard	Canada	58.18	
14	2	1	Ai Soma	Japan	58.27	
15	1	1	Amina Kajtaz	Croatia	58.49	NR
16	2	8	Helena Rosendahl Bach	Denmark	58.54	

=== Final ===
The final was held on 24 July at 20:09.

Rank	Lane	Name	Nationality	Time	Notes
1st place, gold medalist(s)	4	Zhang Yufei	China	56.12	
2nd place, silver medalist(s)	3	Maggie Mac Neil	Canada	56.45	
3rd place, bronze medalist(s)	5	Torri Huske	United States	56.61	
4	6	Emma McKeon	Australia	56.88	
5	2	Angelina Köhler	Germany	57.05	=NR
6	8	Marie Wattel	France	57.13	
7	1	Brianna Throssell	Australia	57.34	
8	7	Gretchen Walsh	United States	57.58	
