= Swimming at the 2026 European Aquatics Championships – Women's 200 metre butterfly =

Women's 200 metre butterfly at the 2026 European Aquatics Championships
- Venue: Paris Aquatic Centre
- Dates: 15 August (heats and semifinals); 16 August (final)
- Winning time: 2:05.90

Medalists
gold medal	Keanna MacInnes	Great Britain
silver medal	Helena Rosendahl Bach	Denmark
bronze medal	Laura Cabanes	Spain

The Women's 200 metre butterfly competition of the 2026 European Aquatics Championships will be held on 15 and 16 August 2026.

== Records ==
Prior to the competition, the existing world, European and championship records were as follows.

	Name	Nation	Time	Location	Date
World record	Summer McIntosh	Canada	2:01.65	Montreal	5 July 2026
European record	Katinka Hosszú	Hungary	2:04.27	Rome	29 July 2009
Championship record	Mireia Belmonte	Spain	2:04.79	Berlin	24 August 2014

== Results ==
=== Heats ===
The heats were started on 15 August at 09:48.
Qualification Rules: The 16 fastest from the heats qualify to semifinals.

Rank	Heat	Lane	Swimmer	Country	Time	Notes
1	2	4	Helena Rosendahl Bach	Denmark	2:08.42	Q
2	1	4	Paola Borrelli	Italy	2:08.69	Q
3	1	5	Laura Cabanes	Spain	2:08.83	Q
4	2	5	Emily Richards	Great Britain	2:09.56	Q
5	3	4	Keanna MacInnes	Great Britain	2:10.32	Q
6	2	2	Lana Pudar	Bosnia and Herzegovina	2:10.92	Q
7	1	2	Giada Alzetta	Italy	2:11.46	Q
8	3	6	Boróka Kertész	Hungary	2:11.62	Q
9	3	5	Ellen Walshe	Ireland	2:11.81	Q
10	3	3	Georgia Damasioti	Greece	2:11.92	Q
11	1	3	Sarah Dumont	Belgium	2:12.18	Q
12	3	1	Yara Fay Riefstahl	Germany	2:12.87	Q
13	3	2	Aleksandra Knop	Poland	2:12.89	Q
14	1	6	Evy Rozeboom	Netherlands	2:12.94	Q
15	3	7	Amina Kajtaz	Croatia	2:13.41	Q
16	1	7	Laura Lahtinen	Finland	2:13.88	Q
17	3	8	Ieva Maluka	Latvia	2:13.95	R
18	2	3	Vivien Jackl	Hungary	2:13.96	R
19	2	1	Fanny Borer	Switzerland	2:14.88	
20	2	7	Lea Polonsky	Israel	2:15.61	
21	2	9	Aliisa Soini	Finland	2:16.29	
22	2	8	Tea Winblad	Sweden	2:16.59	
23	1	8	Ana Nizharadze	Georgia	2:17.37	
24	3	0	Marthe Cecilie Willumsen	Norway	2:17.57	
25	1	0	Iman Avdic	Bosnia and Herzegovina	2:19.02	
26	2	0	Alana Burns-Atkin	Ireland	2:24.03	
-	1	1	Justina Kozan	Poland	DNS	
-	2	6	Anita Gastaldi	Italy	DNS	
-	3	9	Gaia Rasmussen	Switzerland	DNS	

=== Semifinals ===
The semifinals were started on 15 August at 19:52.
Qualification Rules: The 8 fastest from the heats qualify to the final.

Rank	Heat	Lane	Swimmer	Country	Time	Notes
1	1	5	Emily Richards	Great Britain	2:07.10	Q
2	2	4	Helena Rosendahl Bach	Denmark	2:07.18	Q
3	2	5	Laura Cabanes	Spain	2:07.53	Q
4	2	3	Keanna MacInnes	Great Britain	2:07.61	Q
5	2	2	Ellen Walshe	Ireland	2:08.96	Q
6	1	4	Paola Borrelli	Italy	2:08.97	Q
7	1	3	Lana Pudar	Bosnia and Herzegovina	2:09.65	Q
8	2	7	Sarah Dumont	Belgium	2:09.95	Q
9	1	6	Boróka Kertész	Hungary	2:09.96	
10	2	6	Giada Alzetta	Italy	2:10.36	
11	1	2	Georgia Damasioti	Greece	2:11.06	
12	2	1	Aleksandra Knop	Poland	2:11.23	
13	1	1	Evy Rozeboom	Netherlands	2:11.90	
14	1	7	Yara Fay Riefstahl	Germany	2:13.04	
15	2	8	Amina Kajtaz	Croatia	2:13.78	
16	1	8	Laura Lahtinen	Finland	2:15.49	

=== Final ===
The final was held on the evening of 16 August.

Rank	Lane	Name	Nationality	Time	Notes
1st place, gold medalist(s)	6	Keanna MacInnes	Great Britain	2:05.90	
2nd place, silver medalist(s)	5	Helena Rosendahl Bach	Denmark	2:06.14	NR
3rd place, bronze medalist(s)	3	Laura Cabanes	Spain	2:07.21	
4	2	Ellen Walshe	Ireland	2:07.40	NR
5	4	Emily Richards	Great Britain	2:07.77	
6	7	Paola Borrelli	Italy	2:08.23	
7	1	Lana Pudar	Bosnia and Herzegovina	2:11.14	
8	8	Sarah Dumont	Belgium	2:11.18	
