= Swimming at the 2024 Summer Olympics – Women's 100-metre butterfly =

Women's 100-metre butterfly at the Games of the XXXIII Olympiad
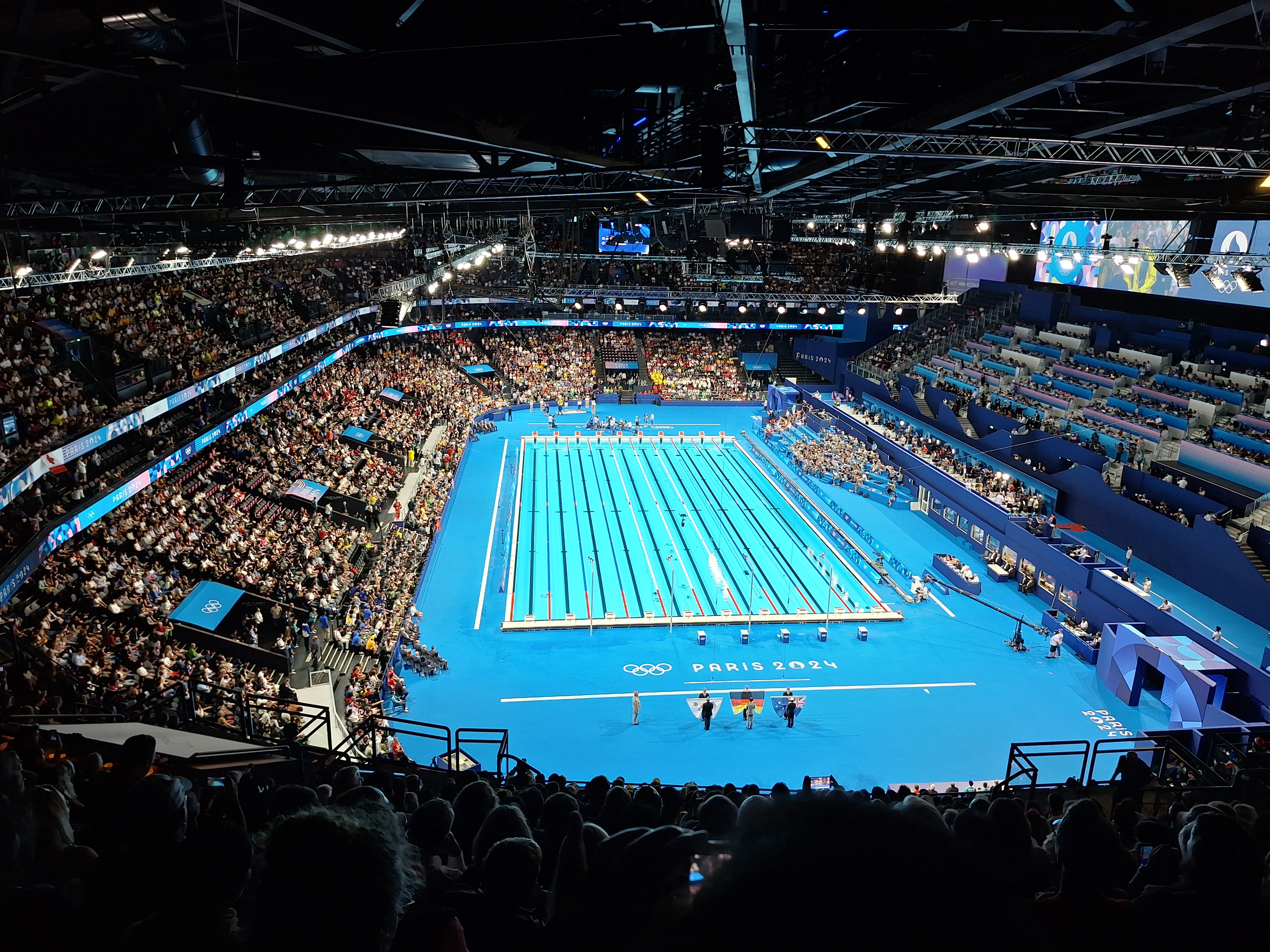
- Paris La Défense Arena after it was converted to a swimming pool for the swimming events
- Venue: Paris La Défense Arena
- Dates: 27 July 2024 (Heats and Semis); 28 July 2024 (Final)
- Competitors: 32 from 26 nations
- Winning time: 55.59

Medalists
1st place, gold medalist(s)		Torri Huske	United States
2nd place, silver medalist(s)		Gretchen Walsh	United States
3rd place, bronze medalist(s)		Zhang Yufei	China

The women's 100-metre butterfly event at the 2024 Summer Olympics was held from 27 to 28 July 2024 at Paris La Défense Arena, which was converted to a swimming pool for the swimming events.

Going into the competition, Gretchen Walsh of the US was the favourite, having set the event's world record at the Olympic Trials. Also among the favourites were China's Zhang Yufei and US' Torri Huske, while Canada's Maggie Mac Neil was the defending champion. In the semifinals, Walsh set a new Olympic record, but in the finals, Huske won by 0.04 seconds after coming back from over half a second behind over the last 35 metres. Walsh finished second, and Zhang finished third. Swimming World called Huske's win a "stunning victory", and it was the first time the US had won gold and silver in the event since 1984.

Two national records were set during the event: Barbora Seemanová broke the Czech Republic's record in the heats, and Roos Vanotterdijk broke Belgium's in the semifinals.

== Background ==
Canada's Maggie Mac Neil was the defending champion going into the event, and six of the finalists (including Mac Neil) from the previous Olympics were returning. Gretchen Walsh set a world record in the event at the 2024 US Olympic Trials, where Torri Huske had swum 0.21 seconds slower to claim the second qualification spot for the US. Huske also won gold at the 2022 World Championships, while China's Zhang Yufei—who also qualified for this event—won gold at the 2023 World Championships. Both SwimSwam and Swimming World predicted that Gretchen Walsh was most likely to win the race.

The event was held at Paris La Défense Arena, which was converted to a swimming pool for the swimming events.

== Qualification ==
Each National Olympic Committee (NOC) was permitted to enter a maximum of two qualified athletes in each individual event, but only if both of them had attained the Olympic Qualifying Time (OQT). For this event, the OQT was 57.92 seconds. World Aquatics then considered athletes qualifying through universality; NOCs were given one event entry for each gender, which could be used by any athlete regardless of qualification time, providing the spaces had not already been taken by athletes from that nation who had achieved the OQT. Finally, the rest of the spaces were filled by athletes who had met the Olympic Consideration Time (OCT), which was 58.21 for this event. In total, 40 athletes qualified through achieving the OQT, 35 athletes qualified through universality places and two athletes qualified through achieving the OCT.

Top 10 fastest qualification times
Swimmer	Country	Time	Competition
Gretchen Walsh	United States	55:18	2024 United States Olympic Trials
Torri Huske	United States	55:52	2024 United States Olympic Trials
Zhang Yufei	China	55:86	2022 Asian Games
Angelina Köhler	Germany	56:11	2024 World Aquatics Championships
Maggie Mac Neil	Canada	56:45	2023 World Aquatics Championships
Emma McKeon	Australia	56:58	2024 Australian Championships
Yu Yiting	China	56:82	2024 Chinese Championships
Mizuki Hirai	Japan	56:91	2024 Japanese Olympic Trials
Louise Hansson	Sweden	56:94	2024 World Aquatics Championships
Lana Pudar	Bosnia and Herzegovina	56:95	2023 European Junior Championships

== Heats ==
Four heats (preliminary rounds) took place on 27 July 2024, starting at 11:00. (Note: All times are Central European Summer Time (UTC+2)) The swimmers with the best 16 times in the heats advanced to the semifinals. Zhang qualified fastest, swimming 56.50 seconds, while Barbora Seemanová lowered her national record for the Czech Republic by swimming 57.50—0.25 faster than her previous national record from the year prior.

Results
Rank	Heat	Lane	Swimmer	Nation	Time	Notes
1	2	4	Zhang Yufei	China	56.50	Q
2	4	3	Mizuki Hirai	Japan	56.71	Q
3	3	4	Torri Huske	United States	56.72	Q
4	4	4	Gretchen Walsh	United States	56.75	Q
5	2	5	Emma McKeon	Australia	56.79	Q
6	4	5	Angelina Köhler	Germany	56.90	Q
7	3	5	Maggie Mac Neil	Canada	57.00	Q
8	3	6	Alexandria Perkins	Australia	57.46	Q
9	4	1	Barbora Seemanová	Czech Republic	57.50	Q, NR
10	2	6	Marie Wattel	France	57.54	Q
10	4	7	Roos Vanotterdijk	Belgium	57.54	Q
12	3	3	Louise Hansson	Sweden	57.57	Q
13	4	2	Erin Gallagher	South Africa	57.80	Q
14	4	6	Rikako Ikee	Japan	57.82	Q
15	3	2	Tessa Giele	Netherlands	57.89	Q
16	3	8	Keanna Macinnes	Great Britain	57.90	Q
17	2	3	Lana Pudar	Bosnia and Herzegovina	57.97	
18	2	2	Hazel Ouwehand	New Zealand	58.03	
19	3	7	Anna Ntountounaki	Greece	58.14	
20	1	4	Helena Rosendahl Bach	Denmark	58.45	
21	3	1	Costanza Cocconcelli	Italy	58.66	
22	2	8	Ellen Walshe	Ireland	58.70	
23	2	7	Georgia Damasioti	Greece	58.72	
24	4	8	Rebecca Smith	Canada	58.85	
25	1	5	Laura Cabanes	Spain	59.40	
26	1	6	Varsenik Manucharyan	Armenia	1:01.24	NR
27	1	2	Oumy Diop	Senegal	1:02.24	
28	1	1	Ana Nizharadze	Georgia	1:02.85	
29	1	3	Luana Alonso	Paraguay	1:03.09	
30	1	7	María Schutzmeier	Nicaragua	1:03.18	
31	1	8	Hayley Hoy	Eswatini	1:08.36	
	2	1	Viola Scotto Di Carlo	Italy	DSQ	

=== Semifinals ===
Two semifinals took place on 27 July, starting at 20:30. The swimmers with the best eight times in the semifinals advanced to the final. Walsh qualified with an Olympic Record of 55.38 seconds, which broke Sarah Sjöström's record from 2016 by 0.10. Huske qualified in second, and Zhang in third. Roos Vanotterdijk broke the Belgian national record by swimming 57.25 seconds. This was 0.22 seconds faster than her previous national record set the month prior but was not enough to qualify.

Results
Rank	Heat	Lane	Swimmer	Nation	Time	Notes
1	1	5	Gretchen Walsh	United States	55.38	Q, OR
2	2	5	Torri Huske	United States	56.00	Q
3	2	4	Zhang Yufei	China	56.15	Q
4	1	3	Angelina Köhler	Germany	56.55	Q
4	2	6	Maggie Mac Neil	Canada	56.55	Q
6	2	3	Emma McKeon	Australia	56.74	Q
7	1	4	Mizuki Hirai	Japan	56.80	Q
8	1	7	Louise Hansson	Sweden	56.93	Q
9	1	2	Marie Wattel	France	57.24	
10	2	7	Roos Vanotterdijk	Belgium	57.25	NR
11	2	2	Barbora Seemanová	Czech Republic	57.64	
12	1	1	Rikako Ikee	Japan	57.79	
13	1	6	Alexandria Perkins	Australia	57.84	
14	2	1	Erin Gallagher	South Africa	57.90	
15	2	8	Tessa Giele	Netherlands	57.91	
16	1	8	Keanna Macinnes	Great Britain	58.11	

=== Final ===
The final took place at 20:40 on 28 July. Torri Huske started with the fastest reaction time of 0.63 seconds, but by 15 metres Gretchen Walsh had taken first place with a faster dive and underwater. By 25 metres, Zhang Yufei had taken the lead, but by 45 metres Walsh was back in front. At 65 metres (after the second turn and underwater) Walsh was over half a second ahead, having swum a 8.10 50–65 metre split, which was 0.5 seconds faster than anyone else in the race. Over the last 35 metres, Huske came from 0.69 behind to win by 0.04 seconds, pushing Walsh to second and Zhang to third. Matt Nelson, a journalist reporting on olympics.com, called the win a "stunning victory", while David Rieder of Swimming World said "It was a result three years in the making." It was the first time the US had won gold and silver in the event since 1984, and it was Walsh's first Olympic medal.

Results
Rank	Lane	Swimmer	Nation	Time	Notes
1st place, gold medalist(s)	5	Torri Huske	United States	55.59	
2nd place, silver medalist(s)	4	Gretchen Walsh	United States	55.63	
3rd place, bronze medalist(s)	3	Zhang Yufei	China	56.21	
4	6	Angelina Köhler	Germany	56.42	
5	2	Maggie Mac Neil	Canada	56.44	
6	7	Emma McKeon	Australia	56.93	
7	1	Mizuki Hirai	Japan	57.19	
8	8	Louise Hansson	Sweden	57.34	

Statistics
Name	15 metre split (s)	50 metre split (s)	50–65 metre split (s)	Time (s)	Stroke rate (strokes/min)
Torri Huske	6.01	25.61	8.58	55.59	57.7
Gretchen Walsh	5.83	25.40	8.10	55.63	55.1
Zhang Yufei	5.95	25.42	8.65	56.21	61.9
Angelina Köhler	6.22	26.35	8.84	56.42	56.5
Maggie Mac Neil	6.27	25.94	8.43	56.44	61.0
Emma McKeon	6.17	26.40	8.69	56.93	54.3
Mizuki Hirai	6.45	26.66	8.51	57.19	59.8
Louise Hansson	6.18	26.61	8.61	57.34	56.4
