= 2021 FINA World Swimming Championships (25 m) – Women's 200 metre butterfly =

Swimming competition

Women's 200 metre butterfly at the 2021 FINA World Swimming Championships (25 m)
- Venue: Etihad Arena
- Location: Abu Dhabi, United Arab Emirates
- Dates: 17 December (heats and final)
- Competitors: 34 from 29 nations
- Winning time: 2:03.01

Medalists
gold medal	Zhang Yufei	China
silver medal	Charlotte Hook	United States
bronze medal	Lana Pudar	Bosnia and Herzegovina

The Women's 200 metre butterfly competition of the 2021 FINA World Swimming Championships (25 m) was held on 17 December 2021.

== Records ==
Prior to the competition, the existing world and championship records were as follows.

World record	Mireia Belmonte (ESP)	1:59.61	Doha, Qatar	3 December 2014
Competition record	Mireia Belmonte (ESP)	1:59.61	Doha, Qatar	3 December 2014

== Results ==
=== Heats ===
The heats were started at 10:44.

Rank	Heat	Lane	Name	Nationality	Time	Notes
1	2	4	Svetlana Chimrova	Russian Swimming Federation	2:05.12	Q
2	4	4	Zhang Yufei	China	2:05.73	Q
3	2	5	Anastasiia Markova	Russian Swimming Federation	2:05.97	Q
4	3	5	Lana Pudar	Bosnia and Herzegovina	2:06.07	Q
5	2	3	Maria Ugolkova	Switzerland	2:06.26	Q, NR
6	4	5	Zsuzsanna Jakabos	Hungary	2:06.41	Q
7	4	3	Charlotte Hook	United States	2:06.55	Q
8	3	7	Ilaria Cusinato	Italy	2:06.60	Q
9	2	2	Zhu Jiaming	China	2:06.92	
10	3	4	Ilaria Bianchi	Italy	2:07.20	
11	4	1	Giovanna Diamante	Brazil	2:07.28	
12	3	8	María José Mata	Mexico	2:07.34	
13	3	3	Katerine Savard	Canada	2:07.38	
14	2	8	Ellen Walshe	Ireland	2:08.16	
14	4	8	Catalina Corró	Spain	2:08.16	
16	2	6	Ana Monteiro	Portugal	2:08.85	
17	3	6	Claudia Hufnagl	Austria	2:09.23	
18	4	6	Laura Lahtinen	Finland	2:09.30	
19	1	4	Anja Crevar	Serbia	2:09.33	NR
20	3	0	Kim Seo-yeong	South Korea	2:09.41	
21	2	0	Jinjutha Pholjamjumrus	Thailand	2:10.05	NR
22	4	2	Katja Fain	Slovenia	2:10.30	
23	3	1	Defne Taçyıldız	Turkey	2:10.52	
24	3	2	Tessa Cieplucha	Canada	2:11.06	
25	1	3	Zora Ripková	Slovakia	2:11.41	
26	2	1	Nida Eliz Üstündağ	Turkey	2:11.49	
27	2	7	Lara Grangeon	France	2:11.78	
28	4	0	Georgia Damasioti	Greece	2:12.00	
29	3	9	Lê Thị Mỹ Thảo	Vietnam	2:12.35	
30	1	2	Julimar Ávila	Honduras	2:12.90	
31	1	5	Alexandra Dobrin	Romania	3:12.96	
32	1	7	Alondra Ortíz	Costa Rica	2:14.66	
33	2	9	Chan Kin Lok	Hong Kong	2:18.01	
34	1	6	Lia Ana Lima	Angola	2:24.40	
	4	7	Quah Jing Wen	Singapore	DNS	
	4	9	María Fe Muñoz	Spain	DNS	

=== Final ===
The final was held at 18:13.

Rank	Lane	Name	Nationality	Time	Notes
1st place, gold medalist(s)	5	Zhang Yufei	China	2:03.01	
2nd place, silver medalist(s)	1	Charlotte Hook	United States	2:04.35	
3rd place, bronze medalist(s)	6	Lana Pudar	Bosnia and Herzegovina	2:04.88	NR
4	4	Svetlana Chimrova	Russian Swimming Federation	2:05.65	
5	3	Anastasiia Markova	Russian Swimming Federation	2:06.29	
6	7	Zsuzsanna Jakabos	Hungary	2:06.82	
6	8	Ilaria Cusinato	Italy	2:06.82	
8	2	Maria Ugolkova	Switzerland	2:07.01	
