= Swimming at the 2022 European Aquatics Championships – Women's 100 metre butterfly =

Sporting Event

Women's 100 metre butterfly at the 2022 European Aquatics Championships
- Venue: Foro Italico
- Dates: 14 August (heats and semifinals); 15 August (final)
- Competitors: 35 from 23 nations
- Winning time: 56.66

Medalists
gold medal	Louise Hansson	Sweden
silver medal	Marie Wattel	France
bronze medal	Lana Pudar	Bosnia and Herzegovina

The Women's 100 metre butterfly competition of the 2022 European Aquatics Championships was held on 14 and 15 August 2022.

== Records ==
Prior to the competition, the existing world, European and championship records were as follows.

	Name	Nationality	Time	Location	Date
World record	Sarah Sjöström	Sweden	55.48	Rio de Janeiro	7 August 2016
European record	Sarah Sjöström	Sweden	55.48	Rio de Janeiro	7 August 2016
Championship record	Sarah Sjöström	Sweden	55.89	London	20 May 2016

== Results ==
=== Heats ===
The heats were started on 14 August at 09:23.

Rank	Heat	Lane	Name	Nationality	Time	Notes
1	3	4	Louise Hansson	Sweden	57.46	Q
2	4	4	Marie Wattel	France	57.85	Q
3	3	5	Lana Pudar	Bosnia and Herzegovina	58.29	Q
4	4	5	Elena Di Liddo	Italy	58.43	Q
5	2	5	Ilaria Bianchi	Italy	58.46	Q
6	3	3	Angelina Köhler	Germany	58.47	Q
7	3	2	Costanza Cocconcelli	Italy	58.89	
7	2	2	Keanna MacInnes	Great Britain	58.89	Q
9	3	6	Maaike de Waard	Netherlands	58.90	Q
10	4	2	Tessa Giele	Netherlands	58.97	Q
11	4	3	Roos Vanotterdijk	Belgium	59.06	Q
12	3	1	Helena Rosendahl Bach	Denmark	59.15	Q
13	4	7	Sara Junevik	Sweden	59.30	Q
14	2	4	Anna Ntountounaki	Greece	59.33	Q
15	2	3	Maria Ugolkova	Switzerland	59.34	Q
16	2	6	Dalma Sebestyén	Hungary	59.39	Q, WD
17	4	1	Julia Ullmann	Switzerland	59.75	Q
18	3	7	Antonella Crispino	Italy	59.80	
19	2	0	Laura Lahtinen	Finland	59.99	Q, WD
20	2	7	Julia Maik	Poland	1:00.34	Q
21	2	8	Holly Hibbott	Great Britain	1:00.39	
22	4	0	Hanna Rosvall	Sweden	1:00.59	
23	3	8	Ana Monteiro	Portugal	1:00.82	
24	1	4	Marina Jehl	France	1:01.17	
25	3	0	Carla Hurtado	Spain	1:01.36	
26	4	8	Tamara Potocká	Slovakia	1:01.43	
27	3	9	Victorita Bogdaneci	Romania	1:01.46	
28	2	9	Anastasia Tichy	Austria	1:01.74	
29	1	5	Lea Polonsky	Israel	1:02.06	
30	4	9	Ieva Maļuka	Latvia	1:02.12	
31	1	6	Annina Grabher	Switzerland	1:02.53	
32	1	2	Mireia Belmonte	Spain	1:02.73	
33	1	7	Varsenik Manucharyan	Armenia	1:03.09	
34	1	3	Tamara Schaad	Switzerland	1:04.12	
	2	1	Amina Kajtaz	Croatia	Disqualified	
	4	6	Laura Stephens	Great Britain	Did not start	

=== Semifinals ===
The semifinals were started on 14 August at 18:21.

Rank	Heat	Lane	Name	Nationality	Time	Notes
1	1	4	Marie Wattel	France	56.99	Q
2	2	4	Louise Hansson	Sweden	57.54	Q
3	1	3	Angelina Köhler	Germany	58.03	Q
4	2	5	Lana Pudar	Bosnia and Herzegovina	58.06	Q
5	2	3	Ilaria Bianchi	Italy	58.21	q
6	1	2	Roos Vanotterdijk	Belgium	58.42	q
7	2	1	Anna Ntountounaki	Greece	58.48	q
8	2	6	Keanna MacInnes	Great Britain	58.55	q
9	1	1	Maria Ugolkova	Switzerland	58.66	
10	1	5	Elena Di Liddo	Italy	58.68	
11	2	2	Tessa Giele	Netherlands	58.71	
12	2	7	Helena Rosendahl Bach	Denmark	58.80	
13	1	7	Sara Junevik	Sweden	58.97	
14	1	8	Julia Maik	Poland	59.32	
15	1	6	Maaike de Waard	Netherlands	59.46	
16	2	8	Julia Ullmann	Switzerland	59.66	

=== Final ===
The final was held on 15 August at 18:00.

Rank	Lane	Name	Nationality	Time	Notes
1st place, gold medalist(s)	5	Louise Hansson	Sweden	56.66	
2nd place, silver medalist(s)	4	Marie Wattel	France	56.80	
3rd place, bronze medalist(s)	6	Lana Pudar	Bosnia and Herzegovina	57.27	NR
4	3	Angelina Köhler	Germany	57.90	
5	1	Anna Ntountounaki	Greece	57.91	
6	2	Ilaria Bianchi	Italy	58.34	
7	8	Keanna MacInnes	Great Britain	58.68	
8	7	Roos Vanotterdijk	Belgium	58.74	
