= Swimming at the 2024 World Aquatics Championships – Women's 200 metre butterfly =

Women's 200 metre butterfly at the Swimming at the 2024 World Aquatics Championships
- Venue: Aspire Dome
- Location: Doha, Qatar
- Dates: 14 February (heats and semifinals); 15 February (final)
- Competitors: 25 from 23 nations
- Winning time: 2:07.35

Medalists
gold medal	Laura Stephens; Great Britain
silver medal	Helena Rosendahl Bach; Denmark
bronze medal	Lana Pudar; Bosnia and Herzegovina

The Women's 200 metre butterfly competition at the 2024 World Aquatics Championships was held on 14 and 15 February 2024.

== Qualification ==
Each National Federation was permitted to enter a maximum of two qualified athletes in each individual event, but only if both of them had attained the "A" standard qualification time at approved qualifying events. For this event, the "A" standard qualification time was 2:09.21. Federations could enter one athlete into the event if they met the "B" standard qualification time. For this event, the "B" standard qualification time was 2:13.73. Athletes could also enter the event if they had met an "A" or "B" standard in a different event and their Federation had not entered anyone else. Additional considerations applied to Federations who had few swimmers enter through the standard qualification times. Federations in this category could at least enter two men and two women into the competition, all of whom could enter into up to two events.

== Records ==
Prior to the competition, the existing world and championship records were as follows.

World record	Liu Zige (CHN)	2:01.81	Jinan, China	21 October 2009
Competition record	Jessicah Schipper (AUS)	2:03.41	Rome, Italy	30 July 2009

== Results ==
=== Heats ===
The heats were started on 14 February at 10:34.

Rank	Heat	Lane	Name	Nationality	Time	Notes
1	1	4	Helena Rosendahl Bach	Denmark	2:09.21	Q
2	2	4	Laura Stephens	Great Britain	2:09.31	Q
3	1	5	Ma Yonghui	China	2:09.50	Q
4	3	6	Rachel Klinker	United States	2:09.85	Q
5	3	5	Boglárka Kapás	Hungary	2:09.99	Q
6	2	3	Park Su-jin	South Korea	2:10.28	Q
7	2	5	Dalma Sebestyén	Hungary	2:10.34	Q
8	3	4	Lana Pudar	Bosnia and Herzegovina	2:11.05	Q
9	3	3	María José Mata Cocco	Mexico	2:11.08	Q
10	2	6	Anja Crevar	Serbia	2:11.63	Q
11	2	2	Amina Kajtaz	Croatia	2:11.78	Q
12	1	6	Quah Jing Wen	Singapore	2:11.86	Q
13	3	2	Kamonchanok Kwanmuang	Thailand	2:11.97	Q
14	2	1	Laura Lahtinen	Finland	2:12.06	Q
15	1	3	Georgia Damasioti	Greece	2:12.09	Q
16	3	7	Mariana Pacheco	Portugal	2:12.59	Q
17	1	1	Zuzanna Famulok	Poland	2:13.20	
18	3	1	Mok Sze Ki	Hong Kong	2:13.76	
19	2	7	Paula Juste Sánchez	Spain	2:14.25	
20	1	2	Ella Jansen	Canada	2:14.77	
21	3	0	Julimar Ávila	Honduras	2:16.32	
22	3	8	Ana Nizharadze	Georgia	2:22.35	
23	2	0	Inana Soleman	Syria	2:23.21	NR
24	2	8	Lia Ana Lima	Angola	2:23.83	
25	1	8	Amaya Bollinger	Guam	2:38.33	
	1	7	Maria Fernanda Costa	Brazil	Did not start	

=== Semifinals ===
The semifinals were started on 14 February at 20:16.

Rank	Heat	Lane	Name	Nationality	Time	Notes
1	2	4	Helena Rosendahl Bach	Denmark	2:07.45	Q
2	1	5	Rachel Klinker	United States	2:07.70	Q
3	1	4	Laura Stephens	Great Britain	2:07.97	Q
4	2	3	Boglárka Kapás	Hungary	2:08.48	Q
5	2	5	Ma Yonghui	China	2:08.73	Q
6	2	6	Dalma Sebestyén	Hungary	2:09.14	Q
7	1	3	Park Su-jin	South Korea	2:09.22	Q
8	1	6	Lana Pudar	Bosnia and Herzegovina	2:09.42	Q
9	1	2	Anja Crevar	Serbia	2:10.23	
10	1	7	Quah Jing Wen	Singapore	2:10.31	
11	2	2	María José Mata Cocco	Mexico	2:11.17	
12	2	1	Kamonchanok Kwanmuang	Thailand	2:12.14	
13	1	8	Mariana Pacheco	Portugal	2:12.52	
14	2	8	Georgia Damasioti	Greece	2:13.07	
15	2	7	Amina Kajtaz	Croatia	2:13.14	
16	1	1	Laura Lahtinen	Finland	2:14.12	

=== Final ===
The final was held on 15 February at 19:02.

Rank	Lane	Name	Nationality	Time	Notes
1st place, gold medalist(s)	3	Laura Stephens	Great Britain	2:07.35	
2nd place, silver medalist(s)	4	Helena Rosendahl Bach	Denmark	2:07.44	
3rd place, bronze medalist(s)	8	Lana Pudar	Bosnia and Herzegovina	2:07.92	
4	5	Rachel Klinker	United States	2:08.19	
5	2	Ma Yonghui	China	2:08.77	
6	6	Boglárka Kapás	Hungary	2:08.81	
7	7	Dalma Sebestyén	Hungary	2:09.80	
8	1	Park Su-jin	South Korea	2:10.09	

== Sources ==
- "Competition Regulations" (PDF). World Aquatics. Archived (PDF) from the original on 15 February 2026.
