= Swimming at the 2018 European Aquatics Championships – Women's 200 metre butterfly =

Women's 200 metre butterfly at the 2018 European Aquatics Championships
- Venue: Tollcross International Swimming Centre
- Dates: 5 August (heats and semifinals); 6 August (final)
- Competitors: 24 from 16 nations
- Winning time: 2:07.13

Medalists
gold medal	Boglárka Kapás	Hungary
silver medal	Svetlana Chimrova	Russia
bronze medal	Alys Thomas	Great Britain

The Women's 200 metre butterfly competition of the 2018 European Aquatics Championships was held on 5 and 6 August 2018.

== Records ==
Prior to the competition, the existing world and championship records were as follows.

	Name	Nation	Time	Location	Date
World record	Liu Zige	China	2:01.81	Jinan	21 October 2009
European record	Katinka Hosszú	Hungary	2:04.27	Rome	29 July 2009
Championship record	Mireia Belmonte	Spain	2:04.79	Berlin	24 August 2014

== Results ==
=== Heats ===
The heats were held on 4 August at 09:44.

Rank	Heat	Lane	Name	Nationality	Time	Notes
1	2	4	Alys Thomas	Great Britain	2:07.86	Q
2	3	4	Franziska Hentke	Germany	2:08.93	Q
3	3	5	Liliána Szilágyi	Hungary	2:09.02	Q
4	2	5	Boglárka Kapás	Hungary	2:09.29	Q
5	1	6	Zsuzsanna Jakabos	Hungary	2:09.46	
6	1	4	Svetlana Chimrova	Russia	2:10.08	Q
6	2	3	Alessia Polieri	Italy	2:10.08	Q
6	3	3	Ana Catarina Monteiro	Portugal	2:10.08	Q
9	2	6	Ilaria Cusinato	Italy	2:10.34	Q
10	3	6	Ilaria Bianchi	Italy	2:10.43	
11	3	2	Nida Eliz Üstündağ	Turkey	2:10.69	Q
12	1	5	Emily Large	Great Britain	2:11.07	Q
13	1	3	Charlotte Atkinson	Great Britain	2:11.28	
14	1	1	Helena Bach	Denmark	2:12.32	Q
15	1	2	Barbora Závadová	Czech Republic	2:12.61	Q
16	3	7	Zehra-Duru Bilgin	Turkey	2:14.18	Q
17	2	1	Anja Crevar	Serbia	2:14.40	Q
18	3	1	Emilie Løvberg	Norway	2:14.54	Q
19	1	7	Anna Ntountounaki	Greece	2:14.67	Q
20	2	8	Amina Kajtaz	Bosnia and Herzegovina	2:14.85	NR
21	2	7	İmge Erdemli	Turkey	2:16.45	
22	1	8	Alsu Bayramova	Azerbaijan	2:19.14	
23	3	8	Gerda Pak	Estonia	2:21.10	
24	3	0	Beatrice Felici	San Marino	2:27.90	
—	2	2	Claudia Hufnagl	Austria	Did not start	

=== Semifinals ===
The semifinals were started on 5 August at 17:39.

==== Semifinal 1 ====
Rank	Lane	Name	Nationality	Time	Notes
1	4	Franziska Hentke	Germany	2:07.55	Q
2	5	Boglárka Kapás	Hungary	2:07.75	Q
3	6	Ilaria Cusinato	Italy	2:08.84	Q
4	3	Ana Catarina Monteiro	Portugal	2:08.96	Q
5	2	Emily Large	Great Britain	2:11.25	
6	7	Barbora Závadová	Czech Republic	2:11.65	
7	1	Anja Crevar	Serbia	2:13.50	
8	8	Anna Ntountounaki	Greece	2:16.79	

==== Semifinal 2 ====
Rank	Lane	Name	Nationality	Time	Notes
1	4	Alys Thomas	Great Britain	2:07.64	Q
2	6	Svetlana Chimrova	Russia	2:08.57	Q
3	5	Liliána Szilágyi	Hungary	2:08.70	Q
4	3	Alessia Polieri	Italy	2:08.77	Q
5	2	Nida Eliz Üstündağ	Turkey	2:09.69	
6	7	Helena Bach	Denmark	2:13.14	
7	8	Emilie Løvberg	Norway	2:15.50	
8	1	Zehra-Duru Bilgin	Turkey	2:17.96	

=== Final ===
The final was started on 6 August at 17:00.

Rank	Lane	Name	Nationality	Time	Notes
1st place, gold medalist(s)	3	Boglárka Kapás	Hungary	2:07.13	
2nd place, silver medalist(s)	6	Svetlana Chimrova	Russia	2:07.33	NR
3rd place, bronze medalist(s)	5	Alys Thomas	Great Britain	2:07.42	
4	4	Franziska Hentke	Germany	2:07.75	
5	8	Ana Catarina Monteiro	Portugal	2:08.03	
6	2	Liliána Szilágyi	Hungary	2:08.69	
7	1	Ilaria Cusinato	Italy	2:08.91	
8	7	Alessia Polieri	Italy	2:09.25	
