= Swimming at the 2022 European Aquatics Championships – Women's 200 metre butterfly =

Women's 200 metre butterfly at the 2022 European Aquatics Championships
- Venue: Foro Italico
- Dates: 16 August (heats and semifinals); 17 August (final)
- Competitors: 19 from 12 nations
- Winning time: 2:06.81

Medalists
gold medal	Lana Pudar; Bosnia and Herzegovina
silver medal	Helena Rosendahl Bach; Denmark
bronze medal	Ilaria Cusinato; Italy

The Women's 200 metre butterfly competition of the 2022 European Aquatics Championships was held on 16 and 17 August 2022.

== Records ==
Prior to the competition, the existing world, European and championship records were as follows.

	Name	Nationality	Time	Location	Date
World record	Liu Zige	China	2:01.81	Jinan	20 October 2009
European record	Katinka Hosszú	Hungary	2:04.27	Rome	29 July 2009
Championship record	Mireia Belmonte	Spain	2:04.79	Berlin	24 August 2014

== Results ==
=== Heats ===
The heats were started on 16 August at 09:17.

Rank	Heat	Lane	Name	Nationality	Time	Notes
1	1	4	Helena Rosendahl Bach	Denmark	2:08.66	Q
2	1	3	Keanna MacInnes	Great Britain	2:09.72	Q
3	1	5	Ilaria Cusinato	Italy	2:09.75	Q
4	3	4	Laura Stephens	Great Britain	2:10.30	Q
5	2	4	Lana Pudar	Bosnia and Herzegovina	2:10.82	Q
6	2	5	Zsuzsanna Jakabos	Hungary	2:11.02	Q
7	2	6	Antonella Crispino	Italy	2:11.15	Q
8	2	3	Ana Monteiro	Portugal	2:11.40	Q
9	3	6	Holly Hibbott	Great Britain	2:11.41	
10	1	2	Laura Lahtinen	Finland	2:12.44	Q
11	3	5	Katinka Hosszú	Hungary	2:13.59	Q
12	2	7	Júlia Pujadas	Spain	2:13.73	Q
13	2	1	Anastasia Tichy	Austria	2:14.00	Q
14	3	8	Amina Kajtaz	Croatia	2:14.10	Q, NR
15	3	7	Mireia Belmonte	Spain	2:16.75	Q
16	1	7	Fanny Borer	Switzerland	2:16.91	Q
17	2	2	Aleksandra Knop	Poland	2:17.74	Q, WD
18	1	1	Annina Grabher	Switzerland	2:18.91	Q
19	3	1	Tamara Schaad	Switzerland	2:19.00	
	1	6	Réka Nyirádi	Hungary	Did not start	
	3	2	Lea Polonsky	Israel	Did not start	
	3	3	Dalma Sebestyén	Hungary	Did not start	

=== Semifinals ===
The semifinals were started on 16 August at 19:26.

Rank	Heat	Lane	Name	Nationality	Time	Notes
1	2	4	Helena Rosendahl Bach	Denmark	2:08.48	Q
2	1	4	Keanna MacInnes	Great Britain	2:08.90	Q
3	1	5	Laura Stephens	Great Britain	2:09.25	Q
4	2	5	Ilaria Cusinato	Italy	2:09.30	Q
5	2	3	Lana Pudar	Bosnia and Herzegovina	2:10.11	q
6	1	3	Zsuzsanna Jakabos	Hungary	2:10.77	q
7	2	6	Antonella Crispino	Italy	2:10.82	q
8	1	6	Ana Monteiro	Portugal	2:10.85	q
9	2	2	Laura Lahtinen	Finland	2:11.41	
10	2	7	Júlia Pujadas	Spain	2:12.49	
11	1	1	Mireia Belmonte	Spain	2:14.01	
12	2	1	Amina Kajtaz	Croatia	2:14.40	
13	1	2	Katinka Hosszú	Hungary	2:14.54	
14	1	7	Anastasia Tichy	Austria	2:14.59	
15	2	8	Fanny Borer	Switzerland	2:14.90	
16	1	8	Annina Grabher	Switzerland	2:16.92	

=== Final ===
The final was held on 17 August at 18:16.

Rank	Lane	Name	Nationality	Time	Notes
1st place, gold medalist(s)	2	Lana Pudar	Bosnia and Herzegovina	2:06.81	NR
2nd place, silver medalist(s)	4	Helena Rosendahl Bach	Denmark	2:07.30	NR
3rd place, bronze medalist(s)	6	Ilaria Cusinato	Italy	2:07.77	
4	3	Laura Stephens	Great Britain	2:08.47	
5	7	Zsuzsanna Jakabos	Hungary	2:09.03	
6	5	Keanna MacInnes	Great Britain	2:09.59	
7	8	Ana Monteiro	Portugal	2:10.79	
8	1	Antonella Crispino	Italy	2:10.97	
