= Swimming at the 2024 European Aquatics Championships – Women's 200 metre butterfly =

Women's 200 metre butterfly at the 2024 European Aquatics Championships
- Venue: Sports Centre Milan Gale Muškatirović
- Dates: 22 June (heats and semifinals); 23 June (final)
- Competitors: 20 from 15 nations
- Winning time: 2:07.88

Medalists
gold medal	Helena Rosendahl Bach	Denmark
silver medal	Lana Pudar	Bosnia and Herzegovina
bronze medal	Boglárka Telegdy Kapás	Hungary

The Women's 200 metre butterfly competition of the 2024 European Aquatics Championships was held on 22 and 23 June 2024.

== Records ==
Prior to the competition, the existing world, European and championship records were as follows.

	Name	Nation	Time	Location	Date
World record	Liu Zige	China	2:01.81	Jinan	21 October 2009
European record	Katinka Hosszú	Hungary	2:04.27	Rome	29 July 2009
Championship record	Mireia Belmonte	Spain	2:04.79	Berlin	24 August 2014

== Results ==
=== Heats ===
The heats were started on 22 June at 09:48.
Qualification Rules: The 16 fastest from the heats qualify to semifinals.

Rank	Heat	Lane	Name	Nationality	Time	Notes
1	2	6	Zsuzsanna Jakabos	Hungary	2:08.53	Q
2	1	4	Helena Rosendahl Bach	Denmark	2:09.39	Q
3	2	5	Boglárka Telegdy Kapás	Hungary	2:09.51	Q
4	1	5	Dalma Sebestyén	Hungary	2:10.15	
5	2	3	Dora Hathazi	Hungary	2:11.91	
6	1	6	Anja Crevar	Serbia	2:12.10	Q
7	1	3	Georgia Damasioti	Greece	2:12.64	Q
8	2	4	Lana Pudar	Bosnia and Herzegovina	2:13.00	Q
9	2	1	Laura Lahtinen	Finland	2:13.70	Q
10	1	7	Lucy Grieve	Great Britain	2:13.73	Q
11	1	1	Katja Fain	Slovenia	2:14.91	Q
12	1	2	Amina Kajtaz	Croatia	2:14.96	Q
13	2	7	Aleksandra Knop	Poland	2:14.99	Q
14	2	9	Fabienne Pavlik	Austria	2:15.37	Q
15	1	0	Aliisa Soini	Finland	2:16.10	Q
16	2	0	Iman Avdić	Bosnia and Herzegovina	2:16.14	Q
17	2	8	Hana Sekuti	Slovenia	2:16.48	Q
18	1	8	Fanny Borer	Switzerland	2:17.29	Q
19	1	9	Tea Winblad	Sweden	2:19.95	
	2	2	Lea Polonsky	Israel	Did not start	

=== Semifinals ===
The semifinals were started on 22 June at 19:46.
Qualification Rules: The 8 fastest from the heats qualify to the final.

Rank	Heat	Lane	Name	Nationality	Time	Notes
1	1	4	Helena Rosendahl Bach	Denmark	2:07.39	Q
2	2	5	Boglárka Telegdy Kapás	Hungary	2:09.35	Q
3	2	4	Zsuzsanna Jakabos	Hungary	2:09.42	Q
4	1	3	Lana Pudar	Bosnia and Herzegovina	2:10.39	Q
5	2	3	Georgia Damasioti	Greece	2:10.50	Q
6	1	5	Anja Crevar	Serbia	2:10.84	Q
7	2	6	Laura Lahtinen	Finland	2:10.91	Q
8	1	6	Lucy Grieve	Great Britain	2:12.05	Q
9	2	2	Katja Fain	Slovenia	2:14.22	
10	2	7	Aleksandra Knop	Poland	2:14.33	
11	2	8	Hana Sekuti	Slovenia	2:14.57	
12	1	8	Fanny Borer	Switzerland	2:14.70	
13	1	1	Andrea Podmaníková	Slovakia	2:14.90	
14	1	7	Fabienne Pavlik	Austria	2:15.31	
15	2	1	Aliisa Soini	Finland	2:18.08	
16	1	2	Amina Kajtaz	Croatia	2:36.21	

=== Final ===
The final was held on 23 June at 18:46.

Rank	Lane	Name	Nationality	Time	Notes
1st place, gold medalist(s)	4	Helena Rosendahl Bach	Denmark	2:07.88	
2nd place, silver medalist(s)	3	Lana Pudar	Bosnia and Herzegovina	2:08.15	
3rd place, bronze medalist(s)	6	Boglárka Telegdy Kapás	Hungary	2:08.22	
4	5	Zsuzsanna Jakabos	Hungary	2:10.26	
5	7	Georgia Damasioti	Greece	2:10.77	
6	1	Anja Crevar	Serbia	2:12.10	
7	8	Lucy Grieve	Great Britain	2:12.12	
8	2	Laura Lahtinen	Finland	2:14.03	
