= Swimming at the 2020 Summer Olympics – Women's 100 metre butterfly =

Women's 100 metre butterfly at the Games of the XXXII Olympiad
- Venue: Tokyo Aquatics Centre
- Dates: 24 July 2021 (heats); 25 July 2021 (semifinals); 26 July 2021 (final)
- Competitors: 33 from 27 nations
- Winning time: 55.59 AM

Medalists
1st place, gold medalist(s)		Maggie Mac Neil	Canada
2nd place, silver medalist(s)		Zhang Yufei	China
3rd place, bronze medalist(s)		Emma McKeon	Australia

The women's 100 metre butterfly event at the 2020 Summer Olympics was held from 24 to 26 July 2021 at the Tokyo Aquatics Centre. It was the event's seventeenth consecutive appearance, having been held at every edition since 1956.

== Summary ==
Canada's defending World champion Maggie Mac Neil pulled away from a tight field to win her nation's first Olympic title in the event. Swimming out in lane 7, Mac Neil touched seventh at the 50 m mark but used a blistering underwater off the turn to catapult herself near the front and win gold in an Americas record of 55.59. China's Zhang Yufei, who was the fastest qualifier through the heats and semi-finals, was first at the turn. However, she could not withstand MacNeil's fast finish and settled for silver 5 hundredths of a second back in 55.64.

Australia's Emma McKeon reset her Oceanian record from the heats to win bronze in 55.72, edging out the U.S.' Torri Huske (55.73) by one hundredth of a second. Huske, one of the pre-Olympics favourites, could not replicate her stunning American record of 55.66 and took fourth. Sweden's Louise Hansson set a personal best time of 56.22 to place fifth. Third at the 50 m mark, France's Marie Wattel was a shade off her national record from the semi-finals, clocking 56.27 to come sixth.

Sweden's defending champion Sarah Sjöström, coming off elbow surgery in February, produced a valiant effort to place seventh in 56.91 - her slowest time throughout the rounds. Belarus' Anastasiya Shkurdai (57.05) rounded out the championship field.

== Records ==
Prior to this competition, the existing world and Olympic records were as follows.

World record	Sarah Sjöström (SWE)	55.48	Rio de Janeiro, Brazil	7 August 2016
Olympic record	Sarah Sjöström (SWE)	55.48	Rio de Janeiro, Brazil	7 August 2016

No new records were set during the competition.

== Qualification ==
The Olympic Qualifying Time for the event is 57.92 seconds. Up to two swimmers per National Olympic Committee (NOC) can automatically qualify by swimming that time at an approved qualification event. The Olympic Selection Time is 59.66 seconds. Up to one swimmer per NOC meeting that time is eligible for selection, allocated by world ranking until the maximum quota for all swimming events is reached. NOCs without a female swimmer qualified in any event can also use their universality place.

== Competition format ==
The competition consists of three rounds: heats, semifinals, and a final. The swimmers with the best 16 times in the heats advance to the semifinals. The swimmers with the best 8 times in the semifinals advance to the final. Swim-offs are used as necessary to break ties for advancement to the next round.

== Schedule ==
All times are Japan Standard Time (UTC+9)

Date	Time	Round
24 July	19:25	Heats
25 July	10:40	Semifinals
26 July	10:30	Final

== Results ==
=== Heats ===
The swimmers with the top 16 times, regardless of heat, advanced to the semifinals.

Rank	Heat	Lane	Swimmer	Nation	Time	Notes
1	5	4	Zhang Yufei	China	55.82	Q
1	5	5	Emma McKeon	Australia	55.82	Q, OC
3	4	5	Sarah Sjöström	Sweden	56.18	Q
4	4	4	Torri Huske	United States	56.29	Q
5	3	4	Maggie Mac Neil	Canada	56.55	Q
6	5	3	Louise Hansson	Sweden	56.97	Q
7	4	3	Anastasiya Shkurdai	Belarus	56.99	Q
8	3	3	Marie Wattel	France	57.08	Q
9	4	6	Elena Di Liddo	Italy	57.41	Q
10	3	5	Claire Curzan	United States	57.49	Q
11	3	1	Katerine Savard	Canada	57.51	Q
12	4	2	Ilaria Bianchi	Italy	57.70	Q
13	5	2	Anna Ntountounaki	Greece	57.75	Q
14	3	2	Arina Surkova	ROC	58.02	Q
15	4	7	Svetlana Chimrova	ROC	58.04	Q
16	5	6	Brianna Throssell	Australia	58.08	Q
17	3	8	Maria Ugolkova	Switzerland	58.22	NR
18	4	8	Anastasia Gorbenko	Israel	58.23	
19	3	6	Lana Pudar	Bosnia and Herzegovina	58.32	
20	4	1	Farida Osman	Egypt	58.69	
21	5	1	Harriet Jones	Great Britain	58.73	
22	5	7	Emilie Beckmann	Denmark	58.84	
23	5	8	An Se-hyeon	South Korea	59.32	
24	2	5	Ellen Walshe	Ireland	59.35	
25	2	3	Remedy Rule	Philippines	59.68	
26	3	7	Erin Gallagher	South Africa	59.69	
27	2	4	Dalma Sebestyén	Hungary	59.79	
28	2	7	Luana Alonso	Paraguay	1:00.37	
29	2	2	Jeserik Pinto	Venezuela	1:00.60	
30	1	4	Mariam Sheikhalizadeh	Azerbaijan	1:01.37	
31	2	6	Miriam Sheehan	Puerto Rico	1:02.49	
32	1	5	Aniqah Gaffoor	Sri Lanka	1:05.33	
33	1	3	Yusra Mardini	Refugee Olympic Team	1:06.78	

=== Semifinals ===
The swimmers with the best 8 times, regardless of heat, advanced to the final.

Rank	Heat	Lane	Swimmer	Nation	Time	Notes
1	2	4	Zhang Yufei	China	55.89	Q
2	1	6	Marie Wattel	France	56.16	Q, NR
3	1	4	Emma McKeon	Australia	56.33	Q
4	2	5	Sarah Sjöström	Sweden	56.40	Q
5	1	5	Torri Huske	United States	56.51	Q
6	2	3	Maggie Mac Neil	Canada	56.56	Q
7	1	3	Louise Hansson	Sweden	56.92	Q
8	2	6	Anastasiya Shkurdai	Belarus	57.19	Q
9	2	1	Anna Ntountounaki	Greece	57.25	NR
10	1	2	Claire Curzan	United States	57.42	
11	2	8	Svetlana Chimrova	ROC	57.54	
12	1	8	Brianna Throssell	Australia	57.59	
13	2	2	Elena Di Liddo	Italy	57.60	
14	1	1	Arina Surkova	ROC	57.72	
15	1	7	Ilaria Bianchi	Italy	58.07	
16	2	7	Katerine Savard	Canada	58.10	

=== Final ===
Rank	Lane	Swimmer	Nation	Time	Notes
1st place, gold medalist(s)	7	Maggie Mac Neil	Canada	55.59	AM
2nd place, silver medalist(s)	4	Zhang Yufei	China	55.64	
3rd place, bronze medalist(s)	3	Emma McKeon	Australia	55.72	OC
4	2	Torri Huske	United States	55.73	
5	1	Louise Hansson	Sweden	56.22	
6	5	Marie Wattel	France	56.27	
7	6	Sarah Sjöström	Sweden	56.91	
8	8	Anastasiya Shkurdai	Belarus	57.05	
