= Charlotte Hook =

American swimmer (born 2004)

Personal information
- Nationality: American
- Born: January 29, 2004 (age 22) Cary, North Carolina
- Height: 5 ft 8 in (173 cm)

Sport
- Sport: Swimming
- Event: 200-meter Butterfly
- Strokes: Butterfly, Medley
- Club: Triangle Aquatic Center Titans (TAC)
- College team: Stanford University
- Coach: Bruce Marchionda (TAC); Greg Meehan, T. Slusser (Stanford); Chris Lindauer (Stanford)
Medal record
Women's swimming
Representing the United States
World Championships (SC)
Silver medal – second place	2021 Abu Dhabi	200 m butterfly
Swimming World Cup
Gold medal – first place	2021 Budapest	4x50 m mixed medley
Silver medal – second place	2021 Berlin	200 m butterfly
World Junior Championships
Bronze medal – third place	2019 Budapest	200 m butterfly

Charlotte Hook (born January 29, 2004, in Cary, North Carolina) is an American swimmer specializing in the butterfly, who competed for Stanford University from 2021-2026, and won a silver medal at the 2021 FINA World Championships in the 200 m butterfly in Abu Dhabi.

== Early life and family ==
Hook was born January 29, 2004, in Cary, North Carolina, one of three siblings to father Matt, a health care professional, and mother Carol Hook, and grew up in the Cary-Raleigh area. From an athletic family, her sister Abby swam for Washington University, and her father Matt had been a Captain of the light rowing team for Columbia. Hook took up swimming by the age of two as her parents wanted her to learn water safety. She joined a summer swim league by the age of five, and shortly after began swimming in a year-round program. She later played lacrosse, and tried taekwondo, but stuck with swimming as her primary sport.

Hook attended Cary Academy in Cary, North Carolina, a suburb of greater Raleigh, where she earned academic honors, and in February 2019, won the North Carolina Independent School's Division I State Title with a 54.75 in the 100 butterfly, and placed second in the 200 Individual Medley with a 2:06.17. She advanced her swimming skills and endurance swimming with the Triangle Aquatic Center Titans from 2013-2021, likely under Head Coach Bruce Marchionda and Assistant Coach Claire Donahue. The TAC team was rated first in the nation in 2021, and very high in national rankings during much of Hook's time with the team. As a swimmer for Cary Academy, Hook held records in the 100 fly and 200 IM, and captained the team in 2021-22.

At 16, Hook became the U.S. National Team's youngest member in 2020. She was disappointed in the disruption in her training caused by the corona virus but focused on her training, did dryland training, and swam in a lake. Soon returning to training, she hoped to make the 2021 Olympic trials. At the 2018 U.S. Nationals, at age 18, she won a bronze medal in the 200-meter butterfly which had already become her signature event.

== '20, '24 Olympic trials ==
At the 2021 Olympic trials in Omaha, Nebraska, Hook placed third in her specialty, the 200-meter Butterfly with a time of 2:07.92, and was not selected for the U.S. women's team, as a second place or better finish was required. In June of 2021, Hook was considered one of the top five U.S. swimmers in the 200 butterfly. Hook qualified for the 2024 Olympic trials in Indianapolis, but in the 200-meter butterfly finished with a time of 2:10.04, missing the opportunity to qualify for the U.S. team as she did not place in the top two finisher.

== Career competition highlights ==
In national competition, at the Palo Alto 2019 National Championships, Hook swam a 2:07.87 in the 200 butterfly, a personal best, winning the B-final at the National Championships, completing the event two seconds ahead of the second place finisher, and earning a sixth place National ranking among U.S. women swimmers in the event for the 2018-2019 season.

In international competition in 2021, at the Swimming World Cup in Budapest, she won a gold medal in the 4x50 meter mixed medley, and at the 2021 World Cup in Berlin, he won a silver in her specialty, the 200-meter butterfly.

=== 2021 FINA World championships ===
She competed in the women's 200 metre butterfly at the 2021 FINA World Swimming Championships (25 m) in Abu Dhabi, where she won the silver medal.

=== Stanford University ===
Hook attended and swam for Stanford University from around 2022-2026, where she was an All-American in NCAA competition three times, and placed sixth in the 200 butterfly in 2023, 13th in the 200 butterfly in 2024, and 9th in the 200 butterfly in 2026. The women's team won the PAC-12 conference championships in 2023. Majoring in Human Biology at Stanford, she swam under Coach Greg Meehan, and after April 2025 for Chris Lindaur. At the end of her time at Stanford she had the seventh fastest time in school history in the 200 butterfly with a time of 1:52.48. An able student at Stanford, in 2024, she made the Pac-12 Academic Honor Roll and in three years received All American honors from the College Swimming Coaches Association of American (ASCAA) as a Scholar.
