= Swimming at the 2018 Commonwealth Games – Women's 200 metre butterfly =

Women's 200 metre butterfly at the 2018 Commonwealth Games
- Venue: Gold Coast Aquatic Centre
- Dates: 9 April
- Competitors: 14 from 8 nations
- Winning time: 2:05.45

Medalists
gold medal	Alys Thomas	Wales
silver medal	Laura Taylor	Australia
bronze medal	Emma McKeon	Australia

The women's 200 metre butterfly event at the 2018 Commonwealth Games was held on 9 April at the Gold Coast Aquatic Centre.

== Records ==
Prior to this competition, the existing world, Commonwealth and Games records were as follows:

World record	Liu Zige (CHN)	2:01.81	Jinan, China	21 October 2009
Commonwealth record	Jessicah Schipper (AUS)	2:03.41	Rome, Italy	30 July 2009
Games record	Jessicah Schipper (AUS)	2:06.09	Melbourne, Australia	21 March 2006

The following records were established during the competition:

Date	Event	Name	Nationality	Time	Record
9 April	Final	Alys Thomas	Wales	2:05.45	GR

== Results ==
=== Heats ===
The heats were held at 11:42.

Rank	Heat	Lane	Name	Nationality	Time	Notes
1	2	3	Alys Thomas	Wales	2:07.72	Q
2	2	4	Laura Taylor	Australia	2:08.43	Q
3	2	2	Mabel Zavaros	Canada	2:08.71	Q
4	2	5	Emma McKeon	Australia	2:09.55	Q
5	1	3	Brianna Throssell	Australia	2:09.93	Q
6	1	4	Charlotte Atkinson	Isle of Man	2:09.95	Q
7	2	6	Laura Stephens	England	2:11.18	Q
8	1	5	Emily Large	England	2:11.35	Q
9	2	7	Hannah Miley	Scotland	2:11.53	
10	1	6	Keanna MacInnes	Scotland	2:11.78	
11	1	1	Dune Coetzee	South Africa	2:12.38	
12	1	2	Aimee Willmott	England	2:12.40	
13	1	7	Helena Gasson	New Zealand	2:13.25	
14	2	1	Harriet Jones	Wales	2:14.35	
	2	8	Alania Suttie	Samoa	DNS	

=== Final ===
The final was held at 21:28.

Rank	Lane	Name	Nationality	Time	Notes
1st place, gold medalist(s)	4	Alys Thomas	Wales	2:05.45	GR
2nd place, silver medalist(s)	5	Laura Taylor	Australia	2:07.39	
3rd place, bronze medalist(s)	6	Emma McKeon	Australia	2:08.05	
4	7	Charlotte Atkinson	Isle of Man	2:08.50	
5	2	Brianna Throssell	Australia	2:08.82	
6	3	Mabel Zavaros	Canada	2:09.20	
7	8	Emily Large	England	2:10.96	
8	1	Laura Stephens	England	2:11.46	
