= Gretchen Walsh =

American swimmer (born 2003)

Personal information
- National team: United States
- Born: January 29, 2003 (age 23) Nashville, Tennessee, U.S.
- Height: 6 ft 2 in (1.88 m)

Sport
- Sport: Swimming
- Strokes: Freestyle, backstroke, butterfly
- Club: Nashville Aquatic Club
- College team: University of Virginia
Medal record
Women's swimming
Representing United States
Event	1st	2nd	3rd
Olympic Games	2	2	0
World Championships (LC)	4	1	1
World Championships (SC)	7	0	0
World Junior Championships	6	0	0
Pan Pacific Championships	5	2	0
Junior Pan Pac Championships	5	1	0
Total	29	6	1
Olympic Games Olympic Games
Gold medal – first place	2024 Paris	4×100 m medley
Gold medal – first place	2024 Paris	4×100 m mixed medley
Silver medal – second place	2024 Paris	100 m butterfly
Silver medal – second place	2024 Paris	4×100 m freestyle
World Championships (LC)
Gold medal – first place	2023 Fukuoka	4×100 m medley
Gold medal – first place	2025 Singapore	50 m butterfly
Gold medal – first place	2025 Singapore	100 m butterfly
Gold medal – first place	2025 Singapore	4×100 m medley
Silver medal – second place	2023 Fukuoka	4×100 m freestyle
Bronze medal – third place	2023 Fukuoka	50 m butterfly
World Championships (SC)
Gold medal – first place	2024 Budapest	50 m freestyle
Gold medal – first place	2024 Budapest	100 m freestyle
Gold medal – first place	2024 Budapest	50 m butterfly
Gold medal – first place	2024 Budapest	100 m butterfly
Gold medal – first place	2024 Budapest	100 m medley
Gold medal – first place	2024 Budapest	4×100 m freestyle
Gold medal – first place	2024 Budapest	4×100 m medley
Pan Pacific Championships
Gold medal – first place	2026 Irvine	50 m butterfly
Gold medal – first place	2026 Irvine	100 m butterfly
Gold medal – first place	2026 Irvine	4×100 m freestyle
Gold medal – first place	2026 Irvine	4×100 m medley
Gold medal – first place	2026 Irvine	4×100 m mixed medley
Silver medal – second place	2026 Irvine	50 m freestyle
Silver medal – second place	2026 Irvine	100 m freestyle
World Junior Championships
Gold medal – first place	2019 Budapest	50 m freestyle
Gold medal – first place	2019 Budapest	100 m freestyle
Gold medal – first place	2019 Budapest	4×100 m medley
Gold medal – first place	2019 Budapest	4×100 m mixed medley
Gold medal – first place	2019 Budapest	4×100 m freestyle
Gold medal – first place	2019 Budapest	4×100 m mixed freestyle
Junior Pan Pac Championships
Gold medal – first place	2018 Suva	100 m freestyle
Gold medal – first place	2018 Suva	4×100 m medley
Gold medal – first place	2018 Suva	4×100 m mixed medley
Gold medal – first place	2018 Suva	4×100 m freestyle
Gold medal – first place	2018 Suva	4×200 m freestyle
Silver medal – second place	2018 Suva	50 m freestyle

Gretchen Claire Walsh (born January 29, 2003) is an American competitive swimmer and the world record holder in the 100 meter butterfly (long course), 50 meter freestyle (long course and short course), 50 meter butterfly (short course), 100 meter butterfly (short course), and 100 meter individual medley (short course). She won the silver medal in the 100 meter butterfly at the 2024 Summer Olympics in Paris, where she also set the Olympic record in the 100 meter butterfly in the semifinals with a time of 55.38. She additionally holds one world junior record in the mixed gender 4×100 medley relay event, as well as American records in the 50 meter butterfly, 4×100 meter freestyle relay, 4×100 meter medley relay, 50 meter freestyle (short course), 50 meter backstroke (short course), 50 yard freestyle, 100 yard freestyle, 100 yard butterfly, 100 yard backstroke, 4×50 yard freestyle relay, 4×50 yard medley relay, 4×100 yard freestyle relay, and 4×100 yard medley relay.

Walsh competed collegiately for the University of Virginia. In 2022, she became the fastest female freshman to swim the 50 yard freestyle in the NCAA, with a time of 20.95 seconds, and earned the NCAA title in the 100 yard freestyle, with a time of 46.05 seconds, and the national title in the 100 meter butterfly. In 2023, she won the women's NCAA Division I title in the 100 yard backstroke, with an American record time of 48.26 seconds, and the 100 yard freestyle, with a 45.61. In 2024, she won NCAA titles in the 50 yard freestyle, 100 yard freestyle, and 100 yard butterfly, setting NCAA records in all three events with times of 20.37 seconds, 44.83 seconds, and 47.42 seconds, respectively. She repeated these championships in 2025 with times of 20.49 seconds, 44.71 seconds and 46.97 seconds.

== Early life and education ==
Walsh was born January 29, 2003, to mother Glynis Walsh and father Robert Walsh. She has an older sister, Alex, who is also a competitive swimmer. She attended Harpeth Hall School in Nashville, Tennessee, where she competed scholastically for the high school team, setting national high school records in the 50 yard freestyle and the 100 yard freestyle and winning state championships titles in multiple events.

In the autumn of 2021, Walsh started attending the University of Virginia, where she competes collegiately as part of the Virginia Cavaliers swimming and diving team.

== Career ==
=== 2015–2017: Early career & age-group success ===
In 2015, Walsh caught the attention of SwimSwam after achieving her first spot at a national competition for juniors when she was 12 years old. She became the youngest swimmer to qualify for the 2016 US Olympic Trials in 2016. In addition to being the youngest qualifier, at just 13 years of age, she was also the youngest swimmer to compete at the Olympic Trials, where she was 13 years, 4 months, and 13 days old at the time of competition. In the one event she qualified to compete in, the 50 meter freestyle, Walsh finished with a time of 26.55 seconds and placed 125th overall.

In December 2017, Walsh broke her own National Age Group record in the 50 yard freestyle for the girls 13–14 age group with a time of 22.00 seconds in the final of the event at the Speedo Junior Nationals East Championships in Knoxville. Four months later, in March 2018 and when she was 15 years old, Walsh became the youngest female American swimmer to swim the 50 yard freestyle race in less than 22.00 seconds with a time of 21.85 seconds that also broke the former National Age Group records in the event for the girls 15–16 age group set by both Simone Manuel and Kate Douglass at 22.04 on different dates.

=== 2018-2020: International breakout ===
In 2018, Walsh qualified for the 2018 Junior Pan Pacific Swimming Championships in Suva, Fiji in four individual events, and was selected to swim on four relays as a result. This marked her first time representing the United States internationally.

==== 2018 Junior Pan Pacific Championships ====
In Fiji, Walsh won the gold medal and broke the Championships record in the 100 meter freestyle on the first night of competition with a time of 54.47 seconds, which lowered the previous Championships record of 54.60 seconds set by Simone Manuel in 2012 by over one tenth of a second. In addition to this first gold medal, Walsh won gold medals in the 4×100 meter medley relay, 4×100 meter mixed medley relay, 4×100 meter freestyle relay, and the 4×200 meter freestyle relay, a silver medal in the 50 meter freestyle, and placed 12th in the 200 meter freestyle and 16th in the 100 meter butterfly.

==== 2019 ====
Competing as part of the Nashville Aquatic Club at the 2019 Speedo Southern Premier Meet in Knoxville, Walsh broke the girls 15–16 age group National Age Group record of 47.73 seconds in the 100 yard freestyle set in 2013 by Simone Manuel with a time of 47.49 seconds. In May 2019 SwimSwam ranked Walsh as the number one NCAA recruit from all swimmers across the United States in the high school graduating class of 2021.

==== 2019 World Junior Championships ====
2019 World Junior Championships
Gold medal – first place	4×100 m mixed medley	3:44.84 (WJ, CR)
Gold medal – first place	100 m freestyle	53.74
Gold medal – first place	4×100 m mixed freestyle	3:25.92 (WJ, CR)
Gold medal – first place	4×100 m freestyle	3:37.61
Gold medal – first place	50 m freestyle	24.71
Gold medal – first place	4×100 m medley	3:59.13

Ahead of the start of competition at the 2019 World Junior Championships held at Danube Arena in Budapest, Hungary in August, Walsh was named as one of the five captains for the United States contingent of swimmers at the Championships by USA Swimming. On the second day of competition, August 21, Walsh won her first medal, a gold medal in the 4×100 meter mixed medley relay, swimming the freestyle leg of the relay in 53.60 seconds and helping the relay set new world junior and Championships records in the event with a time of 3:44.84. The next day she won her first individual medal of the competition, a gold medal in the 100 meter freestyle with a time of 53.74 seconds. She won her third gold medal later the same day, this time swimming the fourth leg of the 4×100 meter mixed freestyle relay in a time of 53.83 seconds to contribute to the relay's winning time of 3:25.92, which was also a new world junior record and Championships record for the event. Two days later, on August 24, Walsh won a gold medal in the 4×100 meter freestyle relay, splitting a time of 54.13 seconds for the lead-off leg of the relay to help the relay achieve the winning mark of 3:37.61. On August 25, the final day of competition, Walsh brought her total medal count to six gold medals by winning a gold medal in the 50 meter freestyle in a time of 24.71 seconds as well as winning a gold medal in the 4×100 meter medley relay with a finals relay time of 3:59.13.

==== 2020 ====
In January, Walsh announced her verbal commitment to compete collegiately for the University of Virginia Cavaliers starting in the autumn of 2021. On February 7, Walsh set a new overall National High School record in the 50 yard freestyle in 21.59 seconds, which broke the former record of 21.64 seconds set in 2015 by Abbey Weitzeil. The next day, Walsh became the fastest female swimmer in American high school swimming history in the 100 yard freestyle with a time of 46.98 seconds, breaking the former overall National High School record in the event set in 2015 by Abbey Weitzeil at 47.09 seconds. Later that year, in November at the 2020 U.S. Open Swimming Championships, she won the gold medal in the 50 meter freestyle with a time of 24.65 seconds and the silver medal in the 100 meter freestyle with a 54.37.

==== 2020 US Olympic Trials ====
At the 2020 US Olympic Trials in Omaha, Nebraska, which were postponed to 2021 due to the COVID-19 pandemic, Walsh started competing on the first day of the second wave of the competition, swimming a time of 27.02 seconds in the 50 meter butterfly en route to her final mark of 58.58 in the prelims heats of the 100 meter butterfly, which ranked her eighth heading into the semifinals. In the semifinals of the 100 meter butterfly, Walsh swam a time of 58.46 seconds, ranked twelfth overall, and did not advance to the final of the event. For her second event of the trials, the 100 meter freestyle, Walsh placed 28th in the prelims heats with a time of 55.91 seconds. In her third and final event of the 2020 Olympic Trials, Walsh swam a personal best time of 24.64 seconds in the semifinals stage of competition of the 50 meter freestyle, which ranked her sixth overall ahead of the final. Walsh swam a 24.74 in the final of the event, placing fifth overall, and narrowly missed the 2020 US Olympic Team.

=== 2021–2022: First collegiate season ===
In one of the first dual meets of her collegiate career, Walsh helped the Virginia Cavaliers, defeat the California Golden Bears, winning four individual events, including the 100 yard backstroke in 51.15 seconds, and swimming on two relays. Her performances contributed to collegiate swimming being ranked number one for "The Week That Was" honor from Swimming World for the week of October 18, 2021. Walsh was also named as the "Women's Swimmer of the Week" by the Atlantic Coast Conference, ACC, for the week of October 19, 2021. Later in the month, at a dual meet between her school and Army, Walsh won the 200 yard freestyle. In January 2022, Walsh split a 23.04 for the lead-off leg of the 4×50 medley relay in a dual meet against North Carolina State University, becoming the fastest female American swimmer in the 50 yard backstroke.

==== 2022 ACC Championships ====
In her first race of the 2022 Atlantic Coast Conference, ACC, Championships in February 2022, Walsh tied Kate Douglass for a new ACC record in the 50 yard freestyle with a 21.25 in the prelims heats. With her time of 21.25 seconds, Walsh also became the fastest female freshman swimmer in the history of the NCAA in the 50 yard freestyle, edging out former fastest female freshman, Simone Manuel in 2015, by 0.07 seconds. In the final of the 4×50 yard freestyle relay in the evening, she split a 20.58 on the fourth leg to help achieve a first-place finish in an American record time of 1:24.47. Walsh swam a 21.04 in the final of the 50 yard freestyle to become the fourth-fastest woman ever to swim the event in the NCAA, behind Abbey Weitzeil, Kate Douglass, and Erika Brown, and placed second. On day three, Walsh helped set another American record, this time in the 4×50 medley relay, with a new record time of 1:31.81 to win the event. Her split time of 22.82 for the backstroke leg of the relay was the fastest 50 yard backstroke time by a female swimmer in the NCAA. The following morning, she ranked third in the prelims heats of the 100 yard backstroke in 51.53, qualifying for the final. In the evening, she placed second with a time of 50.13 seconds, which was 0.72 seconds behind first-place finisher Katharine Berkoff. She followed up her individual performance with a split of 49.71 on the backstroke leg of the 4×100 yard medley relay, helping set new American and US Open records in the event at 3:22.34. Her time of 49.71 seconds was a personal best time and moved her up in rankings to sixth-fastest female swimmer in the event.

Starting off her competition on the fifth and final day, Walsh qualified for the final of the 100 yard freestyle with a time of 47.07 seconds, which ranked her second overall in the prelims heats. In the final, she swam a personal best time of 46.86 seconds to take second place. Finishing off the meet, she anchored the 4×100 yard freestyle relay with a 46.35, helping win in an ACC record time of 3:08.22.

==== 2022 NCAA Championships ====
2022 NCAA Championships
Gold medal – first place	4×50 yd medley	1:32.16 (CR)
Gold medal – first place	4×50 yd freestyle	1:24.96
Gold medal – first place	4×100 yd medley	3:22.34 (NR, CR)
Gold medal – first place	100 yd freestyle	46.05
Gold medal – first place	4×100 yd freestyle	3:06.91 (NR, CR)
Silver medal – second place	50 yd freestyle	20.95
Silver medal – second place	100 yd backstroke	49.00

On day one of the 2022 NCAA Division I Championships in March, Walsh helped achieve a win in the 4×50 yard medley relay in a Championships record time of 1:32.16, splitting a 22.81 for the backstroke leg of the relay. In the morning prelims heats on day two, she ranked second in the 50 yard freestyle with a time of 21.09 seconds and qualified for the final. She swam a personal best time of 20.95 seconds in the final, placing second. Later in the same finals session, she helped achieve a first-place victory in the 4×50 yard freestyle relay, splitting a 20.58 for the anchor leg of the relay. The third morning, she qualified for the final of the 100 yard backstroke tied in rank for second with a time of 49.93 seconds. In the evening, she placed second in the 100 yard backstroke with a personal best time of 49.00 seconds, finishing 0.26 seconds behind first-place finisher Katharine Berkoff. For the 4×100 yard medley relay in the same session, she helped the team win in a time of 3:22.34, which tied the American and US Open records in the event, splitting a 49.44 for backstroke leg of the relay.

On the fourth and final day, Walsh ranked first in the prelims heats of the 100 yard freestyle, qualifying for the final with a time of 46.78 seconds. In the final, she won the NCAA title in the event, set a new pool record, and ranked as the fourth-fastest all-time in the 100 yard freestyle with a new personal best time of 46.05 seconds. She concluded her first NCAA Championships with another win, this time helping set new American and US Open records in the 4×100 yard freestyle relay in 3:06.91, splitting a 26.01 for the anchor leg of the relay.

==== 2022 International Team Trials ====
Walsh ranked 22nd in the preliminary heats of the 100 meter freestyle on day one of the 2022 US International Team Trials in Greensboro, North Carolina, in April, not advancing to the final with her time of 55.57 seconds. The following day, she tied for fourth-rank in the prelims heats of the 50 meter butterfly with a personal best time of 25.98 seconds, advancing to the evening final. She placed fourth in the final with a personal best time of 25.97 seconds. On day three, she qualified for the final of the 50 meter backstroke ranking eighth in the prelims heats with a personal best time of 28.26 seconds. She placed fifth in the final, lowering her personal best time to a 27.78. Day four, she ranked 15th in the prelims heats of the 100 meter backstroke, qualifying for the b-final with a 1:01.25. She decided not to compete in the event in the B-final. In her final event, the 50 meter freestyle on the fifth and final day, she ranked sixth in the prelims heats with a 24.88 and qualified for the final. She placed third in the final with a personal best time of 24.53 seconds, just 0.03 seconds behind the first-place finisher. Three months later, she lowered her personal best time in the 50 meter freestyle again, this time to a 24.47, at the 2022 US National Championships and took second place. Two days before her 50 meter freestyle personal best time, she won the national title in the 100 meter butterfly with a time of 57.44 seconds.

=== 2022–2023: Second collegiate season ===
At the 2022 Tennessee Invitational in Knoxville in November, Walsh won the 50 yard freestyle with a personal best time of 20.94 seconds. She also achieved a personal best time of 49.89 seconds in the 100 yard butterfly in the preliminaries in the event. In early February 2023, she achieved a second-place finish in the 200 yard freestyle at the season's Cavalier Invitational with a personal best time of 1:43.24, which was 0.46 seconds behind first-place finisher and teammate Aimee Canny.

==== 2023 ACC Championships ====
On the first night of the 2023 Atlantic Coast Conference Championships in Greensboro, North Carolina, Walsh led off with a personal best time of 22.65 seconds for the backstroke portion of the 4×50 yard medley relay to help win the conference title in an American, US Open, and NCAA record time of 1:31.73. In her first final of the evening session the following day, she split a 20.48 for the second leg of the 4×50 yard freestyle relay, helping set new American, US Open, and NCAA records with a time of 1:23.87. Later in the session, she set new American, US Open, and NCAA records in the 50 yard freestyle with a time of 20.83 seconds, lowering the former marks by 0.01 seconds from the 20.84 set by Kate Douglass in 2022 and winning the conference title. It marked her first American record in an individual event. It was also her first conference title in an individual event. She would go on to lower this record shortly after.

On the third evening, Walsh finished in a personal best time of 49.34 seconds in the final of the 100 yard butterfly to place second, 0.50 seconds behind first-place finisher Kate Douglass who set a new American record in the event. In the final of the 4×100 yard medley relay the following day, she contributed to winning the conference title with a 3:21.80, swimming the backstroke leg in 49.25 and helping set new US Open and NCAA records in the event. The fifth and final evening, she placed second in the final of the 100 yard freestyle with a time of 46.32 seconds. She concluded the Championships with a 46.41 on the lead-off leg of the 4×100 yard freestyle relay to help win the event and lower the US Open, American, and NCAA records in the event with a final time of 3:06.83.

==== 2023 NCAA Championships ====
2023 NCAA Championships
Gold medal – first place	4×50 yd medley	1:31.51 (NR, CR)
Gold medal – first place	4×50 yd freestyle	1:24.51 (CR)
Gold medal – first place	100 yd backstroke	48.26 (NR, CR)
Gold medal – first place	4×100 yd medley	3:22.39
Gold medal – first place	100 yd freestyle	45.61
Gold medal – first place	4×100 yd freestyle	3:05.84 (NR, CR)
Silver medal – second place	50 yd freestyle	20.85

Commencing competition at the 2023 NCAA Division I Championships with the 4×50 yard medley relay, Walsh and her relay teammates won the NCAA title with American, US Open, and NCAA records of 1:31.51. On the second evening, she first won the silver medal in the 50 yard freestyle with a time of 20.85 seconds, then won a gold medal and NCAA title in the 4×50 yard freestyle relay, where she helped set a new Championships record of 1:24.51 by splitting a 20.59 for the second leg of the relay. In her first event of the third evening, she won her first 100 yard backstroke NCAA title with an American, US Open, and NCAA record time of 48.26 seconds, which was a time drop of 0.74 seconds from her previous personal best time. She followed up with an NCAA title in the 4×100 yard medley relay, swimming the backstroke leg of the relay to contribute to a finish in 3:22.39.

On the fourth of four evenings, Walsh won the NCAA title for a second year in a row in the 100 yard freestyle, finishing in a pool record and personal best time of 45.61 seconds, which was 0.05 seconds slower than the American record of 45.56 seconds set by Simone Manuel in 2017. She attained a sub-46 second time (45.85) on the anchor leg of the 4×100 yard freestyle relay to conclude the meet with another NCAA title in an American, US Open, and NCAA record time of 3:05.84 with relay teammates Kate Douglass, her elder sister, Alex Walsh, and Maxine Parker.

=== 2023-2024: Third collegiate season ===
Walsh lowered her American record and tied the U.S. Open and NCAA records in the women's 50 freestyle during the first day of the Tennessee Invitational. At 20.79 seconds, the time tied the NCAA/U.S. Open record set by Maggie MacNeil.

==== 2024 NCAA Championships ====
2024 NCAA Championships
Gold medal – first place	4×50 yd medley	1:31.58
Gold medal – first place	50 yd freestyle	20.37 (NR, CR)
Gold medal – first place	4×50 yd freestyle	1:24.05
Gold medal – first place	100 yd butterfly	47.42 (NR, CR)
Gold medal – first place	4×100 yd medley	3:21.01 (NR, CR)
Gold medal – first place	100 yd freestyle	44.83 (NR, CR)
Gold medal – first place	4×100 yd freestyle	3:05.89

At the 2024 NCAA Championships, Walsh swept all seven of her events, contributing strongly to the Virginia Cavaliers' victory, their fourth consecutive one. On the first day, Walsh split a 22.10 on her 50 yard backstroke leg en route to a pool record of 1:31.58 in the 4×50yd medley relay, coming just 0.07 seconds away from the NCAA & American records previously set by Virginia at the 2023 NCAA Championships. This split marked the fastest ever 50 yard backstroke split by a woman.

On the second day, Walsh twice lowered her NCAA and American records in the 50 yard freestyle, swimming a 20.41 in the preliminary heats before blasting a 20.37 in the finals to take first. This marked her first NCAA win in the 50 yard freestyle after two consecutive years placing 2nd. She additionally split a 20.23 on the second leg of the 4×50yd freestyle relay, culminating in Virginia winning with a time of 1:24.05, marking a meet and pool record.

On the third day, Walsh won the 100 yard butterfly in a 47.42, marking the first time any woman broke 48 seconds in the event. With the next fastest performer, Kate Douglass, holding a personal best time of 48.46, Walsh's performance was a full second faster than any other woman had ever swam. She then swam a 48.26 in the 100 yard backstroke to open Virginia's 4×100yd medley relay, which won in a 3:21.01, breaking the NCAA and American records.

On the meet's last day, Walsh won the 100 yard freestyle in a 44.83, marking the first time any woman broke 45 seconds in the event. She concluded her meet by splitting a 45.17 on the third leg of Virginia's 4×100yd free relay, marking the fastest recorded split in that relay's history. Virginia ultimately won the event in a 3:05.89, just 0.05 seconds from their own NCAA record. Walsh concluded the meet with a perfect 7-for-7 first places, including three individual NCAA records, one relay NCAA record, and pool records in all seven events.

==== 2024 U.S. Olympic Trials ====
At the 2024 United States Olympic trials in June, Walsh set a new world record in the long course 100-metre butterfly with a time of 55.18, breaking the former record of 55.48 set by Sarah Sjöström at the 2016 Summer Olympics. While Walsh had held multiple American & NCAA records up to this point in short course yards, this performance marked her first ever American or world record in long course meters.

==== 2024 Paris Olympics ====
At the 2024 Summer Olympics, Walsh finished with four medals, two gold and two silver. She won gold in the 4 × 100 m medley relay, helping set a world record of 3:49.63 by swimming the Butterfly in a split of 55.03, and in the 4×100m mixed medley relay, where the team also set a world record (3:37.43) with Walsh swimming the butterfly in a split of 55.18. In the 4×100m freestyle relay, the team took silver with a time of 3:30.20, with Walsh swimming the second leg at a split of 52.55. She also took silver in the 100m butterfly, finishing in a time of 55.63, just behind her teammate Torri Huske. She also made the final of the 50m freestyle, finishing 4th in a time of 24.21, and of the 100m freestyle, where she finished 8th with a time of 53.04.

==== 2025 ====
On May 2, 2025, during the Pro Swim Series, Walsh broke the American record in the 50-meter butterfly that she herself had set, setting a new American record (and a new Pro Swim Series record) of 24.93 seconds. The next day, also during the Pro Swim Series, she broke her own world record in the 100-meter butterfly twice, first setting a new record of 55.09 seconds, then setting a new record of 54.60 seconds. In July 2025, Walsh was named the Collegiate Woman Athlete of the Year, receiving the Honda Cup in recognition of her record-breaking NCAA performances and contributions to collegiate swimming.

== Business ==
Gretchen and her sister Alex were the first NCAA athletes (and set of siblings) to launch an apparel line with a major retailer after the passage of the NIL. In September 2022, they released a collaboration with Sporti by Swimoutlet.com and created their swimsuit line, called Sporti x Alex + Gretchen Walsh.

== International championships ==
Meet	50 free	100 free	200 free	50 fly	100 fly	4×100 free	4×200 free	4×100 medley	4×100 mixed free	4×100 mixed medley
PACJ 2018 (age: 15)	(silver) (25.27)	(gold) (54.47 CR)	4th (b) (2:01.99)		16th (h) (1:02.27)	(gold) (3:40.10)	(gold) (7:57.93 CR)	(gold) (4:02.33 CR)	—N/a	(gold) (3:47.01 CR)
WJC 2019 (age: 16)	(gold) (24.71)	(gold) (53.74)				(gold) (3:37.61)		(gold) (3:59.13)	(gold) (3:25.92 WJ, CR)	(gold) (3:44.84 WJ, CR)
WC 2023 (age: 20)	11th (sf) (24.71)			(bronze) (25.46)	8th (57.58)	(silver) (3:31.93)		(gold) (3:52.08)		
2024 Summer Olympics	4th (24.21)	8th (53.04)			(silver) (55.63)	(silver) (3:30.20)		(gold) (3:49.63 WR)		(gold) (3:37.43 WR)

Legend: WR – World record; e – equalled existing record; WJ – World Junior record; CR – Championship record;
Records not set in finals: h – heat; sf – semifinal; r – relay 1st leg; rh – relay heat 1st leg; b – B final; † – en route to final mark; so – swim-off; tt – time trial

== Personal best times ==
=== Long course meters (50 m pool) ===
Event	Time		Meet	Location	Date	Notes	Ref
50 m freestyle	23.55		Sette Colli Trophy	Rome, Italy	June 28, 2026		
100 m freestyle	52.57	sf	2025 TYR Pro Swim Series	Fort Lauderdale, Florida	May 1, 2025		
50 m backstroke	27.54		2023 U.S. National Championships	Indianapolis, Indiana	June 29, 2023		
100 m backstroke	59.80	h	2022 U.S. National Championships	Irvine, California	July 29, 2022		
50 m butterfly	24.51		Sette Colli Trophy	Rome, Italy	June 26, 2026	AM	
100 m butterfly	54.33		Fort Lauderdale Open	Fort Lauderdale, Florida	May 2, 2026	WR, US	

Legend: WR – World record; AM – Americas record; e – equalled existing record; US – U.S. Open record;
Records not set in finals: h – heat; sf – semifinal; r – relay 1st leg; rh – relay heat 1st leg; b – B final; † – en route to final mark; so – swim-off; tt – time trial

=== Short course yards (25 yd pool) ===
Event	Time		Meet	Location	Date	Notes	Ref
50 yd freestyle	20.37		2024 NCAA Championships	Athens, Georgia	March 21, 2024	NR, US	
100 yd freestyle	44.71		2025 NCAA Championships	Federal Way, Washington	March 22, 2025	NR, US	
200 yd freestyle	1:39.34	r	2025 ACC Championships	Greensboro, North Carolina	February 18, 2025		
50 yd backstroke	22.10	r	2024 NCAA Championships	Athens, Georgia	March 20, 2024	NR, US	
100 yd backstroke	48.10		2024 ACC Championships	Greensboro, North Carolina	February 23, 2024	NR, US	
100 yd butterfly	46.97		2025 NCAA Championships	Federal Way, Washington	March 21, 2025	NR, US	

Legend: e – equalled existing record; NR – American record; US – U.S. Open record;
Records not set in finals: h – heat; sf – semifinal; r – relay 1st leg; rh – relay heat 1st leg; b – B final; † – en route to final mark; so – swim-off; tt – time trial

== World records ==
=== World records ===
==== Long course meters (50 m pool) ====
No.	Event	Time	Meet	Location	Date	Status	Age	Ref
1	50 m freestyle	23.55	Sette Colli Trophy	Rome, Italy	June 28, 2026	Former	23	
2	100 m butterfly	54.33	Fort Lauderdale Open	Fort Lauderdale, Florida	May 2, 2026	Current	23	
3	400 m medley relay	3:49.63	2024 Summer Olympics	Paris, France	August 4, 2024	Current	21	
4	400 m mixed medley relay	3:37.43	2024 Summer Olympics	Paris, France	August 3, 2024	Current	21	

==== Short course meters (25 m pool) ====
No.	Event	Time	Meet	Location	Date	Status	Age	Ref
1	50 m butterfly	23.94	2024 World Aquatics Championships (25m)	Budapest, Hungary	December 11, 2024	Current	21	
2	400 m freestyle relay	3:25.01	2024 World Aquatics Championships (25m)	Budapest, Hungary	December 11, 2024	Current	21	
3	100 m individual medley	55.11	2024 World Aquatics Championships (25m)	Budapest, Hungary	December 13, 2024	Current	21	
4	100 m butterfly	52.71	2024 World Aquatics Championships (25m)	Budapest, Hungary	December 14, 2024	Current	21	
5	50 m freestyle	22.83	2024 World Aquatics Championships (25m)	Budapest, Hungary	December 15, 2024	Current	21	
6	400 m medley relay	3:40.41	2024 World Aquatics Championships (25m)	Budapest, Hungary	December 15, 2024	Current	21	

=== World junior records ===
==== Long course meters (50 m pool) ====
No.	Event	Time	Meet	Location	Date	Status	Age	Ref
1	4×100 m mixed medley relay	3:44.84	2019 World Junior Championships	Budapest, Hungary	August 21, 2019	Current	16	
2	4×100 m mixed freestyle relay	3:25.92	2019 World Junior Championships	Budapest, Hungary	August 22, 2019	Former	16	

== National records ==
=== Short course yards (25 yd pool) ===
No.	Event	Time		Meet	Location	Date	Type	Status	Ref
1	4×50 yd freestyle relay	1:24.47		2022 Atlantic Coast Conference Championships	Atlanta, Georgia	February 16, 2022	NR, US	Former	
2	4×50 yd medley relay	1:31.81		2022 Atlantic Coast Conference Championships	Atlanta, Georgia	February 17, 2022	NR, US	Former	
3	4×100 yd medley relay	3:22.34		2022 Atlantic Coast Conference Championships	Atlanta, Georgia	February 18, 2022	NR, US	Current NR	
4	4×100 yd medley relay (2)	3:22.34	=	2022 NCAA Championships	Atlanta, Georgia	March 18, 2022	NR, US	Current NR	
5	4×100 yd freestyle relay	3:06.91		2022 NCAA Championships	Atlanta, Georgia	March 19, 2022	NR, US	Former	
6	4×50 yd medley relay (2)	1:31.73		2023 Atlantic Coast Conference Championships	Greensboro, North Carolina	February 14, 2023	NR, US	Former	
7	4×50 yd freestyle relay (2)	1:23.87		2023 Atlantic Coast Conference Championships	Greensboro, North Carolina	February 15, 2023	NR, US	Current	
8	50 yd freestyle	20.83		2023 Atlantic Coast Conference Championships	Greensboro, North Carolina	February 15, 2023	NR, US	Current NR	
9	4×100 yd medley relay (3)	3:21.80		2023 Atlantic Coast Conference Championships	Greensboro, North Carolina	February 17, 2023	US	Current	
10	4×100 yd freestyle relay (2)	3:06.83		2023 Atlantic Coast Conference Championships	Greensboro, North Carolina	February 18, 2023	NR,US	Former	
11	4×50 yd medley relay (3)	1:31.51		2023 NCAA Championships	Knoxville, Tennessee	March 15, 2023	NR, US	Current	
12	100 yd backstroke	48.26		2023 NCAA Championships	Knoxville, Tennessee	March 17, 2023	NR, US	Current	
13	4×100 yd freestyle relay (3)	3:05.84		2023 NCAA Championships	Knoxville, Tennessee	March 18, 2023	NR, US	Current	

Legend: NR – American record; US – US Open record

== Awards and honors ==
- SwimSwam, Weekly Wonders of Age Group Swimming: August 5, 2015
- Swimming World, Up & Comers: September 6, 2016
- USA Swimming, Team USA Captain: 2019 World Junior Championships
- National Interscholastic Swimming Coaches Association (NISCA), All-American High School Swimmer: 2020–2021
- Swimming World Magazine, Cover Issue: Special Double Issue (May/June 2020, Vol. 61, No. 6)
- SwimSwam, Swammy Award, NCAA Freshman of the Year (Women's): 2022
- Arena, Swim of the Week: January 28, 2022
- Atlantic Coast Conference (ACC), Swimmer of the Week (female): October 19, 2021, January 25, 2022, October 25, 2022, November 8, 2022, January 24, 2023
- Atlantic Coast Conference (ACC), Freshman of the Year (Women's): 2021–2022
- Swimming World, The Week That Was: October 18, 2021 (#1)
- Honda Sports Award, finalist: 2022–2023, Winner: 2025
- StyleBlueprint, Top 10 Most Popular Articles in Nashville for 2022 for an article covering the launch of her and her sister's clothing line.
- Golden Goggle Awards, Breakout Performer of the Year: 2024
- Golden Goggle Awards, Relay Performance of the Year: 2024, 2025
- 2024 World Aquatics Swimming Championships (25 m), Best female swimmer award
- Guinness World Record for most swimming world records at a single meet by an individual: 2024

== See also ==
- List of junior world records in swimming
- List of people from Tennessee
- List of people from Nashville, Tennessee

Records
Preceded by (Sweden) Sarah Sjöström	Women's 100-metre butterfly world record-holder (long course); 15 June 2024 –	Succeeded by Incumbent
Preceded by (United States) Kate Douglass	Women's 50-metre freestyle world record-holder (long course); 28 June 2026 – 15 August 2026	Succeeded by (United States) Kate Douglass
Preceded by (United States) Regan Smith; Lilly King; Kelsi Dahlia; Simone Manuel	Women's 4 × 100-metre medley relay world record-holder (long course); 4 August 2024 –	Succeeded by Incumbent
