= Laura Taylor (swimmer) =

Australian swimmer (born 1999)

Personal information
- Nationality: Australian
- Born: 10 September 1999 (age 26) South Brisbane, Queensland, Australia

Sport
- Country: Australia
- Sport: Swimming
- Club: TSS Aquatic
- Coached by: Chris Nesbit
Medal record
World Championships (SC)
Gold medal – first place	2022 Melbourne	4×200 m freestyle
Commonwealth Games
Silver medal – second place	2018 Gold Coast	200 metre butterfly
Junior Pan Pacific Championships
Silver medal – second place	2016 Maui	200 m butterfly
Silver medal – second place	2016 Maui	4×200 m freestyle

Laura Taylor (born 10 September 1999) is an Australian swimmer.

Taylor competed at the 2018 Commonwealth Games where she won a silver medal in the 200 metre butterfly event.

She wants to be a physiotherapist or do something in the medical field. She also placed 5th for Women's 200m Butterfly and 12th for Women's 100m Butterfly, both at the Pan Pacific Swimming Championships in Tokyo, Japan 2018.
