= StyleBlueprint =

Digital Media and Lifestyle Company

- Company type: Private
- Industry: Internet commerce and media
- Founded: 2009
- Founder: Elizabeth Fox; Liza Graves
- Headquarters: Nashville, Tennessee
- Key people: Liza Graves (CEO)
- Services: Lifestyle publication
- Website: styleblueprint.com

StyleBlueprint is a Nashville-based digital media company and lifestyle brand targeted to women showcasing travel, interiors, interviews, recipes, and events from around the South. Health topics, non-profit spotlights, entrepreneur and business highlights, and fashion are also covered. The company was founded by Elizabeth Fox and Liza Graves in 2009. As of January 1, 2019, the company is solely owned by Liza Graves.

StyleBlueprint began as a lifestyle blog focused on Nashville. The website expanded from covering topics like food and fashion to becoming a more general lifestyle publication focused primarily on the South as a region. In addition to its regional content, StyleBlueprint has city editions for Nashville, Memphis, Birmingham, and Louisville areas. StyleBlueprint publishes daily articles, local guides, and has a strong social media presence.
