= Alys Thomas =

British swimmer (born 1990)

Personal information
- Full name: Alys Margaret Thomas
- Nationality: British
- Born: 10 October 1990 (age 35)

Sport
- Sport: Swimming
- Strokes: Butterfly
Medal record
Women's swimming
Representing Wales
Commonwealth Games
| Gold medal – first place | 2018 Gold Coast | 200 m butterfly |
| Bronze medal – third place | 2018 Gold Coast | 4×100 m medley |
Representing Great Britain
European Championships (LC)
| Bronze medal – third place | 2018 Glasgow | 200 m butterfly |
| Bronze medal – third place | 2018 Glasgow | 4×100m medley |

Alys Margaret Thomas (born 10 October 1990) is a British professional swimmer. She gained a gold medal and the 200m Butterfly Commonwealth games record in 2018.

== Life ==
She was born in 1990 and she went to Lady Eleanor Holles School in Hampton, London.

She competed in the women's 100 metre butterfly event at the 2017 World Aquatics Championships. She won the women's 200 metres butterfly title at the Commonwealth Games in 2018, setting a new games record. She also won two bronze medals at the 2018 European Championships.

In April 2021, Thomas was named as a member of the British team to go to the postponed 2020 Olympics.
