= Lana Pudar =

Bosnian swimmer (born 2006)

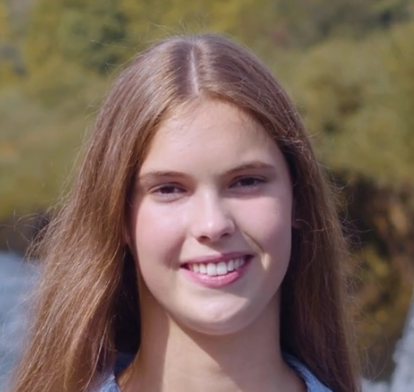
- Pudar in 2022

Personal information
- Born: 19 January 2006 (age 20) Mostar, Bosnia and Herzegovina

Sport
- Sport: Swimming
- Strokes: Butterfly
- Club: KVS Orka Mostar
Medal record
Women's swimming
Representing Bosnia and Herzegovina
World Championships (LC)
| Bronze medal – third place | 2024 Doha | 200 m butterfly |
World Championships (SC)
| Bronze medal – third place | 2021 Abu Dhabi | 200 m butterfly |
European Championships (LC)
| Gold medal – first place | 2022 Rome | 200 m butterfly |
| Silver medal – second place | 2024 Belgrade | 200 m butterfly |
| Bronze medal – third place | 2022 Rome | 100 m butterfly |
European Championships (SC)
| Bronze medal – third place | 2023 Otopeni | 200 m butterfly |
Mediterranean Games
| Gold medal – first place | 2022 Oran | 100 m butterfly |
| Gold medal – first place | 2022 Oran | 200 m butterfly |
World Junior Championships
| Gold medal – first place | 2023 Netanya | 200 m butterfly |
| Gold medal – first place | 2023 Netanya | 100 m butterfly |
| Silver medal – second place | 2023 Netanya | 50 m butterfly |
European U23 Championships
| Silver medal – second place | 2025 Samorin | 200 m butterfly |
European Junior Championships
| Gold medal – first place | 2021 Rome | 100 m butterfly |
| Gold medal – first place | 2022 Otopeni | 50 m butterfly |
| Gold medal – first place | 2022 Otopeni | 200 m butterfly |
| Gold medal – first place | 2023 Belgrade | 50 m butterfly |
| Gold medal – first place | 2023 Belgrade | 100 m butterfly |
| Gold medal – first place | 2023 Belgrade | 200 m butterfly |
| Silver medal – second place | 2021 Rome | 50 m butterfly |
| Silver medal – second place | 2021 Rome | 200 m butterfly |
| Silver medal – second place | 2022 Otopeni | 100 m butterfly |

Lana Pudar (Serbian Cyrillic: Лана Пудар; born 19 January 2006) is a Bosnian competitive swimmer specializing in the butterfly events. She won the gold medal in the women's 200 m butterfly and a bronze medal in the women's 100 m butterfly at the 2022 European Aquatics Championships, and a bronze in the women's 200 m butterfly at the 2021 FINA World Swimming Championships. She competed at the 2020 and 2024 Summer Olympics.

Pudar is the national record holder in all six butterfly events, and a Mediterranean Games record holder in the 100 m women's butterfly event.

== Career ==
In 2021, at the European Junior Championships, Pudar won the gold medal in the 100 m butterfly and silver medals in the 50 m butterfly and 200 m butterfly.

As the second youngest swimmer at the 2020 Summer Olympics, she finished 19th in the women's 100 metre butterfly.

At the 2021 FINA Short Course World Swimming Championships, Pudar won bronze in the 200 m butterfly and brought Bosnia and Herzegovina its first ever senior international swimming medal. At the 2022 European Aquatics Championships held in Rome, Pudar won gold in the 200 m butterfly and bronze in the 100 m butterfly, breaking national records in both finals.

== Personal life ==
Lana is the daughter of former footballer Velibor Pudar.

== Results ==
=== Individual ===
==== Long course ====
| Year | Competition | Venue | Position | Event | Notes |
Representing Bosnia and Herzegovina
| 2021 | Olympic Games | Tokyo, Japan | 19th (h) | 100 m butterfly | 58.32 |
| 2022 | World Championships | Budapest, Hungary | 29th (h) | 50 m butterfly | 27.14 |
| 2022 | World Championships | Budapest, Hungary | 8th | 100 m butterfly | 58.44 |
| 2022 | World Championships | Budapest, Hungary | 6th | 200 m butterfly | 2:07.85 |
| 2022 | Mediterranean Games | Oran, Algeria | 5th | 50 m butterfly | 26.77 |
| 2022 | Mediterranean Games | Oran, Algeria | 1st | 100 m butterfly | 57.55 GR |
| 2022 | Mediterranean Games | Oran, Algeria | 1st | 200 m butterfly | 2:09.18 |
| 2022 | European Championships | Rome, Italy | 10th (sf) | 50 m butterfly | 26.56 |
| 2022 | European Championships | Rome, Italy | 3rd | 100 m butterfly | 57.27 NR |
| 2022 | European Championships | Rome, Italy | 1st | 200 m butterfly | 2:06.81 NR |
| 2023 | World Championships | Fukuoka, Japan | 10th (sf) | 100 m butterfly | 57.34 |
| 2023 | World Championships | Fukuoka, Japan | 4th | 200 m butterfly | 2:07.05 |
| 2024 | World Championships | Doha, Qatar | 3rd | 200 m butterfly | 2:07.92 |
| 2024 | European Championships | Belgrade, Serbia | 8th | 100 m butterfly | 59.01 |
| 2024 | European Championships | Belgrade, Serbia | 2nd | 200 m butterfly | 2:08.15 |
| 2024 | Olympic Games | Paris, France | 17th (h) | 100 m butterfly | 57.97 |
| 2024 | Olympic Games | Paris, France | 12th (sf) | 200 m butterfly | 2:08.74 |

==== Short course ====
| Year | Competition | Venue | Position | Event | Notes |
Representing Bosnia and Herzegovina
| 2021 | European Championships | Kazan, Russia | 15th (sf) | 50 m butterfly | 26.40 |
| 2021 | European Championships | Kazan, Russia | 6th | 100 m butterfly | 56.78 |
| 2021 | European Championships | Kazan, Russia | 5th | 200 m butterfly | 2:05.89 |
| 2021 | World Championships | Abu Dhabi, United Arab Emirates | 23rd (h) | 50 m butterfly | 26.37 |
| 2021 | World Championships | Abu Dhabi, United Arab Emirates | 7th | 100 m butterfly | 56.51 |
| 2021 | World Championships | Abu Dhabi, United Arab Emirates | 3rd | 200 m butterfly | 2:04.88 |
| 2022 | World Championships | Melbourne, Australia | 33rd (h) | 100 m freestyle | 54.76 |
| 2022 | World Championships | Melbourne, Australia | 10th (sf) | 100 m butterfly | 56.71 |
| 2022 | World Championships | Melbourne, Australia | 5th | 200 m butterfly | 2:05.23 |
| 2023 | European Championships | Otopeni, Romania | 6th | 100 m butterfly | 56.91 |
| 2023 | European Championships | Otopeni, Romania | 3rd | 200 m butterfly | 2:04.55 EJR |

== Personal bests ==
| Event | Result | SP | Competition | Venue | Date |
Long course
| 50 m Butterfly | 26.10 NR | 820 | Junior European Championships | (Serbia) Belgrade | 9 July 2023 |
| 100 m Butterfly | 56.95 NR | 924 | Junior European Championships | (Serbia) Belgrade | 7 July 2023 |
| 200 m Butterfly | 2:06.26 NR | 897 | Junior European Championships | (Serbia) Belgrade | 8 July 2023 |
Short course
| 400 m Freestyle | 4:10.83 NR | 811 | Mladost Grand Prix | (Croatia) Zagreb | 13 November 2022 |
| 50 m Butterfly | 26.09 NR | 815 | FINA World Cup | (Russia) Kazan | 29 October 2021 |
| 100 m Butterfly | 56.28 NR | 912 | World Championships | (United Arab Emirates) Abu Dhabi | 20 December 2021 |
| 200 m Butterfly | 2:04.55 NR | 886 | European Championships | (Romania) Otopeni | 7 December 2023 |

- This list only includes times above 800 Swimming points.
