= Svetlana Chimrova =

Russian swimmer (born 1996)

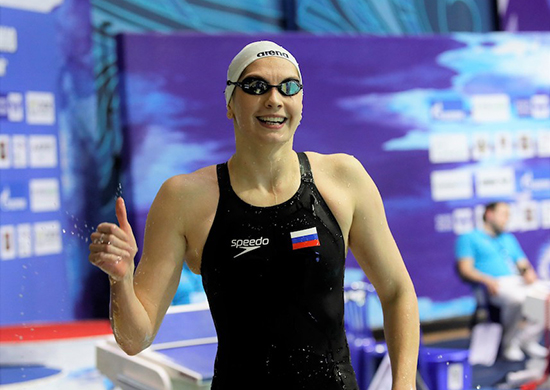
- Chimrova in 2017

Personal information
- Native name: Светлана Михайловна Чимрова
- Full name: Svetlana Mikhailovna Chimrova
- Nationality: Russian
- Born: 15 April 1996 (age 30) Moscow, Russia
- Height: 173 cm (5 ft 8 in)
- Weight: 61 kg (134 lb)

Sport
- Sport: Swimming
- Strokes: Butterfly
Medal record
Women's swimming
Representing Russia
World Championships (LC)
| Silver medal – second place | 2017 Budapest | 4×100 m medley |
| Bronze medal – third place | 2013 Barcelona | 4×100 m medley |
European Championships (LC)
| Gold medal – first place | 2018 Glasgow | 4×100 m medley |
| Silver medal – second place | 2018 Glasgow | 100 m butterfly |
| Silver medal – second place | 2018 Glasgow | 200 m butterfly |
| Silver medal – second place | 2018 Glasgow | 4×100 m mixed medley |
| Silver medal – second place | 2020 Budapest | 4×100 m medley |
| Bronze medal – third place | 2014 Berlin | 4×100 m mixed medley |
| Bronze medal – third place | 2020 Budapest | 200 m butterfly |
European Championships (SC)
| Gold medal – first place | 2021 Kazan | 200 m butterfly |
| Bronze medal – third place | 2013 Herning | 4×50 m freestyle |
| Bronze medal – third place | 2021 Kazan | 4×50 m mixed medley |
Summer Universiade
| Silver medal – second place | 2015 Gwangju | 50 m butterfly |
Military World Games
| Silver medal – second place | 2019 Wuhan | 4×100 m medley |

Svetlana Mikhailovna Chimrova (Russian: Светлана Михайловна Чимрова; born 15 April 1996) is a Russian swimmer. She competed in the women's 100 metre butterfly event at the 2016 Summer Olympics. In 2020, Chimrova took part in the International Swimming League as a member of the US-based team New York Breakers.
