= Laura Cabanes =

Spanish swimmer (born 2006)

Personal information
- Full name: Laura Cabanes Garzás
- Born: 3 January 2006 (age 20) Daimiel, Spain

Sport
- Sport: Swimming
Medal record
Representing Spain
European Championships (LC)
| Bronze medal – third place | 2026 Paris | 200 m butterfly |

Laura Cabanes Garzás (Note: In this Spanish name, the first or paternal surname is Cabanes and the second or maternal family name is Garzás.) (born 3 January 2006) is a Spanish competitive swimmer. She represented Spain at the 2024 Summer Olympics.
