= Ilaria Cusinato =

Italian swimmer (born 1999)

Personal information
- Nationality: Italian
- Born: 5 October 1999 (age 27) Cittadella, Italy

Sport
- Sport: Swimming
- Strokes: Medley
- Club: Gruppo Sportivo Fiamme Oro
Medal record
Representing Italy
European Championships (LC)
Silver medal – second place	2018 Glasgow	200 m medley
Silver medal – second place	2018 Glasgow	400 m medley
Bronze medal – third place	2022 Rome	200 m butterfly
European Championships (SC)
Bronze medal – third place	2017 Copenhagen	200 m medley
Bronze medal – third place	2019 Glasgow	400 m medley
European Games
Silver medal – second place	2015 Baku	200 m medley
Silver medal – second place	2015 Baku	400 m medley
European Junior Championships
Gold medal – first place	2016 Hódmezővásárhely	200 m medley
Gold medal – first place	2016 Hódmezővásárhely	Mixed 4×100 m medley
Silver medal – second place	2016 Hódmezővásárhely	4×100 m medley
Bronze medal – third place	2016 Hódmezővásárhely	Mixed 4×100 m freestyle
Universiade
Bronze medal – third place	2019 Naples	400 m medley

Ilaria Cusinato (born 5 October 1999) is an Italian swimmer. She competed at the 2020 Summer Olympics in 200 m individual medley and 400 m individual medley.

She competed in the women's 400 metre individual medley event at the 2018 European Aquatics Championships, winning the silver medal. Cusinato is an athlete of the Gruppo Sportivo Fiamme Oro.

At the 2022 European Aquatics Championships, Cusinato won the bronze medal in the 200 metre butterfly with a time of 2:07.77.

== See also ==
- List of European Aquatics Championships medalists in swimming (women)
- List of European Short Course Swimming Championships medalists (women)
