= Keanna MacInnes =

British swimmer (born 2001)

Personal information
- Full name: Keanna Louise MacInnes
- Nationality: British (Scottish)
- Born: 19 August 2001 (age 25) Edinburgh, Scotland

Sport
- Sport: Swimming
- Event: Butterfly
- University team: University of Stirling
Medal record
Representing Great Britain
European Championships (LC)
Gold medal – first place	2026 Paris	200 m butterfly
Gold medal – first place	2026 Paris	4x100 m medley
European U-23 Swimming Championships
Gold medal – first place	2023 Dublin	100m butterfly
Gold medal – first place	2023 Dublin	200m butterfly
Silver medal – second place	2023 Dublin	Mixed 4x400 m medley
Representing Scotland
British Swimming Championships
Gold medal – first place	2023 Sheffield	100m butterfly
Gold medal – first place	2024 London	100m butterfly
Gold medal – first place	2024 London	200m butterfly
Gold medal – first place	2025 London	200m butterfly
Gold medal – first place	2025 London	100m butterfly
Gold medal – first place	2026 London	200m butterfly
Gold medal – first place	2026 London	100m butterfly

Keanna Louise MacInnes (born 19 August 2001) is a British swimmer who competed at the 2024 Summer Olympics. She is the 2026 European champion in the women's 200 metre butterfly and the women's 4 x 100 metres medley relay.

== Career ==
Macinnes made her Commonwealth Games debut at the age of 16, in the Women's 100m Butterfly, Women's 200m Butterfly and the Women's 4 × 100 m Medley Relay. Four years later she competed in the same three events at the 2022 Commonwealth Games.

In 2023 at the inaugural under-23 European Championships she won gold in the 100 and 200 metre butterfly events.

She won the gold medal at the 2023 British Swimming Championships in the 100 metres butterfly. The success led to her selection for the 2023 World Championships.

After winning both the 100 metres butterfly and the 200 metres butterfly at the 2024 Aquatics GB Swimming Championships, Macinnes sealed her place at the 2024 Summer Olympics. At the Olympic Games, Macinnes reached the semi finals of the women's 100 metre butterfly.

In 2025, Macinnes successfully defended her 200 metres butterfly title at the 2025 Aquatics GB Swimming Championships, which sealed a qualification place for the 2025 World Aquatics Championships in Singapore.
