= Amina Kajtaz =

Croatian swimmer (born 1996)

Amina Kajtaz Pinjo
Personal information
- Nationality: Bosnian, Croatian
- Born: 31 December 1996 (age 29) Nuremberg, Germany
- Height: 173 cm (5 ft 8 in)
- Weight: 62 kg (137 lb)

Sport
- Sport: Swimming

Amina Kajtaz Pinjo (born 31 December 1996) is a Bosnian and Croatian swimmer. As of 2022 she is representing Croatia, but before that she represented Bosnia and Herzegovina. Kajtaz competed in the women's 100 metre butterfly event at the 2016 Summer Olympics. She is the daughter of Bosnian former footballer Sead Kajtaz.

== Results ==
=== Individual ===
==== Long course ====
Year	Competition	Venue	Position	Event	Notes
Representing Bosnia and Herzegovina
2014	European Championships	Berlin, Germany	44th (h)	50 m backstroke	31.54
2014	European Championships	Berlin, Germany	39th (h)	100 m backstroke	1:07.92
2014	European Championships	Berlin, Germany	35th (h)	50 m butterfly	28.57
2014	European Championships	Berlin, Germany	31st (h)	100 m butterfly	1:05.17
2015	World Championships	Kazan, Russia	42nd (h)	50 m butterfly	28.32
2015	World Championships	Kazan, Russia	48th (h)	100 m butterfly	1:03.39
2016	European Championships	(United Kingdom) London, Great Britain	30th (h)	50 m butterfly	27.37
2016	European Championships	(United Kingdom) London, Great Britain	30th (h)	100 m butterfly	1:01.21
2016	Olympic Games	Rio de Janeiro, Brazil	36th (h)	100 m butterfly	1:01.67
2017	World Championships	Budapest, Hungary	33rd (h)	50 m butterfly	27.35
2017	World Championships	Budapest, Hungary	29th (h)	100 m butterfly	1:00.77
2018	Mediterranean Games	Tarragona, Spain	9th (h)	50 m butterfly	27.50
2018	Mediterranean Games	Tarragona, Spain	6th	100 m butterfly	59.87
2018	European Championships	(United Kingdom) Glasgow, Great Britain	29th (h)	50 m butterfly	27.56
2018	European Championships	(United Kingdom) Glasgow, Great Britain	16th (sf)	100 m butterfly	59.54
2018	European Championships	(United Kingdom) Glasgow, Great Britain	20th (h)	200 m butterfly	2:14.85
2019	World Championships	Gwangju, South Korea	22nd (h)	100 m butterfly	59.08
2019	World Championships	Gwangju, South Korea	23rd (h)	200 m butterfly	2:13.70
2021	European Championships	Budapest, Hungary	23rd (h)	100 m butterfly	59.87
2021	European Championships	Budapest, Hungary	15th (sf)	200 m butterfly	2:15.52
2021	European Championships	Budapest, Hungary	35th (h)	200 m medley	2:21.68
Representing Croatia
2022	European Championships	Rome, Italy	26th (h)	50 m butterfly	27.56
2022	European Championships	Rome, Italy		100 m butterfly	DSQ
2022	European Championships	Rome, Italy	12th (sf)	200 m butterfly	2:14.40

==== Short course ====
Year	Competition	Venue	Position	Event	Notes
Representing Bosnia and Herzegovina
2016	World Championships	Windsor, Canada	24th (h)	50 m butterfly	26.87
2016	World Championships	Windsor, Canada	31st (h)	100 m butterfly	1:00.36
2017	European Championships	Copenhagen, Denmark	53rd (h)	50 m freestyle	26.12
2017	European Championships	Copenhagen, Denmark	34th (h)	50 m butterfly	27.14
2017	European Championships	Copenhagen, Denmark	23rd (h)	100 m butterfly	59.61
2018	World Championships	Hangzhou, China	32nd (h)	50 m butterfly	27.11
2018	World Championships	Hangzhou, China	20th (h)	100 m butterfly	58.78
2018	World Championships	Hangzhou, China	18th (h)	200 m butterfly	2:12.95
2019	European Championships	(United Kingdom) Glasgow, Great Britain	29th (h)	50 m butterfly	27.26
2019	European Championships	(United Kingdom) Glasgow, Great Britain	21st (h)	100 m butterfly	59.64
2019	European Championships	(United Kingdom) Glasgow, Great Britain	15th (h)	200 m butterfly	2:10.49

=== Relay ===
==== Short course ====
Year	Competition	Venue	Team	Position	Event	Notes
Representing Bosnia and Herzegovina
2018	World Championships	Hangzhou, China	Bjelajac / Mešetović / Kajtaz / Medošević	17th (h)	Mixed 4×50 m freestyle	1:36.16

== Personal bests ==
Event	Result	SP	Competition	Venue	Date
Long course
200 m Freestyle	2:03.65	762	Croatian Championships	(Croatia) Zagreb	21 June 2019
100 m Butterfly	59.08	828	World Championships	(South Korea) Gwangju	21 July 2019
200 m Butterfly	2:13.05	767	Victoria Primorje Meeting	(Croatia) Rijeka	17 February 2019
200 m Medley	2:17.29	775	Croatian Team Championships	(Croatia) Zagreb	29 May 2021
Short course
200 m Freestyle	2:00.56	768	Croatian Championships	(Croatia) Split	14 December 2019
50 m Butterfly	26.70	761	Swimming World Cup Event 5	(United Arab Emirates) Dubai	5 October 2016
100 m Butterfly	58.78	801	World Championships	(China) Hangzhou	15 December 2018
200 m Butterfly	2:09.73 NR	783	Croatian Championships	(Croatia) Split	14 December 2019

- This list include only above 750 Swimming points time.
