= Helena Rosendahl Bach =

Danish freestyle swimmer

Personal information
- Nationality: Danish
- Born: 12 June 2000 (age 26) Holstebro, Denmark

Sport
- Sport: Swimming
- Strokes: Butterfly, Freestyle
- Club: Aalborg Svømmeklub
- Coach: Bjørn Sørensen
Medal record
Women's swimming
Representing Denmark
World Championships (LC)
Silver medal – second place	2024 Doha	200 m butterfly
European Championships (LC)
Gold medal – first place	2024 Belgrade	200 m butterfly
Silver medal – second place	2022 Rome	200 m butterfly
Silver medal – second place	2026 Paris	200 m butterfly
European Championships (SC)
Silver medal – second place	2021 Kazan	200 m butterfly
Silver medal – second place	2025 Lublin	200 m butterfly

Helena Rosendahl Bach also simply known as Helena Bach (born 12 June 2000) is a Danish freestyle swimmer. She represented Denmark at the 2020 Summer Olympics which also marked her debut appearance at the Olympics. During the 2020 Summer Olympics, she competed in the women's 1500m freestyle and in the women's 200 metre butterfly. Incidentally, the women's 1500m freestyle event also made its Olympic debut during the Tokyo Olympics.
