= Laura Lahtinen =

Finnish swimmer (born 2003)

Personal information
- Nationality: Finnish
- Born: 3 June 2003 (age 23)

Sport
- Sport: Swimming
Medal record
Representing Finland
European U23 Championships
Bronze medal – third place	2025 Samorin	200 m butterfly

Laura Lahtinen (born 3 June 2003) is a Finnish swimmer. She competed in the women's 400 metre freestyle and the women's 200 metre butterfly at the 2019 World Aquatics Championships. She represents swim club Helsingfors Simsällskap.
