= China at the 2026 Asian Games =

- IOC code: CHN
- NOC: Chinese Olympic Committee external link (in Chinese and English)

in Aichi Prefecture and Nagoya, Japan 19 September 2026 – 4 October 2026
- Competitors: 815 (411 men and 404 women) in 45 sports
- Flag bearers (opening): Hu Mingxuan & Wu Yu
- Flag bearer (closing): Bi Kun
- Medals Ranked 1st: Gold 169 Silver 89 Bronze 83 Total 341

Asian Games appearances (overview)
- 1974; 1978; 1982; 1986; 1990; 1994; 1998; 2002; 2006; 2010; 2014; 2018; 2022; 2026

The People's Republic of China competed at the 2026 Asian Games in Nagoya, Aichi Prefecture, Japan, from 19 September to 4 October 2026.

== Medalists ==
Medal	Name	Sport	Event	Date

== Competitors ==
The following is the list of number of competitors in the Games.

Sport	Men	Women	Total
3x3 basketball	4	4	8
Archery	6	6	12
Artistic swimming	1	9	10
Athletics	36	36	72
Badminton	10	10	20
Baseball	24	0	24
Basketball	12	12	24
Beach volleyball	4	4	8
Boxing	6	5	11
Breaking	2	2	4
Canoeing	11	11	22
Cricket	0	15	15
Cycling	19	18	37
Diving	6	6	12
Equestrian	4	4	8
Esports	22	1	23
Fencing	12	12	24
Field hockey	20	20	40
Football	23	23	46
Golf	3	3	6
Gymnastics	7	14	21
Handball	16	16	32
Judo	7	6	13
Karate	0	2	2
Modern pentathlon	4	4	8
Rowing	15	15	30
Rugby sevens	13	13	26
Sailing	5	5	10
Shooting	15	15	30
Skateboarding	4	4	8
Softball	0	17	17
Sport climbing	4	4	8
Squash	4	4	8
Surfing	2	2	4
Swimming	22	22	44
Table tennis	5	5	10
Taekwondo	4	4	8
Tennis	5	5	10
Triathlon	3	3	6
Volleyball	12	12	24
Water polo	15	15	30
Weightlifting	5	5	10
Wrestling	12	6	18
Wushu	7	5	12
Total	411	404	815

== Archery ==
China entered 12 athletes into the Games. Only the top two archers from each country in the ranking round were allowed to progress to the knockout stage.

Men

Athlete	Event	Ranking round		Round of 64	Round of 32	Round of 16	Quarterfinals	Semifinals	Final / BM	
Athlete	Event	Score	Seed	Opposition Score	Opposition Score	Opposition Score	Opposition Score	Opposition Score	Opposition Score	Rank
Li Mengqi	Individual recurve	678	13	Bye	Sun (CHN); W 6–2	Tshering (BHU); L 5–6	Did not advance			
Sun Jingxuan	Individual recurve	669	23	Bye	Li (CHN); L 2–6	Did not advance				
Wang Yan	Individual recurve	668	24	Did not advance						
Liao Jiahao	Individual compound	712	1	—N/a	Bye	Mussa (KAZ); W 146–145	Kim J-h (KOR); L 142–143	Did not advance		
Liu Jinyi	Individual compound	712	2	—N/a	Al-Menhali (UAE); W 148–139	Rakib (BAN); W 148–145	Chang (TPE); L 143–144	Did not advance		
Shi Jingyu	Individual compound	706	9	—N/a	Did not advance					
Li Mengqi; Sun Jingxuan; Wang Yan	Team recurve	2015	7	—N/a	Bye	Kazakhstan; W 5–3	India; L 1–5	Did not advance		
Liao Jiahao; Liu Jinyi; Shi Jingyu	Team compound	2130	1	—N/a		Bye	Kazakhstan; W 237–231	Chinese Taipei; W 236–228	India; L 237–238	2nd place, silver medalist(s)

Women

Athlete	Event	Ranking round		Round of 64	Round of 32	Round of 16	Quarterfinals	Semifinals	Final / BM	
Athlete	Event	Score	Seed	Opposition Score	Opposition Score	Opposition Score	Opposition Score	Opposition Score	Opposition Score	Rank
Huang Yuwei	Individual recurve	664	11	Bye	Abdusattorova (UZB); W 6–0	Syedabdulhye (QAT); W 6–2	Asakuno (JPN); W 6–0	Oh Y-j (KOR); L 3–7	Zhu (CHN); W 6–4	3rd place, bronze medalist(s)
Yu Qi	Individual recurve	654	18	Did not advance						
Zhu Jingyi	Individual recurve	674	5	Bye	Shimu (BAN); W 6–0	Choirunisa (INA); W 6–2	Li (TPE); W 6–0	Mohod (IND); L 2–6	Huang (CHN); L 4–6	4
Wang Yue	Individual compound	698	14	Did not advance						
Wei Fangyao	Individual compound	700	10	Bye	Cojuangco (PHI); L 145–146	Did not advance				
Wunier	Individual compound	701	5	Bye	Wang (HKG); W 149–143	Pereira (INA); W 148–145	Kang Y-s (KOR); L 140–145	Did not advance		
Huang Yuwei; Yu Qi; Zhu Jingyi	Team recurve	1992	2	—N/a		Kyrgyzstan; W 6–0	Vietnam; W 5–4	India; L 1–5	Indonesia; W 6–2	3rd place, bronze medalist(s)
Wang Yue; Wei Fangyao; Wunier	Team compound	2099	1	—N/a		Bye	Vietnam; W 226–223	Chinese Taipei; W 230–229	India; L 234–238	2nd place, silver medalist(s)

Mixed

Athlete	Event	Ranking round		Round of 32	Round of 16	Quarterfinals	Semifinals	Final / BM	
Athlete	Event	Score	Seed	Opposition Score	Opposition Score	Opposition Score	Opposition Score	Opposition Score	Rank
Li Mengqi; Zhu Jingyi	Mixed team recurve	1352	5	Bye	Kazakhstan; W 6–2	Chinese Taipei; W 6–2	South Korea; W 6–0	India; W 5–3	1st place, gold medalist(s)
Liu Jinyi; Wei Fangyao	Mixed team compound	1413	2	—N/a	United Arab Emirates; W 153–150	Indonesia; W 156–155	South Korea; L 156–159	Thailand; W 158–154	3rd place, bronze medalist(s)

== Artistic swimming ==
China entered 10 athletes into the Games.

Athlete	Event	Technical routine		Free routine		Acrobatic Routine		Total	Rank
Athlete	Event	Points	Rank	Points	Rank	Points	Rank	Total	Rank
Lin Yanjun; Xu Huiyan	Women's duet	317.5108	1	322.8468	1	—N/a		640.3576	1st place, gold medalist(s)
Chang Hao; Dai Shiyi; Guo Muye; Li Xiuchen; Lin Yanhan; Lin Yanjun; Xiang Binxuan; Xu Huiyan; Zhang Xiaoyou; Zhang Yayi	Team	312.1990	1	299.2117	1	246.0977	1	857.5084	1st place, gold medalist(s)

== Athletics ==
China entered 72 athletes into the Games.

Track and road events
Men

Athlete	Event	Heat		Semifinal		Final	
Athlete	Event	Time	Rank	Time	Rank	Time	Rank
Xie Zhenye	100 m	10.30	1 Q	10.18	2 Q	10.30	7
Zeng Keli	100 m	10.22	2 Q	10.24	3 q	10.23	6
Huang Youwen	200 m	20.90	1 Q	20.42	1 Q	20.45	2nd place, silver medalist(s)
Liu Kai	400 m	46.37	5	—N/a		Did not advance	
Xi Xiaoheng	800 m	1:49.82	1 Q	—N/a		1:45.46	4
Liu Dezhu	1500 m	3:46.11	5 Q	—N/a		3:38.03	4
Xi Xiaoheng	1500 m	3:45.74	2 Q	—N/a		4:50.83	12
Wang Wenjie	10000 m	—N/a				28:38.14	4
Chen Yuanjiang	110 m hurdles	13.52	1 Q	—N/a		13.15	1st place, gold medalist(s)
Liu Junxi	110 m hurdles	13.69	3 Q	—N/a		DNF	
Chen Jinfeng; Wang Shengjie; Xie Zhenye; Zeng Keli; Shi Junhao^{h}	4 × 100 m relay	38.41	1 Q	—N/a		38.17	1st place, gold medalist(s)
Ding Wenhao; Liang Baotang; Liu Kai; Xiao Heng; Ailixier Wumaier^{h} Chen Zhisheng^{h}	4 × 400 m relay	3:02.15	3 Q	—N/a		3:02.27	5
Feng Peiyou	Marathon	—N/a				2:12:13	3rd place, bronze medalist(s)
Jia Erenjia	Marathon	—N/a				2:19:18	12
Li Chenjie	Half marathon race walk	—N/a				DSQ	
Shi Shengji	Half marathon race walk	—N/a				1:23:32	1st place, gold medalist(s)
Tang Yushuai	Marathon race walk	—N/a				3:13:54	4
Zhou Yingcheng	Marathon race walk	—N/a				3:06:40	2nd place, silver medalist(s)

Women

Athlete	Event	Heat		Semifinal		Final	
Athlete	Event	Time	Rank	Time	Rank	Time	Rank
Chen Yujie	100 m	11.41	1 Q	11.41	2 Q	11.06 GR	1st place, gold medalist(s)
Ge Manqi	100 m	12.13	4	Did not advance			
Chen Yujie	200 m	23.29	1 Q	—N/a		22.93	2nd place, silver medalist(s)
Li Chunhui	800 m	2:02.35	2 Q	—N/a		2:06.39	6
Wu Hongjiao	800 m	2:03.37	3 Q	—N/a		2:04.49	1st place, gold medalist(s)
Li Chunhui	1500 m	—N/a				4:05.50	2nd place, silver medalist(s)
Lin Yuwei	100 m hurdles	13.52	3 Q	—N/a		13.47	7
Wu Yanni	100 m hurdles	13.18	2 Q	—N/a		13.12	3rd place, bronze medalist(s)
Kong Yingying	400 m hurdles	55.86	3 Q	—N/a		55.78	4
Chen Yujie; Liang Xiaojing; Liu Guoyi; Liu Xiajun; Zhu Junying^{h}	4 × 100 m relay	43.63	1 Q	—N/a		42.96	1st place, gold medalist(s)
Jiang Yutong; Kong Yingying; Zhou Li; Zuo Siyu	4 × 400 m relay	—N/a				3:31.02	3rd place, bronze medalist(s)
Ciren Cuomu	Marathon	—N/a				2:27:43	2nd place, silver medalist(s)
Wu Bing	Marathon	—N/a				2:32:09	8
Jiang Yunyan	Half marathon race walk	—N/a				1:35:26	3rd place, bronze medalist(s)
Yang Liujing	Half marathon race walk	—N/a				1:33:40	1st place, gold medalist(s)
Danzeng Quzong	Marathon race walk	—N/a				3:26:09	1st place, gold medalist(s)
Ma Li	Marathon race walk	—N/a				3:32:26	2nd place, silver medalist(s)

Mixed

Athlete	Event	Heat		Final	
Athlete	Event	Time	Rank	Time	Rank
Chen Jinfeng; Chen Yujie; Liu Guoyi; Shi Junhao; Wu Haolin^{h} Zhu Junying^{h}	4 × 100 m relay	41.52	1 Q	40.78	1st place, gold medalist(s)
Kong Yingying; Liang Baotang; Liu Kai; Zhou Li; Jiang Yutong^{h} Xiao Heng^{h}	4 × 400 m relay	3:15.97	1 Q	3:15.65	5

^{h} Athletes who participated in the heats only.

Field events
Men

Athlete	Event	Qualification		Final	
Athlete	Event	Result	Rank	Result	Rank
Li Chenyang	Pole vault	—N/a		5.70	3rd place, bronze medalist(s)
Yao Jie	Pole vault	—N/a		5.70	2nd place, silver medalist(s)
Shi Yuhao	Long jump	7.64	5 Q	8.17	1st place, gold medalist(s)
Yuan Chenlong	Long jump	7.40	11 Q	7.50	9
Ma Yinglong	Triple jump	—N/a		16.75	3rd place, bronze medalist(s)
Su Wen	Triple jump	—N/a		17.42 GR	1st place, gold medalist(s)
Xing Jialiang	Shot put	—N/a		19.50	4
Abuduaini Tuergong	Discus throw	—N/a		64.26	1st place, gold medalist(s)
Wu Nanjun	Discus throw	—N/a		61.58	2nd place, silver medalist(s)
Wang Qi	Hammer throw	—N/a		70.93	6

Women

Athlete	Event	Final	
Athlete	Event	Result	Rank
Jin Ruoxuan	High jump	1.75	=10
Lu Jiawen	High jump	1.84	4
Niu Chunge	Pole vault	4.50	2nd place, silver medalist(s)
Huang Yingying	Long jump	6.55	1st place, gold medalist(s)
Tan Mengyi	Long jump	6.46	3rd place, bronze medalist(s)
Huang Yingying	Triple jump	14.12	2nd place, silver medalist(s)
Li Yi	Triple jump	13.83	3rd place, bronze medalist(s)
Song Jiayuan	Shot put	19.40	1st place, gold medalist(s)
Zhang Linru	Shot put	18.14	2nd place, silver medalist(s)
Feng Bin	Discus throw	63.83	1st place, gold medalist(s)
Jiang Zhichao	Discus throw	62.25	2nd place, silver medalist(s)
Zhang Jiale	Hammer throw	78.27 AS	1st place, gold medalist(s)
Zhao Jie	Hammer throw	74.83	2nd place, silver medalist(s)
Dai Qianqian	Javelin throw	58.56	6
Yan Ziyi	Javelin throw	70.46 GR	1st place, gold medalist(s)

== Badminton ==
China entered 20 athletes into the Games.

Men

Athlete	Event	Round of 64	Round of 32	Round of 16	Quarterfinal	Semifinal	Final	
Athlete	Event	Opposition Result	Opposition Result	Opposition Result	Opposition Result	Opposition Result	Opposition Result	Rank
Li Shifeng	Singles	Bye	Choi J-h (KOR); L (21–18, 19–21, 18–21)	Did not advance				
Shi Yuqi	Singles	Bye	Panarin (KAZ); W (20–22, 21–15, 21–17)	Yoo T-b (KOR); L (17–21, 23–25)	Did not advance			
He Jiting; Liu Yi	Doubles	—N/a	Yang / Lee (TPE); L (15–21, 19–21)	Did not advance				
Liang Weikeng; Wang Chang	Doubles	—N/a	Odbayar / Bayarsaikhan (MGL); W (21–5, 21–13)	Thongsa-nga / Charoenkitamorn (THA); W (21–15, 21–14)	Izzuddin / Goh (MAS); W (21–13, 21–17)	Alfian / Fikri (INA); W (21–17, 13–21, 21–9)	Marthin / Carnando (INA); L (21–19, 13–21, 18–21)	2nd place, silver medalist(s)

Women

Athlete	Event	Round of 64	Round of 32	Round of 16	Quarterfinal	Semifinal	Final	
Athlete	Event	Opposition Result	Opposition Result	Opposition Result	Opposition Result	Opposition Result	Opposition Result	Rank
Chen Yufei	Singles	Bye	Liang (HKG); W (21–11, 21–15)	Nguyễn (VIE); W (21–10, 22–24, 21–12)	Sindhu (IND); W (11–21, 21–18, 21–10)	An S-y (KOR); L (5–21, 12–21)	Did not advance	3rd place, bronze medalist(s)
Wang Zhiyi	Singles	Bye	Maharjan (NEP); W (21–4, 21–2)	Kim G-e (KOR); W (21–14, 11–6 retired)	Lin (TPE); W (21–7, 21–12)	Yamaguchi (JPN); L (11–21, 20–22)	Did not advance	3rd place, bronze medalist(s)
Jia Yifan; Zhang Shuxian	Doubles	—N/a	Bye	Nakanishi / Uesaka (JPN); L (21–9, 18–21, 15–21)	Did not advance			
Liu Shengshu; Tan Ning	Doubles	—N/a	Bye	Kim H-j / Lee Y-w (KOR); W (19–21, 21–9, 21–18)	Hsieh / Hung (TPE); W (21–15, 21–15)	Tan / Muralitharan (MAS); W (16–21, 22–20, 21–12)	Lee S-h / Baek H-n (KOR); L (26–28, 21–18, 21–18)	2nd place, silver medalist(s)

Mixed

Athlete	Event	Round of 32	Round of 16	Quarterfinal	Semifinal	Final	
Athlete	Event	Opposition Result	Opposition Result	Opposition Result	Opposition Result	Opposition Result	Rank
Feng Yanzhe; Huang Dongping	Doubles	Bye	Lui / Tse (HKG); W (21–10, 21–9)	Kapila / Crasto (IND); W (21–14, 18–21, 21–18)	Syahnawi / Marwah (INA); L (12–21, 14–21)	Did not advance	3rd place, bronze medalist(s)
Jiang Zhenbang; Wei Yaxin	Doubles	Bye	Chan / Ng (HKG); W (16–21, 21–19, 21–15)	Kim J-Y / Jang H-j (KOR); W (21–13, 21–15)	Ye / Chan (TPE); W (21–13, 21–9)	Syahnawi / Marwah (INA); W (21–19, 21–8)	1st place, gold medalist(s)

Team

Athlete	Event	Round of 16	Quarterfinal	Semifinal	Final	
Athlete	Event	Opposition Result	Opposition Result	Opposition Result	Opposition Result	Rank
Shi Yuqi; Li Shifeng; Weng Hongyang; Lu Guangzu; Liang Weikeng; Wang Chang; He Jiting; Liu Yi; Feng Yanzhe; Jiang Zhenbang	Men's	Bye	South Korea; W 3–2	India; W 3–1	Indonesia; L 2–3	2nd place, silver medalist(s)
Wang Zhiyi; Chen Yufei; Han Yue; Han Qianxi; Liu Shengshu; Tan Ning; Jia Yifan; Zhang Shuxian; Huang Dongping; Wei Yaxin	Women's	Bye	Thailand; W 3–0	Indonesia; W 3–0	Japan; W 3–0	1st place, gold medalist(s)

== Baseball ==
China entered 24 athletes into the Games.

Summary

Team	Event	Preliminary round				Super / Consolation Round			Final / BM	
Team	Event	Opposition Score	Opposition Score	Opposition Score	Rank	Opposition Score	Opposition Score	Rank	Opposition Score	Rank
China men's	Men's tournament	Japan; L 3–11	Philippines; W 15–8	Palestine; W 9–1	2 Q	Chinese Taipei; L 1–9	South Korea; L 2–9	4 Q	Chinese Taipei; L 1–5	4

Group play

Pos	Team	Pld	W	L	RF	RA	PCT	GB	Qualification
1	Japan	3	3	0	33	3	1.000	—	Super round
2	China	3	2	1	27	20	.667	1	Super round
3	Philippines	3	1	2	20	22	.333	2	Placement round
4	Palestine	3	0	3	1	36	.000	3	Placement round

21 September; 18:30	Japan	11–3	China	Toyohashi Municipal Baseball Stadium, Toyohashi; Attendance: 5,230; Umpires: Kim Minseo (KOR)
21 September; 18:30	WP: Shin Higuchi	Boxscore	LP: Wang Xiang	Toyohashi Municipal Baseball Stadium, Toyohashi; Attendance: 5,230; Umpires: Kim Minseo (KOR)
21 September; 18:30		Boxscore	HR: Luan Chenchen	Toyohashi Municipal Baseball Stadium, Toyohashi; Attendance: 5,230; Umpires: Kim Minseo (KOR)

22 September; 12:00	China	15–8	Philippines	Okazaki Municipal Baseball Stadium, Okazaki; Attendance: 784; Umpires: Fukazawa Shunichi (JPN)
22 September; 12:00	WP: Wu Anjun	Boxscore	LP: Amiel de Guzman	Okazaki Municipal Baseball Stadium, Okazaki; Attendance: 784; Umpires: Fukazawa Shunichi (JPN)

23 September; 18:30	Palestine	1–9	China	Okazaki Municipal Baseball Stadium, Okazaki; Attendance: 188; Umpires: Shinya Takahashi (JPN)
23 September; 18:30	LP: Brent Powers	Boxscore	WP: Sun Yicong	Okazaki Municipal Baseball Stadium, Okazaki; Attendance: 188; Umpires: Shinya Takahashi (JPN)

Super round

Pos	Team	Pld	W	L	RF	RA	PCT	GB	Qualification
1	Japan	3	3	0	23	6	1.000	—	Gold medal game
2	South Korea	3	2	1	14	7	.667	1	Gold medal game
3	Chinese Taipei	3	1	2	12	13	.333	2	Bronze medal game
4	China	3	0	3	6	29	.000	3	Bronze medal game

25 September; 18:30	Chinese Taipei	9–1	China	Okazaki Municipal Baseball Stadium, Okazaki; Attendance: 900; Umpires: Kim Minseo (KOR)
25 September; 18:30	WP: Wang Yan-cheng	Boxscore	LP: Xudi Suo	Okazaki Municipal Baseball Stadium, Okazaki; Attendance: 900; Umpires: Kim Minseo (KOR)
25 September; 18:30		Boxscore	HR: Chenchen Luan	Okazaki Municipal Baseball Stadium, Okazaki; Attendance: 900; Umpires: Kim Minseo (KOR)

26 September; 18:30	China	2–9	South Korea	Toyohashi Municipal Baseball Stadium, Toyohashi; Attendance: 1,100; Umpires: Chen Te-jung (TPE)
26 September; 18:30	LP: Wu Anjun	Boxscore	WP: Choi Min-seok	Toyohashi Municipal Baseball Stadium, Toyohashi; Attendance: 1,100; Umpires: Chen Te-jung (TPE)

Bronze medal game

27 September; 12:00	China	1–5	Chinese Taipei	Okazaki Municipal Baseball Stadium, Okazaki; Attendance: 2,530; Umpires: Masashi Ichiki (JPN)
27 September; 12:00	LP: Yicong Sun	Boxscore	WP: Yu-Min Lin	Okazaki Municipal Baseball Stadium, Okazaki; Attendance: 2,530; Umpires: Masashi Ichiki (JPN)

== Basketball ==
=== 5×5 basketball ===
Summary

Team	Event	Group stage				Quarterfinal	Semifinal	Final / BM	
Team	Event	Opposition Score	Opposition Score	Opposition Score	Rank	Opposition Score	Opposition Score	Opposition Score	Rank
China men's	Men's tournament	Kazakhstan; W 99–61	Bahrain; W 105–59	Philippines; W 105–61	1 Q	Saudi Arabia; W 87–78	Japan; L 77–97	Iran; L 70–79	4
China women's	Women's tournament	Thailand; W 111–46	Indonesia; W 110–41	—N/a	1 Q	Mongolia; W 89–63	South Korea; L 80–85	Chinese Taipei; W 77–64	3rd place, bronze medalist(s)

==== Men's tournament ====
Team roster

- Hu Mingxuan
- Liao Sanning
- Pang Zhenglin
- Wang Junjie
- Yu Jiahao
- Li Hongquan
- Jiao Boqiao
- Zhao Jiayi
- Hu Jinqiu
- Cui Yongxi
- Zhu Junlong
- Li Yuezhou

Group play

Pos	Team	Pld	W	L	PF	PA	PD	Pts	Qualification
1	China	3	3	0	309	181	+128	6	Quarterfinals
2	Bahrain	3	2	1	249	268	−19	5	Quarterfinals
3	Philippines	3	1	2	255	272	−17	4	
4	Kazakhstan	3	0	3	217	309	−92	3	

Source: AsianGames2026.org

11 September 2026
10:00

Report
Box score

China	99–61	Kazakhstan
Scoring by quarter: 31–12, 27–19, 21–13, 20–17
Pts: Pang, Yu 17; Rebs: Li H. 9 Asts: Liao 9		Pts: Maydekin 11; Rebs: Ivanov 7 Asts: Murzagaliyev 4

Aichi International Arena, Nagoya
Referees: Wissam Zein (SYR), Abdullah Al-Hejaili (KSA), Ami Takano (JPN)

12 September 2026
16:00

Report
Box score

Bahrain	59–105	China
Scoring by quarter: 11–32, 18–14, 13–25, 17–34
Pts: Sampson 17; Rebs: Sampson 5 Asts: Al-Derazi, Sampson 3		Pts: Liao 23; Rebs: Jiao, Yu 6 Asts: Pang 7

Aichi International Arena, Nagoya
Attendance: 8,181
Referees: Wissam Zein (SYR), Shigeyui Arisawa (JPN), Nattapong Jontapa (THA)

14 September 2026
13:00

Report
Box score

China	105–61	Philippines
Scoring by quarter: 36–16, 30–14, 13–10, 26–21
Pts: Wang 20; Rebs: Wang 14; Asts: four players 4		Pts: Oftana 13; Rebs: Lucero 6 Asts: Barefield, Bolick 4

Aichi International Arena, Nagoya
Attendance: 4,307
Referees: Rabah Noujaim (LBN), Wissam Zein (SYR), Nattapong Jontapa (THA)

Quarterfinals

16 September 2026
16:00

Report
Box score

China	87–78	Saudi Arabia
Scoring by quarter: 27–24, 21–15, 14–23, 25–16
Pts: Liao 30; Rebs: Cui, Yu 9 Asts: Liao 4		Pts: Abdur-Rahkman 25; Rebs: Al-Suwailem 10; Asts: three players 4

Aichi International Arena, Nagoya
Attendance: 5,504
Referees: Mohammad Taha (JOR), Nattapong Jontapa (THA), Lee Ji-youn (KOR)

Semifinals

18 September 2026
19:20

Report
Box score

Japan	97–77	China
Scoring by quarter: 28–15, 21–15, 34–22, 14–25
Pts: Kanechika 19; Rebs: Kirk 12; Asts: Ogawa 9		Pts: Hu J. 16; Rebs: Li H. 13; Asts: Liao 6

Aichi International Arena, Nagoya
Attendance: 5,758
Referees: Rabah Noujaim (LBN), Nattapong Jontapa (THA), Budi Marfan (INA)

Bronze medal game

20 September 2026
16:40

Report
Box score

China	70–79	Iran
Scoring by quarter: 17–12, 14–17, 15–26, 24–24
Pts: Pang 22; Rebs: Jiao, Wang 7 Asts: Liao 6		Pts: Aghajanpour 21; Rebs: Kazemi 15; Asts: Kazemi 6

Aichi International Arena, Nagoya
Attendance: 7,360
Referees: Shigeyuki Arisawa (JPN), Mohammad Taha (JOR), Abdullah Al-Hejaili (KSA)

==== Women's tournament ====
Team roster

- Zhang Manman
- Wang Siyu
- Yang Shuyu
- Deng Yuting
- Tang Ziting
- Luo Xinyu
- Chen Yujie
- Chen Mingling
- Zhang Ziyu
- Sun Yu
- Liu Yutong
- Jia Saiqi

Group play

Pos	Team	Pld	W	L	PF	PA	PD	Pts	Qualification
1	China	2	2	0	221	87	+134	4	Quarterfinals
2	Indonesia	2	1	1	102	162	−60	3	Quarterfinals
3	Thailand	2	0	2	98	172	−74	2	Quarterfinals

Source: aichi-nagoya2026.org

19 September 2026
10:00

Report
Result

Thailand	46–111	China
Scoring by quarter: 14–33, 14–24, 10–24, 8–30
Pts: Wongtapha 18; Rebs: Jensen 5 Asts: Wongtapha 3		Pts: Luo, Chen Y.J. 16; Rebs: Chen M.L. 9 Asts: Zhang 6

Aichi International Arena, Nagoya
Attendance: 4,382
Referees: Mahsa Kargari (IRN), Mandy Ngieng (MAS), Ami Takano (JPN)

21 September 2026
19:00

Report

China	110–41	Indonesia
Scoring by quarter: 19–13, 34–5, 27–9, 30–14
Pts: Zhang Ziyu 22; Rebs: Yang, Liu 10; Asts: Zhang Manman 10		Pts: Kusuma 8 Rebs: Kusuma 6 Asts: three players 2

Aichi International Arena, Nagoya
Referees: Mandy Ngieng (MAS), Yana Nikogossyan (KAZ), Rakesh Ramalingaiah (IND)

Quarterfinals

24 September 2026
13:00

Report

China	89–63	Mongolia
Scoring by quarter: 24–23, 25–5, 20–15, 20–20
Pts: Yang 21; Rebs: Zhang Z. 9 Asts: three players 5		Pts: Robinson 18; Rebs: Bulbul 9 Asts: four players 3

Aichi International Arena, Nagoya
Attendance: 3,686
Referees: Rakesh Ramalingaiah (IND), Glenn Cornelio (PHI), Mandy Ngieng (MAS)

Semifinals

25 September 2026
16:00

Report

China	80–85	South Korea
Scoring by quarter: 19–17, 22–19, 24–25, 15–24
Pts: Zhang Z. 22; Rebs: Chen 10; Asts: Wang 10		Pts: Lee S. 23; Rebs: Lee H., Lee S. 6 Asts: Heo 9

Aichi International Arena, Nagoya
Attendance: 3,593
Referees: Mohammad Taha (JOR), Glenn Cornelio (PHI), Yana Nikogossyan (KAZ)

Bronze medal game

26 September 2026
16:00

Report

Chinese Taipei	64–77	China
Scoring by quarter: 20–17, 16–19, 12–24, 16–17
Pts: Li Y. T. 15; Rebs: Hsiao 7 Asts: three players 3		Pts: Chen M. 20; Rebs: Luo 9 Asts: Luo, Yang 6

Aichi International Arena, Nagoya
Attendance: 7,089
Referees: Glenn Cornelio (PHI), Ami Takano (JPN), Abdullah Alhejaili (KSA)

=== 3×3 basketball ===
Summary

Team	Event	Group stage				Play-in	Quarterfinal	Semifinal	Final / BM	
Team	Event	Opposition Score	Opposition Score	Opposition Score	Rank	Opposition Score	Opposition Score	Opposition Score	Opposition Score	Rank
China men's	Men's tournament	Iran; L 15–18	Malaysia; W 22–14	Hong Kong; W 21–11	2 Q	Indonesia; W 21–10	South Korea; L 13–22	Did not advance		
China women's	Women's tournament	Kazakhstan; W 18–12	Qatar; W 21–3	Sri Lanka; W 21–2	1 Q	Bye	Japan; L 16–17	Did not advance		

==== Men's tournament ====
Group play

Pos	Team	Pld	W	L	PF	PA	PD	Pts	Qualification
1	Iran	3	3	0	55	33	+22	6	Quarterfinals
2	China	3	2	1	58	43	+15	5	Play-ins
3	Malaysia	3	1	2	39	58	−19	4	Play-ins
4	Hong Kong	3	0	3	37	55	−18	3	

Source: asiangames2026.org

22 September
12:50

Report

China	15–18	Iran
Pts: Ma 9		Pts: Momeni 9

Kinjō-futō Station Square, Nagoya
Referees: Alexander Rulyov (KAZ), Neoh Yuen (MAS)

22 September
14:30

Report

China	22–14	Malaysia
Pts: Liu 8		Pts: Chong 8

Kinjō-futō Station Square, Nagoya
Referees: Alexandr Rulyov (KAZ), Rina Nozaki (JPN)

23 September
18:30

Report

China	21–11	Hong Kong
Pts: Liu 9		Pts: Chan, Yang 5

Kinjō-futō Station Square, Nagoya
Referees: Rina Nozaki (JPN), Danusorn Laosaksam (THA)

Play-in

24 September
13:15

Report

China	21–10	Indonesia
Pts: Liu 12		Pts: Arip 4

Kinjō-futō Station Square, Nagoya
Referees: Alexandr Rulyov (KAZ), Neoh Yuen (MAS)

Quarterfinals

24 September
18:55

Report

South Korea	22–13	China
Pts: Ku, Lee J.Y. 6		Pts: Liu 7

Kinjō-futō Station Square, Nagoya
Referees: Rina Nozaki (JPN), Alexandr Rulyov (KAZ)

==== Women's tournament ====
Group play

Pos	Team	Pld	W	L	PF	PA	PD	Pts	Qualification
1	China	3	3	0	60	17	+43	6	Quarterfinals
2	Kazakhstan	3	2	1	50	34	+16	5	Play-ins
3	Sri Lanka	3	1	2	29	58	−29	4	Play-ins
4	Qatar	3	0	3	27	57	−30	3	

Source: 2026 Asian Games

22 September
17:40

Report

China	18–12	Kazakhstan
Pts: Zhang 7		Pts: Yuldasheva, Kydyrali 4

Kinjō-futō Station Square, Nagoya
Referees: Danusorn Laosaksam (THA), Liu Chee (MAS)

22 September
19:20

Report

China	21–3	Qatar
Pts: Zhang 7		Pts: Taweel 2

Kinjō-futō Station Square, Nagoya
Referees: Kim Ga-in (KOR), Danusorn Laosaksam (THA)

23 September
19:20

Report

China	21–2	Sri Lanka
Pts: Wang 8		Pts: Dharmasena 2

Kinjō-futō Station Square, Nagoya
Referees: Danusorn Laosaksam (THA), Rina Nozaki (JPN)

Quarterfinals

24 September
18:05

Report

Japan	17–16	China
Pts: Hirashita 7		Pts: Li, Wang 5

Kinjō-futō Station Square, Nagoya
Referees: Kim Ga-in (KOR), Neoh Yuen (MAS)

== Boxing ==
China entered 11 athletes into the Games.

Athlete	Event	Round of 32	Round of 16	Quarterfinal	Semifinal	Final	
Athlete	Event	Opposition Result	Opposition Result	Opposition Result	Opposition Result	Opposition Result	Rank
Zhang Jiamao	Men's 55 kg	Bye	Sufijonov (TJK); W 5–0	Paalam (PHI); L 2–3	Did not advance		
Chen Xinlin	Men's 60 kg	Kitamoto (JPN); L 0–5	Did not advance				
Li Guofeng	Men's 70 kg	Habibinezhad (IRI); W 3–2	Otgonbaatar (MGL); W RSC	Boltaev (UZB); L 0–5	Did not advance		
Wang Xiaobao	Men's 80 kg	—N/a	Jongjoho (THA); W 5–0	Iashaish (JOR); L 1–3	Did not advance		
Han Xuezhen	Men's 90 kg	—N/a	Bye	Yomkhot (THA); W 5–0	Karimov (TJK); W 4–0	Khabibullaev (UZB); L 0–5	2nd place, silver medalist(s)
Bayikewuzi Danabieke	Men's +90 kg	—N/a	Bye	Esmaeili Vandaei (IRI); L 2–3	Did not advance		
Wu Yu	Women's 51 kg	Bye	Ranasinghe Arachchige (SRI); W 5–0	Oyuntsetsegiin (MGL); W 5–0	Kazakova (UZB); W 5–0	Nguyễn (VIE); W 5–0	1st place, gold medalist(s)
Zhao Xuan	Women's 54 kg	Bye	Kyzaibay (KAZ); W 4–1	Wangmo (BHU); W 5–0	Pang (PRK); L 0–5	Did not advance	3rd place, bronze medalist(s)
Yang Chengyu	Women's 60 kg	—N/a	Ruenros (THA); W 3–2	Petecio (PHI); W 5–0	Priya (IND); W 4–1	Lin (TPE); L 0–5	2nd place, silver medalist(s)
Li Shu	Women's 65 kg	—N/a	Tamang (NEP); W 5–0	Abikeyeva (KAZ); W 4–0	Parveen (IND); L 0–5	Did not advance	3rd place, bronze medalist(s)
Bao Ziyi	Women's 75 kg	—N/a		Buapa (THA); W 5–0	Luu (VIE); W 5–0	Borgohain (IND); L 0–5	2nd place, silver medalist(s)

== Breaking ==
China entered 4 athletes into the Games.

Athlete	Nickname	Event	Pre-selection		Round of 16	Quarterfinal	Semifinal	Final / BM	
Athlete	Nickname	Event	Votes	Rank	Opposition Result	Opposition Result	Opposition Result	Opposition Result	Rank
Qi Xiangyu	Lithe-ing	B-Boys	80.73	7 Q	Jasper (TPE); W 2–1	Monkey Z (CHN); L 0–2	Did not advance		
Wang Ruimiao	Monkey Z	B-Boys	83.87	2 Q	Duk (MGL); W 2–0	Lithe-ing (CHN); W 2–0	Hongten (KOR); L 0–3	Issin (JPN); W 3–0	3rd place, bronze medalist(s)
Guo Pu	Royal	B-Girls	84.06	1 Q	Lola (TJK); W 2–0	Sophia (TPE); W 2–0	Ayane (JPN); W 3–0	Ayumi (JPN); W 3–0	1st place, gold medalist(s)
Liu Qingyi	671	B-Girls	83.21	2 Q	Handaa (MGL); W 2–0	Yell (KOR); W 2–0	Ayumi (JPN); L 1–2	Ayane (JPN); W 3–0	3rd place, bronze medalist(s)

== Canoeing ==
=== Slalom ===
China entered 6 athletes into the Games.

Slalom

Athlete	Event	Heat		Semifinal		Final	
Athlete	Event	Time	Rank	Time	Rank	Time	Rank
Zhang Zhicheng	Men's C-1	103.10	1 Q	101.45	1 Q	98.09	1st place, gold medalist(s)
Hu Zhaoshan	Men's K-1	97.32	2 Q	92.41	2 Q	91.41	1st place, gold medalist(s)
Quan Xin	Men's K-1	98.18	4 Q	96.83	4	Did not advance	
Huang Juan	Women's C-1	121.57	1 Q	117.96	1 Q	114.84	1st place, gold medalist(s)
Chen Lin	Women's K-1	111.20	2 Q	107.97	4 Q	111.70	2nd place, silver medalist(s)
Xu Linxi	Women's K-1	124.55	5 Q	169.17	9	Did not advance	

Kayak cross

Athlete	Event	Preliminary		Quarterfinals	Semifinal	Final	
Athlete	Event	Time	Rank	Position	Position	Position	Rank
Hu Zhaoshan	Men's kayak cross	67.17	1 Q	2 Q	2 Q	3	3rd place, bronze medalist(s)
Quan Xin	Men's kayak cross	69.21	16 Q	1 Q	1 Q	2	2nd place, silver medalist(s)
Chen Lin	Women's kayak cross	77.62	1 Q	1 Q	1 Q	1	1st place, gold medalist(s)
Xu Linxi	Women's kayak cross	86.46	11 Q	1 Q	1 Q	3	3rd place, bronze medalist(s)

=== Sprint ===
China entered 16 athletes into the Games.

Athlete	Event	Heat		Semifinal		Final	
Athlete	Event	Time	Rank	Time	Rank	Time	Rank
Ji Bowen	Men's C-1 500 m	—N/a				1:47.338	1st place, gold medalist(s)
Ji Bowen; Wu Shengyue	Men's C-2 500 m	—N/a				1:40.741	1st place, gold medalist(s)
Chen Weiyang; Ding Shengkai; Liang Fengwei; Wang Jinwei	Men's K-4 500 m	1:23.853	1 FA	Bye		1:22.842	2nd place, silver medalist(s)
Shuai Changwen	Women's C-1 200 m	47.305	1 FA	Bye		46.613	2nd place, silver medalist(s)
Ma Yanan; Sun Mengya	Women's C-2 500 m	1:55.959	1 FA	Bye		1:54.700	1st place, gold medalist(s)
Wang Nan	Women's K-1 500 m	—N/a				1:55.999	1st place, gold medalist(s)
Yin Mengdie; Yu Shimeng	Women's K-2 500 m	1:45.331	1 FA	Bye		1:45.010	1st place, gold medalist(s)
Shen Siyu; Wang Nan; Yin Mengdie; Yu Shimeng	Women's K-4 500 m	—N/a				1:33.784	1st place, gold medalist(s)
Wu Shengyue; Ma Yanan	Mixed C-2 500 m	—N/a				1:48.377	1st place, gold medalist(s)
Li Chenhao; Zhang Luxi	Mixed K-2 500 m	1:40.782	1 FA	Bye		1:39.444	1st place, gold medalist(s)

Qualification Legend: FA = Qualify to final (medal)

== Cricket ==
China entered 15 athletes into the Games.

Summary

Team	Event	Quarterfinal	Semifinal	Final / BM	
Team	Event	Opposition Score	Opposition Score	Opposition Score	Rank
China women's	Women's tournament	Bangladesh; L NR	Did not advance		

=== Women's tournament ===
Squads

- Mingyue Zhu (c)
- Cai Yuzhi
- Chen Xinyu
- Feng Qian
- Gong Yuting
- Hong Yali
- Jiang Chuquin (wk)
- Jiaping Li
- Lyu Yihan
- Ma Ruike
- Wang Huiying
- Wei Haiting
- Wen Sinan
- Xie Wenyan
- Zhao Yihan

Quarterfinals

Quarter-final 1
17 September 2026
07:00
Scorecard

Bangladesh	v	China

Match abandoned
Kōrogi Sports Park, Nisshin
Umpires: Saleema Imtiaz (Pak) and Gayathri Venugopalan (Ind)

- No toss.
- No play was possible due to wet outfield.
- Bangladesh advanced by virtue of being the higher-seeded team.

== Cycling ==
=== Road ===
China entered 7 athletes into the Games.

Athlete	Event	Time	Rank
Qu Chengjun	Men's road race	DNF	
Su Haoyu	Men's road race	4:16:55	5
Yu Yuanfeng	Men's road race	4:30:06	21
Xue Ming	Men's individual time trial	43:21.44	4
Guo Li	Women's road race	2:50:05	1st place, gold medalist(s)
Zhang Hao	Women's road race	2:51:31	4
Zhou Qiuying	Women's road race	3:02:26	30
Zhang Hao	Women's individual time trial	36:28.40	2nd place, silver medalist(s)

=== Track ===
China entered 18 athletes into the Games.

Sprint

Athlete	Event	Qualification		Round 1	Repechage 1	Round 2	Repechage 2	Quarterfinals	Semifinals	Finals / BM	
Athlete	Event	Time Speed (km/h)	Rank	Opposition Time Speed (km/h)	Opposition Time Speed (km/h)	Opposition Time Speed (km/h)	Opposition Time Speed (km/h)	Opposition Time Speed (km/h)	Opposition Time Speed (km/h)	Opposition Time Speed (km/h)	Rank
Li Zhiwei	Men's sprint	9.444	2 Q	Laitonjam (IND); W 10.402; 10.620	Bye	Yung TH (HKG); W 10.475; 11.573	Bye	Kang S-f (TPE); W, W	Awang (MAS); W, W	Ota (JPN); L, L	2nd place, silver medalist(s)
Xie Han	Men's sprint	9.501	4 Q	Yung TH (HKG); W 10.032; 10.714	Bye	Sahrom (MAS); W 10.216; 10.384	Bye	Angsuthasawit (THA); L, W, L	Did not advance		8
Jin Zhiheng; Li Zhiwei; Liu Qi; Xie Han	Men's team sprint	43.691	2 Q	—N/a					India; W 42.348 GR; 44.374	Japan; W 42.152 GR; 42.511	1st place, gold medalist(s)
Jiang Yulu	Women's sprint	10.352	3 Q	Chelobroy (IND); W 11.142; 13.331	Bye	Cho S-y (KOR); W 11.047; 11.735	Bye	Mohd Asri (MAS); W, W			
Yuan Liying	Women's sprint	10.155 GR	1 Q	Bye		Chen C-y (TPE); W 11.589; 12.481	Bye	Ching Y-s (TPE); W, W			
Jiang Yulu; Luo Xuehuang; Yuan Liying; Wang Lijuan	Women's team sprint	46.672	1 Q	—N/a					W 45.825 GR QG	Malaysia; W 45.370 AR; 48.566	1st place, gold medalist(s)

Qualification legend: Q – Qualify to semifinal for gold medal; FA – Gold medal final; FB – Bronze medal final

Keirin

Athlete	Event	Round 1	Repechage	Semifinals	Final
Athlete	Event	Rank	Rank	Rank	Rank
Li Zhiwei	Men's keirin				
Xie Han	Men's keirin				
Wang Lijuan	Women's keirin				
Yuan Liying	Women's keirin				

Qualification legend: Q=Qualified for next round; R=Advanced to repechage

Pursuit

Athlete	Event	Qualification		Semifinals		Final	
Athlete	Event	Time	Rank	Opponent Time	Rank	Opponent Time	Rank
Pei Zhengyu; Sun Haijiao; Sun Wentao; Wu Junjie; Yang Yang	Men's team pursuit	3:52.412	2 Q	Kazakhstan; W 3:49.845; 3:51.589	2 FA	Japan; W 3:47.621 AR; 3:49.005	1st place, gold medalist(s)
Chen Ning; Gong Xianbing; Wang Xiaoyue; Wei Suwan; Yuan Haidi	Women's team pursuit	4:16.766	2 Q	South Korea; W OVL	2 FA	Japan; W 4:08.818 AR; 4:10.424	1st place, gold medalist(s)

Qualification legend: Q – Qualify to semifinal for gold medal; q – Qualify to classification semifinal; FA – Gold medal final; FB – Bronze medal final

Omnium

Athlete	Event	Scratch race		Tempo race		Elimination race		Points race		Total	
Athlete	Event	Points	Rank	Points	Rank	Points	Rank	Points	Rank	Points	Rank
Wu Junjie	Men's omnium	28	7	22	10	28	7	79	1	157	3rd place, bronze medalist(s)
Chen Ning	Women's omnium	34	4	32	5						

Madison

Athlete	Event	Points	Laps	Rank
Sun Haijiao; Wu Junjie; Yang Yang	Men's madison			
Chen Ning; Gong Xianbing; Yuan Haidi	Women's madison	30	10	3rd place, bronze medalist(s)

=== Mountain biking ===
China entered 4 athletes into the Games.

Athlete	Event	Time	Rank
Lü Xianjing	Men's cross-country	1:28:09	7
Yuan Jinwei	Men's cross-country	1:25:15	1st place, gold medalist(s)
Liang Zhenglan	Women's cross-country	1:27:05	2nd place, silver medalist(s)
Wu Zhifan	Women's cross-country	1:26:14	1st place, gold medalist(s)

=== BMX ===
==== Freestyle ====
China entered 4 athletes into the Games.

Athlete	Event	Qualification		Final	
Athlete	Event	Points	Rank	Points	Rank
Liu Xing	Men's freestyle	62.50	5 Q	84.80	4
Sha Xiaolong	Men's freestyle	77.30	3 Q	86.20	3rd place, bronze medalist(s)
Sun Jiaqi	Women's freestyle	83.80	1 Q	90.20	3rd place, bronze medalist(s)
Sun Sibei	Women's freestyle	80.90	2 Q	93.80	1st place, gold medalist(s)

==== Race ====
China entered 4 athletes into the Games.

Athlete	Event	Qualification		Final	
Athlete	Event	Points	Rank	Result	Rank
Chen Yucheng	Men's racing	12	6 Q	33.466	5
Lin Haochao	Men's racing	12	7 Q	32.947	3rd place, bronze medalist(s)
Liao Wanyi	Women's racing	6	4 Q	34.500	2nd place, silver medalist(s)
Wang Mengyao	Women's racing	4	2 Q	REL	

== Diving ==
China entered 12 athletes into the Games.

Men

Athlete	Event	Preliminary		Final	
Athlete	Event	Points	Rank	Points	Rank
Liu Chengzan	1 m springboard	—N/a		361.45	3rd place, bronze medalist(s)
Wang Zongyuan	1 m springboard	—N/a		442.75	1st place, gold medalist(s)
Wang Zongyuan	3 m springboard	498.40	1 Q	494.40	1st place, gold medalist(s)
Zheng Jiuyuan	3 m springboard	436.85	2 Q	419.75	2nd place, silver medalist(s)
Lian Junjie	10 m platform	517.00	1 Q	501.25	1st place, gold medalist(s)
Zhao Renjie	10 m platform	462.85	2 Q	427.50	3rd place, bronze medalist(s)
Wang Zongyuan; Zheng Jiuyuan	3 m synchronized springboard	—N/a		465.87	1st place, gold medalist(s)
Lian Junjie; Yang Hao	10 m synchronized platform	—N/a		465.54	1st place, gold medalist(s)

Women

Athlete	Event	Preliminary		Final	
Athlete	Event	Points	Rank	Points	Rank
Lin Shan	1 m springboard	—N/a		263.05	1st place, gold medalist(s)
Long Yiping	1 m springboard	—N/a		254.25	2nd place, silver medalist(s)
Chen Jia	3 m springboard	347.25	1 Q	347.45	2nd place, silver medalist(s)
Chen Yiwen	3 m springboard	345.60	2 Q	358.05	1st place, gold medalist(s)
Chen Yuxi	10 m platform	396.40	2 Q	432.65	1st place, gold medalist(s)
Lu Wei	10 m platform	400.10	1 Q	385.40	2nd place, silver medalist(s)
Chen Jia; Chen Yiwen	3 m synchronized springboard	—N/a		328.56	1st place, gold medalist(s)
Chen Yuxi; Lu Wei	10 m synchronized platform	—N/a		347.82	1st place, gold medalist(s)

== Equestrian ==
China entered 8 athletes into the Games.

== Esport ==
China entered 23 athletes into the Games.

Athlete	Event	Group stage				Quarterfinal	Semifinal	Final	
Athlete	Event	Opposition Score	Opposition Score	Opposition Score	Rank	Opposition Score	Opposition Score	Opposition Score	Rank
He Weijia; Huang Yaoqin; Meng Jiajun; Wang Ke; Xu Bicheng; Zhao Haoyu	Honor of Kings	Laos; W 2–0	—N/a		1 Q	Indonesia; W 2–0	Philippines; W 2–0	Malaysia; W 4–0	1st place, gold medalist(s)
Chen Mingming; Fan Siqi; Lu Shujia; Lu Yahui; Mu Xinyue; Shi Xiangwei; Sun Le	Identity V	Bye				South Korea; W 2–0	Chinese Taipei; W 2–0	Japan; W 2–0	1st place, gold medalist(s)
Sui Xiangyun; Wang Feng; Wang Tongrong; Tan Xujie; Xu Kunbin	Naraka: Bladepoint	Indonesia; W 2–0	Malaysia; W 2–0	Thailand; W 2–0	1 Q	—N/a	Chinese Taipei; W 3–0	Thailand; W 3–0	1st place, gold medalist(s)

Athlete	Event	Match 1	Match 2	Match 3	Match 4	Match 5	Match 6	Match 7	Match 8	Match 9	Match 10	Match 11	Match 12	Total	Rank
Athlete	Event	Result	Result	Result	Result	Result	Result	Result	Result	Result	Result	Result	Result	Total	Rank
Chen Yumeng; He Jianghong; He Ruibo; Li Haokui; Liu Jinshan	PUBG Mobile	20	15	11	7	5	3	12	5	10	4	5	17	114	2nd place, silver medalist(s)

== Fencing ==
China entered 24 athletes into the Games.

Individual

Athlete	Event	Group stage							Round of 64	Round of 32	Round of 16	Quarterfinal	Semifinal	Final	
Athlete	Event	Opposition Score	Opposition Score	Opposition Score	Opposition Score	Opposition Score	Opposition Score	Rank	Opposition Score	Opposition Score	Opposition Score	Opposition Score	Opposition Score	Opposition Score	Rank
Lan Minghao	Men's épée	Kurbanov (KAZ); L 1–2	Si To (SGP); W 5–1	Ali (BAN); W 5–1	Bautista (PHI); W 5–2	Nguyen (VIE); W 5–4	Askarshozoda (TJK); W 5–1	4 Q	Bye	Batbyamba (MGL); W 15–9	Nguyen (VIE); W 8–8	Prokhodov (KAZ); L 7–15	Did not advance		
Zhang Xinkun	Men's épée	Al-Mane (KUW); W 5–2	Odeh (JOR); W 5–1	Prokhodov (KAZ); L 4–5	Al-Shuaibi (OMA); W 5–3	Jang H-m (KOR); W 5–3	Abed (KSA); W 5–4	7 Q	Bye	Islamov (KGZ); W 15–8	Park S-y (KOR); W 15–13	Yamada (JPN); L 9–15	Did not advance		
Xu Jie	Men's foil	Matsuyama (JPN); L 3–5	Abramkin (KGZ); W 5–0	Mohammad (KUW); W 5–3	Semeneev (UZB); W 5–3	Al-Blooshi (UAE); W 5–0	—N/a	4 Q	—N/a	Keskes (OMA); W 15–3	Semeneev (UZB); L 13–14	Did not advance			
Zeng Zhaoran	Men's foil	Keskes (OMA); W 5–1	Lee K-h (KOR); L 2–5	Poorgharib (QAT); W 5–2	Semyonov (KAZ); W 5–4	Khan (PAK); W 5–0	—N/a	6 Q	—N/a	Perez (PHI); W 15–6	Kravtsov (UZB); L 12–15	Did not advance			
Luo Shaotong	Men's sabre	Abdulkareem (KUW); L 4–5	Villanueva (PHI); W 5–2	Pakdaman (IRI); L 1–5	Ejaz (PAK); W 5–0	Nguyen (VIE); W 5–3	—N/a	10 Q	—N/a	Singh (IND); W 15–14	Kokubo (JPN); L 2–15	Did not advance			
Shen Chenpeng	Men's sabre	Singh (IND); W 5–1	Tahla (JOR); W 5–2	Srinualnad (THA); L 3–5	Tsumori (JPN); L 4–5	—N/a		15 Q	—N/a	Nguyen (VIE); W 15–7	Srinualnad (THA); W 15–6	Kokubo (JPN); W 15–9	Pakdaman (IRI); W 15–9	Oh S-u (KOR); L 13–15	2nd place, silver medalist(s)
Tang Junyao	Women's épée	Khakimova (UZB); L 4–5	Koh (SGP); L 3–4	Larrazabal (PHI); W 5–2	Nguyen (VIE); W 5–0	Chaudhari (IND); W 5–4	—N/a	9 Q	—N/a	Nguyen (VIE); W 15–3	Chan (HKG); W 15–7	Song (KOR); L 14–15	Did not advance		
Yang Jingwen	Women's épée	Terayama (JPN); W 4–3	Gomez (PHI); L 2–5	Mansi (JOR); L 4–5	Andreyeva (KAZ); W 5–3	Keneshova (KGZ); W 5–2	—N/a	14 Q	—N/a	Chaudhari (IND); W 15–14	Hsieh (HKG); W 15–13	Andreyeva (KAZ); W 15–10	Kiria (SGP); L 14–15	Did not advance	3rd place, bronze medalist(s)
Fu Yingying	Women's foil	Al-Blooshi (UAE); W 5–3	Catantan (PHI); W 5–4	Gnoyeva (KAZ); W 5–0	Park J-h (KOR); W 5–0	Kumalaputra (INA); W 5–0	—N/a	1 Q	—N/a	Bye	Ku (MAC); W 15–8	Volobueva (UZB); L 7–15	Did not advance		
Huang Qianqian	Women's foil	Berthier (SGP); W 5–0	Ku (MAC); W 5–3	Kikuchi (JPN); L 2–5	Al-Siyabi (OMA); W 5–0	Stalinraj (IND); W 5–3	—N/a	=3 Q	—N/a	Bye	Wong (SGP); L 10–12	Did not advance			
Pan Qimiao	Women's sabre	Anggraini (INA); W 5–0	Heng (SGP); W 5–3	Emura (JPN); W 5–2	Dalmacio (PHI); L 2–5	Gupta (IND); W 5–3	—N/a	4 Q	—N/a	Bye	Heng (SGP); W 15–9	Sit (HKG); W 15–13	Dayibekova (UZB); L 8–15	Did not advance	3rd place, bronze medalist(s)
Rao Xueyi	Women's sabre	Tugsjargal (MGL); W 5–3	Perdebaeva (UZB); W 5–1	Gulik (KAZ); L 3–5	Lim (SGP); W 5–2	Leung (HKG); W 5–3	—N/a	3 Q	—N/a	Bye	Devi (IND); W 15–5	Jeon H-y (KOR); W 15–11	Emura (JPN); L 11–15	Did not advance	3rd place, bronze medalist(s)

Team

Athlete	Event	Round of 32	Round of 16	Quarterfinal	Semifinal	Final	
Athlete	Event	Opposition Score	Opposition Score	Opposition Score	Opposition Score	Opposition Score	Rank
Lan Minghao; Peng Shengwei; Xiu Yuhan; Zhang Xinkun	Men's team épée	Bye	Mongolia; W 45–19	South Korea; L 36–45	Did not advance		
Lyu Weiqiao; Xu Jie; Zeng Zhaoran	Men's team foil	—N/a	Pakistan; W 45–12	Singapore; W 45–27	Japan; L 43–45	Did not advance	3rd place, bronze medalist(s)
Lin Xiao; Luo Shaotong; Shen Chenpeng; Wei Zhenhao	Men's team sabre	—N/a	Bye	Kazakhstan; L 40–45	Did not advance		
Liu Chang; Tang Junyao; Yang Jingwen; Yu Sihan	Women's team épée	—N/a	Bye	Vietnam; W 45–17	Kazakhstan; W 45–21	South Korea; W 45–28	1st place, gold medalist(s)
Fu Yingying; Song Yue; Zhang Siqi; Huang Qianqian	Women's team foil	—N/a	Bye	Kazakhstan; W 40–36	South Korea; L 35–43	Did not advance	3rd place, bronze medalist(s)
Pan Qimiao; Rao Xueyi; Wei Jiayi; Zhang Xinyi	Women's team sabre	—N/a	Bye	Singapore; W 45–32	South Korea; L 29–45	Did not advance	3rd place, bronze medalist(s)

== Field hockey ==
Summary

Key:

- s.o. – Match decided by penalty-shootout.

Team	Event	Group stage						Semifinal / Cl.	Final / BM / Pl.	
Team	Event	Opposition Score	Opposition Score	Opposition Score	Opposition Score	Opposition Score	Rank	Opposition Score	Opposition Score	Rank
China men's	Men's tournament	Oman; W 2–0	Thailand; W 8–1	Pakistan; L 0–3	Uzbekistan; W 3–1	Malaysia; L 0–5	3 Q	Classification 5–8; Bangladesh; W 7–1	5th place match Japan; L 0–5	6
China women's	Women's tournament	Bangladesh; W 13–0	Chinese Taipei; W 10–0	Malaysia; W 4–0	South Korea; W 3–0	Kazakhstan; W 16–0	1 Q	Japan; D 0–0 (4–2 s.o.)	India; L 0–1	2nd place, silver medalist(s)

=== Men's tournament ===
Team squads

The following is the China roster in the men's field hockey tournament of the 2026 Asian Games.

Head coach: (Australia) Anthony Farry

1. Guan Quyang
2. Chen Qijun
3. Gao Jiesheng
5. Meng Yuanfeng (C)
6. Chen Chongcong (C)
7. Zhang Xiaojia
8. Meng Dihao
11. Chen Benhai
17. Meng Nan
18. Wang Yaqi
20. Su Rui
21. Ao Xu
23. Du Shihao
27. He Yonghua
28. Zhang Jialiang
30. Wang Weihao (GK)
33. Chen Chengfu
66. Lin Changliang
77. Zhao Yulai
99. Zhang Pengyang (GK)

Preliminary round

Pos	Team	Pld	W	D	L	GF	GA	GD	Pts	Qualification
1	Malaysia	5	5	0	0	34	4	+30	15	Semi-finals
2	Pakistan	5	4	0	1	28	8	+20	12	Semi-finals
3	China	5	3	0	2	13	10	+3	9	Fifth place classification
4	Thailand	5	2	0	3	5	28	−23	6	Fifth place classification
5	Uzbekistan	5	1	0	4	6	20	−14	3	Ninth place game
6	Oman	5	0	0	5	4	20	−16	0	Eleventh place game

Source: FIH
Rules for classification: 1) points; 2) matches won; 3) goal difference; 4) goals for; 5) head-to-head result; 6) field goals for.

18 September 2026
09:00

China	2–0	Oman
Gao 23'; Du 35'	Report

Gifu Prefectural Green Stadium
Umpires:
Coen van Bunge (NED)
Sean Rapaport (RSA)

22 September 2026
13:00

Thailand	1–8	China
Chaimanee 53'	Report	Gao 12', 44', 56'; Chen 13'; Zhang 30'; He 40', 52'; Zhao 55'

Gifu Prefectural Green Stadium
Umpires:
Rawi Anbananthan (MAS)
Daulet Urmanov (UZB)

24 September 2026
19:00

China	0–3	Pakistan
	Report	Mahmood 19'; Khan 24'; Shahid 28'

Gifu Prefectural Green Stadium
Umpires:
Hideki Kinoshita (JPN)
Deepak Joshi (IND)

26 September 2026
19:00

Uzbekistan	1–3	China
Abboskhonov 5'	Report	Zhao 10', 36'; Gao 22'

Gifu Prefectural Green Stadium
Umpires:
Rawi Anbananthan (MAS)
Rama Potnis (IND)

28 September 2026
09:00

China	0–5	Malaysia
	Report	Fi. Saari 13'; Anuar 22'; Hamsani 24'; Fa. Saari 43'; Azrai 59'

Gifu Prefectural Green Stadium
Umpires:
Lim Hong-Zhen (SGP)
Mohammad Shahbaz Ali (BAN)

Crossover

1 October 2026
14:00

China	7–1	Bangladesh
Zhang 2', 44'; Yulai 4'; Chen 24', 56', 59'; Gao 32'	Report	Hasan 30'

Gifu Prefectural Green Stadium
Umpires:
Coen van Bunge (NED)
Hideki Kinoshita (JPN)

Fifth place match

3 October 2026
14:00

Japan	5–0	China
Matsumoto 21'; Kawabe 21', 60'; Ooka 48'; Yamasaki 60'	Report

Gifu Prefectural Green Stadium
Umpires:
James Unkles (AUS)
You Hyo-sik (KOR)

=== Women's tournament ===
Team squads

The following is the China roster in the women's field hockey tournament of the 2026 Asian Games.

Head coach: (Australia) Alyson Annan

3. Yang Liu
6. Zhang Ying
7. Chen Yi
9. Ma Ning
10. Zhong Jiaqi
11. Dan Wen
13. Li Hong
16. Ou Zixia (C)
17. Peng Yang
18. Zou Meirong
20. He Jiangxin
23. Fan Yunxia
26. Chen Yang
29. Liu Ping (GK)
35. Tan Jinzhuang
36. Liu Chencheng
50. Li Ting (GK)
53. Chen Tong
58. Yu Anhui
64. Luo Yaxi

Preliminary round

Pos	Team	Pld	W	D	L	GF	GA	GD	Pts	Qualification
1	China	5	5	0	0	46	0	+46	15	Semi-finals
2	South Korea	5	4	0	1	20	5	+15	12	Semi-finals
3	Malaysia	5	3	0	2	14	7	+7	9	Fifth place classification
4	Chinese Taipei	5	2	0	3	8	21	−13	6	Fifth place classification
5	Bangladesh	5	0	1	4	6	30	−24	1	Ninth place game
6	Kazakhstan	5	0	1	4	4	35	−31	1	Eleventh place game

Source: FIH
Rules for classification: 1) points; 2) matches won; 3) goal difference; 4) goals for; 5) head-to-head result; 6) field goals for.

20 September 2026
09:00

China	13–0	Bangladesh
Zhong 4', 13', 29'; Chen Ya. 12', 18'; Li H. 13'; Zhang 27'; Ma 32'; Yang 36'; Zou 38', 51'; Chen Yi 41', 57'	Report

Gifu Prefectural Green Stadium
Umpires:
Cookie Tan (SGP)
Shahiela Johari (MAS)

21 September 2026
11:00

China	10–0	Chinese Taipei
Chen Yi 7', 32', 32'; Zhong 23', 34'; Zhang 39'; Ma 54'; Fan 55'; Chen Ya. 57'; Yu 58'	Report

Gifu Prefectural Green Stadium
Umpires:
Rama Potnis (IND)
Laurine Delforge (BEL)

23 September 2026
19:00

Malaysia	0–4	China
	Report	Yu 2'; Zhong 25', 44'; Zhang 47'

Gifu Prefectural Green Stadium
Umpires:
Daulet Urmanov (KAZ)
Aleisha Neumann (AUS)

25 September 2026
13:00

South Korea	0–3	China
	Report	Zhang 40'; Liu 46'; Chen Ya. 60'

Gifu Prefectural Green Stadium
Umpires:
Cookie Tan (SGP)
Laurine Delforge (BEL)

27 September 2026
09:00

China	16–0	Kazakhstan
Yu 8', 28', 29'; Chen Ya. 16'; Zhang 23', 24', 24'; Zhong 23', 27'; Dan 44', 49'; Chen Yi 51', 59'; Li H. 56'; Zou 57'; Fan 58'	Report

Gifu Prefectural Green Stadium
Umpires:
Emi Yamada (JPN)
Binish Hayat (PAK)

Semi-final

30 September 2026
16:30

China	0–0	Japan
	Report; SO Report
Penalties
Li (penalty shoot-out missed); Liu (penalty shoot-out scored); Ma (penalty shoot-out scored); Dan (penalty shoot-out scored); He (penalty shoot-out scored)	4–2	(penalty shoot-out scored) Murayama; (penalty shoot-out missed) Kobayakawa; (penalty shoot-out missed) Nakagomi; (penalty shoot-out scored) Hasegawa

Gifu Prefectural Green Stadium
Umpires:
Laurine Delforge (BEL)
Kim Yoon-seon (KOR)

Gold medal match

2 October 2026
20:00

China	0–1	India
	Report	Lalremsiami 10'

Gifu Prefectural Green Stadium
Umpires:
Kim Yoon-seon (KOR)
Laurine Delforge (BEL)

== Football ==
Summary

Team	Event	Group stage				Quarterfinal	Semifinal	Final / BM	
Team	Event	Opposition Score	Opposition Score	Opposition Score	Rank	Opposition Score	Opposition Score	Opposition Score	Rank
China men's	Men's tournament	North Korea; W 2–1	Iran; D 0–0	United Arab Emirates; D 0–0	1 Q	Thailand; W 3–0	South Korea; L 1–2	Uzbekistan; D 2–2 (PSO4-3)	3rd place, bronze medalist(s)
China women's	Women's tournament	Hong Kong; W 5–1	Uzbekistan; D 1–1	Philippines; W 5–1	1 Q	Vietnam; W 1–0	North Korea; L 0–2	South Korea; L 0–1	4

=== Men's tournament ===
Team squads

China announced their 24-man preliminary squad on 1 September. The final squad was announced on 11 September.

Head coach: (Spain) Antonio Puche

No.	Pos.	Player	Date of birth (age)	Caps	Goals	Club
1	GK	Yu Jinyong	6 July 2004 (aged 22)	6	0	(Chinese Football Association) Shandong Taishan
2	DF	Hu Hetao	5 October 2003 (aged 22)	16	0	(Chinese Football Association) Chengdu Rongcheng
3	DF	Liu Haofan	23 October 2003 (aged 22)	13	0	(Chinese Football Association) Zhejiang FC
4	DF	Shi Songchen	30 December 2005 (aged 20)	2	0	(Chinese Football Association) Shandong Taishan
5	DF	Zhu Chenjie*	23 August 2000 (aged 26)	10	0	(Chinese Football Association) Shanghai Shenhua
6	MF	Xu Bin	2 May 2004 (aged 22)	11	0	(The Football Association) Wolverhampton Wanderers
7	FW	Xiang Yuwang	18 December 2003 (aged 22)	12	4	(Chinese Football Association) Chongqing Tonglianglong
8	MF	Li Xinxiang	30 November 2005 (aged 20)	0	0	(Chinese Football Association) Shanghai Port
9	FW	Zhang Yuning*	5 January 1997 (aged 29)	12	7	(Chinese Football Association) Beijing Guoan
10	FW	Wang Yudong	23 November 2006 (aged 19)	14	4	(Chinese Football Association) Zhejiang FC
11	MF	Kuai Jiwen	28 February 2006 (aged 20)	10	1	(Chinese Football Association) Shanghai Port
12	GK	Yao Haoyang	28 October 2006 (aged 19)	0	0	(Chinese Football Association) Chongqing Tonglianglong
13	MF	Mutellip Iminqari	2 May 2004 (aged 22)	12	0	(Chinese Football Association) Chengdu Rongcheng
14	MF	Imran Memet	3 May 2005 (aged 21)	0	0	(Chinese Football Association) Shandong Taishan
15	MF	Wu Xi* (captain)	19 February 1989 (aged 37)	4	1	(Chinese Football Association) Shanghai Shenhua
16	GK	Li Hao	6 March 2004 (aged 22)	9	0	(Chinese Football Association) Qingdao West Coast
17	DF	He Yiran	27 February 2005 (aged 21)	10	0	(Chinese Football Association) Chengdu Rongcheng
18	MF	Chen Zeshi	21 February 2005 (aged 21)	7	0	(Chinese Football Association) Shandong Taishan
19	FW	Behram Abduweli	8 March 2003 (aged 23)	17	4	(Chinese Football Association) Chengdu Rongcheng
20	MF	Yang Haoyu	25 May 2006 (aged 20)	12	0	(Chinese Football Association) Shanghai Shenhua
21	DF	Peng Xiao	28 July 2005 (aged 21)	12	2	(Chinese Football Association) Shandong Taishan
22	MF	Mao Weijie	28 May 2005 (aged 21)	8	0	(Chinese Football Association) Dalian Yingbo
23	DF	Alex Yang	13 June 2005 (aged 21)	8	0	(Chinese Football Association) Shanghai Port

* Over-aged player.

Group play

Pos	Team	Pld	W	D	L	GF	GA	GD	Pts	Qualification
1	China	3	1	2	0	2	1	+1	5	Advance to knockout stage
2	North Korea	3	1	1	1	5	3	+2	4	Advance to knockout stage
3	Iran	3	1	1	1	4	5	−1	4	
4	United Arab Emirates	3	0	2	1	1	3	−2	2	

Source: Aichi–Nagoya 26
Rules for classification: Group stage tiebreakers
16 September 2026
19:00

China	2–1	North Korea
Zhang Yuning 44'; Wu Xi 68'	Report	Choe Kuk 27'

Wave Stadium Kariya, Kariya
Attendance: 1,185
Referee: Meder Taichiev (Kyrgyzstan)

20 September 2026
14:00

Iran	0–0	China
	Report

Wave Stadium Kariya, Kariya
Attendance: 934
Referee: Firdavs Nosafarov (Uzbekistan)

23 September 2026
14:30

China	0–0	United Arab Emirates
	Report

Toyota Stadium, Toyota
Attendance: 7,501
Referee: Ahmad A'Qashah (Singapore)

Quarterfinals

26 September 2026
15:00

China	3–0	Thailand
Sangtong 45+2' (o.g.); Hu Hetao 47'; Zhang Yuning 63'	Report

Toyota Stadium, Toyota
Attendance: 7,587
Referee: Hiroki Kasahara (Japan)

Semifinals

30 September 2026
15:00

South Korea	2–1	China
Lee Young-jun 33'; Bae Jun-ho 82'	Report	Wang Yudong 22'

Nagai Stadium, Osaka
Attendance: 4,470
Referee: Sadullo Gulmurodi (Tajikistan)

Bronze medal game

3 October 2026
15:00

(bronze) China	2–2	Uzbekistan
Hu Hetao 15'; Wang Yudong 53'	Report	Bakhromov 42'; Shodiboev 89'
Penalties
Liu Haofan (penalty missed); Zhu Chenjie (penalty scored); Xiang Yuwang (penalty scored); Imran Memet (penalty scored); Peng Xiao (penalty scored)	4–3	(penalty missed) Reimov; (penalty scored) Murtazaev; (penalty missed) Shodiboev; (penalty scored) Ormonjonov; (penalty scored) Bakhromov

Toyota Stadium, Toyota
Attendance: 13,770
Referee: Tuan Yaasin (Malaysia)

=== Women's tournament ===
Team squads

The following players list is the China squad for the 2026 Asian Games.

Head Coach: (Australia) Ante Milicic

No.	Pos.	Player	Date of birth (age)	Club
1	GK	Pan Hongyan	30 December 2004 (age 21)	(Chinese Football Association) Beijing
12	GK	Xiao Zitong	27 March 2002 (age 24)	(Chinese Football Association) Shanghai
22	GK	Zhu Mengdi	25 January 2000 (age 26)	(Chinese Football Association) Shanxi
2	DF	Yu Fan	4 July 2000 (age 26)	(Chinese Football Association) Beijing
3	DF	Chen Qiaozhu	8 September 1999 (age 27)	(Chinese Football Association) Beijing
4	DF	Si Yu	18 March 2000 (age 26)	(Chinese Football Association) Beijing
5	DF	Wu Haiyan	26 February 1993 (age 33)	(Chinese Football Association) Wuhan
8	DF	Yao Wei	1 September 1997 (age 29)	(Chinese Football Association) Wuhan
13	DF	Wang Ying	18 November 1997 (age 28)	(Chinese Football Association) Guangdong
20	DF	Zhang Chengxue	2 December 1995 (age 30)	(Chinese Football Association) Sichuan
7	MF	Wang Shuang	23 January 1995 (age 31)	(Chinese Football Association) Wuhan
10	MF	Wang Yanwen	27 March 1999 (age 27)	(Chinese Football Association) Beijing
14	MF	Li Qingtong	14 April 1999 (age 27)	(Chinese Football Association) Beijing
15	MF	Wang Aifang	15 January 2006 (age 20)	(Chinese Football Association) Liaoning
16	MF	Liu Jing	28 April 1998 (age 28)	(Chinese Football Association) Changchun
18	MF	Zhang Rui	17 January 1989 (age 37)	(Chinese Football Association) Shandong
19	MF	Zhang Linyan	16 January 2001 (age 25)	(Chinese Football Association) Beijing
21	MF	Sun Fangxin	6 July 2003 (age 23)	(Chinese Football Association) Guangxi
6	FW	Yuan Cong	17 April 2000 (age 26)	(Chinese Football Association) Guangdong
9	FW	Wurigumula	26 August 1996 (age 30)	(Chinese Football Association) Sichuan
11	FW	Zhou Xinyu	26 February 2002 (age 24)	(Chinese Football Association) Liaoning
17	FW	Xie Zongmei	26 April 2006 (age 20)	(Chinese Football Association) Liaoning
23	FW	Shao Ziqin	24 February 2003 (age 23)	(Portuguese Football Federation) Benfica

Group play

Pos	Team	Pld	W	D	L	GF	GA	GD	Pts	Qualification
1	China	3	2	1	0	11	3	+8	7	Advance to knockout stage
2	Uzbekistan	3	1	2	0	4	3	+1	5	Advance to knockout stage
3	Philippines	3	1	1	1	4	6	−2	4	Advance to knockout stage
4	Hong Kong	3	0	0	3	2	9	−7	0	

Source: Aichi–Nagoya 26
Rules for classification: Group stage tiebreakers
14 September 2026
19:00

China	5–1	Hong Kong
Chen Qiaozhu 14'; Si Yu 38'; Wang Yanwen 48'; Wang Shuang 80', 89'	Report	Cheung Wai Ki 31'

Gifu Nagaragawa Stadium, Gifu
Attendance: 179
Referee: Khin Nyein Chan (Myanmar)

17 September 2026
14:00

Uzbekistan	1–1	China
Dadaboeva 42'	Report	Zhang Linyan 70'

Gifu Nagaragawa Stadium, Gifu
Attendance: 226
Referee: Azusa Sugino (Japan)

21 September 2026
16:00

China	5–1	Philippines
Wang Yanwen 20', 40', 54'; Chen Qiaozhu 49'; Yuan Cong 90+2'	Report	Leach 65'

Gifu Nagaragawa Stadium, Gifu
Attendance: 1,022
Referee: Esraa Almbaiden (Jordan)

Quarterfinals

25 September 2026
15:00

China	1–0 (a.e.t.)	Vietnam
Wang Shuang 109'	Report

Nagai Stadium, Osaka
Attendance: 252
Referee: Azusa Sugino (Japan)

Semifinals

29 September 2026
15:00

North Korea	2–0	China
Yao Wei 53' (o.g.); Myong Yu-jong 79'	Report

Shizuoka Stadium, Fukuroi
Attendance: 564
Referee: Veronika Bernatskaia (Kyrgyzstan)

Bronze medal game

2 October 2026
15:00

China	0–1	South Korea (bronze)
	Report	Noh Jin-young 4'

Shizuoka Stadium, Fukuroi
Attendance: 1,331
Referee: Rawdha Al-Mansoori (United Arab Emirates)

== Golf ==
China entered 6 athletes into the Games.

Athlete	Event	Round 1	Round 2	Round 3	Round 4	Total		
Athlete	Event	Score	Score	Score	Score	Score	Par	Rank
Ding Wenyi	Men's individual	67	64	70	64	265	-15	4
Jin Zihao	Men's individual	70	68	68	66	272	-8	=8
Zheng Yunhe	Men's individual	66	68	69	73	276	-4	14
Ding Wenyi; Jin Zihao; Zheng Yunhe	Men's team	133	132	137	130	532	-27	1st place, gold medalist(s)
Liu Yan	Women's individual	71	66	71	66	274	-6	=5
Yin Ruoning	Women's individual	67	66	66	67	266	-14	2nd place, silver medalist(s)
Zhang Weiwei	Women's individual	69	69	72	74	284	+4	=19
Liu Yan; Yin Ruoning; Zhang Weiwei	Women's team	136	132	137	133	538	-16	1st place, gold medalist(s)

== Gymnastics ==
=== Artistic ===
China entered 10 athletes into the Games.

Men
Team

Athlete	Event	Qualification								Final							
Athlete	Event	Apparatus						Total	Rank	Apparatus						Total	Rank
Athlete	Event	F	PH	R	V	PB	HB	Total	Rank	F	PH	R	V	PB	HB	Total	Rank
Lan Xingyu	Team	12.266	—N/a	15.200	14.133	14.266	~~12.400~~	—N/a				15.200	14.266	14.133	—N/a	—N/a	
Zou Jingyuan	Team	—N/a	14.200	14.266	—N/a	15.333	—N/a					14.233	—N/a	15.400	—N/a	—N/a	
Sun Wei	Team	13.900	14.200	~~13.766~~	14.166	~~13.333~~	13.933	—N/a		13.566	14.000	—N/a	14.400	—N/a	12.500	—N/a	
Tian Hao	Team	~~12.233~~	~~13.900~~	—N/a	~~DNS~~	—N/a	14.433	—N/a		13.966	14.000	—N/a			14.400	—N/a	
Zhang Boheng	Team	13.800	14.166	14.233	14.133	14.700	14.033	—N/a		13.833	13.433	14.666	14.733	14.166	14.200	—N/a	
Total	Team	39.966	42.566	43.699	42.432	44.299	42.399	255.361	1 Q	41.365	41.433	44.099	43.399	43.699	41.100	255.095	1st place, gold medalist(s)

Individual finals

Athlete	Event	Qualification								Final							
Athlete	Event	Apparatus						Total	Rank	Apparatus						Total	Rank
Athlete	Event	F	PH	R	V	PB	HB	Total	Rank	F	PH	R	V	PB	HB	Total	Rank
Lan Xingyu	Rings	—N/a		15.200	—N/a			15.200	1 Q	—N/a		14.933	—N/a			14.933	1st place, gold medalist(s)
Lan Xingyu	Parallel bars	—N/a				14.266	—N/a	14.266	7 Q	—N/a				13.766	—N/a	13.766	5
Zou Jingyuan	Rings	—N/a		14.266	—N/a			14.266	3 Q	—N/a		14.600	—N/a			14.600	3rd place, bronze medalist(s)
Zou Jingyuan	Parallel bars	—N/a				15.333	—N/a	15.333	1 Q	—N/a				15.500	—N/a	15.500	1st place, gold medalist(s)
Sun Wei	All-around	—N/a								See team results						83.298	4
Sun Wei	Floor	13.900	—N/a					13.900	5 Q	10.566	—N/a					10.566	8
Tian Hao	Horizontal bar	—N/a					14.433	14.433	1 Q	—N/a					14.700	14.700	1st place, gold medalist(s)
Zhang Boheng	All-around	—N/a								See team results						85.065	1st place, gold medalist(s)

Women
Team

Athlete	Event	Qualification						Final					
Athlete	Event	Apparatus				Total	Rank	Apparatus				Total	Rank
Athlete	Event	V	UB	BB	F	Total	Rank	V	UB	BB	F	Total	Rank
Du Siyu	Team	13.800	~~12.633~~	—N/a				13.666	14.866	—N/a		—N/a	
Ke Qinqin	Team	14.033	14.100	13.700	13.366	—N/a		12.366	—N/a	14.400	13.133	—N/a	
Zhang Qingying	Team	13.233	14.266	13.933	13.300	—N/a			14.033	15.066	13.066	—N/a	
Zhang Yihan	Team	—N/a		~~11.500~~	13.200	—N/a		13.700	—N/a		13.333	—N/a	
Qiu Qiyuan	Team	~~12.600~~	13.933	14.833	~~13.033~~	—N/a			14.033	14.800	—N/a	—N/a	
Total	Team	41.066	42.299	42.466	39.866	165.697	2 Q	39.732	42.932	44.266	39.532	166.462	1st place, gold medalist(s)

Individual finals

Athlete	Event	Qualification						Final					
Athlete	Event	Apparatus				Total	Rank	Apparatus				Total	Rank
Athlete	Event	V	UB	BB	F	Total	Rank	V	UB	BB	F	Total	Rank
Du Siyu	Vault	13.433	—N/a			13.433	3 Q	13.450	—N/a			13.450	3rd place, bronze medalist(s)
Ke Qinqin	All-around	—N/a						See team results				55.199	2nd place, silver medalist(s)
Ke Qinqin	Floor	—N/a			13.366	13.366	3 Q	—N/a			12.033	12.033	8
Zhang Qingying	All-around	—N/a						See team results				54.732	4
Zhang Qingying	Uneven bars	—N/a	14.266	—N/a		14.266	2 Q	—N/a	14.233	—N/a		14.233	3rd place, bronze medalist(s)
Zhang Qingying	Balance beam	—N/a		13.933	—N/a	13.933	6 Q	—N/a		13.700	—N/a	13.700	5
Zhang Yihan	Floor	—N/a			13.200	13.200	6 Q	—N/a			13.566	13.566	3rd place, bronze medalist(s)
Qiu Qiyuan	Uneven bars	—N/a	13.933	—N/a		13.933	6 Q	—N/a	15.100	—N/a		15.100	1st place, gold medalist(s)
Qiu Qiyuan	Balance beam	—N/a		14.833	—N/a	14.833	1 Q	—N/a		14.566	—N/a	14.566	2nd place, silver medalist(s)

=== Rhythmic ===
China entered 7 athletes into the Games.

Athlete	Event	Qualification						Final					
Athlete	Event	Hoop	Ball	Clubs	Ribbon	Total	Rank	Hoop	Ball	Clubs	Ribbon	Total	Rank
Wang Qi	Individual	27.600	26.500	28.650	26.400	109.15	2 Q	28.550	26.250	28.950	26.300	110.05	2nd place, silver medalist(s)
Wang Zilu	Individual	25.750	27.300	26.250	25.100	104.40	7 Q	28.350	26.650	28.000	26.200	109.20	3rd place, bronze medalist(s)

Athletes	Event	Qualification				Final			
Athletes	Event	5 apps	3+2 apps	Total	Rank	5 apps.	3+2 apps	Total	Rank
Ding Xinyi; Liu Miaoting; Pu Yanzhu; Wang Lanjing; Zhang Xinyi	Group	26.500	26.500	53.000	2 Q	27.550	27.750	55.300	1st place, gold medalist(s)

=== Trampoline ===
China entered 4 athletes into the Games.

Athlete	Event	Qualification		Final		Super Final	
Athlete	Event	Score	Rank	Score	Rank	Score	Rank
Wang Zisai	Men's	65.15	1 Q	63.57	1 Q	63.83	2nd place, silver medalist(s)
Yan Langyu	Men's	59.88	3 Q	61.27	2 Q	65.09	1st place, gold medalist(s)
Qiu Zheng	Women's	55.38	4 Q	55.65	1 Q	56.58	3rd place, bronze medalist(s)
Zhu Xueying	Women's	56.90	1 Q	6.54	8	Did not advance	

== Handball ==
Summary

Team	Event	Group stage							Quarterfinal	Semifinal	Final / BM	
Team	Event	Opposition Score	Opposition Score	Opposition Score	Opposition Score	Opposition Score	Opposition Score	Rank	Opposition Score	Opposition Score	Opposition Score	Rank
China men's	Men's tournament	Japan; L 27–31	Qatar; L 25–30	Hong Kong; W 38–26	—N/a			3 Q	South Korea; L 26–32	Did not advance		
China women's	Women's tournament	Kazakhstan; W 34–24	Uzbekistan; W 37–14	Japan; L 27–33	South Korea; L 17–37	Hong Kong; W 37–19	Vietnam; W 37–27	—N/a				3rd place, bronze medalist(s)

=== Men's tournament ===
Team rosters

- Zhao Kai (1)
- Zhang Tianjin (2)
- Li Xiangjie (3)
- Wang Xiaofeng (5)
- Zhou Ao (7)
- Xie Qinglong (8)
- Chen Xu (9)
- Zhang Jianjie (10)
- Chen Minghao (21)
- Song Ziyang (15)
- He Xinian (16)
- Hu Jinming (17)
- Sun Fangwei (19)
- Rao Yuanyuan (26)
- Li Shuo (23)
- Wang Hao (29)

Group play

Pos	Team	Pld	W	D	L	GF	GA	GD	Pts	Qualification
1	Qatar	3	3	0	0	107	70	+37	6	Quarterfinals
2	Japan (H)	3	2	0	1	103	81	+22	4	Quarterfinals
3	China	3	1	0	2	90	87	+3	2	Quarterfinals
4	Hong Kong	3	0	0	3	60	122	−62	0	Quarterfinals

Source: asiangames2026.org
(H) Hosts

20 September 2026; 15:00	China	27–31	Japan	Toyoda Gosei Memorial Gymnasium; Referees: Al-Wahibi, Al-Shahi (OMA)
20 September 2026; 15:00	Sun, Xie 5	(12–16)	Sugioka 8	Toyoda Gosei Memorial Gymnasium; Referees: Al-Wahibi, Al-Shahi (OMA)
20 September 2026; 15:00	1× (yellow card) 6× (suspension)	Report	1× (yellow card) 2× (suspension)	Toyoda Gosei Memorial Gymnasium; Referees: Al-Wahibi, Al-Shahi (OMA)

21 September 2026; 19:30	China	25–30	Qatar	Toyoda Gosei Memorial Gymnasium; Referees: Pak, Cha (KOR)
21 September 2026; 19:30	Sun 6	(15–15)	Marzo 8	Toyoda Gosei Memorial Gymnasium; Referees: Pak, Cha (KOR)
21 September 2026; 19:30	1× (yellow card) 7× (suspension) 5× (red card)	Report	1× (yellow card) 6× (suspension)	Toyoda Gosei Memorial Gymnasium; Referees: Pak, Cha (KOR)

23 September 2026; 15:00	China	38–26	Hong Kong	Toyoda Gosei Memorial Gymnasium; Referees: Al-Enezi, Al-Naseem (KUW)
23 September 2026; 15:00	Song 7	(20–12)	Kan Y.M., Lin 6	Toyoda Gosei Memorial Gymnasium; Referees: Al-Enezi, Al-Naseem (KUW)
23 September 2026; 15:00	4× (suspension) 1× (red card)	Report	1× (yellow card)	Toyoda Gosei Memorial Gymnasium; Referees: Al-Enezi, Al-Naseem (KUW)

Quarterfinals

26 September 2026; 14:00	South Korea	32–26	China	Kasugai City Gymnasium; Referees: Ismoilov, Ismoilov (UZB)
26 September 2026; 14:00	Kim R., Park S. 6	(16–12)	Li 7	Kasugai City Gymnasium; Referees: Ismoilov, Ismoilov (UZB)
26 September 2026; 14:00	3× (suspension)	Report	1× (suspension)	Kasugai City Gymnasium; Referees: Ismoilov, Ismoilov (UZB)

=== Women's tournament ===
Team rosters

- Lu Chang (1)
- Pan Fengying (3)
- Liang Jing (8)
- Jiang Xintong (9)
- Shi Zihan (10)
- Liu Chan (11)
- Li Xiaoqing (12)
- Yang Yue (15)
- Xuang Sitong (16)
- Hou Changqing (20)
- Zhang Pingping (21)
- Yuan Lingjie (22)
- Qu Wenna (24)
- Liu Xuedan (28)
- Zheng Yun (36)
- Liu Yuting (53)

Group play

Pos	Team	Pld	W	D	L	GF	GA	GD	Pts
1st place, gold medalist(s)	South Korea	6	6	0	0	243	105	+138	12
2nd place, silver medalist(s)	Japan (H)	6	5	0	1	217	120	+97	10
3rd place, bronze medalist(s)	China	6	4	0	2	189	154	+35	8
4	Kazakhstan	6	3	0	3	164	187	−23	6
5	Uzbekistan	6	2	0	4	116	206	−90	4
6	Hong Kong	6	1	0	5	131	209	−78	2
7	Vietnam	6	0	0	6	128	207	−79	0

Source: asiangames2026.org
(H) Hosts

19 September 2026; 10:00	Kazakhstan	24–34	China	Kasugai City Gymnasium; Referees: Lee, Lee (KOR)
19 September 2026; 10:00	Khassakhanova 9	(12–17)	Liu C. 4	Kasugai City Gymnasium; Referees: Lee, Lee (KOR)
19 September 2026; 10:00	2× (suspension)	Report	1× (yellow card) 2× (suspension)	Kasugai City Gymnasium; Referees: Lee, Lee (KOR)

22 September 2026; 17:30	Uzbekistan	14–37	China	Kasugai City Gymnasium; Referees: Gheisarian, Gheisarian (IRI)
22 September 2026; 17:30	Saparbaeva 4	(6–18)	Liang 7	Kasugai City Gymnasium; Referees: Gheisarian, Gheisarian (IRI)
22 September 2026; 17:30	2× (suspension)	Report	4× (suspension)	Kasugai City Gymnasium; Referees: Gheisarian, Gheisarian (IRI)

23 September 2026; 17:30	China	27–33	Japan	Kasugai City Gymnasium; Referees: Mohamed, Al-Aradi (BHR)
23 September 2026; 17:30	Liu C. 9	(16–18)	Aizawa 6	Kasugai City Gymnasium; Referees: Mohamed, Al-Aradi (BHR)
23 September 2026; 17:30	1× (yellow card) 3× (suspension)	Report	1× (suspension)	Kasugai City Gymnasium; Referees: Mohamed, Al-Aradi (BHR)

25 September 2026; 17:30	South Korea	37–17	China	Toyoda Gosei Memorial Gymnasium; Referees: Al-Enezi, Al-Naseem (KUW)
25 September 2026; 17:30	Kwon, Lee Y. 5	(19–8)	Liu X. 5	Toyoda Gosei Memorial Gymnasium; Referees: Al-Enezi, Al-Naseem (KUW)
25 September 2026; 17:30	3× (suspension)	Report	5× (suspension)	Toyoda Gosei Memorial Gymnasium; Referees: Al-Enezi, Al-Naseem (KUW)

26 September 2026; 15:00	China	37–19	Hong Kong	Toyoda Gosei Memorial Gymnasium; Referees: Razakbergenova, Allayarova (UZB)
26 September 2026; 15:00	Shi 8	(19–11)	Chong 4	Toyoda Gosei Memorial Gymnasium; Referees: Razakbergenova, Allayarova (UZB)
26 September 2026; 15:00	2× (suspension)	Report	2× (suspension)	Toyoda Gosei Memorial Gymnasium; Referees: Razakbergenova, Allayarova (UZB)

27 September 2026; 15:30	China	37–27	Vietnam	Toyoda Gosei Memorial Gymnasium; Referees: Razakbergenova, Allayarova (UZB)
27 September 2026; 15:30	Qu 7	(17–13)	Nguyễn T.A. 10	Toyoda Gosei Memorial Gymnasium; Referees: Razakbergenova, Allayarova (UZB)
27 September 2026; 15:30		Report		Toyoda Gosei Memorial Gymnasium; Referees: Razakbergenova, Allayarova (UZB)

== Judo ==
China entered 13 athletes into the Games.

Athlete	Event	Round of 32	Round of 16	Quarterfinal	Semifinal	Repechage	Final / BM	
Athlete	Event	Opposition Result	Opposition Result	Opposition Result	Opposition Result	Opposition Result	Opposition Result	Rank
Ma Yulin	Men's −60 kg	Bye	Kanatbek Uulu (KGZ); W 102–000	Kondo (JPN); L 000–101	Did not advance	Poltoratskii (BHR); W 100–000	Yang (TPE); W 010–000	3rd place, bronze medalist(s)
Xue Ziyang	Men's −66 kg	Bye	Rohman (INA); W 100–000	Nutfulloev (UZB); L 000–011	Did not advance	Lin (TPE); W 002–001	Kyrgyzbayev (KAZ); W 001–000	3rd place, bronze medalist(s)
Lin Gaohui	Men's −73 kg	—N/a	Lkhamaa (MGL); L 000–100	Did not advance				
Shi Zhenyu	Men's −81 kg	Bye	Oyunchimeg (MGL); L 000–001	Did not advance				
Han Qi	Men's −90 kg	—N/a	Wei (THA); W 102–000	Kim J-h (KOR); L 000–011	Did not advance	Jugdergarav (MGL); W 010–000	Murtozoev (UZB); W 100–000	3rd place, bronze medalist(s)
Huang Fuchun	Men's −100 kg	—N/a	Bye	Han J-y (KOR); L 000–001	Did not advance	Poltushev (KGZ); W 100–010	Sarsenbaev (UZB); L 001–100	5
Li Haiyang	Men's +100 kg	—N/a	Bye	Magomedomarov (UAE); L 000–001	Did not advance	Zholdoshkaziev (KGZ); L 000–102	Did not advance	
Xu Aoyu	Women's −52 kg	—N/a	Tsui (HKG); W 001–000	Jang S-y (KOR); L 000–100	Did not advance	Lam (VIE); W 110–000	Bayanmönkhiin (MGL); W 010–000	3rd place, bronze medalist(s)
Tao Yuying	Women's −57 kg	—N/a	Khakkhah (IRI); W 100–000	Huh M-m (KOR); L 000–100	Did not advance	Abdirova (KAZ); L 000–001	Did not advance	
Zhang Wen	Women's −63 kg	—N/a	Yuan (TPE); W 011–000	Tanioka (JPN); L 000–001	Did not advance	Kim J-s (KOR); L 000–110	Did not advance	
Tang Jing	Women's −70 kg	—N/a	Slayman (LAO); W 101–000	Maeda (JPN); L DSQ	Did not advance	Takhellambam (IND); L DSQ	Did not advance	
Wu Hongtao	Women's −78 kg	—N/a	Bye	Barbat (IRI); L 000–101	Did not advance	Kodirova (UZB); W 100–000	Chayeb (LBN); L 000–100	5
Niu Xinran	Women's +78 kg	—N/a	Bye	Chang (TPE); W 101–000	Amarsaikhany (MGL); W 001–000	Bye	Lee H-j (KOR); W 101–001	1st place, gold medalist(s)
Xue Ziyang; Lin Gaohui; Shi Zhenyu; Han Qi; Huang Fuchun; Li Haiyang; Xu Aoyu; Tao Yuying; Zhang Wen; Tang Jing; Wu Hongtao; Niu Xinran	Team	—N/a	Bye	South Korea; L 1–4	Did not advance	Kyrgyzstan; W 4–1	Mongolia; W 4–2	3rd place, bronze medalist(s)

== Karate ==
China entered 2 athletes into the Games.

Athlete	Event	Round of 16	Quarterfinal	Semifinal	Repechage	Final / BM	
Athlete	Event	Opposition Result	Opposition Result	Opposition Result	Opposition Result	Opposition Result	Rank
Gong Li	Women's −61 kg	Shimada (JPN); W 6–2	Adnan (MAS); W 8–1	An J-e (KOR); W 8–0	Bye	Kanay (KAZ); W 8–2	1st place, gold medalist(s)
Li Qiaoqiao	Women's −68 kg	—N/a	Nguyen (VIE); W 4–1	Kama (JPN); W 7–4	Bye	Al-Drous (JOR); W 4–3	1st place, gold medalist(s)

== Modern pentathlon ==
China entered 8 athletes into the Games.

Athlete	Event	Fencing ranking round (épée one touch)		Semi-finals													Final												
Athlete	Event	Fencing ranking round (épée one touch)		Fencing		Obstacles			Swimming (100 m freestyle)			Laser-run (10 m laser pistol / 3000 m cross-country)			Total points	Final rank	Fencing		Obstacles			Swimming			Laser-run			Total points	Final rank
Athlete	Event	V–D	Rank	Rank	MP points	Time	Rank	MP points	Time	Rank	MP points	Time	Rank	MP points	Total points	Final rank	Rank	MP points	Time	Rank	MP points	Time	Rank	MP points	Time	Rank	MP points	Total points	Final rank
Chen Bailang	Men's	22–13	7	5	230	0:22.78	3	377	0:57.74	8	312	11:52.52	12	588	1507	7 Q	10	216	00:21.98	3	380	00:54.85	3	326	11:12.53	12	628	1550	10
Li Liuchang	Men's	16–19	23	8	224	0:22.86	3	377	0:55.58	2	323	11:27.98	1	613	1537	1 Q	196	18	00:22.96	8	377	00:54.17	2	330	10:05.13	1	695	1598	1st place, gold medalist(s)
Luo Shuai	Men's	21–14	10	6	228	0:24.77	7	371	0:58.20	10	309	11:15.55	2	625	1533	3 Q	228	6	00:24.32	9	373	00:57.89	14	311	10:20.83	4	680	1592	4
Ma Yuang	Men's	27–8	3	2	244	0:21.00	2	382	0:56.91	9	316	11:46.01	2	594	1536	2 Q	4	236	00:20.75	2	383	00:55.36	5	324	11:05.12	10	635	1578	6
Fu Jing	Women's	22–10	6	3	238	0:27.62	1	363	1:04.13	6	280	13:36.04	11	484	1365	1 Q	9	218	0:27.39	1	363	1:00.51	3	298	13:10.66	16	510	1389	8
Meng Xin	Women's	20–12	8	5	230	0:30.23	2	355	1:06.20	8	269	13:09.90	6	511	1365	4 Q	6	228	0:29.29	5	358	1:01.86	9	291	12:46.61	10	534	1411	5
Wu Xiyao	Women's	22–10	5	5	230	0:29.02	1	358	1:04.19	5	280	13:40.47	12	480	1348	6 Q	5	230	0:28.74	2	359	1:00.87	5	296	12:18.16	7	562	1447	3rd place, bronze medalist(s)
Zhang Mingyu	Women's	24–8	3	3	238	0:32.53	3	348	1:04.84	7	276	13:09.98	7	511	1373	4 Q	4	236	0:30.83	7	353	1:00.85	4	296	12:05.11	5	575	1460	2nd place, silver medalist(s)

Team

Athlete	Event	Fencing	Obstacle	Swimming	Laser Run	Total	Rank
Li Liuchang; Luo Shuai; Ma Yuang	Men	660	1133	965	2010	4768	2nd place, silver medalist(s)
Zhang Mingyu; Wu Xiyao; Meng Xin	Women	694	1070	883	1671	4318	1st place, gold medalist(s)

== Rowing ==
China entered 26 athletes into the Games.

Athlete	Event	Heat		Final	
Athlete	Event	Time	Rank	Time	Rank
Deng Zhiwei	Men's single sculls	6:45.22	1 FA	6:38.98	1st place, gold medalist(s)
Cao Chuang; Yang Mengshuai	Men's pair	6:22.01	2 FA	6:27.22	2nd place, silver medalist(s)
Yi Xudi; Nie Yide	Men's double sculls	6:13.36	1 FA	6:09.77	1st place, gold medalist(s)
Bian Shihao; Li Chun; Li Zepeng; Shao Zhiqiang	Men's four	6:11.60	1 FA	5:49.75	1st place, gold medalist(s)
Mu Xiaolong; Ou Zhiwei; Xue Hao; Zhang Xiuli	Men's quadruple sculls	6:17.26	1 FA	5:46.03	1st place, gold medalist(s)
Zhang Xinyu	Women's single sculls	8:00.01	1 FA	7:21.53	1st place, gold medalist(s)
Ren Wanning; Zhu Hongshan	Women's pair	7:42.54	1 FA	7:06.76	1st place, gold medalist(s)
Wang Sixuan; Shen Shuangmei	Women's double sculls	7:17.90	1 FA	6:45.99	1st place, gold medalist(s)
Li Duolei; Liu Yaqi; Zhang Shuxian; Zhang Yangjing	Women's four	6:27.37	1 FA	6:34.87	1st place, gold medalist(s)
Han Mengyao; Jiao Siyu; Li Yan; Xu Yixi	Women's quadruple sculls	6:16.96	1 FA	6:23.53	1st place, gold medalist(s)

Qualification Legend: FA = Qualify to final (medal)

== Rugby sevens ==
Summary

Team	Event	Pool round				Quarterfinal	Semifinal	Final / BM	
Team	Event	Opposition Score	Opposition Score	Opposition Score	Rank	Opposition Score	Opposition Score	Opposition Score	Rank
China men's	Men's tournament	Malaysia; W 33–21	Uzbekistan; W 50–0	Hong Kong; L 0–22	2 Q	Sri Lanka; W 19–12	Japan; W 10–7	Hong Kong; L 0–26	2nd place, silver medalist(s)
China women's	Women's tournament	Malaysia; W 43–0	India; W 43–5	Hong Kong; W 24–10	1 Q	—N/a	Thailand; W 28–0	Japan; L 5–10	2nd place, silver medalist(s)

=== Men's tournament ===
Group play

Pos	Team	Pld	W	D	L	PF	PA	PD	Pts	Qualification
1	Hong Kong	3	3	0	0	115	0	+115	9	Quarter-finals
2	China	3	2	0	1	83	43	+40	7	Quarter-finals
3	Malaysia	3	1	0	2	43	81	−38	5	Quarter-finals
4	Uzbekistan	3	0	0	3	0	117	−117	3	

First match(es) will be played: 1 October 2026. Source:

1 October 2026
9:00

China	33–21	Malaysia
Try: Huang 4' m Ma 6' c Shan (2) 6' c, 14' c Xing 11' c Con: Shan (4/5)	Report	Try: Sudin 2' c Mohamad 8' c Nor Herman 13' c Con: Mat Zizi (3/3)

Paloma Mizuho Rugby Stadium
Referee: Koki Yamauchi (Japan)

1 October 2026
15:15

China	50–0	Uzbekistan
Try: Xing 2' c Ma 5' m Li X. (2) 6' c, 7' c Wang B. 9' m Yao 11' c Li Zhi. 12' c Shan 14+'; Con: Shan (5/7)	Report

Paloma Mizuho Rugby Stadium
Referee: Morgan White (Hong Kong)

2 October 2026
9:25

Hong Kong	22–0	China
Try: Bourron 2' m Herbert 7+' m Sayers 11' c Lee 14' m Con: Phillips (1/3); Rickard (0/1)	Report

Paloma Mizuho Rugby Stadium
Referee: Koki Yamauchi (Japan)

Quarterfinals

2 October 2026
15:15

Sri Lanka	12–19	China
Try: Ekanayake (2) 7+' m, 14+' c Con: Rankothgedara (0/1); Ibrahim (1/1)	Report	Try: Shan (2) 2' c, 6' c Wang B. 11' m Con: Shan (2/3)

Paloma Mizuho Rugby Stadium
Referee: Leow Wei Liang (Singapore)

Semifinals

3 October 2026
12:45

China	10–7	Japan
Try: Ma 2' m Li Zhu. 7' m Con: Shan (0/2)	Report	Try: Shiwachi 4' c Con: Shiwachi (1/1)

Paloma Mizuho Rugby Stadium
Referee: Craig Chan (Hong Kong)

Gold medal game

3 October 2026
19:10

Hong Kong	26–0	China
Try: Sayers (2) 4' c, 5' c Phillips 7+' c Mba Oyana 8' m Con: Phillips (3/4)	Report

Paloma Mizuho Rugby Stadium
Referee: Leow Wei Liang (Singapore)

=== Women's tournament ===
Group play

Pos	Team	Pld	W	D	L	PF	PA	PD	Pts	Qualification
1	China	3	3	0	0	110	15	+95	9	Semi-finals
2	Hong Kong	3	2	0	1	79	43	+36	7	Semi-finals
3	India	3	1	0	2	38	81	−43	5	5–8th place semi-finals
4	Malaysia	3	0	0	3	17	105	−88	3	5–8th place semi-finals

1 October 2026
12:45

China	43–0	Malaysia
Try: Zheng 2' c Dou (2) 5' c, 13' m Sun 7' c Chen Z. 8' m Gao 10' c Chen K. 11' m Con: Zheng (1/2); Sun (3/3); Chen K. (0/2)	Report

Paloma Mizuho Rugby Stadium
Referee: Sunny Lee (Hong Kong)

1 October 2026
19:00

China	43–5	India
Try: Chen C. (2) 3' c, 9' m Dou 5' c Chen K. 7' m Wang W. 11' c Zhang 13' m Gao 14' c Con: Chen K. (2/4); Dou (1/1); Zheng (1/2)	Report	Try: Kumari 2' m Con: Hansdah (0/1)

Paloma Mizuho Rugby Stadium
Referee: Christabelle Mee Lim (Singapore)

2 October 2026
12:45

China	24–10	Hong Kong
Try: Chen C. (2) 2' c, 3' m Dou (2) 7+' c, 10' m Con: Chen K. (2/4)	Report	Try: Chong 4' m Au 14' m Con: Chan S. (0/1); Ho (0/1)

Paloma Mizuho Rugby Stadium
Referee: Hibiki Ikeda (Japan)

Semifinals

3 October 2026
11:30

China	28–0	Thailand
Try: Chen C. 7' c Chen K. 9' c Gao 12' c Sun 14' c Con: Chen K. (3/3); Sun (1/1)	Report

Paloma Mizuho Rugby Stadium
Referee: Hibiki Ikeda (Japan)

Gold medal game

3 October 2026
18:40

China	5–10	Japan
Try: Zhang 13' m Con: Chen K. (0/1)	Report	Try: Hirano 6' m Kajiki 7' m Con: Suda (0/2)

Paloma Mizuho Rugby Stadium
Referee: Sunny Lee (Hong Kong)

== Sailing ==
China entered 10 athletes into the Games.

== Shooting ==
China entered 30 athletes into the Games.

=== Men ===
Individual

Athlete	Event	Qualification		Final	
Athlete	Event	Points	Rank	Points	Rank
Bu Shuaihang	10 m air pistol	583-21x	2 Q	222.1	3rd place, bronze medalist(s)
Hu Kai	10 m air pistol	582-23x	5 Q	243	2nd place, silver medalist(s)
Xie Yu	10 m air pistol	578-26x	12	Did not advance	
He Shiyu	25 m rapid fire pistol	576-14x	10	Did not advance	
Su Lianbofan	25 m rapid fire pistol	592-24x GR	1 Q	32 GR	2nd place, silver medalist(s)
Yang Yuhao	25 m rapid fire pistol	572-15x	12	Did not advance	
Ma Sihan	10 m air rifle	633.0	2 Q	187.2	5
Sheng Lihao	10 m air rifle	635.4 AR	1 Q	254.2 AR	1st place, gold medalist(s)
Sheng Lihao	50 m rifle 3 position	585-27x	7	Did not advance	
Zhang Changhong	10 m air rifle	630.6	5	Did not advance	
Zhang Changhong	50 m rifle 3 position	593-34x GR	1 Q	360.2	2nd place, silver medalist(s)
Liu Yukun	50 m rifle 3 position	588-34x	5 Q	360.5 GR	1st place, gold medalist(s)
He Weidong	Trap	107	33	Did not advance	
Qi Ying	Trap	122	2 Q	20	3rd place, bronze medalist(s)
Yu Haicheng	Trap	113	19	Did not advance	
Lyu Jianlin	Skeet	120	1 Q	33	2nd place, silver medalist(s)
Wan Antao	Skeet	117	10	Did not advance	

Team

Athlete	Event	Final	
Athlete	Event	Points	Rank
Bu Shuaihang; Hu Kai; Xie Yu	10 m air pistol	1743-70x	1st place, gold medalist(s)
He Shiyu; Su Lianbofan; Yang Yuhao	25 m rapid fire pistol	1740-53x	2nd place, silver medalist(s)
Ma Sihan; Sheng Lihao; Zhang Changhong	10 m air rifle	1899.0 WR	1st place, gold medalist(s)
Liu Yukun; Sheng Lihao; Zhang Changhong	50 m rifle 3 position	1766-95x	1st place, gold medalist(s)
He Weidong; Qi Ying; Yu Haicheng	Trap	342	4

=== Women ===
Individual

Athlete	Event	Qualification		Final	
Athlete	Event	Points	Rank	Points	Rank
Jiang Ranxin	10 m air pistol	580-22x	2 Q	221.6	3rd place, bronze medalist(s)
Shen Yiyao	10 m air pistol	579-17x	4 Q	241.3	2nd place, silver medalist(s)
Yao Qianxun	10 m air pistol	576-17x	7	Did not advance	
Yao Qianxun	25 m pistol	576-19x	15	Did not advance	
Shang Kaiyan	25 m pistol	581-23x	6 Q	21	5
Xiao Jiaruixuan	25 m pistol	586-26x	2 Q	38 GR	1st place, gold medalist(s)
Du Yuchen	10 m air rifle	633.6	6	Did not advance	
Han Jiayu	10 m air rifle	633.8	5 Q	145.2	7
Han Jiayu	50 m rifle 3 position	594-33x GR	1 Q	359.0 GR	1st place, gold medalist(s)
Wang Zifei	10 m air rifle	636.8 AR	1 Q	188.2	5
Wang Zifei	50 m rifle 3 position	588-34x	4	Did not advance	
Zhang Liyuan	50 m rifle 3 position	591-38x	2 Q	358.8	2nd place, silver medalist(s)
Liu Shanshan	Trap	113	7	Did not advance	
Sun Yunong	Trap	116	4 Q	26	2nd place, silver medalist(s)
Zhu Jingyu	Trap	117	3 Q	13	5
Che Yufei	Skeet	122	1 Q	9	7
Jiang Chaoyu	Skeet	117	3	Did not advance	
Jiang Yiting	Skeet	118	2 Q	35	1st place, gold medalist(s)

Team

Athlete	Event	Final	
Athlete	Event	Points	Rank
Jiang Ranxin; Shen Yiyao; Yao Qianxun	10 m air pistol	1735-56x	1st place, gold medalist(s)
Shang Kaiyan; Xiao Jiaruixuan; Yao Qianxun	25 m pistol	1743-68x	1st place, gold medalist(s)
Du Yuchen; Han Jiayu; Wang Zifei	10 m air rifle	1904.2 WR	1st place, gold medalist(s)
Han Jiayu; Wang Zifei; Zhang Liyuan	50 m rifle 3 position	1773-105x GR	1st place, gold medalist(s)
Liu Shanshan; Sun Yunong; Zhu Jingyu	Trap	346	1st place, gold medalist(s)
Che Yufei; Jiang Chaoyu; Jiang Yiting	Skeet	357 GR	1st place, gold medalist(s)

=== Mixed ===
Team

Athlete	Event	Qualification		Final	
Athlete	Event	Points	Rank	Points	Rank
Bu Shuaihang; Shen Yiyao	10 m air pistol	577-14x	7	Did not advance	
Sheng Lihao; Wang Zifei	10 m air rifle	638.9 WR	1 Q	507.1 WR	1st place, gold medalist(s)
Qi Ying; Sun Yunong	Trap	142 GR	1 Q	23	3rd place, bronze medalist(s)
Lyu Jianlin; Jiang Yiting	Skeet	140	3 Q	52 WR	1st place, gold medalist(s)

== Skateboarding ==
China entered 8 athletes into the Games.

Athlete	Event	Qualification		Final	
Athlete	Event	Score	Rank	Score	Rank
Chen Ye	Men's park	75.48	6 Q	49.12	8
Wu Bowen	Men's park	50.04	10	Did not advance	
Chen Yuxuan	Men's street	32.57	16	Did not advance	
Lin Honghao	Men's street	121.41	5 Q	46.38	8
Cao Shiqi	Women's park	73.49	5 Q	81.23	4
Meng Lingyan	Women's park	72.53	6 Q	63.69	6
Cui Chenxi	Women's street	131.42	3 Q	156.60	3rd place, bronze medalist(s)
Zhu Yuanling	Women's street	128.03	5 Q	166.57	1st place, gold medalist(s)

== Softball ==
China entered 17 athletes into the Games.

Summary

Team	Event	Preliminary round								Final / BM	
Team	Event	Opposition Score	Opposition Score	Opposition Score	Opposition Score	Opposition Score	Opposition Score	Opposition Score	Rank	Opposition Score	Rank
China women's	Women's tournament	Singapore; W 13–0	South Korea; W 8–4	Thailand; W 15–0	Chinese Taipei; W 5–4	Hong Kong; W 12–2	Philippines; W 7–0	Japan; L 6–7	2 Q	Japan; L 0–7	2nd place, silver medalist(s)

Group play

Pos	Team	Pld	W	L	RF	RA	PCT	GB	Qualification
1	Japan (H)	7	7	0	69	8	1.000	—	Gold medal
2	China	7	6	1	66	17	.857	1	Gold medal
3	Chinese Taipei	7	5	2	68	17	.714	2	Bronze medal
4	Philippines	7	4	3	34	33	.571	3	Bronze medal
5	South Korea	7	3	4	31	36	.429	4	
6	Hong Kong	7	2	5	20	60	.286	5	
7	Singapore	7	1	6	15	57	.143	6	
8	Thailand	7	0	7	7	82	.000	7	

Updated to match(es) played on 2026-10-02. Source: asiangames2026.org
(H) Hosts

26 September; 9:00	China	13–0	Singapore	Anjō Sports Park Softball Ground, Anjō; Umpires: Ayaka Sasajima (JPN)
26 September; 9:00	WP: Wei Yuchen	Boxscore	LP: Koh Rui Wen Adelia	Anjō Sports Park Softball Ground, Anjō; Umpires: Ayaka Sasajima (JPN)

Team	1	2	3	4	5	6	7	R	H	E
China	2	1	0	10	—	—	—	13	14	0
Singapore	0	0	0	0	—	—	—	0	2	1

27 September; 9:00	South Korea	4–8	China	Anjō Sports Park Softball Ground, Anjō; Umpires: Leonardo Belgar (PHI)
27 September; 9:00	LP: Park Min-kyeong	Boxscore	WP: Chai Yinan	Anjō Sports Park Softball Ground, Anjō; Umpires: Leonardo Belgar (PHI)

Team	1	2	3	4	5	6	7	R	H	E
South Korea	0	0	1	0	1	0	2	4	6	0
China	0	1	0	3	4	0	X	8	12	2

28 September; 12:30	South Korea	3–7	Philippines	Anjō Sports Park Softball Ground, Anjō; Umpires: Pan Chih Ming (TPE)
28 September; 12:30	LP: Choe Yeon-ji	Boxscore	WP: Glory Alonzo	Anjō Sports Park Softball Ground, Anjō; Umpires: Pan Chih Ming (TPE)

Team	1	2	3	4	5	6	7	R	H	E
South Korea	0	0	0	3	0	0	0	3	8	1
Philippines	0	0	0	0	0	7	X	7	10	0

30 September; 10:00	Chinese Taipei	4–5	China	Anjō Sports Park Softball Ground, Anjō; Umpires: Mari Jinno (JPN)
30 September; 10:00	LP: Ke Hsia-ai	Boxscore	WP: Chai Yinan	Anjō Sports Park Softball Ground, Anjō; Umpires: Mari Jinno (JPN)

Team	1	2	3	4	5	6	7	R	H	E
Chinese Taipei	0	0	0	0	4	0	0	4	6	0
China	1	0	0	4	0	0	X	5	10	0

30 September; 16:45	China	12–2	Hong Kong	Anjō Sports Park Softball Ground, Anjō; Umpires: Kim Hyung-suk (KOR)
30 September; 16:45	WP: Wei Yuchen	Boxscore	LP: Lam Tin Sum Tina	Anjō Sports Park Softball Ground, Anjō; Umpires: Kim Hyung-suk (KOR)

Team	1	2	3	4	5	6	7	R	H	E
China	6	1	0	4	1	—	—	12	19	0
Hong Kong	0	2	0	0	0	—	—	2	5	0

1 October; 11:20	Philippines	0–7	China	Anjō Sports Park Softball Ground, Anjō; Umpires: Ayaka Sasajima (JPN)
1 October; 11:20	LP: Glory Alonzo	Boxscore	WP: Chai Yinan	Anjō Sports Park Softball Ground, Anjō; Umpires: Ayaka Sasajima (JPN)

Team	1	2	3	4	5	6	7	R	H	E
Philippines	0	0	0	0	0	—	—	0	2	0
China	0	1	2	0	4	—	—	7	8	1

2 October; 15:15	China	6–7	Japan	Anjō Sports Park Softball Ground, Anjō; Umpires: Foo Lai Meng (SGP)
2 October; 15:15	LP: Sun Yue	Boxscore	WP: Yukiko Ueno	Anjō Sports Park Softball Ground, Anjō; Umpires: Foo Lai Meng (SGP)

Team	1	2	3	4	5	6	7	R	H	E
China	0	1	2	0	2	1	0	6	11	0
Japan	2	2	0	2	0	0	1	7	7	0

Gold medal game

3 October; 14:00	China	0–7	Japan	Anjō Sports Park Softball Ground, Anjō; Umpires: Kim Hyung-suk (KOR)
3 October; 14:00	LP: Chai Yinan	Boxscore	WP: Miu Goto	Anjō Sports Park Softball Ground, Anjō; Umpires: Kim Hyung-suk (KOR)

Team	1	2	3	4	5	6	7	R	H	E
China	0	0	0	0	0	—	—	0	2	1
Japan	0	2	0	3	2	—	—	7	9	0

== Sport climbing ==
China entered 8 athletes into the Games.

Boulder & lead

Athlete	Event	Semifinal		Final	
Athlete	Event	Result	Rank	Result	Rank
Hu Junzhe	Men's boulder	59.5	7 Q	29.7	6
Pan Yufei	Men's boulder	84.1	3 Q	30.0	4
Luo Zhilu	Women's boulder	85.0	4 Q	70.0	4
Zhang Yuetong	Women's boulder	85.0	3 Q	85.0	1st place, gold medalist(s)
Hu Junzhe	Men's lead	28	6 Q	28+	6
Pan Yufei	Men's lead	23	=7 Q	38	4
Luo Zhilu	Women's lead	38+	8 Q	35	6
Zhang Yuetong	Women's lead	51	4 Q	39+	3rd place, bronze medalist(s)

Speed

Athlete	Event	Qualification		Quarterfinal		Semifinal		Final	
Athlete	Event	Time	Rank	Time	Rank	Time	Rank	Time	Rank
Chu Shouhong	Men's speed 4	4.67	3 Q	4.88	1 Q	Q		4.71	1st place, gold medalist(s)
Long Jianguo	Men's speed 4	4.64	2 Q	4.96	1 Q	FS		Did not advance	
Deng Lijuan	Women's speed 4	6.23 GR	1 Q	6.522	1 Q	6.32	1 Q	6.064	2nd place, silver medalist(s)
Zhou Yafei	Women's speed 4	6.44	4 Q	6.49	1 Q	6.42	2 Q	FS	

== Squash ==
China entered 8 athletes into the Games.

Individual

Athlete	Event	Round of 64	Round of 32	Round of 16	Quarterfinal	Semifinal	Final	
Athlete	Event	Opposition Result	Opposition Result	Opposition Result	Opposition Result	Opposition Result	Opposition Result	Rank
Du Shaoqian	Men's singles	Bye	Al-Tamimi (KUW); L 2–3	Did not advance				
Zhou Penglin	Men's singles	Bye	Al-Nasfan (KSA); L 0–3	Did not advance				
Liu Ziyi	Women's singles	—N/a	Sinaly (SRI); L 2–3	Did not advance				
Yin Ziyuan	Women's singles	—N/a	Ho (HKG); L 0–3	Did not advance				
Li Haizhen; Zhang Yuning	Mixed doubles	—N/a	Danzanjamts / Khasbaatar (MGL); W 2–0	Chandaran / Arnold (MAS); L 0–2	Did not advance			
Shi Yuxi; Cheng Linglu	Mixed doubles	—N/a	Reyes / Dalida (PHI); L 0–2	Did not advance				

Team

Athlete	Event	Group stage				Play-ins			Quarterfinal	Semifinal	Final	
Athlete	Event	Opposition Score	Opposition Score	Opposition Score	Rank	Opposition Score	Opposition Score	Rank	Opposition Score	Opposition Score	Opposition Score	Rank
Du Shaoqian; Li Haizhen; Shi Yuxi; Zhou Penglin	Men's	India; L 0–3	South Korea; L 0–3	—N/a	3	—N/a			Did not advance			
Cheng Linglu; Liu Ziyi; Yin Ziyuan; Zhang Yuning	Women's	India; L 1–2	Iran; W 2–1	Japan; L 0–3	3 Q	Macau; W 2–1	Pakistan; W 2–1	1 Q	Hong Kong; L 0–2	Did not advance		

== Surfing ==
China entered 4 athletes into the Games.

Athlete	Event	Round 1		Round 2	Round 3	Quarterfinal	Semifinal	Final / BM	
Athlete	Event	Score	Rank	Opposition Result	Opposition Result	Opposition Result	Opposition Result	Opposition Result	Rank
Ma Wensong	Men's shortboard	7.43	2 R2	Dirany (LBN); W 15.10–4.96	Anbarasu (IND); L 8.80–9.76	Did not advance			
Wu Shidong	Men's shortboard	9.93	1 R3	Bye	Nashid (MDV); W 10.93–8.44	Ariyana (INA); L 11.66–12.67	Did not advance		
Jin Shuhan	Women's shortboard	7.73	1 R3	Bye	Heuer (INA); L 9.80–12.53	Did not advance			
Yang Siqi	Women's shortboard	9.76	1 R3	Bye	Im S-j (KOR); W 11.00–8.63	Higgs (THA); W 15.80–10.84	Nonaka (JPN); W 13.83–8.84	Ikeda (JPN); L 7.57–11.64	2nd place, silver medalist(s)

Qualification legend: R3 – Qualifies to elimination rounds; R2 – Qualifies to repechage round

== Swimming ==
China entered 40 athletes into the Games.

Men

Athlete	Event	Heat		Final	
Athlete	Event	Time	Rank	Time	Rank
Chen Hao	50 m freestyle	22.29	7 Q	22.04	4
Wang Changhao	50 m freestyle	22.44	11	Did not advance	
Pan Zhanle	100 m freestyle	48.07	1 Q	47.61	1st place, gold medalist(s)
Zhang Zhanshuo	100 m freestyle	48.66	6 Q	48.23	4
Xu Haibo	200 m freestyle	1:48.84	6 Q	1:46.88	4
Zhang Zhanshuo	200 m freestyle	1:48.68	5 Q	1:43.49 AS	1st place, gold medalist(s)
Fei Liwei	400 m freestyle	3:52.33	3 Q	3:45.78	3rd place, bronze medalist(s)
Zhang Zhanshuo	400 m freestyle	3:51.10	1 Q	3:41.28 GR	1st place, gold medalist(s)
Fei Liwei	800 m freestyle	—N/a		7:53.28	6
Zhang Zhanshuo	800 m freestyle	—N/a		7:42.49 GR	1st place, gold medalist(s)
Fei Liwei	1500 m freestyle	—N/a		15:03.55	6
Zhang Zhanshuo	1500 m freestyle	—N/a		14:42.42	1st place, gold medalist(s)
Wang Zicheng	50 m backstroke	24.80	3 Q	24.49	2nd place, silver medalist(s)
Xu Jiayu	50 m backstroke	24.64	1 Q	24.04 GR	1st place, gold medalist(s)
Jiang Chenglin	100 m backstroke	54.96	7 Q	54.53	5
Xu Jiayu	100 m backstroke	52.63	1 Q	51.98 GR	1st place, gold medalist(s)
Song Borui	200 m backstroke	1:59.59	3 Q	1:56.89	4
Xu Jiayu	200 m backstroke	2:01.78	8 Q	1:56.73	3rd place, bronze medalist(s)
Liu Junjie	50 m breaststroke	27.08	3 Q	26.99	2nd place, silver medalist(s)
Qin Haiyang	50 m breaststroke	26.87	1 Q	26.68	1st place, gold medalist(s)
Dong Zhihao	100 m breaststroke	1:00.28	6 Q	58.64	1st place, gold medalist(s)
Qin Haiyang	100 m breaststroke	1:00.13	3 Q	59.01	3rd place, bronze medalist(s)
Wang Junteng	200 m breaststroke	2:12.41	6 Q	2:10.61	6
Yu Zongda	200 m breaststroke	2:13.59	12	Did not advance	
Wang Changhao	50 m butterfly	23.63	=6 Q	23.25	3rd place, bronze medalist(s)
Xu Fang	50 m butterfly	23.43	3 Q	23.32	4
Wang Xizhe	100 m butterfly	52.15	3 Q	51.87	6
Xu Fang	100 m butterfly	52.01	1 Q	50.73	2nd place, silver medalist(s)
Wang Xizhe	200 m butterfly	1:59.28	1 Q	1:55.95	4
Xu Fang	200 m butterfly	2:01.03	7 Q	1:55.65	2nd place, silver medalist(s)
Wang Shun	200 m individual medley	2:00.04	3 Q	1:57.14	3rd place, bronze medalist(s)
Xie Yichen	200 m individual medley	2:01.72	10	1:59.74	5
Gu Enyi	400 m individual medley	4:23.23	5 Q	4:16.02	4
Wang Shun	400 m individual medley	4:23.17	4 Q	4:14.59	3rd place, bronze medalist(s)
Pan Zhanle; Wang Haoyu; Zhang Zhanshuo; Zhao Jiayue; Xu Haibo^{h} Xu Fang^{h}	4 × 100 m freestyle relay	3:18.76	1 Q	3:10.60 AS	1st place, gold medalist(s)
Fei Liwei; Pan Zhanle; Xu Haibo; Zhang Zhanshuo; Wang Haoyu^{h} Wang Shun^{h} Zhao Jiayue^{h}	4 × 200 m freestyle relay	7:11.70	1 Q	7:00.17 AS	1st place, gold medalist(s)
Dong Zhihao; Pan Zhanle; Xu Fang; Xu Jiayu; Jiang Chenglin^{h} Qin Haiyang^{h} Wang Xizhe^{h} Zhang Zhanshuo^{h}	4 × 100 m medley relay	3:36.56	2 Q	3:27.89	1st place, gold medalist(s)

Women

Athlete	Event	Heat		Final	
Athlete	Event	Time	Rank	Time	Rank
Cheng Yujie	50 m freestyle	24.95	4 Q	24.46	3rd place, bronze medalist(s)
Wu Qingfeng	50 m freestyle	24.33	1 Q	23.98 GR	1st place, gold medalist(s)
Cheng Yujie	100 m freestyle	54.50	3 Q	53.47	3rd place, bronze medalist(s)
Yu Yiting	100 m freestyle	54.61	4 Q	53.21	2nd place, silver medalist(s)
Li Jiaping	200 m freestyle	1:58.50	1 Q	1:56.58	2nd place, silver medalist(s)
Liu Yaxin	200 m freestyle	2:01.40	5 Q	1:57.53	3rd place, bronze medalist(s)
Li Bingjie	400 m freestyle	4:11.38	3 Q	4:02.71	1st place, gold medalist(s)
Yang Peiqi	400 m freestyle	4:11.02	2 Q	4:07.63	4
Li Bingjie	800 m freestyle	—N/a		8:24.02	1st place, gold medalist(s)
Yang Peiqi	800 m freestyle	—N/a		8:36.66	4
Gao Weizhong	1500 m freestyle	—N/a		16:37.00	5
Li Bingjie	1500 m freestyle	—N/a		15:53.52	1st place, gold medalist(s)
Wan Letian	50 m backstroke	27.66	1 Q	27.47	1st place, gold medalist(s)
Wang Xueer	50 m backstroke	28.15	3 Q	27.66	2nd place, silver medalist(s)
Li Wanwei	100 m backstroke	1:01.31	6 Q	1:00.20	4
Peng Xuwei	100 m backstroke	59.86	1 Q	59.30	1st place, gold medalist(s)
Peng Xuwei	200 m backstroke	2:09.38	1 Q	2:05.77 AS	1st place, gold medalist(s)
Sun Mingxia	200 m backstroke	2:11.69	4 Q	2:08.65	2nd place, silver medalist(s)
Tang Qianting	50 m breaststroke	29.50 GR	1 Q	29.45 GR	1st place, gold medalist(s)
Yang Chang	50 m breaststroke	30.56	3 Q	30.24	3rd place, bronze medalist(s)
Tang Qianting	100 m breaststroke	1:07.04	2 Q	1:04.98 GR	1st place, gold medalist(s)
Yang Chang	100 m breaststroke	1:07.92	4 Q	1:06.80	4
Lyu Qinyao	200 m breaststroke	2:33.66	11	Did not advance	
Zhu Leiju	200 m breaststroke	2:27.46	4 Q	2:25.51	3rd place, bronze medalist(s)
Wu Qingfeng	50 m butterfly	26.00	3 Q	25.62	2nd place, silver medalist(s)
Zhang Yufei	50 m butterfly	25.57	1 Q	25.41	1st place, gold medalist(s)
Yu Yiting	100 m butterfly	58.38	3 Q	56.41	1st place, gold medalist(s)
Zhang Yufei	100 m butterfly	57.31	1 Q	56.44	2nd place, silver medalist(s)
Chang Mohan	200 m butterfly	2:10.67	2 Q	2:08.44	2nd place, silver medalist(s)
Yu Zidi	200 m butterfly	2:07.97	1 Q	2:05.08 GR	1st place, gold medalist(s)
Yu Yiting	200 m individual medley	2:11.59	1 Q	2:07.99	2nd place, silver medalist(s)
Yu Zidi	200 m individual medley	2:12.10	2 Q	2:06.10 AS	1st place, gold medalist(s)
Ke Wenxi	400 m individual medley	4:43.12	3 Q	4:32.51	2nd place, silver medalist(s)
Yu Zidi	400 m individual medley	4:39.43	1 Q	4:28.56 GR	1st place, gold medalist(s)
Cheng Yujie; Wu Qingfeng; Yu Yiting; Zhang Yufei; Fan Yaqi^{h} Li Bingjie^{h} Li Jiaping^{h} Liu Yaxin^{h}	4 × 100 m freestyle relay	3:37.70	1 Q	3:33.10 GR	1st place, gold medalist(s)
Li Bingjie; Li Jiaping; Liu Yaxin; Yu Yiting; Cheng Yujie^{h} Fan Yaqi^{h} Gao Weizhong^{h} Yang Peiqi^{h}	4 × 200 m freestyle relay	8:09.90	2 Q	7:49.37	1st place, gold medalist(s)
Peng Xuwei; Tang Qianting; Yu Yiting; Zhang Yufei; Cheng Yujie^{h} Li Wanwei^{h} Yang Chang^{h}	4 × 100 m medley relay	3:59.79	1 Q	3:54.55 GR	1st place, gold medalist(s)

Mixed

Athlete	Event	Heat		Final	
Athlete	Event	Time	Rank	Time	Rank
Dong Zhihao; Xu Jiayu; Yu Yiting; Zhang Yufei; Cheng Yujie^{h} Li Wanwei^{h} Qin Haiyang^{h} Xu Fang^{h}	4 × 100 m medley relay	3:49.48	1 Q	3:40.38	1st place, gold medalist(s)

^{h} Swimmers who participated in the heats only.

== Table tennis ==
China entered 5 male and 5 female players into the Games.

Men

Athlete	Event	Round of 64	Round of 32	Round of 16	Quarterfinal	Semifinal	Final / BM	
Athlete	Event	Opposition Result	Opposition Result	Opposition Result	Opposition Result	Opposition Result	Opposition Result	Rank
Lin Shidong	Singles	Bye	Mak (MAC); W 4–0	Shah (IND); W 4–0	Matsushima (JPN); W 4–2	Lin (TPE); W 4–3	Wang (CHN); W 4–0	1st place, gold medalist(s)
Wang Chuqin	Singles	Bye	Preechayan (THA); W 4–2	U (PRK); W 4–0	Feng (TPE); W 4–0	Alamian (IRI); W 4–1	Lin (CHN); L 0–4	2nd place, silver medalist(s)
Huang Youzheng; Lin Shidong	Doubles	Bye	Enkhtu Bodisuren / Enkhta Bodisuren (MGL); W 3–0	Lam / Yiu (HKG); W 3–0	Feng / Kuo (TPE); W 3–0	Matsushima / Togami (JPN); W 4–1	Harimoto / Shinozuka (JPN); W 4–2	1st place, gold medalist(s)
Wen Ruibo; Xiang Peng	Doubles	Bye	Gubran / Al-Dhubhani (YEM); W 3–0	Ri / U (PRK); W 3–1	No Alamian / Ni Alamian (IRI); W 3–0	Harimoto / Shinozuka (JPN); L 3–4	Did not advance	3rd place, bronze medalist(s)

Women

Athlete	Event	Round of 64	Round of 32	Round of 16	Quarterfinal	Semifinal	Final / BM	
Athlete	Event	Opposition Result	Opposition Result	Opposition Result	Opposition Result	Opposition Result	Opposition Result	Rank
Sun Yingsha	Singles	Bye	Ali (QAT); W 4–0	Paranang (THA); W 4–0	Joo C-h (KOR); W 4–2	Hayata (JPN); W 4–1	Wang (CHN); L 2–4	2nd place, silver medalist(s)
Wang Manyu	Singles	Bye	Majdi (QAT); W 4–0	Doo (HKG); W 4–1	Shin Y-b (KOR); W 4–0	Harimoto (JPN); W 4–1	Sun (CHN); W 4–2	1st place, gold medalist(s)
Chen Yi; Fan Shuhan	Doubles	Bye	Kim / Cha (PRK); W 3–1	Ghorpade / Chitale (IND); W 3–0	Harimoto / Hayata (JPN); L 0–3	Did not advance		
Kuai Man; Wang Manyu	Doubles	Bye	Romanovskaya / Zhaxylykova (KAZ); W 3–0	Akula / Das (IND); W 3–0	Nagasaki / Mende (JPN); W 3–0	Sawettabut / Paranang (THA); W 4–0	Harimoto / Hayata (JPN); W 4–0	1st place, gold medalist(s)

Mixed

Athlete	Event	Round of 64	Round of 32	Round of 16	Quarterfinal	Semifinal	Final	
Athlete	Event	Opposition Result	Opposition Result	Opposition Result	Opposition Result	Opposition Result	Opposition Result	Rank
Lin Shidong; Kuai Man	Doubles	Bye	Ri / Kim (PRK); W 3–0	Sanguansin / Paranang (THA); W 3–1	Desai / Ghorpade (IND); W 3–0	Lim J-h / Shin Y-b (KOR); W 4–2	Wang / Sun (CHN); W 4–0	1st place, gold medalist(s)
Wang Chuqin; Sun Yingsha	Doubles	Bye	Iskandarov / Kamalova (UZB); W 3–0	Feng / Yeh (TPE); W 3–0	Matsushima / Harimoto (JPN); W 3–0	Shah / Chitale (IND); W 4–0	Lin / Kuai (CHN); L 0–4	2nd place, silver medalist(s)

Team

Athlete	Event	Group stage				Round of 16	Quarterfinal	Semifinal	Final	
Athlete	Event	Opposition Score	Opposition Score	Opposition Score	Rank	Opposition Score	Opposition Score	Opposition Score	Opposition Score	Rank
Huang Youzheng; Lin Shidong; Wang Chuqin; Wen Ruibo; Xiang Peng	Men's	Macau; W 3–0	Qatar; W 3–0	—N/a	1 Q	Bye	Thailand; W 3–1	Chinese Taipei; W 3–0	Japan; L 2–3	2nd place, silver medalist(s)
Chen Yi; Fan Shuhan; Kuai Man; Sun Yingsha; Wang Manyu	Women's	Nepal; W 3–0	Macau; W 3–1	—N/a	1 Q	Bye	Uzbekistan; W 3–0	North Korea; W 3–0	Japan; W 3–0	1st place, gold medalist(s)

== Taekwondo ==
China entered 8 athletes into the Games.

Athlete	Event	Round of 16	Quarterfinal	Semifinal	Final	
Athlete	Event	Opposition Result	Opposition Result	Opposition Result	Opposition Result	Rank
Huang Kefen	Men's −58 kg	Yondonjamts (MGL); W 2–0	An H-s (KOR); L 0–2	Did not advance		
Chen Yufan	Men's −68 kg	Lo (HKG); W 2–0	Hajimousaeinafouti (IRI); L 1–2	Did not advance		
Xiang Qizhang	Men's −80 kg	Bakhtiari (IRI); W 2–0	Toleugali (KAZ); L 0–2	Did not advance		
Tang Hao	Men's +80 kg	Tran (VIE); W 2–0	Salimi (IRI); L 0–2	Did not advance		
Ma Jingyue	Women's −49 kg	Al-Hassan Al-Hinide (ART); W 2–0	Lee Y-m (KOR); W 2–0	Poolkerd (THA); W 2–0	Mangin (PHI); W 2–0	1st place, gold medalist(s)
Zhang Chuling	Women's −57 kg	Cacildes Vinothkanna (SRI); W 2–0	Kim Y-j (KOR); W 2–0	Lin (TPE); W 2–1	Khirfan (JOR); L 1–2	2nd place, silver medalist(s)
Xing Jiani	Women's −67 kg	Fatnassi (QAT); W 2–0	Wang (TPE); L 1–2	Did not advance		
Mu Wenzhe	Women's +67 kg	Bye	Chuenchooklin (THA); W 2–0	Saidova (UZB); W 2–0	Song D-b (KOR); L 1–2	2nd place, silver medalist(s)

== Tennis ==
China entered 5 male and 5 female players into the Games.

Athlete	Event	Round of 64	Round of 32	Round of 16	Quarterfinal	Semifinal	Final	
Athlete	Event	Opposition Result	Opposition Result	Opposition Result	Opposition Result	Opposition Result	Opposition Result	Rank
Wu Yibing	Men's singles	Bye	Yazdani (IRI); W 6–1, 6–1	Fitriadi (INA); W 6–1, 6–2	Nagal (IND); W 6–4, 6–4	Matsuoka (JPN); W 6–3, 6–2	Wong (HKG); L 2–6, 4–6	2nd place, silver medalist(s)
Meng Fanming	Men's singles	Bye	Sultanov (UZB); L 1–6, 4–6	Did not advance				
Wang Xiyu	Women's singles	—N/a	Junarto (INA); W 6–0, 6–0	Zhiyenbayeva (KAZ); W 6–1, 4–6, 6–1	Uchijima (JPN); W 6–4, 3–6, 6–1	Eala (PHI); W 3–6, 6–3, 6–2	Zhang (CHN); W 6–2, 6–1	1st place, gold medalist(s)
Zhang Shuai	Women's singles	—N/a	Bye	Safi (IRI); W 6–1, 6–0	Sakatsume (JPN); W 6–4, 6–3	Putintseva (KAZ); W 6–4, 6–2	Wang (CHN); L 2–6, 1–6	2nd place, silver medalist(s)
Jiang Fumin; Zhang Tianhui	Men's doubles	—N/a	Rahmani / Yazdani (IRI); W 6–4, 6–4	Sornlaksup / Trongcharoenchaikul (THA); W 7–6^{(7–1)}, 3–6, [10–5]	Chandrasekar / Balaji (IND); W 6–7^{(4–7)}, 7–6^{(9–7)}, [10–8]	Kusuhara / Aoyama (JPN); L 4–6, 6–0, [6–10]	Did not advance	3rd place, bronze medalist(s)
Kong Weiyi; Meng Fanming	Men's doubles	—N/a	Isaro / Jones (THA); L 5–7, 6–7^{(3–7)}	Did not advance				
Guo Hanyu; Zhang Shuai	Women's doubles	—N/a	Bye	Back D-y / Jang S-j (KOR); W 6–3, 6–4	Chan / Wu (TPE); L 6–7^{(2–7)}, 6–3, [13–15]	Did not advance		
Jiang Xinyu; Yang Zhaoxuan	Women's doubles	—N/a	Bye	Eala / Rivera (PHI); W 7–5, 6–2	Danilina / Putintseva (KAZ); L WO	Did not advance		
Zhang Tianhui; Jiang Xinyu	Mixed doubles	—N/a	Kurniawan / Junarto (INA); W 7–5, 6–1	Zhukayev / Kulambayeva (KAZ); W 6–3, 6–2	Ho / Chan (TPE); W 6–3, 2–6, [16–14]	Kusuhara / Aoyama (JPN); L 4–6, 3–6	Did not advance	3rd place, bronze medalist(s)
Wu Yibing; Guo Hanyu	Mixed doubles	—N/a	Munkhbaatar / Chogsomjav (MGL); W 6–0, 6–4	Rungkat / Sutjiadi (INA); W 7–6^{(7–3)}, 6–3	Tseng / Hsieh (TPE); L 2–6, 4–6	Did not advance		

== Triathlon ==
China entered 6 athletes into the Games.

Individual

Athlete	Event	Time						Rank
Athlete	Event	Swim (0.75 km)	Trans 1	Bike (20 km)	Trans 2	Run (5 km)	Total	Rank
Fan Junjie	Men's	8:55	0:34	28:21	0:18	15:21	53:29	5
Zhang Xirui	Men's	8:57	0:35	28:17	0:16	15:00	53:05	3rd place, bronze medalist(s)
Huang Anqi	Women's	9:54	0:36	30:16	0:20	16:52	57:58	2nd place, silver medalist(s)
Lin Xinyu	Women's	9:42	0:36	30:26	0:17	16:36	57:37	1st place, gold medalist(s)

Relay

Athlete	Event	Time						Rank
Athlete	Event	Swim (0.3 km)	Trans 1	Bike (6.6 km)	Trans 2	Run (1 km)	Total	Rank
Lin Xinyu	Mixed relay	4:04	0:44	10:11	0:24	6:39	22:02	—N/a
Li Mingxu	Mixed relay	4:03	0:46	9:48	0:21	6:10	21:08	—N/a
Huang Anqi	Mixed relay	4:31	0:50	10:28	0:22	6:13	22:24	—N/a
Zhang Xirui	Mixed relay	3:49	0:42	9:28	0:20	6:01	20:20	—N/a
Total	Mixed relay	—N/a					1:25:54	1st place, gold medalist(s)

== Volleyball ==
=== Beach ===
China entered 8 athletes into the Games.

Summary

Athletes	Event	Group stage				Round of 16	Quarterfinal	Semifinal	Final / BM	
Athletes	Event	Opposition Score	Opposition Score	Opposition Score	Rank	Opposition Score	Opposition Score	Opposition Score	Opposition Score	Rank
Wu Jiaxin; Zhou Chaowei	Men's	Nguyễn / Lê (VIE); W 2–1 (21–15, 18–21, 15–9)	Wong PL / Chong KL (HKG); W 2–0 (21–13, 21–13)	—N/a	1 Q	Faisal / Bayhaqly (INA); W 2–0 (21–13, 21–11)	Kurosawa / Mizumachi (JPN); L 1–2 (21–19, 13–21, 12–15)	Did not advance		
Song Jinyang; Wang Yanwei	Men's	Dauilbaev / Tolibaev (UZB); W 2–0 (21–8, 25–23)	Tachiya / Ishijima (JPN); W 2–0 (21–15, 21–18)	Mokhammad / Yakovlev (KAZ); W INJ	1 Q	Mou / Zainelabedin (QAT); W 2–0 (21–13, 21–16)	Efendi / Akbar (INA); L 0–2 (19–21, 18–21)	Did not advance		
Xia Xinyi; Yan Xu	Women's	Leong OI / Law WS (MAC); W 2–0 (21–13, 21–16)	Đinh / Mai (VIE); W 2–0 (21–14, 21–11)	—N/a	1 Q	Kim J-g / Shin J-e (KOR); W 2–0 (21–6, 21–12)	Kozhakhmet / Kabulbekova (KAZ); W 2–0 (21–12, 21–15)	Cao / Dong (CHN); W 2–0 (23–21, 24–22)	Naraphornrapat / Kongphopsarutawadee (THA); L 1–2 (17–21, 21–13, 15–8)	2nd place, silver medalist(s)
Cao Shuting; Dong Jie	Women's	Seo G-u / Kim H-j (KOR); W 2–0 (21–7, 21–6)	Kudaikulova / Rasulbek Kyzy (KGZ); W 2–0 (21–7, 21–10)	—N/a	1 Q	Nguyen / Chau (VIE); W 2–0 (21–13, 21–13)	Seehawong / Mungkhon (THA); W 2–0 (21–18, 21–13)	Xia / Yan (CHN); L 0–2 (21–23, 22–24)	Progella / Pagara (PHI); L 1–2 (21–13, 21–23, 13–15)	4

=== Indoor ===
China entered 39 athletes into the Games.

Summary

Team	Event	Group stage				Quarterfinal	Semifinal	Final / BM	
Team	Event	Opposition Score	Opposition Score	Opposition Score	Rank	Opposition Score	Opposition Score	Opposition Score	Rank
China men's	Men's tournament	Chinese Taipei; W 3–2	Philippines; W 3–0	South Korea; W 3–2	1 Q	Thailand; W 3–0	Japan; L 2–3	Pakistan; L 0–3	4
China women's	Women's tournament	Philippines; W 3–0	Kazakhstan; W 3–0	—N/a	1 Q	Vietnam; W 3–0	Thailand; W 3–2	Japan; W 3–0	1st place, gold medalist(s)

==== Men's tournament ====
Team roster

- Wen Zihua
- Jiang Chuan
- Wang Hebin
- Li Lei
- Yu Yuantai
- Li Yongzhen
- Wu Zhai
- Zhang Zhejia
- Peng Shikun
- Qu Zongshuai
- Zhang Jingyin
- Wang Bin

Group play

Pos	Team	Pld	W	L	Pts	SW	SL	SR	SPW	SPL	SPR	Qualification
1	China	3	3	0	7	9	4	2.250	298	276	1.080	Quarterfinals
2	South Korea	3	2	1	7	8	4	2.000	284	249	1.141	Quarterfinals
3	Chinese Taipei	3	1	2	4	6	7	0.857	279	299	0.933	Classification 9th–16th
4	Philippines	3	0	3	0	1	9	0.111	215	252	0.853	Classification 9th–16th

Source: asiangames2026.org
Rules for classification: Tiebreakers

==== Women's tournament ====
Team roster

- Wu Mengjie
- Zhuang Yushan
- Tang Xin
- Zhang Zixuan
- Gong Xiangyu
- Chen Houyu
- Wang Aoqian
- Yang Shuming
- Dong Yuhan
- Xie Shengyu
- Guo Zhongnan
- Wang Mengjie

Group play

Pos	Team	Pld	W	L	Pts	SW	SL	SR	SPW	SPL	SPR	Qualification
1	China	2	2	0	6	6	0	MAX	150	86	1.744	Quarterfinals
2	Kazakhstan	2	1	1	3	3	4	0.750	141	170	0.829	Quarterfinals
3	Philippines	2	0	2	0	1	6	0.167	143	178	0.803	Classification 9th–14th

Source: asiangames2026.org
Rules for classification: Tiebreakers

== Water polo ==
China entered 35 athletes into the Games.

Summary

Team	Event	Group stage						Quarterfinal	Semifinal	Final / BM	
Team	Event	Opposition Score	Opposition Score	Opposition Score	Opposition Score	Opposition Score	Rank	Opposition Score	Opposition Score	Opposition Score	Rank
China men's	Men's tournament	South Korea; L 14–15	Iran; W 12–8	Singapore; W 16–8	—N/a		1 Q	Thailand; W 26–4	Kazakhstan; L 10–11	Iran; W 13–9	3rd place, bronze medalist(s)
China women's	Women's tournament	Uzbekistan; W 32–6	Thailand; W 21–6	Singapore; W 27–6	Kazakhstan; W 19–3	Japan; W 19–18	—N/a				1st place, gold medalist(s)

=== Men's tournament ===
Group play

Pos	Team	Pld	W	PSW	PSL	L	GF	GA	GD	Pts	Qualification
1	China	3	2	0	0	1	42	31	+11	6 (Note: Iran 8–12 China)	Quarterfinals
2	Iran	3	2	0	0	1	42	31	+11	6	Quarterfinals
3	South Korea	3	1	0	1	1	40	43	−3	4	Quarterfinals
4	Singapore	3	0	1	0	2	30	49	−19	2	Quarterfinals

Source: Groups
Notes:

26 September 2026; 14:15	Report	South Korea	15–14	China	Nippon Gaishi Hall Rainbow Pool, Nagoya; Referees: Georgios Stavridis (GRE), Shuhei Fukaya (JPN)
26 September 2026; 14:15	Report	Score by quarters: 3–1, 3–4, 4–5, 5–4			Nippon Gaishi Hall Rainbow Pool, Nagoya; Referees: Georgios Stavridis (GRE), Shuhei Fukaya (JPN)
26 September 2026; 14:15	Report	Han 4	Goals	Cai 4	Nippon Gaishi Hall Rainbow Pool, Nagoya; Referees: Georgios Stavridis (GRE), Shuhei Fukaya (JPN)

27 September 2026; 15:50	Report	Iran	8–12	China	Nippon Gaishi Hall Rainbow Pool, Nagoya; Referees: Andrej Franulović (CRO), David Gómez (ESP)
27 September 2026; 15:50	Report	Score by quarters: 2–4, 4–3, 2–3, 0–2			Nippon Gaishi Hall Rainbow Pool, Nagoya; Referees: Andrej Franulović (CRO), David Gómez (ESP)
27 September 2026; 15:50	Report	Iranpour 3	Goals	Cai 5	Nippon Gaishi Hall Rainbow Pool, Nagoya; Referees: Andrej Franulović (CRO), David Gómez (ESP)

28 September 2026; 17:25	Report	Singapore	8–16	China	Nippon Gaishi Hall Rainbow Pool, Nagoya; Referees: Ruben Sap (NED), Andrej Franulović (CRO)
28 September 2026; 17:25	Report	Score by quarters: 2–2, 2–6, 1–3, 3–5			Nippon Gaishi Hall Rainbow Pool, Nagoya; Referees: Ruben Sap (NED), Andrej Franulović (CRO)
28 September 2026; 17:25	Report	three players 2	Goals	Chen 6	Nippon Gaishi Hall Rainbow Pool, Nagoya; Referees: Ruben Sap (NED), Andrej Franulović (CRO)

Quarterfinals

30 September 2026; 15:50	Report	China	26–4	Thailand	Nippon Gaishi Hall Rainbow Pool, Nagoya; Referees: Shahriar Assar (IRI), Tigran Simonyan (HKG)
30 September 2026; 15:50	Report	Score by quarters: 7–1, 5–1, 8–0, 6–2			Nippon Gaishi Hall Rainbow Pool, Nagoya; Referees: Shahriar Assar (IRI), Tigran Simonyan (HKG)
30 September 2026; 15:50	Report	five players 3	Goals	Khaekram 2	Nippon Gaishi Hall Rainbow Pool, Nagoya; Referees: Shahriar Assar (IRI), Tigran Simonyan (HKG)

Semifinals

2 October 2026; 17:25	Report	Kazakhstan	11–10	China	Nippon Gaishi Hall Rainbow Pool, Nagoya; Referees: Andrej Franulović (CRO), David Gómez (ESP)
2 October 2026; 17:25	Report	Score by quarters: 1–2, 3–2, 5–4, 2–2			Nippon Gaishi Hall Rainbow Pool, Nagoya; Referees: Andrej Franulović (CRO), David Gómez (ESP)
2 October 2026; 17:25	Report	Shakenov 3	Goals	Chen 5	Nippon Gaishi Hall Rainbow Pool, Nagoya; Referees: Andrej Franulović (CRO), David Gómez (ESP)

=== Women's tournament ===
Group play

Pos	Team	Pld	W	PSW	PSL	L	GF	GA	GD	Pts
1st place, gold medalist(s)	China	5	4	1	0	0	113	35	+78	14
2nd place, silver medalist(s)	Japan (H)	5	4	0	1	0	119	48	+71	13
3rd place, bronze medalist(s)	Thailand	5	2	0	1	2	51	78	−27	7
4	Kazakhstan	5	1	1	1	2	43	69	−26	6
5	Uzbekistan	5	1	1	0	3	47	93	−46	5
6	Singapore	5	0	0	0	5	39	89	−50	0

Source: Aichi–Nagoya 2026
(H) Host

20 September 2026; 17:40	Report	China	32–6	Uzbekistan	Nippon Gaishi Hall Rainbow Pool, Nagoya; Referees: Viktor Salnichenko (KAZ), Jeremy Cheng (SGP)
20 September 2026; 17:40	Report	Score by quarters: 8–1, 9–2, 8–3, 7–0			Nippon Gaishi Hall Rainbow Pool, Nagoya; Referees: Viktor Salnichenko (KAZ), Jeremy Cheng (SGP)
20 September 2026; 17:40	Report	Zhang Y. 6	Goals	six players 1	Nippon Gaishi Hall Rainbow Pool, Nagoya; Referees: Viktor Salnichenko (KAZ), Jeremy Cheng (SGP)

21 September 2026; 16:05	Report	Thailand	6–21	China	Nippon Gaishi Hall Rainbow Pool, Nagoya; Referees: Andrej Franulović (CRO), Viktoriya Markova (UZB)
21 September 2026; 16:05	Report	Score by quarters: 1–7, 1–3, 2–6, 2–5			Nippon Gaishi Hall Rainbow Pool, Nagoya; Referees: Andrej Franulović (CRO), Viktoriya Markova (UZB)
21 September 2026; 16:05	Report	six players 1	Goals	Zhang Y. 5	Nippon Gaishi Hall Rainbow Pool, Nagoya; Referees: Andrej Franulović (CRO), Viktoriya Markova (UZB)

22 September 2026; 16:05	Report	Singapore	6–27	China	Nippon Gaishi Hall Rainbow Pool, Nagoya; Referees: Georgios Stavridis (GRE), Viktoriya Markova (UZB)
22 September 2026; 16:05	Report	Score by quarters: 1–8, 2–6, 2–5, 1–8			Nippon Gaishi Hall Rainbow Pool, Nagoya; Referees: Georgios Stavridis (GRE), Viktoriya Markova (UZB)
22 September 2026; 16:05	Report	Lee 3	Goals	Zhang Q. 5	Nippon Gaishi Hall Rainbow Pool, Nagoya; Referees: Georgios Stavridis (GRE), Viktoriya Markova (UZB)

23 September 2026; 16:05	Report	China	19–3	Kazakhstan	Nippon Gaishi Hall Rainbow Pool, Nagoya; Referees: Andrej Franulović (CRO), Chisato Kurosaki (JPN)
23 September 2026; 16:05	Report	Score by quarters: 6–2, 3–0, 3–0, 7–1			Nippon Gaishi Hall Rainbow Pool, Nagoya; Referees: Andrej Franulović (CRO), Chisato Kurosaki (JPN)
23 September 2026; 16:05	Report	Shao 4	Goals	Mirshina 2	Nippon Gaishi Hall Rainbow Pool, Nagoya; Referees: Andrej Franulović (CRO), Chisato Kurosaki (JPN)

24 September 2026; 18:55	Report	China	14–14; PSO: 5–4	Japan	Nippon Gaishi Hall Rainbow Pool, Nagoya; Referees: Georgios Stavridis (GRE), Alessia Ferrari (ITA)
24 September 2026; 18:55	Report	Score by quarters: 6–2, 4–5, 3–5, 1–2			Nippon Gaishi Hall Rainbow Pool, Nagoya; Referees: Georgios Stavridis (GRE), Alessia Ferrari (ITA)
24 September 2026; 18:55	Report	Zhang Q. 4	Goals	Inaba 4	Nippon Gaishi Hall Rainbow Pool, Nagoya; Referees: Georgios Stavridis (GRE), Alessia Ferrari (ITA)

== Weightlifting ==
China entered 10 athletes into the Games.

Athlete	Event	Snatch		Clean & Jerk		Total	Rank
Athlete	Event	Result	Rank	Result	Rank	Total	Rank
Yang Yang	Men's −60 kg	138	1	166	4	304	1st place, gold medalist(s)
He Yueji	Men's −65 kg	152	1	175	2	327	2nd place, silver medalist(s)
Chen Shunnan	Men's −85 kg	163	3	211	2	374	3rd place, bronze medalist(s)
Tu Yi	Men's −95 kg	179	2	205	5	384	3rd place, bronze medalist(s)
Liu Huanhua	Men's −110 kg	185	4	220	3	405	3rd place, bronze medalist(s)
Zhao Jinlan	Women's −53 kg	94	3	124	=1	218	2nd place, silver medalist(s)
Yang Liuyue	Women's −61 kg	112	1	139	=1	251	1st place, gold medalist(s)
He Renxiu	Women's −77 kg	118	1	140	1	258	1st place, gold medalist(s)
Wu Yan	Women's −86 kg	124	=1	149	1	273	1st place, gold medalist(s)
Li Wenwen	Women's +86 kg	140	1	170	1	310	1st place, gold medalist(s)

== Wrestling ==
China entered 18 athletes into the Games.

Key:

- VT (ranking points: 5–0 or 0–5) – Victory by fall.
- VB (ranking points: 5–0 or 0–5) – Victory by injury (VF for forfeit, VA for withdrawal or disqualification)
- PP (ranking points: 3–1 or 1–3) – Decision by points – the loser with technical points.
- PO (ranking points: 3–0 or 0–3) – Decision by points – the loser without technical points.
- ST (ranking points: 4–0 or 0–4) – Great superiority – the loser without technical points and a margin of victory of at least 8 (Greco-Roman) or 10 (freestyle) points.
- SP (ranking points: 4–1 or 1–4) – Technical superiority – the loser with technical points and a margin of victory of at least 8 (Greco-Roman) or 10 (freestyle) points.

Freestyle

Athlete	Event	Round of 32	Round of 16	Quarterfinal	Semifinal	Repechage	Final / BM	
Athlete	Event	Opposition Result	Opposition Result	Opposition Result	Opposition Result	Opposition Result	Opposition Result	Rank
Zou Wanhao	Men's −57 kg	Bye	Gaso (PHI); W 4–0 ^{ST}	Han (PRK); L 1–3 ^{PP}	Did not advance	Alam (BAN); W 4–0 ^{ST}	Almaz Uulu (MGL); W 3–1 ^{PP}	3rd place, bronze medalist(s)
Ou Xuexian	Men's −65 kg	Maithong (THA); W 4–0 ^{ST}	Kiyooka (JPN); L 1–3 ^{PP}	Did not advance				
Lu Feng	Men's −74 kg	—N/a	Toktomambetov (KGZ); L 1–3 ^{PP}	Did not advance				
Hade Ayidusi	Men's −86 kg	—N/a	Begenjov (TKM); L 1–3 ^{PP}	Did not advance				
Zhou Junpeng	Men's −97 kg	—N/a	Punia (IND); L 1–4 ^{SP}	Did not advance				
Buheeerdun	Men's −125 kg	—N/a	Yadab (NEP); W 4–0 ^{ST}	Batbayar (MGL); W 4–0 ^{ST}	Sharipov (BHR); W 5–0 ^{VT}	Bye	Zare (IRI); L 1–4 ^{SP}	2nd place, silver medalist(s)
Feng Ziqi	Women's −50 kg	—N/a	Gavalez (PHI); W 4–0 ^{ST}	Kim (PRK); L 1–3 ^{PP}	Did not advance	—N/a	Keunimjaeva (UZB); W 4–0 ^{ST}	3rd place, bronze medalist(s)
Zhang Jin	Women's −53 kg	—N/a	Bye	Cervantes (PHI); W 5–0 ^{VT}	Antim (IND); L 1–3 ^{PP}	Bye	Omirbek (KAZ); W 5–0 ^{VT}	3rd place, bronze medalist(s)
Hong Kexin	Women's −57 kg	—N/a	Ahinsa (SRI); W 5–0 ^{VT}	Liao (TPE); W 4–0 ^{ST}	Raimova (KAZ); W 4–0 ^{ST}	Bye	Son (PRK); W 3–1 ^{PP}	1st place, gold medalist(s)
Zhang Qi	Women's −62 kg	—N/a	Narzilloeva (UZB); W 4–0 ^{ST}	Zhumanazarova (KGZ); W 4–0 ^{ST}	Kim (PRK); L 1–3 ^{PP}	Bye	Pai (TPE); W 4–0 ^{ST}	3rd place, bronze medalist(s)
Long Jia	Women's −68 kg	—N/a	Bye	Dang (VIE); W 4–0 ^{ST}	Ishii (JPN); L 0–5 ^{VT}	Bye	Enkhsaikhany (MGL); W 3–1 ^{PP}	3rd place, bronze medalist(s)
Li Wenji	Women's −76 kg	—N/a	Bye	Hwang (KOR); W 4–0 ^{ST}	Syzdykova (KAZ); L 1–3 ^{PP}	Bye	Enkh-Amaryn (MGL); W 3–1 ^{PP}	3rd place, bronze medalist(s)

Greco-Roman

Athlete	Event	Round of 16	Quarterfinal	Semifinal	Repechage	Final / BM	
Athlete	Event	Opposition Result	Opposition Result	Opposition Result	Opposition Result	Opposition Result	Rank
Tan Haodong	Men's −60 kg	Abbaspourragani (IRI); L 1–3 ^{PP}	Did not advance				
Leng Ji	Men's −67 kg	Khalmakhanov (UZB); L 0–4 ^{ST}	Did not advance		Jandu (KSA); W 3–0 ^{PO}	Beishekeev (KGZ); L 1–3 ^{PP}	5
Liu Rui	Men's −77 kg	Nguyen (VIE); W 4–0 ^{ST}	Noh Y-h (KOR); W 4–0 ^{ST}	Kusaka (JPN); L 0–4 ^{ST}	Bye	Makhmudov (KGZ); L 0–4 ^{ST}	5
Shi Likui	Men's −87 kg	Berdimuratov (UZB); L 0–4 ^{ST}	Did not advance				
Wang Zegang	Men's −97 kg	Yevloyev (KAZ); L 1–3 ^{PP}	Did not advance				
Meng Lingzhe	Men's −130 kg	Bye	Batbayar (MGL); W 4–0 ^{ST}	Mirzazadeh (IRI); L 1–3 ^{PP}	Bye	Botoev (KGZ); W 3–1 ^{PP}	3rd place, bronze medalist(s)

== Wushu ==
China entered 12 athletes into the Games.

Taolu

Athlete	Event	Event 1		Event 2		Total	Rank
Athlete	Event	Result	Rank	Result	Rank	Total	Rank
Li Jianming	Men's nanquan & nangun	9.780	1	9.783	1	19.563	1st place, gold medalist(s)
Liu Dewen	Men's taijiquan & taijijian	9.780	1	9.780	1	19.560	1st place, gold medalist(s)
Gao Xiaobin	Men's daoshu & gunshu	9.786	1	9.796	1	19.582	1st place, gold medalist(s)
Zhang Yaling	Women's nanquan & nandao	9.783	1	9.786	1	19.569	1st place, gold medalist(s)
Tong Xin	Women's taijiquan & taijijian	9.770	1	9.783	1	19.553	1st place, gold medalist(s)
Yao Yang	Women's jianshu & qiangshu	9.773	1	9.773	1	19.546	1st place, gold medalist(s)

Sanda

Key:

- WKO – Win by Technical Knock Out.
- WPD – Win by Point Difference.

Athlete	Event	Round of 32	Round of 16	Quarterfinal	Semifinal	Final	
Athlete	Event	Opposition Result	Opposition Result	Opposition Result	Opposition Result	Opposition Result	Rank
Ou Jiaming	Men's −56 kg	—N/a	Chunaro (NEP); W WPD	Hossain (BAN); W WKO	Abdurashitov (UZB); W 2–0	Dinh (VIE); W 2–0	1st place, gold medalist(s)
Tang Sishuo	Men's −60 kg	—N/a	Bayadaa (MGL); W WPD	Padua (PHI); W WPD	Hua (VIE); W WPD	Leung (HKG); W WPD	1st place, gold medalist(s)
Wang Chengjin	Men's −65 kg	Bye	Sunar (NEP); W WPD	Zhenishbek Uulu (KGZ); W WPD	Ashrafi (AFG); W WPD	Panahi (IRI); W 2–0	1st place, gold medalist(s)
Ma Shuo	Men's −70 kg	—N/a	Bye	Khakimov (KGZ); W WPD	Hotak (AFG); W WPD	Moharrami (IRI); W 2–0	1st place, gold medalist(s)
Wu Di	Women's −52 kg	—N/a	Gwon M-y (KOR); W 2–0	Xaiyasit (LAO); W WPD	Akter (BAN); W WPD	Sinkaei (IRI); W 2–0	1st place, gold medalist(s)
Zhang Xiaoyu	Women's −60 kg	—N/a	Rahimi (IRI); W 2–0	Lin (TPE); W WPD	Nguyen (VIE); W WPD	Naorem (IND); W 2–0	1st place, gold medalist(s)

== See also ==
- China at the 2026 Asian Para Games
