= List of Asian Games medalists in kurash =

This is the complete list of Asian Games medalists in kurash from 2018 to 2026.

== Men ==
=== 66 kg ===
Games	Gold	Silver	Bronze
2018 Jakarta–Palembang	Maruf Gaybulloev (UZB)	Ruslan Buriev (UZB)	Ghanbar Ali Ghanbari (IRI)
2018 Jakarta–Palembang	Maruf Gaybulloev (UZB)	Ruslan Buriev (UZB)	Chan Hao-cheng (TPE)
2022 Hangzhou	Artyom Shturbabin (UZB)	Majid Vahid (IRI)	Kwon Jae-deog (KOR)
2022 Hangzhou	Artyom Shturbabin (UZB)	Majid Vahid (IRI)	Khayrandeshi Murodzoda (TJK)
2026 Aichi–Nagoya	Majid Vahid (IRI)	Yosin Bobokalonov (TJK)	Kubanychbek Aibek Uulu (KGZ)
2026 Aichi–Nagoya	Majid Vahid (IRI)	Yosin Bobokalonov (TJK)	Sarvar Abdushukurov (TJK)

=== 81 kg ===
Games	Gold	Silver	Bronze
2018 Jakarta–Palembang	Elias Aliakbari (IRI)	Behruzi Khojazoda (TJK)	Omid Tiztak (IRI)
2018 Jakarta–Palembang	Elias Aliakbari (IRI)	Behruzi Khojazoda (TJK)	Sarvar Shomurodov (UZB)
2022 Hangzhou	Umid Esanov (UZB)	Bekadil Shaimerdenov (KAZ)	Hassan Baiqara Rasooli (AFG)
2022 Hangzhou	Umid Esanov (UZB)	Bekadil Shaimerdenov (KAZ)	Huang Chun-ta (TPE)
2026 Aichi–Nagoya	Akhror Ziyodullaev (UZB)	Ramin Ahmadzadeh (IRI)	Ken Oyoshi (JPN)
2026 Aichi–Nagoya	Akhror Ziyodullaev (UZB)	Ramin Ahmadzadeh (IRI)	Adilet Akhmetgali (KAZ)

=== 90 kg ===
Games	Gold	Silver	Bronze
2018 Jakarta–Palembang	Shermukhammad Jandreev (UZB)	Yakhyo Imamov (UZB)	Yersultan Muzapparov (KAZ)
2018 Jakarta–Palembang	Shermukhammad Jandreev (UZB)	Yakhyo Imamov (UZB)	Husein Misri (KUW)
2022 Hangzhou	Sadegh Azarang (IRI)	Kim Min-gyu (KOR)	Khaknazar Nazarov (TJK)
2022 Hangzhou	Sadegh Azarang (IRI)	Kim Min-gyu (KOR)	Işanmyrat Ataýew (TKM)

=== +90 kg ===
Games	Gold	Silver	Bronze
2018 Jakarta–Palembang	Mukhsin Khisomiddinov (UZB)	Jafar Pahlevani (IRI)	Mansour Sarwari (AFG)
2018 Jakarta–Palembang	Mukhsin Khisomiddinov (UZB)	Jafar Pahlevani (IRI)	Nurbek Turaev (UZB)
2022 Hangzhou	Mukhsin Khisomiddinov (UZB)	None awarded	Jeong Jun-yong (KOR)
2022 Hangzhou	Mukhsin Khisomiddinov (UZB)	None awarded	Kunathip Yea-on (THA)
2026 Aichi–Nagoya	Shokhrukhkhon Bakhtiyorov (UZB)	Shakarmamad Mirmamadov (TJK)	Kunathip Yea-on (THA)
2026 Aichi–Nagoya	Shokhrukhkhon Bakhtiyorov (UZB)	Shakarmamad Mirmamadov (TJK)	Bekmurod Oltiboev (UZB)

== Women ==
=== 52 kg ===
Games	Gold	Silver	Bronze
2018 Jakarta–Palembang	Gulnor Sulaymanova (UZB)	Pincky Balhara (IND)	Malaprabha Jadhav (IND)
2018 Jakarta–Palembang	Gulnor Sulaymanova (UZB)	Pincky Balhara (IND)	Oysuluv Abdumajidova (UZB)
2022 Hangzhou	Khilola Ortikboeva (UZB)	Sitora Elmurodova (UZB)	Saowalak Homklin (THA)
2022 Hangzhou	Khilola Ortikboeva (UZB)	Sitora Elmurodova (UZB)	Aýnur Amanowa (TKM)

=== 57 kg ===
Games	Gold	Silver	Bronze
2026 Aichi–Nagoya	Ibodatkhon Agojonova (UZB)	Lee Wan-ting (TPE)	Natsumi Kuroki (JPN)
2026 Aichi–Nagoya	Ibodatkhon Agojonova (UZB)	Lee Wan-ting (TPE)	Wang Pin-chun (TPE)

=== 63 kg ===
Games	Gold	Silver	Bronze
2018 Jakarta–Palembang	Dildora Shermetova (UZB)	Bayarbatyn Baasanjargal (MGL)	Khasani Najmu Shifa (INA)
2018 Jakarta–Palembang	Dildora Shermetova (UZB)	Bayarbatyn Baasanjargal (MGL)	Mukhlisa Abdumalikova (UZB)

=== 70 kg ===
Games	Gold	Silver	Bronze
2022 Hangzhou	Yu Dan (CHN)	Donya Aghaei (IRI)	Tsogt-Ochiryn Battsetseg (MGL)
2022 Hangzhou	Yu Dan (CHN)	Donya Aghaei (IRI)	Malikakhon Kakhorova (UZB)

=== 78 kg ===
Games	Gold	Silver	Bronze
2018 Jakarta–Palembang	None awarded	Otgony Mönkhtsetseg (MGL)	Yang Hsien-tzu (TPE)
2018 Jakarta–Palembang	None awarded	Otgony Mönkhtsetseg (MGL)	Nguyễn Thị Lan (VIE)
2026 Aichi–Nagoya	Pokizakhon Kamoldinova (UZB)	Mo Su-min (KOR)	Pincky Balhara (IND)
2026 Aichi–Nagoya	Pokizakhon Kamoldinova (UZB)	Mo Su-min (KOR)	Shokhista Nazarova (UZB)

=== 87 kg ===
Games	Gold	Silver	Bronze
2022 Hangzhou	Liu Yi (CHN)	Zahra Bagheri (IRI)	Melika Omidvand (IRI)
2022 Hangzhou	Liu Yi (CHN)	Zahra Bagheri (IRI)	Võ Thị Phương Quỳnh (VIE)

=== +87 kg ===
Games	Gold	Silver	Bronze
2026 Aichi–Nagoya	Kim Min-young (KOR)	Shih Liu Li-ling (TPE)	Fatemeh Barmaki (IRI)
2026 Aichi–Nagoya	Kim Min-young (KOR)	Shih Liu Li-ling (TPE)	Arailym Shegenova (KAZ)
