= Iran at the 2022 Asian Games =

- IOC code: IRI
- NOC: National Olympic Committee of the Islamic Republic of Iran

in Hangzhou
- Competitors: 289 in 35 sports
- Flag bearers: Javad Foroughi; Nahid Kiani
- Medals Ranked 7th: Gold 13 Silver 21 Bronze 20 Total 54

Asian Games appearances (overview)
- 1951; 1954; 1958; 1962; 1966; 1970; 1974; 1978; 1982; 1986; 1990; 1994; 1998; 2002; 2006; 2010; 2014; 2018; 2022; 2026

Iran competed in the 2022 Asian Games in Hangzhou, China from 23 September to 8 October 2023. Earlier the event was scheduled to held in September 2022 but due to COVID-19 pandemic cases rising in China the event was postponed and rescheduled to September–October 2023.

Iran participated at the Games with 289 athletes (211 men and 78 women) in 35 sports.

== Competitors ==
Sport	Men	Women	Total
3x3 basketball	4		4
Archery	6		10
Athletics	6	2	8
Badminton	1	1	2
Basketball	12		12
Beach volleyball	4		4
Boxing	5		5
Canoe slalom	0	1	1
Canoe sprint	8	8	16
Chess	5	1	6
Cycling	1	1	2
Diving	1		1
Equestrian	3	1	4
Fencing	4		4
Football	22		22
Gymnastics artistic	4		4
Handball	16		16
Inline freestyle skating	2	2	4
Judo	3	1	4
Ju-jitsu	2		2
Kabaddi	12	12	24
Karate	4	4	8
Kurash	3	4	7
Roller speed skating	4	4	8
Rowing	2	5	7
Shooting	8	9	17
Sport climbing	3	2	5
Swimming	4		4
Table tennis	3	1	4
Taekwondo	6	6	12
Tennis	1	1	2
Volleyball	12		12
Water polo	13		13
Weightlifting	7	3	10
Wrestling	12		12
Wushu	8	5	13
Total	211	78	289

== Medal summary ==
=== Medals by sport ===
Sport	Gold	Silver	Bronze	Total
Athletics	1	1		2
Canoe sprint			3	3
Chess	1			1
Cycling mountain bike			1	1
Fencing			2	2
Gymnastics artistic		1		1
Inline freestyle skating		1		1
Kabaddi		1	1	2
Karate	1		2	3
Kurash	1	3	1	5
Rowing		2		2
Shooting			1	1
Sport climbing	1			1
Table tennis			2	2
Taekwondo		3	5	8
Volleyball	1			1
Weightlifting		1		1
Wrestling	5	4	1	10
Wushu	2	4	1	7
Total	13	21	20	54

=== Medalists ===
Medal	Name	Sport	Event
Gold	Hossein Rasouli	Athletics	Men's discus throw
Gold	Parham Maghsoudloo; Amin Tabatabaei; Pouya Idani; Bardia Daneshvar; Amir Reza Pouraghabala	Chess	Men's team standard
Gold	Sajjad Ganjzadeh	Karate	Men's kumite +84 kg
Gold	Sadegh Azarang	Kurash	Men's 90 kg
Gold	Reza Alipour	Sport climbing	Men's speed
Gold	Mehdi Jelveh; Mohammad Mousavi; Mohammad Reza Hazratpour; Amin Esmaeilnejad; Saber Kazemi; Amir Hossein Esfandiar; Javad Karimi; Meisam Salehi; Mohammad Taher Vadi; Pouria Khanzadeh; Shahrouz Homayounfarmanesh; Mohammad Valizadeh	Volleyball	Men
Gold	Younes Emami	Wrestling	Men's freestyle 74 kg
Gold	Hassan Yazdani	Wrestling	Men's freestyle 86 kg
Gold	Amir Hossein Zare	Wrestling	Men's freestyle 125 kg
Gold	Mohammad Hadi Saravi	Wrestling	Men's Greco-Roman 97 kg
Gold	Amin Mirzazadeh	Wrestling	Men's Greco-Roman 130 kg
Gold	Afshin Salimi	Wushu	Men's sanda 65 kg
Gold	Yousef Sabri	Wushu	Men's sanda 75 kg
Silver	Ehsan Haddadi	Athletics	Men's discus throw
Silver	Mehdi Olfati	Gymnastics artistic	Men's vault
Silver	Taraneh Ahmadi	Inline freestyle skating	Women's speed slalom
Silver	Fazel Atrachali; Mohammad Esmaeil Nabibakhsh; Milad Jabbari; Hamid Mirzaei; Reza Mirbagheri; Amir Hossein Bastami; Alireza Mirzaeian; Mohammad Reza Shadloo; Moein Shafaghi; Mohammad Kazem Nasseri; Mohammad Reza Kaboudarahangi; Amir Mohammad Zafardanesh	Kabaddi	Men
Silver	Majid Vahid	Kurash	Men's 66 kg
Silver	Donya Aghaei	Kurash	Women's 70 kg
Silver	Zahra Bagheri	Kurash	Women's 87 kg
Silver	Mahsa Javer; Zeinab Norouzi	Rowing	Women's double sculls
Silver	Fatemeh Mojallal; Nazanin Malaei; Mahsa Javer; Zeinab Norouzi	Rowing	Women's quadruple sculls
Silver	Mehdi Haji Mousaei	Taekwondo	Men's 58 kg
Silver	Alireza Hosseinpour	Taekwondo	Men's 63 kg
Silver	Arian Salimi	Taekwondo	Men's +80 kg
Silver	Ali Davoudi	Weightlifting	Men's +109 kg
Silver	Rahman Amouzad	Wrestling	Men's freestyle 65 kg
Silver	Mojtaba Goleij	Wrestling	Men's freestyle 97 kg
Silver	Amin Kavianinejad	Wrestling	Men's Greco-Roman 77 kg
Silver	Nasser Alizadeh	Wrestling	Men's Greco-Roman 87 kg
Silver	Shoja Panahi	Wushu	Men's sanda 60 kg
Silver	Mohsen Mohammadseifi	Wushu	Men's sanda 70 kg
Silver	Zahra Kiani	Wushu	Women's jianshu & qiangshu
Silver	Elaheh Mansourian	Wushu	Women's sanda 52 kg
Bronze	Adel Mojallali; Kia Eskandani	Canoe sprint	Men's C2 500 m
Bronze	Sepehr Saatchi; Peyman Ghavidel	Canoe sprint	Men's K2 500 m
Bronze	Hedieh Kazemi	Canoe sprint	Women's K1 500 m
Bronze	Faranak Partoazar	Cycling mountain bike	Women's cross-country
Bronze	Mohammad Rahbari	Fencing	Men's individual sabre
Bronze	Farzad Baher; Mohammad Fotouhi; Ali Pakdaman; Mohammad Rahbari	Fencing	Men's team sabre
Bronze	Ghazal Khalaj; Mahboubeh Sanchouli; Zahra Karimi; Saeideh Jafari; Sedigheh Jafari; Roya Davoudian; Farideh Zarifdoust; Mohaddeseh Rajabloo; Fatemeh Khodabandehloo; Fatemeh Mansouri; Maryam Solgi; Raheleh Naderi	Kabaddi	Women
Bronze	Sara Bahmanyar	Karate	Women's kumite 50 kg
Bronze	Fatemeh Saadati	Karate	Women's kumite 55 kg
Bronze	Melika Omidvand	Kurash	Women's 87 kg
Bronze	Amir Joharikhoo; Hanieh Rostamian	Shooting	Mixed 10 m air pistol team
Bronze	Nima Alamian; Noshad Alamian	Table tennis	Men's doubles
Bronze	Nima Alamian; Noshad Alamian; Amir Hossein Hodaei	Table tennis	Men's team
Bronze	Matin Rezaei	Taekwondo	Men's 68 kg
Bronze	Mehran Barkhordari	Taekwondo	Men's 80 kg
Bronze	Marjan Salahshouri	Taekwondo	Women's individual poomsae
Bronze	Mobina Nematzadeh	Taekwondo	Women's 49 kg
Bronze	Melika Mirhosseini	Taekwondo	Women's 67 kg
Bronze	Danial Sohrabi	Wrestling	Men's Greco-Roman 67 kg
Bronze	Shahrbanoo Mansourian	Wushu	Women's sanda 60 kg

== Results by event ==
=== Aquatics ===
==== Diving ====
Athlete	Event	Preliminary		Final	
Athlete	Event	Score	Rank	Score	Rank
Mohammad Moghaddasi	Men's 1 m springboard	—N/a		230.80	11
Mohammad Moghaddasi	Men's 3 m springboard	262.85	14	Did not advance	
Mohammad Moghaddasi	Men's 10 m platform	250.80	10 Q	280.90	10

==== Swimming ====
Athlete	Event	Heats		Final	
Athlete	Event	Time	Rank	Time	Rank
Samyar Abdoli	Men's 50 m freestyle	22.80	10	Did not advance	
Matin Sohran	Men's 50 m freestyle	23.47	15	Did not advance	
Samyar Abdoli	Men's 100 m freestyle	50.92	16	Did not advance	
Matin Sohran	Men's 200 m freestyle	1:53.57	20	Did not advance	
Homer Abbasi	Men's 50 m backstroke	26.32	15	Did not advance	
Homer Abbasi	Men's 100 m backstroke	58.20	18	Did not advance	
Mehrshad Afghari	Men's 50 m butterfly	24.67	19	Did not advance	
Mehrshad Afghari	Men's 100 m butterfly	54.07	13	Did not advance	
Matin Sohran	Men's 200 m individual medley	2:05.87	14	Did not advance	

==== Water polo ====
Team	Event	Preliminary round				Quarterfinal	Semifinal	Final	Rank
Team	Event	Round 1	Round 2	Round 3	Rank	Quarterfinal	Semifinal	Final	Rank
Iran	Men	South Korea; W 15–4	Thailand; W 26–7	China; L 7–15	2 Q	Singapore; W 13–6	Japan; L 11–18	3rd place match Kazakhstan; L 7–7 (2–3 P)	4
Roster: Hamed Karimi; Mehdi Daeitaghi; Amir Hossein Rahbar; Mehdi Barzegari; Amir Reza Jalilpour; Khashayar Ziaeddini; Peyman Asadi; Mehdi Yazdankhah; Soheil Rostamian; Amin Ghavidel; Arshia Almasi; Alireza Mehri; Amir Ata Khazaei; Coach: Mehdi Panamtash

=== Archery ===
Recurve

Athlete	Event	Ranking round		Round of 64	Round of 32	Round of 16	Quarterfinal	Semifinal	Final	Rank
Athlete	Event	Score	Rank	Round of 64	Round of 32	Round of 16	Quarterfinal	Semifinal	Final	Rank
Sadegh Ashrafi	Men's individual	662	21	Did not advance						56
Mohammad Hossein Golshani	Men's individual	669	14 Q	Bye	Rubel (BAN); L 0–6	Did not advance				17
Reza Shabani	Men's individual	677	5 Q	Bye	Zolkepeli (MAS); W 6–0	Qi (CHN); L 2–6	Did not advance			9
Sadegh Ashrafi; Mohammad Hossein Golshani; Reza Shabani	Men's team	2008	4 Q	—N/a		Uzbekistan; W 6–0	Indonesia; L 2–6	Did not advance		7
Mobina Fallah	Women's individual	618	38 Q	Al-Hajri (QAT); W 6–4	Sugimoto (JPN); L 1–7	Did not advance				17
Zahra Nemati	Women's individual	616	40	Did not advance						64
Yasna Pourmahani	Women's individual	617	39 Q	Al-Naqeeb (KUW); W 6–4	Choirunisa (INA); L 5–6	Did not advance				17
Mobina Fallah; Zahra Nemati; Yasna Pourmahani	Women's team	1851	10 Q	—N/a		Kazakhstan; W 5–3	China; L 2–6	Did not advance		7
Reza Shabani; Mobina Fallah	Mixed team	1295	10 Q	—N/a		Kazakhstan; W 5–4	China; W 6–0	Japan; L 0–6	3rd place match Indonesia; L 2–6	4

Compound

Athlete	Event	Ranking round		Round of 64	Round of 32	Round of 16	Quarterfinal	Semifinal	Final	Rank
Athlete	Event	Score	Rank	Round of 64	Round of 32	Round of 16	Quarterfinal	Semifinal	Final	Rank
Armin Pakzad	Men's individual	698	15 Q	Bye	Nguyễn (VIE); L 145–146	Did not advance				17
Mohammad Saleh Palizban	Men's individual	705	6 Q	Bye	Ibrahim (IRQ); W 145–142	Karabayev (KAZ); L 146–148	Did not advance			9
Milad Rashidi	Men's individual	692	25	Did not advance						45
Armin Pakzad; Mohammad Saleh Palizban; Milad Rashidi	Men's team	2095	4 Q	—N/a		Saudi Arabia; W 231–223	Malaysia; L 221–227	Did not advance		7
Gisa Baibordi	Women's individual	686	14 Q	Bye	Lê (VIE); W 138–138 (10–9 SO)	Huang (TPE); W 144–144 (10–9 SO)	So (KOR); L 144–148	Did not advance		6
Mohammad Saleh Palizban; Gisa Baibordi	Mixed team	1391	5 Q	—N/a		Thailand; L 148–154	Did not advance			9

=== Athletics ===
Athlete	Event	Round 1		Semifinal		Final	Rank
Athlete	Event	Time	Rank	Time	Rank	Time / Result	Rank
Hassan Taftian	Men's 100 m	10.42	2 Q	10.13	1 Q	10.14	4
Hossein Keyhani	Men's 5000 m	—N/a				DNS	—
Mehdi Pirjahan	Men's 400 m hurdles	50.95	5	—N/a		Did not advance	14
Hossein Keyhani	Men's 3000 m steeplechase	—N/a				8:45.98	7
Mehdi Saberi	Men's shot put	—N/a				19.41 m	5
Ehsan Haddadi	Men's discus throw	—N/a				61.82 m	2nd place, silver medalist(s)
Hossein Rasouli	Men's discus throw	—N/a				62.04 m	1st place, gold medalist(s)
Hamideh Esmaeilnejad	Women's 100 m	11.57	2 Q	—N/a		11.54	7
Farzaneh Fasihi	Women's 100 m	11.70	4	—N/a		Did not advance	9
Hamideh Esmaeilnejad	Women's 200 m	DNS	—	—N/a		Did not advance	—

=== Badminton ===
Athlete	Event	Round of 64	Round of 32	Round of 16	Quarterfinal	Semifinal	Final	Rank
Ali Hayati	Men's singles	Bye	Sok (CAM); L 0–2 (18–21, 13–21)	Did not advance				17
Yeganeh Kermani	Women's singles	Bye	Abdul Razzaq (MDV); L 1–2 (22–20, 13–21, 17–21)	Did not advance				17

=== Basketball ===
==== 3x3 ====
Athlete	Event	Preliminary round					Round of 16	Quarterfinal	Semifinal	Final	Rank
Athlete	Event	Round 1	Round 2	Round 3	Round 4	Rank	Round of 16	Quarterfinal	Semifinal	Final	Rank
Alireza Sharifi; Ehsan Dalirzahan; Mohammad Mehdi Rahimi; Amir Hossein Yazarloo	Men	South Korea; L 12–21	Maldives; W 22–6	Japan; W 22–13	Turkmenistan; W 19–13	3 Q	India; W 19–17	Mongolia; L 15–16	Did not advance		7

==== 5x5 ====
Team	Event	Preliminary round				Round of 16	Quarterfinal	Semifinal	Final	Rank
Team	Event	Round 1	Round 2	Round 3	Rank	Round of 16	Quarterfinal	Semifinal	Final	Rank
Iran	Men	United Arab Emirates; W 81–57	Saudi Arabia; W 81–66	Kazakhstan; W 86–60	1 Q	Bye	Philippines; L 83–84	5th–8th places South Korea; W 89–82	5th place match Saudi Arabia; W 92–60	5
Roster: Mohammad Shahrian; Sina Vahedi; Meisam Mirzaei; Sajjad Mashayekhi; Navid Rezaeifar; Peter Grigorian; Amir Ali Gholizadeh; Arsalan Kazemi; Matin Aghajanpour; Mohammad Torabi; Sajjad Pazirofteh; Hassan Aliakbari; Coach: (Turkey) Hakan Demir

=== Boxing ===
Athlete	Event	Round of 32	Round of 16	Quarterfinal	Semifinal	Final	Rank
Danial Shahbakhsh	Men's 57 kg	Lü (CHN); L 0–5	Did not advance				17
Ali Habibinejad	Men's 63.5 kg	Sinsiri (THA); L 0–5	Did not advance				17
Shahin Mousavi	Men's 80 kg	Bye	Negmatulloev (TJK); L 1–4	Did not advance			9
Toufan Sharifi	Men's 92 kg	—N/a	Al-Hindawi (JOR); W 4–1	Togambay (KAZ); L KO	Did not advance		5
Iman Ramezanpour	Men's +92 kg	—N/a	Ju (KOR); W DSQ	Berwal (IND); L 0–5	Did not advance		5

=== Canoeing ===
==== Slalom ====
Athlete	Event	Heat		Repechage		Semifinal		Final	Rank
Athlete	Event	Time	Rank	Time	Rank	Time	Rank	Time	Rank
Roksana Razeghian	Women's K1	114.52	5	119.77	2 Q	133.86	5 Q	131.83	4

==== Sprint ====
Athlete	Event	Heat		Semifinal		Final	Rank
Athlete	Event	Time	Rank	Time	Rank	Time	Rank
Mohammad Nabi Rezaei	Men's C1 1000 m	4:02.463	2 QF	Bye		4:19.328	4
Adel Mojallali; Kia Eskandani	Men's C2 500 m	1:53.096	2 QF	Bye		1:50.486	3rd place, bronze medalist(s)
Mohammad Nabi Rezaei; Kia Eskandani	Men's C2 1000 m	—N/a				3:55.301	4
Ali Aghamirzaei	Men's K1 1000 m	3:49.603	1 QF	Bye		3:53.255	4
Sepehr Saatchi; Peyman Ghavidel	Men's K2 500 m	1:38.003	1 QF	Bye		1:39.291	3rd place, bronze medalist(s)
Pouria Sharifi; Sepehr Saatchi; Ali Aghamirzaei; Peyman Ghavidel	Men's K4 500 m	1:26.220	2 QF	Bye		1:26.480	4
Hiva Afzali	Women's C1 200 m	55.278	5 QS	52.623	2 Q	49.898	6
Hedieh Kheirabadi; Hiva Afzali	Women's C2 200 m	—N/a				48.850	5
Maedeh Shourgashti; Hiva Afzali	Women's C2 500 m	—N/a				2:12.041	7
Hedieh Kazemi	Women's K1 500 m	2:09.054	3 QF	Bye		2:00.635	3rd place, bronze medalist(s)
Hedieh Kazemi; Elnaz Shafieian	Women's K2 500 m	1:56.379	3 QF	Bye		1:57.826	5
Elnaz Shafieian; Kiana Kamalzadeh; Hedieh Kazemi; Narjes Kargarpour	Women's K4 500 m	—N/a				1:46.942	5

=== Chess ===
Individual rapid

Athlete	Event	Swiss round									Rank
Athlete	Event	Round 1	Round 2	Round 3	Round 4	Round 5	Round 6	Round 7	Round 8	Round 9	Rank
Parham Maghsoudloo	Men	Setyaki (INA); D ½–½	Song (TPE); W 1–0	Nogerbek (KAZ); D ½–½	Yamada (JPN); W 1–0	Gujrathi (IND); L 0–1	Bersamina (PHI); D ½–½	Sindarov (UZB); L 0–1	Withdrew		25
Amin Tabatabaei	Men	Gan-Erdene (MGL); W 1–0	Priasmoro (INA); W 1–0	Abdusattorov (UZB); L 0–1	Erigaisi (IND); D ½–½	Nogerbek (KAZ); D ½–½	Song (TPE); W 1–0	Bu (CHN); D ½–½	Nguyễn (VIE); D ½–½	Bersamina (PHI); W 1–0	4
Mobina Alinasab	Women	Humpy (IND); L 0–1	Seo (KOR); W 1–0	Sukandar (INA); L 0–1	Chuemsakul (THA); W 1–0	Möngöntuul (MGL); W 1–0	Frayna (PHI); D ½–½	Assaubayeva (KAZ); L 0–1	Yakubbaeva (UZB); W 1–0	Abdumalik (KAZ); L 0–1	14

Team standard

Athlete	Event	Swiss round									Rank
Athlete	Event	Round 1	Round 2	Round 3	Round 4	Round 5	Round 6	Round 7	Round 8	Round 9	Rank
Parham Maghsoudloo; Amin Tabatabaei; Pouya Idani; Bardia Daneshvar; Amir Reza Pouraghabala	Men	Bangladesh; W 2½–1½	Kazakhstan; W 3–1	China; W 2½–1½	Uzbekistan; W 2½–1½	India; D 2–2	Vietnam; D 2–2	Mongolia; W 2½–1½	Philippines; W 3–1	South Korea; W 4–0	1st place, gold medalist(s)

=== Cycling ===
==== Mountain bike ====
Athlete	Event	Time	Rank
Faranak Partoazar	Women's cross-country	1:42:44	3rd place, bronze medalist(s)

==== Road ====
Athlete	Event	Time	Rank
Ali Labib	Men's road race	4:31:11	4

==== Track ====
Athlete	Event	Scratch race		Tempo race		Elimination race		Points race		Total	Rank
Athlete	Event	Rank	Points	Rank	Points	Rank	Points	Rank	Points	Total	Rank
Ali Labib	Men's omnium	10	22	6	30	6	30	5	43	125	4

=== Equestrian ===
Athlete	Horse	Event	1st Qualification		Qualifier 1		Qualifier 2		Final - Round 1		Final - Round 2	
Athlete	Horse	Event	Score	Rank	Score	Rank	Score	Rank	Score	Rank	Score	Rank
Omid Gharibi		Individual										
Naghmeh Khanjani		Individual										
Danial Mahzonalzakerin		Individual										
Masoud Mokarinezhad		Individual										

Athletes	Horses	Event	1st Qualification		Qualifier 1		Final	
Athletes	Horses	Event	Score	Rank	Score	Rank	Score	Rank
Gharibi; Khanjani; Mahzonalzakerin; Mokarinezhad		Team						

=== Fencing ===
Sabre

Athlete	Event	Pool round		Round of 32	Round of 16	Quarterfinal	Semifinal	Final	Rank
Athlete	Event	Results	Rank	Round of 32	Round of 16	Quarterfinal	Semifinal	Final	Rank
Ali Pakdaman	Men's individual	Mamutov (UZB) W 5–4; Al-Mutairi (KSA) L 2–5; Low (HKG) W 5–3; Sarkissyan (KAZ) W 5–2; Yonjan (NEP) W 5–1	7 Q	Bye	Shen (CHN); L 8–15	Did not advance			10
Mohammad Rahbari	Men's individual	Gu (KOR) L 0–5; Aymuratov (UZB) W 5–4; Srinualnad (THA) W 5–2; Vũ (VIE) W 5–4; Tahla (JOR) W 5–1; Al-Amr (KSA) W 5–2	5 Q	Bye	Yoshida (JPN); W 15–9	Yan (CHN); W 15–12	Oh (KOR); L 11–15	Did not advance	3rd place, bronze medalist(s)
Farzad Baher; Mohammad Fotouhi; Ali Pakdaman; Mohammad Rahbari	Men's team	—N/a			Bye	Hong Kong; W 45–39	China; L 41–45	Did not advance	3rd place, bronze medalist(s)

=== Football ===
Team	Event	Preliminary round				Round of 16	Quarterfinal	Semifinal	Final	Rank
Team	Event	Round 1	Round 2	Round 3	Rank	Round of 16	Quarterfinal	Semifinal	Final	Rank
Iran	Men	Saudi Arabia; D 0–0	Vietnam; W 4–0	Mongolia; W 3–0	1 Q	Thailand; W 2–0	Hong Kong; L 0–1	Did not advance		7
Roster: Hossein Hosseini; Saman Touranian; Hossein Goudarzi; Saman Fallah; Sina Shahabbasi; Omid Hamedifar; Mohammad Hossein Eslami; Mohammad Khodabandehloo; Amir Arsalan Motahhari; Yasin Salmani; Aria Barzegar; Alireza Rezaei; Fardin Yousefi; Amir Jafari; Mohammad Reza Ghobeishavi; Majid Nassiri; Mehdi Mamizadeh; Alireza Koushki; Mohammad Omri; Gholamreza Sabet Imani; Sina Saeidifar; Coach: Reza Enayati

=== Gymnastics ===
Men – Qualification

Athlete	Event	Floor		Pommel horse		Rings		Vault		Parallel bars		Horizontal bar		Total	
Athlete	Event	Score	Rank	Score	Rank	Score	Rank	Score	Rank	Score	Rank	Score	Rank	Score	Rank
Mehdi Ahmadkohani	Individual	DNS	—	DNS	—	13.400	12	DNS	—N/a	DNS	—	DNS	—	DNF	—
Mohammad Reza Hamidi	Individual	13.033	21	12.333	21	11.100	33	12.733	—N/a	12.933	22	12.666	14	74.798	12 Q
Mohammad Reza Khosronejad	Individual	13.233	20	11.066	29	12.933	18	12.866	—N/a	13.466	17	12.200	21	75.764	10 Q
Mehdi Olfati	Individual	DNS	—	DNS	—	DNS	—	14.566	2 Q	DNS	—	DNS	—	DNF	—
Mehdi Ahmadkohani; Mohammad Reza Hamidi; Mohammad Reza Khosronejad; Mehdi Olfati	Team	26.266		23.399		37.433		40.465		26.399		24.866		178.828	10

Men – Finals

Athlete	Event	FX	PH	SR	VT	PB	HB	Total	Rank
Mohammad Reza Hamidi	Individual all-around	12.966	11.300	12.533	12.900	13.000	12.833	75.532	10
Mohammad Reza Khosronejad	Individual all-around	12.666	12.233	13.266	12.833	13.666	12.066	76.730	7
Mehdi Olfati	Vault	—N/a			14.783	—N/a			2nd place, silver medalist(s)

=== Handball ===
Team	Event	Preliminary round				Second round				Semifinal	Final	Rank
Team	Event	Round 1	Round 2	Round 3	Rank	Round 1	Round 2	Round 3	Rank	Semifinal	Final	Rank
Iran	Men	Mongolia; W 50–16	Japan; L 21–33	Saudi Arabia; D 23–23	2 Q	Kuwait; L 22–24	Bahrain; L 20–29	South Korea; L 24–25	4	Did not advance		7
Roster: Mojtaba Heidarpour; Milad Ghalandari; Hossein Jahani; Yasin Kabirianjoo; Kiarash Taheri; Reza Yadegari; Mohammad Siavoshi; Mehran Rahnama; Younes Asari; Ali Shirani; Ali Rahimi; Mehdi Behnamnia; Mohammad Reza Kazemi; Afshin Sadeghi; Shahab Sadeghzadeh; Ali Kouhzad; Coach: (Montenegro) Veselin Vujović

=== Judo ===
Athlete	Event	Round of 32	Round of 16	Quarterfinal	Semifinal	Final	Rank
Abolfazl Mahmoudi	Men's 66 kg	Ri (PRK); L 00–10	Did not advance				17
Mehdi Fathipour	Men's 81 kg	Ghanim (IRQ); W 10–00	Gerbekov (BRN); L 00–10	Did not advance			9
Ghasem Baghcheghi	Men's 90 kg	Badawi (PLE); W 10–00	Khamza (KAZ); L 00–10	Did not advance			9
Maryam Barbat	Women's 70 kg	—N/a	Mayakova (KAZ); W 10–01	Matniyazova (UZB); L 00–10	Repechage; Nyam-Erdene (MGL); L 01–10	Did not advance	7

=== Ju-jitsu ===
Jiu-jitsu

Athlete	Event	Round of 32	Round of 16	Quarterfinal	Semifinal	Final	Rank
Mehran Sattar	Men's 62 kg	Keadnin (THA); W 3–0	Al-Murdhi (KSA); L 0–2	Did not advance			9
Ali Akbarpour	Men's 85 kg	Al-Rasheed (JOR); W 2–0	Sagdeev (KGZ); L 0–4	Did not advance			9

=== Kabaddi ===
Team	Event	Preliminary round				Semifinal	Final	Rank
Team	Event	Round 1	Round 2	Round 3	Rank	Semifinal	Final	Rank
Iran	Men	Pakistan; W 43–16	Malaysia; W 53–23	South Korea; W 64–23	1 Q	Chinese Taipei; W 47–24	India; L 29–33	2nd place, silver medalist(s)
Iran	Women	Nepal; W 43–19	Bangladesh; W 54–16	—N/a	1 Q	Chinese Taipei; L 24–35	Did not advance	3rd place, bronze medalist(s)
Roster – Men: Fazel Atrachali; Mohammad Esmaeil Nabibakhsh; Milad Jabbari; Hamid Mirzaei; Reza Mirbagheri; Amir Hossein Bastami; Alireza Mirzaeian; Mohammad Reza Shadloo; Moein Shafaghi; Mohammad Kazem Nasseri; Mohammad Reza Kaboudarahangi; Amir Mohammad Zafardanesh; Coach: Gholamreza Mazandarani Roster – Women: Ghazal Khalaj; Mahboubeh Sanchouli; Zahra Karimi; Saeideh Jafari; Sedigheh Jafari; Roya Davoudian; Farideh Zarifdoust; Mohaddeseh Rajabloo; Fatemeh Khodabandehloo; Fatemeh Mansouri; Maryam Solgi; Raheleh Naderi; Coach: (India) Shailaja Jain

=== Karate ===
Athlete	Event	Round of 32	Round of 16	Quarterfinal	Semifinal	Final	Rank
Amir Mehdizadeh	Men's 67 kg	Al-Masatfa (JOR); L 0–7	Did not advance	Repechage; Sharapov (TJK); W 1–0	Repechage; Phiandee (THA); W 6–5	3rd place match Amirali (KAZ); L 2–7	5
Bahman Asgari	Men's 75 kg	Mukhammadiev (UZB); W 6–0	Pi (KOR); W 4–2	Sakiyama (JPN); L 1–3	Did not advance		9
Mehdi Khodabakhshi	Men's 84 kg	—N/a	Ando (JPN); L 4–5	Did not advance			11
Sajjad Ganjzadeh	Men's +84 kg	—N/a	Xayasan (LAO); W 8–3	Awais (PAK); W 9–1	Kangtong (THA); W 3–2	Shadykanov (KGZ); W 4–2	1st place, gold medalist(s)
Sara Bahmanyar	Women's 50 kg	Bye	Shahmalarani (MAS); W 7–3	Chonn (CAM); W 8–0	Zhangbyrbay (KAZ); L 4–5	3rd place match Miyahara (JPN); W 6–5	3rd place, bronze medalist(s)
Fatemeh Saadati	Women's 55 kg	—N/a	Wong (MAC); W 6–0	Ku (TPE); L 0–4	Repechage; Hoàng (VIE); W 7–0	3rd place match Sanistyarani (INA); W 3–0	3rd place, bronze medalist(s)
Atousa Golshadnejad	Women's 61 kg	—N/a	Al-Ameri (UAE); W 4–1	Nguyễn (VIE); L 2–2	Repechage de Jesus (MAC); W 2–0	3rd place match Kanay (KAZ); L 0–1	5
Mobina Heidari	Women's 68 kg	—N/a	Zefanya (INA); L 4–5	Did not advance			10

=== Kurash ===
Athlete	Event	Round of 16	Quarterfinal	Semifinal	Final	Rank
Majid Vahid	Men's 66 kg	Lê (VIE); W 011–000	Chan (TPE); W 011–001	Murodzoda (TJK); W 102–000	Shturbabin (UZB); L 000–011	2nd place, silver medalist(s)
Sadegh Azarang	Men's 90 kg	Bye	Chauhan (IND); W 101–000	Ataýew (TKM); W 101–000	Kim (KOR); W 100–000	1st place, gold medalist(s)
Donya Aghaei	Women's 70 kg	Bye	Tsou (TPE); W 101–000	Kakhorova (UZB); W 011–000	Yu (CHN); L 000–100	2nd place, silver medalist(s)
Tahereh Azarpeivand	Women's 70 kg	Lee (TPE); L 000–100	Did not advance			9
Zahra Bagheri	Women's 87 kg	Bye	Salieva (KGZ); W 010–000	Võ (VIE); W 003–001	Liu (CHN); L 000–002	2nd place, silver medalist(s)
Melika Omidvand	Women's 87 kg	Bye	Tokas (IND); W 003–000	Liu (CHN); L 001–011	Did not advance	3rd place, bronze medalist(s)

=== Roller sports ===
==== Inline freestyle ====
Athlete	Event	Qualification		Round of 16	Quarterfinal	Semifinal	Final	Rank
Athlete	Event	Time	Rank	Round of 16	Quarterfinal	Semifinal	Final	Rank
Reza Lesani	Men's speed slalom	3.940	3 Q	Shibagaki (JPN); W 2–0	Kwon (KOR); W 2–0	Wang (TPE); L 0–2	3rd place match Huang (TPE); L 0–2	4
Amir Mohammad Savari	Men's speed slalom	4.319	8 Q	Brunkard (SGP); W 2–0	Huang (TPE); L 1–2	Did not advance		7
Taraneh Ahmadi	Women's speed slalom	4.294	2 Q	—N/a	Zhu (CHN); W 2–0	Ting (TPE); W 2–1	Liu (TPE); L 0–2	2nd place, silver medalist(s)
Romina Salek	Women's speed slalom	4.254	1 Q	—N/a	Moritoki (JPN); W 2–0	Liu (TPE); L 0–2	3rd place match Ting (TPE); L 1–2	4

==== Speed ====
Athlete	Event	Heats		Semifinal		Final	Rank
Athlete	Event	Rank	Time	Rank	Time	Time / Score	Rank
Mohammad Amin Heidari	Men's 1000 m sprint	1:43.066	12 Q	1:27.326	4 q	1:30.443	6
Kiarash Shamohammadi	Men's 1000 m sprint	1:34.484	5 Q	1:30.152	6	Did not advance	11
Amir Behzadi	Men's 10000 m points elimination	—N/a				Eliminated	8
Azad Hemmati	Men's 10000 m points elimination	—N/a				Eliminated	12
Kiarash Shamohammadi; Mohammad Amin Heidari; Amir Behzadi	Men's 3000 m relay	—N/a		4:16.520	3 q	4:16.962	4
Melika Manouchehrirad	Women's 1000 m sprint	1:37.217	4 Q	1:37.157	5 q	1:42.701	7
Negin Sheikhi	Women's 1000 m sprint	1:38.414	5 Q	1:37.082	4 q	1:43.869	8
Mahshid Kiaei	Women's 10000 m points elimination	—N/a				Eliminated	9
Nahal Moghaddam	Women's 10000 m points elimination	—N/a				Eliminated	8
Negin Sheikhi; Melika Manouchehrirad; Nahal Moghaddam	Women's 3000 m relay	—N/a				4:41.543	4

=== Rowing ===
Athlete	Event	Heat		Repechage		Semifinal		Final		Rank
Athlete	Event	Time	Rank	Time	Rank	Time	Rank	Time	Rank	Rank
Amir Hossein Mahmoudpour	Men's single sculls	7:27.30	1 QA/B	Bye		7:46.67	3 QA	7:23:97	6	6
Reza Ghahramani; Amir Hossein Mahmoudpour	Men's double sculls	6:20.13	2	6:45.11	2 QA	—N/a		6:34.02	4	4
Mahsa Javer; Zeinab Norouzi	Women's double sculls	7:09.29	1 QA	Bye		—N/a		7:17.08	2	2nd place, silver medalist(s)
Fatemeh Mojallal; Nazanin Malaei; Mahsa Javer; Zeinab Norouzi	Women's quadruple sculls	6:55.02	2 QA	—N/a				6:51.82	2	2nd place, silver medalist(s)
Kimia Zareei; Nazanin Malaei	Women's lightweight double sculls	6:59.11	1 QA	Bye		—N/a		7:17.90	4	4

=== Shooting ===
Athlete	Event	Qualification		Final		Team events			
Athlete	Event	Score	Rank	Score	Rank	Athlete	Event	Score	Rank
Javad Foroughi	Men's 10 m air pistol	573	26	Did not advance		Javad Foroughi; Amir Joharikhoo; Sajjad Pourhosseini	Men's 10 m air pistol team	1726	6
Amir Joharikhoo	Men's 10 m air pistol	578	9	Did not advance		Javad Foroughi; Amir Joharikhoo; Sajjad Pourhosseini	Men's 10 m air pistol team	1726	6
Sajjad Pourhosseini	Men's 10 m air pistol	575	18	Did not advance		Javad Foroughi; Amir Joharikhoo; Sajjad Pourhosseini	Men's 10 m air pistol team	1726	6
Amir Mohammad Nekounam	Men's 10 m air rifle	628.8	12	Did not advance		Amir Mohammad Nekounam; Pouria Norouzian; Mahyar Sedaghat	Men's 10 m air rifle team	1885.6	4
Pouria Norouzian	Men's 10 m air rifle	629.2	10	Did not advance		Amir Mohammad Nekounam; Pouria Norouzian; Mahyar Sedaghat	Men's 10 m air rifle team	1885.6	4
Mahyar Sedaghat	Men's 10 m air rifle	627.6	17	Did not advance		Amir Mohammad Nekounam; Pouria Norouzian; Mahyar Sedaghat	Men's 10 m air rifle team	1885.6	4
Amir Mohammad Nekounam	Men's 50 m rifle 3 positions	574	25	Did not advance		Amir Mohammad Nekounam; Pouria Norouzian; Mahyar Sedaghat	Men's 50 m rifle 3 positions team	1740	5
Pouria Norouzian	Men's 50 m rifle 3 positions	584	8 Q	402.2	8	Amir Mohammad Nekounam; Pouria Norouzian; Mahyar Sedaghat	Men's 50 m rifle 3 positions team	1740	5
Mahyar Sedaghat	Men's 50 m rifle 3 positions	582	12	Did not advance		Amir Mohammad Nekounam; Pouria Norouzian; Mahyar Sedaghat	Men's 50 m rifle 3 positions team	1740	5
Mohammad Beiranvand	Men's trap	117	16	Did not advance		—N/a			
Mina Ghorbani	Women's 10 m air pistol	570	23	Did not advance		Mina Ghorbani; Hanieh Rostamian; Golnoush Sebghatollahi	Women's 10 m air pistol team	1714	5
Hanieh Rostamian	Women's 10 m air pistol	573	15	Did not advance		Mina Ghorbani; Hanieh Rostamian; Golnoush Sebghatollahi	Women's 10 m air pistol team	1714	5
Golnoush Sebghatollahi	Women's 10 m air pistol	571	20	Did not advance		Mina Ghorbani; Hanieh Rostamian; Golnoush Sebghatollahi	Women's 10 m air pistol team	1714	5
Hanieh Rostamian	Women's 25 m pistol	584	6 Q	14	6	Hanieh Rostamian; Golnoush Sebghatollahi; Zeinab Toumari	Women's 25 m pistol team	1693	10
Golnoush Sebghatollahi	Women's 25 m pistol	566	31	Did not advance		Hanieh Rostamian; Golnoush Sebghatollahi; Zeinab Toumari	Women's 25 m pistol team	1693	10
Zeinab Toumari	Women's 25 m pistol	543	39	Did not advance		Hanieh Rostamian; Golnoush Sebghatollahi; Zeinab Toumari	Women's 25 m pistol team	1693	10
Elaheh Ahmadi	Women's 10 m air rifle	626.9	17	Did not advance		Elaheh Ahmadi; Shermineh Chehel-Amirani; Najmeh Khedmati	Women's 10 m air rifle team	1876.0	8
Shermineh Chehel-Amirani	Women's 10 m air rifle	628.6	11	Did not advance		Elaheh Ahmadi; Shermineh Chehel-Amirani; Najmeh Khedmati	Women's 10 m air rifle team	1876.0	8
Najmeh Khedmati	Women's 10 m air rifle	620.5	38	Did not advance		Elaheh Ahmadi; Shermineh Chehel-Amirani; Najmeh Khedmati	Women's 10 m air rifle team	1876.0	8
Elaheh Ahmadi	Women's 50 m rifle 3 positions	575	29	Did not advance		Elaheh Ahmadi; Najmeh Khedmati; Armina Sadeghian	Women's 50 m rifle 3 positions team	1742	6
Najmeh Khedmati	Women's 50 m rifle 3 positions	582	15	Did not advance		Elaheh Ahmadi; Najmeh Khedmati; Armina Sadeghian	Women's 50 m rifle 3 positions team	1742	6
Armina Sadeghian	Women's 50 m rifle 3 positions	585	11	Did not advance		Elaheh Ahmadi; Najmeh Khedmati; Armina Sadeghian	Women's 50 m rifle 3 positions team	1742	6
Marzieh Parvareshnia	Women's trap	105	17	Did not advance		—N/a			
Amir Joharikhoo; Hanieh Rostamian	Mixed 10 metre air pistol team	575	3 QB	3rd place match Pakistan; W 16–14	3rd place, bronze medalist(s)	—N/a			
Amir Mohammad Nekounam; Shermineh Chehel-Amirani	Mixed 10 metre air rifle team	629.0	5 QB	3rd place match Kazakhstan; L 11–17	5	—N/a			

=== Sport climbing ===
Speed

Athlete	Event	Qualification		Round of 16	Quarterfinal	Semifinal	Final	Rank
Athlete	Event	Time	Rank	Round of 16	Quarterfinal	Semifinal	Final	Rank
Milad Alipour	Men's speed	5.637	11 Q	Long (CHN); L 5.524–5.282	Did not advance			10
Reza Alipour	Men's speed	5.184	4 Q	Wong (HKG); W 5.280–8.021	Lee (KOR); W 5.162–5.417	Leonardo (INA); W 5.163–5.619	Long (CHN); W 5.302–Fall	1st place, gold medalist(s)
Mehdi Alipour; Milad Alipour; Reza Alipour	Men's speed relay	17.743	3 Q	—N/a	Singapore; L FS	Did not advance		5
Mahya Darabian	Women's speed	7.721	6 Q	Jeong (KOR); L 7.943–7.062	Did not advance			10

Combined

Athlete	Event	Qualification				Semifinal				Final			
Athlete	Event	Boulder	Lead	Total	Rank	Boulder	Lead	Total	Rank	Boulder	Lead	Total	Rank
Elnaz Rekabi	Women's combined	2T 1Z 1z 65.0	29+ 45.1	110.1	7 Q	1T 1Z 1z 52.80	32+ 42.1	94.90	7 Q	Cancelled			7

=== Table tennis ===
Individual

Athlete	Event	Round of 64	Round of 32	Round of 16	Quarterfinal	Semifinal	Final	Rank
Noshad Alamian	Men's singles	Bye	Al-Khadrawi (KSA); W 4–1 (5, −7, 6, 4, 3)	Harimoto (JPN); L 2–4 (−9, −10, −8, 5, 10, −10)	Did not advance			9
Amir Hossein Hodaei	Men's singles	Sultonov (TJK); W 4–0 (4, 5, 8, 6)	Quek (SGP); W 4–2 (7, 7, −5, 6, −4, 9)	Lin (TPE); L 0–4 (−6, −6, −2, −6)	Did not advance			9
Nima Alamian; Noshad Alamian	Men's doubles	Bye	Tancharoen and Tanviriyavechakul (THA); W 3–0 (8, 12, 10)	Huang and Liao (TPE); W 3–2 (−7, −8, 6, 9, 4)	Matsushita and Oikawa (JPN); W 3–0 (6, 8, 5)	Fan and Wang (CHN); L 0–4 (−4, −3, −3, −6)	Did not advance	3rd place, bronze medalist(s)
Shima Safaei	Women's singles	Bye	Hayata (JPN); L 0–4 (−1, −4, −6, −3)	Did not advance				17

Team

Athlete	Event	Preliminary round				Round of 16	Quarterfinal	Semifinal	Final	Rank
Athlete	Event	Round 1	Round 2	Round 3	Rank	Round of 16	Quarterfinal	Semifinal	Final	Rank
Nima Alamian; Noshad Alamian; Amir Hossein Hodaei	Men's team	Bahrain; W 3–0 (3–0, 3–0, 3–0)	Hong Kong; L 1–3 (1–3, 3–1, 0–3, 0–3)	Mongolia; W 3–0 (3–0, 3–0, 3–0)	2 Q	Vietnam; W 3–0 (3–1, 3–1, 3–0)	Japan; W 3–0 (3–2, 3–2, 3–2)	South Korea; L 0–3 (2–3, 2–3, 0–3)	Did not advance	3rd place, bronze medalist(s)

=== Taekwondo ===
Athlete	Event	Round of 32	Round of 16	Quarterfinal	Semifinal	Final	Rank
Morteza Zendehdel	Men's poomsae	—N/a	Ma (TPE); L 7.91–7.92	Did not advance			9
Mehdi Haji Mousaei	Men's 58 kg	Eleas (BAN); W 2–0 (14–0, 14–0)	Otajonov (UZB); W 2–0 (8–7, 7–6)	Altybaev (KGZ); W 2–0 (11–0, 16–8)	Cheng (CHN); W 2–1 (16–19, 19–5, 17–2)	Jung (KOR); L 0–2 (4–5, 4–4)	2nd place, silver medalist(s)
Alireza Hosseinpour	Men's 63 kg	Raihan (INA); W 2–0 (10–3, 13–0)	Khan (PAK); W 2–0 (10–3, 9–4)	Lee (KOR); W 2–0 (16–5, 14–2)	Al-Halawani (JOR); W 2–0 (6–3, 0–0)	Tubtimdang (THA); L 0–2 (6–7, 7–11)	2nd place, silver medalist(s)
Matin Rezaei	Men's 68 kg	Bye	Kurmanaliev (KGZ); W 2–0 (19–6, 12–0)	Xiao (CHN); W 2–1 (7–14, 12–12, 15–14)	Kareem (JOR); L 1–2 (10–14, 7–6, 5–8)	Did not advance	3rd place, bronze medalist(s)
Mehran Barkhordari	Men's 80 kg	Bye	Sahak (AFG); W 2–0 (7–0, 15–2)	Cea (PHI); W 2–0 (12–0, 13^{P}–7)	Park (KOR); L 1–2 (3–6, 11–8, 10–10)	Did not advance	3rd place, bronze medalist(s)
Arian Salimi	Men's +80 kg	—N/a	Morrison (PHI); W 2–0 (19–7, 15^{P}–9)	Sadek (JOR); W 2–0 (12–9, 6^{P}–4)	Lee (TPE); W 2–0 (14–10, 16–13)	Song (CHN); L 1–2 (11–17, 19–13, 15–21)	2nd place, silver medalist(s)
Marjan Salahshouri	Women's poomsae	—N/a	Khatun (BAN); W 7.72–7.07	Karim (MAS); W 7.78–7.78	Niwa (JPN); L 6.44–6.86	Did not advance	3rd place, bronze medalist(s)
Mobina Nematzadeh	Women's 49 kg	Bye	Garces (PHI); W 2–0 (9–5, 14–2)	Kapanova (KAZ); W 2–0 (13–4, 20–8)	Guo (CHN); L 0–2 (10–14, 8–25^{P})	Did not advance	3rd place, bronze medalist(s)
Nahid Kiani	Women's 53 kg	Bye	Jongkolrattanawattana (THA); L 1–2 (2–9, 8–4, 6–6)	Did not advance			9
Narges Mirnourollahi	Women's 57 kg	—N/a	Kim (KOR); L 0–2 (1–13, 8–9)	Did not advance			9
Melika Mirhosseini	Women's 67 kg	—N/a	Basnet (NEP); W 2–0 (14–1, 9–0)	Al-Sadeq (JOR); W 2–0 (5–5, 3–3)	Sadikova (UZB); L 1–2 (3–2, 10–13, 6–18)	Did not advance	3rd place, bronze medalist(s)
Anahita Tavakkoli	Women's +67 kg	—N/a	Alora (PHI); W 2–0 (9–2, 7–2)	Osipova (UZB); L 1–2 (2–10, 1–0, 0–1)	Did not advance		5

=== Tennis ===
Athlete	Event	Round of 64	Round of 32	Round of 16	Quarterfinal	Semifinal	Final	Rank
Sina Moghimi	Men's singles	Bye	Wu (TPE); L 0–2 (2–6, 1–6)	Did not advance				17
Meshkatolzahra Safi	Women's singles	Bye	Garland (TPE); L RET (0–6, 0–4)	Did not advance				17

=== Volleyball ===
==== Beach ====
Athlete	Event	Preliminary round				Round of 16	Quarterfinal	Semifinal	Final	Rank
Athlete	Event	Round 1	Round 2	Round 3	Rank	Round of 16	Quarterfinal	Semifinal	Final	Rank
Abbas Pourasgari; Alireza Aghajani	Men	Cheong and Wong (MAC); W 2–0 (21–11, 21–8)	Assam and Nassim (QAT); W 2–1 (21–15, 21–12)	Lee and Kim (KOR); W 2–0 (21–11, 21–11)	1 Q	Kaewsai and Jongklang (THA); W 2–0 (21–15, 21–15)	Ashfiya and Akbar (INA); W 2–1 (14–21, 21–15, 15–12)	Abuduhalikejiang and Wu (CHN); L 0–2 (24–26, 16–21)	3rd place match Bogatu and Yakovlev (KAZ); L 0–2 (23–25, 28–30)	4
Bahman Salemi; Sina Shokati	Men	Rustamzoda and Tursunov (TJK); W 2–0 (21–9, 21–6)	Al-Jalbubi and Al-Hashmi (OMA); W 2–0 (21–17, 21–11)	Tam and Chan (MAC); W 2–0 (21–8, 21–12)	1 Q	Takahashi and Ageba (JPN); W 2–1 (21–16, 18–21, 15–6)	Younousse and Tijan (QAT); L 0–2 (17–21, 19–21)	Did not advance		5

==== Indoor ====
Team	Event	Preliminary round			Round of 16	Quarterfinal	Semifinal	Final	Rank
Team	Event	Round 1	Round 2	Rank	Round of 16	Quarterfinal	Semifinal	Final	Rank
Iran	Men	Nepal; W 3–0 (25–9, 25–15, 25–13)	Bahrain; W 3–1 (25–16, 25–19, 22–25, 25–20)	1 Q	Thailand; W 3–0 (25–21, 25–18, 25–16)	Bye	Qatar; W 3–0 (25–20, 25–20, 25–22)	China; W 3–1 (19–25, 25–14, 25–22, 26–24)	1st place, gold medalist(s)
Roster: Mehdi Jelveh; Mohammad Mousavi; Mohammad Reza Hazratpour; Amin Esmaeilnejad; Saber Kazemi; Amir Hossein Esfandiar; Javad Karimi; Meisam Salehi; Mohammad Taher Vadi; Pouria Khanzadeh; Shahrouz Homayounfarmanesh; Mohammad Valizadeh; Coach: Behrouz Ataei

=== Weightlifting ===
Athlete	Event	Snatch		Clean & Jerk		Total	
Athlete	Event	Result	Rank	Result	Rank	Result	Rank
Hossein Soltani	Men's 81 kg	154	5	181	5	335	5
Amir Hoghoughi	Men's 96 kg	164	9	202	7	366	8
Mirmostafa Javadi	Men's 96 kg	161	11	202	8	363	9
Reza Dehdar	Men's 109 kg	NM	—	—	—	—	—
Mehdi Karami	Men's 109 kg	170	6	210	5	380	5
Ali Davoudi	Men's +109 kg	192	2	234	2	426	2nd place, silver medalist(s)
Ayat Sharifi	Men's +109 kg	185	4	NM	—	—	—
Reihaneh Karimi	Women's 64 kg	NM	—	—	—	—	—
Elaheh Razzaghi	Women's 76 kg	93	10	113	9	226	9
Elham Hosseini	Women's 87 kg	95	10	NM	—	—	—

=== Wrestling ===
Freestyle

Athlete	Event	Round of 32	Round of 16	Quarterfinal	Semifinal	Final	Rank
Ebrahim Khari	Men's 57 kg	—N/a	Lobreguito (PHI); W 10–0	Sehrawat (IND); L 8–19	Did not advance		7
Rahman Amouzad	Men's 65 kg	Rakhmonov (UZB); W 12–6	Yamaguchi (JPN); W 2–1	Wei (CHN); W 6–0	Punia (IND); W 8–1	Tulga (MGL); L 1–11	2nd place, silver medalist(s)
Younes Emami	Men's 74 kg	Bye	Toktomambetov (KGZ); W 7–2	Lu (CHN); W 10–2	Evloev (TJK); W 9–3	Kinoshita (JPN); W 9–0	1st place, gold medalist(s)
Hassan Yazdani	Men's 86 kg	Bye	Abdullaev (KGZ); W 10–0	Orazgylyjow (TKM); W 10–0	Bat-Erdene (MGL); W 10–0	Punia (IND); W 10–0	1st place, gold medalist(s)
Mojtaba Goleij	Men's 97 kg	—N/a	Ibragimov (UZB); W 13–7	Gankhuyag (MGL); W 4–2	Yergali (KAZ); W 3–1	Tazhudinov (BRN); L 1–6	2nd place, silver medalist(s)
Amir Hossein Zare	Men's 125 kg	—N/a	Anwar (PAK); W 10–0	Buheeerdun (CHN); W 10–0	Batirmurzaev (KAZ); W 11–0	Lkhagvagerel (MGL); W 7–0	1st place, gold medalist(s)

Greco-Roman

Athlete	Event	Round of 16	Quarterfinal	Semifinal	Final	Rank
Meisam Dalkhani	Men's 60 kg	Dahiya (IND); W 7–1	Sultangali (KAZ); L 2–4	Did not advance		8
Danial Sohrabi	Men's 67 kg	Ro (PRK); W 5–2	Ryu (KOR); W 9–0	Shermakhanbet (KAZ); L Fall (9–6)	3rd place match Li (CHN); W 3–2	3rd place, bronze medalist(s)
Amin Kavianinejad	Men's 77 kg	Kim (KOR); W 9–3	Omongeldiyev (UZB); W 5–3	Liu (CHN); W 1–1	Makhmudov (KGZ); L 1–1	2nd place, silver medalist(s)
Nasser Alizadeh	Men's 87 kg	Azisbekov (KGZ); W 7–1	Annamämmedow (TKM); W 7–1	Kumar (IND); W 5–1	Berdimurtov (UZB); L 4–7	2nd place, silver medalist(s)
Mohammad Hadi Saravi	Men's 97 kg	Assakalov (UZB); W 6–3	Dzhuzupbekov (KGZ); W 3–1	Umayev (KAZ); W 8–0	Li (CHN); W 5–1	1st place, gold medalist(s)
Amin Mirzazadeh	Men's 130 kg	Panphuek (THA); W 9–0	Kürräýew (TKM); W 9–0	Syzdykov (KAZ); W 3–1	Meng (CHN); W 1–1	1st place, gold medalist(s)

=== Wushu ===
Taolu

Athlete	Event	Round 1			Round 2			Total	Rank
Athlete	Event	Form	Score	Rank	Form	Score	Rank	Total	Rank
Ehsan Peighambari	Men's changquan	—N/a						9.443	10
Shahin Banitalebi	Men's nanquan & nangun	Nanquan	9.693	9	Nangun	9.686	10	19.379	10
Mohammad Ali Mojiri	Men's nanquan & nangun	Nanquan	9.690	11	Nangun	9.690	9	19.380	9
Hossein Gheblehnama	Men's daoshu & gunshu	Daoshu	9.423	7	Gunshu	9.696	6	19.119	6
Mina Panahi	Women's nanquan & nandao	Nanquan	DNF	—	Nandao	DNS	—	—	—
Hanieh Rajabi	Women's nanquan & nandao	Nanquan	9.653	8	Nandao	9.313	10	18.966	8
Zahra Kiani	Women's jianshu & qiangshu	Jianshu	9.720	2	Qiangshu	9.716	3	19.436	2nd place, silver medalist(s)

Sanda

Athlete	Event	Round of 16	Quarterfinal	Semifinal	Final	Rank
Shoja Panahi	Men's 60 kg	Isskandar (YEM); W PD	Omurzakov (KGZ); W 2–0	Padua (PHI); W WO	Wang (CHN); L 0–2	2nd place, silver medalist(s)
Afshin Salimi	Men's 65 kg	Bye	Trương (VIE); W 2–0	Jeon (KOR); W 2–0	Marbun (INA); W PD	1st place, gold medalist(s)
Mohsen Mohammadseifi	Men's 70 kg	Song (KOR); W 2–0	Paltaýew (TKM); W 2–0	Zhang (TPE); W 2–0	He (CHN); L 1–2	2nd place, silver medalist(s)
Yousef Sabri	Men's 75 kg	Tashpolatov (KAZ); W PD	Isroilov (UZB); W KO	Habibi (AFG); W PD	Cai (MAC); W PD	1st place, gold medalist(s)
Elaheh Mansourian	Women's 52 kg	Chaudhary (NEP); W PD	Altaf (PAK); W PD	Florentina (INA); W PD	Li (CHN); L 0–2	2nd place, silver medalist(s)
Shahrbanoo Mansourian	Women's 60 kg	—N/a	Rahmedowa (TKM); W PD	Wu (CHN); L 0–2	Did not advance	3rd place, bronze medalist(s)
