= Table tennis at the 2022 Asian Games =

- Venue: Gongshu Canal Sports Park Gymnasium
- Dates: 22 September – 2 October 2023
- Competitors: 174 from 24 nations

Table tennis at the 2022 Asian Games was held in Gongshu Canal Sports Park Gymnasium, Hangzhou, China, from 22 September to 2 October 2023.

China continued to dominate at table tennis in the Asian games, winning six out of seven gold medals. Only South Korea's victory in the women's doubles denied China a clean sweep of the gold medals on offer.

== Schedule ==
P	Preliminary rounds	¼	Quarterfinals	½	Semifinals	F	Final

Event↓/Date →	22nd Fri	23rd Sat	24th Sun		25th Mon	26th Tue	27th Wed	28th Thu		29th Fri	30th Sat	1st Sun		2nd Mon	
Men's singles							P	P		P	¼			½	F
Men's doubles							P	P		P	¼	½	F		
Men's team	P	P	P	¼	½	F									
Women's singles							P	P		P	¼	½	F		
Women's doubles								P		P	¼			½	F
Women's team	P	P	P	¼	½	F									
Mixed doubles					P		P	P	¼	½	F				

== Medalists ==
Event	Gold	Silver	Bronze
Men's singles	Wang Chuqin; China	Fan Zhendong; China	Jang Woo-jin; South Korea
Men's singles	Wang Chuqin; China	Fan Zhendong; China	Wong Chun Ting; Hong Kong
Men's doubles	China; Fan Zhendong; Wang Chuqin	South Korea; Jang Woo-jin; Lim Jong-hoon	Chinese Taipei; Chuang Chih-yuan; Lin Yun-ju
Men's doubles	China; Fan Zhendong; Wang Chuqin	South Korea; Jang Woo-jin; Lim Jong-hoon	Iran; Nima Alamian; Noshad Alamian
Men's team	China; Fan Zhendong; Liang Jingkun; Lin Gaoyuan; Ma Long; Wang Chuqin	South Korea; An Jae-hyun; Jang Woo-jin; Lim Jong-hoon; Oh Jun-sung; Park Gang-hyeon	Chinese Taipei; Chuang Chih-yuan; Huang Yan-cheng; Liao Cheng-ting; Lin Yun-ju; Peng Wang-wei
Men's team	China; Fan Zhendong; Liang Jingkun; Lin Gaoyuan; Ma Long; Wang Chuqin	South Korea; An Jae-hyun; Jang Woo-jin; Lim Jong-hoon; Oh Jun-sung; Park Gang-hyeon	Iran; Nima Alamian; Noshad Alamian; Amir Hossein Hodaei
Women's singles	Sun Yingsha; China	Hina Hayata; Japan	Shin Yu-bin; South Korea
Women's singles	Sun Yingsha; China	Hina Hayata; Japan	Wang Yidi; China
Women's doubles	South Korea; Jeon Ji-hee; Shin Yu-bin	North Korea; Cha Su-yong; Pak Su-gyong	Japan; Miwa Harimoto; Miyuu Kihara
Women's doubles	South Korea; Jeon Ji-hee; Shin Yu-bin	North Korea; Cha Su-yong; Pak Su-gyong	India; Sutirtha Mukherjee; Ayhika Mukherjee
Women's team	China; Chen Meng; Chen Xingtong; Sun Yingsha; Wang Manyu; Wang Yidi	Japan; Miwa Harimoto; Hina Hayata; Miu Hirano; Miyuu Kihara; Miyu Nagasaki	Thailand; Wanwisa Aueawiriyayothin; Tamolwan Khetkhuan; Orawan Paranang; Jinnipa Sawettabut; Suthasini Sawettabut
Women's team	China; Chen Meng; Chen Xingtong; Sun Yingsha; Wang Manyu; Wang Yidi	Japan; Miwa Harimoto; Hina Hayata; Miu Hirano; Miyuu Kihara; Miyu Nagasaki	South Korea; Jeon Ji-hee; Lee Eun-hye; Shin Yu-bin; Suh Hyo-won; Yang Ha-eun
Mixed doubles	China; Wang Chuqin; Sun Yingsha	China; Lin Gaoyuan; Wang Yidi	South Korea; Lim Jong-hoon; Shin Yu-bin
Mixed doubles	China; Wang Chuqin; Sun Yingsha	China; Lin Gaoyuan; Wang Yidi	South Korea; Jang Woo-jin; Jeon Ji-hee

== Medal table ==
Rank	Nation	Gold	Silver	Bronze	Total
1	China (CHN)	6	2	1	9
2	South Korea (KOR)	1	2	5	8
3	Japan (JPN)	0	2	1	3
4	North Korea (PRK)	0	1	0	1
5	Chinese Taipei (TPE)	0	0	2	2
5	Iran (IRI)	0	0	2	2
7	Hong Kong (HKG)	0	0	1	1
7	India (IND)	0	0	1	1
7	Thailand (THA)	0	0	1	1
Totals (9 entries)		7	7	14	28

== Participating nations ==
A total of 174 athletes from 24 nations competed in table tennis at the 2022 Asian Games:

- Bahrain (8)
- China (10)
- Chinese Taipei (10)
- Hong Kong (10)
- India (10)
- Iran (4)
- Japan (10)
- Kazakhstan (8)
- Lebanon (2)
- Macau (9)
- Maldives (7)
- Mongolia (10)
- Nepal (6)
- North Korea (8)
- Pakistan (5)
- Qatar (2)
- Saudi Arabia (5)
- Singapore (10)
- South Korea (10)
- Tajikistan (4)
- Thailand (10)
- Uzbekistan (3)
- Vietnam (10)
- Yemen (3)
