= Wushu at the 2022 Asian Games =

- Venue: Xiaoshan Guali Sports Centre
- Dates: 24–28 September 2023
- Competitors: 196 from 28 nations

Wushu at the 2022 Asian Games was held at Xiaoshan Guali Sports Centre, Xiaoshan, Hangzhou, China, from 24 to 28 September 2023.

== Schedule ==
●	Round	R	Round of 16	¼	Quarterfinals	½	Semifinals	F	Final

Event↓/Date →	24th Sun	25th Mon	26th Tue	27th Wed	28th Thu
Men's changquan	●				
Men's nanquan & nangun			●●		
Men's taijiquan & taijijian		●●			
Men's daoshu & gunshu				●●	
Men's sanda 56 kg	R		¼	½	F
Men's sanda 60 kg	R	R	¼	½	F
Men's sanda 65 kg		R	¼	½	F
Men's sanda 70 kg	R		¼	½	F
Men's sanda 75 kg	R	¼		½	F
Women's changquan		●			
Women's nanquan & nandao			●●		
Women's taijiquan & taijijian	●●				
Women's jianshu & qiangshu				●●	
Women's sanda 52 kg	R		¼	½	F
Women's sanda 60 kg		¼		½	F

== Medalists ==
=== Men's taolu ===
Event	Gold	Silver	Bronze
Changquan	Sun Peiyuan; China	Edgar Xavier Marvelo; Indonesia	Song Chi Kuan; Macau
Nanquan & Nangun	Harris Horatius; Indonesia	Lee Yong-mun; South Korea	Huang Junhua; Macau
Taijiquan & Taijijian	Gao Haonan; China	Samuei Hui; Hong Kong	Jones Inso; Philippines
Daoshu & Gunshu	Chang Zhizhao; China	Jowen Lim; Singapore	Seraf Naro Siregar; Indonesia

=== Men's sanda ===
Event	Gold	Silver	Bronze
56 kg	Jiang Haidong; China	Arnel Mandal; Philippines	Avazbek Amanbekov; Kyrgyzstan
56 kg	Jiang Haidong; China	Arnel Mandal; Philippines	Hứa Văn Đoàn; Vietnam
60 kg	Wang Xuetao; China	Shoja Panahi; Iran	Gideon Fred Padua; Philippines
60 kg	Wang Xuetao; China	Shoja Panahi; Iran	Kim Min-soo; South Korea
65 kg	Afshin Salimi; Iran	Samuel Marbun; Indonesia	Jeon Seong-jin; South Korea
65 kg	Afshin Salimi; Iran	Samuel Marbun; Indonesia	Clemente Tabugara; Philippines
70 kg	He Feng; China	Mohsen Mohammadseifi; Iran	Zhang Huan-yi; Chinese Taipei
70 kg	He Feng; China	Mohsen Mohammadseifi; Iran	Khalid Hotak; Afghanistan
75 kg	Yousef Sabri; Iran	Cai Feilong; Macau	Nasratullah Habibi; Afghanistan
75 kg	Yousef Sabri; Iran	Cai Feilong; Macau	Temirlan Amankulov; Kyrgyzstan

=== Women's taolu ===
Event	Gold	Silver	Bronze
Changquan	Li Yi; Macau	Liu Xuxu; Hong Kong	Kimberly Ong; Singapore
Nanquan & Nandao	Chen Huiying; China	Tan Cheong Min; Malaysia	Darya Latisheva; Uzbekistan
Taijiquan & Taijijian	Tong Xin; China	Basma Lachkar; Brunei	Chen Suijin; Hong Kong
Jianshu & Qiangshu	Lai Xiaoxiao; China	Zahra Kiani; Iran	Dương Thúy Vi; Vietnam

=== Women's sanda ===
Event	Gold	Silver	Bronze
52 kg	Li Yueyao; China	Elaheh Mansourian; Iran	Tharisa Dea Florentina; Indonesia
52 kg	Li Yueyao; China	Elaheh Mansourian; Iran	Ayan Tursyn; Kazakhstan
60 kg	Wu Xiaowei; China	Naorem Roshibina Devi; India	Nguyễn Thị Thu Thuỷ; Vietnam
60 kg	Wu Xiaowei; China	Naorem Roshibina Devi; India	Shahrbanoo Mansourian; Iran

== Medal table ==
Rank	Nation	Gold	Silver	Bronze	Total
1	China (CHN)	11	0	0	11
2	Iran (IRI)	2	4	1	7
3	Indonesia (INA)	1	2	2	5
4	Macau (MAC)	1	1	2	4
5	Hong Kong (HKG)	0	2	1	3
6	Philippines (PHI)	0	1	3	4
7	South Korea (KOR)	0	1	2	3
8	Singapore (SGP)	0	1	1	2
9	Brunei (BRU)	0	1	0	1
9	India (IND)	0	1	0	1
9	Malaysia (MAS)	0	1	0	1
12	Vietnam (VIE)	0	0	3	3
13	Afghanistan (AFG)	0	0	2	2
13	Kyrgyzstan (KGZ)	0	0	2	2
15	Chinese Taipei (TPE)	0	0	1	1
15	Kazakhstan (KAZ)	0	0	1	1
15	Uzbekistan (UZB)	0	0	1	1
Totals (17 entries)		15	15	22	52

== Participating nations ==
A total of 196 athletes from 28 nations competed in wushu at the 2022 Asian Games:

- Afghanistan (4)
- Brunei (6)
- China (11)
- Chinese Taipei (10)
- Hong Kong (7)
- India (10)
- Indonesia (12)
- Iran (13)
- Japan (6)
- Kazakhstan (6)
- Kyrgyzstan (4)
- Laos (3)
- Macau (9)
- Malaysia (7)
- Mongolia (2)
- Myanmar (4)
- Nepal (12)
- Pakistan (4)
- Philippines (8)
- Singapore (7)
- South Korea (11)
- Sri Lanka (2)
- Tajikistan (1)
- Thailand (10)
- Turkmenistan (6)
- Uzbekistan (6)
- Vietnam (13)
- Yemen (2)
