= Table tennis at the 2022 Asian Games – Men's doubles =

Men's doubles at the 2022 Asian Games
- Venue: Gongshu Canal Sports Park Gymnasium
- Dates: 27 September – 1 October 2023
- Competitors: 72 from 22 nations

Medalists
gold medal	Fan Zhendong; Wang Chuqin	China
silver medal	Jang Woo-jin; Lim Jong-hoon	South Korea
bronze medal	Chuang Chih-yuan; Lin Yun-ju	Chinese Taipei
bronze medal	Nima Alamian; Noshad Alamian	Iran

The men's doubles table tennis event was part of the table tennis programme and took place between 27 September and 1 October 2023, at the Gongshu Canal Sports Park Gymnasium.

== Schedule ==
All times are China Standard Time (UTC+08:00)

Date	Time	Event
Wednesday, 27 September 2023	16:00	Round of 64
Thursday, 28 September 2023	12:30	Round of 32
Friday, 29 September 2023	11:30	Round of 16
Saturday, 30 September 2023	12:00	Quarterfinals
Sunday, 1 October 2023	12:00	Semifinals
Sunday, 1 October 2023	18:30	Final

== Results ==
=== Finals ===
Quarterfinals
1	Jang Woo-jin (KOR); Lim Jong-hoon (KOR)	11	7	12	6	11
Manush Shah (IND); Manav Thakkar (IND)	8	11	10	11	9
5	Liang Jingkun (CHN); Lin Gaoyuan (CHN)	11	11	8	6	8
4	Chuang Chih-yuan (TPE); Lin Yun-ju (TPE)	6	7	11	11	11
Taisei Matsushita (JPN); Mizuki Oikawa (JPN)	6	8	5
8	Nima Alamian (IRI); Noshad Alamian (IRI)	11	11	11
7	Ho Kwan Kit (HKG); Wong Chun Ting (HKG)	2	5	7
2	Fan Zhendong (CHN); Wang Chuqin (CHN)	11	11	11

Semifinals
1	Jang Woo-jin (KOR); Lim Jong-hoon (KOR)	11	14	9	11	12
4	Chuang Chih-yuan (TPE); Lin Yun-ju (TPE)	8	12	11	7	10
8	Nima Alamian (IRI); Noshad Alamian (IRI)	4	3	3	6
2	Fan Zhendong (CHN); Wang Chuqin (CHN)	11	11	11	11

Final
1	Jang Woo-jin (KOR); Lim Jong-hoon (KOR)	6	8	7	3
2	Fan Zhendong (CHN); Wang Chuqin (CHN)	11	11	11	11

=== Top half ===
==== Section 1 ====
Round of 64	Round of 32					Round of 16
	1	Jang Woo-jin (KOR); Lim Jong-hoon (KOR)	11	11	11
		Kirill Gerassimenko (KAZ); Alan Kurmangaliyev (KAZ)	4	8	7
						1	Jang Woo-jin (KOR); Lim Jong-hoon (KOR)	11	11	11
							Đoàn Bá Tuấn Anh (VIE); Nguyễn Anh Tú (VIE)	7	6	5
		Đoàn Bá Tuấn Anh (VIE); Nguyễn Anh Tú (VIE)	11	11	11
		Cheong Chi Cheng (MAC); He Chon Fai (MAC)	9	8	4

==== Section 2 ====
Round of 64						Round of 32						Round of 16
							Moosa Munsif Ahmed (MDV); Mohamed Shaffan Ismail (MDV)	8	11	6	2
Sitisak Nuchchart (THA); Napat Thanmathikom (THA)	8	11	6	11	10		Manush Shah (IND); Manav Thakkar (IND)	11	9	11	11
Manush Shah (IND); Manav Thakkar (IND)	11	8	11	7	12								Manush Shah (IND); Manav Thakkar (IND)	3	11	11	5	11
												5	Koen Pang (SGP); Izaac Quek (SGP)	11	9	6	11	8
							Salman Mohamed Abuhamda (BRN); Sayed Murtadha Husain (BRN)	4	8	5
						6	Koen Pang (SGP); Izaac Quek (SGP)	11	11	11

==== Section 3 ====
Round of 64					Round of 32						Round of 16
					5	Liang Jingkun (CHN); Lin Gaoyuan (CHN)	2	11	11	11
						Shunsuke Togami (JPN); Maharu Yoshimura (JPN)	11	5	9	9
											5	Liang Jingkun (CHN); Lin Gaoyuan (CHN)	9	11	11	11
Lam Siu Hang (HKG); Ng Pak Nam (HKG)	11	11	7	11								Ham Yu-song (PRK); Ri Jong-sik (PRK)	11	3	3	9
Mohammed Abdulhussein (QAT); Abdullah Abdulhussein (QAT)	6	2	11	6		Lam Siu Hang (HKG); Ng Pak Nam (HKG)	9	9	11	9
						Ham Yu-song (PRK); Ri Jong-sik (PRK)	11	11	4	11

==== Section 4 ====
Round of 64	Round of 32							Round of 16
		Magd Al-Dhubhani (YEM); Omar Ahmed Ali (YEM)	9	11	7	13	6
		Azzam Alim (KSA); Khalid Al-Shareif (KSA)	11	6	11	11	11
									Azzam Alim (KSA); Khalid Al-Shareif (KSA)	2	3	7
								4	Chuang Chih-yuan (TPE); Lin Yun-ju (TPE)	11	11	11
		Ankhbayaryn Bilgüün (MGL); Myandalyn Temüülen (MGL)	3	2	4
	4	Chuang Chih-yuan (TPE); Lin Yun-ju (TPE)	11	12	11

=== Bottom half ===
==== Section 5 ====
Round of 64	Round of 32						Round of 16
	3	An Jae-hyun (KOR); Park Gang-hyeon (KOR)	11	11	11
		Ali Al-Khadrawi (KSA); Turki Al-Mutairi (KSA)	7	1	4
							3	An Jae-hyun (KOR); Park Gang-hyeon (KOR)	7	8	8
								Taisei Matsushita (JPN); Mizuki Oikawa (JPN)	11	11	11
		Taisei Matsushita (JPN); Mizuki Oikawa (JPN)	11	12	9	11
		Beh Kun Ting (SGP); Clarence Chew (SGP)	5	10	11	5

==== Section 6 ====
Round of 64				Round of 32					Round of 16
					Huang Yan-cheng (TPE); Liao Cheng-ting (TPE)	13	14	11
Đình Anh Hoàng (VIE); Lê Đình Đức (VIE)	11	11	11		Đình Anh Hoàng (VIE); Lê Đình Đức (VIE)	11	12	7
Chan Chi In (MAC); Zheng Hong Wai (MAC)	9	5	9							Huang Yan-cheng (TPE); Liao Cheng-ting (TPE)	11	11	6	9	4
									8	Nima Alamian (IRI); Noshad Alamian (IRI)	7	8	11	11	11
					Sarayut Tancharoen (THA); Padasak Tanviriyavechakul (THA)	8	12	10
				8	Nima Alamian (IRI); Noshad Alamian (IRI)	11	14	12

==== Section 7 ====
Round of 64				Round of 32						Round of 16
				7	Ho Kwan Kit (HKG); Wong Chun Ting (HKG)	11	11	11
					Alyas Alyassi (BRN); Rashed Khaled Sanad (BRN)	5	5	8
										7	Ho Kwan Kit (HKG); Wong Chun Ting (HKG)	11	11	7	11
Sanyog Kapali (NEP); Rubin Maharjan (NEP)	8	4	7								Afzalkhon Mahmudov (TJK); Ubaydullo Sultonov (TJK)	8	7	11	1
Muhammad Shah Khan (PAK); Faizan Zahoor (PAK)	11	11	11		Muhammad Shah Khan (PAK); Faizan Zahoor (PAK)	10	4	11	8
					Afzalkhon Mahmudov (TJK); Ubaydullo Sultonov (TJK)	12	11	4	11

==== Section 8 ====
Round of 64	Round of 32					Round of 16
		Sharath Kamal (IND); Sathiyan Gnanasekaran (IND)	11	11	11
		Gankhuyagiin Ser-Od (MGL); Mönkh-Ochiryn Manlaijargal (MGL)	5	3	3
							Sharath Kamal (IND); Sathiyan Gnanasekaran (IND)	5	4	7
						2	Fan Zhendong (CHN); Wang Chuqin (CHN)	11	11	11
		Aidos Kenzhigulov (KAZ); Vladislav Zakharov (KAZ)	7	3	3
	2	Fan Zhendong (CHN); Wang Chuqin (CHN)	11	11	11
