= Table tennis at the 2022 Asian Games – Men's team =

Men's team at the 2022 Asian Games
- Venue: Gongshu Canal Sports Park Gymnasium
- Date: 22–26 September 2023
- Competitors: 86 from 20 nations

Medalists
gold medal	China; Fan Zhendong, Liang Jingkun, Lin Gaoyuan, Ma Long, Wang Chuqin
silver medal	South Korea; An Jae-hyun, Jang Woo-jin, Lim Jong-hoon, Oh Jun-sung, Park Gang-hyeon
bronze medal	Chinese Taipei; Chuang Chih-yuan, Huang Yan-cheng, Liao Cheng-ting, Lin Yun-ju, Peng Wang-wei
bronze medal	Iran; Nima Alamian, Noshad Alamian, Amir Hossein Hodaei

The men's team table tennis event at the 2022 Asian Games took place from 22 to 26 September 2023 at the Gongshu Canal Sports Park Gymnasium.

== Schedule ==
All times are China Standard Time (UTC+08:00)

Date	Time	Event
Friday, 22 September 2023	12:00	Preliminary 1
Friday, 22 September 2023	18:00	Preliminary 2
Saturday, 23 September 2023	12:00	Preliminary 3
Sunday, 24 September 2023	12:00	Round of 16
Sunday, 24 September 2023	18:30	Quarterfinals
Monday, 25 September 2023	16:00	Semifinals
Tuesday, 26 September 2023	19:00	Final

== Results ==
=== Preliminary ===
==== Group A ====
Pos	Team	Pld	W	L	MF	MA	Pts	Qualification
1	China	2	2	0	6	0	4	Quarterfinals
2	Vietnam	2	1	1	3	4	3	Round of 16
3	Saudi Arabia	2	0	2	1	6	2	

Source: Official website

22 September	China	3–0	Vietnam

Wang Chuqin	3–0	Đinh Anh Hoàng	11–7, 12–10, 11–2
Ma Long	3–0	Nguyễn Anh Tú	11–8, 11–5, 11–3
Liang Jingkun	3–2	Đoàn Bá Tuấn Anh	11–0, 9–11, 8–11, 11–3, 11–8

22 September	Saudi Arabia	0–3	China

Ali Al-Khadrawi	0–3	Ma Long	6–11, 6–11, 1–11
Turki Al-Mutairi	0–3	Fan Zhendong	2–11, 6–11, 5–11
Azzam Alim	0–3	Wang Chuqin	3–11, 0–11, 3–11

23 September	Saudi Arabia	1–3	Vietnam

Ali Al-Khadrawi	3–1	Đinh Anh Hoàng	11–7, 8–11, 11–4, 14–12
Azzam Alim	2–3	Nguyễn Anh Tú	13–11, 11–2, 9–11, 6–11, 6–11
Khalid Al-Shareif	0–3	Đoàn Bá Tuấn Anh	14–16, 4–11, 1–11
Ali Al-Khadrawi	0–3	Nguyễn Anh Tú	10–12, 8–11, 9–11

==== Group B ====
Pos	Team	Pld	W	L	MF	MA	Pts	Qualification
1	Japan	2	2	0	6	0	4	Quarterfinals
2	North Korea	2	1	1	3	3	3	Round of 16
3	Nepal	2	0	2	0	6	2	

Source: Official website

22 September	Japan	3–0	Nepal

Tomokazu Harimoto	3–1	Rubin Maharjan	6–11, 11–2, 11–3, 11–5
Maharu Yoshimura	3–0	Sanyog Kapali	11–7, 11–3, 11–7
Shunsuke Togami	3–0	Bilash Shrestha	11–6, 11–3, 11–3

22 September	North Korea	0–3	Japan

Ham Yu-song	2–3	Maharu Yoshimura	6–11, 13–15, 11–3, 11–9, 3–11
Ri Jong-sik	0–3	Tomokazu Harimoto	5–11, 5–11, 4–11
An Ji-song	2–3	Shunsuke Togami	8–11, 7–11, 11–7, 11–9, 6–11

23 September	Nepal	0–3	North Korea

Sanyog Kapali	0–3	Ham Yu-song	7–11, 4–11, 5–11
Rubin Maharjan	0–3	An Ji-song	2–11, 6–11, 2–11
Bilash Shrestha	0–3	Ri Jong-sik	8–11, 2–11, 3–11

==== Group C ====
Pos	Team	Pld	W	L	MF	MA	Pts	Qualification
1	South Korea	2	2	0	6	0	4	Quarterfinals
2	Thailand	2	1	1	3	4	3	Round of 16
3	Macau	2	0	2	1	6	2	

Source: Official website

22 September	Macau	0–3	South Korea

Cheong Chi Cheng	0–3	Lim Jong-hoon	6–11, 3–11, 9–11
He Chon Fai	0–3	Jang Woo-jin	4–11, 4–11, 7–11
Kou Cheong Chak	0–3	Park Gang-hyeon	4–11, 3–11, 6–11

22 September	South Korea	3–0	Thailand

Lim Jong-hoon	3–1	Sarayut Tancharoen	11–7, 7–11, 11–4, 12–10
An Jae-hyun	3–0	Phakpoom Sanguansin	11–5, 13–11, 11–8
Oh Jun-sung	3–0	Sitisak Nuchchart	11–8, 11–1, 11–7

23 September	Macau	1–3	Thailand

Chan Chi In	2–3	Phakpoom Sanguansin	7–11, 11–8, 8–11, 11–7, 9–11
Zheng Hong Wai	1–3	Sarayut Tancharoen	6–11, 8–11, 11–4, 4–11
He Chon Fai	3–1	Napat Thanmathikom	3–11, 11–8, 11–8, 11–8
Chan Chi In	1–3	Sarayut Tancharoen	5–11, 10–12, 11–9, 10–12

==== Group D ====
Pos	Team	Pld	W	L	MF	MA	Pts	Qualification
1	Chinese Taipei	2	2	0	6	1	4	Quarterfinals
2	Kazakhstan	2	1	1	4	3	3	Round of 16
3	Maldives	2	0	2	0	6	2	

Source: Official website

22 September	Chinese Taipei	3–0	Maldives

Peng Wang-wei	3–0	Mohamed Shaffan Ismail	11–2, 11–1, 11–5
Huang Yan-cheng	3–0	Moosa Munsif Ahmed	11–5, 11–5, 11–7
Liao Cheng-ting	3–0	Akhyaar Ahmed Khalid	11–6, 11–5, 11–2

22 September	Kazakhstan	1–3	Chinese Taipei

Kirill Gerassimenko	1–3	Chuang Chih-yuan	9–11, 12–10, 7–11, 5–11
Aidos Kenzhigulov	0–3	Lin Yun-ju	5–11, 2–11, 5–11
Alan Kurmangaliyev	3–1	Huang Yan-cheng	9–11, 11–5, 11–9, 11–7
Kirill Gerassimenko	0–3	Lin Yun-ju	1–11, 11–13, 3–11

23 September	Kazakhstan	3–0	Maldives

Kirill Gerassimenko	3–0	Akhyaar Ahmed Khalid	11–3, 11–2, 11–5
Alan Kurmangaliyev	3–0	Mohamed Shaffan Ismail	11–8, 11–6, 11–8
Vladislav Zakharov	3–0	Moosa Munsif Ahmed	11–5, 11–9, 11–7

==== Group E ====
Pos	Team	Pld	W	L	MF	MA	Pts	Qualification
1	Hong Kong	3	3	0	9	1	6	Round of 16
2	Iran	3	2	1	7	3	5	Round of 16
3	Bahrain	3	1	2	3	7	4	
4	Mongolia	3	0	3	1	9	3	

Source: Official website

22 September	Hong Kong	3–0	Mongolia

Wong Chun Ting	3–0	Myandalyn Temüülen	11–3, 11–5, 11–2
Ho Kwan Kit	3–0	Gankhuyagiin Ser-Od	11–7, 11–2, 11–2
Lam Siu Hang	3–0	Mönkh-Ochiryn Manlaijargal	11–3, 11–3, 11–4

22 September	Bahrain	0–3	Iran

Rashed Khaled Sanad	0–3	Amir Hossein Hodaei	6–11, 9–11, 4–11
Alyas Alyassi	0–3	Nima Alamian	4–11, 6–11, 6–11
Sayed Murtadha Husain	0–3	Noshad Alamian	9–11, 1–11, 8–11

22 September	Hong Kong	3–1	Iran

Wong Chun Ting	3–1	Nima Alamian	11–13, 12–10, 11–6, 11–7
Lam Siu Hang	1–3	Noshad Alamian	12–10, 4–11, 7–11, 6–11
Ho Kwan Kit	3–0	Amir Hossein Hodaei	11–8, 11–7, 11–8
Wong Chun Ting	3–0	Noshad Alamian	12–10, 11–9, 11–7

22 September	Bahrain	3–1	Mongolia

Rashed Khaled Sanad	3–2	Myandalyn Temüülen	14–12, 8–11, 14–16, 11–6, 11–8
Alyas Alyassi	1–3	Gankhuyagiin Ser-Od	4–11, 12–10, 9–11, 9–11
Sayed Murtadha Husain	3–1	Mönkh-Ochiryn Manlaijargal	11–6, 10–12, 11–4, 12–10
Rashed Khaled Sanad	3–0	Gankhuyagiin Ser-Od	11–9, 11–8, 11–8

23 September	Hong Kong	3–0	Bahrain

Ho Kwan Kit	3–0	Sayed Murtadha Husain	11–5, 11–6, 11–1
Ng Pak Nam	3–1	Rashed Khaled Sanad	12–10, 11–8, 9–11, 11–6
Yiu Kwan To	3–0	Salman Mohamed Abuhamda	11–4, 11–6, 11–8

23 September	Mongolia	0–3	Iran

Gankhuyagiin Ser-Od	0–3	Amir Hossein Hodaei	7–11, 5–11, 7–11
Myandalyn Temüülen	0–3	Noshad Alamian	7–11, 1–11, 1–11
Ankhbayaryn Bilgüün	0–3	Nima Alamian	3–11, 3–11, 4–11

==== Group F ====
Pos	Team	Pld	W	L	MF	MA	Pts	Qualification
1	India	3	3	0	9	1	6	Round of 16
2	Singapore	3	2	1	7	3	5	Round of 16
3	Yemen	3	1	2	3	7	4	
4	Tajikistan	3	0	3	1	9	3	

Source: Official website

22 September	India	3–0	Yemen

Sathiyan Gnanasekaran	3–0	Omar Ahmed Ali	11–3, 11–2, 11–6
Sharath Kamal	3–0	Ebrahim Gubran	11–3, 11–4, 11–6
Harmeet Desai	3–0	Magd Al-Dhubhani	11–1, 11–1, 11–7

22 September	Singapore	3–0	Tajikistan

Izaac Quek	3–0	Afzalkhon Mahmudov	11–3, 11–1, 11–6
Koen Pang	3–0	Ibrokhim Ismoilzoda	11–6, 11–3, 11–2
Clarence Chew	3–0	Ubaydullo Sultonov	11–4, 11–5, 11–8

22 September	India	3–1	Singapore

Sathiyan Gnanasekaran	3–1	Izaac Quek	5–11, 12–10, 11–6, 11–9
Harmeet Desai	3–2	Koen Pang	12–10, 11–8, 6–11, 6–11, 11–5
Sharath Kamal	1–3	Clarence Chew	11–13, 8–11, 12–10, 5–11
Sathiyan Gnanasekaran	3–1	Koen Pang	11–7, 10–12, 11–9, 11–6

22 September	Yemen	3–1	Tajikistan

Omar Ahmed Ali	3–0	Afzalkhon Mahmudov	11–6, 11–9, 11–7
Magd Al-Dhubhani	3–0	Ibrokhim Ismoilzoda	11–4, 11–5, 11–4
Ebrahim Gubran	2–3	Ubaydullo Sultonov	7–11, 11–4, 11–9, 6–11, 6–11
Omar Ahmed Ali	3–0	Ibrokhim Ismoilzoda	11–1, 11–7, 11–3

23 September	Tajikistan	0–3	India

Afzalkhon Mahmudov	0–3	Manav Thakkar	8–11, 5–11, 8–11
Ubaydullo Sultonov	0–3	Manush Shah	11–13, 7–11, 5–11
Ibrokhim Ismoilzoda	0–3	Harmeet Desai	1–11, 3–11, 5–11

23 September	Singapore	3–0	Yemen

Izaac Quek	3–0	Ebrahim Gubran	11–2, 11–3, 11–6
Koen Pang	3–0	Omar Ahmed Ali	11–8, 11–3, 11–6
Clarence Chew	3–0	Magd Al-Dhubhani	11–6, 11–3, 11–5

=== Knockout round ===
Round of 16
Thailand	0
Singapore	3
E1	Hong Kong	3
North Korea	1
Kazakhstan	2
F1	India	3
Vietnam	0
Iran	3

Quarterfinals
A1	China	3
Singapore	0
E1	Hong Kong	0
D1	Chinese Taipei	3
C1	South Korea	3
F1	India	0
Iran	3
B1	Japan	0

Semifinals
A1	China	3
D1	Chinese Taipei	0
C1	South Korea	3
Iran	0

Final
A1	China	3
C1	South Korea	0

==== Round of 16 ====
24 September	Thailand	0–3	Singapore

Sarayut Tancharoen	1–3	Koen Pang	5–11, 11–6, 8–11, 7–11
Phakpoom Sanguansin	0–3	Izaac Quek	9–11, 6–11, 8–11
Napat Thanmathikom	0–3	Clarence Chew	6–11, 7–11, 4–11

24 September	Hong Kong	3–1	North Korea

Wong Chun Ting	3–0	An Ji-song	11–3, 11–9, 11–6
Lam Siu Hang	3–0	Ham Yu-song	13–11, 11–9, 11–5
Ho Kwan Kit	2–3	Ri Jong-sik	11–7, 11–8, 4–11, 8–11, 8–11
Wong Chun Ting	3–1	Han Yu-song	11–5, 11–9, 4–11, 11–6

24 September	Kazakhstan	2–3	India

Kirill Gerassimenko	3–1	Sharath Kamal	11–8, 9–11, 11–6, 11–8
Aidos Kenzhigulov	0–3	Sathiyan Gnanasekaran	12–14, 8–11, 4–11
Alan Kurmangaliyev	0–3	Harmeet Desai	7–11, 10–12, 5–11
Kirill Gerassimenko	3–2	Sathiyan Gnanasekaran	11–5, 9–11, 11–9, 5–11, 11–5
Aidos Kenzhigulov	2–3	Sharath Kamal	11–5, 11–7, 9–11, 8–11, 9–11

24 September	Vietnam	0–3	Iran

Nguyễn Anh Tú	1–3	Amir Hossein Hodaei	11–5, 8–11, 9–11, 8–11
Đinh Anh Hoàng	1–3	Noshad Alamian	4–11, 10–12, 13–11, 2–11
Đoàn Bá Tuấn Anh	0–3	Nima Alamian	9–11, 7–11, 2–11

==== Quarterfinals ====
24 September	China	3–0	Singapore

Fan Zhendong	3–0	Koen Pang	11–9, 11–6, 11–4
Wang Chuqin	3–0	Izaac Quek	11–6, 11–8, 11–5
Ma Long	3–0	Clarence Chew	11–7, 11–5, 11–5

24 September	Hong Kong	0–3	Chinese Taipei

Wong Chun Ting	1–3	Chuang Chih-yuan	13–11, 8–11, 8–11, 3–11
Ho Kwan Kit	0–3	Lin Yun-ju	10–12, 7–11, 5–11
Lam Siu Hang	0–3	Liao Cheng-ting	8–11, 8–11, 8–11

24 September	India	0–3	South Korea

Harmeet Desai	0–3	An Jae-hyun	9–11, 8–11, 9–11
Sathiyan Gnanasekaran	2–3	Park Gang-hyeon	12–10, 11–5, 7–11, 8–11, 6–11
Sharath Kamal	2–3	Oh Jun-sung	11–2, 9–11, 1–11, 11–2, 10–12

24 September	Japan	0–3	Iran

Tomokazu Harimoto	2–3	Nima Alamian	11–8, 5–11, 17–15, 6–11, 14–16
Shunsuke Togami	2–3	Noshad Alamian	11–6, 8–11, 6–11, 13–11, 8–11
Maharu Yoshimura	2–3	Amir Hossein Hodaei	11–4, 11–13, 9–11, 11–9, 10–12

==== Semifinals ====
25 September	China	3–0	Chinese Taipei

Fan Zhendong	3–0	Chuang Chih-yuan	11–6, 11–7, 11–7
Wang Chuqin	3–0	Lin Yun-ju	11–5, 11–5, 11–6
Ma Long	3–0	Liao Cheng-ting	11–4, 11–5, 11–5

25 September	South Korea	3–0	Iran

Lim Jong-hoon	3–2	Nima Alamian	11–8, 11–5, 9–11, 11–13, 11–9
Jang Woo-jin	3–2	Noshad Alamian	9–11, 11–5, 11–4, 8–11, 11–8
Park Gang-hyeon	3–0	Amir Hossein Hodaei	11–9, 11–7, 11–5

==== Final ====
26 September	South Korea	0–3	China

Lim Jong-hoon	1–3	Wang Chuqin	9–11, 11–8, 5–11, 10–12
An Jae-hyun	0–3	Fan Zhendong	6–11, 10–12, 3–11
Park Gang-hyeon	0–3	Ma Long	3–11, 10–12, 6–11

== Non-participating athletes ==
- Lin Gaoyuan (CHN)
- Taisei Matsushita (JPN)
- Mizuki Oikawa (JPN)
- Abdulaziz Bu Shulaybi (KSA)
- Bibishiin Bayarmagnai (MGL)
- Beh Kun Ting (SGP)
- Lucas Tan (SGP)
- Padasak Tanviriyavechakul (THA)
- Lê Đình Đức (VIE)
- Lê Tiến Đạt (VIE)
