= Ju-jitsu at the 2022 Asian Games – Men's 85 kg =

Men's jiu-jitsu 85 kg at the 2022 Asian Games
- Venue: Xiaoshan Linpu Gymnasium
- Dates: 7 October 2023
- Competitors: 26 from 19 nations

Medalists
gold medal	Faisal Al-Ketbi	United Arab Emirates
silver medal	Kim Hee-seoung	South Korea
bronze medal	Omar Nada	Saudi Arabia
bronze medal	Saeed Al-Kubaisi	United Arab Emirates

The men's jiu-jitsu (ne-waza) 85 kilograms Ju-jitsu competition at the 2022 Asian Games in Hangzhou was held on 7 October 2023 at Xiaoshan Linpu Gymnasium.

== Schedule ==
All times are China Standard Time (UTC+08:00)

Date	Time	Event
Saturday, 7 October 2023	09:00	Elimination round of 32
Saturday, 7 October 2023	09:00	Elimination round of 16
Saturday, 7 October 2023	09:00	Quarterfinals
Saturday, 7 October 2023	09:00	Semifinals
Saturday, 7 October 2023	09:00	Repechage round 1
Saturday, 7 October 2023	15:00	Finals

== Results ==
Legend

- SU — Won by submission (50–0)

=== Main bracket ===
==== Final ====
Final
Kim Hee-seoung (KOR)	2
Faisal Al-Ketbi (UAE)	2

==== Top half ====
Elimination round of 32
Uma Maheshwar Reddy (IND)	2
Sooknatee Suntra (THA)	2^{SU}
Wei Chu-cheng (TPE)	6^{SU}
Mahdi Wakili (AFG)	0
Ahmed Al-Quradaghi (QAT)	0
Tee Lip Jin (MAS)	4
Bader Al-Kuzai (JOR)	2^{SU}
Yelzhan Zhumadil (KAZ)	0
Baasandorjiin Ariuntsog (MGL)	0
Aacus Ee (SGP)	13

Elimination round of 16
Saeed Al-Kubaisi (UAE)	6^{SU}
Sooknatee Suntra (THA)	0
Wei Chu-cheng (TPE)	2^{SU}
Tee Lip Jin (MAS)	0
Kim Hee-seoung (KOR)	0
Bader Al-Kuzai (JOR)	0
Aacus Ee (SGP)	2
Abdurahmanhaji Murtazaliev (KGZ)	0^{SU}

Quarterfinals
Saeed Al-Kubaisi (UAE)	0^{SU}
Wei Chu-cheng (TPE)	0
Kim Hee-seoung (KOR)	0
Abdurahmanhaji Murtazaliev (KGZ)	0

Semifinals
Saeed Al-Kubaisi (UAE)	0
Kim Hee-seoung (KOR)	0

==== Bottom half ====
Elimination round of 32
Khushvakht Rakhmikhudoev (TJK)	0
Omar Nada (KSA)	12
Hussein Al-Rasheed (JOR)	0
Ali Akbarpour (IRI)	2
Amarjeet Singh (IND)	0
Bayarkhüügiin Altangerel (MGL)	0
Zhou Xiaoshao (CHN)	2
Mohammad Ali (KUW)	0
Dean Roxas (PHI)	0^{SU}
Chanwit Aunjai (THA)	0

Elimination round of 16
Ruslan Israilov (KAZ)	0
Omar Nada (KSA)	3
Ali Akbarpour (IRI)	0
Ruslan Sagdeev (KGZ)	4
Bayarkhüügiin Altangerel (MGL)	2
Zhou Xiaoshao (CHN)	4
Dean Roxas (PHI)	0
Faisal Al-Ketbi (UAE)	7

Quarterfinals
Omar Nada (KSA)	0
Ruslan Sagdeev (KGZ)	0
Zhou Xiaoshao (CHN)	0
Faisal Al-Ketbi (UAE)	5

Semifinals
Omar Nada (KSA)	0
Faisal Al-Ketbi (UAE)	2

=== Repechage ===
Repechage round 1
Wei Chu-cheng (TPE)	2
Abdurahmanhaji Murtazaliev (KGZ)	2
Ruslan Sagdeev (KGZ)	0
Zhou Xiaoshao (CHN)	0

Contests for bronze medals
Abdurahmanhaji Murtazaliev (KGZ)	4
Omar Nada (KSA)	4
Ruslan Sagdeev (KGZ)	0
Saeed Al-Kubaisi (UAE)	0
