= Kurash at the 2022 Asian Games =

- Venue: Xiaoshan Linpu Gymnasium
- Dates: 30 September – 2 October 2023
- Competitors: 91 from 21 nations

Kurash at the 2022 Asian Games was held at the Xiaoshan Linpu Gymnasium, Hangzhou, China, from 30 September to 2 October 2023.

== Schedule ==
P	Preliminary rounds	F	Semifinals & Final

Event↓/Date →	30th Sat		1st Sun		2nd Mon	
Men's 66 kg	P	F				
Men's 81 kg			P	F		
Men's 90 kg					P	F
Men's +90 kg	P	F				
Women's 52 kg	P	F				
Women's 70 kg			P	F		
Women's 87 kg					P	F

== Medalists ==
=== Men ===
Event	Gold	Silver	Bronze
−66 kg	Artyom Shturbabin; Uzbekistan	Majid Vahid; Iran	Kwon Jae-deog; South Korea
−66 kg	Artyom Shturbabin; Uzbekistan	Majid Vahid; Iran	Khayrandeshi Murodzoda; Tajikistan
−81 kg	Umid Esanov; Uzbekistan	Bekadil Shaimerdenov; Kazakhstan	Huang Chun-ta; Chinese Taipei
−81 kg	Umid Esanov; Uzbekistan	Bekadil Shaimerdenov; Kazakhstan	Hassan Baiqara Rasooli; Afghanistan
−90 kg	Sadegh Azarang; Iran	Kim Min-gyu; South Korea	Khaknazar Nazarov; Tajikistan
−90 kg	Sadegh Azarang; Iran	Kim Min-gyu; South Korea	Işanmyrat Ataýew; Turkmenistan
+90 kg	Mukhsin Khisomiddinov; Uzbekistan	None awarded	Jeong Jun-yong; South Korea
+90 kg	Mukhsin Khisomiddinov; Uzbekistan	None awarded	Kunathip Yea-on; Thailand

=== Women ===
Event	Gold	Silver	Bronze
−52 kg	Khilola Ortikboeva; Uzbekistan	Sitora Elmurodova; Uzbekistan	Aýnur Amanowa; Turkmenistan
−52 kg	Khilola Ortikboeva; Uzbekistan	Sitora Elmurodova; Uzbekistan	Saowalak Homklin; Thailand
−70 kg	Yu Dan; China	Donya Aghaei; Iran	Tsogt-Ochiryn Battsetseg; Mongolia
−70 kg	Yu Dan; China	Donya Aghaei; Iran	Malikakhon Kakhorova; Uzbekistan
−87 kg	Liu Yi; China	Zahra Bagheri; Iran	Melika Omidvand; Iran
−87 kg	Liu Yi; China	Zahra Bagheri; Iran	Võ Thị Phương Quỳnh; Vietnam

== Medal table ==
Rank	Nation	Gold	Silver	Bronze	Total
1	Uzbekistan (UZB)	4	1	1	6
2	China (CHN)	2	0	0	2
3	Iran (IRI)	1	3	1	5
4	South Korea (KOR)	0	1	2	3
5	Kazakhstan (KAZ)	0	1	0	1
6	Tajikistan (TJK)	0	0	2	2
6	Thailand (THA)	0	0	2	2
6	Turkmenistan (TKM)	0	0	2	2
9	Afghanistan (AFG)	0	0	1	1
9	Chinese Taipei (TPE)	0	0	1	1
9	Mongolia (MGL)	0	0	1	1
9	Vietnam (VIE)	0	0	1	1
Totals (12 entries)		7	6	14	27

== Participating nations ==
A total of 91 athletes from 21 nations competed in kurash at the 2022 Asian Games:

- Afghanistan (3)
- China (2)
- Chinese Taipei (6)
- India (6)
- Indonesia (1)
- Iran (6)
- Iraq (2)
- Japan (2)
- Kazakhstan (6)
- Kuwait (3)
- Kyrgyzstan (6)
- Lebanon (3)
- Mongolia (6)
- Philippines (4)
- Saudi Arabia (1)
- South Korea (7)
- Tajikistan (3)
- Thailand (5)
- Turkmenistan (6)
- Uzbekistan (7)
- Vietnam (6)
