= Kurash at the 2022 Asian Games – Men's 66 kg =

Men's 66 kg at the 2022 Asian Games
- Venue: Xiaoshan Linpu Gymnasium
- Dates: 30 September 2023
- Competitors: 14 from 14 nations

Medalists
gold medal	Artyom Shturbabin	Uzbekistan
silver medal	Majid Vahid	Iran
bronze medal	Kwon Jae-deog	South Korea
bronze medal	Khayrandeshi Murodzoda	Tajikistan

The men's 66 kilograms Kurash competition at the 2022 Asian Games in Hangzhou was held on 30 September 2023 at the Xiaoshan Linpu Gymnasium.

Kurash is a traditional martial art from Uzbekistan that resembles Wrestling. There are three assessment system in Kurash, namely Halal, Yambosh, and Chala.

== Schedule ==
All times are China Standard Time (UTC+08:00)

Date	Time	Event
Saturday, 30 September 2023	09:30	Round of 16
Saturday, 30 September 2023	09:30	Quarterfinals
Saturday, 30 September 2023	14:00	Semifinals
Saturday, 30 September 2023	14:00	Final

== Results ==
Round of 16
Ryan Christian Benavidez (PHI)	010
Songwut Kaewpinit (THA)	001
Hussein Raad (IRQ)	001
Şamuhammet Kurbanow (TKM)	100
Kwon Jae-deog (KOR)	111
Keshav (IND)	000
Majid Vahid (IRI)	011
Lê Công Hoàng Hải (VIE)	000
Chan Hao-cheng (TPE)	012
Mahdi Hasan (KUW)	000
Khayrandeshi Murodzoda (TJK)	101
Joe Haddad (LBN)	000

Quarterfinals
Artyom Shturbabin (UZB)	100
Ryan Christian Benavidez (PHI)	000
Şamuhammet Kurbanow (TKM)	000
Kwon Jae-deog (KOR)	011
Majid Vahid (IRI)	011
Chan Hao-cheng (TPE)	001
Khayrandeshi Murodzoda (TJK)	100
Enkhtaivany Enkhbold (MGL)	001

Semifinals
Artyom Shturbabin (UZB)	100
Kwon Jae-deog (KOR)	000
Majid Vahid (IRI)	102
Khayrandeshi Murodzoda (TJK)	000

Final
Artyom Shturbabin (UZB)	011
Majid Vahid (IRI)	000
