= Turkmenistan at the 2022 Asian Games =

Turkmenistan at the multi-sports event

- IOC code: TKM
- NOC: National Olympic Committee of Turkmenistan

in Hangzhou 19 September 2023 – 8 October 2023
- Competitors: 57 in 11 sports
- Flag bearers: Maysa Pardayeva; Merdan Atayev
- Medals Ranked 29th: Gold 0 Silver 1 Bronze 6 Total 7

Asian Games appearances (overview)
- 1994; 1998; 2002; 2006; 2010; 2014; 2018; 2022; 2026

Turkmenistan competed at the 2022 Asian Games in Hangzhou, Zhejiang, China, which was held from 23 September 2023 to 8 October 2023.

== Medal summary ==
=== Medalists ===
Medal	Name	Sport	Event	Date
Bronze	Maysa Pardayeva	Judo	Women's 57 kg	25 Aug

=== Medals by sports ===
Sport	1st place, gold medalist(s)	2nd place, silver medalist(s)	3rd place, bronze medalist(s)	Total
Boxing	0	0	1	1
Judo	0	0	1	1
Karate	0	0	1	1
Kurash	0	1	2	3
Total	0	1	5	6

== Kurash ==
Men

Athlete	Event	Round of 16	Quarter-finals	Semi-finals	Final	
Athlete	Event	Opposition Score	Opposition Score	Opposition Score	Opposition Score	Rank
Shamuhammet Kurbanov	–66 kg	Al-Saedi (IRQ); W 10–3	Kwon (KOR); L 0−8	Did not advance		
Ishanmyrat Atayev	–90 kg	Bye	Bùi (VIE)			
Tejen Tejenov	+90 kg	Zharylgapov (KAZ); W 3−3	Toktogonov (KGZ); W 3−0	Jeong (KOR); W 10−0	Khisomiddinov (UZB); L 0−5	2nd place, silver medalist(s)

Women

Athlete	Event	Round of 32	Round of 16	Quarter-finals	Semi-finals	Final	
Athlete	Event	Opposition Score	Opposition Score	Opposition Score	Opposition Score	Opposition Score	Rank
Aynur Amanova	–52 kg	Phạm (VIE); W 10–0	Rizkianti (INA); W 5–0	Oh (KOR); W 3–0	Ortikboeva (UZB); L 0–10	Did not advance	3rd place, bronze medalist(s)
Ayshirin Haydarova	–52 kg	Balhara (IND); L 0−5	Did not advance				
Jahan Muhammedova	–87 kg	—	Nurlanbek (KAZ)				

== Wushu ==
Sanda

Athlete	Event	Round of 16	Quarter-finals	Semi-finals	Final	
Athlete	Event	Opposition Score	Opposition Score	Opposition Score	Opposition Score	Rank
Agajumageldi Yazymov	Men's –60 kg	Bayadaa (MGL); W FW	Padua (PHI); L 0–2	Did not advance		
Maksat Handurdyyev	Men's –65 kg	Tabugara (PHI); L 1–2	Did not advance			
Mekan Paltayev	Men's –70 kg	Bye	Mohammadseifi (IRI); L 0–2	Did not advance		
Muhammet Jumamyradov	Men's –75 kg	Bye	Cai (MAC); L 0–2	Did not advance		
Aylar Melikova	Men's –52 kg	Bye	Tursyn (KAZ); L PD	Did not advance		
Gozel Rahmedova	Women's –60 kg	—	Mansourian (IRI); L PD	Did not advance		
