= Kurash at the 2022 Asian Games – Women's 70 kg =

Women's 70 kg at the 2022 Asian Games
- Venue: Xiaoshan Linpu Gymnasium
- Dates: 1 October 2023
- Competitors: 13 from 8 nations

Medalists
gold medal	Yu Dan	China
silver medal	Donya Aghaei	Iran
bronze medal	Tsogt-Ochiryn Battsetseg	Mongolia
bronze medal	Malikakhon Kakhorova	Uzbekistan

The women's 70 kilograms Kurash competition at the 2022 Asian Games in Hangzhou was held on 1 October 2023 at the Xiaoshan Linpu Gymnasium.

Kurash is a traditional martial art from Uzbekistan that resembles Wrestling. There are three assessment system in Kurash, namely Halal, Yambosh, and Chala.

== Schedule ==
All times are China Standard Time (UTC+08:00)

Date	Time	Event
Sunday, 1 October 2023	09:30	Round of 16
Sunday, 1 October 2023	09:30	Quarterfinals
Sunday, 1 October 2023	14:00	Semifinals
Sunday, 1 October 2023	14:00	Final

== Results ==
Round of 16
Meerim Momunova (KGZ)	000
Yu Dan (CHN)	102
Lee Wan-ting (TPE)	100
Tahereh Azarpeivand (IRI)	000
An Ye-seul (KOR)	000
Tsogt-Ochiryn Battsetseg (MGL)	100
Dinara Kamchybekova (KGZ)	011
Tsou Chia-wen (TPE)	012
Malikakhon Kakhorova (UZB)	100
Lee Sun-ah (KOR)	000

Quarterfinals
Ravzakhon Adasheva (UZB)	000
Yu Dan (CHN)	100
Lee Wan-ting (TPE)	001
Tsogt-Ochiryn Battsetseg (MGL)	012
Donya Aghaei (IRI)	101
Tsou Chia-wen (TPE)	000
Malikakhon Kakhorova (UZB)	110
Wadyan Al-Mwlld (KSA)	000

Semifinals
Yu Dan (CHN)	002
Tsogt-Ochiryn Battsetseg (MGL)	000
Donya Aghaei (IRI)	011
Malikakhon Kakhorova (UZB)	000

Final
Yu Dan (CHN)	100
Donya Aghaei (IRI)	000
