= Inline freestyle skating at the 2022 Asian Games – Men's speed slalom =

Men's speed slalom at the 2022 Asian Games
- Venue: Qiantang Roller Sports Centre
- Date: 5 October 2023
- Competitors: 17 from 10 nations

Medalists
gold medal	Wang Yu-chun	Chinese Taipei
silver medal	Zhang Hao	China
bronze medal	Huang Pin-ruei	Chinese Taipei

The men's inline speed slalom competition at the 2022 Asian Games took place on 5 October 2023 at Qiantang Roller Sports Centre.

== Schedule ==
All times are China Standard Time (UTC+08:00)

Date	Time	Event
Thursday, 5 October 2023	14:00	Preliminary
Thursday, 5 October 2023	15:07	1/8 finals
Thursday, 5 October 2023	15:40	Quarterfinals
Thursday, 5 October 2023	15:56	Semifinals
Thursday, 5 October 2023	16:02	Finals

== Results ==
Legend

- DSQ — Disqualified

=== Preliminary ===
Rank	Athlete	Run 1	Run 2	Best
1	Huang Pin-ruei (TPE)	4.101	3.885	3.885
2	Wang Yu-chun (TPE)	3.960	3.919	3.919
3	Reza Lesani (IRI)	3.997	3.940	3.940
4	Zhang Hao (CHN)	4.006	4.262	4.006
5	Parnthep Rujirek (THA)	DSQ	4.059	4.059
6	Kwon Neul-chan (KOR)	4.151	4.403	4.151
7	Anson Chan (HKG)	4.302	4.226	4.226
8	Amir Mohammad Savari (IRI)	4.319	4.336	4.319
9	Keenan Brunkard (SGP)	4.468	4.348	4.348
10	Yu Junyan (CHN)	4.372	4.489	4.372
11	Thanatorn Kongpan (THA)	4.482	4.541	4.482
12	Masayoshi Shibagaki (JPN)	4.621	DSQ	4.621
13	Jinesh Satyan Nanal (IND)	4.666	4.692	4.666
14	Taiki Shibagaki (JPN)	4.869	DSQ	4.869
15	Vũ Thành Chung (VIE)	4.949	DSQ	4.949
16	Vishvesh Ganesh Patil (IND)	4.983	DSQ	4.983
17	Lee Chak Him (HKG)	DSQ	5.153	5.153

=== Knockout round ===
==== Finals ====
Final
4	Zhang Hao (CHN)	4.468	DSQ
2	Wang Yu-chun (TPE)	4.416	4.611

Consolation final
1	Huang Pin-ruei (TPE)	4.411	4.373
3	Reza Lesani (IRI)	DSQ	4.398

==== Top half ====
1/8 finals
1	Huang Pin-ruei (TPE)	4.512	4.555
16	Vishvesh Ganesh Patil (IND)	DSQ	DSQ
9	Keenan Brunkard (SGP)	5.037	DSQ
8	Amir Mohammad Savari (IRI)	4.764	4.698
5	Parnthep Rujirek (THA)	4.774	DSQ	4.725
12	Masayoshi Shibagaki (JPN)	5.250	5.170	5.101
13	Jinesh Satyan Nanal (IND)	DSQ	5.301
4	Zhang Hao (CHN)	4.846	4.605

Quarterfinals
1	Huang Pin-ruei (TPE)	4.633	5.092	4.441
8	Amir Mohammad Savari (IRI)	4.669	4.888	4.823
5	Parnthep Rujirek (THA)	4.746	DSQ	DSQ
4	Zhang Hao (CHN)	4.752	4.568	4.706

Semifinals
1	Huang Pin-ruei (TPE)	4.403	4.628	DSQ
4	Zhang Hao (CHN)	4.694	4.456	4.442

==== Bottom half ====
1/8 finals
3	Reza Lesani (IRI)	4.867	4.639
14	Taiki Shibagaki (JPN)	5.751	5.499
11	Thanatorn Kongpan (THA)	5.267	5.297
6	Kwon Neul-chan (KOR)	4.812	4.716
7	Anson Chan (HKG)	5.024	5.223
10	Yu Junyan (CHN)	4.685	4.949
15	Vũ Thành Chung (VIE)	DSQ	5.495
2	Wang Yu-chun (TPE)	4.572	4.477

Quarterfinals
3	Reza Lesani (IRI)	4.631	4.542
6	Kwon Neul-chan (KOR)	DSQ	4.668
10	Yu Junyan (CHN)	4.513	4.702	4.477
2	Wang Yu-chun (TPE)	4.885	4.662	4.411

Semifinals
3	Reza Lesani (IRI)	4.484	5.005
2	Wang Yu-chun (TPE)	4.456	4.406
