= Wushu at the 2022 Asian Games – Men's sanda 60 kg =

Men's sanda 60 kg at the 2022 Asian Games
- Venue: Xiaoshan Guali Sports Centre
- Dates: 24–28 September 2023
- Competitors: 16 from 16 nations

Medalists
gold medal	Wang Xuetao	China
silver medal	Shoja Panahi	Iran
bronze medal	Gideon Fred Padua	Philippines
bronze medal	Kim Min-soo	South Korea

The men's sanda 60 kilograms competition at the 2022 Asian Games in Hangzhou, China was held from 24 to 28 September 2023 at the Xiaoshan Guali Sports Centre.

A total of sixteen competitors from sixteen countries (NOCs) competed in this event, limited to fighters whose body weight was less than 75 kilograms.

Competition bouts consist of 3 rounds in total, each lasting two minutes with a one-minute rest period between rounds. The athlete who scores more points in each round is the winner of that rounds; the bout ends when one athlete has won two rounds (and thus the match).

== Schedule ==
All times are China Standard Time (UTC+08:00)

Date	Time	Event
Sunday, 24 September 2023	19:30	1/8 finals
Monday, 25 September 2023	19:30	1/8 finals
Tuesday, 26 September 2023	19:30	Quarterfinals
Wednesday, 27 September 2023	19:30	Semifinals
Thursday, 28 September 2023	09:30	Final

== Results ==
Legend

- PD — Won by point difference
- WO — Won by walkover

1/8 finals
Agajumageldi Ýazymow (TKM)	WO
Bayadaagiin Mendbayar (MGL)
Gideon Fred Padua (PHI)	2
Ausma Pengthai (THA)	0
Yousef Isskandar (YEM)
Shoja Panahi (IRI)	PD
Mangal Prasad Tharu (NEP)
Askat Omurzakov (KGZ)	PD
Islombek Khaydarov (UZB)	1
Surya Bhanu Pratap Singh (IND)	2
Kim Min-soo (KOR)	2
Pethum Balawardhana (SRI)	1
Bùi Trường Giang (VIE)	2
Bayu Raka Putra (INA)	0
Abdul Khaliq (PAK)
Wang Xuetao (CHN)	PD

Quarterfinals
Agajumageldi Ýazymow (TKM)	0
Gideon Fred Padua (PHI)	2
Shoja Panahi (IRI)	2
Askat Omurzakov (KGZ)	0
Surya Bhanu Pratap Singh (IND)	0
Kim Min-soo (KOR)	2
Bùi Trường Giang (VIE)	0
Wang Xuetao (CHN)	2

Semifinals
Gideon Fred Padua (PHI)
Shoja Panahi (IRI)	WO
Kim Min-soo (KOR)	0
Wang Xuetao (CHN)	2

Final
Shoja Panahi (IRI)	0
Wang Xuetao (CHN)	2
