= Taekwondo at the 2022 Asian Games – Women's individual poomsae =

Taekwondo competition

Women's individual poomsae at the 2022 Asian Games
- Venue: Lin'an Sports and Culture Centre
- Date: 24 September 2023
- Competitors: 16 from 16 nations

Medalists
gold medal	Cha Yea-eun	South Korea
silver medal	Yuiko Niwa	Japan
bronze medal	Chen Hsin-ya	Chinese Taipei
bronze medal	Marjan Salahshouri	Iran

The women's individual poomsae event at the 2022 Asian Games took place on 24 September 2023 at Lin'an Sports and Culture Centre, Hangzhou, China.

Like kyorugi events, the competition was a straight single-elimination tournament. Both semifinal losers were awarded bronze medals. From the preliminary round to the quarterfinals, practitioners performed recognized poomsae routines. From the semifinals and onward, they performed a recognized routine for the first program and then did a freestyle routine for the second program. There were seven judges on the panel, and the average score of the five judges, excluding the highest and the lowest points, was the final score.

== Schedule ==
All times are China Standard Time (UTC+08:00)

Date	Time	Event
Sunday, 24 September 2023	09:00	Round of 16
Sunday, 24 September 2023	14:00	Quarterfinals
Sunday, 24 September 2023	14:00	Semifinals
Sunday, 24 September 2023	14:00	Gold medal contest

== Results ==
Round of 16
Jocel Lyn Ninobla (PHI)	7.56
Cha Yea-eun (KOR)	7.68
Nguyễn Thị Kim Hà (VIE)	7.59
Huda Akbar (QAT)	6.60
Diyanah Aqidah (SGP)	7.60
Swastika Tamang (NEP)	7.25
Pichamon Limpaiboon (THA)	7.63
Chen Hsin-ya (TPE)	7.68
Yuiko Niwa (JPN)	7.46
Cheong Weng Sam (MAC)	7.39
Naila (PAK)	7.34
Abrar Bukhari (KSA)	7.18
Chu Lok Yee (HKG)	7.47
Nurul Hidayah Karim (MAS)	7.70
Ruma Khatun (BAN)	7.07
Marjan Salahshouri (IRI)	7.72

Quarterfinals
Cha Yea-eun (KOR)	7.83
Nguyễn Thị Kim Hà (VIE)	7.82
Diyanah Aqidah (SGP)	7.70
Chen Hsin-ya (TPE)	7.77
Yuiko Niwa (JPN)	7.51
Naila (PAK)	7.15
Nurul Hidayah Karim (MAS)	7.78
Marjan Salahshouri (IRI)	7.78

Semifinals
Cha Yea-eun (KOR)	7.43
Chen Hsin-ya (TPE)	7.17
Yuiko Niwa (JPN)	6.86
Marjan Salahshouri (IRI)	6.44

Gold medal contest
Cha Yea-eun (KOR)	7.54
Yuiko Niwa (JPN)	7.16
