= 2022 Asian Games medal table =

- Medal winners in the men's 400 metres at the 19th Asian Games
- Location: Hangzhou, China

Highlights
- Most gold medals: China 201
- Most total medals: China 383
- Medalling NOCs: 41

The 2022 Asian Games, officially known as the XIX Asian Games, was the largest sporting event in Asia governed by Olympic Council of Asia (OCA). They were held from 23 September to 8 October 2023 in Hangzhou, China, with 481 events in 40 sports and disciplines featured in the Games.

In this edition of the Games, Brunei and Oman won their first ever medals when each country won a silver. India became the fourth nation in the history of Asian Games after Japan, China and South Korea to cross the 100 medal-mark in one edition. The host nation, China, crossed the 200 gold medal mark for the first time in a single edition of the Asian Games, reaching a total of 201 gold medals, becoming the first country in history to do so and surpassing their previous record of 199 golds in the 2010 Guangzhou Summer Asian Games. But on the other hand, China did not break the total medal record that was also held in Guangzhou with 416 medals in total. The mark of 41 NOCs winning medals is the highest for any Asian Games.

== Medal table ==
The ranking in this table is consistent with International Olympic Committee convention in its published medal tables. By default, the table is ordered by the number of gold medals the athletes from a nation have won (in this context, a "nation" is an entity represented by an NOC). The number of silver medals is taken into consideration next and then the number of bronze medals. If nations are still tied, equal ranking is given and they are listed alphabetically by IOC country code.

* Host nation (China)

2022 Asian Games medal table
Rank	Nation	Gold	Silver	Bronze	Total
1	China*	201	111	71	383
2	Japan	52	67	69	188
3	South Korea	42	59	89	190
4	India	28	38	40	106
5	Uzbekistan	22	18	31	71
6	Chinese Taipei	19	20	28	67
7	Iran	13	21	20	54
8	Thailand	12	14	32	58
9	Bahrain	12	3	5	20
10	North Korea	11	18	10	39
11	Kazakhstan	10	22	48	80
12	Hong Kong	8	16	29	53
13	Indonesia	7	11	18	36
14	Malaysia	6	8	18	32
15	Qatar	5	6	3	14
16	United Arab Emirates	5	5	10	20
17	Philippines	4	2	12	18
18	Kyrgyzstan	4	2	9	15
19	Saudi Arabia	4	2	4	10
20	Singapore	3	6	7	16
21	Vietnam	3	5	19	27
22	Mongolia	3	5	13	21
23	Kuwait	3	4	4	11
24	Tajikistan	2	1	4	7
25	Macau	1	3	2	6
26	Sri Lanka	1	2	2	5
27	Myanmar	1	0	2	3
28	Jordan	0	5	4	9
29	Turkmenistan	0	1	6	7
30	Afghanistan	0	1	4	5
31	Pakistan	0	1	2	3
32	Brunei	0	1	1	2
32	Nepal	0	1	1	2
32	Oman	0	1	1	2
35	Iraq	0	0	3	3
35	Laos	0	0	3	3
37	Bangladesh	0	0	2	2
38	Cambodia	0	0	1	1
38	Lebanon	0	0	1	1
38	Palestine	0	0	1	1
38	Syria	0	0	1	1
Totals (41 entries)		482	480	630	1,592

== NOCs without medal ==
- Bhutan (BHU)
- Maldives (MDV)
- Timor-Leste (TLS)
- Yemen (YEM)
