= Inline freestyle skating at the 2022 Asian Games – Women's speed slalom =

Women's speed slalom at the 2022 Asian Games
- Venue: Qiantang Roller Sports Centre
- Date: 5 October 2023
- Competitors: 13 from 8 nations

Medalists
| gold medal | Liu Chiao-hsi | Chinese Taipei |
| silver medal | Taraneh Ahmadi | Iran |
| bronze medal | Ting Yu-en | Chinese Taipei |

The women's inline speed slalom competition at the 2022 Asian Games took place on 5 October 2023 at Qiantang Roller Sports Centre.

== Schedule ==
All times are China Standard Time (UTC+08:00)

| Date | Time | Event |
|---|---|---|
| Thursday, 5 October 2023 | 09:00 | Preliminary |
| Thursday, 5 October 2023 | 09:56 | Quarterfinals |
| Thursday, 5 October 2023 | 10:12 | Semifinals |
| Thursday, 5 October 2023 | 10:22 | Finals |

== Results ==
Legend

- DSQ — Disqualified

=== Preliminary ===
| Rank | Athlete | Run 1 | Run 2 | Best |
|---|---|---|---|---|
| 1 | Romina Salek (IRI) | 4.254 | 4.260 | 4.254 |
| 2 | Taraneh Ahmadi (IRI) | 4.504 | 4.294 | 4.294 |
| 3 | Ting Yu-en (TPE) | 4.294 | 4.510 | 4.294 |
| 4 | Liu Chiao-hsi (TPE) | 4.446 | 4.468 | 4.446 |
| 5 | Nichakan Chinupun (THA) | 4.761 | 4.580 | 4.580 |
| 6 | Hwang Jeong-won (KOR) | 4.739 | 5.156 | 4.739 |
| 7 | Zhu Siyi (CHN) | 4.770 | DSQ | 4.770 |
| 8 | Mika Moritoki (JPN) | 4.950 | 4.853 | 4.853 |
| 9 | Sasikan Kongpan (THA) | 5.246 | 4.883 | 4.883 |
| 10 | Jessica Loo (HKG) | 5.048 | 4.978 | 4.978 |
| 11 | Leung Yuet Ling (HKG) | 5.299 | 5.082 | 5.082 |
| 12 | Merlin Dhanam (IND) | 5.155 | 5.127 | 5.127 |
| 13 | Shreyasi Joshi (IND) | 6.405 | 5.538 | 5.538 |

=== Knockout round ===
Quarterfinals
1 | Romina Salek (IRI) | 5.087 | 5.253
8 | Mika Moritoki (JPN) | 5.405 | 5.347
5 | Nichakan Chinupun (THA) | DSQ | 5.757
4 | Liu Chiao-hsi (TPE) | 4.785 | 4.711
3 | Ting Yu-en (TPE) | 5.003 | 4.969
6 | Hwang Jeong-won (KOR) | 5.156 | DSQ
7 | Zhu Siyi (CHN) | 5.115 | 5.729
2 | Taraneh Ahmadi (IRI) | 4.903 | 4.918

Semifinals
1 | Romina Salek (IRI) | 4.853 | 4.754
4 | Liu Chiao-hsi (TPE) | 4.736 | 4.740
3 | Ting Yu-en (TPE) | 4.855 | 5.083 | 4.821
2 | Taraneh Ahmadi (IRI) | 4.774 | DSQ | 4.747

Final
4 | Liu Chiao-hsi (TPE) | 4.713 | 4.714
2 | Taraneh Ahmadi (IRI) | 4.762 | DSQ
Consolation final
1 | Romina Salek (IRI) | 4.815 | 4.794 | DSQ
3 | Ting Yu-en (TPE) | 4.791 | 4.825 | 5.140
