= Wushu at the 2022 Asian Games – Women's sanda 52 kg =

Women's sanda 52 kg at the 2022 Asian Games
- Venue: Xiaoshan Guali Sports Centre
- Dates: 24–28 September 2023
- Competitors: 9 from 9 nations

Medalists
gold medal	Li Yueyao	China
silver medal	Elaheh Mansourian	Iran
bronze medal	Tharisa Dea Florentina	Indonesia
bronze medal	Ayan Tursyn	Kazakhstan

The women's sanda 52 kilograms competition at the 2022 Asian Games in Hangzhou, China was held from 24 to 28 September 2023 at the Xiaoshan Guali Sports Centre.

A total of nine competitors from nine countries (NOCs) competed in this event, limited to fighters whose body weight was less than 75 kilograms.

Competition bouts consist of 3 rounds in total, each lasting two minutes with a one-minute rest period between rounds. The athlete who scores more points in each round is the winner of that rounds; the bout ends when one athlete has won two rounds (and thus the match).

Li Yueyao from China won the gold medal.

== Schedule ==
All times are China Standard Time (UTC+08:00)

Date	Time	Event
Sunday, 24 September 2023	19:30	1/8 finals
Tuesday, 26 September 2023	19:30	Quarterfinals
Wednesday, 27 September 2023	19:30	Semifinals
Thursday, 28 September 2023	09:30	Final

== Results ==
Legend

- PD — Won by point difference

1/8 finals
Elaheh Mansourian (IRI)	PD
Elina Chaudhary (NEP)

Quarterfinals
Samreen Altaf (PAK)
Elaheh Mansourian (IRI)	PD
Tharisa Dea Florentina (INA)	PD
Lin Yi-ju (TPE)
Nguyễn Thị Ngọc Hiển (VIE)	0
Li Yueyao (CHN)	2
Ayan Tursyn (KAZ)	PD
Aýlar Melikowa (TKM)

Semifinals
Elaheh Mansourian (IRI)	PD
Tharisa Dea Florentina (INA)
Li Yueyao (CHN)	PD
Ayan Tursyn (KAZ)

Final
Elaheh Mansourian (IRI)	0
Li Yueyao (CHN)	2
