= Afghanistan at the 2022 Asian Games =

Afghanistan at the multi-sports event

- Flag of Afghanistan (Note: Afghanistan competes under the tricolor flag used by the Islamic Republic and not the white banner preferred by the Taliban.)
- IOC code: AFG
- NOC: National Olympic Committee of the Islamic Republic of Afghanistan

in Hangzhou 19 September 2023 – 8 October 2023
- Competitors: 83 in 16 sports
- Flag bearers: Kamia Yousufi; Mohsen Rezaee
- Medals Ranked 30th: Gold 0 Silver 1 Bronze 4 Total 5

Asian Games appearances (overview)
- 1951; 1954; 1958; 1962; 1966; 1970; 1974; 1978; 1982; 1986; 1990; 1994; 1998; 2002; 2006; 2010; 2014; 2018; 2022; 2026

Afghanistan competed at the 2022 Asian Games in Hangzhou, Zhejiang, China, which was held from 23 September 2023 to 8 October 2023.

These games marked Afghanistan's best ever performance at the Asian Games with the country winning 5 medals in total.

== Background ==
This was the first time Afghanistan competed in the Asian Games since the Taliban takeover of the country following the fall of Kabul in 2021.

The Afghanistan delegation consisted of two groups, an all-male contingent backed by the Taliban and another supported by Hafizullah Wali Rahimi, who was president of the Afghanistan National Olympic Committee prior to the Taliban takeover. The latter group were from the Afghan diaspora and included women. Their chef de mission was Khwaja Hashmatullah Rasa. The Taliban rejected Afghanistan's entire participation with women athletes in the games at all.

Afghanistan competed under the Islamic Republic tricolor flag, instead of the white banner preferred by the Taliban. The contingent at the opening ceremony included women, with Mohsen Rezaee and Kamia Yousufi as flagbearers.

== Medal summary ==
=== Medalists ===
The following Afghanistan competitors won medals at the Games.

Medal	Name	Sport	Event	Date
Silver	Afghanistan national cricket team	Cricket	Men's tournament	7 Oct
Bronze	Mohsen Rezaee	Taekwondo	Men's 58 kg	25 Sep
Bronze	Khalid Hotak	Wushu	Men's sanda 70 kg	27 Sep
Bronze	Nasratullah Habibi	Wushu	Men's sanda 75 kg	27 Sep
Bronze	Baiqara Rasooli	Kurash	Men's 81 kg	1 Oct

=== Medals by sports ===
Sport	1st place, gold medalist(s)	2nd place, silver medalist(s)	3rd place, bronze medalist(s)	Total
Cricket	0	1	0	0
Kurash	0	0	1	1
Taekwondo	0	0	1	1
Wushu	0	0	2	2
Total	0	1	4	4

Medals by day
Day	Date	1st place, gold medalist(s)	2nd place, silver medalist(s)	3rd place, bronze medalist(s)	Total
1	September 24	0	0	0	0
2	September 25	0	0	1	1
3	September 26	0	0	0	0
4	September 27	0	0	2	2
5	September 28	0	0	0	0
6	September 29	0	0	0	0
7	September 30	0	0	0	0
8	October 1	0	0	1	1
9	October 2	0	0	0	0
10	October 3	0	0	0	0
11	October 4	0	0	0	0
12	October 5	0	0	0	0
13	October 6	0	0	0	0
14	October 7	0	1	0	1
15	October 8	0	0	0	0

== Competitors ==
Sport	Men	Women	Total
Athletics	1	1	2
Boxing	3	0	3
Canoeing	1	0	1
Cricket	15	0	15
Cycling	0	2	2
Judo	2	0	2
Ju-jitsu	3	0	3
Karate	2	0	2
Kurash	3	0	3
Rugby sevens	12	0	12
Swimming	1	0	1
Taekwondo	5	0	5
Volleyball	12	12	24
Weightlifting	1	0	1
Wrestling	3	0	3
Wushu	4	0	4
Total	68	15	83

== Cricket ==
=== Men's tournament ===
Squad

- Gulbadin Naib (c)
- Mohammad Shahzad (vc, wk)
- Fareed Ahmad
- Qais Ahmad
- Zubaid Akbari
- Sharafuddin Ashraf
- Sediqullah Atal
- Karim Janat
- Zahir Khan
- Nijat Masood
- Shahidullah
- Sayed Shirzad
- Wafiullah Tarakhil
- Noor Ali Zadran
- Afsar Zazai (wk)

== Football ==
The national under-23 football team withdrew from the men's tournament before matches started.

Summary

Key:

- A.E.T – After extra time.
- P – Match decided by penalty-shootout.

Team	Event	Group Stage				Quarterfinals	Semifinals	Final / BM	
Team	Event	Opposition Score	Opposition Score	Opposition Score	Rank	Opposition Score	Opposition Score	Opposition Score	Rank
Afghanistan men's under-23	Men's tournament	Uzbekistan; WD	~~Syria~~; WD	Hong Kong; WD	—	Withdrew			

== Volleyball ==
Summary

Team	Event	Group stage				Quarterfinals	Semifinals	Final / BM
Team	Event	Opposition Score	Opposition Score	Opposition Score	Rank	Opposition Score	Opposition Score	Opposition Score
Afghanistan men's	Men's tournament	Japan; L 0–3	Philippines; L 0–3	Indonesia; L 0–3	4	Did not advance		
Afghanistan women's	Women's tournament	Kazakhstan; L 0–3	Japan; L 0–3	Hong Kong; L 0–3	4	Did not advance		

=== Men's tournament ===
Squad

- Mohammad Sabawoon Wardak
- Abdul Mutalib Mohammadi
- Mohammad Imran Niazai
- Mohammad Shahid Badloon
- Sabawoon Ghorzang
- Besmaullah Sultani
- Sayed Habib Yousufi
- Abdul Malik Mamoozai
- Ozair Mohammad Asefi
- Gulam Rasool Haidari
- Allah Nazar Karimy
- Naser Kohistani

== Wushu ==
Sanda

Athlete	Event	Round of 16	Quarter-finals	Semi-finals	Final	
Athlete	Event	Opposition Score	Opposition Score	Opposition Score	Opposition Score	Rank
Mohammad Karim Faqiri	Men's –56 kg	Guitara (INA); L 1–2	Did not advance			
Majid Rasoli	Men's –65 kg	Jeon (KOR); L 0–2	Did not advance			
Khalid Hotak	Men's –70 kg	Izmurzayev (KAZ); W 2–0	Yadav (IND); W KO	He (CHN); L 0–2	Did not advance	3rd place, bronze medalist(s)
Nasratullah Habibi	Men's –75 kg	Bye	Saophanao (THA); W 2–0	Sabriabibegloo (IRI); L PD	Did not advance	3rd place, bronze medalist(s)
