= Milad Jabbari =

Iranian kabaddi player

Personal information
- Nationality: Iranian
- Born: 12 February 2001 (age 25)
- Height: 185 cm (6 ft 1 in)
- Weight: 83 kg (183 lb)

Sport
- Country: Iran
- Sport: Kabaddi
- Position: defender
- League: Pro Kabaddi League
- Club: Telugu Titans
- Team: Iran national kabaddi team
Medal record
Men's Kabaddi
Representing Iran
Asian Games
Silver medal – second place	2022 Hangzhou	Team

Milad Jabbari (born 12 February 2001) is an Iranian professional kabaddi player represents Iran in international matches and also currently plays for Puneri Paltan in the Indian Pro Kabaddi League.

== Career ==
He was part of the Iranian team which claimed silver in the men's team event at the 2023 Asian Kabaddi Championship.
