= Kurash at the 2022 Asian Games – Women's 87 kg =

Women's 87 kg at the 2022 Asian Games
- Venue: Xiaoshan Linpu Gymnasium
- Dates: 2 October 2023
- Competitors: 10 from 8 nations

Medalists
gold medal	Liu Yi	China
silver medal	Zahra Bagheri	Iran
bronze medal	Melika Omidvand	Iran
bronze medal	Võ Thị Phương Quỳnh	Vietnam

The women's 87 kilograms Kurash competition at the 2022 Asian Games in Hangzhou was held on 2 October 2023 at the Xiaoshan Linpu Gymnasium.

Kurash is a traditional martial art from Uzbekistan that resembles Wrestling. There are three assessment system in Kurash, namely Halal, Yambosh, and Chala.

== Schedule ==
All times are China Standard Time (UTC+08:00)

Date	Time	Event
Monday, 2 October 2023	09:30	Round of 16
Monday, 2 October 2023	09:30	Quarterfinals
Monday, 2 October 2023	14:00	Semifinals
Monday, 2 October 2023	14:00	Final

== Results ==
Round of 16
Albina Bakhiyeva (KAZ)	010
Yang Hsien-tzu (TPE)	001
Moldir Nurlanbek (KAZ)	000
Jahan Muhammedowa (TKM)	010

Quarterfinals
Liu Yi (CHN)	001
Albina Bakhiyeva (KAZ)	000
Jyoti Tokas (IND)	000
Melika Omidvand (IRI)	003
Zahra Bagheri (IRI)	010
Ulanai Salieva (KGZ)	000
Jahan Muhammedowa (TKM)	000
Võ Thị Phương Quỳnh (VIE)	110

Semifinals
Liu Yi (CHN)	011
Melika Omidvand (IRI)	001
Zahra Bagheri (IRI)	003
Võ Thị Phương Quỳnh (VIE)	001

Final
Liu Yi (CHN)	002
Zahra Bagheri (IRI)	000
