= Nasratullah Habibi =

Afghan wushu practitioner

Personal information
- Nationality: Afghan
- Born: 27 October 1992 (age 33)
- Height: 1.75 m (5 ft 9 in)

Sport
- Sport: Wushu
- Event: Sanda
- Coached by: Mahfooz Wafaa
Medal record
Men's sanda
Representing Afghanistan
Asian Games
Bronze medal – third place	2022 Hangzhou	75 kg

Nasratullah Habibi (born 27 October 1992) is an Afghan wushu practitioner. He represented Afghanistan and won a bronze medal at the 2022 Asian Games in the men's sanda 75 kg category. Habibi owns three wushu clubs.

== Career ==
In 2015, Habibi won a silver medal at the West Asia Wushu Championship. In the 2018 Asian Games, he competed in the men's sanda 70 kg.
