= Iraq at the 2022 Asian Games =

Iraq at the multi-sports event

- IOC code: IRQ
- NOC: National Olympic Committee of Iraq

in Hangzhou 19 September 2023 – 8 October 2023
- Competitors: 33 in 12 sports
- Medals Ranked 35th: Gold 0 Silver 0 Bronze 3 Total 3

Asian Games appearances (overview)
- 1974; 1978; 1982; 1986; 1990–2002; 2006; 2010; 2014; 2018; 2022; 2026

Iraq competed at the 2022 Asian Games in Hangzhou, Zhejiang, China, which was held from 23 September 2023 to 8 October 2023.

== Medal summary ==
=== Medalists ===
The following Iraqi competitors won medals at the Games.

Medal	Name	Sport	Event	Date
Bronze	Saif Al-Rammahi	Taekwondo	Men's 80 kg	27 Sep
Bronze	Ali Qasim Hamdan Al-Sarray	Boxing	Men's 63.5 kg	3 Oct

=== Medals by sports ===
Sport	1st place, gold medalist(s)	2nd place, silver medalist(s)	3rd place, bronze medalist(s)	Total
Boxing	0	0	1	1
Taekwondo	0	0	1	1
Total	0	0	2	2

== Competitors ==
Sport	Men	Women	Total
Archery	1	1	2
Athletics	6	0	6
Boxing	1	0	1
Canoeing	5	0	5
Fencing	3	0	3
Judo	1	0	1
Ju-jitsu	2	0	2
Karate	3	0	3
Kurash	2	0	2
Rowing	4	0	4
Taekwondo	2	0	2
Weightlifting	2	0	2
Total	32	1	33
