= Bahrain at the 2022 Asian Games =

Bahrain at the multi-sports event

- IOC code: BRN
- NOC: Bahrain Olympic Committee

in Hangzhou 19 September 2023 – 8 October 2023
- Competitors: 143 in 17 sports
- Medals Ranked 8th: Gold 12 Silver 3 Bronze 5 Total 20

Asian Games appearances (overview)
- 1974; 1978; 1982; 1986; 1990; 1994; 1998; 2002; 2006; 2010; 2014; 2018; 2022; 2026

Bahrain competed at the 2022 Asian Games in Hangzhou, China, from 23 September to 8 October 2023. Competitors from the country bagged a total of 20 medals, including 12 gold medals, mainly in athletics.

== Medal summary ==
=== Medals by sports ===
| Sport | 1st place, gold medalist(s) | 2nd place, silver medalist(s) | 3rd place, bronze medalist(s) | Total |
| Athletics | 10 | 2 | 5 | 17 |
| Handball | 0 | 1 | 0 | 1 |
| Wrestling | 1 | 0 | 0 | 1 |
| Weightlifting | 1 | 0 | 0 | 1 |
| Total | 12 | 3 | 5 | 20 |
