= Yemen at the 2022 Asian Games =

- IOC code: YEM
- NOC: Yemen Olympic Committee

in Hangzhou, China 23 September 2023 – 8 October 2023
- Competitors: 18 (8 men and 10 women) in 8 sports
- Flag bearers: Omar Ahmed Ahmed Ali; Yasameen Nabil Mohammed Alraimi
- Medals: Gold 0 Silver 0 Bronze 0 Total 0

Asian Games appearances (overview)
- 1990; 1994; 1998; 2002; 2006; 2010; 2014; 2018; 2022; 2026

Other related appearances
- North Yemen (1982, 1986); South Yemen (1982)

Yemen competed at the 2022 Asian Games in Hangzhou, Zhejiang, China, which began on 23 September 2023 and ends on 8 October 2023. The event was scheduled to be held in September 2022 but was postponed due to the rising COVID-19 cases in China. The event was later rescheduled to be held in September–October 2023.

== Wushu ==
Sanda

| Athlete | Event | Round of 16 | Quarter-finals | Semi-finals | Final | |
| Athlete | Event | Opposition Score | Opposition Score | Opposition Score | Opposition Score | Rank |
|---|---|---|---|---|---|---|
| Tharwt Mahyoub Ali Naji Alsendi | Men's –56 kg | Hong (KOR); L 0–2 | Did not advance | | | |
| Yousef Ahmed Saad Isskandar | Men's –60 kg | Panahi (IRI); L PD | Did not advance | | | |
