= Maldives at the 2022 Asian Games =

- IOC code: MDV
- NOC: Maldives Olympic Committee

in Hangzhou, China 23 September 2023 – 8 October 2023
- Competitors: 75 (24 men and 51 women) in 9 sports
- Flag bearers: Imaan Ali; Shameem Fathimath E Hau
- Medals: Gold 0 Silver 0 Bronze 0 Total 0

Asian Games appearances (overview)
- 1982; 1986; 1990; 1994; 1998; 2002; 2006; 2010; 2014; 2018; 2022; 2026

Maldives competed at the 2022 Asian Games in Hangzhou, Zhejiang, China, which began on 23 September 2023 and ended on 8 October 2023. The event was scheduled to be held in September 2022 but was postponed due to the rising COVID-19 cases in China. The event was later rescheduled to be held in September–October 2023.

Maldives could not win a medal at the games.
