= Mongolia at the 2022 Asian Games =

- IOC code: MGL
- NOC: Mongolian Olympic Committee

in Hangzhou, China 23 September 2023 – 8 October 2023
- Medals Ranked 22nd: Gold 2 Silver 5 Bronze 11 Total 18

Asian Games appearances (overview)
- 1974; 1978; 1982; 1986; 1990; 1994; 1998; 2002; 2006; 2010; 2014; 2018; 2022; 2026

Mongolia competed at the 2022 Asian Games in Hangzhou, Zhejiang, China, which began on 23 September 2023 and ended on 8 October 2023. The event was scheduled to be held in September 2022 but was postponed due to the rising COVID-19 cases in China. The event was later rescheduled to be held in September–October 2023.

== Medalists ==
=== Medals by sport ===
Medals by sport
Sport	Gold	Silver	Bronze	Total
Archery	1	0	0	1
Boxing	0	0	1	1
Judo	0	2	4	6
Basketball	0	1	1	2
Esports	0	1	0	1
Kurash	0	0	1	1
Shooting	0	0	1	1
Wrestling	1	1	3	5
Total	2	5	11	18
