= Iran at the 2026 Asian Games =

- IOC code: IRI
- NOC: National Olympic Committee of the Islamic Republic of Iran

in Aichi–Nagoya, Japan September 19 – October 4, 2026
- Competitors: 302 in 35 sports
- Flag bearers: Zahra Kiani; Fazel Atrachali
- Medals Ranked 6th: Gold 19 Silver 18 Bronze 15 Total 52

Asian Games appearances (overview)
- 1951; 1954; 1958; 1962; 1966; 1970; 1974; 1978; 1982; 1986; 1990; 1994; 1998; 2002; 2006; 2010; 2014; 2018; 2022; 2026

Iran competed at the 2026 Asian Games in Aichi Prefecture and Nagoya, Japan from September 19 to October 4, 2026.

== Competitors ==
The following is a list of the number of competitors representing Iran that will participate at the Asian Games:

Sport	Men	Women	Total
3x3 basketball	4	4	8
Archery	6	4	10
Athletics	7	4	11
Badminton	1	1	2
Basketball	12		12
Beach volleyball	4		4
Boxing	5	2	7
Canoe sprint	3	5	8
Cycling	1	1	2
Diving	2		2
Equestrian		1	1
Esports	3		3
Fencing	4	1	5
Football	23		23
Golf	1	1	2
Gymnastics artistic	5	1	6
Gymnastics trampoline	2	2	4
Handball	16		16
Judo	3	3	6
Ju-jitsu	1	2	3
Kabaddi	12	12	24
Karate	3	5	8
Kurash	3	4	7
Mixed martial arts	2	1	3
Padel	4	4	8
Rowing	2	9	11
Sailing	1		1
Shooting	7	7	14
Skateboarding	1		1
Sport climbing	1	1	2
Squash	1	3	4
Surfing	1		1
Swimming	4		4
Table tennis	5	2	7
Taekwondo	5	5	10
Tennis	2	2	4
Triathlon	1		1
Volleyball	12		12
Water polo	15		15
Weightlifting	4	2	6
Wrestling	12		12
Wushu	7	5	12
Total	208	94	302

== Medal Summary ==
=== Medals by sport ===
Sport	Gold	Silver	Bronze	Total
3x3 basketball			1	1
Athletics	1	2	1	4
Basketball			1	1
Boxing			1	1
Canoe sprint			1	1
Esports	1			1
Fencing			1	1
Gymnastics artistic		2		2
Kabaddi		2		2
Karate	2	3		5
Kurash	1	1	1	3
Padel			1	1
Rowing	2	3	1	6
Shooting			1	1
Sport climbing		1		1
Table tennis			1	1
Taekwondo	2	1	1	4
Volleyball	1			1
Weightlifting	2		2	4
Wrestling	6		1	7
Wushu	1	3		4
Total	19	18	15	52

=== Medalists ===
Medal	Name	Sport	Event
Gold	Mohammad Reza Tayebi	Athletics	Men's shot put
Gold	Hassan Pajani; Abolfazl Aghaeinasab	Esports	Open eFootball
Gold	Morteza Nemati	Karate	Men's kumite 75 kg
Gold	Mahmoud Nemati	Karate	Men's kumite +84 kg
Gold	Majid Vahid	Kurash	Men's 66 kg
Gold	Fatemeh Mojallal	Rowing	Women's lightweight single sculls
Gold	Kimia Zareei; Zeinab Norouzi	Rowing	Women's lightweight double sculls
Gold	Arian Salimi	Taekwondo	Men's +80 kg
Gold	Saghar Moradi	Taekwondo	Women's 67 kg
Gold	Arshia Behnezhad; Ilshan Davoodipour; Amin Esmaeilnezhad; Morteza Sharifi; Pouria Hossein Khanzadeh; Ali Haghparast; Mobin Nasri; Mohammad Valizadeh; Yousef Kazemi; Seyed Eisa Naseri; Hossein Haji Kalateh; Ali Hajipour	Volleyball	Men
Gold	Ali Alipour	Weightlifting	Men's 95 kg
Gold	Ali Davoudi	Weightlifting	Men's +110 kg
Gold	Younes Emami	Wrestling	Men's freestyle 74 kg
Gold	Mohammad Nokhodi	Wrestling	Men's freestyle 86 kg
Gold	Amir Ali Azarpira	Wrestling	Men's freestyle 97 kg
Gold	Amir Hossein Zare	Wrestling	Men's freestyle 125 kg
Gold	Alireza Abdevali	Wrestling	Men's Greco-Roman 77 kg
Gold	Amin Mirzazadeh	Wrestling	Men's Greco-Roman 130 kg
Gold	Soheil Mousavi	Wushu	Men's sanda 75 kg
Silver	Ali Amirian	Athletics	Men's 800 m
Silver	Zahra Zareei	Athletics	Women's 400 m
Silver	Arman Khodaei	Gymnastics artistic	Men's pommel horse
Silver	Mehdi Olfati	Gymnastics artistic	Men's vault
Silver	Fazel Atrachali; Mohammad Reza Shadloui; Amir Hossein Ejlali; Omid Khojasteh; Ali Samadi; Amir Hossein Bastami; Alireza Mirzaiean; Mohammad Esmaeil Nabibakhsh; Reza Mirbagheri; Amir Mohammad Zafardanesh; Amir Reza Aliakbari; Amir Hossein Taghipour	Kabaddi	Men
Silver	Mahtab Lakaliabadi; Zahra Astereki; Saniya Naeimi; Hadiseh Varasteh; Nikta Jalalvand; Zahra Khodabandehloo; Zakiyeh Malmali; Aynaz Faramarzi; Atena Madadi; Zahra Karimi; Fareshte Kolagar; Sahar Yari	Kabaddi	Women
Silver	Ali Asghar Asiabari	Karate	Men's kumite 84 kg
Silver	Sepideh Amini; Zeinab Hosseini; Fatemeh Sadeghi	Karate	Women's team kata
Silver	Fatemeh Zahra Saeidabadi	Karate	Women's kumite 55 kg
Silver	Ramin Ahmadzadeh	Kurash	Men's 81 kg
Silver	Amir Hossein Mahmoudpour	Rowing	Men's lightweight single sculls
Silver	Kimia Zareei; Zeinab Norouzi	Rowing	Women's double sculls
Silver	Hengameh Kamyab; Soha Fakhri; Mahsa Javer; Saghi Maleki	Rowing	Women's quadruple sculls
Silver	Reza Alipour	Sport climbing	Men's speed
Silver	Mehdi Haji Mousaei	Taekwondo	Men's 68 kg
Silver	Shoja Panahi	Wushu	Men's sanda 65 kg
Silver	Erfan Moharrami	Wushu	Men's sanda 70 kg
Silver	Sogand Sinkaei	Wushu	Women's sanda 52 kg
Bronze	Mohammadmahdi Rahimi; Mohammadbasir Momeni; Sarem Jafari; Seyedmohammad Ghafari	3x3 basketball	Men
Bronze	Sadegh Samimi	Athletics	Men's discus throw
Bronze	Piter Girgoorian; Alireza Sharifi; Mobin Sheikhi; Navid Rezaeifar; Khashayar Aliakbari; Mohammad Heydari; Arman Zangeneh; Mohammad Jamshidi; Arsalan Kazemi; Matin Aghajanpour; Salar Monji; Mahdi Jafari	Basketball	Men
Bronze	Amir Esmaeili	Boxing	Men's +90 kg
Bronze	Ali Aghamirzaei; Peyman Ghavidel	Canoe sprint	Men's K-2 500 m
Bronze	Ali Pakdaman	Fencing	Men's individual sabre
Bronze	Fatemeh Barmaki	Kurash	Women's +87 kg
Bronze	Farsad Shahi; Amir Mohammad Jamshidi	Padel	Men's pairs
Bronze	Fatemeh Mojallal	Rowing	Women's single sculls
Bronze	Vahid Golkhandan; Hanieh Rostamian	Shooting	Mixed 10 m air pistol team
Bronze	Noshad Alamian	Table tennis	Men's singles
Bronze	Fatemeh Ahmadi	Taekwondo	Women +67 kg
Bronze	Reihaneh Karimi	Weightlifting	Women's 77 kg
Bronze	Mahsa Beheshti	Weightlifting	Women's 86 kg
Bronze	Mehdi Bali	Wrestling	Men's Greco-Roman 97 kg

== Results by event ==
=== Aquatics ===
==== Diving ====
Athlete	Event	Preliminary		Final	
Athlete	Event	Score	Rank	Score	Rank
Mohammad Moghaddasi	Men's 1 m springboard	—N/a		253.90	9
Sam Vajir	Men's 1 m springboard	—N/a		344.40	4
Mohammad Moghaddasi	Men's 3 m springboard	238.85	16	Did not advance	
Sam Vajir	Men's 3 m springboard	343.30	9 Q	345.65	10
Mohammad Moghaddasi	Men's 10 m platform	241.70	10 Q	247.90	10
Sam Vajir	Men's 10 m platform	DNS	—	Did not advance	
Sam Vajir; Mohammad Moghaddasi	Men's synchronized 3 m springboard	—N/a		291.45	8
Sam Vajir; Mohammad Moghaddasi	Men's synchronized 10 m platform	—N/a		272.70	5

==== Swimming ====
Athlete	Event	Heats		Final	
Athlete	Event	Time	Rank	Time	Rank
Mohammad Ghasemi	Men's 100 m Freestyle	51.86	26	Did not Advance	
Mohammad Ghasemi	Men's 200 m Freestyle	1:53.39	23	Did not Advance	
Mohammad Ghasemi	Men's 400 m Freestyle	4:05.87	10	Did not Advance	
Samyar Abdoli	Men's 50 m Freestyle	22.44	11	Did not Advance	
Samyar Abdoli	Men's 50 m breaststroke	28.53	8	Did not Advance	
Amir Motaei	Men's 50 m breaststroke	27.28	3 Q	27.46	6
Amir Motaei	Men's 100 m breaststroke	1:00.66	8 Q	1:00.57	7
Homer Abbasi	Men's 50 m backstroke	25.37	9 Q	25.23	7
Homer Abbasi	Men's 100 m backstroke	56.62	15	Did not Advance	
Homer Abbasi; Samyar Abdoli; Mohammad Ghasemi; Amir Motaei	Men's 4 × 100 m medley relay	3:43.20	12	Did not Advance	

==== Water polo ====
Team	Event	Preliminary round				Quarterfinal	Semifinal	Final / BM	Rank
Team	Event	Round 1	Round 2	Round 3	Rank	Quarterfinal	Semifinal	Final / BM	Rank
Iran	Men	Singapore; W 19–8	China; L 8–12	South Korea; W 15–11	2	Hong Kong; W 21–12	Japan; L 12–26	China; L 9–13	4
Roster: Hamed Karimi; Omid Aaghaei; Alireza Mehri; Farbod Sabouri; Mersad Adham; Ashkan Iranpour; Peyman Asadi; Mehdi Yazdankhah; Amir Reza Jalilpour; Arman Shams; Seyed Erfan Sadrnia; Amirata Khazaei; Mehdi Barzegari; Coach: Mehdi Panamtash

=== Archery ===
Recurve

Athlete	Event	Ranking round		Round of 64	Round of 32	Round of 16	Quarterfinal	Semifinal	Final	Rank
Athlete	Event	Score	Rank	Round of 64	Round of 32	Round of 16	Quarterfinal	Semifinal	Final	Rank
Sadegh Ashrafi	Men's individual	664	26	Did not Advance						42
Mohammad Hossein Golshani	Men's individual	682	8 Q	Bye	Dorji (BHU); L 4-6	Did not Advance				17
Reza Shabani	Men's individual	672	22 Q	Bye	Funahashi (JPN); W 6-2	Lee (KOR); L 5-6	Did not Advance			9
Sadegh Ashrafi; Mohammad Hossein Golshani; Reza Shabani	Men's team	2018	6 Q	—N/a	Bye	Bangladesh; W 5–4	Japan; W 5–3	India; L 0–6	Chinese Taipei; L 2–6	4
Mobina Fallah	Women's individual	646	23 Q	Bye	Ohta (JPN); W 6-4	Asakuno (JPN); L 2-6	Did not Advance			9
Mohammad Hossein Golshani; Mobina Fallah	Mixed team	1328	10 Q	—N/a	Bye	Vietnam; L 2-6	Did not Advance			9

Compound

Athlete	Event	Ranking round		Round of 64	Round of 32	Round of 16	Quarterfinal	Semifinal	Final	Rank
Athlete	Event	Score	Rank	Round of 64	Round of 32	Round of 16	Quarterfinal	Semifinal	Final	Rank
Farhang Khodaparast	Men's individual	701	20 Q	—N/a	Mussa (KAZ); L 146-146	Did not Advance				17
Armin Pakzad	Men's individual	701	21	Did not Advance						32
Milad Rashidi	Men's individual	703	18 Q	—N/a	Rakib (BAN); L 145-146	Did not Advance				17
Farhang Khodaparast; Armin Pakzad; Milad Rashidi	Men's team	2105	7 Q	—N/a		Bangladesh; W 232-232	South Korea; L 234-239	Did not Advance		5
Bita Asheghzadeh	Women's individual	704	2 Q	Bye	Tayabally (SRI); W 146-140	Akter (BAN); W 144-143	Cojuangco (PHI); L 135-146	Did not Advance		5
Shiva Bakhtiari	Women's individual	688	32	Did not Advance						39
Geesa Bybordi	Women's individual	695	21 Q	Bye	Akter (BAN); L 143-147	Did not Advance				17
Bita Asheghzadeh; Shiva Bakhtiari; Geesa Bybordi	Women's team	2087	6 Q	—N/a		Thailand; L 231-231	Did not Advance			9
Geesa Bybordi; Armin Pakzad	Mixed team	1407	6 Q	—N/a		Bangladesh; W 158-154	South Korea; L 158-158	Did not Advance		5

=== Athletics ===
Track and Field Events

Athlete	Event	Round 1		Semifinal		Final	Rank
Athlete	Event	Time	Rank	Time	Rank	Time / Result	Rank
Hassan Taftian	Men's 100 m	10.46	3 Q	10.33	4	Did not Advance	12
Benyamin Yousefi	Men's 200 m	21.21	5 q	21.20	6	Did not Advance	16
Ali Amirian	Men's 800 m	1:47.26	1 Q	—N/a		1:45.10	2nd place, silver medalist(s)
Hossein Nouri	Men's 1500 m	3:50.13	10	Did not Advance			18
Hassan Ajami	Men's shot put	—N/a				19.37 m	5
Mohammad Reza Tayebi	Men's shot put	—N/a				20.81 m	1st place, gold medalist(s)
Sadegh Samimi	Men's discus throw	—N/a				60.32 m	3rd place, bronze medalist(s)
Zahra Zareei	Women's 200 m	23.64	4	Did not Advance			10
Zahra Zareei	Women's 400 m	52.00	1 Q	—N/a		52.38	2nd place, silver medalist(s)
Reihaneh Mobini	Women's long jump	—N/a				6.16 m	8
Maryam Kazemi	Women's triple jump	—N/a				12.68 m	13
Hassan Taftian; Benyamin Yousefi; Zahra Zareei; Reihaneh Mobini	Mixed 4 × 100 m relay	DNF		Did not Advance			

Combined Events

Athlete	Event	Category	100H	HJ	SP	200 m	LJ	JT	800 m	Total	Rank
Fatemeh Mohitizadeh	Heptathlon	Result	13.64	1.77	11.72	25.16	DQ				
Fatemeh Mohitizadeh	Heptathlon	Points	1030	941	643	872	DQ				

=== Badminton ===
Athlete	Event	Round of 64	Round of 32	Round of 16	Quarterfinal	Semifinal	Final	Rank
Nima Rostampour	Men's singles	Khanal (NEP); W 2–0	Naraoka (JPN); L 0–2	Did not Advance				17
Aysan Shourideh	Women's singles	Naraoka (JPN); L 0–2	Did not Advance					33

=== Basketball ===
==== 3x3 ====
Team	Event	Group Stage				Quarterfinals	Semifinals	Final / BM	
Team	Event	Opposition Score	Opposition Score	Opposition Score	Rank	Opposition Score	Opposition Score	Opposition Score	Rank
Iran men's	Men's 3x3 tournament	China; W 18–15	Hong Kong; W 16–11	Malaysia; W 21–7	1 Q	Japan; W 21–3	Qatar; L 11–14	Philippines; W 21–10	3rd place, bronze medalist(s)
Iran women's	Women's 3x3 tournament	Uzbekistan; W 19–5	Japan; W 18–16	Chinese Taipei; W 13–8	1 Q	Thailand; L 11–12	Did not Advance		6

==== 5x5 ====
Team	Event	Group Stage				Quarterfinals	Semifinals	Final / BM	
Team	Event	Opposition Score	Opposition Score	Opposition Score	Rank	Opposition Score	Opposition Score	Opposition Score	Rank
Iran men's	Men's 5x5 tournament	Qatar; L 53–59	Chinese Taipei; W 72–69	Jordan; W 81–68	1 Q	Bahrain; W 79–74	South Korea; L 51–77	China; W 79–70	3rd place, bronze medalist(s)
Roster: Piter Girgoorian; Alireza Sharifi; Mobin Sheikhi; Navid Rezaeifar; Khashayar Aliakbari; Mohammad Heydari; Arman Zangeneh; Mohammad Jamshidi; Arsalan Kazemi; Matin Aghajanpour; Salar Monji; Mahdi Jafari; Coach: (Greece) Sotirios Manolopoulos

=== Boxing ===
Athlete	Event	Round of 32	Round of 16	Quarterfinal	Semifinal	Final	Rank
Mehdi Kazemi	Men's 55 kg	So (PRK); W 4–1	Sabyrkhan (KAZ); L 0–5	Did not advance			9
Danial Shahbakhsh	Men's 60 kg	Udin (INA); W 5–0	Ruamtham (THA); L 1–4	Did not advance			9
Ali Habibinejad	Men's 70 kg	Li (CHN); L 2–3	Did not advance				17
Sam Esteki	Men's 90 kg	—N/a	Pokhariya (IND); L 0–5	Did not advance			9
Amir Esmaeili	Men's +90 kg	—N/a	Ju (KOR); W RSC	Bayikewuzi (CHN); W 3–2	Zokirov (UZB); L RSCI	Did not advance	3rd place, bronze medalist(s)
Sarina Naghsh	Women's 65 kg	—N/a	Hasanah (INA); W 3–2	Hwang (PRK); L 0–5	Did not advance		5
Parmida Khoshkhabar	Women's 75 kg	—N/a		Lưu (VIE); L 0–5	Did not advance		5

=== Canoeing ===
Sprint

Athlete	Event	Heat		Semifinal		Final	Rank
Athlete	Event	Time	Rank	Time	Rank	Time	Rank
Mohammad Nabi Rezaei	Men's C1 500 m	Bye				1:51.867	6
Ali Aghamirzaei	Men's K1 500 m	Bye				1:45.190	4
Ali Aghamirzaei; Peiman Ghavidel	Men's K2 500 m	1:33.569	3 QF	Bye		1:32.869	3rd place, bronze medalist(s)
Hiva Afzali	Women's C1 200 m	49.308	4 QS	49.427	1 QF	49.220	7
Hadiyeh Kheiabadi; Maede Shoorgashti	Women's C2 500 m	2:12.441	5 QS	2:06.340	1 FA	2:04.598	7
Elnaz Shafieian	Women's K1 500 m	Bye				2:00.733	5
Elnaz Shafieian; Narjes Kargarpour	Women's K2 500 m	1:52.939	3 QF	Bye		1:54.636	5
Mohammad Nabi Rezaei; Hiva Afzali	Mixed C2 500 m	Bye				1:54.373	4
Peyman Ghavidel; Narjes Kargarpour	Mixed K2 500 m	Bye		1:48.132	1 QF	1:44.415	5

=== Combat sports ===
==== Ju-jitsu ====
Athlete	Event	Round of 32	Round of 16	Quarterfinal	Semifinal	Final / BM	Rank
Pooriya Taherkhani	Men's -94 kg	Rahimi (AFG); W 50–0	Tolendi (KAZ); W 2–0	Arellano (PHI); W 0–0	Park (KOR); L 0–2	Kim (KOR); L 2–5	4
Shahrzad Khoshnoudzadeh	Women's 63 kg	Yoshinaga (JPN); L 2-3	Did not Advance				17
Nasim Mohammadi	Women's 63 kg	Choi (KOR); L 0-2	Did not Advance				17

==== Kurash ====
Athlete	Event	Round of 32	Round of 16	Quarterfinal	Semifinal	Final	Rank
Majid Vahid	Men's 66 kg	Bye	Kamchybekov (KGZ); W 011–001	Najmi (AFG); W 100–000	Aibek Uulu (KGZ); W 001–000	Bobokalonov (TJK); W 010–010	1st place, gold medalist(s)
Ramin Ahmadzadeh	Men's 81 kg	—N/a	Kaunsatan (THA); W 101–000	Çaryýew (TKM); W 101–000	Oyoshi (JPN); W 011–002	Ziyodullaev (UZB); L 001–002	2nd place, silver medalist(s)
Reza Ahmadzadeh	Men's 81 kg	—N/a	Bye	Oyoshi (JPN); L 000–101	Did not advance		5
Tahereh Azarpeivand	Women's 57 kg	Bye	Bharti (IND); W 001–000	Wang (TPE); L 001–010	Did not advance		5
Pardis Eidivandi	Women's 57 kg	Bye	Quelino (PHI); L 001–011	Did not advance			9
Fatemeh Barmaki	Women's +87 kg	—N/a	Bye	Yang (TPE); W 002–000	Shih (TPE); L 001–010	Did not advance	3rd place, bronze medalist(s)
Maryam Peimani	Women's +87 kg	—N/a	Gegeen (MGL); L 001–013	Did not advance			9

==== Mixed martial arts ====
Traditional

Athlete	Event	Preliminary	Quarterfinal	Semi-final	Final	Rank
Athlete	Event	Opposition Result	Opposition Result	Opposition Result	Opposition Result	Rank
Afshin Salimi	Men's 65 kg	Alsamaeea (BHR); W 3-0	Adilov (KAZ); L 0-2	—N/a		5
Arezou Salimi	Women's 60 kg	—N/a	Teo (SGP); L 0-3	—N/a		5

Modern

Athlete	Event	Round of 16	Quarterfinal	Semi-final	Final	Rank
Athlete	Event	Opposition Result	Opposition Result	Opposition Result	Opposition Result	Rank
Amin Ghaedifar	Men's 60 kg	—N/a	Kanybek Uulu (KGZ); L 0-3	—N/a		5

=== Cycling ===
==== Road ====
Athlete	Event	Time	Rank
Arash Mirbagheri	Men's individual time trial	44:09.38	8
Arash Mirbagheri	Men's road race	4:28.56	19
Mandana Dehghan	Women's individual time trial	41:05.39	13
Mandana Dehghan	Women's road race	2:55:24	14

==== Track ====
Athlete	Event	Scratch race		Tempo race		Elimination race		Points race		Total	Rank
Athlete	Event	Rank	Points	Rank	Points	Rank	Points	Rank	Points	Total	Rank
Arash Mirbagheri	Men's omnium	12	18	12	18	12	18	10	2	56	12

=== Equestrian ===
Jumping

Athlete	Horse	Event	Final - Round 1		Final - Round 2	
Athlete	Horse	Event	Score	Rank	Score	Rank
Faezeh Gharavi	Indigo	Individual	106.73	24		

=== Esports ===
Athlete	Event	Preliminary round				Quarterfinal	Semifinal	Final	Rank
Athlete	Event	Round 1	Round 2	Round 3	Rank	Quarterfinal	Semifinal	Final	Rank
Abolfazl Aghaeinasab; Hassan Pajani	eFootball	Saudi Arabia; W 2–0	South Korea; W 1–0	Qatar; W 2–0	1 Q	Saudi Arabia; W 1–0	Japan; W 2–1	Malaysia; W 4–2	1st place, gold medalist(s)

Athlete	Event	Qualification		Semifinal		Final						Rank
Athlete	Event	Result	Rank	Result	Rank	Race 1	Rank	Race 2	Rank	Race 3	Rank	Rank
Amir Hossein Hosseini	Gran Turismo 7	2:14.367	9 Q	21:10.714	6	Did not Advance						9

=== Fencing ===
Sources :

Athlete	Event	Pool round		Round of 32	Round of 16	Quarterfinal	Semifinal	Final	Rank
Athlete	Event	Results	Rank	Round of 32	Round of 16	Quarterfinal	Semifinal	Final	Rank
Ali Pakdaman	Men's individual	Ejaz (PAK) W 5-0; Nguyễn (VIE) W 5-4; Luo (CHN) W 5-1; Villanueva (PHI) W 5-0; Abdulkareem (KUW) L 1-5	1 Q	Bye	Abdazov (UZB); W 15-13	Fotouhi (IRI); W 15-7	Shen (CHN); L 9-15	Did not Advance	3rd place, bronze medalist(s)
Mohammad Fotouhi	Men's individual	Geoffroy (LAO) W 5-1; Alammari (KUW) L 4-5; Ho (HKG) W 5-4; Oh (KOR) W 5-3; Abdazov (UZB) W 5-2	1 Q	Bye	Concepcion (PHI); W 15-7	Pakdaman (IRI); L 7-15	Did not Advance		5
Ali Pakdaman; Mohammad Fotouhi; Nima Zahedi; Taha Kargarpour	Men's team	—N/a			Bye	Japan; L 34–45	Did not advance		5

Athlete	Event	Pool round		Round of 32	Round of 16	Quarterfinal	Semifinal	Final	Rank
Athlete	Event	Results	Rank	Round of 32	Round of 16	Quarterfinal	Semifinal	Final	Rank
Najmeh Sazanjian	Women's individual	Somphao (THA) L 2-5; Dayibekova (UZB) L 3-5; Devi (IND) W 5-4; Jeongmi (KOR) W 5-4; Sarybay (KAZ) L 3-5	5 Q	Gulik (KAZ); W 15-13	Dayibekova (UZB); L 2-15	Did Not Advance			9

=== Football ===
Summary

Key:

- A.E.T – After extra time.
- P – Match decided by penalty-shootout.

Team	Event	Group Stage				Quarterfinals	Semifinals	Final / BM	
Team	Event	Opposition Score	Opposition Score	Opposition Score	Rank	Opposition Score	Opposition Score	Opposition Score	Rank
Iran men's under-23	Men's tournament	United Arab Emirates; W 3–1	China; D 0–0	North Korea; L 1–4	3	Did not Advance			9

=== Golf ===
Athlete	Event	Round 1		Round 2		Round 3		Round 4		Total (To par)	Rank
Athlete	Event	Score	Rank	Score	Rank	Score	Rank	Score	Rank	Total (To par)	Rank
Sajjad Karampour	Men's individual	93	62	72	37	Did not advance				165 (+25)	57
Nazanin Shahraki	Women's individual	85	40	87	40	Did not advance				172 (+32)	40

=== Gymnastics ===
==== Artistic ====
Men – Qualification

Athlete	Event	Floor		Pommel horse		Rings		Vault		Parallel bars		Horizontal bar		Total	
Athlete	Event	Score	Rank	Score	Rank	Score	Rank	Score	Rank	Score	Rank	Score	Rank	Score	Rank
Arman Khodaei	Individual	DNS	—	14.400	4 Q	DNS	—	DNS	—	DNS	—	DNS	—	DNF	—
Siavash Siahi	Individual	DNS	—	DNS	—	13.866	7 Q	DNS	—	DNS	—	DNS	—	DNF	—
Mahdi Ahmadkohani	Individual	DNS	—	DNS	—	13.633	11 Q	DNS	—	DNS	—	DNS	—	DNF	—
Mehdi Olfati	Individual	DNS	—	DNS	—	DNS	—	14.083	3 Q	DNS	—	DNS	—	DNF	—
Mohammad Reza Hamidi	Individual	DNS	—	DNS	—	DNS	—	DNS	—	DNS	—	12.833	12 Q	DNF	—

Men – Finals

Athlete	Event	FX	PH	SR	VT	PB	HB	Total	Rank
Arman Khodaei	Pommel Horse	—N/a	14.566	—N/a					2nd place, silver medalist(s)
Siavash Siahi	Rings	—N/a		13.933	—N/a				5
Mahdi Ahmadkohani	Rings	—N/a		13.033	—N/a				8
Mehdi Olfati	Vault	—N/a			14.533	—N/a			2nd place, silver medalist(s)
Mohammad Reza Hamidi	Horizontal bar	—N/a					12.666	—N/a	6

Women's

Athlete	Event	Vault		Final	
Athlete	Event	Score	Rank	Score	Rank
Hengameh Hadiyani	Women's vault	12.316	13	Did not Advance	

==== Trampoline ====
Athlete	Event	Qualification		Final		Super Final	
Athlete	Event	Score	Rank	Score	Rank	Score	Rank
Aria Mam Abdullah	Men's	57.74	5 Q	57.57	5	Did not Advance	
Mohammad Saeidabadi	Men's	53.86	8 Q	53.76	7	Did not Advance	
Fatemeh Tavassoli	Women's	46.43	6 Q	47.17	5	Did not Advance	
Yalda Hassan Shokati	Women's	41.26	9	Did not Advance			

=== Handball ===
Team	Event	Group stage					Quarterfinal	Semifinal	Final / BM	Rank
Team	Event	Opposition Score	Opposition Score	Opposition Score	Opposition Score	Rank	Opposition Score	Opposition Score	Opposition Score	Rank
Iran men's	Men's tournament	Kuwait; L 24–26	Bahrain; L 20–34	South Korea; D 26–26	Kazakhstan; W 28–23	4 Q	Qatar; L 25–31	Did not Advance		5
Roster: Saber Heidari (18); Milad Ghalandari (4); Mohammadhossein Farokhi (5); Omid Enayati (11); Ali Heidarian (13); Mohammad Siavoshishahenayati (16); Mehran Rahnama (17); Mohammadreza Oraei (23); Mohammadmahdi Behnamnia (24); Roohollah Adelkhani (27); Mohammadreza Kazemi (28); Ali Amiryousefi (66); Omid Robat (69); Alireza Pirzadeh (85); Behshad Fatehizadeh (88); Younes Asari (99); Coach: (Croatia) Nenad Kljaić

=== Judo ===
Athlete	Event	Round of 16	Quarterfinal	Semi-final	Repechage	Final / BM	Rank
Athlete	Event	Opposition Result	Opposition Result	Opposition Result	Opposition Result	Opposition Result	Rank
Abolfazl Mahmoudi	Men's 66 kg	Kim (KOR); L 0-100	Did not Advance				9
Elyas Parhizgar	Men's 81 kg	Elbakiav (UAE); W 100-1	Sherov (TJK); L 1–2s2	Did not Advance	Oyunchimeg (MGL); W 1s2–0s1	J. LEE (KOR); L 0s2–100s1	5
Amir Abbas Choupan	Men's 90 kg	Bayt (CAM); W 100–001	Murtozoev (UZB); L 0–100	Did not Advance	Omarov (UAE); W 110–0	Kim (KOR); L 0–100	4
Mahsa Shakibaei	Women's 52 kg	Qurbonzoda (TJK); L 0-100	Did not Advance				9
Samira Khakkhah	Women's 57 kg	Tao (CHN); L 0-100	Did not Advance				9
Maryam Barbat	Women's 78 kg	Otgonbayar (MGL); W 100-0	Wu (CHN); W 101-0	Sugimura (JPN); L 10–111	—N/a	Toareva (KAZ); L 0–12	4

=== Kabaddi ===
Team	Event	Preliminary round					Semifinal	Final	Rank
Team	Event	Round 1	Round 2	Round 3	Round 4	Rank	Semifinal	Final	Rank
Iran men's	Men	Nepal; W 76–23	Malaysia; W 67–33	Thailand; W 83–27	Pakistan; W 51–30	1 Q	Chinese Taipei; W 59–21	India; L 34–40	2nd place, silver medalist(s)
Iran women's	Women	Japan; W 63–20	Bangladesh; W 54–19	India; L 23–37	—N/a	2 Q	Chinese Taipei; W 23–19	India; L 34–37	2nd place, silver medalist(s)
Roster – Men: Fazel Atrachali; Mohammad Reza Shadloui; Amir Hossein Ejlali; Omid Khojasteh; Ali Samadi; Amir Hossein Bastami; Alireza Mirzaiean; Mohammad Esmaeil Nabibakhsh; Reza Mirbagheri; Amir Mohammad Zafardanesh; Amir Reza Aliakbari; Amir Hossein Taghipour; Coach: Navab Tazeh Ghaleh Roster – Women: Mahtab Lakaliabadi; Zahra Astereki; Saniya Naeimi; Hadiseh Varasteh; Nikta Jalalvand; Zahra Khodabandehloo; Zakiyeh Malmali; Aynaz Faramarzi; Atena Madadi; Zahra Karimi; Fareshte Kolagar; Sahar Yari; Coach:

=== Karate ===
Athlete	Event	Round of 16	Quarterfinal	Semifinal	Final	Rank
Morteza Nemati	Men's 75 kg	Bye	Azhikanov (KAZ); W 8–0	Batican (PHI); W 8–2	Nazmyradow (TKM); W 4–3	1st place, gold medalist(s)
Ali Asghar Asiabari	Men's 84 kg	—N/a	Babikr (QAT); W 4–1	Al-Khatib (PLE); W HAN (0–3)	Al-Jafari (JOR); L 1–9	2nd place, silver medalist(s)
Mahmoud Nemati	Men's +84 kg	—N/a	Xayasan (LAO); W 5–0	Sherpa (NEP); W 5–0	Sufyani (KSA); W 6–3	1st place, gold medalist(s)
Fatemeh Sadeghi	Women's kata	Sakulrattanatara (THA); W 5–0	Lau (HKG); L 0–5	Did not advance	3rd place match Chien (TPE); L 1–4	5
Sepideh Amini; Zeinab Hosseini; Fatemeh Sadeghi	Women's team kata	—N/a	Thailand; W 5–0	Philippines; W 5–0	Vietnam; L 0–5	2nd place, silver medalist(s)
Fatemeh Zahra Saeidabadi	Women's 55 kg	Torvanhxai (LAO); W 8–0	Hafezan (SGP); W 9–1	Sanistyarani (INA); W 8–0	Robert (MAS); L 4–6	2nd place, silver medalist(s)
Atousa Golshadnejad	Women's 68 kg	—N/a	Kama (JPN); L 0–2	Did not advance		7

=== Padel ===
Athlete	Event	Round of 32	Round of 16	Quarterfinal	Semifinal	Final	Rank
Hami Golestan; Aria Roghani	Men's pairs	Bye	Khan and Lo Escoto (HKG); W 2–0 (6–1, 6–0)	Ando and Nakamura (JPN); W 2–0 (6–4, 7–5)	Naif and Naif (QAT); L 0–2 (4–6, 2–6)	3rd place match Shahi and Jamshidi (IRI); L 0–2 (3–6, 4–6)	4
Farsad Shahi; Amir Mohammad Jamshidi	Men's pairs	Bye	Al-Awadhi and Shams (KUW); W 2–0 (6–4, 6–3)	Tomita and Hatakeyama (JPN); W 2–0 (6–1, 7–6)	Chin and Yunus (MAS); L 1–2 (6–1, 4–6, 1–6)	3rd place match Golestan and Roghani (IRI); W 2–0 (6–3, 6–4)	3rd place, bronze medalist(s)
Sahabeh Fard; Zahra Kahrizi	Women's pairs	Al-Mudahka and Al-Abdulrahman (QAT); W 2–0 (6–0, 6–2)	Rezha and Gumulya (INA); L 0–2 (3–6, 1–6)	Did not advance			9
Saba Najafi; Neda Taghipour	Women's pairs	Shahdoor and Al-Hashimi (UAE); W 2–0 (7–6, 6–3)	Lau and Wan (MAS); W 2–1 (3–6, 6–4, 6–1)	Abad and Malazarte (PHI); L 1–2 (2–6, 6–3, 2–6)	Did not advance		5

=== Rowing ===
Athlete	Event	Heat		Final		Rank
Athlete	Event	Time	Rank	Time	Rank	Rank
Bahman Nassiri	Men's single sculls	6:58.70	3 QA	7:18.49	6	6
Amir Hossein Mahmoudpour	Men's lightweight single sculls	7:24.74	1 QA	6:52.59	2	2nd place, silver medalist(s)
Fatemeh Mojallal	Women's single sculls	8:20.29	2 QA	7:35.99	3	3rd place, bronze medalist(s)
Kimia Zareei; Zeinab Norouzi	Women's double sculls	7:31.68	2 QA	6:55.78	2	2nd place, silver medalist(s)
Hengameh Kamyab; Soha Fakhri; Mahsa Javer; Saghi Maleki	Women's quadruple sculls	6:21.68	2 QA	6:27.24	2	2nd place, silver medalist(s)
Hanieh Khorsand; Sara Fakhri	Women's coxless pair	8:05.94	3 QA	7:17.93	4	4
Fatemeh Mojallal	Women's lightweight single sculls	7:27.32	1 QA	7:24.57	1	1st place, gold medalist(s)
Kimia Zareei; Zeinab Norouzi	Women's lightweight double sculls	6:59.10	1 QA	6:53.93	1	1st place, gold medalist(s)

=== Sailing ===
Athlete	Event	Race										Total Points	Net Points	Final Rank
Athlete	Event	1	2	3	4	5	6	7	8	9	MR	Total Points	Net Points	Final Rank
Shahab Khatam	Men's ILCA 7	~~(19)~~	14	14	11	13	14	13	16	15	—N/a	129	110	15

=== Shooting ===
Sources :

Athlete	Event	Qualification		Final	
Athlete	Event	Score	Rank	Score	Rank
Amir Mohammad Nekounam	10 m air rifle	628.9	10	Did not advance	
Amir Mohammad Nekounam	50 m rifle 3 positions	582	14	Did not advance	
Pouria Norouzian	10 m air rifle	626.5	18	Did not advance	
Pouria Norouzian	50 m rifle 3 positions	576	24	Did not advance	
Hadi Gharehbaghi	10 m air rifle	625.3	20	Did not advance	
Hadi Gharehbaghi	50 m rifle 3 positions	569	31	Did not advance	
Javad Foroughi	10 m air pistol	568	34	Did not advance	
Vahid Golkhandan	10 m air pistol	580	10	Did not advance	
Mohammad Rasoul Efati	10 m air pistol	568	37	Did not advance	
Mohammad Beiranvand	Trap	115	14	Did not advance	
Amir Mohammad Nekounam; Pouria Norouzian; Hadi Gharehbaghi	10 m air rifle team			1880.7	5
Amir Mohammad Nekounam; Pouria Norouzian; Hadi Gharehbaghi	50 m rifle 3 positions team			1727	7
Javad Foroughi; Vahid Golkhandan; Mohammad Rasoul Efati	10 m air pistol team			1716	9

Sources :

Athlete	Event	Qualification		Final	
Athlete	Event	Score	Rank	Score	Rank
Shermineh Chehel-Amirani	10 m air rifle	628	17	Did not advance	
Shermineh Chehel-Amirani	50 m rifle 3 positions	583	18	Did not advance	
Najmeh Khedmati	10 m air rifle	626.8	21	Did not advance	
Najmeh Khedmati	50 m rifle 3 positions	587	10	Did not advance	
Fatemeh Amini	10 m air rifle	622.6	34	Did not advance	
Fatemeh Amini	50 m rifle 3 positions	579	30	Did not advance	
Hanieh Rostamian	10 m air pistol	571	18	Did not advance	
Hanieh Rostamian	25 m pistol	587	1 Q	14	7
Zeinab Toumari	10 m air pistol	568	27	Did not advance	
Zeinab Toumari	25 m pistol	554	43	Did not advance	
Samieh Yasi	10 m air pistol	576	6 Q	115.5	8
Samieh Yasi	25 m pistol	563	39	Did not advance	
Marzieh Parvareshnia	Trap	108	13	Did not advance	
Shermineh Chehel-Amirani; Najmeh Khedmati; Fatemeh Amini	10 m air rifle team			1877.4	7
Shermineh Chehel-Amirani; Najmeh Khedmati; Fatemeh Amini	50 m rifle 3 positions team			1749	5
Hanieh Rostamian; Zeinab Toumari; Samieh Yasi	10 m air pistol team			1715	6
Hanieh Rostamian; Zeinab Toumari; Samieh Yasi	25 metre pistol team			1704	8

Sources :

Athlete	Event	Qualification		Final /Bronze medal	
Athlete	Event	Score	Rank	Score	Rank
Shermineh Chehel-Amirani; Amir Mohammad Nekounam	10 m air rifle	DSQ		Did not advance	
Hanieh Rostamian; Vahid Golkhandan	10 m air pistol	584	2 Q	415.8	3rd place, bronze medalist(s)
Marziyeh Paravareshnia; Mohammad Beiranvand	Trap	138	3 Q	12	4

=== Skateboarding ===
Athlete	Event	Preliminary		Final	
Athlete	Event	Score	Rank	Score	Rank
Arian Estehmami	Men's street	15.61	17	Did not advance	

=== Sport climbing ===
Speed

Athlete	Event	Qualification		Quarter-finals		Semi-finals		Final / BM	
Athlete	Event	Best	Rank	Opposition Time	Rank	Opposition Time	Rank	Opposition Time	Rank
Reza Alipour	Men's	5.07	10 Q	5.04	2 Q	Won by False Start	2 Q	5.362	2nd place, silver medalist(s)

Boulder

Athlete	Event	Semi-finals		Final	
Athlete	Event	Score	Rank	Score	Rank
Sarina Ghaffari	Women's	69.2	9	Did not Advance	

=== Squash ===
Individual

Athlete	Event	Round of 64	Round of 32	Round of 16	Quarterfinal	Semifinal	Final	Rank
Sepehr Etemadpour	Men's singles	Bye	Tsukue (JPN); L 0–3 (8–11, 2–11, 9–11)	Did not advance				17
Najmeh Boushehrizadeh	Women's singles	—N/a	Bahadar (PAK); W 3–2 (11–9, 6–11, 10–12, 11–8, 11–6)	Azman (MAS); L 0–3 (2–11, 2–11, 10–12)	Did not advance			9
Fereshteh Eghtedari	Women's singles	—N/a	Ariunbileg (MGL); W 3–0 (11–0, 11–4, 11–1)	Ho (HKG); L 0–3 (6–11, 5–11, 5–11)	Did not advance			9

Team

Athlete	Event	Preliminary round				Repechage	Quarterfinal	Semifinal	Final	Rank
Athlete	Event	Round 1	Round 2	Round 3	Rank	Repechage	Quarterfinal	Semifinal	Final	Rank
Najmeh Boushehrizadeh; Fereshteh Eghtedari; Narges Soltani	Women's team	Japan; L 0–3 (1–3, 1–3, 0–3)	China; L 1–2 (2–3, 3–1, 0–3)	India; L 0–3 (0–3, 0–3, 0–3)	4	Did not advance				10

=== Surfing ===
Surfer	Event	Round 1		Round 2	Round 3	Quarter-finals	Semi-finals	Final	Rank
Surfer	Event	Time	Rank	Opposition Result	Opposition Result	Opposition Result	Opposition Result	Opposition Result	Rank
Davoud Khadir	Men's shortboard	2.56	3 Q	Babu (IND); L 3.60–8.96	Did not Advance				17

=== Table tennis ===
Sources :

Athlete	Event	Round of 64	Round of 32	Round of 16	Quarterfinal	Semifinal	Final / BM	
Athlete	Event	Opposition Result	Opposition Result	Opposition Result	Opposition Result	Opposition Result	Opposition Result	Rank
Noshad Alamian	Men's singles	Ahmed (MDV); W 4-0	Pang (SGP); W 4–0	Wong (HKG); W 4–2	Harimoto (JPN); W 4–3	Chuqin (CHN); L 1–4	Did not Advance	3rd place, bronze medalist(s)
Benyamin Faraji	Men's singles	Kulappuwawadu (SRI); W 4-0	Shah (IND); L 0–4	Did not Advance				17
Noshad Alamian; Nima Alamian	Men's doubles	Khan / Khan (PAK); W 3–0	Zhubanov / Kenzhigulov (KAZ); W 3–2	Chan / Wong (HKG); W 3–1	Wen / Peng (CHN); L 0–3	Did not Advance		5
Benyamin Faraji; Arian Ghaffari	Men's doubles	Ismail / Ahmed (MDV); W 3–2	Gerassimenko / Kurmangaliyev (KAZ); L 1–3	Did not Advance				17
Mahshid Ashtari	Women's singles	Rasmi (INA); L 1–4	Did not Advance					33
Setayesh Iloukhani	Women's singles	Nebuchadnezzar (INA); W 4–3	Hayata (JPN); L 0–4	Did not Advance				17
Mahshid Ashtari; Setayesh Iloukhani	Women's doubles	Bye	Chitale / Ghorpade (IND); L 0-3	Did not Advance				17
Arian Ghaffari; Mahshid Ashtari	Mixed doubles	Sanguansin / Paranang (THA); L 1—3	Did not Advance					33
Benyamin Faraji; Setayesh Iloukhani	Mixed doubles	Pratama / Marcella (INA); L 2–3	Did not Advance					33

Sources :

Athlete	Event	Group stage				Round of 16	Quarterfinal	Semifinal	Final	
Athlete	Event	Opposition Score	Opposition Score	Opposition Score	Rank	Opposition Score	Opposition Score	Opposition Score	Opposition Score	Rank
Nima Alamian; Noshad Alamian; Benyamin Faraji; Arian Ghaffari; Mohammad Hassan Habibi	Men's team	Pakistan; W 3–0	India; W 3–0	Indonesia; W 3–1	1Q	Singapore; W 3–0	Chinese Taipei; L 0–3	Did not advance		5

=== Taekwondo ===
Poomsae

Athlete	Event	Semifinal		Final	Rank
Athlete	Event	Score	Rank	Score	Rank
Morteza Zendehdel	Men's individual	8.75	5	Did not advance	9
Yasaman Limouchi	Women's individual	8.25	2 Q	8.85	5

Kyorugi

Athlete	Event	Round of 16	Quarterfinal	Semifinal	Final	Rank
Abolfazl Zandi	Men's 58 kg	Shuhratzod (TJK); W 2–0 (16–1, 15–0)	Tleules (KAZ); L 0–2 (2–11, 11–16)	Did not advance		5
Mehdi Haji Mousaei	Men's 68 kg	Bye	Chen (CHN); W 2–1 (13–5, 5–7, 24–17)	Kareem (JOR); W 2–1 (8–5, 4–6, 16–5)	Tubtimdang (THA); L 0–2 (5–6, 2–3)	2nd place, silver medalist(s)
Amir Sina Bakhtiari	Men's 80 kg	Xiang (CHN); L 0–2 (4–5, 0–2)	Did not advance			9
Arian Salimi	Men's +80 kg	Bye	Tang (CHN); W 2–0 (19–10, 14–4)	Al-Adarbi (JOR); W 2–0 (15–2, 13–2)	Mavlonov (UZB); W 2–0 (26–4, 20–8)	1st place, gold medalist(s)
Sayna Karimi	Women's 49 kg	Lam (HKG); W 2–0 (13–2, 13–0)	Okamoto (JPN); L Ret (14–6, 3–10, 6–15)	Did not advance		5
Nahid Kiani	Women's 57 kg	Kaznabek (KAZ); W 2–0 (6–4, 8–3)	Lin (TPE); L 1–2 (5–12, 9–9, 2–6)	Did not advance		5
Saghar Moradi	Women's 67 Kg	Bye	Sulaimanova (KGZ); W 2–0 (9–1, 13–1)	Wang (TPE); W 2–0 (14–3, 7–5)	Sobirjonova (UZB); W 2–0 (8–8, 16–11)	1st place, gold medalist(s)
Fatemeh Ahmadi	Women's +67 Kg	Lin (TPE); W 2–0 (2–0, 0–0)	Saber (KSA); W 2–1 (3–0, 1–1, 5–0)	Song (KOR); L 0–2 (1–7, 0–2)	Did not advance	3rd place, bronze medalist(s)
Amir Sina Bakhtiari	Open individual virtual	Jaysunov (UZB); W 2–0 (560–460, 260–20)	Yap (SGP); L 0–2 (0–80, 20–580)	Did not advance		5

=== Tennis ===
Athlete	Event	Round of 64	Round of 32	Round of 16	Quarterfinal	Semifinal	Final	Rank
Kasra Rahmani	Men's singles	Bye	Skatov (KAZ); L 1–2 (6–2, 3–6, 3–6)	Did not advance				17
Ali Yazdani	Men's singles	Bye	Wu (CHN); L 0–2 (1–6, 1–6)	Did not advance				17
Kasra Rahmani; Ali Yazdani	Men's doubles	—N/a	Jiang and Zhang (CHN); L 0–2 (4–6, 4–6)	Did not advance				17
Mandegar Farzami	Women's singles	—N/a	Yuldasheva (UZB); W 2–0 (7–5, 6–3)	Garland (TPE); L 0–2 (1–6, 1–6)	Did not advance			9
Meshkatolzahra Safi	Women's singles	—N/a	Asimova (TJK); W 2–0 (6–0, 6–1)	Zhang (CHN); L 0–2 (1–6, 0–6)	Did not advance			9
Mandegar Farzami; Meshkatolzahra Safi	Women's doubles	—N/a	Khongorzul and Yesügen (MGL); W 2–0 (6–1, 6–0)	Kobori and Shimizu (JPN); L 0–2 (0–6, 0–6)	Did not advance			9
Kasra Rahmani; Meshkatolzahra Safi	Mixed doubles	—N/a	Alcantara and Rivera (PHI); L 1–2 (4–6, 6–1, 0–1)	Did not advance				17
Ali Yazdani; Mandegar Farzami	Mixed doubles	—N/a	Tseng and Hsieh (TPE); L 0–2 (1–6, 2–6)	Did not advance				17

=== Triathlon ===
Athlete	Event	Time						Rank
Athlete	Event	Swim (0.75 km)	Trans 1	Bike (20 km)	Trans 2	Run (5 km)	Total	Rank
Farid Hadipour	Men's individual	9:45	0:39	29:22	0:21	17:15	57:22	21

=== Volleyball ===
==== Beach ====
Athletes	Event	Group stage				Round of 16	Quarterfinal	Semifinal	Final / BM	
Athletes	Event	Opposition Score	Opposition Score	Opposition Score	Rank	Opposition Score	Opposition Score	Opposition Score	Opposition Score	Rank
Abbas Pourasgari; Alireza Aghajani	Men	Xavier / Valente (TLS); W 2–0 (21–12, 21–4)	Al-Huosni / Al-Mamari (OMA); W 2–0 (21-12, 21-13)	Muneekul / Muadpha (THA); W 2–0 (27-25, 24-22)	1 Q	Tachiya / Ishijima (JPN); W 2-1 (18-21, 21-17, 15-8)	Samba / Janko (QAT); L 0-2 (13-21, 20-22)	Did not Advance		5
Amir Ali Ghalehnovi; Abolhassan Khakizadeh	Men	Adam / Ismail (MDV); W 2–0 (21–12, 21–14)	Shaikat / Ahmed (BAN); W 2–0 (21–13, 21–12)	Kurosawa / Mizumachi (JPN); L 1–2 (21-17, 19-21, 15-12)	2 Q	Bogatu / Gurin (KAZ); L 1-2 (15-21, 21-18, 11-15)	Did not Advance			9

==== Indoor ====
Team	Event	Group stage				Quarterfinal / 9th-14th classification	Semifinal / 9th-12th classification	Final / BM	
Team	Event	Opposition Score	Opposition Score	Opposition Score	Rank	Opposition Score	Opposition Score	Opposition Score	Rank
Iran men's	Men's tournament	Kyrgyzstan; W 3–0	Thailand; W 3–0	Indonesia; W 3–2	1 Q	South Korea; W 3–2	Pakistan; W 3–0	Japan; W 3–1	1st place, gold medalist(s)

Team roster

- Arshia Behnezhad
- Ilshan Davoodipour
- Amin Esmaeilnezhad
- Morteza Sharifi
- Pouria Hossein Khanzadeh
- Ali Haghparast
- Mobin Nasri
- Mohammad Valizadeh
- Yousef Kazemi
- Seyed Eisa Naseri
- Hossein Haji Kalateh
- Ali Hajipour

Group play

Pos	Team	Pld	W	L	Pts	SW	SL	SR	SPW	SPL	SPR	Qualification
1	Iran	3	3	0	8	9	2	4.500	260	203	1.281	Quarterfinals
2	Thailand	3	2	1	5	6	5	1.200	244	246	0.992	Quarterfinals
3	Indonesia	3	1	2	5	7	6	1.167	301	289	1.042	Classification 9th–16th
4	Kyrgyzstan	3	0	3	0	0	9	0.000	160	227	0.705	Classification 9th–16th

Source: asiangames2026.org
Rules for classification: Tiebreakers

=== Weightlifting ===
Athlete	Event	Snatch		Clean & Jerk		Total	
Athlete	Event	Result	Rank	Result	Rank	Result	Rank
Mirmostafa Javadi	Men's 85 kg	158	4	200	5	358	5
Ali Alipour	Men's 95 kg	180 AR	1	218 GR	1	398 WR	1st place, gold medalist(s)
Alireza Nassiri	Men's 110 kg	180	5	223	2	403	4
Ali Davoudi	Men's +110 kg	206	2	260 GR	1	466 AR	1st place, gold medalist(s)
Reihaneh Karimi	Women's 77 kg	107	4	136	3	243	3rd place, bronze medalist(s)
Mahsa Beheshti	Women's 86 kg	113	4	146	3	259	3rd place, bronze medalist(s)

=== Wrestling ===
Freestyle

Athlete	Event	Round of 32	Round of 16	Quarterfinal	Semifinal	Final	Rank
Ali Momeni	Men's 57 kg	Bye	Belolyubskii (TJK); L 1–4	Did not advance			15
Abbas Ebrahimzadeh	Men's 65 kg	Bye	Fernando (SRI); W 11–0	Kalkal (IND); L 0–10	Repechage; Zazai (AFG); W 15–5	3rd place match Kiyooka (JPN); L 2–3	5
Younes Emami	Men's 74 kg	—N/a	Zhamalov (UZB); W 7–6	Jaglan (IND); W 10–0	Kaipanov (KAZ); W 4–2	Aoyagi (JPN); W 9–5	1st place, gold medalist(s)
Mohammad Nokhodi	Men's 86 kg	—N/a	Aburiala (PLE); W 11–0	Lee (KOR); W 11–1	Shavaev (KGZ); W 3–0	Ishiguro (JPN); W 9–6	1st place, gold medalist(s)
Amir Ali Azarpira	Men's 97 kg	—N/a	Gulzar (PAK); W 10–0	Hemelýäýew (TKM); W 10–0	Yoshida (JPN); W 4–3	Poyonov (UZB); W 10–0	1st place, gold medalist(s)
Amir Hossein Zare	Men's 125 kg	—N/a	Yamamoto (JPN); W 10–0	Saparow (TKM); W 11–0	Kassimbek (KAZ); W 3–3	Buheeerdun (CHN); W 12–2	1st place, gold medalist(s)

Greco-Roman

Athlete	Event	Round of 16	Quarterfinal	Semifinal	Final	Rank
Sajjad Abbaspour	Men's 60 kg	Tan (CHN); W 5–3	Dalal (IND); W 1–1	Ganiev (UZB); L 4–8	3rd place match Suzuki (JPN); L 4–7	5
Mohammad Javad Rezaei	Men's 67 kg	Shermakhanbet (KAZ); L 5–14	Did not advance			11
Alireza Abdevali	Men's 77 kg	Bye	Sulaeman (INA); W 8–0	Badaghi (QAT); W 9–0	Kusaka (JPN); W 5–3	1st place, gold medalist(s)
Gholamreza Farrokhi	Men's 87 kg	Ozhaev (KAZ); L 6–6	Did not advance			8
Mehdi Bali	Men's 97 kg	Fallatah (KSA); W 7–0	Dzhuzupbekov (KGZ); W 10–0	Nakazato (JPN); L 4–5	3rd place match Yevloyev (KAZ); W Fall (5–1)	3rd place, bronze medalist(s)
Amin Mirzazadeh	Men's 130 kg	Bye	Botoev (KGZ); W 7–0	Meng (CHN); W 1–1	Tsitsuashvili (UZB); W 3–1	1st place, gold medalist(s)

=== Wushu ===
Taolu

Athlete	Event	Round 1			Round 2			Total	Rank
Athlete	Event	Form	Score	Rank	Form	Score	Rank	Total	Rank
Abolfazl Gharehbaghi	Men's changquan	—N/a						9.593	13
Shahin Banitalebi	Men's nanquan & nangun	Nanquan	9.736	2	Nangun	9.616	14	19.352	9
Hossein Gheblehnama	Men's daoshu & gunshu	Daoshu	9.690	5	Gunshu	9.696	5	19.386	4
Zahra Kiani	Women's changquan	—N/a						9.703	4
Helia Asadian	Women's nanquan & nandao	Nanquan	9.690	6	Nandao	9.696	4	19.386	4
Mina Panahi	Women's nanquan & nandao	Nanquan	9.716	3	Nandao	9.253	9	18.969	8

Sanda

Athlete	Event	Round of 32	Round of 16	Quarterfinal	Semifinal	Final	Rank
Mehdi Kermani	Men's 60 kg	—N/a	Odilov (UZB); W 2–0	Leung (HKG); L 0–2	Did not advance		5
Shoja Panahi	Men's 65 kg	Bye	Öwezgeldiýew (TKM); W 2–0	Makhamadjonov (UZB); W 2–0	Nguyễn (VIE); W 2–0	Wang (CHN); L 0–2	2nd place, silver medalist(s)
Erfan Moharrami	Men's 70 kg	—N/a	Cheung (HKG); W 2–0	Jang (KOR); W 2–0	Ablagatov (KAZ); W PD	Ma (CHN); L 0–2	2nd place, silver medalist(s)
Soheil Mousavi	Men's 75 kg	—N/a	Baliyan (IND); W 2–0	Song (KOR); W 2–1	Turgunbaev (UZB); W PD	Abdullayev (KAZ); W PD	1st place, gold medalist(s)
Sogand Sinkaei	Women's 52 kg	—N/a	Dahiya (IND); W 2–0	Ngô (VIE); W 2–0	Chan (HKG); W 2–0	Wu (CHN); L 0–2	2nd place, silver medalist(s)
Diana Rahimi	Women's 60 kg	—N/a	Zhang (CHN); L 0–2	Did not advance			9
