= Kurash at the Asian Games =

- Governing bodies: IKA (World) / KCAO (Asia)
- Events: 6 (men: 3; women: 3)

Games
- 1951; 1954; 1958; 1962; 1966; 1970; 1974; 1978; 1982; 1986; 1990; 1994; 1998; 2002; 2006; 2010; 2014; 2018; 2022; 2026
- Medalists

Kurash has been included in the Asian Games since the 2018 Asian Games in Indonesia.

== Editions ==
Games	Year	Host city	Best nation
XVIII	2018	Jakarta–Palembang, Indonesia	Uzbekistan
XIX	2022	Hangzhou, China	Uzbekistan
XX	2026	Aichi–Nagoya, Japan	Uzbekistan

== Events ==
Event	18	22	26	Years
Men's 66 kg	X	X	X	3
Men's 81 kg	X	X	X	3
Men's 90 kg	X	X		2
Men's +90 kg	X	X	X	3
Women's 52 kg	X	X		2
Women's 57 kg			X	1
Women's 63 kg	X			1
Women's 70 kg		X		1
Women's 78 kg	X		X	2
Women's 87 kg		X		1
Women's +87 kg			X	1
Total	7	7	6	

== Medal table ==
Rank	Nation	Gold	Silver	Bronze	Total
1	Uzbekistan (UZB)	13	3	7	23
2	Iran (IRI)	3	5	4	12
3	China (CHN)	2	0	0	2
4	South Korea (KOR)	1	2	2	5
5	Tajikistan (TJK)	0	3	3	6
6	Chinese Taipei (TPE)	0	2	4	6
7	Mongolia (MGL)	0	2	1	3
8	Kazakhstan (KAZ)	0	1	3	4
9	India (IND)	0	1	2	3
10	Thailand (THA)	0	0	3	3
11	Afghanistan (AFG)	0	0	2	2
11	Japan (JPN)	0	0	2	2
11	Turkmenistan (TKM)	0	0	2	2
11	Vietnam (VIE)	0	0	2	2
15	Indonesia (INA)	0	0	1	1
15	Kuwait (KUW)	0	0	1	1
15	Kyrgyzstan (KGZ)	0	0	1	1
Totals (17 entries)		19	19	40	78

== Participating nations ==
Nation	18	22	26	Years
Afghanistan	10	3	3	3
Bahrain			1	1
China		2		1
Chinese Taipei	11	6	7	3
India	14	6	6	3
Indonesia	14	1		2
Iran	12	6	7	3
Iraq	2	2		2
Japan	2	2	5	3
Kazakhstan	12	6	7	3
Kuwait	3	3		2
Kyrgyzstan	4	6	6	3
Lebanon	3	3		2
Mongolia	14	6	4	3
Nepal	2			1
Pakistan	4			1
Palestine	1			1
Philippines	8	4	6	3
Saudi Arabia		1		1
Singapore			1	1
South Korea	2	7	7	3
Syria	2		1	2
Tajikistan	7	3	4	3
Thailand	5	5	4	3
Turkmenistan	14	6	6	3
Uzbekistan	14	7	7	3
Vietnam	9	6	4	3
Yemen	4			1
Number of nations	24	21	18	
Number of athletes	173	91	86	
