= Kurash at the 2026 Asian Games =

- Venue: Aichi Budokan
- Dates: 27–29 September 2026
- Competitors: 86 from 18 nations

Kurash at the 2026 Asian Games was held between 27 and 29 September 2026 at the Aichi Budokan, Nagoya, Japan. Each country was limited to having 3 men and 4 women.

== Schedule ==
P	Preliminary rounds	F	Semifinals & Final

Event↓/Date →	27th Sun		28th Mon		29th Tue	
Men's 66 kg					P	F
Men's 81 kg			P	F		
Men's +90 kg	P	F				
Women's 57 kg	P	F				
Women's 78 kg			P	F		
Women's +87 kg					P	F

== Medalists ==
=== Men ===
Event	Gold	Silver	Bronze
66 kg	Majid Vahid; Iran	Yosin Bobokalonov; Tajikistan	Kubanychbek Aibek Uulu; Kyrgyzstan
66 kg	Majid Vahid; Iran	Yosin Bobokalonov; Tajikistan	Sarvar Abdushukurov; Tajikistan
81 kg	Akhror Ziyodullaev; Uzbekistan	Ramin Ahmadzadeh; Iran	Adilet Akhmetgali; Kazakhstan
81 kg	Akhror Ziyodullaev; Uzbekistan	Ramin Ahmadzadeh; Iran	Ken Oyoshi; Japan
+90 kg	Shokhrukhkhon Bakhtiyorov; Uzbekistan	Shakarmamad Mirmamadov; Tajikistan	Bekmurod Oltiboev; Uzbekistan
+90 kg	Shokhrukhkhon Bakhtiyorov; Uzbekistan	Shakarmamad Mirmamadov; Tajikistan	Kunathip Yea-on; Thailand

=== Women ===
Event	Gold	Silver	Bronze
57 kg	Ibodatkhon Agojonova; Uzbekistan	Lee Wan-ting; Chinese Taipei	Wang Pin-chun; Chinese Taipei
57 kg	Ibodatkhon Agojonova; Uzbekistan	Lee Wan-ting; Chinese Taipei	Natsumi Kuroki; Japan
78 kg	Pokizakhon Kamoldinova; Uzbekistan	Mo Su-min; South Korea	Shokhista Nazarova; Uzbekistan
78 kg	Pokizakhon Kamoldinova; Uzbekistan	Mo Su-min; South Korea	Pincky Balhara; India
+87 kg	Kim Min-young; South Korea	Shih Liu Li-ling; Chinese Taipei	Fatemeh Barmaki; Iran
+87 kg	Kim Min-young; South Korea	Shih Liu Li-ling; Chinese Taipei	Arailym Shegenova; Kazakhstan

== Medal table ==
Rank	Nation	Gold	Silver	Bronze	Total
1	Uzbekistan (UZB)	4	0	2	6
2	Iran (IRI)	1	1	1	3
3	South Korea (KOR)	1	1	0	2
4	Chinese Taipei (TPE)	0	2	1	3
4	Tajikistan (TJK)	0	2	1	3
6	Japan (JPN)	0	0	2	2
6	Kazakhstan (KAZ)	0	0	2	2
8	India (IND)	0	0	1	1
8	Kyrgyzstan (KGZ)	0	0	1	1
8	Thailand (THA)	0	0	1	1
Totals (10 entries)		6	6	12	24

== Participating nations ==
A total of 86 athletes from 18 nations competed in kurash at the 2026 Asian Games:

- Afghanistan (3)
- Bahrain (1)
- Chinese Taipei (7)
- India (6)
- Iran (7)
- Japan (5)
- Kazakhstan (7)
- Kyrgyzstan (6)
- Mongolia (4)
- Philippines (6)
- Singapore (1)
- South Korea (7)
- Syria (1)
- Tajikistan (4)
- Thailand (4)
- Turkmenistan (6)
- Uzbekistan (7)
- Vietnam (4)
