= Kunathip Yea-on =

Thai judoka

Personal information
- Nationality: Thai
- Born: 18 August 1995 (age 31)

Sport
- Sport: Judo
Medal record
Men's kurash
Representing Thailand
Asian Games
Bronze medal – third place	2022 Hangzhou	+90 kg
Bronze medal – third place	2026 Aichi-Nagoya	+90 kg

Kunathip Yea-on (Thai: คุณาธิป เยี่ยอ้น; born 18 August 1995) is a Thai judoka.

He competed at the 2016 Summer Olympics in Rio de Janeiro, in the men's +100 kg.
