= Wushu at the 2022 Asian Games – Men's sanda 65 kg =

Men's sanda 65 kg at the 2022 Asian Games
- Venue: Xiaoshan Guali Sports Centre
- Dates: 25–28 September 2023
- Competitors: 15 from 15 nations

Medalists
gold medal	Afshin Salimi	Iran
silver medal	Samuel Marbun	Indonesia
bronze medal	Jeon Seong-jin	South Korea
bronze medal	Clemente Tabugara	Philippines

The men's sanda 65 kilograms competition at the 2022 Asian Games in Hangzhou, China was held from 25 to 28 September 2023 at the Xiaoshan Guali Sports Centre.

A total of fifteen competitors from fifteen countries (NOCs) competed in this event, limited to fighters whose body weight was less than 75 kilograms.

Competition bouts consist of 3 rounds in total, each lasting two minutes with a one-minute rest period between rounds. The athlete who scores more points in each round is the winner of that rounds; the bout ends when one athlete has won two rounds (and thus the match).

== Schedule ==
All times are China Standard Time (UTC+08:00)

Date	Time	Event
Monday, 25 September 2023	19:30	1/8 finals
Tuesday, 26 September 2023	19:30	Quarterfinals
Wednesday, 27 September 2023	19:30	Semifinals
Thursday, 28 September 2023	09:30	Final

== Results ==
Legend

- KO — Won by knockout
- PD — Won by point difference

1/8 finals
Nipun Shanika (SRI)
Trương Văn Chương (VIE)	PD
Jeon Seong-jin (KOR)	2
Majid Rasoli (AFG)	0
Saman Ghushry (NEP)	0
Chanachai Kamolklang (THA)	2
Maksat Handurdyýew (TKM)	1
Clemente Tabugara (PHI)	2
Muhammad Abdul Rehman (PAK)
Abdusamat Ashirov (KAZ)	KO
Vikrant Baliyan (IND)	1
Samuel Marbun (INA)	2
Donechanh Phetmala (LAO)
Bakytbek Koldosh Uulu (KGZ)	PD

Quarterfinals
Afshin Salimi (IRI)	2
Trương Văn Chương (VIE)	0
Jeon Seong-jin (KOR)	KO
Chanachai Kamolklang (THA)
Clemente Tabugara (PHI)	2
Abdusamat Ashirov (KAZ)	0
Samuel Marbun (INA)	PD
Bakytbek Koldosh Uulu (KGZ)

Semifinals
Afshin Salimi (IRI)	2
Jeon Seong-jin (KOR)	0
Clemente Tabugara (PHI)	0
Samuel Marbun (INA)	2

Final
Afshin Salimi (IRI)	PD
Samuel Marbun (INA)
