= Wushu at the 2026 Asian Games – Men's sanda 65 kg =

Men's sanda 65 kg at the 2026 Asian Games
- Venue: Aichi Budokan
- Dates: 20–24 September 2026
- Competitors: 17 from 17 nations

Medalists
gold medal	Wang Chengjin	China
silver medal	Shoja Panahi	Iran
bronze medal	Nguyễn Khắc Kiên	Vietnam
bronze medal	Hamid Ashrafi	Afghanistan

The men's sanda 65 kilograms competition at the 2026 Asian Games in Nagoya, Japan was held from 20 to 24 September 2026 at the Aichi Prefectural Martial Arts Hall.

Competition bouts consist of 3 rounds in total, each lasting two minutes with a one-minute rest period between rounds. The athlete who scores more points in each round is the winner of that rounds; the bout ends when one athlete has won two rounds (and thus the match).

== Schedule ==
All times are Japan Standard Time (UTC+09:00)

Date	Time	Event
Sunday, 20 September 2026	18:00	1/16 finals
Monday, 21 September 2026	18:00	1/8 finals
Tuesday, 22 September 2026	18:00	Quarterfinals
Wednesday, 23 September 2026	18:00	Semifinals
Thursday, 24 September 2026	09:30	Final

== Results ==
Legend

- PD — Won by point difference

=== Final ===
Final
Shoja Panahi (IRI)	0
Wang Chengjin (CHN)	2

=== Top half ===
1/16 finals
Avazbek Makhamadjonov (UZB)	2
Üürtsaikhyn Javkhlan (MGL)	0

1/8 finals
Jung Da-jae (KOR)	0
Avazbek Makhamadjonov (UZB)	2
Shoja Panahi (IRI)	2
Hezret Öwezgeldiýew (TKM)	0
Bakhtiyor Shafoatov (TJK)	0
Xander Alipio (PHI)	2
Oudomdeth Hongpaseuth (LAO)
Nguyễn Khắc Kiên (VIE)	PD

Quarterfinals
Avazbek Makhamadjonov (UZB)	0
Shoja Panahi (IRI)	2
Xander Alipio (PHI)	0
Nguyễn Khắc Kiên (VIE)	2

Semifinals
Shoja Panahi (IRI)	2
Nguyễn Khắc Kiên (VIE)	0

=== Bottom half ===
1/16 finals

1/8 finals
Hamid Ashrafi (AFG)	2
Guo Tun Hung (MAC)	0
Beksultan Koskenov (KAZ)	0
Samuel Marbun (INA)	2
Marsel Zhenishbek Uulu (KGZ)	PD
Chainarong Yawanophat (THA)
Wang Chengjin (CHN)	PD
Amar Sunar (NEP)

Quarterfinals
Hamid Ashrafi (AFG)	2
Samuel Marbun (INA)	0
Marsel Zhenishbek Uulu (KGZ)
Wang Chengjin (CHN)	PD

Semifinals
Hamid Ashrafi (AFG)
Wang Chengjin (CHN)	PD
