= Wushu at the 2026 Asian Games – Men's sanda 75 kg =

Men's sanda 75 kg at the 2026 Asian Games
- Venue: Aichi Budokan
- Dates: 20–24 September 2026
- Competitors: 14 from 14 nations

Medalists
| gold medal | Soheil Mousavi | Iran |
| silver medal | Abdurashid Abdullayev | Kazakhstan |
| bronze medal | Doniyor Turgunbaev | Uzbekistan |
| bronze medal | Zhang Huan-yi | Chinese Taipei |

The men's sanda 75 kilograms competition at the 2026 Asian Games in Nagoya, Japan was held from 20 to 24 September 2026 at the Aichi Prefectural Martial Arts Hall.

A total of fourteen competitors from fourteen countries (NOCs) competed in this event, limited to fighters whose body weight was less than 75 kilograms.

Competition bouts consist of 3 rounds in total, each lasting two minutes with a one-minute rest period between rounds. The athlete who scores more points in each round is the winner of that rounds; the bout ends when one athlete has won two rounds (and thus the match).

Soheil Mousavi from Iran won the gold medal.

== Schedule ==
All times are Japan Standard Time (UTC+09:00)

| Date | Time | Event |
|---|---|---|
| Sunday, 20 September 2026 | 18:00 | 1/8 finals |
| Tuesday, 22 September 2026 | 18:00 | Quarterfinals |
| Wednesday, 23 September 2026 | 18:00 | Semifinals |
| Thursday, 24 September 2026 | 09:30 | Final |

== Results ==
Legend

- KO — Won by knockout
- PD — Won by point difference

1/8 finals
Soheil Mousavi (IRI) | 2
Vikrant Baliyan (IND) | 0
Narantsetsegiin Tsatsral (MGL)
Doniyor Turgunbaev (UZB) | PD
Mohammad Jafar Sultani (AFG) | 0
Temirlan Amankulov (KGZ) | 2
Zhang Huan-yi (TPE) | 2
Muhammet Jumamyradow (TKM) | 0
Zaib Hasnain (PAK) | 0
Mirzodalerkhon Khurshedzoda (TJK) | 2
Anong Teunchaleun (LAO) | 0
Abdurashid Abdullayev (KAZ) | 2

Quarterfinals
Song Gi-cheol (KOR) | 1
Soheil Mousavi (IRI) | 2
Doniyor Turgunbaev (UZB) | 2
Temirlan Amankulov (KGZ) | 0
Zhang Huan-yi (TPE) | 2
Mirzodalerkhon Khurshedzoda (TJK) | 0
Abdurashid Abdullayev (KAZ) | KO
Sanjeev Maharjan (NEP)

Semifinals
Soheil Mousavi (IRI) | PD
Doniyor Turgunbaev (UZB)
Zhang Huan-yi (TPE)
Abdurashid Abdullayev (KAZ) | KO

Final
Soheil Mousavi (IRI) | PD
Abdurashid Abdullayev (KAZ)
