= Boxing at the 2026 Asian Games – Men's 90 kg =

Boxing competitions

Men's 90 kg at the 2026 Asian Games
- Venue: Nishio City Gymnasium
- Date: 26 September – 2 October 2026
- Competitors: 13 from 13 nations

Medalists
gold medal	Turabek Khabibullaev	Uzbekistan
silver medal	Han Xuezhen	China
bronze medal	Kapil Pokhariya	India
bronze medal	Parviz Karimov	Tajikistan

The men's 90 kilograms event at the 2026 Asian Games took place from 26 September to 2 October 2026 at the Nishio City Gymnasium, Nishio, Aichi Prefecture, Japan.

The gold medal was won by Uzbekistan's Turabek Khabibullaev, who defeated China's Han Xuezhen by a 5–0 unanimous decision in the final. Kapil Pokhariya of India and Parviz Karimov of Tajikistan took the bronze medals.

== Schedule ==
All times are Japan Standard Time (UTC+09:00)

Date	Time	Event
Saturday, 26 September 2026	14:00	Round of 16
Monday, 28 September 2026	19:00	Quarterfinals
Wednesday, 30 September 2026	15:30	Semifinals
Friday, 2 October 2026	14:15	Final

== Results ==
Legend

- KO — Won by knockout

Round of 16
Silab Noori (AFG)	0
Nurbek Oralbay (KAZ)	5
Kapil Pokhariya (IND)	5
Sam Esteki (IRI)	0
Kim Gi-chae (KOR)	KO
Irfan Khan (PAK)
Jakkapong Yomkhot (THA)	5
Rabin Nepal (NEP)	0
Bakyt Toktosun Uulu (KGZ)	2
Jorge Luis Felimón (BRN)	3

Quarterfinals
Turabek Khabibullaev (UZB)	3
Nurbek Oralbay (KAZ)	2
Kapil Pokhariya (IND)	5
Kim Gi-chae (KOR)	0
Han Xuezhen (CHN)	5
Jakkapong Yomkhot (THA)	0
Jorge Luis Felimón (BRN)	0
Parviz Karimov (TJK)	5

Semifinals
Turabek Khabibullaev (UZB)	4
Kapil Pokhariya (IND)	1
Han Xuezhen (CHN)	4
Parviz Karimov (TJK)	0

Final
Turabek Khabibullaev (UZB)	5
Han Xuezhen (CHN)	0
