= Afghanistan at the 2026 Asian Games =

- Flag of Afghanistan (Note: Afghanistan competes under the tricolor flag used by the Islamic Republic and not the white banner preferred by the Taliban.)
- IOC code: AFG
- NOC: National Olympic Committee of the Islamic Republic of Afghanistan

in Aichi–Nagoya, Japan 19 September – 4 October 2026
- Competitors: 50 in 15 sports
- Medals Ranked 32nd: Gold 0 Silver 1 Bronze 2 Total 3

Asian Games appearances (overview)
- 1951; 1954; 1958; 1962; 1966; 1970; 1974; 1978; 1982; 1986; 1990; 1994; 1998; 2002; 2006; 2010; 2014; 2018; 2022; 2026

Afghanistan competed at the 2026 Asian Games in Aichi Prefecture and Nagoya, Japan from 19 September to 4 October 2026.

== Medal summary ==
=== Medalists ===
The following Afghanistan competitors won medals at the Games.

Medal	Name	Sport	Event	Date
Silver	Fariba Hashimi	Cycling	Women's road race	22 Sep
Bronze	Hamid Ashrafi	Wushu	Men's sanda 65 kg	23 Sep
Bronze	Khalid Hotak	Wushu	Men's sanda 70 kg	23 Sep

=== Medals by sports ===
Sport	1st place, gold medalist(s)	2nd place, silver medalist(s)	3rd place, bronze medalist(s)	Total
Cycling	0	1	0	1
Wushu	0	0	2	2
Total	0	1	2	3

Medals by day
Day	Date	1st place, gold medalist(s)	2nd place, silver medalist(s)	3rd place, bronze medalist(s)	Total
1	20 September	0	0	0	0
2	21 September	0	0	0	0
3	22 September	0	1	0	1
4	23 September	0	0	2	2
5	24 September	0	0	0	0
6	25 September	0	0	0	0
7	26 September	0	0	0	0
8	27 September	0	0	0	0
9	28 September	0	0	0	0
10	29 September	0	0	0	0
11	30 September	0	0	0	0
12	1 October	0	0	0	0
13	2 October	0	0	0	0
14	3 October				
15	4 October				

== Competitors ==
The following is a list of the number of competitors representing Afghanistan that will participate at the Asian Games:

Sport	Men	Women	Total
Archery	0	1	1
Athletics	2	1	3
Boxing	3	1	4
Cricket	15	0	15
Cycling	0	3	3
Judo	2	0	2
Ju-jitsu	3	1	4
Karate	1	0	1
Kurash	3	0	3
Mixed martial arts	2	0	2
Swimming	2	0	2
Taewondo	2	0	2
Triathlon	1	0	1
Wrestling	2	0	2
Wushu	4	0	4
Total	43	7	50

== Archery ==
Recurve

Athlete	Event	Ranking round		Round of 48	Round of 32	Round of 16	Quarterfinals	Semifinals	Final / BM	
Athlete	Event	Score	Seed	Opposition Score	Opposition Score	Opposition Score	Opposition Score	Opposition Score	Opposition Score	Rank
Fatemeh Sadat Sadr	Women's individual	657	35B	Did not advance						46

== Athletics ==
Key

- Note–Ranks given for track events are within the athlete's heat only
- Q = Qualified for the next round
- q = Qualified for the next round as a fastest loser or, in field events, by position without achieving the qualifying target
- NR = National record
- N/A = Round not applicable for the event
- Bye = Athlete not required to compete in round

Track events

Athlete	Event	Heat		Semifinal		Final	
Athlete	Event	Result	Rank	Result	Rank	Result	Rank
SM Noor Zahi	Men's 100 m	Did not participate					
SM Noor Zahi	Men's 200 m	Did not participate					
Marwa Saleem	Women's 100 m	13.48	7	Did not advance			28
Marwa Saleem	Women's 200 m	28.94	7	Did not advance			25

Road events

Athlete	Event	Final	
Athlete	Event	Result	Rank
Mujtaba Faqirzada	Men's marathon	Did not participate	

== Boxing ==
Athlete	Event	Round of 32	Round of 16	Quarterfinals	Semifinals	Final	
Athlete	Event	Opposition Result	Opposition Result	Opposition Result	Opposition Result	Opposition Result	Rank
Emal Hamdam	Men's 60 kg	Al-fagay (QAT); W 5–0	Gunsila (SRI); W 4–1	Akmal (TJK); L 2–3	Did not advance		
Ibrahim Frootan	Men's 70 kg	Joonsu (KOR); L 1–4	Did not advance				
Silab Noori	Men's 90 kg	—N/a	Nurbek (KAZ); L 0–5	Did not advance			
Lala Kargar	Women's 54 kg	Ranasinghe (SRI); L 0–5	Did not advance				

Source : OSA

== Cricket ==
Summary

Team	Event	Group stage			Quarterfinal	Semifinal	Final / BM	
Team	Event	Opposition Score	Opposition Score	Rank	Opposition Score	Opposition Score	Opposition Score	Rank
Afghanistan men's	Men's tournament	Japan; W by 48 runs 129/6 (20)–81 (19.3)	Nepal; L by 5 wickets 102/7 (20)–103/5 (17.2)	2	India; L NR	Did not advance		7

=== Men's tournament ===
Head coach

- (England) Richard Pybus

Squad

- Darwish Rasooli (c)
- Abdullah Ahmadzai
- Mohammad Akram
- Ismat Alam
- Faridoon Dawoodzai
- Hassan Eisakhil
- Mohammad Ishaq (wk)
- Karim Janat
- Faisal Khan
- Nangyal Kharoti
- Imran Mir
- Arab Gul Momand
- Farmanullah Safi
- Khalid Taniwal
- Najibullah Zadran

Group Stage

Pos	Team	Pld	W	L	T	NR	Pts	NRR	Qualification
1	Nepal	2	1	0	0	1	3	0.842	Advanced to the knockout stage
2	Afghanistan	2	1	1	0	0	2	0.846	Advanced to the knockout stage
3	Japan (H)	2	0	1	0	1	1	−2.400	Eliminated

Source: Cricinfo
(H) Host

Match 1
24 September 2026
09:00
Scorecard

Afghanistan; 129/6 (20 overs)	v	Japan; 81 (19.3 overs)
Mohammad Akram 34 (29); Shoma Sugaya-Slater 2/18 (3 overs)		Reo Sakurano-Thomas 23 (24); Arab Gul 4/8 (4 overs)

Afghanistan won by 48 runs
Kōrogi Sports Park, Nisshin
Umpires: Faisal Afridi (Pak) and Nitin Menon (Ind)

- Japan won the toss and elected to field.

Match 3
25 September 2026
14:00
Scorecard

Afghanistan; 102/7 (20 overs)	v	Nepal; 103/5 (17.2 overs)
Faisal Shinozada 30 (33); Kushal Bhurtel 4/21 (4 overs)		Sundeep Jora 34 (35); Faridoon Dawoodzai 1/10 (3 overs)

Nepal won by 5 wickets
Kōrogi Sports Park, Nisshin
Umpires: Viswanadan Kalidas (Mas) and Gazi Sohel (Ban)

- Afghanistan won the toss and elected to bat.

Knockout stage

Quarter-finals
28 September – Nisshin
Pakistan	Abandoned
Hong Kong	Abandoned
29 September – Nisshin
Bangladesh	Abandoned
Malaysia	Abandoned
28 September – Nisshin
Afghanistan	Abandoned
India	Abandoned
29 September – Nisshin
Nepal	Abandoned
Sri Lanka	Abandoned

Semi-finals
1 October – Nisshin
Pakistan	112/4 (11.3)
Bangladesh	111/7 (13)
1 October – Nisshin
India	169/7 (20)
Sri Lanka	45 (9.5)

Gold medal match
3 October – Nisshin
Pakistan (silver)	192/6 (20)
India (gold)	211/6 (20)
Bronze medal match
3 October – Nisshin
Bangladesh	102 (17.3)
Sri Lanka (bronze)	165/9 (20)

Quarterfinal 2
28 September 2026
14:00
Scorecard

Afghanistan	v	India

Match abandoned
Kōrogi Sports Park, Nisshin
Umpires: Prageeth Rambukwella (SL) and Gazi Sohel (Ban)

- No toss.
- No play was possible due to rain.
- India advanced by virtue of being the higher-seeded team.

== Cycling ==
Sisters Fariba and Yulduz Hashimi as well as Zahra Rezayee represented Afghanistan in cycling. The Hashimis were noted to be based in Italy. The sisters fled from Afghanistan after the Taliban took over in 2021 and restricted women's sports in the country. Faribi Hashimi won a silver medal in the women's road race.

=== Road ===
Women

Athlete	Event	Time	Rank
Fariba Hashimi	Road race	2:50:05	2nd place, silver medalist(s)
Fariba Hashimi	Time trial	38:27.00	7
Yulduz Hashimi	Road race	3:02:07	29
Zahra Rezayee	Road race	OTL	—N/a

== Ju-jitsu ==
Athlete	Event	Round of 64	Round of 32	Round of 16	Quarterfinals	Semifinals	Repechage	Final / BM	
Athlete	Event	Opposition Result	Opposition Result	Opposition Result	Opposition Result	Opposition Result	Opposition Result	Opposition Result	Rank
Noorullah Shafayee	Men's –62 kg	—N/a	–	–	–	–	–	–	
Mohammad Sarwar Hussaini	Men's –69 kg	–	–	–	–	–	–	–	
Abdul Baset Rahimi	Men's –94 kg	—N/a	–	–	–	–	–	–	
Madineh Sharifi	Women's –63 kg	—N/a	–	–	–	–	–	–	

== Judo ==
Athlete	Event	Round of 32	Round of 16	Quarterfinals	Semifinals	Repechage	Final / BM	
Athlete	Event	Opposition Result	Opposition Result	Opposition Result	Opposition Result	Opposition Result	Opposition Result	Rank
Hikmatullah Rahmani	Men's –66 kg	Somnang (CAM) –	–	–	–	–	–	
Sayed Mohammad Sayedi	Men's –73 kg	–	–	–	–	–	–	

== Karate ==
Athlete	Event	Round of 16	Quarterfinals	Semifinals	Repechage	Final / BM	
Athlete	Event	Opposition Result	Opposition Result	Opposition Result	Opposition Result	Opposition Result	Rank
Mohammad Moner Rezayee	Men's kumite 55 kg	Disqualified by overweight					

== Kurash ==
Athlete	Event	Round of 32	Round of 16	Quarterfinal	Semifinal	Repechage	Final	
Athlete	Event	Opposition Result	Opposition Result	Opposition Result	Opposition Result	Opposition Result	Opposition Result	Rank
Merajuddin Chakmar	Men's −66 kg	—N/a	Kubanychbek (KGZ); L 0–3	Did not advance				9
Rahimullah Najmi	Men's −66 kg	—N/a	Jackielou (PHI); W 10–0	Akxror (UZB); L 0–10	Did not advance			5
Zabihullah Ehsani	Men's −81 kg	—N/a	Czar Augustus (PHI); W 10–0	Akxror (UZB); L 0–10	Did not advance			5

== Mixed martial arts ==
Athlete	Event	Preliminary	Quarterfinal	Semifinal	Final	
Athlete	Event	Opposition Result	Opposition Result	Opposition Result	Opposition Result	Rank
Sameallah Zaheri	Men's modern −71 kg	Did not participate				
Khalil Arsalani	Men's traditional −65 kg	Did not participate				

== Swimming ==
Men

Athlete	Event	Heat		Final	
Athlete	Event	Time	Rank	Time	Rank
Fahim Anwari	50 m freestyle	Did not participate			
Fahim Anwari	50 m breaststroke	1	9	31.86	39
Fahim Anwari	100 m breaststroke	1	4	1:11.06	34
Fahim Anwari	50 m butterfly	2	9	29.13	42
Mateen M. Sediq	800 m freestyle	—N/a		8:55.46	6
Mateen M. Sediq	1500 m freestyle	—N/a		16:58.48	20

== Taekwondo ==
Athlete	Event	Round of 16	Quarterfinals	Semifinals	Final	
Athlete	Event	Opposition Result	Opposition Result	Opposition Result	Opposition Result	Rank
Hikmatullah Zain	Men's –68 kg	–	–	–	–	
Ali Akbar Amiri	Men's +80 kg	–	–	–	–	

== Triathlon ==
Athlete	Event	Time						Rank
Athlete	Event	Swim (0.75 km)	Trans 1	Bike (20 km)	Trans 2	Run (5 km)	Total	Rank
Wais Khairandesh	Men's individual	12:52	0:48	Lapped				

== Wrestling ==
Afghanistan entered two wrestlers.

Key:

- VT (ranking points: 5–0 or 0–5) – Victory by fall.
- VB (ranking points: 5–0 or 0–5) – Victory by injury (VF for forfeit, VA for withdrawal or disqualification)
- PP (ranking points: 3–1 or 1–3) – Decision by points – the loser with technical points.
- PO (ranking points: 3–0 or 0–3) – Decision by points – the loser without technical points.
- ST (ranking points: 4–0 or 0–4) – Great superiority – the loser without technical points and a margin of victory of at least 8 (Greco-Roman) or 10 (freestyle) points.
- SP (ranking points: 4–1 or 1–4) – Technical superiority – the loser with technical points and a margin of victory of at least 8 (Greco-Roman) or 10 (freestyle) points.

Freestyle

Athlete	Event	Round of 32	Round of 16	Quarterfinal	Semifinal	Repechage	Final / BM	
Athlete	Event	Opposition Result	Opposition Result	Opposition Result	Opposition Result	Opposition Result	Opposition Result	Rank
Ahmad Mansoor Baryalai	Men's −57 kg	—N/a	Davaabandi (MGL); L 5–16	Did not advance				
Sayed Omar Zazai	Men's −65 kg	—N/a	Kalkal (IND); L 3–13^{VSU1}	Did not advance				

== Wushu ==
=== Sanda ===
Athlete	Event	Round of 16	Quarter-finals	Semi-finals	Final	
Athlete	Event	Opposition Score	Opposition Score	Opposition Score	Opposition Score	Rank
Shahzada Safi	Men's –56 kg	Aryan (IND); L 0–2	Did not advance			
Hamid Ashrafi	Men's –65 kg	Guo T.H. (MAC); W 2–0	Marbun (INA); W 2–0	Wang C. (CHN); L WPD	Did not advance	3rd place, bronze medalist(s)
Khalid Hotak	Men's –70 kg	Amer (YEM); W 2–0	Jumanta (INA); W 2–0	Ma S. (CHN); LWPD	Did not advance	3rd place, bronze medalist(s)
Mohammad Jafar Sultani	Men's –75 kg	Amankulov (KGZ); L 0–2	Did not advance			
