= Gymnastics at the 2026 Asian Games – Men's rings =

Men's rings at the 2026 Asian Games
- Venue: Nippon Gaishi Hall Rainbow Hall
- Date: 21 September 2026 (Qualification); 24 September 2026 (Final)
- Competitors: 8 from 5 nations

Medalists
gold medal	Lan Xingyu	China
silver medal	Kiichi Kaneta	Japan
bronze medal	Zou Jingyuan	China

The men's rings competition at the 2026 Asian Games took place on 24 September 2026 at Nippon Gaishi Hall Rainbow Hall.

== Schedule ==
All times are Japan Standard Time (UTC+09:00)

Date	Time	Event
Monday, 21 September 2026	10:00	Qualification
Thursday, 24 September 2026	20:25	Final

== Qualification ==
Rank	Gymnast	D Score	E Score	Pen.	Bon.	Total	Qual.
1	Lan Xingyu (CHN)	6.0	9.100		0.1	15.200	Q
2	Kiichi Kaneta (JPN)	5.4	9.100		0.1	14.600	Q
3	Zou Jingyuan (CHN)	5.6	8.666			14.266	Q
4	Zhang Boheng (CHN)	5.5	8.733			14.233	–
5	Shinnosuke Oka (JPN)	5.1	8.900			14.000	~~Q~~ WD
6	Tang Chia-hung (TPE)	5.0	8.766		0.1	13.866	Q
7	Siavash Siyahi (IRI)	5.2	8.666			13.866	Q
8	Nguyễn Văn Khánh Phong (VIE)	5.3	8.533			13.833	Q
9	Sun Wei (CHN)	5.0	8.766			13.766	–
10	Daiki Hashimoto (JPN)	5.1	8.633			13.733	–
11	Mehdi Ahmad Kohani (IRI)	5.0	8.633			13.633	Q
12	Lee Jung-hyo (KOR)	5.1	8.500			13.600	R1 Sub
13	Carlos Yulo (PHI)	4.9	8.500		0.1	13.500	R2
14	Mehrdad Ghadimi (QAT)	5.5	7.900			13.400	R3

== Final ==
Rank	Gymnast	D Score	E Score	Pen.	Bon.	Total
1st place, gold medalist(s)	Lan Xingyu (CHN)	6.0	8.933			14.933
2nd place, silver medalist(s)	Kiichi Kaneta (JPN)	5.6	9.033		0.1	14.733
3rd place, bronze medalist(s)	Zou Jingyuan (CHN)	5.8	8.700		0.1	14.600
4	Nguyễn Văn Khánh Phong (VIE)	5.6	8.533			14.133
5	Siavash Siyahi (IRI)	5.2	8.733			13.933
6	Tang Chia-hung (TPE)	5.0	8.666			13.666
7	Lee Jung-hyo (KOR)	5.1	7.966			13.066
8	Mehdi Ahmad Kohani (IRI)	5.3	7.733			13.033
