= Gymnastics at the 2026 Asian Games – Men's pommel horse =

Men's pommel horse at the 2026 Asian Games
- Venue: Nippon Gaishi Hall Rainbow Hall
- Date: 21 September 2026 (Qualification); 24 September 2026 (Final)
- Competitors: 8 from 5 nations

Medalists
gold medal	Utkirbek Juraev	Uzbekistan
silver medal	Arman Khodaei	Iran
bronze medal	Daiki Hashimoto	Japan

The men's pommel horse competition at the 2026 Asian Games took place on 24 September 2026 at Nippon Gaishi Hall Rainbow Hall.

== Schedule ==
All times are Japan Standard Time (UTC+09:00)

Date	Time	Event
Monday, 21 September 2026	10:00	Qualification
Thursday, 24 September 2026	18:35	Final

== Qualification ==
Rank	Gymnast	D Score	E Score	Pen.	Total	Qual.
1	Daiki Hashimoto (JPN)	5.7	8.800		14.500	Q
2	Ravshan Kamiljanov (UZB)	5.4	9.066		14.466	Q
3	Lee Chih-kai (TPE)	5.7	8.733		14.433	Q
4	Arman Khodaei (IRI)	5.5	8.900		14.400	Q
5	Utkirbek Juraev (UZB)	5.6	8.800		14.400	Q
6	Shiao Yu-jan (TPE)	5.7	8.633		14.333	Q
7	Đặng Ngọc Xuân Thiện (VIE)	5.6	8.700		14.300	Q
8	Shoma Tuskiyama (JPN)	5.5	8.766		14.266	Q
9	Zou Jingyuan (CHN)	5.2	9.000		14.200	R1
9	Sun Wei (CHN)	5.2	9.000		14.200	R1
11	Nariman Kurbanov (KAZ)	5.5	8.700		14.200	R3

== Final ==
Rank	Gymnast	D Score	E Score	Pen.	Total
1st place, gold medalist(s)	Utkirbek Juraev (UZB)	5.6	9.133		14.733
2nd place, silver medalist(s)	Arman Khodaei (IRI)	5.7	8.866		14.566
3rd place, bronze medalist(s)	Daiki Hashimoto (JPN)	5.7	8.800		14.500
4	Đặng Ngọc Xuân Thiện (VIE)	5.6	8.800		14.400
5	Lee Chih-kai (TPE)	5.7	8.633		14.333
6	Shoma Tuskiyama (JPN)	5.1	7.700		12.800
7	Shiao Yu-jan (TPE)	5.5	7.300		12.800
8	Ravshan Kamiljanov (UZB)	5.0	7.733		12.733
