= Wushu at the 2026 Asian Games – Men's sanda 70 kg =

Men's sanda 70 kg at the 2026 Asian Games
- Venue: Aichi Budokan
- Dates: 20–24 September 2026
- Competitors: 14 from 14 nations

Medalists
gold medal	Ma Shuo	China
silver medal	Erfan Moharrami	Iran
bronze medal	Khalid Hotak	Afghanistan
bronze medal	Alizhan Ablagatov	Kazakhstan

The men's sanda 70 kilograms competition at the 2026 Asian Games in Nagoya, Japan was held from 20 to 24 September 2026 at the Aichi Prefectural Martial Arts Hall.

A total of fourteen competitors from fourteen countries (NOCs) competed in this event, limited to fighters whose body weight was less than 70 kilograms.

Competition bouts consist of 3 rounds in total, each lasting two minutes with a one-minute rest period between rounds. The athlete who scores more points in each round is the winner of that rounds; the bout ends when one athlete has won two rounds (and thus the match).

Ma Shuo from China won the gold medal.

== Schedule ==
All times are Japan Standard Time (UTC+09:00)

Date	Time	Event
Sunday, 20 September 2026	18:00	1/8 finals
Tuesday, 22 September 2026	18:00	Quarterfinals
Wednesday, 23 September 2026	18:00	Semifinals
Thursday, 24 September 2026	09:30	Final

== Results ==
Legend

- KO — Won by knockout
- PD — Won by point difference

1/8 finals
Abror Khakimov (KGZ)	2
Phonh Saibounpheng (LAO)	0
Mohammed Amer (YEM)	0
Khalid Hotak (AFG)	2
Anushervon Kamolzoda (TJK)	0
Jumanta (INA)	2
Cheung Yat Lam (HKG)	0
Erfan Moharrami (IRI)	2
Sadam Hussain (PAK)	0
Jang Sae-young (KOR)	2
Trương Văn Chương (VIE)	2
Un Iat Wai (MAC)	0

Quarterfinals
Ma Shuo (CHN)	PD
Abror Khakimov (KGZ)
Khalid Hotak (AFG)	2
Jumanta (INA)	0
Erfan Moharrami (IRI)	2
Jang Sae-young (KOR)	0
Trương Văn Chương (VIE)
Alizhan Ablagatov (KAZ)	KO

Semifinals
Ma Shuo (CHN)	PD
Khalid Hotak (AFG)
Erfan Moharrami (IRI)	PD
Alizhan Ablagatov (KAZ)

Final
Ma Shuo (CHN)	2
Erfan Moharrami (IRI)	0
