= Cycling at the 2026 Asian Games – Women's individual time trial =

Women's individual time trial at the 2026 Asian Games
- Venue: Shinshiro Cycling Road Course
- Date: 20 September 2026
- Competitors: 15 from 15 nations

Medalists
| gold medal | Rinata Sultanova | Kazakhstan |
| silver medal | Zhang Hao | China |
| bronze medal | Shin Ji-eun | South Korea |

The women's 24.2 kilometres road time trial competition at the 2026 Asian Games took place on 20 September 2026 in Shinshiro Cycling Road Course.

== Schedule ==
All times are Japan Standard Time (UTC+09:00)

| Date | Time | Event |
|---|---|---|
| Sunday, 20 September 2026 | 09:00 | Final |

== Results ==
| Rank | Athlete | Time |
|---|---|---|
| 1st place, gold medalist(s) | Rinata Sultanova (KAZ) | 36:23.72 |
| 2nd place, silver medalist(s) | Zhang Hao (CHN) | 36:28.40 |
| 3rd place, bronze medalist(s) | Shin Ji-eun (KOR) | 36:56.14 |
| 4 | Leung Wing Yee (SGP) | 38:00.87 |
| 5 | Yanina Kuskova (UZB) | 38:14.28 |
| 6 | Akari Kobayashi (JPN) | 38:22.82 |
| 7 | Fariba Hashimi (AFG) | 38:27.00 |
| 8 | Phetdarin Somrat (THA) | 39:50.48 |
| 9 | Zeng Ke-xin (TPE) | 40:02.79 |
| 10 | Enkhjin Gantogtokh (MGL) | 40:11.18 |
| 11 | Ayustina Delia Priatna (INA) | 40:49.58 |
| 12 | Safia Al Sayegh (UAE) | 40:50.45 |
| 13 | Mandana Dehghan (IRI) | 41:05.39 |
| 14 | Au Hoi Ian (MAC) | 44:53.19 |
| | Lolwa Al-Marri (QAT) | DNS |
