= Zhang Hao (cyclist) =

Chinese cyclist

Hao Zhang
Personal information
- Born: 10 June 2000 (age 26)

Cycling career
- Sport: Cycling
- Current team: XDS China Women Team
- Discipline: Road
- Role: Rider

Professional teams
- 2024: China Liv Pro Cycling
- 2026–: XDS China Women Team
Medal record
Representing China
Women's road bicycle racing
Asian Championships
Gold medal – first place	2026	Road Race
Bronze medal – third place	2026	Time Trial
Asian Games
Silver medal – second place	2026 Aichi–Nagoya	Time trial

Hao Zhang (born 10 June 2000) is a Chinese professional racing cyclist who rides for the UCI women's continental team XDS China Women Team.

She is the 2026 2024 Chinese national road race champion and 2026 national time trial champion. At the 2026 Asian Road Cycling Championships she won the road race and finished third in the time trial. At the 2026 Asian Games, she won the silver medal in the women's time trial event.

== Major results ==
2024
1st Road race, National Championships

2026
Road Race, Asian Championships
1st Time trial, National Championships
1st Overall Grand Prix Fergana Ladies

1st Stage 1

2026 Asian Games

Time trial
4th Road race

Time trial, Asian Continental Championships
3rd Overall Tour of Bostonliq Ladies

3rd Stage 1
3rd Stage 2

8th Overall BIWASE Cup

3rd Stage 2
