= Taekwondo at the 2026 Asian Games – Women's 67 kg =

Taekwondo competition

Women's 67 kg at the 2026 Asian Games
- Venue: Toyohashi City General Gymnasium
- Date: 2 October 2026
- Competitors: 15 from 15 nations

Medalists
gold medal	Saghar Moradi	Iran
silver medal	Ozoda Sobirjonova	Uzbekistan
bronze medal	Wang Wei-chia	Chinese Taipei
bronze medal	Kwak Min-ju	South Korea

The women's 67 kilograms event at the 2026 Asian Games took place on 2 October 2026 at Toyohashi City General Gymnasium, Toyohashi, Japan.

Each bout consisted of up to three rounds, lasting two minutes apiece. The athlete who scored more points in each round was the winner of that round; the bout finished when one athlete had won two rounds (and thus the match).

Saghar Moradi from Iran won the gold medal.

== Schedule ==
All times are Japan Standard Time (UTC+09:00)

Date	Time	Event
Friday, 2 October 2026	13:30	Round of 16
Friday, 2 October 2026	13:30	Quarterfinals
Friday, 2 October 2026	17:10	Semifinals
Friday, 2 October 2026	17:10	Gold medal contest

== Results ==
Round of 16
Maram Fatnassi (QAT)	0	0
Xing Jiani (CHN)	15	9
Wang Wei-chia (TPE)	2	11
Trần Thị Ánh Tuyết (VIE)	2	11
Tamiris Sulaimanova (KGZ)	8	12
Cathy Ho (HKG)	2	3
Laila Delo (PHI)	0	0
Ozoda Sobirjonova (UZB)	6	12
Sasikarn Tongchan (THA)	9	10
Ganzorigiin Enkhchimeg (MGL)	2	1
Dorjee Yangkee (BHU)	0	2
Kwak Min-ju (KOR)	15	18
Razan Al-Rawashdeh (JOR)	11	17
Amna Al-Loghani (UAE)	0	0

Quarterfinals
Xing Jiani (CHN)	9	10	4
Wang Wei-chia (TPE)	11	2	11
Tamiris Sulaimanova (KGZ)	1	1
Saghar Moradi (IRI)	9	13
Ozoda Sobirjonova (UZB)	2	3	14
Sasikarn Tongchan (THA)	2	10	4
Kwak Min-ju (KOR)	7	9
Razan Al-Rawashdeh (JOR)	6	1

Semifinals
Wang Wei-chia (TPE)	3	5
Saghar Moradi (IRI)	14	7
Ozoda Sobirjonova (UZB)	13	21
Kwak Min-ju (KOR)	3	2

Gold medal contest
Saghar Moradi (IRI)	8	16
Ozoda Sobirjonova (UZB)	8	11
