= Kiichi Kaneta =

Japanese gymnast (born 2001)

- 金田 希一
- Born: 12 November 2001 (age 25) Tokyo, Japan

Gymnastics career
- Discipline: Men's artistic gymnastics
- Country represented: Japan
- Club: Sohgo Gymnastics Club
Medal record
Men's artistic gymnastics
Representing Japan
Asian Games
Silver medal – second place	2026 Aichi–Nagoya	Team
Silver medal – second place	2026 Aichi–Nagoya	Rings
FIG World Cup
Event / 1st / 2nd / 3rd; Apparatus World Cup / 0 / 0 / 1
- Education: National Institute of Fitness and Sports in Kanoya

Kiichi Kaneta (Japanese: 金田 希一, born 12 November 2001) is a Japanese artistic gymnast who competes for Sohgo Gymnastics Club. He specialises in the rings and has won medals at Japanese national championships and international competitions. At the 2026 Asian Games, he won silver medals in the men's team all-around and individual rings events.

== Career ==
=== University career ===
Kaneta attended Ichifuna High School before enrolling at the National Institute of Fitness and Sports in Kanoya in 2020. He competed for the university's gymnastics team and served as its captain. During his university career, he achieved strong results in the rings and other apparatus at national student competitions.

In 2022, Kaneta won the rings event at the All-Japan Student Gymnastics Championships. He also competed at the 2022 FIG Artistic Gymnastics World Cup event in Paris, where he finished sixth in floor exercise and fourth in parallel bars.

In 2023, Kaneta won the rings title at the All-Japan Artistic Gymnastics Event Championships and repeated his student rings title. He was also part of the Kanoya team that won the men's team competition at the National Sports Festival of Japan held in Kagoshima that year.

Kaneta graduated from the National Institute of Fitness and Sports in Kanoya in 2024 and joined Sohgo Gymnastics Club. In 2024, he won the rings event at the 78th All-Japan Artistic Gymnastics Individual Event Championships.

=== Senior career ===
Kaneta continued to compete in national and international events after joining Sohgo Gymnastics Club. At the 79th All-Japan Artistic Gymnastics Event Championships in November 2025, he finished second in the rings final with a score of 14.633.

In March 2026, Kaneta competed at the FIG Artistic Gymnastics World Cup in Baku, Azerbaijan. He won the bronze medal in the rings final, finishing among the medalists in the event.

In May 2026, Kaneta was named to Japan's national artistic gymnastics team for the 2026 season. He was subsequently selected for Japan's men's team at the 2026 Asian Games.

At the 2026 Asian Games in Aichi–Nagoya, Japan, Kaneta competed in the men's artistic gymnastics competition. He helped Japan finish second in the men's team all-around, earning the silver medal with a team score of 253.826 points. He also qualified for the individual rings final. In the rings final, Kaneta scored 14.733 points to finish second and win his second silver medal of the Games. His results made him one of Japan's medal-winning gymnasts at the competition.
