= Gymnastics at the 2022 Asian Games – Men's vault =

Men's vault at the 2022 Asian Games
- Venue: Huanglong Gymnasium
- Date: 24–29 September 2023
- Competitors: 16 from 11 nations

Medalists
gold medal	Wataru Tanigawa	Japan
silver medal	Mehdi Olfati	Iran
bronze medal	Sharul Aimy	Malaysia

The men's vault competition at the 2022 Asian Games took place on 24 and 29 September 2023 at the Huanglong Sports Centre Gymnasium.

== Schedule ==
All times are China Standard Time (UTC+08:00)

Date	Time	Event
Sunday, 24 September 2023	10:00	Qualification
Friday, 29 September 2023	14:30	Final

== Results ==
=== Qualification ===
Rank	Athlete	Vault 1	Vault 2	Total
1	Wataru Tanigawa (JPN)	15.233	14.833	15.033
2	Mehdi Olfati (IRI)	14.866	14.266	14.566
3	Ng Ka Ki (HKG)	14.566	14.133	14.349
4	Shin Jea-hwan (KOR)	14.466	14.133	14.299
5	Tikumporn Surintornta (THA)	14.333	14.233	14.283
6	Sharul Aimy (MAS)	14.266	14.166	14.216
7	Trịnh Hải Khang (VIE)	14.600	13.733	14.166
8	Asadbek Azamov (UZB)	14.133	13.966	14.049
9	Assan Salimov (KAZ)	13.866	14.200	14.033
10	Miguel Besana (PHI)	13.966	14.100	14.033
11	Khumoyun Islomov (UZB)	14.200	13.800	14.000
12	Justine Ace De Leon (PHI)	13.933	13.633	13.783
13	Kim Han-sol (KOR)	13.200	14.333	13.766
14	Rustambek Nematov (UZB)	13.733	12.366	13.049
15	Jim Man Hin (HKG)	12.766	12.933	12.849
16	Nadila Nethviru (SRI)	13.433	11.966	12.699

=== Final ===
Rank	Athlete	Vault 1	Vault 2	Total
1st place, gold medalist(s)	Wataru Tanigawa (JPN)	15.266	14.766	15.016
2nd place, silver medalist(s)	Mehdi Olfati (IRI)	14.933	14.633	14.783
3rd place, bronze medalist(s)	Sharul Aimy (MAS)	14.533	14.400	14.466
4	Shin Jea-hwan (KOR)	13.766	14.533	14.149
5	Tikumporn Surintornta (THA)	14.300	13.900	14.100
6	Asadbek Azamov (UZB)	14.100	13.900	14.000
7	Ng Ka Ki (HKG)	14.200	13.400	13.800
8	Trịnh Hải Khang (VIE)	13.200	14.233	13.716
