= Majid Vahid =

Iranian kurash and judoka (born 2000)

Personal information
- Full name: Majid Vahid Barimanlou
- Nationality: Iranian
- Born: 2 July 2000 (age 26) Bojnord
- Occupations: Kurash & Judo
- Height: 1.69 m (5 ft 7 in)
- Website: instagram

Sport
- Country: Iran
- Sport: Kurash & Judo
- Weight class: –66 kg
Medal record
Men's kurash
Representing Iran
Asian Games
Gold medal – first place	2026 Aichi-Nagoya	66 kg
Silver medal – second place	2022 Hangzhou	66 kg
World Championships
Silver medal – second place	2023 Ashgabat	66kg
Asian Championship
Silver medal – second place	2023 Hangzhou	66kg
Silver medal – second place	2024 Tehran	66kg

Profile at external databases
- IJF: 34503
- JudoInside.com: 108748

Majid Vahid Barimanlou (Persian: مجید وحید بریمانلو; born 2 July 2000) is an Iranian kurash and judoka.

He participated at the 2023 World Kurash Championships winning a silver medal. He won a silver medal at the 2022 Asian Games in Hangzhou. He won a silver medal at the World c'ship.
