= Wushu at the 2022 Asian Games – Men's sanda 70 kg =

Men's sanda 70 kg at the 2022 Asian Games
- Venue: Xiaoshan Guali Sports Centre
- Dates: 24–28 September 2023
- Competitors: 13 from 13 nations

Medalists
gold medal	He Feng	China
silver medal	Mohsen Mohammadseifi	Iran
bronze medal	Zhang Huan-yi	Chinese Taipei
bronze medal	Khalid Hotak	Afghanistan

The men's sanda 70 kilograms competition at the 2022 Asian Games in Hangzhou, China was held from 24 to 28 September 2023 at the Xiaoshan Guali Sports Centre.

A total of thirteen competitors from thirteen countries (NOCs) competed in this event, limited to fighters whose body weight was less than 70 kilograms.

Competition bouts consist of 3 rounds in total, each lasting two minutes with a one-minute rest period between rounds. The athlete who scores more points in each round is the winner of that rounds; the bout ends when one athlete has won two rounds (and thus the match).

He Fong of China won the gold after beating 3 times Asian Games gold medalists Mohsen Mohammadseifi in the final in three rounds.

== Schedule ==
All times are China Standard Time (UTC+08:00)

Date	Time	Event
Sunday, 24 September 2023	19:30	1/8 finals
Tuesday, 26 September 2023	19:30	Quarterfinals
Wednesday, 27 September 2023	19:30	Semifinals
Thursday, 28 September 2023	09:30	Final

== Results ==
Legend

- KO — Won by knockout

1/8 finals
Mohsen Mohammadseifi (IRI)	2
Song Gi-cheol (KOR)	0
Phonh Saibounpheng (LAO)	2
Padam Rai (NEP)	0
Zhang Huan-yi (TPE)	2
Harry Brahmana (INA)	0
Nguyễn Văn Tài (VIE)	0
He Feng (CHN)	2
Nursultan Izmurzayev (KAZ)	0
Khalid Hotak (AFG)	2

Quarterfinals
Mekan Paltaýew (TKM)	0
Mohsen Mohammadseifi (IRI)	2
Phonh Saibounpheng (LAO)	0
Zhang Huan-yi (TPE)	2
Mukhammadali Yuldashev (UZB)	0
He Feng (CHN)	2
Khalid Hotak (AFG)	KO
Suraj Yadav (IND)

Semifinals
Mohsen Mohammadseifi (IRI)	2
Zhang Huan-yi (TPE)	0
He Feng (CHN)	2
Khalid Hotak (AFG)	0

Final
Mohsen Mohammadseifi (IRI)	1
He Feng (CHN)	2
