= Gymnastics at the 2026 Asian Games – Men's vault =

Men's vault at the 2026 Asian Games
- Venue: Nippon Gaishi Hall Rainbow Hall
- Date: 21 September 2026 (Qualification); 25 September 2026 (Final)
- Competitors: 8 from 5 nations

Medalists
gold medal	Carlos Yulo	Philippines
silver medal	Mahdi Olfati	Iran
bronze medal	Ng Ka Ki	Hong Kong

The men's vault competition at the 2026 Asian Games took place on 25 September 2026 at Nippon Gaishi Hall Rainbow Hall.

== Schedule ==
All times are Japan Standard Time (UTC+09:00)

Date	Time	Event
Monday, 21 September 2026	10:00	Qualification
Friday, 25 September 2026	15:00	Final

== Qualification ==
Rank	Gymnast	Vault 1					Vault 2					Total	Qual.
Rank	Gymnast	D Score	E Score	Pen.	Bon.	Score 1	D Score	E Score	Pen.	Bon.	Score 2	Total	Qual.
1	Ng Ka Ki (HKG)	5.2	8.966			14.166	5.2	8.966			14.166	14.166	Q
2	Kim Jae-ho (KOR)	5.2	9.266			14.466	5.2	8.933	-0.3		13.833	14.149	Q
3	Mahdi Olfati (IRI)	5.6	9.366			14.966	5.2	8.100	-0.1		13.200	14.083	Q
4	Miguel Besana (PHI)	5.2	8.866			14.066	4.8	9.000			13.800	13.933	Q
5	Sharul Aimy (MAS)	4.8	9.000			13.800	4.8	9.066			13.866	13.833	Q
6	Trịnh Hải Khang (VIE)	5.2	8.266	-0.1		13.366	5.2	8.933	-0.1		14.033	13.700	Q
7	Carlos Yulo (PHI)	5.2	7.966			13.166	5.2	8.933			14.133	13.649	Q
8	Enkhtuvshin Damdindorj (MGL)	4.8	8.666			13.466	4.4	8.866	-0.3		12.966	13.216	Q
9	Nurtan Idrissov (KAZ)	4.8	9.066			13.866	4.8	7.900	-0.3		12.400	13.133	R1
10	Rajib Chakma (BAN)	4.4	8.966			13.366	4.8	7.866			12.666	13.016	R2
11	Asher Pua (SGP)	4.4	8.333			12.733	2.8	8.833			11.633	12.183	R3

== Final ==
Rank	Gymnast	Vault 1					Vault 2					Total
Rank	Gymnast	D Score	E Score	Pen.	Bon.	Score 1	D Score	E Score	Pen.	Bon.	Score 2	Total
1st place, gold medalist(s)	Carlos Yulo (PHI)	5.6	9.133			14.733	5.2	9.266			14.466	14.599
2nd place, silver medalist(s)	Mahdi Olfati (IRI)	5.6	9.400		0.1	15.100	5.2	8.866	-0.1		13.966	14.533
3rd place, bronze medalist(s)	Ng Ka Ki (HKG)	5.2	9.033			14.233	5.2	8.800			14.000	14.116
4	Kim Jae-ho (KOR)	5.2	9.300			14.500	4.4	9.133			13.533	14.016
5	Miguel Besana (PHI)	5.2	8.66	-0.1		13.766	4.8	9.000			13.800	13.783
6	Enkhtuvshin Damdindorj (MGL)	4.8	9.100			13.900	4.4	9.166			13.566	13.733
7	Trịnh Hải Khang (VIE)	4.8	8.566			13.366	5.2	8.866			14.066	13.716
8	Sharul Aimy (MAS)	4.8	8.733			13.533	4.8	8.766	-0.1		13.466	13.499
