= Saghar Moradi =

Iranian Taekwondo athlete

Personal information
- Full name: Saghar moradi Sheikhlar
- Nationality: Iranian
- Born: April 16, 2007 (age 19) Tehran, Iran

Sport
- Country: Iran
- Sport: Taekwondo
- Weight class: 67 Kg
- Coached by: Mahrouz Saei (National Team)
Medal record
Women's Taekwondo
Representing Iran
Asian Games
Gold medal – first place	2026 Aichi-Nagoya	67 kg
World Cup Team
Gold medal – first place	2024 Chuncheon	Women's Team
World Junior Championships
Silver medal – second place	2022 Sofia	63 kg
Silver medal – second place	2024 Chuncheon	63 kg
Asian Junior Championships
Gold medal – first place	2022 Hô Chi Minh	63 kg
Gold medal – first place	2024 Beirut	63 kg

Saghar Moradi (Persian: ساغر مرادی ; born 2007 In Tehran) is an Iranian Taekwondo athlete. She won a gold medal at the 2024 World Cup Team Championships.

== Career ==
=== 2026 Asian Games ===
At the 2026 Asian Games in Nagoya, Japan, Moradi competed in the women's -67 kg division. She received a bye in the opening round before facing Tamiris Sulaimanova of Kyrgyzstan. Moradi won in two straight rounds to advance to the semifinals, guaranteeing herself at least a bronze medal.

In the semifinals, she faced Wang Wei-Chia of Chinese Taipei. Moradi dominated the opening round 14-3. The second round was closer, but she came from behind to win 7-5 and secure her place in the final.

In the final, she competed against Ozoda Sobirjonova of Uzbekistan. The first round ended in an 8-8 tie, but Moradi was awarded the round on a countback for scoring more successful attacks. She then won the second round 16-11 to claim the gold medal. This victory marked Iran's first-ever women's taekwondo gold at the Asian Games and was Iran's 15th gold medal at the Nagoya Games.
