= Mahdi Olfati =

Iranian artistic gymnast

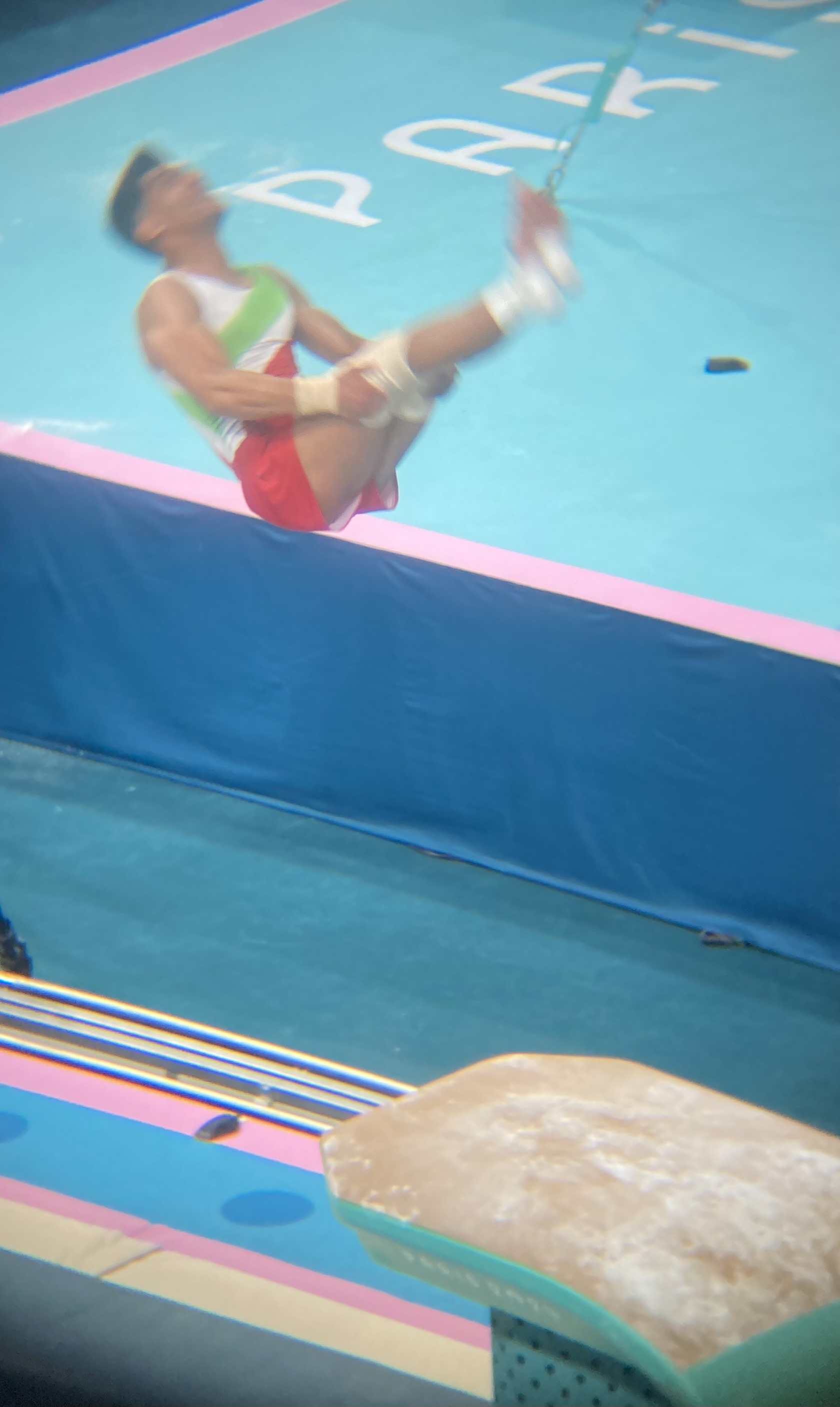
- Olfati vaulting at the 2024 Olympic Games

Personal information
- Born: 6 March 2001 (age 25) Gorgan, Iran

Gymnastics career
- Discipline: Men's artistic gymnastics
- Country represented: Iran; (2017–present)
Medal record
Representing Iran
Men's artistic gymnastics
Asian Games
Silver medal – second place	2022 Hangzhou	Vault
Silver medal – second place	2026 Aichi–Nagoya	Vault
Asian Championships
Gold medal – first place	2025 Jecheon	Vault
Bronze medal – third place	2026 Zunyi	Vault
FIG World Cup
Event / 1st / 2nd / 3rd; World Cup / 0 / 2 / 0

Mahdi Olfati (Persian: مهدی الفتی; born 6 March 2001) is an Iranian artistic gymnast. He qualified to represent Iran at the 2024 Summer Olympics through the 2024 FIG World Cup series. He finished seventh in the Olympic vault final. At the 2022 Asian Games, he won a silver medal on the vault. He was the first Iranian gymnast to win a medal at the Asian Games.

== Career ==
Olfati began gymnastics when he was seven years old and joined the Iranian national team in 2017. At the 2017 Junior Asian Championships, he finished eighth on the vault. He placed ninth in the all-around at the 2018 Junior Asian Championships.

Olfati finished sixth in the vault final at the 2021 Doha World Cup. He competed with the Iranian team that finished seventh at the 2022 Asian Championships.

Olfati won a silver medal on the vault at the 2023 Cottbus World Cup. He also competed at the 2023 World Cups in Doha and Baku, finishing eighth and fourth on the vault, respectively. He then represented Iran at the 2022 Asian Games, which were held in 2023 due to the COVID-19 pandemic. He won the silver medal on the vault, marking the first time Iran won a gymnastics medal at the Asian Games.

Olfati competed in the 2024 FIG World Cup series to earn points for Olympic qualification. At the first event in Cairo, he finished fifth in the vault final. He then won the silver medal at the Cottbus World Cup. With his results on the World Cup series, he earned a berth for the 2024 Olympic Games. He became the first Iranian gymnast to compete at the Olympic Games since Jalal Bazargan Vali in 1964. He was selected to be Iran's flagbearer in the opening ceremonies alongside Neda Shahsavari. He finished seventh in the vault final with an average score of 14.266.

During the qualification of the 2025 Asian Championships, Olfati presented a new vault called a yurchenko full-twisting double tucked. As he is the first man to perform it in an international competition, it now carries his name and was attributed a 5.6 value in the CoP 2025-2028. He won the gold medal during the vault final.

== Eponymous skill ==
Olfati has one skill named after him in the Code of Points.

Apparatus	Name	Description	Difficulty (Note: Valid for the 2025–2028 Code of Points)	Added to the Code of Points
Vault	Olfati	Yurchenko entry on – backward tucked with 1/1 turn	5.6	2025 Asian Championships
