= Khalid Hotak =

Afghan wushu practitioner

Personal information
- Nationality: Afghan
- Born: 1 August 1991 (age 35)

Sport
- Sport: Wushu
- Coached by: Mahfooz Wafaa
Medal record
Representing Afghanistan
Men's sanda
Asian Games
Bronze medal – third place	2018 Jakarta	65 kg
Bronze medal – third place	2022 Hangzhou	70 kg
Bronze medal – third place	2026 Aichi–Nagoya	70 kg
World Championships
Bronze medal – third place	2013 Kuala Lumpur	60 kg

Khalid Hotak (born 1 August 1991) is an Afghan wushu practitioner. He represented Afghanistan at the 2018 Asian Games in the men's sanda 65 kg category, winning a bronze medal. Hotak also won a bronze medal at the 2022 Asian Games in the men's sanda 70 kg category. He works as a sports advisor in Afghanistan.

== Career ==
In 2015, Hotak won a gold medal at the West Asian Wushu Championship.
