= Fatemeh Amini (sport shooter) =

Iranian Shooting Athlete

Personal information
- Full name: Fatemeh Amini Pozveh
- Nationality: Iranian
- Born: October 5, 2000 (age 25) Isfahan, Iran

Sport
- Country: Iran
- Sport: Shooting
- Event: 10m Air Rifle
- Coached by: Maryam Talebi (National Team)
Medal record
Event	1st	2nd	3rd
World Cup	–	–	1
Asian Championships	–	–	1
Asian Junior Championships	–	–	1
Women's Shooting
Representing Iran
World Cup
Bronze medal – third place	2022 Rio De Janeiro	10m Air Rifle Team
Asian Championships
Bronze medal – third place	2024 Jakarta	10m Air Rifle Team
- Updated on 21 July 2024

Fatemeh "Neda" Amini Pozveh (Persian: فاطمه امینی‌پژوه; born 5 October 2000 In Isfahan) Is an Iranian Shooting Athlete.‌ She will represent Iran at the 2024 Summer Olympics in Paris.

== 2024 Summer Olympic ==
Year	Host	Event	Qualification		Final	Ref
2024	Paris, France	10 metre air rifle	626.6	26	Did not advance	
