= Kurash at the 2022 Asian Games – Men's +90 kg =

Men's +90 kg at the 2022 Asian Games
- Venue: Xiaoshan Linpu Gymnasium
- Dates: 30 September 2023
- Competitors: 12 from 12 nations

Medalists
gold medal	Mukhsin Khisomiddinov	Uzbekistan
bronze medal	Jeong Jun-yong	South Korea
bronze medal	Kunathip Yea-on	Thailand

The men's +90 kilograms Kurash competition at the 2022 Asian Games in Hangzhou was held on 30 September 2023 at the Xiaoshan Linpu Gymnasium.

Kurash is a traditional martial art from Uzbekistan that resembles Wrestling. There are three assessment system in Kurash, namely Halal, Yambosh, and Chala.

== Schedule ==
All times are China Standard Time (UTC+08:00)

Date	Time	Event
Saturday, 30 September 2023	09:30	Round of 16
Saturday, 30 September 2023	09:30	Quarterfinals
Saturday, 30 September 2023	14:00	Semifinals
Saturday, 30 September 2023	14:00	Final

== Results ==
Round of 16
Husein Misri (KUW)	000
Jeong Jun-yong (KOR)	010
Tejen Tejenow (TKM)	002
Nurdaulet Zharylgapov (KAZ)	001
Ölziibayaryn Düürenbayar (MGL)	000
Mansour Sarwari (AFG)	101
Chen Chien-hung (TPE)	000
Mukhsin Khisomiddinov (UZB)	101

Quarterfinals
Nacif Elias (LBN)	002
Jeong Jun-yong (KOR)	010
Tejen Tejenow (TKM)	012
Bekbolot Toktogonov (KGZ)	010
Kunathip Yea-on (THA)	001
Mansour Sarwari (AFG)	000
Mukhsin Khisomiddinov (UZB)	101
Ali Ridha (IRQ)	000

Semifinals
Jeong Jun-yong (KOR)	000
Tejen Tejenow (TKM)	100
Kunathip Yea-on (THA)	000
Mukhsin Khisomiddinov (UZB)	010

Final
Tejen Tejenow (TKM)	000
Mukhsin Khisomiddinov (UZB)	010

- Tejen Tejenow of Turkmenistan originally won the silver medal, but was disqualified after he tested positive for DHCMT and Methasterone.
