= Kurash at the 2026 Asian Games – Women's 57 kg =

Women's 57 kg at the 2026 Asian Games
- Venue: Aichi Budokan
- Dates: 27 September 2026
- Competitors: 21 from 12 nations

Medalists
gold medal	Ibodatkhon Agojonova	Uzbekistan
silver medal	Lee Wan-ting	Chinese Taipei
bronze medal	Wang Pin-chun	Chinese Taipei
bronze medal	Natsumi Kuroki	Japan

The women's 57 kilograms Kurash competition at the 2026 Asian Games in Nagoya was held on 27 September 2026 at the Aichi Prefectural Martial Arts Hall.

Uzbekistan's Ibodatkhon Agojonova defeated Chinese Taipei's Lee Wan-ting in the final to win the gold medal. Lee took silver, while Natsumi Kuroki of Japan and Wang Pin-chun of Chinese Taipei shared the bronze medals.

== Schedule ==
All times are Japan Standard Time (UTC+09:00)

Date	Time	Event
Sunday, 27 September 2026	10:00	Round of 32
Sunday, 27 September 2026	10:00	Round of 16
Sunday, 27 September 2026	10:00	Quarterfinals
Sunday, 27 September 2026	14:00	Semifinals
Sunday, 27 September 2026	14:00	Final

== Results ==
=== Final ===
Final
Lee Wan-ting (TPE)	000
Ibodatkhon Agojonova (UZB)	001

=== Top half ===
Round of 32
Myrina Ladjahasan (PHI)	000
Humaý Jumadurdyýewa (TKM)	004
Sangita (IND)	000
Charmea Quelino (PHI)	111
Lee Wan-ting (TPE)	111
Chanyanuch Mathitano (THA)	000

Round of 16
Wang Pin-chun (TPE)	013
Humaý Jumadurdyýewa (TKM)	001
Tahereh Azarpeivand (IRI)	001
Bharti (IND)	000
Pardis Eidivandi (IRI)	001
Charmea Quelino (PHI)	011
Lee Wan-ting (TPE)	010
Shohida Qalandarova (TJK)	001

Quarterfinals
Wang Pin-chun (TPE)	010
Tahereh Azarpeivand (IRI)	001
Charmea Quelino (PHI)	000
Lee Wan-ting (TPE)	002

Semifinals
Wang Pin-chun (TPE)	000
Lee Wan-ting (TPE)	102

=== Bottom half ===
Round of 32
Begai Beishenaaly Kyzy (KGZ)	001
Rauza Nurmakhammetova (KAZ)	002
Fotima Kodirova (UZB)	012
Phạm Nguyễn Hồng Mơ (VIE)	001

Round of 16
Ibodatkhon Agojonova (UZB)	002
Rauza Nurmakhammetova (KAZ)	001
Karen Demura (JPN)	001
Nguyễn Thị Hường (VIE)	000
Aigerim Adaminova (KGZ)	000
Natsumi Kuroki (JPN)	100
Fotima Kodirova (UZB)	003
Zarina Saripova (KAZ)	001

Quarterfinals
Ibodatkhon Agojonova (UZB)	012
Karen Demura (JPN)	000
Natsumi Kuroki (JPN)	012
Fotima Kodirova (UZB)	001

Semifinals
Ibodatkhon Agojonova (UZB)	111
Natsumi Kuroki (JPN)	000
