= Kurash at the 2026 Asian Games – Men's 81 kg =

Men's 81 kg at the 2026 Asian Games
- Venue: Aichi Budokan
- Dates: 28 September 2026
- Competitors: 12 from 11 nations

Medalists
gold medal	Akhror Ziyodullaev	Uzbekistan
silver medal	Ramin Ahmadzadeh	Iran
bronze medal	Adilet Akhmetgali	Kazakhstan
bronze medal	Ken Oyoshi	Japan

The men's 81 kilograms Kurash competition at the 2026 Asian Games in Nagoya was held on 28 September 2026 at the Aichi Prefectural Martial Arts Hall.

Uzbekistan's Akhror Ziyodullaev defeated Iran's Ramin Ahmadzadeh in the final to win the gold medal. Ahmadzadeh took silver, while Adilet Akhmetgali of Kazakhstan and Ken Oyoshi of Japan shared the bronze medals.

== Schedule ==
All times are Japan Standard Time (UTC+09:00)

Date	Time	Event
Monday, 28 September 2026	09:40	Round of 16
Monday, 28 September 2026	09:40	Quarterfinals
Monday, 28 September 2026	14:00	Semifinals
Monday, 28 September 2026	14:00	Final

== Results ==
Round of 16
Czar Augustus Bayas (PHI)	000
Zabihullah Ehsani (AFG)	102
Majd Haj Kadoor (SYR)	000
Sung Hsiao-chung (TPE)	111
Ramin Ahmadzadeh (IRI)	101
Rattanan Kaunsatan (THA)	000
Ken Oyoshi (JPN)	102
Khürelbaataryn Khatanbold (MGL)	000

Quarterfinals
Akhror Ziyodullaev (UZB)	101
Zabihullah Ehsani (AFG)	000
Sung Hsiao-chung (TPE)	000
Adilet Akhmetgali (KAZ)	101
Ahmet Çaryýew (TKM)	000
Ramin Ahmadzadeh (IRI)	101
Ken Oyoshi (JPN)	101
Reza Ahmadzadeh (IRI)	000

Semifinals
Akhror Ziyodullaev (UZB)	110
Adilet Akhmetgali (KAZ)	001
Ramin Ahmadzadeh (IRI)	011
Ken Oyoshi (JPN)	002

Final
Akhror Ziyodullaev (UZB)	002
Ramin Ahmadzadeh (IRI)	001
