= Kurash at the 2026 Asian Games – Men's +90 kg =

Men's +90 kg at the 2026 Asian Games
- Venue: Aichi Budokan
- Dates: 27 September 2026
- Competitors: 11 from 8 nations

Medalists
gold medal	Shokhrukhkhon Bakhtiyorov	Uzbekistan
silver medal	Shakarmamad Mirmamadov	Tajikistan
bronze medal	Bekmurod Oltiboev	Uzbekistan
bronze medal	Kunathip Yea-on	Thailand

The men's +90 kilograms Kurash competition at the 2026 Asian Games in Nagoya was held on 27 September 2026 at the Aichi Prefectural Martial Arts Hall.

Uzbekistan's Shokhrukhkhon Bakhtiyorov defeated Tajikistan's Shakarmamad Mirmamadov in the final to win the gold medal. Mirmamadov took silver, while Bekmurod Oltiboev of Uzbekistan and Kunathip Yea-on of Thailand shared the bronze medals.

== Schedule ==
All times are Japan Standard Time (UTC+09:00)

Date	Time	Event
Sunday, 27 September 2026	10:00	Round of 16
Sunday, 27 September 2026	10:00	Quarterfinals
Sunday, 27 September 2026	14:00	Semifinals
Sunday, 27 September 2026	14:00	Final

== Results ==
Round of 16
Ölziibayaryn Düürenbayar (MGL)	110
Rasul Magomedov (BRN)	002
Baek Du-san (KOR)	001
Kunathip Yea-on (THA)	011
Yash Kumar Chauhan (IND)	000
Shakarmamad Mirmamadov (TJK)	110

Quarterfinals
Bekmurod Oltiboev (UZB)	101
Ölziibayaryn Düürenbayar (MGL)	000
Aaron Ng (SGP)	000
Shokhrukhkhon Bakhtiyorov (UZB)	110
Vishal (IND)	001
Kunathip Yea-on (THA)	011
Shakarmamad Mirmamadov (TJK)	012
Jeong Jun-yong (KOR)	000

Semifinals
Bekmurod Oltiboev (UZB)	001
Shokhrukhkhon Bakhtiyorov (UZB)	002
Kunathip Yea-on (THA)	001
Shakarmamad Mirmamadov (TJK)	100

Final
Shokhrukhkhon Bakhtiyorov (UZB)	010
Shakarmamad Mirmamadov (TJK)	001
