= Kurash at the 2026 Asian Games – Women's +87 kg =

Women's +87 kg at the 2026 Asian Games
- Venue: Aichi Budokan
- Dates: 29 September 2026
- Competitors: 12 from 7 nations

Medalists
gold medal	Kim Min-young	South Korea
silver medal	Shih Liu Li-ling	Chinese Taipei
bronze medal	Fatemeh Barmaki	Iran
bronze medal	Arailym Shegenova	Kazakhstan

The women's +87 kilograms Kurash competition at the 2026 Asian Games in Nagoya was held on 29 September 2026 at the Aichi Prefectural Martial Arts Hall.

South Korea's Kim Min-young defeated Chinese Taipei's Shih Liu Li-ling in the final to win the country's first-ever Kurash gold at the Asian Games. Shih took silver, while Fatemeh Barmaki of Iran and Arailym Shegenova of Kazakhstan shared the bronze medals.

== Schedule ==
All times are Japan Standard Time (UTC+09:00)

Date	Time	Event
Tuesday, 29 September 2026	09:30	Round of 16
Tuesday, 29 September 2026	09:30	Quarterfinals
Tuesday, 29 September 2026	14:00	Semifinals
Tuesday, 29 September 2026	14:00	Final

== Results ==
Round of 16
Yang Ya-chun (TPE)	111
Waraporn Suwanpairat (THA)	000
Maryam Peimani (IRI)	001
Ganboldyn Gegeen (MGL)	013
Dương Thanh Thanh (VIE)	001
Arailym Shegenova (KAZ)	011
Kim Min-young (KOR)	102
Trần Thị Thanh Thủy (VIE)	001

Quarterfinals
Fatemeh Barmaki (IRI)	002
Yang Ya-chun (TPE)	000
Ganboldyn Gegeen (MGL)	001
Shih Liu Li-ling (TPE)	002
Park Jong-won (KOR)	000
Arailym Shegenova (KAZ)	002
Kim Min-young (KOR)	100
Albina Bakhiyeva (KAZ)	000

Semifinals
Fatemeh Barmaki (IRI)	001
Shih Liu Li-ling (TPE)	010
Arailym Shegenova (KAZ)	001
Kim Min-young (KOR)	001

Final
Shih Liu Li-ling (TPE)	001
Kim Min-young (KOR)	011
