= Kurash at the 2026 Asian Games – Men's 66 kg =

Men's 66 kg at the 2026 Asian Games
- Venue: Aichi Budokan
- Dates: 29 September 2026
- Competitors: 18 from 11 nations

Medalists
gold medal	Majid Vahid	Iran
silver medal	Yosin Bobokalonov	Tajikistan
bronze medal	Kubanychbek Aibek Uulu	Kyrgyzstan
bronze medal	Sarvar Abdushukurov	Tajikistan

The men's 66 kilograms Kurash competition at the 2026 Asian Games in Nagoya was held on 29 September 2026 at the Aichi Prefectural Martial Arts Hall.

Iran's Majid Vahid defeated Tajikistan's Yosin Bobokalonov in the final to win Iran`s first gold medal in this edition of Kurash at the Asian Games.

== Schedule ==
All times are Japan Standard Time (UTC+09:00)

Date	Time	Event
Tuesday, 29 September 2026	09:30	Round of 32
Tuesday, 29 September 2026	09:30	Round of 16
Tuesday, 29 September 2026	09:30	Quarterfinals
Tuesday, 29 September 2026	14:00	Semifinals
Tuesday, 29 September 2026	14:00	Final

== Results ==
=== Final ===
Final
Majid Vahid (IRI)	010
Yosin Bobokalonov (TJK)	010

=== Top half ===
Round of 32
Nick Gabriel Ligero (PHI)	000
Yoon Hyeon-su (KOR)	101

Round of 16
Vipin Kumar (IND)	001
Yoon Hyeon-su (KOR)	002
Merajuddin Chakmar (AFG)	001
Kubanychbek Aibek Uulu (KGZ)	002
Majid Vahid (IRI)	011
Islam Kamchybekov (KGZ)	001
Rahimullah Najmi (AFG)	110
Jackielou Escarpe (PHI)	000

Quarterfinals
Yoon Hyeon-su (KOR)	001
Kubanychbek Aibek Uulu (KGZ)	102
Majid Vahid (IRI)	100
Rahimullah Najmi (AFG)	000

Semifinals
Kubanychbek Aibek Uulu (KGZ)	000
Majid Vahid (IRI)	001

=== Bottom half ===
Round of 32
Yosin Bobokalonov (TJK)	010
Nur Amanshukirov (KAZ)	001

Round of 16
Sarvar Abdushukurov (TJK)	010
Ylýas Muhammedow (TKM)	000
Bolat Bilal (KAZ)	103
Chan Hao-cheng (TPE)	000
Pan Ssu-cheng (TPE)	000
Hydyr Muhammedow (TKM)	001
Yosin Bobokalonov (TJK)	102
Isamu Watanabe (JPN)	001

Quarterfinals
Sarvar Abdushukurov (TJK)	011
Bolat Bilal (KAZ)	002
Hydyr Muhammedow (TKM)	000
Yosin Bobokalonov (TJK)	011

Semifinals
Sarvar Abdushukurov (TJK)	000
Yosin Bobokalonov (TJK)	002
