= Samuel Marbun =

Indonesian wushu practitioner

Personal information
- Nationality: Indonesian
- Born: 4 October 1998 (age 28) Sihikkit, North Sumatra
- Height: 1.71 m (5 ft 7 in)

Sport
- Country: Indonesia
- Sport: Wushu
Medal record
Men's wushu sanda
Representing Indonesia
World Championships
Bronze medal – third place	2023 Fort Worth	65 kg
Asian Games
Silver medal – second place	2022 Hangzhou	65 kg
SEA Games
Gold medal – first place	2025 Thailand	65 kg
Silver medal – second place	2023 Cambodia	65 kg

Samuel Marbun (born 4 October 1998) is an Indonesian wushu practitioner from Sihikkit, North Sumatra. He won silver at the 2022 Asian Games in Hangzhou and Silver at the 2023 SEA Games in Phnom Penh in the men's sanda 65 kg category.
