= Kapil Pokhariya =

Indian boxer (born 2000)

Personal information
- National team: India
- Citizenship: India
- Born: 28 July 2000 (age 26) Uttarakhand

Sport
- Country: India
- Sport: Boxing
- Weight class: 90kg

Kapil Pokhariya (born 28 July 2000) is an Indian amateur boxer from Uttarakhand, who competes in the 90 kg division. He won a bronze meda for India in the 90 kg division at the 2026 Asian Games at Nagoya, Aichi Prefecture, Japan held from 19 September to 4 October 2026.

== Early life ==
Pokhariya is from Chakarpur village, Udham Singh Nagar district, Uttarakhand. He is a product of Gohana Boxing Club in Sonipat, Haryana. He was selected for the Inspire Institute of Sport (IIS) programme in Bellary, Karnataka and trained here for both Commonwealth and Asian Games 2026.

== Career ==
Pokhariya started boxing in 2016 after a friend introduced him to the sport. He won a gold medal at the National Games in 2025.

He represented India at the Commonwealth Games 2026 in the 90 kg division at Glasgow. After getting a bye, he lost his first bout in the quarterfinals and finished 5th. Earlier, he won a silver medal at the Grand Prix Usti nad Labem 2026.
