= Vikrant Baliyan =

India mixed martial arts fighter

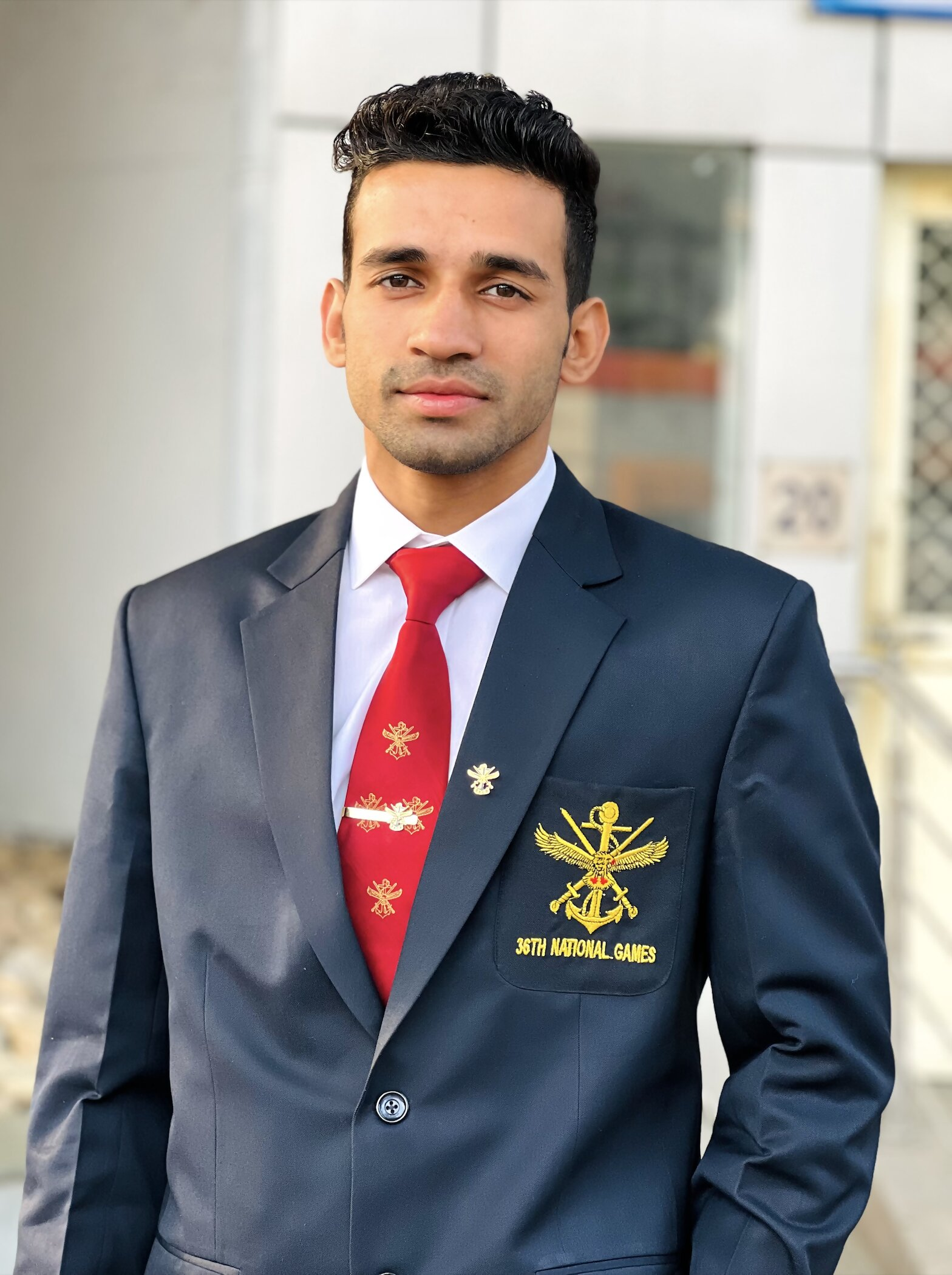

Personal information
- Full name: Vikrant Baliyan
- National team: India
- Citizenship: Indian
- Born: Meerut, Uttar Pradesh, India
- Home town: Meerut
- Occupations: Wushu athlete, Boxer

Sport
- Country: India
- Sport: Wushu
- Event: Sanda
Medal record
Men's Sanda
Representing India
World Wushu Championships
Bronze medal – third place	2019 Shanghai	60 kg
South Asian Games
Gold medal – first place	2019 Nepal	60 kg

Vikrant Baliyan is an Indian sanda fighter. He earned bronze medal in men's Sanda 60 kg at the 2019 World Wushu Championships in Shanghai, China, and gold medal in men's Sanda 60 kg at the 2019 South Asian Games in Pokhra, Nepal. Won Gold Medal in 9th Junior Asian Wushu Championship held from 14 September to 21 September 2017

India's Minister of Youth Affairs and Sports Kiren Rijiju Wushu World Championships medal winners World Wushu Championship 2019 in Shanghai. Vikrant Baliyan was also included.

== See also ==
- 2019 World Wushu Championships
