= Liu Shi =

Liu Shi or Liushi may refer to:

== People ==
- Emperor Yuan of Han (75–33 BC), given name Liu Shi, emperor of the Han dynasty
- Liu Shi (Tang dynasty) (died 659), grand councilor of the Tang dynasty
- Liu Rushi or Liu Shi (1618–1664), Ming dynasty female artist and poet

== Places in China ==
- Liushi Shan, mountain in the Kunlun Mountain Range, between Tibet and Xinjiang in western China
- Liushi Township (六市乡), a township in Lianhua County, Jiangxi
- Liushi Subdistrict, Liuzhou (柳石街道), a subdistrict of Liunan District, Liuzhou, Guangxi
- Liushi Subdistrict, Dongyang (六石街道), a subdistrict of Dongyang, Zhejiang

=== Towns ===
- Liushi, Hebei (留史), in Li County, Hebei
- Liushi, Hunan (硫市), in Hengnan County, Hunan
- Liushi, Yueqing (柳市), in Yueqing, Zhejiang

== Others ==
- Lapse of Time, a 1982 Chinese novella by Wang Anyi

== See also ==
- Lady Liu (disambiguation), notable women surnamed Liu in ancient and imperial China
- Liu Zhi (ROC) (1892–1971), Chinese Kuomintang general and politician, sometimes romanized as "Liu Shi"
