= 2022 Asian Games =

Multi-sport event in Hangzhou, China

XIX Asian Games
- Host city: Hangzhou, China
- Motto: Heart to Heart, @Future (Chinese: 心心相融，@未来)
- Nations: 45
- Athletes: 11,909
- Events: 481 in 40 sports (61 disciplines)
- Opening: 23 September 2023
- Closing: 8 October 2023
- Opened by: Xi Jinping; President of China (Note: Xi Jinping is China's de jure state representative, serving as President of China. Xi is also the General Secretary of the Communist Party, the most powerful position in China, serving as the top leader.)
- Closed by: Randhir Singh; President of the Olympic Council of Asia
- Athlete's Oath: Zheng Siwei; Sun Yingsha
- Torch lighter: Wang Shun
- Main venue: Hangzhou Sports Park Stadium
- Website: www.hangzhou2022.cn/En/

Summer

Winter

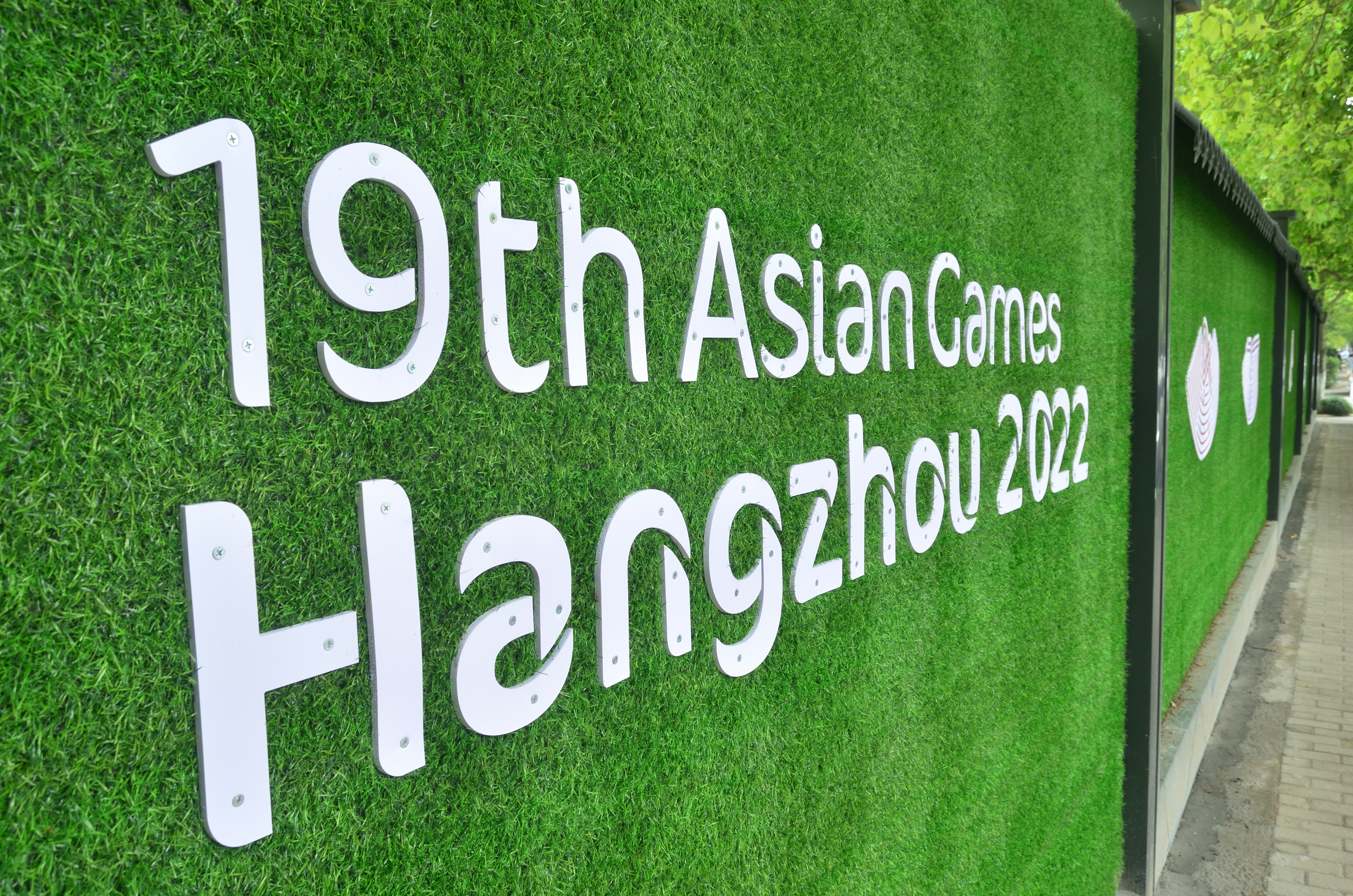
Hangzhou 19th Asian Games sign in Hangzhou

The 2022 Asian Games (2022年亚洲运动会; 2022 nián yàzhōu yùndònghuì), officially the XIX Asian Games (第十九届亚洲运动会; Dì shíjiǔ jiè yàzhōu yùndònghuì) and also known as Hangzhou 2022 (杭州2022), were a continental multi-sport event which was held from 23 September to 8 October 2023 in Hangzhou, China. The games marked the 110th anniversary since the creation of the first continental event, starting with the 1913 Far Eastern Championship Games.

Originally scheduled to take place from 10 to 25 September 2022, on 6 May 2022 the Games were postponed to 2023 due to the COVID-19 pandemic. The new dates were announced on 19 July 2022, with the Games remaining branded as Hangzhou 2022. Hangzhou was the third Chinese city to host the Asian Games, after Beijing in 1990 and Guangzhou in 2010.

== Bidding process ==
The Chinese Olympic Committee confirmed that Hangzhou in Zhejiang province submitted a proposal to apply for the event and was the only city to complete all necessary steps to participate in the process who ended on end of August 2015. Hangzhou was officially awarded as the host city on 16 September 2015 in Ashgabat, Turkmenistan, during the 34th OCA General Assembly.

== Development and preparations ==
=== Marketing ===
==== Emblem ====
The emblem of the Games, "Surging Tides" (Chinese: 潮涌; pinyin: Cháoyǒng), was unveiled during a ceremony at the headquarters of the Hangzhou Culture Radio Television Group on 6 August 2018; it is designed to resemble a traditional hand fan from Zheijang, a running track, the Qiantang River tidal bore, and radio waves (symbolising wireless connectivity). The organising committee stated that the emblem was meant to reflect "the great cause of socialism with Chinese characteristics gathering momentum in the new era", and "the unity, solidarity and development of the OCA."

==== Mascots ====
The mascots of the games, known collectively as the "Memories of Jiangnan"

The three mascots of the Games, Congcong (琮琮), Lianlian (莲莲) and Chenchen (宸宸), known collectively as the "Memories of Jiangnan" (Chinese: 江南忆; pinyin: Jiāngnán yì, Jiangnan refers to roughly China's eastern regions south of the Yangtze River) whose name derives from the Tang Dynasty poet Bai Juyi's famous sentence "When I recall Jiangnan, Hangzhou brings back most of my memories." (Chinese: 江南忆，最忆是杭州; pinyin: Jiāngnán yì, zuì yì shì hángzhōu) were unveiled on 3 April 2020. They are depicted as robotic superheroes originating from the Archaeological Ruins of Liangzhu City, the West Lake and the Grand Canal respectively.

Congcong derives its name from the Cong jade pendant unearthed from the Archeological Ruins. Its body is coloured yellow, representing earth and bumper harvest and its head resembles mythical beast facial patterns. It is described as determined, sincere, kind-hearted, athletic and passionate.

Lianlian derives its name from the lotus leaves in the West Lake. Its body is coloured green, representing life and nature and its head resembles lotus leaf decorated with the Three Pools Mirroring the Moon, a scenic view of the West Lake, and the icon of Internet. It is described as pure, kind, lively, cute, elegant and hospitable.

Chenchen derives its name from the Gongchen Bridge, a landmark structure in the Hangzhou section of the Grand Canal. Its body is coloured blue, representing science and technology and its head resembles Qiantang River's tide with Gongchen Bridge. It is described as brave, intelligent, optimistic and enterprising.

==== Motto ====
The official motto of the 2022 Asian Games, "Heart to Heart, @Future" was announced on 15 December 2019 to mark 1,000 days before the opening ceremonies. The motto is intended to symbolise the connectivity that the Asian Games create between the countries of Asia.

==== Medals ====
On 15 June 2023, the 100-day countdown to the 19th Asian Games, the medal design named "Shan Shui" (Chinese: 湖山; pinyin: Húshān) was released. Its design was inspired by Jade Cong in the Liangzhu Culture. The obverse featured the Games edition logo, misty hills, the city, a rippling lake and undulating mountains, while the reverse featured the Asian Games Sun Emblem and the name of the event in Chinese and English.

During the medal ceremonies, medalists were also presented bouquets named "Fruits of Triumph" (Chinese: 硕果累累; pinyin: Shuòguǒ lěilěi), which consisted of five flowers – rice ears, lotus seedpods, moth orchids (Phalaenopsis), Longjing tea branches and sweet osmanthus branches arranged in a vase inspired by a huagu, a long-stemmed, broad-lipped vessel produced in the Southern Song (1127-1279) Imperial Kiln. The vase itself is made of wood and crafted using Dongyang wood carving techniques, one of the nation's intangible cultural heritage. Its mouth is decorated with wave patterns resembling rivers and mountains of Zhejiang Province and the Games' mascots.

==== Music ====
The official theme song of the Games, "With You and Me", was released along with its music video on April 27, 2023. It is performed by Angela Zhang, Jackson Wang, Sunnee and JC-T. The song was selected through a global song contest and was originally created by a production team from Thailand, Nadao Music. The original title of the song is "Let's Celebrate" or "เพื่อนกัน (Puean Kan)" in Thai and was sung by Ice Paris, Billkin, PP Krit and Nana Sawanya.

==== Asian Games-themed train ====
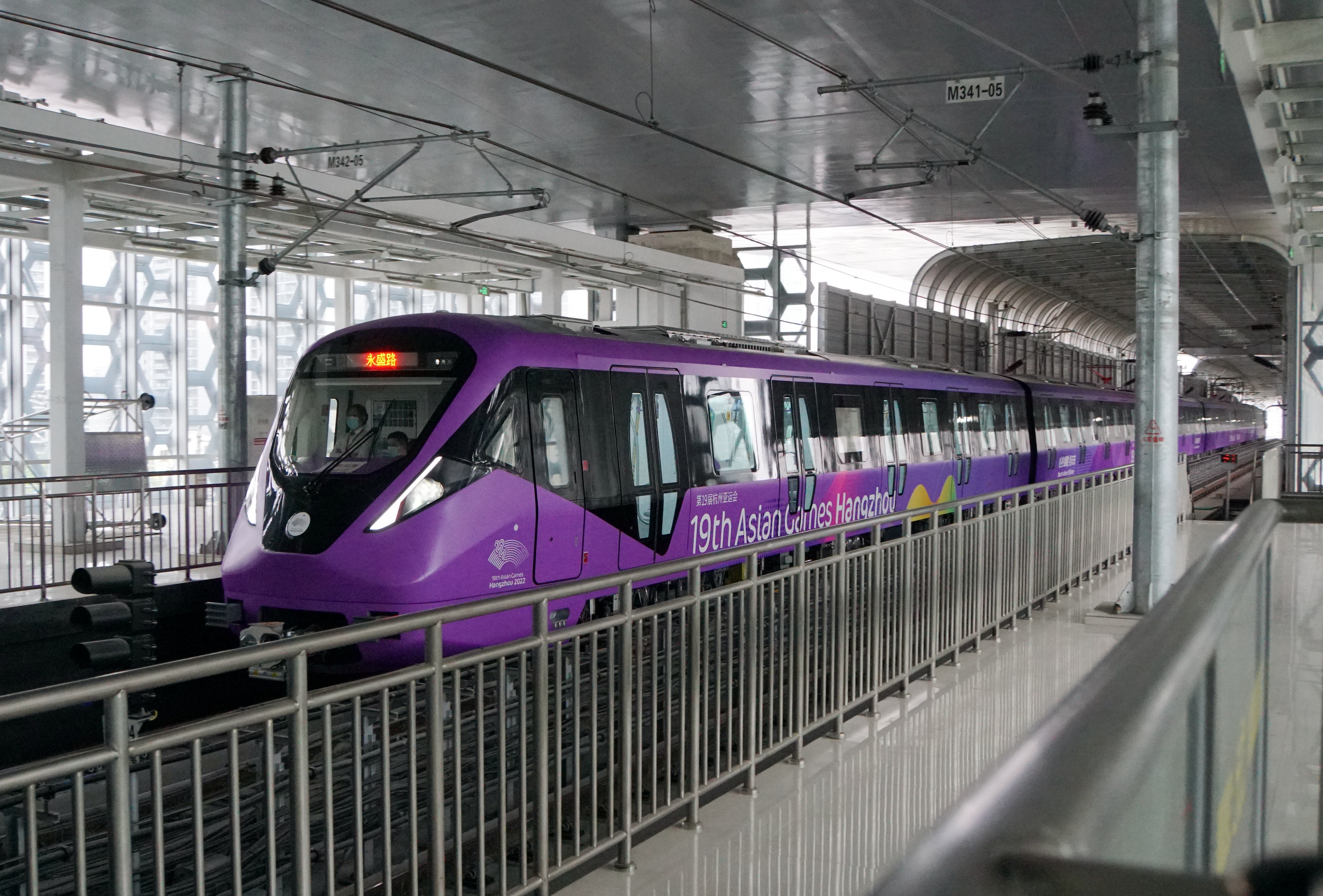
The Asian Games-themed train in Hangzhou Metro Line 19

On 16 May 2023, the train number 19045 of Hangzhou Metro Line 19 named Asian Games (Chinese: 亚运号; pinyin: Yàyùn hào) started operation. The train displays the Hangzhou Asian Games Logo at the front of the train, and the whole train as well as seats and handrails are colored in purple. This is also the only train in this line that provides OLED start train window system. These Asian Games elements are permanent. Besides, in Hangzhou Metro, Line 1, Line 2, Line 4 and Line 5 will also provide Asian Games-themed trains.

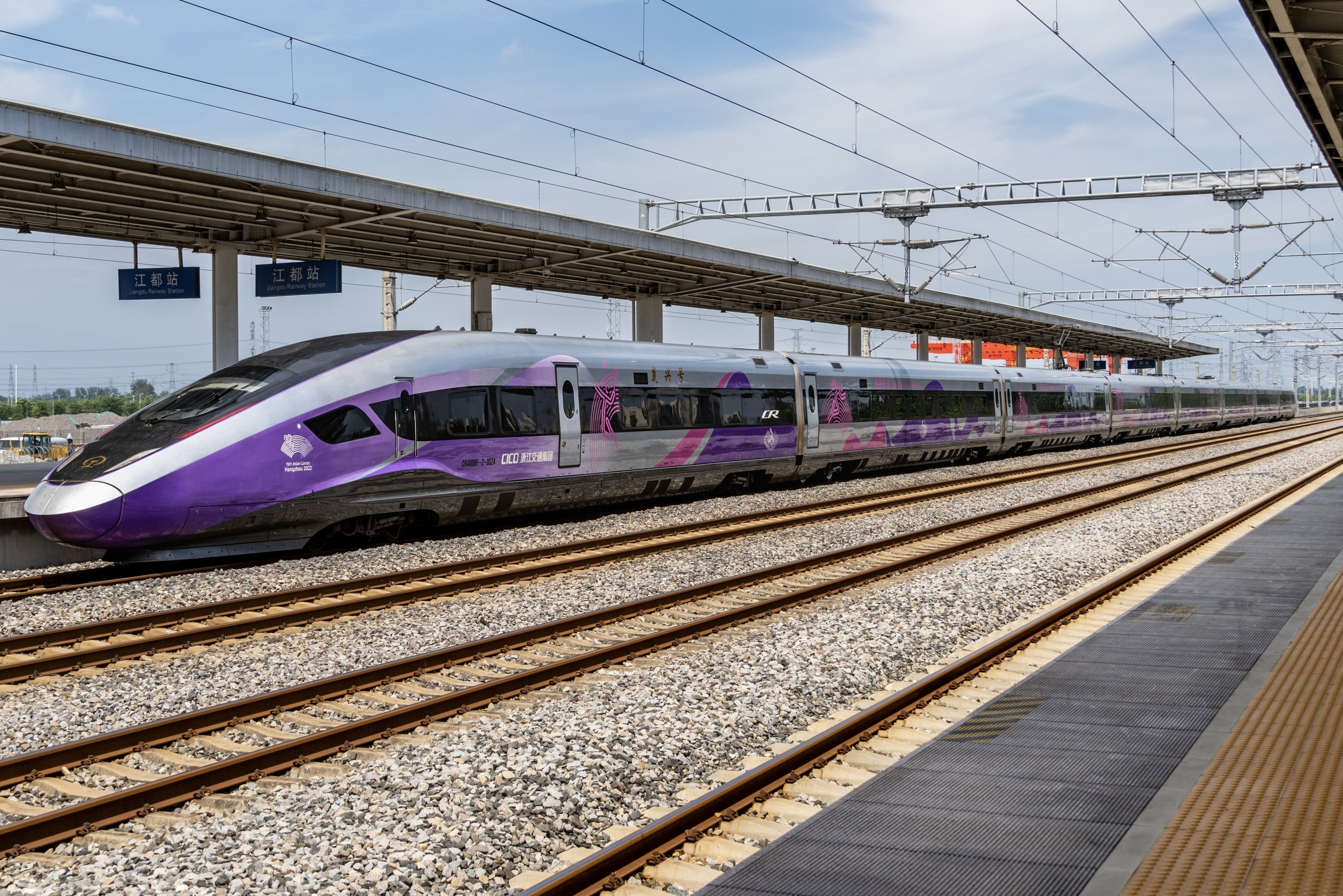
Asian Games-themed Fuxing train

In July 2023, the Asian Games-themed Fuxing train came into appearance. The train is themed Runze Jiangnan (Chinese: 润泽江南), using the purple as main color, painting slogans, motto and logos of Hangzhou Asian Games. During the Asian Games, the train will provide operation services between Hangzhou and Ningbo, Wenzhou, Jinhua, Shaoxing and Huzhou.

On 1 August 2023, the "Jincai" Asian Games themed train of Jinhua Rail Transit started at Jinhua Railway Station.

On 26 August 2023, the Asian Games train of Wenzhou Rail Transit Line S1 started operation, which is in purple as the main color, with Asian Games elements including mottos and slogans.

==== Look of the Games ====
On 21 October 2020, the core graphics and colour system were announced as part of the 2022 Asian Games branding, respectively themed as "Meeting the World" (Chinese: 润泽; pinyin: Rùnzé) and "Harmony of Colours" (Chinese: 淡妆浓抹; pinyin: Dànzhuāng nóng mǒ). The core graphics draw inspiration from silk, one of the main cultural elements of Hangzhou as key linking point on the Maritime Silk Road. The colour system consists of six colours – "Rainbow Purple", "Glowing Red", "Mist White", "Laurus Yellow", "Glimmering Blue", and "Lake-and-Mountain Green", which represent Hangzhou as a livable city of pellucid waters and lush mountains, and a vibrant city embracing innovation and sports. It is inspired by lines from one of China's most famous poet Su Shi from Song dynasty, "If the West Lake was the Great Beauty, she would look beautiful whether in light or heavy make-up" (Chinese: 欲把西湖比西子，淡妆浓抹总相宜; pinyin: Yù bǎ xīhú bǐ xī zi, dànzhuāng nóng mǒ zǒng xiāngyí).

=== Torch relay ===
On 10 September 2021, the final torch design of the 2022 Asian Games called "Eternal Flame" (Chinese: 薪火; pinyin: Xīn huǒ) was unveiled. It has an overall height of 730 millimetres and a net weight of 1.2 kilograms. The torch base resembles eight water veins, which symbolising the evolution of civilisation and representing the eight major river systems in Zhejiang, the torch body features naturally intertwined dermatoglyphic fingerprint patterns specific to the Liangzhu Culture, the torch head resembles Jade Cong, while the burner nozzle resembles the earliest oracle bone inscription of the Chinese character "琮" (Cong). The overall body design made up of profile curve resembles firewood in hand.

The flame was lit in the Archaeological site of Liangzhu on 15 June 2023 and reproduced their rites. The physical torch relay started on 8 September 2023 at West Lake, and traveled across 11 prefectures covering 1.507,10 km across Zhejiang province. A digital torch relay programme, the first of its kind in the history of the Games, was launched globally on 27 November 2022 and began the same day as the actual torch relay.

=== Venues ===
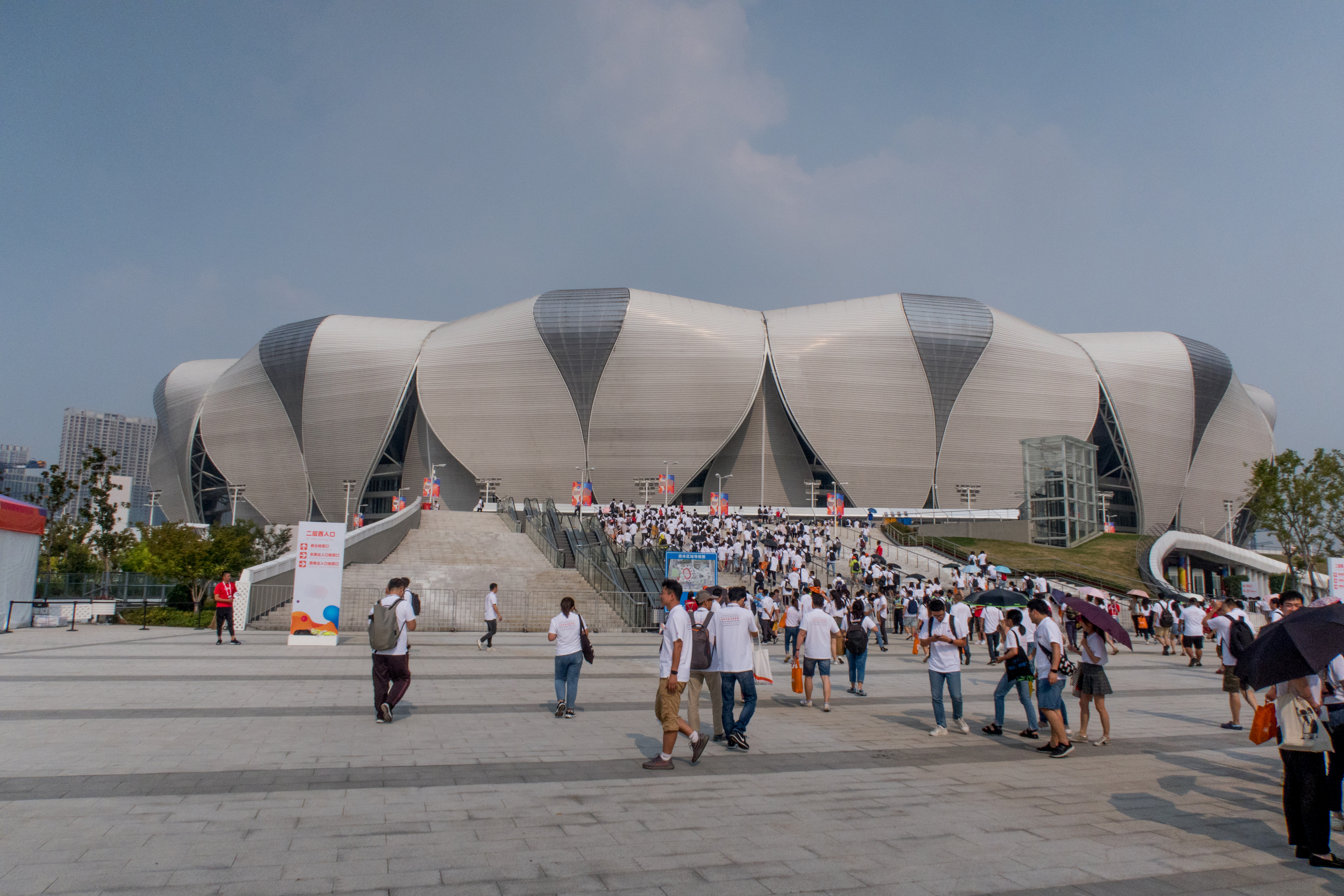
Hangzhou Olympic Sports Expo Center

44 venues were used for the Games, including 30 existing facilities and 14 newly constructed venues. Of these 44 venues, 30 are within Hangzhou and its districts, while other 14 are in four neighbouring prefectures: Deqing, Jinhua, Ningbo, Shaoxing and Wenzhou. A new high-speed rail line was constructed between Hangzhou and Huzhou for the Games.

== Ceremonies ==
=== Opening ceremony ===
The opening ceremony was held on 23 September 2023 evening in Hangzhou Sports Park Stadium in Hangzhou, China. The ceremony was directed by Sha Xiaolan, one of assistant directors of the opening and closing ceremonies of the 2022 Winter Olympics in Beijing. It was attended by the Chinese leader Xi Jinping, some Asian foreign leaders including Syrian President Bashar al-Assad, and the President of the International Olympic Committee, Thomas Bach.

=== Closing ceremony ===
The closing ceremony was held on 8 October 2023 in Hangzhou Sports Park Stadium; it included a cultural presentation, closing remarks, and the formal handover to Aichi Prefecture, in Japan as hosts of next edition in 2026.

== The Games ==
=== Sports ===
On 8 April 2019, the Olympic Council of Asia initially announced that the Games would feature 37 sports, including the 28 "core" Olympic sports that would contested at the 2024 Summer Olympics in Paris, as well as events in other non-Olympic sports. This led to the addition and change in events such as marathon swimming and the groups competition in rhythmic gymnastics in place of the team event.

On 12 September 2019, baseball/softball, karate, and sport climbing (which were optional events at the then-upcoming 2020 Summer Olympics) were added to the programme. On 18 December 2020, it was announced that esports (which was held as a demonstration event in 2018) and breakdancing (which would debut at the 2024 Summer Olympics) would be added, expanding the Games to 61 disciplines in 40 sports.

The esports programme at the 2022 Asian Games included seven medal events and two demonstration events in robotics and virtual reality. Competitions were held in Arena of Valor, Dota 2, Dream of the Three Kingdoms 2, EA Sports FC Online, League of Legends, PUBG Mobile, and Street Fighter V. Hearthstone was originally to be included, but was dropped from the programme after NetEase ended its licensing agreement in China with Blizzard Entertainment at the beginning of 2023.

Changes at the sporting events compared to 2018:

- Five sports were removed after their allocation to other Olympic Council of Asia events: Bowling (6), Jet ski (4), Paragliding (6), Pencak silat (16), Sambo (4).

Due to an internal decision by the OCA, the following 6 sports have been added to the program: Marathon swimming (2), Breakdancing (2), Chess (4), Esports (7), Go (3), Xiangqi (3).

- Another 6 sports had a change in the number of events: Mountain biking (2), Track cycling (2), Bridge (3), Rowing (The 10 Olympic events returned with the addition of 4 more at the request of the organizers) (1), Taekwondo (1), Weightlifting (1).
- 11 Sports with added events (39): Archery (2), Boxing (3), Dragon boat (1), Karate (2), Modern pentathlon (2), Roller sports (8), Sailing (4), Shooting (13), Squash (1), Table tennis (2), Wushu (1).
- 3 Sports with change in number of events: Kurash reduced from 14 to 7 finals, Canoe Sprint increased from 10 to 12 finals and the Mixed Team Speed Relay was added in place of the each gender relay.
- Athletics: Mixed team 35 kilometres race walk was added and Men's 50 kilometres walk removed.

61 Sport disciplines divided to 4 groups:

1. Competitive sports (24): Esports, Archery, Breaking, Athletics, Triathlon, Equestrian, Modern Penthathlon, Cycling Road, Cycling Track, Cycling MTB, Cycling BMX Racing, Weightlifting, Gymnastics TP, Gymnastics RH, Gymnastics AR, Xiangqi, Chess, Bridge, Go, Shooting, Skateboarding, Roller Skating, Wushu, Sport Climbing.
2. Ball sports (18): Football, Basketball 5-5, Basketball 3-3, Indoor Volleyball, Beach Volleyball, Handball, Badminton, Table Tennis, Softball, Hockey, Golf, Hard Tennis, Soft Tennis, Squash, Sepaktakraw, Cricket, Baseball, Rugby Sevens.
3. Adversary sports (9): Boxing, Taekwondo, Wrestling, Judo, Ju-jitsu, Kurash, Fencing, Kabaddi, Karate.
4. Water sports (10): Water Polo, Dragon Boat, Canoe Slalom, Canoe Sprint, Rowing, Sailing, Diving, Artistic Swimming, Marathon Swimming, Swimming.

2022 Asian Games Sports Programme
- Aquatics
  - Artistic swimming
  - Diving
  - Marathon swimming
  - Swimming
  - Water polo
- Archery
- Athletics
- Badminton
- Baseball
  - Baseball
  - Softball
- Basketball
  - Basketball
  - 3×3 basketball
- Boxing
- Breakdancing
- Canoeing
  - Slalom
  - Sprint
- Cricket
- Cycling
  - BMX
  - Mountain bike
  - Road
  - Track
- Dragon boat
- Equestrian
- Fencing
- Field hockey
- Football
- Golf
- Gymnastics
  - Artistic
  - Rhythmic
  - Trampoline
- Handball
- Judo
- Kabaddi
- Martial arts
  - Ju-jitsu
  - Karate
  - Kurash
- Mind sports
  - Bridge
  - Chess
  - Esports
  - Go
  - Xiangqi
- Modern pentathlon
- Roller sports
  - Roller skating
  - Skateboarding
- Rowing
- Rugby sevens
- Sailing
- Sepak takraw
- Shooting
- Sport climbing
- Squash
- Table tennis
- Taekwondo
- Tennis
  - Soft tennis
  - Tennis
- Triathlon
- Volleyball
  - Beach volleyball
  - Volleyball
- Weightlifting
- Wrestling
- Wushu

== Medal table ==
The top ten ranked NOCs at these Games are listed below.

* Host nation (China)

2022 Asian Games medal table
Rank	Nation	Gold	Silver	Bronze	Total
1	China*	201	111	71	383
2	Japan	52	67	69	188
3	South Korea	42	59	89	190
4	India	28	38	40	106
5	Uzbekistan	22	18	31	71
6	Chinese Taipei	19	20	28	67
7	Iran	13	21	20	54
8	Thailand	12	14	32	58
9	Bahrain	12	3	5	20
10	North Korea	11	18	10	39
11–41	Remaining NOCs	70	111	235	416
Totals (41 entries)		482	480	630	1,592

== Calendar ==
All times and dates use China Standard Time (UTC+8)

OC	Opening ceremony	●	Event competitions	1	Event finals	CC	Closing ceremony

Event/Date→		September 2023												October								Events
Event/Date→		19 Tue	20 Wed	21 Thu	22 Fri	23 Sat	24 Sun	25 Mon	26 Tue	27 Wed	28 Thu	29 Fri	30 Sat	1 Sun	2 Mon	3 Tue	4 Wed	5 Thu	6 Fri	7 Sat	8 Sun	Events
Ceremonies						OC															CC	
Aquatics
Aquatics	Artistic swimming																		●	1	1	2
Aquatics	Diving												2	2	2	2	2					10
Aquatics	Marathon swimming																		1	1		2
Aquatics	Swimming						7	7	6	7	7	7										41
Aquatics	Water polo							●	●	●	●	●	●	1	●	●	●	●	●	1		2
Archery														●	●	●	2	2	2	4		10
Athletics												5	7	8	8	10	8	2				48
Badminton											●	●	●	2	●	●	●	●	●	5		7
Baseball
Baseball	Baseball								●	●	●			●	●	●		●	●	1		1
Baseball	Softball								●	●	●	●	●		1							1
Basketball
Basketball	Basketball								●	●	●	●	●	●	●	●	●	1	1			2
Basketball	3×3 Basketball							●	●	●	●	●	●	2								2
Boxing							●	●	●	●	●	●	●	●		2	5	6				13
Breaking																			●	2		2
Canoeing
Canoeing	Slalom																	●	2	2		4
Canoeing	Sprint												●	●	6	6						12
Cricket		●	●	●	●		●	1		●	●	●		●	●	●	●		●	1		2
Cycling
Cycling	BMX													2								2
Cycling	Mountain biking							2														2
Cycling	Road cycling															2	1	1				4
Cycling	Track cycling								2	3	3	4										12
Dragon boat																	2	2	2			6
Equestrian									1	●	1		●	●	2		1		1			6
Fencing							2	2	2	2	2	2										12
Field hockey							●	●	●	●	●	●	●	●	●	●	●	●	1	1		2
Football		●	●	●	●		●	●		●	●		●	●		●	●		1	1		2
Golf											●	●	●	4								4
Gymnastics
Gymnastics	Artistic						1	1	1	1	5	5										14
Gymnastics	Rhythmic																		1	1		2
Gymnastics	Trampolining														1	1						2
Handball							●	●		●		●	●	●		●		2				2
Judo							4	5	5	1												15
Kabaddi															●	●	●	●	●	2		2
Martial arts
Martial arts	Ju-jitsu																	3	3	2		8
Martial arts	Karate																	4	4	4	2	14
Martial arts	Kurash												3	2	2							7
Mind sports
Mind sports	Bridge									●	●	●	●	●	●	●	●	●	3			3
Mind sports	Chess						●	●	●	2		●	●	●	●	●	●	●	●	2		4
Mind sports	Esports						●	●	1	1	1	1	1	1	1							7
Mind sports	Go						●	●	●	●	1	●	●	●	●	2						3
Mind sports	Xiangqi										●	●	●	1		●	●	●	●	2		3
Modern pentathlon			●		●		4															4
Roller sports
Roller sports	Roller skating												2	2	2		1	2	●	1		10
Roller sports	Skateboarding						●	2	●	2												4
Rowing			●	●	●		7	7														14
Rugby sevens							●	●	2													2
Sailing				●	●	●	●	●	●	14												14
Sepak takraw							●	●	●	●	●	2		●	●	●	2	●	●	2		6
Shooting							2	6	3	8	5	4	1	4								33
Sport climbing																2	2	●	1	1		6
Squash									●	●	●	●	2	●	●	●	●	3				5
Table tennis					●	●	●	●	2	●	●	●	1	2	2							7
Taekwondo							2	3	3	3	2											13
Tennis
Tennis	Tennis						●	●	●	●	●	2	3									5
Tennis	Soft tennis															●	2	1	●	2		5
Triathlon												1	1		1							3
Volleyball
Volleyball	Beach volleyball	●	●	●	●		●	●	●	1	1											2
Volleyball	Indoor volleyball	●	●	●	●		●	●	1				●	●	●		●	●	●	1		2
Weightlifting													2	2	2	1	1	2	2	2		14
Wrestling																	4	5	5	4		18
Wushu							2	2	2	2	7											15
Daily medal events							31	38	31	47	35	33	25	35	30	28	33	36	30	46	3	481
Cumulative total							31	69	100	147	182	215	240	275	305	333	366	402	432	478	481	481
Event/Date→		September 2023												October								Events
Event/Date→		19 Tue	20 Wed	21 Thu	22 Fri	23 Sat	24 Sun	25 Mon	26 Tue	27 Wed	28 Thu	29 Fri	30 Sat	1 Sun	2 Mon	3 Tue	4 Wed	5 Thu	6 Fri	7 Sat	8 Sun	Events

== Participation ==
All 45 National Olympic Committees who are members of the Olympic Council of Asia are expected to send delegations. In March 2019, the OCA announced plans to invite athletes from countries from Oceania to compete in selected events; this would mark their first participation in the Summer Asian Games, after having participated for the first time overall at the 2017 Asian Winter Games, albeit as "guests" ineligible to receive medals.

In November 2021, it was announced that athletes from Oceania would be invited to compete in athletics, triathlon, roller skating, weightlifting, and wushu. Athletes were to receive "honorary medals" which would not be counted on the official medal tally. The plan was shelved due to a lack of interest from the relevant federations in Australia and New Zealand.

On 26 January 2023, the OCA offered the possibility to Russian and Belarusian athletes to take part in the Asian Games, but athletes from the two nations should compete to qualify at the 2024 Summer Olympics. However, Russia and Belarus will still be under the sanctions placed by OCA, and is also in analysis whether their entries will or not impact the Asian Games' outcome.

On 8 July 2023, OCA permitted as many as 500 athletes from Russia and Belarus to compete under the neutral ground without affecting the medal tally, with the decision supported by the International Olympic Committee (IOC). However, Russian Olympic Committee President cast doubt about the participation of Russian and Belarusian athletes as invitation was not received. On 2 September, Russia and Belarus were confirmed not to participate in the 2022 Asian Games due to "technical reasons", claimed IOC.

Sri Lanka Rugby was suspended by the World Rugby Council due to alleged political interference, causing the Sri Lanka rugby team to be barred from competing under the Sri Lanka national flag and anthem. The team competed under the Olympic Council of Asia flag and anthem, using the country code "OCA". In official Games material, the team is listed separately from Sri Lanka, with the designation "Independent Athlete Participating Under OCA Flag" (in all caps) in place of a country name. The team opted out of the opening ceremony.

Afghanistan participated as the de jure Islamic Republic of Afghanistan. An all-male group of athletes arrived from within Afghanistan, while the extant Afghanistan NOC sent another group of athletes from three countries (Iran, Australia, and Italy) including 17 women.

Participating National Olympic Committees
- Afghanistan (83)
- Bahrain (143)
- Bangladesh (181)
- Bhutan (27)
- Brunei (11)
- Cambodia (133)
- China (887) (host)
- Hong Kong (688)
- Independent Athletes (12)
- India (655)
- Indonesia (415)
- Iran (289)
- Iraq (33)
- Japan (772)
- Jordan (78)
- Kazakhstan (527)
- Kuwait (140)
- Kyrgyzstan (181)
- Laos (94)
- Lebanon (29)
- Macau (183)
- Malaysia (289)
- Maldives (76)
- Mongolia (408)
- Myanmar (107)
- Nepal (253)
- North Korea (185)
- Oman (44)
- Pakistan (189)
- Palestine (70)
- Philippines (391)
- Qatar (231)
- Saudi Arabia (188)
- Singapore (431)
- South Korea (867)
- Sri Lanka (84)
- Syria (7)
- Chinese Taipei (524)
- Tajikistan (106)
- Thailand (934)
- Timor-Leste (27)
- Turkmenistan (57)
- United Arab Emirates (134)
- Uzbekistan (394)
- Vietnam (332)
- Yemen (20)

== Broadcasting ==
On 25 January 2022, during the first Games World Broadcasters Meeting held in the host city, Chinese state broadcaster China Media Group (CMG) undertook the role as the event's host broadcaster. The International Broadcast Centre would be constructed at the Hangzhou International Expo Centre.

=== Broadcasting rights ===
Country/region	Rights holder	Ref
Australia	SBS; SBS Viceland; SBS On Demand	
China	CMG; CCTV; CNR; Tencent; China Mobile Migu; Douyin; Kuaishou	
Hong Kong	HOY TV; RTHK (Note: Only aired both the Opening and Closing ceremonies)	
India	Culver Max Entertainment; Sony Sports Network; SonyLIV	
Indonesia	MNC Media; RCTI; MNCTV; iNews; MNC Vision; Sportstars; Sportstars 2; Soccer Channel; RCTI+; Vision+; TVRI Sport	
Japan	JNN; MBS; TBS; TVer; U-Next Sports	
Macau	TDM	
Malaysia	Astro; RTM; TV Okey; Sukan RTM	
MENA Region	beIN Sports	
Pakistan	PTV; PTV Sports	
Philippines	MediaQuest Holdings; TV5 Network; One Sports	
Singapore	Mediacorp; Channel 5; meWATCH	
South Korea	Korean Consortium; SBS; KBS; MBC; TV Chosun; SPOTV; AfreecaTV	
Taiwan (Chinese Taipei)	PTS (PTS3) (Note: Over the air and cable broadcast only); Videoland; VL General; VL Max-TV; VL Sports; EBC; EBC News (Note: EBC News & EBC Financial News 24/7 livestream (including YouTube globally) were blacked out for the Asian Games coverage); EBC Financial News; EBC Super TV; ELTA Sports; Chunghwa Telecom HamiVideo	
Thailand	Television Pool of Thailand; NBT2HD; Thai PBS; TV5 HD; T Sports 7; Workpoint; True4U; GMM 25; MCOT HD; Channel 7 HD; PPTV HD36; AIS PLAY	
Vietnam	VTC (Note: Closing Ceremony only)	

== Concerns and controversies ==
On 18 September 2023, air raid sirens rang out in various regions across China to commemorate the Mukden Incident. Hangzhou used to sound air raid sirens every 18 September, but the practice was suspended this year. This has led to speculation that the decision was made to protect foreigners' feelings, which has sparked dissatisfaction and criticism on Chinese social media.

China issued stapled visas instead of stamped ones to three Indian wushu athletes from Arunachal Pradesh, which China claims as part of its Tibet Autonomous Region, while India administers the state as part of its territory. The issuance of stapled visas has been seen as China's way of questioning India's sovereignty over Arunachal Pradesh. India protested China's decision, and cancelled its sports minister's visit to the games.

North Korea was under WADA sanctions disallowing its flag from being used, but OCA allowed the North Korean flag to be officially used anyway. WADA sent an official warning to OCA over the incident, and later fined the OCA $500,000 (USD).

Ten athletes competing at the games failed their doping tests.

== Evaluation ==
"Technically, we have had one of the best Asian Games ever. The standard of the Games has been very, very high," said Vinod Kumar Tiwari, acting director general of the Olympic Council of Asia (OCA).

Chen said the Asiad has also perfectly combined art and technology, showcasing the beauty of Hangzhou's landscapes and technological confidence to the world.

"Middle East News" stated that Farman, director of the Asian Games Department of the Olympic Council of Asia, believes that the upcoming Asian Games in Hangzhou, China will be inspiring. Farman said at the Asian Games Technical Congress held in Hangzhou recently, "This is the first Asian Games after the COVID-19 pandemic, so it will play a unique, inspiring and important role for the Asian people."

== See also ==
- Previous Asian Games in China
  - 1990 Asian Games – Beijing
  - 2010 Asian Games – Guangzhou
  - 2022 Asian Para Games
- 2021 Summer World University Games in Chengdu, also postponed to 2023 due to the COVID-19 pandemic

== Notes ==
Preceded by Jakarta and Palembang	Asian Games; Hangzhou; XIX Asian Games (2022)	Succeeded by Aichi and Nagoya
