= Shivambu =

Shivambu may refer to:

- Urine therapy, in alternative medicine
- Floyd Shivambu (born 1983), South African politician
  - Brian Shivambu, his brother, implicated in VBS Mutual Bank corruption
