= Beiguodan =

Beiguodan 北郭丹镇
- Town
- Běiguōdān Zhèn
- Location in Hebei Location in China
- Coordinates: 38°38′09″N 115°42′00″E
- Country: People's Republic of China
- Province: Hebei
- Prefecture-level city: Baoding
- County: Li

Area
  - Total: 25.23 km^{2} (9.74 sq mi)

Population (2010)
  - Total: 19,929
  - Density: 789.8/km^{2} (2,046/sq mi)
- Time zone: UTC+8 (China Standard)

Beiguodan (Chinese: 北郭丹镇; pinyin: Běiguōdān Zhèn) is a town located in Li County, Baoding, Hebei, China. According to the 2010 census, Beiguodan had a population of 19,929, including 10,304 males and 9,625 females. The population was distributed as follows: 3,701 people aged under 14, 14,687 people aged between 15 and 64, and 1,541 people aged over 65.

== See also ==
- List of township-level divisions of Hebei
