= Dongyang =

Dongyang 东阳市 Tungyang
- County-level city
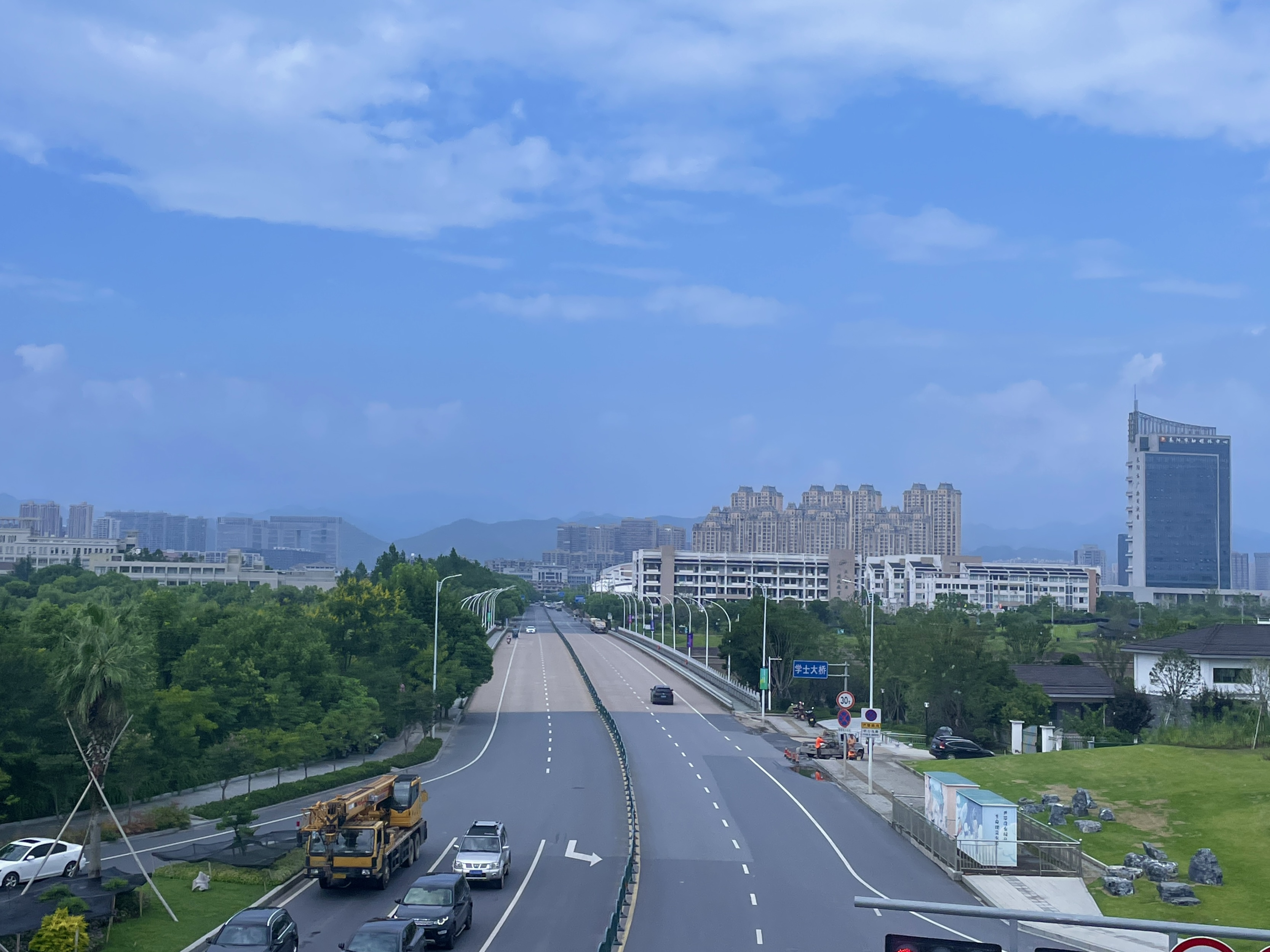

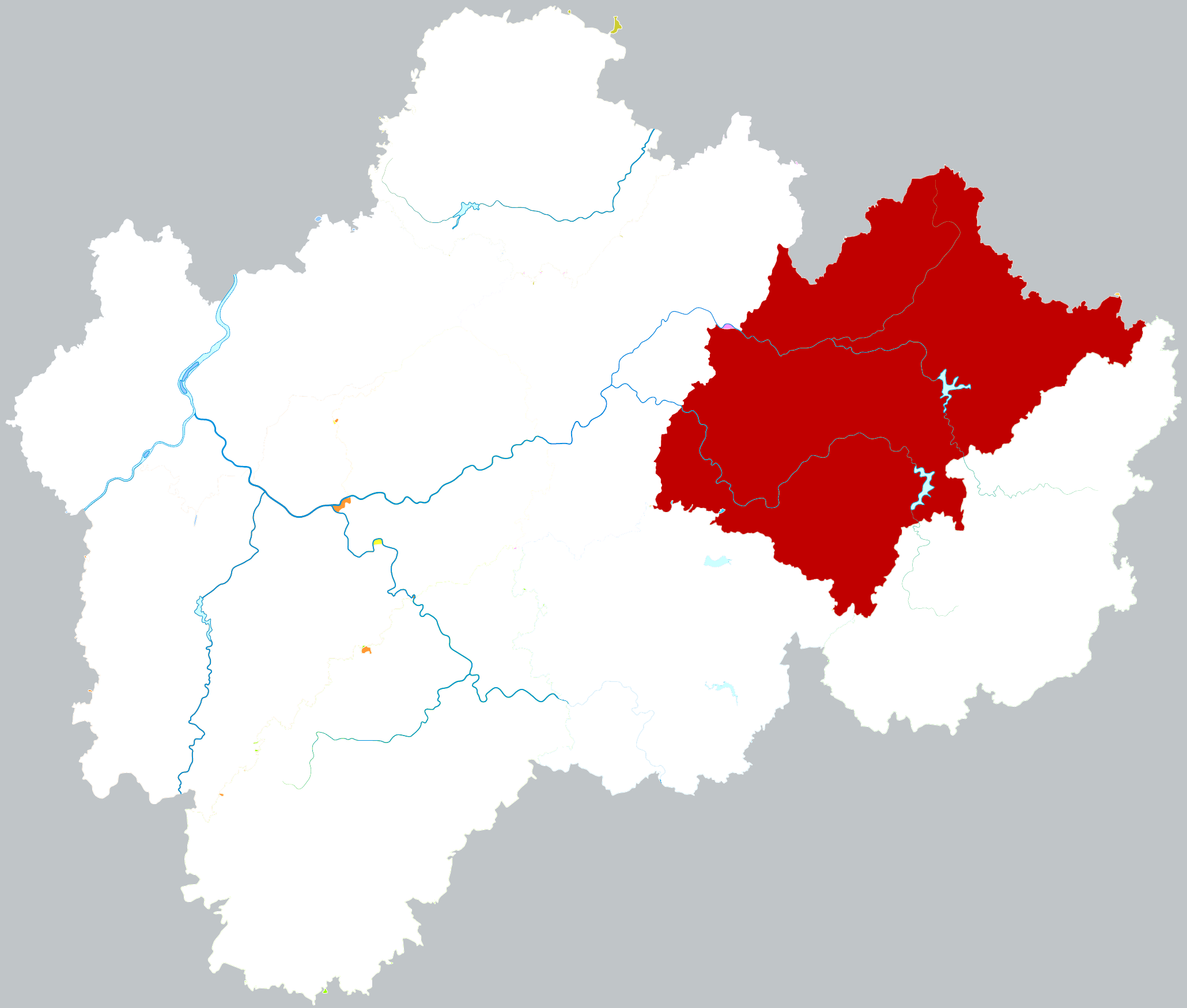
- Location of Dongyang City within Jinhua

- Location in Zhejiang
- Coordinates: 29°16′N 120°13′E
- Country: People's Republic of China
- Province: Zhejiang
- Prefecture-level city: Jinhua
- City Incorporation: May 1988

Government
  - CPC Secretary: Jiang Yongzhi (蒋永志)
  - Mayor: Xu Yuyang (徐育阳)

Area
  - Total: 1,744.05 km^{2} (673.38 sq mi)

Population (2020 census)
  - Total: 1,087,950
  - Density: 623.807/km^{2} (1,615.65/sq mi)
- Time zone: UTC+8 (China Standard Time)
- Postal code: 322100
- Regional Dialect: Dongyang dialect
- Website: www.dongyang.gov.cn

Dongyang (simplified Chinese: 东阳; traditional Chinese: 東陽; pinyin: Dōngyáng; lit. 'east sun') is a county-level city under the jurisdiction of Jinhua in Central Zhejiang Province, China. It covers an area of 1,744.05 km^{2} (673.38 sq mi) and administers eleven towns, one township, and six subdistricts. It is part of the Yangtze River Delta Economic Region.

As of the 2020 census, its population was 1,087,950 inhabitants; however, its built-up (or metro) area, made of Dongyang and the neighboring city of Yiwu, was home to 2,947,340 inhabitants.

== History ==
Dongyang county was first set up in AD 195 (2nd year of Xingping Reign of East Han Dynasty) and known as Wuning (吴宁). In AD 688, the name was changed to Dongyang (东阳) meaning "Eastern Sun".

Dongyang was no longer a county and became a county-level city on May 25, 1988.

== Administrative divisions ==
Subdistricts:

- Wuning Subdistrict (吴宁街道), Nanshi Subdistrict (南市街道), Baiyun Subdistrict (白云街道), Jiangbei Subdistrict (江北街道), Chengdong Subdistrict (城东街道), Liushi Subdistrict (六石街道)

Towns:

- Weishan (巍山镇), Hulu (虎鹿镇), Geshan (歌山镇), Zuocun (佐村镇), Dongyangjiang (东阳江镇), Huxi (湖溪镇), Mazhai (马宅镇), Qianxiang (千祥镇), Nanma (南马镇), Huashui (画水镇), Hengdian (横店镇)

The only township is Sandan Township (三单乡)

== Climate ==
Climate data for Dongyang, elevation 90 m (300 ft), (1991–2020 normals, extremes 1981–present)
Month	Jan	Feb	Mar	Apr	May	Jun	Jul	Aug	Sep	Oct	Nov	Dec	Year
Record high °C (°F)	24.2 (75.6)	28.6 (83.5)	34.7 (94.5)	34.4 (93.9)	37.0 (98.6)	37.8 (100.0)	41.0 (105.8)	42.4 (108.3)	39.6 (103.3)	36.1 (97.0)	32.2 (90.0)	25.5 (77.9)	42.4 (108.3)
Mean daily maximum °C (°F)	9.9 (49.8)	12.7 (54.9)	17.1 (62.8)	23.3 (73.9)	27.8 (82.0)	30.0 (86.0)	34.8 (94.6)	34.0 (93.2)	29.5 (85.1)	24.6 (76.3)	18.9 (66.0)	12.5 (54.5)	22.9 (73.3)
Daily mean °C (°F)	5.8 (42.4)	8.1 (46.6)	12.1 (53.8)	17.9 (64.2)	22.7 (72.9)	25.7 (78.3)	30.0 (86.0)	29.2 (84.6)	25.0 (77.0)	19.8 (67.6)	14.1 (57.4)	8.0 (46.4)	18.2 (64.8)
Mean daily minimum °C (°F)	2.9 (37.2)	4.7 (40.5)	8.4 (47.1)	13.8 (56.8)	18.7 (65.7)	22.4 (72.3)	26.0 (78.8)	25.5 (77.9)	21.5 (70.7)	16.0 (60.8)	10.6 (51.1)	4.6 (40.3)	14.6 (58.3)
Record low °C (°F)	−9.2 (15.4)	−5.5 (22.1)	−2.9 (26.8)	2.0 (35.6)	8.4 (47.1)	11.8 (53.2)	18.6 (65.5)	18.5 (65.3)	11.8 (53.2)	2.9 (37.2)	−2.6 (27.3)	−9.6 (14.7)	−9.6 (14.7)
Average precipitation mm (inches)	80.8 (3.18)	84.0 (3.31)	144.0 (5.67)	143.1 (5.63)	160.4 (6.31)	264.8 (10.43)	124.6 (4.91)	150.9 (5.94)	97.2 (3.83)	55.1 (2.17)	69.8 (2.75)	63.1 (2.48)	1,437.8 (56.61)
Average precipitation days (≥ 0.1 mm)	12.7	12.8	16.3	14.7	15.4	17.1	11.3	14.0	10.5	7.6	10.1	9.8	152.3
Average snowy days	3.4	2.6	0.8	0	0	0	0	0	0	0	0.1	1.4	8.3
Average relative humidity (%)	73	72	71	69	70	77	68	71	74	71	73	71	72
Mean monthly sunshine hours	90.9	97.3	113.8	137.7	151.1	125.7	224.7	204.5	150.6	149.7	120.0	115.9	1,681.9
Percentage possible sunshine	28	31	31	36	36	30	53	50	41	43	38	37	38
Source: China Meteorological Administration all-time extreme temperature September Record High

== Economy ==
Industry is a major component of Dongyang's economy. The city boasts a wide range of industrial sectors, led by electronic, machine building, magnetic material producing, and medical and chemical industries. At present, Dongyang has become the largest magnetic material production and exportation base in China. It is also the third largest medical and pharmaceutical city in Zhejiang, and boasts a group of leading companies in this sphere, such as Hengdian Kangyu Pharmaceutical Co. Ltd, Zhejiang Garden Biological High-tech Co., Ltd, and Zhejiang Hansheng Pharmaceutical Co. Ltd. Dongyang is also home to numerous construction companies, the primary one being Zhongtian. Other productions also include plastics, garments, agricultural products, and wooden sculptures.

The reform and opening policies of the 1970s have accelerated economic growth, and the city ranks among the top 100 cities in China, and the first well-off counties (cities) in Zhejiang Province. In 2005, the city's GDP reached 15.984 billion RMB yuan, earning fiscal revenue of 1.38 billion RMB yuan. Per-capita disposable income for urban households totaled 13,349 RMB yuan, and per-capita net income for farmers amounted to 6,903 RMB yuan.

Dongyang is experiencing a period of great growth, comparable to other regions and cities in Eastern China. In the city square (called Holman Chen), many couples dance to traditional and Chinese pop songs on pleasant evenings.

In one of Dongyang's towns, Hengdian, there is a movie studio, where many films and TV shows about ancient China are made. The movie set has a replica of the Summer Palace, the Great Wall, an ancient Chinese Village and several small European Villages as well as a pirate ship in a man-made lake. The movie Hero, starring Jet Li was filmed there, as well as the recent video game adaptation under the same name.

== Tourist attractions ==
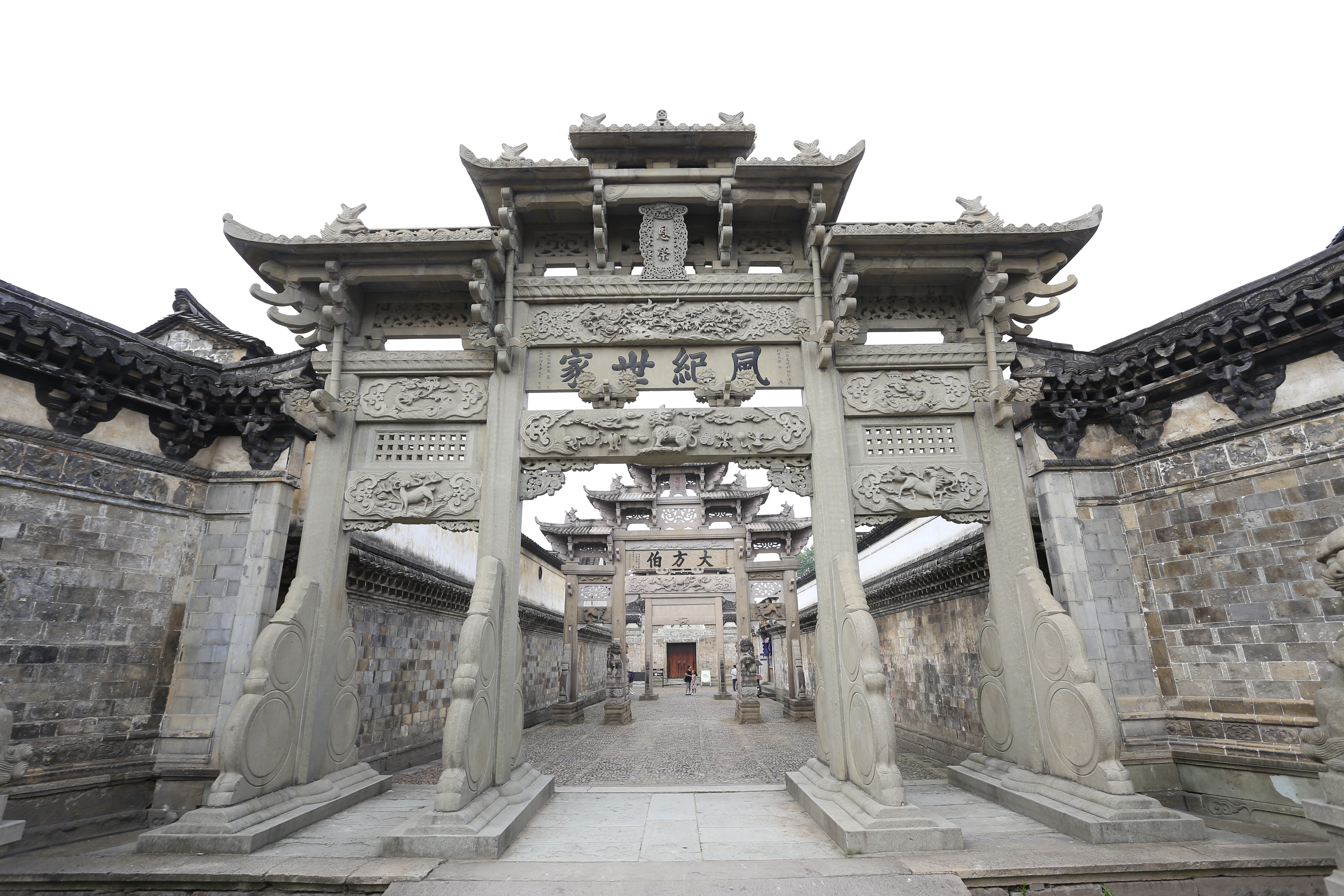
Lu Residential Complex

Lu Residential Complex (卢宅) is one of the key historical and cultural sites under state-level protection in China. Located in downtown Dongyang, the great architectural complex has been the habitation for the Lu family for 800 years. It is well known as the Imperial Palace in South China. It is composed of six groups of buildings. The residential complex is ancient, delicate, and magnificent, and the buildings inside dating from Ming and Qing Dynasties feature the typical Ming-Qing architectural style.

Hengdian World Studios (横店影视城) is nicknamed as "Chinawood" (the Hollywood of China). The elaborately designed bases and studios there have attracted many directors both from home and abroad. Over 400 films have been shot in the Hengdian World Studios, including some popular films, such as Opium War, the Emperor and the Assassin, Hanwu the Great, Hero, the Promise, Curse of the Golden Flower, and the Forbidden Kingdom, etc.

Dongbai Mountain (东白山)'s highest peak, Taibai Peak is the main peak of the Kuaiji Mountains, with an altitude of 1194.6 meters. The main peak is located in Hulu Town, Dongyang City, Zhejiang Province. Since ancient times, it has been the head of the famous mountains in central Zhejiang, the "roof" of Zhejiang's geography.

== Culture ==
Dongyang also has Baiyun Cultural Park, a place for relaxation with several representations of Daoism and Buddhism including a 50-foot statue.

Dongyang wood carving (东阳木雕) is reputed as one of the best folk handicrafts and a national treasure, as one of the four major schools of woodcarving in China. Dongyang woodcarving came into being early in the Tang dynasty. In the Song dynasty, it became state of the art. During the Ming and Qing dynasties, Dongyang woodcarving flourished.

A famous local tradition in Dongyang is the virgin boy egg (Chinese: 童子尿煮鸡蛋; pinyin: Tóngzǐ Niào Zhǔ Jīdàn), an annual tradition in early spring time where the urine of prepubertal school boys preferably under 10 years is collected and boiled with eggs and then sold (for 1.50 yuan around twice the price of a regular boiled egg.) and eaten, it is said "it tastes like spring". In 2008, Dongyang recognized the eggs as "local intangible cultural heritage."

== Transport ==
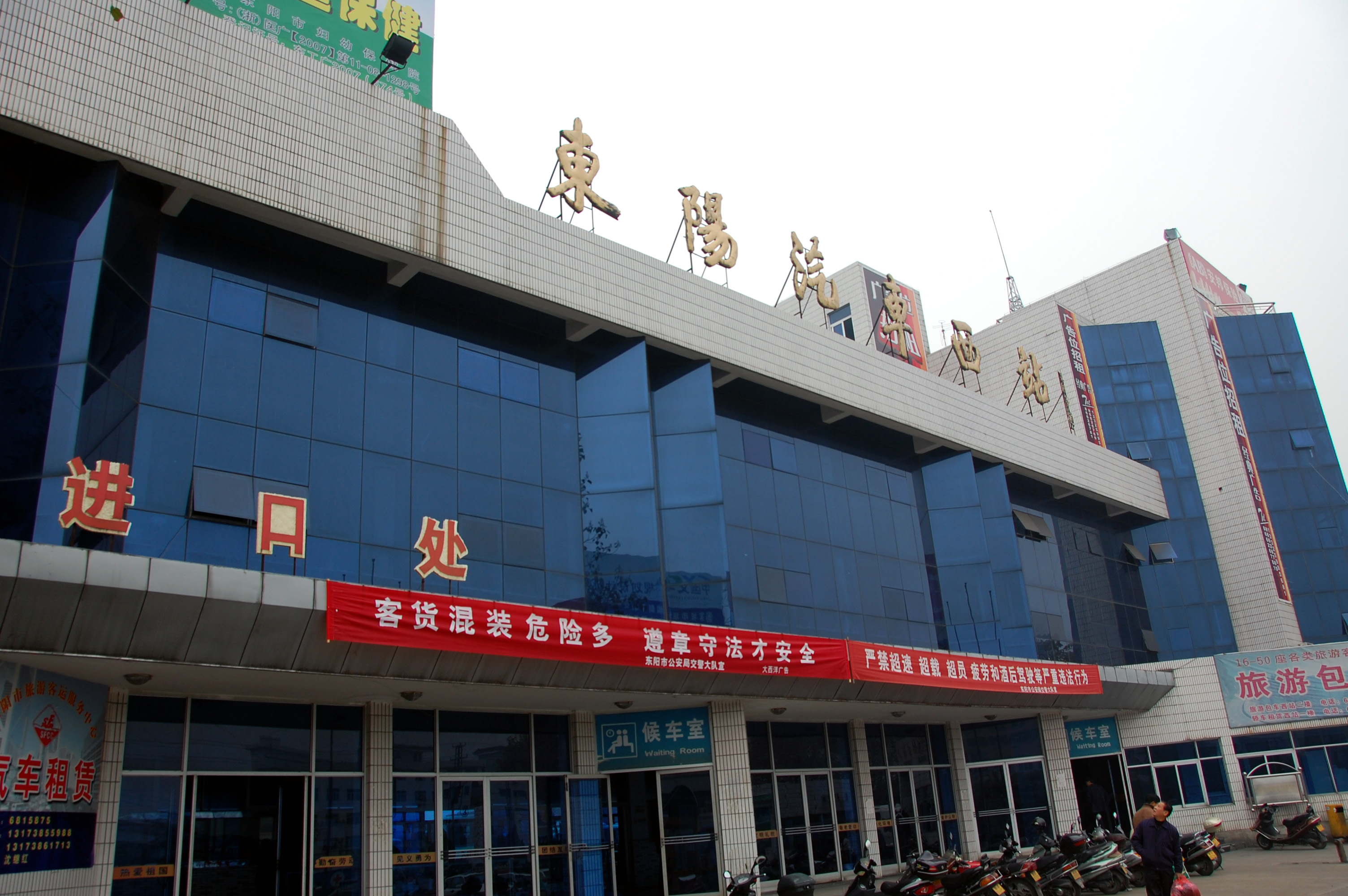
Dongyang West Bus Station

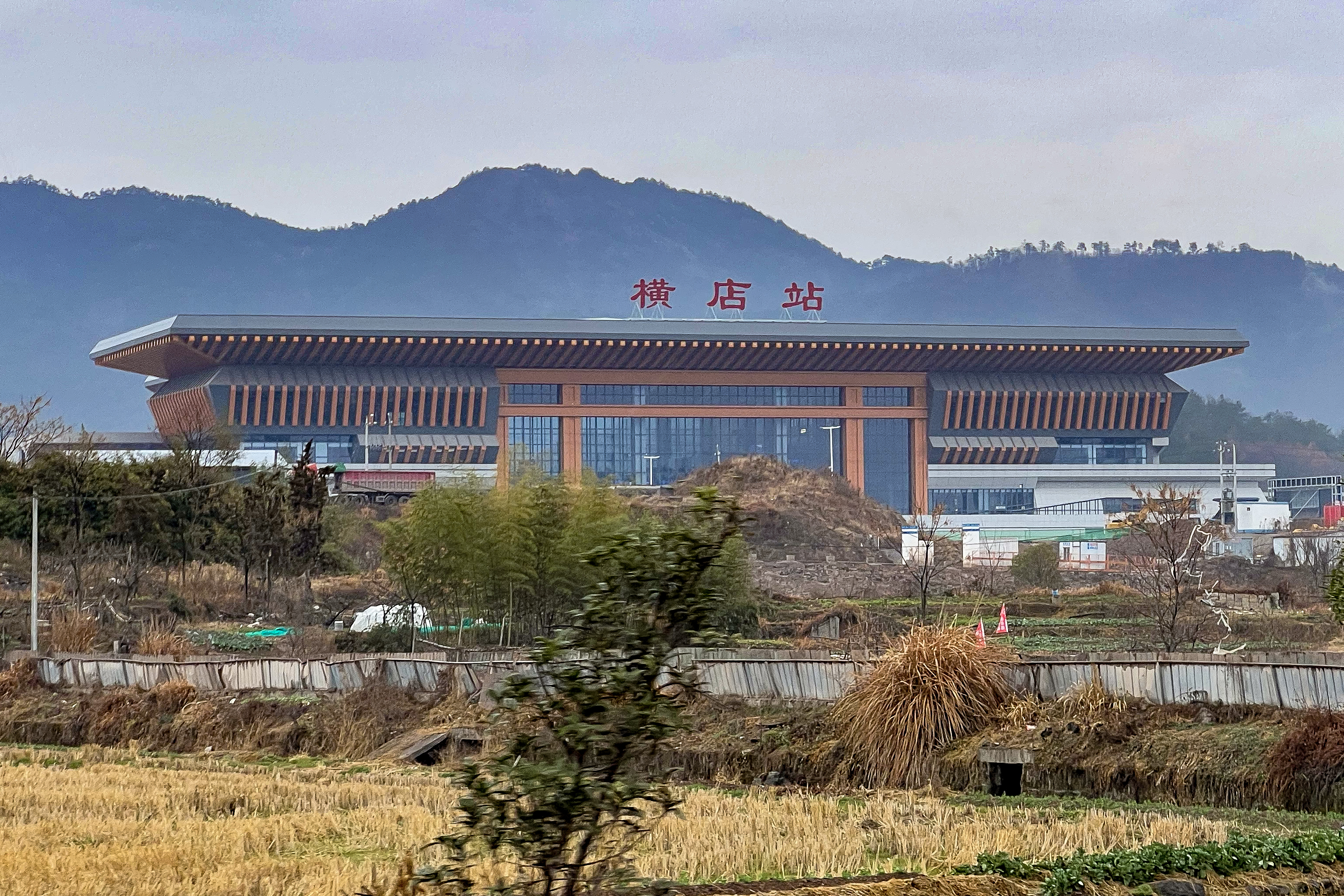
Hengdian railway station

Dongyang is approximately one and a half hours by train from Shanghai, where it is also possible to catch a long-distance bus (about 4 hours). Close to Dongyang is Yiwu, which is a 25-minute taxi ride away. Hangzhou is approximately two-hour taxi from Dongyang.

Jinyidong line, a metro line to Yiwu and downtown Jinhua, also serves Dongyang including Hengdian World Studios.

== Sister city ==
- Kokomo, Indiana, United States

== Specialty ==
South jujube; Dongyang Soup Powder; Dongyang jujube; Dongbai Spring Tea; Virgin Boy Eggs.
