= Wan'an, Hebei =

Wan'an 万安镇
- Town
- Location in Hebei
- Coordinates: 38°38′35″N 115°39′25″E
- Country: People's Republic of China
- Province: Hebei
- Prefecture-level city: Baoding
- County: Li County
- Time zone: UTC+8 (China Standard)

Wan'an (simplified Chinese: 万安; traditional Chinese: 萬安; pinyin: Wàn'ān) is a town under the administration of Li County, Hebei, China. As of 2018, it has 14 villages under its administration.
