= Li County, Hebei =

Li County 蠡县
- County
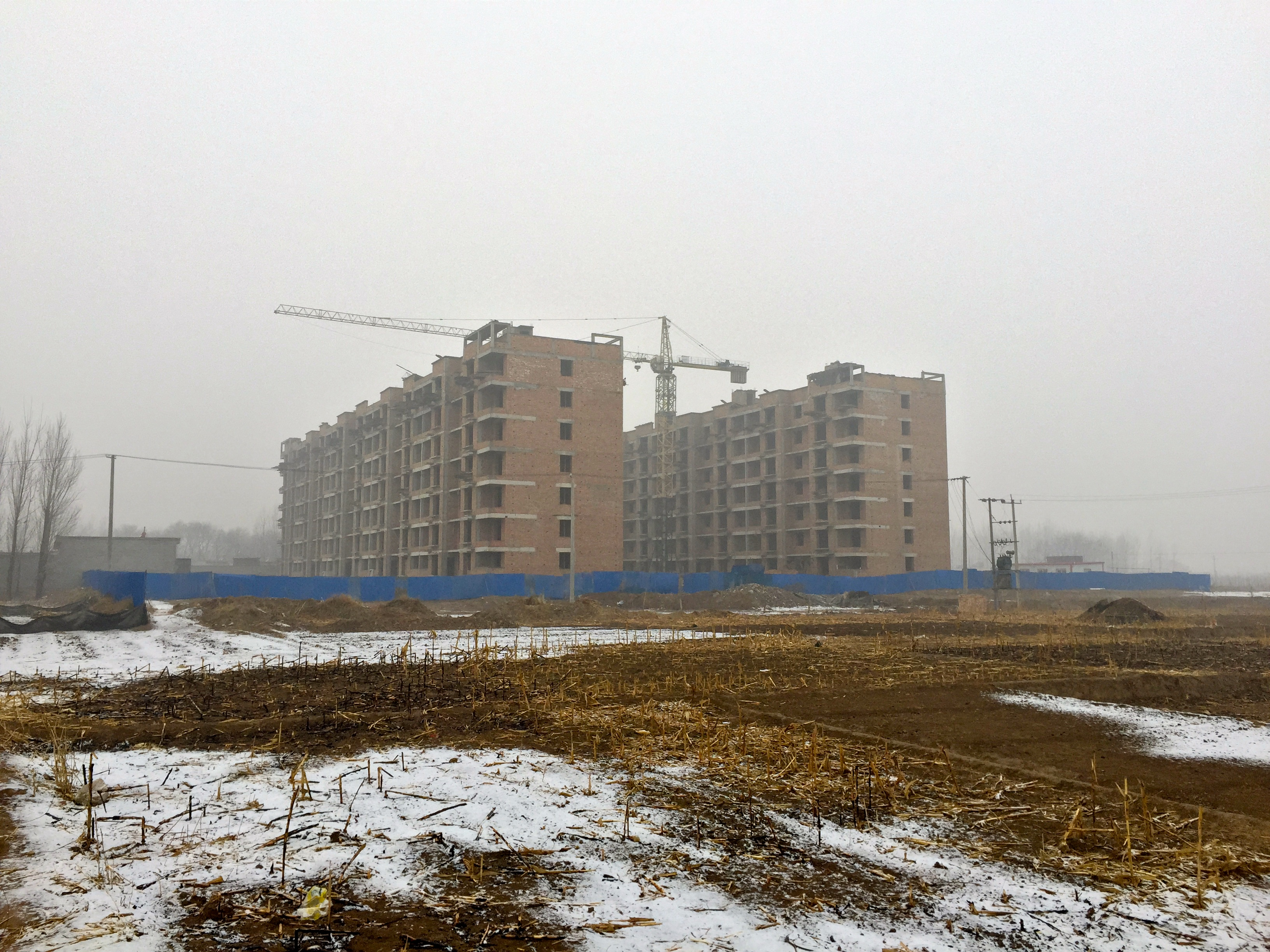

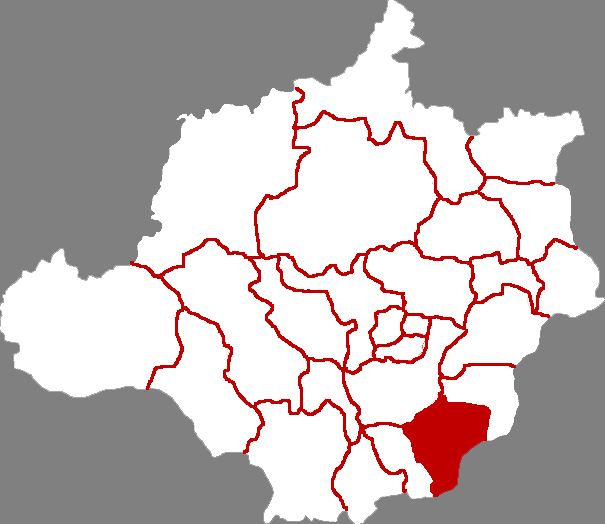
- Li County in Baoding

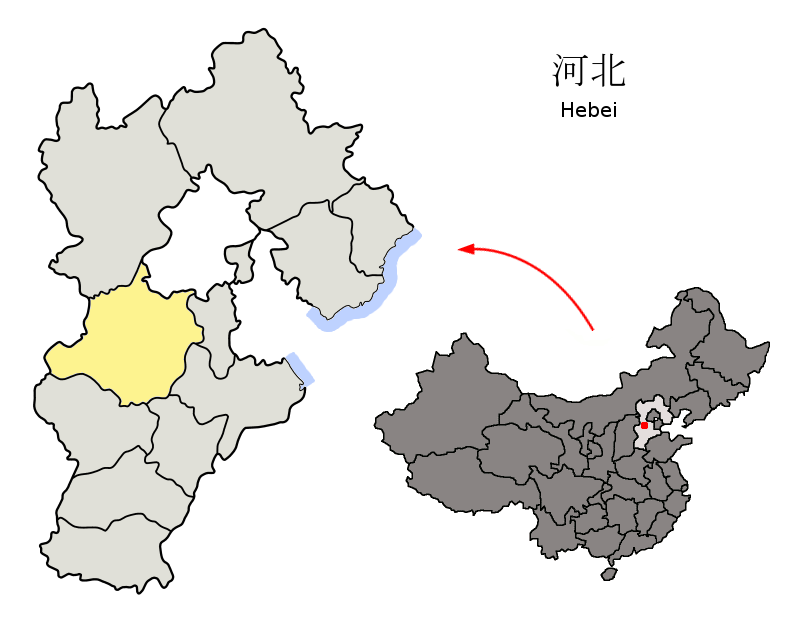
- Baoding in Hebei
- Coordinates: 38°29′17″N 115°35′02″E
- Country: People's Republic of China
- Province: Hebei
- Prefecture-level city: Baoding

Area
  - Total: 649.8 km^{2} (250.9 sq mi)

Population (2020 census)
  - Total: 488,152
  - Density: 751.2/km^{2} (1,946/sq mi)
- Time zone: UTC+8 (China Standard)
- Website: www.lixian.gov.cn

Li County or Lixian (simplified Chinese: 蠡县; traditional Chinese: 蠡縣; pinyin: Lǐ xiàn) is a county under the jurisdiction of Baoding prefecture-level city, Hebei, China.

== Administrative divisions ==
- Towns : Liwu (蠡吾镇), Liushi (留史镇), Dabaichi (大百尺镇), Xinxing (辛兴镇), Beiguodan (北郭丹镇), Wan'an (万安镇), Sangyuan (桑园镇), Nanzhuang, Li County, Hebei (南庄镇)
- Townships : Xiaochen Township (小陈乡), Linbao Township (林堡乡), Beiniantou Township (北埝头乡), Baoxu Township (鲍墟乡), Daquti Township (大曲堤乡)

== Climate ==
Climate data for Lixian, elevation 19 m (62 ft), (1991–2020 normals, extremes 1981–2010)
Month	Jan	Feb	Mar	Apr	May	Jun	Jul	Aug	Sep	Oct	Nov	Dec	Year
Record high °C (°F)	16.7 (62.1)	23.0 (73.4)	30.8 (87.4)	34.0 (93.2)	38.7 (101.7)	40.5 (104.9)	40.9 (105.6)	37.4 (99.3)	35.5 (95.9)	32.0 (89.6)	23.6 (74.5)	19.3 (66.7)	40.9 (105.6)
Mean daily maximum °C (°F)	2.8 (37.0)	7.1 (44.8)	14.4 (57.9)	21.8 (71.2)	27.7 (81.9)	32.1 (89.8)	32.4 (90.3)	30.6 (87.1)	26.8 (80.2)	20.3 (68.5)	11.0 (51.8)	4.2 (39.6)	19.3 (66.7)
Daily mean °C (°F)	−3.5 (25.7)	0.6 (33.1)	7.6 (45.7)	15.1 (59.2)	21.1 (70.0)	25.8 (78.4)	27.3 (81.1)	25.7 (78.3)	20.7 (69.3)	13.6 (56.5)	4.9 (40.8)	−1.6 (29.1)	13.1 (55.6)
Mean daily minimum °C (°F)	−8.5 (16.7)	−4.6 (23.7)	1.6 (34.9)	8.7 (47.7)	14.6 (58.3)	19.7 (67.5)	22.7 (72.9)	21.4 (70.5)	15.6 (60.1)	8.2 (46.8)	0.2 (32.4)	−5.9 (21.4)	7.8 (46.1)
Record low °C (°F)	−22.5 (−8.5)	−17.3 (0.9)	−10.6 (12.9)	−3.5 (25.7)	4.7 (40.5)	9.2 (48.6)	15.6 (60.1)	12.8 (55.0)	4.5 (40.1)	−5.0 (23.0)	−15.1 (4.8)	−20.1 (−4.2)	−22.5 (−8.5)
Average precipitation mm (inches)	1.9 (0.07)	4.6 (0.18)	8.0 (0.31)	25.7 (1.01)	34.6 (1.36)	59.9 (2.36)	132.8 (5.23)	108.2 (4.26)	47.2 (1.86)	25.9 (1.02)	13.5 (0.53)	2.3 (0.09)	464.6 (18.28)
Average precipitation days (≥ 0.1 mm)	1.3	2.1	2.7	5.0	6.0	8.3	11.4	10.5	6.5	5.0	3.6	1.7	64.1
Average snowy days	2.2	2.1	0.9	0.2	0	0	0	0	0	0	1.2	2.4	9
Average relative humidity (%)	59	53	50	53	57	60	74	79	74	68	67	62	63
Mean monthly sunshine hours	150.5	161.2	217.2	244.2	270.3	235.4	205.0	202.5	191.7	180.7	157.0	146.7	2,362.4
Percentage possible sunshine	49	52	58	61	61	53	46	49	52	53	52	50	53
Source: China Meteorological Administration

== Religion ==
The Catholic minority is pastorally served by the Apostolic Prefecture of Lixian (Lizhou/ Lichow).

== Sources and external links ==
- xzqh.org
- GCatholic
