= Lianhua County =

Lianhua County 莲花县 Lienhwa
- County
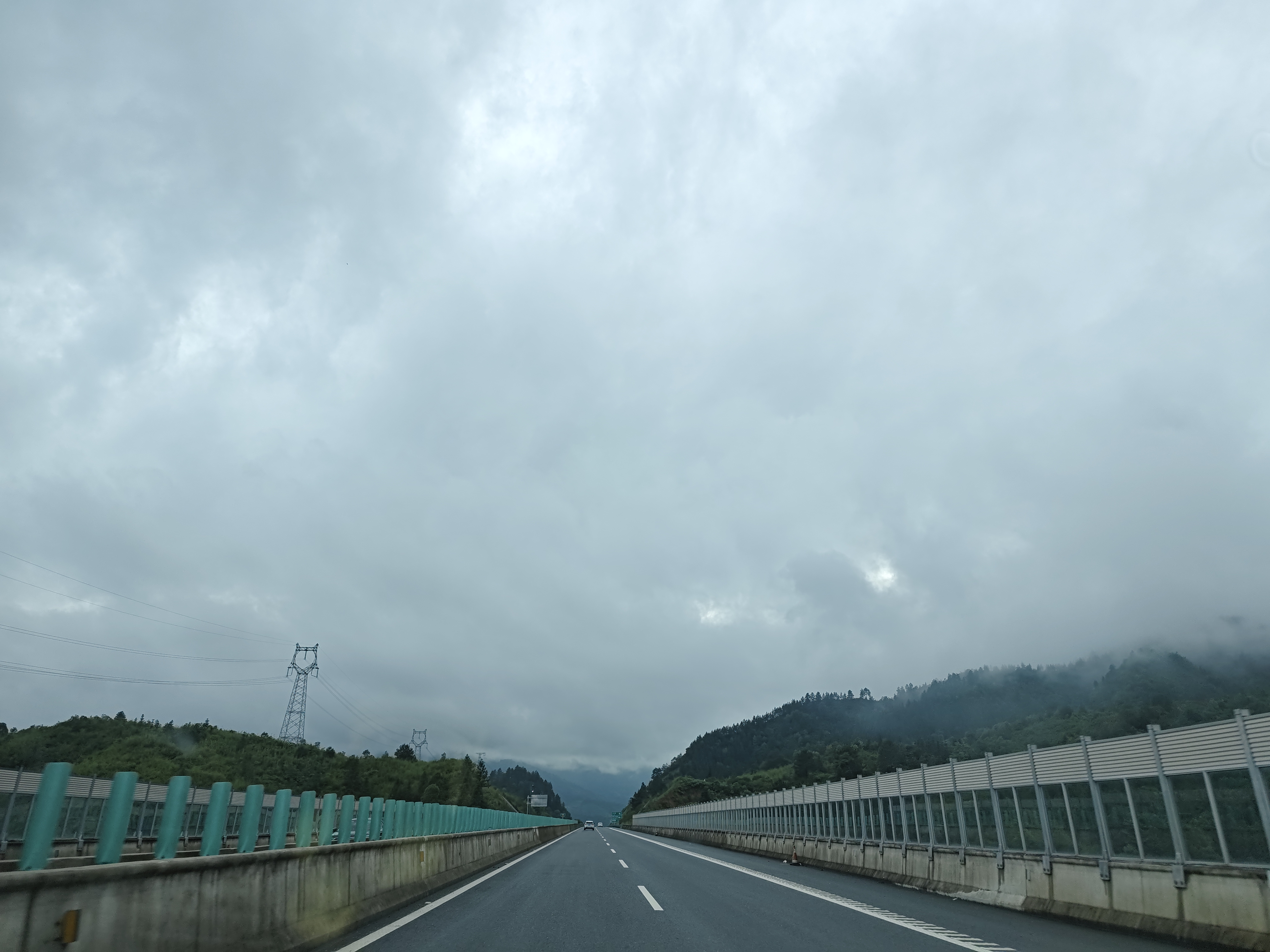

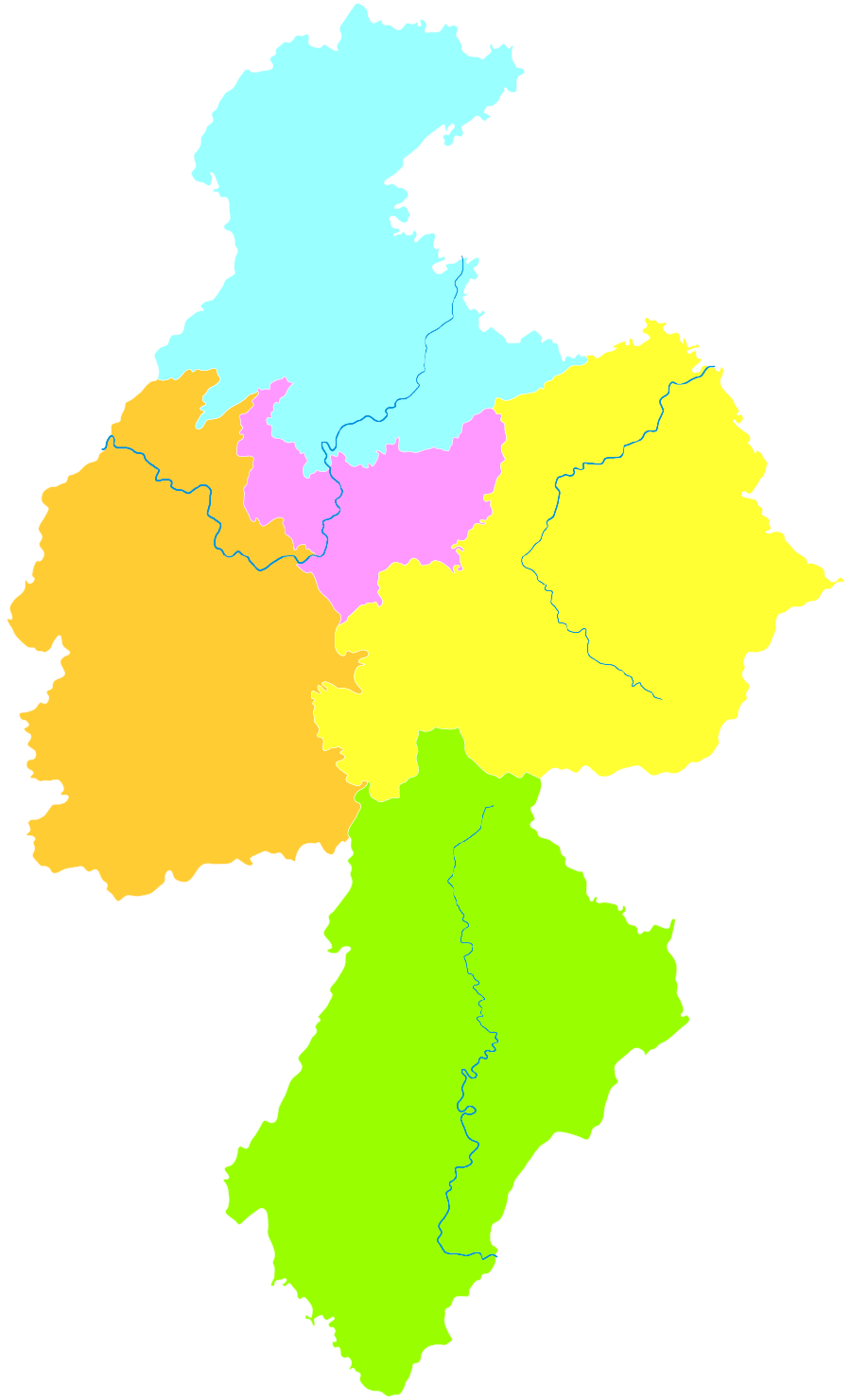
- Lianhua is the southernmost division in this map of Pingxiang

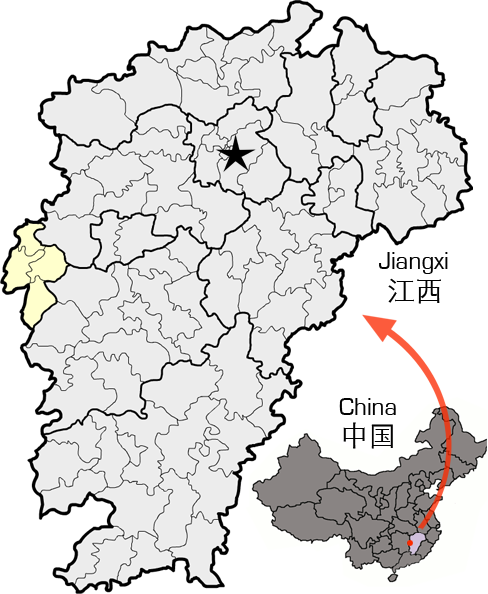
- Pingxiang in Jiangxi
- Coordinates: 27°07′40″N 113°57′41″E
- Country: People's Republic of China
- Province: Jiangxi
- Prefecture-level city: Pingxiang

Area
  - Total: 1,072 km^{2} (414 sq mi)

Population (2018)
  - Total: 279,400
  - Density: 260.6/km^{2} (675.0/sq mi)
- Time zone: UTC+8 (China Standard)
- Postal code: 337100

Lianhua County (simplified Chinese: 莲花县; traditional Chinese: 蓮花縣; pinyin: Liánhuā Xiàn) is a county in the west of Jiangxi province, China, bordering Hunan province to the west. It is the southernmost county-level division of the prefecture-level city of Pingxiang.

== Geography ==
Lianhua lies in the Luoxiao Mountains, somewhat north of Jinggangshan.

== Revolutionary History ==
Hard on the Hunan border, Lianhua was the headquarters of the (South-)Eastern Hunan Red Army Independent Division, and thus the administrative centre for the Hunan-Jiangxi Soviet, a constituent part of the Chinese Soviet Republic of the early 1930s.

== Administrative divisions ==
Lianhua County has 5 towns and 8 townships.

5 towns

- Qinting (琴亭镇)
- Lukou (路口镇)
- Liangfang (良坊镇)
- Shengfang (升坊镇)
- Fanglou (坊楼镇)

8 townships

- Shanshi Township (闪石乡)
- Hushang Township (湖上乡)
- Sanbanqiao Township (三板桥乡)
- Shenquan Township (神泉乡)
- Liushi Township (六市乡)
- Gaozhou Township (高洲乡)
- Hetang Township (荷塘乡)
- Nanling Township (南岭乡)

== Climate ==
Climate data for Lianhua, elevation 195 m (640 ft), (1991–2020 normals, extremes 1981–2010)
Month	Jan	Feb	Mar	Apr	May	Jun	Jul	Aug	Sep	Oct	Nov	Dec	Year
Record high °C (°F)	25.5 (77.9)	30.6 (87.1)	34.5 (94.1)	35.2 (95.4)	36.9 (98.4)	37.3 (99.1)	40.5 (104.9)	41.1 (106.0)	38.0 (100.4)	37.3 (99.1)	32.5 (90.5)	25.5 (77.9)	41.1 (106.0)
Mean daily maximum °C (°F)	10.6 (51.1)	13.5 (56.3)	17.1 (62.8)	23.7 (74.7)	28.0 (82.4)	30.8 (87.4)	34.1 (93.4)	33.4 (92.1)	30.0 (86.0)	25.4 (77.7)	19.6 (67.3)	13.6 (56.5)	23.3 (74.0)
Daily mean °C (°F)	6.5 (43.7)	8.9 (48.0)	12.5 (54.5)	18.4 (65.1)	22.9 (73.2)	26.0 (78.8)	28.6 (83.5)	27.9 (82.2)	24.6 (76.3)	19.6 (67.3)	13.9 (57.0)	8.4 (47.1)	18.2 (64.7)
Mean daily minimum °C (°F)	3.7 (38.7)	5.8 (42.4)	9.4 (48.9)	14.8 (58.6)	19.2 (66.6)	22.7 (72.9)	24.6 (76.3)	24.2 (75.6)	20.9 (69.6)	15.6 (60.1)	10.0 (50.0)	4.9 (40.8)	14.7 (58.4)
Record low °C (°F)	−5.4 (22.3)	−3.8 (25.2)	−3.5 (25.7)	1.9 (35.4)	8.5 (47.3)	13.1 (55.6)	16.6 (61.9)	17.9 (64.2)	12.2 (54.0)	2.4 (36.3)	−2.1 (28.2)	−8.8 (16.2)	−8.8 (16.2)
Average precipitation mm (inches)	84.1 (3.31)	97.7 (3.85)	195.3 (7.69)	207.0 (8.15)	235.9 (9.29)	263.6 (10.38)	153.4 (6.04)	140.5 (5.53)	80.3 (3.16)	60.1 (2.37)	87.2 (3.43)	60.4 (2.38)	1,665.5 (65.58)
Average precipitation days (≥ 0.1 mm)	15.0	15.0	19.5	18.2	17.2	16.5	11.5	14.1	10.4	8.9	11.3	11.4	169
Average snowy days	2.7	1.5	0.4	0.1	0	0	0	0	0	0	0.1	0.8	5.6
Average relative humidity (%)	81	81	82	80	80	81	75	77	78	76	78	78	79
Mean monthly sunshine hours	62.9	62.6	70.5	99.3	123.2	128.5	214.7	191.1	151.2	136.8	118.0	104.8	1,463.6
Percentage possible sunshine	19	20	19	26	29	31	51	48	41	39	37	33	33
Source: China Meteorological Administration
