= Virgin boy egg =

Traditional dish of Dongyang, Zhejiang, China

- Chinese: 童子蛋
- Literal meaning: boy egg
Transcriptions
Standard Mandarin
- Hanyu Pinyin: tóngzǐ dàn

Alternative Chinese name
- Traditional Chinese: 童子尿煮雞蛋
- Simplified Chinese: 童子尿煮鸡蛋
- Literal meaning: boy urine-cooked chicken egg
Transcriptions
Standard Mandarin
- Hanyu Pinyin: tóngzǐ niào zhǔ jīdàn

Virgin boy eggs are a traditional dish of Dongyang, Zhejiang, China, in which eggs are boiled in the urine of young boys, preferably under the age of ten.

== History ==
The dish is a longstanding tradition in Dongyang, China, dating back centuries. In general, China has had a long history of food preservation methods. Tea eggs were originally developed to preserve the food for long periods of time. While the boy eggs may not have necessarily had the same origin, their development comes from a similar cultural background. There have been no consistent or conclusive explanations given for why boys' urine is used specifically; it is what has been done for centuries. It has historically been thought in the Zhejiang region that urine has various health benefits, and it was commonly ingested in ancient times.

== Preparation ==
The dish is prepared by first soaking the eggs in the urine of young boys, then the mixture is heated over a stove. After boiling, the surfaces of the egg shells are cracked and the eggs are placed back into the urine. The used urine is then replaced with fresh urine and the process is repeated. The soaking process cures the eggs in the urine. The entire process generally takes a full day. According to some recipes, different herbs may also be added. When finished, the eggs' whites have a pale golden hue and the yolks turn green. Virgin boy eggs are similar to century eggs in their curing process and historical roots, although century eggs have become much more popular and do not use urine.

== Modern culture ==
Virgin boy eggs are widely accepted as a tradition in the city. Boy egg vendors go to elementary schools in the city where they collect urine from young boys, preferably under the age of ten. Children who have been raised in the city are used to the practice and relieve themselves in basins that the vendors place in the hallways. The teachers often remind the boys not to urinate in the basins if any of them have a fever or feel ill. Some vendors wait with containers in parks or public restrooms for a parent who is willing to let their child offer urine. Dongyang residents are also known to prepare the dish at home using urine from household boys. Although modern medical research shows no evidence of health benefits from ingesting urine, the eggs continue to be consumed. As of 2012, the eggs are sold for about 1.50 yuan (approximately $0.24) each, roughly twice the price of normal eggs. Not all of the city's residents enjoy the dish. One local man was quoted stating, "The smell kills me. I feel like throwing up at the thought of it. It stinks." In general, the eggs remain highly acclaimed by the people of Dongyang for both their taste and even their "fragrant" smell.

In 2026, a coffee shop in Dongyang started selling Americano coffees containing the eggs. The drinks were popular, selling over 100 a day on weekends at a price of 28 yuan a cup. The shop claimed that the beverage could prevent sleepiness in spring and also prevent heat stroke in the summer.

== Health effects and folk medicine ==
Urine therapy has been a significant part of traditional Chinese medicine for much of its history. In ancient times, urine was used as a means of enhancing the effects of medicine, although today, the practice is widely viewed as unsanitary. It is also claimed that the ingestion of the eggs can treat yin deficiency, decrease internal body heat, and promote blood circulation. Locals assert that the eggs also prevent heat stroke. Modern medical practitioners remain dubious of any health benefits of urine therapy in general; many consider it harmful rather than beneficial.

== See also ==
- List of egg dishes
- Urophagia
