= Sangyuan, Baoding =

Sangyuan 桑园镇
- Town
- Location in Hebei
- Coordinates: 38°37′16″N 115°35′57″E
- Country: People's Republic of China
- Province: Hebei
- Prefecture-level city: Baoding
- County: Li County
- Time zone: UTC+8 (China Standard)

Sangyuan (simplified Chinese: 桑园; traditional Chinese: 桑園; pinyin: Sāngyuán) is a town under the administration of Li County in Baoding, Hebei, China. As of 2018, it has 12 villages under its administration.
