= Gongchen Bridge =

Gongchen Bridge 拱宸桥
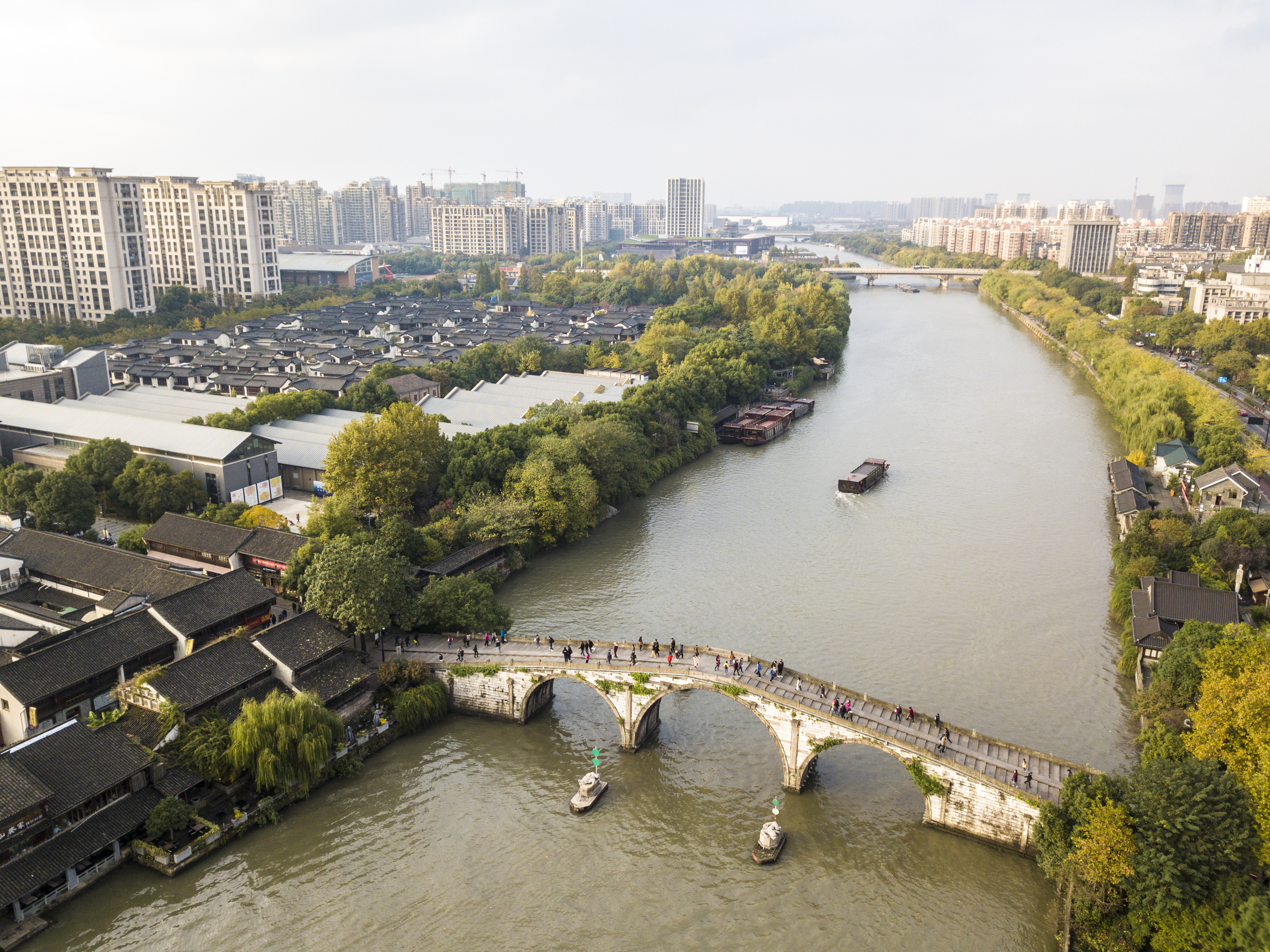
- Gongchen Bridge in November 2017
- Coordinates: 30°19′13.7″N 120°08′05″E
- Carries: Pedestrians and bicycles
- Crosses: Grand Canal
- Locale: Gongshu District of Hangzhou, Zhejiang, China

Characteristics
- Design: Arch bridge
- Material: Stone
- Total length: 92.1 metres (302 ft)
- Width: 5.9 metres (19 ft)
- Height: 9.2 metres (30 ft)

History
- Construction end: 1631
- Rebuilt: 1885

Location
- Interactive map of Gongchen Bridge

The Gongchen Bridge (simplified Chinese: 拱宸桥; traditional Chinese: 拱宸橋; pinyin: Qiáo) is a historic stone arch bridge over the Grand Canal in Gongshu District of Hangzhou, Zhejiang, China.

== History ==
Gongchen Bridge was originally built in 1631, during the reign of the Chongzhen Emperor of the Ming dynasty (1368–1644), and was rebuilt in 1885, during the reign of the Guangxu Emperor of the Qing dynasty (1644–1911). On 6 May 2013, it was listed among the seventh batch of "Major National Historical and Cultural Sites in Zhejiang" by the State Council of China.

== Gallery ==
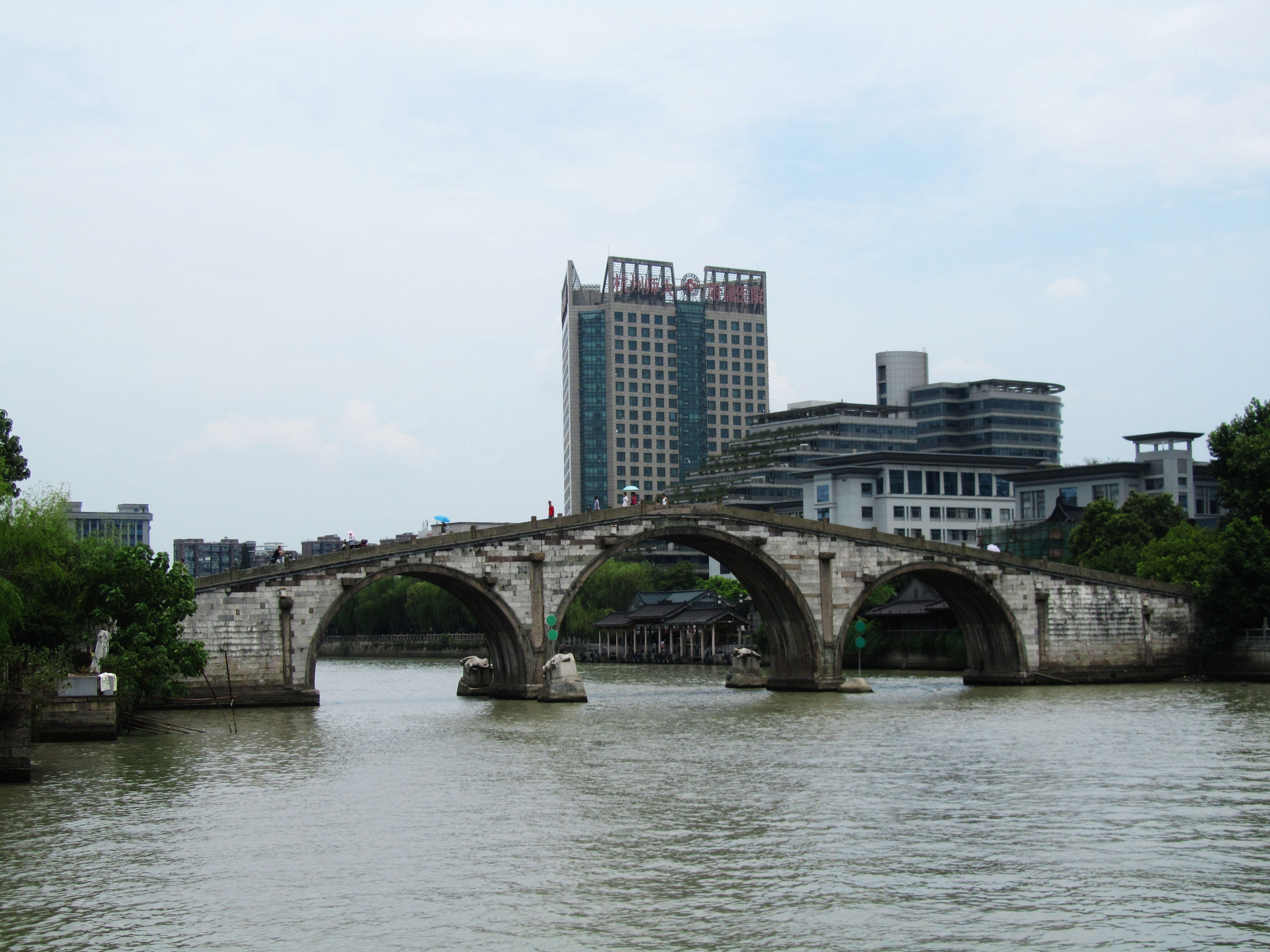
Gongchen Bridge in July 2013

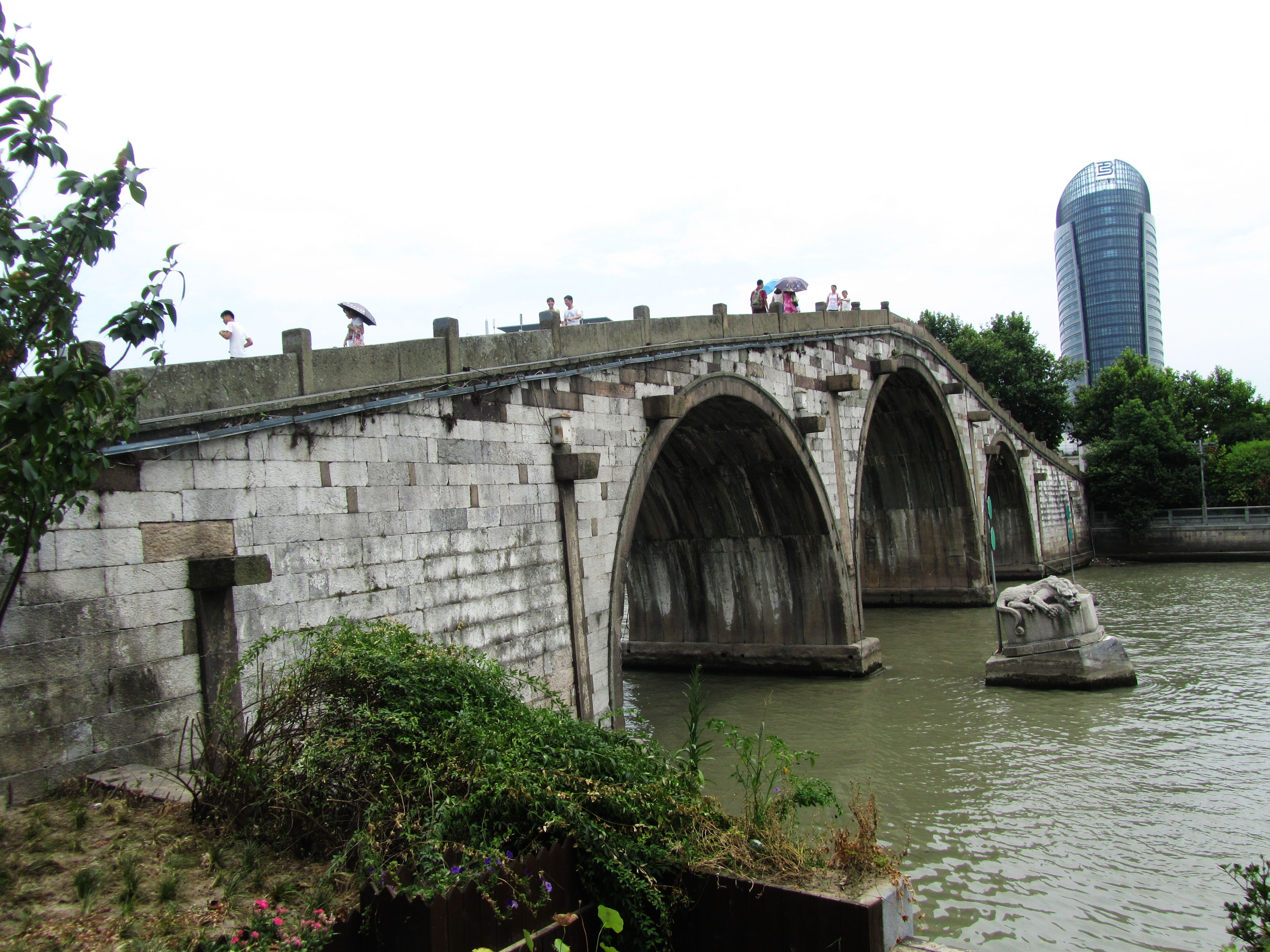
Gongchen Bridge in July 2013

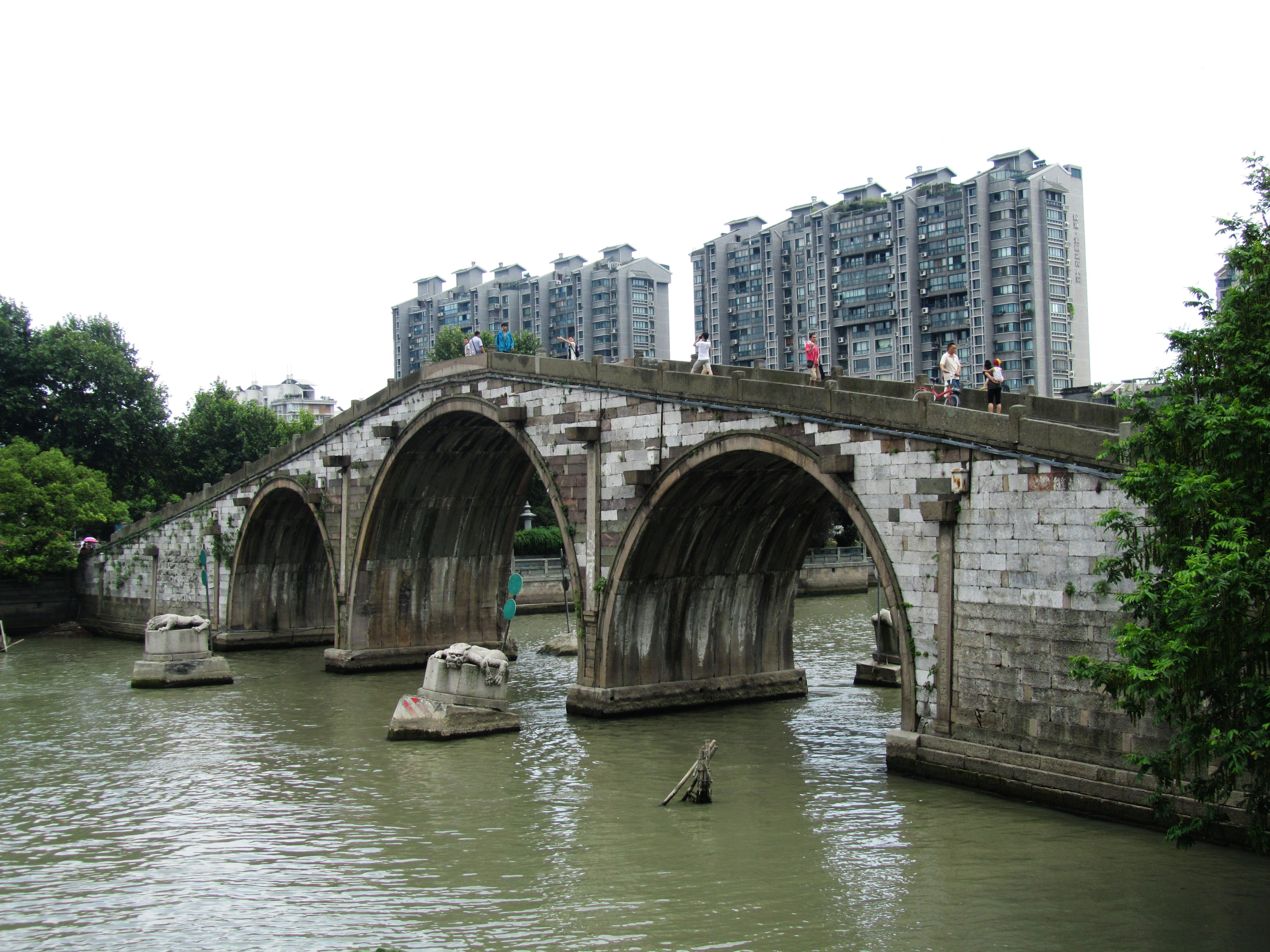
Gongchen Bridge in July 2013

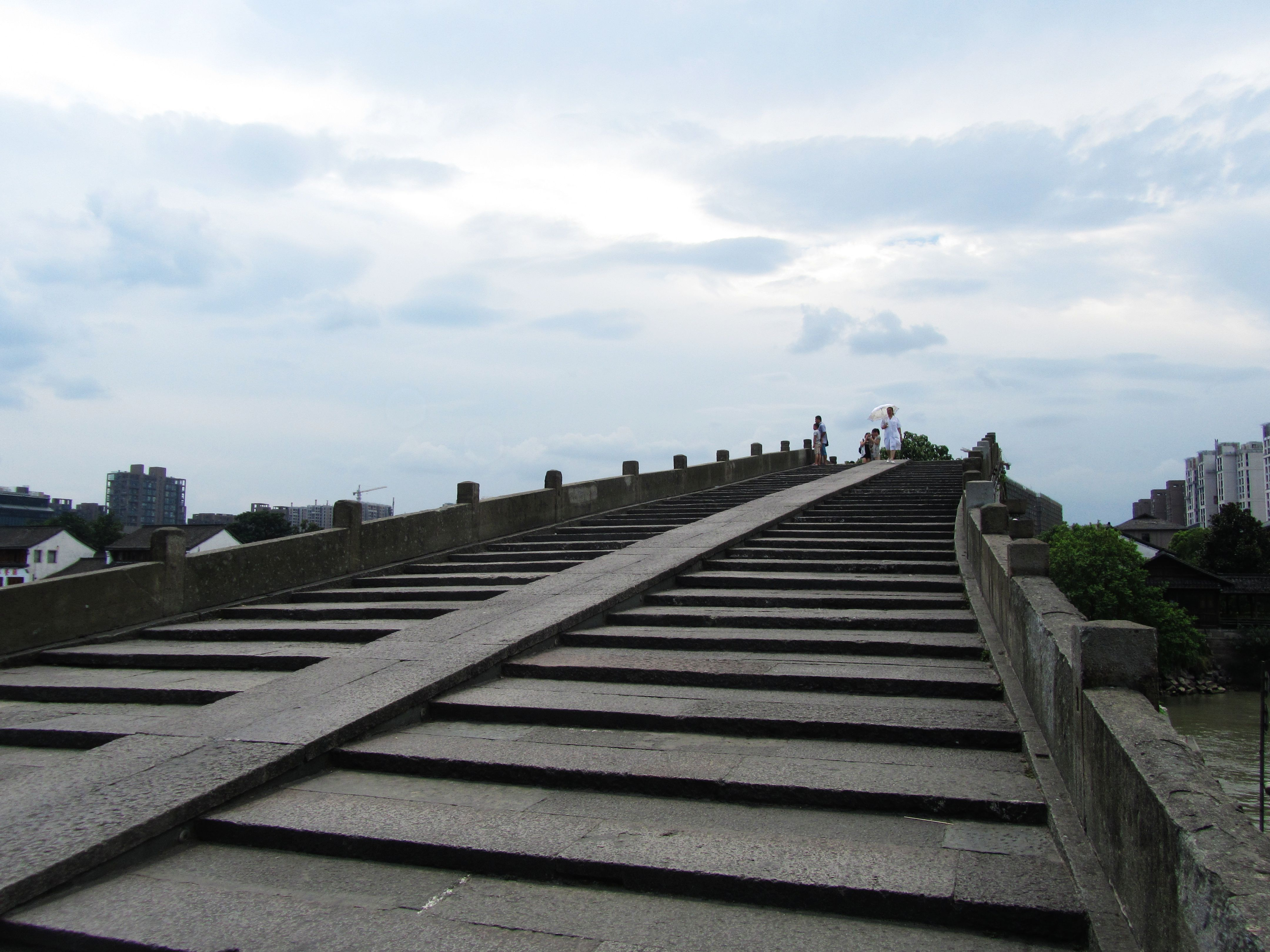
Gongchen Bridge in July 2013

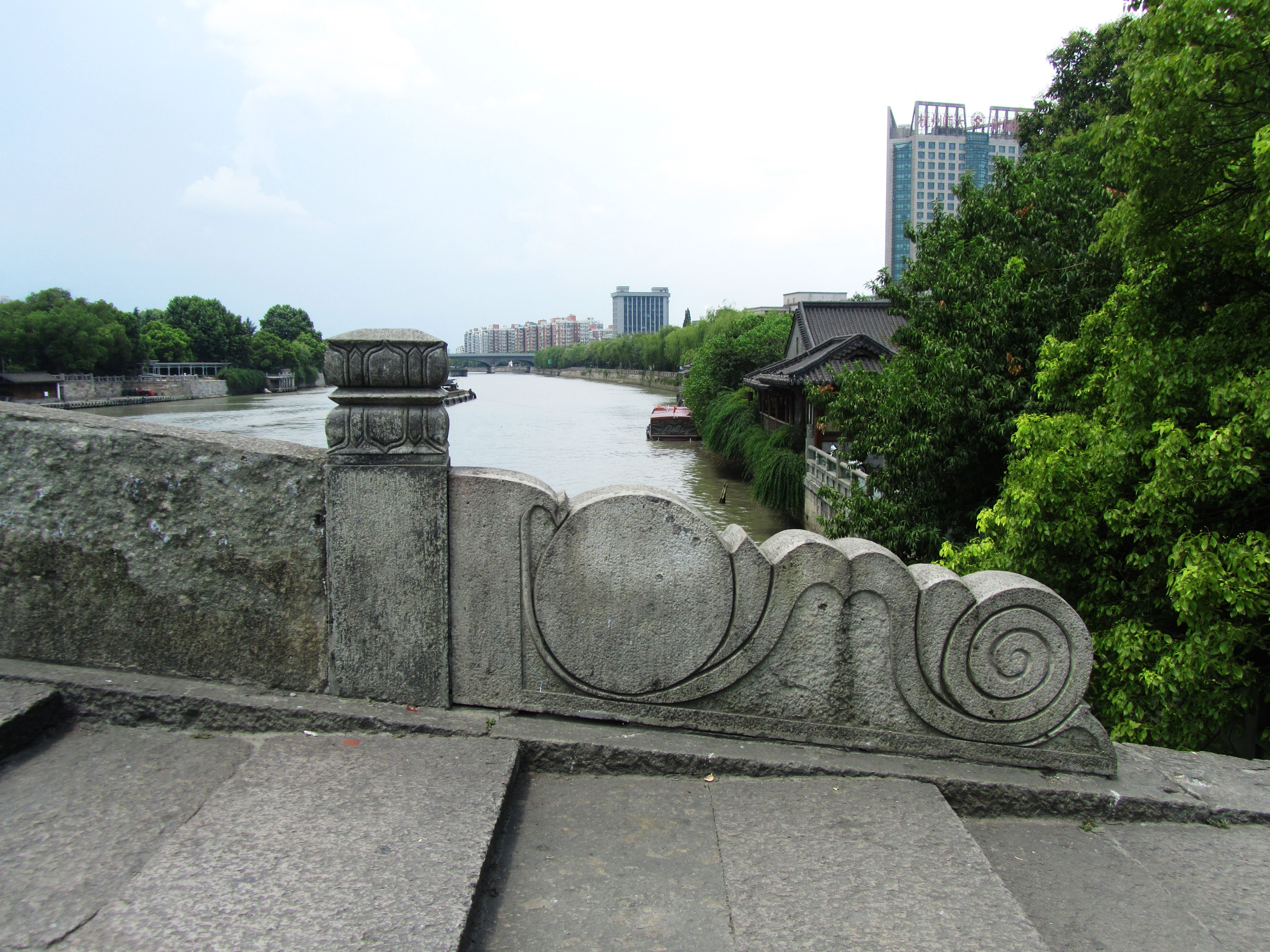
Drum-shaped bearing stone

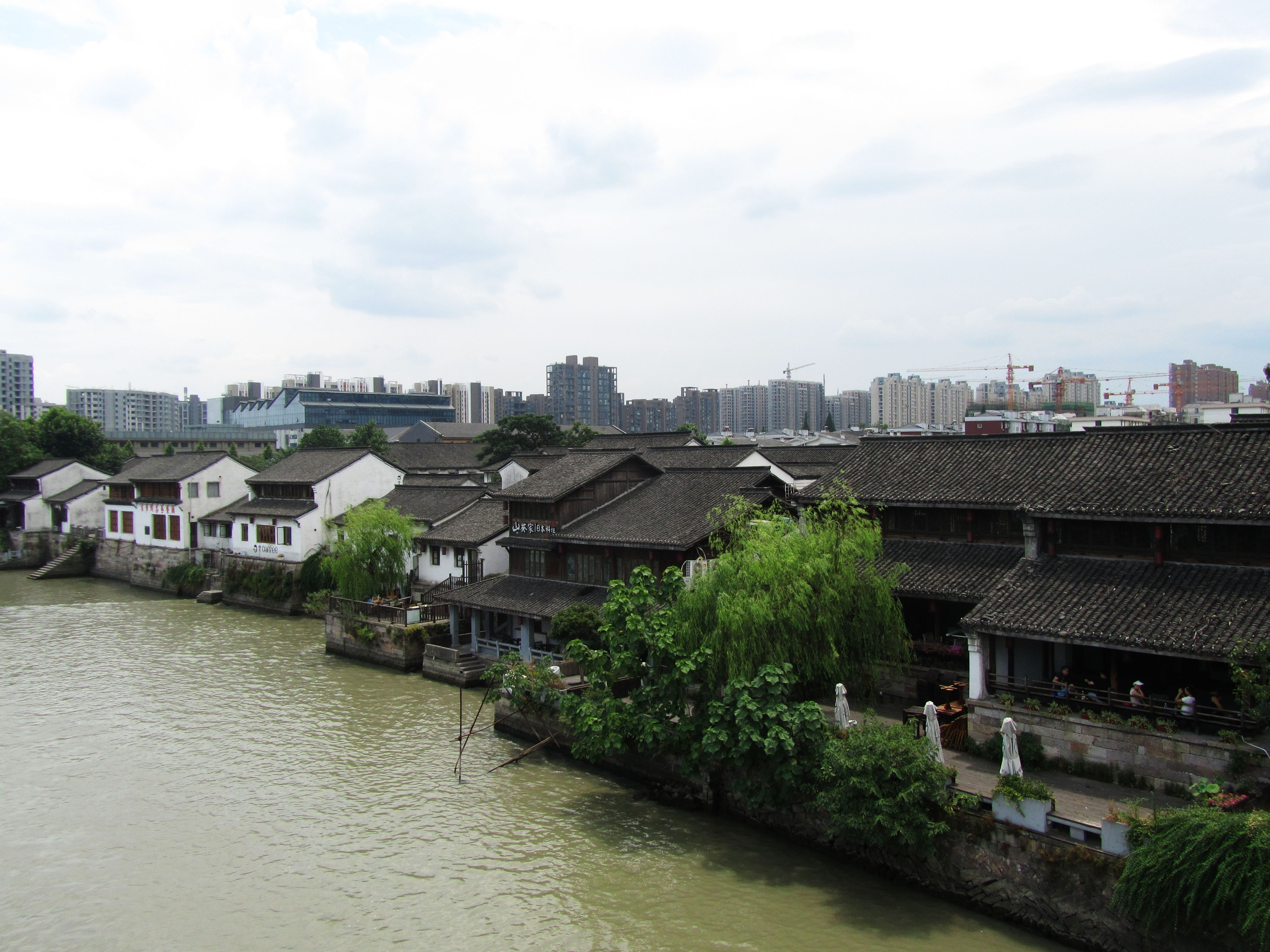

== Surrounding area ==
- East Gongchen Bridge station
