= Liushi, Hebei =

Liushi 留史镇
- Town
- Location in Hebei
- Coordinates: 38°32′40″N 115°44′46″E
- Country: People's Republic of China
- Province: Hebei
- Prefecture-level city: Baoding
- County: Li County
- Time zone: UTC+8 (China Standard)

Liushi (Chinese: 留史) is a town of Li County, Hebei, China. As of 2018, it has 26 villages under its administration.
