= Liushi Subdistrict, Dongyang =

Liushi Subdistrict 六石街道
- Subdistrict
- Location in Zhejiang
- Coordinates: 29.3024°N 120.3311°E
- Country: People's Republic of China
- Autonomous region: Zhejiang
- Prefecture-level city: Jinhua
- County-level city: Dongyang
- Time zone: UTC+8 (China Standard)

Liushi Subdistrict (Chinese: 六石街道; pinyin: Liùshí Jiēdào) is a subdistrict in Dongyang, Jinhua, Zhejiang, China. As of 2018, it has one residential community and 22 villages under its administration.

== See also ==
- List of township-level divisions of Zhejiang
