= Liushi Township =

Liushi Township 六市乡
- Township
- Location in Jiangxi Liushi Township (China)
- Coordinates: 27°22′45″N 113°54′10″E
- Country: People's Republic of China
- Province: Jiangxi
- Prefecture-level city: Pingxiang
- County: Lianhua County
- Time zone: UTC+8 (China Standard)

Liushi Township (simplified Chinese: 六市乡; traditional Chinese: 六市鄉; pinyin: Liùshì Xiāng) is a township under the administration of Lianhua County, Jiangxi, China. As of 2018, it has 8 villages and one reclamation farm community under its administration.
