= Dongyang wood carving =

Chinese art form

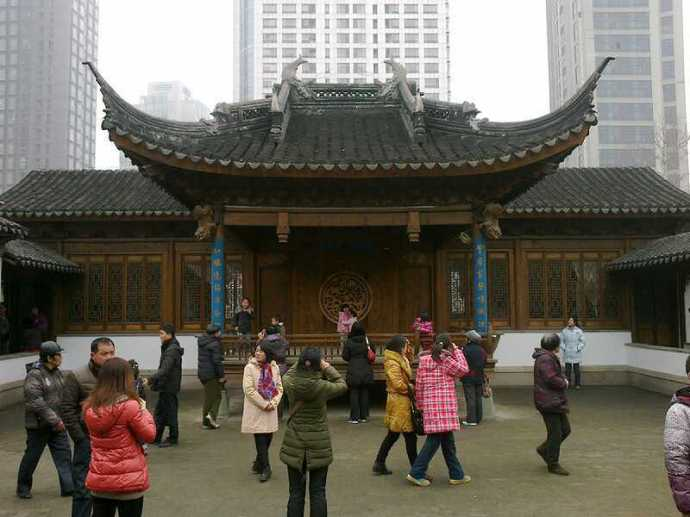

Dongyang wood carving (Chinese: 东阳木雕) is a traditional form of Chinese art originating from the city of Dongyang in Zhejiang Province, China. This art form is known for its intricate designs, delicate craftsmanship, and attention to detail. Dongyang wood carving dates back over 1,300 years, and in 2006, the Chinese government recognized it as a National Intangible Cultural Heritage.

== History ==
Dongyang wood carving can be traced back to the Tang dynasty (618–907 AD), but it reached its peak during the Ming (1368–1644) and Qing (1644–1911) dynasties. The city of Dongyang emerged as a hub for wood carving due to its abundance of high-quality wood resources and a favorable climate that allowed for skilled craftsmanship. Over time, the art form evolved into various regional styles.

During the Ming Dynasty, the printing industry relied on engraving, and the carving skills of Dongyang wood carvers were widely used in the printing and dyeing industry, as well as the printing industry. This formed a skilled plate-making team that specialized in engraving and printing books.

In the late Qing Dynasty, wood carvers moved from door-to-door processing to workshop production. After the Revolution of 1911, Dongyang wood carving became a commodity. Crafts and furniture made by wood carving artists were bought and exported to Hong Kong, the United States, Nanyang, and other places by businessmen, forming the heyday of Dongyang wood carving products.

== Artistic expression ==
Dongyang wood carving artistic expression is notable for its carving techniques, materials, color, and paste technology. The carving techniques include plane relief, multi-level relief, scatter perspective composition, and plane decoration. Its carving techniques also include thin relief, shallow relief, deep relief, hollow carving, transparent carving (saw hollow carving), high relief, multi-layer carving, garden wood relief, round carving, semi-round carving, colored wood inlaid carving, patch carving, Yin carving, colored wood multi-layer carving, and more than ten other techniques.

Dongyang wood carvings use light-colored woods such as camphor, basswood, poplar, birch, peach, nanmu, beech, and ginkgo for carving properties and low color. However, darker woods such as mahogany, ebony, sour branch wood, rosewood, iron pear wood, and shade wood may also be selected to enhance the visual impact and artistic expression of the work.

Dongyang wood carving is also called "white wood carving." However, some carvings use a variety of colors to create a sense of hierarchy and a three-dimensional effect. Scattered perspective composition and plane relief sometimes make it necessary to carve the pieces separately and then connect them using a paste technique. The carved pieces are combined after being carved separately and then pasted onto the bottom plate. This technique allows for greater detail and complexity.
