= Urine therapy =

Various applications of human urine as ineffective and dangerous medical treatments

Alternative medicine
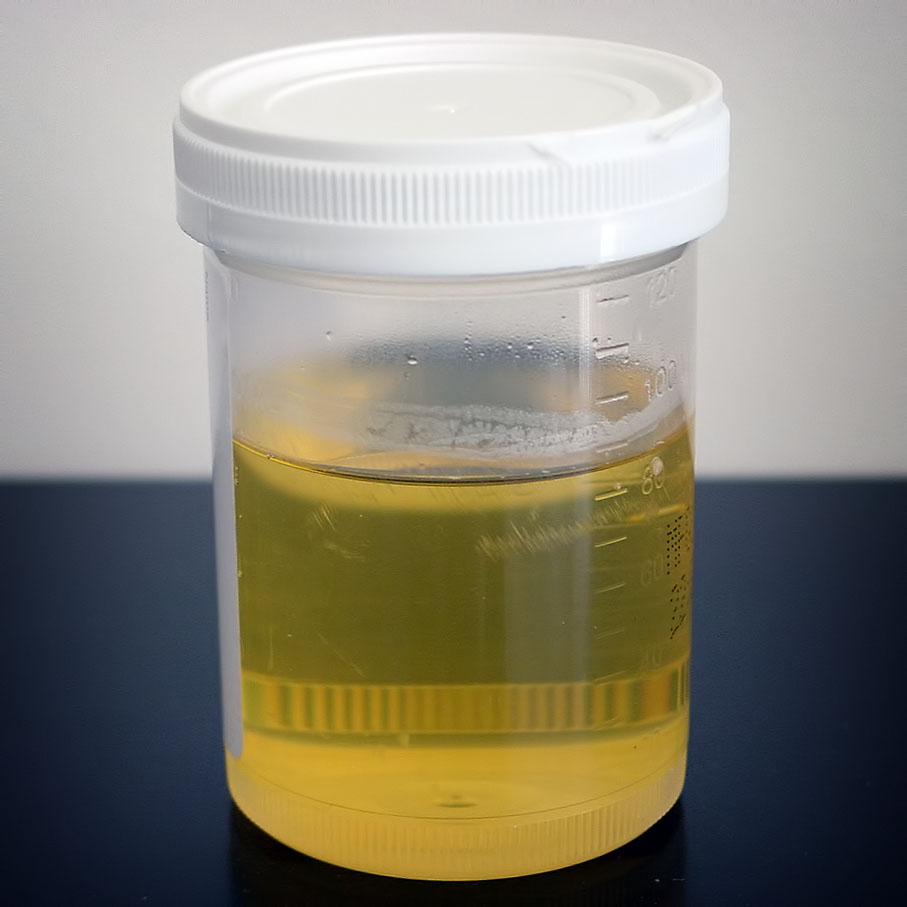
- A sample of human urine
- Claims: Various therapeutic uses of urine.
- Related fields: Naturopathy

Urine therapy or urotherapy, (also urinotherapy, Shivambu, (Note: Sanskrit: शिवाम्बु, romanized: Śivambu) uropathy, or auto-urine therapy) in alternative medicine, and amaroli in medieval hatha yoga, is the application of human urine for medicinal or cosmetic purposes, including drinking of one's own urine and massaging one's skin, or gums, with one's own urine. No scientific evidence exists to support any beneficial health claims of urine therapy.

== History ==
Though urine has been believed useful for diagnostic and therapeutic purposes in several traditional systems, (Note: Urine was recommended for whitening teeth in ancient Rome. Islamic legist Abu Yusuf allowed for use of camel urine for medicinal purposes. It has also been used in some traditional remedies in Mexico and in Nigeria.) and mentioned in some medical texts, (Note: Such as Solomon's English Physician published in 1665, One thousand notable remedies published in early-nineteenth century, and A Dictionary of Practical Materia Medica published in 1902.) auto-urine therapy as a system of alternative medicine was popularized by British naturopath John W. Armstrong in the early 20th century. Armstrong was inspired by his family's practice of using urine to treat minor stings and toothaches, by a metaphorical misreading of the Hebrew Biblical Proverb 5:15 "Drink waters out of thine own cistern, and running waters out of thine own well", and his own experience with ill-health that he treated with a 45-day fast "on nothing but urine and tap water". Starting in 1918, Armstrong prescribed urine therapy regimens that he devised for thousands of patients, and in 1944 he published The Water of Life: A Treatise on Urine Therapy, which became a founding document of the field.

Armstrong's book sold widely, and in India inspired the writing of Manav mootra (Gujarati: Urine therapy; 1959) by Gandhian social reformer Raojibhai Manibhai Patel, and many later works. These works often reference Shivambu Kalpa, a treatise on the pharmaceutical value of urine, as a source of the practice in the East. (Note: Shivambu Kalpa (lit. "water of Shiva") is said to be a section of the larger work Ḍamara Tantra, which is described by practitioners of urine therapy as "belong to the Puranic age". According to Joseph Alter the 107-shloka Kalpa is not well attested or in wide circulation, and is most easily accessible through modern Indian books on urine therapy, where it is often attached as an appendix.) They also cite passing references to properties and uses of urine in Yogic-texts such as Vayavaharasutra by Bhadrabahu and Hatha Yoga Pradapika by Svatmarama; and Ayurvedic texts such as Sushruta Samhita, Bhava Prakasha and Harit. However, according to medical anthropologist Joseph Alter, the practices of sivambu (drinking one's own urine) and amaroli recommended by modern Indian practitioners of urine therapy are closer to the ones propounded by Armstrong than traditional ayurveda or yoga, or even the practices described in Shivambu Kalpa.

Urine therapy has also been combined with other forms of alternative medicine.

It was used by ancient Roman dentists to whiten teeth.

== Modern claims and findings ==
An exhaustive description of the composition of human urine was prepared for NASA in 1971. Urine is an aqueous solution of greater than 95% water. The remaining constituents are, in order of decreasing concentration: urea 9.3 g/L, chloride 1.87 g/L, sodium 1.17 g/L, potassium 0.750 g/L, creatinine 0.670 g/L and other dissolved ions, inorganic and organic compounds.

In China there is a Urine Therapy Association which claims thousand of members.

According to a BBC report, a Thai doctor promoting urine therapy said that Thai people had been practicing urophagia for a long time, but according to the Department of Thai Traditional and Alternative Medicine, there was no record of the practice. In 2022, Thawee Nanra, a self-proclaimed holy man from Thailand, was arrested by police; his followers were observed consuming his urine and feces which they believed to have healing properties.

Urinating on jellyfish stings is a common "folk remedy". This does not help with jellyfish stings, and can be counterproductive, activating nematocysts remaining at the site of the sting, making the pain worse. This is because nematocysts are triggered by the change in the concentration of solutes (e.g. salt), such as when freshwater or similarly-composed urine is applied to the site. The myth originated from the false idea that ammonia, urea, and other compounds in urine could break down the nematocysts: however, urine is much too low in concentration to have those effects.

Urine and urea have been claimed by some practitioners to have an anti-cancer effect, and urotherapy has been offered along with other forms of alternative therapy in some cancer clinics in Mexico. No well-controlled studies support this, and available scientific evidence does not support this theory.

In the Arabian Peninsula, bottled camel urine is sold by vendors as prophetic medicine. In 2015, Saudi police arrested a man for selling supposed "camel urine" that was actually his own.

In January 2022, Christopher Key, a spreader of COVID-19 misinformation, claimed that urine therapy is the antidote to the COVID-19 pandemic. Key also falsely claimed that a 9-month research trial on urine therapy had been conducted. There is no scientific evidence supporting urine therapy as a cure for COVID-19.

Urea-containing creams are sold commercially for topical use, and contain synthetically produced urea rather than being derived from urine. Urea in very high concentrations is effective as a humectant and a keratolytic. Actual urine is too dilute to work well for this purpose.

== Health concerns ==
There is no scientific evidence of therapeutic use for untreated urine.

According to the American Cancer Society, "available scientific evidence does not support claims that urine or urea given in any form is helpful for cancer patients".

In 2016, the Chinese Urine Therapy Association was included on a list of illegal organizations by China's Ministry of Civil Affairs. However, the Municipal Bureau of Civil Affairs in Wuhan said they had no jurisdiction over the association.

== See also ==
- Conjugated estrogens, a hormone therapy medication manufactured by purification from horse urine
- Fecal microbiota transplant
- List of topics characterized as pseudoscience
- List of unproven and disproven cancer treatments
- Panchgavya, one of several uses of cow urine in Ayurveda
- Urea-containing cream
- Urinalysis, tests performed on urine for diagnostic purposes
- Virgin boy egg, a traditional dish of Dongyang, Zhejiang, China in which eggs are boiled in the urine of young boys
