= Diving at the 2022 Asian Games =

- Venue: Hangzhou Olympic Expo Aquatics Center
- Dates: 30 September – 4 October 2023
- Competitors: 65 from 13 nations

Diving at the 2022 Asian Games was held at Hangzhou Olympic Sports Park Aquatics Center in Hangzhou Olympic Expo Center, Hangzhou, China, from 30 September to 4 October 2023.

== Schedule ==
| P | Preliminary | F | Final |

| Event↓/Date → | 30th Sat | 1st Sun | 2nd Mon | 3rd Tue | | 4th Wed | |
|---|---|---|---|---|---|---|---|
| Men's 1 m springboard | | | F | | | | |
| Men's 3 m springboard | | | | P | F | | |
| Men's 10 m platform | | | | | | P | F |
| Men's synchronized 3 m springboard | F | | | | | | |
| Men's synchronized 10 m platform | | F | | | | | |
| Women's 1 m springboard | | | F | | | | |
| Women's 3 m springboard | | | | | | P | F |
| Women's 10 m platform | | | | P | F | | |
| Women's synchronized 3 m springboard | | F | | | | | |
| Women's synchronized 10 m platform | F | | | | | | |

== Medalists ==
=== Men ===
| Event | Gold | Silver | Bronze |
|---|---|---|---|
| 1 m springboard | Wang Zongyuan; China | Peng Jianfeng; China | Woo Ha-ram; South Korea |
| 3 m springboard | Wang Zongyuan; China | Zheng Jiuyuan; China | Yi Jae-gyeong; South Korea |
| 10 m platform | Yang Hao; China | Bai Yuming; China | Rikuto Tamai; Japan |
| Synchronized 3 m springboard | China; Yan Siyu; He Chao | South Korea; Yi Jae-gyeong; Woo Ha-ram | Malaysia; Syafiq Puteh; Ooi Tze Liang |
| Synchronized 10 m platform | China; Yang Hao; Lian Junjie | South Korea; Yi Jae-gyeong; Kim Yeong-nam | Malaysia; Bertrand Rhodict Lises; Enrique Maccartney Harold |

=== Women ===
| Event | Gold | Silver | Bronze |
|---|---|---|---|
| 1 m springboard | Li Yajie; China | Lin Shan; China | Kim Su-ji; South Korea |
| 3 m springboard | Chen Yiwen; China | Chang Yani; China | Sayaka Mikami; Japan |
| 10 m platform | Quan Hongchan; China | Chen Yuxi; China | Pandelela Rinong; Malaysia |
| Synchronized 3 m springboard | China; Chen Yiwen; Chang Yani | Malaysia; Ng Yan Yee; Nur Dhabitah Sabri | South Korea; Park Ha-reum; Kim Su-ji |
| Synchronized 10 m platform | China; Quan Hongchan; Chen Yuxi | Japan; Matsuri Arai; Minami Itahashi | Malaysia; Nur Dhabitah Sabri; Pandelela Rinong |

== Medal table ==
| Rank | Nation | Gold | Silver | Bronze | Total |
|---|---|---|---|---|---|
| 1 | China (CHN) | 10 | 6 | 0 | 16 |
| 2 | South Korea (KOR) | 0 | 2 | 4 | 6 |
| 3 | Malaysia (MAS) | 0 | 1 | 4 | 5 |
| 4 | Japan (JPN) | 0 | 1 | 2 | 3 |
| Totals (4 entries) | | 10 | 10 | 10 | 30 |

== Participating nations ==
A total of 65 athletes from 13 nations competed in diving at the 2022 Asian Games:

- China (14)
- Hong Kong (3)
- India (2)
- Indonesia (1)
- Iran (1)
- Japan (7)
- Kazakhstan (2)
- Macau (5)
- Malaysia (11)
- Singapore (4)
- South Korea (9)
- Thailand (4)
- Uzbekistan (2)
