= Malaysia at the 2022 Asian Games =

- IOC code: MAS
- NOC: Olympic Council of Malaysia

in Hangzhou, China 23 September – 8 October 2023
- Competitors: 289 in 22 sports
- Flag bearers: Muhammad Shah Firdaus Sahrom; Sivasangari Subramaniam
- Medals Ranked 14th: Gold 6 Silver 8 Bronze 18 Total 32

Asian Games appearances (overview)
- 1954; 1958; 1962; 1966; 1970; 1974; 1978; 1982; 1986; 1990; 1994; 1998; 2002; 2006; 2010; 2014; 2018; 2022; 2026

Other related appearances
- North Borneo (1954, 1958, 1962); Sarawak (1962)

Malaysia competed in the 2022 Asian Games in Hangzhou, China. The event was originally scheduled from 10 to 25 September 2022. However, due to COVID-19 pandemic cases rising in China, the event was postponed and rescheduled to 23 September to 8 October 2023.

== Background ==
=== Preparation ===
Dato' Chong Kim Fatt, President of the Wushu Federation of Malaysia (WFM), was appointed as the chef-de-mission of the delegation on 25 September 2021 during the 198th Olympic Council of Malaysia (OCM) Executive Council meeting which was held on virtual basis.

On 29 December 2021, the OCM Selection Committee under the Chairmanship of OCM President Tan Sri Dato’ Sri Mohamad Norza Zakaria held a meeting to discuss the selection criteria for the 2022 Asian Games and decided that:

- For Category A, athletes and teams will have to be in the top 4;
- For Category B, athletes and teams will have to be in the top 8 (reduced from top 16 due to tightened criteria); And,
- The Committee will utilise competitions from 2018 to May 2022, including 2021 Southeast Asian Games as basis for selection.

During the announcement ceremony for the Malaysian Delegation to the Games on Wednesday, 6 September 2023 at the AC Hotel by Marriot Kuala Lumpur, President of OCM, Mohamad Norza Zakaria handed over the instruments of selection certificates to representatives of the 289 athletes and 145 officials from 22 sports to symbolise their selection for the event, as well as appointing Track Cyclist Muhammad Shah Firdaus Sahrom and Squash athlete, Sivasangari Subramaniam, as the Contingent’s Flag bearers for the Opening Ceremony of the Asian Games and the Malaysia Boxing Federation (MBF) President, Datuk Mohamad Iruan Zulkefli and former Gymnast, Farrah Hani Imran as Deputy Chefs de Mission.

=== Target and achievement ===
During a press conference after the Flag Handing Ceremony for the Malaysian Delegation on Monday, 11 September 2023 at the Banquet Hall, Casa 4, National Sports Council of Malaysia (NSC) Headquarters in KL Sports City, Bukit Jalil, Dato’ Chong Kim Fatt announced a target of winning 27 medals, potentially contributed by 13 sports namely Aquatics (Diving), Archery, Athletics, Badminton, Track Cycling, Equestrian, E-Sports, Men’s Hockey, Karate, Sailing, Sepaktakraw, Squash and Wushu, without stating the specified gold medal target. He stated that this approach was meant to reduce pressure on the athletes and based on input from various stakeholders during post-mortem sessions conducted after previous Multi-Sport Games, as well as feedback from the Nippon Sports Science University (Nittaidai) in Japan, which has forged a close collaboration with the National Sports Council.

=== Broadcasters ===
Name	Type	Ref
RTM	Free-to-air and over-the-top	
Astro	Pay and over-the-top	

== Competitors ==
The following is a list of the number of competitors representing Malaysia that will participate at the Asian Games:

Sport	Men	Women	Total
Archery ()	8	5	13
Athletics ()	10	9	19
Badminton ()	10	8	18
Basketball ()	4	4	8
Boxing ()	2	0	2
Cricket ()	15	15	30
Cycling ()	7	6	13
Diving ()	7	5	12
Dragon boat ()	14	0	14
Equestrian ()	2	0	2
Esports ()	19	0	19
Field hockey ()	18	18	36
Go ()	5	4	9
Gymnastics ()	1	1	2
Ju-jitsu ()	1	1	2
Kabaddi ()	12	0	12
Karate ()	4	5	9
Rugby sevens ()	12	0	12
Sailing ()	4	3	7
Sepak takraw ()	12	0	12
Shooting ()	4	6	10
Squash ()	4	4	8
Swimming ()	7	1	8
Taekwondo ()	1	1	2
Wushu ()	4	3	7
Xiangqi ()	2	1	3
Total	189	100	289

== Medal summary ==
=== Medal by sport ===
Medals by sport
Sport	1st place, gold medalist(s)	2nd place, silver medalist(s)	3rd place, bronze medalist(s)	Total
Archery	0	0	1	1
Athletics	0	0	3	3
Badminton	0	0	1	1
Cycling – Track	0	0	4	4
Diving	0	1	4	5
Equestrian	1	0	0	1
Esports	0	1	1	2
Gymnastics – Artistic	0	0	1	1
Karate	1	2	0	3
Sailing	1	0	2	3
Sepak takraw	0	2	0	2
Squash	3	1	1	5
Wushu	0	1	0	1
Total	6	8	18	32

=== Medal by date ===
Medals by date
Day	Date	1st place, gold medalist(s)	2nd place, silver medalist(s)	3rd place, bronze medalist(s)	Total
1	24 September	0	0	0	0
2	25 September	0	0	0	0
3	26 September	0	2	2	4
4	27 September	1	0	2	3
5	28 September	1	0	1	2
6	29 September	0	1	2	3
7	30 September	1	0	5	6
8	1 October	0	1	1	2
9	2 October	0	0	1	1
10	3 October	0	0	2	2
11	4 October	0	0	0	0
12	5 October	2	2	1	5
13	6 October	0	1	0	1
14	7 October	1	1	1	3
15	8 October	0	0	0	0
Total		6	8	18	32

=== Medallists ===
No.	Medal	Name	Sport	Event	Date
1	Gold	Nur Shazrin Mohd Latif	Sailing	Women's Dinghy – ILCA6	27 September
2	Gold	Qabil Ambak; Horse: Rosenstolz	Equestrian – Dressage	Individual	28 September
3	Gold	Aifa Azman; Aira Azman; Rachel Arnold; Sivasangari Subramaniam	Squash	Women's Team	30 September
4	Gold	Sivasangari Subramaniam	Squash	Women's Singles	5 October
5	Gold	Ng Eain Yow	Squash	Men's Singles	5 October
6	Gold	Muhammad Arif Afifuddin Bin Abdul Malik	Karate	Men's Kumite – -84 kg	7 October
1	Silver	Tan Cheong Min	Wushu – Taolu	Women's Nanquan & Nandao All-Around	26 September
2	Silver	Chong Han Hui; Eng Jun Hao; Lai Chia Chien; Nicholas Ng Khai Shuan; Ong Jun Yang; Yong Zhan Quan	Esports	Arena of Valor	26 September
3	Silver	Aidil Aiman bin Azwawi; Amirul Zazwan bin Amir; Farhan bin Adam; Mohammad Azlan bin Alias; Mohammad Syahir bin Mohd Rosdi; Mohd Khairol Zaman bin Hamir Akhbar; Muhammad Afifuddin bin Mohd Razali; Muhammad Hairul Hazizi bin Haidzir; Muhammad Haziq bin Hairul Nizam; Muhamad Noraizat bin Mohd Nordin; Muhammad Zaim bin Razali; Muhammad Zarif bin Marican	Sepak takraw	Men's Team Regu	29 September
4	Silver	Nur Dhabitah Sabri; Ng Yan Yee	Aquatics – Diving	Women's Synchronised 3m Springboard	1 October
5	Silver	Mohd Syafiq Kamal; Aifa Azman	Squash	Mixed Doubles	5 October
6	Silver	Lovelly Anne Robberth	Karate	Women's Individual Kata	5 October
7	Silver	Lovelly Anne Robberth; Madhuri Poovanesan; Naccy Nelly Evvaferra; Niathalia Sherawinnie	Karate	Women's Team Kata	6 October
8	Silver	Amirul Zazwan bin Amir; Mohammad Azlan bin Alias; Mohammad Syahir bin Mohd Rosdi; Mohd Khairol Zaman bin Hamir Akhbar; Muhammad Zarif bin Marican	Sepak takraw	Men's Regu	7 October
1	Bronze	Anis Amira Rosidi; Nurul Aliana Syafika Azizan; Nurul Izzah Izzati Mohd Asri	Cycling – Track	Women's Team Sprint	26 September
2	Bronze	Fadhil Zonis; Muhammad Ridwan Sahrom; Umar Hasbullah	Cycling – Track	Men's Team Sprint	26 September
3	Bronze	Muhammad Asnawi Iqbal Adam	Sailing	Boy's Dinghy – ILCA4	27 September (Note: The medalist(s) were determined on 26 September.)
4	Bronze	Tengku Nurani Ezaty Tengku Khairudeen	Sailing	Women's Windsurfer RS:X – RS:X	27 September
5	Bronze	Muhammad Shah Firdaus Sahrom	Cycling – Track	Men's Sprint	28 September
6	Bronze	Muhammad Sharul Aimy	Gymnastics – Artistic	Men's Vault	29 September
7	Bronze	Muhammad Shah Firdaus Sahrom	Cycling – Track	Men's Keirin	29 September
8	Bronze	Addeen Idrakie; Ivan Yuen; Mohd Syafiq Kamal; Ng Eain Yow	Squash	Men's Team	30 September (Note: The medalist(s) were determined on 29 September.)
9	Bronze	Nur Dhabitah Sabri; Pandelela Rinong	Aquatics – Diving	Women's Synchronised 10m Platform	30 September
10	Bronze	Shereen Samson Vallabouy	Athletics	Women's 400m	30 September
11	Bronze	Muhammad Syafiq Puteh; Ooi Tze Liang	Aquatics – Diving	Men's Synchronised 3m Springboard	30 September
12	Bronze	Muhd Azeem Fahmi	Athletics	Men's 100m	30 September
13	Bronze	Bertrand Rhodict Lises; Enrique Maccartney Harold	Aquatics – Diving	Men's Synchronised 10m Platform	1 October
14	Bronze	Chan Kok Hong; Cheng Jin Xiang; Ng Wei Poong; Thiay Jun Wen; Tue Soon Chuan; Yap Jian Wei	Esports	Dota 2	2 October
15	Bronze	Pandelela Rinong	Aquatics – Diving	Women's 10m Platform	3 October
16	Bronze	Azreen Nabila Alias; Zaidatul Husniah Zulkifli; Nur Afrina Batrisyia; Shereen Samson Vallabouy	Athletics	Women's 4x100m Relay	3 October
17	Bronze	Alang Ariff Aqil Muhammad Ghazalli; Mohd Juwaidi Mazuki; Mohamad Syafiq Md Ariffin	Archery	Compound – Men's Team	5 October
18	Bronze	Aaron Chia; Soh Wooi Yik	Badminton	Men's Doubles	7 October

=== Multiple medallists ===
Name	Medal	Sport	Event
Sivasangari Subramaniam	Gold; Gold	Squash	Women's Singles; Women's Team
Aifa Azman	Gold; Silver	Squash	Women's Team; Mixed Doubles
Ng Eain Yow	Gold; Bronze	Squash	Men's Singles; Men's Team
Lovelly Anne Robberth	Silver; Silver	Karate	Women's Kata; Women's Team Kata
Amirul Zazwan bin Amir; Mohammad Azlan bin Alias; Mohammad Syahir bin Mohd Rosdi; Mohd Khairol Zaman bin Hamir Akhbar; Muhammad Zarif bin Marican	Silver; Silver	Sepak takraw	Men's Team Regu; Men's Regu
Mohd Syafiq Kamal	Silver; Bronze	Squash	Mixed Doubles; Men's Team
Nur Dhabitah Sabri	Silver; Bronze	Aquatics – Diving	Women's Synchronised 3m Springboard; Women's Synchronised 10m Platform
Muhammad Shah Firdaus Sahrom	Bronze; Bronze	Cycling – Track	Men's Keirin; Men's Sprint
Pandelela Rinong	Bronze; Bronze	Aquatics – Diving	Women's 10m Platform; Women's Synchronised 10m Platform
Shereen Samson Vallabouy	Bronze; Bronze	Athletics	Women's 400m Women's 4x100m Relay

== 3x3 Basketball ==
Athlete	Event	Group Stage				Qualifications	Quarterfinal	Semifinal	Final / BM	
Athlete	Event	Opposition Score	Opposition Score	Opposition Score	Rank	Opposition Score	Opposition Score	Opposition Score	Opposition Score	Rank
De Wee Yiang; Lai Kok Weng; Lee Jia Jun; Lim Wan Seong	Men's tournament	India; L 16–20	China; L 5–21	Macau; L 17–21	4	Did not advance				
Foo Suet Ying; Sammi Tan; Tan Sin Jie; Tan Yin Jie	Women's tournament	Maldives; W 15–12	Thailand; W 14–11	South Korea; L 8–12	2 Q	India; L 6–16	Did not advance			

== Archery ==
=== Recurve ===
Athlete	Event	Qualification		Round of 32	Round of 16	Round of 8	Quarterfinal	Semifinal	Final / BM	
Athlete	Event	Score	Rank	Opposition Score	Opposition Score	Opposition Score	Opposition Score	Opposition Score	Opposition Score	Rank
Khairul Anuar Mohamad	Men's individual	641	42 Q	Al-Musa (KSA); W 7–1	A Das (IND); L 4–6	Did not advance				
Muhammad Danish Amsyar Norazlan	Men's individual	632	55	Did not advance						
Muhammad Syafiq Busthamin	Men's individual	639	44	Did not advance						
Muhamad Zarif Syahiir Zolkepeli	Men's individual	642	41 Q	Al-Ketbi (UAE); W 6–2	R Shabani (IRI); L 0–6	Did not advance				
Ku Nurin Afiqah Ku Ruzaini	Women's individual	626	31 Q	Al-Marshud (KSA); W 6–0	Murat (KAZ); W 6–5	S Noda (JPN); L 4–6	Did not advance			
Nur Ain Ayuni Fozi	Women's individual	585	58	Did not advance						
Nurul Izzah Binti Mazlan	Women's individual	600	51	Did not advance						
Syaqiera Mashayikh	Women's individual	639	20 Q	Hamoud (YEM); W 6–0	Ilyassova (KAZ); W 6–0	Hai LG (CHN); L 3–7	Did not advance			
Khairul Anuar Mohamad; Muhamad Zarif Syahiir Zolkepeli; Muhammad Syafiq Busthamin	Men's team	1922	12 Q	—N/a		Indonesia; L 3–5	Did not advance			
Ku Nurin Afiqah Ku Ruzaini; Nurul Izzah Binti Mazlan; Syaqiera Mashayikh	Women's team	1865	8 Q	—N/a		Indonesia; L 2–6	Did not advance			
Ku Nurin Afiqah Ku Ruzaini; Muhamad Zarif Syahiir Zolkepeli	Mixed team	1281	12 Q	—N/a		India; L 2–6	Did not advance			

=== Compound ===
Athlete	Event	Qualification		Round of 32	Round of 16	Round of 8	Quarterfinal	Semifinal	Final / BM	
Athlete	Event	Score	Rank	Opposition Score	Opposition Score	Opposition Score	Opposition Score	Opposition Score	Opposition Score	Rank
Alang Ariff Aqil Muhammad Ghazalli	Men's individual	699	12 Q	Bye	Khendrup (BHU); W 146–138	Yang J-w (KOR); L 145–149	Did not advance			
Mohamad Syafiq Md Ariffin	Men's individual	693	22	Did not advance						
Mohd Juwaidi Mazuki	Men's individual	702	9 Q	Bye	Woon T N (SGP); W 146–145	Dorji (BHU); W 147–146	Joo J-h (KOR); L 135–148	Did not advance		
Wong Co Wan	Men's individual	680	44	Did not advance						
Fatin Nurfatehah Mat Salleh	Women's individual	674	27 Q	Bye	Maneesombatkul (THA); L 140–141	Did not advance				
Alang Ariff Aqil Muhammad Ghazalli; Mohd Juwaidi Mazuki; Mohamad Syafiq Md Ariffin	Men's team	2094	5 Q	—N/a		Bangladesh; W 231–229	Iran; W 227–221	South Korea; L 230–232	Chinese Taipei; W 228–208	3rd place, bronze medalist(s)
Fatin Nurfatehah Mat Salleh; Mohd Juwaidi Mazuki	Mixed team	1376	8 Q	—N/a		Singapore; W 158–151	India; L 155–158	Did not advance		

== Athletics ==
Men

Athlete	Event	Qualification		Semifinal		Final	
Athlete	Event	Time / Score	Rank	Time / Score	Rank	Time / Score	Rank
Khairul Hafiz Jantan	100 metres	10.48	19 Q	10.63	23	Did not advance	
Muhd Azeem Fahmi	100 metres	10.28	9 Q	10.17	6 Q	10.11	3rd place, bronze medalist(s)
Russel Alexander Nasir Taib	200 metres	21.31	13 q	21.53	14	Did not advance	
Umar Osman	400 metres	46.58	11	—N/a		Did not advance	
Khairul Hafiz Jantan; Muhammad Arsyad Md Saat; Jonathan Nyepa; Muhd Azeem Fahmi	4 x 100 metres relay	39.40 NR	4 Q	—N/a		DQ	
Irfan Shamsuddin	Discus throw	—N/a				58.94	6
Jackie Wong Siew Cheer	Hammer throw	—N/a				62.79	11
Andre Anura	Long jump	6.71	19	—N/a		Did not advance	
Andre Anura	Triple jump	—N/a				16.00	8

Women

Athlete	Event	Qualification		Final	
Athlete	Event	Time / Score	Rank	Time / Score	Rank
Zaidatul Husniah Zulkifli	100 metres	12.11	18	Did not advance	
Zaidatul Husniah Zulkifli	200 metres	24.86	14	Did not advance	
Shereen Samson Vallabouy	400 metres	52.89	5 Q	52.58	3rd place, bronze medalist(s)
Azreen Nabila Alias; Zaidatul Husniah Zulkifli; Nur Afrina Batrisyia; Shereen Samson Vallabouy	4 x 100 metres relay	—N/a		45.01 NR	3rd place, bronze medalist(s)
Queenie Ting Kung Ni	Discus throw	—N/a		49.00	7
Grace Wong Xiu Mei	Hammer throw	—N/a		57.46	10
Norliyana Kamaruddin	High jump	—N/a		1.65	13
Nor Sarah Adi	Pole vault	—N/a		NM	

== Badminton ==
Men

Athlete	Event	Round of 64	Round of 32	Round of 16	Quarter-finals	Semi-finals	Final	
Athlete	Event	Opposition Score	Opposition Score	Opposition Score	Opposition Score	Opposition Score	Opposition Score	Rank
Lee Zii Jia	Singles	Ng K L (HKG); W (15–21, 21–15, 21–16)	M Z Costa Gusmao De Jesus (TLS); W (21–0, 21–7)	K Vitidsarn (THA); W (10–21, 21–19, 21–6)	Prannoy H. S. (IND); L (16–21, 23–21, 20–22)	Did not advance		
Ng Tze Yong	Singles	Bye	Loh K Y (SGP); W (21–12, 21–14)	K Wangcharoen (THA); W (21–17, 21–12)	K Naraoka (JPN); L (20–22, 15–21)	Did not advance		
Aaron Chia; Soh Wooi Yik	Doubles	—N/a	Lu C-y / Yang P-h (TPE); W (21–23, 21–12, 23–21)	S Jomkoh / K Kedren (THA); W (21–12, 21–14)	Liu YC / Ou XY (CHN); W (21–18, 19–21, 21–18)	S Rankireddy / C Shetty (IND); L (17–21, 12–21)	Did not advance	3rd place, bronze medalist(s)
Ong Yew Sin; Teo Ee Yi	Doubles	—N/a	Lee Y / Wang C-l (TPE); L (16–21, 19–21)	Did not advance				
Lee Zii Jia; Ng Tze Yong; Aaron Chia; Ong Yew Sin; Soh Wooi Yik; Teo Ee Yi; Cheam June Wei; Leong Jun Hao; Chen Tang Jie; Goh Soon Huat	Team	—N/a		South Korea; L 1–3	Did not advance			

Women

Athlete	Event	Round of 64	Round of 32	Round of 16	Quarter-finals	Semi-finals	Final	
Athlete	Event	Opposition Score	Opposition Score	Opposition Score	Opposition Score	Opposition Score	Opposition Score	Rank
Goh Jin Wei	Singles	G Siddique (PAK); W (21–10, 21–4)	Vũ T A T (VIE); W (21–10, 21–13)	G M Tunjung (INA); L (6–21, 12–21)	Did not advance			
Letshanaa Karupathevan	Singles	Bye	B Ongbamrungphan (THA); L (13–21, 10–21)	Did not advance				
Pearly Tan; Thinaah Muralitharan	Doubles	—N/a	Jin YJ / C Wong (SGP); W (21–12, 21–16)	J Kititharakul / R Prajongjai (THA); W (21–15, 21–17)	Baek H-n / Lee S-h (KOR); L (21–15, 11–21, 7–21)	Did not advance		
Go Pei Kee; Valeree Siow	Doubles	—N/a	N Matsuyama / C Shida (JPN); L (9–21, 13–21)	Did not advance				

Mixed

Athlete	Event	Round of 32	Round of 16	Quarter-finals	Semi-finals	Final	
Athlete	Event	Opposition Score	Opposition Score	Opposition Score	Opposition Score	Opposition Score	Rank
Chen Tang Jie; Toh Ee Wei	Doubles	A Kwek / C Wong (SGP); W (21–17, 21–13)	K S Pratheek / T Crasto (IND); W (21–18, 21–18)	Zheng SW / Huang YQ (CHN); L (14–21, 21–23)	Did not advance		
Goh Soon Huat; Shevon Jemie Lai	Doubles	R Kapoor / S Reddy (IND); W (2–0^{r})	S Jomkoh / S Paewsampran (THA); L (21–17, 21–23, 13–21)	Did not advance			

== Boxing ==
Athlete	Event	1/32 Finals	1/16 Finals	Quarterfinals	Semifinals	Final	
Athlete	Event	Opposition Score	Opposition Score	Opposition Score	Opposition Score	Opposition Score	Rank
Muhammad Abdul Qaiyum Bin Ariffin	51 kg	Deepak (IND); L 0–5	Did not advance				
Mohamed Aswan Bin Che Azmi	71 kg	Bye	Taher (KUW); W RSC	Kan C-w (TPE); L 0–5	Did not advance		

== Cricket ==
Team	Event	Group stage			Quarterfinal	Semifinal	Final / BM	
Team	Event	Opposition Score	Opposition Score	Rank	Opposition Score	Opposition Score	Opposition Score	Rank
Malaysia men's	Men's tournament	Singapore; W 160/8 (20 overs) – 87/10 (17.5 overs)	Thailand; W 268/4 (20 overs) – 74/9 (20 overs)	1 Q	Bangladesh; L 114/8 (20 overs) – 116/5 (20 overs)	Did not advance		6
Malaysia women's	Women's tournament	Hong Kong; W 104/9 (20 overs) – 82/10 (20 overs)	—N/a	—N/a	India; L 1/0 (0.2 overs) – 173/2 (15 overs); Rainout	Did not advance		5

== Cycling ==
=== Road ===
Athlete	Event	Final	
Athlete	Event	Time	Rank
Nur Aisyah Mohamad Zubir	Women's road race	3:36:07	11
Phi Kun Pan	Women's road race	3:36:07	20

=== Track ===
Men

Athlete	Event	Qualifying		First Round / Round of 16				Round of 8				Quarterfinals		Semifinals		Finals / BM / Pl.	
Athlete	Event	Time	Rank	Time	Rank	Repechage	Rank	Time	Rank	Repechage	Rank	Time	Rank	Time	Rank	Time/Score	Rank
Fadhil Zonis	Keirin	—N/a		+1.022	6 R	+0.437	3 Q	—N/a						+0.543	6 Qf	+0.058	8
Muhammad Shah Firdaus Sahrom	Keirin	—N/a		10.085	1 Q	Bye		—N/a						10.334	1 Q	+1.481	3rd place, bronze medalist(s)
Muhammad Shah Firdaus Sahrom	Sprint	9.851	5 Q	10.492	1 Q	Bye		9.659	1 Q	Bye		9.500; 9.533	1 Q	REL +13.598	2 QB	10.076; 10.367	3rd place, bronze medalist(s)
Muhammad Ridwan Sahrom	Sprint	10.073	10 Q	10.163	1 Q	Bye		+0.308	2 R	9.880	1 Q	9.549 +0.042 +0.106	2 Qf	Did not advance		+0.104	7
Abdul Azim Aliyas	Omnium	—N/a														115	7
Abdul Azim Aliyas; Muhammad Yusri Shaari	Madison	—N/a														2	7
Fadhil Zonis; Muhammad Ridwan Sahrom; Umar Hasbullah	Team sprint	44.801	3 Q	44.929	4 QB	—N/a										44.165	3rd place, bronze medalist(s)

Women

Athlete	Event	Qualifying		First Round / Round of 16				Round of 8				Quarterfinals		Semifinals		Finals / BM / Pl.	
Athlete	Event	Time	Rank	Time	Rank	Repechage	Rank	Time	Rank	Repechage	Rank	Time	Rank	Time	Rank	Time/Score	Rank
Anis Amira Rosidi	Keirin	—N/a		+0.251	4 R	+0.159	3 Q	—N/a						+0.410	4 Qf	11.311	7
Anis Amira Rosidi	Sprint	11.194	7 Q	10.910	1 Q	Bye		11.890	1 Q	Bye		+2.668 +3.733	2 Qf	Did not advance		+0.114	7
Nurul Izzah Izzati Mohd Asri	Keirin	—N/a		+1.158	5 R	+0.075	2 Q	—N/a						+0.443	4 Qf	+0.086	8
Nurul Izzah Izzati Mohd Asri	Sprint	11.101	6 Q	10.980	1 Q	Bye		+0.305	2 R	11.621	1 Q	+0.959 +0.055	2 Qf	Did not advance		11.606	5
Anis Amira Rosidi; Nurul Aliana Syafika Azizan; Nurul Izzah Izzati Mohd Asri	Team sprint	49.937	3 Q	49.466	3 QB	—N/a										49.025	3rd place, bronze medalist(s)

== Diving ==
Men

Athlete	Event	Preliminary		Final	
Athlete	Event	Score	Rank	Score	Rank
Hanis Nazirul Jaya Surya	1m springboard	—N/a	—N/a	296.15	6
Enrique Maccartney Harold	1m springboard	—N/a	—N/a	DNS	
Muhammad Syafiq Puteh	3m springboard	366.35	6 Q	379.20	5
Ooi Tze Liang	3m springboard	324.20	8 Q	301.50	10
Bertrand Rhodict Lises	10m platform	401.05	5 Q	434.85	4
Jellson Jabillin	10m platform	423.70	4 Q	403.00	5
Muhammad Syafiq Puteh; Ooi Tze Liang	Synchronized 3m springboard	—N/a	—N/a	380.22	3rd place, bronze medalist(s)
Bertrand Rhodict Lises; Enrique Maccartney Harold	Synchronized 10m platform	—N/a	—N/a	386.07	3rd place, bronze medalist(s)

Women

Athlete	Event	Preliminary		Final	
Athlete	Event	Score	Rank	Score	Rank
Ong Ker Ying	1m springboard	—N/a	—N/a	219.45	7
Nur Dhabitah Sabri	1m springboard	—N/a	—N/a	261.85	4
Nur Dhabitah Sabri	3m springboard	DNS		Did not advance	
Kimberly Bong	3m springboard	239.20	6 Q	247.20	6
Pandelela Rinong	10m platform	239.35	6 Q	280.50	3rd place, bronze medalist(s)
Nur Dhabitah Sabri; Ng Yan Yee	Synchronized 3m springboard	—N/a	—N/a	270.27	2nd place, silver medalist(s)
Nur Dhabitah Sabri; Pandelela Rinong	Synchronized 10m platform	—N/a	—N/a	266.94	3rd place, bronze medalist(s)

== Dragon boat ==
Athlete	Event	Heat		Semifinal		GF / MF	
Athlete	Event	Time	Rank	Time	Rank	Time	Rank
Ahmad Amir Khan Bin Zainal Abidin Khan; Ahmad Ariff Bin Rasydan; Ahmad Azfaruddin Bin Lukman; Khairul Naim Bin Zainal; Mirza Adli Bin Shaharaziz; Mohamad Nazrin Bin Najib; Montoya Raw Anak Michael; Muhammad Adib Bin Kamaruzrizan; Muhammad Aiman Bin Zamberi; Muhammad Bahji Rabba Mohamad Rizal; Muhammad Nur Rahman Bin Abdullah; Muhammad Ridzuan Abdul Aziz; Muhammad Shahrin H Mohd Shahbireen; Nik Afiq Bin Nik Mazli	200m	52.739	11 Qsf	52.956	7 QM	52.832	9
Ahmad Amir Khan Bin Zainal Abidin Khan; Ahmad Ariff Bin Rasydan; Ahmad Azfaruddin Bin Lukman; Khairul Naim Bin Zainal; Mirza Adli Bin Shaharaziz; Mohamad Nazrin Bin Najib; Montoya Raw Anak Michael; Muhammad Adib Bin Kamaruzrizan; Muhammad Aiman Bin Zamberi; Muhammad Bahji Rabba Mohamad Rizal; Muhammad Nur Rahman Bin Abdullah; Muhammad Ridzuan Abdul Aziz; Muhammad Shahrin H Mohd Shahbireen; Nik Afiq Bin Nik Mazli	500m	2:14.539	8 Qsf	2:15.882	5 QM	2:15.363	8
Ahmad Amir Khan Bin Zainal Abidin Khan; Ahmad Ariff Bin Rasydan; Ahmad Azfaruddin Bin Lukman; Khairul Naim Bin Zainal; Mirza Adli Bin Shaharaziz; Mohamad Nazrin Bin Najib; Montoya Raw Anak Michael; Muhammad Adib Bin Kamaruzrizan; Muhammad Aiman Bin Zamberi; Muhammad Bahji Rabba Mohamad Rizal; Muhammad Nur Rahman Bin Abdullah; Muhammad Ridzuan Abdul Aziz; Muhammad Shahrin H Mohd Shahbireen; Nik Afiq Bin Nik Mazli	1000m	4:36.867	5 Qsf	4:42.420	5 QM	4:40.912	7

== Equestrian ==
Dressage

Athlete	Horse	Event	Prix St-Georges		Intermediate I		Intermediate I Freestyle	
Athlete	Horse	Event	Score (%)	Rank	Score (%)	Rank	Score (%)	Rank
Qabil Ambak	Rosenstolz	Individual	69.735	4 Q	72.706	2 Q	75.780	1st place, gold medalist(s)

Jumping

Athlete	Horse	Event	Qualifier				Final			
Athlete	Horse	Event	1		2		1		2	
Athlete	Horse	Event	Time (s)	Rank	Time (s)	Rank	Time (s)	Rank	Time (s)	Rank
Shoorendran Nageswaran	Wanskjaer Cuneo	Individual	88.48	48 Q	95.61	47 Q	84.66	9 Q	81.47	12

== Esports ==
Individual

Athlete	Event	Round of 32	WB / LB Round 1	WB / LB Round 2	WB / LB Round 3	LB Round 4	LB Round 5	LB Round 6	LB Round 7	WB / LB Final	Final	
Athlete	Event	Opposition Score	Opposition Score	Opposition Score	Opposition Score	Opposition Score	Opposition Score	Opposition Score	Opposition Score	Opposition Score	Opposition Score	Rank
Jerry Cheong	Street Fighter V: Champion Edition	T Homchuen (THA); W 2–1	M Kawano (JPN); L 1–2	R Alawadhi (UAE); W 2–0	B Chia (SGP); L 0–2	Did not advance						

Team

Athlete	Event	Group Stage			Quarterfinal	Semifinal	Final / BM	
Athlete	Event	Opposition Score	Opposition Score	Rank	Opposition Score	Opposition Score	Opposition Score	Rank
Chong Han Hui; Eng Jun Hao; Lai Chia Chien; Nicholas Ng Khai Shuan; Ong Jun Yang; Yong Zhan Quan	Arena of Valor	Bye			Hong Kong (HKG); W 2–0	Vietnam (VIE); W 2–0	China (CHN); L 0–2	2nd place, silver medalist(s)
Chan Kok Hong; Cheng Jin Xiang; Ng Wei Poong; Thiay Jun Wen; Tue Soon Chuan; Yap Jian Wei	Dota 2	Bye			Saudi Arabia (KSA); W 2–0	China (CHN); L 1–2	Kyrgyzstan (KGZ); W 2–0	3rd place, bronze medalist(s)
Alvin Lim Ming Siang; Ang Jing En; Lee Kaiwen; Lim Wei Lun; Lim Yew Siang; Tam See Kheing	League of Legends	Bye			Chinese Taipei (TPE); L 0–2	Did not advance		

== Go ==
Individual

Athlete	Event	Preliminary Rounds							Quarterfinal	Semifinal	Final	
Athlete	Event	Opposition Score	Opposition Score	Opposition Score	Opposition Score	Opposition Score	Opposition Score	Rank	Opposition Score	Opposition Score	Opposition Score	Rank
Chang Fu Kang	Men's individual	Ichiriki R (JPN); L 0–2	Lou W K (MAC); W 2–0	Lai J-f (TPE); L 0–2	Chan N S (HKG); L 0–2	Bye	Park J-h (KOR); L 0–2	8	Did not advance			
Lee Shou Kai	Men's individual	Hsu H-h (TPE); L 0–2	Bye	Shibano T (JPN); L 0–2	Kwa J H (SGP); L 0–2	Sam I H (MAC); L 0–2	Chan C H (HKG); L 0–2	9	Did not advance			

Team

Athlete	Event	Preliminary Rounds							Semifinal	Final	
Athlete	Event	Opposition Score	Opposition Score	Opposition Score	Opposition Score	Opposition Score	Opposition Score	Rank	Opposition Score	Opposition Score	Rank
Chang Fu Kang; Lee Shou Kai; Lee Shou Wei; Lee Shou Xuan; Leong Chee Weng; Owen Lo Chen Yeh	Men's team	Japan (JPN); L 0–2	Bye	Chinese Taipei (TPE); L 0–2	Hong Kong (HKG); L 0–2	China (CHN); L 0–2	Mongolia (MGL); W 2–0	8	Did not advance		
Chang Xin; Tan Hooi Yan; Tan Yan Ying; Yong Qing	Women's team	Hong Kong (HKG); L 0–2	Chinese Taipei (TPE); L 0–2	Mongolia (MGL); W 2–0	Thailand (THA); L 0–2	Japan (JPN); L 0–2	—N/a	7	Did not advance		

== Gymnastics ==
=== Artistic ===
Athlete	Event	Final	
Athlete	Event	Score	Rank
Muhammad Sharul Aimy	Men's vault	14.466	3rd place, bronze medalist(s)

=== Rhythmic ===
Athlete	Event	Qualification						Final					
Athlete	Event	Apparatus				Total	Rank	Apparatus				Total	Rank
Athlete	Event	Hoop	Ball	Clubs	Ribbon	Total	Rank	Hoop	Ball	Clubs	Ribbon	Total	Rank
Ng Joe Ee	Individual all-around	28.050	28.900	28.200	28.050	85.150	14 Q	28.800	31.550	27.700	28.200	116.250	11

== Field hockey ==
Summary

Key:

- A.E.T – After extra time.
- P – Match decided by penalty-shootout.

Team	Event	Group Stage						Quarterfinal	Semifinal	Final / BM / Pl	
Team	Event	Opposition Score	Opposition Score	Opposition Score	Opposition Score	Opposition Score	Rank	Opposition Score	Opposition Score	Opposition Score	Rank
Malaysia	Men's tournament	Thailand; W 9–0	Oman; W 11–1	Indonesia; W 9–2	South Korea; L 3–4	China; D 4–4	3	Did not advance		Pakistan; L 2–5	6
Malaysia	Women's tournament	Hong Kong; W 8–0	India; L 0–6	Singapore; W 8–1	South Korea; L 0–5	—N/a	3	Did not advance		Thailand; W 2–1	5

=== Men's tournament ===
Pool B

Pos	Team	Pld	W	D	L	GF	GA	GD	Pts	Qualification
1	China (H)	5	4	1	0	24	9	+15	13	Semi-finals
2	South Korea	5	4	0	1	42	8	+34	12	Semi-finals
3	Malaysia	5	3	1	1	36	11	+25	10	Fifth place game
4	Oman	5	2	0	3	14	35	−21	6	Seventh place game
5	Indonesia	5	1	0	4	7	28	−21	3	Ninth place game
6	Thailand	5	0	0	5	3	35	−32	0	Eleventh place game

Source: FIH
Rules for classification: 1) points; 2) matches won; 3) goal difference; 4) goals for; 5) head-to-head result; 6) field goals for.
(H) Hosts

24 September 2023
09:00

Malaysia	9–0	Thailand
Abu 8', 34'; Firhan 21'; Rozemi 30', 32'; Aminudin 43', 45+'; Hamirin 57'; Azahar 60'	Report

Umpires:
Raghu Prasad (IND)
Shahbaz Ali (BAN)

26 September 2023
11:15

Malaysia	11–1	Oman
Razie 3', 11'; Hamsani 14', 30', 34'; Silverius 18'; Faizal 26', 36'; Abu 29', 35'; Farizal 34'	Report	Al Lawati 23'

Umpires:
Jakub Mejzlik (CZE)
Kinoshita Hideki (JPN)

28 September 2023
15:45

Indonesia	2–9	Malaysia
Asasi 15'; Al Ardh 55'	Report	Hamsani 5'; Firhan 17'; Jazlan 19', 35'; Faizal 33'; Silverius 38'; Abu 42'; Razie 43'; Aminudin 48'

Umpires:
Hong-Zhen Lim (SGP)
Haroon Rashid (PAK)

30 September 2023
13:30

Malaysia	3–4	South Korea
Hamsani 5'; Faizal 30+'; Razie 44'	Report	Jang 11', 44'; Lee 32'; Yang 33'

Umpires:
Sean Rapaport (RSA)
Paul Walker (ENG)

2 October 2023
20:45

China	4–4	Malaysia
Gao 13'; Chen Q. 20'; Liu 36'; Zhu 43'	Report	Abu 18'; Hamsani 25'; Azahar 35'; Jali 40'

Umpires:
Sean Rapaport (RSA)
Haroon Rashid (PAK)

Fifth place game

6 October 2023
12:45

Pakistan	5–2	Malaysia
Ahmad 8'; Rehman 37'; Rana 51'; Ammad 53'; Afraz 59'	Report	Aminudin 5'; Razie 58'

Umpires:
You Hyo-Sik (KOR)
Kinoshita Hideki (JPN)

=== Women's tournament ===
Pool A

Pos	Team	Pld	W	D	L	GF	GA	GD	Pts	Qualification
1	India	4	3	1	0	33	1	+32	10	Semi-finals
2	South Korea	4	3	1	0	17	1	+16	10	Semi-finals
3	Malaysia	4	2	0	2	16	12	+4	6	Fifth place game
4	Singapore	4	1	0	3	2	25	−23	3	Seventh place game
5	Hong Kong	4	0	0	4	0	29	−29	0	Ninth place game

Source: FIH
Rules for classification: 1) points; 2) matches won; 3) goal difference; 4) goals for; 5) head-to-head result; 6) field goals for.

25 September 2023
12:45

Malaysia	8–0	Hong Kong
Sukri 10', 40'; Rashid 20'; Onn 21'; Husain 38'; Insyriah 56'; Azhar 60'; Saiuti 60'	Report

Umpires:
Cookie Tan (SGP)
Durga Devi (IND)

29 September 2023
18:30

Malaysia	0–6	India
	Report	Monika 7'; Grace 8'; Navneet 25'; Vaishnavi 15'; Sangita 24'; Lalremsiami 50'

Umpires:
Liu Xiaoying (CHN)
Tan Cookie (SGP)

1 October 2023
10:15

Singapore	1–8	Malaysia
S. Ng 34'	Report	Saiuti 9'; S. Mohd 15'; Rashid 29'; Syafi 31'; Azhar 37'; K. Mohd 48'; Onn 54', 59'

Umpires:
Chen Jianjun (CHN)
Tang Shi Him (HKG)

3 October 2023
12:45

Malaysia	0–5	South Korea
	Report	Cho E. 14'; An S. 25', 38'; Seo 36'; Lee Y. 48'

Umpires:
Chieko Soma (JPN)
Sophie Bockelmann (GER)

Fifth place game

7 October 2023
12:45

Malaysia	2–1	Thailand
Hanis 12'; Nuraini 56'	Report	Kunjira 5'

Umpires:
Kim Jung Hee (KOR)
Chen Jianjun (CHN)

== Ju-jitsu ==
Men

Athlete	Event	Round of 32	Round of 16	Quarterfinal	Semifinal	Final / BM	Rank
Athlete	Event	Opposition Score	Opposition Score	Opposition Score	Opposition Score	Opposition Score	Rank
Tee Lip Jin	-85 kg	Al-Quradaghi (QAT); W 4–0	Wei C C (TPE); L 0–50	Did not advance			

Women

Athlete	Event	Round of 32	Round of 16	Quarterfinal	Semifinal	Final / BM	Rank
Athlete	Event	Opposition Score	Opposition Score	Opposition Score	Opposition Score	Opposition Score	Rank
Cassandra J Poyong	-57 kg	Bye	O Senatham (THA); L 0–50	Did not advance			

== Kabaddi ==
Athlete	Event	Group stage				Semifinal	Final	
Athlete	Event	Opposition Score	Opposition Score	Opposition Score	Rank	Opposition Score	Opposition Score	Rank
Alif Asri Buang; Alexson Lian Sin; Devinthirakumaar Vijayan Kumaran; Dhaanushruban Raveechandran; Evaraj Velayutham; Jatheevsar Krishnan; Kaarthik Guna; Kovalan Kesavan; Mohanarajh Batumaly; Shachien Remesi; Thinesh Raaj Gopalan; Viknesshwaran Gunaseelan	Men's tournament	South Korea; W 40–38	Iran; L 23–53	Pakistan; L 35–58	3	Did not advance		

== Karate ==
=== Kata ===
Athlete	Event	Round 1		Round 2		Final / BM	
Athlete	Event	Score	Rank	Score	Rank	Opposition Score	Rank
Lovelly Anne Robberth	Women's individual	38.60	2 Q	40.40	1 Q	Shimizu K (JPN); L 39.80–42.60	2nd place, silver medalist(s)
Lovelly Anne Robberth; Madhuri Poovanesan; Naccy Nelly Evvaferra; Niathalia Sherawinnie	Women's team	Brunei; W 38.80–38.20	—N/a			Vietnam; L 39.00–42.70	2nd place, silver medalist(s)

=== Kumite ===
Men

Athlete	Event	Round of 32	Round of 16	Repechange R1	Repechange R2	Quarterfinals	Semifinals	Final / BM	
Athlete	Event	Opposition score	Opposition score	Opposition score	Opposition score	Opposition score	Opposition score	Opposition score	Rank
Sureeya Sankar Hari Sankar	-60 kg	Bye	K Alpysbay (KAZ); L 3–5	Chau K H (HKG); W 5–5	S Muekthong (THA); L 5–7	Did not advance			
Prem Kumar Selvam	-67 kg	Song Y-h (PRK); W 6–2	Galuge D A F (SRI); W 2–0	—N/a		D Amirali (KAZ); L 0–8	Did not advance		
Sharmendran Raghonathan	-75 kg	Bye	D Nazmyradov (TKM); W 4–2	—N/a		Al Zahrani S J M (KSA); W 5–2	N Azhikanov (KAZ); L 3–4	N Nurlanov (KGZ); L 0–8	4
Muhammad Arif Afifuddin bin Ab Malik	-84 kg	—N/a	Do T N (VIE); W 2–0	—N/a		S Firmansah (INA); W 4–3	Baek J-h (KOR); W 5–2	D Yuldashev (KAZ); W 10–4	1st place, gold medalist(s)

Women

Athlete	Event	Round of 32	Round of 16	Quarterfinals	Semifinals	Repechange	Final / BM
Athlete	Event	Opposition score	Opposition score	Opposition score	Opposition score	Opposition score	Rank
Shahmalarani Chandran	-50 kg	S Jaman (BAN); W 3–2	S Bahmanyar (IRI); L 3–7	Did not advance			
Madhuri Poovanesan	-55 kg	—N/a	L Mansour (JOR); L 2–11	Did not advance			
Zakiah Adnan	-61 kg	—N/a	A Kanay (KAZ); L 0–6	Did not advance			

== Rugby sevens ==
Team	Event	Group stage			Quarterfinal	Semifinal / Pl.	Final / BM / Pl.	
Team	Event	Opposition score	Opposition score	Rank	Opposition score	Opposition score	Opposition score	Rank
Malaysia men's	Men's tournament	Philippines; W 24–7	Hong Kong; L 7–40	2 Q	South Korea; L 5–26	Singapore; W 33–7	United Arab Emirates; L 14–28	6

== Sailing ==
Athlete	Event	Race														Final	
Athlete	Event	1	2	3	4	5	6	7	8	9	10	11	12	13	14	Score	Rank
Khairulnizam Afendy	Men's ILCA7	7	~~8~~	3	6	8	8	7	7	7	5	3	Cancelled		—N/a	69	8
Muhammad Izzuddin Abdul Rani	Men's RS:X	4	~~DNF~~	4	5	5	5	3	5	3	3	~~DNF~~	4	3	3	61	4
Muhammad Asnawi Iqbal Adam	Boy's ILCA4	6	5	7	3	1	6	7	3	2	2	~~9~~	—N/a			51	3rd place, bronze medalist(s)
Nur Shazrin Mohd Latif	Women's ILCA6	1	2	2	1	3	1	4	~~5~~	4	4	3	Cancelled	—N/a		30	1st place, gold medalist(s)
Tengku Nurani Ezaty Tengku Khairudeen	Women's RS:X	~~DNF~~	4	3	3	3	4	3	3	3	3	4	3	4	3	48	3rd place, bronze medalist(s)
Muhammad Fauzi Kaman Shah; Juni Karimah Noor Jamali	470	~~DSQ~~	2	~~DSQ~~	3	6	6	5	4	4	6	2	3	—N/a		57	5

== Sepak takraw ==
Athlete	Event	Group stage			Semifinal	Final	
Athlete	Event	Opposition score	Opposition score	Rank	Opposition score	Opposition score	Rank
Amirul Zazwan bin Amir; Mohammad Azlan bin Alias; Mohammad Syahir bin Mohd Rosdi; Mohd Khairol Zaman bin Hamir Akhbar; Muhammad Zarif bin Marican	Men's regu	Vietnam; W 2–1	Singapore; W 2–0	1 Q	Philippines; W 2–0	Thailand; L 0–2	2nd place, silver medalist(s)
Aidil Aiman bin Azwawi; Amirul Zazwan bin Amir; Farhan bin Adam; Mohammad Azlan bin Alias; Mohammad Syahir bin Mohd Rosdi; Mohd Khairol Zaman bin Hamir Akhbar; Muhammad Afifuddin bin Mohd Razali; Muhammad Hairul Hazizi bin Haidzir; Muhammad Haziq bin Hairul Nizam; Muhamad Noraizat bin Mohd Nordin; Muhammad Zaim bin Razali; Muhammad Zarif bin Marican	Men's team regu	Indonesia; W 2–1	South Korea; W 3–0	1 Q	Laos; W 2–0	Thailand; L 0–2	2nd place, silver medalist(s)

== Shooting ==
Men

Athlete	Event	Qualification		Final	
Athlete	Event	Score	Rank	Score	Rank
Johnathan Wong	10m air pistol	580-22x	3 Q	157.0	6
Haritz Iklil Hessly Hafiz	10m air rifle	622.6	32	Did not advance	
Haritz Iklil Hessly Hafiz	50m rifle 3 positions	575-24x	24	Did not advance	
Joseph Lee Joon Kit	Skeet	112	29	Did not advance	
Bernard Yeoh	Trap	113	26	Did not advance	

Women

Athlete	Event	Qualification		Final	
Athlete	Event	Score	Rank	Score	Rank
Alia Husna Badruddin	10m air rifle	619.9	39	Did not advance	
Nur Suryani Taibi	10m air rifle	617.8	44	Did not advance	
Joseline Cheah Lee Yean	10m air pistol	567-13x	34	Did not advance	
Nurul Syasya Nadiah Mohd Arifin	10m air pistol	569-16x	27	Did not advance	
Bibiana Ng	10m air pistol	569-19x	25	Did not advance	
Bibiana Ng	25m pistol	576-18x	20	Did not advance	
Alia Sazana Azahari	25m pistol	576-18x	20	Did not advance	
Nur Suryani Taibi	50m rifle 3 positions	572-16x	34	Did not advance	
Alia Husna Badruddin	50m rifle 3 positions	581-26x	17	Did not advance	

Mixed

Athlete	Event	Qualification		Final / BM	
Athlete	Event	Score	Rank	Score	Rank
Johnathan Wong; Nurul Syasya Nadiah Mohd Arifin	10m air pistol team	573	7	Did not advance	
Haritz Iklil Hessly Hafiz; Nur Suryani Taibi	10m air rifle team	618.4	17	Did not advance	

== Squash ==
Singles

Athlete	Event	Round of 32	Round of 16	Quarterfinals	Semifinals	Final	Rank
Athlete	Event	Opposition score	Opposition score	Opposition score	Opposition score	Opposition score	Rank
Ng Eain Yow	Men	Bye	Amjad (QAT); W 3–0	Al-Muzayen (KUW); W 3–0	Al-Tamimi (QAT); W 3–1	Ghosal (IND); W 3–1	1st place, gold medalist(s)
Addeen Idrakie	Men	Simha (NEP); W 3–0	Laksiri (SRI); W 3–1	Al-Tamimi (QAT); L 0–3	Did not advance		
Sivasangari Subramaniam	Women	Bye	Ijaz (PAK); W 3–0	Heo M-g (KOR); W 3–0	Watanabe (JPN); W 3–0	Chan S Y (HKG); W 3–2	1st place, gold medalist(s)
Aira Azman	Women	Bye	Liu K C (MAC); W 3–0	Chan S Y (HKG); L 0–3	Did not advance		

Doubles

Athlete	Event	Group stage					Quarterfinals	Semifinals	Final	Rank
Athlete	Event	Opposition score	Opposition score	Opposition score	Opposition score	Rank	Opposition score	Opposition score	Opposition score	Rank
Mohd Syafiq Kamal; Aifa Azman	Mixed	Zhou ZT / Li DJ (CHN); W 2–0	Mukhtar Wakeel / Veera Samiyel (SRI); W 2–0	Garcia / Aribado (PHI); W 2–0	—N/a	1 Q	Yoo J-j / Eum H-y (KOR); W 2–0	Singh / Singh (IND); W 2–1	Sandhu / Karthik (IND); L 0–2	2nd place, silver medalist(s)
Ivan Yuen; Rachel Arnold	Mixed	Lee D-j / Yang Y-s (KOR); L 1–2	Buranakul / Ngamprasert (THA); W 2–0	Bhlon / Shrestha (NEP); W 2–0	Wong C H / Lee K Y (HKG); L 0–2	3	Did not advance			

Team

Athlete	Event	Group Stage						Semifinals	Finals	
Athlete	Event	Opposition score	Opposition score	Opposition score	Opposition score	Opposition score	Rank	Opposition score	Opposition score	Rank
Addeen Idrakie; Ivan Yuen; Mohd Syafiq Kamal; Ng Eain Yow	Men's Team	Philippines (PHI); W 3–0	South Korea (KOR); W 3–0	Japan (JPN); W 3–0	Thailand (THA); W 3–0	Hong Kong (HKG); W 2–1	1 Q	India (IND); L 0–2	Did not advance	3rd place, bronze medalist(s)
Aifa Azman; Aira Azman; Rachel Arnold; Sivasangari Subramaniam	Women's Team	Nepal (NEP); W 3–0	Pakistan (PAK); W 3–0	Macau (MAC); W 3–0	India (IND); W 3–0	—N/a	1 Q	South Korea (KOR); W 2–0	Hong Kong (HKG); W 2–1	1st place, gold medalist(s)

== Swimming ==
Men

Athlete	Event	Heat		Final	
Athlete	Event	Time	Rank	Time	Rank
Arvin Shaun Singh Chahal	50m backstroke	26.56	18	Did not advance	
Arvin Shaun Singh Chahal	100m freestyle	50.98	18	Did not advance	
Bryan Leong Xin Ren	50m butterfly	24.46	14	Did not advance	
Bryan Leong Xin Ren	50m freestyle	23.55	19	Did not advance	
Bryan Leong Xin Ren	100m butterfly	53.26	10	Did not advance	
Hii Puong Wei	100m backstroke	57.67	16	Did not advance	
Hii Puong Wei	100m breaststroke	1:03.21	16	Did not advance	
Hii Puong Wei	200m backstroke	2:07.55	16	Did not advance	
Hii Puong Wei	200m breaststroke	2:21.36	15	Did not advance	
Khiew Hoe Yean	200m freestyle	1:48.97	9	Did not advance	
Khiew Hoe Yean	400m freestyle	3:51.31	2 Q	3:49.47	4
Lim Yin Chuen	100m freestyle	50.82	13	Did not advance	
Lim Yin Chuen	200m butterfly	2:06.76	14	Did not advance	
Lim Yin Chuen	200m freestyle	1:51.18	11	Did not advance	
Tan Khai Xin	200m individual medley	2:06.18	15	Did not advance	
Tan Khai Xin	400m freestyle	3:58.62	13	Did not advance	
Tan Khai Xin	400m individual medley	4:27.48	10	Did not advance	
Arvin Shaun Singh Chahal; Bryan Leong Xin Ren; Khiew Hoe Yean; Lim Yin Chuen	4 x 100m freestyle relay	3:22.50	6 Q	3:24.78	8
Arvin Shaun Singh Chahal; Khiew Hoe Yean; Lim Yin Chuen; Tan Khai Xin	4 x 200m freestyle relay	7:26.17	5 Q	7:22.08	5
Arvin Shaun Singh Chahal; Bryan Leong Xin Ren; Hii Puong Wei; Khiew Hoe Yean	4 x 100m medley relay	3:46.12	10	Did not advance	

Women

Athlete	Event	Heat		Final	
Athlete	Event	Time	Rank	Time	Rank
Phee Jinq En	50m breaststroke	31.97	11	Did not advance	
Phee Jinq En	100m breaststroke	1:09.74	8 Q	1:10.40	8

== Taekwondo ==
Poomsae

Athlete	Event	Round of 16	Quarter-finals	Semi-finals	Final	
Athlete	Event	Opposition score	Opposition score	Opposition score	Opposition score	Rank
Jason Loo Jun Wei	Men's individual	Tong H P (MAC); W 7.910–7.510	Ma Y-z (TPE); L 7.770–7.950	Did not advance		
Nurul Hidayah binti Abdul Karim	Women's individual	Chu L Y (HKG); W 7.660–7.540	Salahshouri (IRI); L 7.780–7.780	Did not advance		

== Wushu ==
Taolu

Athlete	Event	Event 1		Event 2		Total	Rank
Athlete	Event	Result	Rank	Result	Rank	Total	Rank
Wong Weng Son	Men's changquan	9.00	13	—N/a	—N/a	9.00	13
Calvin Lee Wai Leong	Men's nanquan and nangun	9.693	10	9.710	7	19.403	8
Tan Zhi Yan	Men's taijiquan and taijijian	9.733	8	9.716	8	19.449	7
Clement Ting Su Wei	Men's daoshu and gunshu	9.713	5	9.723	4	19.436	5
Tan Cheong Min	Women's nanquan and nandao	9.703	2	9.716	2	19.419	2nd place, silver medalist(s)
Sydney Chin Sy Xuan	Women's taijiquan and taijijian	9.73	5	9.73	5	19.46	4
Pang Pui Yee	Women's jianshu and qiangshu	9.703	5	9.573	9	19.276	7

== Xiangqi ==
=== Individual ===
Athlete	Event	Round								Final	
Athlete	Event	Round 1	Round 2	Round 3	Round 4	Round 5	Round 6	Round 7	Rank	Opposition score	Rank
Athlete	Event	Opposition score	Opposition score	Opposition score	Opposition score	Opposition score	Opposition score	Opposition score	Rank	Opposition score	Rank
Sim Yip How	Men's	Liu K-h (TPE); L 0–2	Ge J-y (TPE); D 1–1	Wong H H (HKG); D 1–1	Sou C H (MAC); D 1–1	R Lokutarapol (THA); W 2–0	Tan Y H (MAS); W 2–0	Nguyen T B (VIE); D 1–1	7	Did not advance	
Tan Yu Huat	Men's	P Panichkul (THA); W 2–0	Sou C H (MAC); W 2–0	Low Y H (SGP); L 0–2	Chen Y L (HKG); W 2–0	Lai L H (VIE); L 0–2	Sim Y H (MAS); L 0–2	Chheang H (CAM); W 2–0	8	Did not advance	
Jee Xin Ru	Women's	Nguyen T P L (VIE); W 2–0	Li S-y (TPE); W 2–0	Wang LN (CHN); L 0–2	Peng J-a (TPE); W 2–0	Zuo WJ (CHN); L 0–2	Ngo L H (SGP); D 1–1	Lam K Y (HKG); D 1–1	4	Did not advance	

=== Team ===
Athlete	Event	Round						Final	
Athlete	Event	Round 1	Round 2	Round 3	Round 4	Round 5	Rank	Opposition score	Rank
Athlete	Event	Opposition score	Opposition score	Opposition score	Opposition score	Opposition score	Rank	Opposition score	Rank
Sim Yip Hou; Tan Yu Huat; Jee Xin Ru	Mixed	Thailand; W 2–0	Hong Kong; L 0–2	Vietnam; L 0–2	Macau; W 2–0	Chinese Taipei; L 0–2	6	Did not advance	
