= Diving at the 2026 Asian Games – Men's 10 metre platform =

Diving competition

Men's 10 metre platform at the 2026 Asian Games
- Venue: Tokyo Aquatics Centre
- Date: 30 September 2026
- Competitors: 12 from 6 nations

Medalists
gold medal	Lian Junjie	China
silver medal	Rikuto Tamai	Japan
bronze medal	Zhao Renjie	China

The men's 10 metre platform competition at the 2026 Asian Games took place on 30 September 2026 at Tokyo Aquatics Centre. Lian Junjie won China's 100th diving gold in history of Asian Games

== Schedule ==
All times are Japan Standard Time (UTC+09:00)

Date	Time	Event
Wednesday, 30 September 2026	12:00	Preliminary
Wednesday, 30 September 2026	17:30	Final

== Results ==
Legend

- DNS — Did not start

=== Preliminary ===
Rank	Athlete	Dive						Total
Rank	Athlete	1	2	3	4	5	6	Total
1	Lian Junjie (CHN)	84.80	76.80	78.75	86.70	88.20	101.75	517.00
2	Zhao Renjie (CHN)	78.40	90.00	76.50	52.20	72.15	93.60	462.85
3	Rikuto Tamai (JPN)	72.00	81.00	61.05	73.80	73.10	91.80	452.75
4	Kim Yeong-taek (KOR)	60.00	60.80	63.00	78.75	57.80	54.00	374.35
5	Bertrand Rhodict Lises (MAS)	65.60	66.00	57.75	57.80	52.80	66.60	366.55
6	Shu Okubo (JPN)	65.60	70.40	33.30	51.15	56.00	62.90	339.35
7	Shin Jung-whi (KOR)	63.00	62.40	57.75	45.90	48.00	61.20	338.25
8	Igor Myalin (UZB)	65.60	37.80	55.80	52.80	58.50	59.20	329.70
9	Elvis Priestly Clement (MAS)	72.00	61.50	28.80	54.45	40.80	55.80	313.35
10	Mohammad Moghaddasi (IRI)	56.00	19.80	37.40	44.80	54.00	29.70	241.70
—	Sam Vajir (IRI)							DNS
—	Amal Mavlyanov (UZB)							DNS

=== Final ===
Rank	Athlete	Dive						Total
Rank	Athlete	1	2	3	4	5	6	Total
1st place, gold medalist(s)	Lian Junjie (CHN)	83.20	81.60	77.00	91.80	91.80	75.85	501.25
2nd place, silver medalist(s)	Rikuto Tamai (JPN)	80.00	81.00	81.40	86.40	74.80	93.60	497.20
3rd place, bronze medalist(s)	Zhao Renjie (CHN)	86.40	91.80	96.90	27.00	44.40	81.00	427.50
4	Shu Okubo (JPN)	80.00	73.60	61.05	75.90	76.80	54.40	421.75
5	Bertrand Rhodict Lises (MAS)	67.20	69.30	67.65	71.40	49.60	49.95	375.10
6	Igor Myalin (UZB)	64.00	51.80	64.80	47.85	67.50	72.00	367.95
7	Shin Jung-whi (KOR)	61.50	62.40	67.65	40.80	60.80	64.80	357.95
8	Elvis Priestly Clement (MAS)	68.80	63.00	43.20	72.60	28.90	75.60	352.10
9	Kim Yeong-taek (KOR)	58.50	33.60	43.20	61.25	61.20	45.00	302.75
10	Mohammad Moghaddasi (IRI)	40.00	24.75	51.00	57.60	46.50	28.05	247.90
