= He Chao =

He Chao may refer to:

- He Chao (footballer)
- He Chao (diver)
