= Diving at the 2014 Asian Games – Men's 1 metre springboard =

Men's 1 metre springboard at the 2014 Asian Games
- Venue: Munhak Park Tae-hwan Aquatics Center
- Date: 1 October 2014
- Competitors: 12 from 7 nations

Medalists
gold medal	He Chao	China
silver medal	He Chong	China
bronze medal	Woo Ha-ram	South Korea

The men's 1 metre springboard diving competition at the 2014 Asian Games in Incheon was held on 1 October at the Munhak Park Tae-hwan Aquatics Center.

== Schedule ==
All times are Korea Standard Time (UTC+09:00)

Date	Time	Event
Wednesday, 1 October 2014	16:10	Final

== Results ==
Rank	Athlete	Dive						Total
Rank	Athlete	1	2	3	4	5	6	Total
1st place, gold medalist(s)	He Chao (CHN)	65.00	69.00	83.20	79.90	84.15	81.60	462.85
2nd place, silver medalist(s)	He Chong (CHN)	66.30	72.00	67.50	79.20	81.60	76.50	443.10
3rd place, bronze medalist(s)	Woo Ha-ram (KOR)	71.30	70.50	67.20	67.50	58.50	75.00	410.00
4	Sho Sakai (JPN)	62.40	54.00	70.50	55.20	62.40	67.20	371.70
5	Ooi Tze Liang (MAS)	59.80	33.00	48.00	70.50	67.20	78.20	356.70
6	Ahmad Amsyar Azman (MAS)	59.80	60.45	72.00	30.00	72.00	58.50	352.75
7	Kim Yeong-nam (KOR)	64.50	69.30	72.00	62.40	0.00	51.15	319.35
8	Timothy Lee (SIN)	52.80	54.60	58.90	39.10	45.60	42.90	293.90
9	Abdulrahman Abbas (KUW)	48.05	34.50	48.00	46.50	54.60	54.60	286.25
10	Mohammed Shewaiter (QAT)	55.80	44.20	46.50	60.00	32.40	44.55	283.45
11	Shady Salah Abdelhamid (QAT)	49.40	48.00	43.75	46.80	52.50	40.50	280.95
12	Hasan Qali (KUW)	55.90	32.55	54.00	37.70	49.50	27.00	256.65
