= Cycling at the 2022 Asian Games – Men's keirin =

Men's keirin at the 2022 Asian Games
- Venue: Chun'an Jieshou Sports Centre Velodrome
- Dates: 29 September 2023
- Competitors: 18 from 9 nations

Medalists
gold medal	Zhou Yu	China
silver medal	Kang Seo-jun	South Korea
bronze medal	Shah Firdaus Sahrom	Malaysia

The men's keirin event at the 2022 Asian Games was held on 29 September 2023.

== Schedule ==
All times are China Standard Time (UTC+08:00)

Date	Time	Event
Friday, 29 September 2023	14:30	First round
Friday, 29 September 2023	15:18	Repechages
Friday, 29 September 2023	18:09	Semifinals
Friday, 29 September 2023	19:54	Finals

== Results ==
Legend

- DNF — Did not finish
- DNS — Did not start

=== First round ===
==== Heat 1 ====
Rank	Athlete	Gap
1	Shinji Nakano (JPN)	
2	Kang Seo-jun (KOR)	+0.365
3	Zhou Yu (CHN)	+0.465
4	Jai Angsuthasawit (THA)	+0.665
5	Hsiao Shih-hsin (TPE)	+0.701
6	Fadhil Zonis (MAS)	+1.022

==== Heat 2 ====
Rank	Athlete	Gap
1	Kaiya Ota (JPN)	
2	David Beckham (IND)	+0.112
3	Liu Qi (CHN)	+0.189
4	Choi Woo-rim (KOR)	+0.364
5	Yung Tsun Ho (HKG)	+0.507
6	Sergey Ponomaryov (KAZ)	+0.900

==== Heat 3 ====
Rank	Athlete	Gap
1	Shah Firdaus Sahrom (MAS)	
2	Kang Shih-feng (TPE)	+0.074
3	To Cheuk Hei (HKG)	+0.281
4	Andrey Chugay (KAZ)	+0.472
—	Esow Alben (IND)	DNF
—	Jaturong Niwanti (THA)	DNF

=== Repechages ===
==== Heat 1 ====
Rank	Athlete	Gap
1	Zhou Yu (CHN)	
2	Andrey Chugay (KAZ)	+0.047
3	Fadhil Zonis (MAS)	+0.437
4	Yung Tsun Ho (HKG)	+0.532
5	Choi Woo-rim (KOR)	+0.661
6	Jaturong Niwanti (THA)	DNS

==== Heat 2 ====
Rank	Athlete	Gap
1	Liu Qi (CHN)	
2	To Cheuk Hei (HKG)	+0.029
3	Esow Alben (IND)	+0.134
4	Sergey Ponomaryov (KAZ)	+0.559
5	Hsiao Shih-hsin (TPE)	+0.917
6	Jai Angsuthasawit (THA)	+1.023

=== Semifinals ===
==== Heat 1 ====
Rank	Athlete	Gap
1	Shinji Nakano (JPN)	
2	Andrey Chugay (KAZ)	+0.444
3	Liu Qi (CHN)	+0.565
4	Kang Shih-feng (TPE)	+0.698
5	David Beckham (IND)	+0.922
6	Esow Alben (IND)	+2.980

==== Heat 2 ====
Rank	Athlete	Gap
1	Shah Firdaus Sahrom (MAS)	
2	Zhou Yu (CHN)	+0.055
3	Kang Seo-jun (KOR)	+0.131
4	To Cheuk Hei (HKG)	+0.208
5	Kaiya Ota (JPN)	+0.229
6	Fadhil Zonis (MAS)	+0.543

=== Finals ===
==== Final 7–12 ====
Rank	Athlete	Gap
1	Kaiya Ota (JPN)	
2	Fadhil Zonis (MAS)	+0.058
3	To Cheuk Hei (HKG)	+0.534
4	Esow Alben (IND)	+0.651
5	David Beckham (IND)	+1.096
6	Kang Shih-feng (TPE)	+3.027

==== Final 1–6 ====
Rank	Athlete	Gap
1	Zhou Yu (CHN)	
2	Kang Seo-jun (KOR)	+1.474
3	Shah Firdaus Sahrom (MAS)	+1.481
4	Shinji Nakano (JPN)	+1.631
5	Liu Qi (CHN)	+1.924
6	Andrey Chugay (KAZ)	+2.135

== Final standing ==
Rank	Athlete
1st place, gold medalist(s)	Zhou Yu (CHN)
2nd place, silver medalist(s)	Kang Seo-jun (KOR)
3rd place, bronze medalist(s)	Shah Firdaus Sahrom (MAS)
4	Shinji Nakano (JPN)
5	Liu Qi (CHN)
6	Andrey Chugay (KAZ)
7	Kaiya Ota (JPN)
8	Fadhil Zonis (MAS)
9	To Cheuk Hei (HKG)
10	Esow Alben (IND)
11	David Beckham (IND)
12	Kang Shih-feng (TPE)
13	Yung Tsun Ho (HKG)
13	Sergey Ponomaryov (KAZ)
15	Choi Woo-rim (KOR)
15	Hsiao Shih-hsin (TPE)
17	Jai Angsuthasawit (THA)
17	Jaturong Niwanti (THA)
