= Cycling at the 2022 Asian Games – Men's sprint =

Men's sprint at the 2022 Asian Games
- Venue: Chun'an Jieshou Sports Centre Velodrome
- Dates: 27–28 September 2023
- Competitors: 18 from 9 nations

Medalists
gold medal	Kaiya Ota	Japan
silver medal	Zhou Yu	China
bronze medal	Shah Firdaus Sahrom	Malaysia

The men's sprint event at the 2022 Asian Games was held on 27 and 28 September 2023.

== Schedule ==
All times are China Standard Time (UTC+08:00)

Date	Time	Event
Wednesday, 27 September 2023	10:00	Qualifying
Wednesday, 27 September 2023	10:44	1/16 finals
Wednesday, 27 September 2023	11:20	1/16 finals repechages
Wednesday, 27 September 2023	15:12	1/8 finals
Wednesday, 27 September 2023	16:00	1/8 finals repechages
Thursday, 28 September 2023	10:18	Quarterfinals
Thursday, 28 September 2023	15:00	Semifinals
Thursday, 28 September 2023	15:06	Race for 5th–8th places
Thursday, 28 September 2023	16:33	Finals

== Records ==
Prior to this competition, the existing world, Asian and Games records were as follows.

World Record	Nicholas Paul (TTO)	9.100	Cochabamba, Bolivia	4 September 2019
Asian Record	Yuta Wakimoto (JPN)	9.518	Tokyo, Japan	4 August 2021
Games Record	Im Chae-bin (KOR)	9.865	Jakarta, Indonesia	30 August 2018

== Results ==
Legend

- REL — Relegated

=== Qualifying ===
Rank	Athlete	Time	Notes
1	Zhou Yu (CHN)	9.623	GR
2	Kaiya Ota (JPN)	9.688	
3	Xue Chenxi (CHN)	9.798	
4	Shinji Nakano (JPN)	9.821	
5	Shah Firdaus Sahrom (MAS)	9.851	
6	Kang Shih-feng (TPE)	9.936	
7	Oh Je-seok (KOR)	9.981	
8	Sergey Ponomaryov (KAZ)	10.023	
9	David Beckham (IND)	10.030	
10	Ridwan Sahrom (MAS)	10.073	
11	Kang Seo-jun (KOR)	10.073	
12	Andrey Chugay (KAZ)	10.086	
13	Ronaldo Laitonjam (IND)	10.086	
14	To Cheuk Hei (HKG)	10.105	
15	Jai Angsuthasawit (THA)	10.191	
16	Jaturong Niwanti (THA)	10.305	
17	Yung Tsun Ho (HKG)	10.357	
18	Yang Sheng-kai (TPE)	10.411	

=== 1/16 finals ===
==== Heat 1 ====
Rank	Athlete	Gap
1	Zhou Yu (CHN)	
2	Jaturong Niwanti (THA)	+0.094

==== Heat 2 ====
Rank	Athlete	Gap
1	Kaiya Ota (JPN)	
2	Jai Angsuthasawit (THA)	+0.054

==== Heat 3 ====
Rank	Athlete	Gap
1	Xue Chenxi (CHN)	
2	To Cheuk Hei (HKG)	+0.045

==== Heat 4 ====
Rank	Athlete	Gap
1	Shinji Nakano (JPN)	
2	Ronaldo Laitonjam (IND)	+3.350

==== Heat 5 ====
Rank	Athlete	Gap
1	Shah Firdaus Sahrom (MAS)	
2	Andrey Chugay (KAZ)	+0.336

==== Heat 6 ====
Rank	Athlete	Gap
1	Kang Shih-feng (TPE)	
2	Kang Seo-jun (KOR)	+0.102

==== Heat 7 ====
Rank	Athlete	Gap
1	Ridwan Sahrom (MAS)	
2	Oh Je-seok (KOR)	+0.059

==== Heat 8 ====
Rank	Athlete	Gap
1	David Beckham (IND)	
2	Sergey Ponomaryov (KAZ)	+0.188

=== 1/16 finals repechages ===
==== Heat 1 ====
Rank	Athlete	Gap
1	Sergey Ponomaryov (KAZ)	
2	Jaturong Niwanti (THA)	+0.091

==== Heat 2 ====
Rank	Athlete	Gap
1	Oh Je-seok (KOR)	
2	Jai Angsuthasawit (THA)	+0.016

==== Heat 3 ====
Rank	Athlete	Gap
1	Kang Seo-jun (KOR)	
2	To Cheuk Hei (HKG)	+0.019

==== Heat 4 ====
Rank	Athlete	Gap
1	Andrey Chugay (KAZ)	
2	Ronaldo Laitonjam (IND)	+0.015

=== 1/8 finals ===
==== Heat 1 ====
Rank	Athlete	Gap
1	Zhou Yu (CHN)	
2	Andrey Chugay (KAZ)	+0.076

==== Heat 2 ====
Rank	Athlete	Gap
1	Kaiya Ota (JPN)	
2	Kang Seo-jun (KOR)	+2.108

==== Heat 3 ====
Rank	Athlete	Gap
1	Xue Chenxi (CHN)	
2	Oh Je-seok (KOR)	+0.567

==== Heat 4 ====
Rank	Athlete	Gap
1	Shinji Nakano (JPN)	
2	Sergey Ponomaryov (KAZ)	+0.154

==== Heat 5 ====
Rank	Athlete	Gap
1	Shah Firdaus Sahrom (MAS)	
2	David Beckham (IND)	+0.276

==== Heat 6 ====
Rank	Athlete	Gap
1	Kang Shih-feng (TPE)	
2	Ridwan Sahrom (MAS)	+0.308

=== 1/8 finals repechages ===
==== Heat 1 ====
Rank	Athlete	Gap
1	David Beckham (IND)	
2	Sergey Ponomaryov (KAZ)	+0.061
3	Andrey Chugay (KAZ)	+0.796

==== Heat 2 ====
Rank	Athlete	Gap
1	Ridwan Sahrom (MAS)	
2	Oh Je-seok (KOR)	+0.013
3	Kang Seo-jun (KOR)	+0.165

=== Quarterfinals ===
==== Heat 1 ====
Rank	Athlete	Rane 1	Race 2	Decider
1	Zhou Yu (CHN)	+0.049		
2	Ridwan Sahrom (MAS)		+0.042	+0.106

==== Heat 2 ====
Rank	Athlete	Rane 1	Race 2	Decider
1	Kaiya Ota (JPN)			
2	David Beckham (IND)	+2.395	+0.046	

==== Heat 3 ====
Rank	Athlete	Rane 1	Race 2	Decider
1	Xue Chenxi (CHN)			
2	Kang Shih-feng (TPE)	+0.062	+1.450	

==== Heat 4 ====
Rank	Athlete	Rane 1	Race 2	Decider
1	Shah Firdaus Sahrom (MAS)			
2	Shinji Nakano (JPN)	+0.102	+0.076	

=== Race for 5th–8th places ===
Rank	Athlete	Gap
1	Kang Shih-feng (TPE)	
2	Shinji Nakano (JPN)	+0.047
3	Ridwan Sahrom (MAS)	+0.104
4	David Beckham (IND)	+0.109

=== Semifinals ===
==== Heat 1 ====
Rank	Athlete	Rane 1	Race 2	Decider
1	Zhou Yu (CHN)			
2	Shah Firdaus Sahrom (MAS)	REL	+13.598	

==== Heat 2 ====
Rank	Athlete	Rane 1	Race 2	Decider
1	Kaiya Ota (JPN)			
2	Xue Chenxi (CHN)	+0.729	+0.199	

=== Finals ===
==== Bronze ====
Rank	Athlete	Rane 1	Race 2	Decider
1	Shah Firdaus Sahrom (MAS)			
2	Xue Chenxi (CHN)	+0.091	+0.047	

==== Gold ====
Rank	Athlete	Rane 1	Race 2	Decider
1	Kaiya Ota (JPN)			
2	Zhou Yu (CHN)	+0.418	0.213	

== Final standing ==
Rank	Athlete
1st place, gold medalist(s)	Kaiya Ota (JPN)
2nd place, silver medalist(s)	Zhou Yu (CHN)
3rd place, bronze medalist(s)	Shah Firdaus Sahrom (MAS)
4	Xue Chenxi (CHN)
5	Kang Shih-feng (TPE)
6	Shinji Nakano (JPN)
7	Ridwan Sahrom (MAS)
8	David Beckham (IND)
9	Oh Je-seok (KOR)
10	Sergey Ponomaryov (KAZ)
11	Kang Seo-jun (KOR)
12	Andrey Chugay (KAZ)
13	Ronaldo Laitonjam (IND)
14	To Cheuk Hei (HKG)
15	Jai Angsuthasawit (THA)
16	Jaturong Niwanti (THA)
17	Yung Tsun Ho (HKG)
18	Yang Sheng-kai (TPE)
