= Squash at the 2022 Asian Games – Mixed doubles =

Mixed doubles at the 2022 Asian Games
- Venue: Hangzhou Olympic Expo Squash Court
- Dates: 1–5 October 2023
- Competitors: 36 from 11 nations

Medalists
gold medal	Harinder Pal Sandhu; Dipika Pallikal	India
silver medal	Mohd Syafiq Kamal; Aifa Azman	Malaysia
bronze medal	Wong Chi Him; Lee Ka Yi	Hong Kong
bronze medal	Abhay Singh; Anahat Singh	India

The mixed doubles squash event was part of the squash programme and took place between 1 October and 5 October 2023, at the Hangzhou Olympic Sports Center.

== Schedule ==
All times are China Standard Time (UTC+08:00)

Date	Time	Event
Sunday, 1 October 2023	11:00	Preliminary round
Monday, 2 October 2023	11:00	Preliminary round
Tuesday, 3 October 2023	11:00	Preliminary round
Tuesday, 3 October 2023	17:00	Quarterfinals
Wednesday, 4 October 2023	12:00	Semifinals
Thursday, 5 October 2023	14:00	Gold medal match

== Results ==
=== Preliminary round ===
==== Pool A ====
Pos	Team	Pld	W	L	GF	GA	Qualification
1	Harinder Pal Sandhu (IND) Dipika Pallikal (IND)	3	3	0	6	0	Quarterfinals
2	Yoo Jae-jin (KOR) Eum Hwa-yeong (KOR)	3	2	1	4	3	Quarterfinals
3	Tomotaka Endo (JPN) Risa Sugimoto (JPN)	3	1	2	3	4	
4	Noor Zaman (PAK) Mehwish Ali (PAK)	3	0	3	0	6	

Source: OCA

	Score		Game		
	Score		1	2	3
Harinder Pal Sandhu (IND); Dipika Pallikal (IND)	2–0	Yoo Jae-jin (KOR); Eum Hwa-yeong (KOR)	11–2	11–5	
Harinder Pal Sandhu (IND); Dipika Pallikal (IND)	2–0	Noor Zaman (PAK); Mehwish Ali (PAK)	11–4	11–1	
Tomotaka Endo (JPN); Risa Sugimoto (JPN)	2–0	Noor Zaman (PAK); Mehwish Ali (PAK)	11–8	11–6	
Tomotaka Endo (JPN); Risa Sugimoto (JPN)	1–2	Yoo Jae-jin (KOR); Eum Hwa-yeong (KOR)	11–8	10–11	6–11
Yoo Jae-jin (KOR); Eum Hwa-yeong (KOR)	2–0	Noor Zaman (PAK); Mehwish Ali (PAK)	11–4	11–8	
Harinder Pal Sandhu (IND); Dipika Pallikal (IND)	2–0	Tomotaka Endo (JPN); Risa Sugimoto (JPN)	11–5	11–5	

==== Pool B ====
Pos	Team	Pld	W	L	GF	GA	Qualification
1	Mohd Syafiq Kamal (MAS) Aifa Azman (MAS)	3	3	0	6	0	Quarterfinals
2	Robert Garcia (PHI) Jemyca Aribado (PHI)	3	2	1	4	4	Quarterfinals
3	Shamil Wakeel (SRI) Chanithma Sinaly (SRI)	3	1	2	3	4	
4	Zhou Zhitao (CHN) Li Dongjin (CHN)	3	0	3	1	6	

Source: OCA

	Score		Game		
	Score		1	2	3
Mohd Syafiq Kamal (MAS); Aifa Azman (MAS)	2–0	Zhou Zhitao (CHN); Li Dongjin (CHN)	11–7	11–5	
Mohd Syafiq Kamal (MAS); Aifa Azman (MAS)	2–0	Shamil Wakeel (SRI); Chanithma Sinaly (SRI)	11–4	11–7	
Robert Garcia (PHI); Jemyca Aribado (PHI)	2–1	Shamil Wakeel (SRI); Chanithma Sinaly (SRI)	9–11	11–4	11–0
Robert Garcia (PHI); Jemyca Aribado (PHI)	2–1	Zhou Zhitao (CHN); Li Dongjin (CHN)	11–8	7–11	11–6
Mohd Syafiq Kamal (MAS); Aifa Azman (MAS)	2–0	Robert Garcia (PHI); Jemyca Aribado (PHI)	11–5	11–5	
Zhou Zhitao (CHN); Li Dongjin (CHN)	0–2	Shamil Wakeel (SRI); Chanithma Sinaly (SRI)	6–11	6–11	

==== Pool C ====
Pos	Team	Pld	W	L	GF	GA	Qualification
1	Wong Chi Him (HKG) Lee Ka Yi (HKG)	4	4	0	8	0	Quarterfinals
2	Lee Dong-jun (KOR) Yang Yeon-soo (KOR)	4	3	1	6	3	Quarterfinals
3	Ivan Yuen (MAS) Rachel Arnold (MAS)	4	2	2	5	4	
4	Nopchanok Buranakul (THA) Supakorn Ngamprasert (THA)	4	1	3	2	7	
5	Amir Bhlon (NEP) Swasthani Shrestha (NEP)	4	0	4	1	8	

Source: OCA

	Score		Game		
	Score		1	2	3
Wong Chi Him (HKG); Lee Ka Yi (HKG)	2–0	Amir Bhlon (NEP); Swasthani Shrestha (NEP)	11–1	11–3	
Ivan Yuen (MAS); Rachel Arnold (MAS)	1–2	Lee Dong-jun (KOR); Yang Yeon-soo (KOR)	11–4	8–11	10–11
Lee Dong-jun (KOR); Yang Yeon-soo (KOR)	2–0	Amir Bhlon (NEP); Swasthani Shrestha (NEP)	11–5	11–4	
Ivan Yuen (MAS); Rachel Arnold (MAS)	2–0	Nopchanok Buranakul (THA); Supakorn Ngamprasert (THA)	11–4	11–3	
Ivan Yuen (MAS); Rachel Arnold (MAS)	2–0	Amir Bhlon (NEP); Swasthani Shrestha (NEP)	11–6	11–2	
Wong Chi Him (HKG); Lee Ka Yi (HKG)	2–0	Nopchanok Buranakul (THA); Supakorn Ngamprasert (THA)	11–2	11–0	
Nopchanok Buranakul (THA); Supakorn Ngamprasert (THA)	2–1	Amir Bhlon (NEP); Swasthani Shrestha (NEP)	7–11	11–10	11–8
Wong Chi Him (HKG); Lee Ka Yi (HKG)	2–0	Lee Dong-jun (KOR); Yang Yeon-soo (KOR)	11–4	11–6	
Lee Dong-jun (KOR); Yang Yeon-soo (KOR)	2–0	Nopchanok Buranakul (THA); Supakorn Ngamprasert (THA)	11–7	11–5	
Ivan Yuen (MAS); Rachel Arnold (MAS)	0–2	Wong Chi Him (HKG); Lee Ka Yi (HKG)	9–11	10–11	

==== Pool D ====
Pos	Team	Pld	W	L	GF	GA	Qualification
1	Abhay Singh (IND) Anahat Singh (IND)	4	4	0	8	0	Quarterfinals
2	Tang Ming Hong (HKG) Tong Tsz Wing (HKG)	4	3	1	6	2	Quarterfinals
3	David Pelino (PHI) Aysah Dalida (PHI)	4	2	2	4	4	
4	Farhan Zaman (PAK) Sadia Gul (PAK)	4	1	3	2	6	
5	Arkaradet Arkarahirunya (THA) Anantana Prasertratanakul (THA)	4	0	4	0	8	

Source: OCA

	Score		Game		
	Score		1	2	3
Tang Ming Hong (HKG); Tong Tsz Wing (HKG)	2–0	Arkaradet Arkarahirunya (THA); Anantana Prasertratanakul (THA)	11–4	11–4	
Abhay Singh (IND); Anahat Singh (IND)	2–0	David Pelino (PHI); Aysah Dalida (PHI)	11–7	11–5	
David Pelino (PHI); Aysah Dalida (PHI)	2–0	Arkaradet Arkarahirunya (THA); Anantana Prasertratanakul (THA)	11–6	11–6	
Abhay Singh (IND); Anahat Singh (IND)	2–0	Farhan Zaman (PAK); Sadia Gul (PAK)	11–3	11–2	
Abhay Singh (IND); Anahat Singh (IND)	2–0	Arkaradet Arkarahirunya (THA); Anantana Prasertratanakul (THA)	11–5	11–6	
Tang Ming Hong (HKG); Tong Tsz Wing (HKG)	2–0	Farhan Zaman (PAK); Sadia Gul (PAK)	11–1	11–6	
Farhan Zaman (PAK); Sadia Gul (PAK)	2–0	Arkaradet Arkarahirunya (THA); Anantana Prasertratanakul (THA)	11–9	11–10	
Tang Ming Hong (HKG); Tong Tsz Wing (HKG)	2–0	David Pelino (PHI); Aysah Dalida (PHI)	11–3	11–9	
David Pelino (PHI); Aysah Dalida (PHI)	2–0	Farhan Zaman (PAK); Sadia Gul (PAK)	11–4	11–10	
Abhay Singh (IND); Anahat Singh (IND)	2–0	Tang Ming Hong (HKG); Tong Tsz Wing (HKG)	11–10	11–8	

=== Knockout round ===
Quarterfinals
A1	Harinder Pal Sandhu (IND); Dipika Pallikal (IND)	7	11	11
B2	Robert Garcia (PHI); Jemyca Aribado (PHI)	11	5	4
C1	Wong Chi Him (HKG); Lee Ka Yi (HKG)	11	11
D2	Tang Ming Hong (HKG); Tong Tsz Wing (HKG)	8	8
C2	Lee Dong-jun (KOR); Yang Yeon-soo (KOR)	4	11	1
D1	Abhay Singh (IND); Anahat Singh (IND)	11	8	11
A2	Yoo Jae-jin (KOR); Eum Hwa-yeong (KOR)	5	6
B1	Mohd Syafiq Kamal (MAS); Aifa Azman (MAS)	11	11

Semifinals
A1	Harinder Pal Sandhu (IND); Dipika Pallikal (IND)	7	11	11
C1	Wong Chi Him (HKG); Lee Ka Yi (HKG)	11	7	9
D1	Abhay Singh (IND); Anahat Singh (IND)	11	2	9
B1	Mohd Syafiq Kamal (MAS); Aifa Azman (MAS)	8	11	11

Gold medal match
A1	Harinder Pal Sandhu (IND); Dipika Pallikal (IND)	11	11
B1	Mohd Syafiq Kamal (MAS); Aifa Azman (MAS)	10	10
