= Diving at the 2024 Summer Olympics – Men's 10 metre platform =

Men's 10 metre platform at the Games of the XXXIII Olympiad
- Venue: Paris Aquatics Centre
- Date: 9 August 2024 (Preliminary); 10 August 2024 (semifinals & Final)
- Competitors: 26 from 19 nations
- Winning total: 547.50

Medalists
1st place, gold medalist(s)		Cao Yuan	China
2nd place, silver medalist(s)		Rikuto Tamai	Japan
3rd place, bronze medalist(s)		Noah Williams	Great Britain

The men's 10 metre platform diving competition at the 2024 Summer Olympics in Paris will be held at the Paris Aquatics Centre over 9 and 10 August 2024. It was the 27th appearance of the event, which has been held at every Olympic Games since the 1908 Summer Olympics.

== Competition format ==
The competition was held in three rounds

- Preliminary round: All divers performed six dives; the top 18 divers advanced to the semi-final.
- Semi-final: The scores of the preliminary round were erased. The 18 remaining divers performed six dives each, and the top 12 divers advanced to the final.
- Final: The semi-final scores were erased. The 12 final divers performed six dives each, and the top three divers won the gold, silver and bronze medals respectively.

Within each round of six dives, at least one dive must have been from each of the six groups (forward, back, reverse, inward, twisting, and armstand). Each dive was assigned a degree of difficulty based on somersaults, position, twists, approach, and entry. There was no limit to the degree of difficulty of dives; the most difficult dives calculated in the FINA rulebook (reverse 4 1/2 somersault in pike position and back 4 1/2 somersault in pike position) are 4.7, but competitors could attempt more difficult dives. Scoring was done by a panel of seven judges. For each dive, each judge gave a score between 0 and 10 with 0.5 point increments. The top two and bottom two scores were discarded. The remaining three scores were summed and multiplied by the degree of difficulty to give a dive score. The six dive scores were summed to give the score for the round.

== Schedule ==
All times are Central European Time (UTC+1)

Date	Time	Round
9 August 2024	15:00	Preliminary
10 August 2024	15:00	Semifinal; Final

== Qualification ==
The qualification spots for the Men's 10 metre platform diving event were attributed as follows:

- 2023 World Championships – The top twelve finalists of each individual event obtained a quota place for their NOC at the 2023 World Aquatics Championships, scheduled for July 14 to 30, in Fukuoka, Japan.
- Continental Qualification Tournaments – The winners of each individual event obtained a quota place for their NOC at one of the five continental meets (Africa, the Americas, Asia, Europe, and Oceania) approved by World Aquatics.
- 2024 World Championships – Twelve highest-ranked divers eligible for qualification obtained a quota place for their NOC in each individual event at the 2024 FINA World Championships, scheduled for February 2 to 18, in Doha, Qatar, respecting the two-member country limit and without surpassing the total quota of 136.
- Reallocation – Additional spots were allocated to the eligible divers placed thirteenth and above in their corresponding individual events, respecting the two-member country limit, at the 2024 World Aquatics Championships until they attain the total quota of 136.
- Host nation – As the host country, France reserves four men's spots to be distributed across the individual diving events.

== Results ==
27 divers entered the event, representing 19 nations.

Rank	Diver	Nation	Preliminary		Semi final		Final						Total
Rank	Diver	Nation	Score	Rank	Score	Rank	Dive 1	Dive 2	Dive 3	Dive 4	Dive 5	Dive 6	Total
1st place, gold medalist(s)	Cao Yuan	China	500.15	1	504.00	1	96.90	86.40	97.20	91.80	88.80	86.40	547.50
2nd place, silver medalist(s)	Rikuto Tamai	Japan	497.15	2	477.00	3	88.00	95.40	94.35	91.80	39.10	99.00	507.65
3rd place, bronze medalist(s)	Noah Williams	Great Britain	446.70	8	400.90	12	78.40	86.40	81.60	63.00	93.60	94.35	497.35
4	Cassiel Rousseau	Australia	453.10	7	469.25	4	86.70	81.00	76.80	61.20	82.80	92.50	481.00
5	Randal Willars	Mexico	460.75	6	432.45	7	84.00	88.40	73.50	84.60	84.40	61.50	478.40
6	Timo Barthel	Germany	402.65	12	411.50	9	70.40	69.30	79.20	67.50	81.60	78.20	446.20
7	Rylan Wiens	Canada	485.25	3	468.40	5	76.80	88.80	90.10	70.20	42.90	76.80	445.60
8	Oleksiy Sereda	Ukraine	479.45	5	405.05	11	67.20	66.60	66.30	75.60	64.80	86.40	426.90
9	Kevin Berlín	Mexico	407.15	11	428.65	8	65.60	59.50	79.90	77.40	53.65	84.60	420.65
10	Nathan Zsombor-Murray	Canada	407.20	10	410.80	10	83.20	61.05	64.35	72.00	45.90	78.40	404.90
11	Kyle Kothari	Great Britain	433.10	9	443.55	6	70.40	81.60	72.00	44.55	59.20	73.80	401.55
12	Yang Hao	China	479.80	4	490.55	2	76.80	59.50	61.20	54.00	83.20	55.50	390.20
13	Riccardo Giovannini	Italy	387.65	15	400.65	13	Did not advance						
14	Robert Łukaszewicz	Poland	366.05	18	396.45	14	Did not advance						
15	Andreas Sargent Larsen	Italy	369.50	16	394.15	15	Did not advance						
16	Jaxon Bowshire	Australia	390.30	14	379.40	16	Did not advance						
17	Brandon Loschiavo	United States	393.65	13	372.45	17	Did not advance						
18	Shin Jung-whi	South Korea	369.20	17	290.60	18	Did not advance						
19	Carson Tyler	United States	363.75	19	Did not advance								
20	Alejandro Solarte	Colombia	363.10	20	Did not advance								
21	Igor Myalin	Uzbekistan	357.10	21	Did not advance								
22	Im Yong-myong	North Korea	347.10	22	Did not advance								
23	Anton Knoll	Austria	321.55	23	Did not advance								
24	Kim Yeong-taek	South Korea	320.40	24	Did not advance								
25	Bertrand Rhodict Lises	Malaysia	313.70	25	Did not advance								
26	Ramez Sobhy	Egypt	266.95	26	Did not advance								
