= Wushu at the 2022 Asian Games – Men's taijiquan & taijijian =

Men's taijiquan & taijijian at the 2022 Asian Games
- Venue: Xiaoshan Guali Sports Centre
- Dates: 25 September 2023
- Competitors: 18 from 14 nations

Medalists
gold medal	Gao Haonan	China
silver medal	Samuei Hui	Hong Kong
bronze medal	Jones Inso	Philippines

The men's taijiquan and taijijian competition at the 2022 Asian Games was held on 25 September 2023 at Xiaoshan Guali Sports Centre in Hangzhou, China.

== Schedule ==
All times are China Standard Time (UTC+08:00)

Date	Time	Event
Monday, 25 September 2023	09:00	Taijiquan
Monday, 25 September 2023	14:30	Taijijian

== Results ==
Rank	Athlete	Taijiquan	Taijijian	Total
1st place, gold medalist(s)	Gao Haonan (CHN)	9.830	9.836	19.666
2nd place, silver medalist(s)	Samuei Hui (HKG)	9.743	9.750	19.493
3rd place, bronze medalist(s)	Jones Inso (PHI)	9.746	9.740	19.486
4	Yu Won-hee (KOR)	9.746	9.723	19.469
5	Tomohiro Araya (JPN)	9.730	9.730	19.460
6	Nicholas (INA)	9.730	9.726	19.456
7	Tan Zhi Yan (MAS)	9.733	9.716	19.449
8	Sun Chia-hung (TPE)	9.650	9.750	19.400
9	An Hyeon-gi (KOR)	9.736	9.630	19.366
10	Chan Jun Kai (SGP)	9.730	9.616	19.346
11	Jo Saelee (THA)	9.600	9.686	19.286
12	Wong Kui Sin (MAC)	9.713	9.483	19.196
13	Hosea Wong (BRU)	9.730	9.380	19.110
14	Chen Yu-wei (TPE)	9.736	9.283	19.019
15	Tay Yu Xuan (SGP)	9.736	9.250	18.986
16	Katisak Goolsawadmongkol (THA)	9.696	8.850	18.546
17	Swan Yee Htet Naing (MYA)	9.410	9.050	18.460
18	Pasang Sherpa (NEP)	9.013	8.973	17.986
