= Squash at the 2022 Asian Games – Women's singles =

Women's singles at the 2022 Asian Games
- Venue: Hangzhou Olympic Expo Squash Court
- Dates: 1–5 October 2023
- Competitors: 20 from 10 nations

Medalists
| gold medal | Sivasangari Subramaniam | Malaysia |
| silver medal | Chan Sin Yuk | Hong Kong |
| bronze medal | Satomi Watanabe | Japan |
| bronze medal | Ho Tze Lok | Hong Kong |

The women's singles squash event was part of the squash programme and took place between 1 October and 5 October 2023, at the Hangzhou Olympic Sports Center.

== Schedule ==
All times are China Standard Time (UTC+08:00)

| Date | Time | Event |
|---|---|---|
| Sunday, 1 October 2023 | 17:00 | Round of 32 |
| Monday, 2 October 2023 | 15:00 | Round of 16 |
| Tuesday, 3 October 2023 | 16:00 | Quarterfinals |
| Wednesday, 4 October 2023 | 15:00 | Semifinals |
| Thursday, 5 October 2023 | 16:00 | Gold medal match |

== Results ==
=== Finals ===
| Semifinals | | | | | Gold medal match |
| 1 | Satomi Watanabe (JPN) | 8 | 8 | 4 |
| 4 | Sivasangari Subramaniam (MAS) | 11 | 11 | 11 | 4 | Sivasangari Subramaniam (MAS) | 8 | 15 | 10 | 11 | 12 |
| 3 | Chan Sin Yuk (HKG) | 11 | 11 | 11 | 3 | Chan Sin Yuk (HKG) | 11 | 13 | 12 | 9 | 10 |
| 2 | Ho Tze Lok (HKG) | 4 | 5 | 8 |

=== Top half ===
==== Section 1 ====
| Round of 32 | | | | | Round of 16 | | | | | Quarterfinals |
| | | | | | 1 | Satomi Watanabe (JPN) | 11 | 11 | 11 |
| | Krishna Thapa (NEP) | 3 | 0 | 3 | 13 | Lee Ji-hyun (KOR) | 7 | 3 | 9 |
| 13 | Lee Ji-hyun (KOR) | 11 | 11 | 11 | | | | | | 1 | Satomi Watanabe (JPN) | 11 | 11 | 14 |
| 15 | Arichaya Chujit (THA) | 11 | 11 | 11 | | | | | | 7 | Tanvi Khanna (IND) | 5 | 6 | 12 |
| | Altankhuyagiin Ariunbileg (MGL) | 5 | 5 | 2 | 15 | Arichaya Chujit (THA) | 1 | 3 | 2 |
| | | | | | 7 | Tanvi Khanna (IND) | 11 | 11 | 11 |

==== Section 2 ====
| Round of 32 | | | | | Round of 16 | | | | | | Quarterfinals |
| | | | | | 6 | Joshna Chinappa (IND) | 4 | 12 | 9 | 8 |
| | | | | | 10 | Heo Min-gyeong (KOR) | 11 | 10 | 11 | 11 |
| | | | | | | | | | | | 10 | Heo Min-gyeong (KOR) | 4 | 2 | 8 |
| 14 | Noor-ul-Ain Ijaz (PAK) | 11 | 11 | 11 | | | | | | | 4 | Sivasangari Subramaniam (MAS) | 11 | 11 | 11 |
| | Pürevjavyn Khulan (MGL) | 0 | 4 | 4 | 14 | Noor-ul-Ain Ijaz (PAK) | 3 | 2 | 1 |
| | | | | | 4 | Sivasangari Subramaniam (MAS) | 11 | 11 | 11 |

=== Bottom half ===
==== Section 3 ====
| Round of 32 | Round of 16 | | | | | Quarterfinals |
| | 3 | Chan Sin Yuk (HKG) | 11 | 11 | 11 |
| | 11 | Yeung Weng Chi (MAC) | 8 | 4 | 4 |
| | | | | | | 3 | Chan Sin Yuk (HKG) | 11 | 11 | 11 |
| | | | | | | 5 | Aira Azman (MAS) | 7 | 4 | 4 |
| | 12 | Liu Kwai Chi (MAC) | 0 | 4 | 4 |
| | 5 | Aira Azman (MAS) | 11 | 11 | 11 |

==== Section 4 ====
| Round of 32 | | | | | Round of 16 | | | | | Quarterfinals |
| | | | | | 8 | Akari Midorikawa (JPN) | 11 | 11 | 11 |
| | Bipana Bhlon (NEP) | 11 | 11 | 11 | | Bipana Bhlon (NEP) | 3 | 1 | 5 |
| 16 | Waritsara Chujit (THA) | 7 | 7 | 8 | | | | | | 8 | Akari Midorikawa (JPN) | 5 | 5 | 6 |
| | | | | | | | | | | 2 | Ho Tze Lok (HKG) | 11 | 11 | 11 |
| | | | | | 9 | Noor-ul-Huda Sadiq (PAK) | 2 | 4 | 5 |
| | | | | | 2 | Ho Tze Lok (HKG) | 11 | 11 | 11 |
