= Sepak takraw at the 2022 Asian Games – Men's regu =

Men's regu at the 2022 Asian Games
- Venue: Jinhua Sports Center Gymnasium
- Date: 5–7 October 2023
- Competitors: 35 from 7 nations

Medalists
gold medal	Thailand
silver medal	Malaysia
bronze medal	Philippines
bronze medal	Vietnam

The men's regu sepak takraw competition at the 2022 Asian Games was held at Jinhua Sports Center Gymnasium, Jinhua, China from 5 to 7 October 2023.

== Squads ==
India	Malaysia	Myanmar	Philippines
Niken Singh Khangembam; Akash Yumnam; Henary Singh Wahengbam; Arun; John Meitei Laishram	Zarif Marican; Azlan Alias; Afifuddin Razali; Amirul Zazwan Amir; Syahir Rosdi	Aung Khant Thu; Thant Zin Tun; Min Thant Thu; Shein Wunna Zaw; Ye Htet	Jason Huerte; Mark Joseph Gonzales; Rheyjey Ortouste; Ronsited Gabayeron; Jom Lerry Rafael
Singapore	Thailand	Vietnam	
Afif Safiee; Asy Syariq Khalid; Ramli Saari; Irfain Zurkanaen; Yusof Hasli	Siriwat Sakha; Pattarapong Yupadee; Sittipong Khamchan; Varayut Jantarasena; Pichet Pansan	Nguyễn Hoàng Lân; Ngô Thành Long; Huỳnh Ngọc Sang; Đầu Văn Hoàng; Vương Minh Châu	

== Results ==
All times are China Standard Time (UTC+08:00)

=== Preliminary ===
==== Group A ====
Pos	Team	Pld	W	L	SF	SA	SD	Pts	Qualification
1	Malaysia	2	2	0	4	1	+3	4	Semifinals
2	Vietnam	2	1	1	3	2	+1	2	Semifinals
3	Singapore	2	0	2	0	4	−4	0	

Source: OCA

Date	Time		Score		Set 1	Set 2	Set 3
05 Oct	09:00	Malaysia	2–1	Vietnam	17–21	21–9	21–11
05 Oct	14:00	Malaysia	2–0	Singapore	21–10	21–6	
06 Oct	09:00	Vietnam	2–0	Singapore	21–15	21–15	

==== Group B ====
Pos	Team	Pld	W	L	SF	SA	SD	Pts	Qualification
1	Thailand	3	3	0	6	0	+6	6	Semifinals
2	Philippines	3	2	1	4	2	+2	4	Semifinals
3	Myanmar	3	1	2	2	4	−2	2	
4	India	3	0	3	0	6	−6	0	

Source: OCA

Date	Time		Score		Set 1	Set 2	Set 3
05 Oct	09:00	Thailand	2–0	India	21–12	21–10	
05 Oct	09:00	Philippines	2–0	Myanmar	21–17	21–9	
05 Oct	14:00	India	0–2	Philippines	21–23	17–21	
05 Oct	14:00	Thailand	2–0	Myanmar	21–10	21–7	
06 Oct	09:00	Thailand	2–0	Philippines	21–8	21–10	
06 Oct	09:00	Myanmar	2–0	India	21–15	21–13	

=== Knockout round ===
Semifinals
6 October
Malaysia	2
Philippines	0
6 October
Vietnam	0
Thailand	2

Gold medal match
7 October
Malaysia	0
Thailand	2

==== Semifinals ====
Date	Time		Score		Set 1	Set 2	Set 3
06 Oct	14:00	Malaysia	2–0	Philippines	21–15	21–11	
06 Oct	14:00	Vietnam	0–2	Thailand	5–21	7–21	

==== Gold medal match ====
Date	Time		Score		Set 1	Set 2	Set 3
07 Oct	09:00	Malaysia	0–2	Thailand	15–21	19–21	
