= Karate at the 2022 Asian Games – Women's team kata =

Karate competition

Women's team kata at the 2022 Asian Games
- Venue: Linping Sports Centre Gymnasium
- Date: 6 October 2023
- Competitors: 12 from 4 nations

Medalists
gold medal	Vietnam; Lưu Thị Thu Uyên, Nguyễn Ngọc Trâm, Nguyễn Thị Phương
silver medal	Malaysia; Naccy Nelly Evvaferra, Lovelly Anne Robberth, Niathalia Sherawinnie
bronze medal	Brunei; Rodhyatul Adhwanna, Farhana Najeeha, Farhah Syahirah
bronze medal	Cambodia; Oun Sreyda, Puthea Sreynuch, That Chhenghorng

The women's team kata event at the 2022 Asian Games took place on 8 October 2023 at Linping Sports Centre Gymnasium, Hangzhou, China.

== Schedule ==
All times are China Standard Time (UTC+08:00)

Date	Time	Event
Friday, 6 October 2023	14:30	Round 1
Friday, 6 October 2023	14:30	Gold medal contest

== Squads ==
Brunei	Cambodia	Malaysia	Vietnam
Rodhyatul Adhwanna; Farhana Najeeha; Farhah Syahirah	Oun Sreyda; Puthea Sreynuch; That Chhenghorng	Naccy Nelly Evvaferra; Lovelly Anne Robberth; Niathalia Sherawinnie	Lưu Thị Thu Uyên; Nguyễn Ngọc Trâm; Nguyễn Thị Phương

== Results ==
=== Round 1 ===
==== Pool 1 ====
Rank	Team	Score
1	Malaysia (MAS)	38.8
2	Brunei (BRU)	38.2

==== Pool 2 ====
Rank	Team	Score
1	Vietnam (VIE)	40.8
2	Cambodia (CAM)	38.9

=== Gold medal contest ===
Rank	Team	Score
1	Vietnam (VIE)	42.7
2	Malaysia (MAS)	39.0
