= Sepak takraw at the 2022 Asian Games – Men's team regu =

Men's team regu at the 2022 Asian Games
- Venue: Jinhua Sports Center Gymnasium
- Date: 24–29 September 2023
- Competitors: 71 from 6 nations

Medalists
gold medal	Thailand
silver medal	Malaysia
bronze medal	South Korea
bronze medal	Laos

The men's team regu sepak takraw competition at the 2022 Asian Games is held at Jinhua Sports Center Gymnasium, Jinhua, Zhejiang from 24 to 29 September 2023.

== Squads ==
Indonesia	Japan	Laos	Malaysia
Diky Apriyadi; Syamsul Akmal; Muhammad Hardiansyah Muliang; Dedi Setiawan; Jelki Ladada; Anwar Budiyanto; Saiful Rijal; Muhammad Hafidz; Rusdi; Andi Try Sandi Saputra; Victoria Eka Prasetyo; Abdul Halim Radjiu	Yuki Sato; Seiya Takano; Ryota Haruhara; Toshitaka Naito; Masaki Sasamoto; Wataru Narawa; Daishi Tamaki; Hirokazu Kobayashi; Ryo Masuda; Ryo Nakajima; Ikki Mito; Yota Ichikawa	Daophachanh Moungsin; Sommanyvanh Phakonekham; Daovy Xanavongxay; Phitthasanh Bounpaseuth; Noum Souvannalith; Po Masopha; Yothin Sombatphouthone; Kantana Nanthisen; Phonesavanh Phimmachak; Adong Phoumisin; Soukkaserm Chanthahieng	Zarif Marican; Noraizat Mohd Nordin; Azlan Alias; Afifuddin Razali; Amirul Zazwan Amir; Aidil Aiman Azwawi; Hairul Hazizi Haidzir; Farhan Adam; Khairol Zaman Hamir Akhbar; Haziq Hairul Nizam; Syahir Rosdi; Zaim Razali
South Korea	Thailand		
Lim Tae-gyun; Lee Jun-uk; Lee Min-ju; Seo Seung-beom; Kim Jung-man; Kim Hyun-soo; Im An-soo; Seonwoo Young-su; Jeong Ha-sung; Kim Young-cheol; Lee Woo-jin; Lee Jae-seong	Siriwat Sakha; Thawisak Thongsai; Pattarapong Yupadee; Rachan Viphan; Pornthep Tinbangbon; Sittipong Khamchan; Varayut Jantarasena; Wichan Temkort; Kritsanapong Nontakote; Pichet Pansan; Tanaphon Sapyen; Marukin Phanmakon		

== Results ==
All times are China Standard Time (UTC+08:00)

=== Preliminary ===
==== Group A ====
Pos	Team	Pld	W	L	MF	MA	MD	Pts	Qualification
1	Thailand	2	2	0	6	0	+6	4	Semifinals
2	Laos	2	1	1	2	4	−2	2	Semifinals
3	Japan	2	0	2	1	5	−4	0	

Source: OCA

Date	Time		Score		Regu 1			Regu 2			Regu 3		
Date	Time		Score		Set 1	Set 2	Set 3	Set 1	Set 2	Set 3	Set 1	Set 2	Set 3
24 Sep	09:00	Thailand	3–0	Laos	2–0			2–0			2–0		
24 Sep	09:00	Thailand	3–0	Laos	21–10	21–7		21–11	21–7		21–10	21–11	
25 Sep	09:00	Japan	1–2	Laos	1–2			0–2			2–1		
25 Sep	09:00	Japan	1–2	Laos	18–21	21–18	18–21	17–21	14–21		21–7	16–21	21–6
26 Sep	09:00	Thailand	3–0	Japan	2–0			2–0			2–0		
26 Sep	09:00	Thailand	3–0	Japan	21–10	21–11		21–5	21–18		21–5	21–13	

==== Group B ====
Pos	Team	Pld	W	L	MF	MA	MD	Pts	Qualification
1	Malaysia	2	2	0	5	1	+4	4	Semifinals
2	South Korea	2	1	1	2	4	−2	2	Semifinals
3	Indonesia	2	0	2	2	4	−2	0	

Source: OCA

Date	Time		Score		Regu 1			Regu 2			Regu 3		
Date	Time		Score		Set 1	Set 2	Set 3	Set 1	Set 2	Set 3	Set 1	Set 2	Set 3
24 Sep	09:00	South Korea	2–1	Indonesia	1–2			2–0			2–0		
24 Sep	09:00	South Korea	2–1	Indonesia	15–21	21–10	15–21	21–15	21–14		21–10	21–12	
25 Sep	09:00	Malaysia	2–1	Indonesia	0–2			2–1			2–0		
25 Sep	09:00	Malaysia	2–1	Indonesia	15–21	19–21		20–22	21–17	23–21	21–10	21–12	
26 Sep	09:00	Malaysia	3–0	South Korea	2–0			2–1			2–0		
26 Sep	09:00	Malaysia	3–0	South Korea	21–15	21–11		17–21	21–18	21–19	21–10	21–12	

=== Knockout match ===
Semifinals
27 September
Thailand	2
South Korea	0
27 September
Laos	0
Malaysia	2

Gold medal match
29 September
Thailand	2
Malaysia	0

==== Semifinals ====
Date	Time		Score		Regu 1			Regu 2			Regu 3		
Date	Time		Score		Set 1	Set 2	Set 3	Set 1	Set 2	Set 3	Set 1	Set 2	Set 3
27 Sep	09:00	Thailand	2–0	South Korea	2–0			2–0					
27 Sep	09:00	Thailand	2–0	South Korea	21–9	21–11		21–8	21–13				
27 Sep	14:00	Laos	0–2	Malaysia	0–2			0–2					
27 Sep	14:00	Laos	0–2	Malaysia	17–21	19–21		14–21	14–21				

==== Gold medal match ====
Date	Time		Score		Regu 1			Regu 2			Regu 3		
Date	Time		Score		Set 1	Set 2	Set 3	Set 1	Set 2	Set 3	Set 1	Set 2	Set 3
29 Sep	14:00	Thailand	2–0	Malaysia	2–0			2–0					
29 Sep	14:00	Thailand	2–0	Malaysia	21–15	21–14		21–13	21–18				
