= Sailing at the 2022 Asian Games – Women's RS:X =

Women's RS:X at the 2022 Asian Games
- Venue: Xiangshan Sailing Centre
- Date: 21–26 September 2023
- Competitors: 4 from 4 nations

Medalists
gold medal	Siripon Kaewduang-ngam	Thailand
silver medal	Ngai Wai Yan	Hong Kong
bronze medal	Tengku Nuraini	Malaysia

The women's RS:X competition at the 2022 Asian Games was held from 21 to 26 September 2023 at Xiangshan Sailing Centre in Ningbo.

== Schedule ==
All times are China Standard Time (UTC+08:00)

Date	Time	Event
Thursday, 21 September 2023	14:10	Race 1–3
Friday, 22 September 2023	11:00	Race 4–6
Saturday, 23 September 2023	14:10	Race 7–8
Sunday, 24 September 2023	11:00	Race 9–10
Monday, 25 September 2023	11:10	Race 11–12
Tuesday, 26 September 2023	14:00	Race 13–14

== Results ==
Legend

- DNF — Did not finish

Rank	Athlete	Race														Total
Rank	Athlete	1	2	3	4	5	6	7	8	9	10	11	12	13	14	Total
1st place, gold medalist(s)	Siripon Kaewduang-ngam (THA)	~~(2)~~	2	1	1	1	2	2	1	1	1	2	2	1	1	18
2nd place, silver medalist(s)	Ngai Wai Yan (HKG)	1	1	~~(2)~~	2	2	1	1	2	2	2	1	1	2	2	20
3rd place, bronze medalist(s)	Tengku Nuraini (MAS)	~~(5)~~; DNF	4	3	3	3	4	3	3	3	3	4	3	4	3	43
4	Ishwariya Ganesh (IND)	3	3	~~(5)~~; DNF	4	5 DNF	3	4	4	4	4	3	4	3	4	48
