= Diving at the 2022 Asian Games – Men's 10 metre platform =

Diving competition

Men's 10 metre platform at the 2022 Asian Games
- Venue: Hangzhou Olympic Expo Aquatics Center
- Date: 4 October 2023
- Competitors: 13 from 10 nations

Medalists
gold medal	Yang Hao	China
silver medal	Bai Yuming	China
bronze medal	Rikuto Tamai	Japan

The men's 10 metre platform competition at the 2022 Asian Games took place on 4 October 2023 at Hangzhou Olympic Expo Center.

== Schedule ==
All times are China Standard Time (UTC+08:00)

Date	Time	Event
Wednesday, 4 October 2023	13:00	Preliminary
Wednesday, 4 October 2023	19:30	Final

== Results ==
=== Preliminary ===
Rank	Athlete	Dive						Total
Rank	Athlete	1	2	3	4	5	6	Total
1	Bai Yuming (CHN)	72.00	95.40	96.90	72.00	83.25	91.20	510.75
2	Yang Hao (CHN)	80.00	103.25	61.20	84.60	83.20	83.25	495.50
3	Rikuto Tamai (JPN)	76.80	74.25	68.45	64.80	76.50	77.40	438.20
4	Jellson Jabillin (MAS)	67.50	65.60	67.20	81.00	70.40	72.00	423.70
5	Bertrand Rhodict Lises (MAS)	75.00	76.80	59.40	44.55	76.50	68.80	401.05
6	Kim Yeong-taek (KOR)	67.50	68.80	48.60	89.25	64.80	51.00	389.95
7	Yi Jae-gyeong (KOR)	61.50	64.00	60.00	42.90	67.20	72.00	367.60
8	Max Lee (SGP)	58.50	62.40	64.00	72.60	44.20	65.60	367.30
9	Igor Myalin (UZB)	59.20	45.90	67.20	52.80	37.00	79.20	341.30
10	Mohammad Moghaddasi (IRI)	48.00	35.20	37.95	37.40	34.65	57.60	250.80
11	Siddharth Pardeshi (IND)	36.00	33.60	57.75	24.00	32.00	51.20	234.55
12	Zhang Hoi (MAC)	20.90	31.50	37.05	36.80	32.00	39.60	197.85
13	Adithep Khopuechklang (THA)	27.00	16.80	40.50	26.60	42.90	40.80	194.60

=== Final ===
Rank	Athlete	Dive						Total
Rank	Athlete	1	2	3	4	5	6	Total
1st place, gold medalist(s)	Yang Hao (CHN)	92.80	99.75	102.00	66.60	89.60	103.60	554.35
2nd place, silver medalist(s)	Bai Yuming (CHN)	72.00	95.40	91.80	102.60	42.55	91.20	495.55
3rd place, bronze medalist(s)	Rikuto Tamai (JPN)	84.80	84.15	61.05	68.40	86.70	95.40	480.50
4	Bertrand Rhodict Lises (MAS)	72.00	65.60	61.05	85.80	81.60	68.80	434.85
5	Jellson Jabillin (MAS)	69.00	81.60	63.00	48.60	70.40	70.40	403.00
6	Igor Myalin (UZB)	72.00	62.90	72.00	56.10	73.50	52.20	388.70
7	Kim Yeong-taek (KOR)	75.00	67.20	43.20	71.75	70.20	49.30	376.65
8	Max Lee (SGP)	66.00	60.80	67.20	52.80	56.10	73.60	376.50
9	Yi Jae-gyeong (KOR)	67.50	38.40	69.00	69.30	52.80	72.00	369.00
10	Mohammad Moghaddasi (IRI)	45.00	32.00	59.40	40.80	42.90	60.80	280.90
11	Siddharth Pardeshi (IND)	40.50	57.60	23.10	54.00	33.60	59.20	268.00
12	Zhang Hoi (MAC)	27.55	35.10	39.90	42.55	27.00	40.80	212.90
