= Esports at the 2022 Asian Games – Arena of Valor =

Arena of Valor at the 2022 Asian Games
- Venue: Hangzhou Esports Center
- Date: 24–26 September 2023
- Competitors: 86 from 15 nations

Medalists
gold medal	China; Sun Linwei, Lin Heng, Chi Xiaoming, Xu Bicheng, Jiang Tao, Luo Siyuan
silver medal	Malaysia; Nicholas Ng, Yong Zhan Quan, Lai Chia Chien, Ong Jun Yang, Chong Han Hui, Eng Jun Hao
bronze medal	Thailand; Vatcharanan Thaworn, Chayut Suebka, Kawee Wachiraphas, Anusak Manpdong, Sorawat Boonphrom

The Arena of Valor event at the 2022 Asian Games took place from 24 to 26 September 2023 at Hangzhou Esports Center in Hangzhou, China.

This tournament awarded the first-ever gold medal for esports, which debuted as a regular sport for this edition of the games.

An "Asian Games Version" of Arena of Valor which reduced the "amount of socialization, commercialization, and non-battle systems" from the standard game was made specifically for the tournament.

== Schedule ==
All times are China Standard Time (UTC+08:00)

Date	Time	Event
Sunday, 24 September 2023	09:00	Group round
Sunday, 24 September 2023	19:00	Quarterfinals
Monday, 25 September 2023	09:00	Semifinals
Tuesday, 26 September 2023	14:00	Bronze medal match
Tuesday, 26 September 2023	19:00	Final

== Seeding ==
A qualification tournament called AESF Road to Asian Games 2022 was played in Macau, China from 27 June to 2 July 2023. The results of this tournament were used to determine the seedings for the Games.

Central Asia	East Asia	Southeast Asia	West & South Asia
Kazakhstan (2–0)	China (2–0)	Malaysia (6–0)	Jordan (2–0)
Kyrgyzstan (1–1)	Hong Kong (1–1)	Myanmar (5–1)	Nepal (1–1)
Uzbekistan (0–2)	Macau (0–2)	Thailand (4–2)	Sri Lanka (0–2)
		Laos (3–3)	
		Singapore (2–4)	
		Philippines (1–5)	
		Vietnam (0–6)	

Kazakhstan, China, Malaysia and Nepal qualified directly to the quarterfinal stage.

== Squads ==
China	Chinese Taipei	Hong Kong	Kazakhstan
Sun Linwei; Lin Heng; Chi Xiaoming; Xu Bicheng; Jiang Tao; Luo Siyuan	Wu Che-hung; Yu Yan-lin; Chan Cheng-hsun; Huang Tzu-jui; Chen Jun-xiao; Chen Meng-pu	Justin Chan; Chui Sum Ki; Cheng Ka Hin; Kwok Ho Wa; Lam Chiu Yu; Pang Ka Kit	Arsen Orazkhanov; Nurkonar Bazarali; Akzhan Dauletuly; Zhandaulet Zhaxybay; Dias Kuttybek
Kyrgyzstan	Laos	Macau	Malaysia
Kubanychbek Zhanybek Uulu; Altynbek Abdyraimov; Kubanychbek Abdiraimov; Erlis Batyrbekov; Erbol Bekzat Uulu	Ded Aloun Rattana; Veelakone Inthilad; Bounkeuth Khanmalay; Phokham Korsaphankham; Khampeng Banluesack	Lam Ka Chu; Lei Kuan Tat; Luis Filipe Chiang; Hoi Chon Kit; Cheang Cheong Nam; Si Tou Chi Kong	Nicholas Ng; Yong Zhan Quan; Lai Chia Chien; Ong Jun Yang; Chong Han Hui; Eng Jun Hao
Myanmar	Nepal	Philippines	Tajikistan
Tun Aung Kyaw; Kyaw Than Oo; Sai Saim Imm Kham; Hein Htet Naing; Hein Zaw Oo; Phone Naing	Insang Limbu; Swastik Maharjan; Bijay Rai; Suyog Raj Paudel; Sushank Kumar Roy; Aayush Basnet	Miguel Klarenz Banaag; Maynard Limon; Cedrik Santos; Dragon Heart Dajao; Eleazar Salle; Alfonso Marcus Valmores	Dilshod Kholov; Ramziyor Khorkashov; Murod Mukhtorov; Suhrob Arbobov; Karimjon Mukhtorov; Manuchekhr Benazirzoda
Thailand	Uzbekistan	Vietnam	
Vatcharanan Thaworn; Chayut Suebka; Kawee Wachiraphas; Anusak Manpdong; Sorawat Boonphrom	Artur Shakirov; Farrukh Tokhtabaev; Daniil Verklov; Mukhammadamin Salokhiddinov; Abduaziz Omonillaev; Sabina Ibragimova	Huỳnh Phương Ngân; Nguyễn Đức Việt; Nguyễn Ngọc Anh; Đặng Huỳnh Trường; Nguyễn Sỹ Tuấn Linh; Nguyễn Thị Phương Yến	

== Results ==
Legend

- WD — Won by withdrawal

=== Group round ===
==== Group A ====
Pos	Team	Pld	W	L	Pts	Qualification
1	Myanmar	2	2	0	2	Quarterfinals
2	Macau	2	1	1	1	
3	Kyrgyzstan	2	0	2	0	

Source: OCA

	Score	
Myanmar	1–0	Kyrgyzstan
Myanmar	1–0	Macau
Kyrgyzstan	0–1	Macau

==== Group B ====
Pos	Team	Pld	W	L	Pts	Qualification
1	Hong Kong	2	2	0	2	Quarterfinals
2	Chinese Taipei	2	1	1	1	
3	Laos	2	0	2	0	

Source: OCA

	Score	
Chinese Taipei	WD	Laos
Chinese Taipei	0–1	Hong Kong
Laos	0–1	Hong Kong

==== Group C ====
Pos	Team	Pld	W	L	Pts	Qualification
1	Vietnam	2	2	0	2	Quarterfinals
2	Uzbekistan	2	1	1	1	
3	Tajikistan	2	0	2	0	

Source: OCA

	Score	
Tajikistan	0–1	Uzbekistan
Uzbekistan	0–1	Vietnam
Tajikistan	0–1	Vietnam

==== Group D ====
Pos	Team	Pld	W	L	Pts	Qualification
1	Thailand	1	1	0	1	Quarterfinals
2	Philippines	1	0	1	0	

Source: OCA

	Score	
Philippines	0–1	Thailand

=== Knockout round ===
Quarterfinals
Malaysia	2
Hong Kong	0
Vietnam	2
Kazakhstan	0
China	2
Myanmar	0
Thailand	2
Nepal	0

Semifinals
Malaysia	2
Vietnam	0
China	2
Thailand	0

Final
Malaysia	0
China	2
Bronze medal match
Vietnam	0
Thailand	2
