= Diving at the 2014 Asian Games – Men's 3 metre springboard =

Men's 3 metre springboard at the 2014 Asian Games
- Venue: Munhak Park Tae-hwan Aquatics Center
- Date: 2 October 2014
- Competitors: 12 from 7 nations

Medalists
gold medal	Cao Yuan	China
silver medal	He Chao	China
bronze medal	Sho Sakai	Japan

The men's 3 metre springboard diving competition at the 2014 Asian Games in Incheon was held on 2 October at the Munhak Park Tae-hwan Aquatics Center.

== Schedule ==
All times are Korea Standard Time (UTC+09:00)

Date	Time	Event
Thursday, 2 October 2014	10:00	Preliminary
Thursday, 2 October 2014	14:10	Final

== Results ==
=== Preliminary ===
Rank	Athlete	Dive						Total
Rank	Athlete	1	2	3	4	5	6	Total
1	He Chao (CHN)	85.00	79.90	87.50	84.60	81.90	95.00	513.90
2	Cao Yuan (CHN)	86.70	85.00	95.00	78.75	68.40	91.00	504.85
3	Kim Yeong-nam (KOR)	72.85	76.50	75.00	84.00	59.40	70.50	438.25
4	Ken Terauchi (JPN)	67.50	72.00	70.95	72.00	61.20	74.40	418.05
5	Ahmad Amsyar Azman (MAS)	66.65	64.50	52.70	75.25	87.40	71.40	417.90
6	Ooi Tze Liang (MAS)	58.90	70.95	75.25	57.80	70.20	74.80	407.90
7	Sho Sakai (JPN)	67.50	67.50	72.85	67.50	63.00	69.30	407.65
8	Park Ji-ho (KOR)	68.20	66.00	66.30	67.50	63.00	67.50	398.50
9	Timothy Lee (SIN)	64.50	49.60	63.00	42.00	61.50	58.80	339.40
10	Abdulrahman Abbas (KUW)	58.50	46.50	57.00	49.50	63.00	44.95	319.45
11	Leong Kam Cheong (MAC)	54.00	49.20	48.00	51.80	48.75	45.60	297.35
12	Hasan Qali (KUW)	43.50	49.50	50.40	51.15	60.00	36.75	291.30

=== Final ===
Rank	Athlete	Dive						Total
Rank	Athlete	1	2	3	4	5	6	Total
1st place, gold medalist(s)	Cao Yuan (CHN)	86.70	85.00	81.70	94.50	90.00	85.75	523.65
2nd place, silver medalist(s)	He Chao (CHN)	86.70	81.60	91.00	81.00	78.00	85.50	503.80
3rd place, bronze medalist(s)	Sho Sakai (JPN)	72.00	75.00	75.95	76.50	84.00	72.60	456.05
4	Kim Yeong-nam (KOR)	74.40	79.90	72.00	73.50	69.30	70.50	439.60
5	Ken Terauchi (JPN)	67.50	72.00	74.25	69.00	73.10	74.40	430.25
6	Park Ji-ho (KOR)	74.40	67.50	76.50	72.00	67.50	70.50	428.40
7	Ooi Tze Liang (MAS)	63.55	79.20	84.00	71.40	52.20	74.80	425.15
8	Ahmad Amsyar Azman (MAS)	74.40	63.00	69.70	78.75	45.60	71.40	402.85
9	Hasan Qali (KUW)	60.00	57.00	49.20	65.10	58.50	52.50	342.30
10	Timothy Lee (SIN)	67.50	65.10	61.50	22.50	63.00	61.60	341.20
11	Abdulrahman Abbas (KUW)	54.00	41.85	43.50	36.00	51.00	62.00	288.35
12	Leong Kam Cheong (MAC)	49.50	46.80	54.00	39.20	50.00	42.00	281.50
