= Zhou Yu (cyclist) =

Chinese cyclist

Personal information
- Born: 5 January 1999 (age 27) China

Cycling career
- Sport: Cycling
- Discipline: Track
Medal record
Men's track cycling
Representing China
Asian Games
Gold medal – first place	2018 Jakarta	Team sprint
Gold medal – first place	2022 Hangzhou	Keirin
Silver medal – second place	2022 Hangzhou	Sprint
Silver medal – second place	2022 Hangzhou	Team sprint
Asian Championships
Silver medal – second place	2019 Jakarta	Team sprint
Silver medal – second place	2020 Jincheon	Team sprint
Silver medal – second place	2023 Nilai	Team sprint

Zhou Yu (born 5 January 1999) is a Chinese cyclist.

He competed in the men's sprint, men's team sprint, and men's keirin events at the 2024 Summer Olympics.
