= Rikuto Tamai =

Japanese diver (born 2006)

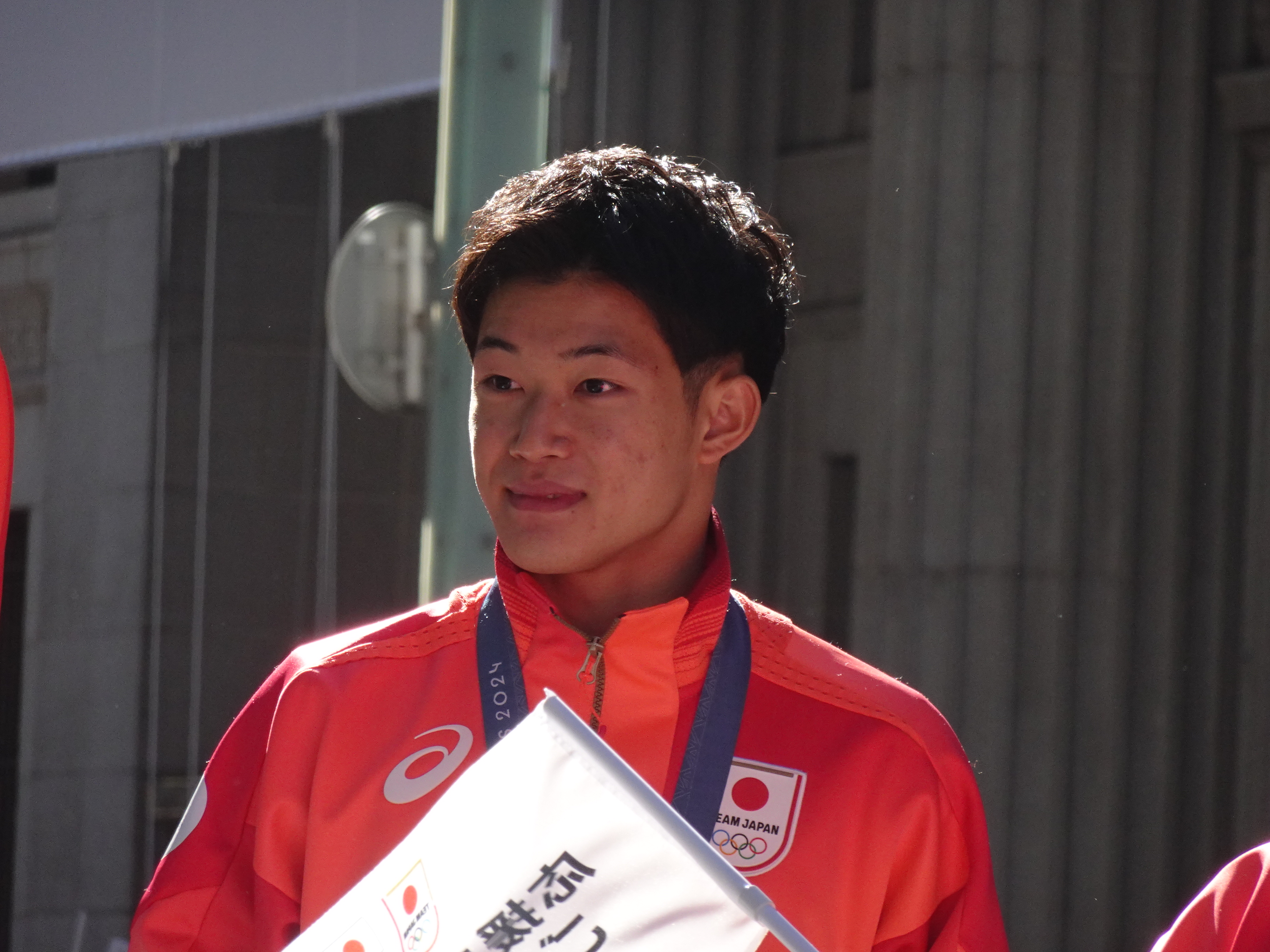
- Tamai at Paris 2024 Summer Olympians and Paralympians Japan National Team parade event on November 30, 2024

Personal information
- Nationality: Japan
- Born: 11 September 2006 (age 20) Takarazuka, Japan

Sport
- Sport: Diving
Medal record
Men's diving
Representing Japan
Olympic Games
Silver medal – second place	2024 Paris	10 m platform
World Championships
Silver medal – second place	2022 Budapest	10 m platform
Asian Games
Silver medal – second place	2026 Aichi–Nagoya	10 m platform
Bronze medal – third place	2022 Hangzhou	10 m platform

Rikuto Tamai (Japanese: 玉井 陸斗 Tamai Rikuto, born 11 September 2006) is a Japanese diver. He won Japan's first Olympic medal in diving at the 2024 Paris Olympics.

In April 2019, he became the youngest ever national indoor diving champion. In September of the same year, he became the youngest ever national diving champion.

He was one of the youngest Japanese competitors at the 2020 Summer Olympic Games in Tokyo.

At the 2024 Summer Olympics, Tamai won a silver medal in the men's 10 m platform event, with a score of 507.65. This was Japan’s first ever Olympics medal in diving.
