= Diving at the 2022 Asian Games – Men's synchronized 3 metre springboard =

Diving competition

Men's synchronized 3 metre springboard at the 2022 Asian Games
- Venue: Hangzhou Olympic Expo Aquatics Center
- Date: 30 September 2023
- Competitors: 12 from 6 nations

Medalists
gold medal	Yan Siyu; He Chao	China
silver medal	Yi Jae-gyeong; Woo Ha-ram	South Korea
bronze medal	Syafiq Puteh; Ooi Tze Liang	Malaysia

The men's synchronized 3 metre springboard competition at the 2022 Asian Games took place on 30 September 2023 at Hangzhou Olympic Expo Center.

== Schedule ==
All times are China Standard Time (UTC+08:00)

Date	Time	Event
Saturday, 30 September 2023	19:30	Final

== Results ==
Rank	Team	Dive						Total
Rank	Team	1	2	3	4	5	6	Total
1st place, gold medalist(s)	China (CHN); Yan Siyu; He Chao	52.20	52.80	89.76	72.42	89.25	66.12	422.55
2nd place, silver medalist(s)	South Korea (KOR); Yi Jae-gyeong; Woo Ha-ram	51.00	49.80	72.54	79.56	73.50	66.60	393.00
3rd place, bronze medalist(s)	Malaysia (MAS); Syafiq Puteh; Ooi Tze Liang	49.20	46.80	67.50	67.50	70.68	78.54	380.22
4	Japan (JPN); Haruki Suyama; Yuto Araki	50.40	50.40	71.61	49.98	72.42	73.50	368.31
5	Uzbekistan (UZB); Vyacheslav Kachanov; Igor Myalin	47.40	45.00	67.50	66.96	63.90	66.30	357.06
6	India (IND); London Singh Hemam; Siddharth Pardeshi	45.00	31.80	45.57	46.80	53.10	57.60	279.87
