= Brunei at the 2022 Asian Games =

- IOC code: BRU
- NOC: Brunei Darussalam National Olympic Council
- Website: www.bruneiolympic.org

in Hangzhou 19 September 2023 – 8 October 2023
- Competitors: 11 in 3 sports
- Flag bearers: Mohammad Adi Salihin; Basma Lachkar
- Officials: 10
- Medals: Gold 0 Silver 1 Bronze 1 Total 2

Asian Games appearances (overview)
- 1990; 1994; 1998; 2002; 2006; 2010; 2014; 2018; 2022; 2026

Brunei competed at the 2022 Asian Games in Hangzhou, Zhejiang, China, which was held from 23 September 2023 to 8 October 2023. The delegation had 21 members, 11 of which were athletes and the rest were officials.

In this edition Brunei won their first ever Asian Games silver medal courtesy of wushu practitioner Basma Lachkar.

== Competitors ==
The following is a list of the number of competitors representing Brunei that will participate at the Asian Games:

Sport	Men	Women	Total
Karate ()	1	3	4
Weightlifting ()	0	1	1
Wushu ()	4	2	6
Total	5	6	11

== Medalists ==
The following Bruneian competitors won medals at the Games.

=== Silver ===
No.	Medal	Name	Sport	Event	Date
1	Silver	Basma Lachkar	Wushu	Women's taijiquan	28 September

=== Bronze ===
No.	Medal	Name	Sport	Event	Date
1	Bronze	Rodhyatul Adhwanna; Farhana Najeeha; Farhan Syahirah	Karate	Women's team	5 October

== Karate ==
=== Kata ===
Athlete	Event	Round 1		Round 2		Final/BM	
Athlete	Event	Opposition Score	Rank	Opposition Score	Rank	Opposition Score	Rank
Farhan Syahirah	Women's Individual	35.70	5	Did not advance			
Rodhyatul Adhwanna; Farhana Najeeha; Farhan Syahirah	Women's Team	38.20	2	Did not advance			3rd place, bronze medalist(s)

=== Kumite ===
Athlete	Event	Round of 32	Round of 16	Quarterfinals	Semifinals/Repechage	Final/BM	
Athlete	Event	Opposition Score	Opposition Score	Opposition Score	Opposition Score	Opposition Score	Rank
Harith Dahlan	Men's kumite -60 kg	Bye	J C Lachica (PHI); L 1–3	Did not advance			

== Weightlifting ==
Brunei is represented by a single weightlifter at the 2022 Asian Games – Jurelena binti Juna. Juna is backed by her coach Muhammad Hadi Dinie bin Abdul Rahman.

Women

Athlete	Event	Snatch					Clean & Jerk					Total	Rank
Athlete	Event	1	2	3	Result	Rank	1	2	3	Result	Rank	Total	Rank
Jurelena Juna	64 kg	75	78	81	81	10	95	100	~~105~~	100	10	181	10

== Wushu ==
=== Taolu ===
Athlete	Event	Event 1		Event 2		Total	Rank
Athlete	Event	Result	Rank	Result	Rank	Total	Rank
Mohammad Roslan	Men's nanquan and nangun	9.713	5	9.716	4	19.429	4
Majdurano Majallah	Men's nanquan and nangun	9.463	14	9.680	11	19.143	14
Hosea Wong	Men's taijiquan and taijijian	9.730	9	9.380	13	19.110	13
Walid Lachkar	Men's daoshu and gunshu	9.376	10	9.390	10	18.766	10
Basma Lachkar	Women's taijiquan and taijijian	9.746	2	9.756	2	19.502	2nd place, silver medalist(s)
Lim Yee Sean	Women's taijiquan and taijijian	9.436	11	9.060	10	18.496	10
