= Diving at the 2022 Asian Games – Men's synchronized 10 metre platform =

Diving competition

Men's synchronized 10 metre platform at the 2022 Asian Games
- Venue: Hangzhou Olympic Expo Aquatics Center
- Date: 1 October 2023
- Competitors: 8 from 4 nations

Medalists
gold medal	Yang Hao; Lian Junjie	China
silver medal	Yi Jae-gyeong; Kim Yeong-nam	South Korea
bronze medal	Bertrand Rhodict Lises; Enrique Maccartney Harold	Malaysia

The men's synchronized 10 metre platform competition at the 2022 Asian Games took place on 1 October 2023 at the Hangzhou Olympic Expo Center.

== Schedule ==
All times are China Standard Time (UTC+08:00)

Date	Time	Event
Sunday, 1 October 2023	19:30	Final

== Results ==
Rank	Team	Dive						Total
Rank	Team	1	2	3	4	5	6	Total
1st place, gold medalist(s)	China (CHN); Yang Hao; Lian Junjie	58.80	57.60	87.36	93.84	91.80	103.23	492.63
2nd place, silver medalist(s)	South Korea (KOR); Yi Jae-gyeong; Kim Yeong-nam	50.40	47.40	67.50	72.96	73.92	75.60	387.78
3rd place, bronze medalist(s)	Malaysia (MAS); Bertrand Rhodict Lises; Enrique Maccartney Harold	51.60	47.40	72.00	73.80	72.96	68.31	386.07
4	Macau (MAC); Zhang Hoi; He Heung Wing	38.40	38.40	35.40	35.19	34.80	39.60	221.79
