= Sho Sakai =

Japanese diver (born 1992)

Personal information
- Nationality: Japanese
- Born: 22 August 1992 (age 34) Sagamihara, Japan
- Height: 1.71 m (5 ft 7 in)
- Weight: 58 kg (128 lb)

Sport
- Sport: Diving
- Event: 3 metre springboard
Medal record
Men's diving
Representing Japan
World Championships
Bronze medal – third place	2025 Singapore	Team
Asian Games
Bronze medal – third place	2014 Incheon	3 m springboard
Bronze medal – third place	2018 Jakarta-Palembang	3 m synchro
Bronze medal – third place	2026 Aichi–Nagoya	3 m springboard
Summer Universiade
Bronze medal – third place	2011 Shenzhen	3 m synchro

Sho Sakai (坂井 丞, Sakai Shō; born 22 August 1992) is a Japanese diver. He competed in the men's 3 metre springboard at the 2016 Summer Olympics, where he was eliminated in the preliminary rounds, finishing 22nd out of 29 competitors.

He has qualified to represent Japan at the 2020 Summer Olympics.
