= Wong Chi Him =

Hong Kong squash player (born 1994)

Personal information
- Born: April 8, 1994 (age 32) Hong Kong, China
- Height: 178 cm (5 ft 10 in)
- Weight: 60 kg (132 lb)

Sport
- Country: Hong Kong, China
- Handedness: Right Handed
- Coached by: Abdul Faheem Khan
- Retired: Active
- Racquet used: Head

Men's singles
- Highest ranking: No. 79 (April 2017)
- Current ranking: No. 99 (October 2025)
- Title: 11

Wong Chi Him (born 8 April 1994) is a Hong Kong professional squash player. He reached a career high ranking of 79 in the world during April 2017.

== Biography ==
In 2017 he won the Malaysian Squash Tour and the Squash Challenge Cup PSA professional tournaments.

In July 2025, he won his 10th PSA title after securing victory in the Eastside Open during the 2024–25 PSA Squash Tour. In October 2025, he won his 11th PSA title after securing victory in the KCC PSA Challenge Cup during the 2025–26 PSA Squash Tour.
