= Andrey Chugay =

Kazakhstani cyclist

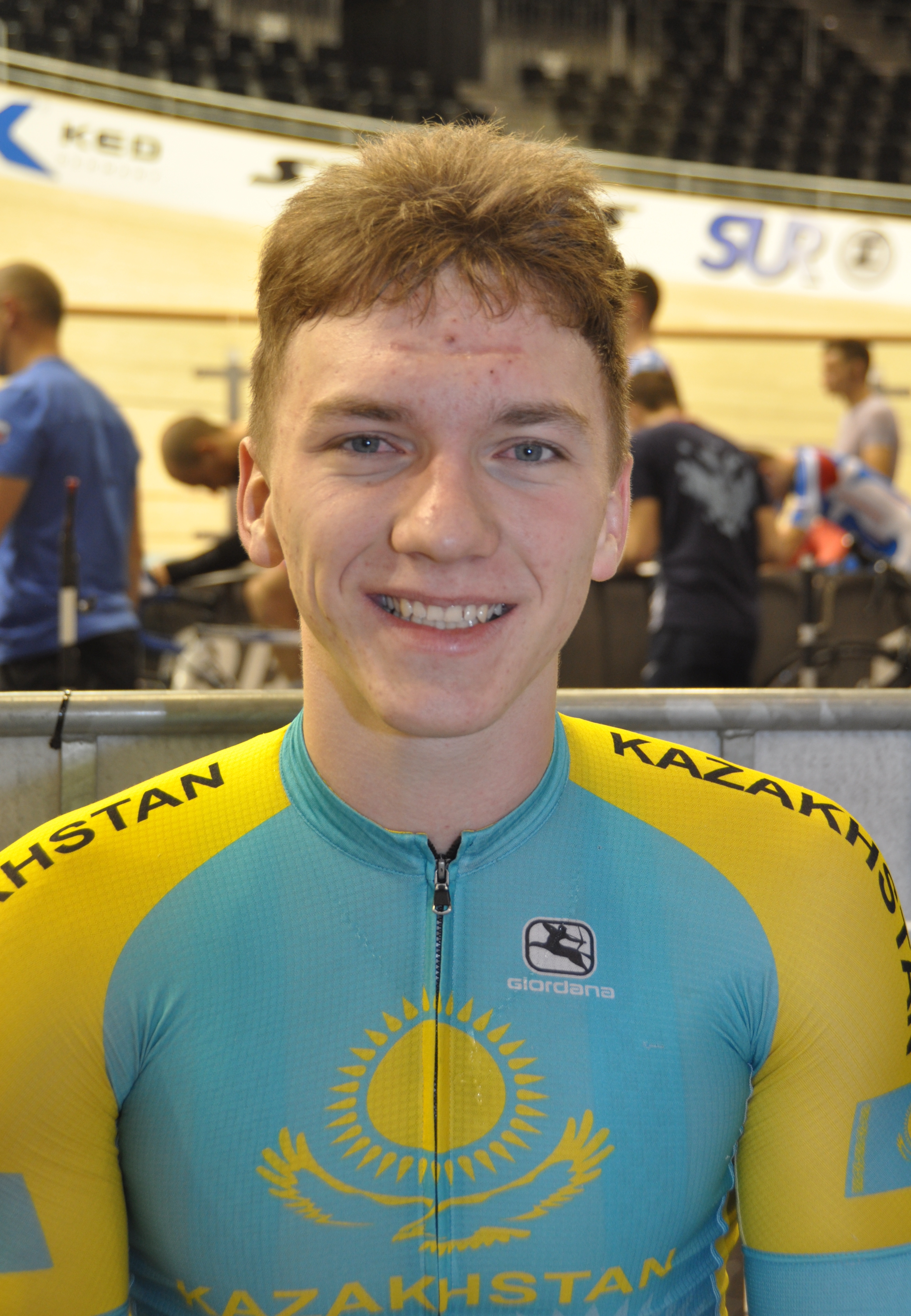
- Chugay in 2018

Personal information
- Born: 17 January 2000 (age 26) Kazakhstan

Cycling career
- Sport: Cycling
- Discipline: Track
Medal record
Men's track cycling
Representing Kazakhstan
Asian Championships
Gold medal – first place	2020 Jincheon	Time trial
Bronze medal – third place	2022 New Delhi	Sprint
World Junior Championships
Bronze medal – third place	2018 Aigle	Keirin

Andrey Chugay (Андрей Чугай, born 17 January 2000) is a Kazakhstani cyclist. He competed in the men's sprint and men's keirin events at the 2024 Summer Olympics.
