= He Chao (diver) =

Chinese diver

Personal information
- Nationality: Chinese
- Born: February 11, 1992 (age 34) Zhanjiang, Guangdong, China
- Height: 5 ft 6 in (1.68 m)
- Weight: 134 lb (61 kg)

Sport
- Country: China
- Sport: Diving
- Event(s): 3 m, 3 m synchro
Medal record
| Event | 1st | 2nd | 3rd |
|---|---|---|---|
| Olympic Games | – | – | – |
| World Championships | 1 | 1 | – |
| Asian Games | 2 | 1 | – |
| Total | 3 | 2 | 0 |
World Championships
| Gold medal – first place | 2015 Kazan | 3 m springboard |
| Silver medal – second place | 2017 Budapest | 1 m springboard |
Asian Games
| Gold medal – first place | 2022 Hangzhou | 3 m synchro |
| Gold medal – first place | 2014 Busan | 1 m springboard |
| Silver medal – second place | 2014 Busan | 3 m springboard |

He Chao (Chinese: 何超; pinyin: Hé Chāo, born 11 February 1992) is a Chinese diver. He is the 2014 Asian Games gold medal Champion in the 1 m springboard, and silver medal in 3 m springboard., and 2022 Asian Games gold medal Champion in the 3 m synchro along with teammate partner Yan Siyu.

He is the younger brother of Chinese diver He Chong.

Awards
| Preceded by (China) Cao Yuan | FINA Male Diver of the Year; 2015 | Succeeded by (China) Chen Aisen |
