= Bertrand Rhodict Lises =

Malaysian diver (born 2005)

Personal information
- Full name: Bertrand Rhodict Anak Lises
- Born: 28 May 2005 (age 21) Sarawak, Malaysia
- Height: 168 cm (5 ft 6 in)

Sport
- Country: Malaysia
- Sport: Diving
Medal record
Men's diving
Representing Malaysia
Asian Championships
Silver medal – second place	2025 Ahmedabad	10 m synchro
Asian Games
Bronze medal – third place	2022 Hangzhou	10 m synchro
Southeast Asian Games
Silver medal – second place	2023 Phnom Penh	10 m platform
Bronze medal – third place	2021 Hanoi	1 m springboard

Bertrand Rhodict Anak Lises (born 28 May 2005) is a Malaysian diver. He competes in 1m springboard, 3m springboard, 10m platform, mixed synchronized diving 3m and synchronized diving 3m. He was the flag bearer of Malaysia at the 2024 Summer Olympics opening ceremony alongside sailor Nur Shazrin Mohd Latif.

Olympic Games
Preceded by Lee Zii Jia; Goh Liu Ying	Flagbearer for Malaysia (with Nur Shazrin Mohamad Latif); Paris 2024	Succeeded by Incumbent
