= Sepak takraw at the 2022 Asian Games – Women's quadrant =

Women's quadrant at the 2022 Asian Games
- Venue: Jinhua Sports Center Gymnasium
- Date: 1–4 October 2023
- Competitors: 48 from 8 nations

Medalists
gold medal	Vietnam
silver medal	Indonesia
bronze medal	China
bronze medal	Laos

The women's quadrant event at the 2022 Asian Games was held at Jinhua Sports Center Gymnasium in Jinhua, Zhejiang from, 1 to 4 October 2023.

== Squads ==
China	India	Indonesia	Japan
Chen Shishi; Zhou Jiawen; Feng Jingyan; Tang Rongmei; Cui Yonghui; Chen Yan	Seyiekhrienuo Tepa; Maipak Devi Ayekpam; Priya Devi Elangbam; Leirentonbi Devi Elangbam; Chaoba Devi Oinam; Sezovelu Dozo	Leni; Dita Pratiwi; Fujy Lestari; Florensia Cristy; Lena; Kusnelia	Nagisa Makio; Chinatsu Sato; Yuumi Kawamata; Nanako Takahashi; Chinatsu Saegusa; Chinatsu Kobayashi
Laos	Myanmar	Philippines	Vietnam
Aksonesavanh Philavong; Lae Inthavong; Koy Xayavong; Norkham Vongxay; Nouandam Volabouth; Namfonh Morladok	Khin Hnin Wai; Phyu Phyu Than; Ya Mong Zin; Khin Pa Pa Hlaing; Hnin Hnin Wai; Hsu Mon Aung	Mary Ann Lopez; Rachelle Palomar; Jean Marie Sucalit; Abegail Sinogbuhan; Allyssa Bandoy; Mary Melody Taming	Nguyễn Thị Mỹ; Trần Thị Hồng Nhung; Trần Thị Ngọc Yến; Lê Thị Tú Trinh; Nguyễn Thị Yến; Nguyễn Thị Ngọc Huyền

== Results ==
All times are China Standard Time (UTC+08:00)

=== Preliminary ===
==== Group A ====
Pos	Team	Pld	W	L	SF	SA	SD	Pts	Qualification
1	Vietnam	3	3	0	6	1	+5	6	Semifinals
2	Indonesia	3	2	1	5	2	+3	4	Semifinals
3	Myanmar	3	1	2	2	4	−2	2	
4	Japan	3	0	3	0	6	−6	0	

Source: OCA

Date	Time		Score		Set 1	Set 2	Set 3
01 Oct	09:00	Vietnam	2–0	Myanmar	21–15	21–10	
01 Oct	14:00	Japan	0–2	Myanmar	14–21	4–21	
02 Oct	09:00	Indonesia	2–0	Japan	21–17	21–19	
02 Oct	14:00	Vietnam	2–0	Japan	21–11	21–18	
02 Oct	14:00	Myanmar	0–2	Indonesia	18–21	9–21	
03 Oct	10:00	Vietnam	2–1	Indonesia	21–19	19–21	21–19

==== Group B ====
Pos	Team	Pld	W	L	SF	SA	SD	Pts	Qualification
1	Laos	3	3	0	6	0	+6	6	Semifinals
2	China	3	2	1	4	3	+1	4	Semifinals
3	Philippines	3	1	2	3	4	−1	2	
4	India	3	0	3	0	6	−6	0	

Source: OCA

Date	Time		Score		Set 1	Set 2	Set 3
01 Oct	10:00	India	0–2	Laos	14–21	16–21	
01 Oct	15:00	Philippines	0–2	Laos	20–22	13–21	
01 Oct	15:00	China	2–0	India	21–15	21–14	
02 Oct	10:00	Philippines	1–2	China	21–11	17–21	13–21
02 Oct	15:00	Philippines	2–0	India	21–18	21–15	
03 Oct	10:00	Laos	2–0	China	21–15	21–15	

=== Knockout round ===
Semifinals
3 October
Vietnam	2
China	0
3 October
Indonesia	2
Laos	0

Gold medal match
4 October
Vietnam	2
Indonesia	1

==== Semifinals ====
Date	Time		Score		Set 1	Set 2	Set 3
03 Oct	15:30	Vietnam	2–0	China	21–10	21–6	
03 Oct	15:30	Indonesia	2–0	Laos	21–13	21–7	

==== Gold medal match ====
Date	Time		Score		Set 1	Set 2	Set 3
04 Oct	10:30	Vietnam	2–1	Indonesia	18–21	21–18	21–14
