= Sepak takraw at the 2022 Asian Games =

- Venue: Jinhua Sports Center Gymnasium
- Dates: 24 September – 7 October 2023
- Competitors: 201 from 12 nations

Sepak takraw at the 2022 Asian Games was held at Jinhua Sports Center Gymnasium, Jinhua, Zhejiang from 24 September to 7 October 2023.

== Schedule ==
P	Preliminary round	½	Semifinals	F	Final

Event↓/Date →	24th Sun	25th Mon	26th Tue	27th Wed	28th Thu	29th Fri	30th Sat	1st Sun	2nd Mon	3rd Tue		4th Wed	5th Thu	6th Fri		7th Sat
Men's regu													P	P	½	F
Men's quadrant								P	P	P	½	F				
Men's team regu	P	P	P	½		F										
Women's regu													P	P	½	F
Women's quadrant								P	P	P	½	F				
Women's team regu	P	P	P		½	F										

== Medalists ==
=== Men ===
Event	Gold	Silver	Bronze
Regu	Thailand; Siriwat Sakha; Pattarapong Yupadee; Sittipong Khamchan; Varayut Jantarasena; Pichet Pansan	Malaysia; Zarif Marican; Azlan Alias; Afifuddin Razali; Amirul Zazwan Amir; Syahir Rosdi	Philippines; Jason Huerte; Mark Joseph Gonzales; Rheyjey Ortouste; Ronsited Gabayeron; Jom Lerry Rafael
Regu	Thailand; Siriwat Sakha; Pattarapong Yupadee; Sittipong Khamchan; Varayut Jantarasena; Pichet Pansan	Malaysia; Zarif Marican; Azlan Alias; Afifuddin Razali; Amirul Zazwan Amir; Syahir Rosdi	Vietnam; Nguyễn Hoàng Lân; Ngô Thành Long; Huỳnh Ngọc Sang; Đầu Văn Hoàng; Vương Minh Châu
Quadrant	Myanmar; Thant Zin Oo; Aung Khant Thu; Zin Min Oo; Thant Zin Tun; Zin Ko Ko; Shein Wunna Zaw	Indonesia; Diky Apriyadi; Muhammad Hardiansyah Muliang; Saiful Rijal; Muhammad Hafidz; Rusdi; Abdul Halim Radjiu	Philippines; Jason Huerte; Mark Joseph Gonzales; Rheyjey Ortouste; Ronsited Gabayeron; Jom Lerry Rafael; Vince Alyson Torno
Quadrant	Myanmar; Thant Zin Oo; Aung Khant Thu; Zin Min Oo; Thant Zin Tun; Zin Ko Ko; Shein Wunna Zaw	Indonesia; Diky Apriyadi; Muhammad Hardiansyah Muliang; Saiful Rijal; Muhammad Hafidz; Rusdi; Abdul Halim Radjiu	Japan; Yuki Sato; Seiya Takano; Ryota Haruhara; Toshitaka Naito; Wataru Narawa; Yota Ichikawa
Team regu	Thailand; Siriwat Sakha; Thawisak Thongsai; Pattarapong Yupadee; Rachan Viphan; Pornthep Tinbangbon; Sittipong Khamchan; Varayut Jantarasena; Wichan Temkort; Kritsanapong Nontakote; Pichet Pansan; Tanaphon Sapyen; Marukin Phanmakon	Malaysia; Zarif Marican; Noraizat Mohd Nordin; Azlan Alias; Afifuddin Razali; Amirul Zazwan Amir; Aidil Aiman Azwawi; Hairul Hazizi Haidzir; Farhan Adam; Khairol Zaman Hamir Akhbar; Haziq Hairul Nizam; Syahir Rosdi; Zaim Razali	South Korea; Lim Tae-gyun; Lee Jun-uk; Lee Min-ju; Seo Seung-beom; Kim Jung-man; Kim Hyun-soo; Im An-soo; Seonwoo Young-su; Jeong Ha-sung; Kim Young-cheol; Lee Woo-jin; Lee Jae-seong
Team regu	Thailand; Siriwat Sakha; Thawisak Thongsai; Pattarapong Yupadee; Rachan Viphan; Pornthep Tinbangbon; Sittipong Khamchan; Varayut Jantarasena; Wichan Temkort; Kritsanapong Nontakote; Pichet Pansan; Tanaphon Sapyen; Marukin Phanmakon	Malaysia; Zarif Marican; Noraizat Mohd Nordin; Azlan Alias; Afifuddin Razali; Amirul Zazwan Amir; Aidil Aiman Azwawi; Hairul Hazizi Haidzir; Farhan Adam; Khairol Zaman Hamir Akhbar; Haziq Hairul Nizam; Syahir Rosdi; Zaim Razali	Laos; Daophachanh Moungsin; Sommanyvanh Phakonekham; Daovy Xanavongxay; Phitthasanh Bounpaseuth; Noum Souvannalith; Po Masopha; Yothin Sombatphouthone; Kantana Nanthisen; Phonesavanh Phimmachak; Adong Phoumisin; Soukkaserm Chanthahieng

=== Women ===
Event	Gold	Silver	Bronze
Regu	Thailand; Primprapha Kaewkhamsai; Ratsamee Thongsod; Somruedee Pruepruk; Wiphada Chitphuan; Sirinan Khiaopak	Vietnam; Trần Thị Hồng Nhung; Trần Thị Ngọc Yến; Lê Thị Tú Trinh; Nguyễn Thị Yến; Nguyễn Thị Ngọc Huyền	South Korea; Bae Han-oul; Park Seon-ju; Wi Ji-seon; Lee Jin-hee; Jeon Gyu-mi
Regu	Thailand; Primprapha Kaewkhamsai; Ratsamee Thongsod; Somruedee Pruepruk; Wiphada Chitphuan; Sirinan Khiaopak	Vietnam; Trần Thị Hồng Nhung; Trần Thị Ngọc Yến; Lê Thị Tú Trinh; Nguyễn Thị Yến; Nguyễn Thị Ngọc Huyền	India; Maipak Devi Ayekpam; Leirentonbi Devi Elangbam; Chaoba Devi Oinam; Khushbu; Priya Devi Elangbam
Quadrant	Vietnam; Nguyễn Thị Mỹ; Trần Thị Hồng Nhung; Trần Thị Ngọc Yến; Lê Thị Tú Trinh; Nguyễn Thị Yến; Nguyễn Thị Ngọc Huyền	Indonesia; Leni; Dita Pratiwi; Fujy Lestari; Florensia Cristy; Lena; Kusnelia	China; Chen Shishi; Zhou Jiawen; Feng Jingyan; Tang Rongmei; Cui Yonghui; Chen Yan
Quadrant	Vietnam; Nguyễn Thị Mỹ; Trần Thị Hồng Nhung; Trần Thị Ngọc Yến; Lê Thị Tú Trinh; Nguyễn Thị Yến; Nguyễn Thị Ngọc Huyền	Indonesia; Leni; Dita Pratiwi; Fujy Lestari; Florensia Cristy; Lena; Kusnelia	Laos; Aksonesavanh Philavong; Lae Inthavong; Koy Xayavong; Norkham Vongxay; Nouandam Volabouth; Namfonh Morladok
Team regu	Thailand; Masaya Duangsri; Primprapha Kaewkhamsai; Kaewjai Pumsawangkaew; Pruksa Maneewong; Ratsamee Thongsod; Manlika Bunthod; Somruedee Pruepruk; Wiphada Chitphuan; Sirinan Khiaopak; Usa Srikhamlue; Nipaporn Salupphon; Wassana Soiraya	South Korea; Kim Ji-eun; Kim Se-young; Bae Han-oul; Park Seon-ju; Choi Ji-na; Lee Min-ju; Wi Ji-seon; Park Sung-gyung; Han Ye-ji; Bae Chae-eun; Jo Seo-hyeon; Jeon Gyu-mi	Laos; Aksonesavanh Philavong; Lae Inthavong; Koy Xayavong; Norkham Vongxay; Nouandam Volabouth; Aliya Navasit; Vansone Bouavong; Sone Amphay Soulinthone; Neechapad Mapha; Namfonh Morladok
Team regu	Thailand; Masaya Duangsri; Primprapha Kaewkhamsai; Kaewjai Pumsawangkaew; Pruksa Maneewong; Ratsamee Thongsod; Manlika Bunthod; Somruedee Pruepruk; Wiphada Chitphuan; Sirinan Khiaopak; Usa Srikhamlue; Nipaporn Salupphon; Wassana Soiraya	South Korea; Kim Ji-eun; Kim Se-young; Bae Han-oul; Park Seon-ju; Choi Ji-na; Lee Min-ju; Wi Ji-seon; Park Sung-gyung; Han Ye-ji; Bae Chae-eun; Jo Seo-hyeon; Jeon Gyu-mi	Indonesia; Asmira; Leni; Dita Pratiwi; Fujy Lestari; Florensia Cristy; Lena; Wan Annisa Rachmadi; Asmaaul Husna; Kusnelia; Dona Aulia; Fitra Siu; Frisca Kharisma Indrasari

== Medal table ==
Rank	Nation	Gold	Silver	Bronze	Total
1	Thailand (THA)	4	0	0	4
2	Vietnam (VIE)	1	1	1	3
3	Myanmar (MYA)	1	0	0	1
4	Indonesia (INA)	0	2	1	3
5	Malaysia (MAS)	0	2	0	2
6	South Korea (KOR)	0	1	2	3
7	Laos (LAO)	0	0	3	3
8	Philippines (PHI)	0	0	2	2
9	China (CHN)	0	0	1	1
9	India (IND)	0	0	1	1
9	Japan (JPN)	0	0	1	1
Totals (11 entries)		6	6	12	24

== Participating nations ==
A total of 201 athletes from 12 nations competed in sepak takraw at the 2022 Asian Games:

- China (10)
- India (16)
- Indonesia (24)
- Japan (24)
- Laos (21)
- Malaysia (12)
- Myanmar (14)
- Philippines (12)
- Singapore (6)
- South Korea (26)
- Thailand (24)
- Vietnam (12)
