= Esports at the 2022 Asian Games – PUBG Mobile =

Esports event at 2022 Asian Games

PUBG Mobile at the 2022 Asian Games
- Venue: Hangzhou Esports Center
- Date: 27 September – 1 October 2023
- Competitors: 99 from 21 nations

Medalists
gold medal	China; Liu Yunyu, Zhu Bocheng, Zhang Jianhui, Chen Yumeng, Huang Can
silver medal	South Korea; Choi Young-jae, Kim Dong-hyeon, Kwon Soon-bin, Kim Sung-hyun, Park Sang-cheol
bronze medal	Chinese Taipei; Chiang Chien-ting, Wang Bo-zhi, Tsai Cheng-fu, Wang Chin-hung, Chen Hung-ming

The PUBG Mobile (locally known in China as Peacekeeper Elite) event at the 2022 Asian Games took place from 29 September to 1 October 2023 in Hangzhou, China. The game is also known as Game for Peace.

The game used for the tournament is a modified edition of the mobile game PUBG Mobile made specifically for the Asian Games. The battle royale feature of the game was removed, which meant players would not be able to shoot against each other. This is to comply with the International Olympic Committee's preference for titles compliant with the "Olympic values". The tournament featured the game's Off-Road Racing Mode, where a teams of four would race against each other. They had to pass checkpoints where they can shoot targets for additional points.

== Schedule ==
All times are China Standard Time (UTC+08:00)

Date	Time	Event
Wednesday, 27 September 2023	14:00	Qualification
Thursday, 28 September 2023	09:00	Preliminary round 1
Thursday, 28 September 2023	19:00	Preliminary round 2
Friday, 29 September 2023	09:00	1/8 eliminations
Saturday, 30 September 2023	09:00	Semifinals
Sunday, 1 October 2023	19:00	Final

== Seeding ==
A qualification tournament called AESF Road to Asian Games 2022 was played in Macau, China from 22 to 26 June 2023. The results of this tournament were used to determine the seedings for the Games.

East Asia	Southeast Asia	West Asia	Central & South Asia
China	Thailand	Palestine	Kazakhstan
Chinese Taipei	Laos	Jordan	Sri Lanka
Hong Kong	Indonesia	Saudi Arabia	Nepal
South Korea	Philippines	Bahrain	Kyrgyzstan
Macau	Myanmar	Oman	Uzbekistan
	Malaysia		
	Brunei		
	Singapore		
	Vietnam		

China, Thailand, Palestine and Kazakhstan qualified directly to the 1/8 eliminations. All other RDAG participating teams advanced to the preliminary round 1.

== Squads ==
China	Chinese Taipei	Hong Kong	Indonesia
Liu Yunyu; Zhu Bocheng; Zhang Jianhui; Chen Yumeng; Huang Can	Chiang Chien-ting; Wang Bo-zhi; Tsai Cheng-fu; Wang Chin-hung; Chen Hung-ming	Tsang Wai Ki; Hung Man Ka; Tsung Wai Ting; Jeffrey Chan	Alan Raynold Kumaseh; Vebryano Akbar Maulana; Juventino Ryan Jeremy Rolos; Teuku Muhammad Kausar; Fajar Octa Ramadhan
Japan	Jordan	Kazakhstan	Laos
Masahiro Ishida; Yu Watanabe; Hiro Kimura; Koki Sekikawa	Mohammad Al-Addasi; Laith Mehidat; Ali Al-Essawi; Ghaith Al-Aiyadi; Omar Seif	Nurlybek Aslanbekuly; Batyr Tuleush; Syrym Tuleush; Zhangir Myrza	Khantavanh Chansavath; Soukphachan Phommalangsy; Alounyadeth Nilandone; Vanthanongsin Kingsada
Macau	Maldives	Mongolia	Myanmar
Lam Pou Fat; Kuok Chon Kei; Zhao Jie Hao; Wong Sao Teng; Lam Pui Kei	Adil Hussain; Haisham Waheedh; Ahmed Maishaan Bushree; Maadhu Hussain Ibrahim; Sham Ali Wafir	Bayartsengeliin Zolboot; Khatanbaataryn Khüselbaatar; Batkhuyagiin Batbagana; Baatarkhüügiin Bilgüün; Nyamlkhagva Dulaanjargal	Myo San Aung; Aung San Thit; Thar Pyae Kyaw; Li Yaw Ha; Htet Naing Aung
Nepal	Palestine	Philippines	Saudi Arabia
Subin Kumar Prajapati; Shahas Bhandari; Samir Gurung; Dipesh Gurung; Sangin Bhattarai	Mohammed Abdalaziz; Wasim Hamed; Ayoub Ishtayyeh; Anas Jaber; Hamza Jaber	Francis Fusingan; Jon Michael Cabig; Florenz Taleon; Alen Origenes; Abdul Barode	Khalid Al-Abdulaziz; Abdulrahman Al-Arawi; Abdulrahman Al-Fahhad; Ahmed Al-Qahtani; Bandar Al-Qahtani
South Korea	Sri Lanka	Thailand	Uzbekistan
Choi Young-jae; Kim Dong-hyeon; Kwon Soon-bin; Kim Sung-hyun; Park Sang-cheol	Chamuditha Watshan; Riham Ramji; Rizny Azmy; Ramesh Kavindu	Supachai Singkaew; Purin Rongkhankaew; Nuttawut Muensa; Natchaphon Somtus; Sikarin Nopparat	Diyorjon Abdumalikov; Shakhruz Nazarov; Rikardo Sharafidinov; Jamoliddin Turgunov
Vietnam			
Nguyễn Đình Chiến; Phan Văn Đông; Vũ Hoàng Hưng; Lê Văn Quang; Nguyễn Quốc Cường			

== Results ==
=== Qualification ===
- Qualification: 1–2 → Preliminary round 1 (PR1), Rest → Preliminary round 2 (PR2)

Rank	Team	Game 1	Game 2	Game 3	Game 4	Total	Notes
1	Japan	12:38.89	11:20.25	12:56.69	11:40.34	48:36.17	PR1
2	Mongolia	14:51.59	14:36.59	16:34.09	15:07.72	1:01:09.99	PR1
3	Maldives	15:48.21	15:16.85	16:08.64	14:57.86	1:02:11.56	PR2

=== Preliminary round 1 ===
- Qualification: 1 + Next best time → 1/8 eliminations (EF), Rest → Preliminary round 2 (PR2)

==== Group A ====
Rank	Team	Game 1	Game 2	Game 3	Game 4	Total	Notes
1	Hong Kong	12:39.869	11:43.865	13:03.478	11:25.246	48:52.458	EF
2	Uzbekistan	15:38.160	14:26.637	15:51.285	14:55.316	1:00:51.398	PR2
3	Laos	15:26.500	15:10.555	16:44.854	15:09.365	1:02:31.274	PR2
4	Jordan	23:25.999	14:23.443	15:38.336	14:53.830	1:08:21.608	PR2

==== Group B ====
Rank	Team	Game 1	Game 2	Game 3	Game 4	Total	Notes
1	Chinese Taipei	12:12.584	11:38.475	12:44.451	11:45.538	48:21.048	EF
2	Sri Lanka	15:10.473	13:37.616	14:46.919	13:58.245	57:33.253	PR2
3	Philippines	16:25.369	14:56.469	15:22.718	16:04.088	1:02:48.644	PR2
4	Macau	16:23.516	14:33.154	17:20.431	16:33.041	1:04:50.142	PR2

==== Group C ====
Rank	Team	Game 1	Game 2	Game 3	Game 4	Total	Notes
1	South Korea	12:23.555	10:48.266	12:54.092	11:22.554	47:28.467	EF
2	Nepal	13:25.545	11:55.979	14:17.321	12:41.183	52:20.028	EF
3	Vietnam	13:55.124	13:00.762	14:32.161	13:35.539	55:03.586	PR2
4	Mongolia	15:45.598	14:17.130	16:14.549	16:57.018	1:03:14.295	PR2

==== Group D ====
Rank	Team	Game 1	Game 2	Game 3	Game 4	Total	Notes
1	Indonesia	13:56.777	12:04.844	13:51.694	12:24.266	52:17.581	EF
2	Japan	13:36.563	12:43.818	13:47.971	12:51.629	52:59.981	PR2
3	Myanmar	15:42.726	14:02.474	16:02.529	15:05.163	1:00:52.892	PR2
4	Saudi Arabia	15:52.473	15:30.745	16:27.622	16:18.653	1:04:09.493	PR2

=== Preliminary round 2 ===
- Qualification: 1–2 + Next best time → 1/8 eliminations (EF)

==== Group A ====
Rank	Team	Game 1	Game 2	Game 3	Game 4	Total	Notes
1	Japan	12:48.772	12:01.379	13:22.950	12:01.298	50:14.399	EF
2	Philippines	14:57.046	14:44.948	16:12.971	14:17.743	1:00:12.768	EF
3	Laos	15:27.122	14:10.647	16:48.924	14:29.532	1:00:56.225	EF
4	Maldives	17:18.475	15:00.821	17:55.280	15:36.449	1:05:51.025	

==== Group B ====
Rank	Team	Game 1	Game 2	Game 3	Game 4	Total	Notes
1	Vietnam	13:56.798	13:01.904	13:53.037	13:42.594	54:34.333	EF
2	Myanmar	15:10.752	14:18.102	15:28.252	14:26.428	59:23.534	EF
3	Jordan	15:32.235	14:09.276	16:37.170	15:24.095	1:01:42.776	
4	Mongolia	16:08.883	16:15.367	17:02.078	16:41.227	1:06:07.555	

==== Group C ====
Rank	Team	Game 1	Game 2	Game 3	Game 4	Total	Notes
1	Saudi Arabia	15:47.862	14:52.856	16:26.532	15:48.462	1:02.55.712	EF
2	Sri Lanka	15:51.643	16:18.851	16:35.293	15:06.648	1:03:52.435	EF
3	Macau	16:12.207	15:43.166	17:12.139	15:53.778	1:05:01.290	
4	Uzbekistan	16:58.655	15:13.268	17:03.980	16:02.880	1:05:18.783	

=== 1/8 eliminations ===
- Qualification: 1–2 → Semifinals (SF)

==== Group A ====
Rank	Team	Game 1	Game 2	Game 3	Game 4	Total	Notes
1	South Korea	11:49.437	11:17.355	12:41.230	11:12.255	47:00.277	SF
2	Thailand	14:11.725	12:16.366	14:20.110	12:42.085	53:30.286	SF
3	Myanmar	14:45.920	13:15.059	15:38.997	14:42.368	58:22.344	
4	Philippines	14:59.359	14:21.912	16:07.960	16:04.176	1:01:33.137	

==== Group B ====
Rank	Team	Game 1	Game 2	Game 3	Game 4	Total	Notes
1	China	12:25.340	11:39.688	13:15.353	11:51.402	49:11.783	SF
2	Chinese Taipei	12:40.545	11:56.800	13:18.756	12:14.736	50:10.837	SF
3	Vietnam	13:47.779	12:59.992	14:34.476	13:38.097	55:00.344	
4	Laos	14:31.284	13:48.733	15:36.317	16:23.620	1:00:19.954	

==== Group C ====
Rank	Team	Game 1	Game 2	Game 3	Game 4	Total	Notes
1	Hong Kong	13:06.674	12:11.834	13:12.187	12:39.288	51:09.983	SF
2	Nepal	13:46.842	12:57.968	13:59.575	13:20.457	54:04.842	SF
3	Palestine	14:50.177	14:03.675	16:40.886	15:14.789	1:00:49.527	
4	Saudi Arabia	16:41.758	14:56.734	17:16.735	14:50.475	1:03:45.702	

==== Group D ====
Rank	Team	Game 1	Game 2	Game 3	Game 4	Total	Notes
1	Japan	13:35.361	12:37.891	13:39.003	12:55.442	52:47.697	SF
2	Indonesia	13:17.950	12:46.191	14:41.213	13:34.506	54:19.860	SF
3	Sri Lanka	16:27.673	14:16.290	15:42.221	14:15.583	1:00.41.767	
4	Kazakhstan	16:04.475	14:04.816	16:22.991	16:48.548	1:03:20.830	

=== Semifinals ===
- Qualification: 1–2 → Final (F)

==== Group A ====
Rank	Team	Game 1	Game 2	Game 3	Game 4	Total	Notes
1	South Korea	12:45.360	11:46.967	13:37.176	12:27.648	50:37.151	F
2	Chinese Taipei	13:04.692	12:22.081	14:13.235	12:39.385	52:19.393	F
3	Nepal	13:39.320	13:04.658	14:21.773	13:27.685	54:33.346	
4	Japan	13:54.544	12:28.316	14:48.761	13:30.910	54:42.531	

==== Group B ====
Rank	Team	Game 1	Game 2	Game 3	Game 4	Total	Notes
1	China	12:16.986	12:02.109	13:32.141	12:25.524	50:16.760	F
2	Indonesia	12:46.889	12:48.228	13:41.212	13:05.015	52:21.344	F
3	Thailand	13:33.368	12:50.249	14:44.444	14:28.675	55:36.736	
4	Hong Kong	24:17.849	12:37.465	14:32.655	13:20.023	1:04:47.992	

=== Final ===
Rank	Team	Game 1	Game 2	Game 3	Game 4	Total
1st place, gold medalist(s)	China	11:09.819	10:35.492	11:50.656	11:00.976	44:36.943
2nd place, silver medalist(s)	South Korea	12:32.087	12:18.593	13:44.405	11:49.954	50:25.039
3rd place, bronze medalist(s)	Chinese Taipei	12:51.929	12:15.170	13:37.000	12:20.046	51:04.145
4	Indonesia	13:20.198	12:35.005	14:14.755	13:12.495	53:22.453
