= Indonesia at the 2022 Asian Games =

- IOC code: INA
- NOC: Indonesian Olympic Committee
- Website: www.nocindonesia.or.id (in English)

in Hangzhou September 23 – October 8
- Competitors: 413 in 30 sports
- Flag bearers (opening): Hernanda Zulfi; Nandhira Mauriskha
- Flag bearer (closing): Ahmad Zigi Zaresta Yuda
- Medals Ranked 13th: Gold 7 Silver 11 Bronze 18 Total 36

Asian Games appearances (overview)
- 1951; 1954; 1958; 1962; 1966; 1970; 1974; 1978; 1982; 1986; 1990; 1994; 1998; 2002; 2006; 2010; 2014; 2018; 2022; 2026

Indonesia competed at the 2022 Asian Games in Hangzhou. Originally scheduled to take place in 2022, the Games were postponed and rescheduled to 2023, due to the COVID-19 pandemic. Indonesia competed with 413 athletes.

== Background ==
=== Administration ===
National Olympic Committee of Indonesia assigned the minister of public works and public housing, Basuki Hadimuljono, as chef de mission for the Indonesian contingent.

=== Flag bearers ===
Hernanda Zulfi (Volleyball) and Nandhira Mauriskha (Wushu) were the Indonesian flag bearers at 2022 Asian Games opening ceremony. Zulfi wore complete traditional clothing from Rote Island, an island at the southernmost tip of Indonesia which is part of the East Nusa Tenggara region. Meanwhile, Mauriskha wore traditional Betawi kebaya.

=== Broadcasters ===
Name	Type	Ref
MNC Group	Free-to-air	

== Competitors ==
The following is the list of number of competitors in the Games.

Sport	Men	Women	Total
Archery	8	8	16
Athletics	11	5	16
Badminton	10	10	20
Basketball	12	12	24
Beach volleyball	4	4	8
Boxing	3	2	5
Bridge	3	9	12
Canoeing	5	2	7
Chess	2	5	7
Cricket	0	15	15
Cycling	10	7	17
Diving	0	1	1
Dragon boat	14	14	28
Equestrian	1	0	1
Esports	13	0	13
Fencing	1	0	1
Football	22	0	22
Field hockey	18	18	36
Judo	2	2	4
Ju-jitsu	0	1	1
Karate	4	4	8
Kurash	0	1	1
Marathon swimming	1	0	1
Modern pentathlon	1	1	2
Rowing	15	4	19
Sepak takraw	12	12	24
Shooting	12	11	23
Skateboarding	2	1	3
Soft tennis	5	2	7
Sport climbing	6	6	12
Swimming	6	2	8
Taekwondo	1	2	3
Tennis	5	5	10
Triathlon	1	0	1
Volleyball	12	0	12
Weightlifting	3	6	9
Wrestling	4	2	6
Wushu	8	4	12
Total	237	178	415

== Medal summary ==
=== Medals by sport ===
Medals by sport
Sport	1st place, gold medalist(s)	2nd place, silver medalist(s)	3rd place, bronze medalist(s)	Total
Shooting	2	0	3	5
Dragon boat	1	4	1	6
Wushu	1	2	2	5
Sport climbing	1	2	2	5
Cycling	1	0	1	2
Weightlifting	1	0	0	1
Sepak takraw	0	2	1	3
Roller sports	0	1	0	1
Rowing	0	0	3	3
Archery	0	0	2	2
Karate	0	0	1	1
Soft tennis	0	0	1	1
Tennis	0	0	1	1
Total	7	11	18	36

=== Medals by day ===
Medals by date
Day	Date	1st place, gold medalist(s)	2nd place, silver medalist(s)	3rd place, bronze medalist(s)	Total
1	24 September	0	1	3	4
2	25 September	1	0	1	2
3	26 September	2	0	1	3
4	27 September	0	2	2	4
5	28 September	0	0	3	3
6	29 September	0	0	0	0
7	30 September	0	0	0	0
8	1 October	1	0	1	2
9	2 October	0	0	0	0
10	3 October	2	0	2	4
11	4 October	0	5	3	8
12	5 October	0	2	1	3
13	6 October	1	1	1	3
14	7 October	0	0	0	0
Total		7	11	18	36

=== Medals by gender ===
Medals by gender
Gender	1st place, gold medalist(s)	2nd place, silver medalist(s)	3rd place, bronze medalist(s)	Total	Percentage
Male	5	6	10	21	58.3%
Female	2	5	7	14	38.9%
Mixed	0	0	1	1	2.78%
Total	7	11	18	36	100%

== Medalists ==
The following Indonesian competitors won medals at the Games.

No.	Medal	Name	Sport	Event	Date
1	Gold	Muhammad Sejahtera Dwi Putra	Shooting	Men's 10 m running target	25 September
2	Gold	Muhammad Sejahtera Dwi Putra	Shooting	Men's 10 m running target mixed	26 September
3	Gold	Harris Horatius	Wushu	Men's nanquan	26 September
4	Gold	Amellya Nur Sifa	Cycling	Women's BMX race	1 October
5	Gold	Rahmat Erwin Abdullah	Weightlifting	Men's 73 kg	3 October
6	Gold	Desak Made Rita Kusuma Dewi	Sport climbing	Women's speed	3 October
7	Gold	Dedi Saputra; Andri Agus Mulyana; Harjuna; Tri Wahyu Buwono; Yuda Firmansyah; Indra Tri Setiawan; Joko Andriyanto; Maizir Riyondra; Mugi Harjito; Muh Burhan; Sutrisno; Sofiyanto; Angga Suwandi Putra; Zubakri	Dragon boat	Men's 1000 m	6 October
1	Silver	Edgar Xavier Marvelo	Wushu	Men's changquan	24 September
2	Silver	Sanggoe Darma Tanjung	Roller sports	Men's street skateboarding	27 September
3	Silver	Samuel Marbun	Wushu	Men's sanda 65 kg	27 September
4	Silver	Muhammad Hafidz; Rusdi; Diky Apriadi; Muh. Hardiansyah Muliang; Rijal Saiful; Abdul Halim Radjiu	Sepak takraw	Men's quadrant	4 October
5	Silver	Dita Pratiwi; Fujy Lestari; Leni Lena; Kusnelia; Florensia Cristy	Sepak takraw	Women's quadrant	4 October
6	Silver	Ayuning Tika Vihari; Anisa Yulistiawan; Fazriah Nurbayan; Cinta Priendtisca Nayomi; Dayumin Dayumin; Raudani Fitra; Iin Rosiana Damiri; Maryati Maryati; Sella Monim; Nadia Hafiza; Ramla Baharuddin; Ratih Ratih; Reski Wahyuni; Ester Yustince Daimoi	Dragon boat	Women's 200 m	4 October
7	Silver	Kiromal Katibin; Veddriq Leonardo; Rahmad Adi Mulyono; Aspar	Sport climbing	Men's speed relay	4 October
8	Silver	Desak Made Rita Kusuma Dewi; Nurul Iqamah; Rajiah Sallsabillah; Alivany Ver Khadijah	Sport climbing	Women's speed relay	4 October
9	Silver	Dedi Saputra; Andri Agus Mulyana; Harjuna; Tri Wahyu Buwono; Yuda Firmansyah; Indra Tri Setiawan; Joko Andriyanto; Maizir Riyondra; Mugi Harjito; Muh Burhan; Sutrisno; Sofiyanto; Angga Suwandi Putra; Zubakri	Dragon boat	Men's 500 m	5 October
10	Silver	Ayuning Tika Vihari; Anisa Yulistiawan; Fazriah Nurbayan; Cinta Priendtisca Nayomi; Dayumin Dayumin; Raudani Fitra; Iin Rosiana Damiri; Maryati Maryati; Sella Monim; Nadia Hafiza; Ramla Baharuddin; Ratih Ratih; Reski Wahyuni; Ester Yustince Daimoi	Dragon boat	Women's 500 m	5 October
11	Silver	Ayuning Tika Vihari; Anisa Yulistiawan; Fazriah Nurbayan; Cinta Priendtisca Nayomi; Dayumin Dayumin; Raudani Fitra; Iin Rosiana Damiri; Maryati Maryati; Sella Monim; Nadia Hafiza; Ramla Baharuddin; Ratih Ratih; Reski Wahyuni; Ester Yustince Daimoi	Dragon boat	Women's 1000 m	6 October
1	Bronze	Chelsea Corputty; Mutiara Rahma Putri	Rowing	Women's lightweight double sculls	24 September
2	Bronze	Ihram; Memo	Rowing	Men's double sculls	24 September
3	Bronze	Rifqi Harits Taufiqurahman; Kakan Kusmana; Sulpianto; Rendi Setia Maulana; Asuhan Pattiha; Ferdiansyah Hafid; Denri Maulidzar Al-Ghiffari; Ardi Isadi; Ujang Hasbulloh	Rowing	Men's coxed eight	24 September
4	Bronze	Muhammad Badri Akbar; Muhammad Sejahtera Dwi Putra; Irfandi Julio	Shooting	Men's 10 m running target team	25 September
5	Bronze	Muhammad Badri Akbar; Muhammad Sejahtera Dwi Putra; Irfandi Julio	Shooting	Men's 10 m running target mixed run team	26 September
6	Bronze	Seraf Naro Siregar	Wushu	Men's daoshu and gunshu	27 September
7	Bronze	Tharisa Dea Florentina	Wushu	Women's sanda 52 kg	27 September
8	Bronze	Feny Bachtiar; Nourma Try Indriani; Rica Nensi Perangin Angin	Shooting	Women's 10 m running target team	28 September
9	Bronze	Aldila Sutjiadi; Janice Tjen	Tennis	Women's doubles	28 September
10	Bronze	Leni; Asmira; Frisca Kharisma Indrasari; Wan Annisa Rachmadi Lena; Florensia Cristy; Fitra Siu; Dita Pratiwi; Dona Aulia Asmaul Husna; Fujy Lestari; Kusnelia	Sepak takraw	Women's team regu	28 September
11	Bronze	Jasmine Azzahra Setyobudi	Cycling	Women's BMX race	1 October
12	Bronze	Rajiah Sallsabillah	Sport climbing	Women's speed	3 October
13	Bronze	Veddriq Leonardo	Sport climbing	Men's speed	3 October
14	Bronze	Mario Harley Alibasa; Hemat Bhakti Anugerah; Tio Juliandi Hutauruk; Fernando Sanger; Sunu Wahyu Trijati	Soft tennis	Men's team	4 October
15	Bronze	Dedi Saputra; Andri Agus Mulyana; Harjuna; Tri Wahyu Buwono; Yuda Firmansyah; Indra Tri Setiawan; Joko Andriyanto; Maizir Riyondra; Mugi Harjito; Muh Burhan; Sutrisno; Sofiyanto; Angga Suwandi Putra; Zubakri	Dragon boat	Men's 200 m	4 October
16	Bronze	Riau Ega Agata Salsabilla; Diananda Choirunisa	Archery	Mixed team	4 October
17	Bronze	Ignatius Joshua Kandou	Karate	Men's Kumite-75 kg	5 October
18	Bronze	Riau Ega Agata Salsabilla; Arif Dwi Pangestu; Ahmad Khoirul Baasith	Archery	Men's team recurve	6 October

== Archery ==
=== Recurve ===
Athlete	Event	Ranking round			Round of 64	Round of 32	Round of 16	Quarterfinals	Semifinals	Final / BM	
Athlete	Event	Score	Rank	Seed	Opposition score	Opposition score	Opposition score	Opposition score	Opposition score	Opposition score	Rank
Ahmad Khoirul Baasith	Men's individual	660	23	17 Q	Ganiev (TJK); W 6–0	Islam (BAN); W 6–0	Lee (KOR); L 1–7	Did not advance to next round			
Alviyanto Bagas Prastyadi	Men's individual	646	36	DNQ	Did not advance to next round						
Arif Dwi Pangestu	Men's individual	660	25	DNQ	Did not advance to next round						
Riau Ega Agatha	Men's individual	673	9	7 Q	—N/a	Reaport (PHI); W 6–4	Wei (CHN); W 6–4	Baatarkhuyagiin (MGL); L 0–6	Did not advance to next round		
Ahmad Khoirul Baasith; Arif Dwi Pangestu; Riau Ega Agatha	Men's team	1993	5 Q		—N/a		Malaysia; W 5–3	Iran; W 6–2	South Korea; L 0–6	Bangladesh; W 6–0	3rd place, bronze medalist(s)
Anindya Nayla Putri	Women's individual	581	62(-)		Did not advance						
Catharine Thea Darma	Women's individual	482	79(-)		Did not advance						
Diananda Choirunisa	Women's individual	656	10(6)		Bye	Pourmahani (IRI) 39(27); W 6–5	Do (VIE) 15(11); W 6–2	An (KOR) 3(3); L 3-7	Did not advance		
Rezza Octavia	Women's individual	621	34(23)		Bidaure (PHI) 39(27); W 6–0	Bhakat (IND) 14(10); W 6–5	Sugimoto (JPN) 11(7); L 3-7	Did not advance			
Anindya Nayla Putri; Diananda Choirunisa; Rezza Octavia	Women's team	1858	9		—N/a		Malaysia (8); W 6-2	South Korea (1); L 0-6	Did not advance		
Riau Ega Agatha; Diananda Choirunisa	Mixed team	1329	4		—N/a		Mongolia (13); W 5-1	India (5); W 5-4 (SO 20–19)	South Korea (1); L 2-6	Iran (4); W 6-2	3rd place, bronze medalist(s)

=== Compound ===
Athlete	Event	Ranking round		Round of 64	Round of 32	Round of 16	Quarterfinals	Semifinals	Final / BM	
Athlete	Event	Score	Seed	Opposition score	Opposition score	Opposition score	Opposition score	Opposition score	Opposition score	Rank
Deki Adika Hastian	Men's individual	694	21(17)	Bye	Lee (HKG) 20(16); W 144–141	Joo (KOR) 1(1); L 147–149	Did not advance			
Dhany Diva Pradana	Men's individual	696	18(15)	Bye	Duong (VIE) 23(18); W 144(10)–144(9)	Chang (TPE) 2(2); L 145–146	Did not advance			
M Ryan Hidayat	Men's individual	685	39(-)	Did not advance						
Hendika Pratama Putra	Men's individual	692	26(-)	Did not advance						
Deki Adika Hastian; Dhany Diva Pradana; Hendika Pratama Putra	Men's team	2082	7	—N/a		Bhutan (10); L 228-232	Did not advance			
Firstalitha Kyla Widaputri	Women's individual	668	36	Did not advance						
Ratih Zilizati Fadhly	Women's individual	690	7(6)	Bye	Ong (SGP) 42(27); W 147–137	Nguyen (VIE) 17(11); W 143–142	Oh (KOR) 3(3); W 148(10)–148(9)	So (KOR) 2(2); L 142–145	Swami (IND) 4(4); L 140–146	4
Syahara Khoerunisa	Women's individual	683	19(13)	Bye	Zaman (BAN) 29(20); W 145–143	Swami (IND) 4(4); L 146–148	Did not advance			
Sri Ranti	Women's individual	676	23(-)	Did not advance						
Ratih Zilizati Fadhly; Syahara Khoerunisa; Sri Ranti	Women's team	2049	4	—N/a		Bye	Kazakhstan (5); W 232-229	India (1); L 219-233	South Korea (2); L 229-232	4
Ratih Zilizati Fadhly; Dhany Diva Pradana	Mixed team	1386	6	—N/a		Philippines (11); W 156–153	Chinese Taipei (3); L 154–156	Did not advance		

== Athletics ==
The Indonesian contingent sent 16 names of athletes consisting of 11 male athletes and 5 female athletes each. Training camp in Tianjin was one of the training programs for preparing Indonesian athletes for the competition.

Key
- Note–Ranks given for track events are within the athlete's heat only
- Q = Qualified for the next round
- q = Qualified for the next round as a fastest loser or, in field events, by position without achieving the qualifying target
- SB = Season Best
- PB = Personal Best
- NR = National record
- N/A = Round not applicable for the event
- Bye = Athlete not required to compete in round

=== Men's ===
Athlete(s)	Event	Heat		Semifinal		Final	
Athlete(s)	Event	Result	Rank	Result	Rank	Result	Rank
Lalu Muhammad Zohri	100 m	10.22 ~~SB~~	1 Q	10.12 SB	1 Q	10.16	6
Robi Syianturi	5000 m	—N/a				14:24.04 PB	12
Robi Syianturi	10000 m	—N/a				29:55.31 PB	8
Rikki Simbolon	10000 m	—N/a				30:56.66 PB	9
Pandu Sukarya	3000 m Steeplechase	—N/a				8:54:34	9
Lalu Muhammad Zohri; Sudirman Hadi; Bayu Kertanegara; Adith Rico Pradana	4x100 m Relay	39.56	2Q	—N/a		39.25	5
Agus Prayogo	Marathon	—N/a				2:20:53 PB	13
Hendro	20 km Race Walk	—N/a				1:36:17	9
Abdul Hafiz	Javelin Throw	—N/a				70.89 SB	9

=== Women's ===
Athlete(s)	Event	Heat		Semifinal		Final	
Athlete(s)	Event	Result	Rank	Result	Rank	Result	Rank
Dina Aulia	100 m Hurdles	13.92	5	Did not advance			12
Odekta Elvina Naibaho	Marathon	—N/a				2:37:51 PB	9
Violine Intan Puspita	20 km Race Walk	—N/a				1:53:14 PB	8
Maria Natalia Londa	Long Jump	—N/a				5.98	10
Eki Febri Ekawati	Shot Put	—N/a				15,10 m	10

== Badminton ==
The Indonesian contingent sent 20 names of athletes consisting of 10 male athletes and 10 female athletes each. For the first time in Asian Games history, Indonesia failed to win a single medal in badminton.

=== Men ===
Athlete	Event	Round of 64	Round of 32	Round of 16	Quarter-finals	Semi-finals	Final	
Athlete	Event	Opposition Score	Opposition Score	Opposition Score	Opposition Score	Opposition Score	Opposition Score	Rank
Anthony Sinisuka Ginting	Singles	Bye	Wang (TPE); W (21–16, 21–11)	Teh (SGP); W (21–14, 21–18)	Li (CHN); L (13–21, 17–21)	Did not advance		
Jonatan Christie	Singles	Bye	Chou (TPE); L (17–21, 17–21)	Did not advance				
Fajar Alfian; Muhammad Rian Ardianto	Doubles	—N/a	Bye	Sukphun / Teeraratsakul (THA); W (21–16, 21–15)	Lee / Wang (TPE); L (19–21, 18–21)	Did not advance		
Leo Rolly Carnando; Daniel Marthin	Doubles	—N/a	Leong I C / Vong K W (MAC); W (21–9, 21–8)	Rankireddy / C Shetty (IND); L (22-24, 21-16, 12-21)	Did not advance			
Anthony Sinisuka Ginting; Jonatan Christie; Chico Aura Dwi Wardoyo; Shesar Hiren Rhustavito; Fajar Alfian; Muhammad Rian Ardianto; Leo Rolly Carnando; Daniel Marthin; Rehan Naufal Kusharjanto; Rinov Rivaldy	Team	—N/a	—N/a	Bye	South Korea (KOR); L 1–3	Did not advance		

=== Women ===
Athlete	Event	Round of 64	Round of 32	Round of 16	Quarter-finals	Semi-finals	Final	
Athlete	Event	Opposition Score	Opposition Score	Opposition Score	Opposition Score	Opposition Score	Opposition Score	Rank
Gregoria Mariska Tunjung	Singles	Bye	Chaliha (IND); W (21–17, 21–16)	Goh (MAS); W (6–21, 12–21)	Ohori (JPN); L (10–21, 19–21)	Did not advance		
Putri Kusuma Wardani	Singles	Bye	Liang (HKG); W (21–11, 21–10)	Sindhu (IND); L (21–16, 21–16)	Did not advance			
Apriyani Rahayu; Siti Fadia Silva Ramadhanti	Doubles	—N/a	Lui L L / Ng W Y (HKG); W (21–14, 21–14)	Y Fukushima / S Hirota (JPN); L (3^{r}–15)	Did not advance			
Febriana Dwipuji Kusuma; Amalia Cahaya Pratiwi	Doubles	—N/a	R Maharjan / A Maya Rai (NEP); W (21–3, 21–7)	Chen / Jia (CHN); L (5–21, 17–21)	Did not advance			
Gregoria Mariska Tunjung; Putri Kusuma Wardani; Komang Ayu Cahya Dewi; Ester Nurumi Tri Wardoyo; Apriyani Rahayu; Siti Fadia Silva Ramadhanti; Febriana Dwipuji Kusuma; Amalia Cahaya Pratiwi; Lisa Ayu Kusumawati; Pitha Haningtyas Mentari	Team	—N/a	—N/a	Bye	China (CHN); L 0–3	Did not advance		

=== Mixed ===
Athlete	Event	Round of 64	Round of 32	Round of 16	Quarter-finals	Semi-finals	Final	
Athlete	Event	Opposition Score	Opposition Score	Opposition Score	Opposition Score	Opposition Score	Opposition Score	Rank
Rehan Naufal Kusharjanto; Lisa Ayu Kusumawati	Doubles	—N/a	Ye / Lee (TPE); L (13–21, 20–22)	Did not advance				
Rinov Rivaldy; Pitha Haningtyas Mentari	Doubles	—N/a	Kim / Jeong (KOR); W (21–15, 16–21, 21–19)	Watanabe/ Higashino (JPN); L (17–21, 15–21)	Did not advance			

== Basketball ==
Summary

Team	Event	Group Stage				Qualification for quarterfinals	Quarterfinal	Semifinals / Pl.	Final / BM / Pl.	
Team	Event	Opposition score	Opposition score	Opposition score	Rank		Opposition score	Opposition score	Opposition score	Rank
Indonesia men's	Men's tournament	South Korea; L 55–95	Japan; L 57–70	Qatar; L 67–74	4	Did not advance				15
Indonesia women's	Women's tournament	India; L 46–66	China; L 52–101	Mongolia; W 69–64	3 Q	Bye	Japan; L 47–89	Did not advance		8

=== 5x5 basketball ===
Indonesia men's and women's basketball team entered the competition, drawn in group D for the men's and in group A for the women's.

== Boxing ==
Men

Athlete	Event	Round of 32	Round of 16	Quarterfinals	Semifinals	Final	Rank
Athlete	Event	Opposition Result	Opposition Result	Opposition Result	Opposition Result	Opposition Result	Rank
Dio Koebanu	–51 kg	Rabin Thapa (NEP); L 1–4	Did not advance				
Asri Udin	–57 kg	Sachin (IND); L 0–5	Did not advance				
Maikhel Roberrd Muskita	–80 kg	Bye	Hussein Iashaish (JOR); RSC	Did not advance			

Women

Athlete	Event	Round of 32	Round of 16	Quarterfinals	Semifinals	Final	Rank
Athlete	Event	Opposition Result	Opposition Result	Opposition Result	Opposition Result	Opposition Result	Rank
Novita Sinadia	–50 kg	Bye	Ruhafzo Haqnazarova (TJK); L 1–4	Did not advance			
Huswatun Hasanah	–60 kg	Bye	Noura Almutairi (KUW); W 5–0	Thananya Somnuek (THA); RSC	Did not advance		

RSC= Referee Stops Contest

== Bridge ==
Athlete	Event	Qualification		Semi-finals	Final	Rank
Athlete	Event	Points	Rank	Opposition Result	Opposition Result	Rank
Fera Damayanti; Yunita Fytry; Elsya Saktia Ningtias; Riantini; Ernis Sefita; Rachma Shaumi	Women	138.02	5	Did not advance		5
Taufik Gautama Asbi; Julius Anthonius George; Robert Parasian; Rury Andhani; Lusje Olha Bojoh; Conny Eufke Sumampouw	Mixed	213.51	7	Did not advance		7

== Canoeing ==
=== Sprint ===
Athlete	Event	Heats		Semifinal		Final	
Athlete	Event	Time	Rank	Time	Rank	Time	Rank
Rudiansyah	Men's C-1 1000 m	4:24.798	5 QS	4:51.652	3 QF	4:58.328	8
Rudiansyah; Anwar Tarra	Men's C-2 500 m	1:55.508	5 QS	1:55.535	2 QF	1:55.408	9
Rapik Saputra	Men's K-1 1000 m	4:10.231	5 QS	4:18.417	4	Did not advance	
Indra Hidayat; Irwan	Men's K-2 500 m	1:43.413	5 QS	1:43.330	4	Did not advance	
Riska Andriyani	Women's C-1 200 m	53.968	3 QF	Bye		51.085	9
Riska Andriyani; Nur Meni	Women's C-2 200 m	—N/a		—N/a		48.347	4
Riska Andriyani; Nur Meni	Women's C-2 500 m	—N/a		—N/a		2:11.699	6

Qualification legend: QS=Semifinal; QF=Final

== Chess ==
The Indonesian Chess Association (Percasi) sent off seven athletes to compete at the 19th Asian Games in Hangzhou, China.

Athlete	Event	Win	Draw	Lost	Points	Rank
Novendra Priasmoro	Men's individual	4	2	3	5.0	14
Azarya Jodi Setyaki	Men's individual	3	2	4	4.0	24
Irene Kharisma Sukandar	Women's individual	5	1	3	5.5	10
Medina Warda Aulia	Women's individual	3	4	2	5.0	12

=== Team ===
Athlete	Event	Round 1	Round 2	Round 3	Round 4	Round 5	Round 6	Round 7	Round 8	Round 9	Final Score	Rank
Irene Kharisma Sukandar; Medina Warda Aulia; Dewi Ardhiani Anastasia Citra; Chelsie Monica Ignesias Sihite; Ummi Fisabilillah	Women's team	South Korea (KOR); W 4–0	Kazakhstan (KAZ); W 2.5–1.5	India (IND); L 0.5–3.5	Philippines (PHI); D 2.0–2.0	Vietnam (VIE); L 0.5–3.5	United Arab Emirates (UAE); L 3.5–0.5	China (CHN); L 0.5–3.5	Thailand (THA); W 4.0–0.0	Hong Kong (HKG); W 4.0–0.0	11	5

== Cricket ==
Summary

Team	Event	Group Stage	Qualifier-Quarter-Final	Quarterfinals	Semifinals	Final	Rank
Team	Event	Opposition Score	Opposition Score	Opposition Score	Opposition Score	Opposition Score	Rank
Indonesia women's	Women's tournament	Mongolia; W 187/4 (20 overs) - 15/10 (10 overs)	—N/a	Pakistan; L Match abandoned	Did not advance		5

== Cycling ==
=== BMX ===
Athlete	Event	Time Trial		Motos		Final	Rank
Athlete	Event	Time	Rank	Point	Rank	Time	Rank
I Gusti Bagus Saputra	Men's race	41.416	8	16	6	Did not advance	
Fasya Ahsana Rifki	Men's race	40.931	7	10	3	1:39.409	8
Jasmine Azzahra Setyobudi	Women's race	45.038	4	9	3	—N/a	3rd place, bronze medalist(s)
Amellya Nur Sifa	Women's race	44.904	3	6	1	—N/a	1st place, gold medalist(s)

=== Mountain biking ===
Athlete	Event	Final	
Athlete	Event	Time	Rank
Zaenal Fanani	Men's cross-country	1:45:07	7
Feri Yudoyono	Men's cross-country	1:41:50	4
Dara Latifah	Women's cross-country	1:49:21	6
Sayu Bella Sukma Dewi	Women's cross-country	1:59:27	8

=== Road ===
Athlete	Event	Final	
Athlete	Event	Time	Rank
Aiman Cahyadi	Men's road race	4:31:11	12
Terry Yudha Kusuma	Men's road race	4:32:50	21
Muhammad Andy Royan	Men's road race	OTL	-
Bernard Van Aert	Men's road race	4:36:23	39
Ayustina Delia Priatna	Women's road race	3:36:22	21
Aiman Cahyadi	Men's time trial	52:33.30	9
Ayustina Delia Priatna	Women's time trial	26:24.82	6

=== Track ===
Sprint

Athlete	Event	Qualification		Round of 16	Repechage	Quarterfinals	Semifinals	Final	
Athlete	Event	Time	Rank	Time	Time	Time	Time	Time	Rank
Wiji Lestari	Women's sprint	11.727	16 Q	+0,278 R	+0,114 L	Did not advance			

Keirin

Athlete	Event	1st Round	Repechage	2nd Round	Final
Athlete	Event	Rank	Rank	Rank	Rank
Wiji Lestari	Women's keirin	DNF R	4	Did not advance	

Qualification legend: DNF=Did not Finish; R=Repechages

Omnium

Athlete	Event	Scratch race		Tempo race		Elimination race		Sub Total points	Points race		Total points	Rank
Athlete	Event	Rank	Points	Rank	Points	Rank	Points	Sub Total points	Rank	Points	Total points	Rank
Bernard Van Aert	Men's omnium	6	30	2	38	4	34	102	9	5	107	9
Ayustina Delia Priatna	Women's omnium	8	26	6	30	7	28	84	6	25	109	6

Madison

Athlete	Event	Points	Rank
Terry Yudha Kusuma; Bernard Van Aert	Men's madison	15	6

== Diving ==
Women

Athlete	Event	Preliminary		Final	
Athlete	Event	Score	Rank	Score	Rank
Gladies Lariesa Garina Haga	1 metre springboard	—N/a		182.05	12
Gladies Lariesa Garina Haga	3 metre springboard	223.20	7	234.60	8

== Dragon boat ==
Men

Athlete	Event	Heats		Final	
Athlete	Event	Time	Rank	Time	Rank
Zubakri; Dedi Saputra; Andri Agus Mulyana; Harjuna; Tri Wahyu Buwono; Yuda Firmansyah; Indra Tri Setiawan; Joko Andriyanto; Maizir Riyondra; Mugi Harjito; Muh Burhan; Sutrisno; Sofiyanto; Angga Suwandi Putra	200m Straight Race	48.992	2	49.404	3rd place, bronze medalist(s)
Zubakri; Dedi Saputra; Andri Agus Mulyana; Harjuna; Tri Wahyu Buwono; Yuda Firmansyah; Indra Tri Setiawan; Joko Andriyanto; Maizir Riyondra; Mugi Harjito; Muh Burhan; Sutrisno; Sofiyanto; Angga Suwandi Putra	500m Straight Race	2:09.698	2	2:09.165	2nd place, silver medalist(s)
Zubakri; Dedi Saputra; Andri Agus Mulyana; Harjuna; Tri Wahyu Buwono; Yuda Firmansyah; Indra Tri Setiawan; Joko Andriyanto; Maizir Riyondra; Mugi Harjito; Muh Burhan; Sutrisno; Sofiyanto; Angga Suwandi Putra	1000m Straight Race	4:31.370	1	4:31.182	1st place, gold medalist(s)

Women

Athlete	Event	Heats		Final	
Athlete	Event	Time	Rank	Time	Rank
Ayuning Tika Vihari; Anisa Yulistiawan; Fazriah Nurbayan; Cinta Priendtisca Nayomi; Dayumin; Raudani Fitra; Iin Rosiana Damiri; Maryati; Sella Monim; Nadia Hafiza; Ramla Baharuddin; Ratih; Reski Wahyuni; Ester Yustince Daimoi	200m Straight Race	50.357	1	54.464	2nd place, silver medalist(s)
Ayuning Tika Vihari; Anisa Yulistiawan; Fazriah Nurbayan; Cinta Priendtisca Nayomi; Dayumin; Raudani Fitra; Iin Rosiana Damiri; Maryati; Sella Monim; Nadia Hafiza; Ramla Baharuddin; Ratih; Reski Wahyuni; Ester Yustince Daimoi	500m Straight Race	2:23.036	2	2:23.190	2nd place, silver medalist(s)
Ayuning Tika Vihari; Anisa Yulistiawan; Fazriah Nurbayan; Cinta Priendtisca Nayomi; Dayumin; Raudani Fitra; Iin Rosiana Damiri; Maryati; Sella Monim; Nadia Hafiza; Ramla Baharuddin; Ratih; Reski Wahyuni; Ester Yustince Daimoi	1000m Straight Race	4:58.669	2	4:55.385	2nd place, silver medalist(s)

== Equestrian ==
The Indonesian contingent sent of 1 male athlete.

Jumping

Athlete	Horse	Event	Qualification		Qualifier 1			Qualifier 2 Team Final			Final round A			Final round B		
Athlete	Horse	Event	Points	Rank	Penalties	Total	Rank	Penalties	Total	Rank	Penalties	Total	Rank	Penalties	Total	Rank
Brayen Nathan Brata-Coolen	Aragon Castello H	Individual														

== Esports ==
Dota 2

Athlete	Event	Group Stage			Quarterfinals	Semifinals	Final / BM	
Athlete	Event	Opposition Score	Opposition Score	Rank	Opposition Score	Opposition Score	Opposition Score	Rank
Randy Muhammad Sapoetra; Daud Budiawan; Muhammad Rizky Anugrah; Tri Kuncoro; Rizki Varizh Syaid; Muhammad Resky	Dota 2	Thailand (THA); L 0–1	Hong Kong (HKG); W 1–0	2	Did not advance			

Peacekeeper Elite (PUBG Mobile Asian Games Version)

Athlete	Event	Preliminary Round 1		1/8 Eliminations		Semifinals		Final	
Athlete	Event	Time	Rank	Time	Rank	Time	Rank	Time	Rank
Fajar Octa Ramadhan; Alan Raynold Kumaseh; T.M. Kausar Juventino; Ryan Jeremy Rolos; Vebryano Akbar Maulana	Peacekeeper Elite	00:52:17.581	1Q	00:54:19.860	2 Q	00:52:21.344	2 Q	00:53:22:453	4

EA Sports FC Online

Athlete	Event	Qualification	Round of 32	WB/LB Round 1	WB/LB Round 2	WB/LB Round 3	LB Round 4	LB Round 5	LB Round 6	LB Round 7	LB Final	Final	Rank
Athlete	Event	Opposition score	Opposition score	Opposition score	Opposition score	Opposition score	Opposition score	Opposition score	Opposition score	Opposition score	Opposition score	Opposition score	Rank
Mohammad Ega Rahmaditya	EA Sports FC Online	Ali Raaidh Hassan (MDV); W 2-0	Kwak Jun-hyouk (KOR); L 0-2	Yau Man Lung (HKG); W 2-0 LB	Li Sijun (CHN); W 2-0 LB	Meshari Aldhafiri (KUW); W 2-0 LB	Abdulaziz Abdullatif Faqeehi (BRN); W 2-0	Nurbakyt Mirgali (KAZ); W 2-0	Phatanasak Varanan (THA); L 0-2	Did not advance			

Street Fighter V Champion Edition

Athlete	Event	Round of 32	WB/LB Round 1	WB/LB Round 2	WB/LB Round 3	LB Round 4	LB Round 5	LB Round 6	LB Round 7	LB Final	Final	Rank
Athlete	Event	Opposition score	Opposition score	Opposition score	Opposition score	Opposition score	Opposition score	Opposition score	Opposition score	Opposition score	Opposition score	Rank
Christian Aron Jonathan	Street Fighter V	Yeh Man Ho (HKG); L 0-2	Chan Chi-hou (MAC); L 1-2	Did not advance								

== Fencing ==
Individual

Athlete	Event	Preliminary		Round of 32	Round of 16	Quarterfinals	Semifinals	Final	
Athlete	Event	Opposition score	Rank	Opposition score	Opposition score	Opposition score	Opposition score	Opposition score	Rank
Arval Raziel Ridwan Sundara	Men's épée	A Alshatti (KUW): L 3–5; N Singkham (THA): L 2–5; Yu L (CHN): L 1–5; E Alimzhanov (KAZ): L 1–5; K Alomairi (KSA): L 2–5	31	Did not advance					

== Field hockey ==
Summary

Key:

- A.E.T – After extra time.
- P – Match decided by penalty-shootout.

Team	Event	Group Stage						Semifinal	Final / BM / Pl.	
Team	Event	Opposition Score	Opposition Score	Opposition Score	Opposition Score	Opposition Score	Rank	Opposition Score	Opposition Score	Rank
Indonesia men's	Men's tournament	South Korea; L 0–10	China; L 1–5	Malaysia; L 2–9	Oman; L 2–4	Thailand; W 2–0	5	Bye	Uzbekistan; W 4–1	9
Indonesia women's	Women's tournament	China; L 0–20	Japan; L 0–7	Kazakhstan; L 1–2	Thailand; L 0–3	—N/a	5	Bye	Hong Kong; L 1–2	10

=== Men's tournament ===
The Indonesian men's field hockey team qualified for the Asian Games by reaching the Semifinals of the Asian Games Men's Field Hockey Qualifying Championship in Bangkok, Thailand.

=== Women's tournament ===
The Indonesian women's field hockey team qualified for the Asian Games by finishing fifth in the Asian Games Women's Field Hockey Qualifying Championship in Jakarta, Indonesia.

== Football ==
Summary

Team	Event	Group Stage		Round of 16	Quarter-finals	Semi-finals	Final / BM	
Team	Event	Oppositions scores	Rank	Opposition score	Opposition score	Opposition score	Opposition score	Rank
Indonesia men's	Men's tournament	Kyrgyzstan: W 2–0; Chinese Taipei: L 0–1; North Korea: L 0–1	3 Q	Uzbekistan; L 0–2	Did not advance			11

=== Men's tournament ===
Roster

The following 22 players list is the Indonesia squad for the 2022 Asian Games.

Head Coach: (Indonesia) Indra Sjafri

No.	Pos.	Player	Date of birth (age)	Caps	Goals	Club
1	GK	Adi Satryo	7 July 2001 (aged 22)	4	0	(Football Association of Indonesia) PSIS Semarang
2	DF	Bagas Kaffa	16 January 2002 (aged 21)	8	0	(Football Association of Indonesia) Barito Putera
3	DF	Andy Setyo*	16 September 1997 (aged 26)	0	0	(Football Association of Indonesia) Persikabo 1973
4	DF	Kadek Arel	4 April 2005 (aged 18)	4	0	(Football Association of Indonesia) Bali United
5	DF	Rizky Ridho (captain)	21 November 2001 (aged 21)	19	1	(Football Association of Indonesia) Persija Jakarta
6	MF	Ananda Raehan	17 December 2003 (aged 19)	7	0	(Football Association of Indonesia) PSM Makassar
7	MF	Beckham Putra	29 October 2001 (aged 21)	12	3	(Football Association of Indonesia) Persib Bandung
8	DF	George Brown	4 June 1999 (aged 24)	0	0	(Football Association of Indonesia) Persebaya Surabaya
9	FW	Ramadhan Sananta	27 November 2002 (aged 20)	13	8	(Football Association of Indonesia) Persis Solo
10	MF	Egy Maulana	7 July 2000 (aged 23)	18	8	(Football Association of Indonesia) Dewa United
11	MF	Ramai Rumakiek	19 April 2002 (aged 21)	4	0	(Football Association of Indonesia) Persipura Jayapura
12	DF	Dony Tri Pamungkas	11 January 2005 (aged 18)	0	0	(Football Association of Indonesia) Persija Jakarta
13	MF	Rachmat Irianto	3 September 1999 (aged 24)	22	1	(Football Association of Indonesia) Persib Bandung
14	MF	Robi Darwis	22 August 2003 (aged 20)	3	0	(Football Association of Indonesia) Persib Bandung
15	MF	Taufany Muslihuddin	24 March 2002 (aged 21)	6	1	(Football Association of Indonesia) Borneo Samarinda
16	DF	Haykal Alhafiz	24 March 2001 (aged 22)	8	0	(Football Association of Indonesia) PSIS Semarang
17	MF	Syahrian Abimanyu	25 April 1999 (aged 24)	14	0	(Football Association of Indonesia) Persija Jakarta
18	FW	Titan Agung	5 June 2001 (aged 22)	5	2	(Football Association of Indonesia) Bhayangkara
19	DF	Alfeandra Dewangga	28 June 2001 (aged 22)	20	0	(Football Association of Indonesia) PSIS Semarang
20	GK	Ernando Ari	27 February 2002 (aged 21)	21	0	(Football Association of Indonesia) Persebaya Surabaya
21	FW	Hugo Samir	25 January 2005 (aged 18)	0	0	(Football Association of Indonesia) Borneo Samarinda
22	GK	Daffa Fasya	7 May 2004 (aged 19)	0	0	(Football Association of Indonesia) Borneo Samarinda

* Over-aged player.

Group F

Pos	Team	Pld	W	D	L	GF	GA	GD	Pts	Qualification
1	North Korea	3	3	0	0	4	0	+4	9	Knockout stage
2	Kyrgyzstan	3	1	0	2	4	4	0	3 (Note: Head-to-head goal differences: Kyrgyzstan 4–3, Indonesia 2–1, Chinese Taipei 2–4)	Knockout stage
3	Indonesia	3	1	0	2	2	2	0	3	Knockout stage
4	Chinese Taipei	3	1	0	2	2	6	−4	3	

Source: Football – Men – Groups
Rules for classification: Group stage tierbreakers
Notes:
19 September 2023
19:30

Indonesia	2–0	Kyrgyzstan
Rumakiek 58'; Samir 90+2'	Report

Zhejiang Normal University East Stadium, Jinhua
Attendance: 1,445
Referee: Baraa Abu Aisha (Palestine)

21 September 2023
16:00

Chinese Taipei	1–0	Indonesia
Chin Wen-yen 47'	Report

Zhejiang Normal University East Stadium, Jinhua
Attendance: 894
Referee: Mohamed Javiz (Maldives)

24 September 2023
16:00

North Korea	1–0	Indonesia
Kim Yu-song 40'	Report

Zhejiang Normal University East Stadium, Jinhua
Attendance: 7,288
Referee: Khalid Al-Turais (Saudi Arabia)

== Judo ==
Key:

- 1st number — Ippon
- 2nd number — Waza-ari
- s — Shido

Men

Athlete	Event	Round of 32	Round of 16	Quarter-finals	Semi-finals	Repechage	Final / BM	Rank
Athlete	Event	Opposition Result	Opposition Result	Opposition Result	Opposition Result	Opposition Result	Opposition Result	Rank
Dewa Kadek Rama Warma Putra	–66 kg	Cheng (TPE); L 00s1–01s2	Did not advance					
I Gede Agastya Darma Wardana	+100 kg	—N/a	H Ota (JPN); L 00–10	Did not advance				

Women

Athlete	Event	Round of 32	Round of 16	Quarter-finals	Semi-finals	Repechage	Final / BM	Rank
Athlete	Event	Opposition Result	Opposition Result	Opposition Result	Opposition Result	Opposition Result	Opposition Result	Rank
Maryam March Maharani	–52 kg	—N/a	Prasertsri (THA); W 10s2–00	Khorloodoi (UAE); L 00s1–10s1	Did not advance	Shishime (JPN); W 10–00 DNS	Lkhagvasuren (MGL); L 00s2–10s2	5
Syerina	–63 kg	—N/a	M Odinaeva (TJK); L 00s1–01s2	Did not advance				

== Karate ==
=== Kata ===
Athlete	Event	Round 1		Round 2		Final/BM	
Athlete	Event	Opposition Score	Rank	Opposition Score	Rank	Opposition Score	Rank
Ahmad Zigi Zaresta Yuda	Men's Kata	38.80	5	Did not advance			
Krisda Putri Aprilia	Women's Kata	39.80	4 Q	39.30	4	Did not advance	

=== Kumite ===
Athlete	Event	Round of 32	Round of 16	Quarterfinals	Semifinals/Repechage	Final/BM	
Athlete	Event	Opposition Score	Opposition Score	Opposition Score	Opposition Score	Opposition Score	Rank
Ari Saputra	Men's kumite -60 kg	K Ly (CAM); W 8–0	M A A Islam (BAN); W 6–0	L J Christian (PHI); W 4–1	K Alpysbay (KAZ); L 3–12	M Siwakon (THA); L 6–7	4
Ignatius Joshua Kandou	Men's kumite -75 kg	Bye	Aljenaei (KUW); W 6–3	Marsaweh (JOR); L 4–6	Batican (PHI); W 5–3	Sakiyama (JPN); W 4–0	3rd place, bronze medalist(s)
Sandi Firmansah	Men's kumite -84 kg	Bye	A Babikr (QAT); W 6–1	M A A B A Malik (MAS); L 3–4	T N Do (VIE); L 2–10	Did not advance	
Cok Istri Agung Sanistyarani	Women's kumite -55 kg	—N/a	Bye	L Mansour (JOR); W 3–0	T P Ku (TPE); L 3–7	F Saadati (IRI); L 0–3	4
Ceyco Georgia Zefanya	Women's kumite -68 kg	Bye	Heydariozomcheloei (IRN); W 5–4	Kama (JPN); W 4–2	Alikul (KAZ); L 1–5	Dinh Thi (VIE); L 0–1	4
Dessyinta Rakawuni Banurea	Women's kumite +68 kg	—N/a	Bye	K Y Ho (HKG); L 0–2	Did not advance		

== Kurash ==
Women

Athlete	Event	Round of 32	Round of 16	Quarter-finals	Semi-finals	Final	
Athlete	Event	Opposition Score	Opposition Score	Opposition Score	Opposition Score	Opposition Score	Rank
Savira Diah Fitri Rizkianti	–52 kg	Bye	A Amanova (TKM); L 0–5	Did not advance			

== Marathon swimming ==
Athlete	Event	Final	
Athlete	Event	Time	Rank
Aflah Fadlan Prawira	Men's marathon 10 kilometre	1:59:06.4	7

== Modern pentathlon ==
Athlete	Event	Swimming (200 m freestyle)		Fencing (épée one touch)		Riding (show jumping)		Laser-run (shooting 10 m air pistol/ running 3200 m)		Total points	Final rank
Athlete	Event	Rank	MP points	Rank	MP points	Rank	MP points	Rank	MP points	Total points	Final rank
Samuel Christian Matulatuwa	Men's individual			23	180						
Caroline Andita Bangun	Women's individual			19	160						

== Rowing ==
The Indonesian Rowing Association (Podsi) sent their athletes to compete at the Games.

Men

Athlete	Event	Heats		Repechage		Final	
Athlete	Event	Time	Rank	Time	Rank	Time	Rank
Ihram; Memo	Double sculls	6:33.63	3 R	6:42.22	1 FA	6:27.83	3rd place, bronze medalist(s)
Ihram; Rendi Setia Maulana; Memo; Sulpianto	Quadruple sculls	6:20.67	3 R	6:15.87	2 FA	6:09.75	4
Toni Sutisna; Rio Riski Darmawan	Pair	6:57.59	5 FA	—N/a		7:03.11	5
Ferdiansyah; Asuhan Pattiha; Denri Maulidzar Alghiffari; Ardi Isadi	Four	6:31.62	2 R	6:18.41	2 FA	6:17.55	5
Rifqi Harits Taufiqurahman; Kakan Kusmana; Sulpianto; Rendi Setia Maulana; Asuhan Pattiha; Ferdiansyah; Denri Maulidzar Alghiffari; Ardi Isadi; Ujang Hasbullah	Eight	5:45.21	4 FA	—N/a		5:45.41	3rd place, bronze medalist(s)
Andryan Pardomuan; Rafiq Wijdan Yasir	Lightweight double sculls	6:31.98	4 R	7:01.56	3 FB	6:40.73	8

Women

Athlete	Event	Heats		Repechage		Final	
Athlete	Event	Time	Rank	Time	Rank	Time	Rank
Julianti; Nurtang	Double sculls	7:25.32	3 R	7:47.27	3 FB	7:34.49	7
Julianti; Nurtang; Chelsea Corputty; Mutiara Rahma Putri	Quadruple sculls	7:50.70	5 FA	—N/a		6:56.50	4
Chelsea Corputty; Mutiara Rahma Putri	Lightweight double sculls	7:07.94	4 R	7:46.22	2 FA	7:17.64	3rd place, bronze medalist(s)

== Sepak takraw ==
Indonesia only sent sepak takraw athletes to compete in Team Regu and Quadrant events.

Men

Athlete	Event	Group Stage					Semifinal	Final	
Athlete	Event	Opposition Score	Opposition Score	Opposition Score	Opposition Score	Rank	Opposition Score	Opposition Score	Rank
Diky Apriadi; Muhammad Hafidz; Rusdi; Muhammad Hardiansyah Muliang; Rijal Saiful; Abdul Halim Radjiu	Quadrant	Vietnam (VIE); W 2–1	Myanmar (MYA); W 2–0	Laos (LAO); W 2–0	—N/a	1 Q	Philippines (PHI); W 2–1	Myanmar (MYA); L 0–2	2nd place, silver medalist(s)
Diky Apriadi; Muhammad Hafidz; Rusdi; Muhammad Hardiansyah Muliang; Rijal Saiful; Jelki Ladada; Andi Try Sandi Saputra; Anwar Budiyanto; Akmal Syamsul; Victoria Eka Prasetyo	Team regu	South Korea (KOR); L 1–2	Malaysia (MAS); L 1–2	—N/a	—N/a	3	Did not advance		

Women

Athlete	Event	Group Stage					Semifinal	Final	
Athlete	Event	Opposition Score	Opposition Score	Opposition Score	Opposition Score	Rank	Opposition Score	Opposition Score	Rank
Leni; Dita Pratiwi; Florensia Cristy; Lena; Fujy Lestari; Kusnelia	Quadrant	Japan (JPN); W 2–0	Myanmar (MYA); W 2–0	Vietnam (VIE); L 1–2	—N/a	2 Q	Laos (LAO); W 2–0	Vietnam (VIE); L 1–2	2nd place, silver medalist(s)
Leni; Dita Pratiwi; Florensia Cristy; Lena; Fujy Lestari; Kusnelia; Wan Annisa Rachmadi; Fitra Siu; Dona Aulia; Asmira; Frisca Kharisma Indrasari; Asmaul Husna	Team regu	Thailand (THA); L 0–3	Japan (JPN); W 3–0	—N/a	—N/a	2 Q	South Korea (KOR); L 0–2	Did not advance	3rd place, bronze medalist(s)

== Shooting ==
The Indonesian contingent sent 23 names of athletes consisting of 12 male athletes and 11 female athletes each.

Men

Athlete	Event	Qualification		Final	
Athlete	Event	Points	Rank	Points	Rank
Fathur Gustafian	10m air rifle	625.1	23	Did not advance	
Davin Rosyiid Wibowo	10m air rifle	620.0	40	Did not advance	
Fathur Gustafian	50m rifle 3 positions	574-25x	26	Did not advance	
Davin Rosyiid Wibowo	50m rifle 3 positions	578-20x	17	Did not advance	
Trisnarmanto	50m rifle 3 positions	571-23x	32	Did not advance	
Fathur Gustafian; Davin Rosyiid Wibowo; Trisnarmanto	50m rifle 3 positions team	—N/a		1723	8
Alif Satria Bahari	10m air pistol	560-14x	46	Did not advance	
Muhamad Iqbal Raia Prabowo	10m air pistol	574-21x	22	Did not advance	
Wira Sukmana	10m air pistol	569-18x	32	Did not advance	
Alif Satria Bahari; Muhamad Iqbal Raia Prabowo; Wira Sukmana	10m air pistol team	—N/a		1703-53x	9
Anang Yulianto	25m rapid fire pistol	584-16x	4	17	5
Dewa Putu Yadi Suteja	25m rapid fire pistol	565-9x	19	Did not advance	
Totok Tri Martanto	25m rapid fire pistol	569-12x	18	Did not advance	
Anang Yulianto; Dewa Putu Yadi Suteja; Totok Tri Martanto	25m rapid fire pistol team	—N/a		1718-37x	4
Irfandi Julio	10m running target	—N/a		543-11x	16
Muhammad Badri Akbar	10m running target	—N/a		546-7x	14
Muhammad Sejahtera Dwi Putra	10m running target	—N/a		578-15x	1st place, gold medalist(s)
Irfandi Julio; Muhammad Badri Akbar; Muhammad Sejahtera Dwi Putra	10m running target team	—N/a		1667-33	3rd place, bronze medalist(s)
Irfandi Julio	10m running target mixed run	—N/a		362-5x	13
Muhammad Badri Akbar	10m running target mixed run	—N/a		358-6x	16
Muhammad Sejahtera Dwi Putra	10m running target mixed run	—N/a		378-11x	1st place, gold medalist(s)
Irfandi Julio; Muhammad Badri Akbar; Muhammad Sejahtera Dwi Putra	10m running target mixed run team	—N/a		1098-22x	3rd place, bronze medalist(s)

Women

Athlete	Event	Qualification		Final	
Athlete	Event	Points	Rank	Points	Rank
Amelia Sifaul Citra	10m air rifle	617.3	46	Did not advance	
Audrey Zahra Dhiyaanisa	10m air rifle	622.0	32	Did not advance	
Masayyu Putri Fadillah	10m air rifle	622.8	29	Did not advance	
Amelia Sifaul Citra; Audrey Zahra Dhiyaanisa; Masayyu Putri Fadillah	10m air rifle team	—N/a		1862.1	11
Audrey Zahra Dhiyaanisa	50m rifle 3 positions	584-28x	12	Did not advance	
Monica Daryanti	50m rifle 3 positions	579-28x	20	Did not advance	
Vidya Rafika Rahmatan Toyyiba	50m rifle 3 positions	570-18x	35	Did not advance	
Audrey Zahra Dhiyaanisa; Monica Daryanti; Vidya Rafika Rahmatan Toyyiba	50m rifle 3 positions team	—N/a		1733	9
Arista Perdana Putri Darmoyo	10m air pistol	573-12x	17	Did not advance	
Rifadatul Asyifa	10m air pistol	565-11x	36	Did not advance	
Adylia Safitri	Trap	104	18	Did not advance	
Feny Bachtiar	10m running target	—N/a		538-11x	8
Nourma Try Indriani	10m running target	—N/a		516-12x	13
Rica Nensi Perangin Angin	10m running target	—N/a		550-8x	5
Feny Bachtiar; Nourma Try Indriani; Rica Nensi Perangin Angin	10m running target team	—N/a		1604-31x	3rd place, bronze medalist(s)

Mixed

Athlete	Event	Qualification		Final	
Athlete	Event	Points	Rank	Points	Rank
Amelia Sifaul Citra; Fathur Gustafian	10m air rifle mixed team	622.3	14	Did not advance	
Arista Perdana Putri Darmoyo; Muhammad Iqbal Raia Prabowo	10m air pistol mixed team	572	8	Did not advance	

== Skateboarding ==
Men

Athlete	Event	Preliminary		Final	
Athlete	Event	Result	Rank	Result	Rank
Basral Graito Hutomo	Men's street	48.88	8 Q	173.79	4
Sanggoe Darma Tanjung	Men's street	68.11	4 Q	200.63	2nd place, silver medalist(s)

Women

Athlete	Event	Preliminary		Final	
Athlete	Event	Result	Rank	Result	Rank
Bunga Nyimas	Women's park	41.30	8 Q	60.41	6

== Soft tennis ==
=== Men ===
Athlete	Event	Group stage				Second Stage	Quarterfinals	Semifinals	Final / BM	
Athlete	Event	Oppositions Scores	Oppositions Scores	Oppositions Scores	Rank	Oppositions Scores	Oppositions Scores	Opposition Score	Opposition Score	Rank
Mario Harley Alibasa	Single	Y H Chen (TPE); L 2-4	J Meena (TPE); L 1-4	—N/a	3	Did not advance				
Sunu Wahyu Trijati	Single	S Han (PRK); W 4-0	T Kim (KOR); L 0-4	A G A Prasitt (THA); W 4-1	2 Q	H Yoon (KOR); L 2-4	Did not advance			
Fernando Sanger; Mario Harley Alibasa; Muhammad Hemat Bhakti Anugerah; Sunu Wahyu Trijati; Tio Juliandi Hutauruk	Team	Mongolia (MGL); W 2-1	Philippines (PHI); W 3-0	Japan (JPN); L 0-3	2 Q	—N/a		Chinese Taipei (TPE); L 0-2	Did not advance	3rd place, bronze medalist(s)

=== Women ===
Athlete	Event	Group stage				Quarterfinals	Semifinals	Final / BM	
Athlete	Event	Oppositions Scores	Oppositions Scores	Oppositions Scores	Rank	Opposition Score	Oppositions Scores	Opposition Score	Rank
Dwi Rahayu Putri	Single	N N C Zoleta (PHI); W 4-3	T Somsanit (THA); W 4-0	—N/a	1 Q	D Li (CHN); L 2–4	Did not advance		
Allif Nafiiah	Single	P L M Catindig (PHI); L 2-4	H Mun (KOR); L 2-4	—N/a	3	Did not advance			

=== Mixed ===
Athlete	Event	Group stage				Quarterfinals	Semifinals	Final / BM	
Athlete	Event	Oppositions Scores	Oppositions Scores	Rank	Opposition Score	Oppositions Scores	Opposition Score	Opposition Score	Rank
Tio Juliandi Hutauruk; Dwi Rahayu Putri	Double	T Uematsu; N Takahashi (JPN); L 0-5	M John; S Ho (CAM); W 5-0	2 Q	M Bataa; C Bataa (MGL); W 5-2	R Uchida; T Shimuta (JPN); L 1-5	Did not advance		
Fernando Sanger; Allif Nafiiah	Double	N Q Nguyen; T H Dang (VIE); W 5-0	R Uchida; T Shimuta (JPN); L 0-5	2 Q	B Kim; D Ji (KOR); L 1-5	Did not advance			

== Sport climbing ==
The Indonesian contingent sent 12 names of athletes consisting of 6 male athletes and 6 female athletes each.

Speed

Athlete	Event	Qualification		Round of 16	Quarter-finals	Semi-finals	Final / BM	
Athlete	Event	Best	Rank	Opposition Time	Opposition Time	Opposition Time	Opposition Time	Rank
Kiromal Katibin	Men's	5.161	3 Q	Lin (TPE); W 5.167–6.176	Long (CHN); L 7.407–5.052	Did not advance		
Veddriq Leonardo	Men's	4.978	1 Q	Verma (IND); W 7.452–7.620	Maimuratov (KAZ); W 5.110–Fall	Alipour (IRI); L 5.619–5.163	Wu (CHN); W 4.955–5.119	3rd place, bronze medalist(s)
Desak Made Rita Kusuma Dewi	Women's	6.600	1 Q	Nyamdoo (MGL); W 6.789–13.975	Noh (KOR); W 6.703–8.071	Niu (CHN); W 6.522–6.837	Deng (CHN); W 6.364–6.435	1st place, gold medalist(s)
Rajiah Sallsabillah	Women's	6.870	3 Q	Pannu (IND); W 7.071–9.997	Jeong (KOR); W 6.733–9.801	Deng (CHN); L 6.661–6.523	Niu (CHN); W 6.879–Fall	3rd place, bronze medalist(s)

Speed relay

Athlete	Event	Qualification		Quarter-finals	Semi-finals	Final / BM	
Athlete	Event	Time	Rank	Opposition Time	Opposition Time	Opposition Time	Rank
Kiromal Katibin; Aspar; Rahmad Adi Mulyono; Veddriq Leonardo	Men's	16.632	1 Q	Hong Kong (HKG); W 17.979–19.651	South Korea (KOR); W 16.289–16.650	China (CHN); L FS	2nd place, silver medalist(s)
Alivany Ver Khadijah; Desak Made Rita Kusuma Dewi; Nurul Iqamah; Rajiah Sallsabillah	Women's	25.834	3 Q	—N/a	South Korea (KOR); W 21.869–26.954	China (CHN); L 23.506–20.925	2nd place, silver medalist(s)

Combined

Athlete	Event	Qualification				Semi-finals				Final			
Athlete	Event	Boulder Point	Lead Point	Total	Rank	Boulder Point	Lead Point	Total	Rank	Boulder Point	Lead Point	Total	Rank
Musauwir	Men's	39.2	9.1	48.3	18 Q	14.7	33	47.7	14	Did not advance			
Rizky Simatupang	Men's	58.7	30	88.7	14 Q	14.9	54	68.9	7 Q	19.2	5	24.2	8
Sukma Lintang Cahyani	Women's	59.3	10.1	69.4	10 Q	19.46	24	43.46	10	Cancelled (Note: The women's boulder and lead final was cancelled due to rain and safety of the athletes. The semi-finals result was used as final result.)			
Nur Diatul Jannah	Women's	59.6	7.1	66.7	14 Q	6.40	24	30.40	12	Cancelled			

== Swimming ==
=== Men ===
Event	Athlete	Heats		Final	
Event	Athlete	Time	Rank	Time	Rank
50 m backstroke	Farrel Armandio Tangkas	26.38	16	Did not advance	
50 m backstroke	I Gede Siman Sudartawa	25.77	9	Did not advance	
100 m backstroke	Farrel Armandio Tangkas	56.70	11	Did not advance	
200 m backstroke	Farrel Armandio Tangkas	2:03.19	8 Q	2:02.40	6
50 m butterfly	Joe Aditya Kurniawan	24.52	6	Did not advance	
100 m butterfly	Joe Aditya Kurniawan	54.40	15	Did not advance	
50 m breaststroke	Muhammad Dwiky Raharjo	28.36	7 Q	28.52	8
100 m breaststroke	Muhammad Dwiky Raharjo	1:02.60	13	Did not advance	
200 m breaststroke	Muhammad Dwiky Raharjo	2:17.81	11	Did not advance	
50 m freestyle	Joe Aditya Kurniawan	23.67	20	Did not advance	
100 m freestyle	Nicholas Karel Subagyo	52.11	24	Did not advance	
100 m freestyle	Joe Aditya Kurniawan	51.04	20	Did not advance	
200 m freestyle	Nicholas Karel Subagyo	1:51.99	15	Did not advance	
400 m freestyle	Nicholas Karel Subagyo	3:59.07	14	Did not advance	
800 m freestyle	Nicholas Karel Subagyo	8:21.04	12	Did not advance	
1500 m freestyle	Nicholas Karel Subagyo	16:40.67	4	Did not advance	
4 × 100 m medley relay	Muhammad Dwiky Raharjo; Farrel Armandio Tangkas; Joe Aditya Kurniawan; Nicholas Karel Subagyo	3:45.45	9 R	Did not advance	

R= Reserves

=== Women ===
Event	Athlete	Heats		Final	
Event	Athlete	Time	Rank	Time	Rank
50 m backstroke	Angel Gabriella Yus	29.44	10	Did not advance	
50 m backstroke	Masniari Wolf	29.79	16	Did not advance	
50 m butterfly	Angel Gabriella Yus	28.57	18	Did not advance	
100 m backstroke	Angel Gabriella Yus	1:03.33	12	Did not advance	
100 m backstroke	Masniari Wolf	1:05.54	19	Did not advance	

=== Mixed ===
Event	Athlete	Heats		Final	
Event	Athlete	Time	Rank	Time	Rank
4 × 100 m medley relay	Masniari Wolf; Muhammad Dwiky Raharjo; Joe Aditya Kurniawan; Angel Gabriella Yus	4:01.49	7 Q	4:01.50	8

Q= Qualified

== Taekwondo ==
Kyorugi

Athlete	Event	Round of 32	Round of 16	Quarterfinal	Semifinal	Final	
Athlete	Event	Opposition Score	Opposition Score	Opposition Score	Opposition Score	Opposition Score	Rank
Muhammad Bassam Raihan	Men's −63 kg	Alireza Hosseinpour (IRI); L 0–2	Did not advance				
Ni Kadek Heni Prikasih	Women's −49 kg	Uchral Bat-Erdene (MGL); W 2–0	Guo Qing (CHN); L 0–2	Did not advance			
Megawati Tamesti Maheswari	Women's −53 kg	Bye	Julie Mam (CAM); W 2–0	Chutikan Jongkolrattanawattana (THA); L 0–2	Did not advance		

== Tennis ==
Indonesia entered 10 tennis players at the Games.

=== Men ===
Athlete	Event	Round of 64	Round of 32	Round of 16	Quarter-finals	Semi-finals	Final	
Athlete	Event	Opposition Score	Opposition Score	Opposition Score	Opposition Score	Opposition Score	Opposition Score	Rank
Muhammad Rifqi Fitriadi	Singles	Bye	Wong H-k (HKG); W 5–7, 6–4, 6-2	Zhang ZZ (CHN); L 3–6, 2–6	Did not advance			
Justin Barki	Singles	K Tang (MAC); W 6–3, 6–2	Wu YB (CHN); L 5–7, 1–6	Did not advance				
Nathan Barki; Christopher Rungkat	Doubles	—N/a	S Isroilov / F Mukhidinov (TJK); W 6–0, 6–0	P Isaro / M Jones (THA); L 3–6, 6–4, [7]–[10]	Did not advance			
Anthony Susanto; David Agung Susanto	Doubles	—N/a	A Milushev / M Shin (UZB); W 6–2, 7–5	S Myneni / R Ramanathan (IND); L 3–6, 2–6	Did not advance			

=== Women ===
Athlete	Event	Round of 64	Round of 32	Round of 16	Quarter-finals	Semi-finals	Final	
Athlete	Event	Opposition Score	Opposition Score	Opposition Score	Opposition Score	Opposition Score	Opposition Score	Rank
Janice Tjen	Singles	G Ainitdinova (KAZ); W 6–1, 6–2	Zhu L (CHN); L 3–6, 0–6	Did not advance				
Beatrice Gumulya	Singles	Bye	E Chong (HKG); L 2–6, 0–6	Did not advance				
Beatrice Gumulya; Jessy Rompies	Doubles	—N/a	Bye	SKhan / U Suhail (PAK); W 6–0, 6–0	Back D-y / Jeong B-y (KOR); L 6–4, 6^{4}–7, [4]–[10]	Did not advance		
Aldila Sutjiadi; Janice Tjen	Doubles	—N/a	A Amanmuradova / S Yuldasheva (UZB); W 6–2, 6–4	L Kumkhum / P Plipuech (THA); W 7–6^{4}, 6–3	Ku Y-w / Park S-h (KOR); W 6–2, 6–4	CHan H-c / L Chan (TPE); L 2–6, 2–6	Did not advance	3rd place, bronze medalist(s)

=== Mixed ===
Athlete	Event	Round of 64	Round of 32	Round of 16	Quarter-finals	Semi-finals	Final	
Athlete	Event	Opposition Score	Opposition Score	Opposition Score	Opposition Score	Opposition Score	Opposition Score	Rank
Christopher Rungkat; Aldila Sutjiadi	Doubles	Bye	A Bastola / A Bista (NEP); W 6–0, 6–0	P Isaro / P Plipuech (THA); W 6–2, 5–7,[10]–[5]	Chan H-c / Hsu Y-h (TPE); L 4–6, 5–7	Did not advance		
David Agung Susanto; Jessy Rompies	Doubles	Bye	D Popko / Z Rustemova (KAZ); W 6–4, 6–2	Chung Y-s / Ha N-l (KOR); L 1–6, 2–6	Did not advance			

== Triathlon ==
Individual

Athlete	Event	Swim (1.5 km)	Trans 1	Bike (39.6 km)	Trans 2	Run (10 km)	Total Time	Rank
Rashif Amila Yaqin	Men's	19:12	0:37	1:00:05	0:32	37:47	1:58:13	9

== Volleyball ==
=== Beach volleyball ===
Indonesia entered 8 beach volleyball players (4 men's and 4 women's) to compete at the Games.

Athlete	Event	Preliminary		Round of 16	Quarter-finals	Semi-finals	Final / BM	
Athlete	Event	Oppositions scores	Rank	Opposition score	Opposition score	Opposition score	Opposition score	Rank
Bintang Akbar; Mohammad Ashfiya	Men's tournament	Alnajjar–Alqishawi (PLE): W 2–0; Kaewsai–Jongklang (THA): W 2–1	1 Q	Garcia– Buytrago (PHI); W 2–1	Pourasgari– Aghajanighasab (IRI); L 1–2	Did not advance		5
Sofyan Rachman Efendi; Danangsyah Pribadi	Men's tournament	Requinton–Abdilla (PHI): W 2–1; Younousse–Tijan (QAT): L 0–2	2 Q	Abuduhalikejiang– Wu (CHN); L 0–2	Did not advance			9
Dhita Juliana; Desy Ratnasari	Women's tournament	Tam – Lei (MAC): W 2–0; Progella–Matibag (PHI): W 2–0; Wong–To (HKG): W 2–0; Naraphornrapat–Kongphopsarutawadee (THA): L 0–2	2 Q	Sari– Herdanti (INA); W 2–0	Wang– Dong (CHN); L 0–2	Did not advance		5
Nur Atika Sari; Bernadetta Shella Herdanti	Women's tournament	Rachenko – Ukolova (KAZ): W 2–1; Badalbekova–Khurshedodova (TJK): W 2–0; Hasegawa–Sakaguchi (JPN): L 0–2; Wang–Dong (CHN): L 0–2	3 Q	Dhita Juliana– Ratnasari (INA); L 0–2	Did not advance			9

=== Indoor volleyball ===
Team	Event	Group Stage		Round of 12	Quarter-finals / Pl.	Semi-finals / Pl.	Final / BM / Pl.	
Team	Event	Oppositions scores	Rank	Opposition score	Opposition score	Opposition score	Opposition score	Rank
Indonesia men's	Men's tournament	Philippines: W 3–0; Japan: L 0–3; Afghanistan: W 3–0	2 Q	China; L 1–3	Bye	Kazakhstan; W 3–2	South Korea; L 2–3	8

==== Men's tournament ====
Team roster

The following is the Indonesia roster in the men's volleyball tournament of the 2022 Asian Games.

Head coach: Jiang Jie

No.	Position	Name	Date of birth	Height	Weight	Spike	Block	2022–23 Club
	OH	Boy Arnez Arabi	22 October 2003	1.90 m (6 ft 3 in)	65 kg (143 lb)	350 cm (11 ft 6 in)	335 cm (11 ft 0 in)	(Indonesia) Jakarta LavAni Allo Bank
	MB	Hendra Kurniawan	27 May 2003	1.95 m (6 ft 5 in)	88 kg (194 lb)	355 cm (11 ft 8 in)	340 cm (11 ft 2 in)	(Indonesia) Jakarta LavAni Allo Bank
	MB	Muhammad Malizi	29 September 1994	1.93 m (6 ft 4 in)	80 kg (180 lb)	350 cm (11 ft 6 in)	335 cm (11 ft 0 in)	(Indonesia) Jakarta LavAni Allo Bank
	OH	Fahri Septian Putratama	26 September 1998	1.87 m (6 ft 2 in)	82 kg (181 lb)	345 cm (136 in)	335 cm (132 in)	(Indonesia) Jakarta LavAni Allo Bank
	MB	Hernanda Zulfi	27 January 1997	1.97 m (6 ft 6 in)	86 kg (190 lb)	350 cm (11 ft 6 in)	340 cm (11 ft 2 in)	(Indonesia) Jakarta Bhayangkara Presisi
	OH	Farhan Halim	26 April 2001	1.93 m (6 ft 4 in)	78 kg (172 lb)	355 cm (11 ft 8 in)	335 cm (11 ft 0 in)	(Indonesia) Jakarta STIN BIN
	S	Dio Zulfikri	25 December 1996	1.87 m (6 ft 2 in)	95 kg (209 lb)	325 cm (128 in)	320 cm (130 in)	(Indonesia) Jakarta LavAni Allo Bank
	OH	Agil Angga Anggara	15 May 2000	1.91 m (6 ft 3 in)	72 kg (159 lb)	340 cm (11 ft 2 in)	337 cm (11 ft 1 in)	(Indonesia) Surabaya BIN Samator
	L	Fahreza Rakha Abhinaya	6 December 1999	1.75 m (5 ft 9 in)	66 kg (146 lb)	310 cm (10 ft 2 in)	290 cm (9 ft 6 in)	(Indonesia) Jakarta Bhayangkara Presisi
	OH	Doni Haryono	21 February 1999	1.90 m (6 ft 3 in)	78 kg (172 lb)	360 cm (11 ft 10 in)	335 cm (11 ft 0 in)	(Japan) VC Nagano Tridents
	S	Jasen Natanael Kilanta	20 February 1999	1.86 m (6 ft 1 in)	95 kg (209 lb)	325 cm (10 ft 8 in)	315 cm (10 ft 4 in)	(Indonesia) Jakarta STIN BIN
	OH	Amin Kurnia Sandi Akbar	17 July 1998	1.96 m (6 ft 5 in)	86 kg (190 lb)	360 cm (11 ft 10 in)	335 cm (11 ft 0 in)	(Indonesia) Palembang Bank Sumsel Babel

Pool A

Date	Time		Score		Set 1	Set 2	Set 3	Set 4	Set 5	Total	Report
19 Sep	19:00	Indonesia	3–0	Philippines	25–22	25–23	25–20			75–65	Report
20 Sep	19:00	Japan	3–0	Indonesia	25–18	25–20	25–18			75–56	Report
21 Sep	14:30	Indonesia	3–0	Afghanistan	25–18	25–21	25–17			75–56	Report

Round of 12

22 September 2023; 19:00	China	3–1	Indonesia	Linping Sports Centre Gymnasium, Hangzhou; Attendance: 2,000; Referees: Wong Chi Chor (HKG), Shams Arahman Abdulla (QAT)
22 September 2023; 19:00	(25–17, 25–17, 23–25, 25–22); P2 Report			Linping Sports Centre Gymnasium, Hangzhou; Attendance: 2,000; Referees: Wong Chi Chor (HKG), Shams Arahman Abdulla (QAT)

7th–10th places

25 September 2023; 14:30	Indonesia	3–2	Kazakhstan	China Textile City Sports Centre Gymnasium, Hangzhou; Attendance: 2,000; Referees: Nurgazy Kokcholokov (KGZ), Jang Jong Hyang (PRK)
25 September 2023; 14:30	(25–22, 24–26, 22–25, 25–16, 15–12); P2 Report			China Textile City Sports Centre Gymnasium, Hangzhou; Attendance: 2,000; Referees: Nurgazy Kokcholokov (KGZ), Jang Jong Hyang (PRK)

7th place

26 September 2023; 14:30	Indonesia	2–3	South Korea	China Textile City Sports Centre Gymnasium, Hangzhou; Attendance: 2,600; Referees: Taisuke Togawa (JPN), Zolbayar Ganbaatar (MGL)
26 September 2023; 14:30	(27–29, 25–19, 19–25, 25–21, 8–15); P2 Report			China Textile City Sports Centre Gymnasium, Hangzhou; Attendance: 2,600; Referees: Taisuke Togawa (JPN), Zolbayar Ganbaatar (MGL)

== Weightlifting ==
Men

Athlete	Event	Snatch	Clean & Jerk	Total	Rank
Athlete	Event	Result	Result	Total	Rank
Ricko Saputra	−61 kg	128 kg	160 kg	288 kg	7
Eko Yuli Irawan	−67 kg	145 kg	−	−	−
Rahmat Erwin Abdullah	−73 kg	158 kg	201 kg	359 kg	1st place, gold medalist(s)

Women

Athlete	Event	Snatch	Clean & Jerk	Total	Rank
Athlete	Event	Result	Result	Total	Rank
Siti Nafisatul Hariroh	−49 kg	74 kg	92 kg	166 kg	9
Juliana Klarisa	−55 kg	82 kg	103 kg	185 kg	9
Windy Cantika Aisah	−55 kg	85 kg	−	−	−
Natasya Beteyob	−59 kg	91 kg	117 kg	208 kg	6
Tsabitha Alfiah Ramadani	−64 kg	100 kg	115 kg	215 kg	4
Nurul Akmal	+87 kg	115 kg	146 kg	261 kg	4

== Wrestling ==
Key:

- F – Victory by fall.
- PP – Decision by points – the loser with technical points.
- PO – Decision by points – the loser without technical points.
- ST – Great superiority – the loser without technical points and a margin of victory of at least 8 (Greco-Roman) or 10 (freestyle) points.

Men's freestyle

Athlete	Event	Qualification	Round of 16	Quarterfinal	Semifinal	Repechage 1	Repechage 2	Final / BM	
Athlete	Event	Opposition Result	Opposition Result	Opposition Result	Opposition Result	Opposition Result	Opposition Result	Opposition Result	Rank
Randa Riandesta	−86 kg	Bye	D Punia (IND); L 0–11	Did not advance					

Men's Greco-Roman

Athlete	Event	Round of 16	Quarterfinal	Semifinal	Repechage	Final / BM	
Athlete	Event	Opposition Result	Opposition Result	Opposition Result	Opposition Result	Opposition Result	Rank
Suparmanto	−60 kg	H Chung (KOR); L 3–11	Did not advance				
Muhammad Aliansyah	−67 kg	H Ryu (KOR); L 1–5	Did not advance				
Andika Sulaeman	−77 kg	R Liu (CHN); L 0–4	Did not advance				

Women's freestyle

Athlete	Event	Round of 16	Quarterfinal	Semifinal	Repechage	Final / BM	
Athlete	Event	Opposition Result	Opposition Result	Opposition Result	Opposition Result	Opposition Result	Rank
Candra Marimar	−53 kg	B Bat–Ochir (MGL); L 1–14	Did not advance				
Varadisa Septi Putri Hidayat	−76 kg	N Yamamoto (JPN); L 0–2	Did not advance				

== Wushu ==
=== Taolu ===
Athlete	Event	Event 1		Event 2		Total	Rank
Athlete	Event	Result	Rank	Result	Rank	Total	Rank
Edgar Xavier Marvelo	Men's changquan	9.786	2	—N/a		9.786	2nd place, silver medalist(s)
Harris Horatius	Men's nanquan and nangun	9.756	1	9.750	1	19.506	1st place, gold medalist(s)
Nicholas	Men's taijiquan and taijijian	9.730	9	9.726	6	19.456	6
Seraf Naro Siregar	Men's daoshu and gunshu	9.726	4	9.740	3	19.466	3rd place, bronze medalist(s)
Eugenia Diva Widodo	Women's changquan	9.650	6	—N/a		9.650	6
Tasya Puspa Dewi	Women's nanquan and nandao	9.680	5	9.686	5	19.366	4
Nandhira Mauriskha	Women's jianshu and qiangshu	9.700	6	9.700	5	19.400	5

=== Sanda ===
Athlete	Event	Round of 16	Quarter-finals	Semi-finals	Final	
Athlete	Event	Opposition Score	Opposition Score	Opposition Score	Opposition Score	Rank
Bintang Guitara	Men's –56 kg	Mohammad Karim Faqiri (AFG); W 2–1	Jiang Haidong (CHN); L 0–2	Did not advance		
Bayu Raka Putra	Men's –60 kg	Bùi Trường Giang (VIE); L 0–2	Did not advance			
Samuel Marbun	Men's –65 kg	Vikrant Baliyan (IND); W 2–1	Bakytbek Koldosh Uulu (KGZ); L WPD	Clemente Tabugara Jr. (PHI); W 2–0	Afshin Salimi (IRI); L WPD	2nd place, silver medalist(s)
Harry Brahmana	Men's –70 kg	Zhang Huan-yi (TPE); L 0–2	Did not advance			
Tharisa Dea Florentina	Women's –52 kg	—N/a	Lin Yi-ju (TPE); W WPD	Elaheh Mansourian (IRI); L WPD	Did not advance	3rd place, bronze medalist(s)

WPD= Win by point difference

== See also ==
- Indonesia at the 2022 Asian Para Games
