= Chaoba Devi Oinam =

Indian sepak takraw player

Personal information
- Nationality: Indian
- Born: 2 March 1988 (age 38)
- Height: 1.54 m (5 ft 1 in)

Sport
- Sport: Sepak takraw
Medal record
Representing India
Asian Games
Bronze medal – third place	2022 Hangzhou	Women's regu

Chaoba Devi Oinam (born 2 March 1988) is an Indian sepak takraw player. She won a bronze medal in the women's regu event at the 2022 Asian Games. The Indian team consisting of Maipak Devi Ayekpam, Chaoba Devi Oinam, Khushbu, Priya Devi Elangbam and Leirentonbi Devi Elangbam lost Thailand 10-21, 13-21 in the semifinals. In Sepak Takraw both losing semifinalists get the bronze medals.

== Early life ==
Chaoba Devi is from Manipur and her first major championship was 2014 Asian Games in South Korea. She started training at the Sports Authority of India (SAI) North-East Regional Centre from 2011 to 2016. She is currently employed as a Physical Education teacher (PET) in the Youth Services and Sports (YAS) Department, Manipur.
