= Rowing at the 2022 Asian Games – Women's lightweight double sculls =

Women's lightweight double sculls at the 2022 Asian Games
- Venue: Fuyang Water Sports Centre
- Date: 20–24 September 2022
- Competitors: 22 from 11 nations

Medalists
gold medal	Zou Jiaqi; Qiu Xiuping	China
silver medal	Luizakhon Islomova; Malika Tagmatova	Uzbekistan
bronze medal	Chelsea Corputty; Mutiara Rahma Putri	Indonesia

The women's lightweight double sculls competition at the 2022 Asian Games in Hangzhou, China, was held from 20 September to 24 September 2023 at the Fuyang Water Sports Centre. The gold medal was won by Chinese pair, Zou Jiaqi and Qiu Xiuping as they won by ten seconds over Uzbekistan pair Luizakhon Islomova and Malika Tagmatova.

== Schedule ==
All times are China Standard Time (UTC+08:00)

Date	Time	Event
Wednesday, 20 September 2023	09:00	Heats
Thursday, 21 September 2023	09:00	Repecharges
Sunday, 24 September 2023	09:00	Finals

== Results ==
=== Heats ===
- Qualification: 1 → Final A (FA), 2–6 → Repechages (R)

==== Heat 1 ====
Rank	Team	Time	Notes
1	China (CHN); Zou Jiaqi; Qiu Xiuping	6:52.43	FA
2	Uzbekistan (UZB); Luizakhon Islomova; Malika Tagmatova	7:01.80	R
3	Japan (JPN); Urara Kakishima; Emi Hirouchi	7:07.35	R
4	Indonesia (INA); Chelsea Corputty; Mutiara Rahma Putri	7:07.94	R
5	Hong Kong (HKG); Wong Sheung Yee; Winne Hung	7:09.73	R
6	Philippines (PHI); Feiza Lenton; Kharl Sha	7:32.49	R

==== Heat 2 ====
Rank	Team	Time	Notes
1	Iran (IRI); Kimia Zareei; Nazanin Malaei	6:59.11	FA
2	Thailand (THA); Rawiwan Sukkaew; Matinee Raruen	7:01.80	R
3	Chinese Taipei (TPE); Hsieh I-ching; Lee Kuan-yi	7:25.60	R
4	India (IND); Kiran; Anshika Bharti	7:27.57	R
5	South Korea (KOR); Kim Yu-jin; Ahn Hee-ju	7:27.59	R

=== Repechages ===
- Qualification: 1–2 → Final A (FA), 3–5 → Final B (FB)

==== Repechage 1 ====
Rank	Team	Time	Notes
1	Uzbekistan (UZB); Luizakhon Islomova; Malika Tagmatova	7:40.59	FA
2	Indonesia (INA); Chelsea Corputty; Mutiara Rahma Putri	7:46.22	FA
3	South Korea (KOR); Kim Yu-jin; Ahn Hee-ju	7:56.19	FB
4	Philippines (PHI); Feiza Lenton; Kharl Sha	8:05.56	FB
5	Chinese Taipei (TPE); Hsieh I-ching; Lee Kuan-yi	8:09.79	FB

==== Repechage 2 ====
Rank	Team	Time	Notes
1	Japan (JPN); Urara Kakishima; Emi Hirouchi	7:39.43	FA
2	Hong Kong (HKG); Wong Sheung Yee; Winne Hung	7:45.99	FA
3	Thailand (THA); Rawiwan Sukkaew; Matinee Raruen	7:51.59	FB
4	India (IND); Kiran; Anshika Bharti	8:01.80	FB

=== Finals ===
==== Final B ====
Rank	Team	Time
1	Thailand (THA); Rawiwan Sukkaew; Matinee Raruen	7:26.91
2	South Korea (KOR); Kim Yu-jin; Ahn Hee-ju	7:34.92
3	India (IND); Kiran; Anshika Bharti	7:40.84
4	Chinese Taipei (TPE); Hsieh I-ching; Lee Kuan-yi	7:41.62
5	Philippines (PHI); Feiza Lenton; Kharl Sha	7:45.37

==== Final A ====
Rank	Team	Time
1st place, gold medalist(s)	China (CHN); Zou Jiaqi; Qiu Xiuping	7:06.78
2nd place, silver medalist(s)	Uzbekistan (UZB); Luizakhon Islomova; Malika Tagmatova	7:16.49
3rd place, bronze medalist(s)	Indonesia (INA); Chelsea Corputty; Mutiara Rahma Putri	7:17.64
4	Iran (IRI); Kimia Zareei; Nazanin Malaei	7:17.90
5	Japan (JPN); Urara Kakishima; Emi Hirouchi	7:18.01
6	Hong Kong (HKG); Wong Sheung Yee; Winne Hung	7:25.27
