= Khushbu (sepak takraw) =

Indian sepak takraw player

Khusbhu
Personal information
- Nationality: Indian
- Born: 24 June 1995 (age 31)
- Height: 1.58 m (5 ft 2 in)

Sport
- Sport: Sepak takraw
Medal record
Representing India
Asian Games
Bronze medal – third place	2022 Hangzhou	Women's regu

Khusbhu (born 24 June 1995) is an Indian sepak takraw player. She won a bronze medal in the women's regu event at the 2022 Asian Games. The Indian team consisting of Maipak Devi Ayekpam, Chaoba Devi Oinam, Khushbu, Priya Devi Elangbam and Leirentonbi Devi Elangbam lost Thailand 10–21, 13–21 in the semifinals. In Sepak Takraw both losing semifinalists get the bronze medals.
