= Sepak takraw at the 2022 Asian Games – Women's regu =

Women's regu at the 2022 Asian Games
- Venue: Jinhua Sports Center Gymnasium
- Date: 5–7 October 2023
- Competitors: 30 from 6 nations

Medalists
gold medal	Thailand
silver medal	Vietnam
bronze medal	South Korea
bronze medal	India

The women's regu sepak takraw competition at the 2022 Asian Games was held at Jinhua Sports Center Gymnasium, Jinhua, China from 5 to 7 October 2023.

== Squads ==
China	India	Myanmar	South Korea
Chen Shishi; Zhou Jiawen; Tang Rongmei; Cui Yonghui; Chen Yan	Maipak Devi Ayekpam; Leirentonbi Devi Elangbam; Chaoba Devi Oinam; Khushbu; Priya Devi Elangbam	Khin Hnin Wai; Phyu Phyu Than; Ya Mong Zin; Khin Pa Pa Hlaing; Hsu Mon Aung	Bae Han-oul; Park Seon-ju; Wi Ji-seon; Lee Jin-hee; Jeon Gyu-mi
Thailand	Vietnam		
Primprapha Kaewkhamsai; Ratsamee Thongsod; Somruedee Pruepruk; Wiphada Chitphuan; Sirinan Khiaopak	Trần Thị Hồng Nhung; Trần Thị Ngọc Yến; Lê Thị Tú Trinh; Nguyễn Thị Yến; Nguyễn Thị Ngọc Huyền		

== Results ==
All times are China Standard Time (UTC+08:00)

=== Preliminary ===
==== Group A ====
Pos	Team	Pld	W	L	SF	SA	SD	Pts	Qualification
1	Vietnam	2	2	0	4	1	+3	4	Semifinals
2	India	2	1	1	2	3	−1	2	Semifinals
3	China	2	0	2	2	4	−2	0	

Source: OCA

Date	Time		Score		Set 1	Set 2	Set 3
05 Oct	10:00	India	0–2	Vietnam	16–21	10–21	
05 Oct	15:00	India	2–1	China	8–21	21–17	21–15
06 Oct	10:00	China	1–2	Vietnam	13–21	21–19	15–21

==== Group B ====
Pos	Team	Pld	W	L	SF	SA	SD	Pts	Qualification
1	Thailand	2	2	0	4	0	+4	4	Semifinals
2	South Korea	2	1	1	2	2	0	2	Semifinals
3	Myanmar	2	0	2	0	4	−4	0	

Source: OCA

Date	Time		Score		Set 1	Set 2	Set 3
05 Oct	10:00	South Korea	2–0	Myanmar	21–19	21–12	
05 Oct	15:00	South Korea	0–2	Thailand	7–21	10–21	
06 Oct	10:00	Myanmar	0–2	Thailand	14–21	9–21	

=== Knockout round ===
Semifinals
6 October
Vietnam	2
South Korea	0
6 October
India	0
Thailand	2

Gold medal match
7 October
Vietnam	0
Thailand	2

==== Semifinals ====
Date	Time		Score		Set 1	Set 2	Set 3
06 Oct	15:30	Vietnam	2–0	South Korea	21–9	21–7	
06 Oct	15:30	India	0–2	Thailand	10–21	13–21	

==== Gold medal match ====
Date	Time		Score		Set 1	Set 2	Set 3
07 Oct	10:30	Vietnam	0–2	Thailand	15–21	12–21	
