= Cycling at the 2022 Asian Games – Women's BMX racing =

Women's racing at the 2022 Asian Games
- Venue: Chun'an Jieshou Sports Centre
- Date: 1 October 2023
- Competitors: 8 from 4 nations

Medalists
gold medal	Amellya Nur Sifa	Indonesia
silver medal	Gu Quanquan	China
bronze medal	Jasmine Azzahra Setyobudi	Indonesia

The women's BMX racing competition at the 2022 Asian Games in Hangzhou was held on 1 October 2023 at the Chun'an Jieshou Sports Centre.

== Schedule ==
All times are China Standard Time (UTC+08:00)

Date	Time	Event
Sunday, 1 October 2023	09:05	Time trial
Sunday, 1 October 2023	09:52	Motos

== Results ==
Legend

- DNF — Did not finish
- DNS — Did not start

=== Time trial ===
Rank	Athlete	Time
1	Gu Quanquan (CHN)	42.393
2	Wang Mengyao (CHN)	43.495
3	Amellya Nur Sifa (INA)	44.904
4	Jasmine Azzahra Setyobudi (INA)	45.038
5	Kim Tae-young (KOR)	46.731
6	Chutikan Kitwanitsathian (THA)	47.082
7	Waranya Saetae (THA)	49.144
8	Park A-yeon (KOR)	49.581

=== Motos ===
Rank	Athlete	Run 1		Run 2		Run 3		Total
Rank	Athlete	Time	Pts	Time	Pts	Time	Pts	Total
1st place, gold medalist(s)	Amellya Nur Sifa (INA)	44.065	3	43.290	2	43.918	1	6
2nd place, silver medalist(s)	Gu Quanquan (CHN)	42.483	1	41.827	1	44.964	4	6
3rd place, bronze medalist(s)	Jasmine Azzahra Setyobudi (INA)	45.244	4	43.551	3	43.956	2	9
4	Wang Mengyao (CHN)	43.548	2	1:03.181	5	44.404	3	10
5	Kim Tae-young (KOR)	47.328	7	1:08.178	6	45.283	5	18
6	Waranya Saetae (THA)	46.478	5	1:48.908	7	45.522	6	18
7	Park A-yeon (KOR)	47.499	8	47.511	4	47.818	7	19
8	Chutikan Kitwanitsathian (THA)	46.837	6	DNF	8	DNS	10	24
