= Dragon boat at the 2022 Asian Games – Men's 1000 metres =

Men's 1000 metres at the 2022 Asian Games
- Venue: Wenzhou Dragon Boat Centre
- Date: 6 October 2023
- Competitors: 154 from 11 nations

Medalists
gold medal	Indonesia
silver medal	China
bronze medal	Myanmar

The men's dragon boat 1000 metres competition at the 2022 Asian Games was held on 6 October 2023.

== Schedule ==
All times are China Standard Time (UTC+08:00)

Date	Time	Event
Friday, 6 October 2023	09:00	Heats
Friday, 6 October 2023	10:10	Semifinals
Friday, 6 October 2023	11:20	Finals

== Squads ==
Cambodia	China	Chinese Taipei	Hong Kong
Cheat Nisith; Horl Dale; La Soknim; Leng Sothea; Ly Mouslim; Ly Torhieth; Meas Sam Oun; Meas Sinat; Ok Mathel; San Makara; Sin Visal; Sothea Lyhieng; Vorn Phanet; Vutha Ratana	Chen Fangjia; Chen Zihuan; Feng Chaochao; Li Chuan; Liu Yu; Lü Luhui; Shu Liang; Sun Jiahao; Wang Liang; Wang Xiaodong; Yang Hailei; Yu Haijie; Zhang Zhicheng; Zheng Jiaxin	Chen Rui-huang; Chen Tsung; Chen Tzu-hsien; Chien Cheng-yen; Chou Chih-wei; Chou En-ping; Hsieh Chang-yi; Lin Min-hao; Lin Sheng-ru; Lu En; Tseng Hsiang-hsuan; Tuan Yen-yu; Wu Chen-po; Wu Chun-chieh	Ho Pui Lun; Huen Kui Chun; Hung Tsz Hin; Keung Tsz Lok; Ko Kit Wang; Lam Ho Tsun; Lau Chin Ho; Justin Lau; Lee Kin Ho; Li Cai; Mak Tik Weng; Sim Shing Ho; Tang Ho Chung; Wong Ka Ho
Indonesia	Macau	Malaysia	Myanmar
Joko Andriyanto; Muh Burhan; Tri Wahyu Buwono; Yuda Firmansyah; Mugi Harjito; Harjuna; Andri Agus Mulyana; Angga Suwandi Putra; Maizir Riyondra; Dedi Saputra; Indra Tri Setiawan; Sofiyanto; Sutrisno; Zubakri	Chan Chi Hang; Chan Ka Meng; Cheang Ka Lok; Fong Chi Long; Ho Seong U; Ho Song Hei; Ieong Meng Ut; Lam Chon Wong; Lam Wa Heng; Lei Man U; Loi Chi On; Lok Weng Long; Sou Pak Hou; Wu Pou Fai	Ridzuan Abdul Aziz; Nur Rahman Abdullah; Adib Kamaruzrizan; Ahmad Azfaruddin Lukman; Montoya Raw Michael; Nazrin Najib; Nik Afiq Nik Mazli; Ahmad Ariff Rasydan; Bahij Rabbani Rizal; Mirza Adli Shaharaziz; Shahrin Haziq Shahbireen; Khairul Naim Zainal; Ahmad Amir Khan Zainalabadin; Aiman Zamberi	Hein Soe; Htoo Htoo Aung; Myint Ko Ko; Myo Hlaing Win; Naing Lin Oo; Pyae Phyo Thant; Pyae Sone Aung; Saw Kaung Kaung San; Saw Moe Aung; Saw Niang Lin Kyaw; Thant Zin Oo; Tin Ko Ko; Yu Ya Maung; Zaw Zaw Tun
North Korea	South Korea	Thailand	
Choe Kwang-ryong; Ho Jin-bom; Hwang Chol-song; Jon Chung-hyok; Kim Chol-hyok; Kim Jin-il; Kim Kyong-guk; Kim Sok-chol; O In-guk; Ri Hun; Ri Yong-hyok; Yang Chol-jin; Yun Kyong-il; Yun Yong-ho	An Hyun-jin; Cho Young-bhin; Gu Ja-uk; Hwang Min-gyu; Kang Shin-hong; Kim Hwi-ju; Kim Hyun-soo; Kim Young-chae; Lee Jae-young; Lee Je-hyeong; Oh Hae-seong; Park Cheol-min; Shin Dong-jin; Sim Hyoun-joon	Sukon Boonem; Kasemsit Borriboonwasin; Chaiyakarn Choochuen; Suradet Faengnoi; Pornprom Kramsuk; Natthapon Kreepkamrai; Suwan Kwanthong; Phatthara Sangdet; Somchai Sangmuang; Chitsanupong Sangpan; Nopphadol Sangthuang; Vinya Seechomchuen; Pornchai Tesdee; Phakdee Wannamanee	

== Results ==
=== Heats ===
- Qualification: 1 + Next best time → Grand final (GF), Rest → Semifinals (SF)

==== Heat 1 ====
Rank	Team	Time	Notes
1	Indonesia	4:31.790	GF
2	Myanmar	4:31.826	GF
3	Malaysia	4:36.867	SF
4	South Korea	4:42.777	SF
5	Macau	4:43.550	SF
6	Hong Kong	5:00.569	SF

==== Heat 2 ====
Rank	Team	Time	Notes
1	China	4:32.041	GF
2	Thailand	4:32.528	SF
3	Chinese Taipei	4:42.709	SF
4	North Korea	4:45.162	SF
5	Cambodia	4:45.739	SF

=== Semifinals ===
- Qualification: 1 + Next best time → Grand final (GF), Rest → Minor final (MF)

==== Semifinal 1 ====
Rank	Team	Time	Notes
1	South Korea	4:36.804	GF
2	Thailand	4:40.181	MF
3	Macau	4:55.903	MF
4	Hong Kong	5:10.947	MF

==== Semifinal 2 ====
Rank	Team	Time	Notes
1	North Korea	4:37.399	GF
2	Chinese Taipei	4:38.266	GF
3	Malaysia	4:42.420	MF
4	Cambodia	4:45.093	MF

=== Finals ===
==== Minor final ====
Rank	Team	Time
1	Malaysia	4:40.912
2	Thailand	4:40.952
3	Macau	4:44.989
4	Cambodia	4:47.379
5	Hong Kong	4:49.389

==== Grand final ====
Rank	Team	Time
1st place, gold medalist(s)	Indonesia	4:31.135
2nd place, silver medalist(s)	China	4:31.182
3rd place, bronze medalist(s)	Myanmar	4:32.959
4	North Korea	4:33.325
5	South Korea	4:33.679
6	Chinese Taipei	4:35.812
