= Amellya Nur Sifa =

Indonesian cyclist

Personal information
- Born: 9 July 2003 (age 23) Temanggung, Indonesia

Cycling career
- Sport: Cycling
Medal record
Women's cycling
Representing Indonesia
Asian Games
Gold medal – first place	2022 Hangzhou	BMX race

Amellya Nur Sifa (born 9 July 2003) is an Indonesian BMX cyclist. She represented Indonesia at the 2022 Asian Games and clinched an historic gold medal for Indonesia in the BMX race cycling event.
