= Leirentonbi Devi Elangbam =

Indian speak takraw player

Personal information
- Nationality: Indian
- Born: 2 March 1999 (age 27)
- Height: 1.57 m (5 ft 2 in)

Sport
- Sport: Sepak takraw
Medal record
Representing India
Asian Games
Bronze medal – third place	2022 Hangzhou	Women's regu

Leirentonbi Devi Elangbam (born 2 March 1999) is an Indian sepak takraw player. She won a bronze medal in the women's regu event at the 2022 Asian Games. The Indian team consisting of Maipak Devi Ayekpam, Chaoba Devi Oinam, Khushbu, Priya Devi Elangbam and Leirentonbi Devi Elangbam lost Thailand 10-21, 13-21 in the semifinals. In Sepak Takraw both losing semifinalists get the bronze medals.
