= Dragon boat at the 2022 Asian Games – Women's 500 metres =

Women's 500 metres at the 2022 Asian Games
- Venue: Wenzhou Dragon Boat Centre
- Date: 5 October 2023
- Competitors: 126 from 9 nations

Medalists
gold medal	China
silver medal	Indonesia
bronze medal	Myanmar

The women's dragon boat 500 metres competition at the 2022 Asian Games was held on 5 October 2023.

== Schedule ==
All times are China Standard Time (UTC+08:00)

Date	Time	Event
Thursday, 5 October 2023	09:14	Heats
Thursday, 5 October 2023	10:01	Semifinal
Thursday, 5 October 2023	10:48	Finals

== Squads ==
China	Hong Kong	Indonesia	Macau
Cheng Lingzhi; Ding Sijie; Fan Yiting; Li Shuqi; Li Zhixian; Luo Meng; Shi Yingying; Sun Yang; Wang Ji; Wang Li; Wang Ying; Xue Lina; Yu Shimeng; Zhu Xiaoli	Chau Tsz Yan; Cheung Chung Ho; Keung Oi Yee; Ko Wai Man; Angel Lai; Leung Ka Ki; Inglid Li; Anna Sin; Tam Tsz Wai; Melanie Tang; Peggy To; Wong Lap Man; Wong Yuet Ching; Wu Cheuk Wai	Ramla Baharuddin; Ester Yustince Daimoi; Iin Rosiana Damiri; Dayumin; Raudani Fitra; Nadia Hafiza; Maryati; Sella Monim; Cinta Priendtisca Nayomi; Fazriah Nurbayan; Ratih; Ayuning Tika Vihari; Reski Wahyuni; Anisa Yulistiawan	Becky Chan; Hollie Chan; Chan Ka Hei; Chan Ut Sam; Cheng Ka I; Cheong Ka Ian; Chu Hao Lei; Leong Im U; Lin Kim Hong; Lo Pui San; Lou Man Kei; Rosita Nascimento Gaspar; Ng Chi Ian; Tam Si Long
Myanmar	North Korea	Singapore	South Korea
Hla Hla Htwe; Khin Su Su Aung; Lin Lin Kyaw; Man Huai Phawng; Moe Ma Ma; Myint Myint Soe; Phyu Phyu Aung; San San Moe; Saw Myat Thu; Soe Sandar; Soe Soe Kyaw; Su Wai Phyo; Thet Phyo Naing; Win Win Htwe	Cha Un-gyong; Cha Un-yong; Choe Pom-sun; Ho Su-jong; Jon Uh-jong; Jong Chol-gyong; Jong Ye-song; Kim Song-hye; Ko Haeng-bok; O Su-rim; Oh Un-ha; Om Jin-gyong; Ri Kyong-hui; Ri Sun-mi	Chan Day Ying; Chua Jia Min; Janice Goh; Karis Khoo; Lai Xian Hui; Lew Si Hsien; Chloe Neo; Evette Neo; Ashleigh Ng; Denise Lindsey Ng; Tan Ji Xuan; Vanessa Tan; Eunice Thiam; Janice Yoong	Byun Eun-jeong; Cha Tae-hee; Cho Soo-bin; Han Sol-hee; Jeong Ji-won; Ju Hee; Ju Yun-woo; Kim Da-bin; Kim Hyeon-hee; Kim Yeo-jin; Lee Hyeon-joo; Lim Sung-hwa; Tak Su-jin; Yun Ye-bom
Thailand			
Jaruwan Chaikan; Ketkanok Chomchey; Jirawan Hankhamla; Praewpan Kawsri; Watcharaporn Khadtiya; Pranchalee Moonkasem; Patthama Nanthain; Nipaporn Nopsri; Arisara Pantulap; Sukanya Poradok; Anuthida Saeheng; Thitima Sukrat; Onuma Teeranaew; Benjamas Woranuch			

== Results ==
=== Heats ===
- Qualification: 1 + Next best time → Grand final (GF), Rest → Semifinal (SF)

==== Heat 1 ====
Rank	Team	Time	Notes
1	China	2:21.897	GF
2	Myanmar	2:24.800	SF
3	Thailand	2:25.064	SF
4	Singapore	2:29.821	SF
5	Macau	2:35.231	SF

==== Heat 2 ====
Rank	Team	Time	Notes
1	Indonesia	2:23.036	GF
2	South Korea	2:24.093	GF
3	North Korea	2:24.510	SF
4	Hong Kong	2:37.461	SF

=== Semifinal ===
- Qualification: 1–3 → Grand final (GF), Rest → Minor final (MF)

Rank	Team	Time	Notes
1	North Korea	2:24.310	GF
2	Myanmar	2:24.417	GF
3	Thailand	2:24.884	GF
4	Singapore	2:25.674	MF
5	Hong Kong	2:28.937	MF
6	Macau	2:33.004	MF

=== Finals ===
==== Minor final ====
Rank	Team	Time
1	Singapore	2:28.511
2	Hong Kong	2:31.045
3	Macau	2:33.972

==== Grand final ====
Rank	Team	Time
1st place, gold medalist(s)	China	2:21.360
2nd place, silver medalist(s)	Indonesia	2:23.190
3rd place, bronze medalist(s)	Myanmar	2:25.680
4	Thailand	2:26.400
5	North Korea	2:26.900
6	South Korea	2:27.260
