= Sepak takraw at the 2022 Asian Games – Women's team regu =

Women's team regu at the 2022 Asian Games
- Venue: Jinhua Sports Center Gymnasium
- Date: 24–29 September 2023
- Competitors: 68 from 6 nations

Medalists
gold medal	Thailand
silver medal	South Korea
bronze medal	Laos
bronze medal	Indonesia

The women's team regu sepak takraw competition at the 2022 Asian Games was held at Jinhua Sports Center Gymnasium, Jinhua, Zhejiang from 24 to 29 September 2023.

== Squads ==
China	Indonesia	Japan	Laos
Chen Jiajia; Chen Shishi; Han Kai; Zhou Jiawen; Feng Jingyan; Tang Rongmei; Lao Tianxue; Cui Yonghui; Chen Yan; Chen Xinxia	Asmira; Leni; Dita Pratiwi; Fujy Lestari; Florensia Cristy; Lena; Wan Annisa Rachmadi; Asmaaul Husna; Kusnelia; Dona Aulia; Fitra Siu; Frisca Kharisma Indrasari	Nagisa Makio; Chinatsu Sato; Yuumi Kawamata; Yuri Tanaka; Nanako Takahashi; Chihiro Aoyama; Chinatsu Saegusa; Chinatsu Kobayashi; Kayo Togami; Hinata Shiono; Minami Onda; Ayaka Ihara	Aksonesavanh Philavong; Lae Inthavong; Koy Xayavong; Norkham Vongxay; Nouandam Volabouth; Aliya Navasit; Vansone Bouavong; Sone Amphay Soulinthone; Neechapad Mapha; Namfonh Morladok
South Korea	Thailand		
Kim Ji-eun; Kim Se-young; Bae Han-oul; Park Seon-ju; Choi Ji-na; Lee Min-ju; Wi Ji-seon; Park Sung-gyung; Han Ye-ji; Bae Chae-eun; Jo Seo-hyeon; Jeon Gyu-mi	Masaya Duangsri; Primprapha Kaewkhamsai; Kaewjai Pumsawangkaew; Pruksa Maneewong; Ratsamee Thongsod; Manlika Bunthod; Somruedee Pruepruk; Wiphada Chitphuan; Sirinan Khiaopak; Usa Srikhamlue; Nipaporn Salupphon; Wassana Soiraya		

== Results ==
All times are China Standard Time (UTC+08:00)

=== Preliminary ===
==== Group A ====
Pos	Team	Pld	W	L	MF	MA	MD	Pts	Qualification
1	Thailand	2	2	0	6	0	+6	4	Semifinals
2	Indonesia	2	1	1	3	3	0	2	Semifinals
3	Japan	2	0	2	0	6	−6	0	

Source: OCA

Date	Time		Score		Regu 1			Regu 2			Regu 3		
Date	Time		Score		Set 1	Set 2	Set 3	Set 1	Set 2	Set 3	Set 1	Set 2	Set 3
24 Sep	14:00	Thailand	3–0	Indonesia	2–0			2–0			2–0		
24 Sep	14:00	Thailand	3–0	Indonesia	21–6	21–9		21–12	21–13		21–15	21–8	
25 Sep	14:00	Thailand	3–0	Japan	2–0			2–0			2–0		
25 Sep	14:00	Thailand	3–0	Japan	21–3	21–7		21–6	21–6		21–9	21–5	
26 Sep	14:00	Indonesia	3–0	Japan	2–0			2–0			2–0		
26 Sep	14:00	Indonesia	3–0	Japan	21–11	21–6		21–18	21–16		21–7	21–11	

==== Group B ====
Pos	Team	Pld	W	L	MF	MA	MD	Pts	Qualification
1	South Korea	2	2	0	6	0	+6	4	Semifinals
2	Laos	2	1	1	2	4	−2	2	Semifinals
3	China	2	0	2	1	5	−4	0	

Source: OCA

Date	Time		Score		Regu 1			Regu 2			Regu 3		
Date	Time		Score		Set 1	Set 2	Set 3	Set 1	Set 2	Set 3	Set 1	Set 2	Set 3
24 Sep	14:00	South Korea	3–0	China	2–0			2–0			2–0		
24 Sep	14:00	South Korea	3–0	China	21–17	21–10		21–14	21–14		21–10	21–13	
25 Sep	14:00	South Korea	3–0	Laos	2–1			2–0			2–0		
25 Sep	14:00	South Korea	3–0	Laos	21–7	21–23	21–8	21–12	21–10		21–18	21–7	
26 Sep	14:00	Laos	2–1	China	0–2			2–1			2–0		
26 Sep	14:00	Laos	2–1	China	13–21	8–21		14–21	21–14	21–12	21–10	21–19	

=== Knockout match ===
Semifinals
28 September
Thailand	2
Laos	0
28 September
Indonesia	0
South Korea	2

Gold medal match
29 September
Thailand	2
South Korea	0

==== Semifinals ====
Date	Time		Score		Regu 1			Regu 2			Regu 3		
Date	Time		Score		Set 1	Set 2	Set 3	Set 1	Set 2	Set 3	Set 1	Set 2	Set 3
28 Sep	09:00	Thailand	2–0	Laos	2–0			2–0					
28 Sep	09:00	Thailand	2–0	Laos	21–10	21–10		21–7	21–4				
28 Sep	14:00	Indonesia	0–2	South Korea	1–2			0–2					
28 Sep	14:00	Indonesia	0–2	South Korea	23–21	21–23	16–21	12–21	17–21				

==== Gold medal match ====
Date	Time		Score		Regu 1			Regu 2			Regu 3		
Date	Time		Score		Set 1	Set 2	Set 3	Set 1	Set 2	Set 3	Set 1	Set 2	Set 3
29 Sep	09:00	Thailand	2–0	South Korea	2–0			2–0					
29 Sep	09:00	Thailand	2–0	South Korea	21–13	21–4		21–17	21–16				
