= Mutiara Rahma Putri =

Indonesian rower (born 2004)

Personal information
- Nationality: Indonesian
- Born: 7 July 2004 (age 22) Jambi City, Jambi, Indonesia

Sport
- Country: Indonesia
- Sport: Rowing
- Events: Lightweight single & double sculls
Medal record
Women's rowing
Representing Indonesia
Asian Games
Bronze medal – third place	2022 Hangzhou	Lightweight double sculls
Asian Championships
Bronze medal – third place	2021 Ban Chang	Quadruple sculls
SEA Games
Silver medal – second place	2021 Vietnam	Lightweight double sculls
Silver medal – second place	2021 Vietnam	Lightweight quadruple sculls
Bronze medal – third place	2019 Philippines	Lightweight single sculls
Bronze medal – third place	2025 Thailand	Quadruple sculls

Mutiara Rahma Putri (born 7 July 2004) is an Indonesian rower. She competed in the women's lightweight double sculls event at the 2020 Summer Olympics at the age of 17. She won the bronze medal in the lightweight double sculls at the 2022 Asian Games. In the SEA Games, Putri has collected 2 silver in 2021 and a bronze in 2019.
