= Sepak takraw at the 2022 Asian Games – Men's quadrant =

Men's quadrant at the 2022 Asian Games
- Venue: Jinhua Sports Center Gymnasium
- Date: 1–4 October 2023
- Competitors: 54 from 9 nations

Medalists
gold medal	Myanmar
silver medal	Indonesia
bronze medal	Philippines
bronze medal	Japan

Sepak takraw at the 2022 Asian Games is being held at Jinhua Sports Center Gymnasium, Jinhua, Zhejiang from 1 to 4 October 2023.

== Squads ==
India	Indonesia	Japan	Laos
Niken Singh Khangembam; Akash Yumnam; Shiva Kumar Chakali; Sandeep Kumar; Malemnganba Sorokhaibam; Arun	Diky Apriyadi; Muhammad Hardiansyah Muliang; Saiful Rijal; Muhammad Hafidz; Rusdi; Abdul Halim Radjiu	Yuki Sato; Seiya Takano; Ryota Haruhara; Toshitaka Naito; Wataru Narawa; Yota Ichikawa	Daovy Xanavongxay; Phitthasanh Bounpaseuth; Noum Souvannalith; Kantana Nanthisen; Adong Phoumisin; Soukkaserm Chanthahieng
Myanmar	Philippines	Singapore	South Korea
Thant Zin Oo; Aung Khant Thu; Zin Min Oo; Thant Zin Tun; Zin Ko Ko; Shein Wunna Zaw	Jason Huerte; Mark Joseph Gonzales; Rheyjey Ortouste; Ronsited Gabayeron; Jom Lerry Rafael; Vince Alyson Torno	Afif Safiee; Asy Syariq Khalid; Ramli Saari; Umar Mohtar; Irfain Zurkanaen; Yusof Hasli	Lim Tae-gyun; Lee Jun-uk; Im An-soo; Jeong Won-deok; Jeong Ha-sung; Lee Woo-jin
Vietnam			
Nguyễn Hoàng Lân; Nguyễn Văn Lý; Ngô Thành Long; Huỳnh Ngọc Sang; Đầu Văn Hoàng; Vương Minh Châu			

== Results ==
All times are China Standard Time (UTC+08:00)

=== Preliminary ===
==== Group A ====
Pos	Team	Pld	W	L	SF	SA	SD	Pts	Qualification
1	Indonesia	3	3	0	6	1	+5	6	Semifinals
2	Myanmar	3	2	1	4	4	0	4	Semifinals
3	Vietnam	3	1	2	4	4	0	2	
4	Laos	3	0	3	1	6	−5	0	

Source: OCA

Date	Time		Score		Set 1	Set 2	Set 3
01 Oct	09:00	Indonesia	2–1	Vietnam	21–17	19–21	21–11
01 Oct	09:00	Myanmar	2–1	Laos	19–21	21–18	22–20
01 Oct	15:00	Indonesia	2–0	Laos	21–11	21–19	
02 Oct	09:00	Indonesia	2–0	Myanmar	22–20	21–19	
02 Oct	09:00	Laos	0–2	Vietnam	16–21	16–21	
02 Oct	14:00	Vietnam	1–2	Myanmar	22–20	19–21	19–21

==== Group B ====
Pos	Team	Pld	W	L	SF	SA	SD	Pts	Qualification
1	Japan	4	3	1	7	3	+4	6	Semifinals
2	Philippines	4	3	1	6	4	+2	6	Semifinals
3	South Korea	4	2	2	6	5	+1	4	
4	India	4	2	2	5	4	+1	4	
5	Singapore	4	0	4	0	8	−8	0	

Source: OCA

Date	Time		Score		Set 1	Set 2	Set 3
01 Oct	10:00	South Korea	2–0	Singapore	21–7	21–11	
01 Oct	10:00	Japan	1–2	Philippines	18–21	21–11	19–21
01 Oct	14:00	South Korea	1–2	Philippines	17–21	21–11	12–21
01 Oct	14:00	Japan	2–0	India	21–14	21–16	
02 Oct	10:00	Japan	2–1	South Korea	21–14	20–22	21–7
02 Oct	10:00	Singapore	0–2	India	7–21	15–21	
02 Oct	15:00	Philippines	0–2	India	16–21	15–21	
02 Oct	15:00	Japan	2–0	Singapore	21–18	21–10	
03 Oct	09:00	Philippines	2–0	Singapore	21–8	21–15	
03 Oct	09:00	India	1–2	South Korea	16–21	21–16	16–21

=== Knockout round ===
Semifinals
3 October
Indonesia	2
Philippines	1
3 October
Myanmar	2
Japan	1

Gold medal match
4 October
Indonesia	0
Myanmar	2

==== Semifinals ====
Date	Time		Score		Set 1	Set 2	Set 3
03 Oct	14:00	Indonesia	2–1	Philippines	15–21	25–24	21–17
03 Oct	14:00	Myanmar	2–1	Japan	21–9	18–21	21–15

==== Gold medal match ====
Date	Time		Score		Set 1	Set 2	Set 3
04 Oct	09:00	Indonesia	0–2	Myanmar	13–21	22–24	
