= Priya Devi Elangbam =

Indian speak takraw player (born 2000)

Personal information
- Nationality: Indian
- Born: 17 February 2000 (age 26)

Sport
- Sport: Sepak takraw
Medal record
Representing India
Asian Games
Bronze medal – third place	2022 Hangzhou	Women's regu

Priya Devi Elangbam (born 17 February 2000) is an Indian sepak takraw player. She won a bronze medal in the women's regu event at the 2022 Asian Games.
