= Maipak Devi Ayekpam =

Indian sepak takraw player

Personal information
- Nationality: Indian
- Born: 1 March 1990 (age 36)
- Height: 1.60 m (5 ft 3 in)

Sport
- Sport: Sepak takraw
Medal record
Representing India
Asian Games
Bronze medal – third place	2022 Hangzhou	Women's regu

Maipak Devi Ayekpam (born 1 March 1990) is an Indian sepak takraw player. She won a bronze medal in the women's regu event at the 2022 Asian Games. The Indian team consisting of Maipak Devi Ayekpam, Chaoba Devi Oinam, Khushbu, Priya Devi Elangbam and Leirentombi Devi Elangbam lost Thailand 10-21, 13-21 in the semifinals. In Sepak Takraw both losing semifinalists get the bronze medals.
