= Myanmar at the 2022 Asian Games =

- IOC code: MYA
- NOC: Myanmar Olympic Committee

in Hangzhou, China 23 September 2023 – 8 October 2023
- Medals Ranked 27th: Gold 1 Silver 0 Bronze 2 Total 3

Asian Games appearances (overview)
- 1951; 1954; 1958; 1962; 1966; 1970; 1974; 1978; 1982; 1986; 1990; 1994; 1998; 2002; 2006; 2010; 2014; 2018; 2022; 2026

Myanmar competed at the 2022 Asian Games in Hangzhou, Zhejiang, China, which began on 23 September 2023 and ended on 8 October 2023. The event was scheduled to be held in September 2022 but was postponed due to the rising COVID-19 cases in China. The event was later rescheduled to be held in September–October 2023.

== Medalists ==
The following Myanmar competitors won medals at the Games.

| Medal | Name | Sport | Event | Date |
|---|---|---|---|---|
| Gold | Thant Zin Oo; Aung Khant Thu; Zin Min Oo; Thant Zin Tun; Zin Ko Ko; Shein Wunna Zaw | Sepak takraw | Men's quadrant | 4 October |
| Bronze | Hla Hla Htwe; Khin Su Su Aung; Lin Lin Kyaw; Man Huai Phawng; Moe Ma Ma; Myint Myint Soe; Phyu Phyu Aung; San San Moe; Saw Myat Thu; Soe Sandar; Soe Soe Kyaw; Su Wai Phyo; Thet Phyo Naing; Win Win Htwe | Dragon boat | Women's 500 m | 5 October |
| Bronze | >Hein Soe; Htoo Htoo Aung; Myint Ko Ko; Myo Hlaing Win; Naing Lin Oo; Pyae Phyo Thant; Pyae Sone Aung; Saw Kaung Kaung San; Saw Moe Aung; Saw Niang Lin Kyaw; Thant Zin Oo; Tin Ko Ko; Yu Ya Maung; Zaw Zaw Tun | Dragon boat | Men's 1000 m | 6 October |

=== Medals by sport ===
Medals by sport
| Sport | Gold | Silver | Bronze | Total |
|---|---|---|---|---|
| Sepak takraw | 1 | 0 | 0 | 1 |
| Dragon boat | 0 | 0 | 2 | 2 |
| Total | 1 | 0 | 2 | 3 |

== Sepak takraw ==
Men

| Athlete | Event | Group stage | | | | Semi-finals | Final | |
| Athlete | Event | Opposition Score | Opposition Score | Opposition Score | Rank | Opposition Score | Opposition Score | Rank |
|---|---|---|---|---|---|---|---|---|
| Aung Khant Thu; Zin Min Oo; Zin Ko Ko; Shein Wunna Zaw; Thant Zin Tun; Thant Zin Oo | Quadrant | Laos (LAO); W (19–21, 21–18, 22–20) | Indonesia (INA); L (22–20, 21–19) | Vietnam (VIE); W (22–20, 19–21, 19–21) | 2 Q | Japan (JPN); W (21–9, 18–21, 21–15) | Indonesia (INA); W (21–13, 24–22) | 1st place, gold medalist(s) |
