= Gymnastics at the 2022 Asian Games =

- Venue: Huanglong Gymnasium
- Dates: 24 September – 7 October 2023
- Competitors: 154 from 24 nations

Gymnastics at the 2022 Asian Games were held at Huanglong Sports Centre Gymnasium, Hangzhou, China, from 24 September to 7 October 2023.

== Schedule ==
Q	Qualification	F	Final

Event↓/Date →	24th Sun	25th Mon	26th Tue	27th Wed	28th Thu	29th Fri	30th Sat	1st Sun	2nd Mon		3rd Tue		4th Wed	5th Thu	6th Fri	7th Sat
Artistic
Men's team	F															
Men's individual all-around	Q		F													
Men's floor	Q				F											
Men's pommel horse	Q				F											
Men's rings	Q				F											
Men's vault	Q					F										
Men's parallel bars	Q					F										
Men's horizontal bar	Q					F										
Women's team		F														
Women's individual all-around		Q		F												
Women's vault		Q			F											
Women's uneven bars		Q			F											
Women's balance beam		Q				F										
Women's floor		Q				F										
Rhythmic
Women's team															F	
Women's individual all-around															Q	F
Trampoline
Men's individual											Q	F				
Women's individual									Q	F						

== Medalists ==
=== Men's artistic ===
Event	Gold	Silver	Bronze
Team	China; Lan Xingyu; Lin Chaopan; Xiao Ruoteng; Zhang Boheng; Zou Jingyuan	Japan; Shohei Kawakami; Takeru Kitazono; Kakeru Tanigawa; Wataru Tanigawa; Ryota Tsumura	Chinese Taipei; Huang Yen-chang; Lee Chih-kai; Lin Guan-yi; Shiao Yu-jan; Yeh Cheng
Individual all-around	Zhang Boheng; China	Takeru Kitazono; Japan	Lan Xingyu; China
Floor	Kim Han-sol; South Korea	Zhang Boheng; China	Lin Chaopan; China
Pommel horse	Lee Chih-kai; Chinese Taipei	Ryota Tsumura; Japan	Nariman Kurbanov; Kazakhstan
Rings	Lan Xingyu; China	Nguyễn Văn Khánh Phong; Vietnam	Wataru Tanigawa; Japan
Vault	Wataru Tanigawa; Japan	Mehdi Olfati; Iran	Sharul Aimy; Malaysia
Parallel bars	Zou Jingyuan; China	Takeru Kitazono; Japan	Kakeru Tanigawa; Japan
Horizontal bar	Zhang Boheng; China	Lin Chaopan; China	Kakeru Tanigawa; Japan

=== Women's artistic ===
Event	Gold	Silver	Bronze
Team	China; Tang Xijing; Yu Linmin; Zhang Jin; Zhang Xinyi; Zuo Tong	Japan; Misaki Masui; Mana Okamura; Mikako Serita; Kohane Ushioku	North Korea; An Chang-ok; Kim Son-hyang; Kim Su-jong; Ryu Mi-rae; Sim Hae-won
Individual all-around	Zuo Tong; China	Mana Okamura; Japan	Kim Su-jong; North Korea
Vault	An Chang-ok; North Korea	Kim Son-hyang; North Korea	Yu Linmin; China
Uneven bars	An Chang-ok; North Korea	Mikako Serita; Japan	Zuo Tong; China
Balance beam	Mana Okamura; Japan	Tang Xijing; China	Ting Hua-tien; Chinese Taipei
Floor	Zhang Jin; China	Kim Son-hyang; North Korea	Lim Su-min; South Korea

=== Rhythmic ===
Event	Gold	Silver	Bronze
Team	Uzbekistan; Evelina Atalyants; Takhmina Ikromova; Vilana Savadyan	Kazakhstan; Milana Parfilova; Elzhana Taniyeva; Erika Zhailauova	China; Li Huilin; Wang Zilu; Zhao Yating; Zhao Yue
Individual all-around	Takhmina Ikromova; Uzbekistan	Elzhana Taniyeva; Kazakhstan	Milana Parfilova; Kazakhstan

=== Trampoline ===
Event	Gold	Silver	Bronze
Men's individual	Yan Langyu; China	Danil Mussabayev; Kazakhstan	Hiroto Yamada; Japan
Women's individual	Zhu Xueying; China	Hu Yicheng; China	Viktoriya Butolina; Kazakhstan

== Medal table ==
Rank	Nation	Gold	Silver	Bronze	Total
1	China (CHN)	10	4	5	19
2	Japan (JPN)	2	7	4	13
3	North Korea (PRK)	2	2	2	6
4	Uzbekistan (UZB)	2	0	0	2
5	Chinese Taipei (TPE)	1	0	2	3
6	South Korea (KOR)	1	0	1	2
7	Kazakhstan (KAZ)	0	3	3	6
8	Iran (IRI)	0	1	0	1
8	Vietnam (VIE)	0	1	0	1
10	Malaysia (MAS)	0	0	1	1
Totals (10 entries)		18	18	18	54

== Participating nations ==
A total of 154 athletes from 24 nations competed in gymnastics at the 2022 Asian Games:

- Bangladesh (2)
- China (18)
- Chinese Taipei (10)
- Hong Kong (7)
- India (1)
- Iran (4)
- Japan (16)
- Jordan (2)
- Kazakhstan (16)
- Kuwait (1)
- Kyrgyzstan (4)
- Laos (1)
- Malaysia (2)
- Mongolia (4)
- North Korea (8)
- Palestine (1)
- Philippines (6)
- Qatar (1)
- Singapore (9)
- South Korea (13)
- Sri Lanka (1)
- Thailand (11)
- Uzbekistan (10)
- Vietnam (6)
