= Dragon boat at the 2022 Asian Games =

- Venue: Wenzhou Dragon Boat Centre
- Dates: 4–6 October 2023
- Competitors: 293 from 12 nations

Dragon boat at the 2022 Asian Games was held from 4 to 6 October 2023 at Wenzhou Dragon Boat Centre in Wenzhou, China.

== Schedule ==
H	Heats	S	Semifinals	F	Finals

Event↓/Date →	4th Wed			5th Thu			6th Fri		
Men's 200 m	H	S	F						
Men's 500 m				H	S	F			
Men's 1000 m							H	S	F
Women's 200 m	H	S	F						
Women's 500 m				H	S	F			
Women's 1000 m							H	S	F

== Medalists ==
=== Men ===
Event	Gold	Silver	Bronze
200 m	China; Chen Fangjia; Chen Zihuan; Feng Chaochao; Li Chuan; Liu Yu; Lü Luhui; Shu Liang; Sun Jiahao; Wang Liang; Wang Xiaodong; Yang Hailei; Yu Haijie; Zhang Zhicheng; Zheng Jiaxin	Thailand; Sukon Boonem; Kasemsit Borriboonwasin; Chaiyakarn Choochuen; Suradet Faengnoi; Pornprom Kramsuk; Natthapon Kreepkamrai; Suwan Kwanthong; Phatthara Sangdet; Somchai Sangmuang; Chitsanupong Sangpan; Nopphadol Sangthuang; Vinya Seechomchuen; Pornchai Tesdee; Phakdee Wannamanee	Indonesia; Joko Andriyanto; Muh Burhan; Tri Wahyu Buwono; Yuda Firmansyah; Mugi Harjito; Harjuna; Andri Agus Mulyana; Angga Suwandi Putra; Maizir Riyondra; Dedi Saputra; Indra Tri Setiawan; Sofiyanto; Sutrisno; Zubakri
500 m	China; Chen Fangjia; Chen Zihuan; Feng Chaochao; Li Chuan; Liu Yu; Lü Luhui; Shu Liang; Sun Jiahao; Wang Liang; Wang Xiaodong; Yang Hailei; Yu Haijie; Zhang Zhicheng; Zheng Jiaxin	Indonesia; Joko Andriyanto; Muh Burhan; Tri Wahyu Buwono; Yuda Firmansyah; Mugi Harjito; Harjuna; Andri Agus Mulyana; Angga Suwandi Putra; Maizir Riyondra; Dedi Saputra; Indra Tri Setiawan; Sofiyanto; Sutrisno; Zubakri	Thailand; Sukon Boonem; Kasemsit Borriboonwasin; Chaiyakarn Choochuen; Suradet Faengnoi; Pornprom Kramsuk; Natthapon Kreepkamrai; Suwan Kwanthong; Phatthara Sangdet; Somchai Sangmuang; Chitsanupong Sangpan; Nopphadol Sangthuang; Vinya Seechomchuen; Pornchai Tesdee; Phakdee Wannamanee
1000 m	Indonesia; Joko Andriyanto; Muh Burhan; Tri Wahyu Buwono; Yuda Firmansyah; Mugi Harjito; Harjuna; Andri Agus Mulyana; Angga Suwandi Putra; Maizir Riyondra; Dedi Saputra; Indra Tri Setiawan; Sofiyanto; Sutrisno; Zubakri	China; Chen Fangjia; Chen Zihuan; Feng Chaochao; Li Chuan; Liu Yu; Lü Luhui; Shu Liang; Sun Jiahao; Wang Liang; Wang Xiaodong; Yang Hailei; Yu Haijie; Zhang Zhicheng; Zheng Jiaxin	Myanmar; Hein Soe; Htoo Htoo Aung; Myint Ko Ko; Myo Hlaing Win; Naing Lin Oo; Pyae Phyo Thant; Pyae Sone Aung; Saw Kaung Kaung San; Saw Moe Aung; Saw Niang Lin Kyaw; Thant Zin Oo; Tin Ko Ko; Yu Ya Maung; Zaw Zaw Tun

=== Women ===
Event	Gold	Silver	Bronze
200 m	China; Cheng Lingzhi; Ding Sijie; Fan Yiting; Li Shuqi; Li Zhixian; Luo Meng; Shi Yingying; Sun Yang; Wang Ji; Wang Li; Wang Ying; Xue Lina; Yu Shimeng; Zhu Xiaoli	Indonesia; Ramla Baharuddin; Ester Yustince Daimoi; Iin Rosiana Damiri; Dayumin; Raudani Fitra; Nadia Hafiza; Maryati; Sella Monim; Cinta Priendtisca Nayomi; Fazriah Nurbayan; Ratih; Ayuning Tika Vihari; Reski Wahyuni; Anisa Yulistiawan	Thailand; Jaruwan Chaikan; Ketkanok Chomchey; Jirawan Hankhamla; Praewpan Kawsri; Watcharaporn Khadtiya; Pranchalee Moonkasem; Patthama Nanthain; Nipaporn Nopsri; Arisara Pantulap; Sukanya Poradok; Anuthida Saeheng; Thitima Sukrat; Onuma Teeranaew; Benjamas Woranuch
500 m	China; Cheng Lingzhi; Ding Sijie; Fan Yiting; Li Shuqi; Li Zhixian; Luo Meng; Shi Yingying; Sun Yang; Wang Ji; Wang Li; Wang Ying; Xue Lina; Yu Shimeng; Zhu Xiaoli	Indonesia; Ramla Baharuddin; Ester Yustince Daimoi; Iin Rosiana Damiri; Dayumin; Raudani Fitra; Nadia Hafiza; Maryati; Sella Monim; Cinta Priendtisca Nayomi; Fazriah Nurbayan; Ratih; Ayuning Tika Vihari; Reski Wahyuni; Anisa Yulistiawan	Myanmar; Hla Hla Htwe; Khin Su Su Aung; Lin Lin Kyaw; Man Huai Phawng; Moe Ma Ma; Myint Myint Soe; Phyu Phyu Aung; San San Moe; Saw Myat Thu; Soe Sandar; Soe Soe Kyaw; Su Wai Phyo; Thet Phyo Naing; Win Win Htwe
1000 m	China; Cheng Lingzhi; Ding Sijie; Fan Yiting; Li Shuqi; Li Zhixian; Luo Meng; Shi Yingying; Sun Yang; Wang Ji; Wang Li; Wang Ying; Xue Lina; Yu Shimeng; Zhu Xiaoli	Indonesia; Ramla Baharuddin; Ester Yustince Daimoi; Iin Rosiana Damiri; Dayumin; Raudani Fitra; Nadia Hafiza; Maryati; Sella Monim; Cinta Priendtisca Nayomi; Fazriah Nurbayan; Ratih; Ayuning Tika Vihari; Reski Wahyuni; Anisa Yulistiawan	South Korea; Byun Eun-jeong; Cha Tae-hee; Cho Soo-bin; Han Sol-hee; Jeong Ji-won; Ju Hee; Ju Yun-woo; Kim Da-bin; Kim Hyeon-hee; Kim Yeo-jin; Lee Hyeon-joo; Lim Sung-hwa; Tak Su-jin; Yun Ye-bom

== Medal table ==
Rank	Nation	Gold	Silver	Bronze	Total
1	China (CHN)	5	1	0	6
2	Indonesia (INA)	1	4	1	6
3	Thailand (THA)	0	1	2	3
4	Myanmar (MYA)	0	0	2	2
5	South Korea (KOR)	0	0	1	1
Totals (5 entries)		6	6	6	18

== Participating nations ==
A total of 293 athletes from 12 nations competed in dragon boat at the 2022 Asian Games:

- Cambodia (14)
- China (28)
- Chinese Taipei (14)
- Hong Kong (28)
- Indonesia (28)
- Macau (28)
- Malaysia (14)
- Myanmar (28)
- North Korea (28)
- Singapore (27)
- South Korea (28)
- Thailand (28)
