= Gymnastics at the 2022 Asian Games – Men's parallel bars =

Men's parallel bars at the 2022 Asian Games
- Venue: Huanglong Gymnasium
- Date: 24–29 September 2023
- Competitors: 40 from 12 nations

Medalists
gold medal	Zou Jingyuan	China
silver medal	Takeru Kitazono	Japan
bronze medal	Kakeru Tanigawa	Japan

The men's parallel bars competition at the 2022 Asian Games took place on 24 and 29 September 2023 at Huanglong Sports Centre Gymnasium.

== Schedule ==
All times are China Standard Time (UTC+08:00)

Date	Time	Event
Sunday, 24 September 2023	10:00	Qualification
Friday, 29 September 2023	15:42	Final

== Results ==
Legend

- DNS — Did not start

=== Qualification ===
Rank	Athlete	Score
1	Zou Jingyuan (CHN)	15.933
2	Zhang Boheng (CHN)	15.466
3	Takeru Kitazono (JPN)	15.133
4	Kakeru Tanigawa (JPN)	14.900
5	Wataru Tanigawa (JPN)	14.866
6	Lin Chaopan (CHN)	14.833
7	Shohei Kawakami (JPN)	14.533
8	Ri Wi-chol (PRK)	14.433
9	Bae Ga-ram (KOR)	14.133
10	Yun Jin-seong (KOR)	14.133
11	Lan Xingyu (CHN)	14.000
12	Jeon Yo-seop (KOR)	13.800
13	Kim Han-sol (KOR)	13.766
14	Lee Chih-kai (TPE)	13.733
15	Huang Yen-chang (TPE)	13.566
16	Lê Thanh Tùng (VIE)	13.566
17	Mohammad Reza Khosronejad (IRI)	13.466
18	Roman Mamenov (KAZ)	13.433
19	Pak Song-hyok (PRK)	13.366
20	Akhrorkhon Temirkhonov (UZB)	13.333
21	Phạm Phước Hiếu (VIE)	12.966
22	Mohammad Reza Hamidi (IRI)	12.933
23	Emil Akhmejanov (KAZ)	12.933
24	Asadbek Azamov (UZB)	12.866
25	Ravshan Kamiljanov (UZB)	12.800
26	Nadila Nethviru (SRI)	12.800
27	Yeh Cheng (TPE)	12.500
28	Rustambek Nematov (UZB)	12.333
29	Weerapat Chuaisom (THA)	12.300
30	Assan Salimov (KAZ)	12.266
31	Suphacheep Baobenmad (THA)	12.266
32	Alisher Toibazarov (KAZ)	11.933
33	Witsawayot Saroj (THA)	11.700
34	Ittirit Kumsiriratn (THA)	11.466
35	Lin Guan-yi (TPE)	10.800
36	Trịnh Hải Khang (VIE)	10.533
37	Jong Ryong-il (PRK)	7.200
—	Sangkheong Khumi (BAN)	DNS
—	Mehdi Ahmadkohani (IRI)	DNS
—	Mehdi Olfati (IRI)	DNS

=== Final ===
Rank	Athlete	Score
1st place, gold medalist(s)	Zou Jingyuan (CHN)	15.933
2nd place, silver medalist(s)	Takeru Kitazono (JPN)	15.233
3rd place, bronze medalist(s)	Kakeru Tanigawa (JPN)	15.066
4	Zhang Boheng (CHN)	14.100
5	Yun Jin-seong (KOR)	13.333
6	Huang Yen-chang (TPE)	13.300
7	Bae Ga-ram (KOR)	12.966
8	Ri Wi-chol (PRK)	11.800
