= Gymnastics at the 2022 Asian Games – Men's pommel horse =

Men's pommel horse at the 2022 Asian Games
- Venue: Huanglong Gymnasium
- Date: 24–28 September 2023
- Competitors: 43 from 14 nations

Medalists
gold medal	Lee Chih-kai	Chinese Taipei
silver medal	Ryota Tsumura	Japan
bronze medal	Nariman Kurbanov	Kazakhstan

The men's pommel horse competition at the 2022 Asian Games took place on 24 and 28 September 2023 at the Huanglong Sports Centre Gymnasium.

== Schedule ==
All times are China Standard Time (UTC+08:00)

Date	Time	Event
Sunday, 24 September 2023	10:00	Qualification
Thursday, 28 September 2023	15:42	Final

== Results ==
Legend

- DNS — Did not start

=== Qualification ===
Rank	Athlete	Score
1	Lee Chih-kai (TPE)	15.066
2	Shiao Yu-jan (TPE)	15.000
3	Ryota Tsumura (JPN)	14.900
4	Nariman Kurbanov (KAZ)	14.566
5	Xiao Ruoteng (CHN)	14.466
6	Zhang Boheng (CHN)	14.333
7	Đặng Ngọc Xuân Thiện (VIE)	14.233
8	Jeon Yo-seop (KOR)	14.033
9	Shohei Kawakami (JPN)	14.000
10	Huang Yen-chang (TPE)	13.933
11	Ravshan Kamiljanov (UZB)	13.633
12	Bae Ga-ram (KOR)	13.400
13	Lin Chaopan (CHN)	13.266
13	Yeh Cheng (TPE)	13.266
15	Takeru Kitazono (JPN)	13.266
16	Yun Jin-seong (KOR)	13.200
17	Kim Han-sol (KOR)	12.800
18	Ahmad Abu Al-Soud (JOR)	12.766
19	Akhrorkhon Temirkhonov (UZB)	12.700
20	Roman Mamenov (KAZ)	12.400
21	Mohammad Reza Hamidi (IRI)	12.333
22	Pak Song-hyok (PRK)	12.333
23	Rakan Al-Harith (QAT)	12.200
24	Kakeru Tanigawa (JPN)	12.166
25	Lan Xingyu (CHN)	12.000
26	Alisher Toibazarov (KAZ)	11.766
27	Khumoyun Islomov (UZB)	11.500
28	Emil Akhmejanov (KAZ)	11.433
29	Mohammad Reza Khosronejad (IRI)	11.066
30	Ri Wi-chol (PRK)	10.366
31	Nadila Nethviru (SRI)	10.266
32	Weerapat Chuaisom (THA)	10.033
33	Suphacheep Baobenmad (THA)	10.000
34	Ittirit Kumsiriratn (THA)	9.600
35	Sangkheong Khumi (BAN)	9.566
36	Phạm Phước Hiếu (VIE)	7.600
37	Asadbek Azamov (UZB)	6.066
38	Trịnh Hải Khang (VIE)	5.500
39	Abu Saeed Rafi (BAN)	4.600
40	Witsawayot Saroj (THA)	3.500
—	Mehdi Ahmadkohani (IRI)	DNS
—	Mehdi Olfati (IRI)	DNS
—	Jong Ryong-il (PRK)	DNS

=== Final ===
Rank	Athlete	Score
1st place, gold medalist(s)	Lee Chih-kai (TPE)	15.500
2nd place, silver medalist(s)	Ryota Tsumura (JPN)	15.166
3rd place, bronze medalist(s)	Nariman Kurbanov (KAZ)	15.100
4	Shiao Yu-jan (TPE)	15.066
5	Đặng Ngọc Xuân Thiện (VIE)	14.766
6	Jeon Yo-seop (KOR)	12.866
7	Xiao Ruoteng (CHN)	12.600
8	Zhang Boheng (CHN)	11.733
