= Gymnastics at the 2022 Asian Games – Men's floor =

Men's floor at the 2022 Asian Games
- Venue: Huanglong Gymnasium
- Date: 24–28 September 2023
- Competitors: 40 from 13 nations

Medalists
gold medal	Kim Han-sol	South Korea
silver medal	Zhang Boheng	China
bronze medal	Lin Chaopan	China

The men's floor competition at the 2022 Asian Games took place on 24 and 28 September 2023 at Huanglong Sports Centre Gymnasium.

== Schedule ==
All times are China Standard Time (UTC+08:00)

Date	Time	Event
Sunday, 24 September 2023	10:00	Qualification
Thursday, 28 September 2023	14:30	Final

== Results ==
Legend

- DNS — Did not start

=== Qualification ===
Rank	Athlete	Score
1	Zhang Boheng (CHN)	14.933
2	Shohei Kawakami (JPN)	14.466
3	Kim Han-sol (KOR)	14.433
4	Tikumporn Surintornta (THA)	14.400
5	Wataru Tanigawa (JPN)	14.133
6	Kakeru Tanigawa (JPN)	14.033
7	Trịnh Hải Khang (VIE)	13.966
8	Lin Chaopan (CHN)	13.966
9	Khumoyun Islomov (UZB)	13.900
10	Takeru Kitazono (JPN)	13.800
11	Huang Yen-chang (TPE)	13.533
12	Yun Jin-seong (KOR)	13.533
12	Lin Guan-yi (TPE)	13.533
14	Shin Jea-hwan (KOR)	13.500
15	Ravshan Kamiljanov (UZB)	13.466
16	Yeh Cheng (TPE)	13.466
17	Assan Salimov (KAZ)	13.300
18	Asadbek Azamov (UZB)	13.266
19	Xiao Ruoteng (CHN)	13.266
20	Mohammad Reza Khosronejad (IRI)	13.233
21	Mohammad Reza Hamidi (IRI)	13.033
22	Alisher Toibazarov (KAZ)	13.000
23	Justine Ace De Leon (PHI)	13.000
24	Ittirit Kumsiriratn (THA)	12.700
25	Rustambek Nematov (UZB)	12.666
26	Lan Xingyu (CHN)	12.433
27	Ri Wi-chol (PRK)	12.400
28	Bae Ga-ram (KOR)	12.233
29	Terry Tay (SGP)	12.066
30	Nguyễn Văn Khánh Phong (VIE)	11.933
31	Nadila Nethviru (SRI)	11.866
32	Suphacheep Baobenmad (THA)	11.600
33	Phạm Phước Hiếu (VIE)	11.566
34	Roman Mamenov (KAZ)	11.433
35	Witsawayot Saroj (THA)	11.400
36	Pak Song-hyok (PRK)	11.333
37	Jong Ryong-il (PRK)	2.233
38	Emil Akhmejanov (KAZ)	2.100
—	Mehdi Ahmadkohani (IRI)	DNS
—	Mehdi Olfati (IRI)	DNS

=== Final ===
Rank	Athlete	Score
1st place, gold medalist(s)	Kim Han-sol (KOR)	14.900
2nd place, silver medalist(s)	Zhang Boheng (CHN)	14.333
3rd place, bronze medalist(s)	Lin Chaopan (CHN)	14.333
4	Khumoyun Islomov (UZB)	14.133
5	Tikumporn Surintornta (THA)	13.966
6	Trịnh Hải Khang (VIE)	13.800
7	Wataru Tanigawa (JPN)	13.200
8	Shohei Kawakami (JPN)	12.400
