= Gymnastics at the 2022 Asian Games – Men's horizontal bar =

Men's horizontal bar at the 2022 Asian Games
- Venue: Huanglong Gymnasium
- Date: 24–29 September 2023
- Competitors: 39 from 11 nations

Medalists
gold medal	Zhang Boheng	China
silver medal	Lin Chaopan	China
bronze medal	Kakeru Tanigawa	Japan

The men's horizontal bar competition at the 2022 Asian Games took place on 24 and 29 September 2023 at Huanglong Sports Centre Gymnasium.

== Schedule ==
All times are China Standard Time (UTC+08:00)

Date	Time	Event
Sunday, 24 September 2023	10:00	Qualification
Friday, 29 September 2023	16:54	Final

== Results ==
Legend

- DNS — Did not start

=== Qualification ===
Rank	Athlete	Score
1	Kakeru Tanigawa (JPN)	14.533
2	Lin Chaopan (CHN)	14.466
3	Xiao Ruoteng (CHN)	14.266
4	Zhang Boheng (CHN)	14.266
5	Wataru Tanigawa (JPN)	14.233
6	Shohei Kawakami (JPN)	14.233
7	Bae Ga-ram (KOR)	13.400
8	Lan Xingyu (CHN)	13.366
9	Yun Jin-seong (KOR)	13.300
10	Huang Yen-chang (TPE)	13.233
11	Jeon Yo-seop (KOR)	12.800
12	Takeru Kitazono (JPN)	12.766
13	Lê Thanh Tùng (VIE)	12.733
14	Mohammad Reza Hamidi (IRI)	12.666
15	Emil Akhmejanov (KAZ)	12.600
16	Weerapat Chuaisom (THA)	12.466
17	Lee Chih-kai (TPE)	12.433
18	Ri Wi-chol (PRK)	12.366
19	Rustambek Nematov (UZB)	12.300
20	Asadbek Azamov (UZB)	12.266
21	Mohammad Reza Khosronejad (IRI)	12.200
22	Ravshan Kamiljanov (UZB)	12.133
23	Phạm Phước Hiếu (VIE)	12.000
24	Yeh Cheng (TPE)	11.933
25	Roman Mamenov (KAZ)	11.833
26	Suphacheep Baobenmad (THA)	11.766
27	Lin Guan-yi (TPE)	11.666
28	Alisher Toibazarov (KAZ)	11.266
29	Assan Salimov (KAZ)	11.266
30	Akhrorkhon Temirkhonov (UZB)	11.233
31	Pak Song-hyok (PRK)	10.833
32	Nadila Nethviru (SRI)	10.733
33	Witsawayot Saroj (THA)	10.466
34	Nguyễn Văn Khánh Phong (VIE)	8.466
35	Jong Ryong-il (PRK)	7.600
36	Ittirit Kumsiriratn (THA)	7.366
—	Mehdi Ahmadkohani (IRI)	DNS
—	Mehdi Olfati (IRI)	DNS
—	Kim Han-sol (KOR)	DNS

=== Final ===
Rank	Athlete	Score
1st place, gold medalist(s)	Zhang Boheng (CHN)	15.100
2nd place, silver medalist(s)	Lin Chaopan (CHN)	14.800
3rd place, bronze medalist(s)	Kakeru Tanigawa (JPN)	14.633
4	Wataru Tanigawa (JPN)	14.366
5	Huang Yen-chang (TPE)	13.300
6	Bae Ga-ram (KOR)	13.266
7	Lê Thanh Tùng (VIE)	13.166
8	Yun Jin-seong (KOR)	12.266
