= Gymnastics at the 2022 Asian Games – Men's rings =

Men's rings at the 2022 Asian Games
- Venue: Huanglong Gymnasium
- Date: 24–28 September 2023
- Competitors: 41 from 13 nations

Medalists
gold medal	Lan Xingyu	China
silver medal	Nguyễn Văn Khánh Phong	Vietnam
bronze medal	Wataru Tanigawa	Japan

The men's rings competition at the 2022 Asian Games took place on 24 and 28 September 2023 at Huanglong Sports Centre Gymnasium.

== Schedule ==
All times are China Standard Time (UTC+08:00)

Date	Time	Event
Sunday, 24 September 2023	10:00	Qualification
Thursday, 28 September 2023	16:54	Final

== Results ==
Legend

- DNS — Did not start

=== Qualification ===
Rank	Athlete	Score
1	Lan Xingyu (CHN)	14.966
2	Zou Jingyuan (CHN)	14.800
3	Zhang Boheng (CHN)	14.700
4	Nguyễn Văn Khánh Phong (VIE)	14.566
5	Lin Guan-yi (TPE)	14.466
6	Wataru Tanigawa (JPN)	14.433
7	Jong Ryong-il (PRK)	14.433
8	Ng Kiu Chung (HKG)	14.033
9	Takeru Kitazono (JPN)	13.666
10	Pak Song-hyok (PRK)	13.500
11	Ryota Tsumura (JPN)	13.400
12	Mehdi Ahmadkohani (IRI)	13.400
13	Akhrorkhon Temirkhonov (UZB)	13.366
14	Asadbek Azamov (UZB)	13.166
15	Yun Jin-seong (KOR)	13.133
16	Shohei Kawakami (JPN)	13.100
17	Lee Chih-kai (TPE)	13.066
18	Mohammad Reza Khosronejad (IRI)	12.933
19	Yeh Cheng (TPE)	12.900
20	Tikumporn Surintornta (THA)	12.800
21	Jeon Yo-seop (KOR)	12.766
22	Ri Wi-chol (PRK)	12.600
23	Shiao Yu-jan (TPE)	12.500
24	Lê Thanh Tùng (VIE)	12.466
25	Bae Ga-ram (KOR)	12.466
26	Roman Mamenov (KAZ)	12.433
27	Emil Akhmejanov (KAZ)	12.200
28	Alisher Toibazarov (KAZ)	12.166
29	Suphacheep Baobenmad (THA)	11.766
30	Rustambek Nematov (UZB)	11.700
31	Witsawayot Saroj (THA)	11.700
32	Ittirit Kumsiriratn (THA)	11.666
33	Mohammad Reza Hamidi (IRI)	11.100
34	Ravshan Kamiljanov (UZB)	11.033
35	Nadila Nethviru (SRI)	10.866
36	Assan Salimov (KAZ)	10.633
37	Sangkheong Khumi (BAN)	9.400
38	Phạm Phước Hiếu (VIE)	9.166
—	Xiao Ruoteng (CHN)	DNS
—	Mehdi Olfati (IRI)	DNS
—	Kim Han-sol (KOR)	DNS

=== Final ===
Rank	Athlete	Score
1st place, gold medalist(s)	Lan Xingyu (CHN)	15.433
2nd place, silver medalist(s)	Nguyễn Văn Khánh Phong (VIE)	14.600
3rd place, bronze medalist(s)	Wataru Tanigawa (JPN)	14.300
4	Jong Ryong-il (PRK)	14.300
5	Lin Guan-yi (TPE)	14.266
6	Zou Jingyuan (CHN)	14.200
7	Takeru Kitazono (JPN)	14.000
8	Ng Kiu Chung (HKG)	13.966
