= Esports at the 2022 Asian Games – Dream Three Kingdoms 2 =

Dream Three Kingdoms 2 at the 2022 Asian Games
- Venue: Hangzhou Esports Center
- Date: 27–30 September 2023
- Competitors: 59 from 11 nations

Medalists
gold medal	China; Cheng Long, Cheng Hu, Fu Haojie, Yao Xing, Zhou Ke, Guo Runmin
silver medal	Hong Kong; Law Hing Lung, Chan Cheuk Kit, Yip Ho Lam, Yuen Pak Lam, Yip Wai Lam
bronze medal	Thailand; Chatchapon Chanthorn, Werit Popan, Pachara Thongeiam, Walunchai Sukarin, Teerapat Supasdetch, Attakit Samattakitwanich

The Dream Three Kingdoms 2 event at the 2022 Asian Games took place from 27 to 30 September 2023 in Hangzhou, China.

Dream Three Kingdoms 2 (Chinese: 梦三国2), a 3D multiplayer online battle arena game developed by Hangzhou Electronic Soul Network Technology.

== Schedule ==
All times are China Standard Time (UTC+08:00)

Date	Time	Event
Wednesday, 27 September 2023	09:00	Group round
Thursday, 28 September 2023	09:00	Quarterfinals
Friday, 29 September 2023	09:00	Semifinals
Saturday, 30 September 2023	14:00	Bronze medal match
Saturday, 30 September 2023	19:00	Final

== Seeding ==
A qualification tournament called AESF Road to Asian Games 2022 was played in Hangzhou, China from 24 to 25 July 2023. The results of this tournament were used to determine the seedings for the Games.

Group 1	Group 2
China (3–0)	Thailand (2–0)
Hong Kong (2–1)	Vietnam (1–1)
Kazakhstan (1–2)	Philippines (0–2)
Nepal (0–3)	

China and Thailand qualified directly to the quarterfinal stage.

== Squads ==
China	Hong Kong	Kazakhstan	Kyrgyzstan
Cheng Long; Cheng Hu; Fu Haojie; Yao Xing; Zhou Ke; Guo Runmin	Law Hing Lung; Chan Cheuk Kit; Yip Ho Lam; Yuen Pak Lam; Yip Wai Lam	Nurlan Karybayev; Alisher Mukiyev; Meirlan Yermakhanov; Alimzhan Kokishev; Aizhan Tazhibayeva	Daniil Krivosheev; Adis Azamatov; Argen Abykeev; Asadbek Sadikov; Beklar Ruslan
Laos	Nepal	Philippines	Tajikistan
Vannaxay Vongxaty; Thepthila Souliyakhamphai; Vithaya Leuangvihane; Tabee Vorlasin; Maliphone Phrakhine	Arun Mishra; Legal Sangbo Limbu; Bishesh Paudel; Saujanya Shrestha; Sumin Shrestha	Karl To; Caisam Nopueto; Manjean Faldas; Neil De Guzman; Shin Boo Ponferrada; Mark Adrian Jison	Aziz Akhmedov; Ali Azizov; Sharifi Behruzi; Aminjon Haidarov; Ramziyor Khorkashov; Karimjon Mukhtorov
Thailand	Uzbekistan	Vietnam	
Chatchapon Chanthorn; Werit Popan; Pachara Thongeiam; Walunchai Sukarin; Teerapat Supasdetch; Attakit Samattakitwanich	Sardor Azimov; Vadim Klimenkov; Malika Mirabdullaeva; Nurmukhammad Nematov; Yaroslav Koltunov	Bùi Minh Quân; Đỗ Thành Đạt; Lê Quang Huy; Nguyễn Chí Khanh; Phạm Quốc Thắng	

== Results ==
=== Group round ===
==== Group A ====
Pos	Team	Pld	W	L	Pts	Qualification
1	Laos	2	2	0	2	Quarterfinals
2	Hong Kong	2	1	1	1	Quarterfinals
3	Tajikistan	2	0	2	0	

Source: OCA

	Score	
Laos	1–0	Hong Kong
Laos	1–0	Tajikistan
Hong Kong	1–0	Tajikistan

==== Group B ====
Pos	Team	Pld	W	L	Pts	Qualification
1	Kazakhstan	2	2	0	2	Quarterfinals
2	Philippines	2	1	1	1	Quarterfinals
3	Uzbekistan	2	0	2	0	

Source: OCA

	Score	
Philippines	1–0	Uzbekistan
Philippines	0–1	Kazakhstan
Uzbekistan	0–1	Kazakhstan

==== Group C ====
Pos	Team	Pld	W	L	Pts	Qualification
1	Vietnam	2	2	0	2	Quarterfinals
2	Kyrgyzstan	2	1	1	1	Quarterfinals
3	Nepal	2	0	2	0	

Source: OCA

	Score	
Kyrgyzstan	0–1	Vietnam
Kyrgyzstan	1–0	Nepal
Vietnam	1–0	Nepal

=== Knockout round ===
Quarterfinals
China	2
Laos	0
Kyrgyzstan	0
Vietnam	2
Hong Kong	2
Philippines	0
Kyrgyzstan	0
Thailand	2

Semifinals
China	2
Vietnam	0
Hong Kong	2
Thailand	0

Final
China	2
Hong Kong	0
Bronze medal match
Vietnam	0
Thailand	2
