= Diving at the 2022 Asian Games – Men's 1 metre springboard =

Diving competition

Men's 1 metre springboard at the 2022 Asian Games
- Venue: Hangzhou Olympic Expo Aquatics Center
- Date: 2 October 2023
- Competitors: 15 from 11 nations

Medalists
gold medal	Wang Zongyuan	China
silver medal	Peng Jianfeng	China
bronze medal	Woo Ha-ram	South Korea

The men's 1 metre springboard competition at the 2022 Asian Games took place on 2 October 2023 at Hangzhou Olympic Expo Center.

== Schedule ==
All times are China Standard Time (UTC+08:00)

Date	Time	Event
Monday, 2 October 2023	19:00	Final

== Results ==
Legend

- DNS — Did not start

Rank	Athlete	Dive						Total
Rank	Athlete	1	2	3	4	5	6	Total
1st place, gold medalist(s)	Wang Zongyuan (CHN)	79.50	69.00	76.80	83.30	69.30	81.60	459.50
2nd place, silver medalist(s)	Peng Jianfeng (CHN)	72.00	66.00	76.50	86.70	67.65	73.60	442.45
3rd place, bronze medalist(s)	Woo Ha-ram (KOR)	63.00	66.30	74.25	57.60	68.80	66.00	395.95
4	Kim Yeong-taek (KOR)	70.95	64.00	58.50	65.60	49.50	34.00	342.55
5	Chawanwat Juntaphadawon (THA)	54.60	46.50	56.10	43.20	57.00	54.00	311.40
6	Hanis Nazirul Jaya Surya (MAS)	55.80	54.00	31.05	57.00	53.30	45.00	296.15
7	Avvir Tham (SGP)	62.40	35.65	57.35	4.50	59.20	67.65	286.75
8	Vyacheslav Kachanov (UZB)	54.25	21.75	53.30	41.25	43.20	51.00	264.75
9	Yuen Pak Yin (HKG)	46.80	50.70	43.40	41.60	45.00	23.00	250.50
10	Nazar Kozhanov (KAZ)	22.50	57.35	33.35	46.50	36.40	44.20	240.30
11	Mohammad Moghaddasi (IRI)	49.20	52.70	42.00	0.00	49.40	37.50	230.80
12	London Singh Hemam (IND)	34.10	48.10	17.60	27.00	39.00	42.00	207.80
13	Thitiwut Phoemphun (THA)	43.20	42.90	40.00	23.00	26.40	28.60	204.10
14	He Heung Wing (MAC)	36.00	39.00	30.80	38.75	15.00	25.50	185.05
—	Enrique Maccartney Harold (MAS)							DNS
