= Gymnastics at the 2022 Asian Games – Women's floor =

Women's floor at the 2022 Asian Games
- Venue: Huanglong Gymnasium
- Date: 25–29 September 2023
- Competitors: 35 from 11 nations

Medalists
gold medal	Zhang Jin	China
silver medal	Kim Son-hyang	North Korea
bronze medal	Lim Su-min	South Korea

The women's floor competition at the 2022 Asian Games took place on 25 and 29 September 2023 at Huanglong Sports Centre Gymnasium.

== Schedule ==
All times are China Standard Time (UTC+08:00)

Date	Time	Event
Monday, 25 September 2023	10:00	Qualification
Friday, 29 September 2023	16:18	Final

== Results ==
=== Qualification ===
Rank	Athlete	Score
1	Kohane Ushioku (JPN)	13.266
2	Zhang Jin (CHN)	13.233
3	Zhang Xinyi (CHN)	13.200
4	Zuo Tong (CHN)	13.166
5	Mana Okamura (JPN)	13.133
6	Kim Su-jong (PRK)	13.100
7	Lim Su-min (KOR)	13.033
8	Darya Yassinskaya (KAZ)	13.000
9	Tang Xijing (CHN)	12.933
10	Kim Son-hyang (PRK)	12.933
11	Misaki Masui (JPN)	12.700
12	An Chang-ok (PRK)	12.566
13	Ting Hua-tien (TPE)	12.500
14	Sasiwimon Mueangphuan (THA)	12.466
15	An Yeon-jeong (KOR)	12.400
16	Aida Bauyrzhanova (KAZ)	12.266
17	Emma Yap (SGP)	12.233
18	Wu Sing-fen (TPE)	12.000
19	Oh So-seon (KOR)	11.900
20	Lai Pin-ju (TPE)	11.866
21	Anfissa Ivanova (KAZ)	11.866
22	Amina Khalimarden (KAZ)	11.833
23	Lin Yi-chen (TPE)	11.800
24	Charlie Manzano (PHI)	11.700
25	Phạm Như Phương (VIE)	11.633
26	Ananya Patanakul (THA)	11.466
27	Kaitlyn Lim (SGP)	11.366
28	Kursten Lopez (PHI)	11.366
29	Shandy Poh (SGP)	11.100
30	Mikako Serita (JPN)	10.966
31	Yun Bo-eun (KOR)	10.933
32	Nadine Joy Nathan (SGP)	10.433
33	Thantida Ruecker (THA)	10.400
34	Sim Hae-win (PRK)	10.100
35	Pranati Nayak (IND)	9.833

=== Final ===
Rank	Athlete	Score
1st place, gold medalist(s)	Zhang Jin (CHN)	13.100
2nd place, silver medalist(s)	Kim Son-hyang (PRK)	12.966
3rd place, bronze medalist(s)	Lim Su-min (KOR)	12.800
4	Mana Okamura (JPN)	12.700
5	Misaki Masui (JPN)	12.633
6	Kim Su-jong (PRK)	12.533
7	Darya Yassinskaya (KAZ)	12.266
8	Zhang Xinyi (CHN)	11.733
