= Dragon boat at the 2022 Asian Games – Men's 500 metres =

Men's 500 metres at the 2022 Asian Games
- Venue: Wenzhou Dragon Boat Centre
- Date: 5 October 2023
- Competitors: 167 from 12 nations

Medalists
gold medal	China
silver medal	Indonesia
bronze medal	Thailand

The men's dragon boat 500 metres competition at the 2022 Asian Games was held on 5 October 2023.

== Schedule ==
All times are China Standard Time (UTC+08:00)

Date	Time	Event
Thursday, 5 October 2023	09:00	Heats
Thursday, 5 October 2023	09:47	Semifinals
Thursday, 5 October 2023	10:34	Finals

== Squads ==
Cambodia	China	Chinese Taipei	Hong Kong
Cheat Nisith; Horl Dale; La Soknim; Leng Sothea; Ly Mouslim; Ly Torhieth; Meas Sam Oun; Meas Sinat; Ok Mathel; San Makara; Sin Visal; Sothea Lyhieng; Vorn Phanet; Vutha Ratana	Chen Fangjia; Chen Zihuan; Feng Chaochao; Li Chuan; Liu Yu; Lü Luhui; Shu Liang; Sun Jiahao; Wang Liang; Wang Xiaodong; Yang Hailei; Yu Haijie; Zhang Zhicheng; Zheng Jiaxin	Chen Rui-huang; Chen Tsung; Chen Tzu-hsien; Chien Cheng-yen; Chou Chih-wei; Chou En-ping; Hsieh Chang-yi; Lin Min-hao; Lin Sheng-ru; Lu En; Tseng Hsiang-hsuan; Tuan Yen-yu; Wu Chen-po; Wu Chun-chieh	Ho Pui Lun; Huen Kui Chun; Hung Tsz Hin; Keung Tsz Lok; Ko Kit Wang; Lam Ho Tsun; Lau Chin Ho; Justin Lau; Lee Kin Ho; Li Cai; Mak Tik Weng; Sim Shing Ho; Tang Ho Chung; Wong Ka Ho
Indonesia	Macau	Malaysia	Myanmar
Joko Andriyanto; Muh Burhan; Tri Wahyu Buwono; Yuda Firmansyah; Mugi Harjito; Harjuna; Andri Agus Mulyana; Angga Suwandi Putra; Maizir Riyondra; Dedi Saputra; Indra Tri Setiawan; Sofiyanto; Sutrisno; Zubakri	Chan Chi Hang; Chan Ka Meng; Cheang Ka Lok; Fong Chi Long; Ho Seong U; Ho Song Hei; Ieong Meng Ut; Lam Chon Wong; Lam Wa Heng; Lei Man U; Loi Chi On; Lok Weng Long; Sou Pak Hou; Wu Pou Fai	Ridzuan Abdul Aziz; Nur Rahman Abdullah; Adib Kamaruzrizan; Ahmad Azfaruddin Lukman; Montoya Raw Michael; Nazrin Najib; Nik Afiq Nik Mazli; Ahmad Ariff Rasydan; Bahij Rabbani Rizal; Mirza Adli Shaharaziz; Shahrin Haziq Shahbireen; Khairul Naim Zainal; Ahmad Amir Khan Zainalabadin; Aiman Zamberi	Hein Soe; Htoo Htoo Aung; Myint Ko Ko; Myo Hlaing Win; Naing Lin Oo; Pyae Phyo Thant; Pyae Sone Aung; Saw Kaung Kaung San; Saw Moe Aung; Saw Niang Lin Kyaw; Thant Zin Oo; Tin Ko Ko; Yu Ya Maung; Zaw Zaw Tun
North Korea	Singapore	South Korea	Thailand
Choe Kwang-ryong; Ho Jin-bom; Hwang Chol-song; Jon Chung-hyok; Kim Chol-hyok; Kim Jin-il; Kim Kyong-guk; Kim Sok-chol; O In-guk; Ri Hun; Ri Yong-hyok; Yang Chol-jin; Yun Kyong-il; Yun Yong-ho	Chai Bing Liang; Ch'ng Khai Hung; Elfyan Haqiem; Kwee Yik Han; Law Zheng Hao; Marcus Lim; Nico Lim; Lim Pin Heng; Lim Wen Kai; Ng Hao Ming; Aaron Ong; Teo Jia Wei; Yan Zexun	An Hyun-jin; Cho Young-bhin; Gu Ja-uk; Hwang Min-gyu; Kang Shin-hong; Kim Hwi-ju; Kim Hyun-soo; Kim Young-chae; Lee Jae-young; Lee Je-hyeong; Oh Hae-seong; Park Cheol-min; Shin Dong-jin; Sim Hyoun-joon	Sukon Boonem; Kasemsit Borriboonwasin; Chaiyakarn Choochuen; Suradet Faengnoi; Pornprom Kramsuk; Natthapon Kreepkamrai; Suwan Kwanthong; Phatthara Sangdet; Somchai Sangmuang; Chitsanupong Sangpan; Nopphadol Sangthuang; Vinya Seechomchuen; Pornchai Tesdee; Phakdee Wannamanee

== Results ==
=== Heats ===
- Qualification: 1 + Next best time → Grand final (GF), Rest → Semifinals (SF)

==== Heat 1 ====
Rank	Team	Time	Notes
1	Myanmar	2:10.903	GF
2	Thailand	2:10.933	SF
3	Chinese Taipei	2:13.564	SF
4	South Korea	2:13.774	SF
5	Singapore	2:19.054	SF
6	Hong Kong	2:24.328	SF

==== Heat 2 ====
Rank	Team	Time	Notes
1	China	2:09.685	GF
2	Indonesia	2:09.698	GF
3	North Korea	2:11.775	SF
4	Malaysia	2:14.539	SF
5	Macau	2:16.349	SF
6	Cambodia	2:18.769	SF

=== Semifinals ===
- Qualification: 1 + Next best time → Grand final (GF), Rest → Minor final (MF)

==== Semifinal 1 ====
Rank	Team	Time	Notes
1	Thailand	2:12.422	GF
2	South Korea	2:12.802	GF
3	Malaysia	2:15.882	MF
4	Singapore	2:22.063	MF
5	Hong Kong	2:26.986	MF

==== Semifinal 2 ====
Rank	Team	Time	Notes
1	North Korea	2:12.680	GF
2	Chinese Taipei	2:13.800	MF
3	Macau	2:16.510	MF
4	Cambodia	2:17.070	MF

=== Finals ===
==== Minor final ====
Rank	Team	Time
1	Chinese Taipei	2:14.429
2	Malaysia	2:15.363
3	Cambodia	2:16.410
4	Macau	2:17.616
5	Hong Kong	2:17.840
6	Singapore	2:19.693

==== Grand final ====
Rank	Team	Time
1st place, gold medalist(s)	China	2:09.152
2nd place, silver medalist(s)	Indonesia	2:09.165
3rd place, bronze medalist(s)	Thailand	2:09.822
4	North Korea	2:10.789
5	Myanmar	2:11.162
6	South Korea	2:11.796
