= Thailand at the 2022 Asian Games =

- Flag of Thailand
- IOC code: THA
- NOC: Thailand Olympic Committee

in Hangzhou, Zhejiang, China
- Competitors: 929
- Flag bearers: Weerapon Jongjoho, Tanyaporn Prucksakorn (opening)
- Medals Ranked 8th: Gold 12 Silver 14 Bronze 32 Total 58

Asian Games appearances (overview)
- 1951; 1954; 1958; 1962; 1966; 1970; 1974; 1978; 1982; 1986; 1990; 1994; 1998; 2002; 2006; 2010; 2014; 2018; 2022; 2026

Thailand competed at the 2022 Asian Games in Hangzhou, China, from 23 September 2023 to 8 October 2023.

== Medal summary ==
=== Medals by sport ===
Medals by sport
Sport	Gold	Silver	Bronze	Total
Sepak takraw	4	0	0	4
Sailing	3	2	2	7
Golf	2	1	0	3
Taekwondo	2	0	2	4
Esports	1	1	2	4
Boxing	0	3	4	7
Athletics	0	2	0	2
Weightlifting	0	1	3	4
Dragon boat	0	1	2	3
Canoeing	0	1	1	2
Cycling	0	1	1	2
Equestrian	0	1	1	2
Ju-jitsu	0	0	2	2
Karate	0	0	2	2
Kurash	0	0	2	2
Badminton	0	0	1	1
Bridge	0	0	1	1
Roller sports	0	0	1	1
Rowing	0	0	1	1
Shooting	0	0	1	1
Table tennis	0	0	1	1
Tennis	0	0	1	1
Volleyball	0	0	1	1
Total	12	14	32	58

=== Medals by day ===
Medals by day
Day	Date	1st place, gold medalist(s)	2nd place, silver medalist(s)	3rd place, bronze medalist(s)	Total
1	September 24	0	0	1	1
2	September 25	1	0	1	2
3	September 26	1	0	3	4
4	September 27	4	3	3	10
5	September 28	0	0	1	1
6	September 29	2	0	0	2
7	September 30	0	1	5	6
8	October 1	2	2	0	4
9	October 2	0	1	2	3
10	October 3	0	4	3	7
11	October 4	0	1	5	6
12	October 5	0	2	3	5
13	October 6	0	0	3	3
14	October 7	2	0	2	4
Total		12	14	32	58

== Medalists ==
The following Thailand competitors won medals at the Games.

No.	Medal	Name	Sport	Event	Date
1	Gold	Panipak Wongpattanakit	Taekwondo	Women's 49 kg	25 September
2	Gold	Banlung Tubtimdang	Taekwondo	Men's 63 kg	26 September
3	Gold	Weka Bhanubandh	Sailing	Boy's ICLA4	27 September
4	Gold	Noppassorn Khunboonjan	Sailing	Girl's ICLA4	27 September
5	Gold	Siripon Kaewduangngam	Sailing	Women's RS:X	27 September
6	Gold	Teedech Songsaisakul	Esports	EA Sports FC Online	27 September
7	Gold	Masaya Duangsri; Primprapha Kaewkhamsai; Kaewjai Pumsawangkaew; Pruksa Maneewong; Ratsamee Thongsod; Manlika Bunthod; Somruedee Pruepruk; Wiphada Chitphuan; Sirinan Khiaopak; Usa Srikhamlue; Nipaporn Salupphon; Wassana Soiraya	Sepak takraw	Women's team regu	29 September
8	Gold	Siriwat Sakha; Thawisak Thongsai; Pattarapong Yupadee; Rachan Viphan; Pornthep Tinbangbon; Sittipong Khamchan; Varayut Jantarasena; Wichan Temkort; Kritsanapong Nontakote; Pichet Pansan; Tanaphon Sapyen; Marukin Phanmakon	Sepak takraw	Men's team regu	29 September
9	Gold	Arpichaya Yubol	Golf	Women's individual	1 October
10	Gold	Eila Galitsky; Patcharajutar Kongkraphan; Arpichaya Yubol	Golf	Women's team	1 October
11	Gold	Siriwat Sakha; Pattarapong Yupadee; Sittipong Khamchan; Varayut Jantarasena; Pichet Pansan	Sepak takraw	Men's regu	7 October
12	Gold	Manlika Bunthod; Primprapha Kaewkhamsai; Sirinan Khiaopak; Wassana Soiraya; Wiphada Chitphuan	Sepak takraw	Women's regu	7 October
1	Silver	Natthaphong Phonoppharat	Sailing	Men's RS:X	27 September
2	Silver	Benyapa Jantawan	Sailing	Women's Kite	27 September
3	Silver	Phatanasak Varanan	Esports	EA Sports FC Online	27 September
4	Silver	Puripol Boonson	Athletics	Men's 100 metres	30 September
5	Silver	Komet Sukprasert	Cycling	Men's BMX race	1 October
6	Silver	Phachara Khongwatmai; Atiruj Winaicharoenchai; Danthai Boonma; Poom Saksansin	Golf	Men's team	1 October
7	Silver	Korntawat Samran	Equestrian	Individual eventing	2 October
8	Silver	Orasa Thiangkathok	Canoeing	Women's C-1 200 metres	3 October
9	Silver	Chuthamat Raksat	Boxing	Women's 50 kg	3 October
10	Silver	Weeraphon Wichuma	Weightlifting	Men's 73 kg	3 October
11	Silver	Supawan Thipat; Supanich Poolkerd; Onuma Chattha; Sukanda Petraksa	Athletics	Women's 4 × 100 m relay	3 October
12	Silver	Pornchai Tesdee; Chaiyakarn Choochuen; Chitsanupong Sangpan; Kasemsit Borriboonwasin; Pornprom Kramsuk; Phakdee Wannamanee; Nopphadol Sangthuang; Somchai Sangmuang; Sukon Boonem; Suradet Faengnoi; Suwan Kwanthong; Vinya Seechomchuen; Natthapon Kreepkamrai; Phatthara Sangdet	Dragon boat	Men's 200 metres	4 October
13	Silver	Janjaem Suwannapheng	Boxing	Women's 66 kg	5 October
14	Silver	Thitisan Panmot	Boxing	Men's 51 kg	5 October
1	Bronze	Nuntida Krajangjam; Parisa Chaempudsa	Rowing	Women's double sculls	24 September
2	Bronze	Suthasini Sawettabut; Orawan Paranang; Tamolwan Khetkhuan; Jinnipa Sawettabut; Wanwisa Aueawiriyayothin	Table tennis	Women's team	25 September
3	Bronze	Vatcharanan Thaworn; Anusak Manpdong; Kawee Wachiraphas; Sorawat Boonphrom; Chayut Suebka	Esports	Arena of Valor	26 September
4	Bronze	Chutikan Jongkolrattanawattana	Taekwondo	Women's 53 kg	26 September
5	Bronze	Phannapa Harnsujin	Taekwondo	Women's 57 kg	26 September
6	Bronze	Joseph Jonathan Weston	Sailing	Men's Kite	27 September
7	Bronze	Aticha Homraruen	Sailing	Women's iQFoil	27 September
8	Bronze	Isarapa Imprasertsuk; Sutiya Jiewchaloemmit; Nutchaya Sutarporn	Shooting	Women's skeet team	27 September
9	Bronze	Pruchya Isaro; Maximus Parapol Jones	Tennis	Men's doubles	28 September
10	Bronze	Kunathip Yeaon	Kurash	Men's +90 kg	30 September
11	Bronze	Saowalak Homklin	Kurash	Women's 52 kg	30 September
12	Bronze	Supissara Paewsampran; Sapsiree Taerattanachai; Benyapa Aimsaard; Nuntakarn Aimsaard; Rawinda Prajongjai; Jongkolphan Kititharakul; Supanida Katethong; Busanan Ongbamrungphan; Pornpawee Chochuwong	Badminton	Women's team	30 September
13	Bronze	Walunchai Sukarin; Attakit Samattakitwanich; Teerapat Supasdetch; Chatchapon Chanthorn; Pachara Thongeiam; Werit Popan	Esports	Dream Three Kingdoms 2	30 September
14	Bronze	Thanyathon Sukcharoen	Weightlifting	Women's 49 kg	30 September
15	Bronze	Supap Khawngam; Preecha Khunjan; Korntawat Samran; Weerapat Pitakanonda	Equestrian	Team eventing	2 October
16	Bronze	Orasa Thiangkathok; Aphinya Sroichit	Canoeing	Women's C-2 500 metres	2 October
17	Bronze	Baison Manikon	Boxing	Women's 75 kg	3 October
18	Bronze	Thananya Somnuek	Boxing	Women's 60 kg	3 October
19	Bronze	Bunjong Sinsiri	Boxing	Men's 63.5 kg	3 October
20	Bronze	Ketkanok Chomchey; Pranchalee Moonkasem; Onuma Teeranaew; Anuthida Saeheng; Arisara Pantulap; Benjamas Woranuch; Jaruwan Chaikan; Jirawan Hankhamla; Patthama Nanthain; Praewpan Kawsri; Sukanya Poradok; Watcharaporn Khadtiya; Nipaporn Nopsri; Thitima Sukrat	Dragon boat	Women's 200 metres	4 October
21	Bronze	Jutatip Maneephan	Cycling	Women's road race	4 October
22	Bronze	Natnanda Pasutanavin; Wattapong Kongpan	Roller sports	Mixed inline slalom pair	4 October
23	Bronze	Rujakran Juntrong	Boxing	Men's 57 kg	4 October
24	Bronze	Panjaroon Jariyanuntanaet; Wanna Amornmeswarintara; Kanokporn Janebunjong; Kridsadayut Plengsap; Pavinee Sitthicharoensawat; Kirawat Limsinsopon	Bridge	Mixed team	4 October
25	Bronze	Pornchai Tesdee; Chaiyakarn Choochuen; Chitsanupong Sangpan; Kasemsit Borriboonwasin; Pornprom Kramsuk; Phakdee Wannamanee; Nopphadol Sangthuang; Somchai Sangmuang; Sukon Boonem; Suradet Faengnoi; Suwan Kwanthong; Vinya Seechomchuen; Natthapon Kreepkamrai; Phatthara Sangdet	Dragon boat	Men's 500 metres	5 October
26	Bronze	Pechrada Kacie Tan	Ju-jitsu	Women's 48 kg	5 October
27	Bronze	Sarat Sumpradit	Weightlifting	Men's 96 kg	5 October
28	Bronze	Orapa Senatham	Ju-jitsu	Women's 57 kg	6 October
29	Bronze	Siwakon Muekthong	Karate	Men's 60 kg kumite	6 October
30	Bronze	Teerawat Kangtong	Karate	Men's +84 kg kumite	6 October
31	Bronze	Duangaksorn Chaidee	Weightlifting	Women's +87 kg	7 October
32	Bronze	Wipawee Srithong; Piyanut Pannoy; Pornpun Guedpard; Thatdao Nuekjang; Hattaya Bamrungsuk; Pimpichaya Kokram; Sasipapron Janthawisut; Ajcharaporn Kongyot; Chatchu-On Moksri; Thanacha Sooksod; Sirima Manakij; Jarasporn Bundasak	Volleyball	Women	7 October

== Aquatics – Artistic swimming ==
Athlete	Event	Acrobatic routine		Technical routine		Free routine		Total	Rank
Athlete	Event	Points	Rank	Points	Rank	Points	Rank	Total	Rank
Pongpimporn Pongsuwan; Supitchaya Songpan	Duet	—N/a		176.6717	9	136.5459	9	313.2176	8
Jinnipha Adisaisiributr; Kantinan Adisaisiributr; Patrawee Chayawararak; Nannapat Duangprasert; Chantaras Jarupraditlert; Pongpimporn Pongsuwan; Supitchaya Songpan; Voranan Toomchay; Chalisa Sinsawat; Nichapa Takiennut	Team	150.9001	7	165.2154	8	160.5272	7	476.6427	8

== Aquatics – Diving ==
=== Men ===
Athlete	Event	Preliminary		Final	
Athlete	Event	Score	Rank	Score	Rank
Chawanwat Juntaphadawon	1m springboard	—N/a		311.40	5
Chawanwat Juntaphadawon	3m springboard	355.60	7 Q	340.70	8
Thitiwut Phoemphun	1m springboard	—N/a		204.10	13
Thitiwut Phoemphun	3m springboard	248.15	15	Did not advance	
Adithep Khopuechklang	10m platform	194.60	13	Did not advance	

=== Women ===
Athlete	Event	Preliminary		Final	
Athlete	Event	Score	Rank	Score	Rank
Lilli Prateep	1m springboard	—N/a		204.30	10
Lilli Prateep	3m springboard	162.85	9 Q	198.55	9

== Aquatics – Marathon swimming ==
Athlete	Event	Time	Rank
Tanakrit Kittiya	Men's marathon 10 kilometre	2:02:20.5	9
Khomchan Wichachai	Men's marathon 10 kilometre	DSQ	
Pimpun Choopong	Women's marathon 10 kilometre	2:16:43.3	12
Thitirat Charoensup	Women's marathon 10 kilometre	2:19:40.6	13

== Aquatics – Swimming ==
=== Men ===
Athlete	Event	Heats		Final	
Athlete	Event	Time	Rank	Time	Rank
Tonnam Kanteemool	50 m freestyle	23.10	11	Did not advance	
Tonnam Kanteemool	100 m freestyle	54.87	35	Did not advance	
Tonnam Kanteemool	200 m freestyle	1:51.42	13	Did not advance	
Tonnam Kanteemool	50 m backstroke	26.05	11	Did not advance	
Tonnam Kanteemool	100 m backstroke	56.02	8 Q	55.73	8
Tonnam Kanteemool	200 m backstroke	2:03.89	9	Did not advance	
Dulyawat Kaewsriyong	50 m freestyle	23.49	16	Did not advance	
Dulyawat Kaewsriyong	100 m freestyle	50.26	11	Did not advance	
Dulyawat Kaewsriyong	200 m freestyle	1:51.99	15	Did not advance	
Dulyawat Kaewsriyong	100 m breaststroke	1:04.86	19	Did not advance	
Dulyawat Kaewsriyong	400 m individual medley	4:32.50	13	Did not advance	
Slava Sihanouvong	50 m freestyle	26.51	39	Did not advance	
Ratthawit Thammananthachote	400 m freestyle	3:57.88	10	Did not advance	
Ratthawit Thammananthachote	800 m freestyle	—N/a		8:07.17	8
Ratthawit Thammananthachote	1500 m freestyle	—N/a		15:35.48	8
Ratthawit Thammananthachote	50 m backstroke	27.37	23	Did not advance	
Ratthawit Thammananthachote	100 m backstroke	58.32	19	Did not advance	
Ratthawit Thammananthachote	200 m backstroke	2:04.57	11	Did not advance	
Thanonchai Janruksa	50 m breaststroke	28.83	12	Did not advance	
Thanonchai Janruksa	100 m breaststroke	1:04.41	17	Did not advance	
Thanonchai Janruksa	200 m breaststroke	2:25.14	16	Did not advance	
Rachasil Mahamongkol	50 m breaststroke	29.50	15	Did not advance	
Rachasil Mahamongkol	200 m breaststroke	2:20.25	14	Did not advance	
Navaphat Wongcharoen	50 m butterfly	24.71	21	Did not advance	
Navaphat Wongcharoen	100 m butterfly	53.69	11	Did not advance	
Navaphat Wongcharoen	200 m butterfly	2:01.54	8 Q	2:00.50	8
Supha Sangaworawong	50 m butterfly	25.17	23	Did not advance	
Surasit Thongdeang	50 m butterfly	54.78	17	Did not advance	
Surasit Thongdeang	200 m butterfly	2:04.89	12	Did not advance	
Surasit Thongdeang	200 m individual medley	2:08.08	17	Did not advance	
Pongpanod Trithan	200 m individual medley	2:14.99	18	Did not advance	
Dulyawat Kaewsriyong; Pongpanod Trithan; Navaphat Wongcharoen; Tonnam Kanteemool	4 × 100m freestyle relay	3:23.15	7 Q	3:22.24	7
Dulyawat Kaewsriyong; Pongpanod Trithan; Ratthawit Thammananthachote; Tonnam Kanteemool	4 × 200m freestyle relay	7:33.79	9	Did not advance	
Tonnam Kanteemool; Thanonchai Janruksa; Navaphat Wongcharoen; Dulyawat Kaewsriyong	4 × 100m medley relay	3:43.52	8 Q	3:43.18	7

=== Women ===
Athlete	Event	Heats		Final	
Athlete	Event	Time	Rank	Time	Rank
Jenjira Srisaard	50 m freestyle	25.74	11	Did not advance	
Jenjira Srisaard	50 m breaststroke	31.58	8 Q	31.25	8
Jenjira Srisaard	50 m butterfly	26.85	6 Q	26.95	7
Kornkarnjana Sapianchai	50 m freestyle	27.10	20	Did not advance	
Kornkarnjana Sapianchai	100 m freestyle	58.79	18	Did not advance	
Kornkarnjana Sapianchai	200 m freestyle	2:10.19	16	Did not advance	
Kornkarnjana Sapianchai	100 m butterfly	1:04.57	15	Did not advance	
Kamonchanok Kwanmuang	100 m freestyle	57.89	14	Did not advance	
Kamonchanok Kwanmuang	400 m freestyle	4:17.97	7 Q	4:15.56	7
Kamonchanok Kwanmuang	800 m freestyle	—N/a		8:51.65	8
Kamonchanok Kwanmuang	200 m butterfly	2:11.87	5 Q	2:10.68	6
Kamonchanok Kwanmuang	200 m individual medley	2:16.23	6 Q	2:14.79	5
Kamonchanok Kwanmuang	400 m individual medley	4:48.07	4 Q	4:44.04	5
Napatsawan Jaritkla	200 m freestyle	2:07.19	13	Did not advance	
Napatsawan Jaritkla	100 m butterfly	1:01.61	10	Did not advance	
Yarinda Sunthornrangsri	200 m freestyle	4:33.03	13	Did not advance	
Yarinda Sunthornrangsri	800 m freestyle	—N/a		9:21.10	14
Saovanee Boonamphai	50 m backstroke	29.59	13	Did not advance	
Saovanee Boonamphai	100 m backstroke	1:07.32	21	Did not advance	
Mia Millar	50 m backstroke	30.52	21	Did not advance	
Mia Millar	100 m backstroke	1:05.40	18	Did not advance	
Mia Millar	200 m backstroke	2:20.54	12	Did not advance	
Jinjutha Pholjamjumrus	200 m backstroke	2:19.79	10	Did not advance	
Jinjutha Pholjamjumrus	200 m butterfly	2:13.90	8 Q	2:15.22	8
Jinjutha Pholjamjumrus	200 m individual medley	2:19.95	11	Did not advance	
Jinjutha Pholjamjumrus	400 m individual medley	4:54.12	6 Q	4:50.07	6
Phurichaya Junyamitree	100 m breaststroke	1:11.67	13	Did not advance	
Phurichaya Junyamitree	200 m breaststroke	2:40.29	12	Did not advance	
Phiangkhwan Pawapotako	100 m breaststroke	1:12.42	17	Did not advance	
Phiangkhwan Pawapotako	200 m breaststroke	2:33.97	9	Did not advance	
Pannita Chawanuchit	50 m butterfly	29.82	21	Did not advance	
Kornkarnjana Sapianchai; Kamonchanok Kwanmuang; Mia Millar; Napatsawan Jaritkla	4 × 100m freestyle relay	3:54.37	7 Q	3:52.87	6
Kamonchanok Kwanmuang; Kornkarnjana Sapianchai; Napatsawan Jaritkla; Jinjutha Pholjamjumrus	4 × 200m freestyle relay	8:31.02	7 Q	8:22.73	6
Mia Millar; Phurichaya Junyamitree; Napatsawan Jaritkla; Kamonchanok Kwanmuang	4 × 100m medley relay	4:18.54	8 Q	4:14.99	7

=== Mixed ===
Athlete	Event	Heats		Final	
Athlete	Event	Time	Rank	Time	Rank
Saovanee Boonamphai; Thanonchai Janruksa; Surasit Thongdeang; Kornkarnjana Sapianchai	4 × 100m medley relay	4:04.83	9	Did not advance	

== Aquatics – Water polo ==
=== Men ===
Team	Event	Group Stage				Quarterfinal	Semifinal / Pl.	Final / BM / Pl.	
Team	Event	Opposition Score	Opposition Score	Opposition Score	Rank	Opposition Score	Opposition Score	Opposition Score	Rank
Thailand men's	Men's tournament	China; L 8–27	Iran; L 7–26	South Korea; L 7–23	4 Q	Japan; L 2–23	Singapore; L 6–9	Hong Kong; L 19–20	8

=== Women ===
Team	Event	Round robin						
Team	Event	Opposition Score	Opposition Score	Opposition Score	Opposition Score	Opposition Score	Opposition Score	Rank
Thailand women's	Women's tournament	Japan; L 10–32	Uzbekistan; W 17–11	Singapore; L 6–7	Kazakhstan; L 8–13	China; L 9–26	South Korea; W 20–7	5

== Archery ==
=== Recurve ===
Athlete	Event	Qualification		Round of 64	Round of 32	Round of 16	Round of 8	Quarterfinal	Semifinal	Final / BM	
Athlete	Event	Score	Rank	Opposition Score	Opposition Score	Opposition Score	Opposition Score	Opposition Score	Opposition Score	Opposition Score	Rank
Tanapat Pathairat	Men's individual	636	50 Q	Ri Tae-bom (PRK); W 6–4	Lee Woo-seok (KOR); L 2–6	Did not advance					
Phonthakorn Chaislip	Men's individual	629	58 Q	Lam Dorji (BHU); L 1–7	Did not advance						
Witthaya Thamwong	Men's individual	625	62	Did not advance							
Denchai Thepna	Men's individual	583	79	Did not advance							
Sataporn Artsalee	Women's individual	615	44 Q	Gabrielle Monica Bidaure (PHI); W 6–2	Hai Ligan (CHN); L 0–6	Did not advance					
Narisara Khunhiranchaiyo	Women's individual	611	45 Q	Mavzuna Azimova (TJK); W 7–3	Lim Si-hyeon (KOR); L 0–6	Did not advance					
Punika Jongkraijak	Women's individual	609	46	Did not advance							
Chunyaphak Kanjana	Women's individual	509	76	Did not advance							
Tanapat Pathairat; Phonthakorn Chaislip; Witthaya Thamwong	Men's team	1890	15 Q	—N/a		Chinese Taipei; W 5–4	Bangladesh; L 4–5	Did not advance			
Sataporn Artsalee; Narisara Khunhiranchaiyo; Punika Jongkraijak	Women's team	1835	12 Q	—N/a		India; L 1–5	Did not advance				

=== Compound ===
Athlete	Event	Qualification		Round of 64	Round of 32	Round of 16	Round of 8	Quarterfinal	Semifinal	Final / BM	
Athlete	Event	Score	Rank	Opposition Score	Opposition Score	Opposition Score	Opposition Score	Opposition Score	Opposition Score	Opposition Score	Rank
Sirapop Chainak	Men's individual	688	31 Q	Bye	Akbarali Karabayev (KAZ); L 146–146 (SO: 9–X)	Did not advance					
Kittiphat Uthaimongkol	Men's individual	688	34 Q	Bye	Tandin Dorji (BHU); L 142–148	Did not advance					
Ratanadanai Wongtana	Men's individual	686	36	Did not advance							
Nitiphum Chatachot	Men's individual	683	40	Did not advance							
Kanyavee Maneesombatkul	Women's individual	681	20 Q	Bye	Fatin Nurfatehah; Mat Salleh (MAS); W 141–140	Oh Yoo-hyun (KOR); L 143–147	Did not advance				
Nichapat Bunyapalin	Women's individual	676	24 Q	Bye	Fatimah Almashhadani (IRQ); L 139–140	Did not advance					
Kanoknapus Kaewchomphu	Women's individual	674	28	Did not advance							
Kodchaporn Pratumsawan	Women's individual	671	32	Did not advance							
Kittiphat Uthaimongkol; Sirapop Chainak; Ratanadanai Wongtana	Men's team	2062	9 Q	—N/a		Hong Kong; W 230–223	South Korea; L 222–228	Did not advance			
Kanyavee Maneesombatkul; Nichapat Bunyapalin; Kanoknapus Kaewchomphu	Women's team	2031	6 Q	—N/a		Bye	Chinese Taipei; L 226–227	Did not advance			
Sirapop Chainak; Kanyavee Maneesombatkul	Mixed team	1369	12 Q	—N/a		Iran; W 154–148	Kazakhstan; L 152–154	Did not advance			

== Athletics ==
=== Men ===
Track & road events

Athlete(s)	Event	Heat		Semifinal		Final	
Athlete(s)	Event	Result	Rank	Result	Rank	Result	Rank
Soraoat Dapbang	100 metres	10.26	6 Q	10.16	5 Q	DQ	
Puripol Boonson	100 metres	10.13	2 Q	10.06	2 Q	10.02	2nd place, silver medalist(s)
Puripol Boonson	200 metres	21.26	11 Q	DQ		Did not advance	
Sarawut Nuansi	400 metres	47.02	13	—N/a		Did not advance	
Joshua Robert Atkinson	800 metres	1:48.18	4 Q	—N/a		1:50.50	6
Kieran Tuntivate	5000 metres	—N/a				DNS	
Natthaphon Dansungnoen	110 metres hurdles	13.97	9	—N/a		Did not advance	
Natthaphon Dansungnoen	400 metres hurdles	50.42	12	—N/a		Did not advance	
Natawat Iamudom; Soraoat Dapbang; Chayut Khongprasit; Puripol Boonson	4 × 100 m relay	39.57	6 Q	—N/a		38.81	4
Sarawut Nuansi; Thawatchai Himaiad; Jirayu Pleenaram; Joshua Robert Atkinson	4 × 400 m relay	3:06.96	5 Q	—N/a		3:04.23	4

Field events

Athlete	Event	Qualification		Final	
Athlete	Event	Result	Rank	Result	Rank
Tawan Kaeodam	High jump	2.15	2 Q	2.26	5
Kobsit Sittichai	High jump	1.90	16	Did not advance	
Kasinpob Chomchanad	Pole vault	—N/a		5.30	7
Patsapong Amsamarng	Pole vault	—N/a		5.55	4
Jakkapat Noisri	Shot put	—N/a		17.24	10
Kiadpradid Srisai	Discus throw	—N/a		51.59	9
Kittipong Boonmawan	Hammer throw	—N/a		55.20	13
Wachirawit Sornwichai	Javelin throw	—N/a		63.29	11

Combined events – Decathlon

Athlete	Event	100H	LJ	SP	HJ	400 m	110H	DT	PV	JT	1500 m	Final	Rank
Sutthisak Singkhon	Results	11.15	7.29	14.12	1.94	50.12	15.57	40.88	4.30	48.53	5:10.24	7239	6
Sutthisak Singkhon	Points	827	883	736	749	809	782	682	702	567	502	7239	6

=== Women ===
Track & road events

Athlete(s)	Event	Heat		Final	
Athlete(s)	Event	Result	Rank	Result	Rank
Supanich Poolkerd	100 metres	11.36	5 Q	11.35	4
Benny Nontanam	400 metres	56.00	11	Did not advance	
Supawan Thipat; Supanich Poolkerd; Onuma Chattha; Sukanda Petraksa	4 × 100 m relay	—N/a		44.32	2nd place, silver medalist(s)
Sukanya Janchaona; Benny Nontanam; Montida Thongprachukaew; Angkana Thongtae	4 × 400 m relay	—N/a		3:50.44	6

Field events

Athlete	Event	Final	
Athlete	Event	Result	Rank
Chayanisa Chomchuendee	Pole vault	4.20	4
Chonthicha Khabut	Pole vault	3.80	8
Parinya Chuaimaroeng	Triple jump	13.22	7
Areerat Intadis	Shot put	15.50	8
Subenrat Insaeng	Discus throw	58.26	4
Mingkamon Koomphon	Hammer throw	60.30	8
Jariya Wichaidit	Javelin throw	53.78	8

Combined events – Heptathlon

Athlete	Event	100H	HJ	SP	200 m	LJ	JT	800 m	Final	Rank
Sunisa Khotseemueang	Results	15.09	1.61	11.06	26.90	5.34	35.35	2:39.42	4708	10
Sunisa Khotseemueang	Points	830	747	599	720	654	578	580	4708	10

=== Mixed ===
Track & road events

Athlete(s)	Event	Final	
Athlete(s)	Event	Result	Rank
Phattaraporn Dechanon; Sukanya Janchaona; Montida Thongprachukaew; Jirayu Pleenaram; Siripol Punpa; Ruamchok Semathong	4 × 400 m relay	3:26.81	4

== Badminton ==
=== Men ===
Athlete(s)	Event	Round of 64	Round of 32	Round of 16	Quarterfinal	Semifinal	Final	
Athlete(s)	Event	Opposition Score	Opposition Score	Opposition Score	Opposition Score	Opposition Score	Opposition Score	Rank
Kunlavut Vitidsarn	Singles	Bye	Nguyen Hai Dang (VIE); W (17–21, 21–18, 21–15)	Lee Zii Jia (MAS); L (21–10, 19–21, 6–21)	Did not advance			
Kantaphon Wangcharoen	Singles	Sunil Joshi (NEP); W (21–7, 21–9)	Hussein Shaheed (MDV); W (21–3, 21–5)	Ng Tze Yong (MAS); L (17–21, 12–21)	Did not advance			
Peeratchai Sukphun; Pakkapon Teeraratsakul	Doubles	—N/a	Prince Dahal / Sunil Joshi (NEP); W (21–8, 21–5)	Fajar Alfian / Muhammad Rian Ardianto (INA); L (15–21, 15–21)	Did not advance			
Supak Jomkoh; Kittinupong Kedren	Doubles	—N/a	Anish Gurung / Jimba Sangay Lhendup (BHU); W (21–4, 21–4)	Aaron Chia / Soh Wooi Yik (MAS); L (12–21, 14–21)	Did not advance			
Saran Jamsri; Supak Jomkoh; Pharanyu Kaosamaang; Kittinupong Kedren; Dechapol Puavaranukroh; Peeratchai Sukphun; Pakkapon Teeraratsakul; Panitchaphon Teeraratsakul; Kunlavut Vitidsarn; Kantaphon Wangcharoen	Team	—N/a		Hong Kong (HKG); L 2–3	Did not advance			

=== Women ===
Athlete(s)	Event	Round of 64	Round of 32	Round of 16	Quarterfinal	Semifinal	Final	
Athlete(s)	Event	Opposition Score	Opposition Score	Opposition Score	Opposition Score	Opposition Score	Opposition Score	Rank
Pornpawee Chochuwong	Singles	Bye	Anu Maya Rai (NEP); W (21–10, 21–4)	Kim Ga-eun (KOR); L (13–21, 9–21)	Did not advance			
Busanan Ongbamrungphan	Singles	Bye	Karupathevan Letshanaa (MAS); W (21–13, 21–10)	Nguyen Thuy Linh (VIE); W (21–19, 21–17)	An Se-young (KOR); L (12–21, 13–21)	Did not advance		
Jongkolphan Kititharakul; Rawinda Prajongjai	Doubles	—N/a	Mahoor Shahzad / Ghazala Siddique (PAK); W (21–5, 21–7)	Pearly Tan / Thinaah Muralitharan (MAS); L (15–21, 17–21)	Did not advance			
Benyapa Aimsaard; Nuntakarn Aimsaard	Doubles	—N/a	Bye	Nami Matsuyama / Chiharu Shida (JPN); L (16–21, 21–23)	Did not advance			
Supissara Paewsampran; Sapsiree Taerattanachai; Benyapa Aimsaard; Nuntakarn Aimsaard; Rawinda Prajongjai; Jongkolphan Kititharakul; Supanida Katethong; Busanan Ongbamrungphan; Pornpawee Chochuwong	Team	—N/a		Bye	India (IND); W 3–0	South Korea (KOR); L 1–3	Did not advance	3rd place, bronze medalist(s)

=== Mixed ===
Athlete(s)	Event	Round of 32	Round of 16	Quarterfinal	Semifinal	Final	
Athlete(s)	Event	Opposition Score	Opposition Score	Opposition Score	Opposition Score	Opposition Score	Rank
Dechapol Puavaranukroh; Sapsiree Taerattanachai	Mixed	Bye	Seo Seung-jae / Chae Yu-jung (KOR); L (13–21, 11–21)	Did not advance			
Supak Jomkoh; Supissara Paewsampran	Mixed	Ahmad Nibal / Aminath Nabeeha Abdul Razzaq (MDV); W (21–6, 21–9)	Goh Soon Huat / Shevon Jemie Lai (MAS); W (17–21, 23–21, 21–13)	Feng Yanzhe / Huang Dongping (CHN); L (14–21, 7–21)	Did not advance		

== Baseball ==
Team	Event	Round 1		Round 2		Super / Placement Round		Final / BM	
Team	Event	Oppositions Scores	Rank	Oppositions Scores	Rank	Oppositions Scores	Rank	Opposition Score	Rank
Thailand men's	Men's tournament	Laos: W 4–1; Singapore: W 17–0	1 Q	Chinese Taipei: L 1–12; Hong Kong: L 0–8; South Korea: L 0–17	4 QP	Laos: W 6–0; Philippines: L 1–11	3	Did not advance	7

== Basketball ==
=== 5x5 tournament ===
Team	Event	Group Play		Qualification for quarterfinals	Quarterfinal	Semifinals / Pl.	Final / BM / Pl.	
Team	Event	Opposition Scores	Rank	Opposition Score	Opposition Score	Opposition Score	Opposition Score	Rank
Thailand men's	Men's tournament	Jordan: L 63−97; Philippines: L 72−87; Bahrain: L 62−76	4	Did not advance				
Thailand women's	Women's tournament	South Korea: L 56−90; Chinese Taipei: L 54−58; North Korea: L 49−105	4	—N/a	Did not advance			

=== 3x3 tournament ===
Team	Event	Group Play		Qualification for quarterfinals	Quarterfinal	Semifinals / Pl.	Final / BM / Pl.	
Team	Event	Opposition Scores	Rank	Opposition Score	Opposition Score	Opposition Score	Opposition Score	Rank
Thailand men's	Men's 3x3 tournament	Cambodia: W 21−10; Qatar: L 12−16; Kazakhstan: L 16−19; Kyrgyzstan: W 22−5	3 Q	Chinese Taipei; L 17−19	Did not advance			
Thailand women's	Women's 3x3 tournament	South Korea: L 10−12; Malaysia: L 11−14; Maldives: W 22−2	3 Q	Uzbekistan; W 19−7	Mongolia; L 13−16	Did not advance		

== Boxing ==
=== Men ===
Athlete	Event	Round of 32	Round of 16	Quarterfinals	Semifinals	Final	
Athlete	Event	Opposition Result	Opposition Result	Opposition Result	Opposition Result	Opposition Result	Rank
Thitisan Panmot	51 kg	Aaron Bado (PHI); W RSC–I	Tu Po-wei (TPE); W 4–1	Zhang Jiamao (CHN); W 5–0	So Chonryong (PRK); W 3–2	Hasanboy Dusmatov (UZB); L 0–5	2nd place, silver medalist(s)
Rujakran Juntrong	57 kg	Rex Tso (HKG); W 5–0	Wasim Abusal (PLE); W 5–0	O Tae-bom (PRK); W 5–0	Shudai Harada (JPN); L 2–3	Did not advance	3rd place, bronze medalist(s)
Bunjong Sinsiri	63.5 kg	Ali Habibinezhad (IRI); W 5–0	Mohammed Soud (PLE); W RSC	Choe Chol-man (PRK); W 3–2	Baatarsükhiin Chinzorig (MGL); L 0–5	Did not advance	3rd place, bronze medalist(s)
Peerapat Yeasungnoen	71 kg	Bye	Byambatsogtyn Tögöldör (MGL); L 0–5	Did not advance			
Weerapon Jongjoho	80 kg	Bye	Issei Aramoto (JPN); W RSC	Eumir Marcial (PHI); L KO	Did not advance		

=== Women ===
Athlete	Event	Round of 32	Round of 16	Quarterfinals	Semifinals	Final	
Athlete	Event	Opposition Result	Opposition Result	Opposition Result	Opposition Result	Opposition Result	Rank
Chuthamat Raksat	50 kg	Bye	Tsukimi Namiki (JPN); W 5–0	Ruhafzo Haqnazarova (TJK); W 5–0	Nikhat Zareen (IND); W 3–2	Wu Yu (CHN); L 0–5	2nd place, silver medalist(s)
Jutamas Jitpong	54 kg	—N/a	Chang Yuan (CHN); L 2–3	Did not advance			
Porntip Buapa	57 kg	—N/a	Chandrakala Thapa (NEP); W 5–0	Lin Yu-ting (TPE); L 0–5	Did not advance		
Thananya Somnuek	60 kg	Bibinashastamo Kholova (TJK); W RSC	Riza Pasuit (PHI); W WO	Huswatun Hasanah (INA); W RSC	Won Ungyong (PRK); L 0–5	Did not advance	3rd place, bronze medalist(s)
Janjaem Suwannapheng	66 kg	—N/a	Navbakhor Khamidova (UZB); W 5–0	Seon Su-jin (KOR); W 5–0	Natalya Bogdanova (KAZ); W RSC	Yang Liu (CHN); L 0–5	2nd place, silver medalist(s)
Baison Manikon	75 kg	—N/a	Aziza Zokirova (UZB); W 5–0	Enkhbaataryn Erdenetuya (MGL); W 5–0	Lovlina Borgohain (IND); L 0–5	Did not advance	3rd place, bronze medalist(s)

== Breakdancing ==
Athlete	Event	Pre-selection		Group Stage				Knockouts	Semifinal	Final	
Athlete	Event	Point	Rank	Opposition Score	Opposition Score	Opposition Score	Rank	Opposition Score	Opposition Score	Opposition Score	Rank
Kantapon Rodsaart	B-Boys	561.90	15 Q	Talgat Sherov (UZB); D 1–1	Kim Heon-woo (KOR); L 0–2	Sun Chen (TPE); L 0–2	3	Did not advance			
Chinavut Chantarat	B-Boys	553.70	16 Q	Djamal Asadulayev (UZB); L 0–2	Kim Hong-yul (KOR); L 0–2	Qi Xiangyu (CHN); L 0–2	4	Did not advance			
Thanawadee Suthisiri	B-Girls	558.40	12 Q	Alyanna Talam (PHI); W 2–0	Zeng Yingying (CHN); L 0–2	Kwon Seong-hui (KOR); L 0–2	3	Did not advance			
Areerat Numto	B-Girls	357.70	18	Did not advance							

== Canoeing ==
=== Slalom ===
Men

Athlete	Event	Heat 1		Heat 2		Semifinal		Final	
Athlete	Event	Total	Rank	Total	Rank	Total	Rank	Total	Rank
Nantipat Ongchit	C–1	108.32	10	170.34	5 SF	122.75	9	Did not advance	
Yutthakan Chaidet	C–1	105.06	9	108.01	3 SF	108.48	8 F	111.37	5
Janyawut Mangjit	K–1	107.49	8 SF	—N/a		155.12	12	Did not advance	
Piyanath Koetsuk	K–1	106.20	7 SF	—N/a		113.10	8 F	107.50	6

Women

Athlete	Event	Heat 1		Heat 2		Semifinal		Final	
Athlete	Event	Total	Rank	Total	Rank	Total	Rank	Total	Rank
Kanda Chomkogsung	C–1	290.41	6	131.35	2 SF	155.65	4	Did not advance	
Atcharaporn Duanglawa	C–1	116.44	3 SF	—N/a		129.20	3 F	126.56	4
Praewpran Phonwa	K–1	Did not finish		235.59	4 SF	323.28	8	Did not advance	
Jaruwan Niamthong	K–1	114.87	6	119.58	1 SF	200.45	7 F	133.51	5

=== Sprint ===
Men

Athlete	Event	Heats		Semifinal		Final	
Athlete	Event	Time	Rank	Time	Rank	Time	Rank
Kritsana Chuangchan	C–1 1000m	4:48.127	4 SF	5:00.202	4	Did not advance	
Pitpiboon Mahawattanangkul; Mongkhonchai Sisong	C–2 500m	1:51.265	3 QF	—N/a		1:53.651	6
Kritsana Chuangchan; Anusit Somrup	C–2 1000m	—N/a				4:26.028	8
Natthaphat Chaijantuek	K–1 1000m	4:27.198	6 SF	4:40.004	6	Did not advance	
Praison Buasamrong; Methasit Sitthipharat	K–2 500m	1:44.380	6 SF	1:42.908	2 QF	1:43.114	5
Natthaphat Chaijantuek; Narongsak Phonkham; Aditep Srichart; Aphisit Thanom	K–4 500m	1:40.223	5 SF	1:37.205	3 QF	1:36.447	9

Women

Athlete	Event	Heats		Semifinal		Final	
Athlete	Event	Time	Rank	Time	Rank	Time	Rank
Orasa Thiangkathok	C–1 200m	53.027	2 QF	—N/a		49.221	2nd place, silver medalist(s)
Aphinya Sroichit; Kewalin Takhianram	C–2 200m	—N/a				50.268	6
Orasa Thiangkathok; Aphinya Sroichit	C–2 500m	—N/a				2:08.257	3rd place, bronze medalist(s)
Khanyakron Suphawatthanakon	K–1 500m	2:18.192	5 SF	2:18.260	3 QF	2:15.328	9
Pornnapphan Phuangmaiming; Panwad Thongnim	K–2 500m	1:58.913	4 SF	2:08.693	3 QF	2:01.512	8
Pornnapphan Phuangmaiming; Panwad Thongnim; Suthasinee Autnun; Mingkamon Phromsri	K–4 500m	—N/a				1:53.776	7

== Cricket ==
Team	Event	Preliminary Round		Quarterfinal	Semifinal	Final / BM	
Team	Event	Opposition Scores	Rank	Opposition Score	Opposition Score	Opposition Score	Rank
Thailand men's	Men's tournament	Singapore: L 53 (15.3 overs) – 152/8 (20 overs); Malaysia: L 74/9 (20 overs) – 268/4 (20 overs)	3	Did not advance			13
Thailand women's	Women's tournament	Bye		Sri Lanka; L 78/7 (15 overs) – 84/2 (10.5 overs)	Did not advance		5

== Cycling ==
=== BMX ===
Athlete	Event	Seeding run		Moto(s)		Final	
Athlete	Event	Time	Rank	Point	Rank	Time	Rank
Apisit Jaiyoo	Men's BMX race	42.506	10	16	6	Did not advance	
Komet Sukprasert	Men's BMX race	37.865	1	3	1 Q	38.478	2nd place, silver medalist(s)
Waranya Saetae	Women's BMX race	49.144	7	18	6	—N/a	
Chutikan Kitwanitsathian	Women's BMX race	47.082	6	24	8	—N/a	

=== Mountain biking ===
Athlete	Event	Final	
Athlete	Event	Time	Rank
Phunsiri Sirimongkhon	Men's cross-country	-1 lap	11
Keerati Sukprasart	Men's cross-country	-2 laps	12
Yonthanan Phonkla	Women's cross-country	-1 lap	10
Supuksorn Nuntana	Women's cross-country	-1 lap	11

=== Road ===
Athlete	Event	Final	
Athlete	Event	Time	Rank
Peerapol Chawchiangkwang	Men's individual time trial	52:36.22	10
Phetdarin Somrat	Women's individual time trial	28:13.75	12
Peerapol Chawchiangkwang	Men's road race	4:34:03	30
Thanakhan Chaiyasombat	Men's road race	4:31:15	13
Navuti Liphongyu	Men's road race	4:32:52	26
Sarawut Sirironnachai	Men's road race	4:31:13	10
Chaniporn Batriya	Women's road race	3:37:22	23
Jutatip Maneephan	Women's road race	3:36:07	3rd place, bronze medalist(s)

=== Track ===
==== Men ====
Athlete	Event	Qualifying		First Round / Round of 16				Round of 8				Quarterfinals		Semifinals		Finals / BM / Pl.	
Athlete	Event	Time	Rank	Time	Rank	Repechage	Rank	Time	Rank	Repechage	Rank	Time	Rank	Time	Rank	Time/Score	Rank
Jai Angsuthasawit	Keirin	—N/a		+0.665	4 R	+1.063	6	Did not advance									
Jai Angsuthasawit	Sprint	10.191	15 Q	+0.054	2 R	+0.016	2	Did not advance									
Jaturong Niwanti	Keirin	—N/a		Did not finish R		Did not finish	6	Did not advance									
Jaturong Niwanti	Sprint	10.305	16 Q	+0.094	2 R	+0.091	2	Did not advance									
Thak Kaeonoi	Omnium	—N/a														54	12
Thak Kaeonoi; Yuttana Mano	Madison	—N/a														Did not finish	10
Jai Angsuthasawit; Jaturong Niwanti; Wachirawit Saenkhamwong; Wiriya Yapa	Team sprint	46.139	9	Did not advance													

==== Women ====
Athlete	Event	Qualifying		First Round / Round of 16				Round of 8				Quarterfinals		Semifinals		Finals / BM / Pl.	
Athlete	Event	Time	Rank	Time	Rank	Repechage	Rank	Time	Rank	Repechage	Rank	Time	Rank	Time	Rank	Time/Score	Rank
Pannaray Rasee	Keirin	—N/a		+0.373	5 R	+0.066	2 Q	—N/a						+0.450	5 Qf	+0.089	9
Pannaray Rasee	Sprint	11.496	12 Q	+0.016	2 R	11.755	1 Q	+0.069	2 R	11.666	1 Q	+0.119 +0.153	2 Qf	Did not advance		+0.158	8
Natthaporn Aphimot	Keirin	—N/a		+0.953	4 R	+0.329	3 Q	—N/a						+0.629	5 Qf	+0.251	10
Yaowaret Jitmat	Sprint	11.581	14 Q	+1.403	2 R	+0.135	2	Did not advance									
Chaniporn Batriya	Omnium	—N/a														47	9
Natthaporn Aphimot; Yaowaret Jitmat; Pannaray Rasee	Team sprint	51.927	6	50.881	6	Did not advance											

== Dragon boat ==
Men

Event	Heats		Semifinals		Minor Final		Grand Final	
Event	Time	Rank	Time	Rank	Time	Rank	Time	Rank
Men's 200 metres	48.099	1 GF	—N/a				49.171	2nd place, silver medalist(s)
Men's 500 metres	2:10.933	2 SF	2:12.422	1 GF	—N/a		2:09.822	3rd place, bronze medalist(s)
Men's 1000 metres	4:32.528	2 SF	4:40.481	2 MF	4:40.952	2	—N/a	8

Women

Event	Heats		Semifinal		Grand Final	
Event	Time	Rank	Time	Rank	Time	Rank
Women's 200 metres	51.740	2 qF	—N/a		55.200	3rd place, bronze medalist(s)
Women's 500 metres	2:25.064	3 SF	2:24.884	3 GF	2:26.400	4
Women's 1000 metres	5:41.499	4 SF	5:13.767	3 GF	4:59.082	5

== Equestrian ==
=== Dressage ===
Rider	Horse	PSG score	Rank	Inter I score	Rank	Inter I Freestyle score	Individual Rank	Team Rank
Supasin Kongpun	Belcanto	66.883	15 Q	67.324	12 Q	71.670	5	5
Chanjanok Klara Ruecker	Vincent 186	65.647	20 Q	65.441	14 Q	66.175	11	5
H.R.H. Sirivannavari	Es Fangar's Samba King	61.588	25 Q	59.618	25	—N/a		5
Pawarisa Thongpradup	Generaal	~~EL~~	–	—N/a				5
Team total		194.118	—N/a					5

=== Eventing ===
Rider	Horse	Dressage		Cross country		After cross country		Jumping		Total Pen.	Team rank
Rider	Horse	Pen.	Individual Rank	J/Pen.	T/Pen.	Pen.	Individual Rank	J/Pen.	T/Pen.	Total Pen.	Team rank
Korntawat Samran	Billy Elmy	27.90	3	0.00	–	27.90	2nd place, silver medalist(s)	–	–	27.90	3rd place, bronze medalist(s)
Preecha Khunjan	Clair De Lune Blanc RW	34.20	18	0.00	–	34.20	12	–	–	34.20	3rd place, bronze medalist(s)
Weerapat Pitakanonda	Carnival March	31.80	14	0.00	–	31.80	10	–	–	31.80	3rd place, bronze medalist(s)
Supap Khawngam	Canadian Club M	32.20	15	11.00	–	43.20	17	–	–	~~43.20~~	3rd place, bronze medalist(s)
Total										93.90	3rd place, bronze medalist(s)

== Fencing ==
=== Men ===
Individual

Athlete	Event	Preliminaries		Round of 32	Round of 16	Quarterfinals	Semifinals	Final	
Athlete	Event	Opposition Results	Rank	Opposition Result	Opposition Result	Opposition Result	Opposition Result	Opposition Result	Rank
Chinnaphat Chaloemchanen	Épée	Abbas Mohsin (IRQ): W 5–2; Javokhirbek Nurmatov (UZB): L 2–3; Ho Wai Hang (HKG): L 2–5; Ilim Bakytbek Uulu (KGZ): W 3–2; Tsoggerel Jigjidsuren (MGL): W 5–4; Ruslan Kurbanov (KAZ): L 0–5	16 Q	Akira Komata (JPN); L 8–15	Did not advance				18
Nattiphong Singkham	Épée	Khalifah Al-Omairi (KSA): L 3–5; Arval Sundara (INA): W 5–2; Elmir Alimzhanov (KAZ): L 4–5; Abdulaziz Al-Shatti (KUW): W 5–4; Yu Lefan (CHN): L 1–5	20 Q	Nguyễn Phước Đến (VIE); L 10–15	Did not advance				21
Ratchanavi Deejing	Foil	Chen Chih-chieh (TPE): L 0–5; Mukhammad Asranov (UZB): W 5–3; Nguyễn Minh Quang (VIE): W 5–1; Cheung Ka Long (HKG): L 4–5	15 Q	Philippe Wakim (LBN); L 12–15	Did not advance				18
Notethakod Wangpaisit	Foil	Sammuel Tranquilan (PHI): L 2–5; Ali Abbas (KUW): W 5–3; Lee Kwang-hyun (KOR): L 2–5; Xu Jie (CHN): L 1–5; Abdalla Khalifa (QAT): L 3–5	25	Did not advance					25
Voragun Srinualnad	Sabre	Vũ Thành An (VIE): L 1–5; Mohammed Alamr (KSA): W 5–4; Gu Bon-gil (KOR): L 1–5; Mohammad Rahbari (IRI): L 2–5; Abdallah Tahla (JOR): W 5–3; Musa Aymuratov (UZB): L 3–5	20 Q	Sze Long Aaron Ho (HKG); L 9–15	Did not advance				20
Panachai Wiriyatangsakul	Sabre	Shen Chenpeng (CHN): L 2–5; Kento Yoshida (JPN): L 3–5; Osama Almasri (JOR): L 2–5; Yousiff Alshamlan (KUW): L 2–5; Nazarbay Sattarkhan (KAZ): L 1–5	24	Did not advance					24

Team

Athlete(s)	Event	Round of 16	Quarterfinals	Semifinals	Final	
Athlete(s)	Event	Opposition Result	Opposition Result	Opposition Result	Opposition Result	Rank
Nattiphong Singkham; Chinnaphat Chaloemchanen; Korakote Juengamnuaychai; Jadsadaporn Puengkuntod	Épée	Saudi Arabia (KSA); L 28–45	Did not advance			10
Notethakod Wangpaisit; Ratchanavi Deejing; Bhumrapee Panyabaramee	Foil	Uzbekistan (UZB); L 26–45	Did not advance			10
Kanisorn Pangmoon; Voragun Srinualnad; Panachai Wiriyatangsakul	Sabre	Hong Kong (HKG); L 31–45	Did not advance			11

=== Women ===
Individual

Athlete	Event	Preliminaries		Round of 32	Round of 16	Quarterfinals	Semifinals	Final	
Athlete	Event	Opposition Results	Rank	Opposition Result	Opposition Result	Opposition Result	Opposition Result	Opposition Result	Rank
Pacharaporn; Vasanasomsithi	Épée	Sun Yiwen (CHN): L 1–5; Zainab Alhosani (UAE): W 5–1; Dina Mansi (JOR): L 2–4; Shakhzoda Egamberdieva (UZB): L 2–5; Kiria Abdul Rahman (SGP): L 3–5	22 Q	Dilnaz Murzataeva (UZB); L 6–15	Did not advance				22
Korawan Thanee	Épée	Choi In-jeong (KOR): L 3–5; Dilnaz Murzataeva (UZB): L 1–5; Shaikha Alzaabi (UAE): W 5–3; Monika Men (CAM): W 5–3; Miho Yoshimura (JPN): L 3–5	18 Q	Kiria Abdul Rahman (SGP); L 7–15	Did not advance				18
Chayada Smithisukul	Foil	Roaa Majali (JOR): W 5–4; Sera Azuma (JPN): L 1–5; Nok Sze Daphne Chan (HKG): L 0–5; Mandira Thapa (NEP): W 5–3; Ku Hio Lam (MAC): L 1–5; Hong Hyo-jin (KOR): W 5–3	14 Q	—N/a	Huang Qianqian (CHN); L 7–15	Did not advance			15
Chayanutphat; Shinnakerdchoke	Foil	Alhayam Alblooshi (UAE): W 5–2; Goma Acharya (NEP): W 5–1; Hong Se-na (KOR): W 5–4; Huang Qianqian (CHN): L 0–5; Yuka Ueno (JPN): L 0–5; Maxine Jie Xin Wong (SGP): L 1–5	13 Q	—N/a	Yuka Ueno (JPN); L 4–15	Did not advance			14
Tonkhaw Phokaew	Sabre	Aigerim Sarybay (KAZ): L 2–5; Shao Yaqi (CHN): L 4–5; Jylyn Nicanor (PHI): W 5–4; Seri Ozaki (JPN): L 2–5	17 Q	Jylyn Nicanor (PHI); W 15–7	C. A. Bhavani Devi (IND); L 9–15	Did not advance			16
Bandhita Srinualnad	Sabre	Fatema Mujib (BAN): W 5–4; Jessica Shu Hui Ong (SGP): L 1–5; Yang Hengyu (CHN): L 3–5; Jeon Eun-hye (KOR): L 4–5; Au Sin Ying (HKG): W 4–5	15 Q	Bye	Yang Hengyu (CHN); L 10–15	Did not advance			15

Team

Athlete(s)	Event	Round of 16	Quarterfinals	Semifinals	Final	
Athlete(s)	Event	Opposition Result	Opposition Result	Opposition Result	Opposition Result	Rank
Pacharaporn Vasanasomsithi; Korawan Thanee; Warisa Winya; Sasiporn Poonket	Épée	Singapore (SGP); L 32–45	Did not advance			10
Chayada Smithisukul; Chayanutphat Shinnakerdchoke; Sasinpat Doungpattra; Naramol Longthong	Foil	—N/a	Hong Kong (HKG); L 15–45	Did not advance		7
Tonkhaw Phokaew; Poonyanuch Pithakduangkamol; Bandhita Srinualnad; Onwipha Innurak	Sabre	Saudi Arabia (KSA); W 45–27	China (CHN); L 26–45	Did not advance		8

== Field hockey ==
Key:

- A.E.T – After extra time.
- P – Match decided by penalty-shootout.

Team	Event	Group Stage						Quarterfinal	Semifinal	Final / BM / Pl.	
Team	Event	Opposition Score	Opposition Score	Opposition Score	Opposition Score	Opposition Score	Rank	Opposition Score	Opposition Score	Opposition Score	Rank
Thailand men's	Men's tournament	Malaysia; L 0–9	South Korea; L 0–10	Oman; L 3–5	China; L 0–9	Indonesia; L 0–2	6	Did not advance		Singapore; W 3–2	11
Thailand women's	Women's tournament	—N/a	Kazakhstan; W 4–0	Japan; L 0–14	Indonesia; W 3–0	China; L 0–12	3	Did not advance		Malaysia; L 1–2	6

== Football ==
Team	Event	Group stage				Round of 16	Quarterfinal	Semi-final	Final / BM	
Team	Event	Opposition Score	Opposition Score	Opposition Score	Rank	Opposition Score	Opposition Score	Opposition Score	Opposition Score	Rank
Thailand men's	Men's tournament	Bahrain; D 1–1	South Korea; L 0–4	Kuwait; D 1–1	3 Q	Iran; L 0–2	Did not advance			14
Thailand women's	Women's tournament	—N/a	India; W 1–0	Chinese Taipei; L 0–1	2 Q	—N/a	China; L 0–4	Did not advance		8

== Golf ==
=== Men ===
Athlete	Event	Round 1	Round 2	Round 3	Round 4	Total		
Athlete	Event	Score	Score	Score	Score	Score	Par	Rank
Atiruj Winaicharoenchai	Individual	67	63	67	76	273	–15	10
Danthai Boonma	Individual	70	70	71	65	276	–12	17
Poom Saksansin	Individual	66	71	68	71	276	–12	17
Phachara Khongwatmai	Individual	64	71	68	73	276	–12	17
Atiruj Winaicharoenchai; Danthai Boonma; Poom Saksansin; Phachara Khongwatmai	Team	197	204	203	209	813	–51	2nd place, silver medalist(s)

=== Women ===
Athlete	Event	Round 1	Round 2	Round 3	Round 4	Total		
Athlete	Event	Score	Score	Score	Score	Score	Par	Rank
Arpichaya Yubol	Individual	67	65	69	68	269	–19	1st place, gold medalist(s)
Patcharajutar Kongkraphan	Individual	69	67	70	70	276	–12	5
Eila Galitsky	Individual	69	70	67	73	279	–9	7
Arpichaya Yubol; Patcharajutar Kongkraphan; Eila Galitsky	Team	136	132	136	138	542	–34	1st place, gold medalist(s)

== Gymnastics ==
=== Artistic ===
Men

Athlete	Event	Qualification		Final	
Athlete	Event	Score	Rank	Score	Rank
Witsawayot Saroj; Weerapat Chuaisom; Ittirit Kumsiriratn; Suphacheep Baobenmad; Tikamporn Surintornta	Team	—N/a		217.362	7
Suphacheep Baobenmad	Individual all-around	71.298	16 Q	73.397	16
Suphacheep Baobenmad	Floor	11.600	32	Did not advance	
Suphacheep Baobenmad	Pommel horse	10.000	33	Did not advance	
Suphacheep Baobenmad	Rings	11.766	29	Did not advance	
Suphacheep Baobenmad	Vault	13.900	23	Did not advance	
Suphacheep Baobenmad	Parallel bars	12.266	31	Did not advance	
Suphacheep Baobenmad	Horizontal bar	11.766	26	Did not advance	
Ittirit Kumsiriratn	Individual all-around	66.364	19 Q	64.898	18
Ittirit Kumsiriratn	Floor	12.700	24	Did not advance	
Ittirit Kumsiriratn	Pommel horse	9.600	34	Did not advance	
Ittirit Kumsiriratn	Rings	11.666	32	Did not advance	
Ittirit Kumsiriratn	Vault	13.566	32	Did not advance	
Ittirit Kumsiriratn	Parallel bars	11.466	34	Did not advance	
Ittirit Kumsiriratn	Horizontal bar	7.366	36	Did not advance	
Witsawayot Saroj	Individual all-around	48.766	21	Did not advance	
Witsawayot Saroj	Floor	11.400	35	Did not advance	
Witsawayot Saroj	Pommel horse	3.500	40	Did not advance	
Witsawayot Saroj	Rings	11.700	31	Did not advance	
Witsawayot Saroj	Vault	0.000	44	Did not advance	
Witsawayot Saroj	Parallel bars	11.700	33	Did not advance	
Witsawayot Saroj	Horizontal bar	10.466	33	Did not advance	
Tikamporn Surintornta	Floor	14.400	4 Q	13.966	5
Tikamporn Surintornta	Rings	12.800	20	Did not advance	
Tikamporn Surintornta	Vault	14.283	5 Q	14.100	5
Weerapat Chuaisom	Pommel horse	10.033	32	Did not advance	
Weerapat Chuaisom	Parallel bars	12.300	29	Did not advance	
Weerapat Chuaisom	Horizontal bar	12.466	16	Did not advance	

Women

Athlete	Event	Qualification		Final	
Athlete	Event	Score	Rank	Score	Rank
Ananya Patanakul; Thantida Ruecker; Sasiwimon Mueangphuan	Team	—N/a		123.994	8
Ananya Patanakul	Individual all-around	42.331	26 Q	43.965	15
Ananya Patanakul	Vault	12.366	24	Did not advance	
Ananya Patanakul	Uneven bars	9.433	29	Did not advance	
Ananya Patanakul	Balance beam	9.066	34	Did not advance	
Ananya Patanakul	Floor	11.466	26	Did not advance	
Sasiwimon Mueangphuan	Individual all-around	44.264	22 Q	45.732	11
Sasiwimon Mueangphuan	Vault	11.866	31	Did not advance	
Sasiwimon Mueangphuan	Uneven bars	8.966	31	Did not advance	
Sasiwimon Mueangphuan	Balance beam	10.966	29	Did not advance	
Sasiwimon Mueangphuan	Floor	12.466	14	Did not advance	
Thantida Ruecker	Individual all-around	37.399	28	Did not advance	
Thantida Ruecker	Vault	11.433	35	Did not advance	
Thantida Ruecker	Uneven bars	7.266	34	Did not advance	
Thantida Ruecker	Balance beam	8.300	36	Did not advance	
Thantida Ruecker	Floor	10.400	33	Did not advance	

== Mind sports – Esports ==
=== Individual ===
Athlete	Event	Round of 32	WB / LB Round 1	WB / LB Round 2	WB / LB Round 3	LB Round 4	LB Round 5	LB Round 6	LB Round 7	WB / LB Final	Final	
Athlete	Event	Opposition Score	Opposition Score	Opposition Score	Opposition Score	Opposition Score	Opposition Score	Opposition Score	Opposition Score	Opposition Score	Opposition Score	Rank
Teedech Songsaisakul	EA Sports FC Online	Tong Hang Sam (MAC); W 2–0	Ali Alhammadi (UAE); W 2–0	Fan Cheuk Wa (HKG); W 2–0	Hồ Gia Huy (VIE); W 2–0	—N/a				Kwak Jun-hyouk (KOR); W 2–1	Phatanasak Varanan (THA); W 2–0	1st place, gold medalist(s)
Phatanasak Varanan	EA Sports FC Online	Manuchekhr Benazirzoda (TJK); W 2–0	Trương Đức Hiếu (VIE); W 2–0	Nurbakyt Mirgali (KAZ); W 2–0	Kwak Jun-hyouk (KOR); L 0–2	—N/a		Mohammad Ega Rahmaditya (INA); W 2–0	Park Ki-young (KOR); W 2–0	Kwak Jun-hyouk (KOR); W 2–1	Teedech Songsaisakul (THA); L 0–2	2nd place, silver medalist(s)
Sitta Chantasriviroje	Street Fighter V	Ross Jhan Villarin (PHI); W 2–0	Huỳnh Thoại Chương (VIE); L 0–2	Ross Jhan Villarin (PHI); W 2–1	Wong Yuk Cheung (HKG); L 1–2	Did not advance						
Thum Homchuen	Street Fighter V	Jerry Cheong (MAS); L 1–2	Rashid Alawadhi (UAE); L 1–2	Did not advance								

=== Team ===
Athlete	Event	Group Stage		Quarterfinal		Semifinal		Final / BM	
Athlete	Event	Opposition Score(s) / Time	Rank	Opposition Score / Time	Rank	Opposition Score / Time	Rank	Opposition Score / Time	Rank
Vatcharanan Thaworn; Anusak Manpdong; Kawee Wachiraphas; Sorawat Boonphrom; Chayut Suebka	Arena of Valor	Philippines (PHI); W 1–0	1 Q	Nepal (NEP); W 2–0	—N/a	China (CHN); L 0–2	—N/a	Vietnam (VIE); W 2–0	3rd place, bronze medalist(s)
Walunchai Sukarin; Attakit Samattakitwanich; Teerapat Supasdetch; Chatchapon Chanthorn; Pachara Thongeiam; Werit Popan	Dream Three Kingdoms 2	Bye		Kazakhstan (KAZ); W 2–0	—N/a	Hong Kong (HKG); L 0–2	—N/a	Vietnam (VIE); W 2–0	3rd place, bronze medalist(s)
Supanut Chow; Karn Janmanee; Natthaphon Ouanphakdee; Anurat Praianun; Thanathorn Sriiamkoon; Poomipat Trisiripanit	Dota 2	Indonesia (INA): W 1–0; Hong Kong (HKG): W 1–0	1 Q	China (CHN); L 0–2	—N/a	Did not advance			
Phumiphat Boonta; Nutthanon Bumrungchawkasem; Karun Changpu; Chirapat Eyesong; Nut Palanan; Chayutphong Sukkamart	League of Legends	Macau (MAC); L 0–1	2	Did not advance					
Supachai Singkaew; Nuttawut Muensa; Sikarin Nopparat; Natchaphon Somtus; Purin Rongkhankaew	Peacekeeper Elite	Bye		South Korea (KOR); Myanmar (MYA); Philippines (PHI); 00:53:30.286	2 Q	China (CHN); Indonesia (INA); Hong Kong (HKG); 00:55:36.736	3	Did not advance	

== Sepak takraw ==
=== Men ===
Athlete	Event	Preliminary round				Semifinal	Final	
Athlete	Event	Opposition Score	Opposition Score	Opposition Score	Rank	Opposition Score	Opposition Score	Rank
Jirasak Pakbuangoen; Pattarapong Yupadee; Poottipong Pukdee; Pornchai Kaokaew; Siriwat Sakha	Regu	India; W 2–0	Myanmar; W 2–0	Philippines; W 2–0	1 Q	Vietnam; W 2–0	Malaysia; W 2–0	1st place, gold medalist(s)
Siriwat Sakha; Thawisak Thongsai; Pattarapong Yupadee; Rachan Viphan; Pornthep Tinbangbon; Sittipong Khamchan; Varayut Jantarasena; Wichan Temkort; Kritsanapong Nontakote; Pichet Pansan; Tanaphon Sapyen; Marukin Phanmakon	Team regu	Laos; W 3–0	Japan; W 3–0	—N/a	1 Q	South Korea; W 2–0	Malaysia; W 2–0	1st place, gold medalist(s)

=== Women ===
Athlete	Event	Preliminary round			Semifinal	Final	
Athlete	Event	Opposition Score	Opposition Score	Rank	Opposition Score	Opposition Score	Rank
Manlika Bunthod; Primprapha Kaewkhamsai; Sirinan Khiaopak; Wassana Soiraya; Wiphada Chitphuan	Regu	South Korea; W 2–0	Myanmar; W 2–0	1 Q	India; W 2–0	Vietnam; W 2–0	1st place, gold medalist(s)
Kaewjai Pumsawangkaew; Manlika Bunthod; Masaya Duangsri; Nipaporn Salupphon; Primprapha Kaewkhamsai; Pruksa Maneewong; Ratsamee Thongsod; Sirinan Khiaopak; Somruedee Pruepruk; Usa Srikhamlue; Wassana Soiraya; Wiphada Chitphuan	Team regu	Indonesia; W 3–0	Japan; W 3–0	1 Q	Laos; W 2–0	South Korea; W 2–0	1st place, gold medalist(s)

== Sport climbing ==
Speed

Athlete	Event	Qualification		Round of 16	Quarter-finals	Semi-finals	Final / BM	
Athlete	Event	Best	Rank	Opposition Time	Opposition Time	Opposition Time	Opposition Time	Rank
Sirapob Jirajaturapak	Men's	6.667	17	Did not advance				
Aphiwit Limpanichpakdee	Men's	5.629	10 Q	Omasa (JPN); L 6.243–5.325	Did not advance			
Narada Disyabut	Women's	8.718	12 Q	Ulzhabaeva (KAZ); W 8.314–8.825	Niu (CHN); L 10.725–7.696	Did not advance		
Pratthana Raksachat	Women's	8.643	10 Q	Hayashi (JPN); L 9.267–7.654	Did not advance			

Speed relay

Athlete	Event	Qualification		Quarter-finals	Semi-finals	Final / BM	
Athlete	Event	Time	Rank	Opposition Time	Opposition Time	Opposition Time	Rank
Phanuphong Bunprakop; Sirapob Jirajaturapak; Aphiwit Limpanichpakdee; Thatthana Raksachat	Men's	20.484	7 Q	China (CHN); L 20.923–19.144	Did not advance		
Nalat Disyabut; Napat Disyabut; Jiraporn Kaitwatcharachai; Pratthana Raksachat	Women's	29.970	5	—N/a	Did not advance		

Combined

Athlete	Event	Qualification				Semi-finals				Final			
Athlete	Event	Boulder Point	Lead Point	Total	Rank	Boulder Point	Lead Point	Total	Rank	Boulder Point	Lead Point	Total	Rank
Teeraphon Boondech	Men's	69.2	30	99.2	12 Q	24.7	26.1	50.8	12	Did not advance			
Winai Ruangrit	Men's	44.6	14	58.6	17 Q	14.9	10.1	25.0	19	Did not advance			
Puntarika Tunyavanich	Women's	60	7.1	67.1	11 Q	12.66	14.1	26.76	13	Cancelled (Note: The women's boulder and lead final has been cancelled due to rain and safety of the athletes. The semi-finals result would be used as final result.)			

== Table tennis ==
=== Singles ===
Athlete	Event	Round of 64	Round of 32	Round of 16	Quarterfinal	Semifinal	Final	
Athlete	Event	Opposition Score	Opposition Score	Opposition Score	Opposition Score	Opposition Score	Opposition Score	Rank
Napat Thanmathikom	Men's	Bye	Wang Chuqin (CHN); L 0–4	Did not advance				
Sitisak Nuchchart	Men's	Nguyen Anh Tu (VIE); W 4–3	Chuang Chih-Yuan (TPE); L 0–4	Did not advance				
Orawan Paranang	Women's	Bye	Undram Munkhbat (MGL); W 4–0	Sun Yingsha (CHN); L 0–4	Did not advance			
Suthasini Sawettabut	Women's	Bye	Maryam Abdulla Alaali (BRN); W 4–0	Manika Batra (IND); L 2–4	Did not advance			

=== Doubles ===
Athlete	Event	Round of 64	Round of 32	Round of 16	Quarterfinal	Semifinal	Final	
Athlete	Event	Opposition Score	Opposition Score	Opposition Score	Opposition Score	Opposition Score	Opposition Score	Rank
Sarayut Tancharoen; Padasak Tanviriyavechakul	Men's	Bye	Nima Darounkolaei / Noshad Daronkolaei (IRI); L 0–3	Did not advance				
Sitisak Nuchchart; Napat Thanmathikom	Men's	Manush Shah / Manav Thakkar (IND); L 2–3	Did not advance					
Orawan Paranang; Suthasini Sawettabut	Women's	—N/a	Jeon Ji-hee / Shin Yu-bin (KOR); L 0–3	Did not advance				
Wanwisa Aueawiriyayothin; Jinnipa Sawettabut	Women's	—N/a	Nguyen Khoa Dieu Khanh / Nguyen Thuy Kieu My (VIE); W 3–0	Sutirtha Mukherjee / Ayhika Mukherjee (IND); L 0–3	Did not advance			
Napat Thanmathikom; Suthasini Sawettabut	Mixed	Bye	Sathiyan Gnanasekaran / Manika Batra (IND); L 1–3	Did not advance				
Phakpoom Sanguansin; Orawan Paranang	Mixed	Bye	Lin Yun-Ju / Chen Szu-Yu (TPE); W 3–0	Harmeet Desai / Sreeja Akula (IND); W 3–0	Jang Woo-jin / Jeon Ji-hee (KOR); L 0–3	Did not advance		

=== Team ===
Athlete	Event	Group stage				Round of 16	Quarter-finals	Semifinals	Final	Rank
Athlete	Event	Opposition Score	Opposition Score	Opposition Score	Rank	Opposition Score	Opposition Score	Opposition Score	Opposition Score	Rank
Sarayut Tancharoen; Phakpoom Sanguansin; Sitisak Nuchchart; Napat Thanmathikom; Padasak Tanviriyavechakul	Men's team	South Korea (KOR); L 3–0	Macau (MAC); W 3–1	—N/a	2 Q	Singapore (SIN); L 0–3	Did not advance			
Suthasini Sawettabut; Orawan Paranang; Tamolwan Khetkhuan; Jinnipa Sawettabut; Wanwisa Aueawiriyayothin	Women's Team	South Korea (KOR); L 0–3	Pakistan (PAK); W 3–0	—N/a	2 Q	India (IND); W 3–2	North Korea (PRK); W 3–2	China (CHN); L 0–3	Did not advance	3rd place, bronze medalist(s)

== Taekwondo ==
=== Kyorugi ===
Athlete	Event	Round of 32	Round of 16	Quarterfinal	Semifinal	Final	
Athlete	Event	Opposition Score	Opposition Score	Opposition Score	Opposition Score	Opposition Score	Rank
Thanakrit Yodrak	Men's −58 kg	Kou (MAC); W 2–0	Cheng (CHN); L 0–2	Did not advance			
Banlung Tubtimdang	Men's −63 kg	Bye	Ale (NEP); W 2–0	Hsu H-Y (TPE); W 2–1	Liang (CHN); W 2–0	Hosseinpour (IRI); W 2–0	1st place, gold medalist(s)
Chaichon Cho	Men's −68 kg	Bye	Alcantara (PHI); L 0–2	Did not advance			
Jack Woody Mercer	Men's −80 kg	Bye	Pham (VIE); W 2–0	Park W-h (KOR); L 0–2	Did not advance		
Panipak Wongpattanakit	Women's −49 kg	Bye	Tamang (NEP); W 2–0	Jhuang T-Y (TPE); W 2–0	Mannopova (UZB); W 2–0	Gao (CHN); W 2–1	1st place, gold medalist(s)
Chutikan Jongkolrattanawattana	Women's −53 kg	Moe Myint (MYA); W 2–0	Kiyanichandeh (IRI); W 2–1	Maheswari MT (INA); W 2–0	Park H-j (KOR); L 0–2	Did not advance	3rd place, bronze medalist(s)
Phannapa Harnsujin	Women's −57 kg	—N/a	Briones (PHI); W 2–0	Aoun (LBN); W 2–1	Lo C-l (TPE); L 0–2	Did not advance	3rd place, bronze medalist(s)
Sasikarn Tongchan	Women's −67 kg	—N/a	Sadikova (UZB); L 0–2	Did not advance			

=== Poomsae ===
Athlete	Event	Round of 16	Quarterfinal	Semifinal	Final	
Athlete	Event	Opposition Score	Opposition Score	Opposition Score	Opposition Score	Rank
Nuttapat Kaewkan	Men's individual	Yap ZHD (SGP); W 7.67–7.62	Kang W-j (KOR); L 7.54–7.81	Did not advance		
Pichamon Limpaiboon	Women's individual	Chen H-Y (TPE); L 7.63–7.68	Did not advance			

== Tennis – Lawn tennis ==
Athlete	Event	Round of 64	Round of 32	Round of 16	Quarter-finals	Semi-finals	Final	
Athlete	Event	Opposition Score	Opposition Score	Opposition Score	Opposition Score	Opposition Score	Opposition Score	Rank
Palaphoom Kovapitukted	Men's singles	Alharrasi (QAT); L 5–7, 0–0^{r}	Did not advance					
Kasidit Samrej	Men's singles	Qabazard (KUW); W 6–1, 6–4	Kwon (KOR); W 6–3, 5–7, 6–4	Sultanov (UZB); L 4–6, 2–6	Did not advance			
Lanlana Tararudee	Women's singles	Bye	Lau (MAC); W 6–2, 6–0	Okamura (JPN); L 6–4, 4–6, 4–6	Did not advance			
Mananchaya Sawangkaew	Women's singles	Bye	Bista (NEP); W 6–0, 6–0	Han (KOR); L 6–1, 2–6, 5–7	Did not advance			
Pruchya Isaro; Maximus Jones	Men's doubles	—N/a	Baatar / Sukhbaatar (MGL); W 6–0, 6–1	Barki / Rungkat (INA); W 6–3, 4–6, [10–7]	Nam / Song (KOR); W 6–4, 3–6, [10–7]	Hsu / Jung (TPE); L 6–4, 6–7^{(5–7)}, [2–10]	Did not advance	3rd place, bronze medalist(s)
Thantub Suksumrarn; Wishaya Trongcharoenchaikul	Men's doubles	—N/a	Alcantara / Gonzales (PHI); W 4–6, 6–4, [10–5]	Hong / Kwon (KOR); L 3–6, 3–6	Did not advance			
Anchisa Chanta; Punnin Kovapitukted	Women's doubles	—N/a	Karunaratne / Wu (HKG); W 6–4, 6–0	Raina / Thombare (IND); W 7–5, 6–2	Lee / Liang (TPE); L 6–7^{(3–7)}, 3–6	Did not advance		
Luksika Kumkhum; Peangtarn Plipuech	Women's doubles	—N/a	Bye	Sutjiadi / Tjen (INA); L 6–7^{(4–7)}, 3–6	Did not advance			
Luksika Kumkhum; Maximus Jones	Mixed doubles	Bye	Lý-Nguyễn / Nguyễn (VIE); W 6–4, 6–1	Kobori / Uesugi (JPN); W 6–2, 2–6, [10–7]	Eala / Alcantara (PHI); L 4–6, 4–6	Did not advance		
Peangtarn Plipuech; Pruchya Isaro	Mixed doubles	Bye	Suhail / Qureshi (PAK); W 6–4, 6–1	Sutjiadi / Rungkat (INA); L 2–6, 7–5, [5–10]	Did not advance			

== Volleyball ==
=== Beach volleyball ===
Athlete(s)	Event	Preliminary round	Rank	Round of 16	Quarterfinals	Semifinals	Final / BM	
Athlete(s)	Event	Opposition Score	Rank	Opposition Score	Opposition Score	Opposition Score	Opposition Score	Rank
Poravid Taovato; Pithak Tipjan	Men's	Pool C Takahashi – Ageba (JPN); W 2 – 0 (21–14, 21–16); Wong – Lam (HKG); W 2 – 0 (21–14, 21–12)	1 Q	Aldash – Gurin (KAZ); L 1 – 2 (13–21, 21–19, 12–15)	Did not advance			9
Dunwinit Kaewsai; Surin Jongklang	Men's	Pool D Ashfiya – Akbar (INA); L 1 – 2 (22–20, 12–21, 11–15); Al-Najjar – Al-Qishawi (PLE); W 2 – 0 (21–12, 21–19)	2 Q	Pourasgari – Aghajanighasab (IRI); L 0 – 2 (15–21, 15–21)	Did not advance			9
Taravadee; Naraphornrapat; Worapeerachaya; Kongphopsarutawadee	Women's	Pool B Tam – Lei (MAC); W 2 – 0 (21–8, 21–10); Wong – To (HKG); W 2 – 0 (21–15, 21–17); Juliana – Ratnasari (INA); W 2 – 0 (21–18, 21–15); Progella – Matibag (PHI); W 2 – 0 (21–0, 21–0)	1 Q	Deepika – Chathurika (SRI); W 2 – 0 (21–10, 21–10)	Phirachayankrailert – Patcharamainaruebhorn (THA); W 2 – 0 (21–14, 21–7)	Ishii – Mizoe (JPN); L 1 – 2 (21–16, 14–21, 13–15)	Wang – Dong (CHN); L 0 – 2 (15–21, 19–21)	4
Woranatchayakorn; Phirachayankrailert; Charanrutwad; Patcharamainaruebhorn	Women's	Pool C Lee – Jeon (KOR); W 2 – 0 (21–15, 21–11); Ishii – Mizoe (JPN); L 0 – 2 (11–21, 14–21); Leong – Law (MAC); W 2 – 0 (21–11, 26–24); Yuen – Lo (HKG); W 2 – 1 (21–17, 18–21, 15–11)	2 Q	Progella – Matibag (PHI); W 2 – 0 (21–16, 25–23)	Naraphornrapat – Kongphopsarutawadee (THA); L 0 – 2 (14–21, 7–21)	Did not advance		5

=== Indoor volleyball ===
Men

Team	Event	Group stage			Round of 12	Semifinal / Pl.	Final / BM / Pl.	
Team	Event	Opposition Score	Opposition Score	Rank	Opposition Score	Opposition Score	Opposition Score	Rank
Thailand men's	Men's tournament	Hong Kong; W 3–0	Qatar; L 1–3	2 Q	Iran; L 0–3	South Korea; L 1–3	Kazakhstan; L 0–3	10

Women

Team	Event	First round			Second round			Semifinal / Pl.	Final / BM / Pl.	
Team	Event	Opposition Score	Opposition Score	Rank	Opposition Score	Opposition Score	Rank	Opposition Score	Opposition Score	Rank
Thailand women's	Women's tournament	Chinese Taipei; W 3–1	Mongolia; W 3–0	1 Q	Kazakhstan; W 3–0	Japan; L 0–3	2 Q	China; L 0–3	Vietnam; W 3–0	3rd place, bronze medalist(s)

== Wushu ==
=== Taolu ===
Athlete	Event	Event 1		Event 2		Total	Rank
Athlete	Event	Result	Rank	Result	Rank	Total	Rank
Weerachat Koolsalwatatmongkol	Men's changquan	9.470	9	—N/a		9.470	9
Pitaya Yangrungrawin	Men's nanquan and nangun	9.660	12	9.556	14	19.216	12
Wanchai Yodyinghathaikun	Men's nanquan and nangun	9.113	16	8.396	19	17.509	19
Katisak Goolsawadmongkol	Men's taijiquan and taijijian	9.696	14	8.850	18	18.546	16
Jo Saelee	Men's taijiquan and taijijian	9.600	16	9.686	9	19.286	11
Naphalai Saeyang	Women's changquan	8.150	10	—N/a		8.150	10

=== Sanda ===
Athlete	Event	Round of 16	Quarter-finals	Semi-finals	Final	
Athlete	Event	Opposition Score	Opposition Score	Opposition Score	Opposition Score	Rank
Thongchai Huanak	Men's –56 kg	Ku (MAC); W 2–0	Amanbekov (KGZ); L 0–2	Did not advance		
Ausma Pengthai	Men's –60 kg	Padua (PHI); L 0–2	Did not advance			
Chanachai Kamolklang	Men's –65 kg	Ghushry (NEP); W 2–0	Jeon (KOR); L KO	Did not advance		
Thotsaphon Saophanao	Men's –75 kg	Bye	Habibi (AFG); L 0–2	Did not advance		
