= Gymnastics at the 2022 Asian Games – Women's balance beam =

Women's balance beam at the 2022 Asian Games
- Venue: Huanglong Gymnasium
- Date: 25–29 September 2023
- Competitors: 36 from 12 nations

Medalists
gold medal	Mana Okamura	Japan
silver medal	Tang Xijing	China
bronze medal	Ting Hua-tien	Chinese Taipei

The women's balance beam competition at the 2022 Asian Games took place on 25 and 29 September 2023 at Huanglong Sports Centre Gymnasium.

== Schedule ==
All times are China Standard Time (UTC+08:00)

Date	Time	Event
Monday, 25 September 2023	10:00	Qualification
Friday, 29 September 2023	15:06	Final

== Results ==
=== Qualification ===
Rank	Athlete	Score
1	Ting Hua-tien (TPE)	13.866
2	Zhang Jin (CHN)	13.600
3	Mana Okamura (JPN)	13.366
4	Misaki Masui (JPN)	13.266
5	Kim Su-jong (PRK)	13.166
6	Kim Son-hyang (PRK)	13.100
7	Tang Xijing (CHN)	12.833
8	Zuo Tong (CHN)	12.733
9	Nadine Joy Nathan (SGP)	12.600
10	Zhang Xinyi (CHN)	12.500
11	Kaitlyn Lim (SGP)	12.466
12	Kohane Ushioku (JPN)	12.433
13	An Yeon-jeong (KOR)	12.200
14	Darya Yassinskaya (KAZ)	12.166
15	Korkem Yerbossynkyzy (KAZ)	12.166
16	Lai Pin-ju (TPE)	12.166
17	Mikako Serita (JPN)	12.100
18	Aida Bauyrzhanova (KAZ)	12.033
19	An Chang-ok (PRK)	11.900
20	Lin Yi-chen (TPE)	11.600
21	Wu Sing-fen (TPE)	11.600
22	Lim Su-min (KOR)	11.533
23	Phạm Như Phương (VIE)	11.500
24	Sim Hae-win (PRK)	11.466
25	Oh So-seon (KOR)	11.433
26	Kursten Lopez (PHI)	11.266
27	Shandy Poh (SGP)	11.266
28	Pranati Nayak (IND)	11.233
29	Sasiwimon Mueangphuan (THA)	10.966
30	Angel Wong (HKG)	10.600
31	Yun Bo-eun (KOR)	10.566
32	Amina Khalimarden (KAZ)	10.533
33	Charlie Manzano (PHI)	9.400
34	Ananya Patanakul (THA)	9.066
35	Emma Yap (SGP)	9.066
36	Thantida Ruecker (THA)	8.300

=== Final ===
Rank	Athlete	Score
1st place, gold medalist(s)	Mana Okamura (JPN)	13.966
2nd place, silver medalist(s)	Tang Xijing (CHN)	13.733
3rd place, bronze medalist(s)	Ting Hua-tien (TPE)	13.300
4	Zhang Jin (CHN)	13.266
5	Kim Son-hyang (PRK)	12.966
6	Kim Su-jong (PRK)	12.833
7	Misaki Masui (JPN)	12.366
8	Kaitlyn Lim (SGP)	11.600
