= Lan Xingyu =

Chinese artistic gymnast

- 兰星宇
- Born: 18 December 1997 (age 28)

Gymnastics career
- Discipline: Men's artistic gymnastics
- Country represented: China
- Club: Guangxi Province
- Head coaches: Wang Hongwei (national); Lei Shujun (club)
Medal record
Representing China
World Championships
Gold medal – first place	2021 Kitakyushu	Rings
Gold medal – first place	2026 Rotterdam	Rings
Bronze medal – third place	2025 Jakarta	Rings
Bronze medal – third place	2026 Rotterdam	Team
Asian Games
Gold medal – first place	2022 Hangzhou	Team
Gold medal – first place	2022 Hangzhou	Rings
Gold medal – first place	2026 Aichi-Nagoya	Team
Gold medal – first place	2026 Aichi-Nagoya	Rings
Bronze medal – third place	2022 Hangzhou	All-around
Asian Championships
Gold medal – first place	2019 Ulaanbaatar	Team
Gold medal – first place	2019 Ulaanbaatar	Rings
Gold medal – first place	2022 Doha	Team
Gold medal – first place	2022 Doha	Rings
Gold medal – first place	2023 Singapore	Team
Gold medal – first place	2023 Singapore	Rings
Gold medal – first place	2025 Jecheon	Rings
Silver medal – second place	2025 Jecheon	Team
World University Games
Gold medal – first place	2021 Chengdu	Team
Gold medal – first place	2021 Chengdu	Rings
FIG World Cup
Event	1st	2nd	3rd
Apparatus World Cup	1	0	0
World Challenge Cup	1	0	3
Total	2	0	3

Lan Xingyu (simplified Chinese: 兰星宇; traditional Chinese: 蘭星宇; pinyin: Lán Xīngyǔ; born 18 December 1997) is a Chinese artistic gymnast. He competed in the 2019 Asian Artistic Gymnastics Championships in Ulaanbaatar, Mongolia, winning gold medals in both the team event and the still rings event. In the 2019 FIG World Cup in Doha, he won an additional individual gold in still rings. At the 2021 World Artistic Gymnastics Championships he became World Champion on still rings.
