= Kakeru Tanigawa =

Japanese artistic gymnast

- Born: 15 February 1999 (age 27)

Gymnastics career
- Discipline: Men's artistic gymnastics
- Country represented: Japan
Medal record
Men's artistic gymnastics
Representing Japan
World Championships
Silver medal – second place	2022 Liverpool	Team
Bronze medal – third place	2018 Doha	Team
Bronze medal – third place	2019 Stuttgart	Team
Asian Games
Silver medal – second place	2018 Jakarta	Team
Silver medal – second place	2022 Hangzhou	Team
Bronze medal – third place	2022 Hangzhou	Parallel Bars
Bronze medal – third place	2022 Hangzhou	Horizontal Bar
Summer Universiade
Gold medal – first place	2019 Naples	Team
Gold medal – first place	2019 Naples	Parallel Bars
Bronze medal – third place	2019 Naples	Floor

Kakeru Tanigawa (谷川 翔, Tanigawa Kakeru; born 15 February 1999) is a Japanese artistic gymnast. He is the 2018 and 2019 Japanese National All Around Champion. His older brother, Wataru Tanigawa, is also an international gymnast.

In 2018, he won the silver medal in the men's team event at the 2018 Asian Games in Jakarta, Indonesia. In the same year, he also won the bronze medal in the men's team event at the 2018 World Artistic Gymnastics Championships held in Doha, Qatar. A year later, he also won the bronze medal in the men's team event at the 2019 World Artistic Gymnastics Championships held in Stuttgart, Germany.

In 2014, he won several medals in the men's junior events at the 2014 Pacific Rim Gymnastics Championships held in Richmond, British Columbia.

In 2019, he won the gold medal in the men's team event at the 2019 Summer Universiade in Naples, Italy. He also won the bronze medal in the floor event, and the gold medal on parallel bars.
