= Shohei Kawakami (gymnast) =

Japanese artistic gymnast (born 2003)

- 川上 翔平
- Born: 19 September 2003 (age 23)

Gymnastics career
- Discipline: Men's artistic gymnastics
- Country represented: Japan
Medal record
Representing Japan
Men's artistic gymnastics
World Championships
Gold medal – first place	2026 Rotterdam	Team
Asian Games
Silver medal – second place	2022 Hangzhou	Team
World University Games
Gold medal – first place	2025 Rhine-Ruhr	Team
Silver medal – second place	2021 Chengdu	Team
Silver medal – second place	2025 Rhine-Ruhr	All-around

Shohei Kawakami (Japanese: 川上 翔平; born 19 September 2003) is a Japanese artistic gymnast. He helped Japan win a gold medal in the team event at the 2026 World Artistic Gymnastics Championships.

== Gymnastics career ==
In February 2023, during the 2023 FIG Artistic Gymnastics World Cup series in Cottbus, Germany, he won a gold medal on horizontal bar.

In July 2025, he competed at the 2025 Summer World University Games and won a gold medal in the team event. He also won a silver medal in the individual all-around.

In October 2026, he competed at the 2026 World Artistic Gymnastics Championships and helped Japan win a gold medal in the team event. He also qualified for the horizontal bar final with the highest qualification score of 14.600 points.
