= Hong Kong at the 2022 Asian Games =

- IOC code: HKG
- NOC: Sports Federation and Olympic Committee of Hong Kong, China
- Website: https://hkolympic.org/

in Hangzhou, Zhejiang, China September 23 – October 8
- Competitors: 681 in 40 sports
- Flag bearers: Salom Yiu and Juanita Mok
- Medals Ranked 12th: Gold 8 Silver 16 Bronze 29 Total 53

Asian Games appearances (overview)
- 1954; 1958; 1962; 1966; 1970; 1974; 1978; 1982; 1986; 1990; 1994; 1998; 2002; 2006; 2010; 2014; 2018; 2022; 2026

Hong Kong, China competed at the 2022 Asian Games in Hangzhou, Zhejiang, China, from 23 September 2023 to 8 October 2023. Earlier the event was scheduled to held in September 2022 but due to COVID-19 pandemic cases rising in China the event was postponed and rescheduled to September–October 2023.

Preparations for the Hong Kong delegation were overseen by Commissioner for Sports Yang Deqiang.

== Medalists ==
The following Hong Kong competitors won medals at the Games.

| Medal | Name | Sport | Event | Date |
|---|---|---|---|---|
| Gold | Lam San Tung; Wong Wai Chun | Rowing | Men's pair | 24 September |
| Gold | Cheung Ka Long | Fencing | Men's individual foil | 24 September |
| Gold | Siobhán Haughey | Swimming | Women's 200 m freestyle | 25 September |
| Gold | Max John Woodward; Michael Richard Coverdale; Alessandro Nardoni; Max Denmark; James Murray Christie; Liam Martin Doherty; Liam Thomas Herbert; Cado Lee; Hugo Eden Stiles; Russell Elliot Webb; Salom Yiu; Alexander Robert McQueen | Rugby sevens | Men's tournament | 26 September |
| Gold | Siobhán Haughey | Swimming | Women's 100 m freestyle | 26 September |
| Gold | Kho Taichi | Golf | Men's individual | 1 October |
| Gold | Yang Qianyu | Cycling | Women's road race | 4 October |
| Gold | Chiu Wai Lap; Ho Hoi Tung; Ho Wai Lam; Lai Wai Kit; Mak Kwok Fai; Sze Shun Sum | Bridge | Men's team | 6 October |
| Silver | Liu Xuxu | Wushu | Women's changquan | 25 September |
| Silver | Cheung Hoi Lam; Leung King Wan | Rowing | Men's pair | 25 September |
| Silver | Hui Tak Yan Samuel | Wushu | Men's taijiquan and tajijian | 25 September |
| Silver | Ho Ian Yentou | Swimming | Men's 50 m freestyle | 25 September |
| Silver | Ngai Wai Yan | Sailing | Women's RS:X | 26 September |
| Silver | Stephanie Louise Norton | Sailing | Women's ILKA6 | 27 September |
| Silver | Ma Kwan Ching | Sailing | Women's iQFoil | 27 September |
| Silver | Kong Man Wai Vivian; Chan Wai Ling; Hsieh Kaylin Sin Yan; Chu Ka Mong | Fencing | Women's team épée | 27 September |
| Silver | Jacqueline Siu | Equestrian | Individual dressage | 28 September |
| Silver | Lee Sze Wing; Yang Qianyu | Cycling | Women's madison | 28 September |
| Silver | Leung Ka Yu | Cycling | Men's omnium | 28 September |
| Silver | Siobhán Haughey | Swimming | Women's 50 m freestyle | 28 September |
| Silver | Lee Sze Wing | Cycling | Women's omnium | 29 September |
| Silver | Chan Sin Yuk; Ho Tze Lok; Lee Ka Yi; Tong Tsz Wing | Squash | Women's team | 30 September |
| Silver | Law Hing Lung; Chan Cheuk Kit; Yip Ho Lam; Yuen Pak Lam; Yip Wai Lam | Esports | Dream Three Kingdoms 2 | 30 September |
| Silver | Chan Sin Yuk | Squash | Women's singles | 5 October |
| Bronze | Chen Huijin | Wushu | Women's taijiquan and taijijian | 24 September |
| Bronze | Choi Chun Yin Ryan | Fencing | Men's individual foil | 24 September |
| Bronze | Kong Man Wai Vivian | Fencing | Women's individual épée | 24 September |
| Bronze | Siobhán Haughey | Swimming | Women's 50 m breaststroke | 24 September |
| Bronze | Camille Cheng; Siobhán Haughey; Tam Hoi Lam; Stephanie Au; Natalie Kan | Swimming | Women's 4 × 100 m freestyle relay | 24 September |
| Bronze | Chiu Hin Chun | Rowing | Men's single sculls | 25 September |
| Bronze | Chan Nok Sze Daphne | Fencing | Women's individual foil | 25 September |
| Bronze | Akira Sakai; Russell Aylsworth | Sailing | Men's 49er | 26 September |
| Bronze | Forrest Shanna Sanman; Au Yeung Sin Yi; Chloe Chan; Natasha Olson-Thorne; Melody Blessing Li Nim Yan; Nam Ka Man; Ho Tsz Wun; Fung Hoi Ching; Jessica Ho; Stephanie Chan Chor Ki; Tse Wing Kiu; Chong Ka-yan | Rugby sevens | Women's tournament | 26 September |
| Bronze | Annie Ho Yuen Yan; Samantha Chan; Jacqueline Siu | Equestrian | Team dressage | 26 September |
| Bronze | Ho Wai Hang | Fencing | Men's individual épée | 26 September |
| Bronze | Cheng Ching Yin | Sailing | Men's iQFoil | 27 September |
| Bronze | Lee Sze Wing; Leung Bo Yee; Leung Wing Yee; Yang Qianyu | Cycling | Women's team pursuit | 27 September |
| Bronze | Cheung Ka Long; Choi Chun Yin Ryan; Yeung Chi Ka; Nicholas Choi | Fencing | Men's team foil | 27 September |
| Bronze | Cheng Hiu Wai Valerie; Chan Nok Sze Daphne; Sophia Wu; Kuan Yu Ching | Fencing | Women's team foil | 28 September |
| Bronze | Ho Wai Hang; Lau Ho Fung; Fong Hoi Sun; Ng Ho Tin | Fencing | Men's team épée | 29 September |
| Bronze | Lau Tsz Kwan; Leung Chi Hin Henry; Tang Ming Hong; Wong Chi Him | Squash | Men's team | 29 September |
| Bronze | Stephanie Au; Siobhán Haughey; Natalie Kan; Tam Hoi Lam; Cheung Sum Yuet Cindy; Hoi Kiu Lam; Hoi Ching Yeung; Camille Cheng | Swimming | Women's 4 × 100 m medley relay | 29 September |
| Bronze | Hak Shun-yat; Matthew Cheung Hung-hai; Kho Taichi; Ng Shing Fung | Golf | Men's team | 1 October |
| Bronze | Wong Hok Him; Tony Fung Ga Zen; Lam Ka Yan; Chan Chun Kit | Xiangqi | Mixed team | 1 October |
| Bronze | Wong Tsz To; Bailee Brown; Jason NG Tai Long; Charlotte Emily Hall | Triathlon | Mixed relay | 2 October |
| Bronze | Wong Chun Ting | Table tennis | Men's singles | 2 October |
| Bronze | Yue Nga Yan | Athletics | Women's long jump | 2 October |
| Bronze | Vincent Lau Wan Yau | Cycling | Men's individual time trial | 3 October |
| Bronze | Lee Ka Yi; Wong Chi Him | Squash | Mixed doubles | 4 October |
| Bronze | Ho Tze Lok | Squash | Women's singles | 4 October |
| Bronze | Leung Chi Hin Henry | Squash | Men's singles | 4 October |
| Bronze | Chan Pui Yi Pearlie; Koo Hor Yung Charmian; Tang Tsz In; Tung Sau Yin Joyce; Wong Wai Man Flora; Yeung Hoi Ning | Bridge | Women's team | 4 October |
| Bronze | Grace Lau | Karate | Women's kata | 5 October |

Medals by sport
| Sport | 1st place, gold medalist(s) | 2nd place, silver medalist(s) | 3rd place, bronze medalist(s) | Total |
| Athletics | 0 | 0 | 1 | 1 |
| Bridge | 1 | 0 | 1 | 2 |
| Cycling | 1 | 3 | 2 | 6 |
| Esports | 0 | 1 | 0 | 1 |
| Equestrian | 0 | 1 | 1 | 2 |
| Fencing | 1 | 1 | 7 | 9 |
| Golf | 1 | 0 | 1 | 2 |
| Karate | 0 | 0 | 1 | 1 |
| Rowing | 1 | 1 | 1 | 3 |
| Rugby sevens | 1 | 0 | 1 | 2 |
| Sailing | 0 | 3 | 2 | 5 |
| Swimming | 2 | 2 | 3 | 7 |
| Squash | 0 | 2 | 4 | 6 |
| Table tennis | 0 | 0 | 1 | 1 |
| Triathlon | 0 | 0 | 1 | 1 |
| Wushu | 0 | 2 | 1 | 3 |
| Xiangqi | 0 | 0 | 1 | 1 |
| Total | 8 | 16 | 29 | 53 |

Medals by day
| Day | Date | 1st place, gold medalist(s) | 2nd place, silver medalist(s) | 3rd place, bronze medalist(s) | Total |
| 1 | 24 September | 2 | 0 | 5 | 7 |
| 2 | 25 September | 1 | 4 | 2 | 7 |
| 3 | 26 September | 2 | 1 | 4 | 7 |
| 4 | 27 September | 0 | 3 | 3 | 6 |
| 5 | 28 September | 0 | 4 | 1 | 5 |
| 6 | 29 September | 0 | 1 | 3 | 4 |
| 7 | 30 September | 0 | 2 | 0 | 2 |
| 8 | 1 October | 1 | 0 | 2 | 3 |
| 9 | 2 October | 0 | 0 | 3 | 3 |
| 10 | 3 October | 0 | 0 | 1 | 1 |
| 11 | 4 October | 1 | 0 | 4 | 5 |
| 12 | 5 October | 0 | 1 | 1 | 2 |
| 13 | 6 October | 1 | 0 | 0 | 1 |
| 14 | 7 October | 0 | 0 | 0 | 0 |
| 15 | 8 October | 0 | 0 | 0 | 0 |
| Total | | 8 | 16 | 29 | 53 |

== Competitors ==
The following is a list of the number of competitors representing Hong Kong that participated at the Games:

| Sport | Men | Women | Total |
|---|---|---|---|
| Archery | 8 | 8 | 16 |
| Artistic swimming | — | 10 | 10 |
| Athletics | 14 | 13 | 27 |
| Badminton | 10 | 10 | 20 |
| Baseball | 24 | — | 24 |
| Basketball | 16 | 16 | 32 |
| Boxing | 1 | — | 1 |
| Bridge | 9 | 9 | 18 |
| Breakdancing | 2 | 2 | 4 |
| Canoeing | 8 | — | 8 |
| Chess | 5 | 5 | 10 |
| Cricket | 15 | 15 | 30 |
| Cycling | 15 | 13 | 28 |
| Diving | 1 | 2 | 3 |
| Dragon boat | 14 | 14 | 28 |
| Esports | 31 | — | 31 |
| Equestrian | 2 | 7 | 10 |
| Fencing | 12 | 12 | 24 |
| Field hockey | — | 18 | 18 |
| Football | 22 | 22 | 44 |
| Go | 6 | 4 | 10 |
| Golf | 4 | 3 | 7 |
| Gymnastics | 5 | 2 | 7 |
| Handball | 16 | 16 | 32 |
| Judo | 4 | 4 | 8 |
| Karate | 5 | 4 | 9 |
| Marathon swimming | 2 | 2 | 4 |
| Roller sports | 5 | 4 | 9 |
| Rowing | 13 | 9 | 22 |
| Rugby sevens | 12 | 12 | 24 |
| Sailing | 7 | 6 | 13 |
| Shooting | 1 | 1 | 2 |
| Softball | — | 17 | 17 |
| Sport climbing | 4 | 2 | 6 |
| Squash | 4 | 4 | 8 |
| Swimming | 19 | 18 | 37 |
| Table tennis | 5 | 5 | 10 |
| Taekwondo | 4 | 4 | 8 |
| Tennis | 2 | 4 | 6 |
| Triathlon | 3 | 3 | 6 |
| Volleyball | 14 | 16 | 30 |
| Water polo | 13 | — | 13 |
| Wushu | 2 | 5 | 7 |
| Xiangqi | 4 | 1 | 5 |
| Total | 363 | 322 | 685 |

== Athletics ==
Track & road events
Men

| Athlete | Event | Heats | | Semi-final | | Final | |
| Athlete | Event | Result | Rank | Result | Rank | Result | Rank |
|---|---|---|---|---|---|---|---|
| Lee Hong Kit | 100 m | 10.59 | 5 | Did not advance | | | |
| Shak Kam Ching | 100 m | 10.55 | 5 | Did not advance | | | |
| Chan Chun Ho | 200 m | 22.12 | 6 | Did not advance | | | |
| Shak Kam Ching | 200 m | 21.99 | 7 | Did not advance | | | |
| Lee Ka Yiu | 110 m hurdles | 14.20 | 6 | —N/a | | Did not advance | |
| Mui Ching Yeung | 110 m hurdles | 14.04 | 6 | —N/a | | Did not advance | |
| Chan Yat Lok; Diu Felix Chun Hei; Ho Wai Lun; Lee Hong Kit; Ng Ka Fung | 4 × 100 m relay | DQ | | —N/a | | Did not advance | |
| Chin Man Kit | 20 km walk | —N/a | | | | 1:37:43 | 10 |

Women

| Athlete | Event | Heats | | Semi-final | | Final | |
| Athlete | Event | Result | Rank | Result | Rank | Result | Rank |
|---|---|---|---|---|---|---|---|
| Kong Chun Ki | 100 m | 11.87 | 6 | Did not advance | | | |
| Leung Kwan Yi | 100 m | 12.01 | 5 | Did not advance | | | |
| Li Tsz To | 200 m | 24.89 | 5 | Did not advance | | | |
| Shing Cho Yan | 100 m hurdles | 14.46 | 6 | —N/a | | Did not advance | |
| Lui Lai Yiu | 100 m hurdles | 13.24 | 4 q | —N/a | | 13.35 | 6 |
| Chan Pui Kei; Leung Kwan Yi; Li Tsz To; Kong Chun Ki | 4 × 100 m relay | —N/a | | | | 45.24 | 5 |
| Ching Siu Nga | 20 km walk | —N/a | | | | 1:43:27 | 6 |

Mixed

| Athlete | Event | Heats | | Semi-final | | Final | |
| Athlete | Event | Result | Rank | Result | Rank | Result | Rank |
|---|---|---|---|---|---|---|---|
| Ching Siu Nga; Chin Man Kit | 35 km walk relay | —N/a | | | | 5:57.04 | 4 |

Field events
Men

| Athlete | Event | Qualification | | Final | |
| Athlete | Event | Distance | Position | Distance | Position |
|---|---|---|---|---|---|
| Michael John Kennelly | High jump | 2.10 | 13 | Did not advance | |
| Chan Ming Tai | Long jump | 7.54 | 10 q | 7.83 | 6 |
| Ko Ho Long | Long jump | 7.26 | 13 | Did not advance | |
| Ricky Hui Wai Hei | Javelin throw | —N/a | | 62.55 | 12 |

Women

| Athlete | Event | Qualification | | Final | |
| Athlete | Event | Distance | Position | Distance | Position |
|---|---|---|---|---|---|
| Chung Wai Yan | High jump | —N/a | | 1.80 | 5 |
| Wong Yuen Nam | High jump | —N/a | | 1.75 | 7 |
| Chan Ka Sin | Long jump | —N/a | | NM | — |
| Yue Nga Yan | Long jump | —N/a | | 6.50 | 3rd place, bronze medalist(s) |
| Vera Chan Shannon | Triple jump | —N/a | | 12.59 | 8 |

== Cycling ==
=== Mountain biking ===
| Athlete | Event | Final | |
| Athlete | Event | Time | Rank |
|---|---|---|---|
| Lai Chun Kin | Men's cross-country | 1:49:59 | 8 |
| Kwan Tsz Kwan | Women's cross-country | LAP (1 lap) | 9 |

=== Road ===
| Athlete | Event | Final | |
| Athlete | Event | Time | Rank |
|---|---|---|---|
| Ko Siu Wai | Men's road race | 4:32:50 | 16 |
| Vincent Lau Wan Yau | Men's road race | DNF | — |
| Leung Chun Wing | Men's road race | 4:32:59 | 29 |
| Leung Ka Yu | Men's road race | 4:32:50 | 15 |
| Lee Sze Wing | Women's road race | 3:36:07 | 8 |
| Yang Qianyu | Women's road race | 3:36:07 | 1st place, gold medalist(s) |
| Vincent Lau Wan Yau | Men's time trial | 50:17.76 | 3rd place, bronze medalist(s) |
| Lee Wing Yee | Women's time trial | 25:50.36 | 4 |

=== Track ===
Sprint

| Athlete | Event | Qualification | | Round 1 | Repechage 1 | Round 2 | Repechage 2 | Quarterfinals | Semifinals | Final | |
| Athlete | Event | Time | Rank | Opposition Time | Opposition Time | Opposition Time | Opposition Time | Opposition Time | Opposition Time | Opposition Time | Rank |
|---|---|---|---|---|---|---|---|---|---|---|---|
| To Cheuk Hei | Men's sprint | 10.105 | 14 Q | Xue Cx (CHN); L | Kang S-j (KOR); L | Did not advance | | | | | |
| Yung Tsun Ho | Men's sprint | 10.357 | 17 | Did not advance | | | | | | | |
| Ng Sze Wing | Women's sprint | 11.230 | 8 Q | Yeung CY (HKG); L | Lestari (INA); W 11.832 | Ohta (JPN); L | Rasee (THA); Yeung CY (HKG); L | Did not advance | | | |
| Yeung Cho Yiu | Women's sprint | 11.291 | 9 Q | Ng SW (HKG); W 11.695 | Bye | Lee H-j (KOR); L | Rasee (THA); Ng SW (HKG); L | Did not advance | | | |

Team sprint

| Athlete | Event | Qualification | | Semifinals | | Final | |
| Athlete | Event | Time | Rank | Opposition Time | Rank | Opposition Time | Rank |
|---|---|---|---|---|---|---|---|
| Mok Tsz Chun; To Cheuk Hei; Yung Tsun Ho | Men's team sprint | 45.134 | 5 | Chinese Taipei (TPE); L 44.796 | 6 | Did not advance | 6 |
| Ching Yin Shan; Ng Sze Wing; Yeung Cho Yiu | Women's team sprint | 50.902 | 5 | Chinese Taipei (TPE); L 50.681 | 5 | Did not advance | 5 |

Pursuit

| Athlete | Event | Qualification | | Semifinals | | Final | |
| Athlete | Event | Time | Rank | Opponent Time | Rank | Opponent Time | Rank |
|---|---|---|---|---|---|---|---|
| Chu Tsun Wai; Mow Ching Yin; Ng Pak Hang; Leung Ka Yu | Men's team pursuit | 4:09.972 | 5 | Uzbekistan (UZB); 4:02.210 | 4 QB | South Korea (KOR); L 4:05.507 | 4 |
| Lee Sze Wing; Leung Bo Yee; Leung Wing Yee; Yang Qianyu | Women's team pursuit | 4:34.009 | 4 | Japan (JPN); 4:33.363 | 4 QB | South Korea (KOR); W 4:28.888 | 3rd place, bronze medalist(s) |

Keirin

| Athlete | Event | First round | Repechage | Semifinals | Final |
| Athlete | Event | Rank | Rank | Rank | Rank |
|---|---|---|---|---|---|
| To Cheuk Hei | Men's keirin | 3 R | 2 Q | 4 | 9 |
| Yung Tsun Ho | Men's keirin | 5 R | 4 | Did not advance | |
| Ng Sze Wing | Women's keirin | 2 Q | Bye | 6 | 12 |
| Yeung Cho Yiu | Women's keirin | 3 R | 4 | Did not advance | |

Omnium

| Athlete | Event | Scratch race | | Tempo race | | Elimination race | | Points race | | Total points | Rank |
| Athlete | Event | Rank | Points | Rank | Points | Rank | Points | Rank | Points | Total points | Rank |
|---|---|---|---|---|---|---|---|---|---|---|---|
| Leung Ka Yu | Men's omnium | 3 | 36 | 7 | 28 | 3 | 36 | 4 | 43 | 143 | 2nd place, silver medalist(s) |
| Lee Sze Wing | Women's omnium | 2 | 38 | 1 | 40 | 4 | 34 | 5 | 15 | 127 | 2nd place, silver medalist(s) |

Madison

| Athlete | Event | Points | Laps | Rank |
|---|---|---|---|---|
| Leung Ka Yu; Leung Chun Wing | Men's madison | 31 | 0 | 4 |
| Lee Sze Wing; Yang Qianyu | Women's madison | 40 | 0 | 2nd place, silver medalist(s) |

== Fencing ==
Men

| Athlete | Event | Preliminary | | Round of 32 | Round of 16 | Quarterfinals | Semifinals | Final | |
| Athlete | Event | Opposition Score | Rank | Opposition Score | Opposition Score | Opposition Score | Opposition Score | Opposition Score | Rank |
|---|---|---|---|---|---|---|---|---|---|
| Ho Wai Hang | Individual épée | Kurbanov (KAZ): L 4–5; Mohsin (PAK): W 5–3; Chaloemchanen (THA): W 5–2; Nurmatov (UZB): W 5–3; Bakytbek (KGZ): W 5–1; Tsoggerel (MGL): W 5–1 | 4 Q | Bye | Nguyễn PD (VIE); W 15–12 | Jose (PHI); W 15–10 | Komata (JPN); L 12–15 | Did not advance | 3rd place, bronze medalist(s) |
| Ng Ho Tin | Individual épée | Kano (JPN): W 3–2; Awan (PAK): W 5–1; Odeh (JOR): W 5–0; Almaazmi (UAE): W 5–3; Alimov (UZB): W 3–2; Batchuluun (MGL): W 4–2 | 2 Q | Bye | Odeh (JOR); W 15–12 | Kano (JPN); L 9–14 | Did not advance | | 5 |
| Ho Wai Hang; Lau Ho Fung; Fong Hoi Sun; Ng Ho Tin | Team épée | —N/a | | | | Uzbekistan (UZB); W 45–31 | Kazakhstan (KAZ); L 30–45 | Did not advance | 3rd place, bronze medalist(s) |
| Cheung Ka Long | Individual foil | Nguyễn MQ (VIE): W 5–2; Asranov (UZB): W 5–1; Deejing (THA): W 5–4; Chen C-c (TPE): W 5–2 | 5 Q | Bye | Hussein (QAT); W 15–8 | Xu J (CHN); W 15–7 | Shikine (JPN); W 15–14 | Chen Hw (CHN); W 15–2 | 1st place, gold medalist(s) |
| Ryan Choi | Individual foil | Im C-w (KOR): W 5–0; Wakim (LBN): W 5–0; Nguyễn VH (VIE): W 5–4; Ghaith (IRQ): W 5–0; Dev (IND): W 5–3 | 2 Q | Bye | Wakim (LBN); W 15–8 | Lee K-h (KOR); W 15–14 | Chen Hw (CHN); L9–15 | Did not advance | 3rd place, bronze medalist(s) |
| Cheung Ka Long; Ryan Choi; Nicholas Choi; Yeung Chi Ka | Team foil | —N/a | | | | Singapore (SGP); W 45–34 | South Korea (KOR); L 37–45 | Did not advance | 3rd place, bronze medalist(s) |
| Aaron Ho Sze Long | Individual sabre | Oh S-u (KOR): L0–5; Gajurel (NEP): W 5–0; Streets (JPN): L 1–5; Yan Yh (CHN): L 3–5; Abdulkareem (KUW): W 5–0; Nguyễn VQ (VIE): W 5–2 | 13 Q | Srinualnad (THA); W 15–9 | Yan Yh (CHN); L 12–15 | Did not advance | | | 13 |
| Low Ho Tin | Individual sabre | Al-Mutairi (KSA): L 1–5; Sarkissyan (KAZ): W 5–2; Pakdaman (IRI): L 3–5; Yonjan (NEP): W 5–0; Mamutov (UZB): W 5–3 | 6 Q | Bye | Sarkissyan (KAZ); L 13–15 | Did not advance | | | 9 |
| Aaron Ho Sze Long; Royce Chan Lok Hei; Low Ho Tin; Chow Chung Hei | Team sabre | —N/a | | Thailand (THA); W 45–31 | Iran (IRI); L 39–45 | Did not advance | | | 6 |

Women

| Athlete | Event | Preliminary | | Round of 32 | Round of 16 | Quarterfinals | Semifinals | Final | |
| Athlete | Event | Opposition Score | Rank | Opposition Score | Opposition Score | Opposition Score | Opposition Score | Opposition Score | Rank |
|---|---|---|---|---|---|---|---|---|---|
| Kaylin Hsieh | Individual épée | Al-Ahdal (YEM): W 5–0; Pistsova (KAZ): W 4–3; Abdyl-Khamitova (KGZ): W 5–0; Arora (IND): W 3–2; Satō (JPN): W 2–0 | 3 Q | Bye | Satō (JPN); L 11–13 | Did not advance | | | 9 |
| Vivian Kong | Individual épée | Xu N (CHN): L 3–5; Alkloub (JOR): W 5–2; Gomez (PHI): W 5–2; Batsaikhan (MGL): W 5–2; Nikolaichuk (KAZ): L 4–5 | 13 Q | Abdyl-Khamitova (KGZ); W 15–2 | Nikolaichuk (KAZ); W 2–2 | Khatri (IND); W 15–7 | Song S-r (KOR); W 15–11 | Did not advance | 3rd place, bronze medalist(s) |
| Chan Wai Ling; Chu Ka Mong; Kaylin Hsieh; Vivian Kong | Team épée | —N/a | | | Bye | Singapore (SGP); W 45–25 | Japan (JPN); W 45–26 | South Korea (KOR); L 34–36 | 2nd place, silver medalist(s) |
| Daphne Chan | Individual foil | Thapa (NEP): W 5–0; Hong H-j (KOR): W 5–3; Majali (JOR): W 5–0; Smithisukul (THA): W 5–0; Ku HL (MAC): W 5–1; Azuma (JPN): W 5–4 | 1 Q | —N/a | Majali (JOR); W 15–8 | Hong H-j (KOR); W 15–10 | Ueno (JPN); L 7–15 | Did not advance | 3rd place, bronze medalist(s) |
| Valerie Cheng | Individual foil | Chen Qy (CHN): W 5–3; Berthier (SGP): W 5–4; Ilyosova (UZB): L 3–5; Iec PC (MAC): W 5–1; Albreiki (UAE): W 5–1; Hai (CAM): W 5–0 | 5 Q | —N/a | Iec PC (MAC); W 15–3 | Ueno (JPN); L 10–15 | Did not advance | | 5 |
| Daphne Chan; Valerie Cheng; Kuan Yu Ching; Sophia Wu | Team foil | —N/a | | | | Thailand (THA); W 45–15 | South Korea (KOR); L 25–45 | Did not advance | 3rd place, bronze medalist(s) |
| Au Sin Ying | Individual sabre | Ong (SGP): L 3–5; Yang Hy (CHN): L 1–5; Jeon E-h (KOR): L 2–5; Mujib (BAN): W 5–0; Srinualnad (THA): L 4–5 | 18 | Did not advance | | | | | 18 |
| Laren Leung | Individual sabre | Yoon J-s (KOR): W 5–3; Pliego (UZB): L 1–5; Almasri (KSA): W 5–3; Fukushima (JPN): L 4–5 | 12 Q | Bye | Daybekova (UZB); L 12–15 | Did not advance | | | 10 |
| Laren Leung; Summer Sit; Au Sin Ying; Chu Wing Kiu | Team sabre | —N/a | | | Bangladesh (BAN); W 45–17 | South Korea (KOR); L 25–45 | Did not advance | | 7 |

== Sport climbing ==
Speed

| Athlete | Event | Qualification | | Round of 16 | Quarter-finals | Semi-finals | Final / BM | |
| Athlete | Event | Best | Rank | Opposition Time | Opposition Time | Opposition Time | Opposition Time | Rank |
|---|---|---|---|---|---|---|---|---|
| Shoji Chan | Men's | 6.129 | 15 Q | Wu (CHN); L 6.223–5.240 | Did not advance | | | |
| Wong Cheuk Nam | Men's | 5.790 | 13 Q | Alipour (IRI); L 8.021–5.280 | Did not advance | | | |

Speed relay

| Athlete | Event | Qualification | | Quarter-finals | Semi-finals | Final / BM | |
| Athlete | Event | Time | Rank | Opposition Time | Opposition Time | Opposition Time | Rank |
|---|---|---|---|---|---|---|---|
| Au Chi Fung; Shoji Chan; Ho Cheuk Hei; Wong Cheuk Nam | Men's | 21.080 | 8 Q | Indonesia (INA); L 19.651–17.979 | Did not advance | | |

Combined

| Athlete | Event | Qualification | | | | Semi-finals | | | | Final | | | |
| Athlete | Event | Boulder Point | Lead Point | Total | Rank | Boulder Point | Lead Point | Total | Rank | Boulder Point | Lead Point | Total | Rank |
|---|---|---|---|---|---|---|---|---|---|---|---|---|---|
| Shoji Chan | Men's | 99.7 | 54.1 | 153.8 | 6 Q | 44.7 | 24 | 68.7 | 8 Q | 39.3 | 8.1 | 47.4 | 7 |
| Ho Cheuk Hei | Men's | 69.4 | 30 | 99.4 | 11 Q | 29.3 | 26 | 55.3 | 11 | Did not advance | | | |
| Tsui Tsz Kiu | Women's | 59.7 | 7.1 | 66.8 | 13 Q | 13.06 | 7 | 20.06 | 16 | Cancelled (Note: The women's boulder and lead final has been cancelled due to rain and safety of the athletes. The semi-finals result would be used as final result.) | | | |
| Wong Tseng Shun | Women's | 59.9 | 7.1 | 67.0 | 12 Q | 19.06 | 20.1 | 39.16 | 11 | Cancelled | | | |

== Squash ==
Singles

| Athlete | Event | Round of 32 | Round of 16 | Quarterfinals | Semifinals | Final | Rank |
| Athlete | Event | Opposition score | Opposition score | Opposition score | Opposition score | Opposition score | Rank |
|---|---|---|---|---|---|---|---|
| Lau Tsz Kwan | Men | Bye | Hayashi (JPN); W 3–0 | H Leung (HKG); L 0–3 | Did not advance | | |
| Henry Leung | Men | Bye | Na J-y (KOR); W 3–1 | Lau TK (HKG); W 3–0 | Ghosal (IND); L 0–3 | Did not advance | 3rd place, bronze medalist(s) |
| Chan Sin Yuk | Women | Bye | Yeung WC (MAC); W 3–0 | Azman (MAS); W 3–0 | Ho T-L (HKG); W 3–0 | Subramaniam (MAS); L 2–3 | 2nd place, silver medalist(s) |
| Ho Tze-Lok | Women | Bye | Sadiq (PAK); W 3–0 | Midorikawa (JPN); W 3–0 | Chan SY (HKG); L 0–3 | Did not advance | 3rd place, bronze medalist(s) |

Doubles

| Athlete | Event | Group stage | | | | | Quarterfinals | Semifinals | Final | Rank |
| Athlete | Event | Opposition score | Opposition score | Opposition score | Opposition score | Rank | Opposition score | Opposition score | Opposition score | Rank |
|---|---|---|---|---|---|---|---|---|---|---|
| Lee Ka Yi; Wong Chi Him | Mixed | Shrestha / Bhlon (NEP); W 2–0 | Ngamprasert / Buranakul (THA); W 2–0 | Yang Y-s / Lee D-j (KOR); W 2–0 | Yuen / Arnold (MAS); W 2–0 | 1 Q | Tong TW / Tang MH (HKG); W 2–0 | Karthik / Sandhu (IND); L 1–2 | Did not advance | 3rd place, bronze medalist(s) |
| Tong Tsz Wing; Tang Ming Hong | Mixed | Prasertratanakul / Arkarahirunya (THA); W 2–0 | Gul / Zaman (PAK); W 2–0 | Dalida / Shrestha (NEP); W 2–0 | Singh / Singh (IND); L 0–2 | 2 Q | Lee KY / Wong CH (HKG); L 0–2 | Did not advance | | |

Team

| Athlete | Event | Group Stage | | | | | | Semifinals | Finals | |
| Athlete | Event | Opposition score | Opposition score | Opposition score | Opposition score | Opposition score | Rank | Opposition score | Opposition score | Rank |
|---|---|---|---|---|---|---|---|---|---|---|
| Lau Tsz Kwan; Henry Leung; Tang Ming Hong; Wong Chi Him | Men's Team | South Korea (KOR); W 3–0 | Thailand (THA); W 3–0 | Philippines (PHI); W 3–0 | Japan (JPN); W 3–0 | Malaysia (MAS); L 1–2 | 2 Q | Pakistan (PAK); L 1–2 | Did not advance | 3rd place, bronze medalist(s) |
| Chan Sin Yuk; Ho Tze-Lok; Lee Ka Yi; Tong Tsz Wing | Women's Team | Mongolia (MGL); W 3–0 | Thailand (THA); W 3–0 | South Korea (KOR); W 3–0 | Japan (JPN); W 2–1 | —N/a | 1 Q | India (IND); W 2–1 | Malaysia (MAS); L 1–2 | 2nd place, silver medalist(s) |

== Swimming ==
=== Men ===
| Event | Athlete | Heats | | Final | |
| Event | Athlete | Time | Rank | Time | Rank |
|---|---|---|---|---|---|
| 50 m freestyle | Ian Ho | 22.07 | 2 Q | 21.87 | 2nd place, silver medalist(s) |
| 50 m freestyle | Tsui Wai Chi | 23.32 | 14 | Did not advance | |
| 100 m freestyle | Cheuk Ming Ho | 50.02 | 10 | Did not advance | |
| 100 m freestyle | Ian Ho | 50.90 | 14 | Did not advance | |
| 200 m freestyle | Cheuk Ming Ho | 1:51.40 | 12 | Did not advance | |
| 200 m freestyle | He Shing Ip | 1:55.12 | 23 | Did not advance | |
| 400 m freestyle | Cheuk Ming Ho | 3:59.52 | 15 | Did not advance | |
| 400 m freestyle | He Shing Ip | 4:06.53 | 18 | Did not advance | |
| 800 m freestyle | He Shing Ip | —N/a | | 8:35.35 | 14 |
| 800 m freestyle | Kwok Chun Hei | —N/a | | 8:39.53 | 15 |
| 1500 m freestyle | He Shing Ip | —N/a | | 16:21.74 | 11 |
| 1500 m freestyle | Kwok Chun Hei | —N/a | | 16:21.69 | 10 |
| 50 m backstroke | Lau Shiu Yue | 26.28 | 14 | Did not advance | |
| 50 m backstroke | Ng Cheuk Yin | 26.46 | 17 | Did not advance | |
| 100 m backstroke | Hayden Kwan | 56.28 | 9 | Did not advance | |
| 100 m backstroke | Lau Shiu Yue | 57.34 | 13 | Did not advance | |
| 200 m backstroke | Hayden Kwan | 2:02.58 | 6 Q | 2:03.18 | 8 |
| 200 m backstroke | Chan Tsz Chiu | 2:11.81 | 18 | Did not advance | |
| 50 m breaststroke | Ng Yan Kin | 28.71 | 10 | Did not advance | |
| 50 m breaststroke | Fong Ka Yu | 28.94 | 13 | Did not advance | |
| 100 m breaststroke | Benson Wong | 1:02.48 | 12 | Did not advance | |
| 100 m breaststroke | Adam John Chillingworth | 1:02.66 | 14 | Did not advance | |
| 200 m breaststroke | Adam Mak Sai Ting | 2:12.40 | 2 Q | 2:12.46 | 5 |
| 200 m breaststroke | Adam John Chillingworth | 2:13.57 | 7 Q | 2:13.03 | 6 |
| 50 m butterfly | Ian Ho | 24.06 | 11 | Did not advance | |
| 50 m butterfly | Ng Cheuk Yin | 24.50 | 16 | Did not advance | |
| 100 m butterfly | Ng Cheuk Yin | 54.26 | 14 | Did not advance | |
| 100 m butterfly | Nicholas Lim | 54.80 | 18 | Did not advance | |
| 200 m butterfly | Ho Tin Long | 2:05.17 | 13 | Did not advance | |
| 200 m butterfly | Nicholas Lim | 2:02.70 | 10 | Did not advance | |
| 200 m individual medley | Lau Ping Chi | 2:05.29 | 13 | Did not advance | |
| 200 m individual medley | James Lau Kin Hei | 2:07.02 | 16 | Did not advance | |
| 400 m individual medley | Peter Harry Whittington | 4:26.74 | 9 | Did not advance | |
| 400 m individual medley | Ryan Cheung | 4:38.24 | 15 | Did not advance | |
| 4 × 100 m freestyle relay | Cheuk Ming Ho; Ian Ho; Lau Ping Chi; Ng Cheuk Yin | 3:23.35 | 8 Q | 3:21.26 | 5 |
| 4 × 200 m freestyle relay | Cheuk Ming Ho; Lau Ping Chi; He Shing Ip; Lau Shiu Yue | 7:32.79 | 8 Q | DSQ | |
| 4 × 100 m medley relay | Hayden Kwan; Benson Wong; Ng Cheuk Yin; Cheuk Ming Ho | 3:42.40 | 5 Q | 3:42.99 | 6 |

=== Women ===
| Event | Athlete | Heats | | Final | |
| Event | Athlete | Time | Rank | Time | Rank |
|---|---|---|---|---|---|
| 50 m freestyle | Siobhán Haughey | 24.94 | 2 Q | 24.34 | 2nd place, silver medalist(s) |
| 50 m freestyle | Tam Hoi Lam | 25.61 | 7 Q | 25.66 | 6 |
| 100 m freestyle | Siobhán Haughey | 54.27 | 1 Q | 52.17 AR | 1st place, gold medalist(s) |
| 100 m freestyle | Tam Hoi Lam | 55.80 | 7 Q | 55.74 | 8 |
| 200 m freestyle | Siobhán Haughey | 2:00.75 | 5 Q | 1:54.12 GR | 1st place, gold medalist(s) |
| 200 m freestyle | Ho Nam Wai | 2:03.71 | 10 | Did not advance | |
| 400 m freestyle | Chloe Cheng | 4:25.27 | 12 | Did not advance | |
| 400 m freestyle | Ho Nam Wai | 4:23.68 | 11 | Did not advance | |
| 800 m freestyle | Mok Sze Ki | —N/a | | 9:10.91 | 12 |
| 800 m freestyle | Nip Tsz Yin | —N/a | | 9:00.74 | 10 |
| 1500 m freestyle | Nikita Lam Pac Tung | —N/a | | 17:12.74 | 7 |
| 1500 m freestyle | Nip Tsz Yin | —N/a | | 17:27.98 | 9 |
| 50 m backstroke | Stephanie Au | 28.37 | 4 Q | 28.35 | 4 |
| 50 m backstroke | Toto Wong | 29.54 | 12 | Did not advance | |
| 100 m backstroke | Stephanie Au | 1:01.34 | 4 Q | 1:00.78 | 4 |
| 100 m backstroke | Toto Wong | 1:04.44 | 16 | Did not advance | |
| 200 m backstroke | Jessica Chloe Cheng | 2:21.15 | 13 | Did not advance | |
| 200 m backstroke | Cindy Cheung Sum Yuet | 2:14.69 | 6 Q | 2:12.44 | 5 |
| 50 m breaststroke | Siobhán Haughey | 30.46 | 2 Q | 30.36 | 3rd place, bronze medalist(s) |
| 50 m breaststroke | Lam Hoi Kiu | 32.33 | 16 | Did not advance | |
| 100 m breaststroke | Chang Yujuan | 1:11.78 | 14 | Did not advance | |
| 100 m breaststroke | Lam Hoi Kiu | 1:10.22 | 10 | Did not advance | |
| 200 m breaststroke | Chang Yujuan | 2:33.32 | 8 Q | 2:33.23 | 8 |
| 200 m breaststroke | Lam Hoi Kiu | 2:34.12 | 10 | Did not advance | |
| 50 m butterfly | Natalie Kan Cheuk Tung | 27.23 | 11 | Did not advance | |
| 50 m butterfly | Tam Hoi Lam | 27.50 | 12 | Did not advance | |
| 100 m butterfly | Natalie Kan Cheuk Tung | 59.85 | 6 Q | 59.55 | 6 |
| 100 m butterfly | Chan Kin Lok | 1:01.94 | 12 | Did not advance | |
| 200 m butterfly | Mok Sze Ki | 2:15.38 | 10 | Did not advance | |
| 200 m butterfly | Yeung Hoi Ching | 2:14.46 | 9 | Did not advance | |
| 200 m individual medley | Chloe Cheng | 2:19.09 | 9 | Did not advance | |
| 200 m individual medley | Ng Lai Wa | 2:19.99 | 12 | Did not advance | |
| 400 m individual medley | Chloe Cheng | 5:11.94 | 10 | Did not advance | |
| 400 m individual medley | Ng Lai Wa | 4:56.99 | 8 Q | 4:57.79 | 8 |
| 4 × 100 m freestyle relay | Stephanie Au; Camille Cheng; Siobhán Haughey; Natalie Kan Cheuk Tung; Tam Hoi Lam | 3:47.99 | 4 Q | 3:39.10 | 3rd place, bronze medalist(s) |
| 4 × 200 m freestyle relay | Stephanie Au; Camille Cheng; Chloe Cheng; Siobhán Haughey; Ho Nam Wai; Mok Sze Ki; Ng Lai Wa | 8:18.94 | 3 Q | 8:02.42 | 4 |
| 4 × 100 m medley relay | Stephanie Au; Camille Cheng; Cindy Cheung Sum Yuet; Siobhán Haughey; Lam Hoi Kiu; Natalie Kan Cheuk Tung; Tam Hoi Lam; Yeung Hoi Ching | 4:08.34 | 4 Q | 4:01.72 | 3rd place, bronze medalist(s) |

=== Mixed ===
| Event | Athlete | Heats | | Final | |
| Event | Athlete | Time | Rank | Time | Rank |
|---|---|---|---|---|---|
| 4 × 100 m medley relay | Cindy Cheung Sum Yuet; Ian Ho; Lau Ping Chi; Adam Mak Sai Ting; Benson Wong; Yeung Hoi Ching | 3:54.20 | 5 Q | 3:55.21 | 6 |

== Table tennis ==
Individual

| Athlete | Event | Round of 64 | Round of 32 | Round of 16 | Quarterfinals | Semifinals | Final | |
| Athlete | Event | Opposition score | Opposition score | Opposition score | Opposition score | Opposition score | Opposition score | Rank |
|---|---|---|---|---|---|---|---|---|
| Lam Siu Hang | Men's singles | Bye | Ham Y-s (PRK); W 4–1 | Fan Zd (CHN); L 0–4 | Did not advance | | | |
| Wong Chun Ting | Men's singles | Bye | Alyassi (BRN); W 4–0 | Yoshimura (JPN); W 4–3 | Lin Y-j (TPE); W 4–3 | Wang Cq (CHN); L 2–4 | Did not advance | 3rd place, bronze medalist(s) |
| Doo Hoi Kem | Women's singles | Bye | Magdieva (UZB); W 4–0 | Chen S-y (TPE); L 1–4 | Did not advance | | | |
| Zhu Chengzhu | Women's singles | Bye | Batmönkhiin (MGL); W 4–0 | Wang Yd (CHN); L 0–4 | Did not advance | | | |
| Ho Kwan Kit; Wong Chun Ting | Men's doubles | Bye | Alyassi / Rashed (BRN); W 3–0 | Mahmudov / Sultonov (TJK); W 3–1 | Fan Zd / Wang Cq (CHN); L 0–3 | Did not advance | | |
| Lam Siu Hang; Ng Pak Nam | Men's doubles | Hussein / Abdulhussein (QAT); W 3–1 | Ham Y-s / Ri J-s (PRK); L 1–3 | Did not advance | | | | |
| Doo Hoi Kem; Zhu Chengzhu | Women's doubles | Bye | Kuan CL / Lei MI (MAC); W 3–0 | Lee E-h / Yang H-e (KOR); W 3–2 | Cha Sy / Pak S-g (PRK); L 2–3 | Did not advance | | |
| Lee Ho Ching; Li Ching Wan | Women's doubles | Bye | Cheong CH / Seak HL (MAC); W 3–0 | Sun Ys / Wang My (CHN); L 0–3 | Did not advance | | | |
| Ho Kwan Kit; Lee Ho Ching | Mixed doubles | Bye | Rashed / Alaali (BRN); W 3–0 | Harimoto / Hayata (JPN); L 2–3 | Did not advance | | | |
| Wong Chun Ting; Doo Hoi Kem | Mixed doubles | Bye | He CF / Cheong CH (MAC); W 3–0 | Ri J-s / Pyon S-g (PRK); W 3–1 | Wang Cq / Sun Ys (CHN); L 0–3 | Did not advance | | |

Team

| Athlete | Event | Group Stage | | | | Round of 16 | Quarterfinal | Semifinal | Final | |
| Athlete | Event | Opposition Score | Opposition Score | Opposition Score | Rank | Opposition Score | Opposition Score | Opposition Score | Opposition Score | Rank |
|---|---|---|---|---|---|---|---|---|---|---|
| Ho Kwan Kit; Lam Siu Hang; Ng Pak Nam; Wong Chun Ting; Yiu Kwan To | Men's | Mongolia (MGL); W 3–0 | Iran (IRI); W 3–1 | Bahrain (BRN); W 3–0 | 1 Q | North Korea (PRK); W 3–1 | Chinese Taipei (TPE); L 0–3 | Did not advance | | |
| Doo Hoi Kem; Lam Yee Lok; Lee Ho Ching; Li Ching Wan; Zhu Chengzhu | Women's | Bahrain (BRN); W 3–0 | Uzbekistan (UZB); W 3–0 | —N/a | 1 Q | South Korea (KOR); L 1–3 | Did not advance | | | |

== Tennis ==
Men

| Athlete | Event | Round of 64 | Round of 32 | Round of 16 | Quarter-finals | Semi-finals | Final | |
| Athlete | Event | Opposition Score | Opposition Score | Opposition Score | Opposition Score | Opposition Score | Opposition Score | Rank |
|---|---|---|---|---|---|---|---|---|
| Coleman Wong | Singles | Bye | Bastola (NEP); W 6–2, 6–0 | Wu Yb (CHN); W 6–4, 3–6, 7–6^{(8–6)} | Hong S-c (KOR); L 6–4, 4–6, 3–6 | Did not advance | | |
| Wong Hong-kit | Singles | Bye | Fitriadi (INA); L 7–5, 4–6, 2–6 | Did not advance | | | | |
| Wong Hong-kit; Coleman Wong | Doubles | —N/a | Hong S-c / Kwon S-w (KOR); L 2–6, 2–6 | Did not advance | | | | |

Women

| Athlete | Event | Round of 64 | Round of 32 | Round of 16 | Quarter-finals | Semi-finals | Final | |
| Athlete | Event | Opposition Score | Opposition Score | Opposition Score | Opposition Score | Opposition Score | Opposition Score | Rank |
|---|---|---|---|---|---|---|---|---|
| Eudice Chong | Singles | Bye | Gumulya (INA); W 6–2, 6–0 | Park S-h (KOR); L 3–6, 3–6 | Did not advance | | | |
| Adithya Karunaratne | Singles | Bye | Iu SN (MAC); W 6–0, 6–0 | Raina (IND); L 1–6, 2–6 | Did not advance | | | |
| Eudice Chong; Cody Wong | Doubles | —N/a | Bye | Bhosale / Thandi (IND); W 6–4, 6–1 | Chan H-c / L Chan (TPE); L 3–6, 4–6 | Did not advance | | |
| Adithya Karunaratne; Wu Ho-ching | Doubles | —N/a | Chanta / Kovapitukted (THA); L 4–6, 0–6 | Did not advance | | | | |

Mixed

| Athlete | Event | Round of 64 | Round of 32 | Round of 16 | Quarter-finals | Semi-finals | Final | |
| Athlete | Event | Opposition Score | Opposition Score | Opposition Score | Opposition Score | Opposition Score | Opposition Score | Rank |
|---|---|---|---|---|---|---|---|---|
| Eudice Chong; Coleman Wong | Doubles | Bye | Lau / Tang (MAC); W 6–3, 6–0 | Chan / Hsu (TPE); L 2–6, 4–6 | Did not advance | | | |
| Cody Wong; Wong Hong-kit | Doubles | Bye | Han N-l / Chung Y-s (KOR); L 2–6, 1–6 | Did not advance | | | | |

== Wushu ==
=== Taolu ===
| Athlete | Event | Event 1 | | Event 2 | | Total | Rank |
| Athlete | Event | Result | Rank | Result | Rank | Total | Rank |
|---|---|---|---|---|---|---|---|
| Lau Chi Lung | Men's nanquan and nangun | 9.730 | 17 | 9.616 | 13 | 19.346 | 11 |
| Samuel Hui | Men's taijiquan and taijijian | 9.743 | 4 | 9.750 | 2 | 19.493 | 2nd place, silver medalist(s) |
| Liu Xuxu | Women's changquan | 9.756 | 2 | —N/a | | 9.756 | 2nd place, silver medalist(s) |
| He Jianxin | Women's nanquan and nandao | 9.673 | 6 | 9.690 | 4 | 19.363 | 5 |
| Chen Sui-jin | Women's taijiquan and taijijian | 9.746 | 2 | 9.730 | 4 | 19.476 | 3rd place, bronze medalist(s) |
| Juanita Mok | Women's taijiquan and taijijian | 9.633 | 9 | 9.730 | 4 | 19.363 | 7 |
| Lydia Sham Hui-yu | Women's jianshu and qiangshu | 9.716 | 3 | 9.610 | 8 | 19.326 | 6 |
