= Fencing at the 2022 Asian Games =

Events of the 2022 Asian Games

- Venue: Hangzhou Dianzi University Gymnasium
- Dates: 24–29 September 2023
- Competitors: 279 from 29 nations

Fencing competition at the 2022 Asian Games was held at Hangzhou Dianzi University Gymnasium, Hangzhou, China from 24 to 29 September 2023.

== Schedule ==
P	Pools	F	Finals

Event↓/Date →	24th Sun		25th Mon		26th Tue		27th Wed	28th Thu	29th Fri
Men's individual épée					P	F			
Men's team épée									F
Men's individual foil	P	F							
Men's team foil							F		
Men's individual sabre			P	F					
Men's team sabre								F	
Women's individual épée	P	F							
Women's team épée							F		
Women's individual foil			P	F					
Women's team foil								F	
Women's individual sabre					P	F			
Women's team sabre									F

== Medalists ==
=== Men ===
Event	Gold	Silver	Bronze
Individual épée	Koki Kano; Japan	Akira Komata; Japan	Ho Wai Hang; Hong Kong
Individual épée	Koki Kano; Japan	Akira Komata; Japan	Elmir Alimzhanov; Kazakhstan
Team épée	Japan; Koki Kano; Akira Komata; Ryu Matsumoto; Masaru Yamada	Kazakhstan; Elmir Alimzhanov; Ruslan Kurbanov; Yerlik Sertay; Vadim Sharlaimov	South Korea; Kim Jae-won; Kweon Young-jun; Ma Se-geon; Son Tae-jin
Team épée	Japan; Koki Kano; Akira Komata; Ryu Matsumoto; Masaru Yamada	Kazakhstan; Elmir Alimzhanov; Ruslan Kurbanov; Yerlik Sertay; Vadim Sharlaimov	Hong Kong; Fong Hoi Sun; Ho Wai Hang; Lau Ho Fung; Ng Ho Tin
Individual foil	Cheung Ka Long; Hong Kong	Chen Haiwei; China	Takahiro Shikine; Japan
Individual foil	Cheung Ka Long; Hong Kong	Chen Haiwei; China	Ryan Choi; Hong Kong
Team foil	South Korea; Ha Tae-gyu; Heo Jun; Im Cheol-woo; Lee Kwang-hyun	China; Chen Haiwei; Wu Bin; Xu Jie; Zeng Zhaoran	Hong Kong; Cheung Ka Long; Nicholas Choi; Ryan Choi; Yeung Chi Ka
Team foil	South Korea; Ha Tae-gyu; Heo Jun; Im Cheol-woo; Lee Kwang-hyun	China; Chen Haiwei; Wu Bin; Xu Jie; Zeng Zhaoran	Japan; Kazuki Iimura; Kyosuke Matsuyama; Takahiro Shikine; Kenta Suzumura
Individual sabre	Oh Sang-uk; South Korea	Gu Bon-gil; South Korea	Mohammad Rahbari; Iran
Individual sabre	Oh Sang-uk; South Korea	Gu Bon-gil; South Korea	Yousef Al-Shamlan; Kuwait
Team sabre	South Korea; Gu Bon-gil; Kim Jun-ho; Kim Jung-hwan; Oh Sang-uk	China; Liang Jianhao; Lin Xiao; Shen Chenpeng; Yan Yinghui	Kazakhstan; Zhanat Nabiyev; Mukhamedali Rakhmanali; Artyom Sarkissyan; Nazarbay Sattarkhan
Team sabre	South Korea; Gu Bon-gil; Kim Jun-ho; Kim Jung-hwan; Oh Sang-uk	China; Liang Jianhao; Lin Xiao; Shen Chenpeng; Yan Yinghui	Iran; Farzad Baher; Mohammad Fotouhi; Ali Pakdaman; Mohammad Rahbari

=== Women ===
Event	Gold	Silver	Bronze
Individual épée	Choi In-jeong; South Korea	Song Se-ra; South Korea	Vivian Kong; Hong Kong
Individual épée	Choi In-jeong; South Korea	Song Se-ra; South Korea	Dilnaz Murzataeva; Uzbekistan
Team épée	South Korea; Choi In-jeong; Kang Young-mi; Lee Hye-in; Song Se-ra	Hong Kong; Chan Wai Ling; Chu Ka Mong; Kaylin Hsieh; Vivian Kong	China; Shi Yuexin; Sun Yiwen; Tang Junyao; Xu Nuo
Team épée	South Korea; Choi In-jeong; Kang Young-mi; Lee Hye-in; Song Se-ra	Hong Kong; Chan Wai Ling; Chu Ka Mong; Kaylin Hsieh; Vivian Kong	Japan; Haruna Baba; Hana Saito; Nozomi Sato; Miho Yoshimura
Individual foil	Huang Qianqian; China	Yuka Ueno; Japan	Daphne Chan; Hong Kong
Individual foil	Huang Qianqian; China	Yuka Ueno; Japan	Hong Se-na; South Korea
Team foil	China; Chen Qingyuan; Huang Qianqian; Wang Yingying; Wang Yuting	South Korea; Chae Song-oh; Hong Hyo-jin; Hong Se-na; Hong Seo-in	Japan; Sera Azuma; Komaki Kikuchi; Karin Miyawaki; Yuka Ueno
Team foil	China; Chen Qingyuan; Huang Qianqian; Wang Yingying; Wang Yuting	South Korea; Chae Song-oh; Hong Hyo-jin; Hong Se-na; Hong Seo-in	Hong Kong; Daphne Chan; Valerie Cheng; Kuan Yu Ching; Sophia Wu
Individual sabre	Yoon Ji-su; South Korea	Shao Yaqi; China	Seri Ozaki; Japan
Individual sabre	Yoon Ji-su; South Korea	Shao Yaqi; China	Zaynab Dayibekova; Uzbekistan
Team sabre	Uzbekistan; Zaynab Dayibekova; Fernanda Herrera; Gulistan Perdebaeva; Paola Pliego	Japan; Misaki Emura; Shihomi Fukushima; Kanae Kobayashi; Seri Ozaki	China; Lin Kesi; Shao Yaqi; Yang Hengyu; Zhang Xinyi
Team sabre	Uzbekistan; Zaynab Dayibekova; Fernanda Herrera; Gulistan Perdebaeva; Paola Pliego	Japan; Misaki Emura; Shihomi Fukushima; Kanae Kobayashi; Seri Ozaki	South Korea; Choi Se-bin; Hong Ha-eun; Jeon Eun-hye; Yoon Ji-su

== Medal table ==
Rank	Nation	Gold	Silver	Bronze	Total
1	South Korea (KOR)	6	3	3	12
2	China (CHN)	2	4	2	8
3	Japan (JPN)	2	3	5	10
4	Hong Kong (HKG)	1	1	7	9
5	Uzbekistan (UZB)	1	0	2	3
6	Kazakhstan (KAZ)	0	1	2	3
7	Iran (IRI)	0	0	2	2
8	Kuwait (KUW)	0	0	1	1
Totals (8 entries)		12	12	24	48

== Participating nations ==
A total of 279 athletes from 29 nations competed in fencing at the 2022 Asian Games:

- Bangladesh (3)
- Cambodia (2)
- China (24)
- Chinese Taipei (4)
- Hong Kong (24)
- India (9)
- Indonesia (1)
- Iran (4)
- Iraq (2)
- Japan (24)
- Jordan (6)
- Kazakhstan (16)
- Kuwait (9)
- Kyrgyzstan (5)
- Lebanon (1)
- Macau (7)
- Mongolia (8)
- Nepal (6)
- Pakistan (1)
- Philippines (6)
- Qatar (3)
- Saudi Arabia (12)
- Singapore (16)
- South Korea (24)
- Thailand (24)
- United Arab Emirates (8)
- Uzbekistan (20)
- Vietnam (8)
- Yemen (2)
