= Cycling at the 2022 Asian Games =

- Venue: Chun'an Jieshou Sports Centre
- Dates: 25 September – 5 October 2023
- Competitors: 264 from 24 nations

The cycling competitions of the 2022 Asian Games were held at Chun'an Jieshou Sports Centre in Chun'an County, China from 25 September to 5 October 2023.

== Schedule ==
Q	Qualification	E	Elimination rounds	F	Finals

Event↓/Date →	25th Mon	26th Tue			27th Wed		28th Thu		29th Fri		30th Sat	1st Sun		2nd Mon	3rd Tue	4th Wed	5th Thu
BMX racing
Men												Q	F				
Women												Q	F				
Mountain bike
Men's cross-country	F																
Women's cross-country	F																
Road
Men's road race																	F
Men's individual time trial															F		
Women's road race																F	
Women's individual time trial															F		
Track
Men's sprint					Q	E	E	F									
Men's keirin									E	F							
Men's omnium							F										
Men's madison									F								
Men's team sprint		Q	E	F													
Men's team pursuit		Q		E	F												
Women's sprint							Q	E	E	F							
Women's keirin					E	F											
Women's omnium									F								
Women's madison							F										
Women's team sprint		Q	E	F													
Women's team pursuit		Q		E	F												

== Medalists ==
=== BMX racing ===
Event	Gold	Silver	Bronze
Men	Asuma Nakai; Japan	Komet Sukprasert; Thailand	Patrick Coo; Philippines
Women	Amellya Nur Sifa; Indonesia	Gu Quanquan; China	Jasmine Azzahra Setyobudi; Indonesia

=== Mountain bike ===
Event	Gold	Silver	Bronze
Men's cross-country	Mi Jiujiang; China	Yuan Jinwei; China	Toki Sawada; Japan
Women's cross-country	Li Hongfeng; China	Ma Caixia; China	Faranak Partoazar; Iran

=== Road ===
Event	Gold	Silver	Bronze
Men's road race	Yevgeniy Fedorov; Kazakhstan	Alexey Lutsenko; Kazakhstan	Sainbayaryn Jambaljamts; Mongolia
Men's individual time trial	Alexey Lutsenko; Kazakhstan	Xue Ming; China	Vincent Lau; Hong Kong
Women's road race	Yang Qianyu; Hong Kong	Na Ah-reum; South Korea	Jutatip Maneephan; Thailand
Women's individual time trial	Olga Zabelinskaya; Uzbekistan	Eri Yonamine; Japan	Rinata Sultanova; Kazakhstan

=== Track ===
Event	Gold	Silver	Bronze
Men's sprint	Kaiya Ota; Japan	Zhou Yu; China	Shah Firdaus Sahrom; Malaysia
Men's keirin	Zhou Yu; China	Kang Seo-jun; South Korea	Shah Firdaus Sahrom; Malaysia
Men's omnium	Kazushige Kuboki; Japan	Leung Ka Yu; Hong Kong	Ahmed Al-Mansoori; United Arab Emirates
Men's madison	Japan; Naoki Kojima; Shunsuke Imamura	South Korea; Shin Dong-in; Kim Eu-ro	Kazakhstan; Artyom Zakharov; Ramis Dinmukhametov
Men's team sprint	Japan; Yoshitaku Nagasako; Kaiya Ota; Yuta Obara; Shinji Nakano	China; Guo Shuai; Zhou Yu; Liu Qi; Xue Chenxi	Malaysia; Umar Hasbullah; Ridwan Sahrom; Fadhil Zonis
Men's team pursuit	Japan; Shoi Matsuda; Kazushige Kuboki; Eiya Hashimoto; Naoki Kojima; Shunsuke Imamura	China; Sun Haijiao; Yang Yang; Zhang Haiao; Sun Wentao	South Korea; Kim Hyeon-seok; Min Kyeong-ho; Jang Hun; Shin Dong-in
Women's sprint	Mina Sato; Japan	Yuan Liying; China	Riyu Ota; Japan
Women's keirin	Mina Sato; Japan	Wang Lijuan; China	Zhang Linyin; China
Women's omnium	Yumi Kajihara; Japan	Lee Sze Wing; Hong Kong	Liu Jiali; China
Women's madison	Japan; Tsuyaka Uchino; Maho Kakita	Hong Kong; Yang Qianyu; Lee Sze Wing	South Korea; Na Ah-reum; Lee Ju-mi
Women's team sprint	China; Guo Yufang; Bao Shanju; Yuan Liying; Jiang Yulu	South Korea; Hwang Hyeon-seo; Kim Ha-eun; Cho Sun-young; Lee Hye-jin	Malaysia; Nurul Aliana Syafika Azizan; Nurul Izzah Izzati Asri; Anis Amira Rosidi
Women's team pursuit	Japan; Yumi Kajihara; Mizuki Ikeda; Tsuyaka Uchino; Maho Kakita	China; Wang Susu; Wei Suwan; Wang Xiaoyue; Zhang Hongjie	Hong Kong; Lee Sze Wing; Yang Qianyu; Leung Bo Yee; Leung Wing Yee

== Medal table ==
Rank	Nation	Gold	Silver	Bronze	Total
1	Japan (JPN)	11	1	2	14
2	China (CHN)	4	10	2	16
3	Kazakhstan (KAZ)	2	1	2	5
4	Hong Kong (HKG)	1	3	2	6
5	Indonesia (INA)	1	0	1	2
6	Uzbekistan (UZB)	1	0	0	1
7	South Korea (KOR)	0	4	2	6
8	Thailand (THA)	0	1	1	2
9	Malaysia (MAS)	0	0	4	4
10	Iran (IRI)	0	0	1	1
10	Mongolia (MGL)	0	0	1	1
10	Philippines (PHI)	0	0	1	1
10	United Arab Emirates (UAE)	0	0	1	1
Totals (13 entries)		20	20	20	60

== Participating nations ==
A total of 264 athletes from 24 nations competed in cycling at the 2022 Asian Games:

- Afghanistan (2)
- Bahrain (4)
- China (36)
- Chinese Taipei (11)
- Hong Kong (18)
- India (13)
- Indonesia (14)
- Iran (2)
- Japan (21)
- Kazakhstan (23)
- Kuwait (4)
- Laos (3)
- Macau (5)
- Malaysia (11)
- Mongolia (5)
- Nepal (2)
- Philippines (9)
- Qatar (3)
- Singapore (2)
- South Korea (28)
- Thailand (23)
- United Arab Emirates (8)
- Uzbekistan (13)
- Vietnam (4)
