= 2023 Asian Fencing Championships =

Fencing Championship

- Host city: Wuxi, China
- Dates: 17–22 June 2023
- Main venue: Taihu International Expo Center

The 2023 Asian Fencing Championships were held in Wuxi, China from 17 to 22 June 2023 at the Taihu International Expo Center.

== Medal summary ==
=== Men ===
Event	Gold	Silver	Bronze
Individual épée	Koki Kano; Japan	Yu Lefan; China	Kim Jae-won; South Korea
Individual épée	Koki Kano; Japan	Yu Lefan; China	Akira Komata; Japan
Team épée	Japan; Koki Kano; Akira Komata; Ryu Matsumoto; Masaru Yamada	Kazakhstan; Elmir Alimzhanov; Ruslan Kurbanov; Yerlik Sertay; Vadim Sharlaimov	South Korea; Kim Jae-won; Kweon Young-jun; Ma Se-geon; Son Tae-jin
Team épée	Japan; Koki Kano; Akira Komata; Ryu Matsumoto; Masaru Yamada	Kazakhstan; Elmir Alimzhanov; Ruslan Kurbanov; Yerlik Sertay; Vadim Sharlaimov	Hong Kong; Nicholas Chau; Fong Hoi Sun; Ho Wai Hang; Ng Ho Tin
Individual foil	Mo Ziwei; China	Ha Tae-gyu; South Korea	Yeung Chi Ka; Hong Kong
Individual foil	Mo Ziwei; China	Ha Tae-gyu; South Korea	Heo Jun; South Korea
Team foil	Japan; Kazuki Iimura; Kyosuke Matsuyama; Takahiro Shikine; Kenta Suzumura	South Korea; Ha Tae-gyu; Heo Jun; Im Cheol-woo; Lee Kwang-hyun	China; Chen Haiwei; Mo Ziwei; Xu Jie; Zeng Zhaoran
Team foil	Japan; Kazuki Iimura; Kyosuke Matsuyama; Takahiro Shikine; Kenta Suzumura	South Korea; Ha Tae-gyu; Heo Jun; Im Cheol-woo; Lee Kwang-hyun	Hong Kong; Cheung Ka Long; Ryan Choi; Leung Chin Yu; Yeung Chi Ka
Individual sabre	Ali Pakdaman; Iran	Kim Jun-ho; South Korea	Mohammad Rahbari; Iran
Individual sabre	Ali Pakdaman; Iran	Kim Jun-ho; South Korea	Low Ho Tin; Hong Kong
Team sabre	South Korea; Gu Bon-gil; Kim Jung-hwan; Kim Jun-ho; Oh Sang-uk	Iran; Farzad Baher; Mohammad Fotouhi; Ali Pakdaman; Mohammad Rahbari	China; Liang Jianhao; Lin Xiao; Shen Chenpeng; Yan Yinghui
Team sabre	South Korea; Gu Bon-gil; Kim Jung-hwan; Kim Jun-ho; Oh Sang-uk	Iran; Farzad Baher; Mohammad Fotouhi; Ali Pakdaman; Mohammad Rahbari	Japan; Mao Kokubo; Kaito Streets; Hayato Tsubo; Kento Yoshida

=== Women ===
Event	Gold	Silver	Bronze
Individual épée	Vivian Kong; Hong Kong	Song Se-ra; South Korea	Lin Sheng; China
Individual épée	Vivian Kong; Hong Kong	Song Se-ra; South Korea	Choi In-jeong; South Korea
Team épée	South Korea; Choi In-jeong; Kang Young-mi; Lee Hye-in; Song Se-ra	Hong Kong; Chan Wai Ling; Chu Ka Mong; Kaylin Hsieh; Vivian Kong	China; Lin Sheng; Sun Yiwen; Tang Junyao; Zhu Mingye
Team épée	South Korea; Choi In-jeong; Kang Young-mi; Lee Hye-in; Song Se-ra	Hong Kong; Chan Wai Ling; Chu Ka Mong; Kaylin Hsieh; Vivian Kong	Japan; Haruna Baba; Hana Saito; Nozomi Sato; Miho Yoshimura
Individual foil	Chen Qingyuan; China	Sera Azuma; Japan	Shi Yue; China
Individual foil	Chen Qingyuan; China	Sera Azuma; Japan	Amita Berthier; Singapore
Team foil	Japan; Sera Azuma; Komaki Kikuchi; Karin Miyawaki; Yuka Ueno	China; Cai Yuanting; Chen Qingyuan; Fu Yiting; Huang Qianqian	Hong Kong; Daphne Chan; Valerie Cheng; Kuan Yu Ching; Sophia Wu
Team foil	Japan; Sera Azuma; Komaki Kikuchi; Karin Miyawaki; Yuka Ueno	China; Cai Yuanting; Chen Qingyuan; Fu Yiting; Huang Qianqian	Singapore; Amita Berthier; Cheung Kemei; Tay Yu Ling; Maxine Wong
Individual sabre	Zaynab Dayibekova; Uzbekistan	Yoon Ji-su; South Korea	Yang Hengyu; China
Individual sabre	Zaynab Dayibekova; Uzbekistan	Yoon Ji-su; South Korea	Bhavani Devi; India
Team sabre	South Korea; Choi Se-bin; Hong Ha-eun; Jeon Eun-hye; Yoon Ji-su	China; Fu Ying; Shao Yaqi; Yang Hengyu; Zhang Xinyi	Japan; Misaki Emura; Shihomi Fukushima; Seri Ozaki; Risa Takashima
Team sabre	South Korea; Choi Se-bin; Hong Ha-eun; Jeon Eun-hye; Yoon Ji-su	China; Fu Ying; Shao Yaqi; Yang Hengyu; Zhang Xinyi	Hong Kong; Au Sin Ying; Chu Wing Kiu; Laren Leung; Summer Fay Sit

== Medal table ==
Rank	Nation	Gold	Silver	Bronze	Total
1	Japan	4	1	4	9
2	South Korea	3	5	4	12
3	China	2	3	6	11
4	Hong Kong	1	1	6	8
5	Iran	1	1	1	3
6	Uzbekistan	1	0	0	1
7	Kazakhstan	0	1	0	1
8	Singapore	0	0	2	2
9	India	0	0	1	1
Totals (9 entries)		12	12	24	48

== Results ==
=== Men ===
==== Individual épée ====
Quarterfinals		Semifinals		Final
Koki Kano (JPN)	15
Kazuyasu Minobe (JPN)	11	Koki Kano (JPN)	15
Kim Jae-won (KOR)	15	Kim Jae-won (KOR)	7
Lan Minghao (CHN)	11			Koki Kano (JPN)	15
Elmir Alimzhanov (KAZ)	9			Yu Lefan (CHN)	10
Yu Lefan (CHN)	15	Yu Lefan (CHN)	12
Akira Komata (JPN)	15	Akira Komata (JPN)	11
Fayzulla Alimov (UZB)	14

==== Team épée ====
Quarterfinals
South Korea	45
Singapore	36
Uzbekistan	40
Kazakhstan	45
China	42
Hong Kong	45
Kyrgyzstan	22
Japan	45

Semifinals
South Korea	36
Kazakhstan	42
Hong Kong	26
Japan	45

Final
Kazakhstan	25
Japan	45
3rd place
South Korea	45
Hong Kong	25

==== Individual foil ====
Quarterfinals		Semifinals		Final
Chen Haiwei (CHN)	12
Yeung Chi Ka (HKG)	15	Yeung Chi Ka (HKG)	8
Mo Ziwei (CHN)	15	Mo Ziwei (CHN)	15
Lee Kwang-hyun (KOR)	13			Mo Ziwei (CHN)	15
Kazuki Iimura (JPN)	9			Ha Tae-gyu (KOR)	9
Ha Tae-gyu (KOR)	15	Ha Tae-gyu (KOR)	15
Kyosuke Matsuyama (JPN)	8	Heo Jun (KOR)	6
Heo Jun (KOR)	15

==== Team foil ====
Quarterfinals
Japan	45
Kuwait	18
Singapore	25
China	45
Hong Kong	45
Chinese Taipei	35
India	17
South Korea	45

Semifinals
Japan	45
China	41
Hong Kong	35
South Korea	45

Final
Japan	45
South Korea	38
3rd place
China	45
Hong Kong	41

==== Individual sabre ====
Quarterfinals		Semifinals		Final
Musa Aymuratov (UZB)	4
Mohammad Rahbari (IRI)	15	Mohammad Rahbari (IRI)	12
Kim Jun-ho (KOR)	15	Kim Jun-ho (KOR)	15
Yousef Al-Shamlan (KUW)	11			Kim Jun-ho (KOR)	14
Ali Pakdaman (IRI)	15			Ali Pakdaman (IRI)	15
Kento Yoshida (JPN)	13	Ali Pakdaman (IRI)	15
Low Ho Tin (HKG)	15	Low Ho Tin (HKG)	10
Oh Sang-uk (KOR)	11

==== Team sabre ====
Quarterfinals
South Korea	45
Saudi Arabia	30
Kazakhstan	26
China	45
Japan	45
Hong Kong	33
Kuwait
Iran	WO

Semifinals
South Korea	45
China	28
Japan	39
Iran	45

Final
South Korea	45
Iran	28
3rd place
China	45
Japan	39

=== Women ===
==== Individual épée ====
Quarterfinals		Semifinals		Final
Song Se-ra (KOR)	7
Kang Young-mi (KOR)	6	Song Se-ra (KOR)	14
Sun Yiwen (CHN)	7	Lin Sheng (CHN)	13
Lin Sheng (CHN)	8			Song Se-ra (KOR)	4
Kaylin Hsieh (HKG)	8			Vivian Kong (HKG)	15
Choi In-jeong (KOR)	9	Choi In-jeong (KOR)	11
Vivian Kong (HKG)	10	Vivian Kong (HKG)	15
Zhu Mingye (CHN)	9

==== Team épée ====
Quarterfinals
South Korea	45
India	25
Chinese Taipei	33
Japan	45
China	45
Singapore	28
Thailand	23
Hong Kong	45

Semifinals
South Korea	45
Japan	36
China	29
Hong Kong	34

Final
South Korea	39
Hong Kong	31
3rd place
Japan	36
China	45

==== Individual foil ====
Quarterfinals		Semifinals		Final
Karin Miyawaki (JPN)	14
Shi Yue (CHN)	15	Shi Yue (CHN)	9
Hong Hyo-jin (KOR)	8	Sera Azuma (JPN)	15
Sera Azuma (JPN)	15			Sera Azuma (JPN)	12
Fu Yiting (CHN)	5			Chen Qingyuan (CHN)	15
Chen Qingyuan (CHN)	15	Chen Qingyuan (CHN)	15
Amita Berthier (SGP)	15	Amita Berthier (SGP)	8
Hong Seo-in (KOR)	10

==== Team foil ====
Quarterfinals
Japan	45
Philippines	11
Australia	30
Singapore	45
South Korea	38
Hong Kong	45
Macau	24
China	45

Semifinals
Japan	45
Singapore	27
Hong Kong	32
China	41

Final
Japan	45
China	27
3rd place
Singapore	33
Hong Kong	45

==== Individual sabre ====
Quarterfinals		Semifinals		Final
Yoon Ji-su (KOR)	15
Choi Se-bin (KOR)	6	Yoon Ji-su (KOR)	15
Yang Hengyu (CHN)	15	Yang Hengyu (CHN)	8
Risa Takashima (JPN)	14			Yoon Ji-su (KOR)	9
Bhavani Devi (IND)	15			Zaynab Dayibekova (UZB)	15
Misaki Emura (JPN)	10	Bhavani Devi (IND)	14
Veronika Vasileva (AUS)	9	Zaynab Dayibekova (UZB)	15
Zaynab Dayibekova (UZB)	15

==== Team sabre ====
Quarterfinals
South Korea	45
Singapore	32
Hong Kong	45
Kazakhstan	34
China	45
Uzbekistan	24
Iran	21
Japan	45

Semifinals
South Korea	45
Hong Kong	34
China	45
Japan	41

Final
South Korea	45
China	40
3rd place
Hong Kong	43
Japan	45
