= Fencing at the 2022 Asian Games – Men's team foil =

Men's team foil at the 2022 Asian Games
- Venue: Hangzhou Dianzi University Gymnasium
- Date: 27 September 2023
- Competitors: 42 from 11 nations

Medalists
gold medal	South Korea; Ha Tae-gyu, Heo Jun, Im Cheol-woo, Lee Kwang-hyun
silver medal	China; Chen Haiwei, Wu Bin, Xu Jie, Zeng Zhaoran
bronze medal	Hong Kong; Cheung Ka Long, Nicholas Choi, Ryan Choi, Yeung Chi Ka
bronze medal	Japan; Kazuki Iimura, Kyosuke Matsuyama, Takahiro Shikine, Kenta Suzumura

The men's team foil competition at the 2022 Asian Games in Hangzhou was held on 27 September 2023 at the Hangzhou Dianzi University Gymnasium.

== Schedule ==
All times are China Standard Time (UTC+08:00)

Date	Time	Event
Wednesday, 27 September 2023	09:00	Table of 16
Wednesday, 27 September 2023	10:30	Quarterfinals
Wednesday, 27 September 2023	12:00	Semifinals
Wednesday, 27 September 2023	18:00	Gold medal match

== Seeding ==
The teams were seeded taking into account the results achieved by competitors representing each team in the individual event.

Rank	Team	Fencer		Total
Rank	Team	1	2	Total
1	Hong Kong (HKG)	1	3	4
2	China (CHN)	2	6	8
3	Japan (JPN)	3	5	8
4	South Korea (KOR)	7	9	16
5	Chinese Taipei (TPE)	8	12	20
6	Qatar (QAT)	10	11	21
7	Uzbekistan (UZB)	13	24	37
8	Singapore (SGP)	17	21	38
9	India (IND)	16	23	39
10	Thailand (THA)	18	25	43
11	Macau (MAC)	22	29	51

== Results ==
Table of 16
9	India	30
8	Singapore	45
11	Macau	32
6	Qatar	45
7	Uzbekistan	45
10	Thailand	26

Quarterfinals
1	Hong Kong	45
8	Singapore	34
5	Chinese Taipei	29
4	South Korea	45
3	Japan	45
6	Qatar	30
7	Uzbekistan	26
2	China	45

Semifinals
1	Hong Kong	37
4	South Korea	45
3	Japan	44
2	China	45

Gold medal match
4	South Korea	45
2	China	38

== Final standing ==
Rank	Team
1st place, gold medalist(s)	South Korea (KOR); Ha Tae-gyu; Heo Jun; Im Cheol-woo; Lee Kwang-hyun
2nd place, silver medalist(s)	China (CHN); Chen Haiwei; Wu Bin; Xu Jie; Zeng Zhaoran
3rd place, bronze medalist(s)	Hong Kong (HKG); Cheung Ka Long; Nicholas Choi; Ryan Choi; Yeung Chi Ka
3rd place, bronze medalist(s)	Japan (JPN); Kazuki Iimura; Kyosuke Matsuyama; Takahiro Shikine; Kenta Suzumura
5	Chinese Taipei (TPE); Chen Chih-chieh; Chen Yi-tung; Liu Yin-yuan; Yueh Che-hao
6	Qatar (QAT); Khaled Aref Hussein; Abdalla Khalifa; Ali Owaida
7	Uzbekistan (UZB); Mukhammad Yusuf Asranov; Ilyas Molina; Doniyor Sadullaev; Akhmadillokhon Solikhojiev
8	Singapore (SGP); Jonathan Au Eong; Kieren Lock; Samuel Robson; Raphael Tan
9	India (IND); Bibish Kathiresan; Akash Kumar; Dev Narwal; Arjun Verma
10	Thailand (THA); Ratchanavi Deejing; Bhumrapee Panyabaramee; Notethakod Wangpaisit; Prompiriya Yorsang
11	Macau (MAC); Lam Pak Kio; Ng Wai Kit; Wu Chong Him
