= Fencing at the 2022 Asian Games – Women's team foil =

Competition held at Asian Games

Women's team foil at the 2022 Asian Games
- Venue: Hangzhou Dianzi University Gymnasium
- Date: 28 September 2023
- Competitors: 31 from 8 nations

Medalists
gold medal	China; Chen Qingyuan, Huang Qianqian, Wang Yingying, Wang Yuting
silver medal	South Korea; Chae Song-oh, Hong Hyo-jin, Hong Se-na, Hong Seo-in
bronze medal	Japan; Sera Azuma, Komaki Kikuchi, Karin Miyawaki, Yuka Ueno
bronze medal	Hong Kong; Daphne Chan, Valerie Cheng, Kuan Yu Ching, Sophia Wu

The women's team foil competition at the 2022 Asian Games in Hangzhou was held on 28 September 2023 at the Hangzhou Dianzi University Gymnasium.

== Schedule ==
All times are China Standard Time (UTC+08:00)

Date	Time	Event
Thursday, 28 September 2022	12:00	Quarterfinals
Thursday, 28 September 2022	13:30	Semifinals
Thursday, 28 September 2022	18:35	Gold medal match

== Seeding ==
The teams were seeded taking into account the results achieved by competitors representing each team in the individual event.

Rank	Team	Fencer		Total
Rank	Team	1	2	Total
1	Japan (JPN)	2	6	8
2	Hong Kong (HKG)	3	5	8
3	South Korea (KOR)	3	7	10
4	China (CHN)	1	10	11
5	Singapore (SGP)	8	12	20
6	Macau (MAC)	11	12	23
7	Thailand (THA)	14	15	29
8	Nepal (NEP)	19	20	39

== Results ==
Quarterfinals			Semifinals			Gold medal match
1	Japan	45
8	Nepal	10	1	Japan	29
5	Singapore	37	4	China	45
4	China	45				4	China	34
3	South Korea	45				3	South Korea	31
6	Macau	10	3	South Korea	45
7	Thailand	15	2	Hong Kong	25
2	Hong Kong	45

== Final standing ==
Rank	Team
1st place, gold medalist(s)	China (CHN); Chen Qingyuan; Huang Qianqian; Wang Yingying; Wang Yuting
2nd place, silver medalist(s)	South Korea (KOR); Chae Song-oh; Hong Hyo-jin; Hong Se-na; Hong Seo-in
3rd place, bronze medalist(s)	Japan (JPN); Sera Azuma; Komaki Kikuchi; Karin Miyawaki; Yuka Ueno
3rd place, bronze medalist(s)	Hong Kong (HKG); Daphne Chan; Valerie Cheng; Kuan Yu Ching; Sophia Wu
5	Singapore (SGP); Amita Berthier; Cheung Kemei; Tay Yu Ling; Maxine Wong
6	Macau (MAC); Iec Pek Chan; Ku Hio Lam; Tam Ka Ioi; Tang Nga Hei
7	Thailand (THA); Sasinpat Doungpattra; Naramol Longthong; Chayanutphat Shinnakerdchoke; Chayada Smithisukul
8	Nepal (NEP); Goma Acharya; Anita Adhikari; Mandira Thapa
