= Fencing at the 2022 Asian Games – Women's individual foil =

Women's individual foil at the 2022 Asian Games
- Venue: Hangzhou Dianzi University Gymnasium
- Date: 25 September 2023
- Competitors: 21 from 12 nations

Medalists
gold medal	Huang Qianqian	China
silver medal	Yuka Ueno	Japan
bronze medal	Daphne Chan	Hong Kong
bronze medal	Hong Se-na	South Korea

The women's individual foil competition at the 2022 Asian Games in Hangzhou was held on 25 September 2023 at the Hangzhou Dianzi University Gymnasium.

== Schedule ==
All times are China Standard Time (UTC+08:00)

Date	Time	Event
Monday, 25 September 2023	12:30	Round of pools
Monday, 25 September 2023	14:45	Table of 16
Monday, 25 September 2023	15:45	Quarterfinals
Monday, 25 September 2023	18:45	Semifinals
Monday, 25 September 2023	20:15	Gold medal bout

== Results ==
=== Round of pools ===
==== Pool 1 ====
Athlete	JPN	KOR	HKG	MAC	JOR	THA	NEP
Sera Azuma (JPN)	—	5–4	4–5	3–5	5–0	5–1	5–0
Hong Hyo-jin (KOR)	4–5	—	3–5	5–1	5–1	3–5	5–0
Daphne Chan (HKG)	5–4	5–3	—	5–1	5–0	5–0	5–0
Ku Hio Lam (MAC)	5–3	1–5	1–5	—	4–5	5–1	5–1
Roaa Majali (JOR)	0–5	1–5	0–5	5–4	—	4–5	5–1
Chayada Smithisukul (THA)	1–5	5–3	0–5	1–5	5–4	—	5–3
Mandira Thapa (NEP)	0–5	0–5	0–5	1–5	1–5	3–5	—

==== Pool 2 ====
Athlete	JPN	CHN	KOR	SGP	THA	NEP	UAE
Yuka Ueno (JPN)	—	5–3	4–5	5–2	5–0	5–1	5–0
Huang Qianqian (CHN)	3–5	—	5–1	5–1	5–0	5–0	5–1
Hong Se-na (KOR)	5–4	1–5	—	5–1	4–5	5–3	5–0
Maxine Wong (SGP)	2–5	1–5	1–5	—	5–1	5–4	5–1
Chayanutphat Shinnakerdchoke (THA)	0–5	0–5	5–4	1–5	—	5–1	5–2
Goma Acharya (NEP)	1–5	0–5	3–5	4–5	1–5	—	2–5
Al-Hayam Al-Blooshi (UAE)	0–5	1–5	0–5	1–5	2–5	5–2	—

==== Pool 3 ====
Athlete	CHN	SGP	HKG	UZB	MAC	UAE	CAM
Chen Qingyuan (CHN)	—	5–4	3–5	1–5	5–0	5–3	5–1
Amita Berthier (SGP)	4–5	—	4–5	4–5	4–5	5–0	5–0
Valerie Cheng (HKG)	5–3	5–4	—	3–5	5–1	5–1	5–0
Umida Ilyosova (UZB)	5–1	5–4	5–3	—	5–3	5–0	5–0
Iec Pek Chan (MAC)	0–5	5–4	1–5	3–5	—	5–1	5–1
Noora Al-Breiki (UAE)	3–5	0–5	1–5	0–5	1–5	—	5–2
Hai Sreysros (CAM)	1–5	0–5	0–5	0–5	1–5	2–5	—

==== Summary ====
Rank	Pool	Athlete	W	L	W/M	TD	TF
1	1	Daphne Chan (HKG)	6	0	1.000	+22	30
2	3	Umida Ilyosova (UZB)	6	0	1.000	+19	30
3	2	Huang Qianqian (CHN)	5	1	0.833	+20	28
4	2	Yuka Ueno (JPN)	5	1	0.833	+18	29
5	3	Valerie Cheng (HKG)	5	1	0.833	+14	28
6	1	Sera Azuma (JPN)	4	2	0.667	+12	27
7	2	Hong Se-na (KOR)	4	2	0.667	+7	25
8	3	Chen Qingyuan (CHN)	4	2	0.667	+6	24
9	1	Hong Hyo-jin (KOR)	3	3	0.500	+8	25
10	1	Ku Hio Lam (MAC)	3	3	0.500	+1	21
11	3	Iec Pek Chan (MAC)	3	3	0.500	–2	19
11	2	Maxine Wong (SGP)	3	3	0.500	–2	19
13	2	Chayanutphat Shinnakerdchoke (THA)	3	3	0.500	–6	16
14	1	Chayada Smithisukul (THA)	3	3	0.500	–8	17
15	3	Amita Berthier (SGP)	2	4	0.333	+6	26
16	1	Roaa Majali (JOR)	2	4	0.333	–10	15
17	3	Noora Al-Breiki (UAE)	1	5	0.167	–17	10
18	2	Al-Hayam Al-Blooshi (UAE)	1	5	0.167	–18	9
19	2	Goma Acharya (NEP)	0	6	0.000	−19	11
20	1	Mandira Thapa (NEP)	0	6	0.000	−25	5
21	3	Hai Sreysros (CAM)	0	6	0.000	−26	4

=== Knockout round ===
Table of 16
1	Daphne Chan (HKG)	15
16	Roaa Majali (JOR)	8
9	Hong Hyo-jin (KOR)	15
8	Chen Qingyuan (CHN)	11
5	Valerie Cheng (HKG)	15
12	Iec Pek Chan (MAC)	3
13	Chayanutphat Shinnakerdchoke (THA)	4
4	Yuka Ueno (JPN)	15
3	Huang Qianqian (CHN)	15
14	Chayada Smithisukul (THA)	7
11	Maxine Wong (SGP)	3
6	Sera Azuma (JPN)	15
7	Hong Se-na (KOR)	15
10	Ku Hio Lam (MAC)	11
15	Amita Berthier (SGP)	15
2	Umida Ilyosova (UZB)	14

Quarterfinals
1	Daphne Chan (HKG)	15
9	Hong Hyo-jin (KOR)	10
5	Valerie Cheng (HKG)	10
4	Yuka Ueno (JPN)	15
3	Huang Qianqian (CHN)	11
6	Sera Azuma (JPN)	10
7	Hong Se-na (KOR)	15
15	Amita Berthier (SGP)	11

Semifinals
1	Daphne Chan (HKG)	7
4	Yuka Ueno (JPN)	15
3	Huang Qianqian (CHN)	15
7	Hong Se-na (KOR)	8

Gold medal bout
4	Yuka Ueno (JPN)	8
3	Huang Qianqian (CHN)	15

== Final standing ==
Rank	Athlete
1st place, gold medalist(s)	Huang Qianqian (CHN)
2nd place, silver medalist(s)	Yuka Ueno (JPN)
3rd place, bronze medalist(s)	Daphne Chan (HKG)
3rd place, bronze medalist(s)	Hong Se-na (KOR)
5	Valerie Cheng (HKG)
6	Sera Azuma (JPN)
7	Hong Hyo-jin (KOR)
8	Amita Berthier (SGP)
9	Umida Ilyosova (UZB)
10	Chen Qingyuan (CHN)
11	Ku Hio Lam (MAC)
12	Iec Pek Chan (MAC)
12	Maxine Wong (SGP)
14	Chayanutphat Shinnakerdchoke (THA)
15	Chayada Smithisukul (THA)
16	Roaa Majali (JOR)
17	Noora Al-Breiki (UAE)
18	Al-Hayam Al-Blooshi (UAE)
19	Goma Acharya (NEP)
20	Mandira Thapa (NEP)
21	Hai Sreysros (CAM)
