= Cycling at the 2022 Asian Games – Women's road race =

Women's road race at the 2022 Asian Games
- Venue: Chun'an Jieshou Sports Centre
- Date: 4 October 2023
- Competitors: 29 from 16 nations

Medalists
gold medal	Yang Qianyu	Hong Kong
silver medal	Na Ah-reum	South Korea
bronze medal	Jutatip Maneephan	Thailand

The women's 139.7 kilometres road race competition at the 2022 Asian Games took place on 4 October 2023 in Chun'an Jieshou Sports Centre.

== Schedule ==
All times are China Standard Time (UTC+08:00)

Date	Time	Event
Wednesday, 4 October 2023	10:00	Final

== Results ==
Legend

- DNF — Did not finish

Rank	Athlete	Time
1st place, gold medalist(s)	Yang Qianyu (HKG)	3:36:07
2nd place, silver medalist(s)	Na Ah-reum (KOR)	3:36:07
3rd place, bronze medalist(s)	Jutatip Maneephan (THA)	3:36:07
4	Nguyễn Thị Thật (VIE)	3:36:07
5	Huang Ting-ying (TPE)	3:36:07
6	Maho Kakita (JPN)	3:36:07
7	Sun Jiajun (CHN)	3:36:07
8	Lee Sze Wing (HKG)	3:36:07
9	Hsiao Mei-yu (TPE)	3:36:07
10	Olga Zabelinskaya (UZB)	3:36:07
11	Nur Aisyah Zubir (MAS)	3:36:07
12	Au Hoi Ian (MAC)	3:36:07
13	Eri Yonamine (JPN)	3:36:07
14	Safia Al-Sayegh (UAE)	3:36:07
15	Yanina Kuskova (UZB)	3:36:07
16	Zeng Luyao (CHN)	3:36:07
17	Rinata Sultanova (KAZ)	3:36:07
18	Makhabbat Umutzhanova (KAZ)	3:36:07
19	Lee Eun-hee (KOR)	3:36:07
20	Phi Kun Pan (MAS)	3:36:07
21	Ayustina Delia Priatna (INA)	3:36:22
22	Nguyễn Thị Thi (VIE)	3:36:39
23	Chaniporn Batriya (THA)	3:37:22
24	Fariba Hashimi (AFG)	3:42:10
25	Latefa Al-Yaseen (KUW)	3:42:10
26	Zahra Hussain (UAE)	3:42:10
27	Jinjiibadamyn Anujin (MGL)	3:42:10
28	Yulduz Hashimi (AFG)	3:42:17
—	Taiba Al-Asfour (KUW)	DNF
