= Chae Song-oh =

South Korean fencer (born 1989)

Personal information
- Born: 22 March 1989 (age 37)

Fencing career
- Sport: Fencing
- Country: South Korea
- Hand: Right-handed
Medal record
Women's foil fencing
Representing South Korea
Asian Games
Bronze medal – third place	2018 Jakarta	Team
Silver medal – second place	2022 Hangzhou	Team
Asian Fencing Championships
Silver medal – second place	2019 Chiba	Team

Chae Song-oh (born 22 March 1989) is a South Korean fencer. She won one of the bronze medals in the women's team foil event at the 2018 Asian Games held in Jakarta, Indonesia.

In 2019, she won the silver medal in the women's team foil event at the Asian Fencing Championships held in Chiba, Japan. She also competed in the women's foil event at the 2019 World Fencing Championships held in Budapest, Hungary without winning a medal. She was eliminated in her first match by Anne Sauer of Germany.

She competed at the 2022 World Fencing Championships held in Cairo, Egypt.
