= Sailing at the 2022 Asian Games – Women's iQFoil =

Women's iQFoil at the 2022 Asian Games
- Venue: Xiangshan Sailing Centre
- Date: 21–27 September 2023
- Competitors: 5 from 5 nations

Medalists
gold medal	Huang Xianting	China
silver medal	Ma Kwan Ching	Hong Kong
bronze medal	Aticha Homraruen	Thailand

The women's iQFoil competition at the 2022 Asian Games was held from 21 to 27 September 2023 at Xiangshan Sailing Centre in Ningbo.

== Schedule ==
All times are China Standard Time (UTC+08:00)

Date	Time	Event
Thursday, 21 September 2023	11:04	Race 1–4
Friday, 22 September 2023	14:04	Race 5–8
Saturday, 23 September 2023	11:00	Race 9–12
Sunday, 24 September 2023	14:00	Race 13–14
Tuesday, 26 September 2023	11:04	Race 15–18
Wednesday, 27 September 2023	11:10	Semifinal
Wednesday, 27 September 2023	11:10	Final

== Results ==
Legend

- BFD — Black flag disqualification
- DNF — Did not finish
- DNS — Did not start
- RET — Retired
- UFD — U flag disqualification

=== Opening series ===
Rank	Athlete	Race																		Total
Rank	Athlete	1	2	3	4	5	6	7	8	9	10	11	12	13	14	15	16	17	18	Total
1	Huang Xianting (CHN)	1	1	1	1	1	1	~~(3)~~	~~(4)~~	1	1	1	~~(6)~~; BFD	1	1	1	1	1	1	15
2	Ma Kwan Ching (HKG)	2	2	2	2	2	2	1	1	2	2	2	~~(6)~~; BFD	~~(5)~~	~~(6)~~; DNS	2	2	2	2	28
3	Aticha Homraruen (THA)	3	3	3	3	3	3	2	2	3	~~(4)~~	~~(4)~~	1	2	~~(6)~~; DNF	3	4	4	3	42
4	Marsha Shahrin (SGP)	~~(4)~~	4	4	4	4	4	4	3	4	3	3	~~(6)~~; DNF	3	~~(6)~~; DNS	4	3	3	4	54
5	Arrianne Angela Paz (PHI)	5	5	~~(6)~~; UFD	5	5	~~(6)~~; RET	5	5	5	5	5	2	4	~~(6)~~; DNF	5	5	6 BFD	5	72

=== Medal series ===
Rank	Athlete	SF	Final
1st place, gold medalist(s)	Huang Xianting (CHN)	Bye	
2nd place, silver medalist(s)	Ma Kwan Ching (HKG)		
3rd place, bronze medalist(s)	Aticha Homraruen (THA)		
4	Marsha Shahrin (SGP)		
5	Arrianne Angela Paz (PHI)		

- No medal races were completed on 27 September as the wind conditions in the course area did not meet the requirement of racing. The medals were awarded based on the opening series ranking.
