= Fencing at the 2022 Asian Games – Men's individual foil =

Men's individual foil at the 2022 Asian Games
- Venue: Hangzhou Dianzi University Gymnasium
- Date: 24 September 2023
- Competitors: 29 from 16 nations

Medalists
gold medal	Cheung Ka Long	Hong Kong
silver medal	Chen Haiwei	China
bronze medal	Takahiro Shikine	Japan
bronze medal	Ryan Choi	Hong Kong

The men's individual foil competition at the 2022 Asian Games in Hangzhou was held on 24 September 2023 at the Hangzhou Dianzi University Gymnasium.

== Schedule ==
All times are China Standard Time (UTC+08:00)

Date	Time	Event
Sunday, 24 September 2023	09:00	Round of pools
Sunday, 24 September 2023	10:45	Table of 32
Sunday, 24 September 2023	12:00	Table of 16
Sunday, 24 September 2023	13:15	Quarterfinals
Sunday, 24 September 2023	18:00	Semifinals
Sunday, 24 September 2023	20:10	Gold medal bout

== Results ==
=== Round of pools ===
==== Pool 1 ====
Athlete	HKG	TPE	UZB	VIE	THA
Cheung Ka Long (HKG)	—	5–4	5–1	5–2	5–4
Chen Chih-chieh (TPE)	4–5	—	1–5	5–1	5–0
Mukhammad Yusuf Asranov (UZB)	1–5	5–1	—	5–3	3–5
Nguyễn Minh Quang (VIE)	2–5	1–5	3–5	—	1–5
Ratchanavi Deejing (THA)	4–5	0–5	5–3	5–1	—

==== Pool 2 ====
Athlete	JPN	TPE	UZB	QAT	MAC	SGP
Kyosuke Matsuyama (JPN)	—	5–2	5–1	5–1	5–1	5–0
Chen Yi-tung (TPE)	2–5	—	5–1	5–2	5–4	1–5
Doniyor Sadullaev (UZB)	1–5	1–5	—	3–5	5–0	3–5
Khaled Aref Hussein (QAT)	1–5	2–5	5–3	—	5–3	5–3
Lam Pak Kio (MAC)	1–5	4–5	0–5	3–5	—	1–5
Jonathan Au Eong (SGP)	0–5	5–1	5–3	3–5	5–1	—

==== Pool 3 ====
Athlete	HKG	KOR	LBN	IND	VIE	IRQ
Ryan Choi (HKG)	—	5–0	5–1	5–3	5–4	5–0
Im Cheol-woo (KOR)	0–5	—	5–0	5–1	5–3	5–2
Philippe Wakim (LBN)	1–5	0–5	—	4–5	5–0	5–3
Dev Narwal (IND)	3–5	1–5	5–4	—	0–5	5–4
Nguyễn Văn Hải (VIE)	4–5	3–5	0–5	5–0	—	5–4
Ghaith Ahmed (IRQ)	0–5	2–5	3–5	4–5	4–5	—

==== Pool 4 ====
Athlete	KOR	CHN	PHI	QAT	KUW	THA
Lee Kwang-hyun (KOR)	—	4–5	5–3	5–3	5–3	5–2
Xu Jie (CHN)	5–4	—	5–1	5–2	5–2	5–1
Sammuel Tranquilan (PHI)	3–5	1–5	—	1–5	5–2	5–2
Abdalla Khalifa (QAT)	3–5	2–5	5–1	—	5–2	5–3
Ali Fadel (KUW)	3–5	2–5	2–5	2–5	—	3–5
Notethakod Wangpaisit (THA)	2–5	1–5	2–5	3–5	5–3	—

==== Pool 5 ====
Athlete	JPN	CHN	IND	KUW	SGP	MAC
Takahiro Shikine (JPN)	—	1–5	5–2	5–4	3–5	5–0
Chen Haiwei (CHN)	5–1	—	5–2	5–2	5–3	5–0
Bibish Kathiresan (IND)	2–5	2–5	—	3–5	4–5	5–3
Ali Al-Nassar (KUW)	4–5	2–5	5–3	—	5–1	2–5
Kieren Lock (SGP)	5–3	3–5	5–4	1–5	—	2–5
Wu Chong Him (MAC)	0–5	0–5	3–5	5–2	5–2	—

==== Summary ====
Rank	Pool	Athlete	W	L	W/M	TD	TF
1	2	Kyosuke Matsuyama (JPN)	5	0	1.000	+20	25
2	5	Chen Haiwei (CHN)	5	0	1.000	+17	25
2	3	Ryan Choi (HKG)	5	0	1.000	+17	25
4	4	Xu Jie (CHN)	5	0	1.000	+15	25
5	1	Cheung Ka Long (HKG)	4	0	1.000	+9	20
6	3	Im Cheol-woo (KOR)	4	1	0.800	+9	20
7	4	Lee Kwang-hyun (KOR)	4	1	0.800	+8	24
8	4	Abdalla Khalifa (QAT)	3	2	0.600	+4	20
9	5	Takahiro Shikine (JPN)	3	2	0.600	+3	19
10	2	Jonathan Au Eong (SGP)	3	2	0.600	+3	18
11	2	Chen Yi-tung (TPE)	3	2	0.600	+1	18
12	2	Khaled Aref Hussein (QAT)	3	2	0.600	–1	18
13	1	Chen Chih-chieh (TPE)	2	2	0.500	+4	15
14	1	Mukhammad Yusuf Asranov (UZB)	2	2	0.500	0	14
14	1	Ratchanavi Deejing (THA)	2	2	0.500	0	14
16	5	Ali Al-Nassar (KUW)	2	3	0.400	−1	18
17	3	Nguyễn Văn Hải (VIE)	2	3	0.400	–2	17
18	3	Philippe Wakim (LBN)	2	3	0.400	−3	15
19	4	Sammuel Tranquilan (PHI)	2	3	0.400	−4	15
20	5	Kieren Lock (SGP)	2	3	0.400	−6	16
21	5	Wu Chong Him (MAC)	2	3	0.400	−6	13
22	3	Dev Narwal (IND)	2	3	0.400	−9	14
23	5	Bibish Kathiresan (IND)	1	4	0.200	−7	16
24	2	Doniyor Sadullaev (UZB)	1	4	0.200	−7	13
25	4	Notethakod Wangpaisit (THA)	1	4	0.200	−10	13
26	3	Ghaith Ahmed (IRQ)	0	5	0.000	−12	13
27	4	Ali Fadel (KUW)	0	5	0.000	−13	12
28	1	Nguyễn Minh Quang (VIE)	0	4	0.000	−13	7
29	2	Lam Pak Kio (MAC)	0	5	0.000	−16	9

=== Knockout round ===
==== Final ====
Gold medal bout
5	Cheung Ka Long (HKG)	15
3	Chen Haiwei (CHN)	2

==== Top half ====
Table of 32
17	Nguyễn Văn Hải (VIE)	6
16	Ali Al-Nassar (KUW)	15
21	Wu Chong Him (MAC)	12
12	Khaled Aref Hussein (QAT)	15
13	Chen Chih-chieh (TPE)	15
20	Kieren Lock (SGP)	14

Table of 16
1	Kyosuke Matsuyama (JPN)	15
16	Ali Al-Nassar (KUW)	2
9	Takahiro Shikine (JPN)	15
8	Abdalla Khalifa (QAT)	4
5	Cheung Ka Long (HKG)	15
12	Khaled Aref Hussein (QAT)	8
13	Chen Chih-chieh (TPE)	11
4	Xu Jie (CHN)	15

Quarterfinals
1	Kyosuke Matsuyama (JPN)	14
9	Takahiro Shikine (JPN)	15
5	Cheung Ka Long (HKG)	15
4	Xu Jie (CHN)	7

Semifinals
9	Takahiro Shikine (JPN)	14
5	Cheung Ka Long (HKG)	15

==== Bottom half ====
Table of 32
19	Sammuel Tranquilan (PHI)	12
14	Mukhammad Yusuf Asranov (UZB)	15
11	Chen Yi-tung (TPE)	15
22	Dev Narwal (IND)	8
23	Bibish Kathiresan (IND)	15
10	Jonathan Au Eong (SGP)	12
15	Ratchanavi Deejing (THA)	12
18	Philippe Wakim (LBN)	15

Table of 16
3	Chen Haiwei (CHN)	15
14	Mukhammad Yusuf Asranov (UZB)	12
11	Chen Yi-tung (TPE)	15
6	Im Cheol-woo (KOR)	14
7	Lee Kwang-hyun (KOR)	15
23	Bibish Kathiresan (IND)	5
18	Philippe Wakim (LBN)	8
2	Ryan Choi (HKG)	15

Quarterfinals
3	Chen Haiwei (CHN)	15
11	Chen Yi-tung (TPE)	14
7	Lee Kwang-hyun (KOR)	14
2	Ryan Choi (HKG)	15

Semifinals
3	Chen Haiwei (CHN)	15
2	Ryan Choi (HKG)	9

== Final standing ==
Rank	Athlete
1st place, gold medalist(s)	Cheung Ka Long (HKG)
2nd place, silver medalist(s)	Chen Haiwei (CHN)
3rd place, bronze medalist(s)	Takahiro Shikine (JPN)
3rd place, bronze medalist(s)	Ryan Choi (HKG)
5	Kyosuke Matsuyama (JPN)
6	Xu Jie (CHN)
7	Lee Kwang-hyun (KOR)
8	Chen Yi-tung (TPE)
9	Im Cheol-woo (KOR)
10	Abdalla Khalifa (QAT)
11	Khaled Aref Hussein (QAT)
12	Chen Chih-chieh (TPE)
13	Mukhammad Yusuf Asranov (UZB)
14	Ali Al-Nassar (KUW)
15	Philippe Wakim (LBN)
16	Bibish Kathiresan (IND)
17	Jonathan Au Eong (SGP)
18	Ratchanavi Deejing (THA)
19	Nguyễn Văn Hải (VIE)
20	Sammuel Tranquilan (PHI)
21	Kieren Lock (SGP)
22	Wu Chong Him (MAC)
23	Dev Narwal (IND)
24	Doniyor Sadullaev (UZB)
25	Notethakod Wangpaisit (THA)
26	Ghaith Ahmed (IRQ)
27	Ali Fadel (KUW)
28	Nguyễn Minh Quang (VIE)
29	Lam Pak Kio (MAC)
