= Cycling at the 2022 Asian Games – Women's cross-country =

Women's cross-country at the 2022 Asian Games
- Venue: Chun'an Jieshou Sports Centre
- Date: 25 September 2023
- Competitors: 15 from 10 nations

Medalists
gold medal	Li Hongfeng	China
silver medal	Ma Caixia	China
bronze medal	Faranak Partoazar	Iran

The women's cross country competition at the 2022 Asian Games was held on 25 September 2023 at the Chun'an Jieshou Sports Centre.

== Schedule ==
All times are China Standard Time (UTC+08:00)

Date	Time	Event
Monday, 25 September 2023	09:00	Final

== Results ==
Legend

- DNF — Did not finish

Rank	Athlete	Time
1st place, gold medalist(s)	Li Hongfeng (CHN)	1:30:59
2nd place, silver medalist(s)	Ma Caixia (CHN)	1:36:45
3rd place, bronze medalist(s)	Faranak Partoazar (IRI)	1:42:44
4	Alina Sarkulova (KAZ)	1:45:30
5	Tsai Ya-yu (TPE)	1:48:38
6	Dara Latifah (INA)	1:49:21
7	Shagne Yaoyao (PHI)	1:57:22
8	Sayu Bella Sukma Dewi (INA)	1:59:27
9	Kwan Tsz Kwan (HKG)	−1 lap
10	Yonthanan Phonkla (THA)	−1 lap
11	Supaksorn Nuntana (THA)	−1 lap
12	Tatyana Geneleva (KAZ)	−2 laps
—	Usha Khanal (NEP)	DNF
—	Akari Kobayashi (JPN)	DNF
DQ	Ariana Evangelista (PHI)	~~−2 laps~~

- Ariana Evangelista of the Philippines originally finished 13th, but was later disqualified after she tested positive for Erythropoietin.
