= Yuka Ueno =

Japanese fencer (born 2001)

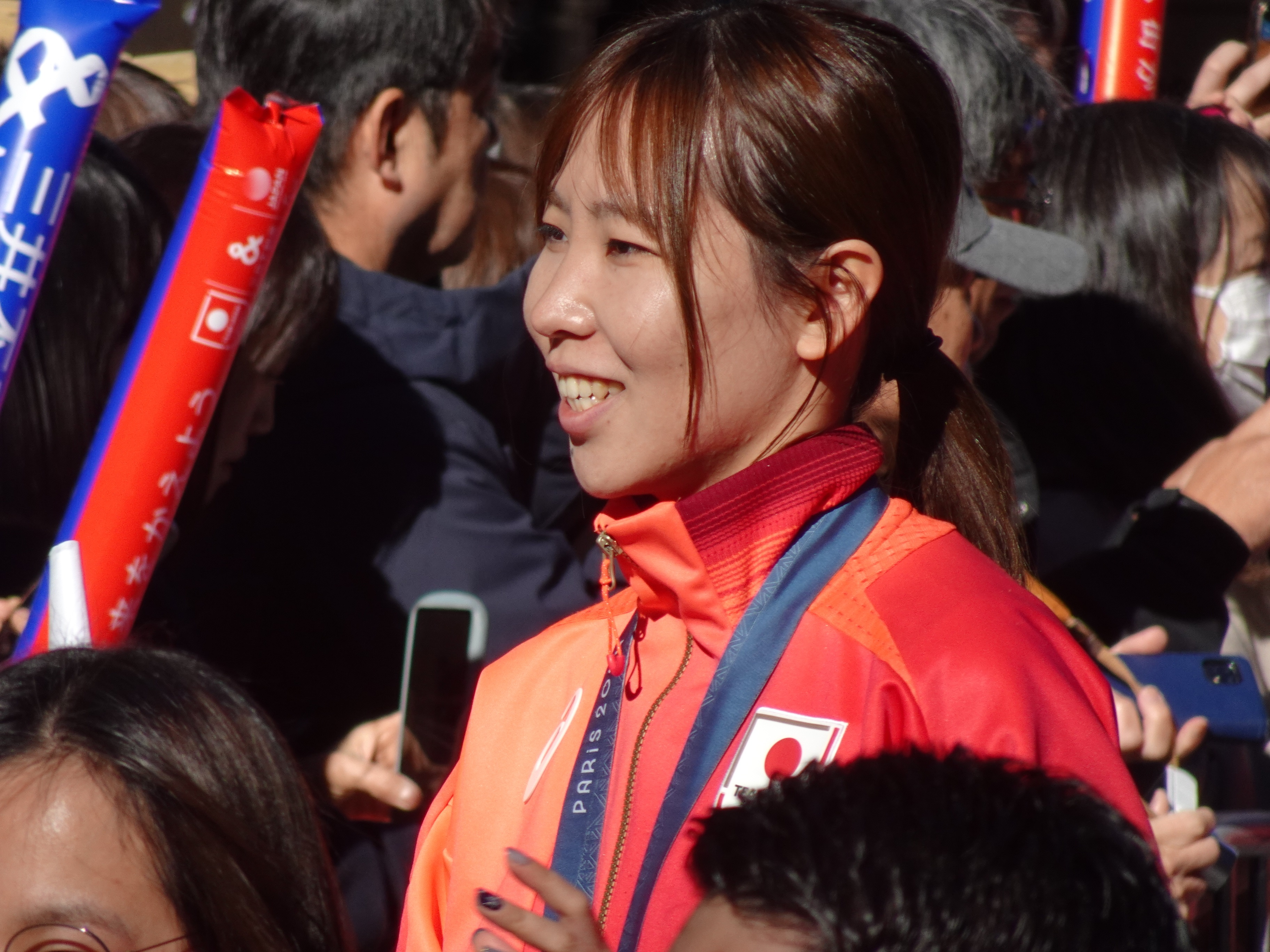
- Ueno at Paris 2024 Summer Olympians and Paralympians Japan National Team parade event on November 30, 2024

Personal information
- Born: 28 November 2001 (age 24) Hita, Oita, Japan
- Height: 1.59 m (5 ft 3 in)
- Weight: 52 kg (115 lb)

Fencing career
- Sport: Fencing
- Country: Japan
- Weapon: Foil
- Hand: Right-handed
- FIE ranking: current ranking
Medal record
Women's foil
Representing Japan
Olympic Games
Bronze medal – third place	2024 Paris	Team
World Championships
Bronze medal – third place	2023 Milan	Team
Bronze medal – third place	2026 Hong Kong	Individual
Bronze medal – third place	2026 Hong Kong	Team
Asian Games
Gold medal – first place	2026 Aichi–Nagoya	Individual
Gold medal – first place	2026 Aichi-Nagoya	Team
Silver medal – second place	2022 Hangzhou	Individual
Bronze medal – third place	2022 Hangzhou	Team
Asian Fencing Championships
Gold medal – first place	2019 Chiba	Team
Gold medal – first place	2024 Kuwait City	Team
Silver medal – second place	2019 Chiba	Individual
Bronze medal – third place	2022 Seoul	Individual
Bronze medal – third place	2024 Kuwait City	Individual
Summer Youth Olympics
Gold medal – first place	2018 Buenos Aires	Individual
Representing (International Olympic Committee) Mixed-NOCs
Youth Olympic Games
Silver medal – second place	2018 Buenos Aires	Mixed team

Yuka Ueno (上野 優佳, Ueno Yūka, born 28 November 2001) is a Japanese fencer. She won the silver medal in the women's foil event at the 2019 Asian Fencing Championships held in Chiba, Japan. She also won the gold medal in the women's team foil event.

== Career ==
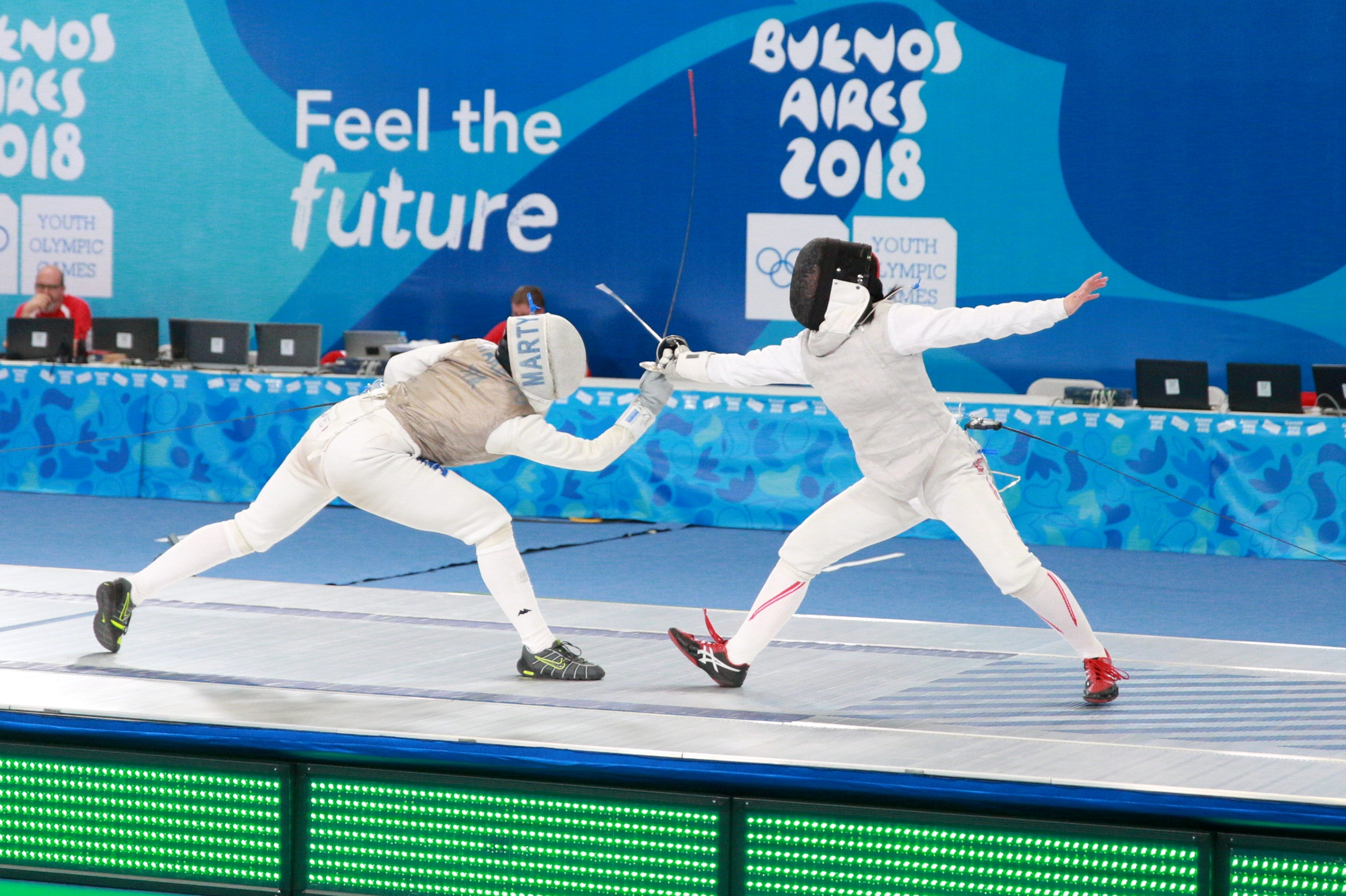
Ueno set the final hit against Martina Favretto at the final of the Youth Olympic Games

At the 2018 Summer Youth Olympics held in Buenos Aires, Argentina, she won the gold medal in the girls' foil event and also the silver medal in the mixed team event.

She won one of the bronze medals in the women's foil event at the 2022 Asian Fencing Championships held in Seoul, South Korea. She competed at the 2022 World Fencing Championships held in Cairo, Egypt.

In 2023, she competed in the women's foil event at the World Fencing Championships held in Milan, Italy. Ueno, Sera Azuma, Komaki Kikuchi and Karin Miyawaki won the bronze medal in the women's team foil event. Ueno and her teammates replicated the feat, winning another bronze medal in the women's team foil event at the 2024 Summer Olympics, marking Japan's first ever Olympic medal in the event.

== Medal record ==
=== Olympic Games ===
Year	Location	Event	Position
2024	Paris, France	Team Women's Foil	3rd
