= Hugo Eden Stiles =

British rugby player (born 1996)

Hugo Eden Stiles (born 17 August 1996) is a British professional rugby player who transitioned to rugby sevens.

== Early life and education ==
Stiles actively participated in the University of Bath Rugby Football Club. Stiles also earned a full blue at bath and then was also awarded a scholarship.

== Career ==
=== Rugby career ===
Stiles started his rugby journey with Valley RFC in Hong Kong, with whom he has played from January 2013 to the present, accumulating a tenure of 10 years and 10 months including his Asian U-19s Crown. He also became under – 20 captain.

In August 2014, Stiles joined the Hong Kong Sports Institute as a Rugby 7s Athlete, where he played for 9 years and 3 months.

Later, Stiles served as an Equity Analyst at Gavekal from August 2017 to May 2018 in Wan Chai, Hong Kong. He also took on the role of Academic Representative at the University of Bath from October 2016 to October 2017.

Stiles played the Rugby Sevens World Cups, winning the shield at the Hong Kong 7s and then went on to achieve back to back golds at the Asian Games.

== Awards ==
- Asian Games Gold Medalist (2018, 2022)
- Rugby World Cup Sevens (2018, 2022)
- Dual Career Athlete (2015)

== See also ==
- Hong Kong national under-20 rugby union team
- Rugby sevens at the 2018 Asian Games
- List of Asian Games medalists in rugby union
- Hong Kong national rugby sevens team
- Valley RFC
- 2023 World Rugby Sevens Challenger Series
- 2022 Rugby World Cup Sevens squads
- Rugby sevens at the 2022 Asian Games
