= Chen Yi-tung =

Taiwanese foil fencer

Personal information
- Native name: 陳弈通
- Nickname: Antonio
- Born: 27 June 2003 (age 23)
- Height: 175 cm (5 ft 9 in)
- Weight: 55 kg (121 lb)

Sport
- Country: Taiwan
- Sport: Fencing
Medal record
Men's foil (fencing)
Youth Olympic Games
Silver medal – second place	2018 Buenos Aires	Mixed team
Asian Championships
Bronze medal – third place	2022 Seoul	Men's team

Chen Yi-tung (Mandarin: 陳弈通; born 27 June 2003) is a Taiwanese foil fencer. He qualified for the 2024 Summer Olympics in Paris as the first male Taiwanese Olympic fencer in 36 years.

== Career ==
Chen began fencing in 3rd grade after trying out the sport at a Taiwanese summer camp. He made the national team at age 13.

In 2018, he won a silver medal in the mixed team event at the 2018 Summer Youth Olympics and placed 6th in boys' foil. At the 2018 Asian Games, Chen placed 6th in the men's team foil in Jakarta, Indonesia.

In 2022, Chen placed 8th in the Men's individual foil at the 2022 Asian Games in Hangzhou, China. At the 2022 Asian Fencing Championships, Chen placed 3rd in team foil, representing Chinese Taipei, or Taiwan, after defeating China 45-40 at Seoul, South Korea.

In 2024, Chen qualified for the 2024 Summer Olympics in Paris after defeating Samuel Elijah of Singapore 15-4 in Fujairah, UAE. He was congratulated by many Taiwanese embassies in various countries, including India, Canada, The United States, and France.

In 2025, Chen was a flagbearer alongside Yang Ya-yi at the 2025 Summer World University Games in Germany.

== Personal life ==
Chen has two younger brothers and two supportive parents who encourage his pursuit of becoming an elite fencer. He attended the Xue Xue Institute in Taipei for secondary school.

Chen attends the Savannah College of Art and Design (SCAD) in Savannah, Georgia, majoring in graphic design. He is "not only talented in fencing but also in art", leading to collaborations with an Italian fencing brand. He designs equipment and gear based on his artwork.
