= Cycling at the 2022 Asian Games – Women's madison =

Women's madison at the 2022 Asian Games
- Venue: Chun'an Jieshou Sports Centre Velodrome
- Dates: 28 September 2023
- Competitors: 14 from 7 nations

Medalists
gold medal	Tsuyaka Uchino; Maho Kakita	Japan
silver medal	Yang Qianyu; Lee Sze Wing	Hong Kong
bronze medal	Na Ah-reum; Lee Ju-mi	South Korea

The women's madison event at the 2022 Asian Games was held on 28 September 2023.

== Schedule ==
All times are China Standard Time (UTC+08:00)

Date	Time	Event
Thursday, 28 September 2023	15:45	Final

== Results ==
Legend

- DNF — Did not finish

Rank	Team	Sprint												Laps		Total	Finish order
Rank	Team	1	2	3	4	5	6	7	8	9	10	11	12	+	−	Total	Finish order
1st place, gold medalist(s)	Japan (JPN); Tsuyaka Uchino; Maho Kakita	3	5	5	2	3	5	5	3	2	2	5	10			50	1
2nd place, silver medalist(s)	Hong Kong (HKG); Yang Qianyu; Lee Sze Wing	5	1		5	5			5	5	5	3	6			40	2
3rd place, bronze medalist(s)	South Korea (KOR); Na Ah-reum; Lee Ju-mi	2	3	1	1	2	3	2	1	3	3	2	4			27	3
4	Uzbekistan (UZB); Nafosat Kozieva; Olga Zabelinskaya			2	3	1	2	1	2	1	1		2			15	4
5	China (CHN); Liu Jiali; Zhang Hongjie		2				1	3				1				7	5
6	Chinese Taipei (TPE); Zeng Ke-xin; Huang Ting-ying	1		3											20	–16	6
7	Kazakhstan (KAZ); Anzhela Solovyeva; Akpeiil Ossim														40	DNF	
