= Ma Se-geon =

South Korean fencer

Personal information
- Born: January 24, 1994 (age 32) Busan, South Korea

Fencing career
- Sport: Fencing
- Country: South Korea
- Weapon: Épée
- Hand: Left-handed
- FIE ranking: current ranking
Medal record
Representing South Korea
Olympic Games
| Bronze medal – third place | 2020 Tokyo | Team épée |
Asian Games
| Bronze medal – third place | 2022 Hangzhou | Team épée |

Ma Se-geon (Korean: 마세건; born January 24, 1994) is a South Korean left-handed épée fencer and 2021 team Olympic bronze medalist.

== Medal Record ==
=== Olympic Games ===
| Year | Location | Event | Position |
|---|---|---|---|
| 2021 | Tokyo, Japan | Team Men's Épée | 3rd |
