= Cycling at the 2022 Asian Games – Women's omnium =

Women's omnium at the 2022 Asian Games
- Venue: Chun'an Jieshou Sports Centre Velodrome
- Date: 29 September 2023
- Competitors: 12 from 12 nations

Medalists
gold medal	Yumi Kajihara	Japan
silver medal	Lee Sze Wing	Hong Kong
bronze medal	Liu Jiali	China

The women's omnium competition at the 2022 Asian Games was held on 29 September 2023 at the Chun'an Jieshou Sports Centre Velodrome.

== Schedule ==
All times are China Standard Time (UTC+08:00)

Date	Time	Event
Friday, 29 September 2023	14:00	Scratch race
Friday, 29 September 2023	15:00	Tempo race
Friday, 29 September 2023	18:27	Elimination race
Friday, 29 September 2023	20:12	Points race

== Results ==
Legend

- DNF — Did not finish

=== Scratch race ===
Rank	Athlete	Laps down	Points
1	Yumi Kajihara (JPN)		40
2	Lee Sze Wing (HKG)		38
3	Liu Jiali (CHN)		36
4	Lee Ju-mi (KOR)		34
5	Huang Ting-ying (TPE)		32
6	Akpeiil Ossim (KAZ)		30
7	Margarita Misyurina (UZB)		28
8	Ayustina Delia Priatna (INA)		26
9	Au Hoi Ian (MAC)		24
10	Fanny Cauchois-One (LAO)		22
11	Chaniporn Batriya (THA)		20
12	Zahra Hussain (UAE)		18

=== Tempo race ===
Rank	Athlete	Sprints won	Laps		Total	Finish order	Points
Rank	Athlete	Sprints won	+	−	Total	Finish order	Points
1	Lee Sze Wing (HKG)	15, 17, 18, 19, 20, 21, 22, 23, 24, 25, 26			11	1	40
2	Yumi Kajihara (JPN)	2, 6, 10, 11, 13, 16			6	7	38
3	Liu Jiali (CHN)	5, 12, 14			3	3	36
4	Margarita Misyurina (UZB)	4, 8			2	2	34
5	Huang Ting-ying (TPE)	3, 7			2	4	32
6	Ayustina Delia Priatna (INA)	9			1	6	30
7	Lee Ju-mi (KOR)				0	5	28
8	Chaniporn Batriya (THA)			20	–20	8	26
8	Akpeiil Ossim (KAZ)			20	–20	8	26
10	Fanny Cauchois-One (LAO)	1		40	DNF		–18
11	Au Hoi Ian (MAC)			40	DNF		–20
12	Zahra Hussain (UAE)			40	DNF		–22

=== Elimination race ===
Rank	Athlete	Points
1	Yumi Kajihara (JPN)	40
2	Liu Jiali (CHN)	38
3	Huang Ting-ying (TPE)	36
4	Lee Sze Wing (HKG)	34
5	Lee Ju-mi (KOR)	32
6	Margarita Misyurina (UZB)	30
7	Ayustina Delia Priatna (INA)	28
8	Au Hoi Ian (MAC)	26
9	Fanny Cauchois-One (LAO)	24
10	Akpeiil Ossim (KAZ)	22
11	Zahra Hussain (UAE)	20
12	Chaniporn Batriya (THA)	18

=== Points race ===
Rank	Athlete	Sprint								Laps		Total	Finish order
Rank	Athlete	1	2	3	4	5	6	7	8	+	−	Total	Finish order
1	Ayustina Delia Priatna (INA)	5								20		25	6
2	Margarita Misyurina (UZB)			5	5	5	5		2			22	4
3	Yumi Kajihara (JPN)			3	3	3		1	10			20	1
4	Lee Ju-mi (KOR)	3	5	1			2	5				16	7
5	Lee Sze Wing (HKG)		1	2	2	1	3		6			15	2
6	Liu Jiali (CHN)				1	2	1	3	4			11	3
7	Huang Ying-ting (TPE)							2				2	9
8	Akpeiil Ossim (KAZ)	2	3								20	–15	8
9	Chaniporn Batriya (THA)	1	2								20	–17	10
10	Au Hoi Ian (MAC)										20	–20	5
11	Fanny Cauchois-One (LAO)										20	–20	11
12	Zahra Hussain (UAE)										40	DNF	

=== Summary ===
Rank	Athlete	Scratch race	Tempo race	Elim. race	Points race	Total
1st place, gold medalist(s)	Yumi Kajihara (JPN)	40	38	40	20	138
2nd place, silver medalist(s)	Lee Sze Wing (HKG)	38	40	34	15	127
3rd place, bronze medalist(s)	Liu Jiali (CHN)	36	36	38	11	121
4	Margarita Misyurina (UZB)	28	34	30	22	114
5	Lee Ju-mi (KOR)	34	28	32	16	110
6	Ayustina Delia Priatna (INA)	26	30	28	25	109
7	Huang Ting-ying (TPE)	32	32	36	2	102
8	Akpeiil Ossim (KAZ)	30	26	22	–15	63
9	Chaniporn Batriya (THA)	20	26	18	–17	47
10	Au Hoi Ian (MAC)	24	–20	26	–20	10
11	Fanny Cauchois-One (LAO)	22	–18	24	–20	8
12	Zahra Hussain (UAE)	18	–22	20	–40	–24
