= Akira Komata =

Japanese fencer (born 1998)

Personal information
- Native name: 古俣聖
- Born: 31 January 1998 (age 28) Niigata, Japan

Sport
- Country: Japan
- Sport: Fencing
Medal record
Men's fencing
Representing Japan
Olympic Games
Silver medal – second place	2024 Paris	Team
World Championships
Gold medal – first place	2025 Tbilisi	Team
Asian Games
Gold medal – first place	2022 Guangzhou	Team
Silver medal – second place	2022 Guangzhou	Individual

Akira Komata (古俣聖, born 31 January 1998) is a Japanese fencer. He competed in the 2024 Summer Olympics.

== Medal record ==
=== Olympic Games ===
Year	Location	Event	Position
2024	Paris, France	Team Men's Épée	2nd
