= Chen Qingyuan =

Chinese fencer (born 1997)

Personal information
- Born: 15 February 1997 (age 29) Jinjiang, Fujian, China

Fencing career
- Sport: Fencing
- Country: China
- Hand: Right-handed
Medal record
Women's foil fencing
Representing China
Asian Games
Gold medal – first place	2022 Hangzhou	Team
Silver medal – second place	2018 Jakarta	Team
Asian Fencing Championships
Silver medal – second place	2022 Seoul	Individual
Silver medal – second place	2022 Seoul	Team
Silver medal – second place	2024 Kuwait City	Team
Bronze medal – third place	2019 Chiba	Individual
Bronze medal – third place	2018 Bangkok	Team
Bronze medal – third place	2019 Chiba	Team
Asian Youth Games
Gold medal – first place	2013 Nanjing	Individual
World University Games
Gold medal – first place	2021 Chengdu	Team
Bronze medal – third place	2021 Chengdu	Individual

Chen Qingyuan (simplified Chinese: 陈情缘; traditional Chinese: 陳情緣; pinyin: Chén Qíngyuán; born 15 February 1997) is a Chinese right-handed foil fencer. She won the silver medal in both the women's individual and team foil events at the 2022 Asian Fencing Championships held in Seoul, South Korea.

In 2018, she won the silver medal in the women's team foil event at the Asian Games held in Jakarta, Indonesia.

She won one of the bronze medals in the women's foil event at the 2019 Asian Fencing Championships held in Chiba, Japan. She also won the bronze medal in the women's team foil event. She also competed at the World Fencing Championships in 2018, 2019, 2022 and 2023. On the 11th of January 2024 she won the World Cup in Paris in individuals.
