= Lee Sze Wing =

Hong Kong cyclist (born 2001)

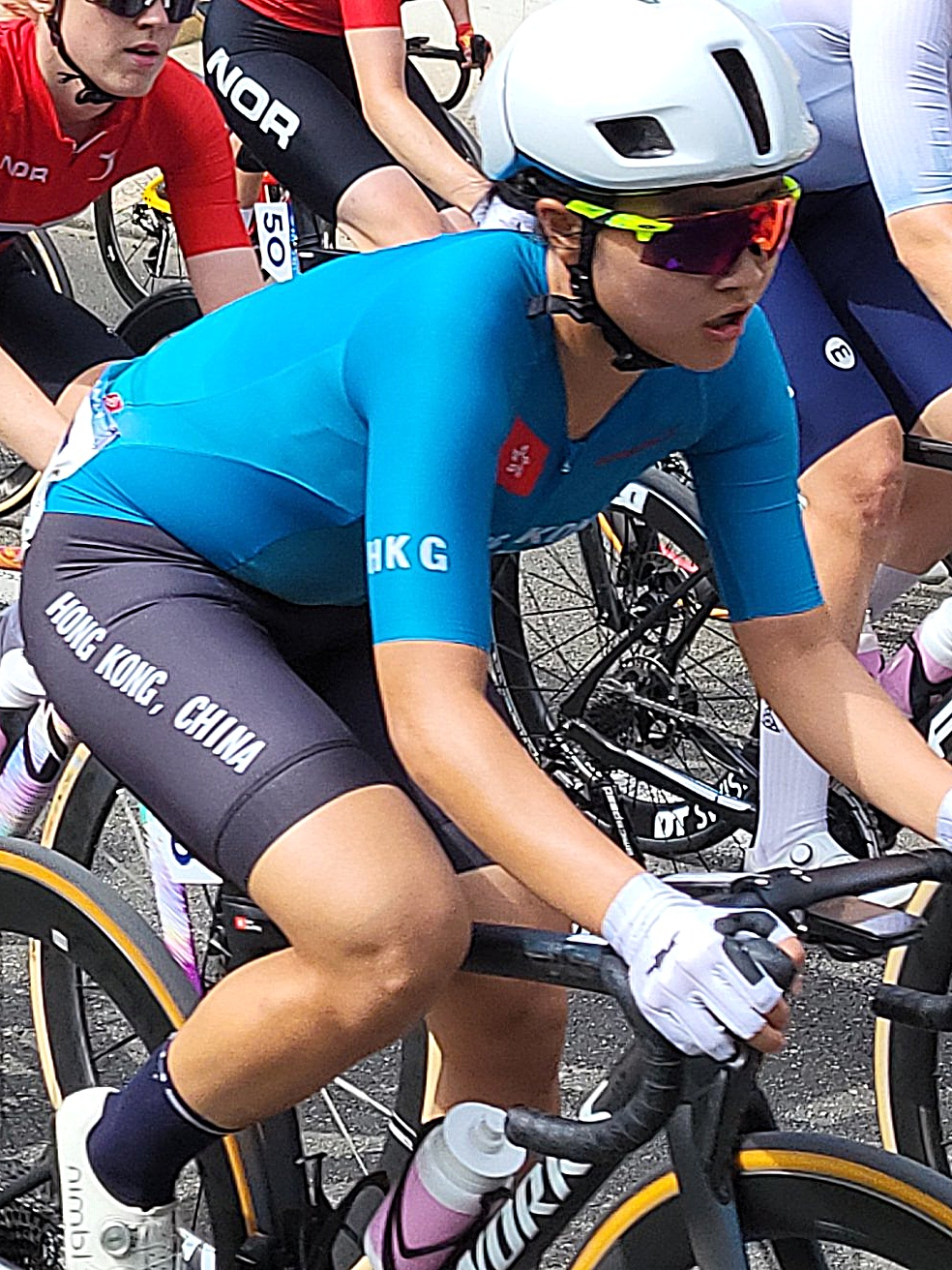
- Lee at the 2024 Summer Olympics

Personal information
- Born: 5 May 2001 (age 25) Hong Kong
- Height: 1.63 m (5 ft 4 in)

Cycling career
- Sport: Cycling
- Role: Rider

Professional team
- 2024–: HKSI Pro Cycling Team
Medal record
Representing Hong Kong
Women's track cycling
Event	1st	2nd	3rd
Asian Games	0	3	2
Asian Championships	3	7	7
Total	3	10	9
Asian Games
Silver medal – second place	2022 Hangzhou	Omnium
Silver medal – second place	2022 Hangzhou	Madison
Silver medal – second place	2026 Aichi–Nagoya	Madison
Bronze medal – third place	2022 Hangzhou	Team pursuit
Bronze medal – third place	2026 Aichi–Nagoya	Omnium
Asian Championships
Gold medal – first place	2025 Nilai	Scratch
Gold medal – first place	2026 Tagaytay	Scratch
Gold medal – first place	2026 Tagaytay	Elimination
Silver medal – second place	2023 Nilai	Omnium
Silver medal – second place	2024 New Delhi	Scratch
Silver medal – second place	2024 New Delhi	Elimination
Silver medal – second place	2025 Nilai	Elimination
Silver medal – second place	2025 Nilai	Madison
Silver medal – second place	2025 Nilai	Omnium
Silver medal – second place	2026 Tagaytay	Omnium
Bronze medal – third place	2020 Jincheon	Omnium
Bronze medal – third place	2023 Nilai	Scratch
Bronze medal – third place	2024 New Delhi	Omnium
Bronze medal – third place	2024 New Delhi	Madison
Bronze medal – third place	2025 Nilai	Team pursuit
Bronze medal – third place	2026 Tagaytay	Madison
Bronze medal – third place	2026 Tagaytay	Team pursuit
Women's road bicycle racing
Asian Championships
Bronze medal – third place	2024 Almaty	Mixed team relay
Bronze medal – third place	2025 Phitsanulok	Road race
Bronze medal – third place	2025 Phitsanulok	Mixed team relay

Ceci Lee Sze Wing (born 5 May 2001) is a Hong Kong professional racing cyclist currently competing for HKSI Pro Cycling Team. She rode in the women's omnium event at the 2020 UCI Track Cycling World Championships in Berlin, Germany.

== Career ==
=== Junior years (2019–2021) ===
Lee initially competed in triathlon. Because cycling was her weakest discipline there, she did additional cycling training and eventually turned to this sport entirely. As a junior, she won several titles in road races and individual time trials at Hong Kong team and Asian championships in 2018 and 2019. Also as a junior, she won the Hong Kong scratch race championship on the track ahead of Lee Wai Sze. She won a bronze medal at the 2020 Asian Championships, which were brought forward to October 2019.

=== Senior years (2021–present) ===
In the following years, competition was very limited as a result of the COVID-19 pandemic. In September 2021, Lee won the road race at the Chinese National Games. At that time, she was studying health education at the Education University of Hong Kong. At the end of 2022, she won the Chinese Omnium Championships. 2023 was her most successful year to date: she became Hong Kong road race champion and won several medals at Asian Championships and Asian Games. At the 2023 Tour of Chongming Island, she rode with the Hong Kong national team for the first time in the UCI Women's WorldTour. In 2024, she was again Hong Kong road race champion. At the 2024 Olympic Games, she was nominated for both the road race and the Omnium; in the road race she came 66th and in the Omnium she came 20th.

At the 2025 Asian Championships, Lee won her first title as Asian Champion in scratch.

She has represented Hong Kong at several road and track world championships. In an interview, she complained that she was unable to spend much time in her hometown because she had to train in other parts of China because of the traffic there.

Lee competed in the women's individual road race and track cycling events at the 2024 Paris Olympics. She completed the 158 km road race in 4 hours 10 minutes 47 seconds, finishing 64th, becoming the first female Hong Kong athlete to do so. She then competed in the track cycling event, performing well in all four events and finishing 20th overall. She is the first female Hong Kong athlete to compete in both the road and track cycling events at the Olympics.

On September 26, 2021, she won the first National Games women's road race championship in Hong Kong's history, which was also the second gold medal for the Hong Kong team at the 2021 National Games of China. After the game, Lee Sze Wing declared the following: "I am very happy... Losing in the all-around competition was a bit of a blow, but winning the gold medal made me very happy! I never thought I would achieve such a result. ... Without the efforts of the team, today's competition would not have been successful."

== Major results ==
2018
National Junior Road Championships

1st Road race
2nd Time trial

Asian Championships

3rd Junior Time trial
8th Junior Road race

2019
National Junior Road Championships

1st Road race
1st Time trial

1st Asian Championships, Junior Road race
2023
1st Road race, National Road Championships
