= Sera Azuma =

Japanese fencer (born 1999)

Personal information
- Nationality: Japanese
- Born: 20 August 1999 (age 27) Wakayama, Japan

Fencing career
- Sport: Fencing
- Weapon: Foil
- Hand: Right-handed
- FIE ranking: current ranking
Medal record
Women's foil
Representing Japan
Olympic Games
Bronze medal – third place	2024 Paris	Team
World Championships
Bronze medal – third place	2023 Milan	Team
Bronze medal – third place	2026 Hong Kong	Team
Asian Games
Gold medal – first place	2018 Jakarta	Team
Gold medal – first place	2026 Aichi-Nagoya	Team
Bronze medal – third place	2018 Jakarta	Individual
Bronze medal – third place	2022 Hangzhou	Team
Asian Fencing Championships
Gold medal – first place	2019 Chiba	Team
Gold medal – first place	2024 Kuwait City	Team
Silver medal – second place	2017 Hong Kong	Team
Silver medal – second place	2018 Bangkok	Team
Bronze medal – third place	2019 Chiba	Individual
Bronze medal – third place	2022 Seoul	Individual

Sera Azuma (東晟良, born 20 August 1999) is a Japanese fencer. She competed in the women's individual foil event at the 2018 Asian Games, winning the bronze medal. She won one of the bronze medals in the women's foil event at the 2019 Asian Fencing Championships held in Chiba, Japan. At the 2024 Summer Olympics, she earned the bronze medal in the women's team foil event, which was Japan's first-ever Olympic medal in the event.

== Medal record ==
=== Olympic Games ===
Year	Location	Event	Position
2024	Paris, France	Team Women's Foil	3rd
