= Hangzhou Dianzi University =

Provincial public university in Hangzhou, Zhejiang, China

- 杭州电子科技大学
- Former names: 杭州电子工业学院; Hangzhou Institute of Electrical Engineering
- Motto: Unity, diligence, truth-seeking, and innovation
- Type: Public
- Established: 1956
- President: Chen Jiming
- Faculty: approx 2,700
- Students: approx 28,000
- Location: Hangzhou, Zhejiang, China
- Campus: 5 campuses
- Website: en.hdu.edu.cn

Hangzhou Dianzi University
- Simplified Chinese: 杭州电子科技大学
- Traditional Chinese: 杭州電子科技大學
Transcriptions
Standard Mandarin
- Hanyu Pinyin: Hángzhōu Diànzǐ Kējì Dàxué

Hangzhou Dianzi University (HDU; Chinese: 杭州电子科技大学; pinyin: Hángzhōu diànzǐ kējì dàxué; lit. 'Hangzhou Electronic Science and Technology University') is a provincial public university in Hangzhou, Zhejiang, China. It is affiliated with the Province of Zhejiang, and co-funded by the Zhejiang Provincial People's Government and SASTIND.

The earliest predecessor of the school was founded in 1956 and was originally named Hangzhou Aviation Industry Finance and Economics School (杭州航空工业财经学校). Later, it was renamed Hangzhou Aviation Industry School (杭州航空工业学校), Zhejiang Electrical Machine Vocational School (浙江电机专科学校), Zhejiang Mechanical Industry School (浙江机械工业学校), Hangzhou Radio Industry Management School (杭州无线电工业管理学校), and Hangzhou Radio Industry School (杭州无线电工业学校). In 1980, the school was renamed Hangzhou Electronic Industry College (杭州电子工业学院). In 2003, the then Hangzhou Publishing School (杭州出版学校) was merged into the school. In 2004, the school was granted university status and was renamed Hangzhou Electronic Science and Technology University (杭州电子科技大学).

== History ==
There are three phases in the development of Hangzhou Dianzi University.

Zhejiang Electrical College

Hangzhou Dianzi University, initially known as Aviation Industry Finance School, was established in March 1956, and it was affiliated with the Second Ministry of Machine Building.

In June 1958, the school changed its name to Hangzhou Aviation Industry School, under the administration of the First Ministry of Machine Building.

In December 1958, the school was assigned to Zhejiang province, and it merged with the Motor Division of Zhejiang Machinery College (now Zhejiang Institute of Mechanical and Electrical Engineering) into Zhejiang Electrical College, under the administration Zhejiang Provincial Machinery Agency.

In April 1961, the school changed its name to Zhejiang Machinery Industry School, under the administration of Zhejiang Provincial Machinery Department.

In November 1962, the Central government reclaimed the administration of the school, under the administration of the Third Ministry of Machine Building.

In March 1963, the school is assigned to under the administration of the Fourth Ministry of Machine Building.

In January 1965, the school changed its name to Hangzhou Wireless Industry Management School, under the administration of the Fourth Ministry of Machine Building.

In February 1970, the school was changed to be a factory, with its name being Xuejun Machine Factory, under the administration of the Fourth Ministry of Machine Building.

In May 1973, approved by the central government, the school recovered with the name of Hangzhou Wireless Industry School, under the administration of the Fourth Ministry of Machine Building.

Hangzhou Institute of Electronic Industry

On May 8, 1980, the State Council formally approved the establishment of Hangzhou Institute of Electronics Industry, and it is managed under the guideline of "Under the dual administration of the Fourth Ministry of Machine Building and Zhejiang Province, with Ministry administration being primary and provincial administration being supplementary."

In 1981, the institute began to recruit master's students.

In 1990, the institute was entitled to a grant master's degrees.

In 1996, the institute was approved to entitled to grant doctor's degree of "circuit and system" doctoral jointly with the former Hangzhou University.

In 1997, the Ministry of the Electronics Industry (China) and Zhejiang Province signed an agreement to co-build Hangzhou Institute of Electronic Industry.

May 2000, the school management system witnessed major changes. It became under the "provincial and ministerial co-administration, province-based" management system and, it was listed as a key construction teaching research university in Zhejiang Province.

In 2003, the former Hangzhou Publishing School was incorporated into the school. Approved by the Ministry of Education, the school was entitled to jointly grant doctoral degrees.

Hangzhou Dianzi University

In May 2004, Hangzhou Institute of Electronic Industry changed its name to Hangzhou Dianzi University.

In 2007, the Commission for Science, Technology and Industry for National Defense (the predecessor of the State Administration for Science, Technology and Industry for National Defense) and Zhejiang Provincial Government signed an agreement for the first time to co-build Hangzhou Dianzi University.

In 2009, the university became doctoral degree conferring institutions.

In March 2011, Zhejiang Provincial Government signed an agreement with the State Administration for Science, Technology and Industry for National Defense to continue building Hangzhou Dianzi University during the "12th Five-Year Plan" period.

In 2015, it was listed in the first group of the 5 universities with prior development by Zhengjiang Provincial Government.

In 2016, the State Administration for Science, Technology and Industry for National Defense and Zhejiang Provincial People's Government continued to co-build Hangzhou Dianzi University during the "13th Five-Year Plan" period.

In August 2017, the university was listed as one of the universities being able to recommend graduate students for admission to graduate schools without entrance exams. It was also chosen to be listed in the Plan 111.

== Academic ==
HDU is administered directly by the Ministry of Industry and Information Technology and the provincial government. It emphasizes the disciplines of engineering, economics, sciences, and arts. It has more than 40 research institutions and enrolls 28,000 students with 2,200 faculty and staff. The university has completed a host of high-tech research projects and province- or ministry-sponsored research projects, many of which were awarded the National First/Second Prize for Scientific and Technology Progress, the National Invention Prize, and the National Pedagogical Achievement Prize.

HDU is among the top universities in China in the postgraduate program admission rate and the successful employment rate for its graduates.

In 2013, HDU started to cooperate with The Association of Chartered Certified Accountants (ACCA), and organized its own ACCA-based-course program. The program enrolled large quantities of talented students, and helped many of them enter Big Four accounting firms successfully, making it elite program in the university.

The university is known as "The Cradle of Entrepreneurs" in China and has an extensive entrepreneurial network worldwide.

== Campuses ==
=== Xiasha ===
Biggest and oldest campus

=== East Xiasha ===
For Software Engineering School

=== Wenyi ===
This is the oldest and original campus of the University

=== Dongyue ===
For Hangzhou Dianzi University Information Engineering School

=== Qingshanhu ===
For Hangzhou Dianzi University Information Engineering School

== Notable alumni, faculty and students ==
- Yi Huiman, chairman of China Securities Regulatory Commission, former chairman and executive director of ICBC
- Jack Ma, founder and chairman of Alibaba Group
- Zheng Jun, rock singer-songwriter
- Zhang Ruonan, actress and model
- Chang Huasen, Actor and singer
