= Esports at the 2022 Asian Games – EA Sports FC Online =

EA Sports FC Online at the 2022 Asian Games
- Venue: Hangzhou Esports Center
- Date: 24–27 September 2023
- Competitors: 36 from 21 nations

Medalists
gold medal	Teedech Songsaisakul	Thailand
silver medal	Phatanasak Varanan	Thailand
bronze medal	Kwak Jun-hyouk	South Korea

The EA Sports FC Online event at the 2022 Asian Games took place from 24 to 27 September 2023 in Hangzhou, China.

A qualification tournament called AESF Road to Asian Games 2022 was played in Seoul, South Korea from 2 to 8 August 2023. The results of this tournament were used to determine the seedings for the Games. Ahmed Mujahid, Kakhramon Solikhboev, Charanjot Singh, Teedech Songsaisakul and Kwak Jun-hyouk won their respective groups to become the top five seeds.

== Schedule ==
All times are China Standard Time (UTC+08:00)

Date	Time	Event
Sunday, 24 September 2023	09:00	Qualification
Sunday, 24 September 2023	10:30	Round of 32
Sunday, 24 September 2023	14:00	Round 1
Sunday, 24 September 2023	15:30	Round 2
Sunday, 24 September 2023	19:00	Round 3
Sunday, 24 September 2023	20:30	Round 4
Monday, 25 September 2023	09:00	Round 5
Monday, 25 September 2023	10:30	Round 6
Monday, 25 September 2023	19:00	Round 7
Monday, 25 September 2023	20:30	Winners final
Wednesday, 27 September 2023	19:00	Losers final
Wednesday, 27 September 2023	20:30	Final

== Results ==
Legend

- WD — Won by withdrawal

=== Qualification ===
Qualification
Sameer Gurung (NEP)	1
Tong Hang Sam (MAC)	2
Sharifi Behruzi (TJK)
Hồ Gia Huy (VIE)	WD
Ahmad Al-Suwaidi (UAE)	0
Trương Đức Hiếu (VIE)	2
Mohammad Ega Rahmaditya (INA)	2
Ali Raaidh Hassan (MDV)	0

=== Winners bracket ===
==== Top half ====
Round of 32
Teedech Songsaisakul (THA)	2
Tong Hang Sam (MAC)	0
Ali Al-Hammadi (UAE)	2
Ahmed Al-Meghessib (QAT)	0
Abdelhakim Al-Darawsheh (JOR)	0
Park Ki-young (KOR)	2
Fan Cheuk Wa (HKG)	2
Mohamed Zameel Zihny (MDV)	0
Charanjot Singh (IND)	0
Liu Jiacheng (CHN)	2
Jorrel Aristorenas (PHI)	0
Rashed Al-Rowaihi (BRN)	2
Mosaad Al-Dossary (KSA)	0
Olzhas Yessentayev (KAZ)	2
Hồ Gia Huy (VIE)	2
Kakhramon Solikhboev (UZB)	0

Round 1
Teedech Songsaisakul (THA)	2
Ali Al-Hammadi (UAE)	0
Park Ki-young (KOR)	0
Fan Cheuk Wa (HKG)	2
Liu Jiacheng (CHN)	2
Rashed Al-Rowaihi (BRN)	0
Olzhas Yessentayev (KAZ)	0
Hồ Gia Huy (VIE)	2

Round 2
Teedech Songsaisakul (THA)	2
Fan Cheuk Wa (HKG)	0
Liu Jiacheng (CHN)	0
Hồ Gia Huy (VIE)	2

Round 3
Teedech Songsaisakul (THA)	2
Hồ Gia Huy (VIE)	0

==== Bottom half ====
Round of 32
Ahmed Mujahid (KSA)	0
Trương Đức Hiếu (VIE)	2
Nuno Martins Dias (MAC)	0
Phatanasak Varanan (THA)	2
Manuchekhr Benazirzoda (TJK)	0
Nurbakyt Mirgali (KAZ)	2
Jassim Al-Eid (QAT)	2
Ulmasbek Fayziev (UZB)	0
Meshari Al-Dhafiri (KUW)	2
Abdelrahman Kiswani (PLE)	1
Karman Singh Tikka (IND)	1
Abdulaziz Faqeehi (BRN)	2
Yau Man Lung (HKG)	0
Li Sijun (CHN)	2
Mohammad Ega Rahmaditya (INA)	0
Kwak Jun-hyouk (KOR)	2

Round 1
Trương Đức Hiếu (VIE)	0
Phatanasak Varanan (THA)	2
Nurbakyt Mirgali (KAZ)	2
Jassim Al-Eid (QAT)	0
Meshari Al-Dhafiri (KUW)	1
Abdulaziz Faqeehi (BRN)	2
Li Sijun (CHN)	0
Kwak Jun-hyouk (KOR)	2

Round 2
Phatanasak Varanan (THA)	2
Nurbakyt Mirgali (KAZ)	0
Abdulaziz Faqeehi (BRN)	1
Kwak Jun-hyouk (KOR)	2

Round 3
Phatanasak Varanan (THA)	0
Kwak Jun-hyouk (KOR)	2

=== Losers bracket ===
Round 1
Tong Hang Sam (MAC)	0
Ahmed Al-Meghessib (QAT)	2
Abdelhakim Al-Darawsheh (JOR)	0
Mohamed Zameel Zihny (MDV)	2
Charanjot Singh (IND)	2
Jorrel Aristorenas (PHI)	0
Mosaad Al-Dossary (KSA)	0
Kakhramon Solikhboev (UZB)	2
Ahmed Mujahid (KSA)	0
Nuno Martins Dias (MAC)	2
Manuchekhr Benazirzoda (TJK)	2
Ulmasbek Fayziev (UZB)	0
Abdelrahman Kiswani (PLE)	1
Karman Singh Tikka (IND)	2
Yau Man Lung (HKG)	0
Mohammad Ega Rahmaditya (INA)	2

Round 2
Ali Al-Hammadi (UAE)	1
Ahmed Al-Meghessib (QAT)	2
Park Ki-young (KOR)	2
Mohamed Zameel Zihny (MDV)	0
Rashed Al-Rowaihi (BRN)	1
Charanjot Singh (IND)	2
Olzhas Yessentayev (KAZ)	2
Kakhramon Solikhboev (UZB)	1
Trương Đức Hiếu (VIE)	2
Nuno Martins Dias (MAC)	1
Jassim Al-Eid (QAT)	2
Manuchekhr Benazirzoda (TJK)	1
Meshari Al-Dhafiri (KUW)	2
Karman Singh Tikka (IND)	1
Li Sijun (CHN)	0
Mohammad Ega Rahmaditya (INA)	2

Round 3
Ahmed Al-Meghessib (QAT)	0
Park Ki-young (KOR)	2
Charanjot Singh (IND)	2
Olzhas Yessentayev (KAZ)	0
Trương Đức Hiếu (VIE)	2
Jassim Al-Eid (QAT)	0
Meshari Al-Dhafiri (KUW)	0
Mohammad Ega Rahmaditya (INA)	2

Round 4
Fan Cheuk Wa (HKG)	0
Park Ki-young (KOR)	2
Liu Jiacheng (CHN)	2
Charanjot Singh (IND)	0
Nurbakyt Mirgali (KAZ)	2
Trương Đức Hiếu (VIE)	1
Abdulaziz Faqeehi (BRN)	0
Mohammad Ega Rahmaditya (INA)	2

Round 5
Park Ki-young (KOR)	2
Liu Jiacheng (CHN)	1
Nurbakyt Mirgali (KAZ)	0
Mohammad Ega Rahmaditya (INA)	2

Round 6
Hồ Gia Huy (VIE)	0
Park Ki-young (KOR)	2
Phatanasak Varanan (THA)	2
Mohammad Ega Rahmaditya (INA)	0

Round 7
Park Ki-young (KOR)	0
Phatanasak Varanan (THA)	2

=== Finals ===
Winners final
Teedech Songsaisakul (THA)	2
Kwak Jun-hyouk (KOR)	1

Losers final
Kwak Jun-hyouk (KOR)	1
Phatanasak Varanan (THA)	2

Final
Teedech Songsaisakul (THA)	2
Phatanasak Varanan (THA)	0
