= Uzbekistan at the 2022 Asian Games =

- IOC code: UZB
- NOC: National Olympic Committee of the Republic of Uzbekistan

in Hangzhou, China 23 September 2023 – 8 October 2023
- Competitors: 394
- Medals Ranked 5th: Gold 22 Silver 18 Bronze 31 Total 71

Asian Games appearances (overview)
- 1994; 1998; 2002; 2006; 2010; 2014; 2018; 2022; 2026

Uzbekistan competed at the 2022 Asian Games. The games were held in Zhejiang province and the meaning venue was Hangzhou.

Earlier the event was scheduled to held in September 2022 but due to COVID-19 pandemic cases rising in China the event was postponed and rescheduled to September–October 2023.

== Medalists ==
The following Uzbekistan competitors won medals at the Games.

Medal	Name	Sport	Event	Date
Gold	Diyora Keldiyorova	Judo	Women's −52 kg	24 Sep
Gold	Anna Prakaten	Rowing	Women's single sculls	25 Sep
Gold	Shehroz Hakimov; Dilshodjon Khudoyberdiev; Davrjon Davronov; Alisher Turdiev	Rowing	Men's four	25 Sep
Gold	Murodjon Yuldoshev	Judo	Men's −73 kg	25 Sep
Gold	Muzaffarbek Turoboyev	Judo	Men's −100 kg	26 Sep
Gold	Ulugbek Rashitov	Taekwondo	Men's 68 kg	27 Sep
Gold	Zaynab Dayibekova; Paola Pliego; Gulistan Perdebaeva; Fernanda Herrera	Fencing	Women's team sabre	29 Sep
Gold	Artyom Shturbabin	Kurash	Men's 66 kg	30 Sep
Gold	Khilola Ortikboeva	Kurash	Women's 52 kg	30 Sep
Gold	Mukhsin Khisomiddinov	Kurash	Men's +90 kg	30 Sep
Gold	Umid Esanov	Kurash	Men's −81 kg	1 Oct
Gold	Olga Zabelinskaya	Cycling	Women's individual	3 Oct
Gold	Shokhmurod Kholmurodov; Nurislom Tukhtasin ugli	Canoeing	Men's C-2 1000 metres	3 Oct
Gold	Safina Sadullaeva	Athletics	Women's high jump	3 Oct
Gold	Jalgasbay Berdimuratov	Wrestling	Men's Greco-Roman 87 kg	4 Oct
Gold	Sharifa Davronova	Athletics	Women's triple jump	4 Oct
Gold	Hasanboy Dusmatov	Boxing	Men's 51 kg	5 Oct
Gold	Abdumalik Khalokov	Boxing	Men's 57 kg	5 Oct
Gold	Bakhodir Jalolov	Boxing	Men's +92 kg	5 Oct
Gold	Takhmina Ikromova; Evelina Atalyants; Vilana Savadyan	Gymnastics	Women's rhythmic team	6 Oct
Gold	Sevinch Rakhimova	Karate	Women's kumite 55 kg	7 Oct
Gold	Takhmina Ikromova	Gymnastics	Women's rhythmic individual all-around	7 Oct
Silver	Luizakhon Islomova; Malika Tagmatova	Rowing	Women's lightweight double sculls	24 Sep
Silver	Shakhboz Kholmurzaev; Mekhrojbek Mamatkulov	Rowing	Men's double sculls	24 Sep
Silver	Shekhroz Hakimov; Dilshodjon Khudoyberdiev	Rowing	Men's pair	24 Sep
Silver	Shakhzod Nurmatov; Shakhboz Kholmurzaev; Mekhrojbek Mamatkulov; Sobirjon Safaroliev	Rowing	Men's quadruple sculls	25 Sep
Silver	Javokhir Sokhibov; Mukhtasar Tokhirova	Shooting	Mixed 10 metre air rifle team	26 Sep
Silver	Davlat Bobonov	Judo	Men's 90 kg	26 Sep
Silver	Feruza Sadikova	Taekwondo	Women's 67 kg	27 Sep
Silver	Sardor Nurillaev; Murodjon Yuldoshev; Davlat Bobonov; Muso Sobirov; Shokhrukhkhon Bakhtiyorov; Alisher Yusupov; Shukurjon Aminova; Diyora Keldiyorova; Sevinch Isokova; Gulnoza Matniyazova; Rinata Ilmatova; Iriskhon Kurbanbaeva	Judo	Mixed team	27 Sep
Silver	Nodirbek Abdusattorov	Chess	Men's individual	27 Sep
Silver	Umida Omonova	Chess	Women's individual	27 Sep
Silver	Sitora Elmurodova	Kurash	Women's 52 kg	30 Sep
Silver	Ekaterina Voronina	Athletics	Women's heptathlon	1 Oct
Silver	Vladlen Denisov	Canoeing	Men's C-1 1000 metres	2 Oct
Silver	Shakhriyor Makhkamov	Canoeing	Men's K-1 1000 metres	2 Oct
Silver	Svetlana Radzivil	Athletics	Women's high jump	3 Oct
Silver	Mukhammadkodir Toshtemirov	Weightlifting	Men's 81 kg	4 Oct
Silver	Anvar Klevleev	Canoeing	Men's slalom C-1	6 Oct
Silver	Akbar Djuraev	Weightlifting	Men's 109 kg	6 Oct
Bronze	Shahkhzod Nurmatov; Sobirjon Safaroliev	Rowing	Men's lightweight double sculls	24 Sep
Bronze	Khalimajon Kurbonova	Judo	Women's −48 kg	24 Sep
Bronze	Dilnaz Murtazayeva	Fencing	Women's individual épée	24 Sep
Bronze	Madinabonu Mannopova	Taekwondo	Women's 49 kg	25 Sep
Bronze	Jasurbek Jaysunov; Shukhrat Salaev; Svetlana Osipova; Ozoda Sobirjonova	Taekwondo	Mixed team	25 Sep
Bronze	Gulnoza Matniyazova	Judo	Women's −70 kg	25 Sep
Bronze	Charos Kayumova	Taekwondo	Women's 53 kg	26 Sep
Bronze	Iriskhon Kurbanbaeva	Judo	Women's −78 kg	26 Sep
Bronze	Alisher Yusupov	Judo	Men's +100 kg	26 Sep
Bronze	Darya Latisheva	Wushu	Women's nanquan	26 Sep
Bronze	Zaynab Dayibekova	Fencing	Women's individual sabre	26 Sep
Bronze	Javokhir Sindarov	Chess	Men's individual	27 Sep
Bronze	Svetlana Osipova	Taekwondo	Women's 67 kg	28 Sep
Bronze	Vladimir Svechnikov	Shooting	Men's 10 metre air pistol	28 Sep
Bronze	Khumoyun Sultanov	Tennis	Men's singles	28 Sep
Bronze	Sukhrob Khodjaev	Athletics	Men's hammer throw	30 Sep
Bronze	Malikakhon Kakhorova	Kurash	Women's 70 kg	1 Oct
Bronze	Ekaterina Shubina; Arina Tanatmisheva	Canoeing	Women's K-2 500 metres	2 Oct
Bronze	Nigina Uktamova	Boxing	Women's 54 kg	3 Oct
Bronze	Shakhrizoda Mavlonova; Arina Tanatmisheva; Ekaterina Shubina; Yuliya Borzova	Canoeing	Women's K-4 500 metres	3 Oct
Bronze	Shokhsanam Sherzodova; Nilufar Zokirova	Canoeing	Women's C-2 200 metres	3 Oct
Bronze	Turabek Khabibullaev	Boxing	Men's 80 kg	4 Oct
Bronze	Rustam Assakalov	Wrestling	Men's Greco-Roman 97 kg	5 Oct
Bronze	Aktenge Keunimjaeva	Wrestling	Women's freestyle 50 kg	5 Oct
Bronze	Laylokhon Sobirova	Wrestling	Women's freestyle 57 kg	5 Oct
Bronze	Ruslan Nurudinov	Weightlifting	Men's 109 kg	6 Oct
Bronze	Bekzod Abdurakhmonov	Wrestling	Men's freestyle 74 kg	7 Oct
Bronze	Javrail Shapiev	Wrestling	Men's freestyle 86 kg	7 Oct
Bronze	Uzbekistan	Football	Men's tournament	7 Oct
Bronze	Nodirbek Abdusattorov; Nodirbek Yakubboev; Jahongir Vakhidov; Shamsiddin Vokhidov; Javokhir Sindarov	Chess	Men's team standard	7 Oct
Bronze	Rustam Djangabaev	Weightlifting	Men's +109 kg	7 Oct

Medals by sport
Sport	1st place, gold medalist(s)	2nd place, silver medalist(s)	3rd place, bronze medalist(s)	Total
Athletics	2	2	1	5
Boxing	3	0	2	5
Canoeing	1	3	3	7
Cycling	1	0	0	1
Chess	0	2	2	4
Fencing	1	0	2	3
Football	0	0	1	1
Gymnastics	2	0	0	2
Judo	3	2	4	9
Karate	1	0	0	1
Kurash	4	1	1	6
Rowing	2	4	1	7
Taekwondo	1	1	4	6
Tennis	0	0	1	1
Shooting	0	1	1	2
Weightlifting	0	2	2	4
Wrestling	1	0	5	6
Wushu	0	0	1	1

Medals by day
Day	Date	1st place, gold medalist(s)	2nd place, silver medalist(s)	3rd place, bronze medalist(s)	Total
1	September 24	1	3	3	7
2	September 25	3	1	3	7
3	September 26	1	2	5	8
4	September 27	1	4	1	6
5	September 28	0	0	3	3
6	September 29	1	0	0	1
7	September 30	3	1	1	5
8	October 1	1	1	1	3
9	October 2	0	2	1	3
10	October 3	3	1	3	7
11	October 4	2	1	1	4
13	October 5	3	0	3	6
14	October 6	1	2	1	4
15	October 7	2	0	5	7

Medals by gender
Gender	1st place, gold medalist(s)	2nd place, silver medalist(s)	3rd place, bronze medalist(s)	Total	Percentage

== Boxing ==
Men

Athlete	Event	Round of 32	Round of 16	Quarter-finals	Semi-finals	Final	Rank
Athlete	Event	Opposition Result	Opposition Result	Opposition Result	Opposition Result	Opposition Result	Rank
Hasanboy Dusmatov	–51 kg	Jo (KOR); W RSC–I	Bibossinov (KAZ); W 4–1	Zohaib Rasheed (PAK); W 5–0	Tomoya Tsuboi (JPN); W 4–1	Thitisan Panmot (THA); W 5–0	1st place, gold medalist(s)
Abdumalik Khalokov	–57 kg	Lee (TPE); W 5–0	Đương (VIE); W 5–0	Carlo Paalam (PHI); W 5–0	Lyu Ping (CHN); W 5–0	Shudai Harada (JPN); W KO	1st place, gold medalist(s)
Ruslan Abdullaev	–63.5 kg	Bye	Chinzorig (MGL); L 0–5	Did not advance			
Asadkhuja Muydinkhujaev	–71 kg	Ryang (PRK); W 5–0	Pianar (PHI); W 5–0	Shymbergenov (KAZ); L RSC	Did not advance		
Turabek Khabibullaev	–80 kg	Shrestha (NEP); W 5–0	Al-Subhi (KSA); W RSC	Ishaish (JOR); W 3–2	Tuohetaerbieke (CHN); L 1–4	Did not advance	3rd place, bronze medalist(s)
Lazizbek Mullojonov	–92kg	Bye	Sanjeet (IND); W 5–0	Han Xuezhen (CHN); L 1–4	Did not advance		
Bakhodir Jalolov	+92 kg	—N/a	Bye	Abroridinov (TJK); W RSC	Danabieke Bayikewuzi (CHN); W KO	Kamshybek Kunkabayev (KAZ); W 4–0	1st place, gold medalist(s)

Women

Athlete	Event	Round of 32	Round of 16	Quarter-finals	Semi-finals	Final	Rank
Athlete	Event	Opposition Result	Opposition Result	Opposition Result	Opposition Result	Opposition Result	Rank
Sabina Bobokulova	51 kg	Bye	Danisha (SGP); W 5–0	Wu Yu (CHN); L 0–5	Did not advance		
Nigina Uktamova	54 kg	—N/a	Magno (PHI); W 5–0	Kinoshita (JPN); W 5–0	Pang (PRK); L 0–5	Did not advance	3rd place, bronze medalist(s)
Sitora Turdibekova	57 kg	—N/a	Zahra (PAK); W 5–0	Hooda (IND); L 0–5	Did not advance		
Raykhona Kodirova	60 kg	—N/a	Al-Jabor (QAT); W RSC	Wu Shih-yi (TPE); L 2–3	Did not advance		
Navbakhor Khamidova	66 kg	—N/a	Suwannapheng (THA); L 0–5	Did not advance			
Aziza Zokirova	75 kg	—N/a	Manikon (THA); L 0–5	Did not advance			

== Chess ==
=== Men ===
Athlete	Event	Round 1	Round 2	Round 3	Round 4	Round 5	Round 6	Round 7	Round 8	Round 9		
Athlete	Event	Opposition Score	Opposition Score	Opposition Score	Opposition Score	Opposition Score	Opposition Score	Opposition Score	Opposition Score	Opposition Score	Pts	Rank
Nodirbek Abdusattorov	Men's individual	Nezad (QAT); W 1–0	Jumabayev (KAZ); W 1–0	Tabatabaei (IRI); W 1–0	Sindarov (UZB); D ½–½	Wei (CHN); W 1–0	Gujrathi (IND); L 0–1	Sumiya (MGL); D ½–½	Erigaisi (IND); W 1–0	Lê (VIE); W 1–0	7	2nd place, silver medalist(s)
Javokhir Sindarov	Men's individual	Kojima (JPN); W 1–0	de Silva (SRI); D ½–½	Tegin (KGZ); W 1–0	Abdusattorov (UZB); D ½–½	Erigaisi (IND); D ½–½	Wei (CHN); L 0–1	Maghsoodloo (IRI); W 1–0	Bu (CHN); W 1–0	Gujrathi (IND); W 1–0	6½	3rd place, bronze medalist(s)

Men's team

Athlete	Event	Round 1	Round 2	Round 3	Round 4	Round 5	Round 6	Round 7	Round 8	Round 9		
Athlete	Event	Opposition Result	Opposition Result	Opposition Result	Opposition Result	Opposition Result	Opposition Result	Opposition Result	Opposition Score	Opposition Result	Total	Rank
Uzbekistan; Nodirbek Abdusattorov; Nodirbek Yakubboev; Jahongir Vakhidov; Shamsiddin Vokhidov; Javokhir Sindarov	Men's team standard	Kyrgyzstan; W 3–1	India; D 2–2	Vietnam; W 3–1	Iran; L 1½–2½	China; D 2–2	Mongolia; W 3–1	South Korea; W 4–0	Kazakhstan; W 3½-½	Thailand; W 4–0	14	3rd place, bronze medalist(s)

Round 1

	Score	
Kyrgyzstan	1–3	Uzbekistan
Eldiiar Orazbaev	0–1	Nodirbek Abdusattorov
Mikhail Markov	0–1	Nodirbek Yakubboev
Ruslan Sezdbekov	½–½	Jakhongir Vakhidov
Erzhan Zhakshylykov	½–½	Shamsiddin Vokhidov

Round 2

	Score	
Uzbekistan	2–2	India
Nodirbek Abdusattorov	½–½	Gukesh D
Javokhir Sindarov	½–½	R Praggnanandhaa
Nodirbek Yakubboev	½–½	Vidit Gujrathi
Shamsiddin Vokhidov	½–½	Arjun Erigaisi

Round 3

	Score	
Vietnam	1–3	Uzbekistan
Lê Quang Liêm	1–0	Nodirbek Abdusattorov
Nguyễn Ngọc Trường Sơn	0–1	Javokhir Sindarov
Lê Tuấn Minh	0–1	Nodirbek Yakubboev
Trần Tuấn Minh	0–1	Shamsiddin Vokhidov

Round 4

	Score	
Uzbekistan	1½–2½	Iran
Nodirbek Abdusattorov	½–½	Parham Maghsoodloo
Javokhir Sindarov	0–1	Amin Tabatabaei
Nodirbek Yakubboev	½–½	Pouya Idani
Shamsiddin Vokhidov	½–½	Bardiya Daneshvar

Round 5

	Score	
Uzbekistan	2–2	China
Nodirbek Abdusattorov	½–½	Wei Yi
Javokhir Sindarov	½–½	Bu Xiangzhi
Jakhongir Vakhidov	0–1	Ma Qun
Shamsiddin Vokhidov	1–0	Xu Xiangyu

Round 6

	Score	
Mongolia	1–3	Uzbekistan
Sumiyagiin Bilgüün	½–½	Nodirbek Abdusattorov
Tsegmed Batchuluun	0–1	Javokhir Sindarov
Sugaryn Gan-Erdene	½–½	Nodirbek Yakubboev
Ganzorig Amartuvshin	0–1	Shamsiddin Vokhidov

Round 7

	Score	
Uzbekistan	4-0	South Korea
Javokhir Sindarov	1–0	Lee Jun-hyeok
Nodirbek Yakubboev	1–0	Kwon Se-hyun
Jakhongir Vakhidov	1–0	Gu In-jung
Shamsiddin Vokhidov	1–0	Ahn Hong-jin

Round 8

	Score	
Uzbekistan	3½-½	Kazakhstan
Nodirbek Abdusattorov	1-0	Rinat Jumabayev
Javokhir Sindarov	1-0	Alisher Suleymenov
Nodirbek Yakubboev	1-0	Ramazan Zhalmakhanov
Shamsiddin Vokhidov	½-½	Aldiyar Ansat

Round 9

	Score	
Thailand	0-4	Uzbekistan
Prin Laohawirapap	0-1	Nodirbek Abdusattorov
Thanadon Kulpruethanon	0-1	Javokhir Sindarov
Warot Kananub	0-1	Nodirbek Yakubboev
Tinnakrit Arunnuntapanich	0-1	Jakhongir Vakhidov

=== Women ===
Athlete	Event	Round 1	Round 2	Round 3	Round 4	Round 5	Round 6	Round 7	Round 8	Round 9		
Athlete	Event	Opposition Score	Opposition Score	Opposition Score	Opposition Score	Opposition Score	Opposition Score	Opposition Score	Opposition Score	Opposition Score	Total	Rank
Umida Omonova	Women's individual	Alawadhi (KUW); W 1–0	Sukandar (INA); W 1–0	Assaubayeva (KAZ); L 0–1	Möngöntuul (MGL); W 1–0	Gong (SGP); W 1–0	Hou (CHN); W 1–0	Zhu (CHN); D ½–½	Abdumalik (KAZ); W 1–0	Phạm (VIE); L 0–1	6½	2nd place, silver medalist(s)
Nilufar Yakubbaeva	Women's individual	Kim (KOR); W 1–0	Zhu (CHN); L 0–1	Proumang (THA); W 1–0	Dronavalli (IND); D ½–½	Humpy (IND); L 0–1	Alali (UAE); L 0–1	Seo (KOR); W 1–0	Alinasab (IRI); L 0–1	Võ (VIE); L 0–1	3½	22

Women's team

Athlete	Event	Round 1	Round 2	Round 3	Round 4	Round 5	Round 6	Round 7	Round 8	Round 9		
Athlete	Event	Opposition Result	Opposition Result	Opposition Result	Opposition Result	Opposition Result	Opposition Result	Opposition Result	Opposition Score	Opposition Result	Total	Rank
Uzbekistan; Umida Omonova; Nilufar Yakubbaeva; Afruza Khamdamova; Marjona Malikova; Maftuna Bobomurodova	Women's team	China; D 2–2	Philippines; D 2–2	Vietnam; L 1½–2½	South Korea; W 4–0	Hong Kong; W 4–0	India; L 0–4	Thailand; W 3½–½	Mongolia; W 2½–1½	Kazakhstan; L0-2	10	6

Round 1

	Score	
China	2–2	Uzbekistan
Hou Yifan	1–0	Nilufar Yakubbaeva
Zhu Jiner	0–1	Umida Omonova
Tan Zhongyi	0–1	Afruza Khamdamova
Zhai Mo	1–0	Marjona Malikova

Round 2

	Score	
Uzbekistan	2–2	Philippines
Nilufar Yakubbaeva	½–½	Janelle Mae Frayna
Umida Omonova	½–½	San Diego Marie
Afruza Khamdamova	½–½	Jan Jodilyn Fronda
Maftuna Bobomurodova	½–½	Shania Mae Mendoza

Round 3

	Score	
Vietnam	2½–1½	Uzbekistan
Phạm Lê Thảo Nguyên	1–0	Nilufar Yakubbaeva
Nguyễn Thị Thanh An	0–1	Umida Omonova
Nguyễn Thị Mai Hưng	½–½	Afruza Khamdamova
Hoàng Thị Bảo Trâm	1–0	Marjona Malikova

Round 4

	Score	
Uzbekistan	4–0	South Korea
Nilufar Yakubbaeva	1–0	Park Sunwoo
Afruza Khamdamova	1–0	Kang Sohyun
Marjona Malikova	1–0	Kim Sa-rang
Maftuna Bobomurodova	1–0	You Garam

Round 5

	Score	
Hong Kong	0–4	Uzbekistan
Feng Euince	0–1	Umida Omonova
Liu Tian Yi	0–1	Afruza Khamdamova
Li Joy Ching	0–1	Marjona Malikova
Liang Liyun	0–1	Maftuna Bobomurodova

Round 6

	Score	
India	4–0	Uzbekistan
Koneru Humpy	1–0	Nilufar Yakubbaeva
R Vaishali	1–0	Umida Omonova
Vantika Agrawal	1–0	Afruza Khamdamova
Baskar Savitha Sri	1–0	Marjona Malikova

Round 7

	Score	
Uzbekistan	3½–½	Thailand
Nilufar Yakubbaeva	1–0	Sarocha Chuemsakul
Umida Omonova	1–0	Araya Prommuang
Afruza Khamdamova	½–½	Melita Sunan Buhagiar
Maftuna Bobomurodova	1–0	Sirin Botsumran

Round 8

	Score	
Uzbekistan	2½–1½	Mongolia
Nilufar Yakubbaeva	0–1	Munkhzul Turmunh
Umida Omonova	1–0	Munguntuul Batkhuyag
Afruza Khamdamova	1–0	Enkhtuul Altan-ulzii
Marjona Malikova	½–½	Bayarmaa Bayarjargal

Round 9

	Score	
Kazakhstan		Uzbekistan

== Football ==
=== Men's tournament ===
Team	Event	Group Stage			Round of 16	Quarterfinal	Semifinal	Final / BM	
Team	Event	Opposition Score	Opposition Score	Rank	Opposition Score	Opposition Score	Opposition Score	Opposition Score	Rank
Uzbekistan men's	Men's tournament	Hong Kong; W 1–0	Hong Kong; W 2–1	1 Q	Indonesia; W 2–0 (AET)	Saudi Arabia; W 2–1	South Korea; L 1–2	Hong Kong; W 4–0	3rd place, bronze medalist(s)

Roster

The following 22 players list is the Uzbekistan squad for the 2022 Asian Games. Originally named in the final squad, Odil Abdumajidov, Saidafzalkhon Akhrorov, Abdurauf Buriev, Abbosbek Fayzullaev and Mukhammadaziz Ibrakhimov withdrew due to their club's refusal to release them.

Head Coach: (Uzbekistan) Timur Kapadze

No.	Pos.	Player	Date of birth (age)	Caps	Goals	Club
1	GK	Abduvohid Nematov	20 March 2001 (aged 22)	18	0	(Uzbekistan Football Association) Nasaf
2	DF	Saidazamat Mirsaidov	19 July 2001 (age 24)	12	0	(Uzbekistan Football Association) Olympic Tashkent
3	DF	Makhmud Makhamadzhonov	30 June 2003 (age 23)	4	1	(Uzbekistan Football Association) Bunyodkor
4	DF	Shokhzhakhon Sultonmurodov	19 March 2001 (age 25)	0	0	(Uzbekistan Football Association) Surkhon Termez
5	DF	Mukhammadkodir Khamraliev	6 July 2001 (age 24)	19	1	(Uzbekistan Football Association) Pakhtakor
6	DF	Bekhzod Shamsiev	4 June 2001 (age 25)	0	0	(Uzbekistan Football Association) Surkhon Termez
7	FW	Khojimat Erkinov	29 May 2001 (aged 22)	11	1	(Russian Football Union) Torpedo Moscow
8	MF	Ibrokhim Ibrokhimov	12 January 2001 (age 25)	10	0	(Uzbekistan Football Association) Metallurg
9	MF	Ulugbek Khoshimov	3 January 2001 (age 25)	17	8	(Uzbekistan Football Association) Neftchi
10	MF	Jasurbek Jaloliddinov	15 May 2002 (age 24)	27	8	(Uzbekistan Football Association) Olympic
11	FW	Otabek Jurakuziev	2 April 2002 (age 24)	16	6	(Uzbekistan Football Association) Olympic
12	GK	Vladimir Nazarov	8 June 2002 (age 24)	13	0	(Uzbekistan Football Association) Neftchi
13	DF	Eldorbek Begimov	29 January 2001 (age 25)	13	1	(Uzbekistan Football Association) AGMK
14	MF	Ibrokhimkhalil Yuldoshev	14 February 2001 (aged 22)	3	0	(Russian Football Union) Nizhny Novgorod
15	MF	Sherzod Esanov	1 February 2003 (age 23)	0	0	(Uzbekistan Football Association) Olympic
16	DF	Asadbek Rakhimzhonov	17 February 2004 (age 22)	0	0	(Uzbekistan Football Association) Olympic
17	MF	Diyor Kholmatov	22 July 2002 (age 23)	13	1	(Uzbekistan Football Association) Pakhtakor
18	DF	Alibek Davronov	28 December 2002 (age 23)	11	1	(Uzbekistan Football Association) Nasaf
19	FW	Khusayin Norchaev	6 February 2002 (age 24)	14	8	(Russian Football Union) Alania Vladikavkaz
20	FW	Ruslanbek Jiyanov	5 June 2001 (age 25)	19	2	(Russian Football Union) Nizhny Novgorod
21	GK	Khamidullo Abdunabiev	20 August 2002 (age 23)	4	0	(Uzbekistan Football Association) Olympic
22	FW	Alisher Odilov	15 July 2001 (age 24)	17	5	(Uzbekistan Football Association) Olympic

Group C

Pos	Team	Pld	W	D	L	GF	GA	GD	Pts	Qualification
1	Uzbekistan	2	2	0	0	3	1	+2	6	Knockout stage
2	Hong Kong	2	0	0	2	1	3	−2	0	Knockout stage
3	Syria	0	0	0	0	0	0	0	0	Withdrew
4	Afghanistan	0	0	0	0	0	0	0	0	Withdrew

Source: Football – Men – Groups
Rules for classification: Group stage tiebreakers
22 September 2023
19:30

Hong Kong	0–1	Uzbekistan
	Report	Khoshimov 65'

Shangcheng Sports Centre Stadium, Hangzhou
Attendance: 7,638
Referee: Ngô Duy Lân (Vietnam)

25 September 2023
16:00

Uzbekistan	2–1	Hong Kong
Davronov 64'; Jaloliddinov 70'	Report	Li Ngai Hoi 4'

Shangcheng Sports Centre Stadium, Hangzhou
Attendance: 8,784
Referee: Jansen Foo (Singapore)

Round of 16

28 September 2023
16:30 UTC+8

Uzbekistan	2–0 (a.e.t.)	Indonesia
Esanov 92', 120+1'	Report

Shangcheng Sports Centre Stadium, Hangzhou
Attendance: 9,466
Referee: Mohammed Ahmed Al-Shammari (Qatar)

Quarter-final

1 October 2023
15:00 UTC+8

Uzbekistan	2–1	Saudi Arabia
Mirsaidov 24'; Odilov 43'	Report	Maran 66'

Huanglong Sports Centre Stadium, Hangzhou
Attendance: 38,088
Referee: Ammar Mahfoodh (Bahrain)

Semi-final

4 October 2023
20:00 UTC+8

South Korea	2–1	Uzbekistan
Jeong Woo-yeong 3', 38'	Report	Jaloliddinov 25'

Huanglong Sports Centre Stadium, Hangzhou
Attendance: 38,019
Referee: Ammar Ashkanani (Kuwait)

Bronze medal match

7 October 2023
16:00 UTC+8

Uzbekistan	4–0	Hong Kong
Odilov 43'; Norchaev 50', 59'; Davronov 75'	Report

Shangcheng Sports Centre Stadium, Hangzhou
Attendance: 9,825
Referee: Ngô Duy Lân (Vietnam)

=== Women's tournament ===
Team	Event	Group Stage			Quarterfinal	Semifinal	Final / BM	
Team	Event	Opposition Score	Opposition Score	Rank	Opposition Score	Opposition Score	Opposition Score	Rank
Uzbekistan men's	Women's tournament	Mongolia; W 6–0	China; L 0–6	2 Q	Chinese Taipei; W 2–1 (AET)	North Korea; L 0–8	China; L 0–7	4

Group A

Pos	Team	Pld	W	D	L	GF	GA	GD	Pts	Qualification
1	China (H)	2	2	0	0	22	0	+22	6	Knockout stage
2	Uzbekistan	2	1	0	1	6	6	0	3	Knockout stage
3	Mongolia	2	0	0	2	0	22	−22	0	
4	Iran	0	0	0	0	0	0	0	0	Withdrew

Source: Football – Women – Groups
Rules for classification: Group stage tiebreakers
(H) Hosts
25 September 2023
19:30 UTC+8

Mongolia	0–6	Uzbekistan
	Report	Norboeva 36'; Tojiddinova 45+2'; Shoyimova 58'; Khabibullaeva 78', 90+5'; Kudratova 85'

Linping Sports Center Stadium, Hangzhou
Attendance: 6,841
Referee: RD Tekcham (India)

28 September 2023
19:30 UTC+8

Uzbekistan	0–6	China
	Report	Wang Shanshan 33', 50'; Shen Mengyu 52'; Chen Qiaozhu 56'; Yan Jinjin 78' (pen.), 90+4'

Linping Sports Center Stadium, Hangzhou
Attendance: 7,523
Referee: Thein Thein Aye (Myanmar)

Quarter-final

30 September 2023
15:00 UTC+8

Chinese Taipei	1–2 (a.e.t.)	Uzbekistan
Su Yu-hsuan 86'	Report	Khabibullaeva 52'; Zoirova 101'

Linping Sports Center Stadium, Hangzhou
Attendance: 7,515
Referee: Law Bik Chi (Hong Kong)

Semi-final

3 October 2023
18:00 UTC+8

Uzbekistan	0–8	North Korea
	Report	Hong Song-ok 9'; Kim Kyong-yong 18' (pen.), 46', 63', 83'; An Myong-Song 45+2'; Ri Hak 50'; Kim Hye-yong 90+1'

Shangcheng Sports Centre Stadium, Hangzhou
Attendance: 10,402
Referee: Le Thi Ly (Vietnam)

Bronze medal match

6 October 2023
15:00 UTC+8

(bronze) China	7–0	Uzbekistan
Ou Yiyao 1'; Chen Qiaozhu 26', 62'; Wang Shanshan 45'; Wurigumula 59'; Gu Yasha 65'; Yao Wei 67'	Report

Huanglong Sports Centre Stadium, Hangzhou
Attendance: 38,029
Referee: Asaka Koizumi (Japan)

== Judo ==
Uzbekistan sent their judoka to compete at the Games.

Key:

- 1st number — Ippon
- 2nd number — Waza-ari
- s — Shido

Men

Athlete	Event	Round of 32	Round of 16	Quarter-finals	Semi-finals	Repechage	Final / BM	Rank
Athlete	Event	Opposition Result	Opposition Result	Opposition Result	Opposition Result	Opposition Result	Opposition Result	Rank
Dilshodbek Baratov	–60 kg	Bye	Chae (PRK); L 00s3–10s2	Did not advance				
Sardor Nurillaev	–66 kg	Bye	Agamammedov (TKM); W 01–00s1	Kyrgyzbayev (KAZ); W 10s1–00s3	Yondonperenlei (MGL); L 00s1–10s2	Bye	Bayanmönkhiin (UAE); L 00–10s1	4
Murodjon Yuldoshev	–73 kg	Bye	Hajali (BRN); W 10s2–00s3	Kim (PRK); W 10s1–00s3	Tsend-Ochir (MGL); W 10s2–00s3	—N/a	Hashimoto (JPN); W 01s2–00	1st place, gold medalist(s)
Muso Sobirov	–81 kg	Bye	Bùi (VIE); W 10–00	Lee (KOR); L 00–10	Did not advance	Gereltuyaagiin (MGL); W 10–00	Zhubanazar (KAZ); L 01s2–11s2	4
Davlat Bobonov	–90 kg	Bye	Maraev (BRN); W 10s2-00s3	Han (KOR); W 10-00s2	Gantulga (MGL); W 10s1-00s1	—N/a	Sherov (KGZ); L 00s2-01s2	2nd place, silver medalist(s)
Muzaffarbek Turoboyev	–100 kg	Bye		Majanow (TKM); W 11s1-00s1	Sharkhan (KAZ); W 11–00	—N/a	Batkhuyag (MGL); W 10–1	1st place, gold medalist(s)
Alisher Yusupov	+100 kg	—N/a	Bye	Krikbay (KAZ); W' 10–00	Magomedomarov (UAE); L 1-10s1	Bye	Ota (JPN); W 10–00	3rd place, bronze medalist(s)

Women

Athlete	Event	Round of 16	Quarter-finals	Semi-finals	Repechage	Final / BM	Rank
Athlete	Event	Opposition Result	Opposition Result	Opposition Result	Opposition Result	Opposition Result	Rank
Khalimajon Kurbonova	–48 kg	Kurbanowa (TKM); W 01–00s1	Guo (CHN); L 00s3–10s2	Did not advance	Wong (HKG); W 10–00	Lee (KOR); W 10–DNS	3rd place, bronze medalist(s)
Diyora Keldiyorova	–52 kg	Bye	Muminova (TJK); W 10–00	Lkhagvasüren (MGL); W 01s2–00s1	—N/a	Khorloodoi (UAE); W 10–00s3	1st place, gold medalist(s)
Shukurjon Aminova	–57 kg	Nguyễn (VIE); W 10–00	Tamaoki (JPN); L 00–10	Did not advance	Pardaýewa (TKM); L 00s1–10s2	Did not advance	
Sevinch Isokova	–63 kg	Leung (HKG); W 10–DNS	Kochkonbaeva (KGZ); W 10s1–00s1	Tang (CHN); L 00–10	Bye	Kuyulova (KAZ); L 01s2–10s1	4
Gulnoza Matniyazova	–70 kg	Kuok (MAC); W 10s2–00s2	Barbat (IRI); W 10–00	Mun (PRK); L 00s3–10s2	Bye	Liao (TPE); W 10s1–00s2	3rd place, bronze medalist(s)
Iriskhon Kurbanbaeva	–78 kg	Kim (PRK); W 10–00	Jangeldina (KAZ); W 1s2-0s2	Zhao (CHN); L 10s1-0	Bye	Otgonbayar (MGL); W 0–10	3rd place, bronze medalist(s)
Rinata Ilmatova	+78 kg	Joshi (NEP); W 10–00	Hayun (KOR); L 0s1-10	Did not advance	Berlikash (KAZ); L 0s1-10	Did not advance	

Mixed

Athlete	Event	Round of 16	Quarter-finals	Semi-finals	Repechage	Final / BM	Rank
Athlete	Event	Opposition Result	Opposition Result	Opposition Result	Opposition Result	Opposition Result	Rank
Shokhrukhkhon Bakhtiyorov; Davlat Bobonov; Sardor Nurillaev; Muso Sobirov; Murodjon Yuldoshev; Alisher Yusupov; Shukurjon Aminova; Rinata Ilmatova; Sevinch Isokova; Diyora Keldiyorova; Iriskhon Kurbanbaeva; Gulnoza Matniyazova	Team	Bye	Thailand (THA); W 4–0	China (CHN); W 4–2	—N/a	Japan (JPN); L 0–4	2nd place, silver medalist(s)

== Kurash ==
Men

Athlete	Event	Round of 16	Quarter-finals	Semi-finals	Final	
Athlete	Event	Opposition Score	Opposition Score	Opposition Score	Opposition Score	Rank
Artyom Shturbabin	–66 kg	Bye	Benavidez (PHI); W 10–0	Kwon (KOR); W 10–0	Barimanlou (IRI); W 8–0	1st place, gold medalist(s)
Umid Esanov	–81 kg	Lê (VIE); W 10–0	Escarpe (PHI); W 10–0	Rasooli (AFG); W 10–0	Shaimerdenov (KAZ); W 10–0	1st place, gold medalist(s)
Mukhsin Khisomiddinov	+90 kg	Chen (TPE); W 10–0	Bani Saad (IRQ); W 10–0	Yea On (THA); W 5–0	Tejenov (TKM); W 5–0	1st place, gold medalist(s)

Women

Athlete	Event	Round of 32	Round of 16	Quarter-finals	Semi-finals	Final	
Athlete	Event	Opposition Score	Opposition Score	Opposition Score	Opposition Score	Opposition Score	Rank
Khilola Ortikboeva	–52 kg	Bye	Quelino (PHI); W 10–0	Abeuova (KAZ); W 10–0	Amanova (TKM); W 10–0	Elmurodova (UZB); W 10–0	1st place, gold medalist(s)
Sitora Elmurodova	–52 kg	Bye	Adazkhan (KAZ); W 5–0	Balhara (IND); W 0–0	Homklin (THA); W 10–0	Ortikboeva (UZB); L 0–10	2nd place, silver medalist(s)
Malikakhon Kakhorova	–70 kg	—N/a	Lee (KOR); W 10–0	Almwlld (KSA); W 10–0	Aghaei (IRI); L 0–5	Did not advance	3rd place, bronze medalist(s)
Ravzakhon Adasheva	–70 kg	—N/a	Bye	Yu (CHN); L 0–10	Did not advance		

== Rowing ==
Men

Athlete	Event	Heats		Repechage		Final	
Athlete	Event	Time	Rank	Time	Rank	Time	Rank
Shakhboz Kholmurzaev; Mekhrojbek Mamatkulov	Double sculls	6:16.35	1 FA	—N/a		6:26.25	2nd place, silver medalist(s)
Shakhzod Nurmatov; Shakhboz Kholmurzaev; Mekhrojbek Mamatkulov; Sobirjon Safaroliev	Quadruple sculls	6:05.12	1 FA	—N/a		6:04.64	2nd place, silver medalist(s)
Shekhroz Hakimov; Dilshodjon Khudoyberdiev	Coxless pair	6:33.37	1 FA	—N/a		6:48.11	2nd place, silver medalist(s)
Shehroz Hakimov; Dilshodjon Khudoyberdiev; Davrjon Davronov; Alisher Turdiev	Coxless four	6:13.06	1 FA	—N/a		6:04.96	1st place, gold medalist(s)
Anatoliy Krasnov; Uktamjon Davronov; Shukhrat Shodiev; Fazliddin Karimov; Zafar Usmonov; Alisher Turdiev; Davrjon Davronov; Evgeniy Agafonov; Farrukh Oblakulov(c)	Men's eight	5:41.97	3 FA	—N/a		5:45.92	4
Shakhzod Nurmatov; Sobirjon Safaroliev	Men's lightweight double sculls	6:20.00	1 FA	—N/a		6:33.42	3rd place, bronze medalist(s)

Women

Athlete	Event	Heats		Repechage		Final	
Athlete	Event	Time	Rank	Time	Rank	Time	Rank
Anna Prakaten	Women's single sculls	7:42.24	1 SF	7:47.88	1 F	7:39.05	1st place, gold medalist(s)
Luizakhon Islomova; Malika Tagmatova	Women's lightweight double sculls	7:01.80	2 R	7:40.59	1 F	7:16.49	2nd place, silver medalist(s)

== Sport climbing ==
Speed

Athlete	Event	Qualification		Round of 16	Quarter-finals	Semi-finals	Final / BM	
Athlete	Event	Best	Rank	Opposition Time	Opposition Time	Opposition Time	Opposition Time	Rank
Mark Rogalev	Men's	6.975	19 Q	Did not advance				
Asal Islamova	Women's	12.077	15 Q	Deng (CHN); L 12.627–6.947	Did not advance			

Combined

Athlete	Event	Qualification				Semi-finals				Final			
Athlete	Event	Boulder Point	Lead Point	Total	Rank	Boulder Point	Lead Point	Total	Rank	Boulder Point	Lead Point	Total	Rank
Artyom Baranov	Men's	8.7	18.1	26.8	21	Did not advance							
Asal Islamova	Women's	29.7	6.1	35.8	21	Did not advance				Cancelled (Note: The women's boulder and lead final has been cancelled due to rain and safety of the athletes. The semi-finals result would be used as final result.)			
Iroda Rapikova	Women's	9.3	5	14.3	22	Did not advance				Cancelled			

== Taekwondo ==
Kyorugi

Athlete	Event	Round of 32	Round of 16	Quarter-finals	Semi-finals	Final	
Athlete	Event	Opposition Score	Opposition Score	Opposition Score	Opposition Score	Opposition Score	Rank
Omonjon Otajonov	Men's −58 kg	Barbosa (PHI); W 2–0	Hajimousaeinafouti (IRI); L 0–2	Did not advance			
Niyaz Pulatov	Men's −63 kg	Bye	Lee (KOR); L 0–2	Did not advance			
Ulugbek Rashitov	Men's −68 kg	Bye	Lo (HKG); W 2–0	Chiu (TPE); W 2–0	Jin (KOR); W 2–0	Abdul Kareem (JOR); W 2–0	1st place, gold medalist(s)
Jasurbek Jaysunov	Men's −80 kg	Bye	Alenezi (KUW); W 2–0	Elsharabaty (JOR); L 1–2	Did not advance		
Nikita Rafalovich	Men's +80 kg	—N/a	Bye	Lee (TPE); L 1–2	Did not advance		
Madinabonu Mannopova	Women's −49 kg	Bye	Kong (MAC); W 2–0	Trương (VIE); W 2–0	Wongpattanakit (THA); L 0–2	Did not advance	3rd place, bronze medalist(s)
Charos Kayumova	Women's −53 kg	Bye	So (HKG); W 2–0	Canabal (PHI); W 2–1	Lin (TPE); L 1–2	Did not advance	3rd place, bronze medalist(s)
Madina Mirabzalova	Women's −57 kg	—N/a	Oimatova (TJK); W 2–0	Lo (TPE); L 0–2	Did not advance		
Feruza Sadikova	Women's −67 kg	—N/a	Tongchan (THA); W 2–0	Khussainova (KAZ); W 2–1	Mirhosseini (IRI); W 2–1	Song (CHN); L 0–2	2nd place, silver medalist(s)
Svetlana Osipova	Women's +67 kg	—N/a	Bye	Tavakoli (IRI); W 2–1	Zhou (CHN); L 1–2	Did not advance	3rd place, bronze medalist(s)
Jasurbek Jaysunov; Shukhrat Salaev; Svetlana Osipova; Ozoda Sobirjonova	Mixed team	—N/a		Hong Kong (HKG); W 101–4	South Korea (KOR); L 47–48	Did not advance	3rd place, bronze medalist(s)

Mixed

Athlete	Event	Round of 16	Quarter-finals	Semi-finals	Repechage	Final / BM	Rank
Athlete	Event	Opposition Result	Opposition Result	Opposition Result	Opposition Result	Opposition Result	Rank
Jasurbek Jaysunov; Shukhrat Salaev; Svetlana Osipova; Ozoda Sobirjonova	Team	Bye	Hong Kong (HKG); W101-4	South Korea (KOR); L47-48	-	Did not advance	3rd place, bronze medalist(s)

== Tennis ==
Men

Athlete	Event	Round of 64	Round of 32	Round of 16	Quarter-finals	Semi-finals	Final	
Athlete	Event	Opposition Score	Opposition Score	Opposition Score	Opposition Score	Opposition Score	Opposition Score	Rank
Khumoyun Sultanov	Singles	Bye	A Khan (PAK); W 6–0, 6–1	K Samrej (THA); W 6–4, 6–2	Tseng C-h (TPE); W 4–6, 7–6, 6–1	Zhang ZZ (CHN); L 4–6, 1–6	Did not advance	3rd place, bronze medalist(s)
Sergey Fomin	Singles	Bye	B Al-Qahtani (KUW); W 6–0, 6–4	Hong S-c (KOR); L 4–6, 1–4	Did not advance			
Sergey Fomin; Khumoyun Sultanov	Doubles	Bye	B Al-Qahtani / A Mubarak (KUW); W 6–3, 6–1	R Bopanna / Y Bhambri (IND); W 2–6, 6–3^{10–6}	Hsu Y-h / J Jung (TPE); L 2–6, 3–6	Did not advance		
Amir Milushev; Maxim Shin	Doubles	Bye	A Susanto / D A Susanto (INA); L 2–6, 7–5	Did not advance				

Women

Athlete	Event	Round of 64	Round of 32	Round of 16	Quarter-finals	Semi-finals	Final	
Athlete	Event	Opposition Score	Opposition Score	Opposition Score	Opposition Score	Opposition Score	Opposition Score	Rank
Sevil Yuldasheva	Singles	Bye	Lee Y-h (TPE); L 3–6, 3–6	Did not advance				
Sabrina Olimjanova	Singles	Bye	S Huỳnh (VIE); W 6–0, 6–0	A Raina (IND); L 0–6, 0–6	Did not advance			
Shahnoza Marimova; Sabrina Olimjanova	Doubles	—N/a	Lee Y-h / Liang E-s (TPE); L 3–6, 5–7	Did not advance				
Akgul Amanmuradova; Sevil Yuldasheva	Doubles	—N/a	A Sutjiadi / J Tjen (INA); L 2–6, 4–6	Did not advance				

Mixed

Athlete	Event	Round of 64	Round of 32	Round of 16	Quarter-finals	Semi-finals	Final	
Athlete	Event	Opposition Score	Opposition Score	Opposition Score	Opposition Score	Opposition Score	Opposition Score	Rank
Shahnoza Marimova; Amir Milushev	Doubles	Bye	Zhu L / Bu YCK (CHN); L 0–6, 0–6	Did not advance				
Akgul Amanmuradova; Maksim Shin	Doubles	Bye	R Bhosale / R Bopanna (IND); L 2–6, 4–6	Did not advance				

== Wushu ==
=== Taolu ===
Athlete	Event	Event 1		Event 2		Total	Rank
Athlete	Event	Result	Rank	Result	Rank	Total	Rank
Aziz Kakhramonov	Men's changquan	9.643	8	—N/a		9.643	8
Darya Latisheva	Women's nanquan and nandao	9.700	3	9.703	3	19.403	3rd place, bronze medalist(s)

=== Sanda ===
Athlete	Event	Round of 16	Quarter-finals	Semi-finals	Final	
Athlete	Event	Opposition Score	Opposition Score	Opposition Score	Opposition Score	Rank
Jamshidbek Guliboev	Men's –56 kg	Bye	Mandal (PHI); L 0–2	Did not advance		
Islombek Khaydarov	Men's –60 kg	Singh (IND); L 1–2	Did not advance			
Mukhammadali Yuldashev	Men's –70 kg	Bye	He (CHN); L 0–2	Did not advance		
Azizbek Isroilov	Men's –75 kg	Bye	Sabri (IRI); L KO	Did not advance		

== See also ==
- Uzbekistan at the 2022 Asian Para Games
