= Taekwondo at the 2022 Asian Games =

Taekwondo competition

- Venue: Lin'an Sports and Culture Centre
- Dates: 24–28 September 2023
- Competitors: 223 from 38 nations

Taekwondo at the 2022 Asian Games was held at the Lin'an Sports and Culture Centre, Hangzhou, China, from 24 to 28 September 2023.

== Schedule ==
P	Preliminary rounds	F	Semifinals & Final

Event↓/Date →	24th Sun		25th Mon		26th Tue		27th Wed		28th Thu	
Men's poomsae	P	F								
Men's 58 kg			P	F						
Men's 63 kg					P	F				
Men's 68 kg							P	F		
Men's 80 kg							P	F		
Men's +80 kg									P	F
Women's poomsae	P	F								
Women's 49 kg			P	F						
Women's 53 kg					P	F				
Women's 57 kg					P	F				
Women's 67 kg							P	F		
Women's +67 kg									P	F
Mixed team			P	F						

== Medalists ==
=== Men ===
Event	Gold	Silver	Bronze
Poomsae	Kang Wan-jin; South Korea	Ma Yun-zhong; Chinese Taipei	Trần Hồ Duy; Vietnam
Poomsae	Kang Wan-jin; South Korea	Ma Yun-zhong; Chinese Taipei	Patrick King Perez; Philippines
Flyweight (−58 kg)	Jang Jun; South Korea	Mehdi Haji Mousaei; Iran	Mohsen Rezaee; Afghanistan
Flyweight (−58 kg)	Jang Jun; South Korea	Mehdi Haji Mousaei; Iran	Cheng Kai; China
Bantamweight (−63 kg)	Banlung Tubtimdang; Thailand	Alireza Hosseinpour; Iran	Liang Yushuai; China
Bantamweight (−63 kg)	Banlung Tubtimdang; Thailand	Alireza Hosseinpour; Iran	Zaid Al-Halawani; Jordan
Featherweight (−68 kg)	Ulugbek Rashitov; Uzbekistan	Zaid Kareem; Jordan	Matin Rezaei; Iran
Featherweight (−68 kg)	Ulugbek Rashitov; Uzbekistan	Zaid Kareem; Jordan	Jin Ho-jun; South Korea
Welterweight (−80 kg)	Park Woo-hyeok; South Korea	Saleh El-Sharabaty; Jordan	Saif Taher; Iraq
Welterweight (−80 kg)	Park Woo-hyeok; South Korea	Saleh El-Sharabaty; Jordan	Mehran Barkhordari; Iran
Heavyweight (+80 kg)	Song Zhaoxiang; China	Arian Salimi; Iran	Lee Meng-en; Chinese Taipei
Heavyweight (+80 kg)	Song Zhaoxiang; China	Arian Salimi; Iran	Smaiyl Duisebay; Kazakhstan

=== Women ===
Event	Gold	Silver	Bronze
Poomsae	Cha Yea-eun; South Korea	Yuiko Niwa; Japan	Chen Hsin-ya; Chinese Taipei
Poomsae	Cha Yea-eun; South Korea	Yuiko Niwa; Japan	Marjan Salahshouri; Iran
Flyweight (−49 kg)	Panipak Wongpattanakit; Thailand	Guo Qing; China	Madinabonu Mannopova; Uzbekistan
Flyweight (−49 kg)	Panipak Wongpattanakit; Thailand	Guo Qing; China	Mobina Nematzadeh; Iran
Bantamweight (−53 kg)	Park Hye-jin; South Korea	Lin Wei-chun; Chinese Taipei	Chutikan Jongkolrattanawattana; Thailand
Bantamweight (−53 kg)	Park Hye-jin; South Korea	Lin Wei-chun; Chinese Taipei	Charos Kayumova; Uzbekistan
Featherweight (−57 kg)	Luo Zongshi; China	Lo Chia-ling; Chinese Taipei	Kim Yu-jin; South Korea
Featherweight (−57 kg)	Luo Zongshi; China	Lo Chia-ling; Chinese Taipei	Phannapa Harnsujin; Thailand
Welterweight (−67 kg)	Song Jie; China	Feruza Sadikova; Uzbekistan	Melika Mirhosseini; Iran
Welterweight (−67 kg)	Song Jie; China	Feruza Sadikova; Uzbekistan	Bạc Thị Khiêm; Vietnam
Heavyweight (+67 kg)	Zhou Zeqi; China	Lee Da-bin; South Korea	Svetlana Osipova; Uzbekistan
Heavyweight (+67 kg)	Zhou Zeqi; China	Lee Da-bin; South Korea	Cansel Deniz; Kazakhstan

=== Mixed ===
Event	Gold	Silver	Bronze
Team	China; Cui Yang; Song Zhaoxiang; Song Jie; Zhou Zeqi	South Korea; Park Woo-hyeok; Seo Geon-woo; Kim Jan-di; Lee Da-bin	Vietnam; Lý Hồng Phúc; Phạm Minh Bảo Kha; Bạc Thị Khiêm; Phạm Ngọc Châm
Team	China; Cui Yang; Song Zhaoxiang; Song Jie; Zhou Zeqi	South Korea; Park Woo-hyeok; Seo Geon-woo; Kim Jan-di; Lee Da-bin	Uzbekistan; Jasurbek Jaysunov; Shukhrat Salaev; Svetlana Osipova; Ozoda Sobirjonova

== Medal table ==
Rank	Nation	Gold	Silver	Bronze	Total
1	South Korea (KOR)	5	2	2	9
2	China (CHN)	5	1	2	8
3	Thailand (THA)	2	0	2	4
4	Uzbekistan (UZB)	1	1	4	6
5	Iran (IRI)	0	3	5	8
6	Chinese Taipei (TPE)	0	3	2	5
7	Jordan (JOR)	0	2	1	3
8	Japan (JPN)	0	1	0	1
9	Vietnam (VIE)	0	0	3	3
10	Kazakhstan (KAZ)	0	0	2	2
11	Afghanistan (AFG)	0	0	1	1
11	Iraq (IRQ)	0	0	1	1
11	Philippines (PHI)	0	0	1	1
Totals (13 entries)		13	13	26	52

== Participating nations ==
A total of 223 athletes from 38 nations competed in taekwondo at the 2022 Asian Games:

- Afghanistan (5)
- Bahrain (1)
- Bangladesh (3)
- Bhutan (4)
- Cambodia (5)
- China (10)
- Chinese Taipei (12)
- Hong Kong (8)
- India (2)
- Indonesia (3)
- Iran (12)
- Iraq (2)
- Japan (6)
- Jordan (6)
- Kazakhstan (10)
- Kuwait (2)
- Kyrgyzstan (2)
- Laos (4)
- Lebanon (6)
- Macau (5)
- Malaysia (2)
- Mongolia (4)
- Myanmar (1)
- Nepal (11)
- Pakistan (5)
- Palestine (4)
- Philippines (12)
- Qatar (6)
- Saudi Arabia (8)
- Singapore (3)
- South Korea (13)
- Sri Lanka (2)
- Tajikistan (6)
- Thailand (10)
- Timor-Leste (4)
- United Arab Emirates (2)
- Uzbekistan (12)
- Vietnam (10)
