= Tennis at the 2022 Asian Games – Men's singles =

Men's singles at the 2022 Asian Games
- Venue: Hangzhou Olympic Expo Tennis Center
- Dates: 24–30 September 2023
- Competitors: 38 from 21 nations

Medalists
| gold medal | Zhang Zhizhen | China |
| silver medal | Yosuke Watanuki | Japan |
| bronze medal | Khumoyun Sultanov | Uzbekistan |
| bronze medal | Hong Seong-chan | South Korea |

Men's singles
- Tennis at the 2022 Asian Games

Events
| Singles | men | women |
| Doubles | men | women | mixed |
- Asian Games

The men's singles tennis event at the 2022 Asian Games took place at the Tennis Court of Hangzhou Olympic Expo Center, Hangzhou, China from 24 to 30 September 2023.

== Schedule ==
All times are China Standard Time (UTC+08:00)

| Date | Time | Event |
|---|---|---|
| Sunday, 24 September 2023 | 12:00 | Round 1 |
| Sunday, 24 September 2023 | 12:00 | Round 2 |
| Monday, 25 September 2023 | 10:00 | Round 2 |
| Tuesday, 26 September 2023 | 10:00 | Round 3 |
| Wednesday, 27 September 2023 | 10:00 | Quarterfinals |
| Thursday, 28 September 2023 | 10:00 | Semifinals |
| Saturday, 30 September 2023 | 10:00 | Final |

== Results ==
Legend

- r — Retired
- WO — Won by walkover

=== Finals ===
| Semifinals | | | | Final |
| 1 | Zhang Zhizhen (CHN) | 6 | 6 |
| 13 | Khumoyun Sultanov (UZB) | 4 | 1 | 1 | Zhang Zhizhen (CHN) | 6 | 7^{9} |
| 8 | Hong Seong-chan (KOR) | 2 | 1 | 2 | Yosuke Watanuki (JPN) | 4 | 6^{7} |
| 2 | Yosuke Watanuki (JPN) | 6 | 6 |

=== Top half ===
==== Section 1 ====
Round 1
Rashed Nawaf (QAT) | 0 | 0
Ammar Al-Haqbani (KSA) | 6 | 6

Round 2
1 | Zhang Zhizhen (CHN) | 7 | 6
Ammar Al-Haqbani (KSA) | 5 | 2
Wong Hong Kit (HKG) | 7 | 4 | 2
15 | Muhammad Rifqi Fitriadi (INA) | 5 | 6 | 6
10 | Beibit Zhukayev (KAZ) | 3
Firuz Mukhidinov (TJK) | 0^{r}
Marco Leung (MAC) | 0 | 0
5 | Sumit Nagal (IND) | 6 | 6

Round 3
1 | Zhang Zhizhen (CHN) | 6 | 6
15 | Muhammad Rifqi Fitriadi (INA) | 3 | 3
10 | Beibit Zhukayev (KAZ) | 6^{9} | 4
5 | Sumit Nagal (IND) | 7^{11} | 6

Quarterfinals
1 | Zhang Zhizhen (CHN) | 6^{3} | 6 | 6
5 | Sumit Nagal (IND) | 7^{7} | 1 | 2

==== Section 2 ====
Round 1
Essa Qabazard (KUW) | 1 | 4
Kasidit Samrej (THA) | 6 | 6
Pradip Khadka (NEP) | 6 | 6
António Mendes (TLS) | 0 | 0

Round 2
4 | Kwon Soon-woo (KOR) | 3 | 7 | 4
Kasidit Samrej (THA) | 6 | 5 | 6
Aqeel Khan (PAK) | 0 | 1
13 | Khumoyun Sultanov (UZB) | 6 | 6
11 | Tseng Chun-hsin (TPE) | 6 | 6
Baataryn Oyuunbat (MGL) | 0 | 0
Pradip Khadka (NEP) | 5 | 1
7 | Shintaro Mochizuki (JPN) | 7 | 6

Round 3
Kasidit Samrej (THA) | 4 | 2
13 | Khumoyun Sultanov (UZB) | 6 | 6
11 | Tseng Chun-hsin (TPE) | 7^{7} | 6
7 | Shintaro Mochizuki (JPN) | 6^{4} | 2

Quarterfinals
13 | Khumoyun Sultanov (UZB) | 4 | 7^{7} | 6
11 | Tseng Chun-hsin (TPE) | 6 | 6^{4} | 1

=== Bottom half ===
==== Section 3 ====
Round 1
Bader Al-Qahtani (KUW) | 0 | 4
Sergey Fomin (UZB) | 6 | 6
Justin Barki (INA) | 6 | 6
Kyle Tang (MAC) | 3 | 2

Round 2
8 | Hong Seong-chan (KOR) | 6 | 4
Sergey Fomin (UZB) | 1 | 1^{r}
Mönkhbaataryn Badrakh (MGL) | 1 | 2
12 | Lý Hoàng Nam (VIE) | 6 | 6
14 | Coleman Wong (HKG) | 6 | 6
Abhishek Bastola (NEP) | 2 | 0
Justin Barki (INA) | 5 | 1
3 | Wu Yibing (CHN) | 7 | 6

Round 3
8 | Hong Seong-chan (KOR) | 6 | 6
12 | Lý Hoàng Nam (VIE) | 1 | 4
14 | Coleman Wong (HKG) | 6 | 3 | 7^{8}
3 | Wu Yibing (CHN) | 4 | 6 | 6^{6}

Quarterfinals
8 | Hong Seong-chan (KOR) | 4 | 6 | 6
14 | Coleman Wong (HKG) | 6 | 4 | 3

==== Section 4 ====
Round 1
Mubarak Al-Harrasi (QAT) | 7 | 0
Palaphoom Kovapitukted (THA) | 5 | 0^{r}

Round 2
6 | Wu Tung-lin (TPE) | 6 | 6
Sina Moghimi (IRI) | 2 | 1
Agapito Ferreira (TLS) | 0 | 0
9 | Denis Yevseyev (KAZ) | 6 | 6
16 | Ramkumar Ramanathan (IND) | W | O
Sunatullo Isroilov (TJK)
Mubarak Al-Harrasi (QAT) | 2 | 3
2 | Yosuke Watanuki (JPN) | 6 | 6

Round 3
6 | Wu Tung-lin (TPE) | 6 | 3 | 4
9 | Denis Yevseyev (KAZ) | 2 | 6 | 6
16 | Ramkumar Ramanathan (IND) | 5 | 7^{7} | 5
2 | Yosuke Watanuki (JPN) | 7 | 6^{3} | 7

Quarterfinals
9 | Denis Yevseyev (KAZ) | 1 | 1
2 | Yosuke Watanuki (JPN) | 6 | 6
