= Kurash at the 2022 Asian Games – Men's 81 kg =

Men's 81 kg at the 2022 Asian Games
- Venue: Xiaoshan Linpu Gymnasium
- Dates: 1 October 2023
- Competitors: 13 from 13 nations

Medalists
gold medal	Umid Esanov	Uzbekistan
silver medal	Bekadil Shaimerdenov	Kazakhstan
bronze medal	Huang Chun-ta	Chinese Taipei
bronze medal	Hassan Baiqara Rasooli	Afghanistan

The men's 81 kilograms Kurash competition at the 2022 Asian Games in Hangzhou was held on 1 October 2023 at the Xiaoshan Linpu Gymnasium.

Kurash is a traditional martial art from Uzbekistan that resembles Wrestling. There are three assessment system in Kurash, namely Halal, Yambosh, and Chala.

== Schedule ==
All times are China Standard Time (UTC+08:00)

Date	Time	Event
Sunday, 1 October 2023	09:30	Round of 16
Sunday, 1 October 2023	09:30	Quarterfinals
Sunday, 1 October 2023	14:00	Semifinals
Sunday, 1 October 2023	14:00	Final

== Results ==
Round of 16
Huang Chun-ta (TPE)	100
Khadbaataryn Dashzegve (MGL)	000
Rattanan Kaunsatan (THA)	110
Ghady Moussa (LBN)	001
Navruz Karimzod (TJK)	000
Bekadil Shaimerdenov (KAZ)	100
Umid Esanov (UZB)	111
Lê Đức Đông (VIE)	000
Aditya Dhopaokar (IND)	001
Hassan Baiqara Rasooli (AFG)	100

Quarterfinals
Rustam Turusbekov (KGZ)	000
Huang Chun-ta (TPE)	101
Rattanan Kaunsatan (THA)	000
Bekadil Shaimerdenov (KAZ)	101
Jackielou Escarpe (PHI)	000
Umid Esanov (UZB)	100
Hassan Baiqara Rasooli (AFG)	010
Eisa Al-Ali (KUW)	000

Semifinals
Huang Chun-ta (TPE)	011
Bekadil Shaimerdenov (KAZ)	100
Umid Esanov (UZB)	100
Hassan Baiqara Rasooli (AFG)	000

Final
Bekadil Shaimerdenov (KAZ)	000
Umid Esanov (UZB)	100
