= Tennis at the 2022 Asian Games – Mixed doubles =

Mixed doubles at the 2022 Asian Games
- Venue: Hangzhou Olympic Expo Tennis Center
- Dates: 24–30 September 2023
- Competitors: 66 from 19 nations

Medalists
gold medal	Rohan Bopanna; Rutuja Bhosale	India
silver medal	Huang Tsung-hao; Liang En-shuo	Chinese Taipei
bronze medal	Francis Alcantara; Alexandra Eala	Philippines
bronze medal	Hsu Yu-hsiou; Chan Hao-ching	Chinese Taipei

Mixed doubles
- Tennis at the 2022 Asian Games

Events
Singles	men	women
Doubles	men	women	mixed
Asian Games

The mixed doubles tennis event at the 2022 Asian Games took place at the Tennis Court of Hangzhou Olympic Expo Center, Hangzhou, China from 24 to 30 September 2023.

== Schedule ==
All times are China Standard Time (UTC+08:00)

Date	Time	Event
Sunday, 24 September 2023	12:00	Round 1
Monday, 25 September 2023	10:00	Round 2
Tuesday, 26 September 2023	10:00	Round 2
Wednesday, 27 September 2023	10:00	Round 3
Thursday, 28 September 2023	10:00	Quarterfinals
Friday, 29 September 2023	11:00	Semifinals
Saturday, 30 September 2023	10:00	Final

== Results ==
Legend

- WO — Won by walkover

=== Finals ===
Semifinals					Final
14	Francis Alcantara (PHI); Alexandra Eala (PHI)	5	3
9	Huang Tsung-hao (TPE); Liang En-shuo (TPE)	7	6		9	Huang Tsung-hao (TPE); Liang En-shuo (TPE)	6	3	[4]
3	Hsu Yu-hsiou (TPE); Chan Hao-ching (TPE)	1	6	[4]	2	Rohan Bopanna (IND); Rutuja Bhosale (IND)	2	6	[10]
2	Rohan Bopanna (IND); Rutuja Bhosale (IND)	6	3	[10]

=== Top half ===
==== Section 1 ====
Round 1
Aqeel Khan (PAK); Sarah Mahboob Khan (PAK)	6	6
Batbayaryn Khatansüikh (MGL); Gankhuyagiin Anand (MGL)	0	1

Round 2
1	Yuki Bhambri (IND); Ankita Raina (IND)	6	6
Aqeel Khan (PAK); Sarah Mahboob Khan (PAK)	0	0
Pranav Khanal (NEP); Sunira Thapa (NEP)	0	0
14	Francis Alcantara (PHI); Alexandra Eala (PHI)	6	6
11	Maximus Jones (THA); Luksika Kumkhum (THA)	6	6
Nguyễn Văn Phương (VIE); Savanna Lý-Nguyễn (VIE)	4	1
Mashari Nawaf (QAT); Khadija Gassama (QAT)	0	0
6	Kaito Uesugi (JPN); Momoko Kobori (JPN)	6	6

Round 3
1	Yuki Bhambri (IND); Ankita Raina (IND)	4	6	[8]
14	Francis Alcantara (PHI); Alexandra Eala (PHI)	6	4	[10]
11	Maximus Jones (THA); Luksika Kumkhum (THA)	6	2	[10]
6	Kaito Uesugi (JPN); Momoko Kobori (JPN)	2	6	[7]

Quarterfinals
14	Francis Alcantara (PHI); Alexandra Eala (PHI)	6	6
11	Maximus Jones (THA); Luksika Kumkhum (THA)	4	4

==== Section 2 ====
Round 1

Round 2
4	Chung Yun-seong (KOR); Han Na-lae (KOR)	6	6
Wong Hong Kit (HKG); Cody Wong (HKG)	2	1
Dmitry Popko (KAZ); Zhanel Rustemova (KAZ)	4	2
16	David Agung Susanto (INA); Jessy Rompies (INA)	6	6
9	Huang Tsung-hao (TPE); Liang En-shuo (TPE)	6	6
Ammar Al-Haqbani (KSA); Yara Al-Haqbani (KSA)	2	2
Amir Milushev (UZB); Shakhnoza Marimova (UZB)	0	0
7	Bu Yunchaokete (CHN); Zhu Lin (CHN)	6	6

Round 3
4	Chung Yun-seong (KOR); Han Na-lae (KOR)	6	6
16	David Agung Susanto (INA); Jessy Rompies (INA)	1	2
9	Huang Tsung-hao (TPE); Liang En-shuo (TPE)	6	6^{8}	[10]
7	Bu Yunchaokete (CHN); Zhu Lin (CHN)	3	7^{10}	[7]

Quarterfinals
4	Chung Yun-seong (KOR); Han Na-lae (KOR)	5	7	[4]
9	Huang Tsung-hao (TPE); Liang En-shuo (TPE)	7	5	[10]

=== Bottom half ===
==== Section 3 ====
Round 1

Round 2
5	Christopher Rungkat (INA); Aldila Sutjiadi (INA)	6	6
Abhishek Bastola (NEP); Abhilasha Bista (NEP)	0	0
Aisam-ul-Haq Qureshi (PAK); Ushna Suhail (PAK)	4	1
10	Pruchya Isaro (THA); Peangtarn Plipuech (THA)	6	6
15	Coleman Wong (HKG); Eudice Chong (HKG)	6	6
Kyle Tang (MAC); Jamie Lau (MAC)	3	0
Issa Al-Harrasi (QAT); Mubaraka Al-Naimi (QAT)	2	1
3	Hsu Yu-hsiou (TPE); Chan Hao-ching (TPE)	6	6

Round 3
5	Christopher Rungkat (INA); Aldila Sutjiadi (INA)	6	5	[10]
10	Pruchya Isaro (THA); Peangtarn Plipuech (THA)	2	7	[5]
15	Coleman Wong (HKG); Eudice Chong (HKG)	2	4
3	Hsu Yu-hsiou (TPE); Chan Hao-ching (TPE)	6	6

Quarterfinals
5	Christopher Rungkat (INA); Aldila Sutjiadi (INA)	4	5
3	Hsu Yu-hsiou (TPE); Chan Hao-ching (TPE)	6	7

==== Section 4 ====
Round 1

Round 2
8	Grigoriy Lomakin (KAZ); Zhibek Kulambayeva (KAZ)	7^{7}	7
Lee Jea-moon (KOR); Kim Da-bin (KOR)	6^{5}	5
Bakhtiyor Isroilov (TJK); Sumaya Tukhtaeva (TJK)	W	O
12	Zhang Zhizhen (CHN); Yang Zhaoxuan (CHN)
13	Shinji Hazawa (JPN); Ayano Shimizu (JPN)	6	2	[11]
Mönkhbaataryn Badrakh (MGL); Chogsomjavyn Maralgoo (MGL)	0	6	[9]
Maxim Shin (UZB); Akgul Amanmuradova (UZB)	2	4
2	Rohan Bopanna (IND); Rutuja Bhosale (IND)	6	6

Round 3
8	Grigoriy Lomakin (KAZ); Zhibek Kulambayeva (KAZ)	6	6
Bakhtiyor Isroilov (TJK); Sumaya Tukhtaeva (TJK)	0	1
13	Shinji Hazawa (JPN); Ayano Shimizu (JPN)	3	4
2	Rohan Bopanna (IND); Rutuja Bhosale (IND)	6	6

Quarterfinals
8	Grigoriy Lomakin (KAZ); Zhibek Kulambayeva (KAZ)	5	3
2	Rohan Bopanna (IND); Rutuja Bhosale (IND)	7	6
