= Tennis at the 2022 Asian Games =

- Venue: Hangzhou Olympic Expo Tennis Center
- Dates: 24–30 September 2023
- Competitors: 149 from 22 nations

Tennis at the 2022 Asian Games was held at the Tennis Court of Hangzhou Olympic Expo Center, Hangzhou, China from 24 to 30 September 2023.

Tennis had doubles and singles events for men and women, as well as a mixed doubles competition.

== Schedule ==
P	Preliminary rounds	¼	Quarterfinals	½	Semifinals	F	Final

Event↓/Date →	24th Sun	25th Mon	26th Tue	27th Wed	28th Thu	29th Fri	30th Sat
Men's singles	P	P	P	¼	½		F
Men's doubles	P	P	P	¼	½	F	
Women's singles	P	P	P	¼	½	F	
Women's doubles		P	P	¼	½		F
Mixed doubles	P	P	P	P	¼	½	F

== Medalists ==
Event	Gold	Silver	Bronze
Men's singles	Zhang Zhizhen; China	Yosuke Watanuki; Japan	Khumoyun Sultanov; Uzbekistan
Men's singles	Zhang Zhizhen; China	Yosuke Watanuki; Japan	Hong Seong-chan; South Korea
Men's doubles	Chinese Taipei; Hsu Yu-hsiou; Jason Jung	India; Saketh Myneni; Ramkumar Ramanathan	Thailand; Pruchya Isaro; Maximus Jones
Men's doubles	Chinese Taipei; Hsu Yu-hsiou; Jason Jung	India; Saketh Myneni; Ramkumar Ramanathan	South Korea; Hong Seong-chan; Kwon Soon-woo
Women's singles	Zheng Qinwen; China	Zhu Lin; China	Alexandra Eala; Philippines
Women's singles	Zheng Qinwen; China	Zhu Lin; China	Haruka Kaji; Japan
Women's doubles	Chinese Taipei; Chan Hao-ching; Latisha Chan	Chinese Taipei; Lee Ya-hsuan; Liang En-shuo	South Korea; Back Da-yeon; Jeong Bo-young
Women's doubles	Chinese Taipei; Chan Hao-ching; Latisha Chan	Chinese Taipei; Lee Ya-hsuan; Liang En-shuo	Indonesia; Aldila Sutjiadi; Janice Tjen
Mixed doubles	India; Rohan Bopanna; Rutuja Bhosale	Chinese Taipei; Huang Tsung-hao; Liang En-shuo	Philippines; Francis Alcantara; Alexandra Eala
Mixed doubles	India; Rohan Bopanna; Rutuja Bhosale	Chinese Taipei; Huang Tsung-hao; Liang En-shuo	Chinese Taipei; Hsu Yu-hsiou; Chan Hao-ching

== Medal table ==
Rank	Nation	Gold	Silver	Bronze	Total
1	Chinese Taipei (TPE)	2	2	1	5
2	China (CHN)	2	1	0	3
3	India (IND)	1	1	0	2
4	Japan (JPN)	0	1	1	2
5	South Korea (KOR)	0	0	3	3
6	Philippines (PHI)	0	0	2	2
7	Indonesia (INA)	0	0	1	1
7	Thailand (THA)	0	0	1	1
7	Uzbekistan (UZB)	0	0	1	1
Totals (9 entries)		5	5	10	20

== Participating nations ==
A total of 149 athletes from 22 nations competed in tennis at the 2022 Asian Games:

- China (8)
- Chinese Taipei (11)
- Hong Kong (6)
- India (9)
- Indonesia (10)
- Iran (2)
- Japan (8)
- Kazakhstan (8)
- Kuwait (3)
- Macau (6)
- Mongolia (11)
- Nepal (6)
- Pakistan (4)
- Philippines (3)
- Qatar (9)
- Saudi Arabia (2)
- South Korea (12)
- Tajikistan (5)
- Thailand (12)
- Timor-Leste (2)
- Uzbekistan (8)
- Vietnam (4)
