= Tennis at the 2022 Asian Games – Women's singles =

Women's singles at the 2022 Asian Games
- Venue: Hangzhou Olympic Expo Tennis Center
- Dates: 24–29 September 2023
- Competitors: 36 from 20 nations

Medalists
gold medal	Zheng Qinwen	China
silver medal	Zhu Lin	China
bronze medal	Alexandra Eala	Philippines
bronze medal	Haruka Kaji	Japan

Women's singles
- Tennis at the 2022 Asian Games

Events
Singles	men	women
Doubles	men	women	mixed
- Asian Games

The women's singles tennis event at the 2022 Asian Games took place at the Tennis Court of Hangzhou Olympic Expo Center, Hangzhou, China from 24 September to 29 September 2023.

Wang Qiang was the defending champion, but she did not participate at this edition.

== Schedule ==
All times are China Standard Time (UTC+08:00)

Date	Time	Event
Sunday, 24 September 2023	12:00	Round 1
Sunday, 24 September 2023	12:00	Round 2
Monday, 25 September 2023	10:00	Round 2
Monday, 25 September 2023	10:00	Round 3
Tuesday, 26 September 2023	10:00	Round 3
Wednesday, 27 September 2023	10:00	Quarterfinals
Thursday, 28 September 2023	10:00	Semifinals
Friday, 29 September 2023	10:00	Final

== Results ==
Legend

- r — Retired

=== Finals ===
Semifinals					Final
1	Zheng Qinwen (CHN)	6	6^{5}	6
4	Alexandra Eala (PHI)	1	7^{7}	3	1	Zheng Qinwen (CHN)	6	6
6	Haruka Kaji (JPN)	6	0	1	2	Zhu Lin (CHN)	2	4
2	Zhu Lin (CHN)	4	6	6

=== Top half ===
==== Section 1 ====
Round 1
Yara Al-Haqbani (KSA)	0	1
Chogsomjavyn Maralgoo (MGL)	6	6

Round 2
1	Zheng Qinwen (CHN)	6	6
Chogsomjavyn Maralgoo (MGL)	0	0
Sevil Yuldasheva (UZB)	3	3
15	Lee Ya-hsuan (TPE)	6	6
10	Park So-hyun (KOR)	6	6
Mahika Rana (NEP)	0	1
Beatrice Gumulya (INA)	2	0
7	Eudice Chong (HKG)	6	6

Round 3
1	Zheng Qinwen (CHN)	6	6
15	Lee Ya-hsuan (TPE)	0	2
10	Park So-hyun (KOR)	6	6
7	Eudice Chong (HKG)	3	3

Quarterfinals
1	Zheng Qinwen (CHN)	7^{7}	6
10	Park So-hyun (KOR)	6^{4}	0

==== Section 2 ====
Round 1
Sarah Mahboob Khan (PAK)	6	6^{5}	6
Hind Al-Mudahka (QAT)	2	7^{7}	3

Round 2
4	Alexandra Eala (PHI)	6	6
Sarah Mahboob Khan (PAK)	0	0
Aruzhan Sagandykova (KAZ)	6^{2}	2
13	Rutuja Bhosale (IND)	7^{7}	6
11	Kyoka Okamura (JPN)	6	3	6
Savanna Lý-Nguyễn (VIE)	2	6	4
Jamie Lau (MAC)	2	0
8	Lanlana Tararudee (THA)	6	6

Round 3
4	Alexandra Eala (PHI)	7^{7}	6
13	Rutuja Bhosale (IND)	6^{5}	2
11	Kyoka Okamura (JPN)	4	6	6
8	Lanlana Tararudee (THA)	6	4	4

Quarterfinals
4	Alexandra Eala (PHI)	0	7	6
11	Kyoka Okamura (JPN)	6	5	0

=== Bottom half ===
==== Section 3 ====
Round 1
Sabrina Olimjonova (UZB)	6	6
Sophia Huỳnh (VIE)	0	0

Round 2
6	Haruka Kaji (JPN)	6	6
Mubaraka Al-Naimi (QAT)	0	0
Meshkatolzahra Safi (IRI)	0	0^{r}
12	Joanna Garland (TPE)	6	4
14	Adithya Karunaratne (HKG)	6	6
Iu Si Nong (MAC)	0	0
Sabrina Olimjonova (UZB)	0	0
3	Ankita Raina (IND)	6	6

Round 3
6	Haruka Kaji (JPN)	6	6
12	Joanna Garland (TPE)	1	3
14	Adithya Karunaratne (HKG)	1	2
3	Ankita Raina (IND)	6	6

Quarterfinals
6	Haruka Kaji (JPN)	3	6	6
3	Ankita Raina (IND)	6	4	4

==== Section 4 ====
Round 1
Ushna Suhail (PAK)	6	6
Sumaya Tukhtaeva (TJK)	2	3

Round 2
5	Han Na-lae (KOR)	6	6
Chogsomjavyn Martaa (MGL)	1	3
Abhilasha Bista (NEP)	0	0
9	Mananchaya Sawangkaew (THA)	6	6
16	Gozal Ainitdinova (KAZ)	1	2
Janice Tjen (INA)	6	6
Ushna Suhail (PAK)	0	0
2	Zhu Lin (CHN)	6	6

Round 3
5	Han Na-lae (KOR)	1	6	7
9	Mananchaya Sawangkaew (THA)	6	2	5
Janice Tjen (INA)	3	0
2	Zhu Lin (CHN)	6	6

Quarterfinals
5	Han Na-lae (KOR)	6^{3}	3
2	Zhu Lin (CHN)	7^{7}	6
