= Tennis at the 2022 Asian Games – Men's doubles =

Men's doubles at the 2022 Asian Games
- Venue: Hangzhou Olympic Expo Tennis Center
- Dates: 24–29 September 2023
- Competitors: 62 from 20 nations

Medalists
gold medal	Hsu Yu-hsiou; Jason Jung	Chinese Taipei
silver medal	Saketh Myneni; Ramkumar Ramanathan	India
bronze medal	Pruchya Isaro; Maximus Jones	Thailand
bronze medal	Hong Seong-chan; Kwon Soon-woo	South Korea

Men's doubles
- Tennis at the 2022 Asian Games

Events
Singles	men	women
Doubles	men	women	mixed
- Asian Games

The men's doubles tennis event at the 2022 Asian Games took place at the Tennis Court of Hangzhou Olympic Expo Center, Hangzhou, China from 24 to 29 September 2023.

== Schedule ==
All times are China Standard Time (UTC+08:00)

Date	Time	Event
Sunday, 24 September 2023	12:00	Round 1
Monday, 25 September 2023	10:00	Round 1
Monday, 25 September 2023	10:00	Round 2
Tuesday, 26 September 2023	10:00	Round 2
Wednesday, 27 September 2023	10:00	Quarterfinals
Thursday, 28 September 2023	10:00	Semifinals
Friday, 29 September 2023	10:00	Final

== Results ==
=== Final ===
Final
	Hsu Yu-hsiou (TPE); Jason Jung (TPE)	6	6
2	Saketh Myneni (IND); Ramkumar Ramanathan (IND)	4	4

=== Top half ===
Round 1
Bader Al-Qahtani (KUW); Abdulhamid Mubarak (KUW)	3	1
Sergey Fomin (UZB); Khumoyun Sultanov (UZB)	6	6
Agapito Ferreira (TLS); António Mendes (TLS)	1	0
Aqeel Khan (PAK); Aisam-ul-Haq Qureshi (PAK)	6	6
Hsu Yu-hsiou (TPE); Jason Jung (TPE)	2	6	[10]
8	Te Rigele (CHN); Bu Yunchaokete (CHN)	6	3	[7]
3	Nam Ji-sung (KOR); Song Min-kyu (KOR)	6	7
Lý Hoàng Nam (VIE); Nguyễn Văn Phương (VIE)	4	5
Grigoriy Lomakin (KAZ); Dmitry Popko (KAZ)	7^{7}	6
Issa Al-Harrasi (QAT); Rashed Nawaf (QAT)	6^{2}	2
Pruchya Isaro (THA); Maximus Jones (THA)	6	6
Baataryn Oyuunbat (MGL); Sükhbaataryn Sükhjargal (MGL)	0	1
Sunatullo Isroilov (TJK); Firuz Mukhidinov (TJK)	0	0
7	Nathan Barki (INA); Christopher Rungkat (INA)	6	6

Round 2
1	Yuki Bhambri (IND); Rohan Bopanna (IND)	6	3	[6]
Sergey Fomin (UZB); Khumoyun Sultanov (UZB)	2	6	[10]
Aqeel Khan (PAK); Aisam-ul-Haq Qureshi (PAK)	6^{3}	4
Hsu Yu-hsiou (TPE); Jason Jung (TPE)	7^{7}	6
3	Nam Ji-sung (KOR); Song Min-kyu (KOR)	6	5	[10]
Grigoriy Lomakin (KAZ); Dmitry Popko (KAZ)	3	7	[7]
Pruchya Isaro (THA); Maximus Jones (THA)	6	4	[10]
7	Nathan Barki (INA); Christopher Rungkat (INA)	3	6	[7]

Quarterfinals
Sergey Fomin (UZB); Khumoyun Sultanov (UZB)	2	3
Hsu Yu-hsiou (TPE); Jason Jung (TPE)	6	6
3	Nam Ji-sung (KOR); Song Min-kyu (KOR)	4	6	[7]
Pruchya Isaro (THA); Maximus Jones (THA)	6	3	[10]

Semifinals
Hsu Yu-hsiou (TPE); Jason Jung (TPE)	4	7^{7}	[10]
Pruchya Isaro (THA); Maximus Jones (THA)	6	6^{5}	[2]

=== Bottom half ===
Round 1
5	Shinji Hazawa (JPN); Kaito Uesugi (JPN)	6	6
Baataryn Oyuunbold (MGL); Puntsagiin Sükhbaatar (MGL)	0	0
Bakhtiyor Isroilov (TJK); Sobir Saidov (TJK)	0	0
Denis Yevseyev (KAZ); Beibit Zhukayev (KAZ)	6	6
Hong Seong-chan (KOR); Kwon Soon-woo (KOR)	6	6
Coleman Wong (HKG); Wong Hong Kit (HKG)	2	2
Thantub Suksumrarn (THA); Wishaya Trongcharoenchaikul (THA)	4	6	[10]
4	Francis Alcantara (PHI); Ruben Gonzales (PHI)	6	4	[5]
6	Ray Ho (TPE); Wu Tung-lin (TPE)	3	0
Wu Yibing (CHN); Zhang Zhizhen (CHN)	6	6
Mubarak Al-Harrasi (QAT); Mashari Nawaf (QAT)	6	6
Lam Chin Lok (MAC); Marco Leung (MAC)	3	1
Amir Milushev (UZB); Maxim Shin (UZB)	2	5
Anthony Susanto (INA); David Agung Susanto (INA)	6	7
Abhishek Bastola (NEP); Pradip Khadka (NEP)	2	3
2	Saketh Myneni (IND); Ramkumar Ramanathan (IND)	6	6

Round 2
5	Shinji Hazawa (JPN); Kaito Uesugi (JPN)	7	7
Denis Yevseyev (KAZ); Beibit Zhukayev (KAZ)	5	5
Hong Seong-chan (KOR); Kwon Soon-woo (KOR)	6	6
Thantub Suksumrarn (THA); Wishaya Trongcharoenchaikul (THA)	3	3
Wu Yibing (CHN); Zhang Zhizhen (CHN)	6	6
Mubarak Al-Harrasi (QAT); Mashari Nawaf (QAT)	3	4
Anthony Susanto (INA); David Agung Susanto (INA)	3	2
2	Saketh Myneni (IND); Ramkumar Ramanathan (IND)	6	6

Quarterfinals
5	Shinji Hazawa (JPN); Kaito Uesugi (JPN)	2	4
Hong Seong-chan (KOR); Kwon Soon-woo (KOR)	6	6
Wu Yibing (CHN); Zhang Zhizhen (CHN)	1	6^{8}
2	Saketh Myneni (IND); Ramkumar Ramanathan (IND)	6	7^{10}

Semifinals
Hong Seong-chan (KOR); Kwon Soon-woo (KOR)	1	7^{8}	[0]
2	Saketh Myneni (IND); Ramkumar Ramanathan (IND)	6	6^{6}	[10]
