= Tennis at the 2022 Asian Games – Women's doubles =

Women's doubles at the 2022 Asian Games
- Venue: Hangzhou Olympic Expo Tennis Center
- Dates: 25–30 September 2023
- Competitors: 52 from 15 nations

Medalists
gold medal	Chan Hao-ching; Latisha Chan	Chinese Taipei
silver medal	Lee Ya-hsuan; Liang En-shuo	Chinese Taipei
bronze medal	Back Da-yeon; Jeong Bo-young	South Korea
bronze medal	Aldila Sutjiadi; Janice Tjen	Indonesia

Women's doubles
- Tennis at the 2022 Asian Games

Events
Singles	men	women
Doubles	men	women	mixed
Asian Games

The women's doubles tennis event at the 2022 Asian Games took place at the Tennis Court of Hangzhou Olympic Expo Center, Hangzhou, China from 25 to 30 September 2023.

== Schedule ==
All times are China Standard Time (UTC+08:00)

Date	Time	Event
Monday, 25 September 2023	10:00	Round 1
Tuesday, 26 September 2023	10:00	Round 2
Wednesday, 27 September 2023	11:00	Quarterfinals
Thursday, 28 September 2023	11:00	Semifinals
Saturday, 30 September 2023	10:00	Final

== Results ==
Legend

- r — Retired

=== Final ===
Final
8	Lee Ya-hsuan (TPE); Liang En-shuo (TPE)	4	3
2	Chan Hao-ching (TPE); Latisha Chan (TPE)	6	6

=== Top half ===
Round 1
Abhilasha Bista (NEP); Mahika Rana (NEP)	1	0
Back Da-yeon (KOR); Jeong Bo-young (KOR)	6	6
Enkhjargalyn Sonomyanzum (MGL); Ganbaataryn Yesügen (MGL)	1	1
Sarah Mahboob Khan (PAK); Ushna Suhail (PAK)	6	6
Anchisa Chanta (THA); Punnin Kovapitukted (THA)	6	6
Adithya Karunaratne (HKG); Wu Ho Ching (HKG)	4	0
Gozal Ainitdinova (KAZ); Zhibek Kulambayeva (KAZ)	6	6
Safiya Al-Thani (QAT); Shaikha Khalifa (QAT)	0	0
Shakhnoza Marimova (UZB); Sabrina Olimjonova (UZB)	3	5
8	Lee Ya-hsuan (TPE); Liang En-shuo (TPE)	6	7

Round 2
1	Wang Xinyu (CHN); Yang Zhaoxuan (CHN)	5^{r}
Back Da-yeon (KOR); Jeong Bo-young (KOR)	3
Sarah Mahboob Khan (PAK); Ushna Suhail (PAK)	0	0
6	Beatrice Gumulya (INA); Jessy Rompies (INA)	6	6
3	Ankita Raina (IND); Prarthana Thombare (IND)	5	2
Anchisa Chanta (THA); Punnin Kovapitukted (THA)	7	6
Gozal Ainitdinova (KAZ); Zhibek Kulambayeva (KAZ)	6^{5}	4
8	Lee Ya-hsuan (TPE); Liang En-shuo (TPE)	7^{7}	6

Quarterfinals
Back Da-yeon (KOR); Jeong Bo-young (KOR)	4	7^{7}	[10]
6	Beatrice Gumulya (INA); Jessy Rompies (INA)	6	6^{4}	[4]
Anchisa Chanta (THA); Punnin Kovapitukted (THA)	6^{3}	3
8	Lee Ya-hsuan (TPE); Liang En-shuo (TPE)	7^{7}	6

Semifinals
Back Da-yeon (KOR); Jeong Bo-young (KOR)	2	6	[9]
8	Lee Ya-hsuan (TPE); Liang En-shuo (TPE)	6	4	[11]

=== Bottom half ===
Round 1
7	Momoko Kobori (JPN); Ayano Shimizu (JPN)	7^{7}	6
Zheng Qinwen (CHN); Zhu Lin (CHN)	6^{5}	3
Iu Si Nong (MAC); Leong Weng Si (MAC)	0	0
Ku Yeon-woo (KOR); Park So-hyun (KOR)	6	6
Aldila Sutjiadi (INA); Janice Tjen (INA)	6	6
Akgul Amanmuradova (UZB); Sevil Yuldasheva (UZB)	2	4
Rutuja Bhosale (IND); Karman Thandi (IND)	6	6
Zhanel Rustemova (KAZ); Aruzhan Sagandykova (KAZ)	4	2
Mubaraka Al-Naimi (QAT); Khadija Gassama (QAT)	0	0
Chogsomjavyn Maralgoo (MGL); Chogsomjavyn Martaa (MGL)	6	6

Round 2
7	Momoko Kobori (JPN); Ayano Shimizu (JPN)	4	4
Ku Yeon-woo (KOR); Park So-hyun (KOR)	6	6
Aldila Sutjiadi (INA); Janice Tjen (INA)	7^{7}	6
4	Luksika Kumkhum (THA); Peangtarn Plipuech (THA)	6^{4}	3
5	Eudice Chong (HKG); Cody Wong (HKG)	6	6
Rutuja Bhosale (IND); Karman Thandi (IND)	4	1
Chogsomjavyn Maralgoo (MGL); Chogsomjavyn Martaa (MGL)	0	3
2	Chan Hao-ching (TPE); Latisha Chan (TPE)	6	6

Quarterfinals
Ku Yeon-woo (KOR); Park So-hyun (KOR)	2	4
Aldila Sutjiadi (INA); Janice Tjen (INA)	6	6
5	Eudice Chong (HKG); Cody Wong (HKG)	3	4
2	Chan Hao-ching (TPE); Latisha Chan (TPE)	6	6

Semifinals
Aldila Sutjiadi (INA); Janice Tjen (INA)	2	2
2	Chan Hao-ching (TPE); Latisha Chan (TPE)	6	6
