= Judo at the 2022 Asian Games – Women's 63 kg =

Judo competition

Judo Women's 63 kg at the 2022 Asian Games
- Venue: Xiaoshan Linpu Gymnasium
- Location: Hangzhou, China
- Dates: 25 September 2023
- Nations: 15

Medalists
gold medal	Miku Takaichi	Japan
silver medal	Tang Jing	China
bronze medal	Esmigul Kuyulova	Kazakhstan
bronze medal	Kim Ji-jeong	South Korea

Competition at external databases
- Links: IJF • JudoInside

The women's 63 kilograms (half lightweight) competition in Judo at the 2022 Asian Games in Hangzhou was held on 25 September 2023 at the Xiaoshan Linpu Gymnasium.

== Schedule ==
All times are China Standard Time (UTC+08:00)

Date	Time	Event
Monday, 25 September 2023	10:00	Elimination round of 16
Monday, 25 September 2023	10:00	Quarterfinals
Monday, 25 September 2023	10:00	Repechage
Monday, 25 September 2023	10:00	Semifinals
Monday, 25 September 2023	16:00	Finals

== Results ==
=== Main bracket ===
Round of 16
Kiyomi Watanabe (PHI)	11 (yellow card)
Nguyễn Ngọc Diễm Phương (VIE)	01
Esmigul Kuyulova (KAZ)	10
Mönkhtsedeviin Ichinkhorloo (MGL)	00
Kim Ji-jeong (KOR)	10
Aquilina Chayeb (LBN)	00
Tang Jing (CHN)	10
Tang Lai Man (MAC)	00
Syerina (INA)	00 (yellow card)
Mavluda Odinaeva (TJK)	01
Zülhumar Daşkinowa (TKM)	00
Adina Kochkonbaeva (KGZ)	10 (yellow card)
Sevinch Isokova (UZB)	w/o
Leung Po Sum (HKG)

Quarter-finals
Miku Takaichi (JPN)	10
Kiyomi Watanabe (PHI)	00
Esmigul Kuyulova (KAZ)	00
Kim Ji-jeong (KOR)	01 (yellow card)
Tang Jing (CHN)	10
Mavluda Odinaeva (TJK)	00
Adina Kochkonbaeva (KGZ)	00 (yellow card)
Sevinch Isokova (UZB)	11 (yellow card)

Semi-finals
Miku Takaichi (JPN)	10
Kim Ji-jeong (KOR)	01 (yellow card)
Tang Jing (CHN)	10
Sevinch Isokova (UZB)	00

Gold medal contest
Miku Takaichi (JPN)	10 (yellow card)
Tang Jing (CHN)	00

=== Repechage ===
Repechage
Kiyomi Watanabe (PHI)	00
Esmigul Kuyulova (KAZ)	10
Mavluda Odinaeva (TJK)	00
Adina Kochkonbaeva (KGZ)	11

Bronze medal contests
Esmigul Kuyulova (KAZ)	10 (yellow card)
Sevinch Isokova (UZB)	01
Adina Kochkonbaeva (KGZ)	00 (yellow card)
Kim Ji-jeong (KOR)	10 (yellow card)
