= Taekwondo at the 2022 Asian Games – Women's +67 kg =

Taekwondo competition

Women's +67 kg at the 2022 Asian Games
- Venue: Lin'an Sports and Culture Centre
- Date: 28 September 2023
- Competitors: 11 from 11 nations

Medalists
gold medal	Zhou Zeqi	China
silver medal	Lee Da-bin	South Korea
bronze medal	Svetlana Osipova	Uzbekistan
bronze medal	Cansel Deniz	Kazakhstan

The women's +67 kilograms event at the 2022 Asian Games took place on 28 September 2023 at Lin'an Sports and Culture Centre, Hangzhou, China.

Zhou Zeqi from China won the gold medal after beating the defending champion Lee Da-bin in the gold medal contest.

== Schedule ==
All times are China Standard Time (UTC+08:00)

Date	Time	Event
Thursday, 28 September 2023	09:00	Round of 16
Thursday, 28 September 2023	09:00	Quarterfinals
Thursday, 28 September 2023	14:00	Semifinals
Thursday, 28 September 2023	14:00	Gold medal contest

== Results ==
Legend

- DQ — Won by disqualification

Round of 16
Anahita Tavakkoli (IRI)	9	7
Kirstie Alora (PHI)	2	2
Maram Fatnassi (QAT)
Ward Selman (LBN)	D	Q
Pan Yun-ci (TPE)	10	5
Munira Abdusalomova (TJK)	1	0

Quarterfinals
Svetlana Osipova (UZB)	10	0	1
Anahita Tavakkoli (IRI)	2	1	0
Rama Abu Al-Rub (JOR)	0	2
Zhou Zeqi (CHN)	5	6
Cansel Deniz (KAZ)	6	7
Ward Selman (LBN)	3	0
Pan Yun-ci (TPE)	5	5
Lee Da-bin (KOR)	9	6

Semifinals
Svetlana Osipova (UZB)	3	3	0
Zhou Zeqi (CHN)	2	7	0
Cansel Deniz (KAZ)	2	13	3
Lee Da-bin (KOR)	13	13	16

Gold medal contest
Zhou Zeqi (CHN)	8	9	21
Lee Da-bin (KOR)	9	2	8
