= Rowing at the 2022 Asian Games – Women's single sculls =

Women's single sculls at the 2022 Asian Games
- Venue: Fuyang Water Sports Centre
- Date: 20–25 September 2023
- Competitors: 13 from 13 nations

Medalists
gold medal	Anna Prakaten	Uzbekistan
silver medal	Liu Ruiqi	China
bronze medal	Shiho Yonekawa	Japan

The women's single sculls competition at the 2022 Asian Games in Hangzhou, China was held on 20, 21, 22 & 25 September 2023 at the Fuyang Water Sports Centre. The gold medal was won by Uzbek rower, Anna Prakaten.

== Schedule ==
All times are China Standard Time (UTC+08:00)

Date	Time	Event
Wednesday, 20 September 2023	15:00	Heats
Thursday, 21 September 2023	15:00	Repechage
Friday, 22 September 2023	15:00	Semifinals
Monday, 25 September 2023	09:00	Finals

== Results ==
=== Heats ===
- Qualification: 1–3 → Semifinals A/B (SA/B), 4–5 → Repechage (R)

==== Heat 1 ====
Rank	Athlete	Time	Notes
1	Anna Prakaten (UZB)	7:42.24	SA/B
2	Joanie Delgaco (PHI)	8:07.60	SA/B
3	Leung Wing Wun (HKG)	8:13.88	SA/B
4	Chae Se-hyeon (KOR)	8:25.59	R
5	Maryam Isa (BRN)	11:30.96	R

==== Heat 2 ====
Rank	Athlete	Time	Notes
1	Shiho Yonekawa (JPN)	8:01.37	SA/B
2	Huang Yi-ting (TPE)	8:08.15	SA/B
3	Natticha Kaewhom (THA)	8:21.08	SA/B
4	Hồ Thị Duy (VIE)	8:27.36	R

==== Heat 3 ====
Rank	Athlete	Time	Notes
1	Liu Ruiqi (CHN)	8:00.74	SA/B
2	Soaad Al-Faqaan (KUW)	8:45.30	SA/B
3	Maheshi Liyanage (SRI)	8:53.68	SA/B
4	Haya Al-Mamy (KSA)	9:18.16	R

=== Repechage ===
- Qualification: 1–3 → Semifinals A/B (SA/B)

Rank	Athlete	Time	Notes
1	Hồ Thị Duy (VIE)	8:34.52	SA/B
2	Chae Se-hyeon (KOR)	8:39.40	SA/B
3	Haya Al-Mamy (KSA)	9:24.60	SA/B
4	Maryam Isa (BRN)	11:48.17	

=== Semifinals ===
- Qualification: 1–3 → Final A (FA), 4–6 → Final B (FB)

==== Semifinal A/B 1 ====
Rank	Athlete	Time	Notes
1	Anna Prakaten (UZB)	7:47.88	FA
2	Liu Ruiqi (CHN)	7:55.69	FA
3	Huang Yi-ting (TPE)	8:14.36	FA
4	Chae Se-hyeon (KOR)	8:29.53	FB
5	Maheshi Liyanage (SRI)	8:57.65	FB
6	Haya Al-Mamy (KSA)	9:00.36	FB

==== Semifinal A/B 2 ====
Rank	Athlete	Time	Notes
1	Shiho Yonekawa (JPN)	8:06.32	FA
2	Joanie Delgaco (PHI)	8:18.30	FA
3	Leung Wing Wun (HKG)	8:20.35	FA
4	Hồ Thị Duy (VIE)	8:23.56	FB
5	Natticha Kaewhom (THA)	8:33.00	FB
6	Soaad Al-Faqaan (KUW)	8:58.50	FB

=== Finals ===
==== Final B ====
Rank	Athlete	Time
1	Chae Se-hyeon (KOR)	8:06.75
2	Hồ Thị Duy (VIE)	8:07.48
3	Natticha Kaewhom (THA)	8:14.79
4	Soaad Al-Faqaan (KUW)	8:20.47
5	Maheshi Liyanage (SRI)	8:36.99
6	Haya Al-Mamy (KSA)	8:40.84

==== Final A ====
Rank	Athlete	Time
1st place, gold medalist(s)	Anna Prakaten (UZB)	7:39.05
2nd place, silver medalist(s)	Liu Ruiqi (CHN)	7:49.98
3rd place, bronze medalist(s)	Shiho Yonekawa (JPN)	7:51.88
4	Huang Yi-ting (TPE)	7:56.76
5	Joanie Delgaco (PHI)	8:05.93
6	Leung Wing Wun (HKG)	8:10.72
