= Canoeing at the 2022 Asian Games – Men's C-1 1000 metres =

Men's C-1 1000 metres at the 2022 Asian Games
- Venue: Fuyang Water Sports Centre
- Date: 30 September – 2 October 2023
- Competitors: 10 from 10 nations

Medalists
gold medal	Lai Kuan-chieh	Chinese Taipei
silver medal	Vladlen Denisov	Uzbekistan
bronze medal	Timofey Yemelyanov	Kazakhstan

The men's sprint C-1 (canoe single) 1000 metres competition at the 2022 Asian Games was held on 30 September and 2 October 2023.

== Schedule ==
All times are China Standard Time (UTC+08:00)

Date	Time	Event
Saturday, 30 September 2023	09:50	Heats
Saturday, 30 September 2023	15:15	Semifinal
Monday, 2 October 2023	10:10	Final

== Results ==
=== Heats ===
- Qualification: 1–3 → Final (QF), Rest → Semifinal (QS)

==== Heat 1 ====
Rank	Athlete	Time	Notes
1	Lai Kuan-chieh (TPE)	4:02.431	QF
2	Mohammad Nabi Rezaei (IRI)	4:02.463	QF
3	Shahriyor Daminov (TJK)	4:07.271	QF
4	Timofey Yemelyanov (KAZ)	4:10.107	QS
5	Rudiansyah (INA)	4:24.798	QS
6	Niraj Verma (IND)	4:25.162	QS

==== Heat 2 ====
Rank	Athlete	Time	Notes
1	Ji Bowen (CHN)	4:12.524	QF
2	Kim Yi-yeol (KOR)	4:42.382	QF
3	Vladlen Denisov (UZB)	4:43.784	QF
4	Kritsana Chuangchan (THA)	4:48.127	QS

=== Semifinal ===
- Qualification: 1–3 → Final (QF)

Rank	Athlete	Time	Notes
1	Niraj Verma (IND)	4:31.626	QF
2	Timofey Yemelyanov (KAZ)	4:32.132	QF
3	Rudiansyah (INA)	4:51.652	QF
4	Kritsana Chuangchan (THA)	5:00.202	

=== Final ===
Rank	Athlete	Time
1st place, gold medalist(s)	Lai Kuan-chieh (TPE)	4:15.942
2nd place, silver medalist(s)	Vladlen Denisov (UZB)	4:15.994
3rd place, bronze medalist(s)	Timofey Yemelyanov (KAZ)	4:18.810
4	Mohammad Nabi Rezaei (IRI)	4:19.328
5	Ji Bowen (CHN)	4:21.491
6	Shahriyor Daminov (TJK)	4:28.419
7	Niraj Verma (IND)	4:36.314
8	Rudiansyah (INA)	4:58.328
9	Kim Yi-yeol (KOR)	5:12.471
