= Wushu at the 2022 Asian Games – Women's changquan =

Women's changquan at the 2022 Asian Games
- Venue: Xiaoshan Guali Sports Centre
- Dates: 25 September 2023
- Competitors: 11 from 9 nations

Medalists
gold medal	Li Yi	Macau
silver medal	Liu Xuxu	Hong Kong
bronze medal	Kimberly Ong	Singapore

The women's changquan competition at the 2022 Asian Games was held on 25 September 2023 at Xiaoshan Guali Sports Centre in Hangzhou, China.

== Schedule ==
All times are China Standard Time (UTC+08:00)

Date	Time	Event
Monday, 25 September 2023	09:00	Final

== Results ==
Legend

- DNS — Did not start

Rank	Athlete	Score
1st place, gold medalist(s)	Li Yi (MAC)	9.786
2nd place, silver medalist(s)	Liu Xuxu (HKG)	9.756
3rd place, bronze medalist(s)	Kimberly Ong (SGP)	9.756
4	Zoe Tan (SGP)	9.753
5	Sou Cho Man (MAC)	9.753
6	Eugenia Diva Widodo (INA)	9.650
7	Nguyễn Thị Hiền (VIE)	9.446
8	Sushmita Tamang (NEP)	9.410
9	Kana Ikeuchi (JPN)	8.990
10	Naphalai Saeyang (THA)	8.150
—	Nyeman Wangsu (IND)	DNS
