= Judo at the 2022 Asian Games – Men's 100 kg =

Judo competition

Judo Men's 100 kg at the 2022 Asian Games
- Venue: Xiaoshan Linpu Gymnasium
- Location: Hangzhou, China
- Date: 26 September 2023

Medalists
gold medal	Muzaffarbek Turoboyev; Uzbekistan
silver medal	Batkhuyagiin Gonchigsüren; Mongolia
bronze medal	Dzhafar Kostoev; United Arab Emirates
bronze medal	Nurlykhan Sharkhan; Kazakhstan

Competition at external databases
- Links: IJF • JudoInside

The men's 100 kilograms (half heavyweight) competition in Judo at the 2022 Asian Games in Hangzhou was held on 26 September 2023 at the Xiaoshan Linpu Gymnasium.

In the final, Muzaffarbek Turoboyev from Uzbekistan won the gold medal.

== Schedule ==
All times are China Standard Time (UTC+08:00)

Date	Time	Event
Tuesday, 26 September 2023	10:00	Elimination round of 16
Tuesday, 26 September 2023	10:00	Quarterfinals
Tuesday, 26 September 2023	10:00	Repechage
Tuesday, 26 September 2023	10:00	Semifinals
Tuesday, 26 September 2023	16:00	Finals

== Results ==
=== Main bracket ===
Round of 16
Baýmyrat Majanow (TKM)	10
Isroil Rakhimov (TJK)	01
Nurlykhan Sharkhan (KAZ)	10
Zelimkhan Bashaev (BHR)	00
Aaron Wolf (JPN)	11
Vladimir Zoloev (KGZ)	00
Won Jong-hoon (KOR)	10
Carl Dave Aseneta (PHI)	00
Dzhafar Kostoev (UAE)	01 (yellow card)
Nacif Elias (LBN)	00 (yellow card)
Avtar Singh (IND)	01
Kittipong Hantratin (THA)	00

Quarter-finals
Muzaffarbek Turoboyev (UZB)	11 (yellow card)
Baýmyrat Majanow (TKM)	00 (yellow card)
Nurlykhan Sharkhan (KAZ)	10 (yellow card)
Aaron Wolf (JPN)	00
Batkhuyagiin Gonchigsüren (MGL)	10
Won Jong-hoon (KOR)	00
Dzhafar Kostoev (UAE)	w/o
Avtar Singh (IND)

Semi-finals
Muzaffarbek Turoboyev (UZB)	11
Nurlykhan Sharkhan (KAZ)	00
Batkhuyagiin Gonchigsüren (MGL)	10
Dzhafar Kostoev (UAE)	00 (yellow card)

Gold medal contest
Muzaffarbek Turoboyev (UZB)	10
Batkhuyagiin Gonchigsüren (MGL)	01

=== Repechage ===
Repechage
Baýmyrat Madjanow (TKM)	00
Aaron Wolf (JPN)	10
Won Jong-hoon (KOR)	w/o
Avtar Singh (IND)

Bronze medal contests
Aaron Wolf (JPN)	00 (yellow card)
Dzhafar Kostoev (UAE)	01
Won Jong-hoon (KOR)	00 (yellow card)
Nurlykhan Sharkhan (KAZ)	10
