= Wushu at the 2022 Asian Games – Men's nanquan & nangun =

Men's nanquan & nangun at the 2022 Asian Games
- Venue: Xiaoshan Guali Sports Centre
- Dates: 26 September 2023
- Competitors: 20 from 13 nations

Medalists
gold medal	Harris Horatius	Indonesia
silver medal	Lee Yong-mun	South Korea
bronze medal	Huang Junhua	Macau

The men's nanquan and nangun competition at the 2022 Asian Games was held on 26 September 2023 at Xiaoshan Guali Sports Centre in Hangzhou, China.

== Schedule ==
All times are China Standard Time (UTC+08:00)

Date	Time	Event
Tuesday, 26 September 2023	09:00	Nanquan
Tuesday, 26 September 2023	14:30	Nangun

== Results ==
Rank	Athlete	Nanquan	Nangun	Total
1st place, gold medalist(s)	Harris Horatius (INA)	9.756	9.750	19.506
2nd place, silver medalist(s)	Lee Yong-mun (KOR)	9.736	9.736	19.472
3rd place, bronze medalist(s)	Huang Junhua (MAC)	9.723	9.740	19.463
4	Mohammad Adi Salihin (BRU)	9.713	9.716	19.429
5	Lai Po-wei (TPE)	9.713	9.716	19.429
6	Liu Chang-min (TPE)	9.713	9.713	19.426
7	Yun Dong-hae (KOR)	9.703	9.706	19.409
8	Calvin Lee (MAS)	9.693	9.710	19.403
9	Mohammad Ali Mojiri (IRI)	9.690	9.690	19.380
10	Shahin Banitalebi (IRI)	9.693	9.686	19.379
11	Lau Chi Lung (HKG)	9.730	9.616	19.346
12	Pitaya Yangrungrawin (THA)	9.660	9.556	19.216
13	Deepak Hamal (NEP)	9.633	9.546	19.179
14	Majdurano Joel (BRU)	9.463	9.680	19.143
15	Đỗ Đức Tài (VIE)	9.320	9.483	18.803
16	Thornton Sayan (PHI)	8.913	9.670	18.583
17	Nông Văn Hữu (VIE)	9.083	9.180	18.263
18	Chan Chi Ngou (MAC)	8.570	9.470	18.040
19	Wanchai Yodyinghathaikun (THA)	9.113	8.396	17.509
20	Ilyoskhon Valiev (TJK)	7.346	7.366	14.712
