= Saudi Arabia at the 2022 Asian Games =

- IOC code: KSA
- NOC: Saudi Arabian Olympic Committee

in Hangzhou 19 September 2023 – 8 October 2023
- Competitors: 188 in 19 sports
- Medals Ranked 19th: Gold 4 Silver 2 Bronze 4 Total 10

Asian Games appearances (overview)
- 1978; 1982; 1986; 1990; 1994; 1998; 2002; 2006; 2010; 2014; 2018; 2022; 2026

Saudi Arabia competed at the 2022 Asian Games in Hangzhou, Zhejiang, China, which was held from 23 September 2023 to 8 October 2023.

== Competitors ==
Sport	Men	Women	Total
Archery	8	4	12
Athletics	28	0	28
Basketball	12	0	12
Boxing	4	2	6
Equestrian	4	2	6
Esports	21	0	21
Fencing	8	4	12
Football	22	0	22
Golf	4	0	4
Handball	16	0	16
Ju-jitsu	7	1	8
Karate	4	1	5
Kurash	0	1	1
Rowing	3	1	4
Shooting	12	0	12
Table tennis	5	0	5
Taekwondo	6	2	8
Tennis	1	1	2
Weightlifting	3	1	4
Total	168	20	188

== Medal summary ==
=== Medals by sports ===
Sport	1st place, gold medalist(s)	2nd place, silver medalist(s)	3rd place, bronze medalist(s)	Total
Athletics	2	2	1	5
Equestrian	2	0	0	2
Ju-jitsu	0	0	2	2
Karate	0	0	1	1
Total	4	2	4	10

== Kurash ==
Women

Athlete	Event	Round of 16	Quarter-finals	Semi-finals	Final	
Athlete	Event	Opposition Score	Opposition Score	Opposition Score	Opposition Score	Rank
Wadyan Almwlld	–70 kg	Bye	Kakhorova (UZB); L 0–10	Did not advance		

== Taekwondo ==
Poomsae

Athlete	Event	Round of 16	Quarter-final	Semi-final	Final	
Athlete	Event	Opposition Score	Opposition Score	Opposition Score	Opposition Score	Rank
Wahid Moghis	Men's individual	Husain (BAN); W 7.40–6.46	Trần (VIE); L 7.23–7.49	Did not advance		
Abrar Bukhari	Women's individual	Naila (PAK); L 7.18–7.34	Did not advance			

Kyorugi

Athlete	Event	Round of 32	Round of 16	Quarter-final	Semi-final	Final	
Athlete	Event	Opposition Score	Opposition Score	Opposition Score	Opposition Score	Opposition Score	Rank
Riad Hamdi	Men's −58 kg	Kumal (NEP); W 2–0	Huang (TPE); L 0–2	Did not advance			
Zakariya Muhammed Ghali	Men's −63 kg	Khando (BHU); W 2–0	Hneineh (LBN); L 0–2	Did not advance			
Hasham Dookhy	Men's −68 kg	Al-Lami (IRQ); W 2–1	Xiao (CHN); L 0–2	Did not advance			
Mohammed Mustafa Alsowaiq	Men's −80 kg	Bye	Cea (PHI); L 0–2	Did not advance			
Ali Mabrouk Almabrouk	Men's +80 kg	—	Song (CHN); L 0–2	Did not advance			
Dunya Abutaleb	Women's −49 kg	Bye	Kang (KOR); W 2–0	Guo (CHN); L 0–2	Did not advance		

== Tennis ==
Singles

Athlete	Event	Round of 64	Round of 32	Round of 16	Quarter-finals	Semi-finals	Final	
Athlete	Event	Opposition Score	Opposition Score	Opposition Score	Opposition Score	Opposition Score	Opposition Score	Rank
Ammar Alhogbani	Men's	Naif (QAT); W 6–0, 6–0	Zhang (CHN); L 5–7, 2–6	Did not advance				
Yara Alhogbani	Women's	Chogsomjav (MGL); L 0–6, 1–6	Did not advance					

Mixed

Athlete	Event	Round of 64	Round of 32	Round of 16	Quarter-finals	Semi-finals	Final	
Athlete	Event	Opposition Score	Opposition Score	Opposition Score	Opposition Score	Opposition Score	Opposition Score	Rank
Yara Alhogbani; Ammar Alhogbani	Doubles	Bye	Liang / Huang (TPE); L 2–6, 2–6	Did not advance				
