= Wushu at the 2022 Asian Games – Men's changquan =

Men's changquan at the 2022 Asian Games
- Venue: Xiaoshan Guali Sports Centre
- Dates: 24 September 2023
- Competitors: 14 from 12 nations

Medalists
gold medal	Sun Peiyuan	China
silver medal	Edgar Xavier Marvelo	Indonesia
bronze medal	Song Chi Kuan	Macau

The men's changquan competition at the 2022 Asian Games was held on 24 September 2023 at Xiaoshan Guali Sports Centre in Hangzhou, China.

== Schedule ==
All times are China Standard Time (UTC+08:00)

Date	Time	Event
Sunday, 24 September 2023	09:00	Final

== Results ==
Rank	Athlete	Score
1st place, gold medalist(s)	Sun Peiyuan (CHN)	9.840
2nd place, silver medalist(s)	Edgar Xavier Marvelo (INA)	9.786
3rd place, bronze medalist(s)	Song Chi Kuan (MAC)	9.760
4	Motoyoshi Araki (JPN)	9.730
5	M. Suraj Singh (IND)	9.730
6	Anjul Namdeo (IND)	9.710
7	Bijay Sinjali (NEP)	9.703
8	Aziz Kakhramonov (UZB)	9.643
9	Weerachat Koolsawatmongkol (THA)	9.470
10	Ehsan Peighambari (IRI)	9.443
11	Park Geun-woo (KOR)	9.413
12	Kuong Chi Hin (MAC)	9.040
13	Wong Weng Son (MAS)	9.000
14	Sandrex Gainsan (PHI)	8.763
