= Lee Yong-mun =

Korean wushu practitioner

Personal information
- Born: July 12, 1995 (age 30)
- Height: 1.68 m (5 ft 6 in)
- Weight: 73 kg (161 lb)

Sport
- Sport: Wushu
- Event(s): Nanquan, Nandao, Nangun
- Team: Korean Wushu Team
Medal record
Representing South Korea
Men's Wushu Taolu
World Championships
Gold medal – first place	2013 Kuala Lumpur	Nanquan (compulsory)
Silver medal – second place	2015 Jakarta	Nangun
Silver medal – second place	2017 Kazan	Duilian
Silver medal – second place	2019 Shanghai	Duilian
Silver medal – second place	2023 Fort Worth	Nangun
Bronze medal – third place	2017 Kazan	Nangun
Asian Games
Bronze medal – third place	2018 Jakarta-Palembang	Nanquan+Nangun
Silver medal – second place	2022 Hangzhou	Nanquan+Nangun

Lee Yong-mun (Korean: 이용문; RR: iyongmun; born July 12, 1995) is a wushu taolu athlete from South Korea.

== Career ==
Lee made his international debut at the 2013 World Wushu Championships where he became world champion in nanquan (compulsory). Two years later, he won a silver medal in nangun at the 2015 World Wushu Championships. At the 2017 World Wushu Championships, he won a silver and bronze medal in duilian and nangun respectively. He then won the bronze medal in men's nanquan at the 2018 Asian Games. Lee then competed in the 2019 World Wushu Championships where he was a silver medalist in duilian.

After the start of the COVID-19 pandemic, Lee competed in the 2022 Asian Games where he won the silver medal in nanquan and nangun combined. Shortly after, he competed in the 2023 World Wushu Championships and won the silver medal in nangun.

== Personal life ==
Lee's brother, Lee Yong-hyun, is also a highly skilled wushu athlete.

== See also ==
- List of Asian Games medalists in wushu
