= Tajikistan at the 2022 Asian Games =

Tajikistan at the multi-sports event

- IOC code: TJK
- NOC: National Olympic Committee of the Republic of Tajikistan
- Website: www.olympic.tj

in Hangzhou 19 September 2023 – 8 October 2023
- Competitors: 106 in 18 sports
- Flag bearers: Malika Lagutenko; Temur Rakhimov
- Medals Ranked 24th: Gold 2 Silver 1 Bronze 4 Total 7

Asian Games appearances (overview)
- 1994; 1998; 2002; 2006; 2010; 2014; 2018; 2022; 2026

Tajikistan competed at the 2022 Asian Games in Hangzhou, China, from 23 September to 8 October 2023.

== Competitors ==
Sport	Men	Women	Total
Archery	3	1	4
Athletics	3	1	4
Beach volleyball	2	2	4
Boxing	7	5	12
Breakdancing	2	2	4
Canoeing	7	0	7
Esports	12	0	12
Judo	7	4	11
Ju-jitsu	5	0	5
Karate	3	0	3
Kurash	3	0	3
Shooting	2	2	4
Swimming	7	1	8
Table tennis	3	1	4
Taekwondo	3	3	6
Tennis	4	1	5
Wrestling	8	1	9
Wushu	1	0	1
Total	82	24	106

== Medalists ==
The following Tajikistan competitors won medals at the Games.

Medal	Name	Sport	Event	Date
Gold	Davlat Boltaev	Boxing	Men's 92 kg	3 Oct
Gold	Somon Makhmadbekov	Judo	Men's –81 kg	25 Sep
Silver	Temur Rakhimov	Judo	Men's +100 kg	26 Sep
Bronze	Behruzi Khojazoda	Judo	Men's –73 kg	25 Sep

Medals by sport
Sport	1st place, gold medalist(s)	2nd place, silver medalist(s)	3rd place, bronze medalist(s)	Total
Boxing	1	0	1	2
Judo	1	1	1	3
Kurash	0	0	2	2

Medals by day
Day	Date	1st place, gold medalist(s)	2nd place, silver medalist(s)	3rd place, bronze medalist(s)	Total
1	September 24	0	0	0	0
2	September 25	1	0	1	2
3	September 26	0	1	0	1
4	September 27	0	0	0	0
5	September 28	0	0	0	0
6	September 29	0	0	0	0
7	September 30	0	0	1	1

== Judo ==
Tajikistan entered their judo practitioners to compete at the Games.

Key:

- 1st number — Ippon
- 2nd number — Waza-ari
- s — Shido

Men

Athlete	Event	Round of 32	Round of 16	Quarter-finals	Semi-finals	Repechage	Final / BM	Rank
Athlete	Event	Opposition Result	Opposition Result	Opposition Result	Opposition Result	Opposition Result	Opposition Result	Rank
Mehrzod Sufiev	–60 kg	Bye	Namgyel (BHU); W 10–00	Enkhtaivan (MGL); L 00s1–10s2	Did not advance	Kondo (JPN); W 10–00	Shamshadin (KAZ); L 00s2–01	4
Obid Dzhebov	–66 kg	Trương (VIE); W 01–00s1	Xue (CHN); W 10–00	Yondonperenlei (MGL); L 00–10s2	Did not advance	Kyrgyzbayev (KAZ); W 10s1–00s1	An (KOR); L 00s1–01s2	4
Behruzi Khojazoda	–73 kg	Bye	Nakano (PHI); W 10–00s2	Shamshayev (KAZ); W 01–00s2	Hashimoto (JPN); L 00s1–01s2	Bye	Qing (CHN); W 10s2–00	3rd place, bronze medalist(s)
Somon Makhmadbekov	–81 kg	Bye	Thwaib (PLE); W 11–00	Masabirov (KGZ); W 10s1–00	Zhubanazar (KAZ); W 01s1–00	—N/a	Lee (KOR); W 01s2–00	1st place, gold medalist(s)
Komronshokh Ustopiriyon	–90 kg	Bye	Chang (TPE); W 10s1–00	Aram (UAE); L 01s3–11s1	Did not advance	Caramnob (LBN); L DNS	Did not advance	
Isroil Rakhimov	–100 kg	Bye	Majanow (TKM); L 01s3–10s2	Did not advance				
Temur Rakhimov	+100 kg	—N/a	Bye	Li (CHN); W 10s2–00s3	Kim (KOR); W 01s2–00s2	—N/a	Magomedomarov (UAE); L 00–10s1	2nd place, silver medalist(s)

Women

Athlete	Event	Round of 16	Quarter-finals	Semi-finals	Repechage	Final / BM	Rank
Athlete	Event	Opposition Result	Opposition Result	Opposition Result	Opposition Result	Opposition Result	Rank
Madina Qurbonzoda	–48 kg	Lee (KOR); L 00s2–10	Did not advance				
Akhliya Muminova	–52 kg	Ozyyeva (TKM); W 10s1–01	Keldiyorova (UZB); L 00–10	Did not advance	Tynbayeva (KAZ); L 00s3–10	Did not advance	
Fazilat Gulboeva	–57 kg	Nishanbayeva (KAZ); L 00s1–10s1	Did not advance				
Mavluda Odinaeva	–63 kg	Syerina (INA); W 01s2–00s1	Tang (CHN); L 00–10	Did not advance	Kochkonbaeva (KGZ); L 00s2–11	Did not advance	

== Kurash ==
Men

Athlete	Event	Round of 16	Quarter-finals	Semi-finals	Final	
Athlete	Event	Opposition Score	Opposition Score	Opposition Score	Opposition Score	Rank
Murodzoda Khairandeshi	–66 kg	Haddad (LBN); W 10–0	Enkhtaivan (MGL); W 10–3	Barimanlou (IRI); L 0–10	Did not advance	3rd place, bronze medalist(s)
Navruz Karimzod	–81 kg	Shaimerdenov (KAZ); L 000–100	Did not advance			
Khaknazar Nazarov	–90 kg	Asylbek Uulu (KGZ); W 001"–001	Komatsu (JPN); W 100–000	Kim (KOR); L 002–002"	Did not advance	

== Taekwondo ==
Kyorugi

Athlete	Event	Round of 32	Round of 16	Quarter-finals	Semi-finals	Final	
Athlete	Event	Opposition Score	Opposition Score	Opposition Score	Opposition Score	Opposition Score	Rank
Nurullo Murodov	Men's −58 kg	Rezaee (AFG); L 0–2	Did not advance				
Mahmadjon Sunatov	Men's −63 kg	Sadr Zada (AFG); L 1–2	Did not advance				
Aslanbek Fazylov	Men's −68 kg	Kurmanaliev (KGZ); L 0–2	Did not advance				
Shirinmohi Mirshakarzoda	Women's −49 kg	Garces (PHI); L 0–2	Did not advance				
Munisa Oimatova	Women's −57 kg	—N/a	Mirabzalova (UZB); L 0–2	Did not advance			
Munira Abdusalomova	Women's +67 kg	—N/a	Pan (TPE); L 0–2	Did not advance			

== Tennis ==
Men

Athlete	Event	Round of 64	Round of 32	Round of 16	Quarter-finals	Semi-finals	Final	
Athlete	Event	Opposition Score	Opposition Score	Opposition Score	Opposition Score	Opposition Score	Opposition Score	Rank
Sanatullo Isroilov	Singles	Bye	Ramanathan (IND); L w/o	Did not advance				
Firuz Mukhidinov	Singles	Bye	Zhukayev (KAZ); L 0^{r}–3	Did not advance				
Bakhtiyor Isroilov; Sobir Saidov	Doubles	—N/a	Yevseyev / Zhukayev (KAZ); L 0–6, 0–6	Did not advance				
Sunatullo Isroilov; Firuz Mukhidinov	Doubles	—N/a	Barki / Rungkat (INA); L 0–6, 0–6	Did not advance				

Women

Athlete	Event	Round of 64	Round of 32	Round of 16	Quarter-finals	Semi-finals	Final	
Athlete	Event	Opposition Score	Opposition Score	Opposition Score	Opposition Score	Opposition Score	Opposition Score	Rank
Sumaya Tukhtaeva	Singles	Suhail (PAK); L 2–6, 3–6	Did not advance					

Mixed

Athlete	Event	Round of 64	Round of 32	Round of 16	Quarter-finals	Semi-finals	Final	
Athlete	Event	Opposition Score	Opposition Score	Opposition Score	Opposition Score	Opposition Score	Opposition Score	Rank
Sumaya Tukhtaeva; Bakhtiyor Isroilov	Doubles	Bye	Yang / Zhang (CHN); W w/o	Kulambayeva / Lomakin (KAZ); L 0–6, 1–6	Did not advance			

== Wushu ==
Taolu

Athlete	Event	Event 1		Event 2		Total	Rank
Athlete	Event	Result	Rank	Result	Rank	Total	Rank
Ilyoskhon Valiev	Men's nanquan and nangun	7.346	20	7.366	20	14.712	20
