= Marjona Malikova =

Uzbekistani chess player (born 2002)

Personal information
- Born: Marjona Malikova Abdumajid qizi July 17, 2002 (age 24) Samarkand, Uzbekistan

Chess career
- Country: Uzbekistan
- Title: Woman International Master (2023)
- Peak rating: 2091 (October 2024)
Medal record
Representing Uzbekistan
Silver medal – second place	2019 Tashkent	Individual
Bronze medal – third place	2019 Samarkand	Individual
Bronze medal – third place	2022 Issyk-Kul	Individual

Marjona Malikova (born July 17, 2002) is an Uzbekistani chess player. She holds the title of Woman International Master (2023) and is a member of the Uzbekistan national chess team. In 2019, she won the Uzbekistan Chess Championship, and in 2022, she participated in the 44th World Chess Olympiad.

== Biography ==
Marjona Malikova was born on July 17, 2002, in the Akdarynsky District of the Samarkand Region. She began playing chess at the age of nine. Starting in 2017, she began participating in major chess tournaments. In that year, Malikova secured the eleventh position at the Asian Championship in Tashkent. In the same year, she took part in the international chess tournament "Qarshi-Open" in Karshi.

In 2018, Malikova competed in the Western Asian Countries Chess Championship held in Tashkent and secured the fifth position. In the same year, she won the national school chess championship.

In 2019, during the Asian Chess Championship in Tashkent, Malikova won a silver medal. In the same year, she became the champion of Uzbekistan in chess.

In 2020, she won the bronze medal at the Anarkulov Memorial Chess Competition in Samarkand. However, in 2021, she finished in sixth place at the Uzbekistan Women's Chess Championship, and in 2022, she placed fourth in the same championship.

In 2022, the Uzbekistan national chess team, which included Marjona Malikova, participated in the 44th World Chess Olympiad in Chennai, India. In seven games, she won three and drew one. For her participation in the chess Olympiad, President Shavkat Mirziyoyev of Uzbekistan awarded Marjona Malikova the "Kelajak bunyodkori" (Creator of the Future) medal. In the same year, Malikova won the gold medal at the Western Asia Chess Championship 2022 in Issyk-Kul, Korumdu, Kyrgyzstan.

In 2023, she achieved the title of Woman International Master.
