= Bekadil Shaimerdenov =

Kazakhstani judoka and kurash practitioner (born 1997)

Personal information
- Born: 22 July 1997 (age 28)
- Occupation: Judoka

Sport
- Country: Kazakhstan
- Sport: Judo
- Weight class: ‍–‍73 kg, ‍–‍81 kg

Achievements and titles
- World Champ.: R64 (2018)
Medal record
Representing Kazakhstan
Men's kurash
Asian Games
Silver medal – second place	2022 Hangzhou	‍–‍81 kg
Men's judo
IJF Grand Prix
Bronze medal – third place	2018 Agadir	‍–‍73 kg
Summer Universiade
Bronze medal – third place	2017 Taipei	‍–‍73 kg

Profile at external databases
- IJF: 23109
- JudoInside.com: 51001
- Updated on 5 December 2022

Bekadil Shaimerdenov (Бекадил Агадилович Шаймерденов, born 22 July 1997) is a Kazakhstani judoka and kurash practitioner.

He won bronze medals in judo at the 2017 Summer Universiade and the 2018 Judo Grand Prix Agadir. Shaimerdenov also competed in kurash at the 2018 Asian Games, earning a silver medal in the men's 81 kg event.
