= Macau at the 2022 Asian Games =

- IOC code: MAC
- NOC: Macau Sports and Olympic Committee

in Hangzhou
- Competitors: 183
- Medals Ranked 17th: Gold 1 Silver 1 Bronze 2 Total 4

Asian Games appearances (overview)
- 1990; 1994; 1998; 2002; 2006; 2010; 2014; 2018; 2022; 2026

Macau competed at the 2022 Asian Games held in Hangzhou. The territory's delegation consisted of 183 athletes.

== Medalists ==
Medal	Name	Sport	Event	Date
Gold	Li Yi	Wushu	Women's changquan	25 September
Silver	Cai Feilong	Wushu	Men's sanda 75 kg	28 September
Bronze	Huang Junhua	Wushu	Men's nanquan	26 September
Bronze	Song Chi Kuan	Wushu	Men's changquan	24 September

== Badminton ==
=== Men ===
Athlete	Event	Round of 64	Round of 32	Round of 16	Quarterfinals	Semi-finals	Final	
Athlete	Event	Opposition Score	Opposition Score	Opposition Score	Opposition Score	Opposition Score	Opposition Score	Rank
Pui Chi Chon	Singles	Teh (SIN) L (9–21, 13–21)	Did not advance					
Pui Pang Fong	Singles	Chou T-c (TPE) L (13–21, 14–21)	Did not advance					
Leong Iok Chong Vong Kok Weng	Doubles	Carnando / Marthin (INA) L (9–21,8–21)	Did not advance					

=== Women ===
Athlete	Event	Round of 64	Round of 32	Round of 16	Quarterfinals	Semi-finals	Final	
Athlete	Event	Opposition Score	Opposition Score	Opposition Score	Opposition Score	Opposition Score	Opposition Score	Rank
Pui Chi Wa	Singles	An Se (KOR) L (9–21, 5–21)	Did not advance					
Ng Weng Chi Pui Chi Wa	Doubles	Lee C-h / Teng C-h (TPE) L (17–21, 9–21)	Did not advance					

== Shooting ==
Individual Men's
Athlete	Event	Qualification		Final	
Athlete	Event	Score	Rank	Score	Rank
Pak Kam In	25 metre rapid fire pistol	508	30	Did not advance	

== Tennis ==
Men

Athlete	Event	Round of 64	Round of 32	Round of 16	Quarter-finals	Semi-finals	Final	
Athlete	Event	Opposition Score	Opposition Score	Opposition Score	Opposition Score	Opposition Score	Opposition Score	Rank
Marco Leung	Singles	Bye	Nagal (IND); L 0–6, 0–6	Did not advance				
Kyle Tang	Singles	Barki (INA); L 3–6, 2–6	Did not advance					
Lam Chin Lok; Marco Leung	Doubles	—N/a	Alharrasi / Naif (QAT); L 3–6, 1–6	Did not advance				

Women

Athlete	Event	Round of 64	Round of 32	Round of 16	Quarter-finals	Semi-finals	Final	
Athlete	Event	Opposition Score	Opposition Score	Opposition Score	Opposition Score	Opposition Score	Opposition Score	Rank
Iu Si Nong	Singles	Bye	Karunaratne (HKG); L 0–6, 0–6	Did not advance				
Jamie Lau	Singles	Bye	Tararudee (THA); L 2–6, 0–6	Did not advance				
Iu Si Nong; Leong Weng Si	Doubles	—N/a	Ku / Park (KOR); L 0–6, 0–6	Did not advance				

Mixed

Athlete	Event	Round of 64	Round of 32	Round of 16	Quarter-finals	Semi-finals	Final	
Athlete	Event	Opposition Score	Opposition Score	Opposition Score	Opposition Score	Opposition Score	Opposition Score	Rank
Jamie Lau; Kyle Tang	Doubles	Bye	Chong / Wong (HKG); L 3–6, 0–6	Did not advance				

== Wushu ==
=== Taolu ===
Athlete	Event	Event 1		Event 2		Total	Rank
Athlete	Event	Result	Rank	Result	Rank	Total	Rank
Song Chi Kuan	Men's changquan	9.760	3	—N/a		9.760	3rd place, bronze medalist(s)
Huang Junhua	Men's nanquan and nangun	9.723	3	9.740	2	19.463	3rd place, bronze medalist(s)
Chan Chi Ngou	Men's nanquan and nangun	8.570	19	9.470	17	18.040	18
Wong Kui Sin	Men's taijiquan and taijijian	9.713	13	9.483	12	19.196	12
Li Yi	Women's changquan	9.786	1	—N/a		9.786	1st place, gold medalist(s)

=== Sanda ===
Athlete	Event	Round of 16	Quarter-finals	Semi-finals	Final	
Athlete	Event	Opposition Score	Opposition Score	Opposition Score	Opposition Score	Rank
Ku Hio Lam	Men's –56 kg	Huanak (THA); L 0–2	Did not advance			
Cai Feilong	Men's –75 kg	Bye	Jumamyradov (TKM); W 2–0	Amankulov (KGZ); W KO	Sabri (IRI); L PD	2nd place, silver medalist(s)
