= Lebanon at the 2022 Asian Games =

- IOC code: LBN
- NOC: Lebanese Olympic Committee

in Hangzhou, China 23 September 2023 – 8 October 2023
- Competitors: 28 (9 men and 19 women)
- Flag bearer: Laetitia Aoun
- Medals Ranked 36th: Gold 0 Silver 0 Bronze 1 Total 1

Asian Games appearances (overview)
- 1978; 1982; 1986; 1990; 1994; 1998; 2002; 2006; 2010; 2014; 2018; 2022; 2026

Lebanon competed at the 2022 Asian Games in Hangzhou, Zhejiang, China, which began on 23 September 2023 and ended on 8 October 2023. The event was scheduled to be held in September 2022 but was postponed due to the rising COVID-19 cases in China. The event was later rescheduled to be held in September–October 2023.

== Medalists ==
=== Medals by sport ===
Medals by sport
Sport	Gold	Silver	Bronze	Total
Judo	0	0	1	1
Total	0	0	1	1
