= Nepal at the 2022 Asian Games =

Nepal in Multi Sports event

- IOC code: NEP
- NOC: Nepal Olympic Committee

in Hangzhou, China 23 September 2023 – 8 October 2023
- Medals Ranked 36th: Gold 0 Silver 1 Bronze 1 Total 2

Asian Games appearances (overview)
- 1951; 1954; 1958; 1962; 1966; 1970; 1974; 1978; 1982; 1986; 1990; 1994; 1998; 2002; 2006; 2010; 2014; 2018; 2022; 2026

Nepal participated at the 2022 Asian Games, which was held in Hangzhou, Zhejiang, China, from 23 September 2023 to 8 October 2023. The event was originally scheduled from 10 to 25 September 2022 but due to COVID-19 pandemic cases rising in China the event has been postponed and rescheduled to September-October 2023.

== Competitors ==
The following is the list of sports and numbers of athletes which are scheduled to participate at the 2022 Asian Games:

Sport	Men	Women	Total
Archery	2	2	4
Athletics	4	4	8
Badminton	4	4	8
Basketball	—N/a	TBA	13
Boxing	TBA	TBA	4
Canoeing	1	—N/a	1
Cricket	15	—N/a	15
Cycling	1	1	2
Dancesport	1	—N/a	1
Esports	TBA	TBA	23
Fencing	3	3	6
Football	—N/a	22	22
Golf	4	2	6
Handball	—N/a	16	16
Judo	4	4	8
Kabaddi	—N/a	12	12
Karate	4	4	8
Rugby	12	—N/a	12
Shooting	—N/a	2	2
Squash	3	3	6
Swimming	TBA	TBA	6
Table Tennis	3	3	6
Tennis	3	3	6
Taekwondo	6	5	11
Triathlon	2	2	4
Volleyball	12	12	24
Weightlifting	3	2	5
Wrestling	2	2	4
Wushu	7	5	12
Total	104	125	234

== Medalists ==
=== Medals by sport ===
Medals by sport
Sport	Gold	Silver	Bronze	Total
Kabaddi	0	0	1	1
Karate	0	1	0	1
Total	0	1	1	2

== Cricket ==
On 28 July 2023, Cricket Association of Nepal announced the men's squads for 2022 Asian Games.

Team	Event	Group Stage			Quarterfinal	Semifinal	Final / BM	
Team	Event	Opposition Result	Opposition Result	Rank	Opposition Result	Opposition Result	Opposition Result	Rank
Nepal men's	Men's tournament	Mongolia; W 273 runs	Maldives; W 138 runs	1 Q	India; L 23 runs	Did not Advance		5th

=== Men's tournament ===
Coach
(India) Monty Desai
Squads

1. Rohit Paudel (c)
2. Dipendra Singh Airee
3. Binod Bhandari (wk)
4. Avinash Bohara
5. Kushal Bhurtel
6. Sundeep Jora
7. Kushal Malla
8. Aasif Sheikh (wk)
9. Pratis GC
10. Gulsan Jha
11. Sompal Kami
12. Karan KC
13. Sandeep Lamichhane
14. ~~Lalit Rajbanshi~~
15. Bibek Yadav

=== Group Stage ===
27 September 2023
09:00
Scorecard

Nepal; 314/3 (20 overs)	v	Mongolia; 41 (13.1 overs)
Kushal Malla 137* (50); Luvsanzundui Erdenebulgan 1/47 (4 overs)		Davaasuren Jamyansuren 10 (23); Karan KC 2/1 (2 overs)

Nepal won by 273 runs
Zhejiang University of Technology Cricket Field, Hangzhou
Umpires: Arif Ansari (THA) and Chris Thurgate (JPN)

- Mongolia won the toss and elected to field.
- Mungun Altankhuyag, Namsrai Bat-yalalt, Luvsanzundui Erdenebulgan, Davaasuren Jamyansuren, Od Lutbayar, Enkhtuvshin Munkhbat, Nyambaatar Naranbaatar, Enkh-erdene Otgonbayar, Tur-erdene Sumiya, Buyantushig Terbish and Tumursukh Turmunkh (MGL) all made their T20I debuts.
- Nepal's total was the highest team total in men's T20Is.
- Kushal Malla (NEP) scored his first century in T20Is.
- Kushal Malla also scored the quickest century in men's T20Is, in terms of deliveries faced (34).
- Dipendra Singh Airee (NEP) scored the quickest half-century in men's T20Is, in terms of deliveries faced (9).
- Nepal's margin of victory (273 runs) was the biggest in men's T20Is.
- Nepal scored a record number of sixes (26) in a men's T20I innings.

1 October 2023
09:00
Scorecard

Nepal; 212/7 (20 overs)	v	Maldives; 74 (19.4 overs)
Rohit Paudel 52 (27); Nazwan Ismail 3/17 (4 overs)		Muawiyath Ghanee 36 (34); Abinash Bohara 6/11 (3.4 overs)

Nepal won by 138 runs
Zhejiang University of Technology Cricket Field, Hangzhou
Umpires: Mahmood Kharoti (AFG) and Ramasamy Venkatesh (HKG)

- Nepal won the toss and elected to bat.
- Abinash Bohara (Nep) took his first five-wicket haul in T20Is.
- Nepal qualified for the knockout stage as a result of this match.

Quarter-final

3 October
9:00
Scorecard

India; 202/4 (20 overs)	v	Nepal; 179/9 (20 overs)
Yashasvi Jaiswal 100 (49); Dipendra Singh Airee 2/31 (4 overs)		Dipendra Singh Airee 32 (15); Ravi Bishnoi 3/24 (4 overs)

India won by 23 runs
Zhejiang University of Technology Cricket Field, Hangzhou
Umpires: Mahmood Kharoti (AFG) and Asif Yaqoob (PAK)

- India won the toss and elected to bat.

== Kabaddi ==
Team	Event	Group stage			Semifinal	Final	
Team	Event	Opposition Score	Opposition Score	Rank	Opposition Score	Opposition Score	Rank
Nepal women	Women's tournament	Bangladesh; W 37–24	Iran; L 19–43	2 Q	India; L 17–61	Did not Advance	3rd place, bronze medalist(s)

=== Women's tournament ===
Group B

Pos	Team	Pld	W	D	L	PF	PA	PD	Pts	Qualification
1	Iran	2	2	0	0	97	35	+62	4	Semifinals
2	Nepal	2	1	0	1	56	67	−11	2	Semifinals
3	Bangladesh	2	0	0	2	40	91	−51	0	

Source: Official website

2 October
10:30

Bangladesh	24–37 (HT: 16–21)	Nepal

Xiaoshan Guali Sports Centre, Hangzhou

3 October
11:00

Nepal	19–43 (HT: 11–19)	Iran

Xiaoshan Guali Sports Centre, Hangzhou

Semi–Final

6 October
9:30

India	61–17 (HT: 29–10)	Nepal

Xiaoshan Guali Sports Centre, Hangzhou
