= Qatar at the 2022 Asian Games =

- IOC code: QAT
- NOC: Qatar Olympic Committee

in Hangzhou, China 23 September 2023 – 8 October 2023
- Medals Ranked 15th: Gold 5 Silver 6 Bronze 3 Total 14

Asian Games appearances (overview)
- 1978; 1982; 1986; 1990; 1994; 1998; 2002; 2006; 2010; 2014; 2018; 2022; 2026

Qatar competed at the 2022 Asian Games in Hangzhou, Zhejiang, China, which began on 23 September 2023 and ended on 8 October 2023. The event was scheduled to be held in September 2022 but was postponed due to the rising COVID-19 cases in China. The event was later rescheduled to be held in September–October 2023.

== Medalists ==
=== Medals by sport ===
Medals by sport
| Sport | Gold | Silver | Bronze | Total |
|---|---|---|---|---|
| Athletics | 3 | 3 | 0 | 6 |
| Beach volleyball | 1 | 0 | 0 | 1 |
| Handball | 1 | 0 | 0 | 1 |
| Shooting | 0 | 1 | 2 | 3 |
| Basketball | 0 | 1 | 0 | 1 |
| Equestrian | 0 | 1 | 0 | 1 |
| Squash | 0 | 0 | 1 | 1 |
| Total | 5 | 6 | 3 | 14 |
