= Chess at the 2022 Asian Games – Women's team standard =

Women's team standard at the 2022 Asian Games
- Venue: Hangzhou Chess Academy
- Date: 29 September – 7 October 2023
- Competitors: 58 from 12 nations

Medalists
gold medal	China; Hou Yifan, Zhu Jiner, Tan Zhongyi, Zhai Mo
silver medal	India; Koneru Humpy, Harika Dronavalli, Vaishali Rameshbabu, Vantika Agrawal, Savitha Shri Baskar
bronze medal	Kazakhstan; Bibisara Assaubayeva, Meruert Kamalidenova, Zhansaya Abdumalik, Dinara Saduakassova, Alua Nurmanova

The women's team competition at the 2022 Asian Games in Hangzhou was held from 29 September to 7 October 2023 at the Hangzhou Qi-Yuan Hall.

== Schedule ==
All times are China Standard Time (UTC+08:00)

Date	Time	Event
Friday, 29 September 2023	15:00	Round 1
Saturday, 30 September 2023	15:00	Round 2
Sunday, 1 October 2023	15:00	Round 3
Monday, 2 October 2023	15:00	Round 4
Tuesday, 3 October 2023	15:00	Round 5
Wednesday, 4 October 2023	15:00	Round 6
Thursday, 5 October 2023	15:00	Round 7
Friday, 6 October 2023	15:00	Round 8
Sunday, 7 October 2023	15:00	Round 9

== Results ==
Legend

- GP — Game points
- HH — Head to head

=== Round 1 ===
	Score	
China	2–2	Uzbekistan
Hou Yifan	1–0	Nilufar Yakubbaeva
Zhu Jiner	0–1	Umida Omonova
Tan Zhongyi	0–1	Afruza Khamdamova
Zhai Mo	1–0	Marjona Malikova
Philippines	½–3½	India
Janelle Mae Frayna	0–1	Harika Dronavalli
Marie Antoinette San Diego	0–1	Vaishali Rameshbabu
Jan Jodilyn Fronda	½–½	Vantika Agrawal
Bernadette Galas	0–1	Savitha Shri Baskar
Kazakhstan	4–0	United Arab Emirates
Meruert Kamalidenova	1–0	Wafia Al-Maamari
Zhansaya Abdumalik	1–0	Aisha Al-Muaini
Dinara Saduakassova	1–0	Moza Al-Mansouri
Alua Nurmanova	1–0	Anoud Bashkardi
South Korea	0–4	Indonesia
Park Sun-woo	0–1	Irene Kharisma Sukandar
Kang So-hyun	0–1	Dewi Ardhiani Anastasia Citra
Seo Ji-won	0–1	Chelsie Monica Ignesias Sihite
You Ga-ram	0–1	Ummi Fisabilillah
Vietnam	4–0	Thailand
Võ Thị Kim Phụng	1–0	Sarocha Chuemsakul
Nguyễn Thị Thanh An	1–0	Araya Prommuang
Nguyễn Thị Mai Hưng	1–0	Melita Buhagiar
Hoàng Thị Bảo Trâm	1–0	Sirin Bootsumran
Hong Kong	½–3½	Mongolia
Eunice Feng	0–1	Batkhuyagiin Möngöntuul
Liu Tian Yi	½–½	Altan-Ölziin Enkhtuul
Li Joy Ching	0–1	Boldbaataryn Altantuyaa
Liang Liyun	0–1	Bayarjargalyn Bayarmaa

=== Round 2 ===
	Score	
India	2½–1½	Vietnam
Koneru Humpy	½–½	Phạm Lê Thảo Nguyên
Vaishali Rameshbabu	1–0	Võ Thị Kim Phụng
Vantika Agrawal	½–½	Nguyễn Thị Thanh An
Savitha Shri Baskar	½–½	Hoàng Thị Bảo Trâm
Indonesia	2½–1½	Kazakhstan
Irene Kharisma Sukandar	0–1	Bibisara Assaubayeva
Medina Warda Aulia	1–0	Meruert Kamalidenova
Chelsie Monica Ignesias Sihite	½–½	Zhansaya Abdumalik
Ummi Fisabilillah	1–0	Alua Nurmanova
Mongolia	1–3	China
Törmönkhiin Mönkhzul	½–½	Hou Yifan
Batkhuyagiin Möngöntuul	½–½	Zhu Jiner
Altan-Ölziin Enkhtuul	0–1	Tan Zhongyi
Boldbaataryn Altantuyaa	0–1	Zhai Mo
Uzbekistan	2–2	Philippines
Nilufar Yakubbaeva	½–½	Janelle Mae Frayna
Umida Omonova	½–½	Marie Antoinette San Diego
Afruza Khamdamova	½–½	Jan Jodilyn Fronda
Maftuna Bobomurodova	½–½	Shania Mae Mendoza
United Arab Emirates	1–3	Hong Kong
Wafia Al-Maamari	0–1	Eunice Feng
Rouda Al-Serkal	0–1	Liu Tian Yi
Aisha Al-Muaini	½–½	Li Joy Ching
Moza Al-Mansouri	½–½	Leung Hoi Ting
Thailand	3½–½	South Korea
Sarocha Chuemsakul	1–0	Park Sun-woo
Araya Prommuang	1–0	Kang So-hyun
Melita Buhagiar	1–0	Kim Sa-rang
Sirin Bootsumran	½–½	Seo Ji-won

=== Round 3 ===
	Score	
Indonesia	½–3½	India
Medina Warda Aulia	0–1	Koneru Humpy
Dewi Ardhiani Anastasia Citra	0–1	Harika Dronavalli
Chelsie Monica Ignesias Sihite	½–½	Vaishali Rameshbabu
Ummi Fisabilillah	0–1	Vantika Agrawal
China	4–0	Thailand
Hou Yifan	1–0	Sarocha Chuemsakul
Zhu Jiner	1–0	Araya Prommuang
Tan Zhongyi	1–0	Melita Buhagiar
Zhai Mo	1–0	Sirin Bootsumran
Kazakhstan	3½–½	Mongolia
Bibisara Assaubayeva	1–0	Törmönkhiin Mönkhzul
Meruert Kamalidenova	1–0	Batkhuyagiin Möngöntuul
Zhansaya Abdumalik	1–0	Altan-Ölziin Enkhtuul
Dinara Saduakassova	½–½	Boldbaataryn Altantuyaa
Vietnam	2½–1½	Uzbekistan
Phạm Lê Thảo Nguyên	1–0	Nilufar Yakubbaeva
Nguyễn Thị Thanh An	0–1	Umida Omonova
Nguyễn Thị Mai Hưng	½–½	Afruza Khamdamova
Hoàng Thị Bảo Trâm	1–0	Marjona Malikova
Hong Kong	0–4	Philippines
Eunice Feng	0–1	Janelle Mae Frayna
Liu Tian Yi	0–1	Marie Antoinette San Diego
Li Joy Ching	0–1	Jan Jodilyn Fronda
Leung Hoi Ting	0–1	Shania Mae Mendoza
South Korea	1½–2½	United Arab Emirates
Park Sun-woo	1–0	Wafia Al-Maamari
Kim Sa-rang	0–1	Rouda Al-Serkal
Seo Ji-won	½–½	Aisha Al-Muaini
You Ga-ram	0–1	Moza Al-Mansouri

=== Round 4 ===
	Score	
India	1½–2½	China
Koneru Humpy	½–½	Hou Yifan
Harika Dronavalli	½–½	Zhu Jiner
Vaishali Rameshbabu	0–1	Tan Zhongyi
Vantika Agrawal	½–½	Zhai Mo
Vietnam	1–3	Kazakhstan
Phạm Lê Thảo Nguyên	½–½	Bibisara Assaubayeva
Võ Thị Kim Phụng	0–1	Meruert Kamalidenova
Nguyễn Thị Mai Hưng	½–½	Zhansaya Abdumalik
Hoàng Thị Bảo Trâm	0–1	Dinara Saduakassova
Philippines	2–2	Indonesia
Janelle Mae Frayna	½–½	Irene Kharisma Sukandar
Marie Antoinette San Diego	0–1	Medina Warda Aulia
Jan Jodilyn Fronda	1–0	Dewi Ardhiani Anastasia Citra
Shania Mae Mendoza	½–½	Chelsie Monica Ignesias Sihite
Mongolia	3½–½	United Arab Emirates
Törmönkhiin Mönkhzul	1–0	Rouda Al-Serkal
Altan-Ölziin Enkhtuul	1–0	Aisha Al-Muaini
Boldbaataryn Altantuyaa	½–½	Moza Al-Mansouri
Bayarjargalyn Bayarmaa	1–0	Anoud Bashkardi
Thailand	1½–2½	Hong Kong
Sarocha Chuemsakul	0–1	Eunice Feng
Araya Prommuang	½–½	Liu Tian Yi
Melita Buhagiar	0–1	Li Joy Ching
Sirin Bootsumran	1–0	Liang Liyun
Uzbekistan	4–0	South Korea
Nilufar Yakubbaeva	1–0	Park Sun-woo
Afruza Khamdamova	1–0	Kang So-hyun
Marjona Malikova	1–0	Kim Sa-rang
Maftuna Bobomurodova	1–0	You Ga-ram

=== Round 5 ===
	Score	
China	2½–1½	Kazakhstan
Hou Yifan	1–0	Bibisara Assaubayeva
Zhu Jiner	1–0	Meruert Kamalidenova
Tan Zhongyi	½–½	Zhansaya Abdumalik
Zhai Mo	0–1	Dinara Saduakassova
Mongolia	0–4	India
Törmönkhiin Mönkhzul	0–1	Koneru Humpy
Batkhuyagiin Möngöntuul	0–1	Vaishali Rameshbabu
Altan-Ölziin Enkhtuul	0–1	Vantika Agrawal
Bayarjargalyn Bayarmaa	0–1	Savitha Shri Baskar
Indonesia	½–3½	Vietnam
Irene Kharisma Sukandar	0–1	Phạm Lê Thảo Nguyên
Medina Warda Aulia	0–1	Võ Thị Kim Phụng
Chelsie Monica Ignesias Sihite	½–½	Nguyễn Thị Thanh An
Ummi Fisabilillah	0–1	Nguyễn Thị Mai Hưng
Hong Kong	0–4	Uzbekistan
Eunice Feng	0–1	Umida Omonova
Liu Tian Yi	0–1	Afruza Khamdamova
Li Joy Ching	0–1	Marjona Malikova
Liang Liyun	0–1	Maftuna Bobomurodova
South Korea	0–4	Philippines
Kang So-hyun	0–1	Janelle Mae Frayna
Kim Sa-rang	0–1	Jan Jodilyn Fronda
Seo Ji-won	0–1	Bernadette Galas
You Ga-ram	0–1	Shania Mae Mendoza
United Arab Emirates	1½–2½	Thailand
Wafia Al-Maamari	½–½	Sarocha Chuemsakul
Rouda Al-Serkal	0–1	Araya Prommuang
Moza Al-Mansouri	½–½	Melita Buhagiar
Anoud Bashkardi	½–½	Sirin Bootsumran

=== Round 6 ===
	Score	
Vietnam	½–3½	China
Phạm Lê Thảo Nguyên	0–1	Hou Yifan
Võ Thị Kim Phụng	0–1	Zhu Jiner
Nguyễn Thị Thanh An	½–½	Tan Zhongyi
Nguyễn Thị Mai Hưng	0–1	Zhai Mo
India	4–0	Uzbekistan
Koneru Humpy	1–0	Nilufar Yakubbaeva
Vaishali Rameshbabu	1–0	Umida Omonova
Vantika Agrawal	1–0	Afruza Khamdamova
Savitha Shri Baskar	1–0	Maftuna Bobomurodova
Kazakhstan	3½–½	Philippines
Bibisara Assaubayeva	1–0	Janelle Mae Frayna
Meruert Kamalidenova	1–0	Marie Antoinette San Diego
Zhansaya Abdumalik	½–½	Jan Jodilyn Fronda
Dinara Saduakassova	1–0	Shania Mae Mendoza
United Arab Emirates	½–3½	Indonesia
Wafia Al-Maamari	½–½	Irene Kharisma Sukandar
Rouda Al-Serkal	0–1	Medina Warda Aulia
Aisha Al-Muaini	0–1	Dewi Ardhiani Anastasia Citra
Anoud Bashkardi	0–1	Ummi Fisabilillah
Thailand	0–4	Mongolia
Sarocha Chuemsakul	0–1	Törmönkhiin Mönkhzul
Araya Prommuang	0–1	Batkhuyagiin Möngöntuul
Melita Buhagiar	0–1	Boldbaataryn Altantuyaa
Sirin Bootsumran	0–1	Bayarjargalyn Bayarmaa
South Korea	2–2	Hong Kong
Park Sun-woo	0–1	Eunice Feng
Kang So-hyun	1–0	Liu Tian Yi
Seo Ji-won	½–½	Li Joy Ching
You Ga-ram	½–½	Leung Hoi Ting

=== Round 7 ===
	Score	
China	3½–½	Indonesia
Hou Yifan	1–0	Irene Kharisma Sukandar
Zhu Jiner	½–½	Medina Warda Aulia
Tan Zhongyi	1–0	Dewi Ardhiani Anastasia Citra
Zhai Mo	1–0	Ummi Fisabilillah
Kazakhstan	2–2	India
Bibisara Assaubayeva	½–½	Koneru Humpy
Meruert Kamalidenova	0–1	Harika Dronavalli
Zhansaya Abdumalik	1–0	Vaishali Rameshbabu
Dinara Saduakassova	½–½	Vantika Agrawal
Hong Kong	1–3	Vietnam
Eunice Feng	1–0	Võ Thị Kim Phụng
Li Joy Ching	0–1	Nguyễn Thị Thanh An
Leung Hoi Ting	0–1	Nguyễn Thị Mai Hưng
Liang Liyun	0–1	Hoàng Thị Bảo Trâm
Uzbekistan	3½–½	Thailand
Nilufar Yakubbaeva	1–0	Sarocha Chuemsakul
Umida Omonova	1–0	Araya Prommuang
Afruza Khamdamova	½–½	Melita Buhagiar
Maftuna Bobomurodova	1–0	Sirin Bootsumran
Philippines	2½–1½	United Arab Emirates
Marie Antoinette San Diego	1–0	Wafia Al-Maamari
Jan Jodilyn Fronda	½–½	Rouda Al-Serkal
Bernadette Galas	0–1	Aisha Al-Muaini
Shania Mae Mendoza	1–0	Moza Al-Mansouri
Mongolia	4–0	South Korea
Törmönkhiin Mönkhzul	1–0	Park Sun-woo
Altan-Ölziin Enkhtuul	1–0	Kang So-hyun
Boldbaataryn Altantuyaa	1–0	Kim Sa-rang
Bayarjargalyn Bayarmaa	1–0	Seo Ji-won

=== Round 8 ===
	Score	
Philippines	0–4	China
Janelle Mae Frayna	0–1	Hou Yifan
Marie Antoinette San Diego	0–1	Zhu Jiner
Jan Jodilyn Fronda	0–1	Tan Zhongyi
Shania Mae Mendoza	0–1	Zhai Mo
India	4–0	Hong Kong
Harika Dronavalli	1–0	Eunice Feng
Vaishali Rameshbabu	1–0	Liu Tian Yi
Vantika Agrawal	1–0	Li Joy Ching
Savitha Shri Baskar	1–0	Liang Liyun
South Korea	0–4	Kazakhstan
Park Sun-woo	0–1	Bibisara Assaubayeva
Kim Sa-rang	0–1	Meruert Kamalidenova
Seo Ji-won	0–1	Dinara Saduakassova
You Ga-ram	0–1	Alua Nurmanova
Uzbekistan	2½–1½	Mongolia
Nilufar Yakubbaeva	0–1	Törmönkhiin Mönkhzul
Umida Omonova	1–0	Batkhuyagiin Möngöntuul
Afruza Khamdamova	1–0	Altan-Ölziin Enkhtuul
Marjona Malikova	½–½	Bayarjargalyn Bayarmaa
United Arab Emirates	0–4	Vietnam
Wafia Al-Maamari	0–1	Phạm Lê Thảo Nguyên
Aisha Al-Muaini	0–1	Nguyễn Thị Thanh An
Moza Al-Mansouri	0–1	Nguyễn Thị Mai Hưng
Anoud Bashkardi	0–1	Hoàng Thị Bảo Trâm
Indonesia	4–0	Thailand
Medina Warda Aulia	1–0	Sarocha Chuemsakul
Dewi Ardhiani Anastasia Citra	1–0	Araya Prommuang
Chelsie Monica Ignesias Sihite	1–0	Melita Buhagiar
Ummi Fisabilillah	1–0	Sirin Bootsumran

=== Round 9 ===
	Score	
China	4–0	United Arab Emirates
Hou Yifan	1–0	Rouda Al-Serkal
Zhu Jiner	1–0	Aisha Al-Muaini
Tan Zhongyi	1–0	Moza Al-Mansouri
Zhai Mo	1–0	Anoud Bashkardi
India	4–0	South Korea
Harika Dronavalli	1–0	Park Sun-woo
Vaishali Rameshbabu	1–0	Kang So-hyun
Vantika Agrawal	1–0	Kim Sa-rang
Savitha Shri Baskar	1–0	You Ga-ram
Kazakhstan	3–1	Uzbekistan
Meruert Kamalidenova	1–0	Nilufar Yakubbaeva
Zhansaya Abdumalik	½–½	Umida Omonova
Dinara Saduakassova	½–½	Afruza Khamdamova
Alua Nurmanova	1–0	Maftuna Bobomurodova
Vietnam	3–1	Mongolia
Phạm Lê Thảo Nguyên	1–0	Törmönkhiin Mönkhzul
Nguyễn Thị Thanh An	½–½	Batkhuyagiin Möngöntuul
Nguyễn Thị Mai Hưng	1–0	Boldbaataryn Altantuyaa
Hoàng Thị Bảo Trâm	½–½	Bayarjargalyn Bayarmaa
Hong Kong	0–4	Indonesia
Eunice Feng	0–1	Irene Kharisma Sukandar
Liu Tian Yi	0–1	Dewi Ardhiani Anastasia Citra
Li Joy Ching	0–1	Chelsie Monica Ignesias Sihite
Leung Hoi Ting	0–1	Ummi Fisabilillah
Thailand	½–3½	Philippines
Sarocha Chuemsakul	½–½	Janelle Mae Frayna
Araya Prommuang	0–1	Marie Antoinette San Diego
Melita Buhagiar	0–1	Bernadette Galas
Sirin Bootsumran	0–1	Shania Mae Mendoza

=== Summary ===
Rank	Team	Round									Total	GP	HH
Rank	Team	1	2	3	4	5	6	7	8	9	Total	GP	HH
1st place, gold medalist(s)	China (CHN)	1	2	2	2	2	2	2	2	2	17	29	
2nd place, silver medalist(s)	India (IND)	2	2	2	0	2	2	1	2	2	15	29	
3rd place, bronze medalist(s)	Kazakhstan (KAZ)	2	0	2	2	0	2	1	2	2	13	26	
4	Vietnam (VIE)	2	0	2	0	2	0	2	2	2	12	23	
5	Indonesia (INA)	2	2	0	1	0	2	0	2	2	11	21½	
6	Uzbekistan (UZB)	1	1	0	2	2	0	2	2	0	10	20½	
7	Philippines (PHI)	0	1	2	1	2	0	2	0	2	10	19	
8	Mongolia (MGL)	2	0	0	2	0	2	2	0	0	8	19	
9	Hong Kong (HKG)	0	2	0	2	0	1	0	0	0	5	9	
10	Thailand (THA)	0	2	0	0	2	0	0	0	0	4	8½	
11	United Arab Emirates (UAE)	0	0	2	0	0	0	0	0	0	2	7½	
12	South Korea (KOR)	0	0	0	0	0	1	0	0	0	1	4	
