= Chess at the 2022 Asian Games – Women's individual rapid =

Women's individual rapid at the 2022 Asian Games
- Venue: Hangzhou Chess Academy
- Date: 24–27 September 2023
- Competitors: 30 from 17 nations

Medalists
gold medal	Zhu Jiner	China
silver medal	Umida Omonova	Uzbekistan
bronze medal	Hou Yifan	China

The women's individual rapid competition at the 2022 Asian Games in Hangzhou was held from 24 September to 27 September 2023 at the Hangzhou Qi-Yuan Hall.

== Schedule ==
All times are China Standard Time (UTC+08:00)

Date	Time	Event
Sunday, 24 September 2023	15:00	Round 1
Sunday, 24 September 2023	17:00	Round 2
Monday, 25 September 2023	15:00	Round 3
Monday, 25 September 2023	17:00	Round 4
Tuesday, 26 September 2023	15:00	Round 5
Tuesday, 26 September 2023	17:00	Round 6
Tuesday, 26 September 2023	19:00	Round 7
Wednesday, 27 September 2023	15:00	Round 8
Wednesday, 27 September 2023	17:00	Round 9

== Results ==
=== Round 1 ===
White	Score	Black
Hou Yifan (CHN)	1–0	Marie Antoinette San Diego (PHI)
Janelle Mae Frayna (PHI)	1–0	Zhansaya Abdumalik (KAZ)
Koneru Humpy (IND)	1–0	Mobina Alinasab (IRI)
Rouda Al-Serkal (UAE)	0–1	Harika Dronavalli (IND)
Bibisara Assaubayeva (KAZ)	1–0	Noshin Anjum (BAN)
Sarocha Chuemsakul (THA)	0–1	Zhu Jiner (CHN)
Irene Kharisma Sukandar (INA)	1–0	Araya Prommuang (THA)
Aisha Al-Khelaifi (QAT)	0–1	Medina Warda Aulia (INA)
Batkhuyagiin Möngöntuul (MGL)	1–0	Seo Ji-won (KOR)
Ghada Al-Khelaifi (QAT)	0–1	Phạm Lê Thảo Nguyên (VIE)
Gong Qianyun (SGP)	1–0	Wafia Al-Maamari (UAE)
Eunice Feng (HKG)	0–1	Törmönkhiin Mönkhzul (MGL)
Nilufar Yakubbaeva (UZB)	1–0	Kim Sa-rang (KOR)
Amenah Al-Awadhi (KUW)	0–1	Umida Omonova (UZB)
Võ Thị Kim Phụng (VIE)	1–0	Liu Tian Yi (HKG)

=== Round 2 ===
White	Score	Black
Batkhuyagiin Möngöntuul (MGL)	0–1	Hou Yifan (CHN)
Phạm Lê Thảo Nguyên (VIE)	0–1	Koneru Humpy (IND)
Harika Dronavalli (IND)	1–0	Gong Qianyun (SGP)
Törmönkhiin Mönkhzul (MGL)	½–½	Bibisara Assaubayeva (KAZ)
Zhu Jiner (CHN)	1–0	Nilufar Yakubbaeva (UZB)
Umida Omonova (UZB)	1–0	Irene Kharisma Sukandar (INA)
Medina Warda Aulia (INA)	½–½	Võ Thị Kim Phụng (VIE)
Marie Antoinette San Diego (PHI)	½–½	Janelle Mae Frayna (PHI)
Zhansaya Abdumalik (KAZ)	1–0	Aisha Al-Khelaifi (QAT)
Mobina Alinasab (IRI)	1–0	Seo Ji-won (KOR)
Kim Sa-rang (KOR)	0–1	Rouda Al-Serkal (UAE)
Noshin Anjum (BAN)	1–0	Ghada Al-Khelaifi (QAT)
Wafia Al-Maamari (UAE)	0–1	Eunice Feng (HKG)
Liu Tian Yi (HKG)	0–1	Sarocha Chuemsakul (THA)
Araya Prommuang (THA)	1–0	Amenah Al-Awadhi (KUW)

=== Round 3 ===
White	Score	Black
Hou Yifan (CHN)	1–0	Harika Dronavalli (IND)
Koneru Humpy (IND)	½–½	Zhu Jiner (CHN)
Bibisara Assaubayeva (KAZ)	1–0	Umida Omonova (UZB)
Janelle Mae Frayna (PHI)	0–1	Medina Warda Aulia (INA)
Võ Thị Kim Phụng (VIE)	1–0	Törmönkhiin Mönkhzul (MGL)
Rouda Al-Serkal (UAE)	0–1	Zhansaya Abdumalik (KAZ)
Irene Kharisma Sukandar (INA)	1–0	Mobina Alinasab (IRI)
Sarocha Chuemsakul (THA)	0–1	Batkhuyagiin Möngöntuul (MGL)
Eunice Feng (HKG)	½–½	Phạm Lê Thảo Nguyên (VIE)
Gong Qianyun (SGP)	1–0	Noshin Anjum (BAN)
Nilufar Yakubbaeva (UZB)	1–0	Araya Prommuang (THA)
Aisha Al-Khelaifi (QAT)	0–1	Marie Antoinette San Diego (PHI)
Amenah Al-Awadhi (KUW)	0–1	Wafia Al-Maamari (UAE)
Seo Ji-won (KOR)	1–0	Kim Sa-rang (KOR)
Ghada Al-Khelaifi (QAT)	0–1	Liu Tian Yi (HKG)

=== Round 4 ===
White	Score	Black
Koneru Humpy (IND)	0–1	Hou Yifan (CHN)
Medina Warda Aulia (INA)	0–1	Bibisara Assaubayeva (KAZ)
Zhu Jiner (CHN)	1–0	Võ Thị Kim Phụng (VIE)
Zhansaya Abdumalik (KAZ)	1–0	Irene Kharisma Sukandar (INA)
Harika Dronavalli (IND)	½–½	Nilufar Yakubbaeva (UZB)
Umida Omonova (UZB)	1–0	Batkhuyagiin Möngöntuul (MGL)
Phạm Lê Thảo Nguyên (VIE)	½–½	Gong Qianyun (SGP)
Törmönkhiin Mönkhzul (MGL)	½–½	Janelle Mae Frayna (PHI)
Marie Antoinette San Diego (PHI)	0–1	Eunice Feng (HKG)
Mobina Alinasab (IRI)	1–0	Sarocha Chuemsakul (THA)
Araya Prommuang (THA)	½–½	Rouda Al-Serkal (UAE)
Noshin Anjum (BAN)	1–0	Seo Ji-won (KOR)
Wafia Al-Maamari (UAE)	1–0	Liu Tian Yi (HKG)
Kim Sa-rang (KOR)	0–1	Aisha Al-Khelaifi (QAT)
Amenah Al-Awadhi (KUW)	0–1	Ghada Al-Khelaifi (QAT)

=== Round 5 ===
White	Score	Black
Hou Yifan (CHN)	0–1	Zhu Jiner (CHN)
Bibisara Assaubayeva (KAZ)	½–½	Zhansaya Abdumalik (KAZ)
Gong Qianyun (SGP)	0–1	Umida Omonova (UZB)
Nilufar Yakubbaeva (UZB)	0–1	Koneru Humpy (IND)
Võ Thị Kim Phụng (VIE)	0–1	Harika Dronavalli (IND)
Eunice Feng (HKG)	0–1	Medina Warda Aulia (INA)
Irene Kharisma Sukandar (INA)	1–0	Noshin Anjum (BAN)
Batkhuyagiin Möngöntuul (MGL)	0–1	Mobina Alinasab (IRI)
Janelle Mae Frayna (PHI)	1–0	Phạm Lê Thảo Nguyên (VIE)
Wafia Al-Maamari (UAE)	0–1	Törmönkhiin Mönkhzul (MGL)
Rouda Al-Serkal (UAE)	1–0	Marie Antoinette San Diego (PHI)
Sarocha Chuemsakul (THA)	1–0	Araya Prommuang (THA)
Liu Tian Yi (HKG)	1–0	Aisha Al-Khelaifi (QAT)
Seo Ji-won (KOR)	1–0	Ghada Al-Khelaifi (QAT)
Kim Sa-rang (KOR)	½–½	Amenah Al-Awadhi (KUW)

=== Round 6 ===
White	Score	Black
Zhu Jiner (CHN)	1–0	Bibisara Assaubayeva (KAZ)
Umida Omonova (UZB)	1–0	Hou Yifan (CHN)
Zhansaya Abdumalik (KAZ)	½–½	Harika Dronavalli (IND)
Medina Warda Aulia (INA)	½–½	Koneru Humpy (IND)
Törmönkhiin Mönkhzul (MGL)	1–0	Irene Kharisma Sukandar (INA)
Mobina Alinasab (IRI)	½–½	Janelle Mae Frayna (PHI)
Võ Thị Kim Phụng (VIE)	½–½	Gong Qianyun (SGP)
Rouda Al-Serkal (UAE)	1–0	Nilufar Yakubbaeva (UZB)
Noshin Anjum (BAN)	0–1	Eunice Feng (HKG)
Liu Tian Yi (HKG)	0–1	Batkhuyagiin Möngöntuul (MGL)
Phạm Lê Thảo Nguyên (VIE)	1–0	Sarocha Chuemsakul (THA)
Seo Ji-won (KOR)	0–1	Wafia Al-Maamari (UAE)
Marie Antoinette San Diego (PHI)	1–0	Araya Prommuang (THA)
Aisha Al-Khelaifi (QAT)	½–½	Amenah Al-Awadhi (KUW)
Ghada Al-Khelaifi (QAT)	0–1	Kim Sa-rang (KOR)

=== Round 7 ===
White	Score	Black
Umida Omonova (UZB)	½–½	Zhu Jiner (CHN)
Hou Yifan (CHN)	1–0	Medina Warda Aulia (INA)
Koneru Humpy (IND)	½–½	Zhansaya Abdumalik (KAZ)
Harika Dronavalli (IND)	½–½	Törmönkhiin Mönkhzul (MGL)
Bibisara Assaubayeva (KAZ)	1–0	Mobina Alinasab (IRI)
Eunice Feng (HKG)	1–0	Rouda Al-Serkal (UAE)
Janelle Mae Frayna (PHI)	0–1	Irene Kharisma Sukandar (INA)
Batkhuyagiin Möngöntuul (MGL)	1–0	Võ Thị Kim Phụng (VIE)
Wafia Al-Maamari (UAE)	0–1	Phạm Lê Thảo Nguyên (VIE)
Gong Qianyun (SGP)	1–0	Marie Antoinette San Diego (PHI)
Nilufar Yakubbaeva (UZB)	1–0	Seo Ji-won (KOR)
Sarocha Chuemsakul (THA)	1–0	Noshin Anjum (BAN)
Amenah Al-Awadhi (KUW)	½–½	Liu Tian Yi (HKG)
Araya Prommuang (THA)	0–1	Kim Sa-rang (KOR)
Ghada Al-Khelaifi (QAT)	½–½	Aisha Al-Khelaifi (QAT)

=== Round 8 ===
White	Score	Black
Zhu Jiner (CHN)	1–0	Eunice Feng (HKG)
Zhansaya Abdumalik (KAZ)	0–1	Umida Omonova (UZB)
Bibisara Assaubayeva (KAZ)	½–½	Hou Yifan (CHN)
Harika Dronavalli (IND)	½–½	Koneru Humpy (IND)
Törmönkhiin Mönkhzul (MGL)	½–½	Medina Warda Aulia (INA)
Irene Kharisma Sukandar (INA)	1–0	Gong Qianyun (SGP)
Phạm Lê Thảo Nguyên (VIE)	1–0	Batkhuyagiin Möngöntuul (MGL)
Mobina Alinasab (IRI)	1–0	Nilufar Yakubbaeva (UZB)
Rouda Al-Serkal (UAE)	0–1	Janelle Mae Frayna (PHI)
Võ Thị Kim Phụng (VIE)	½–½	Wafia Al-Maamari (UAE)
Kim Sa-rang (KOR)	0–1	Sarocha Chuemsakul (THA)
Marie Antoinette San Diego (PHI)	1–0	Liu Tian Yi (HKG)
Aisha Al-Khelaifi (QAT)	0–1	Noshin Anjum (BAN)
Seo Ji-won (KOR)	1–0	Amenah Al-Awadhi (KUW)
Araya Prommuang (THA)	1–0	Ghada Al-Khelaifi (QAT)

=== Round 9 ===
White	Score	Black
Zhu Jiner (CHN)	0–1	Harika Dronavalli (IND)
Umida Omonova (UZB)	0–1	Phạm Lê Thảo Nguyên (VIE)
Hou Yifan (CHN)	1–0	Törmönkhiin Mönkhzul (MGL)
Koneru Humpy (IND)	½–½	Bibisara Assaubayeva (KAZ)
Medina Warda Aulia (INA)	½–½	Irene Kharisma Sukandar (INA)
Mobina Alinasab (IRI)	0–1	Zhansaya Abdumalik (KAZ)
Janelle Mae Frayna (PHI)	1–0	Eunice Feng (HKG)
Gong Qianyun (SGP)	½–½	Sarocha Chuemsakul (THA)
Batkhuyagiin Möngöntuul (MGL)	1–0	Rouda Al-Serkal (UAE)
Nilufar Yakubbaeva (UZB)	0–1	Võ Thị Kim Phụng (VIE)
Marie Antoinette San Diego (PHI)	1–0	Seo Ji-won (KOR)
Wafia Al-Maamari (UAE)	0–1	Ghada Al-Khelaifi (QAT)
Noshin Anjum (BAN)	1–0	Amenah Al-Awadhi (KUW)
Liu Tian Yi (HKG)	0–1	Kim Sa-rang (KOR)
Aisha Al-Khelaifi (QAT)	0–1	Araya Prommuang (THA)

=== Summary ===
Rank	Athlete	Rtg	Round									Total	ARO
Rank	Athlete	Rtg	1	2	3	4	5	6	7	8	9	Total	ARO
1st place, gold medalist(s)	Zhu Jiner (CHN)	2414	1	1	½	1	1	1	½	1	0	7	2280
2nd place, silver medalist(s)	Umida Omonova (UZB)	2183	1	1	0	1	1	1	½	1	0	6½	2398
3rd place, bronze medalist(s)	Hou Yifan (CHN)	2547	1	1	1	1	0	0	1	½	1	6½	2364
4	Harika Dronavalli (IND)	2456	1	1	0	½	1	½	½	½	1	6	2357
5	Bibisara Assaubayeva (KAZ)	2439	1	½	1	1	½	0	1	½	½	6	2342
6	Phạm Lê Thảo Nguyên (VIE)	2337	1	0	½	½	0	1	1	1	1	6	2057
7	Koneru Humpy (IND)	2461	1	1	½	0	1	½	½	½	½	5½	2404
8	Zhansaya Abdumalik (KAZ)	2466	0	1	1	1	½	½	½	0	1	5½	2245
9	Janelle Mae Frayna (PHI)	2105	1	½	0	½	1	½	0	1	1	5½	2233
10	Irene Kharisma Sukandar (INA)	2351	1	0	1	0	1	0	1	1	½	5½	2196
11	Törmönkhiin Mönkhzul (MGL)	2274	1	½	0	½	1	1	½	½	0	5	2275
12	Medina Warda Aulia (INA)	2341	1	½	1	0	1	½	0	½	½	5	2245
13	Batkhuyagiin Möngöntuul (MGL)	2341	1	0	1	0	0	1	1	0	1	5	2064
14	Mobina Alinasab (IRI)	2051	0	1	0	1	1	½	0	1	0	4½	2268
15	Võ Thị Kim Phụng (VIE)	2173	1	½	1	0	0	½	0	½	1	4½	2266
16	Eunice Feng (HKG)	1438	0	1	½	1	0	1	1	0	0	4½	2172
17	Gong Qianyun (SGP)	2285	1	0	1	½	0	½	1	0	½	4½	2159
18	Sarocha Chuemsakul (THA)	1749	0	1	0	0	1	0	1	1	½	4½	2051
19	Marie Antoinette San Diego (PHI)	2126	0	½	1	0	0	1	0	1	1	4½	1891
20	Noshin Anjum (BAN)	1862	0	1	0	1	0	0	0	1	1	4	1871
21	Rouda Al-Serkal (UAE)	1915	0	1	0	½	1	1	0	0	0	3½	2106
22	Nilufar Yakubbaeva (UZB)	2232	1	0	1	½	0	0	1	0	0	3½	2088
23	Wafia Al-Maamari (UAE)	1786	0	0	1	1	0	1	0	½	0	3½	1873
24	Araya Prommuang (THA)	1680	0	1	0	½	0	0	0	1	1	3½	1870
25	Kim Sa-rang (KOR)	1435	0	0	0	0	½	1	1	0	1	3½	1707
26	Seo Ji-won (KOR)	1553	0	0	1	0	1	0	0	1	0	3	1923
27	Liu Tian Yi (HKG)	1065	0	0	1	0	1	0	½	0	0	2½	1845
28	Ghada Al-Khelaifi (QAT)	1547	0	0	0	1	0	0	½	0	1	2½	1704
29	Aisha Al-Khelaifi (QAT)	1606	0	0	0	1	0	½	½	0	0	2	1854
30	Amenah Al-Awadhi (KUW)	1373	0	0	0	0	½	½	½	0	0	1½	1707
