= Chess at the 2025 SEA Games =

- Venue: The Bazaar Hotel Bangkok
- Location: Bangkok, Thailand
- Dates: 10–19 December 2025

Chess competitions at the 2025 SEA Games is taking place at The Bazaar Hotel Bangkok in Chatuchak, Bangkok, from 10 to 19 December 2025.

== Medal table ==
* Host nation (Thailand)

Rank	Nation	Gold	Silver	Bronze	Total
1	Thailand*	5	0	0	5
2	Vietnam	2	3	2	7
3	Indonesia	1	2	4	7
4	Philippines	0	2	5	7
5	Malaysia	0	1	1	2
6	Singapore	0	0	3	3
7	Myanmar	0	0	1	1
Totals (7 entries)		8	8	16	32

== Medalists ==
=== International chess ===
Event	Gold	Silver	Bronze
Men's double rapid	Vietnam; Nguyễn Ngọc Trường Sơn; Bành Gia Huy; Lê Tuấn Minh	Malaysia; Yeoh Li Tian; Poh Yu Tian	Indonesia; Mohamad Ervan; Novendra Priasmoro; Susanto Megaranto
Men's double rapid	Vietnam; Nguyễn Ngọc Trường Sơn; Bành Gia Huy; Lê Tuấn Minh	Malaysia; Yeoh Li Tian; Poh Yu Tian	Singapore; Siddharth Jagadeesh; Kevin Goh Wei Ming; Tin Jingyao
Women's double rapid	Vietnam; Võ Thị Kim Phụng; Bạch Ngọc Thùy Dương; Phạm Lê Thảo Nguyên	Indonesia; Medina Warda Aulia; Irene Kharisma Sukandar; Dewi Ardhiani Anastasia Citra	Malaysia; Tan Li Ting; Puteri Munajjah Az-Zahraa Azhar
Women's double rapid	Vietnam; Võ Thị Kim Phụng; Bạch Ngọc Thùy Dương; Phạm Lê Thảo Nguyên	Indonesia; Medina Warda Aulia; Irene Kharisma Sukandar; Dewi Ardhiani Anastasia Citra	Philippines; Jan Jodilyn Fronda; Ruelle Canino; Janelle Mae Frayna

=== ASEAN chess ===
Event	Gold	Silver	Bronze
Men's team rapid	Thailand; Pairoj Suwan; Tinnakrit Arunnuntapanich; Danuphop Sangsuwan; Worathep Timsri; Warot Kananub	Philippines; Rogelio Antonio Jr. Paulo Bersamina; Jan Emmanuel Garcia; Darwin Laylo; Daniel Quizon	Indonesia; Aditya Bagus Arfan; Gilbert Elroy Tarigan; Satria Duta Cahaya; Azarya Jodi Setyaki; Nayaka Budhidharma
Men's team rapid	Thailand; Pairoj Suwan; Tinnakrit Arunnuntapanich; Danuphop Sangsuwan; Worathep Timsri; Warot Kananub	Philippines; Rogelio Antonio Jr. Paulo Bersamina; Jan Emmanuel Garcia; Darwin Laylo; Daniel Quizon	Singapore; Siddharth Jagadeesh; Kevin Goh Wei Ming; Tin Jingyao; Joel Ngu Yue Zhe; Ashton Chia Yu Zhe
Women's team rapid	Indonesia; Medina Warda Aulia; Chelsie Monica Ignesias Sihite; Irene Kharisma Sukandar; Dewi Ardhiani Anastasia Citra; Laysa Latifah	Vietnam; Đoàn Thị Hồng Nhung; Trần Thị Mộng Thu; Phạm Thanh Phương Thảo; Cao Minh Trang	Philippines; Jan Jodilyn Fronda; Shania Mae Mendoza; Janelle Mae Frayna; Marie Antoinette San Diego; Bernadette Galas
Women's team rapid	Indonesia; Medina Warda Aulia; Chelsie Monica Ignesias Sihite; Irene Kharisma Sukandar; Dewi Ardhiani Anastasia Citra; Laysa Latifah	Vietnam; Đoàn Thị Hồng Nhung; Trần Thị Mộng Thu; Phạm Thanh Phương Thảo; Cao Minh Trang	Myanmar; Khaing Soe Moe; Lwin May Set; Hlaing Su Su; Thu Myo Myo; Lwin May Hsu

=== Makruk chess ===
Event	Gold	Silver	Bronze
Men's triple blitz	Thailand; Tinnakrit Arunnuntapanich; Worathep Timsri; Warot Kananub; Tupfah Khumnorkaew	Indonesia; Mohamad Ervan; Nayaka Budhidharma; Novendra Priasmoro; Susanto Megaranto	Philippines; Jan Emmanuel Garcia; Daniel Quizon; Paulo Bersamina; Darwin Laylo
Men's triple blitz	Thailand; Tinnakrit Arunnuntapanich; Worathep Timsri; Warot Kananub; Tupfah Khumnorkaew	Indonesia; Mohamad Ervan; Nayaka Budhidharma; Novendra Priasmoro; Susanto Megaranto	Vietnam; Vũ Hoàng Gia Bảo; Đào Thiên Hải; Bảo Khoa; Võ Thành Ninh
Men's team rapid	Thailand; Pairoj Suwan; Jongkol Tayang; Worathep Timsri; Boonsueb Saeheng; Wisuwat Teerapabpaisit	Vietnam; Vũ Hoàng Gia Bảo; Đào Thiên Hải; Bảo Khoa; Hoàng Nam Thắng; Võ Thành Ninh	Singapore; Kevin Goh Wei Ming; Andrew Tan Chong Hien; Jarred Jason Neubronner; Jayden Wong Zhenyong; Ashton Chia Yu Zhe
Men's team rapid	Thailand; Pairoj Suwan; Jongkol Tayang; Worathep Timsri; Boonsueb Saeheng; Wisuwat Teerapabpaisit	Vietnam; Vũ Hoàng Gia Bảo; Đào Thiên Hải; Bảo Khoa; Hoàng Nam Thắng; Võ Thành Ninh	Philippines; John Paul Gomez; Paulo Bersamina; Jan Emmanuel Garcia; Darwin Laylo; Daniel Quizon
Men's team double standard	Thailand; Nut Sutthithamwasi; Boonsueb Saeheng; Wisuwat Teerapabpaisit	Philippines; Jan Emmanuel Garcia; Paulo Bersamina	Vietnam; Bảo Khoa; Võ Thành Ninh
Men's team double standard	Thailand; Nut Sutthithamwasi; Boonsueb Saeheng; Wisuwat Teerapabpaisit	Philippines; Jan Emmanuel Garcia; Paulo Bersamina	Indonesia; Mohamad Ervan; Novendra Priasmoro; Susanto Megaranto
Mixed team standard	Thailand; Nut Sutthithamwasi; Boonsueb Saeheng; Wisuwat Teerapabpaisit; Suchart Chaivichit; Siriwan Samphaothong; Warot Kananub	Vietnam; Bảo Khoa; Đào Thiên Hải; Võ Thành Ninh; Vũ Hoàng Gia Bảo; Trần Quốc Dũng; Phạm Thanh Phương Thảo	Indonesia; Medina Warda Aulia; Mohamad Ervan; Novendra Priasmoro; Susanto Megaranto
Mixed team standard	Thailand; Nut Sutthithamwasi; Boonsueb Saeheng; Wisuwat Teerapabpaisit; Suchart Chaivichit; Siriwan Samphaothong; Warot Kananub	Vietnam; Bảo Khoa; Đào Thiên Hải; Võ Thành Ninh; Vũ Hoàng Gia Bảo; Trần Quốc Dũng; Phạm Thanh Phương Thảo	Philippines; Paulo Bersamina; Ruelle Canino; Jan Emmanuel Garcia; John Paul Gomez; Darwin Laylo
