= Savitha Shri Baskar =

Indian chess player (born 2007)

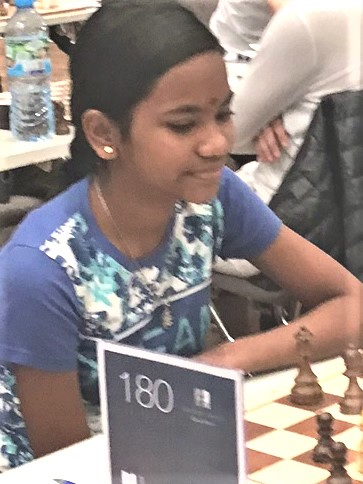
- Savitha Shri in 2019

Personal information
- Born: 25 January 2007 (age 19) Chennai, Tamil Nadu, India

Chess career
- Country: India
- Title: International Master (2025); Woman Grandmaster (2023)
- FIDE rating: 2405 (October 2026)
- Peak rating: 2435 (September 2022)

Savitha Shri Baskar (born 25 January 2007) is an Indian chess player. She achieved the title of Woman Grandmaster in 2023. She achieved the title of International Master in 2025. She won Individual Gold and team bronze in the 46th Chess Olympiad.

She won a bronze medal in the women's tournament in the World Rapid Chess Championship 2022. She won her first Asian Women's Individual Chess Championship in 2026. She was part of the Indian team which won a bronze medal in the FIDE Online Chess Olympiad 2021, and the Indian team which won a silver medal in the women's team event at the 2022 Asian Games.

== Career ==
In December 2022, Savitha won bronze at the Women's World Rapid Chess Championship, as the 36th seed, scoring 8/11 points, following Tan Zhongyi and Dinara Saduakassova at 8½ points, she scored notable wins against Antoaneta Stefanova, Sara Khadem and Bella Khotenashvili among others, and lost only to Tan Zhongyi and Zhansaya Abdumalik.

In December 2025, Savitha finished fourth in the Women's World Rapid Chess Championship with the score of 8/11 points, following top 3 at 8½ points. She entered the tournament as the 67th seed among 141 players.

In June 2026, Savitha won the Asian Women's Individual Chess Championship scoring 7½/9, the same score as second place Afruza Khamdamova but with better tiebreaks. She was trailing Khamdamova by one point after seven rounds, but caught up by winning their round 8 encounter.

In September 2026, Savitha won team bronze and Individual Gold in the Women's section of 46th Chess Olympiad. She started with a perfect score of 7 wins in 7 games then drew two and won one of the remaining games. Savitha scored critical match saving wins in round 8 against silver medalists Kazakhstan and in round 10 against eventual Champions China. She won the gold medal for the 5th board with the performance rating of 2569 and the score of 9/10 (+8=2–0).
