= Chelsie Monica Ignesias Sihite =

Indonesian chess player (born 1995)

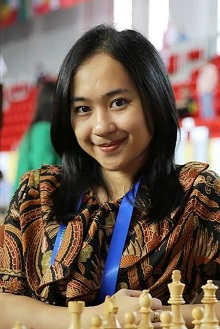
- Sihite at 43rd Chess Olympiad 2018 in Batumi

Personal information
- Born: 2 November 1995 (age 31) Balikpapan, Indonesia

Chess career
- Country: Indonesia
- Title: Woman International Master (2011)
- Peak rating: 2290 (May 2013)

Chelsie Monica Ignesias Sihite (born 2 November 1995) is an Indonesian chess player and Twitch streamer. She received the FIDE title of Woman International Master (WIM) in 2011 and has also represented Indonesia in five chess olympiads (Khanty-Mansiysk 2010, Istanbul 2012, Tromsø 2014, Baku 2016, Batumi 2018).

== Chess career ==
In June 2011, she has earned a Woman International Master title during the 12th ASEAN+ Age Group Chess Championship in Tarakan. She scored 6.5 points (+5 =3 -1), finishing in joint first place with Võ Thi Kim Phung and Zhansaya Abdumalik but placing third on tiebreak points.

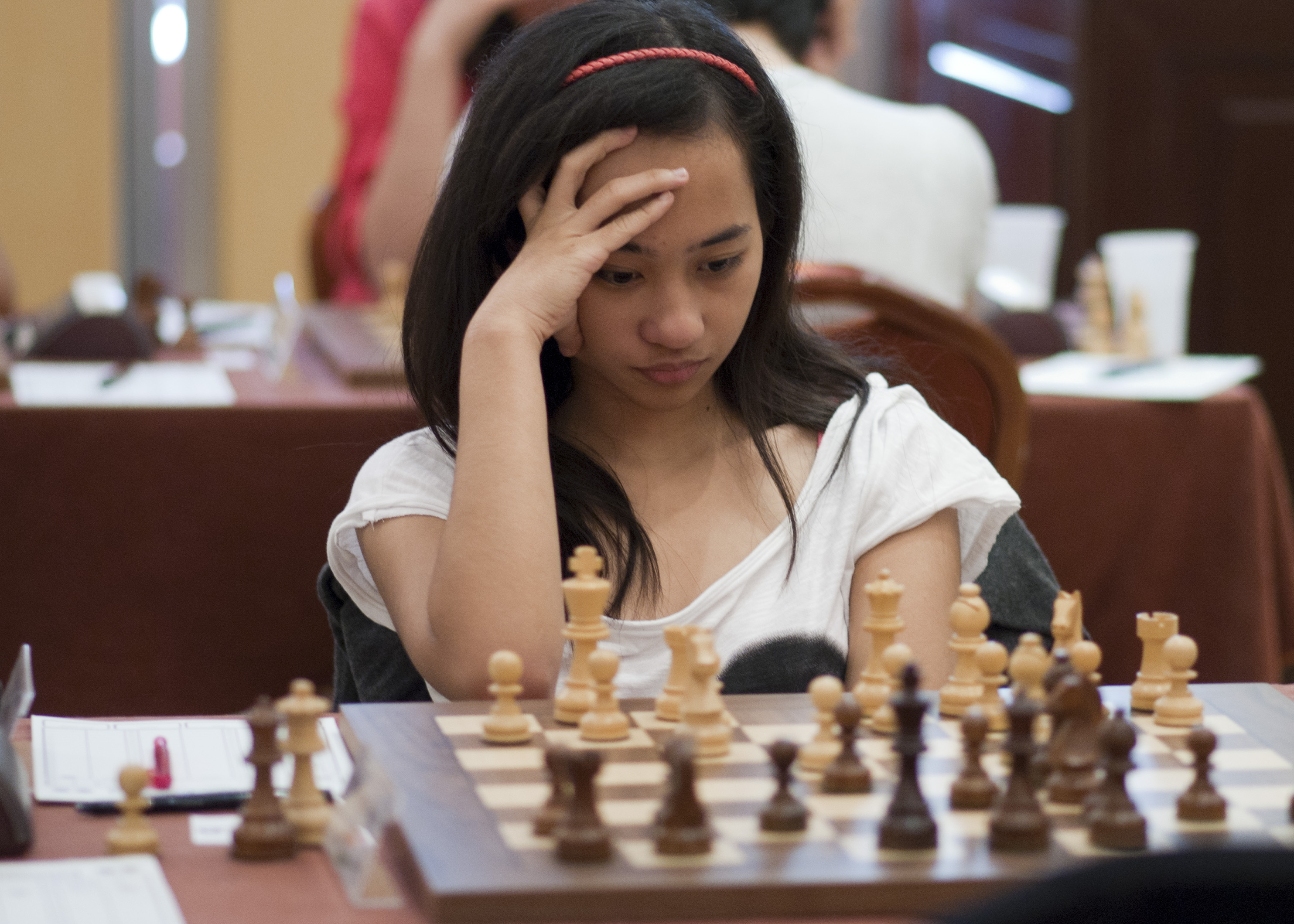
Chelsie while competing in the 2012 World Chess Young Championship

In August 2012, she participated in the World Junior Chess Championship in Athens. She scored 8.5 points (+8 =1 -4), finishing in eighth place, a point behind the winner, Guo Qi.

In September 2012, she has earned her first Woman Grandmaster norm during the 40th Chess Olympiad in Istanbul. She scored 8 points (+7 =2 -1), the third-best individual performance on board two, behind Betul Cemre Yildiz and Irina Krush. The Indonesian national team finished in 24th place.

In November 2015, she has won Indonesia's 45th National Women Chess Championship in Jakarta. She scored 8 points (+6 =4 -0), finishing outright first, half point ahead of Shanti Nur Abidah and Medina Warda Aulia.

In June 2019, she has earned her second Woman Grandmaster norm during the JAPFA Women Grandmaster Chess Tournament in Yogyakarta. She scored 6 points (+3 =6 -1), finishing the tournament in fifth place, a point behind the winner, Lương Phương Hạnh.

In October 2020, she participated in the Asian Nations (Regions) Women Online Cup. She scored 5 points (+5 =0 -4) during the tournament stage and 3.5 points (+3 =1 -2) in the knockout phase. Indonesian National Team finished sixth during the tournament stage and took second place in the knockout phase, losing only to India in the final.

In June 2026, Chelsie famously beat Magnus Carlsen in a simultaneous chess match in Hong Kong, She was his only loss among 25 participants.
