= Olga Babiy =

Ukrainian chess player (born 1989)

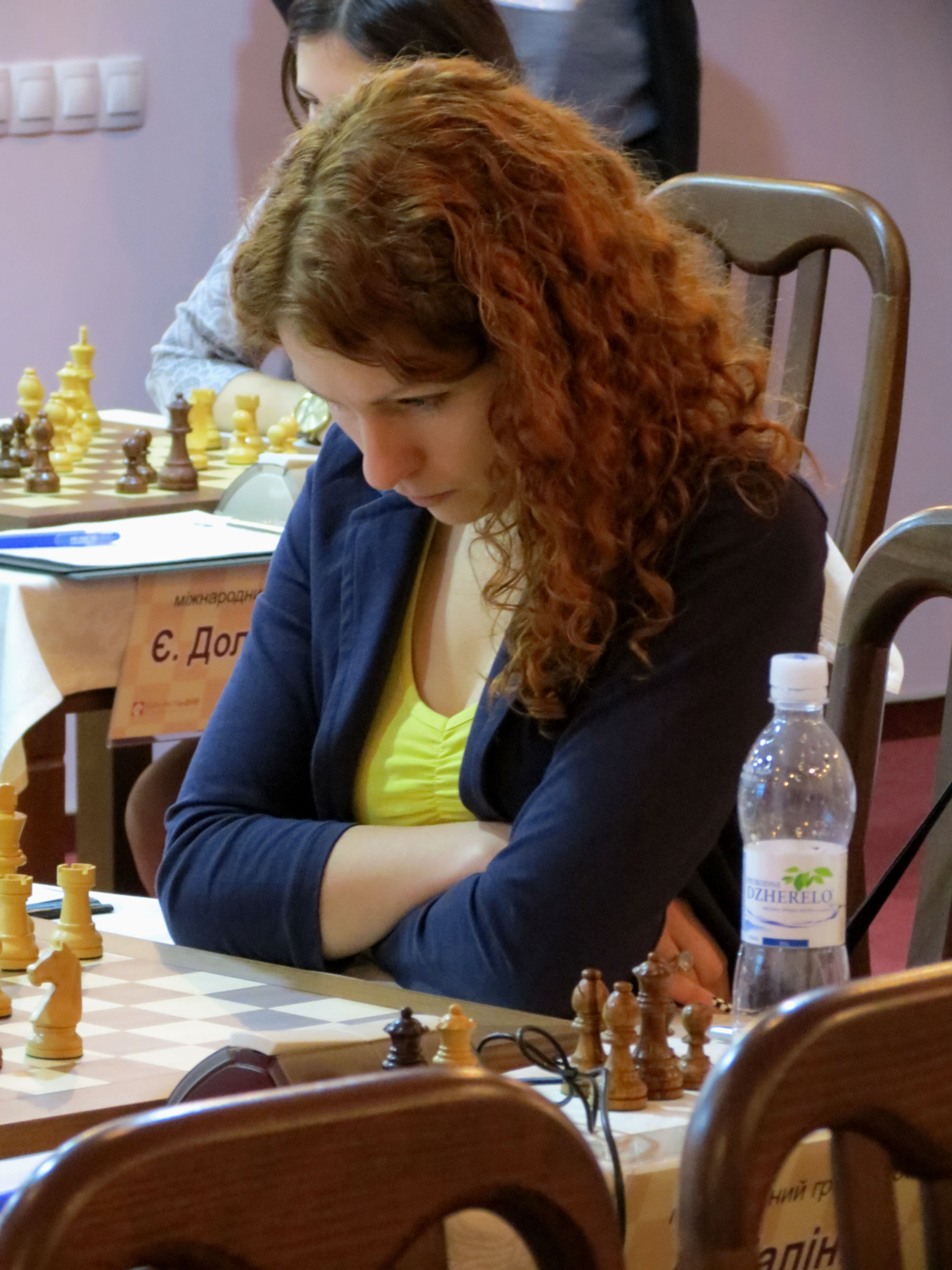
- Babiy in 2008

Personal information
- Full name: Olga Olehivna Babiy (née Kalinina)
- Born: 20 June 1989 (age 37) Ternopil, Ukraine

Chess career
- Country: Ukraine
- Title: Woman Grandmaster (2013)
- Peak rating: 2388 (June 2017)

Olga Olehivna Babiy (Ukrainian: Ольга Олегівна Бабій; born 20 June 1989), née Kalinina (Ukrainian: Калініна), is a Ukrainian chess player who holds the FIDE title of Woman Grandmaster (WGM, 2013).

== Chess career ==
In 2009 she won Ukrainian girls' championship in the age category U20. In the same year in Yevpatoria she won bronze medal in the Ukrainian women's chess championship. In 2011 in Shenzhen she played for Ukrainian student national team in the 2011 Summer Universiade and won team silver medal. In 2015 in Lviv she won silver medal in the Ukrainian women's chess championship.

In 2008, she was awarded the FIDE Woman International Master (WIM) title and received the FIDE Woman Grandmaster (WGM) title five years later.
