= Chess at the 2011 Summer Universiade =

Chess was contested at the 2011 Summer Universiade from August 15 to August 21 at the Meihua Hall of the Shenzhen Conference and Exhibition Center in Shenzhen, China. Men's and women's individual and mixed team competitions were held. It was the first time that chess was included in a Universiade.

== Medal summary ==
=== Medal table ===
Rank	Nation	Gold	Silver	Bronze	Total
1	China (CHN)	3	1	2	6
2	Mongolia (MGL)	0	1	0	1
2	Ukraine (UKR)	0	1	0	1
4	Georgia (GEO)	0	0	1	1
Totals (4 entries)		3	3	3	9

=== Events ===
Event	Gold	Silver	Bronze
Men's individual	Li Chao; China	Wang Hao; China	Wang Yue; China
Women's individual	Tan Zhongyi; China	Batkhuyagiin Möngöntuul; Mongolia	Huang Qian; China
Mixed team	China (CHN); Li Chao; Tan Zhongyi; Wang Hao	Ukraine (UKR); Martyn Kravtsiv; Yuri Vovk; Olha Kalinina	Georgia (GEO); Nino Batsiashvili; Maka Purtseladze; Luka Paichadze
