= Zhansaya Abdumalik =

Kazakhstani chess grandmaster (born 2000)

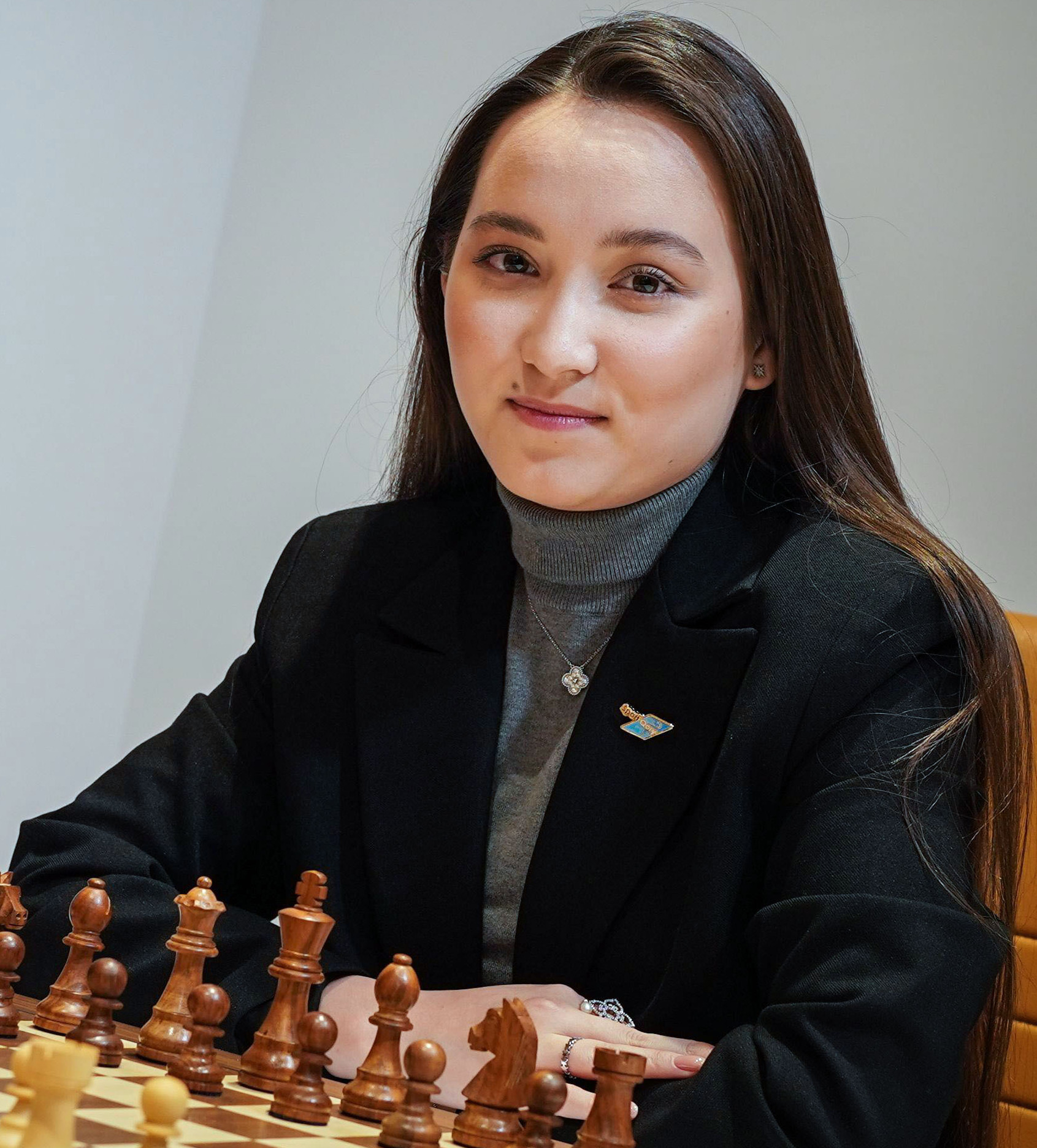
- Abdumalik in 2023

Personal information
- Born: 12 January 2000 (age 26) Almaty, Kazakhstan

Chess career
- Country: Kazakhstan
- Title: Grandmaster (2021)
- FIDE rating: 2468 (August 2026)
- Peak rating: 2507 (October 2021)

Jansaia Daniarqyzy Äbdımälik (Note: Often transliterated as Zhansaya Daniyarovna Abdumalik through a Russified Romanization of Жансая Данияровна Абдумалик.) (Kazakh: Жансая Даниярқызы Әбдімәлік; born 12 January 2000) is a Kazakhstani chess grandmaster. She is the first Kazakhstani woman and the first woman from Central Asia, and the 39th woman overall, to earn the GM title. Abdumalik has a peak FIDE rating of 2505 and has been ranked as high as No. 11 in the world among women. Abdumalik has been a two-time girls' World Youth Champion as well as a girls' World Junior Champion. She is also a two-time Kazakhstani women's national champion, and has represented Kazakhstan in women's events at the Chess Olympiad, World Team Chess Championship, and the Asian Nations Chess Cup. On April 20, 2022, Zhansaya became the President of the Almaty Chess Federation.

Abdumalik began playing chess at age five. She emerged as a chess prodigy, first qualifying for the girls' World Youth Championships at age seven and winning gold medals at the under-8 level at age eight and the under-12 level at age eleven. She earned the Woman Grandmaster (WGM) title at 14 years old in 2014 and the International Master (IM) title at 16 years old in 2016. Having previously earned silver and bronze medals at the under-20 girls' World Junior Championship, she won the gold medal in 2017. After achieving all of her norms for the GM title across 2017 and 2018, Abdumalik became a Grandmaster in 2021 by reaching the 2500 rating threshold in Gibraltar in the last leg of the FIDE Women's Grand Prix 2019–21. She also had a career-best performance rating of 2699 at the tournament. In her career, she has defeated several Grandmasters rated above 2600, including Yaroslav Zherebukh when he was rated 2642 to help earn her first GM norm.

== Early life and background ==
Zhansaya Abdumalik was born on 12 January 2000 to Alma and Daniyar Ashirov in Almaty. Her parents made her last name the same as the first name of her paternal grandfather at his request in large part because he told her parents that she would become famous if they gave her that name. She was taught how to play chess by her father at age five and joined a chess school with her older brother Sanzhar at age six. While her brother switched from chess to track and field after three years, Abdumalik stayed in chess and quickly emerged as a prodigy. She entered her first tournament, Almaty's city championships, the same year she started training at a chess school. In January 2007, she became the under-8 Kazakhstani national champion the same month she turned seven years old. As a result, she qualified for the under-8 girls' division of the World Youth Chess Championships, where she finished in fourth place with a score of 8/11. (Note: 8 points in 11 games. (A win is 1 point, a draw is a ½ point, and a loss is 0 points.)) During 2007, she also began working with Nikolay Peregudov, a Kazakhstani International Master (IM).

A year later, Abdumalik again participated in the under-8 girls' World Youth Championship, this time in Vũng Tàu in Vietnam, and won the gold medal. After a loss in her opening game, she won her final ten games, including victories over Qiyu Zhou, Gunay Mammadzada, and Kelly Wang, who finished in second, third, and fourth place respectively. Her score of 10/11 was 1½ points ahead of Zhou in second place. With this gold medal, she became the first Kazakhstani world champion in chess. Earlier in the year, she had also won the same division of the Asian Youth Chess Championships. After working with Peregudov through 2011, Abdumalik spent a year at the ASEAN Chess Academy in Singapore training with Zhang Zhong, a Singaporean Grandmaster (GM). Back in Kazakhstan, she then was coached for several years by David Arutinian, a Georgian GM, and Vladimir Chuchelov, a Belgian GM who had coached the Dutch national team. When Abdumalik was around 18 years old, she was working with Zahar Efimenko, a Ukrainian GM who was a second to world champion Vladimir Kramnik.

== Chess career ==
=== 2009–2014: Under-12 World Champion, WGM at age 14 ===
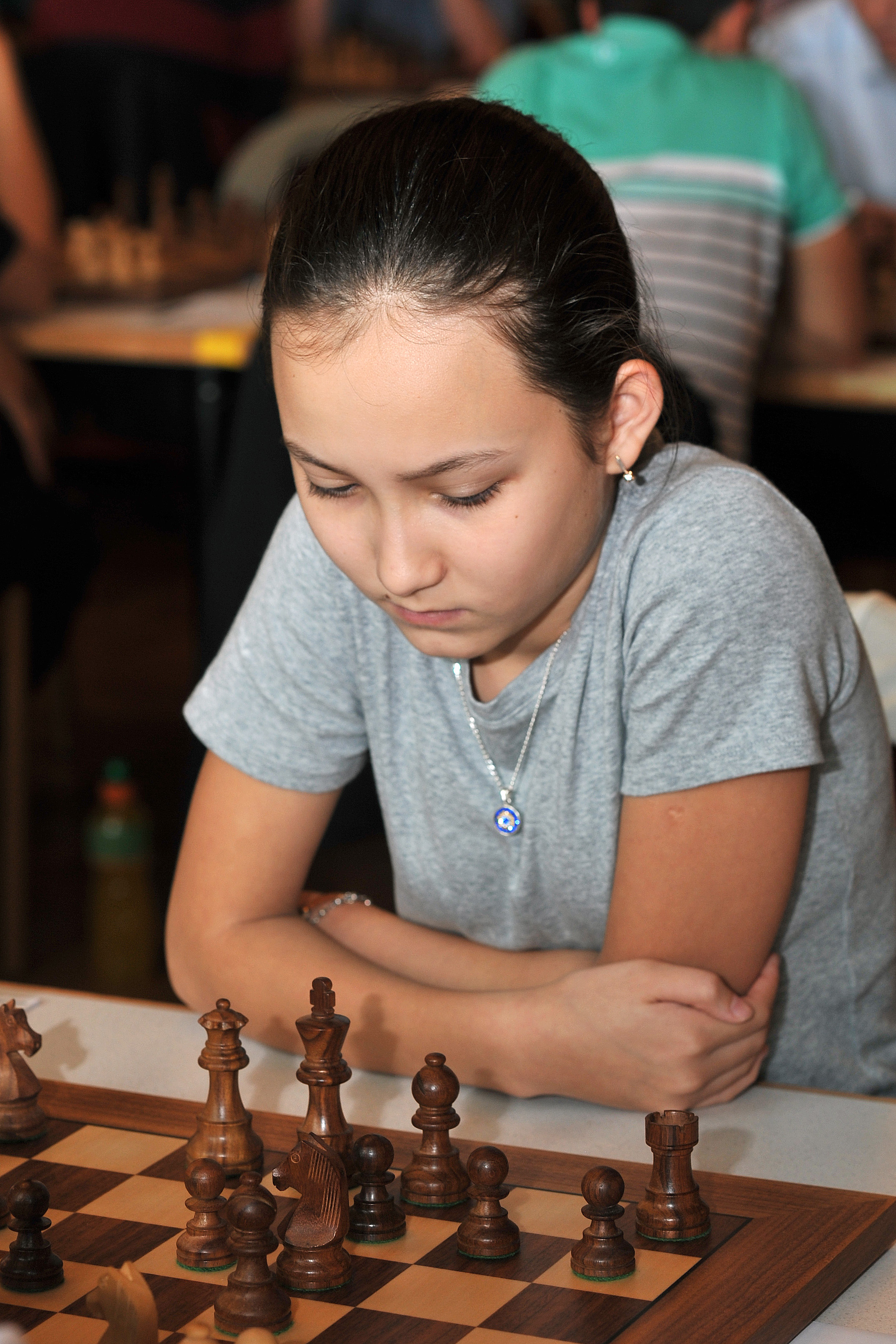
Abdumalik at the 2013 Vienna Open

Abdumalik earned her first FIDE rating in April 2009, starting out at 1854 at age nine. She was directly awarded the Woman FIDE Master (WFM) title at age 10 as a result of her silver medal in the under-10 girls' division at the 2010 World Youth Championship in Greece. A year later, she was directly awarded the Woman International Master (WIM) title as a result of her silver medal in the under-20 girls' division of the 2011 ASEAN+ Age Group Championships in Indonesia. She finished in joint first place at both tournaments, but ended up in second because of the tiebreak criteria. At the World Championships, she tied with the winner Nomin-Erdene Davaademberel with a score of 9/11, a point ahead of third place. At the ASEAN Championships, she scored 6½/9 to tie with the winner Võ Thị Kim Phụng and the bronze medallist Chelsie Monica Ignesias Sihite.

During 2011, Abdumalik also reached milestone ratings of 2000 and 2100 for the first time. Her earliest tournament that counted towards her rating in 2011 was the 2010 World Chess Tour IM tournament in Moscow, where she gained 62 rating points. Although she entered the tournament with a rating of 1870, she scored 5½/12 against much higher-rated opponents, including five draws against five International Masters and a win against Pavel Rozanov, a FIDE Master (FM) rated 2297. A series of large rating jumps culminated in Abdumalik winning her second World Championship title at the end of the year, this time in Brazil in the under-12 girls' division. She scored 8/9, a full point ahead of second place. In addition to her second World Championship, she also won the under-11 girls' division of the World School Chess Championship for the second year in a row earlier in the year. Abdumalik came close to defending her under-12 World Championship the following year in 2012, but finished in joint second place. She scored 8½/11, a ½ point behind the winner, Vaishali Rameshbabu, the only player she lost to during the event. She also participated in the under-20 girls' World Junior Chess Championships that year for the first time, scoring 7/13. Outside of the world championships, Abdumalik earned her first Woman Grandmaster (WGM) norm at the Alushta summer tournament in Ukraine, where she scored 7/11 and was undefeated against players with an average rating of 2282.

During 2013, Abdumalik crossed ratings of 2200 and 2300 for the first time. She entered the Kazakhstani women's national championship and finished runner-up to Guliskhan Nakhbayeva, who won on the tiebreak criteria after they both scored 7/9. She also entered the open section of the under-20 junior national championship and won both the rapid and blitz events. Later in the year, Abdumalik had a breakthrough at the World Junior Championships in Turkey. She won the silver medal as a 13-year-old with a score of 9½/13, a point behind only Aleksandra Goryachkina, one of the two players she lost to in the event. Among the players Abdumalik defeated in the event was Deysi Cori, a WGM rated 2433. With this achievement, she earned her second WGM norm and was later named the Best Girl Under-20 at the 1st Annual Asian Chess Excellence Awards. Late in the year, Abudmalik had another big achievement, winning the Brno Open in the Czech Republic as the sixth-highest rated player in the event. She scored 7½/9, a full point ahead of the two highest-rated players, Toms Kantāns and Vojtěch Plát, who came in joint second with several others. Abdumalik began 2014 by achieving her final WGM norm at the Gibraltar Chess Festival in February. She scored 5½/10 against opponents with an average rating of 2366, notably defeating Felipe El Debs, a GM rated 2520. As she had already reached the 2300 rating threshold, she earned the WGM title less than a month after turning 14 years old. She had another successful result in speed chess later in the year, winning the bronze medal in 2014 Asian Women's Blitz Championship behind gold medallist Tan Zhongyi and silver medallist Dronavalli Harika. Her career-best rating during the year was 2379.

=== 2015–2016: International Master title ===
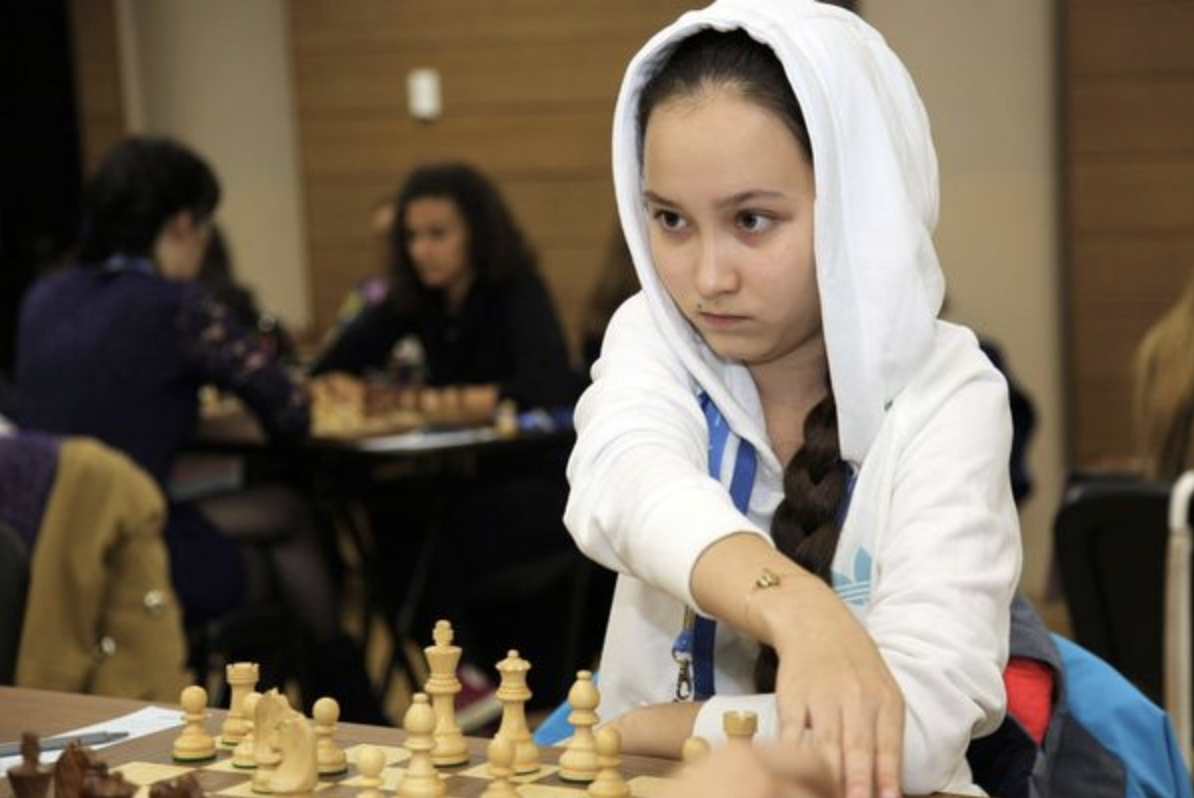
Abdumalik at the 2015 World Junior Championships, where she won a bronze medal

Abdumalik satisfied her first two requirements for the IM title in 2015, securing her first IM norm at the Reykjavik Open, which in turn also helped her reach the 2400 rating threshold needed for the title. During the tournament, she defeated two Icelandic GMs, Henrik Danielsen and Héðinn Steingrímsson, and won six games in total as part of a 6½/10 overall score. Towards the end of the year, Abdumalik scored 9½/13 for the second time in three years at the World Junior Championships, which were held in Khanty-Mansiysk in Russia. With this performance, she won the bronze medal, having tied with silver medallist Alina Bivol and finishing a ½ point behind the winner Nataliya Buksa. Although she lost two games, including one to Bivol, she was the only player to defeat Buksa.

Abdumalik completed her two remaining requirements for the IM title in 2016. She earned her second IM norm at the Women's Asian Nations Cup with a 5½/7 start to the tournament. She followed this up by winning her first Kazakhstani women's national championship towards the middle of the year. As the top seed, she again scored 7/9, this time a ½ point ahead of Yelena Ankudinova in second place. At the end of the year, she also won the Krystyna Hołuj-Radzikowska Memorial tournament for her third and final IM norm. She scored 7/9 against opponents with an average rating of 2403, a ½ point ahead of second-place finisher Anastasia Bodnaruk. Overall, she compiled a performance rating of 2623, having scored 1½ points above what was needed for the IM norm. (Note: Although this performance rating would normally also qualify for a GM norm, it did not in this case because Abdumalik's opponents did not include three GMs, one of the other requirements.) With this performance, she became an International Master at age 16, about a month before turning 17. Back in speed chess, Abdumalik played the Women's World Rapid and Blitz Chess Championships, finishing in sixth place in the World Rapid event.

=== 2017–2021: World Junior Champion, Grandmaster title ===
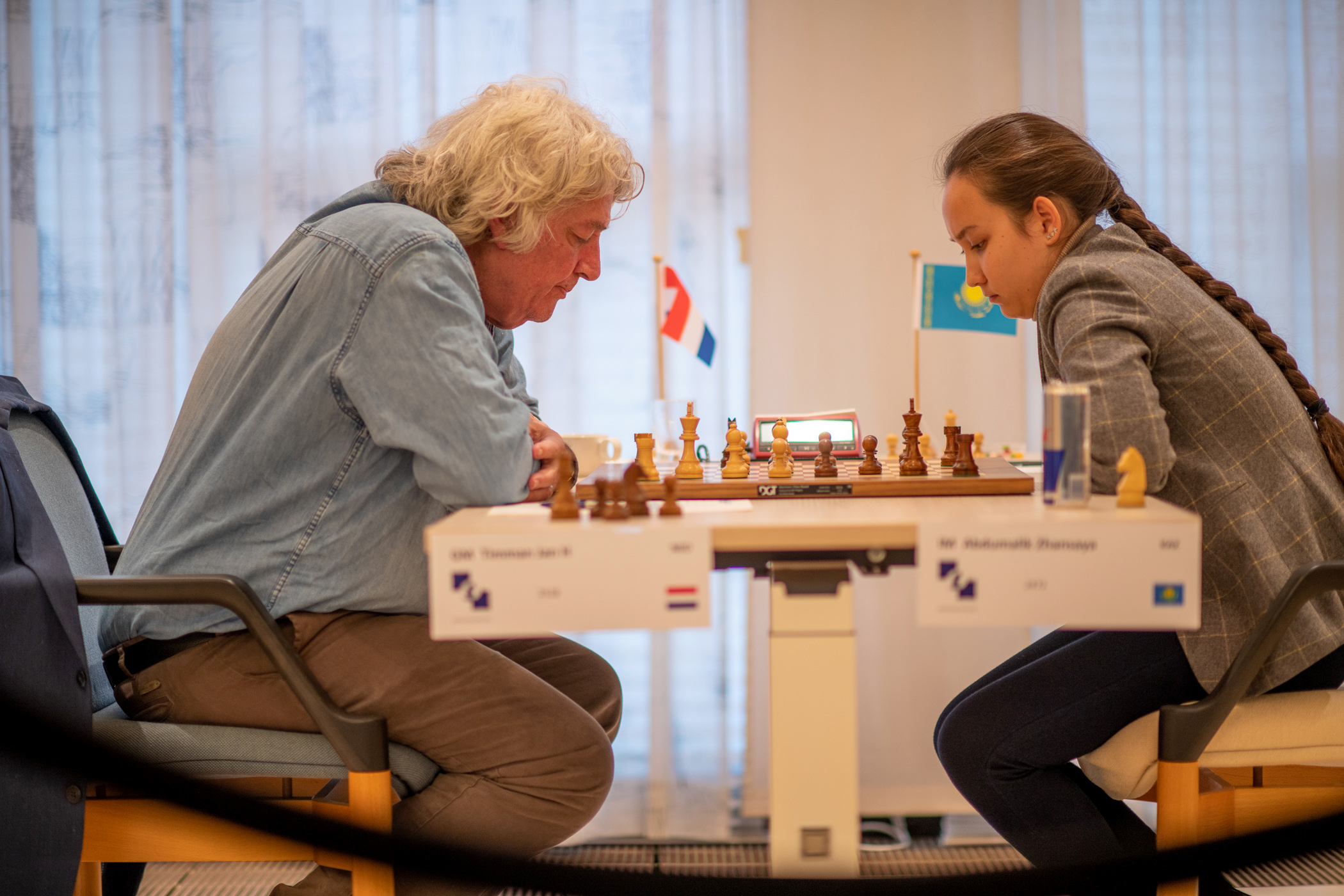
Abdumalik vs Jan Timman at the 2019 Hoogeveen Open

Abdumalik maintained a rating in the low 2400s throughout nearly all of 2017. Although only the 42nd highest-ranked player in a field of 118 at the Aeroflot Open B, she finished in 15th place, one point behind the winner. After she lost rating points in the middle of year, in part from a third-place finish at the Kazakhstani women's national championship, Abdumalik recovered by earning her first GM norm at the World Open in the United States. She scored 7/9 to finish in equal second place and won the prize for the top finisher among players rated between 2300 and 2449 by a full point. She faced six GMs and defeated three of them, including Yaroslav Zherebukh, who was rated 2642 and remains the highest-rated player she has ever defeated. Her performance rating for the tournament was 2650. Abdumalik closed out the year by winning the World Junior Championship in Italy. As the top seed, she finished a point ahead of second place with 9½/11, clinching the gold medal in the last round with a win against Jennifer Yu. At the Women's World Rapid and Blitz Championships at the very end of the year, Abdumalik had another top ten finish, coming in eighth place in the World Blitz event out of 100 participants behind only GMs.

The following year, Abdumalik earned her final two GM norms in succession at the Karpos Open in March and the Budapest Spring Festival in April. She scored 7/9 at the former event to finish in fifth place. At the latter event, she was in contention for first place after starting with a score of 6/7 and defeating Tamás Bánusz, a GM rated 2617, but lost her last two games. With all three norms, she only needed to reach a rating of 2500 to earn the GM title. She came close to reaching 2500 at her next tournament, the Open Internacional Llucmajor in Spain. Having started the event with a rating of 2484, she peaked at an unpublished rating of 2496.5 in the middle of the event before losing her next two games, the first to G.A. Stany. Later in 2018, Abdumalik entered her first Women's World Chess Championship, which was played as a 64-player knockout tournament at the time. As the 15th seed, she made it to the quarterfinals. All four of her matches went to tiebreaks. Abdumalik won the first three matches against 50th seed Padmini Rout, 18th seed Zhao Xue, and 31st seed Jolanta Zawadzka in the first set of tiebreaks, played in a 25+10 rapid format. (Note: 25 minutes, plus 10 additional seconds with each move) She then was eliminated by 7th seed Mariya Muzychuk. Both players each won once in the two-game classical match, the 25+10 rapid pair, and the 10+10 rapid pair before Muzychuk advanced by winning their first blitz game and drawing the other.

Abdumalik continued to maintain a rating in the high 2400s through 2019 and 2020. She was the youngest player invited to participate in the inaugural Cairns Cup, a round-robin tournament for ten of the world's leading women's players. She finished in the middle of the field with an even score of 4½/9. Although Abdumalik defeated M. Amin Tabatabaei, a GM rated 2638, at the Gibraltar Chess Festival in early 2020, her rating dropped to 2461 a month later after a poor result at the Aeroflot Open A. In March 2020, Abdumalik was invited to participate in the third leg of the FIDE Women's Grand Prix 2019–21 at Lausanne as a replacement player after Zhao Xue needed to withdraw due to the onset of the COVID-19 pandemic. She had good results at the tournament, finishing third place out of twelve players with 6/11 and regaining 17 rating points to get back to a rating of 2478.

Because of the pandemic, Abdumalik did not play another tournament until the women's national championship at the end of the year, which she won, albeit while falling to a rating of 2472. She entered her next tournament, the fourth leg of the FIDE Women's Grand Prix in Gibraltar, needing 28 rating points to meet the threshold for the Grandmaster title. She won the tournament with a score of 8½/11, clinching victory with a draw in the penultimate round and finishing in clear first by 1½ points. She also gained 33 points, and first reached a rating of 2500 after her ninth round win against Valentina Gunina, a game that lasted 133 moves and over six hours in which Gunina continued to play on in spite of the position being dead-drawn for a long period of time. With this win, she qualified for the Grandmaster title at age 21. Overall, she had a performance rating of 2699 at the tournament. She also reached a career-best women's ranking of No. 11 in the world.

On May 30, 2022, Abdumalik became the champion of the Women's Bundesliga in chess, having won an early victory with the OSG Baden-Baden team.

== National representation ==
Abdumalik has represented Kazakhstan at three Women's Chess Olympiads. She made her debut at the 2014 Tromsø Olympiad in Norway on the third board, behind Guliskhan Nakhbayeva and Dinara Saduakassova, and ahead of Madina Davletbayeva and Gulmira Dauletova. Although Kazakhstan was only the 17th best out of 136 teams by average rating, they finished in sixth place primarily on the strength of the performances by Saduakassova and Dauletova as the team scored 17 points (+8–2=1). (Note: 8 wins, 2 losses, 1 draw) Abdumalik had an even score of 4½/9, and had the team's only win against Eesha Karavade in their third round draw against the higher-rated team from India. Although Abdumalik fared better at the 2016 Baku Olympiad, Kazakhstan did not have as good of a result. The team finished in 37th with 13 points (+6–4=1), below their starting rank of 31st. With Nakhbayeva and Saduakassova both absent, Abdumalik played on the top board ahead of Dauletova, Sholpan Zhylkaidarova, Yelena Ankudinova, and Aisezym Mukhit. She scored 6/10. At the 2018 Batumi Olympiad, Kazakhstan finished in 11th place with 16 points (+6–1=4), close to their starting rank of 8th. They were the only team to beat the host country of Georgia's top team, who won the bronze medal. Abdumalik played on the second board behind Saduakassova and ahead of Nakhbayeva, Dauletova, and Assel Serikbay. She scored the best on the team with 7½/11 and had one of her team's wins against Georgia, albeit still while losing rating points overall.

Abdumalik has been a member of two of Kazakhstan's Women's World Team Chess Championship teams and three Women's Asian Nations Cup teams. She played on the top board both times at the former event but did not fare well in either occasion, scoring 1½/8 in 2015 and 3½/8 in 2019, losing rating points in both instances. Abdumalik has had better results at the Women's Asian Nations Cup. After a poor performance in her first appearance in 2014, she scored 5½/8 in 2016 to score her second IM norm. She clinched the norm with a 5½/7 start highlighted by a win against Batkhuyag Munguntuul, a Mongolian WGM. Her team also won the bronze medal behind China and Uzbekistan, and she individually won a silver medal on the second board. Although her team did not fare as well in 2018, she still had a good performance with a score of 4½/6.

== Playing style ==
Abdumalik has a strong preference for playing 1.e4 (the King's Pawn Game) with the white pieces compared to other opening moves. With the black pieces, she commonly defends against 1.e4 with the Sicilian defence (1.e4 c5), and commonly defends against 1.d4 (the Queen's Pawn Game) with the Grünfeld Defence (1.d4 Nf6 2.c4 g6 3.Nc3 d5).

== Personal life ==
Abdumalik has been a student at the Innovative Technical College in Almaty, where she has studied computer programming.

Abdumalik and her parents opened the Zhansaya Abdumalik Chess Academy in 2014. The academy has grown to have three branches with over 700 students in total. Former World Champion Anatoly Karpov attended the opening of the academy, where he and Abdumalik played a four-game speed chess match. While Karpov won both rapid games, Abdumalik won one of the blitz games and drew the other.

Outside of chess, one of Abdumalik's hobbies is boxing. She also likes fishing, and previously had swimming as a hobby when she was growing up.

== Notable games ==
Zherebukh – Abdumalik, 2017

Position: g1 white king, f1 white bishop, e1 white rook, d1 white rook, h2 white pawn, g2 white pawn, d2 white knight, c2 white queen, a2 white pawn, e3 white pawn, c3 white pawn, h4 white bishop, f4 white pawn, c4 white pawn, f5 black pawn, c5 black pawn, a5 black knight, g6 black pawn, e6 black bishop, d6 black pawn, b6 black pawn, h7 black pawn, g7 black bishop, f7 black queen, a7 black pawn, h8 black king, f8 black rook, e8 black rook

Position after 18. Qd3 Qc6 19. Qc2 Qc7 20. f4 Qf7

Position: f1 white bishop, h2 white pawn, b2 white rook, a2 white pawn, h3 white king, g3 white pawn, a3 black rook, f4 white pawn, d4 black knight, c4 white pawn, f5 black pawn, c5 black pawn, h6 black pawn, g6 black pawn, e6 black rook, b6 black pawn, a6 black pawn, b7 white rook, h8 black king

Position after 34. Rb2 Re6 35. Kg2 h6 36. Kh3

- Yaroslav Zherebukh (2642) – Zhansaya Abdumalik (2397), 2017 World Open: Round 8; Torre Attack, 0–1. Annotations from National Master (NM) Sam Copeland, a chess journalist and one of the competitors in the event, are included below.

1. d4 Nf6 2. Nf3 g6 3. Bg5 Bg7 4. e3 d6 5. Be2 O-O 6. c4 Ne4 7. Bh4 c5 8. O-O Nc6 9. Nc3 Nxc3 10. bxc3 Qc7 11. d5 ["Right or wrong, I've personally never liked these kinds of advances. White's structure has no flexibility any more."] 11... Na5 12. Qc2 e5 13. dxe6?! ["The engine already likes Black after this, but maybe Black was already better? ...f5 is coming, and Black's position looks nice if White declines to capture."] 13... Bxe6 14. Nd2 f5 15. Rad1 Rae8 ["As a Dutch player, Black's position is an ideal fantasy for me. :)"] 16. Rfe1 Kh8 17. Bf1 b6 18. Qd3 Qc6 19. Qc2 Qc7 20. f4 Qf7 ["Black makes an instructive re-maneuver. After Zherebukh denied her Qa4, Black reroutes the queen to the more flexible f7."] 21. Qd3 d5 22. cxd5 Bxd5 23. c4 Be4? ["(23... Bc6! looked stronger according to the engine. Logically, permitting the exchange of the Nd2 for the light-squared bishop is a concession.)"] 24. Nxe4 Rxe4 25. Qd7 Bc3 26. Re2 Bf6 27. Qxf7 ["(27. Bxf6+! Qxf6 28. Qxa7 Nxc4 29. Rd7 still has play, but White would be happy to get here.)"] 27... Rxf7 28. Bxf6+ Rxf6 29. Red2 Rxe3 30. Rd7 Nc6 31. g3 a6 32. Rb7 Nd4 33. Rb1 Ra3 34. Rb2 Re6 35. Kg2 h6 36. Kh3 g5 37. Bg2? ["Zherebukh misses Abdumalik's next move."] 37... Ne2! ["...Ng1# and ...Nf4# are threatened. Zherebukh is completely busted."] 0–1
