= Umida Omonova =

Uzbekistani chess player (born 2006)

- Omonova at the 46th Chess Olympiad

Personal information
- Born: 25 April 2006 (age 20)

Chess career
- Country: Uzbekistan
- Title: Woman Grandmaster (2026)
- Peak rating: 2358 (April 2026)

Umida Omonova (born 25 April 2006) is an Uzbekistani chess player. She was awarded the title of Woman Grandmaster in 2026.

== Career ==
In 2018, Omonova finished second in the World Cadets Chess Championships 2018 U12 Girls.

She finished second in the 2021 Women's Uzbekistani Chess Championship losing out to Nilufar Yakubbaeva on tiebreaks after both finished on 8½/10.

She qualified for the Women's Chess World Cup 2021, where she was defeated 1½-½ by Batkhuyagiin Möngöntuul in the first round.
