= Alua Nurman =

Kazakhstani chess player (born 2007)

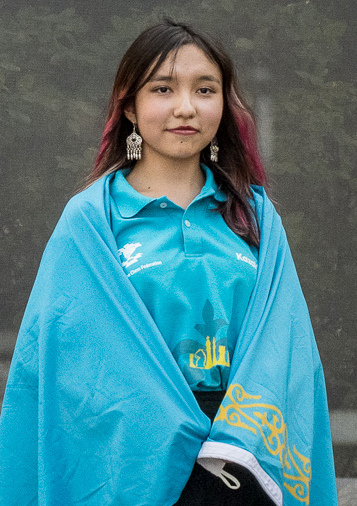
- Nurman in 2023

Personal information
- Born: Alua Nurmanova; 25 April 2007 (age 19) Almaty, Kazakhstan

Chess career
- Country: Kazakhstan
- Title: International Master (2026); Woman Grandmaster (2024)
- FIDE rating: 2460 (October 2026)
- Peak rating: 2460 (October 2026)

Alua Nūrman (née Nurmanova; Kazakh: Алуа Ернарқызы Нұрман; born 25 April 2007) is a Kazakhstani chess player who holds the title of International Master (IM). As a member of the Kazakhstan women's national team, she is a Women's Olympiad silver medallist in 2024 and 2026 editions and a Women's World Team Championship silver medallist in 2023.

== Chess career ==
Alua won the Kazakhstani Youth Chess Championship in various age groups: 2020 (girls U14 age group) and 2022 (girls U16 age group). In 2018 she won World School Chess Championship in U11 girls age group. In 2019 in Asian Youth Chess Championship she won two medals in girls U12 age group: gold in blitz and bronze in classical chess.

Alua finished second in the Kazakhstani Women's Chess Championship in 2022.

Alua played for Kazakhstan in the Women's Chess Olympiad:

- In 2026, Board 2 in the Women's event of the 46th Chess Olympiad won team Silver scoring 7/10 (+5-1=4), defeated Vaishali Rameshbabu in round 8.
- In 2024, Board 4 in the Women's event at the 45th Chess Olympiad scoring 7/10 (+6=2-2) and won team silver medal.

Alua played for Kazakhstan in the World Women's Team Chess Championships:

- In 2023, at fourth board in the 9th Women's World Team Chess Championship in Bydgoszcz (+1=2-1) and won team silver medal.

In 2022, she was awarded the FIDE Women International Master (WIM) title and received the FIDE Women Grandmaster (WGM) title two years later.

In 2026, she was awarded the FIDE International Master (IM) title.
