= Jan Emmanuel Garcia =

Filipino chess player (born 1995)

Personal information
- Born: August 7, 1995 (age 31) Manila, Philippines

Chess career
- Country: Philippines
- Title: International Master (2011)
- FIDE rating: 2455 (October 2026)
- Peak rating: 2455 (October 2026)

Jan Emmanuel Garcia is a Filipino chess player.

== Chess career ==
In May 2026, he won the Philippine Men's National Team Selection for the ASEAN E-Sports Chess Championship.

In July 2026, he won the Philippine Chess Championship with an undefeated score of 9.5/13 ahead of Darwin Laylo and Michael Concio.

In August 2026, he and teammate Marc Christian Nazario won the WR Bughouse Chess Open tournament at the MICE Center in Quezon City.

In September 2026, he played for the Philippines in the 46th Chess Olympiad, where he went undefeated and held draws against grandmasters Eltaj Safarli, Fernando Peralta, Khumoyun Begmuratov, and Aksel Bu Kvaløy.

== Personal life ==
He graduated from the Ateneo de Manila University with a bachelor of science in management information systems, and serves as the program manager of the university's chess team.
