= Mobina Alinasab =

Iranian chess player (born 2000)

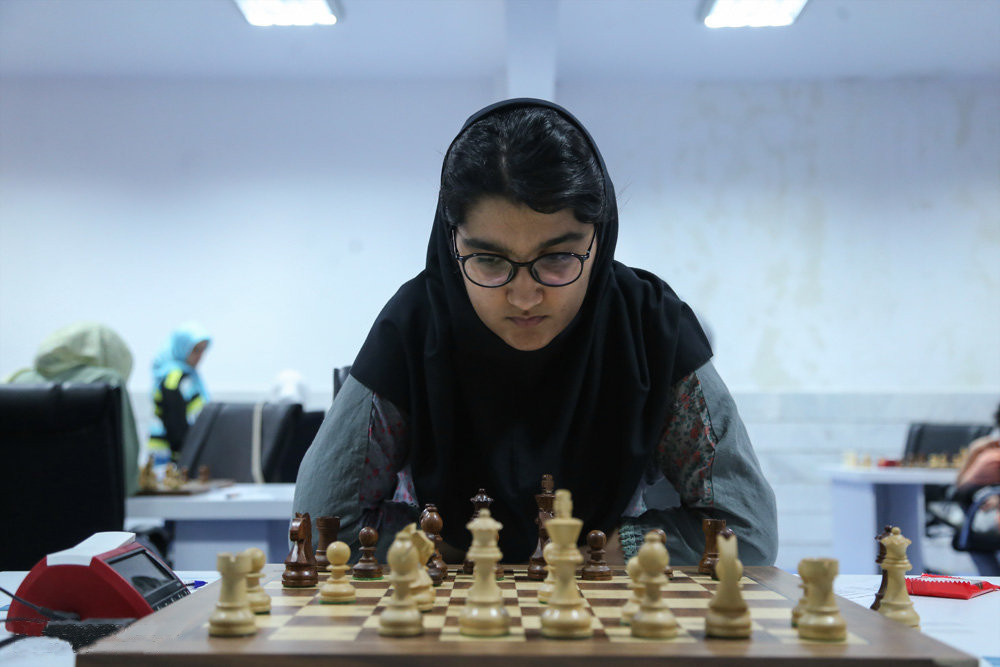
- Alinasab in 2017

Personal information
- Born: 7 August 2000 (age 25)

Chess career
- Country: Iran
- Title: Woman Grandmaster (2022)
- Peak rating: 2373 (May 2022)

Mobina Alinasab (Persian: مبینا علی‌نسب; born 7 August 2000), is an Iranian chess player who holds the title of Woman Grandmaster.

== Biography ==
In 2016, Mobina Alinasab won the Asian Youth Chess Championship and won 2nd place in the World Youth Chess Championship girls U16 age group.

In 2017, Mobina Alinasab won the Iranian Women's Chess Championship. In 2017, she won the Women's World Chess Championship Asian Zonal 3.1 tournament, which qualified her for the Women's World Chess Championship 2018 (November).

Mobina Alinasab played for Iran in the Women's Chess Olympiads:

- In 2018, at third board in the 43rd Chess Olympiad (women) in Batumi (+6 =4 -1).

In 2017, she was awarded the FIDE Woman International Master (WIM) title.
