= Mohamad Ervan =

Indonesian chess player (born 1992)

Personal information
- Born: May 15, 1992 (age 34)

Chess career
- Country: Indonesia
- Title: International Master (2019)
- Peak rating: 2404 (March 2023)

Mohamad Ervan (born 1992) is an Indonesian chess player. He was awarded the title of International Master in 2019.

== Chess career ==
Ervan won the Indonesian Chess Championship in 2018.

After his sixth-place performance in the 2021 Asian Individual Hybrid Chess Championships, where he was seeded 36th, he qualified for the Chess World Cup 2021 where he was drawn against Nodirbek Abdusattorov in the first round. He was defeated in their first game, but failed a COVID-19 test before their second game, handing the tie to his opponent by walkover.
