= Irene Kharisma Sukandar =

Indonesian chess player (born 1992)

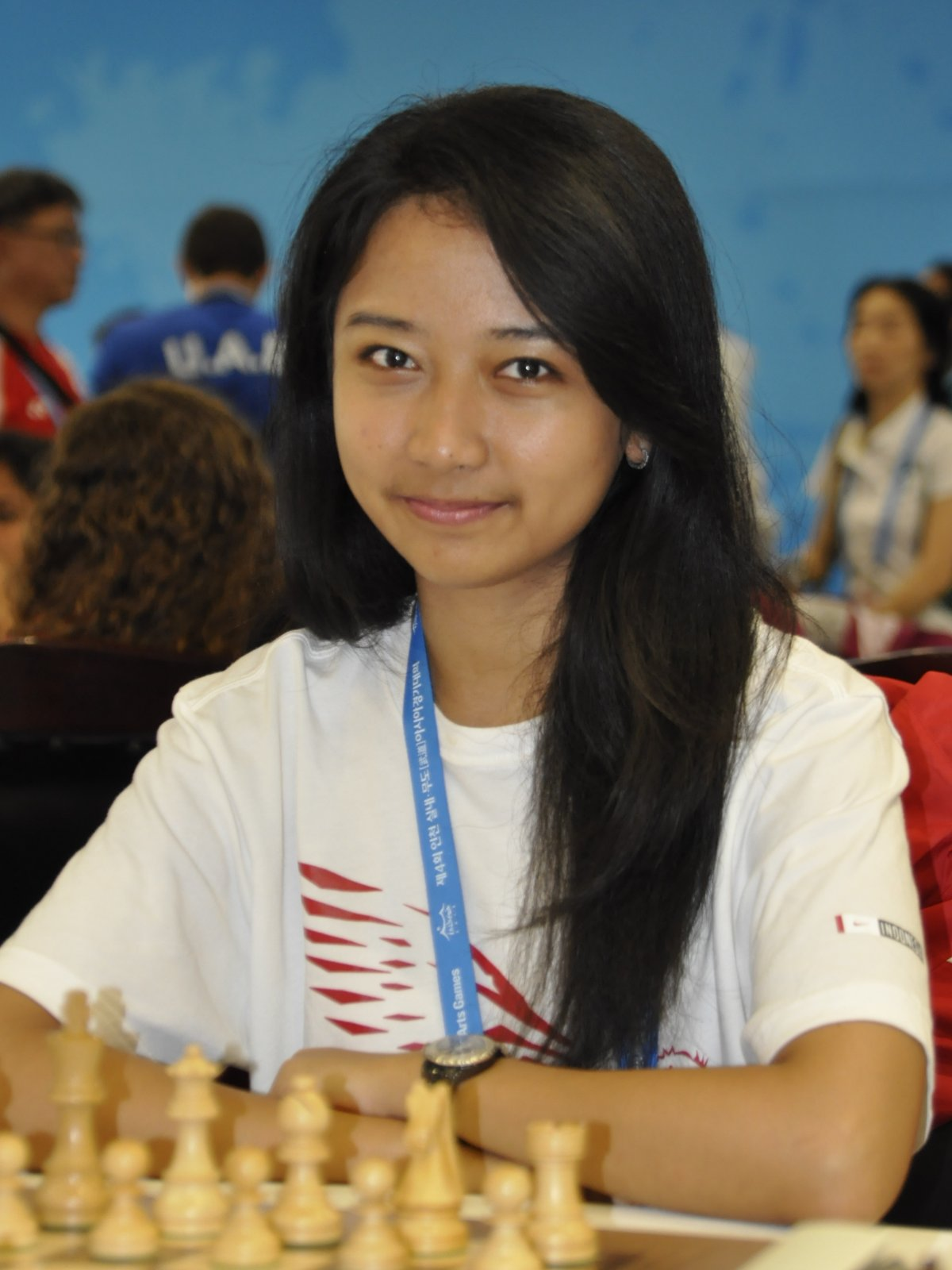
- Sukandar at the 2013 Asian Indoor Games

Personal information
- Born: 7 April 1992 (age 34) Jakarta, Indonesia
- Spouse: Eric Rosen (m. 2025)

Chess career
- Country: Indonesia
- Title: International Master (2014); Woman Grandmaster (2009)
- FIDE rating: 2338 (May 2024)
- Peak rating: 2432 (September 2016)

Irene Kharisma Sukandar (born 7 April 1992) is an Indonesian chess player and a two-time Asian women's champion. She is the first female player from Indonesia to achieve both the Woman Grandmaster (WGM) and International Master (IM) titles. She graduated from Gunadarma University. She won two gold medals at the 2013 SEA Games.

== Career ==
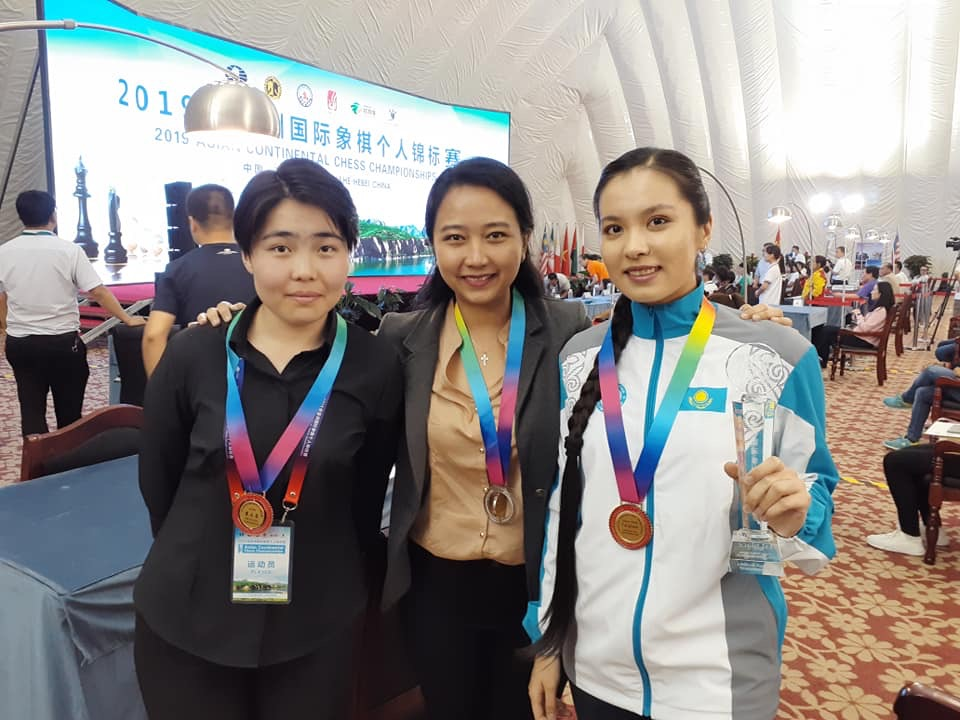
Sukandar as silver medalist stood between Turmunkh Munkhzul and Dinara Saduakassova at 2019 Asian Continental Chess Championship in China

Sukandar won the Indonesian Women's Chess Championship four times in a row from 2006 to 2010. She has represented Indonesia in five Women's Chess Olympiads from 2004 to 2014, the Women's Asian Team Chess Championship in 2009, the World Youth Under-16 Chess Olympiad in 2007, the 2006 Asian Games, the 2009 Asian Indoor Games, and the 2013 Asian Indoor and Martial Arts Games. She won the individual silver medal on board 3 in the 36th Chess Olympiad in 2004 and bronze in the team blitz chess event at the Asian Indoor and Martial Arts Games.

Sukandar was joint winner, with Vietnamese player Pham Bich Ngoc, of the under-16 girls' section of the 6th ASEAN Age Group Chess Championships in Pattaya, Thailand in June 2005. In the 2006 ASEAN Age Group Championships in Jakarta, she finished clear first in the under-18 girls' division.

In March 2008, Sukandar won the women's event of the 10th Rector Cup in Kharkiv, Ukraine edging out on tiebreak Ukrainian player Galina Breslavska. In July 2010, Sukandar shared first place with Indian FM Ramnath Bhuvanesh in the Brunei Invitational IM Tournament, earning an International Master (IM) norm result.

She won the 2012 Asian Women's Chess Championship in Ho Chi Minh City, Vietnam. Thanks to this victory she qualified to play in the Women's World Championship 2014, which was eventually postponed to 2015, becoming the first Indonesian ever to do so.

In May 2013, Sukandar won the 5th Alexander the Great Open, in Halkidiki, Greece. In December 2013 she won two individual gold medals, for rapid and blitz chess, at the 2013 SEA Games held in Naypyidaw, Myanmar.

In 2014, Sukandar won for the second time the Asian Women's Championship, which was held that year in Sharjah, United Arab Emirates. This victory qualified her for the knockout Women's World Championship 2016.

She won the G section (a ten-player round-robin tournament for female students) of the 2015 Moscow Open with a score of 7½/9, two points ahead of the runner-up, Alina Kashlinskaya. At the Women's World Chess Championship 2015, Sukandar was knocked out in the first round by Salome Melia.

In 2016, she shared first place in the Master section of the Continental Class Championships in Herndon, Virginia with Julio Sadorra, Sergey Erenburg and Priyadharshan Kannappan, and won the North Carolina Open with a score of 5/5 points.

In October 2016, Sukandar reached her highest ranking amongst the FIDE Top 100 Women at 42.

In 2018, she was the best female player at the Doeberl Cup by scoring 5½/9 points. In November 2018, she won the 2018 Hjorth Open by scoring 7½/9 points.

Between August 17 and August 25, 2022, Sukandar participated in the 28th Abu Dhabi International Chess Festival, a 9-round Swiss-system tournament held in the United Arab Emirates. She scored 5/9 points (4 wins, 3 losses, 2 draws) (Note: This includes wins against AGM Choudary B Vishal (2077), GM Baadur Jobava (2585), IM Vignesh N. R. (2467) and GM Robert Hovhannisyan (2599); losses against GM Raunak Sadhwani (2622), GM Jorden Van Foreest (2680) and GM Mahammad Muradli (2552); 2 draws against GM Wang Hao (2735) and GM Leon Luke Mendonca (2571). This numbers inside the brackets represent the opponent's elo rating.) and had a tournament performance rating of 2586, earning her second GM norm.

== Match against Dadang Subur (aka Dewa Kipas) ==
Sukandar and IM Levy Rozman entered Indonesian news in March 2021 when Rozman was defeated by an Indonesian chess player, Dadang Subur, known on Chess.com as Dewa_Kipas or "Fan God". Rozman suspected cheating, and he reported his opponent's account to the Chess.com Fairplay team. Subur's account was later closed for alleged cheating, which drew sympathy from Indonesian netizens and resulted in Rozman being harassed on social media. Rozman later went private on his social media accounts and took a short hiatus from streaming. Sukandar and the Indonesian Chess Association denounced the actions of Indonesian netizens, agreeing that the actions of Chess.com were correct and proportionate.

In an over-the-board match that was set up and staked by Indonesian sponsors, Sukandar played against Subur to prove his legitimacy. Subur was beaten with a score of 3–0 to an audience that peaked with 1.25 million concurrent viewers online, becoming the most-watched chess stream in history. Subur performed poorly during the matches, which was in stark contrast with his extremely high performance rating in many of his online games. Despite losing, Subur won approximately US$7,000 for his defeat. Subur continued to deny cheating, while Rozman tweeted in response: "Good: Chess can be popular. People who play unfairly will be caught. Bad: He won [US$7,000] and is being called brave and won't admit the truth."

== Personal life ==
On December 7, 2025, Sukandar announced her marriage to IM Eric Rosen.

== Notes ==
Awards and achievements
Preceded by Harika Dronavalli	Women's Asian Chess Champion; 2012	Succeeded by Huang Qian
Preceded by Huang Qian	Women's Asian Chess Champion; 2014	Succeeded by Mitra Hejazipour
