= Jan Jodilyn Fronda =

Filipina chess player (born 1994)

Personal information
- Born: 3 January 1994 (age 32) Alaminos, Pangasinan, Philippines
- Height: 1.64 m (5 ft 5 in)

Chess career
- Country: Philippines
- Title: Woman International Master (2014)
- Peak rating: 2184 (January 2017)

Jan Jodilyn Fronda (born 3 January 1994) is a Filipina chess player who won the women's Philippine Chess Championship in 2015 and 2019.

== Chess career ==
As a junior in 2013, Fronda won the girls' national championship and in September, 2013, she finished 28th in the girls' division in the World Junior Chess Championship in Turkey.

She earned the title of Woman international master (WIM) in 2014.

Fronda is a De La Salle University alumnus, and while at school she won awards as Rookie of the Year, Athlete of the Year, and was a three-time UAAP MVP award winner. She led the university's women's chess team to win the UAAP championship four consecutive times and won her first national championship in 2015.

While competing in the 2016 Chess Olympiad, Fronda's endgame win against GM Bela Khotenashvili was pivotal to the Filipina team's second round upset of Georgia.

After teaching chess in Singapore at the Asean Chess Academy for two years, she again won the women's national chess championship of the Philippines in 2019. The only undefeated player in the round-robin event, Fronda finished with six wins and seven draws, a full point ahead of her nearest competition. The Philippine News Agency called her 41-move win in a King's Indian Defense against WFM Allaney Jia Doroy a "brilliant final-round victory" although The Rappler quoted Fronda as saying, "I was lucky. Doroy appeared to have the advantage because her pieces were active but she did not assess the position accurately. That is why I got the advantage."

In August, 2022, she played second board for the Philippine women's Chess Olympiad team.

Known as "Coach Jodi" by her students at the Asean Chess Academy and in De La Salle Santiago Zobel School, Fronda is a licensed FIDE instructor for 2022-2023.

After resolving visa issues, Fronda was cleared to play second board for the Philippine women's team in the 2024 World Chess Olympiad.

== Personal life ==
Fronda is from Alaminos, Pangasinan.
