= Afruza Khamdamova =

Uzbekistani chess player (born 2009)

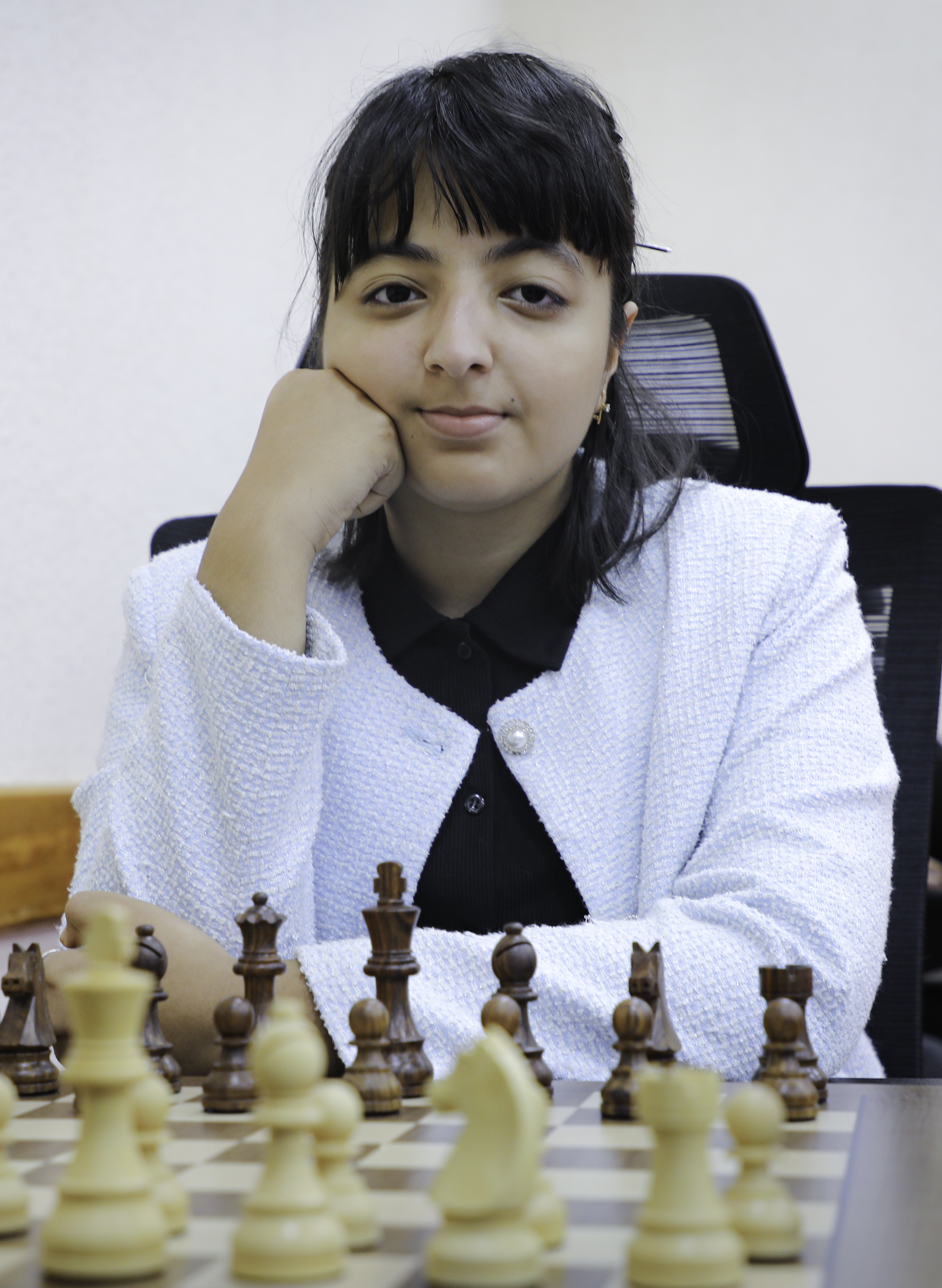
- Khamdamova in 2026

Personal information
- Born: 25 February 2009 (age 17) Surkhandarya, Uzbekistan

Chess career
- Country: Uzbekistan
- Title: Woman Grandmaster (2025)
- FIDE rating: 2443 (September 2026)
- Peak rating: 2447 (October 2026)

Afruza Khamdamova (Uzbek: Afruza Hamdamova, Афруза Ҳамдамова; born 25 February 2009) is an Uzbekistani chess player who holds the title of Woman Grandmaster (WGM). She is a two-time girls' World Youth Champion, once in 2023 in the U-14 section and again in 2024 in the U-16 section. She is the first Uzbekistani girl to become a World Youth Champion. She won the U-14 championship with a perfect 10/10 score after missing the first round due to visa troubles. Khamdamova is of Tajik ethnicity.
