= Wafia Al-Maamari =

Emirati chess player (born 2003)

Wafia Darwish Al-Maamari
Personal information
- Born: 2003 (age 22–23)

Chess career
- Country: United Arab Emirates
- Title: Woman International Master (2026)
- Peak rating: 2019 (January 2026)

Wafia Darwish Al-Maamari (Arabic: وافية درويش ألمعمري; born in 2003) is an Emirati chess Woman FIDE Master (WFM) (2020), Emirati Women's Chess Championship winner (2018).

== Chess career ==
In 2016 Wafia Darwish Al Maamari ranked in 3rd place in Emirati Women's Chess Championship. In 2018 she won Emirati Women's Chess Championship.

In 2023, in Baku Wafia Darwish Al Maamari participated in single-elimination Women's Chess World Cup and lost in 1st round to Woman Grandmaster Leya Garifullina.

Wafia Darwish Al Maamari played for United Arab Emirates in the Women's Chess Olympiads:

- In 2018, at second board in the 43rd Chess Olympiad (women) in Batumi (+2, =4, -4),
- In 2022, at second board in the 44th Chess Olympiad (women) in Chennai (+5, =2, -3).

In 2020, she was awarded the Women FIDE Master (WFM) title.
