= Medina Warda Aulia =

Indonesian chess player (born 1997)

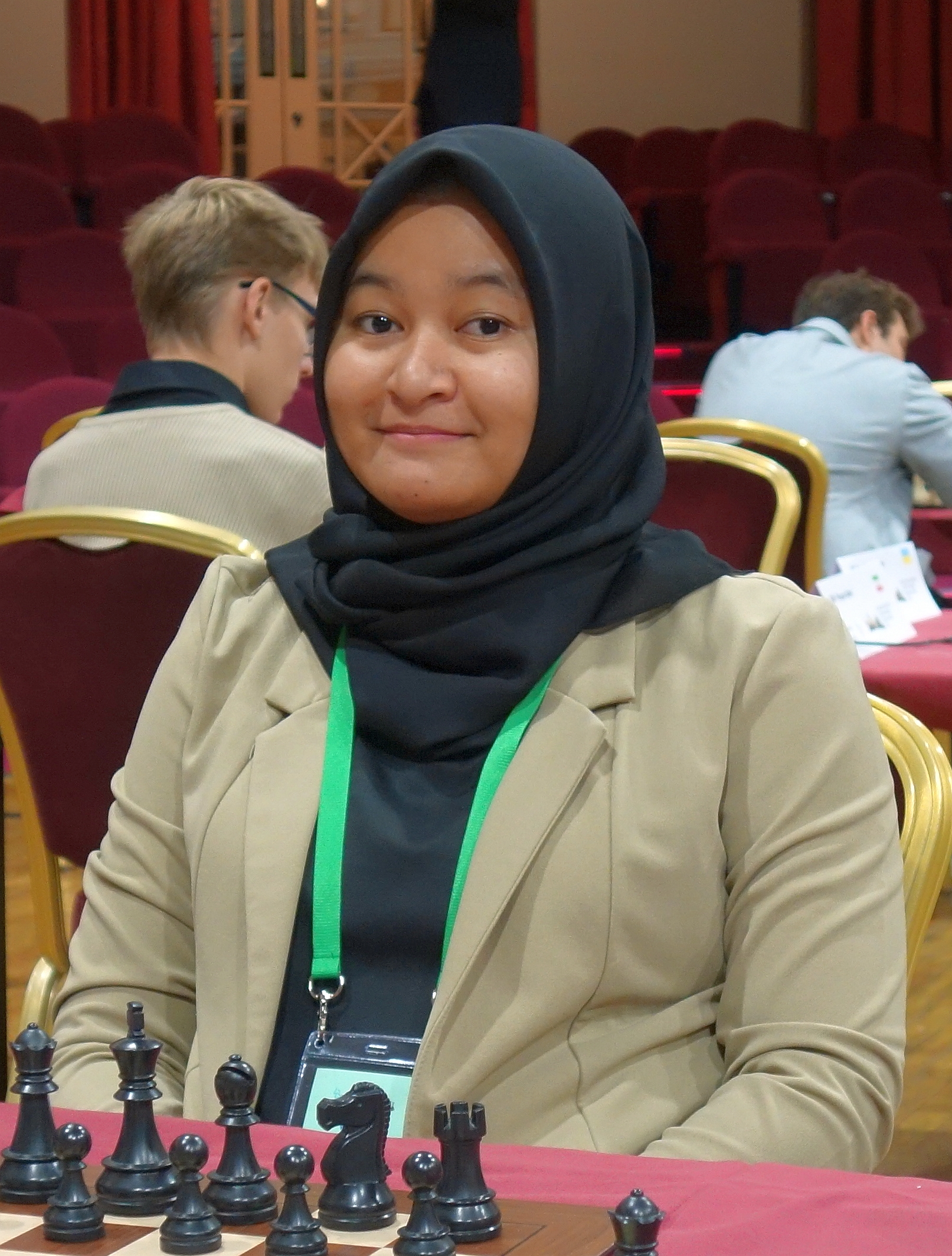
- Aulia in 2023

Personal information
- Born: 7 July 1997 (age 29) Jakarta, Indonesia

Chess career
- Country: Indonesia
- Title: International Master (2020); Woman Grandmaster (2013)
- Peak rating: 2417 (September 2015)

Medina Warda Aulia (born 7 July 1997 in Jakarta) is an Indonesian chess player. She has held the title of International Master since 2020, and Woman Grandmaster since 2013.

She qualified for the Women's Chess World Cup 2021, being defeated by Harika Dronavalli in the second round, and the Women's Chess World Cup 2023, where she beat Janelle Mae Frayna in the first round, and Sarasadat Khademalsharieh in the second round.

== Achievements ==
- 4th World Schools Chess Championships 2008 -Girls U11
- 10th ASEAN+ Age-Group Championships - Girls 12 in 2010
- 2nd Asean Chess Championships 2011 - Women
- Silver medal 2011 SEA Games Women's Individual Blitz Chess
- Bronze medal 2013 Asian Indoor and Martial Arts Games Mixed Team Blitz
- Bronze medal 2013 SEA Games Women's International Rapid and Women's International Blitz
- Bronze medal 2017 Asian Indoor and Martial Arts Games Women's Team Rapid
- Gold medal 2021 SEA Games Women's Team Rapid
