= Törmönkhiin Mönkhzul =

Mongolian chess player (born 2002)

Turmunkh Munkhzul
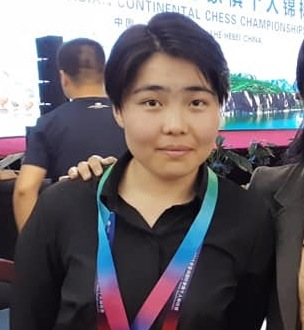

Personal information
- Born: Төрмөнхийн Мөнхзул; 4 May 2002 (age 24)

Chess career
- Country: Mongolia
- Title: Woman Grandmaster (2023)
- Peak rating: 2386 (July 2019)

Törmönkhiin Mönkhzul (Mongolian: Төрмөнхийн Мөнхзул; born 4 May 2002) is a Mongolian chess player who holds the title of Woman Grandmaster.

== Biography ==
In 2019 in Xingtai Turmunkh Munkhzul shared 3rd place in Asian Women's Chess Championship. In the same year she ranked in 3rd place in Women's World Chess Championship Eastern Asian Zonal tournament.

Turmunkh Munkhzul played for Mongolia in the Women's Chess Olympiads:

- In 2018, at third board in the 43rd Chess Olympiad (women) in Batumi (+6, =2, -2).
- 2022
- 2024

In 2021, in Sochi Turmunkh Munkhzul participated in Women's Chess World Cup where in 1st round won Marina Brunello with 2:0, but in 2nd round lost Polina Shuvalova with 0:2.

In 2019, she awarded the Women International Master (WIM) title.
