= Nilufar Yakubbaeva =

Uzbekistani chess player (born 2000)

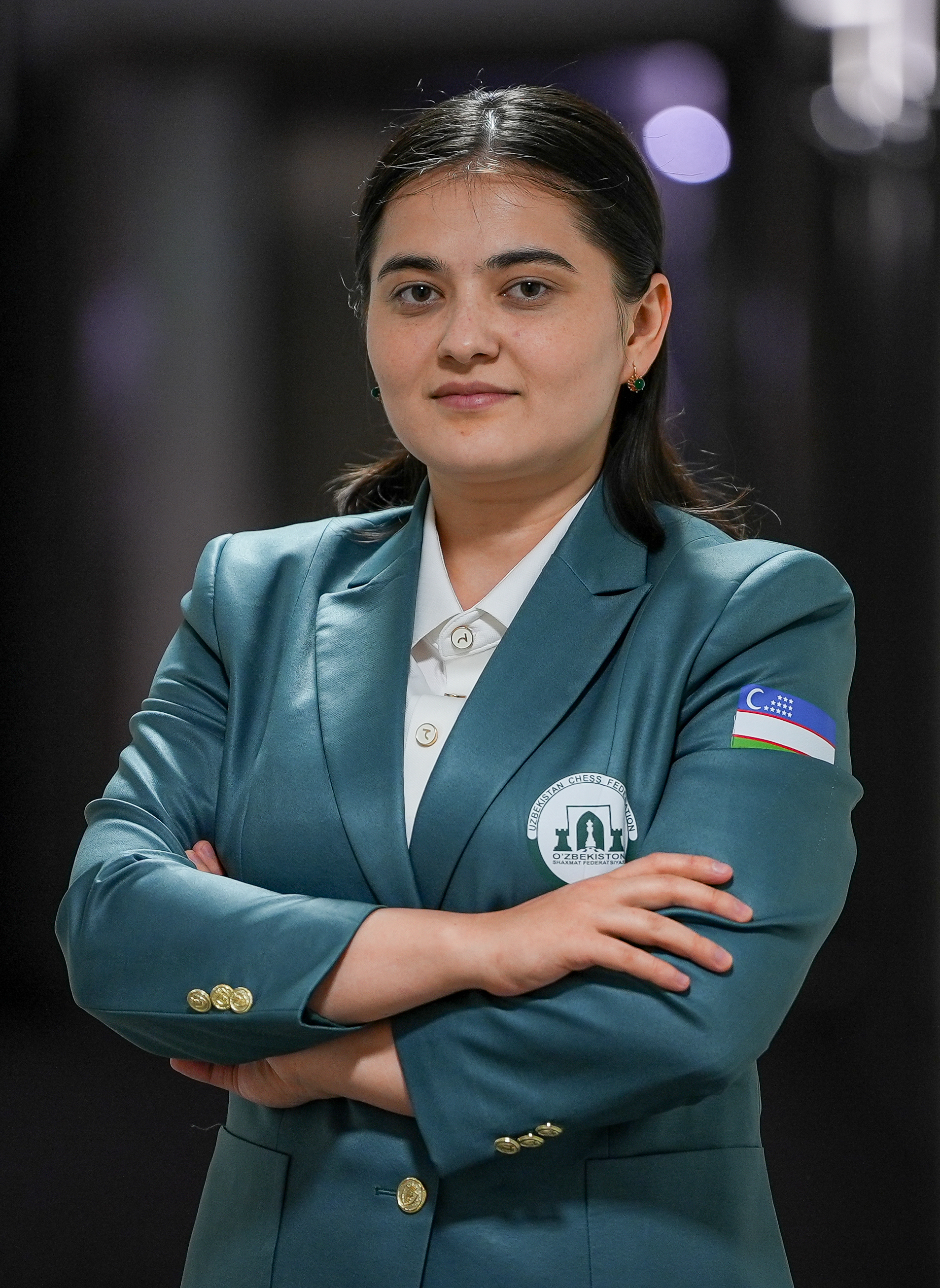

Personal information
- Born: Nilufar Muradovna Yakubbaeva; 29 August 2000 (age 25) Tashkent, Uzbekistan

Chess career
- Country: Uzbekistan
- Title: Woman Grandmaster (2022)
- Peak rating: 2373 (May 2023)

Nilufar Muradovna Yakubbaeva (born 29 August 2000) is an Uzbekistani chess player. She was awarded the title of Woman International Master in 2020 and Woman Grandmaster in 2022.

== Career ==
=== 2019–present ===
Since 2019, Yakubbaeva has won the Women's section of the Uzbekistani Chess Championship three years in a row; in 2019, 2020 and 2021.

In 2021, Yakubbaeva earned her first IM norm in the 14th Tashkent Open, Agzamov Memorial A. She ended the tournament with a score of 5/9, for a performance rating of 2468. She later earned her second IM norm at the 2nd International Chess Tournament for the Prizes of the President of Uzbekistan (also known as "President's Cup"), where she finished on 5.5/10 for a performance rating of 2491.

In 2022, Yakubbaeva won the first women's prize of the Abu Dhabi Masters with a score of 5.5/7.

== Personal life ==
Yakubbaeva has a younger brother, Nodirbek Yakubboev, who has won the Uzbekistani Chess Championship multiple times. As of May 2023, she is studying maths at the National University of Uzbekistan.
