= Janelle Mae Frayna =

Filipino chess player (born 1996)

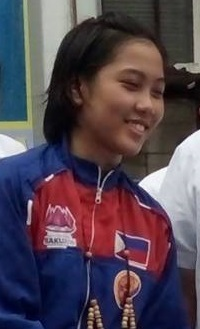
- Frayna in 2017

Personal information
- Born: May 19, 1996 (age 30) Legazpi, Albay

Chess career
- Country: Philippines
- Title: Woman Grandmaster (2016)
- Peak rating: 2325 (February 2017)

Janelle Mae Frayna (born May 19, 1996) is a Filipino chess player. She was awarded the title of Woman Grandmaster by FIDE in 2017, becoming the first from the Philippines to achieve this. She is a 3-time and the current Philippine Women's Chess Champion.

== Early life and education ==
Frayna was born on May 19, 1996, in Legazpi, Albay to George and Sonia Frayna. She is the only daughter of her parents, who work as engineers, and she has two brothers. She attended the Divine Word College of Legazpi, where she took her elementary and high school studies and was a consistent honor student.

Frayna entered the Far Eastern University under a scholarship which she earned on her third year in high school. In 2017, Frayna graduated with a degree of Psychology with cum laude honors and as valedictorian.

== Career ==
=== Early years ===
Frayna started playing chess at age 11 joining the Magayon Chess Club. She started showing interest to the sport when she was still an elementary school student. During her first two years in high school, she joined chess tournaments during City Meets as well as the Palarong Bicol and the Palarong Pambansa.

At the Philippine women's national championship, Frayna became the champion in two editions. She also finished first runner up twice in other editions of the same tournament. She also became champion for multiple times at the ASEAN Age-Group Chess Championships. After going through a six to eight months of extensive training, she enrolled at the Philippine Academy for Chess Excellence in 2010. In 2011, she won the Philippine National Juniors and became one of the youngest winners of that particular tournament.

Frayna gained the title of Woman FIDE Master in 2013 and a year later she became a Woman International Master.

=== FEU chess team ===
Frayna tried out for the Far Eastern University juniors chess team as a second year student but was initially rejected by Jayson Gonzales. She was also enrolled in Gonzales' then newly founded chess school, Philippine Academy for Chess Excellence (PACE). Gonzales changed his mind after seeing Frayna finished second in a tournament in Davao and has since became her long-time mentor.

She first won over a grandmaster and an international master, both men, at the Battle of the Grandmasters tournament in July 2014, becoming the first woman to do so. She also became the first woman to qualify for the men's division of the said tournament by becoming one of six top players of the 2014 competition.

Frayna was named co-recipient of the UAAP Season 77 Athlete of the Year award after leading her university's team at the UAAP Championship, along with table tennis player Ian Lariba.

=== Woman Grandmaster ===
At the 42nd Chess Olympiad held in September 2016, Frayna achieved her final norm to become eligible for the title of Woman Grandmaster. After the feat, she was dubbed by the media as the Philippines' first woman grandmaster. This title was later confirmed by the Presidential Board by written resolution in early 2017.

=== 2020s–present ===
Frayna was nominated by the National Chess Federation of the Philippines to play in the 2021 FIDE Women's World Cup in Sochi, Russia after the Philippines was given one of the 39 wild card slots for the tournament.

She took part in the 2021 Southeast Asian Games in Vietnam where she won two bronze medals; one for the women's rapid chess event and the second for the women's individual blitz. Since traditional chess was not part of the 2023 edition of the regional meet in Cambodia, Frayna took part in ouk chaktrang.

By October 2026, Frayna had become head teacher of the Philippine Academy for Chess Excellence of her former coach Jayson Gonzales.
