= Batkhuyag Munguntuul =

Mongolian chess player (born 1987)

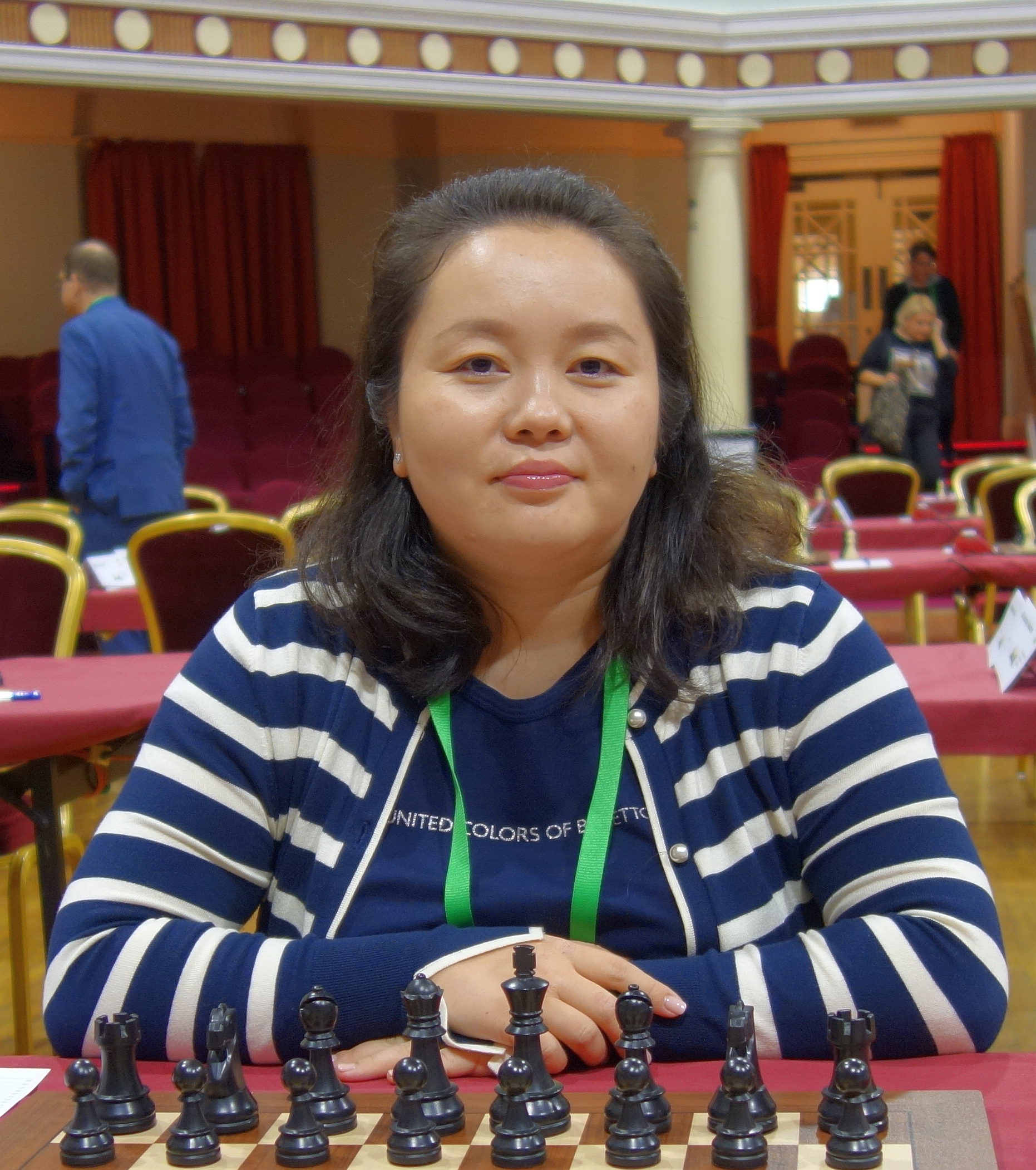
- Batkhuyag Munguntuul in 2023

Personal information
- Born: 8 October 1987 (age 38) Ulanbaatar, Mongolia

Chess career
- Country: Mongolia
- Title: International Master (2010); Woman Grandmaster (2003)
- Peak rating: 2467 (September 2011)

Batkhuyag Munguntuul (Mongolian: Батхуягийн Мөнгөнтуул; born 8 October 1987) is a Mongolian chess player who holds the FIDE titles of International Master (IM) and Woman Grandmaster (WGM). She competed in the Women's World Chess Championship in 2008 and 2010.

Munguntuul took part in the FIDE Women's Grand Prix series in 2009–10 as host city nominee, and 2011–12 as FIDE president nominee. Her best results were sharing fifth place in Nalchik in 2010 and finishing in sixth place at Ankara in 2012. She won the 2010 Women's World University Chess Championship in Zurich. In 2011, she won the silver medal in the women's individual chess event at the Summer Universiade in Shenzhen.

Munguntuul has played for the Mongolian team in the Women's Chess Olympiad, the Women's Asian Nations Cup and the 2006 Asian Games.

She also competed in the FIDE Grand Swiss Tournament 2019. She started the tournament with a FIDE rating was 2421, ranking her as 145th out of the 154 players competing. She started the tournament strong. As of the third round she was the highest ranked female player (ranked 27th overall), on two draws and a win. This placed her in elite company, with the top 30 players averaging a FIDE rating of 2663.5. As of the third round, the next highest ranked player in the tournament which had a FIDE rating below her was placed 140th. The next two games were lost, followed by 3 draws, a loss, a win and finally a draw. Ultimately placing her 107th on 5 points.
