= Dinara Saduakassova =

Kazakhstani chess player (born 1996)

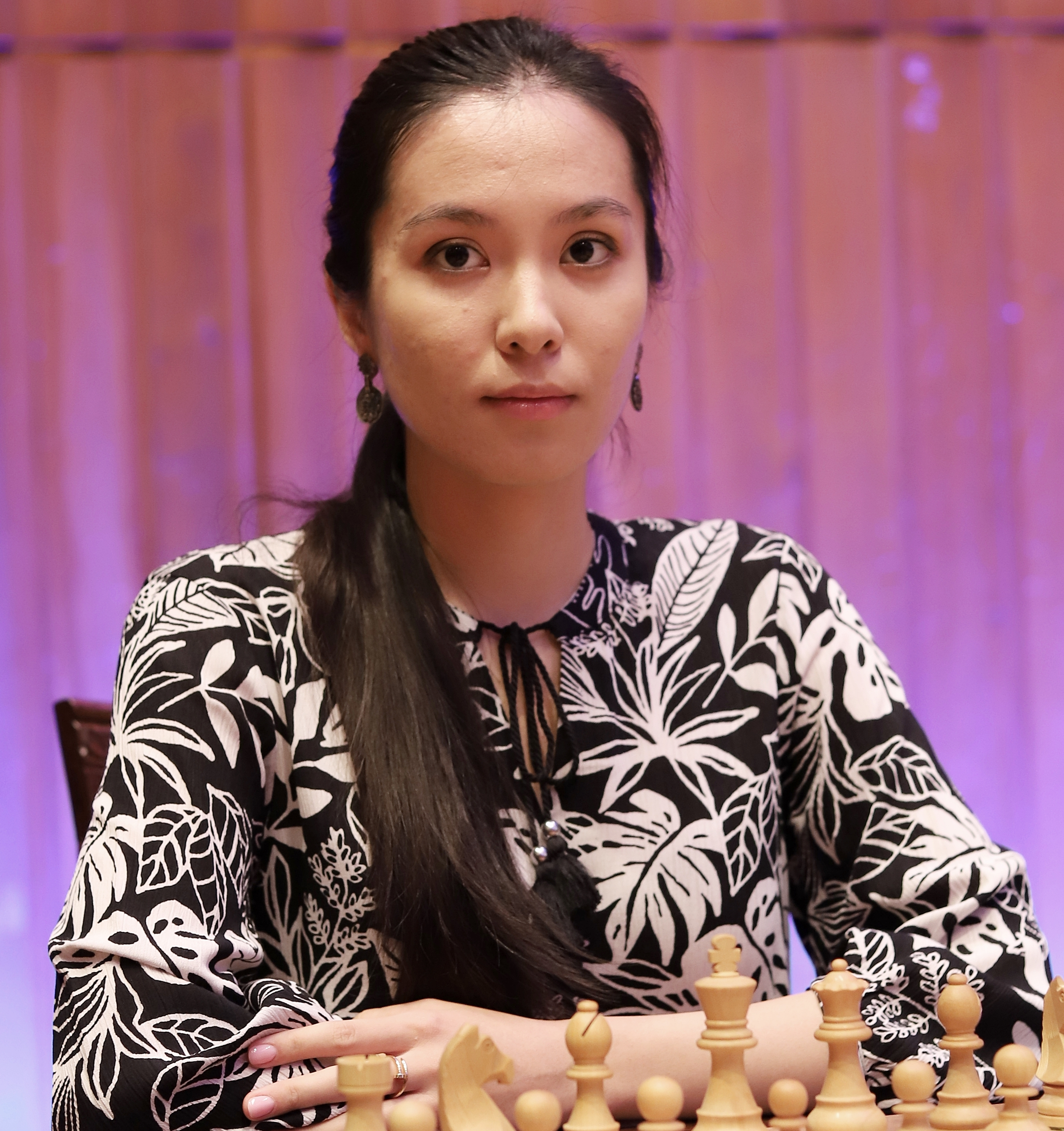
- Saduakassova in 2022

Personal information
- Born: 31 October 1996 (age 29) Akmola, Kazakhstan

Chess career
- Country: Kazakhstan
- Title: International Master (2017); Woman Grandmaster (2012)
- FIDE rating: 2435 (October 2026)
- Peak rating: 2519 (January 2020)

Dinara Saduakassova (Kazakh: Динара Сәдуақасова, Dinara Säduaqasova; born 31 October 1996) is a Kazakhstani chess player who holds the FIDE titles of International Master (IM) and Woman Grandmaster (WGM).

== Career ==
Born in Astana, Kazakhstan, she won the World Youth Chess Championship twice, in the girls under-14 category in 2010 and girls under-18 in 2014.

When she participated in the 2012 Olympiad in Istanbul, she was, at the age of fifteen, the youngest player, and her performance there resulted in her being awarded the Woman Grand Master title. That same year, she shared first place at the Moscow Open.

She played for the Kazakhstani national team in four Women's Chess Olympiads (2008, 2010, 2012, and 2014); at the Olympiad in 2014, the team got the 6th place. She played in two Women's World Team Chess Championships (2013 and 2015) and three Women's Asian Nations Cups (2012, 2014, and 2016); the team won the bronze medal in the 2016 Women's Asian Nations Cup in Abu Dhabi. She also played with a national team in the 2011 World Youth Under-16 Chess Olympiad. In 2015, Saduakassova played for Macedonian team "Gambit Asseco SEE" that won the silver medal in the Women's European Club Cup in Skopje.

In August 2016, Saduakassova won the World Junior Girls Championship in Bhubaneswar, India. She participated in the Women's World Chess Championship 2017, losing to Harika Dronavalli in the second round. She also gained the International Master title that year.

In October 2019, she received her first grandmaster norm while participating in the 2019 FIDE Chess.com Grand Swiss tournament with a tournament rating of 2650.

== Activism ==
On 17 November 2017, Dinara Saduakassova became National Ambassador for the United Nations Children's Fund in Kazakhstan.
