= Võ Thị Kim Phụng =

Vietnamese chess player

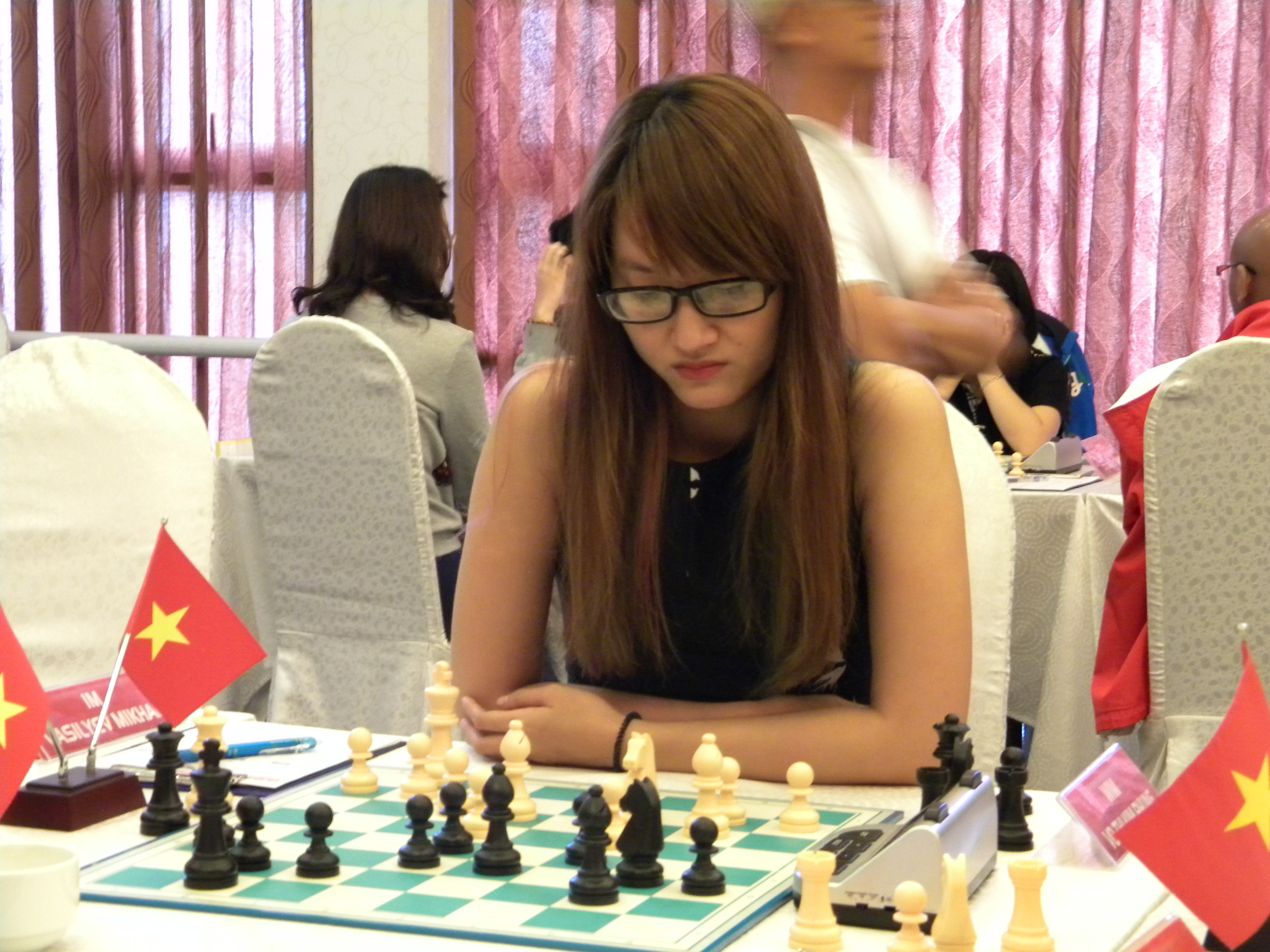
- Võ at the HDBank Open in 2016

Personal information
- Born: June 8, 1993 (age 33) Huế, Vietnam

Chess career
- Country: Vietnam
- Title: Woman Grandmaster (2017)
- Peak rating: 2425 (January 2018)

Võ Thị Kim Phụng (born 8 June 1993) is a Vietnamese chess player. She won the Asian Junior Girls Championship in 2010 and 2013. Võ also won gold medals at the ASEAN Age-Group Championships in the Girls U-12 category in 2004, the Girls U-14 in 2006 and 2007, the Girls U-16 in 2009, and the Girls U-20 in 2011, 2012 and 2013.

In March 2017, she won the Women's Zonal 3.3 Championship to qualify to play in the Women's World Chess Championship. In May, Võ won the Asian Women's Championship in Chengdu, China. As a result of this victory, she was awarded the title Woman Grandmaster (WGM) by FIDE. In 2018, Võ competed in the Women's World Championship in Khanty-Mansiysk, Russia. She was knocked out by Bela Khotenashvili in the first round after losing by a score of ½–1½.

Awards and achievements
| Preceded by Bhakti Kulkarni | Women's Asian Chess Champion; 2017 | Succeeded by Padmini Rout |
