= Ju-jitsu at the 2022 Asian Games =

2022 Asian Games

- Venue: Xiaoshan Linpu Gymnasium
- Dates: 5–7 October 2023
- Competitors: 184 from 28 nations

Ju-jitsu at the 2022 Asian Games was held at Xiaoshan Linpu Gymnasium, Hangzhou, China, from 5 to 7 October 2023. The competition included only jiu-jitsu (ne-waza) events.

== Schedule ==
P	Preliminary rounds & Repechage	F	Finals

Event↓/Date →	5th Thu		6th Fri		7th Sat	
Men's 62 kg	P	F				
Men's 69 kg	P	F				
Men's 77 kg			P	F		
Men's 85 kg					P	F
Women's 48 kg	P	F				
Women's 52 kg			P	F		
Women's 57 kg			P	F		
Women's 63 kg					P	F

== Medalists ==
=== Men ===
Event	Gold	Silver	Bronze
−62 kg	Khaled Al-Shehi; United Arab Emirates	Khalid Al-Blooshi; United Arab Emirates	Abdulmalik Al-Murdhi; Saudi Arabia
−62 kg	Khaled Al-Shehi; United Arab Emirates	Khalid Al-Blooshi; United Arab Emirates	Mansur Khabibulla; Kazakhstan
−69 kg	Nurzhan Batyrbekov; Kazakhstan	Mohamed Al-Suwaidi; United Arab Emirates	Joo Seong-hyeon; South Korea
−69 kg	Nurzhan Batyrbekov; Kazakhstan	Mohamed Al-Suwaidi; United Arab Emirates	Aldiyar Serik; Kazakhstan
−77 kg	Koo Bon-cheol; South Korea	Ali Munfaredi; Bahrain	Mahdi Al-Awlaqi; United Arab Emirates
−77 kg	Koo Bon-cheol; South Korea	Ali Munfaredi; Bahrain	Mönkhtöriin Davaadorj; Mongolia
−85 kg	Faisal Al-Ketbi; United Arab Emirates	Kim Hee-seoung; South Korea	Omar Nada; Saudi Arabia
−85 kg	Faisal Al-Ketbi; United Arab Emirates	Kim Hee-seoung; South Korea	Saeed Al-Kubaisi; United Arab Emirates

=== Women ===
Event	Gold	Silver	Bronze
−48 kg	Meggie Ochoa; Philippines	Balqees Abdulla; United Arab Emirates	Phùng Thị Huệ; Vietnam
−48 kg	Meggie Ochoa; Philippines	Balqees Abdulla; United Arab Emirates	Kacie Tan; Thailand
−52 kg	Asma Al-Hosani; United Arab Emirates	Miao Jie; China	Park Jeong-hye; South Korea
−52 kg	Asma Al-Hosani; United Arab Emirates	Miao Jie; China	Kaila Napolis; Philippines
−57 kg	Annie Ramirez; Philippines	Galina Duvanova; Kazakhstan	Shamsa Al-Ameri; United Arab Emirates
−57 kg	Annie Ramirez; Philippines	Galina Duvanova; Kazakhstan	Orapa Senatham; Thailand
−63 kg	Shamma Al-Kalbani; United Arab Emirates	Sung Ki-ra; South Korea	Marian Urdabayeva; Kazakhstan
−63 kg	Shamma Al-Kalbani; United Arab Emirates	Sung Ki-ra; South Korea	Choi Hee-joo; South Korea

== Medal table ==
Rank	Nation	Gold	Silver	Bronze	Total
1	United Arab Emirates (UAE)	4	3	3	10
2	Philippines (PHI)	2	0	1	3
3	South Korea (KOR)	1	2	3	6
4	Kazakhstan (KAZ)	1	1	3	5
5	Bahrain (BRN)	0	1	0	1
5	China (CHN)	0	1	0	1
7	Saudi Arabia (KSA)	0	0	2	2
7	Thailand (THA)	0	0	2	2
9	Mongolia (MGL)	0	0	1	1
9	Vietnam (VIE)	0	0	1	1
Totals (10 entries)		8	8	16	32

== Participating nations ==
A total of 184 athletes from 28 nations competed in ju-jitsu at the 2022 Asian Games:

- Afghanistan (3)
- Bahrain (3)
- Cambodia (1)
- China (3)
- Chinese Taipei (1)
- India (11)
- Indonesia (1)
- Iran (2)
- Iraq (1)
- Jordan (8)
- Kazakhstan (16)
- Kuwait (5)
- Kyrgyzstan (9)
- Laos (2)
- Malaysia (2)
- Mongolia (16)
- Palestine (3)
- Philippines (11)
- Qatar (3)
- Saudi Arabia (7)
- Singapore (9)
- South Korea (12)
- Tajikistan (5)
- Thailand (16)
- Turkmenistan (4)
- United Arab Emirates (16)
- Uzbekistan (8)
- Vietnam (6)
