= Ju-jitsu at the Asian Games =

- Governing bodies: JJIF (World) / JJAU (Asia)
- Events: 8 (men: 5; women: 3)

Games
- 1951; 1954; 1958; 1962; 1966; 1970; 1974; 1978; 1982; 1986; 1990; 1994; 1998; 2002; 2006; 2010; 2014; 2018; 2022; 2026
- Medalists

Ju-jitsu has been included in the Asian Games since the 2018 Asian Games in Indonesia.

== Editions ==
Games	Year	Host city	Best nation
XVIII	2018	Jakarta–Palembang, Indonesia	United Arab Emirates
XIX	2022	Hangzhou, China	United Arab Emirates
XX	2026	Nagoya, Japan	United Arab Emirates

== Events ==
Event	18	22	26	Years
Jiu-jitsu
Men's 56 kg	X			1
Men's 62 kg	X	X	X	3
Men's 69 kg	X	X	X	3
Men's 77 kg	X	X	X	3
Men's 85 kg	X	X	X	3
Men's 94 kg	X		X	2
Women's 48/49 kg	X	X	X	3
Women's 52 kg		X	X	2
Women's 57 kg		X		1
Women's 62/63 kg	X	X	X	3
Total	8	8	8	24

== Medal table ==
Rank	Nation	Gold	Silver	Bronze	Total
1	United Arab Emirates (UAE)	11	10	6	27
2	Kazakhstan (KAZ)	3	3	9	15
3	South Korea (KOR)	2	4	8	14
4	Philippines (PHI)	2	1	3	6
5	Saudi Arabia (KSA)	2	0	5	7
6	Jordan (JOR)	1	2	3	6
7	Thailand (THA)	1	0	5	6
8	Kyrgyzstan (KGZ)	1	0	3	4
9	Cambodia (CAM)	1	0	0	1
10	Bahrain (BRN)	0	1	0	1
10	China (CHN)	0	1	0	1
10	Singapore (SGP)	0	1	0	1
13	Mongolia (MGL)	0	0	3	3
14	Vietnam (VIE)	0	0	2	2
15	Turkmenistan (TKM)	0	0	1	1
Totals (15 entries)		24	23	48	95

== Participating nations ==
Nation	18	22	Years
Afghanistan	7	3	2
Bahrain	5	3	2
Cambodia	2	1	2
China	2	3	2
Chinese Taipei	3	1	2
India		11	1
Indonesia	16	1	2
Iran	10	2	2
Iraq	2	1	2
Jordan	12	8	2
Kazakhstan	15	16	2
Kuwait	4	5	2
Kyrgyzstan	11	9	2
Laos		2	1
Lebanon	1		1
Malaysia		2	1
Mongolia	15	16	2
Pakistan	4		1
Palestine	3	3	2
Philippines	9	11	2
Qatar		3	1
Saudi Arabia	3	7	2
Singapore	7	9	2
South Korea	2	12	2
Syria	2		1
Tajikistan	3	5	2
Thailand	14	16	2
Turkmenistan	11	4	2
United Arab Emirates	15	16	2
Uzbekistan	10	8	2
Vietnam	4	6	2
Yemen	4		1
Number of nations	28	28	
Number of athletes	196	184	
