= Philippines at the 2022 Asian Games =

Philippines at the 2022 Asian Games in Hangzhou

- IOC code: PHI
- NOC: Philippine Olympic Committee
- Website: www.olympic.ph (in English)

in Hangzhou 23 September 2023 – 8 October 2023
- Competitors: 388 in 43 sports
- Flag bearers (opening): Margielyn Didal; EJ Obiena
- Flag bearer (closing): Sakura Alforte
- Medals Ranked 17th: Gold 4 Silver 2 Bronze 12 Total 18

Asian Games appearances (overview)
- 1951; 1954; 1958; 1962; 1966; 1970; 1974; 1978; 1982; 1986; 1990; 1994; 1998; 2002; 2006; 2010; 2014; 2018; 2022; 2026

The Philippines competed at the 2022 Asian Games in Hangzhou, China from 23 September to 8 October 2023. Originally scheduled to take place in 2022, the Games were postponed and rescheduled to 2023, due to the COVID-19 pandemic.

The country finished with four golds, two silvers, and 12 bronze medals.

== Background ==
=== Preparations ===
Preparation for the Philippines' participation in the 2022 Asian Games began as early as February 2021, with Philippine Olympic Committee board member George Canlas designated as chef de mission. The buildup of the Philippines team started early due to anticipation that the 2022 Philippine general election could impact preparations. However the Asian Games would be postponed to 2023. The postponement was received positively.

The Philippine Olympic Committee aimed for the delegation to match or surpass its previous record of four gold medals in the 2018 Asian Games in Jakarta and Palembang.

The Philippine Sports Commission organized a sending off ceremony for the delegation on 18 September 2023 at the Philippine International Convention Center in Pasay. Philippine Fencing Association president Richard Gomez, whose daughter Juliana competed in the fencing tournament, was the delegation's chef de mission.

The delegation was projected to consist of 395 athletes competing in 40 sports. However this was subject to change, with the country prospectively replacing injured and unavailable athletes through a formal appeal.

The last-minute appeals filed to the organizing committee in September covered five sports.

=== Broadcasters ===
Name	Type	Ref.
One Sports	Terrestrial, streaming	
Smart	Streaming platform	

== Medalists ==
The following Philippine competitors won medals at the Games.

=== Gold ===
No.	Medal	Name	Sport	Event	Date
1	Gold	EJ Obiena	Athletics	Men's pole vault	30 September
2	Gold	Meggie Ochoa	Ju-jitsu	Women's ne-waza 48 kg	5 October
3	Gold	Annie Ramirez	Ju-jitsu	Women's ne-waza 57 kg	6 October
4	Gold	Japeth Aguilar; Kevin Alas; Justin Brownlee; June Mar Fajardo; Ange Kouame; Marcio Lassiter; Chris Newsome; Calvin Oftana; CJ Perez; Chris Ross; Scottie Thompson; Arvin Tolentino	Basketball	Men's team	6 October

=== Silver ===
No.	Medal	Name	Sport	Event	Date
1	Silver	Arnel Mandal	Wushu	Men's sanda 56 kg	28 September
2	Silver	Eumir Marcial	Boxing	Men's 80 kg	5 October

=== Bronze ===
No.	Medal	Name	Sport	Event	Date
1	Bronze	Patrick King Perez	Taekwondo	Men's individual poomsae	24 September
2	Bronze	Jones Inso	Wushu	Men's taijiquan & taijijian	25 September
3	Bronze	Gideon Fred Padua	Wushu	Men's sanda -60 kg	27 September
4	Bronze	Clemente Tabugara Jr.	Wushu	Men's sanda -65 kg	27 September
5	Bronze	Alexandra Eala	Tennis	Women's singles	28 September
6	Bronze	Francis Alcantara; Alexandra Eala	Tennis	Mixed doubles	29 September
7	Bronze	Patrick Coo	Cycling	Men's BMX race	1 October
8	Bronze	Elreen Ando	Weightlifting	Women's 64 kg	2 October
9	Bronze	Ronsited Gabayeron; Mark Joseph Gonzales; Jason Huerte; Rheyjey Ortouste; Jom Lerry Rafael; Vince Alyson Torno	Sepak takraw	Men's quadrant	3 October
10	Bronze	Sakura Alforte	Karate	Women's kata	5 October
11	Bronze	Ronsited Gabayeron; Mark Joseph Gonzales; Jason Huerte; Rheyjey Ortouste; Jom Lerry Rafael	Sepak takraw	Men's regu	6 October
12	Bronze	Kaila Napolis	Ju-jitsu	Women's ne-waza 52 kg	6 October

=== Multiple ===
Name	Sport	Gold	Silver	Bronze	Total
Alexandra Eala	Tennis	0	0	2	2
Ronsited Gabayeron	Sepak takraw	0	0	2	2
Mark Joseph Gonzales	Sepak takraw	0	0	2	2
Jason Huerte	Sepak takraw	0	0	2	2
Rheyjey Ortouste	Sepak takraw	0	0	2	2
Jom Lerry Rafael	Sepak takraw	0	0	2	2

== Medal summary ==
=== Medals by sports ===
Sport	1st place, gold medalist(s)	2nd place, silver medalist(s)	3rd place, bronze medalist(s)	Total
Ju-jitsu	2	0	1	3
Athletics	1	0	0	1
Basketball	1	0	0	1
Wushu	0	1	3	4
Boxing	0	1	0	1
Sepak takraw	0	0	2	2
Tennis	0	0	2	2
Cycling	0	0	1	1
Karate	0	0	1	1
Taekwondo	0	0	1	1
Weightlifting	0	0	1	1
Total	4	2	12	18

=== Medals by Date ===
Day	Date	1st place, gold medalist(s)	2nd place, silver medalist(s)	3rd place, bronze medalist(s)	Total
1	24 September	0	0	1	1
2	25 September	0	0	1	1
3	26 September	0	0	0	0
4	27 September	0	0	2	2
5	28 September	0	1	1	2
6	29 September	0	0	1	1
7	30 September	1	0	0	1
8	1 October	0	0	1	1
9	2 October	0	0	1	1
10	3 October	0	0	1	1
11	4 October	0	0	0	0
12	5 October	1	1	1	3
13	6 October	2	0	2	4
14	7 October	0	0	0	0
15	8 October	0	0	0	0
Total		4	2	12	18

== Archery ==
=== Compound ===
Athlete	Event	Ranking Round		Round of 64	Round of 32	Round of 16	Quarterfinals	Semifinals	Final / BM	Rank
Athlete	Event	Total Score	Seed	Opposition Score	Opposition Score	Opposition Score	Opposition Score	Opposition Score	Opposition Score	Rank
Paul Dela Cruz	Men's individual	686	38	Bye	Yang J.W. (KOR); L 142–149	Did not advance				
Andrea Robles	Women's individual	684	18	Bye	Nguyễn T.H.C. (VIE); L 136–145	Did not advance				
Amaya Cojuangco	Women's individual	671	31	Bye	Cheng H.T. (HKG); W 145–140	Chen Y.Hs. (TPE); W 144–144	Swami (IND); L 143–149	Did not advance		
Amaya Cojuangco; Paul dela Cruz	Mixed team	1370	11	—N/a		Indonesia; L 153–156	Did not advance			

=== Recurve ===
Athlete	Event	Ranking Round		Round of 64	Round of 32	Round of 16	Quarterfinals	Semifinals	Final / BM	Rank
Athlete	Event	Total Score	Seed	Opposition Score	Opposition Score	Opposition Score	Opposition Score	Opposition Score	Opposition Score	Rank
Jayson Feliciano	Men's individual	666	18	Bye	Nam (TJK); L 3–7	Did not advance				
Jonathan Reaport	Men's individual	645	38	Law P.L. (HKG); W 6–4	Salsabilla (INA); L 4–6	Did not advance				
Gabrielle Bidaure	Women's individual	606	48	Artsalee (THA); L 2–6	Did not advance					
Pia Bidaure	Women's individual	566	65	Octavia (INA); L 0–6	Did not advance					
Gabrielle Bidaure; Jayson Feliciano	Mixed team	1272	14	—N/a		Chinese Taipei; L 0–6	Did not advance			

== Athletics ==
The Philippines sent a 16-athlete team for the Asian Games. The world rank no. 2 male pole vaulter, EJ Obiena was expected to be the best bet among them to win a gold medal.

Obiena would win the Philippines' first gold medal for this edition of the Asian Games by successful leaping 5.90m in the pole vault event – .25 more than the nearest competitor.

=== Results ===
Key

- Q = Qualified for the next round
- q = Qualified for the next round as a fastest loser or, in field events, by position without achieving the qualifying target
- GR = Asian Games record
- NR = National record
- PB = Personal best
- SB = Season best
- NM = No mark
- N/A = Round not applicable for the event

=== Men ===
==== Track and road events ====
Athlete	Event	Heat		Semifinal		Final	
Athlete	Event	Result	Rank	Result	Rank	Result	Rank
John Cabang	110m hurdles	13.70	2 Q	—N/a		13.62	4
Eric Cray	400m hurdles	50.24	5	Did not advance			
Michael del Prado; Frederick Ramirez; Joyme Sequita; Umajesty Williams	4 × 400m relay	3:06.15	1 Q NR	—N/a		3:04.89	5 NR

==== Field events ====
Athlete	Event	Qualification		Final	
Athlete	Event	Distance	Position	Distance	Position
Janry Ubas	Long jump	7.79 m	3 q	7.80	7
Ronnie Malipay	Triple jump	—N/a		15.52	10
EJ Obiena	Pole vault	—N/a		5.90 GR	1st place, gold medalist(s)
William Morrison III	Shot put	—N/a		16.98	11

=== Women ===
==== Track and road events ====
Athlete	Event	Heat		Semifinal		Final	
Athlete	Event	Result	Rank	Result	Rank	Result	Rank
Kristina Knott	100m	11.77	3	Did not advance			
Kristina Knott	200m	24.02	2 Q	—N/a		23.79	6
Robyn Lauren Brown	400m hurdles	58.34	5 q	—N/a		57.55	6
Lauren Hoffman	400m hurdles	57.61	2 Q	—N/a		57.21	5
Robyn Lauren Brown; Angel Frank; Lauren Hoffman; Maureen Schrijvers	4 × 400m relay	—N/a				3:40.78	5

==== Combined events – Women's heptathlon ====
Athlete	Event	100H	HJ	SP	200 m	LJ	JT	800 m	Total	Rank
Sarah Dequinan	Result	14.78s 871 pts	1.67m 818 pts	10.47m 560 pts	26.04s 794 pts	5.77m 780 pts	43.34m 731 pts	2:37.62; 600 pts	5154	9

== Baseball ==
Team	Event	Round 1			Round 2				Placement / Super round			Final / BM	
Team	Event	Opposition Score	Opposition Score	Rank	Opposition Score	Opposition Score	Opposition Score	Rank	Opposition Score	Opposition Score	Rank	Opposition Score	Rank
Philippines men's	Men's tournament	bye		—N/a	Japan; L 0–6	China; L 0–2	Laos; W 7–0	3 PR	Hong Kong; W 5–1	Thailand; W 11–1	1	Did not advance	5

Team roster

Philippines roster – 2022 Asian Games
Players		Coaches
Pitchers: 8 Junmar Diarao; 12 Kennedy Torres; 14 Vladimir Eguia; 20 Romeo Jasmin; 24 Raymond Nerosa; 40 Joshua Pineda	Catchers: 4 Samuel Renato Jr.; 18 Steven Manaig; 26 Alfredo De Guzman; Infielders: 1 Jennald Pareja; 3 Benjamin Sarmiento; 6 Kyle Soberano; 10 Ignacio Escaño; 15 Clarence Caasalan; 19 Adrianne Bernardo; 28 Mark John Beronilla; 35 Jon-Jon Robles; 55 Harper Gerald Sy; Outfielders: 2 Carlos Alberto Munoz; 9 Lord Aragorn De Vera; 16 Erwin Bosito; 17 Juan Álvaro Macaset; 27 Ferdinand Liguayan; 41 Jonhil Carreon	Coaches (Philippines) Isaac Bacarisas (Philippines) Orlando Binarao

=== Round 2 ===
Pos	Team	Pld	W	L	RF	RA	PCT	GB	Qualification
1	China	3	3	0	18	0	1.000	—	Super round
2	Japan	3	2	1	24	1	.667	1	Super round
3	Philippines	3	1	2	7	8	.333	2	Placement round
4	Laos	3	0	3	0	40	.000	3	Placement round

Source: OCA

1 October; 12:00	Japan	6–0	Philippines	Baseball & Softball Sports Center, Shaoxing; Umpires: Wang Tianyi (CHN)
1 October; 12:00	WP: Mizuki Kato	Boxscore	LP: Paulo Macasaet	Baseball & Softball Sports Center, Shaoxing; Umpires: Wang Tianyi (CHN)

2 October; 12:00	Philippines	0–2	China	Baseball & Softball Sports Center, Shaoxing; Umpires: Chen Te-jung (TPE)
2 October; 12:00	LP: Romeo Jasmin	Boxscore	WP: Li Ningji	Baseball & Softball Sports Center, Shaoxing; Umpires: Chen Te-jung (TPE)

3 October; 18:30	Philippines	7–0	Laos	Baseball & Softball Sports Center, Shaoxing; Umpires: Lee Seung-chul (KOR)
3 October; 18:30	WP: Raymond Nerosa	Boxscore	LP: Mung Chuevakham	Baseball & Softball Sports Center, Shaoxing; Umpires: Lee Seung-chul (KOR)

=== Placement round ===
Pos	Team	Pld	W	L	RF	RA	PCT	GB
1	Philippines	3	3	0	23	2	1.000	—
2	Hong Kong	3	2	1	20	5	.667	1
3	Thailand	3	1	2	7	19	.333	2
4	Laos	3	0	3	0	24	.000	3

Source: OCA

5 October; 18:30	Hong Kong	1–5	Philippines	Baseball & Softball Sports Center, Shaoxing; Umpires: Wang Tianyi (CHN)
5 October; 18:30	LP: Lam Lai Him	Boxscore	WP: Junmar Diarao; Sv: Romeo Jasmin	Baseball & Softball Sports Center, Shaoxing; Umpires: Wang Tianyi (CHN)

6 October; 12:00	Thailand	1–11 (F/8)	Philippines	Baseball & Softball Sports Center, Shaoxing; Umpires: Hironori Yoshino (JPN)
6 October; 12:00	LP: Siraphop Nadee	Boxscore	WP: Kennedy Torres	Baseball & Softball Sports Center, Shaoxing; Umpires: Hironori Yoshino (JPN)

== Basketball ==
Summary

Team	Event	Group Stage					Qualifications	Quarterfinals	Semifinals	Final / BM	
Team	Event	Opposition Score	Opposition Score	Opposition Score	Opposition Score	Rank	Opposition Score	Opposition Score	Opposition Score	Opposition Score	Rank
Philippines men's	Men's tournament	Bahrain; W 89–61	Thailand; W 87–72	Jordan; L 62–87	—N/a	2 Q	Qatar; W 80–41	Iran; W 84–83	China; W 77–76	Jordan; W 70–60	1st place, gold medalist(s)
Philippines women's	Women's tournament	Kazakhstan; W 83–59	Hong Kong; W 99–63	Japan; L 59–96	—N/a	2 Q	—N/a	South Korea; L 71–93	Did not advance		5
Philippines men's	Men's 3x3 tournament	Jordan; W 13–8	Chinese Taipei; W 17–12	Hong Kong; W 21–15	Mongolia; L 12–21	3 Q	Kazakhstan; W 15–14	South Korea; L 16–19	Did not advance		8
Philippines women's	Women's 3x3 tournament	Jordan; WD	Hong Kong; WD	Mongolia; WD	—N/a	—N/a	Withdrew				

=== 5x5 basketball ===
==== Men's tournament ====
The Philippine national team is coming from a 2023 FIBA Basketball World Cup stint playing their last game on September 2, 2023. Chot Reyes stepped down from the head coach role and was replaced by Tim Cone, who had to lead the team in the Asian Games in short notice. Despite this, the national team went on to win their first gold medal since the 1962 Asian Games.

However Justin Brownlee would fail a doping test. He tested positive for Carboxy THC. The gold is expected to remain with the national team as regulations require two other players to fail their doping tests.

Team roster

The team roster was first announced on September 12, 2023. On September 19, further changes were made due to eligibility issues and injuries. Changes to the entry by names list submitted to the organizing committee on July 25 required to undergo an appeal. The inclusion of four players were rejected due to not being part of a prior 37-man shortlist submitted to the organizing committee.

Philippines national basketball – 2022 Asian Games roster
Players
Coaches

Pos.	No.	Name	Age – Date of birth	Height	Club	Ctr.
G/F	3	Chris Newsome	33 – 25 July 1990	1.88 m (6 ft 2 in)	Meralco Bolts	(Philippines)
PG	6	Kevin Alas	31 – 13 November 1991	1.83 m (6 ft 0 in)	NLEX Road Warriors	(Philippines)
SG	9	Scottie Thompson	30 – 12 July 1993	1.85 m (6 ft 1 in)	Barangay Ginebra San Miguel	(Philippines)
F	10	Arvin Tolentino	27 – 5 November 1995	1.96 m (6 ft 5 in)	NorthPort Batang Pier	(Philippines)
G	12	Chris Ross	38 – 9 March 1985	1.85 m (6 ft 1 in)	San Miguel Beermen	(Philippines)
G/F	13	Marcio Lassiter	36 – 16 May 1987	1.88 m (6 ft 2 in)	San Miguel Beermen	(Philippines)
C	15	June Mar Fajardo	33 – 17 November 1989	2.08 m (6 ft 10 in)	San Miguel Beermen	(Philippines)
G	17	CJ Perez	29 – 17 November 1993	1.88 m (6 ft 2 in)	San Miguel Beermen	(Philippines)
F	18	Calvin Oftana	27 – 3 January 1996	1.96 m (6 ft 5 in)	TNT Tropang Giga	(Philippines)
F	25	Japeth Aguilar (C)	36 – 25 January 1987	2.06 m (6 ft 9 in)	Barangay Ginebra San Miguel	(Philippines)
F	32	Justin Brownlee	35 – 23 April 1988	1.98 m (6 ft 6 in)	Barangay Ginebra San Miguel	(Philippines)
C	34	Ange Kouame	25 – 15 December 1997	2.08 m (6 ft 10 in)	Free agent

Head coach

- (United States) Tim Cone

Assistant coach(es)

- (Philippines) Richard del Rosario
- (Philippines) LA Tenorio
- (Philippines) Jong Uichico
- (Philippines) Josh Reyes

Legend

- (C) Team captain
- (NP) Naturalized player
- Club – describes last
  club before the tournament
- Age – describes age
  on 26 September 2023

Preliminary Rounds – Group C

Pos	Team	Pld	W	L	PF	PA	PD	Pts	Qualification
1	Jordan	3	3	0	268	185	+83	6	Quarterfinals
2	Philippines	3	2	1	238	220	+18	5	Qualification for quarterfinals
3	Bahrain	3	1	2	197	235	−38	4	Qualification for quarterfinals
4	Thailand	3	0	3	197	260	−63	3	

Source: OCA

26 September
13:30

Report

Philippines	89–61	Bahrain
Scoring by quarter: 22–18, 29–15, 21–14, 17–14
Pts: Perez, Kouame 15; Rebs: Brownlee 10; Asts: Lassiter 4		Pts: Jameel 14; Rebs: Chism 13; Asts: Jameel 3

Olympic Expo Center Gymnasium, Hangzhou
Referees: Paul Skayem (LBN), Taha Al-Hashedi (YEM), Li Chengxin (CHN)

28 September
11:00

Report

Thailand	72–87	Philippines
Scoring by quarter: 22–20, 13–21, 15–27, 22–19
Pts: Lamb 29; Rebs: Jakrawan, Klahan 6 Asts: Lish, J. Morgan 3		Pts: Brownlee 22; Rebs: Brownlee 15; Asts: Thompson 9

Zijingang Campus Gymnasium, Hangzhou
Referees: Yuen Chun Yip (HKG), Hu Jing (CHN), Mohammad Rajabi (IRI)

30 September
17:30

Report

Jordan	87–62	Philippines
Scoring by quarter: 16–13, 26–16, 17–23, 28–10
Pts: Hollis-Jefferson 24; Rebs: Bohannon 9 Asts: Hollis-Jefferson 9		Pts: Brownlee 24; Rebs: Thompson 11; Asts: Brownlee, Perez 3

Olympic Expo Center Gymnasium, Hangzhou
Referees: Yuen Chun Yip (HKG), Song Houlu (CHN), Issam Al-Siyabi (OMA)

Qualification to the Quarterfinals

2 October
16:00

Report

Philippines	80–41	Qatar
Scoring by quarter: 33–14, 24–9, 16–7, 7–11
Pts: Fajardo, Perez 12; Rebs: Kouame 10; Asts: Newsome 6		Pts: Muslić 12; Rebs: Ndao 8 Asts: four players 4

Zijingang Campus Gymnasium, Hangzhou
Referees: Wissam Zein (SYR), Hu Jing (CHN), Taha Al-Hashedi (YEM)

Quarterfinals

3 October
12:00

Report

Iran	83–84	Philippines
Scoring by quarter: 22–28, 14–20, 18–23, 29–13
Pts: Vahedi 24; Rebs: Kazemi 8 Asts: Rezaeifer 7		Pts: Brownlee 36; Rebs: Fajardo, Brownlee 8 Asts: Fajardo, Brownlee 4

Zijingang Campus Gymnasium, Hangzhou
Referees: Alexey Stepanenko (KAZ), Taha Al-Hashedi (YEM), Ahmad Al-Yousef (JOR)

Semifinals

4 October
20:00

Report

Philippines	77–76	China
Scoring by quarter: 17–19, 13–29, 20–14, 27–14
Pts: Brownlee 33; Rebs: Thompson 8 Asts: Perez, Brownlee 4		Pts: Zhao R. 18; Rebs: Zhu 8 Asts: Zhao R. 6

Olympic Expo Center Gymnasium, Hangzhou
Referees: Paul Skayem (LBN), Alexey Stepanenko (KAZ), Wissam Zein (SYR)

Finals

6 October
20:00

Report

Jordan	60–70	Philippines
Scoring by quarter: 12–17, 19–14, 10–20, 19–19
Pts: Hollis-Jefferson 24; Rebs: Al-Dwairi 15; Asts: Ibrahim, Hollis-Jefferson 5		Pts: Brownlee 20; Rebs: Kouame 11; Asts: Brownlee 5

Olympic Expo Center Gymnasium, Hangzhou
Referees: Harja Jaladri (INA), Yuen Chun Yip (HKG), Paul Skayem (LBN)

==== Women's tournament ====
The women's national team was aiming to reach at least the quarterfinals. They are able to do so, with South Korea eliminating them from the tournament in the quarterfinal.

Team roster

Philippines women's national basketball team roster
Players
Coaches

Pos.	No.	Name	Age – Date of birth	Height	Club	Ctr.
G	0	Khate Castillo	26 – 5 October 1996	1.62 m (5 ft 4 in)
F	3	Afril Bernardino	27 – 3 April 1996	1.72 m (5 ft 8 in)
	4	Camille Nolasco	18 – 26 February 2005		UP Lady Maroons	(Philippines)
G	6	France Cabinbin	29 – 6 December 1991	1.57 m (5 ft 2 in)
G	7	Janine Pontejos (C)	30 – 29 October 1992	1.65 m (5 ft 5 in)
G	9	Louna Ozar	19 – 9 May 2004	1.72 m (5 ft 8 in)	UP Lady Maroons	(Philippines)
G	11	Stefanie Berberabe	23 – 13 July 2000	1.60 m (5 ft 3 in)	Westmont Warriors	(United States)
G	12	Monique del Carmen	25 – 21 December 1997	1.70 m (5 ft 7 in)
F	13	Katrina Guytingco	26 – 22 August 1997	1.70 m (5 ft 7 in)
G	18	Marizze Tongco	27 – 18 October 1995	1.57 m (5 ft 2 in)
G	18	Mikka Chaco	25 – 19 January 1998	1.72 m (5 ft 8 in)

Head coach

- (Philippines) Patrick Aquino

Legend

- (C) Team captain
- Club – describes last
  club before the tournament
- Age describes age
  on 26 June 2023

Preliminary Rounds – Group B

Pos	Team	Pld	W	L	PF	PA	PD	Pts	Qualification
1	Japan	3	3	0	306	135	+171	6	Quarterfinals
2	Philippines	3	2	1	241	218	+23	5	Quarterfinals
3	Hong Kong	3	1	2	179	273	−94	4	
4	Kazakhstan	3	0	3	145	245	−100	3	

Source: OCA

27 September
17:30

Report

Philippines	83–59	Kazakhstan
Scoring by quarter: 17–17, 23–9, 20–15, 23–18
Pts: Pontejos 21; Rebs: Animam 14; Asts: Berberabe 6		Pts: Kuzmina, Bezgodova 12; Rebs: Bezgodova 10; Asts: Bagmet 4

Olympic Center Gymnasium, Shaoxing
Referees: Harja Jaladri (INA), Hu Jing (CHN), Haryanto Sutaryo (INA)

29 September
13:30

Report

Hong Kong	63–99	Philippines
Scoring by quarter: 20–19, 14–23, 12–23, 17–34
Pts: Tong 15; Rebs: Tong 6 Asts: Tsui 5		Pts: Pontejos 23; Rebs: Animam 22; Asts: Bernardino, Berberabe 6

Olympic Center Gymnasium, Shaoxing
Referees: Issam Al-Siyabi (OMA), Cheon Kam-jae (KOR), Mohammad Rajabi (IRI)

1 October
17:30

Report

Japan	96–59	Philippines
Scoring by quarter: 35–14, 15–12, 16–13, 30–20
Pts: Hirashita 26; Rebs: Akaho 9 Asts: Miyazaki 8		Pts: Pontejos 13; Rebs: Animam 7 Asts: Cabinbin 4

Olympic Expo Center Gymnasium, Hangzhou
Referees: Harja Jaladri (INA), Wissam Zein (SYR), Ahmed Al-Khamees (KSA)

Combined ranking

Pos	Team	Pld	W	L	GF	GA	GD	Pts	Qualification
1	Japan	3	3	0	306	135	+171	6	Quarterfinals
2	China	3	3	0	313	151	+162	6	Quarterfinals
3	South Korea	3	3	0	258	177	+81	6	Quarterfinals
4	North Korea	3	2	1	258	207	+51	5	Quarterfinals
5	Philippines	3	2	1	241	218	+23	5	Quarterfinals
6	India	3	2	1	187	219	−32	5	Quarterfinals
7	Chinese Taipei	3	1	2	194	232	−38	4	Quarterfinals
8	Indonesia	3	1	2	167	231	−64	4	Quarterfinals
9	Hong Kong	3	1	2	179	273	−94	4	
10	Mongolia	3	0	3	172	238	−66	3	
11	Thailand	3	0	3	159	253	−94	3	
12	Kazakhstan	3	0	3	145	245	−100	3	

Source: OCA

Quarterfinals

2 October
20:00

Report

South Korea	93–71	Philippines
Scoring by quarter: 23–13, 23–19, 24–23, 23–16
Pts: Kang L., Park J.S. 15; Rebs: Park J.H., Jin 8 Asts: Lee K. 7		Pts: Castillo 18; Rebs: Animam 14; Asts: Bernardino 5

Olympic Center Gymnasium, Shaoxing
Referees: Mohamed Al-Salam (BRN), Li Chengxin (CHN), Fang Wenxuan (CHN)

=== 3x3 basketball ===
==== Men's tournament ====
Team roster

Philippines men's national 3x3 team – 2022 Asian Games roster
Players
Coaches

Pos.	No.	Name	Age – Date of birth	Height	Club	Ctr.
	—	Justine Sanchez	22 – 20 May 2001	1.85 m (6 ft 1 in)	San Beda Red Lions	(Philippines)
	—	John Ray Pasaol	20 – 11 July 2003	1.78 m (5 ft 10 in)	FEU–D Baby Tamaraws	(Philippines)
	—	Bismarck Lina	22 – 14 March 2001	1.98 m (6 ft 6 in)	UST Tiger Cubs	(Philippines)
	—	John Bryan Sajonia	22 – 14 March 2001	1.98 m (6 ft 6 in)	San Beda Red Lions	(Philippines)

Head coach

- (Philippines) Lester Del Rosario

Legend

- (C) Team captain
- Club – describes last
  club before the tournament
- Age – describes age
  on September 25, 2023

Source: Daily Tribune / HAGOC

Preliminary Rounds – Group A

Pos	Team	Pld	W	L	PF	PA	PD	Qualification
1	Mongolia	4	3 (Note: Tied on head-to-head wins (1). Teams were ranked by their points scored.)	1	75	62	+13	Quarterfinals
2	Chinese Taipei	4	3	1	73	52	+21	Qualification for quarterfinals
3	Philippines	4	3	1	63	56	+7	Qualification for quarterfinals
4	Hong Kong	4	1	3	67	73	−6	
5	Jordan	4	0	4	37	72	−35	

Source: FIBA
Notes:

25 September
13:00

Jordan	8–13	Philippines
Pts: Dajani 3		Pts: Sajonia 6

Deqing Geographic Information Park, Huzhou
Referees: Su (TPE), Shi (CHN)

26 September
17:00

Philippines	17–12	Chinese Taipei
Pts: Sajonia 6		Pts: Chiang 4

Deqing Geographic Information Park, Huzhou
Referees: Liu (MAS), Kim (KOR)

27 September
16:20

Hong Kong	15–21	Philippines
Pts: Wong, Tsang 5		Pts: Lina, Pasaol 7

Deqing Geographic Information Park, Huzhou
Referees: Ibragimow (TKM), Liu (MAS)

29 September
16:20

Philippines	12–21	Mongolia
Pts: Lina 7		Pts: Batzayaa 8

Deqing Geographic Information Park, Huzhou
Referees: Rulyov (KAZ), Shi (CHN)

Qualification for Quarterfinals

30 September
15:55

Kazakhstan	14–15	Philippines
Pts: Samsin 8		Pts: Pasaol 5

Deqing Geographic Information Park, Huzhou
Referees: Liu (MAS), Nagoshi (JPN)

Quarterfinals

30 September
20:55

South Korea	19–16	Philippines
Pts: Lee W. 7		Pts: Pasaol 6

Deqing Geographic Information Park, Huzhou
Referees: Shi (CHN), Su (TPE)

==== Women's tournament ====
The Philippine women's 3x3 is among the teams subject to last-minute roster change appeals. Cielo Pagdulagan and Marga Villanueva were proposed as replacements for Camille Clarin and Angel Surada. The appeal was denied leaving the team with just two players, which forced the team to withdraw.

Team roster

Philippines women's national 3x3 team – 2022 Asian Games roster
Players
Coaches

Pos.	No.	Name	Age – Date of birth	Height	Club	Ctr.
	—	Camille Clarin	22 – 28 May 2001	1.75 m (5 ft 9 in)	NU Lady Bulldogs	(Philippines)
	—	Dianne Camille Nolasco	18 – 26 February 2005	1.65 m (5 ft 5 in)	Miriam College	(Philippines)
	—	Angelica Surada	22 – 5 May 2001	1.80 m (5 ft 11 in)	Chiang Kai Shek College	(Philippines)
	—	Louna Ozar	19 – 9 May 2004	1.75 m (5 ft 9 in)	UP Fighting Maroons	(Philippines)

Head coach

- (Philippines) Patrick Aquino

Legend

- (C) Team captain
- Club – describes last
  club before the tournament
- Age – describes age
  on September 25, 2023

Source: HAGOC

Pos	Team	Pld	W	L	PF	PA	PD	Qualification
1	Mongolia	3	3	0	41	24	+17	Quarterfinals
2	Jordan	3	2	1	26	33	−7	Qualification for quarterfinals
3	Hong Kong	3	1	2	28	38	−10	Qualification for quarterfinals
—	Philippines	3	0	3	0	0	0	

Source: FIBA

== Boxing ==
The Philippines has six male and four female athletes competing in boxing at the 2022 Asian Games. Eumir Marcial won the sole boxing medal for the Philippines – a silver. He also qualified for the 2024 Summer Olympics in Paris by virtue of being a finalist.

Men

Athlete	Event	Round of 32	Round of 16	Quarterfinals	Semifinals	Final	Rank
Athlete	Event	Opposition Result	Opposition Result	Opposition Result	Opposition Result	Opposition Result	Rank
Aaron Jude Bado	51 kg	Panmod (THA); L RSC–I R2	Did not advance				
Carlo Paalam	57 kg	Abu Jajeh (JOR); W 5–0	Seitbek Uulu (KGZ); W 4–1	Khalokov (UZB); L 0–5	Did not advance		
Mark Ashley Fajardo	63.5 kg	Wangdi (BHU); W KO R1	Wang X. (CHN); L 0–5	Did not advance			
Marjon Pianar	71 kg	Bye	Muydinkhujaev (UZB); L 0–5	Did not advance			
Eumir Marcial	80 kg	Dalai (MGL); W 5–0	Nguyễn M.C. (VIE); W 5–0	Jongjoho (THA); W KO R2	Ghousoon (SYR); W KO R2	Tanglatihan (CHN); L 0–5	2nd place, silver medalist(s)
John Nobel Marvin	92 kg	—N/a	Nepal (NEP); W RSC R2	Jeong J.M. (KOR); L RSC R1	Did not advance		

Women

Athlete	Event	Round of 32	Round of 16	Quarterfinals	Semifinals	Final	Rank
Athlete	Event	Opposition Result	Opposition Result	Opposition Result	Opposition Result	Opposition Result	Rank
Aira Villegas	50 kg	Yesugen (MGL); L 1–3	Did not advance				
Irish Magno	54 kg	—N/a	Uktamova (UZB); L 5–0	Did not advance			
Nesthy Petecio	57 kg	—N/a	Lin Y.T. (TPE); L 1–4	Did not advance			
Riza Pasuit	60 kg	Bye	Somnuek (THA); L wo	Did not advance			

== Bridge ==
Athlete	Event	Qualifying Rounds																						Total	Rank	Semifinals						Rank	Final			Final Rank
Athlete	Event	Round 1											Round 2											Total	Rank	Round 1	Round 2	Round 3	Round 4	Round 5	Round 6	Rank	Round 1	Round 2	Round 3	Final Rank
Athlete	Event	Match 1	Match 2	Match 3	Match 4	Match 5	Match 6	Match 7	Match 8	Match 9	Match 10	Match 11	Match 1	Match 2	Match 3	Match 4	Match 5	Match 6	Match 7	Match 8	Match 9	Match 10	Match 11	Total	Rank	Round 1	Round 2	Round 3	Round 4	Round 5	Round 6	Rank	Round 1	Round 2	Round 3	Final Rank
Kevin Catbagan; Homer de Vera; Andrew Falcon; Reniel Refe; George Soo; Jaycee Urriquia	Men's Team	India (IND); L 1.96–18.04	Hong Kong (HKG); L 9.67–10.33	Thailand (THA); L 4.15–15.85	Pakistan (PAK); W 15.06–4.94	Chinese Taipei (TPE); W 5.81–14.19	China (CHN); L 6.52–13.48	Singapore (SGP); L 0.62–19.38	Bye	South Korea (KOR); L 3.97–16.03	Bangladesh (BAN); L 1.83–18.17	Japan (JPN); L 1.47–18.53	India (IND); L 1.35–18.65	Japan (JPN); W 11.58–8.42	Singapore (SGP); L 2.81–17.19	Chinese Taipei (TPE); L 2.23–17.77	China (CHN); W 12.44–7.56	Hong Kong (HKG); L 1.02–18.98	Pakistan (PAK); W 13.23–6.77	South Korea (KOR); L 4.94–15.06	Bangladesh (BAN); L 0.00–20.00	Bangladesh (BAN); L 7.29–12.71	Bye	131.95	11	Did not advance										
Francisco Alquiros; Mary Cristy de Guzman; Felipe Manalang; Suena Manalang; Gemma Mariano; Romulo Virola	Mixed Team	Pakistan (PAK); W 10.33–9.67	Thailand (THA); L 3.97–16.03	Singapore (SGP); L 2.09–17.91	India (IND); W 12.44–7.56	Japan (JPN); L 5.15–14.85	China (CHN); L 3.97–16.03	Indonesia (INA); L 0.00–20.00	Bye	Hong Kong (HKG); L 8.42–11.58	Chinese Taipei (TPE); W 15.85–4.15	South Korea (KOR); W 13.23–6.77	China (CHN); L 6.77–13.23	Hong Kong (HKG); W 17.91–2.09	Thailand (THA); L 6.77–13.23	Chinese Taipei (TPE); L 0.92–19.08	India (IND); L 4.94–15.06	Singapore (SGP); L 6.77–13.23	Indonesia (INA); L 6.04–13.96	Bye	Pakistan (PAK); L 8.42–11.58	Japan (JPN); L 2.51–17.49	South Korea (KOR); W 12.71–7.29	173.21	9	Did not advance										

== Breakdancing ==
Athlete	Event	Preliminary		Groups					Quarterfinals	Semifinals	Finals	
Athlete	Event	Result	Rank	Opposition Score	Opposition Score	Opposition Score	Result	Rank	Opposition Score	Opposition Score	Result	Rank
Ronald Nico Ruadap	B-Boys	354.00	22	Did not advance								
Yer Lord Ilyvm Gabriel	B-Boys	462.30	21	Did not advance								
Alyanna Talam	B-Girls	557.90	13 Q	Suthisiri (THA); L 0–2	Kwon S.H. (KOR); L 0–2	Zeng Y. (CHN); L 0–2	8 votes	4	Did not advance			

== Canoeing ==
=== Sprint ===
Athlete	Event	Heats		Semifinal		Final	
Athlete	Event	Best	Rank	Time	Rank	Time	Rank
Ojay Fuentes; John Paul Selencio	Men's C-2 500	1:59.900	4 SF	1:57.855	4	Did not advance	

== Chess ==
Men's

Athlete	Event	Round 1	Round 2	Round 3	Round 4	Round 5	Round 6	Round 7	Round 8	Round 9	Final Score	Rank
Paulo Bersamina	Individual	Erigaisi (IND); L 0–1	Kulpruethanon (THA); W 1–0	Rahman (BAN); W 1–0	Jumabayev (KAZ); W 1–0	Bu X. (CHN); L 0–1	Maghsoudloo (IRI); D 0.5–0.5	Hossain (BAN); D 0.5–0.5	de Silva (SRI); W 1–0	Tabatabaei (IRI); L 0–1	5.0	9
Paulo Bersamina; Jan Emmanuel Garcia; John Paul Gomez; Darwin Laylo	Team	China (CHN); L 1.0–3.0	South Korea (KOR); W 3.0–1.0	Mongolia (MGL); L 0.5–3.5	Bye	Thailand (THA); L 1.5–2.5	Hong Kong (HKG); W 4.0–0.0	Bangladesh (BAN); W 2.5–1.5	Iran (IRI); L 1.0–3.0	India (IND); L 0.5-3.5	7.0	8

Women's

Athlete	Event	Round 1	Round 2	Round 3	Round 4	Round 5	Round 6	Round 7	Round 8	Round 9	Final Score	Rank
Janelle Mae Frayna	Individual	Abdumalik (KAZ); W 1–0	San Diego (PHI); D 0.5–0.5	Aulia (INA); L 0–1	Törmönkhiin (MGL); D 0.5–0.5	Phạm L.T.N. (VIE); W 1–0	Alinasabalamdari (IRI); D 0.5–0.5	Sukandar (INA); L 0–1	Alali (UAE); W 1–0	Feng (HKG); W 1–0	5.5	9
Marie Antoinette San Diego	Individual	Hou Y. (CHN); L 0–1	Frayna (PHI); D 0.5–0.5	Al-Khelaifi (QAT); W 1–0	Feng (HKG); L 0–1	Alali (UAE); L 0–1	Prommuang (THA); W 1–0	Gong Q. (SGP); L 0–1	Liu T.Y. (HKG); W 1–0	Seo J.W. (KOR); W 1–0	4.5	19
Janelle Mae Frayna; Jan Jodilyn Fronda; Bernadette Galas; Shania Mae Mendoza; Marie Antoinette San Diego	Team	India (IND); L 0.5–3.5	Uzbekistan (UZB); D 2.0–2.0	Hong Kong (HKG); W 4.0–0.0	Indonesia (INA); D 2.0–2.0	South Korea (KOR); W 4.0–0.0	Kazakhstan (KAZ); L 0.5–3.5	United Arab Emirates (UAE); W 2.5–1.5	China (CHN); L 0.0–4.0	Thailand (THA); W 3.5–0.5	10.0	7

== Cycling ==
Patrick Coo won a bronze in BMX race for the Philippines. Ariana Evangelista was disqualified after failing a routine doping test. Evangelista denied having committed any wrongdoing and underwent a B-sample test.

=== BMX ===
Athlete	Event	Time Trial Run		Motos									Final	
Athlete	Event	Time	Rank	Heat	Run 1		Run 2		Run 3		Points	Rank	Time	Rank
Athlete	Event	Time	Rank	Heat	Time	Rank	Time	Rank	Time	Rank	Points	Rank	Time	Rank
Daniel Caluag	Men's BMX race	40.163	6	2	40.069	2	40.405	4	41.662	6	12	4 Q	40.433	6
Patrick Coo	Men's BMX race	40.073	5	1	1:16.965	6	39.624	2	39.870	2	10	2 Q	39.076	3rd place, bronze medalist(s)

=== Mountain bike ===
Athlete	Event	Lap 1		Lap 2		Lap 3		Final	
Athlete	Event	Time	Rank	Time	Rank	Time	Rank	Time	Rank
Edmhel John Flores	Men's cross-country	Did not start							
Jerico Rivera	Men's cross-country	Did not start							
Ariana Evangelista	Women's cross-country	26:38	9	—N/a				–2LAP	DSQ
Shagne Yaoyao	Women's cross-country	26:39	10	54:32	9	10:07	8	1:57:22	7

=== Road ===
Athlete	Event	Final	
Athlete	Event	Time	Rank
Jonel Carcueva	Men's road race	Did not finish	
Ronald Oranza	Men's road race	Over Time Limit	
Joshua Pascual	Men's road race	Over Time Limit	

== Esports ==
The Philippine national esports team failed to win any medal at the 2022 Asian Games.

Dota 2 was projected as the best chance of the national esports team for a medal. Polaris Esports with a reinforcement from Bleed Esports formed the Philippine Dota 2 squad. The Dreams Three Kingdoms 2 team was composed of Zen Esports members who typically play Mobile Legends: Bang Bang, since DtK2 is not available in the Philippines. The Peacekeeper Elite team consists of both Playbook Esports and Infamous PRO players.

The Dreams Three Kingdoms 2 team was the best finishing team, the only team to advance to the playoffs.

Team rosters

Philippines national esports team – 2022 Asian Games roster
Players
Coaches

Name	Game	Team
	Arena of Valor	—
	Arena of Valor	(Philippines) Fennel
	Arena of Valor	—
	Arena of Valor	(Philippines) Fennel
	Arena of Valor	(Philippines) Fennel
	Arena of Valor	—
	Dota 2	(Philippines) Polaris
	Dota 2	(Philippines) Polaris
	Dota 2	(Philippines) Polaris
	Dota 2	(Philippines) Polaris
	Dota 2	(Philippines) Polaris
	Dota 2	(Singapore) Bleed
	Dream Three Kingdoms 2	(Philippines) Zen Esports
	Dream Three Kingdoms 2	(Philippines) Zen Esports
	Dream Three Kingdoms 2	(Philippines) Zen
	Dream Three Kingdoms 2	(Philippines) Zen
	Dream Three Kingdoms 2	(Philippines) Zen
	Dream Three Kingdoms 2	(Philippines) Zen
	EA Sports FC Online	—
	Peacekeeper Elite	(Philippines) PlayBook
	Peacekeeper Elite	—
	Peacekeeper Elite	—
	Peacekeeper Elite	—
	Peacekeeper Elite	—
	Street Fighter V	—

Legend

- Team – describes last
  team before the tournament

Team

Athlete	Event	Group Stage			Round 32	Round 16	Quarterfinals	Semifinals	Final / BM	
Athlete	Event	Opposition Score	Opposition Score	Rank	Opposition Score	Opposition Score	Opposition Score	Opposition Score	Opposition Score	Rank
Miguel Klarenz Banaag; Dragon Heart Dajao; Maynard Limon; Eleazar Salle; Cedrik Santos; Alfonso Marcus Valmores	Arena of Valor	Thailand (THA); L 0–1	—N/a	2	Did not advance					
Bryle Jacob Alvizo; Eljohn Andales; Michael Roi Ladines; Djardel Jicko Mampusti; Marvin Salvador Rushton; McNicholson Villanueva	Dota 2	India (IND); W 1–0	Kyrgyzstan (KGZ); L 0–1	2	Did not advance					
Robert de Guzman; Manjean Faldas; Mark Adrian Jison; Caisam Yvez Nopueto; Shin Boo Ponferrada; John Agustin Karl To	Dream Three Kingdoms 2	Uzbekistan (UZB); W 1–0	Kazakhstan (KAZ); L 0–1	2 Q	—N/a		Hong Kong (HKG); L 0–2	Did not advance		
Abdul Barode; Jon Michael Ross Cabig; Francis Carl Fusingan; Alen Dale Origenes; Florenz Anthony Taleon	Peacekeeper Elite	01:02:48.644; 4th	01:00:12.708; 2nd	—N/a			01:01:33.137; 4th	Did not advance		

Individual

Athlete	Event	Qualification	Opening Round	WR1 / LR1	WR2 / LR2	WR3 / LR3	LR4	LR5	LR6	LR7	WBF / LBF	Final
Athlete	Event	Opposition Score	Opposition Score	Opposition Score	Opposition Score	Opposition Score	Opposition Score	Opposition Score	Opposition Score	Opposition Score	Opposition Score	Rank
Jorrel Aristorenas	EA Sports FC Online	Bye	Alrowaihi (BRN); L 0–2	Singh (IND); L 0–2	Did not advance							
Ross Jhan Villarin	Street Fighter V	Bye	Chantasriviroje (THA); L 0–2	Nuzair (MDV); W 2–0	Chantasriviroje (THA); L 0–2	Did not advance						

== Fencing ==
Men's

Athlete	Event	Round of Pool		Round of 32	Round of 16	Quarterfinals	Semifinals	Final	
Athlete	Event	Result	Rank	Opposition Score	Opposition Score	Opposition Score	Opposition Score	Opposition Score	Rank
Jian Bautista	Individual épée	Nguyễn T.N. (VIE); W 5–1; Kim J.W. (KOR); L 3–5; Wang Z. (CHN); L 1–5; Almane (KUW); W 5–4; Alhussain (KSA); L 4–5	3 Q	Nurmatov (UZB); L 13–15	Did not advance				
Noelito Jose Jr.	Individual épée	Alzarooni (UAE); W 5–3; Petrov (KGZ); W 5–3; Nguyễn P.Đ. (VIE); L 2–5; Komata (JPN); L 2–5; Kweon Y.J. (KOR); L 3–5	4 Q	Petrov (KGZ); W 15–13	Wang Z. (CHN); W 15–12	Ho W.H. (HKG); L 10–15	Did not advance		
Samuel Tranquilan	Individual foil	Wangpaisit (THA); W 5–2; Lee K.H. (KOR); L 3–5; Khalifa (QAT); L 1–5; Abbas (KUW); W 5–2; Xu J. (CHN); L 1–5	4 Q	Asranov (UZB); L 12–15	Did not advance				
Jian Bautista; Noelito Jose Jr. Samuel Tranquilan	Team épée	—N/a		Vietnam; L 29–45	Did not advance				

Women's

Athlete	Event	Round of Pool		Round of 32	Round of 16	Quarterfinals	Semifinals	Final	
Athlete	Event	Result	Rank	Opposition Score	Opposition Score	Opposition Score	Opposition Score	Opposition Score	Rank
Ivy Claire Dinoy	Individual épée	Khatri (IND); L 1–5; Koh (SGP); L 3–5; Song S.R. (KOR); L 0–5; Ochirkhuyag (MGL); W 5–2; Alshami (YEM); W 5–0	4 Q	Alboub (JOR); L 13–15	Did not advance				
Juliana Gomez	Individual épée	Batsaikhan (MGL); W 5–2; Xu N. (CHN); L 0–5; Kong (HKG); L 2–5; Nikolaichuk (KAZ); L 3–5; Alboub (JOR); L 2–5	5 Q	Xu N. (CHN); L 8–15	Did not advance				
Jylyn Nicanor	Individual sabre	Ozaki (JPN); L 3–5; Sarybay (KAZ); W 5–1; Phokaew (THA); L 4–5; Shao Y. (CHN); L 2–5	4 Q	Phokaew (THA); L 7–15	Did not advance				

== Football ==
The Philippine Football Federation only sent the women's national team for the Asian Games. The national team is mostly consist of players who played in the 2023 FIFA Women's World Cup.

This was their first ever participation in the continental games. They would win 3–1 in their opener against Hong Kong, but would lose 1–5 to South Korea. They would have to win against Myanmar and hope to be among the best three runner-up teams in the group stage. They are able to scoring the only three goals in their match against Myanmar to advance to the quarterfinals

They would face Japan in the quarterfinal. The Japanese squad is mostly different from the one that played in the 2023 World Cup. In the match which saw rainy weather, the Philippines would be reduced to ten players with captain Hali Long receiving a red card for a foul in the 27th minute. Japan would end the Philippines bid for a medal with a 8–1 victory.

Summary

Key:

- A.E.T – After extra time.
- P – Match decided by penalty-shootout.

Team	Event	Group Stage				Quarterfinals	Semifinals	Final / BM	
Team	Event	Opposition Score	Opposition Score	Opposition Score	Rank	Opposition Score	Opposition Score	Opposition Score	Rank
Philippines women's	Women's tournament	Hong Kong; W 3–1	South Korea; L 1–5	Myanmar; W 3–0	2 Q	Japan; L 1–8	Did not advance		

=== Women's tournament ===
Team roster

The following 21 players are included in the squad for the 2022 Asian Games.

No.	Pos.	Player	Date of birth (age)	Caps	Goals	Club
1	GK	Olivia McDaniel	14 October 1997 (aged 25)	31	0	(Austrian Football Association) Pinzgau Saalfelden
18	GK	Inna Palacios	8 February 1994 (aged 29)	52	0	(Philippine Football Federation) Kaya–Iloilo
22	GK	Kiara Fontanilla	1 July 2000 (aged 23)	9	0	(Football Australia) Central Coast Mariners
3	DF	Jessika Cowart	30 October 1999 (aged 23)	21	2	(Football Australia) Perth Glory
5	DF	Hali Long (captain)	21 January 1995 (aged 28)	76	18	(Philippine Football Federation) Kaya–Iloilo
9	DF	Reina Bonta	17 April 1999 (aged 24)	11	0	(Brazilian Football Confederation) Santos
16	DF	Sofia Harrison	16 February 1999 (aged 24)	37	3	Unattached
19	DF	Eva Madarang	13 September 1997 (aged 26)	54	12	(Football Australia) Blacktown Spartans
2	MF	Natalie Oca	28 October 2003 (aged 19)	0	0	(United States Soccer Federation) Loyola Marymount Lions
4	MF	Jaclyn Sawicki	14 November 1992 (aged 30)	23	0	(Football Australia) Western United
6	MF	Isabella Pasion	28 November 2006 (aged 16)	5	0	(United States Soccer Federation) Lebanon Trail High School
8	MF	Sara Eggesvik	29 April 1997 (aged 26)	24	3	(Norwegian Football Federation) KIL/Hemne
11	MF	Anicka Castañeda	16 December 1999 (aged 23)	38	11	(Football Australia) Mt Druitt Town Rangers
12	MF	Kaya Hawkinson	17 April 2000 (aged 23)	15	1	(Football Australia) Central Coast Mariners
15	MF	Camille Rodriguez	27 December 1994 (aged 28)	42	11	(Philippine Football Federation) Kaya–Iloilo
20	MF	Quinley Quezada	7 April 1997 (aged 26)	51	22	(Football Australia) Perth Glory
7	FW	Sarina Bolden	30 June 1996 (aged 27)	39	22	(Football Australia) Western Sydney Wanderers
10	FW	Chandler McDaniel	4 February 1998 (aged 25)	15	5	(Austrian Football Association) Pinzgau Saalfelden
14	FW	Meryll Serrano	20 July 1997 (aged 26)	10	4	(Norwegian Football Federation) Stabæk
17	FW	Alisha del Campo	20 September 1999 (aged 24)	25	11	(Philippine Football Federation) DLSU Lady Booters
21	FW	Katrina Guillou	19 December 1993 (aged 29)	27	10	(Swedish Football Association) Piteå

Group play

Pos	Team	Pld	W	D	L	GF	GA	GD	Pts	Qualification
1	South Korea	3	3	0	0	13	1	+12	9	Knockout stage
2	Philippines	3	2	0	1	7	6	+1	6	Knockout stage
3	Myanmar	3	1	0	2	1	6	−5	3	
4	Hong Kong	3	0	0	3	1	9	−8	0	

Source: Football – Women – Groups
Rules for classification: Group stage tiebreakers
22 September 2023
16:00 UTC+8

Hong Kong	1–3	Philippines
Cheung Wai Ki 38'	Report	Bolden 8' (pen.); Quezada 89'; Guillou 90+1'

Wenzhou Sports Center Stadium, Wenzhou
Attendance: 2,552
Referee: Lara Christie Lee (Australia)
25 September 2023
19:30 UTC+8

Philippines	1–5	South Korea
Bolden 8'	Report	Chun Ga-ram 12'; Son Hwa-yeon 44', 56', 70'; Ji So-yun 52' (pen.)

Wenzhou Sports Center Stadium, Wenzhou
Attendance: 2,974
Referee: Asaka Koizumi (Japan)
28 September 2023
19:30 UTC+8

Philippines	3–0	Myanmar
Bolden 19' (pen.); Eggesvik 60', 61'	Report

Wenzhou Sports Center Stadium, Wenzhou
Attendance: 4,436
Referee: Asaka Koizumi (Japan)

Quarterfinals

30 September 2023
19:30 UTC+8

Japan	8–1	Philippines
Tanikawa 40' (pen.); Osawa 58', 90+4'; Chiba 65'; Ueno 76' (pen.), 78', 81', 90+1'	Report	Bolden 68'

Wenzhou Sports Centre, Wenzhou
Attendance: 33,607
Referee: Casey Reibelt (Australia)

== Golf ==
The Philippine delegation has four male and two female golfers. The Philippines filed a rejected bid to replace Princess Superal with Chanelle Avaricio with the latter begging off from the games due to scheduling conflict with her pro tournaments. The organizing committee only allows replacement for medical reasons. No golfers won a medal.

Men

Athlete	Event	Round 1	Round 2	Round 3	Round 4	Total	Par	Rank
Ira Alido	Individual	72	71	71	75	289	+1	T37
Aidric Chan	Individual	71	73	Did not advance				
Carl Jano Corpus	Individual	71	68	72	76	287	−1	33
Clyde Mondilla	Individual	65	70	68	70	273	−15	T10
Ira Alido; Aidric Chan; Carl Jano Corpus; Clyde Mondilla	Team	207	209	210	218	844	−20	9

Women

Athlete	Event	Round 1	Round 2	Round 3	Round 4	Total	Par	Rank
Lois Kaye Go	Individual	72	76	Did not advance				
Rianne Malixi	Individual	68	70	73	71	282	−6	T11
Lois Kaye Go; Rianne Malixi	Team	140	146	Did not advance				

== Gymnastics ==
=== Artistic ===
Men's

Athlete	Event	Qualification								Final							
Athlete	Event	Apparatus						Total	Rank	Apparatus						Total	Rank
Athlete	Event	F	PH	R	V	PB	HB	Total	Rank	F	PH	R	V	PB	HB	Total	Rank
Miguel Besana	Vault	—N/a			13.966	—N/a		13.966	21 R	Did not advance							
Justine Ace de Leon	Floor Exercise	13.000	—N/a					13.000	23	Did not advance							
Justine Ace de Leon	Vault	—N/a			13.933	—N/a		13.933	22	Did not advance							

Women's

Athlete	Event	Qualification						Final					
Athlete	Event	Apparatus				Total	Rank	Apparatus				Total	Rank
Athlete	Event	V	UB	B	F	Total	Rank	V	UB	B	F	Total	Rank
Kursten Lopez	All-Round	11.900	9.033	11.266	11.366	43.565	25 Q	12.166	10.033	11.366	10.766	44.331	13
Kursten Lopez	Uneven Bars	—N/a	9.033	—N/a		9.033	30	Did not advance					
Kursten Lopez	Balance Beam	—N/a		11.266	—N/a	11.266	26	Did not advance					
Kursten Lopez	Floor Exercise	—N/a			11.366	11.366	28	Did not advance					
Samantha Macasu	Uneven Bars	—N/a	10.666	—N/a		10.666	21	Did not advance					
Ancila Lucia Manzano	Vault	12.583	—N/a			12.583	8 Q	12.366	—N/a			12.366	7
Ancila Lucia Manzano	Balance Beam	—N/a		9.400	—N/a	9.400	33	Did not advance					
Ancila Lucia Manzano	Floor Exercise	—N/a			11.700	11.700	24	Did not advance					

=== Rhythmic ===
Athlete	Event	Qualification						Final					
Athlete	Event	Hoop	Ball	Clubs	Ribbon	Total	Rank	Hoop	Ball	Clubs	Ribbon	Total	Rank
Breanna Labadan	All-around	30.150 (10)	25.500 (21)	28.200 (13)	27.950 (14)	86.600	12 Q	29.950 (10)	26.250 (14)	28.500 (10)	26.550 (14)	111.250	12

== Judo ==
Filipino judokas were unable to win any medal in the 2022 Asian Games.

Men's

Athlete	Event	Round of 32	Round of 16	Quarterfinals	Semifinals	Repechage	Final/BM	Rank
Athlete	Event	Opposition Result	Opposition Result	Opposition Result	Opposition Result	Opposition Result	Opposition Result	Rank
Shugen Nakano	66 kg	Alamiri (KUW); W 10–00s3	Tanaka (JPN); L 00s2–10	Did not advance				
Keisei Nakano	73 kg	Bye	Khojazoda (TJK); L 00s2–10	Did not advance				
John Viron Ferrer	81 kg	Saru (NEP); W 10s1–00s3	Gereltuya (MGL); L 00s2–10s1	Did not advance				
Carl Dave Aseneta	100 kg	—N/a	Won J.H. (KOR); L 00s2–10s1	Did not advance				

Women's

Athlete	Event	Round of 32	Round of 16	Quarterfinals	Semifinals	Repechage	Final/BM	Rank
Athlete	Event	Opposition Result	Opposition Result	Opposition Result	Opposition Result	Opposition Result	Opposition Result	Rank
Leah Jhane Lopez	48 kg	—N/a	Abuzhakynova (KAZ); L 00s1–01s1	Did not advance				
Rena Furukawa	57 kg	—N/a	Tamaoki (JPN); L 00–10	Did not advance				
Kiyomi Watanabe	63 kg	—N/a	Nguyễn N.D. (VIE); W 11s1–01s3	Tashiro (JPN); L 00–10	Did not advance	Kuyulova (KAZ); L 00–10	Did not advance	
Ryoko Salinas	70 kg	Choudhary (IND); W 10–00s1	Tanaka (JPN); L 00–10	Did not advance	Liao Y.J. (TPE); L 00s1–10	Did not advance		
Dylwynn Gimena	78 kg	—N/a	Otgonbayar (MGL); L 00–10	Did not advance				

Mixed

Athlete	Event	Round of 16	Quarterfinals	Semifinals	Repechage	Final/BM	Rank
Athlete	Event	Opposition Result	Opposition Result	Opposition Result	Opposition Result	Opposition Result	Rank
Carl Dave Aseneta; John Viron Ferrer; Rena Furukawa; Dylwynn Gimena; Keisei Nakano; Shugen Nakano; Ryoko Salinas; Kiyomi Watanabe	Team	Thailand (THA); L 0–4	Did not advance				

== Ju-jitsu ==
Men

Athlete	Event	1/16 Finals	1/8 Finals	1/4 Finals	Final of Tables	Final/BM	Rank
Athlete	Event	Opposition Result	Opposition Result	Opposition Result	Opposition Result	Opposition Result	Rank
Marc Alexander Lim	62 kg	Amirul (SGP); W 3–2	Ajaj (PLE); W 2–0	Almurdhi (KSA); L SUB	Nortayev (KAZ); W 3–0	Khabibulla (KAZ); L 2–6	4
Myron Mangubat	62 kg	Ulziitogtokh (MGL); L 2–2 ADV	Did not advance				
Michael Tiu	69 kg	Alnajjar (BRN); W OWO	Serik (KAZ); L SUB	Did not advance			
Gerald Gallos	77 kg	Batsukh (MGL); L 0–10	Did not advance				
Dean Michael Roxas	85 kg	Aunjai (THA); W SUB	Al-Ketbi (UAE); L 0–7	Did not advance			

Women

Athlete	Event	1/16 Finals	1/8 Finals	1/4 Finals	Final of Tables	Final/BM	Rank
Athlete	Event	Opposition Result	Opposition Result	Opposition Result	Opposition Result	Opposition Result	Rank
Jollirine Co	48 kg	Bye	Tan (THA); L 0–2	Did not advance			
Meggie Ochoa	48 kg	Bye	Batbayar (MGL); W SUB	Rakhayeva (KAZ); W SUB	Tan (THA); W 4–2	Abdulla (UAE); W ADV	1st place, gold medalist(s)
Kaila Napolis	52 kg	Bye	Zhurabekova (KAZ); W 2–0	Park J.H. (KOR); W 2–0	Alhosami (UAE); L 0–2	Alshamsi (UAE); W 4–2	3rd place, bronze medalist(s)
Mariella Rafael	52 kg	Putri Siti Nur Farhani (SGP); W SUB	Alshamsi (UAE); L SUB	Did not advance			
Annie Ramirez	57 kg	Bye	Lê T.T. (VIE); W ADV	Toh (SGP); W 7–0	Alameri (UAE); W SUB	Duvanova (KAZ); W 2–0	1st place, gold medalist(s)
Andrea Lois Lao	63 kg	—N/a	Kakish (JOR); W ADV	Urdabayeva (KAZ); L 0–3	Mahfoodh (UAE); W SUB	Choi H.J. (KOR); L 0–4	4

== Karate ==
Eight karatekas (four men and four women) will compete to represent the country in the sport.

=== Men ===
Athlete	Event	1/16 Finals	1/8 Finals	Quarterfinals	Repechage	Semifinals/ Repechage 2	Finals/BM	Rank
Athlete	Event	Opposition Result	Opposition Result	Opposition Result	Opposition Result	Opposition Result	Opposition Result	Rank
John Christian Lachica	Kumite -60 kg	Bye	Dahlan (BRU); W 3–1	Saputra (INA); L 1–4	Did not advance			
John Matthew Manantan	Kumite -67 kg	Bye	Shih-Ch.Ch. (TPE); L 2-4	Did not advance				
Alwyn Balican	Kumite -75 kg	Leong O.T. (MAC); W 5–0	Masarweh (JOR); L 3–7	—N/a	Bye	Kandou (INA); L 3–5	Did not advance	

=== Women ===
Athlete	Event	1/8 Finals	Quarterfinals	Repechage	Semifinals	Finals/BM	Rank
Athlete	Event	Opposition Result	Opposition Result	Opposition Result	Opposition Result	Opposition Result	Rank
Sakura Alforte	Individual kata	—N/a	40.00; 3 Q	—N/a	40.70; 3 Q	Chien H.H. (TPE); W 41.90–41.30	3rd place, bronze medalist(s)
Junna Tsukii	Kumite -50 kg	Chonn (CAM); L 3–2	Did not advance				
Jamie Lim	Kumite -61 kg	Tursunalieva (UZB); W 3–1	Kanay (KAZ); L 0–1	Did not advance			
Arianne Brito	Kumite +68 kg	—N/a	Jung H.Y. (KOR); W 3–0	—N/a	Berultseva (KAZ); L 0–1	Aldrous (JOR); L 11-2	5

== Kurash ==
Men

Athlete	Event	Round of 16	Quarterfinal	Semifinal	Final	Rank
Athlete	Event	Opposition Result	Opposition Result	Opposition Result	Opposition Result	Rank
Ryan Christian Benavidez	66 kg	Kaewpinit (THA); W 5–0	Shturbabin (UZB); L 0–10	Did not advance		
Jackielou Escarpe	81 kg	Bye	Esanov (UZB); L 0–10	Did not advance		

Women

Athlete	Event	Round of 32	Round of 16	Quarterfinal	Semifinal	Final	Rank
Athlete	Event	Opposition Result	Opposition Result	Opposition Result	Opposition Result	Opposition Result	Rank
Helen Aclopen	52 kg	Bye	Shimada (JPN); L 3–3	Did not advance			
Charmea Quelino	52 kg	Tariyal (IND); W 8–3	Ortikboeva (UZB); L 0–10	Did not advance			

== Roller sports ==
=== Skateboard ===
==== Men's ====
Athlete	Event	Preliminary		Finals	
Athlete	Event	Result	Rank	Result	Rank
Kiko Francisco	Park	77.86	3 Q	83.58	4
Renzo Mark Feliciano	Street	52.73	7 Q	48.59	8
Motic Panugalinog	Street	39.36	10	Did not advance	

==== Women's ====
Athlete	Event	Qualification		Finals	
Athlete	Event	Result	Rank	Result	Rank
Mazel Paris Alegado	Park	56.96	7 Q	52.85	7
Margielyn Didal	Street	41.53	6 Q	23.39	8

== Rowing ==
=== Men's ===
Athlete	Event	Heats		Repechage		Semifinals		Final	
Athlete	Event	Time	Rank	Time	Rank	Time	Rank	Time	Rank
Cris Nievarez	Single sculls	7:20.51	3 SA/B	—N/a		7:25.65	4 FB	7:19.45	2 FB2
Edgar Ilas; Zuriel Sumintac	Lightweight double sculls	6:48.82	5 R	7:10.97	3 FB	Did not advance		6:51.81	5 FB5

=== Women's ===
Athlete	Event	Heats		Repechage		Semifinals		Final	
Athlete	Event	Time	Rank	Time	Rank	Time	Rank	Time	Rank
Joanie Delgaco	Single sculls	8:07.60	2 SA/B	—N/a		8:18.30	2 FA	8:05.93	5
Feiza Lenton; Tammy Sha	Lightweight double sculls	7:32.49	6 R	8:05.56	4 FB	Did not advance		7:45.37	5 FB5

== Rugby sevens ==
Team	Event	Group Stage			Classification round 9–13th					Rank
Team	Event	Opposition Score	Opposition Score	Rank	Opposition Score	Opposition Score	Opposition Score	Opposition Score	Rank	Rank
Philippines men's	Men's tournament	Malaysia; L 7–24	Hong Kong; L 5–43	3	Thailand; W 38–0	Nepal; W 55–0	Independent Athletes; L 12–21	Afghanistan; W 20–0 (w/o)	1	9

Team roster

The following is the squad for the 2022 Asian Games.

Head coach: (New Zealand) Darryl Suasua

No.	Pos.	Player	Age
1	FW	Tommy Kalaw Gilbert	27
2	BK	Kai Ledesma Stroem	25
3	FW	Donald Coleman	25
4	BK	Joe Palabay Dawson	33
5	BK	Luc Villalba Smith	22
7	BK	Jerome Rudder	25
8	BK	Vincent Amar Young	29
9	FW	Barberis Raphael	22
10	FW	Robert Luceno Fogerty	26
11	BK	Nicholas Gaffud Robertson	26
12	FW	Justin Coveney	38
14	FW	Rafael Julian Phillips	21

=== Preliminary round ===
Pos	Team	Pld	W	D	L	PF	PA	PD	Pts	Qualification
1	Hong Kong	2	2	0	0	83	12	+71	6	Quarterfinals
2	Malaysia	2	1	0	1	31	47	−16	4	Quarterfinals
3	Philippines	2	0	0	2	12	67	−55	2	Placing 9–13

Source: OCA

24 September
10:00

Philippines	7–24	Malaysia
Try: Robertson 4' c Con: Smith (1/1)		Try: Nordin 7+' c Mat Zizi 8' c Azizad (2) 12' m, 14' m Con: Mat Zizi (2/2); Nasarrudin (0/1); Anhar (0/1)

Cangqian Athletics Field, Hangzhou
Referee: Ibuki Tetsuka (Japan)

24 September
18:30

Hong Kong	43–5	Philippines
Try: Christie 4' c Herbert (3) 5' c, 7+' c, 8' m Lee 10' m Yiu 12' c Doherty 14+' m Con: Stiles (3/5); Webb (1/2)		Try: Rudder 1' m Con: Smith (0/1)

Cangqian Athletics Field, Hangzhou
Referee: Ibuki Tetsuka (Japan)

=== Ranking 9–13 ===
Pos	Team	Pld	W	D	L	PF	PA	PD	Pts
1	Philippines	4	3	0	1	125	21	+104	10 (Note: More than two teams are tied on match points, overall point difference was used as the tiebreaker.)
2	Independent Athletes	4	3	0	1	132	32	+100	10
3	Thailand	4	3	0	1	79	57	+22	10
4	Afghanistan	4	1	0	3	63	89	−26	6
5	Nepal	4	0	0	4	0	200	−200	4

Source: OCA
Notes:

25 September
10:00

Thailand	0–38	Philippines
		Try: Stroem 3' m Coleman 4' c Coveney 6' c Robertson 7+' m Gilbert 9' c Smith 14' c Con: Smith (2/4); Stroem (2/2)

Cangqian Athletics Field, Hangzhou
Referee: Leow Wei Liang (Singapore)

25 September
13:20

Philippines	55–0	Nepal
Try: Phillips 1' c Fogerty (2) 3' c, 6' m Stroem 5' m Barberis (2) 7+' m, 10' m Coleman 9' c Smith 11' c Rudder 14' c Con: Stroem (2/5); Smith (3/4)

Cangqian Athletics Field, Hangzhou
Referee: James Fairbourn (Great Britain)

25 September
17:15

Philippines	12–21	Independent Athletes
Try: Robertson 3' c Coleman 11' m Con: Smith (1/2)		Try: Gauder 1' c Fernando 5' c Jansen 8' c Con: Madusanka (1/1); Ratwatte (1/1); Jansen (1/1)

Cangqian Athletics Field, Hangzhou
Referee: Qu Shenggang (China)

26 September
16:00

Philippines	20–0; Awarded	Afghanistan

Cangqian Athletics Field, Hangzhou

== Sailing ==
Athlete	Event	Race																			Medal Race			Total	Net	Rank
Athlete	Event	1	2	3	4	5	6	7	8	9	10	11	12	13	14	15	16	17	18	19	1	2	3	Total	Net	Rank
Arrianne Angela Paz	Women's iQFoil	5	5	~~6~~; UFD	5	5	~~6~~; RET	5	5	5	5	5	2	4	~~6~~; DNF	5	5	6BFD	5	Cancelled				90	72	5

== Sepak takraw ==
Men

Athlete	Event	Group Stage					Semifinal	Final	
Athlete	Event	Opposition score	Opposition score	Opposition score	Opposition score	Rank	Opposition score	Opposition score	Rank
Ronsited Gabayeron; Mark Joseph Gonzales; Jason Huerte; Rheyjey Ortouste; Jom Lerry Rafael; Vince Alyson Torno	Quadrant	Japan (JPN); W 2–1	South Korea (KOR); W 2–1	India (IND); L 0–2	Singapore (SGP); W 2–0	2 Q	Indonesia (INA); L 1-2	Did not advance	3rd place, bronze medalist(s)
Ronsited Gabayeron; Mark Joseph Gonzales; Jason Huerte; Rheyjey Ortouste; Jom Lerry Rafael	Regu	Myanmar (MYA); W 2–0	India (IND); W 2–0	Thailand (THA); L 0–2	—N/a	2 Q	Malaysia (MAS); L 0–2	Did not advance	3rd place, bronze medalist(s)

Women

Athlete	Event	Group Stage				Semifinal	Final	
Athlete	Event	Opposition score	Opposition score	Opposition score	Rank	Opposition score	Opposition score	Rank
Allyssa Bandoy; Mary Ann Lopez; Rachelle Palomar; Abegail Sinogbuhan; Jean Marie Sucalit; Mary Melody Taming	Quadrant	Laos (LAO); L 0–2	China (CHN); L 1–2	India (IND); W 2–0	Did not advance			

== Shooting ==
Men

Athlete	Event	1st Qualification		2nd Qualification		Final/BM	
Athlete	Event	Score	Rank	Score	Rank	Score	Rank
Joaquin Ancheta	Skeet	58	38th	104	38th	Did not advance	
Eric Ang	Trap	62	37th	107	38th	Did not advance	
Carlos Carag	Trap	69	23rd	114	26th	Did not advance	
Enrique Leandro Enriquez	Skeet	62	37th	104	36th	Did not advance	
Paul Brian Rosario	Skeet	64	35th	104	37th	Did not advance	
Hagen Topacio	Trap	74	1st	117	18th	Did not advance	
Jayson Valdez	10m air rifle	617.4	42nd	—N/a		Did not advance	
Jayson Valdez	50m rifle 3 positions	555-16x	45th	—N/a		Did not advance	
Joaquin Ancheta; Enrique Leandro Enriquez; Paul Brian Rosario	Team skeet	184	9th	—N/a		307	9
Eric Ang; Carlos Carag; Hagen Topacio	Team trap	205	8th	—N/a		338	9

Women

Athlete	Event	1st Qualification		2nd Qualification		Final/BM	
Athlete	Event	Score	Rank	Score	Rank	Score	Rank
Amparo Acuña	10m air rifle	618	42nd	—N/a		Did not advance	
Amparo Acuña	50m rifle 3 positions	578-25x	23rd	—N/a		Did not advance	
Elvie Baldivino	10m air pistol	524-3x	56th	—N/a		Did not advance	
Elvie Baldivino	25m pistol	261-4x	43rd	511-7x	43rd	Did not advance	
Franchette Quiroz	10m air pistol	569 -14x	29th	—N/a		Did not advance	
Franchette Quiroz	25m pistol	287-6x	19th	563-10x	32nd	Did not advance	

Mixed

Athlete	Event	Qualification		Final/BM	
Athlete	Event	Score	Rank	Score	Rank
Amparo Acuña; Jayson Valdez	10m air rifle	613.5	19th	Did not advance	

== Softball ==
Team	Event	Group Stage				Super / Placement Round			Final / BM	
Team	Event	Opposition Score	Opposition Score	Opposition Score	Rank	Opposition Score	Opposition Score	Rank	Opposition Score	Rank
Philippines women's	Women's tournament	Thailand; W 11–0	China; L 0–7	South Korea; W 5–0	2 SR	Japan; L 2–9	Chinese Taipei; L 4–6	4 BM	Chinese Taipei; L 2–3	4

Team roster

Philippines roster – 2022 Asian Games
Players		Coaches
Pitchers: 7 Mary Ann Antolihao; 18 Royevel Palma; 75 Celyn Ojare; 88 Glory Alonzo	Catchers: 8 Francesca Altomonte; 71 Aliza Pichon; Infielders: 5 Skylynne Ellazar; 12 Charlotte Sales; 16 Reyae Mae Villamin; 46 Mary Joy Maguad; 55 Angelu Gabriel; Outfielders: 1 Danica Aquino; 20 Nicole Hammoude; 24 Alaiza Talisik; 27 Mae Langga; 41 Cristy Joy Roa; Designated hitters: 17 Elsie Dela Torre	Manager (Philippines) Anna Marie Santiago; Coaches (Philippines) Venerando Dizer (Philippines) Anthony Santos

=== Preliminary round ===
Pos	Team	Pld	W	L	RF	RA	PCT	GB	Qualification
1	China	3	3	0	24	0	1.000	—	Super round
2	Philippines	3	2	1	16	7	.667	1	Super round
3	South Korea	3	1	2	10	15	.333	2	Placement round
4	Thailand	3	0	3	1	29	.000	3	Placement round

Source: OCA

26 September; 9:00	Philippines	11–0 (F/4)	Thailand	Baseball & Softball Sports Center, Shaoxing; Attendance: 500; Umpires: Nong Junchuan (CHN)
26 September; 9:00	WP: Glory Alonzo	Boxscore	LP: Yanisa Suwannaree	Baseball & Softball Sports Center, Shaoxing; Attendance: 500; Umpires: Nong Junchuan (CHN)

27 September; 19:00	Philippines	0–7 (F/5)	China	Baseball & Softball Sports Center, Shaoxing; Attendance: 1,300; Umpires: Miki Yabe (JPN)
27 September; 19:00	LP: Glory Alonzo	Boxscore	WP: Chai Yinan	Baseball & Softball Sports Center, Shaoxing; Attendance: 1,300; Umpires: Miki Yabe (JPN)
27 September; 19:00		Boxscore	HR: Ren Min (1)	Baseball & Softball Sports Center, Shaoxing; Attendance: 1,300; Umpires: Miki Yabe (JPN)

28 September; 11:30	South Korea	0–5	Philippines	Baseball & Softball Sports Center, Shaoxing; Attendance: 500; Umpires: Xie Xin (CHN)
28 September; 11:30	LP: Park Min-kyoung	Boxscore	WP: Royevel Palma	Baseball & Softball Sports Center, Shaoxing; Attendance: 500; Umpires: Xie Xin (CHN)
28 September; 11:30		Boxscore	HR: Cristy Roa (1)	Baseball & Softball Sports Center, Shaoxing; Attendance: 500; Umpires: Xie Xin (CHN)

=== Super round ===
Pos	Team	Pld	W	L	RF	RA	PCT	GB	Qualification
1	Japan	3	3	0	15	5	1.000	—	Gold medal
2	China	3	2	1	8	1	.667	1	Gold medal
3	Chinese Taipei	3	1	2	9	10	.333	2	Bronze medal
4	Philippines	3	0	3	6	22	.000	3	Bronze medal

Source: OCA

29 September; 9:00	Philippines	2–9 (F/6)	Japan	Baseball & Softball Sports Center, Shaoxing; Attendance: 200; Umpires: Ge Lan (CHN)
29 September; 9:00	LP: Ann Antolihao	Boxscore	WP: Yukiko Ueno	Baseball & Softball Sports Center, Shaoxing; Attendance: 200; Umpires: Ge Lan (CHN)
29 September; 9:00		Boxscore	HR: Kanna Kudo (1), Yui Nakamizo (1), Ayane Nakagawa (1)	Baseball & Softball Sports Center, Shaoxing; Attendance: 200; Umpires: Ge Lan (CHN)

30 September; 15:30	Philippines	4–6	Chinese Taipei	Baseball & Softball Sports Center, Shaoxing; Attendance: 900; Umpires: Katsuhiro Tanaka (JPN)
30 September; 15:30	LP: Ann Antolihao	Boxscore	WP: Chiu An-ju; Sv: Ke Hsia-ai	Baseball & Softball Sports Center, Shaoxing; Attendance: 900; Umpires: Katsuhiro Tanaka (JPN)

=== Bronze Medal match ===
2 October; 15:00	Philippines	2–3	Chinese Taipei	Baseball & Softball Sports Center, Shaoxing; Attendance: 1,000; Umpires: Miki Yabe (JPN)
2 October; 15:00	LP: Royevel Palma	Boxscore	WP: Ke Hsia-ai; Sv: Chiu An-ju	Baseball & Softball Sports Center, Shaoxing; Attendance: 1,000; Umpires: Miki Yabe (JPN)
2 October; 15:00		Boxscore	HR: Lin Feng-chen (1)	Baseball & Softball Sports Center, Shaoxing; Attendance: 1,000; Umpires: Miki Yabe (JPN)

Team	1	2	3	4	5	6	7	R	H	E
Philippines	0	0	1	0	0	0	1	2	8	0
Chinese Taipei	0	0	1	0	2	0	X	3	5	1

== Soft tennis ==
=== Singles ===
Athlete	Event	Group stage			Round of 16	Quarterfinals	Semifinals	Final	
Athlete	Event	Opposition Score	Opposition Score	Rank	Opposition Score	Opposition Score	Opposition Score	Opposition Score	Rank
Adjuthor Moralde II	Men's	Nguyễn N.Q. (VIE); W 4–0	Patel (IND); W 4–0	1 Q	Bye	Chen Y.Hs (TPE); L 0-4	Did not advance		
Samuel Reane Nuguit	Men's	Ri R.H. (PRK); L 2–4	Uematsu (JPN); L 0–4	3	Did not advance				
Princess Lorben Marie Catindig	Women's	Nafiiah (INA); W 4–2	Mun H.G. (KOR); L 0–4	2	Did not advance				
Bambi Zoleta	Women's	Pitri (INA); L 3–4	Somsanit (THA); W 4–0	2	Did not advance				

=== Team ===
Athlete	Event	Group stage					Semifinals	Final	
Athlete	Event	Opposition Score	Opposition Score	Opposition Score	Opposition Score	Rank	Opposition Score	Opposition Score	Rank
Joseph Arcilla; Adjuthor Moralde II; Samuel Reane Nuguit; Sherwin Ray Nuguit; Dheo Talatayod	Men's	Japan (JPN); L 0–3	Indonesia (INA); L 0–3	Mongolia (MGL); W 3–0	—N/a	3	Did not advance		
Virvienica Isearis Bejosano; Princess Lorben Marie Catindig; Christy Sañosa; Bambi Zoleta; Bien Zoleta-Mañalac	Women's	South Korea (KOR); L 0–3	Chinese Taipei (TPE); L 0–3	Thailand (THA); W 3–0	Cambodia (CAM); W 3–0	3	Did not advance		
Dheo Talatayod; Bien Zoleta-Mañalac	Mixed Doubles	Meena; Tiwari (IND); W 5–3	Cheng Ch.L. Yu K.W. (TPE); L 1–5	Han S.R. Ri J.M. (PRK); L 4–5	—N/a	2	Did not advance		
Joseph Arcilla; Christy Sañosa	Mixed Doubles	Huang Sh.Y. Lin W.Ch. (TPE); L 3–5	Kim H.S. Mun H.G. (KOR); L 1–5	Patel; Kulandaivelu Manogarbabu (IND); L 3–5	—N/a	4	Did not advance		

== Sport climbing ==
=== Lead and bouldering ===
Athlete	Event	Bouldering Qualification			Lead Qualification			Qualification Total		Bouldering Semi-final			Lead Semi-final			Semi-final Total		Final		
Athlete	Event	Score	Points	Rank	Holds Reached	Points	Rank	Points	Rank	Score	Points	Rank	Holds Reached	Points	Rank	Points	Rank	Bouldering	Lead	Rank
Iman Mora	Men's	0T1hz4lz 0 6 17	23.5	19	19	16	19	39.5	19 Q	0T0hz2lz 0 0 10	9.2	20	14+	8.1	19	17.3	20	Did not advance		
John Joseph Veloria	Men's	0T1hz1lz 0 4 4	9.7	20	22+	22.1	17	31.8	20 Q	0T2hz3lz 0 4 6	19.5	14	14	8	20	27.5	17	Did not advance		
Milky Mae Mijares	Women's	1T2hz2lz 2 4 3	34.8	20	10+	6.1	18	40.9	20 Q	0T0hz5lz 0 0 5	6.13	19	10+	2.1	17	8.23	19	Did not advance		
Rochelle Suarez	Women's	2T2hz3lz 7 2 4	54.4	15	11+	7.1	11	61.5	15 Q	0T0hz3lz 0 0 3	6.40	17	10+	2.1	17	8.5	18	Did not advance		

== Squash ==
=== Singles ===
Athlete	Event	Round of 32	Round of 16	Quarterfinals	Semifinals	Final	
Athlete	Event	Opposition Score	Opposition Score	Opposition Score	Opposition Score	Opposition Score	Rank
Reymark Begornia	Men's	Hayashi (JPN); L 0–3	Did not advance				
Jonathan Reyes	Men's	Mangaonkar (IND); L 0–3	Did not advance				

=== Doubles ===
Athlete	Event	Group stage					Quarterfinals	Semifinals	Final	
Athlete	Event	Opposition Score	Opposition Score	Opposition Score	Opposition Score	Rank	Opposition Score	Opposition Score	Opposition Score	Rank
Jemyca Aribado; Robert Andrew Garcia	Mixed	Mukhtar; Veera (SRI); W 2–1	Li D. Zhou Zh. (CHN); W 2–1	Azman; Kamal (MAS); L 0–2	—N/a	2 Q	Karthik; Sandhu (IND); L 1–2	Did not advance		
Yvonne Dalida; David Pelino	Mixed	Ab Singh; An Singh (IND); L 0–2	Arkarahirunya; Prasertratanakul (THA); W 2–0	Tang M.H. Tong T.W. (HKG); L 0–2	Gul; Zaman (PAK); W 2–0	3	Did not advance			

=== Team ===
Athlete	Event	Group stage						Semifinals	Final	
Athlete	Event	Opposition Score	Opposition Score	Opposition Score	Opposition Score	Opposition Score	Rank	Opposition Score	Opposition Score	Rank
Reymark Begornia; Robert Andrew Garcia; David Pelino; Jonathan Reyes	Men's	Malaysia (MAS); L 0–3	Japan (JPN); L 0–3	Hong Kong (HKG); L 0–3	South Korea (KOR); L 1–2	Thailand (THA); W 3–0	5	Did not advance		

== Swimming ==
=== Men's ===
Athlete	Event	Heats		Final	
Athlete	Event	Time	Rank	Time	Rank
Jarod Hatch	50m butterfly	24.31	13	Did not advance	
Jarod Hatch	50m freestyle	23.77	21	Did not advance	
Jarod Hatch	100m butterfly	53.70	12	Did not advance	
Jarod Hatch	100m freestyle	50.90	14	Did not advance	
Jerard Jacinto	50m backstroke	26.14	12	Did not advance	
Jerard Jacinto	100m backstroke	57.57	15	Did not advance	

=== Women's ===
Athlete	Event	Heats		Final	
Athlete	Event	Time	Rank	Time	Rank
Jasmine Alkhaldi	50m freestyle	26.20	13	Did not advance	
Jasmine Alkhaldi	50m butterfly	27.72	13	Did not advance	
Jasmine Alkhaldi	100m butterfly	1:01.96	13	Did not advance	
Jasmine Alkhaldi	100m freestyle	57.47	13	Did not advance	
Xiandi Chua	200m backstroke	2:15.44	8 Q	2:13.63	7
Xiandi Chua	200m individual medley	2:16.43	8 Q	2:16.18 NR	8
Xiandi Chua	400m individual medley	4:55.83	7 Q	4:50.50	7
Thanya dela Cruz	50m breaststroke	32.06	13	Did not advance	
Thanya dela Cruz	100m breaststroke	1:12.04	15	Did not advance	
Chloe Isleta	200m backstroke	2:20.28	11	Did not advance	
Chloe Isleta	200m individual medley	2:20.54	13	Did not advance	
Teia Salvino	50m backstroke	29.08	8 Q	28.79	8
Teia Salvino	100m backstroke	1:02.09	10 R	Did not advance	
Teia Salvino	200m freestyle	2:04.51	11	Did not advance	
Kayla Sanchez	50m backstroke	28.86	6 Q	28.66 NR	6
Kayla Sanchez	50m freestyle	25.79	12	Did not advance	
Kayla Sanchez	100m backstroke	1:01.94	9 R	Did not advance	
Kayla Sanchez	100m freestyle	54.70	3 Q	54.69 NR	5
Jasmine Alkhaldi; Xiandi Chua; Chloe Isleta; Teia Salvino; Kayla Sanchez	4x100m freestyle relay	3:48.06	5 Q	3:44.31 NR	5
Jasmine Alkhaldi; Thanya dela Cruz; Teia Salvino; Kayla Sanchez	4x100m medley relay	4:10.80	5 Q	4:10.61 NR	4
Jasmine Alkhaldi; Xiandi Chua; Chloe Isleta; Teia Salvino; Kayla Sanchez	4x200m freestyle relay	8:30.42	6 Q	8:12.80 NR	5

== Taekwondo ==
=== Poomsae ===
Athlete	Event	Round of 16	Quarterfinal	Semifinal	Final	
Athlete	Event	Opposition score	Opposition score	Opposition score	Opposition score	Rank
Patrick King Perez	Men's individual	Chanthilath (LAO); W 7.700–7.440	Limbu (NEP); W 7.560–7.160	Ma Y.Zh. (TPE); L 6.910–7.450	Did not advance	3rd place, bronze medalist(s)
Jocel Lyn Ninobla	Women's individual	Cha Y.E. (KOR); L 7.560–7.680	Did not advance			

=== Kyorugi ===
Athlete	Event	Round of 32	Round of 16	Quarterfinal	Semifinal	Final	
Athlete	Event	Opposition score	Opposition score	Opposition score	Opposition score	Opposition score	Rank
Kurt Bryan Barbosa	Men's –58 kg	Otajonov (UZB); L 0–2	Did not advance				
Joseph Chua	Men's –63 kg	Bye	Gazez (KAZ); L RSC	Did not advance			
Arven Alcantara	Men's –68 kg	Bye	Cho (THA); W 2–0	Abdul Kareem (JOR); L 0–2	Did not advance		
Dave Cea	Men's –80 kg	Alsowaiq (KSA); W 2–0	Barkhordari (IRI); L 0–2	Did not advance			
Samuel Morrison	Men's +80 kg	—N/a	Salimi (IRI); L 0–2	Did not advance			
Veronica Garces	Women's –49 kg	Mirshakarzoda (TJK); W 2–0	Nematzadeh (IRI); L 0–2	Did not advance			
Jessica Canabal	Women's –53 kg	Bye	Katoh (JPN); W 2–1	Kayumova (UZB); L 1–2	Did not advance		
Jubilee Briones	Women's –57 kg	—N/a	Harnsujin (THA); L 1–2	Did not advance			
Laila Delo	Women's –67 kg	—N/a	Bạc T.K. (VIE); L 0–2	Did not advance			
Kirstie Alora	Women's +67 kg	Bye	Tavakoli (IRI); L 0–2	Did not advance			
Arven Alcantara; Jessica Canabal; Dave Cea; Laila Delo	Mixed team	—N/a		Vietnam (VIE); L 26–35	Did not advance		

== Tennis ==
Three tennis players have been announced to represent the Philippines.

Athlete	Event	Round of 64	Round of 32	Round of 16	Quarterfinals	Semifinals	Final	
Athlete	Event	Opposition Result	Opposition Result	Opposition Result	Opposition Result	Opposition Result	Opposition Result	Rank
Francis Alcantara; Ruben Gonzales Jr.	Men's doubles	Suksumrarn; Trongcharoenchaikul (THA); L 1–2	Did not advance					
Alexandra Eala	Women's singles	Bye	Khan (PAK); W 2–0	Bhosale (IND); W 2–0	Okamura (JPN); W 2–1	Zheng Q. (CHN); L 1–2	Did not advance	3rd place, bronze medalist(s)
Francis Alcantara; Alexandra Eala	Mixed doubles	Bye	Khanal; Thapa (NEP); W 2–0	Bhambri; Raina (IND); W 2–1	Jones; Kumkhum (THA); W 2–0	Huang T.S. Liang E.S. (TPE); L 0–2	Did not advance	3rd place, bronze medalist(s)

== Triathlon ==
Men's

Athlete	Event	Swim (1.5 km)		Trans 1			Bike (40 km)			Trans 2			Run (10 km)		Total	Rank
Athlete	Event	Time	Swim Rank	Time	Transfer Rank	Overall Rank	Time	Bike Rank	Overall Rank	Time	Transfer Rank	Overall Rank	Time	Run Rank	Total	Rank
Fer Casares	Individual	21:20	20	0:34	=7	18	1:00:33	16	15	0:24	=6	13	38:02	9	2:00:53	10
Kim Remolino	Individual	21:20	19	0:35	12	19	1:00:31	15	13	0:30	15	15	41:51	13	2:04:47	13

Women's

Athlete	Event	Swim (1.5 km)		Trans 1			Bike (40 km)			Trans 2			Run (10 km)		Total	Rank
Athlete	Event	Time	Swim Rank	Time	Transfer Rank	Overall Rank	Time	Bike Rank	Overall Rank	Time	Transfer Rank	Overall Rank	Time	Run Rank	Total	Rank
Raven Alcoseba	Individual	20:49	10	0:40	=13	12	1:07:10	15	15	0:29	=10	14	54:57	17	2:24:05	16
Kim Mangrobang	Individual	21:47	11	0:39	=9	11	1:06:11	=13	12	0:26	=7	11	44:46	13	2:13:49	13

Mixed

Athlete	Event	Swim (300 m)		Trans 1		Bike (6.7 km)		Trans 2		Run (1.86 km)		Leg Time	Leg Rank	Total	Rank
Athlete	Event	Time	Swim Rank	Time	Transfer Rank	Time	Bike Rank	Time	Transfer Rank	Time	Run Rank	Leg Time	Leg Rank	Total	Rank
Matthew Hermosa	Relay	3:53	8	0:58	=3	10:16	9	0:34	=11	6:31	8	22:12	8	1:33:59	7
Raven Alcoseba	Relay	4:34	8	1:04	=5	11:13	=6	0:27	=7	7:19	7	24:37	7	1:33:59	7
Fer Casares	Relay	4:27	9	1:01	6	10:23	7	0:25	=4	5:53	4	22:09	8	1:33:59	7
Kim Mangrobang	Relay	4:51	7	1:06	=2	11:33	9	0:29	=7	7:02	=4	25:01	8	1:33:59	7

== Volleyball ==
The Philippines is set to participate in all but one event in volleyball. The Philippine National Volleyball Federation was unable to secure commitment from enough players in the Premier Volleyball League and collegiate teams to be able to send a team for the women's indoor volleyball tournament. The NU Lady Bulldogs were supposed to form the core of the women's national team.

=== Beach volleyball ===
Athlete	Event	Preliminary		Round of 16	Quarterfinals	Semifinals	Final / BM	
Athlete	Event	Oppositions Scores	Rank	Opposition Score	Opposition Score	Opposition Score	Opposition Score	Rank
Alnakran Abdilla; Jaron Requinton	Men's tournament	Efendi–Pribadi (INA): L 1–2; Tijan–Younousse (QAT): L 0–2	3	Did not advance				17
James Buytrago; Jude Garcia	Men's tournament	Abuduhalikejiang–Wu J. (CHN): L 1–2; Ismail–Naseem (MDV): W 2–0	2 Q	Akbar–Ashfiya (INA); L 1–2	Did not advance			9
Genesa Eslapor; Floremel Rodriguez	Women's tournament	Kim S.Y.–Shin J.U. (KOR): W 2–0; Xia X.–Xue C. (CHN): L 0–2; Ivanchenko–Kabulbekova (KAZ): W 2–0; Chathurika–Deepika (SRI): W 2–0	2 Q	Law W.S.–Leong O.I. (MAC); W 2–0	Ishii–Mizoe (JPN); L 0–2	Did not advance		5
Grydelle Matibag; Khylem Progella	Women's tournament	To W.T.–Wong M.C. (HKG): W 2–1; Juliana–Ratnasari (INA): L 0–2; Lei K.L.–Tam K.T. (MAC): W 2–0; Kongphopsarutawadee–Naraphornrapat (THA): L 0–2	3 Q	Patcharamainaruebhorn–Phirachayankrailert (THA); L 0–2	Did not advance			9

=== Indoor volleyball ===
Summary

Team	Event	Group stage				Quarterfinals	Semifinals	Final / BM
Team	Event	Opposition Score	Opposition Score	Opposition Score	Rank	Opposition Score	Opposition Score	Opposition Score
Philippine men's	Men's tournament	Indonesia; L 0–3	Afghanistan; W 3–0	Japan; L 0–3	3	Did not advance		

==== Men's tournament ====
The Philippines conceded its opening game to Indonesia. However they were able to clinch a win against Afghanistan – their first since their 1974 Asian Games stint. In that tournament, their lone win came from the game against Pakistan. They failed to advance to the next round after losing their final group match against Japan.

Team roster

Philippine Men's National Volleyball Team for the 2022 Asian Games
Position	Name	Date of birth	Height	Current team
OH	Bryan Bagunas	October 10, 1997 (aged 25)	1.95 m (6 ft 5 in)	(Chinese Taipei) Win Streak
OH	Marck Espejo	March 1, 1997 (aged 26)	1.91 m (6 ft 3 in)	(South Korea) Incheon Korean Air Jumbos
OH	Ryan Andrew Ka	November 22, 2000 (aged 22)	1.90 m (6 ft 3 in)	(United States) UC San Diego Tritons
OH	Joshua Umandal	March 8, 1998 (aged 25)	1.88 m (6 ft 2 in)	(Philippines) AMC Cotabato Spikers
MB	John Paul Bugaoan	January 8, 1999 (aged 24)	1.91 m (6 ft 3 in)	(Philippines) Cignal HD Spikers
MB	Lloyd Josafat	September 18, 1999 (aged 24)	1.93 m (6 ft 4 in)	(Philippines) Cignal HD Spikers
MB	Kim Malabunga	May 8, 1996 (aged 27)	1.95 m (6 ft 5 in)	(Philippines) Imus City–AJAA Spikers
MB	Chu Njigha	December 5, 1998 (aged 24)	1.95 m (6 ft 5 in)	(Philippines) Cignal HD Spikers
OP	Steve Rotter	April 16, 1998 (aged 25)	1.98 m (6 ft 6 in)	(Philippines) AMC Cotabato Spikers
S	Vince Mangulabnan	June 3, 1994 (aged 29)	1.73 m (5 ft 8 in)	(Philippines) AMC Cotabato Spikers
S	Adrian Villados	December 9, 1999 (aged 23)	1.82 m (6 ft 0 in)	(Philippines) Arellano Chiefs
L	Manuel Sumanguid III	January 25, 1998 (aged 25)	1.70 m (5 ft 7 in)	(Philippines) Cignal HD Spikers

Group play

Pos	Team	Pld	W	L	Pts	SW	SL	SR	SPW	SPL	SPR	Qualification
1	Japan	3	3	0	9	9	0	MAX	226	166	1.361	Final round
2	Indonesia	3	2	1	6	6	3	2.000	206	196	1.051	Final round
3	Philippines	3	1	2	3	3	6	0.500	196	201	0.975	
4	Afghanistan	3	0	3	0	0	9	0.000	161	226	0.712	

Source: AVC

Date	Time		Score		Set 1	Set 2	Set 3	Set 4	Set 5	Total	Report
19 Sep	19:00	Indonesia	3–0	Philippines	25–22	25–23	25–20			75–65	Report
20 Sep	14:30	Afghanistan	0–3	Philippines	23–25	16–25	12–25			51–75	Report
21 Sep	19:00	Philippines	0–3	Japan	19–25	14–25	23–25			56–75	Report

== Weightlifting ==
The Samahang Weightlifting ng Pilipinas announced that 5 athletes (4 women and 1 man) will represent the country in the sport.

=== Men ===
Athlete	Event	Snatch					Clean & Jerk					Total	Rank
Athlete	Event	1	2	3	Result	Rank	1	2	3	Result	Rank	Total	Rank
John Ceniza	61 kg	128	131	134 NR	134	3	~~163~~	163	~~167~~	163	5	297	4

=== Women ===
Athlete	Event	Snatch					Clean & Jerk					Total	Rank
Athlete	Event	1	2	3	Result	Rank	1	2	3	Result	Rank	Total	Rank
Rosegie Ramos	49 kg	83	85	87 NR	87	4	100	~~103~~	103	103	5	190 NR	5
Hidilyn Diaz	59 kg	94	97	~~100~~	97	4	121	126	~~131~~	126	4	223	4
Elreen Ando	64 kg	93	~~95~~	96	96	3	117	122	126 NR	126	3	222	3rd place, bronze medalist(s)
Vanessa Sarno	76 kg	100	105 NR	~~108~~	105	5	130	~~136~~	~~136~~	130	5	235 NR	5

== Wrestling ==
Athlete	Event	Round of 16	Quarterfinals	Semifinals	Repechage	Final/BM	Rank
Athlete	Event	Opposition Result	Opposition Result	Opposition Result	Opposition Result	Opposition Result	Rank
Alvin Lobreguito	Men's freestyle –57 kg	Khari (IRI); L 0–10	Did not advance				
Ronil Tubog	Men's freestyle –65 kg	Punia (IND); L 0–10	Did not advance				
Jiah Pingot	Women's freestyle –50 kg	Chen Y.J. (TPE); L 0–2	Did not advance				

== Wushu ==
=== Men's ===
Changquan

Athlete	Event	Total	
Athlete	Event	Result	Rank
Sandrex Gaisan	Changquan	8.763	14

Daoshu\Gunshu

Athlete	Event	Daoshu		Gunshu		Total	
Athlete	Event	Result	Rank	Result	Rank	Result	Rank
Johnzeth Gajo	Daoshu\Gunshu All-Round	9.680	6	9.403	9	19.083	7

Nanquan\Nangun

Athlete	Event	Nanquan		Nangun		Total	
Athlete	Event	Result	Rank	Result	Rank	Result	Rank
Thornton Sayan	Nanquan\Nangun All-Round	8.913	18	9.670	12	18.583	16

Sanda

Athlete	Event	Round of 16	Quarterfinals	Semifinals	Final	
Athlete	Event	Opposition Result	Opposition Result	Opposition Result	Opposition Result	Rank
Arnel Mandal	-56 kg	Mayanglambam (IND); W WPD	Guliboev (UZB); W 2–0	Amanbekov (KGZ); W 2–0	Jiang H. (CHN); L WPD	2nd place, silver medalist(s)
Gideon Fred Padua	-60 kg	Pengthai (THA); W 2–0	Yazymov (TKM); W 2–0	Panahigelehkolaei (IRI); L WIS	Did not advance	3rd place, bronze medalist(s)
Clemente Tabugara Jr.	-65 kg	Handurdyyev (TKM); W 2–1	Ashirov (KAZ); W 2–0	Marbun (INA); L 0–2	Did not advance	3rd place, bronze medalist(s)

Taijiquan\Taijijian

Athlete	Event	Taijiquan		Taijijian		Total	
Athlete	Event	Result	Rank	Result	Rank	Result	Rank
Jones Inso	Taijiquan\Taijijian All-Round	9.746	2	9.740	4	19.486	3rd place, bronze medalist(s)

=== Women's ===
Taijiquan\Taijijian

Athlete	Event	Taijiquan		Taijijian		Total	
Athlete	Event	Result	Rank	Result	Rank	Result	Rank
Agatha Wong	Taijiquan\Taijijian All-Round	9.720	7	9.736	3	19.456	5

== See also ==
- Philippines at the 2021 Southeast Asian Games
- Philippines at the 2023 Southeast Asian Games
- Philippines at the 2020 Summer Olympics
- Philippines at the 2020 Summer Paralympics
