= Ju-jitsu at the 2022 Asian Games – Women's 57 kg =

Women's jiu-jitsu 57 kg at the 2022 Asian Games
- Venue: Xiaoshan Linpu Gymnasium
- Dates: 6 October 2023
- Competitors: 19 from 12 nations

Medalists
gold medal	Annie Ramirez	Philippines
silver medal	Galina Duvanova	Kazakhstan
bronze medal	Shamsa Al-Ameri	United Arab Emirates
bronze medal	Orapa Senatham	Thailand

The women's jiu-jitsu (ne-waza) 57 kilograms Ju-jitsu competition at the 2022 Asian Games in Hangzhou was held on 6 October 2023 at Xiaoshan Linpu Gymnasium.

== Schedule ==
All times are China Standard Time (UTC+08:00)

Date	Time	Event
Friday, 6 October 2023	09:00	Elimination round of 32
Friday, 6 October 2023	09:00	Elimination round of 16
Friday, 6 October 2023	09:00	Quarterfinals
Friday, 6 October 2023	09:00	Semifinals
Friday, 6 October 2023	09:00	Repechage round 1
Friday, 6 October 2023	15:00	Finals

== Results ==
Legend

- SU — Won by submission (50–0)

=== Main bracket ===
==== Final ====
Final
Galina Duvanova (KAZ)	0
Annie Ramirez (PHI)	2

==== Top half ====
Elimination round of 32
Oon Zi Gui (SGP)	0
Nguyễn Thị Minh Vương (VIE)	5

Elimination round of 16
Galina Duvanova (KAZ)	0^{SU}
Nguyễn Thị Minh Vương (VIE)	0
Tsogkhüügiin Udval (MGL)	9^{SU}
Nikita Choudhary (IND)	0
Haya Al-Jhoori (UAE)	0
Yasmine Alami (JOR)	2
Cassandra Poyong (MAS)	0
Orapa Senatham (THA)	0^{SU}

Quarterfinals
Galina Duvanova (KAZ)	0
Tsogkhüügiin Udval (MGL)	0
Yasmine Alami (JOR)	0
Orapa Senatham (THA)	0

Semifinals
Galina Duvanova (KAZ)	2
Orapa Senatham (THA)	0

==== Bottom half ====
Elimination round of 32
Geum Ga-eun (KOR)	13^{SU}
Angitha Shyju (IND)	0
Lê Thị Thương (VIE)	5
Aidana Sabitova (KAZ)	0

Elimination round of 16
Shamsa Al-Ameri (UAE)	2
Geum Ga-eun (KOR)	2
Rattanaporn Thatthong (THA)	5
Lama Al-Madani (KSA)	2
Fiona Toh (SGP)	3
Enkhmönkhiin Shürentsetseg (MGL)	0
Lê Thị Thương (VIE)	0
Annie Ramirez (PHI)	0

Quarterfinals
Shamsa Al-Ameri (UAE)	10
Rattanaporn Thatthong (THA)	0
Fiona Toh (SGP)	0
Annie Ramirez (PHI)	7

Semifinals
Shamsa Al-Ameri (UAE)	0
Annie Ramirez (PHI)	0^{SU}

=== Repechage ===
Repechage round 1
Tsogkhüügiin Udval (MGL)	0
Yasmine Alami (JOR)	0
Rattanaporn Thatthong (THA)	20
Fiona Toh (SGP)	2

Contests for bronze medals
Yasmine Alami (JOR)	0
Shamsa Al-Ameri (UAE)	0^{SU}
Rattanaporn Thatthong (THA)	0
Orapa Senatham (THA)	12
