= Wushu at the 2022 Asian Games – Men's sanda 56 kg =

Men's sanda 56 kg at the 2022 Asian Games
- Venue: Xiaoshan Guali Sports Centre
- Dates: 24–28 September 2023
- Competitors: 15 from 15 nations

Medalists
gold medal	Jiang Haidong	China
silver medal	Arnel Mandal	Philippines
bronze medal	Avazbek Amanbekov	Kyrgyzstan
bronze medal	Hứa Văn Đoàn	Vietnam

The men's sanda 56 kilograms competition at the 2022 Asian Games in Hangzhou, China was held from 24 to 28 September 2023 at the Xiaoshan Guali Sports Centre.

A total of fifteen competitors from fifteen countries (NOCs) competed in this event, limited to fighters whose body weight was less than 56 kilograms.

Competition bouts consist of 3 rounds in total, each lasting two minutes with a one-minute rest period between rounds. The athlete who scores more points in each round is the winner of that rounds; the bout ends when one athlete has won two rounds (and thus the match).

Jiang Haidong from China won the gold medal.

== Schedule ==
All times are China Standard Time (UTC+08:00)

Date	Time	Event
Sunday, 24 September 2023	19:30	1/8 finals
Tuesday, 26 September 2023	19:30	Quarterfinals
Wednesday, 27 September 2023	19:30	Semifinals
Thursday, 28 September 2023	09:30	Final

== Results ==
Legend

- PD — Won by point difference

1/8 finals
M. Sunil Singh (IND)
Arnel Mandal (PHI)	PD
Avazbek Amanbekov (KGZ)	2
Rohit Chunaro (NEP)	0
Ku Hio Lam (MAC)	0
Thongchai Huanak (THA)	2
Hong Min-jun (KOR)	2
Tharwat Al-Sendi (YEM)	0
Hak Phommachanh (LAO)
Hứa Văn Đoàn (VIE)	PD
Mohammad Karim Faqiri (AFG)	0
Bintang Reindra (INA)	2
Jiang Haidong (CHN)	2
Karim Iminzhanov (KAZ)	0

Quarterfinals
Jamshidbek Guliboev (UZB)	0
Arnel Mandal (PHI)	2
Avazbek Amanbekov (KGZ)	2
Thongchai Huanak (THA)	0
Hong Min-jun (KOR)	0
Hứa Văn Đoàn (VIE)	2
Bintang Reindra (INA)	0
Jiang Haidong (CHN)	2

Semifinals
Arnel Mandal (PHI)	2
Avazbek Amanbekov (KGZ)	0
Hứa Văn Đoàn (VIE)	0
Jiang Haidong (CHN)	2

Final
Arnel Mandal (PHI)
Jiang Haidong (CHN)	PD
