= Kaila Napolis =

Filipino jujutsu practitioner

- Born: August 24, 1996 (age 30)
- Nationality: Filipino

Jenna Kaila Napolis (born August 24, 1996) is a Filipino jujutsu practitioner who is a silver medalist at the 2025 World Games.

== Early life and education ==
Napolis was born on August 26, 1996. She graduated at the College of Saint Benilde with a degree in culinary arts.

== Career ==
Kaila Napolis has been a jujutsu practitioner since about 2013.

She participated at the 2017 Asian Indoor and Martial Arts Games where she was defeated by compatriot Annie Ramirez in the final of the ne-waza 55 kg division. In the 2018 Asian Games, she lost the bronze medal game to fellow Filipino, Meggie Ochoa.

Napolis lost to Jessa Khan of Cambodia in the final of the 49 kg division of the ju-jitsu event of the 2019 SEA Games in the Philippines, settling for silver. Since then, Napolis began adjusting her technique.

The 2021 Ju-Jitsu World Championships saw Napolis win a bronze in the 52 kg event.

At the 2023 SEA Games in Cambodia, Napolis won a gold medal at the expense of Khan in the ne-waza 52 kg division.

Napolis won a gold at the 2023 World Combat Games in Riyadh in the 52 kg.

At the 2025 World Games, Napolis won a silver medal in the ne-waza 52 kg losing to Im Eon-ju of South Korea due to her opponent's advantage after a 2-2 draw.
