= Ju-jitsu at the 2022 Asian Games – Men's 77 kg =

Men's jiu-jitsu 77 kg at the 2022 Asian Games
- Venue: Xiaoshan Linpu Gymnasium
- Dates: 6 October 2023
- Competitors: 27 from 18 nations

Medalists
gold medal	Koo Bon-cheol	South Korea
silver medal	Ali Munfaredi	Bahrain
bronze medal	Mahdi Al-Awlaqi	United Arab Emirates
bronze medal	Mönkhtöriin Davaadorj	Mongolia

The men's jiu-jitsu (ne-waza) 77 kilograms Ju-jitsu competition at the 2022 Asian Games in Hangzhou was held on 6 October 2023 at Xiaoshan Linpu Gymnasium.

== Schedule ==
All times are China Standard Time (UTC+08:00)

Date	Time	Event
Friday, 6 October 2023	09:00	Elimination round of 32
Friday, 6 October 2023	09:00	Elimination round of 16
Friday, 6 October 2023	09:00	Quarterfinals
Friday, 6 October 2023	09:00	Semifinals
Friday, 6 October 2023	09:00	Repechage round 1
Friday, 6 October 2023	15:00	Finals

== Results ==
Legend

- SU — Won by submission (50–0)

=== Main bracket ===
==== Final ====
Final
Ali Munfaredi (BRN)	0
Koo Bon-cheol (KOR)	0

==== Top half ====
Elimination round of 32
Umid Saydullaev (UZB)	2
Fahad Al-Marri (KUW)	2
Bahromjon Abdurahmoni (TJK)	5
Ali Ahmed (IRQ)	0
Banpot Lertthaisong (THA)	0
Olzhas Nurtakanov (KAZ)	2
Paul Lim (SGP)	2
Qais Maraaba (PLE)	0
Gerard Gallos (PHI)	0
Batsükhiin Batbayar (MGL)	10

Elimination round of 16
Ali Munfaredi (BRN)	2^{SU}
Fahad Al-Marri (KUW)	0
Bahromjon Abdurahmoni (TJK)	4
Olzhas Nurtakanov (KAZ)	5
Torokan Bagynbai Uulu (KGZ)	2
Paul Lim (SGP)	2
Batsükhiin Batbayar (MGL)	2
Faraj Al-Awlaqi (UAE)	2

Quarterfinals
Ali Munfaredi (BRN)	3
Olzhas Nurtakanov (KAZ)	0
Paul Lim (SGP)	2
Faraj Al-Awlaqi (UAE)	2

Semifinals
Ali Munfaredi (BRN)	6
Paul Lim (SGP)	0

==== Bottom half ====
Elimination round of 32
Adlan Madayev (KAZ)	4
Mahmoud Jabr (JOR)	6
Kampanart Polput (THA)	4
Jelilmuhammet Hojamyradow (TKM)	0^{SU}
Mönkhtöriin Davaadorj (MGL)	2
Naser Abdulkareem (KUW)	0
Mehroj Kamolov (TJK)	2
Abdullah Al-Ghannam (KSA)	2
Mahmood Al-Najjar (BRN)	2
Feruzbek Urokov (UZB)	7
Azambek Shamshiev (KGZ)	13^{SU}
Ahmed Al-Jehani (QAT)	0

Elimination round of 16
Koo Bon-cheol (KOR)	0
Mahmoud Jabr (JOR)	0
Jelilmuhammet Hojamyradow (TKM)	0
Mönkhtöriin Davaadorj (MGL)	2
Abdullah Al-Ghannam (KSA)	0
Feruzbek Urokov (UZB)	2
Azambek Shamshiev (KGZ)	0
Mahdi Al-Awlaqi (UAE)	2

Quarterfinals
Koo Bon-cheol (KOR)	2
Mönkhtöriin Davaadorj (MGL)	0
Feruzbek Urokov (UZB)	0
Mahdi Al-Awlaqi (UAE)	0^{SU}

Semifinals
Koo Bon-cheol (KOR)	0
Mahdi Al-Awlaqi (UAE)	0

=== Repechage ===
Repechage round 1
Olzhas Nurtakanov (KAZ)	0
Faraj Al-Awlaqi (UAE)	2
Mönkhtöriin Davaadorj (MGL)	0
Feruzbek Urokov (UZB)	0

Contests for bronze medals
Faraj Al-Awlaqi (UAE)	0
Mahdi Al-Awlaqi (UAE)	0^{SU}
Mönkhtöriin Davaadorj (MGL)	2^{SU}
Paul Lim (SGP)	0
