= Ju-jitsu at the 2022 Asian Games – Men's 62 kg =

Men's jiu-jitsu 62 kg at the 2022 Asian Games
- Venue: Xiaoshan Linpu Gymnasium
- Dates: 5 October 2023
- Competitors: 31 from 20 nations

Medalists
gold medal	Khaled Al-Shehi	United Arab Emirates
silver medal	Khalid Al-Blooshi	United Arab Emirates
bronze medal	Abdulmalik Al-Murdhi	Saudi Arabia
bronze medal	Mansur Khabibulla	Kazakhstan

The men's jiu-jitsu (ne-waza) 62 kilograms Ju-jitsu competition at the 2022 Asian Games in Hangzhou was held on 5 October 2023 at Xiaoshan Linpu Gymnasium.

== Schedule ==
All times are China Standard Time (UTC+08:00)

Date	Time	Event
Thursday, 5 October 2023	09:00	Elimination round of 32
Thursday, 5 October 2023	09:00	Elimination round of 16
Thursday, 5 October 2023	09:00	Quarterfinals
Thursday, 5 October 2023	09:00	Semifinals
Thursday, 5 October 2023	09:00	Repechage round 1
Thursday, 5 October 2023	15:00	Finals

== Results ==
Legend

- SU — Won by submission (50–0)

=== Main bracket ===
==== Final ====
Final
Khaled Al-Shehi (UAE)	0^{SU}
Khalid Al-Blooshi (UAE)	0

==== Top half ====
Elimination round of 32
Ölziitogtokhyn Erdenebaatar (MGL)	2
Myron Myles Mangubat (PHI)	2
Kamal Singh (IND)	0
Şyhberdi Rahmanow (TKM)	2
Khalil Arnaout (JOR)	2^{SU}
Ali Al-Jalahma (QAT)	0
Mansur Khabibulla (KAZ)	3^{SU}
Osamah Al-Marwai (KSA)	0
Khushdil Jafarov (TJK)	0
Nursultan Kushtarbek Uulu (KGZ)	2
Timothy Slayman (LAO)	0
Seo Seok-hyeon (KOR)	28
Sirojbek Rustamov (UZB)	0
Suwijak Kuntong (THA)	0^{SU}

Elimination round of 16
Khaled Al-Shehi (UAE)	0^{SU}
Ölziitogtokhyn Erdenebaatar (MGL)	0
Şyhberdi Rahmanow (TKM)	0
Khalil Arnaout (JOR)	2
Mansur Khabibulla (KAZ)	10^{SU}
Nursultan Kushtarbek Uulu (KGZ)	0
Seo Seok-hyeon (KOR)	0
Suwijak Kuntong (THA)	0

Quarterfinals
Khaled Al-Shehi (UAE)	0^{SU}
Khalil Arnaout (JOR)	0
Mansur Khabibulla (KAZ)	0^{SU}
Seo Seok-hyeon (KOR)	0

Semifinals
Khaled Al-Shehi (UAE)	0
Mansur Khabibulla (KAZ)	0

==== Bottom half ====
Elimination round of 32
Darkhan Nortayev (KAZ)	2
Han Hyeon-woo (KOR)	0
Abdallah Jaweesh (JOR)	2
Nursultan Arzymatov (KGZ)	0
Khalid Al-Blooshi (UAE)	10
Enayatullah Karimi (AFG)	0
Tarun Yadav (IND)	0
Cần Văn Thắng (VIE)	7
Amirul Syafiq (SGP)	2
Marc Lim (PHI)	3
Sarvarbek Rakhmonberdiev (UZB)	2
Mohammed Ajaj (PLE)	2
Komkrit Keadnin (THA)	0
Mehran Sattar (IRI)	3
Batsuuriin Bayartulga (MGL)	0
Abdulmalik Al-Murdhi (KSA)	6

Elimination round of 16
Darkhan Nortayev (KAZ)	0
Abdallah Jaweesh (JOR)	0
Khalid Al-Blooshi (UAE)	10
Cần Văn Thắng (VIE)	0
Marc Lim (PHI)	2
Mohammed Ajaj (PLE)	0
Mehran Sattar (IRI)	0
Abdulmalik Al-Murdhi (KSA)	2

Quarterfinals
Darkhan Nortayev (KAZ)	0
Khalid Al-Blooshi (UAE)	3
Marc Lim (PHI)	0
Abdulmalik Al-Murdhi (KSA)	10^{SU}

Semifinals
Khalid Al-Blooshi (UAE)	2
Abdulmalik Al-Murdhi (KSA)	0

=== Repechage ===
Repechage round 1
Khalil Arnaout (JOR)	0^{SU}
Seo Seok-hyeon (KOR)	0
Darkhan Nortayev (KAZ)	0
Marc Lim (PHI)	3

Contests for bronze medals
Khalil Arnaout (JOR)	0
Abdulmalik Al-Murdhi (KSA)	4^{SU}
Marc Lim (PHI)	2
Mansur Khabibulla (KAZ)	6
