= Arnel Mandal =

Filipino athlete

Personal information
- Nationality: Filipino
- Born: November 10, 1995 (age 30) Iloilo, Philippines

Sport
- Country: Philippines
- Sport: Wushu
- Event: Sanda
Medal record
Representing Philippines
Event	1st	2nd	3rd
World Championships	2	2	0
Sanda World Cup	2	0	0
Asian Games	0	1	0
Asian Cup	1	0	0
Southeast Asian Games	2	0	0
Total	7	3	0
World Championships
Gold medal – first place	2019 Shanghai	52 kg
Gold medal – first place	2015 Jakarta	52 kg
Silver medal – second place	2023 Fort Worth	52 kg
Silver medal – second place	2017 Kazan	52 kg
Asian Games
Silver medal – second place	2022 Hangzhou	56 kg
Southeast Asian Games
Gold medal – first place	2021 Vietnam	56 kg
Gold medal – first place	2019 Philippines	52 kg

Arnel Roa Mandal is a Filipino wushu athlete specializing in sanda. He has won multiple medals in both local and international levels of competition.

== Career ==
Mandal is an Iloilo native and sanda athlete who has fought and achieved medals in local, international, and world championship levels of competition. Specifically, he earned gold and silver medals in the 13th, 14th, and 15th World Wushu Championships and the 8th and 9th Sanda World Cups. When a wushu sanda competitor places highly in the wushu world championships, they are invited to compete in the sanda world cup against other top-placing athletes. Furthermore, he has won gold medals in the 1st Asian Cup and the 30th and 31st SEA Games. Due to a regulation change regarding the age of a fighter, he was ineligible to compete in the 32nd SEA games.

== Personal life ==
For his achievements, he was rewarded with "The Pride of Iloilo Award" by SM City Iloilo. He encourages the youths of his home province to try out wushu.
