= Ju-jitsu at the 2022 Asian Games – Women's 48 kg =

Women's jiu-jitsu 48 kg at the 2022 Asian Games
- Venue: Xiaoshan Linpu Gymnasium
- Dates: 5 October 2023
- Competitors: 19 from 12 nations

Medalists
gold medal	Meggie Ochoa	Philippines
silver medal	Balqees Abdulla	United Arab Emirates
bronze medal	Phùng Thị Huệ	Vietnam
bronze medal	Kacie Tan	Thailand

The women's jiu-jitsu (ne-waza) 48 kilograms Ju-jitsu competition at the 2022 Asian Games in Hangzhou was held on 5 October 2023 at Xiaoshan Linpu Gymnasium.

== Schedule ==
All times are China Standard Time (UTC+08:00)

Date	Time	Event
Thursday, 5 October 2023	09:00	Elimination round of 32
Thursday, 5 October 2023	09:00	Elimination round of 16
Thursday, 5 October 2023	09:00	Quarterfinals
Thursday, 5 October 2023	09:00	Semifinals
Thursday, 5 October 2023	09:00	Repechage round 1
Thursday, 5 October 2023	15:00	Finals

== Results ==
Legend

- SU — Won by submission (50–0)

=== Main bracket ===
==== Final ====
Final
Meggie Ochoa (PHI)	0
Balqees Abdulla (UAE)	0

==== Top half ====
Elimination round of 32
Batbayaryn Odgerel (MGL)	11
Navya Pandey (IND)	0

Elimination round of 16
Meggie Ochoa (PHI)	2^{SU}
Batbayaryn Odgerel (MGL)	0
Saýara Awezmetowa (TKM)	0
Nazgul Rakhayeva (KAZ)	0
Phùng Thị Huệ (VIE)	6
Teh May Yong (SGP)	0
Kacie Tan (THA)	2
Jollirine Co (PHI)	0

Quarterfinals
Meggie Ochoa (PHI)	7^{SU}
Nazgul Rakhayeva (KAZ)	0
Phùng Thị Huệ (VIE)	0
Kacie Tan (THA)	2

Semifinals
Meggie Ochoa (PHI)	4
Kacie Tan (THA)	2

==== Bottom half ====
Elimination round of 32
Gulnur Muratbaeva (UZB)	0
Kim Si-eun (KOR)	6
Nutchaya Sugun (THA)	4^{SU}
Kimberly Cordeiro (SGP)	0

Elimination round of 16
Balqees Abdulla (UAE)	2
Kim Si-eun (KOR)	0
Tömöröögiin Uyangaa (MGL)	2
Assemkhan Issakhanova (KAZ)	2
Wu Guanshan (CHN)	5^{SU}
Anwesha Deb (IND)	0
Nutchaya Sugun (THA)	3
Hamdah Al-Shkeili (UAE)	2

Quarterfinals
Balqees Abdulla (UAE)	2^{SU}
Tömöröögiin Uyangaa (MGL)	0
Wu Guanshan (CHN)	2
Nutchaya Sugun (THA)	6

Semifinals
Balqees Abdulla (UAE)	2
Nutchaya Sugun (THA)	0

=== Repechage ===
Repechage round 1
Nazgul Rakhayeva (KAZ)	2
Phùng Thị Huệ (VIE)	6
Tömöröögiin Uyangaa (MGL)	2
Wu Guanshan (CHN)	0

Contests for bronze medals
Phùng Thị Huệ (VIE)	0
Nutchaya Sugun (THA)	0
Tömöröögiin Uyangaa (MGL)	0
Kacie Tan (THA)	12
