= Ju-jitsu at the 2022 Asian Games – Women's 52 kg =

Women's jiu-jitsu 52 kg at the 2022 Asian Games
- Venue: Xiaoshan Linpu Gymnasium
- Dates: 6 October 2023
- Competitors: 18 from 11 nations

Medalists
gold medal	Asma Al-Hosani	United Arab Emirates
silver medal	Miao Jie	China
bronze medal	Park Jeong-hye	South Korea
bronze medal	Kaila Napolis	Philippines

The women's jiu-jitsu (ne-waza) 52 kilograms Ju-jitsu competition at the 2022 Asian Games in Hangzhou was held on 6 October 2023 at Xiaoshan Linpu Gymnasium.

== Schedule ==
All times are China Standard Time (UTC+08:00)

Date	Time	Event
Friday, 6 October 2023	09:00	Elimination round of 32
Friday, 6 October 2023	09:00	Elimination round of 16
Friday, 6 October 2023	09:00	Quarterfinals
Friday, 6 October 2023	09:00	Semifinals
Friday, 6 October 2023	09:00	Repechage round 1
Friday, 6 October 2023	15:00	Finals

== Results ==
Legend

- SU — Won by submission (50–0)
- WO — Won by walkover

=== Main bracket ===
==== Final ====
Final
Asma Al-Hosani (UAE)	2
Miao Jie (CHN)	0

==== Top half ====
Elimination round of 32
Kristina Zhurabekova (KAZ)	3
Đặng Thị Huyền (VIE)	0

Elimination round of 16
Kaila Napolis (PHI)	2
Kristina Zhurabekova (KAZ)	0
Benyatip Phumthong (THA)	0
Park Jeong-hye (KOR)	0
Ganbaataryn Mongoljin (MGL)
Sezim Askarova (KGZ)	WO
Rohini Kalam (IND)	0
Asma Al-Hosani (UAE)	6^{SU}

Quarterfinals
Kaila Napolis (PHI)	2
Park Jeong-hye (KOR)	0
Sezim Askarova (KGZ)	0
Asma Al-Hosani (UAE)	2^{SU}

Semifinals
Kaila Napolis (PHI)	0
Asma Al-Hosani (UAE)	2

==== Bottom half ====
Elimination round of 32
Mariella Rafael (PHI)	6^{SU}
Putri Siti Nur Farhani (SGP)	0

Elimination round of 16
Im Eon-ju (KOR)	7
Nuchanat Singchalad (THA)	0
Aigerim Kuatkyzy (KAZ)	0^{SU}
Erdenebayaryn Enkhjindari (MGL)	0
Miao Jie (CHN)	12
Anupama Swain (IND)	0
Mariella Rafael (PHI)	0
Hessa Al-Shamsi (UAE)	6^{SU}

Quarterfinals
Im Eon-ju (KOR)	2
Aigerim Kuatkyzy (KAZ)	0
Miao Jie (CHN)	6
Hessa Al-Shamsi (UAE)	0

Semifinals
Im Eon-ju (KOR)	0
Miao Jie (CHN)	9

=== Repechage ===
Repechage round 1
Park Jeong-hye (KOR)	3
Sezim Askarova (KGZ)	0
Aigerim Kuatkyzy (KAZ)	0
Hessa Al-Shamsi (UAE)	9

Contests for bronze medals
Park Jeong-hye (KOR)	2
Im Eon-ju (KOR)	0
Hessa Al-Shamsi (UAE)	2
Kaila Napolis (PHI)	4
