= Meggie Ochoa =

Filipino jujutsu practitioner

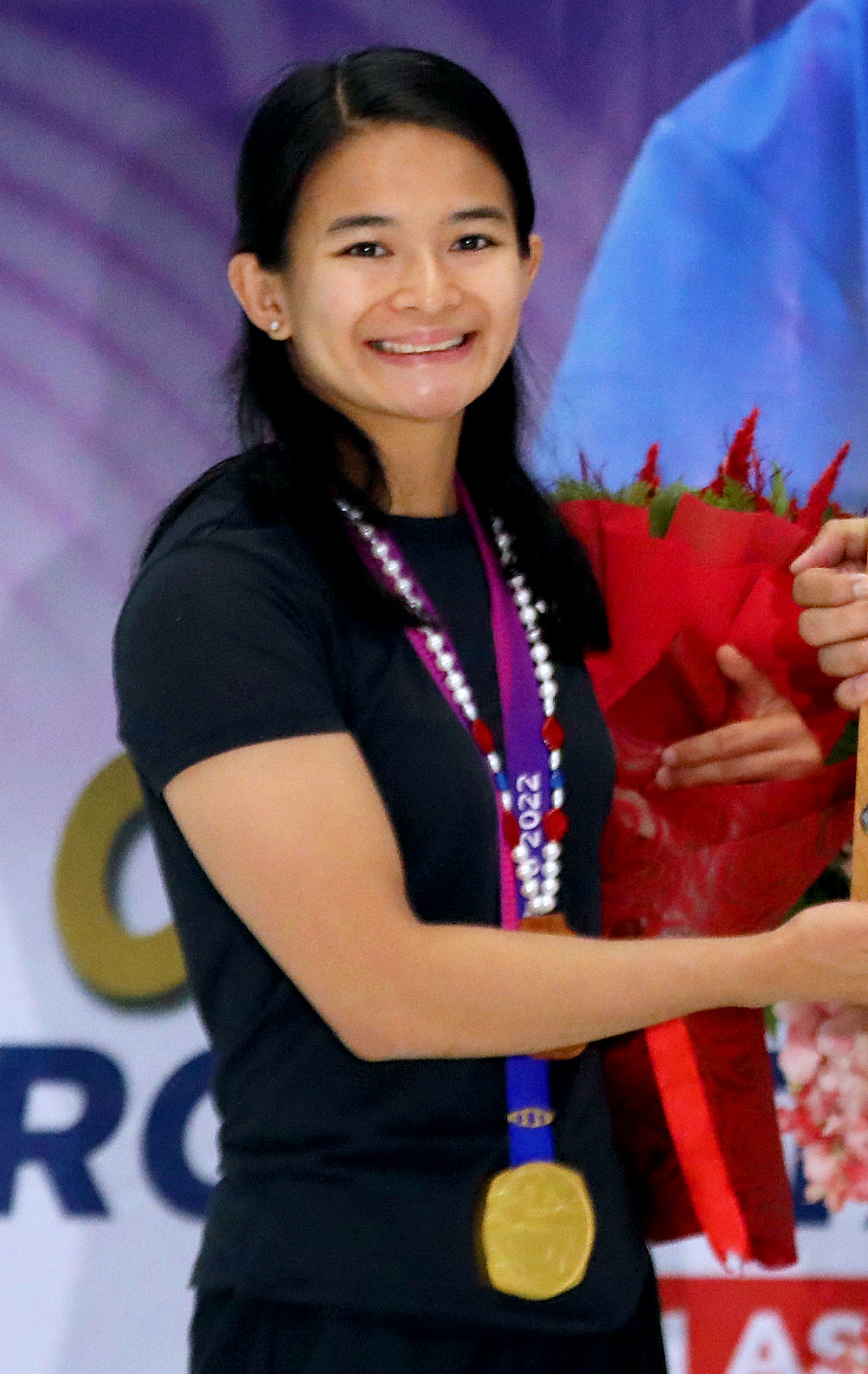
- Ochoa in 2023
- Born: Margarita P. Ochoa; May 6, 1990 (age 36)
- Nationality: Filipino
- Style: Japanese and Brazilian Jiu-Jitsu
- Team: Atos Jiu-jitsu Philippines
- Rank: black belt in BJJ under Andre Galvao

Other information
- University: Ateneo de Manila University

Margarita P. Ochoa (born May 6, 1990), also known as Meggie Ochoa, is a Filipino Ju jitsu practitioner. She also competes in Brazilian jiu-jitsu.

== Education ==
Ochoa was born on May 6, 1990 to Jobert and Lee P. Ochoa She studied at Saint Pedro Poveda College for her basic education, graduating from the school in 2008. For college, she attended the Ateneo de Manila University, where she graduated in 2012 with a bachelor's degree in business management. She was part of her university's track team.

== Career ==
=== Early years ===
After graduating from college, Ochoa took up mixed martial arts (MMA) but she was deterred by the lack of opponents in her weight class at the time. She has a small build and has tried judo before MMA.

She would take up jujutsu in 2013, after changing teams where the coach suggest her to try to martial art. For the next three years she has relied on crowdfunding as she works to obtain a black belt in Brazilian jujutsu (BJJ).

=== Brazilian jujutsu ===
Ochoa is a three-time champion at the World IBJJF Jiu-Jitsu Championship (2014 as a white belt, 2015 and 2016 as a blue belt)

She would participate at the 2018 Ju-Jitsu World Championships in Sweden, where she would become the first Filipino jujutsu champion by bagging the gold medal in the women's BJJ -49 kg. She was promoted to brown belt for the feat.

Ochoa would be promoted to BJJ black belt by August 2022. She added another World Championships gold medal in the 2022 edition held in the United Arab Emirates, this time in the women's -48 kg.

=== Jiu-jitsu ===
Ochoa would also compete in standard jiu-jitsu. She took part in the 2017 Asian Indoor and Martial Arts Games in Turkmenistan, where she won a gold medal in the women's -45 kg.

She has competed in the Asian Games twice. At the 2018 edition in Jakarta, Indonesia she would clinch a bronze in the women's -49 kg event. At the 2022 edition in Hangzhou, China in October 2023, Ochoa won a gold medal in the -48 kg event. She endured a flu which she recovered from only a day after the final match, and a hip injury which she incurred in the semifinal.

At the 2023 Asian Ju-Jitsu Championships in Bangkok, Thailand, Ochoa would win the women's -48 kg title.

Ochoa has also competed in the Southeast Asian Games from 2019 to the 2023 edition across multiple weight class. She has won two golds (-45 kg in 2019 and -48 kg in 2021) and a silver medal (-52 kg in 2023).

She retired from the national team in 2025.

== Personal life ==
Ochoa has worked in a non-profit organization before committing to her sporting career in 2014. She has also been an advocate against child sexual abuse since 2015. She founded Fight to Protect, a non-profit organization which teaches child survivors of abuse martial arts.
