= Annie Ramirez =

Filipino jujutsu practitioner

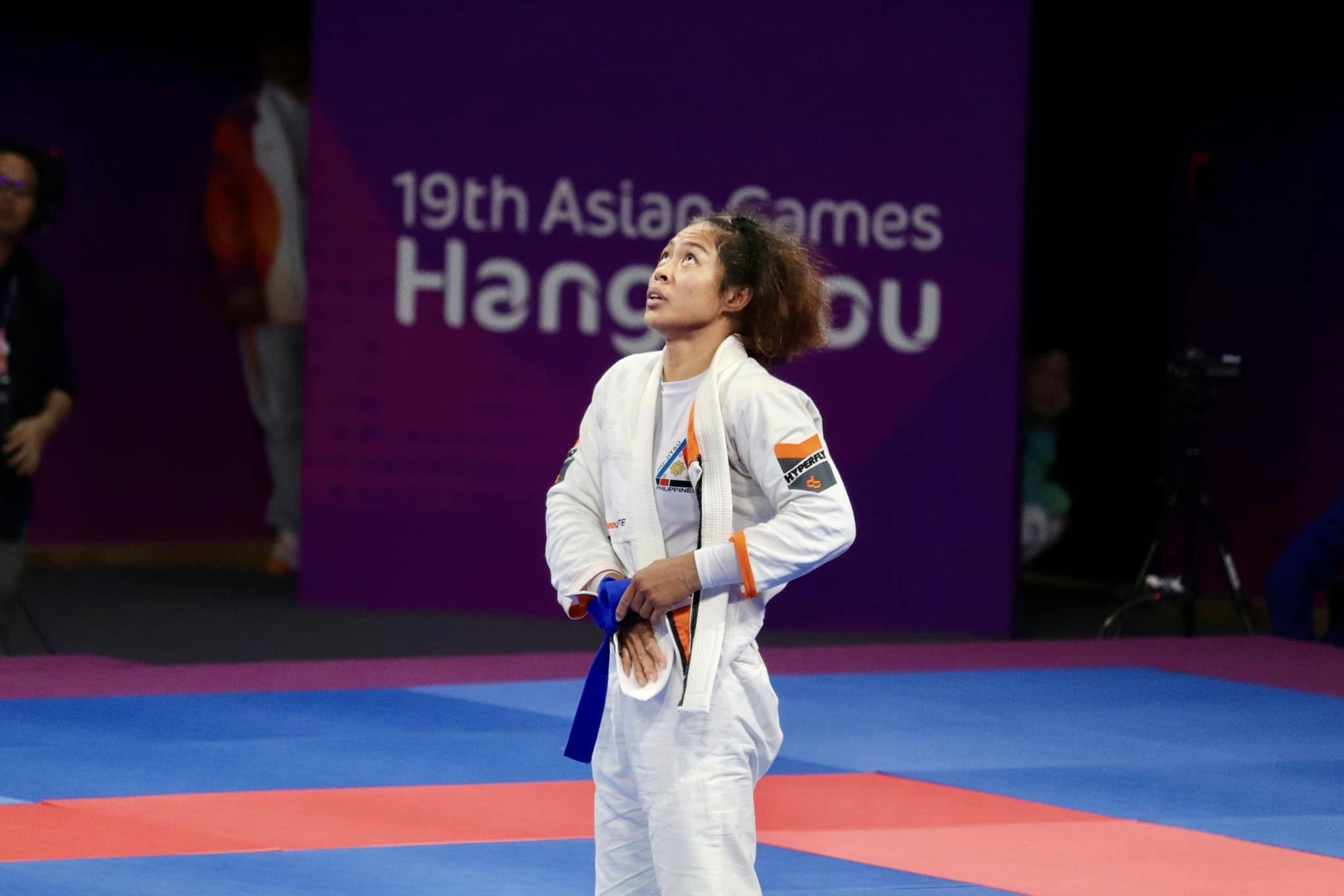
- Ramirez at the 2022 Asian Games
- Born: November 25, 1990 (age 35)
- Nationality: Filipino
- Height: 1.61 m (5 ft 3 in)
- Style: Japanese and Brazilian Jiu-Jitsu
- Team: Clube de Jiu Jitsu Filipinas
- Teacher: John Baylon

Other information
- University: University of Santo Tomas

Annie Ramirez (born November 25, 1990) is a Filipino Ju jitsu practitioner. She also competes in Brazilian jiu-jitsu.

== Education ==
Ramirez attended the University of Santo Tomas 2009-2014 (undergrad) .

== Career ==
Ramirez was originally a swimmer, before taking up judo while at university. She would later learn jujitsu from judoka and Southeast Asian Games multi-medalist John Baylon.

Ramirez would represent the Philippines in international competitions. She was a gold medalist for the Philippines at the 2014 Asian Beach Games.

She won a gold medal at the 2017 Asian Indoor and Martial Arts Games in Turkmenistan in the women's -55 kg.

She competed in the 2018 Asian Games in the women's -62 kg, a heavier class than her usual -55 kg. She was eliminated in the Round of 16.

Ramirez is a three-time Southeast Asian (SEA) Games gold medalist. At the 2021 SEA Games in Vietnam in May 2022, she would compete in a higher weight class at -62 kg since her previous event was scrapped. She still won the gold. She followed it with a third gold medal at the 2023 SEA Games in Cambodia in the women's -57 kg.

In October 2023 at the 2022 Asian Games in Hangzhou, China, Ramirez would win her first Asian Games gold medal by ruling the women's -57 kg.

== Personal life ==
Ramirez is a resident of Muntinlupa City as of 2022 but considers Pamplona, Camarines Sur as her home province.
