= Jordan at the 2022 Asian Games =

Jordan at the multi-sports event

- IOC code: JOR
- NOC: Jordan Olympic Committee

in Hangzhou 19 September 2023 – 8 October 2023
- Competitors: 78 in 17 sports
- Medals Ranked 28th: Gold 0 Silver 5 Bronze 4 Total 9

Asian Games appearances (overview)
- 1986; 1990; 1994; 1998; 2002; 2006; 2010; 2014; 2018; 2022; 2026

Jordan competed at the 2022 Asian Games in Hangzhou, Zhejiang, China, which was held from 23 September 2023 to 8 October 2023. Jordan reached the Asian Games basketball final for the first time.

== Medal summary ==
=== Medalists ===
Medal	Name	Sport	Event	Date
Silver	Zaid Abdul Kareem	Taekwondo	Men's 68 kg	27 Sep
Silver	Saleh El-Sharabaty	Taekwondo	Men's 80 kg	27 Sep
Silver	Hasan Masarweh	Karate	Men's 75 kg kumite	5 Oct
Silver	Fadi Qarmash; Fadi Mustafa; Ashraf Al-Hendi; Ahmad Al-Hamarsheh; Sami Bzai; Ahmad Al-Hammouri; Mohammad Hussein; Hashem Abbaas; Malek Kanaan; Rondae Hollis-Jefferson; John Bohannon; Ahmad Al-Dwairi	Basketball	Men	6 Oct
Silver	Abdelrahman Al-Masatfa	Karate	Men's 67 kg kumite	7 Oct
Bronze	Zaid Al-Halawani	Taekwondo	Men's 63 kg	26 Sep
Bronze	Abdallah Hammad	Karate	Men's 60 kg kumite	6 Oct
Bronze	Mohammad Al-Jafari	Karate	Men's 84 kg kumite	7 Oct
Bronze	Joud Al-Drous	Karate	Women's +68 kg kumite	7 Oct

=== Medals by sports ===
Sport	1st place, gold medalist(s)	2nd place, silver medalist(s)	3rd place, bronze medalist(s)	Total
Basketball	0	1	0	1
Karate	0	2	3	5
Taekwondo	0	2	1	3
Total	0	5	4	9
