= List of Asian Games medalists in xiangqi =

This is the complete list of Asian Games medalists in xiangqi from 2010 to 2022.

== Events ==
=== Men's individual ===
- Standard: 2010–2022

Games	Gold	Silver	Bronze
2010 Guangzhou	Hong Zhi (CHN)	Nguyễn Thành Bảo (VIE)	Lü Qin (CHN)
2022 Hangzhou	Zheng Weitong (CHN)	Zhao Xinxin (CHN)	Lại Lý Huynh (VIE)

=== Women's individual ===
- Standard: 2010–2022

Games	Gold	Silver	Bronze
2010 Guangzhou	Tang Dan (CHN)	Wang Linna (CHN)	Gao Yi-ping (TPE)
2022 Hangzhou	Zuo Wenjing (CHN)	Wang Linna (CHN)	Ngô Lan Hương (SGP)

=== Mixed team ===
- Standard: 2022

Games	Gold	Silver	Bronze
2022 Hangzhou	China (CHN); Wang Yang; Zhao Xinxin; Zheng Weitong; Wang Linna; Zuo Wenjing	Vietnam (VIE); Lại Lý Huynh; Nguyễn Minh Nhật Quang; Nguyễn Thành Bảo; Lê Thị Kim Loan; Nguyễn Hoàng Yến	Hong Kong (HKG); Chan Chun Kit; Tony Fung; Wong Hok Him; Lam Ka Yan
