= Xiangqi at the Asian Games =

- Governing bodies: WXF (World) / AXF (Asia)
- Events: 3 (men: 1; women: 1; mixed: 1)

Games
- 1951; 1954; 1958; 1962; 1966; 1970; 1974; 1978; 1982; 1986; 1990; 1994; 1998; 2002; 2006; 2010; 2014; 2018; 2022; 2026
- Medalists

Xiangqi was included a medal event during the 2010 and 2022 Asian Games both in China.

== Editions ==
Games	Year	Host city	Best nation
XVI	2010	Guangzhou, China	China
XIX	2022	Hangzhou, China	China

== Events ==
Event	10	22	Years
Men's individual standard	X	X	2
Women's individual standard	X	X	2
Mixed team standard		X	1
Total	2	3	

== Medal table ==
Rank	Nation	Gold	Silver	Bronze	Total
1	China (CHN)	5	3	1	9
2	Vietnam (VIE)	0	2	1	3
3	Chinese Taipei (TPE)	0	0	1	1
3	Hong Kong (HKG)	0	0	1	1
3	Singapore (SGP)	0	0	1	1
Totals (5 entries)		5	5	5	15

== Participating nations ==
Nation	10	22	Years
Cambodia	2	2	2
China	4	5	2
Chinese Taipei	4	5	2
Hong Kong	3	5	2
Japan	2		1
Macau	2	3	2
Malaysia	2	3	2
Philippines	2		1
Singapore	1	4	2
Thailand		6	1
Vietnam	4	6	2
Number of nations	10	9	
Number of athletes	26	39	
