= Xiangqi at the 2007 Asian Indoor Games =

Xiangqi at the 2009 Asian Indoor Games
- Venue: Macau International Shooting Range
- Dates: 27–30 October 2007

Xiangqi at the 2007 Asian Indoor Games was held in Macau International Shooting Range, Macau, China from 27 October to 30 October 2007.

== Medalists ==
Event	Gold	Silver	Bronze
Men's individual rapid	Wang Yang; China	Kng Ter Yong; Singapore	Choi Hou Wa; Macau
Men's individual standard	Xu Yinchuan; China	Nguyễn Vũ Quân; Vietnam	Lei Kam Fun; Macau
Men's team standard	China; Liu Dahua; Lü Qin	Vietnam; Nguyễn Thành Bảo; Trịnh A Sáng	Hong Kong; Chiu Yu Kuen; Wong Chi Keung
Women's individual standard	Ngô Lan Hương; Vietnam	Chen Lichun; China	Teo Sim Hua; Singapore

== Medal table ==
Rank	Nation	Gold	Silver	Bronze	Total
1	China (CHN)	3	1	0	4
2	Vietnam (VIE)	1	2	0	3
3	Singapore (SIN)	0	1	1	2
4	Macau (MAC)	0	0	2	2
5	Hong Kong (HKG)	0	0	1	1
Totals (5 entries)		4	4	4	12

== Results ==
=== Men's individual rapid ===
27–29 October

Pos	Athlete	Pld	W	D	L	Pts	CHN	SIN	MAC	VIE
1	Wang Yang (CHN)	6	5	1	0	11	—	2–0	2–0	2–0
2	Kng Ter Yong (SIN)	6	1	3	2	5	1–1	—	0–2	1–1
3	Choi Hou Wa (MAC)	6	1	2	3	4	0–2	0–2	—	1–1
4	Tôn Thất Nhật Tân (VIE)	6	0	4	2	4	0–2	1–1	1–1	—

Source: Xiangqi database

=== Men's individual standard ===
27–30 October

Pos	Athlete	Pld	W	D	L	Pts	CHN	VIE	MAC	SIN	MAS
1	Xu Yinchuan (CHN)	4	2	2	0	6	—	2–0	1–1	2–0	1–1
2	Nguyễn Vũ Quân (VIE)	4	2	1	1	5	0–2	—	2–0	1–1	2–0
3	Lei Kam Fun (MAC)	4	1	2	1	4	1–1	0–2	—	2–0	1–1
4	Alvin Woo (SIN)	4	1	1	2	3	0–2	1–1	0–2	—	2–0
5	Lay Kam Hock (MAS)	4	0	2	2	2	1–1	0–2	1–1	0–2	—

Source: Xiangqi database

=== Men's team standard ===
27–30 October

Pos	Team	Pld	W	D	L	MP	GP	CHN	VIE	HKG	MAS	MAC	CAM
1	China	5	5	0	0	10	18	—	3–1	4–0	4–0	3–1	4–0
2	Vietnam	5	3	1	1	7	14	1–3	—	3–1	4–0	2–2	4–0
3	Hong Kong	5	3	0	2	6	12	0–4	1–3	—	4–0	4–0	3–1
4	Malaysia	5	2	0	3	4	7	0–4	0–4	0–4	—	3–1	4–0
5	Macau	5	0	2	3	2	6	1–3	2–2	0–4	1–3	—	2–2
6	Cambodia	5	0	1	4	1	3	0–4	0–4	1–3	0–4	2–2	—

Source: Xiangqi database

=== Women's individual standard ===
27–30 October

Pos	Athlete	Pld	W	D	L	Pts	VIE	CHN	SIN	MAS	MAC
1	Ngô Lan Hương (VIE)	4	3	1	0	7	—	1–1	2–0	2–0	2–0
2	Chen Lichun (CHN)	4	3	1	0	7	1–1	—	2–0	2–0	2–0
3	Teo Sim Hua (SIN)	4	2	0	2	4	0–2	0–2	—	2–0	2–0
4	Khoo Chin Chin (MAS)	4	1	0	3	2	0–2	0–2	0–2	—	2–0
5	Chan Chi Mui (MAC)	4	0	0	4	0	0–2	0–2	0–2	0–2	—

Source: Xiangqi database
- Ngô Lan Hương of Vietnam tied with Chen Lichun in score but defeated the latter by one extra black-win to seize the gold medal.
