= Taekwondo at the 2026 Asian Games – Women's +67 kg =

Taekwondo competition

Women's +67 kg at the 2026 Asian Games
- Venue: Toyohashi City General Gymnasium
- Date: 3 October 2026
- Competitors: 14 from 14 nations

Medalists
gold medal	Song Da-bin	South Korea
silver medal	Mu Wenzhe	China
bronze medal	Svetlana Saidova	Uzbekistan
bronze medal	Fatemeh Ahmadi	Iran

The women's +67 kilograms event at the 2026 Asian Games took place on 3 October 2026 at Toyohashi City General Gymnasium, Toyohashi, Japan.

Each bout consisted of up to three rounds, lasting two minutes apiece. The athlete who scored more points in each round was the winner of that round; the bout finished when one athlete had won two rounds (and thus the match).

== Schedule ==
All times are Japan Standard Time (UTC+09:00)

Date	Time	Event
Saturday, 3 October 2026	09:00	Round of 16
Saturday, 3 October 2026	09:00	Quarterfinals
Saturday, 3 October 2026	14:30	Semifinals
Saturday, 3 October 2026	14:30	Gold medal contest

== Results ==
Legend

- P — Won by punitive declaration

Round of 16
Bạc Thị Khiêm (VIE)	6	7
Nazym Makhmutova (KAZ)	2	2
Svetlana Saidova (UZB)	14	7
Cheung Ho Yan (HKG)	0	0
Kannaluck Chuenchooklin (THA)	15	14
Jyoti Yadav (IND)	4	2
Fatemeh Ahmadi (IRI)	2	0
Lin Yi-chen (TPE)	0	0
Noor Nazar Mohammed (QAT)	2	0
Rama Abu Al-Rub (JOR)	6	3
Song Da-bin (KOR)	15	10^{P}
Ola Al-Doseri (BRN)	0	0

Quarterfinals
Bạc Thị Khiêm (VIE)	2	5
Svetlana Saidova (UZB)	4	8
Kannaluck Chuenchooklin (THA)	5	4
Mu Wenzhe (CHN)	13	5
Dunya Saber (KSA)	0	1	0
Fatemeh Ahmadi (IRI)	3	1	5
Rama Abu Al-Rub (JOR)	2	4
Song Da-bin (KOR)	8	13

Semifinals
Svetlana Saidova (UZB)	3	2
Mu Wenzhe (CHN)	3	3
Fatemeh Ahmadi (IRI)	1	0
Song Da-bin (KOR)	7	2

Gold medal contest
Mu Wenzhe (CHN)	2	10	5
Song Da-bin (KOR)	4	4	8
