= Xiangqi at the 2022 Asian Games =

- Venue: Hangzhou Chess Academy
- Dates: 28 September – 7 October 2023
- Competitors: 39 from 9 nations

Xiangqi at the 2022 Asian Games was held in Hangzhou Chess Academy also known as Hangzhou Qiyuan (Zhili) Chess Hall, Hangzhou, China, from 28 September to 7 October 2023.

China won all three gold medals in standard Xiangqi.

== Schedule ==
●	Round	F	Finals

Event↓/Date →	28th Thu	29th Fri	30th Sat	1st Sun		2nd Mon	3rd Tue	4th Wed	5th Thu	6th Fri	7th Sat
Men's individual							●	●●	●	●●	F
Women's individual							●	●●	●	●●	F
Mixed team	●	●●	●	●	F						

== Medalists ==
Event	Gold	Silver	Bronze
Men's individual	Zheng Weitong; China	Zhao Xinxin; China	Lại Lý Huynh; Vietnam
Women's individual	Zuo Wenjing; China	Wang Linna; China	Ngô Lan Hương; Singapore
Mixed team	China; Wang Yang; Zhao Xinxin; Zheng Weitong; Wang Linna; Zuo Wenjing	Vietnam; Lại Lý Huynh; Nguyễn Minh Nhật Quang; Nguyễn Thành Bảo; Lê Thị Kim Loan; Nguyễn Hoàng Yến	Hong Kong; Chan Chun Kit; Tony Fung; Wong Hok Him; Lam Ka Yan

== Medal table ==
Rank	Nation	Gold	Silver	Bronze	Total
1	China (CHN)	3	2	0	5
2	Vietnam (VIE)	0	1	1	2
3	Hong Kong (HKG)	0	0	1	1
3	Singapore (SGP)	0	0	1	1
Totals (4 entries)		3	3	3	9

== Participating nations ==
A total of 39 athletes from 9 nations competed in xiangqi at the 2022 Asian Games:

- Cambodia (2)
- China (5)
- Chinese Taipei (5)
- Hong Kong (5)
- Macau (3)
- Malaysia (3)
- Singapore (4)
- Thailand (6)
- Vietnam (6)
