= Vietnam at the 2022 Asian Games =

- Flag of Vietnam
- IOC code: VIE
- NOC: Vietnam Olympic Committee
- Website: https://voc.org.vn/

in Hangzhou, Zhejiang, China September 23 – October 8
- Competitors: 332
- Flag bearers: Nguyễn Huy Hoàng and Bạc Thị Khiêm
- Medals Ranked 21st: Gold 3 Silver 5 Bronze 19 Total 27

Asian Games appearances (overview)
- 1954; 1958; 1962; 1966; 1970; 1974; 1978; 1982; 1986; 1990; 1994; 1998; 2002; 2006; 2010; 2014; 2018; 2022; 2026

Vietnam participated at the 2022 Asian Games in Hangzhou, China. The event was originally scheduled from 10 to 25 September 2022. However, due to COVID-19 pandemic cases rising in China the event was postponed and rescheduled to September–October 2023.

== Medal summary ==
=== Medalists ===
Medal	Name	Sport	Event	Date
Gold	Phạm Quang Huy	Shooting	Men's 10 metre air pistol	28 Sep
Gold	Nguyễn Thị Mỹ; Trần Thị Hồng Nhung; Trần Thị Ngọc Yến; Lê Thị Tú Trinh; Nguyễn Thị Yến; Nguyễn Thị Ngọc Huyền	Sepak takraw	Women's quadrant	4 Oct
Gold	Lưu Thị Thu Uyên; Nguyễn Ngọc Trâm; Nguyễn Thị Phương	Karate	Women's team kata	6 Oct
Silver	Ngô Hữu Vượng	Shooting	Men's 10 metre running target	26 Sep
Silver	Nguyễn Văn Khánh Phong	Gymnastics	Men's rings	28 Sep
Silver	Lại Lý Huynh; Nguyễn Minh Nhật Quang; Nguyễn Thành Bảo; Lê Thị Kim Loan; Nguyễn Hoàng Yến	Xiangqi	Mixed team	1 Oct
Silver	Nguyễn Thị Ngoan	Karate	Women's kumite 61 kg	6 Oct
Silver	Trần Thị Hồng Nhung; Trần Thị Ngọc Yến; Lê Thị Tú Trinh; Nguyễn Thị Yến; Nguyễn Thị Ngọc Huyền	Sepak takraw	Women's regu	7 Oct
Bronze	Trần Hồ Duy	Taekwondo	Men's individual poomsae	24 Sep
Bronze	Phạm Thị Huệ; Đinh Thị Hảo; Hà Thị Vui; Dư Thị Bông	Rowing	Women's coxless four	24 Sep
Bronze	Lý Hồng Phúc; Phạm Minh Bảo Kha; Bạc Thị Khiêm; Phạm Ngọc Châm	Taekwondo	Mixed team	25 Sep
Bronze	Lường Thị Thảo; Bùi Thị Thu Hiền; Nguyễn Thị Giang; Phạm Thị Thảo	Rowing	Women's quadruple sculls	25 Sep
Bronze	Hồ Thị Lý; Trần Thị Kiệt; Phạm Thị Ngọc Anh; Lê Thị Hiền; Hà Thị Vui; Đinh Thị Hảo; Phạm Thị Huệ; Dư Thị Bông; Nguyễn Lâm Kiều Diễm	Rowing	Women's eight	25 Sep
Bronze	Bạc Thị Khiêm	Taekwondo	Women's 67 kg	27 Sep
Bronze	Dương Thúy Vi	Wushu	Women's jianshu and qiangshu	27 Sep
Bronze	Lại Công Minh; Phạm Quang Huy; Phan Công Minh	Shooting	Men's 10 metre air pistol team	28 Sep
Bronze	Hứa Văn Đoàn	Wushu	Men's sanda 56 kg	28 Sep
Bronze	Nguyễn Thị Thu Thuỷ	Wushu	Women's sanda 60 kg	28 Sep
Bronze	Nguyễn Huy Hoàng	Swimming	Men's 800 metre freestyle	28 Sep
Bronze	Nguyễn Huy Hoàng	Swimming	Men's 400 metre freestyle	29 Sep
Bronze	Võ Thị Phương Quỳnh	Kurash	Women's 87 kg	2 Oct
Bronze	Lưu Diễm Quỳnh	Boxing	Women's 75 kg	4 Oct
Bronze	Đinh Thị Hương	Karate	Women's kumite 68 kg	5 Oct
Bronze	Phùng Thị Huệ	Ju-jitsu	Women's 48 kg	5 Oct
Bronze	Đỗ Thành Nhân	Karate	Men's kumite 84 kg	7 Oct
Bronze	Nguyễn Hoàng Lân; Ngô Thành Long; Huỳnh Ngọc Sang; Đầu Văn Hoàng; Vương Minh Châu	Sepak takraw	Men's regu	7 Oct
Bronze	Lại Lý Huynh	Xiangqi	Men's individual	7 Oct

Medals by sport
Sport	1st place, gold medalist(s)	2nd place, silver medalist(s)	3rd place, bronze medalist(s)	Total
Boxing	0	0	1	1
Ju-jitsu	0	0	1	1
Karate	1	1	2	3
Kurash	0	0	1	1
Sepak takraw	1	1	1	1
Shooting	1	1	1	3
Gymnastics	0	1	0	1
Rowing	0	0	3	3
Wushu	0	0	3	3
Taekwondo	0	0	3	3
Swimming	0	0	2	2
Xiangqi	0	1	1	1
Total	3	5	19	27

Medals by day
Day	Date	1st place, gold medalist(s)	2nd place, silver medalist(s)	3rd place, bronze medalist(s)	Total
1	24 September	0	0	2	2
2	25 September	0	0	3	3
3	26 September	0	1	0	1
4	27 September	0	0	2	2
5	28 September	1	1	4	6
6	29 September	0	0	1	1
7	30 September	0	0	0	0
8	1 October	0	1	0	1
9	2 October	0	0	1	1
10	3 October	0	0	0	0
11	4 October	1	0	1	2
12	5 October	0	0	2	2
13	6 October	1	1	0	2
14	7 October	0	1	3	4
15	8 October	0	0	0	0
Total		3	5	19	2

== Athletics ==
Track & road events

Athlete	Event	Heat		Semifinal		Final	
Athlete	Event	Result	Rank	Result	Rank	Result	Rank
Lương Đức Phước	Men's 1500 metres	3:53.97	5 Q	—N/a		3:51.65	11
Nguyễn Trung Cường	Men's 3000 metres steeplechase	—N/a		—N/a		DSQ	
Trần Thị Nhi Yến	Women's 100 metres	11.59	3 q	—N/a		11.58	8
Trần Thị Nhi Yến	Women's 200 metres	23.74	4 q	—N/a		23.85	7
Hoàng Thị Ánh Thục	Women's 400 metres	55.00	3 q	—N/a		55.61	8
Hoàng Thị Minh Hạnh	Women's 400 metres	53.49	2 Q	—N/a		53.91	6
Nguyễn Thị Thu Hà	Women's 800 metres	2:08:06	3	—N/a		Did not advance	
Nguyễn Thị Oanh	Women's 1500 metres	—N/a		—N/a		4:24.19	7
Nguyễn Thị Huyền	Women's 400 metres hurdles	58.49	4	—N/a		Did not advance	
Nguyễn Thị Oanh	Women's 3000 metres steeplechase	—N/a		—N/a		9:57.13	6
Nguyễn Thị Ngọc; Hoàng Thị Minh Hạnh; Nguyễn Thị Huyền; Nguyễn Thị Hằng	Women's 4 × 400 metres relay	—N/a		—N/a		3:31.61	4

Field events

Athlete	Event	Qualification		Final	
Athlete	Event	Distance	Position	Distance	Position
Bùi Thị Thu Thảo	Women's long jump	—N/a		6.09	8
Nguyễn Thị Hường	Women's triple jump	—N/a		13.34	5

== Badminton ==
Men

Athlete	Event	First round	Second round	Third round	Quarterfinals	Semifinals	Final	
Athlete	Event	Opposition Score	Opposition Score	Opposition Score	Opposition Score	Opposition Score	Opposition Score	Rank
Lê Đức Phát	Singles	Kidambi (IND); L 0-2	Did not advance					
Nguyễn Hải Đăng	Singles	Bye	Vitidsarn (THA); L 1-2	Did not advance				

Women

Athlete	Event	First round	Second round	Third round	Quarterfinals	Semifinals	Final	
Athlete	Event	Opposition Score	Opposition Score	Opposition Score	Opposition Score	Opposition Score	Opposition Score	Rank
Nguyễn Thùy Linh	Singles	Bye	Shahzad (PAK); W 2-0	Ongbamrungtham (THA); L 0-2	Did not advance			
Vũ Thị Anh Thư	Singles	Bye	Goh (MAS); L 0-2	Did not advance				

== Boxing ==
Men

Athlete	Event	Round of 32	Round of 16	Quarterfinals	Semifinals	Final	Rank
Athlete	Event	Opposition Result	Opposition Result	Opposition Result	Opposition Result	Opposition Result	Rank
Nguyễn Minh Cường	51 kg	Bye	Zhang (CHN); L 0-5	Did not advance			
Nguyễn Văn Đương	57 kg	Lama (NEP); W 4-0	Khalokov (UZB); L 0-5	Did not advance			
Bùi Phước Tùng	71 kg	Bye	Dev (IND); L KO	Did not advance			
Nguyễn Mạnh Cường	80 kg	Bye	Marcial (PHI); L 0-5	Did not advance			

Women

Athlete	Event	Round of 32	Round of 16	Quarterfinals	Semifinals	Final	Rank
Athlete	Event	Opposition Result	Opposition Result	Opposition Result	Opposition Result	Opposition Result	Rank
Nguyễn Thị Tâm	50 kg	Zareem (IND); L 0-5	Did not advance				
Nguyễn Thị Ngọc Trân	54 kg	—N/a	Olimova (TJK); W 5-0	Shahzad (PRK); L 0-5	Did not advance		
Nguyễn Huyền Trân	57 kg	—N/a	Samadova (TJK); L 0-5	Did not advance			
Hà Thị Linh	60 kg	Sunar (NEP); W 5-0	Yang (CHN); L 0-5	Did not advance			
Lưu Diễm Quỳnh	75 kg	—N/a	Bye	Rana (NEP); W 4-1	Li (CHN); L 0-5	Did not advance	3rd place, bronze medalist(s)

== Canoeing ==
- Qualification: Final (QF), Rest → Semifinal (QS)

Sprint

Athlete	Event	Heat		Semi-finals		Final	
Athlete	Event	Time	Rank	Time	Rank	Time	Rank
Phạm Hồng Quân; Hiên Năm	Men's C-2 500 metres	1:52.899	4 QS	1:55.529	1 QF	1:54.351	7
Phạm Hồng Quân; Hiên Năm	Men's C-2 1000 metres	—N/a		—N/a		3:58.596	5
Nguyễn Thị Hương	Women's C-1 200 metres	53.437	2 QF	—N/a		49.621	5
Ma Thị Thương; Diệp Thị Hương	Women's C-2 200 metres	—N/a		—N/a		50.362	7
Nguyễn Hồng Thái; Nguyễn Thị Hương	Women's C-2 500 metres	—N/a		—N/a		2:08.695	4
Ngô Phương Thảo	Women's K-1 500 metres	2:25.717	5 QS	2:18.977	4	Did not advance	
Đỗ Thị Thanh Thảo; Hoàng Thị Hường	Women's K-2 500 metres	1:59.100	5 QS	2:01.710	1 QF	2:00.150	7
Đỗ Thị Thanh Thảo; Lương Thị Dung; Hoàng Thị Hường; Đinh Thị Trang	Women's K-4 500 metres	—N/a		—N/a		1:49.703	6

== Cycling ==
Road

Athlete	Event	Final	
Athlete	Event	Time	Rank
Quàng Văn Cường	Men's road race	4:36:19	37
Quàng Văn Cường	Men's individual time trial	56:59.72	13
Nguyễn Thị Thật	Women's road race	3:36:07	4
Nguyễn Thị Thi	Women's road race	3:36:39	22
Nguyễn Thị Thu Mai	Women's individual time trial	26:49.37	8

== Esports ==
Individual Event

Athletes	Event	Qualification	Round 32	Round 1	Round 2	Round 3	Round 4	Round 5	Round 6	Round 7	Semifinal	Final	Rank
Hồ Gia Huy	EA Sports FC Online	Sharifi (TJK); WD	Kakhramon (UZB); W	Olzhas (KAZ) W	Liu (CHN) W	Teedech (THA) L	—N/a	—N/a	Park (KOR) L	Did not advance			
Trương Đức Hiếu	EA Sports FC Online	Alsuwaidi (UAE) W	Mujahid (KSA) W	Phatanasak (THA) L	Nuno (MAC) W	Jassim (QAT) W	Nurbakyt (KAZ) L	Did not advance					
Huỳnh Thoại Chương	Street Fighter V	—N/a	Umar Rabil Nuzair (MDV) W	Sitta (THA) w	Rajikhan (KSA) L	—N/a	Wong (HKG) L	Did not advance					
Nguyễn Khánh Hùng Châu	Street Fighter V	—N/a	Ayan Biswas (IND) L	Mamarizo (TJK) W	Ayan Biswas (IND) L	Did not advance							

Team Event

Athletes	Event	Group Stage			Quarterfinal	Semifinal	Final / BM	
Athletes	Event	Opposition Score	Opposition Score	Rank	Opposition Score	Opposition Score	Opposition Score	Rank
Huỳnh Phương Ngân; Nguyễn Đức Việt; Nguyễn Ngọc Anh; Đặng Huỳnh Trường; Nguyễn Sỹ Tuấn Linh; Nguyễn Thị Phương Yến	Arena of Valor	Uzbekistan (UZB); W 1-0	Tajikistan (TJK); W 1-0	1 Q	Kazakhstan (KAZ); W 2-0	Malaysia (MAS); L 0-2	Thailand (THA); L 0-2	4
Bùi Minh Quân; Đỗ Thành Đạt; Lê Quang Huy; Nguyễn Chí Khanh; Phạm Quốc Thắng	Dream Three Kingdoms 2	Kyrgyzstan (KGZ); W 1-0	Nepal (NEP); W 1-0	1 Q	Kyrgyzstan (KGZ); W 2-0	China (CHN); L 0-2	Thailand (THA); L 0-2	4
Trần Duy Sang; Đỗ Duy Khánh; Đặng Thanh Phê; Trần Quốc Hưng; Trần Đức Hiếu; Lê Ngọc Vinh	League of Legends	Japan (JPN); W 1-0	Palestine (PLE); W 1-0	1 Q	India (IND); W 2-0	Chinese Taipei (TPE); L 0-2	China (CHN); L 1-2	4

PUBG Mobile

Athletes	Event	Preliminary round 1		Preliminary round 2		Round of 16		Quarterfinal		Semifinal		Final / BM	
Athletes	Event	Opposition Score	Rank	Opposition Score	Rank	Opposition Score	Rank	Opposition Score	Rank	Opposition Score	Rank	Opposition Score	Rank
Nguyễn Đình Chiến; Phan Văn Đông; Vũ Hoàng Hưng; Lê Văn Quang; Nguyễn Quốc Cường	PUBG Mobile	55:03.586	3 PR2	54:34.333	1 Q	55:00.344	3	Did not advance					

== Fencing ==
Individual

Athlete	Event	Preliminaries		Round of 32	Round of 16	Quarterfinals	Semifinals	Final	
Athlete	Event	Opposition Score	Rank	Opposition Score	Opposition Score	Opposition Score	Opposition Score	Opposition Score	Rank
Nguyễn Phước Đến	Men's épée	Akira (JPN) W 5-4; Kweon (KOR) L 2-5; Noelito (PHI) W 5-2; Roman (KGZ) L 3-5; Khalifa (UAE) W 5-4	3 Q	Nattiphong (THA); W 15-10	Ho (HKG); L 12-15	Did not advance			14
Nguyễn Tiến Nhật	Men's épée	Wang (CHN) L 3-5; Kim (KOR) L 3-5; Abdulrahman (KUW) W 5-4; Ahmed (KSA) L 3-5; Miguel (PHI) L 1-5	6	Did not advance					29
Nguyễn Minh Quang	Men's foil	Cheung (HKG) L 2-5; Chen (TPE) L 1-5; Asranov (UZB) L 3-5; Deejing (THA) L 1-5	5	Did not advance					28
Nguyễn Văn Hải	Men's foil	Choi (HKG) L 4-5; Im (KOR) L 3-5; Wakim (LBN) L 0-5; Dev (IND) W 5-0; Ghaith (IRQ) W 5-4	3 Q	Ali (KUW); L 6-15	Did not advance				19
Vũ Thành An	Men's sabre	Gu (KOR) L 1-5; Mohammad (IRI) L 4-5; Musa (UZB) L 0-5; Voragun (THA) W 5-1; Abdallah (JOR) W 5-3; Mohammed (KSA) L 3-5	4 Q	Nazarbay (KAZ); L 5-15	Did not advance				19
Nguyễn Văn Quyết	Men's sabre	Oh (KOR) L 0-5; Aaron (HKG) L 2-5; Kaito (JPN) L 2-5; Yan (CHN) L 2-5; Mohammad (KUW) L 1-5; Rạendra (NEP) W 5-2	6	Did not advance					23

Team

Athlete	Event	Round of 16	Quarterfinals	Semifinals	Final	
Athlete	Event	Opposition Score	Opposition Score	Opposition Score	Opposition Score	Rank
Hoàng Nhật Nam; Nguyễn Phước Đến; Nguyễn Tiến Nhật	Men's team épée	Philippines (PHI); W 45-29	Kazakhstan (KAZ); L 26-45	Did not advance		8
Nguyễn Văn Quyết; Nguyễn Văn Lợi; Vũ Thành An	Men's team sabre	Uzbekistan (UZB); L 40-45	Did not advance			10

== Football ==
Summary

Key:

- A.E.T – After extra time.
- P – Match decided by penalty-shootout.

Team	Event	Group Stage				Round of 16	Quarterfinal	Semifinal	Final / BM	
Team	Event	Opposition Score	Opposition Score	Opposition Score	Rank	Opposition Score	Opposition Score	Opposition Score	Opposition Score	Rank
Vietnam men's	Men's tournament	Mongolia; W 4-2	Iran; L 0-4	Saudi Arabia; L 1-3	3	Did not advance				17
Vietnam women's	Women's tournament	Nepal; W 2-0	Bangladesh; W 6-1	Japan L 0-7	2	—N/a	Did not advance			9

=== Men's tournaments ===
Group B

Pos	Team	Pld	W	D	L	GF	GA	GD	Pts	Qualification
1	Iran	3	2	1	0	7	0	+7	7	Knockout stage
2	Saudi Arabia	3	2	1	0	6	1	+5	7	Knockout stage
3	Vietnam	3	1	0	2	5	9	−4	3	
4	Mongolia	3	0	0	3	2	10	−8	0	

Source: Football – Men – Groups
Rules for classification: Group stage tiebreakers
19 September 2023
16:00

Vietnam	4–2	Mongolia
Nguyễn Quốc Việt 3', 32'; Khuất Văn Khang 43'; Võ Nguyên Hoàng 65'	Report	Uuganbat 46'; Batmönkh 90+6'

Linping Sports Centre Stadium, Hangzhou
Attendance: 3,300
Referee: Shen Yinhao (China)

21 September 2023
19:30

Iran	4–0	Vietnam
Motahari 4'; Touranian 47'; Mamizadeh 52'; Barzegar 90+2'	Report

Linping Sports Centre Stadium, Hangzhou
Attendance: 6,194
Referee: Mohammed Ahmed Al-Shammari (Qatar)

24 September 2023
19:30

Vietnam	1–3	Saudi Arabia
Aboulshamat 90+4' (o.g.)	Report	Eisa 43'; Maran 87'; Hawsawi 90'

Linping Sports Centre Stadium, Hangzhou
Attendance: 7,008
Referee: Ammar Mahfoodh (Bahrain)

=== Women's tournaments ===
Groups D

Pos	Team	Pld	W	D	L	GF	GA	GD	Pts	Qualification
1	Japan	3	3	0	0	23	0	+23	9	Knockout stage
2	Vietnam	3	2	0	1	8	8	0	6	
3	Nepal	3	0	1	2	1	11	−10	1	
4	Bangladesh	3	0	1	2	2	15	−13	1	

Source: Football – Women – Groups
Rules for classification: Group stage tiebreakers
22 September 2023
16:00 UTC+8

Vietnam	2–0	Nepal
Phạm Hải Yến 53'; Nguyễn Thị Bích Thùy 64'	Report

Wenzhou Olympic Sports Center Stadium, Wenzhou
Attendance: 1,367
Referee: Dong Fangyu (China)
25 September 2023
16:00 UTC+8

Bangladesh	1–6	Vietnam
Parvin 87' (pen.)	Report	Phạm Hải Yến 5'; Nguyễn Thị Thúy Hằng 34'; Trần Thị Duyên 66'; Thái Thị Thảo 78'; Nguyễn Thị Bích Thùy 71', 80'

Wenzhou Olympic Sports Center Stadium, Wenzhou
Attendance: 2,108
Referee: Yu Hong (China)
28 September 2023
16:00 UTC+8

Japan	7–0	Vietnam
Shiokoshi 19', 24'; Chiba 51', 77'; Wakisaka 55' (pen.); Osawa 69', 90+2'	Report

Wenzhou Olympic Sports Center Stadium, Wenzhou
Attendance: 10,174
Referee: Lara Christie Lee (Australia)

== Golf ==
=== Men ===
Athlete	Event	Round 1	Round 2	Round 3	Round 4	Total		
Athlete	Event	Score	Score	Score	Score	Score	Par	Rank
Lê Khánh Hưng	Men's individual	70	66	72	63	281	–7	T27
Nguyễn Anh Minh	Men's individual	68	72	70	73	283	–5	T30
Nguyễn Đặng Minh	Men's individual	71	75	—N/a	—N/a	146	+2	T48
Nguyễn Nhất Long	Men's individual	71	78	—N/a	—N/a	149	+5	T56
Lê Khánh Hưng; Nguyễn Anh Minh; Nguyễn Đặng Minh; Nguyễn Nhất Long	Men's team	209	213	216	223	861	–3	10

=== Women ===
Athlete	Event	Round 1	Round 2	Round 3	Round 4	Total		
Athlete	Event	Score	Score	Score	Score	Score	Par	Rank
Ngô Bảo Nghi	Women's individual	74	75	—N/a	—N/a	149	+5	27
Le Chuc An	Women's individual	75	80	—N/a	—N/a	155	+11	T30
Ngô Bảo Nghi; Le Chuc An	Women's team	149	155	—N/a	—N/a	304	+16	10

== Rowing ==
Men

Athlete	Event	Heat		Repechage		Final	
Athlete	Event	Time	Rank	Time	Rank	Time	Rank
Như Đình Nam; Bùi Văn Hoàn; Nguyễn Văn Hà; Nguyễn Văn Hiếu	Quadruple scull	6:22.66	3 R	6:17.52	3 FA		

Women

Athlete	Event	Heat		Repechage		Final	
Athlete	Event	Time	Rank	Time	Rank	Time	Rank
Hồ Thị Duy	Single scull	8:27.26	4 R	8:34.52	1 SA/B		
Nguyễn Thị Giang; Phạm Thị Thảo	Double scull	7:12.57	2 FA	—N/a			
Lường Thị Thảo; Bùi Thị Thu Hiền; Nguyễn Thị Giang; Phạm Thị Thảo	Quadruple sculls	7:02.11	3 FA	—N/a			
Phạm Thị Huệ; Đinh Thị Hảo; Hà Thị Vui; Dư Thị Bông	Coxless four	6:39.89	3 FA	—N/a			
Hồ Thị Lý; Trần Thị Kiệt; Phạm Thị Ngọc Anh; Lê Thị Hiền; Hà Thị Vui; Đinh Thị Hảo; Phạm Thị Huệ; Dư Thị Bông; Nguyễn Lâm Kiều Diễm	Coxed eight	6:33.28	2 FA	—N/a			

== Judo ==
Men

Athlete	Event	Round of 16	Quarterfinal	Semifinal	Repechage	Final	Rank
Athlete	Event	Opposition Result	Opposition Result	Opposition Result	Opposition Result	Opposition Result	Rank
Chu Đức Đạt	-60 kg	Ariunbold (MGL); L00-10	Did not advance				
Trương Hoàng Phúc	-66 kg	Dzhebov (TJK); L 00-01	Did not advance				
Bùi Thiện Hoàng	-81 kg	Bye	Sobirov (UZB); L 00-10	Did not advance			
Lê Anh Tài	-90 kg	Rebahi (QAT); W W/O	Grigorian (UAE); L 00-10	Did not advance			

Women

Athlete	Event	Round of 16	Quarterfinal	Semifinal	Repechage	Final	Rank
Athlete	Event	Opposition Result	Opposition Result	Opposition Result	Opposition Result	Opposition Result	Rank
Hoàng Thị Tình	-48 kg	Guo (CHN); L 00-10	Did not advance				
Nguyễn Thị Bích Ngọc	-57 kg	Aminova (UZB); L 00-10	Did not advance				
Nguyễn Ngọc Diễm Phương	-63 kg	Watanabe (PHI); L 01-11	Did not advance				

== Kurash ==
Men

Athlete	Event	Round of 16	Quarter-finals	Semi-finals	Final	
Athlete	Event	Opposition Score	Opposition Score	Opposition Score	Opposition Score	Rank
Lê Công Hoàng Hải	–66 kg	Barimanlou (IRI); L 0−8	Did not advance			
Lê Đức Đông	–81 kg	Esanov (UZB)				
Bùi Minh Quân	–90 kg	Bye	Atayev (TKM)			

Women

Athlete	Event	Round of 32	Round of 16	Quarter-finals	Semi-finals	Final	
Athlete	Event	Opposition Score	Opposition Score	Opposition Score	Opposition Score	Opposition Score	Rank
Phạm Nguyễn Hồng Mơ	–52 kg	Amanova (TKM); L 0–10	Did not advance				
Đỗ Thu Hà	–52 kg	Shimada (JPN); L 5–5	Did not advance				
Võ Thị Phương Quỳnh	–87 kg	—N/a	Bye				

== Soft tennis ==
Men

Athlete	Event	Preliminary round				Quarter-finals	Semi-finals	Final	
Athlete	Event	Opposition Score	Opposition Score	Opposition Score	Rank	Opposition Score	Opposition Score	Opposition Score	Rank
Nguyễn Nhật Quang	Singles								

== Table tennis ==
Singles

Athlete	Event	Round of 64	Round of 32	Round of 16	Quarterfinal	Semifinal	Final	
Athlete	Event	Opposition Score	Opposition Score	Opposition Score	Opposition Score	Opposition Score	Opposition Score	Rank
Nguyễn Anh Tú	Men's	Sitisak (THA); L 3-4	Did not advance					
Đinh Anh Hoàng	Men's	Mohammed (QAT); W 4-0	Kirill (KAZ); L 0-4	Did not advance				
Nguyễn Khoa Diệu Khánh	Women's	—N/a	Wang (CHN); L 0-4	Did not advance				
Nguyễn Thị Nga	Women's	Malak (LBN); W 4-0	Zeng (SGP); L 0-4	Did not advance				

Doubles

Athlete	Event	Round of 64	Round of 32	Round of 16	Quarterfinal	Semifinal	Final	
Athlete	Event	Opposition Score	Opposition Score	Opposition Score	Opposition Score	Opposition Score	Opposition Score	Rank
Đoàn Bá Tuấn Anh; Nguyễn Anh Tú	Men's	—N/a	Cheong/He (MAC); W 3-0	Jang/Lim (KOR); L 0-3	Did not advance			
Lê Đình Đức; Đinh Anh Hoàng	Men's	Chan/Zheng (MAC); W 3-0	Huang/Liao (TPE); L 0-3	Did not advance				
Trần Mai Ngọc; Nguyễn Thị Nga	Women's	—N/a	Sreeja/Diya (IND); L 0-3	Did not advance				
Nguyễn Thuỷ Kiều My; Nguyễn Khoa Diệu Khánh	Women's	—N/a	Wanwisa/Jinnipa (THA); L 0-3	Did not advance				
Lê Đình Đức; Nguyễn Thị Nga	Mixed	—N/a	Lin/Wang (CHN); L 0-3	Did not advance				
Đinh Anh Hoàng; Trần Mai Ngọc	Mixed	Clarence/Zeng (SGP); L 1-3	Did not advance					

Team

Athlete	Event	Group stage				Round of 16	Quarter-finals	Semifinals	Final	Rank
Athlete	Event	Opposition Score	Opposition Score	Opposition Score	Rank	Opposition Score	Opposition Score	Opposition Score	Opposition Score	Rank
Lê Đình Đức; Đoàn Bá Tuấn Anh; Nguyễn Anh Tú; Đinh Anh Hoàng; Lê Tiến Đạt	Men's team	China (CHN); L 0-3	Saudi Arabia (KSA); W 3-1	—N/a	2 Q	Iran (IRN); L 0-3	Did not advance			
Trần Mai Ngọc; Bùi Ngọc Lan; Nguyễn Khoa Diệu Khánh; Nguyễn Thuỷ Kiều My; Nguyễn Thị Nga	Women's Team	Japan (JPN); L 0-3	Mongolia (MGL); W 3-0	—N/a	2 Q	Uzbekistan (UZB); W 3-0	China (CHN); L 0-3	Did not advance		

== Taekwondo ==
Poomsae

Athlete	Event	Round of 16	Quarter-final	Semi-final	Final	
Athlete	Event	Opposition Score	Opposition Score	Opposition Score	Opposition Score	Rank
Trần Hồ Duy	Men's individual	Chan (HKG); W 7.78–7.65	Moghis (KSA); W 7.49–7.23	Kang (KOR); L 7.12–7.41	Did not advance	3rd place, bronze medalist(s)
Nguyễn Thị Kim Hà	Women's individual	Akbar (QAT); W 7.59–6.60	Cha (KOR); L 7.82–7.83	Did not advance		

Kyorugi

Athlete	Event	Round of 32	Round of 16	Quarter-final	Semi-final	Final	
Athlete	Event	Opposition Score	Opposition Score	Opposition Score	Opposition Score	Opposition Score	Rank
Phạm Đăng Quang	Men's −63 kg	Lee (KOR); L 0–2	Did not advance				
Lý Hồng Phúc	Men's −68 kg	Shalan (QAT); W Disq.	Abdul Kareem (JOR); L 0–2	Did not advance			
Phạm Minh Bảo Kha	Men's −80 kg	Bye	Mercer (THA); L 0–2	Did not advance			
Trương Thị Kim Tuyền	Women's −49 kg	Bye	da Costa (TLS); W 2–1	Mannopova (UZB); L 0–2	Did not advance		
Vũ Thị Dung	Women's −53 kg	Bye	Karajanova (KAZ); L 0–2	Did not advance			
Trần Thị Ánh Tuyết	Women's −57 kg	—N/a	Chhoeung (CAM); W 2–1	Luo (CHN); L 0–2	Did not advance		
Bạc Thị Khiêm	Women's −67 kg	—N/a	Delo (PHI); W 2–0	Kim (KOR); W 2–0	Song (CHN); L 0–2	Did not advance	3rd place, bronze medalist(s)
Lý Hồng Phúc; Phạm Minh Bảo Kha; Bạc Thị Khiêm; Phạm Ngọc Châm	Mixed team	—N/a		Philippines (PHI); W 35–26	China (CHN); L 18–88	Did not advance	3rd place, bronze medalist(s)

== Tennis ==
Singles

Athlete	Event	Round of 64	Round of 32	Round of 16	Quarter-finals	Semi-finals	Final	Rank
Athlete	Event	Opposition Score	Opposition Score	Opposition Score	Opposition Score	Opposition Score	Opposition Score	Rank
Lý Hoàng Nam	Men's	Bye	Munkhbaatar (MGL); W 6–1, 6–2	Hong (KOR); L 1–6, 4–6	Did not advance			
Savanna Lý-Nguyễn	Women's	Bye	Okamura (JPN); L 2–6, 6–3, 4–6	Did not advance				
Sophia Trần Huỳnh Ngọc Nhi	Women's	Olimjonova (UZB); L 0–6, 0–6	Did not advance					

Doubles

Athlete	Event	Round of 64	Round of 32	Round of 16	Quarter-finals	Semi-finals	Final	Rank
Athlete	Event	Opposition Score	Opposition Score	Opposition Score	Opposition Score	Opposition Score	Opposition Score	Rank
Lý Hoàng Nam; Nguyễn Văn Phương	Men's	—N/a	Nam / Song (KOR); L 4–6, 5–7	Did not advance				
Savanna Lý-Nguyễn; Nguyễn Văn Phương	Mixed	Bye	Kumkhum / Jones (THA); L 4–6, 1–6	Did not advance				

== Volleyball ==
Summary

Team	Event	First round			Second round			Semifinal	Final / BM	
Team	Event	Opposition Score	Opposition Score	Rank	Opposition Score	Opposition Score	Rank	Opposition Score	Opposition Score	Rank
Vietnam women's	Women's tournament	Nepal; W 3-0	South Korea; W 3-2	1 Q	North Korea; W 3-1	China; L 0-3	2 Q	Japan; L 1-3	Thailand; L 0-3	4

== Weightlifting ==
Men

Athlete	Event	Snatch		Clean & Jerk		Total	Rank
Athlete	Event	Result	Rank	Result	Rank	Total	Rank
Nguyễn Trang Tuấn Anh	61 kg						
Trịnh Văn Vinh	61 kg						
Trần Minh Trí	67 kg						

Women

Athlete	Event	Snatch		Clean & Jerk		Total	Rank
Athlete	Event	Result	Rank	Result	Rank	Total	Rank
Phạm Đình Thi	49 kg						
Hoàng Thị Duyên	59 kg						
Quàng Thị Tâm	59 kg						

== Wrestling ==
Freestyle
Men

Athlete	Event	Round of 32	Round of 16	Quarterfinals	Semifinals	Repechage 1	Repechage 2	Final/BM	Rank
Athlete	Event	Opposition Result	Opposition Result	Opposition Result	Opposition Result	Opposition Result	Opposition Result	Opposition Result	Rank
Cấn Tất Dự	74 kg								
Ngô Văn Lâm	97 kg								

Women

Athlete	Event	Round of 32	Round of 16	Quarterfinals	Semifinals	Repechage 1	Repechage 2	Final/BM	Rank
Athlete	Event	Opposition Result	Opposition Result	Opposition Result	Opposition Result	Opposition Result	Opposition Result	Opposition Result	Rank
Nguyễn Thị Xuân	50 kg								
Nguyễn Thị Mỹ Trang	53 kg								
Trần Thị Ánh	57 kg								
Nguyễn Thị Mỹ Hạnh	62 kg								
Đặng Thị Linh	76 kg								

Greco–Roman
Men

Athlete	Event	Round of 16	Quarterfinals	Semifinals	Repechage 1	Repechage 2	Final/BM	Rank
Athlete	Event	Opposition Result	Opposition Result	Opposition Result	Opposition Result	Opposition Result	Opposition Result	Rank
Bùi Tiến Hải	60 kg							
Nghiêm Đình Hiếu	87 kg							

== Wushu ==
Taolu

Athlete	Event	Event 1		Event 2		Total	Rank
Athlete	Event	Result	Rank	Result	Rank	Total	Rank
Nguyễn Thị Hiền	Women's changquan						
Phan Thị Tú Bình	Women' nanquan and nandao						
Đặng Trần Phương Nhi	Women' nanquan and nandao						
Đỗ Đức Tài	Men's nanquan and nangun						
Nông Văn Hữu	Men's nanquan and nangun						
Trần Thị Kiều Trang	Women's taijiquan and taijijian						
Dương Thúy Vi	Women's jianshu and qiangshu						

Sanda
Sanda

Athlete	Event	Round of 32	Round of 16	Quarterfinal	Semifinal	Final	
Athlete	Event	Opposition Score	Opposition Score	Opposition Score	Opposition Score	Opposition Score	Rank
Hứa Văn Đoàn	Men's –56 kg	Bye	Hak Phommachanh (LAO)				
Bùi Trường Giảng	Men's –60 kg	Bye	Bayu Raka Putra (INA)				
Trương Văn Chưởng	Men's –65 kg	Bye	Nipun Kuruppu Weerasingha Arach (SRI)				
Nguyễn Văn Tài	Men's –70 kg	Bye	He Feng (CHN)				
Nguyễn Thị Ngọc Hiền	Women's –52 kg	Bye		Li (CHN)			
Nguyễn Thị Thu Thuỷ	Women's –56 kg	Bye		Maira Karamat (PAK)			
