= Taekwondo at the 2022 Asian Games – Women's 67 kg =

Taekwondo competition

Women's 67 kg at the 2022 Asian Games
- Venue: Lin'an Sports and Culture Centre
- Date: 27 September 2023
- Competitors: 13 from 13 nations

Medalists
gold medal	Song Jie	China
silver medal	Feruza Sadikova	Uzbekistan
bronze medal	Melika Mirhosseini	Iran
bronze medal	Bạc Thị Khiêm	Vietnam

The women's 67 kilograms event at the 2022 Asian Games took place on 27 September 2023 at Lin'an Sports and Culture Centre, Hangzhou, China.

A total of thirteen athletes participated in this weight category. The second seed Song Jie from the host nation China won the gold medal after beating Feruza Sadikova from Uzbekistan in the final in two rounds. Song won the first round 2–0 and finished the second round 9–3 to win the Asian Games title. Melika Mirhosseini of Iran and Bạc Thị Khiêm from Vietnam finished third and joined Song and Sadikova on the podium.

== Schedule ==
All times are China Standard Time (UTC+08:00)

Date	Time	Event
Wednesday, 27 September 2023	09:00	Round of 16
Wednesday, 27 September 2023	14:00	Quarterfinals
Wednesday, 27 September 2023	14:00	Semifinals
Wednesday, 27 September 2023	14:00	Gold medal contest

== Results ==
Round of 16
Melika Mirhosseini (IRI)	14	9
Indira Basnet (NEP)	1	0
Feruza Sadikova (UZB)	5	11
Sasikarn Tongchan (THA)	4	10
Darin Faraj (PLE)	0	0
Nuray Khussainova (KAZ)	14	10
Bạc Thị Khiêm (VIE)	3	4
Laila Delo (PHI)	1	4
Margerette Maria Regi (IND)	4	3
Chang Jui-en (TPE)	9	13

Quarterfinals
Julyana Al-Sadeq (JOR)	5	3
Melika Mirhosseini (IRI)	5	3
Feruza Sadikova (UZB)	6	10	7
Nuray Khussainova (KAZ)	8	1	2
Kim Jan-di (KOR)	2	4
Bạc Thị Khiêm (VIE)	7	9
Chang Jui-en (TPE)	3	5	0
Song Jie (CHN)	9	4	5

Semifinals
Melika Mirhosseini (IRI)	3	10	6
Feruza Sadikova (UZB)	2	13	18
Bạc Thị Khiêm (VIE)	1	1
Song Jie (CHN)	3	11

Gold medal contest
Feruza Sadikova (UZB)	0	3
Song Jie (CHN)	2	9
