= Song Da-bin =

South Korean taekwondo practitioner (born 2001)

Personal information
- Native name: 송다빈
- Nationality: South Korean
- Born: 12 September 2001 (age 25)

Sport
- Sport: Taekwondo
- Weight class: +73 kg
Medal record
Representing South Korea
Women's taekwondo
Asian Championships
| Silver medal – second place | 2024 Da Nang | +73 kg |
| Silver medal – second place | 2026 Ulaanbaatar | +73 kg |
Asian Games
| Gold medal – first place | 2026 Aichi-Nagoya | +67 kg |
World University Games
| Gold medal – first place | 2025 Rhine-Ruhr | +73 kg |

Song Da-bin (Korean: 송다빈; born 12 September 2001) is a South Korean taekwondo practitioner. She is an Asian Games and FISU World University Games gold medalist.

== Career ==
In May 2024, Song competed at the 2024 Asian Taekwondo Championships and won a silver medal in the +73 kg category.

In July 2025, she competed at the 2025 Summer World University Games and won a gold medal in the +73 kg category. In October 2025, she competed at the 2025 World Taekwondo Championships and advanced to the quarterfinals of the +73 kg category, before being eliminated by Svetlana Osipova.

In May 2026, she competed at the 2026 Asian Taekwondo Championships and won a silver medal in the +73 kg category. She was subsequently selected to represent South Korea at the 2026 Asian Games. During the Asian Games she won a gold medal in the 67 kg category.
