= Xu Yinchuan =

Chinese xiangqi grandmaster (born 1975)

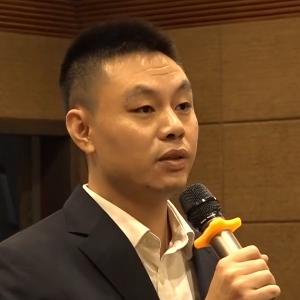
- Xu in 2019

Personal information
- Born: August 5, 1975 (age 50) Huilai, China

Sport
- Country: China
- Sport: Xiangqi
- Rank: Grandmaster

Achievements and titles
- Highest world ranking: No. 1 (January 1999)
- Personal best: 2683 (January 2014, rating)

Xu Yinchuan (Chinese: 许银川; born 5 August 1975) is a Chinese xiangqi grandmaster.

== Career ==
Xu was born in Huilai, Guangdong Province, China, in August 1975. He is one of a handful of grandmasters from Guangdong Province, which is notable for being the home of many famed grandmasters of Xiangqi, including Yang Guanlin, Cai Furu, and Lu Qin. Xu's style is in general compared with Taiji (太极), which means he wins games peacefully. Xu is best in his endgame, which is nicknamed "Ghost Kongfu" (鬼魅残功). Xu got his first championship of national Xiangqi tournament at the age of 18, the second youngest (to Hu Ronghua) ever.

Xu's major achievements in Xiangqi include the following:

- Champion in Chinese National Xiangqi Individual Championship in 1993, 1996, 1998, 2001, 2006 and 2009.
- Starter of the champion team of Guangdong in Chinese National Xiangqi League in 1989, 1993, 1999, 2000, 2001, 2002, 2004 and 2006.
- Champion in the 7th Asian Xiangqi Individual Championship.
- Starter of the champion team of China in the 7th, 8th and 9th Asian Xiangqi Championship.
- Champion in the 6th, 8th and 10th World Xiangqi Individual Championship.

On August 15, 2006, Xu played two games vs the Tiansuo Inspur system. In the first game, Xu played second and the situation became in Xu's disadvantage shortly after opening. However Xu succeeded to tie it. In the second game, Xu played first and this ended in a tie, though Xu had some advantage.
