= Xiangqi at the 2010 Asian Games =

- Venue: Guangzhou Chess Institute
- Dates: 13–19 November 2010
- Competitors: 26 from 10 nations

Xiangqi at the 2010 Asian Games was held in Guangzhou Chess Institute, Guangzhou, China from November 13 to November 19, 2010.

China won both gold medals in individual standard Xiangqi.

== Schedule ==
●	Round	●	Last round

Event↓/Date →	13th Sat	14th Sun	15th Mon	16th Tue	17th Wed	18th Thu	19th Fri
Men's individual	●	●	●	●	●	●	●
Women's individual	●	●	●	●	●	●	●

== Medalists ==
Event	Gold	Silver	Bronze
Men's individual	Hong Zhi; China	Nguyễn Thành Bảo; Vietnam	Lü Qin; China
Women's individual	Tang Dan; China	Wang Linna; China	Gao Yi-ping; Chinese Taipei

== Medal table ==
Rank	Nation	Gold	Silver	Bronze	Total
1	China (CHN)	2	1	1	4
2	Vietnam (VIE)	0	1	0	1
3	Chinese Taipei (TPE)	0	0	1	1
Totals (3 entries)		2	2	2	6

== Participating nations ==
A total of 26 athletes from 10 nations competed in xiangqi at the 2010 Asian Games:

- Cambodia (2)
- China (4)
- Chinese Taipei (4)
- Hong Kong (3)
- Japan (2)
- Macau (2)
- Malaysia (2)
- Philippines (2)
- Singapore (1)
- Vietnam (4)
