= Zheng Weitong =

Chinese former xiangqi grandmaster (born 1994)

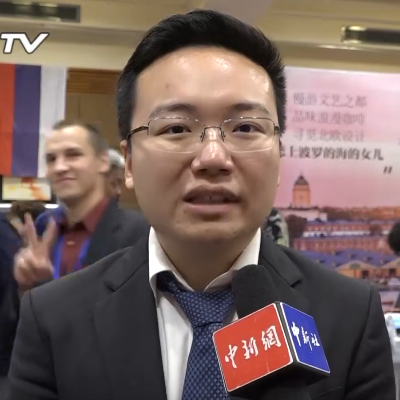
- Zheng in 2019

Personal information
- Born: March 26, 1994 (age 32) Chengdu, China
- Height: 1.70 m (5 ft 7 in)

Sport
- Country: China
- Sport: Xiangqi
- Rank: Grandmaster (stripped)

Achievements and titles
- Highest world ranking: No. 2 (January 2015)
- Personal best: 2755 (January 2023, rating)
Medal record
Men's Xiangqi
Representing China
Asian Games
Gold medal – first place	2022 Hangzhou	Men's individual
Gold medal – first place	2022 Hangzhou	Mixed team

Zheng Weitong (Chinese: 郑惟桐; born March 26, 1994) is a Chinese former xiangqi grandmaster.

== Career ==
In 2014, Zheng won the National Individual Championship and earned the Grandmaster title, becoming the first champion born in the 1990s.

In 2015, Zheng won both the national championship and the World Xiangqi Championship.

In 2020, he began studying business administration at Tsinghua University.

In October 2023, he won the men's individual gold medal in xiangqi in the 19th Asian Games in Hangzhou, becoming the 200th Chinese gold medalist in that event.

In January 2025, Zheng, alongside 40 other xiangqi players (including grandmasters Zhao Xinxin and Wang Yang), were penalized for match-fixing and bribery. Zheng was given a lifetime suspension and was stripped of his grandmaster title. At the time of the suspension, Zheng was the No. 2 ranked xiangqi player in the world.
