= Winston Williams (chess player) =

English chess and xiangqi player (1958–2020)

Personal information
- Born: 20 February 1958 London, England
- Died: 29 July 2020 (aged 62) Bradford, England

Chess career
- Country: Singapore
- Title: Candidate Master (2011)
- Peak rating: 2225 (July 1988)

Winston Williams (20 February 1958 – 29 July 2020) was an English chess and xiangqi player.

== Career ==
He was born in London and moved to Singapore, attending the Anglo-Chinese School and helping them win the Singaporean National Schools Team Championship. In 1974, he drew with grandmaster Paul Keres in a simul, and defeated Max Fuller in a simul against the Singaporean junior squad. In 1975, he defeated grandmaster Alexander Kotov in a simul. He graduated from University of Bonn, Germany, (Engineering). He joined the Singapore Police Force as an Inspector of Police.

He won the non-Chinese section of the World Xiangqi Championship in 1990 and 1991. He held the rank of Federation Master in xiangqi.

He moved to West Yorkshire in 2003. He founded Bradford's "Chesstival in the Park", a festival first held in 2013 that featured exhibition tournaments and simuls held by grandmaster Gawain Jones, Sue Maroroa, and Malcolm Pein. The festival was credited with contributing to the chess scene in Bradford.

== Death ==
He died by suicide on July 29, 2020, after falling from a building. He had been diagnosed with Korsakoff syndrome and suffered from depression. The Singaporean Chess Federation held a tournament in his memory.
