= Lauren Williams (taekwondo) =

British taekwondo practitioner

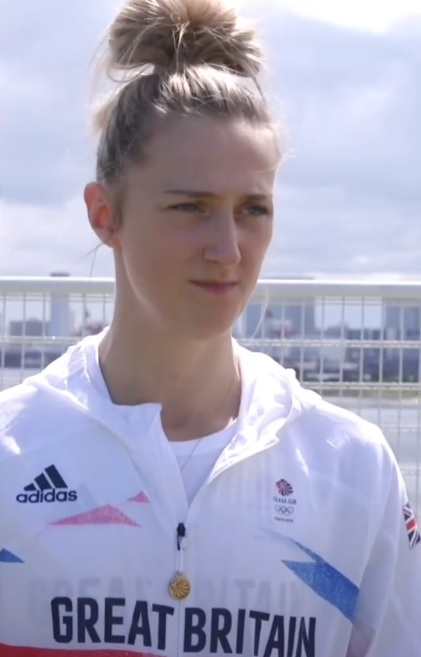

Personal information
- Nickname: Loz
- Nationality: British
- Born: 25 February 1999 (age 27) Blackwood, Wales, United Kingdom
- Height: 176 cm (5 ft 9 in)
- Weight: 67 kg (148 lb)

Sport
- Country: Great Britain
- Sport: Taekwondo
- Events: –67 kg, +67 kg
- Club: GB Olympic Academy
- Team: GBR
- Turned pro: 2013
- Coached by: Michael Harvey

Achievements and titles
- Highest world ranking: 2
Medal record
Women's taekwondo
Representing Great Britain
Olympic Games
Silver medal – second place	2020 Tokyo	67 kg
World Championships
Bronze medal – third place	2025 Wuxi	+73 kg
WT Women's Championships
Gold medal – first place	2026 Taiyuan	+73 kg
Grand Slam
Gold medal – first place	2018 Wuxi	67 kg
Grand Prix
Gold medal – first place	2017 London	67 kg
Gold medal – first place	2018 Manchester	67 kg
Gold medal – first place	2026 Paris	+67 kg
Silver medal – second place	2018 Moscow	67 kg
Silver medal – second place	2019 Sofia	67 kg
Bronze medal – third place	2018 Rome	67 kg
Bronze medal – third place	2022 Manchester	67 kg
European Championships
Gold medal – first place	2016 Montreux	67 kg
Gold medal – first place	2018 Kazan	67 kg
Silver medal – second place	2021 Sofia	67 kg
Silver medal – second place	2026 Munich	+73 kg
Bronze medal – third place	2022 Manchester	67 kg
World Junior Championships
Gold medal – first place	2014 Taipei	59 kg
Gold medal – first place	2016 Burnaby	68 kg
- Updated on 11 October 2026

Lauren Williams (born 25 February 1999) is a British taekwondo athlete who represents Great Britain.

== Career ==
Williams first practised kickboxing for ten years, but switched to taekwondo when she watched Jade Jones win a gold Olympic medal at the "Inspire A Generation" 2012 Summer Olympics. In kickboxing, she had won twelve World Championships titles and 20 European Championships titles. After switching to taekwondo, Wiliams was first selected to be part of the British national team at age 14 and has since been training in Manchester.

In 2014 and 2016, Williams won two consecutive gold medals in the Junior World Championships, first in the 59 kg competition, then in the 68 kg competition. As a senior, she competes in the 67 kg weight class and became European Champion in 2016 and 2018. Additionally, she has received one European silver medal (in 2021) and one bronze (in 2022).

In December 2018, Williams won the Grand Slam Series held in Wuxi, China. Williams has won two gold medals from the Grand Prix Series as well as two silver and two bronze medals, her latest bronze medal win being in Manchester in 2022.

=== 2020 Olympic Games ===
She qualified a quota place for Great Britain at the Tokyo 2020 Olympic Games through the automatic qualification for the top five ranked athletes in each Olympic weight category. In 2021 - as the Games were postponed due to the COVID-19 pandemic - Williams tore her right hamstring three weeks before the taekwondo fights yet won the Olympic silver medal in the under 67 kg weight category, only losing the final to Matea Jelić. Williams later expressed regret regarding the final, which she led by six points until the last ten seconds when Jelić suddenly turned the match around, stating to have had a 'mental block' during the end of the last round.

=== 2021–2024 Season ===
At the 2021 Women Championships in Riyadh, Williams won a bronze medal. She participated in the 2022 and 2023 World Championships in Guadalajara and Baku, respectively.

In 2022, she won a bronze medal in the 67 kg weight class at the European Championships and the Grand Prix, both times in Manchester.

Due to a ruptured hamstring tendon at the 2023 Rome Grand Prix, she did not participate in the 2023 European Games in Kraków and underwent surgery in June. Injuries also contributed to her missing out on selection for the 2024 Summer Olympics in Paris.

=== 2025–2028 Season ===
At the 2025 World Taekwondo Championships, Williams, competing in the heavyweight category, finished with a bronze medal after being defeated by Nafia Kuş. It was her first medal at a senior World Championships. Williams claimed the gold medal at the Taiyuan 2026 World Taekwondo Women’s Open Championships.
