= 2025 World Taekwondo Championships – Women's heavyweight =

Taekwondo competitions

Women's heavyweight at the 2025 World Championships
- Venue: Taihu International Expo Center
- Dates: 27 October 2025
- Competitors: 34 from 33 nations

Medalists
gold medal	Nafia Kuş	Turkey
silver medal	Svetlana Osipova	Uzbekistan
bronze medal	Lauren Williams	Great Britain
bronze medal	Mu Wenzhe	China

The Women's heavyweight competition at the 2025 World Taekwondo Championships was held on 27 October 2025 in Wuxi, China. Heavyweights were limited to a minimum of 73 kilograms in body mass.

== Results ==
Legend

- P — Won by punitive declaration

=== Finals ===
Semifinals				Final
Svetlana Osipova (UZB)	4	3	5
Mu Wenzhe (CHN)	3	3	4	Svetlana Osipova (UZB)	3	5	0
Nafia Kuş (TUR)	2	7		Nafia Kuş (TUR)	2	5	6
Lauren Williams (GBR)	0	3

=== Top half ===
==== Section 1 ====
Round of 64
Alisi Faitangane (TGA)	6	0	0
Jyoti Yadav (IND)	6	6	1

Round of 32
Svetlana Osipova (UZB)	7	13
Jyoti Yadav (IND)	2	0
Rachel Fountain (CAN)	2	0
Chin I-chun (TPE)	7	4
Lorena Brandl (GER)	8	4
Hafsa Chtioui (DEN)	3	0
Linara Muslimova (AIN)	0	5	1
Song Da-bin (KOR)	7	3	3

Round of 16
Svetlana Osipova (UZB)	3	0	0
Chin I-chun (TPE)	2	4	0
Lorena Brandl (GER)	2	1
Song Da-bin (KOR)	9	2

Quarterfinals
Svetlana Osipova (UZB)	1	3	5
Song Da-bin (KOR)	3	2	3

==== Section 2 ====
Round of 64

Round of 32
Tania Castiñeira (ESP)	14	13
Laetitia Barroso (POR)	1	1
Noor Nazar Mohammed (QAT)	1	3
Raiany Pereira (BRA)	3	5
Hannah Keck (USA)	7	2
Naishka Román (PUR)	2	1
Marilena Charalambous (CYP)	0	0
Mu Wenzhe (CHN)	10^{P}	7^{P}

Round of 16
Tania Castiñeira (ESP)	2	1	3
Raiany Pereira (BRA)	1	2	2
Hannah Keck (USA)	2	1	4
Mu Wenzhe (CHN)	0	7	13

Quarterfinals
Tania Castiñeira (ESP)	2	1	1
Mu Wenzhe (CHN)	2	5	8

=== Bottom half ===
==== Section 3 ====
Round of 64

Round of 32
Dagmara Haremza (POL)	8	7
Evgeniya Kaimova (KAZ)	4	0
Famke Kloosterman (NED)	1	2
Paloma García (MEX)	9	4
Astan Bathily (CIV)	12	14
Mariia Kuts (UKR)	9	6
Kalina Boyadzhieva (BUL)	1	4
Nafia Kuş (TUR)	3	5

Round of 16
Dagmara Haremza (POL)	5	2	6
Paloma García (MEX)	0	2	2
Astan Bathily (CIV)	0	0
Nafia Kuş (TUR)	1	0

Quarterfinals
Dagmara Haremza (POL)	0	3
Nafia Kuş (TUR)	1	6

==== Section 4 ====
Round of 64
Lipaz Hajama (ISR)	8	4
Inayatou Harouna (NIG)	15	12

Round of 32
Lauren Williams (GBR)	6	13
Merveille Marindi (GAB)	0	0
Maelynn Fradl (ARU)	0	0
Reba Stewart (AUS)	1	7
Solène Avoulète (FRA)	7	1	0
Agoritsa Kitsiou (GRE)	3	7	3
Inayatou Harouna (NIG)	0	2
Magdalena Matić (CRO)	9	8

Round of 16
Lauren Williams (GBR)	3	1
Reba Stewart (AUS)	2	0
Agoritsa Kitsiou (GRE)	0	7	8
Magdalena Matić (CRO)	8	5	7

Quarterfinals
Lauren Williams (GBR)	4	6
Agoritsa Kitsiou (GRE)	3	1
