= Wang Tianyi =

Chinese former xiangqi grandmaster (born 1989)

Personal information
- Born: April 23, 1989 (age 37) Beijing, China

Sport
- Country: China
- Sport: Xiangqi
- Rank: Grandmaster (stripped)
- Club: Hangzhou Club

Achievements and titles
- Highest world ranking: No. 1 (January 2014)
- Personal best: 2773 (July 2023, rating)

Wang Tianyi (Chinese: 王天一; born April 23, 1989) is a Chinese former xiangqi grandmaster.

== Career ==
Wang was born in Beijing, China and began playing xiangqi at the age of 6, later winning the national U16 youth championship. In 2009, he defeated the reigning national champion Zhao Guorong, earning the nickname "Alien" (Chinese: 外星人) for his unconventional playstyle.

He won the national xiangqi championship in 2012, 2016, 2019, and 2023, and the World Xiangqi Championship in 2013, 2017, and 2022. He is considered one of the strongest xiangqi players of all time, holding the No. 1 ranking from 2014 to 2024. He played for the Hangzhou Club, which won the 2023 Xiangqi League.

In May 2023, he became the first xiangqi player to surpass the 2800 rating mark after defeating grandmaster Sun Yiyang in the national youth xiangqi masters tournament. However, he did not maintain this rating by the time the next rating list was published.

In September 2024, Wang and his Hangzhou Club teammate Wang Yuefei were caught in a match-fixing and bribery scandal, which had earned them around US$113,000. Both players were given a lifetime suspension by the Chinese Xiangqi Association and were stripped of their grandmaster titles.
