= Tang Dan =

Chinese xiangqi grandmaster (born 1990)

Personal information
- Born: 27 January 1990 (age 36) Wuhu, China

Sport
- Country: China
- Sport: Xiangqi
- Rank: Grandmaster

Achievements and titles
- Highest world ranking: No. 1 woman (January 2011)
- Personal best: 2580 (July 2022, rating)
Medal record
Women's Xiangqi
Representing China
Asian Games
Gold medal – first place	2010 Guangzhou	Women's Individual

Tang Dan (Chinese: 唐丹; pinyin: Táng Dān; born 27 January 1990) is a Chinese xiangqi grandmaster. In December 2016, she was China's top-ranking female player with ratings of 2525.

Hailing from Anhui province, she moved to Beijing in 2004 to train under Zhang Qiang. She won her first national championships in 2007. In 2010, she won the gold medal at the Asian Games. She won the Women's World Championship in 2011, 2013 and 2017.
