= Taekwondo at the 2018 Summer Youth Olympics – Girls' +63 kg =

Girls' +63 kg at the III Summer Youth Olympic Games
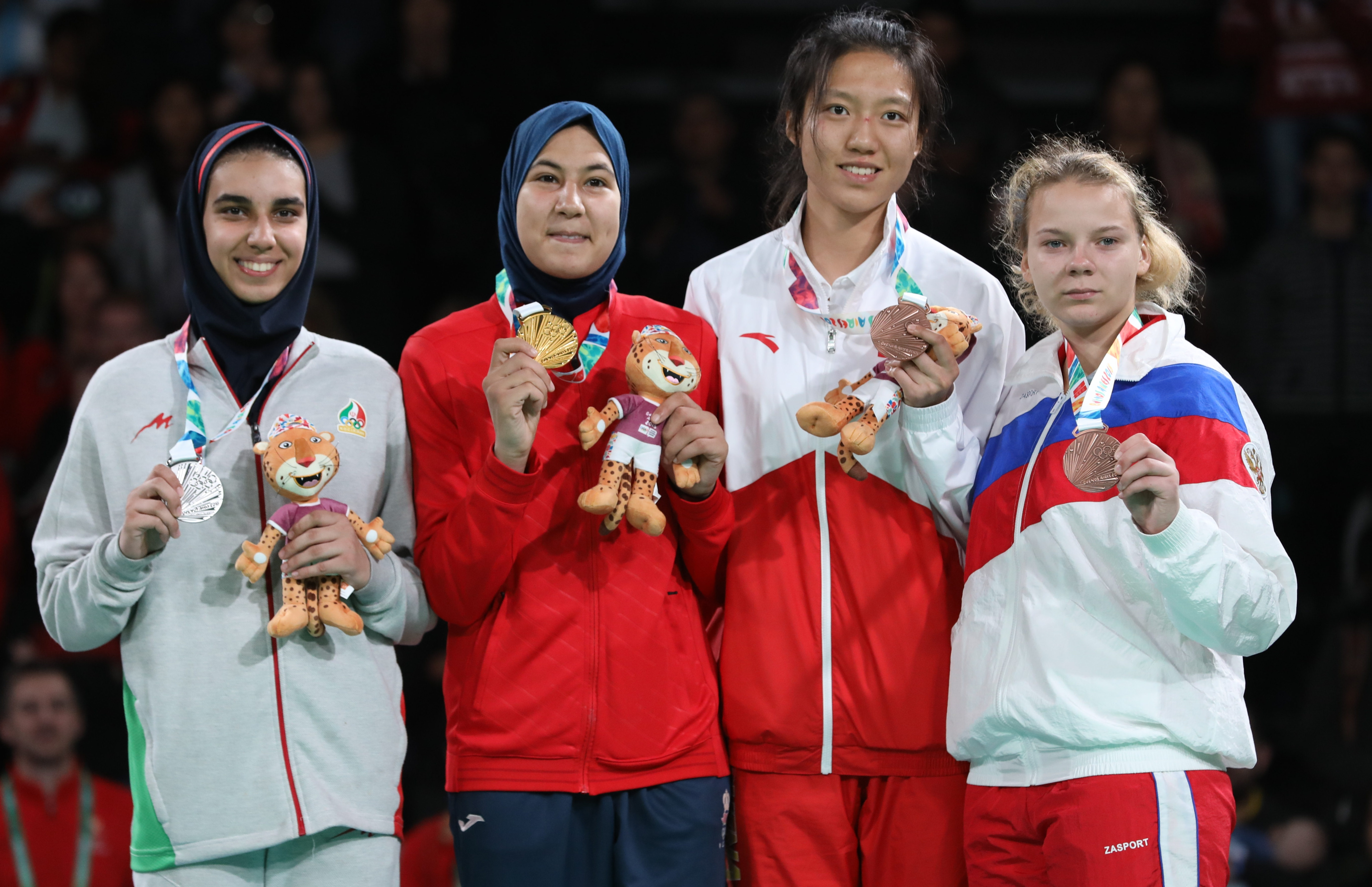
- Venue: Oceania Pavilion
- Date: 11 October
- Competitors: 8 from 8 nations

Medalists
1st place, gold medalist(s)		Fatima-Ezzahra Aboufaras	Morocco
2nd place, silver medalist(s)		Kimia Hemati	Iran
3rd place, bronze medalist(s)		Mu Wenzhe	China
3rd place, bronze medalist(s)		Kristina Adebaio	Russia

The girls' +63 kg competition at the 2018 Summer Youth Olympics was held on 11 October at the Oceania Pavilion.

== Schedule ==
All times are in local time (UTC-3).

Date	Time	Round
Thursday, 11 October 2018	14:00; 19:00; 20:00	Quarterfinals; Semifinals; Final

== Bracket ==
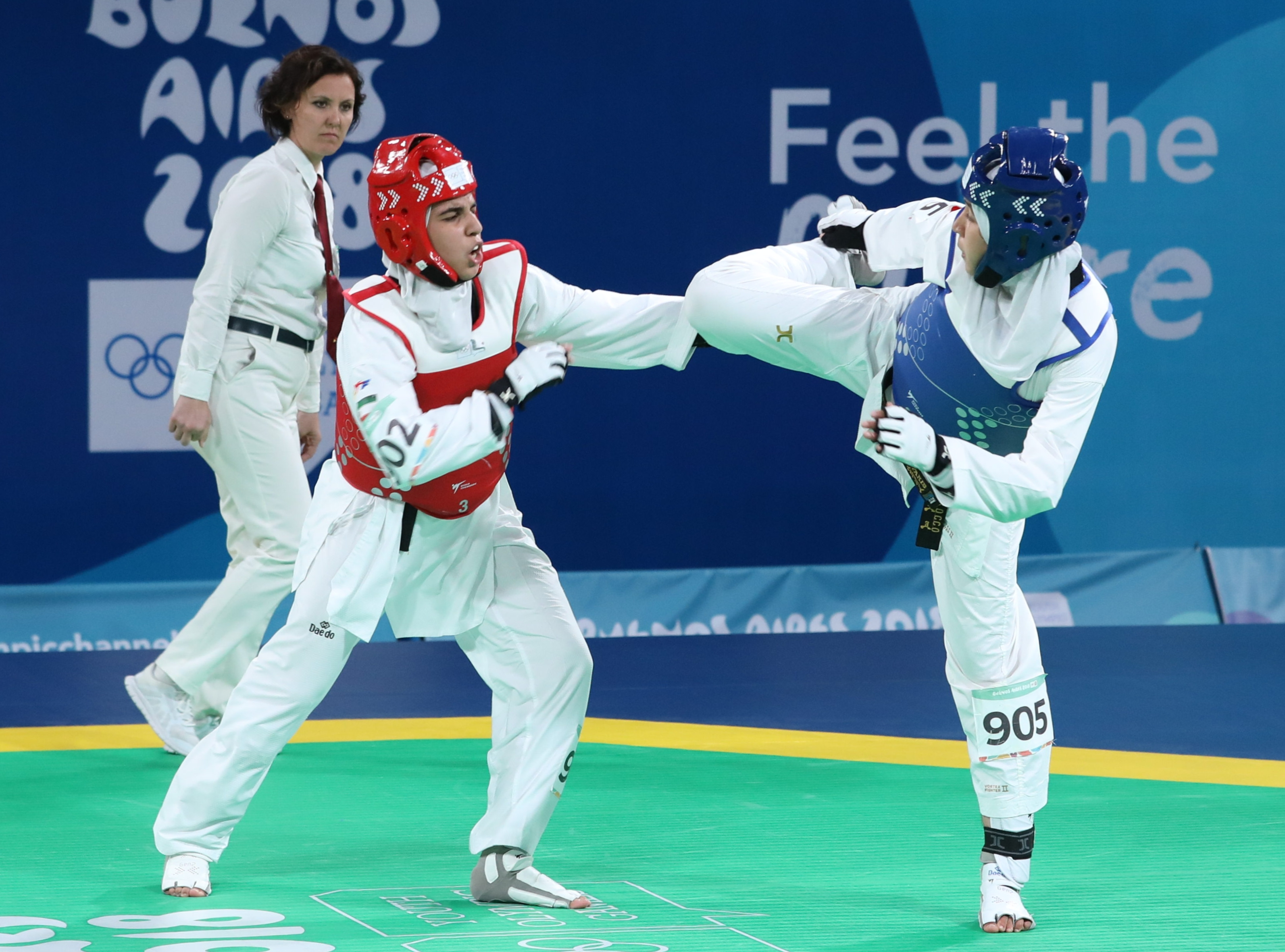
Final: Fatima-Ezzahra Aboufaras vs. Kimia Hemati

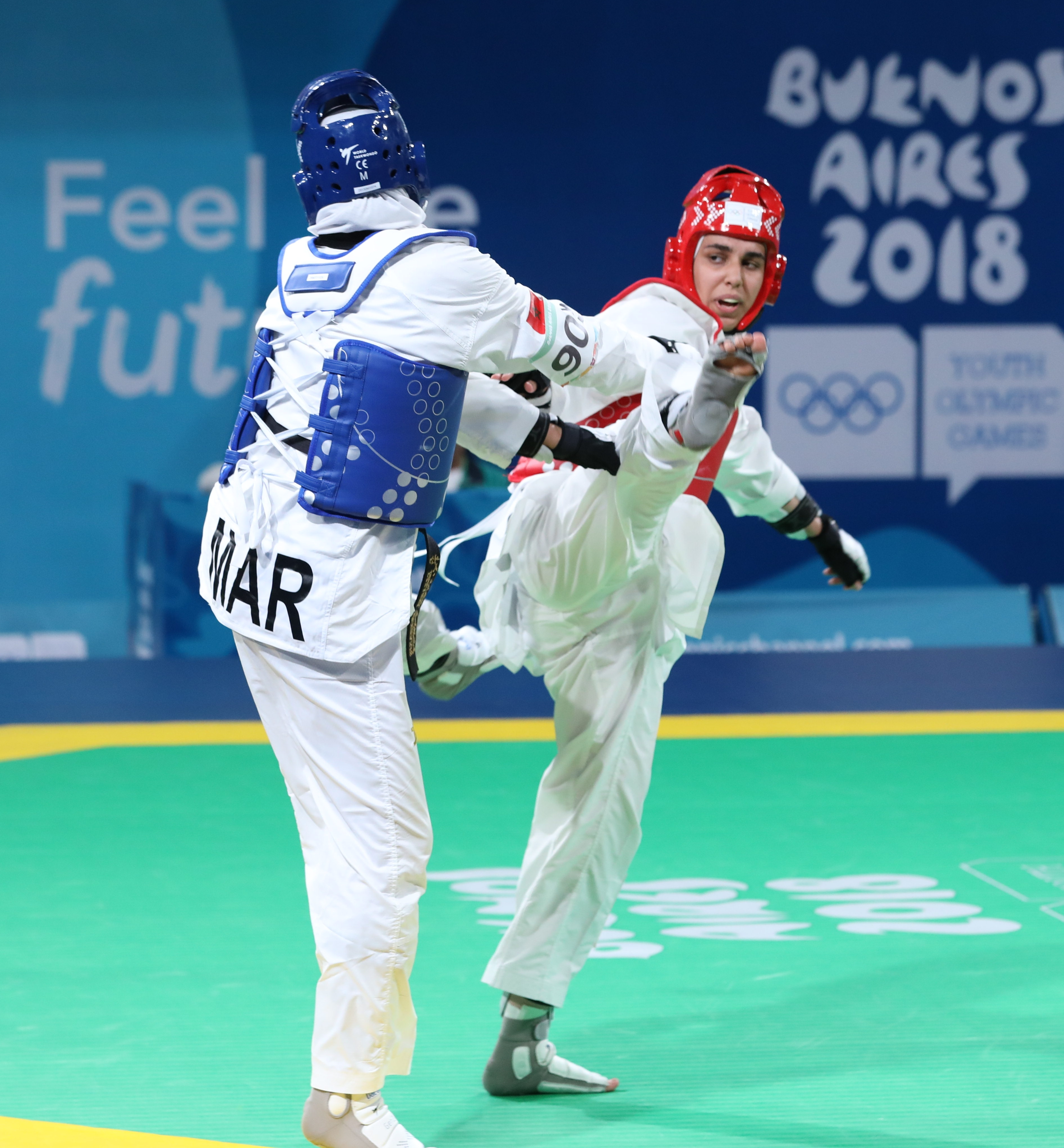
Final: Fatima-Ezzahra Aboufaras vs. Kimia Hemati

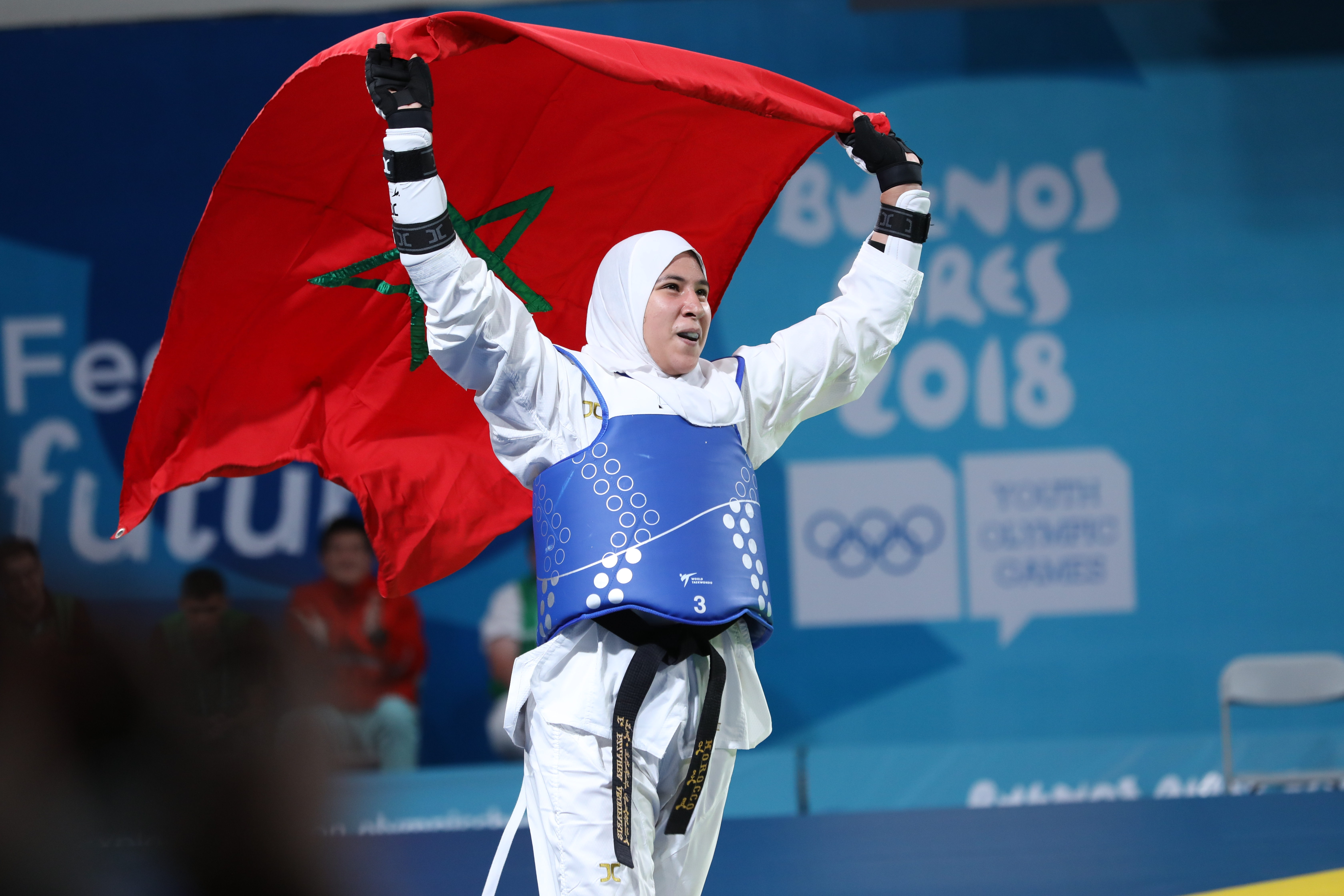
Fatima-Ezzahra Aboufaras (Youth Olympic Games Champion)

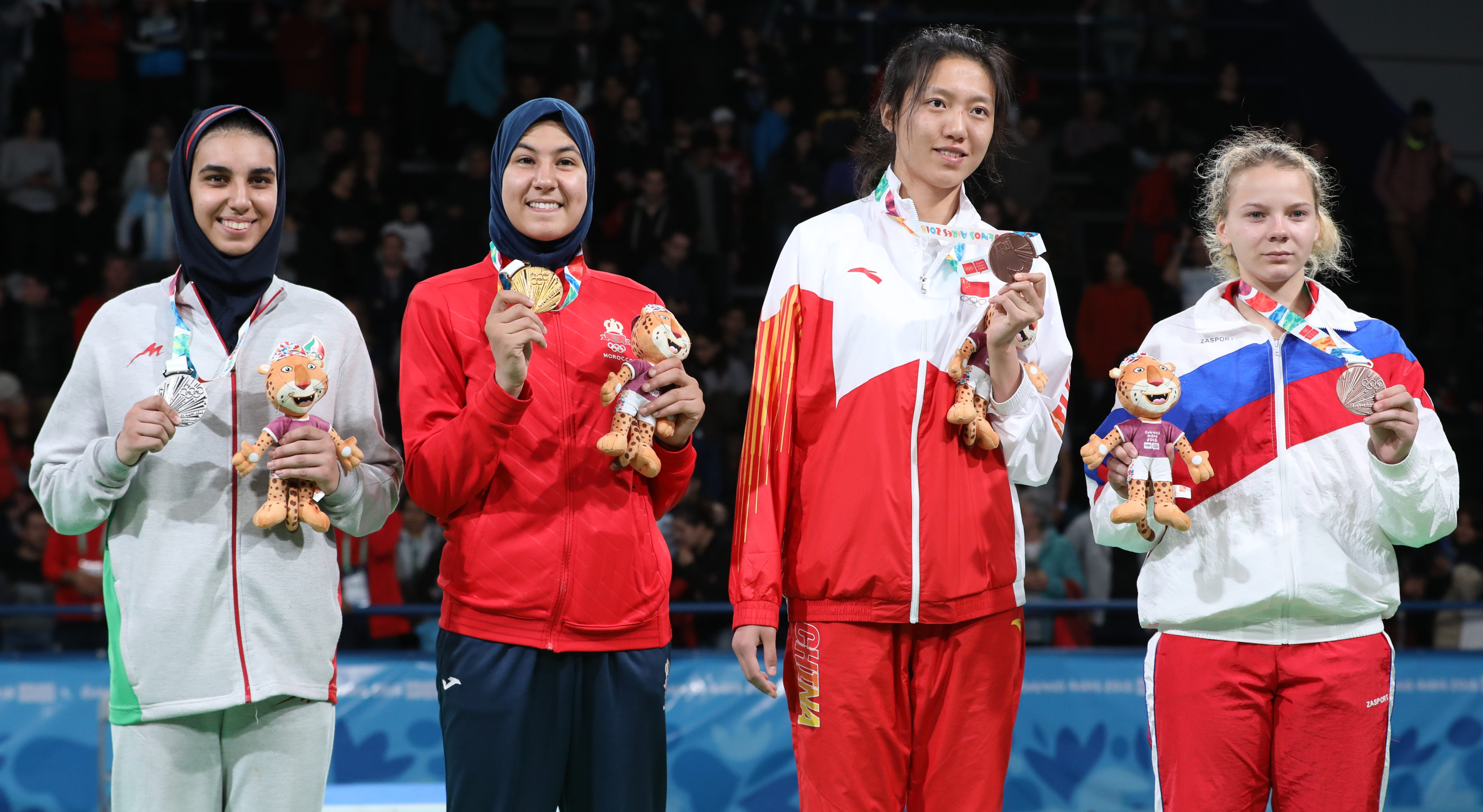
Victory ceremony

Quarterfinals
1	Mu Wenzhe (CHN)	28
8	Laura Ayala (COL)	17
5	Fatima-Ezzahra Aboufaras (MAR)	20
4	Marcelina Koszel (POL)	4
3	Kristina Adebaio (RUS)	4
6	Dilara Arslan (TUR)	2
7	Sharissa Gannaway (GBR)	8
2	Kimia Hemati (IRI)	19

Semifinals
1	Mu Wenzhe (CHN)	2
5	Fatima-Ezzahra Aboufaras (MAR)	17
3	Kristina Adebaio (RUS)	19
2	Kimia Hemati (IRI)	21

Gold medal match
5	Fatima-Ezzahra Aboufaras (MAR)	18
2	Kimia Hemati (IRI)	16
