= Teo Sim Hua =

Singaporean xiangqi grandmaster (1943–2023)

Personal information
- Native name: 张心欢
- Citizenship: Singapore
- Born: 1943
- Died: 11 January 2023 (aged 79–80)
- Occupation: Xiangqi player

Sport
- Sport: Xiangqi
- Rank: Grandmaster

Achievements and titles
- World finals: World Champion (1990); Bronze medal - Asian Indoor Games (2007)

Teo Sim Hua (Chinese: 张心欢; 1943 – 11 January 2023) was a Singaporean xiangqi grandmaster. In 1990 she was the first winner of the women's event at the World Xiangqi Championship, beating Huang Yuying by two points. From 1980 to 1988 she was the runner-up in five Asian Xiangqi Championships (zh). In 1991 she was runner-up in the second World Championships held in Kunming. In 2003, she won the second place in the Asian Chess Individual Championship (zh). In 2007, she won the women's individual bronze medal in chess at the Second Asian Indoor Games. She died 11 January 2023.
