= Xiangqi at the 2022 Asian Games – Women's individual =

Women's individual standard at the 2022 Asian Games
- Venue: Hangzhou Chess Academy
- Date: 3–7 October 2023
- Competitors: 13 from 8 nations

Medalists
gold medal	Zuo Wenjing	China
silver medal	Wang Linna	China
bronze medal	Ngô Lan Hương	Singapore

The women's individual Xiangqi competition at the 2022 Asian Games took place at Hangzhou Qiyuan (Zhili) Chess Hall between 3 and 7 October 2023.

== Schedule ==
All times are China Standard Time (UTC+08:00)

Date	Time	Event
Tuesday, 3 October 2023	14:00	Round 1
Wednesday, 4 October 2023	14:00	Round 2
Wednesday, 4 October 2023	19:00	Round 3
Thursday, 5 October 2023	14:00	Round 4
Friday, 6 October 2023	14:00	Round 5
Friday, 6 October 2023	19:00	Round 6
Saturday, 7 October 2023	14:00	Round 7
Saturday, 7 October 2023	14:00	Final

== Results ==
=== Round 1 ===
Red	Score	Black
Jee Xin Ru (MAS)	2–0	Nguyễn Thị Phi Liêm (VIE)
Lam Ka Yan (HKG)	2–0	Nattharinee Srivachirawat (THA)
Suratsada Promsirinimit (THA)	0–2	Ngô Lan Hương (SGP)
Peng Jou-an (TPE)	1–1	Zuo Wenjing (CHN)
Nguyễn Hoàng Yến (VIE)	1–1	Li Sih-yi (TPE)
Wang Linna (CHN)	2–0	Li Kevin (MAC)
Fiona Tan (SGP)	2–0	Bye

=== Round 2 ===
Red	Score	Black
Ngô Lan Hương (SGP)	2–0	Fiona Tan (SGP)
Wang Linna (CHN)	2–0	Lam Ka Yan (HKG)
Li Sih-yi (TPE)	0–2	Jee Xin Ru (MAS)
Zuo Wenjing (CHN)	2–0	Nguyễn Hoàng Yến (VIE)
Li Kevin (MAC)	1–1	Peng Jou-an (TPE)
Nattharinee Srivachirawat (THA)	2–0	Suratsada Promsirinimit (THA)
Nguyễn Thị Phi Liêm (VIE)	2–0	Bye

=== Round 3 ===
Red	Score	Black
Jee Xin Ru (MAS)	0–2	Wang Linna (CHN)
Ngô Lan Hương (SGP)	0–2	Zuo Wenjing (CHN)
Lam Ka Yan (HKG)	0–2	Nguyễn Thị Phi Liêm (VIE)
Peng Jou-an (TPE)	2–0	Nattharinee Srivachirawat (THA)
Fiona Tan (SGP)	0–2	Li Sih-yi (TPE)
Nguyễn Hoàng Yến (VIE)	0–2	Li Kevin (MAC)
Suratsada Promsirinimit (THA)	2–0	Bye

=== Round 4 ===
Red	Score	Black
Zuo Wenjing (CHN)	2–0	Wang Linna (CHN)
Jee Xin Ru (MAS)	2–0	Peng Jou-an (TPE)
Nguyễn Thị Phi Liêm (VIE)	0–2	Ngô Lan Hương (SGP)
Li Sih-yi (TPE)	2–0	Li Kevin (MAC)
Nattharinee Srivachirawat (THA)	0–2	Fiona Tan (SGP)
Lam Ka Yan (HKG)	2–0	Suratsada Promsirinimit (THA)
Bye	0–2	Nguyễn Hoàng Yến (VIE)

=== Round 5 ===
Red	Score	Black
Zuo Wenjing (CHN)	2–0	Jee Xin Ru (MAS)
Wang Linna (CHN)	1–1	Ngô Lan Hương (SGP)
Peng Jou-an (TPE)	1–1	Li Sih-yi (TPE)
Fiona Tan (SGP)	0–2	Lam Ka Yan (HKG)
Li Kevin (MAC)	1–1	Nguyễn Thị Phi Liêm (VIE)
Nguyễn Hoàng Yến (VIE)	2–0	Suratsada Promsirinimit (THA)
Bye	0–2	Nattharinee Srivachirawat (THA)

=== Round 6 ===
Red	Score	Black
Lam Ka Yan (HKG)	0–2	Zuo Wenjing (CHN)
Li Sih-yi (TPE)	0–2	Wang Linna (CHN)
Ngô Lan Hương (SGP)	1–1	Jee Xin Ru (MAS)
Nguyễn Thị Phi Liêm (VIE)	1–1	Peng Jou-an (TPE)
Nattharinee Srivachirawat (THA)	0–2	Nguyễn Hoàng Yến (VIE)
Suratsada Promsirinimit (THA)	0–2	Fiona Tan (SGP)
Li Kevin (MAC)	2–0	Bye

Ranking after round 6

Rank	Athlete	Score	BH
1	Zuo Wenjing (CHN)	11	43
2	Wang Linna (CHN)	9	44
3	Ngô Lan Hương (SGP)	8	41
4	Jee Xin Ru (MAS)	7	46
5	Nguyễn Hoàng Yến (VIE)	7	30
6	Li Sih-yi (TPE)	6	41
7	Peng Jou-an (TPE)	6	40
8	Lam Ka Yan (HKG)	6	38
9	Li Kevin (MAC)	6	35
10	Nguyễn Thị Phi Liêm (VIE)	6	34
11	Fiona Tan (SGP)	6	27
12	Nattharinee Srivachirawat (THA)	4	28
13	Suratsada Promsirinimit (THA)	2	32

=== Round 7 ===
Red	Score	Black
Nguyễn Hoàng Yến (VIE)	0–2	Ngô Lan Hương (SGP)
Jee Xin Ru (MAS)	1–1	Lam Ka Yan (HKG)
Fiona Tan (SGP)	1–1	Li Kevin (MAC)
Nattharinee Srivachirawat (THA)	0–2	Nguyễn Thị Phi Liêm (VIE)
Peng Jou-an (TPE)	2–0	Suratsada Promsirinimit (THA)
Bye	0–2	Li Sih-yi (TPE)

=== Final ===
Red	Score	Black
Wang Linna (CHN)	0–2	Zuo Wenjing (CHN)

=== Summary ===
Rank	Athlete	Round							Total	BH	HH
Rank	Athlete	1	2	3	4	5	6	7	Total	BH	HH
1st place, gold medalist(s)	Zuo Wenjing (CHN)	1	2	2	2	2	2	2	13		
2nd place, silver medalist(s)	Wang Linna (CHN)	2	2	2	0	1	2	0	9		
3rd place, bronze medalist(s)	Ngô Lan Hương (SGP)	2	2	0	2	1	1	2	10	54	
4	Jee Xin Ru (MAS)	2	2	0	2	0	1	1	8	63	
5	Peng Jou-an (TPE)	1	1	2	0	1	1	2	8	50	
6	Li Sih-yi (TPE)	1	0	2	2	1	0	2	8	47	
7	Nguyễn Thị Phi Liêm (VIE)	0	2	2	0	1	1	2	8	45	
8	Lam Ka Yan (HKG)	2	0	0	2	2	0	1	7	51	
9	Li Kevin (MAC)	0	1	2	0	1	2	1	7	48	
10	Nguyễn Hoàng Yến (VIE)	1	0	0	2	2	2	0	7	45	
11	Fiona Tan (SGP)	2	0	0	2	0	2	1	7	39	
12	Nattharinee Srivachirawat (THA)	0	2	0	0	2	0	0	4	40	
13	Suratsada Promsirinimit (THA)	0	0	2	0	0	0	0	2	44	
