= Song Jie =

Chinese Taekwondo practitioner

Personal information
- Full name: Song Jie
- Born: January 23, 1999 (age 27) Bazhong, Sichuan, China
- Weight: 67 kg (148 lb)

Sport
- Country: People's Republic of China
- Sport: Taekwondo
- Event: -67kg
Medal record
Women's taekwondo
Representing China
Asian Championships
Silver medal – second place	2024 Da Nang	67 kg
Silver medal – second place	2026 Ulaanbaatar	73 kg
Asian Games
Gold medal – first place	2022 Hangzhou	67 kg

Song Jie (simplified Chinese: 宋洁; traditional Chinese: 宋潔; pinyin: Sòng Jié; born on January 23, 1999), is a Chinese Taekwondo athlete from Bazhong, Sichuan.

== Career ==
In the mixed team final of the 2019 World Taekwondo Team World Cup Championships, Song Jie's Chinese team defeated the Iranian team to win the championship.

In May 2022, Song Jie won the championship in the women's 67 kg category of the World Taekwondo Austria Open. In June, she represented the Chinese team in the 2022 Taekwondo Asian Championships. In August, she was selected for the Chinese team to participate in the 2022 World Taekwondo Grand Prix. On September 18, at the 2022 World Taekwondo Federation Slovenia Open, Song Jie won the championship in the women's 67 kg competition.

On January 2, 2023, at the fourth stop of the 2022 National Taekwondo Championship Series, Song Jie won the championship in the women's sub-67 kg category. On January 7, at the 2022 National Taekwondo Championship Finals, Song Jie won the runner-up in the women's under 67 kg category. On March 11, at the 2023 World Taekwondo Federation Dutch Open, Song Jie won the championship in her level. On April 2, in the finals of the 2022 World Taekwondo Grand Slam Championship Series, Song Jie won the women's 67 kg championship.

In June 2023, at the 2023 World Taekwondo Grand Prix in Rome, Song Jie won the gold medal in the women's under-67 kg competition. In July, Song Jie won the silver medal in the F-67 kg event in the World Taekwondo President's Cup (Oceania Region) competition. In July, Song Jie was selected into the 10-person roster of the Chinese National Taekwondo Team to participate in the 19th Asian Games in Hangzhou. On December 19, the finals of the 2023 World Taekwondo Team World Cup Championship were held in Wuxi, Jiangsu. Song Jie's Chinese team defeated the Uzbekistan team 36:30 in the final to win the mixed team championship and won the Paris Olympics demonstration project. Qualifications for the competition.
