= Mu Wenzhe =

Chinese taekwondo practitioner (born 2002)

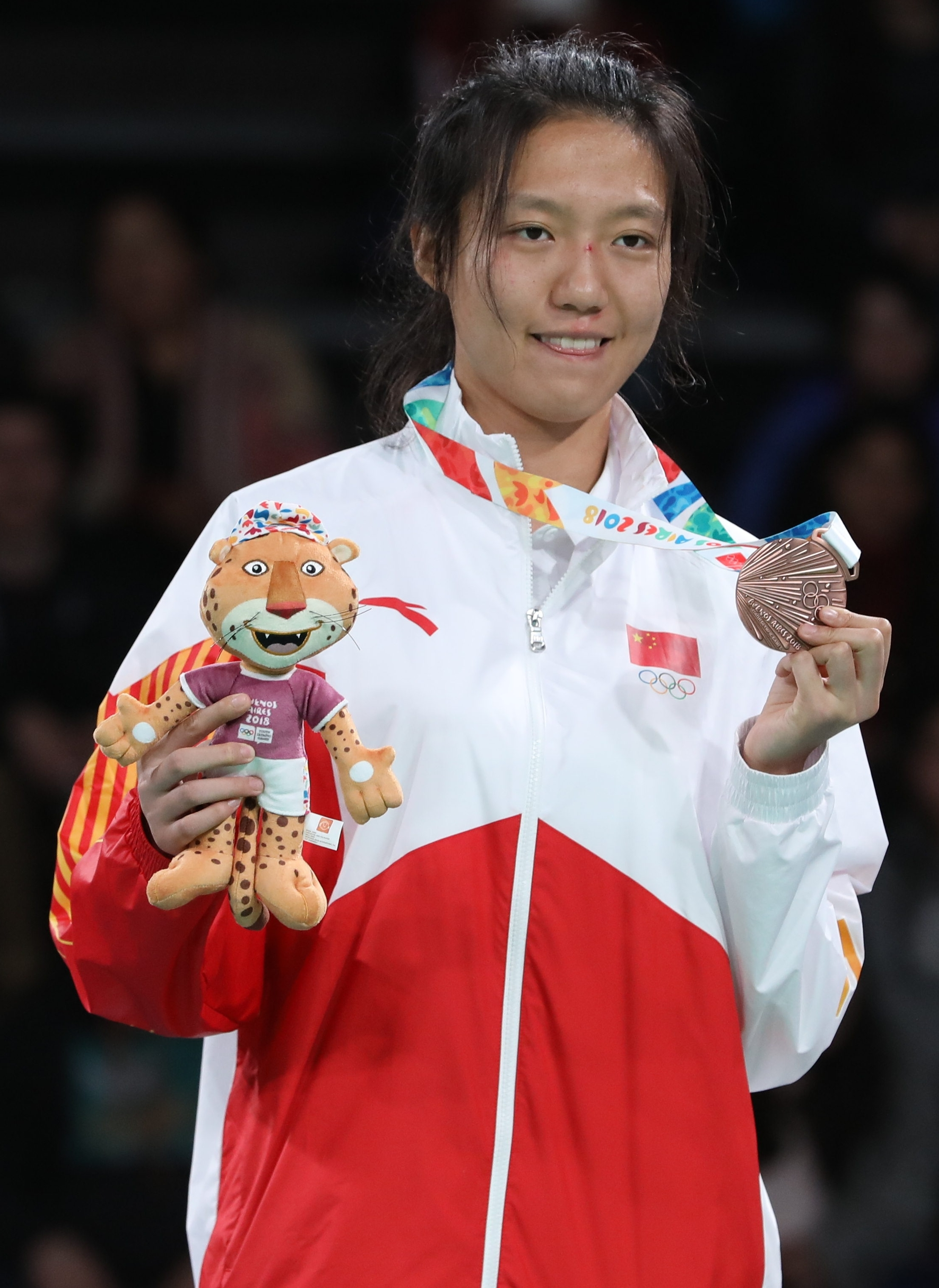
- Mu in 2018

Personal information
- Born: 4 December 2002 (age 23)

Sport
- Sport: Taekwondo
- Weight class: +73 kg
Medal record
Women's taekwondo
Representing China
World Championships
Bronze medal – third place	2025 Wuxi	+73 kg
World University Games
Gold medal – first place	2025 Rhine-Ruhr	Team
Youth Olympic Games
Bronze medal – third place	2018 Buenos Aires	+63 kg

Mu Wenzhe (born 4 December 2002) is a Chinese taekwondo practitioner. She was a bronze medalist at the 2025 World Taekwondo Championships.

== Career ==
She was a bronze medalist at the 2018 Summer Youth Olympics in Buenos Aires, Argentina, in the girls' +63 kg division.

She won a gold medal in the Team Kyorugi at the 2025 Summer World University Games in Germany alongside Xing Jiani and Guo Qing. She was a semi-finalist in the heavyweight division at the 2025 World Taekwondo Championships in Wuxi, China, and was defeated by Svetlana Osipova to win the bronze medal.
