= Xiangqi at the 2010 Asian Games – Men's individual =

Men's individual standard at the 2010 Asian Games
- Venue: Guangzhou Chess Institute
- Date: 13–19 November 2010
- Competitors: 18 from 10 nations

Medalists
gold medal	Hong Zhi	China
silver medal	Nguyễn Thành Bảo	Vietnam
bronze medal	Lü Qin	China

The competition of the men's individual standard Xiangqi took place at the Guangzhou Chess Institute between November 13 and November 19 at the 2010 Asian Games.

== Schedule ==
All times are China Standard Time (UTC+08:00)

Date	Time	Event
Saturday, 13 November 2010	14:30	Round 1
Sunday, 14 November 2010	14:30	Round 2
Monday, 15 November 2010	14:30	Round 3
Tuesday, 16 November 2010	14:30	Round 4
Wednesday, 17 November 2010	14:30	Round 5
Thursday, 18 November 2010	14:30	Round 6
Friday, 19 November 2010	14:30	Round 7

== Results ==
=== Round 1 ===
Red	Score	Black
Chan Chun Kit (HKG)	2–0	Sandy Chua (PHI)
Wu Kui-lin (TPE)	2–0	Lay Kam Hock (MAS)
Ma Chung-wei (TPE)	0–2	Hong Zhi (CHN)
Lại Lý Huynh (VIE)	2–0	Wong Wan Heng (MAS)
Jackson Hong (PHI)	2–0	Kuok U Long (MAC)
Nguyễn Thành Bảo (VIE)	2–0	Heng Chamnan (CAM)
Chiu Yu Kuen (HKG)	0–2	Lü Qin (CHN)
Lei Kam Fun (MAC)	2–0	Lay Chhay (CAM)
Alvin Woo (SIN)	2–0	Kazuharu Shoshi (JPN)

=== Round 2 ===
Red	Score	Black
Lü Qin (CHN)	1–1	Alvin Woo (SIN)
Hong Zhi (CHN)	2–0	Lei Kam Fun (MAC)
Jackson Hong (PHI)	0–2	Nguyễn Thành Bảo (VIE)
Lại Lý Huynh (VIE)	1–1	Wu Kui-lin (TPE)
Kazuharu Shoshi (JPN)	0–2	Chan Chun Kit (HKG)
Lay Chhay (CAM)	0–2	Chiu Yu Kuen (HKG)
Heng Chamnan (CAM)	0–2	Ma Chung-wei (TPE)
Wong Wan Heng (MAS)	2–0	Kuok U Long (MAC)
Sandy Chua (PHI)	0–2	Lay Kam Hock (MAS)

=== Round 3 ===
Red	Score	Black
Chan Chun Kit (HKG)	0–2	Hong Zhi (CHN)
Nguyễn Thành Bảo (VIE)	2–0	Lại Lý Huynh (VIE)
Wu Kui-lin (TPE)	1–1	Lü Qin (CHN)
Alvin Woo (SIN)	1–1	Jackson Hong (PHI)
Lay Kam Hock (MAS)	0–2	Wong Wan Heng (MAS)
Chiu Yu Kuen (HKG)	1–1	Ma Chung-wei (TPE)
Lei Kam Fun (MAC)	2–0	Sandy Chua (PHI)
Kuok U Long (MAC)	1–1	Heng Chamnan (CAM)
Lay Chhay (CAM)	1–1	Kazuharu Shoshi (JPN)

=== Round 4 ===
Red	Score	Black
Hong Zhi (CHN)	2–0	Nguyễn Thành Bảo (VIE)
Wong Wan Heng (MAS)	1–1	Alvin Woo (SIN)
Lü Qin (CHN)	2–0	Lei Kam Fun (MAC)
Chan Chun Kit (HKG)	0–2	Wu Kui-lin (TPE)
Ma Chung-wei (TPE)	2–0	Jackson Hong (PHI)
Lại Lý Huynh (VIE)	1–1	Chiu Yu Kuen (HKG)
Lay Kam Hock (MAS)	1–1	Lay Chhay (CAM)
Kazuharu Shoshi (JPN)	2–0	Kuok U Long (MAC)
Sandy Chua (PHI)	2–0	Heng Chamnan (CAM)

=== Round 5 ===
Red	Score	Black
Wu Kui-lin (TPE)	1–1	Hong Zhi (CHN)
Nguyễn Thành Bảo (VIE)	1–1	Lü Qin (CHN)
Alvin Woo (SIN)	2–0	Ma Chung-wei (TPE)
Chiu Yu Kuen (HKG)	2–0	Wong Wan Heng (MAS)
Lei Kam Fun (MAC)	1–1	Chan Chun Kit (HKG)
Jackson Hong (PHI)	0–2	Lại Lý Huynh (VIE)
Kazuharu Shoshi (JPN)	0–2	Lay Kam Hock (MAS)
Kuok U Long (MAC)	2–0	Sandy Chua (PHI)
Heng Chamnan (CAM)	0–2	Lay Chhay (CAM)

=== Round 6 ===
Red	Score	Black
Hong Zhi (CHN)	2–0	Alvin Woo (SIN)
Nguyễn Thành Bảo (VIE)	2–0	Wu Kui-lin (TPE)
Lü Qin (CHN)	1–1	Lại Lý Huynh (VIE)
Lay Kam Hock (MAS)	0–2	Chiu Yu Kuen (HKG)
Wong Wan Heng (MAS)	0–2	Lei Kam Fun (MAC)
Ma Chung-wei (TPE)	1–1	Chan Chun Kit (HKG)
Lay Chhay (CAM)	0–2	Kuok U Long (MAC)
Sandy Chua (PHI)	2–0	Kazuharu Shoshi (JPN)
Heng Chamnan (CAM)	2–0	Jackson Hong (PHI)

=== Round 7 ===
Red	Score	Black
Lü Qin (CHN)	2–0	Hong Zhi (CHN)
Chiu Yu Kuen (HKG)	0–2	Nguyễn Thành Bảo (VIE)
Lại Lý Huynh (VIE)	2–0	Lei Kam Fun (MAC)
Wu Kui-lin (TPE)	2–0	Alvin Woo (SIN)
Chan Chun Kit (HKG)	1–1	Lay Kam Hock (MAS)
Kuok U Long (MAC)	0–2	Ma Chung-wei (TPE)
Sandy Chua (PHI)	0–2	Wong Wan Heng (MAS)
Jackson Hong (PHI)	0–2	Lay Chhay (CAM)
Kazuharu Shoshi (JPN)	1–1	Heng Chamnan (CAM)

=== Summary ===
Rank	Athlete	Round							Total	BH
Rank	Athlete	1	2	3	4	5	6	7	Total	BH
1st place, gold medalist(s)	Hong Zhi (CHN)	2	2	2	2	1	2	0	11	59
2nd place, silver medalist(s)	Nguyễn Thành Bảo (VIE)	2	2	2	0	1	2	2	11	54
3rd place, bronze medalist(s)	Lü Qin (CHN)	2	1	1	2	1	1	2	10	62
4	Wu Kui-lin (TPE)	2	1	1	2	1	0	2	9	61
5	Lại Lý Huynh (VIE)	2	1	0	1	2	1	2	9	55
6	Chiu Yu Kuen (HKG)	0	2	1	1	2	2	0	8	57
7	Ma Chung-wei (TPE)	0	2	1	2	0	1	2	8	45
8	Lei Kam Fun (MAC)	2	0	2	0	1	2	0	7	54
9	Alvin Woo (SIN)	2	1	1	1	2	0	0	7	52
10	Chan Chun Kit (HKG)	2	2	0	0	1	1	1	7	49
11	Wong Wan Heng (MAS)	0	2	2	1	0	0	2	7	46
12	Lay Kam Hock (MAS)	0	2	0	1	2	0	1	6	45
13	Lay Chhay (CAM)	0	0	1	1	2	0	2	6	37
14	Kuok U Long (MAC)	0	0	1	0	2	2	0	5	36
15	Heng Chamnan (CAM)	0	0	1	0	0	2	1	4	41
16	Sandy Chua (PHI)	0	0	0	2	0	2	0	4	40
17	Kazuharu Shoshi (JPN)	0	0	1	2	0	0	1	4	39
18	Jackson Hong (PHI)	2	0	1	0	0	0	0	3	50
