= Zuo Wenjing =

Chinese xiangqi player

Personal information
- Native name: 左文静
- Nationality: Chinese
- Born: 6 November 1993 (age 32)
- Height: 1.3 m (4 ft 3 in)

Sport
- Country: China
- Sport: Xiangqi
- Rank: Women's Grandmaster (WGM)
- Turned pro: 2004

Achievements and titles
- World finals: Women's individual champion (2022)
Medal record
Women's xiangqi
Representing China
Asian Games
Gold medal – first place	2022 Hangzhou	Women's individual
Gold medal – first place	2022 Hangzhou	Mixed team
World Xiangqi Championship
Gold medal – first place	2022 Kuching	Women's individual

Zuo Wenjing (born 6 November 1993) is a Chinese xiangqi player. She won the women's individual title at the 2022 World Xiangqi Championship and, at the 2022 Asian Games, gold in both the women's individual and mixed team events.

== Early life ==
Zuo Wenjing was born on 6 November 1993. She has achondroplasia, diagnosed in early childhood, and is 1.3 m (4 ft 3 in) tall. In 2004 she was recruited by grandmaster Liu Dahua into the Hubei provincial team and became his disciple.

== Career ==
In 2006, aged 13, Zuo Wenjing won the national first-class player tournament in Beijing and became the youngest Chinese xiangqi master of the time.

She has been a leading competitor at the National Mind Sports Games, winning the women's team title and an individual rapid silver at the first Games in 2009, the women's youth individual title at the second Games in 2011 (with five wins and two draws), the women's rapid title at the third Games, an individual silver at the fourth Games, and the professional women's individual title at the fifth Games in 2023.

In October 2022 she won the women's individual event at the World Xiangqi Championship in Kuching, Malaysia, with a record of six wins and one draw, becoming world champion.

At the 2022 Asian Games in Hangzhou she won two gold medals: the mixed team event on 1 October, as a member of the Chinese team, and the women's individual event on 7 October, defeating Wang Linna in the final. Her coach is the grandmaster Hong Zhi, and in 2023 she joined the Shenzhen Chaoxiang women's team for the National Women's Xiangqi League.

== Personal life ==
A fan of the NBA player Kevin Garnett, Zuo plays basketball recreationally.
