= World Xiangqi Championship =

Board game competition

The World Xiangqi Championship is organised by the World Xiangqi Federation (WXF) and is held every two years since 1991. The inaugural edition took place in 1990 in Singapore.

== List of winners ==
#	Year	Location	Men's individual	Women individual	Non-Chinese
1	1990	Singapore	(China) Lü Qin	(Singapore) Teo Sim Hua	(United Kingdom) Winston Williams
2	1991	(China) Kunming	(China) Zhao Guorong	(China) Hu Ming	(United Kingdom) Winston Williams
3	1993	(China) Beijing	(China) Xu Tianhong	(China) Hu Ming	(Vietnam) Mai Thanh Minh
4	1995	Singapore	(China) Lü Qin	(Canada) Huang Yuying	(Vietnam) Vo Van Hoang Tung
5	1997	Hong Kong	(China) Lü Qin	(Italy) Lin Ye	(Vietnam) Mai Thanh Minh
					Non-Chinese/Non-Vietnamese
6	1999	(China) Shanghai	(China) Xu Yinchuan	(China) Jin Haiying	(Japan) Kazuharu Shoshi
7	2001	Macau	(China) Lü Qin	(China) Wang Linna (Chinese Taipei) Gao Yiping	(Hong Kong) Island Kon
8	2003	Hong Kong	(China) Xu Yinchuan	(China) Guo Liping	(Japan) Kazuharu Shoshi
9	2005	(France) Paris	(China) Lü Qin	(China) Guo Liping	(Hong Kong) Island Kon
10	2007	Macau	(China) Xu Yinchuan	(China) Wu Xia	(Japan) Kazuharu Shoshi
11	2009	(China) Xintai	(China) Zhao Xinxin	(China) You Yingqin	(Indonesia) Iwan Setiawan
12	2011	(Indonesia) Jakarta	(China) Jiang Chuan	(China) Tang Dan	(Hong Kong) Island Kon
13	2013	(China) Huizhou	(China) Wang Tianyi	(China) Tang Dan	(Thailand) Krishna Sankirtan
14	2015	(Germany) Munich	(China) Zheng Weitong	(China) Wang Linna	(Japan) Kazuharu Shoshi
15	2017	(Philippines) Manila	(China) Wang Tianyi	(China) Tang Dan	(Netherlands) Joep Nabuurs
16	2019	(Canada) Vancouver	(China) Xu Chao	(United States) Jia Dan	(Japan) Kazuharu Shoshi

#	Year	Location	Men's individual	Women's individual	Men's team	Women's team	Open rapid
17	2022	(Malaysia) Kuching	(China) Wang Tianyi	(China) Zuo Wenjing	Vietnam; Lai Ly Huynh; Nguyen Thanh Bao	no held	(Vietnam) Lai Ly Huynh
18	2023	(United States) Houston	(China) Meng Chen	(China) Tang Sinan	Singapore; Alvin Woo Tsung Han; Low Yi Hao	China; Tang Sinan; Liu Huan	(Vietnam) Lai Ly Huynh
19	2025	(China) Shanghai	(Vietnam) Lai Ly Huynh	(China) Tang Dan	China; Yin Sheng; Meng Fanrui	China; Tang Dan; Chen Lichun	(China) Yin Sheng

== See also ==
- List of world championships in mind sports
- World Mind Games
