= Lại Lý Huynh =

Vietnamese xiangqi grandmaster (born 1990)

Personal information
- Born: May 16, 1990 (age 36) Vĩnh Long, Vietnam
- Height: 1.60 m (5 ft 3 in)

Sport
- Country: Vietnam
- Sport: Xiangqi
- Rank: Grandmaster

Achievements and titles
- Highest world ranking: No. 43 (July 2021)
- Personal best: 2500 (January 2020, rating)
Medal record
Men's Xiangqi
Representing Vietnam
World Xiangqi Championship
Gold medal – first place	2025 Shanghai	Men's individual
Gold medal – first place	2022 Kuching	Open Rapid
Gold medal – first place	2022 Kuching	Men's team
Gold medal – first place	2023 Houston	Open Rapid
SEA Games
Gold medal – first place	2023 Phnom Penh	Men's standard single
Asian Games
Silver medal – second place	2022 Hangzhou	Mixed team
Bronze medal – third place	2022 Hangzhou	Men's individual

Lại Lý Huynh (born May 16, 1990) is a Vietnamese xiangqi grandmaster.

== Career ==
He is a Vietnamese Xiangqi Champion. In 2022, he won the World Rapid Xiangqi Championship.

In August 2023, he held a simultaneous exhibition in Nha Trang City, playing against 16 amateur players and finishing with 11 wins, 1 draw, and 4 losses.

In the 2023 World Xiangqi Championship, he reached the finals but lost the championship to Meng Chen in the tiebreaks. He won the Rapid portion of the championship, successfully defending his title.

In September 2025, he defeated Yin Sheng in the finals of the World Xiangqi Championship, becoming the first non-Chinese player in 30 years to win the championship.
