= Lü Qin =

Chinese xiangqi grandmaster (born 1962)

Personal information
- Born: 10 August 1962 (age 63) Huiyang, China

Sport
- Country: China
- Sport: Xiangqi
- Rank: Grandmaster

Achievements and titles
- Highest world ranking: No. 1 (January 2000)
- Personal best: 2675 (July 2000, rating)
Medal record
Men's Xiangqi
Representing China
Asian Games
Bronze medal – third place	2010 Guangzhou	Men's Individual

Lü Qin (Chinese: 吕钦; born 10 August 1962) is a Chinese xiangqi grandmaster who is one of the world's best players in Xiangqi (Chinese chess).

== Career ==
Lü Qin's major achievements in Xiangqi include the following:

- Winner of Chinese National Xiangqi Individual Championship in 1986, 1988, 1999, 2003 and 2004.
- Starter in the championship winning team of Guangdong in the Chinese National Xiangqi League in 1989, 1993, 1999, 2000, 2001, 2002, 2004 and 2006.
- Winner of Asian Xiangqi Individual Championship in 1985.
- Starter in the championship winning team of China in the World Xiangqi Championship in 1990, 1995, 1997, 2001 and 2005.
- Winner of the World Xiangqi Individual Championship in 1990, 1995, 1997, 2001 and 2005.

== Personal life ==
Lü Qin was born in Huiyang, Guangdong, China, in 1962. Lü belongs to the Hoklo dialect group. Lu is married to Xu Miaoling, another Xiangqi player on the Guangdong team.
