= Xiangqi at the 2010 Asian Games – Women's individual =

Women's individual standard at the 2010 Asian Games
- Venue: Guangzhou Chess Institute
- Date: 13–19 November 2010
- Competitors: 8 from 5 nations

Medalists
gold medal	Tang Dan	China
silver medal	Wang Linna	China
bronze medal	Gao Yi-ping	Chinese Taipei

The competition of the Women's individual standard Xiangqi took place at the Guangzhou Chess Institute between November 13 and November 19 at the 2010 Asian Games.

== Schedule ==
All times are China Standard Time (UTC+08:00)

Date	Time	Event
Saturday, 13 November 2010	14:30	Round 1
Sunday, 14 November 2010	14:30	Round 2
Monday, 15 November 2010	14:30	Round 3
Tuesday, 16 November 2010	14:30	Round 4
Wednesday, 17 November 2010	14:30	Round 5
Thursday, 18 November 2010	14:30	Round 6
Friday, 19 November 2010	14:30	Round 7

== Results ==
Legend

- BG — Sonneborn–Berger score

=== Round 1 ===
Red	Score	Black
Gao Yi-ping (TPE)	2–0	Lam Ka Yan (HKG)
Tang Dan (CHN)	2–0	Ngô Lan Hương (VIE)
Hoàng Thị Hải Bình (VIE)	0–2	Wang Linna (CHN)
Peng Jou-an (TPE)	2–0	Ayaka Ikeda (JPN)

=== Round 2 ===
Red	Score	Black
Lam Ka Yan (HKG)	2–0	Ayaka Ikeda (JPN)
Wang Linna (CHN)	2–0	Peng Jou-an (TPE)
Ngô Lan Hương (VIE)	2–0	Hoàng Thị Hải Bình (VIE)
Gao Yi-ping (TPE)	0–2	Tang Dan (CHN)

=== Round 3 ===
Red	Score	Black
Tang Dan (CHN)	2–0	Lam Ka Yan (HKG)
Hoàng Thị Hải Bình (VIE)	0–2	Gao Yi-ping (TPE)
Peng Jou-an (TPE)	0–2	Ngô Lan Hương (VIE)
Ayaka Ikeda (JPN)	0–2	Wang Linna (CHN)

=== Round 4 ===
Red	Score	Black
Lam Ka Yan (HKG)	0–2	Wang Linna (CHN)
Ngô Lan Hương (VIE)	2–0	Ayaka Ikeda (JPN)
Gao Yi-ping (TPE)	2–0	Peng Jou-an (TPE)
Tang Dan (CHN)	2–0	Hoàng Thị Hải Bình (VIE)

=== Round 5 ===
Red	Score	Black
Hoàng Thị Hải Bình (VIE)	1–1	Lam Ka Yan (HKG)
Peng Jou-an (TPE)	0–2	Tang Dan (CHN)
Ayaka Ikeda (JPN)	0–2	Gao Yi-ping (TPE)
Wang Linna (CHN)	2–0	Ngô Lan Hương (VIE)

=== Round 6 ===
Red	Score	Black
Lam Ka Yan (HKG)	0–2	Ngô Lan Hương (VIE)
Gao Yi-ping (TPE)	1–1	Wang Linna (CHN)
Tang Dan (CHN)	2–0	Ayaka Ikeda (JPN)
Hoàng Thị Hải Bình (VIE)	2–0	Peng Jou-an (TPE)

=== Round 7 ===
Red	Score	Black
Peng Jou-an (TPE)	0–2	Lam Ka Yan (HKG)
Ayaka Ikeda (JPN)	0–2	Hoàng Thị Hải Bình (VIE)
Wang Linna (CHN)	0–2	Tang Dan (CHN)
Ngô Lan Hương (VIE)	1–1	Gao Yi-ping (TPE)

=== Summary ===
Rank	Athlete	Round							Total	BG
Rank	Athlete	1	2	3	4	5	6	7	Total	BG
1st place, gold medalist(s)	Tang Dan (CHN)	2	2	2	2	2	2	2	14	42
2nd place, silver medalist(s)	Wang Linna (CHN)	2	2	2	2	2	1	0	11	26
3rd place, bronze medalist(s)	Gao Yi-ping (TPE)	2	0	2	2	2	1	1	10	22
4	Ngô Lan Hương (VIE)	0	2	2	2	0	2	1	9	17
5	Lam Ka Yan (HKG)	0	2	0	0	1	0	2	5	4.5
6	Hoàng Thị Hải Bình (VIE)	0	0	0	0	1	2	2	5	4.5
7	Peng Jou-an (TPE)	2	0	0	0	0	0	0	2	0
8	Ayaka Ikeda (JPN)	0	0	0	0	0	0	0	0	0
