= Xiangqi at the 2022 Asian Games – Mixed team =

Mixed team standard at the 2022 Asian Games
- Venue: Hangzhou Chess Academy
- Date: 28 September – 1 October 2023
- Competitors: 32 from 8 nations

Medalists
gold medal	China; Wang Yang, Zhao Xinxin, Zheng Weitong, Wang Linna, Zuo Wenjing
silver medal	Vietnam; Lại Lý Huynh, Nguyễn Minh Nhật Quang, Nguyễn Thành Bảo, Lê Thị Kim Loan, Nguyễn Hoàng Yến
bronze medal	Hong Kong; Chan Chun Kit, Tony Fung, Wong Hok Him, Lam Ka Yan

The mixed team competition at the 2022 Asian Games in Huangzhou was held from 28 September to 1 October 2023 at the Huangzhou Qi-Yuan Hall.

== Schedule ==
All times are China Standard Time (UTC+08:00)

Date	Time	Event
Thursday, 28 September 2023	14:00	Round 1
Friday, 29 September 2023	14:00	Round 2
Friday, 29 September 2023	19:00	Round 3
Saturday, 30 September 2023	14:00	Round 4
Sunday, 1 October 2023	14:00	Round 5
Sunday, 1 October 2023	19:00	Finals

== Results ==
=== Preliminary round ===
==== Round 1 ====
	Score	
Singapore	2–4	Vietnam
Alvin Woo	0–2	Lại Lý Huynh
Low Yi Hao	0–2	Nguyễn Thành Bảo
Ngô Lan Hương	2–0	Nguyễn Hoàng Yến
Macau	1–5	China
Sou Chon Hou	0–2	Zheng Weitong
Kam Kin Hei	0–2	Wang Yang
Li Kevin	1–1	Zuo Wenjing
Hong Kong	4–2	Chinese Taipei
Tony Fung	2–0	Liu Kuo-hua
Chan Chun Kit	2–0	Ge Jen-yi
Lam Ka Yan	0–2	Peng Jou-an
Thailand	0–6	Malaysia
Sarin Saengkiattiwong	0–2	Sim Yip How
Sura Sinthuyodsakun	0–2	Tan Yu Huat
Nattharinee Srivachirawat	0–2	Jee Xin Ru

==== Round 2 ====
	Score	
Malaysia	2–4	Hong Kong
Sim Yip How	1–1	Wong Hok Him
Tan Yu Huat	0–2	Tony Fung
Jee Xin Ru	1–1	Lam Ka Yan
Vietnam	1–5	China
Nguyễn Minh Nhật Quang	0–2	Wang Yang
Lại Lý Huynh	0–2	Zhao Xinxin
Nguyễn Hoàng Yến	1–1	Wang Linna
Chinese Taipei	6–0	Thailand
Chao Yi-fan	2–0	Sarin Saengkiattiwong
Liu Kuo-hua	2–0	Sura Sinthuyodsakun
Li Sih-yi	2–0	Nattharinee Srivachirawat
Singapore	6–0	Macau
Alvin Woo	2–0	Sou Chon Hou
Low Yi Hao	2–0	Kam Kin Hei
Ngô Lan Hương	2–0	Li Kevin

==== Round 3 ====
	Score	
China	5–1	Hong Kong
Zheng Weitong	1–1	Wong Hok Him
Wang Yang	2–0	Chan Chun Kit
Zuo Wenjing	2–0	Lam Ka Yan
Chinese Taipei	3–3	Singapore
Ge Jen-yi	1–1	Low Yi Hao
Chao Yi-fan	1–1	Alvin Woo
Peng Jou-an	1–1	Ngô Lan Hương
Vietnam	6–0	Malaysia
Nguyễn Thành Bảo	2–0	Tan Yu Huat
Lại Lý Huynh	2–0	Sim Yip How
Lê Thị Kim Loan	2–0	Jee Xin Ru
Thailand	1–5	Macau
Sura Sinthuyodsakun	1–1	Kam Kin Hei
Sarin Saengkiattiwong	0–2	Sou Chon Hou
Nattharinee Srivachirawat	0–2	Li Kevin

==== Round 4 ====
	Score	
China	6–0	Chinese Taipei
Wang Yang	2–0	Chao Yi-fan
Zhao Xinxin	2–0	Ge Jen-yi
Wang Linna	2–0	Peng Jou-an
Hong Kong	3–3	Vietnam
Tony Fung	1–1	Lại Lý Huynh
Wong Hok Him	1–1	Nguyễn Thành Bảo
Lam Ka Yan	1–1	Nguyễn Hoàng Yến
Singapore	6–0	Thailand
Low Yi Hao	2–0	Sura Sinthuyodsakun
Alvin Woo	2–0	Sarin Saengkiattiwong
Ngô Lan Hương	2–0	Nattharinee Srivachirawat
Macau	0–6	Malaysia
Sou Chon Hou	0–2	Sim Yip How
Kam Kin Hei	0–2	Tan Yu Huat
Li Kevin	0–2	Jee Xin Ru

==== Round 5 ====
	Score	
China	5–1	Singapore
Zhao Xinxin	1–1	Alvin Woo
Zheng Weitong	2–0	Low Yi Hao
Zuo Wenjing	2–0	Ngô Lan Hương
Vietnam	5–1	Macau
Nguyễn Thành Bảo	2–0	Sou Chon Hou
Nguyễn Minh Nhật Quang	1–1	Kam Kin Hei
Nguyễn Hoàng Yến	2–0	Li Kevin
Thailand	0–6	Hong Kong
Sura Sinthuyodsakun	0–2	Tony Fung
Sarin Saengkiattiwong	0–2	Chan Chun Kit
Nattharinee Srivachirawat	0–2	Lam Ka Yan
Malaysia	2–4	Chinese Taipei
Sim Yip How	2–0	Liu Kuo-hua
Tan Yu Huat	0–2	Chao Yi-fan
Jee Xin Ru	0–2	Peng Jou-an

==== Summary ====
Rank	Team	Round					Total	SOS	GP
Rank	Team	1	2	3	4	5	Total	SOS	GP
1	China (CHN)	2	2	2	2	2	10	26	26
2	Vietnam (VIE)	2	0	2	1	2	7	28	19
3	Hong Kong (HKG)	2	2	0	1	2	7	26	18
4	Chinese Taipei (TPE)	0	2	1	0	2	5	26	15
5	Singapore (SGP)	0	2	1	2	0	5	24	18
6	Malaysia (MAS)	2	0	0	2	0	4	21	16
7	Macau (MAC)	0	0	2	0	0	2	26	7
8	Thailand (THA)	0	0	0	0	0	0	23	1

=== Final round ===
==== Bronze medal match ====
	Score	
Hong Kong	3–3 (4–2)	Chinese Taipei
Tony Fung	2–0	Ge Jen-yi
Wong Hok Him	1–1	Chao Yi-fan
Lam Ka Yan	0–2	Peng Jou-an
Rapid matches
Tony Fung	0–2	Ge Jen-yi
Wong Hok Him	2–0	Chao Yi-fan
Lam Ka Yan	2–0	Peng Jou-an

==== Gold medal match ====
	Score	
China	6–0	Vietnam
Zhao Xinxin	2–0	Lại Lý Huynh
Wang Yang	2–0	Nguyễn Thành Bảo
Wang Linna	2–0	Nguyễn Hoàng Yến

== Non-participating athletes ==
- Fiona Tan (SGP)
