= Xiangqi at the 2022 Asian Games – Men's individual =

Men's individual standard at the 2022 Asian Games
- Venue: Hangzhou Chess Academy
- Date: 3–7 October 2023
- Competitors: 18 from 9 nations

Medalists
gold medal	Zheng Weitong	China
silver medal	Zhao Xinxin	China
bronze medal	Lại Lý Huynh	Vietnam

The competition of the men's individual standard Xiangqi took place at the Hangzhou Qiyuan (Zhili) Chess Hall between 3 October and 7 October 2023 at the 2022 Asian Games.

== Schedule ==
All times are China Standard Time (UTC+08:00)

Date	Time	Event
Tuesday, 3 October 2023	14:00	Round 1
Wednesday, 4 October 2023	14:00	Round 2
Wednesday, 4 October 2023	19:00	Round 3
Thursday, 5 October 2023	14:00	Round 4
Friday, 6 October 2023	14:00	Round 5
Friday, 6 October 2023	19:00	Round 6
Saturday, 7 October 2023	14:00	Round 7
Saturday, 7 October 2023	19:00	Final

== Results ==
=== Round 1 ===
Red	Score	Black
Radtai Lokutarapol (THA)	2–0	Kam Kin Hei (MAC)
Pairoj Panichkul (THA)	0–2	Tan Yu Huat (MAS)
Zhao Xinxin (CHN)	2–0	Ge Jen-yi (TPE)
Lại Lý Huynh (VIE)	1–1	Zheng Weitong (CHN)
Sok Theng (CAM)	0–2	Cheng Yin Lung (HKG)
Chheang Hong (CAM)	0–2	Low Yi Hao (SGP)
Sou Chon Hou (MAC)	1–1	Wong Hok Him (HKG)
Sim Yip How (MAS)	0–2	Liu Kuo-hua (TPE)
Alvin Woo (SGP)	0–2	Nguyễn Thành Bảo (VIE)

=== Round 2 ===
Red	Score	Black
Nguyễn Thành Bảo (VIE)	1–1	Zhao Xinxin (CHN)
Liu Kuo-hua (TPE)	2–0	Radtai Lokutarapol (THA)
Cheng Yin Lung (HKG)	0–2	Low Yi Hao (SGP)
Tan Yu Huat (MAS)	2–0	Sou Chon Hou (MAC)
Wong Hok Him (HKG)	0–2	Lại Lý Huynh (VIE)
Zheng Weitong (CHN)	2–0	Alvin Woo (SGP)
Ge Jen-yi (TPE)	1–1	Sim Yip How (MAS)
Kam Kin Hei (MAC)	2–0	Chheang Hong (CAM)
Pairoj Panichkul (THA)	2–0	Sok Theng (CAM)

=== Round 3 ===
Red	Score	Black
Low Yi Hao (SGP)	2–0	Tan Yu Huat (MAS)
Zhao Xinxin (CHN)	2–0	Liu Kuo-hua (TPE)
Lại Lý Huynh (VIE)	2–0	Nguyễn Thành Bảo (VIE)
Radtai Lokutarapol (THA)	0–2	Zheng Weitong (CHN)
Kam Kin Hei (MAC)	0–2	Pairoj Panichkul (THA)
Sou Chon Hou (MAC)	0–2	Cheng Yin Lung (HKG)
Sim Yip How (MAS)	1–1	Wong Hok Him (HKG)
Sok Theng (CAM)	0–2	Ge Jen-yi (TPE)
Chheang Hong (CAM)	0–2	Alvin Woo (SGP)

=== Round 4 ===
Red	Score	Black
Low Yi Hao (SGP)	1–1	Lại Lý Huynh (VIE)
Zheng Weitong (CHN)	1–1	Zhao Xinxin (CHN)
Liu Kuo-hua (TPE)	2–0	Pairoj Panichkul (THA)
Tan Yu Huat (MAS)	2–0	Cheng Yin Lung (HKG)
Nguyễn Thành Bảo (VIE)	2–0	Ge Jen-yi (TPE)
Alvin Woo (SGP)	2–0	Kam Kin Hei (MAC)
Wong Hok Him (HKG)	2–0	Radtai Lokutarapol (THA)
Sou Chon Hou (MAC)	1–1	Sim Yip How (MAS)
Sok Theng (CAM)	1–1	Chheang Hong (CAM)

=== Round 5 ===
Red	Score	Black
Zhao Xinxin (CHN)	2–0	Low Yi Hao (SGP)
Lại Lý Huynh (VIE)	2–0	Tan Yu Huat (MAS)
Liu Kuo-hua (TPE)	0–2	Zheng Weitong (CHN)
Cheng Yin Lung (HKG)	0–2	Nguyễn Thành Bảo (VIE)
Pairoj Panichkul (THA)	0–2	Wong Hok Him (HKG)
Ge Jen-yi (TPE)	0–2	Alvin Woo (SGP)
Sim Yip How (MAS)	2–0	Radtai Lokutarapol (THA)
Kam Kin Hei (MAC)	2–0	Sok Theng (CAM)
Chheang Hong (CAM)	2–0	Sou Chon Hou (MAC)

=== Round 6 ===
Red	Score	Black
Zhao Xinxin (CHN)	2–0	Lại Lý Huynh (VIE)
Zheng Weitong (CHN)	2–0	Nguyễn Thành Bảo (VIE)
Low Yi Hao (SGP)	1–1	Liu Kuo-hua (TPE)
Wong Hok Him (HKG)	2–0	Alvin Woo (SGP)
Tan Yu Huat (MAS)	0–2	Sim Yip How (MAS)
Cheng Yin Lung (HKG)	2–0	Pairoj Panichkul (THA)
Ge Jen-yi (TPE)	2–0	Kam Kin Hei (MAC)
Radtai Lokutarapol (THA)	0–2	Chheang Hong (CAM)
Sok Theng (CAM)	1–1	Sou Chon Hou (MAC)

Ranking after round 6

Rank	Athlete	Score	BH
1	Zhao Xinxin (CHN)	10	45
2	Zheng Weitong (CHN)	10	40
3	Lại Lý Huynh (VIE)	8	49
4	Low Yi Hao (SGP)	8	42
5	Wong Hok Him (HKG)	8	30
6	Nguyễn Thành Bảo (VIE)	7	45
7	Liu Kuo-hua (TPE)	7	41
8	Sim Yip How (MAS)	7	31
9	Alvin Woo (SGP)	6	39
10	Tan Yu Huat (MAS)	6	36
11	Cheng Yin Lung (HKG)	6	30
12	Ge Jen-yi (TPE)	5	36
13	Chheang Hong (CAM)	5	25
14	Pairoj Panichkul (THA)	4	33
15	Kam Kin Hei (MAC)	4	24
16	Sou Chon Hou (MAC)	3	34
17	Radtai Lokutarapol (THA)	2	41
18	Sok Theng (CAM)	2	27

=== Round 7 ===
Red	Score	Black
Low Yi Hao (SGP)	1–1	Wong Hok Him (HKG)
Lại Lý Huynh (VIE)	2–0	Liu Kuo-hua (TPE)
Nguyễn Thành Bảo (VIE)	1–1	Sim Yip How (MAS)
Alvin Woo (SGP)	1–1	Cheng Yin Lung (HKG)
Chheang Hong (CAM)	0–2	Tan Yu Huat (MAS)
Pairoj Panichkul (THA)	0–2	Ge Jen-yi (TPE)
Sou Chon Hou (MAC)	1–1	Kam Kin Hei (MAC)
Radtai Lokutarapol (THA)	2–0	Sok Theng (CAM)

=== Final ===
Red	Score	Black
Zheng Weitong (CHN)	2–0	Zhao Xinxin (CHN)

=== Summary ===
Rank	Athlete	Round							Total	BH	HH
Rank	Athlete	1	2	3	4	5	6	7	Total	BH	HH
1st place, gold medalist(s)	Zheng Weitong (CHN)	1	2	2	1	2	2	2	12		
2nd place, silver medalist(s)	Zhao Xinxin (CHN)	2	1	2	1	2	2	0	10		
3rd place, bronze medalist(s)	Lại Lý Huynh (VIE)	1	2	2	1	2	0	2	10	63	
4	Low Yi Hao (SGP)	2	2	2	1	0	1	1	9	56	
5	Wong Hok Him (HKG)	1	0	1	2	2	2	1	9	46	
6	Nguyễn Thành Bảo (VIE)	2	1	0	2	2	0	1	8	61	
7	Sim Yip How (MAS)	0	1	1	1	2	2	1	8	47	2
8	Tan Yu Huat (MAS)	2	2	0	2	0	0	2	8	47	0
9	Liu Kuo-hua (TPE)	2	2	0	2	0	1	0	7	57	
10	Alvin Woo (SGP)	0	0	2	2	2	0	1	7	53	
11	Ge Jen-yi (TPE)	0	1	2	0	0	2	2	7	44	
12	Cheng Yin Lung (HKG)	2	0	2	0	0	2	1	7	42	
13	Chheang Hong (CAM)	0	0	0	1	2	2	0	5	39	
14	Kam Kin Hei (MAC)	0	2	0	0	2	0	1	5	33	
15	Radtai Lokutarapol (THA)	2	0	0	0	0	0	2	4	48	
16	Pairoj Panichkul (THA)	0	2	2	0	0	0	0	4	45	
17	Sou Chon Hou (MAC)	1	0	0	1	0	1	1	4	44	
18	Sok Theng (CAM)	0	0	0	1	0	1	0	2	36	
