= Bạc Thị Khiêm =

Vietnamese Taekwondo

Personal information
- Nationality: Vietnam
- Born: Bạc Thị Khiêm; 14 August 2000 (age 26) Sơn La, Vietnam
- Occupation: Taekwondo athlete
- Years active: 2017–present

Medal record

Vận động viên Taekwondo chuyên nghiệp

Representing Vietnam

Asian Championships
Gold medal – first place	2024 Da Nang	67 kg

SEA Games
Gold medal – first place	2019 Philippines	individual sparring
Gold medal – first place	2022 Việt Nam	individual sparring
Gold medal – first place	2025 Thailand	individual sparring

Bạc Thị Khiêm (born 14 August 2000) is a Vietnamese taekwondo athlete. She is a member of the Vietnamese Taekwondo national team, with achievements including consecutive gold medals at the Southeast Asian Games, one at SEA Games 30, and another at SEA Games 31.

== Biography ==
Khiêm was born and raised in Mường Giôn commune (Quỳnh Nhai, Sơn La) and is the eldest child in her family. Her height of 1.75 m gave her an advantage and became a stepping stone to Taekwondo. Her talent was discovered at the age of 12. In 2015, Khiêm was called up to the national team and continued to establish herself at major competitions.

== Career ==
=== 2017 ===
In 2017, she was called up to the national team to participate in the 2017 Southeast Asian Youth Championship, where she won her first international gold medal.

=== 2022 ===
In 2022, she clinched the gold medal at the SEA Games 31 on home soil, successfully defending her title from the SEA Games 30 three years prior.

=== 2023 ===
At the 19th Asian Games, held in 2023, Khiêm lost to Song Jie in the semifinals and won the bronze medal.

=== 2024 ===
On 18 May 2024, Bac Thi Khiem won the gold medal in the women's 67 kg (148 lb) weight class at the 2024 Asian Taekwondo Championships held in Da Nang.

=== 2025 ===
Bạc Thị Khiêm won the 17th gold medal for the Vietnamese delegation at the SEA Games 33 in the women's 67–73 kg Taekwondo weight category.

== Achievements ==
=== Sports ===
Bac Thi Khiem's sporting achievements
Year	Tournament	Location	Achievement	Source
2017	Southeast Asian Taekwondo Championship	Uzbekistan	Gold medal	
2019	SEA Games 30	Philippines	Gold medal	
2022	SEA Games 31	Vietnam	Gold medal	
2024	Asian Championship	Vietnam	Gold medal	
2025	SEA Games 33	Thailand	Gold medal	
