= List of participating nations at the Asian Games =

This is a list of nations, as represented by National Olympic Committees (NOCs), that have participated in the Asian Games.

== List of nations ==
| 51 | In the table headings, indicates the Games year |
| • | Participated in the specified Games |
| H | Host nation for the specified Games |

=== Asian Games ===
| Nation | Code | 51 | 54 | 58 | 62 | 66 | 70 | 74 | 78 | 82 | 86 | 90 | 94 | 98 | 02 | 06 | 10 | 14 | 18 | 22 | 26 |
|---|---|---|---|---|---|---|---|---|---|---|---|---|---|---|---|---|---|---|---|---|---|
| Afghanistan | AFG | • | • | • | • | • | | • | | • | | • | • | | • | • | • | • | • | • | • |
| Bahrain | BRN | | | | | | | • | • | • | • | • | • | • | • | • | • | • | • | • | • |
| Bangladesh | BAN | | | | | | | | • | • | • | • | • | • | • | • | • | • | • | • | • |
| Bhutan | BHU | | | | | | | | | | • | • | • | • | • | • | • | • | • | • | • |
| Brunei | BRU | | | | | | | | | | | • | • | • | • | • | • | • | • | • | • |
| Cambodia | CAM | | • | • | • | | • | • | | | | | • | • | • | • | • | • | • | • | • |
| China | CHN | | | | | | | • | • | • | • | H | • | • | • | • | H | • | • | H | • |
| Chinese Taipei | TPE | | • | • | | • | • | | | | | • | • | • | • | • | • | • | • | • | • |
| Hong Kong | HKG | | • | • | • | • | • | • | • | • | • | • | • | • | • | • | • | • | • | • | • |
| India | IND | H | • | • | • | • | • | • | • | H | • | • | • | • | • | • | • | • | • | • | • |
| Indonesia | INA | • | • | • | H | • | • | • | • | • | • | • | • | • | • | • | • | • | H | • | • |
| Iran | IRI | • | | • | | • | • | H | | • | • | • | • | • | • | • | • | • | • | • | • |
| Iraq | IRQ | | | | | | | • | • | • | • | | | | | • | • | • | • | • | • |
| Israel | ISR | | • | • | | • | • | • | | | | | | | | | | | | | |
| Japan | JPN | • | • | H | • | • | • | • | • | • | • | • | H | • | • | • | • | • | • | • | H |
| Jordan | JOR | | | | | | | | | | • | | • | • | • | • | • | • | • | • | • |
| Kazakhstan | KAZ | | | | | | | | | | | | • | • | • | • | • | • | • | • | • |
| Kuwait | KUW | | | | | | | • | • | • | • | • | • | • | • | • | • | • | • | • | • |
| Kyrgyzstan | KGZ | | | | | | | | | | | | • | • | • | • | • | • | • | • | • |
| Laos | LAO | | | | | | | • | | • | | • | • | • | • | • | • | • | • | • | • |
| Lebanon | LBN | | | | | | | | • | • | • | • | • | • | • | • | • | • | • | • | • |
| Macau | MAC | | | | | | | | | | | • | • | • | • | • | • | • | • | • | • |
| Malaysia | MAS | | • | • | • | • | • | • | • | • | • | • | • | • | • | • | • | • | • | • | • |
| North Borneo | NBO | | • | • | • | | | | | | | | | | | | | | | | |
| Sarawak | SWK | | | | • | | | | | | | | | | | | | | | | |
| Maldives | MDV | | | | | | | | | • | • | • | • | • | • | • | • | • | • | • | • |
| Mongolia | MGL | | | | | | | • | • | • | | • | • | • | • | • | • | • | • | • | • |
| Myanmar | MYA | • | • | • | • | • | • | • | • | • | | • | • | • | • | • | • | • | • | • | • |
| Nepal | NEP | • | | • | | • | • | • | • | • | • | • | • | • | • | • | • | • | • | • | • |
| North Korea | PRK | | | | | | | • | • | • | | • | | • | • | • | • | • | • | • | • |
| Oman | OMA | | | | | | | | | • | • | • | • | • | • | • | • | • | • | • | • |
| Pakistan | PAK | | • | • | • | • | • | • | • | • | • | • | • | • | • | • | • | • | • | • | • |
| Palestine | PLE | | | | | | | | | | | • | • | • | • | • | • | • | • | • | • |
| Philippines | PHI | • | H | • | • | • | • | • | • | • | • | • | • | • | • | • | • | • | • | • | • |
| Qatar | QAT | | | | | | | | • | • | • | • | • | • | • | H | • | • | • | • | • |
| Saudi Arabia | KSA | | | | | | | | • | • | • | • | • | | • | • | • | • | • | • | • |
| Singapore | SGP | • | • | • | • | • | • | • | • | • | • | • | • | • | • | • | • | • | • | • | • |
| South Korea | KOR | | • | • | • | • | • | • | • | • | H | • | • | • | H | • | • | H | • | • | • |
| Sri Lanka | SRI | • | • | • | • | • | • | • | • | • | • | • | • | • | • | • | • | • | • | • | • |
| Syria | SYR | | | | | | | | • | • | | • | • | • | • | • | • | • | • | • | • |
| Tajikistan | TJK | | | | | | | | | | | | • | • | • | • | • | • | • | • | • |
| Thailand | THA | • | • | • | • | H | H | • | H | • | • | • | • | H | • | • | • | • | • | • | • |
| Timor-Leste | TLS | | | | | | | | | | | | | | • | • | • | • | • | • | • |
| Turkmenistan | TKM | | | | | | | | | | | | • | • | • | • | • | • | • | • | • |
| United Arab Emirates | UAE | | | | | | | | • | • | • | • | • | • | • | • | • | • | • | • | • |
| Uzbekistan | UZB | | | | | | | | | | | | • | • | • | • | • | • | • | • | • |
| Vietnam | VIE | | • | • | • | • | • | • | | • | | • | • | • | • | • | • | • | • | • | • |
| Yemen | YEM | | | | | | | | | | | • | • | • | • | • | • | • | • | • | • |
| North Yemen | YAR | | | | | | | | | • | • | | | | | | | | | | |
| South Yemen | YMD | | | | | | | | | • | | | | | | | | | | | |
| Asian Refugee Team | ART | | | | | | | | | | | | | | | | | | | | • |
| Independent Athletes | OCA | | | | | | | | | | | | | | | | | | | • | |
| Korea | COR | | | | | | | | | | | | | | | | | | • | | |
| Total | | 11 | 18 | 20 | 17 | 18 | 18 | 25 | 25 | 33 | 27 | 36 | 42 | 41 | 44 | 45 | 45 | 45 | 46 | 46 | 46 |
| References | | | | | | | | | | | | | | | | | | | | | |

=== Asian Winter Games ===
| Nation | Code | 86 | 90 | 96 | 99 | 03 | 07 | 11 | 17 | 25 |
|---|---|---|---|---|---|---|---|---|---|---|
| Afghanistan | AFG | | | | | | • | • | | • |
| Australia | AUS | | | | | | | | • | |
| Bahrain | BRN | | | | | | | • | | • |
| Cambodia | CAM | | | | | | | | | • |
| China | CHN | • | • | H | • | • | H | • | • | H |
| Chinese Taipei | TPE | | • | • | • | • | • | • | • | • |
| Hong Kong | HKG | • | | • | • | | • | • | • | • |
| India | IND | • | • | • | • | • | • | • | • | • |
| Indonesia | INA | | | | | | | | • | • |
| Iran | IRI | | • | • | • | • | • | • | • | • |
| Japan | JPN | H | H | • | • | H | • | • | H | • |
| Jordan | JOR | | | | | | • | • | • | • |
| Kazakhstan | KAZ | | | • | • | • | • | H | • | • |
| Kuwait | KUW | | | • | • | | • | • | • | • |
| Kyrgyzstan | KGZ | | | • | • | • | • | • | • | • |
| Lebanon | LBN | | | • | • | • | • | • | • | • |
| Macau | MAC | | | | | | • | | • | • |
| Malaysia | MAS | | | | | | • | • | • | • |
| Mongolia | MGL | • | • | • | • | • | • | • | • | • |
| Nepal | NEP | | | | | • | • | • | • | • |
| New Zealand | NZL | | | | | | | | • | |
| North Korea | PRK | • | • | | | • | • | • | • | • |
| Pakistan | PAK | | | • | • | • | • | | • | • |
| Palestine | PLE | | | | | • | • | • | | |
| Philippines | PHI | | • | | | | • | • | • | • |
| Qatar | QAT | | | | | | | • | • | • |
| Saudi Arabia | KSA | | | | | | | | | • |
| Singapore | SGP | | | | | | | • | • | • |
| South Korea | KOR | • | • | • | H | • | • | • | • | • |
| Sri Lanka | SRI | | | | | | | | • | • |
| Tajikistan | TJK | | | • | | • | • | • | • | • |
| Thailand | THA | | | | | • | • | • | • | • |
| Timor-Leste | TLS | | | | | | | | • | |
| Turkmenistan | TKM | | | | | | | | • | • |
| United Arab Emirates | UAE | | | | | | • | • | • | • |
| Uzbekistan | UZB | | | • | • | • | • | • | • | • |
| Vietnam | VIE | | | | | | | | • | • |
| Total | | 7 | 9 | 15 | 14 | 17 | 25 | 26 | 32 | 33 |
| References | | | | | | | | | | |

=== Asian Indoor and Martial Arts Games ===
| Nation | Code | 05 | 07 | 09 | 09 | 13 | 17 |
|---|---|---|---|---|---|---|---|
| Afghanistan | AFG | | • | • | • | • | • |
| American Samoa | ASA | | | | | | • |
| Australia | AUS | | | | | | • |
| Bahrain | BRN | • | • | • | • | • | • |
| Bangladesh | BAN | | • | • | • | • | • |
| Bhutan | BHU | | • | • | • | • | • |
| Brunei | BRU | | | • | • | • | • |
| Cambodia | CAM | • | • | • | • | • | • |
| China | CHN | • | • | • | • | • | • |
| Chinese Taipei | TPE | • | • | • | • | • | • |
| Cook Islands | COK | | | | | | • |
| Federated States of Micronesia | FSM | | | | | | • |
| Fiji | FIJ | | | | | | • |
| Guam | GUM | | | | | | • |
| Hong Kong | HKG | • | • | • | • | • | • |
| India | IND | • | • | • | • | • | • |
| Indonesia | INA | • | • | • | • | • | • |
| Iran | IRI | • | • | | • | • | • |
| Iraq | IRQ | • | • | • | • | • | • |
| Japan | JPN | • | • | • | • | • | • |
| Jordan | JOR | • | • | • | • | • | • |
| Kazakhstan | KAZ | • | • | • | • | • | • |
| Kiribati | KIR | | | | | | • |
| Kuwait | KUW | • | • | • | • | • | • |
| Kyrgyzstan | KGZ | • | • | | • | • | • |
| Laos | LAO | • | • | • | • | • | • |
| Lebanon | LBN | • | • | • | • | • | • |
| Macau | MAC | • | H | • | • | • | • |
| Malaysia | MAS | • | • | • | • | • | • |
| Maldives | MDV | • | • | • | • | • | • |
| Marshall Islands | MHL | | | | | | • |
| Mongolia | MGL | • | • | • | • | • | • |
| Myanmar | MYA | • | • | • | • | • | • |
| Nauru | NRU | | | | | | • |
| Nepal | NEP | • | • | • | • | • | • |
| New Caledonia | NCL | | | | | | • |
| North Korea | PRK | • | • | | • | | • |
| Oman | OMA | • | • | • | • | • | • |
| Pakistan | PAK | • | • | • | | • | • |
| Palau | PLW | | | | | | • |
| Palestine | PLE | | • | | | • | • |
| Papua New Guinea | PNG | | | | | | • |
| Philippines | PHI | • | • | • | • | • | • |
| Qatar | QAT | • | • | • | • | • | • |
| Samoa | SAM | | | | | | • |
| Saudi Arabia | KSA | | • | | • | • | • |
| Singapore | SGP | • | • | • | • | • | • |
| Solomon Islands | SOL | | | | | | • |
| South Korea | KOR | • | • | • | • | H | • |
| Sri Lanka | SRI | • | • | • | • | • | • |
| Syria | SYR | • | • | • | • | • | • |
| Tahiti | TAH | | | | | | • |
| Tajikistan | TJK | | • | | • | • | • |
| Thailand | THA | H | • | H | • | • | • |
| Timor-Leste | TLS | | • | | | | • |
| Tonga | TGA | | | | | | • |
| Turkmenistan | TKM | • | • | • | • | • | H |
| Tuvalu | TUV | | | | | | • |
| United Arab Emirates | UAE | • | • | | • | • | • |
| Uzbekistan | UZB | • | • | • | • | • | • |
| Vanuatu | VAN | | | | | | • |
| Vietnam | VIE | • | • | • | H | • | • |
| Yemen | YEM | • | • | • | • | • | • |
| Refugee Team | ART | | | | | | • |
| Total | | 37 | 44 | 37 | 42 | 43 | 64 |
| References | | | | | | | |

=== Asian Beach Games ===
| Nation | Code | 08 | 10 | 12 | 14 | 16 | 26 |
|---|---|---|---|---|---|---|---|
| Afghanistan | AFG | • | • | • | • | • | • |
| Bahrain | BRN | • | • | • | • | • | • |
| Bangladesh | BAN | • | • | • | • | • | • |
| Bhutan | BHU | | • | • | • | • | • |
| Brunei | BRU | • | • | • | • | • | • |
| Cambodia | CAM | • | • | • | • | • | • |
| China | CHN | • | • | H | • | • | H |
| Chinese Taipei | TPE | • | • | • | • | • | • |
| Hong Kong | HKG | • | • | • | • | • | • |
| India | IND | • | • | • | • | • | • |
| Indonesia | INA | H | • | • | • | • | • |
| Iran | IRI | • | • | • | • | • | • |
| Iraq | IRQ | | • | • | • | • | • |
| Japan | JPN | • | • | • | • | • | • |
| Jordan | JOR | • | • | • | • | • | • |
| Kazakhstan | KAZ | • | • | • | • | • | • |
| Kuwait | KUW | • | • | • | • | • | • |
| Kyrgyzstan | KGZ | • | • | • | • | • | • |
| Laos | LAO | • | • | • | • | • | • |
| Lebanon | LBN | • | • | • | • | • | • |
| Macau | MAC | • | | • | • | • | • |
| Malaysia | MAS | • | • | • | • | • | • |
| Maldives | MDV | • | • | • | • | • | • |
| Mongolia | MGL | • | • | • | • | • | • |
| Myanmar | MYA | • | • | | • | • | • |
| Nepal | NEP | • | • | • | • | • | • |
| North Korea | PRK | • | | | | | • |
| Oman | OMA | • | H | • | • | • | • |
| Pakistan | PAK | • | • | • | • | • | • |
| Palestine | PLE | • | • | • | | | • |
| Philippines | PHI | • | • | • | • | • | • |
| Qatar | QAT | • | • | • | • | • | • |
| Saudi Arabia | KSA | | • | • | | | • |
| Singapore | SGP | • | • | • | • | • | • |
| South Korea | KOR | • | • | • | • | • | • |
| Sri Lanka | SRI | • | • | • | • | • | • |
| Syria | SYR | • | • | • | • | • | • |
| Tajikistan | TJK | • | • | • | • | • | • |
| Thailand | THA | • | • | • | H | • | • |
| Timor-Leste | TLS | • | • | • | • | • | • |
| Turkmenistan | TKM | | • | • | • | • | • |
| United Arab Emirates | UAE | • | • | • | • | • | • |
| Uzbekistan | UZB | • | • | • | • | • | • |
| Vietnam | VIE | • | • | • | • | H | • |
| Yemen | YEM | • | • | • | • | | • |
| Total | | 41 | 43 | 43 | 42 | 41 | 45 |
| References | | | | | | | |

=== Asian Youth Games ===
| Nation | Code | 09 | 13 | 25 |
|---|---|---|---|---|
| Afghanistan | AFG | | • | • |
| Bahrain | BRN | • | • | H |
| Bangladesh | BAN | • | • | • |
| Bhutan | BHU | • | • | • |
| Brunei | BRU | • | • | • |
| Cambodia | CAM | • | • | • |
| China | CHN | • | H | • |
| Chinese Taipei | TPE | • | • | • |
| Hong Kong | HKG | • | • | • |
| India | IND | • | • | • |
| Indonesia | INA | • | • | • |
| Iran | IRI | • | • | • |
| Iraq | IRQ | • | • | • |
| Japan | JPN | • | • | • |
| Jordan | JOR | • | • | • |
| Kazakhstan | KAZ | • | • | • |
| Kuwait | KUW | • | • | • |
| Kyrgyzstan | KGZ | • | • | • |
| Laos | LAO | • | • | • |
| Lebanon | LBN | • | • | • |
| Macau | MAC | • | • | • |
| Malaysia | MAS | • | • | • |
| Maldives | MDV | • | • | • |
| Mongolia | MGL | • | • | • |
| Myanmar | MYA | • | • | • |
| Nepal | NEP | • | • | • |
| North Korea | PRK | • | • | • |
| Oman | OMA | • | • | • |
| Pakistan | PAK | • | • | • |
| Palestine | PLE | • | • | • |
| Philippines | PHI | • | • | • |
| Qatar | QAT | • | • | • |
| Saudi Arabia | KSA | • | • | • |
| Singapore | SGP | H | • | • |
| South Korea | KOR | • | • | • |
| Sri Lanka | SRI | • | • | • |
| Syria | SYR | • | • | • |
| Tajikistan | TJK | • | • | • |
| Thailand | THA | • | • | • |
| Timor-Leste | TLS | | • | • |
| Turkmenistan | TKM | • | • | • |
| United Arab Emirates | UAE | • | • | • |
| Uzbekistan | UZB | • | • | • |
| Vietnam | VIE | • | • | • |
| Yemen | YEM | • | • | • |
| Total | | 43 | 45 | 45 |
| References | | | | |

== Notes ==
- CAM: Cambodia was known as Khmer Republic (KHM) between 1970 and 1974.
- COR: A unified team of South Korea and North Korea competed under the title "Korea" in some sports at the 2018 Asian Games.
- IND: Athletes from India competed as Independent Olympic Athletes (AOI) at the 2013 Asian Indoor and Martial Arts Games and 2013 Asian Youth Games due to the suspension of the country's Olympic Committee. The Olympic flag was used in medal ceremonies.
- ISR: Israel was excluded from the Olympic Council of Asia in 1981 for political reasons and could no longer participate.
- KUW: Athletes from Kuwait competed as Athletes from Kuwait (IOC) at the 2010 Asian Games, 2010 Asian Beach Games and 2011 Asian Winter Games and as Independent Olympic Athletes (IOA) at the 2012 and 2016 Asian Beach Games, 2017 Asian Winter Games and 2017 Asian Indoor and Martial Arts Games due to the suspension of the country's Olympic Committee. The Olympic flag was used in medal ceremonies.
- MAS: Athletes from Malaya (MAL) and North Borneo (NBO) competed as independent teams at the 1954, 1958 and 1962 Games. and Sarawak (SWK) also competed at the 1962 Games, prior to the formation of the Federation of Malaysia in 1963.
- MYA: Myanmar was known as Burma (BIR) between 1951 and 1982.
- OCA: Independent Athletes competed at the 2022 Asian Games as neutrals under the Olympic Council of Asia flag, consist of the Sri Lanka national rugby sevens team whose federation was suspended by the World Rugby.
- SRI: Sri Lanka was known as Ceylon (CEY) between 1951 and 1970.
- TPE: Chinese Taipei was known as Republic of China (ROC) between 1954 and 1970.
- VIE: Vietnam first competed in the Asian Games in 1954 as State of Vietnam, after the Partition of Vietnam only South Vietnam (VNM) as the Republic of Vietnam competed from 1958 to 1974. Then after the reunification of Vietnam, they have competed under the Socialist Republic of Vietnam from 1982 onwards.
- YEM: Prior to Yemenite unification in 1990, North Yemen participated as the Yemen Arab Republic (YAR) in 1982 and 1986 and South Yemen participated as the Yemen Democratic Republic (YMD) in the 1982 Games.
