= Indoor athletics at the Asian Indoor and Martial Arts Games =

Indoor athletics has been contested at every Asian Indoor Games and Asian Indoor and Martial Arts Games since the inaugural games at the 2005 Asian Indoor Games, except the first combined games at the 2013 Asian Indoor and Martial Arts Games. The programme includes track and field events in 26 events (17 events each). The World Athletics and Asian Athletics Association are the world and continental respectively governing body.

== Editions ==
There are five Asian Indoor Games and Asian Indoor and Martial Arts Games that indoor athletics competed. The 2013 Asian Indoor and Martial Arts Games in Incheon, South Korea was only the games that excluded indoor athletics.

Games	Year	Host nation	Venue	Best nation	Ref.
I	2005	Thailand	Indoor Athletics Stadium, Pattaya	Kazakhstan	
II	2007	Macau	Macau East Asian Games Dome, Cotai	China	
III	2009	Vietnam	Hanoi Indoor Games Gymnasium, Hanoi	Kazakhstan	
V	2017	Turkmenistan	Ashgabat Indoor Athletics Arena, Ashgabat	Kazakhstan	
VI	Canceled	Thailand	Indoor Athletics Stadium, Pattaya		

== Events ==
=== Men's events ===
Current program
Event	05	07	09	17	21	Years
60 metres	X	X	X	X		4
400 metres	X	X	X	X		4
800 metres	X	X	X	X		4
1500 metres	X	X	X	X		4
3000 metres	X	X	X	X		4
60 metres hurdles	X	X	X	X		4
4 × 400 metres relay	X	X	X	X		4
High jump	X	X	X	X		4
Pole vault	X	X	X	X		4
Long jump	X	X	X	X		4
Triple jump	X	X	X	X		4
Shot put	X	X	X	X		4
Heptathlon	X	X	X	X		4
Total	13	13	13	13		

=== Women's events ===
Current program
Event	05	07	09	17	21	Years
60 metres	X	X	X	X		4
400 metres	X	X	X	X		4
800 metres	X	X	X	X		4
1500 metres	X	X	X	X		4
3000 metres	X	X	X	X		4
60 metres hurdles	X	X	X	X		4
4 × 400 metres relay	X	X	X	X		4
High jump	X	X	X	X		4
Long jump	X	X	X	X		4
Triple jump	X	X	X	X		4
Shot put	X	X	X	X		4
Heptathlon	X	X	X	X		4
Past events
Event	05	07	09	17	21	Years
Pole vault	X	X	X	–		3
Total	13	13	13	12		

== Nations ==
Nations	05	07	09	13	17	21	Years
Afghanistan (AFG)			X		5		2
American Samoa (ASA)					1		1
Athlete Refugee Team (ART)					5		1
China (CHN)	X	X	X		43		4
Chinese Taipei (TPE)	X	X	X		7		4
Cook Islands (COK)					1		1
Federated States of Micronesia (FSM)					2		1
Fiji (FIJ)					10		1
Guam (GUM)					2		1
Hong Kong (HKG)	X	X	X		11		4
India (IND)	X	X	X		11		4
Iran (IRI)	X	X	X		9		4
Iraq (IRQ)			X		2		2
Jordan (JOR)					22		1
Kazakhstan (KAZ)	X	X	X		14		4
Kiribati (KIR)					4		1
Kyrgyzstan (KGZ)		X	X		5		3
Lebanon (LBN)		X			2		1
Macau (MAC)	X	X	X		3		4
Maldives (MDV)	X	X	X		4		4
Marshall Islands (MHL)					2		1
Nauru (NRU)					2		1
Oman (OMA)	X	X	X		2		4
Pakistan (PAK)	X	X			11		3
Palau (PLW)					2		1
Palestine (PLE)					2		1
Philippines (PHI)					5		1
Qatar (QAT)	X	X	X		11		4
Samoa (SAM)					1		1
Saudi Arabia (KSA)		X	X		18		3
Solomon Islands (SOL)					3		1
South Korea (KOR)	X	X	X		10		4
Sri Lanka (SRI)		X	X		6		3
Syria (SYR)	X		X		1		3
Tajikistan (TJK)		X	X		8		3
Thailand (THA)	X	X	X		43		4
Turkmenistan (TKM)			X		35		2
Tuvalu (TUV)					2		1
United Arab Emirates (UAE)	X		X		3		3
Uzbekistan (UZB)		X	X		12		3
Vanuatu (VAN)					5		1
Vietnam (VIE)	X	X	X		7		4
Nations	16	20			42		
Track and field athletes							

== Medal table ==
Updated after the 2017 Asian Indoor and Martial Arts Games

Rank	Nation	Gold	Silver	Bronze	Total
1	Kazakhstan (KAZ)	25	15	15	55
2	China (CHN)	18	12	8	38
3	India (IND)	14	6	7	27
4	Thailand (THA)	9	24	28	61
5	Saudi Arabia (KSA)	9	6	2	17
6	Qatar (QAT)	9	4	6	19
7	Iran (IRI)	5	5	7	17
8	Uzbekistan (UZB)	3	4	1	8
9	Vietnam (VIE)	2	6	4	12
10	Hong Kong (HKG)	2	0	4	6
11	Kuwait (KUW)	1	5	1	7
12	Sri Lanka (SRI)	1	4	1	6
13	Bahrain (BRN)	1	3	1	5
14	Syria (SYR)	1	2	0	3
15	Pakistan (PAK)	1	1	1	3
16	Indonesia (INA)	1	0	1	2
16	United Arab Emirates (UAE)	1	0	1	2
18	South Korea (KOR)	0	2	3	5
19	Iraq (IRQ)	0	1	2	3
19	Kyrgyzstan (KGZ)	0	1	2	3
21	Chinese Taipei (TPE)	0	1	1	2
22	Philippines (PHI)	0	1	0	1
22	Singapore (SIN)	0	1	0	1
24	North Korea (PRK)	0	0	2	2
25	Macau (MAC)	0	0	1	1
25	Oman (OMA)	0	0	1	1
25	Turkmenistan (TKM)	0	0	1	1
Totals (27 entries)		103	104	101	308

== See also ==
- List of Asian Indoor and Martial Arts Games records in indoor athletics
- Asian Indoor Championships in Athletics
