= Wrestling at the Asian Games =

- Governing bodies: UWW (World) / UWWA (Asia)
- Events: 18 (men: 12; women: 6)

Games
- 1951; 1954; 1958; 1962; 1966; 1970; 1974; 1978; 1982; 1986; 1990; 1994; 1998; 2002; 2006; 2010; 2014; 2018; 2022; 2026
- Medalists

Wrestling has been an event at the Asian Games since 1954 in Manila, Philippines. Since the 1986 Asian Games Greco-Roman wrestling was included in the Games programme.

== Editions ==
Games	Year	Host city	Best nation
II	1954	Manila, Philippines	Japan
III	1958	Tokyo, Japan	Japan
IV	1962	Jakarta, Indonesia	Japan
V	1966	Bangkok, Thailand	Japan
VI	1970	Bangkok, Thailand	Iran
VII	1974	Tehran, Iran	Iran
VIII	1978	Bangkok, Thailand	Japan
IX	1982	New Delhi, India	Japan
X	1986	Seoul, South Korea	South Korea
XI	1990	Beijing, China	South Korea
XII	1994	Hiroshima, Japan	South Korea
XIII	1998	Bangkok, Thailand	South Korea
XIV	2002	Busan, South Korea	South Korea
XV	2006	Doha, Qatar	South Korea
XVI	2010	Guangzhou, China	Iran
XVII	2014	Incheon, South Korea	Iran
XVIII	2018	Jakarta–Palembang, Indonesia	Iran
XIX	2022	Hangzhou, China	Iran
XX	2026	Aichi–Nagoya, Japan	Japan

== Events ==
=== Men's freestyle ===
1954	1958	1962–1966	1970–1982	1986–1994	1998	2002–2010	2014	2018–2026
−52 kg			−48 kg		−54 kg	−55 kg	−57 kg	
−52 kg			48–52 kg		−54 kg	−55 kg	−57 kg	
52–57 kg					−54 kg	−55 kg	−57 kg	
52–57 kg					54–58 kg	−55 kg	−57 kg	
52–57 kg					54–58 kg	55–60 kg	−57 kg	
57–62 kg		57–63 kg	57–62 kg		54–58 kg	55–60 kg	57–61 kg	57–65 kg
57–62 kg		57–63 kg	57–62 kg		58–63 kg	55–60 kg	57–61 kg	57–65 kg
57–62 kg		57–63 kg	57–62 kg		58–63 kg	60–66 kg	57–61 kg	57–65 kg
57–62 kg		57–63 kg	57–62 kg		58–63 kg	60–66 kg	61–65 kg	57–65 kg
62–67 kg		57–63 kg	62–68 kg		58–63 kg	60–66 kg	61–65 kg	57–65 kg
62–67 kg		63–70 kg	62–68 kg		63–69 kg	60–66 kg	61–65 kg	57–65 kg
62–67 kg		63–70 kg	62–68 kg		63–69 kg	60–66 kg	65–70 kg	65–74 kg
62–67 kg		63–70 kg	62–68 kg		63–69 kg	66–74 kg	65–70 kg	65–74 kg
67–73 kg		63–70 kg	62–68 kg		63–69 kg	66–74 kg	65–70 kg	65–74 kg
67–73 kg		63–70 kg	68–74 kg		63–69 kg	66–74 kg	65–70 kg	65–74 kg
67–73 kg		63–70 kg	68–74 kg		69–76 kg	66–74 kg	65–70 kg	65–74 kg
67–73 kg		70–78 kg	68–74 kg		69–76 kg	66–74 kg	70–74 kg	65–74 kg
73–79 kg		70–78 kg	68–74 kg		69–76 kg	66–74 kg	70–74 kg	65–74 kg
73–79 kg		70–78 kg	74–82 kg		69–76 kg	74–84 kg	74–86 kg	
73–79 kg		70–78 kg	74–82 kg		76–85 kg	74–84 kg	74–86 kg	
73–79 kg		78–87 kg	74–82 kg		76–85 kg	74–84 kg	74–86 kg	
	79–87 kg	78–87 kg	74–82 kg		76–85 kg	74–84 kg	74–86 kg	
	79–87 kg	78–87 kg	82–90 kg		76–85 kg	74–84 kg	74–86 kg	
	79–87 kg	78–87 kg	82–90 kg		76–85 kg	84–96 kg	74–86 kg	
	79–87 kg	78–87 kg	82–90 kg		85–97 kg	84–96 kg	74–86 kg	
	79–87 kg	78–87 kg	82–90 kg		85–97 kg	84–96 kg	86–97 kg	
+87 kg		87–97 kg	82–90 kg		85–97 kg	84–96 kg	86–97 kg	
+87 kg		87–97 kg	90–100 kg		85–97 kg	84–96 kg	86–97 kg	
+87 kg		87–97 kg	90–100 kg		85–97 kg	96–120 kg	86–97 kg	
+87 kg		+97 kg	90–100 kg		97–130 kg	96–120 kg	97–125 kg	
+87 kg		+97 kg	+100 kg	100–130 kg	97–130 kg	96–120 kg	97–125 kg	
7	8	8	10	10	8	7	8	6

=== Women's freestyle ===
2002–2010	2014	2018–2026
−48 kg		−50 kg
48–55 kg		−50 kg
48–55 kg		50–53 kg
48–55 kg		53–57 kg
55–63 kg		53–57 kg
55–63 kg		57–62 kg
55–63 kg		62–68 kg
63–72 kg	63–75 kg	62–68 kg
63–72 kg	63–75 kg	68–76 kg
4	4	6

== Medal table ==
Rank	Nation	Gold	Silver	Bronze	Total
1	Iran (IRI)	80	44	38	162
2	Japan (JPN)	79	58	54	191
3	South Korea (KOR)	54	28	61	143
4	Uzbekistan (UZB)	14	17	21	52
5	India (IND)	13	17	41	71
6	Mongolia (MGL)	12	19	36	67
7	China (CHN)	11	27	35	73
8	Kazakhstan (KAZ)	11	22	33	66
9	North Korea (PRK)	8	18	16	42
10	Pakistan (PAK)	6	14	14	34
11	Kyrgyzstan (KGZ)	6	12	28	46
12	Bahrain (BRN)	1	0	1	2
13	Tajikistan (TJK)	0	4	4	8
14	Syria (SYR)	0	3	4	7
15	Iraq (IRQ)	0	2	3	5
16	Afghanistan (AFG)	0	2	2	4
16	Philippines (PHI)	0	2	2	4
18	Vietnam (VIE)	0	1	1	2
19	Jordan (JOR)	0	1	0	1
19	Lebanon (LBN)	0	1	0	1
21	Turkmenistan (TKM)	0	0	3	3
22	Indonesia (INA)	0	0	2	2
22	Qatar (QAT)	0	0	2	2
Totals (23 entries)		295	292	401	988

== Participating nations ==
Nation	54	58	62	66	70	74	78	82	86	90	94	98	02	06	10	14	18	22	26	Years
Afghanistan	1	6	7	X		6		10		X	X		8	4	4		6	3	2	14
Bahrain																	1	4	5	
Bangladesh							X	3			X		2				3		2	
Cambodia														4	4	4	5	14	5	
China						3	X	4	X	X	X	10	14	16	17	18	18	18	18	14
Chinese Taipei	4									X	X	2	2	3		2	6	5	4	10
Hong Kong																			2	1
India	5		7	X	10	14	X	10	X	X	X	6	16	18	17	18	18	18	15	18
Indonesia			13		2			5	X		X				4	2	18	6	5	
Iran		8		8	10	19		10	20	20	20	16	14	14	14	14	12	12	12	16
Iraq						12	X	5	X					11	6	5			2	8
Japan	7	8	12	8	10	18	10	10	X	X	X	16	17	14	18	18	18	18	18	19
Jordan													2	2	2	4				
Kazakhstan											X	16	13	18	18	18	17	18	18	9
Kuwait																		1		
Kyrgyzstan											X	12	13	18	17	15	13	15	14	9
Laos																4		1		
Lebanon										X		3	1	3	2		1		1	
Malaysia		2																		
Mongolia						10	X	5		X	X	9	11	11	11	12	12	12	15	13
Myanmar																6				
Nepal												3		1	1	2	3	4	6	
North Korea						5	X	9		X		7	6	8	9	9	8	8	8	12
North Yemen								4												
Pakistan	5	8	8	8	9	7	X	4	X	X	X	2	2	3	3	4	4	4	4	19
Palestine													2	3	2	2	2	1	1	
Philippines	6	6	6	X		7		4			X	6	8	7	4	2	2	3	7	
Qatar													11	8	3	4	2		2	
Saudi Arabia								10	X					4		3			3	
Singapore																		3		
South Korea	3	6	5	X	7	12	X	9	X	X	X	16	17	18	18	18	18	18	18	19
Sri Lanka	1		1		3		X	2		X						1	1	1	5	
Syria							X	5		X	X	10	7	10	8	5	2	2	1	12
Tajikistan													6	5	8	11	9	9	9	
Thailand				X	10		X					14		1	5	5	12	11	4	
Timor-Leste																			1	1
Turkmenistan											X	3	7	8	11	12	10	9	6	9
United Arab Emirates														2	2					
Uzbekistan											X	16	12	14	15	15	15	18	18	9
Vietnam										X	X	6	3	8	7	3	9	10	7	
Yemen										X		2	2		3	3	4	1		
Number of nations	32	44	59	61	61	113	70	109				175	196	236	233	239	249	247	238	
Number of athletes	8	7	8	10	8	11	12	17				20	24	28	28	30	29	29	32	
