= Chess at the Asian Games =

Sport at the Asian Games

- Governing bodies: FIDE (World) / ACF (Asia)
- Events: 4 (men: 2; women: 2)

Games
- 1951; 1954; 1958; 1962; 1966; 1970; 1974; 1978; 1982; 1986; 1990; 1994; 1998; 2002; 2006; 2010; 2014; 2018; 2022; 2026
- Medalists

Chess became a medal sport at the 2006 Asian Games. Chess was not held in 2014 and 2018 Asian Games but in 2019, during Olympic Council of Asia's General Assembly it was decided the return of the sport in the 2022 Asian Games, which was held in Hangzhou, China.

== Editions ==
Games	Year	Host city	Best nation
XV	2006	Doha, Qatar	India
XVI	2010	Guangzhou, China	China
XIX	2022	Hangzhou, China	China

== Events ==
Event	06	10	22	Years
Men's individual rapid	X	X	X	3
Men's team standard		X	X	2
Women's individual rapid	X	X	X	3
Women's team standard		X	X	2
Mixed team standard	X			1
Total	3	4	4	

== Medal table ==
Rank	Nation	Gold	Silver	Bronze	Total
1	China (CHN)	6	3	3	12
2	India (IND)	2	2	2	6
3	Uzbekistan (UZB)	1	3	2	6
4	Iran (IRI)	1	0	1	2
4	Kazakhstan (KAZ)	1	0	1	2
6	Vietnam (VIE)	0	2	1	3
7	Philippines (PHI)	0	1	0	1
8	Qatar (QAT)	0	0	1	1
Totals (8 entries)		11	11	11	33

== Participating nations ==
Nation	06	10	22	Years
Bahrain	3			1
Bangladesh	3	10	5	3
China	3	10	8	3
Chinese Taipei			2	1
Hong Kong			10	1
India	3	10	10	3
Indonesia	3	2	7	3
Iran	3	10	6	3
Iraq		6		1
Japan	3	3	2	3
Jordan	3	10		2
Kazakhstan	3	7	10	3
Kuwait			2	1
Kyrgyzstan		5	5	2
Laos		1		1
Lebanon		3		1
Macau	3			1
Malaysia		3		1
Maldives		6		1
Mongolia	3	6	10	3
Nepal	3	4		2
Palestine	3			1
Philippines	3	5	9	3
Qatar	3	9	3	3
Singapore			1	1
South Korea		10	10	2
Sri Lanka	3		1	2
Syria	3	4		2
Thailand			8	1
Turkmenistan	3	5		2
United Arab Emirates	3	4	5	3
Uzbekistan	3	8	10	3
Vietnam	3	10	10	3
Yemen		5		1
Number of nations	21	25	21	
Number of athletes	63	156	134	
