= Asian Indoor Games =

Defunct multi-sport event

- Official logo of the Games
- Abbreviation: AIG
- Frequency: Every two years
- Inaugurated: 2005 Asian Indoor Games in Bangkok, Thailand
- Most recent: 2009 Asian Indoor Games in Hanoi, Vietnam

The Asian Indoor Games were a multi-sport event that was contested every two years among athletes representing countries from Asia. The games were regulated by the Olympic Council of Asia. The first games were held in 2005 in Bangkok, Thailand.

The competition consisted of indoor sports with TV broadcasting potential, a number of which are not included in the Asian Games and Winter Asian Games Programs and are not Olympic sports. The sports program included electronic sports, extreme sports, aerobics, acrobatics, indoor athletics, dance sports, futsal, inline hockey, finswimming, and 25 metres short course swimming. The 2007 Asian Indoor Games in Macau also saw the first major test of FIBA 3x3, a formalized version of three-on-three basketball that saw its official worldwide debut at the 2010 Youth Olympics. FIBA 3x3 was also contested in the 2009 Games.

Doha was given the rights to hold the fourth edition scheduled for 2011, but a year later, in June 2008, the Qatar Olympic Committee officially withdrew as host citing "unforeseen circumstances". In response, the OCA said that the 2009 Asian Indoor Games would be the last edition of the games. The Asian Indoor Games and Asian Martial Arts Games would then combine, becoming the quadrennial Asian Indoor and Martial Arts Games. The inaugural event was held in Incheon, South Korea in 2013.

== Host Cities ==
Host cities of the Asian Indoor Games

Edition	Year	Host city	Host nation	Opened by	Start Date	End Date	Nations	Competitors	Sports	Events	Top Placed Team	Ref.
I	2005	Bangkok	Thailand	Crown Prince Vajiralongkorn	12 November	19 November	37	2,343	9	120	China (CHN)	
II	2007	Macau	Macau	Chief Executive Edmund Ho	26 October	3 November	44	1,792	17	151	China (CHN)	
III	2009	Hanoi	Vietnam	President Nguyễn Minh Triết	30 October	8 November	42	2,456	24	215	China (CHN)	

== Medal count ==
Rank	Nation	Gold	Silver	Bronze	Total
1	China (CHN)	124	69	58	251
2	Thailand (THA)	58	66	89	213
3	Kazakhstan (KAZ)	53	51	40	144
4	Vietnam (VIE)	44	36	34	114
5	Hong Kong (HKG)	33	27	33	93
6	South Korea (KOR)	31	35	39	105
7	Iran (IRI)	24	24	24	72
8	India (IND)	22	21	43	86
9	Japan (JPN)	19	18	26	63
10	Uzbekistan (UZB)	13	18	21	52
11	Chinese Taipei (TPE)	12	12	24	48
12	Indonesia (INA)	9	4	20	33
13	Qatar (QAT)	8	8	6	22
14	Macau (MAC)	7	13	13	33
15	Saudi Arabia (KSA)	7	4	2	13
16	United Arab Emirates (UAE)	5	0	4	9
17	Malaysia (MAS)	4	8	14	26
18	Laos (LAO)	3	13	19	35
19	Philippines (PHI)	3	6	10	19
20	Singapore (SIN)	2	15	12	29
21	Jordan (JOR)	2	5	7	14
22	Kuwait (KUW)	1	6	9	16
23	Cambodia (CAM)	1	4	7	12
24	Bahrain (BRN)	1	3	1	5
25	Iraq (IRQ)	0	5	8	13
26	Mongolia (MGL)	0	3	9	12
27	Sri Lanka (SRI)	0	3	2	5
28	Afghanistan (AFG)	0	2	2	4
29	Pakistan (PAK)	0	2	1	3
29	Syria (SYR)	0	2	1	3
31	Myanmar (MYA)	0	2	0	2
32	Brunei (BRU)	0	1	6	7
33	Kyrgyzstan (KGZ)	0	1	2	3
34	Tajikistan (TJK)	0	1	0	1
35	Lebanon (LIB)	0	0	3	3
36	Bangladesh (BAN)	0	0	2	2
36	North Korea (PRK)	0	0	2	2
38	Oman (OMA)	0	0	1	1
Totals (38 entries)		486	488	594	1,568

== Sports ==
- 3x3 basketball
- Aerobic gymnastics
- Archery
- Athletics
- BMX freestyle
- Board games
  - Chess
  - Xiangqi
- Bowling
- Boxing
- Cue sports
- Cycling
- Dancesport
- Dragon and lion dance
- Esports
- Finswimming
- Futsal
- Indoor hockey
- Kabaddi
- Kickboxing
- Kurash
- Muaythai
- Pencak silat
- Pétanque
- Roller sports
  - Roller freestyle
  - Skateboarding
- Sepak takraw
- Sport climbing
- Short course swimming
- Shuttlecock
- Vovinam
- Wushu
