= Taekwondo at the Asian Games =

- Governing bodies: WT (World) / ATU (Asia)
- Events: 11 (men: 5; women: 5; mixed: 1)

Games
- 1951; 1954; 1958; 1962; 1966; 1970; 1974; 1978; 1982; 1986; 1990; 1994; 1998; 2002; 2006; 2010; 2014; 2018; 2022; 2026
- Medalists

Taekwondo events have been contested at every Asian Games since 1986 Games in Seoul, South Korea.

== Editions ==
Games	Year	Host city	Best nation
X	1986	Seoul, South Korea	South Korea
XII	1994	Hiroshima, Japan	South Korea
XIII	1998	Bangkok, Thailand	South Korea
XIV	2002	Busan, South Korea	South Korea
XV	2006	Doha, Qatar	South Korea
XVI	2010	Guangzhou, China	South Korea
XVII	2014	Incheon, South Korea	South Korea
XVIII	2018	Jakarta–Palembang, Indonesia	South Korea
XIX	2022	Hangzhou, China	South Korea
XX	2026	Aichi–Nagoya, Japan	South Korea

== Medal table ==
Rank	Nation	Gold	Silver	Bronze	Total
1	South Korea (KOR)	66	18	14	98
2	Iran (IRI)	16	18	24	58
3	China (CHN)	16	15	22	53
4	Chinese Taipei (TPE)	12	13	22	47
5	Thailand (THA)	8	12	24	44
6	Jordan (JOR)	4	13	15	32
7	Uzbekistan (UZB)	4	11	11	26
8	Vietnam (VIE)	2	10	16	28
9	Philippines (PHI)	1	7	26	34
10	Indonesia (INA)	1	6	8	15
11	Kazakhstan (KAZ)	1	3	18	22
12	Kuwait (KUW)	1	0	6	7
13	Qatar (QAT)	1	0	4	5
14	Cambodia (CAM)	1	0	0	1
15	Japan (JPN)	0	4	12	16
16	Malaysia (MAS)	0	2	7	9
17	Nepal (NEP)	0	1	13	14
18	Afghanistan (AFG)	0	1	5	6
19	Lebanon (LBN)	0	0	4	4
19	Tajikistan (TJK)	0	0	4	4
21	Saudi Arabia (KSA)	0	0	3	3
22	Bahrain (BRN)	0	0	2	2
22	Macau (MAC)	0	0	2	2
22	Singapore (SGP)	0	0	2	2
25	India (IND)	0	0	1	1
25	Iraq (IRQ)	0	0	1	1
25	Mongolia (MGL)	0	0	1	1
25	Yemen (YEM)	0	0	1	1
Totals (28 entries)		134	134	268	536
