= Boxing at the Asian Games =

- Governing bodies: WB (World) / AB (Asia)
- Events: 11 (men: 6; women: 5)

Games
- 1951; 1954; 1958; 1962; 1966; 1970; 1974; 1978; 1982; 1986; 1990; 1994; 1998; 2002; 2006; 2010; 2014; 2018; 2022; 2026
- Medalists

Boxing has been contested at every Asian Games since its introduction to the program at the 1954 Asian Games.

== Editions ==
Games	Year	Host city	Best nation
II	1954	Manila, Philippines	Philippines
III	1958	Tokyo, Japan	Japan
IV	1962	Jakarta, Indonesia	South Korea
V	1966	Bangkok, Thailand	South Korea
VI	1970	Bangkok, Thailand	South Korea
VII	1974	Tehran, Iran	South Korea
VIII	1978	Bangkok, Thailand	South Korea
IX	1982	New Delhi, India	South Korea
X	1986	Seoul, South Korea	South Korea
XI	1990	Beijing, China	South Korea
XII	1994	Hiroshima, Japan	Philippines
XIII	1998	Bangkok, Thailand	Thailand
XIV	2002	Busan, South Korea	Uzbekistan
XV	2006	Doha, Qatar	Uzbekistan
XVI	2010	Guangzhou, China	China
XVII	2014	Incheon, South Korea	Kazakhstan
XVIII	2018	Jakarta–Palembang, Indonesia	Uzbekistan
XIX	2022	Hangzhou, China	China
XX	2026	Aichi–Nagoya, Japan	India

== Events ==
The boxing competition is organized as a set of tournaments, one for each weight class. The number of weight classes has changed over the years, and the definition of each class has changed several times, as shown in the following table.

Men's weight classes
1954	1958–1962	1966–1978	1982–2002	2006	2010–2014	2018	2022	2026
Flyweight −51 kg		Light flyweight −48 kg			Light flyweight −49 kg		Flyweight −51 kg	Bantamweight –55 kg
Flyweight −51 kg		Flyweight; 48–51 kg			Flyweight; 49–52 kg		Flyweight −51 kg	Bantamweight –55 kg
Bantamweight; 51–54 kg					Bantamweight; 52–56 kg		Featherweight; 51–57 kg	Bantamweight –55 kg
Featherweight; 54–57 kg					Lightweight; 56–60 kg		Featherweight; 51–57 kg	Lightweight; 55–60 kg
Lightweight; 57–60 kg					Lightweight; 56–60 kg		Light welterweight 57–63.5 kg	Lightweight; 55–60 kg
Light welterweight 60–63.5 kg				Light welterweight 60–64 kg			Light welterweight 57–63.5 kg	Light middleweight 60–70 kg
Welterweight; 63.5–67 kg				Welterweight; 64–69 kg			Light middleweight 63.5–71 kg	Light middleweight 60–70 kg
Light middleweight 67–71 kg				Welterweight; 64–69 kg			Light middleweight 63.5–71 kg	Light middleweight 60–70 kg
	Middleweight; 71–75 kg			Middleweight; 69–75 kg			Light heavyweight 71–80 kg	Light heavyweight 70–80 kg
	Middleweight; 75–81 kg						Light heavyweight 71–80 kg	Light heavyweight 70–80 kg
	Heavyweight +81 kg		Heavyweight; 81–91 kg				Heavyweight; 80–92 kg	Heavyweight; 80–90 kg
	Heavyweight +81 kg		Super heavyweight +91 kg				Super heavyweight +92 kg	Super heavyweight +90 kg
7	10	11	12	11	10	7	7	6

Women's weight classes
2010–2014	2018	2022	2026
Flyweight −51 kg		Light flyweight −50 kg	Flyweight −51 kg
Lightweight; 51–60 kg	Featherweight; 51–57 kg	Bantamweight; 50–54 kg	Bantamweight; 51–54 kg
Lightweight; 51–60 kg	Featherweight; 51–57 kg	Featherweight; 54–57 kg	Lightweight; 54–60 kg
Lightweight; 51–60 kg	Lightweight; 57–60 kg		Lightweight; 54–60 kg
Middleweight; 60–75 kg		Welterweight; 60–66 kg	Welterweight; 60–65 kg
Middleweight; 60–75 kg		Middleweight; 66–75 kg	Middleweight; 65–75 kg
3	3	6	5

== Medal table ==
Rank	Nation	Gold	Silver	Bronze	Total
1	South Korea (KOR)	59	27	31	117
2	Uzbekistan (UZB)	24	13	19	56
3	Thailand (THA)	21	26	35	82
4	Kazakhstan (KAZ)	18	15	18	51
5	China (CHN)	17	17	18	52
6	Japan (JPN)	15	14	42	71
7	Philippines (PHI)	15	12	31	58
8	India (IND)	12	17	38	67
9	North Korea (PRK)	8	10	11	29
10	Pakistan (PAK)	6	19	36	61
11	Iran (IRI)	5	11	27	43
12	Indonesia (INA)	3	8	15	26
13	Chinese Taipei (TPE)	3	4	5	12
14	Mongolia (MGL)	2	6	17	25
15	Syria (SYR)	2	1	8	11
16	Tajikistan (TJK)	2	0	6	8
17	Myanmar (MYA)	1	4	7	12
18	Jordan (JOR)	0	2	5	7
19	Cambodia (CAM)	0	2	1	3
20	Vietnam (VIE)	0	1	5	6
21	Iraq (IRQ)	0	1	4	5
21	Sri Lanka (SRI)	0	1	4	5
23	Saudi Arabia (KSA)	0	1	1	2
23	Singapore (SGP)	0	1	1	2
25	Nepal (NEP)	0	0	6	6
26	Kyrgyzstan (KGZ)	0	0	4	4
26	Malaysia (MAS)	0	0	4	4
26	Turkmenistan (TKM)	0	0	4	4
29	Kuwait (KUW)	0	0	3	3
30	Bangladesh (BAN)	0	0	1	1
30	Laos (LAO)	0	0	1	1
30	Palestine (PLE)	0	0	1	1
30	Qatar (QAT)	0	0	1	1
Totals (33 entries)		213	213	410	836
