= Doha Asian Games =

Doha Asian Games may refer to two different Asian Games held in Doha:

- 2006 Asian Games
- 2030 Asian Games, future event
