= Timor-Leste at the Asian Games =

- IOC code: TLS
- NOC: National Olympic Committee of Timor Leste
- Medals: Gold 0 Silver 0 Bronze 0 Total 0

Summer appearances
- 2002; 2006; 2010; 2014; 2018; 2022; 2026

Timor-Leste first competed at the Asian Games in 2002.

== Asian Games ==
=== Medals by Asian Games ===
Ranking are based on Total Overall Medal

Games	Athletes	Gold	Silver	Bronze	Total	Rank
(South Korea) 2002 Busan	15	0	0	0	0	–
(Qatar) 2006 Doha	15	0	0	0	0	–
(China) 2010 Guangzhou	23	0	0	0	0	–
(South Korea) 2014 Incheon	33	0	0	0	0	–
(Indonesia) 2018 Jakarta / Palembang	69	0	0	0	0	–
(China) 2022 Hangzhou	23	0	0	0	0	–
(Japan) 2026 Nagoya	future event					
(Qatar) 2030 Doha	future event					
(Saudi Arabia) 2034 Riyadh	future event					
Total	155	0	0	0	0	–

== Asian Winter Games ==
=== Medals by Asian Winter Games ===
Ranking are based on Total Overall Medal

Games	Athletes	Gold	Silver	Bronze	Total	Rank
(Japan) 2017 Sapporo–Obihiro	1	0	0	0	0	–
(China) 2025 Harbin	did not participate					
(Saudi Arabia) 2029 Neom	future event					
Total	1	0	0	0	0	–

== Asian Para Games ==
=== Medals by Asian Para Games ===
Ranking are based on Total Overall Medal

Games	Athletes	Gold	Silver	Bronze	Total	Rank
(China) 2010 Guangzhou	12	0	0	0	0	0
(South Korea) 2014 Incheon	6	0	0	0	0	0
(Indonesia) 2018 Jakarta	19	2	0	1	3	20
(China) 2022 Hangzhou	10	0	1	0	1	25
Total	47	2	1	1	4	25

== Asian Beach Games ==
East Timorese athletes have consistently participated in every edition of the Asian Beach Games, debuting in 2008.

=== Medals by Games ===
Games	Athletes	Gold	Silver	Bronze	Total	Rank
(Indonesia) 2008 Bali	18	0	0	0	0	–
(Oman) 2010 Muscat	8	0	0	0	0	–
(China) 2012 Haiyang	6	0	0	0	0	–
(Thailand) 2014 Phuket	4	0	0	0	0	–
(Vietnam) 2016 Danang	4	0	0	0	0	–
Total	40	0	0	0	0	–

== Asian Indoor and Martial Arts Games ==
=== Medals by Games ===
Games	Athletes	Gold	Silver	Bronze	Total	Rank
Asian Indoor Games
2007 Macau	15	0	0	0	0	–
(Vietnam) 2009 Hanoi	did not participate					
Asian Martial Arts Games
(Thailand) 2009 Bangkok	did not participate					
Asian Indoor and Martial Arts Games
(South Korea) 2013 Incheon	did not participate					
(Turkmenistan) 2017 Ashgabat	1	0	0	0	0	–
(Thailand) 2021 Bangkok–Chonburi	cancelled					
Total	16	0	0	0	0	–
