= All-time Asian Games medal table =

Below is the all time medal table for Summer Asian Games from 1951 to 2026. This does not include the medals won at the Asian Winter Games and other events hosted by the Olympic Council of Asia (OCA).

== Games ==
Number	Events	Gold	Silver	Bronze	Total
1 – 1951	57	57	57	55	169
2 – 1954	77	77	77	75	229
3 – 1958	112	112	112	126	350
4 – 1962	120	120	122	130	372
5 – 1966	140	140	140	170	450
6 – 1970	135	137	133	153	423
7 – 1974	200	202	199	208	609
8 – 1978	199	201	199	226	626
9 – 1982	196	199	200	215	614
10 – 1986	269	270	268	310	848
11 – 1990	308	310	309	357	976
12 – 1994	338	339	337	403	1,079
13 – 1998	377	378	380	467	1,225
14 – 2002	419	427	421	502	1,350
15 – 2006	424	428	423	542	1,393
16 – 2010	476	477	479	621	1,577
17 – 2014	439	439	445	575	1,459
18 – 2018	465	464	465	622	1,551
19 – 2022	481	482	480	631	1,593
20 – 2026	469	470	469	629	1,568
Total		5,729	5,715	7,017	18,461

== Medals ==
Updated after the 2022 Asian Games.

=== NOCs with medals ===
Team (IOC code)	№ Games	Gold	Silver	Bronze	Total
Afghanistan (AFG)	8	0	6	12	18
Bahrain (BRN)	8	49	28	28	105
Bangladesh (BAN)	10	1	5	8	14
Brunei (BRU)	5	0	1	5	6
Cambodia (CAM)	4	3	2	5	10
China (CHN)	13	1,674	1,105	791	3,570
Chinese Taipei (TPE)	13	118	164	304	586
Hong Kong (HKG)	16	46	96	141	283
India (IND)	19	183	238	357	778
Indonesia (INA)	19	98	130	264	492
Iran (IRI)	16	192	202	217	611
Iraq (IRQ)	9	7	17	26	50
Israel (ISR)	5	18	16	19	53
Japan (JPN)	19	1,084	1,104	1,054	3,242
Jordan (JOR)	9	5	21	28	54
Kazakhstan (KAZ)	8	165	180	292	637
Korea (COR)	1	1	1	2	4
Kuwait (KUW)	11	29	34	38	101
Kyrgyzstan (KGZ)	8	8	25	47	80
Laos (LAO)	8	0	4	14	18
Lebanon (LBN)	9	5	5	9	19
Macau (MAC)	9	3	14	22	39
Malaysia (MAS)	17	69	109	166	344
Mongolia (MGL)	12	28	51	104	183
Myanmar (MYA)	17	17	28	57	102
Nepal (NEP)	10	0	3	23	26
North Korea (PRK)	11	120	162	189	471
Oman (OMA)	6	1	1	4	6
Pakistan (PAK)	18	44	64	99	207
Palestine (PLE)	9	0	0	2	2
Philippines (PHI)	19	71	116	241	428
Qatar (QAT)	11	48	37	59	144
Saudi Arabia (KSA)	10	29	15	27	71
Singapore (SGP)	19	44	65	123	232
South Korea (KOR)	18	787	722	916	2,425
Sri Lanka (SRI)	16	12	13	26	51
Syria (SYR)	10	9	8	16	33
Tajikistan (TJK)	7	6	8	21	35
Thailand (THA)	19	144	189	311	644
Turkmenistan (TKM)	7	3	9	18	30
United Arab Emirates (UAE)	8	12	22	27	61
Uzbekistan (UZB)	8	105	138	171	414
Vietnam (VIE)	15	21	75	112	208
Yemen (YEM)	3	0	0	2	2
Totals	19	5,259	5,232	6,396	16,887

=== NOCs without medals ===
Team (IOC code)	№ Games
Maldives (MDV)	11
Bhutan (BHU)	10
Timor-Leste (TLS)	6
North Borneo (NBO)	3
North Yemen (YAR)	2
Sarawak (SWK)	1
South Yemen (YMD)	1

== Ranked medal table ==
Updated after the 2026 Asian Games.

Rank	Nation	Gold	Silver	Bronze	Total
1	China (CHN)	1,843	1,194	874	3,911
2	Japan (JPN)	1,167	1,199	1,145	3,511
3	South Korea (KOR)	826	765	984	2,575
4	Iran (IRI)	211	220	232	663
5	India (IND)	204	265	394	863
6	Kazakhstan (KAZ)	177	204	340	721
7	Thailand (THA)	162	202	332	696
8	North Korea (PRK)	127	165	208	500
9	Uzbekistan (UZB)	126	163	195	484
10	Chinese Taipei (TPE)	123	181	337	641
11	Indonesia (INA)	103	141	287	531
12	Malaysia (MAS)	78	116	182	376
13	Philippines (PHI)	75	125	257	457
14	Bahrain (BRN)	60	33	34	127
15	Hong Kong (HKG)	57	107	165	329
16	Qatar (QAT)	54	43	65	162
17	Singapore (SGP)	46	74	130	250
18	Pakistan (PAK)	44	66	107	217
19	Kuwait (KUW)	33	35	42	110
20	Saudi Arabia (KSA)	33	18	37	88
21	Mongolia (MGL)	29	52	117	198
22	Vietnam (VIE)	24	78	131	233
23	Myanmar (MYA)	19	29	59	107
24	United Arab Emirates (UAE)	19	27	28	74
25	Israel (ISR)	18	16	19	53
26	Sri Lanka (SRI)	13	14	28	55
27	Kyrgyzstan (KGZ)	9	28	57	94
28	Syria (SYR)	9	8	16	33
29	Tajikistan (TJK)	8	13	30	51
30	Jordan (JOR)	7	24	34	65
31	Iraq (IRQ)	7	19	29	55
32	Lebanon (LBN)	5	6	11	22
33	Macau (MAC)	4	18	23	45
34	Turkmenistan (TKM)	3	11	18	32
35	Cambodia (CAM)	3	2	10	15
36	Bangladesh (BAN)	1	5	9	15
37	Oman (OMA)	1	2	5	8
38	Korea (COR)	1	1	2	4
39	Afghanistan (AFG)	0	6	13	19
40	Laos (LAO)	0	4	15	19
41	Nepal (NEP)	0	3	25	28
42	Brunei (BRU)	0	1	6	7
43	Palestine (PLE)	0	0	2	2
43	Yemen (YEM)	0	0	2	2
Totals (44 entries)		5,729	5,683	7,036	18,448

== See also ==
- All-time Asian Para Games medal table
- All-time Asian Winter Games medal table
