= Bhutan at the Asian Games =

- IOC code: BHU
- NOC: Bhutan Olympic Committee
- Medals: Gold 0 Silver 0 Bronze 0 Total 0

Summer appearances
- 1986; 1990; 1994; 1998; 2002; 2006; 2010; 2014; 2018; 2022; 2026

Bhutan is a member of South Asian Zone of the Olympic Council of Asia, and participating in the Asian Games since the Beijing 1990 Games. Bhutan is yet to make its debut at the Asian Winter Games. Bhutan Olympic Committee, established in 1983, and recognized in 1984, is the National Olympic Committee for Bhutan. It is also yet to obtain its first medal.
