= 2021 Asian Indoor and Martial Arts Games =

Multi-sport event in Thailand

- Host city: Bangkok and Chonburi, Thailand
- Motto: Garland of hope
- Events: 359 (+6) in 36 (+2) sports
- Opening: 21 November 2024 (cancelled)
- Closing: 30 November 2024 (cancelled)
- Main venue: Bangkok Arena

The 2021 Asian Indoor and Martial Arts Games, officially known as the 6th Asian Indoor and Martial Arts Games and also known as Bangkok–Chonburi 2021, was a planned pan-Asian multi-sport event in indoor and martial arts sports that was supposed to be held from 21 to 30 November 2024 in Thailand, with its capital Bangkok and the eastern Thai province of Chonburi serving as joint co-hosts.

The Olympic Council of Asia (OCA) officially awarded the Games to Bangkok and Chonburi Province and signed the hosting rights contract in April 2020. Originally scheduled to take place from 21 to 30 May 2021, the event was postponed four times due to various occasions. It was pushed back twice as a result of the COVID-19 pandemic, first rescheduled to be held from 10 to 20 March 2022, and then from 17 to 26 November 2023. However, the event was postponed again due to political uncertainty in the country following the Thai general election; the Games were then timetabled for 24 February to 6 March 2024, but were rescheduled once more citing its five-month proximity to the 2024 Summer Olympics in Paris.

On 19 August 2024, the Games were cancelled after organizers failed to meet contractual obligations. However, the OCA Executive Board also agreed that Thailand can apply to host the next games after the 2025 edition.

This was supposed to be the first AIMAG (and the third OCA-sanctioned event after the 2011 Asian Winter Games in Astana and Almaty, Kazakhstan and the 2018 Asian Games in Jakarta and Palembang, Indonesia) to be jointly co-hosted by two cities or regions; it would have also been Bangkok's third time to host the event after staging the first Asian Indoor Games in 2005 and the only iteration of the Asian Martial Arts Games in 2009 (both Games were eventually merged in 2013). This edition of the AIMAG would have marked the debuts for badminton, baseball5, BMX cycling, cheerleading, floorball, indoor rowing, netball, shooting and volleyball, and would have seen a record-high number of sports in the event's history, at a total of 30.

== Bidding process ==
On November 28, National Olympic Committee of Thailand (NOCT) President Yuthasak Sasiprapha initially expressed possible of Thai's Asian Indoor and Martial Arts Games bid in 2021 to OCA Director General Husain A.H.Z. Al-Musallam during 2015 ANOC General Assembly in the United States. On 17 October 2017, OCA President Ahmed Al-Fahad Al-Ahmed Al-Sabah met Thai government officials to offer Thailand hosting Asian Indoor and Martial Arts Games in 2021 while Deputy Prime Minister Thanasak Patimaprakorn also interested this offer and mulled over Pattaya to host this games, but Federation of National Sport Association (FONSA) President Intarat Yodbangtoey suggested that Thai government should bargain OCA to host the 2030 Asian Games if Thailand receive the hosting rights for the 2021 AIMAG.

During the 2019 OCA General Assembly in Bangkok, Thailand had expressed interest to bid for four major sporting events between 2021 and 2030, namely the 2021 Asian Indoor and Martial Arts Games, the Asian Youth Games in 2025, the Summer Youth Olympics in 2026, and the 2030 Asian Games. The OCA chose Bangkok and Chonburi on 27 April 2020 in a virtual meeting, and the host city contract is signed that same day.

== Development and preparation ==
The cabinet resolution was released on March 17, 2020. It reported the negotiations with the Olympic Council of Asia and the budget allocation for the Games. The Olympic Council of Asia reduced a cost of marketing right from ~US$2 million to ~US$500 thousand. It distributed a broadcasting right to two parts that one is a local broadcasting right for the host country and the other one is an international broadcasting right shared the Organizing Committee with 50 percent. It also allowed Bangkok and Chonburi Province to host the Games as joint host cities.

A budget allocation for the Games had been reported to be ฿1.4855 billion (~US$48 million), including ฿50 million (~US$1.6 million) from a broadcasting right, ฿100 million (~US$3.2 million) from a marketing agent, ฿87.5 million (~US$2.8 million) from a registration fee, ฿2.5 million (~US$80 thousand) from revenue of the Games, and ฿1.2455 billion (~US$40 million) from the government. It also suggested the Organizing Committee to provide more budget for Coronavirus disease 2019 prevention management by Ministry of Tourism and Sports and Ministry of Public Health.

On 20 May 2020, the Olympic Council of Asia announced that Dato Seri Chaipak Siriwat was appointed as a vice president of the Olympic Council of Asia from the host country representative to work closely with the Olympic Council of Asia in the successful execution of the 6th Asian Indoor and Martial Art Games. The OCA Coordination Committee, permanent committee not depending on any Games, will be responsible for the conduct of the five different Games organised by the Olympic Council of Asia. It is headed by Randhir Singh elected for the period 2019 to 2023, during the 38th OCA General Assembly held in Bangkok. The full composition of the Coordination Committee is as follows:

Coordination Committee of the Olympic Council of Asia
Executive Board members (5)	Other members (10)
(India) Randhir Singh (chair); (China) Wei Jizhong; (Kuwait) Husain AHZ Al-Musallam; (Oman) Taha Al Kishry; (South Korea) Moon Dae-sung	(China) Zhang Jilong; (India) Vinod Kumar Tiwari; (Iran) Nasrollah Sadjadi; (Japan) Yuko Arakida; (Kuwait) Haider AHE Farman; (Pakistan) Mohammad Tayyab Ikram; (Malaysia) Mani Jegathesan; (Qatar) Abdulla Yousef Al-Mulla; (Qatar) Dahlan Juman Ahmad; (Australia) James Tomkins (Oceania Represent)

The meeting of the preparation of the 6th Asian Indoor and Martial Art Games was held on June 15, 2020. Chaipak Siriwat, vice president of the Olympic Council of Asia, informed officially about competition programme confirmed by the Olympic Council of Asia. It was confirmed that the Games will be held between 21 and 30 May, including consideration of the events in the twenty-nine sports and two demonstration sports proposed by the Organizing Committee. Fourteen sports complexes were also confirmed, including eight in Bangkok and six in Chonburi.

The meeting proposed to launch the Public Health Commission encouraged by Department of Health and Ministry of Public Health. It recommended Coronavirus disease 2019 preventive measures in two ways depended on whether the pandemic is over or not. One is to allow athletes and officials quarantining for fourteen days, before the curtain will rise on the Games.

=== Venues ===
Bangkok and surrounding

Five sport events would have been held at the SAT Sports Complex, which were some of the main venues of the 1966, 1970, 1978, and 1998 Asian Games, the 2005 Asian Indoor Games, the 2007 Summer Universiade, and the 2009 Asian Martial Arts Games.

- Extreme Sport Arena – BMX cycling, roller sports
- Indoor Stadium Huamark – futsal (men's group stage and quarter-finals)
- Rajamangala Stadium – sport climbing
- Shooting Range – shooting

Three sport events will be held at the National Stadium and Chulalongkorn University, which were some of the main venues of the 1966, 1970, 1978, and 1998 Asian Games, the 2005 Asian Indoor Games, the 2007 Summer Universiade, and the 2009 Asian Martial Arts Games.

- Chaloem Rajasuda Sport Complex – 3x3 basketball
- Chantana Yingyong Stadium – netball
- Nimibutr Stadium – badminton

Two sport events will be held at the Bangkok Youth Center (Thai-Japan), which were some of the main venues of the 1998 Asian Games, the 2005 Asian Indoor Games, the 2007 Summer Universiade, and the 2009 Asian Martial Arts Games.

- Gymnasium 1 – indoor hockey
- Gymnasium 2 – floorball

Two sport events will be held at the Assumption University Suvarnabhumi Campus in surrounding Samut Prakan Province, which were some of the main venues of the 2007 Summer Universiade.

- Aquatic Center – short course swimming
- Gymnasium – pencak silat

Additionally, stand-alone sports venues were located in various districts:

- Bangkok Arena in Nong Chok District – futsal (men's semi-finals and finals)
- Bangkok Thonburi University in Thawi Watthana District – futsal (women's tournament)
- Fashion Island Shopping Mall in Khan Na Yao District – sepaktakraw
- Major Ratchayothin Bangkok in Chatuchak District – bowling

Another stand-alone sports venue was located in surrounding Pathum Thani Province:

- Rangsit University – FPV drone racing, Teqball

Chonburi

Thirteen sport events will be held in Pattaya City, which were some of the main venues of the 2005 Asian Indoor Games.

- Ambassador Jomtien Center – billiard sports, chess, indoor rowing, kurash
- Eastern National Sports Training Center – indoor athletics
- Nongnooch Garden Pattaya – dancesport, ju-jitsu, karate, muaythai, sambo, taekwondo, wrestling
- Terminal 21 Pattaya Shopping Mall – esports

Other sports venues were located in capital Mueang Chonburi District:

- Multi Function Sports Stadium, Chonburi Town Municipality – volleyball (women's tournament)
- Sripatum University Chonburi Campus – kickboxing
- Thailand National Sports University Chonburi Campus – volleyball (men's tournament)

== The Games ==
=== Sports ===
The article 74 of the Olympic Council of Asia constitution states that the programme of the AIMAG shall include not less than six indoor sports and two sports from martial arts sports, recognised by the Olympic Council of Asia. For this to happen, it will be a responsibility of the organizing committee to choose which of twenty-nine sports included within the status of indoor sports or martial arts sports and not part in latest editions of the Asian Games. The organizing committee can choose any sports part in latest editions of the Asian Games or not within the status of indoor sports or martial arts sports, if there are demands from the host country.

Following the signing contract after successful negotiations with Thailand, the Olympic Council of Asia initially announced that the Games would feature twenty-six disciplines in twenty-four sports, including the seventeen indoor sports and seven martial sports and two demonstration sports established in the Games charter. On 21 May 2020, the Olympic Council of Asia and the organizing committee announced the final number of sports on this edition's program with finals being held in twenty eight sports, seven more than those held in the previous edition in 2017. The number of sports programme increased to twenty-nine sports after successful negotiations to add Olympic and Asian Games sports who are very popular at the country as shooting, badminton and volleyball, but this sports have to held non-olympic events.

Due to a ban imposed by the International Weightlifting Federation on Thailand, weightlifting events have to be excluded.

A total of thirty-two disciplines in thirty sports and two demonstration sports were scheduled to be included before the Games were cancelled.

- 3x3 basketball (2)
- Badminton (5)
- Billiard (15)
- Bowling (8)
- BMX racing (2)
- Cheerleading (4)
- Chess (6)
- Dancesport (14)
- Drone racing (3)
- Esports (4)
- Floorball (2)
- Futsal (2)
- Indoor athletics (27)
- Indoor hockey (2)
- Indoor rowing (10)
- Ju-jitsu (20)
- Karate (13)
- Kickboxing (7)
- Kurash (10)
- Muaythai (20)
- Netball (1)
- Pencak silat (11)
- Roller skiing (12)
- Sambo (8)
- Sepak takraw (11)
- Shooting (5)
- Short course swimming (30)
- Sport climbing (6)
- Taekwondo (20)
- Teqball (5)
- Volleyball (2)
- Wrestling (18)

==== Sports program ====
Cheerleading, Floorball, Indoor rowing and Netball are sports that have recently been approved by International Olympic Committee and are on the World Games program and have low popularity and visibity in certain regions of Asia. However, in other countries or regions of the continent they are extremely popular. Going according to the original proposal of the event, this was their chance to be part of the sports program of a multisport event, which certainly would have increased their visibility on the continent and increase the chances that they would be included in the Olympic Games program in the future.

==== Olympic Sports played in other formats ====
Twelve sports that are part of the current Olympic program (athletics, badminton, 3x3 basketball, football, hockey, roller sports, rowing, shooting, swimming, water polo and taekwondo) were planned to be in this edition's program, however, some of them would have been played in formats that are not part of the Olympic Games. Among these, four were new sports (badminton, shooting, volleyball and water polo). Although they are part of the Asian Games programme too, the organizing committee would have revamped the events to differ from current Asian Games programme. Badminton events would have been reduced from 7 at the Asian Games to 3, for example The number of events in the shooting would've also dropped from 20 to just 5, only the pistol events (10 and 25 meters) were scheduled to be held. Changes were also planned in volleyball tournaments. Each participating team would have been able to register 12 athletes, however, up to 3 athletes may have been over 23 years old.

Another specific case is that of sepak takraw, after 12 years hiatus the sport was planned to be back on the program. As the national sport of Thailand, the format of the competitions and the number of events at the last Asian Games would have been maintained. In addition, the four events that were excluded from Hangzhou would have bene added, along the hoop and five extra events would have been added to the program.

== Participating National Olympic Committees ==
On July 16, 2020, the National Olympic Committee of Thailand announced that it proposed to the Olympic Council of Asia (OCA) to open the event for athletes from the 24 National Olympic Committees from the Oceania National Olympic Committees (ONOC). The proposal was accepted without any reservations by the OCA and the ONOC, as they proved the success on the 2017 Games held in Ashgabat and the 2017 Sapporo Winter Games. The three stakeholders were planning to authorize the registration of athletes in 16 individual sports as an integral part of the games.

=== Calendar ===
This was the planned calendar at the time of cancellation.

All dates are ICT (UTC+7)

OC	Opening ceremony	●	Event competitions	1	Event finals	CC	Closing ceremony

May 2021	18th Tue	19th Wed	20th Thu	21st Fri	22nd Sat	23rd Sun	24th Mon	25th Tue	26th Wed	27th Thu	28th Fri	29th Sat	30th Sun	Events
Ceremonies				OC									CC	—N/a
3x3 basketball						●	●	●	●	●	2			2
Badminton					●	●	●	●	2	3				5
Billiard sports			●		●	4	●	3	1	3	●	4		15
BMX cycling									1	1	1	1		4
Bowling							1	1	1	1	●	●	4	8
Cheerleading											●	4		4
Chess						●	●	●	●	6				6
Dancesport						8	6							14
Esports							●	●	2	●	●	4		6
Floorball					●	●	●	●	●	●	●	2		2
Futsal	●	●	●		●	●	●	●	●	1	1			2
Indoor athletics										9	8	10		27
Indoor hockey					●	●	●	●	●	●	●	2		2
Indoor rowing										●	10			10
Ju-jitsu					5	5	5	5						20
Karate										4	4	5		13
Kickboxing					●	2	3							5
Kurash						4	4							8
Muaythai					●	●	●	●	●	●	21			21
Netball					●	●	●	●	●	1				1
Pencak silat								●	●	●	●	11		11
Roller sports									3	3	3	3		12
Sambo										3	2	3		8
Sepaktakraw					3	1	●	5	●	1	●	1		11
Shooting										1	2	2		5
Short course swimming									8	7	8	7		30
Sport climbing						●	2	2	2					6
Taekwondo			3	3	5	5	4							20
Wrestling					3	4	3							10
Volleyball			●	●	●	●	●	●	●	●	●	2		2
Daily medal events	0	0	3	3	16	33	28	16	20	44	62	61	4	290
Cumulative total	0	0	3	6	22	55	83	99	119	163	225	286	290	290
May 2021	18th Tue	19th Wed	20th Thu	21st Fri	22nd Sat	23rd Sun	24th Mon	25th Tue	26th Wed	27th Thu	28th Fri	29th Sat	30th Sun	Total events
Demonstration events
May 2021	18th Tue	19th Wed	20th Thu	21st Fri	22nd Sat	23rd Sun	24th Mon	25th Tue	26th Wed	27th Thu	28th Fri	29th Sat	30th Sun	Events
Ceremonies				OC									CC	—N/a
FPV drone racing					●	●	3							3
Teqball									●	●	●	5		5
Daily medal events	0	0	0	0	0	0	3	0	0	0	0	5	0	8
Cumulative total	0	0	0	0	0	0	3	3	3	3	3	8	8	8
May 2021	18th Tue	19th Wed	20th Thu	21st Fri	22nd Sat	23rd Sun	24th Mon	25th Tue	26th Wed	27th Thu	28th Fri	29th Sat	30th Sun	Total events

== Marketing ==
=== Emblem ===
The emblem of the 2021 Asian Indoor and Martial Arts Games was inspired by the flower garland called Phuang malai, symbolizing the interconnectedness of all participants from all parts of Asia. Thai garland represents respect, victory, dignity, and the power of hope. The official slogan of the games was "Garland of Hope".

=== Mascots ===
The official mascot depicted a fighting parrot wearing a mongkhon (a type of headgear worn by Muay Thai athletes) who has intelligence, agility and a fighting spirit, making a gesture of inviting athletes and sports competitors to the victory of friendship.

== See also ==
- Asian Indoor and Martial Arts Games celebrated in Thailand
  - 2005 Asian Indoor Games – Bangkok
  - 2009 Asian Martial Arts Games – Bangkok

Preceded by Ashgabat	Asian Indoor and Martial Arts Games; Bangkok and Chonburi; VI Asian Indoor and Martial Arts Games (2021)	Succeeded by Riyadh
