= Afghanistan at the Asian Games =

- IOC code: AFG
- NOC: National Olympic Committee of the Islamic Republic of Afghanistan
- Medals Ranked 39th: Gold 0 Silver 7 Bronze 14 Total 21

Summer appearances
- 1951; 1954; 1958; 1962; 1966; 1970; 1974; 1978; 1982; 1986; 1990; 1994; 1998; 2002; 2006; 2010; 2014; 2018; 2022; 2026

Winter appearances
- 2007; 2011; 2017; 2025; 2029

Afghanistan is a member of the Central Asian Zone of the Olympic Council of Asia (OCA), and has participated in the Asian Games since their inception in 1951. Afghanistan has also participated at the Asian Winter Games since 2007 but missed the 2017 edition held in Sapporo. The National Olympic Committee of the Islamic Republic of Afghanistan, established in 1935 and recognised by the International Olympic Committee in 1936, is the National Olympic Committee for Afghanistan. The Committee is currently in exile and presided by Hafizullah Wali Rahimi: the International Olympic Committee has not recognized the Taliban regime's Committee, headed by Ahmadullah Wasiq.

Afghanistan was one of the five founding members of the Asian Games Federation on 13 February 1949, in New Delhi; the organisation was disbanded on 26 November 1981 and replaced by the Olympic Council of Asia.

== Membership of Olympic Council of Asia ==
Afghanistan is a member of the Central Asian Zone of the Olympic Council of Asia, the governing body of all the sports in Asia, recognised by the International Olympic Committee as the continental association of Asia.^{[a]} It was a member of the South Asian Zone, where Afghanistan participated in the South Asian Games, from 2004 to 2016.

The OCA organises five major continental-level multi-sport events: the Asian Summer Games (which are commonly known as the Asian Games), Asian Winter Games, Asian Indoor-Martial Arts Games, Asian Beach Games, and Asian Youth Games. Before 2009, Indoor and Martial Arts were two separate events for indoor and martial arts sports respectively. However, the OCA has since amalgamated them into a single event, the Asian Indoor-Martial Arts Games, which will be debuted in 2013 in Incheon, South Korea. As a member of OCA, Afghanistan is privileged to participate in all these multi-sport events.

== Asian Games ==
Afghanistan has competed in the Asian Games since the inaugural edition of the Games in 1951 in New Delhi. On 26 September 1996, the Taliban took over Kabul and established the Islamic Emirate of Afghanistan. Under the Taliban regime all types of sporting activities were deprecated, as according to the Taliban, most of them were against the teachings of Islam and Islamic law. Many stadiums, like Ghazi Stadium of Kabul, were either destroyed or converted into venues for public executions and punishments. Women were banned from taking part in any type of sport; male athletes were allowed to participate in a few sports, but were forced to wear long sleeves, trousers and beards. Following such incidents and discrimination against women, the International Olympic Committee (IOC) banned the Afghanistan National Olympic Committee and barred them from taking part in the Olympic Games.

A few months before the 2000 Summer Olympics, the IOC offered the Afghanistan National Olympic Committee the opportunity to send a contingent to the Games without the Taliban flag. The Committee declined to take part on this condition.

Participation of Afghan sportsmen without representing the Emirate (Afghanistan) and its flag will mean nothing. We will not send anyone on an individual basis

— Abdul Shukoor Mutmaen

Afghanistan did not send a delegation to the 1998 Asian Games held in Bangkok, Thailand, due to economic difficulties. Laws implemented by the Taliban government also made it impossible for Afghan athletes to compete. For example, the International Boxing Association (AIBA) does not allow players to have beards and mustaches, but Afghan males were forbidden to cut their facial hair. Afghanistan returned to the Asian Games after the fall of the Taliban government in the midst of an ongoing war. In June 2003, the IOC lifted the suspension imposed on Afghanistan during the 115th IOC Session in Prague.

Afghanistan status unclear for the future participation since brought under the political turmoil. In 2022 Asian Games, Afghanistan participated with 68 male and 15 female athletes. All 83 athletes competed under the flag and anthem of the Islamic Republic of Afghanistan.

=== Medals by games ===
Peach colour indicates best performance

Games	Rank	Gold	Silver	Bronze	Total
(India) 1951 New Delhi	-	0	0	0	0
(Philippines) 1954 Manila	11	0	1	0	1
(Japan) 1958 Tokyo	-	0	0	0	0
(Indonesia) 1962 Jakarta	13	0	0	1	1
(Thailand) 1966 Bangkok	-	0	0	0	0
(Thailand) 1970 Bangkok	did not participate				
(Iran) 1974 Tehran	19	0	0	1	1
(Thailand) 1978 Bangkok	did not participate				
(India) 1982 New Delhi	17	0	1	0	1
(South Korea) 1986 Seoul	did not participate				
(China) 1990 Beijing	-	0	0	0	0
(Japan) 1994 Hiroshima	-	0	0	0	0
(Thailand) 1998 Bangkok	did not participate				
(South Korea) 2002 Busan	36	0	0	1	1
(Qatar) 2006 Doha	36	0	0	1	1
(China) 2010 Guangzhou	29	0	2	1	3
(South Korea) 2014 Incheon	35	0	1	1	2
(Indonesia) 2018 Jakarta & Palembang	35	0	0	2	2
(China) 2022 Hangzhou	30	0	1	4	5
(Japan) 2026 Nagoya	32	0	1	2	3
(Qatar) 2030 Doha	Future event				
(Saudi Arabia) 2034 Riyadh	Future event				
Total	39	0	7	14	21

== Asian Winter Games ==
=== Medals by games ===
Games	Rank	Gold	Silver	Bronze	Total
2007 Changchun		0	0	0	0
2011 Astana & Almaty		0	0	0	0
2025 Harbin		0	0	0	0
Total		0	0	0	0

== Asian Beach Games ==
Afghanistan has competed in both the editions of the Asian Beach Games. In the 2008 Asian Beach Games, Afghanistan won two medals, a gold and a bronze. In the 2010 Asian Beach Games in Muscat, no Afghan athletes won any medals.

=== Medals by games ===
Games	Rank	Gold	Silver	Bronze	Total
2008 Bali	18	1	0	1	2
2010 Muscat		0	0	0	0
2012 Haiyang	9	1	0	0	1
2014 Phuket	31	0	2	2	4
2016 Danang	32	0	0	3	3
Total	31	2	2	6	10

== Asian Indoor and Martial Arts Games ==
=== Medals by games ===
Games	Rank	Gold	Silver	Bronze	Total
Asian Indoor Games
2007 Macau		0	0	0	0
2009 Hanoi	26	0	2	2	4
Asian Martial Arts Games
2009 Bangkok	15	2	2	8	12
Asian Indoor and Martial Arts Games
2013 Incheon	25	0	0	3	3
2017 Ashgabat	26	1	1	10	3
Total	29	3	5	23	31

== Asian Youth Games ==
The First Asian Youth Games were held in Singapore from 29 June 2009 to 7 July 2009 and featured over 90 sporting events. Afghanistan did not send its delegation to the Games.

=== Medals by games ===
Games	Rank	Gold	Silver	Bronze	Total
2013 Nanjing		0	0	0	0
Total		0	0	0	0

== Medals by sport ==
Leading in that sport

=== Asian Games ===
Sport	Gold	Silver	Bronze	Total
Cricket	0	3	0	3
Kurash	0	0	2	2
Taekwondo	0	1	5	6
Wrestling	0	2	2	4
Wushu	0	0	3	3
Total	0	6	12	18

== See also ==
- Category:Asian Games competitors for Afghanistan
- Afghanistan at the Olympics
- Afghanistan at the Paralympics

== Notes and references ==
Notes

- ^{a} The National Olympic Committees are all members of the Association of National Olympic Committees (ANOC), which is also split among five continental associations: Association of National Olympic Committees of Africa, Pan American Sports Organization, Olympic Council of Asia, European Olympic Committees, and Oceania National Olympic Committees.
