= Mongolia at the Asian Games =

- IOC code: MGL
- NOC: Mongolian National Olympic Committee
- Medals Ranked 21st: Gold 29 Silver 52 Bronze 117 Total 198

Summer appearances
- 1974; 1978; 1982; 1986; 1990; 1994; 1998; 2002; 2006; 2010; 2014; 2018; 2022; 2026

Winter appearances
- 1986; 1990; 1996; 1999; 2003; 2007; 2011; 2017; 2025; 2029

Mongolia first competed at the Asian Games in 1974, and has participated twelve times in the Asian Games until 2026.

== Medals by Asian Games ==
Peach colour indicates best performance

Games	Rank	Gold	Silver	Bronze	Total
1974 Tehran	10	2	5	8	15
1978 Bangkok	13	1	3	5	9
1982 Delhi	9	3	3	1	7
1986 Seoul	Boycotted				
1990 Beijing	12	1	7	9	17
1994 Hiroshima	18	1	2	6	9
1998 Bangkok	19	2	2	10	14
2002 Busan	26	1	1	12	14
2006 Doha	21	2	5	8	15
2010 Guangzhou	21	2	5	9	16
2014 Incheon	16	5	4	12	21
2018 Jakarta & Palembang	16	5	9	11	25
2022 Hangzhou	22	3	5	13	21
2026 Nagoya	27	1	1	13	15
2030 Doha	Future event				
2034 Riyadh	Future event				
Total	21	29	52	117	198

=== Medals by sport ===
Sport	Gold	Silver	Bronze	Total
Wrestling	12	18	29	59
Judo	7	11	32	50
Shooting	3	4	7	14
Boxing	2	6	15	23
Sambo	1	2	1	4
Archery	1	0	0	1
Kurash	0	2	0	2
Ju-jitsu	0	0	3	3
Wushu	0	0	2	2
Taekwondo	0	0	1	1
Totals (10 entries)	26	43	90	159

== Medals by Asian Winter Games ==
Games	Rank	Gold	Silver	Bronze	Total
1986 Sapporo	-	0	0	0	0
1990 Sapporo	5	0	0	1	1
1996 Harbin	-	0	0	0	0
1999 Gangwon	-	0	0	0	0
2003 Aomori	-	0	0	0	0
2007 Changchun	5	0	0	1	1
2011 Astana & Almaty	5	0	1	4	5
2017 Sapporo & Obihiro	-	0	0	0	0
2025 Harbin	-	0	0	0	0
2029 Trojena	Future event				
Total	8	0	1	6	7

== East Asian Games ==
=== Medals by sport ===
Sport	Gold	Silver	Bronze	Total
Boxing	0	0	0	0
Judo	0	0	0	0
Wrestling	0	0	0	0
Totals (3 entries)	0	0	0	0

== Multiple Asian Games medalists ==
Athlete	Sport	Asian Games	Gold	Silver	Bronze	Total
	Wrestling					
	Wrestling					

== See also ==
- Mongolia at the Olympics
- List of Mongolians
