= Yemen at the Asian Games =

- IOC code: YEM
- NOC: Yemen Olympic Committee
- Website: www.nocyemen.org (in Arabic and English)
- Medals Ranked 43rd: Gold 0 Silver 0 Bronze 2 Total 2

Summer appearances
- 1990; 1994; 1998; 2002; 2006; 2010; 2014; 2018; 2022; 2026

Other related appearances
- North Yemen (1982, 1986); South Yemen (1982)

Yemen first competed at the Asian Games in 1998.

== Asian Games ==
=== Medals by Asian ===
Games	Gold	Silver	Bronze	Total	Rank
(India) 1951 New Delhi to (Thailand) 1978 Bangkok	did not compete				
(India) 1982 New Delhi	competed as (Yemen Arab Republic) North Yemen and South Yemen				
(South Korea) 1986 Seoul	competed as (Yemen Arab Republic) North Yemen				
(China) 1990 Beijing	0	0	0	0	–
(Japan) 1994 Hiroshima	0	0	0	0	–
(Thailand) 1998 Bangkok	0	0	0	0	–
(South Korea) 2002 Busan	0	0	1	1	36
(Qatar) 2006 Doha	0	0	1	1	36
(China) 2010 Guangzhou	0	0	0	0	–
(South Korea) 2014 Incheon	0	0	0	0	–
(Indonesia) 2018 Jakarta–Palembang	0	0	0	0	–
(China) 2022 Hangzhou	0	0	0	0	–
(Japan) 2026 Aichi	0	0	0	0	–
(Qatar) 2030 Doha	future event				
Total	0	0	2	2	43

=== Medals by sport ===
Sport	Gold	Silver	Bronze	Total
Taekwondo	0	0	1	1
Wushu	0	0	1	1
Totals (2 entries)	0	0	2	2

=== Medals by individual ===
Medal	Name	Games	Sport	Event
Bronze	Akram Al-Noor	2002 Busan	Taekwondo	Men's finweight
Bronze	Naji Al-Ashwal	2006 Doha	Wushu	Men's sanshou 52 kg

== Asian Para Games ==
=== Medals by Games ===
Games	Gold	Silver	Bronze	Total	Rank
(China) Guangzhou 2010	did not participate				
(South Korea) Incheon 2014	did not participate				
(Indonesia) Jakarta 2018	0	0	0	0	-
(China) Hangzhou 2022	0	0	1	1	28
(Japan) Nagoya 2026	future event				
Total	0	0	1	14	39

=== Medals by sport ===
Games	Gold	Silver	Bronze	Total
Judo	0	0	1	1
Total	0	0	1	1

== Asian Beach Games ==
=== Medals by Games ===
Games	Gold	Silver	Bronze	Total	Rank
(Indonesia) Bali 2008	0	0	0	0	-
(Oman) Muscat 2010	0	1	2	3	20
(China) Haiyang 2012	0	0	0	0	-
(Thailand) Phuket 2014	1 (Note: Athlete Ahmed Ayash originally won silver in kurash, but Uzbekistani gold-medalist Sanjar Tukhtashov was stripped of his medal after testing positive for doping. It is unclear whether Ayash was reawarded with a gold medal.)	0	0	1	26
(Vietnam) Da Nang 2016	did not participate				
(China) Sanya 2026	future event				
Total	1	1	2	4	34

=== Medals by sport ===
Games	Gold	Silver	Bronze	Total
Kurash	1	0	0	1
Tent pegging	0	1	2	3
Total	1	1	2	4

== See also ==
- Yemen at the Olympics
- Yemen at the Paralympics
