= Myanmar at the Asian Games =

- IOC code: MYA
- NOC: Myanmar Olympic Committee
- Medals Ranked 24th: Gold 19 Silver 29 Bronze 59 Total 107

Summer appearances
- 1951; 1954; 1958; 1962; 1966; 1970; 1974; 1978; 1982; 1986; 1990; 1994; 1998; 2002; 2006; 2010; 2014; 2018; 2022; 2026

Myanmar (also known as Burma) is a member of the Southeast Asian Zone of the Olympic Council of Asia (OCA), and has participated in the Asian Games since the inception of the Games in 1951. The Myanmar Olympic Committee, established in 1947 and recognised in the same year by the International Olympic Committee, is the National Olympic Committee for Myanmar.

Myanmar was one of the first five founding members of the Asian Games Federation on 13 February 1949, in New Delhi; the organisation was disbanded on 26 November 1981 and replaced by the Olympic Council of Asia.

== Membership of Olympic Council of Asia ==
Myanmar is a member of the South East Asian Zone of the Olympic Council of Asia, the governing body of all the sports in Asia, recognised by the International Olympic Committee as the continental association of Asia.^{[a]} Being a member of the South East Asian Zone, Myanmar also participates in the South East Asian Games, sub-regional Games for South East Asia.

The OCA organises five major continental-level multi-sport events: the Asian Summer Games (which are commonly known as the Asian Games), Asian Winter Games, Asian Indoor-Martial Arts Games, Asian Beach Games, and Asian Youth Games. Before 2009, Indoor and Martial Arts were two separate events, specialised for indoor and martial arts sports respectively. However, since then the OCA has amalgamated them into a single event, the Asian Indoor-Martial Arts Games, which will be debuted in 2013 in Incheon, South Korea. As a member of OCA, Myanmar is privileged to participate in all these multi-sport events.

== Summer Games results ==
Myanmar has participated in all the editions of the Asian Games except in the 1986 Games in Seoul. As of the latest Games, in Jakarta and Palembang in 2018, Myanmar has won a total of 16 gold, 31 silver, and 53 bronze medals.

=== Medals by Games ===
Games	Athletes	Gold	Silver	Bronze	Total	Rank
(India) New Delhi 1951	58	0	0	3	3	8
(Philippines) Manila 1954	34	2	0	2	4	8
(Japan) Tokyo 1958	36	1	2	1	4	9
(Indonesia) Jakarta 1962	31	2	1	5	8	9
(Thailand) Bangkok 1966	70	1	0	4	5	12
(Thailand) Bangkok 1970	14	3	2	7	12	8
(Iran) Tehran 1974	46	1	2	3	6	14
(Thailand) Bangkok 1978	42	0	3	3	6	16
(India) New Delhi 1982	9	0	0	0	0	–
(South Korea) Seoul 1986	did not participate					
(China) 1990 Beijing	31	0	0	2	2	21
(Japan) 1994 Hiroshima	12	0	0	2	2	29
(Thailand) 1998 Bangkok	76	1	6	4	11	20
(South Korea) 2002 Busan	63	1	5	6	12	23
(Qatar) 2006 Doha	40	0	4	7	11	27
(China) 2010 Guangzhou	69	2	5	3	10	22
(South Korea) 2014 Incheon	64	2	1	1	4	20
(Indonesia) 2018 Jakarta-Palembang	112	0	0	2	2	35
(China) 2022 Hangzhou	117	1	0	2	3	27
(Japan) Aichi-Nagoya 2026	59	2	1	2	5	24
(Qatar) Doha 2030	Future event					
(Saudi Arabia) Riyadh 2034	Future event					
Total		19	29	59	107	24

== List of medalists ==
Medal	Name	Games	Sport	Event
Bronze	Ba Thein	1951 New Delhi	Weightlifting	Men's Middleweight (75kg)
Bronze	Thein Han	1951 New Delhi	Weightlifting	Men's Light Heavyweight (82.5kg)
Bronze	Maung Manug Lwin	1951 New Delhi	Weightlifting	Men's Middle Heavyweight (90kg)

== Indoor Games results ==
Myanmar has sent its delegates to all editions of the Asian Indoor Games. The 2007 Games in Macau, held from 26 October to 3 November 2007, were the only revision of the Games in which Myanma athletes won medals (two silver). Myanmar did not medal at the 2005 and 2009 Asian Indoor Games.

== Beach Games results ==
Myanmar contingents have competed in both the editions of the Asian Beach Games—a biennial multi-sport event which features sporting events played on sea beach. Myanmar finished in ninth place in the 2008 Games in Bali, winning a total of five medals (including two gold). Two silvers were won by Myanma athletes during the 2010 Games in Muscat, and the nation fell to the 17th spot in the final medal table standings.

== Martial Arts Games results ==
Myanmar competed in the First Asian Martial Arts Games held in Bangkok, Thailand, from 1 to 9 August 2009. Two medals were won by Myanmar in the Games, one silver and a bronze, leading to the country finishing 28th in the medal table.

== Youth Games results ==
Myanmar sent a delegation to the 2009 Asian Youth Games, the first edition of the Games, held in Singapore from 29 June to 7 July 2009. Myanmar won a bronze medal in the Games, finishing in last place (21st) in the medal table.

== See also ==
- Myanmar at the Olympics
- Myanmar at the Paralympics
- Myanmar at the Asian Para Games
- Myanmar at the Southeast Asian Games

== Notes and references ==
Notes

- ^{a} The National Olympic Committees are all members of the Association of National Olympic Committees (ANOC), which is also split among five continental associations: Association of National Olympic Committees of Africa, Pan American Sports Organization, Olympic Council of Asia, European Olympic Committees, and Oceania National Olympic Committees.
