= Palestine at the Asian Games =

- IOC code: PLE
- NOC: Palestine Olympic Committee
- Medals Ranked 43rd: Gold 0 Silver 0 Bronze 2 Total 2

Summer appearances
- 1990; 1994; 1998; 2002; 2006; 2010; 2014; 2018; 2022; 2026

Winter appearances
- 2003; 2007; 2011; 2017; 2025; 2029

The State of Palestine first competed at the Asian Games in 1990.

== Asian Games ==
=== Medals by Games ===
Games	Gold	Silver	Bronze	Total	Rank
(China) 1990 Beijing	0	0	0	0	–
(Japan) 1994 Hiroshima	0	0	0	0	–
(Thailand) 1998 Bangkok	0	0	0	0	–
(South Korea) 2002 Busan	0	0	1	1	36
(Qatar) 2006 Doha	0	0	0	0	–
(China) 2010 Guangzhou	0	0	0	0	–
(South Korea) 2014 Incheon	0	0	0	0	–
(Indonesia) 2018 Jakarta–Palembang	0	0	0	0	–
(China) 2022 Hangzhou	0	0	1	1	38
(Japan) 2026 Aichi	0	0	0	0	–
(Qatar) 2030 Doha	Future event				
Total	0	0	2	2	44

=== List of medalists ===
Medal	Name	Games	Sport	Event
Bronze	Munir Abu-Keshek	2002 Busan	Boxing	Men's light heavyweight
Bronze	Hala Al-Qadi	2022 Hangzhou	Karate	Women's 68 kg kumite

=== Medals by sport ===
Sport	Gold	Silver	Bronze	Total
Boxing	0	0	1	1
Karate	0	0	1	1
Totals (2 entries)	0	0	2	2

== Asian Winter Games ==
=== Medals by Games ===
Games	Gold	Silver	Bronze	Total	Rank
(Japan) 2003 Aomori	0	0	0	0	–
(China) 2007 Changchun	0	0	0	0	–
(Kazakhstan) 2011 Astana–Almaty	0	0	0	0	–
(Japan) 2017 Sapporo	did not participate				
(China) 2025 Harbin	did not participate				
(Saudi Arabia) 2029 Neom	future event				
Total	0	0	0	0	–

== See also ==
- Palestine at the Olympics
