= Maldives at the Asian Games =

- IOC code: MDV
- NOC: Maldives Olympic Committee
- Medals: Gold 0 Silver 0 Bronze 0 Total 0

Summer appearances
- 1982; 1986; 1990; 1994; 1998; 2002; 2006; 2010; 2014; 2018; 2022; 2026

Maldives first competed at the Asian Games in 1982. As of 2024, it has not won any medals at the games.
