= Uzbekistan at the Asian Games =

- IOC code: UZB
- NOC: National Olympic Committee of the Republic of Uzbekistan
- Medals Ranked 10th: Gold 126 Silver 163 Bronze 195 Total 484

Summer appearances
- 1994; 1998; 2002; 2006; 2010; 2014; 2018; 2022; 2026

Winter appearances
- 1996; 1999; 2003; 2007; 2011; 2017; 2025; 2029

Uzbekistan first competed at the Asian Games in 1994 (Summer) and 1996 (Winter).

== Medals ==
Peach colour indicates best performance

Games	Gold	Silver	Bronze	Total	Rank
(Japan) 1994 Hiroshima	11	12	19	42	5
(Thailand) 1998 Bangkok	6	22	12	40	10
(South Korea) 2002 Busan	15	12	24	51	5
(Qatar) 2006 Doha	11	14	15	40	7
(China) 2010 Guangzhou	11	22	23	56	8
(South Korea) 2014 Incheon	9	14	22	45	11
(Indonesia) 2018 Jakarta–Palembang	20	24	25	69	5
(China) 2022 Hangzhou	22	18	31	71	5
(Japan) 2026 Nagoya	21	25	24	70	5
Total	126	163	195	484	10

== Medalists ==
Medals by sport
Sport	1st place, gold medalist(s)	2nd place, silver medalist(s)	3rd place, bronze medalist(s)	Total

Medals by day
Day	Date	1st place, gold medalist(s)	2nd place, silver medalist(s)	3rd place, bronze medalist(s)	Total

Medals by gender
Gender	1st place, gold medalist(s)	2nd place, silver medalist(s)	3rd place, bronze medalist(s)	Total	Percentage

The following Uzbekistan competitors won medals at the Games.

Medal	Name	Sport	Event	Date

== Medals by sport ==
Sport	Gold	Silver	Bronze	Total
Athletics	13	19	15	47
Boxing	23	20	23	66
Canoeing	16	25	23	64
Chess	1	3	2	6
Cycling	3	2	1	6
Fencing	1	0	2	3
Football	1	0	1	2
Gymnastics	5	12	7	24
Judo	5	8	25	38
Karate	1	4	6	11
Kurash	9	3	5	17
Pencak silat	0	0	1	1
Rowing	5	9	8	22
Sambo	1	1	2	4
Shooting	1	3	4	8
Swimming	1	0	2	3
Taekwondo	2	8	6	16
Tennis	2	3	7	12
Water polo	0	1	1	2
Weightlifting	1	6	10	17
Wrestling	13	14	20	47
Wushu	0	1	0	1
Total	104	138	169	411
