= Saudi Arabia at the Asian Games =

- IOC code: KSA
- NOC: Saudi Arabian Olympic Committee
- Website: www.olympic.sa
- Medals Ranked 20th: Gold 33 Silver 18 Bronze 44 Total 95

Summer appearances
- 1978; 1982; 1986; 1990; 1994; 1998; 2002; 2006; 2010; 2014; 2018; 2022; 2026

Saudi Arabia first competed at the Asian Games in 1978 Asian Games in Bangkok.

Saudi Arabia won first medal at the 1982 Asian Games in New Delhi, when Saudi Arabia national football team took home a bronze medal.

== Asian Games ==
=== Medals by games ===
*Red border color indicates tournament was held on home soil.

Peach colour indicates best performance

Games	Gold	Silver	Bronze	Total	Rank
(Thailand) 1978 Bangkok	0	0	0	0	-
(India) 1982 New Delhi	0	0	1	1	19
(South Korea) 1986 Seoul	0	1	0	1	19
(China) 1990 Beijing	0	0	1	1	22
(Japan) 1994 Hiroshima	1	3	5	9	16
(Thailand) 1998 Bangkok	Did not participate				
(South Korea) 2002 Busan	7	1	1	9	11
(Qatar) 2006 Doha	8	0	6	14	13
(China) 2010 Guangzhou	5	3	5	13	13
(South Korea) 2014 Incheon	3	3	1	7	19
(Indonesia) 2018 Jakarta–Palembang	1	2	3	6	25
(China) 2022 Hangzhou	4	2	4	10	19
(Japan) 2026 Aichi–Nagoya	4	3	10	17	18
(Qatar) 2030 Doha	Future event				
(Saudi Arabia) 2034 Riyadh	Future event				
Total	33	18	44	95	20

=== Medals by sport ===
Sport	Rank	Gold	Silver	Bronze	Total
Athletics	9	19	7	9	35
Bowling	9	2	0	2	4
Boxing	22	0	1	1	2
Equestrian	3	9	2	3	14
Esports	10	0	1	2	3
Football	13	0	1	1	2
Handball	10	0	0	1	1
Ju-jitsu	5	2	0	5	7
Karate	15	0	5	7	12
Shooting	19	1	1	0	2
Taekwondo	21	0	0	3	3
Volleyball	9	0	0	1	1
Total	20	33	18	44	95

== Asian Winter Games ==
=== Medals by games ===
*Red border color indicates tournament was held on home soil.

Games	Gold	Silver	Bronze	Total	Rank
(Saudi Arabia) 2029 Trojena	Future event				
Total	1	0	0	0	0

== Asian Para Games ==
=== Medals by games ===
*Red border color indicates tournament was held on home soil.

Games	Gold	Silver	Bronze	Total	Rank
(China) 2010 Guangzhou	1	4	1	6	16
(South Korea) 2014 Incheon	2	1	1	4	18
(Indonesia) 2018 Jakarta	2	3	3	8	19
(China) 2022 Hangzhou	2	4	3	9	19
(Japan) 2026 Aichi-Nagoya	Future event				
(Qatar) 2030 Doha	Future event				
(Saudi Arabia) 2035 Riyadh	Future event				
Total	7	12	8	27	19

=== Medalists ===
Medal	Name	Sport	Event	Games
Gold	Ahmed Adawi	Athletics	Men's 200 metres T35	2018 Jakarta
Gold	Nour al-Sana	Athletics	Men's 400 metres T44/62/64	2018 Jakarta
Silver	Ahmed Adawi	Athletics	Men's 100 metres T35	2018 Jakarta
Silver	Nour al-Sana	Athletics	Men's 200 metres T44/62/64	2018 Jakarta
Silver	Hani Alnakhli	Athletics	Men's shot put F33	2018 Jakarta
Bronze	Ali al-Nakhli	Athletics	Men's 100 metres T37	2018 Jakarta
Bronze	Fahad al-Ganaidl	Athletics	Men's 100 metres T53	2018 Jakarta
Bronze	Radhi al-Harthi	Athletics	Men's Club Throw F51	2018 Jakarta

== Asian Indoor and Martial Arts Games ==
=== Medals by games ===
*Red border color indicates tournament was held on home soil.

Games	Athlete	Gold	Silver	Bronze	Total	Rank
Asian Indoor Games

=== Medalists ===
Medal	Name	Sport	Event	Games
Gold	Ismail Al-Sabiani	Indoor athletics	Men's 400 metres	2009 Hanoi
Gold	Ahmed Faiz	Indoor athletics	Men's long jump	2009 Hanoi
Gold	Mohammed Al-Qaree	Indoor athletics	Men's heptathlon	2009 Hanoi
Gold	Ahmed Al-Muwallad	Indoor athletics	Men's 60 metres hurdles	2017 Ashgabat
Gold	Mohammed Al-Qaree	Indoor athletics	Men's heptathlon	2017 Ashgabat
Gold	Khaled Al-Mobty; Khaled Al-Eid; Saad Al-Ajmi; Abdullah Al-Sharbatly	Equestrian	Team jumping	2017 Ashgabat
Silver	Mazen Al-Yassin	Indoor athletics	Men's 400 metres	2017 Ashgabat
Silver	Mohammed Shaween	Indoor athletics	Men's 1500 metres	2017 Ashgabat
Silver	Tariq Al-Amri	Indoor athletics	Men's 3000 metres	2017 Ashgabat

== Asian Youth Games ==
=== Medalists ===
Medal	Name	Sport	Event	Games
Silver	Nader Al-Haydar	Athletics	Boys' 110 metres hurdles	2009 Singapore
Bronze	Abdullah Ahmed Abkar	Athletics	Boys' 400 metres	2009 Singapore
Bronze	Mohammed Al-Hasan	Athletics	Boys' long jump	2009 Singapore
Gold	Hussain Al-Hizam	Athletics	Boys' pole vault	2013 Nanjing

== Asian Youth Para Games ==
=== Medals by games ===
Games	Gold	Silver	Bronze	Total	Rank
(Japan) 2009 Tokyo	Did not participate				
(Malaysia) 2013 Kuala Lumpur	1	1	3	5	19
(United Arab Emirates) 2017 Dubai	10	3	3	16	9
(Bahrain) 2021 Manama	2	5	19	26	15
Total	13	9	25	47	18
