= Syria at the Asian Games =

- IOC code: SYR
- NOC: Syrian Olympic Committee
- Medals Ranked 27th: Gold 9 Silver 8 Bronze 16 Total 33

Summer appearances
- 1951; 1954; 1958; 1962; 1966; 1970; 1974; 1978; 1982; 1986; 1990; 1994; 1998; 2002; 2006; 2010; 2014; 2018; 2022; 2026

Syria first competed at the Asian Games in 1978 and is also a member of the West Asian Zone of the Olympic Council of Asia (OCA). The National Olympic Committee for Syria is the Syrian Olympic Committee, founded in 1948. Syria is yet to make its debut at the Asian Winter Games. Syria got its first gold medal in 1978 Asian Games, when Talal Najjar won the weightlifting 110 kg event.

== Medal tables ==
=== Medals by Asian Games ===
Peach colour indicates best performance

Games	Gold	Silver	Bronze	Total	Rank
(India) 1951 New Delhi	Did not participate				
(Philippines) 1954 Manila	Did not participate				
(Japan) 1958 Tokyo	Did not participate				
(Indonesia) 1962 Jakarta	Did not participate				
(Thailand) 1966 Bangkok	Did not participate				
(Thailand) 1970 Bangkok	Did not participate				
(Iran) 1974 Tehran	Did not participate				
(Thailand) 1978 Bangkok	1	0	0	1	15
(India) 1982 New Delhi	1	1	1	3	14
(South Korea) 1986 Seoul	Did not participate				
(China) 1990 Beijing	1	0	2	3	14
(Japan) 1994 Hiroshima	3	3	1	7	13
(Thailand) 1998 Bangkok	0	2	4	6	26
(South Korea) 2002 Busan	0	0	3	3	32
(Qatar) 2006 Doha	2	2	2	6	23
(China) 2010 Guangzhou	1	0	1	2	29
(South Korea) 2014 Incheon	0	0	0	0	–
(Indonesia) 2018 Jakarta–Palembang	0	0	1	1	37
(China) 2022 Hangzhou	0	0	1	1	38
Total	9	8	16	33	27

=== Medals by West Asian Games ===
Games	Gold	Silver	Bronze	Total	Rank
(Iran) 1997 Tehran	16	22	13	51	3
2002 Kuwait City	8	11	19	38	4
(Qatar) 2005 Doha	20	13	17	50	4
Total	44	46	49	139	

=== Medals by Asian Indoor and Martial Arts Games ===
Games	Gold	Silver	Bronze	Total	Rank
Asian Indoor Games
(Thailand) 2005 Bangkok	0	1	0	1	22
2007 Macau	0	0	0	0	–
(Vietnam) 2009 Hanoi	0	1	1	2	30
Asian Martial Arts Games
(Thailand) 2009 Bangkok	2	1	3	6	17
Asian Indoor and Martial Arts Games
(South Korea) 2013 Incheon	0	0	3	3	25
(Turkmenistan) 2017 Ashgabat	1	0	5	6	28
Total	3	3	12	18	

=== Medals by Asian Beach Games ===
Games	Gold	Silver	Bronze	Total	Rank
(Indonesia) 2008 Bali	2	0	0	2	13
(Oman) 2010 Muscat	1	1	0	2	12
(China) 2012 Haiyang	0	0	0	0	–
(Thailand) 2014 Phuket	1	1	6	8	24
(Vietnam) 2016 Da Nang	0	1	2	3	30
Total	4	3	8	15	

=== Medals by Asian Youth Games ===
Games	Gold	Silver	Bronze	Total	Rank
2009 Singapore	0	0	0	0	–
(China) 2013 Nanjing	1	0	0	1	17
Total	1	0	0	1	

== Medals by sport ==
=== Asian Games ===
Sport	Gold	Silver	Bronze	Total
Weightlifting	3	0	0	3
Boxing	2	1	8	11
Swimming	2	1	1	4
Karate	1	2	2	5
Athletics	1	0	1	2
Wrestling	0	3	4	7
Bodybuilding	0	1	0	1
Totals (7 entries)	9	8	16	33

== List of flag bearers ==
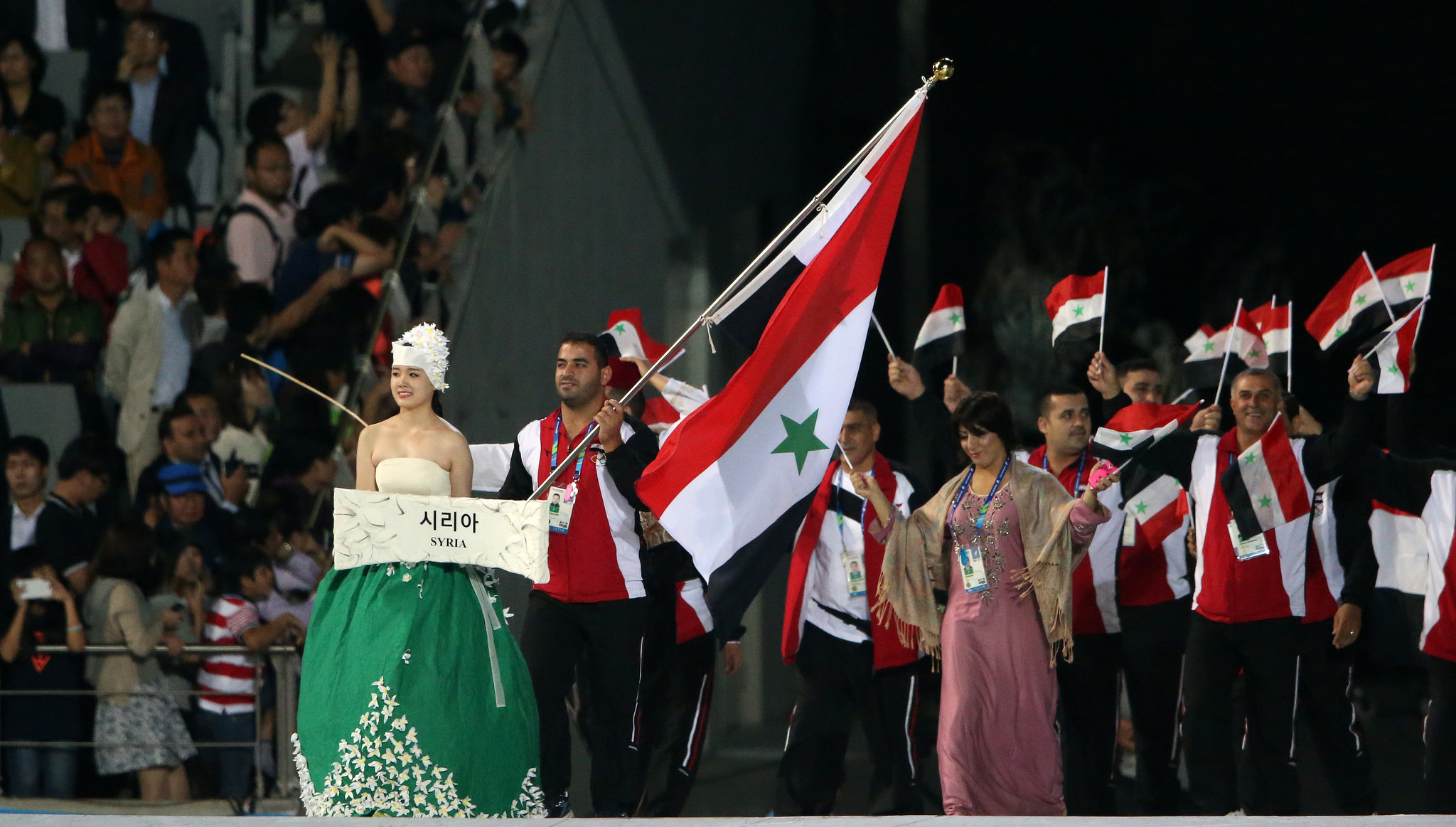
2014 Asian Games opening ceremony with Syrian flag bearer Ahed Joughili, weightlifter and multiple medalist.

Event year	Flag bearer	Sport
2006	Ahed Joughili	Weightlifting
2010	Ahed Joughili	Weightlifting
2014	Ahed Joughili	Weightlifting
2018	Abdulwahab Al-Hamwi	Basketball
2022	Ahmad Ghousoon	Boxing

- Since the 2006 Asian Games only

== See also ==
- Syria at the Olympics
- Syria at the Mediterranean Games
