= Vietnam at the Asian Games =

- IOC code: VIE
- NOC: Vietnam Olympic Committee
- Website: www.voc.org.vn (in Vietnamese and English)
- Medals Ranked 22nd: Gold 24 Silver 78 Bronze 131 Total 233

Summer appearances
- 1954; 1958; 1962; 1966; 1970; 1974; 1978; 1982; 1986; 1990; 1994; 1998; 2002; 2006; 2010; 2014; 2018; 2022; 2026

Winter appearances
- 2017; 2025; 2029

Vietnam first competed at the Asian Games in 1954 in Manila, Philippines as State of Vietnam. After the partition of Vietnam in July the same year, South Vietnam participated from 1958 to 1970. North Vietnam and South Vietnam merged in 1975 and the reunified Vietnam team started competing from 1982 onward. In total, Vietnamese athletes have won 17 gold medals and 180 medals overall at the Asian Games.

== Asian Games ==
=== Medals by Games ===
Games	Rank	Gold	Silver	Bronze	Total	Team
(India) 1951 New Delhi	did not participate					
(Philippines) 1954 Manila	—N/a	0	0	0	0	State of Vietnam
(Japan) 1958 Tokyo	8	2	0	4	6	South Vietnam
(Indonesia) 1962 Jakarta	13	0	0	1	1	South Vietnam
(Thailand) 1966 Bangkok	15	0	1	1	2	South Vietnam
(Thailand) 1970 Bangkok	16	0	0	2	2	South Vietnam
(Iran) 1974 Tehran	did not participate					
(Thailand) 1978 Bangkok	did not participate					
(India) 1982 New Delhi	19	0	0	1	1	Vietnam
(South Korea) 1986 Seoul	did not participate					
(China) 1990 Beijing	—N/a	0	0	0	0	Vietnam
(Japan) 1994 Hiroshima	19	1	2	0	3	Vietnam
(Thailand) 1998 Bangkok	22	1	5	11	17	Vietnam
(South Korea) 2002 Busan	15	4	7	7	18	Vietnam
(Qatar) 2006 Doha	19	3	13	7	23	Vietnam
(China) 2010 Guangzhou	24	1	17	15	33	Vietnam
(South Korea) 2014 Incheon	21	1	10	25	36	Vietnam
(Indonesia) 2018 Jakarta-Palembang	16	5	15	19	39	Vietnam
(China) 2022 Hangzhou	21	3	5	19	27	Vietnam
(Japan) 2026 Nagoya	20	3	3	19	25	Vietnam
(Qatar) 2030 Doha	Future event					
(Saudi Arabia) 2034 Riyadh	Future event					
Total	8	2	1	8	11	
Total	15	24	78	131	233	
Total	8	26	79	139	244	

== Asian Winter Games ==
=== Medals by Games ===
Games	Rank	Gold	Silver	Bronze	Total
(Japan) Sapporo 1986	did not participate				
(Japan) Sapporo 1990	did not participate				
(China) Harbin 1996	did not participate				
(South Korea) Gangwon 1999	did not participate				
(Japan) Aomori 2003	did not participate				
(China) Changchun 2007	did not participate				
(Kazakhstan) Astana-Almaty 2011	did not participate				
(Japan) 2017 Sapporo	—N/a	0	0	0	0
(China) Harbin 2025	—N/a	0	0	0	0
(Kazakhstan) Astana 2029	Future event				
Total		0	0	0	0

== Asian Para Games ==
=== Medals by Games ===
Games	Rank	Gold	Silver	Bronze	Total
(China) 2010 Guangzhou	11	3	4	10	17
(South Korea) 2014 Incheon	10	9	7	13	29
(Indonesia) 2018 Jakarta	12	8	8	24	40
(China) 2022 Hangzhou	22	1	10	9	20
(Japan) 2026 Nagoya					
Total	11	21	29	56	106

== Asian Beach Games ==
*Red border color indicates tournament was held on home soil.

=== Medals by Games ===
Games	Rank	Gold	Silver	Bronze	Total
(Indonesia) 2008 Bali	8	2	5	3	10
(Oman) 2010 Muscat	14	0	5	3	8
(China) 2012 Haiyang	12	0	2	1	3
(Thailand) 2014 Phuket	5	8	12	20	40
(Vietnam) 2016 Danang	1	52	44	43	139
Total	2	62	68	70	200

== Asian Indoor and Martial Arts Games ==
*Red border color indicates tournament was held on home soil.

=== Medals by Games ===
Games	Rank	Gold	Silver	Bronze	Total
Asian Indoor Games
(Thailand) 2005 Bangkok	21	0	1	1	2
2007 Macau	13	2	5	11	18
(Vietnam) 2009 Hanoi	2	42	30	22	94
Asian Martial Arts Games
(Thailand) 2009 Bangkok	6	7	11	21	39
Asian Indoor and Martial Arts Games
(South Korea) 2013 Incheon	3	8	7	12	27
(Turkmenistan) 2017 Ashgabat	9	13	8	19	40
Total	6	72	62	86	220

== Asian Youth Games ==
=== Medals by Games ===
Games	Rank	Gold	Silver	Bronze	Total
2009 Singapore	14	0	2	0	2
(China) 2013 Nanjing	7	5	4	2	11
(Bahrain) 2025 Manama	22	1	7	11	19
Total	15	6	13	13	32

== Asian Youth Para Games ==
=== Medals by Games ===
Games	Rank	Gold	Silver	Bronze	Total
(Japan) 2009 Tokyo	did not participate				
(Malaysia) 2013 Kuala Lumpur	6	16	4	3	23
2017 Singapore	16	3	5	2	10
(Bahrain) 2021 Manama	did not participate				
Total	13	19	9	5	33
