= Singapore at the Asian Games =

- IOC code: SGP
- NOC: Singapore National Olympic Council
- Website: www.singaporeolympics.com (in English)
- Medals Ranked 17th: Gold 46 Silver 74 Bronze 130 Total 250

Summer appearances
- 1951; 1954; 1958; 1962; 1966; 1970; 1974; 1978; 1982; 1986; 1990; 1994; 1998; 2002; 2006; 2010; 2014; 2018; 2022; 2026

Winter appearances
- 2011; 2017; 2025; 2029

Singapore at the Asian Para Games
- IPC code: SGP
- NPC: Singapore National Paralympic Council
- Website: www.snpc.org.sg (in English)
- Medals: Gold 7 Silver 6 Bronze 15 Total 28

Asian Para Games appearances (overview)
- 2010; 2014; 2018; 2022

Singapore has competed in all editions of the Asian Games since it was first held in 1951, one of only seven countries to do so. The country abbreviation is SGP.

The Singapore National Olympic Council (SNOC) is the body in Singapore responsible for selecting athletes to represent Singapore at the Asian Games. The SNOC is a member of the Asian Games Federation.

== Overall medal tally ==
With 232 medals, Singapore is currently seventeenth in the all-time tally of medals.

Games	Year	Host	Dates	Gold	Silver	Bronze	Total
1951	I	New Delhi, India	4 – 11 March	5	7	2	14
1954	II	Manila, Philippines	1 – 9 May	1	4	4	9
1958	III	Tokyo, Japan	28 May – 1 June	1	1	1	3
1962	IV	Jakarta, Indonesia	24 August – 4 September	1	0	2	3
1966	V	Bangkok, Thailand	9 – 20 December	0	5	7	12
1970	VI	Bangkok, Thailand	24 August – 4 September	0	6	9	15
1974	VII	Tehran, Iran	1 – 16 September	1	3	7	11
1978	VIII	Bangkok, Thailand	9 – 20 December	2	1	4	7
1982	IX	New Delhi, India	19 November – 4 December	1	0	2	3
1986	X	Seoul, South Korea	20 September – 5 October	0	1	4	5
1990	XI	Beijing, China	22 September – 7 October	0	1	4	5
1994	XII	Hiroshima, Japan	2 – 16 October	1	1	5	7
1998	XIII	Bangkok, Thailand	6 – 20 December	2	3	9	14
2002	XIV	Busan, South Korea	29 September – 14 October	5	2	10	17
2006	XV	Doha, Qatar	1 – 15 December	8	7	12	27
2010	XVI	Guangzhou, China	12 – 27 November	4	7	6	17
2014	XVII	Incheon, South Korea	19 September – 4 October	5	6	14	25
2018	XVIII	Jakarta and Palembang, Indonesia	18 August – 2 September	4	4	14	22
2022	XIX	Hangzhou, China	23 September – 8 October	3	6	7	16
2026	XX	Aichi and Nagoya, Japan	19 September – 4 October	2	9	7	18
Total				46	74	130	250

=== Medals by Summer Sport ===
Leading in that sport

Sport	Gold	Silver	Bronze	Total
Sailing	16	13	21	50
Swimming	12	17	33	62
Bowling	6	9	9	24
Athletics	3	8	9	20
Bodybuilding	3	2	3	8
Water polo	1	3	3	7
Weightlifting	1	3	2	6
Shooting	1	1	4	6
Bridge	1	0	2	3
Table tennis	0	2	9	11
Pencak silat	0	2	3	5
Wushu	0	1	7	8
Cue sports	0	1	2	3
Boxing	0	1	1	2
Canoeing	0	1	1	2
Ju-jitsu	0	1	0	1
Sepaktakraw	0	0	8	8
Fencing	0	0	2	2
Squash	0	0	2	2
Badminton	0	0	1	1
Xiangqi	0	0	1	1
Totals (21 entries)	44	65	123	232

== Asian Para Games ==
Games	Year	Host	Dates	Gold	Silver	Bronze	Total
2010	I	Guangzhou, China	13 – 19 December	0	0	4	4
2014	II	Incheon, South Korea	18 – 24 October	1	1	4	6
2018	III	Jakarta, Indonesia	6 – 13 October	3	2	5	10
2022	IV	Hangzhou, China	22 – 28 October	3	3	2	8
Total				7	6	15	28
