= Kyrgyzstan at the Asian Games =

- IOC code: KGZ
- NOC: National Olympic Committee of the Republic of Kyrgyzstan
- Medals Ranked 26th: Gold 10 Silver 24 Bronze 47 Total 81

Summer appearances
- 1994; 1998; 2002; 2006; 2010; 2014; 2018; 2022; 2026

Winter appearances
- 1996; 1999; 2003; 2007; 2011; 2017; 2025; 2029

Kyrgyzstan first competed at the Asian Games in 1994.
