= Lebanon at the Asian Games =

- IOC code: LBN
- NOC: Lebanese Olympic Committee
- Medals Ranked 32nd: Gold 5 Silver 6 Bronze 11 Total 22

Summer appearances
- 1978; 1982; 1986; 1990; 1994; 1998; 2002; 2006; 2010; 2014; 2018; 2022; 2026

Winter appearances
- 1996; 1999; 2003; 2007; 2011; 2017; 2025; 2029

Lebanon first competed at the Asian Games in 1978.

== Medal tables ==
=== Medals by Asian Games ===
Medal	Name	Games	Sport	Event
Gold	Mohammed Anouti	2002 Busan	Bodybuilding	+90 kg
Gold	Jean Claude Rabbath	2006 Doha	Athletics	Men's long jump
Bronze	Talih Bou-Kamel; Joseph Hanna; Joe Salem	2006 Doha	Shooting	Men's Trap team
Bronze	Cosette Basbous	2006 Doha	Taekwondo	Women's −55 kg
Silver	Joseph Hanna; Abdo Al-Yazgie; Joe Salem	2010 Guangzhou	Shooting	Men's Trap team
Bronze	Joe Salem	2010 Guangzhou	Shooting	Men's Trap
Bronze	Andrea Paoli	2010 Guangzhou	Taekwondo	Women's −57 kg
Silver	Nacif Elias	2014 Incheon	Judo	Men's −81 kg
Bronze	Elias El-Hidari	2014 Incheon	Taekwondo	Men's +87 kg
