= Kazakhstan at the Asian Games =

- IOC code: KAZ
- NOC: National Olympic Committee of the Republic of Kazakhstan
- Medals Ranked 6th: Gold 177 Silver 204 Bronze 340 Total 721

Summer appearances
- 1994; 1998; 2002; 2006; 2010; 2014; 2018; 2022; 2026

Winter appearances
- 1996; 1999; 2003; 2007; 2011; 2017; 2025; 2029

Kazakhstan first competed at the Asian Games in 1994.

== Asian Games ==
=== Medals by Games ===
| Games | Rank | Gold | Silver | Bronze | Total |
|---|---|---|---|---|---|
| (Japan) 1994 Hiroshima | 4 | 27 | 25 | 27 | 79 |
| (Thailand) 1998 Bangkok | 5 | 24 | 24 | 30 | 78 |
| (South Korea) 2002 Busan | 4 | 20 | 26 | 30 | 76 |
| (Qatar) 2006 Doha | 4 | 23 | 20 | 42 | 85 |
| (China) 2010 Guangzhou | 5 | 18 | 23 | 38 | 79 |
| (South Korea) 2014 Incheon | 4 | 28 | 23 | 33 | 84 |
| (Indonesia) 2018 Jakarta & Palembang | 9 | 15 | 17 | 44 | 76 |
| (China) 2022 Hangzhou | 11 | 10 | 22 | 48 | 80 |
| (Japan) 2026 Nagoya | 8 | 12 | 24 | 48 | 84 |
| (Qatar) 2030 Doha | Future event | | | | |
| (Saudi Arabia) 2034 Riyadh | Future event | | | | |
| Total | 6 | 177 | 204 | 340 | 721 |

== Asian Winter Games ==
*Red border color indicates tournament was held on home soil.

=== Medals by Games ===
| Games | Rank | Gold | Silver | Bronze | Total |
| (China) 1996 Harbin | 2 | 14 | 9 | 8 | 31 |
| (South Korea) 1999 Gangwon | 3 | 10 | 8 | 7 | 25 |
| (Japan) 2003 Aomori | 4 | 7 | 7 | 6 | 20 |
| (China) 2007 Changchun | 4 | 6 | 6 | 6 | 18 |
| (Kazakhstan) 2011 Astana & Almaty | 1 | 32 | 21 | 17 | 70 |
| (Japan) 2017 Sapporo & Obihiro | 4 | 9 | 11 | 12 | 32 |
| (China) 2025 Harbin | 4 | 4 | 9 | 7 | 20 |
| (Kazakhstan) 2029 Almaty | Future event | | | | |
| Total | 4 | 82 | 71 | 63 | 216 |

== Asian Para Games ==
=== Medals by Games ===
| Games | Rank | Gold | Silver | Bronze | Total |
|---|---|---|---|---|---|
| (China) 2010 Guangzhou | 23 | 0 | 2 | 5 | 7 |
| (South Korea) 2014 Incheon | 11 | 7 | 6 | 11 | 24 |
| (Indonesia) 2018 Jakarta | 13 | 5 | 15 | 13 | 33 |
| (China) 2022 Hangzhou | 11 | 8 | 12 | 21 | 7 |
| Total | 13 | 25 | 35 | 50 | 105 |

== See also ==
- Kazakhstan at the Asian Winter Games
- Kazakhstan at the Asian Para Games
- Kazakhstan at the Olympics
- Kazakhstan at the Paralympics
