= Qatar at the Asian Games =

- IOC code: QAT
- NOC: Qatar Olympic Committee
- Medals Ranked 15th: Gold 54 Silver 43 Bronze 55 Total 152

Summer appearances
- 1978; 1982; 1986; 1990; 1994; 1998; 2002; 2006; 2010; 2014; 2018; 2022; 2026

Winter appearances
- 2011; 2017; 2025; 2029

Qatar first competed at the Asian Games in 1978.

== Medal tables ==
=== Medals by Asian Games ===
*Red border color indicates tournament was held on home soil.

Peach colour indicates best performance

Games	Rank	Gold	Silver	Bronze	Total
1978 Bangkok	20	0	0	0	0
1982 New Delhi	19	0	0	1	1
1986 Seoul	11	1	0	3	4
1990 Beijing	8	3	2	1	6
1994 Hiroshima	10	4	1	5	10
1998 Bangkok	18	2	3	3	8
2002 Busan	17	4	5	8	17
2006 Doha	9	9	12	11	32
2010 Guangzhou	18	4	4	7	15
2014 Incheon	10	10	0	4	14
2018 Jakarta / Palembang	15	6	4	3	13
2022 Hangzhou	15	5	6	3	14
2026 Aichi-Nagoya	14	6	6	6	18
2030 Doha	Future event				
2034 Riyadh	Future event				
Total	15	54	43	55	152
