= 2030 Asian Games =

Multi-sport event in Doha, Qatar

XXI Asian Games
- Host city: Doha, Qatar
- Motto: The Games We Live For (Arabic: ألعاب العمر)
- Opening: 4 November 2030
- Closing: 19 November 2030
- Opened by: Emir of Qatar (expected)
- Main venue: Khalifa International Stadium
- Website: agdoha2030.qa

Summer

Winter

The 2030 Asian Games (Arabic: دورة الألعاب الآسيوية 2030, romanized: Dawrat al-ʼAl‘ab al-Asīawīah 2030), officially known as the 21st Asian Games (Arabic: الـ21 من الآسياد, romanized: Al 21 mn-Alīsyad) and commonly known as Doha 2030 (Arabic: الدوحة 2030), will be the twenty-first edition of the Asian Games, a pan-Asian multi-sport event that is scheduled to be held from 4 to 19 November 2030 in Doha, Qatar.

Doha was elected as the host city at the 39th Olympic Council of Asia (OCA) General Assembly on 16 December 2020 in Muscat, Oman. These Games will be the second Asian Games to be held in Qatar, the second in Arabian Peninsula, and the first of two consecutive Asian Games in the Arabian Peninsula, with the following Games set to be the 2034 Asian Games in Riyadh, Saudi Arabia. Doha will be the fourth city to host the Asian Games twice, having previously hosted the 2006 Asian Games and will use again much of the infrastructure that was built for that event and the 2022 FIFA World Cup. This would be potentially a build up to the 2036 Summer Olympics (in which the city is actively bidding to host) if selected by the International Olympic Committee in 2029.

== Bidding process ==
The OCA voted on 16 December 2020 at the 39th OCA General Assembly in Muscat, Oman to select the host city. On 15 December 2020, OCA President Sheikh Ahmad Al-Fahad Al-Sabah announced that he would attempt to find a dual-host city solution to avoid a vote for the 2030 Asian Games, by persuading one city to host the event in 2030 and the other to organize the competition in 2034. On 16 December 2020, it was announced that Doha will host 2030 Games with the highest votes and Riyadh will host the 2034 Games. Saudi Arabia had asked the OCA to halt electronic voting on the host of the 2030 Asian Games due to "the possibility of technical fraud".

2030 Asian Games bidding results
City	NOC	Round 1	Result
Doha	Qatar	27	Awarded 2030 Asian Games
Riyadh	Saudi Arabia	10	Awarded 2034 Asian Games
Abstentions		8	

== Development and preparations ==
The sporting venues in Qatar already exist and have been used in past international sporting events, such as the FIFA World Cup 2022 and the 2006 Asian Games. Doha will stage a compact Games reliant on existing permanent venues and some temporary facilities around them.

In October 2026, a day before the 2026 Asian Games Closing Ceremony, Ahmad Abdulla Al-Buenain, chief executive of the Doha 2030 Asian Games Organising Committee, told reporters that they are open for the possibility of moving to 2031 to allow for the games to be a Olympic Qualifier Event in some sports. He also said that the OCA and the International Olympic Committee (IOC) were discussing the matter. IOC President Kirsty Coventry, who attended the Aichi-Nagoya Games, supports the idea as a way to strengthen the movement.

=== Proposed venues ===
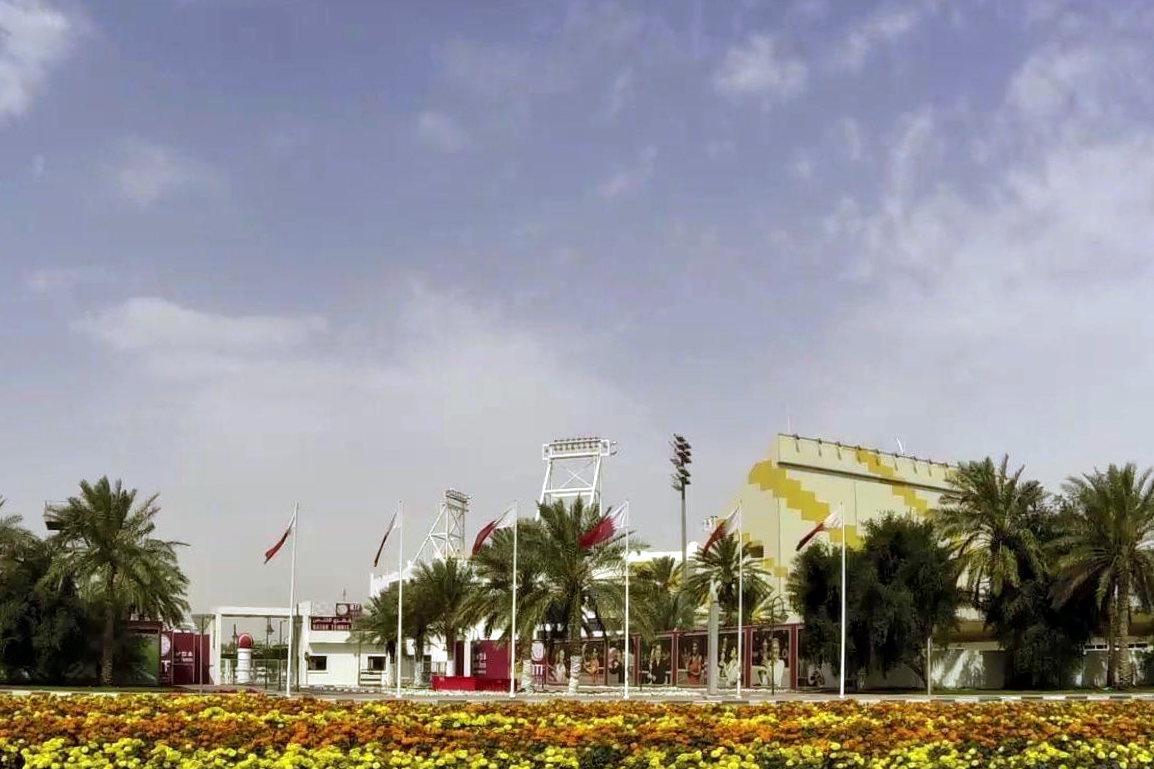
Khalifa Tennis and Squash International Sports Complex

Khalifa International Stadium

Qatar Foundation Stadium in the Qatar Foundation Sports Complex

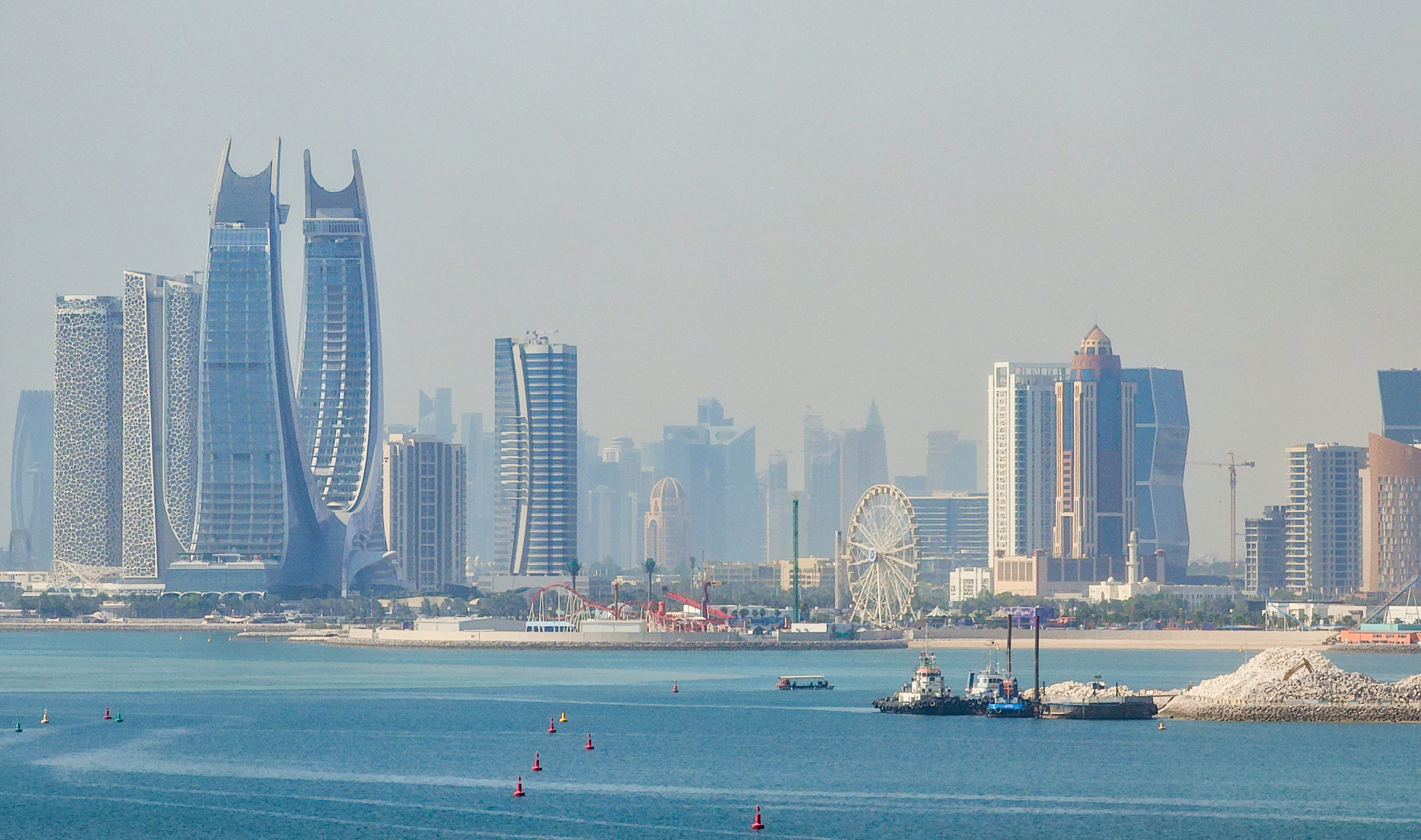
Lusail Marina Iconic

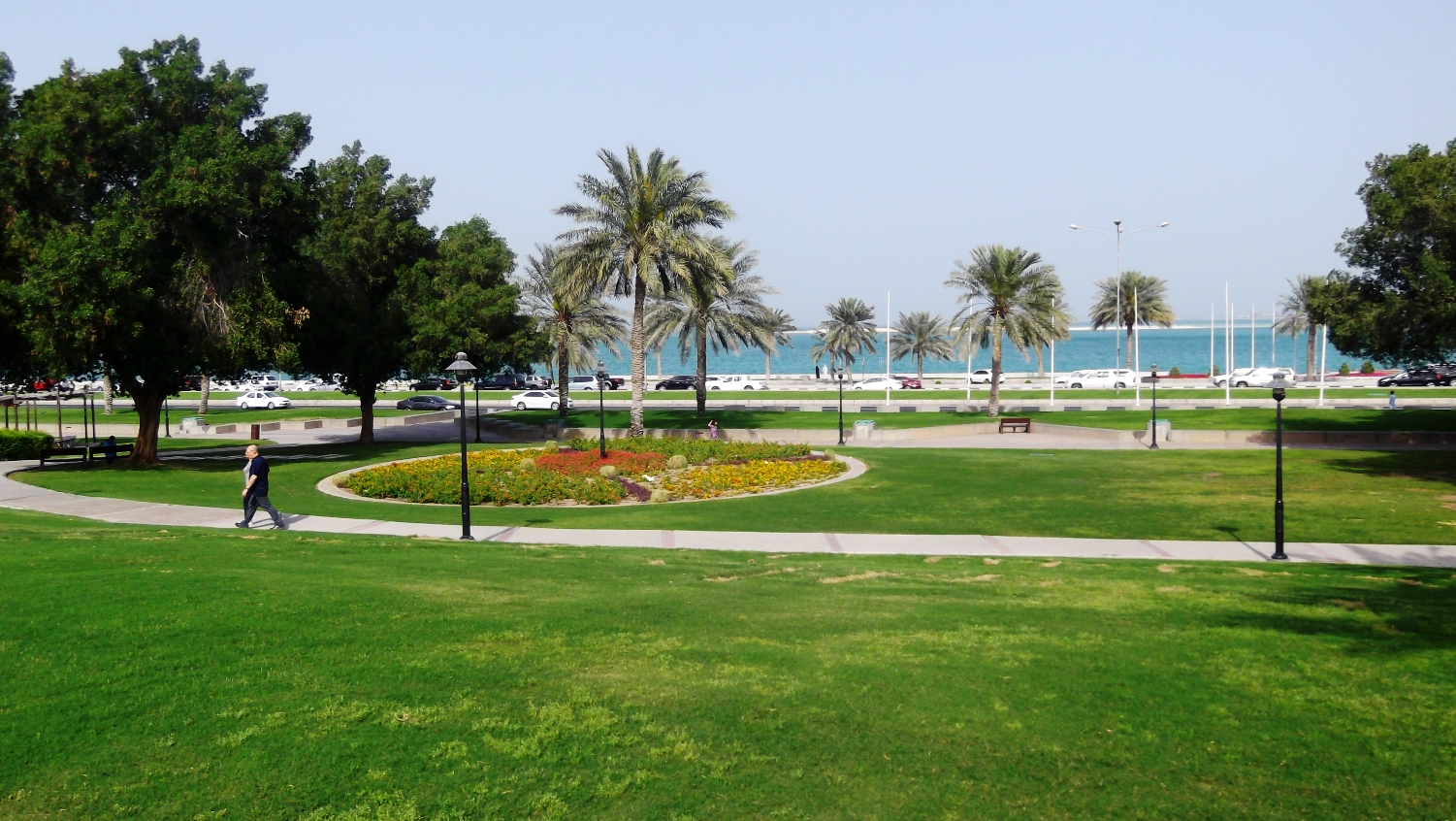
Al Bidda Park

Al Thumama Stadium

==== Qatar Foundation Campus ====
- Education City Stadium – football (preliminaries) / 20,000 existing
- Qatar Foundation Golf Course – golf / 1,000 existing
- Al Shaqab Equestrian Center – equestrian, modern pentathlon / 5,000 existing
- Qatar Foundation Recreation Centre – modern pentathlon / 6,000 (in total) existing
- Qatar National Convention Centre – cue sports (billiards), esports / 1,000 existing

==== Al Rayyan Sports Complex ====
- Indoor Hall – judo, kurash, wrestling / 3,000 existing
- Al Rayyan Baseball and Softball Centre – baseball, softball / 1,500 temporary
- Al Rayyan Hockey Centre – field hockey / 2,000 temporary
- Al Rayyan Stadium – football (preliminaries) / 15,300 existing

==== Lusail ====
- Lusail Stadium – football (preliminaries) / 40,000 existing
- Lusail Sports Arena – handball / 15,300 existing
- Lusail Shooting Range – shooting / 1,600 existing
- Lusail Archery Range – archery / 600 existing
- Lusail Marina – athletics (street events), cycling (road time trial), marathon swimming, triathlon / 500 temporary
- Canal – canoeing, rowing / 500 temporary
- Katara Cultural Village Marina – sailing / N/A temporary

==== Al Gharrafa Sports Complex ====
- Thani bin Jassim Stadium – rugby sevens / 21,175 existing
- Al Gharaffa Indoor Hall – sepak takraw / 3,000 existing
- Al Gharaffa Beach Handball Arenas – beach handball / 2,200 existing
- Al Gharaffa Beach Soccer Arenas – beach soccer / 1,300 existing
- Al Gharaffa Beach Tennis Arenas – beach tennis / 2,200 existing
- Al Gharaffa Beach Volleyball Arenas – beach volleyball / 1,300 existing

==== Al Sadd Sports Complex ====
- Ali Bin Hamad al-Attiyah Arena
  - basketball / 7,700 existing
  - 3x3 basketball / 3,000 temporary
- Al Sadd Swimming Pool – water polo (preliminaries)/ 1,000 existing

==== Aspire Zone, Al Rayyan ====
- Khalifa International Stadium – athletics (track and field), opening and closing ceremonies / 45,857 existing
- Khalifa International Tennis and Squash Complex
  - Tennis Courts – soft tennis, tennis / 7,000 (main court) existing
  - Squash Courts – squash / 1,000 (main court) existing
  - Padel Courts – padel / 1,500 (main court) existing
- Al Dana Indoor Hall – weightlifting / 1,000 existing
- Al Dana Banquet Hall – chess / 500 existing
- Hamad Aquatic Centre – artistic swimming, diving, swimming / 5,000 existing
- Aspire Dome
  - cycling (track) / 1,500 temporary
  - gymnastics / 4,900 existing
  - badminton, table tennis / 600 existing
  - kabaddi, karate, taekwondo / 1,000 existing
  - boxing, wushu / 600 existing
- Skateboarding Park – skateboarding / 500 existing
- Sports Climbing Park – sports climbing / 1,000 existing
- Basketball Hall – fencing, jiu-jitsu, mixed martial arts / 2,000 existing

==== Stand-alone venues ====
- Al Thumama Stadium – football (preliminaries) / 20,000 existing
- Doha Asian Town Stadium – cricket / 13,000 existing
- Al Janoub Stadium – football (preliminaries) / 20,000 existing
- Al Bayt Stadium – football (preliminaries) / 20,000 existing
- Duhail Handball Sports Hall – volleyball / 5,500 existing
- Al Bidda Park – beach volleyball / 350 existing

=== Athletes Village ===
The athletes' village will be located in Lusail.

== Torch and flag handover ==
At the closing ceremony of the 20th Asian Games Aichi-Nagoya 2026 on 4 October 2026, the torch from the first Asian Games in New Delhi in 1951 and the Olympic Council of Asia (OCA) flag from Aichi-Nagoya were handed over to Qatar. OCA President Sheikh Joaan bin Hamad Al Thani held the torch of the first-ever Asian Games while Qatari equestrian Jassim Al Kuwari and Qatari high jump legend and Olympic gold medalist Mutaz Barshim carried the OCA flag during the closing ceremony.

Preceded by Aichi and Nagoya	Asian Games; Doha; XXI Asian Games (2030)	Succeeded by Riyadh
