= Asian Paralympic Committee =

International regional committee representing Asia

- Logo of the Asian Paralympic Committee
- Abbreviation: APC
- Formation: 30 October 2002; 23 years ago
- Founded at: Busan, South Korea
- Type: Continental Sports Federation
- Headquarters: Dubai, United Arab Emirates
- Members: 45 Members
- Official language: English
- President: (United Arab Emirates) Majid Rashed
- Vice-Presidents: (South Korea) Jai-Jun Choung (Saudi Arabia) Abdulraheem Alsheikh (Uzbekistan) Mukhtorkhon Tashkhodjaev (Japan) Kazuhiro Yagi
- CEO: (United Arab Emirates) Tarek Souei
- Affiliations: International Paralympic Committee
- Website: AsianParalympic.org

The Asian Paralympic Committee (acronym: APC) is an organization based in United Arab Emirates. It has 45 National Paralympic Committees of the Asian continent as members. It organizes the Asian Para Games and is affiliated to the International Paralympic Committee.

== History ==
The Asian Paralympic Committee was formed on 30 October 2002 during the 2002 FESPIC Games in Busan, South Korea as the Asian Paralympic Council, following a motion presented by NPC Malaysia at the 1999 IPC General Assembly. It consisted originally of three sub-regions which are East Asia, South Asia and Southeast Asia. In April 2004, in order to align with the structure followed by the International Olympic Committee, the International Paralympic Committee decided that the Central Asia and West Asia sub-regions fall under the council's responsibility. An agreement was signed on 16 May 2004 to merge the Asian Paralympic Council and the FESPIC Federation. The organisation was only known by its present name by 28 November 2006 when the merger came into effect.

== Member countries ==
In the following table, the year in which the NPC was recognized by the International Paralympic Committee (IPC) is also given if it is different from the year in which the NPC was created.

Nation/Region	Code	National Paralympic Committee	Created	Ref.
Afghanistan	AFG	Afghanistan Paralympic Committee		
Bahrain	BRN	Bahrain Disabled Sports Federation-Bahrain Paralympic Committee		
Bangladesh	BAN	National Paralympic Committee of Bangladesh	Inactive	
Bhutan	BHU	Bhutan Paralympic Committee	2017	
Brunei	BRU	Paralympic Council of Brunei Darussalam		
Cambodia	CAM	National Paralympic Committee of Cambodia		
China	CHN	National Paralympic Committee of China		
Hong Kong	HKG	China Hong Kong Paralympic Committee		
India	IND	Paralympic Committee of India	1992	
Indonesia	INA	National Paralympic Committee of Indonesia	1962	
Iran	IRI	I. R. Iran National Paralympic Committee	2001	
Iraq	IRQ	Iraqi National Paralympic Committee		
Japan	JPN	Japan Paralympic Committee	1999	
Jordan	JOR	Jordan Paralympic Committee		
Kazakhstan	KAZ	National Paralympic Committee of Kazakhstan		
North Korea	PRK	Paralympic Committee of the Democratic People's Republic of Korea		
South Korea	KOR	Korean Paralympic Committee	2006	
Kuwait	KUW	Kuwait Paralympic Committee		
Kyrgyzstan	KGZ	National Paralympic Federation of the Kyrgyz Republic		
Laos	LAO	Lao Paralympic Committee		
Lebanon	LIB	Lebanese Paralympic Committee		
Macau	MAC	Macau Paralympic Committee - Recreation and Sports Association for the Disabled	1979	
Malaysia	MAS	Paralympic Council Malaysia	1989	
Maldives	MDV	Maldives Paralympic Committee	2019	
Mongolia	MGL	Mongolian Paralympic Committee	1995	
Myanmar	MYA	Myanmar Paralympic Sports Federation	1989	
Nepal	NEP	National Paralympic Committee Nepal	2000	
Oman	OMA	Oman Paralympic Committee		
Pakistan	PAK	National Paralympic Committee of Pakistan	1998	
Palestine	PLE	Palestinian Paralympic Committee	2010	
Philippines	PHI	Paralympic Committee of the Philippines	1997	
Qatar	QAT	Qatar Paralympic Committee		
Saudi Arabia	KSA	Paralympic Committee of Saudi Arabia		
Singapore	SGP	Singapore National Paralympic Council	2008	
Sri Lanka	SRI	National Federation of Sports for the Disabled		
Syria	SYR	Syrian Paralympic Committee		
Chinese Taipei	TPE	Chinese Taipei Paralympic Committee		
Tajikistan	TJK	Tajik Paralympic Committee		
Thailand	THA	Paralympic Committee of Thailand	1985	
Timor-Leste	TLS	National Paralympic Committee of Timor-Leste	2003	
Turkmenistan	TKM	National Paralympic Committee of Turkmenistan		
United Arab Emirates	UAE	UAE Paralympic Committee		
Uzbekistan	UZB	National Paralympic Committee of Uzbekistan		
Vietnam	VIE	Vietnam Paralympic Association		
Yemen	YEM	Yemen Paralympic Association	2015	

== Regions ==
45 in 5 regions:

1. East (8)
2. Center (6)
3. West (12)
4. South (8)
5. South East (11)

== Events ==
- Asian Para Games
- Asian Youth Para Games

Related:

- West Asian Para Games
- ASEAN Para Games
- FESPIC Games
- FESPIC Youth Games

== APC Recognized Sports ==
27 Sports in 1 January 2024.

1. Para Archery - Asian Archery Federation (AAF)
2. Para Athletics - World Para Athletics (WPA)
3. Para Badminton - Badminton Asia Confederation (BAC)
4. Boccia - Boccia International Sports Federation (BISFed)
5. Wheelchair Basketball - International Wheelchair Basketball Federation (IWBF)
6. Tenpin Bowling - Asian Bowling Federation (ABF)
7. Para Canoeing - Asian Canoe Confederation (ACC)
8. Chess - Asian Chess Federation (ACF)
9. Para Cycling - Asian Cycling Confederation (ACC)
10. Wheelchair Dance Sport - Dance Sport Asia (DSA)
11. Blind Football - International Blind Sports Federation (IBSA)
12. CP Football - International Federation of Cerebral Palsy Football (IFCPF)
13. Go - International Go Federation (IGF)
14. Goalball - International Blind Sports Federation (IBSA)
15. Paralympic judo - International Blind Sports Federation (IBSA)
16. Lawn Bowls - World Bowls (WB)
17. Para Powerlifting - World Para Powerlifting (WPPO)
18. Rowing - World Rowing Federation (FISA)
19. Para Sailing - World Sailing (WS)
20. Para Shooting - International Paralympic Committee (IPC)
21. Para Swimming - International Paralympic Committee (IPC)
22. Para Table Tennis - International Table Tennis Federation (ITTF)
23. Sitting Volleyball - World ParaVolley (WPV)
24. Wheelchair Fencing - International Wheelchair and Amputee Sports Federation (IWAS)
25. Wheelchair Rugby - World Wheelchair Rugby (IWRF)
26. Wheelchair Tennis - International Tennis Federation (ITF)
27. Para Taekwondo - Asian Taekwondo Union (ATU)

== Events Summary ==
#	Games	Host	Nations	Competitors	Sports	Events	Champion
1	2009 Asian Youth Para Games (1)	Japan	24	466	5	219	Japan
2	2010 Asian Para Games (1)	China	41	2,405	19	341	China
3	2013 Asian Youth Para Games (2)	Malaysia	29	723	14	235	Japan
4	2014 Asian Para Games (2)	South Korea	41	2,497	23	443	China
5	2017 Asian Youth Para Games (1)	United Arab Emirates	30	800	7	252	Japan
6	2018 Asian Para Games (1)	Indonesia	43	2,757	18	506	China
7	2021 Asian Youth Para Games (1)	Bahrain	30	750	9	198	Iran
8	2022 Asian Para Games (1)	China	44	3,100	22	501	China

- Asian Summer Para Games (2010–2022) (4) 1,791 Events
- Asian Youth Para Games (2009–2021) (4) 904 Events
- Total : 8 Games (2009–2022): 2,695 Events

== Medals (2009–2023) ==
1. Asian Summer Para Games (2010–2022) (4 Edition) 1,791 Events
2. Asian Youth Para Games (2009–2021) (4 Edition) 904 Events

Rank	Nation	Gold	Silver	Bronze	Total
1	China (CHN)	820	490	345	1,655
2	Japan (JPN)	334	293	317	944
3	Iran (IRI)	295	298	241	834
4	South Korea (KOR)	234	219	242	695
5	Thailand (THA)	172	203	239	614
6	Uzbekistan (UZB)	122	69	64	255
7	Indonesia (INA)	112	116	133	361
8	Hong Kong (HKG)	83	94	108	285
9	Malaysia (MAS)	80	103	124	307
10	India (IND)	77	103	135	315
11	Iraq (IRQ)	67	59	69	195
12	Kazakhstan (KAZ)	45	67	68	180
13	Vietnam (VIE)	40	38	61	139
14	Chinese Taipei (TPE)	34	41	67	142
15	United Arab Emirates (UAE)	29	39	21	89
16	Jordan (JOR)	24	15	13	52
17	Philippines (PHI)	22	28	32	82
18	Saudi Arabia (KSA)	20	21	33	74
19	Singapore (SIN)	20	20	22	62
20	Sri Lanka (SRI)	15	26	26	67
21	Kuwait (KUW)	9	20	13	42
22	Pakistan (PAK)	9	3	11	23
23	Bahrain (BHR)	5	15	9	29
24	Oman (OMA)	5	11	3	19
25	Mongolia (MGL)	5	8	17	30
26	Myanmar (MYA)	4	9	15	28
27	Palestine (PLE)	3	3	1	7
28	Qatar (QAT)	3	1	3	7
29	Syria (SYR)	2	8	12	22
30	Timor-Leste (TLS)	2	1	1	4
31	Brunei (BRU)	1	2	4	7
32	Kyrgyzstan (KGZ)	1	2	1	4
33	Nepal (NEP)	1	1	2	4
34	Laos (LAO)	1	0	0	1
35	Lebanon (LBN)	0	5	1	6
36	Macau (MAC)	0	3	6	9
37	North Korea (PRK)	0	3	3	6
38	Turkmenistan (TKM)	0	2	4	6
39	Korea (COR)	0	1	1	2
40	Cambodia (CAM)	0	1	0	1
41	Tajikistan (TJK)	0	0	3	3
42	Yemen (YEM)	0	0	2	2
Totals (42 entries)		2,696	2,441	2,472	7,609

== Administration ==
=== APC Presidents ===
No.	Name	NPC	Term
1.	Zainal Abu Zarin	Malaysia	30 October 2002 – 3 December 2014
2.	Majid Rashed	United Arab Emirates	3 December 2014 – present

=== Executive board ===
Following is the APC Executive Board for the term 2019 – 2023.

Designation	Name	NPC
President	Majid Rashed	United Arab Emirates
Vice-presidents	Masayuki Mizuno	Japan
Vice-presidents	Ms. Zhao Su-jing	China
Vice-presidents	Ms. Jang Hyang Sook	South Korea
Member at Large	Abdulraheem Al-Sheikh	Saudi Arabia
Member at Large	Keng Chuan Ng	Malaysia
Chairperson of APC Athletes' Committee	Jeong Min Lee	South Korea
Chairperson of APC Women in Sports Committee	Ms. Nasanbat Oyunbat	Mongolia
Chairperson of APC Medical and Sports Science Committee	Dr. Hasuk Bae	South Korea
Chairperson of APC Games and Sports Development Committee	Ms. Lesley Fung	Hong Kong
Sub-Regional Representatives
South-East Asia	Michael Barredo	Philippines
West Asia	Abdelrazzaq Banirasheed	United Arab Emirates
Central Asia	Dr. Rustam Babayev	Kazakhstan
East Asia	Manabu Aso	Japan
South Asia	Imran Shami	Pakistan
CEO	Tarek Souei	United Arab Emirates

=== Committees ===
Committee	Chairperson	NPC
APC Athletes' Committee	Jeong Min Lee	South Korea
APC Women in Sports Committee	Ms. Nasanbat Oyunbat	Mongolia
APC Legal and Ethics Committee	Keng Chuan Ng	Malaysia
APC Medical and Sports Science Committee	Dr. Hasuk Bae	South Korea
APC Games and Sports Development Committee	Ms. Lesley Fung	Hong Kong

== Events organized ==
- Asian Para Games
- Asian Youth Para Games

== Affiliated event ==
- ASEAN Para Games

== See also ==
- Olympic Council of Asia
