= All-time Asian Para Games medal table =

Below is the all-time medal table for Summer Asian Para Games from 2010 to 2026. This does not include the medals won at the other events hosted by the Asian Paralympic Committee.

== Games ==
Number	Events (2290)	Gold	Silver	Bronze	Total
1 – 2010	341	341	338	341	1020
2 – 2014	443	443	433	469	1345
3 – 2018	506	507	497	537	1541
4 – 2022	501	502	499	572	1573
5 – 2026	489	490	486	562	1538
Total		2283	2253	2481	7017

== Medals ==
=== NPCs with medals ===
Team (IPC code)	No. Games	Gold	Silver	Bronze	Total
Bahrain (BRN)	4	1	6	4	11
Brunei (BRU)	3	0	2	4	6
Brunei (BRU)	5	0	0	1	1
Cambodia (CAM)	5	0	0	1	1
China (CHN)	5	937	583	445	1952
Chinese Taipei (TPE)	5	22	37	70	129
Hong Kong (HKG)	5	37	69	102	208
India (IND)	5	76	109	156	341
Indonesia (INA)	5	91	114	148	353
Iran (IRI)	5	185	201	184	570
Iraq (IRQ)	5	28	32	48	108
Japan (JPN)	5	221	267	292	780
Jordan (JOR)	5	11	9	9	29
Kazakhstan (KAZ)	5	32	51	61	144
Korea (COR)	1	0	1	1	2
Kuwait (KUW)	5	2	8	10	20
Kyrgyzstan (KGZ)	4	2	2	2	6
Laos (LAO)	5	1	0	0	1
Lebanon (LIB)	5	0	3	1	4
Macau (MAC)	5	0	2	4	6
Malaysia (MAS)	5	48	68	93	209
Mongolia (MGL)	5	10	11	22	43
Myanmar (MYA)	5	1	6	14	21
Nepal (NEP)	5	0	0	1	1
Oman (OMA)	5	4	8	3	15
North Korea (PRK)	3	0	2	2	2
Pakistan (PAK)	5	5	2	3	10
Palestine (PLE)	4	1	0	1	2
Philippines (PHI)	5	22	23	27	62
Qatar (QAT)	5	3	3	4	10
Saudi Arabia (KSA)	5	15	20	9	44
Singapore (SGP)	5	7	11	20	27
South Korea (KOR)	5	211	221	229	661
Sri Lanka (SRI)	5	11	22	24	57
Syria (SYR)	5	1	7	12	20
Thailand (THA)	5	110	172	257	539
Timor-Leste (TLS)	5	2	1	1	3
Turkmenistan (TKM)	3	0	2	4	6
Tajikistan (TJK)	5	0	1	0	0
United Arab Emirates (UAE)	5	15	30	20	65
Uzbekistan (UZB)	5	126	104	106	336
Vietnam (VIE)	5	22	30	58	110
Yemen (YEM)	4	0	0	1	1
Totals	5	1,291	1,269	1,347	3,907

=== NPCs without medals ===
Team (IPC code)	No. Games
Afghanistan (AFG)	5
Bangladesh (BAN)	3
Bhutan (BHU)	3
Maldives (MDV)	2

== Ranked medal table ==
Rank	Nation	Gold	Silver	Bronze	Total
1	China (CHN)	952	585	446	1,983
2	Japan (JPN)	221	267	292	780
3	South Korea (KOR)	211	221	230	662
4	Iran (IRI)	187	201	183	571
5	Uzbekistan (UZB)	126	104	106	336
6	Thailand (THA)	110	176	257	543
7	Indonesia (INA)	91	114	148	353
8	India (IND)	76	109	156	341
9	Malaysia (MAS)	54	77	102	233
10	Hong Kong (HKG)	37	69	102	208
11	Kazakhstan (KAZ)	32	51	73	156
12	Iraq (IRQ)	28	32	48	108
13	Chinese Taipei (TPE)	22	37	70	129
14	Vietnam (VIE)	22	31	57	110
15	Philippines (PHI)	22	23	27	72
16	United Arab Emirates (UAE)	17	29	22	68
17	Saudi Arabia (KSA)	15	20	9	44
18	Sri Lanka (SRI)	11	22	25	58
19	Jordan (JOR)	11	9	9	29
20	Mongolia (MGL)	9	11	19	39
21	Singapore (SIN)	7	13	20	40
22	Pakistan (PAK)	5	2	3	10
23	Oman (OMA)	4	8	2	14
24	Qatar (QAT)	3	3	5	11
25	Kuwait (KUW)	2	8	12	22
26	Timor-Leste (TLS)	2	3	1	6
27	Kyrgyzstan (KGZ)	2	2	1	5
28	Syria (SYR)	1	7	12	20
29	Myanmar (MYA)	1	6	16	23
30	Bahrain (BHR)	1	6	7	14
31	Palestine (PLE)	1	0	1	2
32	Laos (LAO)	1	0	0	1
33	Lebanon (LBN)	0	3	1	4
34	Brunei (BRU)	0	2	4	6
34	Macau (MAC)	0	2	4	6
34	Turkmenistan (TKM)	0	2	4	6
37	North Korea (PRK)	0	1	4	5
38	Korea (COR)	0	1	1	2
39	Tajikistan (TJK)	0	1	0	1
40	Cambodia (CAM)	0	0	1	1
40	Nepal (NEP)	0	0	1	1
40	Yemen (YEM)	0	0	1	1
Totals (42 entries)		2,284	2,258	2,482	7,024

== See also ==
- All-time Asian Games medal table
- All-time Asian Winter Games medal table
