= All-time Asian Winter Games medal table =

The total medal count for all Asian Winter Games from 1986 Asian Winter Games in Sapporo, Japan to 2025 Asian Winter Games in Harbin, China is tabulated below.

== NOCs with medals ==
Team (IOC code)	No. Games	Gold	Silver	Bronze	Total
Japan (JPN)	9	148	156	130	434
China (CHN)	9	126	112	131	369
South Korea (KOR)	9	90	98	106	294
Kazakhstan (KAZ)	7	82	71	63	216
Uzbekistan (UZB)	7	2	2	4	8
North Korea (PRK)	7	1	5	12	18
Lebanon (LBN)	7	1	1	0	2
Philippines (PHI)	5	1	0	0	1
Mongolia (MGL)	9	0	1	6	7
Iran (IRI)	8	0	1	2	3
Chinese Taipei (TPE)	8	0	0	1	1
Kyrgyzstan (KGZ)	7	0	0	1	1
Thailand (THA)	5	0	0	1	1
Totals	9	451	447	457	1355

== NOCs without medals ==
Team (IOC code)	No. Games
Afghanistan (AFG)	3
Bahrain (BRN)	2
Cambodia (CAM)	1
Hong Kong (HKG)	7
India (IND)	9
Indonesia (INA)	2
Jordan (JOR)	4
Kuwait (KUW)	6
Macau (MAC)	3
Malaysia (MAS)	4
Nepal (NEP)	5
Pakistan (PAK)	6
Palestine (PLE)	3
Qatar (QAT)	3
Saudi Arabia (KSA)	1
Singapore (SGP)	3
Sri Lanka (SRI)	2
Tajikistan (TJK)	6
Timor-Leste (TLS)	1
Turkmenistan (TKM)	2
United Arab Emirates (UAE)	4
Vietnam (VIE)	2

Australia (AUS) and New Zealand (NZL) were invited to participate at the 2017 Asian Winter Games, however those athletes were not eligible to win any medals, as they were classified as guest competitors.

== Ranked medal table ==
Rank	Nation	Gold	Silver	Bronze	Total
1	Japan (JPN)	148	156	130	434
2	China (CHN)	126	112	131	369
3	South Korea (KOR)	90	98	106	294
4	Kazakhstan (KAZ)	82	71	63	216
5	Uzbekistan (UZB)	2	2	4	8
6	North Korea (PRK)	1	5	12	18
7	Lebanon (LBN)	1	1	0	2
8	Philippines (PHI)	1	0	0	1
9	Mongolia (MGL)	0	1	6	7
10	Iran (IRI)	0	1	2	3
11	Chinese Taipei (TPE)	0	0	1	1
11	Kyrgyzstan (KGZ)	0	0	1	1
11	Thailand (THA)	0	0	1	1
Totals (13 entries)		451	447	457	1,355

== See also ==
- All-time Asian Games medal table (Summer Games)
- All-time Asian Para Games medal table
