= Table tennis at the Asian Para Games =

Table tennis events have been contested at every Asian Para Games since 2010 Asian Games in Guangzhou.

== Editions ==
Games	Year	Host city	Best nation	Events
1	2010	Guangzhou, China	China	20
2	2014	Incheon, South Korea	China	28
3	2018	Jakarta, Indonesia	China	42
4	2022	Hangzhou, China	China	36
5	2026	Toyota, Japan	China	27

== Medal table ==
Rank	Nation	Gold	Silver	Bronze	Total
1	China (CHN)	67	27	31	125
2	South Korea (KOR)	24	36	25	85
3	Thailand (THA)	7	11	25	43
4	Indonesia (INA)	7	5	17	29
5	Japan (JPN)	6	6	17	29
6	Hong Kong (HKG)	3	7	18	28
7	Chinese Taipei (TPE)	2	10	16	28
8	Malaysia (MAS)	1	0	5	6
9	Iraq (IRQ)	1	0	2	3
10	Philippines (PHI)	0	3	1	4
11	Iran (IRI)	0	2	4	6
12	Jordan (JOR)	0	2	2	4
12	Macau (MAC)	0	2	2	4
14	Saudi Arabia (KSA)	0	2	0	2
15	India (IND)	0	1	7	8
16	North Korea (PRK)	0	1	1	2
17	Korea (COR)	0	1	0	1
17	Kuwait (KUW)	0	1	0	1
17	Sri Lanka (SRI)	0	1	0	1
20	Vietnam (VIE)	0	0	4	4
21	Kazakhstan (KAZ)	0	0	3	3
22	Timor-Leste (TLS)	0	0	1	1
Totals (22 entries)		118	118	181	417

== Medalists ==
=== Men's Singles ===
Class 1

Event	Gold	Silver	Bronze
2010 Guangzhou; Class 1-3	Feng Panfeng; China	Kim Young-gun; South Korea	Ko Hang Yee; Hong Kong
2018 Jakarta	Nam Ki-won; South Korea	Hamed Latif; Kuwait	No bronze medalist
2022 Hangzhou	Joo Young-dae; South Korea	Nam Ki-won; South Korea	Sandeep Dangi; India

Class 2

Event	Gold	Silver	Bronze
2014 Incheon	Kim Min-gyu; South Korea	Hassan Janfeshan; Iran	Cha Soo-yong; South Korea
2014 Incheon	Kim Min-gyu; South Korea	Hassan Janfeshan; Iran	Ali Ranjbar; Iran
2018 Jakarta	Park Jin-cheol; South Korea	Cha Soo-yong; South Korea	Gao Yanming; China
2018 Jakarta	Park Jin-cheol; South Korea	Cha Soo-yong; South Korea	Hassan Janfeshan; Iran
2022 Hangzhou	Park Jin-cheol; South Korea	Cha Soo-yong; South Korea	Thirayu Chueawong; Thailand
2022 Hangzhou	Park Jin-cheol; South Korea	Cha Soo-yong; South Korea	Hassan Janfeshan; Iran

Class 3

Event	Gold	Silver	Bronze
2014 Incheon	Feng Panfeng; China	Osama Abu Jame; Jordan	Kim Jin-sung; South Korea
2014 Incheon	Feng Panfeng; China	Osama Abu Jame; Jordan	Zhai Xiang; China
2018 Jakarta	Feng Panfeng; China	Yuttajak Glinbancheun; Thailand	Guo Fei; China
2018 Jakarta	Feng Panfeng; China	Yuttajak Glinbancheun; Thailand	Ko Hang Yee; Hong Kong
2022 Hangzhou	Feng Panfeng; China	Yuttajak Glinbancheun; Thailand	Jang Yeong-jin; South Korea
2022 Hangzhou	Feng Panfeng; China	Yuttajak Glinbancheun; Thailand	Zhai Xiang; China

Class 4

Event	Gold	Silver	Bronze
2010 Guangzhou	Cao Ningning; China	Kim Jung-gil; South Korea	Zhang Yan; China
2014 Incheon	Kim Young-gun; South Korea	Choi Il-sang; South Korea	Zhang Yan; China
2014 Incheon	Kim Young-gun; South Korea	Choi Il-sang; South Korea	Kim Jung-gil; South Korea
2018 Jakarta	Kim Young-gun; South Korea	Kimg Jung-gil; South Korea	Zhang Yan; China
2018 Jakarta	Kim Young-gun; South Korea	Kimg Jung-gil; South Korea	Adyos Astan; Indonesia
2022 Hangzhou	Wanchai Chaiwut; Thailand	Kim Young-gun; South Korea	Kim Jung-gil; South Korea
2022 Hangzhou	Wanchai Chaiwut; Thailand	Kim Young-gun; South Korea	Kazuki Shichino; Japan

Class 5

Event	Gold	Silver	Bronze
2010 Guangzhou	Bai Gang; China	Javad Fouladitarghi; Iran	Kim Byoung-young; South Korea
2014 Incheon	Agus Sutanto; Indonesia	Kim Ki-young; South Korea	Cheng Ming-chih; Chinese Taipei
2014 Incheon	Agus Sutanto; Indonesia	Kim Ki-young; South Korea	Lin Yen-hung; Chinese Taipei
2018 Jakarta	Cao Ningning; China	Cheng Ming-chih; Chinese Taipei	Kim Ki-young; South Korea
2018 Jakarta	Cao Ningning; China	Cheng Ming-chih; Chinese Taipei	Lin Yen-hung; Chinese Taipei
2022 Hangzhou	Liu Fu; China	Zhan Dashun; China	Cheng Ming-chih; Chinese Taipei
2022 Hangzhou	Liu Fu; China	Zhan Dashun; China	Cao Ningning; China

Class 6

Event	Gold	Silver	Bronze
2010 Guangzhou; Class 6-7	Liao Keli; China	Rungroj Thainiyom; Thailand	Chen Chao; China
2014 Incheon	Park Hong-kyu; South Korea	Rungroj Thainiyom; Thailand	Jon Ju-hyon; North Korea
2014 Incheon	Park Hong-kyu; South Korea	Rungroj Thainiyom; Thailand	Choy Hing Lam; Hong Kong
2018 Jakarta	Rungroj Thainiyom; Thailand	Park Hong-kyu; South Korea	Chen Chao; China
2018 Jakarta	Rungroj Thainiyom; Thailand	Park Hong-kyu; South Korea	Rahmad Hidayat; Indonesia
2022 Hangzhou	Rungroj Thainiyom; Thailand	Huang Jiaxin; China	Takuro Chihara; Japan
2022 Hangzhou	Rungroj Thainiyom; Thailand	Huang Jiaxin; China	Rahmad Hidayat; Indonesia

Class 7

Event	Gold	Silver	Bronze
2014 Incheon	Liao Keli; China	Yan Shuo; China	Masachika Inoue; Japan
2014 Incheon	Liao Keli; China	Yan Shuo; China	Ajang Abidin; Indonesia
2018 Jakarta	Yan Shuo; China	Chalermpong Punpoo; Thailand	Katsuyoshi Yagi; Japan
2018 Jakarta	Yan Shuo; China	Chalermpong Punpoo; Thailand	Masachika Inoue; Japan
2022 Hangzhou	Katsuyoshi Yagi; Japan	Liao Keli; China	Yan Shuo; China
2022 Hangzhou	Katsuyoshi Yagi; Japan	Liao Keli; China	Chalermpong Punpoo; Thailand

Class 8

Event	Gold	Silver	Bronze
2010 Guangzhou	Zhao Shuai; China	Ye Chaoqun; China	Sun Churen; China
2014 Incheon	Zhao Shuai; China	Ye Chaoqun; China	Kim Kwang-jin; South Korea
2014 Incheon	Zhao Shuai; China	Ye Chaoqun; China	Sun Churen; China
2018 Jakarta	Zhao Shuai; China	Ye Chaoqun; China	Phisit Wangphonphathanasiri; Thailand
2018 Jakarta	Zhao Shuai; China	Ye Chaoqun; China	Hu Ming-fu; Chinese Taipei
2022 Hangzhou	Zhao Shuai; China	Peng Weinan; China	Sun Churen; China
2022 Hangzhou	Zhao Shuai; China	Peng Weinan; China	Phisit Wangphonphathanasiri; Thailand

Class 9

Event	Gold	Silver	Bronze
2010 Guangzhou	Ma Lin; China	Zhao Yiqing; China	Han Yajie; China
2014 Incheon	Ma Lin; China	Zhao Yiqing; China	Wong Chi Yin; Hong Kong
2014 Incheon	Ma Lin; China	Zhao Yiqing; China	Koyo Iwabuchi; Japan
2018 Jakarta	Zhao Yiqing; China	Koyo Iwabuchi; Japan	Chee Chaoming; Malaysia
2018 Jakarta	Zhao Yiqing; China	Koyo Iwabuchi; Japan	Wong Chi Yin; Hong Kong
2022 Hangzhou	Zhao Yiqing; China	Koyo Iwabuchi; Japan	Liu Chaodong; China
2022 Hangzhou	Zhao Yiqing; China	Koyo Iwabuchi; Japan	Wong Chi Yin; Hong Kong

Class 10

Event	Gold	Silver	Bronze
2010 Guangzhou	Ge Yang; China	Lian Hao; China	David Jacobs; Indonesia
2014 Incheon	David Jacobs; Indonesia	Dinesh Deshappriya Pitiyage Don Silva; Sri Lanka	Komet Akbar; Indonesia
2014 Incheon	David Jacobs; Indonesia	Dinesh Deshappriya Pitiyage Don Silva; Sri Lanka	Ge Yang; China
2018 Jakarta	David Jacobs; Indonesia	Lian Hao; China	Azwar Bakar; Malaysia
2018 Jakarta	David Jacobs; Indonesia	Lian Hao; China	Kong Weijie; China
2022 Hangzhou	Lian Hao; China	Mahiro Funayama; Japan	Lin Chun-ting; Chinese Taipei
2022 Hangzhou	Lian Hao; China	Mahiro Funayama; Japan	Su Jin-sian; Chinese Taipei

Class 11

Event	Gold	Silver	Bronze
2014 Incheon	Takeshi Takemori; Japan	Kim Gi-tae; South Korea	Kim Byoung-ha; South Korea
2014 Incheon	Takeshi Takemori; Japan	Kim Gi-tae; South Korea	Takashi Takeda; Japan
2018 Jakarta	Kim Gi-tae; South Korea	Jeong-Kyu-young; South Korea	Yudai Kikawada; Japan
2018 Jakarta	Kim Gi-tae; South Korea	Jeong-Kyu-young; South Korea	Toshiya Takahashi; Japan
2022 Hangzhou	Chen Po-yen; Chinese Taipei	Takeshi Takemori; Japan	Kim Chang-gi; South Korea
2022 Hangzhou	Chen Po-yen; Chinese Taipei	Takeshi Takemori; Japan	Kim Gi-tae; South Korea

=== Women's Singles ===
Class 1-2

Event	Gold	Silver	Bronze
2010 Guangzhou; Class 1-3	Li Qian; China	Liu Jing; China	Jung Sang-Sook; South Korea
2014 Incheon	Liu Jing; China	Seo Su-yeon; South Korea	No bronze medalist
2018 Jakarta; Class 1-3	Xue Juan; China	Li Qian; China	Lee Mi-gyu; South Korea
2018 Jakarta; Class 1-3	Xue Juan; China	Li Qian; China	Seo Su-yeon; South Korea
2022 Hangzhou	Seo Su-yeon; South Korea	Liu Jing; China	Chilchitraryak Bootwansirina; Thailand
2022 Hangzhou	Seo Su-yeon; South Korea	Liu Jing; China	Claire Toh; Singapore

Class 3

Event	Gold	Silver	Bronze
2014 Incheon	Lee Mi-gyu; South Korea	Xue Juan; China	Li Qian; China
2014 Incheon	Lee Mi-gyu; South Korea	Xue Juan; China	Dararat Asayut; Thailand
2022 Hangzhou	Yoon Ji-yu; South Korea	Xue Juan; China	Lee Mi-gyu; South Korea
2022 Hangzhou	Yoon Ji-yu; South Korea	Xue Juan; China	Dararat Asayut; Thailand

Class 4

Event	Gold	Silver	Bronze
2010 Guangzhou	Zhou Ying; China	Moon Sung-hye; South Korea	Zhang Miao; China
2014 Incheon	Zhou Ying; China	Zhang Miao; China	Lu Pi-chun; Chinese Taipei
2014 Incheon	Zhou Ying; China	Zhang Miao; China	Wijittra Jaion; Thailand
2018 Jakarta	Zhou Ying; China	Lu Pi-chun; Chinese Taipei	Zhang Miao; China
2018 Jakarta	Zhou Ying; China	Lu Pi-chun; Chinese Taipei	Wijittra Jaion; Thailand
2022 Hangzhou	Gu Xiaodan; China	Zhou Ying; China	Wijittra Jaion; Thailand
2022 Hangzhou	Gu Xiaodan; China	Zhou Ying; China	Bhavina Patel; India

Class 5

Event	Gold	Silver	Bronze
2010 Guangzhou	Gu Gai; China	Ren Guixiang; China	Zhang Bian; China
2014 Incheon	Zhang Bian; China	Jung Young-a; South Korea	Khetam Abuawad; Jordan
2014 Incheon	Zhang Bian; China	Jung Young-a; South Korea	Kimie Bessho; Japan
2018 Jakarta	Zhang Bian; China	Khetam Abuawad; Jordan	Pan Jiamin; China
2018 Jakarta	Zhang Bian; China	Khetam Abuawad; Jordan	Wong Pui Yi; Hong Kong
2022 Hangzhou	Pan Jiamin; China	Zhang Bian; China	Moon Sung-hye; South Korea
2022 Hangzhou	Pan Jiamin; China	Zhang Bian; China	Kang Oe-jeong; South Korea

Class 6

Event	Gold	Silver	Bronze
2010 Guangzhou; Class 6-8	Mao Jingdian; China	Josephine Medina; Philippines	Jiang Shan; China
2014 Incheon; Class 6-7	Wang Rui; China	Kim Seong-ok; South Korea	Lam Oi Man; Macau
2014 Incheon; Class 6-7	Wang Rui; China	Kim Seong-ok; South Korea	Lee Kun-woo; South Korea
2018 Jakarta	Lee Kun-woo; South Korea	Lam Oi Man; Macau	Zainab Farttoosi; Iraq
2018 Jakarta	Lee Kun-woo; South Korea	Lam Oi Man; Macau	Pascoela dos Santos Pereira; Timor-Leste
2022 Hangzhou	Najlah Al-Dayyeni; Iraq	Lee Kun-woo; South Korea	Pang Wing Ka; Hong Kong
2022 Hangzhou	Najlah Al-Dayyeni; Iraq	Lee Kun-woo; South Korea	Jin Yucheng; China

Class 7

Event	Gold	Silver	Bronze
2018 Jakarta	Wang Rui; China	Kim Seong-ok; South Korea	Chiu Kan Shan; Hong Kong
2018 Jakarta	Wang Rui; China	Kim Seong-ok; South Korea	U Choi Hong; Macau
2022 Hangzhou	Wang Rui; China	Chiu Kan Shan; Hong Kong	U Choi Hong; Macau
2022 Hangzhou	Wang Rui; China	Chiu Kan Shan; Hong Kong	Kim Seong-ok; South Korea

Class 8

Event	Gold	Silver	Bronze
2014 Incheon	Mao Jingdian; China	Pan Mengyi; China	Koh Duk-ja; South Korea
2014 Incheon	Mao Jingdian; China	Pan Mengyi; China	Josephine Medina; Philippines
2018 Jakarta	Mao Jingdian; China	Josephine Medina; Philippines	Huang Wenjuan; China
2018 Jakarta	Mao Jingdian; China	Josephine Medina; Philippines	Yuri Tomono; Japan
2022 Hangzhou	Huang Wenjuan; China	Yuri Tomono; Japan	Kanlaya Chaiwut-Kriabklang; Thailand
2022 Hangzhou	Huang Wenjuan; China	Yuri Tomono; Japan	Hamida; Indonesia

Class 9

Event	Gold	Silver	Bronze
2010 Guangzhou	Liu Meili; China	Liu Meng; China	Lei Lina; China
2014 Incheon; Class 9-10	Yang Qian; China	Lei Lina; China	Xiong Guiyan; China
2014 Incheon; Class 9-10	Yang Qian; China	Lei Lina; China	Shella Dwi Radayana; Indonesia
2018 Jakarta	Xiong Guiyan; China	Kim Kun-hea; South Korea	Chayanan Settisrikoedkun; Thailand
2022 Hangzhou	Mao Jingdian; China	Kim Kun-hea; South Korea	Xiong Guiyan; China
2022 Hangzhou	Mao Jingdian; China	Kim Kun-hea; South Korea	Liu Meng; China

Class 10

Event	Gold	Silver	Bronze
2010 Guangzhou	Yang Qian; China	Liu Xu; China	Kim Kun-hea; South Korea
2018 Jakarta	Fan Lei; China	Tien Shiau-wen; Chinese Taipei	Zhao Xiaojing; China
2018 Jakarta	Fan Lei; China	Tien Shiau-wen; Chinese Taipei	Nozomi Takeuchi; Japan
2022 Hangzhou	Lin Tzu-yu; Chinese Taipei	Tien Shiau-wen; Chinese Taipei	Nozomi Nakamura; Japan
2022 Hangzhou	Lin Tzu-yu; Chinese Taipei	Tien Shiau-wen; Chinese Taipei	Hou Chunxiao; China

Class 11

Event	Gold	Silver	Bronze
2014 Incheon	Wong Ka Man; Hong Kong	Ng Mui Wui; Hong Kong	Wong Pui Kei; Hong Kong
2014 Incheon	Wong Ka Man; Hong Kong	Ng Mui Wui; Hong Kong	Seo Yang-hee; South Korea
2018 Jakarta	Ng Mui Wui; Hong Kong	Ana Widyasari; Indonesia	Wong Ka Man; Hong Kong
2018 Jakarta	Ng Mui Wui; Hong Kong	Ana Widyasari; Indonesia	Seo Yang-hee; South Korea
2022 Hangzhou	Natsuki Wada; Japan	Wong Ting Ting; Hong Kong	Ng Mui Wui; Hong Kong
2022 Hangzhou	Natsuki Wada; Japan	Wong Ting Ting; Hong Kong	Kanami Furukawa; Japan

=== Men's Teams ===
Class 2-3

Year Location Gold Silver Bronze 2018 Jakarta (INA) GLINBANCHUEN Yuttajak (THA) KO Hang Yee (HKG) SEFRIANTO Yosep (INA)

	 	LAOWONG Anurak	CHOI Siu Hung	PAMBUDI Cahyo

Class 4-5

Year Location Gold Silver Bronze 2018 Jakarta (INA) SUTANTO Agus (INA) CHAIWUT Wanchai (THA) WICHAIWATTANA Wittaya (THA)

	 	HARDIYANTO Tatok	NACHAI Niyom	YODYANGDANG Jasada
	 	 	 	ASTAN Adyos (INA)
	 	 	 	GUNAYA Yayang

Class 6-7

Year Location Gold Silver Bronze 2018 Jakarta (INA) THAINIYOM Rungroj (THA) LEE Ming Yip (HKG) NAMSAGA Yuttana (THA)

	 	PUNPOO Chalermpong	CHEN Silu	THAPAENG Suriyone

Class 8-9

Year Location Gold Silver Bronze 2018 Jakarta (INA) CHEE Chao Ming (MAS) PRAHASTA Mohamad Rian (INA) MULYO Banyu Tri (INA)

	 	TING Ing Hock	KUSNANTO	WIDIYANTORO Wawan

Class 10

Year Location Gold Silver Bronze 2018 Jakarta (INA) JACOBS David (INA) SHIN Seung Weon (KOR) SILLAPAKONG Bunpot (THA)

	 	AKBAR Komet	JUNG Suk-Youn	UTHAISAR Chanyut

=== Women's Doubles ===
Class 3-5

Year Location Gold Silver Bronze 2018 Jakarta (INA) ASAYUT Dararat (THA) PATEL Bhavina (IND) ZHANG Miao (CHN)

	 	WARARITDAMRONGKUL Pattaravadee	PATEL Sonalben	PAN Jiamin

Class 6-10

Year Location Gold Silver Bronze 2018 Jakarta (INA) LIU Meng (CHN) KIM Kun Hea (KOR) SETTISRIKOEDKUN Chayanan (THA)

	 	ZHAO Xiaojing	JUNG Jin Mi	THERMOYA Wachiraporn
	 	 	 	DWI RADAYANA Shella (INA)
	 	 	 	RESTY Hana

=== Mixed Doubles ===
Class 2-3

Year Location Gold Silver Bronze 2018 Jakarta (INA) LAOWONG Anurak (THA) WICHAIWATTANA Wittaya (THA) SEFRIANTO Yosep (INA)

	 	ASAYUT Dararat	BOOTWANSIRINA Chilchitraryak	MUSLIM Osrita

Class 4-5

Year Location Gold Silver Bronze 2018 Jakarta (INA) CHAIWUT Wanchai (THA) KIM Ki Young (KOR) SUTANTO Agus (INA)

	 	JAION Wijitra	KANG Oe-Jeong	TARSILEM

Class 6-8

Year Location Gold Silver Bronze 2018 Jakarta (INA) PRAHASTA Mohamad Rian (INA) MULYO Banyu Tri (INA) KIM Hyeonggwon (KOR)

	 	SUWARTI Suwarti	HAMIDA Hamida	KOH Duk-Ja

Class 9-10

Year Location Gold Silver Bronze 2018 Jakarta (INA) ZHAO Yi Qing (CHN) SILLAPAKONG Bunpot (THA) AKBAR Komet (INA)

	 	LIU Meng	THERMOYA Wachiraporn	DWI RADAYANA Shella

=== Men's Team ===
Class 1-2

Year Location Gold Silver Bronze 2018 Jakarta (INA) Republic of Korea (KOR) Japan (JPN)

	 	CHA Soo-Yong	MATSUO Mitsuhiro	 
	 	NAM Kiwon	MINAMI Nobuhiro	 
	 	PARK Jin Cheol	 	 

Class 1-3

Year Location Gold Silver Bronze 2014 Incheon (KOR) People's Republic of China (CHN) Thailand (THA) Republic of Korea (KOR)

	 	FENG Panfeng	LAOWONG Anurak	CHA Soo-Yong
	 	WANG Sheng	WICHAIWATTANA Wittaya	JEYOUNG Young Ill
	 	ZHAI Xiang	 	KIM Jin Sung
	 	 	 	KIM Min Gyu
	 	 	 	Hong Kong, China (HKG)
	 	 	 	CHOI Siu Hung
	 	 	 	KO Hang Yee
	 	 	 	LAU Wing Cheong

2010 Guangzhou (CHN) People's Republic of China (CHN) Republic of Korea (KOR) Thailand (THA)

	 	FENG Panfeng	JUNG Young-Il	LAOWONG Anurak
	 	GAO Yan Ming	KIM Jeong Sok	WICHAIWATTANA Wittaya
	 	JIN Jun	KIM Young Gun	 
	 	ZHAO Ping	 	 

Class 3

Year Location Gold Silver Bronze 2018 Jakarta (INA) People's Republic of China (CHN) Republic of Korea (KOR) Chinese Taipei (TPE)

	 	FENG Panfeng	BAEK Youngbok	WU Cheng Sheng
	 	GAO Yan Ming	LIM Hangsueng	YIN Chien-Ping
	 	GUO Fei	 	 

Class 4

Year Location Gold Silver Bronze 2014 Incheon (KOR) Republic of Korea (KOR) Chinese Taipei (TPE) Thailand (THA)

	 	CHOI Il Sang	LIN Wen Hsin	CHAIWUT Wanchai
	 	KIM Jung Gil	LIU Ming-Tang	NACHAI Niyom
	 	KIM Young Gun	 	 
	 	LEE Chang Ho	 	 

Class 4-5

Year Location Gold Silver Bronze 2018 Jakarta (INA) Republic of Korea (KOR) People's Republic of China (CHN) Chinese Taipei (TPE)

	 	KIM Jung Gil	CAO Ningning	CHENG Ming-Chih
	 	KIM Young Gun	ZHANG Yan	 
	 	 	 	LIANG Chen-Kun
	 	 	 	LIN Wen Hsin
	 	 	 	LIN Yen Hung
	 	 	 	Chinese Taipei (TPE)
	 	 	 	CHENG Ming-Chih
	 	 	 	LIANG Chen-Kun
	 	 	 	LIN Wen Hsin
	 	 	 	LIN Yen Hung

2010 Guangzhou (CHN) Republic of Korea (KOR) People's Republic of China (CHN) Chinese Taipei (TPE)

	 	CHOI Il Sang	BAI Gang	KO Kun-Nan
	 	JUNG Eun Chang	CAO Ningning	LIN Wen Hsin
	 	KIM Byoung Young	GUO Xingyuan	LIN Yen Hung
	 	KIM Jung Gil	ZHANG Yan	 

Class 5

Year Location Gold Silver Bronze 2014 Incheon (KOR) People's Republic of China (CHN) Republic of Korea (KOR) Japan (JPN)

	 	CAO Ningning	JOO Young Dae	DOI Kentaro
	 	GUO Xingyuan	KIM Ki Young	OKA Toshihiko
	 	ZHANG Yan	KIM Kyung-Young	YOSHIDA Shinichi
	 	 	 	Chinese Taipei (TPE)
	 	 	 	CHENG Ming-Chih
	 	 	 	LIN Yen Hung

Class 6-7

Year Location Gold Silver Bronze 2018 Jakarta (INA) People's Republic of China (CHN) Korea (COR) Japan (JPN)

	 	CHEN Chao	KIM Yong Rok	INOUE Masachika
	 	YAN Shuo	LEE Se Ho	KANEKO Kazuya
	 	 	PARK Hong-Kyu	YAGI Katsuyoshi

2014 Incheon (KOR) People's Republic of China (CHN) Republic of Korea (KOR) Thailand (THA)

	 	CHEN Chao	KIM Young-Sung	NAMSAGA Yuttana
	 	HUANG Jiaxin	PARK Hong-Kyu	PUNPOO Chalermpong
	 	LIAO Keli	 	THAINIYOM Rungroj
	 	YAN Shuo	 	 

Class 6-8

Year Location Gold Silver Bronze 2010 Guangzhou (CHN) People's Republic of China (CHN) Republic of Korea (KOR) Chinese Taipei (TPE)

	 	LI Manzhou	KIM Kwang Jin	HOU Ting Sung
	 	SUN Churen	KIM Young-Sung	HU Ming Fu
	 	YE Chao Qun	LEE Cheon Sik	 
	 	ZHAO Shuai	SON Jin-Kwang	 

Class 8

Year Location Gold Silver Bronze 2018 Jakarta (INA) People's Republic of China (CHN) Thailand (THA) Vietnam (VIE)

	 	YE Chao Qun	CHARITSAT Komkrit	PHAM van Hoang
	 	ZHAO Shuai	KEEREERUT Parinya Chuaigate	VO Quoc Hung
	 	 	WANGPHONPHATHANASIRI Phisit	 
	 	 	 	Japan (JPN)
	 	 	 	SHUKUNOBE Takumi
	 	 	 	TATEISHI Arufua Hirokazu

2014 Incheon (KOR) People's Republic of China (CHN) Republic of Korea (KOR) Thailand (THA)

	 	SUN Churen	KIM Kwang Jin	CHARITSAT Komkrit
	 	YE Chao Qun	YANG Gui-Nam	KEEREERUT Parinya Chuaigate
	 	ZHAO Shuai	 	 
	 	 	 	Chinese Taipei (TPE)
	 	 	 	HOU Ting Sung
	 	 	 	HU Ming Fu

Class 9-10

Year Location Gold Silver Bronze 2018 Jakarta (INA) Japan (JPN) People's Republic of China (CHN)

	 	IWABUCHI Koyo	KONG Weijie	 
	 	KAKITA Nariaki	LIAN Hao	 
	 	NAGASHITA Naoya	 	 

2014 Incheon (KOR) People's Republic of China (CHN) Indonesia (INA) Malaysia (MAS)

	 	GE Yang	AKBAR Komet	BAKAR Mohamad
	 	LIAN Hao	JACOBS David	CHEE Chao Ming
	 	MA Lin	 	HAMZAH Mohd Nazizul
	 	ZHAO Yi Qing	 	TING Ing Hock
	 	 	 	Chinese Taipei (TPE)
	 	 	 	JU Ren-Der
	 	 	 	LEE Yao-Tang
	 	 	 	LIN Chun-Ting

2010 Guangzhou (CHN) People's Republic of China (CHN) Chinese Taipei (TPE) Malaysia (MAS)

	 	LIAN Hao	JU Ren-Der	BAKAR Mohamad
	 	LU Xiaolei	LEE Yao-Tang	HONG Chin Sing
	 	MA Lin	LU Weichen	KOH Zhi Liang
	 	YAN Shuo	 	TING Ing Hock

Class 11

Year Location Gold Silver Bronze 2018 Jakarta (INA) Republic of Korea (KOR) Hong Kong, China (HKG)

	 	JEONG Kyuyoung	LEUNG Chung Yan	 
	 	KIM Gi-Tae	TSOI Ming Fai	 
	 	 	WAN Wai Lok	 

2014 Incheon (KOR) Republic of Korea (KOR) Japan (JPN)

	 	KIM Gi-Tae	TAKEDA Takashi	 
	 	LEE Byoungha	TAKEMORI Takeshi	 
	 	 	TERASAWA Koichi	 

=== Women's Team ===
Class 1-3

Year Location Gold Silver Bronze 2014 Incheon (KOR) People's Republic of China (CHN) Republic of Korea (KOR) Thailand (THA)

	 	LI Qian	KIM Sun-Ja	ASAYUT Dararat
	 	LIU Jing	LEE Mi-Gyu	BOOTWANSIRINA Chilchitraryak
	 	XUE Juan	SEO Su-Yeon	 

2010 Guangzhou (CHN) People's Republic of China (CHN) Republic of Korea (KOR) Islamic Republic of Iran (IRI)

	 	LI Qian	CHOI Hyun Ja	BAKHTIARY Forough
	 	LIU Jing	JUNG Sang Sook	CHAZANISHARAHI Elham
	 	 	KIM Sun-Ja	 

Class 2-5

Year Location Gold Silver Bronze 2018 Jakarta (INA) People's Republic of China (CHN) People's Republic of China (CHN) Republic of Korea (KOR)

	 	LI Qian	 	LEE Mi-Gyu
	 	 	LI Qian	SEO Su-Yeon
	 	XUE Juan	 	SHIN Mi Kyoung
	 	 	XUE Juan	 
	 	ZHANG Bian	 	 
	 	 	ZHANG Bian	 
	 	ZHOU Ying	 	 
	 	 	ZHOU Ying	 

Class 4-5

Year Location Gold Silver Bronze 2014 Incheon (KOR) People's Republic of China (CHN) Republic of Korea (KOR) Jordan (JOR)

	 	ZHANG Bian	JUNG Ji Nam	ABU AWAD Khetam
	 	ZHANG Miao	JUNG Young A	AL AZZAM Fatemah
	 	ZHOU Ying	KANG Oe-Jeong	E'LEIMAT Faten
	 	 	 	Chinese Taipei (TPE)
	 	 	 	LEE Ya-Chu
	 	 	 	LU Pi Chun
	 	 	 	WEI Mei Hui

2010 Guangzhou (CHN) People's Republic of China (CHN) Republic of Korea (KOR) Chinese Taipei (TPE)

	 	GU Gai	JUNG Ji Nam	LEE Ya-Chu
	 	REN Guixiang	JUNG Young A	LU Pi Chun
	 	ZHANG Bian	KIM Young Soon	WEI Mei Hui
	 	ZHANG Miao	MOON Sung Hye	 

Class 6-7

Year Location Gold Silver Bronze 2018 Jakarta (INA) Republic of Korea (KOR) Macao, China (MAC)

	 	KIM Seong-Ok	LAM Oi Man	 
	 	LEE Kun-Woo	U Choi Hong	 

Class 6-8

Year Location Gold Silver Bronze 2014 Incheon (KOR) People's Republic of China (CHN) Republic of Korea (KOR)

	 	MAO Jingdian	KIM Seong-Ok	 
	 	PAN Mengyi	LEE Kun-Woo	 
	 	WANG Rui	 	 

Class 6-10

Year Location Gold Silver Bronze 2010 Guangzhou (CHN) People's Republic of China (CHN) Republic of Korea (KOR) Vietnam (VIE)

	 	FAN Lei	KIM Kun Hea	NGUYEN Thi Hoa Phuong
	 	HOU Chunxiao	KIM Mi-Soon	VIET Thi Kim Van
	 	YANG Qian	LEE Wol Soon	 
	 	YU Hailian	 	 

Class 8-10

Year Location Gold Silver Bronze 2018 Jakarta (INA) People's Republic of China (CHN) Chinese Taipei (TPE) Vietnam (VIE)

	 	FAN Lei	LIN Tzu Yu	NGUYEN Thi Hoa Phuong
	 	 	TIAN Shiau Wen	VIET Thi Kim Van
	 	HUANG Wenjuan	 	 
	 	MAO Jingdian	 	 
	 	WANG Rui	 	 
	 	XIONG Guiyan	 	 
	 	 	 	People's Republic of China (CHN)
	 	 	 	FAN Lei
	 	 	 	HUANG Wenjuan
	 	 	 	MAO Jingdian
	 	 	 	WANG Rui
	 	 	 	XIONG Guiyan

Class 9-10

Year Location Gold Silver Bronze 2014 Incheon (KOR) People's Republic of China (CHN) Thailand (THA) Republic of Korea (KOR)

	 	LEI Lina	SETTISRIKOEDKUN Chayanan	JUNG Jin Mi
	 	LIU Meng	THERMOYA Wachiraporn	KOH Duk-Ja
	 	XIONG Guiyan	 	 
	 	YANG Qian	 	 
	 	 	 	Vietnam (VIE)
	 	 	 	NGUYEN Thi Hoa Phuong
	 	 	 	VIET Thi Kim Van

Class 11

Year Location Gold Silver Bronze 2018 Jakarta (INA) Hong Kong, China (HKG) Indonesia (INA)

	 	LI Hiu Tung	AMALIA Lola	 
	 	NG Mui Wui	WIDYASARI Ana	 
	 	WONG Ka Man	 	 

== See also ==
- Table tennis at the Summer Paralympics
- Table tennis at the Asian Games
