= Asian Para Games =

Multi-sport event

- Abbreviation: Para-Asiad
- Purpose: Multi-sport event for athletes with disabilities from nations in Asia
- Frequency: Every four years
- Inaugurated: 2010 Asian Para Games in Guangzhou, China
- Most recent: 2026 Asian Para Games in Aichi Prefecture and Nagoya, Japan
- Next event: 2030 Asian Para Games in Doha, Qatar

Asian Para Games
- 2010; 2014; 2018; 2022; 2026
- Archery; Athletics; Badminton; Boccia; Bowling/Ten-pin Bowling; Chess; Cycling; Football 5-a-side; Football 7-a-side; Goalball; Judo; Lawn Bowls; Powerlifting; Rowing; Sailing; Shooting; Swimming; Table tennis; Sitting Volleyball; Wheelchair Basketball; Wheelchair Dance Sport; Wheelchair Fencing; Wheelchair Rugby; Wheelchair Tennis

The Asian Para Games, also known as Para Asiad, is a multi-sport event regulated by the Asian Paralympic Committee that's held every four years after every Asian Games for athletes with physical disabilities. Both events had adopted the strategy used by the Olympic and Paralympic Games of having both games in the same city. However, the exclusion of Asian Para Games from Asian Games host city contract meant that both events ran independently of each other. The Games are recognized by the International Paralympic Committee and are described as the second largest multi-sport event after the Paralympic Games.

In its history, four nations have hosted the Asian Para Games, and forty-five nations have participated in the Games.

The most recent Games was held in Aichi Prefecture and Nagoya, Japan between 18 and 24 October 2026. The next Games are scheduled to be held in Doha, Qatar in 2030.

== History ==
The FESPIC Games existed previous to the Asian Para Games and was contested by athletes from the Asia Pacific region. The FESPIC Games was first held in 1975 in Oita, Japan with 18 participating nations. Eight more FESPIC Games were held until 2006.

The Asian Para Games superseded the FESPIC Games, which was dissolved alongside the FESPIC Federation, the governing body of the games and merged with the Asian Paralympic Council which was renamed as the Asian Paralympic Committee at the closing of the final FESPIC edition held in November 2006 in Kuala Lumpur, Malaysia. The first Asian multi-sports event for athletes with a disability, the inaugural Asian Para Games was held in 2010 in Guangzhou, China.

Although there is the idea of holding the Asian and the Asian Para Games in the same city as happening on the Olympics and the Paralympics, to this day there is no mention of the Para Asian Games in the contract for the host city of the Asian Games, which means that the events could be held completely separately and without any connection. Both events ran independently of each other and could be organized by different Organising Committees in different cities.

== Editions ==
Host cities of the Asian Para Games

Edition	Year	Host	Games dates / Opened by (Note: Names & offices in italics reflect an opener who was not head of state when opening the Games. If the office is partially italicized, the non-italicized portion is the office & name of the head of state being represented.)	Nations	Competitors	Sports	Events	Top Placed Team	Ref.
1	2010	(China) Guangzhou	12 - 19 December; Vice Premier Li Keqiang (Note: Representing Hu Jintao, General Secretary of the Chinese Communist Party and President of China.)	41	2,405	19	341	China (CHN)	
2	2014	(South Korea) Incheon	18 - 24 October; Prime Minister Chung Hong-won (Note: Representing Park Geun-hye, President of South Korea.)	41	2,497	23	443	China (CHN)	
3	2018	(Indonesia) Jakarta	6 - 13 October; President Joko Widodo	43	2,757	18	506	China (CHN)	
4	2022	(China) Hangzhou	22 - 28 October 2023 (Note: Originally scheduled for 9-15 October 2022, the Games were postponed by one year due to the COVID-19 pandemic.); Vice Premier Ding Xuexiang (Note: Representing Xi Jinping, General Secretary of the Chinese Communist Party and President of China.)	44	3,100	22	501	China (CHN)	
5	2026	(Japan) Aichi Prefecture and Nagoya	18 - 24 October; Emperor Naruhito	45	2,590	18	489	China (CHN)	
6	2030	(Qatar) Doha	Future event						
7	2034	(Saudi Arabia) Riyadh	Future event						

=== Ranking ===
Year	Ranking by Medals		
Year	1	2	3
2010	China (185 gold)	Japan (32 gold)	South Korea (27 gold)
2014	China (174 gold)	South Korea (72 gold)	Japan (38 gold)
2018	China (172 gold)	South Korea (54 gold)	Iran (51 gold)
2022	China (214 gold)	Iran (44 gold)	Japan (42 gold)
2026	China (207 gold)	Japan (64 gold)	Uzbekistan (45 gold)

== Sports ==
27 Sports were presented in Asian Para Games history, including 2010 Asian Para Games to 2026 Asian Para Games.

Number	Event	2010	2014	2018	2022	2026
Core Sports
1	Para Archery at the Asian Para Games	Yes	Yes	Yes	Yes	Yes
2	Para Athletics at the Asian Para Games	Yes	Yes	Yes	Yes	Yes
3	Para Cycling at the Asian Para Games	Yes	Yes	Yes	Yes	Yes
4	Para Shooting at the Asian Para Games	Yes	Yes	Yes	Yes	Yes
5	Para Swimming at the Asian Para Games	Yes	Yes	Yes	Yes	Yes
Boat Sports
6	Para Canoeing at the Asian Para Games	No	No	No	Yes	Yes
7	Para Rowing at the Asian Para Games	Yes	Yes	No	Yes	Yes
8	Para Sailing at the Asian Para Games	No	Yes	No	No	No
Combat Sports
9	Wheelchair Fencing at the Asian Para Games	Yes	Yes	Yes	Yes	Yes
10	Blind Judo at the Asian Para Games	Yes	Yes	Yes	Yes	Yes
11	Para Taekwondo at the Asian Para Games	No	No	No	Yes	Yes
Team Sports
12	Wheelchair Basketball at the Asian Para Games	Yes	Yes	Yes	Yes	Yes
13	Blind Football at the Asian Para Games	Yes	Yes	No	Yes	Yes
14	CP Football at the Asian Para Games	Yes	Yes	No	No	No
15	Goalball at the Asian Para Games	Yes	Yes	Yes	Yes	Yes
16	Wheelchair Rugby at the Asian Para Games	No	Yes	No	No	Yes
17	Sitting volleyball at the Asian Para Games	Yes	Yes	Yes	Yes	Yes
Racket Sports
18	Para Badminton at the Asian Para Games	Yes	Yes	Yes	Yes	Yes
19	Wheelchair Tennis at the Asian Para Games	Yes	Yes	Yes	Yes	Yes
20	Para Table Tennis at the Asian Para Games	Yes	Yes	Yes	Yes	Yes
Bowl Sports
21	Boccia at the Asian Para Games	Yes	Yes	Yes	Yes	Yes
22	Bowling at the Asian Para Games	Yes	Yes	Yes	No	No
23	Lawn Bowls at the Asian Para Games	No	Yes	Yes	Yes	No
Adversary Sports
24	Chess at the Asian Para Games	No	No	Yes	Yes	No
25	Go at the Asian Para Games	No	No	No	Yes	No
26	Powerlifting at the Asian Para Games	Yes	Yes	Yes	Yes	Yes
27	Wheelchair Dance Sport at the Asian Para Games	No	Yes	No	No	No

=== Para Archery (2010–2026) ===
Rank	Nation	Gold	Silver	Bronze	Total
1	China (CHN)	24	15	14	53
2	Iran (IRI)	13	5	8	26
3	South Korea (KOR)	7	12	9	28
4	India (IND)	6	6	2	14
5	Japan (JPN)	2	3	2	7
6	Thailand (THA)	1	1	2	4
7	Iraq (IRQ)	1	0	1	2
8	Indonesia (INA)	0	3	3	6
9	Singapore (SGP)	0	2	0	2
10	Hong Kong (HKG)	0	1	1	2
10	Kazakhstan (KAZ)	0	1	1	2
10	Mongolia (MGL)	0	1	1	2
13	Chinese Taipei (TPE)	0	0	1	1
13	Malaysia (MAS)	0	0	1	1
Totals (14 entries)		54	50	46	150

=== Para Athletics (2010–2026) ===
Rank	Nation	Gold	Silver	Bronze	Total
1	China (CHN)	292	177	110	579
2	Iran (IRI)	97	109	82	288
3	Japan (JPN)	60	74	63	197
4	Uzbekistan (UZB)	54	40	45	139
5	India (IND)	50	62	68	180
6	Thailand (THA)	48	63	65	176
7	Malaysia (MAS)	24	21	22	67
8	Iraq (IRQ)	18	17	22	57
9	Saudi Arabia (KSA)	15	17	8	40
10	Indonesia (INA)	14	29	35	78
11	United Arab Emirates (UAE)	12	21	12	45
12	Sri Lanka (SRI)	11	17	21	49
13	South Korea (KOR)	10	19	17	46
14	Jordan (JOR)	5	3	2	10
15	Pakistan (PAK)	5	2	3	10
16	Oman (OMA)	3	5	2	10
17	Qatar (QAT)	3	2	5	10
18	Kuwait (KUW)	2	7	9	18
19	Timor-Leste (TLS)	2	2	0	4
20	Bahrain (BHR)	1	6	6	13
21	Chinese Taipei (TPE)	1	4	13	18
22	Kazakhstan (KAZ)	1	3	9	13
23	Philippines (PHI)	1	3	4	8
24	Syria (SYR)	1	2	6	9
25	Myanmar (MYA)	1	0	5	6
26	Palestine (PLE)	1	0	1	2
27	Vietnam (VIE)	0	6	21	27
28	Mongolia (MGL)	0	4	3	7
29	Hong Kong (HKG)	0	3	6	9
30	Brunei (BRU)	0	2	3	5
31	Kyrgyzstan (KGZ)	0	2	1	3
32	Cambodia (CAM)	0	0	1	1
Totals (32 entries)		732	722	670	2,124

=== Para Cycling (2010–2026) ===
Rank	Nation	Gold	Silver	Bronze	Total
1	China (CHN)	55	35	22	112
2	South Korea (KOR)	29	12	19	60
3	Japan (JPN)	15	15	14	44
4	Malaysia (MAS)	7	17	13	37
5	Indonesia (INA)	5	12	16	33
6	Uzbekistan (UZB)	4	9	4	17
7	Kazakhstan (KAZ)	4	4	3	11
8	Thailand (THA)	1	9	5	15
9	Philippines (PHI)	1	0	3	4
10	United Arab Emirates (UAE)	0	2	2	4
11	Iran (IRI)	0	1	4	5
12	Lebanon (LBN)	0	1	3	4
13	India (IND)	0	0	1	1
13	Saudi Arabia (KSA)	0	0	1	1
13	Singapore (SGP)	0	0	1	1
Totals (15 entries)		121	117	111	349

=== Para Shooting Sporting (2010–2026) ===
Source (APC Profile):

Rank	Nation	Gold	Silver	Bronze	Total
1	South Korea (KOR)	22	19	28	69
2	China (CHN)	21	23	18	62
3	Iran (IRI)	8	6	4	18
4	Thailand (THA)	6	8	5	19
5	India (IND)	5	5	4	14
6	United Arab Emirates (UAE)	3	5	3	11
7	Kazakhstan (KAZ)	1	0	0	1
8	Japan (JPN)	0	0	2	2
9	Iraq (IRQ)	0	0	1	1
9	Mongolia (MGL)	0	0	1	1
Totals (10 entries)		66	66	66	198

=== Para Swimming (2010–2026) ===
Source (NPC Profile):

Rank	Nation	Gold	Silver	Bronze	Total
1	China (CHN)	255	187	115	557
2	Japan (JPN)	97	104	109	310
3	Uzbekistan (UZB)	37	27	19	83
4	Iran (IRI)	17	20	27	64
5	South Korea (KOR)	16	32	21	69
6	Kazakhstan (KAZ)	16	20	23	59
7	Vietnam (VIE)	14	11	16	41
8	Indonesia (INA)	12	14	9	35
9	Hong Kong (HKG)	8	14	11	33
10	Thailand (THA)	6	26	55	87
11	Malaysia (MAS)	6	13	21	40
12	Philippines (PHI)	6	4	10	20
12	Singapore (SGP)	6	4	10	20
14	Chinese Taipei (TPE)	6	3	6	15
15	India (IND)	1	6	24	31
16	Myanmar (MYA)	0	4	10	14
17	Sri Lanka (SRI)	0	3	3	6
18	Iraq (IRQ)	0	1	1	2
18	Qatar (QAT)	0	1	1	2
20	Korea (COR)	0	0	1	1
Totals (20 entries)		503	494	492	1,489

=== Para Canoeing (2022) ===
Rank	Nation	Gold	Silver	Bronze	Total
1	Uzbekistan (UZB)	6	0	0	6
2	Iran (IRI)	2	1	2	5
3	China (CHN)	1	3	2	6
4	India (IND)	1	1	2	4
5	Kazakhstan (KAZ)	0	3	2	5
6	Japan (JPN)	0	1	2	3
7	Thailand (THA)	0	1	0	1
Totals (7 entries)		10	10	10	30

=== Para Rowing (2010–2022) ===
Rank	Nation	Gold	Silver	Bronze	Total
1	China (CHN)	8	2	0	10
2	South Korea (KOR)	2	3	1	6
3	Uzbekistan (UZB)	1	1	2	4
4	Japan (JPN)	0	3	2	5
5	Hong Kong (HKG)	0	1	4	5
6	India (IND)	0	1	0	1
7	Thailand (THA)	0	0	2	2
Totals (7 entries)		11	11	11	33

=== Para Sailing (2014) ===
Rank	Nation	Gold	Silver	Bronze	Total
1	Malaysia (MAS)	1	1	1	3
2	Singapore (SIN)	1	0	0	1
3	Japan (JPN)	0	1	0	1
4	Hong Kong (HKG)	0	0	1	1
Totals (4 entries)		2	2	2	6

=== Wheelchair Fencing (2010–2026) ===
Rank	Nation	Gold	Silver	Bronze	Total
1	China (CHN)	67	33	43	143
2	Hong Kong (HKG)	8	19	27	54
3	Thailand (THA)	7	14	21	42
4	Iraq (IRQ)	1	8	8	17
5	South Korea (KOR)	1	7	23	31
6	Japan (JPN)	0	2	12	14
7	Malaysia (MAS)	0	1	2	3
8	Kuwait (KUW)	0	0	2	2
9	India (IND)	0	0	1	1
9	Indonesia (INA)	0	0	1	1
9	United Arab Emirates (UAE)	0	0	1	1
Totals (11 entries)		84	84	141	309

=== Blind Judo (2010–2026) ===
Rank	Nation	Gold	Silver	Bronze	Total
1	China (CHN)	20	5	19	44
2	Uzbekistan (UZB)	16	18	18	52
3	South Korea (KOR)	11	7	8	26
4	Iran (IRI)	8	9	14	31
5	Kazakhstan (KAZ)	8	6	16	30
6	Japan (JPN)	5	12	21	38
7	Mongolia (MGL)	4	4	12	20
8	Kyrgyzstan (KGZ)	2	0	0	2
9	Indonesia (INA)	1	1	4	6
10	Thailand (THA)	0	4	3	7
11	India (IND)	0	2	4	6
12	Chinese Taipei (TPE)	0	2	3	5
13	Tajikistan (TJK)	0	1	0	1
14	Yemen (YEM)	0	0	1	1
Totals (14 entries)		75	71	123	269

=== Para Taekwondo (2022-2026) ===
Rank	Nation	Gold	Silver	Bronze	Total
1	Iran (IRI)	7	5	9	21
2	China (CHN)	4	3	5	12
3	Mongolia (MGL)	3	2	0	5
4	Uzbekistan (UZB)	2	5	13	20
5	Chinese Taipei (TPE)	2	0	0	2
6	Thailand (THA)	1	1	3	5
7	South Korea (KOR)	1	1	2	4
8	Kazakhstan (KAZ)	0	2	3	5
9	Japan (JPN)	0	2	1	3
10	India (IND)	0	0	1	1
10	Iraq (IRQ)	0	0	1	1
10	Nepal (NEP)	0	0	1	1
Totals (12 entries)		20	21	39	80

=== Wheelchair Basketball (2010–2026) ===
Rank	Nation	Gold	Silver	Bronze	Total
1	Japan (JPN)	4	6	0	10
2	China (CHN)	4	2	0	6
3	Iran (IRI)	1	1	3	5
3	South Korea (KOR)	1	1	3	5
5	Thailand (THA)	0	0	4	4
Totals (5 entries)		10	10	10	30

=== Blind Football (2010–2026) ===
Rank	Nation	Gold	Silver	Bronze	Total
1	China (CHN)	3	0	1	4
2	Iran (IRN)	1	2	1	4
3	Japan (JPN)	0	2	0	2
4	South Korea (KOR)	0	0	1	1
4	Thailand (THA)	0	0	1	1
Totals (5 entries)		4	4	4	12

=== CP Football (2010–2014) ===
Rank	Nation	Gold	Silver	Bronze	Total
1	Iran (IRN)	2	0	0	2
2	Japan (JPN)	0	1	1	2
3	China (CHN)	0	1	0	1
4	South Korea (KOR)	0	0	1	1
Totals (4 entries)		2	2	2	6

=== Goalball (2010–2026) ===
Rank	Nation	Gold	Silver	Bronze	Total
1	China (CHN)	6	4	0	10
2	Japan (JPN)	2	4	2	8
3	Iran (IRI)	2	1	4	7
4	South Korea (KOR)	0	1	3	4
5	Thailand (THA)	0	0	1	1
Totals (5 entries)		10	10	10	30

=== Wheelchair Rugby (2014, 2026) ===
Rank	Nation	Gold	Silver	Bronze	Total
1	Japan (JPN)	1	1	0	2
1	South Korea (KOR)	1	1	0	2
3	Malaysia (MAS)	0	0	1	1
3	Thailand (THA)	0	0	1	1
Totals (4 entries)		2	2	2	6

=== Sitting Volleyball (2010–2026) ===
Rank	Nation	Gold	Silver	Bronze	Total
1	Iran (IRN)	5	4	1	10
2	China (CHN)	5	3	1	9
3	Kazakhstan (KAZ)	0	2	1	3
4	Japan (JPN)	0	1	4	5
5	Iraq (IRQ)	0	0	3	3
Totals (5 entries)		10	10	10	30

=== Para Badminton (2010–2026) ===
Rank	Nation	Gold	Silver	Bronze	Total
1	China (CHN)	32	18	29	79
2	Indonesia (INA)	19	20	15	54
3	India (IND)	11	13	29	53
4	South Korea (KOR)	9	16	17	42
5	Malaysia (MAS)	7	5	14	26
6	Japan (JPN)	6	2	16	24
7	Hong Kong (HKG)	3	2	5	10
8	Thailand (THA)	2	11	18	31
9	Vietnam (VIE)	2	0	4	6
10	Chinese Taipei (TPE)	0	3	4	7
11	Sri Lanka (SRI)	0	1	0	1
Totals (11 entries)		91	91	151	333

=== Wheelchair Tennis (2010–2026) ===
Rank	Nation	Gold	Silver	Bronze	Total
1	Japan (JPN)	18	13	8	39
2	Thailand (THA)	4	3	6	13
3	China (CHN)	3	6	3	12
4	South Korea (KOR)	3	5	5	13
5	Malaysia (MAS)	0	1	0	1
6	Chinese Taipei (TPE)	0	0	5	5
7	Sri Lanka (SRI)	0	0	1	1
Totals (7 entries)		28	28	28	84

=== Para Table Tennis (2010–2026) ===
Rank	Nation	Gold	Silver	Bronze	Total
1	China (CHN)	85	43	48	176
2	South Korea (KOR)	37	42	41	120
3	Thailand (THA)	12	19	40	71
4	Japan (JPN)	10	14	25	49
5	Indonesia (INA)	7	5	23	35
6	Chinese Taipei (TPE)	6	14	21	41
7	Hong Kong (HKG)	4	11	29	44
8	Iraq (IRQ)	2	0	1	3
9	Malaysia (MAS)	1	0	6	7
10	Philippines (PHI)	0	3	1	4
11	Iran (IRI)	0	2	6	8
12	Macau (MAC)	0	2	3	5
13	Jordan (JOR)	0	2	2	4
14	Saudi Arabia (KSA)	0	2	0	2
15	India (IND)	0	1	9	10
16	North Korea (PRK)	0	1	2	3
17	Korea (COR)	0	1	0	1
17	Kuwait (KUW)	0	1	0	1
17	Sri Lanka (SRI)	0	1	0	1
20	Kazakhstan (KAZ)	0	0	4	4
20	Vietnam (VIE)	0	0	4	4
22	Singapore (SGP)	0	0	1	1
22	Timor-Leste (TLS)	0	0	1	1
Totals (23 entries)		164	164	267	595

=== Boccia (2010–2026) ===
Rank	Nation	Gold	Silver	Bronze	Total
1	Thailand (THA)	15	7	10	32
2	South Korea (KOR)	6	13	8	27
3	Hong Kong (HKG)	6	7	11	24
4	China (CHN)	6	4	5	15
5	Indonesia (INA)	5	1	1	7
6	Malaysia (MAS)	1	3	1	5
7	Japan (JPN)	1	1	3	5
8	Singapore (SGP)	0	4	1	5
Totals (8 entries)		40	40	40	120

=== Ten Pin Para Bowling (2010–2018) ===
Rank	Nation	Gold	Silver	Bronze	Total
1	South Korea (KOR)	28	14	7	49
2	Chinese Taipei (TPE)	5	9	10	24
3	Malaysia (MAS)	4	7	11	22
4	Philippines (PHI)	1	2	0	3
5	Hong Kong (HKG)	1	1	1	3
6	Indonesia (INA)	1	1	0	2
7	Japan (JPN)	0	5	1	6
8	Singapore (SIN)	0	1	5	6
9	Thailand (THA)	0	0	6	6
10	Brunei (BRU)	0	0	1	1
Totals (10 entries)		40	40	42	122

=== Para Lawn Bowls (2014–2022) ===
Source (NPC Profile):

Rank	Nation	Gold	Silver	Bronze	Total
1	South Korea (KOR)	18	12	6	36
2	China (CHN)	7	4	3	14
3	Hong Kong (HKG)	6	9	6	21
4	Indonesia (INA)	6	7	11	24
5	Thailand (THA)	4	1	3	8
6	Malaysia (MAS)	2	9	8	19
7	Singapore (SGP)	0	1	1	2
8	Japan (JPN)	0	0	1	1
Totals (8 entries)		43	43	39	125

=== Blind Chess (2018–2022) ===
Rank	NPC	Gold	Silver	Bronze	Total
1	Indonesia (INA)	21	12	14	47
2	Philippines (PHI)	13	5	8	26
3	Iran (IRI)	8	13	8	29
4	India (IND)	4	6	7	17
5	Vietnam (VIE)	2	9	8	19
6	South Korea (KOR)	2	0	1	3
7	China (CHN)	1	2	1	4
8	Myanmar (MYA)	0	2	0	2
9	Kazakhstan (KAZ)	0	1	1	2
10	Thailand (THA)	0	1	0	1
11	Chinese Taipei (TPE)	0	0	1	1
Totals (11 entries)		51	51	49	151

=== Powerlifting (2010–2026) ===
Rank	Nation	Gold	Silver	Bronze	Total
1	China (CHN)	52	15	7	74
2	Iran (IRI)	14	22	10	46
3	Iraq (IRQ)	6	5	9	20
4	Uzbekistan (UZB)	6	5	4	15
5	Jordan (JOR)	6	4	2	12
6	Vietnam (VIE)	4	5	5	14
7	Thailand (THA)	3	3	7	13
8	Kazakhstan (KAZ)	2	7	8	17
9	Malaysia (MAS)	2	4	4	10
10	South Korea (KOR)	2	2	8	12
11	Mongolia (MGL)	2	1	1	4
12	Chinese Taipei (TPE)	2	0	2	4
13	United Arab Emirates (UAE)	1	2	3	6
14	Laos (LAO)	1	0	1	2
15	Indonesia (INA)	0	9	11	20
16	India (IND)	0	6	5	11
17	Syria (SYR)	0	5	6	11
18	Philippines (PHI)	0	5	1	6
19	Turkmenistan (TKM)	0	2	4	6
20	Saudi Arabia (KSA)	0	1	0	1
21	Japan (JPN)	0	0	2	2
Totals (21 entries)		103	103	100	306

=== Wheelchair Dance Sport (2014) ===
Rank	Nation	Gold	Silver	Bronze	Total
1	South Korea (KOR)	5	0	1	6
2	Hong Kong (HKG)	1	1	1	3
3	Chinese Taipei (TPE)	0	2	2	4
4	Kazakhstan (KAZ)	0	2	1	3
5	Philippines (PHI)	0	1	0	1
6	Japan (JPN)	0	0	1	1
Totals (6 entries)		6	6	6	18

== Mascots ==
The Asian Para Games mascots are fictional characters, usually an animal native to the area or human figures, who represent the cultural heritage of the place where the Asian Para Games are taking place. The mascots are often used to help market the Asian Para Games to a younger audience. Every Asian Para Games has its own mascot. Fun Fun, the mascot for the 2010 Asian Para Games was the first mascot.

Games	City	Mascot	Character	Significance
2010 Asian Para Games	Guangzhou	Fun Fun	Character inspired by kapok	A flower which is native to Guangzhou, represents strength, joy and vitality of the athletes and the Asian Para movement.
2014 Asian Para Games	Incheon	Jeonopi and Dnopi	Black-faced spoonbill	Chosen by organizers to highlight the games organiser commitment in environmental conservation. Jeonopi represents friendship with people in Asia and the world and the clean natural environment of host city Incheon, while Dnopi represents courage of the participating athletes and hope.
2018 Asian Para Games	Jakarta	Momo	Brahminy kite	The Brahminy kite is locally known as Bondol eagle. The name Momo is short for motivation and mobility. The mascot wears a Betawinese Belt with Sarong and Represents Jakarta city and strength.
2022 Asian Para Games	Hangzhou	Fei Fei	Character inspired by 'Divine Bird'	The mascot represents Hangzhou's heritage and its drive for technological innovation. According to a legend in the Liangzhu culture, the 'Divine Bird' brings bliss.
2026 Asian Para Games	Nagoya	Uzumin	Shachihoko	Uzumin reflects the hope that the athletes' passion will converge like a "whirlwind" in Aichi-Nagoya, and that the emotion born there will emerge like a spring and spread throughout Asia.

== Medal table ==
Of the 45 National Paralympic Committees participating throughout the history of the Games, 41 nations have won at least a single medal in the competition, leaving 4 nations: Afghanistan, Bangladesh, Bhutan, Maldives yet to win a single medal. 32 nations have won at least one gold medal and China became the only nation in history to emerge as overall champions.

Rank	Nation	Gold	Silver	Bronze	Total
1	China (CHN)	952	585	446	1,983
2	Japan (JPN)	221	267	292	780
3	South Korea (KOR)	211	221	230	662
4	Iran (IRI)	187	201	183	571
5	Uzbekistan (UZB)	126	104	106	336
6	Thailand (THA)	110	176	257	543
7	Indonesia (INA)	91	114	148	353
8	India (IND)	76	109	156	341
9	Malaysia (MAS)	54	77	102	233
10	Hong Kong (HKG)	37	69	102	208
11	Kazakhstan (KAZ)	32	51	73	156
12	Iraq (IRQ)	28	32	48	108
13	Chinese Taipei (TPE)	22	37	70	129
14	Vietnam (VIE)	22	31	57	110
15	Philippines (PHI)	22	23	27	72
16	United Arab Emirates (UAE)	17	29	22	68
17	Saudi Arabia (KSA)	15	20	9	44
18	Sri Lanka (SRI)	11	22	25	58
19	Jordan (JOR)	11	9	9	29
20	Mongolia (MGL)	9	11	19	39
21	Singapore (SIN)	7	13	20	40
22	Pakistan (PAK)	5	2	3	10
23	Oman (OMA)	4	8	2	14
24	Qatar (QAT)	3	3	5	11
25	Kuwait (KUW)	2	8	12	22
26	Timor-Leste (TLS)	2	3	1	6
27	Kyrgyzstan (KGZ)	2	2	1	5
28	Syria (SYR)	1	7	12	20
29	Myanmar (MYA)	1	6	16	23
30	Bahrain (BHR)	1	6	7	14
31	Palestine (PLE)	1	0	1	2
32	Laos (LAO)	1	0	0	1
33	Lebanon (LBN)	0	3	1	4
34	Brunei (BRU)	0	2	4	6
34	Macau (MAC)	0	2	4	6
34	Turkmenistan (TKM)	0	2	4	6
37	North Korea (PRK)	0	1	4	5
38	Korea (COR)	0	1	1	2
39	Tajikistan (TJK)	0	1	0	1
40	Cambodia (CAM)	0	0	1	1
40	Nepal (NEP)	0	0	1	1
40	Yemen (YEM)	0	0	1	1
Totals (42 entries)		2,284	2,258	2,482	7,024

== Asian Youth Para Games ==
The Asian Youth Para Games is a multi-sport event held every four years for youth athletes with physical disabilities. The first Games was held in 2009 in Tokyo, Japan. The Asian Youth Para Games superseded the FESPIC Youth Games which last held in 2003.

=== List of Youth Games ===
Host cities of the Asian Youth Para Games

Edition	Year	Host city	Host nation	Start Date	End Date	Nations	Competitors	Sports	Events	Top Placed Team
1	2009	Tokyo	Japan	10 September	13 September	24	466	5	219	Japan (JPN)
2	2013	Kuala Lumpur	Malaysia	26 October	30 October	29	723	14	235	Japan (JPN)
3	2017	Dubai	United Arab Emirates	10 December	14 December	30	800	7	252	Japan (JPN)
4	2021	Manama	Bahrain	2 December	6 December	30	750	9	224	Iran (IRI)
5	2025	Dubai	United Arab Emirates	7 December	14 December	35	1,312	11	496	Uzbekistan (UZB)
6	2029	Phnom Penh	Cambodia	Future event						

=== Ranking ===
Year	Ranking by Medals		
Year	1	2	3
2009	Japan	Iran	China
2013	Japan	Iran	China
2017	Japan	Iran	China
2021	Iran	Thailand	Japan
2025	Uzbekistan	Iran	Japan

=== Youth Games Sports ===
- Archery (2013, 2025)
- Arm wrestling (2025)
- Athletics (Since 2009)
- Badminton (since 2009)
- Boccia (since 2009)
- Bowling (2013)
- Chess (2013)
- Cycling
- Goalball (since 2013)
- Judo (2013)
- Paracanoe
- Powerlifting (since 2013, 2025)
- Rowing
- Swimming (since 2009)
- Table tennis (since 2009)
- Taekwondo (since 2021)
- Sitting volleyball (2013)
- Wheelchair tennis (2013)
- Wheelchair basketball (2013, 2021, 2025)

=== All-time Youth Games medal table (2009–2025) ===
Rank	Nation	Gold	Silver	Bronze	Total
1	Japan (JPN)	227	114	104	445
2	Iran (IRI)	216	230	205	651
3	Uzbekistan (UZB)	166	92	62	320
4	Thailand (THA)	123	105	87	315
5	China (CHN)	81	26	17	124
6	Indonesia (INA)	75	68	59	202
7	South Korea (KOR)	73	56	68	197
8	India (IND)	69	64	68	201
9	Iraq (IRQ)	58	44	46	148
10	Kazakhstan (KAZ)	52	54	39	145
11	Hong Kong (HKG)	49	43	30	122
12	Malaysia (MAS)	37	33	43	113
13	Chinese Taipei (TPE)	31	27	15	73
14	United Arab Emirates (UAE)	26	20	15	61
15	Saudi Arabia (KSA)	25	29	28	82
16	Vietnam (VIE)	19	9	5	33
17	Singapore (SIN)	16	19	12	47
18	Jordan (JOR)	15	9	6	30
19	Philippines (PHI)	10	17	21	48
20	Sri Lanka (SRI)	9	8	5	22
21	Kuwait (KUW)	8	12	4	24
22	Kyrgyzstan (KGZ)	7	0	3	10
23	Bahrain (BHR)	6	12	8	26
24	Cambodia (CAM)	4	5	3	12
25	North Korea (PRK)	4	3	1	8
26	Pakistan (PAK)	4	2	7	13
27	Myanmar (MYA)	3	4	4	11
28	Mongolia (MGL)	3	4	2	9
29	Bangladesh (BAN)	3	0	1	4
30	Palestine (PLE)	2	3	0	5
31	Tajikistan (TJK)	1	3	3	7
32	Oman (OMA)	1	3	1	5
33	Nepal (NEP)	1	2	2	5
34	Syria (SYR)	1	1	1	3
35	Yemen (YEM)	1	0	1	2
36	Brunei (BRU)	1	0	0	1
37	Lebanon (LIB)	0	2	0	2
38	Macau (MAC)	0	1	2	3
39	Bhutan (BHU)	0	0	3	3
40	Maldives (MDV)	0	0	1	1
Totals (40 entries)		1,427	1,124	982	3,533

== See also ==
- Asian Games
- Paralympic Games
  - African Para Games
  - European Para Championships
  - Parapan American Games
