= Bowling at the Asian Para Games =

Bowling events have been contested at every Asian Para Games since 2010 Asian Para Games in Guangzhou, China.

== Editions ==
Games	Year	Host city	Best nation
I	2010	Guangzhou, China	South Korea
II	2014	Incheon, South Korea	South Korea
III	2018	Jakarta, Indonesia	South Korea

== Medal table ==
Rank	Nation	Gold	Silver	Bronze	Total
1	South Korea (KOR)	28	14	7	49
2	Chinese Taipei (TPE)	5	9	10	24
3	Malaysia (MAS)	4	7	11	22
4	Philippines (PHI)	1	2	0	3
5	Hong Kong (HKG)	1	1	1	3
6	Indonesia (INA)	1	1	0	2
7	Japan (JPN)	0	5	1	6
8	Singapore (SIN)	0	1	5	6
9	Thailand (THA)	0	0	6	6
10	Brunei (BRU)	0	0	1	1
Totals (10 entries)		40	40	42	122
