= Badminton at the Asian Para Games =

Badminton events have been contested at every Asian Para Games since 2010 Asian Games in Guangzhou.

== Editions ==
Games	Year	Host city	Best nation	Events
I	2010	Guangzhou, China	Malaysia	13
II	2014	Incheon, South Korea	South Korea	15
III	2018	Jakarta, Indonesia	China	19
IV	2022	Hangzhou, China	China	22
V	2026	Aichi-Nagoya, Japan	China	22

== Medals (2010-2026) ==
Rank	Nation	Gold	Silver	Bronze	Total
1	China (CHN)	33	18	29	80
2	Indonesia (INA)	19	20	19	58
3	India (IND)	11	13	29	53
4	South Korea (KOR)	9	16	17	42
5	Malaysia (MAS)	6	5	14	25
6	Japan (JPN)	6	2	16	24
7	Hong Kong (HKG)	3	2	5	10
8	Thailand (THA)	2	11	18	31
9	Vietnam (VIE)	2	0	4	6
10	Chinese Taipei (TPE)	0	3	6	9
11	Sri Lanka (SRI)	0	1	0	1
Totals (11 entries)		91	91	157	339

== Active events ==
=== Men's singles WH1 ===
Event	Gold	Silver	Bronze
2022 Hangzhou	Qu Zimo; China	Choi Jung-man; South Korea	Yang Tong; China
2022 Hangzhou	Qu Zimo; China	Choi Jung-man; South Korea	Muhammad Ikhwan Ramli; Malaysia
2026 Aichi-Nagoya	Qu Zimo; China	Park Hae-seong; South Korea	Choi Jung-man; South Korea
2026 Aichi-Nagoya	Qu Zimo; China	Park Hae-seong; South Korea	Jin Gi-beom; South Korea

=== Men's singles WH2 ===
Event	Gold	Silver	Bronze
2022 Hangzhou	Daiki Kajiwara; Japan	Yu Soo-young; South Korea	Chan Ho Yuen; Hong Kong
2022 Hangzhou	Daiki Kajiwara; Japan	Yu Soo-young; South Korea	Kim Jung-jun; South Korea
2026 Aichi-Nagoya	Daiki Kajiwara; Japan	Yu Soo-young; South Korea	Wu Xincheng; China
2026 Aichi-Nagoya	Daiki Kajiwara; Japan	Yu Soo-young; South Korea	Mai Jianpeng; China

== See also ==
- Badminton at the Summer Paralympics
- Badminton at the Asian Games
