= Thailand at the Asian Para Games =

- IOC code: THA
- NPC: Paralympic Committee of Thailand
- Medals Ranked 5th: Gold 91 Silver 132 Bronze 191 Total 414

Asian Para Games appearances (overview)
- 2010; 2014; 2018; 2022; 2026

Youth appearances
- 2009; 2013; 2017; 2021

Thailand has competed at every celebration of the Asian Para Games, Thai athletes have won a total of 41 gold medals (5th out of 42) and 200 overall medals (4th out of 42) at the Asian Para Games.

== Asian Para Games ==
=== Medals by Games ===
Games	Gold	Silver	Bronze	Total	Rank
(China) Guangzhou 2010	20	34	39	93	5
(South Korea) Incheon 2014	21	39	47	107	6
(Indonesia) Jakarta 2018	23	33	50	106	7
(China) Hangzhou 2022	27	26	55	108	7
(Japan) Nagoya 2026	19	40	66	125	7
Total	110	172	257	539	5

=== Medals by sport ===
Games	Gold	Silver	Bronze	Total
Archery	1	1	2	4
Athletics	48	63	65	176
Badminton	2	11	18	31
Boccia	15	7	10	32
Bowling	0	0	6	6
Canoeing	0	1	0	1
Cycling	1	9	5	15
Football 5-a-side	0	0	1	1
Go	0	1	0	1
Goalball	0	0	1	1
Judo	0	4	3	7
Lawn bowls	4	1	3	8
Powerlifting	3	3	7	13
Rowing	0	0	2	2
Shooting	6	8	5	19
Swimming	6	26	55	87
Table tennis	12	19	39	70
Taekwondo	1	1	3	5
Wheelchair basketball	0	0	3	3
Wheelchair fencing	8	14	21	43
Wheelchair rugby	0	0	1	1
Wheelchair tennis	3	3	7	13
Total	110	172	257	539

== Asian Youth Para Games ==
=== Medals by Games ===
Games	Gold	Silver	Bronze	Total	Rank
(Japan) Tokyo 2009	13	16	3	32	5
(Malaysia) Kuala Lumpur 2013	16	11	9	36	6
(United Arab Emirates) Dubai 2017	19	15	19	53	5
(Bahrain) Manama 2021	Future event				
Total	48	42	31	121	4

=== Medals by Sport ===
Games	Gold	Silver	Bronze	Total
Athletics	9	6	3	18
Boccia	3	2	2	7
Swimming	3	2	1	6
Table tennis	1	1	2	4
Wheelchair tennis	0	0	1	1
Total	16	11	9	36

== ASEAN Para Games ==
=== Medals by Games ===
Games	Gold	Silver	Bronze	Total	Rank
(Malaysia) Kuala Lumpur 2001	119	65	20	204	2
(Vietnam) Hanoi 2003	101	61	31	193	1
(Philippines) Manila 2005	139	64	28	231	1
(Thailand) Nakhon Ratchasima 2008	256	109	84	449	1
(Malaysia) Kuala Lumpur 2009	157	75	57	289	1
(Indonesia) Surakarta 2011	126	96	73	295	1
(Myanmar) Naypyidaw 2014	96	82	70	248	2
Singapore 2015	95	76	79	250	1
(Malaysia) Kuala Lumpur 2017	68	73	95	236	3
(Philippines) Manila 2020	Future event				
(Indonesia) Surakarta 2022	Future event				
(Cambodia) Phnom Penh 2023	Future event				
Total	1,157	701	537	2,395	1

== See also ==
- Olympics
  - Thailand at the Olympics
  - Thailand at the Youth Olympics
- Paralympic
  - Thailand at the Paralympics
- Asian Games
  - Thailand at the Asian Games
- Other
  - Thailand at the Universiade
  - Thailand at the World Games
