= Malaysia at the Asian Para Games =

- IPC code: MAS
- NPC: Paralympic Council of Malaysia
- Website: www.paralympic.org.my (in English)
- Medals: Gold 54 Silver 77 Bronze 102 Total 233

Asian Para Games appearances (overview)
- 2010; 2014; 2018; 2022; 2026

Malaysia has competed at every iteration of the Asian Para Games which was first held in Guangzhou, China.

== Asian Para Games ==
=== Medals by Games ===
Games	Rank	Gold	Silver	Bronze	Total
(China) 2010 Guangzhou	6	9	8	20	37
(South Korea) 2014 Incheon	7	15	20	27	62
(Indonesia) 2018 Jakarta	8	17	26	25	68
(China) 2022 Hangzhou	12	7	15	17	39
(Japan) 2026 Aichi-Nagoya	12	6	8	13	27
Total		54	77	102	233

=== Medals by sports ===
Sport	Gold	Silver	Bronze	Total
Athletics	24	21	22	67
Cycling	7	17	13	37
Swimming	6	11	18	35
Badminton	6	2	14	22
Bowling	4	7	11	22
Lawn bowls	2	9	8	19
Powerlifting	2	4	4	10
Boccia	1	3	1	5
Sailing	1	1	1	3
Table tennis	1	0	6	7
Wheelchair fencing	0	1	2	3
Wheelchair tennis	0	1	0	1
Archery	0	0	1	1
Wheelchair rugby	0	0	1	1
Totals (14 entries)	54	77	102	233

== Asian Youth Para Games ==
Malaysia at the Asian Youth Para Games
- IPC code: MAS
- NPC: Paralympic Council of Malaysia
- Website: www.paralympic.org.my (in English)
- Medals Ranked 10th: Gold 32 Silver 34 Bronze 35 Total 101

Asian Youth Para Games appearances
- 2009; 2013; 2017; 2021

=== Medals by Games ===
*Red border color indicates tournament was held on home soil.

Games	Rank	Gold	Silver	Bronze	Total
(Japan) 2009 Tokyo	12	5	7	10	22
(Malaysia) 2013 Kuala Lumpur	4	19	22	18	59
(United Arab Emirates) 2017 Dubai	15	5	1	2	8
(Bahrain) 2021 Manama	13	3	4	5	12
(Uzbekistan) 2025 Tashkent	Future event				
Total	10	32	34	35	101

=== Medals by sports ===
(2013) (2017) (2021)

Sport	Gold	Silver	Bronze	Total
Athletics	16	13	11	40
Table tennis	4	2	2	8
Chess	2	3	1	6
Badminton	2	2	0	4
Powerlifting	1	1	4	6
Boccia	0	2	1	3
Archery	0	1	2	3
Bowling	0	1	2	3
Wheelchair basketball	0	1	0	1
Totals (9 entries)	25	26	23	74

== See also ==
- Malaysia at the Paralympics
- Malaysia at the Deaflympics
- Malaysia at the Asian Games
