= Iran at the Asian Para Games =

- IOC code: IRI
- NPC: I.R. Iran National Paralympic Committee
- Medals Ranked 4th: Gold 185 Silver 201 Bronze 183 Total 569

Asian Para Games appearances (overview)
- 2010; 2014; 2018; 2022; 2026

Youth appearances
- 2009; 2013; 2017; 2021

Iran first participated at the Asian Para Games in 2010 and Asian Youth Para Games in 2009, and has sent athletes to compete in every Asian Para Games and Asian Youth Para Games since then. The National Paralympic Committee for Iran is the I.R. Iran National Paralympic Committee.

== Asian Para Games ==
=== Competitors ===
1. 2010: 156 in 14 sports
2. 2014: 200 in 16 sports
3. 2018: 210 in 13 sports
4. 2022: 209 in 16 sports
5. 2026: 162 in 15 sports

=== Medals by Games ===
Games	Rank	Gold	Silver	Bronze	Total
2010 Guangzhou	4	27	24	29	80
2014 Incheon	4	37	52	31	120
2018 Jakarta	3	51	43	42	136
2022 Hangzhou	2	44	46	41	131
2026 Aichi-Nagoya	6	26	36	40	102
Total	4	185	201	183	569

- Due to positive doping tests for Iran and India and others in 2022, 4 medal stripped from Iran and was added 2 medal to Iran, so number of Iran medals is 129.

=== Medals by Sports ===
Games	Gold	Silver	Bronze	Total
Archery	13	4	7	24
Athletics	83	89	66	238
Cycling Road	0	0	2	2
Cycling Track	0	0	1	1
Judo	7	8	11	26
Powerlifting	13	17	8	38
Shooting	7	5	3	15
Swimming	13	16	19	48
Table tennis	0	2	5	7
Wheelchair basketball	1	0	3	4
Football 5-a-side	1	2	0	3
Chess	8	13	8	29
Goalball	2	1	4	7
Football 7-a-side	2	0	0	2
Sitting volleyball	4	3	1	8
Taekwondo	3	4	3	10
Canoeing	2	1	2	5
Total (17 Sports)	159	165	143	467

== Asian Youth Para Games ==
=== Competitors ===
1. 2009: 50 in 5 sports
2. 2013: 74 in 9 sports
3. 2017: 114 in 7 sports
4. 2021: 120 in 10 sports
5. 2025: 194 in 11 sports

=== Medals by Games ===
Games	Rank	Gold	Silver	Bronze	Total
2009 Tokyo	2	26	24	18	68
2013 Kuala Lumpur	2	27	13	19	59
2017 Dubai	2	39	44	35	118
2021 Manama	1	51	58	35	144
2025 Dubai	2	76	96	90	262
Total	2	209	235	197	651

- In Iranian sources, the number of medals in 2009 is mentioned as follows: 27 G, 25 S, 17 B , Total 69.
- In Iranian sources, the number of medals in 2013 is mentioned 59 or 60 medals: 27 G, 12 S, 20 B , Total 59 or 60.
- A medal from 2017 should be deducted due to a positive doping to 117.
- 2021 was revised.

=== Medals by Sports ===
Games	Gold	Silver	Bronze	Total
Archery	0	0	0	0
Athletics	0	0	0	0
Judo	0	0	0	0
Powerlifting	0	0	0	0
Shooting	0	0	0	0
Swimming	0	0	0	0
Table tennis	0	0	0	0
Wheelchair basketball	0	0	0	0
Chess	0	0	0	0
Goalball	0	0	0	0
Sitting volleyball	0	0	0	0
Taekwondo	0	0	0	0
Total (- Sports)	0	0	0	0

== Total ==
Games	Rank	Gold	Silver	Bronze	Total
Asian Para Games (2010-2026)	4	185	201	183	569
Asian Youth Para Games (2009-2025)	2	209	235	197	651
Total	-	404	436	380	1220

== See also ==
- Iran at the Asian Games
- Iran at the Paralympics
- Iran at the Olympics
- Iran at the Deaflympics
- Iran at the FESPIC Games
- Iran at the INAS Global Games
- Iran at the Islamic Solidarity Games
- Iran at the Universiade
