= National Paralympic Committee of China =

National Paralympic Committee of the United Kingdom

National Paralympic Committee
- Country: China
- Code: CHN
- Created: 1983
- Continental association: APC
- President: Cheng Kai
- Website: www.paralympic.org/people-s-republic-china

The National Paralympic Committee of China is the National Paralympic Committee for China, and is responsible for the country's participation in the Paralympic Games, and was founded in 1983. Cheng Kai is the president of the committee.

== See also ==
- China at the Paralympics
- Chinese Olympic Committee
