= Chinese Taipei at the Asian Games =

- IOC code: TPE
- NOC: Chinese Taipei Olympic Committee
- Medals Ranked 10th: Gold 123 Silver 181 Bronze 337 Total 641

Summer appearances
- 1954; 1958; 1962; 1966; 1970; 1974–1986; 1990; 1994; 1998; 2002; 2006; 2010; 2014; 2018; 2022; 2026

Winter appearances
- 1990; 1996; 1999; 2003; 2007; 2011; 2017; 2025; 2029

Taiwan, officially the Republic of China (ROC), first competed at the Asian Games in 1954 and continued participating at the games under various names. Due to political factors, the ROC delegation was refused to participate in the 1962 Asian Games by host Indonesian government. In 1973, the People's Republic of China (PRC) applied for participation in the Asian Games. The PRC's application was approved by the Asian Games Federation and the ROC was expelled.

After a settlement on the membership in the International Olympic Committee, Taiwan started competing as "Chinese Taipei" (TPE) at the Olympics. The membership of Chinese Taipei Olympic Committee was granted by the Olympic Council of Asia in 1986 and the Chinese Taipei delegation has been in the Asian Games since 1990.

== Asian Games ==
=== Medals by Games ===
Games	Rank	Gold	Silver	Bronze	Total
(Philippines) 1954 Manila	6	2	4	7	13
(Japan) 1958 Tokyo	5	6	11	17	34
(Indonesia) 1962 Jakarta	did not participate				
(Thailand) 1966 Bangkok	8	5	4	10	19
(Thailand) 1970 Bangkok	12	1	5	12	18
(Iran) 1974 Tehran	did not participate				
(Thailand) 1978 Bangkok	did not participate				
(India) 1982 New Delhi	did not participate				
(South Korea) 1986 Seoul	did not participate				
(China) 1990 Beijing	16	0	10	21	31
(Japan) 1994 Hiroshima	7	7	13	24	44
(Thailand) 1998 Bangkok	6	19	17	41	77
(South Korea) 2002 Busan	8	10	17	25	52
(Qatar) 2006 Doha	10	9	10	27	46
(China) 2010 Guangzhou	7	13	16	38	67
(South Korea) 2014 Incheon	9	10	18	23	51
(Indonesia) 2018 Jakarta-Palembang	7	17	19	31	67
(China) 2022 Hangzhou	6	19	20	28	67
(Japan) 2026 Aichi-Nagoya	15	5	17	33	55
(Qatar) 2030 Doha	future event				
(Saudi Arabia) 2034 Riyadh	future event				
Total	10	123	181	337	641

=== Medals by sport ===
Sport	Rank	Gold	Silver	Bronze	Total
Archery	5	3	9	10	22
Athletics	16	8	21	28	57
Badminton	9	1	1	8	10
Baseball	2	1	4	4	9
Basketball	6	1	3	2	6
Bowling	4	9	6	9	24
Boxing	14	3	4	5	12
Bridge	2	2	3	1	6
Canoeing	6	2	7	3	12
Cue sports	1	8	5	8	21
Cycling	10	3	5	14	22
Diving	11	0	0	2	2
Dragon boat	3	2	1	0	3
Equestrian	13	0	2	2	4
Esports	4	0	3	5	8
Football	8	2	0	1	3
Go	3	1	0	1	2
Golf	3	7	4	10	21
Gymnastics	7	3	1	11	15
Handball	10	0	0	1	1
Judo	8	2	4	21	27
Kabaddi	5	0	1	4	5
Karate	6	7	6	22	35
Kurash	10	0	2	4	6
Roller sports	1	13	8	6	27
Rowing	12	0	4	2	6
Rugby union	6	0	1	2	3
Sailing	13	0	1	0	1
Shooting	9	6	8	10	24
Soft tennis	3	9	15	19	43
Softball	3	0	4	6	10
Swimming	13	2	4	14	20
Table tennis	7	1	4	23	28
Taekwondo	4	12	13	22	47
Tennis	6	10	10	14	34
Volleyball	7	0	0	5	5
Weightlifting	7	4	12	20	36
Wushu	12	1	5	17	23
Xiangqi	3	0	0	1	1
Total	10	123	181	337	641

== Asian Winter Games ==
=== Medals by Games ===
Games	Rank	Gold	Silver	Bronze	Total
(Japan) 1986 Sapporo	0	0	0	0	0
(Japan) 1990 Sapporo	0	0	0	0	0
(China) 1996 Harbin	0	0	0	0	0
(South Korea) 1999 Gangwon	0	0	0	0	0
(Japan) 2003 Aomori	0	0	0	0	0
(China) 2007 Changchun	0	0	0	0	0
(Kazakhstan) 2011 Astana & Almaty	0	0	0	0	0
(Japan) 2017 Sapporo & Obihiro	0	0	0	0	0
(China) 2025 Harbin	8	0	0	1	1
(Kazakhstan) 2029 Almaty	future event				
Total	11	0	0	1	1

== Asian Para Games ==
=== Medals by Games ===
Games	Rank	Gold	Silver	Bronze	Total
(China) 2010 Guangzhou	8	8	7	11	26
(South Korea) 2014 Incheon	14	4	10	24	38
(Indonesia) 2018 Jakarta	17	2	9	14	25
(China) 2022 Hangzhou	13	4	4	12	20
(Japan) 2026 Aichi-Nagoya	13	4	7	9	20
(Qatar) 2030 Doha
(Saudi Arabia) 2034 Riyadh
Total	13	20	37	70	129

=== Medals by sport ===
Sport	Rank	Gold	Silver	Bronze	Total
Archery	11	0	0	1	1
Athletics	21	2	5	13	16
Badminton	10	0	3	6	9
Board games	–	0	0	1	1
Bowling	2	5	9	10	24
Dancesport	3	0	2	2	4
Judo	11	0	2	3	5
Powerlifting	8	1	0	2	3
Swimming	10	5	3	6	14
Table tennis	7	6	14	21	41
Taekwondo	7	2	0	0	2
Wheelchair tennis	6	0	0	5	5
Total	13	22	37	70	129

== Asian Beach Games ==
=== Medals by Games ===
Games	Rank	Gold	Silver	Bronze	Total
(Indonesia) 2008 Bali	11	2	2	3	7
(Oman) 2010 Muscat	18	0	1	4	5
(China) 2012 Haiyang	5	3	6	6	15
(Thailand) 2014 Phuket	12	3	8	6	17
(Vietnam) 2016 Danang	18	2	4	10	16
Total	12	10	21	29	60

== Asian Indoor and Martial Arts Games ==
=== Medals by Games ===
Games	Rank	Gold	Silver	Bronze	Total
Asian Indoor Games
(Thailand) 2005 Bangkok	9	5	5	3	13
2007 Macau	10	4	2	6	12
(Vietnam) 2009 Hanoi	14	3	5	15	23
Asian Martial Arts Games
(Thailand) 2009 Bangkok	9	4	5	11	20
Asian Indoor and Martial Arts Games
(South Korea) 2013 Incheon	7	3	5	12	20
(Turkmenistan) 2017 Ashgabat	12	9	7	12	28
(Thailand) 2021 Bangkok–Chonburi	cancelled				
Total	12	28	29	59	116

== Asian Youth Games ==
=== Medals by Games ===
Games	Rank	Gold	Silver	Bronze	Total
2009 Singapore	12	1	2	7	10
(China) 2013 Nanjing	5	6	11	13	30
2017 Hambantota	cancelled due to the COVID-19 pandemic				
2021 Surabaya	cancelled due to the COVID-19 pandemic				
(Bahrain) 2025 Manama	10	7	9	24	40
(Cambodia) 2029 Phnom Penh	future event				
Total	11	14	22	44	80

== Asian Youth Para Games ==
=== Medals by Games ===
Games	Rank	Gold	Silver	Bronze	Total
(Japan) 2009 Tokyo	9	7	3	1	11
(Malaysia) 2013 Kuala Lumpur	14	4	5	2	11
(United Arab Emirates) 2017 Dubai	did not participate				
(Bahrain) 2021 Manama	11	6	3	4	13
(United Arab Emirates) 2025 Dubai	10	14	16	8	38
Total	13	31	27	15	73

== East Asian Games ==
=== Medals by Games ===
Games	Rank	Gold	Silver	Bronze	Total
(China) 1993 Shanghai	5	6	5	19	30
(South Korea) 1997 Busan	5	8	22	19	49
(Japan) 2001 Osaka	5	6	16	31	53
2005 Macau	4	12	34	26	72
2009 Hong Kong	5	8	34	47	89
(China) 2013 Tianjin	4	17	28	46	91
Total	4	57	139	188	384

== East Asian Youth Games ==
=== Medals by Games ===
*Red border color indicates tournament was held on home soil.

Games	Rank	Gold	Silver	Bronze	Total
(Chinese Taipei) 2019 Taichung	cancelled				
(Mongolia) 2023 Ulaanbaatar	4	11	10	21	42
(South Korea) 2027 Jeonju	future event				
Total	4	11	10	21	42
