= Philippines at the Asian Para Games =

- IOC code: PHI
- NPC: Paralympic Committee of the Philippines
- Medals Ranked 14th: Gold 22 Silver 23 Bronze 27 Total 72

Asian Para Games appearances (overview)
- 2010; 2014; 2018; 2022; 2026

Youth appearances
- 2009; 2013; 2017; 2021; 2025

The Philippines has competed at every iteration of the Asian Para Games which was first held in Guangzhou, China. The Philippines has won a total of 65 medals in its participation in the Asian Para Games as of the 2022 edition; 20 of which are gold, 21 of which are silver, and 24 of which are bronze. The Philippines recently participated in the fourth edition of the Games in Hangzhou, China from October 22–28, 2023.

== Asian Para Games ==
=== Medals by edition ===
Games	Athletes	Gold	Silver	Bronze	Total	Rank
(China) 2010 Guangzhou	35	0	4	3	7	21
(South Korea) 2014 Incheon	40	0	5	5	10	24
(Indonesia) 2018 Jakarta	57	10	8	11	29	11
(China) 2022 Hangzhou	73	10	4	5	19	9
(Japan) 2026 Nagoya	69	2	2	3	7	17
(Qatar) 2030 Doha	Future event					
(Saudi Arabia) 2034 Riyadh	Future event					
Total	-	22	23	27	72	14

=== Medals by sports ===
Sport	Gold	Silver	Bronze	Total
Chess	13	5	8	26
Swimming	6	4	10	20
Athletics	1	3	4	8
Bowling	1	2	0	3
Cycling	1	0	3	4
Powerlifting	0	5	1	6
Table Tennis	0	3	1	4
Wheelchair Dancesport	0	1	0	1
Totals (8 entries)	22	23	27	72

== Asian Youth Para Games ==
=== Medals by edition ===
Games	Athletes	Gold	Silver	Bronze	Total	Rank
(Japan) 2009 Tokyo	Did not participate					
(Malaysia) 2013 Kuala Lumpur	-	1	1	5	7	18
(United Arab Emirates) 2017 Dubai	17	0	0	1	1	21
(Bahrain) 2021 Manama	20	1	6	2	9	17
(Uzbekistan) 2025 Tashkent	49	8	10	13	31	13
Total	-	10	17	21	48	19

=== Medals by sports ===
Sport	Gold	Silver	Bronze	Total
Swimming	7	9	4	20
Athletics	3	6	5	14
Table Tennis	0	3	8	11
Badminton	0	1	0	1
Boccia	0	1	0	1
Archery	0	0	1	1
Totals (6 entries)	10	20	18	48

== See also ==
- Philippines at the Asian Games
