= Malaysia at the 2017 Asian Youth Para Games =

- IPC code: MAS
- NPC: Malaysian Paralympic Council

in Dubai 10–14 December 2017
- Competitors: 12 in 5 sports
- Flag bearer: S. Thavanesvaran
- Medals Ranked 15th: Gold 5 Silver 1 Bronze 2 Total 8

Asian Youth Para Games appearances
- 2009; 2013; 2017; 2021

Malaysia participated at the 2017 Asian Youth Para Games which was held in Dubai, United Arab Emirates from 10 to 14 December 2017. Malaysia contingent had 12 athletes competed in five sports and was led by chef de mission, Siti Zaharah Abdul Khalid.

Malaysia won five gold, one silver and two bronze medal, placing 15th among 30 nations.

== Medalists ==
Medal	Name	Sport	Event
Gold	Eddy Bernard	Athletics	Boys' 100 m T38
Gold	Eddy Bernard	Athletics	Boys' long jump T35/38
Gold	Wan Nur Azri Wan Azman	Powerlifting	Boys' 97kg
Gold	Chee Chaoming	Table tennis	Boys' single SM9
Gold	Chee Chaoming; Ahmad Syahir Mohamad Kamal Saupi	Table tennis	Boys' team SM9-10
Silver	Ahmad Syahir Mohamad Kamal Saupi	Table tennis	Boys' single SM10
Bronze	Muhammad Zulhaizat Zainal Abidin	Athletics	Boys' 200m T13
Bronze	Muhammad Zulhaizat Zainal Abidin	Athletics	Boys' 400m T13

Medals by sport
Sport	1st place, gold medalist(s)	2nd place, silver medalist(s)	3rd place, bronze medalist(s)	Total
Athletics	2	0	2	4
Powerlifting	1	0	0	1
Table tennis	2	1	0	3
Total	5	1	2	8

== Athletics ==
Five sportspeople competed in athletics for the Malaysia:

- Eddy Bernard
- Jacklon Ganding
- S. Thavanesvaran
- Muhammad Zulhaizat Zainal Abidin
- Felicia Mikat

== Badminton ==
Malaysia had a sole competitor in badminton

- Muhammad Zulfatihi Jaafar.

== Powerlifting ==
Two players took part in the powerlifting for the Malaysia.

- Wan Nur Azri Wan Azman
- Siti Nuraisyah Sahrin

== Swimming ==
Malaysia had a sole competitor in swimming

- Carmen Lim.

== Table tennis ==
Three players took part in the table tennis for the Malaysia.

- Chee Chaoming
- Ahmad Syahir Kamal Saupi
- Gloria Gracia Wong Sze

== See also ==
- Malaysia at the 2017 Asian Indoor and Martial Arts Games
- Malaysia at the 2017 ASEAN Para Games
