= 2017 Asian Youth Games =

Multi-sport event

The 2017 Asian Youth Games were to be an international multi-sport event. Initially planned to be hosted by the city of Hambantota, Sri Lanka, a new host for the 2017 AYG were to be decided at a future Olympic Council of Asia general assembly after Sri Lanka lost its hosting rights. It has now been decided to postpone until 2021 in Shantou, China, but was eventually cancelled due to COVID-19 pandemic in China.

== Bidding ==
Hambantota decided on bidding for the games after losing the vote to stage the 2018 Commonwealth Games which were eventually awarded to the Gold Coast in Australia. On 15 June 2012, the president of the Olympic Council of Asia Ahmed Al-Fahad Al-Ahmed Al-Sabah announced that Hambantota had been chosen as the host of the games. Indonesia, Qatar, Thailand, the United Arab Emirates, Uzbekistan also bid to stage the games but were ultimately unsuccessful.

Sri Lanka was stripped of its hosting rights by OCA due to political interference of its government with its national Olympic committee. Indonesia was offered by OCA to take over as hosts and the games were suggested test event for the 2018 Asian Games. Sri Lanka's replacement was set to be decided at an OCA general assembly scheduled in September 2015, but it has now been decided to postpone the event for 4 years as no replacement host city was found.
