= India at the Asian Para Games =

- IOC code: IND
- NOC: Paralympic Committee of India
- Website: Paralympic India
- Medals Ranked 7th: Gold 76 Silver 109 Bronze 156 Total 341

Asian Para Games appearances (overview)
- 2010; 2014; 2018; 2022; 2026

India is a member of the South Asian Zone of the Olympic Council of Asia, and participates in the Asian Para Games. The Paralympic Committee of India is recognised by the International Paralympic Committee.

India was one of the first five founding members of the Asian Games Federation on 13 February 1949, in New Delhi. It disbanded on 26 November 1981 and was replaced by the Olympic Council of Asia.

== Medal table ==
Games	Host	Rank	(gold) Gold	(silver) Silver	(bronze) Bronze	Total
2010 Guangzhou	China	15	1	4	9	14
2014 Incheon	South Korea	15	3	14	16	33
2018 Jakarta	Indonesia	9	15	24	33	72
2022 Hangzhou	China	6	27	32	49	108
2026 Aichi–Nagoya	Japan	4	30	35	49	114
Total		7	76	109	156	341

== See also ==
- India at the Olympics
- India at the Deaflympics
- India at the Youth Olympics
- India at the World Games
- India at the Asian Games
- India at the Asian Youth Games
- India at the Commonwealth Games
- India at the Lusofonia Games
- India at the South Asian Games
