= Hong Kong at the Asian Games =

- IOC code: HKG
- NOC: Sports Federation and Olympic Committee of Hong Kong, China
- Medals Ranked 15th: Gold 57 Silver 115 Bronze 166 Total 338

Summer appearances
- 1954; 1958; 1962; 1966; 1970; 1974; 1978; 1982; 1986; 1990; 1994; 1998; 2002; 2006; 2010; 2014; 2018; 2022; 2026

Winter appearances
- 1986; 1990; 1996; 1999; 2003; 2007; 2011; 2017; 2025; 2029

Hong Kong first competed at the Asian Games in 1954.

== Asian Games ==
=== Medals by Games ===
Games	Rank	Gold	Silver	Bronze	Total
1954 Asian Games	12	0	0	1	1
1958 Asian Games	13	0	1	1	2
1962 Asian Games	12	0	0	1	1
1966 Asian Games	16	0	0	1	1
1970 Asian Games		0	0	0	0
1974 Asian Games		0	0	0	0
1978 Asian Games	17	0	2	3	5
1982 Asian Games	20	0	0	1	1
1986 Asian Games	10	1	1	3	5
1990 Asian Games	17	0	2	5	7
1994 Asian Games	21	0	5	7	12
1998 Asian Games	13	5	6	6	17
2002 Asian Games	16	4	6	11	21
2006 Asian Games	15	6	12	11	29
2010 Asian Games	11	8	15	17	40
2014 Asian Games	13	6	12	25	43
2018 Asian Games	13	8	18	20	46
2022 Asian Games	12	8	16	29	53
2026 Asian Games	9	11	19	24	54
2030 Asian Games	Future event				
2034 Asian Games	Future event				
Total	16	57	115	166	338

== Asian Para Games ==
=== Medals by Games ===
Games	Rank	Gold	Silver	Bronze	Total
2010 Asian Para Games	9	5	9	14	28
2014 Asian Para Games	8	10	15	19	44
2018 Asian Para Games	10	11	16	21	48
2022 Asian Para Games	10	8	15	24	47
Total	10	34	55	78	167

=== Medals by Sports ===
Sport	Gold	Silver	Bronze	Total
Archery	0	1	1	2
Athletics	0	3	6	9
Badminton	3	2	4	9
Boccia	4	4	8	16
Lawn Bowls	6	9	6	21
Para Dance Sport	1	1	1	3
Para Sailing	0	0	1	1
Para Tenpin Bowling	1	1	1	3
Rowing	0	1	3	4
Swimming	7	11	7	25
Table Tennis	4	6	18	28
Wheelchair Fencing	8	16	22	46
Total	34	55	78	167

== Asian Beach Games ==
=== Medals by Games ===
Games	Rank	Gold	Silver	Bronze	Total
2008 Bali	6	3	3	2	8
2010 Muscat	19	0	1	3	4
2012 Haiyang		0	0	0	0
2014 Phuket	13	3	2	7	12
2016 Danang	28	0	4	4	8
Total	18	6	10	16	32

== Asian Indoor and Martial Arts Games ==
=== Medals by Games ===
Games	Rank	Gold	Silver	Bronze	Total
Asian Indoor Games
2005 Bangkok	4	12	9	5	26
2007 Macau	3	15	9	11	35
2009 Hanoi	8	6	9	17	32
Asian Martial Arts Games
2009 Bangkok	24	0	2	3	5
Asian Indoor and Martial Arts Games
2013 Incheon	8	3	4	10	17
2017 Ashgabat	10	10	11	14	35
Total	6	46	41	60	147

== Asian Youth Games ==
=== Medals by Games ===
Games	Rank	Gold	Silver	Bronze	Total
2009 Singapore	5	5	8	5	18
2013 Nanjing	11	2	5	13	20
2021 Surabaya	Future event				
Total	8	7	13	18	38

== Asian Youth Para Games ==
=== Medals by Games ===
Games	Rank	Gold	Silver	Bronze	Total
2009 Tokyo	5	17	5	7	29
2013 Kuala Lumpur	8	15	10	7	32
2017 Dubai	11	8	13	4	25
Total	8	40	28	18	86

== East Asian Games ==
*Red border color indicates tournament was held on home soil.

=== Medals by Games ===
Games	Rank	Gold	Silver	Bronze	Total
1993 Shanghai	6	1	2	8	11
1997 Busan	7	1	2	2	5
2001 Osaka	6	3	1	3	7
2005 Macau	7	2	2	9	13
2009 Hong Kong	4	26	31	53	110
2013 Tianjin	5	10	16	30	56
Total	5	43	54	105	202

== See also ==
- Hong Kong at the Olympics
- Hong Kong at the Commonwealth Games
- Hong Kong bid for the 2006 Asian Games
