= South Korea at the Asian Games =

- IOC code: KOR
- NOC: Korean Olympic Committee
- Website: https://www.sports.or.kr/eng/index.do
- Medals Ranked 3rd: Gold 826 Silver 765 Bronze 984 Total 2,575

Summer appearances
- 1954; 1958; 1962; 1966; 1970; 1974; 1978; 1982; 1986; 1990; 1994; 1998; 2002; 2006; 2010; 2014; 2018; 2022; 2026

Winter appearances
- 1986; 1990; 1996; 1999; 2003; 2007; 2011; 2017; 2025; 2029

The Republic of Korea has competed at every celebration of the Asian Games except the 1951 Asian Games, including hosting the Summer Games in 1986, 2002, and 2014 and the Winter Games in 1999.

South Korean athletes have won a total of 2,235 medals at the Asian Games and have won a total of 249 medals at the Asian Winter Games, with short-track speed skating and speed skating as the main medal-producing sports. However, South Korea never finished at the top of the medal table of an Asian Games (the closest was in 1986 edition).

Male athletes receive an exemption from mandatory active-duty military service by winning a gold medal at the Asian Games or any medal at the Olympic Games. They instead complete basic military training and a short period of community service, a policy designed to reward achievements that raise national prestige. Introduced in 1973 by the dictator Park Chung Hee, the policy has faced increasing domestic debate regarding civic equity and whether athletic achievements merit exemption from national duty. Following controversial comments made by football players after winning the gold medal at the 2026 Asian Games, the ministry of culture, sports and tourism announced that the government will review the military service exemption for gold-medal winning athletes after public backlash.

== Asian Games ==
*Red border color indicates tournament was held on home soil.

=== Medals by Games ===
Games	Rank	Gold	Silver	Bronze	Total	Athletes
(Philippines) 1954 Manila	3	8	6	5	19	57
(Japan) 1958 Tokyo	3	8	7	12	27	119
(Indonesia) 1962 Jakarta	6	4	9	10	23	137
(Thailand) 1966 Bangkok	2	12	18	21	51	181
(Thailand) 1970 Bangkok	2	18	13	23	54	131
(Iran) 1974 Tehran	4	16	26	15	57	177
(Thailand) 1978 Bangkok	3	18	20	31	69	203
(India) 1982 New Delhi	3	28	28	37	93	280
(South Korea) 1986 Seoul	2	93	55	76	224	494
(China) 1990 Beijing	2	54	54	73	181	552
(Japan) 1994 Hiroshima	3	63	56	64	183	558
(Thailand) 1998 Bangkok	2	65	46	53	164	537
(South Korea) 2002 Busan	2	96	80	84	260	770
(Qatar) 2006 Doha	2	58	52	83	193	656
(China) 2010 Guangzhou	2	76	65	91	232	806
(South Korea) 2014 Incheon	2	79	70	79	228	831
(Indonesia) 2018 Jakarta / Palembang	3	49	58	71	178	807
(China) 2022 Hangzhou	3	42	59	89	190	867
(Japan) 2026 Nagoya	3	39	43	68	150	787
Total	3	826	765	984	2,575	8,984

=== Medals by sport ===
Sport	Rank	Gold	Silver	Bronze	Total
Archery	1	42	25	16	83
Athletics	5	34	36	58	128
Badminton	3	16	17	33	66
Baseball	1	5	1	1	7
Basketball	2	11	12	7	30
Bodybuilding	2	3	0	4	7
Bowling	1	33	22	23	78
Boxing	1	59	25	30	114
Canoeing	5	5	12	16	33
Cue sports	8	1	4	4	9
Cycling	3	39	33	43	115
Dancesport	2	0	7	3	10
Diving	4	1	7	16	24
Dragon boat	5	0	0	1	1
Equestrian	2	16	14	7	37
Fencing	2	46	42	34	122
Football	1	5	3	6	14
Go	1	4	1	2	7
Golf	1	13	13	9	35
Gymnastics	2	20	19	36	75
Handball	1	13	1	3	17
Hockey	1	9	4	2	15
Judo	2	41	31	44	116
Ju-jitsu	3	2	4	8	14
Karate	19	0	0	9	9
Modern pentathlon	1	10	10	8	28
Roller sports	3	3	3	4	10
Rowing	3	1	14	21	36
Rugby union	1	4	1	1	6
Sailing	2	21	10	15	46
Sepaktakraw	5	1	7	9	17
Shooting	2	63	90	90	243
Soft tennis	1	23	13	14	50
Squash	6	0	0	3	3
Swimming	3	21	16	60	97
Synchronized swimming	3	0	3	4	7
Table tennis	3	10	28	46	84
Taekwondo	1	53	11	6	70
Tennis	2	16	20	15	51
Triathlon	4	0	1	1	2
Volleyball	3	5	17	7	29
Water polo	8	0	1	1	2
Weightlifting	3	31	26	29	86
Wrestling	3	52	28	52	132
Wushu	3	3	6	9	18
Total	3	699	608	763	2070

=== Medals by individual ===
Athlete	Sport	Years	Gender	Gold	Silver	Bronze	Total
Park Tae-hwan	Swimming	2006–2014	M	6	3	8	17
Suh Jung-kyun	Equestrian	1986–2006	M	6	2	0	8
Yang Chung-hoon	Archery	1986–1990	M	6	1	0	7
Nam Hyun-hee	Fencing	2002–2014	F	6	0	1	7
Park Byung-taek	Shooting	1990–2010	M	5	9	5	19
Lee Eun-chul	Shooting	1986–1998	M	5	6	0	11
Kim Jin-ho	Archery	1978–1986	F	5	4	0	9
You Young-dong	Soft tennis	1994–2006	M	5	3	2	10
Hwang Sun-ok	Bowling	2006–2002	F	5	2	0	7
Cho Ho-sung	Cycling	1994–2010	M	5	1	0	6
Choi Jun-sang	Equestrian	2002–2010	M	5	0	0	5
Jang Sun-jae	Cycling	2006–2010	M	5	0	0	5

== Asian Winter Games ==
*Red border color indicates tournament was held on home soil.

=== Medals by Games ===
Games	Rank	Gold	Silver	Bronze	Total
(Japan) 1986 Sapporo	3	1	5	12	18
(Japan) 1990 Sapporo	3	6	7	8	21
(China) 1996 Harbin	4	8	10	8	26
(South Korea) 1999 Gangwon	2	11	10	14	35
(Japan) 2003 Aomori	2	10	8	10	28
(China) 2007 Changchun	3	9	13	11	33
(Kazakhstan) 2011 Astana / Almaty	3	13	12	13	38
(Japan) 2017 Sapporo / Obihiro	2	16	18	16	50
(China) 2025 Harbin	2	16	15	14	45
(Saudi Arabia) 2029 Trojena	Future event				
Total	3	90	98	106	294

=== Medals by sport ===
Sport	Rank	Gold	Silver	Bronze	Total
Alpine skiing	2	8	11	16	35
Biathlon	4	0	1	6	7
Cross-country skiing	4	2	5	9	16
Curling	1	3	2	1	6
Figure skating	5	1	0	2	3
Ice hockey	4	0	1	4	5
Freestyle skiing	4	0	1	0	1
Short-track speed skating	1	34	35	27	96
Ski jumping	3	1	0	3	4
Ski orienteering	2	0	1	1	2
Snowboarding	3	2	3	3	8
Speed skating	2	23	23	21	67
Total	4	74	83	92	249

== East Asian Games ==
*Red border color indicates tournament was held on home soil.

=== Medals by Games ===
Games	Rank	Gold	Silver	Bronze	Total
1993 Shanghai	3	23	28	40	91
1997 Busan	3	45	38	51	134
2001 Osaka	3	34	46	32	112
2005 Macau	3	32	48	65	145
2009 Hong Kong	3	39	45	59	143
2013 Tianjin	3	36	51	74	161
Total	3	209	256	321	786

== Asian Indoor and Martial Arts Games ==
*Red border color indicates tournament was held on home soil.

=== Medals by Games ===
Games	Rank	Gold	Silver	Bronze	Total
Asian Indoor Games
2005 Bangkok	8	5	7	10	22
2007 Macau	4	10	14	13	37
2009 Hanoi	6	16	14	16	46
Asian Martial Arts Games
2009 Bangkok	3	10	6	3	19
Asian Indoor and Martial Arts Games
2013 Incheon	2	22	26	22	70
2017 Ashgabat	7	15	11	15	41
Total	5	78	78	79	235

== Asian Beach Games ==
=== Medals by Games ===
Games	Rank	Gold	Silver	Bronze	Total
2008 Bali	4	4	7	10	21
2010 Muscat	8	2	3	0	5
2012 Haiyang	3	6	7	10	23
2014 Phuket	4	9	14	14	37
2016 Danang	23	1	4	11	16
2026 Sanya	Future event				
Total	5	22	35	45	102

== Asian Youth Games ==
=== Medals by Games ===
Games	Rank	Gold	Silver	Bronze	Total
2009 Singapore	2	20	17	17	54
2013 Nanjing	2	25	13	14	52
2017 Hambantota	Cancelled				
2021 Shantou	Future event				
Total	2	45	30	31	106

== Asian Para Games ==
*Red border color indicates tournament was held on home soil.

=== Medals by Games ===
Games	Rank	Gold	Silver	Bronze	Total
2010 Guangzhou	3	27	43	33	103
2014 Incheon	2	72	62	77	211
2018 Jakarta	2	53	45	46	144
2022 Hangzhou	4	30	33	40	103
2026 Aichi-Nagoya	5	29	38	33	100
Total	2	211	221	230	662

Medals per sport

Sport Gold Silver Bronze Total

Archery 4 10 8 22

Athletics 7 10 13 30

Badminton 9 8 9 26

Blind Football 0 0 1 1

Boccia 4 8 6 18

Cycling Road 18 11 12 41

Goalball 0 1 1 2

Judo 10 5 8 23

Lawn Bowls 14 8 4 26

Para Dance Sport 5 0 1 6

Para Football 7-a-side 0 0 1 1

Para Shooting 16 10 19 45

Para Tenpin Bowling 28 14 7 49

Powerlifting 2 2 5 9

Rowing 2 1 1 4

Swimming 14 22 19 55

Table Tennis 16 30 19 65

Wheelchair Basketball 1 0 2 3

Wheelchair Fencing 0 3 16 19

Wheelchair Rugby 0 1 0 1

Wheelchair Tennis 2 4 4 10

Total 152 148 156 456

Medals per year

Year Gold Silver Bronze Total

2018 54 44 46 144

2014 71 61 77 209

2010 27 43 33 103

Total 152 148 156 456

== Asian Youth Para Games ==
=== Medals by Games ===
Games	Rank	Gold	Silver	Bronze	Total
2009 Tokyo	7	13	9	7	29
2013 Kuala Lumpur	10	11	7	6	24
2017 Dubai	8	14	9	10	33
2021 Manama	4	14	11	22	47
2025 Dubai	8	17	14	14	45
Total	6	69	50	59	178

== See also ==
- South Korea at the Olympics
