= Bahrain at the Asian Games =

Sporting event delegation

- IOC code: BRN
- NOC: Bahrain Olympic Committee
- Medals Ranked 14th: Gold 49 Silver 27 Bronze 28 Total 104

Summer appearances
- 1974; 1978; 1982; 1986; 1990; 1994; 1998; 2002; 2006; 2010; 2014; 2018; 2022; 2026

Winter appearances
- 2011; 2017; 2025; 2029

Bahrain first competed at the Asian Games in 1974. The country won its first Asian Games medal, a bronze in the men's 400 m hurdles through Ahmed Hamada, at the 1982 Asian Games in New Delhi. Hamada won Bahrain's first gold medal in the same event at the 1986 Asian Games in Seoul, setting a personal best of 49.31 seconds.

Bahrain made its debut at the Asian Winter Games in 2011 but withdrew from the 2017 edition held in Sapporo after the government declined to fund the team. Bahrain has won 104 medals at the games, including 49 gold medals, 27 silver medals and 28 bronze medals.

Several Bahrain athletes have been sanctioned for doping violations at the Asian Games. Kemi Adekoya was banned for four years after testing positive for stanozolol and was stripped of two gold medals from the 2018 Asian Games. Hassan Chani was banned for four years in 2020 for biological passport abnormalities and was stripped of his men's 10,000 m gold from the same Games. At the 2018 Asian Games, all ten of Bahrain's individual athletics gold medals were won by athletes born in Africa, drawing attention to the country's naturalization practices.

== Medal tables ==
=== Medals by Asian Games ===
Peach colour indicates best performance

Games	Rank	Gold	Silver	Bronze	Total
1974 Tehran	20	0	0	0	0
1978 Bangkok	20	0	0	0	0
1982 New Delhi	19	0	0	1	1
1986 Seoul	12	1	0	1	2
1990 Beijing	26	0	0	0	0
1994 Hiroshima	33	0	0	0	0
1998 Bangkok	31	0	0	0	0
2002 Busan	19	3	2	2	7
2006 Doha	14	7	9	4	20
2010 Guangzhou	14	5	0	4	9
2014 Incheon	12	9	6	4	19
2018 Jakarta / Palembang	11	12	7	7	26
2022 Hangzhou	9	12	3	5	20
2026 Nagoya	10	11	5	6	22
2030 Doha	Future event				
2034 Riyadh	Future event				
Total	14	49	32	34	104

=== Medals by Asian Para Games ===
Games	Rank	Gold	Silver	Bronze	Total
2010 Guangzhou	19	1	2	0	3
2014 Incheon	28	0	1	2	3
2018 Jakarta	28	0	2	1	3
2022 Hangzhou	28	0	0	1	1
Total	29	1	5	4	10
