= 2017 Asian Youth Para Games =

Youth multi-sport event

III Asian Youth Para Games
- Host city: Dubai, United Arab Emirates
- Nations: 30
- Athletes: 800
- Events: 7 sports
- Opening: 10 December
- Closing: 14 December
- Opened by: Mohammed bin Rashid Al Maktoum
- Main venue: DSC Indoor Arena
- Website: AYPGDubai2017

The 2017 Asian Youth Para Games (Arabic: الألعاب الأسيوية البارالمبية للشباب 2017), also known as the 3rd Asian Youth Para Games, was a third edition of multi-sport event for Asian athletes with disability. This event was held in Dubai, United Arab Emirates.

== Venues ==
- Dubai Club for People of Determination - Athletics, Goalball, Powerlifting, Table tennis
- Al Wasl Club - Badminton
- Shabab Al Ahli Club - Boccia
- Hamdan Sports Complex - Swimming

== The Games ==
=== Participating nations ===
- Bahrain (7)
- China (41)
- Hong Kong (35)
- Indonesia (25)
- India (41)
- Iran (116) (Top Nation)
- Iraq (26)
- Japan (89)
- Kazakhstan (23)
- Kyrgyzstan (1)
- South Korea (40)
- Saudi Arabia (33)
- Kuwait (6)
- Macau (3)
- Malaysia (12)
- Mongolia (5)
- Nepal (2)
- Oman (4)
- Pakistan (2)
- Philippines (17)
- Palestine (2)
- Singapore (29)
- Sri Lanka (8)
- Thailand (80)
- Tajikistan (3)
- Turkmenistan (6)
- United Arab Emirates (31) (host)
- Uzbekistan (10)
- Vietnam (15)
- Yemen (3)

=== Sports ===
Archery, Bowling, and Chess were canceled due to shortage of athletes.

- Athletics
- Badminton
- Boccia
- Goalball
- Powerlifting
- Swimming
- Table tennis

=== Medal table ===
Rank	Nation	Gold	Silver	Bronze	Total
1	Japan (JPN)	43	29	26	98
2	Iran (IRI)	39	44	35	118
3	China (CHN)	27	9	5	41
4	Uzbekistan (UZB)	20	6	2	28
5	Thailand (THA)	19	15	19	53
6	India (IND)	17	14	13	44
7	Indonesia (INA)	16	7	5	28
8	South Korea (KOR)	14	9	10	33
9	Saudi Arabia (KSA)	10	3	3	16
10	United Arab Emirates (UAE)*	9	5	3	17
11	Hong Kong (HKG)	8	13	4	25
12	Iraq (IRQ)	6	6	5	17
13	Kazakhstan (KAZ)	6	5	2	13
14	Singapore (SGP)	5	6	7	18
15	Malaysia (MAS)	5	1	2	8
16	Vietnam (VIE)	3	5	2	10
17	Kuwait (KUW)	2	1	3	6
18	Brunei (BRN)	1	5	2	8
19	Oman (OMA)	1	3	1	5
20	Macau (MAC)	0	1	1	2
21	Philippines (PHI)	0	0	1	1
22	Kyrgyzstan (KGZ)	0	0	0	0
22	Mongolia (MGL)	0	0	0	0
22	Nepal (NEP)	0	0	0	0
22	Pakistan (PAK)	0	0	0	0
22	Palestine (PLE)	0	0	0	0
22	Sri Lanka (SRI)	0	0	0	0
22	Tajikistan (TJK)	0	0	0	0
22	Turkmenistan (TKM)	0	0	0	0
22	Yemen (YEM)	0	0	0	0
Totals (30 entries)		251	187	151	589

== See also ==
- Paralympics
- Asian Youth Para Games
- 2009 Asian Youth Para Games
- 2013 Asian Youth Para Games

Preceded by Kuala Lumpur	Asian Youth Para Games; Dubai; III Asian Youth Para Games (2017)	Succeeded by Manama
