= 2013 Asian Youth Para Games =

Youth multi-sport event

II Asian Youth Para Games
- Host city: Kuala Lumpur, Malaysia
- Motto: Passion Grows, Dreams Fulfilled, Friendships Strengthened
- Nations: 29
- Athletes: 1200
- Sport: 14
- Opening: October 26
- Closing: October 30
- Opened by: Khairy Jamaluddin; Minister of Youth and Sports
- Main venue: Putra Stadium
- Website: 2013 Asian Youth Para Games

The 2013 Asian Youth Para Games (Malay: Sukan Para Remaja Asia 2013), officially known as the 2nd Asian Youth Para Games, was an Asian youth disabled multi-sport event held in Kuala Lumpur, Malaysia from 26 to 30 October 2013. Around 1200 athletes from 29 participating nations participated at the games which featured 14 sports.

This was the first time Malaysia hosted the games. Malaysia is the second nation to host the Asian Youth Para Games after Japan. The games was opened and closed by Khairy Jamaluddin at the Putra Stadium.

The final medal tally was led by Japan, followed by China, Iran, and host Malaysia.

== Organisation ==
=== Development and preparation ===
The Malaysia Asian Youth Para Games Organising Committee (MAYPGOC) was formed to oversee the staging of the games.

=== Venues ===
The 2nd Asian Youth Para Games had 15 venues for the games, 13 in Kuala Lumpur and 2 in Selangor.

State	Competition Venue	Sports
Kuala Lumpur	National Sports Complex, Malaysia
Kuala Lumpur	Bukit Jalil National Stadium	Athletics
Kuala Lumpur	Commonwealth Hall, NSC	Chess
Kuala Lumpur	National Aquatics Centre	Swimming
Kuala Lumpur	Sri Putra Hall	Judo
Kuala Lumpur	Putra Stadium	Opening and closing ceremony
Kuala Lumpur	Others
Kuala Lumpur	Titiwangsa Stadium	Powerlifting
Kuala Lumpur	Bukit Kiara Sports Complex	Badminton
Kuala Lumpur	Kampung Pandan Sports Complex	Volleyball Sitting
Kuala Lumpur	National Tennis Centre, Jalan Duta	Wheelchair Tennis
Kuala Lumpur	Kuala Lumpur Badminton Stadium, Cheras	Boccia
Kuala Lumpur	OCM Indoor Sports Arena	Table Tennis
Kuala Lumpur	National Archery Centre, Keramat	Archery
Kuala Lumpur	Megalanes Bowl, Endah Parade	Tenpin Bowling
Selangor	Bangi Rehabilitation and Industrial Training Centre	Goalball
Selangor	Panasonic National Sports Complex, Shah Alam	Wheelchair Basketball

== Marketing ==
=== Logo ===
The 2013 Asian Youth Para Games logo is a bold, freestyle font image which represents the courageous and outgoing nature of youth. The red letters on the logo are outlined in blue with red represents the ambitious nature of these youthful athletes and their determination to succeed while the blue represents the spirit of togetherness and sportsmanship. The white dot of the letter ‘i’ represents the target or goal to be achieved by the athletes, officials and volunteers. The word ‘Malaysia’ represents the host nation of the games, Malaysia itself, while the Asian Paralympic Committee logo above the logo represents both the Asian Paralympic Committee and the Asian Youth Para Games.

=== Mascot ===
The mascot of the 2013 Asian Youth Para Games is a mousedeer named, "Ujang". It is said that the mousedeer is a native animal in Malaysia locally known as pelanduk or kancil which is shy, but very agile and quick thinking. It is a favourite character in local folktales commonly known as "Sang Kancil", noted for its intelligence, wit, cunning feints and quick reaction to escape from all kinds of danger, especially from its enemies. The adoption of mousedeer as the games' mascot is to represent the courage of the Paralympic athletes in overcoming challenges and the odds. The name of the mascot, Ujang is a common nickname for local Malay youths.

== The games ==
=== Participating nations ===
- Bahrain
- Brunei
- China
- Hong Kong
- Indonesia
- Iran
- Iraq
- Jordan
- Japan
- Kazakhstan
- South Korea
- Saudi Arabia
- Malaysia
- Macau
- Mongolia
- Myanmar
- Pakistan
- Philippines
- North Korea
- Singapore
- Sri Lanka
- Syria
- Qatar (x)
- Chinese Taipei
- Tajikistan (x)
- Thailand
- United Arab Emirates
- Uzbekistan
- Vietnam

=== Sports ===
- Archery
- Athletics
- Badminton
- Boccia
- Chess
- Goalball
- Judo
- Powerlifting
- Swimming
- Table tennis
- Bowling
- Sitting volleyball
- Wheelchair tennis
- Wheelchair basketball

=== Medal table ===
* Host nation (Malaysia)

Rank	Nation	Gold	Silver	Bronze	Total
1	Japan (JPN)	39	20	25	84
2	Iran (IRI)	27	13	19	59
3	China (CHN)	25	8	5	38
4	Malaysia (MAS)*	19	22	18	59
5	Thailand (THA)	16	11	9	36
6	Vietnam (VIE)	16	4	3	23
7	Iraq (IRQ)	15	14	7	36
8	Hong Kong (HKG)	15	10	7	32
9	Kazakhstan (KAZ)	12	15	12	39
10	South Korea (KOR)	11	7	6	24
11	Indonesia (INA)	8	5	5	18
12	Jordan (JOR)	8	4	3	15
13	Uzbekistan (UZB)	6	4	2	12
14	Chinese Taipei (TPE)	4	5	2	11
15	United Arab Emirates (UAE)	4	3	0	7
16	Myanmar (MYA)	3	4	4	11
17	Sri Lanka (SRI)	3	2	0	5
18	Philippines (PHI)	1	1	5	7
19	Saudi Arabia (KSA)	1	1	3	5
20	Syria (SYR)	1	1	1	3
21	Brunei (BRU)	1	0	0	1
22	North Korea (PRK)	0	3	1	4
23	Singapore (SIN)	0	3	0	3
24	Bahrain (BRN)	0	2	1	3
25	Pakistan (PAK)	0	1	1	2
26	Mongolia (MGL)	0	1	0	1
27	Macau (MAC)	0	0	1	1
Totals (27 entries)		235	164	140	539

Preceded by Tokyo	Asian Youth Para Games; Kuala Lumpur; II Asian Youth Para Games (2013)	Succeeded by Dubai
