= 2009 Asian Youth Para Games =

Youth multi-sport event

I Asian Youth Para Games
- Host city: Tokyo, Japan
- Motto: Your Dream, Our Legacy
- Nations: 29 (24 APC members and 5 Guest nations)
- Athletes: 466
- Sports: 6 (5 main sports and 1 demonstration sport)
- Opening: September 10
- Closing: September 13
- Opened by: Akihito
- Main venue: Tokyo Metropolitan Gymnasium

The 2009 Asian Youth Para Games (Japanese: 2009年アジアユースパラゲームズ, romanized: Nisenkyū-Nen Ajiayūsuparagēmuzu), officially known as the 1st Asian Youth Para Games, was an Asian youth disabled multi-sport event held in Tokyo, Japan from 10 to 13 September 2009. Around 466 athletes from 29 participating nations participated at the games which featured 6 sports consisted of 5 main sports and 1 demonstration sport.

This was the first time Japan hosted the games. Japan is the first nation to host the Asian Youth Para Games. The games was opened and closed by Akihito at the Tokyo Metropolitan Gymnasium.

The final medal tally was led by host Japan, followed by Iran and China.

== Organisation ==
=== Development and preparation ===
The Tokyo 2009 Asian Youth Para Games Organising Committee (TAYPOC) was formed to oversee the staging of the games.

=== Venues ===
City	Competition Venue	Sports
Tokyo
Tokyo	Tokyo Metropolitan Gymnasium	Opening ceremony and Wheelchair tennis
Tokyo	Olympic Stadium	Athletics
Tokyo	Tokyo Tatsumi International Swimming Center	Swimming
Tokyo	Yoyogi National Gymnasium	Table tennis and Goalball
Tokyo	National Olympics Memorial Youth Center	Boccia

== The games ==
=== Participating nations ===
- Cambodia (x)
- China
- Hong Kong
- Iran
- Iraq
- Jordan
- Japan
- Kazakhstan
- South Korea
- Kuwait
- Laos (x)
- Lebanon
- Malaysia
- Mongolia (x)
- Nepal (x)
- Pakistan
- Palestine
- Singapore
- Sri Lanka
- Chinese Taipei
- Tajikistan (x)
- Thailand
- Timor-Leste (x)
- Uzbekistan

Guest participating nations
Play only demonstration sport: Wheelchair tennis

- Australia
- South Africa
- Spain
- Germany
- New Zealand

=== Sports ===
Main sport

- Athletics
- Badminton
- Boccia
- Swimming
- Table tennis

Demonstration sport
Athletes of this sport are not entitled to win medals, specially for guest participating nations.

- Wheelchair tennis

=== Medal table ===
* Host nation (Japan)

2009 Asian Youth Para Games medal table
Rank	NPC	Gold	Silver	Bronze	Total
1	Japan (JPN)*	65	26	22	113
2	Iran (IRI)	26	24	18	68
3	China (CHN)	23	5	0	28
4	Iraq (IRQ)	17	9	4	30
5	Hong Kong (HKG)	17	5	7	29
6	Thailand (THA)	13	16	3	32
7	South Korea (KOR)	13	9	7	29
8	Kazakhstan (KAZ)	7	12	4	23
9	Chinese Taipei (TPE)	7	3	1	11
10	Jordan (JOR)	7	1	3	11
11	Kuwait (KUW)	5	10	0	15
12	Malaysia (MAS)	5	7	10	22
13	Uzbekistan (UZB)	4	3	1	8
14	Pakistan (PAK)	4	1	5	10
15	Singapore (SIN)	4	1	0	5
16	Palestine (PLE)	2	3	0	5
17	Lebanon (LIB)	0	2	0	2
18	Sri Lanka (SRI)	0	1	0	1
Totals (18 entries)		219	138	85	442

== See also ==
- 2009 Asian Youth Games
- Tokyo bid for the 2016 Summer Olympics

Preceded by None	Asian Youth Para Games; Tokyo; I Asian Youth Para Games (2009)	Succeeded by Kuala Lumpur
