= Dancesport at the Asian Games =

- Governing bodies: WDSF (World) / DSA (Asia)
- Events: 2 (men: 1; women: 1)

Games
- 1951; 1954; 1958; 1962; 1966; 1970; 1974; 1978; 1982; 1986; 1990; 1994; 1998; 2002; 2006; 2010; 2014; 2018; 2022; 2026; Demonstration sport years indicated in italics
- Medalists

Dancesport is a competitive team sport which includes ballroom dancing. The sport became a part of the Asian Games (Asian Summer Games) as a medal sport in 2010 in Guangzhou, China. International governing body of Dancesport, World DanceSport Federation, was recognized by the International Olympic Committee in 1995, and subsequently in 1997 the Asian representative of the sport, Asian DanceSport Federation, was recognized by the Olympic Council of Asia. After the recognition of the Asian DanceSport Federation, the sport was demonstrated at the 1998 Asian Games in Bangkok, Thailand.

== Inclusion ==
World DanceSport Federation, the international governing body of dancesport, was recognized by the International Olympic Committee in September 1995. After two years, the Asian representative of the sport, Asian DanceSport Federation, gained recognition from the Olympic Council of Asia, and dancesport became a part of the Asian Games sports. It was subsequently featured at the 1998 Asian Games in Bangkok, Thailand, as a demonstration sport. Dancesport was included as one of the 42 medal sports in the 2010 Asian Games, held in Guangzhou, People's Republic of China.

== Exclusion ==
Olympic Council of Asia dropped six sports from the Asian Games program: roller sports, chess, cue sports, softball, dancesport and dragon boat. Out of these six, three—roller sports, dancesport and dragon boat—were included only once in the Games, at the Guangzhou 2010. Thus, the dancesport has not been scheduled to be in the program of the 2014 Asian Games, Incheon, South Korea.

== Events ==
Event	98	10	22	26	Years
Standard
Five dances	d	X			1
Quickstep		X			1
Slow foxtrot		X			1
Tango		X			1
Waltz		X			1
Latin
Five dances	d	X			1
Cha-cha-cha		X			1
Jive		X			1
Paso doble		X			1
Samba		X			1
Breaking
B-Boys			X	X	2
B-Girls			X	X	2
Total	0	10	2	2	14

== Medal table ==
Rank	Nation	Gold	Silver	Bronze	Total
1	China (CHN)	12	0	3	15
2	Japan (JPN)	2	5	5	12
3	South Korea (KOR)	0	9	3	12
4	Philippines (PHI)	0	0	2	2
5	Kazakhstan (KAZ)	0	0	1	1
Totals (5 entries)		14	14	14	42

== Participating nations ==
Nation	98	10	22	26	Years
China	8	12	4	4	4
Chinese Taipei	6	12	4	4	4
Hong Kong	4	2	4	1	4
Indonesia	4				1
Japan		12	4	4	3
Kazakhstan		12	3	4	3
Kyrgyzstan		4			1
Lebanon		4			1
Macau		8			1
Malaysia	6				1
Mongolia			3	3	2
Nepal			1		1
Philippines	8	12	3		3
Singapore	8				1
South Korea		12	4	4	3
Tajikistan			4	4	2
Thailand	8	10	4	4	4
Uzbekistan			3		1
Vietnam		8	4	4	3
Number of nations	8	12	13	10	
Number of athletes	52	108	45	36	
