= Dancesport at the 2010 Asian Games =

- Venue: Zengcheng Gymnasium
- Dates: 13–14 November 2010
- Competitors: 108 from 12 nations

Dancesport at the 2010 Asian Games was held in Zengcheng Gymnasium, Guangzhou, China from 13 November to 14 November 2010.

== Schedule ==
Q	Quarterfinal	S	Semifinal	F	Final

Event↓/Date →	13th Sat			14th Sun		
Standard
Five dances				S		F
Quickstep	Q	S	F			
Slow foxtrot	Q	S	F			
Tango	Q	S	F			
Waltz	Q	S	F			
Latin
Five dances	Q	S	F			
Cha-cha-cha				Q	S	F
Jive				Q	S	F
Paso doble				Q	S	F
Samba				Q	S	F

== Medalists ==
=== Standard ===
Event	Gold	Silver	Bronze
Five dances	China; Yang Chao; Tan Yiling	South Korea; Jo Sang-hyo; Lee Se-hee	Kazakhstan; Timur Namazbayev; Amanda Batkalova
Quickstep	China; Yang Chao; Tan Yiling	Japan; Masayuki Ishihara; Ayami Kubo	South Korea; Lee Sang-min; Kim Hye-in
Slow foxtrot	China; Wu Zhian; Lei Ying	South Korea; Nam Sang-wung; Song Yi-na	Japan; Tsuyoshi Nukina; Mariko Shibahara
Tango	China; Shen Hong; Liang Yujie	South Korea; Nam Sang-wung; Song Yi-na	Japan; Minato Kojima; Megumi Morita
Waltz	China; Shen Hong; Liang Yujie	Japan; Masayuki Ishihara; Ayami Kubo	South Korea; Jo Sang-hyo; Lee Se-hee

=== Latin ===
Event	Gold	Silver	Bronze
Five dances	China; Shi Lei; Zhang Baiyu	Japan; Yumiya Kubota; Rara Kubota	South Korea; Kim Dae-dong; Yoo Hae-sook
Cha-cha-cha	China; Shi Lei; Zhang Baiyu	South Korea; Kim Do-hyeon; Park Su-myo	Philippines; Ronnie Vergara; Charlea Lagaras
Jive	China; Fan Wenbo; Chen Shiyao	South Korea; Kim Do-hyeon; Park Su-myo	Japan; Yumiya Kubota; Rara Kubota
Paso doble	China; Wang Wei; Chen Jin	South Korea; Jang Se-jin; Lee Hae-in	Philippines; Ronnie Vergara; Charlea Lagaras
Samba	China; Wang Wei; Chen Jin	South Korea; Jang Se-jin; Lee Hae-in	Japan; Tsuneki Masatani; Megumi Saito

== Medal table ==
Rank	Nation	Gold	Silver	Bronze	Total
1	China (CHN)	10	0	0	10
2	South Korea (KOR)	0	7	3	10
3	Japan (JPN)	0	3	4	7
4	Philippines (PHI)	0	0	2	2
5	Kazakhstan (KAZ)	0	0	1	1
Totals (5 entries)		10	10	10	30

== Participating nations ==
A total of 108 athletes from 12 nations competed in dancesport at the 2010 Asian Games:

- China (12)
- Chinese Taipei (12)
- Hong Kong (2)
- Japan (12)
- Kazakhstan (12)
- Kyrgyzstan (4)
- Lebanon (4)
- Macau (8)
- Philippines (12)
- South Korea (12)
- Thailand (10)
- Vietnam (8)
