= Macau at the Asian Games =

- IOC code: MAC
- NOC: Macau Sports and Olympic Committee
- Medals Ranked 35th: Gold 4 Silver 18 Bronze 23 Total 45

Summer appearances
- 1990; 1994; 1998; 2002; 2006; 2010; 2014; 2018; 2022; 2026

Winter appearances
- 2007; 2011; 2017; 2025; 2029

Macau first competed at the Asian Games in 1990, after the Macau Olympic Committee joined the Olympic Council of Asia in 1989. They have claimed 3 gold, 14 silver and 22 bronze medals.

== Medal tables ==
=== Gold Medalists ===
Medal	Name	Games	Sport	Event
Gold	Jia Rui	2010 Guangzhou	Wushu	Men's daoshu / gunshu
Gold	Huang Junhua	2018 Jakarta-Palembang	Wushu	Men's nanquan
Gold	Li Yi	2022 Hangzhou	Wushu	Women's changquan
