= List of Asian Games medalists in dancesport =

This is the complete list of medalists in Dancesport at the Asian Games from 2010 to 2026.

== Standard dance ==
=== Five dances ===
| Games | Gold | Silver | Bronze |
|---|---|---|---|
| 2010 Guangzhou | Yang Chao and Tan Yiling (CHN) | Jo Sang-hyo and Lee Se-hee (KOR) | Timur Namazbayev and Amanda Batkalova (KAZ) |

=== Quickstep ===
| Games | Gold | Silver | Bronze |
|---|---|---|---|
| 2010 Guangzhou | Yang Chao and Tan Yiling (CHN) | Masayuki Ishihara and Ayami Kubo (JPN) | Lee Sang-min and Kim Hye-in (KOR) |

=== Slow foxtrot ===
| Games | Gold | Silver | Bronze |
|---|---|---|---|
| 2010 Guangzhou | Wu Zhian and Lei Ying (CHN) | Nam Sang-wung and Song Yi-na (KOR) | Tsuyoshi Nukina and Mariko Shibahara (JPN) |

=== Tango ===
| Games | Gold | Silver | Bronze |
|---|---|---|---|
| 2010 Guangzhou | Shen Hong and Liang Yujie (CHN) | Nam Sang-wung and Song Yi-na (KOR) | Minato Kojima and Megumi Morita (JPN) |

=== Waltz ===
| Games | Gold | Silver | Bronze |
|---|---|---|---|
| 2010 Guangzhou | Shen Hong and Liang Yujie (CHN) | Masayuki Ishihara and Ayami Kubo (JPN) | Jo Sang-hyo and Lee Se-hee (KOR) |

== Latin dance ==
=== Five dances ===
| Games | Gold | Silver | Bronze |
|---|---|---|---|
| 2010 Guangzhou | Shi Lei and Zhang Baiyu (CHN) | Yumiya Kubota and Rara Kubota (JPN) | Kim Dae-dong and Yoo Hae-sook (KOR) |

=== Cha-cha-cha ===
| Games | Gold | Silver | Bronze |
|---|---|---|---|
| 2010 Guangzhou | Shi Lei and Zhang Baiyu (CHN) | Kim Do-hyeon and Park Su-myo (KOR) | Ronnie Vergara and Charlea Lagaras (PHI) |

=== Jive ===
| Games | Gold | Silver | Bronze |
|---|---|---|---|
| 2010 Guangzhou | Fan Wenbo and Chen Shiyao (CHN) | Kim Do-hyeon and Park Su-myo (KOR) | Yumiya Kubota and Rara Kubota (JPN) |

=== Paso doble ===
| Games | Gold | Silver | Bronze |
|---|---|---|---|
| 2010 Guangzhou | Wang Wei and Chen Jin (CHN) | Jang Se-jin and Lee Hae-in (KOR) | Ronnie Vergara and Charlea Lagaras (PHI) |

=== Samba ===
| Games | Gold | Silver | Bronze |
|---|---|---|---|
| 2010 Guangzhou | Wang Wei and Chen Jin (CHN) | Jang Se-jin and Lee Hae-in (KOR) | Tsuneki Masatani and Megumi Saito (JPN) |

== Breaking ==
=== B-Boys ===
| Games | Gold | Silver | Bronze |
|---|---|---|---|
| 2022 Hangzhou | Shigeyuki Nakarai (JPN) | Kim Hong-yul (KOR) | Qi Xiangyu (CHN) |
| 2026 Aichi–Nagoya | Shigeyuki Nakarai (JPN) | Kim Hong-yul (KOR) | Wang Ruimiao (CHN) |

=== B-Girls ===
| Games | Gold | Silver | Bronze |
|---|---|---|---|
| 2022 Hangzhou | Liu Qingyi (CHN) | Ami Yuasa (JPN) | Ayumi Fukushima (JPN) |
| 2026 Aichi–Nagoya | Guo Pu (CHN) | Ayumi Fukushima (JPN) | Liu Qingyi (CHN) |
