= Lee Hae-in =

Lee Hae-in may refer to:

- Lee Hae-in (actress) (born 1986), South Korean actress
- Lee Hae-in (singer) (born 1994), South Korean singer and a member of I.B.I
- Lee Hae-in (figure skater) (born 2005), South Korean figure skater
- Claudia Lee Hae-in (born 1945), South Korean poet published by Waegwan Abbey
- Lee Hae-in, South Korean dancesport medalist at the 2010 Asian Games
