= China at the Asian Games =

- IOC code: CHN
- NOC: Chinese Olympic Committee
- Medals Ranked 1st: Gold 1,843 Silver 1,194 Bronze 874 Total 3,911

Summer appearances
- 1974; 1978; 1982; 1986; 1990; 1994; 1998; 2002; 2006; 2010; 2014; 2018; 2022; 2026

Winter appearances
- 1986; 1990; 1996; 1999; 2003; 2007; 2011; 2017; 2025; 2029

People's Republic of China first competed at the Asian Games in 1974. China has also participated at the Asian Winter Games since the first games held in 1986 in Sapporo. China also hosted the three Summer Games in 1990, 2010, and 2022 and the three Winter Games in 1996, 2007, and 2025.

During the 1974 Asian Games, China became the second nation in the history of Asian Games after Japan in 1958 to cross the 100 medal-mark in one edition.

China has led the gold medal count in each Asian Games since 1982.

In 1986, China, together with Japan and South Korea became the first three countries in the history of Asian Games to cross the total 200 medal-mark in one edition, having become the only three countries with three-digit medal tally as well in that year.

China has been the only team to win more than 200 total medals at each Asian Games since 1986.

In 1990, China achieved a significant milestone by being the first nation to surpass the threshold of 100 gold medals and 300 total medals in a single edition.

China also stands out among all Asian teams, being the only one to win more than 100 gold medals at each Asian Games since 1990.

In 2010, China became the first nation in the history of Asian Games to cross the 400 medal-mark in one edition.

At the 2022 Asian Games, China became the first nation to reach 200 gold medals in one edition.

As of 2026, over the course of 14 Asian Summer Games, China finished at the top of the medal table 12 times. China finished at the top of the medal table 4 times out of 10 editions of the Asian Winter Games.

== Asian Games ==
*Red border color indicates tournament was held on home soil.

=== Medals by Games ===
| Games | Athletes | Rank | Gold | Silver | Bronze | Total |
|---|---|---|---|---|---|---|
| (India) 1951 New Delhi | did not participate | | | | | |
| (Philippines) 1954 Manila | did not participate | | | | | |
| (Japan) 1958 Tokyo | did not participate | | | | | |
| (Indonesia) 1962 Jakarta | did not participate | | | | | |
| (Thailand) 1966 Bangkok | did not participate | | | | | |
| (Thailand) 1970 Bangkok | did not participate | | | | | |
| (Iran) 1974 Tehran | 269 | 3 | 33 | 46 | 27 | 106 |
| (Thailand) 1978 Bangkok | 408 | 2 | 51 | 54 | 46 | 151 |
| (India) 1982 New Delhi | 265 | 1 | 61 | 51 | 41 | 153 |
| (South Korea) 1986 Seoul | 388 | 1 | 94 | 82 | 46 | 222 |
| (China) 1990 Beijing | 775 | 1 | 183 | 107 | 51 | 341 |
| (Japan) 1994 Hiroshima | 570 | 1 | 126 | 83 | 57 | 266 |
| (Thailand) 1998 Bangkok | 828 | 1 | 129 | 78 | 66 | 273 |
| (South Korea) 2002 Busan | 688 | 1 | 150 | 84 | 73 | 307 |
| (Qatar) 2006 Doha | 647 | 1 | 165 | 88 | 63 | 316 |
| (China) 2010 Guangzhou | 960 | 1 | 199 | 119 | 97 | 415 |
| (South Korea) 2014 Incheon | 894 | 1 | 151 | 109 | 85 | 345 |
| (Indonesia) 2018 Jakarta & Palembang | 845 | 1 | 132 | 93 | 65 | 289 |
| (China) 2022 Hangzhou | 886 | 1 | 201 | 111 | 71 | 383 |
| (Japan) 2026 Nagoya | 815 | 1 | 169 | 89 | 83 | 341 |
| Total | 9,238 | 1 | 1,843 | 1,194 | 874 | 3,911 |

=== Medals by sport ===
| Sport | Rank | Gold | Silver | Bronze | Total |
|---|---|---|---|---|---|
| Archery | 5 | 5 | 13 | 15 | 33 |
| Artistic swimming | 1 | 14 | 3 | 3 | 20 |
| Athletics | 1 | 199 | 179 | 123 | 501 |
| Badminton | 1 | 43 | 29 | 35 | 107 |
| Beach volleyball | 1 | 9 | 6 | 5 | 20 |
| Basketball | 1 | 18 | 6 | 5 | 29 |
| Board games | 1 | 8 | 8 | 5 | 21 |
| Bodybuilding | 7 | 1 | 0 | 0 | 1 |
| Bowling | 14 | 0 | 1 | 4 | 5 |
| Boxing | 5 | 16 | 14 | 16 | 46 |
| Canoeing | 1 | 56 | 24 | 18 | 98 |
| Cue sports | 2 | 8 | 4 | 4 | 16 |
| Cycling | 2 | 45 | 36 | 36 | 117 |
| Dancesport | 1 | 10 | 0 | 0 | 10 |
| Dragon boat | 1 | 10 | 3 | 2 | 15 |
| Diving | 1 | 80 | 55 | 3 | 138 |
| Equestrian | 4 | 4 | 4 | 4 | 12 |
| Esports | 1 | 7 | 1 | 1 | 9 |
| Fencing | 2 | 49 | 46 | 37 | 132 |
| Field hockey | 4 | 4 | 3 | 3 | 10 |
| Football | 4 | 3 | 3 | 3 | 9 |
| Go | 2 | 1 | 5 | 0 | 6 |
| Golf | 8 | 0 | 5 | 5 | 10 |
| Gymnastics | 1 | 159 | 96 | 50 | 305 |
| Handball | 2 | 2 | 3 | 4 | 9 |
| Judo | 3 | 21 | 17 | 39 | 77 |
| Karate | 9 | 3 | 4 | 3 | 10 |
| Kurash | 3 | 2 | 0 | 0 | 2 |
| Modern pentathlon | 2 | 9 | 7 | 6 | 22 |
| Roller sports | 4 | 2 | 6 | 5 | 13 |
| Rowing | 1 | 103 | 6 | 2 | 111 |
| Rugby | 3 | 2 | 2 | 1 | 5 |
| Sailing | 1 | 36 | 21 | 12 | 69 |
| Sepak takraw | 7 | 0 | 3 | 10 | 13 |
| Shooting | 1 | 221 | 134 | 84 | 439 |
| Soft tennis | 4 | 1 | 3 | 13 | 17 |
| Softball | 2 | 3 | 3 | 3 | 9 |
| Sport climbing | 3 | 2 | 4 | 5 | 11 |
| Swimming | 2 | 184 | 167 | 96 | 447 |
| Table tennis | 1 | 72 | 39 | 27 | 138 |
| Taekwondo | 2 | 15 | 13 | 22 | 50 |
| Tennis | 2 | 15 | 19 | 20 | 54 |
| Triathlon | 2 | 1 | 1 | 4 | 6 |
| Volleyball | 2 | 11 | 6 | 3 | 20 |
| Water polo | 1 | 8 | 3 | 3 | 14 |
| Weightlifting | 1 | 81 | 35 | 13 | 129 |
| Wrestling | 8 | 9 | 23 | 22 | 54 |
| Wushu | 1 | 74 | 10 | 4 | 88 |
| Total | 1 | 1590 | 1053 | 749 | 3392 |

=== Medals by individual ===
| Athlete | Sport | Years | Gender | Gold | Silver | Bronze | Total |
|---|---|---|---|---|---|---|---|
| Wang Yifu | Shooting | 1986–2002 | M | 14 | 8 | 3 | 25 |
| Xu Jiayu | Swimming | 2014–2022 | M | 11 | 2 | 1 | 14 |
| Sun Yang | Swimming | 2010–2018 | M | 9 | 5 | 0 | 14 |
| Zhang Yufei | Swimming | 2014–2022 | F | 9 | 1 | 0 | 10 |
| Xu Haifeng | Shooting | 1986–1994 | M | 9 | 0 | 0 | 9 |
| Li Ning | Gymnastics | 1982–1986 | M | 8 | 3 | 0 | 11 |
| Xu Yanwei | Swimming | 2002–2006 | F | 8 | 3 | 0 | 11 |
| Yang Wei | Gymnastics | 1998–2006 | M | 8 | 2 | 1 | 11 |
| Tan Zongliang | Shooting | 1998–2010 | M | 7 | 5 | 0 | 12 |
| Tang Yi | Swimming | 2006–2010 | F | 7 | 3 | 2 | 12 |
| Tao Luna | Shooting | 1998–2006 | F | 7 | 2 | 0 | 9 |
| Li Duihong | Shooting | 1990–2002 | F | 7 | 1 | 1 | 9 |
| Zhang Li | Table tennis | 1974–1978 | F | 7 | 0 | 0 | 7 |
| Li Bingjie | Swimming | 2018–2022 | F | 6 | 4 | 0 | 10 |
| Wang Nan | Table tennis | 2002–2006 | F | 6 | 2 | 4 | 12 |
| Shen Jianqiang | Swimming | 1986–1990 | M | 6 | 2 | 1 | 9 |
| Chen Cuiting | Gymnastics | 1986–1990 | F | 6 | 2 | 0 | 8 |
| Chen Ying | Shooting | 2002–2014 | F | 6 | 2 | 0 | 8 |
| Qi Hui | Swimming | 1998–2006 | F | 6 | 2 | 0 | 8 |
| Qin Haiyang | Swimming | 2018–2022 | M | 6 | 1 | 2 | 9 |
| Ye Shiwen | Swimming | 2010–2022 | F | 6 | 1 | 0 | 7 |
| Teng Haibin | Gymnastics | 2002–2010 | M | 6 | 0 | 1 | 7 |
| Ma Long | Table tennis | 2006–2022 | M | 6 | 0 | 1 | 7 |
| Zhang Nan | Gymnastics | 2002–2006 | F | 6 | 0 | 0 | 6 |
| Wang Chuqin | Table tennis | 2018–2022 | M | 6 | 0 | 0 | 6 |
| Zhang Qiuping | Shooting | 1986–1994 | F | 5 | 6 | 2 | 13 |
| Tsai Huantsang | Gymnastics | 1974–1978 | M | 5 | 4 | 0 | 9 |
| Wang Shun | Swimming | 2014–2022 | M | 5 | 3 | 3 | 11 |
| Deng Yaping | Table tennis | 1990–1994 | F | 5 | 3 | 0 | 8 |
| Fan Zhendong | Table tennis | 2014–2022 | M | 5 | 3 | 0 | 8 |
| Liang Geliang | Table tennis | 1974–1978 | M | 5 | 2 | 1 | 8 |
| Yang Yu | Swimming | 2002–2006 | F | 5 | 2 | 0 | 7 |
| Ding Junhui | Cue sports | 2002–2010 | M | 5 | 2 | 0 | 7 |
| Li Xiaoshuang | Gymnastics | 1990–1994 | M | 5 | 1 | 3 | 9 |
| Wang Chengyi | Shooting | 2006–2010 | F | 5 | 1 | 2 | 8 |
| Huang Xu | Gymnastics | 1998–2002 | M | 5 | 1 | 1 | 7 |
| Li Jing | Gymnastics | 1990–1994 | M | 5 | 1 | 1 | 7 |
| Li Xiaopeng | Gymnastics | 1998–2002 | M | 5 | 1 | 1 | 7 |
| Wang Runxi | Shooting | 1990–1994 | M | 5 | 1 | 1 | 7 |
| Zhao Jing | Swimming | 2006–2010 | F | 5 | 1 | 1 | 7 |
| Guo Yue | Table tennis | 2006–2010 | F | 5 | 1 | 0 | 6 |
| Lin Li | Swimming | 1990–1994 | F | 5 | 1 | 0 | 6 |
| Shan Ying | Swimming | 1994–1998 | F | 5 | 1 | 0 | 6 |
| Wang Lina | Shooting | 1990–1994 | F | 5 | 1 | 0 | 6 |
| Yan Ming | Swimming | 1986–1990 | F | 5 | 1 | 0 | 6 |
| Kong Linghui | Table tennis | 1994–2002 | M | 5 | 0 | 3 | 8 |
| Cao Yanhua | Table tennis | 1978–1982 | F | 5 | 0 | 1 | 6 |
| Mo Huilan | Gymnastics | 1994 | F | 5 | 0 | 1 | 6 |
| Xu Dan | Shooting | 1994–2002 | M | 5 | 0 | 1 | 6 |
| Du Li | Shooting | 2002–2006 | F | 5 | 0 | 0 | 5 |
| Jiang Tingting | Synchronized swimming | 2006–2010 | F | 5 | 0 | 0 | 5 |
| Jiang Wenwen | Synchronized swimming | 2006–2010 | F | 5 | 0 | 0 | 5 |
| Li Xiaoxia | Table tennis | 2006–2010 | F | 5 | 0 | 0 | 5 |
| Qiu Bo | Shooting | 1982–1986 | M | 5 | 0 | 0 | 5 |
| Sun Yingsha | Table tennis | 2018–2022 | F | 5 | 0 | 0 | 5 |

== Asian Winter Games ==
*Red border color indicates tournament was held on home soil.

=== Medals by Games ===
| Games | Athletes | Rank | Gold | Silver | Bronze | Total |
|---|---|---|---|---|---|---|
| (Japan) 1986 Sapporo | 63 | 2 | 4 | 5 | 12 | 21 |
| (Japan) 1990 Sapporo | 73 | 2 | 9 | 9 | 8 | 26 |
| (China) 1996 Harbin | 280 | 1 | 15 | 7 | 15 | 37 |
| (South Korea) 1999 Gangwon | 147 | 1 | 15 | 10 | 11 | 36 |
| (Japan) 2003 Aomori | 175 | 3 | 9 | 11 | 13 | 33 |
| (China) 2007 Changchun | 159 | 1 | 19 | 19 | 23 | 61 |
| (Kazakhstan) 2011 Astana & Almaty | 134 | 4 | 11 | 10 | 14 | 35 |
| (Japan) 2017 Sapporo & Obihiro | 156 | 3 | 12 | 14 | 9 | 35 |
| (China) 2025 Harbin | 170 | 1 | 32 | 27 | 26 | 85 |
| Total | 1,357 | 2 | 126 | 112 | 131 | 369 |

== Asian Para Games ==
*Red border color indicates tournament was held on home soil.

=== Medals by Games ===
| Games | Athletes | Rank | Gold | Silver | Bronze | Total |
|---|---|---|---|---|---|---|
| 2010 Guangzhou | 464 | 1 | 185 | 118 | 88 | 391 |
| 2014 Incheon | 234 | 1 | 174 | 95 | 48 | 317 |
| 2018 Jakarta | 231 | 1 | 172 | 88 | 59 | 319 |
| 2022 Hangzhou | 439 | 1 | 214 | 167 | 140 | 521 |
| Total | 1,368 | 1 | 745 | 468 | 335 | 1548 |

== Asian Beach Games ==
*Red border color indicates tournament was held on home soil.

=== Medals by Games ===
| Games | Rank | Gold | Silver | Bronze | Total |
|---|---|---|---|---|---|
| 2008 Bali | 3 | 6 | 10 | 7 | 23 |
| 2010 Muscat | 2 | 12 | 6 | 5 | 23 |
| 2012 Haiyang | 1 | 14 | 10 | 12 | 36 |
| 2014 Phuket | 2 | 16 | 11 | 21 | 48 |
| 2016 Da Nang | 3 | 12 | 18 | 19 | 49 |
| 2026 Sanya | 1 | 24 | 18 | 13 | 55 |
| Total | 2 | 84 | 73 | 77 | 234 |

== Asian Indoor and Martial Arts Games ==
=== Medals by Games ===
| Games | Rank | Gold | Silver | Bronze | Total |
Asian Indoor Games
| 2005 Bangkok | 1 | 24 | 18 | 15 | 57 |
| 2007 Macau | 1 | 52 | 26 | 24 | 102 |
| 2009 Hanoi | 1 | 48 | 25 | 19 | 92 |
Asian Martial Arts Games
| 2009 Bangkok | 4 | 9 | 5 | 5 | 19 |
Asian Indoor and Martial Arts Games
| 2013 Incheon | 1 | 29 | 13 | 10 | 52 |
| 2017 Ashgabat | 2 | 42 | 32 | 23 | 97 |
| Total | 1 | 204 | 120 | 95 | 419 |

== Asian Youth Games ==
*Red border color indicates tournament was held on home soil.

=== Medals by Games ===
| Games | Rank | Gold | Silver | Bronze | Total |
|---|---|---|---|---|---|
| 2009 Singapore | 1 | 25 | 16 | 11 | 52 |
| 2013 Nanjing | 1 | 46 | 23 | 24 | 93 |
| 2021 Manama | 1 | 63 | 49 | 35 | 147 |
| Total | 1 | 134 | 88 | 70 | 292 |

== Asian Youth Para Games ==
=== Medals by Games ===
| Games | Rank | Gold | Silver | Bronze | Total |
|---|---|---|---|---|---|
| 2009 Tokyo | 3 | 23 | 5 | 0 | 28 |
| 2013 Kuala Lumpur | 3 | 25 | 8 | 5 | 38 |
| 2017 Singapore | 3 | 27 | 9 | 5 | 41 |
| 2021 Manama | did not participate | | | | |
| Total | 3 | 75 | 22 | 10 | 107 |

== East Asian Games ==
*Red border color indicates tournament was held on home soil.

=== Medals by Games ===
| Games | Rank | Gold | Silver | Bronze | Total |
|---|---|---|---|---|---|
| 1993 Shanghai | 1 | 105 | 74 | 34 | 213 |
| 1997 Busan | 1 | 62 | 59 | 64 | 185 |
| 2001 Osaka | 1 | 85 | 48 | 58 | 191 |
| 2005 Macau | 1 | 127 | 63 | 33 | 223 |
| 2009 Hong Kong | 1 | 113 | 73 | 46 | 232 |
| 2013 Tianjin | 1 | 134 | 79 | 51 | 264 |
| Total | 1 | 626 | 396 | 285 | 1307 |

== Doping ==
Systematic doping of Chinese athletes in Olympic Games (and other international sport events) revealed by Xue Yinxian in 2012 and 2017. He claimed more than 10,000 athletes in China were doped in the systematic Chinese government doping program and that they received performance enhancing drugs in the 1980s and 1990s. He stated that all international medals (Both in the Olympics and other international competitions) that were won by Chinese athletes in the 1980s and 1990s (1980 to 2000) should be taken back. This is contrary to previous statements made by the Chinese government that denied involvement in systematic doping, claiming that athletes doped individually. The International Olympic Committee and World Anti-Doping Agency investigated these allegations with no conclusions given.

=== Disqualified medalists ===
| Name | NOC | Sport | Banned substance | Medals | Ref |
|---|---|---|---|---|---|
| Han Qing | China | Athletics | Dihydrotestosterone | (gold) (Women's 400 m hurdles) | |
| Zhang Lei | China | Canoeing | Dihydrotestosterone | (gold) (Men's C-1 500 m); (gold) (Men's C-1 1000 m); (silver) (Men's C-2 500 m) | |
| Qiu Suoren | China | Canoeing | Dihydrotestosterone | (silver) (Men's C-2 1000 m) | |
| Wang Yan | China | Cycling | Dihydrotestosterone | (gold) (Women's sprint) | |
| Fu Yong | China | Swimming | Dihydrotestosterone | (bronze) (Men's 400 m individual medley) | |
| Hu Bin | China | Swimming | Dihydrotestosterone | (gold) (Men's 50 m freestyle) | |
| Lü Bin | China | Swimming | Dihydrotestosterone | (gold) (Women's 50 m freestyle); (gold) (Women's 200 m freestyle); (gold) (Women's 200 m individual medley); (gold) (Women's 4 × 100 m freestyle relay); (silver) (Women's 100 m freestyle); (silver) (Women's 100 m backstroke) | |
| Xiong Guoming | China | Swimming | Dihydrotestosterone | (gold) (Men's 200 m freestyle); (gold) (Men's 200 m individual medley); (gold) (Men's 400 m individual medley); (gold) (Men's 4 × 200 m freestyle relay); (silver) (Men's 4 × 100 m freestyle relay) | |
| Yang Aihua | China | Swimming | Dihydrotestosterone | (silver) (Women's 400 m freestyle) | |
| Zhang Bin | China | Swimming | Dihydrotestosterone | (gold) (Men's 200 m butterfly) | |
| Zhou Guanbin | China | Swimming | Dihydrotestosterone | (gold) (Women's 400 m freestyle); (silver) (Women's 800 m freestyle) | |

== See also ==
- China at the Olympics
- Sports in China
