= Macau at the 2017 Asian Winter Games =

- IOC code: MAC
- NOC: Macau Olympic Committee

in Sapporo and Obihiro February 19–26
- Competitors: 23 in 1 sport
- Medals: Gold 0 Silver 0 Bronze 0 Total 0

Asian Winter Games appearances
- 2007; 2011; 2017; 2025; 2029

Macau is scheduled to compete in the 2017 Asian Winter Games in Sapporo and Obihiro, Japan from February 19 to 26. The country is scheduled to compete in one sport: ice hockey. The Macanese team consists of 23 athletes.

== Background ==
Macau is scheduled to return to competition after missing the last edition of the games in 2011. The country has only competed in one sport at the games: hockey.

== Competitors ==
The following table lists the Macanese delegation per sport and gender.

Sport	Men	Women	Total
Ice hockey	23	0	23
Total	23	0	23

== Ice hockey ==
Macau has entered a men's hockey team. The team is scheduled to compete in division 2. Macau finished in fourth place (14th place overall) in division 2 of the competition.

=== Men's tournament ===
Macau was represented by the following 23 athletes:

- Chu Te-lin (G)
- Tong Chang-wa (G)
- Vong Wai-tong (G)
- Chan Chi-kit (D)
- Chon Ka-miu (D)
- Ho Chon-nin (D)
- Iun Chi-fong (D)
- Kong Chong-man (D)
- Lai Neng (D)
- Leong Chon-kong (D)
- Chan Ka-lok (F)
- Fong Chou-tek (F)
- Fong Keng-lam (F)
- Guan Chentao (F)
- Lei Meng-chi (F)
- Jonay Leung (F)
- Mok Kim-hei (F)
- Mok Kim-kei (F)
- Pong Ka-kit (F)
- Shinoda Katsuyoshi (F)
- Tam Weng-leong (F)
- U Chi-fong (F)
- Un Kin-fai (F)

Legend: G = Goalie, D = Defense, F = Forward

Group B

Rank	Team	Pld	W	OW	OL	L	GF	GA	GD	Pts
1	Turkmenistan	3	3	0	0	0	37	4	+33	9
2	Macau	3	2	0	0	1	15	22	–7	6
3	Malaysia	3	1	0	0	2	19	20	–1	3
4	Indonesia	3	0	0	0	3	6	31	–25	0

21 February 2017; 9:30	Macau	0–16 (0–6, 0–4, 0–6)	Turkmenistan	Hoshioki Ice Skating Rink; Attendance: 155

Game reference
14 min	Penalties	6 min
8	Shots	66

23 February 2017; 13:00	Macau	6–2 (2–0, 4–0, 0–2)	Indonesia	Hoshioki Ice Skating Rink; Attendance: 87

Game reference
22 min	Penalties	14 min
42	Shots	25

24 February 2017; 9:30	Malaysia	4–9 (1–2, 2–4, 2–3)	Macau	Hoshioki Ice Skating Rink; Attendance: 110

Game reference
50 min	Penalties	16 min
40	Shots	24

13th place match

26 February 2017; 9:00	Philippines	9–2 (5–0, 2–1, 2–1)	Macau	Hoshioki Ice Skating Rink; Attendance: 208

Game reference
6 min	Penalties	4 min
42	Shots	25
