= Macau at the 2025 Asian Winter Games =

- Flag of Macau
- IOC code: MAC
- NOC: Macau Olympic Committee

in Harbin, China 7 February 2025 – 14 February 2025
- Competitors: 21 in 1 sport
- Flag bearers: Leong Chon Kong & Cheong Hio Lam
- Medals: Gold 0 Silver 0 Bronze 0 Total 0

Asian Winter Games appearances
- 2007; 2011; 2017; 2025; 2029

Macau competed at the 2025 Asian Winter Games in Harbin, China, from February 7 to 14. The Macau team consisted of 21 men's ice hockey players. Hockey player Leong Chon Kong and team official Cheong Hio Lam were the country's opening ceremony flagbearers.

== Competitors ==
The following table lists the Macao delegation per sport and gender.

Sport	Men	Women	Total
Ice hockey	21	0	21
Total	21	0	21

== Ice hockey ==
=== Men's tournament ===
Macau qualified a men's hockey team. The Macau team qualified after being invited following the initial announcement of the first 12 qualified teams. The Macau team finished the competition in 13th place out of 14 teams. The win over Bahrain was Macau's first victory since 2019 and its first ever victory in a major sporting event.

Macau was represented by the following 21 athletes:

- Cheng Sao (F)
- Chon Ka Miu (D)
- Guan Chentao (F)
- Ho Hou (G)
- Hong Argus (F)
- Hu Zhaoting (D)
- Leong Weng Hei (F)
- Kong Chong Man (D)
- Ku Hio Tong (D)
- Lao Chichong (F)
- Lao Chon Hou (D)
- Lei Pak (F)
- Leong Chon Kong (D)
- Leung Manlong (G)
- Li Chon Hei (F)
- Lin Zhi Hang (F)
- Shinoda Katsuyoshi (F)
- Sou Edison (F)
- Un Kinfai (F)
- Wong Kitcheng (D)
- Yeung Ho Yin (F)

Legend: G = Goalie, D = Defense, F = Forward

Group stage

Pos	Team	Pld	W	OW	OL	L	GF	GA	GD	Pts	Qualification
1	Hong Kong	3	3	0	0	0	61	2	+59	9	Quarterfinals
2	Turkmenistan	3	2	0	0	1	46	6	+40	6	Placement 9–10
3	India	3	1	0	0	2	5	51	−46	3	Placement 11–12
4	Macau	3	0	0	0	3	3	56	−53	0	Placement 13–14

Source: OCA

3 February; 21:00	Hong Kong	26–1 (12–0, 6–0, 8–1)	Macau	Harbin Ice Hockey Arena, Harbin; Attendance: 1,608

Game reference

Cheung Ching Ho
David Lam
Goalies
Leung Manlong
Referee:
Wang Gongbo (CHN)

Tong (B. Tang) – 01:18	1–0
Wang (SH) – 03:07	2–0
Chu (Yam Ya.) (SH) – 03:58	3–0
Lee (Sham) – 05:28	4–0
B. Tang (J. Tang, Y. Wong) – 05:58	5–0
Chan (Leung, Wang) – 06:40	6–0
Tong (B. Tang) – 08:21	7–0
J. Tang (Ngan, Yam Ya.) – 09:43	8–0
Wang (To, Sham) – 10:04	9–0
Tong (Yam Ya.) – 12:46	10–0
Tong (Lee, To) (PP) – 16:56	11–0
B. Tang (Elmer, Cheng) – 19:25	12–0
B. Tang (Lee, Tong) – 22:37	13–0
Mak (Cheng, Leung) – 25:49	14–0
Lee (Chu, Wong K.) – 28:43	15–0
J. Tang – 30:09	16–0
Tong (Chu, Yam Ya.) – 34:18	17–0
B. Tang (Tong, Chu) – 39:14	18–0
B. Tang (Tong, Yuen) – 45:01	19–0
Tong (Chu, B. Tang) – 45:39	20–0
Cheng (Elmer) – 46:31	21–0
Wong K. – 47:14	22–0
Chu (Tong) – 50:37	23–0
	23–1	55:20 – Hong (SH)
Elmer (B. Tang) (SH) – 56:33	24–1
Wang (B. Tang, Chan) (SH) – 57:47	25–1
Tong (Mak, B. Tang) – 59:50	26–1

10 min
Penalties
10 min
111
Shots
4

5 February; 21:00	Turkmenistan	26–0 (6–0, 5–0, 15–0)	Macau	Harbin Sport University Stadium, Harbin; Attendance: 393

Game reference

Keremli Çaryýew
Taňryberdi Guwanjow
Goalies
Leung Manlong
Referee:
Li Ho Ching (HKG)

Baýjaýew (Taňňyýew, Gurbanow) – 00:28	1–0
Baýmyradow (Kakajanow, Aganyýazow) – 02:02	2–0
Nuryýew (Baýhanow, Baýmyradow) – 04:16	3–0
Gurbanow (Wahowskiý, Hydyrow) – 05:29	4–0
Annasaparow (Esenow, Döwletmyradow) – 08:35	5–0
Döwletmyradow (Geldimyradow, Kakabaýew) (SH) – 13:32	6–0
Kakajanow (Baýmyradow, Baýhanow) (PP) – 21:12	7–0
Durdyýew (Geldimyradow, Orazow) – 26:20	8–0
Baýmyradow (Baýhanow) – 33:01	9–0
Orazow (Durdyýew, Kakaýew) – 33:59	10–0
Baýmyradow (Nuryýew, Aganyýazow) – 35:45	11–0
Taňňyýew (Gurbanow, Baýjaýew) – 41:13	12–0
Geldimyradow – 43:09	13–0
Baýmyradow (Nuryýew, Aganyýazow) – 45:44	14–0
Baýhanow (Aganyýazow) – 46:03	15–0
Gurbanow (Wahowskiý, Taňňyýew) – 47:43	16–0
Döwletmyradow (Geldimyradow, Annasaparow) – 48:22	17–0
Aganyýazow (Baýhanow) (PP) – 52:11	18–0
Baýmyradow (Kakajanow, Baýhanow) – 52:49	19–0
Orazow – 53:38	20–0
Baýjaýew (Taňňyýew, Wahowskiý) – 54:14	21–0
Döwletmyradow – 54:53	22–0
Baýhanow (Baýmyradow, Kakajanow) – 55:32	23–0
Nuryýew (Baýhanow, Kakaýew) – 56:27	24–0
Aganyýazow (Baýmyradow, Baýjaýew) (SH) – 57:17	25–0
Döwletmyradow (Geldimyradow) – 58:55	26–0

12 min
Penalties
8 min
101
Shots
4

9 February; 13:00	Macau	2–4 (0–2, 2–1, 0–1)	India	Harbin Ice Hockey Arena, Harbin; Attendance: 2,900

Game reference

Leung Manlong
Goalies
Lotus Chamba
Referee:
Faris Hakimin Yusoff (MAS)

	0–1	05:37 – Baba (Angchuk)
	0–2	12:24 – Ismail (A. Dorjay)
	0–3	27:50 – Angchuk (Angdus, Kunzang) (PP)
Sou (PP) – 33:05	1–3
Sou – 37:11	2–3
	2–4	47:40 – Angdus (T. Dorjay)

4 min
Penalties
14 min
23
Shots
42

Thirteenth place game

10 February; 9:00	Macau	4–3 OT (0–1, 1–1, 2–1) (OT: 1–0)	Bahrain	Harbin Sport University Stadium, Harbin; Attendance: 507

Game reference

Leung Manlong
Goalies
Abdulla Al-Adhab
Referee:
Timur Morev (KAZ)

	0–1	18:11 – Hegazi (Al-Bahri, Masaud) (PP)
Shinoda (Sou) – 32:33	1–1
	1–2	33:16 – Masaud (Al-Salah, Hegazi)
	1–3	41:59 – Al-Mutawa (Masaud)
Sou (Hong, Shinoda) (PP) – 45:31	2–3
Yeung (Kong) – 52:52	3–3
Cheng (Wong, Leong) – 63:17	4–3

10 min
Penalties
14 min
43
Shots
21
