= Ayumi Fukushima =

Japanese breakdancer (born 1983)

Ayumi Fukushima 福島あゆみ
Personal information
- Born: 22 June 1983 (age 43) Kyoto Prefecture, Japan

Sport
- Country: Japan
- Sport: Breaking
Medal record
Breaking
Representing Japan
WDSF World Championships
Gold medal – first place	2021 Paris	B-Girls
Silver medal – second place	2023 Leuven	B-Girls
Bronze medal – third place	2022 Seoul	B-Girls
Red Bull BC One World Final
Runner-up	2019 Mumbai	B-Girls
Olympic Qualifier Series
Gold medal – first place	2024 Shanghai	B-Girls
Silver medal – second place	2024 Budapest	B-Girls
World Games
Bronze medal – third place	2022 Birmingham	B-Girls
Asian Games
Silver medal – second place	2026 Aichi–Nagoya	B-Girls
Bronze medal – third place	2022 Hangzhou	B-Girls
WDSF Asian Championships
Gold medal – first place	2023 Hangzhou	B-Girls
FUJIFILM INSTAX Undisputed Masters
Winner	2022 The Notorious IBE	Solo Women
Outbreak Europe
Winner	2017	2vs2 Breaking
Winner	2020	1vs1 B-Girl

Ayumi Fukushima (福島 あゆみ, Fukushima Ayumi; born 22 June 1983), also known as Ayumi, is a Japanese breakdancer. She competed at the 2022 World Games in the dancesport competition, winning the bronze medal in the B-Girls event. In 2021, Fukushima won the world championship in a competition in France. She also participated at a Red Bull BC One competition. Ayumi works as a schoolteacher.

Ayumi represented Japan in Breaking at the 2024 Summer Olympics, where she made it to the final eight but lost 2–1 to India Sardjoe.
