= Liu Qingyi =

Chinese breakdancer (born 2005)

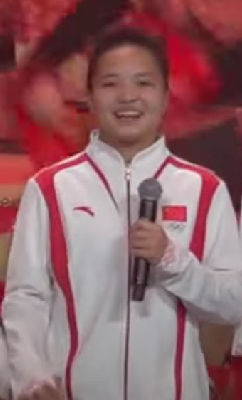
- Liu in 2024

Personal information
- Native name: 刘清漪
- Nickname: 671
- Born: 19 October 2005 (age 20) Huixian, Henan, China

Sport
- Country: China
- Sport: Breaking
Medal record
Breaking
Representing China
Olympic Games
Bronze medal – third place	2024 Paris	B-Girls
World Games
Silver medal – second place	2025 Chengdu	B-Girls
WDSF World Championships
Silver medal – second place	2022 Seoul	B-Girls
Silver medal – second place	2024 Chengdu	B-Girls
Red Bull BC One World Final
Runner-up	2023 Paris	B-Girls
Asian Games
Gold medal – first place	2022 Hangzhou	B-Girls
Bronze medal – third place	2026 Aichi–Nagoya	B-Girls
FUJIFILM INSTAX Undisputed Masters
Runner-up	2023 The Notorious IBE	Solo Women
Outbreak Europe
Winner	2022	1vs1 B-Girl

Liu Qingyi (simplified Chinese: 刘清漪; traditional Chinese: 劉清漪; pinyin: Liú Qīngyī; born 19 October 2005), also known as 671, is a Chinese breakdancer who represented China in the 2024 Summer Olympic Games, and won the bronze medal in the B-Girls competition.

Liu won gold at the 2022 Asian Games for women's breakdancing, becoming the first Chinese breakdancer to be a medallist and qualifying for the 2024 Summer Olympics. She won silver in the 2022 WDSF World Breaking Championships in South Korea.

Her nickname 671 is because the numbers are pronounced similarly to her name in Chinese (Chinese: 六七一; pinyin: Liù qī yī). Liu began breakdancing at ten years old.
