= Macau at the 2007 Asian Winter Games =

- IOC code: MAC
- NOC: Macau Sports and Olympic Committee

in Changchun
- Competitors: 26

Asian Winter Games appearances
- 2007; 2011; 2017; 2025; 2029

Macau, under the name of 'Macau, China', participated in the 2007 Asian Winter Games held in Changchun, China from January 28, 2007 to February 4, 2007.
