= China at the 2002 Asian Games =

- IOC code: CHN
- NOC: Chinese Olympic Committee external link (in Chinese and English)

in Busan
- Medals Ranked 1st: Gold 150 Silver 84 Bronze 74 Total 308

Asian Games appearances (overview)
- 1974; 1978; 1982; 1986; 1990; 1994; 1998; 2002; 2006; 2010; 2014; 2018; 2022; 2026

China competed in the 2002 Asian Games held in Busan, South Korea from September 29, 2002 to October 14, 2002.

China achieved a historic milestone by surpassing the 300-medal threshold in a single edition, so becoming the first nation to do so in the history of the Asian Games.

== See also ==
- China at the Asian Games
- China at the Olympics
- Sport in China
