= Breaking at the 2026 Asian Games – B-Girls =

B-Girls at the 2026 Asian Games
- Venue: Aichi International Exhibition Center
- Date: 2–3 October 2026
- Competitors: 17 from 9 nations

Medalists
gold medal	Guo Pu	China
silver medal	Ayumi Fukushima	Japan
bronze medal	Liu Qingyi	China

The B-Girls breaking event at the 2026 Asian Games was held at the Aichi International Exhibition Center in Tokoname, Aichi Prefecture, Japan, from 2 to 3 October 2026. Guo Pu (Royal) won the gold medal, defeating Ayumi Fukushima (Ayumi) in the gold medal battle, while defending champion Liu Qingyi (671) took the bronze medal.

== Schedule ==
All times are Japan Standard Time (UTC+09:00)

Date	Time	Event
Friday, 2 October 2026	14:00	Pre-selection
Friday, 2 October 2026	16:00	Round of 16
Saturday, 3 October 2026	14:04	Quarterfinals
Saturday, 3 October 2026	15:54	Semifinals
Saturday, 3 October 2026	16:38	Finals

== Results ==
=== Pre-selection ===
Rank	Athlete	Score
1	Guo Pu (CHN)	84.06
2	Liu Qingyi (CHN)	83.21
3	Ayumi Fukushima (JPN)	81.33
4	Ayane Nakarai (JPN)	78.93
5	Kwon Seong-hui (KOR)	78.60
6	Yang Jia-li (TPE)	76.77
7	Kim Ye-ri (KOR)	75.53
8	Sayora Alibekova (KAZ)	75.44
9	Hsu Fu-ya (TPE)	70.74
10	Võ Thị Thanh Hương (VIE)	67.56
11	Nguyễn Thị Hồng Trâm (VIE)	64.13
12	Aizara Zhumabekova (KAZ)	63.06
13	Vacharapa Orankicharoen (THA)	54.34
14	Thanawadee Suthisiri (THA)	52.53
15	Myagmarjavyn Khandjav (MGL)	42.36
16	Lola Rajabova (TJK)	39.49
17	Amina Rahimova (TJK)	35.51

=== Knockout round ===
Round of 16
16	Lola Rajabova (TJK)	0	0
1	Guo Pu (CHN)	9	9
8	Sayora Alibekova (KAZ)	4	6	1
9	Hsu Fu-ya (TPE)	5	3	8
5	Kwon Seong-hui (KOR)	9	7
12	Aizara Zhumabekova (KAZ)	0	2
4	Ayane Nakarai (JPN)	9	9
13	Vacharapa Orankicharoen (THA)	0	0
15	Myagmarjavyn Khandjav (MGL)	0	0
2	Liu Qingyi (CHN)	9	9
10	Võ Thị Thanh Hương (VIE)	0	0
7	Kim Ye-ri (KOR)	9	9
6	Yang Jia-li (TPE)	8	7
11	Nguyễn Thị Hồng Trâm (VIE)	1	2
14	Thanawadee Suthisiri (THA)	0	0
3	Ayumi Fukushima (JPN)	9	9

Quarterfinals
1	Guo Pu (CHN)	9	8
9	Hsu Fu-ya (TPE)	0	1
5	Kwon Seong-hui (KOR)	0	1
4	Ayane Nakarai (JPN)	9	8
2	Liu Qingyi (CHN)	9	7
7	Kim Ye-ri (KOR)	0	2
6	Yang Jia-li (TPE)	1	0
3	Ayumi Fukushima (JPN)	8	9

Semifinals
1	Guo Pu (CHN)	9	8	9
4	Ayane Nakarai (JPN)	0	1	0
2	Liu Qingyi (CHN)	6	1	3
3	Ayumi Fukushima (JPN)	3	8	6

Gold medal battle
1	Guo Pu (CHN)	9	9	9
3	Ayumi Fukushima (JPN)	0	0	0
Bronze medal battle
4	Ayane Nakarai (JPN)	3	2	1
2	Liu Qingyi (CHN)	6	7	8
