= Dancesport at the 2010 Asian Games – Cha-cha-cha =

Cha-cha-cha at the 2010 Asian Games
- Venue: Zengcheng Gymnasium
- Date: 14 November 2010
- Competitors: 22 from 11 nations

Medalists
gold medal	Shi Lei; Zhang Baiyu	China
silver medal	Kim Do-hyeon; Park Su-myo	South Korea
bronze medal	Ronnie Vergara; Charlea Lagaras	Philippines

The cha-cha-cha competition at the 2010 Asian Games in Guangzhou was held on 14 November at the Zengcheng Gymnasium.

== Schedule ==
All times are China Standard Time (UTC+08:00)

Date	Time	Event
Sunday, 14 November 2010	15:35	Quarterfinal
Sunday, 14 November 2010	16:05	Semifinal
Sunday, 14 November 2010	17:15	Final

== Results ==
=== Quarterfinal ===
Rank	Team	Judges									Total
Rank	Team	A	B	C	D	E	F	G	H	I	Total
1	Shi Lei / Zhang Baiyu (CHN)	1	1	1	1	1	1	1	1	1	9
2	Ronnie Vergara / Charlea Lagaras (PHI)	1	1	0	1	1	1	1	1	1	8
3	Kim Do-hyeon / Park Su-myo (KOR)	1	0	1	1	1	1	0	1	1	7
3	Peng Yen-ming / Chi Hsin-chi (TPE)	1	0	1	1	1	1	1	0	1	7
5	Ng Sum Chun / Lam Wai Yi (HKG)	1	0	1	0	1	1	1	1	0	6
6	Fong Wai Kin / U Mei Kok (MAC)	0	1	0	0	1	1	1	0	1	5
7	Yuki Suzuki / Kana Suzuki (JPN)	0	0	0	1	0	0	1	1	1	4
7	Artur Sabitov / Kristina Grigoryan (KAZ)	1	1	1	0	0	0	0	1	0	4
9	Kunanon Potisit / Phichittra Leksuma (THA)	0	1	1	0	0	0	0	0	0	2
9	Ngô Minh Đức / Cao Thị Vân Diễm (VIE)	0	1	0	1	0	0	0	0	0	2
11	Mher Kandoyan / Carolina Karam (LIB)	0	0	0	0	0	0	0	0	0	0

=== Semifinal ===
Rank	Team	Judges									Total
Rank	Team	A	B	C	D	E	F	G	H	I	Total
1	Shi Lei / Zhang Baiyu (CHN)	1	1	1	1	1	1	1	1	1	9
2	Fong Wai Kin / U Mei Kok (MAC)	0	1	1	1	1	1	1	1	1	8
3	Kim Do-hyeon / Park Su-myo (KOR)	1	1	1	1	0	1	1	0	1	7
4	Peng Yen-ming / Chi Hsin-chi (TPE)	1	0	0	1	1	1	1	0	1	6
5	Artur Sabitov / Kristina Grigoryan (KAZ)	1	1	1	0	1	0	0	1	0	5
6	Yuki Suzuki / Kana Suzuki (JPN)	0	0	0	1	0	0	1	1	1	4
6	Ronnie Vergara / Charlea Lagaras (PHI)	0	1	0	0	1	1	0	1	0	4
8	Ng Sum Chun / Lam Wai Yi (HKG)	1	0	1	0	0	0	0	0	0	2

=== Final ===
Rank	Team	Judges									Total
Rank	Team	A	B	C	D	E	F	G	H	I	Total
1st place, gold medalist(s)	Shi Lei / Zhang Baiyu (CHN)	43.50	42.00	40.00	42.00	41.50	42.50	42.00	43.50	42.50	42.29
2nd place, silver medalist(s)	Kim Do-hyeon / Park Su-myo (KOR)	35.50	36.50	38.50	39.00	35.00	42.50	37.50	36.50	39.50	37.57
3rd place, bronze medalist(s)	Ronnie Vergara / Charlea Lagaras (PHI)	36.50	41.00	33.00	37.00	38.50	38.50	35.00	38.00	32.50	36.71
4	Yuki Suzuki / Kana Suzuki (JPN)	34.00	35.00	36.50	38.00	31.00	36.00	36.50	38.00	38.50	36.21
5	Artur Sabitov / Kristina Grigoryan (KAZ)	36.00	38.00	38.50	37.00	34.50	34.00	35.50	36.50	33.50	35.93
6	Peng Yen-ming / Chi Hsin-chi (TPE)	33.50	31.50	34.50	37.50	36.00	36.50	35.50	35.00	32.00	34.79
7	Fong Wai Kin / U Mei Kok (MAC)	31.00	36.00	33.50	32.50	31.00	37.00	38.00	35.00	36.00	34.50
