= Dancesport at the 1998 Asian Games =

- Venue: Thai-Japanese Stadium
- Dates: 7–8 December 1998
- Competitors: 52 from 8 nations

Dancesport at the 1998 Asian Games was held in Thai-Japanese Stadium, Bangkok, Thailand from December 7 to 8, 1998 as a demonstration sport.

There were two events at the competition, standard dance and the Latin dance,

== Medalists ==
Event	Gold	Silver	Bronze
Standard	Chinese Taipei; Mark Lin; Ruby Chaing	China; Shen Yi; Huang Wenjuan	China; Wang Yi; Duan Baohua
Latin	Thailand; Surachai Sriprapat; Weerawan Sriprapat	Chinese Taipei; Danny Tsai; Jenny Chiu	China; Ma Chun; Wang Rui

== Medal table ==
Rank	Nation	Gold	Silver	Bronze	Total
1	Chinese Taipei (TPE)	1	1	0	2
2	Thailand (THA)	1	0	0	1
3	China (CHN)	0	1	2	3
Totals (3 entries)		2	2	2	6

== Participating nations ==
A total of 52 athletes from 8 nations competed in dancesport at the 1998 Asian Games:

- China (8)
- Chinese Taipei (6)
- Hong Kong (4)
- Indonesia (4)
- Malaysia (6)
- Philippines (8)
- Singapore (8)
- Thailand (8)
