= Breaking at the 2022 Asian Games – B-Girls =

B-Girls at the 2022 Asian Games
- Venue: Gongshu Canal Sports Park Gymnasium
- Date: 6–7 October 2023
- Competitors: 20 from 12 nations

Medalists
gold medal	Liu Qingyi	China
silver medal	Ami Yuasa	Japan
bronze medal	Ayumi Fukushima	Japan

The B-Girls` breaking event at the 2022 Asian Games was held in Gongshu Canal Sports Park Gymnasium, Hangzhou from 6 to 7 October 2023.

== Schedule ==
All times are China Standard Time (UTC+08:00)

Date	Time	Event
Friday, 6 October 2023	15:30	Pre-selection
Friday, 6 October 2023	18:30	Round robin
Saturday, 7 October 2023	18:40	Knockouts
Saturday, 7 October 2023	19:40	Semifinals
Saturday, 7 October 2023	20:06	Finals

== Results ==
=== Pre-selection ===
Rank	Athlete	Score
1	Ayumi Fukushima (JPN)	770.6
2	Ami Yuasa (JPN)	763.8
3	Liu Qingyi (CHN)	737.8
4	Zeng Yingying (CHN)	734.8
5	Kwon Seong-hui (KOR)	701.7
6	Yang Jia-li (TPE)	698.7
7	Jeon Ji-ye (KOR)	698.5
8	Sayora Alibekova (KAZ)	677.8
9	Trần Huỳnh Như (VIE)	634.7
10	Chen Yi-ru (TPE)	622.7
11	Nguyễn Thị Hồng Trâm (VIE)	598.0
12	Thanawadee Suthisiri (THA)	558.4
13	Alyanna Talam (PHI)	557.9
14	Wong Chiu Wai (HKG)	553.0
15	Chan Ka Yi (HKG)	532.5
16	Myagmarjavyn Khandjav (MGL)	509.0
17	Asal Saparbaeva (UZB)	467.5
18	Areerat Numto (THA)	357.7
19	Nisso Odinaeva (TJK)	268.2
20	Aziza Kayumova (TJK)	189.3

=== Round robin ===
==== Group A ====
Pos	Athlete	Pld	W	D	L	Rnd	V	Qualification
1	Ayumi Fukushima (JPN)	3	3	0	0	6	52	Knockouts
2	Sayora Alibekova (KAZ)	3	2	0	1	4	33	Knockouts
3	Trần Huỳnh Như (VIE)	3	0	1	2	1	16	
4	Myagmarjavyn Khandjav (MGL)	3	0	1	2	1	7	

Source: WDSF

	Score		Rnd 1	Rnd 2
Sayora Alibekova (KAZ)	0–2	Ayumi Fukushima (JPN)	0–9	0–9
Myagmarjavyn Khandjav (MGL)	1–1	Trần Huỳnh Như (VIE)	1–8	6–3
Ayumi Fukushima (JPN)	2–0	Trần Huỳnh Như (VIE)	8–1	8–1
Myagmarjavyn Khandjav (MGL)	0–2	Sayora Alibekova (KAZ)	0–9	0–9
Myagmarjavyn Khandjav (MGL)	0–2	Ayumi Fukushima (JPN)	0–9	0–9
Trần Huỳnh Như (VIE)	0–2	Sayora Alibekova (KAZ)	0–9	3–6

==== Group B ====
Pos	Athlete	Pld	W	D	L	Rnd	V	Qualification
1	Ami Yuasa (JPN)	3	3	0	0	6	52	Knockouts
2	Jeon Ji-ye (KOR)	3	2	0	1	4	37	Knockouts
3	Chen Yi-ru (TPE)	3	1	0	2	2	18	
4	Chan Ka Yi (HKG)	3	0	0	3	0	1	

Source: WDSF

	Score		Rnd 1	Rnd 2
Ami Yuasa (JPN)	2–0	Jeon Ji-ye (KOR)	7–2	9–0
Chen Yi-ru (TPE)	2–0	Chan Ka Yi (HKG)	8–1	9–0
Chen Yi-ru (TPE)	0–2	Ami Yuasa (JPN)	0–9	0–9
Jeon Ji-ye (KOR)	2–0	Chan Ka Yi (HKG)	9–0	9–0
Ami Yuasa (JPN)	2–0	Chan Ka Yi (HKG)	9–0	9–0
Chen Yi-ru (TPE)	0–2	Jeon Ji-ye (KOR)	1–8	0–9

==== Group C ====
Pos	Athlete	Pld	W	D	L	Rnd	V	Qualification
1	Liu Qingyi (CHN)	3	3	0	0	6	53	Knockouts
2	Yang Jia-li (TPE)	3	2	0	1	4	33	Knockouts
3	Nguyễn Thị Hồng Trâm (VIE)	3	1	0	2	2	17	
4	Wong Chiu Wai (HKG)	3	0	0	3	0	5	

Source: WDSF

	Score		Rnd 1	Rnd 2
Yang Jia-li (TPE)	0–2	Liu Qingyi (CHN)	0–9	0–9
Wong Chiu Wai (HKG)	0–2	Nguyễn Thị Hồng Trâm (VIE)	1–8	1–8
Liu Qingyi (CHN)	2–0	Nguyễn Thị Hồng Trâm (VIE)	9–0	9–0
Yang Jia-li (TPE)	2–0	Wong Chiu Wai (HKG)	7–2	9–0
Liu Qingyi (CHN)	2–0	Wong Chiu Wai (HKG)	9–0	8–1
Yang Jia-li (TPE)	2–0	Nguyễn Thị Hồng Trâm (VIE)	8–1	9–0

==== Group D ====
Pos	Athlete	Pld	W	D	L	Rnd	V	Qualification
1	Zeng Yingying (CHN)	3	3	0	0	6	49	Knockouts
2	Kwon Seong-hui (KOR)	3	2	0	1	4	37	Knockouts
3	Thanawadee Suthisiri (THA)	3	1	0	2	2	14	
4	Alyanna Talam (PHI)	3	0	0	3	0	8	

Source: WDSF

	Score		Rnd 1	Rnd 2
Kwon Seong-hui (KOR)	0–2	Zeng Yingying (CHN)	0–9	3–6
Alyanna Talam (PHI)	0–2	Thanawadee Suthisiri (THA)	3–6	3–6
Zeng Yingying (CHN)	2–0	Thanawadee Suthisiri (THA)	8–1	8–1
Kwon Seong-hui (KOR)	2–0	Alyanna Talam (PHI)	7–2	9–0
Alyanna Talam (PHI)	0–2	Zeng Yingying (CHN)	0–9	0–9
Kwon Seong-hui (KOR)	2–0	Thanawadee Suthisiri (THA)	9–0	9–0

=== Knockout round ===
Knockouts
A2	Sayora Alibekova (KAZ)	0	1
D1	Zeng Yingying (CHN)	9	8
B1	Ami Yuasa (JPN)	9	9
C2	Yang Jia-li (TPE)	0	0
A1	Ayumi Fukushima (JPN)	9	6
D2	Kwon Seong-hui (KOR)	0	3
B2	Jeon Ji-ye (KOR)	0	0
C1	Liu Qingyi (CHN)	9	9

Semifinals
D1	Zeng Yingying (CHN)	1	2	2
B1	Ami Yuasa (JPN)	8	7	7
A1	Ayumi Fukushima (JPN)	5	4	3
C1	Liu Qingyi (CHN)	4	5	6

Gold medal battle
B1	Ami Yuasa (JPN)	3	1	7
C1	Liu Qingyi (CHN)	6	8	2
Bronze medal battle
D1	Zeng Yingying (CHN)	1	1	1
A1	Ayumi Fukushima (JPN)	8	8	8
