= Dancesport at the 2010 Asian Games – Slow foxtrot =

Slow foxtrot at the 2010 Asian Games
- Venue: Zengcheng Gymnasium
- Date: 13 November 2010
- Competitors: 16 from 8 nations

Medalists
gold medal	Wu Zhian; Lei Ying	China
silver medal	Nam Sang-wung; Song Yi-na	South Korea
bronze medal	Tsuyoshi Nukina; Mariko Shibahara	Japan

The slow foxtrot competition at the 2010 Asian Games in Guangzhou was held on 13 November at the Zengcheng Gymnasium.

== Schedule ==
All times are China Standard Time (UTC+08:00)

Date	Time	Event
Saturday, 13 November 2010	15:25	Quarterfinal
Saturday, 13 November 2010	16:10	Semifinal
Saturday, 13 November 2010	17:30	Final

== Results ==
=== Quarterfinal ===
Rank	Team	Judges									Total
Rank	Team	A	B	C	D	E	F	G	H	I	Total
1	Wu Zhian / Lei Ying (CHN)	1	1	1	1	1	1	1	1	1	9
1	Tsuyoshi Nukina / Mariko Shibahara (JPN)	1	1	1	1	1	1	1	1	1	9
1	Nam Sang-wung / Song Yi-na (KOR)	1	1	1	1	1	1	1	1	1	9
1	Pawatpong Racha-apai / Thitiyapa Potimu (THA)	1	1	1	1	1	1	1	1	1	9
5	Chao Chun-lun / Kao Chia-lin (TPE)	1	0	1	1	1	1	1	1	1	8
6	Almat Kambarov / Aktoty Zhappasbayeva (KAZ)	0	1	1	0	1	1	1	0	1	6
7	Emmanuel Reyes / Maira Rosete (PHI)	1	1	0	1	0	0	0	1	0	4
8	Phan Hồng Việt / Hoàng Thu Trang (VIE)	0	0	0	0	0	0	0	0	0	0

=== Semifinal ===
Rank	Team	Judges									Total
Rank	Team	A	B	C	D	E	F	G	H	I	Total
1	Wu Zhian / Lei Ying (CHN)	1	1	1	1	1	1	1	1	1	9
1	Tsuyoshi Nukina / Mariko Shibahara (JPN)	1	1	1	1	1	1	1	1	1	9
1	Nam Sang-wung / Song Yi-na (KOR)	1	1	1	1	1	1	1	1	1	9
4	Almat Kambarov / Aktoty Zhappasbayeva (KAZ)	0	1	0	1	1	0	1	1	1	6
4	Chao Chun-lun / Kao Chia-lin (TPE)	1	0	1	0	1	1	1	0	1	6
6	Pawatpong Racha-apai / Thitiyapa Potimu (THA)	0	1	1	1	0	1	0	0	0	4
7	Emmanuel Reyes / Maira Rosete (PHI)	1	0	0	0	0	0	0	1	0	2

=== Final ===
Rank	Team	Judges									Total
Rank	Team	A	B	C	D	E	F	G	H	I	Total
1st place, gold medalist(s)	Wu Zhian / Lei Ying (CHN)	42.50	39.50	43.00	42.50	44.50	38.50	41.50	41.00	41.00	41.64
2nd place, silver medalist(s)	Nam Sang-wung / Song Yi-na (KOR)	39.50	39.50	41.00	38.50	41.00	41.50	38.00	37.50	38.50	39.36
3rd place, bronze medalist(s)	Tsuyoshi Nukina / Mariko Shibahara (JPN)	36.50	35.50	38.00	36.50	40.50	39.00	36.50	34.00	36.50	36.93
4	Almat Kambarov / Aktoty Zhappasbayeva (KAZ)	32.50	39.00	38.50	36.50	37.50	33.50	36.00	33.50	34.00	35.64
5	Chao Chun-lun / Kao Chia-lin (TPE)	34.00	32.50	36.50	37.00	41.00	36.00	36.50	31.50	32.50	35.07
6	Pawatpong Racha-apai / Thitiyapa Potimu (THA)	31.50	35.00	36.00	33.00	37.50	33.50	33.00	32.00	31.00	33.36
