= Dancesport at the 2010 Asian Games – Waltz =

Tango at the 2010 Asian Games
- Venue: Zengcheng Gymnasium
- Date: 13 November 2010
- Competitors: 20 from 10 nations

Medalists
gold medal	Shen Hong; Liang Yujie	China
silver medal	Masayuki Ishihara; Ayami Kubo	Japan
bronze medal	Jo Sang-hyo; Lee Se-hee	South Korea

The Waltz competition at the 2010 Asian Games in Guangzhou was held on 13 November at the Zengcheng Gymnasium.

== Schedule ==
All times are China Standard Time (UTC+08:00)

Date	Time	Event
Saturday, 13 November 2010	15:15	Quarterfinal
Saturday, 13 November 2010	16:00	Semifinal
Saturday, 13 November 2010	17:00	Final

== Results ==
=== Quarterfinal ===
Rank	Team	Judges									Total
Rank	Team	A	B	C	D	E	F	G	H	I	Total
1	Shen Hong / Liang Yujie (CHN)	1	1	1	1	1	1	1	1	1	9
1	Masayuki Ishihara / Ayami Kubo (JPN)	1	1	1	1	1	1	1	1	1	9
1	Jo Sang-hyo / Lee Se-hee (KOR)	1	1	1	1	1	1	1	1	1	9
1	Yeh Chia-lin / Sun Chi (TPE)	1	1	1	1	1	1	1	1	1	9
5	Almat Kambarov / Aktoty Zhappasbayeva (KAZ)	1	1	1	1	0	0	1	1	1	7
5	Pawatpong Racha-apai / Thitiyapa Potimu (THA)	0	1	1	1	1	1	0	1	1	7
7	Joel Madera / Annabelle Madera (PHI)	1	0	0	0	1	1	1	0	0	4
8	Raed Mourad / Chloe El-Hourani (LIB)	0	0	0	0	0	0	0	0	0	0
8	Ieong Su Kan / Wong Sut Kuai (MAC)	0	0	0	0	0	0	0	0	0	0
8	Phan Hồng Việt / Hoàng Thu Trang (VIE)	0	0	0	0	0	0	0	0	0	0

=== Semifinal ===
Rank	Team	Judges									Total
Rank	Team	A	B	C	D	E	F	G	H	I	Total
1	Shen Hong / Liang Yujie (CHN)	1	1	1	1	1	1	1	1	1	9
1	Masayuki Ishihara / Ayami Kubo (JPN)	1	1	1	1	1	1	1	1	1	9
1	Jo Sang-hyo / Lee Se-hee (KOR)	1	1	1	1	1	1	1	1	1	9
4	Yeh Chia-lin / Sun Chi (TPE)	1	1	1	1	1	1	1	0	1	8
5	Almat Kambarov / Aktoty Zhappasbayeva (KAZ)	0	0	1	1	0	0	1	1	1	5
6	Pawatpong Racha-apai / Thitiyapa Potimu (THA)	0	1	0	0	0	1	0	1	0	3
7	Joel Madera / Annabelle Madera (PHI)	1	0	0	0	1	0	0	0	0	2

=== Final ===
Rank	Team	Judges									Total
Rank	Team	A	B	C	D	E	F	G	H	I	Total
1st place, gold medalist(s)	Shen Hong / Liang Yujie (CHN)	42.00	42.50	43.00	45.00	45.00	40.50	43.00	45.00	40.50	43.14
2nd place, silver medalist(s)	Masayuki Ishihara / Ayami Kubo (JPN)	40.50	43.50	41.50	41.00	41.00	41.00	41.00	43.50	41.50	41.57
3rd place, bronze medalist(s)	Jo Sang-hyo / Lee Se-hee (KOR)	36.00	40.00	40.50	39.50	36.00	43.50	39.50	42.00	33.00	39.07
4	Yeh Chia-lin / Sun Chi (TPE)	31.50	36.00	38.50	37.00	37.50	35.00	39.00	37.50	30.50	36.21
5	Almat Kambarov / Aktoty Zhappasbayeva (KAZ)	33.00	35.00	38.50	37.50	33.50	35.00	36.50	34.50	38.50	35.71
6	Pawatpong Racha-apai / Thitiyapa Potimu (THA)	31.00	35.50	36.50	34.50	34.50	33.50	35.50	34.00	34.00	34.43
