= Dancesport at the 2010 Asian Games – Paso doble =

Paso doble at the 2010 Asian Games
- Venue: Zengcheng Gymnasium
- Date: 14 November 2010
- Competitors: 20 from 10 nations

Medalists
gold medal	Wang Wei; Chen Jin	China
silver medal	Jang Se-jin; Lee Hae-in	South Korea
bronze medal	Ronnie Vergara; Charlea Lagaras	Philippines

The Paso doble competition at the 2010 Asian Games in Guangzhou was held on 14 November at the Zengcheng Gymnasium.

== Schedule ==
All times are China Standard Time (UTC+08:00)

Date	Time	Event
Sunday, 14 November 2010	15:40	Quarterfinal
Sunday, 14 November 2010	16:10	Semifinal
Sunday, 14 November 2010	17:30	Final

== Results ==
=== Quarterfinal ===
Rank	Team	Judges									Total
Rank	Team	A	B	C	D	E	F	G	H	I	Total
1	Wang Wei / Chen Jin (CHN)	1	1	1	1	1	1	1	1	1	9
1	Aleksei Kibkalo / Viktoriya Kachalko (KGZ)	1	1	1	1	1	1	1	1	1	9
3	Tsuneki Masatani / Megumi Saito (JPN)	1	1	1	1	1	0	1	1	1	8
3	Jang Se-jin / Lee Hae-in (KOR)	1	1	1	1	0	1	1	1	1	8
5	Ronnie Vergara / Charlea Lagaras (PHI)	1	1	1	1	1	0	1	0	1	7
6	Theerawut Thommuangpak / Phuthinat Khanitnusorn (THA)	1	0	0	1	1	1	0	1	0	5
7	Abylaikhan Akkubekov / Veronika Popova (KAZ)	0	0	1	0	0	1	0	1	0	3
7	Yang Kuang-chen / Ma Li-ann (TPE)	0	1	0	0	1	0	1	0	0	3
9	Dickson Zhou / Michelle Loi (MAC)	0	0	0	0	0	0	0	0	1	1
9	Phạm Trí Thanh / Bùi Diễm Quỳnh (VIE)	0	0	0	0	0	1	0	0	0	1

=== Semifinal ===
Rank	Team	Judges									Total
Rank	Team	A	B	C	D	E	F	G	H	I	Total
1	Wang Wei / Chen Jin (CHN)	1	1	1	1	1	1	1	1	1	9
1	Aleksei Kibkalo / Viktoriya Kachalko (KGZ)	1	1	1	1	1	1	1	1	1	9
3	Tsuneki Masatani / Megumi Saito (JPN)	1	1	1	1	1	0	1	1	1	8
3	Jang Se-jin / Lee Hae-in (KOR)	1	1	1	1	0	1	1	1	1	8
5	Theerawut Thommuangpak / Phuthinat Khanitnusorn (THA)	0	0	0	1	0	1	1	0	1	4
6	Abylaikhan Akkubekov / Veronika Popova (KAZ)	0	0	1	0	1	0	0	1	0	3
6	Ronnie Vergara / Charlea Lagaras (PHI)	1	1	0	0	0	1	0	0	0	3
8	Yang Kuang-chen / Ma Li-ann (TPE)	0	0	0	0	1	0	0	0	0	1

=== Final ===
Rank	Team	Judges									Total
Rank	Team	A	B	C	D	E	F	G	H	I	Total
1st place, gold medalist(s)	Wang Wei / Chen Jin (CHN)	43.00	40.50	39.50	42.00	41.50	42.50	42.00	42.50	41.00	41.71
2nd place, silver medalist(s)	Jang Se-jin / Lee Hae-in (KOR)	39.00	43.50	40.00	39.50	35.50	42.50	37.50	42.50	41.00	40.29
3rd place, bronze medalist(s)	Ronnie Vergara / Charlea Lagaras (PHI)	36.50	41.00	37.50	40.50	40.00	40.00	37.00	40.00	37.50	38.93
4	Tsuneki Masatani / Megumi Saito (JPN)	39.00	37.00	39.00	36.00	40.50	37.50	35.00	40.00	39.00	38.29
5	Aleksei Kibkalo / Viktoriya Kachalko (KGZ)	32.00	36.50	39.00	40.00	34.00	37.00	35.50	36.50	36.50	36.43
6	Abylaikhan Akkubekov / Veronika Popova (KAZ)	32.00	35.00	38.50	35.00	31.00	37.50	34.50	38.00	35.00	35.29
7	Theerawut Thommuangpak / Phuthinat Khanitnusorn (THA)	31.00	33.50	32.50	33.50	30.50	36.00	34.50	35.00	33.50	33.43
