= Asian Games =

Asian multi-sport event

- 1951; 1954; 1958; 1962; 1966; 1970; 1974; 1978; 1982; 1986; 1990; 1994; 1998; 2002; 2006; 2010; 2014; 2018; 2022; 2026
- Aquatics; Archery; Athletics; Badminton; Baseball; Board games; Bodybuilding; Bowling; Boxing; Canoeing; Cricket; Cue sports; Cycling; Dancesport; Dragon boat; Equestrian; Esports; Fencing; Field hockey; Football; Golf; Gymnastics; Handball; Jet ski; Judo; Ju-jitsu; Kabaddi; Karate; Kurash; Martial arts; Modern pentathlon; Paragliding; Roller sports; Rowing; Rugby union; Sailing; Sepak takraw; Shooting; Sport climbing; Squash; Table tennis; Taekwondo; Tennis; Triathlon; Volleyball; Weightlifting; Wrestling; Wushu
- Olympic Council of Asia; NOCs

Asian Games
- Abbreviation: Asiad
- Motto: Ever Onward
- Purpose: Multi-sport event for nations in Asia
- Frequency: Every four years
- Inaugurated: 1951 Asian Games, New Delhi, India
- Most recent: 2026 Asian Games, Aichi Prefecture and Nagoya, Japan
- Next event: 2030 Asian Games, Doha, Qatar
- President: Joaan bin Hamad Al Thani
- Headquarters: Kuwait City, Kuwait
- Website: oca.asia

The Asian Games, also known as Asiad, is a continental multi-sport event held every four years for athletes of Asia. The Games were regulated by Asian Games Federation from the first Games in New Delhi, India in 1951, until the 1978 Games. Since the 1982 Games, they have been organized by the Olympic Council of Asia, after the breakup of the Asian Games Federation. The Games are recognized by the International Olympic Committee and are the second largest multi-sport event after the Olympic Games.

Nine nations have hosted the Asian Games. Forty-six nations have participated in the Games, including Israel, which was excluded from the Games after its last participation in 1974. The twentieth edition is being held in Aichi Prefecture and Nagoya, Japan, from 19 September to 4 October 2026.

Since 2010, it has been common for the host of the Asian Games to host the Asian Para Games held shortly after the end of the Games. This event is exclusive to athletes with disabilities, just like Paralympic Games. But unlike the Paralympics where the host city's contract mentions the holding of both events, the case of Asia does not mention the mandatory holding of both. Instead, the exclusion of the Asian Paralympic Games from the Asian Games host city's contract means that both events run independently from one other, and may lead to occasions in the future when the two events are held in different cities and countries.

== History ==
=== Origins ===
The Far Eastern Championship Games existed previous to the Asian Games, the former mooted in 1912 for a location set between Japan, the Philippines, and China. The inaugural Far Eastern Games were held in Manila in 1913 with 6 participating nations. There were ten Far Eastern Games held by 1934. The second Sino-Japanese War in 1934, and Japan's insistence on including the Manchu Empire as a competitor nation in the Games, caused China to announce its withdrawal from participation. The Far Eastern Games scheduled for 1938 were cancelled. The organization was eventually discontinued.

=== Formation ===
After World War II, several areas in Asia became sovereign states. Many of these countries sought to exhibit Asian prowess without violence. During the 1948 Summer Olympics in London, a conversation started between China and the Philippines to restore the idea of the Far Eastern Games, following the decolonisation of Asia after World War II. Guru Dutt Sondhi, the Indian International Olympic Committee representative, believed that the restoration of the Far Eastern Games would sufficiently display the spirit of unity and level of achievement taking place in Asian sports. He proposed the idea of a new competition – which came to be the Asian Games. The Asian Athletic Federation would eventually be formed. A preparatory committee was set up to draft the charter for this new body. On 13 February 1949, the Asian Athletic Federation was formally inaugurated in New Delhi, announced as the inaugural host city to be held in 1950.

=== Years of crises ===
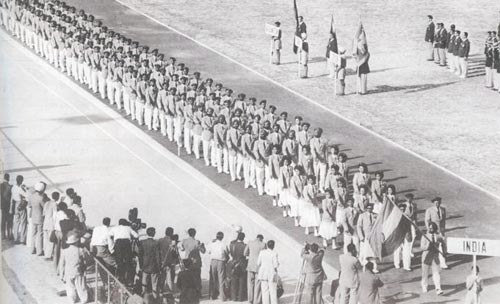
The first Asian Games opening ceremony

In 1962, the Games were hit by several crises. The host country, Indonesia refused to permit Israel and Taiwan to participate due to political recognition issues. The IOC terminated its sponsorship of the Games and terminated Indonesia's membership in the IOC. The Asian Football Confederation (AFC), International Amateur Athletics Federation (IAAF), and the International Weightlifting Federation (IWF) also removed their recognition of the Games.

Seoul renounced its plan to host the 1970 Asian Games on the grounds of a national security crisis; the main reason was due to a financial crisis. The previous host, Thailand, would host the Games in Bangkok using funds transferred from South Korea. Japan was asked to host but declined the opportunity as they were already committed to Expo '70 in Osaka. This edition marked the Games' inaugural television broadcasting, worldwide. In Tehran, in 1974, the Games formally recognized the participation of China, North Korea, and Mongolia. Israel was allowed to participate despite the opposition from the Arab world, while Taiwan was permitted to continue taking part (as "Chinese Taipei") although its status was abolished in a general meeting on 16 November 1973 by the Games Federation.

Before the 1978 Games, Pakistan retracted its plan to host the 1978 Games due to a financial crisis and political issues. Thailand offered to host and the Games were held in Bangkok. As in 1962, Taiwan and Israel refused participation by the Games Federation, amid political issues and security fears. Several governing bodies protested the ban. The International Olympic Committee threatened to bar the participating athletes from the 1980 Summer Olympics. Several nations withdrew before the Games opening.

=== Reorganization and expansion ===
These events led the National Olympic Committees in Asia to revise the constitution of the Asian Games Federation. The Olympic Council of Asia was created in November 1981, excluding Israel and Taiwan. India was scheduled to host in 1982 and the OCA decided to maintain the old AGF timetable. The OCA formally started to supervise the Games starting with the 1986 Asian Games scheduled for Seoul, South Korea. In the 1990 Asian Games held in Beijing, Taiwan (Republic of China) was re-admitted, under pressure by the People's Republic of China to compete as Chinese Taipei.

The 1994 Games held in Hiroshima included the inaugural participation of the former 5 republics of the Soviet Union who were part of Central Asia: Kazakhstan, Kyrgyzstan, Tajikistan, Turkmenistan, and Uzbekistan. It was also the first edition of the Games held in a host country outside its capital city. However, Iraq was suspended from the Games due to the 1990 Persian Gulf War. North Korea boycotted the Games due to political issues with the host country. The Games were hampered during the opening ceremony due to a heart attack that killed Nareshkumar Adhikari, the chief of the Nepalese delegation.

The 1998 Games marked the fourth time the Games were held in Bangkok, Thailand. This time the city participated in a bidding process. The opening ceremony was on 6 December; the previous three were on 9 December. King Bhumibol Adulyadej opened the Games; the closing ceremony was on 20 December (the same date as all the previous games hosted by Thailand).

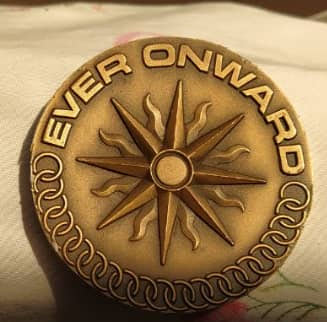
1974 Asian Games medal

== Background ==
=== Symbols ===
The Asian Games Movement uses symbols to represent the ideals embodied in the Asian Games charter. The Asian Games motto is "Ever Onward" which was designed and proposed by Guru Dutt Sondhi upon the creation of the Asian Games Federation in 1949. The Asian Games symbol is a bright sun in red with 16 rays and a white circle in the middle of its disc which represents the ever glimmering and warm spirit of the Asian people.

=== Mascots ===
Since the 1982 Asian Games in New Delhi, India, the Asian Games have had a mascot, usually an animal native to the area or occasionally human figures representing the cultural heritage.

=== Participation ===
All 45 members affiliated with the Olympic Council of Asia (OCA) are eligible to participate in the Games.

According to membership in the OCA, transcontinental Kazakhstan is an Asian country and could participate in the Asian Games, but this right could not apply to Egypt as the country had 6% of the territory on Sinai, participating in the African Games instead. Turkey and Russia/Soviet Union — whose major geographical parts are located in the Asian continent — participate in the European Games rather than the Asian Games. Similarly, Azerbaijan, Georgia, Cyprus, and Armenia are mostly located in Asia but participate in the European Games instead of the Asian Games.

In history, 46 National Olympic Committees (NOCs) have sent competitors to the Games. Israel has been excluded from the Games since 1976, the reason cited as being due to security reasons. Israel requested to participate in the 1982 Games, but the request was rejected by the organizers due to the Munich massacre. Israel is now a member of the European Olympic Committees (EOC) since 1994 and competes at the European Games.

Taiwan, Palestine, Hong Kong, and Macau participate in the Asian Games according to membership in OCA. Due to its continuing ambiguous political status, Taiwan has participated in the Games under the flag of Chinese Taipei since 1990. Macau since 1990 has been allowed to compete as one of the NOCs in the Asian Games, despite not being recognized by the International Olympic Committee (IOC) for participation in the Olympic Games.

In 2007, the President of OCA, Sheikh Ahmed Al-Fahad Al-Ahmed Al-Sabah, rejected the proposal to allow Australia to participate in the Games. He stated that while Australia would add good value to the Asian Games, it would be unfair to the Oceania National Olympic Committees (ONOC). Being members of ONOC, Australia and New Zealand have participated in the Pacific Games since 2015. This motion was mooted again in 2017 after Australia participated in the 2017 Asian Winter Games as they are in discussions to become a full Asian Games member shortly. However, the Australian Olympic Committee announced that Australia would be allowed a small contingent of athletes for the 2022 Games, as long as the qualification for Summer Olympics events such as basketball and volleyball are through the Asia-Pacific region. In November 2021, it was announced that athletes from Oceania would be invited to compete in athletics, triathlon, roller skating, weightlifting, and wushu. Athletes were to receive "honorary medals" which would not be counted on the official medal tally. The plan was shelved due to a lack of interest from the relevant federations in Australia and New Zealand.

There are only seven countries, namely India, Indonesia, Japan, the Philippines, Sri Lanka, Singapore, and Thailand, that have competed in all editions of the games.

== Editions ==
Host cities of the Asian Games

Edition	Year	Host	Games dates / Opened by (Note: Names & offices in italics reflect an opener who was not head of state when opening the Games. If the office is partially italicized, the non-italicized portion is the office & name of the head of state being represented.)	Countries	Competitors	Sports	Events	Top-ranked team	Ref.
1	1951	(India) New Delhi	4–11 March 1951; President Rajendra Prasad	11	489	6	57	Japan (JPN)	
2	1954	(Philippines) Manila	1–9 May 1954; President Ramon Magsaysay	18	970	8	76	Japan (JPN)	
3	1958	(Japan) Tokyo	24 May – 1 June 1958; Emperor Hirohito	16	1,820	13	97	Japan (JPN)	
4	1962	(Indonesia) Jakarta	24 August – 4 September 1962; President Soekarno	12	1,460	13	88	Japan (JPN)	
5	1966	(Thailand) Bangkok	9–20 December 1966; King Bhumibol Adulyadej	16	1,945	14	143	Japan (JPN)	
6	1970	(Thailand) Bangkok	9–20 December 1970; King Bhumibol Adulyadej	18	2,400	13	135	Japan (JPN)	
7	1974	(Iran) Tehran	1–16 September 1974; Shah Mohammad Reza Pahlavi	19	3,010	16	202	Japan (JPN)	
8	1978	(Thailand) Bangkok	9–20 December 1978; King Bhumibol Adulyadej	19	3,842	19	201	Japan (JPN)	
9	1982	(India) New Delhi	19 November – 4 December 1982; President Zail Singh	23	3,411	21	147	China (CHN)	
10	1986	(South Korea) Seoul	20 September – 2 October 1986; President Chun Doo-hwan	22	4,839	25	270	China (CHN)	
11	1990	(China) Beijing	22 September – 7 October 1990; President Yang Shangkun	31	6,122	27	310	China (CHN)	
12	1994	(Japan) Hiroshima	2–16 October 1994; Emperor Akihito	42	6,828	34	338	China (CHN)	
13	1998	(Thailand) Bangkok	6–20 December 1998; King Bhumibol Adulyadej	41	6,554	36	377	China (CHN)	
14	2002	(South Korea) Busan	29 September – 14 October 2002; President Kim Dae-jung	44	7,711	38	419	China (CHN)	
15	2006	(Qatar) Doha	1–15 December 2006; Emir Hamad bin Khalifa Al Thani	45	9,520	39	424	China (CHN)	
16	2010	(China) Guangzhou	12–27 November 2010; Premier Wen Jiabao (Note: Representing Hu Jintao, President of the People's Republic of China.)	45	9,704	42	476	China (CHN)	
17	2014	(South Korea) Incheon	19 September – 4 October 2014; President Park Geun-hye	45	9,501	37	439	China (CHN)	
18	2018	(Indonesia) Jakarta and Palembang	18 August – 2 September 2018; President Joko Widodo	45	11,300	46	465	China (CHN)	
19	2023	(China) Hangzhou	23 September – 8 October 2023 (Note: Originally scheduled for 10–25 September 2022, the Games were postponed by one year due to the COVID-19 pandemic.); President Xi Jinping	45	11,935	40	481	China (CHN)	
20	2026	(Japan) Aichi and Nagoya	19 September – 4 October 2026; Emperor Naruhito	46	10,787	43	469	China (CHN)	
21	2030	(Qatar) Doha	4–19 November 2030	Future event					
22	2034	(Saudi Arabia) Riyadh	29 November – 14 December 2034	Future event					

- 1970 : Seoul, South Korea, had been selected to host the 6th Games but it declined due to both financial reasons and security threats from neighboring North Korea.
- 1978 : Originally, the host city was Singapore but Singapore dropped its plan to host the Games due to financial problems. Then Islamabad, the capital of Pakistan, was decided to host the 8th Games. But Islamabad also dropped its plan to host the Asian Games due to conflicts with Bangladesh and India.
- 2018 : The Games were originally awarded to Hanoi, Vietnam, but withdrew in 2014 due to budgetary concerns and other factors.

== Participating nations ==
45 nations whose NOCs are recognized by the OCA compete at the Asian Games.

- Afghanistan
- Bangladesh
- Bhutan
- Bahrain
- Brunei
- Cambodia
- China
- Chinese Taipei
- Timor-Leste
- Hong Kong
- Indonesia
- India
- Iran
- Iraq
- Jordan
- Japan
- Kazakhstan
- Kuwait
- Kyrgyzstan
- Laos
- Lebanon
- Macau
- Malaysia
- Maldives
- Mongolia
- Myanmar
- Nepal
- North Korea
- Oman
- Pakistan
- Palestine
- Philippines
- Qatar
- Saudi Arabia
- Singapore
- South Korea
- Sri Lanka
- (Syrian opposition) Syria
- Thailand
- Tajikistan
- Turkmenistan
- United Arab Emirates
- Uzbekistan
- Vietnam
- Yemen

== List of sports ==
The historical average for the edition of events by the edition of the Asian Games is nearly 260 events with nearly 24 sports by edition. The last edition held in Hangzhou, China was the edition with the largest number of events when 481 finals in 40 sports were held. Until the 2018 edition, each host country was allowed to set up the program respecting their local demands, which led to a dizzying growth of the event. However, this flexibility rule ruled out the entry of some Olympic sports such as the modern pentathlon and triathlon of the programs of some editions between 1986 and 2006. This flexibility also increased the number of athletes participating in each edition. However, it forced the event to be massive, as there was no calculation of athlete quotas per NOC. To avoid gigantism, OCA established a new policy to be applied starting the 2018 Asian Games, which limited the number of sports to be played at the Games to 40. This new rule is inspired by the Olympic program for the subsequent edition of the Summer Olympic Games and if there is any prior change, the entity will necessarily follow it. However, each region that makes up the body can nominate a regional sport according to its demands. Between one and two extra sports could also be included by organizing committees due to local demands.

Key: = Discontinued

Sport	Years
Aquatics	All
Archery	Since 1978
Athletics	All
Badminton	Since 1962
Baseball	Since 1994
Basketball	All
Board games	2006–2010, 2022
Bodybuilding	2002–2006
Bowling	1978, 1986, 1994–2018
Boxing	Since 1954
Canoeing	Since 1986
Cricket	2010–2014, since 2022
Cue sports	1998–2010
Cycling	1951, since 1958
Dancesport	2010, since 2022
Dragon boat	2010, 2018–2022
Equestrian	1982–1986, since 1994
Esports	Since 2022
Fencing	1974–1978, since 1986
Field hockey	Since 1958
Football	All
Golf	Since 1982
Gymnastics	Since 1974
Handball	Since 1982
Jet ski	2018
Judo	Since 1986
Ju-jitsu	Since 2018

Sport	Years
Kabaddi	Since 1990
Karate	Since 1994
Kurash	Since 2018
Mixed martial arts	2026
Modern pentathlon	1994, 2002, since 2010
Padel	2026
Paragliding	2018
Pencak silat	2018
Roller sports	2010, since 2018
Rowing	Since 1982
Rugby	Since 1998
Sailing	1970, since 1978
Sambo	2018
Sepak takraw	Since 1990
Shooting	Since 1954
Sport climbing	Since 2018
Squash	Since 1998
Surfing	2026
Table tennis	1958–1966, since 1974
Taekwondo	1986, since 1994
Tennis	1958–1966, since 1974
Teqball	2026
Triathlon	Since 2006
Volleyball	Since 1958
Weightlifting	1951–1958, since 1966
Wrestling	Since 1954
Wushu	Since 1990

=== Disciplines ===
Sport	Disciplines	Years
Aquatics	Artistic Swimming	Since 1994
Aquatics	Diving	All
Aquatics	Marathon swimming	2022
Aquatics	Swimming	All
Aquatics	Water polo	All
Baseball	Baseball	Since 1994
Baseball	Softball	Since 1990
Basketball	Basketball	All
Basketball	3x3 basketball	Since 2018
Board games	Chess	2006–2010, 2022
Board games	Contract bridge	2018–2022
Board games	Go	2010, 2022
Board games	Xiangqi	2010, 2022
Canoeing	Slalom canoeing	Since 2010
Canoeing	Sprint canoeing	Since 1990
Cycling	BMX racing	Since 2010
Cycling	BMX freestyle	2026
Cycling	Mountain biking	1998–2002, since 2010
Cycling	Road cycling	1951, since 1958
Cycling	Track cycling	1951, 1958, since 1966
Dancesport	Ballroom	2010
Dancesport	Breaking	Since 2022
Gymnastics	Artistic gymnastics	Since 1974
Gymnastics	Rhythmic gymnastics	Since 1994
Gymnastics	Trampoline	Since 2006
Roller sports	Artistic roller skating	2010, 2022
Roller sports	Inline freestyle skating	2022
Roller sports	Roller speed skating	2010, 2018–2022
Roller sports	Skateboarding	Since 2018
Rugby	Rugby union	1998–2002
Rugby	Rugby sevens	Since 1998
Tennis	Tennis	1958–1966, since 1974
Tennis	Soft tennis	Since 1994
Volleyball	Volleyball	Since 1958
Volleyball	Nine-a-side volleyball	1958–1962
Volleyball	Beach volleyball	Since 1998

== Medal table ==
Of the 46 National Olympic Committees participating throughout the history of the Games, 43 have won at least a single medal in the competition, leaving three National Olympic Committees without a medal: Bhutan, Maldives, and Timor-Leste. 38 National Olympic Committees have won at least one gold medal (only Japan and India have done so at every Asian Games), while China and Japan are the only two NOCs to emerge as the top-ranked team in the medal tables.

In the 2022 Games, India became the fourth nation in history after Japan, China, and South Korea to cross the 100-medal mark in one edition. China, together with Japan and South Korea became the first three countries to cross the overall 200-medal mark in one edition during the 1986 Asian Games. At the 2022 Games, China became the first NOC to surpass the threshold of 100 gold medals, 200 gold medals, 300 overall medals and 400 overall medals in a single edition.

Rank	Nation	Gold	Silver	Bronze	Total
1	China	1,843	1,194	874	3,911
2	Japan	1,167	1,199	1,145	3,511
3	South Korea	826	765	984	2,575
4	Iran	211	220	232	663
5	India	204	266	394	864
6	Kazakhstan	177	204	340	721
7	Thailand	162	202	332	696
8	North Korea	128	174	197	499
9	Uzbekistan	126	163	195	484
10	Chinese Taipei	123	181	337	641
Totals (10 entries)		4,967	4,568	5,030	14,565

== MVP table ==
The Most Valuable Player or MVP award was introduced in the 1998 Games in Bangkok, Thailand. The award was originally awarded to one individual. During the 2022 edition in Hangzhou, the Games started awarding to one male and one female athlete separately.

Year	Athlete		Sport	Ref
Year	Male	Female	Sport	Ref
1998	(Japan) Koji Ito	—N/a	Athletics	
2002	(Japan) Kosuke Kitajima	—N/a	Swimming	
2006	(South Korea) Park Tae-hwan	—N/a	Swimming	
2010	(China) Lin Dan	—N/a	Badminton	
2014	(Japan) Kosuke Hagino	—N/a	Swimming	
2018	—N/a	(Japan) Rikako Ikee	Swimming	
2022	(China) Qin Haiyang	(China) Zhang Yufei	Swimming	
2026	(Thailand) Puripol Boonson	(China) Yu Zidi	Athletics; Swimming	

== Centennial Festival ==
On 8 November 2012, the OCA decided at its 31st General Assembly in Macau to create a special multi-sport event called the Asian Games Centennial Festival in celebration of the 100th anniversary of the Oriental Games, now known as the Far Eastern Championship Games. OCA awarded the Philippines the hosting rights as it was also the host 100 years previous. The event was originally scheduled to be held in Boracay, Malay, Aklan from 27 to 29 November 2013 but due to the events surrounding Typhoon Haiyan, it was moved to January 2014.

== See also ==
- Asian Para Games
- Asian Beach Games
- Asian Winter Games
- Asian Indoor and Martial Arts Games
- Asian Youth Games
- South Asian Games
- Southeast Asian Games
- West Asian Games
