= Dancesport at the 2010 Asian Games – Five standard dances =

Five standard dances at the 2010 Asian Games
- Venue: Zengcheng Gymnasium
- Date: 14 November 2010
- Competitors: 16 from 8 nations

Medalists
gold medal	Yang Chao; Tan Yiling	China
silver medal	Jo Sang-hyo; Lee Se-hee	South Korea
bronze medal	Timur Namazbayev; Amanda Batkalova	Kazakhstan

The five standard dances competition at the 2010 Asian Games in Guangzhou was held on 14 November at the Zengcheng Gymnasium. The five standard dances are the Waltz, Tango, Viennese Waltz, Slow Foxtrot and Quickstep.

== Schedule ==
All times are China Standard Time (UTC+08:00)

Date	Time	Event
Sunday, 14 November 2010	16:20	Semifinal
Sunday, 14 November 2010	18:15	Final

== Results ==
=== Semifinal ===
Rank	Team	Dances					Total
Rank	Team	WAL	TAN	VIE	FOX	QUI	Total
1	Yang Chao / Tan Yiling (CHN)	9	9	9	9	9	45
1	Tsuyoshi Nukina / Mariko Shibahara (JPN)	9	9	9	9	9	45
1	Jo Sang-hyo / Lee Se-hee (KOR)	9	9	9	9	9	45
4	Tu Hao-ying / Ku Tung-yu (TPE)	9	9	8	9	8	43
5	Timur Namazbayev / Amanda Batkalova (KAZ)	8	6	9	9	9	41
6	Apichai Promboon / Pakaorn Kuituan (THA)	1	3	1	0	0	5
7	Bernie Tumarong / Miljane Camacho (PHI)	0	0	0	0	1	1
8	Ieong Su Kan / Wong Sut Kuai (MAC)	0	0	0	0	0	0

=== Final ===
Rank	Team	Dances					Total
Rank	Team	WAL	TAN	VIE	FOX	QUI	Total
1st place, gold medalist(s)	Yang Chao / Tan Yiling (CHN)	43.50	43.50	42.64	43.36	43.07	216.07
2nd place, silver medalist(s)	Jo Sang-hyo / Lee Se-hee (KOR)	38.79	39.07	38.14	38.86	38.79	193.64
3rd place, bronze medalist(s)	Timur Namazbayev / Amanda Batkalova (KAZ)	38.07	36.71	37.43	37.21	38.07	187.50
4	Tsuyoshi Nukina / Mariko Shibahara (JPN)	36.43	35.29	36.00	36.86	35.93	180.50
5	Tu Hao-ying / Ku Tung-yu (TPE)	34.43	35.00	33.07	33.64	33.86	170.00
6	Apichai Promboon / Pakaorn Kuituan (THA)	32.36	32.00	32.93	32.00	32.00	161.29
