= Carolina Karam =

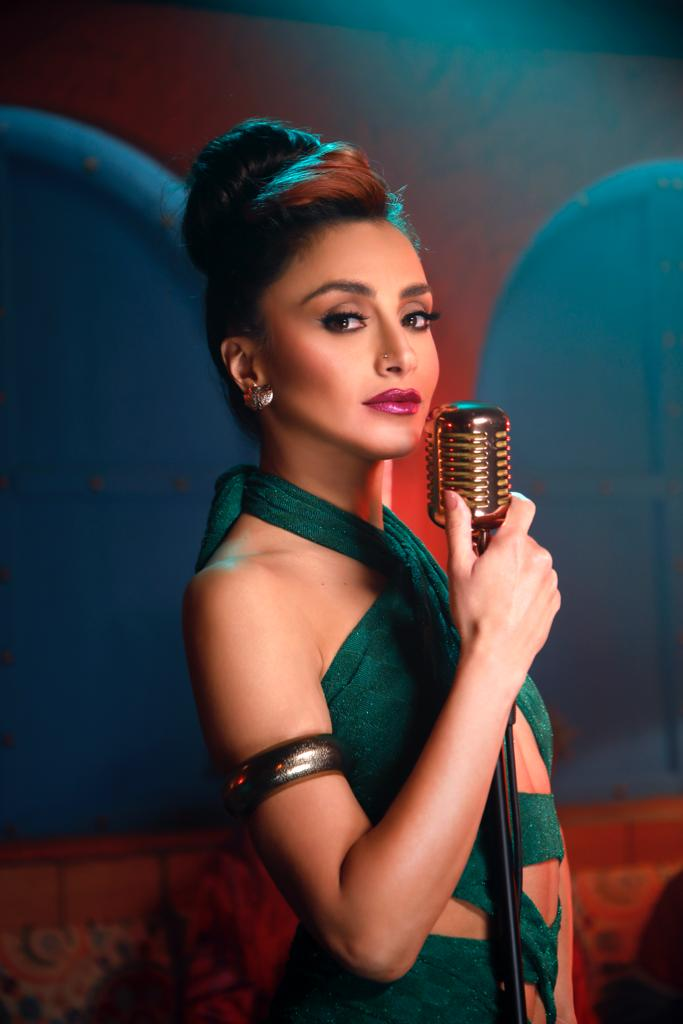
- Born: Caroline Sarah Karam; November 3, 1986 (age 39); Pointe-à-Pitre, France
- Occupations: Singer; dancer
- Agent: Georges Jean
- Website: carolinaksinger.com

Caroline Sarah Karam (Arabic: كارولينا كرم; born November 3, 1986) is a French and Lebanese singer and dancer. She was born in Pointe à Pitre in France. She made her debut after winning the Lebanese Latin Championship in 2011. She performed many live shows in Music Hall in Beirut and participated in the Arabic version of Dancing with the Stars (Arabic: رقص النجوم) for 2 consecutive years with a professional dancer's team.

== Early life and education ==
Carolina Karam was born in Point a Pitre, Guadeloupe, France to French Lebanese Catholic Parents, where she grew up and stayed until the age of 7, before returning to Lebanon. Her passion for music started at a young age influenced by her mother Venus Karam who is a singer and a guitarist mostly singing Christian songs in churches. From 2005 to 2009, Karam studied at Notre Dame University–Louaize, in Lebanon, where she majored in nutrition. She speaks four languages fluently French, Arabic, English, and Spanish.

== Career ==
Karam is a member of the Syndicate of Professional Artists in Lebanon. After winning the Lebanese Latin Championship and the Lebanese Latin Cup in 2011, she represented her country in various dance competitions worldwide. Karam participated in the TV show-Arabic version Dancing with the Stars for 2 consecutive years.

Karam sang in the television program Celebrity Duets, the international charity program, in its Arabic version and the program "Heik Menghanni" alongside Maya Diab and also the program "Ta’a Nensa" with the host Tony Baroud on MTV Lebanon, in addition to her performance at the biggest sporting event world wide_ the FIFA World Cup Qatar 2022.

== Discography ==
- T’en vas pas (August 2014), a French song that was shot in Guadeloupe – France
- Goza la vida (July 2016), a Spanish song
- Saa’a Nattarni/La Espera (January 2017), a Ziad Rahbani song that she performed in Arabic and Spanish
- Natarni/Me Hizo Esperar (July 2017), an Elias Rahbani song that she performed in Arabic and Spanish
- Yalla Tayerni (August 2017)
- 3 Daqat Remix (December 2017)
- Ya Wahechni (August 2018)
- Min Ghayrak (June 2019)
- Shouf (February 2022)
- BAMBI (June 2022)
- Ya Kaddab (May 2024)
- Rageen Ya Eskendereya (August 2025)
- Zaheimer (September 2026)
