= Dancesport at the 2010 Asian Games – Samba =

Samba at the 2010 Asian Games
- Venue: Zengcheng Gymnasium
- Date: 14 November 2010
- Competitors: 20 from 10 nations

Medalists
gold medal	Wang Wei; Chen Jin	China
silver medal	Jang Se-jin; Lee Hae-in	South Korea
bronze medal	Tsuneki Masatani; Megumi Saito	Japan

The Samba competition at the 2010 Asian Games in Guangzhou was held on 14 November at the Zengcheng Gymnasium.

== Schedule ==
All times are China Standard Time (UTC+08:00)

Date	Time	Event
Sunday, 14 November 2010	15:30	Quarterfinal
Sunday, 14 November 2010	16:00	Semifinal
Sunday, 14 November 2010	17:00	Final

== Results ==
=== Quarterfinal ===
Rank	Team	Judges									Total
Rank	Team	A	B	C	D	E	F	G	H	I	Total
1	Wang Wei / Chen Jin (CHN)	1	1	1	1	1	1	1	1	1	9
1	Tsuneki Masatani / Megumi Saito (JPN)	1	1	1	1	1	1	1	1	1	9
3	Jang Se-jin / Lee Hae-in (KOR)	1	1	1	1	0	1	1	1	1	8
3	Yu Yu-chien / Su Tzu-kuan (TPE)	1	1	1	0	1	1	1	1	1	8
5	Aleksei Kibkalo / Viktoriya Kachalko (KGZ)	1	0	1	1	0	1	1	1	1	7
6	John Erolle Melencio / Dearlie Gerodias (PHI)	1	1	1	1	1	0	1	0	0	6
7	Abylaikhan Akkubekov / Veronika Popova (KAZ)	0	0	0	1	1	1	0	1	1	5
8	Kunanon Potisit / Phichittra Leksuma (THA)	0	1	0	0	1	0	0	0	0	2
9	Mher Kandoyan / Carolina Karam (LIB)	0	0	0	0	0	0	0	0	0	0
9	Dickson Zhou / Michelle Loi (MAC)	0	0	0	0	0	0	0	0	0	0

=== Semifinal ===
Rank	Team	Judges									Total
Rank	Team	A	B	C	D	E	F	G	H	I	Total
1	Wang Wei / Chen Jin (CHN)	1	1	1	1	1	1	1	1	1	9
2	Aleksei Kibkalo / Viktoriya Kachalko (KGZ)	0	1	1	1	1	1	1	1	1	8
2	Tsuneki Masatani / Megumi Saito (JPN)	1	1	1	1	1	0	1	1	1	8
2	Jang Se-jin / Lee Hae-in (KOR)	1	1	1	1	0	1	1	1	1	8
5	Abylaikhan Akkubekov / Veronika Popova (KAZ)	1	1	1	0	1	1	0	1	1	7
6	Yu Yu-chien / Su Tzu-kuan (TPE)	0	0	0	1	1	1	0	0	0	3
7	John Erolle Melencio / Dearlie Gerodias (PHI)	1	0	0	0	0	0	1	0	0	2
8	Kunanon Potisit / Phichittra Leksuma (THA)	0	0	0	0	0	0	0	0	0	0

=== Final ===
Rank	Team	Judges									Total
Rank	Team	A	B	C	D	E	F	G	H	I	Total
1st place, gold medalist(s)	Wang Wei / Chen Jin (CHN)	41.00	38.50	38.50	41.50	41.50	41.50	40.50	43.00	39.50	40.71
2nd place, silver medalist(s)	Jang Se-jin / Lee Hae-in (KOR)	36.00	40.50	38.00	40.50	31.50	42.50	38.50	42.00	40.00	39.36
3rd place, bronze medalist(s)	Tsuneki Masatani / Megumi Saito (JPN)	36.00	39.50	38.50	40.00	38.00	35.50	38.00	43.50	39.00	38.50
4	Abylaikhan Akkubekov / Veronika Popova (KAZ)	36.00	37.00	39.00	36.00	34.50	38.00	38.00	38.00	31.50	36.79
5	Aleksei Kibkalo / Viktoriya Kachalko (KGZ)	35.00	36.50	39.00	37.50	32.00	37.50	38.00	38.00	34.00	36.57
6	Yu Yu-chien / Su Tzu-kuan (TPE)	34.50	35.50	37.50	36.50	36.50	38.00	41.50	36.50	33.50	36.43
