= Dancesport at the 2010 Asian Games – Jive =

Jive at the 2010 Asian Games
- Venue: Zengcheng Gymnasium
- Date: 14 November 2010
- Competitors: 20 from 10 nations

Medalists
gold medal	Fan Wenbo; Chen Shiyao	China
silver medal	Kim Do-hyeon; Park Su-myo	South Korea
bronze medal	Yumiya Kubota; Rara Kubota	Japan

The Jive competition at the 2010 Asian Games in Guangzhou was held on 14 November at the Zengcheng Gymnasium.

== Schedule ==
All times are China Standard Time (UTC+08:00)

Date	Time	Event
Sunday, 14 November 2010	15:45	Quarterfinal
Sunday, 14 November 2010	16:15	Semifinal
Sunday, 14 November 2010	17:45	Final

== Results ==
=== Quarterfinal ===
Rank	Team	Judges									Total
Rank	Team	A	B	C	D	E	F	G	H	I	Total
1	Fan Wenbo / Chen Shiyao (CHN)	1	1	1	1	1	1	1	1	1	9
1	Yumiya Kubota / Rara Kubota (JPN)	1	1	1	1	1	1	1	1	1	9
3	Ng Sum Chun / Lam Wai Yi (HKG)	1	0	1	1	1	1	1	1	1	8
3	Theerawut Thommuangpak / Phuthinat Khanitnusorn (THA)	1	1	1	1	1	1	0	1	1	8
5	Kim Do-hyeon / Park Su-myo (KOR)	1	0	0	1	1	1	1	1	1	7
6	Artur Sabitov / Kristina Grigoryan (KAZ)	1	1	1	1	0	0	0	1	0	5
6	Fong Wai Kin / U Mei Kok (MAC)	0	1	0	0	1	1	1	0	1	5
8	John Erolle Melencio / Dearlie Gerodias (PHI)	0	1	1	0	0	0	1	0	0	3
9	Yang Kuang-chen / Ma Li-ann (TPE)	0	0	0	0	0	0	0	0	0	0
9	Phạm Trí Thanh / Bùi Diễm Quỳnh (VIE)	0	0	0	0	0	0	0	0	0	0

=== Semifinal ===
Rank	Team	Judges									Total
Rank	Team	A	B	C	D	E	F	G	H	I	Total
1	Yumiya Kubota / Rara Kubota (JPN)	1	1	1	1	1	1	1	1	1	9
2	Fan Wenbo / Chen Shiyao (CHN)	1	0	1	1	1	1	1	1	1	8
3	Kim Do-hyeon / Park Su-myo (KOR)	1	1	1	1	0	1	0	1	1	7
4	Ng Sum Chun / Lam Wai Yi (HKG)	1	1	1	0	0	1	1	0	0	5
4	Fong Wai Kin / U Mei Kok (MAC)	0	1	0	0	1	1	1	0	1	5
6	Artur Sabitov / Kristina Grigoryan (KAZ)	0	1	0	1	1	0	0	1	0	4
6	Theerawut Thommuangpak / Phuthinat Khanitnusorn (THA)	0	0	0	1	1	0	0	1	1	4
8	John Erolle Melencio / Dearlie Gerodias (PHI)	1	0	1	0	0	0	1	0	0	3

=== Final ===
Rank	Team	Judges									Total
Rank	Team	A	B	C	D	E	F	G	H	I	Total
1st place, gold medalist(s)	Fan Wenbo / Chen Shiyao (CHN)	39.00	39.50	39.50	41.00	42.00	39.00	41.50	42.50	39.50	40.43
2nd place, silver medalist(s)	Kim Do-hyeon / Park Su-myo (KOR)	42.00	38.50	38.00	39.00	40.00	42.50	39.50	40.00	42.00	40.21
3rd place, bronze medalist(s)	Yumiya Kubota / Rara Kubota (JPN)	39.00	38.00	39.00	39.50	39.00	40.50	35.50	39.50	36.00	38.57
4	Artur Sabitov / Kristina Grigoryan (KAZ)	31.50	38.50	36.00	37.00	36.50	37.00	35.00	36.00	34.50	36.00
5	Ng Sum Chun / Lam Wai Yi (HKG)	34.50	36.00	36.00	33.00	38.50	36.50	36.50	35.00	34.00	35.57
6	Theerawut Thommuangpak / Phuthinat Khanitnusorn (THA)	31.00	35.50	31.50	33.50	30.50	36.50	34.00	35.50	34.50	33.64
7	Fong Wai Kin / U Mei Kok (MAC)	31.00	33.00	33.50	34.50	30.00	35.00	35.50	32.50	32.00	33.07
