= Dancesport at the 2010 Asian Games – Five latin dances =

Five latin dances at the 2010 Asian Games
- Venue: Zengcheng Gymnasium
- Date: 13 November 2010
- Competitors: 18 from 9 nations

Medalists
gold medal	Shi Lei; Zhang Baiyu	China
silver medal	Yumiya Kubota; Rara Kubota	Japan
bronze medal	Kim Dae-dong; Yoo Hae-sook	South Korea

The five Latin dances competition at the 2010 Asian Games in Guangzhou was held on 13 November at the Zengcheng Gymnasium. The five Latin dances are the samba, cha-cha-cha, rhumba, pasodoble and jive.

== Schedule ==
All times are China Standard Time (UTC+08:00)

Date	Time	Event
Saturday, 13 November 2010	15:35	Quarterfinal
Saturday, 13 November 2010	16:20	Semifinal
Saturday, 13 November 2010	18:15	Final

== Results ==
=== Quarterfinal ===
Rank	Team	Dances					Total
Rank	Team	SAM	CHA	RUM	PAS	JIV	Total
1	Shi Lei / Zhang Baiyu (CHN)	9	9	9	9	9	45
1	Yumiya Kubota / Rara Kubota (JPN)	9	9	9	9	9	45
3	Akhmet Kalmatayev / Khristina Ivolgina (KAZ)	8	8	9	7	9	41
4	Mihail Kamarda / Valeriya Kachalko (KGZ)	8	5	7	9	3	32
5	Kim Dae-dong / Yoo Hae-sook (KOR)	8	8	9	1	5	31
6	Peng Yen-ming / Chi Hsin-chi (TPE)	6	4	6	4	4	24
7	Brian Lee Calo / Jocelyn Macopia (PHI)	2	3	1	4	8	18
7	Ngô Minh Đức / Cao Thị Vân Diễm (VIE)	2	3	2	6	5	18
9	Lam Chi Tong / Pun Wun (MAC)	2	5	2	5	2	16

=== Semifinal ===
Rank	Team	Dances					Total
Rank	Team	SAM	CHA	RUM	PAS	JIV	Total
1	Shi Lei / Zhang Baiyu (CHN)	9	9	9	9	9	45
2	Kim Dae-dong / Yoo Hae-sook (KOR)	7	8	9	7	9	40
3	Akhmet Kalmatayev / Khristina Ivolgina (KAZ)	9	8	7	9	5	38
4	Yumiya Kubota / Rara Kubota (JPN)	9	9	9	3	6	36
5	Mihail Kamarda / Valeriya Kachalko (KGZ)	5	4	4	9	9	31
6	Peng Yen-ming / Chi Hsin-chi (TPE)	4	3	3	4	2	16
7	Ngô Minh Đức / Cao Thị Vân Diễm (VIE)	1	3	1	3	4	12
8	Brian Lee Calo / Jocelyn Macopia (PHI)	1	1	3	1	1	7

=== Final ===
Rank	Team	Dances					Total
Rank	Team	SAM	CHA	RUM	PAS	JIV	Total
1st place, gold medalist(s)	Shi Lei / Zhang Baiyu (CHN)	43.14	43.21	43.50	43.50	43.57	216.93
2nd place, silver medalist(s)	Yumiya Kubota / Rara Kubota (JPN)	39.14	40.29	39.86	40.71	41.21	201.21
3rd place, bronze medalist(s)	Kim Dae-dong / Yoo Hae-sook (KOR)	38.86	38.93	39.21	38.36	37.86	193.21
4	Akhmet Kalmatayev / Khristina Ivolgina (KAZ)	38.43	38.86	39.07	38.14	38.57	193.07
5	Mihail Kamarda / Valeriya Kachalko (KGZ)	36.07	36.07	36.14	37.07	37.21	182.57
6	Peng Yen-ming / Chi Hsin-chi (TPE)	34.57	34.21	34.50	33.79	34.14	171.21
