= Dancesport at the 2010 Asian Games – Tango =

Tango at the 2010 Asian Games
- Venue: Zengcheng Gymnasium
- Date: 13 November 2010
- Competitors: 18 from 9 nations

Medalists
gold medal	Shen Hong; Liang Yujie	China
silver medal	Nam Sang-wung; Song Yi-na	South Korea
bronze medal	Minato Kojima; Megumi Morita	Japan

The Tango competition at the 2010 Asian Games in Guangzhou was held on 13 November at the Zengcheng Gymnasium.

== Schedule ==
All times are China Standard Time (UTC+08:00)

Date	Time	Event
Saturday, 13 November 2010	15:20	Quarterfinal
Saturday, 13 November 2010	16:05	Semifinal
Saturday, 13 November 2010	17:15	Final

== Results ==
=== Quarterfinal ===
Rank	Team	Judges									Total
Rank	Team	A	B	C	D	E	F	G	H	I	Total
1	Shen Hong / Liang Yujie (CHN)	1	1	1	1	1	1	1	1	1	9
1	Nam Sang-wung / Song Yi-na (KOR)	1	1	1	1	1	1	1	1	1	9
3	Yevgeniy Plokhikh / Yelena Klyuchnikova (KAZ)	1	1	1	1	0	1	1	1	1	8
4	Atis Horthong / Chanikarn Kallayawanich (THA)	1	1	1	0	1	1	1	1	0	7
4	Chao Chun-lun / Kao Chia-lin (TPE)	1	1	0	1	1	1	0	1	1	7
4	Nguyễn Hải Anh / Nguyễn Trọng Nhã Uyên (VIE)	0	1	1	1	1	1	1	0	1	7
7	Minato Kojima / Megumi Morita (JPN)	0	0	1	1	1	0	1	1	1	6
8	Emmanuel Reyes / Maira Rosete (PHI)	1	0	0	0	0	0	0	0	0	1
9	Raed Mourad / Chloe El-Hourani (LIB)	0	0	0	0	0	0	0	0	0	0

=== Semifinal ===
Rank	Team	Judges									Total
Rank	Team	A	B	C	D	E	F	G	H	I	Total
1	Shen Hong / Liang Yujie (CHN)	1	1	1	1	1	1	1	1	1	9
2	Yevgeniy Plokhikh / Yelena Klyuchnikova (KAZ)	1	1	1	1	1	1	0	1	1	8
2	Nam Sang-wung / Song Yi-na (KOR)	1	1	1	1	0	1	1	1	1	8
4	Chao Chun-lun / Kao Chia-lin (TPE)	1	0	1	0	1	1	1	0	1	6
5	Minato Kojima / Megumi Morita (JPN)	0	1	0	0	1	0	1	1	1	5
6	Nguyễn Hải Anh / Nguyễn Trọng Nhã Uyên (VIE)	0	0	1	1	1	0	0	1	0	4
7	Atis Horthong / Chanikarn Kallayawanich (THA)	1	0	0	0	0	1	1	0	0	3
8	Emmanuel Reyes / Maira Rosete (PHI)	0	1	0	1	0	0	0	0	0	2

=== Final ===
Rank	Team	Judges									Total
Rank	Team	A	B	C	D	E	F	G	H	I	Total
1st place, gold medalist(s)	Shen Hong / Liang Yujie (CHN)	40.50	42.00	44.00	42.50	44.50	38.50	42.00	41.50	41.50	42.00
2nd place, silver medalist(s)	Nam Sang-wung / Song Yi-na (KOR)	36.50	36.50	39.00	39.00	40.00	39.00	36.50	33.50	33.50	37.21
3rd place, bronze medalist(s)	Minato Kojima / Megumi Morita (JPN)	34.50	32.00	38.50	38.50	42.00	34.50	38.50	35.00	35.50	36.43
4	Yevgeniy Plokhikh / Yelena Klyuchnikova (KAZ)	36.50	41.00	38.00	37.00	41.50	33.00	34.00	32.00	33.50	36.00
5	Chao Chun-lun / Kao Chia-lin (TPE)	34.50	31.00	37.50	38.50	41.50	36.00	35.00	32.00	37.50	35.86
6	Nguyễn Hải Anh / Nguyễn Trọng Nhã Uyên (VIE)	31.00	33.00	37.00	37.00	42.00	34.00	34.00	33.00	32.50	34.43
