= Dancesport at the 2010 Asian Games – Quickstep =

Quickstep at the 2010 Asian Games
- Venue: Zengcheng Gymnasium
- Date: 13 November 2010
- Competitors: 16 from 8 nations

Medalists
gold medal	Yang Chao; Tan Yiling	China
silver medal	Masayuki Ishihara; Ayami Kubo	Japan
bronze medal	Lee Sang-min; Kim Hye-in	South Korea

The Quickstep competition at the 2010 Asian Games in Guangzhou was held on 13 November at the Zengcheng Gymnasium.

== Schedule ==
All times are China Standard Time (UTC+08:00)

Date	Time	Event
Saturday, 13 November 2010	15:30	Quarterfinal
Saturday, 13 November 2010	16:15	Semifinal
Saturday, 13 November 2010	17:45	Final

== Results ==
=== Quarterfinal ===
Rank	Team	Judges									Total
Rank	Team	A	B	C	D	E	F	G	H	I	Total
1	Yang Chao / Tan Yiling (CHN)	1	1	1	1	1	1	1	1	1	9
1	Masayuki Ishihara / Ayami Kubo (JPN)	1	1	1	1	1	1	1	1	1	9
1	Yevgeniy Plokhikh / Yelena Klyuchnikova (KAZ)	1	1	1	1	1	1	1	1	1	9
1	Lee Sang-min / Kim Hye-in (KOR)	1	1	1	1	1	1	1	1	1	9
1	Tu Hao-ying / Ku Tung-yu (TPE)	1	1	1	1	1	1	1	1	1	9
6	Nguyễn Hải Anh / Nguyễn Trọng Nhã Uyên (VIE)	0	1	1	0	1	1	0	1	1	6
7	Apichai Promboon / Pakaorn Kuituan (THA)	0	0	0	1	0	0	1	0	0	2
8	Joel Madera / Annabelle Madera (PHI)	1	0	0	0	0	0	0	0	0	1

=== Semifinal ===
Rank	Team	Judges									Total
Rank	Team	A	B	C	D	E	F	G	H	I	Total
1	Yang Chao / Tan Yiling (CHN)	1	1	1	1	1	1	1	1	1	9
1	Masayuki Ishihara / Ayami Kubo (JPN)	1	1	1	1	1	1	1	1	1	9
3	Lee Sang-min / Kim Hye-in (KOR)	1	1	1	0	1	1	1	1	1	8
4	Yevgeniy Plokhikh / Yelena Klyuchnikova (KAZ)	1	1	1	1	1	0	0	1	1	7
4	Tu Hao-ying / Ku Tung-yu (TPE)	1	1	1	1	0	1	1	0	1	7
6	Nguyễn Hải Anh / Nguyễn Trọng Nhã Uyên (VIE)	0	0	0	0	1	1	0	1	0	3
7	Apichai Promboon / Pakaorn Kuituan (THA)	0	0	0	1	0	0	1	0	0	2

=== Final ===
Rank	Team	Judges									Total
Rank	Team	A	B	C	D	E	F	G	H	I	Total
1st place, gold medalist(s)	Yang Chao / Tan Yiling (CHN)	42.00	41.50	44.50	45.00	45.00	42.50	41.50	43.00	45.00	43.50
2nd place, silver medalist(s)	Masayuki Ishihara / Ayami Kubo (JPN)	41.50	43.50	44.00	39.50	43.50	42.50	40.00	43.50	40.00	42.21
3rd place, bronze medalist(s)	Lee Sang-min / Kim Hye-in (KOR)	36.50	36.50	39.00	37.50	40.50	41.00	36.50	37.00	36.00	37.71
4	Yevgeniy Plokhikh / Yelena Klyuchnikova (KAZ)	34.00	39.00	37.50	37.00	40.00	34.00	36.00	36.00	35.00	36.36
5	Tu Hao-ying / Ku Tung-yu (TPE)	35.00	33.00	38.50	38.50	38.50	33.50	35.50	34.00	33.00	35.43
6	Nguyễn Hải Anh / Nguyễn Trọng Nhã Uyên (VIE)	30.50	32.00	36.50	36.00	37.50	33.50	35.50	30.50	33.50	33.86
