= Sports and Olympic Committee of Macau, China =

National Olympic Committee

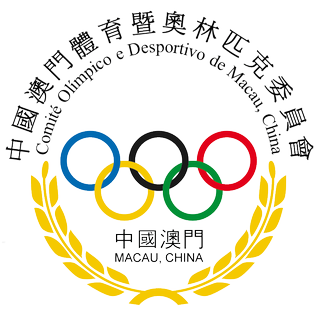
- Country: Macau, China
- Code: MAC
- Created: December 22, 1987
- Continental Association: OCA
- Headquarters: Rua do Desporto, nº 185–195, Taipa, Macau
- President: Lo Keng Siu (盧景昭)
- Secretary General: Chan Chak Mo (陳澤武)
- Website: macauolympic.org

Sports and Olympic Committee of Macau, China

Chinese name
- Traditional Chinese: 中國澳門體育暨奧林匹克委員會
- Simplified Chinese: 中国澳门体育暨奥林匹克委员会
Transcriptions
Standard Mandarin
- Hanyu Pinyin: Zhōngguó Àomén Tǐyù jì Àolínpǐkè Wěiyuánhuì
Yue: Cantonese
- Jyutping: zung1 gwok3 ou3 mun4*2 tai2 juk6 kei3 ou3 lam4 pat1 hak1 wai2 jyun4 wui6*2

Portuguese name
- Portuguese: Comité Olímpico e Desportivo de Macau, China

The Sports and Olympic Committee of Macau, China (MOC, Chinese: 中國澳門體育暨奧林匹克委員會; Portuguese: Comité Olímpico e Desportivo de Macau, China, CODM), is the National Olympic Committee of Macau and is responsible for organizing the region's participation in international sporting events. It is officially recognised as a National Olympic Committee by regional Olympic Committees (including Asian Olympic Committees, Portuguese Speaking Olympic Committees, and East Asian Olympic Committees), but not by the International Olympic Committee.

== History ==
Logo of Macau Olympic Committee (1987–2008)

Although sports in the Portugal-controlled region already had a long history, Macau first began to participate in international tournaments under a separate name following approval to do so by the Olympic Committee of Portugal in 1974. As the region's society became more affluent and more residents were able to attend sporting events, Macau's government established the Macau Sport Development Board (Portuguese: Instituto do Desporto de Macau, ID, Chinese: 澳門體育總署) on May 18, 1987 as a central coordinating office to promote sports in the city. Later that year on December 22, the Macau Olympic Committee (Portuguese: Comité Olímpico de Macau (COM), Chinese: 澳門奧林匹克委員會) was established as the National Olympic Committee for Macau using the flag of the Municipality of Macau. It applied for membership in the Olympic Council of Asia (OCA) in December 1989 during the Council's General Assembly in Bali, Indonesia and was accepted.

The first athlete from Macau to win a medal under the auspices of Macau's NOC in an international tournament was Li Man Yam (Chinese: 李文欽) when he won the bronze medal in tai chi during the 2nd Asian Wushu Championships in Hong Kong in 1989. Wong Tung Ieong (Chinese: 黃東陽) won the first medal in a large-scale tournament by taking bronze in the nanquan event which took part of wushu's inclusion at the 1990 Asian Games, In October 1994, Macau's government established the Awards Committee for Premier Sporting Competitions (Portuguese: Regulamento dos Prémios do Desporto de Alta Competição, Chinese: 高度競爭體育獎勵規章) which grants prizes and awards for distinguished achievement in competitive sports for athletes and coaches from Macau. Also, from 1991 to 1999 the Macau Olympic Committee and the region's government built 20 different sport venues and facilities, including the multi-purpose Macau Stadium, which are administered by a related local sports organization.

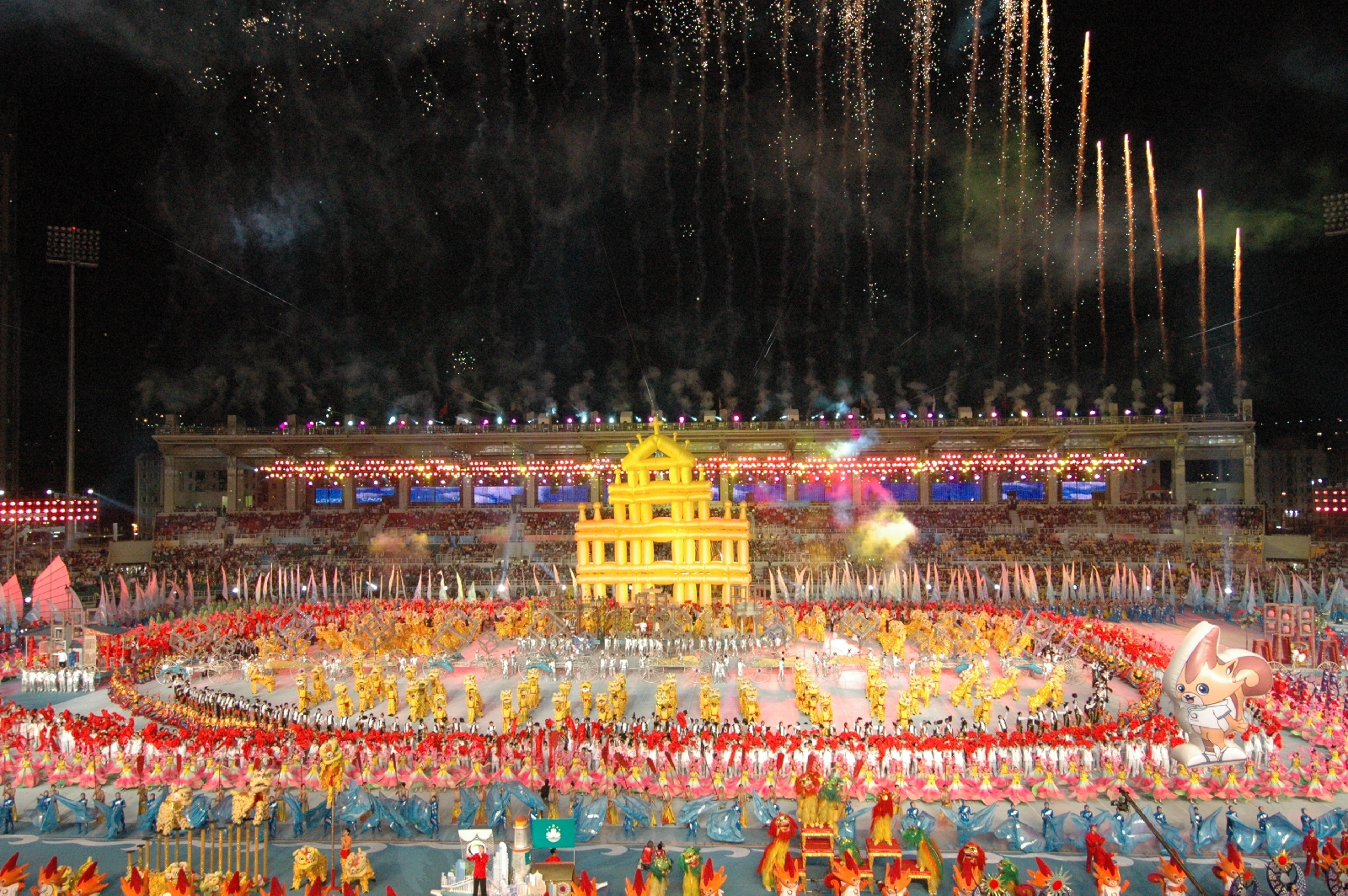
Macau Olympic Committee hosted the East Asian Games in 2005

Although the sovereignty of Macau was handed over from Portugal to the People's Republic of China in 1999, the new government has continued to allow Macau to participate in international organisations and sporting events under the name "Macau, China" using the regional flag of the Macau Special Administrative Region. In addition, the Macau Olympic Committee has participated in the National Games of China since 2011. Macau was elected as the host city of 2005 East Asian Games during the 11th General Assembly of East Asian Games Association in Guam in March 1996. The Games are the largest international sporting event ever hosted by Macau and the SAR achieved the best results of all the countries that participated.

Additionally, during the 22nd General Assembly of Olympic Council of Asia in Kuwait on January 24, 2003, Macau was approved as the host city of 2007 Asian Indoor Games. After the establishment of Association of the Portuguese Speaking Olympic Committees (ACOLOP) on June 8, 2005, Macau was chosen as the host city of the 2006 Lusofonia Games. Macau was also chosen as the first vice-president (2005–2009) and President of the Executive Committee (2009–2013) of ACOLOP. Manuel Silvério (Chinese: 蕭威利), the first vice-president of the Macau Olympic Committee, was elected as the vice president of the Olympic Council of Asia in 2005.

As several athletes in the region had expressed interest in forming an organization to administer non-international sporting events in the regions, the Macau Olympic Committee revised its constitution and renamed itself to Sports and Olympic Committee of Macau, China on September 10, 2008. After the change, CODM remains the only internal and external sports federation for Macau. CODM hosted the 31st General Assembly of Olympic Council of Asia during November 2012 which elected Hanoi, Vietnam as the host city for the 2018 Asian Games.

== Status ==
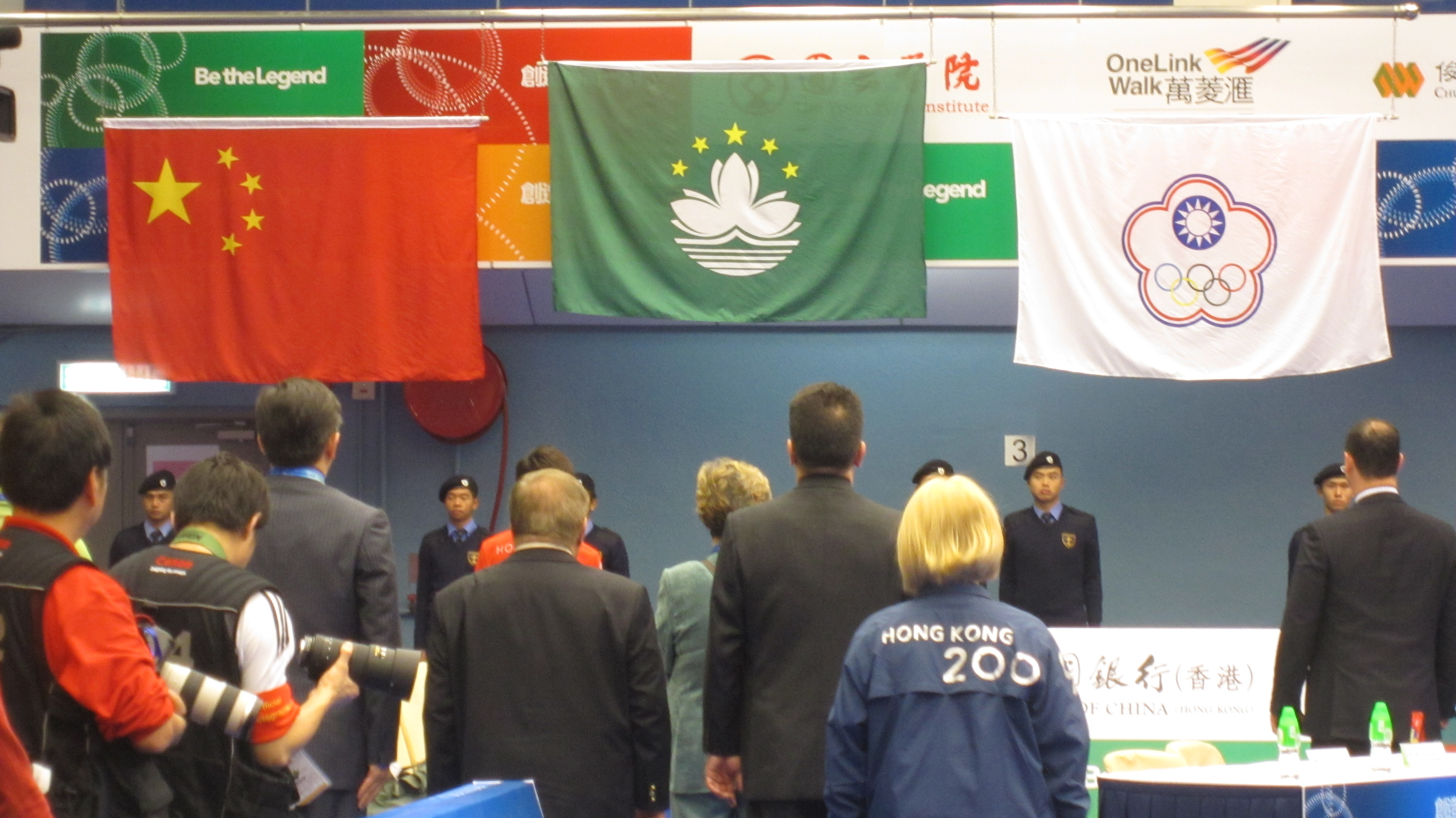
Flag of Macau, China (center) is raised in a Victory Ceremony during 2009 East Asian Games.

As was done previously by the Macau Olympic Committee, the Ministry of Foreign Affairs of the People's Republic of China has sent several letters to the International Olympic Committee to support recognition of Macau as a member of the IOC. This request has been complicated by the fact that the IOC revised its Charter in 1996 to only admit new NOCs that represent independent states recognised by the international community (fellow SAR Hong Kong having been grandfathered in). Despite the setbacks, Manuel Silvério told a reporter for the Macau Daily in 2008 that "the application from the Macau Olympic Committee for membership in the International Olympic Committee under the name 'Macau, China' is in 'considering and hearing' and the Chinese Government and Chinese Olympic Committee are assisting with the application."

As of 2025, the Sports and Olympic Committee of Macau remains unrecognized as a NOC by the International Olympic Committee. However, as Macau is an autonomous territory, it has been allowed to join some international organisations and games such as the Asian Games as a separate entity, but it has not been allowed to do so in games for sovereign states such as the Olympic Games. Additionally, because the National Paralympic Committee of Macau is a member of International Paralympic Committee, para-athletes of Macau are allowed to compete in Paralympics.

== See also ==
- Chinese Olympic Committee
- Sports Federation and Olympic Committee of Hong Kong
- Chinese Taipei Olympic Committee
