= Bids for the Asian Games =

Bids for the Asian Games is the process where National Olympic Committees select from within their national territory cities to put forward bids to host an Asian Games.

== List of Asian Games bids ==
Games	Year	Candidate cities		Non-candidate applicant cities	AGF assembly	Ref
Games	Year	Host city	Others	Non-candidate applicant cities	AGF assembly	Ref
I	1951 details	(India) New Delhi	Only bid		(India) Delhi (1949-02-13)	
II	1954 details	(Philippines) Manila	Only bid		(India) New Delhi (1951)	
III	1958 details	(Japan) Tokyo	Only bid		(Philippines) Manila (1954-05-06)	
IV	1962 details	(Indonesia) Jakarta	(Pakistan) Karachi		(Japan) Tokyo (1958-05-23)	
V	1966 details	(Thailand) Bangkok	Only bid		(Indonesia) Jakarta (1962-08-30)	
VI	1970 details	~~(South Korea) Seoul~~	Only bid	(Dominion of Ceylon) Colombo	(Thailand) Bangkok (1966–12–5)	
VI	1970 details	(Thailand) Bangkok	Only bid		Mexico City (1968-10-14)	
VII	1974 details	(Iran) Tehran	Kuwait City (Israel) Tel Aviv		(Thailand) Bangkok (1968-12-11)	
VIII	1978 details	~~Singapore~~			(West Germany) Munich (1972-08-25)	
VIII	1978 details	~~(Pakistan) Islamabad~~			(Iran) Tehran (1974-08-29)	
VIII	1978 details	(Thailand) Bangkok	(South Korea) Seoul		(Canada) Montreal (1976-07-24)	
IX	1982 details	(India) New Delhi			(Canada) Montreal (1976-07-24)	
X	1986 details	(South Korea) Seoul	only bid	(Iraq) Baghdad (North Korea) Pyongyang	(India) New Delhi (1981-11-26)	
XI	1990 details	(China) Beijing	(Japan) Hiroshima		3rd (South Korea) Seoul (1984)	
XII	1994 details	(Japan) Hiroshima	(China) Beijing		3rd (South Korea) Seoul (1984)	
XIII	1998 details	(Thailand) Bangkok	(Taiwan) Taipei (Indonesia) Jakarta		9th (China) Beijing (1990-09-27)	
XIV	2002 details	(South Korea) Busan	(Taiwan) Kaohsiung		14th (South Korea) Seoul (1995-05-23)	
XV	2006 details	(Qatar) Doha	(Malaysia) Kuala Lumpur; Hong Kong (bid) (India) New Delhi		19th (South Korea) Busan (2000-11-12)	
XVI	2010 details	(China) Guangzhou	Only Bid	(Jordan) Amman (Malaysia) Kuala Lumpur (South Korea) Seoul	23rd (Qatar) Doha (2004-07-01)	
XVII	2014 details	(South Korea) Incheon	(India) New Delhi	(Jordan) Amman (Vietnam) Hanoi	26th Kuwait City (2007-04-17)	
XVIII	2019	~~(Vietnam) Hanoi~~	(Indonesia) Surabaya	(United Arab Emirates) Dubai	31st Macau (2012-11-08)	
XVIII	2018 details	(Indonesia) Jakarta and Palembang	Only Bid		33rd (South Korea) Incheon (2014-09-19)	
XIX	2022 details	(China) Hangzhou	Only Bid		34th (Turkmenistan) Ashgabat (2015-09-16)	
XX	2026 details	(Japan) Aichi (Note: The term refers to other subdivisions of the Aichi Prefecture that will host the event together with Nagoya city.) and Nagoya	Only Bid		35th (Vietnam) Da Nang (2016-09-25)	
XXI	2030 details	(Qatar) Doha	(Saudi Arabia) Riyadh		39th (Oman) Muscat (2020-12-16)	
XXII	2034 details	(Saudi Arabia) Riyadh	(Qatar) Doha		39th (Oman) Muscat (2020-12-16)	

== List of Asian Winter Games bids ==
Games	Year	Candidate cities		Non-candidate applicant cities	OCA assembly	Ref
Games	Year	Host city	Others	Non-candidate applicant cities	OCA assembly	Ref
I	1986 details	(Japan) Sapporo	Only bid		3rd (South Korea) Seoul (1984)	
II	1990 details	~~India~~	Only bid			
II	1990 details	(Japan) Sapporo	Only bid		8th (Indonesia) Bali (1989)	
III	1995	~~(North Korea) Samjiyon~~	Only bid			
III	1996 details	(China) Harbin	(South Korea) Gangwon		12th Kuwait City (1993-12-02)	
IV	1999 details	(South Korea) Gangwon	Only bid		12th Kuwait City (1993-12-02)	
V	2003 details	(Japan) Aomori	Only bid		16th (India) New Delhi (1997-12-14)	
VI	2007 details	(China) Changchun	(Lebanon) Beirut	(Iran) Tehran (Kazakhstan) Almaty	21st (South Korea) Busan (2002-10-02)	
VII	2009	~~(Lebanon) Beirut~~	Only bid		21st (South Korea) Busan (2002-10-02)	
VII	2011 details	(Kazakhstan) Astana and Almaty	Only bid		25th Kuwait City (2006-03-04)	
VIII	2017 details	(Japan) Sapporo and Obihiro	Only bid		30th (Kazakhstan) Astana (2011-01-31)	
IX	2025 details	(China) Harbin	Only bid		42nd (Thailand) Bangkok (2023-07-08)	
X	2029 details	~~(Saudi Arabia) Neom~~	Only bid		41st (Cambodia) Phnom Penh (2022-10-04)	
X	2029 details	(Kazakhstan) Almaty	Only bid		No (Italy) Milan (2026-02-05)	

== List of Asian Youth Games bids ==
Games	Year	Candidate cities		Non-candidate applicant cities	OCA assembly	Ref
Games	Year	Host city	Others	Non-candidate applicant cities	OCA assembly	Ref
I	2009 details	Singapore	Only bid			
II	2013 details	(China) Nanjing	Only bid		29th (China) Guangzhou (2010-11-13)	
III	2017	~~(Sri Lanka) Hambantota~~	Only bid		No; Kuwait City (2012-06-12)	
III	2017	~~(Indonesia) Jakarta~~	Only bid		34th (Turkmenistan) Ashgabat (2015-09-16)	
III	2021 details	~~(Indonesia) Surabaya~~	Only bid		31st Macau (2012-11-08)	
III	2021 details	~~(China) Shantou~~	Only bid		38th (Thailand) Bangkok (2019-03-03)	
III	2025	~~(Uzbekistan) Tashkent~~	Only bid		No (Qatar) Doha (2019-09-28)	
III	2025	Bahrain	Only bid		No (Switzerland) Lausanne (2024-12-26)	
IV	2029	~~(Cambodia) Phnom Penh~~	Only bid		40th (United Arab Emirates) Dubai (2021-11-22)	
IV	2029	(Uzbekistan) Tashkent	Only bid		No (Bahrain) Manama (2025-10-31)	

== List of Asian Esports and Mind Sports Games bids ==
Games	Year	Candidate cities		Non-candidate applicant cities	OCA assembly	Ref
Games	Year	Host city	Others	Non-candidate applicant cities	OCA assembly	Ref
I	2027	Kuwait	Only bid		No (Japan) Nagoya (2026-09-19)	
