= Sport in China (disambiguation) =

Sport in China refers to the exercise of sport activities in the People's Republic of China. It may also refer to:

- Sport in Hong Kong
- Sport in Macau
- Sport in Taiwan (Republic of China)
