= Sport in China =

Sports in the People's Republic of China consists of a variety of competitive sports. Traditional Chinese culture regards physical fitness as an important characteristic. China has its own national quadrennial multi-sport event similar to the Olympic Games called the National Games. In 2018, 21% of people in China called basketball their favorite sport, followed by 17% for association football. In 2022, 22% of people in China said that basketball is their favourite sport, followed by 21% for association football.

Sports in China has long been associated with the martial arts. Before the 1980s, the country's international sports success was mainly in table tennis. This changed with the 1981 FIVB Volleyball Women's World Cup where the Chinese team won the gold medal amid enormous public attention.

Prior to the 1990s, sports were entirely funded by the government. In 1994, Chinese association football was professionalized, followed by basketball, volleyball, ping pong, and weiqi. Professionalization led to commercialization; this meant that sports associations became profit-making entities and that a club system and professional sports leagues were formed. Chinese athletes have also begun joining professional leagues abroad, such as basketball player Yao Ming's entry into the United States' NBA in the 2002 draft.

== History ==
Dragon boat racing dates back about 2000 years ago and remains a traditional event held around China every year. Cuju, a game similar but not related to the modern game of football, was played in China during the 2nd and 3rd centuries BC. Qigong martial arts activities became popular in China.

In the late eighteenth century and the nineteenth century, elites in China generally viewed sports as undignified. Elite culture de-emphasised sport and did not view it as a significant component of personal cultivation.

China began conceptualizing sports as a matter of national concern in the twentieth century. After Japan defeated China in the First Sino-Japanese War, some Chinese thinkers began to associate physical cultivation with the well-being of the nation and envisioned sport as a new area for international activity.

Chinese on the mainland and in Hong Kong both were significant in founding the Far Eastern Athletic Association, which sponsored the Far Eastern Championship Games every two years.

Among the influences in the development of China's emphasis on sport was a 1930 book by Song Ruhai, Olympiad (rendered as wo neng bi ya, which is similar to the pronunciation of "Olympiad" and means literally "I can compete"). Ruhai had worked for the YMCA and China's amateur athletic association. The book helped incorporate the idea that China could compete in sports internationally into Chinese discourse.

During the Mao era of the People's Republic of China (PRC), China's view of international sports competitions focused on the idea of "friendship first, competition second."

During the Cultural Revolution, in 1966, China's national teams stopped training and withdrew from all international events. In 1970, China's national teams began competing again.

During the Deng era, the government increased its emphasis on winning international sporting competitions as part of its idea for a strong and more internationally-engaged in China. The State Sports Commission issued its "Olympic Model" in 1979, instructing each province to channel its sports programs toward the overall goal of winning in the Olympic games. In 1980, it issued the slogan "Break out of Asia, advance on the world" in an effort to spur China's participation in international sports.

In 1984, China participated fully in the Olympic Games in Los Angeles. China won its first gold medal in history (by sharpshooter Xu Haifeng, who was celebrated nationally for the achievement) and won 14 more gold medals in the 1984 Olympics.

Even though Western observers tend to associate China with table tennis, badminton, martial arts, and various forms of pool, traditionally Western sports such as basketball and football are getting more and more popular.

== Main team sports ==
=== Association football ===
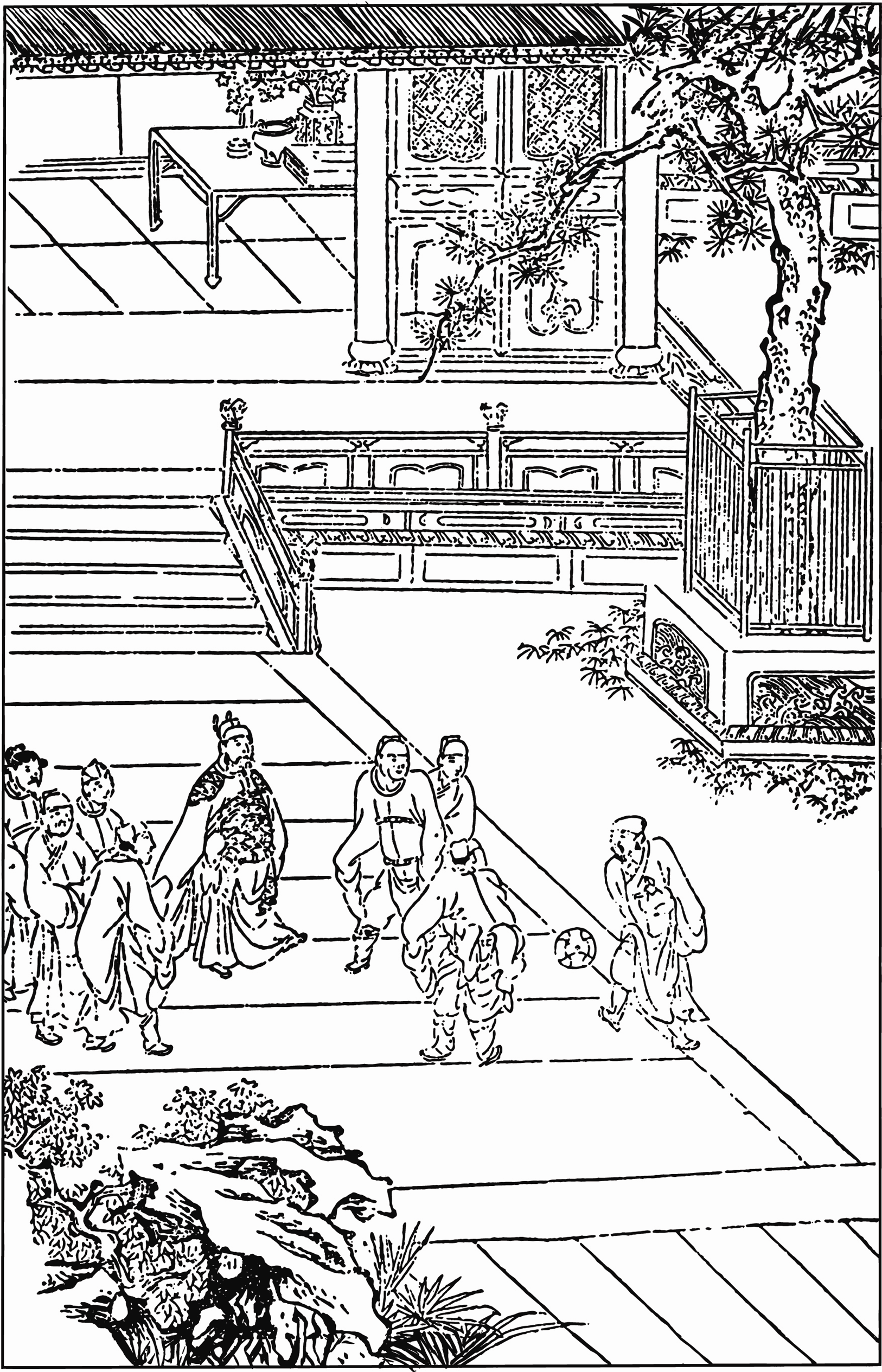
Cuju, an ancient form of football from China

Association football is the best-attended sport in China. The 2024 Chinese Super League saw an average attendance of 19,431, while the Chinese Basketball Association typically draws around 5,000 spectators per game. Football has become the most popular sport in nearly every province of China, with basketball closely following behind. In Chinese-speaking regions, association football is not the number one sport in Taiwan, where baseball takes the top spot, and in Hong Kong, where horse racing is the most popular sport.

There is written evidence that a game similar to football, Cuju, was first played in China around 50 BC. The current Chinese Football Association (CFA) was founded in the PRC after 1949. Its headquarters is located in Beijing, and the current chairman is Chen Xuyuan. From 1994 to 2004, the CFA established the first professional football league, which was "Jia A". The Chinese Super League (CSL) is the premier football league in China, which was changed from "Jia A" in 2004, as the top of a league hierarchy that extends to four leagues. Jia in Chinese also means "First" or "Best". Since its foundation the Super League has been relatively unstable, and has struggled to maintain popularity. In 2016, the average attendance of the CSL was 24,159 making it one of the highest attending professional football league around the world.

At the international level, Chinese football has enjoyed little success despite the amount of support it receives from fans. Although the national team qualified for the 2002 FIFA World Cup, they failed to score a single goal and lost three group matches. Conversely, the women's national team has finished second at both the World Championships and the Olympic Games. Despite the Chinese women's team's success at international competitions, however, women's football in China does not receive nearly as much attention as their counterparts in Canada and the United States, therefore China's good trend in women's football may well come to an end in the near future. In 1991, China hosted the inaugural Women's World Cup in Guangzhou; in 2004, it hosted AFC Asian Cup.

Football has always been among the more popular amateur team sports for recreation in China. High schools often have football facilities, some of which are rented on weekends to local amateur teams to organize matches. It is also popular to watch on television, with large international tournaments such as the World Cup and the European Championships, as well as major European leagues receiving widespread coverage.

=== Basketball ===
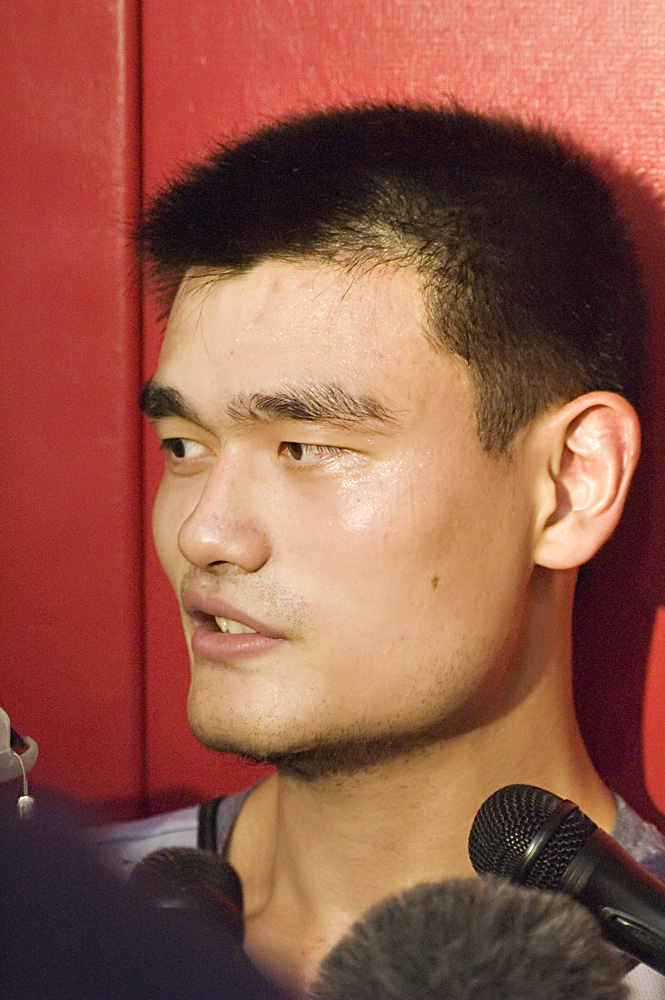
Houston Rockets superstar Yao Ming

In 2018, 21% of Chinese people said that basketball is their favorite sport. China hosted the 2019 FIBA Basketball World Cup.

The game was introduced to China by American YMCA workers in 1896, just five years after Canadian-American James Naismith invented basketball in 1891 while working for the YMCA Training School in Springfield, Massachusetts.

Since Yao Ming's 2002 arrival in the NBA, basketball has become increasingly more popular. According to the Chinese Basketball Association, there is a record number of around 300 million active basketball players in China.

China's first professional team was started in Shenyang and sponsored by the Anshan Steel Company. The CBA was established in 1995, and by 2008 it had expanded to 18 teams.

The fact that the United States is starting to notice Chinese players after Yao Ming's success (compared to Wang Zhizhi and Mengke Bateer), and young CBA players such as Yi Jianlian and Sun Yue entering the NBA are a testament to basketball's increasing popularity.

=== Volleyball ===
Volleyball arrived in Asia in 1908 and was officially introduced to China in 1910. The Chinese Volleyball Association represents China in the Fédération Internationale de Volleyball and the Asian Volleyball Confederation, as well as the representing the volleyball sports in the All-China Sports Federation.

The China women's national volleyball team is one of the leading squads in women's international volleyball, having won the Olympic title three times (1984, 2004 and 2016). China took five consecutive World titles in the 1980s, the FIVB Volleyball Women's World Cup in 1981 and 1985, and the FIVB Volleyball Women's World Championship in 1982 and 1986. Although it experienced unstable development in the 1990s, the team won the 2003 FIVB World Grand Prix, captured the gold medal in the 2004 Summer Olympics, claimed the 2015 FIVB World Cup, and finished second at the 2013 FIVB World Grand Prix and the 2014 FIVB World Championship.

During the 100th Anniversary of the Chinese Communist Party in 2021, the "spirit of the women's volleyball team" was one of the ninety-one motivational examples celebrated as part of "the spiritual genealogy of the Chinese communists."

As of 2026, the women's volleyball team is China's most successful national sports team.

The China men's national volleyball team represents China in international volleyball competitions and friendly matches. The team twice took part in the Summer Olympics, finishing in eighth place at the 1984 Summer Olympics in Los Angeles, California, and 5th place in the 2008 Summer Olympics.

Since 1956, the men's national team has taken part in eleven World Championships, with its best results in Italy (1978) and Argentina (1982), where it finished seventh. The team also placed ninth three times, in France (1956), the Soviet Union (1962), and Czechoslovakia (1966). In 2002 in Argentina, China was 13th as a new rebuilding phase got off the ground. China took part in the opening edition of the top-class Volleyball World League in 1990 and regularly participated between 1992 and 1997, finishing sixth in 1996.

China featured national teams in beach volleyball that competed at the 2018–2020 AVC Beach Volleyball Continental Cup in both the women's and the men's sections.

=== Calendar of the major men's and women's professional sports leagues in China ===
January	February	March	April	May	June	July	August	September	October	November	December
		CSL (Association Football)									
CBA (Basketball)									CBA (Basketball)		
CVL (Men's) (Volleyball)									CVL (Men's) (Volleyball)		

January	February	March	April	May	June	July	August	September	October	November	December
		CWSL (Association Football)									
WCBA (Basketball)									WCBA (Basketball)		
CVL (Women's) (Volleyball)										CVL (Women's) (Volleyball)	

== Other team sports ==
=== Bandy ===
China started a bandy development programme by organising educational days in Ürümqi in June 2009. They did not come as planned to the 2011 Asian Winter Games. However, China national bandy team debuted in the 2015 Bandy World Championship. Harbin hosted Division B of the 2018 tournament.

A picture of the team based in Harbin is available online.

The China women's national bandy team made its World Championship debut in 2016. Chengde hosted the 2018 tournament.

China has announced its intention to participate in both the men's and women's tournament of the 2019 Winter Universiade.

In terms of licensed athletes, it is the second biggest winter sport in the world.

=== Baseball ===
Baseball was first introduced in 1864 with the establishment of the Shanghai Baseball Club by American medical missionary Henry William Boone. Organized baseball games were established with a game between the St. Johns University and the Shanghai MCA baseball club in 1905. However, in 1959 Mao Zedong disbanded all the teams and outlawed baseball.

After the Cultural Revolution ended, baseball activities restarted, and the China Baseball Association formed in 1974. In 2002, the China Baseball League was formed and in 2019 China National Baseball League. China participates in the World Baseball Classic. Defeats of the national team to Taiwan, Japan, and South Korea may help change the trend as Chinese become more aware of the game's internationalization.

=== Curling ===
Although generally unheard of and unpopular, curling has been an improving sport for China to play. The government selected athletic individuals to play curling for China. The Chinese teams both Men and Women have improved at the international level. At the 2008 Ford World Women's Championships, the Chinese curling team consisting of Zhou Yan, Liu Yin, Wang Bingyu, and Yue Qingshuang won a surprising silver medal finish. At the 2008 World Men's Curling Championship, the Chinese didn't have as much success, but they also did very well, finishing 4th. The government is also hoping to promote the sport through Universities and Colleges. In March 2009, China became the first Asian team to win a curling world championship by beating Sweden in the final. At the 2010 Winter Olympic Games the women's team won the bronze medal, defeating Switzerland in 10 ends.

=== Field hockey ===
The China women's national field hockey team won silver at the 2008 Summer Olympics in Beijing, as well as bronze at the 2002 Women's Hockey World Cup. Also, the team won the 2002 Hockey Champions Trophy and finished second in 2004 and 2006.

== Individual sports ==
=== Badminton ===
Badminton is popular in China thanks to its relative simplicity in recreational use and inexpensive equipment. Many Chinese badminton players have gained international success and fame, especially the many Gold medalists at the BWF World Championships. It is a popular recreational, and professional sport, with amateur leagues throughout the country.

=== Boxing ===
Boxing in China first appeared in the 1920s. Professional boxing is followed by some fans in China.

=== Chess ===
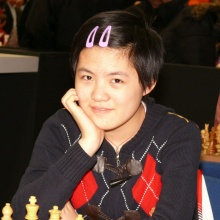
Former Women's World Chess Champion Hou Yifan (2007)

China had a good result in the 2006 37th Chess Olympiad in Turin when the men's team came second behind Armenia and the women's team third for the best result overall. The Chinese progress has been underpinned by large government support and testing competition in numerous tough events. Commensurate with its status, China currently has seven hundred players, second only to Russia. However, even today countries like Russia and Israel still have an edge in experience over their Chinese counterparts.

Xiangqi is also considered a sport in China, with millions of players nationwide. There is a national Chinese chess league.

=== Figure skating ===
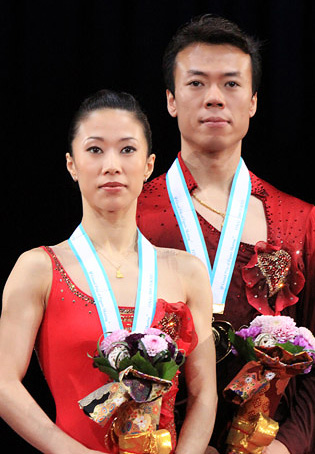
Shen Xue and Zhao Hongbo are considered by many critics of the sport to be one of the best pair skating teams of all time.

Since the 1990s, China has been one of the top nations in the pairs events of figure skating. Shen Xue and Zhao Hongbo were very famous figure skating pair in China that received widespread media coverage during their career; they were three-time world champions and won a gold medal in Vancouver Winter Olympics 2010. Comparatively, China is weak in the other three disciplines (men's singles, ladies' singles, and ice dancing).

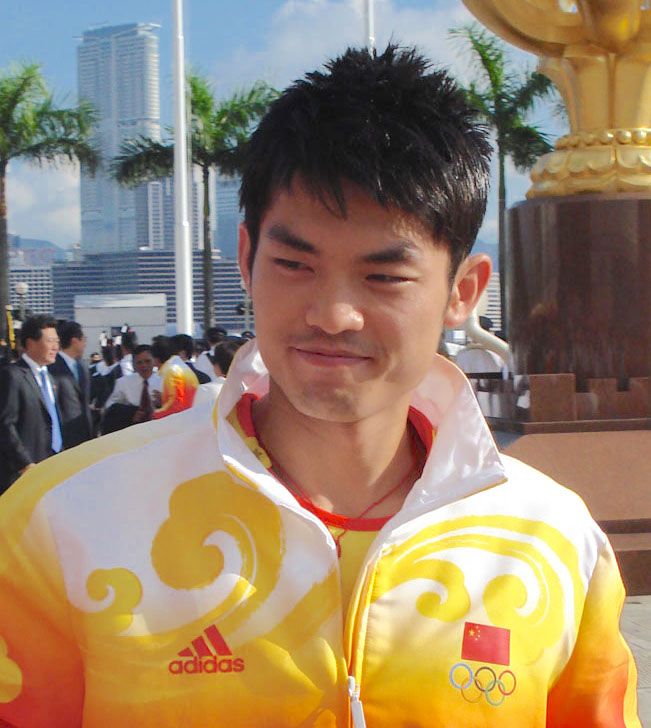
Lin Dan is the only player in badminton history to have won three consecutive titles at the World Championships (2006, 2007 and 2009).

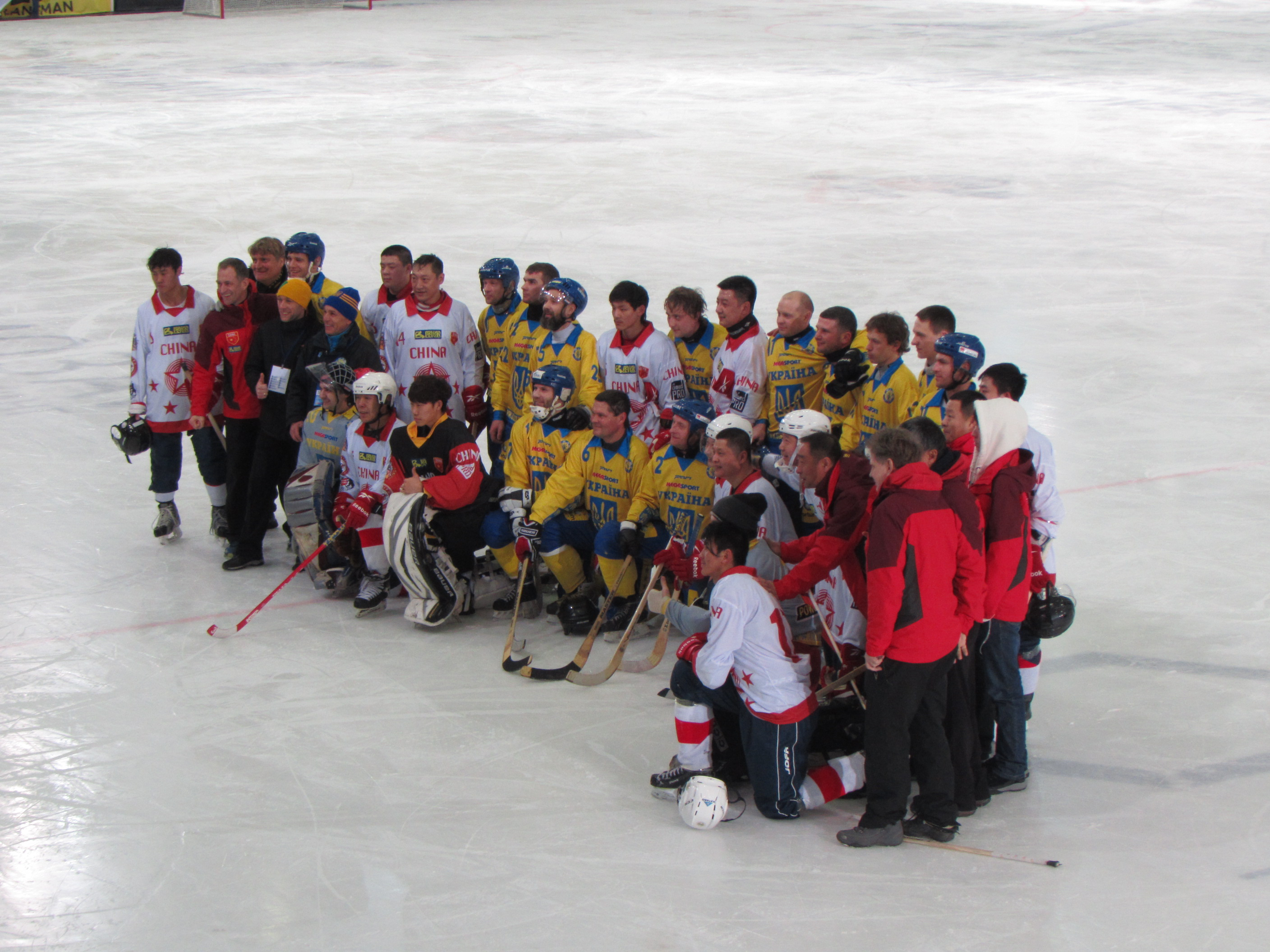
China national bandy team with Ukraine at the 2016 World Championship

=== Golf ===
Golf tournaments in China include the WGC-HSBC Champions in Shanghai, TCL Classic in Sanya on Hainan island, the Volvo China Open and the BMW Asian Open, played in the PRC. The most successful Chinese male golfer has been Zhang Lian-wei. The most successful Chinese female golfer is Feng Shanshan. The Mission Hills Golf Club golf course at Guanlan in Shenzhen is said to be the world's largest.

At the amateur level, golf is seen as the top recreational sport for businesspeople and officials. Because of their relatively high position in Chinese society, they are usually the only people with access to the sport of golf on mainland China. At the 2007 National People's Congress, caving in to the popular acknowledgment that the building of new golf courses is not only a waste of public funds but an illegal use of space, Premier Wen Jiabao said in his Work Report to the Congress that contracts in building new golf courses should be highly discouraged and Communist party officials are banned from playing.

=== Motor racing ===
The Macau Grand Prix is held since 1954, known for its Formula 3, touring car and superbikes races.

The first international motor race in mainland China was the 1994 edition of the 3 Hours of Zhuhai, held at the Zhuhai Street Circuit as a round of the 1994 BPR Global GT Series. The Chinese Grand Prix is a Formula One event that has been held at the Shanghai International Circuit since 2004. The same circuit has hosted the 6 Hours of Shanghai, a round of the FIA World Endurance Championship, since 2012.

Ma Qinghua became the first Chinese driver to win an FIA World Championship race when he won the second of two races at the 2014 FIA WTCC Race of Russia, his debut meeting in the World Touring Car Championship. Ma had previously become the first Chinese driver to drive an F1 car at a Grand Prix meeting when he drove in the first free practice session for the HRT Formula 1 Team at the 2012 Italian Grand Prix.

Zhou Guanyu became the first Chinese Formula One driver after making his debut at the 2022 Bahrain Grand Prix.

=== Snooker ===
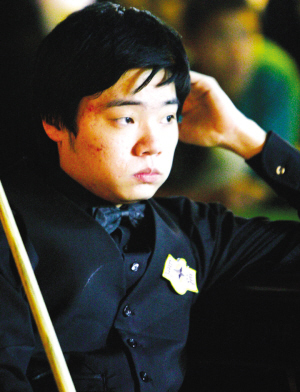
Ding Junhui is the first Chinese snooker player to win a ranking tournament and the Masters.

Although pool or, more specifically, billiards, has long been a popular street recreation sport in China, snooker's popularity has increased over the last few years in China. It can partly be attributed to the ascension of Ding Junhui who was once the number one ranked professional player and reached the final of the 2016 World Snooker Championship. More and more young Chinese players are breaking onto the professional circuit such as Liang Wenbo and Liu Chuang who both qualified for the last 32 of the 2008 World Snooker Championship, with Liang going on to reach the quarterfinals, where he faced a snooker legend Ronnie O'Sullivan. Snooker is played by an estimated 50 million Chinese people, and there are now over 300 snooker clubs in Beijing alone. China hosts several major professional ranking snooker tournaments.

Most recently Zhao Xintong, the current world snooker champion at time of editing (May 1st 2026) has garnered big attention for the sport, beating former world champion Mark Williams 18-12 in the 2025 World Championship Final.

=== Speed skating ===
There are six indoor speed skating arenas (Changchun, Daqing, Harbin, Qiqihar, Shenyang and Ürümqi). Three of the outdoor ovals were opened in 2012 (Fukang, Karamay, and Wangqing).

=== Table tennis (ping pong) ===
Ping pong (乒乓) is the official name for the sport of table tennis in China. Apart from the national representative team, the table tennis community in China continues to produce many world-class players, and this depth of skill allows the country to continue dominating recent world titles after a short break during the 1990s. The overwhelming dominance of China in the sport has triggered a series of rules changes in the International Table Tennis Federation and as part of the Olympics. Ma Long was once the highest-ranked Chinese table tennis players, and held the highest-ranked player in the world title for many years. Deng Yaping is regarded by many as one of the greatest table tennis players of all time, along with Zhang Jike, Liu Guoliang, and Kong Linghui.

The sport played an important role in China's international relations; in April 1972, the U.S. table tennis team were invited to visit China, an event later called "Ping-pong diplomacy". Table tennis is the biggest amateur recreational sport in China with an estimated 300 million players.

=== Tennis ===
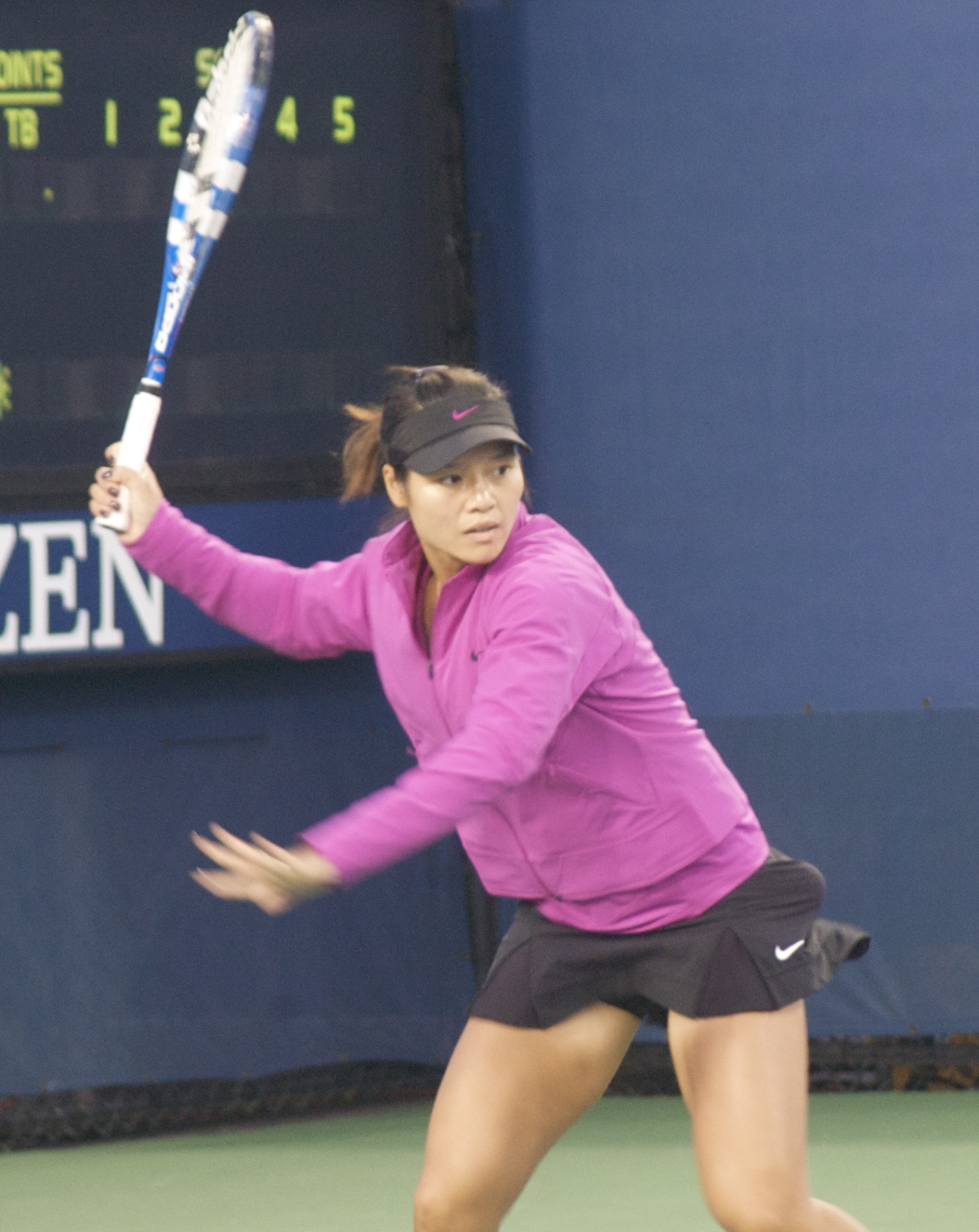
Li Na is the first player from China and Asia to win a Grand Slam title.

Tennis is a growing recreational sport in China, although access to courts can be limited in densely populated urban areas. Recently Chinese tennis players, especially women, have seen success internationally both at the amateur level and professionally. International tennis tournaments receive wide coverage on Chinese sporting channels, being the third most popular after football and basketball.

=== Wushu ===
Wushu is a professional sport in China and is also an academic field. The Chinese Wushu Association (CWA) has managed the progress of wushu in China since its formation in 1958 which has resulted in a system of provincial and municipal organizations which host various events and competitions. Wushu is promoted at every age and experience level. The CWA has had great influence on the International Wushu Federation, especially on how wushu is judged, managed, and promoted.

China is the most successful nation at the World Wushu Championships, having won 232 medals, 218 of them gold, since the first competition in 1991. China has also been very successful at other IWUF-related events including the World Junior Wushu Championships, Taolu World Cup, and Sanda World Cup, as well as the sports appearance at multi-sport events such as the Asian Games, the defunct East Asian Games, World Games, World Combat Games, and others. China has also had great successes at the 2008 Beijing Wushu Tournament and 2014 Nanjing Youth Wushu Tournament where wushu was a demonstration event at the 2008 and 2014 Olympic celebrations.

Many retired wushu taolu athletes have had great success as film actors, one of the most notable being Jet Li. Many sanda fighters have had great success at other disciplines of fighting such as MMA, Shootfighting, and Kickboxing.

== In international competition ==
The discourse of a "whole of nation system" (xinxing juguo tizhi) developed in the context of training athletes in China for international competition." The idea of a "whole of nation system" was adapted in 2006 and 2007 into discourse on China's science and technology innovation policies, and then adapted into official innovation policy discourses a few years later.

=== Overview ===
Back in March 1959, at the 25th World Table Tennis Championships held in Germany, the table-tennis player Rong Guotuan won the first world title in China's sporting history. It was followed by many more successes. By the end of 2004 Chinese athletes had altogether won 1,800 world championships and broken 1,119 world records. In the 16 years since 1989, Chinese athletes have won 1,446 world championships, accounting for 80.3% of the total, and had broken 737 world records, making up 65.9% of the total. It was a period when China's competitive sports developed continuously and rapidly. At the 2008 Olympics in Beijing, China made its best ever Olympic showing, with a tally of 100 medals, including 51 golds, 21 silvers and 28 bronzes, coming first in the medals table, achieving a major breakthrough in China's sporting history.

The results in competitive sports were down to a training system which is constantly being perfected. It is based on youth amateur sports schools and basic-level clubs, with teams representing localities as the backbone, and the national team at the highest level. The training system ensures that China elite teams maintain a year-round squad of some 20,000 athletes.

=== Olympic Games ===
In July 2001, Beijing finally succeeded in its bid to bring the 2008 Summer Olympics. The Beijing Organizing Committee for the Games of the XXIX Olympiad (BOCOG), established at the end of 2001, set the themes for the 2008 Games as "Green Olympics", "high-tech Olympics" and "Humanistic Olympics". Seven venues, including the National Stadium and the National Swimming Center have ushered in a new period of contemporary architecture for Beijing. The centerpiece of the 2008 Games was "the bird's nest" National Stadium. With a capacity of 91,000 spectators, the stadium hosted the opening and closing ceremonies as well as track-and-field events.

Since 1949, China has participated in eight Summer Olympics and nine Winter Olympics, winning 385 medals at the Summer Olympics and 44 medals at the Winter Olympics. At the Los Angeles, Barcelona and Atlanta Olympics, China came fourth in the gold medals table, second at the Athens & London Olympics. It won first at the Beijing Olympics with 51 gold medals, which was 25 more than the second place team.

=== Asian Games ===
People's Republic of China first competed at the Asian Games in 1974. China has also participated at the Asian Winter Games since the first games held in 1986 in Sapporo. China also hosted the three Summer Games in 1990, 2010, and 2022 and the three Winter Games in 1996, 2007, and 2025.

During the 1974 Asian Games, China became the second nation in the history of Asian Games after Japan in 1958 to cross the 100 medal-mark in one edition.

China has led the gold medal count in each Asian Games since 1982.

In 1986, China, together with Japan and South Korea became the first three countries in the history of Asian Games to cross the total 200 medal-mark in one edition, having become the only three countries with three-digit medal tally as well in that year.

China has been the only team to win more than 200 total medals at each Asian Games since 1986.

In 1990, China achieved a significant milestone by being the first nation to surpass the threshold of 100 gold medals and 300 total medals in a single edition.

China also stands out among all Asian teams, being the only one to win more than 100 gold medals at each Asian Games since 1990.

In 2010, China became the first nation in the history of Asian Games to cross the 400 medal-mark in one edition.

At the 2022 Asian Games, China became the first nation to reach 200 gold medals in one edition.

As of 2026, over the course of 14 Asian Summer Games, China finished at the top of the medal table 12 times. China finished at the top of the medal table 4 times out of 10 editions of the Asian Winter Games.

=== National Games ===
Sport in China
- Simplified Chinese: 中华人民共和国全国运动会
- Traditional Chinese: 中華人民共和國全國運動會
- Literal meaning: All-People's Republic of China Games
Transcriptions
Standard Mandarin
- Hanyu Pinyin: Zhōnghuá Rénmín Gònghéguó Quánguó Yùndònghuì
- Wade–Giles: Chunghua Jenmin Kunghekuo Ch'üankuo Yüntunghui

Abbreviation
- Simplified Chinese: 全国运动会
- Traditional Chinese: 全國運動會
Transcriptions
Standard Mandarin
- Hanyu Pinyin: Quánguó Yùndònghuì
- Wade–Giles: Ch'üankuo Yüntunghui

Alternative abbreviation
- Simplified Chinese: 全运会
- Traditional Chinese: 全運會
Transcriptions
Standard Mandarin
- Hanyu Pinyin: Quányùnhuì
- Wade–Giles: Ch'üanyünhui

The National Games of the People's Republic of China is the highest-level comprehensive multi-sport event of China. It is hosted by the General Administration of Sport of China. The games is held every four years, usually in the summer or autumn of the year after the Summer Olympics.

The National Games was first held in 1959 in Beijing at the Workers' Stadium, when 10,658 athletes competed across 384 events in 42 sports.

== Youth sports ==
Schools have professional physical educators and exercise facilities and students failing to reach the required physical standards are not allowed to go on to higher schools. Spring and autumn sports meets are annual events. The National Middle School Games and National University Games are held every four years. Promising teenagers are sent to amateur sports schools to receive specialized training.

Because Chinese athletes generally start their sporting careers at a young age, some receive little education and often struggle to find a job when they retire, with a 2012 study of the State General Administration of Sports learning that almost half the sportspeople failed to find employment. The government body then started to organize retraining courses to help them learn new skills and get jobs.

== Sport in Hong Kong ==
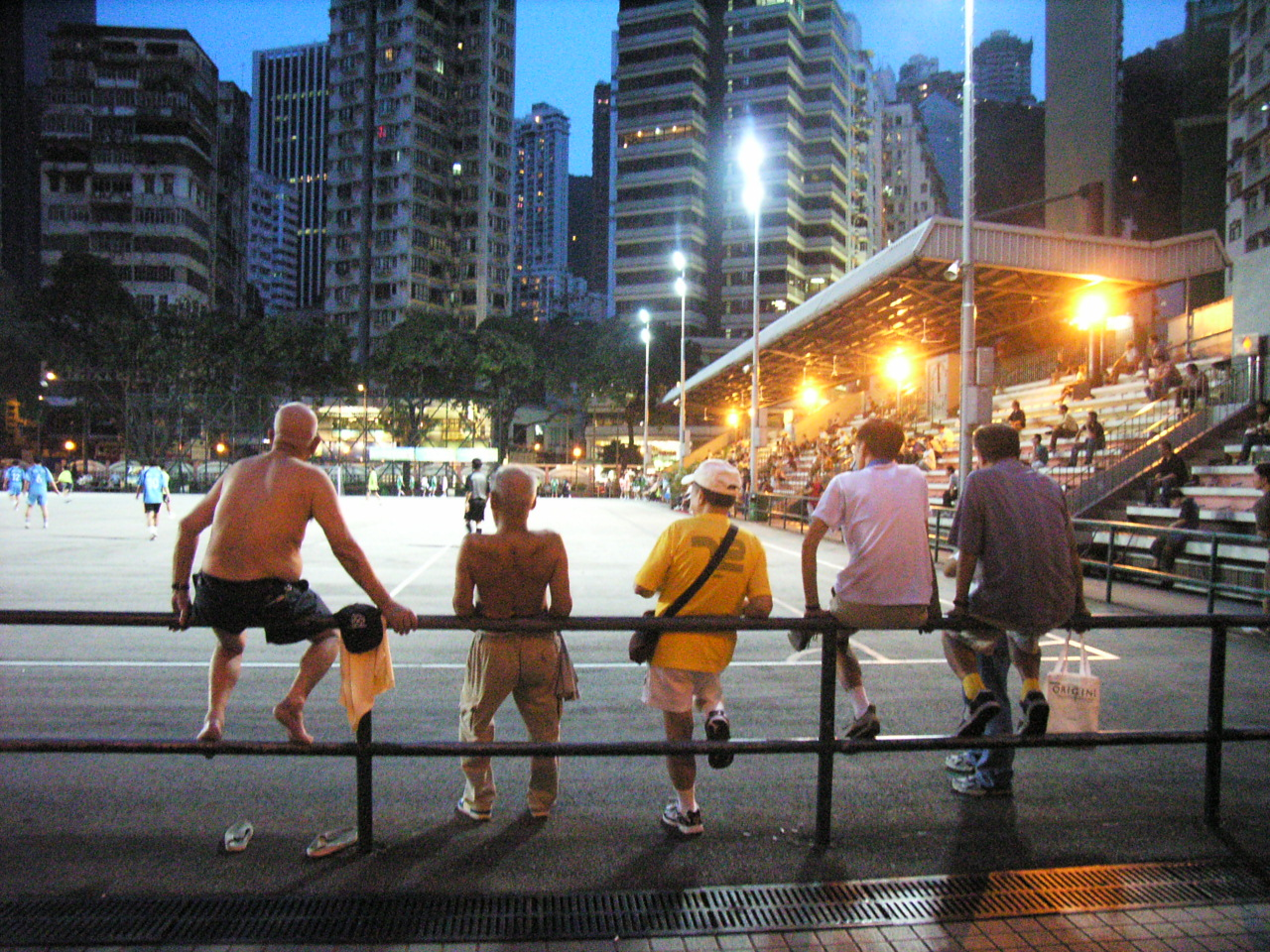
Night football game in Wan Chai

Sports in Hong Kong are a significant part of its culture. Due to British influence going as far back as the late 19th century, Hong Kong had an earlier introduction to Western athletics compared than other Asia regions.

In terms of participation, jogging, swimming, badminton, basketball, fitness, association football have the most participants. In terms of favourites, badminton (27.5%), swimming (24%), association football (18.4%), basketball (9.8%), and tennis (3.8%) are the most popular sports.

Golf is an increasingly popular sport, despite the relatively few number of courses in the city. In 2009, Hong Kong successfully organised the V East Asian Games and it was the biggest sporting event ever held in the territory. Other major international sporting events including the Equestrian at the 2008 Summer Olympics, the Hong Kong Open Golf Championship, the Hong Kong Sevens, Hong Kong Marathon, AFC Asian Cup, FIFA ASEAN Cup Division 2, Hong Kong Badminton Open, Hong Kong Tennis Classic, Premier League Asia Trophy, and Lunar New Year Cup. Hong Kong athletes have improved in worldwide rankings. As of 2010, there are 32 Hong Kong athletes from seven sports ranking in world's Top 20, 29 athletes in six sports in Asia top 10 ranking. Moreover, Hong Kong is equally impressive performance of athletes with disabilities in 2009, having won four world championships and two Asian Champions.

== Sport in Macau ==
Macau residents participate in a wide variety of sports for recreation and competition. Football, basketball, volleyball, Dragon Boat, jogging, swimming, table tennis, and badminton are among the most popular in the community. Local leagues and competitions are organized regularly every year, but owing to Macau's small population (about half a million) professional leagues are financially unfeasible and so most participants are merely local sport enthusiasts.

There are many sport associations and clubs in Macau which frequently organize local or regional sporting events and competitions. Owing to the amateur nature of local sports, all sport associations and clubs in Macau are run by organizations under government subsidies or sponsorships. The Macau Sport Development Board is the department responsible for Macau's sport development, venue operations and organization of major international sport events held in Macau (except the Macau Grand Prix, which is organized by the Macau Grand Prix Committee).

== Traditional sports ==
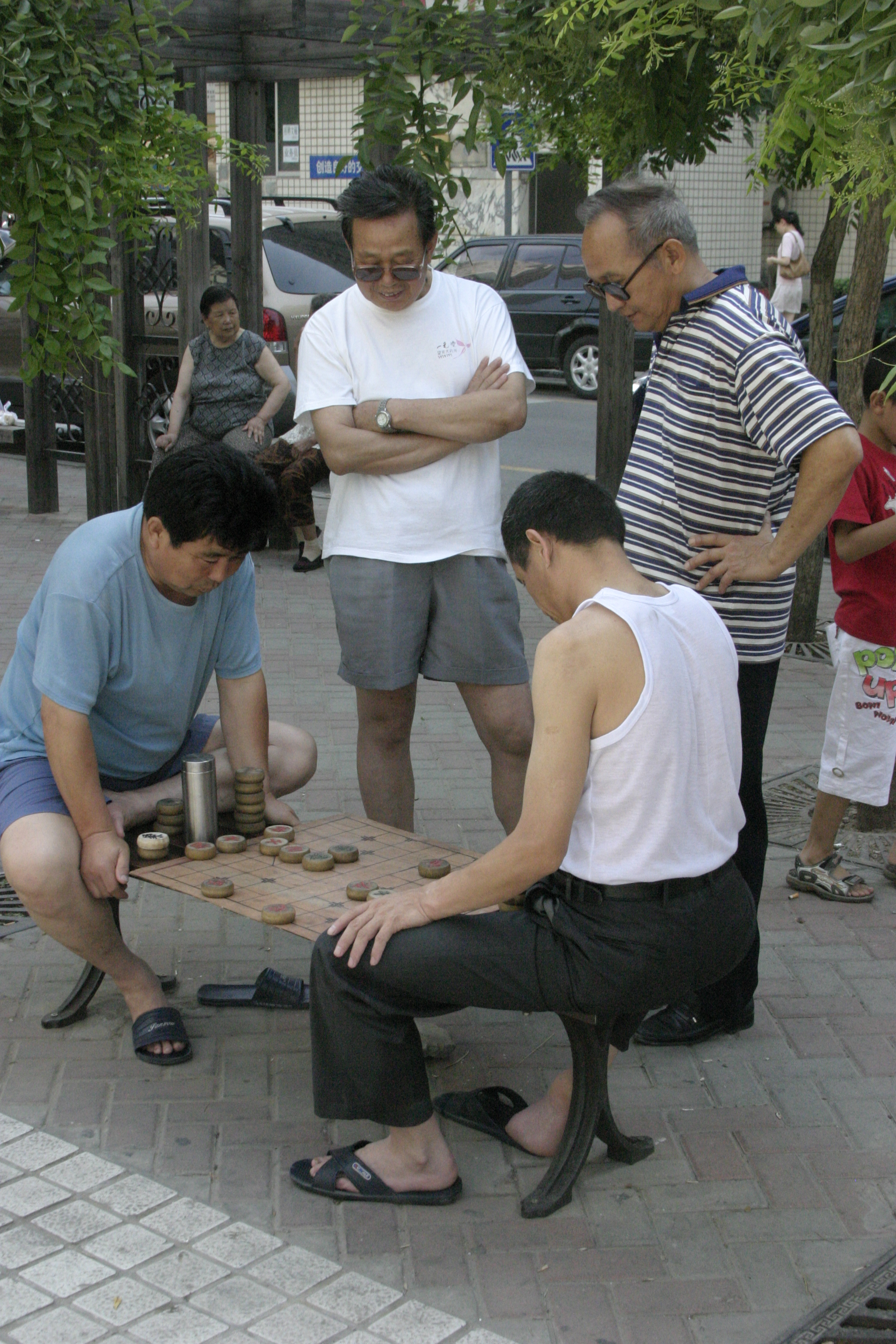
It is common for Chinese people to play xiangqi, or Chinese Chess, in public.

Traditional sports with distinct Chinese characteristics are also very popular, including martial arts, taijiquan (shadow boxing), qigong (deep breathing exercises), xiangqi (Chinese chess), weiqi (known as "Go" in the West) and Mahjong.

Taijiquan is a kind of Chinese boxing, combining control of breath, mind and body. It emphasizes body movement following mind movements, tempering toughness with gentleness and graceful carriage.

Qigong is a unique Chinese way of keeping fit. It aims at enhancing health, prolonging life, curing illness and improving physiological functions by concentrating the mind and regulating the breath. There are various entertaining and competitive sports activities in the minority-inhabited areas, for example, wrestling and horsemanship among Mongols, Uygurs and Kazaks; Tibetan yak racing; Korean "seesaw jumping"; crossbow archery among the Miao, and dragon-boat racing among the Dai ethnic minority.

Xiangqi and weiqi were two of the five sports featured at the 2008 World Mind Sports Games held in Beijing.

== Sports business ==
China's sports industry has gone through three stages. The first was the Exploratory Stage, from 1978 to 1992. The second was the formative stage, from 1993 to 1996. The third is the development stage, from 1997 to the present.

Since the 2010s, Chinese corporations like China Media Capital, CITIC Group, Fosun International and Wanda Group have invested heavily in international sports businesses, including marketing and media companies like Infront and MP & Silva, and teams like City Football Group, Aston Villa F.C., Wolverhampton Wanderers, RCD Espanyol, Atlético Madrid, Inter Milan, SK Slavia Prague, FC Sochaux and ADO Den Haag.

== Doping ==
The People's Republic of China was alleged to have conducted a state-sanctioned doping operation in the 1980s and 1990s by former General Administration of Sport physician Xue Yinxian. The World Anti-Doping Agency investigated these allegations and found no evidence to corroborate them. Other allegations of doping have focused on swimmers and track and field athletes, such as those taught by Ma Junren (the Ma Family Army). In the Olympics, China has been stripped of a total of three gold medals for doping; all were weightlifters competing in the 2008 Summer Olympics. Eleven Chinese athletes were stripped of medals for doping at the 1994 Asian Games.

In 2004, the State Council published its Anti-Doping Regulations, which have been in force since March 1, 2004.

== See also ==
- Chinese fitness dancing
- List of multi-sport events held by China
- Sport in Taiwan

== Bibliography ==
- Susan Brownell: Training the Body for China: Sports in the Moral Order of the People's Republic, University of Chicago Press, 1995, ISBN 0-226-07647-4
- Dong Jinxia: Women, Sport and Society in Modern China: Holding Up More Than Half the Sky, Routledge, 2002, ISBN 0-7146-8214-4
- Guoqi Xu: Olympic Dreams: China and Sports, 1895-2008, Harvard University Press, 2008, ISBN 0-674-02840-6
- Hong Fan: Footbinding, Feminism and Freedom: The Liberation of Women's Bodies in Modern China (Cass Series—Sport in the Global Society), Paperback Edition, Routledge 1997, ISBN 0-7146-4334-3
- Andrew D. Morris: Marrow of the Nation: A History of Sport and Physical Culture in Republican China, University of California Press, 2004, ISBN 0-520-24084-7
- James Riordan, Robin Jones (ed.): Sport and Physical Education in China, Routledge 1999, ISBN 0-419-22030-5
