= Olympic House =

Building in So Kon Po, Hong Kong

Coordinates: 22.273640°N 114.187483°E

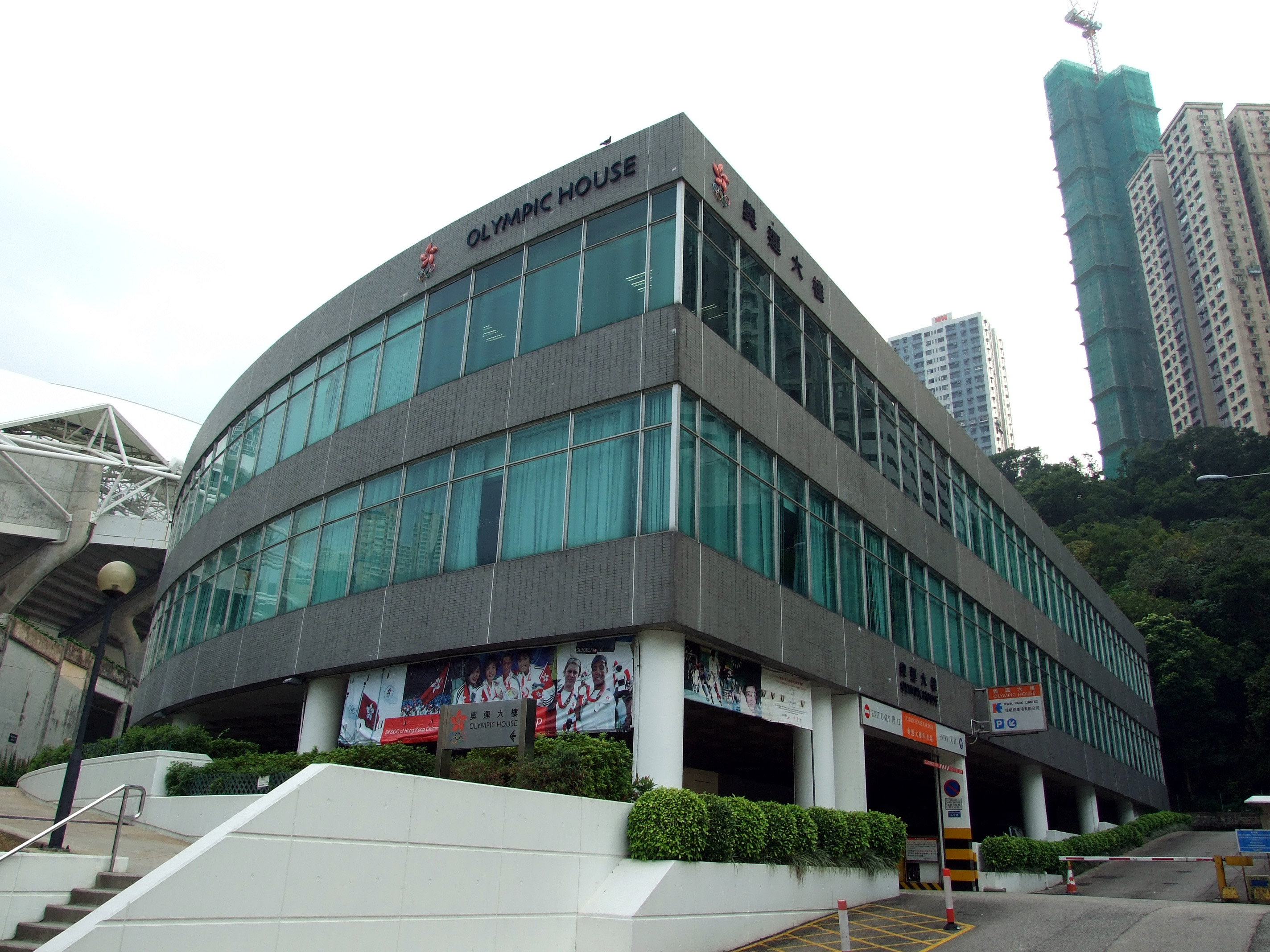
Olympic House

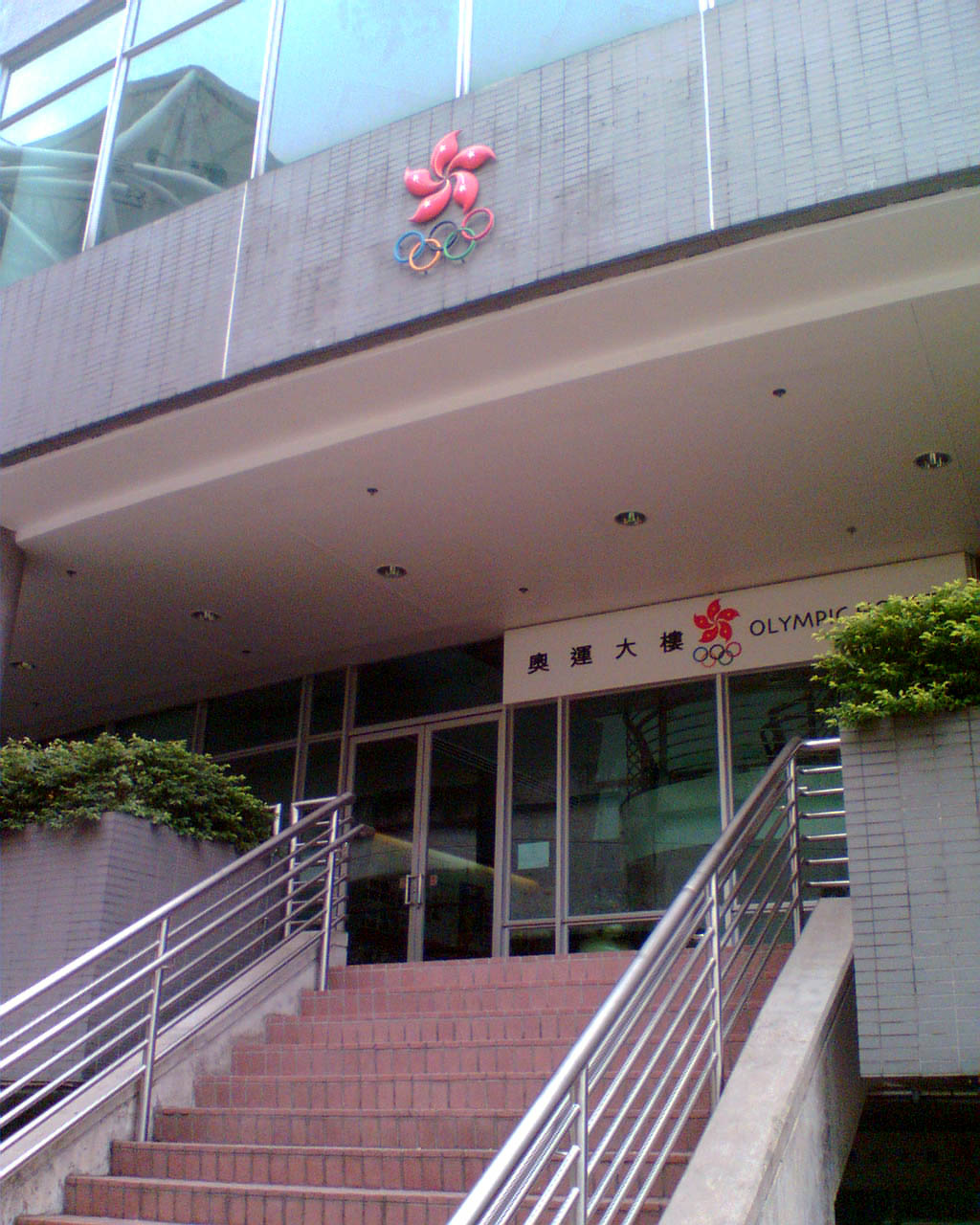
Entrance

Olympic House (Chinese: 奧運大樓), originally named Sports House (體育大樓) is home to the offices of 44 officially sanctioned Hong Kong sports associations, including Hong Kong Rugby Union, Hong Kong Triathlon Association and Hong Kong Sailing Federation. It also houses the Territory's National Olympic Committee, the Sports Federation and Olympic Committee of Hong Kong, China, which oversees the building's management.

Opened in 1994, the building is immediately adjacent to Hong Kong Stadium, in So Kon Po in Causeway Bay.

== History ==
On 11 July 2005, Jacques Rogge, IOC Chairman and Timothy Fok, chair of the local Olympic Committee, led a ceremony to rename the building 'Olympic House' ahead of the 2008 Beijing Olympic Games and Paralympics, with IOC permission to use of the official emblem of the games, for which Hong Kong would host the equestrian events (at the Hong Kong Sports Institute in Fo Tan).

== See also ==
- Hong Kong Sports Institute
- Hong Kong at the Olympics
