= Bids for the 2014 Asian Games =

Overview
- XVII Asian Games; II Asian Para Games
- Winner: Incheon; Runner-up: New Delhi

Details
- Committee: OCA
- Election venue: Kuwait City, Kuwait; 26th OCA General Assembly

Map
- Location of the bidding cities

Important dates
- Bid: 30 June 2005
- Decision: 17 April 2007

Decision
- Winner: Incheon (32 votes)
- Runner-up: New Delhi (13 votes)

Two cities submitted bids to host the 2014 Asian Games that were recognized by the Olympic Council of Asia (OCA). OCA selected Incheon, South Korea over New Delhi, India as the host for 17th Asian Games on 17 April 2007, at its 26th General Assembly held in Kuwait City, Kuwait by a vote of 32 to 13. The host city election was originally scheduled to be held during the 25th OCA General Assembly in Doha, Qatar.

== Bidding process ==
- Submission of letters of intent (31 March 2005)
- Deadline for the submission of bids (30 June 2005)
- OCA Evaluation Committee visit to New Delhi (9–11 November 2006)
- OCA Evaluation Committee visit to Incheon (12–14 November 2006)
- Election of the host city during the 26th OCA General Assembly at the Marriott Hotel in Kuwait City, Kuwait (17 April 2007)

2014 Asian Games bidding results
City	NOC	Round 1
Incheon	South Korea	32
New Delhi	India	13

== Candidate cities ==
Logo	City	Country	National Olympic Committee	Result
	Incheon	South Korea	Korean Sport & Olympic Committee (KOC)	Winner
Incheon, the third largest city in South Korea with a population of 2.74 million, submitted the bid after receiving approval from the central government. It was planning to build 21 new sports facilities by 2008, including an indoor swimming pool near Munhak Stadium. The city was bidding for the games on the basis of the expected economic benefits it could get from hosting the games, which included induced production of 13 trillion won (10.6 trillion won for Incheon), induced added-value of 5.6 trillion won (4.5 trillion won for Incheon) and induced employment of 270,000 people (200,000 for Incheon). At the same time, it was hoping that a special support law will pass the National Assembly to help renew its infrastructure such as roads, transportation and communication facilities. Many member states of the OCA who voted for Incheon were convinced of its advantage over New Delhi in terms of municipal infrastructure, overall environment, venue facilities, marketing capabilities and information technology. The Bidding Committee stated that of the expected games cost of 4.9 trillion won (US$5.3 trillion), more than 54 percent of the funding or 2.7 trillion won of the total will come from the Incheon municipal government, while the rest will be covered by central government grants and corporate sponsorships. A 7-year program named the OCA-Incheon Vision 2014 program and costed US$20 million was established as part of the bid to support the countries that have not yet won a medal at the Games, by providing athletes training facilities, courses, coaches and the opportunity to train in South Korea. Incheon previously hosted many international sports competitions including 2005 Asian Athletics Championships and was one of the host cities of the 2002 FIFA World Cup. South Korea last hosted the Games back in 1986 in the capital city of Seoul and 2002 in Busan, in addition to a Winter edition in 1999 in Gangwon Province. The bid logo was an image of Waves, Sun and Green Field.
	New Delhi	India	Indian Olympic Association (IOA)	First runner-up
On 15 May 2004, IOA president Suresh Kalmadi announced New Delhi's candidacy during the Indian leg of the Doha 2006 Asian Games Fun Run. The capital city of India had previous experience of hosting the Asian Games in 1951 and 1982 and recently won the rights to host the 2010 Commonwealth Games on 14 November 2003. Therefore, much of the venues and infrastructures would have been in place and required only renovation. This was the city's second consecutive time to bid for its third Asian Games, with its first being for the 2006 edition, which were awarded to Doha, Qatar.

== Showed preliminary interest ==
Two countries expressed interest in bidding and submitted letter of intent, but failed to submit bids when applications were due.

- Amman Jordan
- Hanoi Vietnam
