= Bids for the 2030 and 2034 Asian Games =

Bids for the 2034 Asian Games and Para Games
Overview
- XXII Asian Games; VII Asian Para Games
- Winner: Riyadh

Details
- Committee: OCA

Map
- Location of the bidding cities

Important dates
- Bid: 23 April 2020
- Decision: 16 December 2020

Decision
- Winner: Riyadh
- Runner-up

Bids for the 2030 Asian Games and Para Games
Overview
- XXI Asian Games; VI Asian Para Games
- Winner: Doha

Details
- Committee: OCA

Map
- Location of the bidding cities

Important dates
- Bid: 23 April 2020
- Decision: 16 December 2020

Decision
- Winner: Doha
- Runner-up

Two bids—Doha and Riyadh—were initially submitted for the 2030 Asian Games. Before the election at the 39th OCA General Assembly in Muscat, Oman, on 16 December 2020, the Olympic Council of Asia (OCA) agreed to award the 2030 and 2034 Games, avoiding a win-lose situation. Doha won the 2030 Games with the higher votes than Riyadh—won the 2034 Games.

== Bidding process ==
The following is the timeline of the bidding process for the 2030 Asian Games.

- Olympic Council of Asia (OCA) sent a circular to all 45 National Olympic Committees inviting bids (23 January 2020)
- Deadline for the submission of bids (22 April 2020)
- Announcement of bidding cities by OCA (23 April 2020)
- Candidature files submission (4 October 2020)
- OCA Evaluation Committee visit to Riyadh (8–10 November 2020)
- OCA Evaluation Committee visit to Doha (11–13 November 2020)
- Election of the host city during the 39th OCA General Assembly at the Marriott Hotel in Muscat, Oman (16 December 2020)

=== Final selection process ===
An Olympic Council of Asia's (OCA) Evaluation Committee led by Andrey Krukov from Kazakhstan inspected the candidate cities of Doha and Riyadh. The OCA voted on 16 December 2020 at the 39th OCA General Assembly in Muscat, Oman to select the host city. On 15 December 2020, OCA President Sheikh Ahmad Al-Fahad Al-Sabah announced that he would attempt to find a dual-host city solution to avoid a vote for the 2030 Asian Games, by persuading one city to host the event in 2030 and the other to organize the competition in 2034. On 16 December 2020, it was announced that Doha will host 2030 Games with the highest votes and Riyadh will host the 2034 Games. Saudi Arabia had asked the OCA to halt electronic voting on the host of the 2030 Asian Games due to "the possibility of technical fraud".

2030 Asian Games bidding results
City	Nation	Votes	Result
Doha	Qatar	27	Doha awarded 2030 Asian Games
Riyadh	Saudi Arabia	10	Riyadh awarded 2034 Asian Games
Abstentions		8	

== Candidate cities ==
The candidate cities for the 2030 Asian Games were, in order of drawing lots:

- Doha, Qatar

On 30 September 2019, Qatari capital Doha launched its bid to host the 2030 edition. On 23 April 2020, the OCA confirmed that the Qatar Olympic Committee (QOC) had submitted the bid documents and the letters of support from the Government of Qatar. On 1 September 2020, Doha 2030 unveiled its logo containing the motifs of desert sand dunes, islamic geometric patterns, the Katara Pigeon Towers and the Museum of Islamic Art and the slogan, "Your Gateway". On 3 December 2020, Doha 2030 bid committee organized three virtual workshops and shared its bid plans with OCA member nations. Doha previously hosted the 2006 edition and planned to reuse most of the existing venues that were used for the event should it be awarded the 2030 edition.

- Riyadh, Saudi Arabia

The OCA confirmed on 23 April 2020, that the Saudi Arabian Olympic Committee (SAOC) had submitted the bid documents and the letters of support from the Government of Saudi Arabia to host the Games in Riyadh. On 5 October 2020, Riyadh 2030 unveiled its logo which depicting a map of Saudi Arabia enclosing several sport pictograms and its slogan, “Transforming The Future”. On 14 December 2020, about 95% of Riyadh and 91% of Saudi population supported the city's hosting the 2030 Asian Games bid, according to a survey conducted by local market research and data analysis firm DRC. Unlike Doha, Riyadh had never hosted the event before.

== Previously interested in bidding ==
The following cities interested in bidding for the sporting event, but did not submit by the deadline.

- Chungcheong Megacity, South Korea

In February 2019, regional governments including Daejeon, Sejong, North Chungcheong and South Chungcheong teamed up to jointly bid for the Games in hope that the international sports competition would foster the regional economic growth.

- India

Around the same time the Indian Olympic Association confirmed their intentions in bidding for the 141st IOC Session, the 2026 Summer Youth Olympics, and the 2032 Summer Olympics, the committee also confirmed plans to bid for the 2030 Asian Games. On 24 April 2020, IOA President Narendra Batra announced that the IOA could not submit its bid because of the COVID-19 pandemic and consequently, were unable to secure government guarantees in time.

- Philippines

The Philippine Olympic Committee confirmed that they were in the discussion stage of bidding for the 2030 Asian Games during their preparation for 2019 Southeast Asian Games, which would be held in Clark, Metro Manila and Subic, considered as a stepping stone for its possible bid. The vice president of the Olympic Council of Asia also recommended that the Philippines bid for the Games.

- Taipei, Chinese Taipei

The Mayor of Taipei, Ko Wen-je, had announced that the Taipei City Government planned a bid to host the games.

- Tashkent and Samarkand, Uzbekistan

During OCA President Sheikh Ahmed Al-Fahad Al-Ahmed Al-Sabah's visit to Uzbekistan in February 2019, the National Olympic Committee of the Republic of Uzbekistan declared that the parties discussed the possibility of holding the Games in two cities in Uzbekistan, Tashkent and Samarkand.
