= Hong Kong bid for the 2006 Asian Games =

Bids for the 2006 Asian Games
Overview
- XV Asian Games
- Winner: Doha; Runner-up: Kuala Lumpur; Shortlist: Hong Kong · New Delhi

Details
- City: Hong Kong, China
- Chair: Anson Chan
- NOC: Sports Federation and Olympic Committee of Hong Kong, China

Previous Games hosted
- None

Decision
- Result: 2nd runner-up (6 votes)

Ah Lung, the dragon was the mascot for the Hong Kong 2006 Asian Games bidding campaign.

The Hong Kong bid for the 2006 Asian Games was an unsuccessful bid, first recognised by the Olympic Council of Asia (OCA) on 30 June 2000.

== History ==
The Hong Kong Government decided to support the expression of interest by the Sports Federation and Olympic Committee of Hong Kong, China (SF & OC) for hosting the 2006 Asian Games by the end of 1999. The Government supported its decision on the grounds that hosting the 2006 Games help foster a sense of unity, social cohesion and national pride, while representing an extremely attractive opportunity for marketing Hong Kong overseas. In February 2000, the SF & OC submitted a letter of intent for hosting the 2006 Games to the Olympic Council of Asia (OCA). On 3 March 2000, the Asian Games Bid Committee was established, chaired by then-Chief Secretary for Administration Anson Chan. The Hong Kong Sports Association for the Physically Disabled also made a presentation to bid for hosting the 2006 FESPIC Games. On 12 May 2000, the Finance Committee of the Legislative Council accepted in principle the operating cost of HK$1,925 million and the operating deficit of $945 million for hosting the 2006 Asian Games and FESPIC Games.

Then-Chief Secretary Mrs Anson Chan putting her autograph onto a "Hong Kong For Sure" poster when she visited the hospitality suite set up by the Asian Games Bid Team at one of the official hotels housing Olympic officials and delegates in Sydney.

=== Bidding Process ===
The Asian Games Bid Committee engaged in publicity work domestically and abroad. The Committee adopted the slogan "Hong Kong for Sure!" (Chinese: 「香港一定得」) and designed a mascot for promotion. The Bid Committee also lobbied members of the Olympic Council of Asia, first at the annual meeting of the NOC Association in Rio de Janeiro in May 2000. Hong Kong subsequently submitted its formal bid by the deadline on 30 June 2000. The evaluation committee of the OCA, headed by the then vice-president of the association Muhammad Latif Butt, inspected Hong Kong on 19 and 20 July 2000. During the 2000 Summer Olympics, then-Chief Secretary for Administration Anson Chan met in Sydney the President of the OCA and delegates of key countries in the bidding process.

On November 12, 2000, voting for the 2006 venue took place during the 19th Olympic Council of Asia (OCA) General Assembly held in Busan, South Korea to choose a host city from four candidate cities: Doha, Kuala Lumpur, Hong Kong and New Delhi. The voting involved the 41 members of the Olympic Council of Asia and consisted of three rounds, each round eliminating one of the bidding cities. Doha emerged victorious in the second round after winning 22 votes – more than half of the available votes, which according to the regulations of the OCA, cancelled the need for a third one. On the other hand, Hong Kong ranked third with only 6 votes.

== Venues ==
Thirty-one sports events were proposed by the SF & OC for the 2006 Asian Games, including mandatory ones on athletics and swimming. Apart from the Ma On Shan Sports Centre due for completion in 2003, all venues are existing facilities, the majority of which are managed by the Leisure and Cultural Services Department. In its bid, the Asian Games Bid Committee has indicated the possibility of holding the Opening Ceremony at the Sha Tin Racecourse, Happy Valley Racecourse or a newly built stadium at Kai Tak or West Kowloon to house a desirable capacity of 70,000 spectators.

- Tai Hang Tung Recreation Ground - Archery
- Shing Mun River Water Sports Centre - Canoe/Kayak and Rowing
- Beas River Country Club - Equestrian
- Fanling Golf Course - Golf
- Clearwater Bay Golf & Country Club - Sailing
- Lo Wu Shooting Range / Pillar Point Shooting Range - Shooting
- Hong Kong Sports Institute - Hockey
- South China Athletic Association - Bowling
- Ma On Shan Sports Ground - Athletics
- Kwai Chung Sports Ground - Cycling
- Kowloon Park Swimming Pool Complex - Swimming
- Victoria Park Tennis Centre Court - Tennis
- Hong Kong Squash Centre - Squash
- Hong Kong Stadium - Football and Rugby
- Ma On Shan Sports Centre - Handball
- Queen Elizabeth Stadium - Boxing and Karatedo
- Hong Kong Coliseum - Basketball and Volleyball
- Hong Kong Convention and Exhibition Centre - Badminton, Fencing, Gymnastics, Judo, Table Tennis, Taekwondo, Weightlifting, Wrestling, Billiards/Snooker and Wushu

== See also ==
- Sport in Hong Kong
- Hong Kong at the Asian Games
- Bids for the 2022 Asian Games
