= Bids for the 2022 Asian Games =

Bids for the 2022 Asian Games and Para Games
Overview
- XIX Asian Games; IV Asian Para Games
- Winner: Hangzhou

Details
- Committee: OCA
- Election venue: Ashgabat, Turkmenistan; 34th OCA General Assembly

Map
- Location of the bidding cities

Important dates
- Bid: August 5, 2015
- Decision: September 16, 2015

Decision
- Winner: Hangzhou
- Runner-up

Unlike previous editions, only one city has completed the entire bid process for the 2022 Asian Games (also known as XIX Asian Games), completed in August 2015. Thus, it was up to the Olympic Council of Asia to decide to give the rights to host the event to the Chinese city of Hangzhou as the host of the event during the institution's 34th General Assembly, held in Ashgabat, Turkmenistan. The confirmation was made during a press conference led by the OCA President Sheikh Ahmed Al-Fahad Al-Ahmed Al-Sabah.

== Candidate city ==
City	Country	National Olympic Committee	Result
Hangzhou	China	Chinese Olympic Committee (COC)	Winner
Chinese Olympic Committee officially launched the bid on August 18, 2015, days after the winning of Beijing's 2022 Winter Olympics bid. The capital of Zhejiang, Hangzhou was the only bidder for the event. This will be the third time the multi-sport competition has been awarded to China following Beijing in 1990 and Guangzhou in 2010 Asian Games.

== Potential bids ==
- Hong Kong – Hong Kong made a failed bid for the 2006 Asian Games. The Government of the Hong Kong Special Administrative Region decided to submit a formal bid to OCA on December 14, 2010, for the 2023 Games. Previously, the region successfully hosted the 2009 East Asian Games. The original budget announced by the Government in September to host the games was a total of 44 billion HK dollars, among which 13.7–14.5 billion HK dollars would be direct cost. The Government decided to cut over half of the direct budget in early November in order to gather more public support. After several promotional campaigns, citizen support remains around 30%, with majority of citizens (57%) against holding the event in 2023, according to a survey result. The Government's appropriation bill for hosting the 2023 Games was rejected by the Legislative Council of Hong Kong in January 2011.
- Thailand – Thailand would like to host the fifth Asian Games in 2022. But Thailand missed to submit the bid information because of delayed obtainment bid information and approvement from the cabinet yet. Although National Olympic Committee of Thailand make a proposal about postponement for submit bid information from August 5, 2015, to September 9, 2015, OCA denied for Thai proposal.
