= Bids for the 2010 Asian Games =

Overview
- XVI Asian Games; I Asian Para Games
- Winner: Guangzhou

Details
- Committee: OCA
- Election venue: Doha, Qatar; 23rd OCA General Assembly

Map
- Location of the bidding cities

Important dates
- Bid: 31 March 2004
- Decision: 1 July 2004

Decision
- Winner: Guangzhou
- Runner-up

The Olympic Council of Asia (OCA) received two bids to host the 2010 Asian Games from Guangzhou, China and Kuala Lumpur, Malaysia. Later in the bidding process, Kuala Lumpur withdrew their bid, leaving Guangzhou as the sole bidder. Guangzhou was elected as the host city on 1 July 2004.

== Bidding process ==
- Submission of letters of intent (20 December 2003)
- Deadline for the submission of bids (31 March 2004)
- OCA Evaluation Committee visit to Kuala Lumpur (12–13 April 2004)
- OCA Evaluation Committee visit to Guangzhou (14–16 April 2004)
- Election of the host city during the 23rd OCA General Assembly at The Ritz-Carlton Hotel in Doha, Qatar (1 July 2004)

== Candidate cities ==
Logo	City	Country	National Olympic Committee	Result
	Guangzhou	China	Chinese Olympic Committee (COC)	Unanimous
Guangzhou's bid was initiated by Hu Shusen, principal of Guangzhou Weilun Sports School, and more than 20 other deputies to the city's people's congress in 2002. On 31 March 2004, the bid report was handed over by the City's delegation led by Xu Deli to the Olympic Council of Asia (OCA) Headquarters in Kuwait. The bidding committee was established in the morning on 8 April 2004. On 10 April 2004, the City's bid for the Asian Games was launched. If the city succeeds in its bid, it will invest 1.1 billion US dollars in sports facilities. 44 competition venues and 44 training venues will be available for the event, with 10 of the competition venues to be built. A total of 200 billion yuan (about 24.1 billion USD) will also be used to solve the traffic problems and improve its ecological environment. The games would feature around 32 to 34 events and is scheduled to be held from 12 to 27 November. The Games Village would also be constructed in Dongpu, east Guangzhou, next to the Guangdong Olympic Sports Center. About 220 billion yuan will be spent to improve infrastructure, build Games village and a new railway station, as well as to complete the second phase of the new Guangzhou Baiyun International Airport construction. Guangzhou was the host city of two notable international sports competitions – 1991 FIFA Women's World Cup and the 2002 Thomas & Uber Cup and two National Games of China in 1987 and 2001. China last hosted the Games back in 1990 in the capital city of Beijing, in addition to a Winter edition in 1996 in Harbin and had recently won the rights to host the 2007 Winter edition in Changchun on 2 October 2002. The bid logo was unveiled on 20 March 2004 alongside the bid slogan "Invigorate Asia, Spark the World", and was an image that resembles Guangzhou in cursive hand Chinese and the number 2010 with a Green Stroke in the middle that resembles Pearl River.
	Kuala Lumpur	Malaysia	Olympic Council of Malaysia (OCM)	Withdrew bid
Kuala Lumpur's candidacy was announced by Olympic Council of Malaysia in May 2002. This was the second consecutive time the capital city of Malaysia was bidding for the Asian Games, with the previous one being for the 2006 edition, which was eventually awarded to Doha, Qatar. It recently hosted the 1998 Commonwealth Games and the 2001 SEA Games and ASEAN Para Games, and much of its venues and infrastructures were in place for the event and deemed suitable for use by the OCA inspection team. The bid logo was a stylised image of the Petronas Towers. The bidding committee was concerned about the terms set out by the Olympic Council of Asia for the bid, which include paying a total of US$15 million licensing fee for Games marketing. But it decided to submit the bid by the deadline pending government support, which was delayed due to 2004 Malaysian general election. On 14 April 2004, the Government of Malaysia declared that it would not support OCM with a Kuala Lumpur bid due to the high cost of hosting the Games, estimated at 366 million US dollars, forcing Kuala Lumpur to withdraw its bid and leaving Guangzhou as the sole bidder. Then-Sports Minister Azalina Othman Said told reporters, “The Cabinet discussed this in the meeting today and we have decided not to offer to host the 2010 Asian Games. According to the estimation by the OCM, the government will need to spend about US$366.128 million (RM1.391 billion) to host the Games... I will instruct my ministry's secretary-general (Datuk Talaat Hussain) to officially inform the OCM about the Cabinet's decision.”

== Showed preliminary interest ==
Two cities expressed interest in bidding and submitted letter of intent, but failed to submit bids when applications were due.

- Amman, Jordan
- Seoul, South Korea - Withdrew after considering that South Korea hosted the 2002 Games in Busan only eight years earlier.
