= List of multi-sport events held by China =

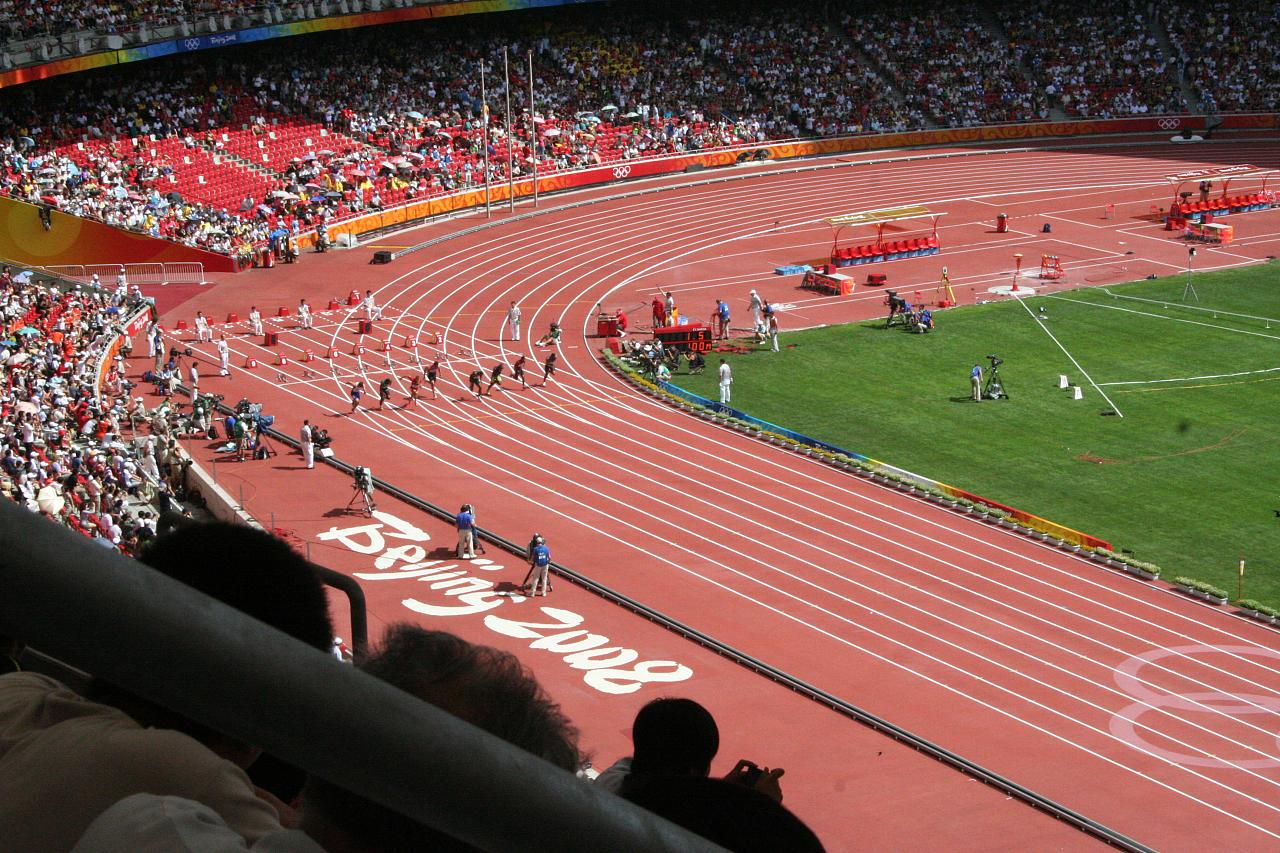
2008 Summer Olympics.

This article lists multi-sport events held by the People's Republic of China (PRC), including Hong Kong (after 1997) and Macau (after 1999).

== Mainland ==
Host city	Event	Date	Teams	Athletes	Sports	Events	Officially opened by	Top placed team
Beijing	1990 Asian Games	September 22 - October 7	36	6,122	29	310	President Yang Shangkun	China
Beijing	1994 FESPIC Games	September 4 - 10	42	2,081	Unknown			
Beijing	2001 Summer Universiade	August 22 - September 1	165	6,757	12	170	CCP General Secretary & President Jiang Zemin	China
Beijing	2008 Summer Olympics (Note: Qingdao, Hong Kong, Shanghai, Tianjin, Shenyang and Qinhuangdao were the co-host cities.)	August 8 - 24	204	10,942	28	302	CCP General Secretary & President Hu Jintao	China
Beijing	2008 Summer Paralympics (Note: Qingdao and Hong Kong were the co-host cities.)	September 6 - 17	146	3,951	20	472	CCP General Secretary & President Hu Jintao	China
Beijing	2008 World Mind Sports Games	October 3 - 18	143	2,763	5	35	N/A	China
Beijing	2010 World Combat Games	August 28 - September 4	96	1,108	12	118	N/A	Russia
Beijing	2022 Winter Olympics (Note: With Zhangjiakou as co-host city.)	February 4 - 20	91	2,871	7	109	CCP General Secretary & President Xi Jinping	Norway
Beijing	2022 Winter Paralympics (Note: With Zhangjiakou as co-host city.)	March 4 - 13	46	564	6	78	CCP General Secretary & President Xi Jinping	China
Tianjin	2013 East Asian Games	October 6 - 15	9	2,422	24	254	Vice Premier Liu Yandong	China
Shanghai	1993 East Asian Games	May 9 - 18	8	1,021	12	170	CCP General Secretary & President Jiang Zemin	China
Shanghai	1998 Gymnasiade	December 12 - 19	Unknown					
Shanghai	2007 Special Olympics World Summer Games	October 2 - 11	165	7,291	25		CCP General Secretary & President Hu Jintao	Unknown
Changchun, Jilin	2007 Asian Winter Games	January 28 - February 4	25	796	5	47	CCP General Secretary & President Hu Jintao	China
Harbin, Heilongjiang	1996 Asian Winter Games	February 4 - 11	15	453	8	43	CCP General Secretary & President Jiang Zemin	China
Harbin, Heilongjiang	2009 Winter Universiade	February 18 - February 28	44	2,326	12	82	State Councilor Liu Yandong	China
Harbin, Heilongjiang	2025 Asian Winter Games	February 7-14	TBD					Future event
Nanjing, Jiangsu	2013 Asian Youth Games	August 16 - 24	45	2,404	16	122	Vice Premier Liu Yandong	China
Nanjing, Jiangsu	2014 Summer Youth Olympics	August 16 - 28	203	3,579	28	222	CCP General Secretary & President Xi Jinping	China
Hangzhou, Zhejiang	2022 Asian Games	23 September - 8 October 2023 (due to COVID-19 pandemic)	45	11,109	40	481	CCP General Secretary & President Xi Jinping	China
Hangzhou, Zhejiang	2022 Asian Para Games	October 22 - 28 2023 (due to COVID-19 pandemic)	44	3,100	22	501	CCP General Secretary & President Xi Jinping	China
Jinjiang, Fujian	2021 Gymnasiade U18	November 26 - December 3 2022	TBD		18	241	TBD	Future event
Haiyang, Shandong	2012 Asian Beach Games	June 16 - 22	43	1,336	13	49	State Councilor Ma Kai	China
Wuhan, Hubei	2019 Military World Games	October 18 - 27	109	9,308	27	329	CCP General Secretary & President Xi Jinping	China
Guangzhou, Guangdong	2010 Asian Games (Note: Foshan, Dongguan and Shanwei were the co-host cities.)	November 12 - 27	45	9,704	42	476	Premier Wen Jiabao	China
Guangzhou, Guangdong	2010 Asian Para Games	December 12 - 19	41	2,405	19	341	Vice Premier Li Keqiang	China
Guangzhou, Guangdong	2017 BRICS Games	June 17 - 21	5	c.300	3	10	N/A	China
Shenzhen, Guangdong	2011 Summer Universiade	August 12 - 23	165	7,999	24	306	CCP General Secretary & President Hu Jintao	China
Chengdu, Sichuan	2019 World Police and Fire Games	August 8 - 18	79	10,678	60	N/A	Governor of Sichuan Yin Li	China
Chengdu, Sichuan	2021 Summer World University Games	28 July - 8 August 2023 (due to COVID-19 pandemic; also replaced cancelled 2023 Summer World University Games)	116	5,059	18	269	CCP General Secretary & President Xi Jinping	China
Chengdu, Sichuan	2025 World Games	7 - 17 August 2025	118	c. 4,000	34	256	State Councilor Shen Yiqin	TBD

== Hong Kong ==
Host city	Event	Date	Teams	Athletes	Sports	Events	Officially opened by	Top placed team
Hong Kong	2003 FESPIC Youth Games	December 24 - 27	15	584	Unknown			
Hong Kong	2009 East Asian Games	December 5 - 13	9	2,377	22	262	State Councilor Liu Yandong	China
Hong Kong	2023 Gay Games (co-hosted with Guadalajara, Mexico)	November 3 - 11, 2023 (due to COVID-19 pandemic)	30	TBD	36	TBD		

== Macau ==
Host city	Event	Date	Teams	Athletes	Sports	Events	Officially opened by	Top placed team
Macau	2005 East Asian Games	October 29 - November 6	9	1,919	17	235	Vice Premier Wu Yi	China
Macau	2006 Lusophony Games	October 7 - 15	11	733	8	48	Chief Executive Edmund Ho	Brazil
Macau	2007 Asian Indoor Games	October 26 - November 3	44	1,792	17	151	Chief Executive Edmund Ho	China

== See also ==
List of multi-sport events
