= 2034 Asian Games =

Multi-sport event in Riyadh, Saudi Arabia

XXII Asian Games
- Riyadh application logo
- Host city: Riyadh, Saudi Arabia
- Motto: Transforming the Future (Arabic: تحويل المستقبل)
- Opening: 29 November 2034
- Closing: 14 December 2034
- Main venue: King Fahd International Stadium

Summer

Winter

The 2034 Asian Games (Arabic: دورة الألعاب الآسيوية 2034, romanized: Dawrat al-ʼAl‘ab al-Asīawīah 2034), officially known as the 22nd Asian Games (Arabic: الـ22 من الآسياد, romanized: Al 22 mn-Alīsyad) and commonly known as Riyadh 2034 (Arabic: الرياض 2034), will be the twenty-second edition of the Asian Games, a pan-Asian multi-sport event to be held from 29 November to 14 December 2034 in Riyadh, Saudi Arabia.

Riyadh was elected as the host city at the 39th Olympic Council of Asia (OCA) General Assembly on 16 December 2020 in Muscat, Oman. This will be the first Asian Games held in Saudi Arabia, as well as the third and the last of two consecutive Asian Games held in the Arabian Peninsula as the previous edition is set to be held in Doha, Qatar.

== Bidding process ==
An Olympic Council of Asia's (OCA) Evaluation Committee led by Andrey Krukov from Kazakhstan inspected the candidate cities of Doha and Riyadh. The OCA voted on 16 December 2020 at the 39th OCA General Assembly in Muscat, Oman to select the host city for the 2030 Asian Games. The OCA confirmed on 23 April 2020, that the Saudi Arabian Olympic Committee had submitted the bid documents and the letters of support from the Government of Saudi Arabia to host the Games in Riyadh. On 15 December 2020, OCA President Sheikh Ahmad Al-Fahad Al-Sabah announced that he would attempt to find a dual-host city solution to avoid a vote for the 2030 Asian Games, by persuading one city to host the event in 2030 and the other to organize the competition in 2034. On 16 December 2020, it was announced that Doha will host 2030 Games with the highest votes and Riyadh will host the 2034 Games. Saudi Arabia had asked the OCA to halt electronic voting on the host of the 2030 Asian Games due to "the possibility of technical fraud".

2030 Asian Games bidding results
City	NOC	Round 1	Result
Doha	Qatar	27	Doha awarded 2030 Asian Games
Riyadh	Saudi Arabia	10	Riyadh awarded 2034 Asian Games
Abstentions		8	

== Venues ==
=== Asian Games Park, Qiddiya ===
Venue	Events	Capacity	Status
Qiddiya Stadium	TBA	20,000	New
Qiddiya Arena	Basketball	18,000	New
E-Games Arena	Esports; Fencing	TBA	New
Tennis Center	Tennis	TBA	New
Aquatics Center	Artistic swimming Diving; Swimming	3,000	New
Baseball Ground	Baseball; Softball	TBA	New
Cricket Ground	Cricket	TBA	New
Cycling Park	Cycling (mountain bike)	TBA	New
BMX Park 1	Cycling (BMX freestyle)	TBA	New
BMX Park 2	Cycling (BMX race)	TBA	New
Motion Stadium	Athletics (marathon); Cycling (road)	TBA	New
White Water Stadium	Canoeing	TBA	New

=== King Saud University ===
Venue	Events	Capacity	Status
King Saud University Stadium	Football (preliminaries)	46,319	Existing
King Saud University Arena	Volleyball	7,500	Existing
Multipurpose Hall	Boxing	TBA	Existing
Dome A	Wushu	TBA	Existing, renovated
Dome B	Sepak takraw	3,000	Existing, renovated
Hockey Stadium	Field hockey	TBA	New
Rugby Stadium	Rugby sevens	TBA	Existing

=== Diriyah ===
Venue	Events	Capacity	Status
Urban Sports Park	3x3 Basketball; Breaking; Skateboarding; Sport climbing	TBA	TBA

=== SAOC Complex ===
Venue	Events	Capacity	Status
Green Hall 1	Handball	5,189	Existing
Green Hall 2	Water polo	1,814	Existing
Bowling Center	Bowling	TBA	Existing
Archery Range	Archery (preliminaries)	TBA	Renovated
Velodrome	Cycling (track)	TBA	New

=== Riyadh International Convention and Exhibition Center ===
Venue	Events	Capacity	Status
Hall 1	Gymnastics	TBA	Existing
Hall 2	Badminton	TBA	Existing
Hall 3	Table tennis Wrestling	TBA	Existing
Al Duhami Equestrian Center	Equestrian (dressage, jumping)	TBA	Existing
King Fahd Cultural Center	Weightlifting	TBA	Existing
Al Bujairi Arena	Athletics (marathon); Cycling (road)	TBA	Temporary

=== Riyadh standalone venues ===
Venue	Events	Capacity	Status
Prince Faisal bin Fahd Stadium	TBA	44,500	Existing
Malaz Hall 1	Jiu jitsu Kurash; Taekwondo	TBA	Existing
Malaz Hall 2	Judo; Karate	TBA	New
Masmak Fortress	Archery (finals)	TBA	Temporary
King Fahd International Stadium	Opening and closing ceremonies Football (finals)	70,200	Existing
Janadriyah Hippodrome	Camel racing Modern pentathlon	TBA	Existing
King Abdulaziz Equestrian Field	Equestrian (eventing)	TBA	Existing
Nofa Golf Resort	Golf	TBA	Existing
Shooting Center	Shooting	TBA	Existing

=== Khobar ===
Venue	Events	Capacity	Status
Regatta Course	Canoeing (sprint)	TBA	Existing
Sailing Marina	Sailing	TBA	Existing
Surfing Beach	Surfing	TBA	Existing
Yacht Harbor	Triathlon; Marathon swimming	TBA	Existing
Beach Volleyball Stadium	Beach volleyball	TBA	Existing
Prince Mohamed bin Fahd Stadium	Football (preliminaries)	26,000	Existing
Prince Saud bin Jalawi Stadium	Football (preliminaries)	11,500	Existing

Preceded by Doha	Asian Games; Riyadh; XXII Asian Games (2034)	Succeeded by TBD
