= Bids for the 2006 Asian Games =

Overview
- XV Asian Games
- Winner: Doha; Runner-up: Kuala Lumpur; Shortlist: Hong Kong · New Delhi

Details
- Committee: OCA
- Election venue: Busan, South Korea; 19th OCA General Assembly

Map
- Location of the bidding cities

Important dates
- Bid: 30 June 2000
- Decision: 12 November 2000

Decision
- Winner: Doha (22 votes)
- Runner-up: Kuala Lumpur (13 votes)

Four cities submitted bids to host the 2006 Asian Games that were recognised by the Olympic Council of Asia (OCA), all four of which made the OCA Executive Committee's shortlist. OCA selected a host city for the 2006 Asian Games in Busan, South Korea on 12 November 2000, which Doha won. The other shortlisted cities were Kuala Lumpur, Hong Kong, and New Delhi.

The voting process which involved the 41 members of OCA consisted of three rounds, each round eliminating one of the bidding cities. In the first round, New Delhi was eliminated with just two votes. In the second round, Doha won more than half of the available votes, thus cancelling the need for third round voting.

== Bidding process ==
- Submission of letters of intent (February 2000)
- Deadline for the submission of bids (30 June 2000)
- OCA Evaluation Committee visit to Doha (13–14 July 2000)
- OCA Evaluation Committee visit to New Delhi (15–16 July 2000)
- OCA Evaluation Committee visit to Kuala Lumpur (17–18 July 2000)
- OCA Evaluation Committee visit to Hong Kong (19–20 July 2000)
- Election of the host city at the 19th OCA General Assembly in Busan, South Korea (12 November 2000)

2006 Asian Games bidding results
City	NOC	Round 1	Round 2
Doha	Qatar	20	22
Kuala Lumpur	Malaysia	13	13
Hong Kong	Hong Kong	6	6
New Delhi	India	2	−

== Candidate cities ==
Logo	City	Country	National Olympic Committee	Result
	Doha	Qatar	Qatar Olympic Committee (QOC)	Winner
Doha, the capital city of Qatar, never hosted the Asian Games or bid before. Due to a lack of world-class sports facilities at the time of bidding, Qatar pledged to spend US$1 billion on facilities for the Games in all major towns of the country, of which US$700 million will be spent to build Games Village to accommodate the participating athletes and officials. Other facilities that will be built include nine new stadiums, 10 multi-purpose halls, a hockey court and a cycle race track. On the other hand, existing venues like the Khalifa International Stadium would only require renovation before being reused for multi-sport events.
	Kuala Lumpur	Malaysia	Olympic Council of Malaysia (OCM)	First runner-up
Kuala Lumpur, the capital city of Malaysia launched its bid on 3 August 1999 alongside its bid logo – a palm tree with 15 leaves symbolising the 15th Asian Games and mascot Cyber Alang – the robot rhinoceros hornbill. Most of the venues and infrastructures in the city and the other parts of the Klang Valley area were in place for the event, including the Bukit Jalil National Stadium, which had recently served as the main venue for the 1998 Commonwealth Games. The Games Village was proposed to be built at the University of Putra Malaysia main campus in Serdang, Selangor. Kuala Lumpur never hosted the Asian Games or bid before. Apart from the Commonwealth Games, it hosted four SEA Games in 1965, 1971, 1977 and 1989 and would be hosting its fifth the following year, which saw the Bukit Jalil Stadium being reused as the event's main venue.
	Hong Kong	Hong Kong	Sports Federation and Olympic Committee of Hong Kong, China (SF&OCHK)	Second runner-up
Main article: Hong Kong bid for the 2006 Asian Games Hong Kong, a city and special administrative region of China, never hosted the Asian Games or bid before. With the backing from the Government of Hong Kong since late 1999, the Asian Games Bid Committee was established on 3 March 2000 and chaired by then-Chief Secretary for Administration Anson Chan. On 12 May 2000, the Finance Committee of the Legislative Council accepted in principle the operating cost of HK$1,925 million and the operating deficit of HK$945 million for hosting the 2006 Asian Games and FESPIC Games, the latter was bidded by the Hong Kong Sports Association for the Physically Disabled. A total of thirty-one sports events were proposed by the SF&OCHK for the 2006 Asian Games, including mandatory ones on athletics and swimming. Apart from the Ma On Shan Sports Centre due for completion in 2003, all proposed venues in the city are existing facilities. The bid logo was a Chinese brush stroke rendition of a dragon, the symbol of Hong Kong's vigour and prosperity.
	New Delhi	India	Indian Olympic Association (IOA)	Third runner-up
New Delhi, the capital city of India, was the only candidate city to have hosted the Asian Games (twice in 1951 and 1982) and was seeking to host its third. The Union Cabinet of India approved holding the 2006 Asian Games in New Delhi if the Indian Olympic Association succeeds in its bid. Parliamentary Affairs Minister Pramod Mahajan told reporters after the Cabinet meeting on 20 June 2000, that the Government of India decided to issue a letter of guarantee supporting New Delhi's bid to hold the games, which guarantees free entry to athletes and delegates of all participating countries and the organisation of the event in accordance with the fundamental principles, objectives, rules and regulations of OCA.
