= Sport in Hong Kong =

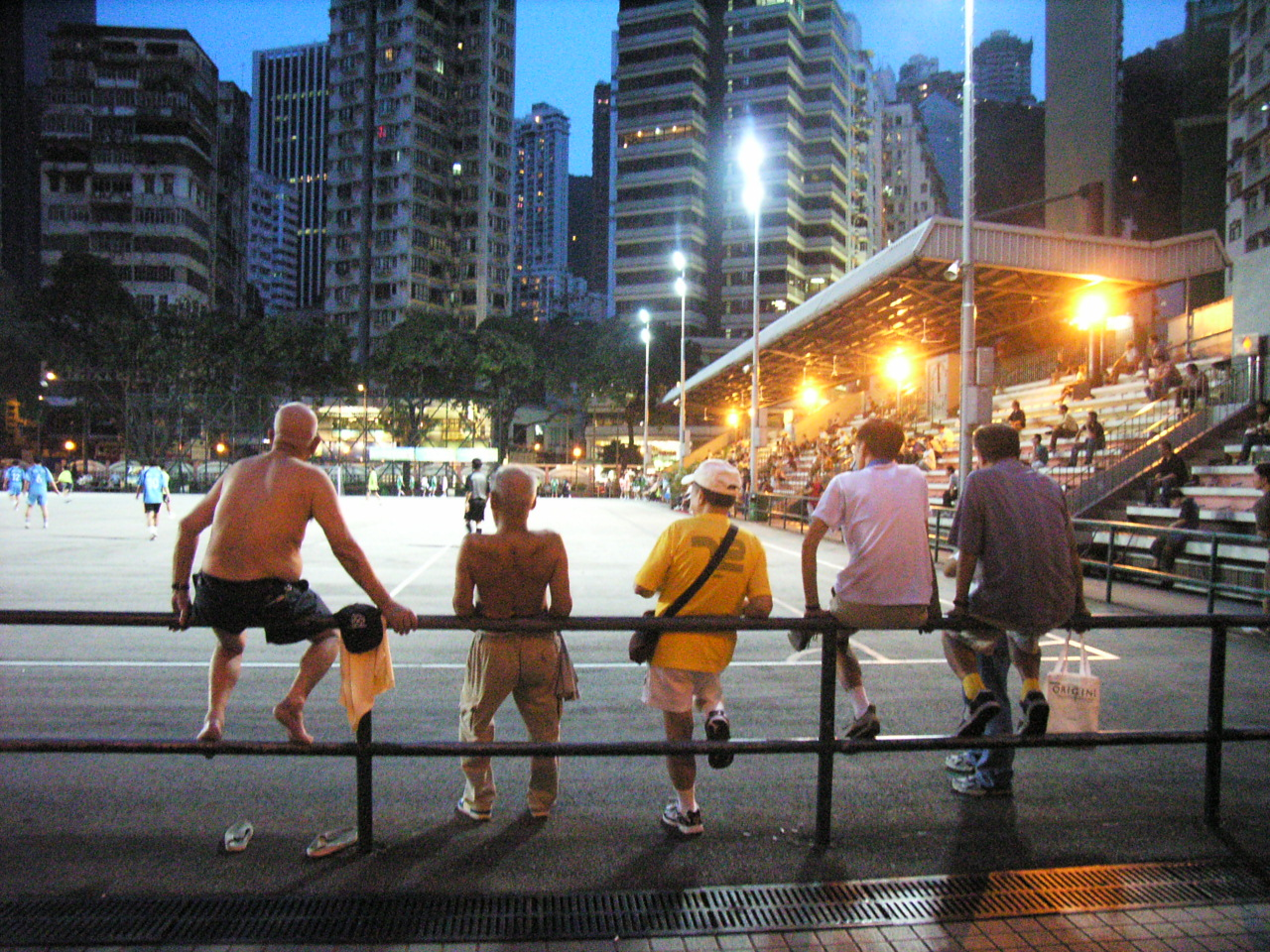
Night football game in Wan Chai

Sports in Hong Kong are a significant part of its culture. Due to British influence going as far back as the late 19th century, Hong Kong had an earlier introduction to Western athletics compared than other Asia regions.

In terms of participation, jogging, swimming, badminton, basketball, fitness, association football have the most participants. In terms of favourites, badminton (27.5%), swimming (24%), association football (18.4%), basketball (9.8%), and tennis (3.8%) are the most popular sports.

Golf is an increasingly popular sport, despite the relatively few number of courses in the city. In 2009, Hong Kong successfully organised the V East Asian Games and it was the biggest sporting event ever held in the territory. Other major international sporting events including the Equestrian at the 2008 Summer Olympics, the Hong Kong Open Golf Championship, the Hong Kong Sevens, Hong Kong Marathon, AFC Asian Cup, FIFA ASEAN Cup Division 2, Hong Kong Badminton Open, Hong Kong Tennis Classic, Premier League Asia Trophy, and Lunar New Year Cup. Hong Kong athletes have improved in worldwide rankings. As of 2010, there are 32 Hong Kong athletes from seven sports ranking in world's Top 20, 29 athletes in six sports in Asia top 10 ranking. Moreover, Hong Kong is equally impressive performance of athletes with disabilities in 2009, having won four world championships and two Asian Champions.

== History ==
Hong Kong City Hall is located today where the original location of "Victoria Recreation Club" stood in 1849 after having been in operation in Canton since 1832. It is the first sporting club established in Hong Kong's history. The first sports involved were water sports such as rowing.

The Hong Kong Open golf tournament is Hong Kong's oldest professional sporting event.

The primary sport in Hong Kong has been football due mainly to British influence going as far back as the late 19th century. The first documented team came from the "Chinese Football Team" of 1904, which was founded by Mok Hing. It was the first team to join The Hong Kong Football Association league in 1913/1914. At the time, the introduction of Hong Kong First Division League in 1908 was also another milestone. In the 1917 Far Eastern Games and 1919 Far Eastern Games, the club represented the Republic of China and won the football championship. It is the only team in Hong Kong sports history to have accomplished this feat. Around 1920–1922, it formally adopted the present name of South China Athletic Association and diversified into other sports.

Financial Secretary John James Cowperthwaite was one of the first government official to assist Hong Kong going into the 1956 Summer Olympics in Melbourne Australia with a contribution estimate of HK$10,000.

Victoria Park was one of the free range open space for pick-up games. Until the Hong Kong Stadium was built, there was no arena for spectator sports. By the 1960s a number of clubs have surfaced for mostly social reasons. Since then, Hong Kong sports has been described as "Club Life". Some clubs have documented their history thoroughly, while others have disappeared along with their past.

- Hong Kong Cricket Club
- Craigengower Cricket Club
- Kowloon Cricket Club
- Kowloon Bowling Green Club
- Indian Recreation Club
- Chinese Recreation Club
- Filipino Club
- South China Athletic Association
- United Services Recreation Club
- Hong Kong Football Club
- Club de Recreio
- Club Lusitano

Constructed in 2025 on the site of the old Kai Tak Airport, Kai Tak Sports Park is be the largest sports venue in Hong Kong and includes a 50,000 seat Main Stadium, an Indoor Sports Center, a Public Sports Ground and multiple open spaces.

== Transition ==
After World War II the Amateur Sports Federation & Olympic Committee of Hong Kong (ASF&OC) was established. The committee selected athletic leaders to represent Hong Kong in times of competition. Eventually the committee became known as the National Olympic Committee. After the transfer of sovereignty in 1997, Hong Kong has competed internationally under the name "Hong Kong, China" with the Bauhinia region flag. It is treated separately from People's Republic of China, which is counted as another entry in the games.

A variety of sports are available in Hong Kong, with most having their own association, and many clubs and groups, along with provision by bodies such as YWCA and YMCA. There are also local organisations that strive to help Hong Kong residents identify sports that are not broadly advertised enough. The Hong Kong Government is also known for its proactive approach towards sporting events prior to the Beijing Olympics.

== Spectator sports ==
=== Badminton ===
Badminton is one of the most popular sports in Hong Kong.

Some of the notable current professionals includes athletes such as Tse Ying Suet/Tang Chun Man in the mixed doubles category reaching the highest world ranking of 2, and Ng Ka Long Angus in the Men's single discipline with the highest ranking of 6.

=== Basketball ===
Basketball is one of the most popular sports in Hong Kong.

Hong Kong's national basketball team regularly qualifies for the FIBA Asia Cup. In club competitions, its team Regal won the 1997 ABC Champions Cup.

Hong Kong hosted the official 1983 Asian Basketball Championship.

=== Cricket ===
Cricket in Hong Kong has been played since at least 1841. Like most cricketing nations, it was part of the British Empire. The national cricket team has been active since 1866, and the Hong Kong Cricket Association was granted associate membership of the International Cricket Council (ICC) in 1969. Hong Kong hosted the Hong Kong Cricket Sixes, an ICC sanctioned event that features teams of six players in a six over competition annually till 2012. The Hong Kong Cricket Team qualified for 2014 ICC World Twenty20 and caused a major upset by defeating hosts Bangladesh.

=== Dragon boat racing ===
Dragon boat racing is one of the most popular sports in Hong Kong. The traditional Chinese sport of dragon boat racing was originally held as part of the Duan Wu festivities in Hong Kong. It is now spread internationally with races held all around the world. The Hong Kong Dragon Boat Association was a founding member of the international and regional governing bodies for dragon boat racing: The International Dragon Boat Federation and Asian Dragon Boat Federation. The oldest International Festival Races are those held in Hong Kong annually. The HKIR have been held since 1976 and are acknowledged as starting the modern era of the dragon boatsport.

=== Football ===
Football is one of the most popular sports in Hong Kong, with Hong Kong Premier League being the only fully professional sports league in the city. Lunar New Year Cup, which is held in Hong Kong Stadium, is a famous international football tournament hosted in Hong Kong.

Hong Kong was the first in Asia to organise a professional club.

Within the Asia context, Hong Kong was a comparative powerhouse from the 1920s to the 1970s.

=== Golf ===
Golf has been played in Hong Kong ever since the establishment of the Hong Kong Golf Club in 1879. The club, which has hosted the Hong Kong Open every year since 1959, has two sites - Fanling, which is home to three championship-calibre courses, and Deep Water Bay, a short nine hole course in southern Hong Kong Island. Hong Kong Golf Club is considered among the premier golf clubs in Asia and, despite being a private members' club, is open to visitors from Mondays through Fridays.

=== Horse racing ===
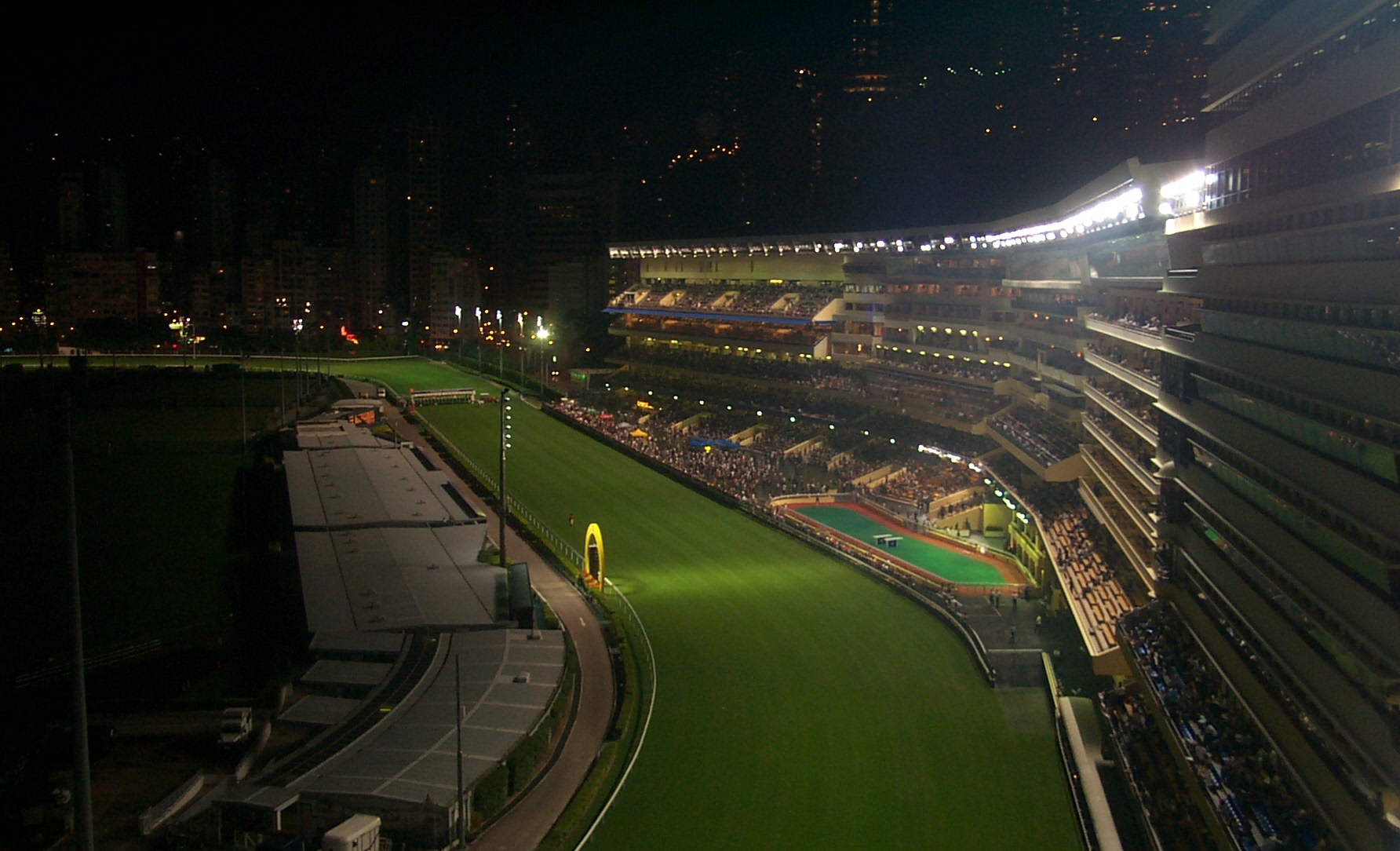
Happy Valley Racecourse at night

Horse racing is by far the most popular spectator sport in Hong Kong and generates the largest horse race gambling turnover in the world. This British tradition left its mark as one of the most important entertainment and gambling institutions in Hong Kong. Established as the Royal Hong Kong Jockey Club in 1884, the non-profit organization conducts nearly 700 races every season at the two race tracks in Happy Valley and Sha Tin. The sport annually draws in over 11% of Hong Kong's tax revenue. Off-track betting is available from overseas bookmakers. In 2009, betting on horse races generated an average US$12.7 million in gambling turnover per race, 6 times larger than its closest rival France at US$2 million while the United States only generated $250,000. Some consider betting on horse races an investment.

=== Lacrosse ===
Hong Kong men's national lacrosse team is one of Asia's top teams. It has qualified for the World Lacrosse Championship for the fifth consecutive time.

Hong Kong has sent national teams to the Under-19 World Lacrosse Championships.

In October 2021, Hong Kong's women's lacrosse team won bronze Dalmatia Cup in Split, Croatia. In its preparation for the World Lacrosse Women's World Championship, Hong Kong beat the Czech Republic 8–4 as team captain Daphne Li won the tournament MVP award. Head coach was Jenifer Marrosu.

=== Rugby union ===
Rugby is long established, partly as a result of its being a British colony. It is most notable for its sevens tournament.

The Hong Kong Rugby Football Union was founded in 1953.

== Organisations ==
=== Hong Kong Games ===
The Hong Kong Games is a territorial multi-sport event first held in 2007. The 18 districts of Hong Kong are the participating units.

=== Hong Kong Marathon ===
The Hong Kong Marathon takes place every February and draws as many as 30,000 participants.

== International sporting events ==
Hong Kong competes separately from China in various international sporting events. Hong Kong also had its own team during British administration prior to 1997.

Hong Kong athletes have long represented China in international sporting events, especially football, including during the period when Hong Kong was a British colony.

=== Asian Games ===
Hong Kong has been participating in the Asian Games since the 1954 Games. The most recent participation was the 2022 Asian Games. With the Government's support, the Sports Federation and Olympic Committee of Hong Kong, China submitted Hong Kong's bid for hosting the 2006 Asian Games to the Olympic Council of Asia (OCA) in 2000. Hong Kong lost the bid to Doha at the OCA general meeting held in Busan, South Korea on 12 November 2000.

=== East Asian Games ===
Hong Kong has participated in every East Asian Games since 1993, being a member of the East Asian Games Association (EAGA). The territory hosted the 2009 East Asian Games.

=== Commonwealth Games ===
Hong Kong competed at the Commonwealth Games from 1934 until 1994 as a British colony (as a Dependent territory from the 1986 Games). Over the years Team Hong Kong picked up a number of medals, including in Lawn Bowls.

=== Summer Olympics ===
As a British Colony, Hong Kong was accepted into the International Olympic Committee (IOC) in 1950.

Hong Kong has participated in all Summer Olympic Games since the 1952 Games in Helsinki, Finland. The first medal was won in the 1996 Games in Atlanta, USA. Lee Lai Shan won gold in the women's mistral individual event in sailing. Coincidentally, it was also the last medal won by Hong Kong as a British territory.

Two days after Hong Kong was returned to China in 1997, Hong Kong and the IOC signed an agreement stating, "It is the common aim to enable the people of Hong Kong to continue taking part in the Olympic Games and generally in sports competitions everywhere as a separate and independent entity." The Hong Kong Olympic Committee also added "China" to its name. Hong Kong's Olympic team flies the Hong Kong SAR flag and plays the PRC national anthem during official occasions like the flag-raising and victory ceremonies.

The territory participated under the new name and its new regional flag for the first time in the 2000 Games in Sydney. Hong Kong won its second ever Olympic medal in the 2004 Games in Athens, Greece, where Hong Kong won silver in men's doubles event in table tennis.

In London 2012, Wai-sze Lee's bronze is Hong Kong's first ever Olympic medal in cycling and its third overall.

In Tokyo 2020, Cheung Ka-long won an Olympic gold medal for Hong Kong, the first Olympic gold medal since the Handover of Hong Kong. In the same Olympics Siobhán Bernadette Haughey won two silver medals; the women's table tennis team, Grace Lau Mo-sheung, and Lee Wai-sze each won a bronze medal.

In Paris 2024, Vivian Kong became the third athlete to win a gold medal in the women's epee event, whilst Cheung Ka-long became the third fencer to retain his Olympic title by winning his second gold and Siobhán Bernadette Haughey took home two bronze medals.

The equestrian events of the 2008 Summer Olympics was held in Hong Kong. This marked the second time the same edition of the Olympic Games being hosted by two National Olympic Committees, namely by that of the People's Republic of China and Hong Kong. The Hong Kong Sports Institute at Fo Tan, Sha Tin was the site of the show jumping and dressage events. The cross-country phase of the three day event was held in Sheung Shui over both Beas River Equestrian Centre and Fanling Golf Course.

=== Winter Olympics ===
Hong Kong participated its first Winter Olympic Games in the 2002 Games in Salt Lake City, USA. Hong Kong has not won a medal at the Winter Games.

=== Paralympics ===
The first appearance of Hong Kong was in 1972 Summer Paralympics where ten male athletes took part. The team has never participated in the Winter Paralympics.

=== Hong Kong Sevens ===
The Hong Kong Sevens were established in 1976 and since held in March every year except for 1997 and 2005. It is considered the premier tournament on the IRB Sevens World Series. Organised by the Hong Kong Rugby Football Union, the tournament is held annually at the last weekend of March as a two-and-a-half-day event. It is participated by as many as 22 countries.

=== World Equestrian Games ===
Hong Kong participated in its first World Equestrian Games (WEG) in 2014 in Normandy France in Endurance, Show Jumping, and para-Dressage.

=== Hong Kong ePrix ===
The Hong Kong ePrix was an annual race of the single-seater, electrically powered Formula E championship, held at the Hong Kong Central Harbourfront Circuit in Hong Kong. It was first raced in the 2016–17 season and last held in 2019.

=== Gay Games ===
Hong Kong was announced as the host city of the 11th Gay Games, at a gala event at the Hotel de Ville in Paris, on 30 October 2017. They won with a clear majority of votes, in the first round of voting. It is the first time that the Gay Games will be held in Asia.

The "longlist" of cities interested in bidding to host Gay Games XI in 2022 was announced in April 2016. An unprecedented seventeen cities were interested in bidding. On 30 June 2016, the Federation of Gay Games announced that eleven cities had submitted their Letter of Intent to formally bid. Anaheim, Atlanta, Des Moines, Madison, Minneapolis and San Antonio decided not to pursue their option to bid. On 31 July 2016, 9 cities submitted their second registration fee to remain in the bid process. Both Cape Town and Tel Aviv dropped out at this stage, stating an intention to bid for Gay Games XII in 2026. On 30 November 2016, Bid Books were submitted by eight candidate cities with Los Angeles dropping out at this stage.

== See also ==
- Hong Kong Sports Institute
- Hong Kong Cycling Association
- Hong Kong Open Badminton
